= 1992 Dallas Cowboys season =

NFL team season

- Owner: Jerry Jones
- General manager: Jerry Jones and Jimmy Johnson
- Head coach: Jimmy Johnson
- Offensive coordinator: Norv Turner
- Defensive coordinator: Dave Wannstedt
- Home stadium: Texas Stadium

Results
- Record: 13–3
- Division place: 1st NFC East
- Playoffs: Won Divisional Playoffs (vs. Eagles) 34–10; Won NFC Championship (at 49ers) 30–20; Won Super Bowl XXVII (vs. Bills) 52–17
- Pro Bowlers: QB Troy Aikman; RB Emmitt Smith; WR Michael Irvin; TE Jay Novacek; OL Nate Newton; C Mark Stepnoski

The 1992 Dallas Cowboys season was the franchise's 33rd season in the National Football League (NFL) and was the fourth year of the franchise under head coach Jimmy Johnson. The Cowboys made the first of three Super Bowl appearances between 1992 and 1995.

Headed by a powerful offense and the NFL's number one ranked defense, Dallas fielded at the time, the youngest team in the NFL and posted a franchise-best 13–3 record throughout the regular season. In the playoffs, the Cowboys disposed of the Philadelphia Eagles 34–10 in the Divisional Playoffs, then had a memorable 30–20 victory against the San Francisco 49ers in the NFC Championship Game. At Super Bowl XXVII in Pasadena, the Cowboys routed the Buffalo Bills 52–17, winning their third Super Bowl title.

This team ranked #6 on the 100 greatest teams of all time presented by the NFL on its 100th anniversary.

== Offseason ==
Additions	Subtractions
C Frank Cornish (Chargers)	TE Rob Awalt (Broncos)
S Thomas Everett (Steelers)	LB Jack Del Rio (Vikings)
DE Charles Haley (49ers)	K Ken Willis (Buccaneers)
	CB Manny Hendrix (49ers)
	S Stan Smagala (Steelers)

=== NFL draft ===
1992 Dallas Cowboys draft
Round	Pick	Player	Position	College	Notes
1	17	Kevin Smith *	CB	Texas A&M	
1	24	Robert Jones *	LB	East Carolina	
2	36	Jimmy Smith *	WR	Jackson State	
2	37	Darren Woodson *	S	Arizona State	
3	58	Clayton Holmes	CB	Carson–Newman	
3	82	James Brown	OT	Virginia State	
4	109	Tom Myslinski	G	Tennessee	
5	120	Greg Briggs	S	Texas Southern	
5	121	Rod Milstead	G	Delaware State	
6	149	Fallon Wacasey	TE	Tulsa	
9	248	Nate Kirtman	S	Pomona-Pitzer	
Made roster † Pro Football Hall of Fame * Made at least one Pro Bowl during career

=== Undrafted free agents ===
1992 undrafted free agents of note
Player	Position	College
Michael Beasley	Running back	West Virginia
Swift Burch	Defensive lineman	Temple
Lin Elliott	Kicker	Texas Tech
Melvin Evans	Guard	Texas Southern
Patt Evans	Tight end	Minnesota
Melvin Foster	Linebacker	Iowa
Howard Heath	Tight end	Jackson State
Michael James	Defensive back	Arkansas

== Season summary ==
The season started off with two crucial wins against the Washington Redskins and the New York Giants, both victors of the previous two Super Bowls. A ferocious Dallas defense, with not a single player nominated to the Pro Bowl, placed first in the NFL in total defense. Running back Emmitt Smith also collected his second straight NFL rushing title.

The 1992 season also saw a renewed rivalry between the Cowboys and the San Francisco 49ers in the NFC Championship game, more than a decade after the famous play known as The Catch in the 1981 NFC Championship game. That game had marked the start of the rise of the 49ers and the fall of the Cowboys throughout the 1980s. The rise of the 1990s Cowboys was christened with a 30–20 victory in this year's NFC Championship game against San Francisco at Candlestick Park. Both franchises would meet again in the next two NFC Championship games in what many consider to be a classic series of contests between future Hall of Fame players.

At the Rose Bowl, site of Super Bowl XXVII, the Cowboys struggled early, finding themselves down 0–7, but then regrouped when Aikman's pass to tight end Jay Novacek tied the game 7–7. From there, Dallas gained all the momentum and routed the Buffalo Bills 52–17, forcing a record 9 turnovers and knocking Bills quarterback Jim Kelly out of the game. Troy Aikman earned Super Bowl MVP honors after completing 22 of 30 passes for 273 yards and 4 touchdowns to wrap up a phenomenal postseason performance.

Notable additions to the team this year included defensive end Charles Haley, cornerback Kevin Smith, linebacker Robert Jones, safety Thomas Everett, safety Darren Woodson and wide receiver Jimmy Smith (though Smith would never catch a pass during his time with the team).

The Dallas defense (nicknamed "Doomsday II") achieved the following:

- It was only the third defense since 1980 to hold opponents to fewer than 4,000 yards in a 16-game season. The other defenses to have done it are recognized as two of the greatest of modern era: the 1984 Chicago Bears and the 1991 Philadelphia Eagles.
- It was the second defense to rank No. 1 in fewest yards yielded without sending a player to the Pro Bowl. The 1983 Cincinnati Bengals, who had a losing record, were the first.
- The defense finished first in the NFL in total defense (245.8 yards-per-game), while the secondary finished the year fifth in passing defense (168.1 yards-per-game).
- It led the NFL in defense against the rush and fewest first downs allowed. Its league lead in preventing third-down conversions was staggering. Dallas's opponents converted 27.2 percent. The Seattle Seahawks ranked second at 32.6 percent.
- It set a club record by holding the Seattle Seahawks to 62 yards in a 27–0 victory and closed the season by holding the Chicago Bears to fewer than 100 yards.
- During Super Bowl XXVII it produced a Super Bowl-record 9 turnovers (5 fumbles and 4 interceptions) while also scoring two touchdowns.

== Staff ==
1992 Dallas Cowboys staff
Front office: Owner/president/general manager – Jerry Jones; Executive vice president – Mike McCoy; Public relations director – Rich Dalrymple; Director of College Scouting – Larry Lacewell; Scouts – Jim Garrett, Walter Juliff, Jeff Smith, and Walt Yowarsky; Head coaches: Head coach – Jimmy Johnson; Offensive coaches: Offensive coordinator – Norv Turner; Running backs – Joe Brodsky; Wide receivers – Hubbard Alexander; Tight ends - Robert Ford; Offensive line – Tony Wise	Defensive coaches: Defensive coordinator – Dave Wannstedt; Defensive line – Butch Davis; Defensive backs – Dave Campo; Special teams coaches: Special teams – Joe Avezzano; Kicking/offensive and defensive quality control - Steve Hoffman; Strength and conditioning: Strength and conditioning – Mike Woicik

== Roster ==
Dallas Cowboys 1992 roster
Quarterbacks: 8 Troy Aikman; 7 Steve Beuerlein; Running backs: 34 Tommie Agee FB; 48 Daryl Johnston FB; 27 Curvin Richards; 22 Emmitt Smith; Wide receivers: 80 Alvin Harper; 88 Michael Irvin; 83 Kelvin Martin KR/PR; 82 Jimmy Smith; Tight ends: 84 Jay Novacek; 87 Alfredo Roberts; 89 Derek Tennell	Offensive linemen: 68 Frank Cornish C; 63 John Gesek G; 66 Kevin Gogan G; 61 Nate Newton G; 53 Mark Stepnoski C; 71 Mark Tuinei T; 76 Alan Veingrad T; 79 Erik Williams T; Defensive linemen: 75 Tony Casillas DT; 94 Charles Haley DE; 95 Chad Hennings DE; 77 Jim Jeffcoat DE; 97 Jimmie Jones DT; 78 Leon Lett DT; 67 Russell Maryland DT; 92 Tony Tolbert DE	Linebackers: 58 Dixon Edwards MLB; 55 Robert Jones MLB; 98 Godfrey Myles OLB; 51 Ken Norton Jr. OLB; 52 Mickey Pruitt OLB; 57 Vinson Smith OLB; Defensive backs: 24 Larry Brown CB; 31 Thomas Everett SS; 29 Kenneth Gant SS; 47 Clayton Holmes CB; 30 Issiac Holt CB; 20 Ray Horton FS; 26 Kevin Smith CB; 37 James Washington FS; 23 Robert Williams CB; 28 Darren Woodson SS; Special teams: 2 Lin Elliott K; 70 Dale Hellestrae LS; 4 Mike Saxon P	Reserve lists: 40 Bill Bates S (IR); 42 Greg Briggs S (PUP); 3 Tim Daniel WR (PUP); 60 Melvin Evans G (IR); 56 Melvin Foster LB (PUP); 39 Derrick Gainer RB (IR); 90 Tony Hill DE (IR); 69 Todd Jones T (PUP); Practice squad: -- Michael Beasley RB; 17 Jason Garrett QB; 89 Fallon Wacasey TE (IR); 86 Tyrone Williams WR; Rookies in italics 47 active, 9 inactive, 3 practice squad

== Preseason ==
Week	Date	Opponent	Result	Record	Venue	Recap
1	August 2	vs. Houston Oilers	L 23–34	0–1	Tokyo Dome (Tokyo)	Recap
2	August 7	at Miami Dolphins	W 27–24	1–1	Joe Robbie Stadium	Recap
3	August 15	Houston Oilers	L 16–17	1–2	Texas Stadium	Recap
4	August 22	Denver Broncos	W 17–3	2–2	Texas Stadium	Recap
5	August 28	Chicago Bears	L 13–20	2–3	Texas Stadium	Recap

== Regular season ==
Week	Date	Opponent	Result	Record	Venue	Recap
1	September 7	Washington Redskins	W 23–10	1–0	Texas Stadium	Recap
2	September 13	at New York Giants	W 34–28	2–0	Giants Stadium	Recap
3	September 20	Phoenix Cardinals	W 31–20	3–0	Texas Stadium	Recap
4	Bye					
5	October 5	at Philadelphia Eagles	L 7–31	3–1	Veterans Stadium	Recap
6	October 11	Seattle Seahawks	W 27–0	4–1	Texas Stadium	Recap
7	October 18	Kansas City Chiefs	W 17–10	5–1	Texas Stadium	Recap
8	October 25	at Los Angeles Raiders	W 28–13	6–1	Los Angeles Memorial Coliseum	Recap
9	November 1	Philadelphia Eagles	W 20–10	7–1	Texas Stadium	Recap
10	November 8	at Detroit Lions	W 37–3	8–1	Pontiac Silverdome	Recap
11	November 15	Los Angeles Rams	L 23–27	8–2	Texas Stadium	Recap
12	November 22	at Phoenix Cardinals	W 16–10	9–2	Sun Devil Stadium	Recap
13	November 26	New York Giants	W 30–3	10–2	Texas Stadium	Recap
14	December 6	at Denver Broncos	W 31–27	11–2	Mile High Stadium	Recap
15	December 13	at Washington Redskins	L 17–20	11–3	RFK Stadium	Recap
16	December 21	at Atlanta Falcons	W 41–17	12–3	Georgia Dome	Recap
17	December 27	Chicago Bears	W 27–14	13–3	Texas Stadium	Recap

=== Standings ===
NFC East
	W	L	T	PCT	DIV	CONF	PF	PA	STK
^{(2)} Dallas Cowboys	13	3	0	.813	6–2	9–3	409	243	W2
^{(5)} Philadelphia Eagles	11	5	0	.688	6–2	8–4	354	245	W4
^{(6)} Washington Redskins	9	7	0	.563	4–4	7–5	300	255	L2
New York Giants	6	10	0	.375	2–6	4–8	306	367	L1
Phoenix Cardinals	4	12	0	.250	2–6	4–10	243	332	L2

=== Game summaries ===
==== Week 1: vs Washington Redskins ====
Week 1: Washington Redskins at Dallas Cowboys

Quarter	1	2	3	4	Total
Redskins	0	7	0	3	10
Cowboys	9	7	7	0	23

at Texas Stadium, Irving, Texas

- Date: September 7
- Game time: 9:00 p.m. EST
- Game weather: 83 °F (28 °C) (Clear/Humid)
- Referee: Dick Hantak
- TV announcers (ABC): Al Michaels, Frank Gifford, and Dan Dierdorf

==== Week 2: at New York Giants ====
Week 2: Dallas Cowboys at New York Giants

Quarter	1	2	3	4	Total
Cowboys	17	10	7	0	34
Giants	0	0	14	14	28

at Giants Stadium, East Rutherford, New Jersey

- Date: September 13
- Game time: 1:00 p.m. EST
- Game weather: 64 °F (18 °C) (Clear)
- Referee: Tom White
- TV announcers (CBS): Verne Lundquist and John Madden

The Cowboys won despite giving up the game's final 28 points.

==== Week 3: vs Phoenix Cardinals ====
Week 3: Arizona Cardinals at Dallas Cowboys

Quarter	1	2	3	4	Total
Cardinals	7	3	3	7	20
Cowboys	14	7	7	3	31

at Texas Stadium, Irving, Texas

- Date: September 20
- Game time: 4:00 p.m. EST
- Game weather: 84 °F (29 °C) (Clear/Humid)
- Referee: Red Cashion
- TV announcers (CBS): Dick Stockton and Randy Cross

==== Week 5: at Philadelphia Eagles ====
Week 5: Dallas Cowboys at Philadelphia Eagles

Quarter	1	2	3	4	Total
Cowboys	7	0	0	0	7
Eagles	10	0	7	14	31

at Veterans Stadium, Philadelphia, Pennsylvania

- Date: October 5
- Game time: 9:00 p.m. EST
- Game weather: 55 °F (13 °C) (Clear)
- Referee: Jerry Markbreit
- TV announcers (ABC): Al Michaels, Frank Gifford, and Dan Dierdorf

The Cowboys were defeated in their first meeting with Eagles running back Herschel Walker since they traded him from Dallas to the Vikings during the 1989 season. Walker scored twice while putting up 100 all-purpose yards against the Cowboys. Troy Aikman was intercepted three times.

==== Week 6: vs Seattle Seahawks ====
Week 6: Seattle Seahawks at Dallas Cowboys

Quarter	1	2	3	4	Total
Seahawks	0	0	0	0	0
Cowboys	7	13	7	0	27

at Texas Stadium, Irving, Texas

- Date: October 11
- Game time: 1:00 p.m. EST
- Game weather: 66 °F (19 °C) (Clear)
- Referee: Bernie Kukar
- TV announcers (NBC): Marv Albert and Bill Parcells

==== Week 7: vs Kansas City Chiefs ====
Week 7: Kansas City Chiefs at Dallas Cowboys

Quarter	1	2	3	4	Total
Chiefs	3	7	0	0	10
Cowboys	7	7	3	0	17

at Texas Stadium, Irving, Texas

- Date: October 18
- Game time: 1:00 p.m. EST
- Game weather: 60 °F (16 °C) (Clear)
- Referee: Johnny Grier
- TV announcers (NBC): Dick Enberg and Bob Trumpy

==== Week 8: at Los Angeles Raiders ====
Week 8: Dallas Cowboys at Los Angeles Raiders

Quarter	1	2	3	4	Total
Cowboys	7	0	7	14	28
Raiders	6	0	7	0	13

at Los Angeles Memorial Coliseum, Los Angeles, California

- Date: October 25
- Game time: 4:00 p.m. EST
- Game weather: 79 °F (26 °C) (Clear)
- Referee: Gerald Austin
- TV announcers (CBS): James Brown and John Robinson

Emmitt Smith led the way with 152 rushing yards and 3 touchdowns, with Troy Aikman running for a TD to go along with his 234 yards passing. The Cowboys' defense held Los Angeles to just 188 total offensive yards – 71 rushing and 117 passing.

==== Week 9: vs Philadelphia Eagles ====
Week 9: Philadelphia Eagles at Dallas Cowboys

Quarter	1	2	3	4	Total
Eagles	0	0	10	0	10
Cowboys	0	3	7	10	20

at Texas Stadium, Irving, Texas

- Date: November 1
- Game time: 4:00 p.m. EST
- Game weather: 69 °F (21 °C) (Partly cloudy)
- Referee: Bob McElwee
- TV announcers (CBS): Pat Summerall and John Madden

==== Week 10: at Detroit Lions ====
Week 10: Dallas Cowboys at Detroit Lions

Quarter	1	2	3	4	Total
Cowboys	14	6	14	3	37
Lions	0	3	0	0	3

at Pontiac Silverdome, Pontiac, Michigan

- Date: November 8
- Game time: 1:00 p.m. EST
- Game weather: Dome controlled
- Referee: Ed Hochuli
- TV announcers (CBS): Pat Summerall and John Madden

The Cowboys held the Lions to 201 total yards, 108 of them from Barry Sanders. Rodney Peete and Erik Kramer were intercepted a total of three times.

==== Week 11: vs Los Angeles Rams ====
Week 11: Los Angeles Rams at Dallas Cowboys

Quarter	1	2	3	4	Total
Rams	7	14	0	6	27
Cowboys	3	10	10	0	23

at Texas Stadium, Irving, Texas

- Date: November 15
- Game time: 4:00 p.m. EST
- Game weather: 70 °F (21 °C) (Clear)
- Referee: Red Cashion
- TV announcers (CBS): Verne Lundquist and Dan Fouts

==== Week 12: at Phoenix Cardinals ====
Week 12: Dallas Cowboys at Phoenix Cardinals

Quarter	1	2	3	4	Total
Cowboys	0	10	6	0	16
Cardinals	7	0	0	3	10

at Sun Devil Stadium, Tempe, Arizona

- Date: November 22
- Game time: 4:00 p.m. EST
- Game weather: 65 °F (18 °C) (Clear)
- Referee: Jerry Markbreit
- TV announcers (CBS): James Brown and George Starke

==== Week 13: vs New York Giants ====
Week 13: New York Giants at Dallas Cowboys

Quarter	1	2	3	4	Total
Giants	0	3	0	0	3
Cowboys	3	6	14	7	30

at Texas Stadium, Irving, Texas

- Date: November 26 (Thanksgiving Day)
- Game time: 4:00 p.m. EST
- Game weather: 43 °F (6 °C) (Cloudy)
- Referee: Johnny Grier
- TV announcers (CBS): Pat Summerall and John Madden

==== Week 14: at Denver Broncos ====
Week 14: Dallas Cowboys at Denver Broncos

Quarter	1	2	3	4	Total
Cowboys	14	3	7	7	31
Broncos	7	6	7	7	27

at Mile High Stadium, Denver, Colorado

- Date: December 6
- Game time: 4:00 p.m. EST
- Game weather: 45 °F (7 °C) (Clear)
- Referee: Gerald Austin
- TV announcers (CBS): Pat Summerall and John Madden

The Cowboys had their hands full as Tommy Maddox threw three touchdowns but was intercepted four times. The Broncos took a fourth-quarter lead on an 81-yard touchdown to Cedric Tillman. Emmitt Smith was held to just 62 yards but ran in the winning score.

==== Week 15: at Washington Redskins ====
Week 15: Dallas Cowboys at Washington Redskins

Quarter	1	2	3	4	Total
Cowboys	3	14	0	0	17
Redskins	0	7	3	10	20

at RFK Stadium, Washington, D.C.

- Date: December 13
- Game time: 4:00 p.m. EST
- Game weather: 43 °F (6 °C) (Cloudy)
- Referee: Bob McElwee
- TV announcers (CBS): Pat Summerall and John Madden

Emmitt Smith recovered a fumble in his own endzone in the fourth quarter; he threw the ball and was intercepted by Danny Copeland for the winning Redskins touchdown. A livid Jimmy Johnson railed at his players on the air flight home.

==== Week 16: at Atlanta Falcons ====
Week 16: Dallas Cowboys at Atlanta Falcons

Quarter	1	2	3	4	Total
Cowboys	3	17	14	7	41
Falcons	7	3	0	7	17

at Georgia Dome, Atlanta, Georgia

- Date: December 21
- Game time: 8:00 p.m. EST
- Game weather: Dome controlled
- Referee: Larry Nemmers
- TV announcers (ABC): Al Michaels, Frank Gifford, and Dan Dierdorf

==== Week 17: vs Chicago Bears ====
Week 17: Chicago Bears at Dallas Cowboys

Quarter	1	2	3	4	Total
Bears	0	0	0	14	14
Cowboys	0	3	24	0	27

at Texas Stadium, Irving, Texas

- Date: December 27
- Game time: 4:00 p.m. EST
- Game weather: 61 °F (16 °C) (Partly cloudy)
- Referee: Gordon McCarter
- TV announcers (CBS): Pat Summerall and John Madden

Curvin Richards rushed for his only career touchdown, but fumbled twice and was cut from the Cowboys the next day.

== Post-Season ==
=== Schedule ===
Round	Date	Opponent (seed)	Result	Record	Venue	Game Recap
Wild Card	First-round bye					
Divisional	January 10, 1993	Philadelphia Eagles (5)	W 34–10	1–0	Texas Stadium	Recap
NFC Championship	January 17, 1993	at San Francisco 49ers (1)	W 30–20	2–0	Candlestick Park	Recap
Super Bowl XXVII	January 31, 1993	Buffalo Bills (A4)	W 52–17	3–0	Rose Bowl	Recap

=== NFC Divisional Round: Dallas Cowboys 34, Philadelphia Eagles 10 ===
Quarter	1	2	3	4	Total
Eagles	3	0	0	7	10
Cowboys	7	10	10	7	34

at Texas Stadium, Irving, Texas

- Game time: 12:30 p.m. EST/11:30 a.m. CST
- Game weather: 57 °F (14 °C), partly cloudy
- Game attendance: 63,721
- Referee: Tom White
- TV announcers (CBS): Verne Lundquist and Dan Fouts

Game information
- Scoring
  - PHI – field goal Ruzek 32 PHI 3–0
  - DAL – Tennell 1 pass from Aikman (Elliott kick) DAL 7–3
  - DAL – Novacek 6 pass from Aikman (Elliott kick) DAL 14–3
  - DAL – field goal Elliott 20 DAL 17–3
  - DAL – Smith 23 run (Elliott kick) DAL 24–3
  - DAL – field goal Elliott 43 DAL 27–3
  - DAL – Gainer 1 run (Elliott kick) DAL 34–3
  - PHI – Williams 18 pass from Cunningham (Ruzek kick) DAL 34–10

The Cowboys held the Eagles to 178 total net yards; Randall Cunningham managed a late touchdown but managed only 182 combined yards and was sacked five times for 45 lost yards; Herschel Walker managed only 29 rushing yards and caught six passes for 37 yards. Troy Aikman had two touchdowns and 200 passing yards (88 of them to Michael Irvin) while Emmitt Smith rushed for 114 yards and a score.

=== NFC Conference Championship: Dallas Cowboys 30, San Francisco 49ers 20 ===
Quarter	1	2	3	4	Total
Cowboys	3	7	7	13	30
49ers	7	3	3	7	20

at Candlestick Park, San Francisco

- Game time: 4:00 p.m. EST/1:00 p.m. PST
- Game weather: 54 °F (12 °C), partly cloudy, occasional rain
- Game attendance: 64,920
- Referee: Jerry Markbreit
- TV announcers (CBS): Pat Summerall and John Madden

The two teams combined for 831 yards in the Cowboys' first overall win over the 49ers since 1980. A failed Cowboys fourth-down conversion attempt while up 24–13 set up Steve Young's touchdown to Jerry Rice late in the fourth quarter, but San Francisco's comeback attempt ended when a 70-yard Alvin Harper catch set up Kelvin Martin's touchdown catch and a subsequent interception of Young, the Niners' fourth turnover of the game. On Harper's late catch the play was initially intended for Michael Irvin but he and Harper switched routes in the huddle. This was the last road playoff win for the Cowboys until 2022.

== Super Bowl ==
Quarter	1	2	3	4	Total
Bills (AFC)	7	3	7	0	17
Cowboys (NFC)	14	14	3	21	52

at Rose Bowl, Pasadena, California

- Date: January 31, 1993
- Game attendance: 98,374
- Referee: Dick Hantak
- TV announcers (NBC): Dick Enberg and Bob Trumpy

== Awards and records ==
- Troy Aikman, Super Bowl Most Valuable Player
- Robert Jones, Linebacker, UPI NFL-NFC Rookie of the Year

== Publications ==
- The Football Encyclopedia ISBN 0-312-11435-4
- Total Football ISBN 0-06-270170-3
- Cowboys Have Always Been My Heroes ISBN 0-446-51950-2
