= 1988 Miami Hurricanes football team =

American college football season

1988 Miami Hurricanes football

Orange Bowl champion

Orange Bowl, W 23–3 vs. Nebraska
- Conference: Independent

Ranking
- Coaches: No. 2
- AP: No. 2
- Record: 11–1
- Head coach: Jimmy Johnson (5th season)
- Offensive coordinator: Gary Stevens (6th season)
- Offensive scheme: Pro-style
- Defensive coordinator: Dave Wannstedt (3rd season)
- Base defense: 4–3
- MVP: Steve Walsh
- Home stadium: Miami Orange Bowl

1988 NCAA Division I-A independents football records
	Conf.					Overall
Team	W		L		T	W		L		T
No. 1 Notre Dame		–		–		12	–	0	–	0
No. 2 Miami (FL)		–		–		11	–	1	–	0
No. 3 Florida State		–		–		11	–	1	–	0
No. 5 West Virginia		–		–		11	–	1	–	0
Southern Miss		–		–		10	–	2	–	0
No. 13 Syracuse		–		–		10	–	2	–	0
Army		–		–		9	–	3	–	0
Louisville		–		–		8	–	3	–	0
South Carolina		–		–		8	–	4	–	0
Northern Illinois		–		–		7	–	4	–	0
Pittsburgh		–		–		6	–	5	–	0
Memphis State		–		–		6	–	5	–	0
Southwestern Louisiana		–		–		6	–	5	–	0
Rutgers		–		–		5	–	6	–	0
Akron		–		–		5	–	6	–	0
Penn State		–		–		5	–	6	–	0
Tulane		–		–		5	–	6	–	0
Temple		–		–		4	–	7	–	0
Tulsa		–		–		4	–	7	–	0
Boston College		–		–		3	–	8	–	0
Cincinnati		–		–		3	–	8	–	0
East Carolina		–		–		3	–	8	–	0
Navy		–		–		3	–	8	–	0
Virginia Tech		–		–		3	–	8	–	0
Rankings from AP Poll

The 1988 Miami Hurricanes football team represented the University of Miami as an independent during the 1988 NCAA Division I-A football season. It was the Hurricanes' 63rd season of football. The Hurricanes were led by fifth-year head coach Jimmy Johnson and played home games at the Miami Orange Bowl. They finished the season 11–1 overall. They were invited to the Orange Bowl, where they defeated Nebraska, 23–3.

== Schedule ==
Date	Opponent	Rank	Site	TV	Result	Attendance	Source
September 3	No. 1 Florida State	No. 6	Miami Orange Bowl; Miami, FL (rivalry)	CBS	W 31–0	77,836	
September 17	at No. 15 Michigan	No. 1	Michigan Stadium; Ann Arbor, MI	ABC	W 31–30	105,834	
September 24	Wisconsin	No. 1	Miami Orange Bowl; Miami, FL		W 23–3	48,311	
October 1	Missouri	No. 1	Miami Orange Bowl; Miami, FL		W 55–0	40,654	
October 15	at No. 4 Notre Dame	No. 1	Notre Dame Stadium; Notre Dame, IN (Catholics vs. Convicts, rivalry)	CBS	L 30–31	59,075	
October 22	Cincinnati	No. 4	Miami Orange Bowl; Miami, FL		W 57–3	44,107	
October 29	at East Carolina	No. 4	Ficklen Memorial Stadium; Greenville, NC		W 31–7	29,400	
November 5	Tulsa^{†}	No. 3	Miami Orange Bowl; Miami, FL		W 34–3	38,196	
November 19	at No. 11 LSU	No. 3	Tiger Stadium; Baton Rouge, LA	ESPN	W 44–3	79,528	
November 26	No. 8 Arkansas	No. 3	Miami Orange Bowl; Miami, FL	CBS	W 18–16	63,271	
December 3	BYU	No. 2	Miami Orange Bowl; Miami, FL	ESPN	W 41–17	59,367	
January 2	vs. No. 6 Nebraska	No. 2	Miami Orange Bowl; Miami, FL (Orange Bowl, rivalry)	NBC	W 23–3	79,480	
^{†}Homecoming; Rankings from AP Poll released prior to the game

== Rankings ==
Ranking movements Legend: ██ Increase in ranking ██ Decrease in ranking ( ) = First-place votes
	Week																
Poll	Pre	1	2	3	4	5	6	7	8	9	10	11	12	13	14	15	Final
AP	8 (1)	6 (1)	1 (38)	1 (46)	1 (46)	1 (55)	1 (53)	1 (52)	4	4	3 (1)	3 (1)	3 (1)	3 (1)	2 (1)	2 (1)	2 (1 1/2)
Coaches	5 (4)	5 (4)	1 (29)	1 (37)	1 (45)	1 (45)	1 (43)	1 (44)	4	4	3	3	3 (1)	3 (1)	2 (2)	2 (3)	2 (2)

== Game summaries ==
=== Florida State ===
#1 Florida State at #6 Miami (FL)

Team	1	2	3	4	Total
Seminoles	0	0	0	0	0
• Hurricanes	3	14	7	7	31

- Date: September 3
- Location: Miami Orange Bowl, Miami, Florida
- Game attendance: 77,836
- TV announcers (CBS Sports): Brent Musburger, Pat Haden, and John Dockery

Scoring summary
1	11:46	MIA	Carlos Huerta 46-yard field goal	MIA 3-0
2	14:27	MIA	Cleveland Gary 2-yard run (Carlos Huerta kick)	MIA 10-0
2	0:11	MIA	Rob Chudzinski 19-yard pass from Steve Walsh (Carlos Huerta kick)	MIA 17-0
3	8:54	MIA	Leonard Conley 5-yard pass from Steve Walsh (Carlos Huerta kick)	MIA 24-0
4	1:30	MIA	Pee Wee Smith 17-yard pass from Craig Erickson (Carlos Huerta kick)	MIA 31-0

=== At Michigan ===
#1 Miami (FL) at #15 Michigan

Team	1	2	3	4	Total
• Hurricanes	7	7	0	17	31
Wolverines	3	17	3	7	30

- Date: September 17
- Location: Michigan Stadium, Ann Arbor, Michigan
- Game attendance: 105,834
- TV announcers (ABC Sports): Keith Jackson, Bob Griese

Scoring summary
1		Michigan	Mike Gillette 22-yard field goal	Michigan 3-0
1		Miami (FL)	Cleveland Gary 49-yard pass from Steve Walsh (Carlos Huerta kick)	Miami (FL) 7-3
2		Michigan	Mike Gillette 30-yard field goal	Miami (FL) 7-6
2		Miami (FL)	Cleveland Gary 1-yard run (Carlos Huerta kick)	Miami (FL) 14-6
2		Michigan	Jeffrey Brown 5-yard pass from Michael Taylor (pass failed)	Miami (FL) 14-12
2		Michigan	John Kolesar 18-yard pass from Michael Taylor (Chris Horn run)	Michigan 20-14
3		Michigan	Mike Gillette 29-yard field goal	Michigan 23-14
4		Michigan	Chris Calloway 16-yard pass from Michael Taylor (Mike Gillette kick)	Michigan 30-14
4	5:23	Miami (FL)	Rob Chudzinski 7-yard pass from Steve Walsh (Dale Dawkins pass from Steve Walsh)	Michigan 30-22
4	2:58	Miami (FL)	Cleveland Gary 48-yard pass from Steve Walsh (pass failed)	Michigan 30-28
4	0:43	Miami (FL)	Carlos Huerta 29-yard field goal	Miami (FL) 31-30

=== Wisconsin ===
Wisconsin at #1 Miami (FL)

Team	1	2	3	4	Total
Badgers	3	0	0	0	3
• Hurricanes	0	14	6	3	23

- Date: September 24
- Location: Orange Bowl, Miami, Florida
- Game attendance: 48,311

Scoring summary
Q1	WIS	Mehring 38-yard field goal	WIS 3–0
Q2	MIA	Clark 55-yard fumble return (Huerta kick)	MIA 7–3
Q2	MIA	Brown 26-yard pass from Walsh (Huerta kick)	MIA 14–3
Q3	MIA	Huerta 21-yard field goal	MIA 17–3
Q3	MIA	Huerta 34-yard field goal	MIA 20–3
Q4	MIA	Huerta 30-yard field goal	MIA 23–3

=== Missouri ===
Missouri at #1 Miami (FL)

Team	1	2	3	4	Total
Tigers	0	0	0	0	0
• Hurricanes	21	17	14	3	55

- Date: October 1
- Location: Orange Bowl, Miami, Florida
- Game attendance: 40,654

Scoring summary
Q1	MIA	Chudzinski 29-yard pass from Walsh (Huerta kick)	MIA 7–0
Q1	MIA	Dawkins 9-yard pass from Walsh (Huerta kick)	MIA 14–0
Q1	MIA	Hill 44-yard pass from Walsh (Huerta kick)	MIA 21–0
Q2	MIA	Huerta 34-yard field goal	MIA 24–0
Q2	MIA	Gary 4-yard run (Huerta kick)	MIA 31–0
Q2	MIA	A. Brown 45-yard pass from Erickson (Huerta kick)	MIA 38–0
Q3	MIA	Dawkins 35-yard pass from Walsh (Huerta kick)	MIA 45–0
Q3	MIA	A. Brown 17-yard pass from Erickson (Huerta kick)	MIA 52–0
Q4	MIA	Huerta 47-yard field goal	MIA 55–0

The dominating win over Missouri was Miami's most lopsided victory in 21 years, dating back to a 58–0 win over Pittsburgh in 1967.

=== At Notre Dame ===
#1 Miami (FL) at #4 Notre Dame

Team	1	2	3	4	Total
Hurricanes	0	21	0	9	30
• Fighting Irish	7	14	10	0	31

- Date: October 15
- Location: Notre Dame Stadium,
  Notre Dame, Indiana
- Game start: 2:30 PM
- Game attendance: 59,075
- Game weather: 74 °F (23 °C), Sunny, Wind SW 10–15 mph (16–24 km/h)
- TV announcers (CBS Sports): Brent Musburger, Pat Haden, and John Dockery

Scoring summary
1	3:36	ND	Rice 7-yard run (Ho kick)	ND 7-0
2	12:40	Miami (FL)	A. Brown 8-yard pass from Walsh (Huerta kick)	Tied 7-7
2	7:34	ND	B. Banks 8-yard pass from Rice (Ho kick)	ND 14-7
2		ND	P. Terrell 60-yard interception return (Ho kick)	ND 21-7
2	2:16	Miami (FL)	Conley 23-yard pass from Walsh (Huerta kick)	ND 21-14
2	0:21	Miami (FL)	C. Gary 15-yard pass from Walsh (Huerta kick)	Tied 21-21
3	8:09	ND	P. Eilers 3-yard run (Ho kick)	ND 28-21
3	0:37	ND	Ho 27-yard field goal	ND 31-21
4	13:07	Miami (FL)	Huerta 23-yard field goal	ND 31-24
4	0:45	Miami (FL)	A. Brown 11-yard pass from Walsh (pass failed)	ND 31-30

=== Cincinnati ===
- Steve Walsh 286 Yds, 5 TD (tied school record)

=== At LSU ===
#3 Miami (FL) at #11 LSU

Team	1	2	3	4	Total
• Hurricanes	10	10	0	24	44
Tigers	0	3	0	0	3

- Date: November 19
- Location: Tiger Stadium, Baton Rouge, Louisiana
- Game start: 8:22 pm CST
- Elapsed time: 3:09
- Game attendance: 79,528
- Game weather: 74 °F (23 °C), Overcast, Wind E 16 mph (26 km/h)
- Referee: Jimmy Harper
- TV announcers (ESPN): Bob Carpenter, Kevin Kiley, and Chris Fowler

=== Arkansas ===
#8 Arkansas at #3 Miami (FL)

Team	1	2	3	4	Total
Razorbacks	10	0	6	0	16
• Hurricanes	10	5	0	3	18

- Date: November 26
- Location: Miami Orange Bowl,
  Miami, Florida
- Game start: 12:23 pm EST
- Elapsed time: 3:01
- Game attendance: 63,271
- Game weather: 82 °F (28 °C), Partly Sunny, Wind SE 15–20 mph (24–32 km/h)
- Referee: Mike Dover
- TV announcers (CBS Sports): Brent Musburger, Pat Haden, and John Dockery
- Source: Box Score Archived 2019-08-22 at the Wayback Machine

Scoring summary
1	9:14	Miami	Huerta 36-yard field goal	Miami 3-0
1	4:43	Ark	Trainor 58-yard field goal	Tied 3-3
1	1:41	Miami	Gary 1-yard run (Huerta kick)	Miami 10-3
1	1:29	Ark	Foster 80-yard run (Trainor kick)	Tied 10-10
2	8:30	Miami	Safety, Hawkins tackles Grovey in end zone	Miami 12-10
2	0:03	Miami	Huerta 45-yard field goal	Miami 15-10
3	5:03	Ark	Foster 16-yard pass from Grovey (conversion failed)	Arkansas 16-15
4	5:38	Miami	Huerta 20-yard field goal	Miami 18-16

=== BYU ===
BYU at #2 Miami (FL)

Team	1	2	3	4	Total
Cougars	3	0	14	0	17
• Hurricanes	7	27	0	7	41

- Date: December 3
- Location: Miami Orange Bowl, Miami, Florida
- Game attendance: 59,637
- TV announcers (ESPN): Bob Carpenter, Kevin Kiley, and Chris Fowler

=== Vs. Nebraska (Orange Bowl) ===
#2 Miami (FL) vs. #6 Nebraska

Team	1	2	3	4	Total
• Hurricanes	7	13	0	3	23
Cornhuskers	0	0	3	0	3

- Date: January 1
- Location: Orange Bowl, Miami, Florida
- Game attendance: 79,480
- Referee: Jimmy Harper
- TV announcers (NBC): Don Criqui and Bob Trumpy

Scoring summary
Q1	MIA	Leonard Conley 22-yard pass from Steve Walsh (Huerta kick)	MIA 7–0
Q2	MIA	Huerta 18-yard field goal	MIA 10–0
Q2	MIA	Conley 42-yard pass from Walsh (Huerta kick)	MIA 17–0
Q2	MIA	Huerta 37-yard field goal	MIA 20–0
Q3	Neb	Gregg Barrios 50-yard field goal	MIA 20–3
Q4	MIA	Huerta 37-yard field goal	MIA 23–3

== Personnel ==
=== Roster ===
1988 Miami Hurricanes football team roster
Players
Coaches
Offense

Pos.	#	Name	Class
TE	93	Randy Bethel	So
WR	83	Andre Brown	Sr
OL	52	Darrin Bruce	Sr
WR	81	Wesley Carroll	So
TE	84	Rob Chudzinski	So
RB	28	Leonard Conley	So
FB	20	Shannon Crowell	So
WR	11	Dale Dawkins	Jr
QB	7	Craig Erickson	So
C	50	Bobby Garcia	Jr
RB	43	Cleveland Gary	Sr
G	66	Darren Handy
RB	31	Freddy Highsmith	Sr
WR	3	Randal Hill	So
C	64	Rod Holder	Jr
OL	75	John O'Neill	Sr
G	68	Barry Panfil
OL	73	Leon Searcy	Fr
WR	18	Pee Wee Smith	Jr
WR	35	Darryl Spencer	Fr
G	79	Mike Sullivan	So
QB	4	Steve Walsh	Sr

Defense

Pos.	#	Name	Class
CB	23	Robert Bailey	So
CB	6	Kenny Berry	Jr
LB	91	Rod Carter	Sr
LB	57	Bernard Clark	Jr
LB	49	Maurice Crum	So
DL	44	Shane Curry	So
CB	29	Donald Ellis	Sr
DB	39	Bobby Harden	Jr
DE	54	Bill Hawkins	Sr
DL	63	Jimmie Jones	Jr
DT	96	Cortez Kennedy	Jr
DT	94	Greg Mark	Jr
DL	67	Russell Maryland	So
DB	48	Bubba McDowell	Sr
LB	38	Richard Newbill	Jr
DE	58	Willis Peguese	Jr
DB	2	Charles Pharms	Fr
LB	22	Randy Shannon	Sr
LB	20	Julius Noble	Fr

Special teams

Pos.	#	Name	Class
K	1	Edgar Benes	Jr
K	27	Carlos Huerta	Fr
P	19	Tim Kalal	Jr

Head coach

- Jimmy Johnson (Arkansas)

Coordinators/assistant coaches

- Gary Stevens (John Carroll) – Offensive Coordinator/Quarterbacks
- Dave Wannstedt (Pittsburgh) – Defensive coordinator/Linebackers
- Joe Brodsky (Florida) – Running backs
- Hubbard Alexander (Tennessee State) – Wide receivers
- Tony Wise (Ithaca) – Offensive line
- Butch Davis (Arkansas) – Defensive line

Legend

- (C) Team captain
- (S) Suspended
- (I) Ineligible
- Injured
- Redshirt

=== Coaching staff ===
Name	Position	Seasons	Alma mater
Jimmy Johnson	Head coach	5th	Arkansas (1965)
Gary Stevens	Offensive coordinator/quarterbacks	9th	John Carroll (1965)
Dave Wannstedt	Defensive coordinator/linebackers	3rd	Pittsburgh (1974)
Hubbard Alexander	Wide receivers	10th	Tennessee State (1962)
Joe Brodsky	Running backs	11th	Florida (1956)
Butch Davis	Defensive line	5th	Arkansas (1973)
Art Kehoe	Assistant offensive line	4th	Miami (1982)
Don Soldinger	Tight ends	5th	Memphis (1967)
Tony Wise	Offensive line	4th	Ithaca (1972)
Dave Campo	Defensive backs	2nd	Central Connecticut State (1969)

=== Support staff ===
Name	Position	Seasons	Alma mater
Bill Foran	Strength & Conditioning	4th	Central Michigan (1977)
Tommy Tuberville	Graduate Assistant	3rd	Southern Arkansas (1976)
Ed Orgeron	Graduate Assistant	1st	Northwestern State (1983)

== Awards and honors ==
- Steve Walsh, Sammy Baugh Trophy

=== Jack Harding University of Miami MVP Award ===
- Steve Walsh, QB

== 1989 NFL draft ==
Player	Position	Round	Pick	Team
Bill Hawkins	Defensive end	1	21	Los Angeles Rams
Cleveland Gary	Running back	1	26	Los Angeles Rams
Bubba McDowell	Defensive back	3	77	Houston Oilers
Melvin Bratton	Running back	7	180	Denver Broncos
Rod Carter	Linebacker	10	252	Dallas Cowboys
Randy Shannon	Linebacker	11	280	Dallas Cowboys
