= Tony Wise (American football) =

American football coach (born 1951)

Personal information
- Born: December 28, 1951 (age 74); Albany, New York, U.S.

Career information
- High school: Shaker (NY)
- College: Ithaca

Career history
- Albany (1973) Outside linebackers coach; Bridgeport (1974) Assistant coach; Central Connecticut State (1975) Assistant coach; Washington State (1976) Assistant coach; Pittsburgh (1977–1978) Assistant offensive line coach; Oklahoma State (1979–1983) Offensive line coach; Syracuse (1984) Offensive line coach; Miami (FL) (1985–1988) Offensive line coach; Dallas Cowboys (1989–1992) Offensive line coach; Chicago Bears (1993–1998) Assistant head coach & offensive line coach; Carolina Panthers (1999–2000) Offensive line coach; Miami Dolphins (2001–2004) Offensive line coach; New York Jets (2006–2007) Offensive line coach; Pittsburgh (2008–2010) Offensive line coach

Awards and highlights
- Super Bowl champion (XXVII); National champion (1987)

Anthony Charles Wise (born December 28, 1951) is an American former football coach. He won one Super Bowl with the Dallas Cowboys of the National Football League (NFL) and one national championship at the University of Miami. He played college football at Ithaca College.

== Early life ==
Wise attended Shaker High School, where he practiced football, lacrosse and ice hockey. He accepted a football scholarship from Ithaca College to play as an offensive lineman. He also lettered in lacrosse and ice hockey.

== Coaching career ==
In 1973, he began his football coaching career at Albany. He served one-year stints at the University of Bridgeport, Central Connecticut State University and Washington State University before joining the University of Pittsburgh in 1977. He coached at Oklahoma State University from 1979 to 1983 and Syracuse University in 1984.

He was hired at the University of Miami in 1985. He was a part of the 1987 National Championship team under head coach Jimmy Johnson.

In 1989, he followed head coach Jimmy Johnson and joined the Dallas Cowboys coaching staff as the offensive line coach. He contributed to the team winning Super Bowl XXVII, while developing multiple Pro Bowl players like: Kevin Gogan, Nate Newton, Mark Tuinei, Erik Williams and Mark Stepnoski.

In 1993, he was named the offensive line coach for the Chicago Bears, following former Cowboys defensive coordinator and new Bears head coach Dave Wannstedt. In 1999, he wasn't retained after Dick Jauron replaced Wannstedt as the new Bears head coach.

In 1999, he was hired as the offensive line coach by the Carolina Panthers, contributing to the team averaging 4.3 yards per rush attempt to rank fifth in the NFL. He resigned on December 27, 2000.

In 2001, he joined the Miami Dolphins as their offensive line coach. He spent four seasons with the team and his offensive lines helped produce at the time the two highest individual single-season rushing totals in club history.

In 2006, he signed to be the offensive line coach with the New York Jets.
