= Tony Wise =

Tony Wise may refer to:

- Tony Wise (skiing), founder of the cross-country ski race American Birkebeiner
- Tony Wise (American football) (born 1951), American football coach
