= 1989 Orange Bowl =

1989 Federal Express Orange Bowl
- 55th Orange Bowl
- The Miami Orange Bowl in Miami, Florida, hosted the Orange Bowl.
Miami Hurricanes	Nebraska Cornhuskers
(10–1)	(11–1)
Independent	Big Eight
23	3
Head coach: Jimmy Johnson	Head coach: Tom Osborne
AP / Coaches; 2 / 2	AP / Coaches; 6 / 6
	1	2	3	4	Total
Miami	7	13	0	3	23
Nebraska	0	0	3	0	3
- Date: January 2, 1989
- Season: 1988
- Stadium: Orange Bowl
- Location: Miami, Florida
- MVP: Steve Walsh (Miami QB); Charles Fryer (Nebraska CB)
- Favorite: Miami by 6½ points
- Referee: Jimmy Harper (SEC)
- Attendance: 79,480

United States TV coverage
- Network: NBC
- Announcers: Don Criqui and Bob Trumpy

The 1989 Orange Bowl was the 55th edition of the college football bowl game, played at the Orange Bowl in Miami, Florida, on Monday, January 2. Part of the 1988–89 bowl game season, it matched the independent and second-ranked Miami Hurricanes and the #6 Nebraska Cornhuskers of the Big Eight Conference. Favored Miami won 23–3.

It was a rematch of the 1984 game, in which Miami had won its first national championship. Despite the high rankings of both teams, the game was not determining of the national title since top-ranked and undefeated Notre Dame (which had defeated Miami by one point earlier in the season) convincingly won the Fiesta Bowl in Arizona earlier in the day.

This was the first Orange Bowl that had an official corporate sponsor, Federal Express (now FedEx), who continued to sponsor the bowl until 2010.

== Game summary ==
The rematch did not turn out to be as close as the 1984 game, and Miami led 20–0 at halftime. Nebraska finally scored with a 50-yard field goal in the third quarter, but Miami responded with its own in the fourth. Hurricanes quarterback Steve Walsh also set a new Orange Bowl record with 44 attempted passes, with 21 completions, and was named the game's MVP on offense.

=== Scoring ===
First quarter

- Miami – Leonard Conley 22-yard pass from Steve Walsh (Carlos Huerta kick)

Second quarter

- Miami – Huerta 18-yard field goal
- Miami – Conley 42-yard pass from Walsh (Huerta kick)
- Miami – Huerta 37-yard field goal

Third quarter

- Nebraska – Gregg Barrios 50-yard field goal

Fourth quarter

- Miami – Huerta 37-yard field goal

== Statistics ==
Statistics	Miami	Nebraska
First downs	20	10
Rushes–yards	28–69	38–80
Passing yards	285	55
Passes (C–A–I)	23–48–3	8–22–3
Total offense	76–354	60–135
Return yards	47	31
Punts–average	4–40	9–37
Fumbles–lost	1–0	0–0
Turnovers	3	3
Penalties-yards	7–60	5–45
Time of possession	30:16	29:44

== Aftermath ==
The game was head coach Jimmy Johnson's last with Miami, as he left in February to become the second head coach of the Dallas Cowboys in the NFL.

Miami retained its #2 ranking in the final AP poll and Nebraska fell to tenth.

Nebraska and Miami have since faced off again in the post-season three times, twice in the Orange Bowl in 1992 and 1995, and once in the Rose Bowl in 2002.
