= Nate Newton (American football) =

American football player (born 1961)

No. 67, 61, 73
- Position: Guard

Personal information
- Born: December 20, 1961 (age 64); Orlando, Florida, U.S.
- Listed height: 6 ft 3 in (1.91 m)
- Listed weight: 335 lb (152 kg)

Career information
- High school: Jones (Orlando)
- College: Florida A&M (1979–1982)
- NFL draft: 1983: undrafted

Career history
- Washington Redskins (1983)*; Tampa Bay Bandits (1984–1985); Dallas Cowboys (1986–1998); Carolina Panthers (1999)
- * Offseason or practice squad member only

Awards and highlights
- 3× Super Bowl champion (XXVII, XXVIII, XXX); 2× First-team All-Pro (1994, 1995); 6× Pro Bowl (1992–1996, 1998); USFL All-Time Team; First-team All-MEAC (1980)

Career NFL statistics
- Games played: 198
- Games started: 180
- Fumble recoveries: 5
- Stats at Pro Football Reference

Nathaniel Isaac Newton (born December 20, 1961) is an American former professional football player who was a guard in the National Football League (NFL) for the Dallas Cowboys and Carolina Panthers. He also was a member of the Tampa Bay Bandits of the United States Football League (USFL). He played college football for the Florida A&M Rattlers.

== Early life ==
Newton attended Jones High School where he played football, basketball, wrestling and track and field. In football he played as a fullback until his junior year, when he outgrew the position and was moved to the defensive line.

Although he had Division I colleges recruiting him, he chose to remain close to home and accepted a football scholarship from Florida A&M University. As a sophomore, he played in both the offensive and defensive line. As a junior, he was moved to the offense full-time. As a senior, he received All-MEAC honors playing at right tackle.

In 1994, he was inducted into the Florida A&M University Sports Hall of Fame. In 2022, he was inducted into the Black College Football Hall of Fame.

== Professional career ==
=== Washington Redskins ===
Although he was selected by the Tampa Bay Bandits in the 1983 USFL Territorial Draft, he opted to sign as an undrafted free agent with the Washington Redskins in May. On August 29, 1983, he was waived and was injured in a serious car accident on the same night he was cut.

=== Tampa Bay Bandits ===
In February 1984, he signed with the Tampa Bay Bandits of the defunct United States Football League, who drafted him in 1983, in what the USFL called a Territorial Draft. He played there for two years (1984 and 1985) as an offensive tackle, under head coach Steve Spurrier.

=== Dallas Cowboys ===
In 1986, Newton signed as a free agent with the Dallas Cowboys after the USFL folded. He started out as a reserve offensive lineman, and was nicknamed "the Kitchen" because he was bigger than William "the Refrigerator" Perry, of Chicago Bears fame. Even though he became a starter at left guard in 1987, his struggles to maintain his playing weight almost cost him being waived. Jimmy Johnson became the Cowboys coach in 1989 and eventually moved him to the starting right tackle position and forced him to get into better shape after Johnson beat him in a running race.

In 1992, because of the improved play of Erik Williams, he was moved back to left guard, in order for the team to have the best player combination possible in the offensive line. From 1992 to 1995, together with Erik Williams, Mark Tuinei, Mark Stepnoski, John Gesek and Kevin Gogan, he was part of some of the best offensive lines to play in NFL history, known as “The Great Wall of Dallas”.

Newton was a six-time Pro Bowler, attending the game from 1992 through 1996 and once again in 1998. Only Larry Allen (10), Zack Martin (9), and Tyron Smith (8) have been to more Pro Bowls with the Cowboys on the offensive line. He is tied with Rayfield Wright and John Niland for six appearances each. He was not re-signed by the Cowboys after his contract expired at the end of the 1998 season.

His ability to protect quarterback Troy Aikman and to run-block for running back Emmitt Smith helped the Cowboys win 3 Super Bowls in 1992, 1993, and 1995.

=== Carolina Panthers ===
On June 16, 1999, he signed as a free agent with the Carolina Panthers. He played in seven games as a backup guard. On December 14, he was placed on the injured reserve list with a torn right triceps tendon. He wasn't re-signed after the season.

== Life after football ==
On March 21, 1991, he was arrested at an illegal dog fight which he was a major contributor to. He owned 14 pit bulls. On November 4, 2001, police in St. Martin Parish, Louisiana, arrested Newton after they found him with 213 pounds of marijuana during a traffic stop of his white van. Five weeks later, on December 12, 2001, Newton was again stopped in Texas and arrested after a search of his vehicle revealed 175 pounds of marijuana. He was convicted and sentenced to 30 months in federal prison for drug trafficking. He has since reportedly gone straight, renounced his past, and turned his life around. He later spoke to children involved in athletics about his past. On 12 February 2026, Newton was pardoned by United States President Donald Trump.

In April 2010, Newton, who once weighed as much as 411 pounds, underwent "vertical gastrectomy", a surgical operation, by Dr. David Kim, which removes up to 75 percent of a patient's stomach and staples the remainder. He lost 175 pounds and as of November 2010, weighed 220 pounds—his lightest since high school.

Newton has done radio broadcast work with KESN in the Dallas–Fort Worth metroplex and is a regular contributor to various podcasts broadcast by dallascowboys.com.

== Personal life ==
Newton is the older brother of Tim Newton, who also played in the NFL as a defensive tackle for nine seasons. Tim played for The Minnesota Vikings, Kansas City Chiefs, and Tampa Bay Buccaneers.

Newton's son, Nate III (nicknamed Tré), was a running back at Carroll High School in Southlake, Texas, and was a key contributor for the Dragons' two consecutive 5A football state championship teams in 2005 and 2006. Tré went on to play running back for the University of Texas, although his career was cut short due to recurring injuries. Nate's second son, King, played for the University of Texas at San Antonio.

Newton is a member of the North Dallas Community Bible Church.
