= Rod Carter (American football) =

American football player (born 1966)

No. 91
- Position: Linebacker

Personal information
- Born: October 10, 1966 (age 60); Fort Lauderdale, Florida, U.S.
- Listed height: 6 ft 1 in (1.85 m)
- Listed weight: 228 lb (103 kg)

Career information
- High school: Fort Lauderdale
- College: Miami FL
- NFL draft: 1989: 10th round, 252nd overall pick

Career history
- Dallas Cowboys (1989)*
- * Offseason or practice squad member only

Awards and highlights
- National champion (1987)

Roderick Earl Carter (born October 10, 1966) is an American former professional football linebacker. He played college football at the University of Miami.

== Early life ==
Carter attended Fort Lauderdale High School, where he was a starter at outside linebacker. He accepted a football scholarship from the University of Miami, where he earned a reputation as one of the hardest hitters on the football team. As a freshman in 1985, he was named the starter at strongside linebacker midway through the season, registering 68 tackles (2 for loss), 2 sacks and one forced fumble. As a sophomore in 1986, was named the starter at weakside linebacker, registering 67 tackles (4 for loss) and 2 forced fumbles.

As a junior in 1987, he was second on the team with 138 tackles (seventh in school history) and posted 3.5 sacks. He had 19 tackles against the University of Cincinnati. He was also a part of the school's second national championship.

• Second Team All-South Independent 1987.

As a senior in 1988, he missed the first 2 games with a hamstring and a left knee injury. He regained full strength until midway through the season, recording 88 tackles (second on the team). He led the team with 11 tackles in the 1989 Orange Bowl. He finished his college career with 361 tackles (third in school history), 19 tackles for loss, 6 sacks, 4 passes defensed and 5 forced fumbles.

== Professional career ==
Carter was selected by the Dallas Cowboys in the tenth round (252nd overall) of the 1989 NFL draft. He was released on September 4. In November 1990, he had a try-out with the World League of American Football, but he was not signed by any team.

== Personal life ==
In 1990, he was an assistant football coach at Coconut Creek High School. In 1995, he was an assistant football coach at Northeast High School. In 1997, he made national headlines in a case related to union violence. On August 7, Teamsters Orestes Espinosa, Angel Mielgo, Werner Haechler, Benigno Rojas, and Adrian Paez, beat, kicked and stabbed Carter who was a UPS worker at the time, because he refused to strike. Carter had previously received a threatening phone call from the home of Anthony Cannestro, Sr., president of Teamsters Local 769. The case was settled out of court.
