= Steve Walsh (American football) =

American gridiron football player and coach (born 1966)

Profile
- Position: Head coach

Personal information
- Born: December 1, 1966 (age 59); Saint Paul, Minnesota, U.S.
- Listed height: 6 ft 3 in (1.91 m)
- Listed weight: 215 lb (98 kg)

Career information
- High school: Cretin-Derham Hall (Saint Paul)
- College: Miami (FL) (1985-1988)
- Supplemental draft: 1989: 1st round

Career history

Playing
- Dallas Cowboys (1989–1990); New Orleans Saints (1990-1993); Chicago Bears (1994–1995); St. Louis Rams (1996); Tampa Bay Buccaneers (1997–1998); Indianapolis Colts (1999)

Coaching
- Cardinal Newman HS (FL) (2008–2015) Head coach; Toronto Argonauts (2017) Senior assistant; Saskatchewan Roughriders (2018–2020) Quarterbacks coach; Ottawa Redblacks (2020–2021) Quarterbacks coach; Cretin-Derham Hall HS (MN) (2022–present) Head coach

Operations
- IMG Academy (2015–2016) Director of football

Awards and highlights
- National champion (1987); Consensus All-American (1988); Sammy Baugh Trophy (1988)

Career NFL statistics
- Passing attempts: 1,317
- Passing completions: 713
- Passing yards: 7,875
- Completion percentage: 54.1%
- TD–INT: 40–50
- Passer rating: 66.4
- Stats at Pro Football Reference

Stephen John Walsh (born December 1, 1966) is an American football coach and former player. He played professionally as a quarterback in the National Football League (NFL) for the Dallas Cowboys, New Orleans Saints, Chicago Bears, St. Louis Rams, Tampa Bay Buccaneers, and Indianapolis Colts. He played college football for the Miami Hurricanes, earning consensus All-American honors in 1988.

== Early life ==
Walsh attended Cretin-Derham Hall High School in Saint Paul, Minnesota. As a senior in 1984, he passed for over 2,000 yards and 25 touchdowns, receiving USA Today prep Academic All-America and the Minneapolis-St. Paul Metro football player of the year honors. He also played basketball.

== College career ==
He accepted a football scholarship from the University of Miami. After redshirting a season, he was the backup quarterback to Heisman Trophy winner Vinny Testaverde in 1986.

In 1987, he was named the starter at quarterback over Craig Erickson. He led the Miami Hurricanes to the 1987 national championship (the second for the school), while registering 2,249 passing yards, 19 touchdowns and 7 interceptions.

In 1988, Walsh finished 4th in the Heisman Trophy balloting and runner-up to the Davey O'Brien Award after posting 3,115 passing yards, 29 touchdowns, and 12 interceptions. Against the No. 8 ranked University of Arkansas, he set a school record with 33 completions. He suffered his only defeat as a starter against the University of Notre Dame, 30–31, after passing for 424 yards (second in school history) and losing a shot at the National Championship. He left school in April 1989 and declared for the NFL supplemental draft, skipping his final year of eligibility.

A pro-sized passer, he posted a record of 23–1 in his two seasons. He finished his college career with 410 completions on 690 attempts, 5369 passing yards, 48 touchdowns, 19 interceptions, was sacked only 14 times, and had at least one touchdown pass in 18 of his last 20 games. He was tied with Testaverde for the school record for career touchdown passes (48), before being surpassed by Ken Dorsey in 2002.

In 1999, he was inducted into the University of Miami Sports Hall of Fame. In 2009, he was inducted into the University of Miami Football Ring of Honor.

=== Statistics ===
Year	Team	Comp	Att	Comp %	Passing	TD	INT
1987	Miami	176	298	59.1	2,249	20	7
1988	Miami	233	390	59.7	3,115	29	12

== Professional career ==
=== Dallas Cowboys ===
The Dallas Cowboys surprised observers by selecting Walsh with the second overall pick in the NFL supplemental draft, even though they had selected Troy Aikman number one overall in the 1989 NFL draft and had to surrender by rule an equivalent pick in the 1990 NFL draft, which turned out to be the number one overall selection. Walsh started five games as a rookie while Aikman recovered from a broken finger. He recorded Dallas' only win of the season, a 13–3 victory over the rival Washington Redskins. Against the Kansas City Chiefs, he completed 23 of 36 passes for 294 yards and one touchdown. He recorded 1,371 yards and 5 touchdowns, while working with an inexperienced supporting cast.

Head coach Jimmy Johnson who was his coach in Miami, reportedly favored him as the starter, but Walsh could not move out of Aikman's shadow and was traded to the New Orleans Saints three games into the 1990 season in exchange for first-, second-, and third-round draft picks. With the third draft choice the Cowboys selected (#70-Erik Williams), the other two picks (#14-Leonard Russell and #52-Patrick Rowe) were traded to the New England Patriots as a package to move up to the number one overall draft choice to select Russell Maryland.

=== New Orleans Saints ===
On September 25, 1990, the Dallas Cowboys traded Walsh to the New Orleans Saints for the Saints' first- and third-round picks in the 1991 NFL draft and a second-round pick (that could become a first-round pick based on performance) in the 1992 NFL draft.

The Saints acquired Walsh, because quarterback Bobby Hebert was in the middle of a contract hold out that lasted all season long, and John Fourcade got off to a poor start. He generated high expectations after winning his first game against the Cleveland Browns, while throwing 3 touchdown passes. Walsh passed for 1,970 yards and 12 touchdowns, leading the franchise to its second ever playoff appearance, after finishing the season 8–8 and knocking the Cowboys out of the final playoff spot.

The next year, he lost his job after Hebert returned to the team, and would start only 8 games in the following three seasons, while bouncing between the backup and third-string roles behind Hebert (1991-1992) and Wade Wilson (1993). He was waived on April 24, 1994.

=== Chicago Bears ===
On April 26, 1994, the Chicago Bears signed Walsh as an unrestricted free agent, reuniting with former Cowboys and Hurricanes defensive coordinator Dave Wannstedt. After the third game of the season he replaced an injured Erik Kramer, posting an 8–3 regular season record as a starter and a 35–18 win against the Minnesota Vikings in the wild card round of the playoffs. The next year, Kramer regained the starting job and Walsh would only play in one game.

=== St. Louis Rams ===
On April 10, 1996, he was signed by the St. Louis Rams as a free agent. He started the first three games before being passed on the depth chart by rookie Tony Banks. He completed 33 of 77 passes for 344 yards and had 5 interceptions.

=== Tampa Bay Buccaneers ===
On April 16, 1997, he signed with the Tampa Bay Buccaneers to backup Trent Dilfer. He appeared in 17 games during 2 seasons.

=== Indianapolis Colts ===
On August 11, 1999, he was signed by the Indianapolis Colts to back up second-year pro Peyton Manning. He was released on February 2, 2000. He finished his career with 713 completions in 1,317 attempts (54.1%), 7,875 passing yards, 40 touchdowns and 50 interceptions, for a passer rating of 66.4.

== Coaching career ==
In December 2008, Walsh accepted the head football coaching job at Cardinal Newman High School in West Palm Beach, Florida. After a 4–6 record in his first season, Cardinal Newman finished 7–4 in 2010 and earned its first playoff appearance since 2005. Walsh coached the team to 10-2 records in 2011 and 2012, before losing in the opening round of the 3A playoffs. In 2013, Walsh led Newman to their First District Championship in 10 years and the Regional Final. It was the school's fifth straight playoff appearance. In April 2015, Walsh accepted the Director of Football position at IMG Academy, replacing Chris Weinke. He joined the Toronto Argonauts' coaching staff in 2017 as a senior assistant.

In February 2018, Walsh became the quarterbacks coach for the Saskatchewan Roughriders.

In February 2020, Walsh became the quarterbacks coach for the Ottawa Redblacks.

In December 2021, Walsh was named the head football coach at his high school alma mater, Cretin-Derham Hall in St. Paul, Minnesota. After winning a section championship and returning the program to the state tournament for the first time in 7 years, Walsh will no longer lead the Raiders in 2025 but remains at the school as a major gift officer.

== Personal life ==
In 2001, Walsh entered into the Mortgage Banking business. He returned to football in 2009, when he was named the head coach for Cardinal Newman High School.

Walsh is the uncle of fellow Cretin-Derham Hall High School alumnus and National Hockey League defenseman Ryan McDonagh, who currently plays for the Tampa Bay Lightning. Walsh is married to the former Deanna Lederman and have one child, Brayden. Walsh has three older children, Haille, Jordan and Cameron as well.

== Head coaching record ==
Year	Team	Overall	Conference	Standing	Bowl/playoffs
Cardinal Newman Crusaders () (2009–2014)
2009	Cardinal Newman	3–7	2–4	6th	
2010	Cardinal Newman	7–4	3–1	2nd	
2011	Cardinal Newman	9–2	5–1	2nd	Section Runner-Up
2012	Cardinal Newman	9–2	3–1	2nd	Section Runner-Up
2013	Cardinal Newman	8–4	2–1	3rd	Section Champion
2014	Cardinal Newman	4–6	1–1	2nd	
Cardinal Newman:		40–25	17–12		
Cretin-Derham Hall Raiders () (2022–present)
2022	Cretin-Derham Hall	2–8	1–5	5th	
2023	Cretin-Derham Hall	5–6	0–4	5th	Section Runner-Up
2024	Cretin-Derham Hall	6-5	1-3	4th	Section Champions
Cretin-Derham Hall:		13–19	2-12		
Total:		53–44			

== See also ==
- List of NCAA major college football yearly passing leaders
