= Joe Brodsky =

American football player and coach (1934–2006)

Profile
- Position: Fullback

Personal information
- Born: June 9, 1934; Miami, Florida, U.S.
- Died: May 25, 2006 (aged 70); Miami Lakes, Florida, U.S.

Career information
- High school: Miami Jackson (FL)
- College: Florida
- NFL draft: 1957: 16th round, 189th overall pick

Career history

Playing
- Winnipeg Blue Bombers (1957)*
- * Offseason or practice squad member only

Coaching
- Miami Jackson High School (1965–1970) Head coach; Hialeah-Miami Lakes High School (1971–1977) Head coach; Miami (FL) (1978–1988) Running backs coach; Dallas Cowboys (1989–1997) Running backs coach; Chicago Bears (1998) Running backs coach

Awards and highlights
- 3× Super Bowl champion (XXVII, XXVIII, XXX); 2× National champion (1983, 1987); Florida state football championship (1975)

Joseph Brodsky (June 9, 1934 – May 25, 2006) was an American football coach. He won three Super Bowls with the Dallas Cowboys of the National Football League (NFL) and two national championships at the University of Miami. He played college football at the University of Florida.

== Early life ==
Brodsky attended Miami Jackson High School, where he practiced football, basketball and baseball. As a senior, he was a fullback on the first Miami Jackson team to defeat Miami High School in 27 years.

He was a teammate of Lee Corso, who became a college head coach and sportscaster. Brodsky graduated in 1952 and received All-state honors.

== College career ==
Brodsky accepted a football scholarship from the University of Florida in Gainesville where he was a two-way player at fullback and linebacker. As a sophomore, he was the team's leading rusher with 82 carries for 378 yards (4.6-yard avg.). He had 2 receptions for 11 yards, a touchdown and a kickoff return for 13 yards. He was a defensive line backup. As a junior, he had injuries and only played in 7 games, registering 24 carries for 92 yards (3.6-yard avg.).

As a senior, he had no rushing statistics but he had 5 interceptions and set 3 individual school records for interceptions. In the season opener against Mississippi State University, he intercepted 3 passes and returned them for an NCAA record 162 yards. He set a school record with most yards returned from pass interceptions in a single-season (244 yards). He was in track and lettered four years in both sports. In 2002, he was inducted into the University of Florida Athletic Hall of Fame.

== Professional career ==
Brodsky was selected by the Washington Redskins in the 16th round (189th overall) of the 1957 NFL draft. He instead opted to sign a contract with the Winnipeg Blue Bombers to play professional football in Winnipeg, Canada. He was waived before the start of the season.

== Coaching career ==
In 1965, he began his coaching career in Miami Jackson High School in Miami helping turn around the team's record. In 1971, he helped to launch the football program in Hialeah-Miami Lakes High School in Hialeah, Florida, where he coached his 2 sons, became one of the most successful head coaches in South Florida, and won a State Championship in 1975. Future NFL assistant coaches Joe Avezzano and Jerry Sullivan were some of his players.

In 1978, he joined Lou Saban's coaching staff at the University of Miami in Coral Gables, Florida as the running back coach. He was a part of the 1983 National Championship team under head coach Howard Schnellenberger. He was a part of the 1987 National Championship team under head coach Jimmy Johnson. He also helped to develop players including Ottis Anderson, Albert Bentley, Keith Griffin, Alonzo Highsmith, Warren Williams, Cleveland Gary, Melvin Bratton, and Leonard Conley.

In 1989, he followed head coach Jimmy Johnson and joined the Dallas Cowboys coaching staff as the running back coach. He helped to develop Pro Football Hall of Famer and the NFL's All-time leading rusher Emmitt Smith and Pro Bowl fullback Daryl Johnston. He also contributed to the team winning Super Bowl XXVII, XXVIII and XXX. In 1998, he was named the running backs coach for the Chicago Bears, reuniting with former Cowboys defensive coordinator Dave Wannstedt. In 1999, he was not retained on the staff after Dick Jauron replaced Wannstedt as the new Bears head coach.

== Personal life ==
His son Larry was fifth on the University of Miami All-time receiving list and also played in the United States Football League. Joe Brodsky died after a long battle with prostate cancer on May 25, 2006.
