= Nate Kirtman =

American businessperson and football player (born 1971)

Profile
- Position: Safety

Personal information
- Born: June 6, 1971 (age 55); Berkeley, California, U.S.
- Listed height: 6 ft 1 in (1.85 m)
- Listed weight: 186 lb (84 kg)

Career information
- High school: Saint Mary's College (Berkeley)
- College: Pomona-Pitzer
- NFL draft: 1992: 9th round, 248th overall pick

Career history
- Dallas Cowboys (1992)*
- * Offseason or practice squad member only

Nathaniel Kirtman III (born June 6, 1971) is an American businessperson and former professional football player. As of 2021, he is a consultant for Blue Green Technologies. Previously, he was senior vice president for corporate public relations at NBC Entertainment.

== Early life and college ==
Kirtman went to Saint Mary's College High School, a private school in Berkeley, California. He then attended Pomona College, where he majored in government and played football for the Pomona-Pitzer Sagehens. He graduated in 1992.

== Football career ==
Kirtman was selected in the ninth round of the 1992 NFL draft by the Dallas Cowboys.

== Business career ==
Kirtman began working for NBC Entertainment in 1998. Between 2002 and 2006, he worked for General Electric. He then returned to NBC, and in 2012 was promoted to senior vice president for corporate public relations. He left NBC in 2015. As of 2021, he is a consultant for Blue Green Technologies, a water technology company that seeks to prevent algal blooms. He is a member of the California Lottery Commission, and was previously its chair. He is also on the board of trustees of Pomona and St. Mary's.

== Personal life ==
As of 2012, Kirtman lives in the Sherman Oaks neighborhood of Los Angeles. He is a Democrat.
