= Erik Williams =

American football player (born 1968)

No. 79, 76
- Position: Offensive tackle

Personal information
- Born: September 7, 1968 (age 58); Philadelphia, Pennsylvania, U.S.
- Listed height: 6 ft 5 in (1.96 m)
- Listed weight: 311 lb (141 kg)

Career information
- High school: John Bartram (Philadelphia)
- College: Central State
- NFL draft: 1991: 3rd round, 70th overall pick

Career history
- Dallas Cowboys (1991–2000); Baltimore Ravens (2001)

Awards and highlights
- 3× Super Bowl champion (XXVII, XXVIII, XXX); 3× First-team All-Pro (1993, 1995, 1996); 4× Pro Bowl (1993, 1996, 1997, 1999); Little All-American (1990)

Career NFL statistics
- Games played: 146
- Games started: 133
- Fumble recoveries: 1
- Stats at Pro Football Reference

Erik George Williams (born September 7, 1968) is an American former professional football player who was an offensive tackle in the National Football League (NFL) for the Dallas Cowboys and Baltimore Ravens. He played college football at Central State University in Wilberforce, Ohio, where he was an NAIA All-American offensive lineman. Williams was a third-round selection in the 1991 NFL draft.

== Early life ==
Williams attended John Bartram High School. As a senior, he was a powerful defensive lineman, receiving All-Public League honors. He also competed in the shot put and discus throw. Poor grades prevented him from obtaining an NCAA Division I scholarship, so he enrolled at Central State University in Wilberforce, Ohio. He played under hall of fame football coach Billy Joe.

As a redshirt freshman, he was converted to play the offensive left tackle position. As a sophomore, he was named the starter at left tackle and became a dominant player at the NAIA level and an All-American.

During his collegiate career from 1987 through 1990, the team won a total of 41 games with just seven losses and one tie. In 1990, Williams helped the Marauders to the NAIA national championship. It was the first of three Central State University national titles during the decade. That championship season Williams helped the offense average 492 yards and 54.8 points per game and set an NAIA record for most points in a single season with 594 points.

In 2010, Williams was inducted into the Central State University Sports Hall of Fame. In 2020, he was inducted into the Black College Football Hall of Fame.

== Professional career ==
Pre-draft measurables
Height	Weight	Arm length	Hand span	40-yard dash	10-yard split	20-yard split	20-yard shuttle	Vertical jump	Broad jump	Bench press
6 ft 5 in (1.96 m)	304 lb (138 kg)	32 in (0.81 m)	10 5/8 in (0.27 m)	5.50 s	1.90 s	3.18 s	4.90 s	21.5 in (0.55 m)	8 ft 0 in (2.44 m)	25 reps
All values from NFL Combine

=== Dallas Cowboys ===
Williams was selected by the Dallas Cowboys in the third round (70th overall) of the 1991 NFL draft, with a choice from the Steve Walsh trade. He played sparingly as a rookie, as a backup to Nate Newton at right tackle. Williams' level of play during the 1992 training camp forced the Cowboys to move back Newton to left guard, in order to have the best players available on the offensive line.

In 1992, he was named the Cowboys' starting right tackle. He earned national recognition, when he held future Hall of Fame defensive end Reggie White without a sack in a 20–10 Dallas win. He received the NFC's Offensive Player of the Week award, becoming the first offensive lineman in Cowboys history to win the award.

Nicknamed "Big E", by 1993, his physical play and aggressive attitude that was rarely seen on the offensive side of the ball, made Williams the top offensive lineman in the NFL. These traits were mentioned by defensive end Michael Strahan in his Professional Football Hall of Fame enshrinement speech.

On October 24, 1994, Williams was involved in a serious one-car accident which caused him to miss the remainder of the season. Williams suffered a damaged right knee as well as a broken rib, torn ligaments in his left thumb and facial lacerations that required plastic surgery. A magnetic scan on the knee indicated two torn ligaments—the medial collateral and posterior cruciate—and a torn muscle.

In 1995, although he regained his starting position, he couldn't reach his previous high level of play, but still was good enough to help the team win Super Bowl XXX. In 2000, he started in 16 games and allowed 7.5 sacks. On March 7, 2001, he was released in a salary cap move.

Williams was a three-time All-Pro and four-time Pro Bowler, playing in the 1993, 1996, 1997, and 1999 Pro Bowls. His ability to protect quarterback Troy Aikman and to run-block for running back Emmitt Smith helped the Cowboys win Super Bowls in 1992, 1993 and 1995.

From 1992 to 1994, together with Nate Newton, Mark Tuinei, Mark Stepnoski and Kevin Gogan, Williams was part of some of the best offensive lines to play in NFL history, later dubbed "The Great Wall of Dallas".

His dominant play and three Super Bowl rings, have led many sports writers and players to proclaim that if not for the injuries he suffered in his near-fatal 1994 auto accident, he would have been inducted into the Pro Football Hall of Fame.

=== Baltimore Ravens ===
On August 28, 2001, he signed as a free agent with the Baltimore Ravens. He appeared in 5 games and was mostly used as a reserve right tackle behind Sammy Williams. On November 20, 2001, he was placed on the reserve-retired list.

== Personal life ==
Williams was accused of sexual assault in 1995 for which he was acquitted. An accusation of rape in 1997 was dismissed when it was discovered the woman had made a false police report for which she was both charged and sued. In 2002, he was arrested and arraigned on charges of assaulting his wife, Chanda, who fled the home and alerted police.

He is a member of Phi Beta Sigma fraternity. He appeared on the cover of the video game Madden NFL '95 with San Francisco 49ers defensive lineman Karl Wilson. After his playing career was over, he maintained a low profile, while spending time serving a coaching internship with the Cowboys, and a coaching stint at his alma mater Central State University.
