= Mark Stepnoski =

American football player (born 1967)

No. 70, 53
- Position: Center

Personal information
- Born: January 20, 1967 (age 59); Erie, Pennsylvania, U.S.
- Listed height: 6 ft 2 in (1.88 m)
- Listed weight: 265 lb (120 kg)

Career information
- High school: Cathedral (Erie)
- College: Pittsburgh
- NFL draft: 1989: 3rd round, 57th overall pick

Career history
- Dallas Cowboys (1989–1994); Houston / Tennessee Oilers (1995–1998); Dallas Cowboys (1999–2001)

Awards and highlights
- 2× Super Bowl champion (XXVII, XXVIII); First-team All-Pro (1992); 2× Second-team All-Pro (1994, 1996); 5× Pro Bowl (1992–1996); NFL 1990s All-Decade Team; Consensus All-American (1988); 2× First-team All-East (1986, 1988); Second-team All-East (1987); Pennsylvania All-Century Team

Career NFL statistics
- Games played: 194
- Games started: 182
- Fumble recoveries: 7
- Stats at Pro Football Reference

Mark Matthew Stepnoski (born January 20, 1967) is an American former professional football player who was an offensive lineman in the National Football League (NFL). He attended Cathedral Preparatory School in Erie, Pennsylvania, and went on to star at the University of Pittsburgh. He played 13 seasons in the NFL, with the Dallas Cowboys from 1989 to 1994, with the Houston / Tennessee Oilers from 1995 to 1998, and back to the Cowboys for three more seasons. Stepnoski won two Super Bowls with the Cowboys and was selected to five consecutive Pro Bowls from 1992 to 1996.

== Early life ==
Stepnoski, was a highly recruited All-State and Parade All-American offensive tackle from Erie Cathedral Preparatory School. He graduated from the school in 1985.

He signed with the University of Pittsburgh and became a four-year starter at offensive guard, helping clear the way for Craig Heyward and Curvin Richards to become two of the leading rushers in the nation.

Stepnoski was a third-team All-American as a sophomore, a consensus first-team All-American in 1988 and a finalist for the Outland Trophy as a senior. He was a two-time Academic All-American (1986 and 1988). He also played in the East–West Shrine Game.

== Professional career ==
Pre-draft measurables
Height	Weight	Arm length	Hand span	Vertical jump	Broad jump
6 ft 2 3/8 in (1.89 m)	270 lb (122 kg)	33 3/8 in (0.85 m)	10 1/8 in (0.26 m)	29.0 in (0.74 m)	8 ft 5 in (2.57 m)

Pre-draft measurables
! 40-yard dash	10-yard split	20-yard split	20-yard shuttle	Bench press
5.01 s	1.68 s	2.89 s	4.53 s	29 reps

All values from NFL Combine

=== Dallas Cowboys (first stint) ===
Stepnoski was selected by the Dallas Cowboys in the third round of the 1989 NFL draft. He dropped in the draft because the scouts thought he was undersized for the National Football League.

The Cowboys switched him to center, although he had never played that position. During his rookie year he was tutored by Tom Rafferty, who was playing his last season in the NFL. He became a starter for the last four games of the season. Stepnoski used his athletic ability, leverage and balance to outmaneuver bigger defensive players and become one of the league's best centers of his era. By the end of the 1991 season he was selected to the first of five straight Pro Bowls. From 1992 to 1994, together with Erik Williams, Mark Tuinei, Nate Newton and Kevin Gogan, he was part of some of the best offensive lines to play in NFL history, that also helped pave the way for Emmitt Smith to become the NFL's all-time leading rusher. In 1993, he suffered a knee injury that required surgery while playing against the Minnesota Vikings in the 13th game of the season. He was replaced by John Gesek and couldn't play during the playoffs and Super Bowl XXVIII. He became a free agent at the end of the season, but the Cowboys could only sign him to a one-year contract ($1.2 million and a $500,000 signing bonus).

Stepnoski was one of the team's first big-name players to leave the Cowboys following the 1994 season via unrestricted free agency, leaving with three Pro Bowls and back-to-back Super Bowl victories.

=== Houston / Tennessee Oilers ===
Stepnoski signed with the Houston Oilers in 1995. During his first two seasons with the Oilers he increased his streak of Pro Bowl selections to five. Stepnoski played two more seasons with the team upon their relocation to Nashville.

=== Dallas Cowboys (second stint) ===
The Cowboys signed Stepnoski as a free agent in 1999, where he finished his career with three more years, retiring after the 2001 season.

=== Career achievements ===
Stepnoski played 13 seasons in the National Football League, which included five consecutive Pro Bowl appearances (1992–1996) and a place on the National Football League 1990s All-Decade second team. He won two Super Bowls with the Dallas Cowboys (XXVII and XXVIII) and was a nominee for the Pro Football Hall of Fame class of 2007.

== Cannabis advocacy ==
During the early 2000s, Stepnoski served as president of the Texas chapter of the National Organization for the Reform of Marijuana Laws (NORML). He became a lifetime member of NORML in 1998 when he contributed $2000 to the organization. He kept private his views as an active player though, not wanting to create a distraction for his team. As an active player, Stepnoski says he occasionally used cannabis for pain relief.

Stepnoski's advocacy caused his high school alma mater, Cathedral Preparatory School, to cancel his induction into the school's athletic hall of fame. His efforts also drew the ire of the Office of National Drug Control Policy under President George W. Bush. A spokesperson stated: "It's really kind of sad that someone who could use his role as a role model for young children chooses not to use it constructively, but to use it for something that has caused devastation for families throughout this country."

== Personal life ==
Stepnoski moved to Vancouver, British Columbia, in 2003. He has a son.

In a 2007 interview, Stepnoski expressed support for the 9/11 truth movement.
