= Troy Aikman =

American football player (born 1966)

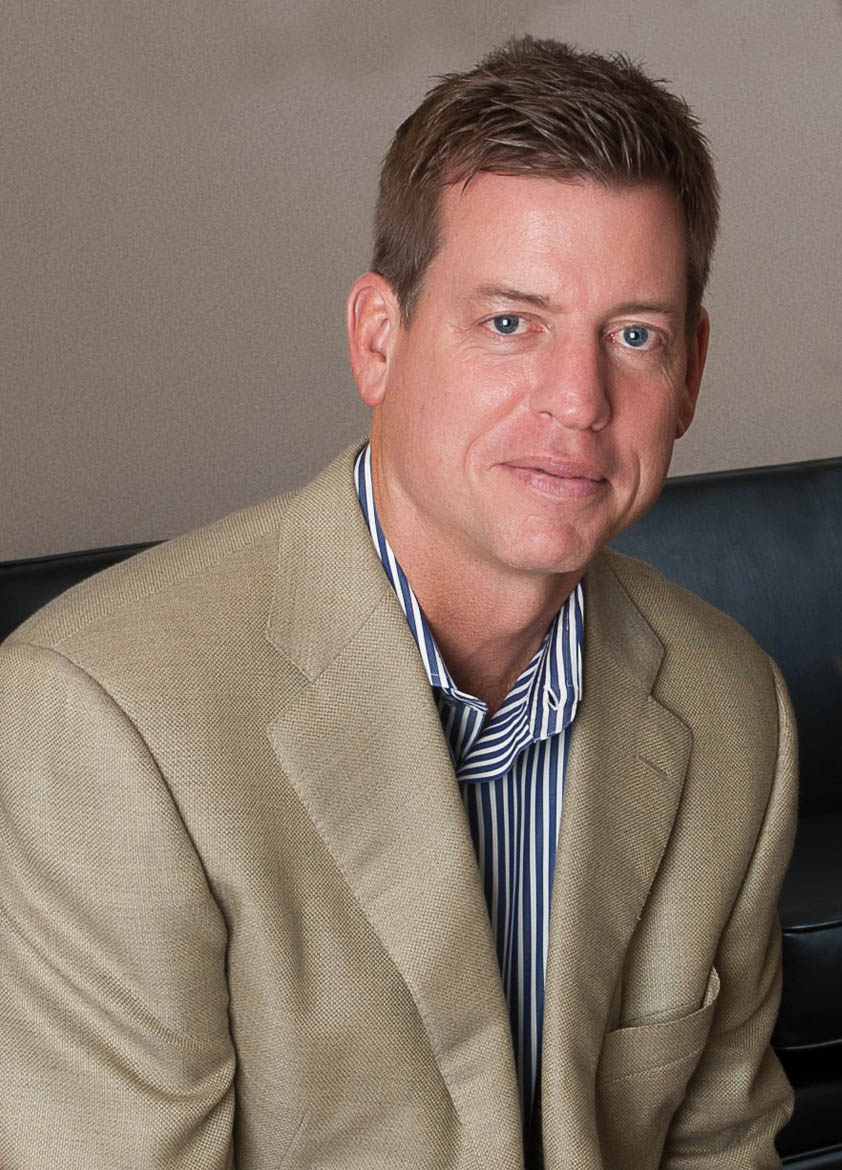
- Aikman in 2011

No. 8
- Position: Quarterback

Personal information
- Born: November 21, 1966 (age 60); West Covina, California, U.S.
- Listed height: 6 ft 4 in (1.93 m)
- Listed weight: 219 lb (99 kg)

Career information
- High school: Henryetta (Henryetta, Oklahoma)
- College: Oklahoma (1984–1985); UCLA (1986–1988)
- NFL draft: 1989: 1st round, 1st overall pick

Career history
- Dallas Cowboys (1989–2000)

Awards and highlights
- 3× Super Bowl champion (XXVII, XXVIII, XXX); Super Bowl MVP (XXVII); NFL Man of the Year (1997); 6× Pro Bowl (1991–1996); NFL completion percentage leader (1993); PFWA All-Rookie Team (1989); Dallas Cowboys Ring of Honor; National champion (1985); Davey O'Brien Award (1988); Consensus All-American (1988); Second-team All-American (1987); Pac-10 Offensive Player of the Year (1987); First-team All-Pac-10 (1987); UCLA Bruins No. 8 retired

Career NFL statistics
- Passing attempts: 4,715
- Passing completions: 2,898
- Completion percentage: 61.5%
- TD–INT: 165–141
- Passing yards: 32,942
- Passer rating: 81.6
- Stats at Pro Football Reference
- Pro Football Hall of Fame
- College Football Hall of Fame

Troy Kenneth Aikman (/ˈeɪkmən/; born November 21, 1966) is an American former professional football quarterback who played in the National Football League (NFL) for 12 seasons with the Dallas Cowboys. After transferring from the Oklahoma Sooners, he played college football for the UCLA Bruins and won the Davey O'Brien Award in 1988. Aikman was selected first overall in the 1989 NFL draft by the Cowboys, where he was named to six Pro Bowls and won three Super Bowls. He was also named MVP of Super Bowl XXVII, the franchise's first title in over a decade. Aikman was inducted to the Pro Football Hall of Fame in 2006 and the College Football Hall of Fame in 2008.

After retiring in 2000, Aikman served as the color commentator of NFL on Fox from 2001 to 2021 and has served as the color commentator of Monday Night Football on ESPN and ABC since 2022. He and his partner play-by-play announcer Joe Buck remain the longest tenured announcer pairing in NFL history. Aikman was a co-owner of the now defunct NASCAR Sprint Cup Series team Hall of Fame Racing from 2005 to 2009 along with fellow former Cowboys quarterback Roger Staubach and is also a part-owner of the San Diego Padres in Major League Baseball (MLB).

== Early life ==
Aikman was born on November 21, 1966. He spent the first part of his childhood in Cerritos, California. At age 12, Aikman and his family moved to Henryetta, Oklahoma, where he played football and baseball at Henryetta High School, earning All-State honors. He also won the 1983 Oklahoma high school state championship in typing.

== College career ==
=== Oklahoma Sooners ===
The New York Mets offered Aikman a contract out of high school, but instead of playing baseball he chose to play football and attended the University of Oklahoma under head coach Barry Switzer.

In 1984, he became the first freshman to start at quarterback for Oklahoma since World War II. In 1985, his first full season as a collegiate starter, Aikman led the Sooners to wins over Minnesota, Kansas State, and No. 17 Texas in the Red River Shootout before losing to the Miami Hurricanes as he left the game with a broken ankle. He also lost to his future teammate Michael Irvin and head coach Jimmy Johnson, who also scouted him when he was the head coach of Oklahoma State.

On October 19, Miami's Jerome Brown broke through the offensive line, sacked Aikman at the Sooners' 29-yard line, and broke Aikman's ankle. Aikman, who had been six of eight passing for 131 yards, would be out for the season. Switzer and offensive coordinator Jim Donnan were forced to switch back to the wishbone offense under freshman quarterback Jamelle Holieway. The team went on to win the 1985 National Championship. With Holieway established as the starting quarterback at OU, Aikman decided to transfer to UCLA.

=== UCLA Bruins ===
Barry Switzer oversaw Aikman's transfer to UCLA, which was coached by Terry Donahue and more effective for a passing quarterback. He had to sit out a year due to college transfer rules but went on to lead the Bruins to a 20–4 record over two seasons.

As a junior, Aikman was named Pac-10 Offensive Player of the Year, throwing for 2,525 yards, 17 touchdowns, and 8 interceptions. He led the Bruins to a 10–2 record and the 1987 Aloha Bowl, where they beat the Florida Gators by a score of 20–16.

As a senior, Aikman threw for 2,771 yards, 24 touchdowns, and 9 interceptions. He won the 1988 Davey O'Brien Award as the nation's top quarterback, a first for UCLA. He was a Consensus All-American, the UPI West Coast Player of the Year, the Washington DC Club QB of the Year, a finalist for the 1988 AFCA "Coaches Choice" Player of the year award, and finished third in voting for the 1988 Heisman Trophy. UCLA matched the victory total from the previous season under Aikman, going 10–2 and losing only to USC and Washington State. The 1988 season culminated with a 17–3 Bruins victory over the Arkansas Razorbacks in the 1989 Cotton Bowl Classic, which was played in Dallas. The Dallas media spent most of the Cotton Bowl Classic week promoting Aikman as the "next quarterback of the Cowboys," and much was made of Cowboys head coach Tom Landry watching Aikman practice during the Bruins' workouts at Texas Stadium. Aikman finished his career as the number two career passing leader in UCLA history.

In 2008, Aikman was elected to the College Football Hall of Fame. On November 28, 2014, UCLA retired his #8 jersey at halftime against Stanford.

== Professional career ==
Aikman was selected as the first overall pick in the 1989 NFL draft by the Dallas Cowboys. On February 25, 1989, new owner Jerry Jones fired Tom Landry and replaced him with Jimmy Johnson. A few months later, in the NFL's supplemental draft, Johnson drafted Steve Walsh, who played for Johnson at the University of Miami. Aikman won the starting quarterback job, and Walsh was traded early in the 1990 season.

Aikman played his first NFL preseason game on August 26, 1989, against the Denver Broncos. His NFL debut started with a 28–0 loss to the New Orleans Saints. The following week, Aikman threw his first touchdown pass, a 65-yard completion to Michael Irvin, but the Atlanta Falcons intercepted two passes and won. In a game against the Phoenix Cardinals, he threw for 379 yards to set an NFL rookie record. Aikman finished 1989 with a 0–11 record as a starter, completing 155 of 293 passes for 1,749 yards, 9 touchdowns, and 18 interceptions.

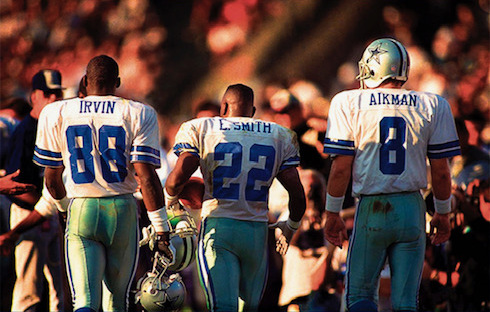
The trio (pictured) of Aikman, Emmitt Smith, and Michael Irvin nicknamed "The Triplets" won three Super Bowls and is considered one of the greatest in NFL history.

Following Aikman's rookie season, Dallas selected Florida Gators running back Emmitt Smith in the first round of the 1990 NFL draft. With Smith and Irvin, Aikman led the Cowboys to a 7–7 record in the 1990 season but was injured in the 15th game, against the Philadelphia Eagles. The Cowboys would go on to lose that game and the following week against the Atlanta Falcons with backup quarterback Babe Laufenberg, missing the final playoff wild card spot by one game.

In 1991, Aikman led the Cowboys to a 6–4 record in the first 10 games and had the Cowboys ahead in week 12 against an undefeated Washington Redskins team when he was injured. Steve Beuerlein replaced Aikman, and Dallas finished the season 5–0 and earned the #5 playoff seed. Beuerlein went on to lead the Cowboys to a road upset over the #4 seed Chicago Bears in the wild card round. With the Cowboys trailing 17–6 at halftime the following week against the Detroit Lions in the NFC Divisional Playoff game, Aikman was inserted to start the third quarter but was unable to provide a spark as the Cowboys lost, 38–6. Aikman was selected to the first of six consecutive Pro Bowls.

In 1992, Aikman set career highs in completions (302), passing yards (3,445), and touchdown passes (23), and led the Cowboys to a team record 13 regular-season victories and the second-best record in the NFC. During the playoffs, Aikman broke Joe Montana's record of 83 passes without an interception by throwing 89. The Cowboys defeated the Philadelphia Eagles at home in the divisional round and squared off against the San Francisco 49ers in the NFC Championship, a matchup that featured the two best teams in the NFC. The Cowboys won, 30–20, with Aikman completing two game-changing passes to send the Cowboys to their first Super Bowl appearance since 1978. In Super Bowl XXVII against the Buffalo Bills, Aikman led the Cowboys to a 52–17 victory (coincidentally the game was played in his alma mater's home stadium, the Rose Bowl). Aikman was named Super Bowl MVP after completing 22 of 30 passes for 273 yards and 4 touchdowns.

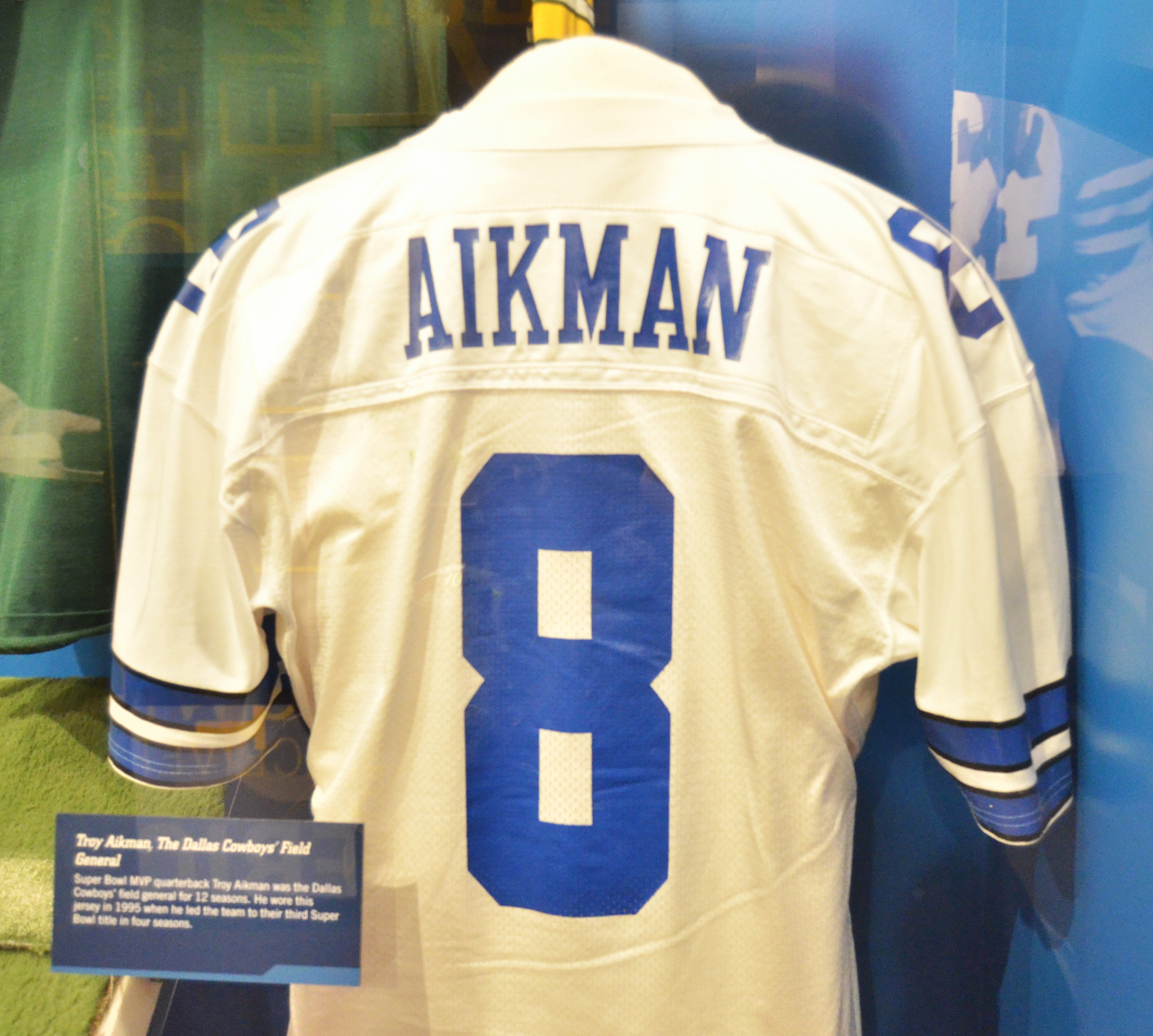
Troy Aikman jersey worn in the 1995 season, exhibited at the Pro Football Hall of Fame in Canton, OH

In 1993, the Cowboys finished 12–4, the best record in the NFC. In the playoffs, Aikman again led the Cowboys to a home playoff win, this time over a young, upstart Green Bay Packers squad led by quarterback Brett Favre, who was in his first full season as a starting quarterback. Aikman then shredded the San Francisco 49ers secondary in the NFC Championship 38–21, before leaving the game with a concussion after 49ers defensive tackle Dana Stubblefield's knee hit Aikman's head. Aikman now says he has no memory of playing in the game. In Super Bowl XXVIII, Aikman was kept out of the end zone, but a combination of key turnovers by the Buffalo Bills offense and the running of Emmitt Smith helped lead to a 30–13 victory for the Cowboys.

Head coach Jimmy Johnson left the team on March 29, 1994, and Jerry Jones hired Barry Switzer, Aikman's former college coach at Oklahoma. In 1994, the Cowboys finished with the second-best record in the NFC (behind the San Francisco 49ers) and Aikman again missed playing time due to injuries. The Cowboys won their Divisional Playoff game against the Green Bay Packers 35–9, but fell to the 49ers in the NFC Championship, 38–28.

In 1995, Aikman passed for over 3,300 yards as the Cowboys once again finished with the best record in the NFC, with the San Francisco 49ers having the second-best record. Aikman was knocked out of a highly anticipated rematch between the Cowboys and 49ers when Stubblefield landed on Aikman, forcing his knee to hit the turf. After a playoff loss at home by the 49ers to the Green Bay Packers, the Cowboys faced the Packers in the NFC Championship and, for the third straight season, knocked the Packers out of the playoffs, this time by a 38–27 score, to earn their third Super Bowl appearance in four years. The Cowboys won Super Bowl XXX against the Pittsburgh Steelers 27–17, with Aikman throwing one touchdown pass.

In 1996, despite offensive troubles, Aikman again helped lead the Cowboys to another NFC East Division title and a home game in the wild card round, a 40–15 win over the Minnesota Vikings. The following week, the Cowboys fell in the divisional round to the Carolina Panthers, 26–17.

In 1997, Aikman became the first quarterback in Cowboys history to have three straight 3,000-yard seasons, but the team finished 6–10 and missed the playoffs for the first time since 1990. Switzer suffered the first losing season of his career and resigned at the end of the season.

1998 was a rebound year for Aikman and the Cowboys, and despite missing five games, Aikman again helped lead the Cowboys back to the NFC East title and the playoffs. The Cowboys were upset at home in the wild card round as the #6 seed Arizona Cardinals won, 20–7.

The 1999 season started off strong for Aikman and the Cowboys as they faced the Washington Redskins. Aikman threw a career-high five touchdown passes, including the game-winner in overtime to beat the Redskins. 1999 also marked the final playoff appearance for Aikman, and the final season the trio of Aikman, Irvin, and Emmitt Smith would play together. The Cowboys finished 8–8 and lost in the wild card round to the Minnesota Vikings, 27–10.

The 2000 season was Aikman's last season as a professional football player. Aikman suffered several concussions during the season, and a revolving door at quarterback took place between Aikman and former Eagles quarterback Randall Cunningham. Aikman's final game was at home against the Washington Redskins. He was hit by linebacker LaVar Arrington and suffered the tenth and final concussion of his career.

During the 2001 offseason, Aikman was waived a day before he was due a $70 million/7-year contract extension, and ultimately announced his retirement on April 9, after failing to find another team. He ended his career as the Cowboys' all-time leading passer (32,942 yards). 90 of his 94 career wins were in the 1990s and the most of any quarterback in any decade until Peyton Manning surpassed him in the 2000s with 115 wins. Aikman is currently third on that list, also trailing Tom Brady (122 in the 2010s).

In a late December 2013 radio interview, Aikman said the real reason he retired was due to persistent back issues he had in his final season. Aikman explained that he had back surgery in the offseason following Super Bowl XXVII with no complications but by the time he reached his final season he was constantly getting treatment for back pain. While the hit by Arrington ended his 2000 season, he claims it was the back pain and not that concussion that ended his career. In a January 2020 interview, Aikman said he wanted to sign with the San Diego Chargers after being released by the Cowboys in the 2001 offseason to play for Norv Turner (Aikman's former offensive coordinator in Dallas), but they signed Doug Flutie instead and Aikman chose to retire. He said Andy Reid called him after Eagles starting quarterback Donovan McNabb suffered a broken ankle in week 11 of the 2002 season to offer him the starting position, but Aikman declined. In 2003, Aikman agreed to play for the Miami Dolphins with Turner as their offensive coordinator and began training again, but the team decided not to sign a contract with him.

== Career statistics ==
=== NFL ===
Legend
| | Super Bowl MVP |
| | Won the Super Bowl |
| | NFL record |
| | Led the league |
| **Bold** | Career high |
| Underline | Incomplete data |

==== Regular season ====
| Year | Team | Games | | | Passing | | | | | | | | | Rushing | | | | | Sacked | | Fumbles | |
| Year | Team | GP | GS | Record | Cmp | Att | Pct | Yds | Y/A | Lng | TD | Int | Rtg | Att | Yds | Y/A | Lng | TD | Sck | SckY | Fum | Lost |
|---|---|---|---|---|---|---|---|---|---|---|---|---|---|---|---|---|---|---|---|---|---|---|
| 1989 | DAL | 11 | 11 | 0−11 | 155 | 293 | 52.9 | 1,749 | 6.0 | 75 | 9 | **18** | 55.7 | 38 | **302** | **7.9** | **25** | 0 | 19 | 155 | 6 | 1 |
| 1990 | DAL | 15 | 15 | 7−8 | 226 | 399 | 56.6 | 2,579 | 6.5 | 61 | 11 | **18** | 66.6 | **40** | 172 | 4.3 | 20 | 1 | **39** | **288** | 5 | 0 |
| 1991 | DAL | 12 | 12 | 7−5 | 237 | 363 | 65.3 | 2,754 | 7.6 | 61 | 11 | 10 | 86.7 | 16 | 5 | 0.3 | 9 | 1 | 32 | 224 | 4 | 2 |
| 1992 | DAL | 16 | 16 | **13−3** | **302** | 473 | 63.8 | **3,445** | 7.3 | 87 | **23** | 14 | 89.5 | 37 | 105 | 2.8 | 19 | 1 | 23 | 112 | 4 | 0 |
| 1993 | DAL | 14 | 14 | 11−3 | 271 | 392 | **69.1** | 3,100 | **7.9** | 80 | 15 | 6 | **99.0** | 32 | 125 | 3.9 | 20 | 0 | 26 | 153 | 7 | 3 |
| 1994 | DAL | 14 | 14 | 10−4 | 233 | 361 | 64.5 | 2,676 | 7.4 | **90** | 13 | 12 | 84.9 | 30 | 62 | 2.1 | 13 | 1 | 14 | 59 | 2 | 2 |
| 1995 | DAL | 16 | 16 | 12−4 | 280 | 432 | 64.8 | 3,304 | 7.6 | 50 | 16 | 7 | 93.6 | 21 | 32 | 1.5 | 12 | 1 | 14 | 89 | 5 | 2 |
| 1996 | DAL | 15 | 15 | 10−5 | 296 | 465 | 63.7 | 3,126 | 6.7 | 61 | 12 | 13 | 80.1 | 35 | 42 | 1.2 | 10 | 1 | 18 | 120 | 6 | **6** |
| 1997 | DAL | 16 | 16 | 6−10 | 292 | **518** | 56.4 | 3,283 | 6.3 | 64 | 19 | 12 | 78.0 | 25 | 79 | 3.2 | 13 | 0 | 33 | 269 | 6 | 4 |
| 1998 | DAL | 11 | 11 | 7−4 | 187 | 315 | 59.4 | 2,330 | 7.4 | 67 | 12 | 5 | 88.5 | 22 | 69 | 3.1 | 23 | **2** | 9 | 58 | 3 | 1 |
| 1999 | DAL | 14 | 14 | 7−7 | 263 | 442 | 59.5 | 2,964 | 6.7 | **90** | 17 | 12 | 81.1 | 21 | 10 | 0.5 | 7 | 1 | 19 | 130 | **8** | 2 |
| 2000 | DAL | 11 | 11 | 4−7 | 156 | 262 | 59.5 | 1,632 | 6.2 | 48 | 7 | 14 | 64.3 | 10 | 13 | 1.3 | 5 | 0 | 13 | 91 | 2 | 2 |
| Career | | 165 | 165 | 94−71 | 2,898 | 4,715 | 61.5 | 32,942 | 7.0 | 90 | 165 | 141 | 81.6 | 327 | 1,016 | 3.1 | 25 | 9 | 259 | 1,748 | 58 | 25 |

==== Postseason ====
| Year | Team | Games | | | Passing | | | | | | | | | Rushing | | | | | Sacked | | Fumbles | |
| Year | Team | GP | GS | Record | Cmp | Att | Pct | Yds | Y/A | Lng | TD | Int | Rtg | Att | Yds | Y/A | Lng | TD | Sck | SckY | Fum | Lost |
|---|---|---|---|---|---|---|---|---|---|---|---|---|---|---|---|---|---|---|---|---|---|---|
| 1991 | DAL | 1 | 0 | — | 11 | 16 | 68.8 | 114 | 7.1 | 25 | 0 | 1 | 63.0 | 2 | 0 | 0.0 | 0 | 0 | 3 | 26 | **2** | **2** |
| 1992 | DAL | 3 | 3 | **3−0** | **61** | **89** | 68.5 | **795** | 8.9 | 70 | **8** | 0 | **126.4** | **9** | **38** | 4.2 | **19** | 0 | **7** | **43** | 1 | 0 |
| 1993 | DAL | 3 | 3 | **3−0** | **61** | 82 | **74.4** | 686 | 8.4 | 35 | 5 | 3 | 104.0 | 7 | 28 | 4.0 | 12 | 0 | **7** | 28 | 0 | 0 |
| 1994 | DAL | 2 | 2 | 1−1 | 53 | 83 | 63.9 | 717 | 8.6 | **94** | 4 | **4** | 87.3 | 2 | 11 | **5.5** | 9 | 0 | 5 | 35 | 0 | 0 |
| 1995 | DAL | 3 | 3 | **3−0** | 53 | 80 | 66.3 | 717 | **9.0** | 47 | 4 | 1 | 106.1 | 8 | 6 | 0.8 | 9 | 0 | 4 | 25 | 0 | 0 |
| 1996 | DAL | 2 | 2 | 1−1 | 37 | 65 | 56.9 | 343 | 5.3 | 23 | 1 | **4** | 51.0 | 3 | 4 | 1.3 | 2 | **1** | 3 | 26 | 1 | 0 |
| 1998 | DAL | 1 | 1 | 0−1 | 22 | 49 | 44.9 | 191 | 3.9 | 19 | 1 | 3 | 37.0 | 1 | 0 | 0.0 | 0 | 0 | 4 | 27 | 1 | 0 |
| 1999 | DAL | 1 | 1 | 0−1 | 22 | 38 | 57.9 | 286 | 7.5 | 45 | 0 | 1 | 70.7 | 0 | 0 | — | 0 | 0 | 1 | 8 | 0 | 0 |
| Career | | 16 | 15 | 11−4 | 320 | 502 | 63.7 | 3,849 | 7.7 | 94 | 23 | 17 | 88.3 | 32 | 87 | 2.7 | 19 | 1 | 34 | 218 | 5 | 2 |

==== Super Bowl ====
| Year | SB | Team | Opp. | Passing | | | | | | | | Rushing | | | | Result |
| Year | SB | Team | Opp. | Cmp | Att | Pct | Yds | Y/A | TD | Int | Rtg | Att | Yds | Y/A | TD | Result |
|---|---|---|---|---|---|---|---|---|---|---|---|---|---|---|---|---|
| 1992 | XXVII | DAL | BUF | **22** | **30** | **73.3** | **273** | **9.1** | **4** | 0 | **140.7** | 3 | **28** | **9.3** | 0 | **W** 52–17 |
| 1993 | XXVIII | DAL | BUF | 19 | 27 | 70.4 | 207 | 7.7 | 0 | **1** | 77.2 | 1 | 2 | 3.0 | 0 | **W** 30–13 |
| 1995 | XXX | DAL | PIT | 15 | 23 | 65.2 | 207 | **9.1** | 1 | 0 | 108.8 | **4** | -3 | -0.8 | 0 | **W** 27–17 |
| Career | | | | 56 | 80 | 70.0 | 689 | 8.6 | 5 | 1 | 111.9 | 8 | 28 | 3.5 | 0 | W−L 3–0 |

=== College ===
| Year | Team | Games | | | Passing | | | | | | | | Rushing | | | |
| Year | Team | GP | GS | Record | Cmp | Att | Pct | Yds | Y/A | TD | Int | Rtg | Att | Yds | Avg | TD |
|---|---|---|---|---|---|---|---|---|---|---|---|---|---|---|---|---|
| 1984 | Oklahoma | ? (Note: Aikman’s games played in the 1984 season are currently unknown.) | 1 | 0–1 | 6 | 20 | 30.0 | 41 | 2.1 | 0 | 3 | 17.2 | 12 | 18 | 1.5 | 1 |
| 1985 | Oklahoma | 4 | 4 | 3–1 | 27 | 47 | 57.4 | 442 | 9.4 | 1 | 1 | 139.2 | 49 | 93 | 1.9 | 0 |
| 1986 | UCLA | Did not play due to NCAA transfer rules | | | | | | | | | | | | | | |
| 1987 | UCLA | 12 | 12 | 10–2 | 178 | 273 | 65.2 | 2,527 | 9.3 | 17 | 8 | 157.6 | 79 | −87 | −1.1 | 2 |
| 1988 | UCLA | 12 | 12 | 10–2 | 228 | 354 | 64.4 | 2,771 | 7.8 | 24 | 9 | 147.4 | 78 | 83 | 1.1 | 1 |
| Career | | 29 | 29 | 23–6 | 439 | 694 | 63.3 | 5,781 | 8.3 | 42 | 21 | 142.3 | 218 | 107 | 0.5 | 4 |

== Post-retirement activities ==
After he retired from professional football as a player, Aikman joined Fox's NFC telecasts as a color commentator for the 2001 season. A year later, he was named to Fox's lead announcing crew, teaming up with Joe Buck and (from 2002 to 2004) Cris Collinsworth. Aikman received an Emmy Award nomination for his television work in 2004 and has broadcast six Super Bowls (XXXIX, XLII, XLV, XLVIII, LI, and LIV) to date. It was revealed in 2016 that in 2004, Aikman nearly came out of retirement to sign a one-year deal with the Miami Dolphins, but the Dolphins ended up not signing him.

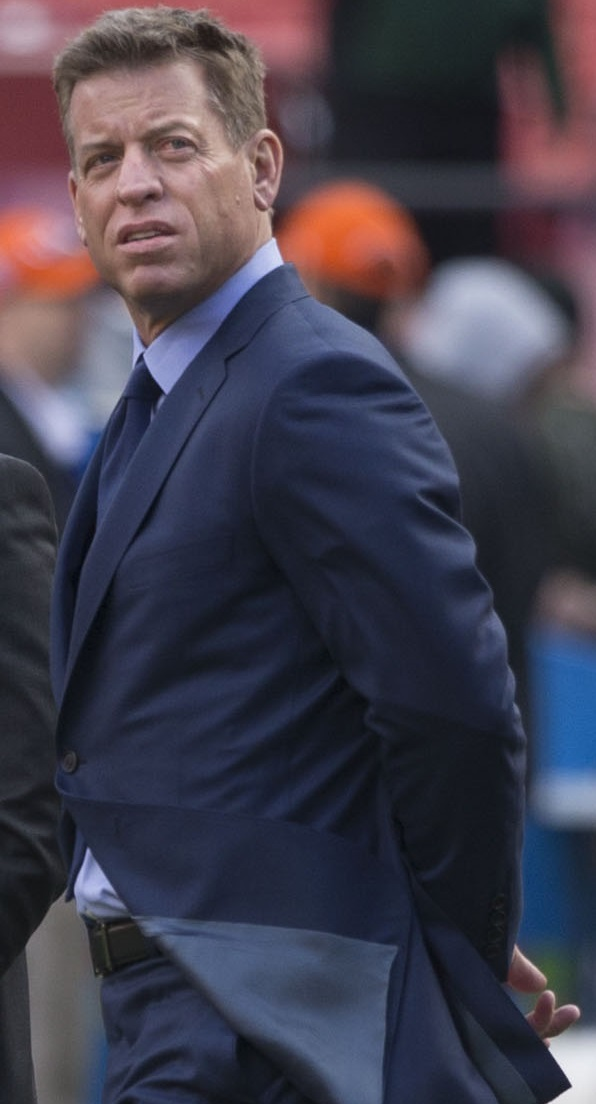
Aikman in 2016

Aikman also hosts a weekly sports radio show which airs on Thursday from 7 to 8 p.m. ET on Sporting News Radio and appears weekly during the football season on the Dunham & Miller morning show on Dallas sports talk radio station 1310 The Ticket. He was a public spokesman for Acme Brick throughout his career. He is also the chairman of the Troy Aikman Foundation, a charity to benefit children that has recently focused on building playplaces for children's hospitals. In 2016, Aikman merged his foundation with the United Way Foundation of Metropolitan Dallas and donated $1 million to United Way in the process. The Agency Sports Management & Marketing handles Aikman's marketing activities, where Jordan Bazant is his lead agent.

Aikman was ranked No. 95 on The Sporting News' list of the 100 Greatest Football Players in 1999, and has been the official Wingstop spokesman for several years. He appeared in The Simpsons episode "Sunday, Cruddy Sunday" alongside former Miami Dolphins quarterback Dan Marino. He also participated in the 2001 and 2011 videos honoring Billy Graham's 83rd and 93rd birthdays. Aikman said he was going to appear on Dancing with the Stars in front of TMZ cameras. However, he revealed he was only joking about it and won't appear on the show.

On September 19, 2005, at halftime of the Dallas Cowboys-Washington Redskins game (broadcast on Monday Night Football), Aikman was inducted into the Dallas Cowboys Ring of Honor with his longtime teammates Michael Irvin and Emmitt Smith. On August 5, 2006, Aikman was one of six players inducted into the Pro Football Hall of Fame.

At another halftime ceremony, on February 7, 2009, at the UCLA-Notre Dame basketball game, Aikman's induction into the College Hall of Fame was honored. Aikman announced he had completed coursework to finish his degree in sociology. He participated in UCLA's 2009 Sociology Department commencement ceremony with quarterback Kevin Craft and linebacker Marcus Reese, who also came back to finish his college education. Former UCLA quarterback John Sciarra was the keynote speaker at the ceremony.

On February 9, 2010, Aikman became a member of the National Football Foundation Board of Directors.

As of fall 2010, Aikman is a co-spokesman for Rent-a-Center, along with Hulk Hogan.

In the fall of 2011, Aikman joined the Oxford Preparatory Academy Charter School Advisory Board in Southern California.

In November 2013, Aikman was named a 2014 recipient of the NCAA Silver Anniversary Award, given annually to six former college athletes 25 years after the end of their college athletics careers.

In March 2014, Aikman was announced as a partner and spokesman for IDLife.

After 20 seasons as Fox's lead broadcast team, ESPN announced on March 16, 2022, that both Buck and Aikman would join ESPN as the new lead commentators of Monday Night Football.

In January 2026, Aikman was hired by the Miami Dolphins as a consultant to search for their next general manager and head coach.

=== Hall of Fame Racing ===
In late 2005, Aikman, along with former Cowboys quarterback Roger Staubach, established a NASCAR team called Hall of Fame Racing, fielding the No. 96 car (derived by multiplying Aikman's jersey number as a Dallas Cowboy by Staubach's) shared between Terry Labonte and Tony Raines during the 2006 NASCAR Nextel Cup Series. Raines drove for Hall of Fame full-time in 2007, and J. J. Yeley and Brad Coleman drove the car in 2008. The team closed after the 2009 season.

=== Troy Aikman Enterprises ===
Aikman has owned several car dealerships in the Dallas–Fort Worth area and launched a light beer brand called Eight in 2022. He also owns a restaurant called Troy's at Texas Live.

== Personal life ==
Aikman was once named the most eligible bachelor in Dallas by Texas Monthly and dated country singer Lorrie Morgan.

He married former Cowboys publicist Rhonda Worthey on April 8, 2000 in Plano, Texas. They have two daughters and Worthey has another daughter named Rachel from a previous marriage. The couple announced their separation on January 24, 2011, and their divorce was finalized on April 12, 2011.

On June 2, 2017, Aikman announced his engagement to high-end fashion retailer Catherine "Capa" Mooty on Instagram. Mooty has two sons with her ex-husband, lawyer Jerry Mooty, who is the nephew of Cowboys owner Jerry Jones. On September 1, 2017, Aikman and Catherine Mooty married at the Biltmore Four Seasons in Montecito, California. It was revealed in July 2023 that Aikman and Mooty were officially divorced.

Aikman resides in Dallas.

== See also ==
- Troy Aikman NFL Football, a 1994 video game
