= Leonard Conley =

American football player (born 1968)

Profile
- Position: Running back / Wide receiver / Linebacker

Personal information
- Born: October 16, 1968 (age 58); Tarpon Springs, Florida, U.S.
- Listed height: 5 ft 8 in (1.73 m)
- Listed weight: 190 lb (86 kg)

Career information
- College: Miami

Career history
- London Monarchs (1992); Miami Hooters (1993–1994); Iowa Barnstormers (1995–2000); New York Dragons (2001)

Awards and highlights
- 2× National champion (1987, 1989)

Career AFL statistics
- Receptions: 382
- Yards: 4,208
- Touchdowns: 67
- Stats at ArenaFan.com

Leonard Conley (born October 16, 1968) is an American former football wide receiver and linebacker in the Arena Football League. He played college football at Miami.

Conley was a member of the 1987 and 1989 Miami Hurricanes National Championship team.
