= Jimmy Johnson (American football coach) =

American football broadcaster, coach and executive (born 1943)

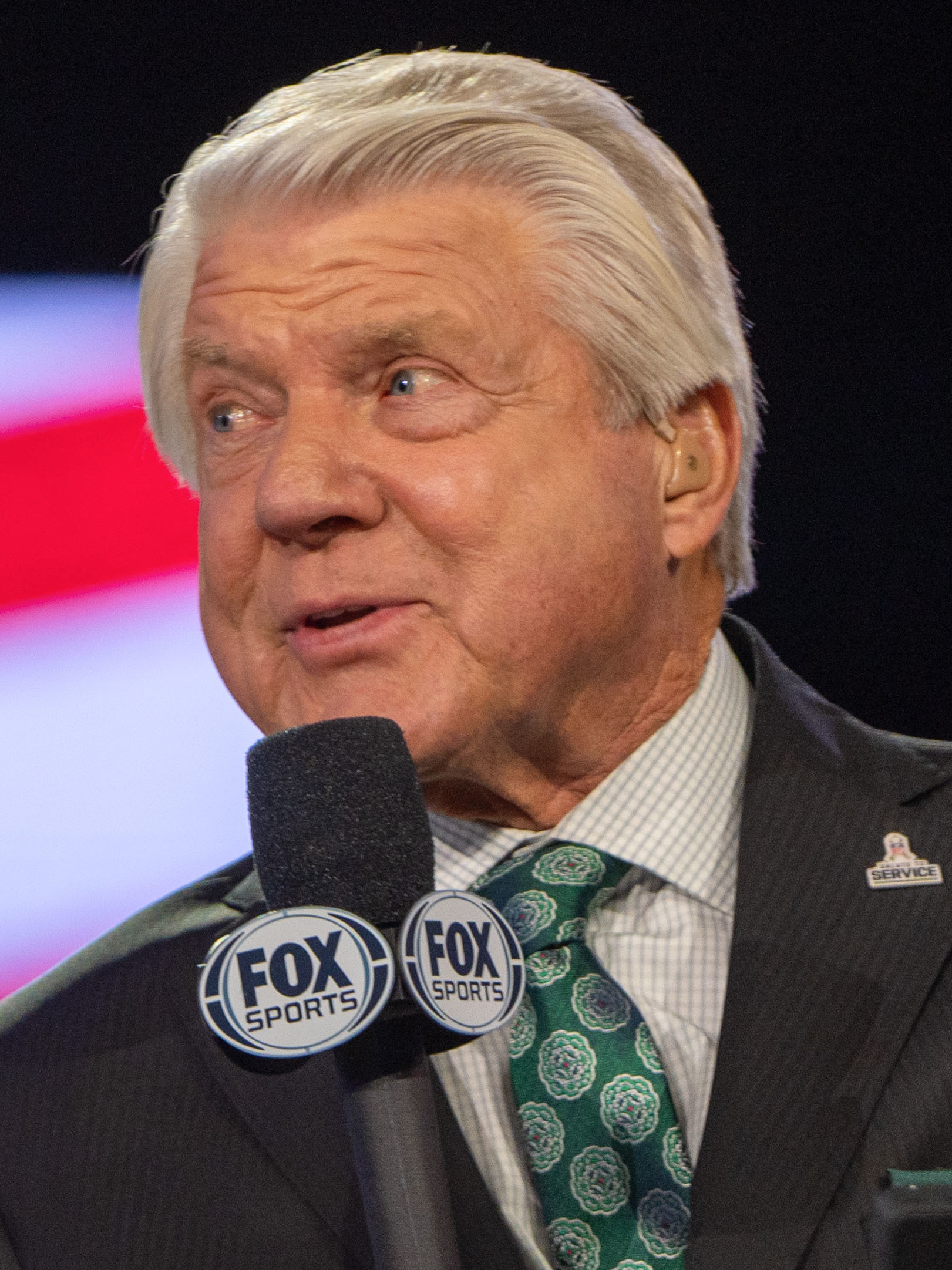
- Johnson in 2022

Personal information
- Born: July 16, 1943 (age 83); Port Arthur, Texas, U.S.

Career information
- High school: Thomas Jefferson (Port Arthur)
- College: Arkansas
- NFL draft: 1965: undrafted

Career history

Coaching
- Louisiana Tech (1965) Assistant coach; Picayune Memorial HS (MS) (1966) Assistant coach; Wichita State (1967) Assistant coach; Iowa State (1968–1969) Assistant coach; Oklahoma (1970–1972) Defensive line coach; Arkansas (1973–1976) Defensive coordinator; Pittsburgh (1977–1978) Assistant head coach/defensive coordinator; Oklahoma State (1979–1983) Head coach; Miami (FL) (1984–1988) Head coach; Dallas Cowboys (1989–1993) Head coach; Miami Dolphins (1996–1999) Head coach

Operations
- Dallas Cowboys (1989–1993) General manager; Miami Dolphins (1996–1999) General manager

Awards and highlights
- Playing: National champion (1964); 2× SWC champion (1961, 1964); First-team All-SWC (1964); Coaching: 2× Super Bowl champion (XXVII, XXVIII); National champion (1987); AP NFL Coach of the Year (1990); Dallas Cowboys Ring of Honor; Walter Camp Coach of the Year (1986); Big Eight Coach of the Year (1979)

Head coaching record
- Regular season: NFL: 80–64 (.556); NCAA: 78–30–3 (.716)
- Postseason: NFL: 9–4 (.692); NCAA: 3–4 (.429)
- Career: NFL: 89–68 (.567); NCAA: 81–34–3 (.699)
- Coaching profile at Pro Football Reference
- Pro Football Hall of Fame
- College Football Hall of Fame

James William Johnson (born July 16, 1943) is an American former football coach and sports analyst. Johnson served as a head football coach at the college level for 10 seasons and in the National Football League (NFL) for nine seasons. He is the first head football coach to win both a college football national championship and a Super Bowl, achieving the former with the Miami Hurricanes and the latter with the Dallas Cowboys.

Johnson held his first head football coaching position with the Oklahoma State Cowboys from 1979 to 1983. He became Miami's head football coach in 1984 and guided the team to victory in the 1988 Orange Bowl. Following the college championship, Johnson succeeded original Cowboys head coach Tom Landry in 1989, a position that saw him help rebuild the team back to winning form. His tenure from 1989 to 1993 culminated with the Cowboys winning consecutive Super Bowl titles in Super Bowl XXVII and Super Bowl XXVIII, both over the Buffalo Bills. Johnson left Dallas after the second championship amid conflict with owner Jerry Jones.

Following two years away from football, Johnson returned in 1996 to become the head coach of the Miami Dolphins, where he served until retiring after the 1999 season. After his coaching retirement, Johnson appeared as an analyst for Fox Sports and was one of the featured commentators of Fox NFL Sunday until his retirement following the 2024 season. He was inducted to the College Football Hall of Fame in 2012 and the Pro Football Hall of Fame in 2020.

== Early life ==
Johnson attended high school at Thomas Jefferson High School, now Memorial High School, in Port Arthur, Texas. He was a classmate of singer Janis Joplin.

Johnson played college football as a defensive lineman at the University of Arkansas between 1962 and 1964 while majoring in psychology, as he initially planned to work as an industrial psychologist. One of his teammates was Jerry Jones, a future businessman and owner of the Dallas Cowboys. Johnson helped lead the Razorbacks to the national championship in 1964 when he was named to the All-Southwest Conference team. It was during his playing days that Johnson got roped into coaching. When the Razorback coaching staff would play host to small college and high school coaches in "miniclinics", Johnson was often sent to do lectures because of his thorough comprehension of the defensive scheme, and it was during one visit in 1965 by Louisiana Tech that had them interested in him.

In later years, Johnson was named to the Razorbacks All-Decade team of the 1960s and was later inducted into Arkansas's athletic hall of fame in 1988, followed by the university's hall of fame in 1999.

== Coaching career ==
=== Early coaching jobs ===
Johnson began as an assistant coach at Louisiana Tech University in 1965. During this time, Phil Robertson of Duck Dynasty fame was the starting quarterback, and Johnson helped recruit high school quarterback Terry Bradshaw from nearby Shreveport. He then became an assistant coach at Picayune Memorial High School in Picayune, Mississippi, in 1966. In 1967, Johnson was an assistant at Wichita State University, then in 1968 and 1969, he served under Johnny Majors at Iowa State University in Ames. In 1970, Johnson moved on to another Big Eight Conference school, to become a defensive line coach at the University of Oklahoma, working under head coach Chuck Fairbanks and alongside future rivals Barry Switzer and Jim Dickey.

In 1973, Johnson returned to Arkansas, where he served as the defensive coordinator during the 1976 season. There, he coached such players as Brison Manor and Dirt Winston. Johnson had hopes of being named head coach when Broyles retired, but was passed over for Lou Holtz. Holtz wanted to retain Johnson on his staff and offered him a position, but Johnson decided to move on.

Johnson became assistant head coach and defensive coordinator at the University of Pittsburgh under Jackie Sherrill in 1977 and 1978. There, he coached Randy Holloway, David Logan, Al Chesley, J. C. Wilson, Rickey Jackson, Jimbo Covert, and Hugh Green, and was introduced to Pitt alumnus and assistant coach Dave Wannstedt, who later teamed up with Johnson again at the University of Miami, Oklahoma State, the Cowboys, and the Dolphins.

=== Oklahoma State ===
In 1979, Johnson got his first head coaching job, at Oklahoma State University. Johnson coached the Cowboys for five seasons from 1979 to 1983. His tenure there is noteworthy for his successful rebuilding of an inconsistent program. In his final season, he led the Cowboys to an 8–4 record and a 24–14 victory over 20th-ranked Baylor Bears in the Astro-Bluebonnet Bowl.

In 1984, when he was offered the head coaching job at the University of Miami, Johnson was unsure if he wanted to leave Stillwater. His good friend Larry Lacewell told Johnson that if he wanted to win a national championship and eventually coach in the NFL, he had to take the Miami job. Johnson soon after accepted the head coaching job at Miami.

Before taking the Miami job, Johnson interviewed for the head coaching job at Arkansas when Lou Holtz left following the 1983 season. Johnson later found out that Ken Hatfield had already been hired. Upset that Frank Broyles (who by this time was the Arkansas athletic director) made no mention of this during the interview, Johnson distanced himself from his alma mater. As payback for the snub, a home-and-home series was scheduled between Miami and Arkansas. In 1987, Miami gave Arkansas its worst home loss ever at the time, 51–7.

=== University of Miami ===
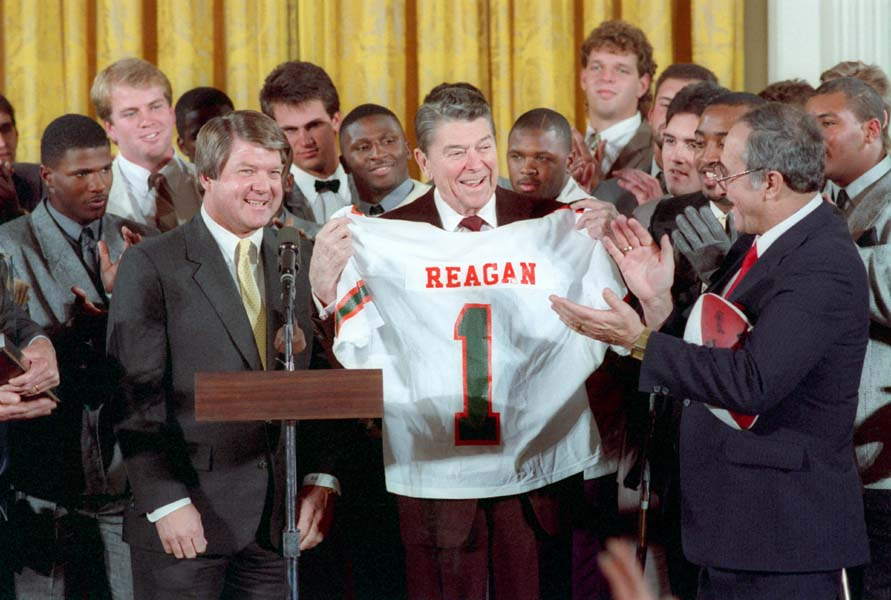
Jimmy Johnson and the 1987 Miami Hurricanes team present President Ronald Reagan with a University of Miami jersey at The White House after winning the 1987 national championship, January 1988

In 1984, Johnson was hired by the University of Miami to replace former coach Howard Schnellenberger, who had won Miami's first national championship in 1983 and departed for the recently formed USFL. Johnson's hiring was met with an initial response of "Jimmy who?" by the fans and media. Johnson started with a shaky 8–5 record his first season, which included a game in which Johnson's Hurricanes blew a 31–0 halftime lead in a loss to Maryland with Frank Reich as its QB, and also included a 47–45 loss to Boston College immortalized by Doug Flutie's "Hail Mary" touchdown pass on the game's final play. But Johnson developed the Hurricanes into a football program that came to be known as "the Decade of Dominance". In his five years at Miami, Johnson compiled a 52–9 record, appeared in five New Year's Day bowl games, winning one national championship (1987) and losing one to the Penn State Nittany Lions (1986).

Johnson created a free-wheeling atmosphere where he allowed, and at times encouraged, his players to showboat, trash-talk, and run up the score. He also brought the modern 4–3 defense predicated on athletic upfield linemen to the forefront. The criticism they received from other teams caused the media to deem them the "Bad Boys of College Football", a moniker Johnson openly accepted.

Johnson's Hurricanes posted the school's first undefeated regular season in 1986, only to lose the Fiesta Bowl and the national championship to #2-ranked Penn State. The loss, along with losses in Miami's prior two bowl games, began to raise questions about whether Johnson was capable of winning major games. In the ensuing 1987 season, however, the Hurricanes went undefeated in the regular season yet again, and won the school's second national title by defeating Barry Switzer's Oklahoma Sooners for the third season in a row.

Johnson also created controversy by allowing the University of Miami to retire Vinny Testaverde's football jersey number #14, but refusing to retire Bernie Kosar's number #20, though Kosar played one season for Johnson and led the Hurricanes to the national title the season before Johnson became head coach. Johnson's reason for not retiring Kosar's number was, "Bernie didn't finish the program here (at Miami)." Kosar graduated with honors, a year ahead of his freshman class in 1985, with a dual major in finance and economics and subsequently entered the NFL's supplemental draft. Testaverde won the school's first Heisman Trophy in December 1986 and was the first player selected in the 1987 NFL draft. However, as the Cowboys head coach, Johnson later reached out and signed Kosar as a backup QB after Kosar was released by the Cleveland Browns during the 1993 NFL season. Kosar played during the Cowboys' Super Bowl run that season while starter Troy Aikman was injured, clinching the NFC Championship game and earning a Super Bowl ring.

Johnson was inducted into the University of Miami Sports Hall of Fame in 1996 and the College Football Hall of Fame in 2012.

=== Dallas Cowboys ===
In 1989, Jerry Jones, the new owner of the National Football League's Dallas Cowboys, a long-time friend and former University of Arkansas teammate of Johnson's, asked him to become the second head coach in franchise history, replacing Tom Landry, who had coached the team since its beginning in 1960. Johnson was reunited with former Miami standout Michael Irvin, and in Johnson's first season as coach, the 1989 Cowboys went 1–15. Johnson, however, did not take long to develop the Cowboys into a championship-quality team. Johnson had an ability to find talent in the draft, make savvy trades (namely, the trade of Herschel Walker, which yielded six high draft picks and a number of players from the Minnesota Vikings), and by signing quality players such as Jay Novacek as free agents in the age before the NFL had imposed a salary cap.

Johnson served as head coach of the Cowboys from 1989 through 1993. He is one of only seven men in NFL history (including Vince Lombardi, Don Shula, Chuck Noll, Mike Shanahan, Bill Belichick, and Andy Reid) to coach consecutive Super Bowl winners, winning Super Bowl XXVII in 1992 and Super Bowl XXVIII in 1993 (his team beat the Buffalo Bills in both Super Bowls). Johnson led the Cowboys to a record of 10–1 in the regular season during the month of December from 1991 to 1993, also leading to a playoff record of 7–1 in those years. Johnson also had a record of 24–1 when running back Emmitt Smith ran for 100 yards or more in a regular-season game, and 5–0 in the postseason, winning two Super Bowls.

Jimmy Johnson and Jerry Jones mutually agreed to split due largely to their growing inability to work together. Although Jones had the title of general manager, he had largely delegated control over on-field matters to Johnson. By 1993, however, Jones wanted more authority over the football side of the operation, but Johnson was unwilling to relinquish it. An incident happened in December 1993 when the Cowboys were getting ready to play the Giants for the NFC East title, where Johnson had said he was interested in becoming head coach of the expansion Jacksonville Jaguars. This led to Jones telling the media that he alone would decide Johnson's coaching future. In March 1994, after the Cowboys had won their second Super Bowl under Johnson, Jones angered Johnson when he told reporters that any coach could have led the Cowboys to a Super Bowl. They agreed to part ways on March 28, 1994, with Johnson getting a $2 million bonus.

Jones then hired another former Arkansas player, former Oklahoma Sooners head coach Barry Switzer, and the Cowboys won Super Bowl XXX two seasons after Johnson's departure. Notable members on the winning team included Johnson holdovers Troy Aikman, Emmitt Smith, Michael Irvin, and Super Bowl XXX MVP Larry Brown. However, the Cowboys went into decline after Super Bowl XXX and have not reached the NFC Championship Game since.

Johnson was not included in the Dallas Cowboys Ring of Honor for many years. When asked in the summer of 2014 why Johnson was not in the Ring of Honor despite his two Super Bowl victories as coach of the Cowboys, Jones stated: "Disloyalty ... I couldn't handle the disloyalty." The Cowboys Ring of Honor has been viewed as the "gatekeeper to the Pro Football Hall of Fame" for Dallas players, coaches, and executives; despite this snub, it was announced in 2020 that Johnson would be inducted into the Pro Football Hall of Fame.

Johnson and Jones had appeared to patch up their relationship, such as appearing together on the 25th anniversary of the Cowboys' Super Bowl XXVII win and Johnson congratulating Jones on his Hall of Fame induction in 2017. On August 5, 2021, during the 2021 Hall of Fame Game broadcast on Fox, Jones announced that Johnson would be inducted in the Dallas Cowboys Ring of Honor. The ceremony took place during the Cowboys' matchup against the Detroit Lions on December 30, 2023.

=== Miami Dolphins ===
After working as a television analyst with Fox Sports for two years and briefly flirting with an offer for the head coaching job of the Philadelphia Eagles in 1994, Johnson joined the Miami Dolphins in 1996, replacing head coach Don Shula, who retired at the end of the 1995 season. After a below-expectations year for the Dolphins in 1995, capped off by a blowout loss in the playoffs versus the Buffalo Bills, there was a groundswell among Dolphins fans who wanted Shula to step aside in favor of Johnson.

Johnson's tenure in Miami did not live up to expectations. Johnson won fewer games in his first season than Shula had in his final season (8–8 vs. 9–7). Johnson's overall winning percentage at Miami was 55.3% vs. 65.8% for Shula. Brian Billick related a story about Johnson in 2019 when each were broadcasters, with the latter stating his advice of not to go back into coaching unless one had the passion and proper reasons to do so, since plenty of coaches went back without those reasons. As related by Billick of what Johnson said, "I was one of them. I went back for the wrong reasons. If you go back for ego, if you go back for money, it's the wrong reason."

Johnson inherited one of the NFL's best offenses, led by Hall of Fame quarterback Dan Marino; the defense was considered mediocre, though it was ranked 10th in fewest points allowed in 1995. As a defensive specialist, Johnson expected to put together a championship defense. With complete control over personnel decisions, Johnson and his staff signed several excellent defensive players, drafting future Hall of Famers Jason Taylor and Zach Thomas, and Pro Bowlers Sam Madison, and Patrick Surtain. But Johnson's draft record was blemished by several disappointments, including fifth-round pick running back Cecil Collins, and two first-round picks, running back John Avery and wide receiver Yatil Green. The Dolphins finished 8–8 in 1996 and then 9–7 in 1997, losing to the New England Patriots in the wild card round. In 1998, the Dolphins finished 10–6 with the league's best defense, defeated the Buffalo Bills in the wild card round, then were crushed 38–3 by the Denver Broncos in the divisional round.

In a 1996 interview, Johnson said he did not feel he could ever reach the stature of Shula or Landry, simply because he did not feel able to stay with the job as long as they had: "26 years or so as a head coach. I don't think I'll make it that long. This is my sixth year as a head coach, and whenever this contract's done, I think I'll probably be done coaching."

Johnson (right) poses for a photo during the Dolphin's 1999 training camp with player O. J. McDuffie and Miami-Dade County Mayor Alex Penelas

In January 1999, Johnson resigned as Dolphins head coach, citing burnout. He reversed his decision in one day, after Marino—with whom Johnson had a strained relationship—pleaded with Johnson to come back. Dolphins owner Wayne Huizenga also hired the recently fired Chicago Bears head coach Dave Wannstedt, a former assistant under Johnson both at the University of Miami and at Dallas, as defensive coordinator/assistant head coach.

In the face of Super Bowl expectations, the Dolphins won four of their first five games, with the loss to Buffalo on Monday Night Football leaving Johnson to criticize Marino publicly for his play. Marino suffered a bone spur in his back that knocked him out until Thanksgiving, leaving the team in the hands of rookie Damon Huard. By the halfway point, the Dolphins were 7–1, with Huard losing only once as a starter. When Marino returned with the team at 8–2, he threw five interceptions against Dallas in what became a harbinger for the rest of the stretch, which saw Miami lose five of their last six games on their way to a 9–7 record while the relationship between Marino and Johnson saw Johnson described as "vaguely critical" of Marino in public. Due to a loss by Kansas City, Miami made it to the playoffs and faced the Seattle Seahawks in the wild card round of the playoffs. Playing in Seattle, the Dolphins rallied late 20–17 to win their first road playoff game since 1972. However, in the divisional round, they were crushed in an embarrassing 62–7 loss to the Jacksonville Jaguars where they trailed by 34 at halftime. Johnson resigned the day after the game and Marino soon thereafter announced his retirement. Johnson was succeeded by Wannstedt.

In a 2021 interview, Johnson revealed that the Dolphins could have traded for Peyton Manning in the 1998 NFL draft, theoretically offering the Colts their entire draft board in exchange for the first overall pick. Johnson declined to give more details to this trade, with him stating, "I probably gave you too much already." Johnson stated later that one of his biggest disappointments was not having a "healthy Dan Marino", as Marino had ailing knees and a previously torn Achilles to go with a bad shoulder in their final season together.

== Television career ==
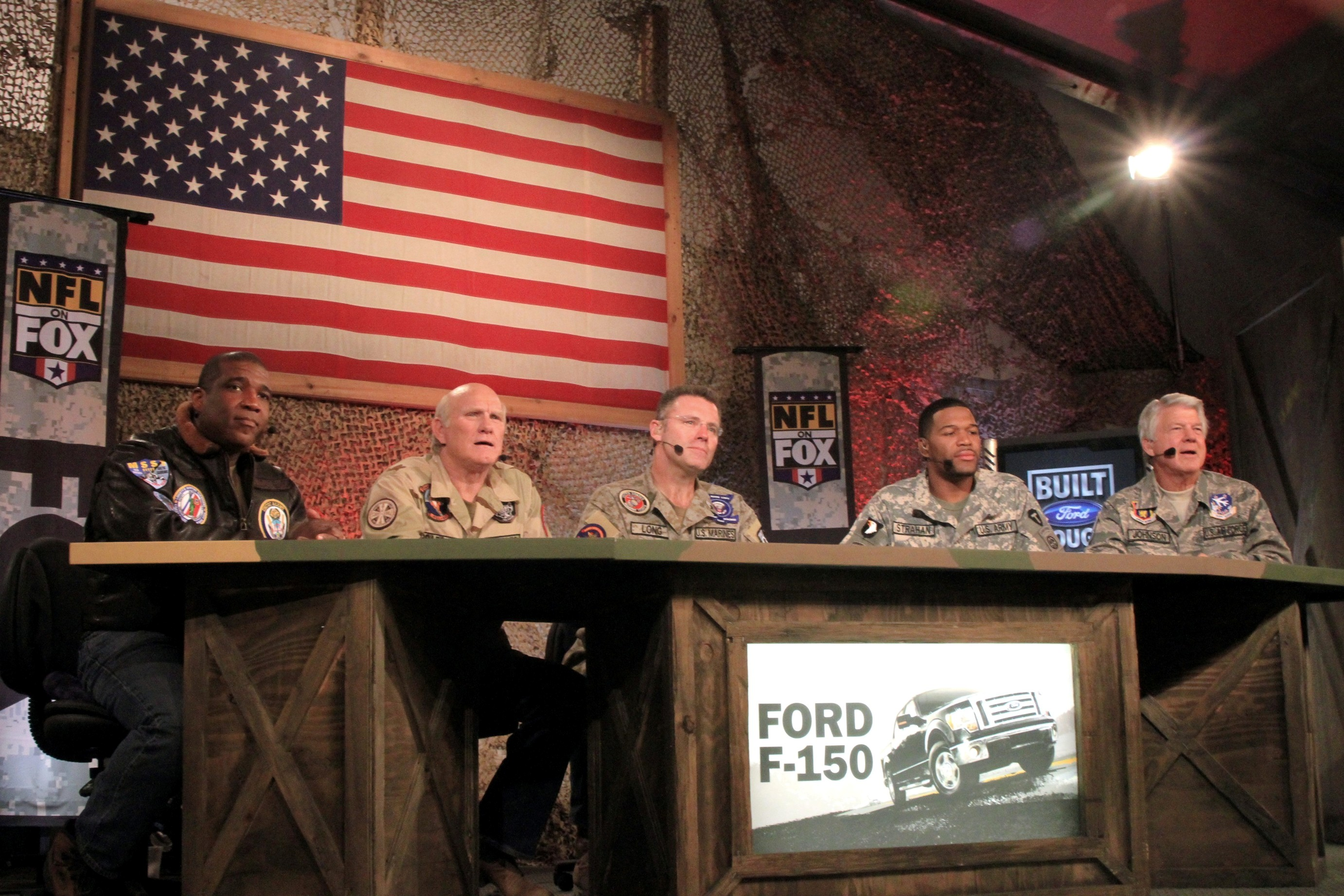
Curt Menefee, Terry Bradshaw, Howie Long, Michael Strahan, and Jimmy Johnson in Afghanistan during a taping of the FOX NFL Sunday pregame show, 2009

After leaving the Dolphins, Johnson became a television studio analyst again for Fox Sports and Fox NFL Sunday. He has been assigned as a studio analyst for Fox's coverage of the Bowl Championship Series in January with Chris Rose as the host, and also pens a column on Foxsports.com. In addition he has made several guest or cameo appearances in film and television: as a bearded prisoner in lockup on the television series The Shield, as a guest star in the episode, "Johnsonwreckers" on Coach in 1994, and a cameo in the movie The Waterboy, next to Bill Cowher.

In March 2025, Johnson announced his retirement from sports broadcasting.

=== Commercials ===
Johnson endorsements include Procter & Gamble, and a series of commercials for the male enhancement pill ExtenZe in 2010. He was also involved in a South Florida-based scam called The Leading Edge that purported to feature businesses on an "educational" "interstitial" program by that name that would air on public television. Johnson filmed the TV spots in the style of an infomercial and businesses were pitched on the program using these clips, which appeared on the website. They were charged an "underwriting fee" of over $20,000 to appear on the show, however, the show never actually aired. They were not affiliated with PBS and there is no record of any air dates.

=== Survivor ===
Johnson was one of 20 castaways competing in Survivor: Nicaragua, the 21st edition of Survivor, in late 2010. He is a long-time fan of the show, and had been cast for Survivor: Gabon, which was the 17th edition of the show, but had to withdraw after failing a physical. Johnson, the oldest contestant of the season, was part of the Espada tribe, made up entirely of people aged 40 or older. He was voted out 8–1 on Day Eight of the competition, becoming the third person voted out of the game and finishing 18th overall. As he left the game, he said to his tribe, "One of you, win a million bucks, okay?" However, the season was won by a member of the opposing La Flor tribe. He also said, "I had fun, but I was miserable the whole time. I still love the game, it's been a great adventure, but this is the most stressful time I've ever gone through in my life. And that includes Super Bowls and collegiate national championships. I initially said, 'Keep your strongest members.' I obviously wasn't one of them."

== Pro Football Hall of Fame Induction ==
Johnson was surprised during a telecast of Fox NFL Sunday by Pro Football Hall of Fame President David Baker on January 12, 2020, announcing that he would be the 328th member of the Pro Football Hall of Fame in Canton, Ohio. He personally thanked his coworkers on Fox NFL Sunday, and thanked his players and assistant coaches for their contributions. Following numerous delays due to the COVID-19 pandemic, Johnson was formally inducted on August 7, 2021.

== Awards and honors ==
NFL

- Two-time Super Bowl champion (XXVII, XXVIII - as head coach of the Dallas Cowboys)
- 1990 AP NFL Coach of the Year

NCAA

- Two-time National champion
  - 1964 as a player with the Arkansas Razorbacks (FWAA)
  - 1987 as head coach of the Miami Hurricanes
- 1986 Walter Camp Coach of the Year

Media

- 1993 Outstanding Team ESPY Award (as head coach of the Dallas Cowboys)

Halls of Fame

- College Football Hall of Fame (2012)
- Pro Football Hall of Fame (2020)
- Dallas Cowboys Ring of Honor (2023)

== Personal life ==
Johnson married Linda Kay Cooper on July 12, 1963, with whom he had two sons. They divorced in January 1990. On July 18, 1999, Johnson married Rhonda Rookmaaker. As of 2010, he lives in Islamorada in the Florida Keys.

Johnson owned Three Rings restaurant in Miami and owns JJ's Big Chill, a bar and grill located in Key Largo, Florida at mile marker 104. Three Rings was named after the three championships Johnson won on collegiate and professional levels as a head coach. He previously owned a second restaurant under the same name in Oklahoma City, but it has closed. Johnson's fishing boat, docked behind his oceanfront home in Islamorada, Florida, is also called Three Rings.

== Head coaching record ==
=== College ===
Year	Team	Overall	Conference	Standing	Bowl/playoffs	Coaches^{#}	AP^{°}
Oklahoma State Cowboys (Big Eight Conference) (1979–1983)
1979	Oklahoma State	7–4	5–2	3rd			
1980	Oklahoma State	3–7–1	2–4–1	5th			
1981	Oklahoma State	7–5	4–3	T–3rd	L Independence		
1982	Oklahoma State	4–5–2	3–2–2	3rd			
1983	Oklahoma State	8–4	3–4	4th	W Astro-Bluebonnet	18	
Oklahoma State:		29–25–3	17–15–3				
Miami Hurricanes (NCAA Division I-A independent) (1984–1988)
1984	Miami	8–5			L Fiesta		18
1985	Miami	10–2			L Sugar	8	9
1986	Miami	11–1			L Fiesta	2	2
1987	Miami	12–0			W Orange	1	1
1988	Miami	11–1			W Orange	2	2
Miami:		52–9					
Total:		81–34–3					
National championship Conference title Conference division title or championship game berth
^{#}Rankings from final Coaches Poll.; ^{°}Rankings from final AP Poll.

=== NFL ===
Team	Year	Regular season					Postseason			
Team	Year	Won	Lost	Ties	Win %	Finish	Won	Lost	Win %	Result
DAL	1989	1	15	0	.063	5th in NFC East	—	—	—	—
DAL	1990	7	9	0	.438	4th in NFC East	—	—	—	—
DAL	1991	11	5	0	.688	2nd in NFC East	1	1	.500	Lost to Detroit Lions in NFC Divisional Game
DAL	1992	13	3	0	.813	1st in NFC East	3	0	1.000	Super Bowl XXVII champions
DAL	1993	12	4	0	.750	1st in NFC East	3	0	1.000	Super Bowl XXVIII champions
DAL total		44	36	0	.550		7	1	.875	
MIA	1996	8	8	0	.500	4th in AFC East	—	—	—	—
MIA	1997	9	7	0	.563	2nd in AFC East	0	1	.000	Lost to New England Patriots in AFC Wild Card Game
MIA	1998	10	6	0	.625	2nd in AFC East	1	1	.500	Lost to Denver Broncos in AFC Divisional Game
MIA	1999	9	7	0	.563	3rd in AFC East	1	1	.500	Lost to Jacksonville Jaguars in AFC Divisional Game
MIA total		36	28	0	.563		2	3	.400	
Total		80	64	0	.556		9	4	.692	

== Coaching tree ==
Eleven of Johnson's assistant coaches became NCAA or NFL head coaches:

- Pat Jones: Oklahoma State (1984–1994)
- Houston Nutt: Murray State University (1993–1996), Boise State University (1997), University of Arkansas (1998–2007), University of Mississippi (2008–2011)
- Dave Wannstedt: Chicago Bears (1993–1998), Miami Dolphins (2000–2004), Pittsburgh (2005–2010)
- Norv Turner: Washington Redskins (1994–2000), Oakland Raiders (2004–2005), San Diego Chargers (2007–2012)
- Butch Davis: Miami (FL) (1995–2000), Cleveland Browns (2001–2004), North Carolina (2007–2010), FIU (2017–2021)
- Tommy Tuberville: Ole Miss (1995–1998), Auburn (1999–2008), Texas Tech (2010–2012), Cincinnati (2013–2016)
- John Blake: Oklahoma (1996–1998)
- Dave Campo: Dallas Cowboys (2000–2002)
- Larry Coker: Miami (FL) (2001–2006), UTSA (2009–2015)
- Ed Orgeron: Ole Miss (2005–2007), LSU (2015–2021)
- Randy Shannon: Miami (FL) (2007–2010), Florida (2017, interim)

Two of Johnson's former players have become head coaches in the NFL:

- Jack Del Rio: Jacksonville Jaguars (2003–2011), Oakland Raiders (2015–2017)
- Jason Garrett: Dallas Cowboys (2010, interim, 2011–2019)

Three of Johnson's former players/coaches became general managers in the NFL:

- Butch Davis: Cleveland Browns (2002–2004)
- Steve Keim: Arizona Cardinals (2013–2023)
- Jason Licht: Tampa Bay Buccaneers (2014–present)
