= No Punt Game =

First game in NFL history without a punt by either team

- Candlestick Park, the site of the game
| Buffalo Bills (1–0) | San Francisco 49ers (1–0) |
|---|---|
| 34 | 31 |
| Head coach: Marv Levy | Head coach: George Seifert |
| | 1 | 2 | 3 | 4 | Total |
|---|---|---|---|---|---|
| BUF | 3 | 10 | 14 | 7 | 34 |
| SF | 7 | 17 | 7 | 0 | 31 |
- Date: September 13, 1992
- Stadium: Candlestick Park; San Francisco, California
- Favorite: 49ers by 3.5
- Referee: Red Cashion
- Attendance: 64,053

TV in the United States
- Network: NBC
- Announcers: Dick Enberg (play-by-play); Bob Trumpy (color analyst)

The No Punt Game is the nickname given to a National Football League game held between the Buffalo Bills and San Francisco 49ers on September 13, 1992 at Candlestick Park in San Francisco, California. The game was the first in NFL history to see no punts by either team, as the Bills and 49ers, led by quarterbacks Jim Kelly and Steve Young, respectively, combined for 1,086 total yards of offense, with both quarterbacks passing for over 400 yards. Promoted as a potential Super Bowl "preview", the No Punt Game featured several players now enshrined in the Pro Football Hall of Fame, including Kelly, Young, Andre Reed, James Lofton, Jerry Rice, Thurman Thomas and Bruce Smith. It is remembered as one of the greatest games ever played.

== Background ==
During the late 1980s and early 1990s, ESPN anchor Chris Berman regularly predicted for seven consecutive years through his alter ego, "The Swami", that the Bills and 49ers would match up during a Super Bowl; one or the other – but never both – made it during that span. Likewise, this game was promoted as a "potential Super Bowl preview" by television announcers Dick Enberg and Bob Trumpy.

The starting quarterbacks for the two teams, Steve Young and Jim Kelly, had both played in the United States Football League before joining the NFL. During a 1985 game between Young's Los Angeles Express and Kelly's Houston Gamblers, Los Angeles jumped to a 33–13 lead, but the Gamblers came back under 574 passing yards from Kelly, winning 34–33 in what is now called "The Greatest Game No One Saw", due to ABC deciding to air the New Jersey Generals game as the sole USFL game to be broadcast that week. By 1992, Kelly had become entrenched as the Buffalo Bills' franchise quarterback, while Young was substituting for injured 49ers starter Joe Montana. Buffalo had appeared in the previous two Super Bowls, while San Francisco had missed the playoffs for the first time in nine years despite finishing 10–6 the previous season.

== Game summary ==
The game started slowly, with neither team scoring on their opening possession, due to San Francisco kicker Mike Cofer missing a 33-yard field goal and Jim Kelly getting strip-sacked by the 49ers defense on the ensuing Bills drive. After that, all other drives in the first half aside from a Bills kneeldown at the end resulted in a score. Much like the aforementioned USFL Game, Young's 49ers jumped to an early lead over Kelly's Bills, leading 24–13 after halftime. However, Buffalo would respond with two unanswered touchdown passes from Kelly to tight end Pete Metzelaars, the latter of which occurred after Bills defender Bruce Smith forced 49ers running back Keith Henderson to fumble. The 49ers would retake the lead with their own long touchdown pass from Young to receiver John Taylor. After both quarterbacks threw interceptions on the next two drives, Kelly marched the Bills 72 yards in the 4th quarter, culminating with an 11-yard Thurman Thomas touchdown run to retake the lead 34–31. The 49ers had one last chance to tie or take the lead, but Cofer missed a 47-yard field goal attempt wide-right with 1 minute remaining, allowing Buffalo to kneel out the clock and claim victory.

In addition to neither 49ers punter Klaus Wilmsmeyer nor Bills punter Chris Mohr being called to punt, a first in NFL history, several other offensive milestones were reached in the game. Young and Kelly became just the third pair of NFL quarterbacks to each surpass 400 yards passing in a game, combining for 852 passing yards. This was the only game in 1992 to feature any 400-yard passers. 4 receivers topped 100 yards during the game, and 18 plays went for more than 20 yards, with 5 of those surpassing 40 yards. Bills cornerback Nate Odomes was later quoted saying "You saw two of the finest offensive teams on the field today, and two not-so-good defensive teams." Likewise, 49ers linebacker Mike Walter quipped, "I feel as a defensive guy that I have to go over and apologize to the offensive guys." Despite the perceived lack of defensive play, both teams were able to force three turnovers on each other.

=== Box score ===
Buffalo Bills at San Francisco 49ers – Game summary

| Quarter | 1 | 2 | 3 | 4 | Total |
|---|---|---|---|---|---|
| Bills | 3 | 10 | 14 | 7 | 34 |
| 49ers | 7 | 17 | 7 | 0 | 31 |

at Candlestick Park, San Francisco, California

- Date: September 13
- Game time: 4:00 p.m. EST/1:00 p.m. PDT
- Game weather: 65 °F (18 °C), relative humidity 60%, wind 13 mph
- Game attendance: 64,053
- Referee: Red Cashion
- TV announcers (NBC): Dick Enberg and Bob Trumpy

Game information

First quarter

- SF - Odessa Turner 23-yard pass from Steve Young (Mike Cofer kick), 3:26. 49ers 7–0. Drive: 4 plays, 40 yards, 2:11.
- BUF - Steve Christie 41-yard field goal, 0:18. 49ers 7–3. Drive: 8 plays, 57 yards, 3:08.

Second quarter

- SF - Tom Rathman 2-yard rush (Mike Cofer kick), 11:53. 49ers 14–3. Drive: 7 plays, 80 yards, 3:25.
- BUF - Thurman Thomas 20-yard pass from Jim Kelly (Steve Christie kick), 9:35. 49ers 14–10. Drive: 7 plays, 73 yards, 2:18.
- SF - Mike Cofer 23-yard field goal, 6:53. 49ers 17–10. Drive: 6 plays, 64 yards, 2:42.
- BUF - Steve Christie 28-yard field goal, 2:31. 49ers 17–13. Drive: 10 plays, 80 yards, 4:22
- SF - John Taylor 7-yard pass from Steve Young (Mike Cofer kick), 0:11. 49er 24–13. Drive: 7 plays, 80 yards, 2:20.

Third quarter

- BUF - Pete Metzelaars 53-yard pass from Jim Kelly (Steve Christie kick), 12:33. 49ers 24–20. Drive: 5 plays, 80 yards, 2:27.
- BUF - Pete Metzelaars 24-yard pass from Jim Kelly (Steve Christie kick), 6:51. Bills 27–24. Drive: 5 plays, 60 yards, 1:46.
- SF - John Taylor 54-yard pass from Steve Young (Mike Cofer kick), 0:06. 49ers 31–27. Drive: 4 plays, 60 yards, 1:29.

Fourth quarter

- BUF - Thurman Thomas 11-yard run (Steve Christie kick), 3:04. Bills 34–31. Drive: 12 plays, 72 yards, 3:44.

Top passers

- BUF – Jim Kelly – 22/33, 403 yards, 3 TD, INT
- SF – Steve Young – 26/37, 449 yards, 3 TD, INT

Top rushers

- BUF – Thurman Thomas – 19 rushes, 85 yards, TD
- SF – Ricky Watters – 16 rushes, 83 yards

Top receivers

- BUF – Andre Reed – 10 receptions, 144 yards
- SF – Mike Sherrard – 6 receptions, 159 yards

=== Starting lineups ===
| Buffalo | Position | | San Francisco |
Offense
| James Lofton | WR | SE | John Taylor |
| Will Wolford | LT | | Steve Wallace |
| Jim Ritcher | LG | | Guy McIntyre |
| Kent Hull | C | | Jesse Sapolu |
| Glenn Parker | RG | | Roy Foster |
| Howard Ballard | RT | | Harris Barton |
| Andre Reed | WR | FL | Jerry Rice |
| Thurman Thomas | RB | | Ricky Watters |
| Jim Kelly | QB | | Steve Young |
| Steve Tasker | FL | TE | Brent Jones |
| Don Beebe | FL | FB | Tom Rathman |
Defense
| Phil Hansen | LE | | Pierce Holt |
| Jeff Wright | NT | | Michael Carter |
| Bruce Smith | RE | | Dennis Brown |
| Darryl Talley | ROLB | LCB | Eric Davis |
| Cornelius Bennett | LOLB | RCB | Don Griffin |
| Kirby Jackson | DB | SS | Merton Hanks |
| Kurt Schulz | DB | FS | Dana Hall |
| Nate Odomes | RCB | LOLB | Tim Harris |
| James Williams | LCB | LILB | Mike Walter |
| Henry Jones | SS | RILB | Bill Romanowski |
| Mark Kelso | FS | ROLB | John Johnson |

== Officials ==
- Referee: Red Cashion (#43)
- Umpire: Dave Hamilton (#42)
- Head linesman: Sid Semon (#109)
- Line judge: Charles Stewart (#62)
- Back judge: Dick Creed (#61)
- Side judge: Tom Fincken (#47)
- Field judge: John Robison (#46)

== Aftermath and legacy ==
Buffalo and San Francisco both finished the season strong following the game, but would both see their seasons end with playoff losses to the Dallas Cowboys, the eventual Super Bowl champions. The 49ers would only lose one more game in the regular season, finishing with a 14–2 record and the number 1 seed in the NFC, but lost in the NFC Championship Game to Dallas 30–20. Buffalo would finish second in the AFC East with an 11–5 record and the number 4 seed in the AFC. In the playoffs, the Bills overcame a 35–3 lead by the Houston Oilers in the AFC wild card game, now known as "The Comeback", to win 41–38. Buffalo would make it to the Super Bowl, but lost to Dallas 52–17.

=== Subsequent "no punt" games ===
Since the "No Punt Game", there have been six other regular season games with zero punts by either team. Two came in 2014: during week 4 as the Green Bay Packers defeated the Chicago Bears 38–17, and in week 8, as the New Orleans Saints beat the Packers 44–23. In week 4 of 2021, the Kansas City Chiefs defeated the Philadelphia Eagles 42–30 in a game with no punts. In week 13 of 2023, the Dallas Cowboys defeated the Seattle Seahawks 41–35 without a punt from either team. The Washington Commanders defeated the Cincinnati Bengals 38–33 in week 3 of 2024 without a punt or a turnover from either team, the first time this has occurred since 1940. That same season in week 17, the Detroit Lions defeated the San Francisco 49ers 40–34 in a game that featured 10 combined touchdowns and zero punts, the first time this has occurred since 1937. Of all "no punt games" in recorded NFL history, the 1992 Bills–49ers game had the highest number of total combined turnovers at six.

The first playoff no-punt game occurred during the 2003–04 NFL playoffs as the 3 seed Indianapolis Colts led by Peyton Manning, Edgerrin James, and Reggie Wayne defeated the 2 seed Kansas City Chiefs led by Trent Green, Dante Hall, and Priest Holmes, by a 38–31 score in the Divisional round.

== See also ==
- 2018 Kansas City Chiefs–Los Angeles Rams game
