= 1992 Buffalo Bills season =

33rd season in franchise history, third straight Super Bowl appearance and loss

- Owner: Ralph Wilson
- General manager: Bill Polian
- Head coach: Marv Levy
- Offensive coordinator: Tom Bresnahan
- Defensive coordinator: Walt Corey
- Home stadium: Rich Stadium

Results
- Record: 11–5
- Division place: 2nd AFC East
- Playoffs: Won Wild Card Playoffs (vs. Oilers) 41–38 (OT); Won Divisional Playoffs (at Steelers) 24–3; Won AFC Championship (at Dolphins) 29–10; Lost Super Bowl XXVII (vs. Cowboys) 17–52
- All-Pros: 4: SS Henry Jones (1st team); QB Jim Kelly (2nd team); RB Thurman Thomas (2nd team); DT Bruce Smith (2nd team)
- Pro Bowlers: 10: QB Jim Kelly; RB Thurman Thomas; WR Andre Reed; OT Howard Ballard; OT Will Wolford; G Jim Ritcher; OLB Cornelius Bennett; DT Bruce Smith; SS Henry Jones; ST Steve Tasker

The 1992 Buffalo Bills season was the 33rd season for the team in the National Football League (NFL). The Buffalo Bills entered the season as defending back to back AFC champions and finished the National Football League's 1992 season with a record of 11 wins and 5 losses, and finished second in the AFC East division. The Bills qualified for their third straight Super Bowl appearance, but were dealt their third loss in as many appearances, this time losing to the Dallas Cowboys by a score of 52–17. This would be the only time the Bills did not finish first in the AFC Eastern Division from 1988 to 1993.

== Season summary ==
The season is notable for Buffalo's first playoff game in this year, known as "The Comeback", in which the Bills, down 35–3, ended up winning in overtime 41–38. The game was the first of three Buffalo playoff wins (the two others were at Pittsburgh and at Miami) that allowed the Bills to win their third consecutive AFC Championship. In Super Bowl XXVII, Dallas beat Buffalo, 52–17.

In Week Two of the season, the Bills traveled to San Francisco, defeating the 49ers 34–31. The matchup was notable for being the first game in NFL history without a punt by either team.

== Offseason ==
Additions	Subtractions
DE Keith Willis (Steelers)	LB Ray Bentley (Bengals)
RB Kenny Gamble (Chiefs)	K Scott Norwood (retirement)
	G Joe Staysniak (Chiefs)
	TE Butch Rolle (Cardinals)
	DE Leon Seals (Eagles)

=== NFL draft ===
1992 Buffalo Bills draft
Round	Pick	Player	Position	College	Notes
1	27	John Fina	Offensive tackle	Arizona	
2	55	James Patton	Defensive End	Texas	
3	83	Keith Goganious	Linebacker	Penn State	
4	111	Frank Kmet	Defensive end	Purdue	
5	139	Matt Darby	Safety	UCLA	
6	167	Nate Turner	Running back	Nebraska	
7	195	Kurt Schulz	Safety	Eastern Washington	
8	223	Leonard Humphries	Cornerback	Penn State	
9	251	Chris Walsh	Wide receiver	Stanford	
10	279	Barry Rose	Wide receiver	Wisconsin–Stevens Point	
11	307	Vince Marrow	Tight end	Toledo	
12	335	Matt Rodgers	Quarterback	Iowa	
Made roster

=== Undrafted free agents ===
1992 undrafted free agents of note
Player	Position	College
Jason Childs	Tackle	North Dakota
Jim Crouch	Kicker	Sacramento State
Doug Helkowski	Punter	Penn State

== Personnel ==
=== Staff ===
1992 Buffalo Bills staff
Front office: President – Ralph Wilson; Vice-president of administration/general manager – Bill Polian; Vice-president of football operations – Marv Levy; Assistant general manager/director of pro personnel – Bob Ferguson; Director of player personnel – John Butler; Assistant director/collegiate scouting – A. J. Smith; Head coaches: Head coach – Marv Levy; Assistant head coach/running backs – Elijah Pitts; Administrative assistant to the head coach/Defensive Quality Control – Chuck Lester; Offensive coaches: Offensive coordinator/offensive line – Tom Bresnahan; Quarterbacks – Jim Shofner; Receivers – Charlie Joiner; Offensive quality control/tight ends – Don Lawrence	Defensive coaches: Defensive coordinator/linebackers – Walt Corey; Defensive line – Dan Sekanovich; Defensive backs – Dick Roach; Special teams coaches: Special teams – Bruce DeHaven; Strength and conditioning: Strength and conditioning coordinator – Rusty Jones

=== Roster ===
1992 Buffalo Bills roster
Quarterbacks (QB): 7 Gale Gilbert; 12 Jim Kelly; 14 Frank Reich; Running backs (RB): 23 Kenneth Davis KR; 35 Carwell Gardner FB; 34 Thurman Thomas; Wide receivers (WR): 82 Don Beebe; 85 Al Edwards WR; 80 James Lofton; 83 Andre Reed; 89 Steve Tasker; Tight ends (TE): 86 Rob Awalt; 84 Keith McKeller; 88 Pete Metzelaars	Offensive linemen (OL): 75 Howard Ballard T; 65 John Davis G; 70 John Fina T; 59 Mitch Frerotte C; 67 Kent Hull C; 63 Adam Lingner; 74 Glenn Parker G; 51 Jim Ritcher G; 69 Will Wolford T; Defensive linemen (DL): 90 Phil Hansen DE; 73 Mike Lodish NT; 94 Mark Pike DE; 78 Bruce Smith DE; 93 Keith Willis DE; 91 Jeff Wright NT	Linebackers (LB): 54 Carlton Bailey ILB; 97 Cornelius Bennett OLB; 58 Shane Conlan ILB; 95 Keith Goganious OLB; 52 Richard Harvey ILB; 55 Mark Maddox OLB; 53 Marvcus Patton ILB; 56 Darryl Talley ILB; Defensive backs (DB): 43 Matt Darby SS; 27 Cliff Hicks CB/PR; 47 Kirby Jackson CB; 20 Henry Jones SS; 38 Mark Kelso FS; 37 Nate Odomes CB; 24 Kurt Schulz FS; 31 James Williams CB; Special teams (ST): 2 Steve Christie K; 9 Chris Mohr P	Practice squad: 68 Sean Love G; 8 Matt Rodgers QB; 19 Barry Rose WR; 18 Chris Walsh WR; Reserve: 66 Jerry Crafts T (IR); 33 Eddie Fuller (IR); 26 Chris Hale CB/PR (IR); 81 Brad Lamb (IR); 99 James Patton NT (IR); 61 Jeff Stephenson LB (IR); 87 Ed Thomas TE (IR); 49 Nate Turner FB (IR); 22 Darryl Wren CB (PUP); 47 active, 9 inactive, 4 practice squad Rookies in italics

== Schedule ==
Week	Date	Opponent	Result	Record	Venue	Attendance
1	September 6	Los Angeles Rams	**W** 40–7	1–0	Rich Stadium	79,001
2	September 13	at San Francisco 49ers	**W** 34–31	2–0	Candlestick Park	64,053
3	September 20	**Indianapolis Colts**	**W** 38–0	3–0	Rich Stadium	77,781
4	September 27	at **New England Patriots**	**W** 41–7	4–0	Foxboro Stadium	52,527
5	October 4	**Miami Dolphins**	**L** 10–37	4–1	Rich Stadium	80,368
6	October 11	at Los Angeles Raiders	**L** 3–20	4–2	Los Angeles Memorial Coliseum	52,287
7	Bye					
8	October 26	at **New York Jets**	**W** 24–20	5–2	Giants Stadium	68,181
9	November 1	**New England Patriots**	**W** 16–7	6–2	Rich Stadium	78,268
10	November 8	Pittsburgh Steelers	**W** 28–20	7–2	Rich Stadium	80,294
11	November 16	at **Miami Dolphins**	**W** 26–20	8–2	Joe Robbie Stadium	70,629
12	November 22	Atlanta Falcons	**W** 41–14	9–2	Rich Stadium	80,004
13	November 29	at **Indianapolis Colts**	**L** 13–16 (OT)	9–3	Hoosier Dome	50,221
14	December 6	**New York Jets**	**L** 24–17	9–4	Rich Stadium	75,876
15	December 12	Denver Broncos	**W** 27–17	10–4	Rich Stadium	71,740
16	December 20	at New Orleans Saints	**W** 20–16	11–4	Louisiana Superdome	68,591
17	December 27	at Houston Oilers	**L** 3–27	11–5	Astrodome	61,742
Note: Intra-division opponents are in **bold** text.

=== Game summaries ===
==== Week 1 ====
Los Angeles Rams at Buffalo Bills

Team	1	2	3	4	Total
Rams	0	7	0	0	7
• **Bills**	14	13	7	6	40

- Date: September 6
- Location: Rich Stadium, Orchard Park, New York
- Game start: 1:00 p.m. EST
- Referee: Larry Nemmers
- TV announcers (CBS): Paul Olden and Hank Stram
- Source: Pro-Football-Reference.com

Scoring summary
1	Bills	Thurman Thomas 10 yard pass from Jim Kelly (Steve Christie kick)	Bills 7–0
1	Bills	Thurman Thomas 1 yard run (Steve Christie kick)	Bills 14–0
2	Bills	Thurman Thomas 6 yard run (Steve Christie kick)	Bills 21–0
2	Rams	Robert Delpino 12 yard pass from Jim Everett (Tony Zendejas kick)	Bills 21–7
2	Bills	Mitch Frerotte 2 yard pass from Jim Kelly (kick failed)	Bills 27–7
3	Bills	Thurman Thomas 10 yard run (Steve Christie kick)	Bills 34–7
4	Bills	Steve Christie 49 yard field goal	Bills 37–7
4	Bills	Steve Christie 38 yard field goal	Bills 40–7

Hosting the L.A. Rams, the Bills picked off Jim Everett four times and limited the Rams to 215 total yards. Thurman Thomas led a 207-yard rushing attack for the Bills as Jim Kelly needed only 106 passing yards and two scores for the 40–7 win.

==== Week 2 ====
Team	1	2	3	4	Total
• Bills	3	10	14	7	34
49ers	7	17	7	0	31

- Date: September 13
- Location: Candlestick Park
- Game start: 1:00 p.m. PST
- Referee: Red Cashion
- TV announcers (NBC): Dick Enberg and Bob Trumpy

Buffalo's 34–31 win over the San Francisco 49ers was the first game in NFL history in which neither team punted. Over 1,000 yards in combined offense for both teams.

==== Week 3 ====
Team	1	2	3	4	Total
Colts	0	0	0	0	0
• Bills	7	3	14	14	38

- Date: September 20
- Location: Rich Stadium

The Indianapolis Colts were limited to nine first downs, 140 total yards, and three interceptions (one by quarterback/punter Tom Tupa) in a 38–0 Bills shutout.

==== Week 4 ====
Team	1	2	3	4	Total
• Bills	3	3	21	14	41
Patriots	0	0	0	7	7

- Date: September 27
- Location: Foxboro Stadium
- Game attendance: 52,527
- Referee: Tom White
- TV announcers (NBC): Don Criqui and Paul Maguire

The winless Patriots held off the Bills for a 6–0 Bills lead at halftime before 35 Buffalo points led to yet another Buffalo runaway win, 41–7.

==== Week 5 ====
Team	1	2	3	4	Total
• Dolphins	3	14	17	3	37
Bills	3	7	0	0	10

- Date: October 4
- Location: Rich Stadium
- Game start: 1:00 p.m. EST
- Referee: Dale Hamer
- TV announcers (NBC): Dick Enberg and Bob Trumpy

Dan Marino ended Buffalo's season-opening win streak, throwing three touchdowns and 282 total yards. Jim Kelly was intercepted four times as the Dolphins won 37–10.

==== Week 6 ====
Team	1	2	3	4	Total
Bills	0	3	0	0	3
• Raiders	7	10	3	0	20

- Date: October 11
- Location: Los Angeles Memorial Coliseum
- Referee: Pat Haggerty
- TV announcers (NBC): Dick Enberg and Bob Trumpy

The Bills flew to Los Angeles and were rudely greeted by the 1–4 Raiders; they sacked Jim Kelly five times and picked him off once, storming to a 20–3 win.

==== Week 8 ====
Team	1	2	3	4	Total
• Bills	0	14	3	7	24
Jets	3	3	7	7	20

- Date: October 26
- Location: Giants Stadium, East Rutherford, New Jersey
- Game start: 9:00 p.m. EST
- Game weather: 46 °F (8 °C) • Wind 19 mph (31 km/h)
- Referee: Bernie Kukar
- TV announcers (ABC): Al Michaels, Frank Gifford, and Dan Dierdorf

Scoring summary
1	NYJ	Cary Blanchard 42 yard field goal	Jets 3–0
2	BUF	Kenneth Davis 2 yard run (Steve Christie kick)	Bills 7–3
2	NYJ	Cary Blanchard 40 yard field goal	Bills 7–6
2	BUF	James Lofton 16 yard pass from Jim Kelly (Steve Christie kick)	Bills 14–6
3	NYJ	Pat Chaffey 1 yard run (Cary Blanchard kick)	Bills 14–13
3	BUF	Steve Christie 33 yard field goal	Bills 17–13
4	NYJ	Brad Baxter 1 yard run (Cary Blanchard kick)	Jets 20–17
4	BUF	Thurman Thomas 12 yard pass from Jim Kelly (Steve Christie kick)	Bills 24–20

The Jets hosted the Bills in a back-and-forth affair. The Bills led 17–13 in the fourth before Brad Baxter ran in a one-yard score, but Kelly led the Bills downfield and found Thurman Thomas from twelve yards out and the 24–20 Bills win.

==== Week 9 ====
Team	1	2	3	4	Total
Patriots	0	7	0	0	7
• Bills	0	0	9	7	16

- Date: November 1
- Location: Rich Stadium
- Game start: 1:00 PM EST
- Game attendance: 78,268
- Referee: Gordon McCarter
- TV announcers (NBC): Don Criqui and Paul Maguire

The Patriots traveled to Rich Stadium and the two teams managed six turnovers and just 484 total yards. The Bills fell behind 7–0 on Vincent Brown's 25-yard fumble return score, then scored 16 unanswered points on two touchdowns and a safety when Shawn McCarthy was downed in the endzone.

==== Week 10 ====
Team	1	2	3	4	Total
Steelers	0	6	14	0	20
• Bills	7	14	7	0	28

- Date: November 8
- Location: Rich Stadium
- Game attendance: 80,294
- Referee: Bob McElwee
- TV announcers (NBC): Marv Albert and Bill Parcells

==== Week 11 ====
Team	1	2	3	4	Total
• Bills	3	10	13	0	26
Dolphins	7	10	0	3	20

- Date: November 16
- Location: Joe Robbie Stadium
- Game start: 9:00 p.m. EST
- Referee: Tom White
- TV announcers (ABC): Al Michaels, Frank Gifford, and Dan Dierdorf

==== Week 12 ====
Team	1	2	3	4	Total
Falcons	0	7	0	7	14
• Bills	28	10	0	3	41

- Date: November 22
- Location: Rich Stadium
- Game start: 1pm EST
- Game attendance: 80,004
- Game weather: 51 °F (11 °C) wind 15 mph (24 km/h)
- Referee: Johnny Grier
- TV announcers (CBS): Tim Ryan and Matt Millen

Buffalo set an NFL record by rushing for 315 yards in a game as the Atlanta Falcons managed 174 yards of total offense and were hammered 41–14.

==== Week 13 ====
Team	1	2	3	4	OT	Total
Bills	0	3	7	3	0	13
• Colts	0	3	0	10	3	16

- Date: November 29
- Location: Hoosier Dome
- Referee: Larry Nemmers
- TV announcers (NBC): Don Criqui and Paul Maguire

==== Week 14 ====
Team	1	2	3	4	Total
• Jets	3	0	14	7	24
Bills	3	7	0	7	17

- Date: December 6
- Location: Rich Stadium
- Game start: 1:00 p.m. EST
- Referee: Dick Hantak
- TV announcers (NBC): Marv Albert, Bill Parcells

The Bills fell to the Jets 24–17 in a game the Jets needed far more than the Bills following a paralyzing injury to Dennis Byrd; the Jets had needed emotional counseling all week leading to the game, and came out inspired when coach Bruce Coslet told players beforehand that Byrd was recovering movement. Brad Baxter ran in two touchdowns; after the Bills tied the game 17–17 Brian Washington intercepted Kelly and scored. Following the 24–17 Jets win, both teams met at midfield in prayer for Dennis Byrd.

==== Week 15 ====
Team	1	2	3	4	Total
Broncos	0	0	7	10	17
• Bills	0	21	3	3	27

- Date: December 12
- Location: Rich Stadium
- Game start: 1:00 p.m. EST
- Referee: Gary Lane
- TV announcers (NBC): Dick Enberg and Bob Trumpy

The Bills scored the first 24 points, opening up on a triple lateral to Kelly who then unloaded a 64-yard score to wide open Don Beebe. The Broncos started Tommy Maddox with John Elway out for the fourth straight game, then put in Shawn Moore who threw three picks; the two combined for 250 yards passing.

==== Week 16 ====
Buffalo Bills (10–4) at New Orleans Saints (11–3)

Team	1	2	3	4	Total
• Bills	3	0	7	10	20
Saints	6	7	3	0	16

- Date: December 20
- Location: Louisiana Superdome
- Game start: 1:00 PM EST
- Game attendance: 68,591
- Game weather: Dome
- Referee: Howard Roe
- TV announcers (NBC): Don Criqui and Paul Maguire

==== Week 17 ====
Team	1	2	3	4	Total
Bills	3	0	0	0	3
• Oilers	10	10	0	7	27

- Date: December 27
- Location: Houston Astrodome
- Referee: Jerry Markbreit
- TV announcers (ESPN): Mike Patrick and Joe Theismann

At the Astrodome Jim Kelly was intercepted once and injured in the final game of the season, forcing Frank Reich to take over as starting quarterback to begin the playoffs. Reich was picked off twice as the Oilers behind Warren Moon and Cody Carlson stormed to a 27–3 win, securing a wildcard playoff berth, where one week later they would travel to Buffalo to face Reich again.

=== Standings ===
AFC East
	W	L	T	PCT	DIV	CONF	PF	PA	STK
^{(2)} Miami Dolphins	11	5	0	.688	5–3	9–3	340	281	W3
^{(4)} Buffalo Bills	11	5	0	.688	5–3	7–5	381	283	L1
Indianapolis Colts	9	7	0	.563	5–3	7–7	216	302	W5
New York Jets	4	12	0	.250	3–5	4–8	220	315	L3
New England Patriots	2	14	0	.125	2–6	2–10	205	363	L5

== Playoffs ==
Round	Date	Opponent (seed)	Result	Record	Venue	Recap
Wildcard	January 3, 1993	Houston Oilers (5)	W 41–38 (OT)	1–0	Rich Stadium	75,141
Divisional	January 9, 1993	at Pittsburgh Steelers (1)	W 24–3	2–0	Three Rivers Stadium	60,407
AFC Championship	January 17, 1993	at Miami Dolphins (2)	W 29–10	3–0	Joe Robbie Stadium	72,703
Super Bowl XXVII	January 31, 1993	vs. Dallas Cowboys (N2)	L 17–52	3–1	Rose Bowl	98,374

=== Wild Card ===
Team	1	2	3	4	OT	Total
Oilers	7	21	7	3	0	38
• Bills	3	0	28	7	3	41

- Date: January 3
- Location: Rich Stadium
- Game weather: Cloudy
- Referee: Gerald Austin
- TV announcers (NBC): Charlie Jones and Todd Christensen

Frank Reich's defining moment in his pro career is actually another comeback, this one often called the greatest comeback in NFL playoff history. It was also the largest comeback in NFL history, with the Bills overcoming a 32-point deficit, until 2022, when the Minnesota Vikings overcame a 33-point deficit against the Indianapolis Colts. In the playoffs following the 1992 season against the Houston Oilers. Reich led the Bills on a 35–3 run in the second half before overtime, en route to a 41–38 victory on a Steve Christie field goal. Reich would help the Bills defeat the Pittsburgh Steelers in the divisional round before once again giving the team back to Kelly, who led them into Super Bowl XXVII, where they were annihilated by the Dallas Cowboys 52–17. Reich had to enter the game when starter Jim Kelly was forced out of the game with a knee injury during the 2nd quarter.

- HOU – Jeffires 3-yard pass from Moon (Del Greco kick) 7–0 HOU
- BUF – FG Christie 36-yards 7–3 HOU
- HOU – Slaughter 7-yard pass from Moon (Del Greco kick) 14–3 HOU
- HOU – Duncan 26-yard pass from Moon (Del Greco kick) 21–3 HOU
- HOU – Jeffires 27-yard pass from Moon (Del Greco kick) 28–3 HOU
- HOU – McDowell 58-yard interception return (Del Greco kick) 35–3 HOU
- BUF – K. Davis 1-yard run (Christie kick) 35–10 HOU
- BUF – Beebe 38-yard pass from Reich (Christie kick) 35–17 HOU
- BUF – Reed 26-yard pass from Reich (Christie kick) 35–24 HOU
- BUF – Reed 18-yard pass from Reich (Christie kick) 35–31 HOU
- BUF – Reed 17-yard pass from Reich (Christie kick) 38–35 BUF
- HOU – FG Del Greco 26-yards 38–38 tie
- BUF – FG Christie 32-yards 41–38 BUF

=== Divisional ===
Team	1	2	3	4	Total
• Bills	0	7	7	10	24
Steelers	3	0	0	0	3

- Date: January 9
- Location: Three Rivers Stadium
- Game start: 12:30 PM EST
- Game attendance: 60,407
- Game weather: 31 °F (−1 °C) • 14 miles per hour (23 km/h; 12 kn); wind chill 21
- Referee: Bernie Kukar
- TV announcers (NBC): Marv Albert, Bill Parcells; O. J. Simpson and John Dockery (sidelines). Will McDonough, Bob Costas, and Warren Moon in studio/halftime.

=== Conference Championship ===
Team	1	2	3	4	Total
• Bills	3	10	10	6	29
Dolphins	3	0	0	7	10

- Date: January 16
- Location: Joe Robbie Stadium
- Referee: Bob McElwee
- TV announcers (NBC): Dick Enberg and Bob Trumpy

With the win, the Bills advanced to their 3rd straight Super Bowl. This would be their last playoff win on the road until 2025.

=== Super Bowl ===
Team	1	2	3	4	Total
Bills	7	3	7	0	17
• Cowboys	14	14	3	21	52

- Date: January 31
- Location: Rose Bowl
- Game weather: Sunny
- Referee: Dick Hantak
- TV announcers (NBC): Dick Enberg and Bob Trumpy

The Bills entered Super Bowl XXVII trying to avoid becoming the first team to lose three consecutive Super Bowls. Once again the team was loaded with talent, boasting 12 Pro Bowl selections. During the regular season, Buffalo's no-huddle offense ranked as the number two offense in the league (6,114 yards) and ranked as the number one rushing offense (2,436). Running back Thurman Thomas rushed for 1,487 yards and 9 touchdowns during the regular season, while also catching 58 passes for 626 yards and another 3 touchdowns. Running back Kenneth Davis rushed for 613 yards, caught 15 passes for 80 yards, and added another 251 yards returning kickoffs. Quarterback Jim Kelly had 269 out of 462 completions for 3,457 yards, 23 touchdowns, and 19 interceptions. Wide receiver Andre Reed lead the team with 65 receptions for 913 yards and 3 touchdowns, receiver James Lofton contributed 51 receptions for 786 yards and 6 touchdowns, and wide receiver Don Beebe had 33 receptions for 554 and 2 touchdowns. Also tight end Pete Metzelaars recorded 30 receptions for 298 yards and 6 touchdowns. The Bills also had one of the best offensive lines in the NFL, led by Pro Bowlers Will Wolford, Jim Ritcher, and Howard Ballard, along with center Kent Hull.

On defense, the line was anchored by tackles Bruce Smith (14 sacks) and Jeff Wright (6 sacks, 1 fumble recovery), who were fully recovered after missing almost all of the previous season due to injuries. The Bills were once again led by their trio of linebackers Darryl Talley (77 tackles, 4 sacks), Shane Conlan (66 tackles, 2 sacks, 1 interception), and Pro Bowler Cornelius Bennett (52 tackles, 4 sacks, 3 fumble recoveries). The defensive secondary was aided by the emergence of second year defensive back Henry Jones, who led the NFL with 8 interceptions, returning them for 263 yards and 2 touchdowns. Defensive back Mark Kelso recorded 7 interceptions, while Pro Bowl defensive back Nate Odomes had 5.

However, the Bills quest for a third consecutive Super Bowl suffered a major setback when they lost the final game of the season to the Houston Oilers. The loss caused the Bills to finish with an 11–5 record, losing the AFC East title to the Miami Dolphins based on tiebreaking rules, and thus making them a wild card team for the playoffs. Thus, even if they won their first playoff game, they would have to win two on the road to make the Super Bowl. To make matters worse, Kelly also suffered strained knee ligaments during the loss to the Oilers and had to miss the first 2 playoff games. Furthermore, their first opponent in the playoffs ended up being the Oilers. A headline on a Buffalo newspaper stated the Bills situation: "Bills Begin The Longest Road Today."

==== Starting lineups ====
Position	Name
WR	James Lofton
LT	Will Wolford
LG	Jim Ritcher
C	Kent Hull
RG	Glenn Parker
RT	Howard Ballard
TE	Pete Metzelaars
WR	Andre Reed
QB	Jim Kelly
RB	Thurman Thomas
FB-WR	Don Beebe

Position	Name
LE	Phil Hansen
LDT-NT	Jeff Wright
RDT-RE	Bruce Smith
RE-LOLB	Marvcus Patton
LOLB-LILB	Shane Conlan
MLB-RILB	Cornelius Bennett
ROLB	Darryl Talley
LCB	James Williams
RCB	Nate Odomes
SS	Henry Jones
FS	Mark Kelso

==== Scoring Summary ====
- BUF – TD: Thurman Thomas 2-yard run (Steve Christie kick) 7–0 BUF
- DAL – TD: Jay Novacek 23-yard pass from Troy Aikman (Lin Elliott kick) 7–7 tie
- DAL – TD: Jimmie Jones 2-yard fumble return (Lin Elliott kick) 14–7 DAL
- BUF – FG: Steve Christie 21 yards 14–10 DAL
- DAL – TD: Michael Irvin 19-yard pass from Troy Aikman (Lin Elliott kick) 21–10 DAL
- DAL – TD: Michael Irvin 18-yard pass from Troy Aikman (Lin Elliott kick) 28–10 DAL
- DAL – FG: Lin Elliott 20 yards 31–10 DAL
- BUF – TD: Don Beebe 40-yard pass from Frank Reich (Steve Christie kick) 31–17 DAL
- DAL – TD: Alvin Harper 45-yard pass from Troy Aikman (Lin Elliott kick) 38–17 DAL
- DAL – TD: Emmitt Smith 10-yard run (Lin Elliott kick) 45–17 DAL
- DAL – TD: Ken Norton Jr. 9-yard fumble return (Lin Elliott kick) 52–17 DAL

== Awards and records ==
- Fewest Rushing Yards allowed in NFL, 1,395 yards
- Led NFL in Total Yards Rushing, 2,436 yards
- Led AFC in Points Scored, 381
- Led AFC in Yards Gained, 5893
- Set NFL record for most rushing yards by a club in one game (315)
- Steve Christie, Tied NFL record, Most Field Goals Attempted in a Playoff Game (6)
- Steve Christie, Tied NFL record, Most Field Goals Made in a Playoff Game (5)
- Henry Jones, Tied NFL Lead, 8 Interceptions
- Steve Tasker, Pro Bowl MVP
- Thurman Thomas, AFC Leader, 12 Touchdowns
