= 2014 NFL season =

American football season

Regular season
- Duration: September 4 – December 28, 2014

Playoffs
- Start date: January 3, 2015
- AFC Champions: New England Patriots
- NFC Champions: Seattle Seahawks

Super Bowl XLIX
- Date: February 1, 2015
- Site: University of Phoenix Stadium, Glendale, Arizona
- Champions: New England Patriots

Pro Bowl
- Date: January 25, 2015
- Site: University of Phoenix Stadium, Glendale, Arizona

AFC teams: West, North, South, East
NFC teams: West, North, South, East

The 2014 NFL season was the 95th season in the history of the National Football League (NFL) and the 49th of the Super Bowl era. The season began on Thursday, September 4, 2014, with the annual kickoff game featuring the defending Super Bowl XLVIII champion Seattle Seahawks hosting the Green Bay Packers, which resulted with the Seahawks winning. The season concluded with Super Bowl XLIX, the league's championship game, on Sunday, February 1, 2015, at University of Phoenix Stadium in Glendale, Arizona, with the New England Patriots defeating the Seahawks 28–24, in one of the closest games in Super Bowl history.

Some notable events of the season include every team losing at least 4 games, the Carolina Panthers going to the playoffs despite having a losing record, the NFC Championship Game where the Seahawks would make a comeback against the Packers, and Super Bowl XLIX where the Patriots would intercept the ball at the one yard line and win the game.

== Player movement ==
The 2014 league year began at 4 pm EST on March 11, which marked the start of the league's free agency period. The per-team salary cap was set at US$133 million, a $10 million increase from the previous year. The so-called "legal tampering" period during which time agents representing prospective unrestricted free agent players (though not the players themselves) were allowed to have contact with team representatives with the purpose of determining a player's market value and to begin contract negotiations, began at noon (EST) on March 8.

=== Free agency ===
A total of 471 players were eligible for some form of free agency at the beginning of the free agency period. In addition, a number of highly paid players were released after the start of the league year to allow their teams to regain space under the salary cap. Among the high-profile players who changed teams via free agency were:

- Quarterbacks Josh McCown (Chicago to Tampa Bay), Mark Sanchez (New York Jets to Philadelphia) and Michael Vick (Philadelphia to New York Jets)
- Running backs LeGarrette Blount (New England to Pittsburgh), Donald Brown (Indianapolis to San Diego), Toby Gerhart (Minnesota to Jacksonville), Chris Johnson (Tennessee to New York Jets), Maurice Jones-Drew (Jacksonville to Oakland) and Ben Tate (Houston to Cleveland)
- Wide receivers Kenny Britt (Tennessee to St. Louis), Eric Decker (Denver to New York Jets), Devin Hester (Chicago to Atlanta), DeSean Jackson (Philadelphia to Washington), James Jones (Green Bay to Oakland), Hakeem Nicks (New York Giants to Indianapolis), Andre Roberts (Arizona to Washington), Emmanuel Sanders (Pittsburgh to Denver), Steve Smith (Carolina to Baltimore) and Golden Tate (Seattle to Detroit)
- Tight ends Owen Daniels (Houston to Baltimore) and Brandon Myers (New York Giants to Tampa Bay)
- Offensive tackles Branden Albert (Kansas City to Miami), Austin Howard (New York Jets to Oakland), Michael Oher (Baltimore to Tennessee) and Jared Veldheer (Oakland to Arizona)
- Guards Zane Beadles (Denver to Jacksonville), Shawn Lauvao (Cleveland to Washington) and Geoff Schwartz (Kansas City to New York Giants)
- Defensive tackles Jason Hatcher (Dallas to Washington), Arthur Jones (Baltimore to Indianapolis), Linval Joseph (New York Giants to Minnesota) and Paul Soliai (Miami to Atlanta)
- Defensive ends Jared Allen (Minnesota to Chicago), Lamarr Houston (Oakland to Chicago), Tyson Jackson (Kansas City to Atlanta), Michael Johnson (Cincinnati to Tampa Bay), Julius Peppers (Chicago to Green Bay), Antonio Smith (Houston to Oakland), Justin Tuck (New York Giants to Oakland), DeMarcus Ware (Dallas to Denver) and Willie Young (Detroit to Chicago)
- Linebackers Karlos Dansby (Arizona to Cleveland), D'Qwell Jackson (Cleveland to Indianapolis), Wesley Woodyard (Denver to Tennessee) and LaMarr Woodley (Pittsburgh to Oakland)
- Cornerbacks Brandon Flowers (Kansas City to San Diego), Corey Graham (Baltimore to Buffalo), Captain Munnerlyn (Carolina to Minnesota), Darrelle Revis (Tampa Bay to New England), Dominique Rodgers-Cromartie (Denver to New York Giants), Aqib Talib (New England to Denver) and Alterraun Verner (Tennessee to Tampa Bay)
- Safeties Antoine Bethea (Indianapolis to San Francisco), Jairus Byrd (Buffalo to New Orleans), T. J. Ward (Cleveland to Denver) and Donte Whitner (San Francisco to Cleveland)

Four players were assigned the non-exclusive franchise tag by their teams, which ensured that the team would receive compensation were the player to sign a contract with another team. These players were defensive end Greg Hardy (Panthers), tight end Jimmy Graham (Saints), placekicker Nick Folk (Jets) and linebacker Brian Orakpo (Redskins). Two other teams used the transition tag, which offers the player's current team a chance to match offers from other franchises and also guarantees draft pick compensation (at a lesser level than the franchise tag) if a tagged player signs elsewhere. Players given the transition tag were Jason Worilds (Steelers) and Alex Mack (Browns). Mack signed a five-year, $42 million offer sheet with the Jacksonville Jaguars which included $26 million in guaranteed money and a player option to void the contract after two seasons. The Browns matched the offer and retained Mack who became the league's highest paid center.

One restricted free agent switched teams in 2014: wide receiver Andrew Hawkins of the Bengals was signed by the Browns. Restricted free agents are players with three or fewer seasons in the league whose contracts have expired. Teams may tender contract offers which allow them to match offers from other teams (i.e. the player's current team gets "right of first refusal") and may trigger draft pick compensation to be received from the signing team. Hawkins was tendered at the minimum level, which means the Bengals would not receive any draft compensation. The Browns signed him to a $13.6 million, four-year offer, which the Bengals declined to match. Saints safety Rafael Bush signed an offer from the Falcons, but the Saints retained Bush by matching the offer.

=== Trades ===
The following notable trades were made during the 2014 league year:

- March 11: Miami traded OT Jonathan Martin to San Francisco for a conditional draft pick
- March 11: Jacksonville traded QB Blaine Gabbert to San Francisco for a sixth-round draft pick
- March 13: New Orleans traded RB Darren Sproles to Philadelphia for a fifth-round draft pick
- May 9: Buffalo traded WR Stevie Johnson to San Francisco for a fourth-round draft pick in 2015
- May 10: Philadelphia traded RB Bryce Brown to Buffalo for a fourth-round draft pick in 2015
- August 26: New England traded G Logan Mankins to Tampa Bay for a fourth-round draft pick in 2015
- August 31: New England traded QB Ryan Mallett to Houston for a sixth-round draft pick in 2015
- October 17: Seattle traded WR Percy Harvin to New York Jets for a sixth-round draft pick
- October 28: Tampa Bay traded LB Mark Barron to St. Louis for a fourth- and sixth-round picks in 2015

=== Draft ===
The 2014 NFL draft was held May 8–10, 2014, in New York City. The draft process began with the NFL Scouting Combine, where draft-eligible players were evaluated by team personnel, which was held in Indianapolis on February 19–25. The draft included a record number of 98 non-seniors. The event was delayed roughly two weeks compared to its traditional position on the NFL calendar in late April due to a scheduling conflict at Radio City Music Hall, which had been the draft venue since 2006. In the draft, the Houston Texans made University of South Carolina defensive end, now outside linebacker Jadeveon Clowney the first overall selection.

There was discussion leading up to the draft as to the future of the event in New York City, where it had been held since 1965. Given the increased interest in the draft over the past decade, there was a belief that the event may have outgrown Radio City Music Hall, which was the venue for the past nine drafts. The possibility of extending the draft to four days was also being discussed. On October 2, 2014, Auditorium Theatre in Chicago was announced as the official site for the following year's draft.

== New referees ==
Referees Scott Green and Ron Winter retired after the 2013 season. Ron Torbert, who spent the past four seasons as a side judge, and Craig Wrolstad, who spent the past 11 seasons as a field judge, were promoted to referee to replace Green and Winter. On June 25, 2014, the NFL announced Mike Carey's retirement as a referee. Like former director of officiating Mike Pereira for Fox Sports, Carey will become the rules/refereeing analyst for CBS's NFL coverage on the network's Thursday night and Sunday afternoon games. He was replaced by Brad Allen, who spent the past nine seasons as an ACC referee. He was the first rookie NFL referee since 1962 when Tommy Bell was hired as a referee straight out of the Southeastern Conference. (NFL officials normally spend at least their first season in another position than head referee.) In addition to promoting Allen, Torbert, and Wrolstad to the referee position, ten new officials were hired, including Shawn Hochuli, son of referee Ed Hochuli.

== Rule changes ==
The following rule changes were passed for the 2014 NFL season at the owners' meeting on March 26, 2014:

- Eliminating the referee's timeout after a sack (previously the clock did not stop for a sack only after the two-minute warning).
- Simplify spot of enforcement on defensive fouls committed behind the line of scrimmage to enforce from the previous spot instead of the end of the run or the spot of the foul.
- Raise the height of the goal post from 30 feet to 35 feet. The uprights had been 30 feet high since the 1974 NFL season.
- Extend the restriction on roll-up blocks to include such blocks from the side as well as from the back.
- "Dunking" the football through the goal post or crossbar (or any other means of using the goal post/crossbar as a prop in touchdown celebrations) is now considered unsportsmanlike conduct (15 yards). This rule was in response to New Orleans Saints tight end Jimmy Graham's tendency to dunk the football after scores. One of Graham's dunks bent the goal posts so much that the game was delayed several minutes in order for the stadium crew to make repairs. In addition, the aforementioned rule change to extend the goal posts will add extra weight, increasing the chances that it could collapse. This celebration was previously "grandfathered" as legal much like the Lambeau Leap.
- Expand replays to cover recovery of loose balls even if the play is blown dead. This was in response to San Francisco 49ers defensive player NaVorro Bowman's clear recovery of a loose ball and downing by contact in the 2013–14 NFL playoffs. The ball was given to the Seattle Seahawks after Seahawks running back Michael Robinson took it away from Bowman after Bowman was forced to let go of the ball due to a severe knee injury. Despite the indisputable video evidence of the recovery by Bowman, the play was not reviewable.
- Connecting the officiating command center to the field-to-booth communication relay, allowing the Referee to communicate with the command center during replay reviews. This was in response to some controversial replay reviews during the 2013 season, as well as league officials observing the NHL's command center. Unlike the NHL's replay system, however, NFL referees will still make the final decisions instead of the command center.
- Make on-field taunting and use of racial/sexual slurs subject to unsportsmanlike conduct penalties (15 yards).

The league has also instructed game officials to strictly enforce offensive pass interference, defensive holding, and illegal contact.

A proposal to move the line of scrimmage on the extra point try from the 2-yard line to the 25-yard line to increase their difficulty (a 43-yard try as opposed to the more easily makable 20 yards) was tabled (as was a counterproposal from the Cincinnati Bengals to move it up to the 1-yard line, to encourage more two-point conversions), but the owners approved an experiment of kicking extra points snapping from the 20-yard line (a 38-yard try) for the first two weeks of the preseason. 94.3% of PATs were made during the two-week experiment, as opposed to a 99.6% success rate all of last season.

=== New sideline technologies ===
As part of the league's deal with Microsoft, coaches will be equipped with Surface tablets to transmit images of plays taken from the top of the stadium to the sideline, eliminating the traditional practice of using printed photos and notebooks.

The seven NFL game officials will wear radio headsets to communicate with each other during games, similar to the systems used by referees at the FIFA World Cup and other higher levels of association football. With this technology, the officials will not have to move around the field to talk to each other, saving time.

=== Practice squads expanded ===
The league and the players' union agreed in August to some changes to the practice squad rules. Under the new rules, each team will be able to carry up to 10 players on their practice squad, up from eight. Practice squad eligibility was also expanded by increasing the number of games in a season a player must be on the squad in order for that season to count as one of the player's three seasons of eligibility from three games to six games. Finally, each practice squad may include two players who have accrued too much playing time to be eligible for the squad under the previous rules, though these players may have no more than two accrued seasons in the league. The new rules cover the 2014 and 2015 seasons, and will lapse in 2016 absent their extension.

=== New drug policy including HGH testing ===
A new drug policy that had been long delayed was agreed to by the league and the players' union in September. The revised policy includes testing for Human growth hormone (HGH) for the first time. Other significant changes include a higher limit for a positive test for marijuana as well as the reclassification of failed tests for amphetamines during the off-season as falling under the substance-abuse policy rather than the performance-enhancing drug (PED) policy. The changes were applied retroactively for suspensions handed out during the 2014 league year which meant that some players, including Wes Welker and Orlando Scandrick, who had failed tests due to amphetamine usage during the off-season were immediately reinstated despite being previously sentenced to four game bans.

== 2014 deaths ==
=== William Clay Ford ===
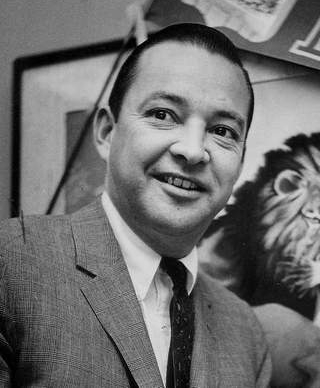
William Clay Ford Sr. in 1961

NFL team owners William Clay Ford Sr. and Ralph Wilson both died in March.

William Clay Ford Sr., the owner of the Detroit Lions, died March 9, two weeks shy of his 89th birthday. Ford purchased the Lions in 1963 and had been the team's president since 1961; at the time of his death, he was the second-longest tenured owner in the NFL, behind only Buffalo Bills owner Ralph Wilson. The team achieved only a single playoff win (in 1991) under Ford's ownership.

Ownership of the team passed to his widow, the former Martha Firestone. Ford's four children, including team vice-chairman William Clay Ford Jr., are also involved in running the team.

=== Ralph Wilson ===
Buffalo Bills owner Ralph Wilson died at age 95 on March 25. He was the founding owner of the franchise, which began in 1960 in the American Football League (AFL). Wilson played a central role in the negotiations between the AFL and NFL which eventually led to the AFL–NFL merger in 1970. He was the last remaining NFL owner among the Foolish Club, as the original eight AFL owners were named. Wilson was inducted into the Pro Football Hall of Fame in 2009. Coincidentally, both Wilson and Lions owner William Clay Ford Sr. died at their respective homes in Grosse Pointe Shores, Michigan, within three weeks of each other.

Ownership of the Bills passed to a trust headed by Wilson's widow, the former Mary McLean, and controlled by her and three other team officials. The trust put the team up for sale shortly after Wilson's death. The bidders for the team included payroll processing magnate Tom Golisano, natural gas tycoon Terrence Pegula, future President Donald Trump, a consortium including former Bills quarterback Jim Kelly and bond manager Jeffrey Gundlach, and a consortium of Jon Bon Jovi and the principals of Maple Leaf Sports and Entertainment. Despite a poor economy and attendance declines, the team was not in immediate jeopardy of relocating, mainly because of an ironclad stadium lease signed during Wilson's lifetime that effectively prevented the team from leaving until after the 2019 season and because potential Los Angeles-based interests had been intimidated away from buying the team. The Kelly/Gundlach and Golisano groups stepped aside when the Pegulas offered to buy the team, while Trump, who admittedly was not willing to bid as much as the other bidders, did endorse a smear campaign against the Bon Jovi/MLSE bid, run by political operative Michael R. Caputo, without focusing any opposition on the Pegulas. The team was eventually sold to Pegula for a reported price of 1.4 billion dollars.

In honor of Wilson, the Bills wore a patch bearing his initials on their jerseys throughout the 2014 season.

=== Malcolm Glazer ===
Tampa Bay Buccaneers' owner Malcolm Glazer died at age 85 on May 28. Glazer had owned the Buccaneers since 1995, a period which covers basically half of the team's history. The $192 million price Glazer paid set a record at the time for the price of a sports franchise. The franchise was in disarray when Glazer bought it after the death of founding owner Hugh Culverhouse. The Bucs had made the playoffs just three times in their 19 years under Culverhouse, while in the 19 seasons since Glazer took over, they made the playoffs seven times, including winning Super Bowl XXXVII in 2002.

Glazer's widow, Linda Glazer, and the Glazers' six children continue to own and operate the team.

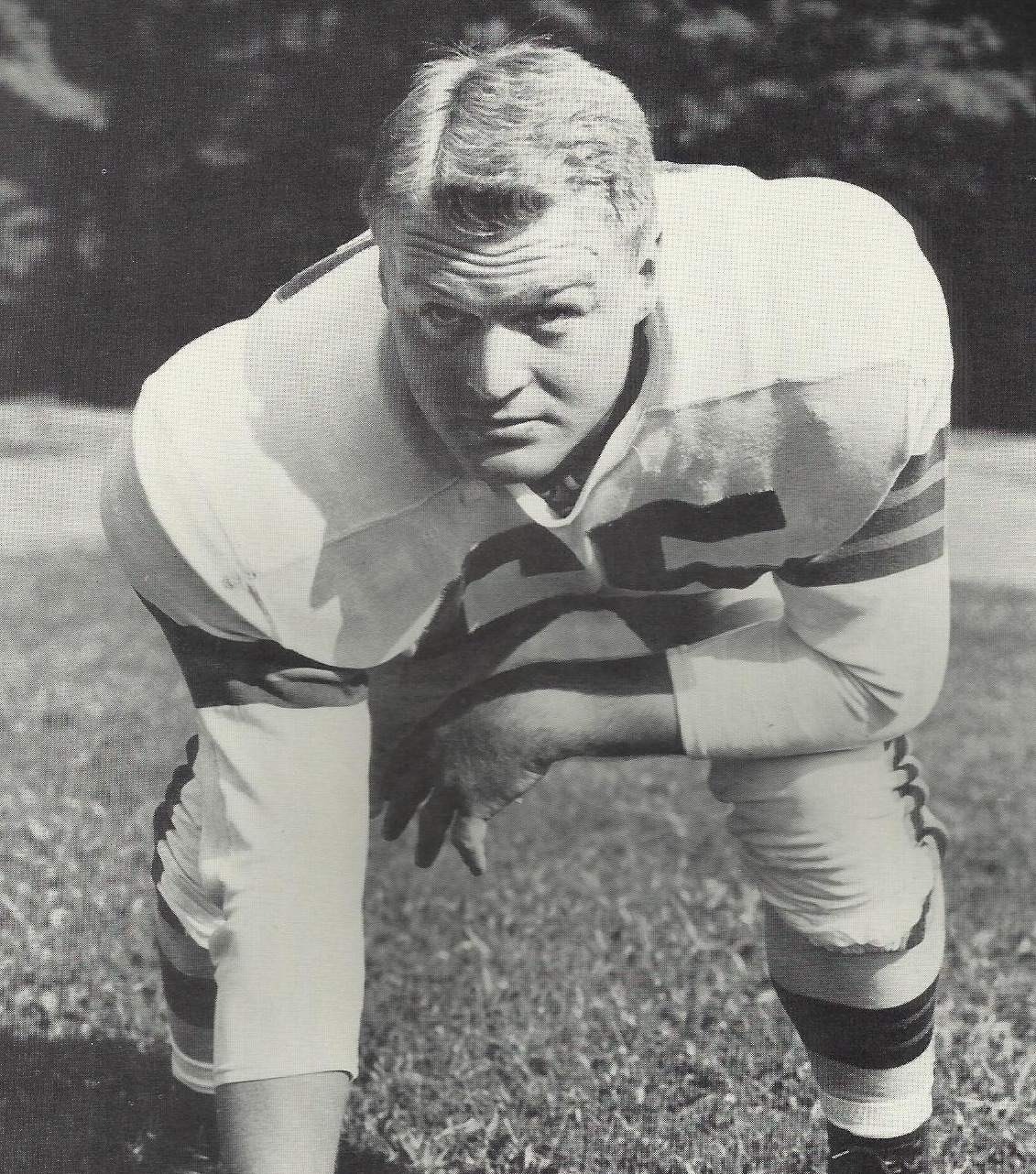
Noll in 1954

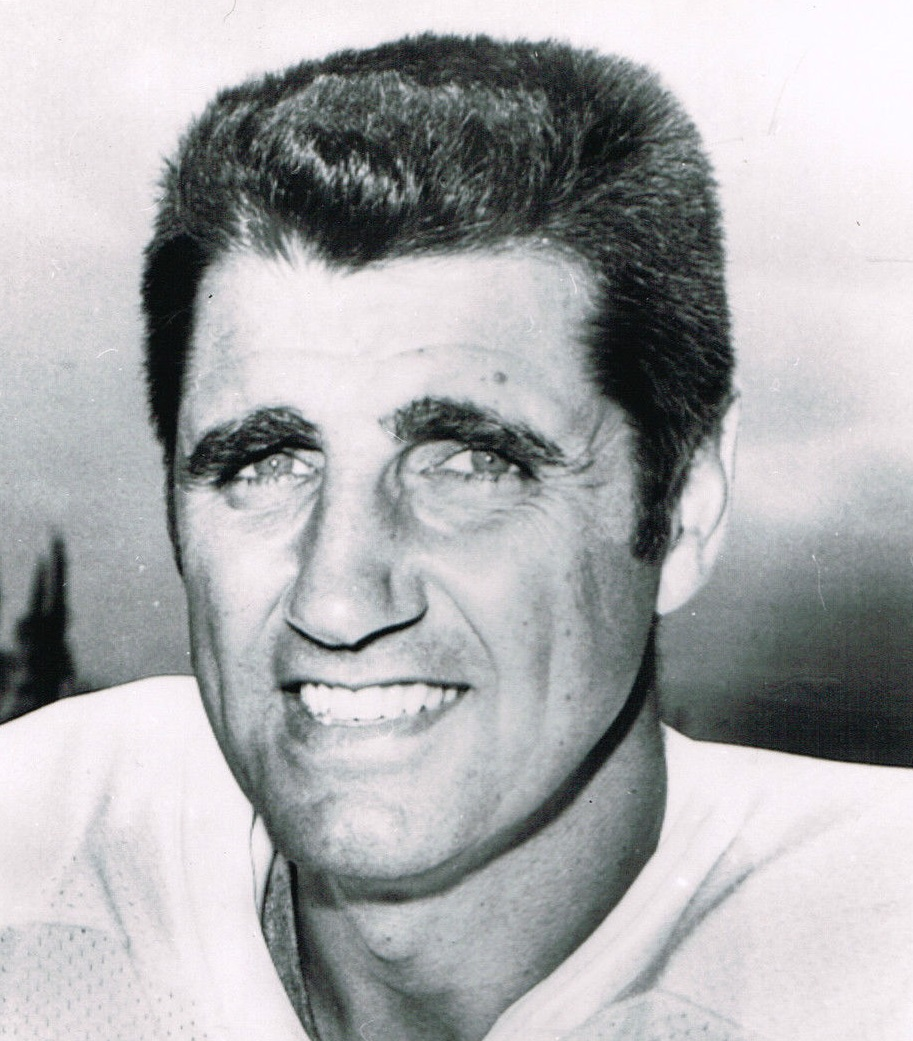
Morrall in 1976

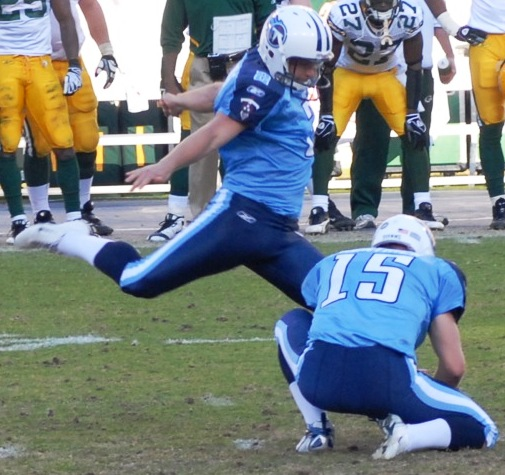
Rob Bironas

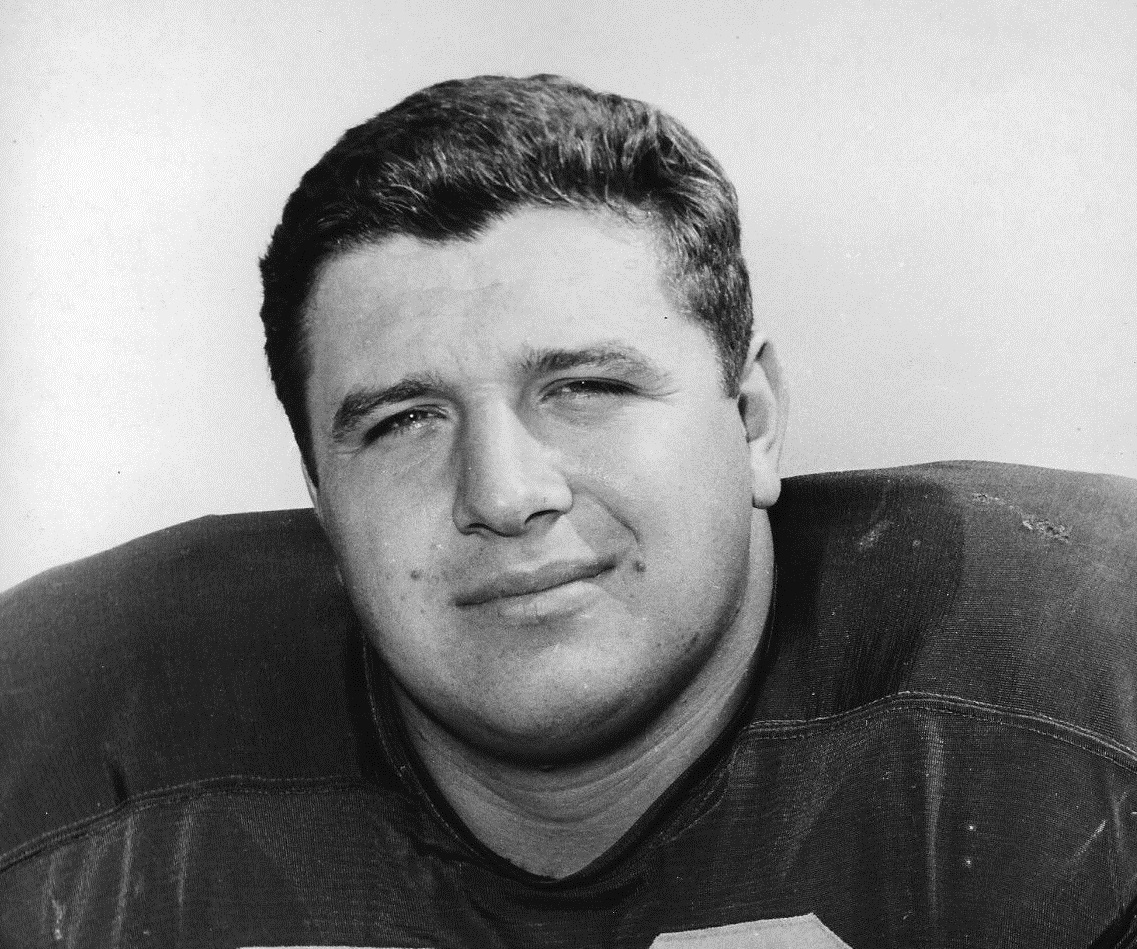
Don Chuy

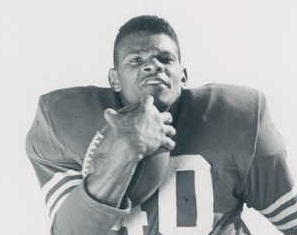
Abe Woodson

=== Chuck Noll ===
Former Pittsburgh Steelers head coach Chuck Noll died at age 82 on June 13. Noll was widely credited with building the Steelers' dynasty of the 1970s. He coached the team to four Super Bowl victories. When he was hired in 1969, the Steelers had not won a single title in nearly 40 years. He coached multiple Hall of Fame players including: Terry Bradshaw, "Mean" Joe Greene, Mike Webster, Jack Ham, Jack Lambert, Lynn Swann, John Stallworth, and Franco Harris. Noll was a member of the Pro Football Hall of Fame.

=== Earl Morrall ===
Earl Morrall died on April 25 at the age of 79. He had a 21-year NFL career and was a notable member of the 1972 Miami Dolphins team that is the only NFL squad to ever complete a perfect season. Morrall was the second player selected in the 1956 NFL draft and went on to play for six different NFL teams. He was named the league MVP in 1968 when he led the Baltimore Colts to a 13–1 record and the Super Bowl after replacing an injured Johnny Unitas. After joining the Dolphins in 1972 Morrall again proved to be a valuable back-up, replacing Bob Griese who suffered a broken ankle in the fifth game of the Dolphins immaculate season. Morrall started the final nine regular season games, before giving way to a healed Griese during the 1972–73 NFL playoffs. Morrall was named the Comeback Player of the Year by Pro Football Weekly for his contribution in 1972.

=== Other 2014 deaths ===
In addition to those mentioned above, the following people associated with the NFL (or AFL) died in 2014:

- Joe Abbey
- Mack Alston
- Ocie Austin
- Chris Banks
- Paul Barry
- Dave Behrman
- Art Best
- Dennis Biodrowski
- Rob Bironas
- Bill Boedeker
- Jim Boeke
- Don Bracken
- John Bramlett
- Carl Brettschneider
- Boyd Brown Jr.
- Les Bruckner
- Frank Budd
- Jim "Cannonball" Butler
- Jess Castete
- Ronnie Caveness
- Ernie Cheatham
- Don Chuy
- Dan Colchico
- Mo Collins
- Ted Connolly
- Jim Cox
- Hilton Crawford
- Dave Daniels
- Tony DiMidio
- Ray DiPierro
- Harley Dow
- Elbert Drungo
- Chris Dyko
- Charley Ellzey
- Fred Enke
- Bobby Epps
- Ledio Fanucchi
- Ken Farragut
- Jack Finlay
- Charlie Flowers
- Bill Frank
- Harry Gamble
- Goose Gonsoulin
- Hal Herring
- Donnie Humphrey
- Hal Hunter Sr.
- Allen Jacobs
- Jim Johnson (defensive back)
- Aki Jones
- Joe Katchik
- Edward Kelley
- Bob Kelly
- Larry Kelm
- Jim "Blackie" Kincaid
- Don King
- John Kompara
- John Kreamcheck
- Pete Ladygo
- Hank Lauricella
- Jeff Leiding
- Steve Little (former coach)
- Dave Lloyd
- Don Manoukian
- Toddrick McIntosh
- Leon McLaughlin
- Bob McNamara
- Eddie Meyer
- Tom Mikula
- Bob Mischak
- Sam Morley
- Dennit Morris
- John Morton (linebacker)
- Jim Myers
- Perry Moss
- Andy Natowich
- Robert Newhouse
- Anthero "Nick" Nicolau
- Reed Nilsen
- Tommy O'Connell
- Jack Parker Vaughn (former official)
- Rupert Pate
- Don Paul
- Charley Powell
- Mike Reed
- Tom Regner
- Pete Rodriguez
- Scott Ross
- Tim Rudnick
- Ken Russell
- Tom Saidock
- Jimmy Saxton
- Wayne Siegert
- Roy Simmons
- Bob Soleau, Gordy Soltau
- Ed Sprinkle
- Rebel Steiner
- Jim Stinnette
- Dave Strickland
- Jim Swink
- Deral Teteak
- Orlando Thomas
- Rodney Thomas
- Bobby Lee Thompson
- Fred "Fuzzy" Thurston
- Hal Turner
- T.J. Turner
- Al Vandeweghe
- Sam Venuto
- Ed Vereb
- John Weaver
- Todd Williams
- Dennis Wirgowski
- Abe Woodson
- Wilbur Young
- Walt Yowarsky

== Preseason ==
Training camps for the 2014 season were held in late July through August. Teams may start training camp no earlier than 15 days before the team's first scheduled preseason game.

Prior to the start of the regular season, each team played four preseason exhibition games. The preseason schedule got underway with the Pro Football Hall of Fame Game on Sunday evening, August 3. The Hall of Fame game is a traditional part of the annual Pro Football Hall of Fame induction weekend celebrating new Hall of Fame members. It was played at Fawcett Stadium which is located adjacent to the Hall of Fame building in Canton, Ohio. The game, which was televised in the U.S. on NBC, featured the New York Giants and Buffalo Bills, with the Giants winning 17–13. Continuing the recent trend of scheduling teams that are associated with former players being inducted into the Hall, the 2014 class included former Giants defensive end Michael Strahan and former Bills wide receiver Andre Reed. The others who were inducted into the Hall of Fame are linebacker Derrick Brooks, punter Ray Guy, defensive end Claude Humphrey, offensive tackle Walter Jones, and defensive back Aeneas Williams. The 65-game preseason schedule wrapped up on Thursday, August 28, a week before the start of the regular season.

== Regular season ==
The 2014 regular season featured 256 games played out over a seventeen-week schedule which began on the Thursday night following Labor Day. Each of the league's 32 teams played a 16-game schedule with one bye week for each team scheduled between weeks four and twelve. The slate featured seventeen games on Monday night including a doubleheader in the season's opening week. There were seventeen games played on Thursday, including the National Football League Kickoff game in prime time on September 4 and three games on Thanksgiving Day. The schedule also included two games played on Saturday, December 20, in the season's sixteenth week. The regular season concluded with a full slate of 16 games on Sunday, December 28, all of which, as it was since 2010, were intra-divisional matchups.

=== Scheduling formula ===
Under the NFL's current scheduling formula, each team plays each of the other three teams in their own division twice. In addition, a team plays against all four teams in one other division from each conference. The final two games on a team's schedule are against the two teams in the team's own conference in the divisions the team was not set to play who finished the previous season in the same rank in their division (e.g. the team which finished first in its division the previous season would play each other team in their conference that also finished first in its respective division). The pre-set division pairings for 2014 were as follows:

Intra-conference
AFC East vs. AFC West
AFC North vs. AFC South
NFC East vs. NFC West
NFC North vs. NFC South

Inter-conference
AFC East vs. NFC North
AFC North vs. NFC South
AFC South vs. NFC East
AFC West vs. NFC West

Highlights of the 2014 schedule include:

- International Series: Three games were played at Wembley Stadium in London, England in 2014. The Oakland Raiders lost to the Miami Dolphins 38–14 on September 28, the Atlanta Falcons lost to the Detroit Lions 22–21 on October 26, and the Jacksonville Jaguars lost to the Dallas Cowboys 31–17 on November 9, in the second of four consecutive appearances for the Jaguars in the International Series. CBS televised the Miami–Oakland game, while Fox televised the Dallas–Jacksonville and Detroit–Atlanta contests.
- Thanksgiving Day games: These games occurred on Thursday, November 27, 2014. The Detroit Lions hosted the Chicago Bears at 12:30 p.m. ET, and aired on CBS, while the Dallas Cowboys hosted the Philadelphia Eagles at 4:30 p.m. ET (Dallas last hosted Philadelphia on Thanksgiving 25 years prior in what became known as the Bounty Bowl), and aired on Fox. The prime-time NBC game, featured the San Francisco 49ers hosting the Seattle Seahawks in a rematch of the previous year's NFC Championship Game, was featured at 8:30 p.m. ET. For the first time ever, no AFC teams appeared on Thanksgiving.

On March 4, 2014, the Buffalo Bills' official radio flagship (WGR) confirmed that the Bills Toronto Series would not take place in 2014 and that the future of the series, which was otherwise scheduled to run through the 2017 season, was not yet certain. The series was formally terminated on December 3, 2014.

=== Changes to flex scheduling ===
The NFL introduced two major changes to the flexible scheduling procedure. First, the league would now be able to "cross-flex" games between CBS and Fox, enabling CBS to televise NFC away games (for the first time since 1993), and Fox to broadcast AFC away games (for the first time since 2011, and all-AFC matchups for the first time ever). The league could "cross-flex" some of these games before the start of, or during, the season. The first game affected by this "cross-flexing" change was the Week One contest between the Buffalo Bills and Chicago Bears at Soldier Field, which aired on Fox instead of CBS; all four of the Bills' interconference games (including their Week 5 game against the Detroit Lions at Ford Field) aired on Fox, and in Week 6, an all-AFC matchup, again involving the Bills (this time a division rivalry game against the New England Patriots) was moved to Fox, exacerbating financial problems at Buffalo's CBS affiliate WIVB-TV. An all-NFC matchup between the Carolina Panthers and Seattle Seahawks was given to CBS. The aforementioned Detroit-Chicago Thanksgiving game was also given to CBS instead of Fox.

On April 23, 2014, the league announced a second major change to the flexible scheduling procedure: games could be flexed into the NBC Sunday Night time slot as soon as Week 5. NBC was allowed to flex up to two games between Weeks 5 and 10, while the same rules applied for the remainder of the season.

=== In-season scheduling changes ===
The following games were moved by way of flexible scheduling, severe weather, or for other reasons:

- Week 6: The New England–Buffalo game was "cross-flexed" from CBS to Fox, while the Chicago–Atlanta game was moved from 1:00 p.m. to 4:25 p.m. ET (still on Fox).
- Week 8: The Seattle–Carolina game was "cross-flexed" from Fox to CBS, while the Houston–Tennessee game was "cross-flexed" from CBS to Fox, keeping their 1:00 p.m. ET kickoff times.
- Week 11: The Minnesota–Chicago game was "cross-flexed" from Fox to CBS, while the Philadelphia–Green Bay game was moved from 1:00 p.m. to 4:25 p.m. ET (still on Fox).
- Week 12: The New York Jets–Buffalo game was relocated from Sunday, November 23 at 1:00 p.m. ET to Ford Field in Detroit on Monday, November 24 at 7:00 p.m. ET due to the "Knife" lake-effect snowstorm that hit the Buffalo area the previous week. The game aired locally on WCBS-TV and WIVB-TV, respectively, while the previously scheduled Monday Night Football game between the Baltimore and New Orleans aired as scheduled.
- Week 14: The Indianapolis–Cleveland game was "cross-flexed" from CBS to Fox, keeping the same 1:00 p.m. ET kickoff time.
- Week 15: The Cincinnati–Cleveland game was "cross-flexed" from CBS to Fox, while the Minnesota–Detroit game was moved from 1:00 p.m. to 4:25 p.m. ET (still on Fox).
- Week 16: On November 30, the league announced the final start times and networks for the two Saturday, December 20 games: the Philadelphia–Washington game was played at 4:25 p.m. ET and aired on NFL Network, and the San Diego–San Francisco game was held at 8:25 p.m. ET and was broadcast on CBS.
- Week 17:
  - The Cincinnati–Pittsburgh game, originally scheduled for 1 p.m. ET on CBS, was selected as the final NBC Sunday Night Football game, which decided the AFC North champion.
  - The Jacksonville–Houston game, originally scheduled for 1 p.m. ET on CBS, was "cross-flexed" to Fox (keeping the same kickoff time).
  - The Carolina–Atlanta game, which decided the NFC South champion, originally scheduled for 1 p.m. ET on Fox, was "cross-flexed" to 4:25 p.m. ET on CBS.
  - The Detroit–Green Bay game, which decided the NFC North champion, originally scheduled for 1 p.m. ET on Fox, was moved to 4:25 p.m. ET (still on Fox).

== Regular season standings ==
=== Division ===
AFC East
	W	L	T	PCT	DIV	CONF	PF	PA	STK
^{(1)} New England Patriots	12	4	0	.750	4–2	9–3	468	313	L1
Buffalo Bills	9	7	0	.563	4–2	5–7	343	289	W1
Miami Dolphins	8	8	0	.500	3–3	6–6	388	373	L1
New York Jets	4	12	0	.250	1–5	4–8	283	401	W1

AFC North
	W	L	T	PCT	DIV	CONF	PF	PA	STK
^{(3)} Pittsburgh Steelers	11	5	0	.688	4–2	9–3	436	368	W4
^{(5)} Cincinnati Bengals	10	5	1	.656	3–3	7–5	365	344	L1
^{(6)} Baltimore Ravens	10	6	0	.625	3–3	6–6	409	302	W1
Cleveland Browns	7	9	0	.438	2–4	4–8	299	337	L5

AFC South
	W	L	T	PCT	DIV	CONF	PF	PA	STK
^{(4)} Indianapolis Colts	11	5	0	.688	6–0	9–3	458	369	W1
Houston Texans	9	7	0	.563	4–2	8–4	372	307	W2
Jacksonville Jaguars	3	13	0	.188	1–5	2–10	249	412	L1
Tennessee Titans	2	14	0	.125	1–5	2–10	254	438	L10

AFC West
	W	L	T	PCT	DIV	CONF	PF	PA	STK
^{(2)} Denver Broncos	12	4	0	.750	6–0	10–2	482	354	W1
Kansas City Chiefs (Note: Kansas City is ranked ahead of San Diego based on head-to-head sweep (Week 7, 23–20; Week 17, 19–7).)	9	7	0	.563	3–3	7–5	353	281	W1
San Diego Chargers	9	7	0	.563	2–4	6–6	348	348	L1
Oakland Raiders	3	13	0	.188	1–5	2–10	253	452	L1

NFC East
	W	L	T	PCT	DIV	CONF	PF	PA	STK
^{(3)} Dallas Cowboys	12	4	0	.750	4–2	8–4	467	352	W4
Philadelphia Eagles	10	6	0	.625	4–2	6–6	474	400	W1
New York Giants	6	10	0	.375	2–4	4–8	380	400	L1
Washington Redskins	4	12	0	.250	2–4	2–10	301	438	L1

NFC North
	W	L	T	PCT	DIV	CONF	PF	PA	STK
^{(2)} Green Bay Packers	12	4	0	.750	5–1	9–3	486	348	W2
^{(6)} Detroit Lions	11	5	0	.688	5–1	9–3	321	282	L1
Minnesota Vikings	7	9	0	.438	1–5	6–6	325	343	W1
Chicago Bears	5	11	0	.313	1–5	4–8	319	442	L5

NFC South
	W	L	T	PCT	DIV	CONF	PF	PA	STK
^{(4)} Carolina Panthers	7	8	1	.469	4–2	6–6	339	374	W4
New Orleans Saints	7	9	0	.438	3–3	6–6	401	424	W1
Atlanta Falcons	6	10	0	.375	5–1	6–6	381	417	L1
Tampa Bay Buccaneers	2	14	0	.125	0–6	1–11	277	410	L6

NFC West
	W	L	T	PCT	DIV	CONF	PF	PA	STK
^{(1)} Seattle Seahawks	12	4	0	.750	5–1	10–2	394	254	W6
^{(5)} Arizona Cardinals	11	5	0	.688	3–3	8–4	310	299	L2
San Francisco 49ers	8	8	0	.500	2–4	7–5	306	340	W1
St. Louis Rams	6	10	0	.375	2–4	4–8	324	354	L3

=== Conference ===
AFC
#	Team	Division	W	L	T	PCT	DIV	CONF	SOS	SOV	STK
Division leaders
1 (Note: New England defeated Denver head-to-head (Week 9, 43–21).)	New England Patriots	East	12	4	0	.750	4–2	9–3	.514	.487	L1
2	Denver Broncos	West	12	4	0	.750	6–0	10–2	.521	.484	W1
3 (Note: Pittsburgh defeated Indianapolis head-to-head (Week 8, 51–34).)	Pittsburgh Steelers	North	11	5	0	.688	4–2	9–3	.451	.486	W4
4	Indianapolis Colts	South	11	5	0	.688	6–0	9–3	.479	.372	W1
Wild Cards
5	Cincinnati Bengals	North	10	5	1	.656	3–3	7–5	.498	.425	L1
6	Baltimore Ravens	North	10	6	0	.625	3–3	6–6	.475	.378	W1
Did not qualify for the postseason
7 (Note: Kansas City finished ahead of San Diego in the AFC West based on head-to-head sweep (Week 7, 23–20; Week 17, 19–7). Houston finished ahead of Kansas City and Buffalo based on conference record. Kansas City finished ahead of Buffalo based on head-to-head victory (Week 10, 17–13). San Diego finished ahead of Buffalo based on head-to-head victory (Week 3, 22–10).)	Houston Texans	South	9	7	0	.563	4–2	8–4	.447	.299	W2
8	Kansas City Chiefs	West	9	7	0	.563	3–3	7–5	.512	.500	W1
9	San Diego Chargers	West	9	7	0	.563	2–4	6–6	.512	.403	L1
10	Buffalo Bills	East	9	7	0	.563	4–2	5–7	.516	.486	W1
11	Miami Dolphins	East	8	8	0	.500	3–3	6–6	.512	.406	L1
12	Cleveland Browns	North	7	9	0	.438	2–4	4–8	.479	.371	L5
13	New York Jets	East	4	12	0	.250	1–5	4–8	.543	.375	W1
14 (Note: Jacksonville finished ahead of Oakland based on record vs. common opponents (1–4 to 0–5).)	Jacksonville Jaguars	South	3	13	0	.188	1–5	2–10	.514	.313	L1
15	Oakland Raiders	West	3	13	0	.188	1–5	2–10	.570	.542	L1
16	Tennessee Titans	South	2	14	0	.125	1–5	2–10	.506	.375	L10
Tiebreakers (Note: When breaking ties for three or more teams under the NFL's rules, they are first broken within divisions, then comparing only the highest ranked remaining team from each division.)

NFC
#	Team	Division	W	L	T	PCT	DIV	CONF	SOS	SOV	STK
Division leaders
1 (Note: Seattle, Green Bay and Dallas were ranked in seeds 1–3 based on conference record.)	Seattle Seahawks	West	12	4	0	.750	5–1	10–2	.525	.513	W6
2	Green Bay Packers	North	12	4	0	.750	5–1	9–3	.482	.440	W2
3	Dallas Cowboys	East	12	4	0	.750	4–2	8–4	.445	.422	W4
4	Carolina Panthers	South	7	8	1	.469	4–2	6–6	.490	.357	W4
Wild Cards
5 (Note: Arizona defeated Detroit head-to-head (Week 11, 14–6).)	Arizona Cardinals	West	11	5	0	.688	3–3	8–4	.523	.477	L2
6	Detroit Lions	North	11	5	0	.688	5–1	9–3	.471	.392	L1
Did not qualify for the postseason
7	Philadelphia Eagles	East	10	6	0	.625	4–2	6–6	.490	.416	W1
8	San Francisco 49ers	West	8	8	0	.500	2–4	7–5	.527	.508	W1
9 (Note: New Orleans defeated Minnesota head-to-head (Week 3, 20–9).)	New Orleans Saints	South	7	9	0	.438	3–3	6–6	.486	.415	W1
10	Minnesota Vikings	North	7	9	0	.438	1–5	6–6	.475	.308	W1
11 (Note: The NY Giants defeated both Atlanta and St. Louis head-to-head (Atlanta: Week 5, 30–20; St. Louis: Week 16, 37–27), while Atlanta finished ahead of St. Louis based on conference record.)	New York Giants	East	6	10	0	.375	2–4	4–8	.512	.323	L1
12	Atlanta Falcons	South	6	10	0	.375	5–1	6–6	.482	.380	L1
13	St. Louis Rams	West	6	10	0	.375	2–4	4–8	.531	.427	L3
14	Chicago Bears	North	5	11	0	.313	1–5	4–8	.529	.338	L5
15	Washington Redskins	East	4	12	0	.250	2–4	2–10	.496	.422	L1
16	Tampa Bay Buccaneers	South	2	14	0	.125	0–6	1–11	.486	.469	L6
Tiebreakers (Note: When breaking ties for three or more teams under the NFL's rules, they are first broken within divisions, then comparing only the highest-ranked remaining team from each division.)

== Postseason ==
The wild card round was played on January 3–4, 2015. Divisional round games were played on January 10–11. Conference Championship Games were played on January 18 with the NFC Championship Game at 3:00 pm EST on Fox and the AFC Championship Game following at 6:30 pm EST on CBS.

=== Super Bowl XLIX ===
Super Bowl XLIX, the 49th contesting of the Super Bowl, decided the 2014 NFL champion on February 1, 2015, with the New England Patriots defeating the defending Super Bowl XLVIII champions Seattle Seahawks, who were looking to repeat, by a score of 28–24. With a controversial play call by Seattle's head coach, Pete Carroll, they decided to try to pass the ball in for a touchdown at the 1 yard line, and the ball was intercepted by rookie cornerback Malcolm Butler. Thus, New England sealed the win. The game took place at University of Phoenix Stadium in Glendale, Arizona. It was televised in the U.S. by NBC with kickoff around 6:30 p.m. EST.

=== Playoffs bracket ===
Jan 4 – Lucas Oil Stadium	Jan 11 – Sports Authority Field at Mile High
5	Cincinnati	10
4	Indianapolis	24
4	Indianapolis	26	Jan 18 – Gillette Stadium
2	Denver	13
AFC
Jan 3 – Heinz Field	4	Indianapolis	7
Jan 10 – Gillette Stadium
1	New England	45
6	Baltimore	30	AFC Championship
6	Baltimore	31
3	Pittsburgh	17	Feb 1 – University of Phoenix Stadium
1	New England	35
Wild-card round
Divisional round
Jan 4 – AT&T Stadium	A1	New England	28
Jan 11 – Lambeau Field
N1	Seattle	24
6	Detroit	20	Super Bowl XLIX
3	Dallas	21
3	Dallas	24	Jan 18 – CenturyLink Field
2	Green Bay	26
NFC
Jan 3 – Bank of America Stadium	2	Green Bay	22
Jan 10 – CenturyLink Field
1	Seattle	28*
5	Arizona	16	NFC Championship
4	Carolina	17
4	Carolina	27
1	Seattle	31

* Indicates overtime victory

== Pro Bowl ==
The Pro Bowl is the league's all-star game. On April 9, 2014, the NFL announced that the 2015 Pro Bowl would be played the week prior to the Super Bowl at University of Phoenix Stadium in Glendale, Arizona. It was broadcast in the U.S. by ESPN on Sunday, January 25, 2015. The draft format that debuted in the 2014 Pro Bowl continued with two former players, Cris Carter and Michael Irvin, drafting their players from a select list voted by the country, and without regard to league conference. Cleveland Browns CB Joe Haden was named a captain of one of the Pro Bowl rosters alongside RB DeMarco Murray of Dallas on January 15. DE J. J. Watt of Houston and WR Antonio Brown of Pittsburgh were named opposite roster captains.

== Notable events ==
External image
- 2014 NFL Season Review Infographic, Dish Network, retrieved February 12, 2015

Some NFL-related events that made headlines throughout 2014 include:

=== Michael Sam becomes first openly gay player drafted by NFL ===
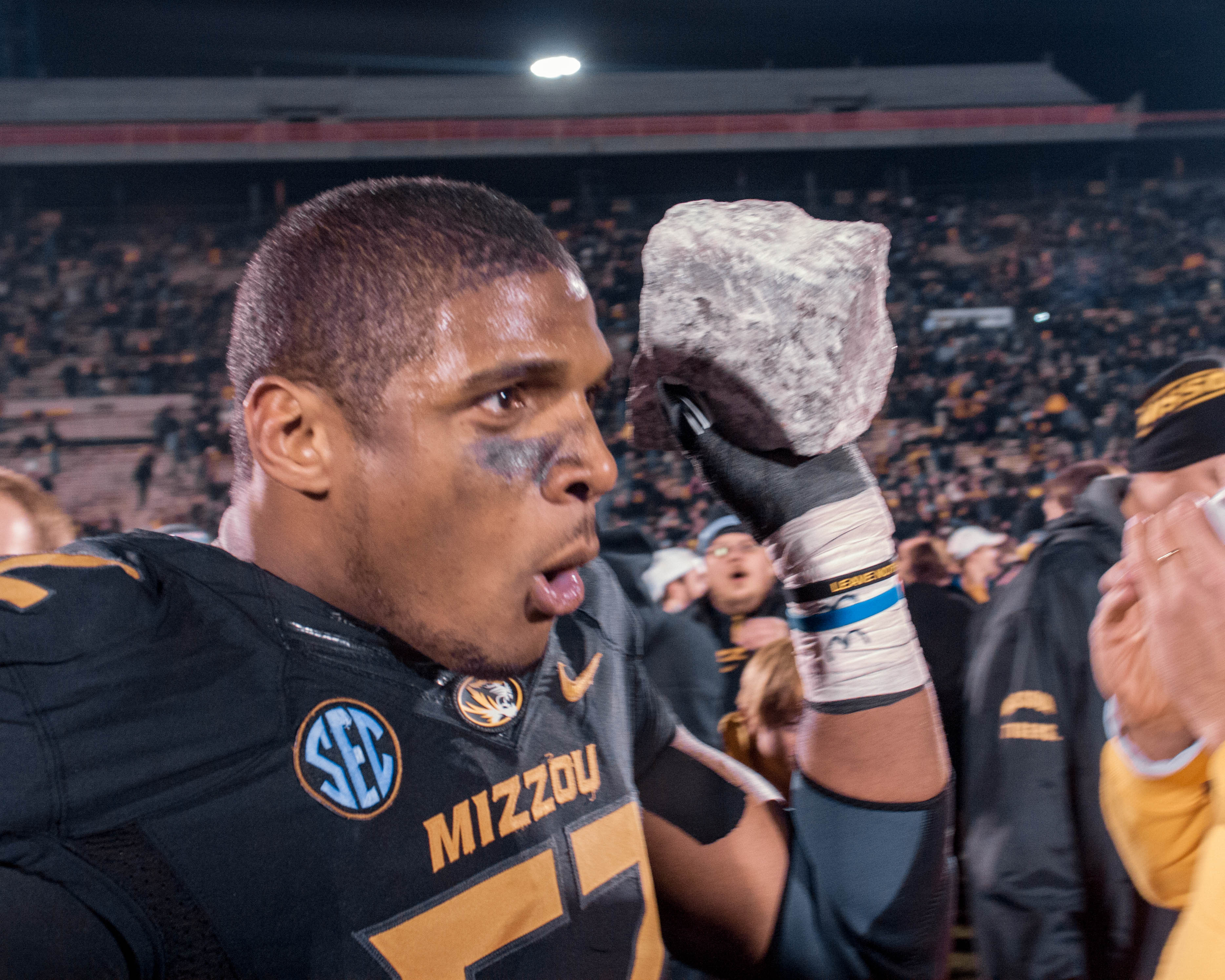
Michael Sam

Michael Sam, an All-America defensive lineman from Missouri who was named the SEC Defensive Player of the Year in 2013, announced in February that he is gay. Sam was selected by the St. Louis Rams in the seventh round of the 2014 draft with the 249th overall selection. He became the first openly gay draftee to be selected in the NFL draft and if he made an NFL roster, he would become the first openly gay player in the NFL.

Sam, the Rams and the NFL were publicly congratulated upon Sam's selection by U.S. president Barack Obama who called Sam's selection "an important step forward today in our Nation's journey." However, Sam stated after the draft that he felt he "should have gone in the top three rounds easily" and there was speculation that his announcement of his sexuality caused him to fall in the draft. Sam was the first ever SEC Defensive Player of the Year to not be selected in the first round of the draft. On the other hand, Sam's performance at the NFL Scouting Combine was widely judged as "mediocre" and at least one draft analyst assessed his odds of making an NFL roster as only "slightly better than average".

ESPN aired Sam's reaction to being drafted which included an embrace and celebratory kiss with his partner. Miami Dolphins safety Don Jones tweeted a negative reaction to the display, which caused the Dolphins to fine him and ban him from participation in off-season team activities until he undergoes sensitivity training.

On August 30, Sam was cut by the Rams a few days before the regular season was to start. On September 3, the Dallas Cowboys added Sam to their practice squad; he was released from the practice squad on October 21.

=== Lawsuits by NFL cheerleaders ===
During the offseason, a major headline was many current and former cheerleaders filing lawsuits against their respective NFL teams for unfair labor practices. Members of the Buffalo Jills, Cincinnati Ben–Gals, Jets Flight Crew, Oakland Raiderettes, and Tampa Bay Buccaneers Cheerleaders all filed lawsuits against their respective teams (or, in the case of the Jills, the non-profit organization that runs the Jills) for violating their respective state laws for labor practices, stating that they were required to meet certain appearance standards in both weight and make-up (at the expense of the cheerleaders) and attend mandatory unpaid practices, while being paid very little for each game, and in some cases, only receiving a lump sum payment after the season. One lawsuit by a Raiderette, who had a young child at home and was prompted by her husband to initiate the lawsuit, was ruled as a seasonal job in federal court and thus not subject to minimum wage laws, but still was pending in a California state court and that state's more stringent labor laws. Most controversial was the Jills' "Jiggle Test" that became public knowledge. The Jills suspended operations indefinitely in response to the lawsuit. It has been speculated that all NFL teams might drop their cheerleading squads in response to the lawsuits instead of paying their squads accordingly despite having the financial means to do so, though the Cleveland Browns are considering adding cheerleaders to the team.

=== Washington Redskins name controversy ===
On June 18, 2014, the United States Patent and Trademark Office, in a 2–1 decision, invalidated some of the trademark protections of the Washington Redskins, stating that the use of the team name "Redskins" constituted an ethnic slur. The Redskins are not required to change their name. However, if the decision is upheld on appeal (the team intends to appeal and has no intention of changing the team name), they will not be able to prevent counterfeiters from manufacturing certain knockoff Redskins' apparel.

With the Minnesota Vikings playing their first of two consecutive seasons at the University of Minnesota's TCF Bank Stadium (see below), the university asked the Vikings to keep the Washington team's name from being used in printed materials or uttered by the game announcer at the stadium. The college also requested that the Redskins wear their throwback jerseys without the team name and logo when they visited the Vikings on November 2. University officials said that the use of the Redskins name at their stadium violates the institution's affirmative action, diversity and equal opportunity policy. Lester Bagley, the Vikings' executive vice president of public affairs, said that the team is still deciding how it will handle the college's request.

=== Broncos' owner Pat Bowlen relinquishes control of team ===
On July 23, Pat Bowlen, the Denver Broncos' owner since 1984, relinquished control of the team due to his battle with Alzheimer's disease. Bowlen had been privately battling the disease since 2009 after experiencing short-term memory loss, and had since taken a reduced role with the team, resulting in team president Joe Ellis and executive vice president/general manager John Elway making team decisions. Ellis and Elway assumed full control of the team, though Bowlen's long-term plan was for one of his seven children to run the team in the future, preventing the Broncos from being put up for sale.

=== Colts' owner Jim Irsay guilty of OWI; suspended 6 games ===
Indianapolis Colts owner Jim Irsay was arrested on March 16 near his home in Carmel, Indiana, on suspicion of driving under the influence (DUI) after failing field sobriety tests. A search of Irsay's vehicle revealed "numerous prescription medication bottles containing pills" as well as almost $30,000 in cash. Preliminary charges of DUI and four counts of possession of a controlled substance were filed against Irsay, who was jailed overnight. Irsay entered a rehabilitation facility shortly after his release from jail. Irsay had undergone treatment for prescription drug addiction previously in the early 2000s. Irsay returned to the Colts shortly before the draft in May.

In late May, Irsay was charged with two misdemeanor counts in the incident: operating a vehicle while intoxicated and operating a vehicle with a controlled substance in the body. Prosecutors allege Irsay was under the influence of oxycodone or hydrocodone, both of which are prescription opioid narcotic pain medications.

Irsay pleaded guilty on September 2 to one count of operating a vehicle while intoxicated (OWI), which is a Class C misdemeanor in Indiana. He was sentenced to one year of probation during which he is forbidden from consuming or possessing alcohol and his driving privileges were revoked for a period of one year and 40 days. He will be subject to random drug testing as a condition of his probation. In addition, the judge stipulated that any subsequent OWI charge in a five-year period will be treated as a felony. The NFL banned Irsay from any contact with his team for six games and also levied a fine of $500,000. He was also forbidden from doing any media interviews or making comments related to the team on social media during the suspension. It was expected that Irsay's daughter, Carlie Irsay-Gordon, would assume control of the team during his absence.

=== Ray Rice domestic violence suspension ===
On February 15, 2014, Baltimore Ravens running back Ray Rice and his fiancée Janay Palmer were both arrested for assault after a physical altercation that took place at Revel Casino in Atlantic City, New Jersey. Celebrity news website TMZ posted a video of Rice dragging Palmer's body out of an elevator at the casino. The Ravens issued a statement following TMZ's release of the video, calling Rice's domestic violence arrest a "serious matter".

On March 27, 2014, a grand jury indicted Rice on charges of third-degree aggravated assault, which could carry a jail sentence of three to five years in prison and a fine of up to $15,000. Charges against Palmer were dropped. Rice and Palmer were married the day after his indictment. Rice pleaded guilty to one count of third degree aggravated assault and was accepted into a pretrial intervention program for first-time offenders on May 20. Under the terms of the plea deal, the charges would be dropped and expunged from Rice's record if he meets the conditions imposed by the judge for the next 12 months.

Rice was suspended by the NFL for the first two games of the 2014 NFL season on July 25. On September 8, TMZ released footage from a camera inside the elevator in which the assault took place. The video appears to show Rice punching Palmer in the face causing Palmer to immediately fall to the ground, perhaps striking her head on the elevator's handrail on the way to the floor, and leaving her motionless. Within hours of the video's release, the Baltimore Ravens terminated Rice's contract. Shortly thereafter, Goodell announced that Rice had been suspended from the league indefinitely.

Rice, along with the players' union, appealed the indefinite suspension on the grounds that a player cannot be disciplined twice for the same incident. The union requested that Goodell recuse himself from hearing the appeal (as he normally would under the league's personal conduct policy) since he will be a witness in the proceedings.

In late November, Rice was reinstated. It's reported that there are four teams looking into picking up Rice for the 2015 season. Two of those teams have been identified as the New Orleans Saints and Indianapolis Colts.

=== New policy on domestic violence instituted by league ===
As a result of widespread criticism of the two-game suspension handed down in the Ray Rice case, which was considered too lenient by many commentators, the NFL announced a new policy on dealing with domestic violence on August 28. Under the new policy the first offense of domestic violence would be punishable by a minimum six-game suspension without pay; a second offense would result in a "lifetime" ban from the league. These rules will apply to all league personnel, including executives and owners, not just players. A person who receives a "lifetime" ban would be eligible to petition the league for reinstatement after one year. The penalty for the first offense could be increased by a number of factors including a previous incident prior to joining the league, the use of a weapon, an act committed against a pregnant woman and the presence of a child.

=== Reaction to the new domestic violence policy ===
According to an Associated Press article on ESPN, the players' union has questioned why the NFL's domestic violence training and education program "treats all players as perpetrators". In a memo sent to the NFL Players Association members on Thursday by Executive Director DeMaurice Smith and obtained Friday by the Associated Press, the union also said the plan, "doesn't build a positive consensus to warning signs." Smith and union special counsel Teri Patterson described two meetings this month with the league in which an NFLPA commission was briefed on the league's approach to educating players, coaches, executives, owners and NFL personnel about domestic violence. He wrote that a "good overview of domestic violence, sexual assault and child abuse" was presented. But "it did not address larger issues of violence in and outside of the home".

The NFL said of the "perpetrators" claim: "Nothing could be further from the truth. The presentation expressly recognizes that people in the NFL are often falsely portrayed and that the actions of a few damage the reputations of many." "What the program teaches is that everyone can and should be part of the solution," the league statement said. The union memo also said the "NFL's presentation doesn't focus on follow-ups and providing continuous resources at the clubs to address potentially violent situations as well as preventing them." The NFL's educational program was shown to the AP on Oct. 7, and it included information from a memo sent to the 32 clubs on Sept. 18 that pointed out local resources available to all team personnel and their families. That document indicated a plan was in place to provide those resources and follow-ups for those who need it. The union memo to the players also said the NFL presentation "doesn't include any psychological information about the type of behavior that could lead to acts of violence or warning signs of negative behavior, but instead seemed to focus almost entirely on what happens after a violent incident has been committed."

The league's plan calls for experts who work in the psychological space to offer a research perspective of societal issues, recognized that these are intimate crimes that impact people in many ways. The program calls for each club to have such experts available to the teams, or what NFL calls "the entire club family". That can include a clinician, human resource workers, player engagement executives, security personnel and a mental health professional who works with the club. The union added that although the league indicated that the trainers for this educational program will be experts, the NFL did not list any specific names, titles or relevant backgrounds of the people they intend to utilize for the training. Previously, the NFL announced an advisory group that includes authorities in the domestic violence area such as Tony Porter, Beth E. Richie, Rita Smith, Jane Randel and Lisa Friel. Another NFLPA observation was: "Too much reliance was placed on using former players to participate in the training. While one former players possess the right qualifications and experience to train personnel on these issues, the league's inability to articulate who these players are raises concerns that call into question the effectiveness of the training." Many of the player ambassadors, as the NFL calls them, have personal testimonies around these issues and might be helpful, but they would not deliver the education program. The union added: "The league stated that at each presentation, they will distribute information on suggested local (team city/state specific) resources for domestic violence and sexual assault prevention specialists, licensed club mental health clinicians, club human resource directors and director of Player Engagement.

The NFLPA commission members recommended that a broader net of resources be included, such as faith-based counselors and male-focused community organizations, etc. The NFL did not provide any explanation as to why one resource was chosen over another or how those resources would be specifically integrated into the workplace, if at all." In response to the union memo, the NFL said: "We were pleased to meet with the union and are working to incorporate their suggestions into the presentations is the start of a process of education that will continue in future years."

=== Adrian Peterson child abuse arrest and benched ===
Minnesota Vikings running back Adrian Peterson was indicted by a Houston grand jury on a felony charge of injury to a child on September 12. The charge stemmed from a beating with a tree branch, or switch, which Peterson allegedly administered to his 4-year-old son as a disciplinary measure. Peterson turned himself in for arrest following the indictment.

The Vikings announced following the arrest that Peterson would be deactivated and would not play in the team's game that weekend. The following Monday the team announced that Peterson would be allowed to rejoin the team. The team reversed direction two days later and placed Peterson on the inactive list pending resolution of the charges.

=== Greg Hardy found guilty of domestic violence; placed on leave ===
Carolina Panthers defensive end Greg Hardy was arrested on charges of domestic violence after an altercation with his girlfriend which took place on May 13. In July, Hardy was found guilty of assaulting a female and communicating threats and sentenced to 18 months of probation in a trial before a district judge. Hardy immediately requested a trial by jury which under North Carolina's legal system means that the terms of the sentencing are put on hold pending the jury trial.

Because the legal process had not yet played out, Hardy was not disciplined immediately by either the league or the Panthers and he was allowed to play in the team's first game. However, following the outcry surrounding the Ray Rice and Adrian Peterson situations, Hardy was de-activated for the Panther's second game and was subsequently placed on the inactive list until the charges are adjudicated. Hardy continued to get paid, but was not allowed to have any contact with the Panthers organization.

=== Possible franchise relocations ===
==== Buffalo Bills ====
In July 2014 it was reported that Jon Bon Jovi and the principals of Maple Leaf Sports & Entertainment (a consortium between Bills Toronto Series lessee Edward Rogers III and Larry Tanenbaum) had joined forces as equal partners to bid on the Buffalo Bills, with Bon Jovi the proposed controlling owner. It was also reported that the group had conducted a feasibility study in early 2013 on the construction of an NFL stadium in Toronto. Following protests by Buffalo area fans against the Toronto group, including radio stations banning Bon Jovi's music, Bon Jovi wrote a public letter to Bills fans saying that the group's objective was to "make the Bills successful in Buffalo" and committing to work with all levels of government "to identify the best possible site in the Buffalo area for a new stadium", though it noticeably did not promise to keep the team in Buffalo. The group claimed it had plans to meet with developers in the Buffalo region to discuss the construction of a new stadium. However, there was widespread skepticism about the sincerity of the group's pledge to keep the team in Buffalo, with a sports franchise relocation expert quoted as saying that if they did intend to move the club, "I would suggest never saying that publicly" due to the legal implications of selling the team to a group planning on relocating it.

The Toronto group was one of four known to have submitted a preliminary bid for the franchise. The other groups, which intend to keep the club in Buffalo, were: eventual winner Terrence Pegula, owner of the Buffalo Sabres; Donald Trump, who formerly owned the New Jersey Generals; and Tom Golisano, former owner of the Buffalo Sabres. Trump described his chances of being the successful bidder as "very, very unlikely because I'm not going to do something totally stupid." Other Canadians who explored purchasing the team include John Bitove, who was co-founder the Toronto Raptors, and the family of Francesco Aquilini, who owns the Vancouver Canucks, though it is unknown if they intended to move the team. Though Tanenbaum and Rogers had significant wealth, it had been reported that the Toronto group's bid was limited by Bon Jovi's resources and his desire to be the controlling partner; NFL regulations require the controlling partner to have a 30% equity stake. Los Angeles-based interests largely stayed away from the Bills, citing concerns over the stadium's lease and the fear that politicians will place intense scrutiny on any person who attempts to move the Bills out of Buffalo; multibillionaire Eli Broad declined to place a bid on the team for those reasons.

The sale was completed on September 9, to the Pegulas for a reported amount of 1.4 billion dollars which made the Bills purchase the most expensive in league history. The sale was done in time for the Pegulas to be unanimously approved at the NFL's owners meeting on October 6–8. Terry Pegula, owns the Buffalo Sabres and development projects in the Buffalo area. The Pegulas intend to keep the team in Western New York for the long term.

Any possible relocation had one of the other bidders won (or if Pegula resells the team to anyone in the future) could not happen under the terms of the Bills' current lease on Ralph Wilson Stadium until the end of the 2019 season and would have, at least on paper, required league endorsement (whether the league could, in and of itself, stop a relocation is unclear; Al Davis moved the Oakland Raiders to Los Angeles in 1982 against the league's wishes). And a relocation fee, which had been speculated to be $100–$200 million, could be charged by the NFL, though this could be offset by an increase in franchise value in a larger market. Goodell has said the two votes would be held separately. Of the owners who made their position known, Jerry Jones was believed to have been in favor of the Bills moving to Toronto, while John Mara, Robert Wood Johnson IV, the Green Bay Packers Board of Directors, and Shahid Khan indicated they would have most likely opposed moving the team.

==== Oakland Raiders ====
On July 29, 2014, reports surfaced that the Oakland Raiders were considering relocating to San Antonio in 2015 after owner Mark Davis met with San Antonio civic leaders the week before at the encouragement of former Raider Cliff Branch, which Davis was in town to visit for a local ceremony for Branch. The Raiders themselves had acknowledged Davis being in San Antonio for the event for Branch before news broke about a possible relocation, but wouldn't confirm nor deny that Davis also mentioned being there discussing moving his team east. Among the two existing NFL teams in Texas, Houston Texans' owner Bob McNair and Dallas Cowboys' owner Jerry Jones—the latter of which has San Antonio as part of his territorial rights and previously voiced support of an NFL team moving there when the New Orleans Saints temporarily played in San Antonio in 2005 due to damages to the Superdome following Hurricane Katrina—both favor an NFL team playing in San Antonio.

Though San Antonio is a smaller market than the San Francisco Bay Area, the Raiders wouldn't be sharing the market with another NFL team, and would only compete with the NBA's San Antonio Spurs among major sports teams. Additionally, the Raiders would use the Alamodome as a temporary home until an NFL-specific stadium could be constructed. The team's lease at the O.co Coliseum was expiring after the 2014 season.

On September 3, 2014, the city of Oakland reached a tentative deal to build a new football stadium in Oakland, which would result in the Coliseum being demolished; Davis did not respond to the proposal, which would also force the Oakland Athletics to build a new stadium of their own (which they have yet to agree to do), while Alameda County (co-owners of the current stadium) indicated they would probably not support the plan. Davis, in the meantime, continued to negotiate with San Antonio officials and had team officials scout the Alamodome to determine if it would be suitable for the NFL.

==== St. Louis Rams ====
The Rams and the St. Louis CVC began negotiating deals to get the Rams home stadium, the Edward Jones Dome into the top 25 percent of stadiums in the league (i.e., top eight teams of the thirty two NFL teams in reference to luxury boxes, amenities and overall fan experience). Under the terms of the lease agreement, the St. Louis CVC was required to make modifications to the Edward Jones Dome in 2005. However, then-owner, Georgia Frontiere, waived the provision in exchange for cash that served as a penalty for the city's noncompliance. The City of St. Louis, in subsequent years, made changes to the score board and increased the natural lighting by replacing panels with windows, although the overall feel remained dark. The minor renovations which totaled about $70 million did not bring the stadium within the specifications required under the lease agreement. On February 1, 2013, an Arbitrator (3 panel) selected to preside over the arbitration process found that the Edward Jones Dome was not in the top 25% of all NFL venues as required under the terms of the lease agreement between the Rams and the CVC. The Arbitrator (3 panel) further found that the estimated $700 million in proposed renovations by the Rams was not unreasonable given the terms of the lease agreement. Finally, the City of St. Louis was ordered to pay the Rams attorneys' fees which totaled a reported $2 million.

Publicly, city, county and state officials expressed no interest in providing further funding to the Edward Jones Dome in light of those entities, as well as taxpayers, continuing to owe approximately $300 million more on that facility. As such, if a resolution is not reached by the end of the 2014–2015 NFL season and the City of St. Louis remains non-compliant in its obligations under the lease agreement, the Rams would be free to nullify their lease and relocate.

On January 31, 2014, both the Los Angeles Times and the St. Louis Post-Dispatch reported that Rams owner Stan Kroenke purchased 60 acres of land adjacent to the Forum in Inglewood, Los Angeles County, California. It was, by the most conservative estimates, sufficient land on which an NFL-proper stadium may be constructed. The purchase price was rumored to have been between US$90–100 million. Commissioner Roger Goodell represented that Mr. Kroenke informed the league of the purchase. As an NFL owner, any purchase of land in which a potential stadium could be built must be disclosed to the league. This development further fueled rumors that the Rams intend to return its management and football operations to Southern California. The land was initially targeted for a Walmart Supercenter but Walmart could not get the necessary permits to build the center. Kroenke is married to Ann Walton Kroenke who is a member of the Walton family and many of Kroenke's real estate deals have involved Walmart properties.

== Records, milestones, and notable statistics ==
=== Week 1 ===
- Peyton Manning defeated his former team, the Indianapolis Colts, and in doing so became the second quarterback to defeat all 32 current NFL teams, joining Brett Favre.
- Allen Hurns became the first player in NFL history to have two TDs receiving in the first quarter in his NFL debut.
- In Week 1, quarterbacks completed 64.3 percent of their passes, an NFL record.

=== Week 2 ===
- Bill Belichick became the sixth coach in NFL history to reach 200 regular-season wins.
- The Philadelphia Eagles became the first team in NFL history to start the season 2–0 after trailing by at least 14 points at halftime in each of their first two games.

=== Week 3 ===
- Devin Hester set an NFL record with 20 total returns for touchdowns. The previous record was held by Deion Sanders, who had 19 touchdowns.
- The Philadelphia Eagles became the first NFL team to start a season 3–0 after trailing by 10-plus points in each game.
- Peyton Manning threw his 100th touchdown pass in his 35th game with the Denver Broncos, becoming the fastest quarterback in NFL history to achieve that feat with a single team. The previous record was held by Dan Marino, who did so in 44 games with the Miami Dolphins.

=== Week 4 ===
- The Green Bay Packers became the second NFL franchise to record their 700th regular-season victory, joining the Chicago Bears.
- There were zero punts in the Packers–Bears game, making it the second regular-season game in NFL history with no punts. The other regular-season game without a punt was a 1992 game between the Buffalo Bills and the San Francisco 49ers.
- Colts quarterback Andrew Luck became the first player in NFL history to throw for over 370 yards and 4 touchdowns, and have a completion percentage above 70 percent or above in consecutive games.

=== Week 5 ===
- The Cleveland Browns overcame a 28–3 deficit in their 29–28 win at Tennessee which was the largest comeback victory by an away team in NFL history.
- Peyton Manning became the second quarterback in NFL history to throw 500 touchdown passes, joining Brett Favre.
- Jason Witten became the third tight-end in NFL history to reach 10,000 career receiving yards, joining Shannon Sharpe and Tony Gonzalez.
- Tom Brady became the sixth quarterback in NFL history to reach 50,000 career passing yards.
- Wes Welker became the NFL's all-time leader in career pass receptions amongst undrafted wide receivers.
- No team started the season 4–0. This is only the third time that this has happened in the modern era; the others were 1970 and 2010.

=== Week 6 ===
- The Chicago Bears became the first NFL franchise to reach 750 total wins.
- DeMarco Murray became the second player in NFL history to rush for at least 100 yards in each of his team's first six games to start a season, joining Jim Brown.
- Julius Thomas, with his nine touchdown catches through his team's first five games of the season, tied the NFL record that was set by Calvin Johnson in 2011.
- With a passer rating above 120 for the fifth straight game, Philip Rivers has set an NFL record for most consecutive games above this mark. The previous record was shared by Johnny Unitas in 1965 and Kurt Warner in 2009, who each had four.
- Joe Flacco tied a league record set by Tommy Kramer in 1986 by recording 4 touchdown passes in the first quarter of a game.
- The Carolina Panthers and Cincinnati Bengals played to a 37–37 tie. This was the highest scoring tie game since the 1974 introduction of overtime to the regular season.

=== Week 7 ===
- Peyton Manning threw his 509th career touchdown pass, setting an NFL record. The previous record was held by Brett Favre, who had 508.
- DeMarco Murray became the first player in NFL history to rush for at least 100 yards in each of his team's first seven games to start a season, breaking the record he held with Jim Brown. Murray would go on to extend his record to eight games.
- Reggie Wayne became the ninth player in NFL history to reach 14,000 receiving yards.
- Russell Wilson became the first player in NFL history to have passed for over 300 yards and rush for over 100 yards in the same game.

=== Week 8 ===
- Ben Roethlisberger became the first player in NFL history to have two 500-yard passing games.

=== Week 9 ===
- Ben Roethlisberger became the first player in NFL history to record at least six touchdown passes in consecutive games.
- The Denver Broncos scored 20 or more points for the 29th consecutive regular-season game, setting a new record. The previous record was held by the St. Louis Rams who had 28 such games in 1999 and 2000.

=== Week 10 ===
- Michael Vick became the first quarterback in NFL history to reach 6,000 career rushing yards.
- Julius Thomas became the first tight end in NFL history to achieve back-to-back 12-touchdown seasons.
- Julius Thomas tied an NFL record for the most touchdown catches through nine games, with 12, joining Randy Moss in 2007.
- Aaron Rodgers tied the NFL record with six touchdowns in a half that was set by Daryle Lamonica in 1969.

=== Week 11 ===
- Adam Vinatieri became the first player in NFL history to score more than 100+ points in 17 different seasons, breaking the record previously held by Jason Elam, who had 16.
- J. J. Watt became the only player in league history (since sacks became an official statistic) to register a sack, forced fumble, fumble recovery and touchdown reception in the same game.

=== Week 12 ===
- The Atlanta Falcons became the first team in NFL history to lead a division while being three games below .500.

=== Week 15 ===
- The Denver Broncos won their 12th consecutive divisional away game, tying an NFL record that the San Francisco 49ers set from 1987 to 1990; John Fox became only the second head coach in NFL history to win four division titles in the first four seasons with a team, joining Chuck Knox.
- The New England Patriots set a record of 14 consecutive seasons of winning at least one game against all of their divisional opponents. The previous record of 13 seasons had been set by the 1971–83 Dallas Cowboys.

=== Week 17 ===
- Antonio Gates became the fourth tight end in league history to reach 10,000 career receiving yards, joining Tony Gonzalez, Jason Witten, and Shannon Sharpe.
- J. J. Watt became the first player in league history to have two separate seasons with 20 or more sacks.
- Matt Forte set the league season record for receptions by a running back, finishing with 102.
- The Seattle Seahawks became the first team since the 1969–1971 Minnesota Vikings to lead the NFL in fewest points allowed in three consecutive seasons.
- Drew Brees tied Sonny Jurgensen and Dan Marino for the league record for most seasons leading the league in passing yards, with five.
- Joe Thomas became the first offensive lineman in NFL history to be selected to the Pro Bowl in each of his first eight seasons.
- The Carolina Panthers became the second team in the modern era to win their division with a losing record (7–8–1), joining the 2010 Seattle Seahawks.

== Regular season statistical leaders ==
Individual
Scoring leader	Stephen Gostkowski, New England (156)
Most field goals made	Stephen Gostkowski, New England (35 FGs)
Touchdowns	Marshawn Lynch, Seattle (17 TDs)
Rushing	DeMarco Murray, Dallas (1,845 yards)
Passing yards	Drew Brees, New Orleans and Ben Roethlisberger, Pittsburgh (4,952 yards)
Passing touchdowns	Andrew Luck, Indianapolis (40 TDs)
Passer rating	Tony Romo, Dallas (113.2 rating)
Pass receptions	Antonio Brown, Pittsburgh (129 catches)
Pass receiving yards	Antonio Brown, Pittsburgh (1,698 yards)
Combined tackles	Luke Kuechly, Carolina (171 tackles)
Interceptions	Glover Quin, Detroit (7)
Punting	Marquette King, Oakland (4,930 yards, 45.2 average yards)
Sacks	Justin Houston, Kansas City (22)

== Awards ==
=== Individual season awards ===
The 4th NFL Honors, saluting the best players and plays from 2014 season, was held at Phoenix Symphony Hall in Phoenix, Arizona on January 31, 2015.

Award	Winner	Position	Team
AP Most Valuable Player	Aaron Rodgers	Quarterback	Green Bay Packers
AP Offensive Player of the Year	DeMarco Murray	Running back	Dallas Cowboys
AP Defensive Player of the Year	J. J. Watt	Defensive end	Houston Texans
AP Coach of the Year	Bruce Arians	Head coach	Arizona Cardinals
AP Offensive Rookie of the Year	Odell Beckham Jr.	Wide receiver	New York Giants
AP Assistant Coach of the Year	Todd Bowles	Defensive coordinator	Arizona Cardinals
AP Defensive Rookie of the Year	Aaron Donald	Defensive tackle	St. Louis Rams
AP Comeback Player of the Year	Rob Gronkowski	Tight end	New England Patriots
Pepsi Rookie of the Year	Teddy Bridgewater	Quarterback	Minnesota Vikings
Walter Payton NFL Man of the Year	Thomas Davis	Linebacker	Carolina Panthers
PFWA NFL Executive of the Year	Jerry Jones	Owner/President/General Manager	Dallas Cowboys
Super Bowl Most Valuable Player	Tom Brady	Quarterback	New England Patriots

=== All-Pro team ===
The following players were named first team All-Pro by the Associated Press:

Offense
Quarterback	Aaron Rodgers, Green Bay
Running back	DeMarco Murray, Dallas; Le'Veon Bell, Pittsburgh
Fullback	John Kuhn, Green Bay
Wide receiver	Antonio Brown, Pittsburgh; Dez Bryant, Dallas
Tight end	Rob Gronkowski, New England
Offensive tackle	Tyron Smith, Dallas; Joe Thomas, Cleveland
Offensive guard	Marshal Yanda, Baltimore; Zack Martin, Dallas
Center	Maurkice Pouncey, Pittsburgh

Defense
Defensive end	J. J. Watt, Houston; Mario Williams, Buffalo
Defensive tackle	Ndamukong Suh, Detroit; Marcell Dareus, Buffalo
Outside linebacker	Justin Houston, Kansas City; Elvis Dumervil, Baltimore
Inside linebacker	Luke Kuechly, Carolina; Bobby Wagner, Seattle
Cornerback	Darrelle Revis, New England; Richard Sherman, Seattle
Safety	Earl Thomas, Seattle; Eric Weddle, San Diego

Special teams
Kicker	Adam Vinatieri, Indianapolis
Punter	Pat McAfee, Indianapolis
Kick returner	Adam Jones, Cincinnati

=== Players of the week/month ===
The following were named the top performers during the 2014 season:

Week/ Month	Offensive Player of the Week/Month		Defensive Player of the Week/Month		Special Teams Player of the Week/Month	
Week/ Month	AFC	NFC	AFC	NFC	AFC	NFC
1	Julius Thomas (Broncos)	Matt Ryan (Falcons)	Cameron Wake (Dolphins)	DeAndre Levy (Lions)	Dan Carpenter (Bills)	Matt Bryant (Falcons)
2	Antonio Gates (Chargers)	Darren Sproles (Eagles)	Chandler Jones (Patriots)	Kyle Fuller (Bears)	C. J. Spiller (Bills)	Ted Ginn Jr. (Cardinals)
3	Andrew Luck (Colts)	Matt Ryan (Falcons)	Corey Liuget (Chargers)	Kam Chancellor (Seahawks)	Justin Tucker (Ravens)	Devin Hester (Falcons)
4	Jamaal Charles (Chiefs)	Aaron Rodgers (Packers)	J. J. Watt (Texans)	Antoine Bethea (49ers)	Nick Novak (Chargers)	Darren Sproles (Eagles)
Sept.	Philip Rivers (Chargers)	DeMarco Murray (Cowboys)	J. J. Watt (Texans)	DeAndre Levy (Lions)	Pat McAfee (Colts)	Jon Ryan (Seahawks)
5	Demaryius Thomas (Broncos)	Russell Wilson (Seahawks)	Marcell Dareus (Bills)	Julius Peppers (Packers)	Tank Carder (Browns)	Phil Dawson (49ers)
6	Joe Flacco (Ravens)	Tyron Smith (Cowboys)	Jurrell Casey (Titans)	Ezekiel Ansah (Lions)	Pat McAfee (Colts)	Chandler Catanzaro (Cardinals)
7	Peyton Manning (Broncos)	Aaron Rodgers (Packers)	Telvin Smith (Jaguars)	Keenan Robinson (Redskins)	Chris Jones (Patriots)	Stedman Bailey (Rams)
8	Ben Roethlisberger (Steelers)	Larry Fitzgerald (Cardinals)	Louis Delmas (Dolphins)	Anthony Barr (Vikings)	Knile Davis (Chiefs)	Kai Forbath (Redskins)
Oct.	Tom Brady (Patriots)	DeMarco Murray (Cowboys)	Von Miller (Broncos)	Everson Griffen (Vikings)	Jarvis Landry (Dolphins)	Shayne Graham (Saints)
9	Ben Roethlisberger (Steelers)	Jeremy Maclin (Eagles)	Brent Grimes (Dolphins)	Junior Galette (Saints)	Julian Edelman (Patriots)	Justin Bethel (Cardinals)
10	Justin Forsett (Ravens)	Aaron Rodgers (Packers)	Jaiquawn Jarrett (Jets)	Patrick Peterson (Cardinals)	Anthony Sherman (Chiefs)	Darren Sproles (Eagles)
11	Jonas Gray (Patriots)	Mike Evans (Buccaneers)	J. J. Watt (Texans)	Chris Borland (49ers)	Mike Scifres (Chargers)	Greg Zuerlein (Rams)
12	Justin Forsett (Ravens)	Eddie Lacy (Packers)	Charles Woodson (Raiders)	Kam Chancellor (Seahawks)	Anthony Dixon (Bills)	Josh Huff (Eagles)
13	Ryan Fitzpatrick (Texans)	Drew Brees (Saints)	D'Qwell Jackson (Colts)	Richard Sherman (Seahawks)	Josh Scobee (Jaguars)	Adam Thielen (Vikings)
Nov.	Andrew Luck (Colts)	Aaron Rodgers (Packers)	Mario Williams (Bills)	Connor Barwin (Eagles)	Justin Tucker (Ravens)	Matt Bryant (Falcons)
14	Le'Veon Bell (Steelers)	Cam Newton (Panthers)	Elvis Dumervil (Ravens)	Devon Kennard (Giants)	Ryan Allen (Patriots)	Tavon Austin (Rams)
15	Jeremy Hill (Bengals)	Dez Bryant (Cowboys)	Aqib Talib (Broncos)	Glover Quin (Lions)	De'Anthony Thomas (Chiefs)	Chandler Catanzaro (Cardinals)
16	Philip Rivers (Chargers)	Russell Wilson (Seahawks)	Dre Kirkpatrick (Bengals)	Clay Matthews (Packers)	Randy Bullock (Texans)	Matt Bosher (Falcons)
17	C. J. Anderson (Broncos)	Aaron Rodgers (Packers)	Jonathan Newsome (Colts)	Roman Harper (Panthers)	Antonio Brown (Steelers)	Micah Hyde (Packers)
Dec.	Antonio Brown (Steelers)	Tony Romo (Cowboys)	J. J. Watt (Texans)	Bobby Wagner (Seahawks)	Connor Barth (Broncos)	Justin Bethel (Cardinals)

Week	FedEx Air Player of the Week (Quarterbacks)	FedEx Ground Player of the Week (Running Backs)	Pepsi Next Rookie of the Week
1	Matt Ryan (Falcons)	Knowshon Moreno (Dolphins)	Kelvin Benjamin (Panthers)
2	Philip Rivers (Chargers)	DeMarco Murray (Cowboys)	Sammy Watkins (Bills)
3	Kirk Cousins (Redskins)	Le'Veon Bell (Steelers)	Kyle Fuller (Bears)
4	Philip Rivers (Chargers)	DeMarco Murray (Cowboys)	Teddy Bridgewater (Vikings)
5	Peyton Manning (Broncos)	DeMarco Murray (Cowboys)	Branden Oliver (Chargers)
6	Joe Flacco (Ravens)	DeMarco Murray (Cowboys)	Branden Oliver (Chargers)
7	Peyton Manning (Broncos)	DeMarco Murray (Cowboys)	Sammy Watkins (Bills)
8	Ben Roethlisberger (Steelers)	Mark Ingram II (Saints)	Sammy Watkins (Bills)
9	Ben Roethlisberger (Steelers)	Jeremy Hill (Bengals)	Jeremy Hill (Bengals)
10	Aaron Rodgers (Packers)	Marshawn Lynch (Seahawks)	Chris Borland (49ers)
11	Aaron Rodgers (Packers)	Le'Veon Bell (Steelers)	Chris Borland (49ers)
12	Tony Romo (Cowboys)	Justin Forsett (Ravens)	Odell Beckham Jr. (Giants)
13	Ryan Fitzpatrick (Texans)	C. J. Anderson (Broncos)	Teddy Bridgewater (Vikings)
14	Ben Roethlisberger (Steelers)	Le'Veon Bell (Steelers)	Derek Carr (Raiders)
15	Ben Roethlisberger (Steelers)	Jeremy Hill (Bengals)	Odell Beckham Jr. (Giants)
16	Philip Rivers (Chargers)	Marshawn Lynch (Seahawks)	Odell Beckham Jr. (Giants)
17	Joe Flacco (Ravens)	Lamar Miller (Dolphins)	Odell Beckham Jr. (Giants)

Month	Rookie of the Month	
Month	Offensive	Defensive
Sept.	Kelvin Benjamin (Panthers)	Kyle Fuller (Bears)
Oct.	Sammy Watkins (Bills)	C. J. Mosley (Ravens)
Nov.	Odell Beckham Jr. (Giants)	Chris Borland (49ers)
Dec.	Odell Beckham Jr. (Giants)	C. J. Mosley (Ravens)

== Head coach/front office personnel changes ==
=== Head coach ===
==== Offseason ====
Team	2013 head coach (at start of season)	2013 interim head coach	Reason for leaving	2014 replacement	Notes
Houston Texans	Gary Kubiak	Wade Phillips	Fired	Bill O'Brien	Kubiak was fired on December 6, 2013, after accumulating a 61–63 record in just under eight seasons as the Texans' head coach. Wade Phillips was named the interim head coach for the remainder of the 2013 season. Kubiak joined the Baltimore Ravens as offensive coordinator. O'Brien spent the past two seasons as the Penn State head coach and previously as a New England Patriots assistant.
Cleveland Browns	Rob Chudzinski		Fired	Mike Pettine	Chudzinski was fired on December 29, 2013, after going 4–12 in his only season as Browns head coach. Chudzinski joined the Indianapolis Colts as a special assistant to the head coach. Pettine was the Buffalo Bills' defensive coordinator last season.
Detroit Lions	Jim Schwartz		Fired	Jim Caldwell	Schwartz was fired on December 30, 2013, after a 1–6 stumble to end the 2013 season despite having led the NFC North earlier in the season. He finished with a 29–51 record over five seasons. Schwartz joined the Buffalo Bills as defensive coordinator. Caldwell was hired as head coach on January 14. He had been head coach for the Indianapolis Colts from 2009 to 2011 and finished with a 26–22 record. For the last year and a half, he was the Baltimore Ravens' offensive coordinator and quarterbacks coach.
Minnesota Vikings	Leslie Frazier		Fired	Mike Zimmer	Frazier was fired on December 30, 2013, after more than three seasons as Vikings head coach, ending 2013 with a 5–10–1 record, and his tenure with Minnesota at 21–32–1. Frazier joined the Tampa Bay Buccaneers as defensive coordinator. Zimmer was hired on January 15 and this is his first head-coaching position. He had been the defensive coordinator of the Cincinnati Bengals since 2008. He was also the defensive coordinator for the Atlanta Falcons in 2007 and the Dallas Cowboys from 2000 to 2006.
Tampa Bay Buccaneers	Greg Schiano		Fired	Lovie Smith	Schiano was fired on December 30, 2013, along with GM Mark Dominik. Schiano was 11–21 as head coach over two seasons. Smith, a former Buccaneers assistant, served as the head coach of the Chicago Bears from 2004 to 2012.
Tennessee Titans	Mike Munchak		Fired	Ken Whisenhunt	Munchak was fired on January 4, 2014, after three seasons as Titans head coach, ending his 32-season tenure with the team. He was 22–26 as head coach. Munchak joined the Pittsburgh Steelers as offensive line coach. Whisenhunt was previously the head coach of the Arizona Cardinals from 2007 to 2012, compiling a record of 45–51, and served as the offensive coordinator of the San Diego Chargers in 2013.
Washington Redskins	Mike Shanahan		Fired	Jay Gruden	Shanahan and his staff (except for defensive coordinator Jim Haslett) were fired on December 30, 2013, after a 3–13 record in 2013 and a 24–40 career regular season record with the Redskins. Gruden, who had spent the past three seasons as the offensive coordinator of the Cincinnati Bengals, had previously served as head coach of the Florida Tuskers of the UFL and Orlando Predators of the AFL.

==== In-season ====
Team	2014 head coach	Reason for leaving	Interim head coach	Notes
Oakland Raiders	Dennis Allen	Fired	Tony Sparano	Allen was fired on September 29 after an 8–28 record as Raiders head coach, and an 0–4 start to the season. Sparano was named interim head coach on September 30. Sparano previously served as the Miami Dolphins' head coach from 2008 to 2011, amassing a record of 29–32.

=== Front office ===
==== Offseason ====
Team	Position	2013 office holder	Reason for leaving	2014 replacement	Notes
Tampa Bay Buccaneers	GM	Mark Dominik	Fired	Jason Licht	Dominik was fired on December 30, 2013. He was replaced by Licht who had been the vice president of player personnel of the Arizona Cardinals in 2013. Prior to that Licht had served as the Cardinals director of player personnel and had also worked in the front offices of the New England Patriots and Philadelphia Eagles. He got his start in the NFL as a scout with the Patriots, Panthers and Dolphins.
Cleveland Browns	GM	Mike Lombardi	Fired	Ray Farmer	Lombardi and Banner were fired by Browns owner Jimmy Haslam on February 11 after a lengthy coaching search revealed discord between the two executives. Farmer was promoted from assistant GM to replace Lombardi while no replacement for Banner as CEO was named.
Cleveland Browns	CEO	Joe Banner	Fired	not replaced	Lombardi and Banner were fired by Browns owner Jimmy Haslam on February 11 after a lengthy coaching search revealed discord between the two executives. Farmer was promoted from assistant GM to replace Lombardi while no replacement for Banner as CEO was named.
Miami Dolphins	GM	Jeff Ireland	Mutual agreement	Dennis Hickey	Ireland and the Dolphins announced on January 7 that he was leaving the team in the "mutual best interest" of both parties, although it was reported that Ireland was to have been stripped of powers had he remained with the team. He had been in the role since 2008. Dennis Hickey was hired to replace Ireland on January 27. He had been the director of player personnel of the Tampa Bay Buccaneers since 2011. Prior to that he had been the Bucs' director of college scouting after starting with the team as a scout.
Denver Broncos	CEO	Pat Bowlen	Resigned	Joe Ellis	Bowlen resigned his post as CEO and relinquished control of his team on July 23, 2014. Since 2010, he had previously moved most of his duties to team president Joe Ellis and executive vice president/general manager John Elway, following a diagnosis of Alzheimer's disease.

== Stadium changes ==
- Levi's Stadium, the new stadium for the San Francisco 49ers, opened in July 2014. The stadium is located in Santa Clara, California, directly west of the 49ers long-existing team offices and practice facility, and hosted Super Bowl 50 in early 2016. In November 2013, stadium and team officials requested that the NFL not schedule any weekday home games during the preseason or regular season – including Monday and Thursday Night Football – due to parking issues within the area. The plan was to borrow parking facilities from nearby businesses and a community college, but the concern was that those entities would have the parking needs on weekdays. Two months later (January 2014), the Santa Clara City Council approved a two-year deal with the Santa Clara Golf & Tennis Club that would have opened up 10,000 additional parking spaces within walking distance of Levi's Stadium, as well as reimbursed the club $250,000 for each year, which also would have enabled the 49ers to host Monday and Thursday night games for both the 2014 and 2015 seasons. However, the NFL decided not to schedule the 49ers for any weeknight prime-time games at Levi's Stadium during the 2014 season until traffic flow within the area is figured out. An exception was made for Thanksgiving, when the regular work traffic and parking would not be an issue.
- Reliant Stadium, the home of the Houston Texans, was renamed NRG Stadium. Reliant Energy, which held the naming rights to the Texans' home field since their inaugural 2002 season, was previously purchased in 2009 by its parent company NRG Energy.
- The Minnesota Vikings played their first of two consecutive seasons at the University of Minnesota's TCF Bank Stadium, as they awaited the construction of a new stadium at the site of the Hubert H. Humphrey Metrodome. Due to an agreement with the University of Minnesota, the Vikings did not host any Monday or Thursday night games at the stadium. The only exceptions would have been during Thanksgiving (in which the Vikings were not scheduled), Week 16 (which occurs after the university's academic finals), or times when the university is in recess in order to minimize the disruption of on-campus operations, and the Vikings also would have had to plan around the Gophers' home schedule and other UM events, including student move-in week and academic finals.
- The Oakland Raiders' lease on O.co Coliseum expired after the 2013 season. The Raiders played at the stadium for seven of their 2014 home games under a one-year emergency extension but its future after that remained unclear. Prior to the season, the Raiders had announced their eighth home game was to be played at Wembley Stadium as part of the International Series.

== Uniforms ==
- The Tampa Bay Buccaneers unveiled a new logo and helmet on February 20, 2014, as well as a new uniform on March 3. The team also wore a patch with the initials of late owner Malcolm Glazer who died on May 28 at the age of 85.
- The Philadelphia Eagles wore their alternate black jerseys during a preseason game against the New England Patriots as well as for their Week 6 game vs. the New York Giants, the latter of which marked the first time in franchise history that the team wore all black. This was the result of the team upgrading their uniforms to take advantage of the "Elite 51" technology from Nike, which most teams had been using since 2012. The team's standard "midnight green" jerseys did not become available until their Week 10 game vs. the Carolina Panthers, because midnight green was considered a custom color and took longer to produce.
- The Detroit Lions wore patches with the initials of late owner William Clay Ford Sr. who died on March 9 at the age of 88.
- The Buffalo Bills wore patches with the initials of late owner Ralph Wilson who died on March 25 at the age of 95.
- The Tennessee Titans wore their white jerseys for every game during the 2014 season, for the exception of their Week 8 game vs. the Houston Texans, in which the Titans wore their alternate navy blue jerseys. The team did wear their standard light "Titans blue" jerseys for both of their preseason home games. Tommy Smith, who was named the new Titans' president and CEO following the death of longtime owner Bud Adams in 2013, indicated that the light "Titans Blue" jerseys, which had been the team's primary colored jersey since 2008, were being phased out. The navy blue jerseys, which were the Titans' primary colored jerseys from 1999 to 2007, returned as the team's primary home jersey beginning in 2015.
- The Pittsburgh Steelers honored the 40th anniversary of their first Super Bowl winning team, Super Bowl IX, during their Week 13 game against the New Orleans Saints at Heinz Field on Sunday, November 30 by wearing a special patch and honored the players at halftime. As it also served as the team's annual alumni weekend, the team wore their standard home uniforms for the game, opting instead to wear their alternate 1934 "Bumblebee" throwbacks against the Indianapolis Colts on October 26.
- The New York Giants wore a patch commemorating their 90th season.
- The Carolina Panthers and the Jacksonville Jaguars wore patches to commemorate the 20th season of play for both franchises.

== Media ==
2014 was the first season under a nine-year television contract with CBS (almost all AFC afternoon away games), Fox (almost all NFC afternoon away games), NBC (Sunday Night Football games, Thanksgiving night game, and the Kickoff game); and an eight-year contract with ESPN (Monday Night Football games). Among the changes from the previous television contracts were allowing games to be "cross-flexed" between CBS and Fox, enabling CBS to televise NFC away games, and Fox to broadcast AFC away games (see above). NBC was given the rights to broadcast a Divisional playoff game, and their Spanish language sister network Mun2 simulcasted select NBC games, with Spanish language graphics and play-by-play during the Thanksgiving game; Mun2 changed their branding to the more sports-centric NBC Universo with their Spanish simulcast of Super Bowl XLIX. The contract also allowed ESPN to televise a Wild Card playoff game (which, like other NFL games carried on cable, was simulcast on an over-the-air station in each of the team's primary market). In addition, ESPN began exclusively televising all Pro Bowls for the next eight seasons.

Under a new, one-year contract, CBS also took over the production of Thursday Night Football and aired the first eight games of the package, plus half of a Week 16 Saturday doubleheader, in simulcast with NFL Network. The arrangement was meant to bring more prominence and higher production values to TNF, which had historically hosted the league's least-watched primetime games. As part of the arrangement, CBS affiliates were given the right of first refusal to air the required local simulcasts of TNF games solely broadcast elsewhere by NFL Network. The agreement was renewed for the 2015 season.

CBS made several personnel changes following the retirements of Don Criqui, Marv Albert, and Dan Dierdorf from the NFL broadcast booth. Brian Anderson and Tom McCarthy joined as play-by-play announcers, while Chris Simms (Phil Simms' son) and Trent Green joined as color commentators, both of whom come over from Fox Sports. CBS used a three-man announcing crew of Andrew Catalon, Steve Beuerlein and Steve Tasker on select regional NFL games, a departure from the typical practice of reserving three-man crews for national and high-profile contests. Mike Carey joined the broadcast team as the network's in-house rules expert. Jim Nantz and Phil Simms handled play-by-play for the Thursday Night Football games. There were also changes to The NFL Today, as Shannon Sharpe and Dan Marino both left the panel, replaced by Bart Scott and Tony Gonzalez.

On Fox, the most notable personnel change was the demotion of Pam Oliver, Fox's top sideline reporter for nearly 20 years, to the second broadcast team as Erin Andrews took over the spot on the first broadcast team. Other personnel changes include the additions of Donovan McNabb, David Diehl, Kirk Morrison, and Brendan Ayanbadejo to Fox's stable of color commentators, replacing outgoing commentators Tom McCarthy, Brian Billick and Tim Ryan. Brady Quinn also joined the Fox stable. Also briefly joining Fox's play-by-play stable was UFC announcer Mike Goldberg; Goldberg's time doing NFL telecasts was cut short after one game, and he was replaced by Tim Brando, who came over from CBS.

== Television viewers and ratings ==
=== Most watched regular season games ===
- DH = doubleheader

Rank	Date	Matchup				Network	Viewers (millions)	TV Rating	Window	Significance
1	November 27, 4:30 ET	Philadelphia Eagles	33	Dallas Cowboys	10	Fox	32.0	14.2	Thanksgiving	Cowboys–Eagles Rivalry
2	November 30, 4:25 ET	New England Patriots	21	Green Bay Packers	26	CBS	30.9	17.6	Late DH^{[a]}	
3	October 12, 4:25 ET	Dallas Cowboys	30	Seattle Seahawks	23	Fox	30.0	17.4	Late DH^{[b]}	
4	November 27, 12:30 ET	Chicago Bears	17	Detroit Lions	34	CBS	29.4	14.2	Thanksgiving	Bears–Lions Rivalry
5	November 2, 4:25 ET	Denver Broncos	21	New England Patriots	43	CBS	29.1	16.8	Late DH^{[c]}	
6	December 28, 4:25 ET	Detroit Lions	20	Green Bay Packers	30	Fox	28.5	15.6	Late DH^{[d]}	Lions–Packers Rivalry
7	September 7, 4:25 ET	San Francisco 49ers	28	Dallas Cowboys	17	Fox	28.0	15.7	Late DH^{[e]}	49ers–Cowboys rivalry
8	September 21, 4:25 ET	Denver Broncos	20	Seattle Seahawks	26	CBS	27.3	15.8	Late DH^{[f]}	Super Bowl XLVIII Rematch
9	October 19, 4:25 ET	New York Giants	21	Dallas Cowboys	31	Fox	27.0	15.6	Late DH^{[g]}	Cowboys–Giants rivalry
10	September 4, 8:30 ET	Green Bay Packers	16	Seattle Seahawks	36	NBC	26.9	15.5	Kickoff game	Packers–Seahawks Rivalry

*Note – Late DH matchups listed in table are the matchups that were shown to the largest percentage of the market.

1. NE/GB was shown to 98% of the markets during the late doubleheader time slot of CBS coverage.
2. DAL/SEA was shown in 69% of the markets during the late doubleheader time slot of Fox coverage.
3. DEN/NE was shown in 92% of the markets during the late doubleheader time slot of CBS coverage.
4. DET/GB was shown in 87% of the markets in the late doubleheader time slot of Fox coverage.
5. SF/DAL was shown in 89% of the markets during the late doubleheader time slot of Fox coverage.
6. DEN/SEA was shown in 89% of the markets during the late doubleheader time slot of CBS coverage.
7. NYG/DAL was shown in 92% of the markets during the late doubleheader time slot of Fox coverage.

=== Playoff games ===
Rank	Game	Date	Matchup				Network	Viewers (millions)	TV Rating
1	Super Bowl XLIX	February 1, 2015, 6:30 ET	New England Patriots	28	Seattle Seahawks	24	NBC	114.4	47.5
2	NFC Championship	January 18, 2015, 3:05 ET	Green Bay Packers	22	Seattle Seahawks	28	Fox	49.8	27.4
3	Divisional Round	January 11, 2015, 1:05 ET	Dallas Cowboys	21	Green Bay Packers	26	Fox	44.4	24.9
4	Wild Card Round	January 4, 2015, 4:40 ET	Detroit Lions	20	Dallas Cowboys	24	Fox	42.3	23.6
5	AFC Championship	January 18, 2015, 6:50 ET	Indianapolis Colts	7	New England Patriots	45	CBS	42.1	22.5
6	Divisional Round	January 11, 2015, 4:40 ET	Indianapolis Colts	24	Denver Broncos	13	CBS	41.8	23.3
7	Divisional Round	January 10, 2015, 4:35 ET	Baltimore Ravens	31	New England Patriots	35	NBC	34.1	19.6
8	Divisional Round	January 10, 2015, 8:15 ET	Carolina Panthers	17	Seattle Seahawks	31	Fox	31.0	17.2
9	Wild Card Round	January 4, 2015, 1:05 ET	Cincinnati Bengals	10	Indianapolis Colts	26	CBS	28.3	17
10	Wild Card Round	January 3, 2015, 8:15 ET	Baltimore Ravens	30	Pittsburgh Steelers	17	NBC	27.9	15.8
11	Wild Card Round	January 3, 2015, 4:20 ET	Arizona Cardinals	16	Carolina Panthers	27	ESPN	21.7	12.5

== See also ==
- Deflategate
