= Henry Jones (American football) =

American football player (born 1967)

No. 20, 21, 30
- Position: Safety

Personal information
- Born: December 29, 1967 (age 58); St. Louis, Missouri, U.S.
- Listed height: 6 ft 0 in (1.83 m)
- Listed weight: 200 lb (91 kg)

Career information
- High school: St. Louis University
- College: Illinois
- NFL draft: 1991: 1st round, 26th overall pick

Career history
- Buffalo Bills (1991–2000); Minnesota Vikings (2001); Atlanta Falcons (2002)

Awards and highlights
- First-team All-Pro (1992); Pro Bowl (1992); NFL interceptions co-leader (1992); Buffalo Bills 50th Anniversary Team; Second-team All-Big Ten (1990)

Career NFL statistics
- Interceptions: 18
- Interception yards: 455
- Touchdowns: 4
- Stats at Pro Football Reference

Henry Louis Jones (born December 29, 1967) is an American former professional football player who was a safety in the National Football League (NFL). He played for the Buffalo Bills (1991–2000), the Minnesota Vikings (2001), and the Atlanta Falcons (2002).

== Professional career ==
Jones was drafted in the first round of the 1991 NFL Draft by the Buffalo Bills with the 26th overall pick. In just his second year in the NFL, Jones was a Pro Bowl selection as he led the league along with Minnesota's Audray McMillian with eight interceptions.

Jones's most superb season was in 1992. In the 10 following seasons, he recorded just 10 more total interceptions. He retired after the 2002 season with 18 career interceptions, which he returned for 455 yards and 4 touchdowns. He also recorded 5 sacks, 9 fumble recoveries, 14 fumble return yards, and 41 kickoff return yards.

== Personal life ==
His daughter is Jasmine Jones, who qualified to represent the United States at the 2024 Summer Olympics in the 400 metres hurdles.
