= Barry Rose (American football) =

American football player (born 1968)

No. 81, 80
- Position: Wide receiver

Personal information
- Born: July 28, 1968 (age 58); Hudson, Wisconsin, U.S.
- Listed height: 6 ft 0 in (1.83 m)
- Listed weight: 185 lb (84 kg)

Career information
- High school: Baldwin-Woodville
- College: Wisconsin–Stevens Point
- NFL draft: 1992: 10th round, 279th overall pick

Career history
- Buffalo Bills (1992)*; Denver Broncos (1993); Carolina Panthers (1995)*; Hamilton Tiger-Cats (1995)
- * Offseason or practice squad member only
- Stats at Pro Football Reference

Barry Rose is a former wide receiver in the National Football League. Rose was drafted in the tenth round of the 1992 NFL draft by the Buffalo Bills and would play with the Denver Broncos during the 1993 NFL season. Later he would play with the Hamilton Tiger-Cats of the Canadian Football League in 1995 and was drafted by the London Monarchs of the World League of American Football in 1997. He was inducted into the University of Wisconsin-Stevens Point Athletics Hall of Fame in 2006.
