= Glenn Parker =

American football player (born 1966)

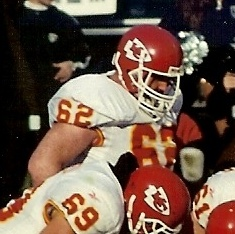
- Parker with the Kansas City Chiefs in 1997

No. 74, 62
- Positions: Guard, tackle

Personal information
- Born: April 22, 1966 (age 60); Westminster, California, U.S.
- Listed height: 6 ft 5 in (1.96 m)
- Listed weight: 305 lb (138 kg)

Career information
- High school: Edison (Huntington Beach, California)
- College: Arizona
- NFL draft: 1990: 3rd round, 69th overall pick

Career history
- Buffalo Bills (1990–1996); Kansas City Chiefs (1997–1999); New York Giants (2000–2001)

Career NFL statistics
- Games played: 174
- Games started: 141
- Fumble recoveries: 6
- Stats at Pro Football Reference

Glenn Andrew Parker (born April 22, 1966) is an American former professional football player who was an offensive lineman in the National Football League (NFL) who played for the Buffalo Bills, the Kansas City Chiefs, and the New York Giants. After his retirement, he became a television NFL analyst.

== Biography ==
=== Playing career ===
Parker attended Edison High School in Huntington Beach, but was not in the athletics programs. He first played for Golden West College, a junior college in Huntington Beach.

That led him to Tucson, where he played for the University of Arizona and was selected in the third round of the 1990 NFL draft by the Buffalo Bills with the 69th overall pick. He played for the Bills until 1997, playing in all four Super Bowls the team lost from 1990-1993. He then went to play three years for the Chiefs, then was released during the 2000 offseason. He was picked up as a free agent by the Giants, where he played two more seasons, and was an integral part of the Super Bowl XXXV team. He retired after the 2001 season after being released by the Giants, being one of only three players (along with Cornelius Bennett and Gale Gilbert) to play in, and be on the losing team in five separate Super Bowls. He started in 141 of the 174 games he played, as well as all 16 of his postseason appearances.

=== Broadcasting career ===
Parker has been an analyst on the NFL Network's Playbook since late 2003, and is the main college football analyst for the CBS College Sports Network, The AFL on NBC. Parker also has appeared on Fox Sports, covering features on NFL Europa, and appeared on ESPN's NFL 2Nite. He was also one of the main analysts for College Football on Versus. Starting the 2012 season, he can be heard as the lead college football analyst for the new Pac-12 Network. He has also called Arizona Cardinals preseason games with Mike Goldberg.

He was previously the host of In The House, airing on KCUB-AM in Tucson, Arizona.

=== Personal life ===
Fairly well known for his culinary and wine interests, he appeared on The Food Network.

Glenn Parker is married, with four children, named Madeleine, Emily, and William and Caroline. They live in Tucson, Arizona.
