= Howard Ballard =

American football player (born 1963)

No. 75
- Position: Offensive tackle

Personal information
- Born: November 3, 1963 (age 63); Ashland, Alabama, U.S.
- Listed height: 6 ft 6 in (1.98 m)
- Listed weight: 325 lb (147 kg)

Career information
- High school: Ashland
- College: Alabama A&M University
- NFL draft: 1987: 11th round, 283rd overall pick

Career history
- Buffalo Bills (1988–1993); Seattle Seahawks (1994–1998)

Awards and highlights
- 2× Pro Bowl (1992, 1993); Seattle Seahawks 35th Anniversary team

Career NFL statistics
- Games played: 170
- Games started: 154
- Fumble recoveries: 3
- Stats at Pro Football Reference

Howard Louis Ballard (born November 3, 1963) is an American former professional football player who was an offensive tackle in the National Football League (NFL) for the Buffalo Bills and Seattle Seahawks. He was selected by the Bills in the 11th round of the 1987 NFL draft. Nicknamed "House", for his sturdy build, he played in four Super Bowls and was selected to two Pro Bowls while a member of the Bills. He played college football at Alabama A&M University .

After breaking his leg in a game, which ended his career, Ballard worked as a sheriff's deputy in Clay County, Alabama. He eventually returned to school to finish his degree, and started coaching high school football in Pike County, Alabama.
