= List of Super Bowl champions =

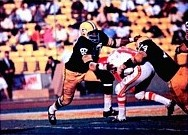
The Packers defeated the Chiefs in the first AFL–NFL World Championship Game (Super Bowl I).

The Super Bowl is the annual American football game that determines the champion of the National Football League (NFL). The game culminates a season that begins in the previous calendar year, and is the conclusion of the NFL playoffs. The winner receives the Vince Lombardi Trophy. The contest is held in an American city, chosen three to four years beforehand, usually at warm-weather sites or domed stadiums. Since January 1971, the winner of the American Football Conference (AFC) Championship Game has faced the winner of the National Football Conference (NFC) Championship Game in the culmination of the NFL playoffs.

Before the 1970 merger between the American Football League (AFL) and the NFL, the two leagues met in four such contests. The first two were marketed as the "AFL–NFL World Championship Game", but were also casually referred to as "the Super Bowl game" during the television broadcast. Super Bowl III in January 1969 was the first such game that carried the "Super Bowl" moniker in official marketing; the names "Super Bowl I" and "Super Bowl II" were retroactively applied to the first two games.

A total of 20 franchises, including teams that have relocated to another city or changed their name, have won the Super Bowl. There are four NFL teams that have never appeared in a Super Bowl: the Cleveland Browns, Detroit Lions, Jacksonville Jaguars, and Houston Texans, though both the Browns (1950, 1954, 1955, 1964) and Lions (1935, 1952, 1953, 1957) had won NFL Championship Games prior to the creation of the Super Bowl in the 1966 season.

The 1972 Miami Dolphins capped off the only perfect season in NFL history with their victory in Super Bowl VII. Only two franchises have ever won the Super Bowl while hosting at their home stadiums: the Tampa Bay Buccaneers in Super Bowl LV and the Los Angeles Rams in Super Bowl LVI. The reigning champions are the Seattle Seahawks following their victory over the New England Patriots in Super Bowl LX.

Teams with Super Bowl championships
– 1 championship, – 2 championships, – 3 championships, – 4 championships, – 5 championships, – 6 championships

== Results ==
Numbers in parentheses in the table are Super Bowl appearances as of the date of that Super Bowl and are used as follows:

- Winning team and Losing team columns indicate the number of times that team has appeared in a Super Bowl as well as each respective teams' Super Bowl record to date.
- Venue column indicates number of times that stadium has hosted a Super Bowl.
- City column indicates number of times that metropolitan area has hosted a Super Bowl.

Championships table key and summary
(1966–1969)	(1970–present)
American Football League (AFL); AFL champion^{a} (4, 2–2)	American Football Conference (AFC); AFC champion^{A} (56, 27–29)
National Football League (NFL); NFL champion^{n} (4, 2–2)	National Football Conference (NFC); NFC champion^{N} (56, 29–27)

Super Bowl championships
Game	Date (season)	Winning team	Score	Losing team	Score	Venue	City	Attendance	Referee	Ref.
I (Note: Prior to the AFL–NFL merger in 1970, the first four games were known as the "AFL–NFL World Championship Game", played between two independent professional football leagues, the AFL and the NFL. The third game, in 1969, was the first to officially bear the trademark "Super Bowl".)	Jan 15, 1967 (1966 AFL/1966 NFL)	Green Bay Packers^{n} (1, 1–0)	35	Kansas City Chiefs^{a} (1, 0–1)	10	Los Angeles Memorial Coliseum	Los Angeles, California (Note: Los Angeles, Pasadena, and Inglewood are all located in the Greater Los Angeles area.)	61,946	Norm Schachter	
II	Jan 14, 1968 (1967 AFL/1967 NFL)	Green Bay Packers^{n} (2, 2–0)	33	Oakland Raiders^{a} (1, 0–1)	14	Miami Orange Bowl	Miami, Florida (Note: The Miami Orange Bowl was in Miami proper. Joe Robbie Stadium, also in Dade County, opened in 1987 in an unincorporated area with a Miami address; the area was incorporated as Miami Gardens in 2003.)	75,546	Jack Vest	
III	Jan 12, 1969 (1968 AFL/1968 NFL)	New York Jets^{a} (1, 1–0)	16	Baltimore Colts^{n} (1, 0–1)	7	Miami Orange Bowl (2)	Miami, Florida (2)	75,389	Tom Bell	
IV	Jan 11, 1970 (1969 AFL/1969 NFL)	Kansas City Chiefs^{a} (2, 1–1)	23	Minnesota Vikings^{n} (1, 0–1)	7	Tulane Stadium	New Orleans, Louisiana	80,562	John McDonough	
V	Jan 17, 1971 (1970)	Baltimore Colts^{A} (2, 1–1)	16	Dallas Cowboys^{N} (1, 0–1)	13	Miami Orange Bowl (3)	Miami, Florida (3)	79,204	Norm Schachter	
VI	Jan 16, 1972 (1971)	Dallas Cowboys^{N} (2, 1–1)	24	Miami Dolphins^{A} (1, 0–1)	3	Tulane Stadium (2)	New Orleans, Louisiana (2)	81,023	Jim Tunney	
VII	Jan 14, 1973 (1972)	Miami Dolphins^{A} (2, 1–1)	14	Washington Redskins^{N} (1, 0–1)	7	Los Angeles Memorial Coliseum (2)	Los Angeles, California (2)	90,182	Tom Bell	
VIII	Jan 13, 1974 (1973)	Miami Dolphins^{A} (3, 2–1)	24	Minnesota Vikings^{N} (2, 0–2)	7	Rice Stadium (Note: Rice Stadium was not a home stadium to any NFL team at the time; the Houston Oilers had played there previously, but moved to the Astrodome several years prior to Super Bowl VIII.)	Houston, Texas	71,882	Ben Dreith	
IX	Jan 12, 1975 (1974)	Pittsburgh Steelers^{A} (1, 1–0)	16	Minnesota Vikings^{N} (3, 0–3)	6	Tulane Stadium (3)	New Orleans, Louisiana (3)	80,997	Bernie Ulman	
X	Jan 18, 1976 (1975)	Pittsburgh Steelers^{A} (2, 2–0)	21	Dallas Cowboys^{N} (3, 1–2) ^{[W]}	17	Miami Orange Bowl (4)	Miami, Florida (4)	80,187	Norm Schachter	
XI	Jan 9, 1977 (1976)	Oakland Raiders^{A} (2, 1–1)	32	Minnesota Vikings^{N} (4, 0–4)	14	Rose Bowl (Note: The Rose Bowl is not a home stadium to any NFL team.)	Pasadena, California (3)	103,438	Jim Tunney	
XII	Jan 15, 1978 (1977)	Dallas Cowboys^{N} (4, 2–2)	27	Denver Broncos^{A} (1, 0–1)	10	Louisiana Superdome (Note: Caesars Superdome was previously known as Mercedes-Benz Superdome, originally known as Louisiana Superdome and often simply as the Superdome.)	New Orleans, Louisiana (4)	76,400	Jim Tunney	
XIII	Jan 21, 1979 (1978)	Pittsburgh Steelers^{A} (3, 3–0)	35	Dallas Cowboys^{N} (5, 2–3)	31	Miami Orange Bowl (5)	Miami, Florida (5)	79,484	Pat Haggerty	
XIV	Jan 20, 1980 (1979)	Pittsburgh Steelers^{A} (4, 4–0)	31	Los Angeles Rams^{N} (1, 0–1)	19	Rose Bowl (2) (Note: Despite the Los Angeles Rams and Rose Bowl both being in the Greater Los Angeles area, the Rams' home stadium at the time was Los Angeles Memorial Coliseum.)	Pasadena, California (4)	103,985	Fred Silva	
XV	Jan 25, 1981 (1980)	Oakland Raiders^{A} (3, 2–1) ^{[W]}	27	Philadelphia Eagles^{N} (1, 0–1)	10	Louisiana Superdome (2)	New Orleans, Louisiana (5)	76,135	Ben Dreith	
XVI	Jan 24, 1982 (1981)	San Francisco 49ers^{N} (1, 1–0)	26	Cincinnati Bengals^{A} (1, 0–1)	21	Pontiac Silverdome	Pontiac, Michigan (Note: Pontiac, Michigan, is a suburb of Detroit.)	81,270	Pat Haggerty	
XVII	Jan 30, 1983 (1982)	Washington Redskins^{N} (2, 1–1)	27	Miami Dolphins^{A} (4, 2–2)	17	Rose Bowl (3)	Pasadena, California (5)	103,667	Jerry Markbreit	
XVIII	Jan 22, 1984 (1983)	Los Angeles Raiders^{A} (4, 3–1)	38	Washington Redskins^{N} (3, 1–2)	9	Tampa Stadium	Tampa, Florida	72,980	Gene Barth	
XIX	Jan 20, 1985 (1984)	San Francisco 49ers^{N} (2, 2–0)	38	Miami Dolphins^{A} (5, 2–3)	16	Stanford Stadium (Note: Despite the San Francisco 49ers being in the same combined statistical area as Stanford Stadium, the venue is not a home stadium to any NFL team. At the time, the 49ers played at Candlestick Park.)	Stanford, California (Note: Both Stanford and Santa Clara are part of the San Francisco Bay Area.)	84,059	Pat Haggerty	
XX	Jan 26, 1986 (1985)	Chicago Bears^{N} (1, 1–0)	46	New England Patriots^{A} (1, 0–1) ^{[W]}	10	Louisiana Superdome (3)	New Orleans, Louisiana (6)	73,818	Red Cashion	
XXI	Jan 25, 1987 (1986)	New York Giants^{N} (1, 1–0)	39	Denver Broncos^{A} (2, 0–2)	20	Rose Bowl (4)	Pasadena, California (6)	101,063	Jerry Markbreit	
XXII	Jan 31, 1988 (1987)	Washington Redskins^{N} (4, 2–2)	42	Denver Broncos^{A} (3, 0–3)	10	San Diego–Jack Murphy Stadium (Note: San Diego–Jack Murphy Stadium was also known as San Diego Stadium, Qualcomm Stadium, and SDCCU Stadium.)	San Diego, California	73,302	Bob McElwee	
XXIII	Jan 22, 1989 (1988)	San Francisco 49ers^{N} (3, 3–0)	20	Cincinnati Bengals^{A} (2, 0–2)	16	Joe Robbie Stadium (Note: Hard Rock Stadium has also been variously known over the years as Joe Robbie Stadium, Pro Player Park, Pro Player Stadium, Dolphins Stadium (with a plural "s"), Dolphin Stadium (with no "s"), Land Shark Stadium, and Sun Life Stadium.)	Miami, Florida (6)	75,129	Jerry Seeman	
XXIV	Jan 28, 1990 (1989)	San Francisco 49ers^{N} (4, 4–0)	55	Denver Broncos^{A} (4, 0–4)	10	Louisiana Superdome (4)	New Orleans, Louisiana (7)	72,919	Dick Jorgensen	
XXV	Jan 27, 1991 (1990)	New York Giants^{N} (2, 2–0)	20	Buffalo Bills^{A} (1, 0–1)	19	Tampa Stadium (2)	Tampa, Florida (2)	73,813	Jerry Seeman	
XXVI	Jan 26, 1992 (1991)	Washington Redskins^{N} (5, 3–2)	37	Buffalo Bills^{A} (2, 0–2)	24	Metrodome	Minneapolis, Minnesota	63,130	Jerry Markbreit	
XXVII	Jan 31, 1993 (1992)	Dallas Cowboys^{N} (6, 3–3)	52	Buffalo Bills^{A} (3, 0–3) ^{[W]}	17	Rose Bowl (5)	Pasadena, California (7)	98,374	Dick Hantak	
XXVIII	Jan 30, 1994 (1993)	Dallas Cowboys^{N} (7, 4–3)	30	Buffalo Bills^{A} (4, 0–4)	13	Georgia Dome	Atlanta, Georgia	72,817	Bob McElwee	
XXIX	Jan 29, 1995 (1994)	San Francisco 49ers^{N} (5, 5–0)	49	San Diego Chargers^{A} (1, 0–1)	26	Joe Robbie Stadium (2)	Miami, Florida (7)	74,107	Jerry Markbreit	
XXX	Jan 28, 1996 (1995)	Dallas Cowboys^{N} (8, 5–3)	27	Pittsburgh Steelers^{A} (5, 4–1)	17	Sun Devil Stadium	Tempe, Arizona (Note: Both Tempe and Glendale are suburbs of Phoenix, Arizona.)	76,347	Red Cashion	
XXXI	Jan 26, 1997 (1996)	Green Bay Packers^{N} (3, 3–0)	35	New England Patriots^{A} (2, 0–2)	21	Louisiana Superdome (5)	New Orleans, Louisiana (8)	72,301	Gerry Austin	
XXXII	Jan 25, 1998 (1997)	Denver Broncos^{A} (5, 1–4)^{[W]}	31	Green Bay Packers^{N} (4, 3–1)	24	Qualcomm Stadium (2)	San Diego, California (2)	68,912	Ed Hochuli	
XXXIII	Jan 31, 1999 (1998)	Denver Broncos^{A} (6, 2–4)	34	Atlanta Falcons^{N} (1, 0–1)	19	Pro Player Stadium (3)	Miami, Florida (8)	74,803	Bernie Kukar	
XXXIV	Jan 30, 2000 (1999)	St. Louis Rams^{N} (2, 1–1)	23	Tennessee Titans^{A} (1, 0–1) ^{[W]}	16	Georgia Dome (2)	Atlanta, Georgia (2)	72,625	Bob McElwee	
XXXV	Jan 28, 2001 (2000)	Baltimore Ravens^{A} (1, 1–0) ^{[W]}	34	New York Giants^{N} (3, 2–1)	7	Raymond James Stadium	Tampa, Florida (3)	71,921	Gerry Austin	
XXXVI	Feb 3, 2002 (2001)	New England Patriots^{A} (3, 1–2)	20	St. Louis Rams^{N} (3, 1–2)	17	Louisiana Superdome (6)	New Orleans, Louisiana (9)	72,922	Bernie Kukar	
XXXVII	Jan 26, 2003 (2002)	Tampa Bay Buccaneers^{N} (1, 1–0)	48	Oakland Raiders^{A} (5, 3–2)	21	Qualcomm Stadium (3)	San Diego, California (3)	67,603	Bill Carollo	
XXXVIII	Feb 1, 2004 (2003)	New England Patriots^{A} (4, 2–2)	32	Carolina Panthers^{N} (1, 0–1)	29	Reliant Stadium (Note: Reliant Stadium was also known as NRG Stadium until 2026.)	Houston, Texas (2)	71,525	Ed Hochuli	
XXXIX	Feb 6, 2005 (2004)	New England Patriots^{A} (5, 3–2)	24	Philadelphia Eagles^{N} (2, 0–2)	21	Alltel Stadium	Jacksonville, Florida	78,125	Terry McAulay	
XL	Feb 5, 2006 (2005)	Pittsburgh Steelers^{A} (6, 5–1) ^{[W]}	21	Seattle Seahawks^{N} (1, 0–1)	10	Ford Field	Detroit, Michigan (2)	68,206	Bill Leavy	
XLI	Feb 4, 2007 (2006)	Indianapolis Colts^{A} (3, 2–1)	29	Chicago Bears^{N} (2, 1–1)	17	Dolphin Stadium (4)	Miami Gardens, Florida (9)	74,512	Tony Corrente	
XLII	Feb 3, 2008 (2007)	New York Giants^{N} (4, 3–1) ^{[W]}	17	New England Patriots^{A} (6, 3–3)	14	University of Phoenix Stadium (Note: State Farm Stadium was originally known as University of Phoenix Stadium.)	Glendale, Arizona (2)	71,101	Mike Carey	
XLIII	Feb 1, 2009 (2008)	Pittsburgh Steelers^{A} (7, 6–1)	27	Arizona Cardinals^{N} (1, 0–1)	23	Raymond James Stadium (2)	Tampa, Florida (4)	70,774	Terry McAulay	
XLIV	Feb 7, 2010 (2009)	New Orleans Saints^{N} (1, 1–0)	31	Indianapolis Colts^{A} (4, 2–2)	17	Sun Life Stadium (5)	Miami Gardens, Florida (10)	74,059	Scott Green	
XLV	Feb 6, 2011 (2010)	Green Bay Packers^{N} (5, 4–1) ^{[W]}	31	Pittsburgh Steelers^{A} (8, 6–2)	25	Cowboys Stadium	Arlington, Texas	103,219	Walt Anderson	
XLVI	Feb 5, 2012 (2011)	New York Giants^{N} (5, 4–1)	21	New England Patriots^{A} (7, 3–4)	17	Lucas Oil Stadium	Indianapolis, Indiana	68,658	John Parry	
XLVII	Feb 3, 2013 (2012)	Baltimore Ravens^{A} (2, 2–0)	34	San Francisco 49ers^{N} (6, 5–1)	31	Mercedes-Benz Superdome (7)	New Orleans, Louisiana (10)	71,024	Jerome Boger	
XLVIII	Feb 2, 2014 (2013)	Seattle Seahawks^{N} (2, 1–1)	43	Denver Broncos^{A} (7, 2–5)	8	MetLife Stadium	East Rutherford, New Jersey (Note: East Rutherford, New Jersey, is part of the New York metropolitan area.)	82,529	Terry McAulay	
XLIX	Feb 1, 2015 (2014)	New England Patriots^{A} (8, 4–4)	28	Seattle Seahawks^{N} (3, 1–2)	24	University of Phoenix Stadium (2)	Glendale, Arizona (3)	70,288	Bill Vinovich	
50 (Note: Unlike other Super Bowls, Super Bowl 50's official name, as designated by the NFL, uses the Arabic numeral "50" instead of the Roman numeral "L".)	Feb 7, 2016 (2015)	Denver Broncos^{A} (8, 3–5)	24	Carolina Panthers^{N} (2, 0–2)	10	Levi's Stadium	Santa Clara, California (2)	71,088	Clete Blakeman	
LI	Feb 5, 2017 (2016)	New England Patriots^{A} (9, 5–4)	34	Atlanta Falcons^{N} (2, 0–2)	28	NRG Stadium (2)	Houston, Texas (3)	70,807	Carl Cheffers	
LII	Feb 4, 2018 (2017)	Philadelphia Eagles^{N} (3, 1–2)	41	New England Patriots^{A} (10, 5–5)	33	U.S. Bank Stadium	Minneapolis, Minnesota (2)	67,612	Gene Steratore	
LIII	Feb 3, 2019 (2018)	New England Patriots^{A} (11, 6–5)	13	Los Angeles Rams^{N} (4, 1–3)	3	Mercedes-Benz Stadium	Atlanta, Georgia (3)	70,081	John Parry	
LIV	Feb 2, 2020 (2019)	Kansas City Chiefs^{A} (3, 2–1)	31	San Francisco 49ers^{N} (7, 5–2)	20	Hard Rock Stadium (6)	Miami Gardens, Florida (11)	62,417	Bill Vinovich	
LV	Feb 7, 2021 (2020)	Tampa Bay Buccaneers^{N} (2, 2–0) ^{[W]}	31	Kansas City Chiefs^{A} (4, 2–2)	9	Raymond James Stadium (3)	Tampa, Florida (5)	24,835	Carl Cheffers	
LVI	Feb 13, 2022 (2021)	Los Angeles Rams^{N} (5, 2–3)	23	Cincinnati Bengals^{A} (3, 0–3)	20	SoFi Stadium	Inglewood, California (8)	70,048	Ron Torbert	
LVII	Feb 12, 2023 (2022)	Kansas City Chiefs^{A} (5, 3–2)	38	Philadelphia Eagles^{N} (4, 1–3)	35	State Farm Stadium (3)	Glendale, Arizona (4)	67,827	Carl Cheffers	
LVIII	Feb 11, 2024 (2023)	Kansas City Chiefs^{A} (6, 4–2)	25	San Francisco 49ers^{N} (8, 5–3)	22	Allegiant Stadium	Paradise, Nevada	61,629	Bill Vinovich	
LIX	Feb 9, 2025 (2024)	Philadelphia Eagles^{N} (5, 2–3)	40	Kansas City Chiefs^{A} (7, 4–3)	22	Caesars Superdome (8)	New Orleans, Louisiana (11)	65,719	Ron Torbert	
LX	Feb 8, 2026 (2025)	Seattle Seahawks^{N} (4, 2–2)	29	New England Patriots^{A} (12, 6–6)	13	Levi's Stadium (2)	Santa Clara, California (3)	70,823	Shawn Smith	

^{W} Indicates a team that made the playoffs as a wild card team (rather than by winning a division).

=== Upcoming games ===
Game	Date/Season	Away team	Home team	Venue	City	Ref
LXI	Feb 14, 2027 (2026) (Note: Dates for future Super Bowls are tentative pending possible changes to the NFL calendar.)	2026–27 AFC champion^{A}	2026–27 NFC champion^{N}	SoFi Stadium (2)	Inglewood, California (9)	
LXII	Feb 13, 2028 (2027)	2027–28 NFC champion^{N}	2027–28 AFC champion^{A}	Mercedes-Benz Stadium (2)	Atlanta, Georgia (4)	
LXIII	Feb 11, 2029 (2028)	2028–29 AFC champion^{A}	2028–29 NFC champion^{N}	Allegiant Stadium (2)	Paradise, Nevada (2)	
LXIV	Feb 2030 (2029)	2029–30 NFC champion^{N}	2029–30 AFC champion^{A}	New Nissan Stadium	Nashville, Tennessee	

== Streaks and rematches ==
=== Consecutive wins ===
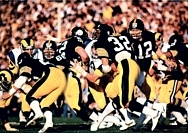
The Steelers defeated the Rams in Super Bowl XIV to win an unprecedented four championships in six years.

Eight franchises have won consecutive Super Bowls, one of which (Pittsburgh) has accomplished it twice:

- Green Bay Packers (Super Bowls I and II)
- Miami Dolphins (VII and VIII)
- Pittsburgh Steelers (twice: IX and X; XIII and XIV)
- San Francisco 49ers (XXIII and XXIV)
- Dallas Cowboys (XXVII and XXVIII)
- Denver Broncos (XXXII and XXXIII) (Note: The Broncos are the only NFL team with both consecutive wins and consecutive losses at the Super Bowl.)
- New England Patriots (XXXVIII and XXXIX)
- Kansas City Chiefs (LVII and LVIII)

Although no franchise to date has won three Super Bowls in a row, several have had eras of sustained success, nearly accomplishing a three-peat:

- The Green Bay Packers won the first two Super Bowls, and also won the NFL Championship Game the preceding year. If the Super Bowl had been instituted that year, the Packers would have qualified and faced the Buffalo Bills of the AFL.
- The Miami Dolphins appeared in three consecutive Super Bowls (VI, VII, and VIII) – winning the last two.
- The Pittsburgh Steelers won two consecutive Super Bowls (IX and X); they also won two more consecutive Super Bowls (XIII and XIV) for four titles in six seasons.
- The Dallas Cowboys won two consecutive Super Bowls (XXVII and XXVIII); the Cowboys won Super Bowl XXX the following year for three titles in four seasons.
- The New England Patriots won Super Bowls XLIX, LI, and LIII for three titles in five seasons. They also appeared in and lost Super Bowl LII to the Philadelphia Eagles following the 2017 season, giving them four Super Bowl appearances in five years.
- The Kansas City Chiefs came the closest to a three-peat, winning back-to-back Super Bowls in LVII and LVIII but losing their third consecutive appearance in LIX. They additionally won LIV several years beforehand, and lost LV, for a total of five Super Bowl appearances in six seasons.

=== Consecutive losses ===
Three franchises have lost consecutive Super Bowls:

- Buffalo Bills (4) (Super Bowls XXV, XXVI, XXVII, and XXVIII) – The only team to appear in four straight Super Bowls; they lost in all four appearances.
- Minnesota Vikings (2) (VIII and IX) – They also lost Super Bowl XI, and were knocked out of the 1975–76 playoffs by the eventual Super Bowl X losers, the Dallas Cowboys, for three losses in four seasons.
- Denver Broncos (2) (XXI and XXII) – They also lost Super Bowl XXIV, but did not qualify for the 1988–89 playoffs for Super Bowl XXIII for three losses in four seasons.

=== Consecutive appearances ===
The Buffalo Bills have the most consecutive appearances with four from 1990 to 1993. The Miami Dolphins (1971–1973), New England Patriots (2016–2018) and Kansas City Chiefs (2022–2024) are the only other teams to have at least three consecutive appearances. Including those four, 12 teams have at least two consecutive appearances. The Dallas Cowboys are the only team with three separate streaks (1970–1971, 1977–1978, and 1992–1993). The Green Bay Packers, Pittsburgh Steelers, Denver Broncos, New England Patriots, and Kansas City Chiefs have each had two separate consecutive appearances. The full listing of teams with consecutive appearances is below in order of first occurrence; winning games are in bold:

- Green Bay Packers (twice: Super Bowls **I** and **II**; **XXXI** and XXXII)
- Dallas Cowboys (thrice: V and **VI**; **XII** and XIII; **XXVII** and **XXVIII**)
- Miami Dolphins (VI, **VII**, and **VIII**)
- Minnesota Vikings (VIII and IX)
- Pittsburgh Steelers (twice: **IX** and **X**; **XIII** and **XIV**)
- Washington Redskins (**XVII** and XVIII)
- Denver Broncos (twice: XXI and XXII; **XXXII** and **XXXIII**)
- San Francisco 49ers (**XXIII** and **XXIV**)
- Buffalo Bills (XXV, XXVI, XXVII, and XXVIII)
- New England Patriots (twice: **XXXVIII** and **XXXIX**; **LI**, LII, and **LIII**)
- Seattle Seahawks (**XLVIII** and XLIX)
- Kansas City Chiefs (twice: **LIV** and LV; **LVII**, **LVIII**, and LIX)

=== Super Bowl rematches ===
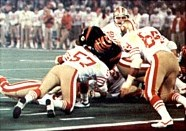
The 49ers and the Bengals, who faced off in Super Bowl XVI (pictured), would play each other again in Super Bowl XXIII.

The following teams have faced each other more than once in the Super Bowl: (Note: The New York Jets and Baltimore/Indianapolis Colts (Super Bowl III) is the only Super Bowl matchup that cannot be repeated under the current playoff alignment, as the Colts have since been placed in the AFC (at the time, along with all of the former AFL teams, including the Jets) as part of the AFL–NFL merger in 1970. For the same reason, it is the only Super Bowl rematch that is capable of being played in the postseason outside of the Super Bowl.)

- 3 times – Pittsburgh Steelers (X and XIII) vs. Dallas Cowboys (XXX) – see also Cowboys–Steelers rivalry
- 2 times – Miami Dolphins (VII) vs. Washington Redskins (XVII)
- 2 times – San Francisco 49ers (XVI and XXIII) vs. Cincinnati Bengals
- 2 times – Dallas Cowboys (XXVII and XXVIII) vs. Buffalo Bills (Note: The Dallas Cowboys and Buffalo Bills are the only NFL teams to face each other in consecutive Super Bowls, XXVII and XXVIII.)
- 2 times – New York Giants (XLII and XLVI) vs. New England Patriots – see also Giants–Patriots rivalry
- 2 times – New England Patriots (XXXIX) vs. Philadelphia Eagles (LII)
- 2 times – New England Patriots (XXXVI and LIII) vs. St. Louis / Los Angeles Rams (Note: This is the only rematch pairing in which one team relocated in the interim. The Rams represented St. Louis in Super Bowl XXXVI and Los Angeles in Super Bowl LIII.)
- 2 times – Kansas City Chiefs (LIV and LVIII) vs. San Francisco 49ers
- 2 times – Kansas City Chiefs (LVII) vs. Philadelphia Eagles (LIX)
- 2 times – New England Patriots (XLIX) vs. Seattle Seahawks (LX)

== Records by franchise ==
AFL^{a}/AFC^{A} team	NFL^{n}/NFC^{N} team
Pre-merger NFL^{n} team Post-merger AFC^{A} team (Note: Three NFL franchises, the Colts, Steelers, and Browns, were placed in the newly-formed AFC, joining the ten extant AFL franchises, when the two leagues merged in 1970. Of the three, the Colts are the only team to have qualified for the Super Bowl for both the "National" and "American" sides.)

In the sortable table below, franchises are ordered first by number of wins, followed by the total number of appearances, and finally by the total number of points scored by the franchise throughout all appearances. Included in the table are all of the team names that each franchise has had since the 1966 season, the start of the Super Bowl era.

Franchise	Wins	Losses	Win %	Points for	Points against	Appearances	Seasons (champions in bold)
Boston / New England Patriots^{A}	6	6	.500	259	311	12	1985^{A}, 1996^{A}, **2001**^{A}, **2003**^{A}, **2004**^{A}, 2007^{A}, 2011^{A}, **2014**^{A}, **2016**^{A}, 2017^{A}, **2018**^{A}, 2025^{A}
Pittsburgh Steelers^{A}	6	2	.750	193	164	8	**1974**^{A}, **1975**^{A}, **1978**^{A}, **1979**^{A}, 1995^{A}, **2005**^{A}, **2008**^{A}, 2010^{A}
San Francisco 49ers^{N}	5	3	.625	261	179	8	**1981**^{N}, **1984**^{N}, **1988**^{N}, **1989**^{N}, **1994**^{N}, 2012^{N}, 2019^{N}, 2023^{N}
Dallas Cowboys^{N}	5	3	.625	221	132	8	1970^{N}, **1971**^{N}, 1975^{N}, **1977**^{N}, 1978^{N}, **1992**^{N}, **1993**^{N}, **1995**^{N}
Kansas City Chiefs^{aA}	4	3	.571	158	190	7	1966^{a}, **1969**^{a}, **2019**^{A}, 2020^{A}, **2022**^{A}, **2023**^{A}, 2024^{A}
Green Bay Packers^{nN}	4	1	.800	158	101	5	**1966**^{n}, **1967**^{n}, **1996**^{N}, 1997^{N}, **2010**^{N}
New York Giants^{N}	4	1	.800	104	104	5	**1986**^{N}, **1990**^{N}, 2000^{N}, **2007**^{N}, **2011**^{N}
Denver Broncos^{A}	3	5	.375	147	259	8	1977^{A}, 1986^{A}, 1987^{A}, 1989^{A}, **1997**^{A}, **1998**^{A}, 2013^{A}, **2015**^{A}
Oakland / Los Angeles / Las Vegas Raiders^{aA}	3	2	.600	132	114	5	1967^{a}, **1976**^{A}, **1980**^{A}, **1983**^{A}, 2002^{A}
Washington Redskins / Football Team / Commanders^{N}	3	2	.600	122	103	5	1972^{N}, **1982**^{N}, 1983^{N}, **1987**^{N}, **1991**^{N}
Philadelphia Eagles^{N}	2	3	.400	147	144	5	1980^{N}, 2004^{N}, **2017**^{N}, 2022^{N}, **2024**^{N}
St. Louis / Los Angeles Rams^{N}	2	3	.400	85	100	5	1979^{N}, **1999**^{N}, 2001^{N}, 2018^{N}, **2021**^{N}
Miami Dolphins^{A}	2	3	.400	74	103	5	1971^{A}, **1972**^{A}, **1973**^{A}, 1982^{A}, 1984^{A}
Seattle Seahawks^{N} (Note: The Seahawks and Buccaneers each began play in 1976. For scheduling purposes, the Seahawks were placed in the NFC and the Buccaneers were placed in the AFC for their first year of play. In 1977, the two teams switched conferences, placing the Seahawks in the AFC and the Buccaneers in the NFC. In 2002, the Seahawks returned to the NFC. Neither the Seahawks nor Buccaneers played in the Super Bowl representing the AFC.)	2	2	.500	106	70	4	2005^{N}, **2013**^{N}, 2014^{N}, **2025**^{N}
Baltimore / Indianapolis Colts^{nA}	2	2	.500	69	77	4	1968^{n}, **1970**^{A}, **2006**^{A}, 2009^{A}
Tampa Bay Buccaneers^{N}	2	0	1.000	79	30	2	**2002**^{N}, **2020**^{N}
Baltimore Ravens^{A} (Note: Although the 1995 Cleveland Browns became the 1996 Baltimore Ravens, the Browns' name, brand and history remained in Cleveland and were continued by the 1999 Cleveland Browns; the Ravens, for historical purposes, are considered a separate franchise.)	2	0	1.000	68	38	2	**2000**^{A}, **2012**^{A}
Chicago Bears^{N}	1	1	.500	63	39	2	**1985**^{N}, 2006^{N}
New Orleans Saints^{N}	1	0	1.000	31	17	1	**2009**^{N}
New York Jets^{a}	1	0	1.000	16	7	1	**1968**^{a}
Buffalo Bills^{A}	0	4	.000	73	139	4	1990^{A}, 1991^{A}, 1992^{A}, 1993^{A}
Minnesota Vikings^{nN}	0	4	.000	34	95	4	1969^{n}, 1973^{N}, 1974^{N}, 1976^{N}
Cincinnati Bengals^{A}	0	3	.000	57	69	3	1981^{A}, 1988^{A}, 2021^{A}
Atlanta Falcons^{N}	0	2	.000	47	68	2	1998^{N}, 2016^{N}
Carolina Panthers^{N}	0	2	.000	39	56	2	2003^{N}, 2015^{N}
San Diego / Los Angeles Chargers^{A}	0	1	.000	26	49	1	1994^{A}
St. Louis / Phoenix / Arizona Cardinals^{N}	0	1	.000	23	27	1	2008^{N}
Houston / Tennessee Oilers / Titans^{A}	0	1	.000	16	23	1	1999^{A}
Cleveland Browns^{A}	0	0	–	–	–	0	—
Detroit Lions^{N}	0	0	–	–	–	0	—
Houston Texans^{A}	0	0	–	–	–	0	—
Jacksonville Jaguars^{A}	0	0	–	–	–	0	—

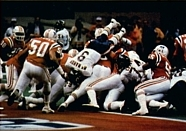
The New England Patriots played their first championship game in Super Bowl XX (pictured) where they lost to the Bears. This is the most recent Super Bowl where both teams had their first Super Bowl appearance. The Patriots hold the record for most Super Bowl appearances (12) and most losses (6) while being tied with the Steelers for most wins (6).

=== Teams with Super Bowl appearances but no victories ===
Eight teams have appeared in the Super Bowl without ever winning. In descending order of number of appearances and then years since their last appearance, they are:

- Minnesota Vikings (4) – appeared in Super Bowls IV, VIII, IX, and XI; they won the NFL Championship in 1969, the last year before the AFL–NFL merger, but failed to win the subsequent Super Bowl.
- Buffalo Bills (4) – XXV, XXVI, XXVII, and XXVIII; in 1964 and 1965, they won the last two AFL Championships before the first Super Bowl in 1966.
- Cincinnati Bengals (3) – XVI, XXIII, and LVI; an AFL expansion team in 1968, they have no pre-Super Bowl league championships.
- Carolina Panthers (2) – XXXVIII and 50; a post-merger expansion team, their first season was in 1995.
- Atlanta Falcons (2) – XXXIII and LI; an NFL expansion team in 1966, they have no pre-Super Bowl league championships.
- Los Angeles Chargers (1) – XXIX as the San Diego Chargers; their only AFL Championship was in 1963, also as the San Diego Chargers.
- Tennessee Titans (1) – XXXIV; they won the first two AFL Championships in 1960 and 1961 as the Houston Oilers.
- Arizona Cardinals (1) – XLIII; they won two NFL Championships, one in 1925 and then again in 1947, both as the Chicago Cardinals.

=== Teams with no Super Bowl appearances or long active droughts ===
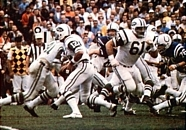
The Jets' most recent championship appearance was their victory over the Colts in Super Bowl III.

Four current teams have never reached the Super Bowl (shown in bold below). Two of them (Jacksonville and Houston) joined the NFL relatively recently, and there are an additional eight teams whose Super Bowl appearance droughts began prior to 2002 (the year Houston joined the NFL). The other two teams that have never appeared in a Super Bowl (Cleveland and Detroit) both held NFL league championships prior to Super Bowl I in the 1966 NFL season. (Note: Detroit, Houston, and Jacksonville have all hosted Super Bowls, making Cleveland the only current NFL city that has neither hosted nor had its team play in a Super Bowl.) Teams are listed below according to the length of their current Super Bowl droughts (as of the end of the 2025 season):

- **Cleveland Browns**, 60 years (Note: The Browns are officially viewed as one continuous franchise that began in 1946 as a member of the All-America Football Conference, joined the NFL in 1950, suspended operations after 1995, and resumed play in 1999.) – NFL champions four times in 1950, 1954, 1955, and 1964; appeared in seven other NFL Championship Games in 1951, 1952, 1953, 1957, 1965, 1968, and 1969; and appeared in three AFC Championship Games in the 1986, 1987, and 1989 seasons.
- **Detroit Lions**, 60 years – NFL champions four times in 1935, 1952, 1953, and 1957; appeared in one other NFL Championship Game in 1954; and appeared in two NFC Championship Games in the 1991 and 2023 seasons.
- New York Jets, 57 years – Won Super Bowl III, 1968 season (Note: The Jets and the Chiefs are the only teams to win the Super Bowl as members of the now-defunct AFL. The Jets have not appeared in the Super Bowl since joining the NFL following the AFL–NFL merger in 1970.)
- Minnesota Vikings, 49 years – Lost Super Bowl XI, 1976 season
- Miami Dolphins, 41 years – Lost Super Bowl XIX, 1984 season
- Washington Commanders, 34 years – Won Super Bowl XXVI, 1991 season (played as Washington Redskins)
- Buffalo Bills, 32 years – Lost Super Bowl XXVIII, 1993 season
- Los Angeles Chargers, 31 years – Lost Super Bowl XXIX, 1994 season (played as San Diego Chargers)
- **Jacksonville Jaguars**, 31 years – 1995 expansion team; three AFC Championship Game appearances in the 1996, 1999, and 2017 seasons.
- Dallas Cowboys, 30 years – Won Super Bowl XXX, 1995 season
- Tennessee Titans, 26 years – Lost Super Bowl XXXIV, 1999 season
- **Houston Texans**, 24 years – 2002 expansion team; Divisional Round appearances in the 2011, 2012, 2016, 2019, 2023, 2024, and 2025 seasons. They are the only NFL team to never reach the Conference Championship round.

== See also ==
- History of the NFL championship
- List of players with most Super Bowl championships
- List of AFC champions
- List of NFC champions
- List of NFL champions (1920–1969)
- List of AAFC champions
- List of Super Bowl records
- Super Bowl Most Valuable Player
- List of NFL franchise post-season droughts
- List of NFL franchise post-season streaks
