= List of players who have won the most NFL championships =

The NFL championships includes championships from the League Standings era from 1920 to 1932, the NFL Championship Game era from 1933 to 1965 and the Super Bowl era, from 1966 to the present. Many players and teams have won these championships on multiple occasions. The majority of these players were on the Green Bay Packers between 1961 and 1967, a period in which the Packers won five NFL championships including the first two Super Bowl games.

== Seven championships ==
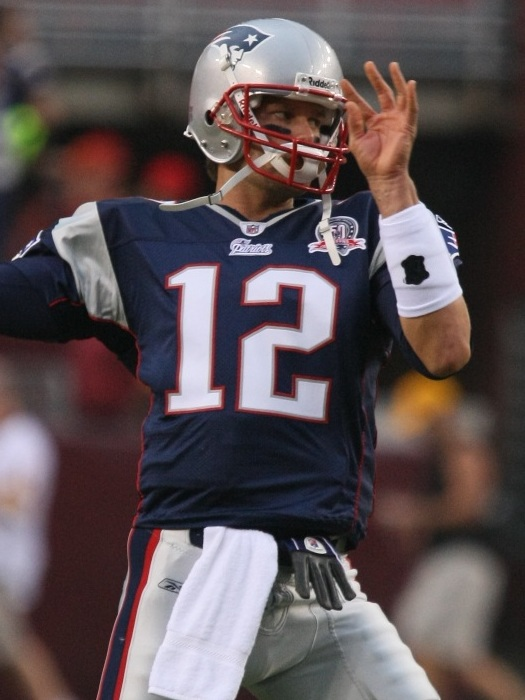
Quarterback Tom Brady has the most NFL championships, with seven

- Tom Brady (quarterback) won Super Bowls XXXVI, XXXVIII, XXXIX, XLIX, LI, and LIII with the New England Patriots after the 2001, 2003, 2004, 2014, 2016, and 2018 seasons, respectively. He won Super Bowl LV with the Tampa Bay Buccaneers after the 2020 season.

== Six championships ==
Three players have won six championships counting the pre-Super Bowl era. To avoid double counting from 1966 to 1969, only the Super Bowls from 1966 onward are counted.

- Fuzzy Thurston (offensive lineman) won the NFL championships with the Baltimore Colts in 1958, with the Green Bay Packers in 1961, 1962 and 1965, and won Super Bowls I and II with the Packers after the 1966 and 1967 seasons.
- Forrest Gregg (offensive lineman) won the NFL championships with the Green Bay Packers in 1961, 1962 and 1965, Super Bowls I and II with the Packers after the 1966 and 1967 seasons, and Super Bowl VI with the Dallas Cowboys after the 1971 season.
- Herb Adderley (defensive back) won the NFL championships with the Green Bay Packers in 1961, 1962 and 1965, Super Bowls I and II with the Packers after the 1966 and 1967 seasons, and Super Bowl VI with the Dallas Cowboys after the 1971 season.

== Five championships ==
13 players have won 5 championships counting the pre-Super Bowl era; with the exception of Charles Haley, all were from the 1960s Packers.

- Bart Starr (quarterback) won the NFL championships with the Green Bay Packers in 1961, 1962 and 1965, Super Bowls I and II with the Packers after the 1966 and 1967 seasons.
- Jerry Kramer (offensive lineman) won the NFL championships with the Green Bay Packers in 1961, 1962 and 1965, Super Bowls I and II with the Packers after the 1966 and 1967 seasons.
- Ray Nitschke (linebacker) won the NFL championships with the Green Bay Packers in 1961, 1962 and 1965, Super Bowls I and II with the Packers after the 1966 and 1967 seasons.
- Henry Jordan (defensive lineman) won the NFL championships with the Green Bay Packers in 1961, 1962 and 1965, Super Bowls I and II with the Packers after the 1966 and 1967 seasons.
- Willie Davis (defensive lineman) won the NFL championships with the Green Bay Packers in 1961, 1962 and 1965, Super Bowls I and II with the Packers after the 1966 and 1967 seasons.
- Willie Wood (defensive back) won the NFL championships with the Green Bay Packers in 1961, 1962 and 1965, Super Bowls I and II with the Packers after the 1966 and 1967 seasons.
- Max McGee (wide receiver) won the NFL championships with the Green Bay Packers in 1961, 1962 and 1965, Super Bowls I and II with the Packers after the 1966 and 1967 seasons.
- Bob Skoronski (offensive lineman) won the NFL championships with the Green Bay Packers in 1961, 1962 and 1965, Super Bowls I and II with the Packers after the 1966 and 1967 seasons.
- Elijah Pitts (running back) won the NFL championships with the Green Bay Packers in 1961, 1962 and 1965, Super Bowls I and II with the Packers after the 1966 and 1967 seasons.
- Ron Kostelnik (defensive lineman) won the NFL championships with the Green Bay Packers in 1961, 1962 and 1965, Super Bowls I and II with the Packers after the 1966 and 1967 seasons.
- Boyd Dowler (wide receiver) won the NFL championships with the Green Bay Packers in 1961, 1962 and 1965, Super Bowls I and II with the Packers after the 1966 and 1967 seasons.
- Marv Fleming (tight end) won the NFL championships with the Green Bay Packers in 1965, Super Bowls I and II with the Packers after the 1966 and 1967 seasons, and Super Bowls VII and VIII with the Dolphins after the 1972 and 1973 seasons.
- Charles Haley (defensive lineman) won Super Bowls XXIII and XXIV with the San Francisco 49ers after the 1988 and 1989 seasons, and Super Bowls XXVII, XXVIII and XXX with the Dallas Cowboys after the 1992, 1993 and 1995 seasons.

== List of players with most Super Bowl championships ==
Positions key
Offense	Defense	Special teams
QB — Quarterback; RB — Running back; FB — Fullback; WR — Wide receiver; TE — Tight end; OL — Offensive lineman; T — Tackle; G — Guard; C — Center	DL — Defensive lineman; DT — Defensive tackle (Note: Includes nose tackle (NT)); DE — Defensive end; EDGE — Edge rusher; LB — Linebacker (Note: Includes middle linebacker (MLB/MIKE), weakside linebacker (WILL), strongside linebacker (SAM), off-ball linebacker, and outside linebacker (OLB)); DB — Defensive back; CB — Cornerback; S — Safety (Note: Includes free safety (FS) and strong safety (SS))	K — Kicker (Note: Also known as a placekicker (PK)); P — Punter; LS — Long snapper; RS — Return specialist (Note: Includes kickoff and punt returners)

Denotes players who have been inducted to the Pro Football Hall of Fame
Denotes players who are currently active in the NFL

Player	Position	Seasons		Championship teams	Ref.
Player	Position	won	played	Championship teams	Ref.
Tom Brady	QB	7	23	New England Patriots (XXXVI, XXXVIII, XXXIX, XLIX, LI, LIII); Tampa Bay Buccaneers (LV)	
Charles Haley	LB	5	13	San Francisco 49ers (XXIII, XXIV); Dallas Cowboys (XXVII, XXVIII, XXX)	
Marv Fleming	TE	4	9	Green Bay Packers (I, II); Miami Dolphins (VII, VIII)	
Ted Hendricks	LB	4	15	Baltimore Colts (V); Oakland Raiders (XI, XV, XVIII)	
Rocky Bleier	RB	4	11	Pittsburgh Steelers (IX, X, XIII, XIV)	
Mel Blount	CB	4	14	Pittsburgh Steelers (IX, X, XIII, XIV)	
Terry Bradshaw	QB	4	14	Pittsburgh Steelers (IX, X, XIII, XIV)	
Larry Brown	TE/OT	4	14	Pittsburgh Steelers (IX, X, XIII, XIV)	
Sam Davis	G	4	13	Pittsburgh Steelers (IX, X, XIII, XIV)	
Steve Furness	DT/DE	4	10	Pittsburgh Steelers (IX, X, XIII, XIV)	
Joe Greene	DT	4	13	Pittsburgh Steelers (IX, X, XIII, XIV)	
L. C. Greenwood	DE	4	13	Pittsburgh Steelers (IX, X, XIII, XIV)	
Randy Grossman	TE	4	8	Pittsburgh Steelers (IX, X, XIII, XIV)	
Jack Ham	LB	4	12	Pittsburgh Steelers (IX, X, XIII, XIV)	
Franco Harris	FB	4	13	Pittsburgh Steelers (IX, X, XIII, XIV)	
Jon Kolb	OT/G	4	13	Pittsburgh Steelers (IX, X, XIII, XIV)	
Jack Lambert	LB	4	11	Pittsburgh Steelers (IX, X, XIII, XIV)	
Gerry Mullins	G	4	9	Pittsburgh Steelers (IX, X, XIII, XIV)	
Donnie Shell	S	4	14	Pittsburgh Steelers (IX, X, XIII, XIV)	
John Stallworth	WR	4	14	Pittsburgh Steelers (IX, X, XIII, XIV)	
Lynn Swann	WR	4	9	Pittsburgh Steelers (IX, X, XIII, XIV)	
J. T. Thomas	DB	4	10	Pittsburgh Steelers (IX, X, XIII, XIV)	
Loren Toews	DB	4	11	Pittsburgh Steelers (IX, X, XIII, XIV)	
Mike Wagner	S	4	10	Pittsburgh Steelers (IX, X, XIII, XIV)	
Mike Webster	C	4	17	Pittsburgh Steelers (IX, X, XIII, XIV)	
Dwight White	DE	4	10	Pittsburgh Steelers (IX, X, XIII, XIV)	
Ronnie Lott	CB/S	4	14	San Francisco 49ers (XVI, XIX, XXIII, XXIV)	
Joe Montana	QB	4	15	San Francisco 49ers (XVI, XIX, XXIII, XXIV)	
Keena Turner	LB	4	11	San Francisco 49ers (XVI, XIX, XXIII, XXIV)	
Mike Wilson	WR	4	10	San Francisco 49ers (XVI, XIX, XXIII, XXIV)	
Eric Wright	CB	4	10	San Francisco 49ers (XVI, XIX, XXIII, XXIV)	
Matt Millen	LB	4	12	Oakland Raiders (XV, XVIII); San Francisco 49ers (XXIV); Washington Redskins (XXVI)	
Jesse Sapolu	C/G	4	13	San Francisco 49ers (XIX, XXIII, XXIV, XXIX)	
Bill Romanowski	LB	4	16	San Francisco 49ers (XXIII, XXIV); Denver Broncos (XXXII, XXXIII)	
Adam Vinatieri	K	4	24	New England Patriots (XXXVI, XXXVIII, XXXIX); Indianapolis Colts (XLI)	
Rob Gronkowski	TE	4	11	New England Patriots (XLIX, LI, LIII); Tampa Bay Buccaneers (LV)	
Joe Thuney	G	4	8	New England Patriots (LI, LIII); Kansas City Chiefs (LVII, LVIII)	
