= Larry Brown (cornerback) =

American football player (born 1969)

No. 24, 34
- Position: Cornerback

Personal information
- Born: November 30, 1969 (age 56); Miami, Florida, U.S.
- Listed height: 5 ft 11 in (1.80 m)
- Listed weight: 185 lb (84 kg)

Career information
- High school: Los Angeles (Los Angeles, California)
- College: Los Angeles Southwest (1987–1988); TCU (1989–1990)
- NFL draft: 1991: 12th round, 320th overall pick

Career history
- Dallas Cowboys (1991–1995); Oakland Raiders (1996–1997); Minnesota Vikings (1998)*; Dallas Cowboys (1998)
- * Offseason or practice squad member only

Awards and highlights
- 3× Super Bowl champion (XXVII, XXVIII, XXX); Super Bowl MVP (XXX); PFWA All-Rookie Team (1991); George Halas Award (1996)

Career NFL statistics
- Tackles: 317
- Forced fumbles: 1
- Fumble recoveries: 2
- Interceptions: 14
- Defensive touchdowns: 2
- Stats at Pro Football Reference

Larry Brown Jr. (born November 30, 1969) is an American former professional football player who was a cornerback in the National Football League (NFL) for the Dallas Cowboys and Oakland Raiders. He played college football for the Los Angeles Southwest Cougars and the TCU Horned Frogs and was selected by the Cowboys in the 12th round of the 1991 NFL draft. He was named the MVP of Super Bowl XXX.

== Early life ==
Brown attended Los Angeles High School, where he earned All-city honors in football and track.

After not receiving any scholarship offers, he began his collegiate career at Los Angeles Southwest College as a running back. He was moved to cornerback during his sophomore season, receiving All-league honors after tallying 61 tackles and 4 interceptions. He also practiced track.

As a junior he transferred to Texas Christian University, and was named the starter at left cornerback, collecting 27 tackles, one interception and one pass defensed in the first five games, until being lost for the season with an ankle injury.

As a senior he regained his starter position, registering 75 tackles (fifth on the team), 2 interceptions and 10 passes defensed (led the team). He had 10 tackles against Oklahoma State University.

In 1990, he was invited to the Blue–Gray Football Classic, where he earned MVP honors, after making 9 tackles and one pass defensed.

== Professional career ==
Pre-draft measurables
| Height | Weight | Arm length | Hand span | 40-yard dash | 10-yard split | 20-yard split | 20-yard shuttle | Vertical jump | Broad jump | Bench press |
|---|---|---|---|---|---|---|---|---|---|---|
| 5 ft 11 1/8 in (1.81 m) | 181 lb (82 kg) | 30 1/2 in (0.77 m) | 8 3/4 in (0.22 m) | 4.63 s | 1.62 s | 2.72 s | 4.34 s | 30.0 in (0.76 m) | 9 ft 6 in (2.90 m) | 15 reps |
All values from NFL Combine

=== Dallas Cowboys (first stint) ===
Brown was selected by the Dallas Cowboys in the 12th round (320th overall) of the 1991 NFL draft. Although there weren't many expectations for him at the start of preseason, he surprised the coaches with his play, even though he quit training camp for a few days because of personal reasons and also had a brief hospitalization that was thought to be appendicitis. In the fourth game, he passed Manny Hendrix on the depth chart at right cornerback, becoming the first Cowboys rookie to start at cornerback since Ron Francis in 1987. He posted 68 tackles (eighth on the team), 2 interceptions, 18 passes defensed (second on the team), one forced fumble and was named to the NFL All-rookie team. In the Cowboys 52–17 win over the Buffalo Bills in Super Bowl XXVII, he recorded an interception in the second quarter.

In 1992, he played opposite to Kevin Smith, making them the youngest starting cornerback duo in the league. He had 61 tackles (sixth on the team), one interception, 11 passes defensed (led the league), 5 special teams tackles and one fumble recovery.

In 1993, he recorded 63 tackles and 11 passes defensed (tied for second on the team). In 1994, he tallied 57 tackles, 4 interceptions (third on the team) and 12 passes defensed (tied for third on the team). The 1995 season would be a great season for Brown, recording six interceptions, returning two of them for touchdowns and recording 47 tackles, en route to the Cowboys reaching and winning Super Bowl XXX, in which he earned MVP honors with two second half interceptions, which the Cowboys converted into two touchdowns to prevent a Steelers comeback.

=== Oakland Raiders ===
Brown became a free agent immediately after his Super Bowl MVP performance and used his award as leverage to sign a lucrative contract (five years, $12.5 million with $3.5 million guaranteed) with the Oakland Raiders on February 20, 1996. In 1997, he was demoted to a backup role and suspended four weeks by the team for "conduct detrimental to the team". On June 3, 1998, he was waived after being a disappointment and playing only 12 games (one start) in two years for the Raiders. Brown is believed to be one of the NFL's biggest free agent busts in NFL history.

=== Minnesota Vikings ===
On June 16, 1998, he was signed as a free agent by the Minnesota Vikings, to help improve one of the worst secondaries in the league. He was limited with a hamstring injury and was released with an injury settlement on August 30.

=== Dallas Cowboys (second stint) ===
On December 2, 1998, he returned to the Cowboys to provide depth at cornerback. He finished out the season and career playing four games for the Cowboys that season; upon his retirement, he had made 14 career interceptions, which he returned for a total of 210 yards and two touchdowns. He also had two fumble recoveries.

== Personal life ==
Currently, Brown is a cohost of The Dallas Cowboys Radio Network Pregame and Postgame Shows on 105.3 The Fan, the flagship station of the Dallas Cowboys Radio Network.

He played himself in an episode of Married... with Children. He also appeared on Weekend Update in a 1996 episode of Saturday Night Live hosted by Danny Aiello. He was named Number 3 in NFL Top 10 for Worst Free Agent Signings and Number 3 in One Shot Wonders.

Brown's son Kameron was a 4-star wide receiver in high school and is currently playing football for Texas A&M. However, on November 23, 2020, Kameron announced on Twitter that he would transfer to UCLA for the 2021 season. His son Christopher Brown died in 1995 at 10 weeks of age after being born prematurely.
