= Cowboys–Steelers rivalry =

National Football League rivalry

- Dallas Cowboys Pittsburgh Steelers
- Location: Dallas, Pittsburgh
- First meeting: September 10, 1960; Steelers 35, Cowboys 28
- Latest meeting: October 6, 2024; Cowboys 20, Steelers 17
- Next meeting: TBD (no later than 2028 regular season)
- Stadiums: Cowboys: AT&T Stadium; Steelers: Acrisure Stadium

Statistics
- Total meetings: 34
- All-time series: Cowboys: 18–16
- Regular season series: Cowboys: 17–14
- Postseason results: Steelers: 2–1
- Largest victory: Cowboys: 52–21 (1966); Steelers: 37–7 (1961)
- Most points scored: Cowboys: 52 (1966); Steelers: 37 (1961)
- Longest win streak: Cowboys: 7 (1965–1972); Steelers: 5 (1976–1982)
- Current win streak: Cowboys: 1 (2024–present)

Post–season history
- Super Bowl X: Steelers won: 21–17; Super Bowl XIII: Steelers won: 35–31; Super Bowl XXX: Cowboys won: 27–17

The Cowboys–Steelers rivalry is a National Football League (NFL) rivalry between the Dallas Cowboys and Pittsburgh Steelers.

CBS Sports ranked this rivalry No. 2 of the best NFL rivalries of the 1970s. As the Cowboys are in the NFC and the Steelers are in the AFC, they usually only meet at least once every four years and at least once every eight seasons at each team's home stadium, sometimes more often if the two teams finish in the same place in their respective divisions in the year they do not play one another but met two years prior, play in the preseason, or meet in the Super Bowl.

The Cowboys lead the overall series, 18–16. The two teams have met three times in the playoffs, with the Steelers winning two out of the three Super Bowls against the Cowboys.

== History ==
=== 1952–1960: Before the Cowboys ===
The roots to the Cowboys–Steelers rivalry can be traced several years before the Cowboys played a game, and to another team entirely. Following the 1951 NFL season, New York Yanks owner Ted Collins sold his team back to the NFL due to financial difficulties competing with the New York Giants in the same market, as well as the All-America Football Conference, in which it had played, folding just two years before and putting a severe drain on the team.

Not wanting the team to compete with the Giants in the same market, the NFL decided to move the rights to the franchise to either Dallas or Baltimore. Baltimore had previously been home to an NFL team, the original Baltimore Colts which had come over from the AAFC along with the Cleveland Browns and San Francisco 49ers, but had folded after the 1950 NFL season due to financial difficulties despite strong fan support. Dallas, and the state of Texas in general, was a true expansion market that was untapped, and the NFL owners liked the appeal that Dallas offered due to the aforementioned following of football in the state.

The NFL owners voted 10–1 to award the assets of the Yanks to the Dallas group led by Giles Miller as opposed to the Baltimore group, which became the Dallas Texans. The lone holdout was Steelers founder and owner Art Rooney. Rooney, an Irish Catholic, was more tolerant of African Americans than the other owners (most of whom were Protestant and had their own discrimination towards Catholics) and was concerned about the racism that existed in the Southern United States at the time and the subsequent civil rights movement that would take place later in the decade. Rooney's assumptions would be later proven correct: while the Texans struggled on the field, it also struggled at the gate partly because two of the team's best players, George Taliaferro and Buddy Young, were both black, which made fans in Texas automatically turn away from the team simply because of prejudice.

The Texans folded after the 1952 NFL season and their assets would be sold to Carroll Rosenbloom to form the new Baltimore Colts, which currently play in Indianapolis.

=== 1960–1969: Early years ===
After the failure of the Texans, the NFL had no plans to return to the state in the foreseeable future. However, in 1959, Lamar Hunt, the son of oil tycoon H. L. Hunt, approached the NFL about putting another expansion team in Dallas. The NFL said no, stating that the league was not expanding at the time. He then approached the Chicago Cardinals about buying the team from owner Violet Bidwill Wolfner, who ultimately decided to keep the team and whose son Bill Bidwill remains the owner (the Cardinals did move to St. Louis, Missouri for the 1960 NFL season; the team currently is based in Phoenix, Arizona; the Cowboys and Cardinals were divisional rivals from 1961–66, and again from 1970 to 2001). Due to these rebuffs, Hunt formed the American Football League with his own Dallas team, the AFL's incarnation of the Dallas Texans.

In response, the NFL suddenly reversed course and awarded an expansion team to Dallas for the 1960 season that ultimately became the Cowboys. The plan worked: although the Texans were by far the better team on the field and won the 1962 AFL Championship, due to the Cowboys being part of the more-established NFL, the Texans took their AFL Championship north to Kansas City, Missouri, where they remain as the Kansas City Chiefs.

In the meantime, the Cowboys started play in the NFL in 1960. Their first game was against the same Steelers team that voted against putting an NFL team in Dallas eight years earlier, with the Steelers coming away with a 35–28 victory at the Cotton Bowl, en route to an 0–11–1 first season for the Cowboys. The following year, the two teams met again in the season opener at the Cotton Bowl and the results would be different: the young Cowboys beat the veteran-filled Steelers 27–24, the first victory for the Cowboys in franchise history.

The two teams would head in opposite directions the rest of the decade, with the Cowboys competing for the NFL championship in 1966 and 1967 (both losses to the Vince Lombardi-led Green Bay Packers, the latter matchup in the Ice Bowl) while the Steelers would be among the NFL's worst teams, culminating in a 1–13 record in 1969 that saw the team win its season opener against the Detroit Lions, then lose every game afterwards in the first season of Hall of Fame head coach Chuck Noll. The Cowboys defeated the Steelers 10–7 at Pitt Stadium in week 12 of the 1969 season, the final meeting between the clubs before the AFL-NFL merger.

=== 1970–1979: Teams of the 1970s ===
The Steelers would be moved to the newly formed American Football Conference as a result of the AFL–NFL merger for the 1970 NFL season while the Cowboys would be placed in the National Football Conference. The Cowboys would split the first two Super Bowl matchups of the decade while the Steelers started improving and would eventually become the dynasty of the decade.

Around this time, both teams would have firm identities. Both were strong on defense with the Steelers' famed Steel Curtain defense, called a "Stunt 4–3", while the Cowboys boasted the Doomsday Defense, based around Landry's "Flex" 4–3 defense. On the offensive side of the ball brought key differences, as the Cowboys had Hall of Fame quarterback Roger Staubach and his aerial attack, as well as his reputation for fourth-quarter comebacks, earning him the nickname "Captain Comeback". The Steelers meanwhile, were powered offensively by the running game, led by Hall of Fame running back Franco Harris.

The teams met in September 1972 at Texas Stadium, with the Cowboys prevailing 17–13. The Steelers would go on to win the AFC Central division and qualify for the playoffs for the first time. In the postseason, Pittsburgh defeated the Oakland Raiders 13–7 on Franco Harris' "Immaculate Reception", but lost the AFC championship game to the eventual Super Bowl champion Miami Dolphins 21–17. Dallas qualified for the playoffs as the NFC wildcard team, where they defeated the San Francisco 49ers in the divisional round 30-28, but lost the NFC championship game to their division rivals, the Washington Redskins, 26-3.

The two had their first postseason meeting in Super Bowl X, with both teams vying to tie the Packers and Miami Dolphins for their second Super Bowl Championship. The Steelers won this game, 21–17, after safety Glen Edwards intercepted a Staubach pass in the end zone to seal the victory. The hostility was evident in the third quarter when Steelers kicker Roy Gerela missed his second field goal, a 33-yard attempt. After the miss, Cowboys safety Cliff Harris mockingly patted Gerela on his helmet and thanked him for "helping Dallas out", but was immediately shoved to the ground by Steeler linebacker Jack Lambert. Lambert could have been ejected from the game for defending his teammate, but the officials decided to allow him to remain.

After the Cowboys won Super Bowl XII, the two would meet again in Super Bowl XIII, considered one of the greatest Super Bowls ever played and consisted of a combined 20 players, coaches, and front-office administration that ended up in the Pro Football Hall of Fame, an NFL record. The Steelers would once again come victorious, holding off the Cowboys 35–31. By this point, both teams would have rabid fan bases established nationally due to prominent television exposure.

The two would meet in the regular season in 1979 at Three Rivers Stadium, a 14–3 Steelers victory that many thought would be preview of Super Bowl XIV. While the Steelers did go on to win Super Bowl XIV that season, the Los Angeles Rams crashed the party, having upset the Cowboys in the divisional round of the playoffs 21–19 in Staubach's last game en route to meeting the Steelers in Super Bowl XIV.

=== 1980–1989: Down years ===
Age eventually caught up to both teams once the 1980s hit, though both remained competitive into the middle of the decade. The highlight of the decade for this rivalry would come in the 1982 season opener at Texas Stadium, when the Steelers ended the Cowboys NFL-record 17-year season-opening winning streak with a 36–28 victory against the Cowboys.

By the middle of the decade, both teams were rebuilding. The 1986 NFL season would be the first year since the 1965 NFL season that both teams missed the playoffs, which would happen for two more years before the Steelers clinched a wild card spot in 1989. During this time, the Steelers, with a mix of aging veterans and younger players, remained competitive in the AFC Central while the wheels fell off completely in Dallas. In 1988, both Tom Landry and Chuck Noll appeared on the cover of Sports Illustrated together, asking if both coaches had lost their touch. Though both teams had young future Hall of Famers in Michael Irvin and Rod Woodson, the Cowboys and Steelers would finish 3–13 and 5–11, respectively, for 1988. New Cowboys owner Jerry Jones fired Landry after the season. Noll would retire just three seasons later after missing the playoffs by just a few games each year after his breakout 1989 wild-card spot and two playoff thrillers, a 26–23 overtime victory in Houston and a 24–23 loss at Denver.

=== 1990–present: Return to prominence ===
The Cowboys would return to prominence in the 1990s, winning three Super Bowls, while the Steelers would return to AFC Championship contention under head coach Bill Cowher. The rivalry resumed in the 1990s, but unlike the 1970s matchups that were dominated by Pittsburgh, Dallas got the upper hand this time around. The Cowboys swept all four matchups between the two teams in the decade.

The possibility of Cowboys–Steelers III for Super Bowl XXIX existed, as both teams advanced to their respective conference championships. Such a matchup would be a rematch from Week 1 of the regular season, which the Cowboys won 26–9; notably, this was the first game to air on Fox as part of the national late-window following Fox's acquisition of broadcasting rights. The Cowboys were the two-time defending Super Bowl champions, while the Steelers behind their "Blitzburgh" defense was the favorite to win the AFC. However, the favored Steelers were upset by the San Diego Chargers 17–13 while the San Francisco 49ers, who had lost in the NFC Championship game the previous two years to the Cowboys, beat the Cowboys 38–28.

Fans would only have to wait another year for Cowboys–Steelers III in the Super Bowl, as both teams advanced to Super Bowl XXX. Like the previous two matchups, the game was close, but this time favored the Cowboys, who won 27–17 after Steelers quarterback Neil O'Donnell threw two interceptions to Cowboys cornerback Larry Brown, who would be named Super Bowl MVP for his efforts.

The Steelers have won two of their three Super Bowl appearances since Super Bowl XXX (XL and XLIII, but lost XLV), while the Cowboys have not been back to the NFC Championship game since the aforementioned Super Bowl.

Since the NFL realigned in 2002, all interconference opponents, including the Cowboys and Steelers, play each other every four seasons. The teams split the four meetings since, with the Steelers winning in 2004 and 2008, and the Cowboys winning in 2012 and 2016. In the fifth meeting since realignment, 2020, the Steelers regained the upper hand by defeating the Cowboys at AT&T Stadium, 24-19. The Cowboys then won at Acrisure Stadium 20-17 in 2024.

== Season–by–season results ==
Dallas Cowboys vs. Pittsburgh Steelers Season-by-Season Results
1960s (Cowboys, 9–7)

Season	Results	Location	Overall series	Notes
1960	Steelers; 35–28	Cotton Bowl	Steelers; 1–0	Cowboys' inaugural season. Cowboys' first game as a franchise.
1961	Cowboys; 27–24	Cotton Bowl	Tied; 1–1	First win for the Cowboys in franchise history.
1961	Steelers; 37–7	Pitt Stadium	Steelers; 2-1	First win for the Cowboys in franchise history.
1962	Steelers; 30–28	Cotton Bowl	Steelers; 3-1	
1962	Cowboys; 42–27	Pitt Stadium	Steelers; 3–2	
1963	Steelers; 27–21	Pitt Stadium	Steelers; 4-2	
1963	Steelers; 24–19	Cotton Bowl	Steelers; 5–2	
1964	Steelers; 23–17	Pitt Stadium	Steelers; 6–2	
1964	Cowboys; 17–14	Cotton Bowl	Steelers; 6–3	
1965	Steelers; 22–13	Pitt Stadium	Steelers; 7–3	
1965	Cowboys; 24–17	Cotton Bowl	Steelers; 7-4	
1966	Cowboys; 52–21	Cotton Bowl	Steelers; 7-5	Cowboys lose 1966 NFL Championship Game.
1966	Cowboys; 20–7	Pitt Stadium	Steelers; 7-6	Cowboys lose 1966 NFL Championship Game.
1967	Cowboys; 24–21	Pitt Stadium	Tied; 7–7	Cowboys lose 1967 NFL Championship Game.
1968	Cowboys; 28–7	Cotton Bowl	Cowboys; 8-7	
1969	Cowboys; 10–7	Pitt Stadium	Cowboys; 9–7	The final meeting between the clubs before the AFL-NFL merger.

1970s (Steelers, 4–1)

Season	Results	Location	Overall series	Notes
1972	Cowboys; 17–13	Texas Stadium	Cowboys; 10–7	First meeting at Texas Stadium.
1975 playoffs	Steelers 21–17	Orange Bowl	Cowboys 10–8	Super Bowl X.
1977	Steelers; 28–13	Three Rivers Stadium	Cowboys; 10-9	First meeting at Three Rivers Stadium. Cowboys win Super Bowl XII.
1978 playoffs	Steelers 35–31	Orange Bowl	Tied 10–10	Super Bowl XIII.
1979	Steelers; 14–3	Three Rivers Stadium	Steelers; 11–10	Final start in the series for Roger Staubach. Steelers win Super Bowl XIV.

1980s (Steelers, 2–1)

Season	Results	Location	Overall series	Notes
1982	Steelers; 36–28	Texas Stadium	Steelers; 12–10	Steelers' win snapped the Cowboys' 18-game home winning streak and their NFL-record 17-year season-opening winning streak. Final start in the series for Steelers' QB Terry Bradshaw.
1985	Cowboys; 27–13	Texas Stadium	Steelers; 12–11	
1988	Steelers; 24–21	Three Rivers Stadium	Steelers; 13–11	Final game for Tom Landry in this series.

1990s (Cowboys, 4–0)

Season	Results	Location	Overall series	Notes
1991	Cowboys; 20–10	Texas Stadium	Steelers; 13–12	Final game for Chuck Noll in this series. Only game for Jimmy Johnson in this series. Game was played on Thanksgiving.
1994	Cowboys; 26–9	Three Rivers Stadium	Tied; 13–13	This game marked Barry Switzer's debut as Cowboys head coach. First game in series for Bill Cowher.
1995 playoffs	Cowboys 27–17	Sun Devil Stadium	Cowboys 14–13	Super Bowl XXX.
1997	Cowboys; 37–7	Three Rivers Stadium	Cowboys; 15–13	

2000s (Steelers, 2–0)

Season	Results	Location	Overall series	Notes
2004	Steelers; 24–20	Texas Stadium	Cowboys; 15–14	First start in the series for Ben Roethlisberger. Last game in this series for Bill Cowher.
2008	Steelers; 20–13	Heinz Field	Tied; 15–15	First start in the series for Tony Romo. First meeting at Heinz Field. Steelers win Super Bowl XLIII. First game in this series for Mike Tomlin.

2010s (Cowboys, 2–0)

Season	Results	Location	Overall series	Notes
2012	Cowboys; 27–24(OT)	AT&T Stadium	Cowboys; 16–15	First meeting at AT&T Stadium. Final start in the series for Tony Romo.
2016	Cowboys; 35–30	Heinz Field	Cowboys; 17–15	Cowboys QB Dak Prescott's first start in the rivalry. Tony Romo's final NFL season.

2020s (Tied, 1–1)

Season	Results	Location	Overall series	Notes
2020	Steelers; 24–19	AT&T Stadium	Cowboys; 17–16	Limited fans in attendance due to ongoing COVID-19 pandemic. Final start in the series for Ben Roethlisberger.
2024	Cowboys; 20–17	Acrisure Stadium	Cowboys; 18–16	First meeting on Sunday Night Football and first regular season prime time game since 1982.

Summary of Results

Season	Season series	at Dallas Cowboys	at Pittsburgh Steelers	Notes
Regular season	Cowboys 17–14	Cowboys 9–6	Tied 8–8	
Postseason	Steelers 2–1	N/A	N/A	Super Bowls: X, XIII, XXX
Regular and postseason	Cowboys 18–16	Cowboys 9–6	Tied 8–8	Steelers are 2–1 at neutral site games
