= Super Bowl XXX =

1996 National Football League championship game

Dallas Cowboys (1) (NFC) (12–4)	Pittsburgh Steelers (2) (AFC) (11–5)
27	17
Head coach: Barry Switzer	Head coach: Bill Cowher
	1	2	3	4	Total
DAL	10	3	7	7	27
PIT	0	7	0	10	17
- Date: January 28, 1996
- Kickoff time: 4:21 p.m. MST (UTC-7)
- Stadium: Sun Devil Stadium; Tempe, Arizona
- MVP: Larry Brown, cornerback
- Favorite: Cowboys by 13.5
- Referee: Red Cashion
- Attendance: 76,347

Ceremonies
- National anthem: Vanessa Williams, American Sign Language translation by Mary Kim Titla
- Coin toss: Joe Montana representing previous Super Bowl MVPs
- Halftime show: Diana Ross

TV in the United States
- Network: NBC
- Announcers: Dick Enberg, Phil Simms, Paul Maguire, Jim Gray, and Will McDonough
- Nielsen ratings: 46.0 (est. 94.08 million viewers)
- Market share: 68
- Cost of 30-second commercial: $1.085 million

Radio in the United States
- Network: CBS Radio
- Announcers: Jack Buck and Hank Stram

Super Bowl XXX was an American football game between the National Football Conference (NFC) champion Dallas Cowboys and the American Football Conference (AFC) champion Pittsburgh Steelers to decide the National Football League (NFL) champion for the 1995 season. The Cowboys defeated the Steelers by the score of 27–17, winning their fifth Super Bowl in team history. The game was played on January 28, 1996, at Sun Devil Stadium in Tempe, Arizona, the first time the Super Bowl was played in the Phoenix metropolitan area.

Both teams entered the game trying to tie the San Francisco 49ers for the record for most Super Bowl wins by a franchise (5). The Cowboys, who posted a 12–4 regular season record, were making their eighth Super Bowl appearance, while the Steelers, who recorded an 11–5 regular season record, were making their fifth appearance. This was also the fifth rematch between Super Bowl teams. The game was the third time the two longtime rivals had met in a Super Bowl, the most between any two NFL teams. The two teams met previously in Super Bowl X in 1975 and Super Bowl XIII in 1979, with Pittsburgh having won both games. Dallas became the first team to win three Super Bowls in four years, while Pittsburgh's defeat was their first Super Bowl loss in team history.

Dallas' Larry Brown, a 12th-round draft pick, who was still grieving the death of his infant son two and a half months prior, became the first cornerback to be named Super Bowl MVP by recording two interceptions in the second half, which the Cowboys converted into two touchdowns to prevent a Steelers comeback. Dallas built a 13–0 lead in the second quarter before Pittsburgh scored with 13 seconds left in the half to cut their deficit to 13–7. Midway through the 3rd quarter, Brown made his first interception and returned it 44 yards to the Pittsburgh 18-yard line to set up running back Emmitt Smith's 1-yard touchdown run. The Steelers then rallied to cut their deficit to 20–17 in the 4th quarter, but Brown recorded his second interception on Pittsburgh's next drive and returned it 33 yards to the Steelers' 6-yard line to set up Smith's 4-yard rushing touchdown.

The NBC television broadcast broke the record at the time for the most-watched sporting event ever on American television, and was the second-most watched television program of all time behind the final episode of M*A*S*H in 1983.

As of 2026, this is Dallas’ most recent Super Bowl victory and appearance.

== Background ==
=== Host selection process ===
Sun Devil Stadium in Tempe, Arizona, the home of the Phoenix Cardinals and the Arizona State Sun Devils was originally chosen as the venue for Super Bowl XXVII on March 13, 1990. However, the NFL pulled that game from Arizona in the midst of a large entertainment and convention boycott to protest the state's refusal to adopt the Martin Luther King Jr. Day holiday. As a compromise, however, the NFL owners reserved Super Bowl XXX for Tempe on a "preliminary" and "conditional" basis. Arizona voters approved the MLK Day holiday in November 1992. The NFL responded by formally assigning Super Bowl XXX to Tempe at their March 1993 meeting in Palm Desert, California. No others cities put in a bid or were considered for the hosting duties.

Super Bowl XXX was the last to be hosted in a stadium containing bleacher seats, and would also be the last Super Bowl to be held on a college campus, as the stadium sits on the campus of Arizona State University.

=== Dallas Cowboys ===
The Cowboys entered the 1995 regular season attempting to become the first team in NFL history to win three out of the last four Super Bowls. They had previously won Super Bowls XXVII and XXVIII but their chance of a "three-peat" (winning three consecutive championships) was thwarted when they lost the NFC Championship Game to the San Francisco 49ers, the eventual Super Bowl XXIX champions. It was the Cowboys’ eighth appearance in the Super Bowl, the most of any franchise; the Steelers tied this record in 2010 when that team advanced to Super Bowl XLV. The Patriots became the third team to reach the mark in 2014 when that team went on to win Super Bowl XLIX, and the Denver Broncos the fourth team in 2015 in Super Bowl 50.

After taking over the Cowboys in 1989, team owner/general manager Jerry Jones and head coach Jimmy Johnson rebuilt the team into a Super Bowl contender with young talent. Both had different ideas on the future personnel plans for the Cowboys, and both wanted equal credit for the team's recent success. As a result, Johnson eventually left the team after their Super Bowl XXVIII win and was replaced by former University of Oklahoma head coach Barry Switzer, who had one of the highest winning percentages of any college football coach in history, with a mark of .837.

In 1995, the Cowboys finished with a 12–4 regular season record, the best in the NFC. Pro Bowl quarterback Troy Aikman finished the regular season completing 280 out of 432 passes for 3,304 yards and 16 touchdowns, with only seven interceptions. Pro Bowl running back Emmitt Smith won his fourth and last league rushing crown in his career with 1,773 yards, and broke a league single-season record with 25 rushing touchdowns. Smith was also a reliable receiver out of the backfield, recording a career-high 62 receptions for 375 yards. Fullback Daryl Johnston added 111 rushing yards, while also catching 30 passes for 248 and scoring three touchdowns. Pro Bowl wide receiver Michael Irvin led the team in receiving with 111 catches for 1,603 yards and 10 touchdowns. Kevin Williams was another big receiving threat with 38 receptions for 613 yards, while also racking up 1,274 return yards on special teams. Pro Bowl tight end Jay Novacek had 62 receptions for 705 yards and five touchdowns. Dallas' offensive line was led by Pro Bowl selections Larry Allen, Ray Donaldson, Nate Newton, and Mark Tuinei. However, Donaldson suffered a season-ending injury late in the season and would be replaced by Derek Kennard.

Dallas' major acquisition before the season was four-time Pro Bowl cornerback Deion Sanders. Coincidentally, Sanders won the Super Bowl the year before with San Francisco. However, Sanders only played nine regular season games for the Cowboys in 1995 due to injuries, and thus only recorded 24 tackles and two interceptions for 34 yards. However, safety Darren Woodson was named to the Pro Bowl with 89 tackles and two interceptions for 46 return yards and a touchdown. Cornerback Larry Brown led the team in interceptions with six for 124 return yards and two touchdowns. Pro Bowl defensive end Charles Haley led the team in sacks with 10.5, while defensive end Chad Hennings added 5.5. Safety Brock Marion recorded six interceptions, returning them for 40 yards and a touchdown.

After starting fast at 8–1, the Cowboys hit a major bump in the road, losing big at home to the 49ers, 38–20 (they trailed 31–14 at halftime). Coincidentally, the 49ers, the previous Super Bowl champion, also suffered a blowout loss at home the prior season (40–8 to the Philadelphia Eagles). Adding insult to injury, the 49ers were without starting quarterback Steve Young and fullback William Floyd. The game was highly anticipated, with verbal exchanges between the teams during the week, and it marked the beginning of a difficult stretch for the team. The following four games resulted in two more losses for the Cowboys. However, after a narrow 21–20 win against the New York Giants, the Cowboys regained their dominating form, trouncing the Arizona Cardinals (who were playing their home games at Sun Devil Stadium) 37–13 on Christmas night in Arizona as part of Monday Night Football, and then cruising through the playoffs with convincing wins against the Philadelphia Eagles and the Green Bay Packers. Brown foreshadowed his Super Bowl XXX heroics with a key interception against Green Bay quarterback Brett Favre late in the NFC Championship Game.

=== Pittsburgh Steelers ===
Super Bowl XXX was the first time that the Steelers advanced to the league championship game since winning Super Bowl XIV and the first under head coach Bill Cowher. Cowher took over the team in 1992 after longtime head coach Chuck Noll retired after a 23-year tenure and leading the team to four Super Bowl wins. During Cowher's first year, the Steelers captured the number one AFC playoff seed with an 11–5 regular season record, but were eliminated in their first playoff game against the Buffalo Bills, 24–3. Cowher then led the Steelers into the playoffs in 1993 and 1994, but were also eliminated, including a 17–13 upset loss to the San Diego Chargers in the 1994 AFC Championship Game.

In 1995, the Steelers overcame a 3–4 start (including a 20–16 upset loss to the expansion Jacksonville Jaguars) to win eight of their final nine games and finished with an 11–5 record, the second-best in the AFC. Their offense was led by quarterback Neil O'Donnell, who completed 246 out of 416 passes for 2,970 yards and 17 touchdowns, with only seven interceptions. Pro Bowl wide receiver Yancey Thigpen was the team's leading receiver with 85 receptions for 1,307 yards and five touchdowns. Other contributors in the passing game included wide receivers Andre Hastings (48 catches for 502 yards and one touchdown) and Ernie Mills (39 receptions for 679 yards and 8 touchdowns), who both also excelled as returners on special teams. Mills gained 1,306 yards returning kickoffs, while Hastings returned 48 punts for 474 yards and a touchdown. The Steelers' rushing attack was led by Erric Pegram, who recorded 813 yards and five touchdowns, and Bam Morris, who had 559 yards and nine touchdowns. On special teams, newly acquired kicker Norm Johnson led the NFL in both field goals made (34) and field goals attempted (41), while also successfully making all 39 of his extra point attempts. Leading the offensive line was future Hall of Fame center Dermontti Dawson, who made the Pro Bowl for the third consecutive year.

The Steelers' defense ranked second in the league in total yards allowed (4,833). Pro Bowl linebacker Kevin Greene led the team with nine sacks, while another Pro Bowl linebacker, Greg Lloyd, led the team with 86 tackles, while also collecting 6.5 sacks and three interceptions. The secondary was led by Pro Bowl defensive back Carnell Lake and Willie Williams, who led the team with seven interceptions and 122 return yards. The secondary also featured future Hall of Fame defensive back Rod Woodson, who missed almost the entire season with a knee injury, but healed quickly enough to return in time for the playoffs. He is still the only NFL player to suffer and return from a torn ACL and still play in the same season.

=== Playoffs ===
The Cowboys first defeated the Philadelphia Eagles, 30–11. The score was tied 3–3 into the 2nd quarter, until Dallas scored 27 consecutive points to put the game out of reach. First, Deion Sanders scored a 21-yard touchdown on an end-around play. Emmitt Smith then capped off a 79-yard drive with a 1-yard touchdown run before halftime. Kicker Chris Boniol later scored two field goals in the 3rd quarter, and Troy Aikman completed a 9-yard touchdown pass to Michael Irvin in the 4th quarter, giving the Cowboys a commanding 30–3 lead. Meanwhile, Eagles quarterback Randall Cunningham was limited to just 11 of 26 completions for 161 yards and no touchdowns, with one interception. Philadelphia could only score a single field goal and Cunningham's meaningless 4-yard touchdown run late in the 4th quarter.

Dallas then advanced to their fourth consecutive NFC Championship Game, where they faced the Green Bay Packers, who had eliminated the San Francisco 49ers in the other NFC Divisional Playoff Game. Dallas jumped to an early 14–3 lead with a pair of first quarter touchdown passes from Aikman to Irvin. However, Packers quarterback Brett Favre threw two touchdowns to take a 17–14 lead midway through the second quarter: a 73-yard strike to wide receiver Robert Brooks and a 24-yard pass to tight end Keith Jackson. Dallas stormed right back with a Boniol field goal, and a record 99-yard drive to score on Smith's 1-yard touchdown run, giving them a 24–17 halftime lead. In the third quarter, Green Bay regained the lead, 27–24 with a field goal and another touchdown pass from Favre to Brooks. However, Dallas scored two unanswered touchdowns in the fourth quarter to put the game away, 38–27. A 90-yard drive was capped with Smith's second touchdown run. On Green Bay's ensuing drive, Larry Brown intercepted a pass from Favre and returned it 28 yards to set up Smith's third touchdown run. Smith finished the game with 150 rushing yards and three touchdowns, while also catching two passes for 17 yards. Aikman threw for 255 yards and two touchdowns, with no interceptions. Irvin caught seven passes for 100 yards and two touchdowns.

For the Steelers, they started their playoff run with a 40–21 win over the Buffalo Bills. Pittsburgh dominated the Bills right from the start, building up a 23–7 halftime lead. Buffalo scored two touchdowns in the second half, but Bam Morris's two rushing touchdowns in the fourth quarter ended any thoughts of a Bills comeback. The Steelers' defense limited Buffalo's Jim Kelly to just 135 passing yards and one touchdown, while intercepting him three times. Bills running back Thurman Thomas, who had rushed for 158 yards and caught three passes for 42 yards in Buffalo's wild card playoff win over the Miami Dolphins, was held to just 46 rushing yards and 12 receiving yards. Meanwhile, Morris rushed for 106 yards and two touchdowns, while kicker Norm Johnson made four field goals.

Pittsburgh then narrowly defeated the Indianapolis Colts, 20–16 to advance to their first Super Bowl since the 1979 season. In the second quarter, Neil O'Donnell's controversial 5-yard touchdown pass to Kordell Stewart gave Pittsburgh a 10–6 halftime lead (replays showed that Stewart stepped on the end line before making the catch, which would have made him ineligible). Stewart later said after the game: "I was hit in the end zone for pass interference earlier but (the refs) didn't throw a flag, so what goes around comes around." After the teams exchanged field goals in the third quarter, Indianapolis quarterback Jim Harbaugh threw a 47-yard touchdown pass to wide receiver Floyd Turner to give the Colts a 16–13 lead in the fourth quarter. The Steelers drove 67 yards on their final drive (keyed by a 4th down-and-3 conversion and a 37-yard pass play from O'Donnell to Ernie Mills) to score the go-ahead touchdown on a 1-yard run by Morris with 1:34 left. Mills broke up what would have been a game-clinching interception by Colts linebacker Quentin Coryatt several plays earlier. The Colts responded by driving to the Steelers 29-yard line, and on the game's final play, Harbaugh threw a Hail Mary intended for wide receiver Aaron Bailey in the end zone. Bailey attempted to make a diving catch, but the pass was batted away at the last second by Randy Fuller and ruled incomplete.

== Broadcasting ==
The game was broadcast in the United States by NBC, including local NBC stations KXAS-TV in Dallas and WPXI-TV in Pittsburgh. The broadcast featured play-by-play announcer Dick Enberg and color commentators Phil Simms, Paul Maguire, and Jim Gray and Will McDonough on the sidelines. Greg Gumbel hosted all of the events with the help of NBC analysts Ahmad Rashad, Mike Ditka, Joe Gibbs, and Joe Montana. The Vince Lombardi Trophy presentation that year began a tradition which continues today, in which it is held on the field instead of inside the winners' locker room as was the case previously. NBC went on to purchase KXAS which aired all three of the Cowboys' 1990s Super Bowl victories.

For the Super Bowl lead-out program, NBC broadcast an hour-long episode of Friends, "The One After the Superbowl", restarting a trend in which the prized post-Super Bowl time slot was given to an established program. Previously, networks typically used the occasion to premiere a new show, with little success. Of the new series premiering after the Super Bowl from 1983 to 1995, only The A-Team (NBC, after Super Bowl XVII), The Wonder Years (ABC, after XXII), and Homicide: Life on the Street (NBC, after XXVII) had lengthy runs.

The radio broadcast was carried by CBS Radio, with Jack Buck and Hank Stram announcing. It was Buck's last NFL broadcast. Super Bowl XXX was broadcast to over 150 countries including Australia on Network Ten, Canada on CTV, Germany on Tele 5, Mexico on Canal 5, the Philippines on the GMA Network, and the United Kingdom on Channel 4.

Due to the fact that the game's Roman numeral, XXX, is usually associated with pornography, a number of internet filters blocked web sites for the event. This was one of the early cases of a web filter problem. Super Bowl XXX is the subject of the NFL's Greatest Games episode Duel in the Desert, based on the Super Bowl highlight film with the same name, which was narrated by Earl Mann.

== Entertainment ==
=== Pregame ceremonies ===
The pregame show featured dancers in celebration of the culture of Native Americans in the United States, the traditions of the American Old West, and the great outdoors. Actress and singer Vanessa Williams sang the national anthem. After the anthem to honor the 10th anniversary of the Challenger disaster, a group of F-16 Fighting Falcons from the U.S. Air Force performed the missing man formation.

Honoring the 30th Super Bowl game, several past Super Bowl MVPs joined the coin toss ceremony (similar to 10 years earlier in Super Bowl XX, and then repeated every 10 years thereafter in Super Bowl XL and Super Bowl 50). Joe Montana, MVP of Super Bowls XVI, XIX, and XXIV, tossed the coin.

=== Halftime show ===
Diana Ross performed during the halftime show, titled "Take Me Higher: A Celebration of 30 years of the Super Bowl". The show featured a number of her songs along with pyrotechnics, special effects, and stadium card stunts. The show ended with Ross singing "Take Me Higher" from her 1995 nineteenth studio album of the same name, and she left the field in a helicopter.

== Game summary ==
=== First quarter ===
As the designated home team in the annual rotation between AFC and NFC teams, the Steelers elected to wear their home black uniforms with gold pants, while the Cowboys wore their home white uniforms with silver pants. This uniform matchup was also featured in Dallas and Pittsburgh's two prior Super Bowl meetings, with Pittsburgh as the "home" team in X and Dallas as the "home" team in XIII.

Super Bowl XXX began with Dallas wide receiver Kevin Williams returning the opening kickoff 18 yards to the 29-yard line. On the Cowboys' first possession, quarterback Troy Aikman completed a 20-yard pass on second down to wide receiver Michael Irvin, which was followed by a 23-yard rush by running back Emmitt Smith to advance to the Pittsburgh 28-yard line. The run would be Smith's longest of the day (as well as his longest run on a grass field the entire season) and the longest for either team. On 3rd-and-8 from the 26-yard line, Williams could only gain 2 yards on a reverse play, forcing Dallas to settle for a 42-yard Chris Boniol field goal.

On the Steelers' first possession, the Dallas defense forced a three-and-out and subsequent punt, which Cowboys cornerback Deion Sanders returned 11 yards to the 25-yard line. After two Smith runs, Aikman completed two quick passes, the first to Irvin for an 11-yard gain and the second to Sanders (who was brought in on offense as an extra receiver) for 47 yards. Sanders became the only player in Super Bowl history to record a Super Bowl interception on defense and a reception on offense (he recorded an interception as a member of the 49ers a year earlier in Super Bowl XXIX). Four plays later, Aikman completed a 3-yard touchdown pass to tight end Jay Novacek (playing in what would be his last game, as Novacek missed the following season due to back injuries before retiring), increasing Dallas' lead to 10–0. It was the second Super Bowl in which Novacek scored Dallas's first touchdown (he also scored their first touchdown in Super Bowl XXVII).

After the Steelers managed to advance to the Dallas 36-yard line on their ensuing drive, the possession fell apart due to a miscue by center Dermontti Dawson. Pittsburgh had lined up in the shotgun formation, and Dawson's snap sailed over quarterback Neil O'Donnell's head. O'Donnell managed to recover the fumble, but the Steelers were unable to recover from the 13-yard loss, and they had to punt two plays later.

=== Second quarter ===
After the punt, Dallas drove to the Steelers' 24-yard line. However, a pass interference penalty on Irvin nullified a 24-yard touchdown reception and moved the ball back to the 34-yard line. On the next play, Aikman completed a 19-yard pass to Novacek, bringing up second down and 1 from the 15-yard line. However, the Steelers' defense stopped Smith for no gain on the next play, and then tackled him for a 3-yard loss on third down. Boniol then kicked a 35-yard field goal, increasing Dallas' lead to 13–0.

After an exchange of punts, Steelers wide receiver Andre Hastings returned John Jett's punt 11 yards to the Pittsburgh 46-yard line. After O'Donnell's first-down pass fell incomplete, Dallas linebacker Charles Haley then sacked the Steelers quarterback for a 10-yard loss, forcing third down and 20. O'Donnell's next pass was a 19-yard completion to Hastings, and then a 3-yard run on fourth down by wide receiver/backup quarterback Kordell Stewart netted a first down. Nine plays later, O'Donnell threw a 6-yard touchdown pass to wide receiver Yancey Thigpen with just 13 seconds left in the half, cutting Pittsburgh's deficit to 13–7.

=== Third quarter ===
After the third quarter began with another exchange of punts, the Steelers advanced the ball to their own 48-yard line. However, on third down, Cowboys cornerback Larry Brown intercepted O'Donnell's pass at the Dallas 38-yard line and returned it 44 yards to the Pittsburgh 18-yard line. Aikman then completed a 17-yard pass to Irvin to reach the 1-yard line, setting up a 1-yard touchdown run by Smith to increase Dallas' lead to 20–7.

On their next drive, the Steelers faced second down and 2 on their own 47-yard line but turned the ball over on downs after running back Bam Morris was tackled for no gain on three consecutive running plays: a draw play to the left, a run to the left, and one to the middle. The Steelers defense held, however, forcing Dallas into a three-and-out; after a 6-yard run by Smith and an incompletion, Aikman's third-down pass was broken up by defensive back Rod Woodson (who had missed most of the season due to a knee injury), forcing the Cowboys to punt.

=== Fourth quarter ===
On their next drive, the Steelers advanced from their own 20-yard line to the Dallas 19. However, Dallas defensive end Tony Tolbert sacked O'Donnell on third down for a 9-yard loss, one of four Dallas sacks in the game, forcing Pittsburgh to settle for kicker Norm Johnson's 46-yard field goal with 11:20 left in the game, cutting the deficit to 20–10.

On the ensuing kickoff, Pittsburgh surprised the Cowboys by executing a successful onside kick, with defensive back Deon Figures recovering the ball for Pittsburgh at their own 47-yard line. O'Donnell hit Hastings on two consecutive passes for 23 total yards. His next pass went to wide receiver Ernie Mills for 7 yards, and then Morris ran for 5 yards and caught a pass for a 6-yard gain to the Dallas 11-yard line. Three plays later, Morris scored on a 1-yard touchdown run, cutting Pittsburgh's deficit to 20–17.

With the aid of linebacker Levon Kirkland's 8-yard sack of Aikman, the Cowboys were forced to punt on their next drive, and Pittsburgh regained possession of the ball at their own 32-yard line with 4:15 remaining, giving them the opportunity to start a game-winning drive. However, on second down, Brown intercepted another O'Donnell pass and returned it 33 yards to the Steelers' 6-yard line. The play was a mirror image of O'Donnell's first interception to Brown; a throw in the right flat thrown under a heavy Cowboys blitz into the arms of Brown with no Steelers receiver in sight. After the game, O'Donnell said that he was throwing in the spot he expected receiver Corey Holliday to be on the second interception, saying that he expected Holliday to make an out-cut instead of an in-cut. Mills responded by questioning why O'Donnell would throw to a spot and not a man in a Super Bowl. Brown said he was all alone on both picks because he expected O'Donnell to throw to the outside to seemingly get rid of the ball amidst the Cowboys' blitz.

Two plays following the interception, Smith scored once again with 3:43 left in the game, increasing the Cowboys' lead to 27–17. Despite being held to 49 yards on the ground and only 9 in the second half, Smith scored the game-clinching touchdown by making a devastating cutback on Kirkland, the best player on Pittsburgh's defense that day. The Steelers responded by driving to the Cowboys' 40-yard line, but after O'Donnell threw four consecutive incompletions, Pittsburgh turned the ball over on downs with 1:42 left in the game, sealing Dallas' victory. After that, Dallas ran out most of the clock with three quarterback kneels and an intentional delay of the game penalty before punting the ball back to the Steelers. Pittsburgh regained possession of the ball with three seconds remaining, but O'Donnell's Hail Mary pass was intercepted by Dallas safety Brock Marion on the final play of the game.

The Steelers had outgained the Cowboys in total yards, 310–254 (201–61 in the second half), had 25 first downs compared to the Cowboys' 15, and limited Dallas' powerful running attack to just 56 yards. However, they were unable to overcome O'Donnell's interceptions, which led to two Cowboys touchdowns. The irony of the game was that O'Donnell entered Super Bowl XXX as the NFL's all-time leader in fewest interceptions per pass attempt.

Troy Aikman finished the game with 15 out of 23 completions for 209 yards and a touchdown (Aikman became just the third quarterback to win three Super Bowl games; Terry Bradshaw and Joe Montana each won four). Smith was the Cowboys' leading rusher with 49 yards and 2 rushing touchdowns (Smith became just the fifth player to score a touchdown in three Super Bowl games, joining Lynn Swann, Franco Harris, Thurman Thomas, and Jerry Rice; he also became the first player to rush for two touchdowns in two Super Bowls). Irvin was Dallas' top receiver with 5 catches for 76 yards. Novacek caught 5 passes for 50 yards and a touchdown. Defensive end Chad Hennings recorded 2 of the 4 Dallas sacks in the game. The Dallas defense did not allow a play from scrimmage longer than 20 yards.

Although his 3 interceptions were costly, O'Donnell recorded 28 of 49 completions for 239 yards and a touchdown. Morris was the top rusher of the game with 73 yards and a touchdown, and also caught 3 passes for 18 yards. Hastings was the top receiver of the game with 10 receptions for 98 yards and returned 2 punts for 18 yards. Mills caught 8 passes for 78 yards and gained 79 yards on 4 kickoff returns, giving him 157 total yards. A knee injury he sustained in the fourth quarter would keep him out for most of the 1996 season.

=== Since the Super Bowl ===
Charles Haley became the first player to win five Super Bowl championships, winning two with San Francisco (XXIII and XXIV) and two previously with Dallas (XXVII and XXVIII). Barry Switzer became the second head coach, after former Cowboys and University of Miami head coach Jimmy Johnson, to win a college football national championship (University of Oklahoma 1974, 1975, 1985) and a Super Bowl title. Only one other coach has since equaled the feat: Pete Carroll (USC and Seattle).

After a many-year-long tradition of presenting the Vince Lombardi Trophy to the winning team in its locker room after the game, the NFL began the tradition of presenting the trophy on the field.

The outcome of the game had rather large ramifications for two soon-to-be free agents after their performances. Larry Brown, who was named Super Bowl MVP for his two interceptions, parlayed his performance into a lucrative free agent contract with the Oakland Raiders. However, he was not very effective and was cut from the team after two injury-plagued seasons. Neil O'Donnell left the Steelers in the offseason and signed a long-term free agent contract with the New York Jets, accepting New York's more lucrative offer. O'Donnell's tenure in New York, like Brown's in Oakland, was plagued by injuries and ineffective play, and he was released from his contract following the 1997 season. Both players finished their careers as backups, Brown returning to the Cowboys in 1998 and O'Donnell playing for the Cincinnati Bengals and Tennessee Titans until his retirement in 2003.

Both teams posted 10–6 records in 1996 and won their opening playoff games by sizable margins before losing in the divisional round of the NFL playoffs. Pittsburgh reached the AFC Championship Game in 1997 before most of the team's nucleus was broken up during the 1998 and 1999 off-seasons. Coach Bill Cowher and defensive back Willie Williams were the team's lone links to be a part of the Super Bowl XL championship team. The team acquired running back Jerome Bettis in the 1996 offseason after releasing Morris for possession of illegal drugs months after Super Bowl XXX. Pittsburgh eventually reclaimed the record for most Vince Lombardi Trophies with six, following their victory in Super Bowl XLIII.

Super Bowl XXX served as the final Super Bowl victory for the Cowboys' dynasty of the 1990s. Dallas won only one more postseason game until 2009. In addition, the Cowboys have not reached the NFC Championship Game since winning Super Bowl XXX, the fourth longest active Conference Championship appearance drought in the NFL (not including the Houston Texans who have never appeared in a Conference Championship Game but have only been a franchise since 2002). Injuries forced Michael Irvin and fullback Daryl Johnston to retire after the 1999 season, and Aikman also retired due to injuries one year later. Smith became the NFL's all-time leading rusher in 2002 before he was released by the team after that season. Statistically, 1995 was the best season for the Cowboys' triplets, although all three have said that the 1995 Super Bowl was easily the toughest of the three Super Bowl runs. The Cowboys also became the first team to win Super Bowls under three head coaches (Tom Landry in Super Bowls VI and XII, Jimmy Johnson in Super Bowls XXVII and XXVIII, and Switzer). Two other teams have since won Super Bowl championships under three coaches, with the Green Bay Packers winning under Vince Lombardi, Mike Holmgren, and Mike McCarthy, and the Pittsburgh Steelers winning under Chuck Noll, Cowher, and Mike Tomlin.

=== Box score ===
Super Bowl XXX: Dallas Cowboys 27, Pittsburgh Steelers 17

Quarter	1	2	3	4	Total
Cowboys (NFC)	10	3	7	7	27
Steelers (AFC)	0	7	0	10	17

at Sun Devil Stadium, Tempe, Arizona

- Date: January 28, 1996
- Game time: 4:21 p.m. MST
- Game weather: 68 °F (20 °C), sunny

Scoring summary

Quarter	Time	Drive			Team	Scoring information	Score	
Quarter	Time	Plays	Yards	TOP	Team	Scoring information	DAL	PIT
1	12:05	7	47	2:55	DAL	42-yard field goal by Chris Boniol	3	0
1	5:23	8	75	4:35	DAL	Jay Novacek 3-yard touchdown reception from Troy Aikman, Boniol kick good	10	0
2	6:03	14	62	8:44	DAL	35-yard field goal by Boniol	13	0
2	0:13	13	54	3:39	PIT	Yancey Thigpen 6-yard touchdown reception from Neil O'Donnell, Norm Johnson kick good	13	7
3	6:42	2	18	0:36	DAL	Emmitt Smith 1-yard touchdown run, Boniol kick good	20	7
4	11:20	11	52	4:13	PIT	46-yard field goal by Johnson	20	10
4	6:36	9	52	4:44	PIT	Bam Morris 1-yard touchdown run, Johnson kick good	20	17
4	3:43	2	6	0:18	DAL	Smith 4-yard touchdown run, Boniol kick good	27	17
"TOP" = time of possession. For other American football terms, see Glossary of American football.							27	17

== Final statistics ==
Sources: NFL.com Super Bowl XXX, Super Bowl XXX Play Finder Dal, Super Bowl XXX Play Finder Pit

=== Statistical comparison ===
	Dallas Cowboys	Pittsburgh Steelers
First downs	15	25
First downs rushing	5	9
First downs passing	10	15
First downs penalty	0	1
Third down efficiency	2/10	9/19
Fourth down efficiency	1/1	2/4
Net yards rushing	56	103
Rushing attempts	25	31
Yards per rush	2.2	3.3
Passing – Completions/attempts	15/23	28/49
Times sacked-total yards	2–11	4–32
Interceptions thrown	0	3
Net yards passing	198	207
Total net yards	254	310
Punt returns-total yards	1–11	2–18
Kickoff returns-total yards	3–37	5–96
Interceptions-total return yards	3–77	0–0
Punts-average yardage	5–38.2	4–44.8
Fumbles-lost	0–0	2–0
Penalties-total yards	4–25	2–15
Time of possession	26:11	33:49
Turnovers	0	3

=== Individual statistics ===
Cowboys passing
	C/ATT^{1}	Yds	TD	INT	Rating
Troy Aikman	15/23	209	1	0	108.8
Cowboys rushing
	Car^{2}	Yds	TD	LG^{3}	Yds/Car
Emmitt Smith	18	49	2	23	2.72
Daryl Johnston	2	8	0	4	4.00
Kevin Williams	1	2	0	2	2.00
Troy Aikman	4	–3	0	0	–0.75
Cowboys receiving
	Rec^{4}	Yds	TD	LG^{3}	Target^{5}
Michael Irvin	5	76	0	20	10
Jay Novacek	5	50	1	19	6
Kevin Williams	2	29	0	22	3
Deion Sanders	1	47	0	47	1
Daryl Johnston	1	4	0	4	2
Emmitt Smith	1	3	0	3	1

Steelers passing
	C/ATT^{1}	Yds	TD	INT	Rating
Neil O'Donnell	28/49	239	1	3	51.3
Steelers rushing
	Car^{2}	Yds	TD	LG^{3}	Yds/Car
Bam Morris	19	73	1	15	3.84
Erric Pegram	6	15	0	4	2.50
Kordell Stewart	4	15	0	7	3.75
Neil O'Donnell	1	0	0	0	0.00
John L. Williams	1	0	0	0	0.00
Steelers receiving
	Rec^{4}	Yds	TD	LG^{3}	Target^{5}
Andre Hastings	10	98	0	19	17
Ernie Mills	8	78	0	17	10
Yancey Thigpen	3	19	1	7	6
Bam Morris	3	18	0	10	3
Corey Holliday	2	19	0	10	3
John L. Williams	2	7	0	5	4
Kordell Stewart	0	0	0	0	3
Erric Pegram	0	0	0	0	1
Mark Bruener	0	0	0	0	1
Jonathan Hayes	0	0	0	0	1

^{1}Completions/attempts ^{2}Carries ^{3}Long gain ^{4}Receptions ^{5}Times targeted

=== Records set ===
The following records were set in Super Bowl XXX, according to the official NFL.com boxscore and the ProFootball reference.com game summary.
Some records have to meet NFL minimum number of attempts to be recognized. The minimums are shown (in parentheses).

Records Set
Most Super Bowl appearances	8	Cowboys
Highest completion percentage, career, (40 attempts)	70% (56–80)	Troy Aikman (Dallas)
Most rushing touchdowns, career	5	Emmitt Smith (Dallas)
Most interception yards gained, game	77	Larry Brown (Dallas)
Most interception yards gained, career	77	Larry Brown (Dallas)
Records Tied
Most Super Bowl victories	5	Cowboys
Fewest turnovers, game	0	Cowboys
Most rushing touchdowns, game	2	Emmitt Smith (Dallas)
Most interceptions, career	3	Larry Brown (Dallas)

Turnovers are defined as the number of times losing the ball on interceptions and fumbles.

Record tied, both team totals
	Total	Cowboys	Steelers
Fewest fumbles lost	0	0	0

== Starting lineups ==
Hall of Fame‡

Dallas	Position	Position	Pittsburgh
Offense
Kevin Williams	WR		Yancey Thigpen
Mark Tuinei	LT		John Jackson
Nate Newton	LG		Tom Newberry
Derek Kennard	C		Dermontti Dawson‡
Larry Allen‡	RG		Brenden Stai
Erik Williams	RT		Leon Searcy
Jay Novacek	TE		Mark Bruener
Michael Irvin‡	WR		Ernie Mills
Troy Aikman‡	QB		Neil O'Donnell
Emmitt Smith‡	RB		Erric Pegram
Daryl Johnston	FB		John L. Williams
Defense
Tony Tolbert	LE		Brentson Buckner
Russell Maryland	LT	NT	Joel Steed
Leon Lett	RT	RE	Ray Seals
Charles Haley‡	RE	LOLB	Kevin Greene‡
Dixon Edwards	SLB	LILB	Levon Kirkland
Robert Jones	MLB	RILB	Chad Brown
Darrin Smith	WLB	ROLB	Greg Lloyd
Deion Sanders‡	LCB		Willie Williams
Larry Brown	RCB		Carnell Lake
Darren Woodson	SS		Myron Bell
Brock Marion	FS		Darren Perry

== Officials ==
- Referee: Red Cashion #43 second Super Bowl (XX)
- Umpire: John Keck #67 first Super Bowl on field (alternate for XV, XXVII)
- Head linesman: Paul Weidner #87 first Super Bowl
- Line judge: Dale Orem #51 first Super Bowl
- Back judge: Dick Creed #61 second Super Bowl (XXVI)
- Side judge: Bill Carollo #63 first Super Bowl
- Field judge: Don Hakes #96 second Super Bowl (XVI)
- Alternate referee: Bernie Kukar #86
- Alternate umpire: Hendi Ancich #115 (umpire for XXIV)

== Popular culture ==
A portion of this Super Bowl was "predicted" six years earlier by NBC series Quantum Leap. In the January 17, 1990 episode "All Americans", Al (Dean Stockwell) says in conversation with Sam (Scott Bakula), "I've been watching Super Bowl XXX. Ooo, Sam, the Steelers are down by 3. You wouldn't believe..." The Steelers were the AFC team in the game. They trailed by 3 twice in the game: unremarkably, early in the second quarter (3–0); but again at the critical turning point late in the 4th quarter (20–17) that ultimately gave the Cowboys the win and would lend credence to Al's suspense at the game's ending.

Several characters in the 1996 Elmore Leonard crime novel Out of Sight watch the game on TV, with one betting on it.

In the third episode of the first season of Better Call Saul, "Nacho", Mike Ehrmantraut mentioned a case when he was a police officer in Philadelphia that a bookie took six million dollars in bets for this game and disappeared after losing the bet.
