= Super Bowl XXVII =

1993 edition of the Super Bowl

Buffalo Bills (4) (AFC) (11–5)	Dallas Cowboys (2) (NFC) (13–3)
17	52
Head coach: Marv Levy	Head coach: Jimmy Johnson
	1	2	3	4	Total
BUF	7	3	7	0	17
DAL	14	14	3	21	52
- Date: January 31, 1993
- Kickoff time: 3:25 p.m. PST (UTC-8)
- Stadium: Rose Bowl; Pasadena, California
- MVP: Troy Aikman, quarterback
- Favorite: Cowboys by 6.5
- Referee: Dick Hantak
- Attendance: 98,374

Ceremonies
- National anthem: Garth Brooks
- Coin toss: O. J. Simpson
- Halftime show: Michael Jackson

TV in the United States
- Network: NBC
- Announcers: Dick Enberg, Bob Trumpy, O. J. Simpson and Todd Christensen
- Nielsen ratings: 45.1 (est. 90.99 million viewers)
- Market share: 66
- Cost of 30-second commercial: $850,000

Radio in the United States
- Network: CBS Radio
- Announcers: Jack Buck and Hank Stram

Super Bowl XXVII was an American football game between the American Football Conference (AFC) champion Buffalo Bills and the National Football Conference (NFC) champion Dallas Cowboys to decide the National Football League (NFL) champion for the 1992 season. The Cowboys defeated the Bills by the score of 52–17, winning their third Super Bowl in team history, and their first in fifteen years. This game is tied with Super Bowl XXXVII as the fourth-highest scoring Super Bowl with 69 combined points, as of 2024. The Bills became the second of four teams to play in three consecutive Super Bowls, as well as the first team to lose three straight. The game was played on January 31, 1993, at the Rose Bowl in Pasadena, California, and is the last NFL championship game to date to be held in a non-NFL stadium. It was also the seventh Super Bowl held in the Greater Los Angeles Area, which did not host another until Super Bowl LVI in 2022.

The Bills advanced to their third consecutive Super Bowl after posting an 11–5 regular season record, but entered the playoffs as a wild card after losing tiebreakers. The Cowboys were making their sixth Super Bowl appearance after posting a 13–3 regular season record. It was the first time that the two franchises had played each other since 1984.

The Cowboys scored 35 points off of a Super Bowl-record nine Buffalo turnovers, including three first half touchdowns. Bills backup quarterback Frank Reich, who replaced injured starter Jim Kelly in the second quarter, threw a 40-yard touchdown on the final play of the third quarter to cut the lead to 31–17. Dallas then scored three more touchdowns in the fourth quarter. Cowboys quarterback Troy Aikman was named Super Bowl MVP, completing 22 of 30 passes for 273 yards and four touchdowns for a passer rating of 140.6, while also rushing for 28 yards.

In response to Fox's Super Bowl counterprogramming of a special episode of In Living Color during the previous year, the NFL booked Michael Jackson to perform during the entire Super Bowl XXVII halftime show. Jackson's performance started the league's trend of signing top acts to appear during the Super Bowl to attract more viewers and interest.

== Background ==
=== Arizona's Martin Luther King Day controversy ===
Super Bowl XXVII was originally scheduled to be played at Sun Devil Stadium in Tempe, Arizona, the home of the Phoenix Cardinals and the Arizona State Sun Devils. In 1983, U.S. president Ronald Reagan signed a bill creating Martin Luther King Jr. Day, a federal holiday honoring African-American civil rights leader Martin Luther King Jr. Many states had adopted the holiday at the state level by the time it was first observed in 1986. Arizona governor Bruce Babbitt issued an executive order creating the state holiday after the state legislature had voted against it. Babbitt's successor, Evan Mecham, rescinded the order upon taking office in January 1987 on the grounds that Babbitt did not have the authority to issue such an order. Mecham had made his displeasure for the holiday widely known, saying that King did not deserve a holiday. In response, Dr. King's widow Coretta Scott King and musician Stevie Wonder spearheaded an entertainment and convention boycott of Arizona, condemning Mecham for rescinding the law and accused him of racism. Mecham was impeached and removed from office in 1988 on charges of obstruction of justice and financial misconduct. In September 1989, the state legislature approved the holiday, and it was signed into law by new governor Rose Mofford. However, a petition drive blocked enactment of the law until voters approved it at the ballot box.

On March 13, 1990, the NFL held its annual owners' meeting in Orlando, Florida. One of the items on the agenda was to determine a host city for Super Bowl XXVII. Three cities submitted bids: Los Angeles/Pasadena (Rose Bowl), San Diego (Jack Murphy Stadium), and Phoenix/Tempe (Sun Devil Stadium). While the Los Angeles proposal guaranteed the most profit, Phoenix represented a fresh market for the game, and the owners wanted to reward Cardinals owners Bill Bidwill for his years of service to the league. Arizona civil rights activist Art Mobley was sent to the meeting to lobby against Phoenix winning the vote, attempting to build awareness to the MLK Day controversy. The vote was conducted and Tempe was awarded the game, but committee chairman and Eagles owner Norman Braman warned that if the upcoming MLK Day ballot initiative failed, the NFL would not hesitate to pull the game from Arizona and move it elsewhere. The relocation effort was heavily pressured by NFL players, the majority of whom were African American. Many players expressed concern in playing a Super Bowl in a state which MLK Day wasn't recognized.

The issue began to heat up again as election day approached. Polls were mixed, but generally showed that the Arizona electorate approved of an MLK holiday. However, the issue was confusing to voters since there were two competing initiatives. Proposition 301 called for replacing Columbus Day with MLK Day while Proposition 302 would create a new paid holiday on King's birthday. Both initiatives required a yes/no vote, and some voters were unsure if they could vote "yes" on both. Both propositions were defeated; Proposition 302 lost by a narrow 49.2%–50.8% margin, while Proposition 301 fell convincingly (24.6%–75.4%). Some observers believed that The NFL Today on CBS Sports may have created a backlash on the vote. Two days before the election, Greg Gumbel reported that the NFL was threatening to move the game if the vote failed. Some voters resented that notion, feeling they were being intimidated by the league, and voted "no" in protest. After the failed vote, NFL commissioner Paul Tagliabue recommended that the game be moved, and announced that the issue would be on the agenda at the next owners' meeting.

When they met in Kohala, Hawaii, on March 19, 1991, the owners debated whether to pull the game from Arizona. The Phoenix/Tempe contingent was permitted to defend their position, and the two losing cities (Pasadena and San Diego) also made presentations to the selection committee. According to the league's bylaws, at least three-quarters of the owners (representing 21 of the 28 teams) were required to approve such a decision. After deliberating for over three hours, the owners voted to pull the game from Tempe, although the exact number of votes for and against the measure was not disclosed. The Rose Bowl was chosen as the replacement site, the first time it had hosted the game since Super Bowl XXI. The NFL offered a compromise by reserving Super Bowl XXX for Tempe on a "preliminary" and "conditional" basis. Arizona voters approved the MLK Day holiday in November 1992. The NFL responded by formally assigning Super Bowl XXX to Tempe at their March 1993 meeting.

=== Buffalo Bills ===
The Bills entered Super Bowl XXVII trying to avoid becoming the first team to lose three consecutive Super Bowls. Once again, the team was loaded with Pro Bowl players, boasting 12 Pro Bowl selections. During the regular season, Buffalo's no-huddle offense ranked as the number two offense in the league (6,114 yards) and ranked as the number one rushing offense (2,436 yards). Running back Thurman Thomas rushed for a career-high 1,487 yards and 9 touchdowns during the regular season, while also catching 58 passes for 626 yards and another 3 touchdowns. Running back Kenneth Davis rushed for 613 yards, caught 15 passes for 80 yards, and added another 251 yards returning kickoffs. Quarterback Jim Kelly had 269 out of 462 completions for 3,457 yards, 23 touchdowns, and 19 interceptions. Wide receiver Andre Reed led the team with 65 receptions for 913 yards and 3 touchdowns, receiver James Lofton contributed 51 receptions for 786 yards and 6 touchdowns, and wide receiver Don Beebe caught 33 passes for 554 and 2 touchdowns. Also, tight end Pete Metzelaars recorded 30 receptions for 298 yards and 6 touchdowns. The Bills also had one of the best offensive lines in the NFL, led by Pro Bowlers Will Wolford, Jim Ritcher, and Howard Ballard, along with center Kent Hull.

On defense, the line was anchored by end Bruce Smith (14 sacks) and nose tackle Jeff Wright (6 sacks, 1 fumble recovery), who were both fully recovered after missing almost all of the previous season due to injuries. The Bills were once again led by their trio of linebackers Darryl Talley (77 tackles, 4 sacks), Shane Conlan (66 tackles, 2 sacks, 1 interception), and Pro Bowler Cornelius Bennett (52 tackles, 4 sacks, 3 fumble recoveries). The secondary was aided by the emergence of second-year safety Henry Jones, who tied for the NFL lead with 8 interceptions, returning them for 263 yards and 2 touchdowns. Safety Mark Kelso recorded 7 interceptions, while Pro Bowl cornerback Nate Odomes had 5. Defensive back Cliff Hicks led the Bills special teams unit, returning 29 punts for 289 yards (9th in the NFL).

However, the Bills' quest for a third consecutive Super Bowl suffered a major setback when they lost the final game of the season to the Houston Oilers. The loss caused the Bills to finish with an 11–5 record, losing out on the AFC East title to the Miami Dolphins based on tie-breaking rules, making them a wild card team for the playoffs. Thus, even if they won their first playoff game, they would have to win two on the road to make the Super Bowl. To make matters worse, Kelly also suffered strained knee ligaments during the loss to the Oilers and had to miss the first two playoff games. Furthermore, their first opponent in the playoffs ended up being the Oilers. A headline on a Buffalo newspaper stated the Bills' situation: "Bills Begin The Longest Road Today."

=== Resurrection of the Dallas Cowboys ===
Super Bowl XXVII saw the resurrection of the Dallas Cowboys. From 1966 to 1985, "America's Team" made the playoffs 18 out of 20 seasons under coach Tom Landry, including five Super Bowl appearances and two Super Bowl wins. But in the late 1980s, the team suffered several losing seasons, including a 3–13 regular season record in 1988. Then Jerry Jones bought the team on February 25, 1989, and in a controversial move, promptly fired Landry, the only coach Dallas had in 29 years as an NFL franchise. Jones replaced Landry with University of Miami head coach Jimmy Johnson, his former University of Arkansas teammate.

With Johnson as head coach and Jones as his own general manager, people in the league thought they could take advantage of them. Both lacked NFL experience, and instead of hiring coaching assistants with experience in the league, they hired ones that worked with Johnson in Miami. Compounding this issue was the departure of the two men that brought previous success to Dallas: founding president Tex Schramm and famed personnel man Gil Brandt.

The Cowboys' 3–13 record in 1988 did have a silver lining; it was the worst in the league and thus gave the Cowboys the first pick in the 1989 NFL draft. Jones and Johnson picked UCLA quarterback Troy Aikman, who would eventually go on to be selected to the Pro Bowl six times in his NFL career. Meanwhile, Jones and Johnson immediately started to shuffle the team's depth chart to find players talented enough to build a winning team. Linebacker Ken Norton Jr., one of the few holdovers from Landry's last losing seasons, would later claim that he would often go into a player huddle and meet new teammates for the first time.

Then, Jones and Johnson made a move midway through the 1989 season that shocked many in the league: they traded their only Pro Bowl player, running back Herschel Walker, to the Minnesota Vikings for five veteran players and eight draft choices. Although the Cowboys finished the 1989 season with a 1–15 record, their worst record since the team's inception, the foundations for the Cowboys' return to glory had been set. Although Dallas had the league's worst record, they traded away the first pick in the 1990 draft so they could get backup quarterback Steve Walsh in the supplemental draft. Then with the 17th pick, they drafted running back Emmitt Smith, and the trifecta of Aikman, Smith, and wide receiver Michael Irvin (who was drafted by Landry in 1988) was now set. Dallas also signed veteran tight end Jay Novacek away from Phoenix, who went on to make the Pro Bowl in five of his six years with the Cowboys.

Johnson also started to rebuild the team by drafting players who were fast, quick, and athletic. The defense was designed to become aggressive, while the offense was made to be a conservative one that did not make mistakes. In 1990, the Cowboys finished 7–9, but Smith won the NFL Rookie of the Year Award and Johnson was selected as NFL Coach of the Year. In 1991, the Cowboys finished with an 11–5 record and made the playoffs for the first time in six years.

In 1992, the Cowboys finished with a 13–3 regular season record, the second-best in the league and the best in team history. Although not a single one of their defensive players made the Pro Bowl, Dallas was ranked as the number one defense in the league (allowing only 4,278 yards), fourth in fewest points allowed (243), and ranked as the number one defense against the run (allowing only 1,244 yards), bringing back many fans' memories of the Doomsday Defenses of old. The defensive line was anchored by Jim Jeffcoat (10.5 sacks) and Tony Tolbert (8.5 sacks), along with future Hall of Fame pass rusher Charles Haley (six sacks), who had led the NFC in sacks in 1990 and had been acquired by Dallas in a trade with San Francisco. While Norton and Defensive Rookie of the Year Robert Jones anchored the linebacking corps, the team's solid secondary was led by defensive backs Kenneth Gant and James Washington, who both recorded 3 interceptions each, and rookie cornerback Kevin Smith. The last member of the secondary was defensive back Issiac Holt who had been acquired as part of the trade with the Vikings for Walker.

Dallas' offense finished second in the league in scoring with 409 points. Aikman had the best season of his career, completing 302 out of 473 passes (ranking second and fourth in the league) for 3,445 yards (fourth in the league) and 23 touchdowns (third in the league) while throwing only 14 interceptions, producing a quarterback rating of 89.6 (third best in the league). Smith led the NFL in rushing for the second year in a row with 1,713 yards and scoring 18 rushing touchdowns, while also catching 59 passes for 335 yards and a touchdown. Fullback Daryl Johnston was also an asset in the backfield, providing Smith with effective blocking and hauling in 32 receptions. Irvin, the team's emotional lightning rod, caught 78 passes for 1,396 yards and 7 touchdowns. Other contributors on the offense included wide receiver Alvin Harper (35 receptions for 562 yards and 4 touchdowns) and Novacek (68 receptions for 630 yards and 6 touchdowns). Dallas' dominant offensive line, later dubbed "The Great Wall of Dallas", was led by Pro Bowlers Nate Newton and Mark Stepnoski, along with 10-year veteran Mark Tuinei, free agent acquisition John Gesek and the youngster Erik Williams.

=== Playoffs ===
The Cowboys easily defeated their first playoff opponent, the Philadelphia Eagles, 34–10. Dallas' defense held the Eagles to only 178 offensive yards and sacked quarterback Randall Cunningham five times. Meanwhile, the Cowboys recorded 160 rushing yards and 185 passing yards. Aikman completed 15 of 25 passes and 2 touchdowns, while Smith ran for 114 yards and a touchdown.

Dallas then defeated the San Francisco 49ers 30–20 in the NFC Championship Game at Candlestick Park. This was the first time that the two teams met in the NFC Championship since the 49ers narrowly beat the Cowboys in the 1981 NFC Championship Game on Joe Montana's late touchdown pass to Dwight Clark known as "The Catch". The 49ers came into the game with the league's best regular season record at 14–2 and led the league in scoring with 431 points. But in this game, the Cowboys built a 24–13 lead going into the fourth quarter, as Aikman capped a nine-minute drive with a 16-yard touchdown pass to Smith. However, Steve Young's 5-yard touchdown pass to Jerry Rice cut the lead to 24–20 with 4:22 left in the game. But instead of trying to run out the clock with a running play, the Cowboys called a pass play: 896 F Flat, with a post on one side and a curl on the other. Irvin switched places in the formation with Harper to catch the curl since Aikman had thrown there twice before, but Aikman threw to Harper on the post when the 49ers showed blitz and Harper caught it and turned it into a 70-yard gain to the 49ers 10-yard line. Three plays later, Aikman threw a 6-yard touchdown pass to wide receiver Kelvin Martin to clinch the victory (the extra point was blocked). Aikman finished with 332 passing yards and 2 touchdowns, with no interceptions.

The Bills first defeated the Houston Oilers 41–38 in overtime, overcoming a 32-point deficit in what became known as "The Comeback". Playing without Kelly or Bennett in the lineup, nothing seemed to go right for the Bills in the first half. The Bills' offense could only score a single field goal, while their defense played even worse, as Oilers quarterback Warren Moon passed for 222 yards and 4 touchdowns, and Houston jumped to a 28–3 halftime lead. The disaster only seemed to get worse in the second half, as Thomas was knocked out of the game with a hip injury, while backup quarterback Frank Reich's first pass of the second half was intercepted by Bubba McDowell and returned 58 yards for a touchdown, making the score 35–3. However, the Bills suddenly stormed back to score five unanswered touchdowns to overcome the seemingly insurmountable deficit. First, Kenneth Davis scored on a 1-yard touchdown run. Then Buffalo recovered an onside kick and immediately scored again on Reich's 36-yard touchdown pass to Don Beebe. Reich then threw touchdowns of 26 and 18 yards to Andre Reed. In the fourth quarter, Reich hit Reed with a 17-yard score to give the Bills a 38–35 lead. The Oilers kicked a field goal late in the game to send it into overtime, but Nate Odomes' interception in the extra period set up kicker Steve Christie's game-winning field goal to give the Bills the biggest comeback win in NFL history at the time. The record was surpassed by the Minnesota Vikings' erasure of a 33-point deficit in their 39–36 routing of the Indianapolis Colts during week 15 of the 2022 NFL regular season, but the Buffalo victory remains the largest comeback win in NFL playoff history.

Buffalo then recorded a 24–3 win on the road against the Pittsburgh Steelers, the AFC Central champions with the AFC's best regular season record at 11–5. Although Jim Kelly and Thurman Thomas had not recovered enough to play in this game, Reich threw for 160 yards, 2 touchdowns, and no interceptions, while Davis rushed for 104 yards and a touchdown. Meanwhile, the defense redeemed themselves after giving up 38 points against the Oilers by holding the Steelers to only a field goal.

The Bills then defeated the Miami Dolphins 29–10 in the AFC Championship Game. The Dolphins were coming off a 31–0 blowout playoff win over the San Diego Chargers. But Buffalo's defense dominated the Dolphins' offense, intercepting quarterback Dan Marino twice, recovering three fumbles, and limiting Miami to just 33 rushing yards. Although Buffalo's offense had trouble scoring touchdowns because Kelly and Thomas were rusty coming back from their injuries, Christie scored five field goals to make up for the difference. Kelly did connect with Thomas on a screen pass for a 17-yard touchdown, and Davis ran it in from two yards out for another score. As a result, the Bills became the fourth wild-card team to advance to the Super Bowl.

This marked the first time since the AFL–NFL merger that the two Super Bowl teams each won their conference championship on the road, with Dallas winning in San Francisco and Buffalo in Miami. The only time it happened prior to 1992 was in 1966 (Super Bowl I), when Kansas City won at Buffalo and Green Bay won at Dallas. This would happen again in 1997, with Green Bay winning in San Francisco and Denver in Pittsburgh; in 2012, with San Francisco winning in Atlanta and Baltimore in New England; and in 2018, with the Los Angeles Rams winning in New Orleans and New England in Kansas City.

=== Super Bowl pre-game news and notes ===
Even though the Bills had more experienced players than the Cowboys, Dallas was favored to win Super Bowl XXVII based on the recent dominance of NFC teams in the Super Bowl. Some writers and fans were starting to compare Buffalo to the Super Bowl losers Minnesota Vikings and the Denver Broncos.

Still, many thought that the inexperienced Cowboys might panic under the pressure of playing in their first Super Bowl, and thus make a number of mistakes. Also, some thought Buffalo's no-huddle offense could eventually wear down and dominate Dallas' young defense.

Finally, Jimmy Johnson was looking to become the first head coach to win a college football national championship (Miami in 1987) and a Super Bowl.

This became last of five Super Bowl games played at the Rose Bowl in Pasadena. Two other Super Bowl games were played nearby at the Los Angeles Memorial Coliseum. This was the last time that a Super Bowl was hosted in a different stadium than the city's NFL teams, as the Rose Bowl has long been considered more suitable than the Coliseum for the high-profile game. Los Angeles would not host another Super Bowl for almost three decades, since it had no NFL teams from 1995 to 2015, and having an NFL team in a market or region has long been a de jure requirement for bidding on the game. Los Angeles hosted Super Bowl LVI in 2022 at SoFi Stadium, and any other Los Angeles Super Bowl moving forward will be played there and not the Rose Bowl; since the 1990s the league has given preference in awarding the Super Bowl to brand new or recently renovated NFL stadiums, alongside a trend of teams demanding public money or relocating to play in new stadiums.

As the designated home team in the annual rotation between AFC and NFC teams, the Cowboys elected to wear their home white uniforms with silver pants, forcing the Bills to wear their home blue uniforms with white pants.

This was the first meeting between Buffalo and Dallas since 1984, when the 0–11 Bills won 14–3 at home, with Greg Bell running for an 85-yard touchdown on the game's first play. The loss cost the Cowboys a playoff berth, as they lost a tiebreaker with the NFC East rival Giants.

== Broadcasting ==
The game was broadcast on television in the United States by NBC. Dick Enberg served as the play-by-play announcer with color commentator Bob Trumpy in the broadcast booth. CBS was originally scheduled to broadcast Super Bowl XXVII, but the NFL allowed NBC and CBS to swap Super Bowls XXVI and XXVII so CBS could use Super Bowl XXVI as a strong lead-in for its coverage of the 1992 Winter Olympics.

Bob Costas hosted all the events with analyst Mike Ditka, who joined NBC almost immediately after he was fired as head coach of the Chicago Bears earlier in January. Other contributors included former Boston Globe sportswriter Will McDonough (assigned to Buffalo's locker room); former Oakland/Los Angeles Raiders tight end Todd Christensen; The Tonight Show host Jay Leno; Cris Collinsworth (participating in an NFL Experience piece with Christensen as well as reporting from the Dallas locker room); former Los Angeles Lakers basketball player Magic Johnson (then working as a commentator for the NBA on NBC; Johnson was assigned to an interview with Dallas Cowboys quarterback Troy Aikman, running back Emmitt Smith and wide receiver Michael Irvin); Paul Maguire; Gayle Gardner; Jim Lampley (who would replace Costas as host of NFL Live for the following season); and Dateline NBC correspondent Deborah Roberts (producing a special report on the Michael Jackson halftime show). Also included was an interview with former New York Jets defensive end Dennis Byrd and his wife Angela in the first one-on-one interview since Byrd suffered a paralyzing neck injury (which he eventually recovered from) suffered in a collision with teammate Scott Mersereau during their game against Kansas City.

NBC's Super Bowl lead-out program was the series debut of Homicide: Life on the Street. This would be the third successful series to premiere after a Super Bowl (The A-Team, which premiered after Super Bowl XVII, and The Wonder Years, which premiered after Super Bowl XXII, were the other two successful series).

Super Bowl XXVII was broadcast to 125 countries around the world. In addition to the United States, this Super Bowl was also broadcast in Canada on CTV, in Germany on Tele 5, in Mexico on Canal 5, in Australia on the ABC, in the Philippines on GMA Network and World TV 21 and the United Kingdom on Channel 4.

The NFL's Greatest Games episode A Man and His Moment features Jimmy Johnson reading excerpts from his book Turning the Thing Around: My Life in Football, interspersed with game footage and audio from Super Bowl XXVII. It was based on the Super Bowl XXVII highlight film, which had the same title as this episode.

== Entertainment ==
=== Pregame ceremonies ===
The pre show featured The Rockettes dance company in a tribute to Hollywood music and cinema in the United States. Also featured were former Eagles singer Glenn Frey and Fleetwood Mac.

==== National anthem ====
Country music singer Garth Brooks sang the national anthem. He was accompanied by actress Marlee Matlin, who signed the anthem for the deaf fans. Brooks very nearly did not perform the anthem—he left the stadium less than an hour before he was slated to sing, because of a dispute with NBC, regarding a video he asked them to air for the song "We Shall Be Free". Television producers spotted rocker Jon Bon Jovi in the crowd and were prepared to have him perform the anthem, until Brooks was finally coaxed back into the stadium.

==== Coin toss ====
The coin toss ceremony featured a future infamous celebrity, former Bills running back O. J. Simpson, who was working for NBC Sports at the time.

=== Halftime show ===
After Super Bowl XXVI, where a special episode of In Living Color, broadcast by future NFL broadcaster Fox during the game's halftime period, successfully attracted viewers away from the Super Bowl telecast on CBS (with viewership falling by 22% over halftime), the NFL began the process of heightening the profile of the halftime show in an effort to attract mainstream viewers. Radio City Productions, who would produce the halftime show, attempted to court Michael Jackson to serve as the headline act by meeting with him and his manager Sandy Gallin. After three failed negotiations, one having asked the NFL for a fee of $1 million, Jackson's management agreed to allow him to perform at Super Bowl XXVII.

Although the league does not pay appearance fees for Super Bowl halftime performers, the NFL and Frito-Lay agreed to donate $100,000 to the Heal the World Foundation—a charity that was founded by Jackson, as well as commercial time to air an appeal for the foundation's Heal L.A. campaign, which aimed to provide health care, drug education, and mentorship for Los Angeles youth, particularly children affected by the aftermath of the 1992 Los Angeles riots.

Jackson's set included a medley consisting of "Jam" (with the beginning of "Why You Wanna Trip On Me"), "Billie Jean" and "Black or White" (with the beginning of "Another Part of Me"). The finale featured an audience card stunt, a video montage showing Jackson participating in various humanitarian efforts around the world, and a choir of 3,500 local Los Angeles area children singing "We Are the World", later joining Jackson as he sang his single "Heal the World".

The halftime show was a major success, marking the first time in Super Bowl history that ratings increased between halves during the game with a whopping 133.4 million people tuning in, making it the most watched television broadcast of all time until surpassed in 2025 by the end of the second quarter and subsequent halftime show of Super Bowl LIX.

Nine days later, Jackson would give the most watched television interview of all time with Oprah Winfrey.

Super Bowl XXVII halftime show
1. "Jam" (Note: contains instrumental intro from "Why You Wanna Trip on Me") (0:52)
2. "Billie Jean" (1:03)
3. "Black or White" (Note: contains instrumental intro from "Another Part of Me") (2:42)
4. "We Are the World" (1:01)
5. "Heal the World" (3:46)

== Game summary ==
=== First quarter ===
The game got off to a promising start for Buffalo. After both teams were forced to punt on their opening possessions, Bills wide receiver Steve Tasker blocked Cowboys punter Mike Saxon's ensuing punt, knocking the ball out of bounds at the Dallas 16-yard line. Four plays later, running back Thurman Thomas scored on a 2-yard touchdown run to give the Bills the 7–0 early lead.

Dallas then reached their own 40-yard line on their next drive, but an illegal formation penalty on offensive tackle Mark Tuinei nullified running back Emmitt Smith's 12-yard run. Quarterback Troy Aikman then threw two consecutive incompletions, and the Cowboys were forced to punt again. The Bills subsequently advanced to midfield with the aid of a roughing the passer penalty on Cowboys defensive tackle Leon Lett and a 21-yard pass from quarterback Jim Kelly to wide receiver Andre Reed.

Then the wave of turnovers began. On the next play, a blitz by safety Kenneth Gant led to Kelly throwing an interception to safety James Washington, who returned the ball 13 yards to the Bills 47-yard line. Six plays later, aided by a 20-yard reception by wide receiver Michael Irvin on 3rd-and-16, the Cowboys tied the game on Aikman's 23-yard touchdown pass to tight end Jay Novacek.

Buffalo had to start at their own 10 following the ensuing kickoff due to an illegal block by Bills linebacker Mark Maddox. On the first play of the drive, defensive end Charles Haley strip-sacked Kelly, and defensive tackle Jimmie Jones picked the ball out of the air at the 2-yard line and dove into the end zone for a touchdown to give Dallas a 14–7 lead. The Cowboys had scored two touchdowns in a span of 15 seconds, the shortest time between touchdowns in Super Bowl history.

The Cowboys nearly forced yet another turnover when Bills wide receiver Brad Lamb returned the ensuing kickoff 33 yards to the Buffalo 37-yard line before Gant stripped the ball from him, but linebacker Keith Goganious recovered the ball for Buffalo on the 42. Running back Kenneth Davis then ran twice for a gain of 14 yards to end the first quarter.

=== Second quarter ===
On the first play of the second quarter, Kelly's 40-yard completion to Reed set up 1st-and-goal for the Bills at the Cowboys' 4-yard line. However, the Dallas defense immediately tightened up as Buffalo failed to score on three rushing attempts, with linebacker Ken Norton Jr. meeting Davis in a hole inside the 1-yard line on third down and driving him backwards. On fourth down, Kelly threw a pass that safety Thomas Everett intercepted in the end zone for a touchback.

Despite being forced to punt following Everett's interception, Dallas began to take over the game from there. On Buffalo's next drive, Norton delivered a hard hit on Kelly that re-injured the latter's knee, which he sprained earlier in the season, and playoff star Frank Reich took Kelly's place. Reich started out well, completing his first two passes, including a 38-yard completion to Reed to advance the ball to the Dallas 22-yard line, while Davis was also a major contributor on the drive, rushing five times for 28 yards. However, Thomas was stopped for no gain on 3rd-and-1 at the 4-yard line. Rather than attempt another fourth-down play near the goal line, the Bills settled for kicker Steve Christie's 21-yard field goal to cut their deficit to 14–10 with 3:24 left in the half.

The Cowboys exploded in the closing minutes of the first half. First, they responded to the Bills' field goal on their next possession with a 5-play, 72-yard drive, which consisted of a pair of passes from Aikman to Smith and Novacek for 17 yards, followed by a 38-yard run by Smith to give Dallas a first down inside the Buffalo 20-yard line as the half came to the two-minute warning. Aikman then finished the drive with a 19-yard touchdown pass to Irvin, increasing the lead to 21–10. On the first play of the Bills' ensuing drive, Thomas caught a swing pass from Reich, but fumbled the ball while being tackled by Lett, and Jones recovered it at the Buffalo 18-yard line. Aikman then threw another touchdown pass to Irvin to give Dallas a 28–10 lead (Irvin's two touchdown receptions made him the seventh player to do so in a Super Bowl. Irvin also became the second player, after Washington Redskins wide receiver Ricky Sanders in Super Bowl XXII, to catch two touchdowns in a single quarter. Furthermore, Irvin's two catches occurred in a span of 18 seconds, the fastest pair of touchdowns scored by the same player in Super Bowl history).

With just over a minute left in the first half, the Bills barely avoided another turnover when Davis recovered a fumbled handoff from Reich. But two plays later, cornerback Larry Brown intercepted Reich's pass at the Dallas 28-yard line to preserve the Cowboys' 18-point lead at halftime.

=== Third quarter ===
Dallas then took the opening drive of the second half and advanced 77 yards in 11 plays, which included two receptions by Irvin for 37 yards and four runs by Smith for 28 yards. However, on 3rd-and-goal at the Buffalo 2-yard line, Aikman's pass to Novacek in the end zone was overthrown, forcing Dallas to settle for kicker Lin Elliott's 20-yard field goal, increasing their lead to 31–10. After the Bills' next possession resulted in a punt and the Cowboys' resulted in a turnover on downs, Buffalo responded to Dallas' field goal with a 5-play, 61-yard drive, which ended with Reich's 40-yard touchdown pass to wide receiver Don Beebe on the last play of the quarter. Despite their five turnovers in the first half, Buffalo only trailed Dallas 31–17 going into the final quarter, and after their comeback from the 32-point deficit to the Houston Oilers in the Wild Card game, a two-touchdown comeback seemed perfectly within their capabilities.

=== Fourth quarter ===
However, the Cowboys tightened up on both offense and defense, and held the Bills scoreless for the rest of the game. On Dallas' next possession, Smith fumbled the ball, which was recovered by Aikman, but resulted in a 12-yard loss. Two plays later, Aikman completed an 18-yard pass to Smith, but it brought up 4th-and-1 and the Cowboys punted. During the punt, Bills cornerback Cliff Hicks fumbled the catch and had to fall on the ball at the Buffalo 12. From there, the Bills did not gain a yard and punted back to the Cowboys. After an 11-yard run by Smith, Aikman threw a 45-yard touchdown pass to wide Alvin Harper, giving Dallas a 38–17 lead, and essentially putting the game away. However, the Cowboys were not done adding to their lead. On the second play of the Bills' next possession, Everett intercepted a pass from Reich and returned it 22 yards to the Buffalo 8-yard line, setting up another touchdown three plays later on Smith's 10-yard run. Two plays after Buffalo received the ensuing kickoff, Reich fumbled a high snap while in a shotgun formation. Norton recovered the loose ball and returned it 9 yards for a touchdown, capping off the scoring at 52–17. The 21 points by the Cowboys is the most for a team in the 4th quarter, matched by the Kansas City Chiefs in Super Bowl LIV. The Cowboys also became just the second team to score two defensive touchdowns in a Super Bowl. The Raiders also did so in Super Bowl XVIII with a blocked punt return and an interception return.

One of the more memorable moments of the game came after the Cowboys had built a 35-point lead. Cowboys defensive end Jim Jeffcoat strip-sacked Reich, and Lett picked up the ball with no one in front of him, appearing ready to score on a 64-yard fumble return, but Beebe ran a showboating Lett down from behind and stripped him of the ball just before he crossed the goal line, as the ball rolled out of the end zone for a touchback. Lett would redeem himself when he sacked Reich to end the game and give the Cowboys their first championship title since 1978. After the game, in an otherwise dejected Buffalo locker room, Bills owner Ralph Wilson went straight to Beebe and thanked him for his hustle and perseverance.

Smith was the top rusher of the game, rushing for 108 yards and a touchdown, while also catching 6 passes for 27 yards. Irvin was the Cowboys' leading receiver with 6 receptions for 114 yards and 2 touchdowns. Novacek added 7 receptions for 72 yards and a touchdown. Lett recorded a sack, a fumble recovery, and 2 forced fumbles.

Reich and Kelly combined for 22 out of 38 completions for 276 yards and a touchdown, but also threw 4 interceptions. Thomas, who gained 2,113 combined rushing and receiving yards during the season, was held to just 29 combined rushing and receiving yards in the game. Reed was the Bills' top receiver with 8 receptions for 152 yards. Bills running back Kenneth Davis was their leading rusher with 86 yards. Davis also caught 3 passes for 16 yards and returned a kickoff for 21 yards, giving him 123 total yards.

Buffalo had seven possessions which ended in four plays or less because of turnovers and resulted in five Dallas touchdowns. Irvin and Bills receiver Andre Reed each had over 100 yards receiving, making it the first time players from different teams had at least 100 yards receiving in a Super Bowl; Irvin had 114 yards, while Reed had 152. Reed's total is the highest for a player on a losing team.

=== Postgame notes ===
By virtue of his national championship with Miami in 1987, Jimmy Johnson also became the first coach to win both an NCAA Division I-A/FBS national championship and a Super Bowl. Only two coaches have since accomplished the feat: Johnson's Cowboys successor Barry Switzer of Oklahoma and Pete Carroll of USC and Seattle.

Aikman, Irvin and Norton also provided commentary for the 1992 Cowboys' installment of America's Game: The Super Bowl Champions, narrated by Alec Baldwin. The 1992 Cowboys were also ranked 5th out of the first 40 Super Bowl winning teams as selected by a 53-person panel of "Blue Ribbon" experts on the NFL and were the highest-placing Cowboys team.

=== Box score ===
Super Bowl XXVII: Dallas Cowboys 52, Buffalo Bills 17

Quarter	1	2	3	4	Total
Bills (AFC)	7	3	7	0	17
Cowboys (NFC)	14	14	3	21	52

at Rose Bowl, Pasadena, California

- Date: January 31, 1993
- Game time: 3:25 p.m. PST
- Game weather: 61 °F (16 °C), sunny

Scoring summary

Quarter	Time	Drive			Team	Scoring information	Score	
Quarter	Time	Plays	Yards	TOP	Team	Scoring information	BUF	DAL
1	10:00	4	16	1:40	BUF	Thurman Thomas 2-yard touchdown run, Steve Christie kick good	7	0
1	1:36	6	47	3:04	DAL	Jay Novacek 23-yard touchdown reception from Troy Aikman, Lin Elliott kick good	7	7
1	1:21	—	—	—	DAL	Fumble recovery returned 2 yards for touchdown by Jimmie Jones, Elliott kick good	7	14
2	3:24	12	82	4:46	BUF	21-yard field goal by Christie	10	14
2	1:54	5	72	1:30	DAL	Michael Irvin 19-yard touchdown reception from Aikman, Elliott kick good	10	21
2	1:36	1	18	0:07	DAL	Irvin 18-yard touchdown reception from Aikman, Elliott kick good	10	28
3	8:21	12	77	6:39	DAL	20-yard field goal by Elliott	10	31
3	0:00	5	61	2:10	BUF	Don Beebe 40-yard touchdown reception from Frank Reich, Christie kick good	17	31
4	10:04	2	56	0:50	DAL	Alvin Harper 45-yard touchdown reception from Aikman, Elliott kick good	17	38
4	8:12	3	8	1:29	DAL	Emmitt Smith 10-yard touchdown run, Elliott kick good	17	45
4	7:31	—	—	—	DAL	Fumble recovery returned 9 yards for touchdown by Ken Norton Jr., Elliott kick good	17	52
"TOP" = time of possession. For other American football terms, see Glossary of American football.							17	52

== Final statistics ==
Sources: NFL.com Super Bowl XXVII, Super Bowl XXVII Play Finder Dal, Super Bowl XXVII Play Finder Buf

=== Statistical comparison ===
	Buffalo Bills	Dallas Cowboys
First downs	22	20
First downs rushing	7	9
First downs passing	11	11
First downs penalty	4	0
Third down efficiency	5/11	5/11
Fourth down efficiency	0/2	0/1
Net yards rushing	108	137
Rushing attempts	29	29
Yards per rush	3.7	4.7
Passing – Completions/attempts	22/38	22/30
Times sacked-total yards	4–22	1–2
Interceptions thrown	4	0
Net yards passing	254	271
Total net yards	362	408
Punt returns-total yards	1–0	3–35
Kickoff returns-total yards	4–90	4–79
Interceptions-total return yards	0–0	4–35
Punts-average yardage	3–45.3	4–32.8
Fumbles-lost	8–5	4–2
Penalties-total yards	4–30	8–53
Time of possession	28:48	31:12
Turnovers	9	1

=== Individual statistics ===
Bills passing
	C/ATT^{1}	Yds	TD	INT	Rating
Frank Reich	18/31	194	1	2	60.4
Jim Kelly	4/7	82	0	2	58.9
Bills rushing
	Car^{2}	Yds	TD	LG^{3}	Yds/Car
Kenneth Davis	15	86	0	14	5.73
Thurman Thomas	11	19	1	9	1.73
Carwell Gardner	1	3	0	3	3.00
Frank Reich	2	0	0	0	0.00
Bills receiving
	Rec^{4}	Yds	TD	LG^{3}	Target^{5}
Andre Reed	8	152	0	40	10
Thurman Thomas	4	10	0	7	4
Kenneth Davis	3	16	0	13	4
Don Beebe	2	50	1	40	5
Steve Tasker	2	30	0	16	3
Pete Metzelaars	2	12	0	7	3
Keith McKeller	1	6	0	6	2
James Lofton	0	0	0	0	6
Carwell Gardner	0	0	0	0	1

Cowboys passing
	C/ATT^{1}	Yds	TD	INT	Rating
Troy Aikman	22/30	273	4	0	140.7
Cowboys rushing
	Car^{2}	Yds	TD	LG^{3}	Yds/Car
Emmitt Smith	22	108	1	38	4.91
Troy Aikman	3	28	0	19	9.33
Derrick Gainer	2	1	0	1	0.50
Steve Beuerlein	1	0	0	0	0.00
Daryl Johnston	1	0	0	0	0.00
Cowboys receiving
	Rec^{4}	Yds	TD	LG^{3}	Target^{5}
Jay Novacek	7	72	1	23	10
Michael Irvin	6	114	2	25	8
Emmitt Smith	6	27	0	18	6
Daryl Johnston	2	15	0	8	2
Alvin Harper	1	45	1	45	1
Kelvin Martin	0	0	0	0	1

^{1}Completions/attempts ^{2}Carries ^{3}Long gain ^{4}Receptions ^{5}Times targeted

=== Records set ===
The following records were set in Super Bowl XXVII, according to the official NFL.com boxscore and the Pro-Football-Reference.com game summary.

Player Records Set
Most receptions, career	21	Andre Reed
Most fumble return yards, game	64	Leon Lett (Dallas)
Longest fumble return	64 yards	Leon Lett (Dallas)
Records Tied
Most fumbles, game	3	Frank Reich
Most fumbles recovered, game	2	Jimmie Jones (Dallas)
Most fumbles recovered, career	2	Jimmie Jones (Dallas)
Most fumble returns for touchdowns, game	1	Jimmie Jones (Dallas)
Most fumble returns for touchdowns, game	1	Ken Norton Jr (Dallas)
Most (one point) extra points, game	7	Lin Elliott (Dallas)

Team Records Set
Most Super Bowl appearances	6	Cowboys
Most points, fourth quarter	21	Cowboys
Most fumble returns for touchdowns, game	2	Cowboys
Most consecutive Super Bowl losses	3	Bills
Most fumbles, game	8	Bills
Most fumbles lost, game	5	Bills
Most turnovers, game	9	Bills
Records Tied
Most consecutive Super Bowl appearances	3	Bills
Most first downs, penalty	4	Bills
Most points, first quarter	14	Cowboys
Most (one point) PATs	7	Cowboys
Most Interceptions by	4	Cowboys

Turnovers are defined as the number of times losing the ball on interceptions and fumbles.

Records Set, both team totals
	Total	Cowboys	Bills
Most points	69	52	17
Most points, first quarter	21	14	7
Most fumbles	12	4	8
Most fumbles lost	7	2	5
Records tied, both team totals
Most touchdowns	9	7	2
Most (one point) PATs	9	(7–7)	(2–2)
Most Turnovers	11	2	9

== Starting lineups ==
Hall of Fame‡

Buffalo	Position	Position	Dallas
Offense
James Lofton‡	WR		Alvin Harper
Will Wolford	LT		Mark Tuinei
Jim Ritcher	LG		Nate Newton
Kent Hull	C		Mark Stepnoski
Glenn Parker	RG		John Gesek
Howard Ballard	RT		Erik Williams
Pete Metzelaars	TE		Jay Novacek
Andre Reed‡	WR		Michael Irvin‡
Jim Kelly‡	QB		Troy Aikman‡
Thurman Thomas‡	RB		Emmitt Smith‡
Don Beebe	WR	FB	Daryl Johnston
Defense
Phil Hansen	DE	LE	Tony Tolbert
Jeff Wright	NT	LT	Russell Maryland
Bruce Smith‡	DE	RT	Tony Casillas
Marvcus Patton	LB	RE	Charles Haley‡
Shane Conlan	LB		Vinson Smith
Cornelius Bennett	LB		Robert Jones
Darryl Talley	LB		Ken Norton Jr.
James Williams	LCB	CB	Kevin Smith
Nate Odomes	RCB	CB	Larry Brown
Henry Jones	SS		Thomas Everett
Mark Kelso	FS		James Washington

== Officials ==
- Referee: Dick Hantak #105 second Super Bowl (XVII as back judge)
- Umpire: Ron Botchan #110 second Super Bowl (XX)
- Head linesman: Ron Phares #10 first Super Bowl
- Line judge: Dick McKenzie #41 second Super Bowl (XXV)
- Back judge: Jim Poole #92 second Super Bowl (XXI)
- Side judge: Dean Look #49 third Super Bowl (XIII, XV)
- Field judge: Donnie Hampton #44 first (and only) Super Bowl
- Alternate referee: Dale Hamer #104 (head linesman for XVII and XXII)
- Alternate umpire: John Keck #67 (alternate for XV, umpire for XXX)

For the first (and to date only) time in Super Bowl history, officials changed shirts at halftime, going from short sleeves in the first half to long sleeves for the second.

Donnie Hampton died January 30, 1995, at age 47, one day after Super Bowl XXIX.
