= 1993 Dallas Cowboys season =

NFL team season

- Owner: Jerry Jones
- General manager: Jerry Jones and Jimmy Johnson
- Head coach: Jimmy Johnson
- Offensive coordinator: Norv Turner
- Defensive coordinator: Butch Davis
- Home stadium: Texas Stadium

Results
- Record: 12–4
- Division place: 1st NFC East
- Playoffs: Won Divisional Playoffs (vs. Packers) 27–17; Won NFC Championship (vs. 49ers) 38–21; Won Super Bowl XXVIII (vs. Bills) 30–13
- Pro Bowlers: QB Troy Aikman; WR Michael Irvin; RB Emmitt Smith; FB Daryl Johnston; TE Jay Novacek; OT Erik Williams; OG Nate Newton; C Mark Stepnoski; DE Russell Maryland; LB Ken Norton Jr. FS Thomas Everett

Uniform
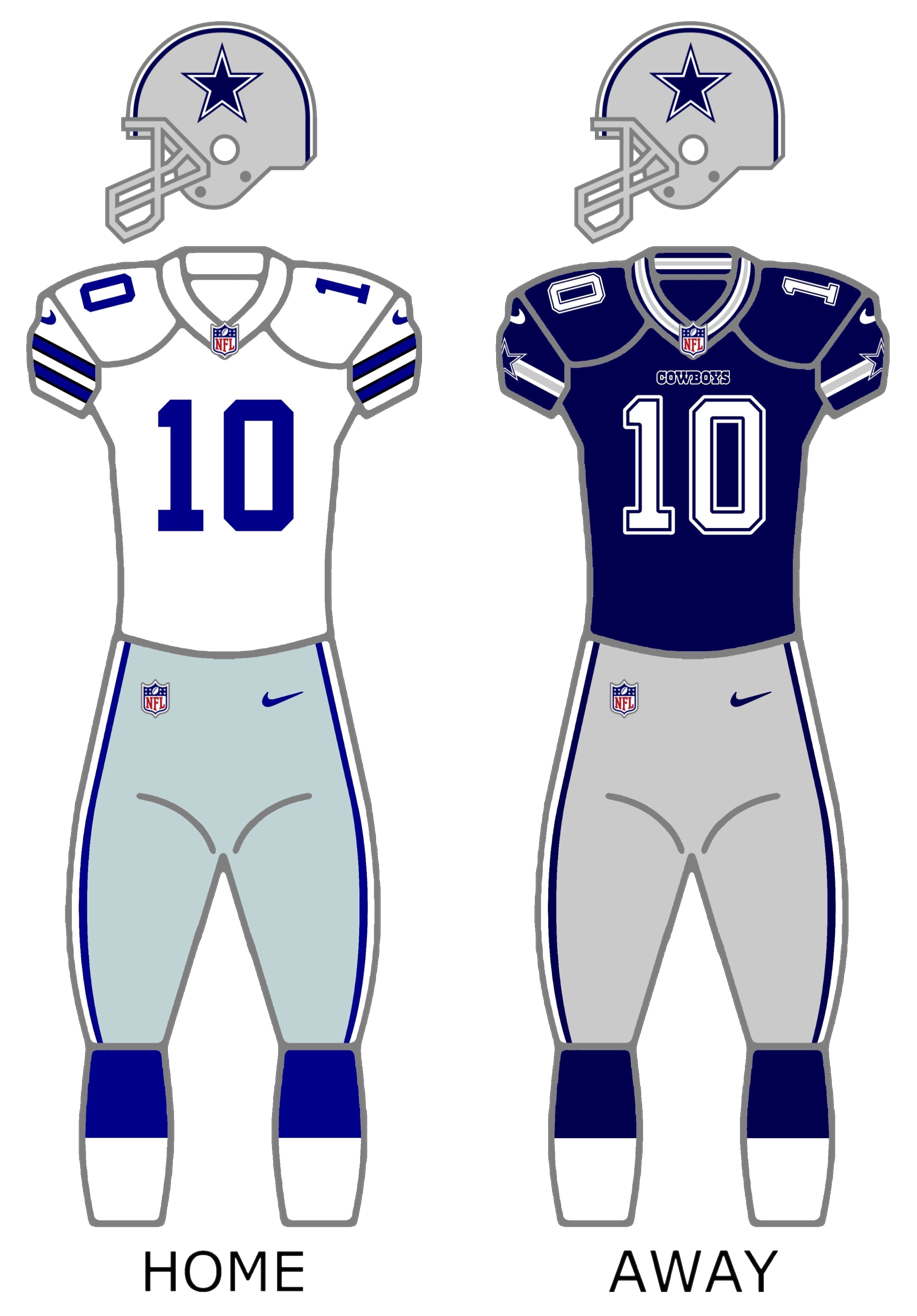

The 1993 Dallas Cowboys season was the franchise's 34th season in the National Football League (NFL) and was the fifth and final year of the franchise under head coach Jimmy Johnson. During Johnson's tenure, the Cowboys made two of their three Super Bowl appearances between 1992 and 1995 and won back-to-back Super Bowl titles. The season is notable for seeing the Cowboys become the first team to start 0–2 and still reach (and subsequently win) the Super Bowl. The following off-season was marked by the surprising resignation of Johnson, who departed the Cowboys due to a dispute with owner Jerry Jones about who deserved more credit for the back-to-back Super Bowl wins. This would be Johnson's last head coaching job until 1996, when he became the new head coach of the Miami Dolphins to replace the retiring Don Shula, who had served as their head coach since 1970. They are, as of 2025, the most recent NFC team to repeat as Super Bowl champions.

The 1993 Cowboys ranked #23 on the 100 greatest teams of all time presented by the NFL on its 100th anniversary.

== Offseason ==
Additions	Subtractions
LB Matt Vanderbeek (Colts)	QB Steve Beuerlein (Cardinals)
QB Hugh Millen (Patriots)	P Mike Saxon (Patriots)
	CB Issiac Holt (Dolphins)

=== NFL draft ===
1993 Dallas Cowboys draft
Round	Pick	Player	Position	College	Notes
2	46	Kevin Williams	Wide receiver	Miami (FL)	
2	54	Darrin Smith	Linebacker	Miami (FL)	
3	84	Mike Middleton	Safety	Indiana	
4	94	Derrick Lassic	Running back	Alabama	
4	96	Ron Stone *	Guard	Boston College	
6	168	Barry Minter	Linebacker	Tulsa	
7	196	Brock Marion *	Safety	Nevada	
8	203	Dave Thomas	Cornerback	Tennessee	
8	213	Reggie Givens	Cornerback	Penn State	
Made roster * Made at least one Pro Bowl during career

=== Undrafted free agents ===
1993 undrafted free agents of note
Player	Position	College
Brad Bretz	Quarterback	Cal St.-Hayward
Jason Burleson	Tight end	Texas
Anthony Jones	Wide receiver	Oregon
Tony Kennedy	Running back	Virginia Tech
Alan Luther	Guard	Texas
Michael Payton	Quarterback	Marshall
Greg Reed	Wide receiver	Southern Miss
Rob Wagner	Defensive tackle	Northern Illinois

== Season summary ==
The Cowboys' journey towards Super Bowl XXVIII proved more difficult than the previous season. Running back Emmitt Smith held out the first two regular season games over a contract dispute. Dallas lost lose both games to the Washington Redskins and Buffalo Bills starting the season at 0–2. The team acquired veteran quarterback Bernie Kosar (who had played for Johnson while at Miami) after his release from the Cleveland Browns as insurance for starting quarterback Troy Aikman, who suffered a severe concussion in the NFC Championship game versus San Francisco, and backup Steve Beuerlein signed with the Phoenix Cardinals.

In arguably his finest game as a professional, Emmitt Smith suffered a second degree separated shoulder in the regular season finale versus their NFC East division rival New York Giants, with the winner clinching home-field advantage throughout the playoffs. Smith willed himself through excruciating pain and carried the Cowboys to an overtime win. Dallas finished with an NFC-best 12–4 record and for the first time in 16 years, home-field advantage throughout the playoffs. Smith was later named the NFL MVP and with 1,486 rushing yards and nine touchdowns, also earned his third NFL rushing title. Smith would also later be voted Super Bowl MVP, giving him the honor of being the only player to win all three awards in the same season. Another outstanding Smith performance came against the Eagles, where he rushed for a career-high 237 yards.

The season was also notable for the Leon Lett "blunder" in the annual Thanksgiving Day game. With Texas Stadium unusually covered with snow and ice, Dallas led the Dolphins 14–13 with seconds remaining as the Dolphins' Pete Stoyanovich attempted a field goal. The Cowboys' Jimmie Jones blocked the field goal, apparently ending the game. However, with the blocked ball rolling around at the Dallas 10, Lett attempted to fall on it and slipped, kicking the ball and making it "live" again. Miami's Jeff Dellenbach recovered and Stoyanovich made the most of his shorter second chance, giving the Dolphins a most improbable 16–14 win.

Aikman finished the regular season completing 271 out of 392 passes for 3,100 yards, 15 touchdowns, and 6 interceptions. Wide receiver Michael Irvin once again led the team with 88 catches for 1,330 yards and seven touchdowns. Wide receiver Alvin Harper had 36 catches for 777 yards and five touchdowns, and tight end Jay Novacek had 44 receptions for 445 yards and a touchdown. The offensive line consisted of Pro Bowlers Mark Stepnoski, Erik Williams, and Nate Newton. The defense was anchored by Pro Bowlers such as Russell Maryland, Ken Norton Jr., and Thomas Everett.

== Preseason ==
Week	Date	Opponent	Result	Record	Venue	Recap
1	August 1	Minnesota Vikings	L 7–13	0–1	Texas Stadium	Recap
2	August 8	vs. Detroit Lions	T 13–13 (OT)	0–1–1	Wembley Stadium (London)	Recap
3	August 14	Los Angeles Raiders	W 13–7	1–1–1	Texas Stadium	Recap
4	August 21	at Houston Oilers	L 20–23	1–2–1	Houston Astrodome	Recap
5	August 27	at Chicago Bears	L 21–23	1–3–1	Soldier Field	Recap

== Regular season ==
Week	Date	Opponent	Result	Record	Venue	Recap
1	September 6	at Washington Redskins	L 16–35	0–1	Robert F. Kennedy Memorial Stadium	Recap
2	September 12	Buffalo Bills	L 10–13	0–2	Texas Stadium	Recap
3	September 19	at Phoenix Cardinals	W 17–10	1–2	Sun Devil Stadium	Recap
4	Bye					
5	October 3	Green Bay Packers	W 36–14	2–2	Texas Stadium	Recap
6	October 10	at Indianapolis Colts	W 27–3	3–2	Hoosier Dome	Recap
7	October 17	San Francisco 49ers	W 26–17	4–2	Texas Stadium	Recap
8	Bye					
9	October 31	at Philadelphia Eagles	W 23–10	5–2	Veterans Stadium	Recap
10	November 7	New York Giants	W 31–9	6–2	Texas Stadium	Recap
11	November 14	Phoenix Cardinals	W 20–15	7–2	Texas Stadium	Recap
12	November 21	at Atlanta Falcons	L 14–27	7–3	Georgia Dome	Recap
13	November 25	Miami Dolphins	L 14–16	7–4	Texas Stadium	Recap
14	December 6	Philadelphia Eagles	W 23–17	8–4	Texas Stadium	Recap
15	December 12	at Minnesota Vikings	W 37–20	9–4	Hubert H. Humphrey Metrodome	Recap
16	December 18	at New York Jets	W 28–7	10–4	Giants Stadium	Recap
17	December 26	Washington Redskins	W 38–3	11–4	Texas Stadium	Recap
18	January 2	at New York Giants	W 16–13 (OT)	12–4	Giants Stadium	Recap

=== Game summaries ===
==== Week 1 at Washington Redskins ====
Despite two touchdown catches by Alvin Harper the Cowboys, playing without Emmitt Smith, fell 35–16 at RFK Stadium. Derrick Lassic, replacing Smith for the time being, rushed for 75 yards but the Cowboys offensive line, whose loyalty was to Smith, didn’t block for him with the same effort; safety James Washington called it “totally unfair to Lassic.”

==== Week 2 vs. Buffalo Bills ====
Before a home crowd frustrated by the Cowboys’ slow start and the continuing contract holdout by Emmitt Smith, the Cowboys fell behind the Bills 10–0, clawed back to tie the game, then fell on Steve Christie’s 35-yard field goal. Lin Elliott missed two kicks (and was cut from the team), Troy Aikman was intercepted twice, and Derrick Lassic fumbled twice. An enraged Charles Haley threw his helmet through the wall in the locker room demanding ownership to end the Emmitt Smith contract issue.

==== Week 3 at Phoenix Cardinals ====
Three days before the game, the Cowboys finally negotiated a four-year deal with Emmitt Smith. In Smith’s first game back, Derrick Lassic scored twice, but his 60 total yards came on fourteen carries, where Smith coming in cold had 45 yards on eight carries. Dallas outgained the Cardinals in yards 410–273 and won 17–10.

==== Week 4 First bye ====
For the first time in NFL history, teams were allowed two bye weeks.

==== Week 5 vs. Green Bay Packers ====
The Cowboys’ new kicker Eddie Murray booted five field goals as the Packers were crushed 36–14. Emmitt Smith had his first rushing score of the season.

==== Week 6 at Indianapolis Colts ====
While a Louisiana high school quarterback was winning multiple high school player of the year awards that year, the present day quarterbacks of the Colts (Jack Trudeau and ex-Packer Don Majkowski) were being intercepted four times by the Cowboys in a 27–3 runaway. Emmitt Smith burst past 100 yards on the game with a score.

==== Week 7 vs. San Francisco 49ers ====
Team	1	2	3	4	Total
49ers	10	0	7	0	17
• Cowboys	3	13	7	3	26

- Date: October 17
- Location: Texas Stadium, Dallas, Texas
- Game start: 3:00 p.m.
- Game weather: 69 °F (21 °C); wind 10 mph (16 km/h)
- Referee: Ed Hochuli
- TV announcers (CBS): Pat Summerall and John Madden

Scoring summary
Q1	SF	Eric Davis 4 yard fumble return (Mike Cofer kick)	SF 7–0
Q1	DAL	Eddie Murray 48 yard field goal	SF 7–3
Q1	SF	Mike Cofer 25 yard field goal	SF 10–3
Q2	DAL	Eddie Murray 39 yard field goal	SF 10–6
Q2	DAL	Emmitt Smith 1 yard run (Eddie Murray kick)	DAL 13–10
Q2	DAL	Eddie Murray 29 yard field goal	DAL 16–10
Q3	SF	Brent Jones 12 yard pass from Steve Young (Mike Cofer kick)	SF 17–16
Q3	DAL	Michael Irvin 36 yard pass from Troy Aikman (Eddie Murray kick)	DAL 23–17
Q4	DAL	Eddie Murray 18 yard field goal	DAL 26–17

- Michael Irvin 12 Rec, 168 Yds, 1TD

==== Halloween at Philadelphia Eagles ====
Emmitt Smith rushed for 237 yards as the Cowboys broke open a close game in the fourth quarter to win, 23–10. Troy Aikman and former Jet Ken O'Brien for the Eagles combined for just 203 yards and 23 incompletions.

==== Week 10 vs. New York Giants ====
With both teams at 5–2, the battle for the NFC East was joined at Texas Stadium and this game became another Cowboys runaway, as Troy Aikman scored two touchdowns and Emmitt Smith added two more. In falling 31–9, Phil Simms and Kent Graham were sacked a combined five times.

The win proved costly, as Aikman suffered a leg injury in the fourth quarter and would miss the next two games.

During halftime, the Cowboys inducted Tom Landry into their Ring Of Honor.

==== Week 11 vs. Phoenix Cardinals ====
Jimmy Johnson decided to start rookie Jason Garrett, but after Garrett proved ineffective with just two completions, Johnson benched him for recently signed ex-Brown Bernie Kosar, who completed thirteen passes for 199 yards and a touchdown, this despite an end zone intentional grounding penalty that made the final score 20–15 Cowboys.

==== Week 12 at Atlanta Falcons ====
Despite two touchdowns Kosar could not get a victory as the struggling Falcons triumphed 27–14. Emmitt Smith gained just one yard as the Cowboys were limited to 230 yards of offense to 400 for the Falcons.

==== Week 13 Thanksgiving vs. Miami Dolphins ====
Troy Aikman returned as the opening atop Texas Stadium allowed slushy snow onto the field. The Cowboys clawed to a 14–13 lead. In the final seconds, a Pete Stoyanovich field goal was blocked. The kick landed beyond the line of scrimmage, and once the ball stopped moving the play would be declared dead and Dallas would gain possession. However, the ball landed and began spinning on its tip, leading Cowboys lineman Leon Lett to try to gain possession. Lett slipped, fell, and knocked the ball forward. He had been pressed into service on the Cowboys' field goal block team despite having never played on special teams before. When it squirted off his foot, it became a live ball and the Dolphins recovered. Stoyanovich booted the ensuing field goal and the Dolphins had the 16–14 win.

While some teammates were angered at Lett’s gaffe, Jimmy Johnson blamed himself and reassured a disconsolate Lett in the locker room. It was Jimmy Johnson's last loss as Head Coach of Dallas.

==== Week 14 vs. Philadelphia Eagles ====
Despite being sacked four times, Troy Aikman completed seventeen passes for 178 yards and a first quarter score to Michael Irvin as the Cowboys led wire to wire and won 23–17. Emmitt Smith had 172 yards on the ground.

==== Week 15 at Minnesota Vikings ====
In a penalty-plagued game (twenty combined fouls for 124 yards) the Cowboys again led from start to finish in winning 37–20. Emmitt Smith added another 104 yards on the ground.

==== Week 16 at New York Jets ====
Team	1	2	3	4	Total
• Cowboys	0	7	14	7	28
Jets	0	0	0	7	7

- Date: December 18
- Location: Giants Stadium, East Rutherford, New Jersey
- Game start: 4:00 p.m.
- Game weather: 38 °F (3 °C); wind 10 mph (16 km/h)
- Referee: Gerald Austin
- TV announcers (CBS): Verne Lundquist and Dan Fouts

Scoring summary
Q2	DAL	Michael Irvin 42 yard pass from Troy Aikman (Eddie Murray kick)	DAL 7–0
Q3	DAL	Michael Irvin 3 yard pass from Troy Aikman (Eddie Murray kick)	DAL 14–0
Q3	DAL	Kevin Smith 32 yard interception return (Eddie Murray kick)	DAL 21–0
Q4	NYJ	Brad Baxter 1 yard run (Cary Blanchard kick)	DAL 21–7
Q4	DAL	Daryl Johnston 4 yard run (Eddie Murray kick)	DAL 28–7

==== Week 17 vs. Washington Redskins ====
The Redskins were obliterated 38–3 as Troy Aikman and Emmitt Smith accounted for 346 of Dallas’ 380 yards of offense.

==== Week 18 at New York Giants ====
Emmitt Smith put on a heroic effort overcoming a serious shoulder separation late in the second quarter to put up 229 yards of offense, 40 of them in overtime after the Giants tied the game. Eddie Murray's game winning field goal earned the Cowboys the division title and a first-round playoff bye. Following the game CBS broadcaster John Madden visited Smith in the locker room to shake his hand at his courage in finishing the game.

== Standings ==
NFC East
	W	L	T	PCT	PF	PA	STK
^{(1)} Dallas Cowboys	12	4	0	.750	376	229	W5
^{(4)} New York Giants	11	5	0	.688	288	205	L2
Philadelphia Eagles	8	8	0	.500	293	315	W3
Phoenix Cardinals	7	9	0	.438	326	269	W3
Washington Redskins	4	12	0	.250	230	345	L2

== Playoffs ==
=== Schedule ===
Round	Date	Opponent (seed)	Result	Record	Venue	Game Recap
Wild Card	First-round bye					
Divisional	January 16, 1994	Green Bay Packers (6)	W 27–17	1–0	Texas Stadium	Recap
NFC Championship	January 23, 1994	San Francisco 49ers (2)	W 38–21	2–0	Texas Stadium	Recap
Super Bowl XXVIII	January 30, 1994	Buffalo Bills (A1)	W 30–13	3–0	Georgia Dome	Recap

=== NFC Divisional Playoff ===
Dallas Cowboys 27, Green Bay Packers 17

Quarter	1	2	3	4	Total
Packers	3	0	7	7	17
Cowboys	0	17	7	3	27

at Texas Stadium, Irving, Texas

- Game time: 12:30 p.m. EST/11:30 a.m. CST
- Game weather: 50 °F (10 °C), cloudy
- Game attendance: 64,790
- Referee: Dick Hantak
- TV announcers (CBS): Jim Nantz and Randy Cross

=== NFC Championship Game ===
Dallas Cowboys 38, San Francisco 49ers 21

Quarter	1	2	3	4	Total
49ers	0	7	7	7	21
Cowboys	7	21	7	3	38

at Texas Stadium, Irving, Texas

- Game time: 4:00 p.m. EST/3:00 p.m. CST
- Game weather: 55 °F (13 °C), cloudy
- Game attendance: 64,902
- Referee: Jerry Markbreit
- TV announcers (CBS): Pat Summerall and John Madden

=== Super Bowl XXVIII ===
Dallas Cowboys 30, Buffalo Bills 13

Quarter	1	2	3	4	Total
Cowboys	6	0	14	10	30
Bills	3	10	0	0	13

at Georgia Dome, Atlanta

- Game time: 6:00 p.m. EST/5:00 p.m. CST
- Game weather: In Dome
- Game attendance: 72,817
- Referee: Bob McElwee
- TV announcers (NBC): Dick Enberg and Bob Trumpy
- Scoring summary
- DAL – FG: Eddie Murray 41 yards 3–0 DAL
- BUF – FG: Steve Christie 54 yards 3–3 tie
- DAL – FG: Eddie Murray 24 yards 6–3 DAL
- BUF – TD: Thurman Thomas 4 yard run (Steve Christie kick) 10–6 BUF
- BUF – FG: Steve Christie 28 yards 13–6 BUF
- DAL – TD: James Washington 46 yard fumble return (Eddie Murray kick) 13–13 tie
- DAL – TD: Emmitt Smith 17 yard run (Eddie Murray kick) 20–13 DAL
- DAL – TD: Emmitt Smith 1 yard run (Eddie Murray kick) 27–13 DAL
- DAL – FG: Eddie Murray 20 yards 30–13 DAL

== Staff ==
1993 Dallas Cowboys staff
Front office: Owner/president/general manager – Jerry Jones; Public relations director – Rich Dalrymple; Head coaches: Head coach – Jimmy Johnson; Offensive coaches: Offensive coordinator – Norv Turner; Running backs – Joe Brodsky; Wide receivers – Hubbard Alexander; Tight ends - Robert Ford; Offensive line – Hudson Houck	Defensive coaches: Defensive coordinator – Butch Davis; Defensive line – John Blake; Defensive backs – Dave Campo; Special teams coaches: Special teams – Joe Avezzano; Kicking/offensive and defensive quality control – Steve Hoffman; Strength and conditioning: Strength and conditioning – Mike Woicik

== Roster ==
Dallas Cowboys 1993 roster
Quarterbacks: 8 Troy Aikman; 17 Jason Garrett; 18 Bernie Kosar; Running backs: 34 Tommie Agee FB; 44 Lincoln Coleman FB; 39 Derrick Gainer; 48 Daryl Johnston FB; 25 Derrick Lassic; 22 Emmitt Smith; Wide receivers: 81 Tim Daniel; 80 Alvin Harper; 88 Michael Irvin; 85 Kevin Williams KR/PR; 86 Tyrone Williams; Tight ends: 89 Scott Galbraith; 83 Joey Mickey; 84 Jay Novacek	Offensive linemen: 68 Frank Cornish C; 63 John Gesek G; 66 Kevin Gogan G; 61 Nate Newton G; 62 James Parrish T; 65 Ron Stone G; 71 Mark Tuinei T; 79 Erik Williams T; Defensive linemen: 75 Tony Casillas DT; 94 Charles Haley DE; 95 Chad Hennings DT; 77 Jim Jeffcoat DE; 97 Jimmie Jones DT; 78 Leon Lett DT; 67 Russell Maryland DT; 92 Tony Tolbert DE	Linebackers: 58 Dixon Edwards OLB; 55 Robert Jones MLB; 98 Godfrey Myles OLB; 51 Ken Norton Jr. MLB/OLB; 59 Darrin Smith OLB; 91 Matt Vanderbeek OLB; Defensive backs: 40 Bill Bates SS; 24 Larry Brown CB; 27 Thomas Everett FS; 46 Joe Fishback FS; 29 Kenneth Gant CB/S; 31 Brock Marion FS; 43 Elvis Patterson CB/S; 26 Kevin Smith CB; 41 Dave Thomas CB; 37 James Washington SS; 28 Darren Woodson SS; Special teams: 70 Dale Hellestrae LS; 19 John Jett P; 3 Eddie Murray K	Reserve lists: 47 Clayton Holmes CB (IR); 73 Brian Nielsen G (IR); -- Jim Price TE (IR); 87 Alfredo Roberts TE (IR); 82 Jimmy Smith WR (NF=ill); 53 Mark Stepnoski C (IR); -- Fallon Wacasey TE (IR); Practice squad: —- Coleman Bell TE; 32 Judd Garrett RB; Rookies in italics 53 active, 7 inactive, 2 practice squad

== Awards and records ==
- Emmitt Smith, UPI NFC Player of the Year
- Emmitt Smith, Most Valuable Player, Super Bowl XXVIII
- Emmitt Smith, Bert Bell Award
- Emmitt Smith, Best NFL Player ESPY Award
- Emmitt Smith, Most Valuable Player, NFL
- Emmitt Smith, NFL rushing leader

== Publications ==
- The Football Encyclopedia ISBN 0-312-11435-4
- Total Football ISBN 0-06-270170-3
- Cowboys Have Always Been My Heroes ISBN 0-446-51950-2
