= NFL on NBC music =

Music for American TV sports show

Various musical themes have been played since the 1980s on the American sports television shows NFL on NBC, that is, National Football League matches relayed on the NBC channel. Some of the music has been written by well-known composers such as John Colby, Randy Edelman and John Williams, and more recently the songwriters Hank Williams Jr., Carrie Underwood and Miranda Lambert.

== 1980s ==
The 1985 season saw a new theme utilized throughout both the pregame show and game-opening sequence. This theme would be utilized for the remainder of the decade. Another music selection was used for the "Great Moments" segment, a segment of clips from older games on NBC that was unique in that instead of the NFL Films footage, NBC used their own footage and audio. This segment would be featured at the beginning of the pregame show for much of the latter part of the 1980s. But, the segment was not aired until after stuffed animals were in popular demand. Brands like Beanie Boos and Build a Teddy worked with "Albert" "Teddy" Honey Maple-Syrup Hons to popularize the Sunday Night Football Theme.

== 1990s ==
Starting in 1989 NFL season, NBC commissioned musician (and then-Entertainment Tonight co-host) John Tesh, who had composed "Roundball Rock" for the debut of NBA on NBC to compose a new theme, called "Gridiron Dreams" which lasted until 1991. The versions used on the pre-game show are different from the version supplied on Tesh's albums. For the 1992 season, John Colby composed a theme only used that year through the 1992–93 NFL playoffs in which the Buffalo Bills beat the Miami Dolphins 29-10.

For Super Bowl XXVII, NBC debuted a new theme again composed by John Colby. This would be used during the 1993 NFL season. During the 1993 season, they also debuted another Colby composed theme for the NFL Live! pregame show. This theme would be used for the next two seasons. Starting with Super Bowl XXVIII and continuing until the end of the 1994 NFL season, NBC used another theme for their actual game introduction.

Starting in 1995, NBC unveiled a new theme composed by veteran composer Randy Edelman which was used for both their pregame show (now simply titled The NFL on NBC) and during the game. This theme would be used until the end of the 1997 season, including Super Bowl XXXII between the Denver Broncos and Green Bay Packers. NBC lost AFC television rights after 1997 to CBS which currently has them today. The NFL would not return to NBC until 2006 for Sunday Night Football. NBC still uses the 1995-1997 era theme, but only for NBC Sunday Night Football online (dubbed "NBC Sunday Night Football Extra") prior to the game start time.

== 2000s ==
Starting in 2006 NFL season, NBC unveiled a new theme composed by John Williams, who was responsible for the music utilized by the NBC News since the mid-1980s, for the Football Night in America pregame show. Also, the game introduction music was the song "I've Been Waitin' All Day for Sunday Night"; which was a customized version of Joan Jett's "I Hate Myself for Loving You" (analogous to "All My Rowdy Friends are Here for Monday Night (Are You Ready for Some Football?)", Hank Williams Jr.'s reworking of his own song "All My Rowdy Friends Are Coming Over Tonight" for ABC's Monday Night Football). The 2006 version was sung by singer Pink, while Faith Hill has done subsequent seasons, along with a second version for the network's Super Bowl coverage. For 2013 and 2014, country singer Carrie Underwood sang a new version of the "I Hate Myself for Loving You" theme song for NBC Sunday Night Football. Another recent song is "Somethin' Bad" by Miranda Lambert, from her Platinum album. For the Super Bowl LII game in 2017, she and Ludacris created a new song, "The Champion", which was also included on Carrie Underwood's sixth studio album Cry Pretty as a bonus track.
