= Tim Daniel =

American gridiron football player (born 1969)

No. 81
- Position: Wide receiver

Personal information
- Born: September 14, 1969 (age 57); Atlanta, Georgia, U.S.
- Listed height: 5 ft 11 in (1.80 m)
- Listed weight: 184 lb (83 kg)

Career information
- High school: Mays (Atlanta)
- College: Florida A&M
- NFL draft: 1992: 11th round, 302nd overall pick

Career history
- Dallas Cowboys (1992–1993); Winnipeg Blue Bombers (1994–1995)

Awards and highlights
- 2× Super Bowl champion (XXVII, XXVIII)

Tim Daniel (born September 14, 1969) is an American former professional football wide receiver in the Canadian Football League (CFL) for the Winnipeg Blue Bombers. He was selected by the Dallas Cowboys in the eleventh round of the 1992 NFL draft. He played college football at Florida A&M University.

== Early life and college ==
Daniel attended Benjamin Elijah Mays High School, while earning All-conference and All-county honors in football and track as a senior. He walked-on at Florida A&M University, but was used mostly as a blocker in his freshman season.

The previous two years (1986 and 1987) the run-oriented offense averaged only around 70 passing yards per game, but over the following seasons with the arrival of quarterback Antoine "Tony" Ezell, (who would become the school's all-time passing leader), the team averaged 238 passing yards per game. As a sophomore, he saw his first real production in the passing game, making 12 receptions for 198 yards and one touchdown.

In 1990, Daniel was the deep threat in a group of wide receivers known as the Stallions. He posted 19 receptions for 512 yards and a conference leading 26.9 yard per catch, while helping the Rattlers win their first outright Mid-Eastern Athletic Conference championship with a 6-0 record in conference games. In his finest game as a collegian against Delaware State University, he set a school record with 152 receiving yards and 2 touchdowns on four receptions, breaking the old mark of 150 yards set by Ray Alexander against Howard University in 1983. In that game, Daniel had a 98-yard touchdown reception, the second-longest in school and conference history.

As a senior, he finished second on the team with a career-high 30 receptions (second on the team) and a career-high of 580 receiving yards (led the team) and 3 touchdowns. In the season opener against Tuskegee University, he had 3 receptions for 115 yards, including an 80-yard touchdown. In his final contest against Bethune–Cookman University, he had a single-game career-high of 9 receptions (second in school history) for 141 yards and one touchdown.

In his college career he recorded 61 receptions for 1,290 yards and 7 touchdowns. He averaged 21.1 yards per reception and a touchdown every 8.7 catches, contributing to four straight winning seasons.

== Professional career ==
=== Dallas Cowboys ===
Daniel was selected by the Dallas Cowboys in the 11th round (302nd overall) of the 1992 NFL draft, because of his speed (4.38 seconds in the 40-yard dash). As a rookie, he injured his right hamstring in mini-camp and was placed on the physically unable to perform list for the whole year.

In 1993, he made the roster, but was declared inactive for every game including Super Bowl XXVIII. He was re-signed on July 13, 1994, before being waived on August 17.

=== Winnipeg Blue Bombers ===
Daniel played for Winnipeg Blue Bombers of the Canadian Football League from 1994 to 1995, recording 1,091 all-purpose yards and 4 touchdowns.
