= Lincoln Coleman =

American football player (born 1969)

No. 44
- Position: Fullback

Personal information
- Born: August 12, 1969 (age 57); Dallas, Texas, U.S.
- Listed height: 6 ft 1 in (1.85 m)
- Listed weight: 252 lb (114 kg)

Career information
- High school: Bryan Adams (East Dallas, Texas)
- College: Baylor
- NFL draft: 1993: undrafted

Career history
- Dallas Texans (1993); Dallas Cowboys (1993–1994); Atlanta Falcons (1995)*; Atlanta Falcons (1996); Milwaukee Mustangs (1997, 1999–2000); Grand Rapids Rampage (2001)
- * Offseason or practice squad member only

Awards and highlights
- Super Bowl champion (XXVIII); ArenaBowl champion (2001)

Career NFL statistics
- Games played: 18
- Rushing attempts: 98
- Rushing yards: 312
- Rushing average: 3.2
- Touchdowns: 3
- Receiving yards: 70
- Stats at Pro Football Reference

Career AFL statistics
- Rush Att-Yards-TDs: 191-736-25
- Rec-Yards-Tds: 19-211-2
- Tackles: 58
- Sacks: 2
- Fumble recoveries: 3
- Stats at ArenaFan.com

Lincoln Cales Coleman, Jr. (born August 12, 1969) is an American former professional football player who was a fullback in the National Football League (NFL) for the Dallas Cowboys and Atlanta Falcons. He also was a member of the Dallas Texans, Milwaukee Mustangs and Grand Rapids Rampage of the Arena Football League (AFL). He played college football for the Baylor Bears.

== Early life ==
Coleman attended Bryan Adams High School, where he was named prep All-American and All-state at running back, after rushing for 1,521 yards as a senior. He was a highly sought after prospect and accepted a football scholarship from the University of Notre Dame in 1987.

As a freshman, he recorded six carries for 20 yards as a running back, before being converted in to a defensive back and making six tackles. He also played on special teams as a member of the travel squad. Looking to play at running back, he decided to transfer to the University of Texas in 1988. When the move fell through, he transferred instead to Baylor University.

In his redshirt year (due to NCAA transfer rules), he was given an award for excellence as a practice squad player. As a sophomore, he appeared in 11 games, rushing for 368 yards (second on the team) and three touchdowns. He left the school at the end of the 1989 season, after not meeting the academic requirements.

== Professional career ==
Coleman played football for the semi-professional team the Dallas Colts, while also working as a lot man at Home Depot from 1991 to 1992.

In 1993, he was working loading docks at Marshall Field's, when he signed with the Dallas Texans of the Arena Football League as a part-time job. He was discovered by a Dallas Cowboys trainer (Kevin O'Neill) instead of a scout, while he was watching a Texans game on television.

Because he was bothered by an Achilles tendon injury, he was signed by the Cowboys as an undrafted free agent until August 12. He was waived on August 30, but showed enough potential to be signed to the team's practice squad two days later.

On November 17, he was promoted to the active roster to backup both Emmitt Smith and Darryl Johnston. His NFL debut was in the infamous Leon Lett Thanksgiving game against the Miami Dolphins, replacing an injured Smith and displaying a punishing running style through a sleet-marred field, while rushing for 57 yards on 10 carries. Although his efforts were lost around all of the media attention that focused on the ending, the game allowed him to pass fellow rookie Derrick Lassic on the depth chart as the new second-string running back. The team went on to become a Super Bowl Champion that season.

In 1994, he developed a substance abuse problem and reported to training camp out of shape and overweight at 256 pounds. He was cut on September 6. He was re-signed on September 11. On December 1, the Cowboys signed Blair Thomas to be Smith's backup and Coleman was demoted to third-string running back. He was not re-signed after the season.

On July 21, 1995, he was signed as a free agent by the Atlanta Falcons. He was released on August 27. He was re-signed on February 1, 1996. He was cut on August 19, only to be re-signed on September 4. He was released on September 24 to make room for quarterback Browning Nagle.

In 1997, he was one of the Arena Football League best rushers with 246 yards, while playing for the Milwaukee Mustangs. The next year, he was suspended by the league for undisclosed reasons. He returned in 1999 and led the Mustangs with 138 rushing yards and four rushing touchdowns. He helped the Grand Rapids Rampage win the ArenaBowl XV in 2001.

== Personal life ==
After he retired from professional football in 2001, he became an assistant football coach at Creston High School. In 2003, he was named the school's head coach, where he helped develop the football player of the year for the state of Michigan (Justin Hoskins), who went on to play for the University of Notre Dame.

In 2007, he moved back to Dallas and became a position coach at W. W. Samuell High School for two years while being the sophomore history teacher. In 2015, he moved to Delray Beach, Florida.
