= James Washington (safety) =

American football player (born 1965)

No. 37
- Position: Safety

Personal information
- Born: January 10, 1965 (age 61); Los Angeles, California, U.S.
- Listed height: 6 ft 1 in (1.85 m)
- Listed weight: 209 lb (95 kg)

Career information
- High school: Jordan (Los Angeles)
- College: UCLA
- NFL draft: 1988: 5th round, 137th overall pick

Career history
- Los Angeles Rams (1988–1989); Dallas Cowboys (1990–1994); Washington Redskins (1995)

Awards and highlights
- 2× Super Bowl champion (XXVII, XXVIII); Third-team All-American (1986); Second-team All-Pac-10 (1985)

Career NFL statistics
- Interceptions: 17
- Tackles: 485
- Fumble recoveries: 7
- Stats at Pro Football Reference

James McArthur Washington (born January 10, 1965) is an American former professional football player who was a safety in the National Football League (NFL) for the Los Angeles Rams, Dallas Cowboys and the Washington Redskins. With the Cowboys, Washington won back-to-back titles in Super Bowl XXVII and Super Bowl XXVIII, both against the Buffalo Bills. He played college football for the UCLA Bruins.

== Early life ==
Washington attended Jordan High School, before accepting a scholarship from UCLA.

In 1984, he was named the starter at free safety and registered a school record for a freshman 119 tackles. He was a standout defensive back, finishing as a four-year starter with 339 tackles and 15 interceptions.

He played in the 1984 Rose Bowl, 1985 Fiesta Bowl, 1986 Rose Bowl, 1986 Freedom Bowl, and the 1987 Aloha Bowl. He was the co-most valuable player of the game in the 1985 Fiesta Bowl. Washington has a BA degree in history from UCLA, Master in Education from APU and is a member of Phi Beta Sigma fraternity.

== Professional career ==
Pre-draft measurables
Height	Weight	Hand span	40-yard dash	10-yard split	20-yard split	20-yard shuttle	Vertical jump	Broad jump	Bench press
6 ft 0 7/8 in (1.85 m)	191 lb (87 kg)	7 1/2 in (0.19 m)	4.45 s	1.68 s	2.78 s	4.43 s	34.0 in (0.86 m)	9 ft 8 in (2.95 m)	6 reps
All values from NFL Combine

=== Los Angeles Rams ===
Washington was selected by the Los Angeles Rams in the fifth round (137th overall) of the 1988 NFL draft, after dropping because he tore the same knee ligament as a junior and senior.

On November 6, 1989, he was placed on the injured reserve list with a thigh injury he suffered in the ninth game against the Minnesota Vikings. He was activated on December 28, in time for the playoffs. He replaced an injured Vince Newsome at free safety in the NFC title game and posted 9 unassisted tackles, during a 3–30 loss against the San Francisco 49ers.

Playing sparingly as a reserve during his first two years in the league, the Rams left him unprotected—eligible to sign with any team—under Plan B free agency at the end of the 1989 season.

=== Dallas Cowboys ===
On March 30, 1990, he was signed in Plan B free agency by the Dallas Cowboys, where he became one of the hardest hitting defensive backs in the league, earning the nickname "Drive-by". Even though he started only 10 games at strong safety, he tied for the team lead in interceptions (3).

In 1991, he became the regular starter at strong safety. The next year, he began the season as the starter until the Cowboys acquired Thomas Everett. Although he was relegated briefly to the bench, a knee injury to Ray Horton allowed him to take over the role of free safety (9 starts) and finish tied for the team lead with 3 interceptions. In Super Bowl XXVII against the Buffalo Bills, he made an interception in the first quarter, that resulted in the first Cowboys touchdown and began a turnover fest-a Super Bowl record nine.

Washington lost his starting spot during the 1993 training camp, because of the emergence of second year safety Darren Woodson. Throughout the season, Washington was a reserve and a nickel defensive back. In Super Bowl XXVIII the Buffalo Bills ran a three receiver single back formation and the Cowboys base defense most of the day would be in nickel (5 defensive backs), so Washington started the game at free safety. He made the best of this starting opportunity by recording a fumble return for a touchdown, with the help of a forced fumble by Leon Lett.

In 1994, the departure of Thomas Everett opened the door for Washington to start 16 games at his natural position free safety, tie for the team lead with 5 interceptions and register 101 tackles (fifth on the team). He was the defensive signal caller for the Cowboys when the team was the top-ranked defense in the league (1992 and 1994).

=== Washington Redskins ===
On March 2, 1995, he signed a free agent contract with the Washington Redskins and started 12 games that season. That year included an incident at the infamous green fence at RFK Stadium, in which Washington attempted to punch a Redskin fan who was giving him grief for his subpar play the prior week. He was released by the Redskins on August 13, 1996.

Washington played in the NFL for eight seasons and intercepted 17 passes.

== Super Bowl XXVIII ==
One of his most notable performances was in Super Bowl XXVIII when Thurman Thomas, after being tackled by Leon Lett, fumbled the ball, Washington returned it for a 46-yard touchdown to tie the game (13–13).

He also made a team-high 11 tackles, had an interception that eventually became an Emmitt Smith touchdown, forced a fumble to set up a field goal and knocked wide receiver Andre Reed to the sidelines for a brief recovery time (sending a message to the Bills receivers). His performance was so dominating, that he received strong MVP consideration.

== Halftime fight incident ==
While playing for the Cowboys, Washington was briefly the subject of notoriety for his part in an on-field fight during halftime at a November 7, 1994, game against the New York Giants in Dallas. The player grabbed the camera and monopod of Dallas Morning News photographer David Leeson in an attempt to defend teammate Alvin Harper. Although Washington did not strike anyone with the equipment, he was fined for his actions, as were Michael Irvin, Cowboys assistant coach Hubbard Alexander, and Giants players Tito Wooten and Jarvis Williams.

The event was so memorable to local sports journalists that they not only included it in a year-end roundup, but were still writing about it two years later. "There were a lot of Giants, and I didn't see any of my teammates," Washington said at the time. "I just felt me and Michael were being rushed, and I wanted to keep them off Michael. It was foolish. I didn't hit anybody with it, but there was really no reason for it."

== Personal life ==
On April 26, 2010, Washington was named Director of Scholarships He is responsible for raising scholarship funds for the campus and increasing the visibility of the Bruin Scholars Initiative.

He was the co-host of FOX Sports Radio's flagship morning show Out of Bounds with Craig Shemon. He was also featured on Foxsports.net's interactive video college football breakdowns. Washington still serves as an analyst during UCLA football games for Fox Sports. Washington produces and host the UCLA coaches show that air FSN.

Shelter 37, Inc. was founded by Washington in 1993 as a not-for-profit public benefit corporation that provides after-school enrichment and life skills programs in Southern California.
