= John Jett =

American football player (born 1968)

No. 19, 18
- Position: Punter

Personal information
- Born: November 11, 1968 (age 57); Richmond, Virginia, U.S.
- Listed height: 6 ft 0 in (1.83 m)
- Listed weight: 197 lb (89 kg)

Career information
- High school: Northumberland (VA)
- College: East Carolina
- NFL draft: 1992: undrafted

Career history
- Minnesota Vikings (1992)*; Dallas Cowboys (1993–1996); Detroit Lions (1997–2003)
- * Offseason or practice squad member only

Awards and highlights
- 2× Super Bowl champion (XXVIII, XXX); PFWA All-Rookie Team (1993); Second-team All-South Independent (1991)

Career NFL statistics
- Punts: 756
- Punting yards: 32,087
- Punting avg: 42.4
- Stats at Pro Football Reference

John Jett (born November 11, 1968) is an American former professional football player who was a punter in the National Football League (NFL) for the Dallas Cowboys and the Detroit Lions. He played college football for East Carolina University. Jett won two Super Bowl rings with the Cowboys in Super Bowl XXVIII and Super Bowl XXX.

== Early life ==
Jett attended Northumberland High School where he played football and baseball, receiving All-State honors as a pitcher and outfielder.

Although Jett came to East Carolina University as an unrecruited walk-on athlete, he became a 4-year starter at Punter. He graduated after recording two of the three best single season averages in school history, setting the records for career punting average (40.0) and yards-per-punt average in a season (42.2).

In 2007, he was inducted into the East Carolina Athletics Hall of Fame.

== Professional career ==
=== Minnesota Vikings ===
Jett was signed as an undrafted free agent by the Minnesota Vikings in 1992 and was released before the start of the season.

=== Dallas Cowboys ===
On March 10, 1993, he was signed by the Dallas Cowboys and replaced Mike Saxon on the defending Super Bowl champion. He finished the year with a 41.8 yards gross average, third in the NFC in net punting average (37.7) and led the league in percentage of punts downed inside the 20-yard line (39.3%).

In 1994, he had a gross average of 41.9 yards (sixth in the NFC), led the league in percentage of punts downed inside the 20-yard line (37.1%) and his 26 punts that landed inside the 20-yard line were the third highest ever in franchise history. In the divisional playoff win against the Green Bay Packers, he registered the third best punting performance in Cowboys playoff history, with a 45.8 yard gross average.

In 1995, he had a gross average of 40.9 yards and a net average of 34.5. After a block, in the NFC Championship Game win against the Green Bay Packers, he went on to average 45.8 yards and tie the mark for the third highest punting average in the franchise postseason history, receiving NFC Special Teams Player of the Week honors. The next year, he was fourth in the NFC in net average (36.8 yards).

During his time with the team, he led the NFL in punts inside the 20 yard-line for four straight seasons.

=== Detroit Lions ===
Jett was signed as a free agent by the Detroit Lions in 1997, after the salary cap-strapped Cowboys could not afford to re-sign him.

In 2000, he was named as an alternate to the Pro Bowl.

He missed three games with a calf injury in 2001. The next year, he was second in the NFC in net average (38 yards), sixth in gross average (42.2 yards) and third in punts inside the 20-yard line (29).

On October 30, 2003, he was placed on the injured reserve list, with what turned out to be a career-ending calf injury.

== NFL career statistics ==
Legend
	Won the Super Bowl
	Led the league
**Bold**	Career high

Year	Team	Punting									
Year	Team	GP	Punts	Yds	Net Yds	Lng	Avg	Net Avg	Blk	Ins20	TB
1993	DAL	16	56	2,342	2,113	59	41.8	37.7	0	22	3
1994	DAL	16	70	2,935	2,477	58	41.9	35.4	0	26	4
1995	DAL	16	53	2,166	1,830	58	40.9	34.5	0	17	6
1996	DAL	16	74	3,150	2,721	60	42.6	36.8	0	22	9
1997	DET	16	84	3,576	3,062	60	42.6	35.6	**2**	24	4
1998	DET	14	66	2,892	2,374	60	**43.8**	36.0	0	17	6
1999	DET	16	86	3,637	2,995	**62**	42.3	34.8	0	27	**12**
2000	DET	16	**93**	**4,044**	3,306	59	43.5	34.8	**2**	**33**	**12**
2001	DET	13	58	2,512	2,060	**62**	43.3	35.5	0	16	6
2002	DET	16	91	3,838	**3,459**	57	42.2	**38.0**	0	29	7
2003	DET	4	25	995	890	58	39.8	35.6	0	8	3
Career		159	756	32,087	27,287	62	42.4	35.9	4	241	72
