= Derrick Lassic =

American football player (born 1970)

No. 25
- Position: Running back

Personal information
- Born: January 26, 1970 (age 56); Haverstraw, New York, U.S.
- Listed height: 5 ft 10 in (1.78 m)
- Listed weight: 205 lb (93 kg)

Career information
- High school: North Rockland (Thiells, New York)
- College: Alabama
- NFL draft: 1993: 4th round, 94th overall pick
- Expansion draft: 1995: 20th round, 40th overall pick

Career history
- Dallas Cowboys (1993–1994); Carolina Panthers (1995)*; San Francisco 49ers (1996)*; Toronto Argonauts (1998)*
- * Offseason or practice squad member only

Awards and highlights
- Super Bowl champion (XXVIII); National champion (1992); Second-team All-SEC (1992)

Career NFL statistics
- Games played: 10
- Games started: 3
- Rushing yards: 269
- Rushing touchdowns: 3
- Stats at Pro Football Reference

Derrick Owens Lassic (born January 26, 1970) is an American former professional football player who was a running back in the National Football League (NFL) for the Dallas Cowboys. He played college football for the Alabama Crimson Tide.

== Early life ==
Lassic attended North Rockland High School, where he helped his team achieve three straight Section 1 Class A bowl wins. As a senior, he set county records with 1,719 rushing yards, 31 total touchdowns, 26 rushing touchdowns and 194 scored points. He was named the New York State large-school Player of the Year, All-state and a USA Today's High School All-American. He also had 31 receptions for 586 yards.

He finished his high school career with 2,846 rushing yards. He also practiced track and baseball.

== College career ==
Lassic accepted a football scholarship from the University of Alabama. As a redshirt freshman, he appeared in 10 games and was fifth on the team with 142 rushing yards on 33 carries. In the 32–16 win against Louisiana State University, he rushed for 58 yards on 8 carries. In the 37–14 win against the University of Southern Mississippi, he made 4 receptions for 80 yards, including a 54-yard catch. That season, Alabama won its first SEC championship since 1981.

As a sophomore, he was slowed by a turf toe injury, rushing for 281 yards on 68 carries. He scored his first touchdown (an 18-yard run) in the season opener 24–27 loss against the University of Southern Mississippi. He missed the eighth game against Mississippi State University because of his toe injury. He had 11 carries for 67 yards against the University of Cincinnati.

As a junior, he was the backup running back behind Siran Stacy, posting 70 carries for 368 rushing yards (third on the team) and 2 touchdowns. He had 9 carries for 70 yards against Vanderbilt University. He compiled 10 carries for 76 yards against the University of Tennessee-Chattanooga.

As a senior, he was named the starter at running back, registering 905 rushing yards (fifth in the SEC) on 178 carries (5.1 yards per carry), 10 rushing touchdowns, 129 receiving yards and one receiving touchdown. He was named the 1993 Sugar Bowl MVP after Alabama beat Miami 34–13 to win the National Championship. He finished his college career 11th on the school's all-time rushing list (1,696 yards).

== Professional career ==
Pre-draft measurables
Height	Weight	Arm length	Hand span	Bench press
5 ft 9 5/8 in (1.77 m)	192 lb (87 kg)	29 5/8 in (0.75 m)	9 1/8 in (0.23 m)	10 reps
All values from NFL Combine

=== Dallas Cowboys ===
Lassic was selected by the Dallas Cowboys in the fourth round (94th overall) of the 1993 NFL draft. The team was forced to start him in the first two games (both losses) after Emmitt Smith’s contract holdout extended into the regular season. He became the first rookie running back in league history to start a season opener for a defending Super Bowl champion, and the third rookie running back in franchise history to start a season opener.

Although Smith signed in time for the third game against the Phoenix Cardinals, Lassic still started and led the team in rushing with 60 yards on 14 carries, while scoring his first 2 touchdowns during a 17–10 win. From that point his workload was significantly reduced, on the way to the Cowboys winning back-to-back Super Bowls. In the eleventh game against the Miami Dolphins, he was demoted to third-string running back after being passed on the depth chart by fellow rookie Lincoln Coleman. In the thirteenth game against the Minnesota Vikings, he lined up at receiver to compensate the loss of an injured Alvin Harper, when the team used three wide receiver sets. He was declared inactive in the final three games of the season. In the Cowboys’ playoff run he was limited to four touches; he was in the backfield for the final play of Super Bowl XXVIII.

He finished with 75 carries for 269 yards and three touchdowns, but he suffered from the national pressure and the loyalty his teammates had towards Smith. Erik Williams criticized Lassic's running style, saying "He runs too fast. We have a flow and he isn't able to see it", Nate Newton said, "Lassic was a nice kid, but if we expected to get back to the Super Bowl, we needed Emmitt in the lineup".

In 1994, he tore his right quadricep muscle during kickoff coverage duty, in the Cowboys' 17-9 preseason win against the Minnesota Vikings. He was placed on the injured reserve list on December 6, 1994.

In Cowboys lore, he is remembered for being the starting running back for the first two games of the 1993 season when Smith held out in a contract dispute.

=== Carolina Panthers ===
The Carolina Panthers selected him from the Cowboys roster in the 20th round (40th overall) of the 1995 NFL expansion draft. He was waived with an injury settlement on August 27, after suffering from knee, hamstring and thigh problems during training camp.

=== San Francisco 49ers ===
On March 18, 1996, Lassic signed with the San Francisco 49ers. He was waived on July 29.

=== Toronto Argonauts ===
In 1998, he signed with the Toronto Argonauts of the Canadian Football League and was waived on August 17.
