= Leon Lett =

American football player and coach (born 1968)

No. 78, 94
- Position: Defensive tackle

Personal information
- Born: October 12, 1968 (age 58); Mobile, Alabama, U.S.
- Listed height: 6 ft 6 in (1.98 m)
- Listed weight: 290 lb (132 kg)

Career information
- High school: Fairhope (Fairhope, Alabama)
- College: Hinds (1987–1988); Emporia State (1989–1990)
- NFL draft: 1991: 7th round, 173rd overall pick

Career history

Playing
- Dallas Cowboys (1991–2000); Denver Broncos (2001)

Coaching
- UNLV (2009) Volunteer assistant; Louisiana–Monroe (2010) Defensive tackle coach; Dallas Cowboys (2011–2022) Assistant defensive line coach

Awards and highlights
- 3× Super Bowl champion (XXVII, XXVIII, XXX); 2× Pro Bowl (1994, 1998)

Career NFL statistics
- Tackles: 361
- Sacks: 22.5
- Forced fumbles: 8
- Fumble recoveries: 7
- Stats at Pro Football Reference

Leon Lett Jr. (born October 12, 1968) is an American former professional football defensive tackle who played in the National Football League (NFL) for 11 seasons, primarily with the Dallas Cowboys. Lett played college football for the Emporia State Hornets and was selected in the seventh round of the 1991 NFL draft by the Cowboys, where he spent 10 seasons. During his final season in 2001, he played for the Denver Broncos.

With the Cowboys, Lett received two Pro Bowl selections and won three Super Bowl titles. He is also remembered for two botched plays—a fumble before scoring a touchdown in Super Bowl XXVII and a failed recovery after a blocked field goal in a Thanksgiving game—although he would help his team win the Super Bowl in both seasons. After retiring, Lett served as the assistant defensive line coach for the Cowboys from 2011 to 2022.

== Early life ==
Lett attended Fairhope High School in Fairhope, Alabama where he lettered in football and basketball. He received a scholarship from Auburn University, but after a low score on the ACT, he had to play two seasons at Hinds Community College in Raymond, Mississippi, compiling 141 tackles, 10 sacks, nine pass deflections and three fumble recoveries.

He was set to move to New Mexico State University, but after having problems with his transfer credits, he accepted a partial scholarship offer from Emporia State University in Kansas.

As a junior in 1989, he helped the team win the Central States Intercollegiate Conference (CSIC) title and reach their first NAIA Football National Championship game. After leading the team in pass deflections (10) and blocked kicks (two) and finishing second in tackles (83) and sacks (5), he received honorable mention NAIA All-America, All-NAIA District 10 and All-CSIC honors.

During his two years at Emporia State, the defense held opponents to 4.1 yards-per-play and 3.1 yards-per-carry. He earned All-NAIA District 10 recognition as a senior and finished second in the team in sacks (4), but pro scouts lost interest when he missed his first three games with a right knee injury and wasn't invited to any senior All-Star games or the NFL Scouting Combine.

In 2010, he was inducted into the Emporia State University Athletics Hall of Honor. In 2013, he was inducted into the National Junior College Athletic Association (NJCAA) Football Coaches Association Hall of Fame.

== Professional career ==
=== Dallas Cowboys ===
Lett was selected by the Dallas Cowboys in the seventh round (173rd overall) of the 1991 NFL draft. As a rookie, he was placed on the injured reserve list with a lower back problem on August 27. He was re-activated on November 21 and played as a reserve defensive tackle during the last five games of the season and in the playoffs. After entering the league at 6'6" and 260 pounds, by the end of his rookie year, he had put on 16 more pounds.

In his second season, he blossomed into a key player in the Cowboys' defensive line rotation and his teammates nicknamed him "Big Cat" in reference to his agility. Playing mainly as a defensive right tackle in passing situations, he finished the regular season with 19 quarterback pressures (tied for second on the team) and four passes deflected (led the team). In the postseason, he was one of the defense's best players, tying for the team lead with two tackles for losses and leading the team with three forced fumbles. In Super Bowl XXVII, he nearly set the record for the longest fumble return in Super Bowl history (64 yards). However, Lett prematurely began to celebrate and the ball was knocked out of his hand by Bills receiver Don Beebe which resulted in a touchback. He also sacked Frank Reich on the game's final play.

In 1993, he fractured his right ankle in the third game of the season, re-injuring a fracture suffered during offseason workouts. Upon his return after missing 5 games, he played the four positions along the defensive line at different times. After playing in 11 contests, he led all defensive linemen in passes deflected (4) for the second straight season. In the divisional playoff game against the Green Bay Packers, he registered 6 tackles (1 for loss), 2 passes deflected (one was intercepted), 3 quarterback pressures and recovered a fumble. In Super Bowl XXVIII, besides having 6 tackles, he forced Thurman Thomas to fumble in the third quarter, leading to a James Washington 46 yards return for a touchdown, which tied the score at 13–13 and changed the momentum of the game.

In 1994, he started all 16 contests and was named to his first Pro Bowl after finishing with 68 tackles, 4 sacks and 26 quarterback pressures (second on the team).

In 1995, he served a four-game suspension in the middle of the season, before returning strong during the team drive to Super Bowl XXX, registering in the last four regular season games 22 tackles, 2 sacks, 12 quarterback pressures, a forced fumble and a recovered fumble.

Lett would be suspended at different times for violating the NFL substance abuse policy, missing a total of 28 games during his career. He served an additional full 16-game suspension (3 games in 1996 and 13 contests of 1997) and an eight-game suspension at the start of the 1999 season.

In 1998, he earned his second Pro Bowl selection after starting 15 games, recording 51 tackles, 20 quarterback pressures (second on the team), 7 tackles for loss (led the team) and 4 sacks (third on the team).

His last season in Dallas was 2000, when he played in 9 games (7 starts), registered 35 tackles (14 solo), 2.5 sacks, 4 passes deflected and one forced fumble. He sprained his left medial collateral ligament during a November practice and was inactive for five games, before being placed on the injured reserve list on December 14.

When Lett was playing, he was one of the most feared defensive players in the game. Even though he was constantly double teamed, he dominated at the point of attack affecting both the running and the passing game of teams. He was part of the Super Bowl winning teams in 1992, 1993 and 1995.

=== Denver Broncos ===
On March 22, 2001 he signed as a free agent with the Denver Broncos. He played his final season as a reserve player. On February 21, 2002, he was released because of salary cap implications. Lett retired with 22.5 career quarterback sacks, 361 tackles, 128 quarterback pressures, 37 tackles for loss, 26 passes deflected, four blocked kicks and seven fumble recoveries in 121 games.

== Infamous plays ==
Lett was involved in two infamous plays that resulted from gaffes he made. Two of the top three of ESPN's "25 Biggest Sports Blunders" are attributed to Lett and the plays appeared on NFL Network's "Top 10 Foul-Ups" and "Top 10 Worst Plays".

=== Super Bowl XXVII ===
The first play occurred in January 1993, in Super Bowl XXVII. Late in the fourth quarter, Lett recovered a fumble on the Dallas 35-yard line and ran it back towards the end zone. When he reached the 10-yard line, Lett slowed and held the ball out as he approached the goal line. Bills wide receiver Don Beebe chasing him down from behind and knocked the ball out of Lett's outstretched hand just before he crossed the goal line, which sent the ball through the end zone, and resulted in a touchback that cost Lett his touchdown. Lett later said he was watching the Jumbotron, and trying to do a "Michael Irvin", where he put the ball out across the goal line.

The Cowboys had a commanding 52–17 lead at the time, and the play did not have a significant effect on the outcome of the game, but cost the Cowboys the record for most points scored in a Super Bowl, which is currently held by the San Francisco 49ers in Super Bowl XXIV at 55 points. The fumble ranked at #1 in the ESPN fan list, at #2 in the ESPN expert panel, #3 on "Top 10 Foul-Ups", and #9 on "Top 10 Worst Plays".

=== 1993 Thanksgiving Classic ===
The second play occurred during the next season and was more serious as it resulted in a Cowboys defeat. On Thanksgiving Day in 1993, during a rare snow and sleet storm in Dallas, the Cowboys, who came into the game with a 7–3 record, were leading the 8–2 Miami Dolphins by a score of 14–13 with 15 seconds remaining in the game. The Dolphins sent kicker Pete Stoyanovich out to attempt a 41-yard field goal, which would likely have won the game due to how little time remained.

The kick was blocked by Lett's linemate Jimmie Jones, and the ball came to rest several yards away. While most of his teammates began celebrating, Lett attempted to recover the ball. He slipped as he went down, however, and knocked the ball forward. In the resulting chase for possession, the Dolphins recovered in the end zone, but due to muffed kick rules, the ball was awarded to them on the one-yard line.

Had Lett simply done nothing, the Cowboys would have automatically received possession as the play would have been whistled dead and the team would have received possession at the line of scrimmage. Since Lett went for the ball and touched it, by rule the play was considered a muffed kick and the Dolphins were given possession on the one-yard line with three seconds showing on the clock. Stoyanovich attempted a field goal from that spot and connected, winning the game 16–14 for the Dolphins. Lett's failed recovery ranked at #3 in both ESPN lists, #3 on "Top 10 Foul-Ups", and #8 on "Top 10 Worst Plays". The NFL ranked it as the fifth-worst play of all time in 2015.

The most meaningful impact of Lett's miscue, assuming all remaining results were the same, was that it ensured the team's last game of the season had playoff implications. The Cowboys needed a win (or tie) against the New York Giants at Giants Stadium to repeat as NFC East champions (and secure the #1 seed in the NFC), with the loser of that game being assured the #4 seed. Having already beaten the Giants, had Dallas defeated Miami they could have clinched the division title after Week 16 as in that scenario they would have held the tiebreaker against New York even if they had lost in Week 17 to the Giants.

Ultimately, the play did not derail the Cowboys' title defense, as they won all of their remaining games after Thanksgiving and went on to win Super Bowl XXVIII. Conversely, the Dolphins lost the rest of their remaining games and did not qualify for the playoffs. In 2008, the game was named the third-most memorable in the history of Texas Stadium by ESPN.

== Coaching career ==
Lett started his coaching career in 2009 as a volunteer assistant at the University of Nevada, Las Vegas. On May 9, 2009, Lett graduated from UNLV with a degree in university studies and a concentration in sociology and history. On December 19, 2009, he was appointed defensive tackle coach for the University of Louisiana at Monroe.

On March 31, 2011, he was invited as part of the NFL Minority Coaching Fellowship Program to assist Dallas Cowboys defensive line coach Brian Baker during training camp. On July 20, 2011, he was hired as a full-time assistant defensive line coach for the Cowboys.

Lett was among five Cowboys coaches fired at the conclusion of the 2022 season.
