= Tony Tolbert =

American football player (born 1967)

No. 62, 92
- Position: Defensive end

Personal information
- Born: December 29, 1967 (age 58); Tuskegee, Alabama, U.S.
- Listed height: 6 ft 6 in (1.98 m)
- Listed weight: 268 lb (122 kg)

Career information
- High school: Dwight Morrow (Englewood, New Jersey)
- College: UTEP
- NFL draft: 1989: 4th round, 85th overall pick

Career history
- Dallas Cowboys (1989–1997)

Awards and highlights
- 3× Super Bowl champion (XXVII, XXVIII, XXX); Second-team All-Pro (1996); Pro Bowl (1996); NFL All-Rookie team (1989); First-team All-WAC (1988); Second-team All-WAC (1987)

Career NFL statistics
- Sacks: 59
- Forced fumbles: 7
- Fumble recoveries: 4
- Interceptions: 1
- Defensive touchdowns: 1
- Stats at Pro Football Reference

Anthony Lewis Tolbert (born December 29, 1967) is an American former professional football player who was a defensive end for the Dallas Cowboys of the National Football League (NFL). He played college football for the UTEP Miners and was selected in the fourth round of the 1989 NFL draft.

== Early life ==
Tolbert grew up in Englewood, New Jersey, and attended Dwight Morrow High School, where he was an All-conference selection. He accepted a football scholarship from the University of Texas–El Paso.

Tolbert was light for a defensive end (6 feet 2 inches and 175 pounds as a freshman), but developed into a pass rusher.

As a junior, Tolbert was named the starter at outside linebacker, contributing to a 7-4 record, for the program's first winning season since 1970. He posted 49 tackles (five for loss), four sacks, three passes defensed, two forced fumbles and two fumble recoveries. Against Colorado State University, he tallied five tackles and one sack, helping the school win its first football road game in seven years.

During his senior season, Tolbert tied a school record with 11 sacks, while making 101 tackles, 15 tackles for loss (led the team), two passes defensed, one forced fumble and earning All- WAC honors. UTEP's 1988 team is the winningest football team in school history with 10 wins. It also clinched its first bowl bid since 1967, losing 38-18 to University of Southern Mississippi in the Independence Bowl.

In 2014, Tolbert was named to the UTEP football Centennial team. He graduated with a degree in criminal justice.

== Professional career ==
Tolbert was selected by the Dallas Cowboys in the fourth round (85th overall) of the 1989 NFL draft, after falling because he was considered a tweener (slow to play linebacker and light for a defensive end at 230 pounds). As a rookie, Tolbert was converted into a defensive end. He started five games at left defensive end over Ed "Too Tall" Jones, making 52 tackles, two sacks, 18 quarterback pressures, five passes defensed (led the team) and one forced fumble. Tolbert had 10 tackles, one pass defensed and one forced fumble against the Kansas City Chiefs.

In 1990, Tolbert played at both end positions and defensive tackle on passing downs. He started four games, in place of an injured Jim Jeffcoat and Danny Stubbs. He registered 55 tackles, six sacks (third on the team), 24 quarterback pressures (third on the team), three passes defensed and one forced fumble.

In 1991, Tolbert took advantage of a contract holdout by Stubbs and became the regular starter at left defensive end. He posted 73 tackles (fifth on the team), seven sacks (led the team), 25 quarterback pressures (led the team), five passes defensed and two forced fumbles.

In 1996, he was named to the Pro Bowl, when he had a career-high of 12 sacks and 85 tackles.

Tolbert played with chronic knee pain through the final years of his career, because of a degenerative knee condition. Despite playing in pain, Tolbert started all 16 games in 1997, compiled five sacks and led all Cowboys defensive linemen in tackles for the seventh consecutive season, with 60. Tolbert's five sacks were the most on the team that year.

On June 16 1998, Tolbert was released because of his declining performance while playing on aching knees.

As a defensive end for the Cowboys from 1989-1997, Tolbert played an important role in the Cowboys' rise to prominence in the 1990s and their three Super Bowl victories. Tolbert became one of the stalwarts on one of the best defenses of the 1990s. During that time, he teamed up with Charles Haley to become one of the top pass-rushing duos in the NFL. Although Tolbert came into the league as a pass rush specialist, he developed into an effective run stopper, making him the leading tackler among Cowboy defensive linemen for seven straight years.

During Tolbert's career, he recorded 59 quarterback sacks in 128 games played over the course of nine seasons, plus he returned his only interception 54 yards for a touchdown. He had more sacks during the 1990s than any other Cowboy player.

== Personal life ==
Ten years after Tolbert retired, he had knee-replacement surgery on both knees, the result of seven knee surgeries during his nine-year career.
