= Super Bowl XXVIII =

1994 edition of the Super Bowl

Dallas Cowboys (1) (NFC) (12–4)	Buffalo Bills (1) (AFC) (12–4)
30	13
Head coach: Jimmy Johnson	Head coach: Marv Levy
	1	2	3	4	Total
DAL	6	0	14	10	30
BUF	3	10	0	0	13
- Date: January 30, 1994
- Kickoff time: 6:22 p.m. EST (UTC-5)
- Stadium: Georgia Dome; Atlanta, Georgia
- MVP: Emmitt Smith, running back
- Favorite: Cowboys by 10.5
- Referee: Bob McElwee
- Attendance: 72,817

Ceremonies
- National anthem: Natalie Cole
- Coin toss: Joe Namath
- Halftime show: The Judds (featuring Wynonna and Naomi Judd), Clint Black, Travis Tritt, and Tanya Tucker

TV in the United States
- Network: NBC
- Announcers: Dick Enberg, Bob Trumpy, O. J. Simpson, and Will McDonough
- Nielsen ratings: 45.5 (est. 90 million viewers)
- Market share: 66
- Cost of 30-second commercial: $900,000

Radio in the United States
- Network: CBS Radio
- Announcers: Jack Buck and Hank Stram

Super Bowl XXVIII was an American football game between the National Football Conference (NFC) champion Dallas Cowboys and the American Football Conference (AFC) champion Buffalo Bills to decide the National Football League (NFL) champion for the 1993 season. The Cowboys defeated the Bills, for the second straight year, by a score of 30–13, winning their fourth Super Bowl in team history, tying the Pittsburgh Steelers and the San Francisco 49ers for most Super Bowl wins. The Buffalo Bills became the only team to both play and lose four consecutive Super Bowls (XXV, XXVI, XXVII, XXVIII) for a 0–4 franchise Super Bowl record, and as of 2026, remains the team's most recent Super Bowl appearance.

The game was played on January 30, 1994, at the Georgia Dome in Atlanta, Georgia, the first time the state and its capital hosted the Super Bowl. Since the 1993 regular season was conducted over 18 weeks (two byes per team), the traditional bye week between the conference championship games and the Super Bowl was not employed; the last time this had happened was before Super Bowl XXV.

This is the only time that the same two teams have met in consecutive Super Bowls. The defending Super Bowl XXVII champion Cowboys finished with a 12–4 regular season record, despite key players missing games due to injuries. The Bills were making their fourth consecutive Super Bowl appearance, but still seeking their first title, after also finishing with a 12–4 regular season record, largely through the strength of their no-huddle offense.

After trailing 13–6 at halftime, the Cowboys scored 24 unanswered points in the second half. The Bills had built their lead off of running back Thurman Thomas' 4-yard touchdown run. But just 45 seconds into the third quarter, Thomas was stripped of the ball, and Dallas safety James Washington returned the fumble 46 yards for a touchdown to tie the game. From there, Cowboys running back Emmitt Smith, who was named the Super Bowl MVP, largely took over the game. On Dallas' next possession, Smith was handed the ball seven times on an eight-play, 64-yard drive that was capped off with his 15-yard touchdown run. He later scored on a 1-yard touchdown in the fourth quarter. Overall, Smith had 30 carries for 132 yards and 2 touchdowns, while also catching 4 passes for 26 yards.

== Background ==
=== Host selection process ===
NFL owners voted to award Super Bowl XXVIII to Atlanta during their May 23, 1990 meetings in Irving, Texas. It would be Atlanta's first of three Super Bowls (as of 2024) and first of two played at the Georgia Dome. Four cities submitted bids including Atlanta (Georgia Dome), Miami (Joe Robbie Stadium), New Orleans (Superdome), and Tampa (Tampa Stadium). On the first ballot, Tampa was eliminated, mostly due to the fact that they were already scheduled to host XXV. Tampa Bay representative Hugh Culverhouse Jr. immediately threw their support behind the Atlanta bid. Atlanta won on the fourth ballot, with owners rewarding Falcons owner Rankin Smith for his decision to keep the franchise in Atlanta, and for orchestrating the construction of the new stadium. However, the NFL attached conditions to Atlanta's hosting duties. The Georgia Dome was still under construction; the first concrete footings had just been poured that same week. The league gave Atlanta a deadline of September 1 to finalize the construction schedule and budget, otherwise they may consider reassigning the game. In September of that year, Atlanta was selected as the host for the 1996 Summer Olympics, with the Georgia Dome a key venue for the games. Almost immediately, the stadium's luxury boxes began to sell out, helping ensure the stadium would be completed within budget. The stadium was completed on-time for the 1992 season.

=== Dallas Cowboys ===
The Cowboys' journey to Super Bowl XXVIII proved more difficult than the previous season. Pro Bowl running back Emmitt Smith held out the first two regular season games over a contract dispute, and Dallas lost both of those contests, including a 13–10 loss at home to the Bills. Pro Bowl quarterback Troy Aikman, along with a few other key players, missed games due to injuries.

Following the loss to the Bills, Cowboys defensive end Charles Haley was so upset he slammed his helmet through a locker room wall, screaming "We'll never win with a fucking rookie running back, and we have the greatest one ever sitting at home watching TV!" in reference to Smith's replacement, Derrick Lassic. Team owner Jerry Jones apparently agreed, quickly signing Smith to a contract that made him the highest paid running back in the NFL. Jerry Jones, who was in the locker room when the helmet was thrown, said that it missed him by about 2 feet.

With Smith back in the starting lineup and Aikman healthy, Dallas went on to win their next seven games, including a dominating 26–17 win over the San Francisco 49ers and a 23–10 win on the road against the Philadelphia Eagles in which Smith rushed for 237 yards, the 6th highest total in NFL history. Their winning streak was finally snapped against the Atlanta Falcons, with Aikman on the sidelines with an ankle injury, and Smith knocked out of the game after his first carry. They also lost their next game against Miami due to an infamous error by defensive lineman Leon Lett that enabled the Dolphins to kick a game-winning field goal, but then went on to win their remaining five games. In the season finale against the New York Giants, with the Cowboys desperately trying to clinch the NFC East title and a first-round bye in the playoffs, Aikman showed he was at full health, completing 24 of 30 passes with no interceptions, while for Smith it was his career signature game. He suffered a first-degree separation in his right shoulder during the first half, but still finished with 229 total yards (168 yards rushing, 10 passes caught for 61 yards, and the team's only touchdown) in a 16–13 overtime win which enabled Dallas to finish with an NFC-best 12–4 record.

Though not as dynamic as the previous year, Dallas' offense remained incredibly efficient, led by Aikman, who finished the regular season completing 271 out of 392 passes for 3,100 yards, 15 touchdowns, and six interceptions. Despite missing the first two games, Smith recorded 1,486 rushing yards and nine touchdowns, while catching 57 passes for 414 yards and another touchdown, earning him his third consecutive NFL rushing title and the NFL Most Valuable Player Award. Fullback Daryl Johnston was also a reliable backfield threat, scoring four touchdowns and contributing a career-high 50 receptions for 371 yards. Pro Bowler Michael Irvin was once again the team's leading wide receiver, catching 88 passes for 1,330 yards and seven touchdowns. Wide receiver Alvin Harper caught 36 passes for 777 yards and five touchdowns, while Pro Bowl tight end Jay Novacek had 44 receptions for 445 yards and one touchdown. Pro Bowlers Mark Stepnoski, Erik Williams, and Nate Newton anchored the offensive line. On special teams, rookie receiver Kevin Williams ranked seventh in the NFL with 381 yards on 36 punt returns, while also gaining 689 kickoff return yards and catching 20 passes for 151 yards.

The Cowboys' defense was anchored by such Pro Bowlers as lineman Russell Maryland, and Ken Norton Jr., and defensive backs Thomas Everett and Kevin Smith, who intercepted six passes during the season. Defensive end Tony Tolbert led the team with 7.5 sacks, while Charles Haley added 4 and Chad Hennings had 5.5.

=== Buffalo Bills ===
The Bills finished at the top of the AFC by clinching the conference's best regular season record, winning 7 of their first 8 games and finished the season at 12–4. Quarterback Jim Kelly once again led Buffalo's no-huddle offense by passing for 288 out of 470 regular season completions for 3,382 yards, 18 touchdowns, with 18 interceptions. Kelly was joining an elite class by starting his fourth Super Bowl. The only other quarterbacks to start four were Roger Staubach, Terry Bradshaw and Joe Montana, with John Elway, Tom Brady, Peyton Manning, and Patrick Mahomes later doing so. Kelly is the only one to start four consecutive Super Bowl games.

Running back Thurman Thomas led the AFC with 1,315 rushing yards and six touchdowns, while also catching 48 passes for 387 yards. Running back Kenneth Davis rushed for 391 yards and six touchdowns, while also recording 21 receptions for 95 yards. Pro Bowl wide receiver Andre Reed caught 52 receptions for a team-leading 854 yards and six touchdowns; wide receiver Bill Brooks had 60 receptions for 714 yards and five touchdowns; and wide receiver Don Beebe recorded 31 receptions for 504 yards and three touchdowns. Also, tight end Pete Metzelaars led the team with 68 receptions (a higher amount than his last four seasons combined) for 609 yards and four touchdowns. Pro Bowl offensive lineman Howard Ballard anchored the line.

Buffalo's defense was the team's weakness, ranking 27th (second-to-last) in the league, giving up 5,554 total yards. The defense did have a few good contributors, such as Hall of Fame lineman Bruce Smith (14 sacks, one fumble recovery), Pro Bowl linebacker Cornelius Bennett (five sacks, two fumble recoveries), linebacker Darryl Talley (101 tackles, two sacks, two fumble recoveries, three interceptions) and cornerback Nate Odomes, who led the NFL with nine interceptions and one fumble recovery. Linebacker Marvcus Patton, who had moved up to the starting lineup to replace departed Pro Bowler Shane Conlan, was also an impact player, intercepting two passes and recovering three fumbles.

=== Playoffs ===
In the NFC, Dallas' first opponent in the playoffs was the Green Bay Packers, who were coming off a thrilling 28–24 win over the Detroit Lions in the Wild Card Game, in which quarterback Brett Favre had thrown the winning touchdown pass to Sterling Sharpe with only 55 seconds left in the game. In this game, the Packers scored first with a field goal, but Dallas stormed back with 17 consecutive points in the second quarter. First, Aikman threw a 6-yard touchdown pass to Harper. Then with time running out the period, Dallas scored again on an Eddie Murray field goal. Green Bay then fumbled the ensuing kickoff, allowing the Cowboys to score again with Aikman's 6-yard pass to Novacek. The Cowboys went on to stave off an attempted Packers comeback in the second half and win the game, 27–17. Aikman finished the game with 28 of 37 completions for 302 yards and 3 touchdowns, with 2 interceptions. Irvin recorded 9 catches for 126 yards and 2 touchdowns.

One week later, Dallas faced the San Francisco 49ers in the NFC Championship Game for the second year in a row in what was, at the time, the last NFL game to air on CBS. The 49ers had the NFL's highest scoring offense with 473 points, 97 more than the runner-up Cowboys. The last time the two teams played for the NFC title, Dallas won when Aikman thwarted an attempted 49ers comeback with a touchdown drive late in the fourth quarter. But this time, the game was extremely one-sided. The Cowboys scored touchdowns on four of their five first-half possessions. By the end of the half, Dallas had a commanding 28–7 lead. Aikman completed 14 of 18 passes for 177 yards and three touchdowns with no interceptions, while also rushing for 25 yards, but was knocked out of the game with a concussion in the third quarter. Then San Francisco scored a touchdown, making the score 28–14 with plenty of time left for a comeback. However, their hopes were soon dashed as backup quarterback Bernie Kosar, who had already played in three conference championship games and was unable to advance to the Super Bowl each time, led the Cowboys 82 yards to go up 35–14 on his 42-yard touchdown pass to Alvin Harper. Murray then put the finishing touches on San Francisco with a 50-yard field goal, while all the 49ers could do was score a useless touchdown in "garbage time" to make the final score 38–21. Smith rushed for 88 yards, caught seven passes for 85 yards, and scored two touchdowns. Meanwhile, the Dallas defense held 49ers running back Ricky Watters, who rushed for over 100 yards and scored 5 touchdowns in the divisional round, to just 37 yards on 12 carries.

Buffalo's first opponent was the Los Angeles Raiders, led by quarterback Jeff Hostetler, who had led the New York Giants to victory over the Bills in Super Bowl XXV three years earlier. The Raiders had also edged out the Bills 25–24 in week 14 of the regular season. In this game, the Raiders built up a 17–13 halftime lead, but Buffalo stormed back with 16 second half points. First, they scored on Kelly's 25-yard touchdown pass to Brooks. Then on their next drive, kicker Steve Christie kicked a 29-yard field goal to give the Bills a 23–17 lead. Los Angeles managed to respond with an 86-yard scoring strike from Hostetler to receiver Tim Brown, but Buffalo stormed right back with Brooks' 22-yard touchdown reception in the fourth quarter. The Bills ended up winning the game 29–23, having scored 16 points in a span of 6:18 in the second half. Kelly threw for 287 yards and two touchdowns with no interceptions.

One week later, the Bills took on the Kansas City Chiefs for the AFC title. Led by 4-time Super Bowl winning quarterback Joe Montana, Kansas City had defeated the Bills 23-7 during the regular season, and were coming off thrilling narrow wins against the Pittsburgh Steelers and Houston Oilers in the playoffs. In the days leading up to the game, many sports writers and fans were eager for the possibility of a Super Bowl in which Montana took on the San Francisco 49ers led by Steve Young, who had replaced Montana as their starting quarterback, or the Dallas Cowboys, who had displaced the 49ers to become the most dominant team in the NFC. However, Buffalo quickly crushed this prospect, burying Kansas City with a dominating 30–13 victory in the AFC Championship Game. Thomas rushed for 186 yards and three touchdowns, and caught two passes for 22 yards. On defense, the Bills limited Montana to just 9 of 23 completions for 125 yards and no touchdowns, with one interception. In addition, Kansas City's future Hall of Fame running back, Marcus Allen, was held to just 50 rushing yards on 18 carries.

Both Dallas and Buffalo were the top seeded teams in their respective conferences, earning home field advantage throughout the playoffs. Until the New Orleans Saints and Indianapolis Colts qualified for Super Bowl XLIV, this was the last time that both number one seeds advanced to the Super Bowl.

=== Pregame news ===
Many sportswriters and fans were a bit upset that the Bills advanced to their fourth consecutive Super Bowl. They were distressed with Buffalo having lost the three previous Super Bowl games and did not want to see them lose again. Some Bills fans appeared to be defensive about their team's presence in the game; during Buffalo's victory in the AFC Championship Game a week earlier, one fan displayed a banner defiantly proclaiming, "We're back; deal with it, America!"

Therefore, the Super Bowl hype was more focused onto Cowboys owner/general manager Jerry Jones and head coach Jimmy Johnson. Although the two rebuilt the team with young talent that eventually won the previous year's Super Bowl, both men had huge egos that conflicted with each other. Both had different ideas on the future personnel plans for the Cowboys, and both wanted equal credit for the team's recent success. The dispute became so ugly that Super Bowl XXVIII became Johnson's final game coaching the Cowboys after his feud with Jones boiled over. Johnson would join Vince Lombardi, Bill Walsh, and Bill Parcells on the short list of coaches who won a Super Bowl in what turned out to be their last games with the winning franchise; like Lombardi and Parcells but unlike Walsh, Johnson would later return to coach another team, helming the Miami Dolphins between 1996 and 1999 before retiring from coaching for good.

This was the fourth rematch in Super Bowl history, and the first time that both teams met in consecutive years. Both the Bills, as the designated home team in the AFC/NFC annual rotation, and the Cowboys wore the same uniforms as the previous year, with the Bills donning the home blue jersey/white pants set and the Cowboys wearing the white jersey/silver pants set.

Before the game, the Super Bowl became the target of protests over the Georgia state flag, which at the time included the Confederate battle flag and was seen as offensive by the African-American community. Several high-profile Georgia politicians got involved, including state senator Ralph D. Abernathy. The NFL tried to duck the issue, with spokesman Greg Aiello stating, "We're not a political-advocacy group. It's not our role to get involved in political issues that have nothing to do with the Super Bowl." However, the NFL had cancelled plans to hold the Super Bowl in Phoenix three years earlier after a referendum to make Martin Luther King Jr. Day an Arizona state holiday was defeated. Ultimately, the flag was not flown inside the Georgia Dome, but was mounted on a pole outside the stadium.

Vice President Al Gore attended the game.

== Broadcasting ==
The game was broadcast in the United States by NBC, with play-by-play announcer Dick Enberg and color commentator Bob Trumpy. Jim Lampley hosted all the events with the help of analysts Mike Ditka and Joe Gibbs and sideline reporters O. J. Simpson (on Buffalo's sideline) and Will McDonough (on Dallas' sideline). While Lampley was busy covering the trophy presentation, Bob Costas (who also interviewed Dallas head coach Jimmy Johnson and Dallas owner/general manager Jerry Jones together prior to the game) covered for Lampley at the host and analysts' desk (and signed off the broadcast for NBC). NBC also introduced a new NFL theme music by composer John Colby that would be retained for the 1994 season. This would be Simpson's last NFL on NBC appearance before being charged with murder later in Summer 1994.

This remains the only time a single network had held consecutive Super Bowls outright. The league normally alternated the Super Bowl broadcast among its television networks, except for Super Bowl I in which both NBC and CBS televised it simultaneously. The five-year NFL contract signed in 1989 had a provision where the last Super Bowl in the contract (XXVIII) would not be rotated, but would go to the highest bidder. NBC, which had held XXVII (according to the original rotation, NBC would have had XXVI and CBS XXVII, but the NFL allowed the networks to switch the two games in order to allow CBS a significant lead-in to its coverage of the 1992 Winter Olympics), was the only network to bid on XXVIII.

NBC's Super Bowl lead-out programs were the fifth episode of The Good Life and the seventeenth episode of The John Larroquette Show.

== Entertainment ==
=== Pregame ceremonies ===
The pregame show held before the game was titled "Georgia Music Makers" and featured performances by the rap music duo Kris Kross, the rock band The Georgia Satellites, country musician Charlie Daniels, and the Morehouse College Marching Band.

The United States Trampoline Association (USTA) performed on 4 trampolines during "Jump" performed by Kris Kross.

Later, singer Natalie Cole, accompanied by the Atlanta University Center Chorus, sang the national anthem with elements of America the Beautiful.

To honor the 25th anniversary of the New York Jets' upset win in Super Bowl III, that game's MVP, former Jets quarterback Joe Namath joined the coin toss ceremony.

=== Halftime show ===
The halftime show was titled "Rockin' Country Sunday" and featured country music stars Clint Black, Tanya Tucker, Travis Tritt, and Wynonna Judd. The show's finale included a special appearance by Wynonna's mother Naomi Judd, who joined her in performing The Judds' single "Love Can Build a Bridge", to which everyone eventually joined in, along with special guests, Stevie Wonder, Clint's wife Lisa Hartman Black, The Georgia Satellites, Naomi's daughter and Wynonna's half-sister Ashley Judd, Joe Namath, Elijah Wood and Charlie Daniels.

This was the first Super Bowl halftime show in which the main stadium lights were turned off for the performance. The show included dancers with yard-long light sticks.

== Game summary ==
Though the Bills had a lead at halftime, Super Bowl XXVIII would have an identical outcome to the three preceding Super Bowls and end with a Buffalo loss.

=== First quarter ===
Dallas wide receiver Kevin Williams returned the opening kickoff 50 yards to the Buffalo 48-yard line. The Cowboys began the drive with quarterback Troy Aikman's 20-yard pass to wide receiver Michael Irvin. But the Cowboys could only pick up 4 yards on their next three plays, forcing them to settle for kicker Eddie Murray's 41-yard field goal, giving them an early 3–0 lead.

The Bills then responded with an 8-play, 43-yard scoring drive. Quarterback Jim Kelly's two passes to wide receiver Andre Reed and running back Thurman Thomas for 11 and 24 yards, respectively, advanced the ball across the Dallas 40-yard line. After a 3-yard run by running back Kenneth Davis, however, Kelly threw two straight incompletions. The Bills then tied the game, 3–3, with kicker Steve Christie's 54-yard field goal, the then-longest field goal in Super Bowl history. Christie's record stood for 30 years, until it was broken in Super Bowl LVIII by San Francisco 49ers kicker Jake Moody's 55-yard field goal, which was subsequently broken by Kansas City Chiefs kicker Harrison Butker's 57-yard field goal in the same Super Bowl.

Buffalo then forced Dallas to punt, but on the first play of the Bills' ensuing possession, Cowboys safety James Washington stripped the ball from Thomas, and safety Darren Woodson recovered the fumble at midfield. Aided by wide receiver Alvin Harper's 24-yard reception, the Cowboys drove to the Buffalo 7-yard line, but had to settle for Murray's 24-yard field goal to regain the lead, 6–3.

After receiving Murray's kickoff, the Bills could only reach their own 41-yard line before being forced to punt. However, they were given a new set of downs when Cowboys cornerback Dave Thomas was flagged for running into punter Chris Mohr on the play.

=== Second quarter ===
Taking advantage of their second chance, the Bills extended their drive to 80 yards in 17 plays, which featured three short passes from Kelly to wide receiver Don Beebe for 22 yards and six runs by Thomas for 18 yards, the last one being a 4-yard touchdown run, giving the Bills their first lead of the game, 10–6, early in the second quarter.

Dallas started out their ensuing drive with a 15-yard reception by Irvin and a 13-yard run by running back Emmitt Smith to reach midfield. They were eventually forced to punt, but Cowboys linebacker Matt Vanderbeek downed John Jett's 43-yard punt at the Bills' 1-yard line. A 19-yard completion from Kelly to Reed moved Buffalo out from the shadow of their own end zone, and they eventually reached the Cowboys 46-yard line, but they too were forced to punt. However, Mohr matched Jett's feat with a 45-yard punt that was downed at the Dallas 1-yard line by Buffalo wide receiver Steve Tasker.

As the Bills had done, the Cowboys managed to get out of their own territory and advance to the Buffalo 37-yard line. However, Bills cornerback Nate Odomes intercepted a pass intended for Irvin, and returned it 41 yards to the Dallas 47-yard line with 1:03 left in the half. Kelly completed a pair of passes to Thomas and Reed for gains of 12 and 22 yards, respectively, to move the ball to the Dallas 12-yard line. But the Cowboys defense tightened up on the next three plays, so Christie kicked a 28-yard field goal to increase Buffalo's lead to 13–6 and end the half.

=== Third quarter ===
Buffalo's command over the game proved short-lived, as they began to face a red-hot Dallas defense in the second half. Three plays into the third quarter, defensive tackle Leon Lett forced a fumble on Thomas, and Washington returned the ball 46 yards for a touchdown to tie the game, 13–13.

Bills wide receiver Russell Copeland then returned the ensuing kickoff 22 yards to the Buffalo 37-yard line, but on third down, Cowboys defensive ends Jim Jeffcoat and Charles Haley shared a 13-yard sack on Kelly to force the Bills to punt. The Cowboys then scored on an 8-play, 64-yard drive in which Smith carried the ball on seven of the eight plays, gaining all but 3 of the 64 yards himself, and finished the drive with a 15-yard touchdown run (his longest run of the game) to give Dallas a 20–13 lead. Both teams then exchanged punts twice before the quarter ended.

=== Fourth quarter ===
The Dallas defense continued to stop the Buffalo offense throughout the second half. Washington intercepted a pass from Kelly on the first play of the fourth quarter and returned it 12 yards to the Bills' 34-yard line. A false start penalty on offensive tackle Erik Williams on the next play moved the ball back to the 39, but on the next three plays, Smith ran twice for 10 yards and caught a screen pass for 9. Aikman then completed a 16-yard pass to Harper on 3rd-and-8, setting up 1st-and-goal at the Bills' 6-yard line. Buffalo managed to keep Dallas out of the end zone on the next three plays, but on 4th-and-goal, Smith scored his second touchdown of the game on a 1-yard run, increasing the lead to 27–13.

The Bills started their ensuing drive from their own 22-yard line and managed to reach their own 36. Cowboys defensive tackle Jimmie Jones made two key plays, however; a second-down tackle on Thomas for a 1-yard loss and a 13-yard sack on Kelly on third down to push the ball back to the 22-yard line and force Buffalo to punt, leading to a poor, 29-yard kick by Mohr, which the Cowboys recovered at their own 49-yard line. Dallas then cemented their second consecutive Super Bowl title with a 9-play, 49-yard scoring drive that took 4:10 off the clock. On the sixth play of the drive, Aikman completed a 35-yard pass to Harper to the Bills 1-yard line. After a false start penalty against center Frank Cornish pushed them back to the 6-yard line, the Cowboys ran the ball on their next three plays to force the Bills to use up all of their timeouts. Murray then kicked a 20-yard field goal with 2:50 left in the game, capping off the scoring at 30–13. Buffalo then reached the Dallas 22-yard line on their final possession, only to turn the ball over on downs in the game's closing seconds.

"This one is the worst," Reed said after the game, referring to the Bills' streak of four consecutive Super Bowl losses. "We should have won. Then they come up with 24 unanswered points. That last fumble was once in a million. These things always happen to the Bills. It rips the heart out of you." "Dallas didn't wear us down in the second half," added Thomas. "I fumbled. I cost us the game." However, center Kent Hull managed to find some consolation. "In the immediate future, we'll be thought of as losers," he said. "But one day down the road, when I'm no longer playing, they'll say, 'Wow, they won four straight AFC championships. They must have been good.'"

For the Cowboys, Troy Aikman completed 19 out of 27 for 207 yards with 1 interception, while Alvin Harper was the team's top receiver with three catches for 75 yards. Emmitt Smith, still suffering the effects of a shoulder injury during the regular-season finale, became just the second player in Super Bowl history to rush for 100 yards in back-to-back Super Bowls (the other being Larry Csonka, who did it in Super Bowls VII and VIII). He also became the fourth player to rush for touchdowns in back-to-back Super Bowls (joining Franco Harris, John Riggins and Thomas). Smith also became the first player to lead the league in rushing yards, win the NFL Most Valuable Player Award, and win Super Bowl MVP all in the same season. He was also the fourth player, after Bart Starr (1966), Terry Bradshaw (1978), and Joe Montana (1989) to win both the NFL MVP and Super Bowl MVP during the same season. Defensively, James Washington, who began as the nickel-back to counter Buffalo's "no-huddle" and frequent use of three wide receivers, had a phenomenal game with his 46-yard fumble return touchdown, an interception, forcing a Thurman Thomas fumble that Darren Woodson recovered, and collecting 11 tackles. Washington had only started in one game for the Cowboys during the season, but finished this one just a few votes short of earning the MVP award.

For the Bills, wide receiver Andre Reed finished the game with 6 receptions for 75 yards to lead Buffalo, with Don Beebe catching 6 passes for 60 yards and returning 2 kickoffs for 63 yards. Thomas was limited to just 37 rushing yards, but he also caught 7 passes for 52 yards (Thomas became the first player in Super Bowl history to score touchdowns in four Super Bowls: he scored one touchdown in each of the Bills' four straight appearances, XXV-XXVIII). Kenneth Davis was the Bills' top rusher with 38 yards. Kelly finished the game completing 31 of 50 passes for 260 yards and 1 interception. His 31 completions was a then-Super Bowl record. Kelly became the only player ever to throw 50 passes in two Super Bowls. In addition to his 50 passes in this game, he threw a Super Bowl-record 58 passes in Super Bowl XXVI.

=== Box score ===
Super Bowl XXVIII: Dallas Cowboys 30, Buffalo Bills 13

Quarter	1	2	3	4	Total
Cowboys (NFC)	6	0	14	10	30
Bills (AFC)	3	10	0	0	13

at Georgia Dome, Atlanta, Georgia

- Date: January 30, 1994
- Game time: 6:22 p.m. EST
- Game weather: 72 °F (22 °C), played indoors, domed stadium

Scoring summary

Quarter	Time	Drive			Team	Scoring information	Score	
Quarter	Time	Plays	Yards	TOP	Team	Scoring information	DAL	BUF
1	12:41	5	24	2:19	DAL	41-yard field goal by Eddie Murray	3	0
1	10:19	8	43	2:22	BUF	54-yard field goal by Steve Christie	3	3
1	3:55	7	43	4:02	DAL	24-yard field goal by Murray	6	3
2	12:26	17	80	6:29	BUF	Thurman Thomas 4-yard touchdown run, Christie kick good	6	10
2	0:00	7	38	1:03	BUF	28-yard field goal by Christie	6	13
3	14:05	—	—	—	DAL	Fumble recovery returned 46 yards for touchdown by James Washington, Murray kick good	13	13
3	8:42	8	64	4:32	DAL	Emmitt Smith 15-yard touchdown run, Murray kick good	20	13
4	9:50	9	34	5:03	DAL	Smith 1-yard touchdown run, Murray kick good	27	13
4	2:50	10	49	4:10	DAL	20-yard field goal by Murray	30	13
"TOP" = time of possession. For other American football terms, see Glossary of American football.							30	13

== Final statistics ==
Sources: NFL.com Super Bowl XXVIII, Super Bowl XXVIII Play Finder Dal, Super Bowl XXVIII Play Finder Buf

=== Statistical comparison ===
	Dallas Cowboys	Buffalo Bills
First downs	20	22
First downs rushing	6	6
First downs passing	14	15
First downs penalty	0	1
Third down efficiency	5/13	5/17
Fourth down efficiency	1/1	2/3
Net yards rushing	137	87
Rushing attempts	35	27
Yards per rush	3.9	3.2
Passing – Completions/attempts	19/27	31/50
Times sacked-total yards	2–3	2–20
Interceptions thrown	1	1
Net yards passing	204	227
Total net yards	341	314
Punt returns-total yards	1–5	1–5
Kickoff returns-total yards	2–72	6–144
Interceptions-total return yards	1–12	1–41
Punts-average yardage	4–43.8	5–37.6
Fumbles-lost	0–0	3–2
Penalties-total yards	6–50	1–10
Time of possession	34:29	25:31
Turnovers	1	3

=== Individual leaders ===
Cowboys passing
	C/ATT^{1}	Yds	TD	INT	Rating
Troy Aikman	19/27	207	0	1	77.2
Cowboys rushing
	Car^{2}	Yds	TD	LG^{3}	Yds/Car
Emmitt Smith	30	132	2	15	4.40
Kevin Williams	1	6	0	6	6.00
Troy Aikman	1	3	0	3	3.00
Daryl Johnston	1	0	0	0	0.00
Bernie Kosar	1	–1	0	–1	–1.00
Lincoln Coleman	1	–3	0	–3	–3.00
Cowboys receiving
	Rec^{4}	Yds	TD	LG^{3}	Target^{5}
Michael Irvin	5	66	0	20	8
Jay Novacek	5	26	0	9	7
Emmitt Smith	4	26	0	10	5
Alvin Harper	3	75	0	35	4
Daryl Johnston	2	14	0	11	2
Kevin Williams	0	0	0	0	1

Bills passing
	C/ATT^{1}	Yds	TD	INT	Rating
Jim Kelly	31/50	260	0	1	67.1
Bills rushing
	Car^{2}	Yds	TD	LG^{3}	Yds/Car
Kenneth Davis	9	38	0	11	4.22
Thurman Thomas	16	37	1	6	2.31
Jim Kelly	2	12	0	8	6.00
Bills receiving
	Rec^{4}	Yds	TD	LG^{3}	Target^{5}
Bill Brooks	7	63	0	15	9
Thurman Thomas	7	52	0	24	7
Andre Reed	6	75	0	22	10
Don Beebe	6	60	0	18	11
Kenneth Davis	3	–5	0	7	5
Pete Metzelaars	1	8	0	8	1
Keith McKeller	1	7	0	7	3
Russell Copeland	0	0	0	0	1

^{1}Completions/attempts ^{2}Carries ^{3}Long gain ^{4}Receptions ^{5}Times targeted

=== Records set ===
The following records were set in Super Bowl XXVIII, according to the official NFL.com boxscore and the ProFootball reference.com game summary.
Some records have to meet NFL minimum number of attempts to be recognized. The minimums are shown (in parentheses).

Player records set
Passing records
Most attempts, career	145	Jim Kelly (Buffalo)
Most completions, game	31	Jim Kelly (Buffalo)
Highest completion percentage, career, (40 attempts)	71.9% (41–57)	Troy Aikman (Dallas)
Other Records
Most receptions, career	27	Andre Reed (Buffalo)
Longest field goal	54 yards	Steve Christie (Buffalo)
Records tied
Most points scored, career	24	Thurman Thomas (Buffalo)
Most touchdowns, career	4	Thurman Thomas (Buffalo)
Most rushing touchdowns, career	4	Thurman Thomas (Buffalo)
Most interceptions thrown, career	7	Jim Kelly (Buffalo)
Most rushing touchdowns, game	2	Emmitt Smith (Dallas)
Most fumbles recovered, career	2	Kenneth Davis (Buffalo)
Most fumble returns for touchdowns, game	1	James Washington (Dallas)

Team records set
Most Super Bowl appearances	7	Cowboys
Most consecutive Super Bowl appearances	4	Bills
Most consecutive Super Bowl losses	4	Bills
Most passes completed	31	Bills
Records tied
Most Super Bowl victories	4	Cowboys
Most consecutive Super Bowl victories	2	Cowboys
Most Super Bowl losses	4	Bills
Fewest points, second half	0 pts	Bills
Fewest passing touchdowns	0	Bills; Cowboys

Records tied, both team totals
	Total	Cowboys	Bills
Most field goals made	5	3	2
Fewest passing touchdowns	0	0	0
Fewest punt returns, game	2	1	1

== Starting lineups ==
Hall of Fame‡

Dallas	Position	Position	Buffalo
Offense
Alvin Harper	WR		Don Beebe
Mark Tuinei	LT		John Fina
Nate Newton	LG		Glenn Parker
John Gesek	C		Kent Hull
Kevin Gogan	RG		John Davis
Erik Williams	RT		Howard Ballard
Jay Novacek	TE		Pete Metzelaars
Michael Irvin‡	WR		Andre Reed‡
Troy Aikman‡	QB		Jim Kelly‡
Emmitt Smith‡	RB		Thurman Thomas‡
Daryl Johnston	FB	WR	Bill Brooks
Defense
Tony Tolbert	LE		Phil Hansen
Tony Casillas	LT	NT	Jeff Wright
Leon Lett	RT	RE	Bruce Smith‡
Charles Haley‡	RE	LOLB	Marvcus Patton
Robert Jones	MLB	LILB	Cornelius Bennett
Darrin Smith	RLB	RILB	Mark Maddox
Darren Woodson	DB	ROLB	Darryl Talley
Kevin Smith	LCB		Mickey Washington
Larry Brown	RCB		Nate Odomes
Thomas Everett	SS		Henry Jones
James Washington	FS		Mark Kelso

== Officials ==
- Referee: Bob McElwee #95 second Super Bowl (XXII)
- Umpire: Art Demmas #78 third Super Bowl (XIII, XVII)
- Head linesman: Sid Semon #109 second Super Bowl (XXV)
- Line judge: Tom Barnes #55 first Super Bowl
- Back judge: Al Jury #106 fourth Super Bowl (XX, XXII, XXIV)
- Side judge: Nate Jones #97 first Super Bowl
- Field judge: Don Orr #77 third Super Bowl (XVII, XXIV)
- Alternate referee: Jerry Markbreit #9 (referee for XVII, XXI, XXVI)
- Alternate umpire: Bob Boylston #101 (umpire for XVI, XXI, XXVI)
