= Michael Irvin =

American football player, actor, and sports commentator (born 1966)

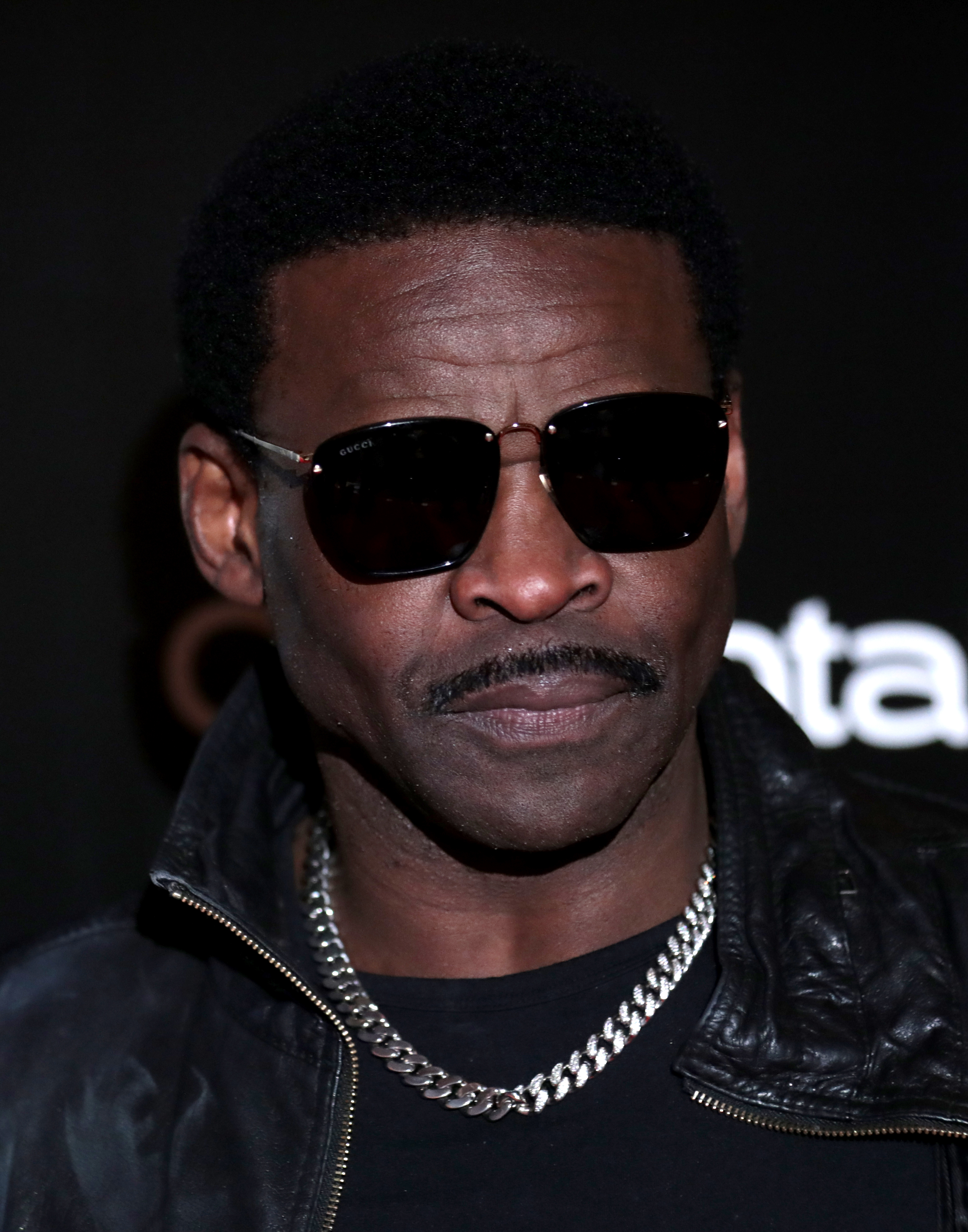
- Irvin in 2023

No. 88
- Position: Wide receiver

Personal information
- Born: March 5, 1966 (age 60); Fort Lauderdale, Florida, U.S.
- Listed height: 6 ft 2 in (1.88 m)
- Listed weight: 207 lb (94 kg)

Career information
- High school: Piper (Sunrise, Florida); St. Thomas Aquinas (Fort Lauderdale)
- College: Miami (FL) (1984–1987)
- NFL draft: 1988: 1st round, 11th overall pick

Career history
- Dallas Cowboys (1988–1999)

Awards and highlights
- 3× Super Bowl champion (XXVII, XXVIII, XXX); First-team All-Pro (1991); 2× Second-team All-Pro (1992, 1993); 5× Pro Bowl (1991–1995); NFL receiving yards leader (1991); NFL 1990s All-Decade Team; Dallas Cowboys Ring of Honor; National champion (1987); First-team All-American (1986); 2× Second-team All-American (1985, 1987)

Career NFL statistics
- Receptions: 750
- Receiving yards: 11,904
- Receiving touchdowns: 65
- Stats at Pro Football Reference
- Pro Football Hall of Fame

Michael Jerome Irvin (born March 5, 1966) is an American sports commentator and former professional football player. He played as a wide receiver for 12 seasons with the Dallas Cowboys of the National Football League (NFL). He was inducted into the Pro Football Hall of Fame in 2007.

Irvin played college football for the Miami Hurricanes and was selected in the first round of the 1988 NFL draft by the Cowboys. He played for the Cowboys from 1988 to 1999 before sustaining a cervical fracture of his spine in a game against the Philadelphia Eagles, in which he was carted off the field and transported to a Philadelphia hospital, forcing him to retire.

Irvin was nicknamed "the Playmaker" due to his penchant for making big plays in big games during his college and pro careers. Along with Troy Aikman and Emmitt Smith, Irvin was one of three key Cowboys offensive players known as "The Triplets", who led the Cowboys to three Super Bowl wins in 1992, 1993, and 1995.

Irvin is a former broadcaster for ESPN's Sunday NFL Countdown and currently an analyst for NFL Network. In 2009, he competed in Season 9 of Dancing with the Stars and was the season's ninth contestant to be eliminated. He was one of the co-hosts of the FS1 weekday debate show Speak with Paul Pierce, Keyshawn Johnson, and Joy Taylor.

== Early life ==
Irvin was born March 5, 1966, in Fort Lauderdale, Florida. He is the 15th of 17 children in his family. Irvin first attended Piper High School in Sunrise, Florida, and then went on to become a football star at St. Thomas Aquinas High School in Fort Lauderdale.

While at St. Thomas Aquinas High School, Irvin was heavily recruited by the University of Miami to play for the Miami Hurricanes.

== College career ==
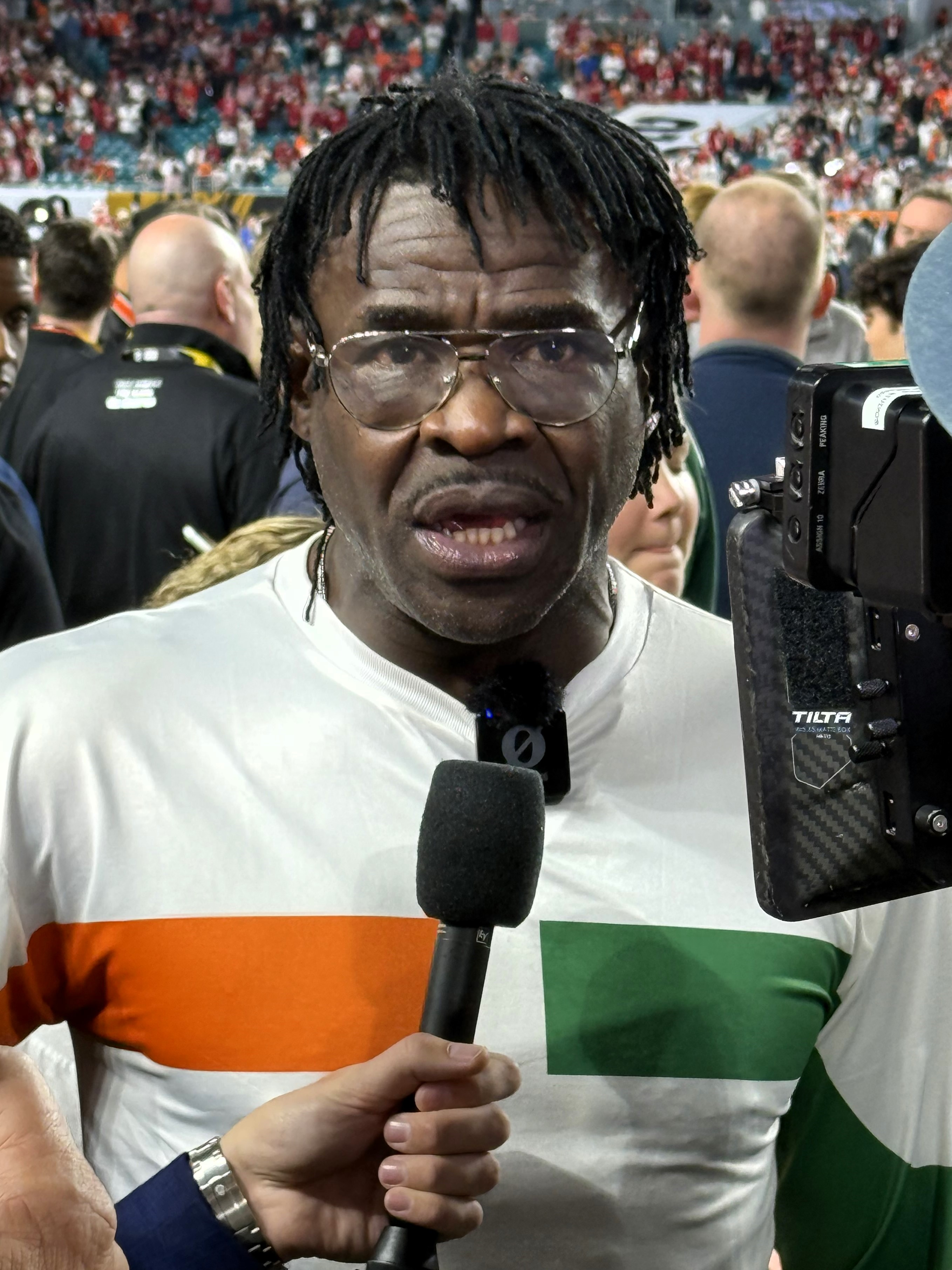
Irvin was a highly visible booster of the Miami Hurricanes football team during the 2025-26 season, here talking on the sideline before their appearance in the 2026 CFP national championship

At the University of Miami under coach Jimmy Johnson, Irvin set school records for the Miami Hurricanes for career receptions (143), receiving yards (2,423 and later broken by Santana Moss), and touchdown receptions (26). He was a member of the University of Miami's 1987 national championship team and made one of the most legendary plays in school history that year, scoring on a 73-yard fourth-quarter touchdown pass from Steve Walsh that provided the margin of victory in Miami's victory over archrival Florida State, which propelled them into the national championship game, the 1988 Orange Bowl, against the top-ranked Oklahoma Sooners.

Irvin was selected three times as an All-American by the Newspaper Enterprise Association, earning second-team honors as a freshman, first-team as a sophomore, and second-team again as a junior.

In 1988, following his junior year at the University of Miami, Irvin announced he was skipping his final year of college eligibility and declaring his eligibility for the 1988 NFL draft.

== Professional career ==
Irvin was selected by the Dallas Cowboys as the 11th pick in the first round of the 1988 NFL draft. He was the last first-round draft pick made by the Cowboys under the leadership of long-time general manager Tex Schramm, player personnel director Gil Brandt, and head coach Tom Landry. Schramm predicted that Irvin would accelerate the Cowboys' "return to the living".

=== 1988 season ===
As a rookie in the 1988 season, Irvin became the first rookie receiver in Cowboys' history to start a season opener in 20 years. In the opening game of his rookie season against the Pittsburgh Steelers at Three Rivers Stadium on September 3, 1988, Irvin caught his first NFL career touchdown. He also caught three touchdown passes in the Cowboys' win over the Washington Redskins on December 11, 1988, at RFK Stadium, which represented one of only three wins in the Cowboys' 3–13 1988 season, which was the final season of Landry's career. For the season, Irvin led the NFC in average yards per catch with a 20.4 yard average per catch.

=== 1989 and 1990 seasons ===
In 1989, the Cowboys hired Jimmy Johnson, Irvin's coach at the University of Miami, to replace Landry. The Cowboys' misfortunes continued in 1989, and they finished the season with a 1–15 record, the worst season record in Cowboys franchise history. Injuries limited Irvin to only six games during the season. He had been on pace to gain over 1,000 receiving yards until tearing his anterior cruciate ligament in his right knee in a game against the San Francisco 49ers on October 15, 1989, after which he was placed on the injured reserve list for the rest of the 1989 season and the first three games of the 1990 season.

In 1990, Irvin did not register his first reception until the seventh game and finished the season with just 20 receptions for 413 yards, but also averaged 20.7 yards per catch.

Before the injury, Irvin was almost traded to the Los Angeles Raiders to help bring talent to the Cowboys and potentially pair him up with Tim Brown, but Raiders owner Al Davis essentially talked Johnson out of the trade by saying, "You sure you want to do that? Who is going to catch passes for you?" Johnson instead traded Herschel Walker to the Minnesota Vikings in what would come to be known as the Herschel Walker trade. One factor in Irvin almost being traded was that then-offensive coordinator David Shula thought Irvin was slow and not a team player. When the Cowboys fired Shula and replaced him with Norv Turner, the notion of trading Irvin became nonexistent in part because Turner believed Irvin would become a superstar in his system.

=== 1991 season ===
In 1991, Irvin was a major factor in the Cowboys reaching the playoffs. He finished the season with 93 receptions (second in the NFL for the season), 1,523 receiving yards (first in the NFL for the season), eight receiving touchdowns, and set a Cowboys franchise record with seven 100-yard games. Irvin was named to the 1991 Pro Bowl, the first of five consecutive seasons in which he was selected to Pro Bowls.

=== 1992 and 1993 seasons ===
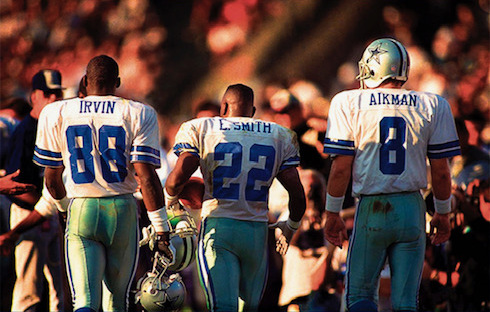
The trio of Troy Aikman, Emmitt Smith, and Irvin nicknamed "The Triplets" won three Super Bowls and is considered one of the greatest in NFL history.

In 1992 and 1993, Irvin was a key player on the Cowboys' Super Bowl teams. In 1994, he enjoyed another stellar campaign with his fourth consecutive Pro Bowl season, but that year the Cowboys lost to the San Francisco 49ers in the NFC Championship Game. For his part, however, Irvin had one of the most productive games in NFL playoff history, with 12 catches for an NFC championship record 192 yards and two touchdowns.

One of his greatest performances was in Super Bowl XXVII (1993), where he caught six passes for 114 yards and two touchdowns against the Buffalo Bills. His two touchdowns were scored in the second quarter and occurred in a span of just 18 seconds, the fastest pair of touchdowns ever scored by one player in Super Bowl history. He also became only the second player ever to score 2 touchdowns in one quarter of a Super Bowl, after Washington Redskins wide receiver Ricky Sanders in Super Bowl XXII.

=== 1995 season ===
Irvin's best season with the Cowboys was 1995 during which he set franchise records for receptions (111) and receiving yards (1,603) while scoring 10 touchdowns and setting an NFL record with 11 games with over 100 receiving yards. Irvin had seven receptions for 100 yards and two touchdowns against the Green Bay Packers in the NFC Championship Game, which led the Cowboys to Super Bowl XXX, the team's third Super Bowl win in a span of four seasons. In the Super Bowl against the Pittsburgh Steelers, he had five receptions for 76 yards.

Irvin is the only player to play for each of the first four Cowboys coaches since the team has been owned by Jerry Jones (Landry, Johnson, Barry Switzer, and Chan Gailey). Irvin officially announced his retirement after Dave Campo became the fifth Cowboys coach, but never played on the field for Campo.

=== 1999 season ===
On October 10, 1999, during the fifth game of the 1999 season, Irvin was tackled by Philadelphia Eagles cornerback Bobby Taylor. As he was going down, defensive back Tim Hauck landed on him and drove his head into the turf at Veterans Stadium in Philadelphia. He sustained a non-life-threatening cervical spine injury, but was carted off the field and transported to the Thomas Jefferson University Hospital in Philadelphia. Irvin did not play again that season. Doctors subsequently discovered Irvin had been born with cervical spinal stenosis, and told him that this condition put him at higher risk for injury, including paralysis, if he suffered another blow to the neck or head. After being advised to stop playing football, Irvin announced his retirement in May 2000.

Irvin was the last Tom Landry-coached player to retire from the NFL. Landry died on February 12, 2000, several months after Irvin's injury in Philadelphia but before Irvin had announced that he was retiring due to the severity of that injury.

== Legacy ==
At 6'2" and 207 pounds, Irvin was a big, physical receiver who manhandled cornerbacks and often was able to make tough catches in defensive traffic. In part because of Irvin's ability to push off the defender with such ease, the NFL eventually changed its rules to adjust to wide receivers who emulated Irvin's physical style.

Irvin was a vocal, emotional leader who set every significant career receiving mark in Cowboys history, including catches and receiving yards. At the time of his retirement, he owned or was tied for 20 team receiving records. In November 2008, his Cowboys teammate Daryl Johnston said, "Michael was the hardest working guy on our team. He was a guy who made some wrong decisions, but he never took anything public, and he never spoke out against anyone on our team. He wasn't a problem. He was more of an inspiration."

Irvin has high regard for players from "The U", as he likes to call the University of Miami, including Frank Gore, Edgerrin James, and others.

== Career statistics ==
=== NFL ===
Legend
	Won the Super Bowl
	Led the league
**Bold**	Career high

Year	Team	Games		Receiving					Rushing				
Year	Team	GP	GS	Rec	Yds	Avg	Lng	TD	Att	Yds	Avg	Lng	TD
1988	DAL	14	10	32	654	20.4	61	5	1	2	2.0	2	0
1989	DAL	6	6	26	378	14.5	65	2	1	**6**	**6.0**	6	0
1990	DAL	12	7	20	413	**20.7**	61	5	0	0	0.0	0	0
1991	DAL	16	16	93	1,523	16.4	66	8	0	0	0.0	0	0
1992	DAL	16	14	78	1,396	17.9	**87**	7	1	-9	-9.0	-9	0
1993	DAL	16	16	88	1,330	15.1	61	7	**2**	**6**	3.0	**9**	0
1994	DAL	16	16	79	1,241	15.7	65	6	0	0	0.0	0	0
1995	DAL	16	16	**111**	**1,603**	14.4	50	**10**	0	0	0.0	0	0
1996	DAL	11	11	64	962	15.0	61	2	0	0	0.0	0	0
1997	DAL	16	16	75	1,180	15.7	55	9	0	0	0.0	0	0
1998	DAL	16	15	74	1,057	14.3	51	1	1	1	1.0	1	0
1999	DAL	4	4	10	167	16.7	37	3	0	0	0.0	0	0
Career		159	147	750	11,904	15.9	87	65	6	6	1.0	9	0

=== College ===
- 1985: 46 catches for 840 yards and 9 TD.
- 1986: 53 catches for 868 yards and 11 TD.
- 1987: 44 catches for 715 yards and 6 TD. 2 carries for 4 yards.

== Records and honors ==
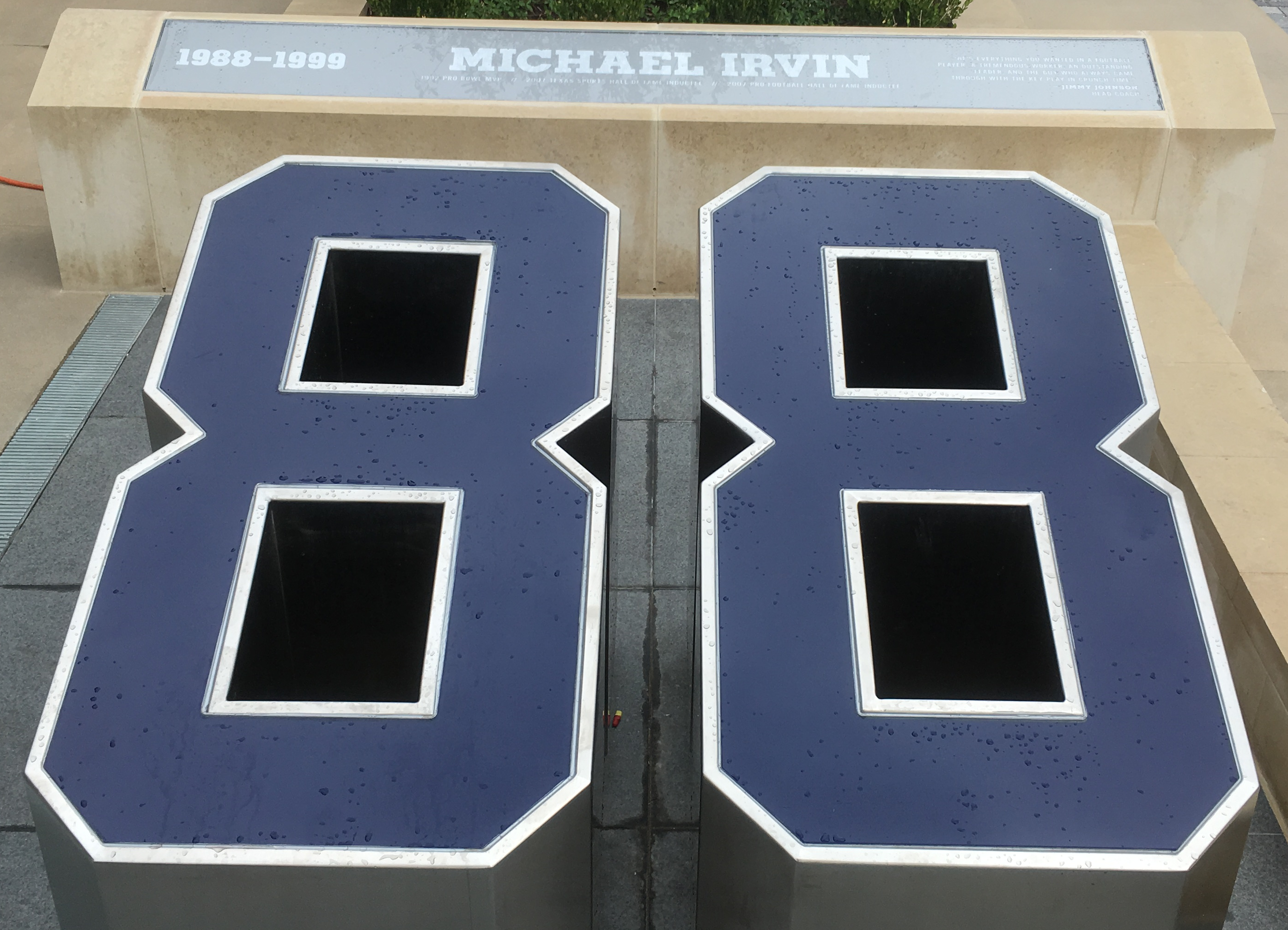
Irvin's Dallas Cowboys number 88 displayed outside at the team's facilities

=== University of Miami Sports Hall of Fame ===
In 2000, Irvin was inducted into the University of Miami Sports Hall of Fame.

=== NFL records ===
Irvin finished his career with 750 receptions (tied with Charlie Joiner for 30th all-time in the NFL) for 11,904 yards (21st all-time in the NFL) and 65 touchdowns. His 47 100-yard receiving games is eighth-most in NFL history, tied with Torry Holt. Irvin was selected to five Pro Bowls (two more than any other wide receiver in franchise history) and was named the MVP of the 1992 Pro Bowl (following the 1991 season) after catching eight passes for 125 yards and a touchdown in the NFC's 21–15 triumph. Irvin was a key playmaker for the Dallas Cowboys that won 6 division titles and three Super Bowls.

As part of Dallas' starting lineup on offense, Irvin was a consistent force to be reckoned with in the regular season but also excelled in the playoffs, where his six career 100-yard receiving games are just two shy of the NFL record held by Jerry Rice, who had eight such games. Irvin's 87 postseason receptions place him second in NFL playoff history behind Rice, who had 151, and Irvin's 1,315 post-season receiving yards ranks second to Rice, who recorded 2,245 post-season yards.

From 1991 through 1998, Irvin recorded 1,000-yard seasons in all but one year, racking up an impressive 10,292 yards over an eight-year span. Along the way, the Cowboys made four straight appearances in the NFC Championship Game (1992–1995) and captured three Super Bowl championships with back-to-back wins over the Buffalo Bills in Super Bowl XXVII and Super Bowl XXVIII, and the Pittsburgh Steelers in Super Bowl XXX.

=== Dallas Cowboys Ring of Honor ===
Along with his former teammates Troy Aikman and Emmitt Smith, Irvin was inducted into the Dallas Cowboys Ring of Honor on September 19, 2005.

=== Texas Sports Hall of Fame ===
Irvin was one of three former NFL players with Cowboys ties selected for induction into the 2007 class of the Texas Sports Hall of Fame, all of whom were inducted at a February 2008 ceremony in Waco, Texas. The other two were Jim Ray Smith of the Cleveland Browns, who finished his career with the Cowboys (1963–64), and Ray Childress, a five-time Pro Bowl defensive end for the Houston Oilers who wrapped up his NFL career with the Cowboys in 1996.

=== Florida All-Century Team ===
In 2007, Irvin was named to the Florida High School Athletic Association's All-Century Team that listed the Top 33 football players in the state of Florida's 100-year history of high school football.

=== Pro Football Hall of Fame ===
Irvin became eligible for induction to the Pro Football Hall of Fame in 2005. He was selected in his third year of eligibility, on February 3, 2007, alongside Gene Hickerson, Bruce Matthews, Thurman Thomas, Charlie Sanders, and Roger Wehrli. He was formally inducted into the Pro Football Hall of Fame during the Hall of Fame's August 4, 2007, induction ceremony in Canton, Ohio. Irvin delivered a tearful acceptance speech in which he referenced both his life as a football player and the many mistakes he has made in his life. His speech has been praised by many NFL commentators as heartfelt, including those who had been inclined to dislike him.

On October 14, 2007, Irvin accepted his Hall of Fame ring at Texas Stadium during halftime of the Cowboys–New England Patriots game. In his speech, he proposed to Commissioner Roger Goodell that all drafted rookies will have a tour of the Pro Football Hall of Fame to better understand their football history.

== Personal life ==
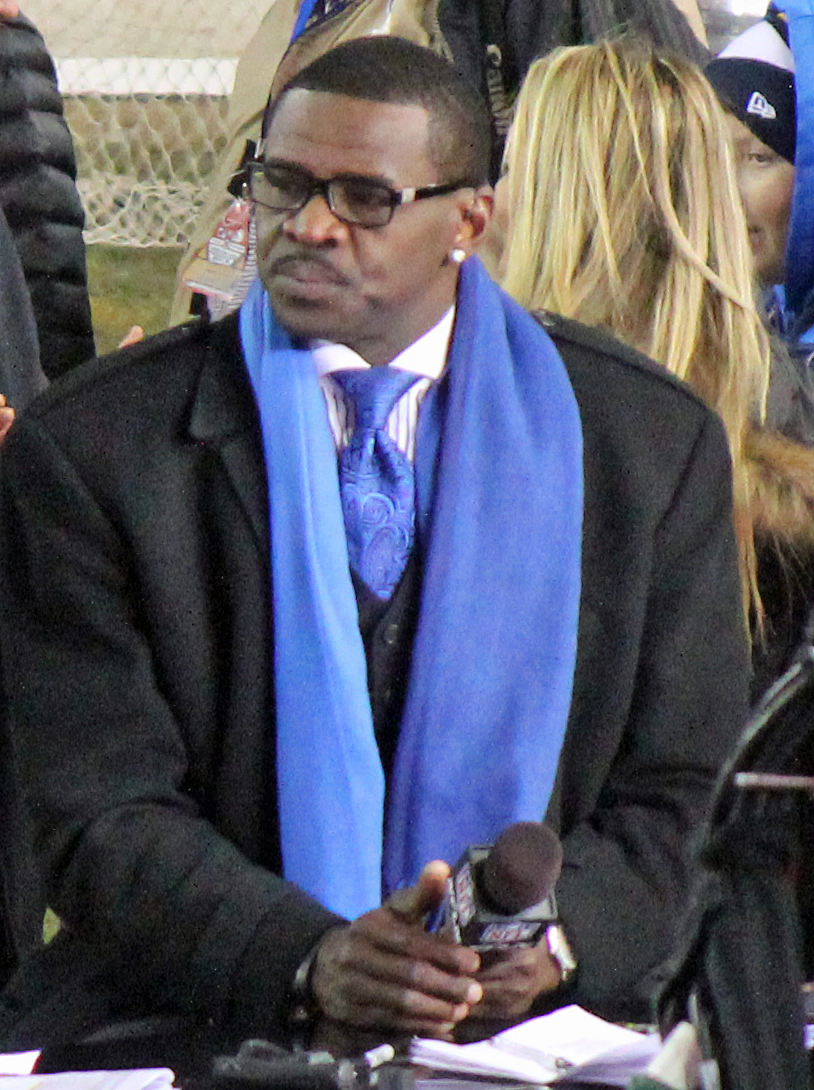
Irvin in 2013

Irvin has been married to Sandy Harrell since 1990. They have a daughter and two sons together. Irvin also has another daughter from a previous relationship.

Irvin is a Christian. He has said, "I turned my life over to Christ in early 2001 with help from Pastor T. D. Jakes and my friend and fellow believer, Deion Sanders. It took me forty years to really realize the hand that God had on me. I did almost every bad thing you could do, but it's through the power of God I can live this life."

== Allegations ==
=== Sexual assault allegation against Irvin ===
In 1996, as the Cowboys prepared to play the Carolina Panthers in the NFC Divisional Playoff game, media reports stated that Irvin and his teammate Erik Williams, while under the influence of cocaine, had sexually assaulted Dallas cheerleader Nina Shahravan and videotaped the interaction while pointing a gun at her head.

Despite Williams' and Irvin's denials of the allegations, the story largely overshadowed the game, which the Cowboys lost. The accuser was later proven to have fabricated the entire incident. She recanted her story, pled guilty to perjury and filing a false police report, and was sentenced to 90 days in jail and a fine. In the game against Carolina, Irvin was injured in the opening minutes and did not return.

=== 1998 scissor attack ===
On July 29, 1998, Irvin assaulted Cowboys offensive lineman Everett McIver. The initial dispute stemmed from Irvin demanding that McIver vacate a barber's chair so that Irvin would not have to wait for a haircut. McIver and Irvin soon began a brawl in the shop with fellow Cowboy Leon Lett attempting to break it up.

During the course of the dispute, Irvin grabbed a pair of scissors and stabbed McIver in the neck, barely missing his carotid artery. Cowboys owner Jerry Jones reportedly brokered a six-figure settlement between Irvin and McIver in exchange for McIver's silence and to prevent McIver from pursuing criminal charges against Irvin.

=== Arrests ===
In June 2001, a year following his NFL retirement, Irvin was arrested for felony cocaine possession. Irvin was in a Dallas apartment with an unrelated woman, and neither answered the door when police drug task force agents arrived with a search warrant. Police then entered the apartment forcibly, finding drugs. Irvin and the woman were placed under arrest, though charges against Irvin were later dropped.

On November 25, 2005, Irvin was pulled over in Plano, Texas, for speeding. Irvin was arrested on an outstanding warrant for an unpaid speeding ticket in Irving, Texas, and was also cited for misdemeanor possession of drug paraphernalia after police searched his car and found a pipe and plastic bags with marijuana residue. Irvin was arrested for a Class C misdemeanor, and was later released on bond.

On December 1, 2005, in response to his arrest, ESPN suspended Irvin for the Sunday and Monday night Countdown shows on December 4 and 5, 2005. He returned to both shows with no mention or consequence of the past incident.

=== 2007 sexual assault allegation ===
On July 4, 2007, Irvin was accused of sexual assault while he was at the Seminole Hard Rock Casino in Hollywood, Florida. Charges were never filed, but a civil suit was filed against him in 2010. Irvin filed a $100 million defamation countersuit, which was dropped when the case was settled out of court in January 2011.

=== Victim of alleged 2009 carjacking attempt ===
On January 12, 2009, Irvin claimed he was a victim of a possible carjacking attempt while stopped at a light in Dallas. He filed a police report claiming that two men flashed a gun at him but eventually drove away after commenting that they were Cowboys fans. Dallas police suspended their investigation two weeks later, stating that Irvin did not cooperate in the investigation and that they could not proceed without his cooperation.

=== 2017 sexual assault investigation ===
On March 22, 2017, Fort Lauderdale police investigated Irvin for allegedly sexually assaulting a woman in Florida. Irvin denied the allegations. On July 24, the Broward County State Attorney's Office announced they had closed the investigation and would not charge Irvin in the case.

=== Super Bowl LVII alleged misconduct ===
NFL Network removed Irvin from its coverage of Super Bowl LVII in February 2023 after allegations of sexual misconduct toward a woman at his hotel in the Phoenix area. Though surveillance video showed him interacting with the woman, Irvin told a Dallas-Fort Worth radio station that he had no recollection of any incident because he had been intoxicated. He also denied there was any wrongdoing.

=== Statements ===
In a November 2006 radio interview on Dan Patrick's radio show, Irvin joked that Dallas Cowboys quarterback Tony Romo's athletic ability may have been due to African-American heritage and jokingly remarked that Romo's maternal relatives might have been involved with "slave brothers". Irvin later apologized and said, "this is how I joke around with Romo when we're playing basketball. There's a difference from me the player and me the broadcaster".

On February 17, 2007, during the late edition of SportsCenter, ESPN announced that Irvin was no longer with the network. ESPN Communications Vice President Josh Krulewitz said, "We thank Michael for his contributions to ESPN and wish him well." However, eleven months later, in January 2008, Irvin rejoined ESPN as a host on ESPN Radio owned and operation station KESN (103.3 FM) in Dallas, hosting The Michael Irvin Show. This locally aired program ended on February 5, 2010, and Irvin was let go after his contract expired. An ESPN spokesman cited declining ratings and that news of a lawsuit filed against Irvin for a 2007 incident "simply expedited the situation".

On a February 2017 episode of The Rich Eisen Show, Irvin admitted to having snuck out of the locker room during halftime of Super Bowl XXVII to watch Michael Jackson perform.

== Entertainment career ==
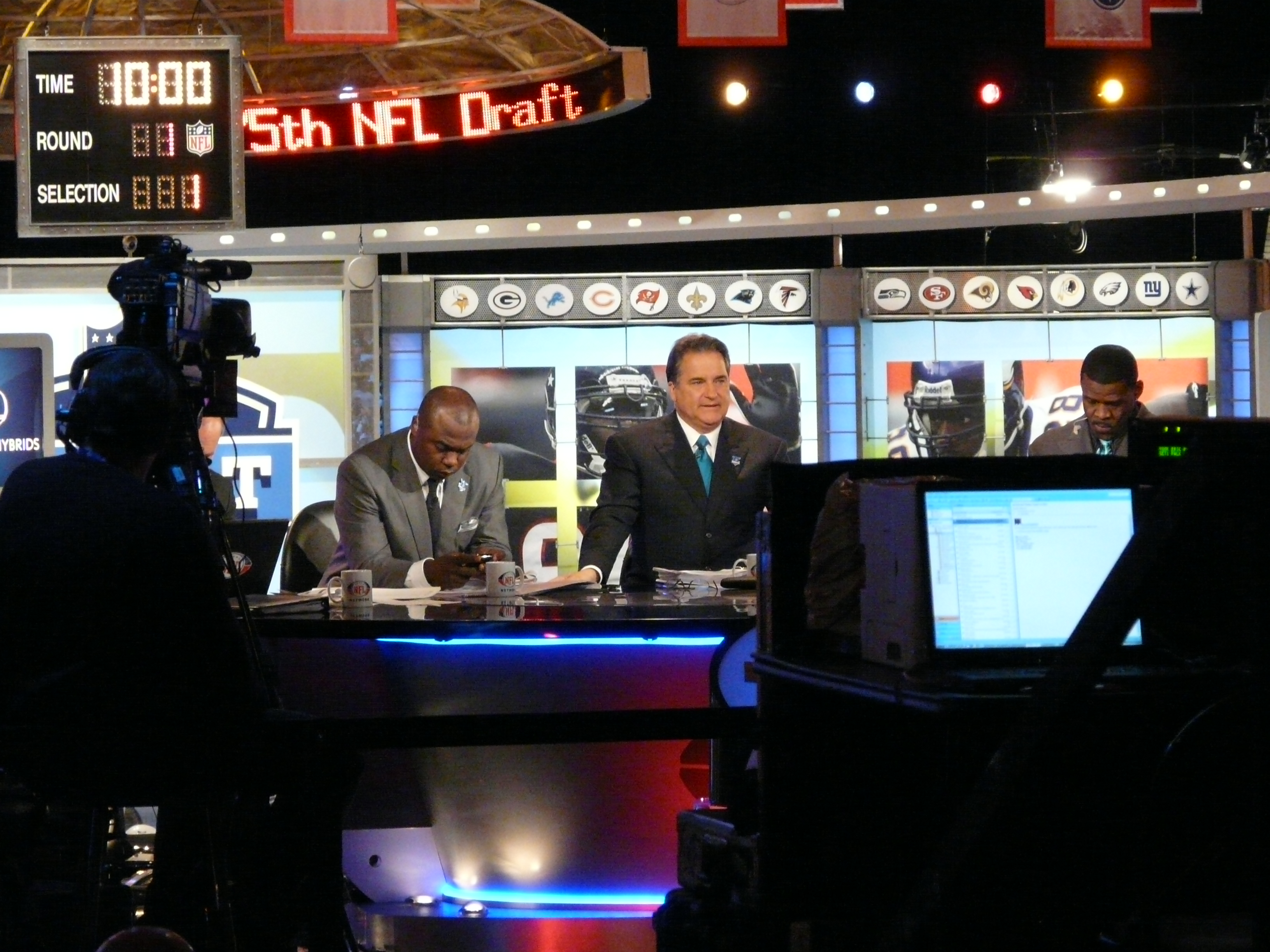
Irvin (right) with the NFL Network in 2010

Irvin was a co-star in the 2005 remake of The Longest Yard, starring Adam Sandler and Chris Rock. Irvin also guest starred in Sandler's film Jack & Jill, which was released on November 11, 2011. He was one of the "Pros" on an episode of Pros vs. Joes, which pitted former professional athletes against average people. He was the host of 4th and Long, a football-themed reality series which aired on Spike TV. The winner, Jesse Holley, earned a spot at the Dallas Cowboys' training camp. Irvin had a supporting role in the 2017 basketball drama Slamma Jamma as a sleazy sports agent.

In 2011, Irvin spoke to Out magazine about his homosexual older brother, who died of stomach cancer in 2006. He claimed his initial feelings of homophobia in relation to his brother led to womanizing during his playing days but eventual acceptance and feelings of love toward his older brother initiated his understanding for people with difficulty sharing their circumstances.

In August 2011, officials from the Elite Football League of India announced that Irvin would be among the primary investors and advisers for the league. Other prominent backers included former Chicago Bears head coach Mike Ditka, former Philadelphia Eagles quarterback Ron Jaworski, and NFL linebacker Brandon Chillar.

In July 2023, management from Asset Entities announced that Irvin would be among the primary investors and advisers for the company. Other prominent backers included TRITON FUNDS.

In January 2026, Irvin along with Netflix launched The White House with Michael Irvin, a sports video podcast set to air twice a month.
