= Matt Vanderbeek =

American football player (born 1967)

No. 58, 91
- Position: Linebacker

Personal information
- Born: August 16, 1967 (age 59); Saugatuck, Michigan, U.S.
- Listed height: 6 ft 3 in (1.91 m)
- Listed weight: 255 lb (116 kg)

Career information
- High school: West Ottawa (MI)
- College: Michigan State
- NFL draft: 1990: undrafted

Career history
- Indianapolis Colts (1990); Minnesota Vikings (1991); Indianapolis Colts (1991–1992); Dallas Cowboys (1993–1994); Washington Redskins (1995–1996)

Awards and highlights
- Super Bowl champion (XXVIII)

Career NFL statistics
- Tackles: 57
- Fumble recoveries: 1
- Stats at Pro Football Reference

Matthew James Vanderbeek (born August 16, 1967) is an American former professional football player who was a linebacker in the National Football League (NFL) for the Indianapolis Colts, Minnesota Vikings, Dallas Cowboys and Washington Redskins. He played college football for the Michigan State Spartans.

== Early life ==
Vanderbeek attended West Ottawa High School, where he practiced football and track. As a senior linebacker, he posted 104 tackles (13 for loss) and 7 sacks, while receiving All-state honors.

He accepted a football scholarship to play for Michigan State University. As a junior, he was switched from outside linebacker to defensive end and became a starter.

As a senior, he posted 60 tackles (11 for loss), 2 sacks, 5 fumble recoveries, one forced fumble and earned honorable-mention All-Big Ten. He finished his college career with 119 career tackles, 21 tackles for loss, 5 quarterback sacks.

== Professional career ==
=== Indianapolis Colts (first stint) ===
Vanderbeek was signed as an undrafted free agent by the Indianapolis Colts after the 1990 NFL draft on April 30. As rookie, he was converted into an inside linebacker, appearing in 16 games with 7 starts, while registering 46 defensive tackles, one forced fumble and 7 special teams tackles (seventh on the team). He started the last 4 games at left inside linebacker in place of an injured Fredd Young.

=== Minnesota Vikings ===
On March 18, 1991, he signed in Plan B free agency with the Minnesota Vikings. He suffered a hand injury in training camp and was placed on the injured reserve list on August 27. He was released on October 8.

=== Indianapolis Colts (second stint) ===
On October 23, 1991, Vanderbeek was signed by the Indianapolis Colts. He started at left inside linebacker in place of an injured Scott Radecic against the Cleveland Browns. He finished the season with 11 defensive tackles and 2 special teams tackles.

He was released on August 31, 1992. He was re-signed on September 9. He became a special teams standout, leading the team with 18 tackles. He was cut on August 30, 1993.

=== Dallas Cowboys ===
On August 31, 1993, Vanderbeek was claimed off waivers by the Dallas Cowboys. He registered 22 special teams tackles (second on the team) and contributed to the team winning Super Bowl XXVIII. In 1994, he finished with 16 special teams tackles (seventh on the team).

=== Washington Redskins ===
On March 28, 1995, Vanderbeek signed as a free agent with the Washington Redskins. He was placed on the injured reserve list on September 4, 1996, after suffering a torn rotator cuff injury against the Philadelphia Eagles.

== Personal life ==
Vanderbeek currently works as a real estate broker.
