= Jimmie Jones =

American football player (born 1966)

No. 97, 98
- Position: Defensive tackle

Personal information
- Born: January 9, 1966 (age 60); Lakeland, Florida, U.S.
- Listed height: 6 ft 4 in (1.93 m)
- Listed weight: 285 lb (129 kg)

Career information
- High school: Okeechobee (FL)
- College: Miami (FL)
- NFL draft: 1990: 3rd round, 64th overall pick

Career history
- Dallas Cowboys (1990–1993); Los Angeles/St. Louis Rams (1994–1996); Philadelphia Eagles (1997)

Awards and highlights
- 2× Super Bowl champion (XXVII, XXVIII); PFWA All-Rookie Team (1990); 2× National champion (1987, 1989)

Career NFL statistics
- Tackles: 277
- Sacks: 32
- Fumble recoveries: 5
- Stats at Pro Football Reference

Jimmie Sims Jones (born January 9, 1966) is an American former professional football player who was a defensive tackle in the National Football League (NFL) for the Dallas Cowboys, Los Angeles/St. Louis Rams, and Philadelphia Eagles. He played college football at the University of Miami. With the Cowboys, he won back-to-back Super Bowls over the Buffalo Bills.

== Early life ==
Jones attended Okeechobee High School, but because he had to work to help support his mother, he didn't play football until his junior year when he only played in the last 4 games of the season, nevertheless, he still led the team in sacks and was third in tackles. He would miss all of his senior season football games, because he had to work in a drugstore during the team's summer workouts and the new head coach put in place a policy that left him out of the team.

His high school athletic director (Jim Kirk) sent a highlight tape of his only games as a starter to different colleges, which eventually helped him get a football scholarship from the University of Miami. He was a backup defensive end as a redshirt freshman.

As a sophomore, he started the season opener at right defensive tackle. The next week he broke his hand in practice, but still managed to finish the season second on the team in quarterback pressures and posted a career-high 12 tackles against East Carolina University.

As a junior, he started the final 4 games at right defensive tackle, registering 8 tackles and 2 sacks in the 23-3 win against Nebraska in the 1989 Orange Bowl.

As a senior, he was forced to miss spring workouts in order to earn money as a valet attendant at a restaurant, giving Cortez Kennedy the edge to start at right defensive tackle. He missed 3 games with a knee injury. He rotated with Kennedy and Russell Maryland, helping the team lead the nation in scoring defense and total defense. He finished his college career winning two national championships (1987 and 1989), while recording 105 tackles, 68 assists and 16 1/2 sacks.

== Professional career ==
=== Dallas Cowboys ===
Although he was a backup during his college career, Jones was selected by the Dallas Cowboys in the third round (64th overall) of the 1990 NFL draft. As a rookie, he had his best year, working as the primary backup at both defensive tackle positions and starting a total of six games, with five games replacing an injured Dean Hamel. At the end of the season, he finished tied with defensive end Danny Stubbs for the team lead with 7 1/2 sacks, while adding 60 tackles, three passes defensed and 14 quarterback pressures. He also ranked sixth among all interior lineman in the NFL in sacks and was voted to the All-rookie team. Jones and DeMarcus Ware are the only rookies to ever lead or tie for the Cowboys' team lead in sacks.

In 1991, he started five games at right defensive tackle. He finished the season with 33 tackles, six tackles for loss (second on the team), two sacks and 10 quarterback pressures.

In 1992, he started the season opener at left defensive tackle in place of an injured Tony Casillas, making five tackles (two for loss), and one quarterback pressure. He also started in the third game against the Phoenix Cardinals. He finished the season with 23 tackles, four sacks, 11 quarterback pressures and one forced fumble. In Super Bowl XXVII he recovered two fumbles (tied Super Bowl record), including one that went for a two-yard touchdown, giving the Cowboys a 14-7 lead in the first quarter.

In 1993, he posted 24 tackles, 5.5 sacks, 16 quarterback pressures and one blocked kick. He also was a part of one of the most famous Thanksgiving football plays, when he blocked a 41-yard field goal attempt from the Miami Dolphins' Pete Stoyanovich, to preserve what seemed an apparent 14-13 victory, but as the ball rolled toward the Cowboys' end zone, Leon Lett kicked the ball and the Dolphins recovered. Stoyanovich would go on to convert a second field goal with three seconds left, giving the Dolphins a 16-14 victory.

During his four-year Cowboys career, he helped the team win two Super Bowls against the Buffalo Bills twice, played a total of 65 games, starting 16 and recording 19 sacks. He was an effective pass rusher who got most of his playing time on passing downs, and was key backup in the best defense and best defensive line rotation in the NFL.

=== Los Angeles/St. Louis Rams ===
On March 4, 1994, the Los Angeles Rams signed Jones to a four-year contract for $7.7 million, including a $2 signing bonus. He played in 14 games (starting all) and recorded five sacks.

In 1995, the Rams owner Georgia Frontiere, moved the franchise to St. Louis, Missouri. Jones started 16 games at left defensive tackle and did not record a sack.

In 1996, he started 16 games, registering 61 tackles and 5.5 sacks. On April 22, 1997, he was released by the Rams in a salary cap move.

=== Philadelphia Eagles ===
On July 22, 1997, the Philadelphia Eagles signed Jones to a one-year contract. He posted 7 tackles and 2.5 sacks in 14 games, while coming in on passing downs, a role he played while in Dallas. He wasn't re-signed after the season.
