= 2006 Dallas Cowboys season =

NFL team season

- Owner: Jerry Jones
- General manager: Jerry Jones
- Head coach: Bill Parcells
- Defensive coordinator: Mike Zimmer
- Home stadium: Texas Stadium

Results
- Record: 9–7
- Division place: 2nd NFC East
- Playoffs: Lost Wild Card Playoffs (at Seahawks) 20–21
- All-Pros: Mat McBriar (2nd team); DeMarcus Ware (2nd team)
- Pro Bowlers: Flozell Adams T Andre Gurode C Mat McBriar P Tony Romo QB; DeMarcus Ware LB; Roy Williams S Jason Witten TE

Uniform
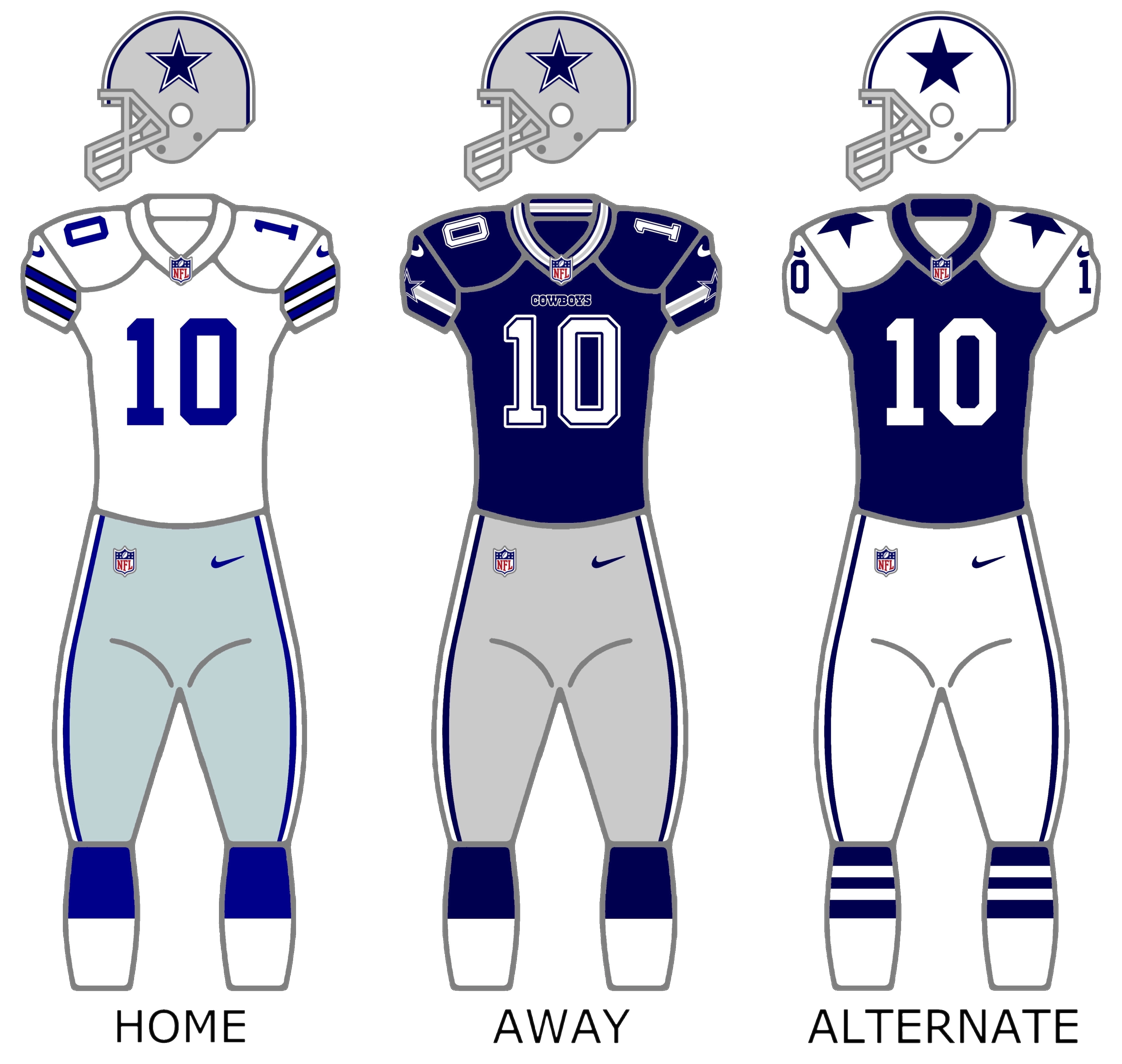

The 2006 Dallas Cowboys season was the 47th season for the team in the National Football League (NFL) and the fourth and final under head coach Bill Parcells. The season began with the team trying to improve on their 9–7 record in 2005. The base offense was changed to a 2-tight end formation. Several high-profile free agents were signed including colorful, yet controversial wide receiver Terrell Owens and kicker Mike Vanderjagt. Veteran defensive end Greg Ellis was also converted into a linebacker.

Although veteran Drew Bledsoe was the initial starter at quarterback, fourth-year backup Tony Romo replaced Bledsoe at halftime of their Week 7 matchup with the New York Giants. Romo became the starter in Week 8 due to Bledsoe's rough starts with frequent sacks and interceptions. Romo initially played very well, going 5–1 in his first six NFL starts, including a win over the previously unbeaten Indianapolis Colts, but he finished the season 1–3 with six touchdowns, six interceptions, and two fumbles lost. The Cowboys secured a playoff berth for the first time since 2003, but they did not win the division when in the final week they were defeated by a 2 win Detroit Lions team. The Cowboys lost in the Wild Card round of the playoffs to the Seattle Seahawks 21–20, a game in which Romo famously botched the hold on a go-ahead field goal inside the final two minutes.

When Romo started the Thanksgiving Day game against the Tampa Bay Buccaneers, it marked the 7th different Cowboys starting quarterback in seven consecutive Thanksgiving Day games (Troy Aikman, Ryan Leaf, Chad Hutchinson, Quincy Carter, Drew Henson, Drew Bledsoe, and Romo).

Bill Parcells retired after the season ended.

== Offseason ==
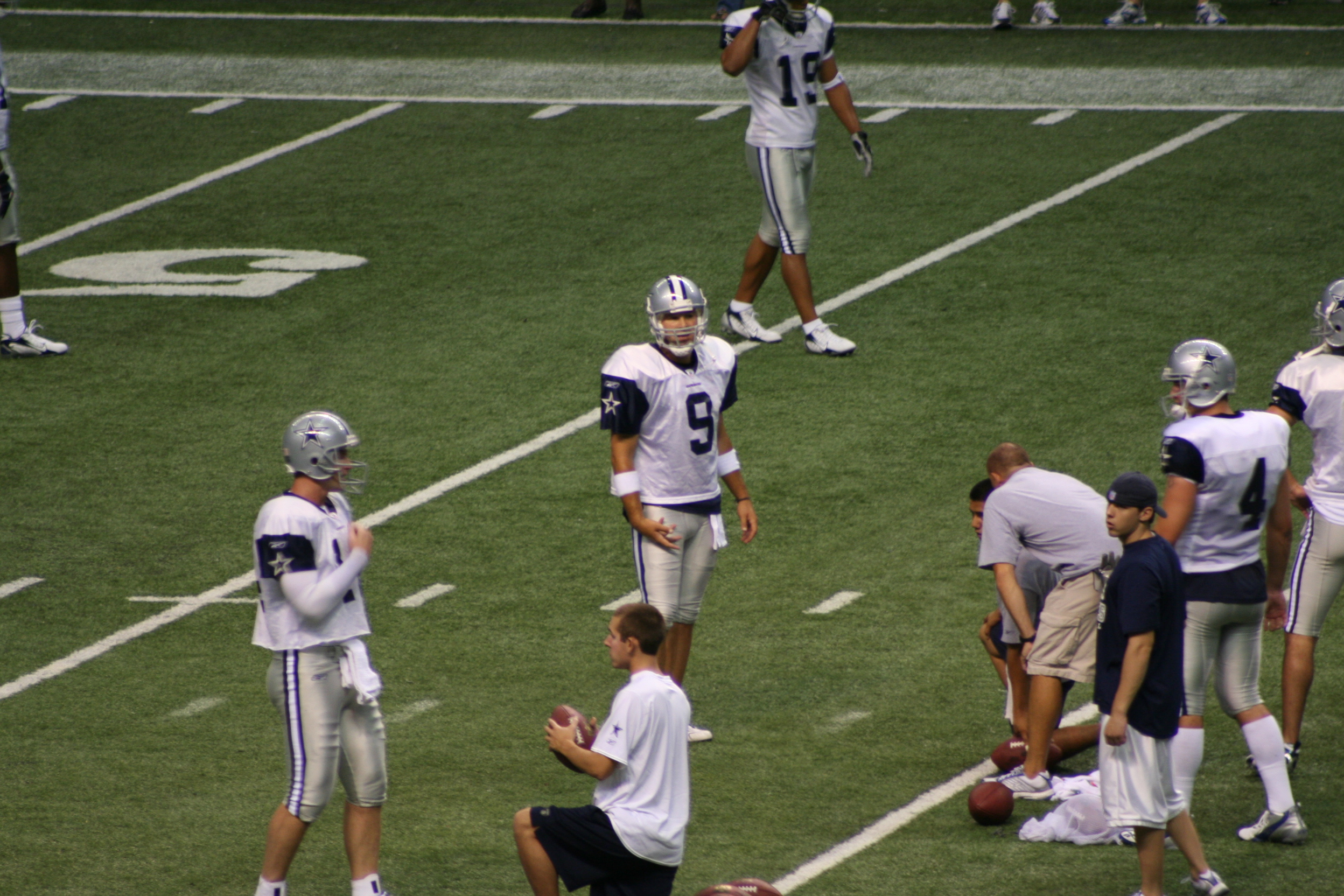
Dallas players including QB Tony Romo before a 2006 preseason game

During the 2006 offseason, the team signed several high-profile players, including kicker Mike Vanderjagt, linebacker Akin Ayodele, offensive linemen Jason Fabini and Kyle Kosier, safety Marcus Coleman, and highly controversial wide receiver Terrell Owens, who has developed a reputation for causing conflicts with teammates, coaches, opposing players, and fans. The signing of Terrell Owens received a lot of media attention, and was arguably the biggest news story during the NFL offseason. Vanderjagt had the highest field goal percentage in NFL history coming into the season and his signing was expected to solve the inconsistency problems in the Cowboys kicking game. However, Vanderjagt missed most of the pre-season with an injury and missed three very short kicks (including an extra point) in the final pre-season game (which ended in a tie).

The Cowboys also lost veteran leadership in the locker room after losing tight end Dan Campbell to the Detroit Lions, wide receiver Keyshawn Johnson to the Carolina Panthers, left guard Larry Allen to the San Francisco 49ers, defensive tackle La'Roi Glover to the St. Louis Rams, and linebacker Dat Nguyen to a career-ending injury.

The team didn't receive much help from the 2006 NFL draft, but experienced much more success with that year's rookie undrafted free agents: Miles Austin, Stephen Bowen, Sam Hurd and Oliver Hoyte. Abram Elam, who was an undrafted free agent with the Miami Dolphins in 2005 and was out of football after being released in training camp that year, also contributed in special teams and in some defensive packages.

Before the season, there were high expectations for the Dallas Cowboys. Sports Illustrated writer Peter King predicted the Cowboys would win Super Bowl XLI.

== 2006 draft class ==
2006 Dallas Cowboys draft
Round	Pick	Player	Position	College	Notes
1	18	Bobby Carpenter	LB	Ohio State	
2	53	Anthony Fasano	TE	Notre Dame	
3	92	Jason Hatcher *	DE	Grambling State	
4	125	Skyler Green	WR	LSU	
5	138	Pat Watkins	S	Florida State	
6	182	Montavious Stanley	DT	Louisville	
7	211	Pat McQuistan	OT	Weber State	
7	224	E.J. Whitley	OT	Texas Tech	
Made roster † Pro Football Hall of Fame * Made at least one Pro Bowl during career

Notes

- The Cowboys traded their second-round (No. 49 overall) selection to the New York Jets in exchange for second (No. 53 overall), sixth (No. 189 overall) and seventh-round (No. 211 overall) selections.
- The Cowboys traded their third-round (No. 80 overall) selection to the Jacksonville Jaguars for third (No. 92 overall) and fourth-round (No. 125 overall) selections.
- The Cowboys traded their 2005 fifth-round (No. 148 overall) and 2006 fourth-round (No. 116 overall) selections to the Philadelphia Eagles for 2005 fourth-round (No. 132 overall) and 2006 sixth-round (No. 182 overall) selections.
- The Cowboys traded their fifth (No. 150 overall) and sixth-round (No. 189 overall, from New York Jets) selections to the Jets in exchange for a fifth-round (No. 138 overall) selection.
- The Cowboys traded their sixth-round (No. 186 overall) and 2007 conditional (not exercised) selections to the Kansas City Chiefs in exchange for linebacker Scott Fujita.

== Schedule ==
=== Preseason ===
Date	Opponent	Result	Record	Game site	NFL Recap
August 12	at Seattle Seahawks	W 13–3	1-0	Qwest Field	Recap
August 21	at New Orleans Saints	W 30–7	2-0	Independence Stadium	Recap
August 26	San Francisco 49ers	W 17–7	3-0	Texas Stadium	Recap
August 31	Minnesota Vikings	T 10–10 (OT)	3-0-1	Texas Stadium	Recap

=== Regular season ===
Week	Date	Opponent	Result	Record	Game site	NFL Recap
1	September 10	at Jacksonville Jaguars	L 17–24	0-1	Alltel Stadium	Recap
2	September 17	Washington Redskins	W 27–10	1-1	Texas Stadium	Recap
3	September 24	Bye				
4	October 1	at Tennessee Titans	W 45–14	2-1	LP Field	Recap
5	October 8	at Philadelphia Eagles	L 24–38	2-2	Lincoln Financial Field	Recap
6	October 15	Houston Texans	W 34–6	3-2	Texas Stadium	Recap
7	October 23	New York Giants	L 22–36	3-3	Texas Stadium	Recap
8	October 29	at Carolina Panthers	W 35–14	4-3	Bank of America Stadium	Recap
9	November 5	at Washington Redskins	L 19–22	4-4	FedExField	Recap
10	November 12	at Arizona Cardinals	W 27–10	5-4	University of Phoenix Stadium	Recap
11	November 19	Indianapolis Colts	W 21–14	6-4	Texas Stadium	Recap
12	November 23	Tampa Bay Buccaneers	W 38–10	7-4	Texas Stadium	Recap
13	December 3	at New York Giants	W 23–20	8-4	Giants Stadium	Recap
14	December 10	New Orleans Saints	L 17–42	8-5	Texas Stadium	Recap
15	December 16	at Atlanta Falcons	W 38–28	9-5	Georgia Dome	Recap
16	December 25	Philadelphia Eagles	L 7–23	9-6	Texas Stadium	Recap
17	December 31	Detroit Lions	L 31–39	9-7	Texas Stadium	Recap

== Standings ==
NFC East
	W	L	T	PCT	DIV	CONF	PF	PA	STK
^{(3)} Philadelphia Eagles	10	6	0	.625	5–1	9–3	398	328	W5
^{(5)} Dallas Cowboys	9	7	0	.563	2–4	6–6	425	350	L2
^{(6)} New York Giants	8	8	0	.500	4–2	7–5	355	362	W1
Washington Redskins	5	11	0	.313	1–5	3–9	307	376	L2

== Regular season ==
=== Week 1: at Jacksonville Jaguars ===
Quarter	1	2	3	4	Total
Cowboys	10	0	0	7	17
Jaguars	0	10	0	14	24

at Alltel Stadium, Jacksonville, Florida

- Game time: 4:15 p.m. EST/3:15 p.m. CST
- Game weather: 82 °F (28 °C), occasional showers
- Game attendance: 67,164
- TV announcers (Fox): Joe Buck, Troy Aikman, and Pam Oliver

The Cowboys opened the regular season on the road against the Jacksonville Jaguars on September 10. The Cowboys built a lead of 10–0 just 10 minutes into the game, but allowed 24 consecutive points in later quarters. Quarterback Drew Bledsoe threw two interceptions, and placekicker Shaun Suisham missed a field goal off the right upright. The Cowboys scored again during the final minutes of the fourth quarter, when newly signed wide receiver Terrell Owens caught his first touchdown in a Dallas uniform, which was also his first regular-season game since October 2005. Dallas attempted and failed an onside kick, but received the ball again when their defense prevented the Jaguars from getting a first down. The Cowboys drive to tie the game ended with a Bledsoe interception. With the loss, the Cowboys started out their season at 0–1. Stats

==== Scoring summary ====
- Q1 – 8:06 – 23-yard TD run by Julius Jones (7–0 DAL)
- Q1 – 5:35 – 32-yard FG by Shaun Suisham (10–0 DAL)
- Q2 – 8:48 – 35-yard FG by Josh Scobee (10–3 DAL)
- Q2 – 0:07 – 6-yard TD pass from Byron Leftwich to Reggie Williams (10–10)
- Q4 – 11:27 – 3-yard TD run by Byron Leftwich (17–10 JAC)
- Q4 – 3:13 – 5-yard TD run by Fred Taylor (24–10 JAC)
- Q4 – 1:54 – 21-yard pass from Drew Bledsoe to Terrell Owens (24–17 JAC)

=== Week 2: vs. Washington Redskins ===
Quarter	1	2	3	4	Total
Redskins	0	10	0	0	10
Cowboys	10	7	0	10	27

at Texas Stadium, Irving, Texas

- Game time: 8:15 p.m. EST/7:15 p.m. CST
- Game weather: 73 °F (23 °C), light rain
- Game attendance: 63,152
- TV announcers (NBC): Al Michaels and John Madden

Mike Vanderjagt kicked two field goals, one of which was 50 yards long. Drew Bledsoe threw for a touchdown in the first and the fourth quarters for the first time since 2005. The Cowboys defense allowed no touchdowns, with the only touchdown for the Redskins coming from a kickoff return by Rock Cartwright. It was also the first time that the Cowboys had allowed zero second-half points since November 20, 2005 against the Detroit Lions. Stats

In the game, Terrell Owens broke his finger.

With the win, the Cowboys went into their bye week at 1–1.

==== Scoring summary ====
- Q1 – 7:59 – 26-yard FG run by Mike Vanderjagt (3–0 DAL)
- Q1 – 2:33 – 4-yard TD pass from Drew Bledsoe to Patrick Crayton (10–0 DAL)
- Q2 – 14:20 – 39-yard FG by John Hall (10–3 DAL)
- Q2 – 8:38 – 1-yard TD run by Marion Barber (17–3 DAL)
- Q2 – 8:25 – 100-yard kickoff return TD by Rock Cartwright (17–10 DAL)
- Q4 – 14:53 – 40-yard TD pass from Drew Bledsoe to Terry Glenn (24–10 DAL)
- Q4 – 7:43 – 50 FG by Mike Vanderjagt (27–10 DAL)

=== Week 4: at Tennessee Titans ===
Quarter	1	2	3	4	Total
Cowboys	7	7	14	17	45
Titans	3	3	8	0	14

at LP Field, Nashville, Tennessee

- Game time: 1:00 p.m. EST/12:00 p.m. CST
- Game weather: 75 °F (24 °C), sunny
- Game attendance: 69,143
- Referee: Jerome Boger
- TV announcers (Fox): Dick Stockton, Daryl Johnston, and Tony Siragusa

After their Bye Week, the Cowboys traveled to LP Field to face the Tennessee Titans. Rookie Quarterback Vince Young made his first NFL start for the Titans. Quarterback Drew Bledsoe threw two touchdowns in the first half to Terry Glenn. Each of the three Cowboys running backs, Julius Jones, Marion Barber, and Tyson Thompson, rushed for a touchdown in the second half. Bradie James returned an interception 15 yards for his first career touchdown. Tony Romo played during the final two drives after Dallas took a 38–14 lead. Kicker Mike Vanderjagt missed a 26-yard field goal wide right late in the first half, but later kicked a 43-yard field goal in the fourth quarter. Despite breaking a finger two weeks earlier, wide receiver Terrell Owens started and caught five passes for 88 yards. Also, rookie Pat Watkins returned a lost Titans fumble 53 yards during the fourth quarter as the Cowboys held on for the win to improve their record to 2–1. Stats

During the game, Tennessee Titans defensive tackle Albert Haynesworth stomped on Dallas Cowboys center Andre Gurode. Haynesworth was suspended for five games without pay. . Later during the week, Terrell Owens accidentally overdosed on painkillers causing a media circus, but recovered within a day.

==== Scoring summary ====
- Q1 – 7:26 – 33-yard FG by Rob Bironas (3–0 TEN)
- Q1 – 0:34 – 13-yard TD pass from Drew Bledsoe to Terry Glenn (7–3 DAL)
- Q2 – 12:43 – 13-yard TD pass from Drew Bledsoe to Terry Glenn (14–3 DAL)
- Q2 – 0:00 – 39-yard FG by Rob Bironas (14–6 DAL)
- Q3 – 11:53 – 5-yard TD run by Julius Jones (21–6 DAL)
- Q3 – 6:38 – 1-yard TD run by Marion Barber (28–6 DAL)
- Q3 – 3:40 – 17-yard TD pass from Vince Young to Ben Troupe, and Vince Young run for two-point conversion (28–14 DAL)
- Q4 – 13:04 – 43-yard FG by Mike Vanderjagt (31–14 DAL)
- Q4 – 8:23 – 15-yard TD interception return by Bradie James (38–14 DAL)
- Q4 – 5:43 – 5-yard TD run by Tyson Thompson (45–14 DAL)

=== Week 5: at Philadelphia Eagles ===
Quarter	1	2	3	4	Total
Cowboys	7	14	0	3	24
Eagles	10	7	7	14	38

at Lincoln Financial Field, Philadelphia

- Game time: 4:15 p.m. EST/3:15 p.m. CST
- Game weather: 70 °F (21 °C), sunny
- Game attendance: 69,268
- TV announcers (Fox): Joe Buck, Troy Aikman, and Pam Oliver

The game received significant attention due to Terrell Owens' return to Philadelphia, where he had played for 2 years with considerable controversy. Owens had 3 receptions for 45 yards. The Eagles capitalized on early Dallas turnovers, and the Cowboys fell behind 10–0. The Cowboys rallied to score a touchdown. At halftime, the Cowboys were up 21–17. However, in the second half the Cowboys offense was dominated by the Eagles defense and were held to only 3 points. In the fourth quarter, the defining play took place as the Cowboys, assisted by a pass interference penalty, managed to reach the Eagles six-yard line with less than a minute left. On second and goal, Drew Bledsoe threw an interception in the end zone that was returned 102 yards by Lito Sheppard for a touchdown, essentially ending any chance of a Dallas victory as the team fell to 2–2. Stats

==== Scoring summary ====
- Q1 – 11:37 – 5-yard TD run by Brian Westbrook (7–0 PHI)
- Q1 – 9:59 – 27-yard FG by David Akers (10–0 PHI)
- Q1 – 4:11 – 2-yard TD run by Marion Barber (10–7 PHI)
- Q2 – 10:30 – 69-yard TD opponent fumble return by DeMarcus Ware (14–10 DAL)
- Q2 – 9:13 – 1-yard TD run by Donovan McNabb (17–14 PHI)
- Q2 – 3:23 – 7-yard TD run by Drew Bledsoe (21–17 DAL)
- Q3 – 7:28 – 87-yard TD pass from Donovan McNabb to Hank Baskett (24–21 PHI)
- Q4 – 11:14 – 39-yard FG by Mike Vanderjagt (24–24)
- Q4 – 8:23 – 40-yard TD pass from Donovan McNabb to Reggie Brown (31–24 PHI)
- Q4 – 0:16 – 102-yard TD interception return by Lito Sheppard (38–24 PHI)

=== Week 6: vs. Houston Texans ===
Quarter	1	2	3	4	Total
Texans	3	3	0	0	6
Cowboys	0	3	14	17	34

at Texas Stadium, Irving, Texas

- Game time: 1:00 p.m. EST/12:00 p.m. CST
- Game weather: 66 °F (19 °C), light rain
- Game attendance: 63,186
- Referee: Larry Nemmers
- TV announcers (CBS): Dick Enberg and Randy Cross

Hoping to rebound from their road loss to the Eagles, the Cowboys returned home for a Week 6 battle against their in-state rival, the Houston Texans. In the first quarter, Dallas trailed early when Kris Brown kicked a 19-yard field goal for an early Houston 3–0 lead. In the second quarter, the Cowboys tied the game at 3–3 when Mike Vanderjagt kicked a 22-yard field goal. At the end of the first half, Houston regained the lead when Brown kicked a 48-yard field goal. For the rest of the game, the Dallas defense shut out the Houston Texans. Drew Bledsoe and Terrell Owens hooked up on two touchdown passes, and Marion Barber ran a 1-yard touchdown, Vanderjagt kicked another 21-yard field goal, and backup quarterback Tony Romo threw another touchdown pass to Owens. Tony Romo completed his first two NFL passes, including one touchdown.

With the win, the Cowboys improved to 3–2.

Stats

==== Scoring summary ====
- Q1 – 8:55 – 19-yard FG by Kris Brown (3–0 HOU)
- Q2 – 5:58 – 22-yard TD FG by Mike Vanderjagt (3–3)
- Q2 – 0:00 – 48-yard FG by Kris Brown (6–3 HOU)
- Q3 – 10:13 – 3-yard TD pass from Drew Bledsoe to Terrell Owens (10–6 DAL)
- Q3 – 3:41 – 21-yard TD pass from Drew Bledsoe to Terrell Owens (17–6 DAL)
- Q4 – 14:57 – 1 yd run by Marion Barber (24–6 DAL)
- Q4 – 11:28 – 21-yard FG by Mike Vanderjagt (27–6 DAL)
- Q4 – 2:24 – 2 yd TD pass from Tony Romo to Terrell Owens (34–6 DAL)

=== Week 7: vs. New York Giants ===
Quarter	1	2	3	4	Total
Giants	9	3	14	10	36
Cowboys	0	7	0	15	22

at Texas Stadium, Irving, Texas

- Game time: 8:30 p.m. EST/7:30 p.m. CST
- Game weather: 63 °F (17 °C), clear
- Game attendance: 63,512
- TV announcers (ESPN): Mike Tirico, Tony Kornheiser and Joe Theismann

Hoping to build on their win over the Houston Texans, the Cowboys stayed at home for a Monday Night match-up with their NFC East rival, the New York Giants. On the Giants opening drive, Eli Manning threw a 50-yard touchdown to Plaxico Burress. Later in the first quarter after Jeff Feagles punted inside the one-yard line, LaVar Arrington sacked Drew Bledsoe in the endzone for a safety. In the second quarter, Giants kicker Jay Feely kicked a 31-yard field goal. Dallas would score before halftime as Bledsoe ran 1-yard touchdown on a quarterback sneak. Bledsoe also threw a costly interception just before halftime that would have given the Cowboys a 14–12 lead at the break. Due to Bledsoe's abysmal performance, head coach Bill Parcells replaced him with backup quarterback Tony Romo at the start of the second half. Not much had changed for the Giants in the third quarter as Manning threw a 13-yard touchdown pass to Jeremy Shockey and Brandon Jacobs got a 3-yard touchdown run. In the fourth quarter, Romo completed an 8-yard TD pass to WR Terrell Owens and subsequently ran into the endzone for a two-point conversion. The Giants pulled away as Feely kicked a 32-yard field goal, while rookie cornerback Kevin Dockery would return an interception 96 yards for a touchdown. Even though Romo threw a 53-yard touchdown to Patrick Crayton, the damage had already been done.

With the loss, the Cowboys fell to 3–3.

Stats

==== Scoring summary ====
- Q1 – 12:01 – 50-yard TD pass from Eli Manning to Plaxico Burress (7–0 NYG)
- Q1 – 3:59 – Drew Bledsoe tackled in the end zone by LaVar Arrington for a safety (9–0 NYG)
- Q2 – 11:51 – 31-yard FG by Jay Feely (12–0 NYG)
- Q2 – 3:51 – 1-yard TD run by Drew Bledsoe (12–7 NYG)
- Q3 – 14:01 – 13-yard TD pass from Eli Manning to Jeremy Shockey (19–7 NYG)
- Q3 – 1:26 – 3 yd TD run by Brandon Jacobs (26–7 NYG)
- Q4 – 13:01 – 8 yd TD pass from Tony Romo to Terrell Owens–Tony Romo on Suc. 2-Point Conv. (26–15 NYG)
- Q4 – 3:54 – 32 yd FG by Jay Feely (29–15 NYG)
- Q4 – 2:33 – 96 yd TD interception return by Kevin Dockery (36–15 NYG)
- Q4 – 2:03 – 53 yd TD pass from Tony Romo to Patrick Crayton (36–22 NYG)

=== Week 8: at Carolina Panthers ===
Quarter	1	2	3	4	Total
Cowboys	0	10	0	25	35
Panthers	14	0	0	0	14

at Bank of America Stadium, Charlotte, North Carolina

- Game time: 8:00 p.m. EST/7:00 p.m. CST
- Game weather: 53 °F (12 °C), clear
- Game attendance: 73,682
- TV announcers (NBC): Al Michaels and John Madden

Six days after losing at home, Tony Romo made his first NFL regular season start against the Carolina Panthers, and he threw for 270 yards, a touchdown, and an interception. In the first quarter, the Panthers scored 14 points when DeShaun Foster, and later Steve Smith ran a touchdown, but those were the last points that Dallas allowed in the game. In the second quarter, Jason Witten caught a touchdown pass and Mike Vanderjagt kicked a field goal. In the fourth quarter, Dallas scored a franchise record 25 points on a Julius Jones run, two Marion Barber runs, another Mike Vanderjagt field goal, two extra points and a two-point conversion caught by Terrell Owens. Terrell Owens had his first 100+ yard game with 107 receiving yards. Julius Jones ran 92 yards for 616 yards in 7 games to start the season. Steve Smith was held to only 55 receiving yards and former Cowboys receiver Keyshawn Johnson only had one catch for 19 yards. The game marked unusual emotion from Bill Parcells, who was moved by the appearance of his former Giants players (such as Jim Burt) and who embraced many of his players late in the game.

With the win, the Cowboys improved to 4–3.

Stats

==== Scoring summary ====
- Q1 – 3:35 – 1-yard TD run by DeShaun Foster (0–7 CAR), John Kasay extra point is good
- Q1 – 1:21 – 24-yard TD run by Steve Smith (0–14 CAR), John Kasay extra point is good
- Q2 – 12:12 – 3-yard TD pass from Tony Romo to Jason Witten, Mike Vanderjagt extra point is good (7–14 CAR)
- Q2 – 0:27 – 38-yard FG by Mike Vanderjagt (10–14 CAR)
- Q4 – 9:52 – 24-yard FG by Mike Vanderjagt (13–14 CAR)
- Q4 – 9:43 – 14-yard TD run by Julius Jones, pass from Tony Romo to Terrell Owens on successful 2-Point conversion) (21–14 DAL)
- Q4 – 2:17 – 3-yard TD run by Marion Barber, Mike Vanderjagt extra point is good (28–14 DAL)
- Q4 – 1:37 – 14-yard TD run by Marion Barber, Mike Vanderjagt extra point is good (35–14 DAL)

=== Week 9: at Washington Redskins ===
Quarter	1	2	3	4	Total
Cowboys	0	12	7	0	19
Redskins	5	7	0	10	22

at Fedex Field, Landover, Maryland

- Game time: 1:00 p.m. EST/12:00 p.m. CST
- Game weather: 51 °F (11 °C), sunny
- Game attendance: 90,250
- TV announcers (Fox): Joe Buck, Troy Aikman, and Pam Oliver

With the emergence of QB Tony Romo in their road victory over the Panthers, the Cowboys flew to FedExField for a rematch with the Washington Redskins. In the first quarter, Dallas trailed early as Redskins MLB Lemar Marshall tackled RB Julius Jones in the endzone for a safety and kicker Nick Novak kicked a 28-yard field goal. In the second quarter, the Cowboys started to fight back, as Romo completed a 10-yard TD pass to WR Terry Glenn (with a failed two-point conversion) and kicker Mike Vanderjagt kicked a 33-yard field goal. The 'Skins would retaliate as RB Clinton Portis ran 38 yards for a touchdown, yet Vanderjagt would allow Dallas to tie at halftime on a 30-yard field goal. In the third quarter, the Cowboys increased their lead with Romo completing a 4-yard TD pass to WR Terrell Owens, who would do a "sleeping celebration." afterwards. He would get flagged for excessive celebration. The "sleeping celebration" referenced Owens' admission earlier in the week that he has trouble staying awake during team meetings. In the fourth quarter, Washington fought back with QB Mark Brunell completing an 18-yard TD pass to TE Chris Cooley. Afterwards, the Redskins would block a 35-yard field goal try by Vanderjagt, which would get picked up by Sean Taylor and returned it 30 yards before getting tackled. Even though time ran out, the Redskins would get one chance to win, due to a face mask infraction penalty on Guard Kyle Kosier. Washington took advantage, as Novak kicked the game-winning 47-yard field goal to drop Dallas to 4–4. Stats

==== Scoring summary ====
- Q1 – 6:29 – Julius Jones tackled in the end zone by Lemar Marshall for a safety (0–2 WAS)
- Q1 – 1:21 – 28-yard FG run by Nick Novak (0–5 WAS)
- Q2 – 12:55 – 10 yd TD pass from Tony Romo to Terry Glenn, pass from Tony Romo to Patrick Crayton on failed 2-point conversion (6–5 DAL)
- Q2 – 5:42 – 33-yard FG by Mike Vanderjagt (9–5 DAL)
- Q2 – 2:23 – 38-yard TD run by Clinton Portis, Nick Novak extra point is good (9–12 WAS)
- Q2 – 0:03 – 30-yard FG by Mike Vanderjagt (12–12)
- Q3 – 10:17 – 4-yard TD pass from Tony Romo to Terrell Owens, Mike Vanderjagt extra point is good (19–12 DAL)
- Q4 – 14:05 – 18-yard TD pass from Mark Brunell to Chris Cooley, Nick Novak extra point is good (19–19)
- Q4 – 0:00 – 47-yard FG by Nick Novak (19–22 WAS)

=== Week 10: at Arizona Cardinals ===
Quarter	1	2	3	4	Total
Cowboys	3	10	7	7	27
Cardinals	0	3	0	7	10

at University of Phoenix Stadium, Glendale, Arizona

- Game time: 4:15 p.m. EST/3:15 p.m. CST
- Game weather: 75 °F (24 °C), sunny
- Game attendance: 63,926
- TV announcers (Fox): Sam Rosen and Tim Ryan

The Cowboys bounced back from a painful loss by beating the Cardinals, who came into the game with the league's worst record at 1–7. Tony Romo passed for 308 yards in his best game to date as a starter. Greg Ellis was also lost for the year in this game due to a torn achilles, costing the Cowboys a key contributor and one of only 2 players who could consistently rush the passer.

With the win, the Cowboys improved to 5–4.

Stats

==== Scoring summary ====
- Q1 – 0:37 – 28-yard FG by Mike Vanderjagt (3–0 DAL)
- Q2 – 8:33 – 30-yard TD pass from Tony Romo to Patrick Crayton, Mike Vanderjagt extra point is good (10–0 DAL)
- Q2 – 3:31 – 28-yard FG by Neil Rackers (10–3 DAL)
- Q2 – 0:00 – 38-yard FG by Mike Vanderjagt (13–3 DAL)
- Q3 – 5:15 – 51-yard TD pass from Tony Romo to Terrell Owens, Mike Vanderjagt extra point is good (20–3 DAL)
- Q4 – 14:17 – 5-yard TD run by Marion Barber, Mike Vanderjagt extra point is good (27–3 DAL)
- Q4 – 11:53 – 3-yard TD run by Matt Leinart, Neil Rackers extra point is good (27–10 DAL)

=== Week 11: vs. Indianapolis Colts ===
Quarter	1	2	3	4	Total
Colts	0	7	7	0	14
Cowboys	0	0	7	14	21

at Texas Stadium, Irving, Texas

- Game time: 4:15 p.m. EST/3:15 p.m. CST
- Game weather: 63 °F (17 °C), sunny
- Game attendance: 63,706
- TV announcers (CBS): Jim Nantz and Phil Simms

In what Cowboys Owner Jerry Jones said was the best win in at least eight to ten years, the Cowboys beat the previously undefeated Colts 21–14. The game was nationally televised on CBS, having been moved from 1:00 pm to 4:15 pm (EST) because of the NFL's new "flex scheduling" policy. It was the first game played between the two teams at Texas Stadium in ten years. With the rest of the NFC East losing that weekend, the Cowboys were tied with the New York Giants for first place in the NFC East, and in a tie for second place in the NFC. The Cowboys chances of winning the division, and possibly a first-round bye in the playoffs were suddenly much brighter, especially with the rival Philadelphia Eagles losing Donovan McNabb for the season.

With the win, the Cowboys improved to 6–4.

Stats

==== Scoring summary ====
- Q2 – 0:10 – 23-yard TD pass from Peyton Manning to Reggie Wayne, Adam Vinatieri extra point is good (7–0 IND)
- Q3 – 14:09 – 39-yard TD interception return by Kevin Burnett, Mike Vanderjagt extra point is good (7–7)
- Q3 – 5:09 – 4-yard TD pass from Peyton Manning to Dallas Clark, Adam Vinatieri extra point is good (14–7 IND)
- Q4 – 11:36 – 5-yard TD run by Marion Barber, Mike Vanderjagt extra point is good (14–14)
- Q4 – 6:00 – 1-yard TD run by Marion Barber, Mike Vanderjagt extra point is good (21–14 DAL)

=== Week 12: vs. Tampa Bay Buccaneers ===
Quarter	1	2	3	4	Total
Buccaneers	7	3	0	0	10
Cowboys	7	14	14	3	38

at Texas Stadium, Irving, Texas

- Game time: 4:15 p.m. EST/3:15 p.m. CST
- Game weather: 73 °F (23 °C), sunny
- Game attendance: 63,183
- TV announcers (Fox): Joe Buck, Troy Aikman, and Pam Oliver

The Cowboys slugged the Tampa Bay Buccaneers 38–10 in the annual Thanksgiving Day game. Tony Romo had his best game so far throwing for 306 yards and a near-perfect 148.9 passer rating, and he tied a team record with five touchdown passes in one game. No Cowboys quarterback had done that since Troy Aikman in the 1999 season opener (including overtime), and since Danny White in 1983 in regulation. Romo's five touchdown passes were the most ever for a Thanksgiving Day game. Stats

On 27 November 2006, the Cowboys cut kicker Mike Vanderjagt and signed veteran Martin Gramatica in his place. Vanderjagt had made only 13 of 18 field goals in the season, well below his career average.

With the win, the Cowboys improved to 7–4.

==== Scoring summary ====
- Q1 – 9:18 – 1-yard TD run by Mike Alstott, Matt Bryant extra point is good (7–0 TB)
- Q1 – 1:09 – 20-yard TD pass from Tony Romo to Terry Glenn, Mike Vanderjagt extra point is good (7–7)
- Q2 – 11:33 – 2-yard TD pass from Tony Romo to Terry Glenn, Mike Vanderjagt extra point is good (14–7 DAL)
- Q2 – 6:38 – 46-yard FG by Matt Bryant (14–10 DAL)
- Q2 – 0:30 – 1-yard TD pass from Tony Romo to Marion Barber, Mike Vanderjagt extra point is good (21–10 DAL)
- Q3 – 9:55 – 2-yard TD pass from Tony Romo to Marion Barber, Mike Vanderjagt extra point is good (28–10 DAL)
- Q3 – 6:30 – 7-yard TD pass from Tony Romo to Terrell Owens, Mike Vanderjagt extra point is good (35–10 DAL)
- Q4 – 10:00 – 22-yard FG by Mike Vanderjagt (38–10 DAL)

=== Week 13: at New York Giants ===
Quarter	1	2	3	4	Total
Cowboys	7	3	3	10	23
Giants	7	0	3	10	20

at Giants Stadium, East Rutherford, New Jersey

- Game time: 4:15 p.m. EST/3:15 p.m. CST
- Game weather: 45 °F (7 °C), sunny (wind chill was 38 °F (3 °C))
- Game attendance: 78,666
- TV announcers (Fox): Joe Buck, Troy Aikman, and Pam Oliver

The Cowboys extended their winning streak to four straight wins in a close game when newly signed place kicker Martin Gramatica kicked a 46-yard field goal with one second remaining. The Giants lost their fourth straight game and the Cowboys secured a two-game lead over the Giants.

With the win, the Cowboys improved to 8–4.

Stats

This game was moved from the originally scheduled time at 1:00 pm to 4:15 pm (EST) because of the NFL's new "flex scheduling" policy.

==== Scoring summary ====
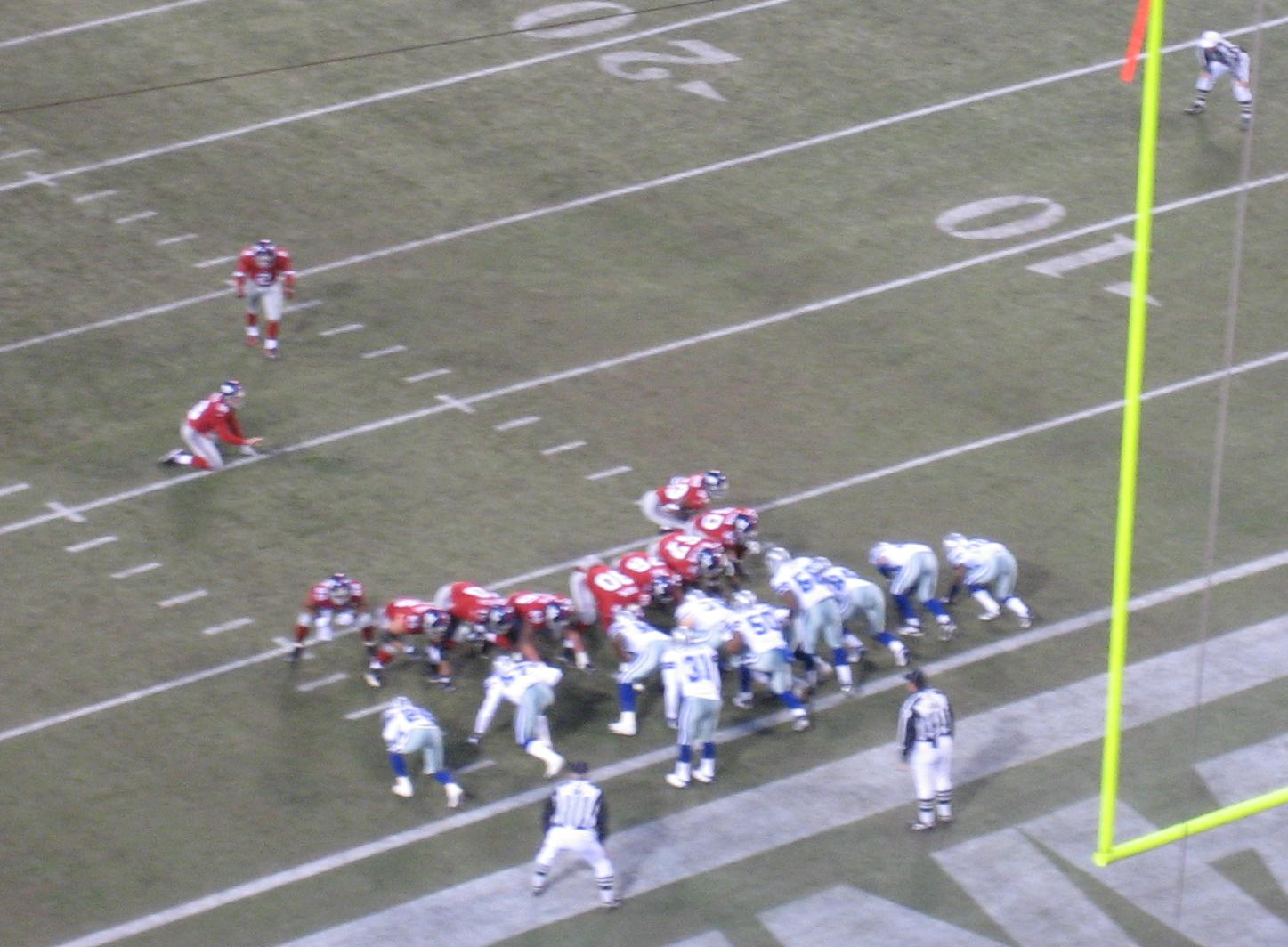
The Giants attempt an extra point, week 13

- Q1 – 4:39 – 17-yard TD pass from Eli Manning to Jeremy Shockey (7–0 NYG)
- Q1 – 1:28 – 1-yard TD run by Marion Barber, Martin Gramatica extra point is good (7–7)
- Q2 – 0:01 – 41-yard FG by Martin Gramatica (10–7 DAL)
- Q3 – 4:32 – 23-yard FG by Jay Feely (10–10)
- Q3 – 0:05 – 35-yard FG by Martin Gramatica (13–10 DAL)
- Q4 – 9:44 – 22-yard FG by Jay Feely (13–13)
- Q4 – 3:33 – 7-yard TD run by Marion Barber, Martin Gramatica extra point is good (20–13 DAL)
- Q4 – 1:06 – 5-yard TD pass from Eli Manning to Plaxico Burress (20–20)
- Q4 – 0:01 – 46-yard FG by Martin Gramatica (23–20 DAL)

=== Week 14: vs. New Orleans Saints ===
Quarter	1	2	3	4	Total
Saints	0	21	21	0	42
Cowboys	7	0	10	0	17

at Texas Stadium, Irving, Texas

- Game time: 8:15 p.m. EST/7:15 p.m. CST
- Game weather: 48 °F (9 °C), Cloudy
- Game attendance: 63,722
- Referee: Gerald Austin
- TV announcers (NBC): Al Michaels and John Madden

On November 27, the NFL announced that the game was moved to 8:15 pm. EST (7:15 pm. CST) to be nationally televised on NBC Sunday Night Football.

New Orleans Head Coach and former Dallas Offensive Coordinator, as well as Passing Coordinator, Sean Payton thoroughly dissected the Cowboys defense by showcasing the talents of Drew Brees, Reggie Bush, and Deuce McAllister. Perhaps more surprising was the performance of Mike Karney. Previously an unknown fullback who had never had a touchdown in his 43 NFL games, Karney scored a hat trick (three touchdowns). Brees topped 4,000 season passing yards for the first time in his career, having 26 completions for 38 attempts and 384 yards and five touchdowns. Deuce McCallister and Reggie Bush both proved their worth with 135 and 162 all-purpose yards, respectively. Payton was even feeling so confident as to attempt an onside kick early in the third quarter, further demoralizing the Cowboys and increasing momentum for the Saints when they recovered it. With 3 minutes left in the game and the ball deep in Cowboys territory, Payton's Saints went to kneeling, either to let Parcells keep some of his pride intact, or to make a statement.

The Cowboys had one of the worst games of their season. Payton's defense never gave them a chance to get into a rhythm, and Tony Romo threw for 16 completions of 33 attempts for 249 yards for a single touchdown and a pair of interceptions. The Cowboys started out promising, stopping the Saints' offense and Julius Jones responding with a career record 77-yard touchdown run. Though after that play, nothing seemed to go right. Gramatica missed another crucial field goal, soaring wide right, and the only other touchdown came from a fourth-down pass to Terrell Owens that could have been an interception had cornerback Fred Thomas not had a cast on his hand.

New Orleans defeated Dallas 42–17, snapping Dallas' four-game winning streak and dropping them to 8–5 while improving their own record to 9–4.

Stats

==== Scoring summary ====
- Q1 – 12:06 – 77-yard TD run by Julius Jones (0–7 DAL) (Martin Gramatica kick)
- Q2 – 14:53 – 2-yard TD run by Mike Karney (7–7), (John Carney kick)
- Q2 – 10:19 – 3-yard TD pass from Drew Brees to Mike Karney (14–7 NO) (John Carney kick)
- Q2 – 0:44 – 27-yard TD pass from Drew Brees to Jamal Jones (21–7 NO) (John Carney kick)
- Q3 – 11:26 – 24-yard FG by Martin Gramatica (21–10, NO)
- Q3 – 9:59 – 61-yard TD pass from Drew Brees to Reggie Bush (28–10 NO) (John Carney kick)
- Q3 – 7:46 – 34-yard TD pass from Tony Romo to Terrell Owens (28–17 NO) (Martin Gramatica kick)
- Q3 – 5:16 – 6-yard TD pass from Drew Brees to Mike Karney (35–17 NO) (John Carney kick)
- Q3 – 3:47 – 42-yard TD pass from Drew Brees to Devery Henderson (42–17 NO) (John Carney kick)

=== Week 15: at Atlanta Falcons ===
Quarter	1	2	3	4	Total
Cowboys	7	14	10	7	38
Falcons	0	21	7	0	28

at Georgia Dome, Atlanta

- Game time: 8:00 p.m. EST/7:00 p.m. CST
- Game weather: Indoors
- Game attendance: 71,102
- TV announcers (NFL Network): Bryant Gumbel and Dick Vermeil (with second half fill-in work from Marshall Faulk and Deion Sanders)

Hoping to rebound from their Sunday night home loss to the Saints, the Cowboys flew to the Georgia Dome for a Saturday night fight with the Atlanta Falcons. In the first quarter, Dallas took an early lead with QB Tony Romo completed a 7-yard TD pass to WR Terrell Owens for the only score of the period. In the second quarter, the Cowboys increased its lead as on the very first play, OLB DeMarcus Ware returned an interception 41 yards for a touchdown. However, the Falcons started to fight back with QB Michael Vick completing a 1-yard TD pass to FB Justin Griffith and a 9-yard TD pass to WR Michael Jenkins. Fortunately, the 'Boys struck back with Romo and Owens hooking up with each other again with a 51-yard TD pass. Yet again, Atlanta fought back with Vick completing an 8-yard TD pass to WR Ashley Lelie. In the third quarter, Dallas temporarily fell behind with Vick completing 5-yard TD pass to Griffith. Afterwards, the Cowboys regained control with kicker Martin Gramatica's 48-yard field goal and RB Marion Barber 9-yard TD run. In the fourth quarter, Barber helped the Cowboys wrap the game up with a 3-yard TD run. With the win, the 'Boys improved to 9–5 and put themselves in position to clinch a playoff berth following the day.

Stats

==== Scoring summary ====
- Q1 – 7-yard TD pass from Tony Romo to Terrell Owens (7–0 DAL) (Martin Gramatica kick)
- Q2 – 14:50 – 41-yard TD interception return by DeMarcus Ware (14–0 DAL) (Martin Gramatica kick)
- Q2 – 11:11 – 1-yard TD pass from Michael Vick to Justin Griffith (14–7 DAL) (Morten Andersen kick)
- Q2 – 6:30 – 9-yard TD pass from Michael Vick to Michael Jenkins (14–14) (Morten Andersen kick)
- Q2 – 3:08 – 51-yard TD pass from Tony Romo to Terrell Owens (21–14 DAL) (Martin Gramatica kick)
- Q2 – 0:11 – 8-yard TD pass from Michael Vick to Ashley Lelie (21–21) (Morten Andersen kick)
- Q3 – 11:09 – 5-yard TD pass from Michael Vick to Justin Griffith (28–21 ATL) (Morten Andersen kick)
- Q3 – 7:17 – 48-yard FG by Martin Gramatica (28–24 ATL)
- Q3 – 2:32 – 9-yard TD run by Marion Barber (31–28 DAL) (Martin Gramatica kick)
- Q4 – 2:18 – 3-yard TD run by Marion Barber (38–28 DAL) (Martin Gramatica kick)

=== Week 16: vs. Philadelphia Eagles ===
Quarter	1	2	3	4	Total
Eagles	7	6	3	7	23
Cowboys	0	7	0	0	7

at Texas Stadium, Irving, Texas

- Game time: 5:00 p.m. EST/4:00 p.m. CST
- Game weather: 50 °F (10 °C), Clear
- Game attendance: 62,839
- TV announcers (NBC): Al Michaels and John Madden

Following a Saturday victory over the Falcons, the Cowboys returned home, donned their 1960s throwbacks again, and prepared for an NFC East rematch on Christmas Day with the Philadelphia Eagles. The Cowboys had a chance to clinch the NFC East for the first time since 1998 with a victory. In the first quarter, the 'Boys trailed early with QB Jeff Garcia completing a 25-yard TD pass to TE Matt Schobel for the only score of the period. In the second quarter, Philadelphia's lead increased with kicker David Akers nailing a 25-yard field goal. Dallas would get its only score of the game with QB Tony Romo completing a 14-yard TD pass to WR Terrell Owens. Afterwards, the Eagles wrapped up the half with Akers kicking a 45-yard field goal. In the third quarter, Philly's lead increased with Akers' 21-yard field goal for the only score of the period. In the fourth quarter, Dallas fell with RB Correll Buckhalter's 1-yard TD run. While the Eagles clinched a playoff berth, the loss for Dallas would have significant ramifications entering week 17 as not only did they fail to clinch the NFC East, they were officially out of contention for a first-round bye and no longer controlled their destiny in winning the NFC East as they slipped behind Philadelphia in the standings.

Stats

==== Scoring summary ====
- Q1 – 4:00 – 25-yard TD from Jeff Garcia to Matt Schobel (7–0 PHI) (David Akers kick)
- Q2 – 5:16 – 25-yard FG by David Akers (10–0 PHI)
- Q2 – 0:36 – 14-yard TD pass from Tony Romo to Terrell Owens (10–7 PHI) (Martin Gramatica kick)
- Q2 – 0:00 – 45-yard FG by David Akers (13–7 PHI)
- Q3 – 12:14 – 21-yard FG by David Akers (16–7 PHI)
- Q4 – 6:54 – 1-yard TD run by Correll Buckhalter (23–7 PHI) (David Akers kick)

=== Week 17: vs. Detroit Lions ===
Quarter	1	2	3	4	Total
Lions	13	7	10	9	39
Cowboys	0	14	10	7	31

at Texas Stadium, Irving, Texas

- Game time: 1:00 p.m. EST/12:00 p.m. CST
- Game weather: 45 °F (7 °C), Partly cloudy
- Game attendance: 63,008
- Referee: Gene Steratore
- TV announcers (Fox): Kenny Albert and Brian Baldinger

Following their loss to the Eagles, the Cowboys wrapped up the regular season at home against the 2–13 Detroit Lions. In the first quarter, Dallas shockingly trailed early as Lions kicker Jason Hanson nailed a 33-yard and a 25-yard field goal, while QB Jon Kitna completed a 20-yard TD pass to WR Roy Williams. In the second quarter, the Cowboys took the lead with RB Marion Barber getting a 1-yard TD run, while QB Tony Romo completed a 6-yard TD pass to WR Patrick Crayton. However, Detroit regained its lead with Kitna and Williams hooking up with each other again on a 15-yard TD pass. In the third quarter, the back-and-forth battle began with Dallas CB Terence Newman returning a punt 56 yards for a touchdown. However, the Lions regained the lead with Hanson kicking a 26-yard field goal, while Kitna completed a 13-yard TD pass to WR Mike Furrey. Afterwards, Cowboys kicker Martin Gramatica helped Dallas with a 39-yard field goal. In the fourth quarter, the Cowboys took the lead with Romo completing a 56-yard TD pass to WR Terrell Owens. However, Detroit regained the lead with Kitna completing a 21-yard TD pass to WR Mike Williams and Hanson kicking a 23-yard field goal. Late in the game, Dallas had one last chance to take back the lead, but on 4th & Goal, Romo's run towards the endzone was stopped one yard short. With the shocking loss, the Cowboys ended the regular season at 9–7 and with the NFC's #5 seed.

Stats

==== Scoring summary ====
- Q1 – 11:08 – 33-yard FG by Jason Hanson (3–0 DET)
- Q1 – 5:13 – 25-yard FG by Jason Hanson (6–0 DET)
- Q1 – 2:37 – 20-yard TD pass from Jon Kitna to Roy Williams, Jason Hanson extra point is good (13–0 DET)
- Q2 – 11:38 – 1-yard TD run by Marion Barber, Martin Gramatica extra point is good (13–7 DET)
- Q2 – 2:48 – 6-yard TD pass from Tony Romo to Patrick Crayton, Martin Gramatica extra point is good (14–13 DAL)
- Q2 – 0:02 – 15-yard TD pass from Jon Kitna to Roy Williams, Jason Hanson extra point is good (20–14 DET)
- Q3 – 12:16 – 56-yard TD punt return by Terence Newman, Martin Gramatica extra point is good (21–20 DAL)
- Q3 – 6:06 – 26-yard FG by Jason Hanson (23–21 DET)
- Q3 – 4:16 – 13-yard TD pass from Jon Kitna to Mike Furrey, Jason Hanson extra point is good (30–21 DET)
- Q3 – 0:04 – 39-yard FG by Martin Gramatica (30–24 DET)
- Q4 – 8:09 – 56-yard TD pass from Tony Romo to Terrell Owens, Martin Gramatica extra point is good (31–30 DAL)
- Q4 – 4:24 – 21-yard TD pass from Jon Kitna to Mike Williams, failed 2 pt. conversion from Jon Kitna to Mike Williams (36–31 DET)
- Q4 – 2:58 – 23-yard FG by Jason Hanson (39–31 DET)

== Playoffs ==
The Cowboys secured a playoff berth after the New York Jets and Pittsburgh Steelers each got a victory. Their season ended after a 21–20 loss.

=== NFC Wild-Card Playoffs: at Seattle Seahawks ===
Quarter	1	2	3	4	Total
Cowboys	3	7	7	3	20
Seahawks	3	3	7	8	21

- Game time: 8:00 pm EST/5:00 pm PST; Saturday, January 6, 2007
- Game weather: 44 °F (7 °C), Overcast
- Game attendance: 68,058
- TV announcers (NBC): Al Michaels, John Madden and Andrea Kremer

Entering the NFC playoffs as the fifth-seed, the Cowboys began their playoff run at Qwest Field against the fourth-seeded Seattle Seahawks. In the first quarter, both teams started off even as Seahawks kicker Josh Brown nailed a 23-yard field goal, while Martín Gramática helped Dallas with a 50-yard field goal. In the second quarter, Seattle retook the lead with Brown kicking a 30-yard field goal. Dallas got the lead before halftime as QB Tony Romo completed a 13-yard TD pass to WR Patrick Crayton. In the third quarter, the Seahawks retook the lead as QB Matt Hasselbeck completed a 15-yard TD pass to TE Jerramy Stevens. Following Seattle's TD drive, the Cowboys retook the lead with rookie WR Miles Austin returning a kickoff 93 yards for a touchdown. In the fourth quarter, Dallas increased its lead with Gramatica kicking a 29-yard field goal. However, the Seahawks came back to retake the lead with a safety coming off a Terry Glenn fumble from Seattle CB Kelly Jennings, along with Hasselbeck completing a 37-yard TD pass to Stevens (followed up with a failed 2-point conversion). Dallas managed to put themselves in a position to retake the lead, but on the 19-yard field goal try Romo botched the hold. He picked up the loose ball and attempted to run with it, but was tackled at Seattle's two-yard line by Jordan Babineaux thus turning the ball over on downs. On the ensuing possession, Hasselbeck then handed the ball off four times before the Seahawks were forced to punt. With only 2 seconds left, Romo threw a Hail Mary pass to the Seattle end zone that fell incomplete, ending the Cowboys' season and leaving the franchise still without a playoff win since 1996. Stats

With the loss, Dallas ended its season with three-straight losses and an overall record of 9–8.

==== Scoring summary ====
- Q1 – 11:13 – 23-yard FG by Josh Brown (3–0 SEA)
- Q1 – 4:50 – 50-yard FG by Martín Gramática (3–3)
- Q2 – 5:14 – 30-yard FG by Josh Brown (6–3 SEA)
- Q2 – 0:11 – 13-yard TD pass from Tony Romo to Patrick Crayton, Martín Gramática extra point is good (10–6 DAL)
- Q3 – 6:08 – 15-yard TD pass from Matt Hasselbeck to Jerramy Stevens, Josh Brown extra point is good (13–10 SEA)
- Q3 – 5:57 – 93-yard TD kickoff return by Miles Austin, Martín Gramática extra point is good (17–13 DAL)
- Q4 – 10:15 – 29-yard FG by Martin Gramatica (20–13 DAL)
- Q4 – 6:32 – Safety (20–15 DAL)
- Q4 – 4:24 – 37-yard TD pass from Matt Hasselbeck to Jerramy Stevens, failed 2 pt. conversion from Matt Hasselbeck to Deion Branch (21–20 SEA)

== Coaching staff ==
Dallas Cowboys 2006 coaching staff
Front office: Owner/general manager – Jerry Jones; Executive vp – Stephen Jones; Head coaches: Head coach – Bill Parcells; Offensive coaches: Quarterbacks – Chris Palmer; Running backs – Anthony Lynn; Wide receivers/passing game coordinator – Todd Haley; Tight ends – Freddie Kitchens; Offensive line/running game coordinator – Tony Sparano; Offensive assistant – David Lee	Defensive coaches: Defensive coordinator – Mike Zimmer; Defensive line – Kacy Rodgers; Linebackers – Paul Pasqualoni; Inside linebackers – Vincent Brown; Secondary – Todd Bowles; Assistant secondary – Mike MacIntyre; Special teams coaches: Special teams – Bruce DeHaven; Strength and conditioning: Strength and conditioning – Joe Juraszek

== Rosters ==
=== Opening training camp roster ===
Dallas Cowboys 2006 opening training camp roster
Quarterbacks: 11 Drew Bledsoe; 7 Drew Henson; 5 Jeff Mroz; 9 Tony Romo; Running backs: 24 Marion Barber III; 21 Julius Jones; 27 Keylon Kincade; 39 Lousaka Polite FB; 30 Demetris Summers; 28 Tyson Thompson; Wide receivers: 14 Miles Austin; 18 Terrance Copper; 84 Patrick Crayton; 83 Terry Glenn; 6 Skyler Green; 17 Sam Hurd; 10 Ahmad Merritt; 81 Terrell Owens; 85 Jamaica Rector; 87 J. R. Tolver; Tight ends: 89 Tony Curtis; 47 Anthony Fasano; 86 Ryan Hannam; 80 Sean Ryan; 82 Jason Witten	Offensive linemen: 76 Flozell Adams T; 78 D'Anthony Batiste G; 75 Marc Colombo T; 69 Jason Fabini T; 65 Andre Gurode C; 52 Al Johnson C; 63 Kyle Kosier G; 77 Pat McQuistan T; 72 Stephen Peterman G; 79 Rob Petitti T; 71 Cory Procter G/C; 62 Marco Rivera G; 68 Dennis Roland T; 64 Shannon Snell G; 61 Matt Tarullo G; 70 E. J. Whitley T; Defensive linemen: 72 Stephen Bowen DE; 99 Chris Canty DE; 93 Kenyon Coleman DE; 98 Greg Ellis DE; 95 Jason Ferguson NT; 97 Jason Hatcher DE; 74 Vontrell Jamison DE; 92 Thomas Johnson NT; 66 Jay Ratliff DE/NT; 96 Marcus Spears DE; 60 Montavious Stanley NT; 67 Samuel Taulealea NT	Linebackers: 50 Akin Ayodele ILB; 59 Rocky Boiman OLB; 48 Carl-Johan Björk ILB ^{Int'l}; 57 Kevin Burnett ILB; 54 Bobby Carpenter OLB/ILB; 55 Ryan Fowler ILB; 53 Junior Glymph OLB; 44 J. J. Horne OLB; 46 Oliver Hoyte ILB/FB; 56 Bradie James ILB; 90 Eric Ogbogu OLB; 43 Kai Parham OLB/ILB; 45 John Saldi OLB; 58 Scott Shanle ILB; 51 Al Singleton OLB; 94 DeMarcus Ware OLB; Defensive backs: 40 Justin Beriault FS; 36 Quincy Butler CB; 32 Marcus Coleman SS; 29 Keith Davis FS; 37 Abram Elam SS; 26 Aaron Glenn CB; 42 Anthony Henry CB; 33 Nate Jones CB; 41 Terence Newman CB; 23 Byron Parker CB; 20 Willie Pile FS; 35 Jacques Reeves CB; 38 Lynn Scott SS; 25 Pat Watkins FS; 34 Lenny Williams CB; 31 Roy Williams SS; Special teams: 91 L. P. Ladouceur LS; 1 Mat McBriar P; 4 Shaun Suisham K; 13 Mike Vanderjagt K	Reserve lists: 88 Brett Pierce TE (IR); rookies in italics 90 active, 1 inactive

=== Week one roster ===
Dallas Cowboys 2006 week one roster
Quarterbacks: 11 Drew Bledsoe; 9 Tony Romo; Running backs: 24 Marion Barber III; 46 Oliver Hoyte FB/ILB; 21 Julius Jones; 39 Lousaka Polite FB; 28 Tyson Thompson; Wide receivers: 14 Miles Austin; 84 Patrick Crayton; 83 Terry Glenn; 17 Sam Hurd; 81 Terrell Owens; 85 Jamaica Rector; Tight ends: 80 Anthony Fasano; 86 Ryan Hannam; 82 Jason Witten	Offensive linemen: 76 Flozell Adams T; 75 Marc Colombo T; 69 Jason Fabini T; 65 Andre Gurode C; 52 Al Johnson C; 63 Kyle Kosier G; 77 Pat McQuistan T; 71 Cory Procter G/C; 62 Marco Rivera G; Defensive linemen: 99 Chris Canty DE; 93 Kenyon Coleman DE; 95 Jason Ferguson NT; 97 Jason Hatcher DE; 92 Thomas Johnson NT; 90 Jay Ratliff DE/NT; 96 Marcus Spears DE	Linebackers: 50 Akin Ayodele ILB; 57 Kevin Burnett ILB; 98 Greg Ellis OLB/DE; 55 Ryan Fowler ILB; 56 Bradie James ILB; 51 Al Singleton OLB; 94 DeMarcus Ware OLB; 54 Bobby Carpenter OLB/ILB; Defensive backs: 32 Marcus Coleman FS; 29 Keith Davis FS; 37 Abram Elam SS; 26 Aaron Glenn CB; 42 Anthony Henry CB; 41 Terence Newman CB; 35 Jacques Reeves CB; 25 Pat Watkins FS; 31 Roy Williams SS; Special teams: 91 L. P. Ladouceur LS; 1 Mat McBriar P; 4 Shaun Suisham K; 13 Mike Vanderjagt K	Reserve lists: 88 Brett Pierce TE (IR); 70 E. J. Whitley OT (IR); Practice squad: 16 Matt Baker QB; 78 D'Anthony Batiste G; 19 Damarius Bilbo WR; 48 Carl-Johan Björk ILB ^{Int'l}; 72 Stephen Bowen DE; 36 Quincy Butler CB; 87 Jerome Collins TE; 89 Tony Curtis TE; 10 Skyler Green WR; rookies in italics 53 active, 2 inactive, 9 PS

=== Final roster ===
Dallas Cowboys 2006 final roster
Quarterbacks: 11 Drew Bledsoe; 9 Tony Romo; Running backs: 24 Marion Barber; 46 Oliver Hoyte FB; 21 Julius Jones; 39 Lousaka Polite FB; Wide receivers: 14 Miles Austin KR; 84 Patrick Crayton PR; 83 Terry Glenn; 17 Sam Hurd; 81 Terrell Owens; Tight ends: 80 Anthony Fasano; 82 Jason Witten	Offensive linemen: 76 Flozell Adams T; 67 Joe Berger G; 75 Marc Colombo T; 69 Jason Fabini T; 65 Andre Gurode C; 52 Al Johnson C; 63 Kyle Kosier G; 77 Pat McQuistan T; 71 Cory Procter C/G; 62 Marco Rivera G; Defensive linemen: 72 Stephen Bowen DE; 99 Chris Canty DE; 93 Kenyon Coleman DE; 95 Jason Ferguson NT; 92 Junior Glymph DE; 97 Jason Hatcher DE; 90 Jay Ratliff NT; 96 Marcus Spears DE; 60 Montavious Stanley NT	Linebackers: 50 Akin Ayodele ILB; 57 Kevin Burnett ILB/OLB; 54 Bobby Carpenter OLB; 55 Ryan Fowler ILB; 56 Bradie James ILB; 51 Al Singleton OLB; 94 DeMarcus Ware OLB; Defensive backs: 36 Quincy Butler CB; 29 Keith Davis FS; 37 Abram Elam SS; 26 Aaron Glenn CB/FS; 42 Anthony Henry CB; 33 Nate Jones CB; 41 Terence Newman CB/PR; 34 Tony Parrish SS; 35 Jacques Reeves CB/S; 25 Pat Watkins FS; 31 Roy Williams SS; Special teams: 7 Martin Gramatica K; 91 L. P. Ladouceur LS; 1 Mat McBriar P	Reserve lists: 98 Greg Ellis LB (IR); 86 Ryan Hannam TE (IR); 88 Brett Pierce TE (IR); 28 Tyson Thompson RB/KR (IR); 70 E. J. Whitley G (IR); Practice squad: 16 Matt Baker QB; 19 Damarius Bilbo S; 48 Carl-Johan Björk LB ^{Int'l}; 89 Tony Curtis TE; 27 Keylon Kincade RB; 3 Carlos Martínez K; 85 Jamaica Rector WR; 87 Andy Thorn TE; 15 Jerheme Urban WR; rookies in italics 53 active, 5 inactive, 9 practice squad

== Other information ==
- The Cowboys had nine starting quarterbacks in the six seasons after Troy Aikman retired in 2000. They were Quincy Carter (started 32 games), Vinny Testaverde (started 15), Ryan Leaf (3), Anthony Wright (3), Clint Stoerner (2 games), Chad Hutchinson (9), Drew Henson (1 game), Drew Bledsoe (22), and then Tony Romo.
- The Cowboys had not had a 1,000-yard rusher since Emmitt Smith had 1,021 yards in 2001. Herschel Walker was the last running back before Smith to rush for over 1,000 yards, in 1988. Julius Jones snapped that streak of futility for Dallas by posting 1,084 yards in 2006. In the previous season, Jones fell just short of the mark (993).
- DeMarcus Ware had 11.5 sacks in 2006, the most in team history by a linebacker. He broke that record in 2007 with 14 sacks, and then he broke it again in 2008 with a league-leading 20.

== Publications ==
- The Football Encyclopedia ISBN 0-312-11435-4
- Total Football ISBN 0-06-270170-3
- Cowboys Have Always Been My Heroes ISBN 0-446-51950-2
