= Tyson Thompson =

American football player (born 1981)

No. 28
- Position: Running back

Personal information
- Born: May 21, 1981 (age 45); Irving, Texas, U.S.
- Listed height: 6 ft 1 in (1.85 m)
- Listed weight: 220 lb (100 kg)

Career information
- High school: Irving
- College: San Jose State
- NFL draft: 2005: undrafted

Career history
- Dallas Cowboys (2005–2007); Las Vegas Locomotives (2009)*; Tri-Cities Fever (2010)
- * Offseason or practice squad member only

Career NFL statistics
- Rushing attempts: 73
- Rushing yards: 266
- Rushing touchdowns: 1
- Receptions: 3
- Receiving yards: 16
- Return yards: 2,416
- Stats at Pro Football Reference

Tyson Calvin Thompson (born May 21, 1981) is an American former professional football player who was a running back and return specialist for the Dallas Cowboys of the National Football League (NFL). He played college football for the San Jose State Spartans.

== Early life ==
Thompson attended Irving High School. As a junior in 1998, he rushed for 525 yards in a single game against L. D. Bell High School (Hurst, Texas), third most in Texas high school history and the most ever by a runner in UIL Class 5A, which at that time housed the state's largest schools.

As a senior, he rushed for 2,418 yards on 358 carries and was a semi-finalist for the 1999 Texas Class 5A Player of the Year award.

== College career ==
Thompson enrolled at Garden City Community College in Garden City, Kansas. In two seasons he saw limited playing time but still recorded 1,063 rushing yards on 159 carries and 12 touchdowns. In his final game, he rushed 25 times for 323 yards and 3 touchdowns against nationally ranked Glendale Community College. He transferred after his sophomore season to San Jose State University.

He closed his collegiate career at San Jose State University, playing in all 11 games with eight starts at running back while also seeing action as a kick returner. He posted 811 rushing yards (led the team) and his 5 touchdowns (third on the team). He declared for the NFL draft after his junior season.

== Professional career ==
=== Dallas Cowboys ===
Thompson was not selected in the 2005 NFL draft due to concerns about his lack of experience at the Division I level. He impressed the Cowboys with his speed during a tryout at their practice facilities in Valley Ranch and was signed as an undrafted free agent, to compete for the reserve running back and kick returner positions.

After making the team, although he was third on the running back depth chart (behind Julius Jones and Marion Barber), a Jones injury allowed him to rush 20 times for 75 yards against the Philadelphia Eagles and was named NFL Rookie of the Week (Week 5). He finished the season with team records for kickoff returns (57) and kickoff return yardage (1,399), while ranking ninth in the NFL with a 24.5-yard average.

His 2006 season ended when he broke his left ankle in the seventh game against the Carolina Panthers, after being tackled out of bounds on a kickoff return. In 2007, he was declared inactive in 9 games and was not re-signed at the end of the year, after losing his returner job to Miles Austin.

=== Las Vegas Locomotives ===
In 2009, Thompson was selected in the UFL Premiere Season Draft by the Las Vegas Locomotives of the United Football League. He was signed on August 5, but was released before the start of the season.

=== Tri-Cities Fever ===
On January 29, 2010, he signed with the Tri-Cities Fever of the Indoor Football League. He left during the season after signing with a team in the United Football League.
