= Lousaka Polite =

American football player (born 1981)

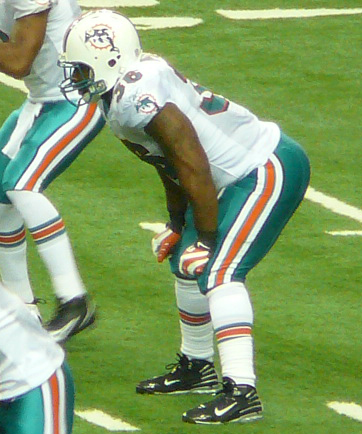
- Polite with the Miami Dolphins in 2009

No. 36, 39, 45
- Position: Fullback

Personal information
- Born: September 14, 1981 (age 45); North Braddock, Pennsylvania, U.S.
- Listed height: 6 ft 0 in (1.83 m)
- Listed weight: 245 lb (111 kg)

Career information
- High school: Woodland Hills (PA)
- College: Pittsburgh
- NFL draft: 2004: undrafted

Career history
- Dallas Cowboys (2004–2006); Chicago Bears (2007); Miami Dolphins (2008–2010); New England Patriots (2011); Atlanta Falcons (2012)

Career NFL statistics
- Games played: 82
- Rushing attempts: 95
- Rushing yards: 296
- Rushing touchdowns: 1
- Receptions: 42
- Receiving yards: 241
- Receiving touchdowns: 1
- Stats at Pro Football Reference

Lousaka Romon Polite (born September 14, 1981) is an American former professional football player who was a fullback in the National Football League (NFL) for the Dallas Cowboys, Chicago Bears, Miami Dolphins, New England Patriots, and Atlanta Falcons. He played college football for the Pittsburgh Panthers.

== Early life ==
Polite attended Woodland Hills High School, where he played at fullback and inside linebacker. As a senior, he posted 116 carries for 1,022 yards (8.8-yard average), 20 touchdowns and 83 tackles, while earning All-conference honors.

He also practiced track, where he was a two-time state finalist in the javelin throw.

== College career ==
Polite accepted a football scholarship from the University of Pittsburgh. As a redshirt freshman, he was named the starter at fullback, tallying 36 carries for 109 yards, 16 receptions for 118 yards and one touchdown.

As a sophomore, he collected 22 carries for 77 yards, 9 receptions for 69 yards and one touchdown. As a junior, he registered 52 carries for 211 yards, 9 receptions for 76 yards and 2 touchdowns. As a senior, he rushed for 258 yards on 70 carries, caught 25 passed for 222 yards and scored 2 touchdowns.

He became the first three-year captain in school history and was a four-year starter at fullback. He also saw action at running back, but had minimal success at that position.

== Professional career ==
=== Dallas Cowboys ===
Polite was signed as an undrafted free agent by the Dallas Cowboys after the 2004 NFL draft. He was waived before the start of the season and signed to the practice squad on November 3. On December 28, he was promoted to the active roster after fullback Richie Anderson was placed on the injured reserve list with a neck injury.

In 2005, he took over the starting fullback position after Darian Barnes was waived injured with a sprained ankle. In 2006, he was released on October 20 and re-signed on November 2. He was cut on November 7 and re-signed on November 15.

He spent three years with the team, contributing mostly with his blocking at fullback, while registering 28 rushing yards and 97 receiving yards on 12 receptions. He was waived before the start of the 2007 season, with the team deciding to keep rookie Deon Anderson and second-year player Oliver Hoyte.

=== Chicago Bears ===
In 2007, Polite signed with the Chicago Bears. He played in 5 games and had 2 tackles on special teams, but did not see any action on the offense. He was cut on August 30, 2008.

=== Miami Dolphins ===
On October 16, 2008, he signed as a free agent with the Miami Dolphins. The move reunited him with various coaches and front office personnel from the Cowboys, including Bill Parcells who was the Cowboys' head coach in 2004. He saw action on short yardage situations. In 2008, he had 83 yards rushing on 23 attempts, and 51 yards on 11 receptions. He also gained 11 first downs in 12 attempts on 3rd or 4th and one.

In 2009, he played in all 16 games for the first time in his career, while blocking for Ricky Williams. That year, he racked up 123 yards rushing, his career high, on 37 attempts. He also converted all 16 attempts on 3rd or 4th and one.

In 2010, he played in all 16 games for the second year in a row. He had 62 yards rushing on 26 attempts and also a rushing touchdown, what was the first of his career. He did not contribute much in the passing game having only 61 yards on 12 receptions, however 12 receptions was his career high. He was 14 of 15 in 3rd or 4th and one situations. He was released on September 3, 2011.

=== New England Patriots ===
On December 27, 2011, he was signed as free agent by the New England Patriots to improve their roster depth. He appeared in the season finale, all three postseason games and in Super Bowl XLVI. He was released on March 26, 2012.

=== Atlanta Falcons ===
On August 11, 2012, he signed with the Atlanta Falcons. He was released on November 7, after he was replaced with Mike Cox.

=== Career statistics ===
Rushing Stats

Year	Att	Yrd	Avg	Td
2010	26	62	2.4	1
2009	37	124	3.3	0
2008	23	86	3.7	0
2007	0	0	0	0
2006	7	18	2.6	0
2005	2	8	4.0	0
2004	0	0	0	0
Total	95	296	3.1	1

Receiving

Year	Rec	Yrd	Avg	Td
2010	12	61	5.1	0
2009	11	51	4.6	0
2008	6	24	4.0	0
2007	0	0	0	0
2006	2	21	10.5	0
2005	9	72	8.0	1
2004	1	4	4.0	0
Total	41	233	5.7	1

== Personal life ==
In 2016, Polite earned a Master of Business Administration degree from the University of Miami Business School.
