= Jeremiah Ratliff =

American football player (born 1981)

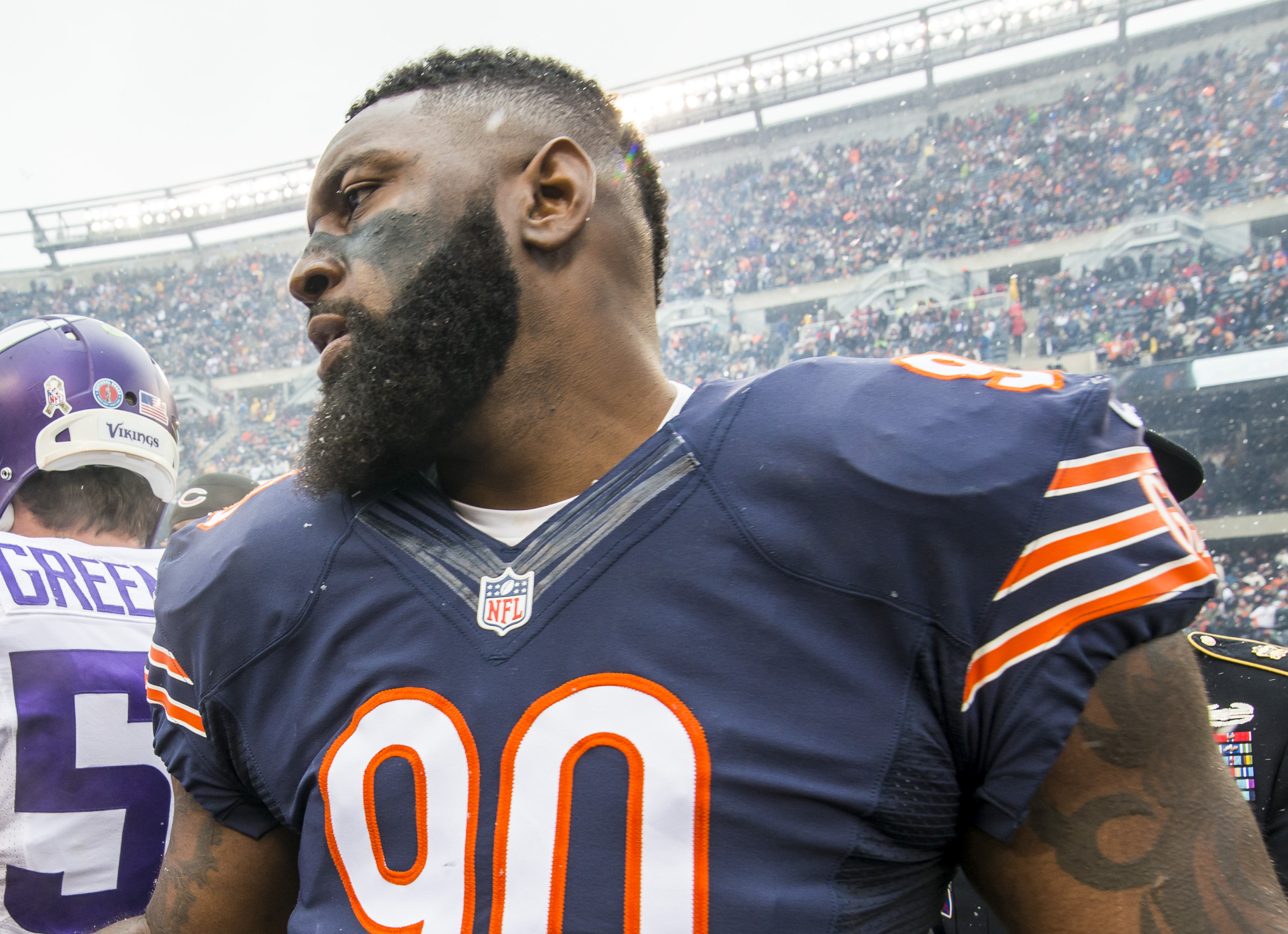
- Ratliff with the Chicago Bears in 2014

No. 66, 90, 96
- Position: Nose tackle

Personal information
- Born: August 29, 1981 (age 45); St. Petersburg, Florida, U.S.
- Listed height: 6 ft 4 in (1.93 m)
- Listed weight: 303 lb (137 kg)

Career information
- High school: Lowndes (Valdosta, Georgia)
- College: Auburn (2000–2004)
- NFL draft: 2005: 7th round, 224th overall pick

Career history
- Dallas Cowboys (2005–2013); Chicago Bears (2013–2015)

Awards and highlights
- 2× First-team All-Pro (2008, 2009); 4× Pro Bowl (2008–2011)

Career NFL statistics
- Total tackles: 285
- Sacks: 35.0
- Forced fumbles: 4
- Fumble recoveries: 13
- Stats at Pro Football Reference

Jeremiah Jerome Ratliff (born August 29, 1981), formerly known as Jay Ratliff, is an American former professional football player who was a nose tackle in the National Football League (NFL) for the Dallas Cowboys and Chicago Bears. He played college football for the Auburn Tigers and was selected by the Cowboys in the seventh round of the 2005 NFL draft.

== Early life ==
Ratliff attended Lowndes High School in Valdosta, Georgia and was a letterman in football and basketball. He earned All-State and honorable-mention All-USA Today honors after catching 44 passes for 701 yards and seven touchdowns as a senior.

== College career ==
While attending Auburn University, Ratliff played for the Auburn Tigers football team from 2000 to 2004. As a freshman tight end he recorded 3 receptions for 38 yards, playing in 12 games (1 start).

He was converted to defensive end as a sophomore, starting eight of 12 games and tying a career-highs with 37 tackles (10 for loss), two forced fumbles and a sack. Ratliff played in nine games as a junior reserve defensive end, making seven tackles, including one for a loss.

After moving from defensive end to defensive tackle in his senior season, he started all 13 games and tied his career high with 37 tackles. He also made four tackles for a loss and a sack. He tied a single game career high with seven tackles at Auburn to earn SEC Defensive Lineman of the Week honors. He helped the Tigers win the Southeastern conference (SEC) Championship and finish 13–0 by defeating Virginia Tech in the Sugar Bowl, in which he made three tackles. Auburn finished in 2004 second behind USC in the final Associated Press poll.

== Professional career ==
Pre-draft measurables
Height	Weight	40-yard dash	20-yard shuttle	Three-cone drill	Vertical jump	Broad jump	Bench press
6 ft 3 3/4 in (1.92 m)	292 lb (132 kg)	4.85 s	4.23 s	7.35 s	33.5 in (0.85 m)	9 ft 9 in (2.97 m)	26 reps
All values from Pro Day

=== Dallas Cowboys ===
Ratliff at a Cowboys practice in 2010.

Regarded as an undersized defensive tackle, he dropped in the 2005 NFL draft until he was selected in the seventh round (224th overall pick) by the Dallas Cowboys, who were looking to play him at defensive end in their new 3–4 defense.

Ratliff played his first NFL game at Oakland (10/2) and shared a sack with linebacker Scott Shanle. He made his first start the next week against the Philadelphia Eagles (10/9) when the Cowboys opened in their nickel package. He was placed on injured reserve on November 1. In 2006, he played 15 games as part of the defensive line rotation. His quickness and relentless drive allowed him to tie for the team lead with seven quarterback pressures; made 10 tackles; four sacks (tied for third on the team); one pass breakup; and one forced fumble. He led the team in fumble recoveries, which tied for second in the NFL.

He became the starting nose tackle following an injury to Jason Ferguson early in the 2007 season and although he was seen as an undersized player for the position, he started to dominate opposing offensive linemen. He was signed to a $20.5 million, five-year contract extension on December 14, 2007, to stay with the Cowboys through the 2012 season. The deal included an $8 million signing bonus. That year, he received the team's Ed Block Courage Award recipient.

In 2008, although he faced constant double teams, he had his best statistical year, recording career highs with 51 tackles (30 solo) and 7.5 sacks, receiving his first Pro Bowl invitation and establishing him as one of the league's best 3–4 nose tackles. For his solid performance that season he was also named to the Pro Football Writers Association's All-NFC Team. The next year, he was considered one of the dominant players in the league, earning All-Pro honors, after registering 40 tackles (29 solo) and 6 sacks. He was ranked 75th by his fellow players on the NFL Top 100 Players of 2011.

By 2011 he signed a new contract extension worth $40 million to play through the 2017 season, but there were already worries that his size and style of play could shorten his career. Discussions about moving him to defensive end never materialized, and his production and health started to decline. At the end of the season, he was selected to his fourth straight Pro Bowl appearance. In 2012 he missed his first game in five years. He missed four games with a high ankle sprain and also suffered a groin injury that put him on the injured reserve list. He finished the season with only 16 tackles.

During his rehabilitation process, Ratliff relationship with the team's medical staff and even with owner Jerry Jones became tense. After his trust towards the Cowboys organization deteriorated, he hired an independent physician and started to rehab on his own.

The Cowboys still saw him as key player in the new 4–3 defense, even after assigning him to the Physically Unable to Perform list at the start of the year. After missing all preseason and the first 6 games of the season, the team terminated his contract and placed him on the failed physical list from Reserve/PUP (Physically Unable to Perform) on October 16, 2013. He finished his Cowboys career with 27 sacks, 16 passes defensed and 317 total tackles.

An already acrimonious release escalated after Ratliff's agent (Mark Slough) held a conference call on October 16, where he publicly stated that it was a serious pelvic injury that would likely take at least a year to heal. On October 23, the controversy heated up when Ratliff was cleared medically to work out for other NFL teams, only a week after being released.

=== Chicago Bears ===
On November 2, 2013, Ratliff signed a 1-year-deal with the Chicago Bears and stated that he wanted to be called Jeremiah. He made his Bears debut against the Minnesota Vikings in week thirteen, recording a tackle in a 23–20 loss. He finished with 4 starts, 14.5 tackles (1 for loss) and 1.5 sacks.

On March 5, 2014, he re-signed with the Bears on a two-year contract. His best game came in week seven against the Miami Dolphins, recording a career-high 3.5 sacks in a game. He missed five games due to injuries, but was still considered the best player on the defense, finishing with 6.5 sacks (second on the team) and 33 quarterback pressures.

Ratliff was suspended by the NFL for the first three weeks of the 2015 regular season for violating the league's Policy and Program for Substances of Abuse. The suspension was a result of an incident that occurred in 2013, where Ratliff was arrested on suspicion of drunk driving.

On October 22, 2015, he was released after what was reported as a heated exchange with general manager Ryan Pace.

== NFL career statistics ==
Legend
**Bold**	Career high

=== Regular season ===
Year	Team	Games		Tackles					Interceptions					Fumbles			
Year	Team	GP	GS	Cmb	Solo	Ast	Sck	TFL	Int	Yds	TD	Lng	PD	FF	FR	Yds	TD
2005	DAL	4	1	4	3	1	1.0	1	0	0	0	0	0	0	0	0	0
2006	DAL	15	0	21	12	9	4.0	3	0	0	0	0	1	1	3	0	0
2007	DAL	15	14	30	21	9	3.0	7	0	0	0	0	4	0	2	0	0
2008	DAL	**16**	**16**	**51**	**33**	**18**	**7.5**	**12**	0	0	0	0	**5**	0	1	0	0
2009	DAL	**16**	**16**	40	29	11	6.0	11	0	0	0	0	0	**2**	**4**	0	0
2010	DAL	**16**	**16**	31	23	8	3.5	3	0	0	0	0	2	1	2	0	0
2011	DAL	**16**	**16**	38	29	9	2.0	8	0	0	0	0	3	0	1	0	0
2012	DAL	6	6	16	10	6	0.0	1	0	0	0	0	0	0	0	0	0
2013	CHI	5	4	9	7	2	1.5	2	0	0	0	0	0	0	0	0	0
2014	CHI	11	11	37	21	16	6.5	10	0	0	0	0	0	0	0	0	0
2015	CHI	2	2	8	7	1	0.0	0	0	0	0	0	0	0	0	0	0
		122	102	285	195	90	35.0	58	0	0	0	0	15	4	13	0	0

=== Playoffs ===
Year	Team	Games		Tackles					Interceptions					Fumbles			
Year	Team	GP	GS	Cmb	Solo	Ast	Sck	TFL	Int	Yds	TD	Lng	PD	FF	FR	Yds	TD
2006	DAL	1	0	1	0	1	0.0	0	0	0	0	0	0	0	0	0	0
2007	DAL	1	1	2	0	2	0.0	0	0	0	0	0	0	0	0	0	0
2009	DAL	**2**	**2**	**5**	**2**	**3**	**1.0**	0	0	0	0	0	0	0	**1**	0	0
		4	3	8	2	6	1.0	0	0	0	0	0	0	0	1	0	0

== Personal life ==
Ratliff was arrested the evening of January 22, 2013, on suspicion of drunk driving. He was arrested twenty miles (32 km) northwest of Dallas after he sideswiped a semi-truck. No one was injured. However; Ratliff failed the field sobriety test and spent the night in jail. He was released the following morning on bond.
