= Patrick Crayton =

American football player (born 1979)

No. 12, 84
- Position: Wide receiver

Personal information
- Born: April 7, 1979 (age 47); DeSoto, Texas, U.S.
- Listed height: 6 ft 0 in (1.83 m)
- Listed weight: 205 lb (93 kg)

Career information
- High school: DeSoto
- College: Northwestern Oklahoma State (2000–2003)
- NFL draft: 2004: 7th round, 216th overall pick

Career history
- Dallas Cowboys (2004–2009); San Diego Chargers (2010–2011); New Orleans Saints (2013)*
- * Offseason or practice squad member only

Awards and highlights
- 2x First-team NAIA All-American (2001, 2003); CSFL Offensive Player of the Year (2003); 4× All-CSFL (2000–2003)

Career NFL statistics
- Receptions: 247
- Receiving yards: 3,650
- Receiving touchdowns: 25
- Return yards: 1,359
- Return touchdowns: 2
- Stats at Pro Football Reference

Patrick Jamel Crayton (born April 7, 1979) is an American former professional football player who was a wide receiver in the National Football League (NFL) for the Dallas Cowboys and San Diego Chargers. He played college football for the Northwestern Oklahoma State Rangers.

== Early life ==
Crayton attended DeSoto High School in DeSoto, Texas, where he played as a wide receiver, quarterback, running back and return specialist. He accepted a football scholarship from NAIA program Northwestern Oklahoma State University, where he was a wide receiver in his first three seasons, before switching to quarterback as a senior.

== College career ==
A four-time all-conference selection, Crayton saw time as a punt returner, kickoff returner, quarterback and wide receiver at NWOSU. In 44 games during his Ranger career, Crayton averaged 19.0 yards-per-catch and scored 17 touchdowns at receiver, rushed for 17 touchdowns, returned 72 punts for a 20.8-yard average and ten touchdowns, returned two kickoffs for scores and passed for 21 touchdowns with eight interceptions. In four years, he amassed 5,688 all-purpose yards, including 3,718 yards in total offense and 46 touchdowns. He was also a First-team NAIA All-American in 2001 and 2003, and an Honorable Mention NAIA All-American in 2000 and 2002.

As a senior in 2003, he earned CSFL Offensive Player of the Year honors starting at quarterback, while also handling kickoff returns, punt returns and logging time at wide receiver. He led NWOSU to the 2003 NAIA National Championship game his senior year, as he passed for 1,837 yards and a school-record 19 touchdowns. He also rushed for a school single-season record 1,476 yards with 13 touchdowns on 173 carries while adding 15 receptions for 331 yards and four scores. He became the first player in NAIA history to score a touchdown passing, receiving, rushing and on kickoff and punt returns in a single season.

In 2013, he was inducted into the Northwestern Oklahoma State University Sports Hall of Fame.

== Professional career ==
=== Dallas Cowboys ===
Crayton was selected by the Dallas Cowboys in the seventh round (216th overall) of the 2004 NFL draft. He was declared inactive for the first 3 weeks of the season and was waived on October 1. He was signed to the practice squad on October 4 and was later promoted to the active roster on October 29.

In 2005, he had an unexpected success, following injuries to wide receivers higher up the depth chart. He outperformed Quincy Morgan in preseason, leading to Morgan's release. In his first game of the season, Crayton continued his solid play with six receptions for 89 yards and one touchdown. However, he sustained a broken ankle on October 16 against the New York Giants, and was unable to return to full form until December 24.

The 2006 season brought Crayton back to renewed prominence, especially when the Cowboys switched quarterbacks mid-season to Tony Romo. he recorded his first 100-yard game against the Arizona Cardinals while filling in for an injured Terry Glenn. Head Coach Bill Parcells had said that Crayton possessed the best hands on the team. In the Wildcard playoff game against the Seattle Seahawks, Crayton had a diving touchdown reception in a losing effort.

In 2007, he filled in at the second receiver spot while Terry Glenn was rehabbing from a knee injury. On December 27, Crayton was rewarded for his efforts with a four-year contract extension worth $14 million. Crayton finish with 697 receiving yards, 7 touchdowns and had developed a reputation around the league as a vocal player. In the divisional round, where Dallas lost to the eventual Super Bowl XLII Champions, New York Giants, he dropped a pass that would have resulted in a critical first down if not a touchdown.

In 2008, Crayton started seven-of-16 games played and was replaced by Roy Williams in the starting position after he arrived from the Detroit Lions in week 5. By the end of the season Crayton had caught 39 passes for 550 yards and four touchdowns - which tied for second on the team with Jason Witten. He also finished with 15 punt returns for 143 yards while sharing that role with Adam "Pacman" Jones.

In 2009, he was again the number two receiver alongside Williams after the Cowboys released Terrell Owens. He would return to a backup role after Miles Austin had a break-out game against the Kansas City Chiefs. Crayon started 6 out of the 16 games and caught 37 passes for 622 yards, averaging a career-high 16.8 yards per reception, including a career long 80 yard touchdown reception in Week one against the Tampa Bay Buccaneers. He had 5 touchdowns receptions (third on the team) and scored his first career punt return touchdown in week 7 at Atlanta, which earned him NFC Special Teams Player of the Week honors. He followed it up with his second touchdown return in a week later against the Seattle Seahawks. Crayton finished with 36 punt returns for 437 yards and 2 touchdowns (tied with DeSean Jackson for first in the league punt return touchdowns) with a long of 82 yards which are all career highs.

On September 3, 2010, Crayton was traded to the San Diego Chargers in exchange for a 2011 seventh round draft pick (#220-Shaun Chapas), after his agent requested his release following the team selection of Dez Bryant in the first round.

=== San Diego Chargers ===
In 2010, he dislocated his left wrist in the second quarter of the tenth game of the season against the Denver Broncos, after making 3 receptions for 105 yards and one touchdown. He was declared inactive for the last 6 games, finishing with 28 receptions for 514 yards and 1 touchdown. The next year, he played in 14 games and was used mainly as a punt returner. He recorded 23 receptions for 248 yards and was not re-signed.

=== New Orleans Saints ===
On August 12, 2013, the New Orleans Saints signed him as a free agent after being out of football for a year. He was released on August 19.

== NFL career statistics ==
Legend
**Bold**	Career high

=== Regular season ===
Year	Team	Games		Receiving					
Year	Team	GP	GS	Tgt	Rec	Yds	Avg	Lng	TD
2004	DAL	8	0	15	12	162	13.5	39	1
2005	DAL	11	0	35	22	341	15.5	63	2
2006	DAL	**16**	7	48	36	516	14.3	53	4
2007	DAL	15	**13**	**81**	**50**	**697**	13.9	59	**7**
2008	DAL	**16**	7	70	39	550	14.1	55	4
2009	DAL	**16**	6	67	37	622	16.8	**80**	5
2010	SDG	9	2	42	28	514	**18.4**	49	1
2011	SDG	14	1	34	23	248	10.8	28	1
		105	36	392	247	3,650	14.8	80	25

=== Playoffs ===
Year	Team	Games		Receiving					
Year	Team	GP	GS	Tgt	Rec	Yds	Avg	Lng	TD
2006	DAL	1	0	5	3	42	**14.0**	**18**	**1**
2007	DAL	1	**1**	7	3	27	9.0	16	0
2009	DAL	**2**	**1**	**8**	**5**	**51**	10.2	**18**	0
		4	2	20	11	120	10.9	18	1

== Personal life ==
Crayton married his wife Najiyyah on October 27, 2007.
