= Pat Watkins =

American football player (born 1982)

No. 25, 26
- Position: Safety

Personal information
- Born: December 18, 1982 (age 43); Tallahassee, Florida, U.S.
- Listed height: 6 ft 5 in (1.96 m)
- Listed weight: 220 lb (100 kg)

Career information
- High school: Lincoln (Tallahassee)
- College: Florida State
- NFL draft: 2006: 5th round, 138th overall pick

Career history
- Dallas Cowboys (2006–2009); San Diego Chargers (2010); Toronto Argonauts (2012–2013); Edmonton Eskimos (2014–2016)

Awards and highlights
- 2× Grey Cup champion (2012, 2015); 3× CFL All-Star (2012, 2013, 2014); 2× CFL East All-Star (2012, 2013); CFL West All-Star (2014)

Career NFL statistics
- Total tackles: 128
- Forced fumbles: 1
- Fumble recoveries: 1
- Pass deflections: 10
- Interceptions: 4
- Stats at Pro Football Reference
- Stats at CFL.ca

Patrick Watkins (born December 18, 1982) is an American former professional football player who was a safety in the National Football League (NFL) for the Dallas Cowboys and San Diego Chargers. He was also a member of the Toronto Argonauts and Edmonton Eskimos in the Canadian Football League (CFL). He played college football for the Florida State Seminoles.

== Early life ==
Watkins attended Tallahassee's Lincoln High School and was a part of two state titles. As a junior, he registered 126 tackles and 5 interceptions.

As a senior, he tallied 140 tackles, 6 interceptions, 2 fumble recoveries and 6 kickoff returns for touchdowns. He received All-state, USA Today All-American and Parade magazine All-American honors.

== College career ==
Watkins accepted a football scholarship from Florida State University. As a freshman, he appeared in 11 games as a backup, while making 10 tackles.

As a sophomore, he appeared in all 13 games, making 62 tackles (fifth on the team), 3 interceptions (tied for the team lead) and 8 passes defensed (third on the team). His first career start came in the 2004 Orange Bowl against the University of Miami.

As a junior, he started in all 12 games, posting 56 tackles, 4 interceptions (tied for second in the conference), 10 passes defensed (second on the team), 2 forced fumbles and 2 fumble recoveries (tied for the team lead).

As a senior, he appeared in all 13 games with 10 starts, registering 77 tackles (third on the team) and 3 interceptions (tied for the team lead).

He finished his college career after playing in 49 straight games (23 starts) at both safety and cornerback, while recording 10 interceptions.

== Professional career ==
Pre-draft measurables
Height	Weight	Arm length	Hand span	40-yard dash	10-yard split	20-yard split	Vertical jump	Broad jump	Bench press
6 ft 4 3/4 in (1.95 m)	211 lb (96 kg)	33 1/2 in (0.85 m)	10 1/4 in (0.26 m)	4.44 s	1.49 s	2.56 s	41.0 in (1.04 m)	11 ft 1 in (3.38 m)	14 reps
All values are from the February 2006 NFL Scouting Combine.

=== Dallas Cowboys ===
Watkins was selected by the Dallas Cowboys in the fifth round (138th overall) of the 2006 NFL draft. As a rookie, he appeared in 14 games with 9 starts. He registered 49 tackles (led rookies in the NFL), 3 interceptions (second among rookies in the NFL), 6 passes defensed, 4 special teams tackles, 2 forced fumbles and one fumble recovery. He also became one of the tallest safeties in NFL history. He was declared inactive in the fifth and sixth games, as Keith Davis took over the starting position for the next 6 contests. He returned to action in the tenth game against the Arizona Cardinals in a backup role, making his first career interception.

In 2007, he became a core special teams player as a gunner. He posted 30 tackles, one interception, 3 passes defensed, 25 special teams tackles (led the team) and also returned a blocked field goal 68 yards for a touchdown against the Minnesota Vikings. He missed 2 games with an ankle injury.

In 2008, he was moved from free to strong safety, but he didn't demonstrate the tackle technique needed for run support, finishing with 15 tackles, 9 special teams tackles (eighth on the team). He missed 8 games with a neck injury and was placed on the injured reserve list on December 2.

In 2009, he collected 22 tackles and 18 special teams tackles (second on the team). He appeared in 13 games with one start, before spraining his left PCL in the thirteenth game. He missed the remainder of the regular season, but returned for the playoffs.

On August 30, 2010, he was released after missing the first 3 preseason games with a knee injury.

=== San Diego Chargers ===
On November 15, 2010, he was signed by the San Diego Chargers, with the intention of improving their special teams. On December 16, he was placed on the injured reserve list, after re-aggravating his previous knee injury. He wasn't re-signed at the end of the season.

=== Toronto Argonauts ===
On May 30, 2012, after being a year out of football recovering from his knee injury, he signed as a free agent with the Toronto Argonauts. He made 18 starts at right cornerback. He missed the Eastern Final and the Grey Cup championship game after fracturing his ankle. He finished with 67 tackles (third on the team), 5 interceptions (tied for first in the CFL), 2 fumble recoveries and received CFL All-Star honors.

In 2013, he was again named to the CFL All-Star team, after making 17 starts, 43 tackles, 5 interceptions and one fumble recovery.

=== Edmonton Eskimos ===
On February 12, 2014, he was signed by the Edmonton Eskimos as a free agent. In 18 starts he registered 36 tackles, 7 passes defensed, 4 special teams tackles, 2 forced fumbles and one fumble recovery for a 50-yard touchdown.

In 2015, he collected 66 tackles, 2 sacks and 4 interceptions (one returned for a 47-yard touchdown). He also contributed to the team winning the Grey Cup.

In 2016, he tallied 73 tackles and 2 interceptions. He wasn't re-signed after the season.

== NFL career statistics ==
Legend
**Bold**	Career high

=== Regular season ===
Year	Team	Games		Tackles					Interceptions					Fumbles			
Year	Team	GP	GS	Cmb	Solo	Ast	Sck	TFL	Int	Yds	TD	Lng	PD	FF	FR	Yds	TD
2006	DAL	14	9	**38**	**30**	**8**	0.0	0	**3**	**45**	0	**24**	**7**	**1**	**1**	**53**	0
2007	DAL	14	0	35	29	6	0.0	0	1	0	0	0	3	0	0	0	0
2008	DAL	8	0	21	16	5	0.0	0	0	0	0	0	0	0	0	0	0
2009	DAL	13	1	29	24	5	0.0	0	0	0	0	0	0	0	0	0	0
2010	SDG	4	0	5	5	0	0.0	0	0	0	0	0	0	0	0	0	0
		53	10	128	104	24	0.0	0	0	0	0	0	10	1	1	53	0

=== Postseason ===
Year	Team	Games		Tackles					Interceptions					Fumbles			
Year	Team	GP	GS	Cmb	Solo	Ast	Sck	TFL	Int	Yds	TD	Lng	PD	FF	FR	Yds	TD
2006	DAL	1	1	**2**	**2**	0	0.0	0	0	0	0	0	0	0	0	0	0
2007	DAL	1	0	0	0	0	0.0	0	0	0	0	0	0	0	0	0	0
2009	DAL	1	0	0	0	0	0.0	0	0	0	0	0	0	0	0	0	0
		3	1	2	2	0	0.0	0	0	0	0	0	0	0	0	0	0
