= Ryan Fowler =

American football player (born 1982)

No. 55, 52, 51
- Position: Linebacker

Personal information
- Born: May 20, 1982 (age 44); Redington Shores, Florida, U.S.
- Listed height: 6 ft 3 in (1.91 m)
- Listed weight: 250 lb (113 kg)

Career information
- High school: Seminole (FL)
- College: Duke
- NFL draft: 2004: undrafted

Career history
- Dallas Cowboys (2004–2006); Tennessee Titans (2007–2008); New York Jets (2009)

Awards and highlights
- Sporting News Freshman All-American (2000); Second-team All-ACC (2003)

Career NFL statistics
- Games played: 70
- Total tackles: 146
- Forced fumbles: 2
- Fumble recoveries: 1
- Stats at Pro Football Reference

Ryan Omead Fowler (born May 20, 1982) is an American former professional football player who was a linebacker in the National Football League (NFL) for the Dallas Cowboys, Tennessee Titans, and New York Jets. He played college football for the Duke Blue Devils.

== Early life ==
Fowler attended Seminole High School, where he played quarterback, running back and linebacker. As a junior, he was the Florida state champion in the discus throw. As a senior, he was the team captain of a team that qualified for the state playoffs.

He accepted a football scholarship from Duke University. As a true freshman, he made 87 tackles (led the team), 13 tackles for loss (led the team) and 7 sacks (fourth best in school history). As a sophomore, he recorded 127 tackles (led the team), 7 tackles for loss (tied for the team lead) and 3 sacks (led the team). He had 17 tackles against Georgia Tech.

As a junior, he collected 145 tackles (led the team). As a senior, he posted 136 tackles and had 8 double-digit tackle games. He had a career-high 20 tackles against Clemson University.

He finished his college career as a fourth-year starter (2 years at outside linebacker and 2 at middle linebacker), registering 495 tackles (third in school history), 47.5 tackles for loss (second in school history) and 12.5 sacks (sixth in school history). He was just the second player in school history to lead the team in tackles for 3 straight years.

== Professional career ==
Pre-draft measurables
| Height | Weight | Arm length | Hand span | 40-yard dash | 10-yard split | 20-yard split | 20-yard shuttle | Three-cone drill | Vertical jump | Broad jump | Bench press |
|---|---|---|---|---|---|---|---|---|---|---|---|
| 6 ft 3 1/8 in (1.91 m) | 250 lb (113 kg) | 32 in (0.81 m) | 9 3/8 in (0.24 m) | 4.77 s | 1.66 s | 2.76 s | 4.19 s | 7.19 s | 37.5 in (0.95 m) | 9 ft 10 in (3.00 m) | 35 reps |
All values from NFL Combine

=== Dallas Cowboys ===
Fowler was signed as an undrafted free agent by the Dallas Cowboys after the 2004 NFL draft on April 30. He was released a month later after failing a physical with an injured back. He was re-signed on August 2. He was waived on September 5 and signed to the practice squad. He was promoted to the active roster on October 15 and was declared inactive for the next 10 games. He had 2 special teams tackles.

In 2005, with Dat Nguyen retirement and Scott Shanle experiencing injuries, he was a backup inside linebacker, appearing in 14 games (3 starts), while making 16 tackles, 4 tackles for loss (second on the team) and 12 special teams tackles.

In 2006, he lost the battle for a starting linebacker spot against teammate Bradie James, but would lead the team in special teams tackles with 24.

=== Tennessee Titans ===
On March 12, 2007, Fowler signed an offer sheet with the Tennessee Titans as a restricted free agent, with the Cowboys choosing not to match the Titans' offer and not receiving any compensation. He became the sixth starter at middle linebacker for the Titans in as many years. He started 13 games before tearing his rotator cuff, labrum, biceps tendon, and suffered two avulsion fractures in his right shoulder on a second quarter play on the frozen turf against the Kansas City Chiefs in December. He finished the season with 88 tackles.

In 2008, after a long rehabilitation from reconstruction surgery, he became the first middle linebacker to be the opening day starter in two consecutive seasons since 2001. Despite that after 3 starts he was near the team lead in tackles and tackles for loss, on September 28, he was benched in favor of 2006 fourth round draft pick, Stephen Tulloch. He was waived on September 5, 2009.

=== New York Jets ===
On September 8, 2009, Fowler was signed by the New York Jets, with the team releasing fullback Jason Davis to make room on the roster. He was not re-signed at the end of the season.

=== NFL statistics ===
| Year | Team | Games | Combined tackles | Tackles | Assisted tackles | Sacks | Forced fumbles | Fumble recoveries | Fumble return yards | Interceptions | Interception return yards | Yards per interception return | Longest interception return | Interceptions returned for touchdown | Passes defended |
|---|---|---|---|---|---|---|---|---|---|---|---|---|---|---|---|
| 2004 | DAL | 2 | 1 | 1 | 0 | 0.0 | 2 | 0 | 0 | 0 | 0 | 0 | 0 | 0 | 0 |
| 2005 | DAL | 14 | 24 | 18 | 6 | 0.0 | 1 | 1 | 0 | 0 | 0 | 0 | 0 | 0 | 0 |
| 2006 | DAL | 16 | 24 | 21 | 3 | 0.0 | 0 | 0 | 0 | 0 | 0 | 0 | 0 | 0 | 0 |
| 2007 | TEN | 14 | 54 | 40 | 14 | 0.0 | 0 | 0 | 0 | 0 | 0 | 0 | 0 | 0 | 1 |
| 2008 | TEN | 16 | 29 | 20 | 9 | 0.0 | 0 | 0 | 0 | 0 | 0 | 0 | 0 | 0 | 0 |
| 2009 | NYJ | 8 | 3 | 0 | 3 | 0.0 | 0 | 0 | 0 | 0 | 0 | 0 | 0 | 0 | 0 |
| Career | | 70 | 135 | 100 | 35 | 0.0 | 3 | 1 | 0 | 0 | 0 | 0 | 0 | 0 | 1 |
