= Montavious Stanley =

American football player (born 1981)

No. 94, 96, 72, 95, 97, 99
- Position: Defensive tackle

Personal information
- Born: October 10, 1981 (age 45); Albany, Georgia, U.S.
- Listed height: 6 ft 2 in (1.88 m)
- Listed weight: 302 lb (137 kg)

Career information
- High school: Dougherty (Albany)
- College: Louisville
- NFL draft: 2006: 6th round, 182nd overall pick

Career history
- Dallas Cowboys (2006)*; St. Louis Rams (2006)*; Jacksonville Jaguars (2006); Dallas Cowboys (2006); Atlanta Falcons (2007); New Orleans Saints (2008); Jacksonville Jaguars (2009); Omaha Nighthawks (2010); Miami Dolphins (2010)*; Detroit Lions (2011)*; Las Vegas Locomotives (2011)
- * Offseason or practice squad member only

Awards and highlights
- Freshman All-American (2002); First-team All-Big East (2005)

Career NFL statistics
- Total tackles: 53
- Sacks: 1.5
- Forced fumbles: 1
- Fumble recoveries: 2
- Stats at Pro Football Reference

Montavious Stanley (born October 10, 1981) is an American former professional football player who was a defensive tackle in the National Football League (NFL) for the Dallas Cowboys, Jacksonville Jaguars, Atlanta Falcons and New Orleans Saints. He played college football for the Louisville Cardinals.

== Early life ==
Stanley attended Dougherty Comprehensive High School, where he was an accomplished three-sport athlete. As a junior he had 17 sacks, helping his team to a state title and a 13–2 record.

As a senior he made 15 sacks, contributing to an 11–2 record and reaching the state semifinals. He was a three-time All-Region and a two-time All-state selection at defensive tackle.

He was a three-time All-Region selection in basketball, helping his team win a state title as a senior, while averaging 10 points and 10 rebounds per game. He also practiced track for two years, finishing third in the region in the discus and shot put competitions as a senior.

== College career ==
Stanley accepted a football scholarship from the University of Louisville. As a redshirt freshman, he began his college career as a defensive end, tallying 16 tackles (2.5 tackles for loss) and one fumble recovery.

As a sophomore, he became a starter at left defensive end on a defensive line that included future NFL players Elvis Dumervil and Amobi Okoye. He was moved to left defensive tackle for the 2003 GMAC Bowl. He finished with 37 tackles (13 for loss), 3 sacks and 2 fumble recoveries.

As a junior, he started at right defensive tackle, registering 30 tackles (4.5 tackles for loss), 4 sacks 2 forced fumbles and 2 fumble recoveries, including one for a touchdown against Tulane University.

As a senior, although his first start came in the third game against the University of South Florida, he received All-Big East honors. He posted a career-high 48 tackles (10 for loss), 5.5 sacks, one forced fumble, and three fumble recoveries. He finished his career ranked 12th in school history with 12.5 sacks and tied for ninth with 30 tackles for loss.

== Professional career ==
Pre-draft measurables
| Height | Weight | Arm length | Hand span | 40-yard dash | 10-yard split | 20-yard split | 20-yard shuttle | Three-cone drill | Vertical jump | Broad jump |
|---|---|---|---|---|---|---|---|---|---|---|
| 6 ft 2 1/8 in (1.88 m) | 313 lb (142 kg) | 32 3/4 in (0.83 m) | 9 3/4 in (0.25 m) | 5.20 s | 1.83 s | 3.00 s | 4.60 s | 8.06 s | 29.0 in (0.74 m) | 8 ft 10 in (2.69 m) |
All values from NFL Combine

=== Dallas Cowboys (first stint) ===
Stanley was selected by the Dallas Cowboys in the sixth round (182nd overall) of the 2006 NFL draft, to play nose guard in the team's 3-4 defense. He was waived on September 2.

=== St. Louis Rams ===
On September 4, 2006, he was signed to the St. Louis Rams' practice squad.

=== Jacksonville Jaguars (first stint) ===
On September 12, 2006, the Jacksonville Jaguars signed him from the Rams' practice squad for depth purposes, after defensive end Reggie Hayward was placed on the injured reserve list. He was declared inactive in his first 3 games. He played in 3 out of 4 games, posting 4 tackles, half a sack, and a forced fumble. He was cut on November 14.

=== Dallas Cowboys (second stint) ===
On November 16, 2006, he was claimed off waivers by the Cowboys to backup Jason Ferguson. He was declared inactive for the rest of the season. He was released on August 27, 2007.

=== Atlanta Falcons ===
On August 28, 2007, he was claimed off waivers by the Atlanta Falcons. He played in 14 games (six starts) and registered 29 tackles. He was cut on August 30, 2008.

=== New Orleans Saints ===
On October 8, 2008, Stanley signed as a free agent with the New Orleans Saints and played in one game, before being placed on the injured reserve list on October 18.

=== Jacksonville Jaguars (second stint) ===
On July 23, 2009, he signed with the Jaguars. He went on to play in a career-high 15 games (no starts), finishing with 24 tackles (1 for loss), one sack and 3 passes defensed. He was waived on April 26, 2010.

=== Omaha Nighthawks ===
In 2010, he was selected with the Omaha Nighthawks of the United Football League. He played one season.

=== Miami Dolphins ===
On July 25, 2010, he was signed by the Miami Dolphins, reuniting him with various coaches and front office personnel from the Dallas Cowboys, including Bill Parcells who was his head coach as a rookie. He was acquired for depth purposes after Jason Ferguson retired and was released on September 4.

=== Detroit Lions ===
On August 8, 2011, Stanley signed with the Detroit Lions, before being waived on August 29.

=== Las Vegas Locomotives ===
In 2011, he signed with the Las Vegas Locomotives of the United Football League.
