= Brett Pierce =

American football player (born 1981)

No. 49, 88
- Position: Tight end

Personal information
- Born: January 7, 1981 (age 45); Vancouver, Washington, U.S.
- Listed height: 6 ft 6 in (1.98 m)
- Listed weight: 263 lb (119 kg)

Career information
- High school: Columbia River (WA)
- College: Stanford
- NFL draft: 2004: undrafted

Career history
- Baltimore Ravens (2004)*; Dallas Cowboys (2004–2006); Chicago Bears (2007)*; Denver Broncos (2008)*
- * Offseason or practice squad member only

Career NFL statistics
- Games played: 18
- Stats at Pro Football Reference

Brett Clayton Pierce (born January 7, 1981) is an American former professional football player who was a tight end in the National Football League (NFL) for the Baltimore Ravens and Dallas Cowboys. He played college football for the Stanford Cardinal.

== Early life ==
Pierce attended Columbia River High School, where he recorded 9 varsity letters. In football he was a two-way player (defensive end and tight end). He was a two-time All-State and two-time Defensive Player of the Year in Clark County. As a senior, he received All-American, Clark County Player of the Year, and County Athlete of the Year honors. In baseball, he was a two-time All-league selection, an All-State selection and an All-American. In basketball, he was named All-league as a junior and senior while leading the team in scoring and rebounding. As a senior, Pierce led the football team in tackles, the basketball team in scoring and rebounding, and the baseball team in batting average.

== College career ==
Pierce accepted a football scholarship from Stanford University. As a freshman, he played in 11 games and started 3 in place of an injured Russell Stewart, while also registering 6 special teams tackles. As a sophomore, he was named the starter at tight end, recording 19 receptions for 258 yards and 3 touchdowns, while becoming a key special teams performer with 14 tackles.

As a junior, he suffered a torn anterior cruciate ligament in his left knee during the season opener and was lost for the year. In 2003, he was one of two starting tight ends (Alex Smith was the other), finishing with 11 starts, 11 receptions for 84 yards and 10 special teams tackles.

As a senior, he was voted team captain while playing a dual role at tight end and fullback.

Academically, he received a B.S. in industrial engineering and M.S. in civil engineering during his tenure.

== Professional career ==
=== Baltimore Ravens ===
Pierce was signed as an undrafted free agent by the Baltimore Ravens after the 2004 NFL draft. He was released on September 6 and signed to the team's practice squad.

=== Dallas Cowboys ===
On October 3, 2004, he was signed by the Dallas Cowboys from the Ravens practice squad, to provide depth after Dan Campbell was lost for the year with a foot injury. He was the backup tight end and became a core special teams player, making 2 special teams tackles.

In 2005, he appeared in 10 games, registering 8 special teams tackles (fourth on the team), before being placed on the injured reserve list with a torn anterior cruciate ligament.

On July 30, 2006, during a training camp practice he tore again the anterior cruciate ligament in his left knee and was placed on injured reserve. It was the same ligament that he had reconstructed the previous year and in college. He wasn't re-signed after the season.

=== Chicago Bears ===
On August 1, 2007, he was signed as a free agent by the Chicago Bears. He was released on September 1.

=== Denver Broncos ===
On December 31, 2007, he signed with the Denver Broncos as a free agent. He saw time at fullback, before being waived with a left ankle injury on August 30, 2008.
