= E. J. Whitley =

American gridiron football player (born 1982)

No. 70
- Position: Guard

Personal information
- Born: February 16, 1982 (age 44); Texas City, Texas, U.S.
- Listed height: 6 ft 5 in (1.96 m)
- Listed weight: 293 lb (133 kg)

Career information
- High school: Texas City (TX)
- College: Texas Tech
- NFL draft: 2006: 7th round, 224th overall pick

Career history
- Dallas Cowboys (2006); Saskatchewan Roughriders (2008)*
- * Offseason or practice squad member only

Awards and highlights
- Second-team All-Big 12 (2005)

E. J. Whitley (born February 16, 1982) is an American former football guard in the National Football League (NFL) for the Dallas Cowboys. He played college football at Texas Tech University.

== Early life ==
Whitley attended Texas City (TX), where he was a two-way tackle. As a junior, he was a part of the state's top ranked defense, helping the team achieve a 14–0 record and win the 1999 state championship.

He was a two-time all-district player and an all-state selection as a senior. He also practiced basketball.

== College career ==
Whitley accepted a football scholarship from Texas Tech University. As a redshirt freshman, he was a backup at multiple positions on the offensive line, until starting the final 2 games at right tackle, including the 2002 Tangerine Bowl, where he helped the offense score 55 points (school record in a bowl game).

As a sophomore, he was a full-time starter and part of the nation's top passing offense. He helped reduced the number of sacks from 46 in 2002 to 23. As a junior, he started 12 games, helping quarterback Sonny Cumbie lead the nation in passing and total offense.

As a senior, he played at least one game at every offensive line position. He started mainly at both guard positions and at center, as part of an offense that led the nation in passing for the fourth straight year. He finished his college career with 45 total starts, 20 starts at right tackle, 15 at left guard, 5 at right guard, 4 at left tackle and one at center.

== Professional career ==
Pre-draft measurables
Height	Weight	Arm length	Hand span	40-yard dash	10-yard split	20-yard split	20-yard shuttle	Three-cone drill	Vertical jump	Broad jump	Bench press
6 ft 5 in (1.96 m)	309 lb (140 kg)	34 in (0.86 m)	10 1/2 in (0.27 m)	5.39 s	1.82 s	3.10 s	4.79 s	7.53 s	25.0 in (0.64 m)	8 ft 5 in (2.57 m)	16 reps
All values from NFL Combine

=== Dallas Cowboys ===
Whitley was selected by the Dallas Cowboys in the seventh round (224th overall) of the 2006 NFL draft, with the intention of playing him at guard. On May 7, he suffered a torn ACL in his left knee during rookie minicamp and was placed on the injured reserve list. He was waived on March 1, 2007.

=== Saskatchewan Roughriders ===
After not playing during the 2007 NFL season, he was invited to the 2008 rookie camp with the Saskatchewan Roughriders but did not make the team.
