= Marion Barber III =

American football player (1983–2022)

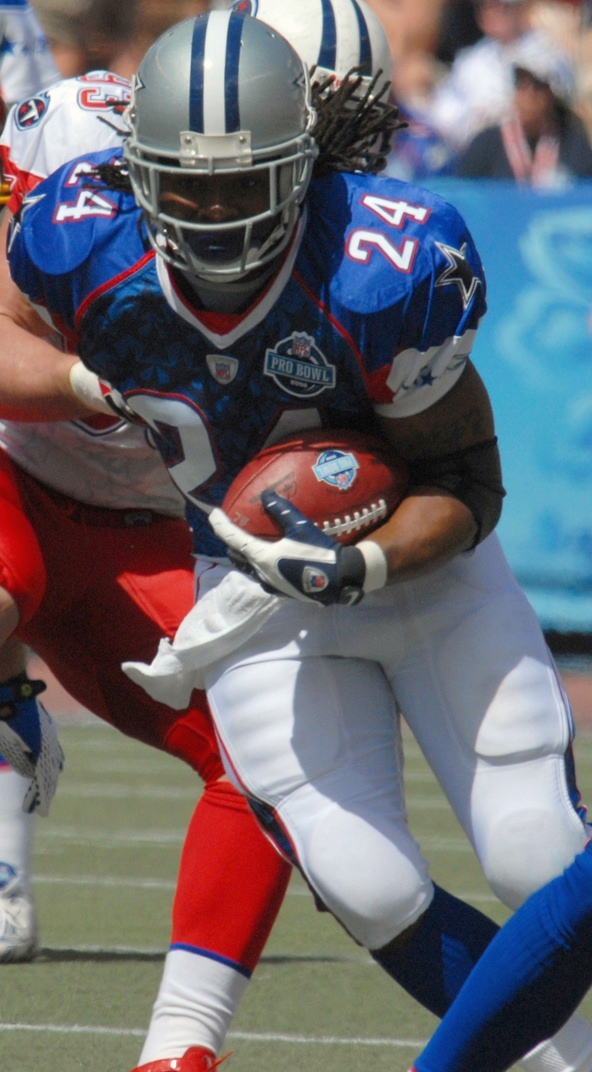
- Barber in action during the 2008 Pro Bowl

No. 24
- Position: Running back

Personal information
- Born: June 10, 1983; Plymouth, Minnesota, U.S.
- Died: June 1, 2022 (aged 38); Frisco, Texas, U.S.
- Listed height: 5 ft 11 in (1.80 m)
- Listed weight: 218 lb (99 kg)

Career information
- High school: Wayzata (Plymouth)
- College: Minnesota (2001–2004)
- NFL draft: 2005: 4th round, 109th overall pick

Career history
- Dallas Cowboys (2005–2010); Chicago Bears (2011)

Awards and highlights
- Pro Bowl (2007); First-team All-Big Ten (2003)

Career NFL statistics
- Rushing attempts: 1,156
- Rushing yards: 4,780
- Rushing touchdowns: 53
- Receptions: 179
- Receiving yards: 1,330
- Receiving touchdowns: 6
- Stats at Pro Football Reference

Marion Sylvester Barber III (June 10, 1983 – June 1, 2022) was an American professional football player who was a running back for seven seasons in the National Football League (NFL). After playing college football for the Minnesota Golden Gophers, he was selected by the Dallas Cowboys in the fourth round of the 2005 NFL draft. He was selected to the Pro Bowl in 2007 during his six-year tenure with the Cowboys. He played for the Chicago Bears in 2011.

He was the older brother of former Houston Texans safety Dominique Barber and Minnesota Golden Gophers linebacker Thomas Barber, and the son of former New York Jets running back Marion Barber Jr. He was also a cousin of Peyton Barber.

== Early life ==
Barber attended Wayzata High School in Plymouth, Minnesota, and was a standout in football, baseball, and track. In football, he was a SuperPrep and PrepStar All-Midwest and consensus All-State honoree as a senior running back and as a defensive back. During his last season with the Trojans, Barber amassed 1,778 rushing yards with 18 touchdowns and led his team with 10 interceptions (three of which came against Gatorade National Player of the Year and future Minnesota Twins catcher Joe Mauer). In baseball, he was an Honorable Mention All-Conference center fielder. In his first and only track season, Barber qualified for the 2001 Minnesota State Class AA Championships in the 100 meters. He finished the season with a 100m time of 10.9 seconds.

== College career ==
Like his father, Barber attended the University of Minnesota where he played college football for the Minnesota Golden Gophers. The coaches originally wanted him to play safety, but after seeing him run, they kept him at running back where he eventually ranked fourth on the school's all-time rushing list with 3,276 yards, second with 4,495 all-purpose yards, and second in rushing touchdowns with 35, one better than his father, Marion Barber Jr. Also beginning in his sophomore year, he teamed up with running back Laurence Maroney to form one of the best running back duos in college football, becoming the first-teammates in Division I (NCAA) history to each rush for 1,000 yards in consecutive seasons. He was an All-Big Ten Conference selection in 2003 as a redshirted sophomore.

== Professional career ==
Pre-draft measurables
| Height | Weight | Arm length | Hand span | 40-yard dash | 20-yard shuttle | Vertical jump | Broad jump | Bench press |
|---|---|---|---|---|---|---|---|---|
| 5 ft 11 3/8 in (1.81 m) | 221 lb (100 kg) | 31 1/2 in (0.80 m) | 8 7/8 in (0.23 m) | 4.49 s | 4.17 s | 40.0 in (1.02 m) | 10 ft 7 in (3.23 m) | 20 reps |
All values from NFL Combine/Minnesota Pro Day

=== Dallas Cowboys ===
After forgoing his senior season of college, the Dallas Cowboys selected Barber in the fourth round, with the 109th overall selection, of the 2005 NFL draft. A toe infection that required surgery and some preseason fumbles left him at the bottom of the depth chart. An injury to Julius Jones and the ineffectiveness of Anthony Thomas allowed Barber to emerge, and he responded with 95 yards rushing against Seattle and 127 yards against Arizona. Along with his pass-blocking and special teams abilities, this solidified his position as the backup running back for the Cowboys.

Although he was the backup to Julius Jones in 2006, Barber found a niche as a third-down rusher and a closer of games, emerging as an excellent red-zone running back. He led the NFC with 14 rushing touchdowns in 2006 and was the first non-placekicker since 2000 to lead the Cowboys in scoring (96 points).

During the 2007 season, Barber's power running back style earned him the nickname Marion the Barbarian and he was the league leader in breaking tackles, reflecting his personal mantra of "hit or get hit". Barber rushed for 975 yards on 204 carries and 10 rushing touchdowns with a 4.8 yards-per-carry rushing average. He caught 44 passes for 282 yards and two touchdowns.

On December 18, 2007, he was named to his first Pro Bowl despite officially being a backup. Barber received the start in the divisional playoff loss to the New York Giants.

Dallas offered Barber, now as a starter, the highest tender as a restricted free agent in 2008. On May 20, 2008, he signed a seven-year deal for $45 million with the Cowboys with $16 million guaranteed. Before becoming a starter, there was already a worry as to whether his running style could shortened his career; with the additional work, his career longevity was discussed more often, as his yards per carry started to drop down.

During the 2009 season, the emergence of Tashard Choice and Felix Jones, and injury problems limited his success. However, he played in 15 games despite a torn quadriceps muscle. Barber had a disappointing 2010 season as the entire Cowboys team struggled from game one. In 13 games, Barber rushed for 374 yards on 113 carries for a 3.3 yard per carry average, the lowest of his career. His four rushing touchdowns were also the lowest of his career.

Barber was released by Dallas on July 28, 2011.

=== Chicago Bears ===
On July 30, 2011, the Chicago Bears signed Barber to a two-year, $5 million contract. Barber beat out Chester Taylor for the Chicago Bears' second string running back position after Matt Forte.

On August 27 in the third pre-season game, Barber hurt his calf muscle and missed the first three games of the regular season due to the injury. In Week 14 against the Denver Broncos, replacing an injured Forte, Barber scored a touchdown and had his first 100-yard game since 2009. However, he ran out of bounds when the Bears needed to run out the clock, allowing the Broncos enough time to overtake the Bears and win the game.

In the 2011 season Barber had 422 yards on 114 carries. Following the 2011 season, Barber announced his retirement from the NFL on March 23, 2012.

== NFL career statistics ==
| Year | Team | Games | | Rushing | | | | | Receiving | | | | | Fumbles | |
| Year | Team | GP | GS | Att | Yds | Avg | Lng | TD | Rec | Yds | Avg | Lng | TD | Fum | Lost |
|---|---|---|---|---|---|---|---|---|---|---|---|---|---|---|---|
| 2005 | DAL | 13 | 2 | 138 | 538 | 3.9 | 28 | 5 | 18 | 115 | 6.4 | 21 | 0 | 3 | 0 |
| 2006 | DAL | 16 | 1 | 135 | 654 | 4.8 | 25 | 14 | 23 | 196 | 8.5 | 26 | 2 | 0 | 0 |
| 2007 | DAL | 16 | 0 | 204 | 975 | 4.8 | 54 | 10 | 44 | 282 | 6.4 | 29 | 2 | 3 | 0 |
| 2008 | DAL | 15 | 13 | 238 | 885 | 3.7 | 35 | 7 | 52 | 417 | 8.0 | 70 | 2 | 7 | 3 |
| 2009 | DAL | 15 | 15 | 214 | 932 | 4.4 | 35 | 7 | 26 | 221 | 8.5 | 42 | 0 | 2 | 2 |
| 2010 | DAL | 13 | 10 | 113 | 374 | 3.3 | 25 | 4 | 11 | 49 | 4.5 | 15 | 0 | 0 | 0 |
| 2011 | CHI | 11 | 1 | 114 | 422 | 3.7 | 29 | 6 | 5 | 50 | 10.0 | 16 | 0 | 1 | 1 |
| Career | | 99 | 42 | 1,156 | 4,780 | 4.1 | 54 | 53 | 179 | 1,330 | 7.4 | 70 | 6 | 16 | 6 |

== Personal life and death ==
In 2014, Barber was detained by police and given a mental evaluation following an incident.

In 2019, Barber was arrested on two counts of criminal mischief for causing damage to two cars while he was running. He pleaded no contest and was sentenced to one year of probation, 60 hours of community service, and a $2,000 fine in April 2022.

Barber was found dead in his apartment in Frisco, Texas on June 1, 2022, nine days short of his 39th birthday. An autopsy revealed that Barber died of heat stroke; according to police, he often exercised in "sauna-like conditions", and he had set the thermostat in his apartment to 91 °F (33 °C) before he died. His death was ruled an accident.
