= Matt Baker (American football) =

American football player and coach (born 1983)

Cleveland Browns
- Title: Assistant quarterbacks coach

Personal information
- Born: May 11, 1983 (age 43); East Lansing, Michigan, U.S.
- Listed height: 6 ft 2 in (1.88 m)
- Listed weight: 217 lb (98 kg)

Career information
- Position: Quarterback
- College: North Carolina
- NFL draft: 2006: undrafted

Career history

Playing
- Houston Texans (2006)*; Dallas Cowboys (2006–2007)*; New Orleans Saints (2007)*; Arizona Cardinals (2007)*; Miami Dolphins (2008)*; Buffalo Bills (2008–2009)
- * Offseason or practice squad member only

Coaching
- Ole Miss (2010) Graduate assistant; Western Michigan (2019) Offensive analyst; John Carroll (2020–2022) Offensive coordinator & quarterbacks coach; Atlanta Falcons (2023) Special teams assistant; Pittsburgh Steelers (2024–2025) Offensive assistant; Cleveland Browns (2026–present) Assistant quarterbacks coach

Matthew David Baker (born May 11, 1983) is an American football coach and former quarterback. He is an offensive assistant for the Pittsburgh Steelers of the National Football League (NFL). Baker played college football as a quarterback at the University of North Carolina at Chapel Hill. He was signed by the Houston Texans of the NFL as an undrafted free agent in 2006. He was a practice squad member for the Texans, Dallas Cowboys, New Orleans Saints, Arizona Cardinals, Miami Dolphins, and Buffalo Bills.

== Early life ==
Baker attended Brother Rice High School, where he was a three-year letter winner in football and lacrosse He led his football team to the state championship and a 12–1 record as a senior. He earned All-State Dream Team and Associated Press honors in football. Baker was two-time All-State and All-Midwest in lacrosse and in 2001 earned Midwest Scholastic Lacrosse Association Player of the Year and Lacrosse All-American honors.

== College career ==
Baker was fourth in the Atlantic Coast Conference (ACC) in passing and led North Carolina to a 5–6 record during his senior year. He graduated from the University of North Carolina at Chapel Hill with an economics degree and also became a brother of the Sigma Chi fraternity.

== Professional playing career ==
Baker signed as a free agent following the 2006 NFL draft with the Houston Texans. He was a member of the Dallas Cowboys practice squad in 2006-2007 serving as the team's third quarterback behind Tony Romo and Drew Bledsoe. He was released from the Dallas Cowboys July 26, 2007. Baker was signed by New Orleans on October 7, 2007, for the 2007 Training Camp, but was waived on August 21, 2007. Baker was signed to the Arizona Cardinals practice squad on October 9, 2007. He was waived on October 16, but resigned on October 23, 2007, spending the remainder of the 2007 on the practice squad. Baker was signed by the Miami Dolphins on January 30, 2008, but was waived after the Dolphins drafted Chad Henne in the 2008 NFL draft. Baker was claimed off waivers by the Buffalo Bills on May 1, 2008. He was waived/injured on August 26 and subsequently placed on injured reserve. Following the season, he became an exclusive-rights free agent. Baker was re-signed by the Bills for the 2009 season, but was released following training camp.
