= Jason Ferguson (American football) =

American football player (born 1974)

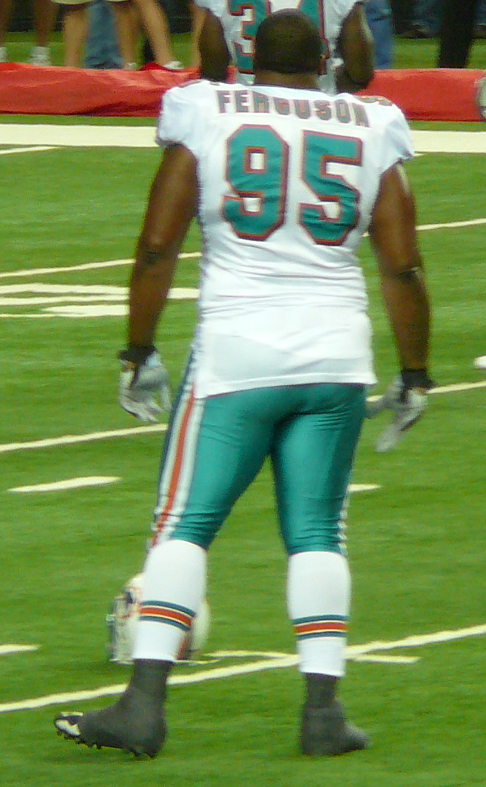
- Ferguson with the Miami Dolphins in 2009

No. 72, 95
- Position: Nose tackle

Personal information
- Born: November 28, 1974 (age 51); Nettleton, Mississippi, U.S.
- Listed height: 6 ft 3 in (1.91 m)
- Listed weight: 310 lb (141 kg)

Career information
- High school: Nettleton
- College: Georgia
- NFL draft: 1997: 7th round, 229th overall pick

Career history
- New York Jets (1997–2004); Dallas Cowboys (2005–2007); Miami Dolphins (2008–2009)

Awards and highlights
- Second-team All-SEC (1996)

Career NFL statistics
- Tackles: 503
- Sacks: 21.5
- Forced fumbles: 6
- Fumble recoveries: 2
- Stats at Pro Football Reference

Jason O. Ferguson (born November 28, 1974) is an American former professional football player who was a defensive tackle in the National Football League (NFL) for the New York Jets, Dallas Cowboys, and Miami Dolphins. He was selected by the Jets in the seventh round of the 1997 NFL draft. He played college football for the Georgia Bulldogs.

== Early life ==
Ferguson attended Nettleton High School in Nettleton, Mississippi. He earned varsity letters in football, as a center on the basketball team, and in track and field. In football, he was a two-time All-South and a three-time All-District honoree.

== College career ==
Ferguson enrolled at Itawamba Community College. He was a two-time All-Area and an All-State honoree. As a sophomore in 1994, he also earned Junior College All-American status, after recording 88 tackles and 2.5 sacks.

Ferguson originally intended to go to the University of Mississippi from Itawamba, but switched to the University of Georgia in the final 72 hours before 1995 National Signing Day.

Playing for the Georgia Bulldogs in 1995 and 1996, he lined up next to Jermaine Smith in Georgia's defensive front. In a memorable game against Auburn, Ferguson sacked quarterback Dameyune Craig on fourth-and-3 in the fourth overtime, sealing Georgia's 56–49 win.

== Professional career ==
Pre-draft measurables
Height	Weight	Arm length	Hand span	40-yard dash	10-yard split	20-yard split	Vertical jump
6 ft 3 1/8 in (1.91 m)	317 lb (144 kg)	34 in (0.86 m)	10 1/4 in (0.26 m)	5.39 s	1.87 s	3.14 s	27.5 in (0.70 m)

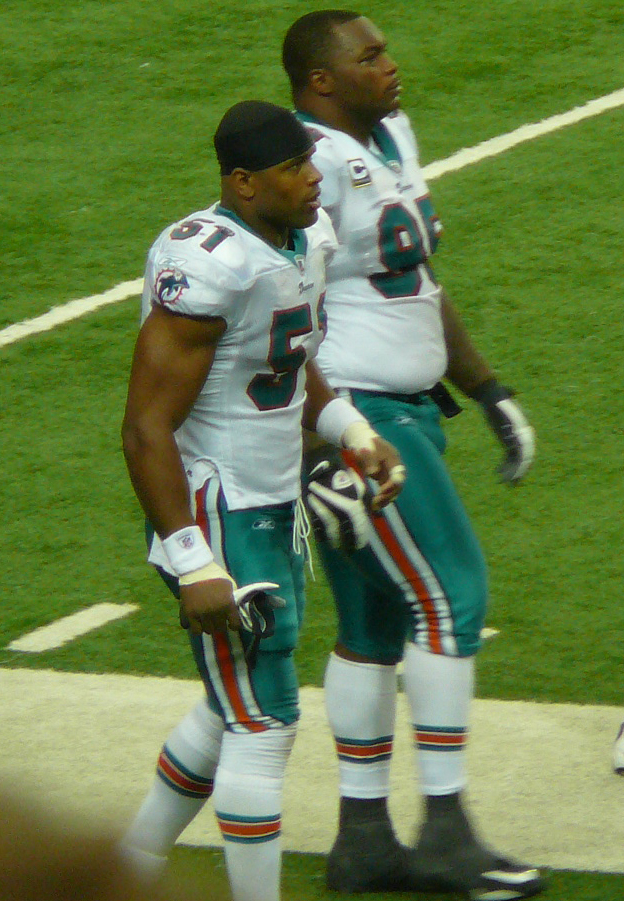
Former Cowboys teammates Ferguson (right) and Akin Ayodele in Miami in 2009.

=== New York Jets ===
It's very difficult to play our scheme if you don't have a good nose tackle. We've always had one—Jim Burt, Erik Howard—and I think Jason can be one of those.

— Then-Jets coach Bill Parcells in 1999.

Falling to the seventh round of the 1997 NFL draft, Ferguson was selected 229th overall by Bill Parcells' New York Jets. The Jets were the only club to invite him for a visit before the draft, because most teams apparently dissuaded from considering him after he was tested positive for marijuana at the pre-draft combine, reportedly being the only player to do so. Seventeen defensive tackles were taken ahead of him, including Darrell Russell and Renaldo Wynn in the first round. Parcells originally expressed reluctance to pick Ferguson at all, but trusted Georgia's head coach, Jim Donnan. Ferguson was signed to a two-year deal by the Jets only few days after the draft.

In his first season with the Jets, Ferguson shared time with veteran Ernie Logan at nose tackle, before replacing him as starter at the beginning of the 1998 NFL season. In 1999, Ferguson was suspended for four games after testing positive for steroids. After earning a $12 million contract during the 2000–2001 offseason, Ferguson tore his right rotator cuff during the first practice and missed all of the 2001 NFL season.

=== Dallas Cowboys ===
A highly coveted free-agent in 2005, coming off a very strong 2004 season in which he totaled 59 tackles and 3½ sacks, Ferguson left the Jets for the Dallas Cowboys, rejoining Bill Parcells who had become their head coach in 2003. Ferguson was signed to a five-year, $21.5 million contract that included a $9 million signing bonus. A replacement for La'Roi Glover most of the season, Ferguson started three games in 2005. After Glover left for the Rams in 2006, Ferguson took over as full-time starter.

Following a season-ending biceps injury in the Cowboys' victory over the New York Giants in Week 1 of the 2007 season, Ferguson lost his starting job to Jay Ratliff. That following off-season he was traded to the Miami Dolphins in exchange for a sixth round draft pick in the 2009 NFL draft (#197-Stephen Hodge). The teams also swapped their 2008 sixth-rounders (#167-Erik Walden), with the Cowboys moving up from the bottom third to the top of that round.

=== Miami Dolphins ===
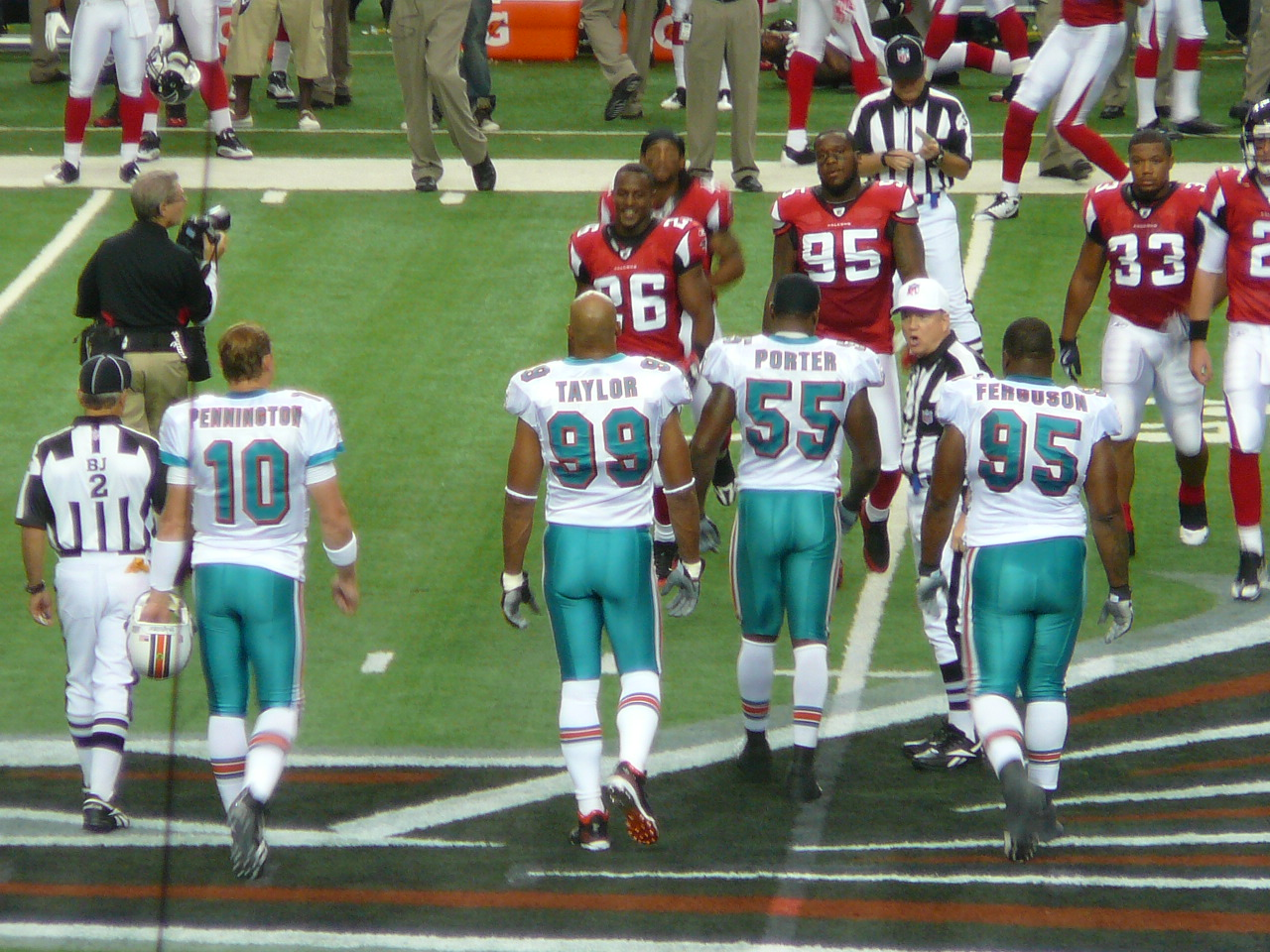
Ferguson (#95) with fellow 2009 Dolphins team captains Jason Taylor, Joey Porter and Chad Pennington.

Rejoining Bill Parcells on a third team, Ferguson became the Dolphins' starting nose tackle in 2008. He then appeared in all games and, as of November 2009, had compiled 55 tackles (33 solo). In 2008, the Dolphins' opponents averaged only 101.3 rushing yards per game, and 4.2 yards per carry.

In a game against the Carolina Panthers on November 19, Ferguson suffered a right knee injury that caused him to miss the rest of the 2009 NFL season. Considering his age and the fact that he was playing on the last year of his contract, it was believed that this injury would end his 13-year tenure as an NFL player because he planned to either re-sign with the Dolphins, or retire.

On March 6, 2010, Ferguson was suspended for the first eight games of the 2010 NFL season. He was penalized for taking steroids, the second time he failed the NFL drug test. Three days later, he re-signed with the Dolphins. However, on July 15, Ferguson announced his retirement from the NFL.

== NFL career statistics ==
Legend
	Led the league
**Bold**	Career high

=== Regular season ===
Year	Team	Games		Tackles				Interceptions				Fumbles			
Year	Team	GP	GS	Comb	Solo	Ast	Sck	Int	Yds	TD	Lng	FF	FR	Yds	TD
1997	NYJ	13	1	31	23	8	3.5	0	0	0	0	0	0	0	0
1998	NYJ	16	16	63	42	21	4.0	0	0	0	0	1	0	0	0
1999	NYJ	9	9	31	23	8	1.0	0	0	0	0	**2**	0	0	0
2000	NYJ	15	11	50	37	13	1.0	0	0	0	0	0	0	0	0
2002	NYJ	16	16	65	44	21	3.0	0	0	0	0	0	0	0	0
2003	NYJ	16	16	**75**	**52**	**23**	**4.5**	0	0	0	0	1	**1**	0	0
2004	NYJ	16	14	59	37	22	3.5	0	0	0	0	**2**	0	0	0
2005	DAL	16	5	37	27	10	1.0	0	0	0	0	0	**1**	0	0
2006	DAL	16	16	46	32	14	0.0	0	0	0	0	0	0	0	0
2007	DAL	1	1	1	0	1	0.0	0	0	0	0	0	0	0	0
2008	MIA	16	13	22	18	4	0.0	0	0	0	0	0	0	0	0
2009	MIA	9	9	23	15	8	0.0	0	0	0	0	0	0	0	0
		159	127	503	350	153	21.5	0	0	0	0	6	2	0	0

=== Playoffs ===
Year	Team	Games		Tackles				Interceptions				Fumbles			
Year	Team	GP	GS	Comb	Solo	Ast	Sck	Int	Yds	TD	Lng	FF	FR	Yds	TD
1998	NYJ	2	2	7	4	**3**	0.0	0	0	0	0	0	0	0	0
2002	NYJ	2	2	5	2	**3**	0.0	0	0	0	0	0	0	0	0
2004	NYJ	2	2	**8**	**7**	1	**2.0**	0	0	0	0	**2**	0	0	0
2006	DAL	1	1	3	1	2	0.0	0	0	0	0	0	0	0	0
2008	MIA	1	1	5	5	0	0.0	0	0	0	0	0	0	0	0
		8	8	28	19	9	2.0	0	0	0	0	2	0	0	0
