= Oliver Hoyte =

American football player (born 1984)

No. 53, 46
- Position: Linebacker / Fullback

Personal information
- Born: October 5, 1984 (age 42); Tampa, Florida, U.S.
- Listed height: 6 ft 3 in (1.91 m)
- Listed weight: 252 lb (114 kg)

Career information
- High school: Chamberlain (Tampa)
- College: North Carolina State
- NFL draft: 2006: undrafted

Career history
- Dallas Cowboys (2006–2007); Kansas City Chiefs (2008)*
- * Offseason or practice squad member only

Career NFL statistics
- Games played: 22
- Receptions: 3
- Receiving yards: 12
- Stats at Pro Football Reference

Oliver Hoyte (born October 5, 1984) is an American former professional football player who was a linebacker in the National Football League (NFL) for the Dallas Cowboys. He played college football for the NC State Wolfpack.

== Early life ==
Hoyte attended Chamberlain High School, where was a three-time All-conference and a two-time All-state selection. As a senior he posted 153 tackles (98 solo) and 5 sacks, while helping the team reach the Class 5A state championship game.

He received All-state honors as a junior and senior and was an All-conference selection three straight years.

== College career ==
Hoyte accepted a football scholarship from North Carolina State University. As a true freshman, he appeared in 14 games, tallying 51 tackles, 3 tackles for loss and one sack. As a sophomore, he started 11 games, making 97 tackles (second on the team) and 8 tackles for loss.

As a junior starter, even though he came off the field in passing situations, he collected 93 tackles (led the team), 14.5 tackles for loss (ninth best in school history) and 1.5 sacks.

As a senior, he started 10 games, registering 99 tackles (second on the team), 12 tackles for loss, one sack and 2 forced fumbles. He was part of a defense that included future NFL players Manny Lawson and Mario Williams on the defensive side.

== Professional career ==
=== Dallas Cowboys ===
Hoyte was signed as an undrafted free agent by the Dallas Cowboys after the 2006 NFL draft on May 3. After earning a roster spot as a reserve linebacker and a solid special teams prospect, although he hadn't played the position since high school, he was converted into a fullback at the end of October and started 5 games. He also posted 5 special teams tackles.

In 2007, he had 9 starts at fullback, but also missed 6 games with a neck injury. On February 28, 2008, he was released to make room for linebacker Zach Thomas, after he appeared in 22 games (14 starts) during his two years with the team.

=== Kansas City Chiefs ===
On March 3, 2008, the Kansas City Chiefs claimed him off waivers. During training camp, the team played him at middle linebacker and was released before the start of the season due to a neck injury.

== Personal life ==
After football, he coached at Chamberlain High School, semi-pro ball for the Florida Thunder and was the linebackers coach at Tiffin University in 2010.
