= 2008 Dallas Cowboys season =

NFL team season

- Owner: Jerry Jones
- General manager: Jerry Jones
- Head coach: Wade Phillips
- Home stadium: Texas Stadium

Results
- Record: 9–7
- Division place: 3rd NFC East
- Playoffs: Did not qualify
- All-Pros: DeMarcus Ware (1st team); Jason Witten (2nd team)
- Pro Bowlers: Flozell Adams T Leonard Davis G Andre Gurode C Jay Ratliff DT; DeMarcus Ware LB; Jason Witten TE

Uniform
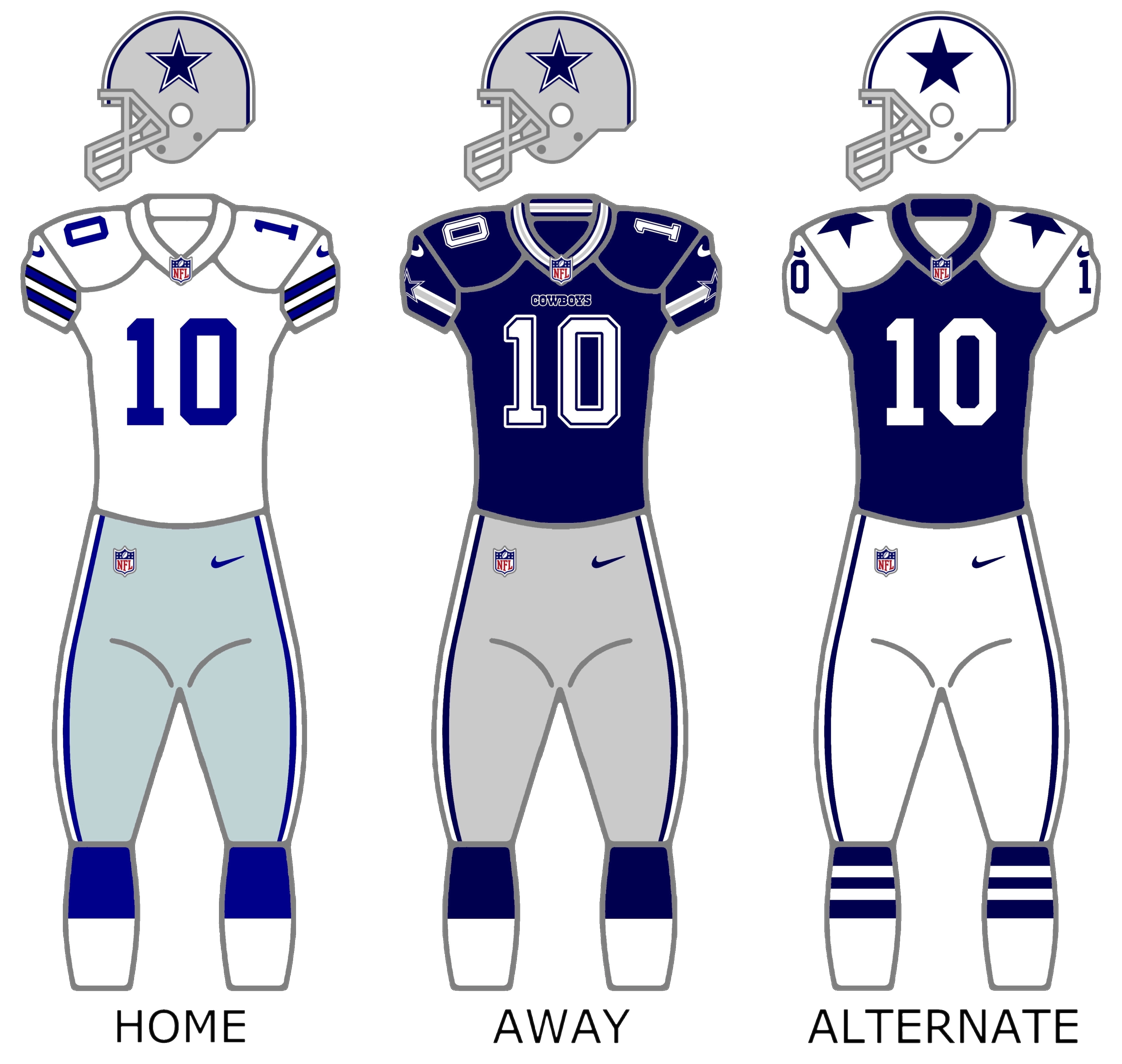

The 2008 Dallas Cowboys season was the franchise's 49th season in the National Football League (NFL). The season ended when the Cowboys were blown out by the Philadelphia Eagles 44–6 in week 17, their worst loss since the 1985 Chicago Bears came to Texas Stadium and beat the Cowboys 44–0. It was the last season the Cowboys played at Texas Stadium; they moved to Cowboys Stadium in 2009. Despite entering the last month of the season four games above .500, they failed to make the playoffs for the first time since 2005, losing three of their last four games and finishing with a 9–7 record.

== Offseason ==
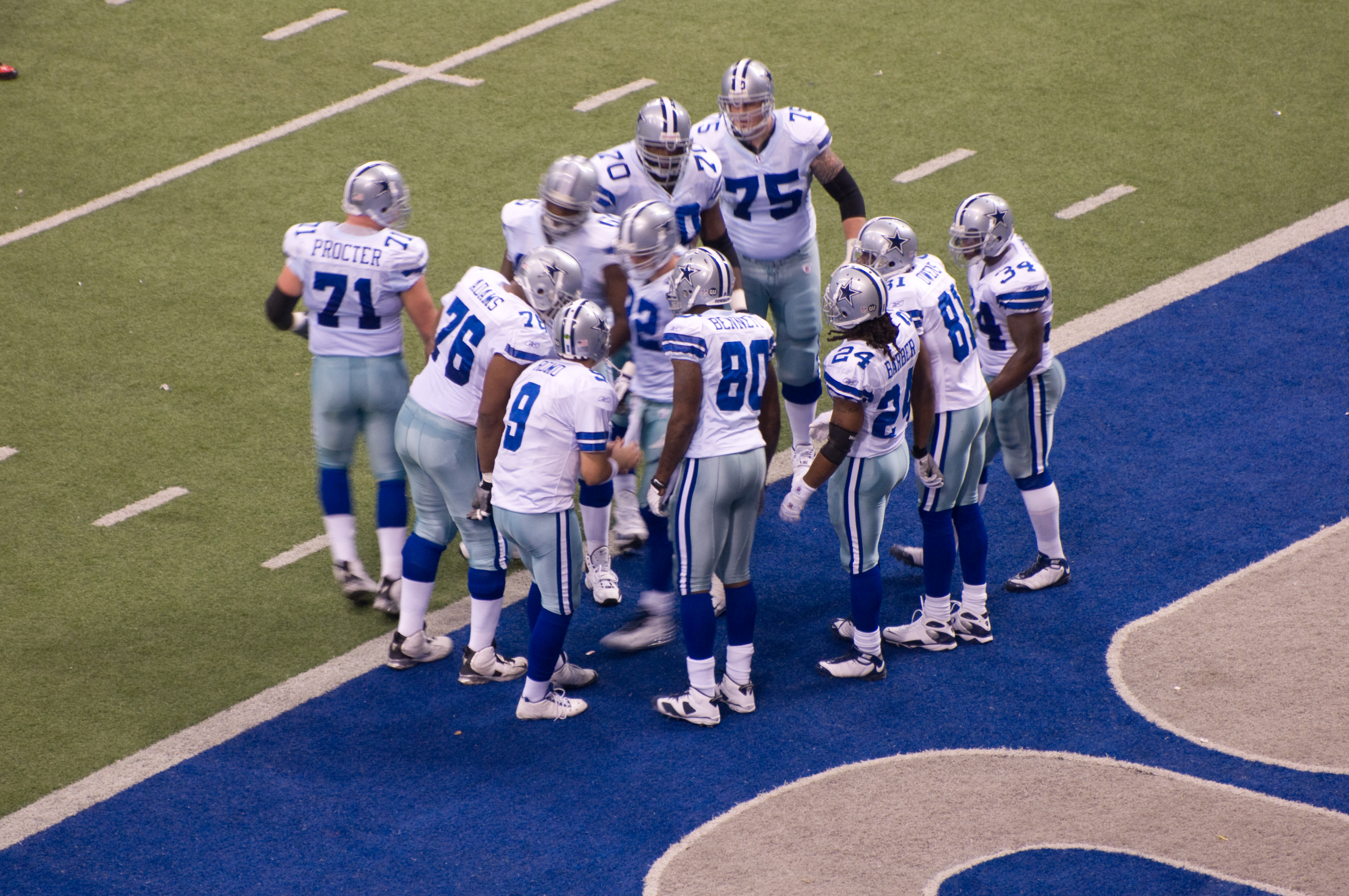
The Cowboys' offense breaks huddle against the New York Giants, December 14, 2008

=== Signings ===
- Re-signed long snapper L. P. Ladouceur to a five-year contract extension.
- Re-signed pro-bowl left offensive tackle Flozell Adams.
- Signed veteran linebacker Zach Thomas to one-year, $3 million deal.
- Placed the franchise tag on Pro Bowl free safety Ken Hamlin.
- Traded for Ex-Titan defensive back Adam "Pacman" Jones.

=== Departures ===
- Released Wide Receiver Terry Glenn
- Released fullback Oliver Hoyte who has signed with the Kansas City Chiefs.
- Cornerback Jacques Reeves joined the Houston Texans.
- Running back Julius Jones signed a four-year deal with the Seattle Seahawks.
- Safety Keith Davis signed with the Miami Dolphins, but re-signed with the Cowboys after his subsequent release from Miami.
- Defensive tackle Jason Ferguson, linebacker Akin Ayodele and tight end Anthony Fasano traded to the Miami Dolphins.

=== Free agents heading into the 2008 season ===
- Cornerback Nate Jones

=== Training camp ===
The Cowboys arrived in Oxnard, California for training camp on July 24. HBO and NFL Films filmed the Cowboys for the fourth season of Hard Knocks which premiered on August 6. The Cowboys began camp with all but three players: Felix Jones, Mike Jenkins, and Terry Glenn. Jones and Jenkins both signed contracts the next day, and flew out to California to report. Soon afterward, Terry Glenn was released to waivers. Owner Jerry Jones explained that, "I think at the end of the day, it had more to do with where we are right now, the managing of how he got to the field, the aspect of concentrating on the what ifs and how it might've impacted how we give our young players a chance, and how we evaluate that position." The main story lines in camp have revolved around the new addition of Adam "Pacman" Jones, and the injury to Terence Newman. Jones was proving daily in camp that he is still worthy of being named one of the top cornerbacks in the league, but was not fully reinstated to the NFL until August 28. Newman injured his groin on July 28, and is expected to be out for three weeks. The Cowboys cut the roster from 80 to 75 immediately after training camp, then waived more players following the final pre-season game to drop the roster count to league limit of 53, one of which was 6th-round draft pick Eric Walden. Walden was picked up on waivers by the Kansas City Chiefs. The following players made it through waivers to land spots on the practice squad: Danny Amendola, Alonzo Coleman, Tearrius George, Rodney Hannah, Mike Jefferson, Marcus Dixon and Julius Crosslin. Then, in a surprising turn of events, Dallas CB Evan Ogelsby was released to make room on the roster for Special Teams Ace Keith Davis who returned to the Cowboys after being cut from the Dolphins.

=== 2008 draft class ===
2008 Dallas Cowboys draft
Round	Pick	Player	Position	College	Notes
1	22	Felix Jones	RB	Arkansas	
1	25	Mike Jenkins *	CB	South Florida	
2	61	Martellus Bennett *	TE	Texas A&M	
4	122	Tashard Choice	RB	Georgia Tech	
5	143	Orlando Scandrick	CB	Boise State	
6	167	Erik Walden	DE	Middle Tennessee	
Made roster † Pro Football Hall of Fame * Made at least one Pro Bowl during career

Notes

- The Cowboys traded their 2007 first-round (No. 22 overall) selection to the Cleveland Browns for 2007 second-round (No. 36 overall) and 2008 first-round (No. 22 overall) selections.
- The Cowboys traded their first, (No. 28 overall) fifth (No. 163 overall) and seventh-round (No. 235 overall) selections for the Seattle Seahawks' first-round (No. 25 overall) selection in order to move up in the first-round and select Mike Jenkins.
- The Cowboys traded their third-round (No. 92 overall) selection to the Detroit Lions for 2008 and 2009 fourth-round (Nos. 111 and 101 overall) selections.
- The Cowboys traded linebacker Akin Ayodele and tight end Anthony Fasano to the Miami Dolphins in exchange for a fourth-round (No. 100 overall) selection.
- The Cowboys traded their fourth-round (No. 100 overall) selection to the Oakland Raiders in exchange for fourth (No. 104 overall) and seventh-round (No. 213 overall) selections.
- The Cowboys traded their fourth-round (No. 104 overall) selection to the Cleveland Browns in exchange for fourth (No. 122 overall) and fifth-round (No. 155 overall) selections.
- The Cowboys traded their 2008 fourth-round (No. 111 overall) selection to the Browns in exchange for a 2009 third-round (No. 69 overall) selection.
- The Cowboys traded their original fourth-round (No. 126 overall) selection to the Tennessee Titans for cornerback Adam Jones. The Cowboys were to receive a conditional 2009 fourth-round selection if Jones is not reinstated, or a conditional 2009 fifth-round selection if Jones is reinstated but gets suspended again (the Cowboys received the Titans' 2009 fifth-round selection, No. 166 overall).
- The Cowboys traded their fifth (No. 155 overall) and seventh-round (No. 213 overall) selections to the Jacksonville Jaguars in exchange for a fifth-round (No. 143 overall) selection.
- The Cowboys traded defensive tackle Jason Ferguson and their 2008 sixth-round (No. 195 overall) selection to the Dolphins in exchange for 2008 and 2009 sixth-round (Nos. 167 and 197 overall) selections.

=== Undrafted free agents ===
Name	Position	College
Danny Amendola	Wide receiver	Texas Tech
Drew Atchison	Tight end	William & Mary
Mark Bradford	Wide receiver	Stanford
Julius Crosslin	Fullback	Oklahoma State
Dowayne Davis	Safety	Syracuse
Marcus Dixon	Defensive end	Hampton
Keon Lattimore	Running back	Maryland
Jay Ottovegio	Punter	Stanford
Daniel Polk	Wide receiver	Midwestern State
Darrell Robertson	Defensive end	Georgia Tech

== Rosters ==
=== Opening training camp roster ===
Dallas Cowboys 2008 opening training camp roster
Quarterbacks: 4 Richard Bartel; 14 Brad Johnson; 9 Tony Romo; Running backs: 34 Deon Anderson FB; 24 Marion Barber III; 29 Tashard Choice; 30 Alonzo Coleman; 39 Julius Crosslin FB; 45 Ronnie Cruz FB; 28 Felix Jones; 35 Keon Lattimore; Wide receivers: 18 Danny Amendola; 19 Miles Austin KR; 13 Mark Bradford; 84 Patrick Crayton PR; 83 Terry Glenn; 17 Sam Hurd; 85 Mike Jefferson; 81 Terrell Owens; 15 Daniel Polk; 86 Isaiah Stanback; Tight ends: 87 Drew Atchison; 80 Martellus Bennett; 89 Tony Curtis; 44 Rodney Hannah; 82 Jason Witten	Offensive linemen: 76 Flozell Adams T; 67 Joe Berger G; 75 Marc Colombo T; 70 Leonard Davis G; 68 Doug Free T; 62 Ryan Gibbons G/T; 65 Andre Gurode C; 63 Kyle Kosier G; 79 Cory Lekkerkerker T; 78 James Marten T; 77 Pat McQuistan T; 71 Cory Procter C; 61 Adam Stenavich G; Defensive linemen: 92 Remi Ayodele NT; 72 Stephen Bowen DE; 99 Chris Canty DE; 95 Marcus Dixon DE; 97 Jason Hatcher DE; 66 Tank Johnson NT; 90 Jay Ratliff NT/DE; 64 Junior Siavii NT; 60 Marcus Smith DE; 96 Marcus Spears DE	Linebackers: 57 Kevin Burnett ILB; 54 Bobby Carpenter ILB; 98 Greg Ellis OLB/DE; 59 Tearrius George OLB; 56 Bradie James ILB; 51 Darrell Robertson OLB; 50 Justin Rogers OLB; 58 Tyson Smith OLB; 93 Anthony Spencer OLB; 55 Zach Thomas ILB; 53 Erik Walden OLB; 94 DeMarcus Ware OLB/DE; Defensive backs: 20 Alan Ball CB; 27 Courtney Brown FS; 36 Quincy Butler CB; 47 Dowayne Davis SS; 37 Tyler Everett SS; 26 Ken Hamlin FS; 42 Anthony Henry CB; 31 Mike Jenkins CB; 41 Terence Newman CB; 23 Evan Oglesby CB; 32 Orlando Scandrick CB; 25 Pat Watkins FS; 38 Roy Williams SS; Special teams: 6 Nick Folk K; 91 L. P. Ladouceur LS; 1 Mat McBriar P; 2 Jay Ottovegio P	Reserve lists: 21 Adam Jones CB (Susp.); Rookies in italics 78 active, 1 inactive

=== Week one roster ===
Dallas Cowboys 2008 week one roster
Quarterbacks: 14 Brad Johnson; 9 Tony Romo; Running backs: 34 Deon Anderson FB; 24 Marion Barber III; 23 Tashard Choice; 28 Felix Jones; Wide receivers: 19 Miles Austin KR; 84 Patrick Crayton PR; 17 Sam Hurd; 85 Mike Jefferson; 81 Terrell Owens; 86 Isaiah Stanback; Tight ends: 80 Martellus Bennett; 89 Tony Curtis; 82 Jason Witten	Offensive linemen: 76 Flozell Adams T; 67 Joe Berger C; 75 Marc Colombo T; 70 Leonard Davis G; 68 Doug Free T; 65 Andre Gurode C; 64 Montrae Holland G; 63 Kyle Kosier G; 77 Pat McQuistan T/G; 71 Cory Procter G; Defensive linemen: 72 Stephen Bowen DE; 99 Chris Canty DE; 97 Jason Hatcher DE; 95 Tank Johnson NT; 90 Jay Ratliff NT/DE; 96 Marcus Spears DE	Linebackers: 57 Kevin Burnett ILB; 54 Bobby Carpenter ILB; 98 Greg Ellis OLB/DE; 56 Bradie James ILB; 50 Justin Rogers OLB; 93 Anthony Spencer OLB; 55 Zach Thomas ILB; 94 DeMarcus Ware OLB/DE; Defensive backs: 20 Alan Ball CB; 27 Courtney Brown FS; 29 Keith Davis SS; 26 Ken Hamlin FS; 42 Anthony Henry CB; 31 Mike Jenkins CB; 21 Adam Jones CB; 41 Terence Newman CB; 32 Orlando Scandrick CB; 25 Pat Watkins SS; 38 Roy Williams SS; Special teams: 6 Nick Folk K; 91 L. P. Ladouceur LS; 1 Mat McBriar P	Reserve lists: 37 Tyler Everett SS (IR); Practice Squad: 18 Danny Amendola WR; 4 Richard Bartel QB; 30 Alonzo Coleman RB; 39 Julius Crosslin FB; 92 Marcus Dixon DE; 59 Tearrius George OLB; 44 Rodney Hannah TE; Rookies in italics 53 active, 1 inactive, 7 PS

=== Final roster ===
Dallas Cowboys 2008 final roster
Quarterbacks: 5 Brooks Bollinger; 14 Brad Johnson; 9 Tony Romo; Running backs: 34 Deon Anderson FB; 24 Marion Barber; 23 Tashard Choice; 30 Alonzo Coleman; Wide receivers: 19 Miles Austin KR; 84 Patrick Crayton PR; 81 Terrell Owens; 11 Roy Williams; Tight ends: 80 Martellus Bennett; 89 Tony Curtis; 44 Rodney Hannah; 82 Jason Witten	Offensive linemen: 76 Flozell Adams T; 67 Joe Berger G/T; 75 Marc Colombo T; 70 Leonard Davis G; 68 Doug Free T; 65 Andre Gurode C; 64 Montrae Holland G; 77 Pat McQuistan T; 71 Cory Procter C/G; Defensive linemen: 72 Stephen Bowen DE; 99 Chris Canty DE; 97 Jason Hatcher DE; 95 Tank Johnson NT; 90 Jay Ratliff NT; 96 Marcus Spears DE	Linebackers: 57 Kevin Burnett ILB; 54 Bobby Carpenter ILB; 98 Greg Ellis OLB; 56 Bradie James ILB; 53 Steve Octavien OLB; 52 Carlos Polk ILB; 50 Justin Rogers OLB; 93 Anthony Spencer OLB; 55 Zach Thomas ILB; 94 DeMarcus Ware OLB; Defensive backs: 20 Alan Ball CB/S; 35 Tra Battle FS; 27 Courtney Brown SS; 29 Keith Davis SS; 26 Ken Hamlin FS; 42 Anthony Henry CB; 31 Mike Jenkins CB; 21 Adam Jones CB/SS/KR/PR; 41 Terence Newman CB; 32 Orlando Scandrick SS; Special teams: 6 Nick Folk K; 91 L. P. Ladouceur LS; 2 Sam Paulescu P	Reserve lists: 17 Sam Hurd WR (IR); 28 Felix Jones RB (IR); 63 Kyle Kosier G (IR); 1 Mat McBriar P (IR); 86 Isaiah Stanback WR/KR (IR); 25 Pat Watkins S (IR); 38 Roy Williams S (IR); Practice Squad: 18 Danny Amendola WR; 39 Julius Crosslin FB; 92 Marcus Dixon DE; 62 Ryan Gibbons G/T; 43 Marcus Thomas RB; 36 Vickiel Vaughn S; 87 Paris Warren WR; 10 Travis Wilson WR; Rookies in italics 53 active, 7 inactive, 8 practice squad

== Preseason schedule ==
Week	Date	Opponent	Result	Record	Game site	NFL.com recap
1	August 9	at San Diego Chargers	L 17–31	0–1	Qualcomm Stadium	Recap
2	August 16	at Denver Broncos	L 13–23	0–2	Invesco Field at Mile High	Recap
3	August 22	Houston Texans	W 23–22	1–2	Texas Stadium	Recap
4	August 28	Minnesota Vikings	W 16–10	2–2	Texas Stadium	Recap

== Schedule ==
Week	Date	Opponent	Result	Record	Game site	NFL.com recap
1	September 7	at Cleveland Browns	W 28–10	1–0	Cleveland Browns Stadium	Recap
2	September 15	Philadelphia Eagles	W 41–37	2–0	Texas Stadium	Recap
3	September 21	at Green Bay Packers	W 27–16	3–0	Lambeau Field	Recap
4	September 28	Washington Redskins	L 24–26	3–1	Texas Stadium	Recap
5	October 5	Cincinnati Bengals	W 31–22	4–1	Texas Stadium	Recap
6	October 12	at Arizona Cardinals	L 24–30 (OT)	4–2	University of Phoenix Stadium	Recap
7	October 19	at St. Louis Rams	L 14–34	4–3	Edward Jones Dome	Recap
8	October 26	Tampa Bay Buccaneers	W 13–9	5–3	Texas Stadium	Recap
9	November 2	at New York Giants	L 14–35	5–4	Giants Stadium	Recap
10	Bye					
11	November 16	at Washington Redskins	W 14–10	6–4	FedExField	Recap
12	November 23	San Francisco 49ers	W 35–22	7–4	Texas Stadium	Recap
13	November 27	Seattle Seahawks	W 34–9	8–4	Texas Stadium	Recap
14	December 7	at Pittsburgh Steelers	L 13–20	8–5	Heinz Field	Recap
15	December 14	New York Giants	W 20–8	9–5	Texas Stadium	Recap
16	December 20	Baltimore Ravens	L 24–33	9–6	Texas Stadium	Recap
17	December 28	at Philadelphia Eagles	L 6–44	9–7	Lincoln Financial Field	Recap

== Standings ==
NFC East
	W	L	T	PCT	DIV	CONF	PF	PA	STK
^{(1)} New York Giants	12	4	0	.750	4–2	9–3	427	294	L1
^{(6)} Philadelphia Eagles	9	6	1	.594	2–4	7–5	416	289	W1
Dallas Cowboys	9	7	0	.563	3–3	7–5	362	365	L2
Washington Redskins	8	8	0	.500	3–3	7–5	265	296	L1

== Regular season summary ==
The team was coming from a 13–3 season in 2007 and there were great expectations for a Super Bowl run. During the offseason, the Cowboys signed the controversial talents of Pacman Jones and Tank Johnson. They also were the subject of the 2008 Hard Knocks TV Series.

The team began the season with 3 straight wins but lost the week-4 game at home against the Washington Redskins 24–26. Tony Romo injured the pinkie finger in his right hand in a 24–30 loss to the Arizona Cardinals in the sixth game. The Cowboys under his replacement Brad Johnson, went 1–2 the next three games, losing to the St. Louis Rams, beating the Tampa Bay Buccaneers, and losing to the New York Giants. Romo would return to play wearing a splint under the heavy bandage on his right hand in November after the bye week.

The team had a 24–33 loss in Week 16 against the Baltimore Ravens and the final game at Texas Stadium before it was demolished. In what became a de facto playoff game in the 17th week of the season against the Philadelphia Eagles on December 28, Romo and the Cowboys failed to compete in a 44–6 loss. The team finished with a 9–7 record, missing the postseason for the first time in franchise history after starting the season with a 3–0 record.

== Game summaries ==
=== Week 1: at Cleveland Browns ===
Quarter	1	2	3	4	Total
Cowboys	7	14	7	0	28
Browns	0	7	0	3	10

at Cleveland Browns Stadium, Cleveland, Ohio

- Game time: 4:15 PM EST
- Game weather: 71 °F (22 °C) (Cloudy)
- Game attendance: 73,012
- Referee: Bill Carollo
- TV announcers (Fox): Joe Buck, Troy Aikman & Pam Oliver

The Cowboys began their 2008 campaign on the road against the Cleveland Browns. In the first quarter, Dallas got the first shot as running back Marion Barber got a 1-yard touchdown run. In the second quarter, the Browns would respond with quarterback Derek Anderson completing a 2-yard touchdown pass to tight end Kellen Winslow. Afterwards, the Cowboys responded with quarterback Tony Romo completing a 35-yard touchdown pass to wide receiver Terrell Owens, along with another 1-yard touchdown run from Barber. In the third quarter, Dallas pulled away with rookie running back Felix Jones getting an 11-yard touchdown run, which was his first carry in the NFL. In the fourth quarter, Cleveland's only response would be kicker Phil Dawson's 34-yard field goal.

=== Week 2: vs. Philadelphia Eagles ===
Quarter	1	2	3	4	Total
Eagles	6	24	0	7	37
Cowboys	14	10	7	10	41

at Texas Stadium, Irving, Texas

- Game time: 8:30 PM EDT
- Game weather: 76 °F (24 °C)
- Game attendance: 63,472
- Referee: Terry McAulay
- TV announcers (ESPN): Mike Tirico, Ron Jaworski, Tony Kornheiser, Michele Tafoya, & Suzy Kolber

Coming off their commanding road win over the Browns, the Cowboys played their Week 2 home opener under the Monday Night Football spotlight. In the last Monday Night Football game at Texas Stadium, Dallas would duel with their NFC East foe, the Philadelphia Eagles. In the first quarter, the Cowboys trailed early as Eagles kicker David Akers got a 34-yard field goal. Dallas would answer in their first possession with quarterback Tony Romo completing a 72-yard touchdown pass to wide receiver Terrell Owens. Philadelphia replied with Akers kicking a 44-yard field goal, yet the Cowboys immediately added to their lead with rookie running back Felix Jones returning a kickoff 98 yards for a touchdown. The Eagles would take the lead with quarterback Donovan McNabb completing a 6-yard touchdown pass to running back Brian Westbrook, along with linebacker Chris Gocong recovering a Romo fumble in the Cowboys' endzone for a touchdown. Dallas immediately responded with Romo and Owens hooking up with each other again on a 4-yard touchdown pass.

On Philadelphia's next drive, the referees made two suspect decisions. The first was a non-call on a very obvious facemask on Brian Westbrook that would have given the Eagles a first down. The next call in question was a 40-yard passing interference penalty on Anthony Henry. Replays showed that it was Greg Lewis who grabbed Henry's jersey and pulled him down, not the other way around. With that decision, the Eagles were awarded a first down on the 1-yard line. Westbrook immediately ran it in for a 1-yard touchdown. On their next possession, Akers' hit a 22-yard field goal. To make the game the highest scoring half ever on Monday Night Football, the Cowboys ended the half with kicker Nick Folk getting a 51-yard field goal, bringing the total points for both teams to 54.

In the third quarter, the Cowboys regained the lead with Romo's 17-yard touchdown pass to running back Marion Barber. In the fourth quarter, the Eagles once again took the lead with Westbrook's 1-yard touchdown run. Afterwards, the Cowboys rallied with Folk nailing a 47-yard field goal and Barber getting a 1-yard touchdown run. The Eagles had a chance for a game-winning drive, but Dallas' defense stiffened for the victory, sacking the very elusive McNabb twice.

In a game that had 9 lead changes, it also set different point records, including most first half points in Monday Night Football history (54) and most combined points in the rivalry's history (78).

Also, Terrell Owens (3 receptions for 89 yards and 2 touchdowns) reached 132 career touchdown catches, placing him 2nd on the NFL's all-time touchdown receptions list (behind only Jerry Rice's record of 197).

=== Week 3: at Green Bay Packers ===
Quarter	1	2	3	4	Total
Cowboys	3	10	7	7	27
Packers	3	3	3	7	16

at Lambeau Field, Green Bay, Wisconsin

- Game time: 8:15 p.m. EDT/7:15 p.m. CDT
- Game weather: 64 °F (18 °C) (Mostly Cloudy)
- Game attendance: 71,113
- Referee: Mike Carey
- TV announcers (NBC): Al Michaels (play-by-play), John Madden (color commentator), & Andrea Kremer (sideline reporter)

Coming off the MNF divisional home win over the Eagles, the Cowboys flew to Lambeau Field for a Week 3 Sunday Night duel with the Green Bay Packers. Dallas had never won in Lambeau Field heading into the game, going 0–5 (although Green Bay did play several home games in Milwaukee where the Cowboys won a few times against the Packers).

In the first quarter, Dallas got the first shot as kicker Nick Folk got a 25-yard field goal. The Packers responded with kicker Mason Crosby getting a 36-yard field goal. In the second quarter, Green Bay took the lead with Crosby kicking a 38-yard field goal. The 'Boys replied with rookie RB Felix Jones getting a 60-yard TD run, becoming the first player in franchise history to have a touchdown in each of his first three games with Dallas. In the third quarter, the Packers tried to rally as Crosby got a 33-yard field goal, yet the Cowboys responded with RB Marion Barber getting a 2-yard TD run. In the fourth quarter, Dallas managed to put the game out of reach as QB Tony Romo completed a 52-yard TD pass to WR Miles Austin. Green Bay tried to rally as QB Aaron Rodgers got a 1-yard TD run, yet the Big D's defense held.

With the win, not only did the Cowboys get a second-straight 3–0 start for the first time since 1976–77, but they also picked up their first-ever win at Lambeau Field.

=== Week 4: vs. Washington Redskins ===
Quarter	1	2	3	4	Total
Redskins	0	17	3	6	26
Cowboys	7	3	7	7	24

at Texas Stadium, Irving, Texas

- Game time: 4:15 p.m. EDT/3:15 p.m. CDT
- Game weather: 85 °F (29 °C) (Sunny)
- Game attendance: 63,462
- Referee: Walt Anderson
- TV announcers (Fox): Joe Buck, Troy Aikman, & Pam Oliver

Coming off their Sunday night road win over the Packers, the Cowboys went home for a Week 4 NFC East showdown with the Washington Redskins. In the first quarter, the 'Boys shot first as QB Tony Romo completed a 21-yard TD pass to TE Jason Witten. In the second quarter, the Redskins took the lead as QB Jason Campbell completed a 3-yard TD pass to WR James Thrash and a 2-yard TD pass to WR Antwaan Randle El, along with kicker Shaun Suisham getting a 20-yard field goal. Dallas closed out the half with kicker Nick Folk getting a 36-yard field goal.

In the third quarter, the Cowboys tied the game with Romo completing a 10-yard TD pass to WR Terrell Owens. Washington would respond with Suisham kicking a 33-yard field goal. In the fourth quarter, the Redskins increased their lead with Suisham nailing a 33-yard and a 29-yard field goal. The 'Boys tried to rally as Romo completed an 11-yard TD pass to WR Miles Austin. However, Dallas' onside kick attempt failed, preserving the Redskins' win.

=== Week 5: vs. Cincinnati Bengals ===
Quarter	1	2	3	4	Total
Bengals	0	6	7	9	22
Cowboys	10	7	0	14	31

at Texas Stadium, Irving, Texas

- Game time: 4:15 pm EDT/3:15 pm CDT
- Game weather: 87 °F (31 °C) (sunny)
- Game attendance: 62,655
- Referee: Bill Leavy
- TV announcers (CBS): Jim Nantz and Phil Simms

Hoping to rebound from their divisional home loss to the Redskins, the Cowboys stayed at home for a Week 5 interconference duel with the Cincinnati Bengals. In the first quarter, the Cowboys shot first as kicker Nick Folk got a 30-yard field goal, along with rookie RB Felix Jones getting a 33-yard TD run. In the second quarter, Dallas increased its lead with QB Tony Romo completing a 4-yard TD pass to TE Jason Witten. The Bengals closed out the half as kicker Shayne Graham got a 41-yard and a 31-yard field goal.

In the third quarter, Cincinnati crept closer as QB Carson Palmer completed an 18-yard TD pass to WR T. J. Houshmandzadeh. In the fourth quarter, the Bengals got within one point as Graham kicked a 40-yard field goal, yet the Cowboys responded with Romo completing a 57-yard TD pass to WR Terrell Owens. The Bengals tried to come back as Palmer completed a 10-yard TD pass to Houshmandzadeh (with a failed two-point conversion), but Dallas pulled away as Romo completed a 15-yard TD pass to WR Patrick Crayton.

=== Week 6: at Arizona Cardinals ===
Quarter	1	2	3	4	OT	Total
Cowboys	0	7	7	10	0	24
Cardinals	7	0	7	10	6	30

at University of Phoenix Stadium, Glendale, Arizona

- Game time: 4:15 p.m. EDT/3:15 p.m. CDT
- Game weather: None (Dome Closed)
- Game attendance: 64,389
- Referee: Peter Morelli
- TV announcers (Fox): Dick Stockton, Troy Aikman, & Pam Oliver

Coming off their home win over the Bengals, the Cowboys flew to the University of Phoenix Stadium for a Week 6 showdown with the Arizona Cardinals. In the first quarter, Dallas immediately trailed as Cardinals RB J.J. Arrington returned the game's opening kickoff 93 yards for a touchdown. In the second quarter, the 'Boys responded with QB Tony Romo completing a 55-yard TD pass to WR Patrick Crayton. In the third quarter, the Cowboys took the lead as Romo completed a 14-yard TD pass to WR Miles Austin. Arizona would tie the game with QB Kurt Warner completing a 2-yard TD pass to WR Larry Fitzgerald. In the fourth quarter, the Cardinals took the lead as Warner completed an 11-yard TD pass to WR Steve Breaston, along with kicker Neil Rackers getting a 41-yard field goal. Afterwards, the 'Boys tied the game with Romo completing a 70-yard TD pass to RB Marion Barber, along with kicker Nick Folk nailing a 52-yard field goal. However, in overtime, Arizona emerged as WR Sean Morey blocked a punt attempt, allowing LB Monty Beisel to return it 3 yards for the game-ending touchdown.

In the week following the game Tony Romo was listed as questionable with a broken right pinkie finger. In addition, Matt McBriar and Sam Hurd were placed in injured reserve, and Felix Jones was listed as out for 2–3 weeks with a hamstring injury. Furthermore, Adam (Pacman) Jones was suspended by the NFL for a minimum of 4 weeks after an altercation with his bodyguard.

The Cowboys traded for WR Roy Williams with the Detroit Lions, in exchange for their first, third, and sixth-round picks.

=== Week 7: at St. Louis Rams ===
Quarter	1	2	3	4	Total
Cowboys	7	0	0	7	14
Rams	21	3	7	3	34

at Edward Jones Dome, St. Louis, Missouri

- Game time: 1:00 p.m. EDT/12:00 p.m. CDT
- Game weather: None (Domed Stadium)
- Game attendance: 62,035
- Referee: John Parry
- TV announcers (Fox): Kenny Albert, Daryl Johnston, & Tony Siragusa

Hoping to rebound from their road loss to the Cardinals, and missing several key starters, the Cowboys flew to the Edward Jones Dome for a Week 7 duel with the St. Louis Rams. With Tony Romo recovering from his injured pinkie, he was demoted to back-up for the game, allowing veteran QB Brad Johnson to get the start.

In the first quarter, the 'Boys shot first as RB Marion Barber got a 1-yard TD run. The Rams would go on to score 34 unanswered points with QB Marc Bulger completing a 42-yard TD pass to WR Donnie Avery, along with RB Steven Jackson getting an 8-yard and a 1-yard TD run. In the second quarter, St. Louis increased their lead as kicker Josh Brown got a 52-yard field goal. In the third quarter, Dallas continued to struggle as Jackson got a 56-yard TD run. In the fourth quarter, the Rams ended their domination with Brown nailing a 35-yard field goal. Afterwards, the 'Boys got their only response as Johnson completed a 34-yard TD pass to rookie TE Martellus Bennett.

With the stunning loss, the Cowboys fell to 4–3.

=== Week 8: vs. Tampa Bay Buccaneers ===
Quarter	1	2	3	4	Total
Buccaneers	6	0	3	0	9
Cowboys	0	10	3	0	13

at Texas Stadium, Irving, Texas

- Game time: 1:00 p.m. EDT / 12:00 p.m. CDT
- Game weather: 74 °F (23 °C) (Sunny)
- Game attendance: 63,254
- Referee: Gene Steratore
- TV announcers (Fox): Kenny Albert, Daryl Johnston, & Tony Siragusa

Hoping to rebound from their road loss to the Rams, the Cowboys went home for a Week 8 duel with the Tampa Bay Buccaneers. With QB Tony Romo still nursing an injured pinkie, QB Brad Johnson got the start against the team that he helped win Super Bowl XXXVII.

In the first quarter, Dallas trailed early as Buccaneers kicker Matt Bryant got a pair of 36-yard field goals. In the second quarter, the 'Boys took the lead as kicker Nick Folk got a 38-yard field goal, along with Johnson completing a 2-yard TD pass to WR Roy Williams. In the third quarter, Dallas increased its lead with Folk making a 45-yard field goal. Tampa Bay responded with Bryant nailing a 41-yard field goal. Afterward, the Big D's defense held on for the victory.

=== Week 9: at New York Giants ===
Quarter	1	2	3	4	Total
Cowboys	0	7	0	7	14
Giants	14	7	7	7	35

at Giants Stadium, East Rutherford, New Jersey

- Game time: 4:15 PM EDT
- Game weather: 48 °F (9 °C) (Partly Cloudy)
- Game attendance: 78,826
- Referee: Jerome Boger
- TV announcers (Fox): Joe Buck, Troy Aikman, & Pam Oliver

Coming off their home win over the Buccaneers, the Cowboys flew to Giants Stadium for a Week 9 NFC East duel with the New York Giants. With QB Tony Romo nursing an injured pinkie, QB Brad Johnson once again got the start.

In the first quarter, the 'Boys trailed early as Giants QB Eli Manning completed a 13-yard TD pass to TE Kevin Boss and a 5-yard TD pass to WR Steve Smith. In the second quarter, Dallas responded with rookie CB Mike Jenkins returning an interception 23 yards for a touchdown. New York would answer with Manning completing an 11-yard TD pass to WR Amani Toomer. After the half, Johnson (5/11 for 71 yards and 2 interceptions) was benched for QB Brooks Bollinger.

In the third quarter, the Giants increased their lead as RB Brandon Jacobs got a 12-yard TD run. In the fourth quarter, the 'Boys tried to rally as Bollinger completed an 8-yard TD pass to WR Terrell Owens. However, New York pulled away as RB Derrick Ward got a 17-yard TD run.

With the loss, the Cowboys entered their bye week 5–4.

=== Week 11: at Washington Redskins ===
Quarter	1	2	3	4	Total
Cowboys	0	7	0	7	14
Redskins	7	3	0	0	10

at Fedex Field, Landover, Maryland

- Game time: 8:15 PM EDT
- Game weather: 44 °F (7 °C) (Clear)
- Game attendance: 90,830
- Referee: Jeff Triplette
- TV announcers (NBC): Al Michaels, John Madden, & Andrea Kremer

Coming off their bye week, the Cowboys flew to Fedex Field for a Week 11 NFC East rematch with the Washington Redskins on Sunday Night Football.

In the first quarter, the 'Boys trailed early as Redskins QB Jason Campbell completed a 2-yard TD pass to FB Mike Sellers. In the second quarter, Dallas responded with RB Marion Barber getting a 2-yard TD run. Washington would close out the half with kicker Shaun Suisham getting a 41-yard field goal. After a scoreless third quarter, the Cowboys took a fourth quarter lead as QB Tony Romo completed a 25-yard TD pass to rookie TE Martellus Bennett. Afterwards, Dallas' defense kept the Redskins' offense from making any kind of a comeback.

With the win, the Cowboys improved to 6–4.

=== Week 12: vs. San Francisco 49ers ===
Quarter	1	2	3	4	Total
49ers	6	0	3	13	22
Cowboys	0	22	7	6	35

at Texas Stadium, Irving, Texas

- Game time: 1:00 PM EDT
- Game weather: 64 °F (18 °C) (Partly cloudy)
- Game attendance: 63,272
- Referee: Mike Carey
- TV announcers (Fox): Joe Buck, Troy Aikman, and Pam Oliver

Coming off their divisional road win over the Redskins, the Cowboys went home, donned their throwback uniforms, and played a Week 12 game with the San Francisco 49ers. In the first quarter, Dallas trailed early as 49ers kicker Joe Nedney made a 23-yard and a 22-yard field goal. In the second quarter, the Cowboys took a lead as QB Tony Romo completed a 75-yard TD pass to WR Terrell Owens, LB Carlos Polk blocked an Andy Lee punt into the back of the 49ers' endzone for a safety, kicker Nick Folk making a 48-yard and a 41-yard field goal, and Romo throwing a 45-yard pass to T.O., Then completing a 1-yard TD pass to TE Martellus Bennett.

In the third quarter, the Cowboys increased their lead as Romo completed a 10-yard TD pass to WR Patrick Crayton. San Francisco answered with Nedney getting a 35-yard field goal. In the fourth quarter, the 'Boys replied with Folk getting a 47-yard field goal. The 49ers would try to stay in pace as QB Shaun Hill completed an 18-yard TD pass to WR Isaac Bruce, yet Dallas pulled away as Folk nailed a 42-yard field goal. The 49ers tried to come back as Hill completed a 9-yard TD pass to RB DeShaun Foster, yet Dallas's defense held from there on out.

With the win, the Cowboys improved to 7–4.

Terrell Owens, having gone through 14-straight games without having a 100-yard receiving day, snapped his futility streak by having 7 catches for 213 yards and a touchdown. His 213 receiving yards would be his 2nd-highest single game total in his career. Tony Romo finished with another 300 yard game giving him 13 300 yard games.

=== Week 13: vs. Seattle Seahawks ===
Quarter	1	2	3	4	Total
Seahawks	3	3	3	0	9
Cowboys	14	10	7	3	34

at Texas Stadium, Irving, Texas

- Game time: 4:15 PM EDT
- Game weather: 69 °F (21 °C) (Clear)
- Game attendance: 63,253
- Referee: John Parry
- TV announcers (Fox): Joe Buck, Troy Aikman, & Pam Oliver

The Cowboys opened the game with a 5-play 71-yard drive that ended on a touchdown reception by rookie tight end Martellus Bennett. This effort marked the first time the Cowboys scored on their first drive since the last St. Louis game, and the sixth time to do so all season. On the ensuing drive, the Dallas defense forced a Seahawk fumble that was recovered by cornerback Anthony Henry. Dallas was able to drive deep into Seattle territory, and eventually gave the ball to running back Marion Barber for a 1-yard touchdown run. Following the Dallas drive, the Seahawks had to settle for a 44-yard field goal.

Once the second quarter began, the Cowboys successfully used their passing game to move to the endzone; tight end Jason Witten scored the touchdown on a 7-yard catch. The touchdown followed by the extra point extended Dallas' lead to 21–3. On the next drive, the Cowboys defense limited the Seahawks offense to a punt. Starting a fresh drive at the Cowboy 20, quarterback Tony Romo threw a 38-yard strike to Roy E. Williams. Three consecutive incompletions by Romo led the Cowboys to send in kicker Nick Folk to hit a 41-yard field goal through the uprights. After an unsuccessful offensive drive by the Seahawks, the Dallas offense returned to the field, though were forced to their first three-and-out. Once Seattle got the ball back, quarterback Matt Hasselbeck found two of his receivers who both combined for a gain of 47 yards. The Seahawks, however, lost nine of those yards on two quarterback sacks. They had to settle again for another field goal to cut Dallas' lead to 24–6. Both of the team's offenses each had one three-and-out during the 1:31 left in the half. The Cowboys got the ball back, though did not have much time to engineer a successful drive. Romo kneeled to end the half. Overall, Dallas' four scoring drives in the first half consisted of 26 plays, 17 of which occurred on a first down; just three came on third down.

Once the third quarter commenced, the Seahawks took the time to move the ball deep into the Dallas red zone. They were stopped on third down at the Dallas 7, and elected to go for their third field goal. This drive took 5:23, the longest drive thus far in the game. On Dallas' next possession, cornerback Marcus Trufant intercepted an endzone pass that was intended for wideout Terrell Owens. The Seahawks offense was unable to capitalize on the turnover, as they were unable to convert for the first down. Dallas followed with an unsuccessful drive that ended on their second punt of the game. The Seahawks faced their second three-and-out of the quarter on their ensuing possession; their punt led Dallas to field their offense at the Dallas 44. After two plays, Romo threw to Owens for a 33-yard gain. Owens scored a touchdown off a 19-yard catch on the next play, extending the Cowboys' lead to 31–9. Seattle failed again to produce a score during the two minutes left in the third quarter.

Dallas had the ball in possession once the fourth quarter began. The Cowboys gave the ball to rookie running back Tashard Choice to drain the clock. Choice contributed a total of 62 rushing yards to the drive, including long gain of 27. Despite Choice's help, Dallas had to score a field goal to complete the 6-minute drive. Trailing 34–9, the Seahawks still aimed to score a touchdown. Their effort was cut short when Cowboys cornerback Terrence Newman compiled an interception at the Dallas 2 on the Seahawks' third play of the drive. With 7:51 remaining in the game, Dallas was not able to convert for the first down and punted the ball, which the Seahawks retrieved at their 43. During the final six minutes of the game, the Seahawks pulled another three-and-out. Dallas then continued to run out the clock but had to give the ball back to Seattle. The Seahawks still had a chance to score in the final two minutes, but fell short again. The Cowboys won 34–9.

Linebacker DeMarcus Ware finished with 4 tackles and 3 sacks, which earned him the NFL on Fox's 2008 Galloping Gobbler Award.

The Jonas Brothers performed during halftime (one of the members, Nick Jonas, was born in Dallas), while Demi Lovato (also a Dallas native) performed the national anthem.

=== Week 14: at Pittsburgh Steelers ===
Quarter	1	2	3	4	Total
Cowboys	0	3	10	0	13
Steelers	0	3	0	17	20

at Heinz Field, Pittsburgh, Pennsylvania

- Game time: 4:15 PM EDT
- Game weather: 22 °F (−6 °C) (Mostly cloudy)
- Game attendance: 60,594
- Referee: Alberto Riveron
- TV announcers (Fox): Joe Buck, Troy Aikman, & Pam Oliver

This was the Cowboys and Steelers' 30th all time meeting.

In a defensive battle, neither team managed to score in the 1st quarter. In the second quarter, the only scores were a 44-yard field goal by Nick Folk for Dallas and a 24-yard field by Jeff Reed for Pittsburgh. The teams went into halftime tied at 3.

In the 3rd, Tony Romo found Terrell Owens for a 12-yard touchdown pass that broke the tie. Then, a 33-yard field goal by Nick Folk sent the Cowboys into the 4th quarter with a 13–3 lead. Midway through the 4th, Jeff Reed connected on a 41-yard field goal to cut the Cowboys' lead to 13–6. Then, Ben Roethlisberger and Tight End Heath Miller hooked up for a 6-yard Steelers touchdown that tied the game at 13. On the ensuing Dallas possession, Tony Romo was intercepted by Deshea Townsend who returned it 25 yards for a touchdown, and Pittsburgh led 20–13. After the kickoff, the Cowboys failed to convert on a 4th-and-10 and the Steelers got the ball back. They were then able to run the clock out and seal the victory.

With the Cowboys falling to 8–5, the New York Giants clinched the NFC East (despite losing to the Eagles).

=== Week 15: vs. New York Giants ===
Quarter	1	2	3	4	Total
Giants	0	3	0	5	8
Cowboys	0	7	0	13	20

at Texas Stadium, Irving, Texas

- Game time: 8:15 PM EDT
- Referee: Walt Anderson
- TV announcers (NBC): Al Michaels, John Madden, & Andrea Kremer

In battle for field position the first points came in the second quarter with Tony Romo connecting with Patrick Crayton on a 34-yard touchdown pass. New York answered with a 34-yard field goal from John Carney.

As New York tried to get a drive going they contended with the a Dallas defence that leads the league in sacks. Quarterback Eli Manning was brought down eight times during the game. In the fourth quarter Dallas extended its small lead with a 1-yard touchdown pass to full back Deon Anderson. After a mistake by the Dallas offensive line the Giants scored a safety. Later John Carney nailed a 47-yard field goal to make the score 14–8 for Dallas. With 2:24 left on the clock Dallas sealed the win with a 38-yard touchdown run by Tashard Choice. The two-point conversion failed.

With the win, Dallas improved to 9–5. This would be the last Cowboys win at Texas Stadium and for the 2008 NFL Season.

=== Week 16: vs. Baltimore Ravens ===
Quarter	1	2	3	4	Total
Ravens	3	6	7	17	33
Cowboys	7	0	0	17	24

at Texas Stadium, Irving, Texas

- Game time: 8:15 PM EDT
- Game weather: 45 °F (7 °C) (Clear)
- Game attendance: 63,800
- Referee: Ed Hochuli
- TV announcers (NFL Network): Bob Papa, Deion Sanders, and Marshall Faulk

Coming off their win over the Giants, the Cowboys stayed at home for a Week 16 interconference battle with the Baltimore Ravens, in what would be the final game at Texas Stadium.

In the first quarter, Dallas struck first as rookie running back Tashard Choice got a 2-yard touchdown run. The Ravens would respond with a 26-yard field goal from kicker Matt Stover. Baltimore would take the lead in the second quarter as Stover got a 29-yard and a 37-yard field goal. In the third quarter, the Ravens increased their lead as quarterback Joe Flacco completed a 13-yard touchdown pass to wide receiver Derrick Mason. The Cowboys answered in the fourth quarter as kicker Nick Folk got a 35-yard field goal, but Baltimore answered right back with Stover's 35-yard field goal. Dallas tried to rally as quarterback Tony Romo completed a 7-yard touchdown pass to wide receiver Terrell Owens, but the Ravens struck right back as running back Willis McGahee got a 77-yard touchdown run. The Cowboys tried to come back as Romo completed a 21-yard touchdown pass to tight end Jason Witten, but the Ravens pulled away with fullback Le'Ron McClain's 82-yard touchdown run (the longest TD run that the Cowboys would ever give up during their tenure at Texas Stadium).

With the loss, Dallas fell to 9–6 on the season and 0–3 all-time against the Ravens. For a while they lost their chances of controlling the NFC Wild Card spot, but got it back the next day with the Tampa Bay Buccaneers losing 41–24 to the San Diego Chargers.

=== Week 17: at. Philadelphia Eagles ===
Quarter	1	2	3	4	Total
Cowboys	3	0	0	3	6
Eagles	3	24	17	0	44

at Lincoln Financial Field, Philadelphia, Pennsylvania

- Game time: 4:15 PM EDT
- Game weather: 62 °F (17 °C) (Cloudy)
- Game attendance: 69,144
- Referee: Scott Green
- TV announcers (Fox): Joe Buck, Troy Aikman, & Pam Oliver

Hoping to recover from their home loss to the Ravens, the Cowboys closed out their regular season at Lincoln Financial Field in a crucial Week 17 NFC East rematch with the Philadelphia Eagles. Both teams knew whoever won this game was guaranteed the sixth and final spot heading into the postseason.

Dallas trailed early in the first quarter as Eagles kicker David Akers got a 40-yard field goal. Dallas would respond with kicker Nick Folk getting a 37-yard field goal. However, in the second quarter, Philadelphia would take a huge lead as quarterback Donovan McNabb would get a 1-yard touchdown run and complete a 4-yard touchdown pass to running back Correll Buckhalter, along with a 1-yard touchdown pass to tight end Brent Celek. Afterwards, the Eagles would close out the half with a 50-yard field goal from Akers.

In the third quarter, the Cowboys' playoff hopes continued to fade as defensive end Chris Clemons returned a fumble 73 yards for a touchdown, while cornerback Joselio Hanson returned another fumble 96 yards for a touchdown. Philadelphia would close out the period with Akers' 41-yard field goal.

With the loss, the Cowboys finished 9–7, ensuring they would be 0–9 in Week 17 games since 2000. Also with the loss, the Cowboys were eliminated from playoff contention.

== Statistics ==
Through Week 5

=== Passing ===
Player	G	QB Rat.	Comp.	Att.	Pct.	Yards	TD	INT	Long	Sack
Tony Romo	5	100.5	104	162	64.2	1,368	12	5	72	7
Patrick Crayton	5	39.6	0	1	0.0	0	0	0	0	0

=== Rushing ===
Player	G	Att.	Yards	Y/G	Avg.	Long	TD	Fum	FumL
Marion Barber	5	93	395	79.0	4.2	25	4	2	1
Felix Jones	5	27	244	48.8	9.0	60	3	0	0
Tashard Choice	5	5	26	5.2	5.2	15	0	0	0
Terrell Owens	5	3	19	3.8	6.3	8	0	0	0
Tony Romo	5	10	7	1.4	0.7	7	0	3	2
Deon Anderson	3	1	3	1.0	3.0	3	0	0	0

=== Receiving ===
Player	G	Rec.	Yards	Y/G	Avg.	Long	TD
Jason Witten	5	35	442	88.4	12.6	42	2
Terrell Owens	5	19	331	66.2	17.4	72	3
Patrick Crayton	5	16	207	41.4	12.9	26	2
Miles Austin	4	7	172	43.0	24.6	63	2
Marion Barber	5	14	106	21.2	7.6	25	1
Martellus Bennett	5	3	57	11.4	19.0	37	0
Isaiah Stanback	3	2	24	8.0	12.0	15	0
Tony Curtis	5	5	17	3.4	3.4	8	0
Felix Jones	5	2	10	2.0	5.0	7	0
Tashard Choice	5	1	2	0.4	2.0	2	0

=== Kicking ===
Player	G	0–19	20–29	30–39	40–49	50+	FGM	FGA	Pct.	Long	XPM	XPA
Nick Folk	5	0–0	1–1	3–3	1–1	1–1	6	6	100.0	51	20	20

=== Punting ===
Player	G	Punt	Yards	Avg.	In20	In10	TB	Long
Mat McBriar	5	17	840	49.4	2	2	2	66

== See also ==
- 2008 AFC East standings
- 2008 AFC North standings
- 2008 AFC South standings
- 2008 AFC West standings
- 2008 NFC North standings
- 2008 NFC South standings
- 2008 NFC West standings
