= Roy Williams (safety) =

American football player (born 1980)

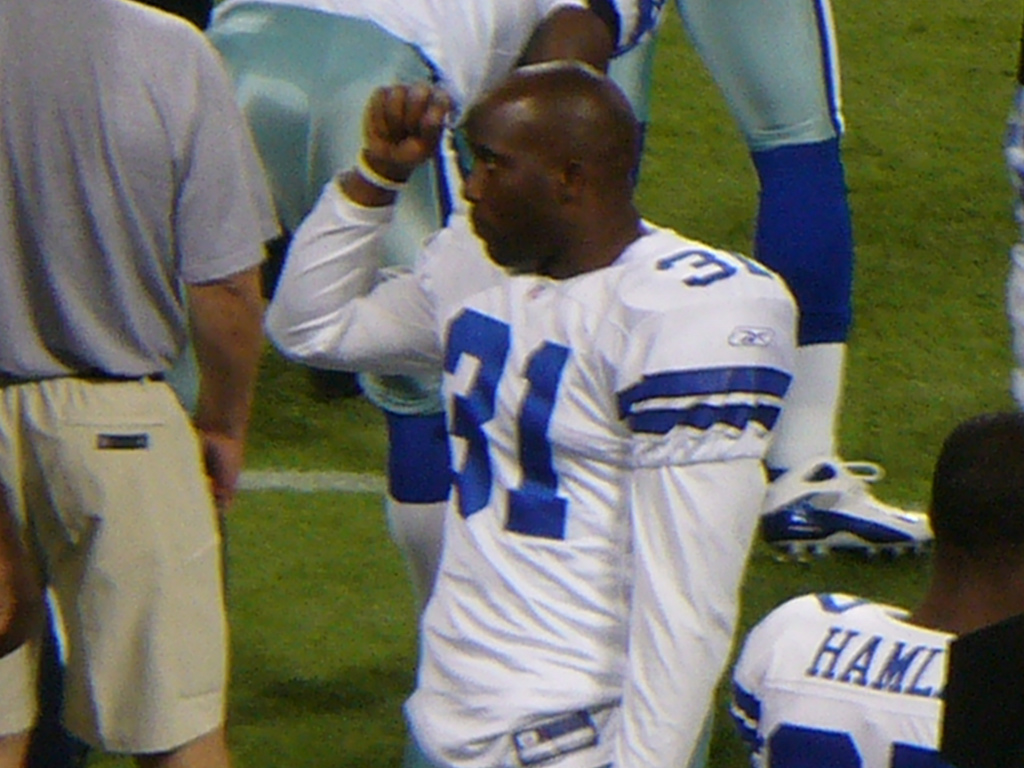
- Williams with the Dallas Cowboys in 2008

No. 31, 38
- Position: Safety

Personal information
- Born: August 14, 1980 (age 46); Redwood City, California, U.S.
- Listed height: 6 ft 0 in (1.83 m)
- Listed weight: 222 lb (101 kg)

Career information
- High school: Logan (Union City, California)
- College: Oklahoma (1998–2001)
- NFL draft: 2002: 1st round, 8th overall pick

Career history
- Dallas Cowboys (2002–2008); Cincinnati Bengals (2009–2010)

Awards and highlights
- First-team All-Pro (2003); 5× Pro Bowl (2003–2007); PFWA All-Rookie Team (2002); BCS national champion (2000); Bronko Nagurski Trophy (2001); Jim Thorpe Award (2001); Jack Tatum Trophy (2001); Unanimous All-American (2001); Big 12 Defensive Player of the Year (2001); 2× First-team All-Big 12 (2000, 2001)

Career NFL statistics
- Total tackles: 593
- Sacks: 7.5
- Forced fumbles: 9
- Fumble recoveries: 11
- Interceptions: 20
- Defensive touchdowns: 3
- Stats at Pro Football Reference
- College Football Hall of Fame

Roy Lee Williams (born August 14, 1980) is an American former professional football player who was a safety in the National Football League (NFL) for nine seasons. He played college football for the Oklahoma Sooners, earning unanimous All-American honors. He was selected by the Dallas Cowboys eighth overall in the 2002 NFL draft, where he earned five straight Pro Bowl selections from 2003 to 2007. He spent the last two years of his career with the Cincinnati Bengals, before retiring in 2011.

Williams is considered by some to be one of the most violent hitters in football during his playing career, and sometimes received criticism for his perceived “dirty” play-style, particularly of his use of the horse-collar tackle. Williams is currently a sideline reporter for Oklahoma football games.

== Early life ==
Williams was born in Redwood City, California. He graduated from James Logan High School in Union City, California, where he played quarterback, wide receiver and defensive back for the Logan Colts high school football.

== College career ==
Williams attended the University of Oklahoma, and played for coach Bob Stoops's Oklahoma Sooners football team from 1999 to 2001. He was a starter on the undefeated 2000 Oklahoma Sooners team that won the BCS National Championship, setting a school record for tackles for a loss by a defensive back with 12.

In 2001, his junior season at Oklahoma, he won the Bronko Nagurski Trophy as the nation's top overall defensive player and also won the Jim Thorpe Award as the nation's top defensive back, while leading the team to a 10–2 record and a win over the Arkansas Razorbacks in the Cotton Bowl Classic. He was named Big 12 Defensive Player of the Year and a first-team Big 12 selection, and recognized as a unanimous first-team All-American. Williams decided to forgo his final year of eligibility to enter the NFL draft.

Nicknamed "Superman" while at Oklahoma, Williams is remembered at OU for his actions in the 2001 Red River Shootout. The Sooners led 7–3 with only minutes remaining as the Longhorns offense took the field, hoping to execute a game-winning drive. With Texas forced to begin their drive inside their own 5-yard line, the Sooners prepared to pressure UT quarterback Chris Simms. Williams timed the snap perfectly. Simms barely had time to pull back from center when Williams came flying in from the blindside over the top of a Longhorn running back who barely had time to rise out of his stance. The jarring and unexpected hit knocked the ball loose and into the hands of linebacker Teddy Lehman, who stepped into the endzone for a touchdown and sealed the game for Oklahoma.

This play has been immortalized on a mural plaque at the Roy Williams Strength and Speed Complex at the University of Oklahoma. The complex is named for Williams both for his athletic achievements and for his donation of approximately $100,000 towards its construction.

== Professional career ==
Pre-draft measurables
| Height | Weight | Arm length | Hand span | 40-yard dash | 10-yard split | 20-yard split | Vertical jump | Broad jump | Bench press |
|---|---|---|---|---|---|---|---|---|---|
| 6 ft 0 3/8 in (1.84 m) | 219 lb (99 kg) | 32 1/2 in (0.83 m) | 10 1/2 in (0.27 m) | 4.53 s | 1.60 s | 2.61 s | 30.5 in (0.77 m) | 9 ft 7 in (2.92 m) | 13 reps |
All values from NFL Combine

=== Dallas Cowboys ===
Williams was selected by the Dallas Cowboys in the first round with the eighth overall pick of the 2002 NFL draft after a trade with the Kansas City Chiefs. He was known throughout the league for his hard hitting and his tackling skills during running plays. With the arrival of Ken Hamlin from Seattle, Williams had the luxury to move closer to the line of scrimmage to blitz and cover short passes during nickel or dime situations.

As a rookie in 2002, he was moved to free safety in order to play alongside strong safety Darren Woodson. However, the Cowboys defensive scheme that year allowed both players to interchange positions so as to confuse opposing offenses. He tied the franchise single-season record for most interceptions returned for touchdowns with two. Williams was also the runner-up for Defensive Rookie of the Year.

In 2003, Williams with the mentoring of Woodson, enjoyed a stellar season and his first trip to the Pro Bowl as he was part of the Cowboys' number one ranked defense and helped lead the team to its first playoff game since 1999.

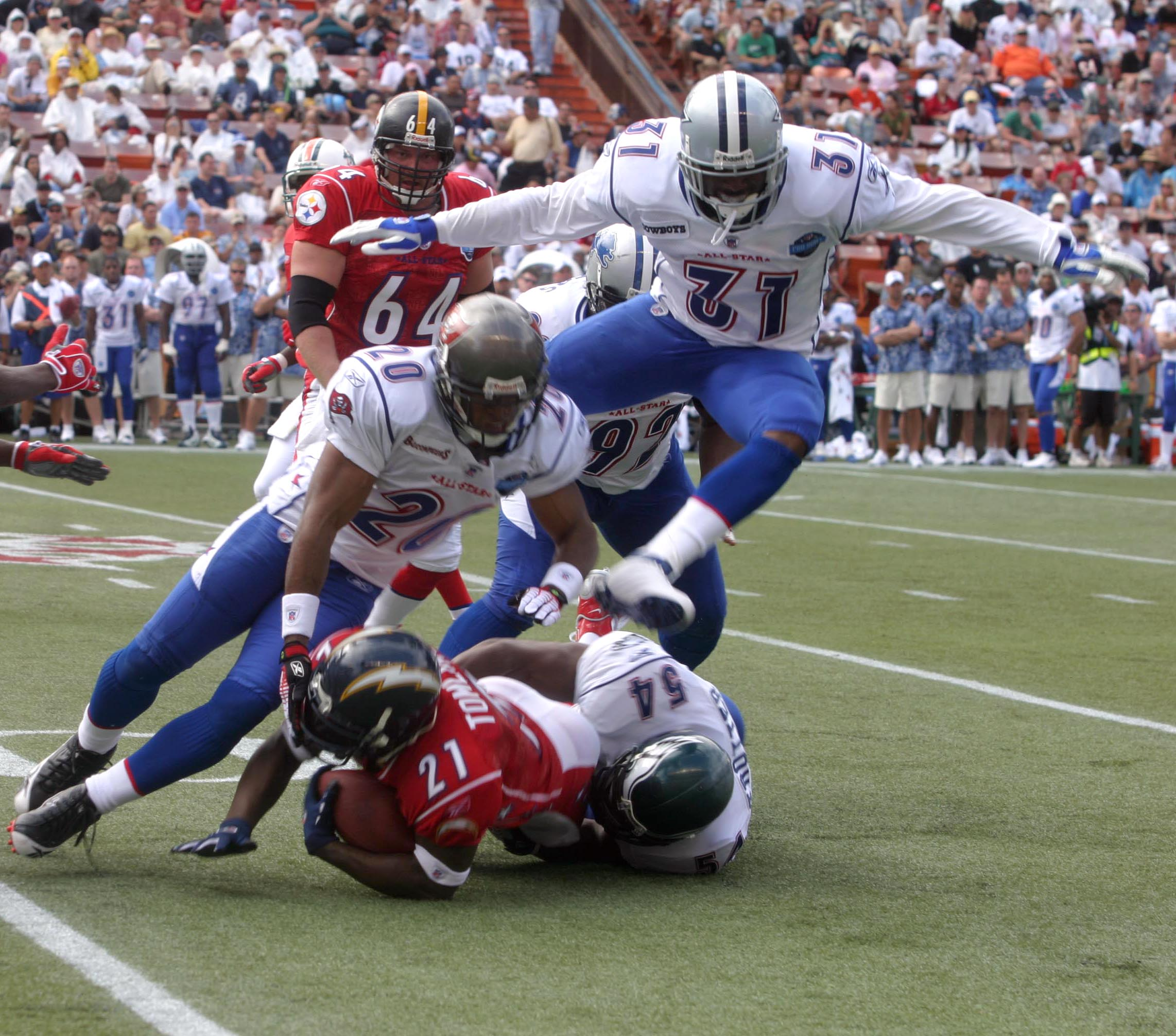
Williams (upper right) during the 2006 Pro Bowl.

In 2004, Woodson suffered a herniated disc in training camp and was forced to sit on the sidelines. Williams' struggles were more apparent as he was forced to play more coverage due to the inexperience and inconsistency of the Dallas cornerback position. After the season, the horse-collar tackle was banned. This action is now referred to as the "Roy Williams Rule", as the rule was introduced the 2004 season, during which Williams used the technique on plays that resulted in three significant injuries.

Williams is occasionally referred to by fans as "Biscuit", in reference to a statement in a 2003 press conference by former head coach Bill Parcells who, noting Williams' weight, said that he was "a biscuit short of a linebacker".

With the right cornerback position stabilized by the free agent signing of Anthony Henry in 2005, Williams was once again able to play to his best strength by roaming closer to the line of scrimmage. At the end of the 2005 NFL regular season, Williams had 2.5 sacks and three interceptions. He earned his third Pro Bowl berth in 2005 and remained a dominant force for the Dallas defense.

In early August 2006 the Dallas Cowboys signed Williams to a four-year contract extension worth $25.2 million to keep him with the team through the 2010 season.

On December 17, 2007, Williams was issued a one-game suspension without pay from Commissioner Roger Goodell. He received it for a repeat offense violating the league's horse-collar tackle rule. During the season, Cowboys teammates Terrell Owens and Patrick Crayton criticized him for his continued use of the horse-collar tackle. After the 2007 season, Williams was named to the Pro Bowl on January 3, 2008, for the fifth straight time, this time as a replacement for the late Sean Taylor (who played for the Cowboys' heated rivals, the Washington Redskins).

Williams announced that he would be wearing No. 38 at the start of the 2008 season because that was the number he wore in college and also "8" in the Bible signifies a new beginning. Teammate Greg Ellis, speaking on Sirius NFL Radio, said that Williams told him he felt like he did not fit in head coach Wade Phillips' defensive scheme. Ellis added he was bothered by the way Williams had been isolating himself from other Cowboys, and Williams "just doesn't fit what's going on here in Dallas right now." The Cowboys hired new DBs coach Dave Campo, hoping this would help Williams create more turnovers, after Williams failed to achieve any sacks or forced fumbles since 2005.

Williams broke his forearm in the second game of the year against the Philadelphia Eagles. He missed four games, then on his first game back against the St. Louis Rams, he refractured the same forearm and was forced to miss the entire season on injured reserve.

On October 14, 2008, the Cowboys acquired wide receiver Roy E. Williams from the Detroit Lions, making the two Pro Bowl players with identical names teammates.

On March 5, 2009, the Cowboys released Williams, per his request.

=== Cincinnati Bengals ===
Williams signed with the Cincinnati Bengals on May 6, 2009.

He was placed on season-ending injured reserve on November 13, 2009, due to a forearm fracture after recording 28 tackles. On March 13, 2010, Williams signed a one-year contract to stay with the Bengals. He recorded 59 tackles, a sack, and an interception of Ben Roethlisberger that year.

=== NFL statistics ===
| Year | Team | GP | TOTAL | SOLO | AST | SACK | FF | FR | FR YDS | INT | IR YDS | AVG IR | LNG IR | TD | PD |
|---|---|---|---|---|---|---|---|---|---|---|---|---|---|---|---|
| 2002 | DAL | 16 | 99 | 88 | 11 | 2.0 | 3 | 3 | 0 | 5 | 90 | 18 | 85 | 2 | 8 |
| 2003 | DAL | 16 | 72 | 55 | 17 | 2.0 | 2 | 1 | 0 | 2 | 69 | 35 | 39 | 0 | 8 |
| 2004 | DAL | 16 | 98 | 73 | 21 | 0.0 | 1 | 0 | 0 | 2 | 53 | 27 | 33 | 0 | 10 |
| 2005 | DAL | 16 | 81 | 69 | 12 | 2.5 | 3 | 1 | 0 | 3 | 52 | 17 | 46 | 1 | 10 |
| 2006 | DAL | 16 | 62 | 52 | 10 | 0.0 | 0 | 2 | 0 | 5 | 33 | 7 | 27 | 0 | 14 |
| 2007 | DAL | 15 | 95 | 73 | 19 | 0.0 | 0 | 1 | 0 | 2 | 10 | 5 | 10 | 0 | 5 |
| 2008 | DAL | 3 | 6 | 4 | 2 | 0.0 | 0 | 0 | 0 | 0 | 0 | 0 | 0 | 0 | 0 |
| 2009 | CIN | 4 | 28 | 19 | 9 | 0.0 | 0 | 0 | 0 | 0 | 0 | 0 | 0 | 0 | 2 |
| 2010 | CIN | 12 | 59 | 38 | 21 | 1.0 | 0 | 3 | 1 | 1 | 0 | 0 | 0 | 0 | 1 |
| Career | | 114 | 601 | 471 | 122 | 7.5 | 9 | 11 | 0 | 20 | 307 | 15 | 85 | 3 | 58 |

=== Retirement ===
On August 24, 2011, Williams announced his retirement, taking a job as a sideline reporter for Oklahoma Sooners football games. He also appeared on the television show Storage Wars: Texas on A&E. He joined the cast in season 1, episode 10 and returned for five episodes in season 2.

== Personal life ==
In July 2004, Williams started the Roy Williams Safety Net Foundation which was inspired by his sister Alecia, a single mother raising a young son. The Foundation's purpose is to help ensure low-income single mothers receive support, guidance, and assistance to enhance their quality of life.

Williams was engaged to singer Kelly Rowland for a year. Williams' aunt is Vecepia Towery, the winner of Survivor: Marquesas. Williams has three children with his wife Kristy, whom he has known since middle school.
