= Mike Jenkins (American football) =

German-born American football player (born 1985)

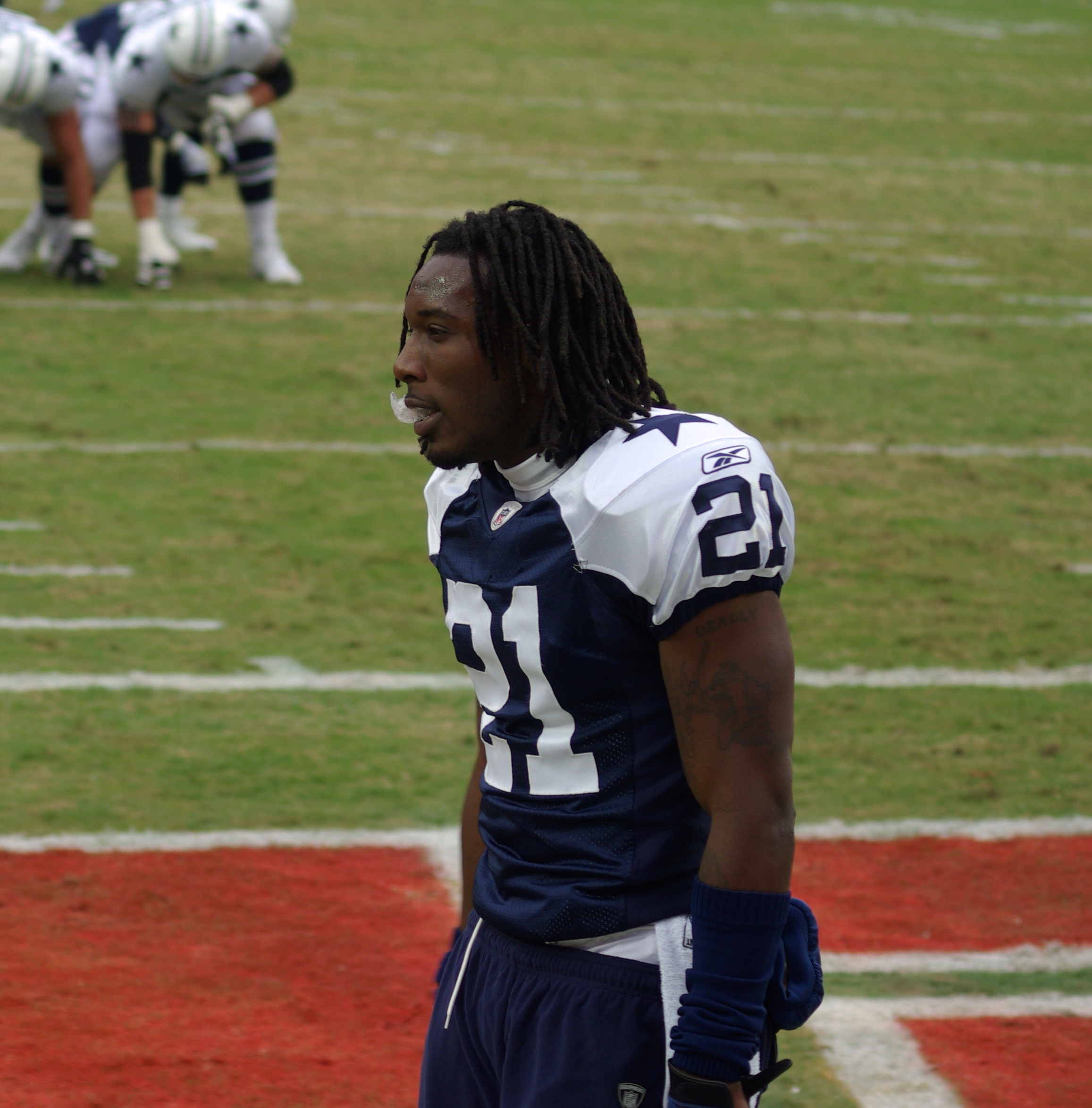
- Jenkins with the Dallas Cowboys in 2010

No. 31, 21, 24
- Position: Cornerback

Personal information
- Born: March 22, 1985 (age 41); Neuenburg am Rhein, West Germany
- Listed height: 5 ft 10 in (1.78 m)
- Listed weight: 197 lb (89 kg)

Career information
- High school: Southeast (Bradenton, Florida, U.S.)
- College: South Florida (2003–2007)
- NFL draft: 2008: 1st round, 25th overall pick

Career history
- Dallas Cowboys (2008–2012); Oakland Raiders (2013); Tampa Bay Buccaneers (2014–2015); Arizona Cardinals (2016)

Awards and highlights
- Pro Bowl (2009); First-team All-American (2007); First-team All-Big East (2007); Second-team All-Big East (2006)

Career NFL statistics
- Total tackles: 244
- Forced fumbles: 2
- Fumble recoveries: 1
- Pass deflections: 54
- Interceptions: 10
- Defensive touchdowns: 1
- Stats at Pro Football Reference

Mike Jenkins (born March 22, 1985) is an American former professional football player who was a cornerback in the National Football League (NFL). He played college football for the South Florida Bulls, earning All-American honors. He was selected by the Dallas Cowboys in the first round of the 2008 NFL draft. He also played in the NFL for the Oakland Raiders, Tampa Bay Buccaneers, and Arizona Cardinals.

== Early life ==
Jenkins was born in Neuenburg am Rhein, Baden-Württemberg, West Germany; his mother was a computer operator with the United States Army stationed in West Germany and left the Army when Jenkins was five. Jenkins's mother separated from his father in 1990, moved to Florida, and divorced in 1995, when he was ten.

Jenkins played high school football as a safety and running back at Southeast High School, receiving Class 3A all-state and Sarasota Herald-Tribune Defensive Player of the Year honors. He also lettered in track and field.

== College career ==
While attending the University of South Florida, Jenkins played for the South Florida Bulls football team and also ran track. He became a starter as a sophomore, registering 38 tackles, two interceptions, five passes defensed, and two forced fumbles. The next year, he recorded 27 tackles, 15 passes defensed, and one interception and was named second-team Big East.

In 2007, he finished with career-highs in tackles (41), interceptions (three), tackles for loss (four) and passes defensed (16). He was a first-team Big East Conference selection and received first-team All-American honors from the American Football Coaches Association.

He finished his college career with 133 tackles (six for loss), a school-record 47 passes defensed, six interceptions and five forced fumbles. He was also a kickoff returner, scoring a touchdown on a 100-yard return as a senior.

== Professional career ==
Pre-draft measurables
Height	Weight	Arm length	Hand span	40-yard dash	10-yard split	20-yard split	20-yard shuttle	Three-cone drill	Vertical jump	Broad jump	Bench press
5 ft 10 1/4 in (1.78 m)	197 lb (89 kg)	32 1/8 in (0.82 m)	9 1/4 in (0.23 m)	4.38 s	1.54 s	2.55 s	4.40 s	7.21 s	34.0 in (0.86 m)	9 ft 9 in (2.97 m)	18 reps
All values from NFL Combine

=== Dallas Cowboys ===
==== 2008 season ====
The Dallas Cowboys traded up with the Seattle Seahawks moving from the 28th to the 25th position, in exchange for a fifth (#163-Owen Schmitt) and seventh (#235-Brandon Coutu) round draft choice, in order to select Jenkins in the first round of the 2008 NFL draft. On July 26, he signed a $9.725 million contract with $6.75 million guaranteed, including a $3.1 million signing bonus.

He was used mainly as a slot cornerback, starting three of his 14 games played. He finished the season with 22 tackles (17 solo), six passes defensed and one interception (returned for a touchdown).

==== 2009 season ====
In 2009, Jenkins and fellow cornerback Orlando Scandrick competed in training camp and in the beginning of the regular season for the starter position. In week 3 against the Carolina Panthers he registered an interception, which helped him earn the starting job over Scandrick who focused on the slot corner position. He also established himself as a coverage corner by intercepting three passes in his first few starts. In a playoff loss to the Minnesota Vikings, he was ineffective on two plays, allowing wide receiver Sidney Rice to score two touchdowns.

Jenkins finished the 2009 seasons with five interceptions (tied for 12th in the NFL), 23 passes defensed, and 49 total tackles and was selected as an alternate to the 2009 Pro Bowl. He moved to the official line-up on January 25, 2010 when Minnesota Vikings cornerback Antoine Winfield withdrew due to injury.

==== 2010 season ====
Jenkins recorded 55 total tackles, 15 passes defensed (led the team), one forced fumble, and one interception, while starting every game of the season.

==== 2011 season ====
Jenkins suffered a neck stinger in training camp and missed the entire 2011 preseason. He came back from the injury and started 12 games for the Cowboys (missing four games with a hamstring injury), including the first seven games, in an injury-plagued season. Jenkins fought through several injuries, including a hamstring strain, a sore shoulder and knee and a dislocated right shoulder that required off-season surgery. Overcoming the injuries, Jenkins managed to have a solid season recording 22 tackles, 10 passes defensed (led the team) and one interception.

==== 2012 season ====
Entering the final year of Jenkins's rookie contract (which paid him around $1.05 million), the Dallas Cowboys drafted cornerback, Morris Claiborne, with the 6th overall pick in the 2012 NFL draft. The presence of Claiborne added yet another talented defensive back for the Cowboys with newly signed free agent Brandon Carr and veteran Orlando Scandrick. The Cowboys selecting Claiborne sparked immediate media speculation as to his future with the team, since Scandrick had also received a contract extension and Jenkins was on the final year of his contract.

He skipped the voluntary 2012 Organized Team Activities (OTAs) while rehabbing from shoulder surgery allegedly because he was unhappy with his current contract and his place on the team's depth chart.

Jenkins was supposedly hopeful he would be traded from the Cowboys and the Indianapolis Colts allegedly showed interest in him. The Dallas Cowboys' management repeatedly stated publicly they would not trade Jenkins and allegedly turned down several offers. In the first day of training camp, Jenkins clarified that he did not ask the Cowboys to be traded.

Because of his contract dispute, he decided to rehab his injured right shoulder outside of the team's training facilities, which delayed his recovery time, forcing him to miss all of the 2012 off-season and preseason action. Jenkins was cleared to practice by his doctor about a week before the season opener and lost his starter job to Claiborne. He played in 13 games (two starts), and recorded 14 tackles (10 solo) and three passes defensed. At the end of the season, the team did not offer Jenkins a second contract because of the investment they made in Claiborne and Carr.

=== Oakland Raiders ===
He signed a one-year contract with the Oakland Raiders on April 8, 2013 as a free agent, after not receiving the kind of deal he was expecting. He was named the starter at left cornerback and compiled 15 starts (missed one game with a hamstring injury), 75 tackles, eight passes defensed, and two interceptions (tied for the team lead).

=== Tampa Bay Buccaneers ===
==== 2014 season ====
Jenkins signed as a free agent with the Tampa Bay Buccaneers on March 20, 2014. The deal was a one-year contract worth up to $1.5 million. He suffered a pectoral strain on opening day against the Carolina Panthers and was placed on the injured reserve list on September 10, 2014. He appeared in only one game during his first season in Tampa Bay.

==== 2015 season ====
On March 5, 2015, Jenkins signed a one-year, $825,000 contract offer to remain with the Buccaneers, allowing him to return to compete to be a starter against Alterraun Verner and Johnthan Banks. He appeared in 14 games (five starts), finishing with 17 total tackles and five pass deflections in 14 games. He was not re-signed after the season.

=== Arizona Cardinals ===
On July 19, 2016, Jenkins signed with the Arizona Cardinals. On August 29, 2016 Jenkins tore his ACL in a preseason game against the Houston Texans and was placed on injured reserve. He was in the mix for Arizona's starting cornerback job opposite of Patrick Peterson before the injury.

== NFL career statistics ==
Year	Team	GP	Tackles				Fumbles			Interceptions					
Year	Team	GP	Cmb	Solo	Ast	Sck	FF	FR	Yds	Int	Yds	Avg	Lng	TD	PD
2008	DAL	14	19	19	0	0.0	0	0	0	1	23	23.0	23	1	4
2009	DAL	16	49	45	4	0.0	0	0	0	5	0	0.0	0	0	19
2010	DAL	16	55	51	4	0.0	1	0	0	1	-4	-4.0	-4	0	9
2011	DAL	12	24	22	2	0.0	0	0	0	1	3	3.0	3	0	8
2012	DAL	13	14	10	4	0.0	0	0	0	0	0	0.0	0	0	3
2013	OAK	15	65	57	8	0.0	1	1	20	2	0	0.0	0	0	6
2014	TB	1	1	1	0	0.0	0	0	0	0	0	0.0	0	0	0
2015	TB	14	17	16	1	0.0	0	0	0	0	0	0.0	0	0	5
Career		101	244	221	23	0.0	2	1	0	10	22	2.2	23	1	54
