= Morris Claiborne =

American football player (born 1990)

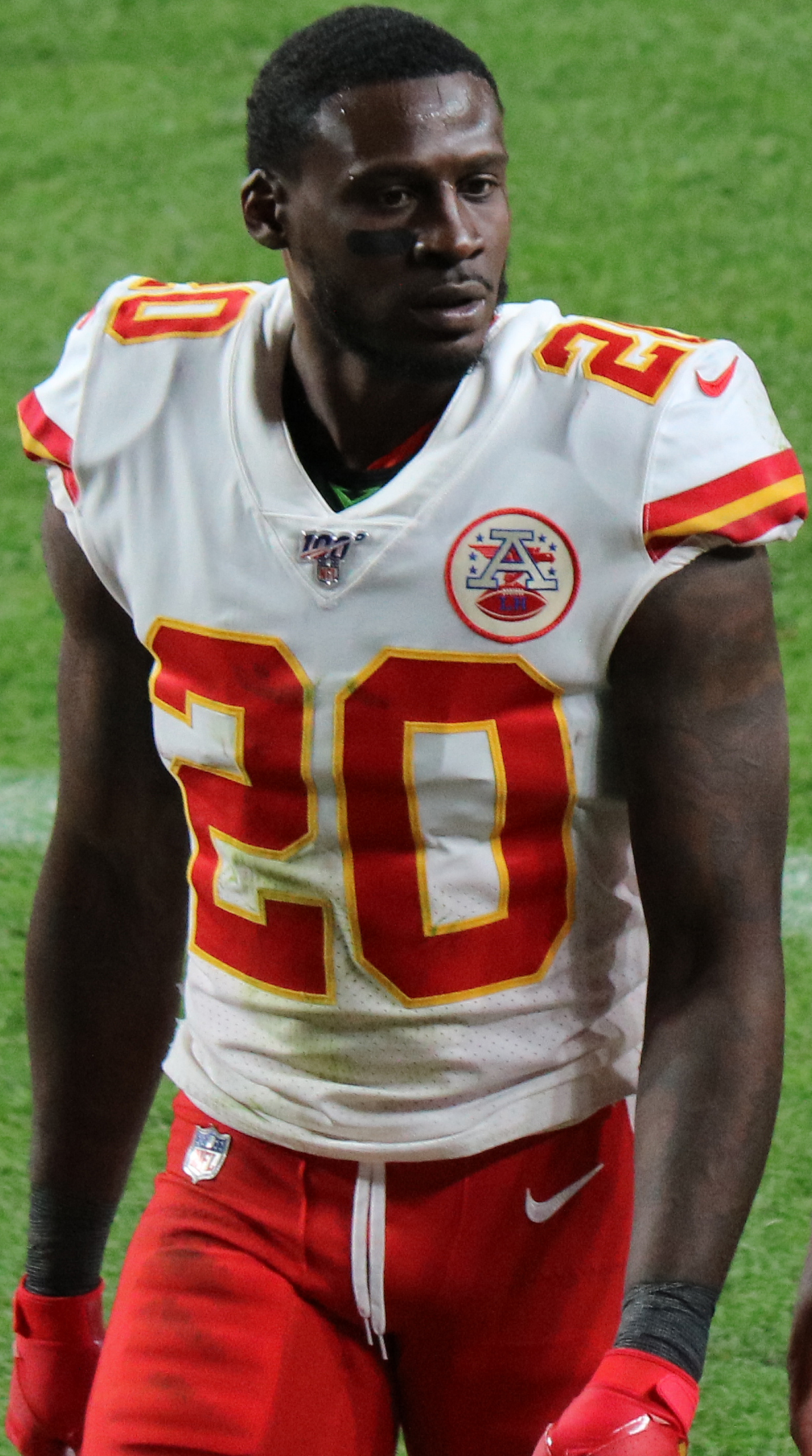
- Claiborne with the Kansas City Chiefs in 2019

No. 24, 21, 20
- Position: Cornerback

Personal information
- Born: February 7, 1990 (age 36); Shreveport, Louisiana, U.S.
- Listed height: 5 ft 11 in (1.80 m)
- Listed weight: 192 lb (87 kg)

Career information
- High school: Fair Park (Shreveport)
- College: LSU (2009–2011)
- NFL draft: 2012: 1st round, 6th overall pick

Career history
- Dallas Cowboys (2012–2016); New York Jets (2017–2018); Kansas City Chiefs (2019)

Awards and highlights
- Super Bowl champion (LIV); Jim Thorpe Award (2011); SEC Defensive Player of the Year (2011); Unanimous All-American (2011); First-team All-SEC (2011); Second-team All-SEC (2010)

Career NFL statistics
- Total tackles: 265
- Pass deflections: 49
- Interceptions: 7
- Forced fumbles: 1
- Fumble recoveries: 4
- Defensive touchdowns: 1
- Stats at Pro Football Reference

Morris Lee Claiborne (born February 7, 1990) is an American former professional football player who was a cornerback in the National Football League (NFL) for eight seasons. He played college football for the LSU Tigers, winning the Jim Thorpe Award as the best defensive back in the country and was recognized as a unanimous All-American. He was selected by the Dallas Cowboys sixth overall in the 2012 NFL draft.

== Early life ==
Claiborne was born in Shreveport, Louisiana. He attended Fair Park High School in Shreveport, where he played for the Fair Park Indians high school football team. He was a three-star recruit according to Rivals.com. He played quarterback, wide receiver, and defensive back. As a senior, he had over 2,000 all purpose yards and 30 touchdowns as a quarterback.

Claiborne was also on the school's track & field team, where he competed as a sprinter. He won the 100 meters at the 2009 Louisiana Outdoor State Championships, with a career-best time of 10.76 seconds, and also ran the fourth leg on the 4 × 100 metres relay squad, helping them earn a first-place finish at 42.06 seconds. He also placed second in the 200 meters at the 2009 Region 1-4A Championships, with a personal-best time of 22.21 seconds.

== College career ==
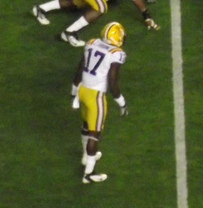
Claiborne with the LSU Tigers

Claiborne attended Louisiana State University, where he played for coach Les Miles's LSU Tigers football team from 2009 to 2011. After spending his freshman season as a backup in 2009, he started 12 games in 2010 and recorded 37 tackles and a team-leading five interceptions as a sophomore in 2010, and was named a second-team All-Southeastern Conference (SEC) selection. Following his junior season in 2011, Claiborne won the Jim Thorpe Award, given to the year's best defensive back, earned first-team All-SEC honors, and was recognized as a unanimous first-team All-American. He was named SEC Defensive Player of the Year. Claiborne registered 51 tackles, six pass breakups and six interceptions as a junior.

== Professional career ==
=== Pre-draft ===
Claiborne was not perceived as a first-round draft pick prior to his junior season. By midseason, however, he had drawn the attention of NFL scouts and analysts, having erased concerns his sophomore production resulted from playing opposite of Patrick Peterson. Towards the end of his junior season, Claiborne had established himself as one of the best cornerback prospects for the 2012 NFL draft. On January 12, 2012, Claiborne announced his decision to forgo his remaining eligibility and enter the 2012 NFL draft. Scouts for the Dallas Cowboys had Claiborne as the highest-graded cornerback in the draft since Deion Sanders. Claiborne scored a 4 out of 50 on the Wonderlic Test, which is an aptitude test given to NFL prospects to test basic intelligence. After being drafted, Claiborne admitted he "blew the test off" (the Wonderlic test) after seeing that it had "nothing on the test that came with football". Claiborne withheld surgery to repair a wrist injury until after he performed at the NFL Combine and LSU's pro day. He sustained a ligamentous injury to his wrist on November 5, 2011, but elected to play through it for the remainder of the season.

External videos
- Morris Claiborne's NFL Combine Workout
- Morris Claiborne runs the 40-yard dash
- 2012 NFL Combine: Morris Claiborne

Pre-draft measurables
Height	Weight	Arm length	Hand span	Wingspan	40-yard dash	10-yard split	20-yard split	20-yard shuttle	Three-cone drill	Vertical jump	Broad jump	Wonderlic
5 ft 11 1/8 in (1.81 m)	188 lb (85 kg)	33 1/4 in (0.84 m)	8 1/2 in (0.22 m)	6 ft 5 in (1.96 m)	4.43 s	1.56 s	2.58 s	4.12 s	7.01 s	35.0 in (0.89 m)	9 ft 10 in (3.00 m)	4
All values from NFL Combine/LSU Pro Day

=== Dallas Cowboys ===
==== 2012 ====
The Dallas Cowboys selected Claiborne in the first round (sixth overall) of the 2012 NFL draft. The Dallas Cowboys traded their first (14th overall) and second round picks (45th overall) in the 2012 NFL Draft to the St. Louis Rams and received their first round pick (6th overall) which they used to draft Claiborne. Claiborne was the first defensive back drafted in 2012 and was the Cowboys' highest draft pick since they drafted Terence Newman fifth overall in 2003.

External videos
- Cowboys draft Morris Claiborne sixth overall
- Morris Claiborne's impact in Dallas

During the pre-draft process, the Dallas Cowboys did not have a pre-draft visit with Claiborne as they "didn't think it was realistic" he would be available at 14th overall. The Dallas Cowboys' owner Jerry Jones stated Claiborne would be the only player the Cowboys would be willing to trade up for in the first round.

On July 23, 2012, the Cowboys signed Claiborne to a fully guaranteed four-year, $16.4 million contract that includes a signing bonus of $10.3 million.

Claiborne was not able to physically participate at rookie minicamp and organized team activities as he recovered from surgery on his wrist. During training camp, Claiborne competed to be a starting cornerback against Mike Jenkins. Head coach Jason Garrett named Claiborne and Brandon Carr the starting cornerbacks to begin the regular season. They began the season starting alongside free safety Gerald Sensabaugh, strong safety Barry Church, and nickelback Orlando Scandrick.

He made his professional regular season debut and first career start in the Dallas Cowboys' season-opener at the New York Giants and recorded four solo tackles during their 24–17 victory. On October 21, 2012, Claiborne recorded two combined tackles, deflected two passes, and made his first career interception as the Cowboys defeated the Carolina Panthers 19–14 in Week 7. Claiborne intercepted a pass by Panthers' quarterback Cam Newton, that was originally intended for wide receiver Louis Murphy, during the second quarter. On December 9, 2012, Claiborne sustained laceration to his face during the third quarter of the Cowboys' 20–19 victory at the Cincinnati Bengals in Week 14. The following week, he was inactive and missed the Cowboys' 27–24 win against the Pittsburgh Steelers in Week 15. In Week 16, he collected a season-high ten combined tackles (nine solo) and deflected two passes during a 34–31 loss to the New Orleans Saints. He finished his rookie season in 2012 with 55 combined tackles (43 solo), eight pass deflections, and one interception in 15 games and 15 starts.

==== 2013 ====
On January 8, 2013, the Dallas Cowboys announced their decision to fire defensive coordinator Rob Ryan after they finished 19th in the league in points allowed and 24th in yards allowed in 2012. On January 11, 2013, the Dallas Cowboys hired USC assistant head coach Monte Kiffin to be their new defensive coordinator. Kiffin installed a base 4-3 defense with an emphasis on the Tampa 2 defensive scheme. Claiborne gained eight pounds during the off-season as the Tampa 2 defense placed an emphasis on press coverages. Claiborne entered training camp slated as a starting cornerback, but sustained numerous injuries that delayed his progress. On July 25, 2013, it was reported that Claiborne had dislocated his pinkie during a one-on-one drill. During training camp, Claiborne jammed his knee and was the sidelined for the rest of camp and the entire preseason.

He started in the Dallas Cowboys' season-opener against the New York Giants and recorded three solo tackles before exiting in the third quarter of their 36–31 victory. Claiborne injured his left shoulder while attempting to tackle Giants' tight end Brandon Myers. In Week 4, he collected a season-high seven combined tackles (six solo) during a 30–21 loss at the San Diego Chargers. On October 1, 2013, it was reported that the Cowboys had chosen to demote Claiborne to being the third cornerback after he struggled and was replaced by Orlando Scandrick. Despite his demotion, five days later, Claiborne recorded his lone interception of the season, intercepting Peyton Manning, during a 51–48 loss to the Denver Broncos in Week 5. This was Manning’s first interception thrown of the season, having not thrown one through the first four games, while in the midst of a record-breaking passing season. Claiborne sustained a hamstring injury that sidelined him for two games (Weeks 9–10). In Week 12, Claiborne returned, but further aggravated his hamstring injury during the Cowboys' 24–21 win at the New York Giants. Claiborne missed four consecutive games (Weeks 13–16) and explained his rehabilitation was delayed due to the death of his father and birth of his daughter. He finished the season with 26 combined tackles (24 solo), five pass deflections, and one interception in ten games and seven starts.

==== 2014 ====
On January 28, 2014, the Dallas Cowboys announced their decision to promote defensive line coach Rod Marinelli to defensive coordinator. Former defensive coordinator Monte Kiffin was named assistant head coach. Claiborne competed against Orlando Scandrick to be a starting cornerback during training camp. Claiborne missed most of the preseason due to knee tendinitis and an AC joint separation. Head coach Jason Garrett named Claiborne and Brandon Carr the starting cornerback tandem to begin the regular season after Orlando Scandrick was suspended for the first two games. On September 21, 2014, Claiborne recorded a season-high three solo tackles, deflected a pass, and made an interception during a 34–31 victory at the St. Louis Rams in Week 3.

He returned to a reserve role after the third game, even though he made the interception that clinched the win. When told of his demotion from the coaches on September 23, he walked out of the Cowboys' practice facility but returned later that night. On September 28, 2014, Claiborne tore a patellar tendon in his left knee during a 38–17 victory against the New Orleans Saints. On September 30, 2014, the Dallas Cowboys officially placed Claiborne on injured reserve for the remainder of the season. He finished the 2014 NFL season with seven combined tackles (five solo), two pass deflections, and one interception in four games and three starts.

==== 2015 ====
Claiborne rehabbed his potential career-threatening injury and progressed better than expected, regaining his previous form and being able to avoid missing time in training camp. Throughout training camp, Claiborne competed to be a starting cornerback against Brandon Carr, Orlando Scandrick, and Byron Jones. Head coach Jason Garrett named Claiborne and Brandon Carr the starting cornerbacks to begin the regular season after Orlando Scandrick tore his ACL and MCL during the preseason.

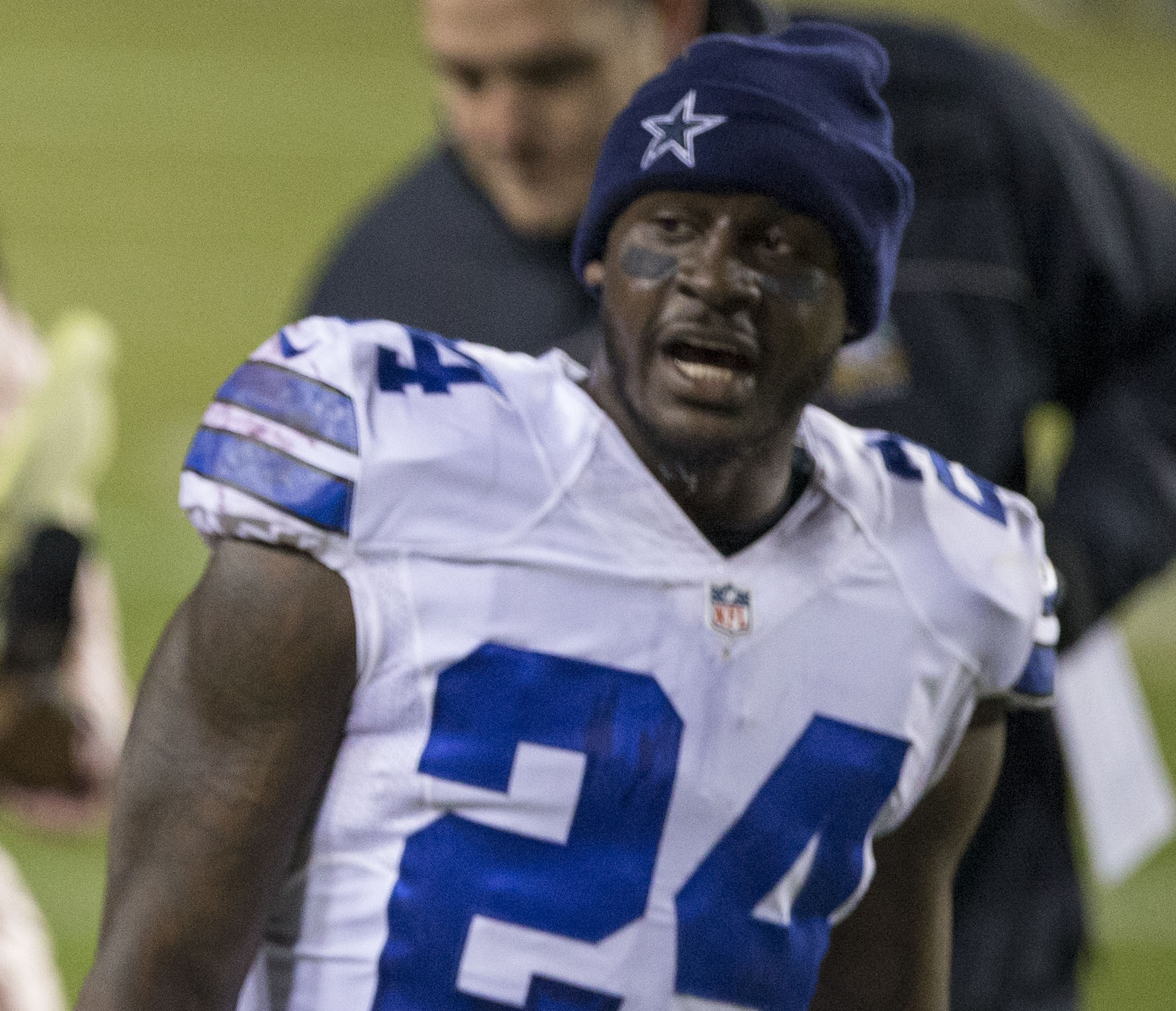
Claiborne with the Dallas Cowboys in 2015

In Week 3, he collected a season-high five solo tackles and broke up a pass during a 39–28 loss to the Atlanta Falcons. Claiborne was inactive for two games (Weeks 11–12) due to a hamstring and ankle injury. He re-injured his hamstring and was sidelined for the last three games (Weeks 15–17) of the regular season. Claiborne finished the 2015 NFL season with 37 combined tackles (30 solo) and seven pass deflections in 11 games and 11 starts.

==== 2016 ====
On March 11, 2016, the Cowboys re-signed Claiborne to a one-year contract worth $3 million, that could reach a maximum of $3.75 million with incentives. In training camp, while Orlando Scandrick was out recovering from a knee injury, he earned the starting left cornerback position. During the season, he showed the potential that was expected from him since the 2012 NFL draft and had his best season with the Cowboys. In the week 4 win against the San Francisco 49ers, he played a key role in the fourth quarter with an interception and tackling wide receiver Torrey Smith short of a first down on a crucial 4th-and-6 play, getting the ball back so the Cowboys could run out the clock. In the next game, he limited All-Pro A. J. Green to four receptions for 50 yards (including a pass breakup of a sure touchdown), contributing to a 28–14 win against the Cincinnati Bengals.

Against the Green Bay Packers, Claiborne had to leave in the third quarter because of a concussion. Unfortunately in the next game after a bye, he severely injured his groin during the Cowboys' overtime win against the Philadelphia Eagles in week 8. There was a fear that the injury could require season-ending surgery, but the team decided to let it to heal on its own and not place Claiborne on the injured reserve list. After a nine-game absence, he returned for the Divisional Round playoff game against the Green Bay Packers, but he injured his ribs in the first half and had to leave the game with 10 minutes left in the third quarter.

=== New York Jets ===
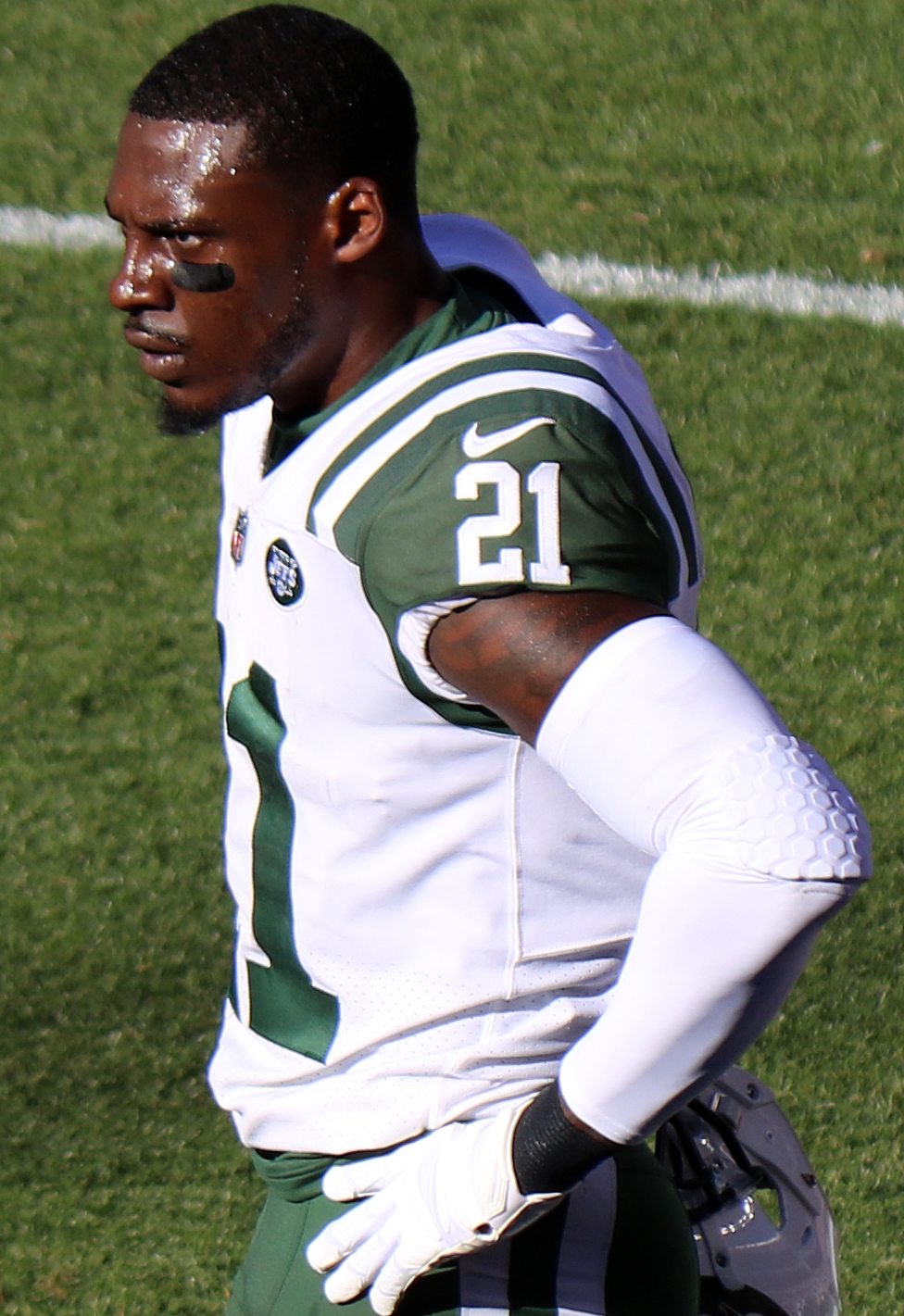
Claiborne playing for the Jets in 2017.

==== 2017 ====
On March 18, 2017, Claiborne signed a one-year contract with the New York Jets, who were looking to replace veteran Darrelle Revis at cornerback. Claiborne started 15 games in 2017, the most since his rookie year, recording 43 tackles, eight passes defensed and one interception.

==== 2018 ====
On March 15, 2018, Claiborne signed a one-year contract extension with the Jets. In Week 6, against the Indianapolis Colts, Claiborne recorded a 17-yard interception return for a touchdown against Andrew Luck in the 42–34 victory. He was placed on injured reserve on December 29, 2018, with an ankle injury. He started 15 games on the season, recording career-highs with 57 tackles, 14 passes defensed, and two interceptions. His 14 pass deflections finished first on the team and his 57 tackles finished fourth on the team.

=== Kansas City Chiefs ===
On August 8, 2019, Claiborne was signed by the Kansas City Chiefs to a one-year contract worth $1.5 million, with another $1.5 million in potential incentives. He was suspended for the first four games of the season for a violation of the league's substance abuse policy. He was reinstated from suspension on September 30, and the Chiefs received a roster exemption for him. He was activated on October 3. On February 2, 2020, the Chiefs won Super Bowl LIV, giving Claiborne his first Super Bowl ring despite being inactive for the game. He wasn't re-signed after the season.

== NFL career statistics ==
Legend
**Bold**	Career high

Year	Team	Games		Tackles				Interceptions						Fumbles			
Year	Team	GP	GS	Cmb	Solo	Ast	Sck	Int	Yds	Avg	Lng	TD	PD	FF	FR	Yds	TD
2012	DAL	15	15	55	43	12	0.0	1	0	0.0	0	0	8	**1**	**2**	**50**	**1**
2013	DAL	10	9	26	24	2	0.0	1	0	0.0	0	0	5	0	1	0	0
2014	DAL	4	3	7	5	2	0.0	1	−8	−8.0	−8	0	2	0	0	0	0
2015	DAL	11	11	37	30	7	0.0	0	0	0.0	0	0	7	0	0	0	0
2016	DAL	7	7	26	24	2	0.0	1	27	27.0	27	0	5	0	1	0	0
2017	NYJ	15	15	43	34	9	0.0	1	**28**	**28.0**	**28**	0	8	0	0	0	0
2018	NYJ	15	15	**57**	**44**	**13**	0.0	**2**	17	8.5	17T	**1**	**14**	0	0	0	0
2019	KC	8	1	14	9	5	0.0	0	0	0.0	0	0	0	0	0	0	0
Career		85	74	265	213	52	0.0	7	64	9.1	28	1	49	1	4	50	1
