= Orlando Scandrick =

American football player and sports commentator (born 1987)

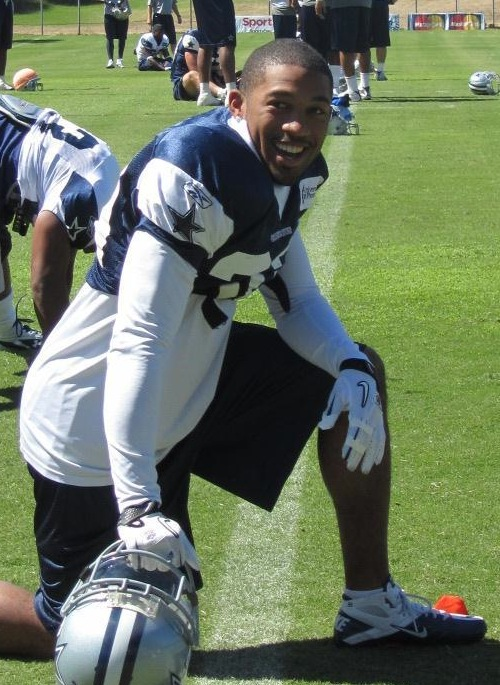
- Scandrick with the Dallas Cowboys in 2010

No. 32, 22, 38
- Position: Cornerback

Personal information
- Born: February 10, 1987 (age 39); Torrance, California, U.S.
- Listed height: 5 ft 10 in (1.78 m)
- Listed weight: 196 lb (89 kg)

Career information
- High school: Los Alamitos (Los Alamitos, California)
- College: Boise State (2005–2007)
- NFL draft: 2008: 5th round, 143rd overall pick

Career history
- Dallas Cowboys (2008–2017); Washington Redskins (2018)*; Kansas City Chiefs (2018); Philadelphia Eagles (2019)
- * Offseason or practice squad member only

Career NFL statistics
- Total tackles: 457
- Sacks: 13.5
- Forced fumbles: 10
- Pass deflections: 76
- Interceptions: 9
- Defensive touchdowns: 2
- Stats at Pro Football Reference

Orlando Lee Scandrick (born February 10, 1987) is an American former professional football player who was a cornerback in the National Football League (NFL). He played college football for the Boise State Broncos and was selected by the Dallas Cowboys in the fifth round of the 2008 NFL draft. Scandrick also played for the Kansas City Chiefs and Philadelphia Eagles.

== Early life ==
Scandrick was born in Torrance, California. He played high school football at Los Alamitos High School as a two-way player (wide receiver and cornerback). As a senior, Scandrick had 52 receptions for 832 yards and 12 touchdowns to go along with 54 tackles, three interceptions, and 1,024 kickoff return yards with a touchdown. At the end of the season, he received first-team Long Beach Dream Team and first-team All-Sunset league honors.

Scandrick accepted a scholarship to play at Boise State University, where he focused on playing cornerback. Before leaving school as a junior, he started 39 of the 40 games, had 152 tackles, 3.5 sacks, five forced fumbles. In 2007, Scandrick recorded a school single-season and career record with four blocked kicks (field goals and extra points).

== Professional career ==
=== Pre-draft ===
Scandrick attended the NFL Scouting Combine in Indianapolis, Indiana. He completed the majority of combine drills, but opted to skip the short shuttle. Scandrick was unable to perform the bench press due to a thumb injury, but was able to help his draft stock by finishing fourth among all combine participants in the 40-yard dash. On March 3, 2008, Scandrick attended Boise State's pro day, but chose to stand on his combine performance and only run defensive back and coverage drills. At the conclusion of the pre-draft process, Scandrick was projected to be a fourth-round pick. He was ranked the 16th best cornerback prospect in the draft by NFLDraftScout.com.

Pre-draft measurables
Height	Weight	Arm length	Hand span	40-yard dash	10-yard split	20-yard split	Three-cone drill	Vertical jump	Broad jump
5 ft 10 in (1.78 m)	192 lb (87 kg)	32 1/2 in (0.83 m)	9 1/2 in (0.24 m)	4.32 s	1.47 s	2.49 s	6.83 s	38.5 in (0.98 m)	10 ft 5 in (3.18 m)
All values from NFL Combine/Pro Day

=== Dallas Cowboys ===
The Dallas Cowboys selected Scandrick in the fifth round (143rd overall) of the 2008 NFL draft. The Cowboys secured the 143rd overall pick used to immediately draft Scandrick in a trade with the Jacksonville Jaguars in exchange for a fifth (155th overall) and seventh round (213th overall) selections in the 2008 NFL Draft. The Jaguars used their selections acquired in the trade to draft linebacker Thomas Williams and running back Chauncey Washington.

On July 19, 2008, the Dallas Cowboys signed Scandrick to a four-year, $1.79 million contract. Throughout training camp, he competed against Evan Oglesby, Alan Ball, and Quincy Butler for job as the dime cornerback or for a role on special teams. Head coach Wade Phillips named Scandrick the third cornerback and starting nickelback to start the regular season, behind Anthony Henry and Mike Jenkins. Adam Jones began the season with a six-game suspension and veteran Terence Newman missed multiple games due to a groin injury.

In 2011, Scandrick signed a six-year contract with the Cowboys worth $28.2 million and $10 million in guarantees. In 2013, he passed Morris Claiborne on the depth chart and became the starter at right cornerback after the third game of the season. On December 13, Scandrick signed an additional two-year contract extension.

On August 11, 2014, the NFL announced that Scandrick would be suspended for the first four games of the season for the usage of performance-enhancing drugs. Although it was confirmed that he tested positive for MDMA, during his suspension the league revised its drug policy and his punishment was reduced to two games, by changing his violation from performance enhancing to substance abuse. Scandrick made his season debut in Week 3 against the St. Louis Rams.

In 2015, Scandrick had a contract holdout and missed offseason workouts before reporting on May 18. On August 25, he tore his ACL and MCL during a training camp practice, while attempting to tackle rookie wide receiver Lucky Whitehead. Scandrick was placed on injured reserve on September 1.

In 2016, Scandrick played in 12 games with 10 starts, recording 46 tackles, two sacks, passes defensed, an interception, and three forced fumbles. He missed four games while dealing with hamstring strains.

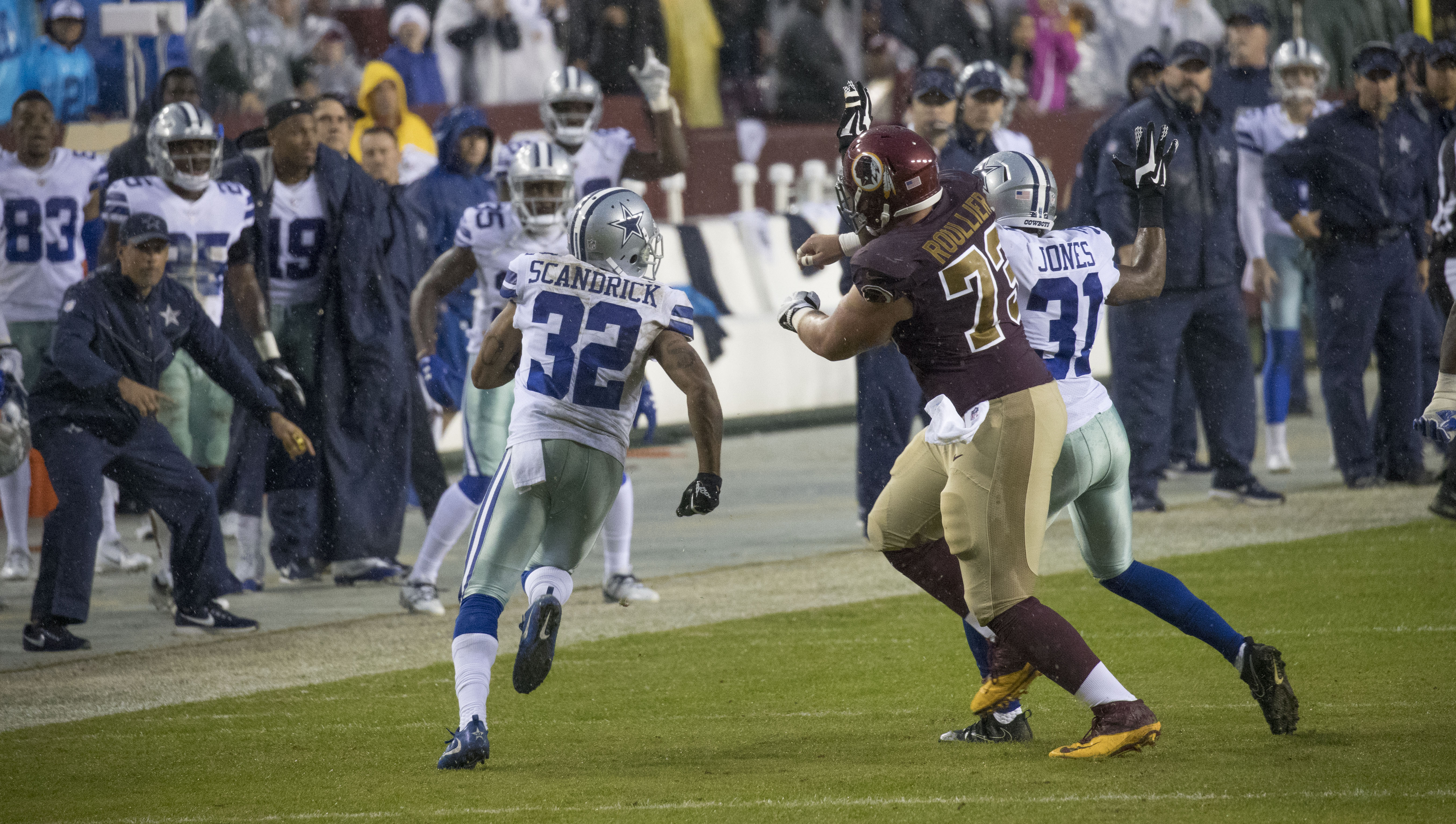
Scandrick returns a blocked field goal 88 yards against the Washington Redskins

In 2017, Scandrick missed the second game against the Denver Broncos after undergoing surgery to fix a broken hand he had in the season opener. Scandrick suffered two transverse process fractures in the twelfth game against the Washington Redskins, although he was able to return a blocked field goal for 86 yards to set up a critical touchdown. Scandrick missed the rest of the season and was placed on injured reserve on December 29. He had 11 starts, 39 tackles, and seven pass deflections.

On March 17, 2018, Scandrick was released after 10 seasons. He finished his Cowboys career with 125 games played, 422 tackles, 11.5 sacks, eight interceptions and 63 pass deflections.

=== Washington Redskins ===
On March 19, 2018, Scandrick signed a two-year contract with the Washington Redskins. He was released on August 14.

=== Kansas City Chiefs ===
Scandrick signed a one-year contract worth $1.5 million with the Kansas City Chiefs on August 19, 2018. He played in 15 games with seven starts, recording 44 combined tackles, a career-high 13 passes defensed, an interception, and a forced fumble.

=== Philadelphia Eagles ===
On July 27, 2019, Scandrick signed with the Philadelphia Eagles. He was released during final roster cuts on August 30. Scandrick was re-signed on September 27.

During Week 5 against the New York Jets, Scandrick recorded two strip sacks. On the second one, he strip-sacked Luke Falk and returned the ball for a 44-yard touchdown in the 31–6 victory. Two weeks later against his former team, the Cowboys, Scandrick was beaten in the open field by the Cowboys' Tavon Austin for a 20-yard touchdown on a jet sweep. Scandrick was released on October 21.

== NFL career statistics ==
=== Regular season ===
Year	Team	Games		Tackles				Interceptions						Fumbles			
Year	Team	GP	GS	Cmb	Solo	Ast	Sck	Int	Yds	Avg	Lng	TD	PD	FF	FR	Yds	TD
2008	DAL	16	2	36	35	1	1.0	0	0	0.0	0	0	4	0	0	0	0
2009	DAL	16	4	51	48	3	1.0	1	0	0.0	0	0	9	1	1	15	0
2010	DAL	16	3	46	31	5	2.5	1	40	40.0	40	1	9	0	0	0	0
2011	DAL	13	7	49	42	7	2.0	1	0	0.0	0	0	5	0	0	0	0
2012	DAL	11	3	21	16	5	0.0	0	0	0.0	0	0	4	0	0	0	0
2013	DAL	16	15	64	59	8	2.0	2	0	0.0	0	0	12	1	0	0	0
2014	DAL	14	14	55	50	5	1.0	2	2	1.0	2	0	9	2	0	0	0
2015	DAL	0	0	Did not play due to injury													
2016	DAL	12	10	46	39	7	2.0	1	0	0.0	0	0	8	3	0	0	0
2017	DAL	11	11	38	32	6	0.0	0	0	0.0	0	0	3	0	0	0	0
2018	KC	15	7	44	38	6	0.0	1	0	0.0	0	0	13	1	0	0	0
2019	PHI	3	1	7	6	1	0.0	0	0	0.0	0	0	0	2	1	44	1
Career		143	77	450	400	50	11.5	9	42	4.7	40	1	76	10	2	59	1

=== Postseason ===
Year	Team	Games		Tackles				Interceptions						Fumbles			
Year	Team	GP	GS	Cmb	Solo	Ast	Sck	Int	Yds	Avg	Lng	TD	PD	FF	FR	Yds	TD
2009	DAL	2	1	6	6	0	0.0	0	0	0.0	0	0	0	0	0	0	0
2014	DAL	2	2	8	6	2	0.0	0	0	0.0	0	0	0	0	0	0	0
2016	DAL	1	1	3	3	0	1.0	0	0	0.0	0	0	0	0	0	0	0
2018	KC	1	0	0	0	0	0.0	0	0	0.0	0	0	0	0	0	0	0
Career		6	4	17	15	2	1.0	0	0	0.0	0	0	0	0	0	0	0

== Personal life ==
Scandrick is a father to twin daughters from a previous relationship and two sons with former model turned fashion designer Draya Michele and the second from WNBA player Dearica Hamby.
