= Tyler Everett =

American gridiron football player (born 1983)

No. 6, 22, 37
- Position: Safety

Personal information
- Born: November 4, 1983 (age 43); Canton, Ohio, U.S.
- Listed height: 5 ft 11 in (1.80 m)
- Listed weight: 205 lb (93 kg)

Career information
- High school: McKinley (Canton)
- College: Ohio State
- NFL draft: 2006: undrafted

Career history
- Denver Broncos (2006)*; Chicago Bears (2006); Minnesota Vikings (2007)*; Dallas Cowboys (2007–2008)*; Edmonton Eskimos (2009)*
- * Offseason or practice squad member only

Awards and highlights
- BCS national champion (2002)

Career NFL statistics
- Games played: 3
- Stats at Pro Football Reference

Tyler Scott Everett (born November 4, 1983) is an American former professional football player who was a safety in the National Football League (NFL) for the Chicago Bears and Minnesota Vikings. He was signed by the Denver Broncos as an undrafted free agent in 2006. He played college football for the Ohio State Buckeyes.

== Early life ==
Everett attended Canton McKinley High School, where he played as a running back and defensive back. As a junior, he rushed for over 1,300 yards. As a senior, he received All-Ohio honors as a defensive back.

He accepted a football scholarship from Ohio State University. As a freshman, he was a backup and was part of the 2002 National Championship team. As a senior, he appeared in 10 games with 9 starts, collecting 33 tackles, one sack, one interception and 2 passes defensed.

He finished his college career with 48 games (16 starts), 102 tackles, 4 interceptions, 13 passes defensed, one forced fumble and one fumble recovery.

== Professional career ==
=== Denver Broncos ===
Everett was signed as an undrafted free agent by the Denver Broncos after the 2006 NFL draft on May 3. He was waived before the start of the season.

=== Chicago Bears ===
In 2006, he was signed to the Chicago Bears' practice squad where he spent the first 13 weeks of the season. On December 12, he was promoted to the active roster in order to bolster the safety position following injuries to Mike Brown and Todd Johnson. He was active in 3 games, but did not record any stats. The team would go on to play in Super Bowl XLI. He was released on September 1, 2007.

If the Chicago Bears had won Super Bowl XLI, Everett would have won a championship at the high school, college and professional levels. As they lost, this honor went to fellow Canton McKinley High School and Ohio State graduate, Colt safety Mike Doss.

=== Minnesota Vikings ===
On September 3, 2007, he was signed to the practice squad of the Minnesota Vikings, where he spent the rest of the season.

=== Dallas Cowboys ===
On January 15, 2008, he was signed as a free agent by the Dallas Cowboys. He was released on August 28.

=== Edmonton Eskimos ===
On May 26, 2009, he signed with the Edmonton Eskimos of the Canadian Football League. He was released on June 6.
