= Daniel Polk =

American football player (born 1985)

Profile
- Position: Wide receiver

Personal information
- Born: May 19, 1985 (age 41); Dallas, Texas
- Listed height: 6 ft 2 in (1.88 m)
- Listed weight: 202 lb (92 kg)

Career information
- College: Midwestern State
- NFL draft: 2008: undrafted

Career history
- Dallas Cowboys (2008)*
- * Offseason or practice squad member only

Daniel Polk (born May 19, 1985, in Dallas, Texas) is an American former football wide receiver. He was signed by the Cowboys as an undrafted free agent in 2008 but was cut by the team on August 25, 2008. He played college football for the Midwestern State Mustangs. He was also featured on HBO's television program Hard Knocks as the last player cut from the team. Polk was a First-team Daktronics All-American QB. He was the only player in D-II to pass for over 2,000 yards and run for 1,000 yards. Polk holds numerous records at Midwestern State University. Polk was picked up by NFL team New Orleans Saints, but refused the offer.
