= Julius Crosslin =

American football player (1983–2023)

Profile
- Position: Fullback

Personal information
- Born: November 1, 1983; Amarillo, Texas, U.S.
- Died: July 15, 2023 (aged 39); Stillwater, Oklahoma, U.S.
- Listed height: 5 ft 11 in (1.80 m)
- Listed weight: 245 lb (111 kg)

Career information
- High school: Palo Duro (Amarillo)
- College: Oklahoma State
- NFL draft: 2008: undrafted

Career history
- Dallas Cowboys (2008–2009)*
- * Offseason or practice squad member only

Julius Crosslin (November 1, 1983 – July 15, 2023) was an American professional football player who was a fullback for the Dallas Cowboys of the National Football League (NFL). He played college football for the Oklahoma State Cowboys. He was signed by Dallas as an undrafted free agent in 2008.

Crosslin died on July 15, 2023, at the age of 39.
