= Ken Hamlin =

American football player (born 1981)

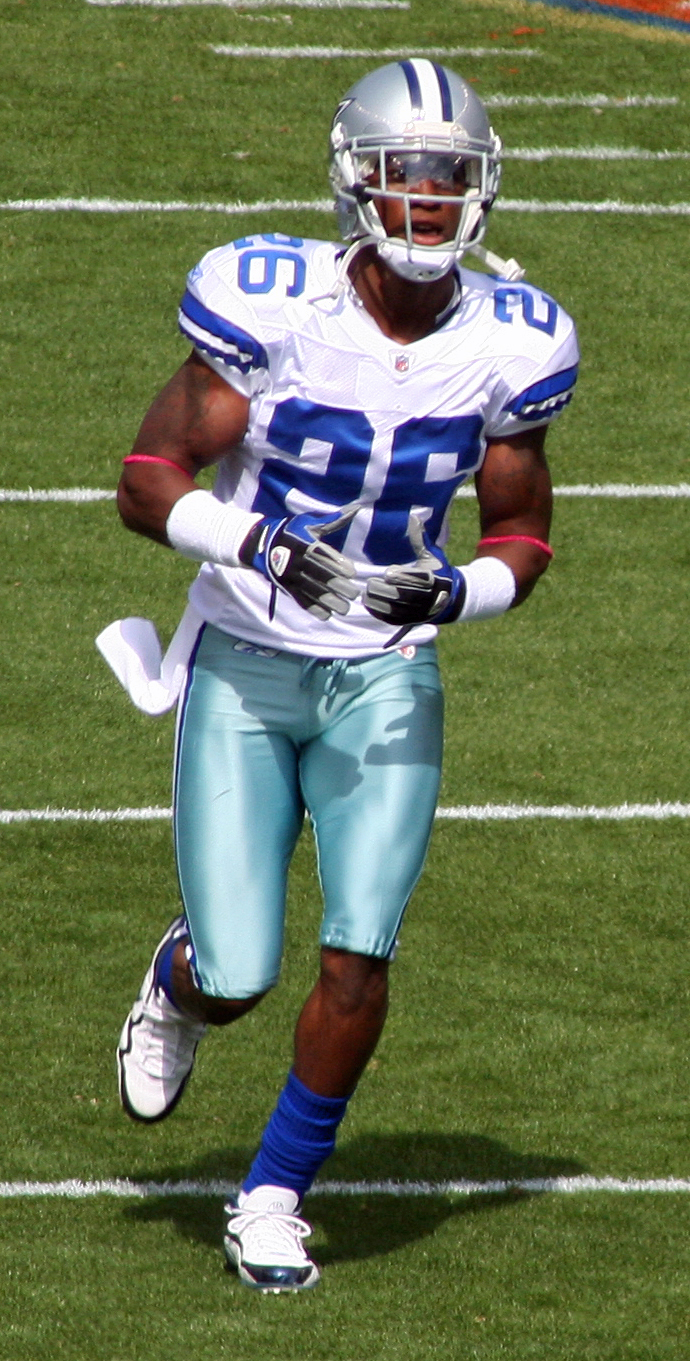
- Hamlin with the Dallas Cowboys in 2009

No. 26, 35, 22
- Position: Safety

Personal information
- Born: January 20, 1981 (age 45); Memphis, Tennessee, U.S.
- Listed height: 6 ft 2 in (1.88 m)
- Listed weight: 208 lb (94 kg)

Career information
- High school: Frayser (TN)
- College: Arkansas (2000-2002)
- NFL draft: 2003: 2nd round, 42nd overall pick

Career history
- Seattle Seahawks (2003–2006); Dallas Cowboys (2007–2009); Baltimore Ravens (2010); Indianapolis Colts (2010)

Awards and highlights
- Pro Bowl (2007); PFWA All-Rookie Team (2003); PFW All-Rookie (2003); First-team All-American (2002); First-team All-SEC (2001, 2002); Freshman All-SEC (2000)

Career NFL statistics
- Total tackles: 489
- Sacks: 5
- Forced fumbles: 5
- Fumble recoveries: 3
- Interceptions: 15
- Stats at Pro Football Reference

Ken Hamlin (born January 20, 1981) is an American former professional football player who was a safety in the National Football League (NFL). He played college football for the Arkansas Razorbacks. Hamlin was selected by the Seattle Seahawks in the second round of the 2003 NFL draft and also played for the Dallas Cowboys, Baltimore Ravens and Indianapolis Colts. He earned a Pro Bowl selection with the Cowboys in 2007. He was also the first freshman and only the second defensive back to lead the school in tackles, recording 104 (57 solo).

On October 17, 2005, he was involved in an altercation that allegedly took place between himself and two unidentified men in a Seattle nightclub. As a result of the incident, Hamlin suffered multiple injuries that ended his 2005 season after just five games. The injuries included a fractured skull, a small blood clot, and bruising of the brain tissue.

== Early life ==
Hamlin attended Frayser High School in Frayser neighborhood of Memphis where he was the Class 3A Player of the Year as a senior in 1999, when he gained 2,327 all-purpose yards and rushed for 1,276 yards and 16 touchdowns and recorded 380 receiving yards. He also recorded 136 tackles (96 solo) and eight interceptions as a safety. He also lettered in track and baseball. He was also a member of the school's National Honor Society and the senior class vice president.

== College career ==
Hamlin then attended the University of Arkansas from 2000 until 2002 where he became the first freshman and only the second defensive back to lead the school in tackles, recording 104 (57 solo). As a freshman, he was named an All-American by The Sporting News and Football News and also named to the SEC Coaches Freshman All-SEC team. As a sophomore, he was named a Second-team All-American by The NFL Draft Report and also named First-team All-SEC.

As a junior, he forced eight fumbles, recovered five, deflected 28 passes and intercepted nine. For his performance, he was named a First-team All-American by The NFL Draft Report and The Sporting News and nominated for the Jim Thorpe Award. He also became the first player in school history to record more than 100 tackles in a season three times. He was also nominated in 2002 for the Bronko Nagurski Trophy, given to the best defensive player in the nation. In his college career, Hamlin played in 36 games finishing with 381 tackles (221 solo), breaking the school record of 367 tackles by Cliff Powell (1967–69). Hamlin is a member of Omega Psi Phi fraternity. He along with former NFL Players George Wilson and Eddie Jackson were concurrent members of the same chapter of Omega Psi Phi fraternity. During his junior season, he helped Arkansas win a share of the 2002 SEC West Division Championship.

== Professional career ==
=== Pre-draft ===
Pre-draft measurables
Height	Weight	Arm length	Hand span	40-yard dash	10-yard split	20-yard split	20-yard shuttle	Three-cone drill	Vertical jump	Broad jump	Bench press
6 ft 2 1/2 in (1.89 m)	209 lb (95 kg)	31 3/4 in (0.81 m)	8 7/8 in (0.23 m)	4.61 s	1.59 s	2.71 s	3.92 s	6.80 s	33.0 in (0.84 m)	9 ft 9 in (2.97 m)	16 reps
All values from NFL Combine

=== Seattle Seahawks ===
Hamlin was selected in the second round (42nd overall) of the 2003 NFL draft by the Seattle Seahawks.

As a rookie, Hamlin started 14-of-16 games making Pro Football Weekly's All-Rookie Team. He finished second on team with 96 tackles and was third on the team with 10 passes defended. In his first career start against the New Orleans Saints on September 7, he recorded five tackles and gained national attention after knocking off Donte' Stallworth's helmet on a hit over the middle.

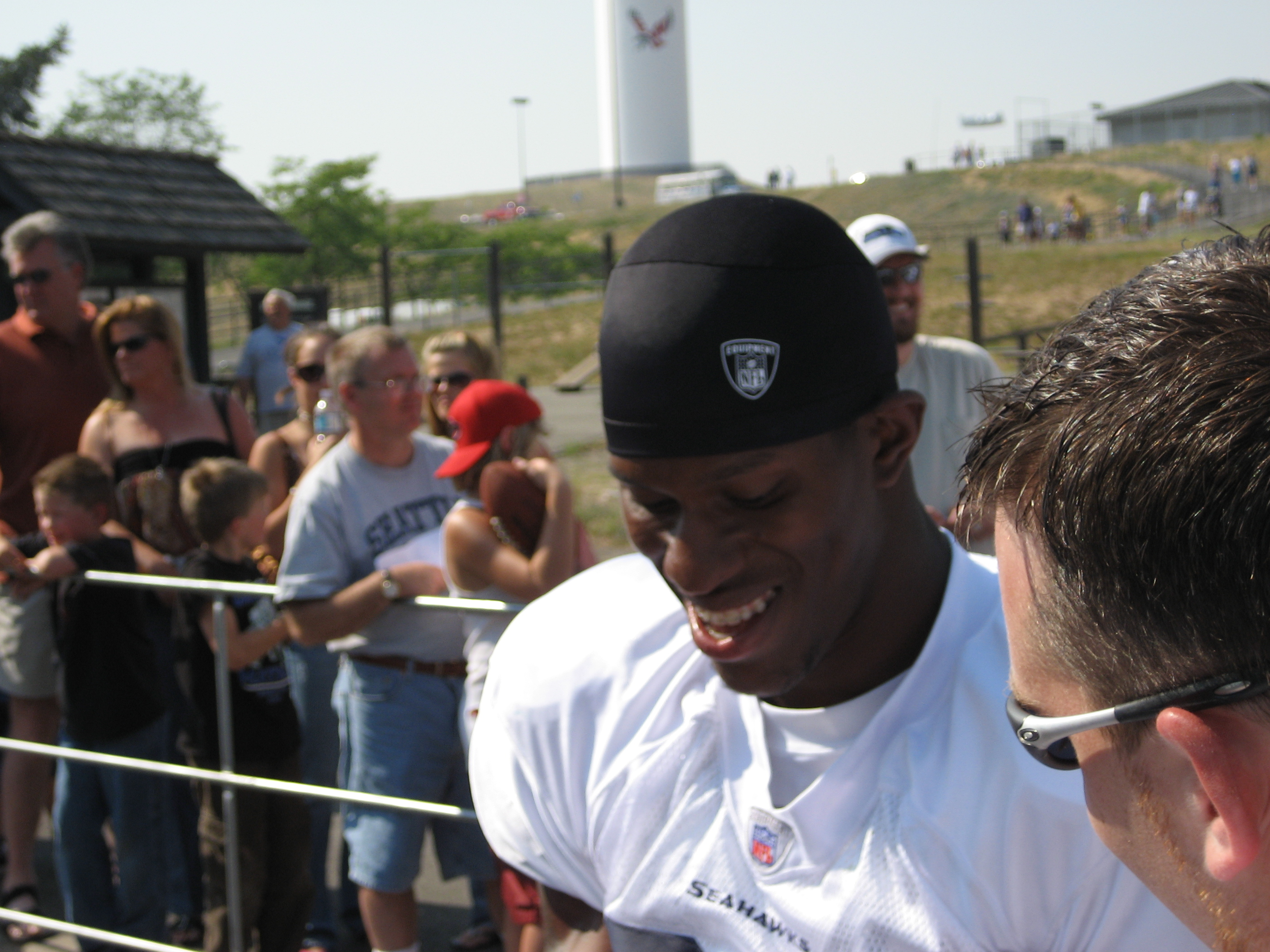
Hamlin signing an autograph while with the Seahawks in 2006.

In 2004, he started all of the team's 16 regular season games and finished third on the team with 79 tackles. He was fourth on the team with a career-high four interceptions, which ranked 10th in the NFC. In 2005, he started the first six games of the season, recording 26 tackles, before suffering off-field head injuries. He was placed on the Reserve/Non-Football Injury list on November 1 and missed the rest of the season. In 2006, Hamlin started all 16 regular-season games and finished second on the team with 96 tackles while recording three interceptions (led the team), 11 pass deflections, and one forced fumble.

==== 2005 altercation ====
Hamlin was involved in an altercation that allegedly took place between himself and two unidentified men in a Seattle nightclub on October 17, 2005. According to a police report, Hamlin and his girlfriend were leaving the club at about 2 a.m., several hours after the Seahawks defeated the Houston Texans. Hamlin's girlfriend told officers that he placed a hand on another man's shoulder and said, "Excuse me." The man told Hamlin to stop pushing, and the two men began shoving one another. According to the report, Hamlin punched the man in the face. Another man knocked Hamlin down. Other witnesses told police another man hit Hamlin twice with a street sign.

Hamlin sustained serious injuries to his head due to a blow from a street sign. He was rushed to a local hospital in critical condition with a fractured skull, a small blood clot and bruising of the brain tissue. He was released on October 20, 2005, in stable condition. He did not play football for the rest of the season.

=== Dallas Cowboys ===
In the free agency period of 2007, teams were reluctant to offer Hamlin a multi-year contract because of concerns stemming from his previous head injury. On March 23, he signed a one-year contract worth $2.5 million with the Dallas Cowboys.

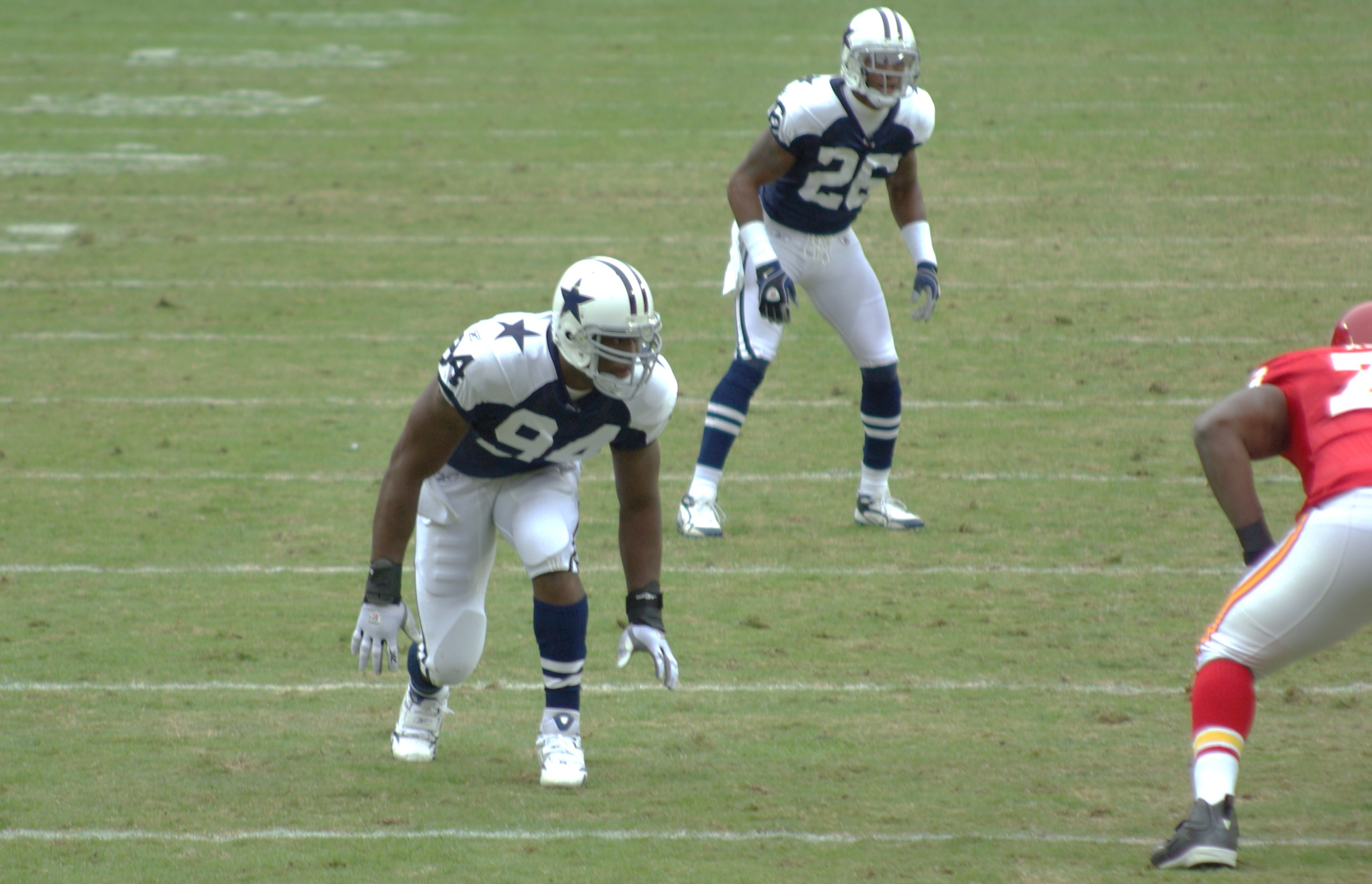
Hamlin (26) playing against the Kansas City Chiefs in 2009.

In his first season with the Cowboys, he earned his first Pro Bowl selection, being named a starter for the NFC and was one-of-13 Cowboys selected - setting a team and NFL record. He started all 16 games at free safety recording career-bests with 102 tackles (third on the team) - his first career 100-tackle season - five interceptions (second on the team and tied for ninth in the league) and 14 pass breakups. He made his Cowboys debut against the New York Giants on September 9, recording nine tackles and one pass breakup.

After the season, on February 21, 2008, the Cowboys placed a franchise tag on him, insuring he would play at least one more year with the team. On July 15, he was rewarded with a six-year, $38 million contract. In 2008, Hamlin was elected as one of the defensive team captains for the season and finished fourth on the team - first in the secondary - with 92 tackles, along with three pass breakups, one interception, a sack, a forced fumble and a fumble recovery. The next year, he registered 12 starts (missed 4 games with a high ankle injury), 74 tackles and 4 passes defensed. He was released on April 2, 2010.

=== Baltimore Ravens ===
Hamlin was signed by the Baltimore Ravens on June 17, 2010. Third on the depth chart behind Haruki Nakamura and Tom Zbikowski, he was released by the Ravens on Sept 22, 2010. Hamlin dressed for both regular season games before his release, but recorded no statistics.

On September 29, 2010, the Ravens re-signed Hamlin; taking the roster spot of defensive end Trevor Pryce, who was released and subsequently signed with the New York Jets. He intercepted Tom Brady when the Ravens played against the New England Patriots. The Ravens again released Hamlin on November 30, 2010. He played mainly on special teams and had three defensive tackles during his time with the team.

=== Indianapolis Colts ===
On December 22, 2010, Hamlin was signed by the Indianapolis Colts, filling the roster spot made available when Austin Collie was placed on injured reserve. He played in two regular season games but did not record a statistic. In the playoffs against the New York Jets he posted 3 tackles in a reserve role. He wasn't re-signed at the end of the season.

=== NFL statistics ===
Year	Team	GP	COMB	TOTAL	AST	SACK	FF	FR	FR YDS	INT	IR YDS	AVG IR	LNG	TD	PD
2003	SEA	16	96	76	20	0.0	2	1	0	1	2	2	2	0	8
2004	SEA	16	80	64	16	2.0	1	0	0	4	48	12	24	0	9
2005	SEA	6	26	22	4	0.0	0	0	0	0	0	0	0	0	2
2006	SEA	16	96	75	21	2.0	1	0	0	3	63	21	37	0	11
2007	DAL	16	62	45	17	0.0	0	0	0	5	93	19	35	0	15
2008	DAL	16	74	53	21	1.0	1	1	0	1	0	0	0	0	2
2009	DAL	12	52	40	12	0.0	0	0	0	0	0	0	0	0	2
2010	BAL	7	3	1	2	0.0	0	1	0	1	0	0	0	0	1
Career		105	489	376	113	5.0	5	3	0	15	206	14	37	0	50
