= Dowayne Davis =

American football player (born 1986)

No. 26
- Position: Safety

Personal information
- Born: March 9, 1986 (age 40); Jamaica
- Listed height: 6 ft 0 in (1.83 m)
- Listed weight: 202 lb (92 kg)

Career information
- High school: New York (NY) Christopher Columbus
- College: Syracuse
- NFL draft: 2008: undrafted

Career history
- Dallas Cowboys (2008)*; Kansas City Chiefs (2008)*; Detroit Lions (2008–2009)*
- * Offseason or practice squad member only

Dowayne D. Davis (born March 9, 1986) is a former American football safety. He was signed by the Dallas Cowboys as an undrafted free agent in 2008. He played college football at Syracuse.

Davis was also a member of the Kansas City Chiefs and Detroit Lions.

== Early life ==
Davis was born in Jamaica and moved to the United States at age 10. He began playing football while attending high school in New York City. He played high school football as a linebacker and running back at Christopher Columbus High School in The Bronx. He set the school’s record in September 2003 with 35 carries and 306 rushing yards and scored all of Columbus’ points (2 touchdowns and 2 two-point conversions) in a 16-12 win over Campus Magnet. In October 2004, he was the only Bronx athlete to play for the New York state All-Star team in the 7th annual Governor's Bowl All-Star Football game. Davis had 4 solo tackles in the game and was regarded as "the lockdown corner of the game."

== Syracuse University ==
Davis enrolled at Syracuse University in 2004. He played college football at Syracuse from 2004 to 2007. He started 35 consecutive games and totaled 216 tackles for the Orangemen to rank 10th all-time in career tackles by a defensive back at Syracuse. As a sophomore in 2005, Davis was moved to the strong safety position. Davis was a starter at the strong safety position for Syracuse in 2005 and 2006, but he was switched to the cornerback position for the 2007 season. In January 2008, Davis was honored by the Central New York Chapter of the National Football Foundation as the Scholar Athlete of the Year. He was also selected to the Big East Conference All-Academic Team.

== Professional career ==
=== Dallas Cowboys ===
Not selected in the 2008 NFL draft, Davis entered the NFL by signing with the Dallas Cowboys on May 1, 2008. He was waived by the Cowboys on August 30 during final cuts.

=== Kansas City Chiefs ===
On September 3, 2008, Davis was added to the practice squad of the Kansas City Chiefs. He was released on September 25.

=== Detroit Lions ===
Davis was signed to the practice squad of the Detroit Lions on December 16, 2008. Following the season, he was re-signed to a future contract on December 29. The Lions released Davis (by request) on April 16.
