= 2007 Dallas Cowboys season =

NFL team season

- Owner: Jerry Jones
- General manager: Jerry Jones
- Head coach: Wade Phillips
- Offensive coordinator: Jason Garrett
- Defensive coordinator: Brian Stewart
- Home stadium: Texas Stadium

Results
- Record: 13–3
- Division place: 1st NFC East
- Playoffs: Lost Divisional Playoffs (vs. Giants) 17–21
- All-Pros: 5: WR Terrell Owens (1st team); TE Jason Witten (1st team); OLB DeMarcus Ware (1st team); T Flozell Adams (2nd team); G Leonard Davis (2nd team)
- Pro Bowlers: 13: QB Tony Romo; RB Marion Barber; WR Terrell Owens; TE Jason Witten; T Flozell Adams; G Leonard Davis; C Andre Gurode; OLB DeMarcus Ware; OLB Greg Ellis; CB Terence Newman; FS Ken Hamlin; SS Roy Williams; K Nick Folk

Uniform
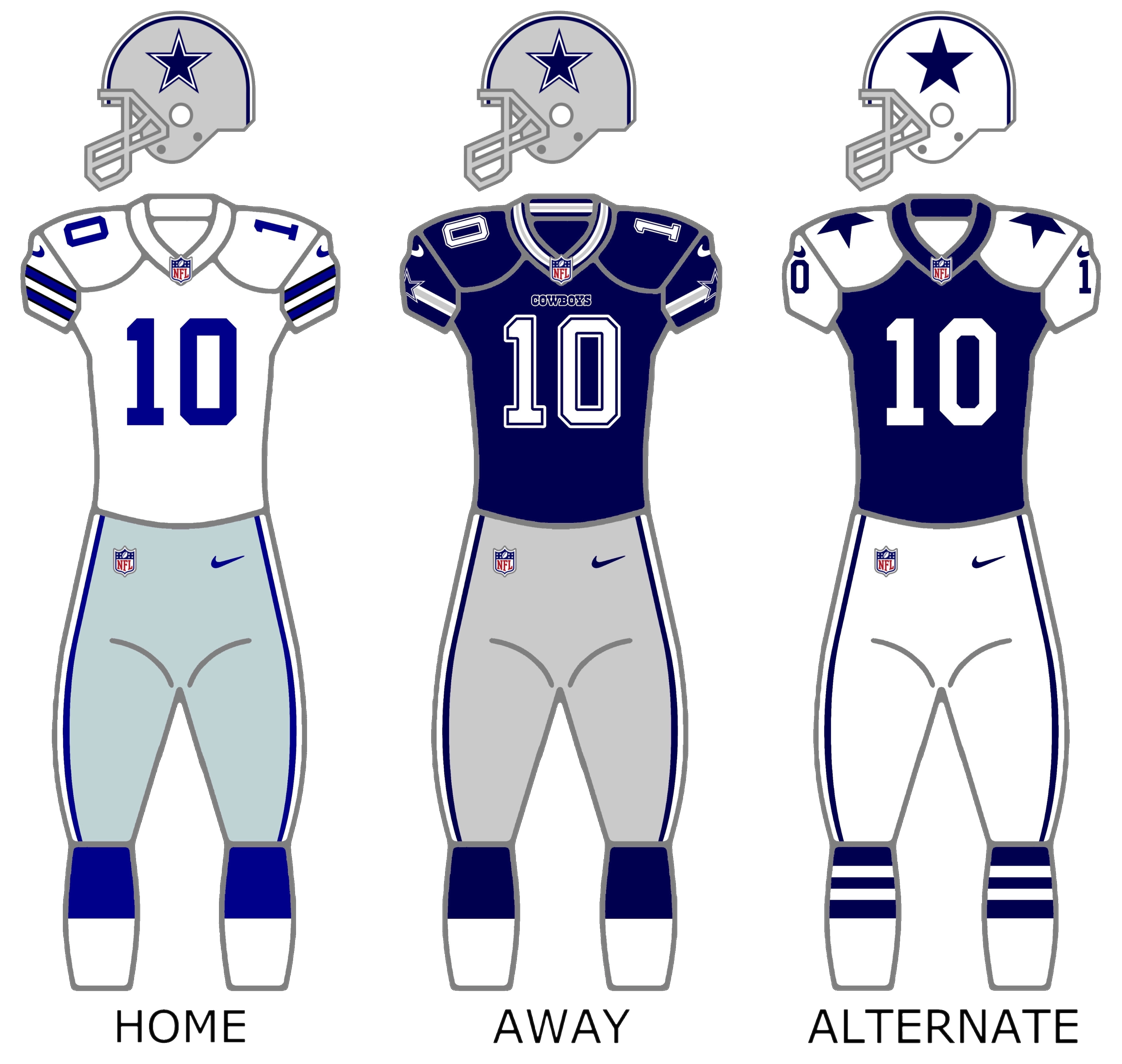

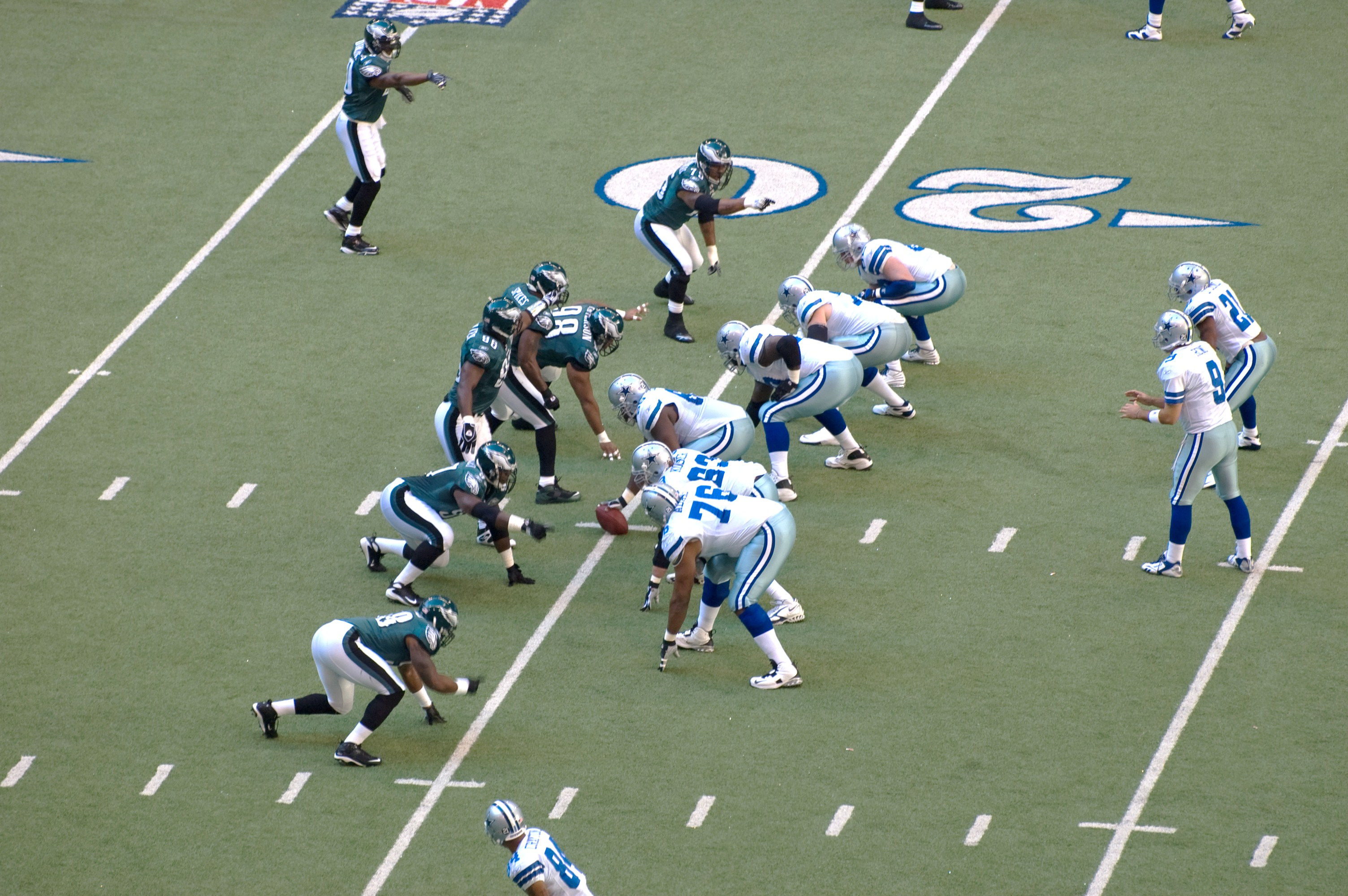
Dallas vs. Philadelphia in the 2007 season, week 15, with Tony Romo in the shotgun

The 2007 season was the Dallas Cowboys' 48th in the National Football League (NFL), their 19th under the ownership of Jerry Jones, their 37th playing their home games at Texas Stadium, their first season under offensive coordinator Jason Garrett and their first season under head coach Wade Phillips. The Cowboys won the NFC East for the first time since 1998, and finished the regular season tied for the best record in the NFC (13–3) and earned a first-round bye and home field advantage throughout the playoffs, both for the first time since 1995.

However, they were upset by division rival and eventual Super Bowl champion New York Giants 21–17, a team that they had swept in the regular season. With the loss, it extended the Cowboys’ drought of playoff wins to eleven seasons and tied the NFL record of six consecutive playoff games lost. 13 players were named to the Pro Bowl, an NFL record (since tied by the 2019 Baltimore Ravens).

== Offseason ==
=== Head coach ===
Wade Phillips entered the first year of his contract with the Cowboys. He was hired on February 8, 2007, after former head coach Bill Parcells decided to retire.

=== Signings ===
On March 5, the Cowboys signed tackle Leonard Davis, formerly with the Cardinals, to a 7-year, $50 million contract.
On March 6, the Cowboys signed quarterback Brad Johnson, formerly with the Vikings, to a 3-year, $7.5 million contract.
On March 23, the Cowboys signed safety Ken Hamlin, formerly with the Seahawks, to a 1-year, $2.5 million contract.

=== Departures ===
On March 1, the Cowboys released quarterback Drew Bledsoe, center E.J. Whitley, and tight end Ryan Hannam.
On August 26, The Cowboys released Jamel Richardson

=== Free agents heading into the 2007 season ===
(Note: RFA: Restricted free-agent, UFA: Unrestricted free-agent, ERFA: Exclusive rights free agent)

| Position | Player | Free agency tag | Date signed | 2007 team |
|---|---|---|---|---|
| DE | Stephen Bowen | ERFA | | |
| DE | Kenyon Coleman | UFA | March 6 | New York Jets |
| OT | Marc Colombo | UFA | March 9 | Dallas Cowboys |
| WR | Patrick Crayton | RFA | April 5 | Dallas Cowboys |
| S | Abram Elam | ERFA | | New York Jets |
| LB | Ryan Fowler | RFA (Note: The Cowboys tendered Fowler giving them the right to match any offer that another team may have for Fowler.) | | Tennessee Titans |
| LB | Junior Glymph | RFA (Note: The Cowboys tendered Glymph giving them the right to match any offer that another team may have for Glymph. If the Cowboys decide not to match the offer, they will receive a seventh round pick.) | | |
| K | Martín Gramática | UFA | March 5 | Dallas Cowboys |
| C | Andre Gurode | UFA | February 20 | Dallas Cowboys |
| C | Al Johnson | RFA | March 7 | Arizona Cardinals |
| CB | Nathan Jones | RFA (Note: The Cowboys tendered Jones giving them the right to match any offer that another team may have for Jones. If the Cowboys decide not to match the offer, they will receive a seventh round pick.) | | |
| LS | L.P. Ladouceur | ERFA | | |
| P | Mat McBriar | RFA | February 28 | Dallas Cowboys |
| SS | Tony Parrish | UFA | | |
| OG | Cory Procter | ERFA | | |
| DE | Jeremiah Ratliff | ERFA | | |
| CB | Jacques Reeves | RFA (Note: The Cowboys tendered Reeves giving them the right to match any offer that another team may have for Reeves. If the Cowboys decide not to match the offer, they will receive a seventh round pick.) | | |
| LB | Al Singleton | UFA | | |

== 2007 draft class ==
2007 Dallas Cowboys draft
| Round | Pick | Player | Position | College | Notes |
| 1 | 26 | Anthony Spencer * | LB | Purdue | |
| 3 | 67 | James Marten | OT | Boston College | |
| 4 | 103 | Isaiah Stanback | WR | Washington | |
| 4 | 122 | Doug Free | OT | Northern Illinois | |
| 6 | 178 | Nick Folk * | K | Arizona | |
| 6 | 195 | Deon Anderson | FB | Connecticut | |
| 7 | 212 | Courtney Brown | DB | Cal Poly | |
| 7 | 237 | Alan Ball | CB | Illinois | |
Made roster † Pro Football Hall of Fame * Made at least one Pro Bowl during career

Notes

- The Cowboys traded their first-round (No. 22 overall) selection to the Cleveland Browns for 2007 second-round (No. 36 overall) and 2008 first-round (No. 22 overall) selections.
- The Cowboys traded their second, (No. 36 overall) third (No. 87 overall) and fifth-round (No. 159 overall) selections in exchange for the Philadelphia Eagles' first-round (No. 26 overall) selection.
- The Cowboys traded their second (No. 53 overall) and sixth-round (No. 195 overall) selections to the Browns in exchange for third, (No. 67 overall) fourth (No. 103 overall) and sixth-round (No. 178 overall) selections.
- The Cowboys traded their sixth (No. 200 overall) and seventh-round (No. 234 overall) selections to the Browns in exchange for Dallas' original sixth-round (No. 195 overall) selection.
- The Cowboys traded tight end Sean Ryan to the New York Jets for a seventh-round (No. 212 overall) selection.
- The Cowboys traded linebacker Scott Shanle to the New Orleans Saints for a seventh-round (No. 237 overall) selection.

== 2007 Undrafted free agents ==
2007 undrafted free agents of note
| Player | Position | College |
|---|---|---|
| Richard Bartel | Quarterback | Tarleton State |
| Matt Moore | Quarterback | Oregon State |

== Rosters ==
=== Opening training camp roster ===
Dallas Cowboys 2007 opening training camp roster
| Quarterbacks: 16 Matt Baker; 4 Richard Bartel; 14 Brad Johnson; 5 Matt Moore; 9 Tony Romo; Running backs: 34 Deon Anderson FB; 24 Marion Barber III; 32 Jackie Battle; 30 Alonzo Coleman; 46 Oliver Hoyte FB; 21 Julius Jones; 39 Lousaka Polite FB; 28 Tyson Thompson; Wide receivers: 19 Miles Austin; 84 Patrick Crayton; 83 Terry Glenn; 17 Sam Hurd; 13 Mike Jefferson; 81 Terrell Owens; 11 Jerard Rabb; 85 Jamaica Rector; 18 Jamel Richardson; 86 Isaiah Stanback; 15 Jerheme Urban; Tight ends: 49 Adam Bergen; 89 Tony Curtis; 80 Anthony Fasano; 44 Rodney Hannah; 82 Jason Witten; 87 Andy Thorn | Offensive linemen: 76 Flozell Adams T; 67 Joe Berger G; 75 Marc Colombo T; 66 Trey Darilek C; 70 Leonard Davis G/T; 74 Steve Franklin G; 68 Doug Free T; 65 Andre Gurode C; 63 Kyle Kosier G; 79 James Marten T; 77 Pat McQuistan G/T; 71 Cory Procter G; 62 Matt Tarullo G; 52 Robert Turner T; Defensive linemen: 78 Remi Ayodele NT; 72 Stephen Bowen DE; 99 Chris Canty DE; 64 Ola Dagunduro NT; 95 Jason Ferguson NT; 97 Jason Hatcher DE; 90 Jay Ratliff DE; 60 Marcus Smith DE; 96 Marcus Spears DE; 92 Montavious Stanley NT | Linebackers: 51 Akin Ayodele ILB; 57 Kevin Burnett OLB; 54 Bobby Carpenter ILB; 98 Greg Ellis OLB/DE; 53 Junior Glymph OLB; 58 Dedrick Harrington ILB; 56 Bradie James ILB; 50 Alex Obomese OLB; 59 Blair Phillips ILB; 55 John Saldi OLB; 93 Anthony Spencer OLB; 94 DeMarcus Ware OLB/DE; Defensive backs: 38 Alan Ball CB; 20 Damarius Bilbo S; 40 Courtney Brown CB; 36 Quincy Butler CB; 29 Keith Davis SS; 37 Abram Elam SS; 26 Aaron Glenn CB; 27 Ken Hamlin FS; 42 Anthony Henry CB; 33 Nate Jones CB; 41 Terence Newman CB; 35 Jacques Reeves CB; 23 Joey Thomas CB; 25 Pat Watkins FS; 31 Roy Williams SS; Special teams: 6 Nick Folk K; 7 Martín Gramática K; 91 L. P. Ladouceur LS; 1 Mat McBriar P; 2 Sam Paulescu P | Reserve lists: Currently vacant; Rookies in italics 86 active, 0 inactive |

=== Week one roster ===
Dallas Cowboys 2007 week one roster
| Quarterbacks: 14 Brad Johnson; 9 Tony Romo; Running backs: 34 Deon Anderson FB; 24 Marion Barber III; 46 Oliver Hoyte FB; 21 Julius Jones; 28 Tyson Thompson; Wide receivers: 19 Miles Austin; 84 Patrick Crayton; 83 Terry Glenn; 17 Sam Hurd; 81 Terrell Owens; 86 Isaiah Stanback; Tight ends: 89 Tony Curtis; 80 Anthony Fasano; 82 Jason Witten | Offensive linemen: 76 Flozell Adams T; 67 Joe Berger G; 75 Marc Colombo T; 70 Leonard Davis G; 68 Doug Free T; 65 Andre Gurode C; 63 Kyle Kosier G; 78 James Marten T; 77 Pat McQuistan T; 71 Cory Procter C/G; Defensive linemen: 72 Stephen Bowen DE; 99 Chris Canty DE; 95 Jason Ferguson NT; 97 Jason Hatcher DE; 90 Jay Ratliff NT/DE; 96 Marcus Spears DE | Linebackers: 51 Akin Ayodele ILB; 57 Kevin Burnett ILB; 54 Bobby Carpenter ILB; 98 Greg Ellis OLB/DE; 56 Bradie James ILB; 50 Justin Rogers OLB; 93 Anthony Spencer OLB; 94 DeMarcus Ware OLB/DE; Defensive backs: 27 Courtney Brown CB; 29 Keith Davis SS; 26 Ken Hamlin FS; 42 Anthony Henry CB; 33 Nathan Jones CB; 41 Terence Newman CB; 23 Evan Oglesby CB; 35 Jacques Reeves CB; 25 Pat Watkins FS; 31 Roy Williams SS; Special teams: 6 Nick Folk K; 91 L. P. Ladouceur LS; 1 Mat McBriar P | Reserve lists: 7 Martín Gramática K (IR); Practice Squad: 20 Alan Ball CB; 4 Richard Bartel QB; 36 Quincy Butler CB; 30 Alonzo Coleman RB; 44 Rodney Hannah TE; 85 Mike Jefferson WR; 52 Khari Long OLB; 60 Marcus Smith DE; Rookies in italics 53 active, 1 inactive, 8 PS |

=== Final roster ===
Dallas Cowboys 2007 final roster
| Quarterbacks: 14 Brad Johnson; 9 Tony Romo; Running backs: 24 Marion Barber; 46 Oliver Hoyte FB; 21 Julius Jones; 28 Tyson Thompson KR; Wide receivers: 19 Miles Austin KR; 84 Patrick Crayton PR; 83 Terry Glenn; 17 Sam Hurd; 81 Terrell Owens; 86 Isaiah Stanback KR; Tight ends: 89 Tony Curtis; 80 Anthony Fasano; 82 Jason Witten | Offensive linemen: 76 Flozell Adams T; 67 Joe Berger G; 75 Marc Colombo T; 70 Leonard Davis G; 68 Doug Free T; 65 Andre Gurode C; 63 Kyle Kosier G; 78 James Marten T; 77 Pat McQuistan T; 71 Cory Procter C/G; Defensive linemen: 72 Stephen Bowen DE; 99 Chris Canty DE; 97 Jason Hatcher DE; 66 Tank Johnson NT; 90 Jay Ratliff NT; 96 Marcus Spears DE | Linebackers: 51 Akin Ayodele ILB; 57 Kevin Burnett ILB; 54 Bobby Carpenter ILB; 98 Greg Ellis OLB; 56 Bradie James ILB; 50 Justin Rogers OLB; 93 Anthony Spencer OLB; 94 DeMarcus Ware OLB; Defensive backs: 20 Alan Ball CB/S; 27 Courtney Brown SS; 29 Keith Davis SS; 26 Ken Hamlin FS; 42 Anthony Henry CB; 33 Nate Jones CB/KR; 41 Terence Newman CB/PR; 23 Evan Oglesby CB; 35 Jacques Reeves CB; 25 Pat Watkins FS; 31 Roy Williams SS; Special teams: 6 Nick Folk K; 91 L. P. Ladouceur LS; 1 Mat McBriar P | Reserve lists: 34 Deon Anderson FB (IR); 95 Jason Ferguson NT (IR); Practice Squad: 92 Remi Ayodele NT; 4 Richard Bartel QB; 36 Quincy Butler CB; 30 Alonzo Coleman RB; 44 Rodney Hannah TE; 85 Mike Jefferson WR; 60 Marcus Smith DE; 58 Tyson Smith LB; Rookies in italics 53 active, 2 inactive, 8 practice squad |

== Schedule ==
=== Preseason ===
| Week | Date | Opponent | Result | Record | Game site | NFL.com recap |
|---|---|---|---|---|---|---|
| 1 | August 9 | Indianapolis Colts | W 23–10 | 1–0 | Texas Stadium | Recap |
| 2 | August 18 | Denver Broncos | W 31–20 | 2–0 | Texas Stadium | Recap |
| 3 | August 25 | at Houston Texans | L 16–28 | 2–1 | Reliant Stadium | Recap |
| 4 | August 30 | at Minnesota Vikings | L 14–23 | 2–2 | Hubert H. Humphrey Metrodome | Recap |

=== Regular season ===
| Week | Date | Opponent | Result | Record | Game site | NFL.com recap |
|---|---|---|---|---|---|---|
| 1 | September 9 | New York Giants | W 45–35 | 1–0 | Texas Stadium | Recap |
| 2 | September 16 | at Miami Dolphins | W 37–20 | 2–0 | Dolphin Stadium | Recap |
| 3 | September 23 | at Chicago Bears | W 34–10 | 3–0 | Soldier Field | Recap |
| 4 | September 30 | St. Louis Rams | W 35–7 | 4–0 | Texas Stadium | Recap |
| 5 | October 8 | at Buffalo Bills | W 25–24 | 5–0 | Ralph Wilson Stadium | Recap |
| 6 | October 14 | New England Patriots | L 27–48 | 5–1 | Texas Stadium | Recap |
| 7 | October 21 | Minnesota Vikings | W 24–14 | 6–1 | Texas Stadium | Recap |
| 8 | Bye | | | | | |
| 9 | November 4 | at Philadelphia Eagles | W 38–17 | 7–1 | Lincoln Financial Field | Recap |
| 10 | November 11 | at New York Giants | W 31–20 | 8–1 | Giants Stadium | Recap |
| 11 | November 18 | Washington Redskins | W 28–23 | 9–1 | Texas Stadium | Recap |
| 12 | November 22 | New York Jets | W 34–3 | 10–1 | Texas Stadium | Recap |
| 13 | November 29 | Green Bay Packers | W 37–27 | 11–1 | Texas Stadium | Recap |
| 14 | December 9 | at Detroit Lions | W 28–27 | 12–1 | Ford Field | Recap |
| 15 | December 16 | Philadelphia Eagles | L 6–10 | 12–2 | Texas Stadium | Recap |
| 16 | December 22 | at Carolina Panthers | W 20–13 | 13–2 | Bank of America Stadium | Recap |
| 17 | December 30 | at Washington Redskins | L 6–27 | 13–3 | FedExField | Recap |

== Standings ==
NFC East
| | W | L | T | PCT | DIV | CONF | PF | PA | STK |
|---|---|---|---|---|---|---|---|---|---|
| ^{(1)} Dallas Cowboys | 13 | 3 | 0 | .813 | 4–2 | 10–2 | 455 | 325 | L1 |
| ^{(5)} New York Giants | 10 | 6 | 0 | .625 | 3–3 | 7–5 | 373 | 351 | L1 |
| ^{(6)} Washington Redskins | 9 | 7 | 0 | .563 | 3–3 | 7–5 | 334 | 310 | W4 |
| Philadelphia Eagles | 8 | 8 | 0 | .500 | 2–4 | 5–7 | 336 | 300 | W3 |

== Regular season ==
=== Week 1: vs. New York Giants ===
| Quarter | 1 | 2 | 3 | 4 | Total |
|---|---|---|---|---|---|
| Giants | 6 | 10 | 3 | 16 | 35 |
| Cowboys | 3 | 14 | 14 | 14 | 45 |

at Texas Stadium, Irving, Texas

- Game time: 8:15 pm EDT
- Game weather: 78 °F or 25.6 °C (Cloudy)
- Game attendance: 63,031
- Referee: Ed Hochuli
- TV announcers (NBC): Al Michaels (play-by-play), John Madden (color commentator), & Andrea Kremer (sideline reporter)

The Cowboys began their 2007 campaign at home against their NFC East rival New York Giants. In the first quarter, Dallas trailed early as QB Eli Manning completed a 60-yard TD pass to WR Plaxico Burress to give New York an early 6–0 lead (botched hold on PAT). Afterwards, the Cowboys got on the board with rookie kicker Nick Folk getting a 31-yard field goal. In the second quarter, Dallas took the lead with RB Marion Barber getting an 18-yard TD run, while QB Tony Romo completed an 18-yard TD pass to TE Jason Witten. Afterwards, the Giants would end up trailing by one at halftime, as Manning & Burress hooked up with each other again on a 4-yard TD pass, while kicker Lawrence Tynes got a 44-yard field goal.

In the third quarter, Dallas responded with Romo completing a 22-yard TD pass to WR Terrell Owens. New York would climb back with Tynes kicking a 48-yard field goal, but the Cowboys answered with Romo running into the end zone from 9 yards out. In the fourth quarter, the Giants managed to try to come back with Tynes' 24-yard field goal, yet Dallas would reply with Romo & Owens hooking up with each other again on a 47-yard TD pass. Just when it looked like New York was drawing closer with Manning's 9-yard TD pass to RB Derrick Ward (with a failed 2-point conversion) and his 10-yard TD pass to Burress, the Cowboys sealed the win with Romo completing a 51-yard TD pass to WR Sam Hurd.

With the win, Dallas began its season at 1–0.

==== Scoring summary ====
- Q1 – NYG – 13:42 –60-yard TD pass from Eli Manning to Plaxico Burress (PAT failed) (NYG 6–0)
- Q1 – DAL – 6:36 – Nick Folk 31-yard FG (NYG 6–3)
- Q2 – DAL – 9:49 – Marion Barber 18-yard TD run (Folk kick) (DAL 10–6)
- Q2 – DAL – 4:01 – 18-yard TD pass from Tony Romo to Jason Witten (Folk kick) (DAL 17–6)
- Q2 – NYG – 0:25 – 4-yard TD pass from Eli Manning to Plaxico Burress (Lawrence Tynes kick) (DAL 17–13)
- Q2 – NYG – 0:07 – Lawrence Tynes 44-yard FG (DAL 17–16)
- Q3 – DAL – 12:07 – 22-yard TD pass from Tony Romo to Terrell Owens (Folk kick) (DAL 24–16)
- Q3 – NYG – 5:51 – Lawrence Tynes 48-yard FG (DAL 24–19)
- Q3 – DAL – 1:18 – Tony Romo 9-yard TD run (Folk kick) (DAL 31–19)
- Q4 – NYG – 13:33 – Lawrence Tynes 24-yard FG (DAL 31–22)
- Q4 – DAL – 11:52 – 47-yard TD pass from Tony Romo to Terrell Owens (Folk kick) (DAL 38–22)
- Q4 – NYG – 7:26 – 9-yard TD pass from Eli Manning to Derrick Ward (Conversion failed) (DAL 38–28)
- Q4 – NYG – 4:15 – 10-yard TD pass from Eli Manning to Plaxico Burress (Tynes kick) (DAL 38–35)
- Q4 – DAL – 3:11 – 51-yard TD pass from Tony Romo to Sam Hurd (Folk kick) (DAL 45–35)

=== Week 2: at Miami Dolphins ===
| Quarter | 1 | 2 | 3 | 4 | Total |
|---|---|---|---|---|---|
| Cowboys | 3 | 7 | 10 | 17 | 37 |
| Dolphins | 3 | 3 | 7 | 7 | 20 |

at Dolphin Stadium, Miami Gardens, Florida

- Game time: 4:05 p.m. EST
- Game weather: 89 °F or 31.7 °C (Mostly Cloudy)
- Game attendance: 71,615
- Referee: Terry McAulay
- TV announcers (Fox): Kenny Albert (play-by-play), Daryl Johnston (color commentator), & Tony Siragusa (sideline reporter)

Coming off their divisional home win over the Giants, the Cowboys flew to Dolphin Stadium for a Week 2 interconference fight with the Miami Dolphins. In the first quarter, Dallas trailed early with Dolphins kicker Jay Feely getting a 37-yard field goal. The Cowboys would tie the game with rookie kicker Nick Folk getting a 26-yard field goal. In the second quarter, Dallas took the lead with RB Marion Barber getting a 1-yard TD run. Miami would close out the first half with Feely getting a 45-yard field goal.

In the third quarter, the Cowboys trailed as Dolphins QB Trent Green completed an 18-yard TD pass to WR Marty Booker. Dallas jumped back into the lead with QB Tony Romo completing a 2-yard TD pass to TE Tony Curtis, along with Folk's 28-yard field goal. In the fourth quarter, the Cowboys took control with Folk's 47-yard field goal and Romo's 34-yard TD pass to WR Terrell Owens. Miami's Green completed a 21-yard TD pass to WR Derek Hagan, but Dallas responded with Barber's 40-yard TD run.

On defense, they managed to force 5 turnovers, 4 of which came from intercepting Trent Green passes.

With the win, the Cowboys improved to 2–0.

==== Scoring summary ====
- Q1 – MIA – 7:03 – Jay Feely 37-yard FG (MIA 3–0)
- Q1 – DAL – 0:03 – Nick Folk 26-yard FG (3–3)
- Q2 – DAL – 1:54 – Marion Barber 1-yard TD run (Folk kick) (DAL 10–3)
- Q2 – MIA – 0:05 – Jay Feely 45-yard FG (DAL 10–6)
- Q3 – MIA – 9:41 – 18-yard TD pass from Trent Green to Marty Booker (Feely kick) (MIA 13–10)
- Q3 – DAL – 4:41 – 2-yard TD pass from Tony Romo to Tony Curtis (Folk kick) (DAL 17–13)
- Q3 – DAL – 2:10 – Nick Folk 28-yard FG (DAL 20–13)
- Q4 – DAL – 11:00 – Nick Folk 47-yard FG (DAL 23–13)
- Q4 – DAL – 4:01 – 34-yard TD pass from Tony Romo to Terrell Owens (Folk kick) (DAL 30–13)
- Q4 – MIA – 3:26 – 21-yard TD pass from Trent Green to Derek Hagan (Feely kick) (DAL 30–20)
- Q4 – DAL – 3:17 – Marion Barber 40-yard TD run (Folk kick) (DAL 37–20)

=== Week 3: at Chicago Bears ===
| Quarter | 1 | 2 | 3 | 4 | Total |
|---|---|---|---|---|---|
| Cowboys | 0 | 3 | 14 | 17 | 34 |
| Bears | 3 | 0 | 7 | 0 | 10 |

at Soldier Field, Chicago, Illinois

- Game time: 8:15 pm EDT/7:15 pm CDT
- Game weather: 79 °F or 26.1 °C Clear
- Game attendance: 62,099
- Referee: Ron Winter
- TV announcers (NBC): Al Michaels (play-by-play), John Madden (color commentator), & Andrea Kremer (sideline reporter)

Following their road win over the Dolphins, the Cowboys traveled to Soldier Field to play a Sunday night match with the defending NFC Champion Bears. The game was close early as the Bears' Robbie Gould and the Cowboys' Nick Folk each hit field goals respectively to make it a 3–3 tie at halftime. The Cowboys took the opening drive of the third quarter and ended it with a Tony Romo to Jason Witten touchdown pass. The Bears responded on the ensuing drive with a Cedric Benson goal line plunge. The Cowboys struck again before the end of the third quarter, Romo connecting on his second touchdown pass, this time to running back Marion Barber. Folk converted a 44-yard field goal early in the fourth quarter, and on the next play from scrimmage, Bears quarterback Rex Grossman threw an interception to Cowboys cornerback Anthony Henry, who ran it back for the score. The Cowboys proceeded to kill the clock, with Barber, who capped the scoring with a one-yard touchdown run. Barber ended the night with over 100 yards rushing, and Cowboys wide receiver Terrell Owens caught eight passes for 145 yards. The Cowboys improved to 3–0, while the Bears dropped to 1–2.

==== Scoring summary ====
- Q1 – CHI – 3:09 – Robbie Gould 20-yard FG (CHI 3–0)
- Q2 – DAL – 8:49 – Nick Folk 30-yard FG (3–3)
- Q3 – DAL – 10:14 – 3-yard TD pass from Tony Romo to Jason Witten (Folk kick) (DAL 10–3)
- Q3 – CHI – 7:14 – Cedric Benson 1-yard TD run (Gould kick) (10–10)
- Q3 – DAL – 1:18 – 10-yard TD pass from Tony Romo to Marion Barber (Folk kick) (DAL 17–10)
- Q4 – DAL – 12:10 – Nick Folk 44-yard FG (DAL 20–10)
- Q4 – DAL – 11:49 – Anthony Henry 28-yard interception return TD (Folk kick) (DAL 27–10)
- Q4 – DAL – 3:10 – Marion Barber 1-yard TD run (Folk kick) (DAL 34–10)

=== Week 4: vs. St. Louis Rams ===
| Quarter | 1 | 2 | 3 | 4 | Total |
|---|---|---|---|---|---|
| Rams | 0 | 7 | 0 | 0 | 7 |
| Cowboys | 0 | 14 | 21 | 0 | 35 |

at Texas Stadium, Irving, Texas

- Game time: 1:00 pm EDT
- Game weather: 90 °F or 32.2 °C (Partly Cloudy)
- Game attendance: 62,866
- Referee: Walt Anderson
- TV announcers (Fox): Joe Buck (play-by-play), Troy Aikman (color commentator), & Pam Oliver (sideline reporter)

The Dallas Cowboys returned home to Texas Stadium to take on the 0–3 St. Louis Rams. Both teams remained scoreless in the 1st quarter. Also, starting cornerback Anthony Henry left with a sprained right ankle late in the first quarter. He'd return to the sidelines later in the game after x-rays were negative, but would not return to game.

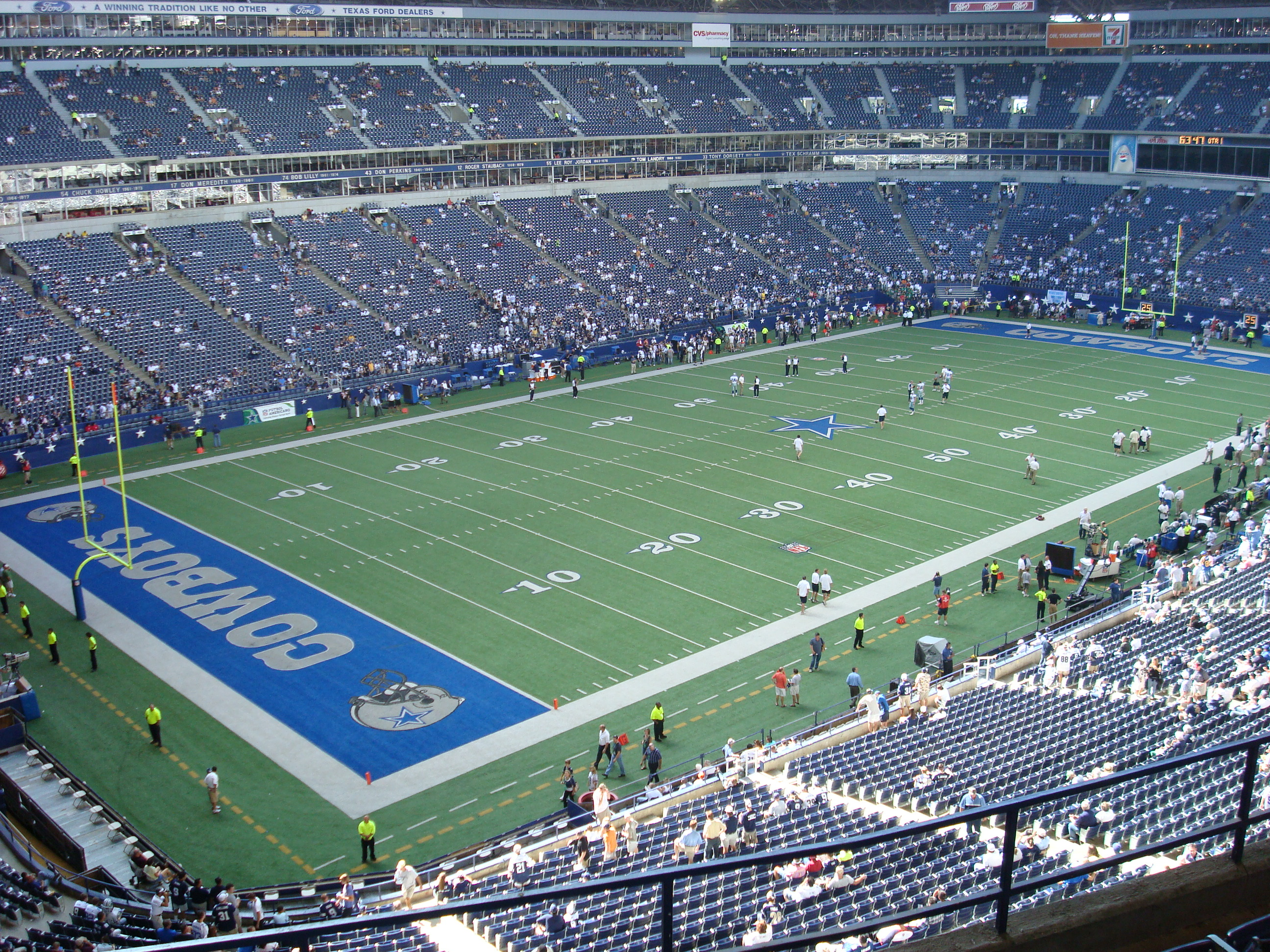
Texas Stadium pictured before the St. Louis game, September 30, 2007

Early in the 2nd quarter, the Rams' Jeff Wilkins attempted a 28-yard field goal and missed. On the next possession, the Cowboys would cap an 80-yard drive down the field with a hand-off to Julius Jones for 2 yards and the first touchdown of the game. On the next Dallas possession, the Cowboys would punt after failing to convert on a 3rd down. Mat McBriar punt went 56 yards to the St. Louis 15 and Dante Hall returned it 86 yards for a Rams TD, tying the game.

Late in the 2nd quarter, Tony Romo turned a bad snap from center Andre Gurode, 33-yards behind the line of scrimmage, into a 4-yard gain for a 3rd-down conversion. It kept the drive alive and enabled the Cowboys to regain the lead with 11 seconds left before halftime when Romo again ran with the ball for 15 yards and the second Cowboy touchdown of the game.

In the second half, the Cowboys scored three more times as Romo connected twice with Patrick Crayton for 59- and 37-yard TDs, and with Jason Witten for a 17-yard TD. The Rams would get another chance to score, but QB Marc Bulger (playing with two broken ribs) would throw an interception in the end zone to Dallas' Ken Hamlin. Gus Frerotte would come in for Bulger in the 3rd quarter.

The 35–7 victory marked the Cowboys' first 4–0 start since 1995, and left the Rams 0–4.

==== Scoring summary ====
- Q2 – DAL – 7:15 – Julius Jones 2-yard TD run (Nick Folk kick)(DAL 7–0)
- Q2 – STL – 2:11 – Dante Hall punt return 85 yards TD (Jeff Wilkins kick) (7–7)
- Q2 – DAL – 00:11 – Tony Romo 15-yard TD run (Folk kick) (DAL 14–7)
- Q3 – DAL – 12:41 – Romo to Patrick Crayton 59-yard pass TD (Folk kick) (DAL 21–7)
- Q3 – DAL – 9:40 – Romo to Crayton 37-yard pass TD (Folk kick) (DAL 28–7)
- Q3 – DAL – 2:22 – Romo to Jason Witten 17-yard pass TD (Folk kick) (DAL 35–7)

=== Week 5: at Buffalo Bills ===
| Quarter | 1 | 2 | 3 | 4 | Total |
|---|---|---|---|---|---|
| Cowboys | 0 | 10 | 3 | 12 | 25 |
| Bills | 7 | 10 | 7 | 0 | 24 |

at Ralph Wilson Stadium, Orchard Park, New York

- Game time: 8:30 pm EDT
- Game weather: 70 °F or 21.1 °C (Partly Cloudy)
- Game attendance: 71,575
- Referee: Pete Morelli
- TV announcers (ESPN): Mike Tirico (play-by-play) & Tony Kornheiser, Ron Jaworski (color commentators)

After the Bills offense failed to score on the opening drive, a Brian Moorman punt pinned the Dallas Cowboys at the 2-yard line. Tony Romo's first pass attempt of the night was intercepted by George Wilson, who ran it back 25 yards for a Bills TD. On the ensuing possession, Romo threw his second interception to Angelo Crowell. However, Buffalo was unable to capitalize on the turnover. In the second quarter, Romo completed a 23-yard touchdown pass to TE Jason Witten, tying the game at 7. But Buffalo's Rian Lindell kicked a field goal soon after to retake the lead at 10–7. On the next drive, Romo was again pinned inside the Dallas 5-yard line when Bills' defensive lineman Chris Kelsay blocked a pass and caught his own deflection in the end zone. The TD extended the Bills' lead 17–7. The Bills kicked off. Dallas began to drive until yet another Romo pass was intercepted, this time by Jabari Greer. It marked Romo's fourth interception of the night and, after a missed 54-yard field goal attempt, the second time the Bills offense would fail to score after a turnover. On the final Dallas drive of the half, Romo completed a 29-yard pass with 3 seconds left to set up a 47-yard field goal by Nick Folk. Halftime: Buffalo 17, Dallas 10.

Down by one touchdown, Dallas' first drive of the second half resulted in a second Folk field goal of 29 yards. But on the ensuing kickoff, Buffalo's T. McGee returned the ball 103 yards for a TD, giving the Bills an 11-point lead (24–13). Early in the fourth quarter, Folk added 3 more points to Dallas' score. The following drives were marred by turnovers with Romo fumbling the ball, which Buffalo recovered. The Bills drove down field until Dallas' Terrence Newman intercepted an Edwards' pass, the first of the game for the rookie Bills QB. Then, with Dallas in scoring range, Romo was picked off for the franchise record-tying 5th time. So neither team was able to score as a result of the turnovers.

Then, with 3:45 left in the fourth quarter, Dallas' offense drove 80 yards for a touchdown on a pass from Romo to Patrick Crayton. A two-point conversion to tie the game failed. With 20 seconds remaining, Folk executed an on-side kick, which was recovered by Tony Curtis for Dallas. With no timeouts and 18 seconds remaining, Romo passed twice toward the sidelines for 4-yard and 8-yard gains – enough to set up a long field goal attempt to win the game. Folk kicked. It was good, but the Bills had called a timeout. Dallas again set up to kick, and again the rookie kicker split the uprights for a career-high, 53-yard field goal and his first game-winning field goal in the NFL. The 12 unanswered points in the 4th helped Dallas improve to 5–0 and dropped the Bills to 1–4.

The Cowboys improved to 5–0, along with becoming the very first team to win a game with a −5 turnover margin.

==== Scoring summary ====
- Q1 – BUF TD – George Wilson, 25 yd interception return (Rian Lindell kick is good), 9:20. (BUF 7–0)
- Q2 – DAL TD – Jason Witten, 22 yd pass from Tony Romo (Nick Folk kick is good), 12:09. Drive: 8 plays, 70 yards in 4:00 (7–7 tie game)
- Q2 – BUF FG – Lindell, 24 yd field goal, 3:26. Drive: 15 plays, 73 yards in 8:43 (BUF 10–7)
- Q2 – BUF TD – Chris Kelsay, 0 yd interception return (Lindell kick is good), 3:15. (BUF 17–7)
- Q2 – DAL FG – Folk, 47 yd field goal, 0:00. Drive: 5 plays, 27 yards in 0:36 (BUF 17–10)
- Q3 – DAL FG – Folk, 29 yd field goal, 9:02. Drive: 14 plays, 72 yards in 5:58 (BUF 17–13)
- Q3 – BUF TD – Terrence McGee, 103 yd kick return (Lindell kick is good), 8:48. (BUF 24–13)
- Q4 – DAL FG – Folk, 37 yd field goal, 14:47. Drive: 11 plays, 73 yards in 3:46 (BUF 24–16)
- Q4 – DAL TD – Patrick Crayton, 4 yd pass from Romo (2-pt Conv. pass failed), 0:20. Drive: 12 plays, 80 yards in 3:25 (BUF 24–22)
- Q4 – DAL FG – Folk, 53 yd field goal, 0:00. Drive: 4 plays, 12 yards in 0:20 (DAL 25–24)

=== Week 6 vs. New England Patriots ===
Week Six: New England Patriots (5–0) at Dallas Cowboys (5–0)

| Quarter | 1 | 2 | 3 | 4 | Total |
|---|---|---|---|---|---|
| Patriots | 14 | 7 | 10 | 17 | 48 |
| Cowboys | 0 | 17 | 7 | 3 | 27 |

at Texas Stadium • Irving, Texas

- Date: October 14
- Game time: 3:15 pm. CDT
- Game weather: Indoors (partial dome) • 85 °F (29 °C) • Wind none
- Game attendance: 63,984
- Referee: Mike Carey
- TV announcers (CBS): Jim Nantz and Phil Simms
- Gamebook

Game information

Patriots

- Tom Brady
  31/46, 388 Yds, 5 TD
- Kevin Faulk
  12 Rush, 47 Yds
- Donté Stallworth
  7 Rec, 136 Yds, TD

Cowboys

- Tony Romo
  18/29, 199 Yds, 2 TD, INT
- Julius Jones
  6 Rush, 51 Yds
- Terrell Owens
  6 Rec, 66 Yds, TD

Coming off a last-second road win over the Bills, the Cowboys came home and played the undefeated New England Patriots, with both teams putting their perfect seasons on the line.

In the first quarter, Dallas trailed early as QB Tom Brady completed a 6-yard TD pass to WR Randy Moss, along with a 35-yard TD pass to WR Wes Welker. In the second quarter, the Cowboys got on the board with rookie kicker Nick Folk getting a 38-yard field goal, along with DE Jason Hatcher returning a fumble 29 yards for a touchdown. New England would respond with Brady and Welker hooking up with each other again on a 12-yard TD pass. Dallas would end the half with QB Tony Romo completing a 12-yard TD pass to WR Terrell Owens.

In the third quarter, the Cowboys took the lead with Romo completing an 8-yard TD pass to WR Patrick Crayton. The Patriots regained the lead with Tom Brady completing a 1-yard TD pass to TE Kyle Brady, along with kicker Stephen Gostkowski getting a 45-yard field goal. In the fourth quarter, Brady completing a 69-yard TD pass to WR Donté Stallworth. Dallas' Folk kicked a 23-yard field goal, and the Patriots' Gostkowski made a 22-yard field goal, along with RB Kyle Eckel getting a 1-yard TD run.

With the loss, the Cowboys fell to 5–1. At the time, this game was the most-watched NFL regular season game in history.

Scoring summary

| Quarter | Time | Drive | | | Team | Scoring information | Score | |
| Quarter | Time | Plays | Yards | TOP | Team | Scoring information | NE | DAL |
|---|---|---|---|---|---|---|---|---|
| 1 | 7:48 | 14 | 74 | 5:29 | Patriots | Randy Moss 6-yard touchdown reception from Tom Brady, Stephen Gostkowski kick good | 7 | 0 |
| 1 | 2:14 | 6 | 69 | 2:11 | Patriots | Wes Welker 35-yard touchdown reception from Tom Brady, Stephen Gostkowski kick good | 14 | 0 |
| 2 | 12:31 | 10 | 64 | 4:43 | Cowboys | 38-yard field goal by Nick Folk | 14 | 3 |
| 2 | 10:25 | | | | Cowboys | Fumble recovery returned 29 yards for touchdown by Jason Hatcher, Nick Folk kick good | 14 | 10 |
| 2 | 3:34 | 12 | 72 | 6:51 | Patriots | Wes Welker 12-yard touchdown reception from Tom Brady, Stephen Gostkowski kick good | 21 | 10 |
| 2 | 0:46 | 8 | 84 | 2:48 | Cowboys | Terrell Owens 12-yard touchdown reception from Tony Romo, Nick Folk kick good | 21 | 17 |
| 3 | 10:20 | 7 | 74 | 3:36 | Cowboys | Patrick Crayton 8-yard touchdown reception from Tony Romo, Nick Folk kick good | 21 | 24 |
| 3 | 4:56 | 10 | 77 | 5:24 | Patriots | Kyle Brady 1-yard touchdown reception from Tom Brady, Stephen Gostkowski kick good | 28 | 24 |
| 3 | 2:14 | 4 | 16 | 1:32 | Patriots | 45-yard field goal by Stephen Gostkowski | 31 | 24 |
| 4 | 12:21 | 4 | 80 | 2:13 | Patriots | Donté Stallworth 69-yard touchdown reception from Tom Brady, Stephen Gostkowski kick good | 38 | 24 |
| 4 | 10:03 | 5 | 18 | 2:18 | Cowboys | 23-yard field goal by Nick Folk | 38 | 27 |
| 4 | 3:59 | 12 | 61 | 6:04 | Patriots | 22-yard field goal by Stephen Gostkowski | 41 | 27 |
| 4 | 0:19 | 7 | 20 | 3:26 | Patriots | Kyle Eckel 1-yard touchdown run, Stephen Gostkowski kick good | 48 | 27 |
| "TOP" = time of possession. For other American football terms, see Glossary of American football. | | | | | | | 48 | 27 |

=== Week 7: vs. Minnesota Vikings ===
| Quarter | 1 | 2 | 3 | 4 | Total |
|---|---|---|---|---|---|
| Vikings | 7 | 7 | 0 | 0 | 14 |
| Cowboys | 7 | 0 | 14 | 3 | 24 |

at Texas Stadium, Irving, Texas

- Game time: 4:15 pm EDT
- Game weather: 88 °F or 31.1 °C
- Game attendance: 63,432
- Referee: Walt Coleman
- TV announcers (Fox): Kenny Albert (play-by-play), Troy Aikman (color commentator), & Pam Oliver (sideline reporter)

Hoping to rebound from their home loss to the Patriots, the Cowboys stayed at home for a Week 7 intraconference game against the Minnesota Vikings. In the first quarter, Dallas scored first as QB Tony Romo completed a 5-yard TD pass to WR Terrell Owens. The Vikings would respond with RB Adrian Peterson getting a 20-yard TD run. In the second quarter, Minnesota took the lead after a turnover. WR Patrick Crayton fumbled a pass, which was picked up LB Ben Leber, who later lateraled the ball to CB Cedric Griffin, who would eventually fumble and recover the ball at the Cowboys 28-yard line and run it into the end zone for a touchdown.

In the third quarter, RB Marion Barber got a 1-yard TD run, while safety Pat Watkins returned a blocked field goal by Chris Canty 68 yards for a touchdown. It would mark the first time that a Cowboy player returned a blocked field goal since Ed "Too Tall" Jones in 1983 against the New Orleans Saints on September 25, 1983. In the fourth quarter, Dallas sealed the victory with rookie Nick Folk getting a 45-yard field goal.

With the win, the Cowboys entered their bye week at 6–1.

==== Scoring summary ====
- Q1 – DAL TD – Terrell Owens, 5 yd pass from Tony Romo (Nick Folk kick), 6:36. (DAL 7–0)
- Q1 – MIN TD – Adrian Peterson, 20 yd run (Ryan Longwell kick), 0:43. (7–7)
- Q2 – MIN TD – Cedric Griffin, 28 yd fumble return (Longwell kick), 1:39. (MIN 14–7)
- Q3 – DAL TD – Marion Barber, 1 yd run (Folk kick), 6:55. (14–14)
- Q3 – DAL TD – Pat Watkins, 68 yd blocked FG return (Folk kick), 2:52. (DAL 21–14)
- Q4 – DAL FG – Nick Folk, 45 yd field goal, 10:34. (DAL 24–14)

=== Week 9: at Philadelphia Eagles ===
| Quarter | 1 | 2 | 3 | 4 | Total |
|---|---|---|---|---|---|
| Cowboys | 14 | 7 | 14 | 3 | 38 |
| Eagles | 7 | 0 | 3 | 7 | 17 |

at Lincoln Financial Field, Philadelphia, Pennsylvania

- Game time: 8:15 pm EDT
- Game weather: 49 °F or 9.4 °C
- Game attendance: 67,688
- Referee: Scott Green
- TV announcers (NBC): Al Michaels (play-by-play), John Madden (color commentator), & Andrea Kremer (sideline reporter)

Coming off their bye week, the Cowboys flew to Lincoln Financial Field for Week 9 Sunday night divisional game against the Philadelphia Eagles. In the first quarter, Dallas took the early lead as they turned a first-play Philly fumble into RB Julius Jones' 2-yard TD run. The Eagles would respond with RB Brian Westbrook getting a 3-yard TD run. Afterwards, the 'Boys regained the lead with QB Tony Romo completing a 1-yard TD pass to TE Tony Curtis. In the second quarter, the Cowboys increased its lead with RB Marion Barber getting a 5-yard TD run for the only score of the period.

In the third quarter, Dallas began to pull away as Romo completed a 45-yard TD pass to former Eagles WR Terrell Owens. Philadelphia would reply with kicker David Akers getting a 36-yard field goal. Afterwards, the 'Boys went back to work with Romo completing a 20-yard TD pass to TE Jason Witten. In the fourth quarter, Dallas sealed the win with rookie kicker Nick Folk getting a 22-yard field goal. Afterwards, the Eagles' only response was QB Donovan McNabb completing a 10-yard TD pass to WR Hank Baskett.

With the win, the Cowboys improved to 7–1.

==== Scoring summary ====
- Q1 – DAL – 11:13 – Julius Jones 2-yard TD run (Nick Folk kick) (DAL 7–0)
- Q1 – PHI – 7:38 – Brian Westbrook 3-yard TD run (David Akers kick) (7–7)
- Q1 – DAL – 2:14 – 1-yard TD pass from Tony Romo to Tony Curtis (Folk kick) (DAL 14–7)
- Q2 – DAL – 0:44 – Marion Barber 5-yard TD run (Folk kick) (DAL 21–7)
- Q3 – DAL – 12:44 – 45-yard TD pass from Tony Romo to Terrell Owens (Folk kick) (DAL 28–7)
- Q3 – PHI – 7:43 – David Akers 36-yard FG (DAL 28–10)
- Q3 – DAL – 4:28 – 20-yard TD pass from Tony Romo to Jason Witten (Folk kick) (DAL 35–10)
- Q4 – DAL – 9:57 – Nick Folk 22-yard FG (DAL 38–10)
- Q4 – PHI – 5:51 – 10-yard TD pass from Donovan McNabb to Hank Baskett (Akers kick) (DAL 38–17)

=== Week 10: at New York Giants ===
| Quarter | 1 | 2 | 3 | 4 | Total |
|---|---|---|---|---|---|
| Cowboys | 7 | 10 | 7 | 7 | 31 |
| Giants | 7 | 10 | 0 | 3 | 20 |

at Giants Stadium, East Rutherford, New Jersey

- Game time: 4:15 pm ET
- Game weather: 47 °F or 8.3 °C (clear)
- Game attendance: 78,964
- Referee: Jeff Triplette
- TV announcers (Fox): Joe Buck (play-by-play), Troy Aikman (color commentator), & Pam Oliver (sideline reporter)

Coming off their Sunday night divisional road win over the Eagles, the Cowboys flew to Giants Stadium for an NFC East rematch with the New York Giants. In the first quarter, Dallas shot first as QB Tony Romo completed a 15-yard TD pass to TE Tony Curtis. Afterwards, the Giants responded with QB Eli Manning completing an 8-yard TD pass to TE Jeremy Shockey. In the second quarter, the Cowboys retook the lead as rookie kicker Nick Folk got a 44-yard field goal, yet New York answered with RB Reuben Droughns getting a 1-yard TD run. Dallas reclaimed the lead with Romo completing a 20-yard TD pass to WR Patrick Crayton. However, due to a taunting penalty on LB Kevin Burnett, the Giants were given great field position to get some points prior to halftime. The Cowboys held New York to a 40-yard Lawrence Tynes field goal.

In the third quarter, Dallas regained the lead with Romo completing a 25-yard TD pass to WR Terrell Owens for the only score of the period. In the fourth quarter, the Giants only got a 26-yard field goal from Tynes. Afterwards, the Cowboys completed the season-sweep with Romo and Owens hooking up again on a 50-yard TD pass.

With the win, the Cowboys improved to 8–1.

This would mark the first time since their Super Bowl year of 1995 that the Cowboys began a season at 8–1, and only the fourth time in franchise history that Dallas began at 8–1; the other times were during the 1977 season, and the 1983 season. The Cowboys won the Super Bowl in 1977 and 1995, but lost the wildcard game to the Los Angeles Rams in 1983.

For their season-sweep over New York, Dallas had scored a total of 76 points in the two meetings.

DT Tank Johnson, in his first game with the Cowboys (along with the first game off of his suspension), recorded 3 tackles and a sack.

==== Scoring summary ====
- Q1 – DAL – 11:10 – Tony Curtis, 15-yard TD pass from Tony Romo (Nick Folk kick) (DAL 7–0)
- Q1 – NYG – 6:13 – Jeremy Shockey, 8-yard TD pass from Eli Manning (Lawrence Tynes kick) (7–7)
- Q2 – DAL – 14:56 – Nick Folk 44-yard FG (DAL 10–7)
- Q2 – NYG – 4:33 – Reuben Droughns 1-yard TD run (Tynes kick) (NYG 14–10)
- Q2 – DAL – 0:27 – Patrick Crayton, 20-yard TD pass from Tony Romo (Folk kick) (DAL 17–14)
- Q2 – NYG – 0:01 – Lawrence Tynes 40-yard FG (17–17)
- Q3 – DAL – 7:14 – Terrell Owens, 25-yard TD pass from Tony Romo to (Folk kick) (DAL 24–17)
- Q4 – NYG – 13:18 – Lawrence Tynes 26-yard FG (DAL 24–20)
- Q4 – DAL – 10:43 – Terrell Owens, 50-yard TD pass from Tony Romo (Folk kick) (DAL 31–20)

=== Week 11: vs. Washington Redskins ===
| Quarter | 1 | 2 | 3 | 4 | Total |
|---|---|---|---|---|---|
| Redskins | 7 | 3 | 3 | 10 | 23 |
| Cowboys | 0 | 7 | 7 | 14 | 28 |

at Texas Stadium, Irving, Texas

- Game time: 4:15 p.m. EST
- Game weather: 77 °F or 25 °C
- Referee: Walt Anderson
- TV announcers (Fox): Joe Buck (play-by-play), Troy Aikman (color commentator), & Pam Oliver (sideline reporter)

Coming off their season-sweeping road win over the Giants, the Cowboys went home for a Week 11 NFC East duel with the Washington Redskins, a longtime rival of the Cowboys. In the first quarter, Dallas trailed early as Redskins QB Jason Campbell completed a 19-yard TD pass to TE Chris Cooley for the only score of the period. In the second quarter, the 'Boys got on the board as QB Tony Romo completed a 4-yard TD pass to WR Terrell Owens. Washington would take the lead into halftime as kicker Shaun Suisham managed to get a 45-yard field goal.

In the third quarter, the Cowboys took the lead with Romo and Owens hooking up with each other again on a 31-yard TD pass. The Redskins got close as Suisham kicked a 39-yard field goal. Fortunately, in the fourth quarter, the 'Boys started to run away with the lead as Romo and Owens hooked up with each other for a third time on a 46-yard TD pass. Washington tried to come back as Suisham nailed a 44-yard field goal, yet Dallas continued to roll as Romo hooked up with Owens for the fourth time on a 52-yard TD pass. The Redskins tried to come back as Campbell completed a 5-yard TD pass to WR Santana Moss. Fortunately, the Dallas defense held on for the victory.

With the win, the Cowboys improved to 9–1.

Terrell Owens, with his four touchdown receptions, tied Bob Hayes for the most touchdown receptions by a Cowboys receiver in one game.

==== Scoring summary ====
- Q1 – WSH – 7:52 – Chris Cooley, 19-yard TD pass from Jason Campbell (Shaun Suisham kick) (WSH 7–0)
- Q2 – DAL – 1:16 – Terrell Owens, 4-yard TD pass from Tony Romo (Nick Folk kick) (7–7)
- Q2 – WSH – 0:00 – Shaun Suisham, 45-yard FG (WSH 10–7)
- Q3 – DAL – 2:09 – Terrell Owens, 31-yard TD pass from Tony Romo (Folk kick) (DAL 14–10)
- Q3 – WSH – 0:00 – Shaun Suisham, 39-yard FG (DAL 14–13)
- Q4 – DAL – 11:32 – Terrell Owens, 46-yard TD pass from Tony Romo (Folk kick) (DAL 21–13)
- Q4 – WSH – 9:58 – Shaun Suisham, 44-yard FG (DAL 21–16)
- Q4 – DAL – 7:50 – Terrell Owens, 52-yard TD pass from Tony Romo (Folk kick) (DAL 28–16)
- Q4 – WSH – 3:45 – Santana Moss, 5-yard TD pass from Jason Campbell (Suisham kick) (DAL 28–23)

=== Week 12: vs. New York Jets ===
| Quarter | 1 | 2 | 3 | 4 | Total |
|---|---|---|---|---|---|
| Jets | 0 | 3 | 0 | 0 | 3 |
| Cowboys | 7 | 14 | 3 | 10 | 34 |

at Texas Stadium, Irving, Texas

- Game time: 4:15 pm EDT
- Game weather: 45 °F or 7.2 °C (Light Snow)
- Game attendance: 63,315
- Referee: Bill Carollo
- TV announcers (CBS): Jim Nantz (play-by-play) & Phil Simms (color commentator)

Coming off their divisional home win over the Redskins, the Cowboys stayed at home for a Week 12 Thanksgiving interconference showdown with the New York Jets. In the first quarter, Dallas shot first with RB Marion Barber getting a 7-yard TD run for the only score of the period. In the second quarter, the 'Boys increased their lead with QB Tony Romo completing a 25-yard TD pass to TE Jason Witten, along with CB Terence Newman returning an interception 50 yards for a touchdown, the first of his career. Afterwards, the Jets got their only score of the game as kicker Mike Nugent got a 40-yard field goal.

In the third quarter, the Cowboys increased their lead with rookie kicker Nick Folk getting a 46-yard field goal for the only score of the period. In the fourth quarter, Dallas pulled away with Folk getting a 27-yard field goal & Romo completing a 22-yard TD pass to WR Terrell Owens.

With the win, the Cowboys improved to 10–1.

QB Tony Romo (21/28 for 195 yards with 2 touchdowns and 1 interception), DE Chris Canty (2 tackles, 1 assist, and 1 sack), LB DeMarcus Ware (1 tackle and 3 assists), CB Terence Newman (1 tackle and 1 interception), and LB Greg Ellis (4 tackles and 2 sacks) all ended up getting CBS's All-Iron Award for their performances.

Singer Kelly Clarkson performed in the game's halftime concert.

==== Scoring summary ====
- Q1 – DAL – 10:16 – Marion Barber, 7-yard run (Nick Folk kick) (DAL 7–0)
- Q2 – DAL – 12:09- Jason Witten, 25-yard TD pass from Tony Romo (Nick Folk kick) (DAL 14–0)
- Q2 – DAL – 6:18 – Terence Newman, 50-yard interception return (Nick Folk kick) (DAL 21–0)
- Q2 – NYJ – 0:39 – Mike Nugent 40-yard field goal (DAL 21–3)
- Q3 – DAL – 5:30 – Nick Folk 46-yard field goal (DAL 24–3)
- Q4 – DAL – 11:23 – Nick Folk 27-yard field goal (DAL 27–3)
- Q4 – DAL – 6:12 – Terrell Owens, 22-yard TD pass from Tony Romo (Nick Folk kick) (DAL 34–3)

=== Week 13: vs. Green Bay Packers ===
| Quarter | 1 | 2 | 3 | 4 | Total |
|---|---|---|---|---|---|
| Packers | 10 | 7 | 7 | 3 | 27 |
| Cowboys | 13 | 14 | 0 | 10 | 37 |

at Texas Stadium, Irving, Texas

- Game time: 8:15 pm EDT/7:15 pm CDT
- Game weather: 56 °F or 13.3 °C (Clear)
- Game attendance: 64,167
- Referee: John Parry
- TV announcers (NFL Network): Bryant Gumbel (play-by-play) & Cris Collinsworth (color commentator)

Coming off their Thanksgiving home win over the Jets, the Cowboys stayed at home, donned their throwbacks, and played a Week 13 Thursday night intraconference duel with the Green Bay Packers. This match-up would be the first time since 1990 (Giants & 49ers) that two 10–1 teams would meet each other.

In the first quarter, Dallas trailed early as Packers kicker Mason Crosby made a 47-yard field goal. Afterwards, the 'Boys took the lead as rookie kicker Nick Folk made a 26-yarder and a 51-yard field goal, along with QB Tony Romo completing a 3-yard TD pass to WR Patrick Crayton. Later, Green Bay would reply with RB Ryan Grant getting a 62-yard TD run. In the second quarter, the Cowboys responded with Romo completing a 26-yard TD pass to TE Anthony Fasano, along with a 10-yard TD pass to WR Terrell Owens. The Packers would end the half with QB Aaron Rodgers completing an 11-yard TD pass to WR Greg Jennings.

In the third quarter, Green Bay got a 1-yard TD run for the only score of the period. In the fourth quarter, Dallas' Romo linked up with Crayton again on a 4-yard TD pass. The Packers' Crosby kicked a 52-yard field goal, and the 'Boys' Folk made a 25-yard field goal.

With the win, the Cowboys improved to 11–1 (continuing to be their best start in franchise history) and also clinched a playoff berth. Hall of Fame/Former Cowboy QBs Roger Staubach and Troy Aikman were in attendance as honorary captains, along with the commemoration of the Super Bowl anniversaries of the '77 Cowboys & the '92 Cowboys. The Cowboys won the 10–1 duel with the win and improved to 11–1 while the Packers fell to 10–2. This is the last time to date that the Cowboys have beaten have the Packers at home, as the two teams would not meet in Dallas again until 2013, and the Packers have gone 6-0-1 in Dallas as of 2025.

For Tony Romo, he ended this part of the season with a franchise-best 33 touchdown passes.

==== Scoring summary ====
- Q1 – GB – 11:32 – Mason Crosby 47-yard field goal (GB 3–0)
- Q1 – DAL – 8:23 – Nick Folk 26-yard field goal (3–3)
- Q1 – DAL – 3:15 – Nick Folk 51-yard field goal (DAL 6–3)
- Q1 – DAL – 1:14 – Patrick Crayton, 3-yard TD pass from Tony Romo (Nick Folk kick) (DAL 13–3)
- Q1 – GB – 0:01 – Ryan Grant, 62-yard run (Mason Crosby kick) (DAL 13–10)
- Q2 – DAL – 13:20 – Anthony Fasano, 26-yard TD pass from Tony Romo (Nick Folk kick) (DAL 20–10)
- Q2 – DAL – 9:53 – Terrell Owens, 10-yard TD pass from Tony Romo (Nick Folk kick) (DAL 27–10)
- Q2 – GB – 0:31 – Greg Jennings, 11-yard TD pass from Aaron Rodgers (Mason Crosby kick) (DAL 27–17)
- Q3 – GB – 5:15 – Ryan Grant, 1-yard run (Mason Crosby kick) (DAL 27–24)
- Q4 – DAL – 7:51 – Patrick Crayton, 4-yard TD pass from Tony Romo (Nick Folk kick) (DAL 34–24)
- Q4 – GB – 5:03 – Mason Crosby 52-yard field goal (DAL 34–27)
- Q4 – DAL – 1:03 – Nick Folk 25-yard field goal (DAL 37–27)

=== Week 14: at Detroit Lions ===
| Quarter | 1 | 2 | 3 | 4 | Total |
|---|---|---|---|---|---|
| Cowboys | 0 | 14 | 0 | 14 | 28 |
| Lions | 10 | 10 | 7 | 0 | 27 |

at Ford Field, Detroit, Michigan

- Game time: 1:00 p.m. EST
- Game weather: Game Played Indoors (Domed Stadium)
- Game attendance: 62,759
- Referee: Gerry Austin
- TV announcers (Fox): Joe Buck (play-by-play), Troy Aikman (color commentator), & Pam Oliver (sideline reporter)

Coming off their Thursday night home win over the Packers, the Cowboys flew to Ford Field for a Week 14 interconference duel with the Detroit Lions. In the first quarter, Dallas trailed early as Lions RB T.J. Duckett getting a 32-yard TD run, along with kicker Jason Hanson getting a 19-yard field goal. In the second quarter, the Cowboys got on the board with RB Marion Barber getting a 20-yard TD run. Detroit would answer with Hanson kicking a 36-yard field goal, while RB Kevin Jones getting a 2-yard TD run. The Cowboys ended the half with QB Tony Romo completing an 8-yard TD pass to Barber.

In the third quarter, the Lions replied with Jones getting a 3-yard TD run for the only score of the period. In the fourth quarter, Dallas came back and took the lead with Barber getting a 1-yard TD run and Romo completing a 16-yard TD pass to TE Jason Witten.

With the win, the Cowboys improved to 12–1 and clinched the NFC East crown for the first time since 1998.

=== Week 15: vs. Philadelphia Eagles ===
| Quarter | 1 | 2 | 3 | 4 | Total |
|---|---|---|---|---|---|
| Eagles | 0 | 7 | 0 | 3 | 10 |
| Cowboys | 0 | 3 | 3 | 0 | 6 |

at Texas Stadium, Irving, Texas

- Game time: 4:15 pm EDT/3:15 pm CDT
- Game weather: 49 °F or 9.4 °C (Clear)
- Game attendance: 63,777
- Referee: Larry Nemmers
- TV announcers (Fox): Joe Buck (play-by-play), Troy Aikman (color commentator), & Pam Oliver (sideline reporter)

Coming off their road win over the Lions, the Cowboys went home for a Week 15 NFC East rematch with their hated rival Philadelphia Eagles. After a scoreless first quarter, Dallas shot first with rookie kicker Nick Folk getting a 33-yard field goal. Afterwards, the Eagles responded with QB Donovan McNabb completing a 1-yard TD pass to WR Reggie Brown. In the third quarter, the 'Boys tried to catch up as Folk kicked a 23-yard field goal for the only score of the period. However, in the fourth quarter, Philadelphia extended their lead with kicker David Akers nailing a 21-yard field goal.

With the loss, the Cowboys fell to 12–2, but clinched a first round bye with Seattle's loss earlier in the day.

In Dallas Cowboys lore, the game became known as "The Jessica Simpson Game," due to the attendance of famous pop star Jessica Simpson, who was dating Cowboys QB Tony Romo at the time. Simpson wore a pink version of Romo's jersey and was frequently shown on camera cheering for her boyfriend. Critics of the Cowboys' performance that day would later suggest, perhaps somewhat facetiously, that the reason for Romo and the team's immense struggles was due to the distraction caused by the famous pop star's presence. This game has also been generally marked as the start of the decline of the Super Bowl caliber team the Cowboys fielded that year, due to the celebrity status the players enjoyed that season, as well as the lack of discipline enforced by head coach, Wade Phillips.

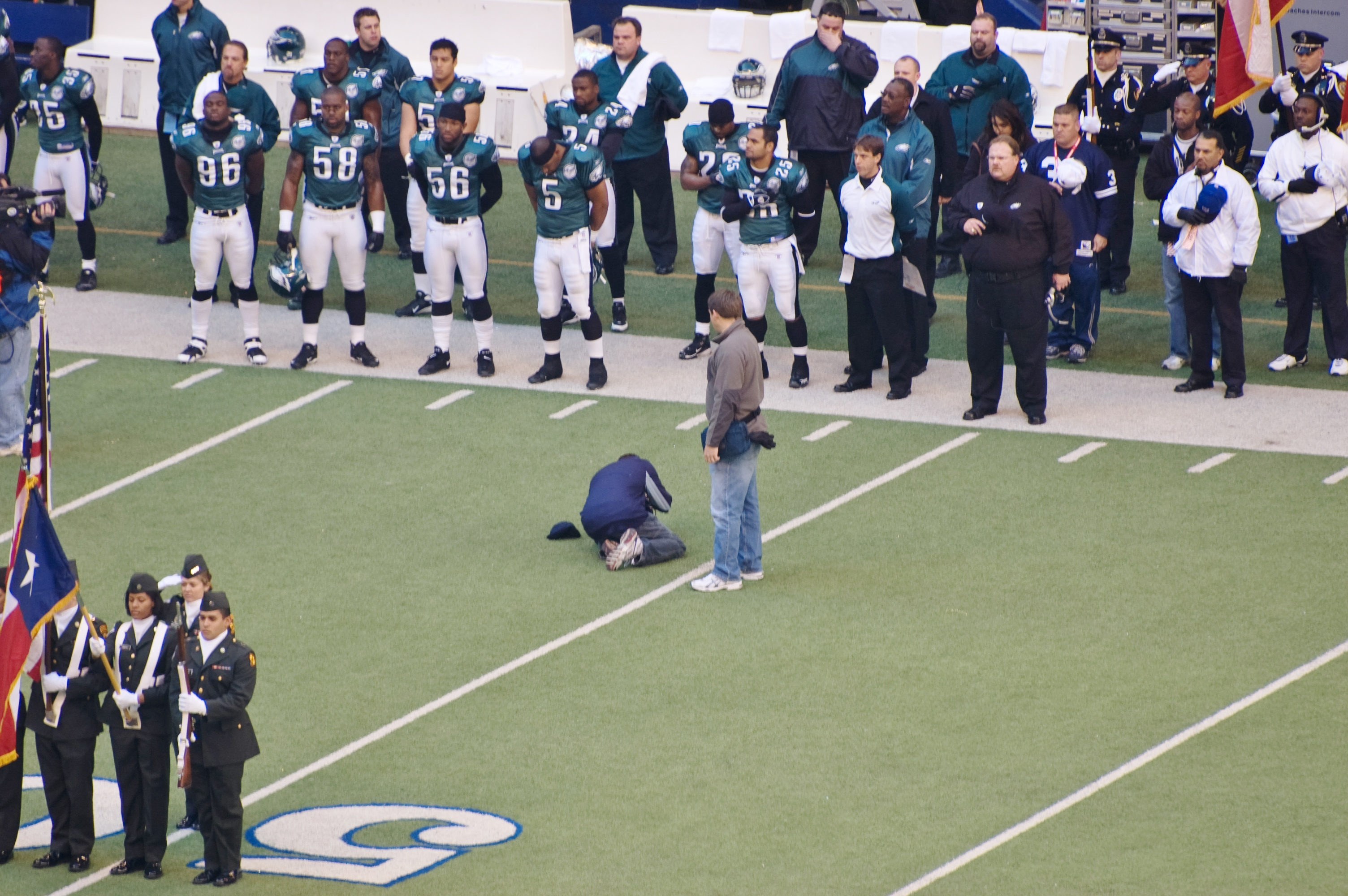
Pregame flag raising ceremony

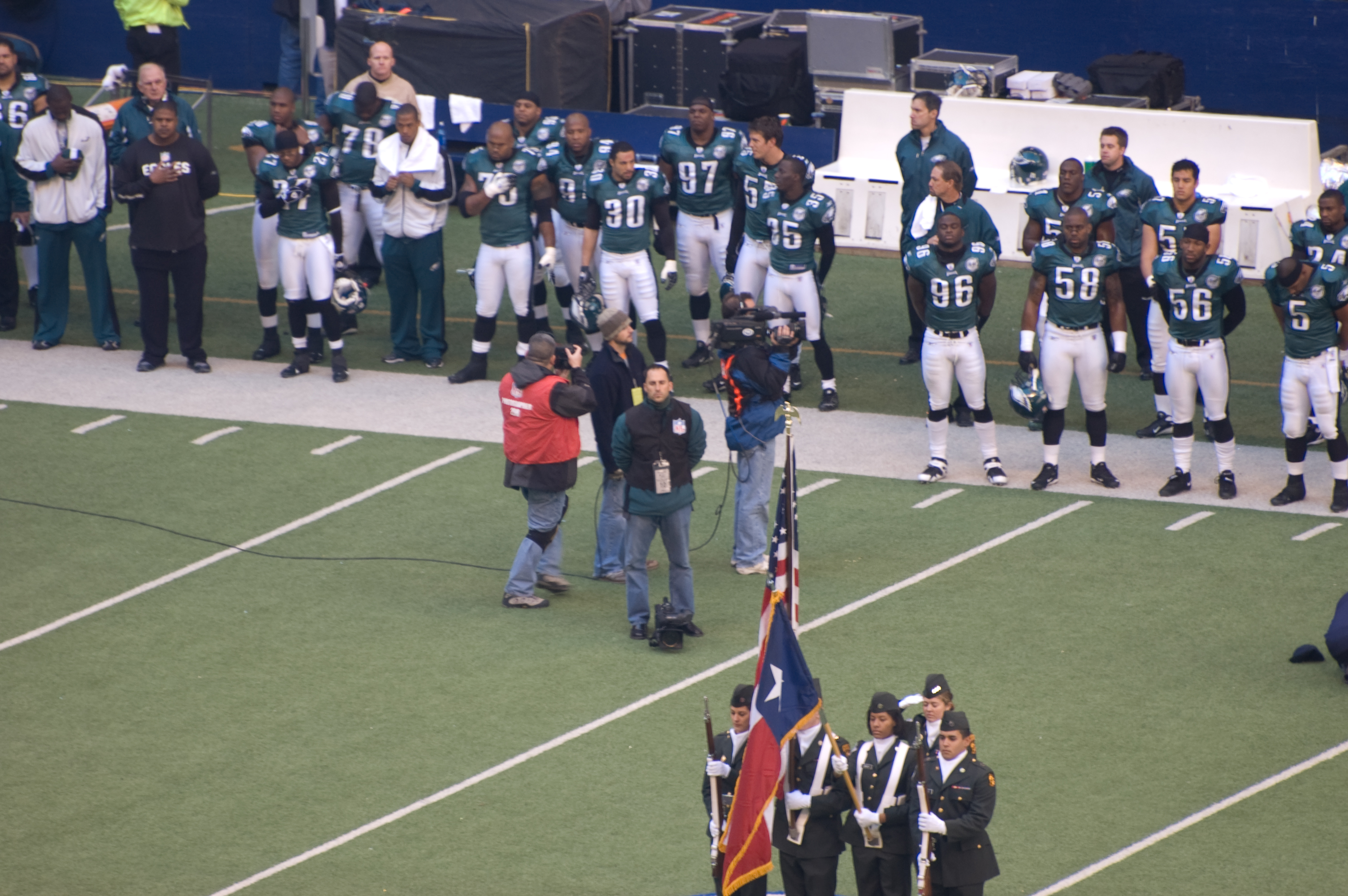
Pregame ceremony cont'd

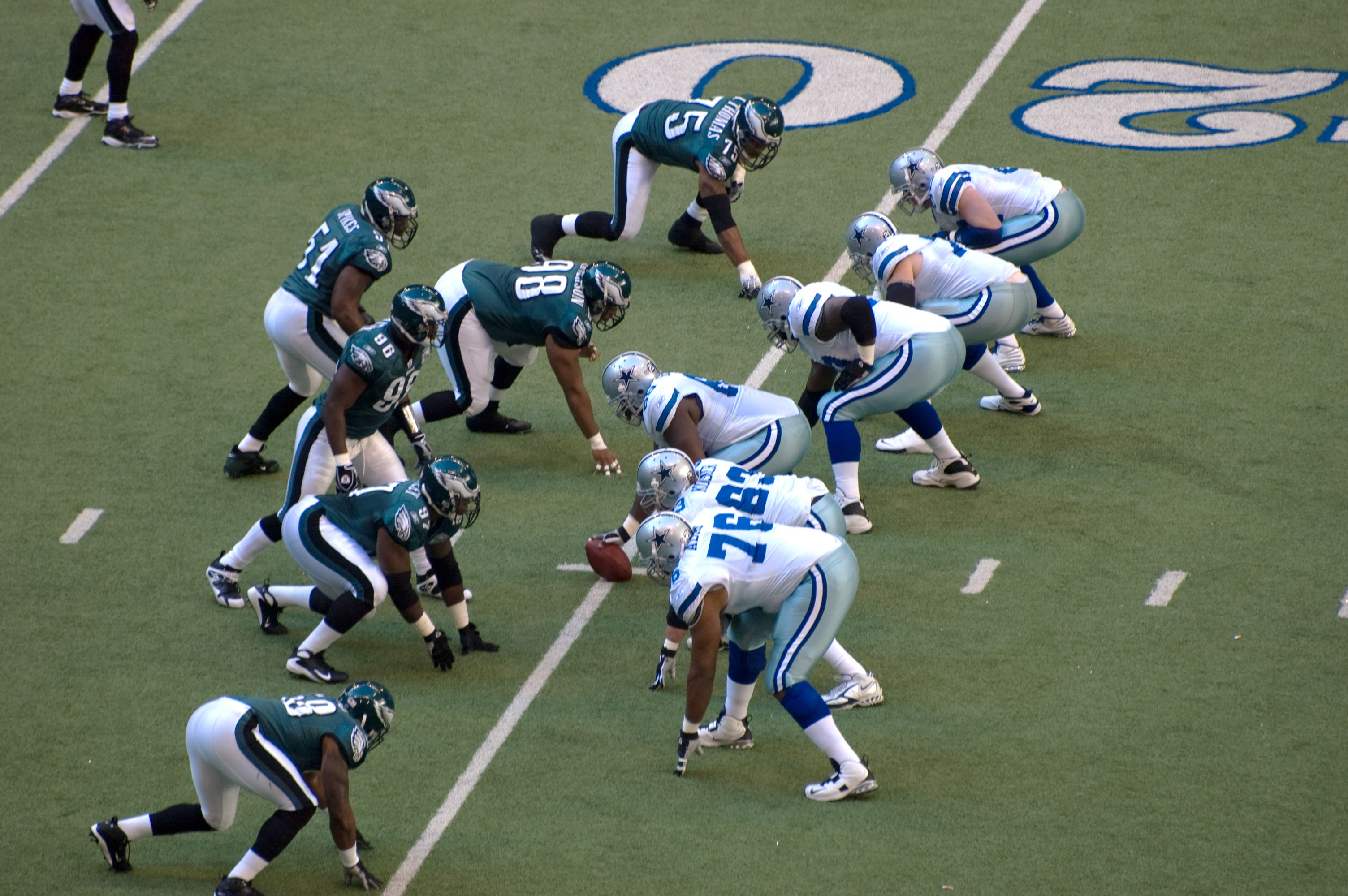
Game action with the Cowboys on offense

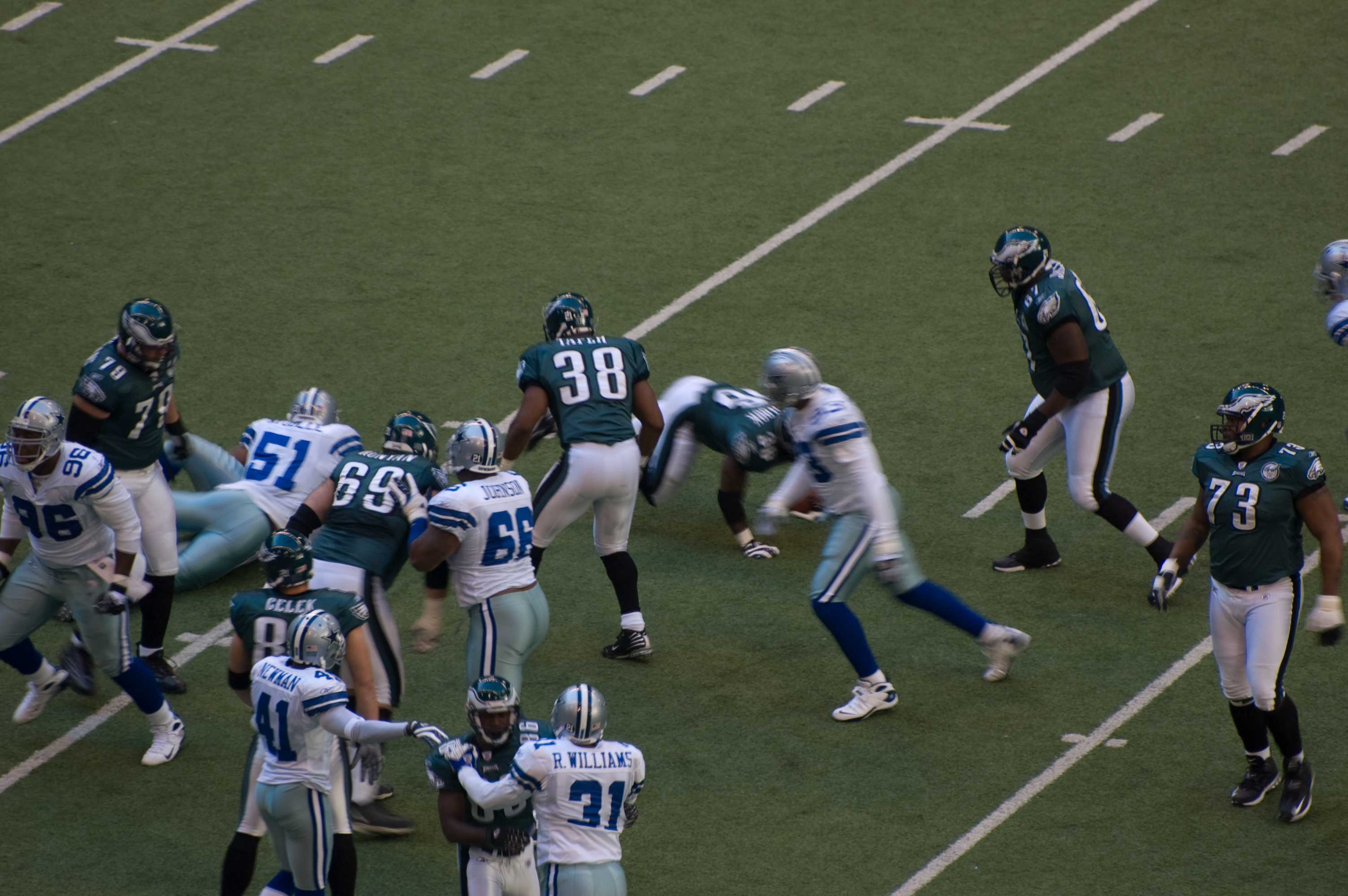
A Philadelphia offensive play

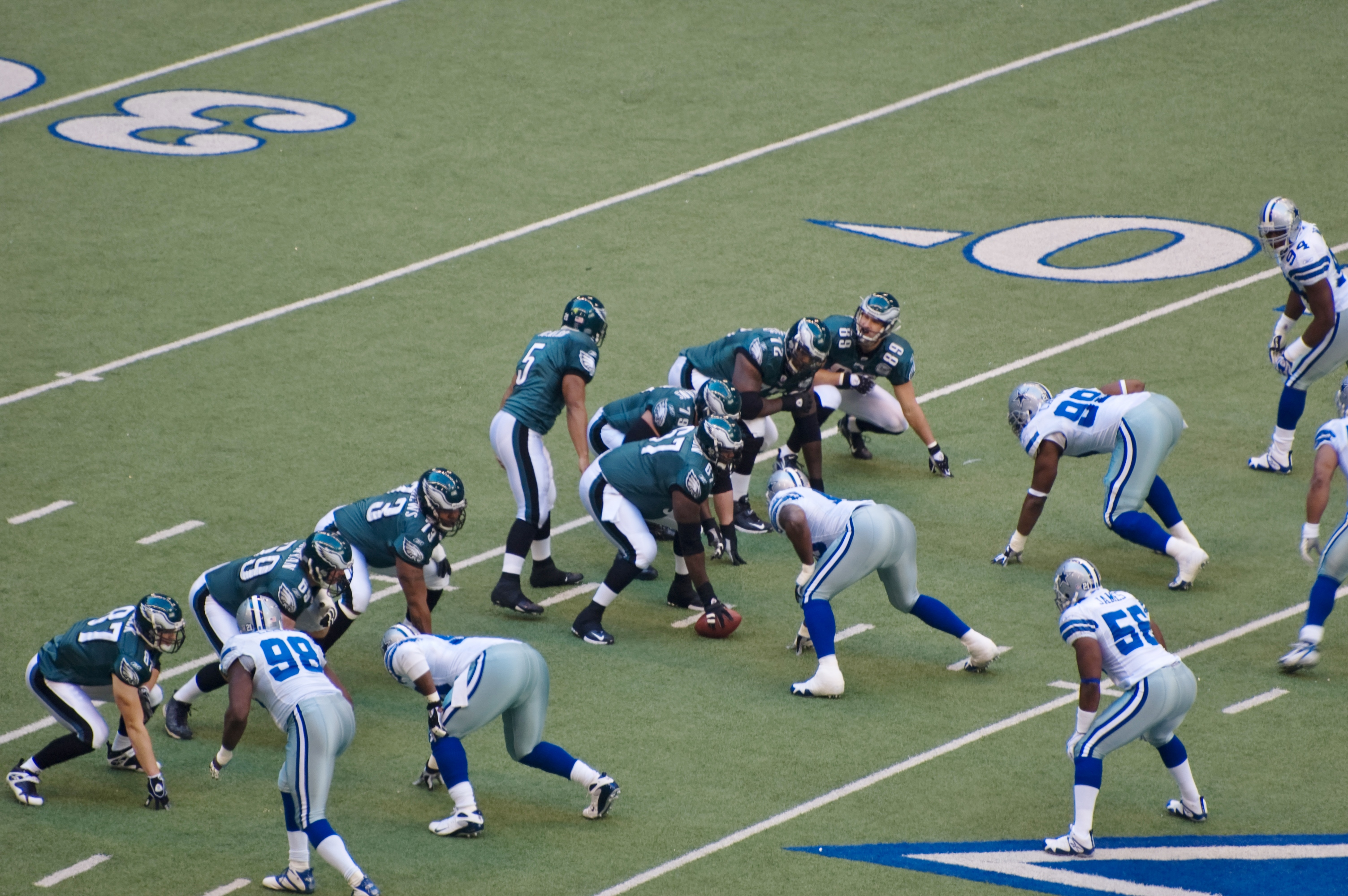
Donovan McNabb (#5) calls plays to Matt Schobel (#89).

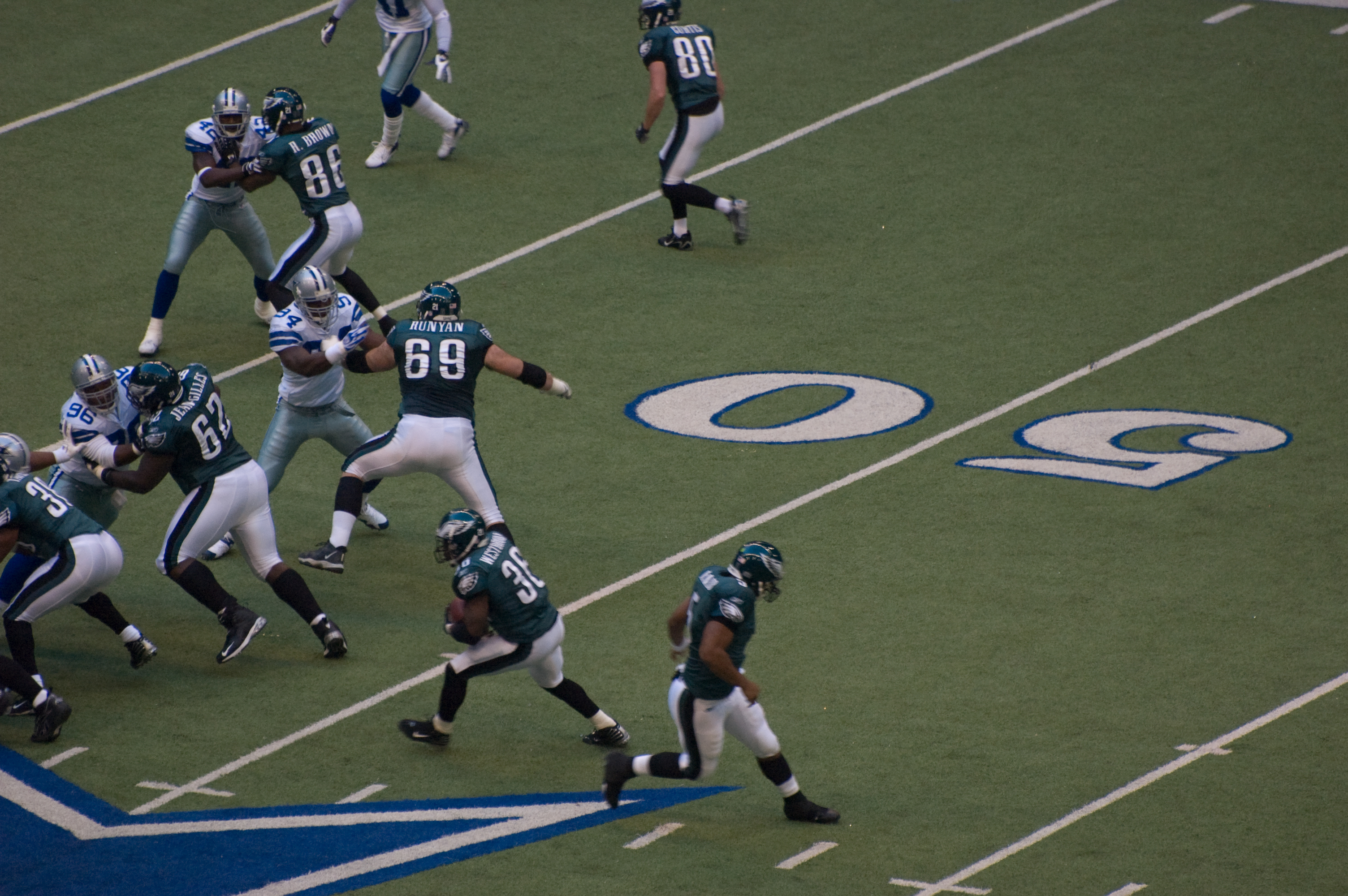
Donovan McNabb hands off to Brian Westbrook

=== Week 16: at Carolina Panthers ===
| Quarter | 1 | 2 | 3 | 4 | Total |
|---|---|---|---|---|---|
| Cowboys | 7 | 10 | 0 | 3 | 20 |
| Panthers | 0 | 7 | 3 | 3 | 13 |

at Bank of America Stadium, Charlotte, North Carolina

- Game time: 8:15 pm EDT
- Game weather: 51 °F or 10.6 °C (Cloudy)
- Game attendance: 73,860
- Referee: Mike Carey
- TV announcers (NFL Network): Bryant Gumbel (play-by-play) & Cris Collinsworth (color commentator)

Hoping to rebound from a divisional home loss to the Eagles, the Cowboys flew to Bank of America Stadium for a Week 16 Saturday night duel with the Carolina Panthers. In the first quarter, Dallas shot first with QB Tony Romo completing a 10-yard TD pass to WR Terrell Owens for the only score of the period. In the second quarter, the 'Boys continued their assault as RB Marion Barber got a 5-yard TD run. The Panthers would get on the board with QB Matt Moore completing an 11-yard TD pass to WR Steve Smith. The Cowboys end the half with rookie kicker Nick Folk getting a 42-yard field goal.

In the third quarter, Carolina started to try a comeback as kicker John Kasay getting a 37-yard field goal for the only score of the period. In the fourth quarter, Dallas would respond with Folk kicking a 23-yard field goal. The Panthers tried to rally as Kasay nailing a 25-yard field goal, yet the 'Boys were able to hold off every possible attempt.

With the win, the Cowboys improved to 13–2 and clinched homefield through NFC Playoffs with Green Bay's loss to Chicago on Sunday.

Terrell Owens (5 receptions for 48 yards and 1 touchdown) left the game in the second quarter with a high left ankle sprain.

=== Week 17: at Washington Redskins ===
| Quarter | 1 | 2 | 3 | 4 | Total |
|---|---|---|---|---|---|
| Cowboys | 0 | 3 | 0 | 3 | 6 |
| Redskins | 7 | 6 | 7 | 7 | 27 |

at FedExField, Landover, Maryland

- Game time: 4:15 pm
- Game weather: 39 °F or 3.9 °C (Rain)
- Game attendance: 90,910
- Referee: Scott Green
- TV announcers (Fox): Joe Buck (play-by-play), Troy Aikman (color commentator), & Pam Oliver (sideline reporter)

Coming off their road win over the Panthers, the Cowboys closed out the regular season at FedExField in a Week 17 NFC East rematch with the Washington Redskins. With everything already wrapped up, the Cowboys had nothing to play for, though they knew the Redskins needed to win to secure the 6th seed in the playoffs.

In the first quarter, Dallas trailed early with Redskins RB Clinton Portis getting a 23-yard TD run for the only score of the period. In the second quarter, Washington increased its lead with kicker Shaun Suisham getting a 46-yard field goal. The Cowboys responded with rookie kicker Nick Folk getting a 37-yard field goal, but the Redskins replied with Suisham kicking a 21-yard field goal.

In the third quarter, Washington continued to lead as Portis got a 1-yard TD run for the only score of the period.In the fourth quarter, the Redskins pulled away as QB Todd Collins completed a 42-yard TD pass to WR Santana Moss. Dallas ended the game with Folk nailing a 30-yard field goal.

With the loss, the Cowboys ended the regular season at 13–3, with the NFC's best record already wrapped up.

== Postseason schedule ==
| Week | Date | Opponent (seed) | Result | Venue | Record | Recap |
|---|---|---|---|---|---|---|
| Wild Card | Bye | | | | | |
| Divisional | January 13, 2008 | New York Giants (5) | L 17–21 | Texas Stadium | 0–1 | Recap |

== Postseason ==
The Cowboys secured a bye and home field advantage throughout the playoffs with an NFC best 13–3 regular season record.

=== NFC Divisional Playoffs: New York Giants ===
| Quarter | 1 | 2 | 3 | 4 | Total |
|---|---|---|---|---|---|
| Giants | 7 | 7 | 0 | 7 | 21 |
| Cowboys | 0 | 14 | 3 | 0 | 17 |

at Texas Stadium, Irving, Texas

- Game time: 4:30 pm EST/1:30 pm PST
- Game weather: 60 °F or 15.6 °C, Clear
- Game attendance: 63,660
- Referee: Pete Morelli
- TV announcers (Fox): Joe Buck, Troy Aikman, Pam Oliver and Chris Myers

Fresh off a bye week, the #1 seed Cowboys hosted the #5 seed New York Giants in the Divisional round of the playoffs. The Giants had beaten the #4 seed Tampa Bay Buccaneers in Tampa Bay in the wild-card round. It was the third time the NFC East division rivals faced off against each other that season, with the Cowboys winning the previous two matchups. The Giants took the opening kickoff and came out firing, hitting the Cowboys with a quick 52-yard touchdown pass from Eli Manning to Amani Toomer. The Cowboys and Giants exchanged punts on the next 2 series before the Cowboy marched 96 yards down the field, scoring on a 5-yard touchdown pass from Tony Romo to Terrell Owens (which was reviewed and upheld), tying the score at 7–7. The Cowboys never faced a 3rd down on the drive.

With the 2nd quarter underway, the Giants punted on the next series, giving the ball to the Cowboys at their own 10-yard line with 11:21 left in the 2nd quarter. The Cowboys marched methodically down the field in small chunks, burning up all but 61 seconds of the clock before Marion Barber bulled into the end zone on a 1-yard touchdown run, making it 14–7 in the Cowboys' favor (the play was reviewed but upheld). With just 61 seconds left in the half, the Giants seemed to catch the Cowboys' defense napping as they quickly moved down the field from their own 29-yard line, stunning the Cowboys with a 4-yard touchdown pass from Manning to Toomer with 11 seconds left in the half. It was Manning and Toomer's 2nd touchdown connection of the first half. The game went into halftime with the score tied at 14–14.

The Cowboys took the opening kickoff, and much like their last drive in the first half, marched very slowly down the field, gaining yards in small increments. After a drop by tight end Anthony Fasano in the end zone, the Cowboys' long drive stalled out and they settled for a 34-yard FG from kicker Nick Folk, to make it 17–14 for the Cowboys. The drive took up over 8 minutes of the 3rd quarter. The next 2 series of the game resulted in punts. After a 25-yard punt return, the Giants had excellent field position at the Dallas 37-yard line. The drive went into the start of the 4th quarter, where Brandon Jacobs rumbled into the end zone for a 1-yard touchdown, to make it 21–17 for the Giants.

As the 4th quarter ticked on, both teams exchanged punts on the next 4 series. With 1:50 left in the game, the Cowboys took over on the Giants' 48-yard line after a short punt return. They marched down to the Giants' 22-yard line with 31 seconds left, still trailing 21–17. On 3rd and 11, with 21 seconds left, Romo lofted a pass into the corner of the end zone that dropped just in front of receiver Patrick Crayton, who had a couple of steps on his defender. Replays showed that Crayton hesitated at the top of his route instead of running straight into the end zone, which is where Romo expected him. The pass fell incomplete as a result. Now on 4th down and 11, with just 16 seconds left, Romo heaved a desperation pass into the back of the end zone, into double coverage, which was intercepted by Giants cornerback R.W. McQuarters, effectively ending the game, 21–17 Giants.

The 2007 Dallas Cowboys became the first #1 seeded NFC team to be eliminated in the divisional round since the San Francisco 49ers in 1987 and the first time it had happened since the then-current playoff format was instituted in 1990. The Giants went on to beat the Green Bay Packers the next week in the NFC Championship Game, then shocked the undefeated New England Patriots in Super Bowl XLII.

==== Scoring summary ====
- Q1 – 11:50 – 52-yard TD pass from Eli Manning to Amani Toomer, Lawrence Tynes extra point is good (7–0 NYG)
- Q2 – 14:56 – 5-yard TD pass from Tony Romo to Terrell Owens, Nick Folk extra point is good (7–7)
- Q2 – 0:53 – 1-yard TD run by Marion Barber, Folk extra point is good (14–7 DAL)
- Q2 – 0:07 – 4-yard TD pass from Manning to Toomer, Tynes extra point is good (14–14)
- Q3 – 6:53 – 34-yard FG by Nick Folk (17–14 DAL)
- Q4 – 13:29 – 1-yard TD run by Brandon Jacobs, Tynes kick is good (21–17 NYG)
