= Rashid Gayle =

American gridiron football player (born 1974)

No. 24
- Position: Defensive back

Personal information
- Born: April 16, 1974 (age 52); Manhattan, New York, U.S.
- Listed height: 5 ft 8 in (1.73 m)
- Listed weight: 174 lb (79 kg)

Career information
- High school: Roseville (CA)
- College: Boise State

Career history
- Jacksonville Jaguars (1996); Tampa Bay Buccaneers (1996–1997)*; BC Lions (1997–1998); Winnipeg Blue Bombers (1999–2000)
- * Offseason or practice squad member only
- Stats at Pro Football Reference

Rashid Gayle (born April 16, 1974) is an American former football defensive back. He played for the Jacksonville Jaguars and the Tampa Bay Buccaneers in 1996, the BC Lions from 1997 to 1998 and for the Winnipeg Blue Bombers from 1999 to 2000.

He has been on two podcasts, one of which being the "You Oughta Know" podcast, the next of which being "Awaken Kingdom Culture".
