= Nate Jones (cornerback) =

American football player (born 1982)

Nathan Jones
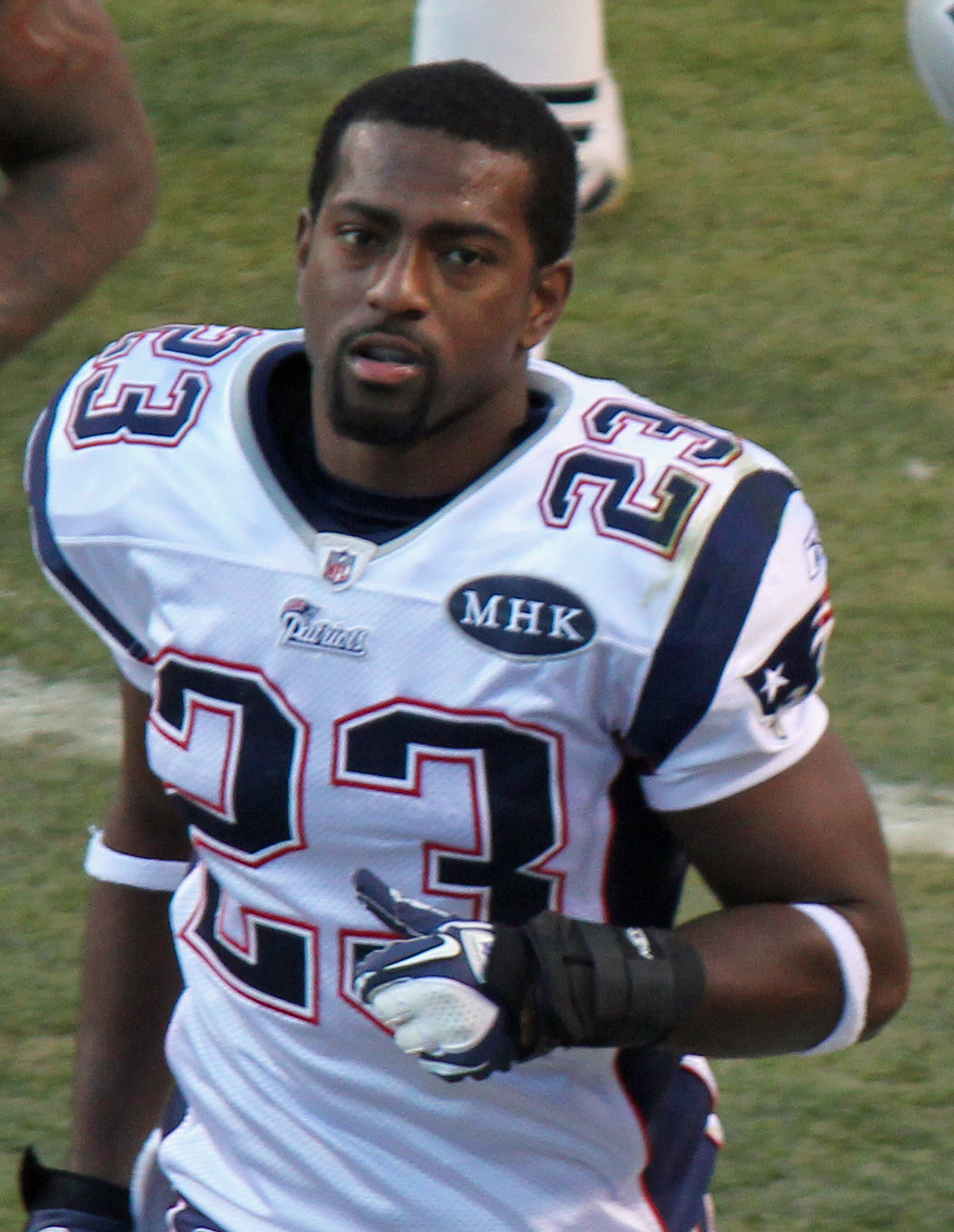
- Jones with the New England Patriots in 2011

No. 33, 23
- Position: Cornerback

Personal information
- Born: June 15, 1982 (age 44); Newark, New Jersey, U.S.
- Listed height: 5 ft 10 in (1.78 m)
- Listed weight: 185 lb (84 kg)

Career information
- High school: Scotch Plains-Fanwood (NJ)
- College: Rutgers
- NFL draft: 2004: 7th round, 205th overall pick

Career history
- Dallas Cowboys (2004–2007); Miami Dolphins (2008–2009); Denver Broncos (2010); Miami Dolphins (2011); New England Patriots (2011)

Awards and highlights
- Big East co-Special Teams Player of the Year (2002); All-Big East (2002); Second-team All-Big East (2003)

Career NFL statistics
- Total tackles: 234
- Sacks: 6.0
- Forced fumbles: 3
- Pass deflections: 17
- Interceptions: 3
- Stats at Pro Football Reference

Nathan Jones (born June 15, 1982) is an American former professional football player who was a cornerback in the National Football League (NFL) for the Dallas Cowboys, Miami Dolphins, Denver Broncos and New England Patriots. He was selected by the Dallas Cowboys in seventh round of the 2004 NFL draft. He played college football for the Rutgers Scarlet Knights. He is currently a game official in the NFL, working as a field judge since the 2019 NFL season. As an NFL field judge, Jones wears the uniform number 33.

== Early life ==
Jones graduated in 2000 from Scotch Plains-Fanwood High School, where he played running back and defensive back.

As a senior, he was a first-team All-state selection and the Offensive Player of the Year in Union County, after recording 2,474 rushing yards, 33 rushing touchdowns, 10 receptions, 227 receiving yards and 3 receiving touchdowns. On defense, he registered 85 tackles, 6 interceptions and 2 fumble recoveries. In a North Jersey II Group III quarterfinal playoff game, Jones rushed for 362 yards and 6 touchdowns.

In 2012, the school retired his jersey number (22).

== College career ==
Jones accepted a football scholarship from Rutgers University. As a redshirt freshman, he played on special teams. The next year, he was a backup cornerback, finishing with 55 tackles, 4 passes defensed, one interception and one forced fumble. His first collegiate interception came against Boston College and returned it 70 yards for a touchdown.

As a junior, he became a starter and was named the Big East Conference co-Special Teams Player of the Year, when he had a pair of 100-yard kickoff returns, including one at Syracuse University and another at the University of Tennessee. Against Syracuse, he also blocked a field goal attempt that was returned 90 yards for a touchdown. Jones was sixth in the nation in 2002 with a 28.3-yard average on 26 kickoff returns, while also blocking two kicks. In addition, he recorded 84 tackles (career-high), 2 interceptions and 7 passes defended. He joined Nate Terry (1997) as the only players in the conference's history to have two 100-yard kickoff returns for touchdowns in a single-season.

As a senior, he started every game (eight at left and two on the right side), tallying 73 tackles, 2 interceptions, 7 passes defensed and one blocked punt. He had 489 yards and one touchdown on 19 kickoff returns (25.7-yard avg).

He finished his career with 219 tackles, 5 interceptions, 18 passes defensed, 2 forced fumbles, 2 fumble recoveries and 3 blocked kicks. He returned 82 kickoffs for 1,902 yards (second in school history), a 23.2-yard average with 3 touchdowns. In 2001, he also lettered in track as a sprinter, running the 100 metres in 10.8 seconds. He graduated with a degree in finance.

Jones was one of eight Division I-A members named to College Football's 2003 National Scholar-Athlete Class by the National Football Foundation and College Hall of Fame.

== Professional career ==
=== Dallas Cowboys ===
Jones was selected by the Dallas Cowboys in the seventh round (205th overall) of the 2004 NFL draft. As a rookie, Jones played in all 16 games with one start. He recorded 31 tackles and a sack. On special teams, he had a pair of tackles while also returning two kickoffs averaging 21.5-yard average. He had four tackles in games against the Cleveland Browns, the Detroit Lions, the Chicago Bears and at the Seattle Seahawks. Against the Lions, Jones recorded the first sack of his NFL career when he sacked Joey Harrington for a 10-yard loss. The first start of his professional career came against the Philadelphia Eagles when the Cowboys opened in nickel package.

In 2005, Jones played in all 16 games as a backup. He made 2 tackles on defense and 13 on special teams (second on the team). He had a season-high three special teams tackles against the Philadelphia Eagles.

In 2006, Jones appeared in four regular season games as a backup. He was inactive for each of the first 12 games of the season. He registered 8 tackles on defense and 3 more on special teams. He made 4 tackles on defense and one on special teams in the season finale against the Detroit Lions. He also had one kickoff return for 13 yards in the game. He played in the Cowboys' wildcard playoff game in Seattle (infamous for Tony Romo's botched snap on a field goal attempt) and was credited with one special teams tackle.

In 2007, Jones appeared in 15 regular season games as a backup, and was inactive for one game. On defense, he posted 17 tackles, one sack and 2 forced fumbles. On special teams, he recorded 8 tackles and 6 kickoff returns averaging 20.3 yards. He had 2 special teams tackles in each of the first two games; against the eventual Super Bowl XLII champion New York Giants and on the road against his future team the Miami Dolphins. He was waived September 18. He was re-signed one day later after the team placed Tank Johnson on the reserved/suspended list. Jones had his best game of the season against the undefeated New England Patriots, on defense, he registered 7 tackles, one sack, 2 forced fumbles and 2 special teams tackles. His two-yard sack of Tom Brady, was the second of his career and the first since his rookie season. He also appeared in Divisional Playoff game against the New York Giants when he had one kickoff return for 21 yards and a tackle on special teams.

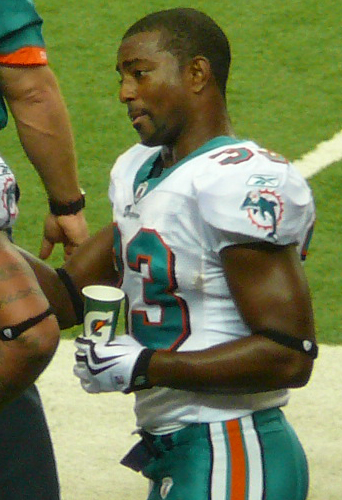
Jones with the Dolphins in 2009

=== Miami Dolphins (first stint) ===
On March 14, 2008, Jones signed a two-year contract as a free agent with the Miami Dolphins. The move reunited him with various coaches and front office personnel from his time with the Cowboys, including head coach Tony Sparano. He played in 16 games (1 start), finishing with 15 tackles (13 solo), one interception and 9 special teams tackles (tied for fifth on the team). His 3 sacks tied the NFL lead for a cornerback and the franchise single-season record for defensive backs.

In 2009, he saw action in 16 games (5 starts), registering 35 tackles, 2 interceptions, 10 passes defensed, 2 forced fumbles and one sack (tying for fifth in Dolphins history in career sacks by a defensive back). He also led the team with 19 special teams tackles (10th in the NFL).

=== Denver Broncos ===
On March 5, 2010, Jones signed with the Denver Broncos as an unrestricted free agent. He recorded 57 tackles while being used as a safety and nickel cornerback. He was released on August 29, 2011.

=== Miami Dolphins (second stint) ===
On September 20, 2011, Jones was signed by the Miami Dolphins. He was cut on October 5.

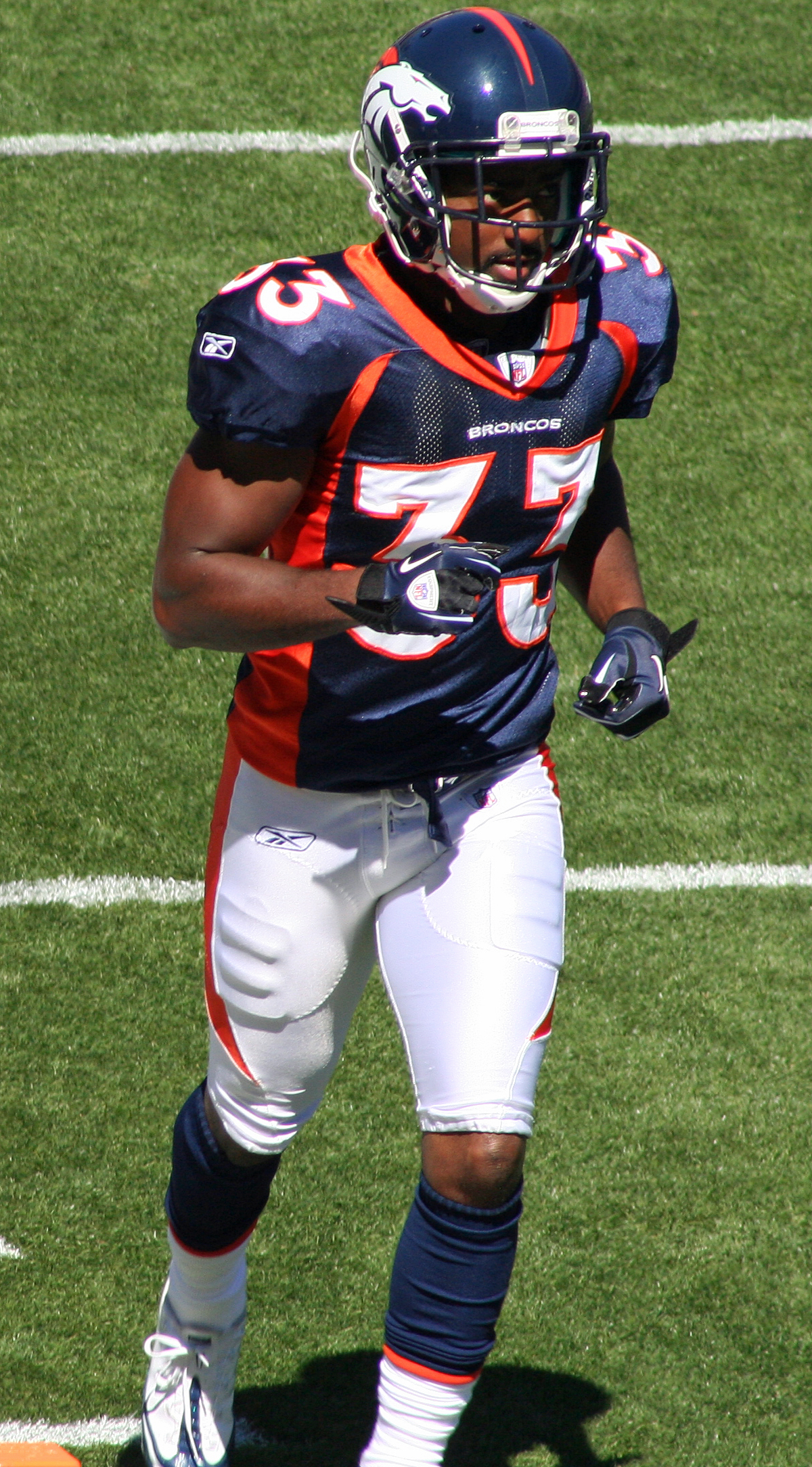
Jones during a game in Denver in September 2010

=== New England Patriots ===
On November 30, 2011, Jones was signed by the New England Patriots and played in five games. He was not re-signed at the end of the season.

== NFL career statistics ==
Legend
| **Bold** | Career high |

=== Regular season ===
| Year | Team | Games | | Tackles | | | | | Interceptions | | | | | Fumbles | | | |
| Year | Team | GP | GS | Cmb | Solo | Ast | Sck | TFL | Int | Yds | TD | Lng | PD | FF | FR | Yds | TD |
|---|---|---|---|---|---|---|---|---|---|---|---|---|---|---|---|---|---|
| 2004 | DAL | **16** | 1 | 33 | 31 | 2 | 1.0 | 2 | 0 | 0 | 0 | 0 | 2 | 0 | 0 | 0 | 0 |
| 2005 | DAL | **16** | 0 | 14 | 8 | 6 | 0.0 | 0 | 0 | 0 | 0 | 0 | 0 | 0 | 0 | 0 | 0 |
| 2006 | DAL | 4 | 0 | 9 | 7 | 2 | 0.0 | 0 | 0 | 0 | 0 | 0 | 0 | 0 | 0 | 0 | 0 |
| 2007 | DAL | 15 | 0 | 23 | 19 | 4 | 1.0 | 1 | 0 | 0 | 0 | 0 | 0 | 1 | 0 | 0 | 0 |
| 2008 | MIA | **16** | 1 | 24 | 20 | 4 | **3.0** | **3** | 1 | 0 | 0 | 0 | 1 | 0 | **1** | 0 | 0 |
| 2009 | MIA | **16** | **5** | 54 | 45 | 9 | 1.0 | 0 | **2** | 0 | 0 | 0 | **10** | **2** | 0 | 0 | 0 |
| 2010 | DEN | **16** | 3 | **57** | **48** | 9 | 0.0 | 0 | 0 | 0 | 0 | 0 | 3 | 0 | 0 | 0 | 0 |
| 2011 | MIA | 2 | 0 | 1 | 1 | 0 | 0.0 | 0 | 0 | 0 | 0 | 0 | 0 | 0 | 0 | 0 | 0 |
| 2011 | NE | 5 | 1 | 19 | 9 | **10** | 0.0 | 0 | 0 | 0 | 0 | 0 | 1 | 0 | 0 | 0 | 0 |
| | | 106 | 11 | 234 | 188 | 46 | 6.0 | 6 | 3 | 0 | 0 | 0 | 17 | 3 | 1 | 0 | 0 |

=== Playoffs ===
| Year | Team | Games | | Tackles | | | | | Interceptions | | | | | Fumbles | | | |
| Year | Team | GP | GS | Cmb | Solo | Ast | Sck | TFL | Int | Yds | TD | Lng | PD | FF | FR | Yds | TD |
|---|---|---|---|---|---|---|---|---|---|---|---|---|---|---|---|---|---|
| 2006 | DAL | **1** | 0 | 1 | **1** | 0 | 0.0 | 0 | 0 | 0 | 0 | 0 | 0 | 0 | 0 | 0 | 0 |
| 2007 | DAL | **1** | 0 | **2** | **1** | **1** | 0.0 | 0 | 0 | 0 | 0 | 0 | 0 | 0 | 0 | 0 | 0 |
| 2008 | MIA | **1** | 0 | **2** | **1** | **1** | 0.0 | 0 | 0 | 0 | 0 | 0 | 0 | 0 | 0 | 0 | 0 |
| 2011 | NE | **1** | 0 | 1 | **1** | 0 | 0.0 | 0 | 0 | 0 | 0 | 0 | 0 | 0 | 0 | 0 | 0 |
| | | 4 | 0 | 6 | 4 | 2 | 0.0 | 0 | 0 | 0 | 0 | 0 | 0 | 0 | 0 | 0 | 0 |

== Officiating ==
Jones has been a football official since at least 2013, having worked in the Pac-12 Conference. In 2019, Jones was also an official in the Alliance of American Football, working as a side judge on the crew led by referee Brandon Cruse. Jones was hired to officiate in the NFL for the 2019 NFL season as a field judge on referee Clay Martin's crew.

== Personal life ==
During the 2005 offseason, Jones worked in financial management with Merrill Lynch. During the 2006 offseason he took classes at the Harvard Business School as part of the NFL's Business Management and Entrepreneurial Program.

In 2007, Jones was developing a sitcom called Jock Itch, which was a sports version of the television show, Friends. He was the executive producer, working closely with Andre Barnwell, a producer, director and writer for such television shows as Comic View, BET Live and Steve Harvey's Big Time Challenge, as well as the movie The Way We Do It.
