= Jacques Reeves =

American football player (born 1982)

No. 35
- Position: Cornerback

Personal information
- Born: October 8, 1982 (age 44); Lancaster, Texas, U.S.
- Listed height: 5 ft 11 in (1.80 m)
- Listed weight: 188 lb (85 kg)

Career information
- High school: Lancaster
- College: Purdue
- NFL draft: 2004: 7th round, 223rd overall pick

Career history
- Dallas Cowboys (2004–2007); Houston Texans (2008–2010); Kansas City Chiefs (2012)

Awards and highlights
- Track Big Ten Conference Freshman of the Year (2001)

Career NFL statistics
- Total tackles: 211
- Forced fumbles: 2
- Fumble recoveries: 3
- Pass deflections: 45
- Interceptions: 6
- Defensive touchdowns: 1
- Stats at Pro Football Reference

Jacques Dimitri Reeves (born October 8, 1982) is an American former professional football player who was a cornerback in the National Football League (NFL) for the Dallas Cowboys, Houston Texans and Kansas City Chiefs. He was selected by the Dallas Cowboys in the seventh round of the 2004 NFL draft. He played college football for the Purdue Boilermakers.

== Early life ==
Reeves attended Lancaster High School. As a senior defensive back, he had 4 interceptions (2 returned for touchdowns) and 5 fumble recoveries. He also practiced track and basketball.

He ran the 200 metres in 20.72 seconds and the 400 metres in 46.01 seconds. He was a member of the Dallas Morning News All-area 100 team.

== College career ==
He accepted a football scholarship from Purdue University. As a true freshman he played on special teams, tallying 11 tackles. The next year, he started 3 games, posting 32 tackles, 2 interceptions and 3 forced fumbles (led the team).

As a junior he became a regular starter, registering 33 tackles and 3 interceptions (tied for the team lead). As a senior, he collected 64 tackles, 2 interceptions, 9 passes defensed and one sack. He played in a total of 49 games, registering 140 tackles (2 for loss), 7 interceptions, 17 passes defensed, 4 forced fumbles and 2 fumble recoveries.

He also practiced track. He received Big Ten Freshman of the Year honors after placing second in the 60 metres (6.80 seconds) and 200 metres (21.04 seconds) at the 2001 Big Ten Indoor Championships. He won the 100 metres (10.41 seconds) and finished second in the 200 metres (20.83 seconds) at the 2002 Big Ten Outdoor Championships. He placed second in the 200 metres (21.47 seconds) and third in the 60 metres (6.78 seconds) at the 2003 Big Ten Indoor Championships.

== Professional career ==
=== Dallas Cowboys ===
Reeves was selected by the Dallas Cowboys in the seventh round (223rd overall) of the 2004 NFL draft. As a rookie, he appeared in 15 games (one start), registering 14 tackles, 4 passes defensed, one fumble recovery, 6 special teams tackles and 13 kickoff returns for 199 yards. The next year, he collected 11 tackles, 4 passes defensed and 9 special teams tackles (seventh on the team).

In 2006, he had 13 special teams tackles (sixth on the team). The next year, he started 13 games mostly in place of an injured Anthony Henry, finishing with a career-high 60 tackles (52 solo) and one interception.

During his time with the Cowboys, he played in 60 games (14 starts), totaling 87 tackles (77 solo), 19 passes defensed and one interception.

=== Houston Texans ===
On March 1, 2008, he was signed as an unrestricted free agent by the Houston Texans to a five-year contract. Reeves started all 16 regular-season games, leading the team with 4 interceptions, while registering 19 passes defensed and 49 tackles (46 solo).

On August 4, 2009, he broke his left fibula in a collision with wide receiver André Davis when both were going for a deep pass in a practice session. Reeves didn't return until Week 8, and made an interception against the Buffalo Bills. The injury limited him to 12 games (5 starts).

He was released on September 3, 2010, after he was demoted to a third-string role. With the Texans he started 21 of 28 games, recorded 77 tackles (69 solo), 5 interceptions and 26 passes defensed.

=== Kansas City Chiefs ===
After two seasons out of football, Reeves signed with the Kansas City Chiefs on February 24, 2012. He was placed on the injured reserve list on September 25, after suffering a hamstring injury. He was waived on September 28 with an injury settlement.

== NFL career statistics ==
Legend
**Bold**	Career high

=== Regular season ===
Year	Team	Games		Tackles					Interceptions					Fumbles			
Year	Team	GP	GS	Cmb	Solo	Ast	Sck	TFL	Int	Yds	TD	Lng	PD	FF	FR	Yds	TD
2004	DAL	15	1	28	25	3	0.0	1	0	0	0	0	2	0	**1**	0	0
2005	DAL	**16**	0	20	16	4	0.0	0	0	0	0	0	4	0	**1**	0	0
2006	DAL	13	0	14	11	3	0.0	0	0	0	0	0	1	0	0	0	0
2007	DAL	**16**	13	**61**	**53**	**8**	0.0	**2**	1	18	0	18	12	**1**	0	0	0
2008	HOU	**16**	**16**	53	49	4	0.0	0	**4**	**108**	**1**	**44**	**19**	**1**	**1**	0	0
2009	HOU	12	5	31	25	6	0.0	0	1	19	0	19	7	0	0	0	0
2012	KAN	2	1	4	4	0	0.0	0	0	0	0	0	0	0	0	0	0
		90	36	211	183	28	0.0	3	6	145	1	44	45	2	3	0	0

=== Playoffs ===
Year	Team	Games		Tackles					Interceptions					Fumbles			
Year	Team	GP	GS	Cmb	Solo	Ast	Sck	TFL	Int	Yds	TD	Lng	PD	FF	FR	Yds	TD
2006	DAL	**1**	0	0	0	0	0.0	0	0	0	0	0	0	0	0	0	0
2007	DAL	**1**	0	**5**	**5**	0	0.0	0	0	0	0	0	0	0	0	0	0
		2	0	5	5	0	0.0	0	0	0	0	0	0	0	0	0	0
