= Roseville High School (Roseville, California) =

Location
- 1 Tiger Way; Roseville, California; United States; 38.75764°N 121.27542°W

Information
- Type: Public
- Established: 1912
- School district: Roseville Joint Union High School District
- Principal: Ashley Serin
- Teaching staff: 71.26 (FTE)
- Grades: 9-12
- Enrollment: 1,551 (2023-2024)
- Student to teacher ratio: 21.77
- Colors: Orange & Black
- Nickname: "The High School On the Hill"
- Team name: Tigers
- Rival: Oakmont High School, Woodcreek High School, Granite Bay High School
- Newspaper: The Eye of the Tiger (Formerly named "Tiger Tracks")
- Website: roseville.rjuhsd.us

Roseville High School is a public high school in Roseville, California, United States. It is a member of the Roseville Joint Union High School District.

== History ==
Roseville High School was established in 1912. In the beginning of its history, RHS served as the primary high school for Roseville and the surrounding areas. As the population of Placer County increased, many schools were added to the Roseville Joint Union High School District. Today, RHS is one of the six major high schools in Roseville, California, and serves many of the residents in central Roseville. Roseville High School was the 2008 Sierra Foothill League Football Champions and CIF Sac-Joaquin Section semi-finalist.

In 2011 a titan arum flower successfully bloomed at the school after 10 years of cultivation, making Roseville the first public high school in the world to successfully bring an Amorphophallus titanum to bloom. The flower bloomed again in September 2020.

== Notable alumni ==
- Evelyn Ashford - five-time medalist in the 100-meter and 4 × 100 m relay and track athlete at five Olympic Games
- Dave Berg - seven-year MLB infielder
- Robbie Bosco - quarterback for BYU during the 1984 and 1985 seasons, and Heisman trophy candidate.
- Tedy Bruschi - linebacker for the New England Patriots and ESPN analyst.
- Megan Dodds - American actress
- Rashid Gayle - Jacksonville Jaguars Defensive back
- Rodney Hannah - tight end for the Dallas Cowboys
- Jordan Kunaszyk - Washington Football Team Linebacker
- Kolton Miller - Oakland Raiders Offensive Tackle
- Mark and Mike Polish - American screenwriters and film producers
- Neilson Powless - American professional cyclist
- Scott Pruett - NASCAR Driver/Racer
- Molly Ringwald - American actress
- Kevin Seconds - lead singer, punk rock band 7 Seconds (band)
