= Deon Anderson =

American football player (born 1983)

No. 34
- Position: Fullback

Personal information
- Born: January 27, 1983 (age 43); Providence, Rhode Island, U.S.
- Listed height: 5 ft 10 in (1.78 m)
- Listed weight: 248 lb (112 kg)

Career information
- High school: Avon Old Farms (CT)
- College: Connecticut
- NFL draft: 2007: 6th round, 195th overall pick

Career history
- Dallas Cowboys (2007–2010); Miami Dolphins (2010)

Career NFL statistics
- Receptions: 9
- Receiving yards: 67
- Receiving touchdowns: 1
- Stats at Pro Football Reference

Deon Terry Anderson (born January 27, 1983) is an American former professional football player who was a fullback who played in the National Football League (NFL) for the Dallas Cowboys. He was selected in the sixth round of the 2007 NFL draft by the Cowboys. He played college football at UConn. He was also a member of the Miami Dolphins.

== Early life ==
Anderson attended Portsmouth Abbey School, before he was expelled because of a campus incident. He transferred to Hope High School after his sophomore season, where he spent one year. He played football, basketball and track and field.

He transferred after his junior season to Avon Old Farms Prep, where he spent 2 years and was a three-sport letterman. In football, he was a two-way player, receiving All-New England and All-Conference honors as a linebacker. He began wrestling as a senior and was named an All-American, winning the state and New England titles as a junior.

== College career ==
Anderson accepted a football scholarship from the University of Connecticut to play linebacker. As a true freshman, he was converted into a fullback and became an immediate starter. He played on all four special teams units (kickoff return and cover, punt return and cover). He collected 34 carries for 11 yards, one rushing touchdown and five receptions for 12 yards.

As a sophomore in 2003, he was used mostly for blocking purposes in the offense. He started five out of 12 games, registering 35 carries for 124 yards, 15 receptions for 148 yards, one receiving touchdown and 11 special teams tackles.

As a junior in 2004, he started three out of 12 games, tallying 22 carries for 99 yards, 14 receptions for 133 yards and 11 special teams tackles.

Anderson missed the 2005 season, after losing his football scholarship because of poor grades and off-the-field problems, which forced him to drop out of school.

As a senior in 2006, he returned after a year out of football, under the condition that he would pay all of his college expenses, so he took out a loan with the help of an aunt and lived during a semester in an abandoned locker room on the campus, until he was able to gain back his scholarship. He started nine out of 11 games, while receiving team MVP honors and was recognized as one of the best special teams players in the nation. He suffered a pinched nerve in his neck that forced him to miss the season finale against the seventh-ranked Louisville. He posted 23 carries for 78 yards, 14 receptions for 101 yards, one touchdown and led the team with nine special teams tackles.

He finished his college career after appearing in 47 games, starting all of the 26 contests that the team opened with a fullback personnel package. He registered 114 carries for 420 yards, one rushing touchdown, 48 receptions for 394 yards and three receiving touchdowns. He also led the team in special teams tackles in each of his four years (40 total tackles) and only missed one game.

== Professional career ==
=== Dallas Cowboys ===
Anderson was selected in the sixth round (195th overall) of the 2007 NFL draft, after the Dallas Cowboys traded up with the Cleveland Browns moving from the 200th to the 195th position, in exchange for a seventh round draft choice (#234-Syndric Steptoe). He was expected to be a difference maker on special teams and was given the nickname "cricket" after eating an insect on a dare during training camp.

As a rookie, he was named the starter at fullback in the third game of the season, replacing an injured Oliver Hoyte. He was placed on the injured reserve list after suffering a rotator cuff injury in the eighth game.

On September 17, 2008, he had his knee scoped and missed two games because of the injury.

On August 13, 2009, he had surgery on his left knee. He was forced to sat out all of the preseason games, but did not miss any regular season contests after returning on September 7. He started 10 games and had no carries, while making 12 special teams tackles (tied for fourth on the team).

On September 16, 2010, he underwent arthroscopic knee surgery after being diagnosed with a torn meniscus. He was waived injured on September 24 and replaced with undrafted free agent Chris Gronkowski.

=== Miami Dolphins ===
On October 19, 2010, Anderson was signed by the Miami Dolphins as a free agent. He was placed on the injured reserve list with a triceps injury just 12 days after signing his contract. He was waived on March 3, 2011.
