= Rodney Hannah =

American football player (born 1987)

No. 44
- Position: Tight end

Personal information
- Born: August 9, 1984; Fresno, California, U.S.
- Died: February 15, 2025 (aged 40); Nashville, Tennessee, U.S.
- Listed height: 6 ft 7 in (2.01 m)
- Listed weight: 260 lb (118 kg)

Career information
- High school: Roseville (Roseville, California)
- College: Houston
- NFL draft: 2007: undrafted

Career history
- Dallas Cowboys (2007–2008); Virginia Destroyers (2011)

Rodney Dee Hannah II (August 9, 1987 – February 15, 2025) was an American former football tight end in the National Football League for the Dallas Cowboys. He also was a member of the Virginia Destroyers in the United Football League. He played college basketball and college football at the University of Houston.

== Early life ==
Hannah was born to Rodney Sr. and Donna Hannah in Fresno, California. Hannah and his family moved to over seven different locations throughout the United States before he was 14, due to his father's professional career. Hannah was initially interested in extreme sports. He became a sponsored athlete in the realm of skateboarding and inline skating at the age of 12.

Upon moving to Roseville, California, Hannah traded in his skateboard for a backboard, picking up basketball while attending Roseville High School as a sophomore. He also intended to play football but his father would not allow it, restricting him from playing football and lifting weights – in concern for stunting his growth. He was finally allowed to play both sports as a senior, becoming one of the top ranked athletes in the country, playing forward in basketball and wide receiver in football. He averaged 13 points and 10 rebounds per game, while being named an All-Conference selection. He finished among the state's top 10 leaders in receiving yards, rebounding and shots blocked.

== College career ==
Hannah enrolled Yuba College, where he focused on playing basketball. As a freshman, he averaged 9 rebounds and 2.5 blocks per game. As a sophomore, he was named an All-Bay Valley Conference selection, after averaging 13.9 points, 8.7 rebounds and 1.9 blocks per game, while helping his team achieve the best season in school history, when Yuba finished with a 24–7 overall record and advanced to the Elite Eight of the California Junior College Tournament.

He transferred to the University of Houston on a basketball scholarship, appearing in 27 games, while averaging 1.9 points and 2.6 rebounds. As a senior in 2006, he was a member of the C-USA Championship football team as a backup tight end, registering 11 receptions for 101 yards and one touchdown.

== Professional career ==
=== Dallas Cowboys ===
Hannah was not selected in the 2007 NFL draft, because he was seen as a raw prospect. On April 23, the Dallas Cowboys signed him as an undrafted free agent, because they liked his physical skills and potential upside. On September 1, he was waived and signed to the practice squad 2 days later, where he spent the rest of the season.

On August 30, 2008, he was cut and later signed to the practice squad. On December 26, he was promoted to the active roster, to take the spot of injured wide receiver Isaiah Stanback.

In 2009, he was competing for the third-string tight end job against rookie John Phillips, but was limited with a broken hand he suffered in OTAs and was released on August 27.

=== Virginia Destroyers (UFL) ===
On August 29, 2011, Hannah was signed by the Virginia Destroyers of the United Football League.

== Death ==
Hannah died on February 15, 2025, after battling a rare form of cancer.
