= Dedrick Harrington =

American football player (born 1983)

No. 58
- Position: Linebacker

Personal information
- Born: September 25, 1983 (age 43); Mexico, Missouri, U.S.
- Listed height: 6 ft 3 in (1.91 m)
- Listed weight: 250 lb (113 kg)

Career information
- High school: Mexico (MO)
- College: Missouri
- NFL draft: 2007: undrafted

Career history
- Dallas Cowboys (2007)*; Indianapolis Colts (2007)*; St. Louis Rams (2008)*; Indianapolis Colts (2008)*
- * Offseason or practice squad member only

Awards and highlights
- Sporting News Big 12 All-Freshman (2003)

Dedrick Harrington (born September 25, 1983) is an American former professional football linebacker. He was signed by the Dallas Cowboys as an undrafted free agent in 2007. He played college football at Missouri.

Harrington was also a member of the St. Louis Rams and Indianapolis Colts.
