= James Marten =

American football player (born 1984)

No. 71, 69
- Position: Offensive tackle

Personal information
- Born: April 18, 1984 (age 42); Indianapolis, Indiana, U.S.
- Listed height: 6 ft 8 in (2.03 m)
- Listed weight: 310 lb (141 kg)

Career information
- High school: Brebeuf Jesuit Preparatory (Indianapolis)
- College: Boston College
- NFL draft: 2007: 3rd round, 67th overall pick

Career history
- Dallas Cowboys (2007); Oakland Raiders (2008); Chicago Bears (2009–2010); Miami Dolphins (2010–2011)*
- * Offseason or practice squad member only

Awards and highlights
- 2× Second-team All-ACC (2005, 2006)

Career NFL statistics
- Games played: 1
- Stats at Pro Football Reference

James P. Marten (born April 18, 1984) is an American former professional football player who was an offensive tackle in the National Football League (NFL). He was selected by the Dallas Cowboys in the third round of the 2007 NFL draft. He played college football for the Boston College Eagles. He was also a member of the Oakland Raiders, Chicago Bears and Miami Dolphins

== Early life ==
Marten attended Brebeuf Jesuit Preparatory School, where he played football. He was a two-time All-state Class 3A and All-county. In 2001, he earned All-Midwest and North-South All-Star honors. He also practiced the discus throw and basketball, where he helped the school win the State Class 3A championship in 2000.

He accepted a football scholarship from Boston College. As a redshirt freshman in 2003, he was the backup to left tackle Jeremy Trueblood and made his first start at right tackle against Colorado State University. In 2004, he was named the starter at left guard. As a junior, he allowed only 1.5 sacks and 3 quarterback pressures in 13 starts.

In 2006, he was moved to left tackle after Trueblood graduated, earning second-team All-ACC honors, after allowing only 1.5 sacks and no quarterback pressures. He started his last 38 games (first 25 at guard and last 13 at tackle).

== Professional career ==
=== Dallas Cowboys ===
Marten was selected by the Dallas Cowboys in the third round (67th overall) of the 2007 NFL draft. He was moved to right tackle and was inactive for every game during his rookie season. The next year, he was tried at left guard, before being released at the start of the 2008 season.

His problems were never helped by the fact that he followed a string of unsuccessful offensive lineman selections, made by the team in the first rounds of the draft: Al Johnson (2003), Jacob Rogers (2004), and Stephen Peterman (2004).

=== Oakland Raiders ===
On September 8, 2008, he was claimed by the Oakland Raiders. That season, he was active in one game as a reserve against the Buffalo Bills and would eventually be waived before the start of the 2009 season.

=== Chicago Bears ===
The Chicago Bears had previously tried to claim Marten, but were beaten by the Raiders due to waiver priority. On September 7, 2009, they were able to sign him to their practice squad, before promoting him to the active roster on December 14, although he would not appear in a game that season. He was waived before the start of the 2010 season and was signed to the team's practice squad, until being released on December 7.

=== Miami Dolphins ===
On December 9, 2010, he was signed to the Miami Dolphins' practice squad, reuniting with head coach Tony Sparano, who was his offensive line coach in Dallas. After the season, the Dolphins signed him to a two-year contract on January 3, but he retired from professional football on August 5, 2011.
