= Marcus Smith (defensive lineman, born 1984) =

American football player (born 1984)

No. 95
- Position: Defensive end

Personal information
- Born: February 7, 1984 (age 42); San Diego, California, U.S.
- Listed height: 6 ft 4 in (1.93 m)
- Listed weight: 295 lb (134 kg)

Career information
- High school: Mission Bay (CA)
- College: Arizona
- NFL draft: 2007: undrafted

Career history
- Dallas Cowboys (2007–2008)*; Buffalo Bills (2008–2009); Montreal Alouettes (2010); Sacramento Mountain Lions (2011)*; Las Vegas Locomotives (2011–2012)
- * Offseason or practice squad member only

Marcus E. Smith (born February 7, 1984) is an American former football defensive tackle in the National Football League (NFL) for the Dallas Cowboys and Buffalo Bills. He also was a member of the Montreal Alouettes in the Canadian Football League (CFL) and the Las Vegas Locomotives in the United Football League (UFL). He played college football at Arizona.

== Early life ==
Smith attended Mission Bay High School. As a junior, he received All-league honors. As a senior defensive end, he tallied 90 tackles, 10 sacks, 2 interceptions, 5 forced fumbles and returned a fumble 96 yards for a touchdown (CIF-San Diego record). He received All-league, All-San Diego area, San Diego Union Tribune All-county, Prep Football Report All-West and SuperPrep All-Farwest honors. He made the San Diego Union Tribune All-academic team for 3 years.

In basketball, he received All-league honors as a junior. He averaged 17 points and 16 rebounds per game as a senior. He also practiced baseball.

== College career ==
Smith accepted a football scholarship from the University of Arizona. As a true freshman, he appeared in 9 games, making 16 tackles (3.5 for loss), 1.5 sacks and one pass defensed.

As a sophomore, he started 6 out of 12 games at defensive end, collecting 40 tackles (6 for loss), 4 sacks and one fumble recovery. As a junior, he started 11 games, registering 41 tackles (3.5 for loss), 1.5 sacks, 8 passes defensed and one fumble recovery.

As a senior, he suffered a leg injury in the second game and received a medical hardship, while recording 7 tackles and one fumble recovery. As a fifth year senior in 2006, he posted 16 tackles (3 for loss), 3 sacks, 9 passes defensed and 3 fumble recoveries. He finished his college career with 120 tackles (16 for loss) and 10 sacks.

== Professional career ==
=== Dallas Cowboys ===
Smith was signed as an undrafted free agent by the Dallas Cowboys after the 2007 NFL draft on May 2. He was waived on September 1 and signed to the practice squad the next day. He was released on August 30, 2008.

=== Buffalo Bills ===
On October 22, 2008, he was signed to the Buffalo Bills practice squad and moved to defensive tackle. On September 1, 2009, he was released and placed on the injured reserve list on September 3. He was released on February 16, 2010.

=== Montreal Alouettes (CFL) ===
On April 8, 2010, he was signed by the Montreal Alouettes of the Canadian Football League, to play as a defensive tackle. On June 24, he was released and signed to the practice roster. He made his CFL debut in the second game against the Edmonton Eskimos. On July 21, he was signed back to the practice roster.

=== Sacramento Mountain Lions (UFL) ===
On May 17, 2011, he signed with the Sacramento Mountain Lions of the United Football League. He was released before the start of the season.

=== Las Vegas Locomotives (UFL) ===
In 2011, he signed with the Las Vegas Locomotives of the United Football League. In 2012, he was re-signed by the team.
