= Tony Curtis (American football) =

American football player (born 1983)

No. 89
- Position: Tight end

Personal information
- Born: February 11, 1983 (age 43); Fort Lewis, Washington, U.S.
- Listed height: 6 ft 5 in (1.96 m)
- Listed weight: 251 lb (114 kg)

Career information
- High school: Seaside (Seaside, California)
- College: Portland State
- NFL draft: 2005: undrafted

Career history
- Dallas Cowboys (2005–2008); → Cologne Centurions (2007); Kansas City Chiefs (2009)*; Philadelphia Eagles (2009)*; Baltimore Ravens (2009); San Francisco 49ers (2010)*; Washington Redskins (2011)*
- * Offseason or practice squad member only

Career NFL statistics
- Games played: 36
- Receptions: 11
- Receiving yards: 50
- Receiving touchdowns: 3
- Stats at Pro Football Reference

Tony Curtis (born February 11, 1983) is an American former professional football player who was a tight end for the Dallas Cowboys of the National Football League (NFL). He played college football for the Portland State Vikings. He also was a member of the Cologne Centurions, Kansas City Chiefs, Philadelphia Eagles, Baltimore Ravens, San Francisco 49ers, and Washington Redskins.

== Early life ==
Curtis graduated from Seaside High School in Seaside, California. As a senior, he received Monterey County Athlete of the Year, County Defensive Player of the Year and All-county honors.

In basketball, he received All-county and All-league honors as a senior.

== College career ==
Curtis enrolled at Fresno City College under head coach Tony Caviglia. As a freshman, he played on the defensive line. As a sophomore, he was converted into a tight end. After the season, he transferred to Division I-AA Portland State University.

As a junior, he tallied 9 receptions for 79 yards. As a senior, he appeared in 11 games, making 7 receptions for 96 yards and one touchdown. He finished his college career with 16 receptions for 175 yards and one touchdown.

== Professional career ==
=== Dallas Cowboys ===
Curtis was signed as an undrafted free agent by the Dallas Cowboys after the 2005 NFL draft on February 28. He was used mainly as a blocking tight end. He was released on September 3. He was signed to the practice squad on September 4.

In 2006, he was released before the start of the season and signed to the practice squad on September 3. On October 13, he was promoted to the regular roster. He appeared in 4 games (declared inactive in 3 games), before being released on November 24.

On January 10, 2007, he was re-signed by the Cowboys and assigned to the Cologne Centurions in NFL Europa, where he appeared in 9 games (4 starts), while making 14 receptions for 112 yards and 3 touchdown. He would end up making the roster and being named the third-string tight end. On October 8, in a Monday Night Football game against the Buffalo Bills, Curtis recovered an onside kick with 18 seconds remaining to help set up Nick Folk's 53-yard game-winning field goal, giving the Cowboys a 25–24 win. He finished the season with 3 catches, all of which went for touchdowns, 3 special teams tackles and 3 kickoff returns for 27 yards.

On April 11, 2008, he was re-signed as an exclusive-rights free agent to a one-year deal. During the season, he also saw snaps as a blocking fullback. He appeared in 16 games with 6 starts, while tallying 8 receptions for 32 yards. He missed a block in a punt formation, resulting in punter Mat McBriar suffering a broken right foot. He wasn't re-signed at the end of the year.

=== Kansas City Chiefs ===
On April 24, 2009, Curtis was signed as a free agent by the Kansas City Chiefs. He was released on August 4.

=== Philadelphia Eagles ===
On August 25, 2009, he signed with the Philadelphia Eagles as a free agent, to compete for the third-string tight end role. He was waived on September 8.

=== Baltimore Ravens ===
On September 22, 2009, Curtis signed with the Baltimore Ravens to replace an injured Obafemi Ayanbadejo. He was declared inactive in 3 games. He was released on October 13, to make room for wide receiver David Tyree.

=== San Francisco 49ers ===
On February 4, 2010, he was signed by the San Francisco 49ers. He was released September 3.

=== Washington Redskins ===
On August 16, 2011, he signed with the Washington Redskins, to provide depth because of a series of injuries at the tight end position. He was released on September 3. In his career, he played in 36 games (6 starts) with 11 receptions for 50 yards and 3 touchdowns.
