= 2009 Dallas Cowboys season =

50th season in franchise history; first in AT&T Stadium

- Owner: Jerry Jones
- General manager: Jerry Jones
- Head coach: Wade Phillips
- Offensive coordinator: Jason Garrett
- Home stadium: Cowboys Stadium

Results
- Record: 11–5
- Division place: 1st NFC East
- Playoffs: Won Wild Card Playoffs (vs. Eagles) 34–14; Lost Divisional Playoffs (at Vikings) 3–34
- All-Pros: Jay Ratliff (1st team); DeMarcus Ware (1st team); Andre Gurode (2nd team); Jason Witten (2nd team)
- Pro Bowlers: Miles Austin WR; Leonard Davis G Andre Gurode C Mike Jenkins CB; Terence Newman CB; Jay Ratliff DT; Tony Romo QB; DeMarcus Ware LB; Jason Witten TE

Uniform
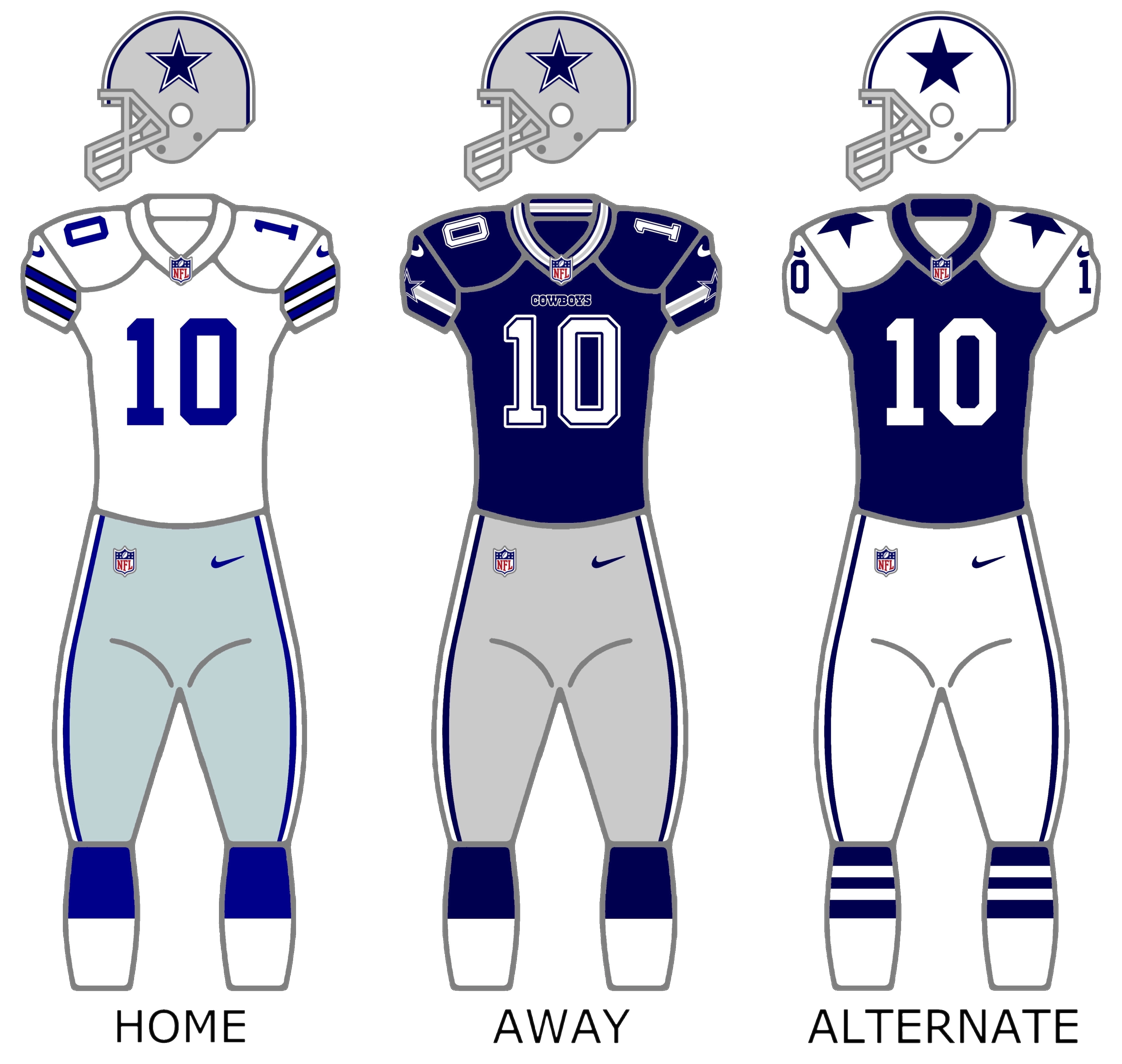

The 2009 Dallas Cowboys season was the 50th anniversary for the team in the National Football League (NFL). It was the team's first season playing their home games at Cowboys Stadium in Arlington, Texas. Their victory over the Oakland Raiders on November 26 extended their Thanksgiving winning streak to four in a row and also ended a three-game losing streak to the Raiders. They also ended the New Orleans Saints' bid for a perfect season after a 13–0 start with a 24–17 victory on December 19, 2009. The Cowboys earned a playoff spot on December 27 after beating the Washington Redskins 17–0. On January 3, 2010, the Cowboys clinched their division with a win over the Philadelphia Eagles, 24–0.

In the wild-card round of the playoffs, the Cowboys once again defeated the Eagles, 34–14, to score their first playoff win since December 28, 1996 and finish the season sweep of all three games played against Philadelphia. They lost 34–3 to the Minnesota Vikings in the divisional round of the playoffs, ending their season.

== Offseason ==
=== Movement ===
After news reports about a 2007 shooting allegation surfaced, the Cowboys released talented but controversial cornerback Adam Jones on February 9, 2009. Their next move was to release backup quarterback Brad Johnson on February 26, 2009 and not to re-sign QB Brooks Bollinger. The Cowboys had been 1–3 when Johnson started in 2008. Two days later, the Cowboys traded starting cornerback Anthony Henry, age 32, to the Detroit Lions in exchange for quarterback Jon Kitna to back up starting quarterback Tony Romo. The same day the team signed five-time Pro Bowl, two-time second-team All-Pro linebacker Keith Brooking away from the Atlanta Falcons. The 33-year-old Brooking had led the Falcons in tackles the previous eight seasons, and he signed a three-year deal worth $7.8 million and includes $2.5 million guaranteed.

The team lost starting defensive end Chris Canty to the New York Giants on March 1, 2009. To fill the need left by Canty's departure, the team signed former Chargers defensive end Igor Olshansky to a four-year, $18 million contract, with $8 million guaranteed on March 6, 2009. Linebacker Matt Stewart, who played for Wade Phillips in Atlanta, and had 108 tackles in 2003, signed a one-year contract on March 3, 2009. Stewart helped replace free-agent linebacker Kevin Burnett, who signed a two-year contract worth $5.5 million with a $2 million signing bonus to play for the San Diego Chargers.

On March 4, 2009, the Cowboys cut Terrell Owens, a five-time All-Pro wide receiver who ranks second in NFL history in career touchdowns. The next morning, the team also released five-time Pro Bowl strong safety Roy Williams. Williams had struggled to excel in the 3–4 defense Phillips installed when he became head coach. The Cowboys bolstered its secondary in the wake of Williams' departure by signing strong safety Gerald Sensabaugh, who started 13 games in 2008 for the Jacksonville Jaguars, to a one-year, $1.75 million deal.

In April, the Cowboys addressed their restricted free agents, whose signing period ran through April 17, 2009. Offensive lineman Cory Procter signed a one-year tender offer on April 4, 2009. Defensive end Stephen Bowen also signed a tender offer two days later. Wide receiver Sam Hurd signed a one-year offer worth $1.545 million on April 20, 2009. The team signed their final restricted free agent, wide receiver Miles Austin, and both exclusive-rights free agents, running back Alonzo Coleman and tight end Rodney Hannah, to one-year contracts worth $1.54 million, $385,000, and $310,000 respectively on April 23, 2009.

The team released thirty-four-year-old, Pro-Bowl defensive end Greg Ellis on June 2, 2009. The move saved the Cowboys $4.15 million.

=== Free agents in 2009 ===
RFA: Restricted free-agent, UFA: Unrestricted free-agent, ERFA: Exclusive rights free agent

Position	Player	Free agency tag	Date signed	2009 team
OG/OL	Joe Berger	UFA	February 27, 2009	Miami Dolphins
WR	Miles Austin	RFA	April 23, 2009	Dallas Cowboys
QB	Brooks Bollinger	UFA		Florida Tuskers
DE	Stephen Bowen	RFA	April 6, 2009	Dallas Cowboys
LB	Kevin Burnett	UFA	March 10, 2009	San Diego Chargers
DE	Chris Canty	UFA	March 1, 2009	New York Giants
RB	Alonzo Coleman	ERFA	April 23, 2009	Dallas Cowboys
OT	Marc Colombo	UFA	December 25, 2008	Dallas Cowboys
TE	Tony Curtis	UFA	April 24, 2009	Kansas City Chiefs
SS	Keith Davis	UFA	May 21, 2009	Oakland Raiders
TE	Rodney Hannah	ERFA	April 23, 2009	Dallas Cowboys
WR	Sam Hurd	RFA	April 20, 2009	Dallas Cowboys
QB	Brad Johnson	Released	February 26, 2009	Retired
DL	Tank Johnson	UFA	April 7, 2009	Cincinnati Bengals
CB	Adam Jones	Released	February 9, 2009	N/A (Suspended for 2009)
P	Sam Paulescu	UFA		Washington Redskins/Tampa Bay Buccaneers
LB	Carlos Polk	UFA		Retired
OG	Cory Procter	RFA	April 4, 2009	Dallas Cowboys
LB	Zach Thomas	UFA	April 13, 2009	Kansas City Chiefs

=== 2009 NFL Draft selections ===
The 2009 NFL draft was one of the worst in the history of the Dallas Cowboys, with many experts comparing it unfavorably to the 1995 "backup draft", by calling it the "special teams draft". Entering the season, the team considered their special teams a glaring weakness, so they hired a new coach (Joe DeCamillis) and focused on drafting players who could contribute immediately on this unit. The Cowboys started the day without a first-round draft choice (part of the price to acquire Roy Williams) and then traded out of the second round after they couldn't draft center Max Unger, reaching a total of 12 picks, which was their most selections since the 1992 NFL draft. The eventual result was that the team couldn't find a starter in the group and most of the players drafted were waived by the 2010 season.

On May 2, 2009 during the rookie mini-camp, the Cowboys air-supported roof practice field (a tent-like structure) collapsed during a storm that turned into a microburst. At the time of the incident, there were around 70 people inside (team personnel, coaches, rookie players and media), leaving 12 people injured. The most serious injuries were suffered by scouting assistant Rich Behm, who was left paralyzed from the waist down after his spine was severed, DeCamillis, the special teams coach, fractured one of his cervical vertebrae and Greg Gaither, the assistant athletic trainer, sustained a fracture to the tibia and fibula in his right leg. The facility was completely destroyed and was never rebuilt. After the incident fallout, Summit Structures, its parent company Cover-All Building Systems and the consulting firm JCI (helped design reinforcements) all filed for bankruptcy after serious structural flaws were found with the construction and manufacturing of the facility.

2009 Dallas Cowboys draft
Round	Pick	Player	Position	College	Notes
3	69	Jason Williams	Linebacker	Western Illinois	from Cleveland
3	75	Robert Brewster	Offensive tackle	Ball State	from Buffalo
4	101	Stephen McGee	Quarterback	Texas A&M	from Detroit
4	110	Victor Butler	Linebacker	Oregon State	from Buffalo
4	120	Brandon Williams	Defensive end	Texas Tech	from Tampa Bay
5	153	DeAngelo Smith	Cornerback	Cincinnati	from Oakland via Atlanta
5	166	Michael Hamlin	Safety	Clemson	from Tennessee
5	172	David Buehler	Placekicker	USC	Compensatory selection
6	197	Stephen Hodge	Safety	TCU	from Miami
6	208	John Phillips	Tight end	Virginia	Compensatory selection
7	227	Mike Mickens	Cornerback	Cincinnati	
7	229	Manuel Johnson	Wide receiver	Oklahoma	from Chicago via Tampa Bay and Detroit
Made roster

Notes

- The Cowboys traded their original first, third and sixth-round selections to the Detroit Lions for wide receiver Roy Williams and a seventh-round selection.
- The Cowboys traded their original second-round selection to the Buffalo Bills for third and fourth-round selections.
- The Cowboys traded their 2008 fourth-round selection to the Cleveland Browns for a 2009 third-round selection.
- The Cowboys traded their 2008 third-round selection to the Detroit Lions in exchange for 2008 and 2009 fourth-round selections.
- The Cowboys traded their original fourth-round selection to the Tampa Bay Buccaneers in exchange for fourth and seventh-round selections.
- The Cowboys traded their original fifth-round selection and seventh-round (acquired from Detroit) selection to the Atlanta Falcons in exchange for a fifth-round selection.
- The Cowboys traded their 2008 fourth-round selection to the Tennessee Titans for cornerback Adam "Pacman" Jones. The Cowboys were to receive a conditional 2009 fourth-round selection (if Jones is not reinstated) or a conditional 2009 fifth-round selection (if Jones is reinstated but gets suspended again).
- The Cowboys traded their 2008 sixth-round selection and defensive tackle Jason Ferguson to the Miami Dolphins for 2008 and 2009 sixth-round selections.
- The suspension of cornerback Pacman Jones on October 15, 2008 triggered a clause in his trade agreement that required Tennessee to give Dallas its fifth-round selection. Had Jones not been suspended, Dallas would have owed Tennessee a sixth-round selection.

=== Undrafted free agents ===
Name	Position	College
Travis Bright	Guard	BYU
Rudy Carpenter	Quarterback	Arizona State
Julian Hawkins	Wide receiver	Boise State
Greg Isdaner	Guard	West Virginia
Kevin Ogletree	Wide receiver	Virginia
Asaph Schwapp	Fullback	Notre Dame
Michael Turkovlch	Tackle	Notre Dame

== Personnel ==
=== Staff / Coaches ===
2009 Dallas Cowboys staff
Front office: Owner/president/general manager – Jerry Jones; COO/executive vice president/director of player personnel – Stephen Jones; Pro scouting coordinator – Will McClay; Director of player development - Bryan Wansley; Director of player administration – Todd Williams; Head coaches: Head coach/defensive coordinator – Wade Phillips; Offensive coaches: Offensive coordinator – Jason Garrett; Quarterbacks – Wade Wilson; Running backs – Skip Peete; Wide receivers – Ray Sherman; Tight ends – John Garrett; Offensive line – Hudson Houck; Quality control/offensive assistant – Wes Phillips	Defensive coaches: Defensive line – Todd Grantham; Linebackers – Reggie Herring; Secondary – Dave Campo; Secondary (safeties) – Brett Maxie; Quality control/assistant linebackers – Dat Nguyen; Special teams coaches: Special teams coordinator – Joe DeCamillis; Assistant special teams coach - Chris Boniol; Strength and conditioning: Strength and conditioning – Joe Juraszek

=== Rosters ===
==== Opening training camp roster ====
2009 Dallas Cowboys opening training camp roster
Quarterbacks: 5 Rudy Carpenter; 3 Jon Kitna; 7 Stephen McGee; 9 Tony Romo; Running backs: 34 Deon Anderson FB; 24 Marion Barber; 23 Tashard Choice; 30 Alonzo Coleman; 39 Julius Crosslin FB; 28 Felix Jones; 29 Keon Lattimore; 45 Asaph Schwapp FB; Wide receivers: 19 Miles Austin; 84 Patrick Crayton; 83 Julian Hawkins; 16 Jesse Holley; 17 Sam Hurd; 81 Mike Jefferson; 87 Manuel Johnson; 85 Kevin Ogletree; 15 Willie Reid; 86 Isaiah Stanback; 11 Roy Williams; Tight ends: 80 Martellus Bennett; 88 Scott Chandler; 44 Rodney Hannah; 89 John Phillips; 82 Jason Witten	Offensive linemen: 76 Flozell Adams T; 60 Travis Bright G; 75 Marc Colombo T; 70 Leonard Davis G; 68 Doug Free T; 62 Ryan Gibbons G/T; 65 Andre Gurode C; 64 Montrae Holland G; 61 Greg Isdaner G; 63 Kyle Kosier G; 77 Pat McQuistan T; 71 Cory Procter G/C; 66 Mike Turkovich T; Defensive linemen: 72 Stephen Bowen DE; 92 Marcus Dixon DE; 97 Jason Hatcher DE; 99 Igor Olshansky DE; 90 Jay Ratliff NT; 67 Derreck Robinson DE; 74 Jonas Seawright NT; 78 Junior Siavii NT; 96 Marcus Spears DE	Linebackers: 51 Keith Brooking ILB; 57 Victor Butler OLB; 54 Bobby Carpenter ILB; 56 Bradie James ILB; 53 Steve Octavien ILB; 50 Justin Rogers OLB; 93 Anthony Spencer OLB; 52 Matt Stewart ILB; 94 DeMarcus Ware OLB; 59 Brandon Williams OLB; 58 Jason Williams ILB; Defensive backs: 20 Alan Ball CB; 27 Courtney Brown FS; 42 Jerome Carter SS; 26 Ken Hamlin FS; 36 Michael Hamlin SS; 37 Mike Hawkins CB; 21 Mike Jenkins CB; 33 Mike Mickens CB; 41 Terence Newman CB; 32 Orlando Scandrick CB; 43 Gerald Sensabaugh SS; 31 DeAngelo Smith FS; 25 Pat Watkins SS; Special teams: 18 David Buehler K; 6 Nick Folk K; 91 L. P. Ladouceur LS; 1 Mat McBriar P	Reserve lists: 95 Tim Anderson NT (Active/PUP); 55 Stephen Hodge ILB (Active/PUP); Unsigned Draft Picks: 79 Robert Brewster OT; Rookies in italics 80 active, 0 inactive, 1 Unsigned

==== Week one roster ====
2009 Dallas Cowboys week one roster
Quarterbacks: 3 Jon Kitna; 7 Stephen McGee; 9 Tony Romo; Running backs: 34 Deon Anderson FB; 24 Marion Barber III; 23 Tashard Choice; 28 Felix Jones KR; Wide receivers: 19 Miles Austin; 84 Patrick Crayton PR; 17 Sam Hurd; 85 Kevin Ogletree; 11 Roy Williams; Tight ends: 80 Martellus Bennett; 89 John Phillips; 82 Jason Witten	Offensive linemen: 76 Flozell Adams T; 75 Marc Colombo T; 70 Leonard Davis G; 68 Doug Free T; 65 Andre Gurode C; 64 Montrae Holland G; 63 Kyle Kosier G; 77 Pat McQuistan T; 69 Duke Preston C; 71 Cory Procter G/C; Defensive linemen: 72 Stephen Bowen DE; 97 Jason Hatcher DE; 99 Igor Olshansky DE; 90 Jay Ratliff NT; 95 Junior Siavii NT; 96 Marcus Spears DE	Linebackers: 51 Keith Brooking ILB; 57 Victor Butler OLB; 54 Bobby Carpenter ILB; 56 Bradie James ILB; 98 Curtis Johnson OLB; 53 Steve Octavien OLB; 93 Anthony Spencer OLB; 94 DeMarcus Ware OLB; 58 Jason Williams ILB; Defensive backs: 20 Alan Ball CB/FS; 26 Ken Hamlin FS; 36 Michael Hamlin FS; 21 Mike Jenkins CB; 41 Terence Newman CB; 32 Orlando Scandrick CB; 43 Gerald Sensabaugh SS; 25 Pat Watkins SS; 27 Marvin White SS; Special teams: 18 David Buehler K; 6 Nick Folk K; 91 L. P. Ladouceur LS; 1 Mat McBriar P	Reserve lists: 79 Robert Brewster T (PUP); 55 Stephen Hodge ILB (IR); 29 Keon Lattimore RB (IR); 59 Brandon Williams OLB (IR); Practice Squad: 60 Travis Bright G; 5 Rudy Carpenter QB; 88 Scott Chandler TE; 39 Julius Crosslin FB; 92 Marcus Dixon DE; 16 Jesse Holley WR; 87 Manuel Johnson WR; 33 Mike Mickens CB; Rookies in italics 53 active, 4 inactive, 8 PS

==== Final roster ====
2009 Dallas Cowboys final roster
Quarterbacks: 3 Jon Kitna; 7 Stephen McGee; 9 Tony Romo; Running backs: 34 Deon Anderson FB; 24 Marion Barber; 23 Tashard Choice; 28 Felix Jones KR; Wide receivers: 19 Miles Austin KR; 84 Patrick Crayton PR; 17 Sam Hurd; 85 Kevin Ogletree KR; 11 Roy Williams; Tight ends: 80 Martellus Bennett; 89 John Phillips; 82 Jason Witten	Offensive linemen: 76 Flozell Adams T; 75 Marc Colombo T; 70 Leonard Davis G; 68 Doug Free T; 65 Andre Gurode C; 64 Montrae Holland G; 63 Kyle Kosier G; 77 Pat McQuistan T; 69 Duke Preston C; 71 Cory Procter C/G; Defensive linemen: 72 Stephen Bowen DE; 97 Jason Hatcher DE; 99 Igor Olshansky DE; 90 Jay Ratliff NT; 95 Junior Siavii NT; 96 Marcus Spears DE	Linebackers: 51 Keith Brooking ILB; 57 Victor Butler OLB; 54 Bobby Carpenter ILB; 56 Bradie James ILB; 98 Curtis Johnson OLB; 53 Steve Octavien OLB; 93 Anthony Spencer OLB; 94 DeMarcus Ware OLB; 58 Jason Williams ILB; Defensive backs: 20 Alan Ball FS; 27 Cletis Gordon CB; 26 Ken Hamlin FS; 36 Michael Hamlin FS; 21 Mike Jenkins CB; 41 Terence Newman CB; 32 Orlando Scandrick CB; 43 Gerald Sensabaugh SS; 25 Pat Watkins SS; Special teams: 18 David Buehler K; 91 L. P. Ladouceur LS; 1 Mat McBriar P; 4 Shaun Suisham K	Reserve lists: 79 Robert Brewster T (PUP); 55 Stephen Hodge LB (IR); 59 Brandon Williams LB (IR); Practice Squad: 60 Travis Bright G; 92 Marcus Dixon DE; 31 Herb Donaldson RB; 29 Marquis Floyd CB; 16 Jesse Holley WR; 15 Manuel Johnson WR; 50 Donovan Woods LB; Rookies in italics 53 active, 3 inactive, 7 practice squad,

== Schedule ==
=== Preseason ===
Week	Date	Opponent	Result	Record	Game site	NFL.com recap
1	August 13	at Oakland Raiders	L 10–31	0–1	Oakland–Alameda County Coliseum	Recap
2	August 21	Tennessee Titans	W 30–10	1–1	Cowboys Stadium	Recap
3	August 29	San Francisco 49ers	L 13–20	1–2	Cowboys Stadium	Recap
4	September 4	at Minnesota Vikings	W 35–31	2–2	Hubert H. Humphrey Metrodome	Recap

=== Regular season ===
Week	Date	Opponent	Result	Record	Game site	NFL.com recap
1	September 13	at Tampa Bay Buccaneers	W 34–21	1–0	Raymond James Stadium	Recap
2	September 20	New York Giants	L 31–33	1–1	Cowboys Stadium	Recap
3	September 28	Carolina Panthers	W 21–7	2–1	Cowboys Stadium	Recap
4	October 4	at Denver Broncos	L 10–17	2–2	Invesco Field at Mile High	Recap
5	October 11	at Kansas City Chiefs *	W 26–20 (OT)	3–2	Arrowhead Stadium	Recap
6	Bye					
7	October 25	Atlanta Falcons	W 37–21	4–2	Cowboys Stadium	Recap
8	November 1	Seattle Seahawks	W 38–17	5–2	Cowboys Stadium	Recap
9	November 8	at Philadelphia Eagles	W 20–16	6–2	Lincoln Financial Field	Recap
10	November 15	at Green Bay Packers	L 7–17	6–3	Lambeau Field	Recap
11	November 22	Washington Redskins	W 7–6	7–3	Cowboys Stadium	Recap
12	November 26	Oakland Raiders *	W 24–7	8–3	Cowboys Stadium	Recap
13	December 6	at New York Giants	L 24–31	8–4	Giants Stadium	Recap
14	December 13	San Diego Chargers	L 17–20	8–5	Cowboys Stadium	Recap
15	December 19	at New Orleans Saints	W 24–17	9–5	Louisiana Superdome	Recap
16	December 27	at Washington Redskins	W 17–0	10–5	FedExField	Recap
17	January 3	Philadelphia Eagles	W 24–0	11–5	Cowboys Stadium	Recap

- These two games were among the 16 that the NFL designated as "AFL Legacy Games", in honor of the 50th anniversary of the AFL. The Cowboys wore their throwback uniforms during those two games, as did the Kansas City Chiefs (formerly the Dallas Texans) and the Oakland Raiders.

== Standings ==
NFC East
	W	L	T	PCT	DIV	CONF	PF	PA	STK
^{(3)} Dallas Cowboys	11	5	0	.688	4–2	9–3	361	250	W3
^{(6)} Philadelphia Eagles	11	5	0	.688	4–2	9–3	429	337	L1
New York Giants	8	8	0	.500	4–2	6–6	402	427	L2
Washington Redskins	4	12	0	.250	0–6	2–10	266	336	L3

== Regular season results ==
=== Week 1: at Tampa Bay Buccaneers ===
Quarter	1	2	3	4	Total
Cowboys	6	7	7	14	34
Buccaneers	0	7	0	14	21

at Raymond James Stadium, Tampa, Florida

- Game time: 1:00 pm EDT (12:00 pm CDT)
- Game weather: 85 °F (29 °C) (Cloudy)
- Game attendance: 63,806
- Referee: Alberto Riveron
- TV announcers (Fox): Kenny Albert, Daryl Johnston, & Tony Siragusa

The Cowboys began their season at Raymond James Stadium for a Week 1 duel with the Tampa Bay Buccaneers. In the first quarter, Dallas shot first as kicker Nick Folk got a 51-yard and a 22-yard field goal. The Buccaneers responded in the second quarter as running back Carnell "Cadillac" Williams got a 1-yard touchdown run. The Cowboys regained the lead as quarterback Tony Romo completed a 42-yard touchdown pass to wide receiver Miles Austin.

Dallas increased their lead in the third quarter as Romo completed a 66-yard touchdown pass to wide receiver Roy Williams. In the fourth quarter, Tampa Bay answered with running back Derrick Ward getting a 1-yard touchdown run, yet the Cowboys struck right back with Romo completing an 80-yard touchdown pass to wide receiver Patrick Crayton, along with running back Marion Barber getting a 6-yard touchdown run. Afterwards, Tampa Bay's rally only produced a 2-yard touchdown pass from quarterback Byron Leftwich to tight end Kellen Winslow.

With the win, Dallas began its season at 1–0.

=== Week 2: vs. New York Giants ===
Quarter	1	2	3	4	Total
Giants	10	10	0	13	33
Cowboys	7	10	7	7	31

at Cowboys Stadium, Arlington, Texas

- Game time: 8:20 pm EDT (7:20 pm CDT)
- Game weather: 84 °F (29 °C) (Partly Cloudy)
- Game attendance: 105,121
- Referee: Mike Carey
- TV announcers (NBC): Al Michaels, Cris Collinsworth, & Andrea Kremer

Coming off their road win over the Buccaneers, the Cowboys would play their very first regular season home game at the new Cowboys Stadium. With an NFL-record regular season crowd on hand, Dallas would play a Sunday night game against their NFC East rival, the New York Giants.

In the first quarter, Dallas trailed early as Giants kicker Lawrence Tynes got a 30-yard field goal. Dallas responded with running back Marion Barber getting a 2-yard touchdown run, but New York retook the lead as cornerback Bruce Johnson returned an interception 34 yards for a touchdown. In the second quarter, the Giants added a Tynes 28-yard field goal to make the score 13–7. The Cowboys responded with a 1-yard Tony Romo touchdown pass to tight end Jason Witten, yet New York went back on top as quarterback Eli Manning completed a 22-yard touchdown pass to wide receiver Mario Manningham, this pass however was juggled but still ruled as a touchdown. Dallas closed out the half as kicker Nick Folk made a 47-yard field goal.

The Cowboys would regain the lead in the third quarter as Romo ran for a 3-yard touchdown. However, in the fourth quarter, the Giants again got the lead as Manning completed a 22-yard touchdown pass to wide receiver Steve Smith, followed by Tynes kicking a 36-yard field goal. Dallas responded with a 7-yard touchdown run from running back Felix Jones. The Giants would respond with a game-winning drive capped by a Lawrence Tynes field goal with no time left to seal a Giants victory and hand the Cowboys their first loss in their new stadium

With the loss, the Cowboys fell to 1-1

=== Week 3: vs. Carolina Panthers ===
Quarter	1	2	3	4	Total
Panthers	0	7	0	0	7
Cowboys	0	0	10	11	21

at Cowboys Stadium, Arlington, Texas

- Game time: 8:30 pm EDT (7:30 pm CDT)
- Game weather: None (Roof Closed)
- Game attendance: 90,588
- Referee: Tony Corrente
- TV announcers (ESPN): Mike Tirico, Ron Jaworski, & Jon Gruden

Hoping to rebound from their tough divisional loss to the Giants, the Cowboys stayed at home for a Week 3 Monday night duel with the Carolina Panthers. After a scoreless first quarter, Dallas trailed in the second quarter as Panthers quarterback Jake Delhomme completed a 25-yard touchdown pass to tight end Dante Rosario. The Cowboys took control in the third quarter as kicker Nick Folk nailed a 24-yard field goal, followed by running back Tashard Choice getting a 5-yard touchdown run. Dallas pulled away with Folk's 19-yard field goal and cornerback Terence Newman returning an interception 27 yards for a touchdown (with Choice getting the 2-point conversion run).

With the win, the Cowboys improved to 2-1

=== Week 4: at Denver Broncos ===
Quarter	1	2	3	4	Total
Cowboys	10	0	0	0	10
Broncos	0	7	0	10	17

at Invesco Field at Mile High, Denver, Colorado

- Game time: 4:15 pm EDT (3:15 pm CDT)
- Game weather: 65 °F (18 °C) (Partly Cloudy)
- Game attendance: 76,440
- Referee: Walt Anderson
- TV announcers (Fox): Joe Buck, Troy Aikman & Pam Oliver

Coming off their Monday night home win over the Panthers, the Cowboys flew to Invesco Field at Mile High for a Week 4 interconference duel with the Denver Broncos. Dallas would deliver the opening shots in the first quarter with kicker Nick Folk making a 49-yard field goal, followed by running back Marion Barber's 1-yard touchdown run. The Broncos would answer in the second quarter with quarterback Kyle Orton completing a 9-yard touchdown pass to running back Knowshon Moreno. After a scoreless third quarter, Denver would take control in the fourth. The Broncos would tie the game with a 28-yard field goal from kicker Matt Prater, and then they would take the lead with Orton's 51-yard touchdown pass to wide receiver Brandon Marshall. The Cowboys would get a late game drive all the way down to Denver's 1-yard line, but the Broncos' defense would hold on for the win.

With the loss, the Cowboys fell to 2-2

=== Week 5: at Kansas City Chiefs ===
Quarter	1	2	3	4	OT	Total
Cowboys	0	3	7	10	6	26
Chiefs	0	10	3	7	0	20

at Arrowhead Stadium, Kansas City, Missouri

- Game time: 1:00 pm EDT (12:00 pm CDT)
- Game weather: 40 °F (4 °C) (Overcast)
- Game attendance: 71,214
- Referee: Ron Winter
- TV announcers (Fox): Joe Buck, Troy Aikman, & Pam Oliver

Hoping to rebound from their road loss to the Broncos, the Cowboys flew to Arrowhead Stadium, donned their throwback uniforms, and played a Week 5 interconference duel with the Kansas City Chiefs. After a scoreless first quarter, Dallas would trail in the second quarter as Chiefs kicker Ryan Succop booted a 47-yard field goal and quarterback Matt Cassel hooked up with linebacker Mike Vrabel on a 1-yard touchdown pass. The Cowboys would close out the half with a 22-yard field goal by kicker Nick Folk.

Kansas City came out in the third quarter with Succop's 38-yard field goal, yet the Cowboys began to take control as running back Tashard Choice got a 36-yard touchdown run. In the fourth quarter, Dallas took the lead as Folk nailed a 28-yard field goal, followed by quarterback Tony Romo completing a 59-yard touchdown pass to wide receiver Miles Austin. However, the Chiefs would tie the game with Cassel's 16-yard touchdown pass to wide receiver Dwayne Bowe. In overtime, the 'Boys came out on top as Romo hooked up with Austin again on a game-winning 60-yard touchdown pass.

Austin finished the game with 250 yards on 10 catches along with the two touchdowns, a Cowboy receiving record.

With the win, the Cowboys went into their bye week at 3-2

=== Week 7: vs. Atlanta Falcons ===
Quarter	1	2	3	4	Total
Falcons	7	0	7	7	21
Cowboys	0	17	7	13	37

at Cowboys Stadium, Arlington, Texas

- Game time: 4:15 pm EDT (3:15 pm CDT)
- Game weather: None (Dome Closed)
- Game attendance: 81,521
- Referee: Scott Green
- TV announcers (Fox): Thom Brennaman, Troy Aikman, & Pam Oliver

Coming off their bye week, the Cowboys went home for a Week 7 duel with the Atlanta Falcons. Dallas would trail in the first quarter as Falcons quarterback Matt Ryan found wide receiver Roddy White on a 4-yard touchdown pass. In the second quarter, the Cowboys came out shooting as kicker Nick Folk made a 38-yard field goal, followed by quarterback Tony Romo completing a 59-yard touchdown pass to wide receiver Miles Austin and a 5-yard touchdown pass to wide receiver Patrick Crayton.

Atlanta tried to catch up in the third quarter with running back Michael Turner's 2-yard touchdown run, yet Dallas answered with Romo finding Austin again on a 22-yard touchdown pass. The Cowboys would increase their lead in the fourth quarter with Folk nailing a 46-yard field goal and Crayton returning a punt 73 yards for a touchdown. The Falcons tried to come back with Ryan's 30-yard touchdown pass to wide receiver Eric Weems, yet Dallas closed out the game with Folk's 34-yard field goal.

With the win, the Cowboys improved to 4-2

=== Week 8: vs. Seattle Seahawks ===
Quarter	1	2	3	4	Total
Seahawks	3	7	0	7	17
Cowboys	7	14	14	3	38

at Cowboys Stadium, Arlington, Texas

- Game time: 1:00 pm EST (12:00 pm CST)
- Game weather: None (Dome Closed)
- Game attendance: 80,886
- Referee: Jerome Boger
- TV announcers (Fox): Dick Stockton & Charles Davis

Coming off their win over the Falcons, the Cowboys stayed at home for a Week 8 duel with the Seattle Seahawks. Dallas would trail early in the first quarter as Seahawks kicker Olindo Mare nailed a 43-yard field goal, yet the Cowboys answered with quarterback Tony Romo completing a 36-yard touchdown pass to wide receiver Sam Hurd. In the second quarter, Dallas increased their lead as running back Marion Barber got a 2-yard touchdown run. The Seahawks would reply with quarterback Matt Hasselbeck's 23-yard touchdown pass to wide receiver Deion Branch, yet the Cowboys came right back with Romo's 7-yard touchdown pass to wide receiver Roy Williams.

Dallas would greatly increase their lead in the third quarter with Romo hooking up with wide receiver Miles Austin on a 3-yard touchdown pass, followed by wide receiver Patrick Crayton returning a punt 82 yards for a touchdown. In the fourth quarter, the Cowboys solidified their win with kicker Nick Folk nailing a 40-yard field goal. Seattle would close out the game's scoring with Hasselbeck's 4-yard touchdown pass to fullback Justin Griffith.

With the win, Dallas improved to 5-2

Crayton would join "Bullet Bob" Hayes as the only Cowboys to have back-to-back games with a punt return for a touchdown.

=== Week 9: at Philadelphia Eagles ===
Quarter	1	2	3	4	Total
Cowboys	7	3	0	10	20
Eagles	0	6	7	3	16

at Lincoln Financial Field, Philadelphia, Pennsylvania

- Game time: 8:20 pm EST (7:20 pm CST)
- Game weather: 61 °F (16 °C) (Cloudy)
- Game attendance: 69,144
- Referee: Walt Coleman
- TV announcers (NBC): Al Michaels, Cris Collinsworth, & Andrea Kremer

Coming off their home win over the Seahawks, the Cowboys flew to Lincoln Financial Field for a Week 9 NFC East duel with the Philadelphia Eagles with both teams fighting for the division lead. Dallas would deliver the opening shot in the first quarter as running back Tashard Choice got a 2-yard touchdown run. The Eagles would answer in the second quarter as kicker David Akers made a 45-yard and a 48-yard field goal, yet the Cowboys came right back with a 22-yard field goal from kicker Nick Folk.

Philadelphia would take the lead in the third quarter as quarterback Donovan McNabb completed an 11-yard touchdown pass to tight end Brent Celek. Afterwards, Dallas would regain the lead in the fourth quarter as Folk booted a 33-yard field goal, followed by quarterback Tony Romo hooking up with wide receiver Miles Austin on a 49-yard touchdown pass. The Eagles tried to rally as Akers nailed a 52-yard field goal, yet the Cowboys would run out the clock and grab the lead in the NFC East. This win was only the Cowboys third win in the last eleven games at Philadelphia and avenged a 44–6 blowout loss at Lincoln Financial Field in the 2008 season finale.

With the win, the Cowboys improved to 6-2

=== Week 10: at Green Bay Packers ===
Quarter	1	2	3	4	Total
Cowboys	0	0	0	7	7
Packers	0	3	0	14	17

at Lambeau Field, Green Bay, Wisconsin

- Game time: 4:15 pm EST (3:15 pm CST)
- Game weather: 47 °F (8 °C) (Clear)
- Game attendance: 70,894
- Referee: Jeff Triplette
- TV announcers (Fox): Joe Buck, Troy Aikman, & Pam Oliver

Coming off a huge divisional win over the Eagles, the Cowboys flew to Lambeau Field for a Week 10 duel with the Green Bay Packers. After a scoreless first quarter, the Packers would acquire the only points of the opening half as kicker Mason Crosby booted a 48-yard field goal. After a scoreless third quarter, Green Bay would extend their lead in the fourth quarter as quarterback Aaron Rodgers got a 1-yard touchdown run and threw a 2-yard touchdown pass to tight end Spencer Havner. Dallas tried to rally as quarterback Tony Romo hooked up with wide receiver Roy Williams on a 9-yard touchdown pass, but the Packers' defense would shut down any further attempt. In this game, the Cowboys avoided a shutout in the final minutes. Their previous shutout was in 2003 against the New England Patriots in which they lost 12–0.

With the loss, the Cowboys fell to 6-3

=== Week 11: vs. Washington Redskins ===
Quarter	1	2	3	4	Total
Redskins	0	3	3	0	6
Cowboys	0	0	0	7	7

at Cowboys Stadium, Arlington, Texas

- Game time: 1:00 pm EST (12:00 pm CST)
- Game weather: None (Dome Closed)
- Game attendance: 85,277
- Referee: Alberto Riveron
- TV announcers (Fox): Joe Buck, Troy Aikman & Pam Oliver

Hoping to rebound from their frustrating loss to the Packers, the Cowboys returned home for their Week 11 NFC East rivalry match against the Washington Redskins. After a scoreless first quarter, Dallas trailed early after Redskins kicker Shaun Suisham nailed a 45-yard field goal. In the third quarter, Suisham booted a 31-yard field goal to keep the Redskins in front, yet in the fourth quarter, Dallas took the lead with quarterback Tony Romo completing a 10-yard touchdown pass to wide receiver Patrick Crayton.

With the close win, the Cowboys improved to 7-3

=== Week 12: vs. Oakland Raiders ===
Quarter	1	2	3	4	Total
Raiders	0	0	7	0	7
Cowboys	3	14	0	7	24

at Cowboys Stadium, Arlington, Texas

- Game time: 4:15 pm EST (3:15 pm CST)
- Game weather: 62 °F (17 °C) (Dome Open)
- Game attendance: 83,489
- Referee: Carl Cheffers
- TV announcers (CBS): Jim Nantz & Phil Simms

Coming off their win over the Redskins, the Cowboys stayed at home for a Week 12 Thanksgiving duel with the Oakland Raiders. In the first quarter, Dallas began their dominating day with kicker Nick Folk booting a 36-yard field goal. The Cowboys would add onto their lead in the second quarter as running back Felix Jones got a 46-yard touchdown, followed by quarterback Tony Romo finding wide receiver Miles Austin on a 9-yard touchdown pass.

The Raiders would try to rally in the third quarter as quarterback Bruce Gradkowski completed a 4-yard touchdown pass to wide receiver Darrius Heyward-Bey, yet Dallas would pull away in the fourth quarter as Romo hooked up with wide receiver Roy Williams.

With the win, the Cowboys improved to 8-3

Romo (18/29, 309 yards, 2 TDs), Austin (7 receptions, 145 yards, 1 TD), & tight end Jason Witten (5 receptions, 107 yards) were named CBS's All-Iron Award winners.

=== Week 13: at New York Giants ===
Quarter	1	2	3	4	Total
Cowboys	0	10	7	7	24
Giants	0	14	7	10	31

at Giants Stadium, East Rutherford, New Jersey

- Game time: 4:15 pm EST (3:15 pm CST)
- Game weather: 37 °F (3 °C) (Clear)
- Game attendance: 79,244
- Referee: Bill Leavy
- TV announcers (Fox): Joe Buck, Troy Aikman and Pam Oliver

Coming off their Thanksgiving win over the Raiders, the Cowboys went to Giants Stadium for the final time to face off against their NFC East rival the New York Giants.

With a scoreless first quarter the Cowboys scored a field goal and touchdown by Tony Romo to Roy Williams. However, the Giants countered by scoring two touchdowns in the second quarter. Nick Folk missed a 57-yard field goal just before halftime. In the third quarter, both teams scored touchdowns and Nick Folk missed a 42-yard field goal which would have put the Cowboys in front. In the fourth quarter the Giants scored two touchdowns, one being a 79-yard punt return by Domenik Hixon. Dallas would score a late touchdown from Romo to Miles Austin but the game ended with the Giants sweeping the series.

Dallas fell to 8-4 with the loss.

=== Week 14: vs. San Diego Chargers ===
Quarter	1	2	3	4	Total
Chargers	7	3	0	10	20
Cowboys	3	0	7	7	17

at Cowboys Stadium, Arlington, Texas

- Game time: 4:15 pm EST (3:15 pm CST)
- Game weather: 70 °F (21 °C) (Roof Open)
- Game attendance: 90,552
- Referee: Gene Steratore
- TV announcers (CBS): Jim Nantz & Phil Simms

With the loss, the Cowboys dropped to 8-5

=== Week 15: at New Orleans Saints ===
Quarter	1	2	3	4	Total
Cowboys	14	3	7	0	24
Saints	0	3	0	14	17

at Louisiana Superdome, New Orleans, Louisiana

- Game time: 8:20 pm EST (7:20 pm CST)
- Game weather: None (Domed Stadium)
- Game attendance: 70,213
- Referee: Terry McAulay
- TV announcers (NFLN): Bob Papa & Matt Millen

Hoping to end the two-game skid from their tough losses to the New York Giants and San Diego Chargers, the Cowboys went to the Superdome to take on the undefeated New Orleans Saints. The Cowboys took the lead in the first half by scoring two touchdowns with a 49-yard pass from Tony Romo to Miles Austin and a 3-yard touchdown run by Marion Barber. Outside linebacker DeMarcus Ware made a big play as he sacked Saints quarterback Drew Brees and caused the ball to be fumbled. Anthony Spencer recovered the ball to put it in Dallas' hands. The Saints only points of the half were from a 43-yard field goal by Garrett Hartley.

In the second half, the Cowboys scored their only touchdown in the third quarter with a two-yard touchdown run by Marion Barber. Finally in the fourth quarter New Orleans got a touchdown when running back Mike Bell scored from one yard out to make a 24–10 Dallas lead. Drew Brees also made a 7-yard touchdown pass to wide receiver Lance Moore. After that, Nick Folk attempted a 24-yard field goal, but the kick was no good. With a big advantage to take the lead as the clock was expiring, the Saints were driving for the game-tying score, but DeMarcus Ware made his second sack on Drew Brees, which again caused the ball to be fumbled. This time the ball was recovered by nose guard Jay Ratliff. With the ball in possession, Dallas took a knee to conclude the game.

With a huge win over the once-undefeated Saints, the Cowboys extended their chances to make the playoffs and ended a two-game losing streak. They improved their record to 9–5.

=== Week 16: at Washington Redskins ===
Quarter	1	2	3	4	Total
Cowboys	7	7	0	3	17
Redskins	0	0	0	0	0

at FedExField, Landover, Maryland

- Game time: 8:20 pm EST (7:20 pm CST)
- Game weather: 37 °F (3 °C) (clear)
- Game attendance: 88,221
- Referee: John Parry
- TV announcers (NBC): Al Michaels and Cris Collinsworth

Coming off a win over the New Orleans Saints, the Cowboys went to FedExField to take on the Washington Redskins. In the first quarter, Tony Romo made a 4-yard touchdown pass to wide receiver Roy Williams. In the second quarter, Marion Barber made a 3-yard touchdown run. The Cowboys ended the first half of the game holding Washington to no points.

The Cowboys got a 23-yard field goal in the second half by their new kicker Shaun Suisham who had played for the Redskins prior to the game. The Redskins continued to be scoreless and ended the game being shut out. This was the first shutout victory over the Redskins since the Cowboys beat them 27–0 on December 14, 2003, and the first time they swept the Redskins since the 2004 season.

With the victory, the Cowboys clinched a spot in the playoffs and improved from their final 9–7 record from the previous season. The win, along with the Packers getting a 48–10 home win over the Seattle Seahawks, also closed the door on the 8–7 New York Giants, who had a 41–9 loss to the Carolina Panthers earlier that day. With the win, the Cowboys improved to 10–5.

=== Week 17: vs. Philadelphia Eagles ===
Quarter	1	2	3	4	Total
Eagles	0	0	0	0	0
Cowboys	7	10	7	0	24

at Cowboys Stadium, Arlington, Texas

- Game time: 4:15 pm EST (3:15 pm CST)
- Game weather: None (Retractible Roof Closed)
- Game attendance: 100,621
- Referee: Ron Winter
- TV announcers (Fox): Joe Buck, Troy Aikman & Pam Oliver

Coming off their shutout victory against Washington, the Cowboys stayed home for their regular season finale against the Philadelphia Eagles in a regular season-sealing claim for the NFC East crown. The Cowboys scored their first touchdown of the game when Tony Romo completed a 10-yard touchdown pass to tight end Jason Witten in the first quarter. In the second quarter, wide receiver Patrick Crayton completed a 14-yard touchdown pass from Tony Romo. Shaun Suisham also nailed a 44-yard field goal. The Cowboys scored their final touchdown of the game when running back Felix Jones ran a 49-yard touchdown. The Eagles could not score the entire game with quarterback Donovan McNabb getting sacked four times.

With the victory, the Cowboys once again reclaimed first place in their division and improved to 11–5 to top off their regular season. This is the first time the Cowboys have swept the series since 2005, and also to snap Dallas's 9-regular season finale losing streak, as well as being the first time the Cowboys won a January game since 2000. The Cowboys would face off with the Eagles again in their first game of the playoffs the next week. This is also the first time Dallas posted back to back shutouts and Tony Romo broke his old team record for single season passing. They finished the regular season with an 11–5 record.

== Post-season results ==
=== NFC Wild-Card Game: vs. Philadelphia Eagles ===
January 9, 2010

Quarter	1	2	3	4	Total
Eagles	0	7	0	7	14
Cowboys	0	27	7	0	34

at Cowboys Stadium, Arlington, Texas

- Game time: 8:00 pm EST
- Game weather: None (Dome Closed)
- Game attendance: 92,951
- Referee: Ed Hochuli
- TV announcers (NBC): Al Michaels, Cris Collinsworth & Andrea Kremer

Entering the playoffs as the NFC's No. 3 seed, the Cowboys began their postseason run at home in "Round 3" against their rival, the No. 6 Philadelphia Eagles, in a rematch of their week 17 victory.

After a scoreless first quarter, Dallas delivered the opening shot in the second quarter with quarterback Tony Romo completing a 1-yard touchdown pass to tight end John Phillips. The Eagles responded with quarterback Michael Vick's 76-yard touchdown pass to wide receiver Jeremy Maclin when cornerback Mike Jenkins fell on the route. Then the Cowboys exploded with points, starting with a 1-yard touchdown run from running back Tashard Choice, a 25-yard field goal from kicker Shaun Suisham, Romo's 6-yard touchdown pass to wide receiver Miles Austin and Suisham's second field goal of the quarter, from 48 yards.

Dallas went back to work in the third quarter with running back Felix Jones' 76-yard touchdown run. Philadelphia tried to rally in the fourth quarter as quarterback Donovan McNabb completed a 4-yard touchdown pass to wide receiver DeSean Jackson, but the 'Boys would drain every last bit of hope needed for a comeback.

The Cowboys and Eagles combined to set an NFL record for the most penalty yards in a playoff game, ever. The two teams were penalized 23 times for 228 yards.

With the win, not only did the Cowboys improve to 12–5 and sweep three games from the Philadelphia Eagles, they finally won their first postseason game since 1996, and head coach Wade Phillips finally got his first postseason win.

=== NFC Divisional: vs. Minnesota Vikings ===
Quarter	1	2	3	4	Total
Cowboys	0	3	0	0	3
Vikings	7	10	0	17	34

at Hubert H. Humphrey Metrodome, Minneapolis, Minnesota

- Game time: 1:00 pm EST
- Game weather: None (Domed Stadium)
- Game attendance: 63,547
- Referee: Walt Anderson
- TV announcers (Fox): Joe Buck, Troy Aikman & Pam Oliver

Coming off their three-game sweep over the Eagles, the Cowboys flew to the Hubert H. Humphrey Metrodome for the NFC Divisional Round against the No. 2 Minnesota Vikings. Dallas would trail in the first quarter as Vikings quarterback Brett Favre completed a 47-yard touchdown pass to wide receiver Sidney Rice. The Cowboys would respond in the second quarter with kicker Shaun Suisham making a 33-yard field goal, but Minnesota struck again as Favre found Rice again on a 16-yard touchdown pass, followed by kicker Ryan Longwell getting a 23-yard field goal. After a scoreless third quarter, the Vikings pulled away in the fourth quarter with Longwell booting a 28-yard field goal, followed by Favre' 45-yard touchdown pass to Rice and an 11-yard touchdown pass to tight end Visanthe Shiancoe.

With the loss, the Cowboys' season ended with an overall record of 12–6 and their first playoff win since 1996.
