= Stephen Bowen (American football) =

American football player (born 1984)

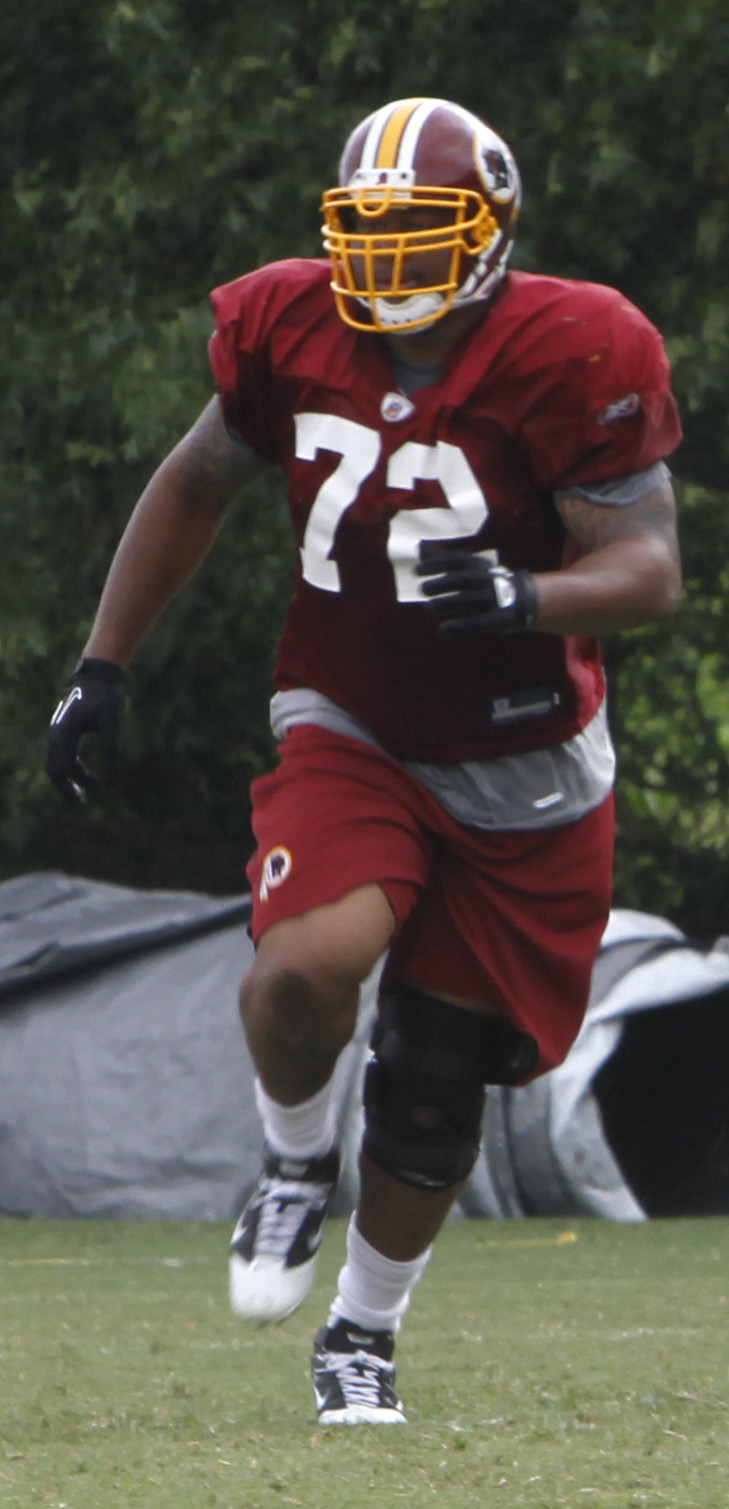
- Bowen with the Washington Redskins in 2011

No. 72
- Position: Defensive end

Personal information
- Born: March 28, 1984 (age 42); Holly Ridge, North Carolina, U.S.
- Listed height: 6 ft 5 in (1.96 m)
- Listed weight: 300 lb (136 kg)

Career information
- High school: Dix Hills (NY) Half Hollow Hills West
- College: Hofstra
- NFL draft: 2006: undrafted

Career history
- Dallas Cowboys (2006–2010); Washington Redskins (2011–2014); New York Jets (2015)

Awards and highlights
- Second-team All-Atlantic 10 (2005)

Career NFL statistics
- Games played: 128
- Total tackles: 157
- Sacks: 12.5
- Forced fumbles: 1
- Fumble recoveries: 1
- Stats at Pro Football Reference

Stephen Alexander Bowen (born March 28, 1984) is an American former professional football player who was a defensive end in the National Football League (NFL) for the Dallas Cowboys, Washington Redskins, and New York Jets. He played college football for the Hofstra Pride.

== Early life ==
Bowen first played pee-wee football for the Baldwin Bombers at the age of 7. From 8 to 10 he played for the Roosevelt Rough Riders then onto North Babylon, NY with his father as his coach for many of his years there.

He attended Half Hollow Hills High School West, where he lettered in both football and basketball. In football, he was a two-way player at running back and linebacker. As a senior, he collected 235 rushing yards, four rushing touchdowns, 330 receiving yards, five receiving touchdowns and 97 tackles.

In 2018, he was inducted into the Suffolk Sports Hall of Fame, in the American football category with the Class of 2018.

== College career ==
Bowen accepted a football scholarship from Hofstra University, where he was converted into a defensive end and became a three-year starter. As a freshman, he played in 5 games, making 3 tackles.

As a sophomore, he appeared in 12 games, recording 49 tackles (9.5 for loss), 3 sacks and one fumble recovery. He had 8 tackles against the University of Rhode Island.

As a junior, he started at right defensive end, registering 68 tackles (fourth on the team), 7.5 tackles for loss and 3 sacks. He had 9 tackles against the University of New Hampshire.

As a senior, he tallied 48 tackles (11 for loss), 5.5 sacks (second on the team), one interception and 2 passes defensed. He finished his career with 168 tackles, 11.5 sacks and one interception, which was returned for a 31-yard touchdown.

== Professional career ==
=== Dallas Cowboys ===
==== 2006–2010 ====
Bowen was signed as an undrafted free agent by the Dallas Cowboys after the 2006 NFL draft on May 1. He was released on September 2 and signed to the team's practice squad two days later. On November 8, he was promoted to the active roster. He appeared in the season-ending loss to the Detroit Lions and made his first career sack against Jon Kitna.

In 2007, Bowen served as a back-up to starting right defensive end Chris Canty, recording 9 quarterback pressures (tied for fourth on the team) and 23 tackles (5th among defensive linemen). In 2008, he played in 14 games (he was inactive twice), posting 28 tackles, 9 quarterback pressures.

In 2009, he appeared in all 16 games (2 starts) as the backup to Igor Olshansky and registered a then career-high 31 tackles, 3 sacks and 33 quarterback pressures (tied for third on the team).

In 2010, he appeared in all 16 games, starting 9 contests in place of an injured Marcus Spears, while finishing with 25 tackles (10 solo), 12 quarterback pressures (third on the team), 1.5 sacks and one pass defensed.

=== Washington Redskins ===
==== 2011 season ====
On July 28, the Washington Redskins signed Bowen to a five-year, $27.5 million contract. In his first season with the team, he was named the starting right defensive end in a 3–4 defense. On November 28, he was diagnosed with a third degree PCL tear, suffered against the Seattle Seahawks. He didn't need surgery and managed to start in all 16 games for the first time in his career

He set new career-highs with 41 tackles and six sacks. He received the team's Ed Block Courage Award not just for overcoming injury, but also for the passing of his son and his mother-in-law.

==== 2012 season ====
Bowen had arthroscopic surgery on his left knee in mid-April, to fix complications from his previous year knee injury. On November 14, he was made a co-defensive captain after a team vote during the Redskins' bye week. In the Week 14 win against the Cleveland Browns, he tore his upper left biceps and would still play for the rest of the regular season.

He would make an essential defensive move in the next week against the Philadelphia Eagles. During the Eagles last attempt to tie the game and with seconds remaining, Bowen put enough pressure on Nick Foles to make him throw the ball into the turf. Despite one second remaining on the clock, Foles would receive an intentional grounding penalty, ending the game and giving the Redskins the victory. He registered 51 tackles (31 solo), 32 quarterback pressures, 3 passes defensed and one sack.

==== 2013 season ====
In the Week 7 win against the Chicago Bears, Bowen suffered a tear in his right PCL. He continued to play through the injury until he further injured his right knee in a Week 11 loss to the Philadelphia Eagles. On November 26, the Redskins moved him to injured reserve due to needing a microfracture surgery to repair his torn PCL. He finished the season with 19 tackles (11 solo) and one pass defensed.

==== 2014 season ====
Having spent all of training camp on the PUP list, it was confirmed that he would remain there at the start of the 2014 season. He was placed on the active roster on October 18. He appeared in just 8 games (3 starts), while registering 11 tackles and no sacks. He was released on February 27, 2015,

=== New York Jets ===
On March 24, 2015, Bowen was signed as a free agent by the New York Jets, reuniting with Todd Bowles, who was a Dallas Cowboys assistant coach. He was a reserve player and appeared in 15 games with one start. He announced his retirement on June 1, 2016, signing a one-day contract with the Washington Redskins. He finished his professional career with 128 games (57 starts), 175 tackles (103 solo), 12.5 sacks and 9 passes defensed.

=== NFL statistics ===
Year	Team	GP	COMB	TOTAL	AST	SACK	FF	FR	FR YDS	INT	IR YDS	AVG IR	LNG IR	TD	PD
2006	DAL	1	1	1	0	1.0	0	0	0	0	0	0	0	0	0
2007	DAL	16	14	9	5	0.0	0	0	0	0	0	0	0	0	0
2008	DAL	14	17	6	11	0.0	0	0	0	0	0	0	0	0	0
2009	DAL	16	18	12	6	3.0	1	0	0	0	0	0	0	0	2
2010	DAL	16	22	16	6	1.5	0	0	0	0	0	0	0	0	1
2011	WSH	16	41	21	20	6.0	0	1	-1	0	0	0	0	0	1
2012	WSH	16	25	12	13	1.0	0	0	0	0	0	0	0	0	3
2013	WSH	10	19	11	8	0.0	0	0	0	0	0	0	0	0	1
2014	WSH	8	11	10	1	0.0	0	0	0	0	0	0	0	0	1
2015	NYJ	15	8	4	4	0.0	0	0	0	0	0	0	0	0	0
Career		128	176	102	74	12.5	1	1	0	0	0	0	0	0	9

== Personal life ==
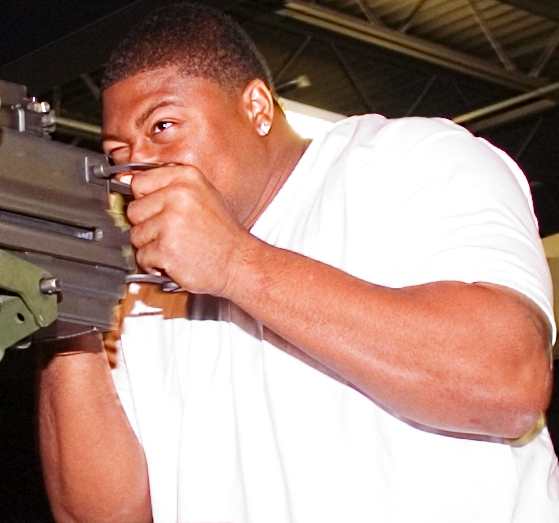
Bowen handling an Mk 19 grenade launcher at the Engagement Skills Trainer during his visit to Fort Bliss.

Bowen married his college girlfriend Tiffany Johnson, in March 2008 but divorced sometime later. The couple have 3 children-one daughter, Trinity, and twin boys, Stephen III and Skyler. Bowen's twin sons were born four months prematurely on June 28, 2011, the same day he signed with the Redskins. Unfortunately, Skyler died 10 days later. On December 8, 2011, Bowen won the Redskins’ Ed Block Courage Award in recognition of the inspiring way he dealt with Skyler's death.

He is best friends with former NFL defensive end Jason Hatcher. Both of them started their NFL careers with the Dallas Cowboys in 2006.
