= Marc Colombo =

American football player and coach (born 1978)

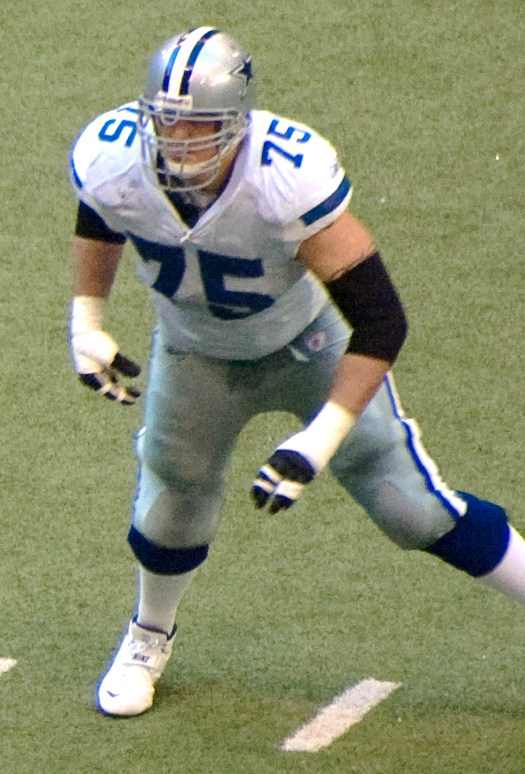
- Colombo with the Dallas Cowboys in 2007

Orlando Storm
- Title: Offensive coordinator

Personal information
- Born: October 8, 1978 (age 48); Bridgewater, Massachusetts, U.S.
- Listed height: 6 ft 8 in (2.03 m)
- Listed weight: 320 lb (145 kg)

Career information
- Position: Offensive tackle (No. 75, 71)
- High school: Bridgewater-Raynham
- College: Boston College
- NFL draft: 2002: 1st round, 29th overall pick

Career history

Playing
- Chicago Bears (2002–2005); Dallas Cowboys (2005–2010); Miami Dolphins (2011)

Coaching
- Dallas Cowboys (2016–2018) Assistant offensive line coach; Dallas Cowboys (2018–2019) Offensive line coach; New York Giants (2020) Offensive line coach; St. Louis Battlehawks (2025) Offensive line coach; Orlando Storm (2026–present) Offensive coordinator

Awards and highlights
- All-Big East (2001)

Career NFL statistics
- Games played: 111
- Games started: 95
- Fumble recoveries: 4
- Stats at Pro Football Reference

Marc Edward Colombo (born October 8, 1978) is an American former professional football player who was an offensive tackle for 11 seasons in the National Football League (NFL). He is currently the Co-offensive coordinator and offensive line coach for the Orlando Storm of the United Football League (UFL). He played in the NFL for the Chicago Bears, Dallas Cowboys and Miami Dolphins. He played college football for the Boston College Eagles. After his playing career, he served as an offensive line coach for the Cowboys and Giants.

== Early life ==
Colombo was born in Bridgewater, Massachusetts and attended Bridgewater-Raynham Regional High School where he earned Boston Globe, Boston Herald, Brockton Enterprise and Taunton Gazette all-scholastic honors as a senior offensive tackle. He also earned All-Northeast honors from SuperPrep. He helped lead his team to two conference titles in four years (1993 and 1996), his team advanced to the Division 1 Super Bowl in 1996.

He recorded 75 tackles and five sacks as a senior. He also played basketball and baseball. He won the Brockton Enterprise and Taunton Gazette's all-scholastic basketball honors while helping lead his team to the conference title as a senior. He was also an honor roll student.

== College career ==
Colombo attended Boston College, where he graduated with a degree in Sociology from the College of Arts & Sciences. He also worked on an undergraduate major his senior year.

In 1997, as a freshman, Colombo redshirted so that he could adjust to college football. In 1998, as a redshirt freshman, he played in six games, including the final two. In 1999, as a red-shirt sophomore, he played in seven games, including Boston College's 62–28 loss to Colorado in the Insight.com Bowl.

In 2000, as a redshirt junior, he started all 11 games at right tackle. It was also his first year as a starter in college. He helped the offense rank third in the Big East in total offense with 414.9 yards per game (30th in the nation) and rushing offense at 201 yards per game (21st in the nation). For the season, the offensive line gave up just six sacks. He helped running back William Green to rush for 1,164 yards marking the third-straight season that Boston College had a 1,000-yard rusher.

In 2001, as a redshirt senior, he earned All-Big East honors playing at both offensive tackle positions as a senior as part of an offensive line that helped the offense record 4,361 yards, including over 1,000 rushing yards.

== Professional career ==
Pre-draft measurables
| Height | Weight | Arm length | Hand span | 40-yard dash | 10-yard split | 20-yard split | 20-yard shuttle | Three-cone drill | Vertical jump | Broad jump | Bench press |
|---|---|---|---|---|---|---|---|---|---|---|---|
| 6 ft 7 7/8 in (2.03 m) | 313 lb (142 kg) | 34 in (0.86 m) | 10 1/2 in (0.27 m) | 5.27 s | 1.83 s | 3.02 s | 4.60 s | 7.65 s | 29.5 in (0.75 m) | 8 ft 5 in (2.57 m) | 30 reps |
All values from NFL Combine

=== Chicago Bears (2002–2005) ===
Colombo was selected in the first round (29th overall) of the 2002 NFL draft by the Chicago Bears. He spent three injury-plagued seasons with the Bears before being released early in the 2005 season.

In 2002, as a rookie, Colombo was placed on injured reserve after suffering a dislocated patella and femoral nerve damage during a road game against the St. Louis Rams on November 18. He missed the entire 2003 season after being placed first on the Physically Unable to Perform (PUP) list on August 13, and then on injured reserve.

He also missed most of the 2004 season; he was finally activated from the Reserve/PUP list to the active roster on November 8, 2004. In 2005, he played in the Bears season opener; however, he was waived the next week, on September 13, 2005.

=== Dallas Cowboys (2005–2010) ===
Colombo was out of football until he signed with the Dallas Cowboys on November 1, 2005. He was then inactive for his first three games with Dallas. He then played on special teams in a road game against the New York Giants, against the Kansas City Chiefs, and on the road against the Washington Redskins and then against the Rams.

In 2006, he was named the starting right tackle after training camp and started every game in one of the Cowboys most productive and efficient offensive seasons in franchise history. The offense scored 425 points (26.6 points a game), the fourth most in the league. The team was second in the league in third down efficiency (48.8%), the franchise's highest rating in that category since 1980. The team also averaged 360.8 yards per game in total offense, the fifth-most in the league and the most for the Cowboys since their Super Bowl XXX winning season of 1995.

In 2007, Colombo started every game at right tackle for the second consecutive year. He played a key role in one of the most successful offensive seasons in club history while helping the team to a franchise record-tying 13 wins and the first NFC East title since 1998. The offense finished the season second in the league in scoring (first in the conference) with an average of 28.4 points per game. The 455 points scored marked the second-most in franchise history behind only the 1983 team (479 points). With an average of 365.7 yards per game the Cowboys were third in the league (second in the conference) in total offense. The team ranked fourth in the league (third in the conference) in passing with an average of 256.6 yards per game In rushing, the Cowboys were 17th in the league (seventh in the conference) with an average of 109.1 yards per game. The offense gained 478 total yards and scored six touchdowns, which tied for the fourth most in a season opener in franchise history against the Giants as Tony Romo threw for a season-high 336 yards. The offensive line blocked for a 100-yard rusher, Marion Barber, a 100-yard receiver, Terrell Owens and a 300-yard passer, (Tony) Romo in a road game against the Bears on September 23, for the first time since a road game against the Redskins on September 12, 1999.

On March 9, 2007, Colombo was re-signed by the Cowboys to a two-year contract worth US$7 million with a $4 million signing bonus.

On December 25, 2008, he finalized a contract extension worth $22 million, with $11.5 million guaranteed, through the 2012 season. On November 15, 2009, in a game against the Green Bay Packers, Colombo broke his left fibula after a defensive player rolled into his leg. The injury opened the door for Doug Free to start 7 games, while performing at a high level. Colombo made his return on January 3, 2010 in the playoff game against the Philadelphia Eagles which Dallas won 34–14 to advance to the second round to face the Minnesota Vikings which was a 34–3 loss.

On July 28, 2011, after five seasons in Dallas, he was released as part of a youth movement on the offensive line.

=== Miami Dolphins (2011) ===
On July 31, 2011, Colombo was signed as free agent by the Miami Dolphins, reuniting with former Cowboys offensive Line Coach Tony Sparano, who was the team's head coach. He became the starting right tackle when Vernon Carey was moved to right guard. He wasn't re-signed after the season.

=== Retirement ===
On April 20, 2012, Colombo returned to Dallas to retire as a member of the Dallas Cowboys.

== Coaching career ==
Prior to the 2016 season, the Dallas Cowboys hired Colombo as an assistant offensive line coach. On October 29, 2018, the Cowboys released offensive line coach Paul Alexander and promoted Colombo to that position. He would continue in that position for the 2019 season. On January 8, 2020, it was reported that Colombo would not return to the team's coaching staff following the firing of head coach Jason Garrett and subsequent hiring of Mike McCarthy. He then followed Garrett to the New York Giants to coach the offensive line under Joe Judge. Colombo was fired by the Giants on November 18, 2020.

== Personal life ==
=== Music career ===
Marc Colombo
- Born: Marc Edward Colombo; October 8, 1978 (age 48); Bridgewater, Massachusetts
- Origin: Irving, Texas
- Genre: Heavy metal
- Occupation: Musician
- Instruments: Rhythm guitar Vocals
- Years active: 2002–present
- Label: Riot
- Website: MySpace.com/Colombom

Growing up, Colombo had a love for rock music, which led him to begin playing guitar when he was about 22 years old. He credits James Hetfield, the lead singer of Rock 'n Roll Hall of Fame band Metallica, as his primary influence. He attended his first Metallica concert at 13 years old. And as of 2007, he has attended 16 Metallica concerts. Some of his favorite bands are Megadeth, Pantera, and Slayer. He joined his first band in 2002, called "Blackmuff". Then during his tenure in Chicago, he played with another metal band called Mercs. Mercs played many shows throughout Chicago, at popular nightclubs such as Double Door and Bottom Lounge. He currently is the lead singer and plays rhythm guitar in a metal band called "Free Reign", along with former San Francisco 49ers guard Leonard Davis and Miami Dolphins guard Cory Procter. With the help of manager John Gomez (Silver Tongue Management), the band signed a recording contract with the Australian company Riot Entertainment on June 23, 2009.

=== Family ===
Colombo is the son of Gayle and Edward Colombo, he has a younger brother named Matthew, who appeared on The Bachelorette with Ashley Hebert. He is also a cousin of Steven Marciano, a former Boston College football player. He is married to Jessica, and he has two children, a daughter named Olivia, who was born in January 2008, and a son named Jack, born in 2012. He is now a part-owner of "Smashburger", a chain restaurant located mostly in the Dallas/Fort Worth, Texas area.

=== Community activities/charity work ===
As a teenager, Colombo was involved in community service activities at St. Basil's Church and at Bridgewater State College. He participates in the annual Salvation Army Angel Tree Christmas Program. He competed in the 2008 Poker for Pets for Society for the Prevention of Cruelty to Animals of Texas. He made annual team holiday hospital visits. He also contributed to the annual team Kick Off Luncheon and Cowboys Cookbook benefiting Happy Hill Farm. His wife Jessica participated in the Cowboys Wives Christmas Party for The Family Place.

== See also ==
- List of Chicago Bears players
- List of Dallas Cowboys players
