= Bridgewater-Raynham Regional High School =

Location
- 415 Center Street; Bridgewater, Massachusetts 02324; United States
- Coordinates: 41°59′21″N 70°59′12″W

Information
- Type: Public; Open enrollment
- Founded: 1961 (old building); 2007 (current building)
- Principal: Angela Watson
- Teaching staff: 91.25 (FTE)
- Grades: 9–12
- Enrollment: 1,408 (2023–2024)
- Student to teacher ratio: 15.43
- Colors: Red & White
- Mascot: Trojan
- Yearbook: Unitas (until 2012)
- Communities served: Bridgewater, Raynham
- Website: https://brrhs.bridge-rayn.org/en-US

Bridgewater Raynham Regional High School, founded in 1961, is a regional high school in Bridgewater, Massachusetts, shared by the City of Bridgewater and the Town of Raynham. The high school, commonly referred to as B-R, relocated to a new building at 415 Center Street in 2007. The athletic teams are called the Trojans and the school colors are red and white.

== Academics ==
=== MCAS ===
In spring 2019, 351 grade 10 students from the Bridgewater-Raynham Regional High School took the MCAS. Following are the percentages of students at each achievement level:

English Language Arts

- Exceeding Expectations: 13%
- Meeting Expectations: 60%
- Partially Meeting Expectations: 25%
- Not Meeting Expectations: 2%

Mathematics

- Exceeding Expectations: 19%
- Meeting Expectations: 53%
- Partially Meeting Expectations: 24%
- Not Meeting Expectations: 4%

=== SAT ===
In the 2017–18 school year, 431 students from Bridgewater-Raynham Regional High School took the SAT. Of these 431 test takers, the mean score for the Reading/Writing section of the test was 555 and the mean score for the Math section of the test was 561.

== Notable alumni ==
- Marc Colombo (born 1978), American football player
- Stephanie Cutter (born 1968), lawyer and political consultant
- Bruce Gray (born 1956), sculptor
- Jared C. Monti (1975–2006), United States Army Medal of Honor recipient
- Raymond F. Chandler (born 1962), military officer
- Steven Laffoley (born 1965), author and educator
