= Jason Hatcher =

American football player (born 1982)

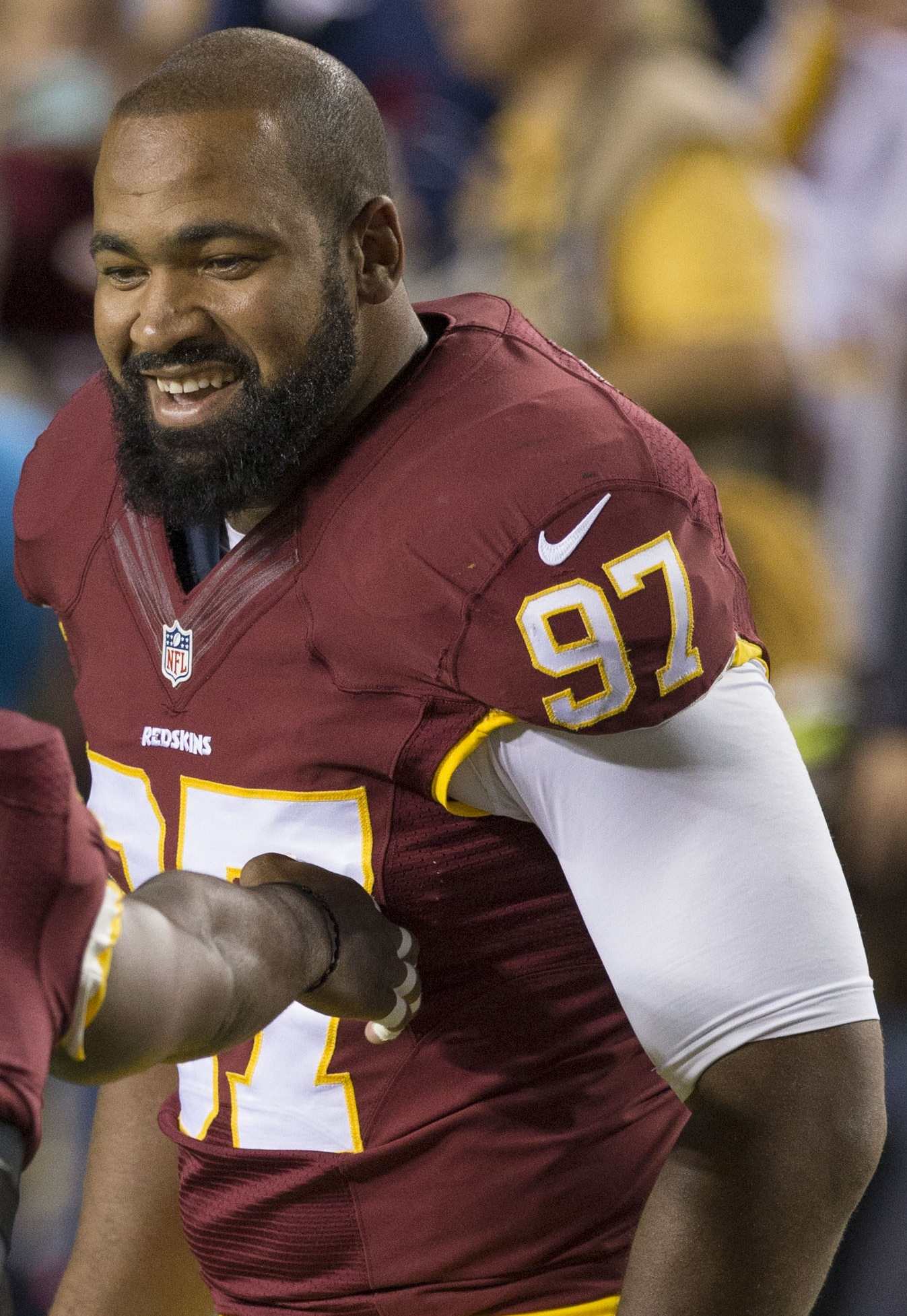
- Hatcher with the Washington Redskins in 2014

No. 97
- Position: Defensive end

Personal information
- Born: July 13, 1982 (age 44); Alexandria, Louisiana, U.S.
- Listed height: 6 ft 6 in (1.98 m)
- Listed weight: 299 lb (136 kg)

Career information
- High school: Jena (Jena, Louisiana)
- College: Grambling State
- NFL draft: 2006: 3rd round, 92nd overall pick

Career history
- Dallas Cowboys (2006–2013); Washington Redskins (2014–2015)

Awards and highlights
- Pro Bowl (2013)

Career NFL statistics
- Tackles: 254
- Sacks: 34.5
- Pass deflections: 9
- Interceptions: 1
- Forced fumbles: 5
- Stats at Pro Football Reference

Jason Dewayne Hatcher (born July 13, 1982) is an American former professional football player who was a defensive end in the National Football League (NFL). He played college football for the Grambling State Tigers. He was selected by the Dallas Cowboys in the third round of the 2006 NFL draft.

== Early life ==
Hatcher was born in Alexandria, Louisiana and was raised in Jena and attended Jena High School where he lettered in football and basketball. As a senior, he helped his team to a 10–3 record and earned All-State honors after catching 28 passes for 1,028 yards as a wide receiver and tight end.

== College career ==
Hatcher attended Grambling State University where he majored in physical education. As a true freshman, he was ruled academically ineligible because he didn't meet the NCAA requirements. In 2002, he was granted a medical redshirt after rupturing his right ACL.

In 2003 as a sophomore, Hatcher started at tight end and caught one pass for 14 yards and a two-point conversion before being gradually converted to defensive end midway through the season. After the switch he earned a starting position, recorded 13 tackles, three sacks and one pass broken up. In 2004, as a junior, he played his first full season at defensive end and finishing with 33 tackles, 10 for losses and five sacks.

As a senior, Hatcher helped his team win the conference title with an undefeated record (9–0) and a co-Black college football national championship (11–1 overall), while having an outstanding year of his own, recording 65 tackles and 10 sacks, and being named an all-Southwestern Athletic Conference selection. He finished his college career with 111 tackles, 31.5 for losses and 18.5 sacks.

== Professional career ==
Pre-draft measurables
Height	Weight	Arm length	Hand span	40-yard dash	10-yard split	20-yard split	20-yard shuttle	Three-cone drill	Vertical jump	Broad jump	Bench press
6 ft 5 7/8 in (1.98 m)	284 lb (129 kg)	32 3/4 in (0.83 m)	10 3/8 in (0.26 m)	4.83 s	1.72 s	2.88 s	4.49 s	7.67 s	35.5 in (0.90 m)	9 ft 5 in (2.87 m)	28 reps
All values from NFL Combine

=== Dallas Cowboys ===
Hatcher was selected in the third round (92nd overall) of the 2006 NFL draft by the Dallas Cowboys. His selection at the time was questioned because of his lack of production in college, but the team was high on his athletic ability and potential for their 3–4 defense.

As a rookie, Hatcher played in 14 games, missing two with a sprained ankle. For the season, he recorded 13 tackles, one for a loss and 2.5 sacks. In 2007, he played in all 16 games and recorded 35 tackles, three for losses and two sacks, while forcing one fumble. In 2008, Hatcher recorded 36 tackles, one for a loss, one pass broken up and one sack. In 2009, he played in all 16 games and recorded 29 tackles, one sack and one pass breakup.

For the most part of his career with the Cowboys, Hatcher was a reserve player (his first start was in 2010) and seen as a disappointment, until he re-signed with the team in 2011 after not receiving much interest in the free agent market. That season with the arrival of defensive coordinator Rob Ryan, he established himself as one of the team starters at defensive end, ahead of Marcus Spears and improved his overall play, compiling a career high in tackles (36) and sacks (4.5).

The next year, Hatcher was the Cowboys best defensive lineman and the only one to start all 16 games, on a defense decimated by injuries. He registered 4 sacks and career-highs with 51 tackles and 29 quarterback pressures (second in the NFL among interior linemen).

In 2013, Hatcher was set to play at the one-technique left defensive tackle position in the team's new 4–3 defense, but Jay Ratliff allegedly never recovered from his injuries and later forced his release from the team. He would end up starting 15 games as the three-technique right defensive tackle and showing a dominant play, while finishing a career-year with 48 tackles (7 for loss), 11 sacks (most by a Cowboys’ defensive tackle since Randy White 12.5 in 1984), 33 quarterback pressures and being named to the Pro Bowl as a replacement for an injured Haloti Ngata.

=== Washington Redskins ===
After eight seasons with the Cowboys, Hatcher signed a four-year, $27.5 million contract on March 14, 2014, to play defensive end in the Redskins’ 3-4 defense. In training camp he underwent arthroscopic surgery on his left knee and missed two weeks. He would also injure his right knee during the regular season and after being inactive in weeks 15 through 16, he was placed on the injured reserve list on December 27. He finished with 25 tackles, 5.5 sacks, and 26 quarterback pressures.

In 2015, he had knee issues that limited his practice time. He appeared in 15 games (14 starts), registering 20 tackles, 2 sacks, one pass defensed and one forced fumble. He was released on March 7, 2016.

He announced his retirement on April 15, 2016.

== NFL career statistics ==
Legend
	Led the league
**Bold**	Career high

=== Regular season ===
Year	Team	Games		Tackles					Interceptions					Fumbles			
Year	Team	GP	GS	Cmb	Solo	Ast	Sck	TFL	Int	Yds	TD	Lng	PD	FF	FR	Yds	TD
2006	DAL	14	0	19	14	5	2.5	4	0	0	0	0	0	0	0	0	0
2007	DAL	**16**	0	27	22	5	2.0	4	0	0	0	0	0	1	**1**	**29**	**1**
2008	DAL	**16**	0	17	11	6	1.0	2	0	0	0	0	0	0	0	0	0
2009	DAL	**16**	0	13	9	4	1.0	1	0	0	0	0	1	0	**1**	0	0
2010	DAL	13	1	13	9	4	1.0	2	0	0	0	0	0	0	**1**	0	0
2011	DAL	13	10	28	20	8	4.5	5	**1**	**16**	0	**16**	2	1	0	0	0
2012	DAL	**16**	**16**	**51**	27	**24**	4.0	5	0	0	0	0	1	0	**1**	0	**1**
2013	DAL	15	15	41	**34**	7	**11.0**	**15**	0	0	0	0	**3**	**2**	0	0	0
2014	WAS	13	13	25	15	10	5.5	8	0	0	0	0	1	0	**1**	0	0
2015	WAS	15	14	20	16	4	2.0	5	0	0	0	0	1	1	0	0	0
Career		147	69	254	177	77	34.5	51	1	16	0	16	9	5	5	29	2

=== Playoffs ===
Year	Team	Games		Tackles					Interceptions					Fumbles			
Year	Team	GP	GS	Cmb	Solo	Ast	Sck	TFL	Int	Yds	TD	Lng	PD	FF	FR	Yds	TD
2006	DAL	1	0	0	0	0	0.0	0	0	0	0	0	0	0	0	0	0
2007	DAL	1	0	**2**	1	**1**	0.0	0	0	0	0	0	0	0	0	0	0
2009	DAL	**2**	0	1	1	0	0.0	**1**	0	0	0	0	0	0	0	0	0
2015	WAS	1	**1**	**2**	**2**	0	0.0	0	0	0	0	0	0	0	0	0	0
Career		5	1	5	4	1	0.0	1	0	0	0	0	0	0	0	0	0

== Personal life ==
Hatcher and his wife Natasha have three sons, DiCarlos Jason Jr., Boston Kash, and two daughters, Tamia, and Journee Jane. His nephew, Jeffery Simmons, a defensive end and first-round selection for the Tennessee Titans, credits Hatcher with being his mentor. Hatcher is best friends with fellow defensive end, Stephen Bowen.
