= Junior Siavii =

American football player (1978–2022)

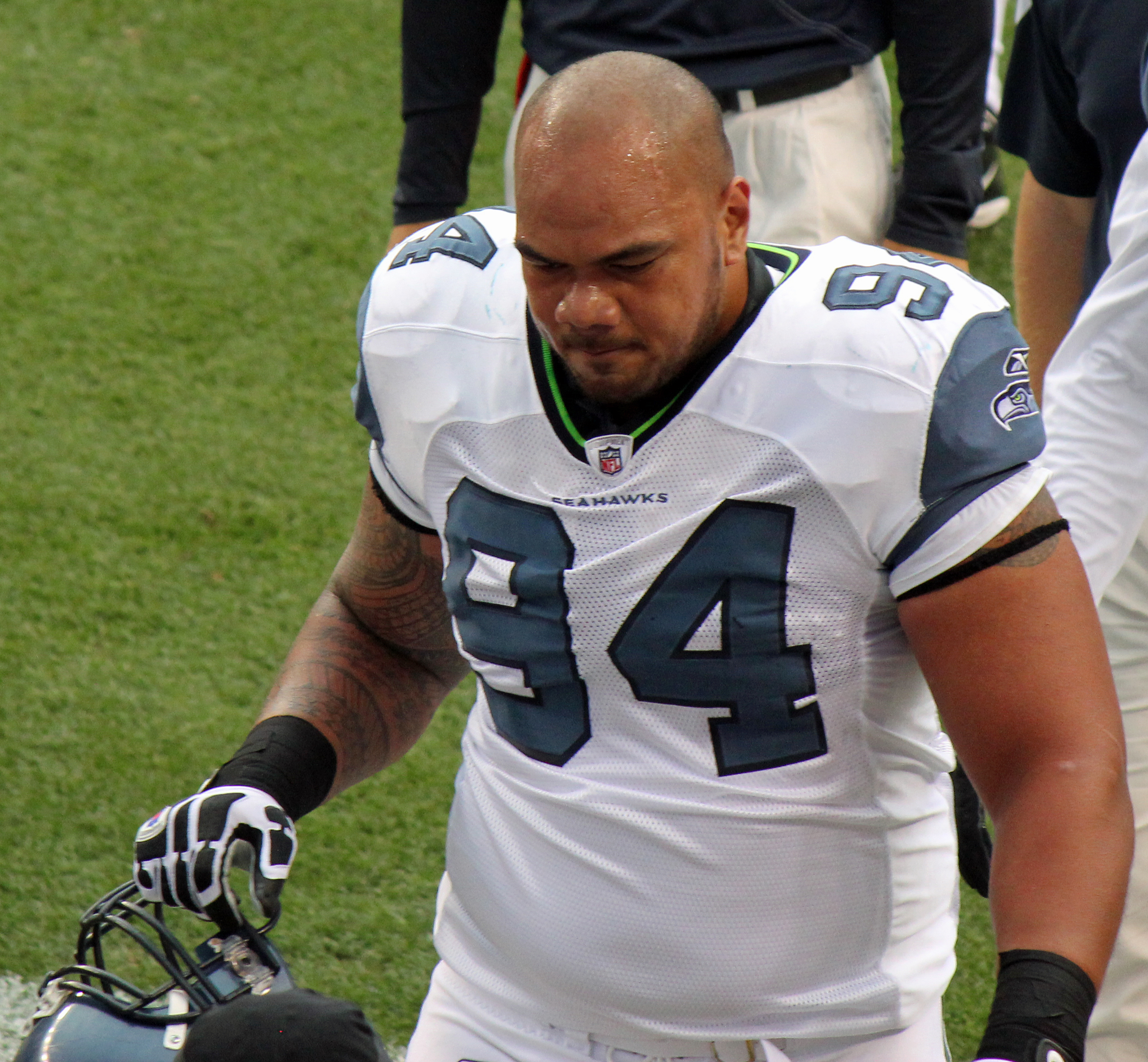
- Siavii in the 2011 NFL preseason

No. 94, 78, 95
- Position: Defensive tackle

Personal information
- Born: November 14, 1978; Pago Pago, American Samoa
- Died: January 13, 2022 (aged 43); Leavenworth, Kansas, U.S.
- Listed height: 6 ft 5 in (1.96 m)
- Listed weight: 320 lb (145 kg)

Career information
- High school: Tafuna (American Samoa)
- College: Oregon
- NFL draft: 2004: 2nd round, 36th overall pick

Career history
- Kansas City Chiefs (2004–2005); Dallas Cowboys (2008–2009); Seattle Seahawks (2010)

Career NFL statistics
- Total tackles: 56
- Sacks: 1
- Fumble recoveries: 1
- Stats at Pro Football Reference

Saousoalii Poe Siavii Jr. (/ˈsiːæviː/ SEE-a-VEE; November 14, 1978 – January 13, 2022) was a Samoan-born professional American football defensive tackle in the National Football League (NFL) for the Kansas City Chiefs, Dallas Cowboys, and Seattle Seahawks. He played college football at the University of Oregon.

== Early life ==
Siavii attended Tafuna High School. He played for one year at Dixie State Junior College, before leaving for Butte Community College. He played two seasons, receiving All-NorCal Conference honors in 2000. In 2001, he was declared ineligible and was forced to spend the year earning his degree, before transferring to the University of Oregon.

As a junior, he was mainly a reserve defensive tackle with only 2 starts, posting 15 tackles (2.5 for loss) and a half sack. As a senior, he was named a starter in a defensive line that included Igor Olshansky, registering 43 tackles and 2 sacks.

He finished his 2-year career with 58 tackles (8.5 for loss), 2.5 sacks, 3 pass deflections, and one fumble recovery.

== Professional career ==
=== Kansas City Chiefs ===
Siavii was selected by the Kansas City Chiefs in the second round (36th overall) of the 2004 NFL draft. He was expected to be a run stopper on the defensive line but struggled as a rookie. He collected 12 tackles (4 for loss), one sack and 3 quarterback pressures.

In 2005, his playing time was limited by a knee injury he suffered in training camp. He played in 14 games, recording 15 tackles and 3 quarterback pressures.

In 2006, repeated knee injuries kept Siavii on the physically unable to perform list before he was waived on September 2, 2006. He eventually needed microfracture surgery on his right knee.

=== Dallas Cowboys ===
After being out of football for two years, he was signed as a free agent by the Dallas Cowboys on January 23, 2008. He was released on August 31.

On January 12, 2009, he was re-signed. He played in 16 games registering 11 tackles.

On April 8, 2010, he was re-signed by the team. He was cut on September 4, 2010.

=== Seattle Seahawks ===
On September 5, 2010, he was claimed off waivers by the Seattle Seahawks. He played in 14 games (6 starts), while setting a career-high in tackles (30), before being placed on the injured reserve list with a bruised spinal cord injury on December 23. He was released on September 4, 2011.

== Legal trouble and death ==
On August 19, 2005, he was arrested for misdemeanor assault for his role in a bar fight in Minnesota.

He was arrested on August 26, 2019, for charges related to illegal firearms in Kansas City, Missouri. He was indicted by the United States Attorney for the Western District of Missouri on additional conspiracy and drug-trafficking charges; this supersedes his original indictment on November 15, 2019. On July 31, 2020, he was arrested on charges of second-degree burglary and a misdemeanor stealing charge.

While awaiting trial at United States Penitentiary, Leavenworth, on January 13, 2022, Siavii was found unresponsive in his cell. He was taken to the hospital where he was pronounced dead at the age of 43.
