= Marcus Spears (defensive end) =

American football player (born 1983)

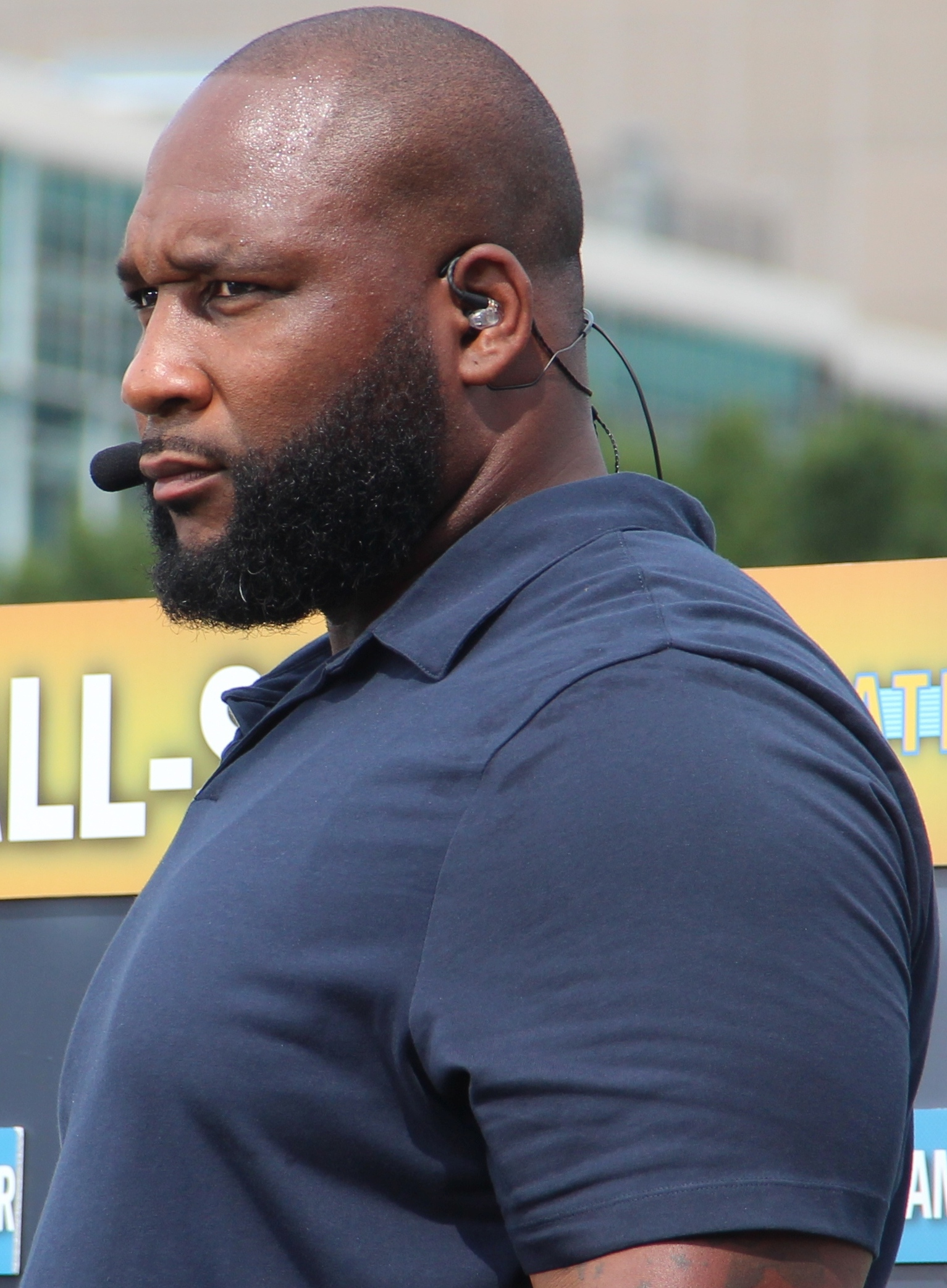
- Spears in 2018

No. 96, 98
- Position: Defensive end

Personal information
- Born: March 8, 1983 (age 43); Baton Rouge, Louisiana, U.S.
- Listed height: 6 ft 4 in (1.93 m)
- Listed weight: 315 lb (143 kg)

Career information
- High school: Southern University Laboratory School (Baton Rouge)
- College: LSU (2001–2004)
- NFL draft: 2005: 1st round, 20th overall pick

Career history
- Dallas Cowboys (2005–2012); Baltimore Ravens (2013)

Awards and highlights
- PFWA All-Rookie Team (2005); BCS national champion (2003); Consensus All-American (2004); 2× First-team All-SEC (2003, 2004)

Career NFL statistics
- Total tackles: 236
- Sacks: 10
- Forced fumbles: 3
- Fumble recoveries: 1
- Stats at Pro Football Reference

Marcus Rayshon Spears (born March 8, 1983), nicknamed "Swagu", is an American former professional football player and analyst who was a defensive end for nine seasons in the National Football League (NFL), primarily for the Dallas Cowboys. He played college football for the LSU Tigers, winning a national championship in 2003 and earning consensus All-American honors in 2004. Spears was selected by the Cowboys in the first round of the 2005 NFL draft. He also played in the NFL for the Baltimore Ravens.

== Early life ==
Spears was born in Baton Rouge, Louisiana. He was a highly sought after two-sport athlete in the country following his senior season at Southern University Laboratory School in Baton Rouge. On the high school football field, he was rated as the No. 1 tight end prospect in America and the third-best overall prospect after earning high school All-America honors. He was named first-team Class 1A all-state selection on both offense and defense following his senior season, becoming the first player to be honored on both in Louisiana since 1991. He finished his final prep season with 28 receptions for 435 yards and three touchdowns and 245 rushing yards and six touchdowns on offense and 22 tackles for losses, 11.5 quarterback sacks and four fumble recoveries on defense. Spears was also one of the nation's top basketball prospects. He was named Gatorade Basketball Player of the Year for Louisiana following his senior season. He played in the first ever U.S. Army All-American Bowl game on December 30, 2000.

== College career ==
Spears attended Louisiana State University, where he played for coach Nick Saban's LSU Tigers football team from 2001 to 2004. He was initially recruited by LSU as a tight end but was soon moved to the defensive line. Spears played tight end, fullback and defensive end as a freshman in 2001, recording two catches for 20 yards on offense and eight tackles, a sack and a tackle for loss on defense. His play earned him freshman All-Southeastern Conference (SEC) honors as a tight end.

The 2002 season marked his first as a full-time defensive player, in which he recorded 46 tackles, 16 quarterback pressures, 3.5 tackles for losses and three sacks. In 2003, during LSU's national championship season, Spears contributed 49 tackles, 23 quarterback pressures, 13 tackles for losses, six sacks and six passes defensed to earn First-team All-SEC honors. Playing against the Oklahoma Sooners for the national championship in the Sugar Bowl, Spears returned an interception 20 yards for a touchdown to give the Tigers a 21–7 advantage in their 21–14 victory.

During his 2004 senior season, Spears put together a career year, earning first-team All-America honors from the Walter Camp Foundation, American Football Coaches Association, and AP, and second-team All-America honors from Sports Illustrated, first-team All-SEC honors, and was a semifinalist for the Bednarik Award and Lombardi Award. He finished the year tying his career-high in tackles (49) while setting career-highs for tackles for losses (17) and sacks (nine, a figure that ranks fourth in the LSU single-season records). He also recorded 21 quarterback pressures to help the Tigers finish the year third in the country in total defense.

In April 2021, Spears was inducted into the Louisiana High School Athletic Association Hall of Fame.

== Professional career ==
Pre-draft measurables
Height	Weight	Arm length	Hand span	40-yard dash	20-yard shuttle	Three-cone drill	Vertical jump	Bench press
6 ft 4 in (1.93 m)	307 lb (139 kg)	33 in (0.84 m)	10 1/2 in (0.27 m)	5.05 s	4.44 s	7.21 s	31.0 in (0.79 m)	15 reps
All values from NFL Combine/Pro Day

=== Dallas Cowboys ===
The Dallas Cowboys entered the 2005 NFL draft with two first round draft choices. Spears was considered by head coach Bill Parcells to be the key to the team's eventual move to a 3–4 defense and wanted to take him with the first selection (11th overall pick). However, owner/GM Jerry Jones overruled Parcells and drafted DeMarcus Ware instead, who the team thought would not be available later in the draft. Spears was eventually selected by the Cowboys with the 20th overall pick.

==== 2005 ====
Spears suffered from injury problems in his first two training camps. In his first training camp in 2005 as a rookie, he sprained his right knee and ankle while straining his calf. He missed the first three preseason games but bounced back in time for the final preseason game and recorded three tackles and a sack.

He started the season as a backup in the team's 4-3 defense but moved into a right defensive end starting role midway through the season, to earn All-Rookie honors from Pro Football Weekly. His 35 tackles were 12th on the team – third among linemen and rookies, while his six quarterback pressures were fourth. He also added 1.5 sacks and a pass defended.

In his NFL debut at the San Diego Chargers, Spears was in the defensive line rotation but did not record a tackle. He recorded his first sack – one he split with Greg Ellis – and his first career tackle against the Washington Redskins. Spears then led all defensive linemen with four tackles at the San Francisco 49ers. He helped limit the Philadelphia Eagles to 129 yards, including just 19 rushing, the fourth lowest in franchise history. Spears earned his first NFL start at defensive end at the Seattle Seahawks and responded with three tackles and a batted pass while helping limit Shaun Alexander, the NFL's leading rusher to 21 carries for 61 yards (2.9 avg.). He officially moved into the starting lineup full-time against the Arizona Cardinals and led all linemen with four tackles. Spears logged his third career start in Philadelphia and posted a season-high seven tackles to lead all linemen and finish second on the team. He had a three-tackle game at the New York Giants. Against the Kansas City Chiefs, Spears recorded four and a fumble recovery. With 1:16 remaining in the first half and Dallas trailing 14–10, Spears scooped up a Trent Green fumble at the Cowboys 15-yard line and returned it 59 yards to the Chiefs 26-yard line. It was the eighth-longest return in franchise history and the longest ever by a Dallas rookie. Three plays later, Drew Bledsoe completed a pass to Jason Witten for a touchdown and a 17–14 halftime lead. In Washington, Spears recorded three tackles. In the season finale against the St. Louis Rams, he recorded two tackles and his first solo sack of the season.

==== 2006 ====
Before the 2006 season, Spears underwent minor knee surgery to repair meniscus damage, which forced him to miss the first two weeks of training camp. The Cowboys moved to a 3-4 defense and Spears earned the starting role at left defensive end, finishing ninth with 48 tackles (31 solo), one sack, three pass deflections, two tackles for loss and tied for fifth on the squad with three quarterback pressures.

In the season opener at the Jacksonville Jaguars, Spears had two tackles and a tackle for loss. In Week two's Sunday night game against the Redskins, Spears recorded his only sack of the season, sacking quarterback Mark Brunell in the first quarter, he also recorded two tackles. After the Cowboys' bye week, Spears led all defensive linemen with four tackles against the Tennessee Titans. The Titans, in rookie quarterback Vince Young first career start, only rushed 27 times for 78 yards. Spears recorded two tackles the next week in Philadelphia, where he also broke up a pass at the line of scrimmage. Against the Houston Texans, Spears recorded three tackles and a quarterback pressure. He recorded three tackles against the Giants in a Monday night loss at Texas Stadium. At the Carolina Panthers, in a Sunday night victory, Spears had two more tackles and a quarterback pressure. He had five tackles the following week in Washington, followed by four tackles in Arizona. Against the eventual Super Bowl champion Indianapolis Colts, Spears had three tackles and one for loss, limiting the Colts to a season-low 14 points. In the annual Thanksgiving Day game against the Tampa Bay Buccaneers, he had three tackles. He had two tackles in the Cowboys' 23–20 win over the Giants at the Meadowlands. The following week Spears recorded a season-high six tackles against the Saints in a home loss. He recorded four tackles in a road win against the Atlanta Falcons, helping provide pressure on the defensive line that sacked Falcons quarterback Michael Vick four times. Spears had three tackles in the Cowboys' Christmas Day loss to the Eagles and did not record a stat in the season finale against the Detroit Lions. In his postseason debut, Spears had one tackle and led the team with two quarterback pressures against the Seahawks.

==== 2007 ====
In 2007, he appeared in all 16 regular season games and Dallas' lone post season game. For the season Spears recorded 32 tackles (19 solo), two forced fumbles, and a career-high two sacks and three passed defensed on the season.

In the season opener against the New York Giants, Spears recorded one tackle (one solo). During week two at the Miami Dolphins, he recorded two tackles (two solo). In the week three victory over the Chicago Bears, Spears recorded two tackles (one solo). During the week four victory over the St. Louis Rams, he recorded two tackles (one solo), and 0.5 sack. In week five at the Buffalo Bills, Spears recorded two tackles (one solo). During the Cowboys first loss of the season, to the New England Patriots, he recorded four tackles. In the week seven win over the Minnesota Vikings, Spears did not record any stats. During week nine at the Philadelphia Eagles, he recorded one tackle and 0.5 sacks and a forced fumble. In the week 10 win over the New York Giants, Spears recorded two tackles (two solo). During the week 11 win over the Washington Redskins, he recorded one tackle. In the week 12 victory over the New York Jets, Spears recorded two tackles and one pass defensed. During the week 13 victory over the Green Bay Packers, he recorded one tackle, and a pass defensed. In the week 14 win over the Detroit Lions, Spears recorded one tackle. During a week 15 loss to the Eagles, he recorded three tackles (two solo). In a week 16 victory over the Carolina Panthers, Spears recorded one tackle and one pass defensed. During the season finale against the Washington Redskins, he recorded a season high five tackles (four solo), one sack, and one forced fumble.

In the Cowboys lone playoff game against eventual Super Bowl XLII champion New York Giants, Spears recorded two tackles.

==== 2008 ====
Marcus Spears started 15 games of the 16 games he played in the 2008 season. He registered 35 tackles (with 23 being solo, and 12 being assisted tackles), a sack, and a forced fumble.

==== 2009 ====
In 2009, he started 14 games and recorded 50 tackles (2 for losses), a career-high 2.5 sacks and a career-high tying 16 quarterback pressures and 2 pass breakups.

Spears registered a tackle and three pressures in the wildcard playoff win against the Philadelphia Eagles, with the defense not allowing a rushing first down for the first time in postseason team history. He had a postseason career-high six tackles and a pressure in the divisional game against the Minnesota Vikings.

==== 2010 ====
After playing in only eight games (7 starts), his streak of 88 consecutive games played ended on November 10, when he was placed on the injured reserve list, with a left calf injury. Playing mostly in running downs, he registered 24 tackles (1 for loss) and 3 quarterback pressures.

==== 2011 ====
Spears signed a 5-year, $19.2 million contract during the off-season. He injured his groin in the second preseason game and missed the rest of the preseason.

New defensive coordinator Rob Ryan selected Kenyon Coleman and Jason Hatcher as the starters at defensive end, relegating Spears into a reserve role for the first time in his career. He was used mostly on running downs and registered 29 tackles (one for loss), 15th on the team and fifth among defensive linemen, one sack, two pass deflections and one quarterback pressure.

==== 2012 ====
In 2012, he again had a reserve role, but got a chance to start in six games because of injuries. Spears finished the season with 35 tackles (2 for loss) and 1 sack. He missed one game with a knee injury.

On March 13, 2013, Spears was released.

=== Baltimore Ravens ===
On March 15, 2013, Spears signed a two-year, $3.55 million deal with the Baltimore Ravens. On October 30, 2013, he was waived after registering 10 tackles as a reserve defensive end.

== NFL career statistics ==
Legend
**Bold**	Career high
Underline	Incomplete data

=== Regular season ===
Year	Team	Games		Tackles						PD	Fumbles				
Year	Team	GP	GS	Comb	Solo	Ast	TFL	QBH	Sck	PD	FF	FR	Yds	Y/F	TD
2005	DAL	16	10	31	19	12	1	—	1.5	1	0	**1**	**59**	**59.0**	0
2006	DAL	16	16	**45**	**29**	16	3	3	1.0	**3**	0	0	0	—	0
2007	DAL	16	16	30	19	11	**5**	3	2.0	**3**	**2**	0	0	—	0
2008	DAL	16	15	35	23	12	**5**	**6**	1.0	2	1	0	0	—	0
2009	DAL	16	14	25	17	8	4	**6**	**2.5**	1	0	0	0	—	0
2010	DAL	8	7	19	11	8	1	1	0.0	0	0	0	0	—	0
2011	DAL	16	15	16	13	3	2	3	1.0	2	0	0	0	—	0
2012	DAL	15	6	25	7	**18**	2	1	1.0	1	0	0	0	—	0
2013	BAL	5	1	10	5	5	2	0	0.0	0	0	0	0	—	0
Career		124	90	236	143	93	25	23	10.0	13	3	1	59	59.0	0

=== Postseason ===
Year	Team	Games		Tackles					
Year	Team	GP	GS	Comb	Solo	Ast	TFL	QBH	Sck
2006	DAL	1	1	2	1	1	0	0	0.0
2007	DAL	1	1	2	0	**2**	0	0	0.0
2009	DAL	2	2	**3**	**2**	1	0	**1**	0.0
Career		4	4	7	3	4	0	1	0.0

== Charitable work ==
Spears was actively involved in community service projects during his time at LSU. As a rookie, Spears was a member of the Cowboys 2005 Rookie Club, a program designed to introduce rookie team members to community service in the Dallas area which included work with The Salvation Army, Children's Medical Center Dallas and Meals on Wheels. In the spring, Spears was a co-chair, along with teammate DeMarcus Ware, for the second annual Taste of the NFL: The Ultimate Dallas Cowboys Tailgate Party at Abacus restaurant that benefited The North Texas Food Bank. The event raised enough money to provide 330,000 meals to North Texans in need.

== Personal life ==
Spears and his wife, retired WNBA player Aiysha Smith, have three children: Cari (born 2007), Marcus Jr. (born 2009), and Miko (born 2013). Cari was ranked the top volleyball recruit in the class of 2025 and plays in college for the Texas Longhorns, while Marcus Jr. was ranked one of the top basketball recruits in the class of 2027 and reclassified to the class of 2026 to play in college for the Texas Longhorns.

Marcus is a Christian who attends TD Jakes' church in Texas.

== TV career ==
In August 2014, Spears became a co-host of SEC Nation, the SEC/ESPN Network's flagship show. SEC Nation is a weekly college football preview show offering insight into upcoming national and SEC football games. He is a regular contributor to the Paul Finebaum Show, broadcast daily on the SEC Network. He is affectionately referred to as "The Big Swagu".

In 2015, Spears began hosting a TV show called DFW Outdoorsman The show covers hunting, fishing, and other similar activities in the North Texas area.

Beginning with the 2017 college football season, Spears began hosting Thinking Out Loud on the SEC Network with former Alabama quarterback Greg McElroy.

Spears now appears regularly on ESPN morning shows Get Up!, First Take, and its flagship NFL studio show, NFL Live. Spears does Monday Night Countdown before Monday Night Football.
