= Robert Brewster (American football) =

American football player (born 1986)

No. 79
- Position: Offensive tackle

Personal information
- Born: July 30, 1986 (age 40); Cincinnati, Ohio, U.S.
- Listed height: 6 ft 4 in (1.93 m)
- Listed weight: 325 lb (147 kg)

Career information
- High school: Wyoming (Wyoming, Ohio)
- College: Ball State
- NFL draft: 2009: 3rd round, 75th overall pick

Career history
- Dallas Cowboys (2009–2010); Kansas City Command (2012)

Awards and highlights
- 2× All-MAC (2007, 2008)

Career NFL statistics
- Games played: 1
- Stats at Pro Football Reference

Robert Brewster (born July 30, 1986) is an American former professional football player who was an offensive tackle for the Dallas Cowboys of the National Football League (NFL). He played college football for the Ball State Cardinals before being selected by the Cowboys in the third round of the 2009 NFL draft.

== Early life ==
Brewster attended Wyoming High School and lettered three times in football. As a senior, he received All-state, All-city, Cincinnati Hills League Offensive Player of the Year and "Tremendous 26" Division Ill Player of the Year honors. He also practiced basketball.

He accepted a football scholarship from Ball State University. As a true freshman, he started the first 4 games at right tackle, before being moved to right guard for the rest of the season. As a sophomore, he was named the regular starter at right tackle, allowing just 2 sacks and one quarterback pressure on 373 pass plays.

As a junior, he blocked for an offense that set school records in total offense (5,640 yards) and passing yards (3,704 yards). In 2008, he helped Ball State achieve 12 straight wins and a national ranking for the first time in school history. He was penalized just once and allowed only 2.5 sacks and one quarterback pressure on 405 pass plays. He was a four-year starter and received first-team All-Mid-American Conference accolades in 2007 and 2008.

== Professional career ==
=== Dallas Cowboys ===
Brewster was selected by the Dallas Cowboys in the third round (75th overall) of the 2009 NFL draft. As a rookie, he was placed on the injured reserve list after he tore a pectoral muscle during post-minicamp workouts.

On October 15, 2010, during a 1-7 start, the Cowboys decided to release him due to a lack of production and to make room for wide receiver Jesse Holley. After his release he was signed to the team's practice squad, before being released on July 27, 2011.

His problems were never helped by the fact that he followed a string of unsuccessful offensive lineman selections, made by the team in the first rounds of the draft: Al Johnson (2003), Jacob Rogers (2004), Stephen Peterman (2004) and James Marten (2007).

=== Kansas City Command ===
On December 30, 2011, Brewster signed with the Kansas City Command of the Arena Football League, reuniting with his Ball State teammates quarterback Nate Davis and receiver Darius Hill. In 2012, he suffered a season-ending knee injury in the sixth game against the San Jose SaberCats. He wasn't re-signed after the season.

== Personal life ==
On September 3, 2011, despite being out of football, the NFL suspended him 4 games after violating the league's policy on banned substances. Brewster still resides in Dallas, Texas with his family.

His son, Jalen, is a five-star football recruit in the class of 2027.
