= Cory Procter =

American football player (born 1982)

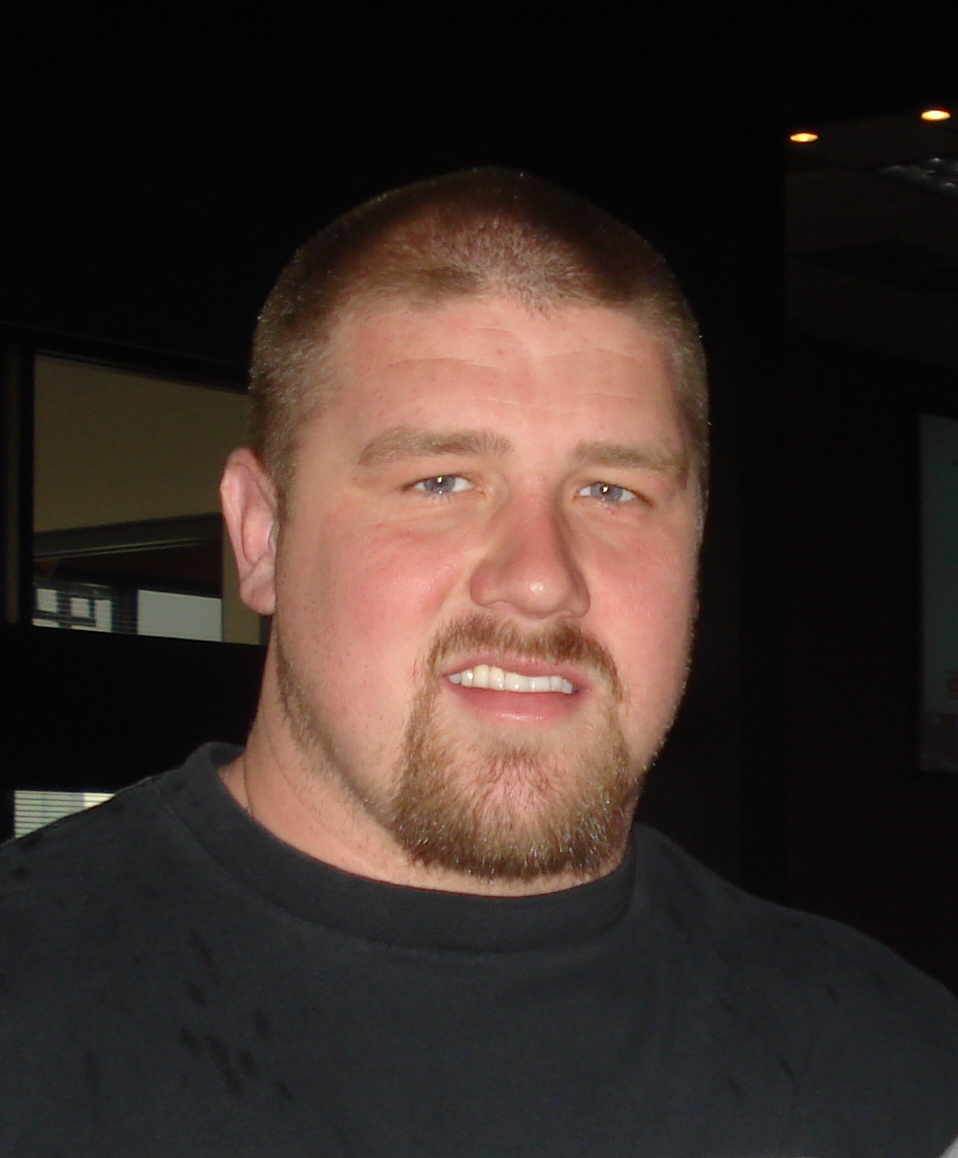
- Procter in 2009

No. 71
- Position: Guard / Center

Personal information
- Born: October 18, 1982 (age 44); Gig Harbor, Washington, U.S.
- Listed height: 6 ft 4 in (1.93 m)
- Listed weight: 308 lb (140 kg)

Career information
- High school: Gig Harbor
- College: Montana
- NFL draft: 2005: undrafted

Career history
- Detroit Lions (2005)*; Dallas Cowboys (2005–2009); Miami Dolphins (2010)
- * Offseason or practice squad member only

Awards and highlights
- Division I-AA All-American (2004); All-Big Sky (2004)

Career NFL statistics
- Games played: 54
- Games started: 14
- Stats at Pro Football Reference

Cory Procter (born October 18, 1982) is an American former professional football player who was a guard in the National Football League (NFL) for the Detroit Lions, Dallas Cowboys, and Miami Dolphins. He played college football for the Montana Grizzlies.

== Early life ==
Procter attended Gig Harbor High School and was a letterman in football and wrestling. In football, he was twice named the team MVP and as a senior, he earned All-League offensive lineman, All-Area, All-State, and All-Northwest honors. In wrestling, he was twice named the team MVP.

He accepted a football scholarship to play for the University of Montana, where he became a four-year starter with 42 consecutive starts (47 total). He started 5 games at right tackle as a freshman, because of injuries on the offensive line and contributed to the team winning the Division I-AA National Championship. As a sophomore, he was moved to left guard. As a junior and senior, he returned to play right tackle.

== Professional career ==
=== Detroit Lions ===
Procter was signed as an undrafted free agent by the Detroit Lions after the 2005 NFL draft on April 28. He was waived and later signed to the team's practice squad on September 4.

=== Dallas Cowboys ===
On November 30, 2005, he was signed by the Dallas Cowboys from the Detroit Lions' practice squad. He was activated for the last 2 games of the season, but he did not see any playing time.

In 2006, he was declared inactive in all of the games, while being a backup at guard and center. In 2007, he played in all 16 games as part of the special teams units and started 2 contests at center in place of Andre Gurode who had a knee injury.

In 2008, he started 11 games at left guard in place of an injured Kyle Kosier, but didn't fare well with the extended playing time, specially against power rushers. He was waived on May 16, 2010.

=== Miami Dolphins ===
On May 24, 2010, he was signed by the Miami Dolphins as a free agent, reuniting with former Cowboys head coach Bill Parcells, who was the team's Executive Vice President of Football Operations. He was released on September 5. On September 9, he was re-signed to replace center Jake Grove. On November 20, he was placed on the injured reserve list after rupturing the patellar tendon in his left knee during the tenth game against the Chicago Bears.

== Personal life ==
Procter was the drummer for the metal band Free Reign, a project also involving Cowboys linemen Marc Colombo and Leonard Davis. He has also appeared on the VH1 reality show Rock and Roll Fantasy Camp.

He currently owns and runs Pro Capital Wealth Management as well as speaks for different organizations.
