= Jason Williams (American football) =

American football player (born 1986)

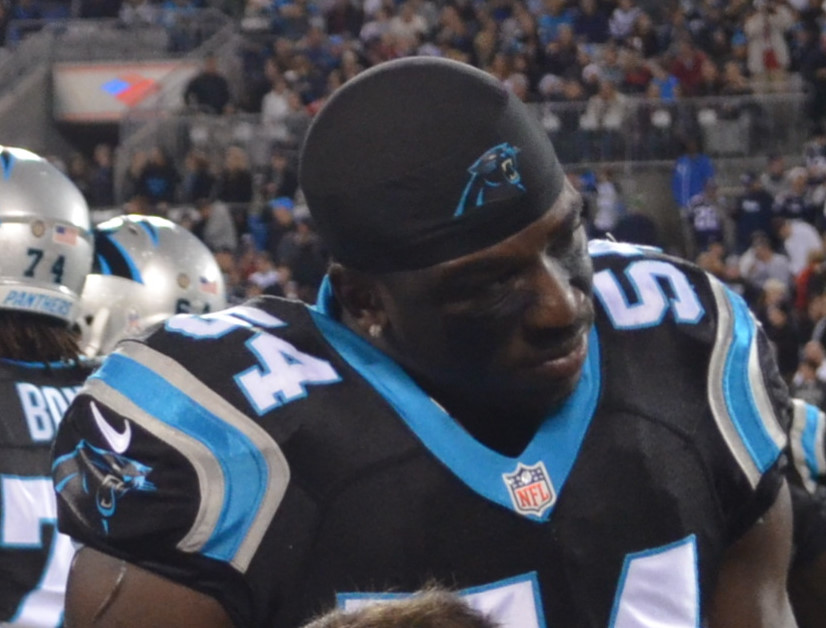
- Williams with the Carolina Panthers in 2013

No. 58, 54, 57, 52
- Position: Linebacker

Personal information
- Born: April 23, 1986 (age 40); Chicago, Illinois, U.S.
- Listed height: 6 ft 1 in (1.85 m)
- Listed weight: 245 lb (111 kg)

Career information
- High school: DuSable (Chicago)
- College: Western Illinois
- NFL draft: 2009: 3rd round, 69th overall pick

Career history
- Dallas Cowboys (2009–2010); Carolina Panthers (2010–2011); Philadelphia Eagles (2012); Carolina Panthers (2012–2014); Tampa Bay Buccaneers (2014)

Awards and highlights
- FCS All-American (2008); Second-team FCS All-American (2007); All-Gateway Conference (2007); All-MVC (2008)

Career NFL statistics
- Games played: 60
- Total tackles: 64
- Forced fumbles: 3
- Fumble recoveries: 1
- Stats at Pro Football Reference

Jason X. Williams (born April 23, 1986) is an American former professional football player who was a linebacker in the National Football League (NFL) for the Dallas Cowboys, Carolina Panthers, Philadelphia Eagles and Tampa Bay Buccaneers. He played college football at Western Illinois.

== Early life ==
Williams was born in Chicago, Illinois and attended DuSable High School. As a senior, he contributed to his team's undefeated record in the Chicago Public League’s Intra-City Central Conference.

He rushed for 2,988 yards, threw for 3,015 yards and recorded 71 total touchdowns (35 rushing and 36 passing) in his career. He was a two-time All-City and All-Section selection.

== College career ==
Williams accepted a football scholarship from Western Illinois University where he majored in exercise science. As a redshirt freshman in 2005, he played in 10 out of 11 games, making 23 tackles (14 solo), one tackle for loss and one blocked kick. He started the final two games of the season at strong safety.

As a sophomore in 2006, he started all 11 games at weakside linebacker. He recorded 92 tackles, three sacks, 10.5 tackles for loss (led the team), three forced fumbles, and one interception. He also earned honorable-mention All-Gateway Conference and earned the team’s Green Beret award for his significant contributions to the kicking game. He had 15 tackles against Illinois State.

As a junior in 2007, Williams recorded 107 tackles (third in the conference), eight sacks (led the conference), 16.5 tackles for loss (led the conference), five forced fumbles (led the conference), and six passes defended. The five forced fumbles tied a school and league record, while ranking fifth in the nation. He ranked among the nation's top 50 defensive players in tackles for loss, total tackles and sacks. He was a runner-up for the Gateway Defensive Player of the Year Award. He was named the team’s defensive MVP at the teams annual awards banquet.

As a senior in 2008, he started all 11 games at weakside linebacker, posting 67 tackles (39 solo), four sacks, 14.5 tackles-for-losses and led the nation with a school-record six forced fumbles. He had two sacks and two forced fumbles in a 24–28 loss against Arkansas. He finished fourth in the Buck Buchanan Award voting. He was also named to the Associated Press All-America First-team, the Sports Network All-America First-team and the College Sporting News All-America team. He became the first player in school history to earn repeated All-American honors, he was also named the team's Defensive MVP and played in the East-West Shrine Game.

Williams ended his college career by setting a FCS record and tied the NCAA all-division record of 14 career forced fumbles. He recorded a career total of 289 tackles, 15.0 sacks (10th in school history), 45 tackles-for-loss (seventh in school history), 14 forced fumbles (tied NCAA record), 12 pass breakups, one interception, two fumble recoveries, and one blocked kick while starting 35-of-43 games.

== Professional career ==
=== Pre-draft ===
Williams was not invited to participate at the 2009 NFL Scouting Combine, however he did take part in Northwestern University's Pro Day.

Pre-draft measurables
Height	Weight	40-yard dash	10-yard split	20-yard split	Vertical jump	Broad jump	Bench press
6 ft 1 in (1.85 m)	241 lb (109 kg)	4.49 s	1.49 s	2.59 s	39 in (0.99 m)	10 ft 9 in (3.28 m)	26 reps
All values from Pro Day

=== Dallas Cowboys ===
The Dallas Cowboys started the 2009 NFL draft without a first-round draft selection (part of the price to acquire Roy Williams) and then traded out of the second round, after they couldn't draft Max Unger. After posting great pre-draft numbers, the Cowboys surprised observers by selecting Williams in the third round (69th overall). He was inactive for 11 games (3 with a sprained left ankle) and played in only five, making two special teams tackles.

In 2010, during a 1–7 start, the Cowboys declared him inactive for two games because of poor play, before releasing him on November 2, based on his inability to grasp the defense and a lack of consistency on special teams. He appeared in five games, registering three defensive tackles, one pass defended and six special teams tackles.

=== Carolina Panthers (first stint) ===
On November 3, 2010, Williams was claimed off waivers by the Carolina Panthers. He recorded five tackles, one fumble recovery and two passes defended in two games as a starter at weak-side linebacker. He was placed on the injured reserve with a torn ACL on December 13. He finished with 15 defensive tackles, one pass defensed and 3 special teams tackles.

In 2011, he played in 14 games (two declared inactive) and started two contests at weakside linebacker. He had 21 defensive tackles, one forced fumble and 15 special teams tackles (led the team). He was released during final cuts on August 31, 2012.

=== Philadelphia Eagles ===
On October 9, 2012, he was signed by the Philadelphia Eagles. On November 3, he was released after playing in two games.

=== Carolina Panthers (second stint) ===
On November 5, 2012, he was claimed off waivers by the Panthers. He played in five games (three inactive) and registered five special teams tackles.

On August 31, 2013, he was released before the start of the season. On October 16, the Panthers re-signed him to take over Chase Blackburn's special teams duties, after he was named the starter at weakside linebacker. He blocked a punt against the New York Jets. He appeared in 11 games and tallied five special teams tackles.

In 2014, he appeared in 11 games (declared inactive in one contest), while making one defensive tackle and three special teams tackles. He was released on December 2.

=== Tampa Bay Buccaneers ===
On December 8, 2014, he was signed as free agent by the Tampa Bay Buccaneers, after Brandon Magee was placed on the injured reserve list. He played in three games, recording three defensive tackles and four special teams tackles.

Williams was re-signed on March 7, 2015. He was released on September 6, after the team claimed linebackers Jeremiah George and James-Michael Johnson.
