= Igor Olshansky =

Ukrainian gridiron football player (born 1982)

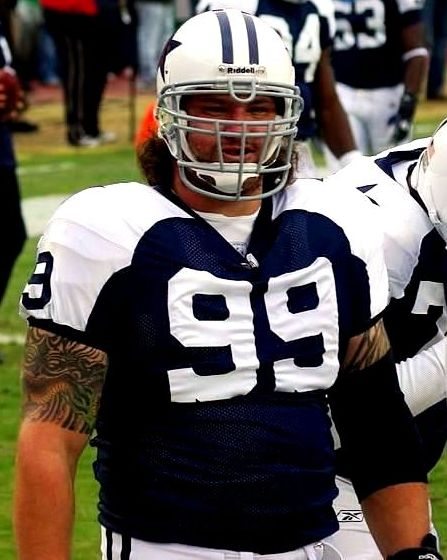
- Olshansky with the Dallas Cowboys in 2009

No. 99, 95
- Position: Defensive end

Personal information
- Born: 3 May 1982 (age 44); Dnipropetrovsk, Ukrainian SSR (now Ukraine)
- Listed height: 6 ft 6 in (1.98 m)
- Listed weight: 315 lb (143 kg)

Career information
- High school: St. Ignatius (San Francisco, California, U.S.)
- College: Oregon (2000–2003)
- NFL draft: 2004: 2nd round, 35th overall pick

Career history
- San Diego Chargers (2004–2008); Dallas Cowboys (2009–2010); Miami Dolphins (2011)

Career NFL statistics
- Total tackles: 263
- Sacks: 12.5
- Forced fumbles: 2
- Fumble recoveries: 1
- Interceptions: 1
- Stats at Pro Football Reference

Igor Olshansky (Note: Ukrainian: Ігор Ольшанський, romanized: Ihor Olshanskyi) (/oʊlˈʃænski/; born 3 May 1982) is a former professional football player who was a defensive end in the National Football League (NFL). He played college football at Oregon and was selected by the San Diego Chargers in the second round of the 2004 NFL draft. He also played for the Dallas Cowboys and Miami Dolphins.

He is the first Ukrainian to play in the NFL, and the first born in the Soviet Union to do so.

== Early life ==
Olshansky was born in the industrial city of Dnipropetrovsk, Ukrainian SSR (now Ukraine). His father Yury had played basketball for the Red Army. Shortly before the break-up of the Soviet Union, he and his family moved to San Francisco in 1989, when he was seven years old. His maternal grandfather, Abraham Rubshevsky, served in the Red Army during World War II and was wounded 11 times.

Olshansky is Jewish and he acknowledged that, "It's who I am; my culture; my roots". During his youth he attended the Lisa Kampner Hebrew Academy in San Francisco, headed by Rabbi Pinchos Lipner, an Orthodox Jewish day school. He then attended St. Ignatius College Preparatory on a basketball scholarship, and – already 6' 5" in the 10th grade – played basketball for the school until his junior year, while concurrently playing basketball in the Maccabiah Games in St. Louis and Milwaukee. After two years, he also began playing football in his junior year in high school.

== College career ==
At the University of Oregon, where he majored in psychology, Olshansky was honorable mention academic All-Pac-10 in his freshman year, and picked for Sports Illustrated's All-Bowl Game team at the end of the season. He was honorable mention All-Pac-10 as a sophomore, second-team All-Pac-10 as a junior, and recipient of the Joe Schaffeld Trophy as the Ducks' top defensive lineman after both his sophomore and junior seasons. He was used at all defensive line positions.

In his career at Oregon he had 146 tackles (89 solos), 11.5 sacks, 3 blocked kicks, and one 37-yard interception return in 38 games. Olshansky left school following his junior season, with one year of eligibility remaining.

He set a team record with a 505-pound bench press, and also holds team records in the clean and jerk and squat.

== Professional career ==
=== 2004 NFL Combine ===
Pre-draft measurables
Height	Weight	40-yard dash	10-yard split	20-yard split	20-yard shuttle	Three-cone drill	Vertical jump	Broad jump	Bench press
6 ft 5 1/4 in (1.96 m)	315 lb (143 kg)	4.96 s	1.75 s	2.80 s	4.41 s	7.61 s	33 1/2 in (0.85 m)	9 ft 2 in (2.79 m)	41 reps
All values from NFL Combine

In early try-outs for the draft, he bench-pressed 102.1 kilograms (225 lbs) 41 times on one try, two presses short of the rookie record. He ran the 40-yard dash in 4.9 seconds and jumped 33.5 inches from a stationary position. A National Football Conference scouting director observed: "He can play both end and tackle, he can control the point and rush the passer, he's a very good athlete."

=== San Diego Chargers ===
In the second round (35th overall) of the 2004 NFL draft, the San Diego Chargers selected Olshansky out of the University of Oregon. In August 2004, Olshansky and the Chargers agreed on a 6-year contract, with the final year being voidable. The contract called for a $2.25 million signing bonus and had a value of $5.2 million over five years, through the 2008 NFL season. He became the NFL's first Soviet-born player.

In his rookie season in 2004, he started all 16 of the team's games.

Olshansky was ejected from a game against the Denver Broncos on 19 November 2006. He punched Broncos center Tom Nalen after what appeared to be Nalen trying to cut block Olshansky on a clock-stopping spike play. Olshansky had recently had knee surgery when Nalen went after Olshansky's knees. Two days later, the NFL fined Nalen $25,000 for the cut block, more than double the $10,000 fine Olshansky received for the punch.

With the Chargers, he had 151 tackles and 11 sacks in 75 games, starting all but 5 of them.

=== Dallas Cowboys ===
Olshansky signed a four-year contract with the Dallas Cowboys on 6 March 2009. The deal was worth $18 million, with $8 million of it guaranteed. He finished the season with 76 tackles (seventh on the team), 2 tackles for loss, 1.5 sacks, 12 quarterback pressures and 3 passes defensed.

In 2010, he started 14 games, registering 38 tackles (tenth on the team), one tackle for loss, 4 quarterback pressures and 2 passes defensed. He was released on 3 September 2011.

=== Miami Dolphins ===
Olshansky was signed by the Miami Dolphins on 20 September 2011. He was waived on 30 November.

=== NFL career statistics ===
Legend
**Bold**	Career high

Year	Team	GP	Comb	Total	Ast	Sck	FF	FR	FR Yds	Int	IR Yds	Avg IR	Lng	TD	PD
2004	SD	16	39	24	15	1.0	0	0	0	0	0	0	0	0	2
2005	SD	14	29	18	11	3.0	0	0	0	0	0	0	0	0	0
2006	SD	13	33	18	15	1.5	0	**1**	0	0	0	0	0	0	1
2007	SD	16	**49**	**35**	14	**3.5**	**3**	0	0	**1**	0	0	0	0	**3**
2008	SD	16	29	21	8	2.0	0	0	0	0	0	0	0	0	0
2009	DAL	16	40	29	11	1.5	0	0	0	0	0	0	0	0	0
2010	DAL	16	38	17	**21**	0.0	0	0	0	0	0	0	0	0	2
2011	MIA	8	7	4	3	0.0	2	0	0	0	0	0	0	0	0
Career		115	264	166	98	12.5	5	1	0	1	0	0	0	0	8

== Personal life ==
He has many tattoos, including two Stars of David on his neck. He is regularly featured in Jewish news publications.

Olshansky is married to Liya Rubinshteyn, whom he met at the Lisa Kampner Hebrew Academy in San Francisco. They live in San Rafael, California, and have two sons.

Olshansky was detained on Thursday, December 1, 2011, for marijuana possession, as part of an undercover bust that resulted in 280 arrests. The Broward County, Florida, Sheriff's Office went to Olshansky's condo in Fort Lauderdale to investigate Olshansky's friend, but ended up detaining both men. He was never charged with possession of 19 grams of marijuana.

== See also ==
- List of select Jewish football players
