= Dallas Cowboys all-time roster =

1,289 players have appeared in at least one regular season or postseason game in the National Football League (NFL) for the Dallas Cowboys since 1960. This list is accurate through the end of the 2025 NFL season.

== A ==
- Bobby Abrams
- David Adams
- Flozell Adams
- Keith Adams
- Herb Adderley
- Hakeem Adeniji
- Margene Adkins
- Tommie Agee
- Vince Agnew
- Troy Aikman
- Chris Akins
- Alex Albright
- Vince Albritton
- Mackensie Alexander
- Ray Alexander
- Gary Allen
- Larry Allen
- Will Allen
- Lance Alworth
- Bradlee Anae
- Antonio Anderson
- Deon Anderson
- Richie Anderson
- George Andrie
- Bryan Anger
- Eli Ankou
- Scott Ankrom
- Anthony Armstrong
- Dorance Armstrong
- Jimmy Armstrong
- Ray-Ray Armstrong
- Tyji Armstrong
- Jim Arneson
- Richard Ash
- Bob Asher
- Brandon Aubrey
- Dowe Aughtman
- Marvin Austin
- Miles Austin
- Tavon Austin
- Rob Awalt
- Chidobe Awuzie
- Akin Ayodele
- Remi Ayodele

== B ==
- Gene Babb
- John Babinecz
- Dan Bailey
- Robert Bailey
- Jesse Baker
- Jon Baker
- Sam Baker
- Brian Baldinger
- Alan Ball
- Josh Ball
- Corey Ballentine
- Gordon Banks
- Marion Barber III
- Rod Barksdale
- Benny Barnes
- Darian Barnes
- Gary Barnes
- Reggie Barnes
- Rodrigo Barnes
- Anthony Barr
- Alex Barron
- Justin Barron
- Micheal Barrow
- Tarell Basham
- Ben Bass
- T. J. Bass
- Marv Bateman
- Bill Bates
- Michael Bates
- Michael Batiste
- Tra Battle
- Craig Baynham
- Cole Beasley
- Cooper Beebe
- Blake Bell
- Byron Bell
- Jason Bell
- Markquese Bell
- Martellus Bennett
- Michael Bennett
- Darren Benson
- Bené Benwikere
- Bob Bercich
- Joe Berger
- Mackenzy Bernadeau
- Francis Bernard
- Larry Bethea
- Steve Beuerlein
- Tyler Biadasz
- Erik Bickerstaff
- Dick Bielski
- Terry Billups
- Don Bishop
- Ken Bishop
- Eric Bjornson
- Alois Blackwell
- Kelly Blackwell
- Willie Blade
- Ricky Blake
- DaRon Bland
- Drew Bledsoe
- Alvin Blount
- Jaydon Blue
- Kenneth Boatright
- Jim Boeke
- Quinton Bohanna
- Brooks Bollinger
- Chris Boniol
- Tyler Booker
- Andrew Booth Jr.
- Nate Borden
- Rich Borresen
- Kyle Bosworth
- Joe Bowden
- Stephen Bowen
- Tom Braatz
- Byron Bradfute
- Kerry Brady
- Chris Brazzell
- Josh Brent
- Bob Breunig
- Robert Brewster
- Alundis Brice
- Trikweze Bridges
- Greg Briggs
- Lester Brinkley
- Larry Brinson
- Clyde Brock
- Keith Brooking
- Ethan Brooks
- Jalen Brooks
- Jamal Brooks
- Jermaine Brooks
- Kevin Brooks
- Michael Brooks
- Bob Brotzki
- Willie Broughton
- Anthony Brown
- Charles Brown
- Courtney Brown
- Eric Brown
- Everette Brown
- Guy Brown
- Kyron Brown
- Larry Brown
- Noah Brown
- Otto Brown
- Darrick Brownlow
- Antonio Bryant
- Dez Bryant
- Ventell Bryant
- David Buehler
- Amos Bullocks
- Ian Bunting
- Cornell Burbage
- Jackie Burkett
- Kevin Burnett
- Dave Burnette
- Deante Burton
- Ron Burton
- Bill Butler
- Brice Butler
- Josh Butler
- Mario Butler
- Quincy Butler
- Victor Butler

== C ==
- Lee Roy Caffey
- Rob Callaway
- Dan Campbell
- Ibraheim Campbell
- Parris Campbell
- Alan Campos
- Maurice Canady
- Billy Cannon Jr.
- Barry Cantrell
- Chris Canty
- Warren Capone
- Glenn Carano
- Harold Carmichael
- Bobby Carpenter
- Brandon Carr
- Duane Carrell
- Nolan Carroll
- Caelen Carson
- Leonardo Carson
- Bruce Carter
- David Carter
- Jon Carter
- Quincy Carter
- Ron'Dell Carter
- Shante Carver
- Scott Case
- Tony Casillas
- Aveion Cason
- Matt Cassel
- Quinton Caver
- Sal Cesario
- Robert Chancey
- Scott Chandler
- Thornton Chandler
- Shaun Chapas
- Taco Charlton
- Louis Cheek
- Randy Chevrier
- Darrin Chiaverini
- Ray Childress
- Zion Childress
- Tashard Choice
- Jordan Chunn
- Barry Church
- Steve Cisowski
- Darryl Clack
- Morris Claiborne
- Alijah Clark
- Damone Clark
- Jeremy Clark
- Kenny Clark
- Mike Clark
- Monte Clark
- Phil Clark
- Frank Clarke
- Hayward Clay
- DeVone Claybrooks
- Emmett Cleary
- Corey Clement
- Dextor Clinkscale
- Jadeveon Clowney
- Tyler Clutts
- Dexter Coakley
- Garry Cobb
- Randall Cobb
- Michael Coe
- Landon Cohen
- Larry Cole
- Alonzo Coleman
- Anthony Coleman
- Davon Coleman
- Kenyon Coleman
- Lincoln Coleman
- Marcus Coleman
- Ralph Coleman
- Reggie Collier
- Aviante Collins
- Javiar Collins
- La'el Collins
- Maliek Collins
- Marc Colombo
- Jim Colvin
- Jon Condo
- Fred Cone
- Mike Connelly
- Dan Connor
- Bobby Joe Conrad
- Dalvin Cook
- Ryan Cook
- Brandin Cooks
- Amari Cooper
- Chris Cooper
- Jim Cooper
- Jonathan Cooper
- Reggie Cooper
- Terrance Copper
- Ajani Cornelius
- Frank Cornish
- Fred Cornwell
- José Cortez
- Quentin Coryatt
- Doug Cosbie
- Phil Costa
- Vince Courville
- Chris Covington
- Christian Covington
- Jabril Cox
- Tyler Coyle
- Jack Crawford
- Tyrone Crawford
- Patrick Crayton
- Willis Crockett
- Gene Cronin
- Kenwin Cummings
- Billy Cundiff
- Randall Cunningham
- Richie Cunningham
- Tony Curtis
- Andy Cvercko

== D ==
- Andy Dalton
- Dick Daniels
- Woodrow Dantzler
- Billy Davis
- Carl Davis
- Donnie Davis
- Keith Davis
- Kyle Davis
- Leonard Davis
- Malik Davis
- Nathan Davis
- Ryan Davis
- Sonny Davis
- Wendell Davis
- Andrew Davison
- Everett Dawkins
- Treston Decoud
- Jack Del Rio
- Pat Dennis
- Doug Dennison
- Steve DeOssie
- Harold Deters
- Buddy Dial
- Jorge Diaz
- Anthony Dickerson
- Paul Dickson
- Trevon Diggs
- Gennaro DiNapoli
- Ben DiNucci
- Mike Ditka
- James Dixon
- Tony Dixon
- Derrick Dockery
- Fred Doelling
- Ray Donaldson
- Doug Donley
- Leon Donohue
- Pat Donovan
- Jim Doran
- Tony Dorsett
- Char-ron Dorsey
- Merrill Douglas
- Mike Dowdle
- Rico Dowdle
- Michael Downs
- Kenny Duckett
- Fred Dugan
- Chris Duliban
- Lance Dunbar
- Perry Lee Dunn
- L. G. Dupre
- Billy Joe DuPree
- Justin Durant
- John Dutton
- Mike Dwyer

== E ==
- Ricky Easmon
- Ron East
- Chad Eaton
- Chuma Edoga
- Dave Edwards
- Dixon Edwards
- Kelvin Edwards
- Lavar Edwards
- Mario Edwards
- Jim Eidson
- Ebenezer Ekuban
- Abram Elam
- Kaiir Elam
- Onzy Elam
- Ezekiel Elliott
- Jayrone Elliott
- Lin Elliott
- Greg Ellis
- Cameron Erving
- Gavin Escobar
- Demetric Evans
- Rashaan Evans
- Thomas Everett
- Donovan Ezeiruaku

== F ==
- Jason Fabini
- Mike Falls
- Princeton Fant
- Austin Faoliu
- Matt Farniok
- Anthony Fasano
- Simi Fehoko
- Ron Fellows
- Jake Ferguson
- Jason Ferguson
- Tony Fiammetta
- Anthony Fieldings
- Aaron Fields
- Filip Filipović
- Joe Fishback
- John Fitzgerald
- Harry Flaherty
- John Flannery
- Cameron Fleming
- Cory Fleming
- Ryan Flournoy
- Richmond Flowers Jr.
- Nick Folk
- Lee Folkins
- Steve Folsom
- Kai Forbath
- Bernard Ford
- Dante Fowler
- Ryan Fowler
- Todd Fowler
- Eric Frampton
- Ron Francis
- Tom Franckhauser
- Bill Frank
- Kavon Frazier
- Lance Frazier
- Andy Frederick
- Travis Frederick
- Doug Free
- Ben Fricke
- Byron Frisch
- Toni Fritsch
- Ken Frost
- Bob Fry
- Jean Fugett
- Scott Fujita

== G ==
- Andrew Gachkar
- Mike Gaechter
- Derrick Gainer
- Scott Galbraith
- Neville Gallimore
- Joey Galloway
- Michael Gallup
- Kenneth Gant
- Kelvin Garmon
- Jason Garrett
- Walt Garrison
- Rico Gathers
- Everett Gay
- Clifton Geathers
- Peter Gent
- Eddie George
- John Gesek
- Aaron Gibson
- Luke Gifford
- Garrett Gilbert
- Stephon Gilmore
- Aaron Glenn
- Terry Glenn
- La'Roi Glover
- Junior Glymph
- Randall Godfrey
- Kevin Gogan
- Chauncey Golston
- John Gonzaga
- Leon Gonzalez
- Dwayne Goodrich
- C. J. Goodwin
- Cletis Gordon
- Cornell Gowdy
- Toby Gowin
- Martin Gramatica
- Charley Granger
- Norm Granger
- Orantes Grant
- Jeff Grau
- Alex Green
- Allen Green
- Chaz Green
- Cornell Green
- Skyler Green
- Forrest Gregg
- Bill Gregory
- Glynn Gregory
- Randy Gregory
- Everson Griffen
- Chris Gronkowski
- Bob Grottkau
- Andre Gurode
- Buzz Guy
- Tyler Guyton

== H ==
- Halvor Hagen
- Lirim Hajrullahu
- Charles Haley
- Chris Hall
- Kemon Hall
- Lemanski Hall
- Darren Hambrick
- Troy Hambrick
- Dean Hamel
- Jakar Hamilton
- Justin Hamilton
- Ken Hamlin
- Michael Hamlin
- Johnathan Hankins
- James Hanna
- Ryan Hannam
- Wayne Hansen
- Darryl Hardy
- Greg Hardy
- JaQuan Hardy
- Kevin Hardy
- Sean Harlow
- Alvin Harper
- Dave Harper
- Devin Harper
- Roger Harper
- Cliff Harris
- Darius Harris
- Duriel Harris
- Dwayne Harris
- Jackie Harris
- Jimmy Harris
- Rod Harris
- Jason Hatcher
- Donald Hawkins
- Duane Hawthorne
- Nick Hayden
- Bob Hayes
- Wendell Hayes
- Tommy Haynes
- Harold Hays
- Don Healy
- Jeff Heath
- George Hegamin
- Mike Hegman
- Don Heinrich
- Dale Hellestrae
- Nate Hemsley
- Peyton Hendershot
- Thomas Henderson
- Steve Hendrickson
- Manny Hendrix
- Tim Hendrix
- Chad Hennings
- Anthony Henry
- KJ Henry
- Marcus Henry
- Drew Henson
- Bill Herchman
- Efrén Herrera
- Mark Higgs
- Alonzo Highsmith
- Jon Hilbert
- Bill Hill
- Calvin Hill
- Rod Hill
- Tony Hill (born 1956)
- Tony Hill (born 1968)
- Trysten Hill
- Tony Hills
- T. Y. Hilton
- Anthony Hitchens
- Damon Hodge
- Brock Hoffman
- Gary Hogeboom
- Montrae Holland
- Jesse Holley
- DeVonte Holloman
- Johnny Holloway
- Andre Holmes
- Clayton Holmes
- Issiac Holt
- Dennis Homan
- Malik Hooker
- Mitch Hoopes
- Ray Horton
- John Houser
- Bill Houston
- Dennis Houston
- James Houston
- Carl Howard
- David Howard
- Percy Howard
- Ron Howard
- Chuck Howley
- Billy Howton
- Lynn Hoyem
- Oliver Hoyte
- Johnny Huggins
- Randy Hughes
- Tyrone Hughes
- Buddy Humphrey
- John Hunt
- Monty Hunter
- Pete Hunter
- Jeff Hurd
- Sam Hurd
- Allen Hurns
- Eric Hurt
- Ed Husmann
- Ken Hutcherson
- Chad Hutchinson
- Bruce Huther
- Tony Hutson
- Kerry Hyder

== I ==
- Noah Igbinoghene
- Corvey Irvin
- Michael Irvin
- David Irving
- Joe Isbell
- Rocket Ismail

== J ==
- Alcender Jackson
- Darius Jackson
- Joe Jackson
- Tim Jackson
- Bradie James
- Shemar James
- Blake Jarwin
- Garth Jax
- Jim Jeffcoat
- Patrick Jeffers
- Malik Jefferson
- Mike Jenkins
- Keith Jennings
- Jim Jensen
- John Jett
- Al Johnson
- Brad Johnson
- Buddy Johnson
- Butch Johnson
- Curtis Johnson
- Keyshawn Johnson
- Manuel Johnson
- Mike Johnson
- Mitch Johnson
- Tank Johnson
- Thomas Johnson
- Walter Johnson
- Daryl Johnston
- Adam Jones
- Byron Jones
- Chris Jones
- Dale Jones
- Datone Jones
- E. J. Jones
- Ed "Too Tall" Jones
- Edgar Jones
- Felix Jones
- James Jones
- Jermaine Jones
- Jimmie Jones
- Josh Jones
- Julius Jones
- Nate Jones
- Robert Jones
- Lee Roy Jordan
- Kelvin Joseph
- Linval Joseph

== K ==
- Jason Kaiser
- Azur Kamara
- Damontae Kazee
- Frank Kearse
- Jayron Kearse
- Trevor Keegan
- Mike Keller
- Eric Kendricks
- Derek Kennard
- Crawford Ker
- Gene Killian
- Keylon Kincade
- Steve Kiner
- Angelo King
- Mike Kiselak
- Jon Kitna
- Syd Kitson
- Dick Klein
- Marshawn Kneeland
- Brandon Knight
- Micah Knorr
- Bernie Kosar
- Kyle Kosier
- Walt Kowalczyk
- Kevin Kowalski
- Jake Kupp
- Aaron Kyle

== L ==
- L. P. Ladouceur
- David LaFleur
- Scott Laidlaw
- CeeDee Lamb
- Trey Lance
- Isaiah Land
- David Lang
- Kareem Larrimore
- Derrick Lassic
- Babe Laufenberg
- Robert Lavette
- Burton Lawless
- Cameron Lawrence
- DeMarcus Lawrence
- Carl Lawson
- Ryan Leaf
- Ronald Leary
- Eddie LeBaron
- ReShard Lee
- Sean Lee
- Matt Lehr
- Orie Lemon
- Lance Lenoir
- Tim Lester
- Leon Lett
- Nick Leverett
- D. D. Lewis
- Jourdan Lewis
- LeQuan Lewis
- Woodley Lewis
- George Lilja
- Bob Lilly
- Kevin Lilly
- Tony Liscio
- Sean Lissemore
- Marist Liufau
- Nate Livings
- Bruce Livingston
- Warren Livingston
- J. W. Lockett
- Eugene Lockhart
- Obert Logan
- Bob Long
- Jerome Long
- Clint Longley
- Joe Looney
- Billy Lothridge
- Mike Lucky
- Hunter Luepke

== M ==
- Louis Mackey
- Phil Mafah
- Brett Maher
- Dave Manders
- Wade Manning
- Justin March
- Brock Marion
- Amos Marsh
- Harvey Martin
- Jamar Martin
- Kelvin Martin
- Zack Martin
- Russell Maryland
- Ray Mathews
- Kevin Mathis
- Vince Mayle
- Benson Mayowa
- Mat McBriar
- Bryan McCann
- Rolando McClain
- Terrell McClain
- Hurvin McCormack
- Danny McCray
- Bob McCreary
- Dave McDaniels
- Paul McDonald
- Tommy McDonald
- Darren McFadden
- Leon McFadden
- Marques McFadden
- Wane McGarity
- Stephen McGee
- Tony McGee
- Connor McGovern
- Don McIlhenny
- Everett McIver
- Sean McKeon
- Jason McKie
- Jeremy McKinney
- Dennis McKinnon
- James McKnight
- Scott McLean
- Ryan McNeil
- Jake McQuaide
- Pat McQuistan
- Chuck McSwain
- Henry Melton
- Dale Memmelaar
- Don Meredith
- John Meyers
- Christine Michael
- Joey Mickey
- Anthony Miller
- Jim Miller
- Lonyae Miller
- Ernie Mills
- Joe Milton
- Jeremy Mincey
- Jonathan Mingo
- Dwayne Missouri
- Aaron Mitchell
- Johnny Mitchell
- Terrance Mitchell
- Singor Mobley
- Dicky Moegle
- Mike Montgomery
- Damontre Moore
- Kellen Moore
- Sterling Moore
- Zach Moore
- Brian Moorman
- Jim Mooty
- Jalen Moreno-Cropper
- Dennis Morgan
- Quincy Morgan
- Alfred Morris
- Sammy Morris
- Craig Morton
- Israel Mukuamu
- Trayvon Mullen
- Lee Murchison
- DeMarco Murray
- Eddie Murray
- Kenneth Murray
- Adrian Murrell
- Greg Myers
- Michael Myers
- Godfrey Myles
- Tom Myslinski

== N ==
- Bill Nagy
- Keanu Neal
- Lewis Neal
- Ralph Neely
- Ryan Neufeld
- Drake Nevis
- Robert Newhouse
- Terence Newman
- Timmy Newsome
- Nate Newton
- Dat Nguyen
- John Niland
- Hunter Niswander
- John Nix
- Brandon Noble
- Dick Nolan
- Ben Noll
- Danny Noonan
- Pettis Norman
- Jerry Norton
- Ken Norton Jr.
- Jay Novacek
- Ty Nsekhe
- Mike Nugent
- Ed Nutting
- Blaine Nye
- Mark Nzeocha

== O ==
- Steve Octavien
- Osa Odighizuwa
- Eric Ogbogu
- Jeff Ogden
- Evan Oglesby
- Kevin Ogletree
- Deji Olatoye
- Jamize Olawale
- Qadree Ollison
- Sewo Olonilua
- Igor Olshansky
- Donovan Olumba
- Keith O'Neil
- Kyle Orton
- Amani Oruwariye
- Paul Oswald
- Bob Otto
- DeMarvion Overshown
- Jerry Overton
- Matt Overton
- Billy Owens
- Terrell Owens
- Akwasi Owusu-Ansah

== P ==
- Stephen Paea
- Craig Page
- Solomon Page
- Paul Palmer
- Walter Palmore
- J'Vonne Parker
- Steven Parker
- Billy Parks
- Jermey Parnell
- Tony Parrish
- Micah Parsons
- Jack Patera
- Tyler Patmon
- Elvis Patterson
- Sam Paulescu
- Drew Pearson
- Preston Pearson
- Rodney Peete
- Micah Pellerin
- Steve Pelluer
- Jesse Penn
- George Peoples
- Charlie Peprah
- Mac Percival
- Don Perkins
- Ray Perkins
- Stephen Peterman
- Jason Peters
- Kurt Petersen
- Cal Peterson
- Rob Petitti
- John Phillips
- Jordan Phillips
- Kirk Phillips
- George Pickens
- Brett Pierce
- Willie Pile
- Cyril Pinder
- Kavika Pittman
- Kurt Ploeger
- Dontari Poe
- Lance Poimboeuf
- Lousaka Polite
- Carlos Polk
- Tony Pollard
- David Ponder
- Brady Poppinga
- Garry Porterfield
- Karl Powe
- Jemeel Powell
- Phil Pozderac
- Dak Prescott
- Brian Price
- Jim Price
- Peerless Price
- Troy Pride
- Cory Procter
- Mickey Pruitt
- Jethro Pugh
- Duane Putnam

== Q ==
- Mike Quinn
- Robert Quinn

== R ==
- Tom Rafferty
- Nick Ralston
- Ken-Yon Rambo
- Tom Randall
- Joseph Randle
- Sonny Randle
- Jeremiah Ratliff
- Caesar Rayford
- Jamaica Rector
- Adam Redmond
- Sheldrick Redwine
- Beasley Reece
- Guy Reese
- Izell Reese
- Dan Reeves
- Jacques Reeves
- Caraun Reid
- Mel Renfro
- Mike Renfro
- Lance Rentzel
- Shavon Revel
- Xavier Rhodes
- Jerry Rhome
- Asim Richards
- Curvin Richards
- Golden Richards
- Howard Richards
- Gloster Richardson
- Colin Ridgway
- Jimmy Ridlon
- Christian Ringo
- Marco Rivera
- John Roach
- Alfredo Roberts
- Jeff Robinson
- Larry Robinson
- Laurent Robinson
- Rashard Robinson
- Reggie Robinson
- Robert Rochell
- Bill Roe
- Jacob Rogers
- Justin Rogers (linebacker)
- Jeff Rohrer
- Tony Romo
- John Roper
- Daniel Ross
- Derek Ross
- Dominique Ross
- Oliver Ross
- Allen Rossum
- Martin Rucker
- Reggie Rucker
- Cooper Rush
- Ryan Russell
- Roger Ruzek
- Sean Ryan

== S ==
- Jimmy Saddler-McQueen
- Jay Saldi
- Brian Salonen
- Jack Sanborn
- Mark Sanchez
- Bill Sandeman
- Deion Sanders
- Miles Sanders
- O. J. Santiago
- Broderick Sargent
- Eric Saubert
- Buzz Sawyer
- Mike Saxon
- Orlando Scandrick
- Noel Scarlett
- Brian Schaefering
- Greg Schaum
- Ray Schoenke
- Luke Schoonmaker
- Chris Schultz
- Dalton Schultz
- Jim Schwantz
- Steve Scifres
- Chuck Scott
- Darnay Scott
- Herbert Scott
- Kevin Scott
- Lynn Scott
- Sean Scott
- Victor Scott
- Tim Seder
- Ron Sellers
- George Selvie
- Greg Senat
- Andrew Sendejo
- Gerald Sensabaugh
- Rafael Septién
- Ryan Seymour
- Scott Shanle
- Randy Shannon
- Robert Shaw
- Joe Shearin
- Derrick Shepard
- Dakoda Shepley
- Dave Sherer
- Mike Sherrard
- Jon Shields
- Clay Shiver
- Les Shy
- Junior Siavii
- Trent Sieg
- Mana Silva
- Cleo Simmons
- Dave Simmons
- Victor Simmons
- Ernie Sims
- Alshermond Singleton
- Tony Slaton
- Stan Smagala
- Don Smerek
- Aldon Smith
- Andre Smith
- Artie Smith
- Darrin Smith
- Daryle Smith
- Devin Smith
- Donald Smith
- Emmitt Smith
- Eric Smith
- Ito Smith
- J. D. Smith
- Jackie Smith
- Jaylon Smith
- Jim Ray Smith
- Jimmy Smith
- Keith Smith
- Kevin Smith
- Malcolm Smith
- Mazi Smith
- Rod Smith
- Saivion Smith
- Sean Smith
- Timmy Smith
- Tody Smith
- Tyler Smith
- Tyron Smith
- Vinson Smith
- Waddell Smith
- Zuriel Smith
- Loren Snyder
- Jesse Solomon
- Roland Solomon
- Mike Solwold
- Brevyn Spann-Ford
- Phillippi Sparks
- Marcus Spears
- Alonzo Spellman
- Anthony Spencer
- C. J. Spillman
- Sebron Spivey
- Danny Spradlin
- Ron Springs
- Jeremy Sprinkle
- Micheal Spurlock
- Dave Stalls
- Isaiah Stanback
- Roger Staubach
- Markus Steele
- Robert Steele
- Terence Steele
- Larry Stephens
- Mark Stepnoski
- Reddy Steward
- Curtis Stewart
- Daleroy Stewart
- Jim Stiger
- Tom Stincic
- Clint Stoerner
- Sims Stokes
- Ron Stone
- Omar Stoutmire
- Otto Stowe
- Les Strayhorn
- Devin Street
- Fred Strickland
- Danny Stubbs
- Darren Studstill
- Oscar Sturgis
- Andy Stynchula
- Xavier Suʻa-Filo
- Nicky Sualua
- Shaun Suisham
- Geoff Swaim
- Russ Swan
- Kevin Sweeney
- Reggie Swinton
- Ryan Switzer

== T ==
- Don Talbert
- Phillip Tanner
- Charles Tapper
- Junior Tautalatasi
- Tony Taylor
- Armani Taylor-Prioleau
- George Teague
- Derek Tennell
- Vinny Testaverde
- Anthony Thomas
- Bill Thomas
- Blair Thomas
- Broderick Thomas
- Dave Thomas
- Duane Thomas
- Ike Thomas
- Joe Thomas
- Juanyeh Thomas
- Nate Thomas
- Robert Thomas
- Solomon Thomas
- Zach Thomas
- Broderick Thompson
- Darian Thompson
- Deonte Thompson
- Tyson Thompson
- Andy Thorn
- Bruce Thornton (born 1958)
- Bruce Thornton (born 1980)
- Cedric Thornton
- Kalen Thornton
- Dennis Thurman
- Kirk Timmer
- Ken Tippins
- Glen Titensor
- Jay Toia
- Jalen Tolbert
- Tony Tolbert
- Pat Toomay
- Korey Toomer
- Willie Townes
- Greg Tremble
- Billy Truax
- Jerry Tubbs
- Jason Tucker
- Ross Tucker
- Torrin Tucker
- Mark Tuinei
- Robert Turbin
- Jimmie Turner
- Malik Turner
- KaVontae Turpin

== U ==
- Mike Ulufale
- Dimitrius Underwood
- Brent Urban

== V ==
- Matt Vanderbeek
- Leighton Vander Esch
- Mike Vanderjagt
- Dick Van Raaphorst
- Deuce Vaughn
- Jason Vega
- Alan Veingrad
- Lawrence Vickers
- Nick Vigil
- Danny Villanueva
- Kurt Vollers

== W ==
- Mark Walen
- Matt Waletzko
- Casey Walker
- Frank Walker
- Gary Walker
- Herschel Walker
- Louie Walker
- Malcolm Walker
- Rodney Wallace
- Everson Walls
- Steve Walsh
- Michael Walter
- Tyson Walter
- Bruce Walton
- Dedric Ward
- DeMarcus Ware
- Derek Ware
- Chris Warren
- John Warren
- Chauncey Washington
- James Washington (born 1965)
- James Washington (born 1996)
- Mark Washington
- Brian Waters
- Charlie Waters
- Carlos Watkins
- Kendell Watkins
- Pat Watkins
- Dekoda Watson
- Randy Watts
- Russell Wayt
- Colston Weatherington
- B. W. Webb
- Brandon Weeden
- Darrion Weems
- Claxton Welch
- Norm Wells
- Bryant Westbrook
- Chris Westry
- James Whalen
- Tyrus Wheat
- Kenny Wheaton
- Bob White
- Corey White
- Danny White
- Gerald White
- Marvin White
- Randy White
- Lucky Whitehead
- A. D. Whitfield
- Fred Whittingham
- Ron Widby
- Dave Widell
- Kyle Wilber
- John Wilbur
- J. J. Wilcox
- Marcellus Wiley
- Michael Wiley
- Brandon Williams
- Charlie Williams
- Connor Williams
- Erik Williams
- Jason Williams
- Javonte Williams
- Joe Williams
- John Williams
- Kevin Williams
- Leon Williams
- Quinnen Williams
- Randal Williams
- Robert Williams
- Roy Williams (born 1980)
- Roy Williams (born 1981)
- Sam Williams
- Sherman Williams
- Stepfret Williams
- Terrance Williams
- Tyrone Williams (born 1970)
- Tyrone Williams (born 1973)
- Ken Willis
- Mitch Willis
- Cedrick Wilson Jr.
- Damien Wilson
- Donovan Wilson
- Logan Wilson
- Martez Wilson
- Robert Wilson
- Steve Wilson
- Wade Wilson
- Perrion Winfrey
- Gary Wisener
- Terry Witherspoon
- Jason Witten
- Antwaun Woods
- Xavier Woods
- Darren Woodson
- Rolly Woolsey
- Daryl Worley
- Barron Wortham
- Alexander Wright
- Anthony Wright
- Charles Wright
- Nahshon Wright
- Rayfield Wright
- Steve Wright
- Jarius Wynn

== Y ==
- Maury Youmans
- Charley Young
- Ryan Young
- Sam Young

== Z ==
- Peppi Zellner
- Luis Zendejas
- Mike Zentic
- Jeff Zimmerman
- Greg Zuerlein
