= 1991 Dallas Cowboys season =

NFL team season

- Owner: Jerry Jones
- General manager: Jerry Jones and Jimmy Johnson
- Head coach: Jimmy Johnson
- Offensive coordinator: Norv Turner
- Defensive coordinator: Dave Wannstedt
- Home stadium: Texas Stadium

Results
- Record: 11–5
- Division place: 2nd NFC East
- Playoffs: Won Wild Card Playoffs (at Bears) 17–13; Lost Divisional Playoffs (at Lions) 6–38
- Pro Bowlers: Emmitt Smith RB; Michael Irvin WR; Troy Aikman QB; Jay Novacek TE

The 1991 Dallas Cowboys season was the franchise's 32nd season in the National Football League (NFL) and was the third year of the franchise under the ownership of Jerry Jones and head coach Jimmy Johnson. This also marked Norv Turner's first year as offensive coordinator under head coach Jimmy Johnson. The Cowboys improved on their 7–9 record from 1990, finishing 11–5 (their first winning season in six years), made the playoffs for the first time since 1985, and won their first playoff game in 9 years (1982).

The young offensive nucleus of what soon became known as “The Triplets,” Troy Aikman, Michael Irvin and Emmitt Smith, continued to develop as did the offensive line and the defense also improved. Though the Cowboys would lose in the playoffs to the Detroit Lions in the divisional round, the season was considered a resounding success, and a glimpse of things to come. Notable additions to the team this year include defensive tackle Russell Maryland, wide receiver Alvin Harper, offensive tackle Erik Williams, defensive tackle Leon Lett, cornerback Larry Brown and linebacker Dixon Edwards.

== Offseason ==
=== NFL draft ===
1991 Dallas Cowboys draft
Round	Pick	Player	Position	College	Notes
1	1	Russell Maryland *	DT	Miami (FL)	
1	12	Alvin Harper	WR	Tennessee	
1	20	Kelvin Pritchett	DT	Ole Miss	He was immediately traded to the Detroit Lions
2	37	Dixon Edwards	LB	Michigan State	
3	62	Godfrey Myles	LB	Florida	
3	64	James Richards	OG	California	
3	70	Erik Williams *	OT	Central State (OH)	
4	97	Curvin Richards	RB	Pittsburgh	
4	106	Bill Musgrave	QB	Oregon	
4	108	Tony Hill	DE	Tennessee-Chattanooga	
4	110	Kevin Harris	DE	Texas Southern	
5	132	Darrick Brownlow	LB	Illinois	
6	153	Mike Sullivan	OG	Miami (FL)	
7	173	Leon Lett *	DT	Emporia State	
7	235	Damon Mays	WR	Missouri	
7	264	Sean Love	OG	Penn State	
7	291	Tony Boles	RB	Michigan	
7	320	Larry Brown	CB	TCU	
Made roster † Pro Football Hall of Fame * Made at least one Pro Bowl during career

=== Undrafted free agents ===
1991 undrafted free agents of note
Player	Position	College
Cary Blanchard	Kicker	Oklahoma State
Reggie Cooper	Linebacker	Nebraska
Ricky Martin	Wide receiver	Middle Tennessee State
Duane Miller	Guard	Texas
Keith Powe	Defensive end	UTEP
Lance Zeno	Center	UCLA

== Staff ==
1991 Dallas Cowboys staff
Ownership Owner/General Manager – Jerry Jones Front office: Director of Player Personnel – Bob Ackles; Director of College Scouting – Dick Mansperger; Scouts – Jim Garrett, Walter Juliff, Ron Marciniak, Jeff Smith, and Walt Yowarsky; Head coaches Head Coach – Jimmy Johnson Offensive coaches: Offensive Coordinator/Quarterbacks – Norv Turner; Receivers – Hubbard Alexander; Running Backs – Joe Brodsky; Tight Ends – Robert Ford; Offensive Line – Tony Wise	Defensive coaches: Defensive Coordinator/Linebackers – Dave Wannstedt; Defensive Backs – Dave Campo; Defensive Line – Butch Davis; Defensive Assistant – Ron Meeks; Special teams coaches: Special Teams – Joe Avezzano; Kickers/Quality Control – Steve Hoffman; Strength and conditioning: Strength and Conditioning – Steve Woicik; Trainer – Kevin O'Neill

== Roster ==
Dallas Cowboys 1991 roster
Quarterbacks: 8 Troy Aikman; 7 Steve Beuerlein; 9 Craig Kupp; Running backs: 34 Tommie Agee; 48 Daryl Johnston FB; 22 Emmitt Smith; Wide receivers: 80 Alvin Harper; 88 Michael Irvin; 83 Kelvin Martin PR; 81 Alexander Wright KR; Tight ends: 89 Rob Awalt; 84 Jay Novacek; 87 Alfredo Roberts	Offensive linemen: 63 John Gesek G; 66 Kevin Gogan G; 61 Nate Newton T; 53 Mark Stepnoski C; 71 Mark Tuinei T; 76 Alan Veingrad G; 79 Erik Williams T; Defensive linemen: 75 Tony Casillas DT; 90 Tony Hill DE; 77 Jim Jeffcoat DE; 97 Jimmie Jones DT; 78 Leon Lett DT; 67 Russell Maryland DT; 73 Danny Noonan DT; 92 Tony Tolbert DE	Linebackers: 59 Darrick Brownlow MLB; 93 Reggie Cooper OLB; 55 Jack Del Rio MLB; 58 Dixon Edwards OLB; 51 Ken Norton Jr. OLB; 52 Mickey Pruitt OLB; 57 Vinson Smith OLB; Defensive backs: 40 Bill Bates SS; 24 Larry Brown CB; 29 Kenneth Gant CB; 45 Manny Hendrix CB; 30 Issiac Holt CB; 20 Ray Horton FS; 42 Stan Smagala FS; 37 James Washington SS; 23 Robert Williams CB; Special teams: 70 Dale Hellestrae LS; 4 Mike Saxon P; 1 Ken Willis K	Reserve lists: 36 Vince Albritton S (IR); 46 Ricky Blake RB (IR); 44 Michael Brooks S (IR); -- Kevin Harris DE (NF-Inj.); -- Chad Hennings DT (Military Reserve); 98 Godfrey Myles LB (IR); 27 Curvin Richards RB (IR); 82 Derrick Shepard WR (IR); Practice squad: -- Lorenzo Graham RB; -- Damon Mays WR; 39 Donald Smith CB; -- James Richards C/LS; -- Mike Sullivan G/T; Rookies in italics 47 active, 8 inactive, 5 practice squad

== Preseason ==
Week	Date	Opponent	Result	Record	Venue	Attendance
1	August 3	at Kansas City Chiefs	W 24–14	1–0	Arrowhead Stadium	56,038
2	August 12	Los Angeles Raiders	L 12–17	1–1	Texas Stadium	55,981
3	August 18	at Houston Oilers	L 20–30	1–2	Houston Astrodome	53,314
4	August 23	Atlanta Falcons	W 20–17 (OT)	2–2	Texas Stadium	53,689

== Regular season ==
The season began with a strong 26–14 victory over Cleveland and a close Monday night loss to Washington, 33–31. However, in Week Three the Cowboys were defeated at home by Philadelphia, 24–0. The Eagles sacked Troy Aikman eleven times, limited the Cowboys to just 90 yards of offense, and served notice that the Cowboys were still behind the "contenders" in the NFC East.

A narrow victory the next week over the Cardinals did little to change that contention. However, in Week 5, the Cowboys scored on a 23-yard touchdown to Michael Irvin and upset the defending Super Bowl champion Giants 21–16 (snapping a 6-game losing streak to the Giants).

The momentum from the Giants win carried the Cowboys to three wins in the next four games, besting the slumping Packers and winless Bengals. After a turnover-plagued humiliation at Detroit, the Cowboys manhandled the Cardinals again and now stood at 6–3.

But then the Cowboys lost to the Oilers in overtime (the Cowboys were driving close to field goal range in the overtime period when Emmitt Smith committed a rare fumble). The next week, they lost at the Giants in a game Jimmy Johnson said was "officiated as poorly" as any he had ever coached in.

At 6–5, the playoff chances seemed in serious jeopardy, especially with their upcoming opponent being a road game against the undefeated (and eventual Super bowl champion) Washington Redskins. However, Jimmy Johnson presented a gambling game plan for the Redskins game, including a first-half onside kick, several decisions to "go for it" on 4th down at unusual times, and opting to throw for the end zone on the final play of the first half even though the team was within field goal range at the Redskins' 34-yard line. Alvin Harper made the catch for a TD. The gambling game plan worked and the Cowboys completed a titanic 24–21 upset of the Redskins. Troy Aikman was injured in the Redskins game and was replaced early in the 2nd half by Steve Beuerlein (who had been signed late in the pre-season so as to avoid the problems at backup QB that plagued the Cowboys late in the 1990 season).

Aikman's injury was serious enough for him to miss the rest of the regular season. After the Washington win, Beuerlein led the Cowboys to four straight victories to end the season. In Dallas's final game against Chuck Noll, the Cowboys defeated the Steelers 20–10, then defeated Dallas's former starter Steve Walsh and the Saints 23–14. The Eagles were downed 25–13 and then the Cowboys edged the Falcons 31–27; Jimmy Johnson, fearing complacency in his young players, called a snap full pads practice in driving rain the Friday before.

The Cowboys' 11–5 record was good enough to earn a wildcard playoff berth. In most of the games, the Beuerlein-led offense was limited in passing yardage but the passing offense avoided serious mistakes and was helped by strong defensive performances and by Emmitt Smith, who finished the season with his first NFL rushing title. The biggest win of the Cowboys' late-season streak was a 25–13 win road win over the Philadelphia Eagles. It snapped a 7-game losing streak to the Eagles in "non-replacement games" and avenged the 24–0 loss back in week 3. In fairness, the Eagles were down to their third quarterback for this game (starter Randall Cunningham was lost for the season in week 1 and Jim McMahon, who had led the Eagles to their earlier win over Dallas, was also injured, leaving the reins to Jeff Kemp).

The special teams coached by Joe Avezzano were a strength of the Cowboys:

- Dallas led the NFC in special teams effectiveness and ranked second in the NFL behind the Los Angeles Raiders.
- It led the league in special teams touchdowns (3) and average kickoff return (21.7 yards).
- The Cowboys placed a player in the top three in the NFL in both punt and kickoff return averages in the same season for the first time in team history. In addition, Alexander Wright's 102 yard kickoff return against the Atlanta Falcons and Kelvin Martin's 85 yard punt return against the Philadelphia Eagles were NFL season-bests.
- Kicker Ken Willis tied a club record with 27 field goals and set another with four 50-yarders.
- Punter Mike Saxon finished tied for fourth in the NFL with a career best 36.8 yard net average.
- Blocked three punts, returning one for a touchdown against the Houston Oilers.
- The special teams also recovered an onside kick against the Washington Redskins, forced a safety and recovered two punts fumbled by opponents.

=== Schedule ===
Week	Date	Opponent	Result	Record	Venue	Attendance
1	September 1	at Cleveland Browns	**W** 26–14	1–0	Cleveland Municipal Stadium	78,860
2	September 9	**Washington Redskins**	**L** 31–33	1–1	Texas Stadium	63,025
3	September 15	**Philadelphia Eagles**	**L** 0–24	1–2	Texas Stadium	62,656
4	September 22	at **Phoenix Cardinals**	**W** 17–9	2–2	Sun Devil Stadium	68,814
5	September 29	**New York Giants**	**W** 21–16	3–2	Texas Stadium	64,010
6	October 6	at Green Bay Packers	**W** 20–17	4–2	Milwaukee County Stadium	53,695
7	October 13	Cincinnati Bengals	**W** 35–23	5–2	Texas Stadium	63,275
8	Bye					
9	October 27	at Detroit Lions	**L** 10–34	5–3	Pontiac Silverdome	74,906
10	November 3	**Phoenix Cardinals**	**W** 27–7	6–3	Texas Stadium	61,190
11	November 10	at Houston Oilers	**L** 23–26 (OT)	6–4	Astrodome	63,001
12	November 17	at **New York Giants**	**L** 9–22	6–5	Giants Stadium	76,410
13	November 24	at **Washington Redskins**	**W** 24–21	7–5	RFK Stadium	55,561
14	November 28	Pittsburgh Steelers	**W** 20–10	8–5	Texas Stadium	62,253
15	December 8	New Orleans Saints	**W** 23–14	9–5	Texas Stadium	64,530
16	December 15	at **Philadelphia Eagles**	**W** 25–13	10–5	Veterans Stadium	65,854
17	December 22	Atlanta Falcons	**W** 31–27	11–5	Texas Stadium	60,962
Note: Intra-division opponents are in **bold** text.

=== Game summaries ===
==== Week 6: at Green Bay Packers ====
Week Six: Dallas Cowboys at Green Bay Packers

Quarter	1	2	3	4	Total
Cowboys	0	14	3	3	**20**
**Packers**	0	3	7	7	**17**

at Milwaukee County Stadium, Milwaukee, Wisconsin

- Date: October 6, 1991
- Game time: 12:00 p.m. CST
- Game weather: Overcast, 44 °F (7 °C)
- TV announcers (CBS): James Brown and Randy Cross

Game information

**First quarter**

**Second quarter**

**Third quarter**

**Fourth quarter**

Top passers

- DAL – Troy Aikman – 31/41, 287 yards, TD
- GB – Blair Kiel – 18/35, 212 yards, TD, 2 INT

Top rushers

- DAL – Emmitt Smith – 32 rushes, 122 yards
- GB – Vince Workman – 6 rushes, 22 yards

Top receivers

- DAL – Jay Novacek – 11 receptions, 121 yards, TD
- GB – Sterling Sharpe – 4 receptions, 65 yards, TD

==== Week 14: vs. Pittsburgh Steelers ====
Week forthteen: Pittsburgh Steelers at Dallas Cowboys

Quarter	1	2	3	4	Total
Steelers	0	0	3	7	**10**
**Cowboys**	7	3	0	10	**20**

at Texas Stadium, Irving, Texas

- Date: November 28, 1991
- Game time: 3:00 p.m. CST
- Game weather: Overcast, 68 °F (20 °C)
- Game attendance: 62,253
- TV announcers (NBC): Dick Enberg, Bill Walsh

Game information

**First quarter**

**Second quarter**

**Third quarter**

**Fourth quarter**

Top passers

- PIT – Neil O'Donnell – 17/36, 136 yards
- DAL – Steve Beuerlein – 14/25, 217 yards, TD

Top rushers

- PIT – Warren Williams – 8 rushes, 59 yards, TD
- DAL – Emmitt Smith – 32 rushes, 109 yards, TD

Top receivers

- PIT – Louis Lipps – 5 receptions, 54 yards
- DAL – Michael Irvin – 8 receptions, 157 yards, TD

=== Playoffs ===
Round	Date	Opponent (seed)	Result	Record	Venue
Wild Card	December 29	at Chicago Bears (4)	**W** 17–13	1–0	Soldier Field
Divisional	January 5, 1992	at Detroit Lions (2)	**L** 6–38	1–1	Pontiac Silverdome

=== Standings ===
NFC East
	W	L	T	PCT	DIV	CONF	PF	PA	STK
^{(1)} Washington Redskins	14	2	0	.875	6–2	10–2	485	224	L1
^{(5)} Dallas Cowboys	11	5	0	.688	5–3	8–4	342	310	W5
Philadelphia Eagles	10	6	0	.625	5–3	6–6	285	244	W1
New York Giants	8	8	0	.500	3–5	5–7	281	297	W1
Phoenix Cardinals	4	12	0	.250	1–7	3–11	196	344	L8

== Playoffs ==
Amid making the playoffs for the first time since 1985, there was controversy at the quarterback position. Troy Aikman was considered healthy enough to return for the playoffs. However, Beuerlein hadn't lost as a starter and there was an argument for "riding the hot hand". The "hot hand" argument won and Jimmy Johnson made the decision to play Beuerlein in the wildcard playoff game against the Chicago Bears, and the Cowboys won a hard-fought 17–13 decision at Soldier Field. It was the team's first playoff win since 1982 and first road playoff win since 1980.

After the Chicago win, some thought the Cowboys were Super Bowl contenders (since they had beaten the NFC favorite Redskins at RFK Stadium during the regular season, there was a belief they could do it again if they met the Redskins in the NFC Championship game). However, the Cowboys would first have to beat Detroit at the Silverdome, where the Lions had not lost in 1991.

Heading into the Detroit game, the QB controversy continued as the Cowboys prepared for their divisional playoff game. Pressure was mounting to return Aikman to the lineup but Beuerlein was announced as the starter. Beuerlein started but Aikman would replace him late in the first half with the Cowboys trailing 17–6. The other main issue in the Detroit game was stopping the Lions' running back Barry Sanders, one of the great players in the NFL. When the game began, the Cowboys defense did an excellent job stopping Sanders, holding him to one of his lowest outputs of the season. However, the Cowboys were torched by unheralded Lions quarterback Erik Kramer through the air, resulting in the final score being 38–6 in favor of Detroit.

=== NFC Wild Card ===
Dallas Cowboys 17, Chicago Bears 13

Quarter	1	2	3	4	Total
Cowboys	10	0	7	0	17
Bears	0	3	3	7	13

at Soldier Field, Chicago

- Game time: 12:30 p.m. EST/11:30 p.m. CST
- Game weather: 34 °F (1 °C), partly cloudy
- Game attendance: 62,594
- Referee: Dick Hantak
- TV announcers (CBS): Pat Summerall and John Madden

=== NFC Divisional Playoff ===
Detroit Lions 38, Dallas Cowboys 6

Quarter	1	2	3	4	Total
Cowboys	3	3	0	0	6
Lions	7	10	14	7	38

at Pontiac Silverdome, Pontiac, Michigan

- Game time: 4:00 p.m. EST
- Game weather: Played indoors, domed stadium
- Game attendance: 79,835
- Referee: Gordon McCarter
- TV announcers (CBS): Pat Summerall and John Madden

== Publications ==
- The Football Encyclopedia ISBN 0-312-11435-4
- Total Football ISBN 0-06-270170-3
- Cowboys Have Always Been My Heroes ISBN 0-446-51950-2
