= 1994 Dallas Cowboys season =

NFL team season

- Owner: Jerry Jones
- General manager: Jerry Jones
- Head coach: Barry Switzer
- Offensive coordinator: Ernie Zampese
- Defensive coordinator: Butch Davis
- Home stadium: Texas Stadium

Results
- Record: 12–4
- Division place: 1st NFC East
- Playoffs: Won Divisional Playoffs (vs. Packers) 35–9; Lost NFC Championship (at 49ers) 28–38
- Pro Bowlers: QB Troy Aikman; RB Emmitt Smith; FB Daryl Johnston; WR Michael Irvin; TE Jay Novacek; OL Nate Newton; OL Mark Stepnoski; OL Mark Tuinei; DL Charles Haley; DL Leon Lett; S Darren Woodson

Uniform
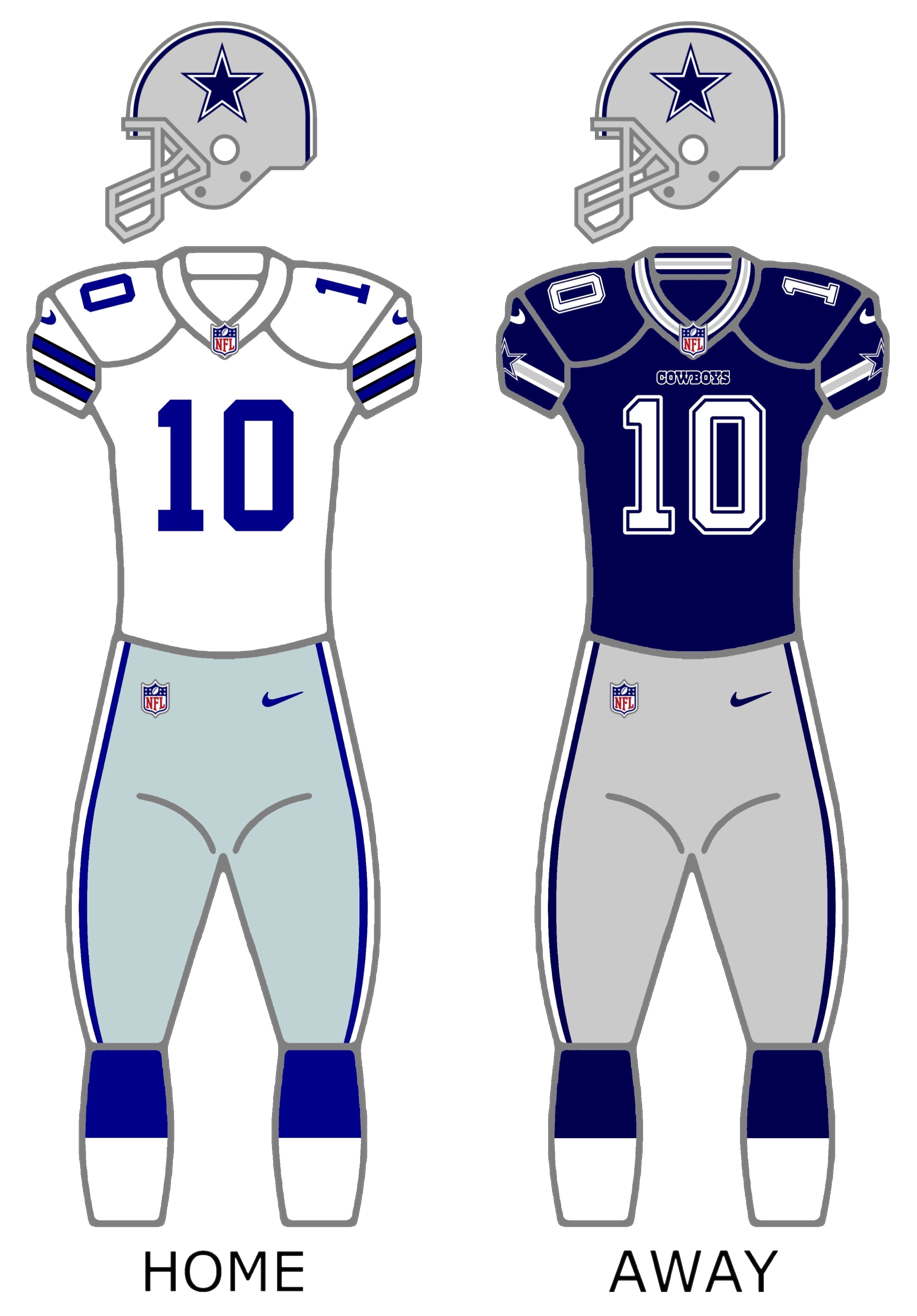

The 1994 Dallas Cowboys season was the franchise's 35th season in the National Football League (NFL). Following their second consecutive Super Bowl title, the Cowboys would see a multitude of changes. In March, months of setbacks finally reached its climax as team owner Jerry Jones and head coach Jimmy Johnson held a press conference and announced Johnson's resignation.

After a run of dominance in the regular season and finishing with a record of 12–4, the Cowboys fell short of a record third straight Super Bowl title with a loss to the eventual Super Bowl champion San Francisco 49ers in the NFC Championship Game, ending their hopes of becoming the first NFL team to three-peat in the Super Bowl. The 1994 Cowboys draft yielded only one notable addition to the team, offensive guard Larry Allen. Veteran linebacker Ken Norton Jr. left the team to sign with San Francisco.

This season was the 75th anniversary of the NFL and was designated by a diamond-shaped patch worn on the left breast of every NFL team's uniform. The Cowboys celebrated the league's history by donning their inaugural white jerseys from the 1960–1963 seasons against the Detroit Lions. The team also later debuted a special white "Double-Star" jersey on Thanksgiving Day 1994. These uniforms celebrated the Cowboys' most recent back-to-back Super Bowl titles in the 1992 and 1993 seasons and were used in most of the Cowboys' remaining games of the season, including the playoffs.

== Offseason ==
Additions	Subtractions
QB Rodney Peete (Lions)	K Eddie Murray (Eagles)
	S Thomas Everett (Buccaneers)
	QB Bernie Kosar (Dolphins)
	G John Gesek (Redskins)
	G Kevin Gogan (Raiders)
	LB Ken Norton Jr. (49ers)
	DT Tony Casillas (Chiefs)

=== NFL draft ===
1994 Dallas Cowboys draft
Round	Pick	Player	Position	College	Notes
1	23	Shante Carver	Defensive end	Arizona State	
2	46	Larry Allen ^{†}	Guard	Sonoma State	
3	102	George Hegamin	Tackle	NC State	
4	109	Willie Jackson	Wide receiver	Florida	
4	131	DeWayne Dotson	Linebacker	Ole Miss	
6	191	Darren Studstill	Safety	West Virginia	
7	216	Toddrick McIntosh	Defensive end	Florida State	
Made roster † Pro Football Hall of Fame * Made at least one Pro Bowl during career

=== Undrafted free agents ===
1994 undrafted free agents of note
Player	Position	College
Chris Boniol	Kicker	Louisiana Tech
Richie Cunningham	Kicker	Louisiana-Lafayette
Matt Joyce	Tackle	Richmond
Mark Mason	Running back	Maryland
Hurvin McCormack	Defensive Tackle	Indiana
Tony Richardson	Fullback	Auburn
Jeff Wilkins	Kicker	Youngstown State
Jermaine Younger	Linebacker	Utah State

== Roster ==
Dallas Cowboys 1994 roster
Quarterbacks: 8 Troy Aikman; 17 Jason Garrett; 9 Rodney Peete; Running backs: 34 Tommie Agee; 44 Lincoln Coleman FB; 48 Daryl Johnston FB; 22 Emmitt Smith; 32 Blair Thomas; Wide receivers: 82 Cory Fleming; 80 Alvin Harper; 88 Michael Irvin; 83 Willie Jackson; 85 Kevin Williams KR/PR; Tight ends: 89 Scott Galbraith; 84 Jay Novacek	Offensive linemen: 73 Larry Allen T; 69 George Hegamin T; 60 Derek Kennard G; 61 Nate Newton G; 76 Jerry Reynolds T; 53 Mark Stepnoski C; 65 Ron Stone G; 71 Mark Tuinei T; Defensive linemen: 96 Shante Carver DE; 94 Charles Haley DE; 95 Chad Hennings DT; 77 Jim Jeffcoat DE; 78 Leon Lett DT; 67 Russell Maryland DT; 99 Hurvin McCormack DT; 92 Tony Tolbert DE	Linebackers: 50 Darrick Brownlow MLB; 58 Dixon Edwards OLB; 55 Robert Jones MLB; 98 Godfrey Myles OLB; 52 Jim Schwantz OLB; 59 Darrin Smith OLB; 91 Matt Vanderbeek MLB; Defensive backs: 40 Bill Bates SS; 24 Larry Brown CB; 46 Joe Fishback FS; 29 Kenneth Gant SS; 47 Clayton Holmes CB; 31 Brock Marion FS; 26 Kevin Smith CB; 30 Darren Studstill FS; 41 Dave Thomas CB; 37 James Washington FS; 28 Darren Woodson SS; Special teams: 18 Chris Boniol K; 70 Dale Hellestrae LS; 19 John Jett P	Reserve lists: 25 Derrick Lassic RB (IR); 79 Erik Williams T (NF-Inj.); Practice squad: 87 John Davis TE; 35 Tony Richardson FB; 75 Matt Joyce G; Rookies in italics 52 active, 2 inactive, 3 practice squad

== Regular season ==
In an attempt to be the first NFL franchise to "Three-Peat" Super Bowls, the Dallas Cowboys were off to a strong start under new head coach Barry Switzer. Offensive coordinator Norv Turner had departed to become head coach of the rival Washington Redskins and was replaced by veteran offensive assistant Ernie Zampese. However dominant, the team was fielded with injuries to many key starters. The most notable injuries were a near fatal car accident to tackle Erik Williams and a nagging hamstring strain to running back Emmitt Smith. The season also saw the brief emergence of back-up quarterback and future head coach Jason Garrett as he led a comeback victory against the Green Bay Packers on Thanksgiving Day by leading the Cowboys to score 36 points in the second half. Dallas finished the regular season posting a 12–4 record and winning the NFC East.

=== Schedule ===
Week	Date	Opponent	Result	Record	Venue	Recap
1	September 4	at Pittsburgh Steelers	**W** 26–9	1–0	Three Rivers Stadium	Recap
2	September 11	Houston Oilers	**W** 20–17	2–0	Texas Stadium	Recap
3	September 19	Detroit Lions	**L** 17–20 (OT)	2–1	Texas Stadium	Recap
4	Bye					
5	October 2	at **Washington Redskins**	**W** 34–7	3–1	RFK Stadium	Recap
6	October 9	**Arizona Cardinals**	**W** 38–3	4–1	Texas Stadium	Recap
7	October 16	**Philadelphia Eagles**	**W** 24–13	5–1	Texas Stadium	Recap
8	October 23	at **Arizona Cardinals**	**W** 28–21	6–1	Sun Devil Stadium	Recap
9	October 30	at Cincinnati Bengals	**W** 23–20	7–1	Riverfront Stadium	Recap
10	November 7	**New York Giants**	**W** 38–10	8–1	Texas Stadium	Recap
11	November 13	at San Francisco 49ers	**L** 14–21	8–2	Candlestick Park	Recap
12	November 20	**Washington Redskins**	**W** 31–7	9–2	Texas Stadium	Recap
13	November 24	Green Bay Packers	**W** 42–31	10–2	Texas Stadium	Recap
14	December 4	at **Philadelphia Eagles**	**W** 31–19	11–2	Veterans Stadium	Recap
15	December 10	Cleveland Browns	**L** 14–19	11–3	Texas Stadium	Recap
16	December 19	at New Orleans Saints	**W** 24–16	12–3	Louisiana Superdome	Recap
17	December 24	at **New York Giants**	**L** 10–15	12–4	Giants Stadium	Recap
Note: Intra-division opponents are in **bold** text.

=== Game summaries ===
==== Week One at Pittsburgh Steelers ====
Barry Switzer's debut as Cowboys head coach was a 26–9 victory over the Steelers and third-year coach Bill Cowher. Undrafted kicker Chris Boniol kicked four field goals while the Steelers managed a Neil O'Donnell touchdown run and a field goal. Despite the lopsided win, Michael Irvin said afterward, "We did not look sharp."

==== Week Two vs. Houston Oilers ====
Dallas's home opener was a 20–17 win over their in-state AFC cousin the Houston Oilers. Though the Oilers closed to within 20–17 they got no further. It would be the final time the Cowboys would face an NFL team from Houston until Week 1 of 2002 vs the Houston Texans.

==== Monday Night Football vs. Detroit Lions ====
The Cowboys struggled against the Lions, falling behind 17–7, but rallied to tie the game. Lions' kicker Jason Hanson missed a short field goal attempt ending regulation, then in overtime another Hanson kick was blocked. Troy Aikman fumbled to the Lions and Hanson booted a 44-yarder for the 20–17 Lions win.

==== Week 5 at Washington Redskins ====
The Cowboys came off their bye week and their former offensive coordinator Norv Turner saw his Redskins get hammered 34–7 at RFK Stadium. The Skins lost four turnovers and managed just 110 yards of offense.

==== Week 6 vs. Arizona Cardinals ====
The Cardinals were obliterated at Texas Stadium 38–3 as quarterbacks Steve Beuerlein and Jay Schroeder were intercepted five total times.

==== Week 7 vs. Philadelphia Eagles ====
With both teams at 4–1 the Cowboys took care of business in a 24–13 win. Randall Cunningham was intercepted four times.

==== Week 8 at Arizona Cardinals ====
The Cardinals had long given little reason for confidence but this game was radically different. Troy Aikman completed three passes and a touchdown to Alvin Harper but was knocked out by a vicious hit from Wilber Marshall. The Cardinals led 21–14 in the fourth but Rodney Peete completed 186 passing yards and two scoring drives for the 28–21 win. Arriving home, several players including Erik Williams went to a bar to relax. Seriously drunk, Williams drove away, then was seriously injured in a vicious highway accident, missing the remainder of the season.

==== Week 9 at Cincinnati Bengals ====
Bengals coach Dave Shula was disliked by Cowboys players during his time on Jimmy Johnson's staff as a young offensive coach because of his mistrust of players and resultant dumbed-down play-calling. His Bengals entered this game winless and stayed that way after the Cowboys rallied from down 20–17 in the third quarter on two Boniol field goals.

==== Monday Night Football vs. New York Giants ====
The Cowboys led wire to wire in a 38–10 rout of the 3–6 Giants, out gaining them in yards 450–188 despite two fumbles. The game was marred by a scuffle between the two teams at the end of the first half.

==== Week 11 vs. San Francisco 49ers ====
Considered the game of the year going in, Dallas's fourth meeting in three seasons with the Niners was a defensive struggle with a combined fourteen punts for 592 yards. The Niners clawed out a 14–7 lead in the fourth and the Cowboys stormed to the Niners’ 7 when Aikman was intercepted (his third of the game). The Niners scored again before Dallas raced downfield and scored but could not recover an onside kick. The 21–14 win would mean San Francisco would host a playoff rematch.

==== Week 12 vs. Washington Redskins ====
Despite being out-gained in yardage 313–243 the Cowboys crushed the Redskins 31–7, snagging four interceptions and a fumble. Both teams used three quarterbacks apiece including future Cowboys head coach Jason Garrett.

==== Thanksgiving Day vs. Green Bay Packers ====
With Troy Aikman out with injury, Garrett started against the 6–5 Packers. Green Bay raced to a 24–13 lead before Garrett erupted to two touchdown throws and led two more drives ending in rushing scores. The result was a 42–31 Cowboys win, a year after their embarrassing Thanksgiving loss to Miami.

==== Week 14 at. Philadelphia Eagles ====
After a 7–2 start the Eagles were in free fall at 7–5 and lost again, this time at Veterans Stadium. The Eagles clawed to within 24–19 but Randall Cunningham was intercepted by Darren Woodson at the Cowboys 6 and Woodson finished a 31–19 Cowboys win.

==== Week 15 vs. Cleveland Browns ====
The Cowboys lost any realistic chance at the top seed in the NFC while the Browns closed in on the playoffs in a 19–14 Cleveland win, picking off Aikman twice and adding two Cowboys fumbles. It began a six-game winning streak against the Cowboys by head coach Bill Belichick.

==== Week 16 at New Orleans Saints ====
Dallas secured a playoff bye in a 24–16 win at the Superdome despite two more Aikman interceptions. Jim Everett of the Saints was worse with three picks and the two teams combined for just 517 yards of offense. One of Aikman's interceptions was by Darion Conner, who was notably chased down by rookie offensive lineman Larry Allen.

==== Christmas Eve at New York Giants ====
Dallas rested most of its starters, since winning or losing this game would not affect its seeding in the playoffs. The Cowboys finished with twelve wins while the Giants, in winning 15–10, salvaged a 9–7 record after starting 3–7. The two teams combined for just 437 yards and twelve penalties altogether.

=== Standings ===
NFC East
	W	L	T	PCT	PF	PA	STK
^{(2)} Dallas Cowboys	12	4	0	.750	414	248	L1
New York Giants	9	7	0	.563	279	305	W6
Arizona Cardinals	8	8	0	.500	235	267	L1
Philadelphia Eagles	7	9	0	.438	308	308	L7
Washington Redskins	3	13	0	.188	320	412	W1

==== Throwback weekend games ====
- Dallas: 9/19 (Det)

== Playoffs ==
The Cowboys' 12–4 regular-season record earned them the #2 seed and a first-round bye in the playoffs. They defeated the Green Bay Packers in the divisional-round playoff game at Texas Stadium. They then traveled to Candlestick Park to face the San Francisco 49ers for the third straight time in as many years in the NFC Championship game. Down 21 points in the first quarter, the Cowboys fought back valiantly, but fell short, 38–28.

=== Schedule ===
Round	Date	Opponent (seed)	Result	Record	Venue	Game Recap
Wild Card	First-round bye					
Divisional	January 8, 1995	Green Bay Packers (4)	W 35–9	1–0	Texas Stadium	Recap
NFC Championship	January 15, 1995	San Francisco 49ers (1)	L 28–38	1–1	Candlestick Park	Recap

=== Playoffs summaries ===
==== Divisional Round vs. Green Bay Packers ====
The Cowboys led wire to wire, winning 35–9 as Aikman erupted for 337 yards while Brett Favre completed just eighteen passes and was benched with the game's competitive phase over for Mark Brunell in his final game for the Packers before league expansion sent him to the same Jacksonville Jaguars whose interest in Dallas's previous head coach had helped set off the controversial change of Dallas coaches before the 1994 season.

==== NFC Championship Game at San Francisco 49ers ====
Dallas's run as Super Bowl champions ended in bitter 38–28 fashion as three turnovers in the first eight minutes of action led to 21 Niners points and a 31–14 San Francisco lead at halftime. Aikman managed 380 yards but three interceptions were part of five Dallas turnovers. The most bitter moment came on an encounter between receiver Michael Irvin (targeted 26 times with twelve catches and two touchdowns) and Niners defensive back Deion Sanders that was considered flagrant pass interference but didn't draw a penalty. Team owner Jerry Jones stated afterward "there is nothing we need to change to beat the Forty Niners," but the Cowboys would sign Sanders as a free agent at the start of the following season.

== Awards and records ==
- Charles Haley, Defense, UPI NFC Player of the Year
- Emmitt Smith, Best NFL Player ESPY Award

== Publications ==
The Football Encyclopedia ISBN 0-312-11435-4
Total Football ISBN 0-06-270170-3
Cowboys Have Always Been My Heroes ISBN 0-446-51950-2
