= Dexter Coakley =

American football player (born 1972)

No. 52
- Position: Linebacker

Personal information
- Born: October 20, 1972 (age 54); Mount Pleasant, South Carolina, U.S.
- Listed height: 5 ft 10 in (1.78 m)
- Listed weight: 230 lb (104 kg)

Career information
- High school: Wando (Mount Pleasant)
- College: Appalachian State (1993–1996)
- NFL draft: 1997: 3rd round, 65th overall pick

Career history
- Dallas Cowboys (1997–2004); St. Louis Rams (2005–2006)

Awards and highlights
- 3× Pro Bowl (1999, 2001, 2003); PFWA All-Rookie Team (1997); 2× Buck Buchanan Award (1995, 1996); 3× First-team NCAA Division I-AA All-American (1993–1996); 3× SoCon Defensive Player of the Year (1994–1996); 2× SoCon Male Athlete of the Year (1995, 1996); SoCon Freshman of the Year (1993); 3× First-team All-SoCon (1993–1996); Appalachian State Mountaineers No. 32 retired

Career NFL statistics
- Tackles: 796
- Sacks: 9.5
- Forced fumbles: 6
- Fumble recoveries: 6
- Interceptions: 13
- Interception yards: 274
- Pass deflections: 38
- Defensive touchdowns: 5
- Stats at Pro Football Reference
- College Football Hall of Fame

William Dexter Coakley (born October 20, 1972) is an American former professional football player who was a linebacker for ten seasons in the National Football League (NFL). He played college football in Division I-AA for the Appalachian State Mountaineers, and was selected in the third round of the 1997 NFL draft by the Dallas Cowboys. Coakley was elected to the College Football Hall of Fame in 2011, making him Appalachian State's first inductee.

== Early life ==
Coakley graduated from Wando High School, where he earned four letters in football. He was the team's Most Valuable Player twice and was twice named all-conference as a safety, after posting 295 tackles in his final two years. Coakley was a running back in football as well and also lettered in wrestling.

== College career ==
In order to meet academic requirements for College, Coakley attended Fork Union Military Academy's post-graduate program for one year, before accepting a scholarship to Appalachian State University.

While at Appalachian State University he grew bigger and was switched to linebacker, becoming the first two-time winner of the Buck Buchanan Awards, given each year to the nation's top Division I-AA defensive player. He was a critical part of the defense on the 1995 Mountaineer team that finished the season unbeaten and untied.

Coakley was named All-American and Southern Conference Defensive Player of the Year as a sophomore, junior and senior, becoming the first player ever to accomplish this feat. He was also the Southern Conference's Athlete of the Year as a junior and senior, marking just the seventh time in conference history that one individual had earned that distinction in consecutive years.

His numerous accolades include being second all-time in tackles in Southern Conference history and breaking the all-time solo tackles (616) and sacks records at Appalachian State University, where his jersey number is retired. He earned a degree in communications and advertising.

In 2011, he was inducted into the College Football Hall of Fame and the Southern Conference Hall of Fame.

== Professional career ==
Pre-draft measurables
Height	Weight	Arm length	Hand span	40-yard dash	10-yard split	20-yard split	20-yard shuttle	Three-cone drill	Vertical jump	Broad jump	Bench press
5 ft 9 5/8 in (1.77 m)	215 lb (98 kg)	32 1/2 in (0.83 m)	9 3/4 in (0.25 m)	4.52 s	1.62 s	2.66 s	4.21 s	7.48 s	38.0 in (0.97 m)	10 ft 5 in (3.18 m)	21 reps
All values from NFL Combine

=== Dallas Cowboys ===
Coakley was selected by the Dallas Cowboys in the third round (65th overall) of the 1997 NFL draft, after dropping because he was considered an undersized linebacker with a small college background.

He became the starter at weakside linebacker as a rookie in preseason, after competing with second-year player Alan Campos and would never relinquish the position, registering 136 tackles, 10 tackles for loss (led the team), one interception and one fumble returned for a touchdown. At the end of the season, he was named to the NFL All-Rookie team. His speed and athleticism allowed him to become a playmaker in Cowboys defenses that were built around speed and pursuit.

In 1999, he made 131 tackles and intercepted four passes, becoming the first Cowboys linebacker to go to the Pro Bowl since Ken Norton Jr. in 1993. Coakley also received the NFL's "All Iron MVP" award during that year's Thanksgiving Day game.

In the 90's, the Cowboys organization felt they could find linebackers through the draft, without the need of paying a premium and adversely impacting the salary cap, so they allowed talented and productive players like Ken Norton Jr, Darrin Smith, Dixon Edwards, Robert Jones and Randall Godfrey, to leave via free agency, instead of signing them into long-term contracts. This philosophy ended when the Cowboys re-signed Coakley to a six-year contract extension in 2001.

In 2002, he led the team with 173 tackles. While Coakley started all 16 games in 2004, he shared significant time with second year linebacker Bradie James, finishing the year with a career-low 91 tackles (60 solo), ending a streak of seven consecutive 100-tackle seasons. He also had 6 quarterback pressures and 5 passes defensed. At the end of the 2004 season he was released because of salary cap considerations and a switch to a 3–4 defense, which is designed for bigger and taller linebackers.

His string of seven consecutive 100-tackle seasons is a franchise record. In addition, he reached double figures in tackles 37 times in 95 career regular season games. He earned Pro Bowl honors in 1999, 2001 and 2003.

During his eight seasons with the Cowboys, he was a very durable player starting 127 out of 128 games, his only missed game was midway through the 2001 season because of a sprained knee. Coakley is tied with Dennis Thurman and DaRon Bland for the club record for defensive touchdowns with five, coming on fumble (one) and interception (four) returns. He is the fourth leading tackler in franchise history with 1,046.

=== St. Louis Rams ===
One day after being released by the Cowboys, he was signed to a five-year contract, by the St. Louis Rams for nearly double the salary he was getting in Dallas, with a signing bonus of $14 million. Coakley was a starter in 2005, registering 42 tackles, two sacks, and one interception in 12 games for the Rams, before suffering a season-ending fractured fibula and a dislocated ankle.

In 2006, he finished with 37 tackles and two interceptions as a backup, starting five games in place of the injured starter Pisa Tinoisamoa. He was released by the Rams in 2007.

=== NFL statistics ===
Year	Team	Games	Combined tackles	Tackles	Assisted tackles	Sacks	Forced fumbles	Fumble recoveries	Fumble return yards	Interceptions	Interception return yards	Yards per interception return	Longest interception return	Interceptions returned for touchdown	Passes defended
1997	DAL	16	92	69	23	2.5	1	1	0	1	6	6	6	0	3
1998	DAL	16	73	55	18	2.0	0	1	0	1	18	18	18	0	5
1999	DAL	16	77	61	16	1.0	1	0	0	4	119	30	46	1	6
2000	DAL	16	87	75	12	0.0	0	1	0	0	0	0	0	0	3
2001	DAL	15	96	73	23	0.0	2	1	0	2	39	20	29	2	5
2002	DAL	16	108	84	24	1.0	0	1	0	1	52	52	52	1	8
2003	DAL	16	96	73	23	1.0	1	0	0	1	24	24	24	0	6
2004	DAL	16	71	53	18	0.0	0	1	0	0	0	0	0	0	5
2005	STL	12	38	28	10	2.0	0	0	0	1	16	16	16	0	2
2006	STL	16	29	26	3	0.0	0	0	0	2	0	0	0	0	4
Career		155	767	597	170	9.5	5	6	0	13	274	21	52	4	47

== Personal life ==
Coakley's son Zahn is a freshman wide receiver at his father's alma mater Appalachian State.

He is now the linebackers coach at The Oakridge School in Arlington, Texas, along with fellow former NFL player Carlos Francis.
