= Godfrey Myles =

American football player (1968–2011)

No. 98, 52
- Position: Linebacker

Personal information
- Born: September 22, 1968; Miami, Florida, U.S.
- Died: June 10, 2011 (aged 42); Miami, Florida, U.S.
- Listed height: 6 ft 1 in (1.85 m)
- Listed weight: 240 lb (109 kg)

Career information
- High school: Miami Carol City
- College: Florida
- NFL draft: 1991: 3rd round, 62nd overall pick

Career history
- Dallas Cowboys (1991–1996); Denver Broncos (1997)*
- * Offseason or practice squad member only

Awards and highlights
- 3× Super Bowl champion (XXVII, XXVIII, XXX); Second-team All-SEC (1990)

Career NFL statistics
- Tackles: 135
- Interceptions: 2
- Fumbles recovered: 2
- Stats at Pro Football Reference

Godfrey Clarence Myles (September 22, 1968 – June 10, 2011) was an American professional football linebacker in the National Football League (NFL) for the Dallas Cowboys. He played college football at the University of Florida.

== Early life ==
Myles attended Miami Carol City High School in Miami Gardens. As a senior in 1986, he was a second-team All-state and All-County linebacker, helping the football team reach the section 4-5A championship game. As a senior, He also ran the 100-meter, 200-meter and anchored the 400-meter relay team.

As a junior, he won the 100 and 200 county and district competitions and also finished second in the 100-meter 5A state meet. Myles and his friend Tim Paulk who were teammates in football, insisted that they were a package deal for any school recruiting them.

== College career ==
Myles accepted a football scholarship from the University of Florida, where he played for coach Galen Hall and coach Steve Spurrier's Florida Gators football teams from 1987 to 1990.

A score of 14 on the ACT (one point under the then-required 15), cost him a year of college eligibility while he was academically ineligible. As a sophomore, he played at outside linebacker in the first 8 games and at strong safety the rest of the season. He finished with 22 tackles and started in the last game.

As a junior, after being tried at inside linebacker and strong safety, he started 8 games at outside linebacker, recording 51 tackles (5 for loss), 3 interceptions (tied for the team lead), 4 passes defensed, 2 forced fumbles and one fumble recovery.

Because he was a superb athlete with excellent size and speed, when defensive coordinator Jim Bates installed a 4-4-3 defense in 1990, Myles was moved to the "Gatorback" hybrid position, that combined the functions of an outside linebacker with a strong safety. He started 11 games, posting 69 tackles (third on the team), 3.5 sacks (third on the team), 10 tackles for loss and 4 passes defensed.

After Myles graduated it was difficult to find a replacement with his combination of skills, so the responsibilities of the position were scaled back and eventually it was discontinued.

== Professional career ==
=== Dallas Cowboys ===
Myles was selected by the Dallas Cowboys in the third round (62nd overall) of the 1991 NFL draft. As a rookie, he was limited in the preseason with pain in his right shoulder, caused by a screw, from a surgery while at college, that was too long and tore at the muscle. He played in the first 4 games, before being placed on the injured reserve list on September 25.

In 1992, he was Ken Norton's backup at strongside linebacker, playing mostly on passing downs, while registering 21 defensive tackles, 9 special teams tackles, 2 quarterback pressures, one pass defensed and one interception. He was the starter at outside linebacker in Super Bowl XXVII when he suffered a freak injury, tearing the anterior cruciate ligament in his right knee during a touchdown celebration, after he was shoved from behind, slipped and twisted his right knee.

In 1993, the recovery process from his injury took him until week 9 against the Philadelphia Eagles to return. He was a backup at strongside linebacker behind Dixon Edwards and tallied 17 tackles. It has been speculated that he was never the same player after the injury.

In 1994, he competed for the middle linebacker position after Norton left in free agency, but the job went to Robert Jones. He was a backup to all three linebacker positions, collecting 13 tackles and one quarterback pressure. During the NFC championship game, he was forced into early action after Edwards was lost with a dislocated shoulder.

In 1995, with Darrin Smith holding out for most of the season, he started the first 7 games at weakside linebacker and 4 games at middle linebacker in place of an injured Jones. He finished third on the team with 99 tackles, while playing through a separated shoulder and helping the team win Super Bowl XXX.

Myles returned to the Cowboys for his final season in 1996, but his playing time was reduced and he never started again. In his six-season NFL career with the Cowboys, he was overshadowed by other players and was mainly used as a backup linebacker and special teams player. During that period the team won three Super Bowls (XXVII, XXVIII, XXX), and he finished with 135 tackles and two interceptions.

=== Denver Broncos ===
On April 15, 1997, he was signed as a free agent by the Denver Broncos. He was waived on August 20.

== Personal life ==
Myles suffered a massive heart attack on June 8, 2011, and expired when his family decided to remove life support, after he had been declared brain dead on June 9, 2011. He died in the early morning of June 10, 2011; he was 42 years old.

== See also ==
- Florida Gators football, 1980–89
- Florida Gators football, 1990–99
- List of Dallas Cowboys players
- List of Florida Gators in the NFL draft
