= Vi Jones =

American gridiron football player (born 1998)

- Jones with the Toronto Argonauts in 2026

No. 46 – Toronto Argonauts
- Position: Linebacker
- CFL status: American

Personal information
- Born: May 5, 1998 (age 28); Austin, Texas, U.S.
- Listed height: 6 ft 2 in (1.88 m)
- Listed weight: 225 lb (102 kg)

Career information
- High school: Westlake (Austin)
- College: USC (2017–2018); NC State (2019–2021)
- NFL draft: 2022: undrafted

Career history
- Seattle Seahawks (2022); Tampa Bay Buccaneers (2023–2024); Arizona Cardinals (2024–2025); Saskatchewan Roughriders (2026)*; Hamilton Tiger-Cats (2026)*; Toronto Argonauts (2026–present)
- * Offseason or practice squad member only

Career NFL statistics
- Total tackles: 9
- Forced fumbles: 2
- Stats at Pro Football Reference

Levi Jones (born May 5, 1998) is an American professional football linebacker for the Toronto Argonauts of the Canadian Football League (CFL). He played college football for the USC Trojans before transferring to the NC State Wolfpack and was signed by the Seattle Seahawks as an undrafted free agent in 2022.

== Professional career ==
Pre-draft measurables
Height	Weight	Arm length	Hand span	40-yard dash	10-yard split	20-yard split	20-yard shuttle	Three-cone drill	Vertical jump	Broad jump	Bench press
6 ft 2 3/4 in (1.90 m)	225 lb (102 kg)	33 in (0.84 m)	9 3/8 in (0.24 m)	4.52 s	1.57 s	2.60 s	4.31 s	6.93 s	36.0 in (0.91 m)	10 ft 6 in (3.20 m)	11 reps
All values from Pro Day

=== Seattle Seahawks ===
After going unselected in the 2022 NFL draft, the Seattle Seahawks signed Jones as an undrafted free agent. He was waived at the final roster cuts, on August 30, 2022, and signed to the Seahawks' practice squad the next day.

Jones was elevated to the active roster on November 12. He made his professional debut the next day against the Tampa Bay Buccaneers in the Seahawks' week 10 game, appearing in 10 special teams snaps. The Seahawks placed Jones back on the practice squad the next day. He was later elevated again to the active roster, playing in the Seahawks' week 13 and 14 games, while being placed back on the practice squad between the games. Jones was elevated to the active roster for the final time on December 31. He played, in total, three games for the Seahawks in 2022.

On August 29, 2023, Jones was waived by the Seahawks.

=== Tampa Bay Buccaneers ===
On November 22, 2023, Jones was signed to the Buccaneers practice squad. He was released on December 12. Jones was re-signed to the practice squad on December 19. He was released on January 10, 2024. He signed a reserve/future contract on January 30, 2024.

Jones was waived by the Buccaneers on August 27, 2024, and re-signed to the practice squad. He was promoted to the active roster on November 29.

=== Arizona Cardinals ===
On December 30, 2024, Jones was claimed off waivers by the Arizona Cardinals.

On August 25, 2025, Jones was waived by the Cardinals.

=== Saskatchewan Roughriders ===
On January 28, 2026, Jones was signed by the Saskatchewan Roughriders of the Canadian Football League (CFL). He was released on May 30 as part of final roster cuts.

=== Hamilton Tiger-Cats ===
On August 18, 2026, Jones signed with the Hamilton Tiger-Cats. On October 10, he was released.

=== Toronto Argonauts ===
On October 19, 2026, it was announced that Jones had signed with the Toronto Argonauts.

== Personal life ==
Jones' is the son of Robert Jones, a linebacker who played 10 seasons in the NFL. He is the younger brother of Zay Jones, a wide receiver for the Arizona Cardinals, and former Minnesota Vikings wide receiver Cayleb Jones. He is also the nephew of former NFL quarterback Jeff Blake.
