= Alan Campos =

American football player (born 1973)

No. 57, 59
- Position: Linebacker

Personal information
- Born: March 3, 1973 (age 53); Miami, Florida, U.S.
- Listed height: 6 ft 3 in (1.91 m)
- Listed weight: 236 lb (107 kg)

Career information
- High school: Pinecrest (FL) Miami Palmetto
- College: Louisville
- NFL draft: 1996: 5th round, 167th overall pick

Career history
- Dallas Cowboys (1996); Indianapolis Colts (1998)*; Scottish Claymores (1998-1999); Carolina Panthers (1999)*; Carolina Cobras (2000)
- * Offseason or practice squad member only

Career NFL statistics
- Tackles: 1
- Stats at Pro Football Reference
- Stats at ArenaFan.com

Alan Raul Campos (born March 3, 1973) is an American former professional football player who was a linebacker for the Dallas Cowboys of the National Football League (NFL). He played college football for the Louisville Cardinals.

== Early life ==
Campos attended Miami Palmetto High School, graduating in 1991. As a senior defensive lineman, he registered 70 tackles, while helping the team to a 9–3 record, a district championship and receiving All-Dade County honors. He accepted a football scholarship from the University of Louisville. In his first two seasons he played mainly on special teams.

As a junior, he became a starter at outside linebacker, posting 123 tackles (second on the team), 2 sacks, one interception, 2 forced fumbles and 3 fumble recoveries (one returned for a 23-yard touchdown). Against the United States Naval Academy, he made 22 tackles.

As a senior; he was the starter at strongside linebacker, finishing with 97 tackles (second on the team), 55 solo tackles, 2 sacks, 9 passes defensed, 3 forced fumbles and 3 interceptions (one returned for a 20-yard touchdown). Against the University of North Carolina, he had 15 tackles and rushed for 70 yards after executing a fake punt.

== Professional career ==
=== Dallas Cowboys ===
Campos was selected by the Dallas Cowboys in the fifth round (167th overall) of the 1996 NFL draft. As a rookie, he was a reserve player and tallied 9 special teams tackles (eighth on the team).

In 1997, he competed with rookie Dexter Coakley for the weakside linebacker starter role, that was available after Darrin Smith left in free agency. On August 25, he was waived to make room for cornerback Deion Sanders under the salary cap.

=== Indianapolis Colts ===
On July 29, 1998, Campos signed with the Indianapolis Colts as a free agent. He was waived on August 24.

=== Carolina Panthers ===
On July 13, 1999, he signed with the Carolina Panthers as a free agent. He was waived on September 3.

=== Scottish Claymores ===
Campos played with the Scottish Claymores of NFL Europe, where he was as a reserve linebacker during two seasons. He registered 9 tackles and one sack in 1998 and 2 sacks in 1999.

=== Carolina Cobras ===
In 2000, Campos signed with the Carolina Cobras of the Arena Football League to play as a fullback/linebacker. Although he was not activated in the regular season until week 6, he finished tied for the team lead with 7 rushing touchdowns. He was released on April 9, 2001.
