= Sean Scott (linebacker) =

NFL player

No. 52
- Position: Linebacker

Personal information
- Born: April 10, 1966; Washington, D.C., U.S.
- Listed height: 6 ft 1 in (1.85 m)
- Listed weight: 226 lb (103 kg)

Career information
- High school: Archbishop Riordan High School
- College: University of Maryland

Career history
- Dallas Cowboys (1988)
- Stats at Pro Football Reference

Sean Scott is a former NFL player who played in five games with the Dallas Cowboys.

== Career ==
Scott attended the University of Maryland. In 1988, Scott signed with the Dallas Cowboys. He played in five games.
