= Eric Hurt =

American football player (born 1957)

No. 40
- Position: Defensive back

Personal information
- Born: June 11, 1957 (age 69); Compton, California, U.S.
- Listed height: 5 ft 11 in (1.80 m)
- Listed weight: 171 lb (78 kg)

Career information
- High school: Compton
- College: San Jose State
- NFL draft: 1980: undrafted

Career history
- Dallas Cowboys (1980)

Career NFL statistics
- Games played: 4
- Stats at Pro Football Reference

Eric Hurt (born June 11, 1957) is an American former professional football player who was a defensive back for the Dallas Cowboys of the National Football League (NFL) in 1980. He played college football for the San Jose State Spartans.
