= Bruce Livingston =

Australian cricketer

Personal information
- Born: 11 May 1927; Sydney, Australia
- Died: 25 December 2014 (aged 87); Sydney, Australia
- Source: ESPNcricinfo, 5 January 2017

Bruce Livingston (11 May 1927 – 25 December 2014) was an Australian cricketer. He played one first-class match for New South Wales in 1956/57. He also played for Petersham-Marrickville Cricket Club and took four wickets for 36 runs against Balmain in 1954. He also played for Dogura in Papua New Guinea and was captain of the Ellis Shield team. He was also an umpire and a member of the Papua New Guinea Cricket Board of Control. He also played soccer and was president of the Port Moresby Football Association in 1971.

== See also ==
- List of New South Wales representative cricketers
