= Tony Hill (defensive end) =

American gridiron football player (born 1968)

No. 90, 94
- Position: Defensive end

Personal information
- Born: October 23, 1968 (age 58); Augusta, Georgia, U.S.
- Listed height: 6 ft 6 in (1.98 m)
- Listed weight: 250 lb (113 kg)

Career information
- High school: Warren County (Warrenton, Georgia)
- College: Chattanooga
- NFL draft: 1991: 4th round, 108th overall pick

Career history
- Dallas Cowboys (1991–1992); Tampa Bay Buccaneers (1994)*; Winnipeg Blue Bombers (1994–1996)
- * Offseason or practice squad member only

Awards and highlights
- Super Bowl champion (XXVII); Division I-AA All-American (1990); All-SoCon (1990); Second-team All-SoCon (1989)

Career NFL statistics
- Games played: 13
- Stats at Pro Football Reference

Antonio LaVosia Hill (born October 23, 1968) is an American former professional football player who was a defensive end in the National Football League (NFL) for the Dallas Cowboys. He also played for the Winnipeg Blue Bombers of the Canadian Football League (CFL). He played college football for the Chattanooga Mocs. With the Cowboys, he won Super Bowl XXVII over the Buffalo Bills.

== Early life ==
Hill attended Warren County High School in Warrenton, Georgia. He played in the Florida-Georgia and the North-South All-star football games. He was also named second-team All-state in basketball.

In track and field he placed third in the discus throw in the state finals. As a senior, he won the state shot put title and placed fourth in the high jump.

== College career ==
Hill accepted a football scholarship from the University of Tennessee at Chattanooga. As a freshman, he only played in 5 games because of a stress fracture in his right foot.

As a sophomore, he started eight of the nine contests he played, missing the final 2 because of a right dislocated shoulder. In the 33–10 win against East Tennessee State University, he made a career-high 11 tackles, 2 sacks, 3 quarterback pressures, 3 tackles for loss and forced one of the school-record 7 interceptions.

As a junior, he started every game and led the team in sacks despite a deep thigh bruise that kept him out of practices. Against the Citadel College, he had 11 tackles, one tackle for loss, one quarterback pressure and 2 forced fumbles.

As a senior, although he was limited with an injured left shoulder late in the season, he received All-Conference and Division I-AA All-American honors. He finished his college career with 187 tackles, 13 sacks (school record), 30 tackles for loss, 7 passes defensed and 6 blocked kicks.

== Professional career ==
=== Dallas Cowboys ===
Hill was selected by the Dallas Cowboys in the fourth round (108th overall) of the 1991 NFL draft. He led the team in tackles and sacks and tied for the team lead in tackles for loss during the preseason. In the season opener against the Cleveland Browns he re-aggravated a left shoulder injury from his previous season in college and was placed on the injured reserve list on September 14. He was activated for the eleventh game of the season against the Houston Oilers. He played in the wild card playoff game against the Chicago Bears, where he defended a pass and recovered a Jim Harbaugh fumble that contributed to a 17–13 win.

On September 2, 1992, he was placed on the injured reserve list with a right hamstring injury. He was activated on September 28, but suffered a strained right hamstring in the ninth game against the Philadelphia Eagles and missed the remainder of the regular season. He was activated for the playoffs, becoming a member of the Super Bowl XXVII winning team. He was waived injured on August 29, 1993.

=== Tampa Bay Buccaneers ===
In 1994, he was signed as a free agent by the Tampa Bay Buccaneers. He was released on August 23.

=== Winnipeg Blue Bombers ===
In 1994, he signed with the Winnipeg Blue Bombers of the Canadian Football League, where he played for three seasons.
