= Hurvin McCormack =

American football player (born 1972)

No. 99
- Position: Defensive tackle

Personal information
- Born: April 6, 1972 (age 54); Brooklyn, New York, U.S.
- Listed height: 6 ft 5 in (1.96 m)
- Listed weight: 281 lb (127 kg)

Career information
- High school: New Dorp
- College: Indiana
- NFL draft: 1994: undrafted
- Expansion draft: 1999: 1st round, 2nd overall pick

Career history
- Dallas Cowboys (1994–1998); Cleveland Browns (1999)

Awards and highlights
- Super Bowl champion (XXX); First-team All-Big Ten (1993)

Career NFL statistics
- Total tackles: 87
- Sacks: 12
- Forced fumbles: 2
- Fumble recoveries: 1
- Stats at Pro Football Reference

Hurvin Michael McCormack (born April 6, 1972) is an American former professional football player who was a defensive tackle in the National Football League (NFL) for the Dallas Cowboys and the Cleveland Browns. He played college football for the Indiana Hoosiers.

== Early life ==
McCormack attended New Dorp High School where he played. As a senior, he tallied 58 tackles and 8 sacks, on his way to being named All-conference, All- Staten Island and All-district.

He accepted a football scholarship from Indiana University Bloomington. As a sophomore, he started 11 games at defensive tackle and had 32 tackles. As a junior, he posted 36 tackles (ninth on the team), 23 solo tackles, 6 sacks and 8 tackles for loss.

As a senior, he appeared in only 9 games, recording 38 tackles (26 solo), 7 sacks and 9 tackles for loss. He finished his college career with 114 tackles and 16 sacks, which ranked fourth in school history at the time.

== Professional career ==
=== Dallas Cowboys ===
McCormack was signed as an undrafted free agent by the Dallas Cowboys after the 1994 NFL draft. He appeared in 4 games as a rookie, collecting one quarterback sack.

In 1995, he was moved to defensive end during training camp. In the regular season, he played both at defensive end and defensive tackle. His first start came in place of an injured Russell Maryland in the ninth game against the Philadelphia Eagles, posting 6 tackles (5 solo), one sack and 2 quarterback pressures. His second start came in the fifteenth game against the New York Giants, making 3 solo tackles and one quarterback pressure. He finished the season with 22 tackles, 2 sacks, 2 tackles for loss and 9 quarterback pressures. He tore his right posterior cruciate ligament late in Super Bowl XXX, while moving in for a sack.

In 1996, he started 3 games at right defensive end in place of an injured Charles Haley and one game at right defensive tackle to compensate for an injured Chad Hennings. He registered 21 tackles, 2.5 sacks and 11 quarterback pressures (sixth on the team). He had rotator cuff surgery on his right shoulder at the end of the season.

In 1997, he made 19 tackles, 0.5 sacks, one tackle for loss and 8 quarterback pressures (third on the team). He was declared inactive for the last 3 games of the season.

In 1998, he ranked second on the team with 5 sacks. He was left unprotected in the 1999 NFL expansion draft.

=== Cleveland Browns ===
McCormack was the second overall pick by the Cleveland Browns in the 1999 NFL expansion draft. He started four games in the season that the Browns returned to the National Football League. He wasn't re-signed at the end of the year.

== Personal life ==
McCormack has three children (Myles, Milani, and Davin). He is currently the VP for the NFLPA NY/NJ Chapter.
