= Vince Albritton =

American football player (born 1962)

No. 36
- Position: Safety

Personal information
- Born: July 23, 1962 (age 64); Oakland, California, U.S.
- Listed height: 6 ft 2 in (1.88 m)
- Listed weight: 215 lb (98 kg)

Career information
- High school: McClymonds (Oakland)
- College: Washington
- NFL draft: 1984: undrafted

Career history
- Dallas Cowboys (1984–1991)

Awards and highlights
- Second-team All-Pac-10 (1983)

Career NFL statistics
- Interceptions: 1
- Fumble recoveries: 7
- Sacks: 3
- Stats at Pro Football Reference

Vince Denader Albritton (born July 23, 1962) is an American former professional football player who was a safety for the Dallas Cowboys of the National Football League (NFL). He played college football for the Washington Huskies.

== Early life ==
Albritton attended McClymonds High School, where he focused mainly on baseball. As a senior in football, he set a school record with 8 interceptions, received All-OAL honors and helped his team win the Oakland Athletic League.

He accepted a football scholarship from the University of Washington. He played in the same defensive backfield with future NFL players Vince Newsome and Ray Horton. He became a starter at strong safety until his senior season and led the secondary in tackles.

== Professional career ==
Albritton was selected by the Philadelphia Stars in the sixteenth round (329th overall) of the 1984 USFL draft. Although he wasn't selected in the 1984 NFL draft, he opted to sign as an undrafted free agent with the Dallas Cowboys. As a rookie, he was first tried at linebacker before being moved to strong safety.

On August 20, 1985, he was placed on the injured reserve list with a pulled hamstring he injured in the preseason, returning later in the season to play linebacker in the last 7 games. The next year, he was moved back to safety and played linebacker only in passing situations, registering 42 tackles and 2 fumble recoveries.

In 1987, he posted 35 tackles, with 11 coming in the last game against the St. Louis Cardinals. He also was named the Cowboys special teams player of the year.

In 1988, he suffered a bruised left thigh in the preseason game against the Oakland Raiders and was placed on the injured reserve list until October 28. During the season he injured his right thigh and missed 2 additional contests. He played in six games, making 18 tackles and 2 sacks.

Albritton was mainly used as a special teams player until 1989, when he earned the starting strong safety job over Bill Bates and finished with 111 tackles (third on the team), 4 passes defensed, 5 quarterback pressures, one interception and 2 forced fumbles.

The next year after starting 8 games at strong safety and being on track to register career-high numbers, he suffered a bruise right quad and was placed on the injured reserve list on November 29. He led the secondary with 63 tackles, including 16 against the New York Giants. He also had 6 passes defensed and 2 fumble recoveries.

Albritton was waived on August 26, 1991, only to be re-signed one day later. After suffering a broken left forearm, he was placed on the injured reserve list on October 11. He was released on July 8, 1992.

Injuries affected his career, after being able to play in only 3 full seasons.
