= Stan Smagala =

American football player (born 1968)

No. 42
- Position: Safety

Personal information
- Born: April 6, 1968 (age 58); Chicago, Illinois, U.S.
- Listed height: 5 ft 10 in (1.78 m)
- Listed weight: 184 lb (83 kg)

Career information
- High school: Burbank (IL) St. Laurence
- College: Notre Dame
- NFL draft: 1990: 5th round, 123rd overall pick

Career history
- Dallas Cowboys (1990–1991); Pittsburgh Steelers (1992)

Career NFL statistics
- Games played: 11
- Stats at Pro Football Reference

Stanley Adam Smagala (born April 6, 1968) is an American former professional football player who was a safety in the National Football League (NFL) for the Dallas Cowboys and Pittsburgh Steelers. He played college football for the Notre Dame Fighting Irish.

== Early life ==
Smagala grew up in Chicago, Illinois, and attended St. Laurence High School, where he practiced football, wrestling and track. The summer before his senior year, he attended a football camp held by the University of Notre Dame, where he tied the camp record for the fastest 40-yard dash.

As a senior running back, he posted 140 carries for 900 rushing yards and received All-city honors. He also rushed for 300 yards and three touchdowns in a playoff game.

== College career ==
Smagala accepted a football scholarship from the University of Notre Dame. Although he had never played the position before, he was converted into a cornerback because he was considered small for a running back.

Even though head coach Lou Holtz tried to convince him to transfer to another school, as a sophomore he was the team's second fastest player (4.35 seconds in the 40-yard dash) behind wide receiver Tim Brown and became a three-year starter at right cornerback. As a junior, he was paired at cornerback with Todd Lyght.

Due to the teams Notre Dame played, Smagala was required to cover wide receivers like Andre Rison, Michael Irvin, Brian Blades, Brett Perriman, Reggie Rembert and Greg McMurtry.

His most famous play was a 64-yard interception return for a touchdown against the number 2 ranked University of Southern California in 1988. He also helped the team win a national championship and achieve a school-record 23-game winning streak.

== Professional career ==
=== Los Angeles Raiders ===
Smagala was selected by the Los Angeles Raiders in the fifth round (123rd overall) of the 1990 NFL draft, but was immediately traded to the Dallas Cowboys in exchange for a sixth round (#158-James Williams), eighth round (#197-Arthur Jimerson), ninth round (#230-Leon Perry), tenth round (#259-Jim Szymanski) and an eleventh round (#304-Myron Jones) draft choice.

=== Dallas Cowboys ===
On September 23, 1990, he suffered a broken left forearm while helping force a fumble against the Washington Redskins and was placed on the injured reserve list. In that game, he also saw action at strong safety. He finished the season with 2 special teams tackles and one quarterback pressure.

He was waived on August 26, 1991. On October 17, he was re-signed to replace first-year player Donald Smith. He appeared in 8 games, playing mainly on special teams and making 8 tackles.

=== Pittsburgh Steelers ===
On April 2, 1992, the Pittsburgh Steelers signed Smagala as a Plan B free agent. He was placed on the injured reserve list with a knee injury on September 1. He was released on August 22, 1993.

== Personal life ==
After football, he worked for a Real Estate Development company.
