= Dixon Edwards =

American football player (born 1968)

No. 58, 59
- Position: Linebacker

Personal information
- Born: March 25, 1968 (age 58); Cincinnati, Ohio, U.S.
- Listed height: 6 ft 1 in (1.85 m)
- Listed weight: 230 lb (104 kg)

Career information
- High school: Aiken (Cincinnati)
- College: Michigan State
- NFL draft: 1991: 2nd round, 37th overall pick

Career history
- Dallas Cowboys (1991–1995); Minnesota Vikings (1996–1998); Miami Dolphins (1999)*
- * Offseason or practice squad member only

Awards and highlights
- 3× Super Bowl champion (XXVII, XXVIII, XXX); Second-team All-Big Ten (1990)

Career NFL statistics
- Tackles: 438
- Fumble recoveries: 4
- Sacks: 7.5
- Stats at Pro Football Reference

Dixon Voldean Edwards, III (born March 25, 1968) is an American former professional football player who was a linebacker in the National Football League (NFL) for the Dallas Cowboys and Minnesota Vikings. He played college football for the Michigan State Spartans.

== Early life ==
Edwards attended Aiken High School in Cincinnati, Ohio, where he earned All-district honors as a tight end and defensive tackle.

He accepted a football scholarship from Michigan State University, where he studied Construction Management. He was a backup during his first 2 seasons.

As a junior in 1989, in his first season as a starter at weakside linebacker, he finished second on the team in tackles (111) to All-American Percy Snow and tied for the team lead in tackles for loss (11), earning an All-Big Ten honorable-mention. He had 14 tackles against the University of Miami, 13 against the University of Michigan and 14 against the University of Iowa.

As a senior, he had 112 tackles (7 for loss), 2 sacks, one pass defensed, 2 forced fumbles and 2 fumble recoveries. Edwards led the Spartans with a single-game career-high 16 tackles in their upset of then-No. 1 ranked University of Michigan. He earned second-team All-Big Ten honors at the end of the year.

During his college career, he registered 254 career tackles, 18 tackles for loss, 4 passes defensed and 4 sacks, while helping the Spartans to a 31-14-1 record, two Big Ten titles and a 3-1 bowl game record (including the 1988 Rose Bowl win).

== Professional career ==
=== Dallas Cowboys ===
Edwards was selected by the Dallas Cowboys in the second round (37th overall) of the 1991 NFL draft. Because of his speed and hitting ability, he was moved to strongside linebacker, even though he had a small frame at 6-1 and 225 pounds. On September 25, he was activated from the injured reserve list. He played mainly on special teams and tied for fourth on the team with 10 tackles. The next year, he was second on the team with 15 special teams tackles.

In 1993, he became the starter at strongside linebacker after Vinson Smith was traded to the Chicago Bears on August 17. He posted 82 tackles (seventh on the team), 1.5 sacks, one quarterback pressure and 12 special teams tackles. He saw limited action in Super Bowl XXVIII because the Cowboys kept 5 defensive backs on the field for most of the contest.

In 1994, he recorded 104 tackles (third on the team), 5 tackles for loss, one sack, 2 quarterback pressures, 3 passes defensed and 9 special teams tackles (tenth on the team). He dislocated his right shoulder in the first quarter of the NFC Championship Game against the San Francisco 49ers and was replaced with Godfrey Myles.

In 1995, he was third on the team with 109 tackles.

In the 90's, the Cowboys organization felt they could find linebackers through the draft, without the need of paying a premium and adversely impacting the salary cap, so they allowed talented and productive players like him, Ken Norton, Jr., Darrin Smith, Robert Jones and Randall Godfrey, to leave via free agency, instead of signing them to long-term contracts.

During his 5 seasons with the Cowboys, Edwards helped the team win 3 Super Bowls, playing as a starter in Super Bowl XXVIII and Super Bowl XXX. In 1996 after he left as a free agent, the Cowboys replaced him by signing Broderick Thomas.

=== Minnesota Vikings ===
On February 25, 1996, Edwards signed as a free agent with the Minnesota Vikings, replacing Broderick Thomas and becoming the Vikings highest paid linebacker in franchise history. During training camp Ed McDaniel was injured, so the team was forced to move him to weakside linebacker, where he would have the best year of his career with 122 tackles, 3.5 sacks and one interception.

In 1997, he was moved back to the strongside linebacker position, where his production began to decline.

On June 2, 1999, he was released for salary cap reasons. In his three years with the Vikings, Edwards started 43 of the 45 games, made 250 tackles, 5 sacks, one interception, 7 passes defensed, 3 forced fumbles and 2 fumble recoveries.

=== Miami Dolphins ===
On June 21, 1999, the Miami Dolphins signed him to a one-year contract, to add depth and experience at the outside linebacker position, while reuniting him with Jimmy Johnson. In training camp he was diagnosed with an irregular heartbeat and although he was medically cleared, he decided to stop playing and was released before the season started on August 4.

Edwards appeared in 120 regular season games in his career, starting 90 of them. His NFL career statistics include 573 tackles, 7.5 sacks, two interceptions for 54 yards and a touchdown, four fumble recoveries, seven forced fumbles and 19 passes defensed. He also had 50 special teams tackles.

== NFL career statistics ==
Legend
	Won the Super Bowl
**Bold**	Career high

=== Regular season ===
Year	Team	Games		Tackles				Interceptions				Fumbles			
Year	Team	GP	GS	Comb	Solo	Ast	Sck	Int	Yds	TD	Lng	FF	FR	Yds	TD
1991	DAL	11	1	18	18	0	0.0	**1**	**36**	**1**	**36**	0	0	0	0
1992	DAL	**16**	1	10	10	0	0.0	0	0	0	0	0	0	0	0
1993	DAL	**16**	15	82	**82**	0	1.5	0	0	0	0	**2**	**1**	0	0
1994	DAL	**16**	15	74	59	15	1.0	0	0	0	0	1	**1**	21	0
1995	DAL	15	15	62	47	15	0.0	0	0	0	0	0	0	0	0
1996	MIN	14	13	**96**	68	**28**	**3.5**	**1**	18	0	18	0	0	0	0
1997	MIN	**16**	**16**	50	34	16	1.5	0	0	0	0	**2**	**1**	0	0
1998	MIN	15	14	46	29	17	0.0	0	0	0	0	1	**1**	0	0
		119	90	438	347	91	7.5	2	54	1	36	6	4	21	0

=== Playoffs ===
Year	Team	Games		Tackles				Interceptions				Fumbles			
Year	Team	GP	GS	Comb	Solo	Ast	Sck	Int	Yds	TD	Lng	FF	FR	Yds	TD
1991	DAL	2	0	0	0	0	0.0	0	0	0	0	0	0	0	0
1992	DAL	**3**	0	3	3	0	0.0	0	0	0	0	0	**1**	0	0
1993	DAL	**3**	**2**	0	0	0	0.0	0	0	0	0	0	0	0	0
1994	DAL	2	**2**	3	2	1	0.0	0	0	0	0	0	0	0	0
1995	DAL	**3**	**2**	5	**5**	0	0.0	0	0	0	0	0	0	0	0
1996	MIN	1	1	4	3	1	0.0	0	0	0	0	0	0	0	0
1997	MIN	2	**2**	4	2	**2**	0.0	0	0	0	0	0	0	0	0
1998	MIN	2	**2**	**6**	**5**	1	0.0	0	0	0	0	0	0	0	0
		18	11	25	20	5	0.0	0	0	0	0	0	1	0	0

== Personal life ==
On KTCK AM in Dallas, Edwards is known for an interview he did where he said the words "you know" an inordinate number of times to the point where it became unintentionally comedic.
