= Robert Jones (linebacker) =

American football player (born 1969)

No. 55, 52, 50
- Position: Linebacker

Personal information
- Born: September 27, 1969 (age 57); Blackstone, Virginia, U.S.
- Listed height: 6 ft 3 in (1.91 m)
- Listed weight: 245 lb (111 kg)

Career information
- High school: Nottoway Co. (Crewe, Virginia)
- College: East Carolina
- NFL draft: 1992: 1st round, 24th overall pick

Career history
- Dallas Cowboys (1992–1995); St. Louis Rams (1996–1997); Miami Dolphins (1998–2000); Washington Redskins (2001); Houston Texans (2002)*; Green Bay Packers (2002)*
- * Offseason or practice squad member only

Awards and highlights
- 3× Super Bowl champion (XXVII, XXVIII, XXX); PFWA All-Rookie Team (1992); Unanimous All-American (1991); Third-team All-American (1990); Second-team All-South Independent (1989)

Career NFL statistics
- Tackles: 766
- Sacks: 8
- Fumble recoveries: 3
- Interceptions: 3
- Defensive touchdowns: 1
- Stats at Pro Football Reference

Robert Lee Jones (born September 27, 1969) is an American former professional football player who was a linebacker in the National Football League (NFL) for the Dallas Cowboys, St. Louis Rams, Miami Dolphins, and Washington Redskins. He played college football for the East Carolina Pirates football, earning consensus All-American honors. He was selected by the Cowboys in the first round of the 1992 NFL draft with the 24th overall pick.

== Early life ==
Jones attended Nottoway County High School. As a senior, he tallied 120 tackles and helped his team win the 2A state championship. In order to meet the minimum academic requirements for college, Jones studied one year at the Fork Union Military Academy's post-graduate program.

He accepted a football scholarship from East Carolina University and would become the most accomplished linebacker in its history. In 1988, he started 3 out of 10 games, collecting 43 tackles (one for loss), one pass defensed and one forced fumble, receiving Freshman All-American honors.

As a sophomore, he was a regular starter at inside linebacker, recording 117 tackles (led the team), 4 tackles for loss, one sack, 3 passes defensed and one forced fumble. He made 16 tackles against both Louisiana Tech University and the University of Southern Mississippi.

As a junior, he posted 167 tackles (second in school history), 2 interceptions, 3 tackles for loss, 3 passes defensed, one forced fumble and one fumble recovery. Against Temple University, he had 23 tackles. Against the University of Southern Mississippi, he made 17 tackles, returned an interception for a touchdown and blocked a field goal.

He was a co-captain of the 1991 team that finished ranked No. 9 nationally with a 12–1 record, including a Peach Bowl victory. He finished with 8 quarterback pressures (led the team), 12 tackles for loss, 3 sacks, 4 forced fumbles and 151 tackles, becoming the second player in school history to lead the team three straight seasons. Against Syracuse University, he had 18 tackles (3 for loss) and 3 quarterback pressures. Against Tulane University, he made 15 tackles and one quarterback pressure. Against the University of South Carolina, he had 16 tackles, one interception and a blocked extra-point. He was a consensus All-American choice and one of the finalists for the Butkus award.

In 2004, he was inducted into the East Carolina University Athletics Hall of Fame.

== Professional career ==
Pre-draft measurables
Height	Weight	Arm length	Hand span	40-yard dash	10-yard split	20-yard split	20-yard shuttle	Vertical jump	Broad jump	Bench press
6 ft 1 5/8 in (1.87 m)	236 lb (107 kg)	33 5/8 in (0.85 m)	9 1/2 in (0.24 m)	4.83 s	1.75 s	2.74 s	4.30 s	38.5 in (0.98 m)	10 ft 7 in (3.23 m)	28 reps

=== Dallas Cowboys ===
Jones was selected by the Dallas Cowboys in the first round (24th overall) of the 1992 NFL draft, becoming the first player from East Carolina University to be drafted that high. The team moved Ken Norton Jr. to outside linebacker, allowing him to become the second rookie (Eugene Lockhart) in Cowboys history to start at middle linebacker, and the second rookie (Lee Roy Jordan) linebacker in franchise history to start in a season-opener. He helped the Cowboys establish the top defense in the league in 1992, was named NFC rookie of the year and was selected to the NFL All-rookie team. He started 13 out of 15 games, posting 108 tackles (second on the team), one sack, 2 tackles for loss, 4 quarterback pressures, one pass defensed and one fumble recovery. He had 16 tackles against both the Philadelphia Eagles and Kansas City Chiefs.

In 1993, he started the first 3 games before being benched in favor of Ken Norton Jr., who took over his middle linebacker duties. He collected 36 tackles (2 for loss) and 4 special teams tackles. He had 16 tackles against the Washington Redskins and 11 tackles against the Buffalo Bills.

In 1994, he regained the starting job at middle linebacker after Norton left in free agency. He would come back to have the best year of his career, going on to be selected to the Pro Bowl, after registering 162 tackles (then the fourth-highest single season total in Cowboys history), 2 quarterback pressures, 4 tackles for loss and 3 passes defensed.

In 1995, he was fourth on the team with 100 tackles, despite missing the last 3 games with a strained abdominal muscle. During his four seasons with the Cowboys, Jones helped the Cowboys win Super Bowl XXVII, Super Bowl XXVIII and Super Bowl XXX.

In the 1990s, the Cowboys organization felt they could find linebackers through the draft, without the need of paying a premium and adversely impacting the salary cap, so they allowed talented and productive players like Ken Norton Jr., Darrin Smith, Dixon Edwards, and Randall Godfrey, to leave via free agency, instead of signing them into long-term contracts. After he became a free agent in 1996, the Cowboys replaced him by signing free agent Fred Strickland.

=== St. Louis Rams ===
On March 5, 1996, he signed as a free agent with the St. Louis Rams. In 1997, he led the team with 115 tackles. On June 2, 1998, he was released from the team for salary cap reasons.

=== Miami Dolphins ===
On June 10, 1998, he signed a one-year contract with the Miami Dolphins, reuniting him with Jimmy Johnson. That season, Jones became an integral part of a defense that allowed an NFL low 265 points. He started all 16 regular season games at strongside linebacker and finished third on the team with 100 total tackles. He also put together career-high numbers of five sacks, two interceptions and five passes defensed. He returned one of those interceptions for the first touchdown of his career. After the season, the Dolphins rewarded him with a five-year contract extension.

On March 1, 2001, he was released by the Dolphins after not restructuring his contract.

=== Washington Redskins ===
On June 12, 2001, Jones signed a one-year deal with the Washington Redskins, starting 9 of 15 games during the season.

=== Houston Texans ===
On April 25, 2002, he signed as a free agent with the Houston Texans for the franchise's inaugural year, but upon his request was released before the season started on May 14.

=== Green Bay Packers ===
One week later, he signed with the Green Bay Packers, but was released shortly after to make room for signed free agent Hardy Nickerson.

Over his 10-year career, he played in 151 total games and registered 974 tackles, 8 quarterback sacks and 3 interceptions.

== NFL career statistics ==
Year	Team	GP	Tackles				Fumbles			Interceptions					
Year	Team	GP	Cmb	Solo	Ast	Sck	FF	FR	Yds	Int	Yds	Avg	Lng	TD	PD
1992	DAL	15	108	0	0	1.0	0	1	0	0	0	0.0	0	0	0
1993	DAL	13	19	18	1	0.0	0	0	0	0	0	0.0	0	0	0
1994	DAL	16	118	84	34	0.0	0	1	0	0	0	0.0	0	0	5
1995	DAL	12	72	54	18	1.0	1	0	0	0	0	0.0	0	0	2
1996	STL	16	98	83	15	0.0	0	0	0	1	0	0.0	0	0	4
1997	STL	16	77	60	17	1.0	0	0	0	0	0	0.0	0	0	5
1998	MIA	16	79	52	27	5.0	0	0	0	2	14	7.0	14	1	6
1999	MIA	16	79	58	21	0.0	0	0	0	0	0	0.0	0	0	0
2000	MIA	16	51	33	18	0.0	0	0	0	0	0	0.0	0	0	0
2001	WAS	15	39	31	8	0.0	1	0	0	0	0	0.0	0	0	1
Career		151	632	473	159	8.0	2	2	0	3	14	4.7	14	1	23

== Personal life ==
Robert's wife is Maneesha Jones. Robert's son Cayleb was a wide receiver in the NFL for parts of three seasons. Robert's second son Zay was a wide receiver at East Carolina University and the all-time receptions leader (399) in the history of college football. Zay was drafted by the Buffalo Bills in the second round of the 2017 NFL draft. A third son, Levi, is a linebacker for the Arizona Cardinals. He has 3 daughters: Leah, Priscilla, and Ana.
