= Darrin Smith =

American football player (born 1970)

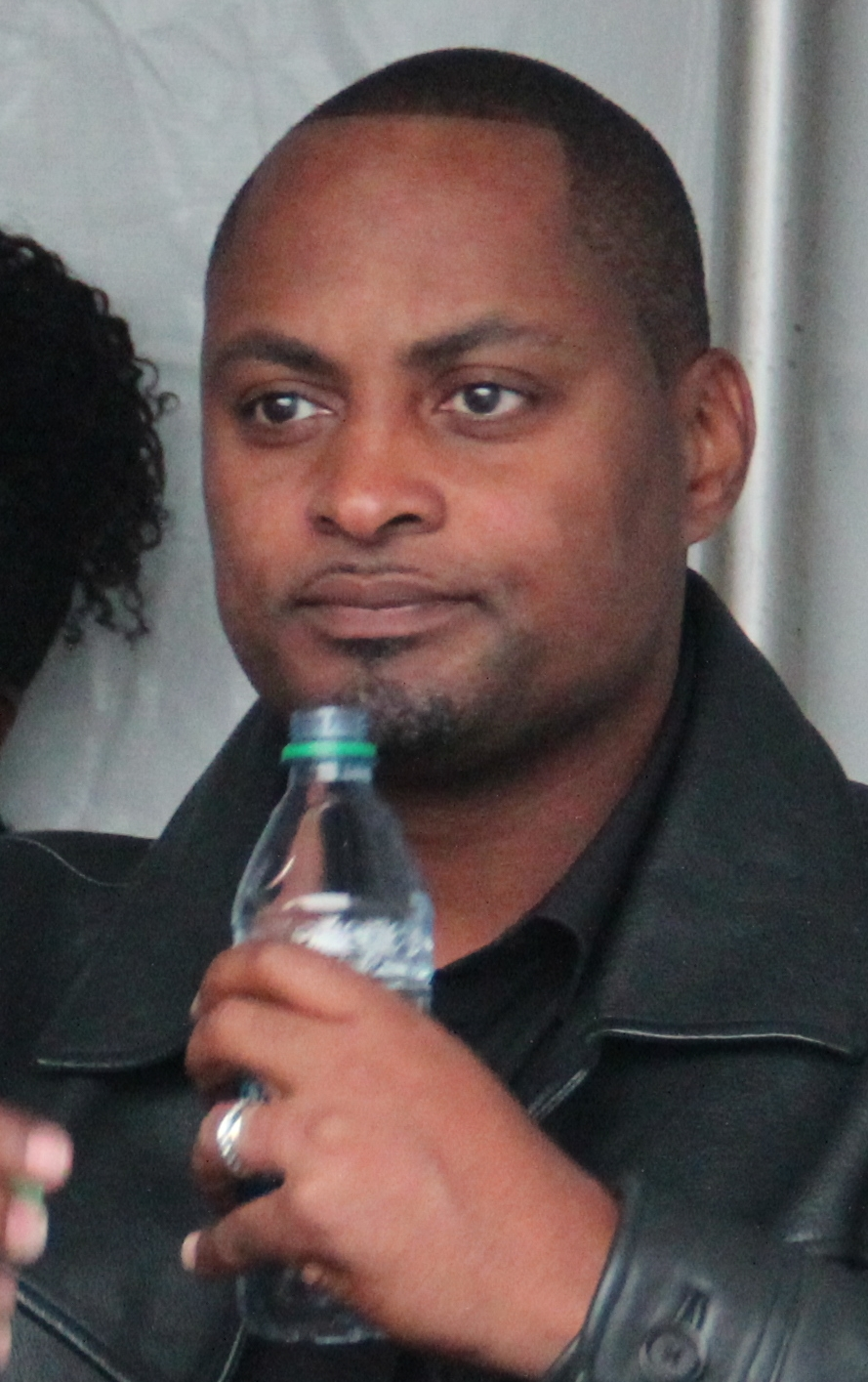
- Smith in 2014

No. 59, 56, 54
- Position: Linebacker

Personal information
- Born: April 15, 1970 (age 56); Miami, Florida, U.S.
- Listed height: 6 ft 1 in (1.85 m)
- Listed weight: 236 lb (107 kg)

Career information
- High school: Miami Norland (Miami Gardens, Florida)
- College: Miami (FL) (1989–1992)
- NFL draft: 1993: 2nd round, 54th overall pick

Career history
- Dallas Cowboys (1993–1996); Philadelphia Eagles (1997); Seattle Seahawks (1998–1999); New Orleans Saints (2000–2004)

Awards and highlights
- 2× Super Bowl champion (XXVIII, XXX); PFWA All-Rookie Team (1993); 2× National champion (1989, 1991); 2× First-team All-American (1991, 1992); Big East co-Defensive Player of the Year (1991); 2× First-team All-Big East (1991, 1992)

Career NFL statistics
- Tackles: 782
- Sacks: 24
- Interceptions: 11
- Stats at Pro Football Reference
- College Football Hall of Fame

Darrin Andrew Smith (born April 15, 1970) is an American former professional football player who was a linebacker in the National Football League (NFL) for the Dallas Cowboys, Philadelphia Eagles, Seattle Seahawks and New Orleans Saints. He played college football for the Miami Hurricanes. He was inducted into the College Football Hall of Fame in 2025.

== Early life ==
Smith attended Miami Norland High School. He was a two-way player as a junior, lining up as a linebacker and a 185-pound pulling guard. In one game he played outside linebacker, offensive tackle, center and guard.

As a senior, he led his team in tackles, receiving All-state honors. He was also a member of the track team, where he competed in the 100 metres with a personal best time of 10.7 seconds.

== College career ==
Smith was a member of the Dennis Erickson's 1989 and 1991 national-championship teams for the University of Miami. He played strongside linebacker, where along with teammates Jessie Armstead (weakside linebacker) and Michael Barrow (middle linebacker), formed arguably one of the greatest linebacking corps in college football history, known as "The Bermuda Triangle".

As a redshirt freshman, he was a backup linebacker tallying 64 tackles (seventh on the team), 8 tackles for loss, 1.5 sacks, 4 quarterback pressures, 3 passes defensed, while contributing on the special teams units that achieved an NCAA season record low of 0.2 yards allowed per punt return. The next year he earned the starter position at strongside linebacker, posting 105 tackles (third on the team), 4 tackles for loss, 3 sacks, 5 quarterback pressures and 8 passes defensed.

As a junior, he led the team with 126 tackles and was named Big East Conference co-defensive player of the year, along with Syracuse University defensive tackle George Rooks. He also had 10 tackles for loss, 3.5 sacks, 5 quarterback pressures, 4 passes defensed and one forced fumble.

As a senior, he registered 106 tackles (second on the team), helping the team achieve a top eight ranking in total defense, while allowing 11.5 points per game. He made 2 sacks, 8 quarterback pressures, 4 tackles for loss, 9 passes defensed, one interception and 2 forced fumbles.

He finished his college career with 401 tackles (fourth in school history). He was a two-time second-team All-American and a Butkus Award semi-finalist. Smith stayed five years at the University of Miami, the first as a red-shirted freshman under Jimmy Johnson, so he could get a complete education. He earned his master's degree in marketing after getting his undergraduate degree in business management. He was the school's first National Football Foundation and College Hall of Fame Scholar-Athlete recipient.

In 2006, he was inducted into the University of Miami Sports Hall of Fame.

== Professional career ==
Pre-draft measurables
Height	Weight	Arm length	Hand span	40-yard dash	10-yard split	20-yard split	20-yard shuttle	Vertical jump	Broad jump	Bench press
6 ft 0 1/2 in (1.84 m)	228 lb (103 kg)	32 1/8 in (0.82 m)	9 3/4 in (0.25 m)	4.55 s	1.59 s	2.67 s	4.26 s	39.0 in (0.99 m)	10 ft 5 in (3.18 m)	22 reps

=== Dallas Cowboys ===
Smith was selected by the Dallas Cowboys in the second round (54th overall) of the 1993 NFL draft. As a rookie, he was named the starter at weakside linebacker in the fourth game of the season against the Green Bay Packers, after Ken Norton Jr. was moved to middle linebacker. He registered 93 tackles (fourth on the team and led NFL rookies), 4 passes defensed, 2 fumble recoveries. His best game came in the seventh game against the Philadelphia Eagles with 14 tackles. He was named to the NFL All-rookie team and was considered one of the fastest linebackers in the league, extremely quick and versatile. He also was a part of the Super Bowl XXVIII winning team.

The next year, he recorded 103 tackles (fourth on the team), 4 sacks (fifth on the team), 10 passes defensed (fifth on the team) and 2 interceptions. He had 15 tackles against the Cleveland Browns.

In 1995, Smith was a restricted free agent and the team gave him a one-year qualifying offer instead of a long-term deal, so he sat out the first 7 games in a contract dispute, in order to avoid injury and be more marketable in free agency. He signed and played in the nine games that were needed for his contract to not be voided for that season. He collected 65 tackles (seventh on the team), 3 sacks and returned a fumble 63 yards (sixth longest in franchise history) against the Kansas City Chiefs. He helped the Cowboys win Super Bowl XXX. In 1996, he signed a one-year contract, posting 117 tackles (third on the team) and one sack.

In the 1990s, the Cowboys organization felt they could find linebackers through the draft, without the need of paying a premium and adversely impacting the salary cap, so they allowed talented and productive players like Ken Norton Jr., Dixon Edwards, Robert Jones and Randall Godfrey, to leave via free agency, instead of signing them into long-term contracts. In 1997, after he became a free agent the Cowboys replaced him by drafting Dexter Coakley.

=== Philadelphia Eagles ===
Although he was looking for a multiyear deal, because that season many teams had salary cap problems, he was forced to sign a one-year contract with the Philadelphia Eagles on April 19, 1997. His time with the team was disappointing after suffering a sprained left ankle in training camp which forced him to miss 3 of the first 5 games. He then had torn ligaments in his right ankle and missed the last 6 contests, which limited him to only 7 games. He was placed on the injured reserve list on November 19. He registered 13 tackles, one sack, one forced fumble and one fumble recovery. He wasn't re-signed after the season.

=== Seattle Seahawks ===
On February 19, 1998, he reunited with Dennis Erickson, signing a contract with the Seattle Seahawks and becoming the starter at strongside linebacker. He collected 80 tackles, 5 sacks (fifth on the team), 3 interceptions (tied for second on the team), 2 forced fumbles and 2 fumble recoveries. He started 12 games, including 3 at middle linebacker because of injuries to Dean Wells and DeShone Myles. He was inactive in 3 games because of injuries.

In 1999, he started 15 games, recording 90 tackles (third on the team), 65 solo tackles, one sack, one interception and 3 passes defensed. On February 10, 2000, he was released because of salary cap reasons.

=== New Orleans Saints ===
On July 16, 2000, he signed a one-year deal with the New Orleans Saints. He began the first 5 games of the season as a backup linebacker. In the sixth game against the Carolina Panthers, although he lacked the ideal size, he became the team's starting middle linebacker at 235 pounds. He used his athletic ability to rank second on the team with 113 tackles, while also adding 2 interceptions (one returned for a touchdown), 21 passes defensed (led the team), 2 sacks and 3 special teams tackles. He became a key contributor for the Saints' defense and the team's run to the NFC Western Division title. He had 12 tackles and 2 passes defensed against the Arizona Cardinals. He made 14 tackles against the San Francisco 49ers. He had 13 tackles and 2 passes defensed against the Oakland Raiders.

On March 29, 2001, he was re-signed to a four-year contract. He started 16 games at right outside linebacker, posting 84 tackles (sixth on the team), 65 solo tackles, 8 passes defensed, 1.5 sacks, one forced fumble and 6 special teams tackles. He had 7 tackles, one sack, one pass defensed and one forced fumble against the Carolina Panthers. He made 11 tackles and one pass defensed against the New York Jets. He had 13 tackles, a half-sack and one pass defensed against the Washington Redskins.

In 2002, he started 15 games at right outside linebacker and was one of the leaders of the defense. He registered 10 or more tackles in 5 contests, while establishing career-highs with 123 tackles (83 solo), 2 interceptions, 3.5 sacks, 11 passes defensed and one fumble recovery. He had 14 tackles, 3 sacks and one pass defensed against the Pittsburgh Steelers. He had 14 sacks and a half-sack against the Minnesota Vikings.

In 2003, he opened the season as the starter at middle linebacker, collecting 11 tackles (3 solo) and one pass defensed against the Seattle Seahawks. In the fifth game against the Carolina Panthers, he was moved as the starter at strongside linebacker, replacing an injured Sedrick Hodge. In the ninth game against the Tampa Bay Buccaneers, he suffered a strained right hamstring in the second quarter. He was declared inactive in the next 2 contests. He was a backup and played on special teams in the last 5 games. He finished with 9 starts, 71 tackles (fifth on the team), 51 solo tackles, one sack, one interception and 6 passes defensed.

He was released on September 5, 2004. He was signed back to provide depth on December 2. He was limited to only 3 games because of injuries and he didn't register any stat. He wasn't re-signed after the season.

Smith played in the NFL for 12 seasons, recording 24 quarterback sacks, 11 interceptions and 4 touchdowns. He never appeared in a Pro Bowl, but he is the only professional football player to earn two College Football National Championship rings (1989 and 1991) and two Super Bowl rings (1993 and 1995).

=== NFL statistics ===
Year	Team	Games		Tackles				Fumbles			Interceptions					
Year	Team	GP	GS	Comb	Solo	Ast	Sacks	FF	FR	Yds	Int	Yds	Avg	Lng	TDs	PDs
1993	DAL	16	13	57	48	9	1.0	0	1	0	0	0	0	0	0	6
1994	DAL	16	16	68	46	22	4.0	0	2	11	2	13	7.5	13	1	7
1995	DAL	9	9	46	40	6	3.0	0	1	63	0	0	0	0	0	2
1996	DAL	16	16	81	54	27	1.0	0	0	0	0	0	0	0	0	0
1997	PHI	7	7	13	9	4	1.0	0	1	0	0	0	0	0	0	3
1998	SEA	13	12	80	59	21	5.0	2	2	0	3	56	18.6	26	2	6
1999	SEA	15	15	90	65	25	1.0	0	0	0	1	0	0	0	0	4
2000	NO	16	16	91	61	30	2.0	0	0	0	2	56	28.0	41	1	9
2001	NO	16	16	67	50	17	1.5	1	0	0	0	0	0	0	0	9
2002	NO	15	15	96	63	33	3.5	0	0	0	2	21	10.5	17	0	8
2003	NO	14	10	60	44	16	1.0	0	0	0	1	9	9.0	9	0	3
2004	NO	3	0	0	0	0	0.0	0	0	0	0	0	0	0	0	0
Career		156	145	749	539	210	24.0	3	7	74	11	155	14.1	41	4	57

== Personal life ==
Smith now owns and operates a real estate investment/development company, As well as being a Youth & High School Football Coach at Chaminade-Madonna (Hollywood, FL). He is a member of The Fountain of Pembroke Pines (Pastor Wayne Lomax) where he heads the Athletes for Christ Bible Study Ministry. He is married to Kimberly Smith and the father of twins, a girl and a boy, Daryn and Darius Smith.
