= Dale Hellestrae =

American football player (born 1962)

No. 62, 70, 71
- Positions: Offensive tackle, center, long snapper

Personal information
- Born: July 11, 1962 (age 64); Phoenix, Arizona, U.S.
- Listed height: 6 ft 5 in (1.96 m)
- Listed weight: 291 lb (132 kg)

Career information
- High school: Saguaro (Scottsdale, Arizona)
- College: SMU
- NFL draft: 1985: 4th round, 112th overall pick

Career history
- Buffalo Bills (1985–1988); Los Angeles Raiders (1989); Dallas Cowboys (1990–2000); Baltimore Ravens (2001)

Awards and highlights
- 3× Super Bowl champion (XXVII, XXVIII, XXX); First-team All-SWC (1984)

Career NFL statistics
- Games played: 205
- Games started: 2
- Stats at Pro Football Reference

Dale Robert Hellestrae (born July 11, 1962) is an American former professional football player who was a long snapper in the National Football League (NFL) for the Buffalo Bills, Dallas Cowboys, and Baltimore Ravens. He played college football for the SMU Mustangs.

== Early life ==
Hellestrae was born in Phoenix, Arizona, as a descendant of Norwegian immigrants; his first name Dale is the name of the area his ancestors came from (Dale, Hordaland), and his second name Hellestrae (Norwegian:Hellestræ) is his ancestors' farm's name.

He attended Saguaro High School, where he was an All-state selection in football and basketball as a senior. After graduation, he spent one year at the Marine Military Academy.

He accepted a football scholarship from Southern Methodist University, where he was a two-year starter at offensive tackle and earned All-Southwest Conference honors as a senior, while playing offensive tackle.

== Professional career ==
=== Buffalo Bills ===
Hellestrae was selected by the Buffalo Bills in the fourth round (112th overall) of the 1985 NFL draft. He was also selected by the Houston Gamblers in the 1985 USFL Territorial Draft. As a rookie, he missed the last 12 games with a broken right thumb. In 1986, he played in the first 2 games before missing the next 8 with a broken navicular bone in his left wrist. In 1987, he was lost for the season after being placed on the injured reserve list with a hip injury.

In 1988, he appeared in all 16 games and he had his only career starts, when he started at right guard in the final two regular season games and in two playoff games. During his four seasons with the team, he could only play in 28 games because of injury problems.

=== Los Angeles Raiders ===
On February 23, 1989, he was signed in Plan B free agency by the Los Angeles Raiders, but spent all of the season on the injured reserve list after breaking the fibula bone and dislocating the ankle in his left leg during training camp. On August 20, 1990, he was traded to the Dallas Cowboys in exchange for a seventh round draft choice (#180-Tripp Welborne).

=== Dallas Cowboys ===
The Dallas Cowboys acquired him with the intention of concentrating on playing long snapper in all of the special teams units and to back up the guard and center positions. During his time with the team he quickly became one of the best long snappers in the NFL and in team history.

In 1992, he had 6 special teams tackles. In 1993, he made 7 special teams tackles. In 1994, he had 5 special teams tackles. In 1997, he posted 5 special teams tackles. In 1998, he had 9 special teams tackles. In 1999, he registered 10 special teams tackles (sixth on the team).

In the 1990s, the Cowboys organization felt they could find placekickers and punters through free agency, without the need of paying a premium and adversely impacting the salary cap, so they allowed talented and productive players to leave, instead of signing them into long-term contracts. In his 11 seasons playing with the Cowboys, Hellestrae had to snap for eight different placekickers and seven punters, while helping the team win 3 Super Bowls.

On March 1, 2001, he was released because of salary cap implications. At the time he was second in franchise history with 176 consecutive games played, behind Bob Lilly.

=== Baltimore Ravens ===
On January 3, 2002, he was signed by the Baltimore Ravens as a free agent to fill in for injured rookie Joe Maese. He played in one regular season game and in two playoff games. He wasn't re-signed at the end of the season.

== Personal life ==
Hellestrae works as a color analyst on professional and NCAA football games, particularly for College Football on Versus. He is also the co-host of The Main Event With Steven McCollum on RobatTV on Mon-Fri mornings At 8 am Arizona Time.

He is also the color analyst for Arizona Rattlers and High School Football on Cox7. He appears as a guest analyst on "Sports Tonight" on KPNX, Channel 12, in Phoenix with co-hosts Kevin Hunt and Bruce Cooper. He is the owner of Cookies By Design, in the Scottsdale area.
