= Ken Norton Jr. =

American football player and coach (born 1966)

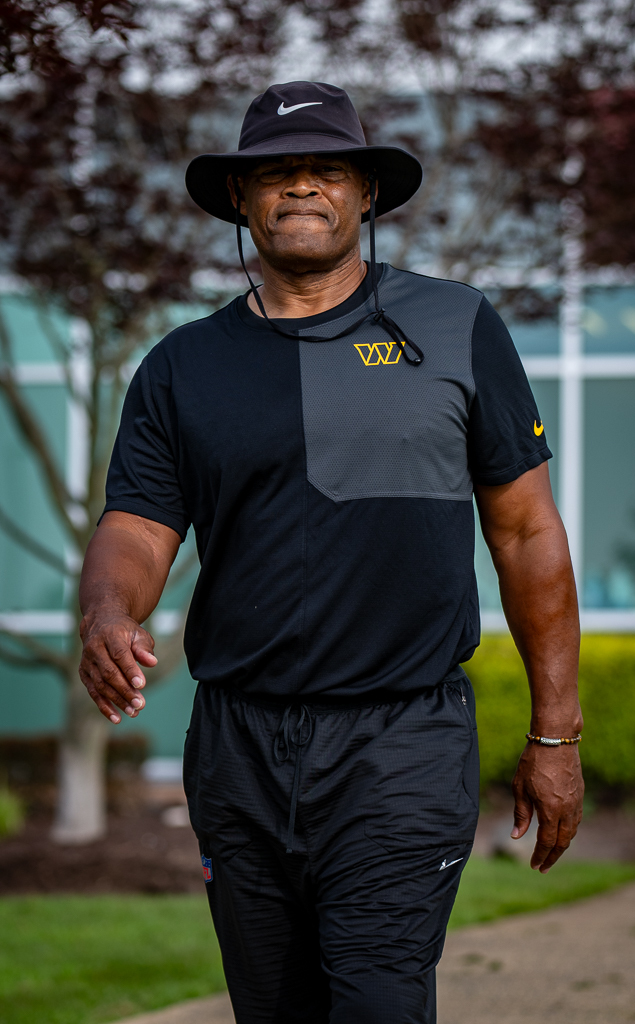
- Norton with the Washington Commanders in 2025

Washington Commanders
- Title: Linebackers coach

Personal information
- Born: September 29, 1966 (age 60); Jacksonville, Illinois, U.S.
- Listed height: 6 ft 2 in (1.88 m)
- Listed weight: 254 lb (115 kg)

Career information
- Position: Linebacker (No. 51)
- High school: Westchester (Los Angeles, California)
- College: UCLA (1984–1987)
- NFL draft: 1988: 2nd round, 41st overall pick

Career history

Playing
- Dallas Cowboys (1988–1993); San Francisco 49ers (1994–2000)

Coaching
- USC Trojans (2004–2009); Linebackers coach (2004–2008); Assistant head coach & linebackers coach (2009); Seattle Seahawks (2010–2014) Linebackers coach; Oakland Raiders (2015–2017) Defensive coordinator; Seattle Seahawks (2018–2021) Defensive coordinator; UCLA Bruins (2022–2023) Linebackers coach; Washington Commanders (2024–present) Linebackers coach

Awards and highlights
- Playing: 3× Super Bowl champion (XXVII, XXVIII, XXIX); First-team All-Pro (1995); Second-team All-Pro (1993); 3× Pro Bowl (1993, 1995, 1997); First-team All-American (1987); First-team All-Pac-10 (1987); Second-team All-Pac-10 (1986); Coaching: Super Bowl champion (XLVIII); AP national champion (2004)

Career NFL statistics
- Tackles: 1,274
- Sacks: 12.5
- Interceptions: 5
- Defensive touchdowns: 2
- Stats at Pro Football Reference
- Coaching profile at Pro Football Reference

Kenneth Howard Norton Jr. (born September 29, 1966) is an American professional football coach and former player who is the linebackers coach for the Washington Commanders of the National Football League (NFL). He played college football as a linebacker for the UCLA Bruins and was selected by the Dallas Cowboys in the second round of the 1988 NFL draft.

Norton is the first player to have won three consecutive Super Bowls during his playing career, doing so with the Cowboys and San Francisco 49ers. Only one other player, Darian Kinnard, has accomplished this feat since; however, Kinnard did so without appearing in any postseason games across his three-year stretch, making Norton the only player to achieve this as a regular starter.

Since retirement, Norton has coached at both the college and professional level. In college, he has worked as the linebackers coach for UCLA and USC, briefly serving as assistant head coach with the latter. At the NFL level, he has previously served as defensive coordinator for the Oakland Raiders and Seattle Seahawks and currently works as the linebackers coach for the Washington Commanders. Norton is the son of the late former world champion boxer Ken Norton.

== Early life ==
Norton is a graduate of Westchester High School in California, where he played as a running back averaging 8.8 yards per carry as a senior.

He went on to play at UCLA from 1984 to 1987, where he was converted to linebacker, the position he would play for the remainder of his football career.

Norton was a member of the 1985 conference championship team, and helped the Bruins to four consecutive bowl game wins. He led the team with 106 tackles in 1986 and 125 in 1987. He ranks sixth in school history with 339 career tackles.

He was named the team's defensive MVP in 1987, earned first-team All-American honors, and was a finalist for the Butkus Award.

Norton was inducted in the UCLA Hall of Fame in 1998.

== Playing career ==
Pre-draft measurables
Height	Weight	Hand span	40-yard dash	10-yard split	20-yard split	20-yard shuttle	Vertical jump	Broad jump	Bench press
6 ft 1 3/4 in (1.87 m)	230 lb (104 kg)	8 1/2 in (0.22 m)	4.56 s	1.60 s	2.65 s	4.37 s	32.0 in (0.81 m)	9 ft 6 in (2.90 m)	21 reps
All values from NFL Combine

=== Dallas Cowboys (1988–1993) ===
Norton was selected in the second round of the 1988 NFL draft by the Dallas Cowboys. He spent most of his rookie year on the injured reserve list with a broken thumb.

In 1989, Norton and Jesse Solomon shared the weakside linebacker position. He played the first and third quarters, Solomon the second and fourth.

In 1990, he became a full-time starter when Solomon held out and was eventually traded to the Tampa Bay Buccaneers. A knee injury sidelined him for the last two games of the season.

In 1991, he bounced back from knee surgery and was used at strongside linebacker and middle linebacker during that season, eventually settling in at the middle linebacker spot.

In 1992, he blossomed as a player and became the leader of the defense, leading the team in tackles with 120 and helping the Cowboys win their first Super Bowl in the 1990s. That year the Cowboys had the number one defense in the league, but no player was voted to the Pro Bowl. He also started doing his trademarked punching of the goal posts or the air, after making good plays. A tribute to his father, the one time boxing heavyweight champion of the world, Ken Norton.

In 1993, he had to play through a torn biceps injury, but still managed to lead the team in tackles with 159, helping the Cowboys win their second straight Super Bowl. He was also selected to his first Pro Bowl. Norton played in Dallas between 1988 and 1993, assisting the Cowboys to victory in Super Bowl XXVII and Super Bowl XXVIII. Norton scored his first career touchdown on a fumble recovery in the fourth quarter of Super Bowl XXVII, helping to seal a Cowboys victory.

In 1994 when a salary cap was instituted in the NFL, the Cowboys organization felt they could find linebackers through the draft, without the need of paying a premium and adversely impacting the salary cap, so they allowed talented and productive players like Darrin Smith, Dixon Edwards, Robert Jones, and Norton to leave via free agency, instead of signing them into long-term contracts.

=== San Francisco 49ers (1994–2000) ===
During the first year of free agency, he joined the San Francisco 49ers from 1994 to 2000. He became the first player to win three consecutive Super Bowls when the 49ers won Super Bowl XXIX, a feat that remained unmatched until 2025, when Philadelphia Eagles offensive linemen Darian Kinard accomplished the same feat - winning two Super Bowls with the Chiefs, and his third with the Eagles. Norton was selected to his second Pro Bowl in 1995. Norton was also named to the NFL All-Pro Team following the 1995 season. Norton is also notable for his part in ending the career of Napoleon McCallum. In the first game of the 1994 season, Norton, along with Bryant Young, tackled McCallum during a rushing play. While he was being pulled to the ground, McCallum's knee collapsed backwards into an unnatural position, almost at a 90-degree angle. After the play, Norton remained under McCallum while medical staff attended to McCallum.

Norton finished his 13 NFL seasons with 12 sacks and 5 interceptions, which he returned for 127 yards and 2 touchdowns (both in the same game against the St. Louis Rams in 1995). He also recovered 13 fumbles and returned them for 36 yards. Along with ex-teammate Deion Sanders, Norton won consecutive Super Bowls on different teams. Years later, LeGarrette Blount and Chris Long would become the third and fourth players to do so.

== Coaching career ==
=== USC Trojans (2004–2009) ===
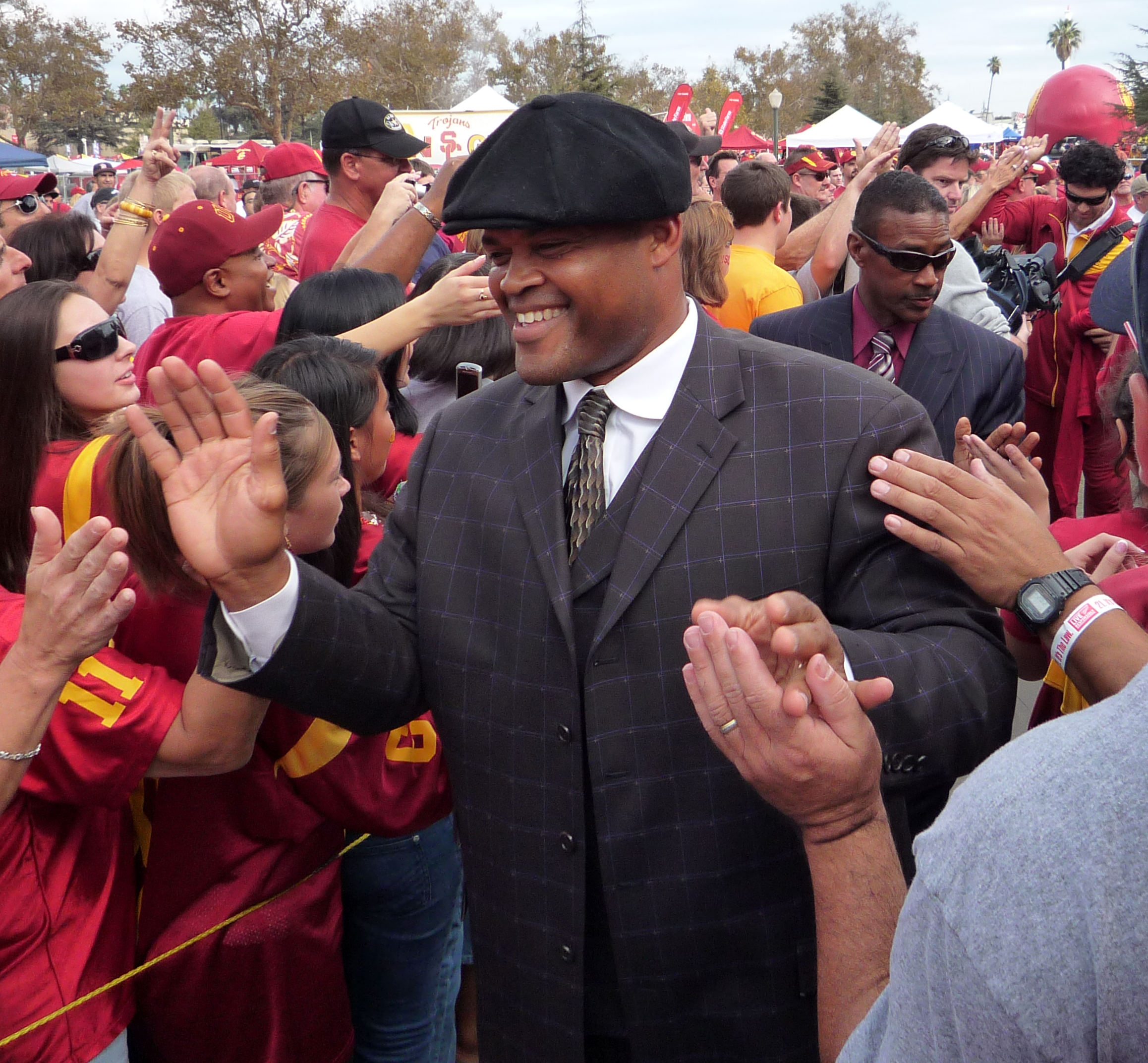
Norton with the USC Trojans in 2008

In 2004, he joined the coaching staff of the USC Trojans football team under Head Coach Pete Carroll. From 2004 to 2009, he served as the linebacker coach for the Trojans; while at USC he helped recruit and develop NFL-bound linebackers such as NFL Pro Bowler Lofa Tatupu, Dallas Sartz, Keith Rivers, Brian Cushing, Kaluka Maiava, Clay Matthews III, and Rey Maualuga.

On January 7, 2009, Norton was promoted to USC Assistant Head Coach for Defense. A form of recognition of his continuing work with the USC linebacker corps, he has developed three consecutive Rose Bowl MVPs: Brian Cushing (2007), Rey Maualuga (2008) and Kaluka Maiava (2009).

Attending the player evaluations of the by-invitation-only 2009 NFL Scouting Combine were all four of Norton's Trojan senior class linebacker protégés: Brian Cushing, Kaluka Maiava, Clay Matthews III, and Rey Maualuga.

=== Seattle Seahawks (2010–2014) ===
On January 11, 2010, it was announced that USC linebackers coach Norton would be joining head coach Pete Carroll in Seattle to fill the same role with the Seahawks, reuniting him with his protégé, Seahawks defensive standout Lofa Tatupu.

Norton would also win his fourth Super Bowl, Super Bowl XLVIII on February 2, 2014, his first as a coach.

Norton was instrumental in the development of the Seattle Seahawks star linebacker group consisting of All-Pro Bobby Wagner, Pro Bowler K.J. Wright, Super Bowl MVP Malcolm Smith, special teams captain Heath Farwell, veteran Leroy Hill, and pass rush specialist Bruce Irvin.

=== Oakland Raiders (2015–2017) ===
On February 6, 2015, he was named the defensive coordinator for the Oakland Raiders. The Raiders also signed Seattle Seahawks outside linebacker Bruce Irvin reuniting him with his former coach.

Under Norton's tutelage, outside linebacker Khalil Mack won the NFL Defensive Player of the Year Award at the end of the 2016 season.

He was fired by head coach Jack Del Rio on November 21, 2017, two days after the Raiders suffered a blowout 33–8 loss to the New England Patriots and the defense having not intercepted a pass in 11 weeks.

=== San Francisco 49ers and Seahawks (2018–2021) ===
On January 8, 2018, he was hired as the 49ers assistant head coach, leaving the position just 1 week later when the Seahawks hired him as defensive coordinator. Norton was fired after the conclusion of the 2021 NFL season lasting 4 seasons in his second stint with the Seahawks.

=== UCLA Bruins (2022–2023) ===
In February 2022, Norton returned to UCLA as linebackers coach under head coach Chip Kelly.

=== Washington Commanders (2024–present) ===
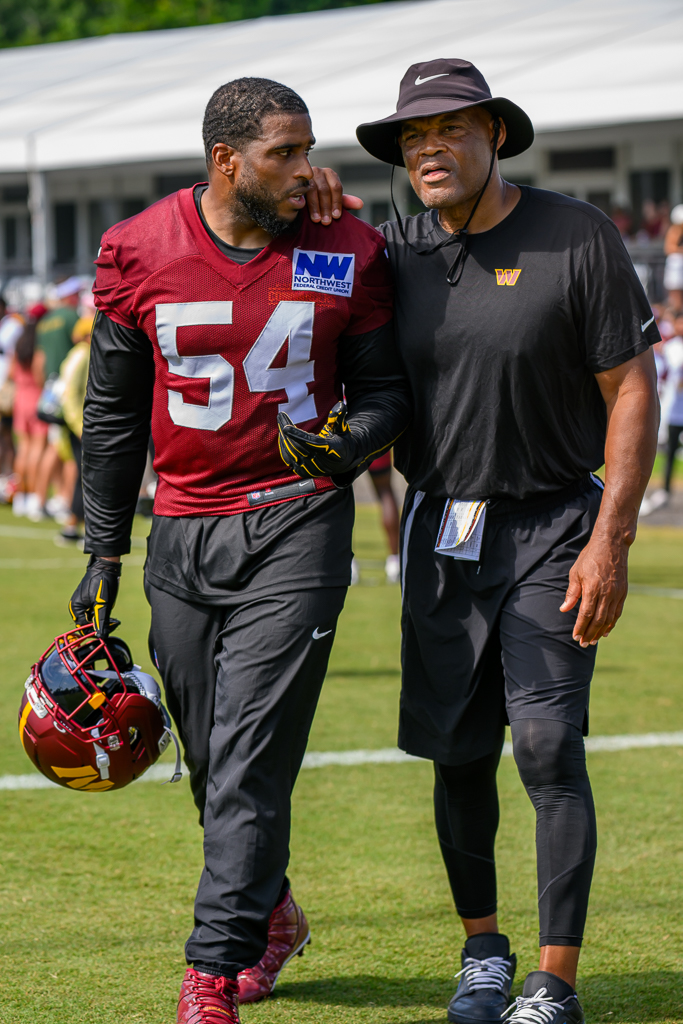
Norton with Bobby Wagner at Washington Commanders training camp, 2025

In February 2024, Norton was hired by the Washington Commanders as their linebackers coach.

== Personal life ==
Norton is the son of Ken Norton, former world champion heavyweight boxer noted for being among the few to ever win against Muhammad Ali.
