= 2011 Dallas Cowboys season =

52nd season in franchise history

- Owner: Jerry Jones
- General manager: Jerry Jones
- Head coach: Jason Garrett
- Home stadium: Cowboys Stadium

Results
- Record: 8–8
- Division place: 3rd NFC East
- Playoffs: Did not qualify
- All-Pros: LB DeMarcus Ware (1st team)
- Pro Bowlers: DT Jay Ratliff; LB DeMarcus Ware

Uniform
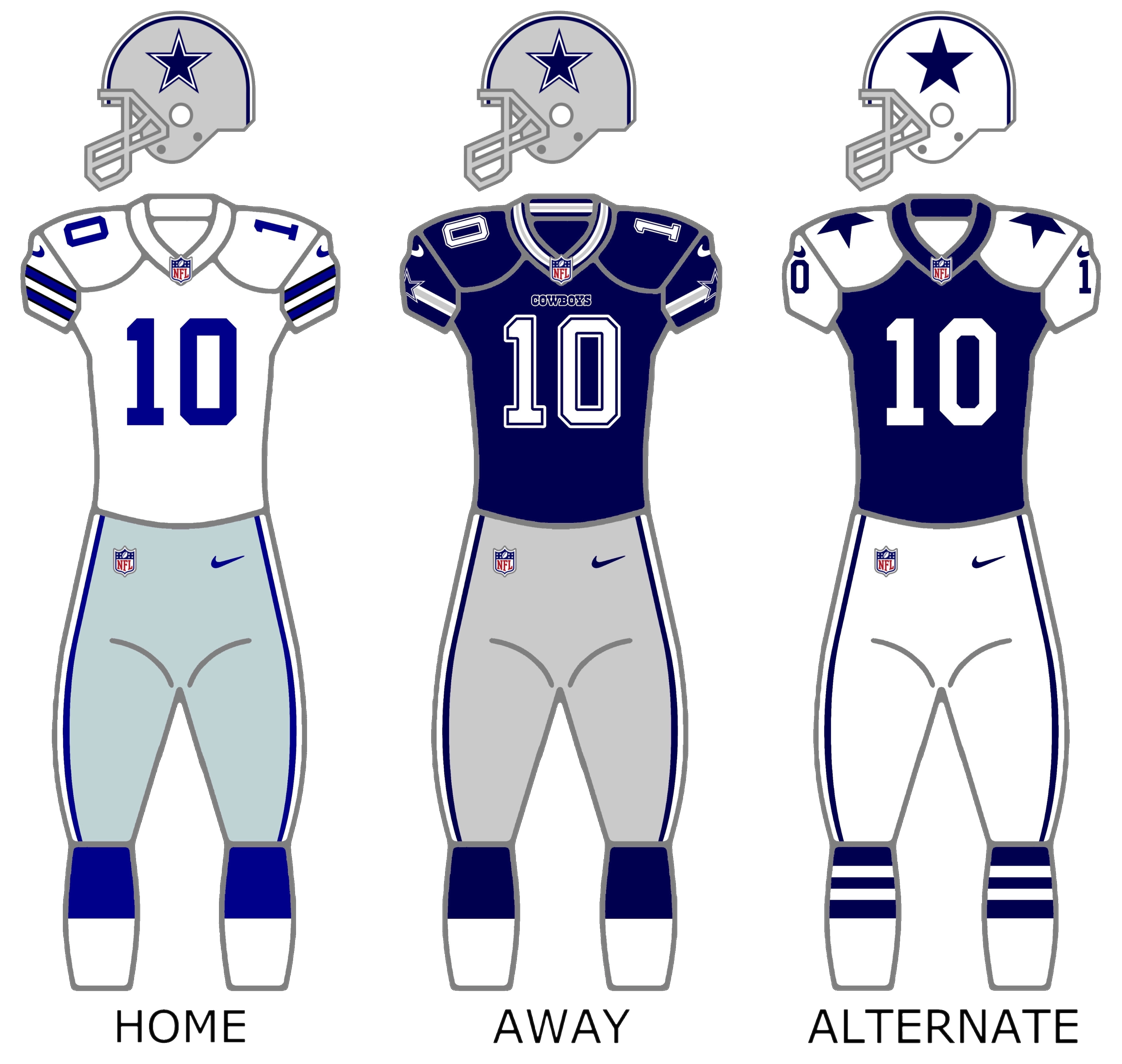

The 2011 season was the Dallas Cowboys' 52nd in the National Football League (NFL), their third playing home games at Cowboys Stadium and their first full season under head coach Jason Garrett. The team improved on their 6–10 record from 2010, but missed the playoffs for the second consecutive season due to their week 17 loss to the eventual Super Bowl champion New York Giants.

== Offseason ==
=== Players added ===
Pos.	Player	2010 Team
DE	Kenyon Coleman	Cleveland Browns

=== Players lost ===
Pos.	Player	2011 Team
RB	Marion Barber III	Chicago Bears
DE	Stephen Bowen	Washington Redskins
T	Marc Colombo	Miami Dolphins
G	Leonard Davis	Detroit Lions
WR	Sam Hurd	Chicago Bears
WR	Roy Williams	Chicago Bears

=== 2011 draft class ===
2011 Dallas Cowboys draft
Round	Pick	Player	Position	College	Notes
1	9	Tyron Smith *	Offensive tackle	USC	
2	40	Bruce Carter	Linebacker	North Carolina	
3	71	DeMarco Murray *	Running back	Oklahoma	
4	110	David Arkin	Guard	Missouri State	
5	143	Josh Thomas	Cornerback	Buffalo	
6	176	Dwayne Harris *	Wide receiver	East Carolina	
7	220	Shaun Chapas	Fullback	Georgia	from San Diego^{[a]}
7	252	Bill Nagy	Center	Wisconsin	Compensatory selection
Made roster * Made at least one Pro Bowl during career

Notes ^{^[a]} The Cowboys forfeited its original seventh-round selection after selecting defensive tackle Josh Brent in the 2010 supplemental draft.

- The Cowboys later acquired a new seventh-round selection in a trade that sent wide receiver Patrick Crayton to the San Diego Chargers.

=== Undrafted free agents ===
Name	Position	College
Jose Acuna	Tackle	Nevada
Corey Adams	Long Snpper	Kansas State
Alex Albright	Linebacker	Boston College
Dan Bailey	Kicker	Oklahoma State
Billy Blackard	Defensive tackle	Northeastern State
Mario Butler	Cornerback	Georgia Tech
Zach Eskridge	Quarterback	Midwestern State
Alex Ibiloye	Cornerback	TCU
Chris Jones	Punter	Carson–Newman
Kevin Kowalski	Center	Toledo
Orie Lemon	Linebacker	Oklahoma State
Lyle Leong	Wide receiver	Texas Tech
Pepa Letuli	Guard	Hawaii
Tysson Poots	Wide receiver	Southern Utah
Raymond Radway	Wide receiver	Abilene Christian
Chris Randle	Cornerback	Utah State
Collin Zych	Safety	Harvard

== Staff ==
2011 Dallas Cowboys staff
Front office: Owner/president/general manager – Jerry Jones; COO/executive vice president/director of player personnel – Stephen Jones; Assistant director of player personnel – Tom Ciskowski; Director of football administration – Todd Williams; Assistant director of pro scouting – Judd Garrett; Head coaches: Head coach – Jason Garrett; Assistant head coach/wide receivers – Jimmy Robinson; Offensive coaches: Quarterbacks – Wade Wilson; Running backs – Skip Peete; Tight ends/pass game coordinator – John Garrett; Offensive line/run game coordinator – Hudson Houck; Assistant offensive line – Wes Phillips; Offensive quality control/wide receivers – Keith O'Quinn	Defensive coaches: Defensive coordinator – Rob Ryan; Defensive line – Brian Baker; Linebackers – Matt Eberflus; Secondary – Dave Campo; Secondary – Brett Maxie; Defensive quality control/linebackers – Ben Bloom; Defensive assistant- Dave Borgonzi; Special teams coaches: Special teams coordinator – Joe DeCamillis; Assistant special teams/kickers – Chris Boniol; Strength and conditioning: Strength and conditioning – Mike Woicik; Assistant strength and conditioning – Walt Williams

== Rosters ==
=== Opening preseason roster ===
Dallas Cowboys 2011 opening preseason roster
Quarterbacks: 4 Tom Brandstater; 3 Jon Kitna; 7 Stephen McGee; 9 Tony Romo; Running backs: 45 Shaun Chapas FB; 23 Tashard Choice; 44 Chris Gronkowski FB; 28 Felix Jones; 35 Lonyae Miller; 49 Jason Pociask FB/TE; 34 Phillip Tanner; 30 Frank Warren; Wide receivers: 19 Miles Austin; 88 Dez Bryant; 17 James Cleveland; 11 Dominique Edison; 14 Dwayne Harris; 16 Jesse Holley; 15 Manuel Johnson; 13 Lyle Leong; 85 Kevin Ogletree; 84 Tysson Poots; 86 Raymond Radway; 87 Titus Ryan; 10 Teddy Williams CB; Tight ends: 80 Martellus Bennett; 89 John Phillips; 83 Martin Rucker; 82 Jason Witten	Offensive linemen: 73 Jose Acuna T/G; 62 David Arkin G; 67 Phil Costa C/G; 68 Doug Free T; 64 Montrae Holland G; 63 Kyle Kosier G/C; 60 Kevin Kowalski G/C; 79 Pepa Letuli T/G; 61 Bill Nagy C/G; 78 Jermey Parnell T; 77 Tyron Smith T; 76 Sam Young T; Defensive linemen: 92 Josh Brent NT; 98 Kenyon Coleman DE; 66 Clifton Geathers DE; 97 Jason Hatcher DE; 95 Sean Lissemore DE/NT; 99 Igor Olshansky DE; 90 Jay Ratliff NT; 69 Jimmy Saddler-McQueen NT/DE; 96 Marcus Spears DE	Linebackers: 47 Alex Albright OLB; 55 Mike Balogun ILB; 51 Keith Brooking ILB; 57 Victor Butler OLB; 54 Kenwin Cummings ILB; 52 Alex Daniels OLB; 48 Isaiah Greenhouse ILB; 56 Bradie James ILB; 50 Sean Lee ILB; 58 Orie Lemon ILB; 93 Anthony Spencer OLB/DE; 94 DeMarcus Ware OLB/DE; 59 Brandon Williams OLB; Defensive backs: 20 Alan Ball CB/FS; 31 Mario Butler CB; 42 Barry Church SS; 24 Abram Elam SS/FS; 38 Alex Ibiloye CB/SS; 21 Mike Jenkins CB; 37 Bryan McCann CB; 40 Danny McCray FS; 41 Terence Newman CB; 27 Akwasi Owusu-Ansah FS/CB; 33 Chris Randle CB; 32 Orlando Scandrick CB; 36 Andrew Sendejo SS; 43 Gerald Sensabaugh FS/SS; 26 Josh Thomas CB; 25 Ross Weaver CB; 39 Collin Zych SS/FS; Special teams: 46 Corey Adams LS; 5 Dan Bailey K; 18 David Buehler K; 6 Chris Jones P; 91 L. P. Ladouceur LS; 1 Mat McBriar P	Reserve lists: 74 Billy Blackard NT (Waived/Injured); 53 Bruce Carter ILB (Active/NF-Inj.); 2 Kai Forbath K (Active/NF-Inj.); 65 Andre Gurode C (Active/NF-Inj.); 29 DeMarco Murray RB (Active/NF-Inj.); 90 active, 1 inactive

=== Week one roster ===
Dallas Cowboys 2011 week one roster
Quarterbacks: 3 Jon Kitna; 7 Stephen McGee; 9 Tony Romo; Running backs: 23 Tashard Choice; 28 Felix Jones; 29 DeMarco Murray; 34 Phillip Tanner; Wide receivers: 19 Miles Austin; 88 Dez Bryant PR; 17 Dwayne Harris; 16 Jesse Holley; 85 Kevin Ogletree; 81 Laurent Robinson; Tight ends: 80 Martellus Bennett; 89 John Phillips FB; 83 Martin Rucker; 82 Jason Witten	Offensive linemen: 62 David Arkin G; 67 Phil Costa C; 75 Derrick Dockery G; 68 Doug Free T; 63 Kyle Kosier G; 60 Kevin Kowalski C/G; 61 Bill Nagy G; 78 Jermey Parnell T; 77 Tyron Smith T; Defensive linemen: 92 Josh Brent NT; 99 Kenyon Coleman DE; 96 Clifton Geathers DE; 97 Jason Hatcher DE; 95 Sean Lissemore DE/NT; 90 Jay Ratliff NT; 98 Marcus Spears DE	Linebackers: 55 Alex Albright OLB; 51 Keith Brooking ILB; 57 Victor Butler OLB; 56 Bradie James ILB; 50 Sean Lee ILB; 93 Anthony Spencer OLB/DE; 94 DeMarcus Ware OLB/DE; Defensive backs: 20 Alan Ball CB; 42 Barry Church SS; 26 Abram Elam SS/FS; 21 Mike Jenkins CB; 37 Bryan McCann CB/KR; 40 Danny McCray FS; 41 Terence Newman CB; 32 Orlando Scandrick CB; 43 Gerald Sensabaugh FS/SS; Special teams: 5 Dan Bailey K; 18 David Buehler K; 91 L. P. Ladouceur LS; 1 Mat McBriar P	Reserve lists: 54 Bruce Carter ILB (NF-Inj.); 2 Kai Forbath K (NF-Inj.); 86 Raymond Radway WR (IR); Practice Squad: 31 Mario Butler CB; 72 Rob Callaway NT/DE; 45 Shaun Chapas FB; 52 Isaiah Greenhouse ILB/FB; 15 Andre Holmes WR; 58 Orie Lemon ILB; 27 Akwasi Owusu-Ansah FS; 10 Teddy Williams WR; 53 active, 3 inactive, 8 PS

=== Final roster ===
Dallas Cowboys 2011 final roster
Quarterbacks: 14 Chris Greisen; 7 Stephen McGee; 9 Tony Romo; Running backs: 45 Shaun Chapas FB; 24 Tony Fiammetta FB; 28 Felix Jones; 23 Sammy Morris; 30 Chauncey Washington; Wide receivers: 19 Miles Austin; 88 Dez Bryant PR; 17 Dwayne Harris KR; 16 Jesse Holley; 15 Andre Holmes; 85 Kevin Ogletree; 81 Laurent Robinson; Tight ends: 80 Martellus Bennett; 89 John Phillips; 82 Jason Witten	Offensive linemen: 62 David Arkin G; 67 Phil Costa C; 75 Derrick Dockery G; 68 Doug Free T; 63 Kyle Kosier G; 60 Kevin Kowalski C/G; 78 Jermey Parnell T; 77 Tyron Smith T; Defensive linemen: 92 Josh Brent NT; 99 Kenyon Coleman DE; 96 Clifton Geathers DE; 97 Jason Hatcher DE; 95 Sean Lissemore DE; 90 Jay Ratliff NT; 98 Marcus Spears DE	Linebackers: 55 Alex Albright OLB; 51 Keith Brooking ILB; 57 Victor Butler OLB; 54 Bruce Carter ILB; 56 Bradie James ILB; 50 Sean Lee ILB; 93 Anthony Spencer OLB; 94 DeMarcus Ware OLB; Defensive backs: 20 Alan Ball CB; 26 Abram Elam SS; 21 Mike Jenkins CB; 40 Danny McCray FS; 41 Terence Newman CB; 32 Orlando Scandrick CB; 43 Gerald Sensabaugh FS; 36 Mana Silva SS; 25 Frank Walker CB; Special teams: 5 Dan Bailey K; 6 Chris Jones P; 91 L. P. Ladouceur LS	Reserve lists: 18 David Buehler K (IR); 42 Barry Church SS (IR); 2 Kai Forbath K (NF-Inj.); 64 Montrae Holland G (IR); 3 Jon Kitna QB (IR); 1 Mat McBriar P (IR); 29 DeMarco Murray RB (IR); 61 Bill Nagy G (IR); 86 Raymond Radway WR (IR); 34 Phillip Tanner RB (IR); Practice Squad: 31 Mario Butler CB; 72 Rob Callaway NT/DE; 65 Brandon Carter G; 58 Orie Lemon LB; 10 Teddy Williams WR; 27 C. J. Wilson CB; 53 active, 10 inactive, 6 Practice Squad

== Schedule ==
=== Preseason ===
The Cowboys' preseason schedule was announced on April 12, 2011.

Week	Date	Opponent	Result	Record	Game site	NFL.com recap
1	August 11	Denver Broncos	W 24–23	1–0	Cowboys Stadium	Recap
2	August 21	San Diego Chargers	L 7–20	1–1	Cowboys Stadium	Recap
3	August 27	at Minnesota Vikings	W 23–17	2–1	Hubert H. Humphrey Metrodome	Recap
4	September 1	at Miami Dolphins	L 3–17	2–2	Sun Life Stadium	Recap

=== Schedule ===
Week	Date	Opponent	Result	Record	Game site	NFL.com recap
1	September 11	at New York Jets	L 24–27	0–1	MetLife Stadium	Recap
2	September 18	at San Francisco 49ers	W 27–24 (OT)	1–1	Candlestick Park	Recap
3	September 26	Washington Redskins	W 18–16	2–1	Cowboys Stadium	Recap
4	October 2	Detroit Lions	L 30–34	2–2	Cowboys Stadium	Recap
5	Bye					
6	October 16	at New England Patriots	L 16–20	2–3	Gillette Stadium	Recap
7	October 23	St. Louis Rams	W 34–7	3–3	Cowboys Stadium	Recap
8	October 30	at Philadelphia Eagles	L 7–34	3–4	Lincoln Financial Field	Recap
9	November 6	Seattle Seahawks	W 23–13	4–4	Cowboys Stadium	Recap
10	November 13	Buffalo Bills	W 44–7	5–4	Cowboys Stadium	Recap
11	November 20	at Washington Redskins	W 27–24 (OT)	6–4	FedExField	Recap
12	November 24	Miami Dolphins	W 20–19	7–4	Cowboys Stadium	Recap
13	December 4	at Arizona Cardinals	L 13–19 (OT)	7–5	University of Phoenix Stadium	Recap
14	December 11	New York Giants	L 34–37	7–6	Cowboys Stadium	Recap
15	December 17	at Tampa Bay Buccaneers	W 31–15	8–6	Raymond James Stadium	Recap
16	December 24	Philadelphia Eagles	L 7–20	8–7	Cowboys Stadium	Recap
17	January 1	at New York Giants	L 14–31	8–8	MetLife Stadium	Recap

=== Game summaries ===
==== Week 1: at New York Jets ====
Week One: Dallas Cowboys at New York Jets – Game summary

Quarter	1	2	3	4	Total
Cowboys	7	3	7	7	24
Jets	0	7	3	17	27

at MetLife Stadium, East Rutherford, New Jersey

- Date: September 11
- Game time: 8:20 p.m. EDT/7:20 p.m. CDT
- Game weather: 70° F (Cloudy)
- Game attendance: 78,702
- Referee: Alberto Riveron
- TV announcers (NBC): Al Michaels, Cris Collinsworth and Michele Tafoya

Game information

First quarter

- DAL - Dez Bryant 3-yard pass from Tony Romo (Dan Bailey kick), 10:27. Cowboys 7-0. Drive: 9 plays, 74 yards, 4:33.

Second quarter

- DAL - Dan Bailey 34-yard field goal, 3:16. Cowboys 10-0. Drive: 10 plays, 47 yards, 4:47.
- NYJ - Dustin Keller 4-yard pass from Mark Sanchez (Nick Folk kick), 0:37. Cowboys 10-7. Drive: 9 plays, 87 yards, 2:39.

Third quarter

- DAL - Miles Austin 36-yard pass from Tony Romo (Dan Bailey kick), 8:05. Cowboys 17-7. Drive: 8 plays, 73 yards, 4:40.
- NYJ - Nick Folk 34-yard field goal, 4:01. Cowboys 17-10. Drive: 10 plays, 64 yards, 4:04.

Fourth quarter

- DAL - Felix Jones 1-yard run (Dan Bailey kick), 14:50. Cowboys 24-10. Drive: 2 plays, 1 yard, 0:10.
- NYJ - Plaxico Burress 26-yard pass from Mark Sanchez (Nick Folk kick), 11:56. Cowboys 24-17. Drive: 7 plays, 84 yards, 2:54.
- NYJ - Isaiah Trufant 18-yard blocked punt return (Nick Folk kick), 5:00. Tied 24-24.
- NYJ - Nick Folk 50-yard field goal, 0:27. Jets 27-24. Drive: 4 plays, 2 yards, 0:22.

Top passers

- DAL – Tony Romo – 23/36, 342 yards, 2 TD, INT
- NYJ – Mark Sanchez – 26/44, 335 yards, 2 TD, INT

Top rushers

- DAL – Felix Jones – 17 rushes, 44 yards
- NYJ – Shonn Greene – 10 rushes, 26 yards

Top receivers

- DAL – Jason Witten – 6 receptions, 110 yards
- NYJ – LaDainian Tomlinson – 6 receptions, 73 yards

Top tacklers

- DAL – DeMarcus Ware – 4 tackles, 2 sacks
- NYJ – Bart Scott – 8 tackles, 1 sack

==== Week 2: at San Francisco 49ers ====
Week Two: Dallas Cowboys at San Francisco 49ers – Game summary

Quarter	1	2	3	4	OT	Total
Cowboys	0	7	7	10	3	27
49ers	0	14	7	3	0	24

at Candlestick Park, San Francisco, California

- Date: September 18
- Game time: 3:05 p.m. CDT/1:05 p.m. PDT
- Game weather: 70 °F (21 °C) (Sunny)
- Game attendance: 69,732
- Referee: Ron Winter
- TV announcers (Fox): Thom Brennaman, Brian Billick and Laura Okmin

Game information

First quarter

- No scoring plays

Second quarter

- SF - Frank Gore 1-yard run (David Akers kick), 11:54. 49ers 7-0. Drive: 11 plays, 68 yards, 6:40.
- SF - Kyle Williams 12-yard pass from Alex Smith (David Akers kick), 6:23. 49ers 14-0. Drive: 9 plays, 48 yards, 4:23.
- DAL - Miles Austin 53-yard pass from Tony Romo (Dan Bailey kick), 1:48. 49ers 14-7. Drive: 4 plays, 71 yards, 1:17.

Third quarter

- DAL - Miles Austin 5-yard pass from Jon Kitna (Dan Bailey kick), 6:50. Tied 14-14. Drive: 5 plays, 18 yards, 2:09.
- SF - Delanie Walker 29-yard pass from Alex Smith (David Akers kick), 0:37. 49ers 21-14. Drive: 1 play, 29 yards, 0:05.

Fourth quarter

- SF - David Akers 55-yard field goal, 11:12. 49ers 24-14. Drive: 4 plays, 9 yards, 3:15.
- DAL - Miles Austin 25-yard pass from Tony Romo (Dan Bailey kick), 6:55. 49ers 24-21. Drive: 9 plays, 80 yards, 4:17.
- DAL - Dan Bailey 48-yard field goal, 0:00. Tied 24-24. Drive: 10 plays, 44 yards, 4:03.

Overtime

- DAL - Dan Bailey 19-yard field goal, 12:07. Cowboys 27-24. Drive: 2 plays, 77 yards, 0:50.

Top passers

- DAL – Tony Romo - 20/33. 345 yards, 2 TD
- SF – Alex Smith - 16/24, 179 yards, 2 TD, INT

Top rushers

- DAL – Felix Jones - 9 carries, 25 yards
- SF – Frank Gore - 20 carries, 47 yards, TD

Top receivers

- DAL – Miles Austin - 9 receptions, 143 yards, 3 TD
- SF – Ted Ginn Jr. - 4 receptions, 38 yards; Delanie Walker - 2 receptions, 38 yards, TD

Top tacklers

- DAL – Sean Lee - 10 tackles
- SF – NaVorro Bowman - 11 tackles

==== Week 3: vs. Washington Redskins ====
Week Three: Washington Redskins at Dallas Cowboys – Game summary

Quarter	1	2	3	4	Total
Redskins	6	3	7	0	16
Cowboys	3	6	3	6	18

at Cowboys Stadium, Arlington, Texas

- Date: September 26
- Game time: 7:30 p.m. CDT
- Game weather: 90 °F (32 °C) (retractable roof open)
- Game attendance: 91,017
- Referee: Ed Hochuli
- TV announcers (ESPN): Mike Tirico, Ron Jaworski, Jon Gruden and Ed Werder

Game information

First quarter

- WAS – Graham Gano 46-yard field goal, 10:06. Redskins 3–0. Drive: 10 plays, 42 yards, 4:54.
- DAL – Dan Bailey 41-yard field goal, 5:34. Tied 3–3. Drive: 9 plays, 57 yards, 4:32.
- WAS – Graham Gano 46-yard field goal, 0:21. Redskins 6–3. Drive: 4 plays, 1 yard, 1:36.

Second quarter

- DAL – Dan Bailey 41-yard field goal, 12:20. Tied 6–6. Drive: 4 plays, 9 yards, 1:52.
- DAL – Dan Bailey 32-yard field goal, 2:25. Cowboys 9–6. Drive: 7 plays, 57 yards, 3:57.
- WAS – Graham Gano 50-yard field goal, 0:00. Tied 9–9. Drive: 10 plays, 48 yards, 2:25.

Third quarter

- WAS – Tim Hightower 1-yard pass from Rex Grossman (Graham Gano kick), 4:00. Redskins 16–9. Drive: 9 plays, 76 yards, 5:31.
- DAL – Dan Bailey 41-yard field goal, 0:19. Redskins 16–12. Drive: 7 plays, 57 yards, 3:41.

Fourth quarter

- DAL – Dan Bailey 23-yard field goal, 6:58. Redskins 16–15. Drive: 9 plays, 76 yards, 4:28.
- DAL – Dan Bailey 40-yard field goal, 1:47. Cowboys 18–16. Drive: 9 plays, 64 yards, 1:57.

Top passers

- WAS - Rex Grossman - 22/37, 250 yards, TD, INT
- DAL - Tony Romo - 22/36, 255 yards, INT

Top rushers

- WAS – Tim Hightower – 14 carries, 41 yards
- DAL – Felix Jones – 14 carries, 115 yards

Top receivers

- WAS – Santana Moss – 5 receptions, 70 yards
- DAL – Dez Bryant – 4 receptions, 63 yards

Top tacklers

- WAS – O.J. Atogwe – 6 tackles; DeAngelo Hall – 6 tackles
- DAL – Gerald Sensabaugh – 6 tackles, 1 assist

==== Week 4: vs. Detroit Lions ====
Week Four: Detroit Lions at Dallas Cowboys – Game summary

Quarter	1	2	3	4	Total
Lions	0	3	14	17	34
Cowboys	7	13	10	0	30

at Cowboys Stadium, Arlington, Texas

- Date: October 2
- Game time: 12:00 p.m. CDT
- Game weather: Played indoors (retractable roof closed)
- Game attendance: 78,122
- Referee: John Parry
- TV announcers (Fox): Joe Buck, Troy Aikman and Pam Oliver
- Recap
  Gamebook

Game information

First quarter

- DAL – Dez Bryant 25-yard pass from Tony Romo (Dan Bailey kick), 9:28. Cowboys 7–0. Drive: 6 plays, 55 yards, 3:55.

Second quarter

- DAL – Dez Bryant 6-yard pass from Tony Romo (Dan Bailey kick), 10:58. Cowboys 14–0. Drive: 4 plays, 71 yards, 2:25.
- DAL – Dan Bailey 41-yard field goal, 6:28. Cowboys 17–0. Drive: 7 plays, 26 yards, 2:48.
- DET – Jason Hanson 33-yard field goal, 4:08. Cowboys 17–3. Drive: 9 plays, 47 yards, 2:20.
- DAL – Dan Bailey 35-yard field goal, 0:00. Cowboys 20–3. Drive: 8 plays, 63 yards, 1:28.

Third quarter

- DAL – Jason Witten 1-yard pass from Tony Romo (Dan Bailey kick), 12:23. Cowboys 27–3. Drive: 6 plays, 46 yards, 2:37.
- DET – Bobby Carpenter 34-yard interception return (Jason Hanson kick), 10:12. Cowboys 27–10.
- DET – Chris Houston 56-yard interception return (Jason Hanson kick), 5:34. Cowboys 27–17.
- DAL – Dan Bailey 23-yard field goal, 0:37. Cowboys 30–17. Drive: 9 plays, 75 yards, 4:57.

Fourth quarter

- DET – Calvin Johnson 23-yard pass from Matthew Stafford (Jason Hanson kick), 13:37. Cowboys 30–24. Drive: 5 plays, 80 yards, 2:00.
- DET – Jason Hanson 51-yard field goal, 4:22. Cowboys 30–27. Drive: 8 plays, 14 yards, 3:14.
- DET – Calvin Johnson 2-yard pass from Matthew Stafford (Jason Hanson kick), 1:39. Lions 34–30. Drive: 7 plays, 40 yards, 2:34.

Top passers

- DET – Matthew Stafford – 21/43, 240 yards, 2 TD, INT
- DAL – Tony Romo – 34/47, 331 yards, 3 TD, 3 INT

Top rushers

- DET – Jahvid Best – 11 carries, 47 yards
- DAL – Felix Jones – 16 carries, 57 yards

Top receivers

- DET – Calvin Johnson – 8 receptions, 96 yards, 2 TD
- DAL – Laurent Robinson – 7 receptions, 116 yards

Top tacklers

- DET – Stephen Tulloch – 10 tackles, 2 assists, INT
- DAL – Barry Church – 4 tackles, 1 assist

With their second loss to the Lions at home in five years, the Cowboys fell to 2–2.

==== Week 6: at New England Patriots ====
Week Six: Dallas Cowboys at New England Patriots – Game summary

Quarter	1	2	3	4	Total
Cowboys	3	7	3	3	16
Patriots	3	10	0	7	20

at Gillette Stadium, Foxborough, Massachusetts

- Date: October 16
- Game time: 4:15 p.m. EDT/3:15 p.m. CDT
- Game weather: 63 °F (17 °C) (Partly Cloudy)
- Game attendance: 68,756
- Referee: Walt Coleman
- TV announcers (Fox): Thom Brennaman, Troy Aikman and Pam Oliver

Game information

First quarter

- NE - Stephen Gostkowski 31-yard field goal, 8:41. Patriots 3-0. Drive: 9 plays, 34 yards, 3:22.
- DAL - Dan Bailey 48-yard field goal, 3:16. Tied 3-3. Drive: 4 plays, -7 yards, 1:31.

Second quarter

- NE - Stephen Gostkowski 26-yard field goal, 12:07. Patriots 6-3. Drive: 11 plays, 72 yards, 3:56.
- NE - Wes Welker 5-yard pass from Tom Brady (Stephen Gostkowski kick), 7:34. Patriots 13-3. Drive: 7 plays, 69 yards, 3:03.
- DAL - Jason Witten 1-yard pass from Tony Romo (Dan Bailey kick), 0:33. Patriots 13-10. Drive: 11 plays, 93 yards, 7:01.

Third quarter

- DAL - Dan Bailey 22-yard field goal, 5:50. Tied 13-13. Drive: 12 plays, 77 yards, 5:58.

Fourth quarter

- DAL - Dan Bailey 26-yard field goal, 5:13. Cowboys 16-13. Drive: 9 plays, 60 yards, 3:55.
- NE - Aaron Hernandez 8-yard pass from Tom Brady (Stephen Gostkowski kick), 0:22. Patriots 20-16. Drive: 10 plays, 80 yards, 2:02.

Top passers

- DAL – Tony Romo - 27/41, 317 yards, TD, INT
- NE – Tom Brady - 27/41, 289 yards, 2 TD, 2 INT

Top rushers

- DAL – DeMarco Murray - 11 carries, 34 yards
- NE – BenJarvus Green-Ellis - 14 carries, 58 yards

Top receivers

- DAL – Dez Bryant - 4 receptions, 78 yards
- NE – Rob Gronkowski - 7 receptions, 74 yards

Top tacklers

- DAL – Sean Lee - 12 tackles
- NE – Kyle Arrington - 11 tackles

The Cowboys' blue uniforms returned after a 1-year hiatus, and they blew a 3-point fourth quarter lead, and lost to the 2011 AFC champion New England Patriots.

==== Week 7: vs. St. Louis Rams ====
Week Seven: St. Louis Rams at Dallas Cowboys – Game summary

Quarter	1	2	3	4	Total
Rams	0	7	0	0	7
Cowboys	7	10	3	14	34

at Cowboys Stadium, Arlington, Texas

- Date: October 23
- Game time: 3:15 p.m. CDT
- Game weather: Played indoors (retractable roof closed)
- Game attendance: 80,086
- Referee: Alberto Riveron
- TV announcers (Fox): Dick Stockton and John Lynch

Game information

First quarter

- DAL - DeMarco Murray 91-yard run (Dan Bailey kick), 9:33. Cowboys 7-0. Drive: 3 plays, 98 yards, 2:08.

Second quarter

- DAL - Jason Witten 1-yard pass from Tony Romo (Dan Bailey kick), 12:25. Cowboys 14-0. Drive: 7 plays, 62 yards, 3:14.
- STL - Steven Jackson 6-yard run (Josh Brown kick), 7:58. Cowboys 14-7. Drive: 8 plays, 85 yards, 4:27.
- DAL - Dan Bailey 30-yard field goal, 0:15. Cowboys 17-7. Drive: 8 plays, 18 yards, 3:19.

Third quarter

- DAL - Dan Bailey 51-yard field goal, 5:32. Cowboys 20-7. Drive: 13 plays, 55 yards, 6:50.

Fourth quarter

- DAL - Phillip Tanner 6-yard run (Dan Bailey kick), 9:22. Cowboys 27-7. Drive: 6 plays, 78 yards, 4:31.
- DAL - Dez Bryant 20-yard pass from Tony Romo (Dan Bailey kick), 4:07. Cowboys 34-7. Drive: 5 plays, 34 yards, 3:17.

Top passers

- STL – AJ Feeley - 20/33, 196 yards, INT
- DAL – Tony Romo - 14/24, 166 yards, 2 TD

Top rushers

- STL – Steven Jackson - 18 carries, 70 yards, TD
- DAL – DeMarco Murray - 25 carries, 253 yards, TD

Top receivers

- STL – Brandon Lloyd - 6 receptions, 74 yards
- DAL – Dez Bryant - 5 receptions, 90 yards, TD

Top tacklers

- STL – Quintin Mikell - 10 tackles
- DAL – Abram Elam - 8 tackles

This game is notable for DeMarco Murray, in his first NFL start, setting the Cowboys single game rushing record.

==== Week 8: at Philadelphia Eagles ====
Week Eight: Dallas Cowboys at Philadelphia Eagles – Game summary

Quarter	1	2	3	4	Total
Cowboys	0	0	0	7	7
Eagles	14	10	3	7	34

at Lincoln Financial Field, Philadelphia

- Date: October 30
- Game time: 8:20 p.m. EDT/7:20 p.m. CDT
- Game weather: 42 °F (6 °C) (Clear)
- Game attendance: 69,144
- Referee: Gene Steratore
- TV announcers (NBC): Al Michaels, Cris Collinsworth and Michele Tafoya

Game information

First quarter

- PHI - Jeremy Maclin 12-yard pass from Michael Vick (Alex Henery kick), 10:41. Eagles 7-0. Drive: 8 plays, 79 yards, 4:19.
- PHI - LeSean McCoy 2-yard run (Alex Henery kick), 2:40. Eagles 14-0. Drive: 7 plays, 90 yards, 4:21.

Second quarter

- PHI - Brent Celek 9-yard pass from Michael Vick (Alex Henery kick), 10:13. Eagles 21-0. Drive: 11 plays, 67 yards, 6:00.
- PHI - Alex Henery 23-yard field goal, 1:46. Eagles 24-0. Drive: 13 plays, 83 yards, 6:08.

Third quarter

- PHI - Alex Henery 26-yard field goal, 5:55. Eagles 27-0. Drive: 13 plays, 68 yards, 6:28.

Fourth quarter

- PHI - LeSean McCoy 13-yard run (Alex Henery kick), 13:21. Eagles 34-0. Drive: 9 plays, 68 yards, 6:42.
- DAL - Laurent Robinson 70-yard pass from Tony Romo (Dan Bailey kick), 12:44. Eagles 34-7. Drive: 2 plays, 76 yards, 0:37.

Top passers

- DAL – Tony Romo - 18/35, 203 yards, TD, INT
- PHI – Michael Vick - 21/28, 279 yards, 2 TD

Top rushers

- DAL – DeMarco Murray - 8 carries, 74 yards
- PHI – LeSean McCoy - 30 carries, 185 yards, 2 TD

Top receivers

- DAL – Laurent Robinson - 5 receptions, 103 yards, TD
- PHI – Brent Celek - 7 receptions, 94 yards, TD

Top tacklers

- DAL – DeMarcus Ware - 11 tackles, 4 sacks
- PHI – Jamar Chaney - 7 tackles

==== Week 9: vs. Seattle Seahawks ====
Week Nine: Seattle Seahawks at Dallas Cowboys – Game summary

Quarter	1	2	3	4	Total
Seahawks	3	3	0	7	13
Cowboys	3	3	7	10	23

at Cowboys Stadium, Arlington, Texas

- Date: November 6
- Game time: 12:00 p.m. CST
- Game weather: Played indoors (retractable roof closed)
- Game attendance: 81,510
- Referee: Terry McAulay
- TV announcers (Fox): Chris Myers, Tim Ryan and Jaime Maggio

Game information

First quarter

- DAL - Dan Bailey 20-yard field goal, 4:25. Cowboys 3-0. Drive: 11 plays, 96 yards, 6:02.
- SEA - Steven Hauschka 45-yard field goal, 0:04. Tied 3-3. Drive: 8 plays, 53 yards, 4:21.

Second quarter

- DAL - Dan Bailey 20-yard field goal, 10:23. Cowboys 6-3. Drive: 12 plays, 86 yards, 4:41.
- SEA - Steven Hauschka 32-yard field goal, 1:03. Tied 6-6. Drive: 13 plays, 81 yards, 5:25.

Third quarter

- DAL - Jason Witten 33-yard pass from Tony Romo (Dan Bailey kick), 8:39. Cowboys 13-6. Drive: 6 plays, 64 yards, 3:17.

Fourth quarter

- DAL - Laurent Robinson 6-yard pass from Tony Romo (Dan Bailey kick), 14:10. Cowboys 20-6. Drive: 6 plays, 40 yards, 2:24.
- DAL - Dan Bailey 42-yard field goal, 11:23. Cowboys 23-6. Drive: 5 plays, 11 yards, 1:58.
- SEA - Marshawn Lynch 4-yard run (Steven Hauschka kick), 6:12. Cowboys 23-13. Drive: 10 plays, 70 yards, 5:10.

Top passers

- SEA – Tarvaris Jackson - 17/30, 221 yards, 3 INT
- DAL – Tony Romo - 19/31, 279 yards, 2 TD

Top rushers

- SEA – Marshawn Lynch - 23 rushes, 135 yards, TD
- DAL – DeMarco Murray - 22 rushes, 139 yards

Top receivers

- SEA – Sidney Rice - 3 receptions, 69 yards
- DAL – Dez Bryant - 4 receptions, 76 yards

Top tacklers

- SEA – Earl Thomas - 8 tackles
- DAL – Orlando Scandrick - 7 tackles

==== Week 10: vs. Buffalo Bills ====
Week Ten: Buffalo Bills at Dallas Cowboys – Game summary

Quarter	1	2	3	4	Total
Bills	0	7	0	0	7
Cowboys	14	14	6	10	44

at Cowboys Stadium, Arlington, Texas

- Date: November 13
- Game time: 12:00 p.m. CST
- Game weather: Played indoors (retractable roof closed)
- Game attendance: 85,157
- Referee: Jerome Boger
- TV announcers (CBS): Jim Nantz and Phil Simms

Game information

First quarter

- DAL - Dez Bryant 34-yard pass from Tony Romo (Dan Bailey kick), 12:12. Cowboys 7-0. Drive: 5 plays, 80 yards, 2:48.
- DAL - Laurent Robinson 5-yard pass from Tony Romo (Dan Bailey kick), 3:05. Cowboys 14-0. Drive: 12 plays, 78 yards, 7:35.

Second quarter

- DAL - Laurent Robinson 58-yard pass from Tony Romo (Dan Bailey kick), 12:17. Cowboys 21-0. Drive: 1 play, 58 yards, 0:09.
- BUF - David Nelson 3-yard pass from Ryan Fitzpatrick (Dave Rayner kick), 8:16. Cowboys 21-7. Drive: 7 plays, 80 yards, 4:01.
- DAL - DeMarco Murray 1-yard run (Dan Bailey kick), 1:05. Cowboys 28-7. Drive: 14 plays, 80 yards, 7:11.

Third quarter

- DAL - Dan Bailey 45-yard field goal, 2:25. Cowboys 31-7. Drive: 7 plays, 39 yards, 3:24.
- DAL - Dan Bailey 36-yard field goal, 0:16. Cowboys 34-7. Drive: 4 plays, 4 yards, 1:58.

Fourth quarter

- DAL - Dan Bailey 31-yard field goal, 5:11. Cowboys 37-7. Drive: 11 plays, 59 yards, 7:44.
- DAL - Terence Newman 43-yard interception return (Dan Bailey kick), 4:54. Cowboys 44-7.

Top passers

- BUF - Ryan Fitzpatrick - 20/31, 146 yards, TD, 3 INT
- DAL - Tony Romo - 23/26, 270 yards, 3 TD

Top rushers

- BUF - Fred Jackson - 13 carries, 144 yards
- DAL - DeMarco Murray - 20 carries, 135 yards, TD

Top receivers

- BUF - Donald Jones - 6 receptions, 51 yards
- DAL - Dez Bryant - 6 receptions, 74 yards, TD

Top tacklers

- BUF - Jairus Byrd - 8 tackles, 2 assists; George Wilson - 8 tackles, 2 assists
- DAL - Keith Brooking - 5 tackles, 2 assists; Gerald Sensabaugh - 5 tackles, 2 assists
- BUF -

==== Week 11: at Washington Redskins ====
Week Eleven: Dallas Cowboys at Washington Redskins – Game summary

Quarter	1	2	3	4	OT	Total
Cowboys	7	3	0	14	3	27
Redskins	0	14	3	7	0	24

at FedExField, Landover, Maryland

- Date: November 20
- Game time: 1:00 p.m. EST/12:00 p.m. CST
- Game weather: 60 °F (16 °C) (Cloudy)
- Game attendance: 80,122
- Referee: Ed Hochuli
- TV announcers (Fox): Kenny Albert, Daryl Johnston and Tony Siragusa

Game information

First quarter

- DAL - Dez Bryant 22-yard pass from Tony Romo (Dan Bailey kick), 7:44. Cowboys 7-0. Drive: 3 plays, 24 yards, 0:55.

Second quarter

- DAL - Dan Bailey 37-yard field goal, 10:23. Cowboys 10-0. Drive: 8 plays, 33 yards, 4:14.
- WAS - Rex Grossman 4-yard run (Graham Gano kick), 3:59. Cowboys 10-7. Drive: 6 plays, 32 yards, 3:24.
- WAS - Jabar Gaffney 16-yard pass from Rex Grossman (Graham Gano kick), 0:14. Redskins 14-10. Drive: 5 plays, 43 yards, 1:27.

Third quarter

- WAS - Graham Gano 40-yard field goal, 11:40. Redskins 17-10. Drive: 8 plays, 55 yards, 3:20.

Fourth quarter

- DAL - Laurent Robinson 7-yard pass from Tony Romo (Dan Bailey kick), 14:43. Tied 17-17. Drive: 14 plays, 61 yards, 6:24.
- DAL - Jason Witten 59-yard pass from Tony Romo (Dan Bailey kick), 8:48. Cowboys 24-17. Drive: 7 plays, 88 yards, 2:22.
- WAS - Donte Stallworth 4-yard pass from Rex Grossman (Graham Gano kick), 0:14. Tied 24-24. Drive: 12 plays, 89 yards, 5:29.

Overtime

- DAL - Dan Bailey 39-yard field goal, 5:39. Cowboys 27-24. Drive: 7 plays, 37 yards, 3:41.

Top passers

- DAL – Tony Romo - 23/37, 292 yards, 3 TD
- WAS – Rex Grossman - 25/38, 292 yards, 2 TD, INT

Top rushers

- DAL – DeMarco Murray - 25 carries, 73 yards
- WAS – Roy Helu - 8 carries, 35 yards

Top receivers

- DAL – Jason Witten - 3 receptions, 85 yards, TD
- WAS – Jabar Gaffney - 7 receptions, 115 yards, TD

Top tacklers

- DAL – Sean Lee - 10 tackles, 4 assists
- WAS – London Fletcher - 16 tackles, 7 assists

==== Week 12: vs. Miami Dolphins ====
Thanksgiving Day game

Week Twelve: Miami Dolphins at Dallas Cowboys – Game summary

Quarter	1	2	3	4	Total
Dolphins	3	3	10	3	19
Cowboys	0	10	0	10	20

at Cowboys Stadium, Arlington, Texas

- Date: November 24
- Game time: 3:15 p.m. CST
- Game weather: Played indoors (retractable roof closed)
- Game attendance: 87,418
- Referee: Pete Morelli
- TV announcers (CBS): Jim Nantz and Phil Simms

Game information

First quarter

- MIA - Shayne Graham 26-yard field goal, 2:42. Dolphins 3-0. Drive: 5 plays, 18 yards, 2:04.

Second quarter

- DAL - Dan Bailey 32-yard field goal, 4:38. Tied 3-3. Drive: 10 plays, 48 yards, 5:04.
- DAL - Laurent Robinson 5-yard pass from Tony Romo (Dan Bailey kick), 0:55. Cowboys 10-3. Drive: 1 play, 5 yards, 0:06.
- MIA - Shayne Graham 28-yard field goal, 0:00. Cowboys 10-6. Drive: 7 plays, 46 yards, 0:55.

Third quarter

- MIA - Shayne Graham 27-yard field goal, 8:02. Cowboys 10-9. Drive: 11 plays, 71 yards, 6:58.
- MIA - Brandon Marshall 35-yard pass from Matt Moore (Shayne Graham kick), 3:54. Dolphins 16-10. Drive: 5 plays, 74 yards, 2:20.

Fourth quarter

- DAL - Laurent Robinson 18-yard pass from Tony Romo (Dan Bailey kick), 14:31. Cowboys 17-16. Drive: 9 plays, 77 yards, 4:23.
- MIA - Shayne Graham 23-yard field goal, 7:14. Dolphins 19-17. Drive: 14 plays, 76 yards, 7:17.
- DAL - Dan Bailey 28-yard field goal, 0:00. Cowboys 20-19. Drive: 10 plays, 54 yards, 2:59.

Top passers

- MIA – Matt Moore - 19/32, 288 yards, TD
- DAL – Tony Romo - 22/34, 226 yards, 2 TD, 2 INT

Top rushers

- MIA – Reggie Bush - 16 carries, 61 yards
- DAL – DeMarco Murray - 22 carries, 87 yards

Top receivers

- MIA – Brandon Marshall - 5 receptions, 103 yards, TD
- DAL – Laurent Robinson - 7 receptions, 79 yards, 2 TD

Top tacklers

- MIA – Kevin Burnett - 12 tackles, 1 assist
- DAL – Anthony Spencer - 9 tackles, 2 assists

Coming off their thrilling overtime road win over the Redskins, the Cowboys went home, donned their throwback uniforms, and played a Week 12 interconference duel with the Miami Dolphins in the annual Thanksgiving game. Dallas trailed early in the first quarter with Dolphins kicker Shayne Graham getting a 26-yard field goal, yet the Cowboys would answer in the second quarter with a 26-yard field goal from kicker Dan Bailey, followed by quarterback Tony Romo finding wide receiver Laurent Robinson on a 5-yard touchdown pass. Miami would close out the half with Graham making a 28-yard field goal.

The Dolphins retook the lead in the third quarter with Graham booting a 27-yard field goal, followed by quarterback Matt Moore completing a 35-yard touchdown pass to wide receiver Brandon Marshall. Afterwards, Dallas regained the lead in the fourth quarter with Romo connecting with Robinson again on an 18-yard touchdown pass. Miami struck back with Graham making a 23-yard field goal, but Bailey rescued the Cowboys by nailing the winning 28-yard field goal.

With the win, Dallas improved to 7–4.

Bailey (2/2 on field goal, including game-winning 28-yarder) and linebacker DeMarcus Ware (1 assist and a fumble recovery) were named CBS' All-Iron Award winners.

==== Week 13: at Arizona Cardinals ====
Week Thirteen: Dallas Cowboys at Arizona Cardinals – Game summary

Quarter	1	2	3	4	OT	Total
Cowboys	0	10	3	0	0	13
Cardinals	3	0	3	7	6	19

at University of Phoenix Stadium, Glendale, Arizona

- Date: December 4
- Game time: 3:15 p.m. CST/2:15 p.m. MST
- Game weather: Played indoors (retractable roof open)
- Game attendance: 62,180
- Referee: Walt Coleman
- TV announcers (Fox): Dick Stockton, John Lynch and Jennifer Hale

Game information

First quarter

- ARI - Jay Feely 48-yard field goal, 4:13. Cardinals 3-0. Drive: 6 plays, 27 yards, 3:03.

Second quarter

- DAL - Dan Bailey 50-yard field goal, 5:50. Tied 3-3. Drive: 8 plays, 30 yards, 3:51.
- DAL - Dez Bryant 5-yard pass from Tony Romo (Dan Bailey kick), 3:09. Cowboys 10-3. Drive: 3 plays, 33 yards, 0:57.

Third quarter

- ARI - Jay Feely 23-yard field goal, 8:18. Cowboys 10-6. Drive: 12 plays, 74 yards, 6:42.
- DAL - Dan Bailey 37-yard field goal, 0:34. Cowboys 13-6. Drive: 13 plays, 65 yards, 7:44.

Fourth quarter

- ARI - Beanie Wells 4-yard run (Jay Feely kick), 13:08. Tied 13-13. Drive: 6 plays, 79 yards, 2:26.

Overtime

- ARI - LaRod Stephens-Howling 52-yard pass from Kevin Kolb, 11:43. Cardinals 19-13. Drive: 5 plays, 80 yards, 3:17.

Top passers

- DAL – Tony Romo - 28/42, 299 yards, TD
- ARI – Kevin Kolb 16/25, 247 yards, TD

Top rushers

- DAL – DeMarco Murray - 12 carries, 38 yards
- ARI – Beanie Wells - 20 carries, 67 yards, TD

Top receivers

- DAL – Dez Bryant - 8 receptions, 86 yards, TD
- ARI – Andre Roberts - 6 receptions, 111 yards

Top tacklers

- DAL – Sean Lee - 7 tackles, 2 assists
- ARI – Daryl Washington - 9 tackles, assist

With seconds left in regulation with the score at 13-13, Jason Garrett called a time out before Dan Bailey was set to kick a 49-yard field goal that would have ended the game (commonly referred to as "icing the kicker"); Bailey ended up missing the field goal and the Cowboys lost the game in overtime.

==== Week 14: vs. New York Giants ====
Week Fourteen: New York Giants at Dallas Cowboys – Game summary

Quarter	1	2	3	4	Total
Giants	5	10	7	15	37
Cowboys	7	10	3	14	34

at Cowboys Stadium, Arlington, Texas

- Date: December 11
- Game time: 7:20 p.m. CST
- Game weather: Played indoors (retractable roof closed)
- Game attendance: 95,952
- Referee: Scott Green
- TV announcers (NBC): Al Michaels, Cris Collinsworth, & Michele Tafoya

Game information

First quarter

- NYG – Tony Romo sacked by Jason Pierre-Paul in the endzone for a safety, 9:42. Giants 2–0.
- NYG – Lawrence Tynes 23-yard field goal, 7:07. Giants 5–0. Drive: 7 plays, 66 yards, 2:35.
- DAL – John Phillips 12-yard pass from Tony Romo (Dan Bailey kick), 2:49. Cowboys 7–5. Drive: 8 plays, 80 yards, 4:18.

Second quarter

- NYG – Brandon Jacobs 1-yard run (Lawrence Tynes kick), 12:45. Giants 12–7. Drive: 10 plays, 80 yards, 5:04.
- DAL – Laurent Robinson 9-yard pass from Tony Romo (Dan Bailey kick), 6:26. Cowboys 14–12. Drive: 11 plays, 80 yards, 6:19.
- NYG - Lawrence Tynes 26-yard field goal, 1:03. Giants 15-14. Drive: 4 plays, 6 yards, 0:22.
- DAL - Dan Bailey 49-yard field goal, 0:15. Cowboys 17-15. Drive: 6 plays, 49 yards, 0:48.

Third quarter

- DAL - Dan Bailey 49-yard field goal, 7:42. Cowboys 20-15. Drive: 11 plays, 41 yards, 5:11.
- NYG - Mario Manningham 47-yard pass from Eli Manning (Lawrence Tynes kick), 4:30. Giants 22-20. Drive: 9 plays, 85 yards, 3:12.

Fourth quarter

- DAL - Miles Austin 6-yard pass from Tony Romo (Dan Bailey kick), 12:43. Cowboys 27-22. Drive: 4 plays, 80 yards, 1:31.
- DAL - Dez Bryant 50-yard pass from Tony Romo (Dan Bailey kick), 5:41. Cowboys 34-22. Drive: 2 plays, 49 yards, 0:54.
- NYG - Jake Ballard 8-yard pass from Eli Manning (Lawrence Tynes kick), 3:14. Cowboys 34-29. Drive: 8 plays, 80 yards, 2:27.
- NYG - Brandon Jacobs 1-yard run (Danny Ware run), 0:46. Giants 37-34. Drive: 6 plays, 58 yards, 1:26.

Top passers

- NYG – Eli Manning - 27/47, 400 yards, 2 TD, INT
- DAL – Tony Romo - 21/31, 321 yards, 4 TD

Top rushers

- NYG - Brandon Jacobs - 19 carries, 101 yards, 2 TD
- DAL - Felix Jones - 16 carries, 106 yards

Top receivers

- NYG – Hakeem Nicks - 8 receptions, 163 yards
- DAL – Laurent Robinson - 4 receptions, 137 yards, TD

Top tacklers

- NYG – Jason Pierre-Paul - 8 tackles, 2 assists
- DAL – Sean Lee - 9 tackles 4 assists; Bradie James - 9 tackles, 5 assists

==== Week 15: at Tampa Bay Buccaneers ====
Week Fifteen: Dallas Cowboys at Tampa Bay Buccaneers – Game summary

Quarter	1	2	3	4	Total
Cowboys	14	14	3	0	31
Buccaneers	0	0	15	0	15

at Raymond James Stadium, Tampa, Florida

- Date: December 17
- Game time: 8:20 p.m. EST/7:20 p.m. CST
- Game weather: 66 °F (19 °C) (Clear)
- Game attendance: 65,162
- Referee: Terry McAulay
- TV announcers (NFLN): Brad Nessler, Mike Mayock and Alex Flanagan

Game information

First quarter

- DAL - Miles Austin 8-yard pass from Tony Romo (Dan Bailey kick), 8:44. Cowboys 7-0. Drive: 7 plays, 56 yards, 3:52.
- DAL - Dez Bryant 8-yard pass from Tony Romo (Dan Bailey kick), 0:18. Cowboys 14-0. Drive: 10 plays, 69 yards, 6:17.

Second quarter

- DAL - Laurent Robinson 9-yard pass from Tony Romo (Dan Bailey kick), 4:42. Cowboys 21-0. Drive: 7 plays, 89 yards, 3:52.
- DAL - Tony Romo 1-yard run (Dan Bailey kick), 0:20. Cowboys 28-0. Drive: 8 plays, 62 yards, 2:32.

Third quarter

- TB - Dekoda Watson 7-yard defensive fumble return (Connor Barth kick), 13:39. Cowboys 28-7.
- DAL - Dan Bailey 30-yard field goal, 6:38. Cowboys 31-7. Drive: 7 plays, 68 yards, 7:01.
- TB - Dezmon Briscoe 13-yard pass from Josh Freeman (Kellen Winslow pass from Josh Freeman), 0:23. Cowboys 31-15. Drive: 12 plays, 75 yards, 6:15.

Fourth quarter

- No scoring plays

Top passers

- DAL – Tony Romo - 23/30, 249 yards, 3 TD
- TB – Josh Freeman - 17/27, 148 yards, TD

Top rushers

- DAL – Felix Jones - 22 carries, 108 yards
- TB – Josh Freeman - 4 carries, 37 yards

Top receivers

- DAL – Miles Austin - 5 receptions, 53 yards, TD
- TB - Kregg Lumpkin - 5 receptions, 50 yards

Top tacklers

- DAL – Orlando Scandrick – 5 tackles, 1 assist
- TB – Mason Foster – 5 tackles, 3 assists

==== Week 16: vs. Philadelphia Eagles ====
Week Sixteen: Philadelphia Eagles at Dallas Cowboys – Game summary

Quarter	1	2	3	4	Total
Eagles	7	7	3	3	20
Cowboys	0	0	0	7	7

at Cowboys Stadium, Arlington, Texas

- Date: December 24
- Game time: 3:15 p.m. CST
- Game weather: Played indoors (retractable roof closed)
- Game attendance: 84,834
- Referee: Bill Leavy
- TV announcers (Fox): Joe Buck, Troy Aikman and Pam Oliver

Game information

First quarter

- PHI - Brent Celek 13-yard pass from Michael Vick (Alex Henery kick), 11:30. Eagles 7-0. Drive: 8 plays, 80 yards, 3:30.

Second quarter

- PHI - Jeremy Maclin 5-yard pass from Michael Vick (Alex Henery kick), 0:05. Eagles 14-0. Drive: 6 plays, 87 yards, 0:50.

Third quarter

- PHI - Alex Henery 43-yard field goal, 4:30. Eagles 17-0. Drive: 5 plays, 34 yards, 2:27.

Fourth quarter

- PHI - Alex Henery 51-yard field goal, 13:25. Eagles 20-0. Drive: 9 plays, 26 yards, 4:28.
- DAL - Miles Austin 4-yard pass from Stephen McGee (Dan Bailey kick), 0:07. Eagles 20-7. Drive: 2 plays, 16 yards, 0:12.

Top passers

- PHI – Michael Vick - 18/32, 293 yards, 2 TD
- DAL – Stephen McGee - 24/38, 182 yards, TD

Top rushers

- PHI – LeSean McCoy - 13 carries, 35 yards
- DAL – Sammy Morris - 13 carries, 29 yards

Top receivers

- PHI – DeSean Jackson - 5 receptions, 90 yards
- DAL – Dez Bryant - 6 receptions, 62 yards

Top tacklers

- PHI – Nnamdi Asomugha - 8 tackles
- DAL – Anthony Spencer - 6 tackles

==== Week 17: at New York Giants ====
Week Seventeen: Dallas Cowboys at New York Giants – Game summary

Quarter	1	2	3	4	Total
Cowboys	0	0	7	7	14
Giants	7	14	0	10	31

at MetLife Stadium, East Rutherford, New Jersey

- Date: January 1
- Game time: 8:20 p.m. EST/7:20 p.m. CST
- Game weather: 48 °F (9 °C) (Rain Showers)
- Game attendance: 81,077
- Referee: Walt Anderson
- TV announcers (NBC): Al Michaels, Cris Collinsworth, & Michele Tafoya

Game information

First quarter

- NYG – Victor Cruz 74-yard pass from Eli Manning (Lawrence Tynes kick), 4:57. Giants 7–0. Drive: 6 plays, 96 yards, 2:49.

Second quarter

- NYG – Ahmad Bradshaw 5-yard run (Lawrence Tynes kick), 13:27. Giants 14–0. Drive: 10 plays, 68 yards, 4:27.
- NYG – Ahmad Bradshaw 10-yard pass from Eli Manning (Lawrence Tynes kick), 1:09. Giants 21–0. Drive: 8 plays, 80 yards, 3:24.

Third quarter

- DAL – Laurent Robinson 34-yard pass from Tony Romo (Dan Bailey kick), 6:54. Giants 21–7. Drive: 9 plays, 94 yards, 4:28.

Fourth quarter

- DAL – Laurent Robinson 6-yard pass from Tony Romo (Dan Bailey kick), 10:15. Giants 21–14. Drive: 3 plays, 26 yards, 1:25.
- NYG – Lawrence Tynes 28-yard field goal, 5:45. Giants 24–14. Drive: 9 plays, 65 yards, 4:30.
- NYG – Hakeem Nicks 4-yard pass from Eli Manning (Lawrence Tynes kick), 3:41. Giants 31–14. Drive: 4 plays, 45 yards, 1:14.

Top passers

- DAL – Tony Romo – 29/37, 289 yards, 2 TD, INT
- NYG – Eli Manning – 24/33, 346 yards, 3 TD

Top rushers

- DAL – Felix Jones – 11 carries, 30 yards
- NYG – Ahmad Bradshaw – 16 carries, 57 yards, TD

Top receivers

- DAL – Dez Bryant – 6 receptions, 70 yards
- NYG – Victor Cruz – 6 receptions, 178 yards, TD

Top tacklers

- DAL – Sean Lee - 11 tackles, 3 assists
- NYG – Michael Boley - 9 tackles, 2 assists

With the loss, the Cowboys finished at 8–8 and missed the playoffs for a second consecutive year.

=== Standings ===
NFC East
	W	L	T	PCT	DIV	CONF	PF	PA	STK
^{(4)} New York Giants	9	7	0	.563	3–3	5–7	394	400	W2
Philadelphia Eagles	8	8	0	.500	5–1	6–6	396	328	W4
Dallas Cowboys	8	8	0	.500	2–4	6–6	369	347	L2
Washington Redskins	5	11	0	.313	2–4	5–7	288	367	L2
