= Kevin Kowalski =

Kevin Kowalski may refer to:

- Kevin Kowalski (skateboarder) (born 1992), American skateboarder
- Kevin Kowalski (American football) (born 1989), American football center
