= Kevin Kowalski (American football) =

American football player (born 1989)

No. 60
- Position: Center / Guard

Personal information
- Born: January 2, 1989 (age 37); Bedford, Ohio, U.S.
- Listed height: 6 ft 3 in (1.91 m)
- Listed weight: 298 lb (135 kg)

Career information
- High school: Nordonia (Macedonia, Ohio)
- College: Toledo
- NFL draft: 2011: undrafted

Career history
- Dallas Cowboys (2011–2012); Washington Redskins (2014)*
- * Offseason or practice squad member only

Career NFL statistics
- Games played: 12
- Stats at Pro Football Reference

Kevin Victor Kowalski (born January 2, 1989) is an American former professional football player who was a center for the Dallas Cowboys of the National Football League (NFL). He was signed by the Cowboys as an undrafted free agent in 2011. He played college football for the Toledo Rockets.

== Early life ==
Kowalski attended Nordonia High School. As a senior, he was a two-way tackle, registering 75 tackles and 10 sacks, while contributing to an 8-1 record. He received first-team Division II All-Ohio honors and was invited to play in the Big 33 Football Classic.

He also practiced track, competing in the shot put and discus throw.

== College career ==
Kowalski accepted a football scholarship from the University of Toledo. As a true freshman, he was a backup at right guard, contributing to the team ranking nationally first in total offense (448.4 yards-per-game) and rushing (209.2). The offense also ranked nationally second in scoring (32.9 points-per-game) and tied for 19th in sacks allowed (16).

As a sophomore, he started all 12 games at right guard, as part of an offensive line that ranked 24th in the nation with 16 sacks allowed.

As a junior, he was switched to center and started all 12 games, contributing to an offense that ranked 16th in the nation in total offense (437.9 yards-per-game) and 18th in passing offense (278.1 yards-per-game). As a senior, he started all 13 games center.

== Professional career ==
=== Dallas Cowboys ===
Kowalski was signed as an undrafted free agent by the Dallas Cowboys after the 2011 NFL draft on July 26. On September 18, he replaced an injured Phil Costa in the fourth quarter against the San Francisco 49ers, contributing to an overtime win. On October 16, he replaced an injured Bill Nagy against the New England Patriots. On December 11, against the New York Giants, he replaced an injured Phil Costa in the second quarter. On January 1, he replaced an injured Kyle Kosier against the New York Giants. He played mainly on special teams as a rookie.

He began the 2012 season on the Cowboys' physically unable to perform list with an ankle injury. He was activated on November 17 and was dressed for three games, but was also declared inactive in three others.

In the 2013 training camp, he was tried at offensive guard and fullback, but suffered a bruised knee in practice that limited his playing time. He was waived on August 31.

He now coaches the Coram Deo Lions.

=== Washington Redskins ===
On January 8, 2014, the Washington Redskins signed Kowalski to a futures contract. He was released on August 29.

== Personal life ==
After becoming a Christian in 2014 and attending seminary, Kevin currently serves as Men’s Minister at Rockpointe Church in Flower Mound, Texas.
