= Bill Nagy =

Bill Nagy may refer to:

- Bill Nagy (American football)
- Bill Nagy (actor)
