= Radway (disambiguation) =

Radway is a village and civil parish in Warwickshire, England

Radway may also refer to:

- Radway, Alberta, a hamlet in Alberta, Canada

== People with the surname ==
- Janice Radway (born 1949), American literary critic and writer
- Raymond Radway (born 1987), American football player
