= Montrae Holland =

American football player (born 1980)

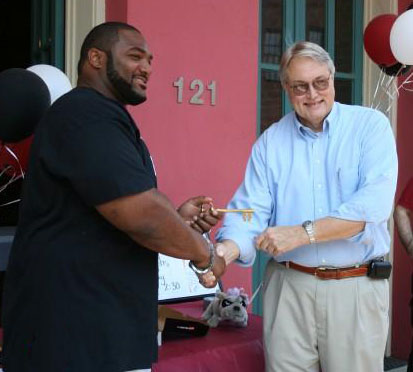
- Holland (left) presented with the key to his hometown, Jefferson, Texas.

No. 61, 70, 64
- Position: Guard

Personal information
- Born: May 21, 1980 (age 46); Jefferson, Texas, U.S.
- Listed height: 6 ft 2 in (1.88 m)
- Listed weight: 340 lb (154 kg)

Career information
- High school: Jefferson
- College: Florida State
- NFL draft: 2003: 4th round, 102nd overall pick

Career history
- New Orleans Saints (2003–2006); Denver Broncos (2007); Dallas Cowboys (2008–2011)

Awards and highlights
- BCS national champion (1999); Third-team All-American (2002); First-team All-ACC (2002); Second-team All-ACC (2001)

Career NFL statistics
- Games played: 99
- Games started: 60
- Fumble recoveries: 1
- Stats at Pro Football Reference

Montrae Rondrell Holland (born May 21, 1980) is an American former professional football player who was an offensive guard in the National Football League (NFL) for the New Orleans Saints, Denver Broncos and Dallas Cowboys. He played college football for the Florida State Seminoles.

== Early life ==
Holland was born in Jefferson, Texas with a defect in his right leg which he had corrected in seventh grade. Doctors had to break his leg and fuse his growth plates together on both legs, which stunted his growth, which made it so he could not grow any more.

Holland attended Jefferson High School, where he was an offensive guard in football and also practiced track.

Holland accepted a football scholarship from Florida State University. As a redshirt freshman, he was a backup at right guard. As a sophomore, Holland started all 13 games at right guard and did not allow a sack. He contributed to the team leading the nation in passing (384 yards per game) and scoring offense (42.4 points per game).

As a junior, Holland started every game at right guard, while allowing only two sacks. As a senior, he started the first 10 games at right guard.

Holland was a three-year starter and registered a streak of 29 consecutive starts at offensive guard. He received All-conference honors in every year he started for the school.

== Professional career ==
Pre-draft measurables
Height	Weight	Arm length	Hand span	20-yard shuttle	Three-cone drill	Bench press
6 ft 1 in (1.85 m)	333 lb (151 kg)	32 1/2 in (0.83 m)	10 1/2 in (0.27 m)	5.13 s	8.46 s	30 reps
All values from NFL Combine.

=== New Orleans Saints ===
Holland was selected by the New Orleans Saints in the fourth round (102nd overall) of the 2003 NFL draft. He appeared in all 16 games (seven starts) as a rookie. After playing the first nine games on special teams, Holland filled in at left guard for four games for an injured Kendyl Jacox, before switching to right guard to replace an injured LeCharles Bentley for the last two contests.

In 2004, Holland was named the full-time starter at right guard, missing three games with a torn ligament in his right knee, that he suffered in the eleventh game, against the Atlanta Falcons. He contributed to Deuce McAllister's third consecutive 1,000-yard season.

In 2005, Holland began the season as reserve for the first three games, before starting seven games at right guard in place of free agent-bust Jermane Mayberry and three games at left guard. In 2006, he was a backup at guard and was declared inactive in two playoff games.

=== Denver Broncos ===
On March 3, 2007, Holland signed as a free agent with the Denver Broncos. He passed Chris Kuper on the depth chart and started 16 games at right guard.

In 2008, Holland reported to training camp out of shape and lost his starter position to Kuper. On August 28, Holland was traded to the Dallas Cowboys in exchange for a fifth-round pick (#158-Matt Tennant) in the 2010 NFL draft.

=== Dallas Cowboys ===
In 2008, the Dallas Cowboys acquired Holland because they needed depth in the offensive line after Kyle Kosier missed 13 games with a foot injury. He appeared in seven games (two starts)

In 2009, the Cowboys tried to convert Holland into a backup center, but because this was a new position to him, he was not effective. He was declared inactive for all 16 regular season games and in two playoff contests.

In 2010, Holland was mostly a reserve player, starting two games at left guard in place of an injured Kosier.

In 2011, Holland was released before the season started because he was out of shape. On October 18, he was re-signed after both Derrick Dockery and rookie Bill Nagy went down with injuries. Holland started 10 games at left guard and was a key player on the offensive line, before suffering a partially torn left biceps. On December 26, he was placed on the injured reserve list. In 2012, the Cowboys could not agree with Holland on a new contract and he decided instead not to play professional football.

== Personal life ==
On June 24, 2008, Holland was presented by Mayor Bob Avery with the key to his hometown Jefferson, Texas, for his generous contributions over the years to the community, including his support of the Marion County Youth Football league.
