= Teddy Williams (American football) =

American football player (born 1988)

Teddy Williams Jr
No. 16, 21, 24, 29
- Position: Cornerback

Personal information
- Born: July 3, 1988 (age 38); Tyler, Texas, U.S.
- Listed height: 6 ft 2 in (1.88 m)
- Listed weight: 210 lb (95 kg)

Career information
- High school: John Tyler (Tyler, Texas)
- College: UTSA
- NFL draft: 2010: undrafted

Career history
- Dallas Cowboys (2010–2011); Sacramento Mountain Lions (2012); Indianapolis Colts (2012); Arizona Cardinals (2013–2014); Chicago Bears (2014); Jacksonville Jaguars (2014); Carolina Panthers (2015–2017); New York Giants (2018)*
- * Offseason or practice squad member only

Career NFL statistics
- Games played: 36
- Total tackles: 22
- Forced fumbles: 1
- Interceptions: 1
- Receptions: 1
- Receiving yards: 51
- Stats at Pro Football Reference

Teddy Williams Jr. (born July 3, 1988) is an American former professional football player who was a cornerback in the National Football League (NFL). Over his nine-season career, he was a member of several teams, including the Dallas Cowboys, Indianapolis Colts, Arizona Cardinals, Chicago Bears, Jacksonville Jaguars, and Carolina Panthers. He also had a brief stint with the New York Giants. Williams did not play college football; instead, he competed in track and field at the University of Texas at San Antonio (UTSA), where he was a four-time NCAA All-American sprinter.

== Early life ==
Williams attended John Tyler High School, where he competed in football, track and baseball. In football, he was a three-time All-district selection at wide receiver and received second-team All-state honors as a junior.

He received second-team all-state honors as a junior and was a three-time all-district performer in football. As a senior, he suffered a serious ankle injury, that impacted his playing time and his scholarship offers.

== College career ==
Williams accepted a track and field scholarship for the University of Texas at San Antonio. As a sophomore in 2008, he began to catch his stride. He finished the indoor season ranked #10 in the nation in the indoor 60 m with a time of 6.66 seconds. The propelled Williams into a ground breaking outdoor season which saw him drop a personal best at the time of 10.16 at the 2008 Southland Conference Outdoor Championships, and he also earned his first All American honor finishing 7th in an Olympic caliber loaded field at the 2008 NCAA Outdoor Championships at Drake University in Iowa. Later that summer Williams was invited to compete in the 2008 USA Olympic Track and Field Trials in Eugene, Oregon. He finished 10th overall and was invited to represent Team USA in Toluca, Mexico and run on the 4 × 100 m relay. Williams and company blazed around the track in Mexico to a World leading time of 38.30 seconds. With that time the quartet was invited to Beijing, China to represent Team USA in the preliminary round of the 4 × 100 m relay. Due to a batched exchange in the finals of the event, Team USA was disqualified, thus ending Williams' chance of bringing home an Olympic medal.

As a junior in 2009, he recorded a 6.59 seconds personal best in the 60 m at the NCAA Indoor Championships at Texas A&M in College Station. Later that season he also recorded a time of 9.90 seconds in the 100 meters at the UTEP Invitational, that ranked as the best in school history and the fastest time in the WORLD that season for over four months.

As a senior in 2010, Williams held the #4 fastest indoor 60 m time in the nation at 6.59 seconds and the #1 100 m time in the NCAA that season at 10.01 seconds. Which was run at the Southland Conference Outdoor Track and Field Championships in Arlington, Texas. He holds the school record with his personal best of 9.90 seconds, that won the 2009 Southland Conference title. He also helped the 4 × 100 m relay team run a season-best time of 39.59 seconds in 2010.

Williams cemented his legacy and finished up his collegiate career as the most decorated athlete in UTSA history, where as a sprinter, he was the school's first time four-time All-American, won nine Southland Conference titles (five indoor/four outdoor), received four Southland Conference athlete of the year awards (two indoor/two outdoor) and contributed to the school winning six Southland Conference Team Championships (four indoor/two outdoor) from 2007 to 2010. He also set school marks in the 55 metres (6.23a), 60 metres (Conference-best 6.59), 100 metres (9.90), 200 metres (20.60) and 400 metres relay (39.59).

=== Personal bests ===
Event	Time (seconds)	Venue	Date				
55 meters	6.23	Lubbock, Texas	January 23, 2010				
60 meters	6.59	College Station, Texas	March 13, 2009				
100 meters	9.90	El Paso, Texas	April 11, 2009	200 meters	20.60	Huntsville, Texas	May 11, 2008
400 meters	48.90	Irvine, California	March 21, 2009				

== Professional career ==
=== Dallas Cowboys ===
In 2010, Williams became UTSA’s first ever NFL player. The Dallas Cowboys were having their training camp in San Antonio and Williams, who had just finished his senior season and still had one more year of eligibility in a different sport, got a tryout in part because he was attending a local school and because of the relationship between University of Texas at San Antonio's assistant Eric Roark and the Cowboys' director of scouting Tom Ciskowski. Although he did not play football in college, the Cowboys were intrigued by his size/speed ratio and signed him as an undrafted free agent after a try-out on July 31.

In 2010, the Cowboys weren't sure where to play Williams, trying him at cornerback before settling on wide receiver. He was with the team for the entire preseason, and was waived on September 4, before being signed to their practice squad. On December 21, he was promoted to the active roster, to avoid losing him to the Miami Dolphins.

During the Dallas Cowboys' 2011 training camp, he was hindered by a hamstring injury he suffered after a collision with assistant Jimmy Robinson, and was released on September 3. He spent the 2011 season on the Cowboys' practice squad.

He was re-signed to a future's contract on January 2, 2012. During training camp, he was moved from wide receiver to cornerback, but couldn't make the team and was released on August 31.

=== Sacramento Mountain Lions (UFL) ===
In 2012, he was signed by the Sacramento Mountain Lions of the United Football League (UFL). He spent an abbreviated six-game season as a starter and cornerback and returning kickoffs (one return for touchdown).

=== Indianapolis Colts ===
On October 24, 2012, he worked out for the Indianapolis Colts and was signed to their practice squad five days later. On November 16, he was promoted to the active roster. He was waived-injured on August 25, 2013.

=== 2013 season ===
Williams signed with the Arizona Cardinals on October 21, 2013. The Cardinals switched him from cornerback to wide receiver. On October 27, during a 27-13 victory over the Atlanta Falcons, Williams caught a 51-yard pass from quarterback Carson Palmer. The reception was the first of his career. On November 17, during a game against the Jacksonville Jaguars, he tore his achilles and was placed on injured reserve.

=== 2014 season ===
It was announced that the Cardinals would be moving Williams back to the cornerback position. He was released on August 30, 2014, and was later signed to the practice squad on September 9.

=== Chicago Bears ===
On October 1, 2014, he was signed by the Chicago Bears from the Cardinals' practice squad. He was released on November 10, after appearing in five games and registering two special teams tackles.

=== Jacksonville Jaguars ===
On November 11, 2014, he was claimed off waivers by the Jacksonville Jaguars. He played in two games and was declared inactive for four. He was not re-signed after the season ended.

=== Carolina Panthers ===
On March 12, 2015, Williams signed a two-year, $2.3 million, contract with the Carolina Panthers. He played in his first full season and found a place on the special teams units where he became captain. He also played some snaps at cornerback, recording 13 defensive tackles, five passes defensed and one forced fumble.

On February 7, 2016, Williams was a captain of the Panthers team that finished as one of the best regular season teams in NFL history with a record of 15-1 and also played in Super Bowl 50. In the game, the Panthers fell to the Denver Broncos by a score of 24–10. On October 28, Williams was placed on injured reserve with a knee injury after recording a game changing interception against Drew Brees and the Saints.

On March 20, 2017, Williams re-signed with the Panthers on a one-year $1.1 million contract. On September 1, 2017, he was placed on injured reserve with a shoulder injury. On March 7, 2018, Williams was released by the Panthers.

=== New York Giants ===
On March 14, 2018, Williams signed a one year, $1.3 million contract with the New York Giants. On August 6, Williams requested his release from the Giants to deal with personal and family health issues.

== Personal life ==
He married his college sweetheart who was a three-time All American sprinter herself and they have three children (Dymiand, Christian and Tatiana) together. He is a member of the Omega Psi Phi fraternity; he joined the Alpha Delta Lambda chapter at the University of Texas at San Antonio, and was an undergraduate member of that chapter.

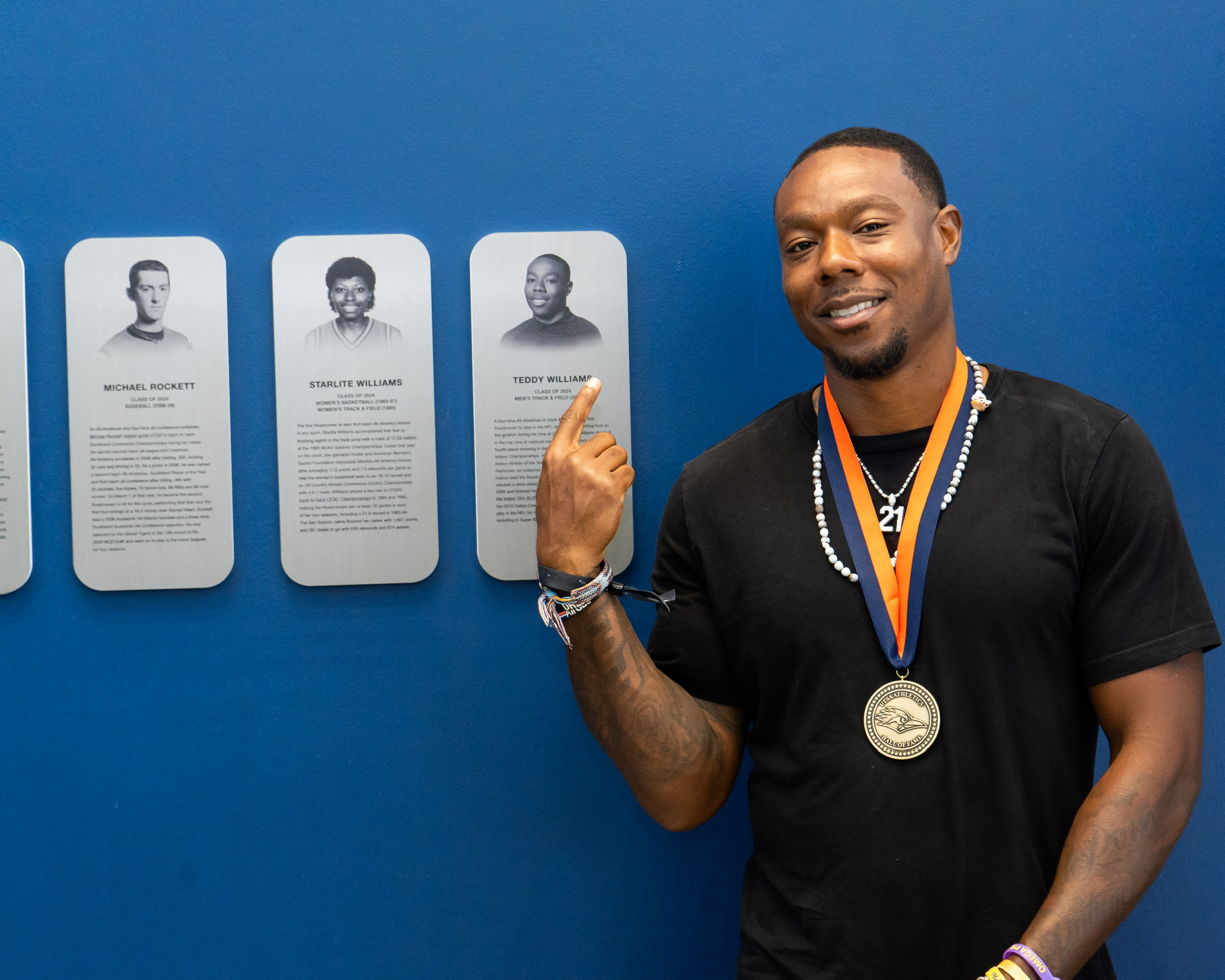

On Friday October 18, 2024, Williams was inducted into the UTSA Athletics Hall of Fame. He and four others were inducted as the second ever Hall of Fame class in university history.

Williams hosted the “Fast Like Teddy” speed and agility camp every summer in his hometown of Tyler, Texas for 10 consecutive years. The camp was free to all participants and averaged over 350 athletes annually. Williams stated that investing in the next generation of young athletes is a primary interest.
