= Phil Costa (American football) =

American football player (born 1987)

No. 67
- Positions: Center, Guard

Personal information
- Born: July 11, 1987 (age 39); Moorestown Township, New Jersey, U.S.
- Listed height: 6 ft 3 in (1.91 m)
- Listed weight: 302 lb (137 kg)

Career information
- High school: Holy Cross (Delran Township, New Jersey)
- College: Maryland
- NFL draft: 2010: undrafted

Career history
- Dallas Cowboys (2010–2013); Indianapolis Colts (2014)*
- * Offseason or practice squad member only

Career NFL statistics
- Games played: 26
- Games started: 20
- Stats at Pro Football Reference

Phil Costa (born July 11, 1987) is an American former professional football player who was a center in the National Football League (NFL) for the Dallas Cowboys. He played college football for the Maryland Terrapins.

== Early life ==
Costa attended Holy Cross High School. He was a starting left guard, who played in every game during his three seasons on the team.

He was a three-time All-County and two-time All-parochial selection. He received a first-team All-South New Jersey, All-East region and second-team All-state honors as a senior.

== College career ==
Costa accepted a football scholarship from the University of Maryland, College Park. As a sophomore, he appeared in all 13 games with six starts (5 at left guard and one at right guard).

As a junior, he appeared in all 13 games, starting the final 12 contests at right guard. He contributed to running back Da'Rel Scott becoming the seventh player in school history to rush for over 1,000 yards in a season and Chris Turner (American football) to pass for the seventh-highest single-season mark in school history (2,516 yards).

As a senior, he was switched to center to replace the recently graduated Edwin Williams and started all 12 games.

== Professional career ==
=== Dallas Cowboys ===
Costa was signed by the Dallas Cowboys as an undrafted free agent after the 2010 NFL draft. He began as the fourth-string center, with five-time Pro Bowler Andre Gurode, Kyle Kosier and Travis Bright ahead of him, but when Kosier got hurt and Bright struggled, Costa became the primary backup. He impressed the coaching staff and made the opening day 53-man roster. As a rookie, he earned his first career start at left guard in place of the injured Kosier and Montrae Holland, in the seventh game of the season against the Jacksonville Jaguars.

In 2011, he performed well during training camp and preseason, before suffering a strained right posterior cruciate ligament on August 24. After contract restructuring negotiations fell through, Gurode was cut before the fourth preseason game and Costa became the starting center for the year. Because of his small size for the position, as the season wore on, he was exposed and struggled in his blocking assignments against bigger defenders.

In 2012, the Cowboys signed free agents guards Mackenzy Bernadeau and Nate Livings to help protect Costa against stronger defensive fronts. Ryan Cook replaced him in the season opener after one series, because he was limited by a back injury he carried from training camp. He returned to play against the Baltimore Ravens and arguably had his best game as a professional, with the Ravens yielding a franchise record 227 rushing yards. In the next game against the Carolina Panthers, he suffered a dislocated ankle and was eventually placed on the injured reserve list on December 5, after playing only six quarters in the season.

Looking to improve the center position, the Cowboys selected Travis Frederick in the first round of the 2013 NFL draft and moved Costa to a backup role during training camp. He was eventually waived in a salary cap move on March 7, 2014.

=== Indianapolis Colts ===
On March 13, 2014, Costa signed a two-year contract with the Indianapolis Colts. He retired at the age of 26 on April 21.
