= Derrick Dockery =

American football player (born 1980)

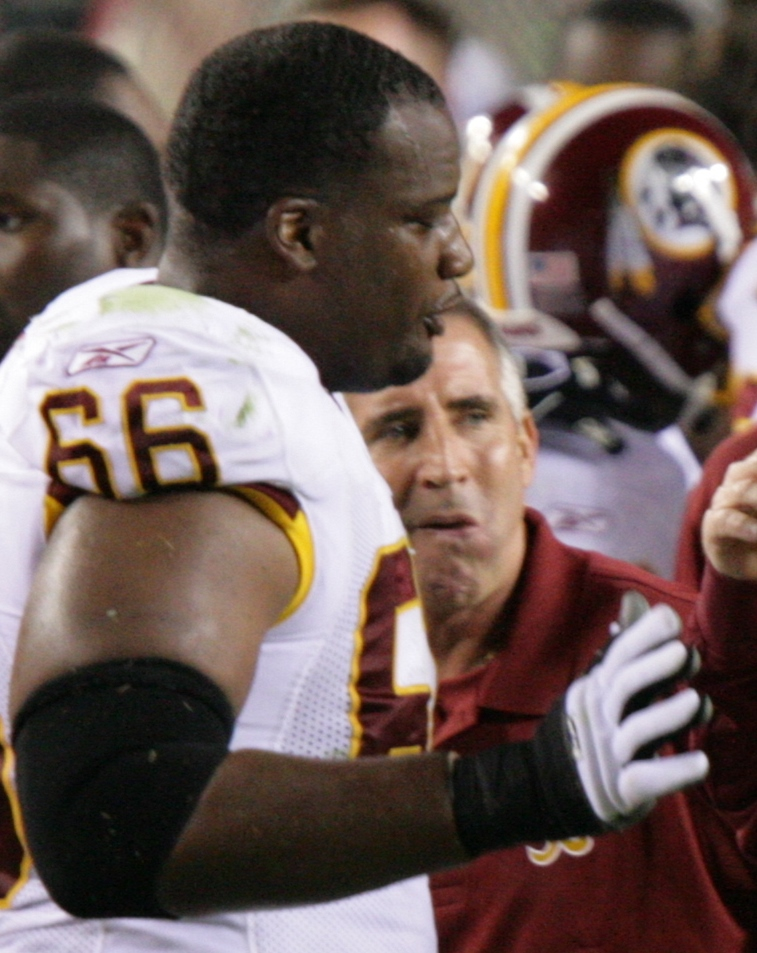
- Dockery with the Washington Redskins in 2006

No. 66, 75, 76
- Position: Guard

Personal information
- Born: September 7, 1980 (age 46); Garland, Texas, U.S.
- Listed height: 6 ft 6 in (1.98 m)
- Listed weight: 325 lb (147 kg)

Career information
- High school: Lakeview Centennial (Garland)
- College: Texas
- NFL draft: 2003: 3rd round, 81st overall pick

Career history
- Washington Redskins (2003−2006); Buffalo Bills (2007−2008); Washington Redskins (2009−2010); Dallas Cowboys (2011−2012)

Awards and highlights
- Consensus All-American 2002); First-team All-Big 12 (2002)

Career NFL statistics
- Games played: 141
- Games started: 115
- Fumble recoveries: 4
- Stats at Pro Football Reference

Derrick Dewayne Dockery (born September 7, 1980) is an American former professional football player who was a guard in the National Football League (NFL). He played college football for the Texas Longhorns and was selected by the Washington Redskins in the third round of the 2003 NFL draft. He also played for He has also played for the Buffalo Bills and Dallas Cowboys.

== Early life ==
Dockery was born in Dallas County, Texas. He attended Lakeview Centennial High School in Garland, Texas, where he played football for the Lakeview Patriots.

As a senior in 1998, he was tabbed as a second-team All-USA offensive lineman by USA Today, and second-team Class 5A all-state selection by the Texas Sports Writers Association. He was a two-time first-team all-district performer at offensive tackle.

== College career ==
Dockery played football for coach Mack Brown at the University of Texas at Austin from 1999 t0 2002.

As a true freshman in 1999, he served as a backup offensive guard, but saw action in all 14 games, including the Cotton Bowl Classic, at both guard spots and on special teams. He helped the Longhorns win the Big 12 South, go to the Big 12 Championship game and the Cotton Bowl and finish ranked #21/#23.

As a sophomore in 2000, he started in all 12 games at guard, including the Holiday Bowl. He helped pave the way for a Longhorns offense that averaged 38.6 points per game, rose to as high as #5 in the rankings and finished ranked #12, the program's best end of season ranking in a decade.

As a junior in 2001, he played in all 13 games, and started nine contests at both guard spots, also seeing action at tackle. His line play contributed to the Longhorns leading the Big 12 Conference with 39.2 points per game (sixth in NCAA) and averaging 162.3 yards rushing, 250.3 passing, and 412.6 total yards per game. He helped the Longhorns win the Big 12 South and rise to a #3 ranking. A loss by #2 Florida earlier in the day meant that going into the Big 12 Championship the Longhorns were playing for a berth in the Rose Bowl and a shot at the BCS Championship, but they were upset. They went to the 2001 Holiday Bowl instead where they came back from a 16-point 2nd half deficit to beat the Washington Huskies. They finished ranked #5, the Longhorns highest end of season ranking since 1983.

As a senior in 2002, Dockery started all 13 games, seven at right guard and six at right tackle, while not allowing a sack. He helped the Longhorns win a share of the Big 12 South - missing out on the Big 12 Championship by a razor thin margin in the BCS rankings (0.0128 of a point) - and the 2003 Cotton Bowl Classic. He was named a first-team All-Big 12 selection and recognized as a consensus first-team All-American, after receiving first-team honors from the Associated Press, Football Writers Association of America and Walter Camp Football Foundation. He shared the Longhorns' Outstanding Offensive Lineman Award and was a key member of a Longhorn offense that ranked fifth in the Big 12 and 16th nationally in scoring offense (33.8 points per game).

During his career, the team had a 40–12 record, including back-to-back 11–2 seasons and a top six ranking in 2001 and 2002. He played 52 consecutive games with 31 starts (25 at guard and 6 at tackle).

In 2018, he was inducted into the University of Texas Hall of Honor.

== Professional career ==
Pre-draft measurables
Height	Weight	Arm length	Hand span	40-yard dash	Vertical jump	Broad jump	Wonderlic
6 ft 6 in (1.98 m)	347 lb (157 kg)	35 1/8 in (0.89 m)	10 1/8 in (0.26 m)	5.35 s	25 in (0.64 m)	7 ft 8 in (2.34 m)	13
40-yard dash value was taken at Texas Pro Day; all other values are from the 2003 NFL Scouting Combine.

=== Washington Redskins (first stint) ===
Dockery was selected in the third round (81st overall) of the 2003 NFL draft by the Washington Redskins.

In 2003, he began his rookie season as a backup at several positions along the offensive line, including left guard and right tackle. He was inserted into the starting lineup in Week 4 against the New England Patriots at left guard, which was his first career NFL start. He would go on to start the final 13 games of the regular season at left guard.

In 2004, he started all 16 games at left guard for the Redskins, teaming with left tackle Chris Samuels to form a solid tandem on the left side of the offensive line. He finished the season having garnered 29 consecutive starts at left guard, although he was one of the league leaders in false starts.

He continued to start every game for the 2005 and 2006 seasons. In 2005 he also started the Redskins two playoff games, helping them win their Wild Card game.

=== Buffalo Bills ===
On March 2, 2007, the Buffalo Bills signed Dockery to a 7-year $49 million contract with an $18 million signing bonus, the third largest in NFL history at his position. He was a two-year starter at left guard (32 games) and was part of one of the NFL's biggest offensive lines in terms of height and weight. In 2008, the unit struggled in pass protection (allowed 38 sacks) and the offense ranked 25th in the league in total yards. He was released in a salary-cap move on February 26, 2009.

=== Washington Redskins (second stint) ===
On March 1, 2009, Dockery re-signed with the Redskins to a 5-year, $26.5 million contract. He started 16 games at left guard, replacing free agent Pete Kendall. In 2010, he lost his starting role after struggling playing in new head coach Mike Shanahan's zone blocking scheme. He was declared inactive in weeks 5-10 with an injury and again for last seven games of the season after he injured his left knee against the Tennessee Titans.

He was released on March 1, 2011.

=== Dallas Cowboys ===
On September 4, 2011, Dockery was signed by the Dallas Cowboys when they cut Montrae Holland for being out of shape. After not playing in the first game, he started the second against the San Francisco 49ers in place of an injured Bill Nagy, but suffered a sprained medial collateral ligament and a tibial plateau fracture. He recovered in week 8 and came in to back up Holland, who had been re-signed following the injuries to Nagy and Dockery. He started the last game of the season after Holland partially tore his left bicep.

On August 3, 2012, he was signed to be the backup guard to Mackenzy Bernadeau after injuries to the several linemen. He played in every game but one that season, mostly on special teams. Following an injury to Ryan Cook, Bernadeau was moved to center for two games and Dockery was the starting right guard.

He became a free agent after the season was over, but went unsigned.

Dockery finished his career after appearing in 141 games with 115 starts. He started his first career game in week four of the 2003 season, and went on to start 109 straight contests until 2010. He also had a stretch of 116 consecutive games.

== Personal life ==
Following retirement from football, Dockery and his wife Emma attended George Washington University for their MBAs and then Dockery went into political communications. Dockery went to work for Paul Ryan in 2012 as an intern on the House Budget Committee. In 2013 he was promoted to Communications Press Assistant for the House Budget Committee Office. In 2015 he was hired by Jason Chaffetz to be the Communications and Coalitions Coordinator for the House Committee on Oversight and Government Reform. The next year he went to work for Speaker Paul Ryan as the Business and Intergovernmental Coalitions Director for the Office of the Speaker. In 2020 he went to the private sector, working as a government relations and public affairs professional at TikTok. In 2022, he was named to the Board of Directors of Telos, an information technology and cybersecurity company located in Ashburn, Virginia.

In 2013, Dockery co-founded Yellow Ribbons United, which raises resources for service members and their families. He also serves on the Board of Directors of Paul Ryan's American Idea Foundation.

He is married to wife Emma and have three children. Famous ESPN sportscaster Chris Berman gave Dockery one of his famous nicknames: Derrick "Hickory Dickory" Dockery. His brother Cedric also played college football for the University of Texas and was an All-Big 12 2nd team and honorable mention player.
