= Andre Gurode =

American football player and coach (born 1978)

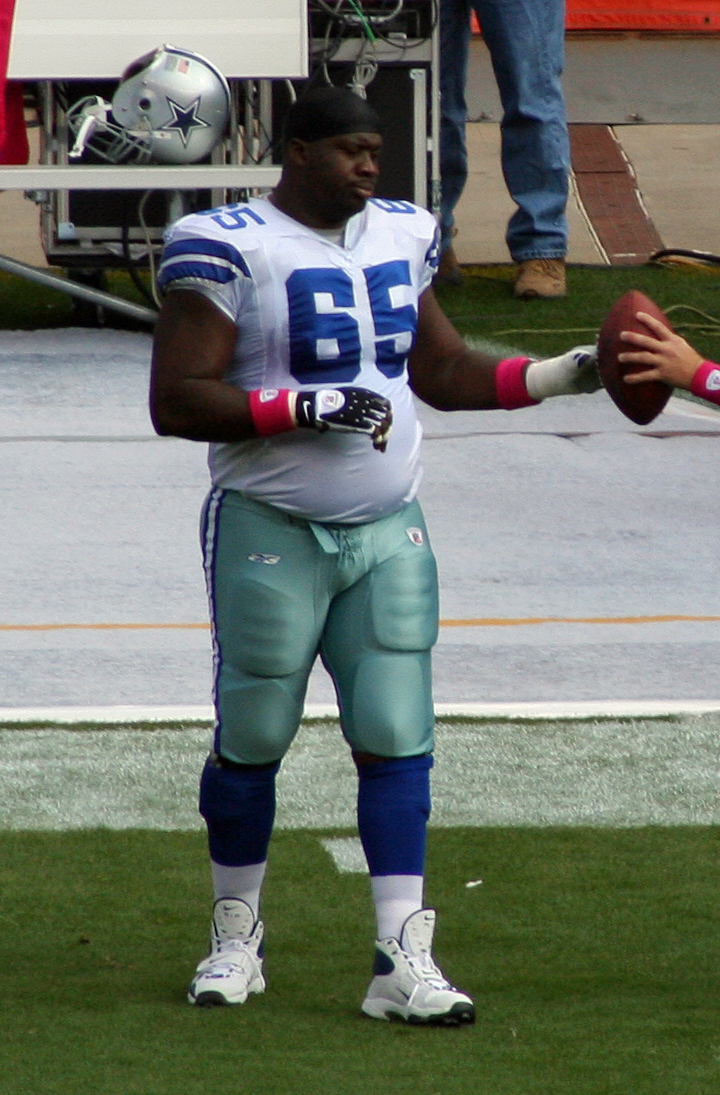
- Gurode with the Dallas Cowboys in 2009

Colorado Buffaloes
- Title: Assistant offensive line coach

Personal information
- Born: March 6, 1978 (age 48); Houston, Texas, U.S.
- Listed height: 6 ft 4 in (1.93 m)
- Listed weight: 320 lb (145 kg)

Career information
- High school: North Shore (Houston, Texas)
- College: Colorado (1998–2001)
- NFL draft: 2002: 2nd round, 37th overall pick

Career history

Playing
- Dallas Cowboys (2002–2010); Baltimore Ravens (2011); Chicago Bears (2012); Oakland Raiders (2013)

Coaching
- Dallas Cowboys (2019) Defensive assistant; Houston Roughnecks (2023) Offensive line coach; San Antonio Brahmas (2024) Offensive line coach; Colorado (2025–present) Assistant offensive line coach

Awards and highlights
- First-team All-Pro (2007); Second-team All-Pro (2009); 5× Pro Bowl (2006–2010); Consensus All-American (2001); 2× First-team All-Big 12 (2000, 2001)

Career NFL statistics
- Games played: 161
- Games started: 131
- Fumble recoveries: 2
- Stats at Pro Football Reference

Andre Bernard Gurode (/dʒəˈrɒd/; born March 6, 1978) is an American football coach and former player who is the assistant offensive line coach for the Colorado Buffaloes of the Big 12 (NCAA). He played as a center and guard in the National Football League (NFL). Gurode played college football for the Colorado Buffaloes, earning consensus All-American honors. He was selected by the Dallas Cowboys in the second round of the 2002 NFL draft. During his eight seasons with Dallas, he was named to five Pro Bowls. In his final three seasons, Gurode spent one year each with the Baltimore Ravens, Chicago Bears, and Oakland Raiders.

== Early life ==
Gurode was born in Houston, Texas. He played high school football at North Shore High School in Houston. As a senior, USA Today, PrepStar and SuperPrep selected him as an honorable mention high school All-America. He was also named to the Houston Chronicle Top 100 List and made the Austin American-Statesman "Fab 55" team. He earned All-Area honors as a senior (second-team honors as a junior), and was All-District and All-Greater Houston as a junior and senior (when he also was his team's most outstanding offensive lineman).

Gurode lettered three times in basketball and four times in track with personal bests of 186' 0" in the discus and 54' 1" in the shot put.

== College career ==
Gurode attended the University of Colorado, where he played for the Colorado Buffaloes football team from 1998 to 2001. He was a four-year starter for the Buffaloes, playing both center and guard on the offensive line. He started his first two and a half seasons at center, before moving to guard in the middle of his junior year. As a junior in 2000, he started the first six games of the year at center and the final five games at guard. He received the John Mack Award, as selected by the coaches for being Colorado's most outstanding offensive player and was also selected honorable mention All-Big 12 Conference honors while helping the Buffaloes to a 7–5 record and a win over the Boston College Eagles in the Insight.com Bowl. As a senior, he started every game at right guard.

Gurode was a first-team All-Big 12 selection in 2000 and 2001, and was recognized as a consensus first-team All-American as a senior in 2001. During his career he allowed just 7.5 sacks in 2,653 plays as a starter for the Buffaloes.

He earned a degree in ethnic studies from the University of Colorado, where he was a member of the school's "Academic Starters" team.

He was named to the CU Athletic Hall of Fame in the 2023 Class.

== Professional career ==
=== Pre-draft ===
Gurode initially projected as a guard and was ranked the best available in the 2002 NFL draft, along with Kendall Simmons. He was regarded as an early second round pick,

Pre-draft measurables
Height	Weight	Arm length	Hand span	40-yard dash	10-yard split	20-yard split	20-yard shuttle	Three-cone drill	Vertical jump	Broad jump
6 ft 4 3/8 in (1.94 m)	316 lb (143 kg)	35 in (0.89 m)	11 in (0.28 m)	5.34 s	1.89 s	3.14 s	5.05 s	8.15 s	30.5 in (0.77 m)	8 ft 4 in (2.54 m)
All values from NFL Combine

=== Dallas Cowboys ===
Gurode was selected by the Dallas Cowboys in the second round, with the 37th overall pick, of the 2002 NFL draft as a center. He started fast by becoming the first rookie in club history to start at center on opening day.

It is believed 2002 was the first time an NFL franchise had five African-American starters on their offensive line, when the Cowboys lined up Gurode at center, tackles Flozell Adams and Solomon Page, guards Larry Allen and Kelvin Garmon. Gurode also became part of history as the starting center on the Cowboys offensive line that helped Emmitt Smith eclipse Walter Payton as the NFL's all-time leading rusher, playing against the Seattle Seahawks on October 27. While he started the first six games of the 2002 season at center, Gurode was moved to help compensate for the number of injuries along the offensive line, compiling another eight starts at right guard.

In 2003, Bill Parcells was hired as the Cowboys head coach and decided that Gurode's best position was at guard, starting 15 games at that position in 2003 and 13 games in 2004 with mixed results, before getting benched for the final two games.

At the start of the 2005 season, Parcells accepted he made a misjudgment by moving Gurode to guard and switched him back to center, with the Cowboys also signing Marco Rivera to take his place at guard. That season, he was a versatile backup, playing behind Al Johnson at center and Rivera at right guard. He appeared in all 16 games and started two.

In 2006, he rededicated himself to football and won the starting center job again, over Al Johnson. On October 1, 2006, in the third quarter of a game against the Tennessee Titans, Titans defensive tackle Albert Haynesworth stomped on Gurode's head. Haynesworth's cleats caused a laceration requiring thirty stitches. Haynesworth was ejected, and subsequently suspended by the NFL for five games without pay. Gurode started all 16 regular season games and one postseason game for the Cowboys in the 2006 season.

Following the 2006 season, Gurode was named to his first Pro Bowl as an injury replacement. On February 20, 2007, the Cowboys re-signed Gurode to a six-year contract worth US$30 million including a $10 million signing bonus.

Gurode developed into one of the league's most respected centers since returning to being a full-time starter in 2006. He started in 14 regular season games and one postseason game in the 2007 season. He started in all 16 games in the 2008 season. He started in all 16 games in the 2009 season. In the 2010 season, he started in all 16 regular season games. He was selected to the Sporting News All-Pro Team (2007, Pro Football Writers 2009), as well as to five straight Pro Bowls (2006, 2007, 2008, 2009, 2010). He was ranked 57th by his fellow players on the NFL Top 100 Players of 2011.

He had offseason left knee surgery and missed the 2011 season training camp and three out of four preseason games. With the emergence of second-year player Phil Costa, he was released after the preseason following failed negotiations regarding a restructured contract.

=== Baltimore Ravens ===
Gurode reportedly visited the New England Patriots before signing a 1-year, $3 million contract with the Baltimore Ravens on September 4, 2011. In the 2011 season, he appeared in 13 games and started five.

=== Chicago Bears ===
On November 27, 2012, the Chicago Bears signed Gurode after losing guards Lance Louis and Chris Spencer to injuries sustained in a game against the Minnesota Vikings on November 25. He was waived by the Bears on December 11, 2012.

=== Oakland Raiders ===
On July 26, 2013, Gurode signed with the Oakland Raiders. He played in ten games and started four for the Raiders in the 2013 season. At the end of the 2013 NFL season, Gurode became a free agent.

== Coaching career ==
Gurode was hired by the Houston Roughnecks on September 13, 2022 On January 1, 2024, it was announced the Roughnecks Staff would not be a part of the UFL Merger. He was transferred to the San Antonio Brahmas along with Wade Phillips.
