= Orie Lemon =

American football player (born 1987)

No. 58, 98, 45
- Position: Linebacker

Personal information
- Born: September 9, 1987 (age 39); Houston, Texas, U.S.
- Listed height: 6 ft 1 in (1.85 m)
- Listed weight: 243 lb (110 kg)

Career information
- High school: Yates (Houston)
- College: Oklahoma State
- NFL draft: 2011: undrafted

Career history
- Dallas Cowboys (2011–2012); Kansas City Chiefs (2013)*; Arizona Cardinals (2013)*; Dallas Cowboys (2013–2014); Kansas City Chiefs (2014)*; Tampa Bay Buccaneers (2014–2015); Kansas City Chiefs (2015)*
- * Offseason or practice squad member only

Awards and highlights
- First-team All-Big 12 (2010)

Career NFL statistics
- Games played: 26
- Total tackles: 32
- Fumble recoveries: 1
- Stats at Pro Football Reference

Orie Lemon (born September 9, 1987) is an American former professional football player who was a linebacker in the National Football League (NFL) for the Dallas Cowboys, Arizona Cardinals, Kansas City Chiefs and Tampa Bay Buccaneers. He was signed by the Dallas Cowboys as an undrafted free agent in 2011. He played college football for the Oklahoma State Cowboys.

== Early life ==
Lemon attended Jack Yates High School where he was the starting quarterback. As a junior, he registered 1,603 yards and 22 touchdowns of total offense, while helping his team to a 5-1 district and a 10-3 overall record.

As a senior, he passed for 1,214 yards and 14 touchdowns, while rushing for 600 yards and 12 touchdowns. He received Associated Press Texas Class 4A All-state, district MVP and Dallas Morning News Top 100 honors.

== College career ==
Lemon accepted a football scholarship from Oklahoma State University, where he was converted into a fullback and later into a linebacker as a freshman. He appeared in 7 games, making 3 tackles and one interception.

As a sophomore, he appeared in 5 games and had 3 tackles.

As a junior, he became a starter at middle linebacker and finished second on the team with 90 tackles. He also had 8 passes defensed, 2 forced fumbles and 2 fumble recoveries.

In 2009, he was lost for the season after tearing his ACL knee ligament during a practice. He came back the next year to post 133 tackles, which led the team and was the 12th-most in the NCAA. He also had 9 tackles for loss and 2.5 sacks. He made 13 tackles (one for loss) and one sack against the University of Texas. He had 17 tackles against Texas Tech University. He made 14 tackles in the 2010 Alamo Bowl 36-10 win over the University of Arizona.

== Professional career ==
=== Dallas Cowboys (first stint) ===
Lemon was signed as an undrafted free agent by the Dallas Cowboys after the 2011 NFL draft on July 28. He was waived on September 3 and signed to the practice squad on September 5.

On August 31, 2012, he was released and later signed to the practice squad on 1 September. He was promoted to the active roster on September 22. He was placed on the injured reserve list with a hamstring injury on November 7.

=== Kansas City Chiefs (first stint) ===
On April 18, 2013, he was signed as a free agent by the Kansas City Chiefs. He was cut on August 31.

=== Arizona Cardinals ===
On October 8, 2013, he was signed by the Arizona Cardinals to their practice squad.

=== Dallas Cowboys (second stint) ===
On November 21, 2013, the Dallas Cowboys signed him from the Arizona Cardinals practice squad to replace an injured DeVonte Holloman. He was released on December 14. He was re-signed on December 17. He appeared in 3 games but did not record any stat.

Lemon was waived injured by the Cowboys on August 30, 2014.

=== Kansas City Chiefs (second stint) ===
On October 15, 2014, he was signed by the Kansas City Chiefs to the practice squad.

=== Tampa Bay Buccaneers ===
On October 23, 2014, the Tampa Bay Buccaneers signed him from the Kansas City Chiefs practice squad and went on to play in 10 games (3 starts), registering 17 tackles and 6 special teams tackles.

He was waived on October 1, 2015. He was re-signed on October 7, before being cut again on November 17. He was re-signed on December 9, only to be released again on December 18. He started one game.

=== Kansas City Chiefs (third stint) ===
On January 5, 2016, the Kansas City Chiefs signed Lemon to their practice squad. He wasn't re-signed after the season.
