= Laurent Robinson =

American football player (born 1985)

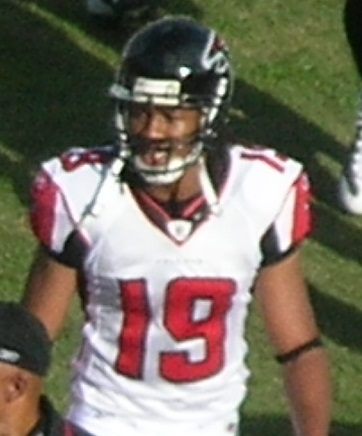
- Robinson with the Atlanta Falcons in 2008

No. 19, 11, 81, 15
- Position: Wide receiver

Personal information
- Born: May 20, 1985 (age 41); Fort Lewis, Washington, U.S.
- Listed height: 6 ft 2 in (1.88 m)
- Listed weight: 205 lb (93 kg)

Career information
- High school: Rockledge (Rockledge, Florida)
- College: Illinois State (2003–2006)
- NFL draft: 2007: 3rd round, 75th overall pick

Career history
- Atlanta Falcons (2007–2008); St. Louis Rams (2009–2010); San Diego Chargers (2011)*; Dallas Cowboys (2011); Jacksonville Jaguars (2012)
- * Offseason or practice squad member only

Awards and highlights
- First-team Little All-American (2005); 2× First-team All-GFC (2005, 2006); GFC Offensive Player of the Year (2005)

Career NFL statistics
- Games played: 59
- Receptions: 167
- Receiving yards: 2,110
- Receiving touchdowns: 15
- Stats at Pro Football Reference

Laurent Robinson (born May 20, 1985) is an American former professional football player who was a wide receiver in the National Football League (NFL) for the Atlanta Falcons, St. Louis Rams, Dallas Cowboys, and Jacksonville Jaguars. He was selected by the Falcons in the third round of the 2007 NFL draft. He played college football for the Illinois State Redbirds.

== Early life ==
Robinson attended Rockledge High School in Rockledge, Florida. As a junior, he became a regular starter with the football team, recording 6 catches for 70 yards and one touchdown. He also practiced basketball and track.

As a senior, he caught 55 passes for 903 yards and 11 touchdowns, while helping his team win back-to-back Class 3A Florida State championships in 2001 and 2002, with identical 14-1 records. He was named honorable-mention All-State, All-Space Coast and All-Conference.

Robinson was a four-year member of the football, basketball and track teams. He received a scholarship to attend Illinois State University, after his stepfather contacted the Redbirds' coaching staff; as his brother had also been recruited there a year before.

== College career ==
As a freshman at Division I-AA Illinois State University, he appeared in all 12 games with 6 starts, including the final 5 games. He ranked second on the team with 19 receptions for 260 yards (13.7-yard avg.) and 3 receiving touchdowns (tied the school freshman record).

As a sophomore in 2004, he started in all 11 games, leading the team with 44 receptions for 564 yards (12.0-yard avg.) and 7 touchdowns. He had his first career 100-yard receiving game in the season opener against Saint Xavier University.

As a junior in 2005, he was named the league's Offensive Player of the Year and a consensus All-American, after setting school single-season records with 86 receptions for 1,465 yards, a 17.0 yard average for 12 touchdowns (second in school history). He led the Division I-AA in receiving yards per game (133.18) and was second nationally with 7.82 receptions per game. He was also a finalist for the Walter Payton Award, given to the top offensive player in Division I-AA.

As a senior in 2006, he started 9 games and missed 4 contests with an ankle injury. He ranked second on the team with 40 catches for 718 yards and 7 touchdowns. In the season opener against Kansas State University, he had 9 receptions for 77 yards and 2 touchdowns, before suffering an illegal block on a fourth quarter kickoff return, that sidelined him with an ankle sprain for 2 games. He recovered to catch 6 passes for 159 yards and 2 touchdowns against Murray State University. In the fifth game against Southern Illinois University, he re-injured his ankle and was forced to miss the next two contests.

Robinson finished his college career with 37 starts out of 43 games, making 192 receptions (a school record) for 3,007 yards (a school record) and 29 receiving touchdowns. In 2009, he was voted to the Missouri Valley Football Conference quarter-century team. In 2015, he was inducted into the Illinois State Athletics Hall of Fame.

== Professional career ==
Pre-draft measurables
Height	Weight	Arm length	Hand span	40-yard dash	10-yard split	20-yard split	20-yard shuttle	Three-cone drill	Vertical jump	Broad jump	Bench press	Wonderlic
6 ft 1 in (1.85 m)	193 lb (88 kg)	32 1/4 in (0.82 m)	9 in (0.23 m)	4.41 s	1.53 s	2.50 s	4.28 s	6.83 s	39 in (0.99 m)	10 ft 7 in (3.23 m)	19 reps	15
Arm and hand sizes and Wonderlic were taken at Pro Day; all other values are from the NFL Scouting Combine.

=== Atlanta Falcons ===
After running the 40-yard dash in 4.41 seconds at the NFL Combine, he was selected by the Atlanta Falcons in the third round (75th overall) of the 2007 NFL draft.

As a rookie, he played in 15 games (six starts) and recorded 37 receptions for 437 yards (11.8 avg.) and one touchdown. In 2008, rookie Harry Douglas and the return of Brian Finneran from a two-year absence, led to Robinson falling on the depth chart. That season, he played in only six games because of head and hamstring injuries, making 5 receptions for 52 yards.

=== St. Louis Rams ===
On April 7, 2009 the Falcons traded Robinson and its fifth round (160th overall) and sixth round (196th overall) draft choices to the St. Louis Rams, in exchange for their fifth round (138th overall) and sixth round (176th overall) selections.

Robinson became a starter until he fractured his fibula on September 28, 2009 and was placed on injured reserve for the remainder of the season. At the time, he was leading the team in receptions with 13 for 167 yards.

In 2010, he had another dismissive season. He appeared in 14 games (11 starts), finishing fifth on the team with 34 receptions for 344 yards and 2 touchdowns. He became an unrestricted free agent and wasn't re-signed after the season.

=== San Diego Chargers ===
On August 3, 2011, he signed as a free agent with the San Diego Chargers. He had a disappointing preseason in which he had only 1 catch for 18 yards through the first three preseason games. Despite an impressive final preseason game in which he caught six passes for 120 yards, he was released at the end of training camp on September 3, 2011.

=== Dallas Cowboys ===
On September 7, 2011, he was signed by the Dallas Cowboys, who scouted him during the joint practices they had with the San Diego Chargers in training camp. He was released on September 13, after suffering a hamstring injury during his first practice. On September 20, he was re-signed to the roster as insurance to shore up an inexperienced wide receiver roster.

Robinson would end up having a breakout season and quickly earning the third receiver job. On October 2, he caught seven passes for 116 yards in a loss to the Detroit Lions. During the week eight loss against the Philadelphia Eagles, he had five catches for 103 yards and a touchdown, his first as a Cowboy. In the next game on November 6, Robinson again caught five passes for 32 yards and a touchdown. Robinson followed up that game with three catches, two of which were touchdowns, against the Buffalo Bills starting in place of Miles Austin, while he was recovering from a hamstring injury. From week 8 through week 12, Laurent caught 24 passes for a total of 321 yards and 7 touchdowns.

Robinson played a key role in the offense and registered career highs with 54 receptions for 858 receiving yards and a team leading 11 touchdowns. Having a one-year contract with the Cowboys, he became an unrestricted free agent at the conclusion of the season.

=== Jacksonville Jaguars ===
On March 14, 2012, he signed a five-year, $32.5 million contract with the Jacksonville Jaguars, in which 14 million was guaranteed. Although he was expected to be the team's number one receiver, he failed to impress and missed 9 games, after suffering 4 concussions and being placed on the injured reserve list on November 21. The first concussion happened in training camp, when he landed on a small strip of concrete pavers near the practice field. Robinson was later seen as a health risk and was released on March 13, 2013.
