= Shaun Chapas =

American football player (born 1988)

No. 45
- Position: Fullback

Personal information
- Born: May 2, 1988 (age 38); St. Augustine, Florida, U.S.
- Listed height: 6 ft 2 in (1.88 m)
- Listed weight: 244 lb (111 kg)

Career information
- High school: Bolles (Jacksonville, Florida)
- College: Georgia
- NFL draft: 2011: 7th round, 220th overall pick

Career history
- Dallas Cowboys (2011–2012); Detroit Lions (2012–2013); Jacksonville Jaguars (2013); Baltimore Ravens (2014)

Career NFL statistics
- Receptions: 2
- Receiving yards: 15
- Stats at Pro Football Reference

Shaun Chapas (born May 2, 1988) is an American former professional football player who was a fullback in the National Football League (NFL) for the Dallas Cowboys and Detroit Lions. He played college football for the Georgia Bulldogs.

== Early life ==
Chapas attended Bolles School, where he was named the starter at fullback as a freshman. As a junior, he had 9 rushing touchdowns on 38 carries and 2 receiving touchdowns on 9 catches, while helping his team win the Class AA state title.

As a senior, he missed the entire season after tearing his ACL. He was still rated the eighth-best fullback in the nation and fifth on the Florida Top-100 Rivals.com team.

== College career ==
Chapas accepted a football scholarship from the University of Georgia, where he was redshirted to recover from his previous injury. After being named the most improved running back at the conclusion of spring drills in 2007, he appeared in all 13 games with 11 carries for 41 yards and three catches for 22 yards while also playing an important role on special teams and making 12 tackles. The Dawgs concluded the 2007 season with a New Years Day Sugar Bowl Victory over the University of Hawaiʻi at Mānoa.

As a sophomore in 2008, Chapas appeared in all 13 games (6 starts) for the preseason #1 ranked team in the country, while also playing special teams. He caught nine passes for 120 yards, scored his first career touchdown and made 2 special teams tackles. He was named CoSIDA/ESPN The Magazine Academic All-District III First-team, earned SEC Academic Honor Roll, Director's Honor Roll distinction for the fall semester, and was named CBS Scholar Athlete of the game versus LSU.

As a junior in 2009, he appeared in 12 games (7 starts). He was tabbed by Sporting News as the "SEC's Best Blocking Back." In addition to his lead blocking, he had seven carries for 45 yards, one rushing touchdown, nine receptions for 50 yards, one receiving touchdownand 4 special teams tackles.

As a senior in 2010, Chapas was selected as the team's overall permanent captain. He appeared in 11 games (9 starts), posting 15 carries for 44 yards, 2 rushing touchdowns, 5 receptions for 29 yards, 2 receiving touchdowns and one special teams tackle. At the team's annual awards Gala, he earned the team's Coaches Leadership Award for Special Teams, the Leon Farmer Award for dedication to the strength and conditioning program and the David Jacobs Award as the player who by example portrays courage, spirit, character and determination. He missed the 2010 Liberty Bowl after having ankle surgery.

== Professional career ==
Pre-draft measurables
Height	Weight	Arm length	Hand span	Wingspan	40-yard dash	10-yard split	20-yard split	20-yard shuttle	Three-cone drill	Vertical jump	Broad jump	Bench press
6 ft 2 1/8 in (1.88 m)	247 lb (112 kg)	32 in (0.81 m)	9 1/2 in (0.24 m)	6 ft 4 3/8 in (1.94 m)	4.79 s	1.66 s	2.78 s	4.40 s	7.12 s	35.5 in (0.90 m)	9 ft 8 in (2.95 m)	23 reps
All values from NFL Combine/Pro Day

=== Dallas Cowboys ===
Chapas was selected by the Dallas Cowboys in the seventh round (220th overall) of the 2011 NFL draft. He was waived on September 3 and was signed to the practice squad on September 5.

On November 29, he was promoted to the active roster after an injury to fullback Tony Fiammetta, making his first professional start against the Arizona Cardinals. He was released on August 31, 2012.

=== Detroit Lions ===
On September 2, 2012, the Detroit Lions signed him to their practice squad. On December 14, he was promoted to the regular roster and appeared in the final five games of the season, playing in 3 games (one start).

On August 31, 2013, he was waived and re-signed the next day. He was released on October 16, to make room for wide receiver Patrick Edwards.

=== Jacksonville Jaguars ===
On November 26, 2013, he was signed to the Jacksonville Jaguars. He was released on May 12, 2014.

=== Baltimore Ravens ===
On May 19, 2014, Chapas signed as a free agent with the Baltimore Ravens. On August 25, he was waived with an injury settlement, after injuring both of his shoulders during training camp.
