= Raymond Radway =

American gridiron football player (born 1987)

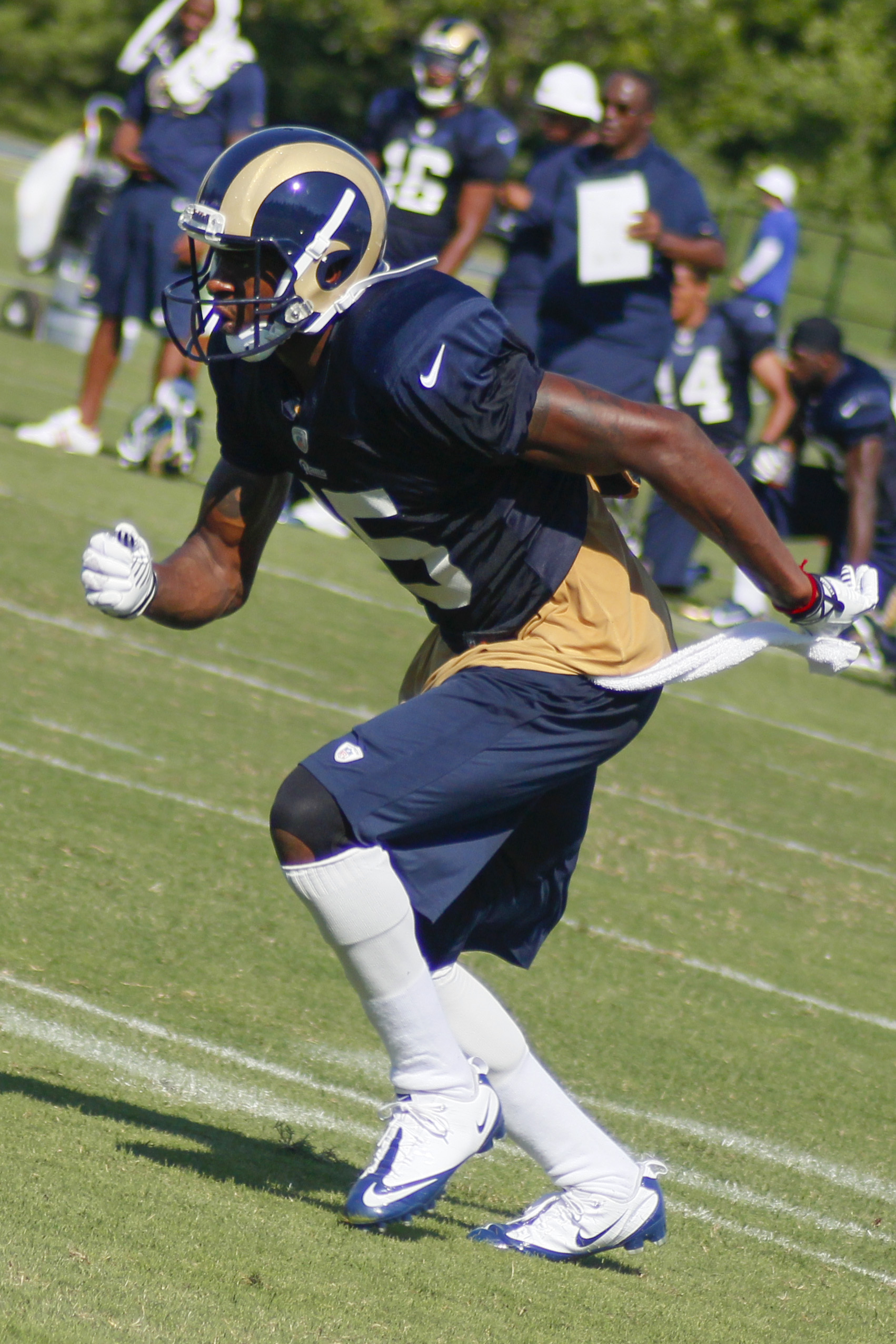
- Radway with the St. Louis Rams in 2013

No. 3
- Position: Wide receiver

Personal information
- Born: July 5, 1987 (age 39); McKinney, Texas, U.S.
- Listed height: 6 ft 3 in (1.91 m)
- Listed weight: 204 lb (93 kg)

Career information
- High school: McKinney (TX) North
- College: Cloud County CC (2006-2007); Abilene Christian (2008-2009)
- NFL draft: 2011: undrafted

Career history
- Dallas Cowboys (2011–2012); Chicago Bears (2012)*; St. Louis Rams (2012–2013)*; Los Angeles KISS (2014); Calgary Stampeders (2014)*
- * Offseason or practice squad member only

Career AFL statistics
- Receptions: 21
- Receiving yards: 274
- Receiving touchdowns: 3
- Stats at ArenaFan.com
- Stats at Pro Football Reference

Raymond Radway (born July 5, 1987) is an American former professional football wide receiver. He was a member of the Dallas Cowboys, Chicago Bears and St. Louis Rams of the National Football League, the Los Angeles KISS of the Arena Football League, and the Calgary Stampeders of the Canadian Football League. He played college football at Abilene Christian University.

== Early life ==
Radway attended McKinney North High School, where he practiced football and track. In 2006, he enrolled at Cloud County Community College in Concordia Kansas. There he was named an All-American in the 200 and 400 metres.

In 2008 Radway transferred to Abilene Christian University after his sophomore season on a track scholarship. In track, he was a four-time NCAA Division II All-American. That same year he won the NCAA Division II outdoor championship in the 400 metres.

As a junior in 2009, he was a backup wide receiver, making 8 receptions for 196 yards, before breaking his hand late in the season.

As a senior in 2010, he started all 12 games, ranking third on the team with 32 receptions for 438 yards and 5 touchdowns. He finished his college career with 40 receptions for 634 yards and 10 touchdowns.

== Professional career ==
Pre-draft measurables
Height	Weight	40-yard dash	10-yard split	20-yard split	20-yard shuttle	Three-cone drill	Vertical jump	Broad jump	Bench press	Wonderlic
6 ft 3 in (1.91 m)	193 lb (88 kg)	4.42 s	1.66 s	2.54 s	4.02 s	7.08 s	38 in (0.97 m)	10 ft 9 in (3.28 m)	6 reps	x
Values from Abilene Christian Pro Day

=== Dallas Cowboys ===
Radway was signed as an undrafted free agent by the Dallas Cowboys after the 2011 NFL draft on July 28, because he had an excellent size/speed ratio. He was a pleasant surprise during training camp and had his roster spot assured, until September 1, when in the last preseason contest against the Miami Dolphins, he suffered a broken left fibula and tibia after leaping for a catch during the last 3 seconds of the game. He was then placed on the injured reserve list on September 3.

The injury slowed his development and was eventually waived on August 27, 2012, after he was passed on the depth chart by younger wide receivers Cole Beasley and Andre Holmes. On October 8, he was signed to the team's practice squad, but was cut on October 23.

=== Chicago Bears ===
On October 30, 2012, Radway was signed by the Chicago Bears to the practice squad. He was released on November 27.

=== St. Louis Rams ===
On December 11, 2012, Radway was signed to the St. Louis Rams' practice squad. He was waived on August 26, 2013.

=== Los Angeles Kiss ===
On November 1, 2013, Radway was assigned to the Los Angeles KISS of the Arena Football League. He was placed on reassignment on July 8, 2014, after recording 20 receptions for the KISS.

=== Calgary Stampeders ===
On January 21, 2014, he was signed by the Calgary Stampeders of the Canadian Football League. He was cut on May 8.
