= Alex Albright =

American football player (born 1988)

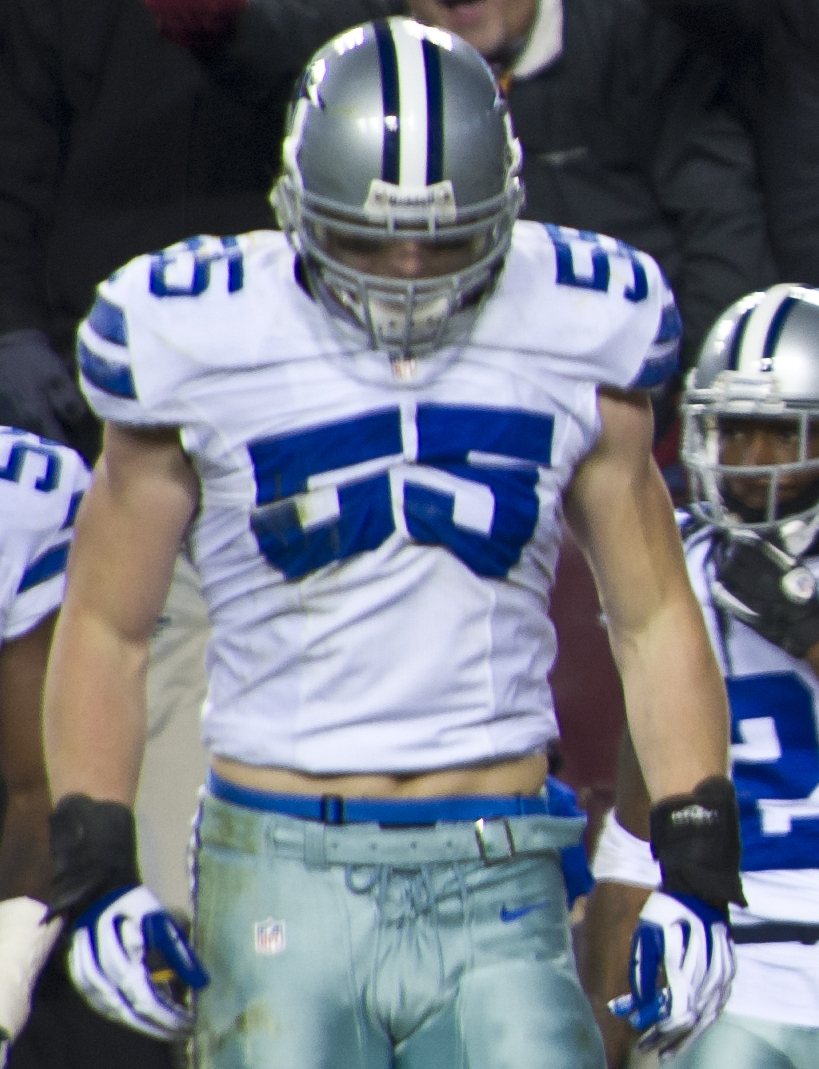
- Albright with the Dallas Cowboys in 2012

No. 47, 55
- Position: Linebacker

Personal information
- Born: January 29, 1988 (age 38); Cincinnati, Ohio, U.S.
- Listed height: 6 ft 5 in (1.96 m)
- Listed weight: 254 lb (115 kg)

Career information
- High school: St. Xavier (Cincinnati)
- College: Boston College
- NFL draft: 2011: undrafted

Career history
- Dallas Cowboys (2011–2013)

Career NFL statistics
- Games played: 30
- Total tackles: 42
- Stats at Pro Football Reference

Alex Albright (born January 29, 1988) is an American former professional football player who was a linebacker for the Dallas Cowboys of the National Football League (NFL). He played college football for the Boston College Eagles.

== Early life ==
Albright is a 2006 graduate of St. Xavier High School in Cincinnati. He played defensive end in football and as a senior he registered 83 tackles with 12 sacks, while helping his team win the 2005 Division I state title. At the end of the season, he was named All-State, All-Southwest Ohio first-team, received the Greater Catholic League South Player of the Year award and played in the Ohio North-South Classic. He also was a starter on the school's basketball team that advanced to the 2005 Division I state championship game.

== College career ==
He accepted a football scholarship from Boston College and played in all 13 games as a true freshman defensive end. In his sophomore season, he missed the final two games after breaking his left forearm, but still received All-Atlantic Coast Conference (ACC) honorable mention, finishing with 38 tackles, a team-leading 8.5 sacks and 10 tackles-for-losses. The next year, he played in only two games after suffering a neck injury and being redshirted.

As a redshirt junior he started in seven games and recorded 32 tackles, with eight for losses. As a fifth-year senior he was named team captain, but played in only eight games after breaking his leg, finishing the year with 30 tackles, nine tackles-for-losses, 3.5 sacks and an interception.

== Professional career ==
Albright wasn't selected in the 2011 NFL draft because of his injury history and was signed as an undrafted free agent by the Dallas Cowboys. As a rookie, he was converted to outside linebacker, where he was a backup in all 16 games, finishing third on the team with 14 special teams tackles.

In the 2012 preseason, injuries forced the team to play him at tight end for a few days, so that the offense could get its normal practice reps. During the regular season, he showed his versatility backing up all four linebacker positions and starting two games at inside linebacker after Ernie Sims got hurt. He finished the season third on the team with 17 special teams tackles.

In 2013, Albright suffered a career ending back injury while playing a preseason game against the Arizona Cardinals. On August 19 he was waived injured, before being placed on injured reserve the next day. He was released from the team on September 10.
