= David Arkin (American football) =

American football player (born 1987)

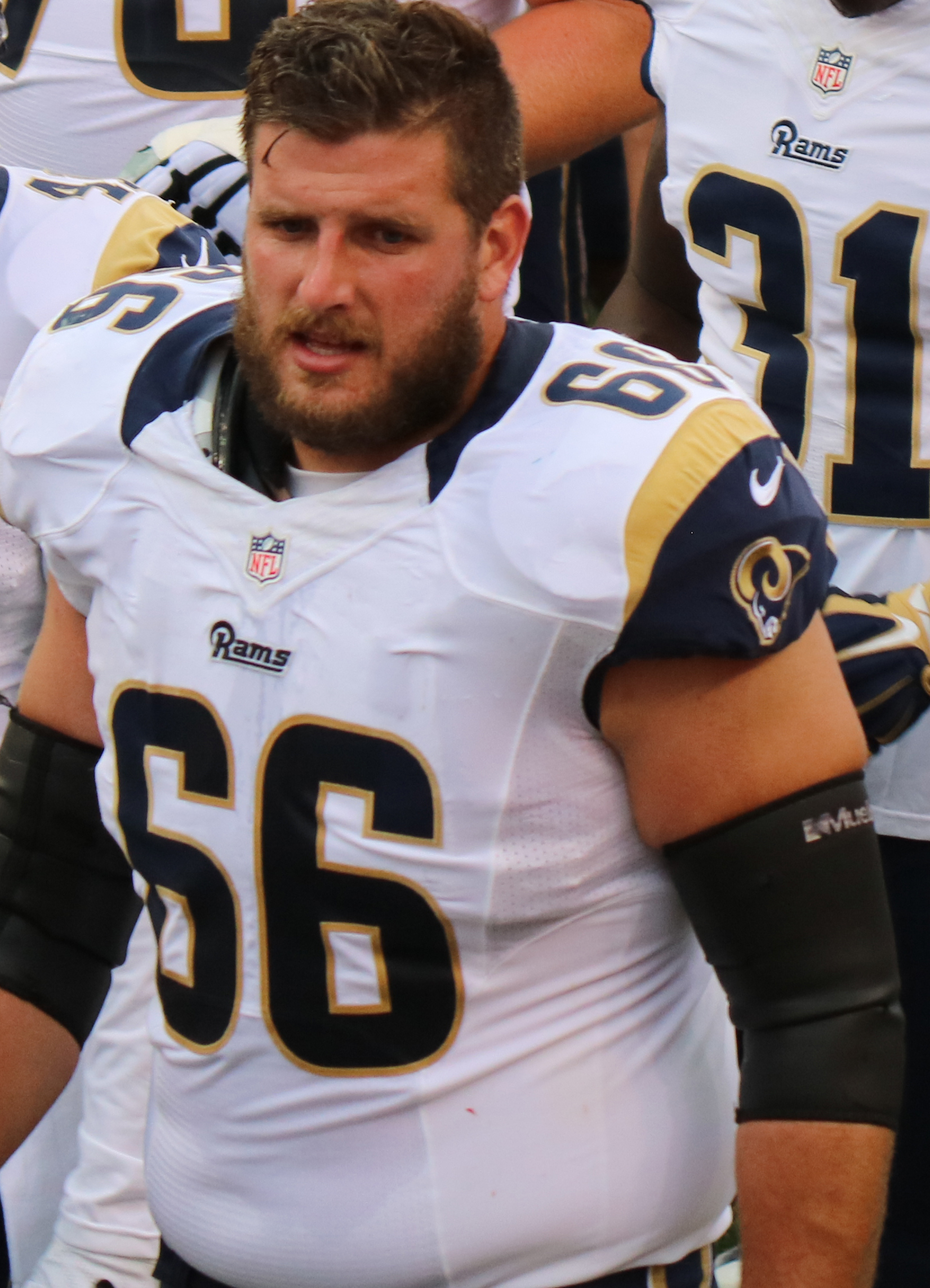
- Arkin with the Los Angeles Rams in 2016

No. 66, 65
- Position: Offensive guard

Personal information
- Born: October 7, 1987 (age 39); Wichita, Kansas, U.S.
- Listed height: 6 ft 5 in (1.96 m)
- Listed weight: 307 lb (139 kg)

Career information
- High school: Kapaun Mt. Carmel Catholic (Wichita)
- College: Missouri State (2006–2010)
- NFL draft: 2011: 4th round, 110th overall pick

Career history
- Dallas Cowboys (2011–2013); Miami Dolphins (2013); Seattle Seahawks (2014)*; Indianapolis Colts (2014–2015); St. Louis / Los Angeles Rams (2015–2016)
- * Offseason or practice squad member only

Awards and highlights
- 2× All-MVFC (2009, 2010); 2× Second-team All-MVFC (2007, 2008)

Career NFL statistics
- Games played: 3
- Stats at Pro Football Reference

David John Arkin (born October 7, 1987) is an American former professional football player who was an offensive guard in the National Football League (NFL). He played college football for the Missouri State Bears. He was a member of the Dallas Cowboys, Miami Dolphins, Seattle Seahawks, Indianapolis Colts and Los Angeles Rams.

== Early life ==
Arkin attended Kapaun Mt. Carmel High School. He became a starter as a sophomore. As a senior, he was a consensus All-state selection as an offensive lineman. As a defensive lineman, he earned All-city consideration, registering 47 tackles and 3 sacks, while helping his team to a sectional championship. He started 28 games in his last three seasons. He also was part of the school's wrestling team.

He accepted a football scholarship from Missouri State University. He was the team starter at right guard in his first three years. He started playing left tackle in the last two games of his junior season and was named the full-time starter at that position as a senior.

He received All-MVFC honors in four straight years, becoming the third Missouri State player ever to achieve that distinction.

== Professional career ==
Pre-draft measurables
| Height | Weight | Arm length | Hand span | Wingspan | 40-yard dash | 10-yard split | 20-yard split | 20-yard shuttle | Three-cone drill | Vertical jump | Broad jump | Bench press |
|---|---|---|---|---|---|---|---|---|---|---|---|---|
| 6 ft 4 3/4 in (1.95 m) | 300 lb (136 kg) | 33 7/8 in (0.86 m) | 10 1/2 in (0.27 m) | 6 ft 7 in (2.01 m) | 5.36 s | 1.89 s | 3.11 s | 4.63 s | 7.60 s | 29.0 in (0.74 m) | 8 ft 7 in (2.62 m) | 25 reps |
All values from NFL Combine

=== Dallas Cowboys ===
Arkin was selected by the Dallas Cowboys in the fourth round (110th overall) in the 2011 NFL draft, with the intention of playing him at offensive guard. He was declared inactive for every game as a rookie.

In 2012, he was forced to learn the center position in training camp, after the team suffered a series of injuries. His lack of strength and experience, kept him inactive in 9 games. He was active for 7 contests, although he didn't play a snap despite being healthy.

In 2013, the team decided to have him focus on the right guard position. As he has done in previous training camps, he proved to be one of the most durable players on the team and was activated for the first regular season game of his career in the season opener against the New York Giants. He was released on October 26, to make room for Jakar Hamilton and later signed to the team's practice squad.

=== Miami Dolphins ===
On November 5, 2013, he was signed by the Miami Dolphins from the Dallas Cowboys practice squad. The signing was a direct result of the issues the Dolphins where having on their offensive line, after Richie Incognito alleged role in the harassment of teammate Jonathan Martin. He was active in only one game (against the Carolina Panthers). The following season after being tried at center, he was waived on August 30, 2014.

=== Seattle Seahawks ===
On September 3, 2014, the Seattle Seahawks signed him to their practice squad. He was waived five days later.

=== Indianapolis Colts ===
On September 16, 2014, Arkin was signed to the Indianapolis Colts practice squad. On December 31, he was promoted to the active roster when Gosder Cherilus was placed on the injured reserve list. He played in 3 playoff games, mainly on special teams.

On September 5, 2015, he was released and signed to the practice squad. He was cut from the practice squad on September 23, and re-signed on October 26. On November 3, he was released to make room for guard Ben Heenan.

=== St. Louis / Los Angeles Rams ===
On November 17, 2015, Arkin was signed to the St. Louis Rams practice squad. On September 6, 2016, he was released and signed to the Rams' practice squad two days later. He was promoted to the active roster on December 15. He appeared in 2 games as a backup offensive guard. He was released by the Rams on May 1, 2017.
