= Kyle Kosier =

American football player (born 1978)

No. 72, 69, 63
- Position: Guard

Personal information
- Born: November 27, 1978 (age 47); Phoenix, Arizona, U.S.
- Listed height: 6 ft 5 in (1.96 m)
- Listed weight: 305 lb (138 kg)

Career information
- High school: Cactus (Glendale, Arizona)
- College: Arizona State
- NFL draft: 2002: 7th round, 249th overall pick

Career history
- San Francisco 49ers (2002–2004); Detroit Lions (2005); Dallas Cowboys (2006–2011)

Career NFL statistics
- Games played: 143
- Games started: 120
- Fumble recoveries: 4
- Stats at Pro Football Reference

Kyle Kosier (/ˈkoʊʃər/; born November 27, 1978) is an American former professional football player who was a guard in 143 games in the National Football League (NFL). He played college football for the Arizona State Sun Devils and was selected by the San Francisco 49ers in the seventh round of the 2002 NFL draft. Kosier also played for the Detroit Lions and Dallas Cowboys.

== Early and personal life ==
Kosier is from Peoria, Arizona and attended Cactus High School in Glendale, Arizona, where he was a letterman in football, basketball, baseball, and track and graduated in 1997. In football, his athleticism allowed him to play middle linebacker at a bigger size than most players could. As a senior in 1996, he was named Class 4A All-State, the Arizona Republic named him to the All-Arizona Team, and KPNX-TV named him the 1996 Arizona Class 4A Defensive Player of the Year. He finished with 634 career tackles. He also had an extensive football career at the Peoria Unified School District.

In 2011, he became the first football player to have his jersey retired by Cactus High School.

Kosier is married to his high school sweetheart and they have two children together.

== College career ==
Kosier accepted a scholarship from Arizona State University to play defensive end, but a shortage of offensive linemen made him convert to offensive guard as a redshirt freshman.The next year, he started the last two games of the season at right guard.

He was a starter at right guard as a junior and at right tackle as a senior, receiving honorable-mention All-Pac-10 honors.

== Professional career ==
=== San Francisco 49ers ===
Kosier was selected by the San Francisco 49ers in seventh round (248th overall) of the 2002 NFL draft. He played mostly on special teams as a rookie. The next year, he became a starter at both left guard and right tackle.

In 2003, he started 7 games at left guard, 3 at right guard and 2 at right tackle. The next year, he started 16 games rotating between left tackle (10 games) and right guard (6 games).

=== Detroit Lions ===
On April 19, 2005, the Detroit Lions signed him as a restricted free agent to a one-year contract, reuniting with his former 49ers head coach Steve Mariucci. The 49ers did not match the offer and received a seventh-round draft choice (#223-Marcus Maxwell) from the Lions as compensation.

Kosier was initially used by the team as a swing tackle, until being named the starting left guard for the last 11 games.

=== Dallas Cowboys ===
On March 11, 2006, he was signed as an unrestricted free agent by the Dallas Cowboys to a five-year, $15 million contract. Although the move was made to replace Larry Allen at left guard, it didn't get much acknowledgment because Kosier was a relatively unknown player. He started 80 games over six seasons, missing 13 games in 2008 with a hairline fracture in his right foot and 3 with knee/ankle injuries in 2010.

During the 2011 season, he was moved to right guard to help with the development of rookie right tackle Tyron Smith, who became a Pro Bowl alternate. Kosier played that year with a plantar fascia injury, before suffering a torn medial collateral ligament in his left knee in the last game of the regular season.

Throughout his Cowboys years, he always remained an important presence in the locker room, often getting recognition for the versatility, chemistry, and stability he provided to the offensive line. On March 19, 2012, he was released after becoming expendable with the signings of free agent offensive guards Mackenzy Bernadeau and Nate Livings. In his NFL career, he played in 143 games.
