= Bill Nagy (American football) =

American football player (born 1987)

No. 61
- Positions: Center, guard

Personal information
- Born: October 26, 1987 (age 39); Orem, Utah, U.S.
- Listed height: 6 ft 3 in (1.91 m)
- Listed weight: 308 lb (140 kg)

Career information
- High school: Hudson (Hudson, Ohio)
- College: Wisconsin
- NFL draft: 2011: 7th round, 252nd overall pick

Career history
- Dallas Cowboys (2011); Detroit Lions (2012)

Career NFL statistics
- Games played: 4
- Games started: 4
- Stats at Pro Football Reference

Bill Nagy (born October 26, 1987) is an American former professional football player who was a center and guard for the Dallas Cowboys of the National Football League (NFL). He played college football for the Wisconsin Badgers. He was also a member of the Detroit Lions of the NFL.

== Early life ==
Nagy attended Hudson High School, where he was a three-time all-conference and a two-time all-state selection at guard in football. He also earned two letters in baseball and one in basketball.

He started only three games at right guard during his first three years at the University of Wisconsin–Madison. In 2009, he only played in three games after suffering an off the field injury in a moped accident. As a senior, he started eight of Wisconsin's thirteen games at three different positions (guard, center and tight end).

== Professional career ==
Pre-draft measurables
Height	Weight	40-yard dash	10-yard split	20-yard split	20-yard shuttle	Three-cone drill	Vertical jump	Broad jump	Bench press
6 ft 2 7/8 in (1.90 m)	302 lb (137 kg)	5.05 s	1.75 s	2.91 s	4.47 s	7.36 s	30.5 in (0.77 m)	9 ft 2 in (2.79 m)	26 reps
All values from Pro Day

=== Dallas Cowboys ===
Nagy was selected in the seventh round (252nd overall) of the 2011 NFL draft by the Dallas Cowboys. After starting four games at left guard in his rookie season, he suffered a fractured ankle while playing against the New England Patriots and was placed on the injured reserve list on October 18.

During the first week of training camp in 2012, he suffered a severe sprain on the same ankle he had fractured the previous season. On August 14, he was waived/injured with the intention of placing him on the injured reserve list.

=== Detroit Lions ===
On August 16, 2012, the Detroit Lions claimed him off waivers, knowing he would have to spend the remainder of the season on the injured reserve list. On July 24, 2013, he was released after not being able to recover from his ankle injury.

== Personal life ==
Nagy served as a strength and conditioning graduate assistant at the University of Pittsburgh. In 2015, he joined the University of Wisconsin football coaching staff.
