= 2012 Dallas Cowboys season =

53rd season in franchise history

- Owner: Jerry Jones
- General manager: Jerry Jones
- Head coach: Jason Garrett
- Home stadium: Cowboys Stadium

Results
- Record: 8–8
- Division place: 3rd NFC East
- Playoffs: Did not qualify
- All-Pros: LB DeMarcus Ware (2nd team); TE Jason Witten (2nd team)
- Pro Bowlers: LB Anthony Spencer; LB DeMarcus Ware; TE Jason Witten

Uniform
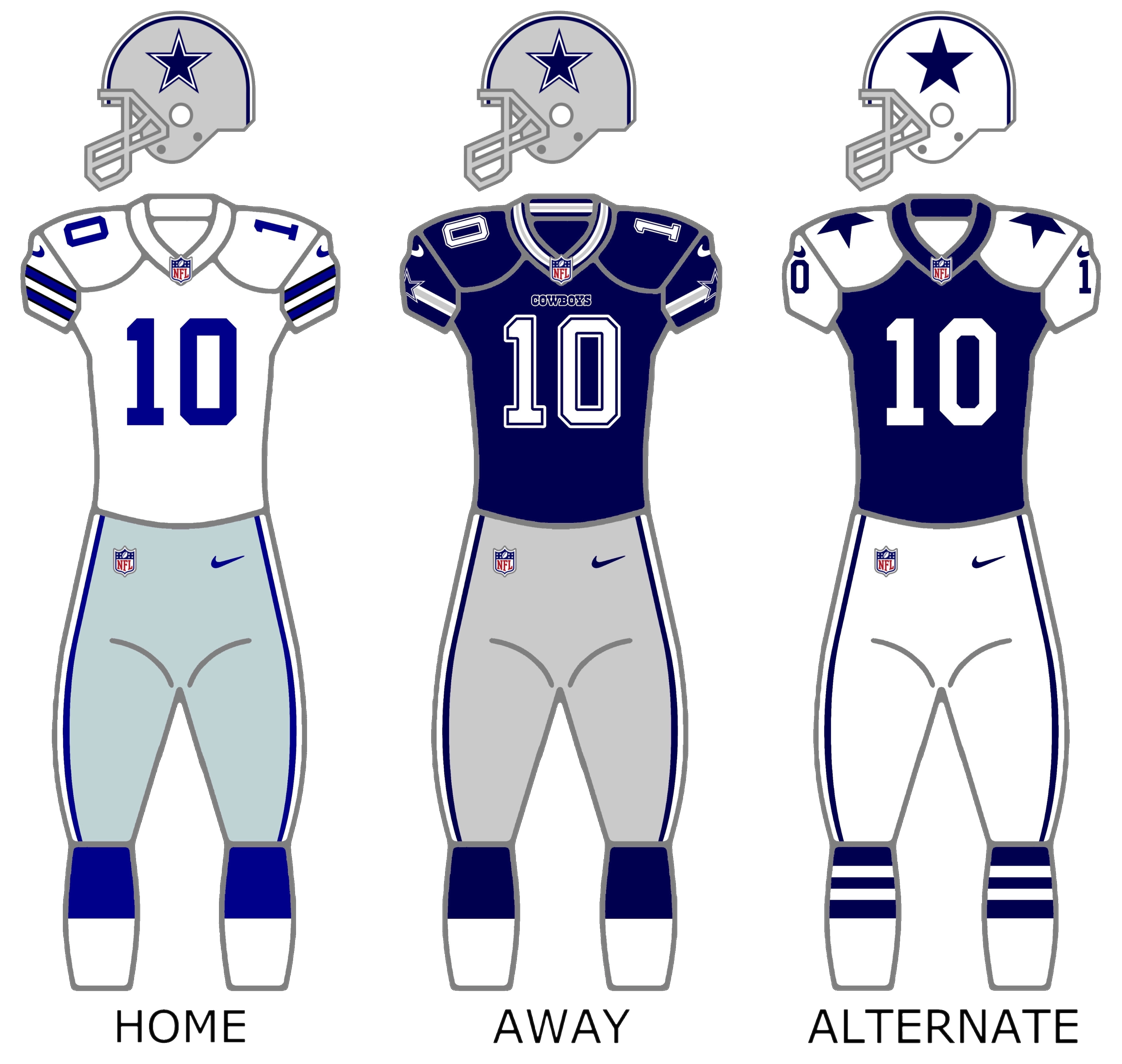

The 2012 season was the Dallas Cowboys' 53rd in the National Football League (NFL), their fourth playing home games at Cowboys Stadium and their second full season under head coach Jason Garrett. The Cowboys matched their win total from 2011, but missed the playoffs for a third consecutive season after losing their final game for the second straight season, this time to the Washington Redskins.

== 2012 draft class ==
2012 Dallas Cowboys draft
Round	Selection	Player	Position	College
1	6	Morris Claiborne	CB	LSU
3	81	Tyrone Crawford	DE	Boise State
4	113	Kyle Wilber	LB	Wake Forest
4	135	Matt Johnson	S	Eastern Washington
5	152	Danny Coale	WR	Virginia Tech
6	186	James Hanna	TE	Oklahoma
7	222	Caleb McSurdy	LB	Montana

Compensatory selection

Notes

- The Cowboys traded their original first and second-round selections to the St. Louis Rams in order to move up in the first-round and select Morris Claiborne.

== Staff ==
2012 Dallas Cowboys staff
Front office: Owner/president/general manager – Jerry Jones; COO/executive vice president/director of player personnel – Stephen Jones; Assistant director of player personnel – Tom Ciskowski; Director of football administration – Todd Williams; Assistant Director of pro scouting – Judd Garrett; Head coaches: Head coach – Jason Garrett; Assistant head coach/wide receivers – Jimmy Robinson; Offensive coaches: Offensive coordinator/offensive line – Bill Callahan; Quarterbacks – Wade Wilson; Running backs – Skip Peete; Tight ends – John Garrett; Assistant offensive line – Wes Phillips; Offensive quality control/wide receivers – Keith O'Quinn	Defensive coaches: Defensive coordinator – Rob Ryan; Defensive line – Brian Baker; Linebackers – Matt Eberflus; Secondary – Jerome Henderson; Assistant secondary – Joe Baker; Defensive assistant/defensive line – Leon Lett; Defensive quality control/linebackers – Ben Bloom; Defensive assistant- Dave Borgonzi; Special teams coaches: Special teams coordinator – Joe DeCamillis; Assistant special teams/kickers – Chris Boniol; Strength and conditioning: Strength and conditioning – Mike Woicik; Assistant strength and conditioning – Walt Williams; Assistant strength and conditioning – Brett Bech

== Rosters ==
=== Opening preseason roster ===
Dallas Cowboys 2012 opening preseason roster
Quarterbacks: 11 Rudy Carpenter; 7 Stephen McGee; 18 Kyle Orton; 9 Tony Romo; Running backs: 45 Shaun Chapas FB; 25 Lance Dunbar; 28 Felix Jones; 29 DeMarco Murray; 49 Jamize Olawale RB/FB; 34 Phillip Tanner; 47 Lawrence Vickers FB; 35 Ed Wesley; Wide receivers: 19 Miles Austin; 14 Cole Beasley; 16 Tim Benford; 88 Dez Bryant; 13 Saalim Hakim; 17 Dwayne Harris; 15 Andre Holmes; 87 Donavon Kemp; 85 Kevin Ogletree; 86 Raymond Radway; Tight ends: 84 James Hanna; 83 John Nalbone; 89 John Phillips FB; 80 Andrew Szczerba; 82 Jason Witten	Offensive linemen: 75 Jeff Adams T; 64 Levy Adcock T; 62 David Arkin G; 67 Phil Costa C; 68 Doug Free T; 63 Harland Gunn G; 65 Ronald Leary G; 71 Nate Livings G; 74 Pat McQuistan T; 61 Bill Nagy G; 76 Tyrone Novikoff T/G; 78 Jermey Parnell T; 77 Tyron Smith T; Defensive linemen: 79 Ben Bass DE; 92 Josh Brent NT; 72 Rob Callaway NT; 99 Kenyon Coleman DE; 70 Tyrone Crawford DE; 98 Clifton Geathers DE; 97 Jason Hatcher DE; 95 Sean Lissemore DE/NT; 90 Jay Ratliff NT; 96 Marcus Spears DE	Linebackers: 55 Alex Albright OLB/ILB; 59 Baraka Atkins OLB/DE; 57 Victor Butler OLB/DE; 54 Bruce Carter ILB; 52 Dan Connor ILB; 48 Isaiah Greenhouse ILB/FB; 53 Adrian Hamilton OLB/DE; 50 Sean Lee ILB; 58 Orie Lemon ILB; 56 Caleb McSurdy ILB; 93 Anthony Spencer OLB/DE; 94 DeMarcus Ware OLB/DE; 46 Aston Whiteside ILB/OLB; 51 Kyle Wilber OLB; Defensive backs: 31 Mario Butler CB; 39 Brandon Carr CB; 42 Barry Church SS; 24 Morris Claiborne CB; 37 Matt Johnson SS/FS; 30 Isaac Madison CB; 40 Danny McCray FS; 26 Akwasi Owusu-Ansah CB/FS; 23 Brodney Pool SS; 32 Orlando Scandrick CB; 43 Gerald Sensabaugh FS; 36 Mana Silva SS; 41 Lionel Smith CB; 33 Justin Taplin-Ross FS/CB; 38 Eddie Whitley FS; 20 Teddy Williams CB/WR; 27 C. J. Wilson CB; Special teams: 4 Delbert Alvarado P; 5 Dan Bailey K; 44 Charley Hughlett LS; 6 Chris Jones P; 91 L. P. Ladouceur LS	Reserve lists: 73 Mackenzy Bernadeau G/C (Active/PUP); 81 Danny Coale WR (Active/PUP); 21 Mike Jenkins CB (Active/PUP); 60 Kevin Kowalski C/G (Active/PUP); 90 active, 0 inactive

=== Week one roster ===
Dallas Cowboys 2012 week one roster
Quarterbacks: 18 Kyle Orton; 9 Tony Romo; Running backs: 28 Felix Jones; 29 DeMarco Murray; 34 Phillip Tanner; 47 Lawrence Vickers FB; Wide receivers: 19 Miles Austin; 11 Cole Beasley; 88 Dez Bryant; 17 Dwayne Harris; 15 Andre Holmes; 85 Kevin Ogletree; Tight ends: 87 Colin Cochart; 84 James Hanna; 89 Jeremy Phillips FB; 82 Jason Witten	Offensive linemen: 62 David Arkin G; 73 Mackenzy Bernadeau G/C; 63 Ryan Cook C; 67 Phil Costa C; 76 Derrick Dockery G; 68 Doug Free T; 71 Nate Livings G; 78 Martin Parnell T; 77 Tyron Smith T; Defensive linemen: 92 Josh Brent NT; 99 Kenyon Coleman DE; 70 Tyrone Crawford DE; 97 Jason Hatcher DE; 95 Sean Lissemore DE/NT; 90 Jay Ratliff NT; 96 Marcus Spears DE	Linebackers: 55 Alex Albright OLB/ILB; 57 Victor Butler OLB/DE; 54 Bruce Carter ILB; 52 Dan Connor ILB; 50 Sean Lee ILB; 93 Anthony Spencer OLB/DE; 94 DeMarcus Ware OLB/DE; 51 Kyle Wilber OLB; Defensive backs: 31 Mario Butler CB; 39 Brandon Carr CB; 42 Barry Church SS; 24 Morris Claiborne CB; 21 Mike Jenkins CB; 37 Matt Johnson SS/FS; 40 Danny McCray FS; 32 Orlando Scandrick CB; 43 Gerald Sensabaugh FS; 36 Mana Silva SS; Special teams: 5 Dan Bailey K; 6 Chris Jones P; 91 L. P. Ladouceur LS	Reserve lists: -- Donavon Kemp WR (IR); 60 Kevin Kowalski C/G (PUP); 56 Caleb McSurdy ILB (IR); Practice Squad: 79 Ben Bass DE; 16 Tim Benford WR; 72 Rob Callaway NT; 81 Danny Coale WR; 25 Lance Dunbar RB; 65 Ronald Leary G; 58 Orie Lemon ILB; 49 Jamize Olawale RB/FB; 53 Active, 3 Inactive, 8 PS

=== Final roster ===
Dallas Cowboys 2012 final roster
Quarterbacks: 18 Kyle Orton; 9 Tony Romo; Running backs: 25 Lance Dunbar; 28 Felix Jones; 29 DeMarco Murray; 34 Phillip Tanner; 47 Lawrence Vickers FB; Wide receivers: 19 Miles Austin; 11 Cole Beasley; 88 Dez Bryant; 17 Dwayne Harris; 85 Kevin Ogletree; Tight ends: 84 James Hanna; 89 John Phillips; 82 Jason Witten	Offensive linemen: 62 David Arkin G; 73 Mackenzy Bernadeau G; 63 Ryan Cook C; 76 Derrick Dockery G; 68 Doug Free T; 60 Kevin Kowalski C; 65 Ronald Leary G; 71 Nate Livings G; 78 Jermey Parnell T; 77 Tyron Smith T; 75 Darrion Weems T; Defensive linemen: 72 Rob Callaway NT; 70 Tyrone Crawford DE; 97 Jason Hatcher DE; 95 Sean Lissemore NT; 90 Jay Ratliff NT; 66 Brian Schaefering DE; 96 Marcus Spears DE	Linebackers: 55 Alex Albright OLB; 57 Victor Butler OLB; 52 Dan Connor ILB; 98 Brady Poppinga ILB; 59 Ernie Sims ILB; 93 Anthony Spencer OLB; 94 DeMarcus Ware OLB; 51 Kyle Wilber OLB; Defensive backs: 39 Brandon Carr CB; 24 Morris Claiborne CB; 20 Michael Coe CB; 27 Eric Frampton SS; 21 Mike Jenkins CB; 40 Danny McCray SS; 30 Sterling Moore CB; 26 Charlie Peprah SS; 43 Gerald Sensabaugh FS; Special teams: 5 Dan Bailey K; 91 L. P. Ladouceur LS; 2 Brian Moorman P	Reserve lists: 79 Ben Bass DE (IR); 92 Josh Brent NT (NF-Ill.); 54 Bruce Carter ILB (IR); 42 Barry Church SS (IR); 99 Kenyon Coleman DE (IR); 67 Phil Costa C (IR); 37 Matt Johnson FS (IR-DFR); 6 Chris Jones P (IR); -- Donavon Kemp WR (IR); 50 Sean Lee ILB (IR); 58 Orie Lemon ILB (IR); 56 Caleb McSurdy ILB (IR); 32 Orlando Scandrick CB (IR); Practice Squad: 23 Vince Agnew CB; 16 Tim Benford WR; 81 Danny Coale WR (IR); 15 Andre Holmes WR; 64 Ikponmwosa Igbinosun DE; 31 Micah Pellerin CB; 48 Brashton Satele LB; 87 Andre Smith TE; 61 Monte Taylor LB; 53 Active, 14 Inactive, 8 Practice Squad

== Schedule ==
=== Preseason ===
Week	Date	Opponent	Result	Record	Game site	NFL.com recap
1	August 13	at Oakland Raiders	**W** 3–0	1–0	O.co Coliseum	Recap
2	August 18	at San Diego Chargers	**L** 20–28	1–1	Qualcomm Stadium	Recap
3	August 25	St. Louis Rams	**W** 20–19	2–1	Cowboys Stadium	Recap
4	August 29	Miami Dolphins	**W** 30–13	3–1	Cowboys Stadium	Recap

=== Regular season ===
Week	Date	Opponent	Result	Record	Game site	NFL.com recap
1	September 5	at **New York Giants**	**W** 24–17	1–0	MetLife Stadium	Recap
2	September 16	at Seattle Seahawks	**L** 7–27	1–1	CenturyLink Field	Recap
3	September 23	Tampa Bay Buccaneers	**W** 16–10	2–1	Cowboys Stadium	Recap
4	October 1	Chicago Bears	**L** 18–34	2–2	Cowboys Stadium	Recap
5	Bye					
6	October 14	at Baltimore Ravens	**L** 29–31	2–3	M&T Bank Stadium	Recap
7	October 21	at Carolina Panthers	**W** 19–14	3–3	Bank of America Stadium	Recap
8	October 28	**New York Giants**	**L** 24–29	3–4	Cowboys Stadium	Recap
9	November 4	at Atlanta Falcons	**L** 13–19	3–5	Georgia Dome	Recap
10	November 11	at **Philadelphia Eagles**	**W** 38–23	4–5	Lincoln Financial Field	Recap
11	November 18	Cleveland Browns	**W** 23–20 (OT)	5–5	Cowboys Stadium	Recap
12	November 22	**Washington Redskins**	**L** 31–38	5–6	Cowboys Stadium	Recap
13	December 2	**Philadelphia Eagles**	**W** 38–33	6–6	Cowboys Stadium	Recap
14	December 9	at Cincinnati Bengals	**W** 20–19	7–6	Paul Brown Stadium	Recap
15	December 16	Pittsburgh Steelers	**W** 27–24 (OT)	8–6	Cowboys Stadium	Recap
16	December 23	New Orleans Saints	**L** 31–34 (OT)	8–7	Cowboys Stadium	Recap
17	December 30	at **Washington Redskins**	**L** 18–28	8–8	FedExField	Recap

Note: Intra-division opponents are in bold text.

=== Game summaries ===
==== Week 1: at New York Giants ====
Week One: Dallas Cowboys at New York Giants – Game summary

Quarter	1	2	3	4	Total
**Cowboys**	0	7	10	7	**24**
Giants	0	3	7	7	**17**

at MetLife Stadium, East Rutherford, New Jersey

- Date: September 5
- Game time: 8:20 p.m. EDT/7:20 p.m. CDT
- Game weather: 77 °F (25 °C), fair
- Game attendance: 82,287
- Referee: Jim Core
- TV announcers (NBC): Al Michaels, Cris Collinsworth and Michele Tafoya

Game information

**First quarter**

- No scoring plays

**Second quarter**

- NYG - Lawrence Tynes 22-yard field goal, 9:10. Giants 3-0. **Drive: 4 plays, -3 yards, 1:20.**
- DAL - Kevin Ogletree 10-yard pass from Tony Romo (Dan Bailey kick), 1:01. Cowboys 7-3. **Drive: 7 plays, 73 yards, 2:33.**

**Third quarter**

- DAL - Kevin Ogletree 40-yard pass from Tony Romo (Dan Bailey kick), 10:24. Cowboys 14-3. **Drive: 9 plays, 80 yards, 4:36.**
- NYG - Ahmad Bradshaw 10-yard run (Lawrence Tynes kick), 5:11. Cowboys 14-10. **Drive: 9 plays, 89 yards, 5:13.**
- DAL - Dan Bailey 33-yard field goal, 0:40. Cowboys 17-10. **Drive: 8 plays, 65 yards, 4:31.**

**Fourth quarter**

- DAL - Miles Austin 34-yard pass from Tony Romo (Dan Bailey kick), 5:57. Cowboys 24-10. **Drive: 8 plays, 82 yards, 7:06.**
- NYG - Martellus Bennett 9-yard pass from Eli Manning (Lawrence Tynes kick), 2:36. Cowboys 24-17. **Drive: 12 plays, 79 yards, 3:21.**

**Top passers**

- DAL – Tony Romo - 22/29, 307 yards, 3 TD, INT
- NYG – Eli Manning - 21/32, 213 yards, TD

**Top rushers**

- DAL – DeMarco Murray - 20 carries, 131 yards
- NYG – Ahmad Bradshaw - 17 carries, 78 yards, TD

**Top receivers**

- DAL – Kevin Ogletree - 8 receptions, 114 yards, 2 TD
- NYG – Victor Cruz - 6 receptions, 58 yards

**Top tacklers**

- DAL – Sean Lee - 12 tackles, 10 solo
- NYG – Antrel Rolle - 9 tackles, 9 solo

The Cowboys opened its 2012 campaign at MetLife Stadium in the Annual Kickoff Game against their NFC East foe, the defending Super Bowl champion New York Giants. After a scoreless first quarter, the Giants picked up the season's first points as kicker Lawrence Tynes kicked a 22-yard field goal in the second quarter. Dallas would close out the half with quarterback Tony Romo finding wide receiver Kevin Ogletree on a 10-yard touchdown pass.

In the third quarter, the Cowboys added onto its lead. Romo hooked up with Ogletree again with a 40-yard touchdown pass. New York answered with a 10-yard run from running back Ahmad Bradshaw, yet Dallas responded in kind with a 33-yard field goal from kicker Dan Bailey. The Cowboys pulled away for good in the fourth quarter with Romo connecting with wide receiver Miles Austin on a 34-yard touchdown pass. The Giants closed out the game with quarterback Eli Manning completing a 9-yard touchdown pass to former Dallas tight end Martellus Bennett.

With the win, the Cowboys began the season at 1–0.

==== Week 2: at Seattle Seahawks ====
Week Two: Dallas Cowboys at Seattle Seahawks – Game summary

Quarter	1	2	3	4	Total
Cowboys	0	7	0	0	**7**
**Seahawks**	10	3	7	7	**27**

at CenturyLink Field, Seattle, Washington

- Date: September 16
- Game time: 3:05 p.m. CDT/1:05 p.m. PDT
- Game weather: 68 °F (20 °C), sunny
- Game attendance: 68,008
- Referee: Donovan Briggans
- TV announcers (Fox): Kenny Albert, Daryl Johnston and Tony Siragusa

Game information

**First quarter**

- SEA - Steven Hauschka 21-yard field goal, 11:43. Seahawks 3-0. **Drive: 7 plays, 26 yards, 3:10.**
- SEA - Jeron Johnson 3-yard blocked punt return (Steven Hauschka kick), 10:23. Seahawks 10-0.

**Second quarter**

- DAL - Miles Austin 22-yard pass from Tony Romo (Dan Bailey kick), 12:09. Seahawks 10-7. **Drive: 15 plays, 95 yards, 7:31.**
- SEA - Steven Hauschka 25-yard field goal, 1:57. Seahawks 13-7. **Drive: 11 plays, 52 yards, 7:05.**

**Third quarter**

- SEA - Anthony McCoy 22-yard pass from Russell Wilson (Steven Hauschka kick), 5:05. Seahawks 20-7. **Drive: 8 plays, 90 yards, 4:08.**

**Fourth quarter**

- SEA - Marshawn Lynch 3-yard run (Steven Hauschka kick), 7:57. Seahawks 27-7. **Drive: 12 plays, 88 yards, 7:38.**

**Top passers**

- DAL – Tony Romo - 23/40, 251 yards, TD, INT
- SEA – Russell Wilson - 15/20, 151 yards, TD

**Top rushers**

- DAL – DeMarco Murray - 12 carries, 44 yards
- SEA – Marshawn Lynch - 26 carries, 122 yards, TD

**Top receivers**

- DAL – Miles Austin - 5 receptions, 63 yards, TD
- SEA – Anthony McCoy - 5 receptions, 41 yards, TD

**Top tacklers**

- DAL – Sean Lee - 14 tackles, 4 solo
- SEA – Kam Chancellor - 9 tackles, 7 solo

With the huge loss, the Cowboys fell to 1–1.

==== Week 3: vs. Tampa Bay Buccaneers ====
Week Three: Tampa Bay Buccaneers at Dallas Cowboys – Game summary

Quarter	1	2	3	4	Total
Buccaneers	7	0	0	3	**10**
**Cowboys**	7	3	0	6	**16**

at Cowboys Stadium, Arlington, Texas

- Date: September 23
- Game time: 12:00 p.m. CDT
- Game weather: Played indoors (retractable roof closed)
- Game attendance: 81,984
- Referee: Robert Dalton
- TV announcers (Fox): Joe Buck, Troy Aikman and Pam Oliver

Game information

**First quarter**

- TB - Luke Stocker 1-yard pass from Josh Freeman (Connor Barth kick), 10:51. Buccaneers 7-0. **Drive: 6 plays, 29 yards, 3:20.**
- DAL - DeMarco Murray 11-yard run (Dan Bailey kick), 1:22. Tied 7-7. **Drive: 4 plays, 23 yards, 2:01.**

**Second quarter**

- DAL - Dan Bailey 32-yard field goal, 2:51. Cowboys 10-7. **Drive: 7 plays, 11 yards, 3:25.**

**Third quarter**

- No scoring plays.

**Fourth quarter**

- DAL - Dan Bailey 26-yard field goal, 11:10. Cowboys 13-7. **Drive: 9 plays, 72 yards, 5:26.**
- DAL - Dan Bailey 22-yard field goal, 2:43. Cowboys 16-7. **Drive: 4 plays, 2 yards, 2:01.**
- TB - Connor Barth 28-yard field goal, 0:40. Cowboys 16-10. **Drive: 11 plays, 72 yards, 2:03.**

**Top passers**

- TB – Josh Freeman - 10/28, 110 yards, TD, INT
- DAL – Tony Romo - 25/39, 283 yards, INT

**Top rushers**

- TB – Doug Martin - 19 carries, 53 yards
- DAL – DeMarco Murray - 18 carries, 38 yards, TD

**Top receivers**

- TB – Mike Williams - 2 receptions, 33 yards
- DAL – Miles Austin - 5 receptions, 107 yards

**Top tacklers**

- TB – Mason Foster - 8 tackles, 7 solo
- DAL – Sean Lee - 7 tackles, 5 solo; Anthony Spencer - 7 tackles, 5 solo

Hoping to rebound from their tough road loss to the Seattle Seahawks, the Cowboys returned to Arlington to host their home opener against the Tampa Bay Buccaneers, a team that they had blown out a year before. This game, however, was a close one throughout. In the first quarter, Cowboys quarterback Tony Romo tossed an interception to Aqib Talib, which set up for a 1-yard touchdown pass from Tampa Bay quarterback Josh Freeman to tight end Luke Stocker for Tampa Bay to take the first lead. Dallas would immediately respond after a Sean Lee interception set up Cowboys running back DeMarco Murray for an 11-yard touchdown run to tie the game. Shortly before the half, kicker Dan Bailey booted a 32-yard field goal for Dallas to take the lead, 10–7. After a scoreless third quarter, Dallas pulled away with Dan Bailey knocking in a pair of field goals, one from 26 yards and another from 22 yards to make the game 16–7. Tampa Bay attempted a furious rally to take the game back after a 28-yard field goal by Connor Barth, but Dallas would recover the following onside kick and effectively took a knee to end the game.

With the victory, Dallas improved their season to 2–1.

==== Week 4: vs. Chicago Bears ====
Week Four: Chicago Bears at Dallas Cowboys – Game summary

Quarter	1	2	3	4	Total
**Bears**	0	10	14	10	**34**
Cowboys	0	7	3	8	**18**

at Cowboys Stadium, Arlington, Texas

- Date: October 1
- Game time: 7:30 p.m. CDT
- Game weather: 80 °F (27 °C), sunny (retractable roof open)
- Game attendance: 90,080
- Referee: Walt Anderson
- TV announcers (ESPN): Mike Tirico, Jon Gruden and Lisa Salters

Game information

**First quarter**

- No scoring plays.

**Second quarter**

- CHI - Robbie Gould 43-yard field goal, 4:15. Bears 3-0. **Drive: 7 plays, 69 yards, 7:07.**
- CHI - Charles Tillman 25-yard interception return (Robbie Gould kick), 2:38. Bears 10-0.
- DAL - Miles Austin 10-yard pass from Tony Romo (Dan Bailey kick), 0:14. Bears 10-7. **Drive: 9 plays, 80 yards, 2:24.**

**Third quarter**

- CHI - Devin Hester 34-yard pass from Jay Cutler (Robbie Gould kick), 11:54. Bears 17-7. **Drive: 5 plays, 73 yards, 3:06.**
- CHI - Lance Briggs 74-yard interception return (Robbie Gould kick), 6:11. Bears 24-7.
- DAL - Dan Bailey 39-yard field goal, 2:11. Bears 24-10. **Drive: 10 plays, 58 yards, 4:00.**

**Fourth quarter**

- CHI - Robbie Gould 21-yard field goal, 11:24. Bears 27-10. **Drive: 11 plays, 77 yards, 5:47.**
- CHI - Brandon Marshall 31-yard pass from Jay Cutler (Robbie Gould kick), 6:28. Bears 34-10. **Drive: 6 plays, 67 yards, 2:02.**
- DAL - Jason Witten 5-yard pass from Kyle Orton (Dez Bryant pass from Kyle Orton), 0:34. Bears 34-18. **Drive: 11 plays, 89 yards, 2:29.**

**Top passers**

- CHI – Jay Cutler - 18/24, 275 yards, 2 TD
- DAL – Tony Romo - 31/43, 307 yards, TD, 5 INT

**Top rushers**

- CHI – Matt Forte - 13 carries, 52 yards
- DAL – DeMarco Murray - 11 carries, 24 yards

**Top receivers**

- CHI – Brandon Marshall - 7 receptions, 138 yards, TD
- DAL – Jason Witten - 13 receptions, 112 yards, TD

**Top tacklers**

- CHI – Chris Conte - 11 tackles, 8 solo
- DAL – Sean Lee - 14 tackles, 10 solo

With the loss, the Cowboys enter their bye week with 2–2. Dallas quarterback Tony Romo had a forgettable game, tossing 5 interceptions, including 2 that were run back for touchdowns.

==== Week 6: at Baltimore Ravens ====
Week Six: Dallas Cowboys at Baltimore Ravens – Game summary

Quarter	1	2	3	4	Total
Cowboys	7	3	10	9	**29**
**Ravens**	3	14	7	7	**31**

at M&T Bank Stadium, Baltimore, Maryland

- Date: October 14
- Game time: 1:00 p.m. EDT/12:00 p.m. CDT
- Game weather: 69 °F (21 °C), partly cloudy
- Game attendance: 71,384
- Referee: Mike Carey
- TV announcers (Fox): Thom Brennaman, Brian Billick and Laura Okmin

Game information

**First quarter**

- BAL - Justin Tucker 38-yard field goal, 7:50. Ravens 3-0. **Drive: 14 plays, 60 yards, 7:10.**
- DAL - Felix Jones 22-yard run (Dan Bailey kick), 3:18. Cowboys 7-3. **Drive: 8 plays, 80 yards, 4:32.**

**Second quarter**

- DAL - Dan Bailey 42-yard field goal, 11:29. Cowboys 10-3. **Drive: 12 plays, 56 yards, 6:02.**
- BAL - Ray Rice 1-yard run (Justin Tucker kick), 7:29. Tied 10-10. **Drive: 8 plays, 80 yards, 4:00.**
- BAL - Torrey Smith 19-yard pass from Joe Flacco (Justin Tucker kick), 0:41. Ravens 17-10. **Drive: 8 plays, 80 yards, 1:34.**

**Third quarter**

- DAL - Dan Bailey 43-yard field goal, 11:37. Ravens 17-13. **Drive: 7 plays, 55 yards, 3:23.**
- BAL - Jacoby Jones 108-yard kickoff return (Justin Tucker kick), 11:24. Ravens 24-13. **Drive: 0 plays, 0 yards, 0:13.**
- DAL - Dez Bryant 7-yard pass from Tony Romo (Dan Bailey kick), 3:19. Ravens 24-20. **Drive: 14 plays, 80 yards, 8:05.**

**Fourth quarter**

- DAL - Dan Bailey 34-yard field goal, 8:22. Ravens 24-23. **Drive: 8 plays, 21 yards, 5:07.**
- BAL - Ray Rice 1-yard run (Justin Tucker kick), 4:41. Ravens 31-23. **Drive: 10 plays, 73 yards, 3:41.**
- DAL - Dez Bryant 4-yard pass from Tony Romo (pass failed), 0:32. Ravens 31-29. **Drive: 18 plays, 80 yards, 4:09.**

**Top passers**

- DAL – Tony Romo - 25/36, 261 yards, 2 TD, INT
- BAL – Joe Flacco - 17/26, 234 yards, TD

**Top rushers**

- DAL – DeMarco Murray - 14 carries, 93 yards
- BAL – Ray Rice - 16 carries, 63 yards, 2 TD

**Top receivers**

- DAL – Dez Bryant - 13 receptions, 95 yards, 2 TD
- BAL – Anquan Boldin - 5 receptions, 98 yards

**Top tacklers**

- DAL – Danny McCray - 7 tackles, 6 solo
- BAL – Ray Lewis - 14 tackles, 8 solo

With the loss, the Cowboys fell into 2–3 and dropped to 0–4 all-time against the Ravens. Horrible clock management by head coach Jason Garrett on the final drive left Dallas' kicker with a 50+ yard field goal attempt that he pushed wide as time expired.

==== Week 7: at Carolina Panthers ====
Week Seven: Dallas Cowboys at Carolina Panthers – Game summary

Quarter	1	2	3	4	Total
**Cowboys**	0	3	10	6	**19**
Panthers	0	7	0	7	**14**

at Bank of America Stadium, Charlotte, North Carolina

- Date: October 21
- Game time: 1:00 p.m. EDT/12:00 p.m. CDT
- Game weather: 62 °F (17 °C), sunny
- Game attendance: 73,981
- Referee: Ron Winter
- TV announcers (Fox): Kenny Albert, Daryl Johnston and Tony Siragusa

Game information

**First quarter**

- No scoring plays.

**Second quarter**

- DAL - Dan Bailey 19-yard field goal, 14:16. Cowboys 3-0. **Drive: 18 plays, 91 yards, 10:10.**
- CAR - Brandon LaFell 5-yard pass from Cam Newton (Justin Medlock kick), 0:14. Panthers 7-3. **Drive: 10 plays, 80 yards, 4:00.**

**Third quarter**

- DAL - Miles Austin 26-yard pass from Tony Romo (Dan Bailey kick), 7:38. Cowboys 10-7. **Drive: 4 plays, 63 yards, 1:54.**
- DAL - Dan Bailey 49-yard field goal, 2:13. Cowboys 13-7. **Drive: 6 plays, 9 yards, 3:27.**

**Fourth quarter**

- CAR - Mike Tolbert 2-yard run (Justin Medlock kick), 11:38. Panthers 14-13. **Drive: 9 plays, 75 yards, 2:20.**
- DAL - Dan Bailey 28-yard field goal, 3:25. Cowboys 16-14. **Drive: 10 plays, 44 yards, 4:07.**
- DAL - Dan Bailey 38-yard field goal, 0:53. Cowboys 19-14. **Drive: 6 plays, 19 yards, 1:15.**

**Top passers**

- DAL – Tony Romo - 24/34, 227 yards, TD
- CAR – Cam Newton - 21/37, 233 yards, TD, INT

**Top rushers**

- DAL – Felix Jones - 15 carries, 44 yards
- CAR – Cam Newton - 6 carries, 64 yards

**Top receivers**

- DAL – Miles Austin - 5 receptions, 97 yards, TD
- CAR – Steve Smith Sr. - 7 receptions, 83 yards

**Top tacklers**

- DAL – DeMarcus Ware - 8 tackles, 3 solo
- CAR – Luke Kuechly - 15 tackles, 8 solo

The Cowboys beat the Panthers to improve to a .500 record.

==== Week 8: vs. New York Giants ====
Week Eight: New York Giants at Dallas Cowboys – Game summary

Quarter	1	2	3	4	Total
**Giants**	13	10	0	6	**29**
Cowboys	0	10	14	0	**24**

at Cowboys Stadium, Arlington, Texas

- Date: October 28
- Game time: 3:25 p.m. CDT
- Game weather: 62 °F (17 °C), sunny skies (retractable roof open)
- Game attendance: 94,067
- Referee: Scott Green
- TV announcers (Fox): Thom Brennaman, Troy Aikman and Pam Oliver

Game information

**First quarter**

- NYG - Lawrence Tynes 41-yard field goal, 11:53. Giants 3-0. **Drive: 7 plays, 57 yards, 3:07.**
- NYG - Lawrence Tynes 37-yard field goal, 7:11. Giants 6-0. **Drive: 4 plays, 8 yards, 2:00.**
- NYG - Andre Brown 1-yard run (Lawrence Tynes kick), 3:41. Giants 13-0. **Drive: 4 plays, 31 yards, 2:01.**

**Second quarter**

- NYG - Lawrence Tynes 26-yard field goal, 14:22. Giants 16-0. **Drive: 4 plays, 7 yards, 1:21.**
- NYG - Jason Pierre-Paul 28-yard interception return (Lawrence Tynes kick), 13:05. Giants 23-0.
- DAL - Felix Jones 4-yard run (Dan Bailey kick), 5:22. Giants 23-7. **Drive: 8 plays, 72 yards, 3:07.**
- DAL - Dan Bailey 51-yard field goal, 0:58. Giants 23-10. **Drive: 6 plays, 55 yards, 1:39.**

**Third quarter**

- DAL - Tony Romo 1-yard run (Dan Bailey kick), 9:16. Giants 23-17. **Drive: 11 plays, 86 yards, 5:44.**
- DAL - John Phillips 1-yard pass from Tony Romo (Dan Bailey kick), 3:43. Cowboys 24-23. **Drive: 8 plays, 59 yards, 4:24.**

**Fourth quarter**

- NYG - Lawrence Tynes 43-yard field goal, 10:20. Giants 26-24. **Drive: 8 plays, 60 yards, 4:26.**
- NYG - Lawrence Tynes 37-yard field goal, 3:31. Giants 29-24. **Drive: 6 plays, 26 yards, 3:09.**

**Top passers**

- NYG – Eli Manning - 15/29, 192 yards, INT
- DAL – Tony Romo - 36/62, 437 yards, TD, 4 INT

**Top rushers**

- NYG – Ahmad Bradshaw - 22 carries, 78 yards
- DAL – Felix Jones - 13 carries, 19 yards, TD

**Top receivers**

- NYG – Rueben Randle - 2 receptions, 68 yards
- DAL – Jason Witten - 18 receptions, 167 yards

**Top tacklers**

- NYG – Stevie Brown - 8 tackles, 8 solo
- DAL – Brandon Carr - 5 tackles, 5 solo; Morris Claiborne - 5 tackles, 3 solo; Kenyon Coleman - 5 tackles, 3 solo; Jay Ratliff - 5 tackles, 3 solo; Anthony Spencer - 5 tackles, 2 solo

With the loss, the Cowboys fell to 3–4 on the season and 0–4 at Cowboys Stadium against the Giants. A late go-ahead touchdown catch by Dez Bryant was overturned on review as it showed that as Bryant's hand came down to brace his landing, barely a tip of one finger came down on the end line, thus ruling him out of bounds.

==== Week 9: at Atlanta Falcons ====
Week Nine: Dallas Cowboys at Atlanta Falcons – Game summary

Quarter	1	2	3	4	Total
Cowboys	6	0	0	7	**13**
**Falcons**	0	6	0	13	**19**

at Georgia Dome, Atlanta

- Date: November 4
- Game time: 8:20 p.m. EST/7:20 p.m. CST
- Game weather: Played indoors (dome stadium)
- Game attendance: 70,840
- Referee: John Parry
- TV announcers (NBC): Al Michaels, Cris Collinsworth and Michele Tafoya

Game information

**First quarter**

- DAL - Dan Bailey 23-yard field goal, 10:46. Cowboys 3-0. **Drive: 7 plays, 27 yards, 3:07.**
- DAL - Dan Bailey 32-yard field goal, 3:42. Cowboys 6-0. **Drive: 7 plays, 59 yards, 2:33.**

**Second quarter**

- ATL - Matt Bryant 45-yard field goal, 14:15. Cowboys 6-3. **Drive: 8 plays, 46 yards, 4:27.**
- ATL - Matt Bryant 46-yard field goal, 0:00. Tied 6-6. **Drive: 7 plays, 60 yards, 1:03.**

**Third quarter**

- No scoring plays.

**Fourth quarter**

- ATL - Michael Turner 3-yard run (Matt Bryant kick), 14:16. Falcons 13-6. **Drive: 6 plays, 81 yards, 3:23.**
- ATL - Matt Bryant 36-yard field goal, 7:49. Falcons 16-6. **Drive: 9 plays, 62 yards, 4:50.**
- DAL - Kevin Ogletree 21-yard pass from Tony Romo (Dan Bailey kick), 5:21. Falcons 16-13. **Drive: 6 plays, 72 yards, 2:28.**
- ATL - Matt Bryant 32-yard field goal, 0:17. Falcons 19-13. **Drive: 12 plays, 66 yards, 5:04.**

**Top passers**

- DAL – Tony Romo - 25/35, 321 yards, TD
- ATL – Matt Ryan - 24/34, 342 yards

**Top rushers**

- DAL – Felix Jones - 9 carries, 39 yards
- ATL – Michael Turner - 20 carries, 102 yards, TD

**Top receivers**

- DAL – Kevin Ogletree - 3 receptions, 96 yards, TD
- ATL – Julio Jones - 5 receptions, 129 yards

**Top tacklers**

- DAL – Bruce Carter - 10 tackles, 9 solo
- ATL – Jonathan Babineaux - 7 tackles, 5 solo; Akeem Dent - 7 tackles, 4 solo

During this game, Jason Witten's 7 receptions brought him to a franchise record of 754, surpassing Michael Irvin's previous record of 750.

With the loss, the Cowboys fell to 3–5.

==== Week 10: at Philadelphia Eagles ====
Week Ten: Dallas Cowboys at Philadelphia Eagles – Game summary

Quarter	1	2	3	4	Total
**Cowboys**	7	3	7	21	**38**
Eagles	7	0	10	6	**23**

at Lincoln Financial Field, Philadelphia

- Date: November 11
- Game time: 4:25 p.m. EST/3:25 p.m. CST
- Game weather: 63 °F (17 °C), sunny
- Game attendance: 69,144
- Referee: Walt Coleman
- TV announcers (Fox): Joe Buck, Troy Aikman and Pam Oliver

Game information

**First quarter**

- PHI - Riley Cooper 2-yard pass from Michael Vick (Alex Henery kick), 9:53. Eagles 7–0. **Drive: 10 plays, 81 yards, 5:07.**
- DAL - Felix Jones 11-yard pass from Tony Romo (Dan Bailey kick), 2:13. Tied 7–7. **Drive: 13 plays, 80 yards, 7:40.**

**Second quarter**

- DAL - Dan Bailey 30-yard field goal, 3:50. Cowboys 10–7. **Drive: 5 plays, 57 yards, 2:10.**

**Third quarter**

- PHI - Jeremy Maclin 44-yard pass from Nick Foles (Alex Henery kick), 12:52. Eagles 14-10. **Drive: 3 plays, 62 yards, 1:13.**
- PHI - Alex Henery 40-yard field goal, 4:32. Eagles 17-10. **Drive: 9 plays, 50 yards, 6:10.**
- DAL - Dez Bryant 30-yard pass from Tony Romo (Dan Bailey kick), 0:00. Tied 17-17. **Drive: 8 plays, 80 yards, 4:32.**

**Fourth quarter**

- DAL - Dwayne Harris 78-yard punt return (Dan Bailey kick), 13:35. Cowboys 24-17.
- DAL - Brandon Carr 47-yard interception return (Dan Bailey kick), 12:25. Cowboys 31-17.
- PHI - Stanley Havili 1-yard run (Alex Henery kick failed), 1:55. Cowboys 31-23. **Drive: 10 plays, 77 yards, 3:31.**
- DAL - Jason Hatcher defensive fumble recovery in end zone (Dan Bailey kick), 0:46. Cowboys 38-23.

**Top passers**

- DAL – Tony Romo - 19/26, 209 yards, 2 TD
- PHI – Nick Foles - 22/32, 219 yards, TD, INT

**Top rushers**

- DAL – Felix Jones - 16 carries, 71 yards
- PHI – LeSean McCoy - 16 carries, 82 yards

**Top receivers**

- DAL – Dez Bryant - 3 receptions, 87 yards, TD
- PHI – Jeremy Maclin - 8 receptions, 93 yards, TD

**Top tacklers**

- DAL – Bruce Carter - 10 tackles, 10 solo
- PHI – DeMeco Ryans - 8 tackles, 7 solo; Kurt Coleman - 8 tackles, 6 solo

With the win, the Cowboys improved to 4–5.

==== Week 11: vs. Cleveland Browns ====
Week Eleven: Cleveland Browns at Dallas Cowboys – Game summary

Quarter	1	2	3	4	OT	Total
Browns	7	6	0	7	0	**20**
**Cowboys**	0	0	3	17	3	**23**

at Cowboys Stadium, Arlington, Texas

- Date: November 18
- Game time: 12:00 p.m. CST
- Game weather: Played indoors (retractable roof closed)
- Game attendance: 81,936
- Referee: Ed Hochuli
- TV announcers (CBS): Greg Gumbel and Dan Dierdorf

Game information

**First quarter**

- CLE - Ben Watson 10-yard pass from Brandon Weeden (Phil Dawson kick), 4:01. Browns 7-0. **Drive: 10 plays, 48 yards, 4:55.**

**Second quarter**

- CLE - Phil Dawson 51-yard field goal, 12:09. Browns 10-0. **Drive: 9 plays, 51 yards, 3:44.**
- CLE - Phil Dawson 37-yard field goal, 5:07. Browns 13-0. **Drive: 11 plays, 55 yards, 4:16.**

**Third quarter**

- DAL - Dan Bailey 44-yard field goal, 4:16. Browns 13-3. **Drive: 9 plays, 54 yards, 5:44.**

**Fourth quarter**

- DAL - Felix Jones 2-yard run (Dan Bailey kick), 13:49. Browns 13-10. **Drive: 8 plays, 89 yards, 3:59.**
- DAL - Dez Bryant 22-yard pass from Tony Romo (Dan Bailey kick), 6:46. Cowboys 17-13. **Drive: 9 plays, 58 yards, 5:11.**
- CLE - Ben Watson 17-yard pass from Brandon Weeden (Phil Dawson kick), 1:07. Browns 20-17. **Drive: 1 play, 17 yards, 0:03.**
- DAL - Dan Bailey 32-yard field goal, 0:02. Tied 20-20. **Drive: 8 plays, 66 yards, 1:05.**

**Overtime**

- DAL - Dan Bailey 38-yard field goal, 6:07. Cowboys 23-20. **Drive: 7 plays, 28 yards, 3:32.**

**Top passers**

- CLE – Brandon Weeden - 20/35, 210 yards, 2 TD
- DAL – Tony Romo - 35/50, 313 yards, TD

**Top rushers**

- CLE – Trent Richardson - 28 carries, 95 yards
- DAL – Felix Jones - 14 carries, 43 yards, TD

**Top receivers**

- CLE – Greg Little - 3 receptions, 53 yards; Josh Gordon - 5 receptions, 53 yards
- DAL – Dez Bryant - 12 receptions, 145 yards, TD

**Top tacklers**

- CLE – Sheldon Brown - 9 tackles, 9 solo
- DAL – Danny McCray - 8 tackles, 8 solo

After being down 13–0 against the Browns in the first half, the Cowboys outscored the Browns 20–7 to send the game into overtime. The Cowboys kicked the game-winning field goal and improved to 5–5 on the season and 2nd place in the NFC East.

==== Week 12: vs. Washington Redskins ====
Thanksgiving Day game

Week Twelve: Washington Redskins at Dallas Cowboys – Game summary

Quarter	1	2	3	4	Total
**Redskins**	0	28	0	10	**38**
Cowboys	3	0	10	18	**31**

at Cowboys Stadium, Arlington, Texas

- Date: November 22
- Game time: 3:25 p.m. CST
- Game weather: Played indoors (retractable roof closed)
- Game attendance: 90,166
- Referee: Bill Leavy
- TV announcers (Fox): Joe Buck, Troy Aikman, Pam Oliver and Erin Andrews

Game information

**First quarter**

- DAL - Dan Bailey 30-yard field goal, 9:17. Cowboys 3-0. **Drive: 9 plays, 37 yards, 4:40.**

**Second quarter**

- WAS - Aldrick Robinson 68-yard pass from Robert Griffin III (Kai Forbath kick), 13:47. Redskins 7-3. **Drive: 5 plays, 93 yards, 2:57.**
- WAS - Alfred Morris 1-yard run (Kai Forbath kick), 7:00. Redskins 14-3. **Drive: 6 plays, 49 yards, 3:37.**
- WAS - Pierre Garcon 59-yard pass from Robert Griffin III (Kai Forbath kick), 2:14. Redskins 21-3. **Drive: 5 plays, 71 yards, 3:01.**
- WAS - Santana Moss 6-yard pass from Robert Griffin III (Kai Forbath kick), 0:05. Redskins 28-3. **Drive: 4 plays, 33 yards, 0:25.**

**Third quarter**

- DAL - Dan Bailey 33-yard field goal, 11:48. Redskins 28-6. **Drive: 10 plays, 65 yards, 3:12.**
- DAL - Dez Bryant 85-yard pass from Tony Romo (Dan Bailey kick), 1:24. Redskins 28-13. **Drive: 1 play, 85 yards, 0:14.**

**Fourth quarter**

- WAS - Niles Paul 29-yard pass from Robert Griffin III (Kai Forbath kick), 12:48. Redskins 35-13. **Drive: 7 plays, 82 yards, 3:36.**
- DAL - Felix Jones 10-yard pass from Tony Romo (Tony Romo run), 9:54. Redskins 35-21. **Drive: 8 plays, 88 yards, 2:54.**
- DAL - Dez Bryant 11-yard pass from Tony Romo (Dan Bailey kick), 8:18. Redskins 35-28. **Drive: 4 plays, 18 yards, 0:41.**
- WAS - Kai Forbath 48-yard field goal, 2:58. Redskins 38-28. **Drive: 11 plays, 50 yards, 5:20.**
- DAL - Dan Bailey 51-yard field goal, 0:18. Redskins 38-31. **Drive: 13 plays, 46 yards, 2:40.**

**Top passers**

- WAS – Robert Griffin III - 19/27, 304 yards, 4 TD, INT
- DAL – Tony Romo - 37/62, 441 yards, 3 TD, 2 INT

**Top rushers**

- WAS – Alfred Morris - 24 carries, 113 yards, TD
- DAL – Felix Jones - 6 carries, 14 yards

**Top receivers**

- WAS – Pierre Garcon - 4 receptions, 86 yards, TD
- DAL – Dez Bryant - 8 receptions, 145 yards, 2 TD

**Top tacklers**

- WAS – Perry Riley - 9 tackles, 6 solo
- DAL – Anthony Spencer - 10 tackles, 7 solo

With the loss to their long-time rival the Washington Redskins during a Thanksgiving Day showdown, the Cowboys dropped to 5–6 on the season and 6–1 against the Redskins on Thanksgiving. Along with the loss, the Cowboys also lost 2 key defensive players for an extended period of time. Cornerback Orlando Scandrick broke his left hand, but the team was still hopeful that he would be able to return before the end of the season. But of the three injuries suffered during the game, Bruce Carter's was probably the most devastating. Carter dislocated his left elbow during the game and was out for the rest of the season after having surgery. At that point, the Cowboys had lost 4 starters on defense due to injuries, and were on their 3rd and 4th string middle linebackers after losing both Carter and Sean Lee for the season. Also the Cowboys lost starting receiver Miles Austin to a hip strain caused by linebacker London Fletcher in the back of the end zone. Although he did not return to the game, he was cleared to play for the Cowboys' week 13 game.

==== Week 13: vs. Philadelphia Eagles ====
Week Thirteen: Philadelphia Eagles at Dallas Cowboys – Game summary

Quarter	1	2	3	4	Total
Eagles	7	10	7	9	**33**
**Cowboys**	0	10	7	21	**38**

at Cowboys Stadium, Arlington, Texas

- Date: December 2
- Game time: 7:20 p.m. CST
- Game weather: Played indoors (retractable roof closed)
- Game attendance: 81,851
- Referee: Jeff Triplette
- TV announcers (NBC): Al Michaels, Cris Collinsworth and Michele Tafoya

Game information

**First quarter**

- PHI - Bryce Brown 10-yard run (Alex Henery kick), 5:38. Eagles 7–0. **Drive: 5 plays, 66 yards, 2:35.**

**Second quarter**

- DAL - Dan Bailey 39-yard field goal, 13:34, Eagles 7–3. **Drive: 15 plays, 59 yards, 7:04.**
- PHI - Bryce Brown 5-yard run (Alex Henery kick), 6:07. Eagles 14–3. **Drive: 7 plays, 73 yards, 3:47.**
- DAL - DeMarco Murray 1-yard run (Dan Bailey kick), 0:41. Eagles 14–10. **Drive: 11 plays, 75 yards, 5:26.**
- PHI - Alex Henery 43-yard field goal, 0:00. Eagles 17–10. **Drive: 6 plays, 58 yards, 0:41.**

**Third quarter**

- DAL - Dez Bryant 23-yard pass from Tony Romo (Dan Bailey kick), 11:18. Tied 17–17. **Drive: 7 plays, 80 yards, 3:42.**
- PHI - Riley Cooper 15-yard pass from Nick Foles (Alex Henery kick), 5:27. Eagles 24–17. **Drive: 11 plays, 80 yards, 5:51.**

**Fourth quarter**

- DAL - Miles Austin 27-yard pass from Tony Romo (Dan Bailey kick), 13:41. Tied 24–24. **Drive: 12 plays, 80 yards, 6:46.**
- PHI - Alex Henery 43-yard field goal, 9:51. Eagles 27–24. **Drive: 10 plays, 54 yards, 3:50.**
- DAL - Dez Bryant 6-yard pass from Tony Romo (Dan Bailey kick), 5:35. Cowboys 31–27. **Drive: 7 plays, 86 yards, 4:16.**
- DAL - Morris Claiborne 50-yard defensive fumble return (Dan Bailey kick), 3:50. Cowboys 38–27.
- PHI - Damaris Johnson 98-yard punt return (run failed), 0:31. Cowboys 38–33.

**Top passers**

- PHI – Nick Foles – 22/34, 251 yards, TD
- DAL – Tony Romo – 22/27, 303 yards, 3 TD

**Top rushers**

- PHI – Bryce Brown – 24 carries, 169 yards, 2 TD
- DAL – DeMarco Murray – 23 carries, 83 yards, TD

**Top receivers**

- PHI – Jason Avant – 4 receptions, 79 yards
- DAL – Jason Witten – 6 receptions, 108 yards

**Top tacklers**

- PHI – Nnamdi Asomugha – 8 tackles, 7 solo
- DAL – Danny McCray – 10 tackles, 7 solo

==== Week 14: at Cincinnati Bengals ====
Week Fourteen: Dallas Cowboys at Cincinnati Bengals – Game summary

Quarter	1	2	3	4	Total
**Cowboys**	3	7	0	10	**20**
Bengals	10	3	6	0	**19**

at Paul Brown Stadium, Cincinnati

- Date: December 9
- Game time: 1:00 p.m. EST/12:00 p.m. CST
- Game weather: 38 °F (3 °C), cloudy
- Game attendance: 63,590
- Referee: Bill Vinovich
- TV announcers (Fox): Thom Brennaman, Brian Billick, and Laura Okmin

Game information

**First quarter**

- DAL - Dan Bailey 37-yard field goal, 8:36. Cowboys 3–0. **Drive: 12 plays, 61 yards, 6:24.**
- CIN - Andrew Hawkins 8-yard pass from Andy Dalton (Josh Brown kick), 6:41. Bengals 7–3. **Drive: 5 plays, 71 yards, 1:55.**
- CIN - Josh Brown 25-yard field goal, 1:39. Bengals 10–3. **Drive: 8 plays, 40 yards, 3:58.**

**Second quarter**

- DAL - DeMarco Murray 1-yard run (Dan Bailey kick), 10:33. Tied 10–10. **Drive: 4 plays, 27 yards, 1:27.**
- CIN - Josh Brown 33-yard field goal, 3:24. Bengals 13–10. **Drive: 12 plays, 66 yards, 7:09.**

**Third quarter**

- CIN - Josh Brown 25-yard field goal, 9:22. Bengals 16–10. **Drive: 12 plays, 70 yards, 5:38.**
- CIN - Josh Brown 52-yard field goal, 6:45. Bengals 19–10. **Drive: 6 plays, 18 yards, 1:09.**

**Fourth quarter**

- DAL - Dez Bryant 27-yard pass from Tony Romo (Dan Bailey kick), 6:35. Bengals 19–17. **Drive: 8 plays, 68 yards, 3:12.**
- DAL - Dan Bailey 40-yard field goal, 0:00. Cowboys 20–19. **Drive: 13 plays, 50 yards, 3:44.**

**Top passers**

- DAL – Tony Romo – 25/43, 268 yards, TD, INT
- CIN – Andy Dalton – 20/33, 206 yards, TD, INT

**Top rushers**

- DAL – DeMarco Murray – 21 rushes, 53 yards, TD
- CIN – BenJarvus Green-Ellis – 12 rushes, 89 yards

**Top receivers**

- DAL – Jason Witten – 4 receptions, 62 yards
- CIN – Marvin Jones – 3 receptions, 45 yards

**Top tacklers**

- DAL – Anthony Spencer – 11 tackles, 5 solo
- CIN – Vontaze Burfict – 10 tackles, 6 solo

==== Week 15: vs. Pittsburgh Steelers ====
Week Fifteen: Pittsburgh Steelers at Dallas Cowboys – Game summary

Quarter	1	2	3	4	OT	Total
Steelers	0	10	7	7	0	**24**
**Cowboys**	3	7	7	7	3	**27**

at Cowboys Stadium, Arlington, Texas

- Date: December 16
- Game time: 3:25 p.m. CST
- Game weather: 72 °F (22 °C), clear skies (retractable roof open)
- Game attendance: 95,595
- Referee: Clete Blakeman
- TV announcers (CBS): Jim Nantz and Phil Simms

Game information

**First quarter**

- DAL - Dan Bailey 50-yard field goal, 8:36. Cowboys 3-0. **Drive: 10 plays, 56 yards, 4:31.**

**Second quarter**

- DAL - Jason Witten 17-yard pass from Tony Romo (Dan Bailey kick), 11:02. Cowboys 10-0. **Drive: 5 plays, 58 yards, 2:40.**
- PIT - Shaun Suisham 32-yard field goal, 6:03. Cowboys 10-3. **Drive: 12 plays, 66 yards, 4:59.**
- PIT - Heath Miller 30-yard pass from Ben Roethlisberger (Shaun Suisham kick), 0:34. Tied 10-10. **Drive: 7 plays, 73 yards, 1:37.**

**Third quarter**

- DAL - Dez Bryant 24-yard pass from Tony Romo (Dan Bailey kick), 6:03. Cowboys 17-10. **Drive: 9 plays, 80 yards, 5:32.**
- PIT - Jonathan Dwyer 1-yard run (Shaun Suisham kick), 4:16. Tied 17-17. **Drive: 3 plays, 60 yards, 1:47.**

**Fourth quarter**

- PIT - Antonio Brown 7-yard pass from Ben Roethlisberger (Shaun Suisham kick), 12:37. Steelers 24-17. **Drive: 7 plays, 78 yards, 3:16.**
- DAL - DeMarco Murray 3-yard run (Dan Bailey kick), 6:55. Tied 24-24. **Drive: 7 plays, 44 yards, 3:08.**

**Overtime**

- DAL - Dan Bailey 21-yard field goal, 13:36. Cowboys 27-24. **Drive: 2 plays, -2 yards, 0:39.**

**Top passers**

- PIT – Ben Roethlisberger - 24/40, 339 yards, 2 TD, INT
- DAL – Tony Romo - 30/42, 341 yards, 2 TD

**Top rushers**

- PIT – Isaac Redman - 3 carries, 30 yards
- DAL – DeMarco Murray - 14 carries, 81 yards, TD

**Top receivers**

- PIT – Mike Wallace - 4 receptions, 95 yards
- DAL – Miles Austin - 7 receptions, 79 yards

**Top tacklers**

- PIT – Ryan Clark - 8 tackles, 6 solo
- DAL – Danny McCray - 7 tackles, 5 solo

==== Week 16: vs. New Orleans Saints ====
Week Sixteen: New Orleans Saints at Dallas Cowboys – Game summary

Quarter	1	2	3	4	OT	Total
**Saints**	7	10	7	7	3	**34**
Cowboys	0	14	3	14	0	**31**

at Cowboys Stadium, Arlington, Texas

- Date: December 23
- Game time: 12:00 p.m. CST
- Game weather: Played indoors (retractable roof closed)
- Game attendance: 92,570
- Referee: Walt Coleman
- TV announcers (Fox): Kenny Albert, Daryl Johnston and Tony Siragusa

Game information

**First quarter**

- NO - Mark Ingram 9-yard run (Garrett Hartley kick), 10:25. Saints 7-0. **Drive: 10 plays, 80 yards, 4:35.**

**Second quarter**

- DAL - Dez Bryant 58-yard pass from Tony Romo (Dan Bailey kick), 12:47. Tied 7-7. **Drive: 3 plays, 74 yards, 1:28.**
- DAL - Dez Bryant 58-yard pass from Tony Romo (Dan Bailey kick), 5:43. Cowboys 14-7. **Drive: 5 plays, 75 yards, 3:23.**
- NO - Lance Moore 6-yard pass from Drew Brees (Garrett Hartley kick), 1:11. Tied 14-14. **Drive: 12 plays, 90 yards, 4:32.**
- NO - Garrett Hartley 37-yard field goal, 0:00. Saints 17-14. **Drive: 5 plays, 51 yards, 0:47.**

**Third quarter**

- DAL - Dan Bailey 47-yard field goal, 10:26. Tied 17-17. **Drive: 9 plays, 47 yards, 4:34.**
- NO - Pierre Thomas 5-yard pass from Drew Brees (Garrett Hartley kick), 4:03. Saints 24-17. **Drive: 3 plays, 5 yards, 0:14.**

**Fourth quarter**

- NO - David Thomas 3-yard pass from Drew Brees (Garrett Hartley kick), 11:10. Saints 31-17. **Drive: 10 plays, 98 yards, 4:53.**
- DAL - Dwayne Harris 16-yard pass from Tony Romo (Dan Bailey kick), 3:35. Saints 31-24. **Drive: 5 plays, 80 yards, 1:10.**
- DAL - Miles Austin 19-yard pass from Tony Romo (Dan Bailey kick), 0:15. Tied 31-31. **Drive: 7 plays, 64 yards, 1:14.**

**Overtime**

- NO - Garrett Hartley 20-yard field goal, 10:33. Saints 34-31. **Drive: 7 plays, 72 yards, 3:00.**

**Top passers**

- NO – Drew Brees - 37/53, 446 yards, 3 TD
- DAL – Tony Romo - 26/43, 416 yards, 4 TD

**Top rushers**

- NO – Mark Ingram - 21 carries, 53 yards, TD
- DAL – DeMarco Murray - 11 carries, 40 yards

**Top receivers**

- NO – Marques Colston - 10 receptions, 153 yards
- DAL – Dez Bryant - 9 receptions, 224 yards, 2 TD

**Top tacklers**

- NO – Patrick Robinson - 8 tackles, 7 solo
- DAL – Dan Connor - 11 tackles, 7 solo

The loss dropped Dallas to 8–7 and mathematically eliminated them from gaining a wild card spot. However, if they were to beat the Washington Redskins in week 17, Dallas would win the NFC East.

==== Week 17: at Washington Redskins ====
Week Seventeen: Dallas Cowboys at Washington Redskins – Game summary

Quarter	1	2	3	4	Total
Cowboys	0	7	0	11	**18**
**Redskins**	0	7	7	14	**28**

at FedExField, Landover, Maryland

- Date: December 30
- Game time: 8:20 p.m. EST/7:20 p.m. CST
- Game weather: 37 °F (3 °C), cloudy
- Game attendance: 82,845
- Referee: Walt Anderson
- TV announcers (NBC): Al Michaels, Cris Collinsworth and Michele Tafoya

Game information

**First quarter**

- No scoring plays

**Second quarter**

- DAL - Jason Witten 9-yard pass from Tony Romo (Dan Bailey kick), 7:59. Cowboys 7-0. **Drive: 13 plays, 89 yards, 7:37.**
- WAS - Alfred Morris 17-yard run (Kai Forbath kick), 3:28. Tied 7-7. **Drive: 8 plays, 68 yards, 4:31.**

**Third quarter**

- WAS - Robert Griffin III 10-yard run (Kai Forbath kick), 3:10. Redskins 14-7. **Drive: 9 plays, 84 yards, 5:14.**

**Fourth quarter**

- DAL - Dan Bailey 48-yard field goal, 14:09. Redskins 14-10. **Drive: 10 plays, 44 yards, 4:01.**
- WAS - Alfred Morris 32-yard run (Kai Forbath kick), 10:32. Redskins 21-10. **Drive: 6 plays, 74 yards, 3:37.**
- DAL - Kevin Ogletree 10-yard pass from Tony Romo (Dwayne Harris pass from Tony Romo), 5:50. Redskins 21-18. **Drive: 3 plays, 16 yards, 0:45.**
- WAS - Alfred Morris 1-yard run (Kai Forbath kick), 1:09. Redskins 28-18. **Drive: 6 plays, 25 yards, 1:51.**

**Top passers**

- DAL – Tony Romo – 20/37, 218 yards, 2 TD, 3 INT
- WAS – Robert Griffin III – 9/18, 100 yards

**Top rushers**

- DAL – DeMarco Murray – 17 carries, 76 yards
- WAS – Alfred Morris – 33 carries, 200 yards, 3 TD

**Top receivers**

- DAL – Dez Bryant – 4 receptions, 71 yards
- WAS – Pierre Garçon – 3 receptions, 46 yards

**Top tacklers**

- DAL – Dan Connor – 9 tackles, 5 solo
- WAS – London Fletcher – 11 tackles, 4 solo

With the loss, Dallas ended the season with an 8–8 record, and missed the playoffs for the third straight season. The Cowboys loss marks their third season finale loss in the last five seasons where they faced a win-or-go-home situation for the playoffs. All those season finale games came against NFC East opponents. In 2008, they lost 44–6 to the Philadelphia Eagles failing to clinch a wild card spot. In 2011, they lost 31–14 to the New York Giants failing to win the NFC East title. The loss also brought their record in Week 17 games to 2–11 since 2000.

==== Season recap ====
The Cowboys started the season on September 5, playing a Wednesday game for the first time in franchise history.

Against the Philadelphia Eagles on November 11 during the fourth quarter, the Cowboys became the second team in NFL history to score touchdowns via interception, fumble return and punt return in the same quarter. The first one was the San Francisco 49ers in 1966.

== Standings ==
NFC East
	W	L	T	PCT	DIV	CONF	PF	PA	STK
^{(4)} Washington Redskins	10	6	0	.625	5–1	8–4	436	388	W7
New York Giants	9	7	0	.563	3–3	8–4	429	344	W1
Dallas Cowboys	8	8	0	.500	3–3	5–7	376	400	L2
Philadelphia Eagles	4	12	0	.250	1–5	2–10	280	444	L3

== Footnotes ==
^{^[a]} The Week 17 game was originally going to be aired on Fox which, due to playoff implications, competed with NBC for the slot. The game was ultimately moved to NBC.
