= Ben Bass =

Ben Bass may refer to:

- Ben Bass (actor) (born 1968), American-Canadian television and stage actor
- Ben Bass (American football) (born 1989), American football player for the Dallas Cowboys
