= Barry Church =

American football player (born 1988)

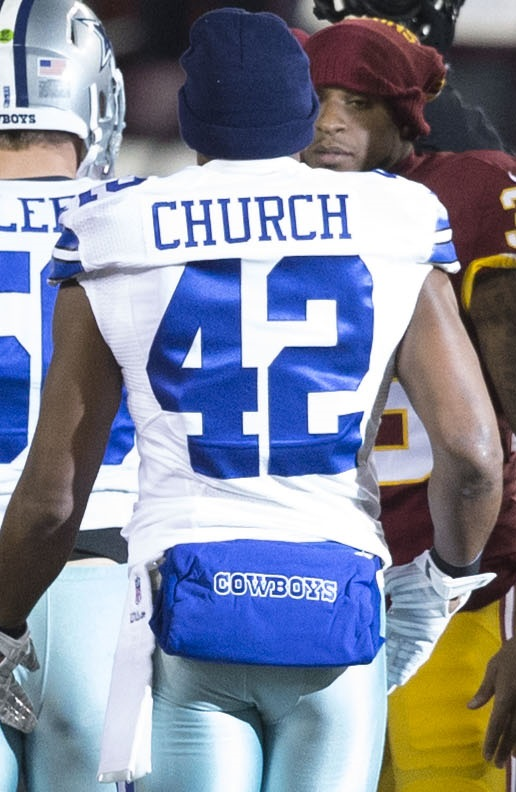
- Church with the Dallas Cowboys in 2015

No. 42
- Position: Safety

Personal information
- Born: February 11, 1988 (age 38); Pittsburgh, Pennsylvania, U.S.
- Listed height: 6 ft 2 in (1.88 m)
- Listed weight: 218 lb (99 kg)

Career information
- High school: Penn Hills (Pittsburgh)
- College: Toledo
- NFL draft: 2010: undrafted

Career history
- Dallas Cowboys (2010–2016); Jacksonville Jaguars (2017–2018)

Awards and highlights
- 4× All-MAC (2006–2009)

Career NFL statistics
- Total tackles: 600
- Sacks: 2
- Interceptions: 10
- Pass deflections: 26
- Forced fumbles: 8
- Fumble recoveries: 3
- Defensive touchdowns: 2
- Stats at Pro Football Reference

Barry Michael Church (born February 11, 1988) is an American former professional football player who was a safety in the National Football League (NFL). He played college football for the Toledo Rockets and signed with the Dallas Cowboys as an undrafted free agent in 2010. Church also played for the Jacksonville Jaguars.

== Early life ==
Church attended Penn Hills High School, where he was a two-sport star in football and track. In football, Church recorded 80 tackles, nine sacks, and four interceptions while playing safety as a senior, that year he also played wide receiver, catching 30 passes for 670 yards and four touchdowns. Church was named to the Pittsburgh Tribune-Review's "Terrific 25" team, second-team all-state Class AAAA, first-team Western Pennsylvania Interscholastic Athletic League-East honors, and played in the Big 33 Football Classic.

Also a standout track & field athlete, Church was one of the state's top performers in the triple jump event, and captured the state title at the 2005 PTFCA Indoor State Championships with a leap of 14.32 meters (46 ft, 7 in). He also recorded a 4.47-second 40-yard dash at the Metro Index camp.

== College career ==
Church accepted a football scholarship from the University of Toledo, where he was a four-year starter at safety. As a freshman, he registered 76 tackles (second on the team) and 4 interceptions, including 2 returned for touchdowns (tied school record). Church had 10 tackles against Iowa State University. He returned an interception 84 yards for a fourth-quarter touchdown in a 37–31 victory over the University of Kansas, that included two overtime periods. Church was named second-team freshman All-American by The Sporting News.

As a sophomore, Church posted 92 tackles (third on the team), six tackles for loss (second on the team), three interceptions (tied for the team lead) and 4 passes defensed. He had a career-high 19 tackles (three for loss) against Iowa State University and had 13 tackles and one interception against Western Michigan University.

As a junior, Church collected 93 tackles (second on the team), 5.5 tackles for loss, 6 passed defensed (led the team), 3 forced fumbles (led the team), and an interception. He had 10 tackles (one for loss) and one forced fumble against Miami University and made 10 tackles and one interception against Western Michigan University.

As a senior, Church was second on the team with 98 tackles, including 8.5 tackles for loss, an interception, a forced fumble, two pass deflections, and three blocked kicks. He had 14 tackles (three for loss) against Ball State University and blocked two field goals in the 20–19 win over Northern Illinois University, including the potential game-tying score with 37 seconds left. Church was one of the semifinalists for the Jim Thorpe Award and also played in the East-West Shrine Game.

Church finished his collegiate career with 354 tackles, 26 tackles for loss, nine interceptions, 18 pass breakups, forced fumbles, and three blocked kicks. He was selected first-team All-MAC four straight years, becoming the first Toledo and the third Mid-American Conference player ever to achieve that distinction.

== Professional career ==
External videos
- Barry Church's NFL Combine workout

Pre-draft measurables
Height	Weight	Arm length	Hand span	40-yard dash	10-yard split	20-yard split	20-yard shuttle	Three-cone drill	Vertical jump	Broad jump	Bench press
6 ft 1 1/2 in (1.87 m)	222 lb (101 kg)	33 1/4 in (0.84 m)	9 3/8 in (0.24 m)	4.64 s	1.58 s	2.78 s	4.17 s	6.65 s	36 in (0.91 m)	10 ft 1 in (3.07 m)	19 reps
All values from NFL Combine/Pro Day

=== Dallas Cowboys ===
==== 2010 season ====
On April 25, 2010, the Dallas Cowboys signed Church to a three-year, $1.22 million contract that includes a $3,500 signing bonus after he went undrafted during the 2010 NFL draft.

Throughout training camp, Church competed for a roster spot as a backup safety against Michael Hamlin, Patrick Watkins, Akwasi Owusu-Ansah, and Danny McCray. Head coach Wade Phillips named Church the backup strong safety, behind veteran Gerald Sensabaugh, to start the regular season.

Church made his NFL debut during Week 2 against the Chicago Bears after being inactive for their season-opener. He finished 27–20 loss with one assisted tackle. Church made his first career tackle with teammate Danny McCray on Danieal Manning during a 21-yard kick return by Manning in the second quarter. During Week 8, Church collected a season-high four combined tackles during a 35–17 loss to the Jacksonville Jaguars. On November 9, 2010, the Cowboys fired head coach Wade Phillips after a 45–7 road loss to the Green Bay Packers and falling to a 1–7 record.

Church finished his rookie season with 20 combined tackles (15 solo) in 15 games and no starts. He finished fourth on the team with 16 tackles on special teams.

==== 2011 season ====
Church returned to training camp in 2011 and competed for a role as a backup safety against Andrew Sendejo, Danny McCray, Akwasi Owusu-Ansah, and Michael Hamlin. New head coach Jason Garrett named him the backup behind Gerald Sensabaugh and Abram Elam to start the regular season.

During Week 4, Church recorded a season-high six combined tackles in a 34–30 loss to the Detroit Lions. On December 11, 2011, he earned his first NFL start and recorded two solo tackles before leaving the eventual 37–34 loss to the New York Giants in the third quarter with a shoulder injury. Church was placed on injured reserve two days later after discovering his shoulder would require surgery to repair the AC joint.

Church finished his second professional season with 28 combined tackles (21 solo) in 13 games and one start.

==== 2012 season ====
After two seasons of increasing playing time as a hybrid linebacker and safety, Church returned to training camp and competed for the job as the starting strong safety against Brodney Pool. Church was named the starting strong safety, alongside free safety Gerald Sensabaugh, to start season.

Church started the season-opener at the New York Giants and recorded two combined tackles in a 24–17 victory. Two weeks later, he made a season-high three solo tackles in a 16–10 victory over the Tampa Bay Buccaneers, but left in the third quarter after sustaining a torn Achilles. He underwent surgery to repair the tendon two days later. Church finished his last season under defensive coordinator Rob Ryan with six combined tackles (four solo) in three games and three starts.

Still rehabbing from a serious injury, the Cowboys took a gamble that Church would make a full recovery and on October 26, 2012, signed him to a four-year, $8.82 million contract extension that included $3.32 million guaranteed and a signing bonus of $2.5 million.

==== 2013 season ====
Throughout training camp, Church competed for the job as the starting free safety against rookie J. J. Wilcox and Matt Johnson after it was left vacant by the retirement of Gerald Sensabaugh. Defensive coordinator Monte Kiffin named him the starting free safety, along with strong safety Will Allen, to start the regular season.

On October 20, 2013, Church recorded five combined tackles, broke up a pass, and made his first NFL interception off quarterback Matt Barkley during a 17–3 road victory over the Philadelphia Eagles. During Week 10, he collected a season-high 14 combined tackles (nine solo) in a 49–17 road loss to the New Orleans Saints. Two weeks later, Church made 13 combined tackles (eight solo) in a 24–21 road victory over the New York Giants. When injuries impacted the depth at linebacker, he also provided help by playing linebacker on passing situations. Church finished his first full season as a starter leading the team with 147 combined tackles (107 solo), six pass deflections, three forced fumbles (led the team), and an interception in 16 games and starts.

==== 2014 season ====
Church entered training camp slated as the starting free safety with starting strong safety J.J. Wilcox. During Week 12, Church recorded eight solo tackles, deflected a pass, and returned an interception by Eli Manning for a 45-yard gain during a 35–28 road victory over the New York Giants. In the next game, he collected a season-high 11 combined tackles (nine solo) and broke up a pass in a 33–10 loss to the Philadelphia Eagles. Church led the team with 110 combined tackles (77 solo), six pass deflections, two interceptions, and a forced fumble in 16 starts.

The Cowboys finished atop the NFC East with a 12–4 record and received a playoff berth. On January 4, 2015, Church started in his first NFL playoff game and recorded four combined tackles during a 24–20 victory against the Detroit Lions in the NFC Wildcard Game. The following week, he made eight combined tackles during the 26–21 road loss to the Green Bay Packers in the NFL Divisional Game.

==== 2015 season ====
Defensive coordinator Rod Marinelli opted to retain Church and Wilcox as the starting safety duo after assistant head coach/co-defensive coordinator Monte Kiffin was not re-signed during the off-season.

During a Week 10 10–6 road loss to the Tampa Bay Buccaneers, Church collected a season-high 11 combined tackles (nine solo). On December 13, 2015, he tied his season-high of 11 combined tackles (nine solo) during a 28–7 loss at the Green Bay Packers. Two weeks later against the Buffalo Bills, Church recorded seven combined tackles, but left the eventual 16–6 road loss in the fourth quarter after breaking his arm. He was expected to be in a cast for 6–8 weeks and missed the regular-season finale. Church finished second on the team with 136 combined tackles (78 solo) and a forced fumble in 15 games and starts.

==== 2016 season ====
Head coach Jason Garrett named Church the starting strong safety, alongside starting free safety Byron Jones.

During a Week 2 27–23 road victory over the Washington Redskins, Church made five combined tackles, broke up a pass, and intercepted a pass by Kirk Cousins in the endzone. The interception set up the Cowboys' game-winning drive. During a Week 6 30–16 road victory over the Green Bay Packers, Church had five tackles, a forced fumble, a pass defended, and a third-quarter interception. Two weeks later against the Philadelphia Eagles, he made three combined tackles before leaving the eventual 29–23 victory in the third quarter after fracturing his forearm during a touchdown drive by the Eagles. He was sidelined for four consecutive games (Weeks 9–12) due to the injury, but returned in Week 13 and opted to play with a cast on.

During a Week 16 42–21 victory over the Detroit Lions, Church collected a season-high 12 combined tackles (seven solo). He finished the 2016 season with 85 combined tackles (61 solo), four passes defended, and two interceptions in 12 games and starts. Church received an overall grade of 86.2 from Pro Football Focus in 2016 and ranked ninth among all qualifying safeties.

The Cowboys finished atop the NFC East with a 13–3 record and received a first-round bye. In the Divisional Round against the Green Bay Packers, Church made four combined tackles and made his first NFL sack on Aaron Rodgers as the Cowboys narrowly lost by a score of 34–31.

=== Jacksonville Jaguars ===
On March 9, 2017, the Jacksonville Jaguars signed Church to a four-year, $26 million contract that includes $12 million guaranteed. Head coach Doug Marrone named Church the starting strong safety, along with free safety Tashaun Gipson, after it was left vacant due to Johnathan Cyprien's departure to the Tennessee Titans in free agency.

==== 2017 season ====
During a Week 4 23–20 road loss to the New York Jets, Church made six combined tackles and sacked quarterback Josh McCown once. In the next game, Church recorded five combined tackles, deflected a pass, and returned an interception by Ben Roethlisberger for a 51-yard touchdown during a 30–9 road victory over the Pittsburgh Steelers. It marked his second touchdown in eight seasons. The Jaguars' defense set a franchise record by intercepting five passes by Roethlisberger during their game. During a Week 12 27–24 road loss to the Arizona Cardinals, he collected a season-high nine combined tackles, broke up a pass, and intercepted a pass by Carson Palmer.

Church finished his first season with the Jaguars with 72 combined tackles (58 solo), eight pass deflections, four interceptions, 1.5 sacks, and a touchdown in 16 games and starts. The Jaguars finished atop the AFC South with a 10–6 record to clinch a playoff berth. They defeated the Buffalo Bills by a score of 10–3 in the AFC Wildcard Game and went on to narrowly defeat the Steelers on the road 45–42 in the AFC Divisional round. Church recorded seven combined tackles in the game against the Steelers. On January 21, 2018, Church made a tackle during a 24–20 loss on the road against the New England Patriots. He drew criticism and received a personal foul after delivering a hit to tight end Rob Gronkowski's head during the second quarter. Gronkowski did not return after he suffered a concussion. On January 26, 2018, Church was fined $24,309 for the hit. Pro Football Focus gave Church an overall grade of 83.2 in 2017, ranking him 22nd among all qualifying safeties.

==== 2018 season ====
Church entered the 2018 season slated as the starting strong safety alongside free safety Tashaun Gipson. He started the first 11 games, but was benched in Weeks 13 and 14 in favor of rookie Ronnie Harrison due to mistakes in pass coverage. On December 14, 2018, Church was released after officially losing the starting job. He finished the 2018 season with 38 tackles (32 solo), a sack, an interception, and two passes defended.

=== NFL statistics ===
==== Regular season ====
Year	Team	Games		Tackles				Interceptions						Fumbles			
Year	Team	GP	GS	Comb	Total	Ast	Sack	PD	INT	Yds	Avg	Lng	TD	FF	FR	Yds	TD
2010	DAL	15	0	20	15	5	0.0	0	0	0	0.0	0	0	1	0	0	0
2011	DAL	13	1	28	21	7	0.0	0	0	0	0.0	0	0	0	0	0	0
2012	DAL	3	3	6	4	2	0.0	0	0	0	0.0	0	0	0	1	6	0
2013	DAL	16	16	135	107	28	0.0	6	1	0	0.0	0	0	3	1	27	1
2014	DAL	16	16	97	77	20	0.0	6	2	49	24.5	45	0	2	1	−1	0
2015	DAL	15	15	117	78	39	0.0	0	0	0	0.0	0	0	1	0	0	0
2016	DAL	12	12	85	61	24	0.0	4	2	14	7.0	14	0	1	0	0	0
2017	JAX	16	16	74	58	16	1.5	8	4	51	12.8	51T	1	0	0	0	0
2018	JAX	11	11	38	32	6	0.5	2	1	11	11.0	11	0	0	0	0	0
Career		117	90	600	453	147	2.0	26	10	125	12.5	51T	1	8	3	32	1

==== Postseason ====
Year	Team	Games		Tackles				Interceptions						Fumbles			
Year	Team	GP	GS	Comb	Total	Ast	Sack	PD	INT	Yds	Avg	Lng	TD	FF	FR	Yds	TD
2014	DAL	2	2	12	10	2	0.0	0	0	0	0.0	0	0	1	0	0	0
2016	DAL	1	1	4	2	2	1.0	0	0	0	0.0	0	0	0	0	0	0
2017	JAX	3	3	13	10	3	0.0	0	0	0	0.0	0	0	0	0	0	0
Career		6	6	29	22	7	1.0	0	0	0	0.0	0	0	1	0	0	0

== Personal life ==
Church is currently a presenter on the Cover 4 web show at dallascowboys.com.
