= Andre Holmes =

American football player (born 1988)

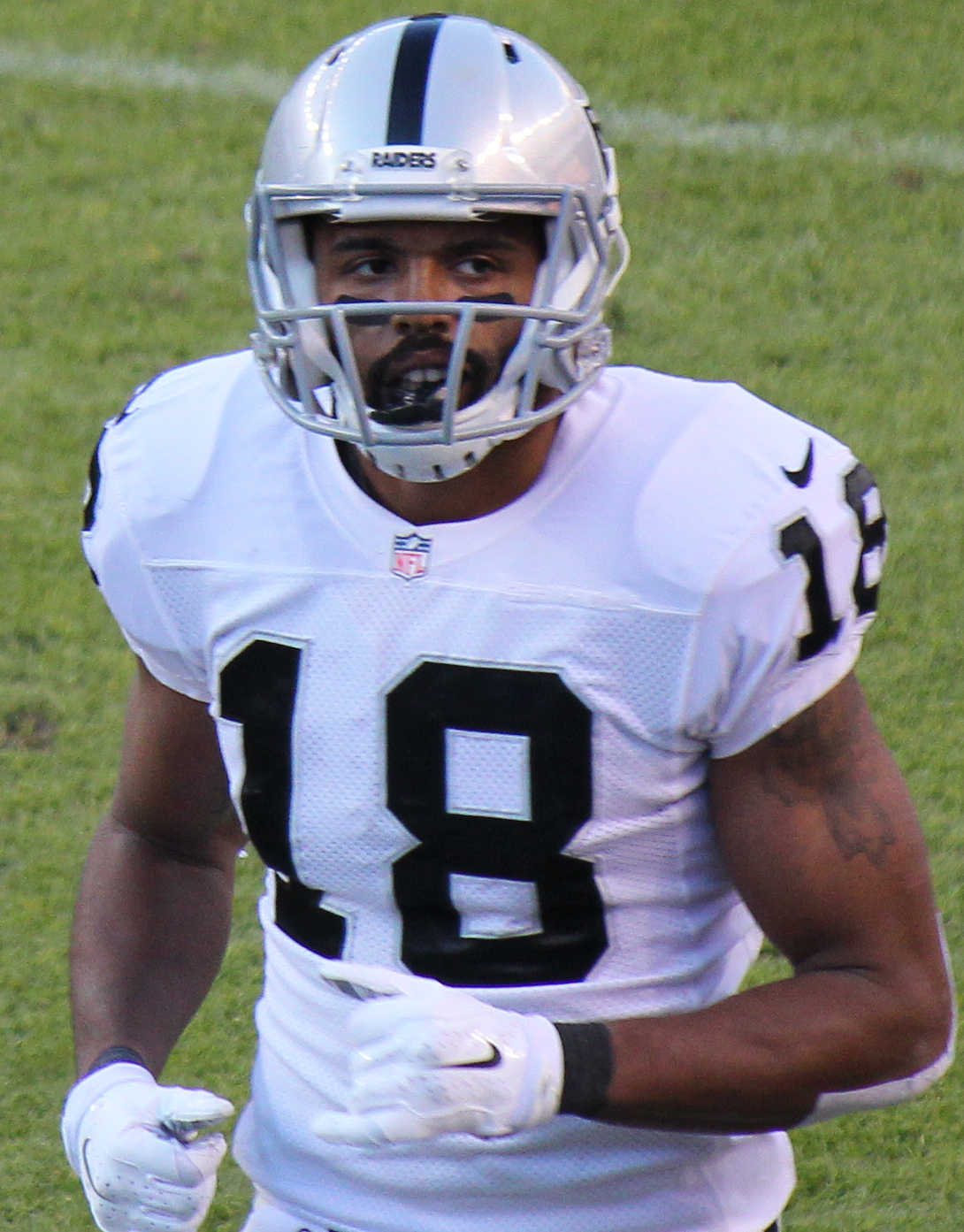
- Holmes with the Oakland Raiders in 2014

No. 15, 18, 19
- Position: Wide receiver

Personal information
- Born: June 16, 1988 (age 38); Hoffman Estates, Illinois, U.S.
- Listed height: 6 ft 4 in (1.93 m)
- Listed weight: 210 lb (95 kg)

Career information
- High school: James B. Conant (Hoffman Estates, Illinois)
- College: Hillsdale
- NFL draft: 2011: undrafted

Career history
- Minnesota Vikings (2011)*; Dallas Cowboys (2011–2012); New England Patriots (2012–2013)*; Oakland Raiders (2013–2016); Buffalo Bills (2017–2018); Denver Broncos (2018)
- * Offseason or practice squad member only

Career NFL statistics
- Receptions: 128
- Receiving yards: 1,744
- Receiving touchdowns: 15
- Stats at Pro Football Reference

Andre Holmes (born June 16, 1988) is an American former professional football player who was a wide receiver in the National Football League (NFL). He played college football for the Hillsdale Chargers from 2007 to 2010 and holds the school's all-time record for receiving yardage. Holmes was signed by the Minnesota Vikings as an undrafted free agent in 2011 and has also played for the Dallas Cowboys, Oakland Raiders, Buffalo Bills, and Denver Broncos.

== Early life ==
Holmes attended James B. Conant High School, where he started at wide receiver for only one season. His football coaches were Dave Pendergast and Bill Modelski. Holmes also participated in basketball, where he was coached by Tom McCormack and Jeff Stewart.

In track and field, Holmes set PR of 6.85 meters in the long jump and 14.06 meters in triple jump. He was also a member of the 4 × 200m relay (1:29.66).

== College career ==
Holmes accepted a football scholarship from NCAA Division II Hillsdale College, where he was coached by Keith Otterbein.

As a sophomore, Holmes became a starter at wide receiver.

As a junior, Holmes started all 12 games, posting 77 receptions for 1,076 yards.

As a senior, Holmes set single-season school records with 104 receptions for 1,368 yards and 11 touchdowns. He set a single-game school record in the team's first-round playoff game against St. Cloud State University with 16 receptions for 208 yards and two touchdowns.

Holmes finished his college career as the school's All-time receiver with 219 receptions for 3,092 yards. Holmes was twice named ALL-GLIAC and a Division II All-American honorable-mention. He was also invited to play in the Texas vs. The Nation college football all-star game.

Holmes was also a member of the track and field team, winning the GLIAC title in the outdoor triple jump at the conference championships in 2006.

== Professional career ==
Pre-draft measurables
Height	Weight	Arm length	Hand span	40-yard dash	10-yard split	20-yard split	20-yard shuttle	Three-cone drill	Vertical jump	Broad jump	Bench press
6 ft 4 3/8 in (1.94 m)	210 lb (95 kg)	34 in (0.86 m)	8 5/8 in (0.22 m)	4.45 s	1.58 s	2.60 s	4.31 s	6.69 s	35 in (0.89 m)	10 ft 10 in (3.30 m)	11 reps
All values from NFL Combine/Pro Day

=== Minnesota Vikings ===
Holmes was signed as an undrafted free agent by the Minnesota Vikings on July 27, 2011, due to his small school background. Holmes was waived on August 29.

=== Dallas Cowboys ===
On September 5, 2011, Holmes was signed to the Dallas Cowboys' practice squad. He was promoted to the active roster on December 9, but suffered a hamstring injury and did not play in the last four games of the season.

Holmes was waived by the Cowboys on November 24, 2012. However, the Cowboys signed him to their practice squad three days later as a replacement to Danny Coale, but Holmes was not re-signed at the end of the season.

=== New England Patriots ===
Holmes was signed by New England Patriots on January 8, 2013, to the practice squad. He was waived on May 10.

=== Oakland Raiders ===
Holmes was claimed off waivers by the Oakland Raiders on May 13, 2013. On July 27, he was suspended for the first four games of the 2013 season due to violating the league's performance-enhancing drugs policy. The Raiders activated Holmes to their roster on October 7, filling the open roster spot after the release of quarterback Matt Flynn.

On January 7, 2017, Holmes caught his first career postseason touchdown from quarterback Connor Cook in the Raiders' 27–14 wildcard round loss to the Houston Texans.

=== Buffalo Bills ===
On March 18, 2017, Holmes signed a three-year, $6.5 million contract with the Buffalo Bills. On September 10, in the season-opening 21–12 victory over the New York Jets, he recorded his first touchdown as a Bill, a one-yard pass from quarterback Tyrod Taylor. Holmes was placed on injured reserve on December 26, 2017, with a neck injury.

During the 2018 season, Holmes played in over 70% of special team snaps for the Bills. On December 4, 2018, Holmes was released.

=== Denver Broncos ===
On December 5, 2018, Holmes was claimed off waivers by the Denver Broncos. On December 28, he was placed on injured reserve. Holmes was released on January 23, 2019.

== NFL career statistics ==
=== Regular season ===
Year	Team	Games		Receiving					Fumbles	
Year	Team	GP	GS	Rec	Yds	Avg	Lng	TD	Fum	Lost
2012	DAL	7	0	2	11	5.5	7	0	0	0
2013	OAK	10	4	25	431	17.2	40	1	0	0
2014	OAK	16	13	47	693	14.7	77T	4	0	0
2015	OAK	16	1	14	201	14.4	49T	4	0	0
2016	OAK	16	2	14	126	9.0	23	3	0	0
2017	BUF	14	2	13	120	9.2	36	3	0	0
2018	BUF	12	3	12	157	13.1	24	0	0	0
2018	DEN	3	0	1	5	5.0	5	0	0	0
Career		94	25	128	1,744	13.6	77T	15	0	0

=== Postseason ===
Year	Team	Games		Receiving					Fumbles	
Year	Team	GP	GS	Rec	Yds	Avg	Lng	TD	Fum	Lost
2016	OAK	1	0	4	50	12.5	20	1	0	0
Career		1	0	4	50	12.5	20	1	0	0

== Personal life ==
Holmes' father, Kevin, played college basketball for DePaul in the 1980s. His younger brother, Jason, a former college basketball player at Mississippi Valley State and Morehead State, played Australian rules football professionally with St Kilda in the Australian Football League.
