= Caleb McSurdy =

American football player (born 1990)

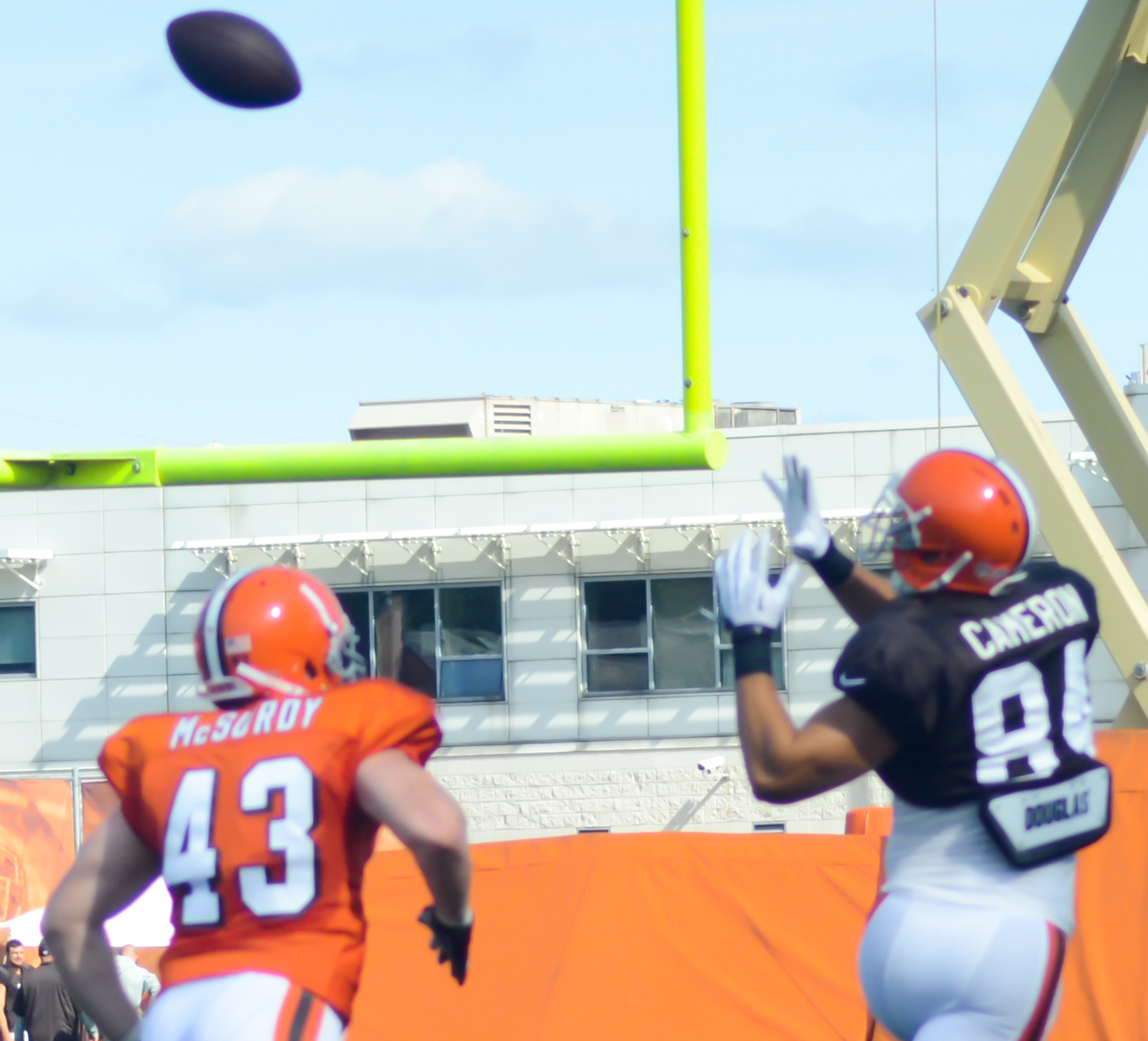
- McSurdy (left) with the Cleveland Browns in 2014

No. 56
- Position: Linebacker

Personal information
- Born: February 24, 1990 (age 36); Boise, Idaho, U.S.
- Listed height: 6 ft 1 in (1.85 m)
- Listed weight: 241 lb (109 kg)

Career information
- High school: Borah (Boise)
- College: Montana
- NFL draft: 2012: 7th round, 222nd overall pick

Career history
- Dallas Cowboys (2012); St. Louis Rams (2013–2014)*; Cleveland Browns (2014)*
- * Offseason or practice squad member only

Awards and highlights
- FCS All-American (2011); Big Sky defensive player of the year (2011); All-Big Sky (2011); Second-team All-Big Sky (2010)
- Stats at Pro Football Reference

Caleb McSurdy (born February 24, 1990) is an American former professional football player who was a linebacker in the National Football League (NFL). He played college football for the Montana Grizzlies.

== Early life ==
Born and raised in Boise, Idaho, McSurdy attended Borah High School, where he practiced football and track. He received All-conference honors three straight times and was a team captain in football as a junior and senior.

In his last year, he was an All-state linebacker and tight end, recording 65 tackles, 22 receptions for 232 yards and four touchdowns.

== College career ==
McSurdy accepted a football scholarship from the University of Montana in Missoula. As a true freshman with the Grizzlies, he registered 18 tackles and one forced fumble in 16 games.

As a sophomore, he collected 32 tackles in 15 games. He also finished fourth in the 2010 Big Sky Conference track and field meet, with a discus throw of 161’, 2 1/4”.

As a junior, McSurdy became a starter at middle linebacker, leading the team with 112 tackles, while making seven tackles for loss (forth on the team). Against Montana State University, he tallied a career-high 17 tackles. Against Weber State University, he had 16 tackles. He also received All-League Academic honors for the third consecutive year.

As a senior, he finished with 130 tackles (led the team), 7.5 tackles for loss, four sacks (second on the team) and two interceptions, including one returned for a 61-yards touchdown. Against California Polytechnic State University he had 17 tackles. Against Western Oregon University, he had 14 tackles, two quarterback hurries and one forced fumble.

== Professional career ==
=== Dallas Cowboys ===
McSurdy was selected in the seventh round (222nd overall) of the 2012 NFL draft by the Dallas Cowboys. He was selected with the intention of playing him at inside linebacker in the Cowboys' 3-4 defense and also at fullback. He suffered an Achilles injury in training camp and was placed on the injured reserve list on August 26, 2012.

The next year the defense changed to a 4-3 scheme, with him competing for the backup position at middle linebacker. He was released on August 31, 2013.

=== St. Louis Rams ===
The St. Louis Rams signed him to their practice squad on December 10, 2013. He was waived on July 21, 2014.

=== Cleveland Browns ===
The Cleveland Browns signed him on August 13, 2014. He was released on August 24.
