= Jason Holmes =

American-born Australian rules footballer

Personal information
- Full name: Jason Holmes
- Born: October 28, 1989 (age 37); Chicago, Illinois, United States
- Draft: No. 36, 2014 rookie draft
- Height: 203 cm (6 ft 8 in)
- Weight: 105 kg (231 lb)
- Position: Ruckman

Playing career^{1}
Years	Club	Games (Goals)
2014–2017	St Kilda	5 (0)
- ^{1} Playing statistics correct to the end of 2017.

Jason Holmes (born October 28, 1989) is an American-born former professional Australian rules footballer who played for the St Kilda Football Club in the Australian Football League (AFL). He was the first born and raised American to ever play in the AFL.

== Early life ==
Holmes was born in Chicago to an African American father and White American mother. He played basketball, soccer, baseball, American football and golf throughout his youth. His father, Kevin, played basketball professionally in Europe and South America. His brother, Andre, played American football professionally in the National Football League.

== College basketball ==
Holmes played college basketball for Mississippi Valley State and Morehead State from 2009 to 2013. He gained a bachelor's degree in universal studies upon graduation. While in his senior year, Holmes was invited to participate in the Australian Football League's 2013 US Draft Combine. He was subsequently signed as an international rookie by the St Kilda Football Club in October 2013.

== Australian football career ==
Holmes first played Australian rules football for St Kilda's developmental team, Sandringham, in the Victorian Football League (VFL). On August 22, 2015, he became the first born and raised American to debut in the AFL. Holmes lined up at the position of ruck and his debut included a game-high 34 hit outs in St Kilda's 97-all draw with Geelong. He played the final three games of the home and away season. While Holmes was dominant in ruck amassing an average of more than 25 hitouts a game, and had a relatively high tackle count, he took just one mark and had just 6 kicks in his 5 matches over two seasons with the Saints, having limited effectiveness around the ground. He was delisted at the conclusion of the 2017 season.

== Personal life ==
Holmes is one of five children. He has two brothers; his older brother, Andre Holmes, was a wide receiver in the National Football League His younger brother, Mark, plays European basketball for BC Winterthur. He also has two younger sisters.
