= Justin Green (cornerback) =

American football player (born 1991)

No. 41
- Position: Cornerback

Personal information
- Born: February 26, 1991 (age 35); Louisville, Kentucky, U.S.
- Listed height: 5 ft 11 in (1.80 m)
- Listed weight: 195 lb (88 kg)

Career information
- High school: Louisville Male
- College: Illinois
- NFL draft: 2013: undrafted

Career history
- New England Patriots (2013); Dallas Cowboys (2014)*; San Jose SaberCats (2014)*; New England Patriots (2014–2015)*; San Jose SaberCats (2016)*; Winnipeg Blue Bombers (2016)*
- * Offseason or practice squad member only

Awards and highlights
- Super Bowl champion (XLIX)
- Stats at Pro Football Reference

Justin Green (born February 26, 1991) is an American former professional football player who was a cornerback for the New England Patriots of the National Football League (NFL). He was signed by the New England Patriots as an undrafted free agent in 2013. He played college football for the Illinois Fighting Illini.

== Professional career ==
=== New England Patriots ===
Green signed with the New England Patriots on July 21, 2013. He was waived on August 31 for final roster cuts, but signed to the practice squad the following day. He was promoted to the active roster on November 23. He was waived again on November 26 then re-signed to their practice squad two days later. The Patriots promoted Green from the practice squad on December 28.

=== Dallas Cowboys ===
On August 12, 2014, Green was traded to the Dallas Cowboys for defensive end Ben Bass. Green was released on September 1, 2014.

=== San Jose SaberCats (first stint) ===
On November 19, 2014, Green was assigned to the San Jose SaberCats of the Arena Football League.

=== New England Patriots ===
On December 3, 2014, Green was re-signed to the New England Patriots practice squad. Green won Super Bowl XLIX with the Patriots after they defeated the defending champion Seattle Seahawks 28–24.

=== San Jose SaberCats (second stint) ===
Green returned to the SaberCats for the 2016 season, however he did not see any action.

=== Winnipeg Blue Bombers ===
On April 4, 2016, the Winnipeg Blue Bombers of the Canadian Football League announced the signing of Green. He was released on May 24, 2016.

He participated in The Spring League in 2017.

== Personal life ==
Green's older brother, Marcus, is a former defensive tackle who played collegiately for Ohio State and had a short stint in the NFL. In the summer of 2015, Green retired from football to focus on pursuing a career to help children in the community. However this was only temporary as he continued his pursuit of playing professional football the following year.
