= Ben Bass (American football) =

American football player (born 1989)

No. 79
- Position: Defensive end

Personal information
- Born: October 12, 1989 (age 37); Grapevine, Texas, U.S.
- Listed height: 6 ft 5 in (1.96 m)
- Listed weight: 293 lb (133 kg)

Career information
- High school: Plano West (Plano, Texas)
- College: Texas A&M
- NFL draft: 2012: undrafted

Career history
- Dallas Cowboys (2012–2013); New England Patriots (2014)*
- * Offseason or practice squad member only

Career NFL statistics
- Games played: 2
- Total tackles: 1
- Stats at Pro Football Reference

Benjamin Joseph Bass (born October 12, 1989) is an American former professional football player who was a defensive end in the National Football League (NFL) for the Dallas Cowboys and New England Patriots. He played college football for the Texas A&M Aggies.

== Early life ==
Bass attended Plano West Senior High School, where he earned All-state honors. He played college football at Texas A&M University. He redshirted in 2007, and was used on the defensive line and at tight end as a freshman. He missed the 2009 season due to academics. As a senior, he had 26 tackles, 2 sacks and a pass deflection. He only started three games during his college career, including two in his last season.

== Professional career ==
=== Dallas Cowboys ===
After not being selected in the 2012 NFL draft, he received a tryout invitation for rookie-minicamp where he performed well enough to be signed as an undrafted free agent. On September 1, he was released and later signed to the practice squad. On November 13, he was promoted to the active roster after the team placed Kenyon Coleman on the injured reserve list, due to a torn triceps injury he suffered against the Philadelphia Eagles. On December 1, he was placed on injured reserve list due to an ankle injury.

In 2013, with the Cowboys moving to a 4-3 defense and the Tyrone Crawford season-ending injury, there were high expectations for Bass to earn a bigger role, but he suffered a separated shoulder in practice and was placed on the injured reserve list on September 5.

In 2014, he suffered a hamstring injury that limited his practice time in training camp. On August 12, an injured Bass was traded to the New England Patriots in exchange for cornerback Justin Green.

=== New England Patriots ===
On August 26, he was cut by the New England Patriots and later signed to the practice squad on September 26. He was released on October 30.
