= Marcus Green (defensive tackle) =

American football player (born 1983)

No. 97
- Position: Defensive tackle

Personal information
- Born: September 27, 1983 (age 43); Louisville, Kentucky, U.S.
- Listed height: 6 ft 1 in (1.85 m)
- Listed weight: 305 lb (138 kg)

Career information
- College: Ohio State
- NFL draft: 2006: undrafted

Career history
- New York Giants (2006)*; Seattle Seahawks (2006); New Orleans Saints (2007)*
- * Offseason or practice squad member only

Awards and highlights
- BCS national champion (2002)
- Stats at Pro Football Reference

Marcus Green (born September 27, 1983) is an American former professional football player who was a defensive tackle for the Seattle Seahawks of the National Football League (NFL). He played college football for the Ohio State Buckeyes and was signed by the New York Giants as an undrafted free agent in 2006.

== Personal ==
Green's younger brother, Justin, is a cornerback for the Dallas Cowboys that played collegiately for Illinois.
