= Kevin Ogletree =

American football player (born 1987)

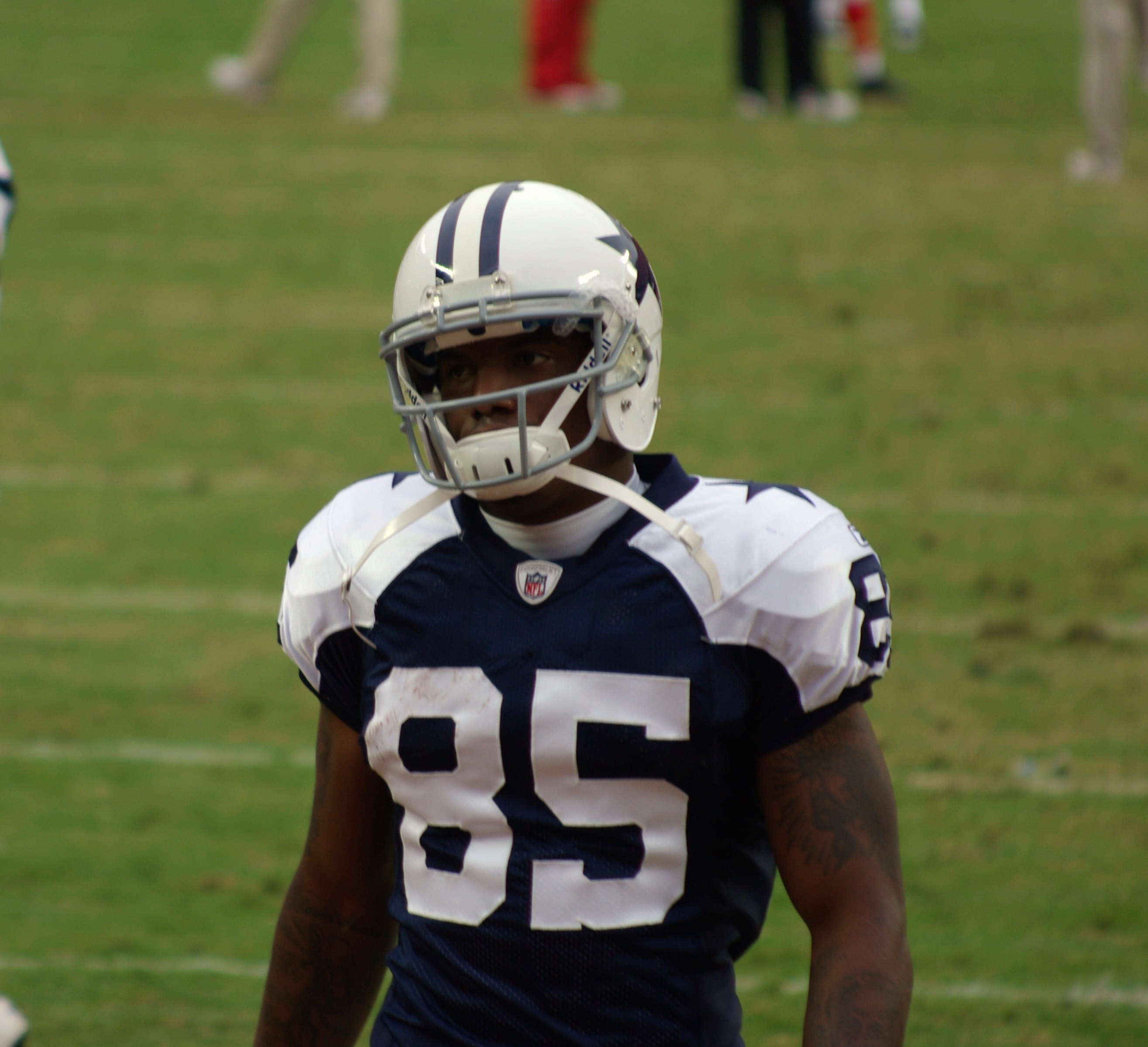
- Ogletree with the Dallas Cowboys in 2009

No. 11, 15, 85
- Position: Wide receiver

Personal information
- Born: August 5, 1987 (age 39); Queens, New York, U.S.
- Listed height: 6 ft 1 in (1.85 m)
- Listed weight: 190 lb (86 kg)

Career information
- High school: Holy Cross (Queens)
- College: Virginia (2005–2008)
- NFL draft: 2009: undrafted

Career history
- Dallas Cowboys (2009–2012); Tampa Bay Buccaneers (2013); Detroit Lions (2013–2014); New York Giants (2014)

Career NFL statistics
- Receptions: 83
- Receiving yards: 1,049
- Receiving touchdowns: 6
- Stats at Pro Football Reference

Kevin Ogletree (born August 5, 1987) is an American former professional football player who was a wide receiver in the National Football League (NFL) for the Dallas Cowboys, Tampa Bay Buccaneers, Detroit Lions and New York Giants. He played college football for the Virginia Cavaliers and signed with the Cowboys as an undrafted free agent in 2009.

== Early life ==
Ogletree was born in Flushing, New York, and attended Holy Cross High School. As a junior, he had 40 receptions for 1,027 yards and 10 touchdowns, while earning All-conference honors.

As a senior, he set league records with 61 catches for 1,170 yards and 19 touchdowns (one shy of the state record). He also played safety and had 5 interceptions. He contributed to the team winning a conference championship, while earning Player of the Year honors by Newsday and the New York Daily News.

He lettered in basketball and baseball. He was an Honor Roll student.

== College career ==
Ogletree accepted a football scholarship from the University of Virginia. As a true freshman, he appeared in 7 games as a backup wide receiver, making 7 receptions for 27 yards.

As a sophomore, he appeared in all 12 games, starting 9 of the final 10 contests. He led the team with 52 receptions for 582 receiving yards and 4 touchdowns. His best game came against the University of Maryland, when he registered 133 yards on 3 receptions.

In 2007, he missed his junior season with a torn anterior cruciate ligament injury in his left knee, that he suffered during spring drills.

Ogletree returned in 2008 as a redshirt junior, starting all 12 games, while leading the team with 58 receptions for 723 yards and 5 touchdowns. He declared for the 2009 NFL draft at the end of the season.

He left school as one of only 26 players in the Atlantic Coast Conference history with two-50 receptions seasons in a career. At the time, he ranked seventh in school history with 117 career receptions and 13th with 1,332 receiving yards.

== Professional career ==
Pre-draft measurables
Height	Weight	40-yard dash	10-yard split	20-yard split	20-yard shuttle	Three-cone drill	Vertical jump	Broad jump
6 ft 1 in (1.85 m)	196 lb (89 kg)	4.36 s	1.50 s	2.51 s	4.08 s	6.67 s	36 in (0.91 m)	10 ft 2 in (3.10 m)
All values from NFL Combine

=== Dallas Cowboys ===
Ogletree was signed by the Dallas Cowboys as an undrafted free agent after the 2009 NFL draft. On September 6, he was rewarded with a spot on the 53-man roster over seventh round draft choice Manuel Johnson. He registered 7 receptions for 96 yards as a backup wide receiver. He was second on the team with eight kickoff returns for 166 yards.

In 2010, he was declared inactive for most of the season, until he had a chance to play more with starter Dez Bryant out for the season with a fractured ankle. Ogletree injured his right big toe and was placed on the injured reserve list on December 15. He appeared in 6 games, posting 3 receptions for 34 yards.

In 2011, he appeared in 14 games, making 15 receptions for 164 yards and 6 kickoff returns for 114 yards. He had his first career start in place of an injured Bryant (thigh), making 2 receptions for 50 yards in the 27–24 overtime win against the San Francisco 49ers.

In 2012, he earned the third-receiver position and finished the season opener against the New York Giants with career highs in receptions (8), receiving yards (114) and touchdowns (2). He ended up being passed on the depth chart by second-year player Dwayne Harris. He finished with 32 receptions for 436 yards and 4 touchdowns. He wasn't re-signed at the end of the season.

=== Tampa Bay Buccaneers ===
On March 13, 2013, Ogletree signed as a free agent with the Tampa Bay Buccaneers. On October 1, he was released after four games, at the time, he was third on the team with 8 receptions for 70 yards and one touchdown.

=== Detroit Lions ===
On October 2, 2013, he signed with the Detroit Lions following an injury to the Lions' Nate Burleson. According to Ogletree, "Who doesn't want to go play with Calvin Johnson and Matthew Stafford and Reggie Bush? It's a perfect opportunity."

In 2014, he recorded 13 receptions for 199 yards and one touchdown. The touchdown came from a one handed catch during the Thanksgiving game against the Green Bay Packers. On September 20, he was released to make room for cornerback Mohammed Seisay.

=== New York Giants ===
On October 14, 2014, Ogletree was signed by the New York Giants to replace an injured Victor Cruz. He was waived on May 7, 2015.
