= Rob Callaway =

American football player (born 1988)

No. 61, 72
- Position: Defensive tackle

Personal information
- Born: February 14, 1988 (age 38); Mt. Morris, Michigan, U.S.
- Listed height: 6 ft 5 in (1.96 m)
- Listed weight: 324 lb (147 kg)

Career information
- High school: Beecher (MI)
- College: Saginaw Valley State
- NFL draft: 2010: undrafted

Career history
- Detroit Lions (2010–2011)*; Dallas Cowboys (2011–2012)
- * Offseason or practice squad member only

Awards and highlights
- Honorable-mention All-GLIAC (2009)
- Stats at Pro Football Reference

Robert Callaway (born February 14, 1988) is an American former professional football player who was a defensive tackle in the National Football League (NFL) for the Detroit Lions and Dallas Cowboys. He played college football for the Saginaw Valley State Cardinals.

== Early life ==
Callaway attended Beecher High School, where he played offensive tackle, defensive tackle and defensive end. He also practiced track.

He accepted a football scholarship from Division-II Saginaw Valley State University. As a freshman, he played in the last five games of the season, making four starts at defensive tackle and five stops.

As a sophomore, he appeared in five games with one start, making two tackles (0.5 for loss). As a junior, he appeared in ten games as a backup defensive tackle, tallying 11 tackles.

As a senior, he started all 12 games, registering 25 tackles (six for loss), 3.5 sacks and three blocked kicks.

== Professional career ==
=== Detroit Lions ===
Callaway was signed as an undrafted free agent by the Detroit Lions after the 2010 NFL draft on April 30. On August 7, he was waived and signed to the practice squad two days later.

In 2011, despite posting a sack and a forced fumble in the preseason, he was released by the Lions due to their pre-existing depth at the position on September 3.

=== Dallas Cowboys ===
On September 8, 2011, he was signed to the Dallas Cowboys practice squad. He was cut on October 28. He was re-signed on November 1. He was released one day later and re-signed on November 8.

On January 2, 2012, he was signed to a 3-year extension. He was released on September 1 and later signed to the practice squad. On December 8, he was promoted to the active roster. He appeared in 2 games and was declared inactive for the last 2 contests.

In 2013, he suffered a knee injury during organized team activities. He underwent career-ending microfracture surgery and was waived injured on July 11.
