= Tyrone Crawford =

Canadian football player (born 1989)

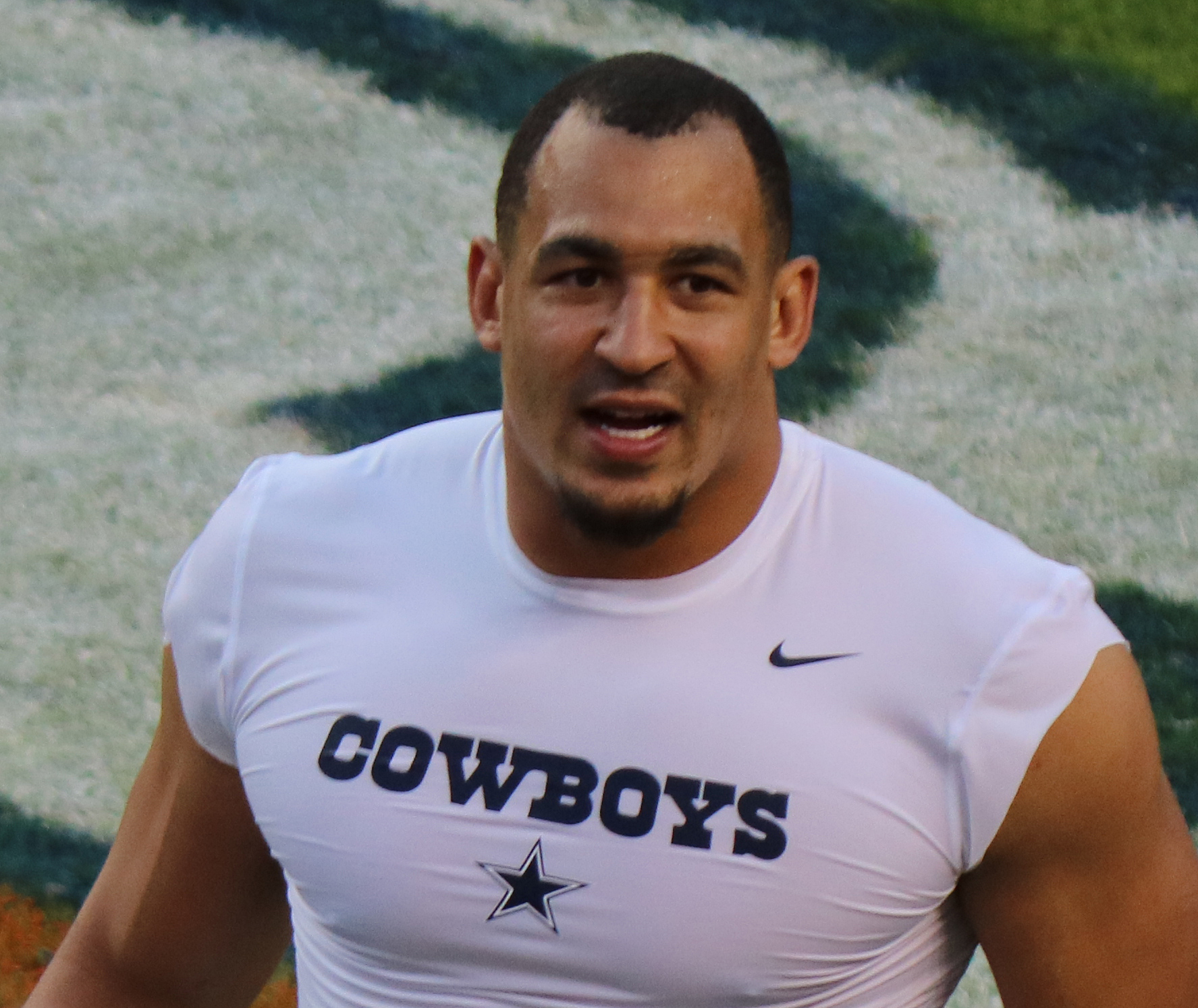
- Crawford in 2017

No. 70, 98
- Position: Defensive end

Personal information
- Born: November 22, 1989 (age 36); Windsor, Ontario, Canada
- Listed height: 6 ft 4 in (1.93 m)
- Listed weight: 290 lb (132 kg)

Career information
- High school: Catholic Central (Windsor)
- College: Bakersfield (2008–2009); Boise State (2010–2011)
- NFL draft: 2012: 3rd round, 81st overall pick

Career history
- Dallas Cowboys (2012–2020)

Awards and highlights
- First-team All-MWC (2011)

Career NFL statistics
- Total tackles: 194
- Sacks: 25
- Forced fumbles: 3
- Fumble recoveries: 3
- Stats at Pro Football Reference

Tyrone Crawford (born November 22, 1989) is a Canadian former professional football player who was a defensive end for the Dallas Cowboys of the National Football League (NFL). He played college football for the Boise State Broncos before being selected in the third round of the 2012 NFL draft by the Cowboys.

== Early life ==
Crawford attended Catholic Central High School in Windsor, Ontario, where he was a three-sport athlete (football, basketball and track and field). In football, he played running back, outside linebacker and kick returner.

As a junior, he was named the conference's MVP and received the Royal Arcanum Outstanding Athlete Award. He was voted first team all-conference (Windsor & Essex County Secondary School Athletic Association) during every one of his four prep seasons.

He practiced track and field as a freshman and sophomore, winning gold medals both years in the shot put and discus in his conference and at the OFSAA championships. In basketball as a senior, he was named the MVP in his conference and received the Bill Rogin Award, for the best player in the Ontario secondary schools.

== College career ==
=== Bakersfield College ===
Crawford was recruited by Boise State University and Michigan State University, but the academic curriculum from his Canadian high school didn't meet NCAA requirements, so he enrolled at Bakersfield College in 2008. After concentrating on just playing football and the defensive end position, he appeared in 9 games and was named first-team All-conference as freshman in 2008, while collecting 38 tackles (13 for loss), 6 sacks, one pass breakup and one fumble recovery.

As a sophomore in 2009, he was honored as a junior college first-team All-American and was named to both first-team all-state and conference. He also was awarded as the defense's most valuable player for the Renegades. He registered 42 tackles (led the team), including 8 sacks and 14 tackles for loss.

Considered a four-star recruit by Rivals.com, Crawford was ranked as one of the most talented JUCO prospects in the nation. He committed to Boise State University.

=== Boise State University ===
In his first season at Boise State University, as a junior in 2010, Crawford appeared in each of the Broncos 13 games as a back-up weak-side defensive end. He registered 32 tackles on the season (13 solo), 13.5 tackles-for-loss (tied for the team lead), 7 sacks (second on the team), one forced fumble, one fumble recovery, one pass breakup and one blocked kick.

As a senior in 2011, Crawford started in 11 games, recording 44 tackles (20 solo), 6.5 sacks (led the team) and 13.5 tackles for loss (led the team). He was named first team All-Mountain West Conference for his performance.

== Professional career ==
Pre-draft measurables
Height	Weight	Arm length	Hand span	40-yard dash	10-yard split	20-yard split	20-yard shuttle	Three-cone drill	Vertical jump	Broad jump	Bench press
6 ft 4 1/4 in (1.94 m)	275 lb (125 kg)	33 3/4 in (0.86 m)	9 1/2 in (0.24 m)	4.78 s	1.69 s	2.80 s	4.44 s	7.09 s	33 in (0.84 m)	9 ft 5 in (2.87 m)	28 reps
All values from NFL Combine except 40-yd dash

Crawford was selected by the Dallas Cowboys in the third round (81st overall) of the 2012 NFL draft. On June 13, he signed a four-year deal receiving a $575,252 signing bonus. At the 2012 NFL Scouting Combine in February, he was diagnosed with a heart murmur. As a rookie, he played the left defensive end position in defensive coordinator Rob Ryan's 3–4 defense. He was a reserve player and finished with 33 tackles (18 solo) and 5 quarterback pressures.

In 2013, defensive coordinator Monte Kiffin was hired to change the defense to a 4-3 alignment and Crawford was expected to backup the strongside defensive end position and play both defensive tackle spots in passing situations. On July 21, 2013, he suffered a torn Achilles on the first full day of training camp and was placed on the injured reserve list.

Entering 2014, there were initial plans to evaluate Crawford in the 3-technique defensive tackle spot vacated by free agent Jason Hatcher, but after the signing of Henry Melton he was kept at defensive end. During the regular season Melton struggled as he recovered from offseason surgery and worked through a groin strain, so Crawford was forced to play defensive tackle in week 3 against the New Orleans Saints and would earn the starter job. He finished with three sacks and 29 quarterback pressures.

In 2015, Crawford was signed to a five-year, $45 million contract ($25.7 million guaranteed). He was limited with a torn rotator cuff in his right shoulder that required offseason surgery, suffered in the second game of the season against the Philadelphia Eagles. He still managed 44 tackles, 5 sacks (third on the team), and 27 quarterback pressures (third on the team).

In 2016, Crawford struggled at the beginning of the season playing defensive tackle. The production of Terrell McClain and rookie Maliek Collins, combined with the need the team had at defensive end, made the Cowboys decide to move him to left defensive end in the fourth quarter of the second game of the season against the Washington Redskins. He would remain the starter at left defensive end for the rest of the season. His best game came in week 8 against the Philadelphia Eagles, registering 5 quarterback hurries, 1.5 sacks, 2 tackles for loss and a fumble recovery. He posted 2 sacks against the Cleveland Browns. He had to be replaced against the Tampa Bay Buccaneers with David Irving, because he was playing through shoulder and hamstring injuries. He started 14 games did not play in the last 2 contests of the season, because he was being saved for the playoffs. He finished with 21 tackles (6 tackles for loss), 4.5 sacks (third on the team) and 17 quarterback pressures (second on the team).

In 2017, he suffered an ankle injury in training camp on August 8, that looked at the time to be a season ending injury. He missed most of the preseason. He was a backup during the first 2 games of the season, until being moved to right defensive end to help improve the rushing defense. In Week 8 against the Washington Redskins, he had 3 tackles, one quarterback pressure, one forced fumble and blocked a 36-yard field goal attempt, in which teammate Orlando Scandrick returned 90 yards in the 33–19, earning him NFC Special Teams Player of the Week. He started 14 out of 16 games, collecting 38 tackles (2 for loss), 4 sacks (third on the team), 26 quarterback hurries (second on the team), 2 pass breakups, one forced fumble, one recovery and one blocked field goal attempt.

In 2018, Crawford was switched back to defensive tackle after Maliek Collins and David Irving both started the league season with injuries or suspensions. He also started games at right defensive end and made his 200th career tackle in the eleventh game against the Washington Redskins. He was bothered by bursitis in his hips late in the season. He was declared inactive in the season finale with a neck injury. He started 15 games, posting 33 tackles, 5.5 sacks (third on the team) and 25 quarterback hurries.

In 2019, he missed the entire offseason conditioning program and training camp while recovering from his hip injury. He started the first 2 games of the season, before being held out in the next 2 outings. He returned to play as a backup in Week 5 and Week 6. On October 15, he was placed on injured reserve after undergoing season-ending hip surgery. He finished with 2 tackles (one for loss), one sack and one quarterback pressure.

On July 28, 2020, he was placed on the active/physically unable to perform list at the start of training camp, still recovering from his double hip surgery. He was activated on August 14. He was placed on the reserve/COVID-19 list by the team on November 11, and activated on November 18. He struggled with his physical health during the season, appearing in 16 games with 3 starts. He had 17 tackles (2 for loss), 2 sacks and 14 quarterback hurries.

Cowboys head coach Mike McCarthy announced Crawford's intention to retire from professional football on March 25, 2021.

== Career statistics ==
=== NFL ===
Year	Team	Games		Tackles					Interceptions						Fumbles	
Year	Team	GP	GS	Comb	Solo	Ast	Sack	Sfty	PD	Int	Yds	Avg	Lng	TD	FF	FR
2012	DAL	16	0	20	16	4	0.0	0	0	0	0	0.0	0	0	0	0
2013	DAL	0	0	Did not play due to injury												
2014	DAL	15	15	33	22	11	3.0	0	1	0	0	0.0	0	0	1	0
2015	DAL	16	16	35	23	12	5.0	0	1	0	0	0.0	0	0	0	0
2016	DAL	14	14	28	16	12	4.5	0	0	0	0	0.0	0	0	0	2
2017	DAL	16	14	27	18	9	4.0	0	2	0	0	0.0	0	0	1	1
2018	DAL	15	15	34	17	17	5.5	0	2	0	0	0.0	0	0	1	0
2019	DAL	4	2	3	1	2	1.0	0	0	0	0	0.0	0	0	0	0
2020	DAL	16	3	14	7	7	2.0	0	0	0	0	0.0	0	0	0	0
Total		112	79	194	120	74	25.0	0	6	0	0	0.0	0	0	3	3

=== College ===
			Defense				
Year	Team	GP	Tackles	For Loss	Sacks	FF	PD
2010	Boise St	13	32	13.5	7.0	1	1
2011	Boise St	12	44	13.5	6.5	3	0
Total		25	76	27.0	13.5	4	1
