= Kenyon Coleman =

American football player (born 1979)

No. 90, 93, 99
- Position: Defensive end

Personal information
- Born: April 10, 1979 (age 47); Fontana, California, U.S.
- Listed height: 6 ft 5 in (1.96 m)
- Listed weight: 293 lb (133 kg)

Career information
- High school: Alta Loma (Rancho Cucamonga, California)
- College: UCLA
- NFL draft: 2002: 5th round, 147th overall pick

Career history
- Oakland Raiders (2002); Dallas Cowboys (2003−2006); New York Jets (2007−2008); Cleveland Browns (2009−2010); Dallas Cowboys (2011−2012); New Orleans Saints (2013)

Awards and highlights
- Third-team All-American (2001); Morris Trophy (2001); First-team All-Pac-10 (2001); Second-team All-Pac-10 (1999)

Career NFL statistics
- Total tackles: 377
- Sacks: 13.5
- Forced fumbles: 3
- Fumble recoveries: 4
- Stats at Pro Football Reference

Kenyon Octavia Coleman (born April 10, 1979) is an American former professional football player who was a defensive end in the National Football League (NFL) for the Oakland Raiders, Dallas Cowboys, New York Jets, Cleveland Browns, and New Orleans Saints. He played college football for UCLA Bruins.

== Early life ==
Coleman was born in Fontana, California to Johnny and Patsy Coleman. He attended Alta Loma High School in Alta Loma, California, where he played football as an offensive and defensive lineman, while helping his teams win two CIF championships.

He earned All-State honors as a sophomore, but his junior season was cut short after he fractured his left leg. As a senior, he was named to the PrepStar All-American team. He also played three years of varsity basketball.

== College career ==
Coleman accepted a football scholarship from the University of California, Los Angeles, where he majored in philosophy. During his college career, he had 138 tackles and 16.5 sacks. He earned All-Pac-10 honorable-mention honors as a true sophomore and second-team All-Pac-10 as a junior.

In 2000 as a senior, he suffered torn meniscus cartilage in his left knee, playing against Michigan University in the third game of the season. Coleman was granted a medical redshirt, coming back in 2001 as a fifth-year senior to earn third-team All-American, All-Pac-10 and winning the Morris Trophy as the conference's top lineman.

== Professional career ==
=== Oakland Raiders ===
Coleman was selected by the Oakland Raiders in the fifth round (147th overall) of the 2002 NFL draft. He made his NFL debut against the Buffalo Bills in week 5. As a rookie, he was declared inactive in 15 regular season games and all three playoff contests.

At the start of his second season, the emergence of other young defensive ends made him expendable in the eyes of Raiders management. He was traded to the Dallas Cowboys on August 31, 2003, in exchange for a 2004 7th round draft choice (#223-Jacques Reeves) and a 2005 6th round pick (#185-Chad Owens).

=== Dallas Cowboys (first stint) ===
In 2003, he was a backup defensive end for the Dallas Cowboys, registering 15 tackles (one for loss), one sack, three quarterback pressures, one fumble recovery and one pass defensed. The next year, he made 10 tackles, one sack and two quarterback pressures. In 2005, he started five of the 12 games he appeared in, posting 17 tackles (one for loss), a half sack and one quarterback pressure.

In 2006, he registered 32 tackles (one for loss), four sacks, one quarterback pressure, four passes defensed and a forced fumble. He spent four seasons with the Cowboys as a reserve, recording 68 tackles and 6.5 sacks. He played in a 4–3 defense in his first two years, before the Cowboys switched to a 3–4 defense in 2005.

=== New York Jets ===
On March 6, 2007 he was signed by the New York Jets as an unrestricted free agent, becoming a starter and leading all NFL defensive ends in tackles with 90. The next year, he made 64 tackles, a half sack and two passes defensed.

On April 25, 2009, he was traded to the Cleveland Browns along with Brett Ratliff, Abram Elam, a first round pick (#17-Josh Freeman) and a second round pick (#52-David Veikune), as part of a trade to acquire the fifth overall pick in the 2009 NFL draft to select Mark Sanchez.

=== Cleveland Browns ===
In Cleveland, he was reunited with former New York Jets head coach Eric Mangini and played as the Browns left defensive end starter. He registered 38 tackles, 1.5 sacks and two passes defensed. The next year, he recorded 68 tackles, 2.5 sacks and three fumble recoveries. He was released on February 9, 2011.

=== Dallas Cowboys (second stint) ===
On July 30, 2011, after losing Stephen Bowen in free agency and hiring his former Browns defensive coordinator Rob Ryan, the Cowboys signed him as a free agent to a two-year contract worth $3.75 million. During his second stint with the Cowboys, he was named the starter at left defensive end, and his physical size and strength was used to improve the team's run defense, starting 15-of-16 games, while making 44 tackles (tenth on the team), one sack, five tackles for loss (fifth on the team), two passes defensed and four quarterback pressures.

In 2012, his season ended early with a torn triceps in his left arm (suffered against the Philadelphia Eagles) that required season-ending surgery, he finished with five starts (missed two games with a knee injury), 22 tackles, two quarterback pressures and one forced fumble.

=== New Orleans Saints ===
On April 1, 2013, Coleman signed a one-year deal with the New Orleans Saints, reuniting him once again with the former Dallas Cowboys' defensive coordinator Rob Ryan. On August 7, the team announced that he had suffered a torn pectoral muscle and would miss the entire 2013 season. On August 19, he was placed on the injured reserve list. He announced his retirement on February 21, 2014.

== NFL career statistics ==
Legend
**Bold**	Career high

=== Regular season ===
Year	Team	Games		Tackles					Interceptions					Fumbles			
Year	Team	GP	GS	Cmb	Solo	Ast	Sck	TFL	Int	Yds	TD	Lng	PD	FF	FR	Yds	TD
2002	OAK	1	0	1	1	0	0.0	0	0	0	0	0	0	0	0	0	0
2003	DAL	**16**	0	19	12	7	1.0	**4**	0	0	0	0	0	0	1	0	0
2004	DAL	12	0	15	13	2	1.0	3	0	0	0	0	0	0	0	0	0
2005	DAL	12	5	17	11	6	0.5	0	0	0	0	0	0	0	0	0	0
2006	DAL	**16**	0	31	26	5	**4.0**	**4**	0	0	0	0	2	**1**	0	0	0
2007	NYJ	**16**	14	**82**	**55**	**27**	1.5	3	0	0	0	0	0	0	0	0	0
2008	NYJ	**16**	**15**	55	44	11	0.5	1	0	0	0	0	1	**1**	0	0	0
2009	CLE	13	13	38	28	10	1.5	**4**	0	0	0	0	2	0	0	0	0
2010	CLE	**16**	14	68	50	18	2.5	3	0	0	0	0	0	0	**3**	0	0
2011	DAL	**16**	**15**	36	23	13	1.0	**4**	0	0	0	0	**3**	0	0	0	0
2012	DAL	7	5	15	12	3	0.0	0	0	0	0	0	0	**1**	0	0	0
		141	81	377	275	102	13.5	26	0	0	0	0	8	3	4	0	0

=== Playoffs ===
Year	Team	Games		Tackles					Interceptions					Fumbles			
Year	Team	GP	GS	Cmb	Solo	Ast	Sck	TFL	Int	Yds	TD	Lng	PD	FF	FR	Yds	TD
2006	DAL	**1**	0	**4**	**4**	0	0.0	0	0	0	0	0	0	0	0	0	0
		1	0	4	4	0	0.0	0	0	0	0	0	0	0	0	0	0
