= Danny Coale =

American football player (born 1988)

No. 81
- Position: Wide receiver

Personal information
- Born: June 27, 1988 (age 38); Lexington, Virginia, U.S.
- Listed height: 6 ft 0 in (1.83 m)
- Listed weight: 187 lb (85 kg)

Career information
- High school: Alexandria (VA) Episcopal
- College: Virginia Tech
- NFL draft: 2012: 5th round, 152nd overall pick

Career history
- Dallas Cowboys (2012–2013)*; Indianapolis Colts (2013)*; Pittsburgh Steelers (2014)*
- * Offseason or practice squad member only
- Stats at Pro Football Reference

Daniel Kinsman Coale (June 27, 1988) is an American former football wide receiver. He played college football at Virginia Tech.

== Early life ==
Coale was a versatile player for head coach Mark Gowin at Episcopal High School. He played wide receiver and defensive back, returned punts and kickoffs, and handled the place-kicking and punting duties.

As a junior, he registered 27 catches for 780 yards, 14 touchdowns and 4 interceptions, including one returned for a touchdowns

As a senior, he posted 27 receptions for 564 yards and 9 touchdowns, including two kickoff returns. He was a second-team All-Met pick by The Washington Post, was listed as the No. 17 overall player on the Virginia 33 by SuperPrep, No. 21 player in the state of Virginia by The Roanoke Times and was a member of the SuperPrep Mid-Atlantic Team. He also earned first-team all-state honors as a lacrosse player.

He finished his prep career with 109 catches for 2,367 yards and 33 touchdowns, earning All-State honors in three-straight seasons, including first-team honors in his last two years.

== College career ==
Coale accepted a football scholarship from Virginia Tech. As a redshirt freshman he started 14 games, collecting 36 receptions (led the team) for 408 receiving yards (second on the team).

As a sophomore, he started in 12 out of 13 games, making 30 receptions for 614 yards and 2 touchdowns. Against Nebraska, his 81-yard reception in the final 90 seconds of the game set up the winning touchdown.

As a junior he started every game, recording 39 receptions (second on the team), 732 receiving yards (second on the team), an 18.8-yard average (led the team) and 3 touchdowns. He tallied a career-high 143 receiving yards in the ACC title game against Florida State University, along with 6 receptions and a 46-yard catch.

As a senior he started every game, registering 60 receptions for 904 yards, 4 carries for 26 yards, and 3 receiving touchdowns. He returned 8 punts for 52 yards (6.5-yard average). He also filled-in as the team's punter in 4 games, making 13 punts for a 43.5-yard average, including 4 punts over 50+ yards (a long of 61 yards), 3 punts down inside the opponents 20-yard line and one touchback. He was the first Hokie to earn the ACC's James Tatum Award, for the conference's top senior football student-athlete. Against Boston College, he had a career-high 8 receptions for 118 yards. Against Georgia Tech, he was named ACC Receiver of the Week after making a 63-yard touchdown pass for a game-high 97 yards.

In the 2012 Sugar Bowl he was involved in a controversial call in overtime with the score tied at 20, when he made a diving catch that was initially ruled a touchdown, but would later be overruled after a lengthy video review. The Hokies would miss the following field goal attempt, allowing the University of Michigan to hit a 37-yard field goal on the following drive to give them a 23-20 win.

Coale finished his college career with 165 receptions (second in school history), 2,658 receiving yards (second in school history), a 16.1-yard average and 8 receiving touchdowns. He graduated with a degree in Finance, Insurance and Business Law during the fall of 2010.

== Professional career ==
=== Dallas Cowboys ===
Coale was selected by the Dallas Cowboys in the fifth round (152nd overall) of the 2012 NFL draft. On June 11, 2012, he signed a four-year contract with Dallas, receiving a base salary of $390,000.

Coale suffered a broken toe in a conditioning drill, which forced him to miss organized team activities and weeks of training camp. He was released on August 30 and re-signed to the practice squad on September 1. Coale season was cut short when he suffered a torn ACL on November 15, and was placed on the injured reserve list.

The next season, Coale experienced swelling in his repaired left knee, which set him back in training camp. He was waived on August 30, 2013, before being re-signed to the team's practice squad. On September 16, Coale was waived by Dallas in order to clear roster space for Jamar Newsome.

=== Indianapolis Colts ===
Coale was signed to the Indianapolis Colts' practice squad on September 18, 2013, but was released on September 25, to make room for Da'Rick Rogers.

=== Pittsburgh Steelers ===
Coale was signed to a reserve/future contract by the Pittsburgh Steelers on January 28, 2014. After suffering a displaced finger fracture, he was waived with an injury designation on August 5 to make room for James Shaw. On January 1, 2015, Coale was re-signed to the team's practice squad.

== Personal life ==
Coale is the son of Jimmy Coale, professor of physical education and head strength and conditioning coach at Virginia Military Institute and his wife, Kathy. He is one of three boys, with two brothers, Kevin, a former University of Virginia lacrosse player, and Ryan, a baseball player. He is the son-in-law of former NFL offensive tackle Tunch Ilkin.
