= Matt Johnson (safety) =

American football player (born 1989)

No. 37
- Position: Safety

Personal information
- Born: July 22, 1989 (age 37); Olympia, Washington, U.S.
- Listed height: 6 ft 1 in (1.85 m)
- Listed weight: 212 lb (96 kg)

Career information
- High school: Tumwater (WA)
- College: Eastern Washington
- NFL draft: 2012: 4th round, 135th overall pick

Career history
- Dallas Cowboys (2012–2013)

Awards and highlights
- FCS national champion (2010); 2× All-Big Sky (2010, 2011)
- Stats at Pro Football Reference

Matt Johnson (born July 22, 1989) is an American former professional football safety in the National Football League (NFL) for the Dallas Cowboys. He played college football at Eastern Washington University.

== Early life ==
Johnson attended Tumwater High School, where he practiced football, basketball and baseball. He received All-league honors three years in a row in football.

As a senior, he collected 53 tackles, two interceptions and one fumble recovery while helping his team reach the Class 2A state semifinals. He was named second-team 2A All-Evergreen League, after missing five games because of a high ankle sprain. He also helped his school reach the 2A District IV basketball tournament and win the District IV baseball championship.

== College career ==
Johnson accepted a football scholarship from Eastern Washington University. As a redshirt freshman, he posted 11 starts, 83 tackles (second on the team), five tackles for loss and four interceptions. He made 10 tackles against Texas Tech University. He had two interceptions against Western Washington University. He made 12 tackles against the University of Northern Colorado.

As a sophomore, he tallied 101 tackles and six interceptions, the latter leading the conference. He had 16 tackles against Weber State University. He had four interceptions against Portland State University, tying a single-game conference record. He had 14 tackles against the University of Montana and Montana State University.

As a junior, he helped the team win the NCAA Division I FCS National Championship, while registering 105 tackles (third on the team), five interceptions, eight passes defended, two forced fumbles and one fumble recovery. He also contributed to the defense being ranked number one nationally with 26 interceptions and 47 turnovers forced. He had two interceptions against the University of Montana. He was named a team co-captain along with his twin brother Zach.

As a senior, he missed the final four games with an injured shoulder, recording 52 tackles (fourth on the team), eight tackles for loss (led the team), two interceptions, 1.5 sacks, one quarterback hurry, two forced fumbles and earned All-Big Sky conference honors for the second straight season. He had four tackles (two for loss) and one sack against the University of Washington. He injured his shoulder against the University of South Dakota, but still managed to intercept one pass and then had back-to-back games with nine tackles /against the University of Montana and Montana State University, while fighting through the injury.

He finished with 45 starts, 341 tackles (fifth in school history and eighth in the Big Sky Conference), 22 tackles for loss, 30 passes defended, 17 interceptions (tied for the most in school history) and six forced fumbles (the most in school history).

== Professional career ==
Pre-draft measurables
Height	Weight	40-yard dash	20-yard shuttle	Three-cone drill	Vertical jump	Broad jump	Bench press
6 ft 1 in (1.85 m)	212 lb (96 kg)	4.52 s	4.07 s	7.01 s	38 in (0.97 m)	10 ft 1 in (3.07 m)	18 reps
All values from Eastern Washington pro day

Johnson was selected by the Dallas Cowboys in the fourth round (135th overall) of the 2012 NFL draft, which at the time was seen as a reach by the media. As a rookie, he was ineligible to participate in organized team activities until Eastern Washington's classes ended. After experiencing recurring hamstring issues during preseason, the team still kept him on the active roster, but after not being able to recover and play in any games during the regular season, he was placed on the injured reserve list on November 17, 2012.

Coming into 2013, there were high expectations that he could earn the starting free safety position, but he was placed on the injured reserve list on August 31, 2013, with a sprained left foot that he suffered in the Pro Football Hall of Fame Game.

After battling hamstring issues during the previous years, on July 29, 2014, he suffered a hamstring injury in training camp that kept him out of the preseason. On August 27, he was waived injured and was placed on the injured reserve list, before being released with an injury settlement on September 3.

He announced his retirement on February 27, 2015.

== Personal life ==
Johnson played alongside his twin brother Zach Johnson in high school and college.
