= Deaths in January 1989 =

The following is a list of notable deaths in January 1989.

Entries for each day are listed alphabetically by surname. A typical entry lists information in the following sequence:

- Name, age, country of citizenship at birth, subsequent country of citizenship (if applicable), reason for notability, cause of death (if known), and reference.

== January 1989 ==
=== 1 ===
- Charles Cornell, 77, American Communist (Socialist Workers Party).
- Percy MacKenzie, 70, English cricketer and RAF officer.
- Joseph Petre, 17th Baron Petre, 74, English peer.
- G. Sankara Pillai, 58, Indian playwright, literary critic and director.
- Anthony Pini, 86, Argentinian-Scottish cellist (London Philharmonic Orchestra).
- George Ross, 87, Australian rules footballer.
- Mal Rush, 79, American basketball player.
- Irvin Shapiro, 82, American producer, film importer and film distributor, complications from Parkinson's disease.
- Aleka Stratigou, 62, Greek actress

=== 2 ===
- Fred Berry, 78, English cricketer.
- René Courvoisier, 81, Swiss Olympic field hockey player (1936).
- Safdar Hashmi, 34, Indian playwright and director, and communist activist, murdered.
- Murdo Martin, 71, Canadian politician, member of the House of Commons of Canada (1957–1968).

=== 3 ===
- Robert Banks, 67, American chemist (Phillips Petroleum, Perkin Medal).
- Betty Behrens, 84, British historian and academic (University of Cambridge).
- Jean-Paul Denis, 64, Canadian NHL player (New York Rangers).
- Errol Le Cain, 47, British animator and children's book illustrator (Hiawatha's Childhood – Kate Greenaway Medal).
- Laurence Grafftey-Smith, 96, British diplomat, member of the British Consular Service.
- Eddie Heywood, 73, American jazz pianist and composer (Soft Summer Breeze, Canadian Sunset).
- Bernhard Krüger, 84, Nazi German SS Sturmbannführer.
- Jim Lawson, 86, American NFL player (New York Yankees).
- Lina Prokofiev, 91, Spanish singer
- Sergei Sobolev, 80, Soviet mathematician.
- Robert Thomas, 61, French writer, actor and film director.
- Nick Virgilio, 60, American haiku poet, heart attack.
- Jean Willes, 65, American film and television actress (The King and Four Queens, Invasion of the Body Snatchers), liver cancer.

=== 4 ===
- Srikrishna Alanahalli, 41, Indian novelist and poet (Kaadu, Parasangada Gendethimma).
- Ratanlal Brahmin, 88, Indian politician, Member of Parliament.
- Pino Calvi, 58, Italian pianist, conductor and composer (Accarezzame).
- Junko Furuta, 17, Japanese student, murdered.
- Erling Juul, 91, Norwegian Olympic triple jumper (1920).
- Clare Leighton, 91, English–American artist, writer and illustrator, known for wood engravings.
- Mike Micka, 67, American NFL player (Washington Redskins, Boston Yanks).
- D. R. Nanayakkara, 73, Sri Lankan cinema actor (Rekava, Indiana Jones and the Temple of Doom).
- Dvora Netzer, 91, Israeli politician, member of the Knesset (1949–1969).
- Robert Watson Pomeroy, 86, American businessman and politician, member of the New York Senate, heart failure.
- Ross Sutherland, 51, Australian rules footballer.
- Naomi Chapman Woodroof, 88, American agriculturalist, known for increasing peanut yields five-fold.

=== 5 ===
- Philip Herschkowitz, 82, Romanian-born composer and music theorist.
- Dexter Masters, 79, American editor and novelist (One World or None: a Report to the Public on the Full Meaning of the Atomic Bomb).
- Nell O'Day, 79, American equestrian and actress, heart attack.
- David Stewart Porter, 79, American district judge (United States District Court for the Southern District of Ohio).

=== 6 ===
- Eduardo Balderas, 81, Mexican-born American translator for the Church of Jesus Christ of Latter-day Saints.
- Hans von Campenhausen, 85, Baltic German Protestant theologian.
- Mario Galento, 73, American actor and professional wrestler.
- Jim Hurtubise, 56, American race car driver, winner of 1966 Atlanta 500, heart attack.
- Illingworth "Buck" Kerr, 83, Canadian painter, known for landscape paintings of Saskatchewan and Alberta prairies and foothills, suicide.
- Elizabeth Duncan Koontz, 69, American figure in civil rights and women's movement, director of the United States Women's Bureau, heart attack.
- Sir Edmund Leach, 78, British social anthropologist, president of the Royal Anthropological Institute.
- Elisa Lispector, 77, Brazilian novelist (Além da Fronteira, O Muro de Pedras).
- George Mercer, 44, American rapist and murderer, executed.
- John Donald Robb, 96, American composer and arts administrator.
- Kehar Singh, 53–54, Indian co-conspirator in the Indira Gandhi assassination, executed.
- Satwant Singh, 26–27, Indian co-assassin of Indira Gandhi, executed.

=== 7 ===
- Frank Adams, 58, British mathematician, Professor of Astronomy and Geometry at Cambridge (Adams spectral sequence, Adams conjecture).
- Nigel Bloy, 66, English cricketer and RAF officer.
- Tom Brierley, 78, British-Canadian cricketer.
- Alfred Dieck, 82, German archaeologist whose work has been largely discredited.
- Hirohito, 87, longest reigning Emperor of Japan (since 1926), cancer.
- Zoltán Jeney, 78, Hungarian Olympic ice hockey player (1936).
- Josef Moll, 80, Nazi German Wehrmacht and West German Bundeswehr officer, Inspector of the Army.
- Desmond Morris, 28, Jamaican Olympic high jumper (1980, 1984).
- Aslam Pahalwan, 61, Pakistani professional wrestler and world heavyweight champion.
- Timothy Plowman, 44, American ethnobotanist, known for study of Erythroxylum, AIDS contracted from inoculations.
- Stuart Rhodes, 78, English cricketer (Nottinghamshire County Cricket Club).

=== 8 ===
- Mieczysław G. Bekker, 83–84, Polish American vehicular engineer, contributed to design and construction of the Lunar Roving Vehicle.
- Ronald DiPerna, 41, American mathematician in nonlinear partial differential equations.
- Torsten Johansson, 83, Swedish Olympic footballer (1936).
- Johnny Jordaan, 64, Dutch singer of levenslied.
- Junker Jørgensen, 42, Danish Olympic cyclist (1972).
- Olavi Kuronen, 65, Finnish Olympic ski jumper (1952).
- Kenneth McMillan, 56, American actor (Rhoda, Dune), liver disease.
- Bill Reynolds, 60, American Negro Leagues baseball player.
- Frank Sullivan, 90, Canadian Olympic ice hockey player (1928).

=== 9 ===
- Bill Andrews, 80, English cricketer.
- Richard Barr, 71, American theatre director and producer, president of the League of American Theatres and Producers, AIDS-related liver failure.
- Biguá, 67, Brazilian footballer.
- Stan Callaghan, 72, Australian rugby league footballer.
- Øivind Jensen, 83, Norwegian Olympic boxer (1924).
- Walter Köhler, 91, German Nazi Party politician, Minister President of Baden.
- Marshall H. Stone, 85, American mathematician at Harvard (Stone–von Neumann uniqueness theorem), stroke.
- Bill Terry, 90, American Major League baseball player (New York Giants).
- John K. Waters, 82, American general in the U.S. Army, heart failure.

=== 10 ===
- Chris Avram, 57, Romanian-Italian film actor
- William Joseph Browne, 91, Canadian lawyer, judge and politician, member of the House of Commons of Canada (1949–1953, 1957–1962).
- John Powers Crowley, 52, American district judge (United States District Court for the Northern District of Illinois).
- Calvin DeWitt Jr., 94, American brigadier general.
- Yi Eungro, 84, Korean-born French painter and printmaker, heart attack.
- Kai Fjell, 81, Norwegian painter.
- Karl Geiringer, 89, Austrian-American musicologist and biographer of composers, complications from a fall.
- Valentin Glushko, 80, Soviet engineer, program manager of the Soviet space program.
- Royal Little, 92, American founder and chair of Textron.
- Herbert Morrison, 83, American radio journalist, voice of the Hindenburg disaster.
- Peder Puck, 96, Norwegian footballer.
- Donald Voorhees, 85, American conductor and composer.
- Colin Winchester, 55, assistant commissioner in the Australian Federal Police, assassinated.

=== 11 ===
- Sir George Abell, 84, English civil servant and cricketer, director of the Bank of England.
- Adil Candemir, 71–72, Turkish Olympic wrestler (1948).
- Hai Deng, 86, Chinese Buddhist monk and martial artist, emeritus abbot of Shaolin Temple.
- Michael Forrestal, 61, American National Security Advisor of President John F. Kennedy, aneurysm.
- August Koern, 88, Estonian statesman and diplomat.
- Ray Moore, 47, British broadcaster, host of early morning show on BBC Radio 2, throat cancer.
- José Bustamante y Rivero, 94, Peruvian politician and diplomat, President of Peru.
- Jackie Wright, 84, Northern Irish comedian, bald-headed sidekick of Benny Hill.

=== 12 ===
- Clise Dudley, 85, American MLB player (Brooklyn Robins, Philadelphia Phillies, Pittsburgh Pirates).
- Harold Hubble, 84, English cricketer.
- Irena Milnikiel, 55, Polish Olympic swimmer (1952).
- Ray Morehart, 89, American Major League baseball player (Chicago White Sox, New York Yankees).
- Fernand Oriol, 88, French Olympic rower (1924).
- Percy Price Jr., 52, American amateur boxer and Olympian (1960).
- Nikos Psacharopoulos, 60, Greek-American theatre producer and director, co-founder of Williamstown Theater Festival, colon cancer.
- Satyam, 55–56, Indian composer.
- Willy Schneider, 83, German schlager singer.

=== 13 ===
- Pat Ankenman, 76, American MLB player (St. Louis Cardinals, Brooklyn Dodgers).
- Hermann Bartels, 88, Nazi German architect and member of the SS.
- Sterling Allen Brown, 87, American professor and poet, Poet Laureate of the District of Columbia, leukemia.
- Thelma Cazalet-Keir, 89, British feminist and politician, Member of Parliament.
- Candy Csencsits, 33, American professional female bodybuilder and actress, breast cancer.
- Molly Flaherty, 74, Australian cricketer.
- Joe Glamp, 67, American NFL player (Pittsburgh Steelers).
- Chuck Hornbostel, 77, American Olympic middle-distance runner (1932, 1936).
- Hiram E. McCallum, 89, Canadian politician, Mayor of Toronto.
- John Moorman, 83, English Bishop of Ripon.
- Ray Morehart, 89, American baseball player (Chicago White Sox, New York Yankees).
- José María Peña, 93, Spanish international footballer and manager, Olympian (1924).
- Joe Spinell, 52, American actor (The Godfather, Rocky, Taxi Driver)

=== 14 ===
- Ernie Blake, 75, German-American co-founder of Taos Ski Valley, New Mexico, pneumonia.
- Robert Lekachman, 68, American economist, promoter of social justice, liver cancer.
- Robert Lembke, 75, German television presenter and game show host (Was bin ich? – What's my Line)
- Ramesh Prasad Mohapatra, 49, Indian archaeologist, curator for archaeology at Odisha State Museum.
- Sylvia Meagher, 67, World Health Organization analyst who devoted the last decades of her life to researching and writing about the JFK assassination.
- Odette Monard, 85, French Olympic swimmer (1924).
- Jim Money, 81, Australian rules footballer.
- Marco Vassi, 51, American author, noted for erotica, pneumonia.
- Richard Warner, 77, English actor (George and Margaret, When We Are Married)
- Nguyễn Văn Xuân, 96, Vietnamese politician, prime minister of Vietnam.

=== 15 ===
- Wendy Foster, 51, British architect, co-founder of Team 4 and Foster Associates, cancer.
- Helen Logan, 82, American screenwriter.
- Ibrahim Shihab, 65, Maldivian writer and politician.
- Wilf Slack, 34, English international cricketer (English national team, Middlesex), heart attack.
- Trevor Swan, 71, Australian economist (Solow–Swan growth model).

=== 16 ===
- Mick Baxter, 32, English footballer (Preston North End, Middlesbrough, Portsmouth), cancer.
- Pierre Boileau, 82, half of French crime-writing duo Boileau-Narcejac (Les Diaboliques, Vertigo).
- Joseph Henry Lynch, 77, British artist (Tina, Autumn Leaves, Woodland Goddess).
- Fredrik Meyer, 72, Norwegian Olympic sailor (1936).
- Prem Nazir, 62, Indian actor (Vida Parayum Munpe, Iruttinte Athmavu), measles.
- Steve Otto, 67, Canadian politician, member of the House of Commons of Canada (1962–1972).
- Frank Trechock, 73, American MLB player (Washington Senators).
- George Ray Tweed, 86, American radioman in the U.S. Navy, known for evading capture for more than two years, car accident.
- Trey Wilson, 40, American actor (Raising Arizona, Bull Durham), cerebral hemorrhage.

=== 17 ===
- Gordon Allott, 82, American politician (Republican), U.S. Senator (1955–1973).
- Brian Allsop, 53, Australian rugby league footballer.
- Wajid Ali Khan Burki, 88, Pakistani ophthalmologist, lung cancer.
- Michael Francke, 42, American judge, director of New Mexico and Oregon Corrections Departments, murdered.
- Jim Lansford, 58, American NFL player (Dallas Texans).
- Sam Longson, 88, British businessman, chairman of Derby County Football Club.
- Óscar Vargas Prieto, 71, Peruvian soldier and politician, Prime Minister of Peru.
- Georges Schéhadé, 83, Lebanese playwright and poet (Histoire de Vasco).
- Alfred Smith, 80, Australian cricketer.
- Anton Weselak, 70, Canadian lawyer and politician, member of the House of Commons of Canada (1953–1957).
- Alfredo Zitarrosa, 52, Uruguayan singer-songwriter and poet (Doña Soledad, Crece desde el Pie, Recordándote).

=== 18 ===
- Nils Axelsson, 83, Swedish footballer.
- Bruce Chatwin, 48, British travel writer and novelist (On the Black Hill, Utz), AIDS.
- Buster Clarkson, 73, American Major League and Negro League baseball player (Boston Braves).
- Marshall Esteppe, 79, American professional wrestler.
- Ormond Graham, 70, Barbadian cricketer.
- John D. Hickerson, 90, American diplomat, United States Ambassador to the Philippines and Finland, cancer.
- Al Lindow, 69, American NFL player (Chicago Cardinals).
- Jim Odom, 67, American MLB umpire.
- Bienna Pélégry, 89, French Olympic swimmer (1924, 1928).
- Irving Resnick, 72, American mobster, boxing promoter and manager, heart failure.

=== 19 ===
- Devi Dja, 74, Indonesian-American dancer, actress and singer (Dardanella theatre company), cancer.
- Luis Guzmán, 70, Peruvian footballer.
- Viva Tattersall, 90, British stage and film actress (The Whispering Shadow).
- Norma Varden, 90, English-American actress (Casablanca, The White Cliffs of Dover, The Sound of Music), heart failure.
- Octavio Vial, 70, Mexican international football manager and World Cup coach.

=== 20 ===
- Mete Adanır, 27, Turkish Cypriot footballer (Altay, Samsunspor), team bus accident.
- Józef Cyrankiewicz, 77, Polish communist politician, prime minister and president of Poland.
- John Harding, 92, British Army Field Marshall, Governor of Cyprus.
- Alamgir Kabir, 50, Bangladeshi film director and cultural activist, drowned.
- Dolf van Kol, 86, Dutch Olympic footballer (1928).
- Beatrice Lillie, 94, Canadian-British actress, singer and comedic performer (Inside U.S.A., High Spirits).
- Ron McCarthy, 54, Australian rules footballer.
- Whistlin' Alex Moore, 89, American blues pianist and singer ("Blue Bloomer Blues", "Black Eyed Peas and Hog Jowls"), heart attack.
- Wenzel Profant, 75, Luxembourgian sculptor.
- Vincenzo Rossello, 65, Italian cyclist.
- Morris Starsky, 55, American political and social activist, philosophy professor (Arizona State University), heart disease.
- Halsey Stevens, 80, American music professor, biographer and composer.

=== 21 ===
- Muharrem Bajraktari, 92, Albanian Muslim guerrilla fighter (National Committee for a Free Albania).
- William O. Burch, 84, American rear admiral in the U.S. Navy.
- José de Chávarri, 91, Spanish Olympic field hockey player (1928).
- Morley Drury, 85, Canadian-American footballer (University of Southern California).
- Keith English, 61, Canadian CFL player (Montreal Alouettes).
- Carl Furillo, 66, American Major League baseball player (Brooklyn & Los Angeles Dodgers), heart attack.
- Leslie Halliwell, 59, British film critic (Filmgoer's Companion, Halliwell's Film Guide), esophageal cancer.
- Mahmoud Namjoo, 70, Iranian Olympic weightlifter (1948, 1952, 1956).
- Gulabrao Patil, 67, Indian politician, Member of Parliament.
- Robert H. Pierson, 78, American president of the General Conference of Seventh-day Adventists.
- Billy Tipton, (Dorothy Lucille Tipton), 74, American transgender jazz musician and bandleader, peptic ulcer.

=== 22 ===
- Miodrag Andrić, 45, Serbian actor.
- James Francis Collins, 83, American general in the U.S. Army, prostate cancer.
- Sydney Goldstein, 85, British mathematician (Fluid dynamics).
- Joseph Mattsson-Boze, 83, Swedish-American minister, pastor of Chicago's Philadelphia Church.
- Ugo Pignotti, 90, Italian fencer and Olympic gold medalist (1928, 1932).
- S. Vithiananthan, 64, Sri Lankan writer, vice-chancellor of the University of Jaffna.
- Larry Warke, 61, Irish cricketer.
- Willie Wells, 82, American Negro League baseball player, congestive heart failure.
- Sándor Weöres, 75, Hungarian poet and author.

=== 23 ===
- George Case, 73, American Major League baseball player (Washington Senators), emphysema.
- Nguyễn Minh Châu, 58, Vietnamese novelist.
- Salvador Dalí, 84, Spanish artist (Cabaret Scene, The Basket of Bread, The First Days of Spring), cardiac arrest.
- Albert Geary, 88, English cricketer.
- Bob Gerhardt, 85, American insurance businessman, broker, and Olympic rower (1924).
- M. Govindan, 69, Indian writer and cultural activist (Nokkukuthi).
- Lindsay Grant, 89, Trinidadian cricket umpire, cricket administrator, and businessman.
- Robert Kelly, 75, American officer in the U.S. Navy, known for evacuating General Douglas MacArthur from the Philippines, pneumonia.
- John Lyon-Dalberg-Acton, 81, Italian-born British peer and soldier, member of the House of Lords.
- Hans Karl Meyer, 90, Nazi German admiral in the Kriegsmarine and flotilla admiral of the West German navy.
- Angus Morrison, 86, English pianist, Order of the British Empire.
- Diana Pizzavini, 77, Italian Olympic gymnast (1928).
- Frits Schipper, 84, Dutch Olympic footballer (1928).
- Lars-Erik Torph, 28, Swedish rally driver, rally crash as a spectator.
- Gilbert L. Voss, 70–71, American conservationist and oceanographer (Woods Hole Oceanographic Institute).

=== 24 ===
- Betty Belton, 72, English cricketer.
- Ted Bundy, 42, American serial killer, executed.
- Mike Bytzura, 66, American basketball player.
- Dante Emiliozzi, 73, Argentine racing driver.
- Matelo Ferret, 70–71, French guitarist and composer, cancer.
- Roberto Figueroa, 84, Uruguayan international footballer and Olympic gold medalist (1928).
- Merwin Graham, 85, American Olympic triple jumper (1924).
- Earl Jones, 69, American MLB player (St. Louis Browns).
- George Knudson, 51, Canadian professional golfer, cancer.
- Sasha Putrya, 11, Ukrainian artist, leukemia.
- Michael Scott, 83, Irish architect (Busáras building, Cork Opera House, Abbey Theatre).
- Les Spann, 56, American jazz guitarist and flautist.
- Chauncey Stillman, 81, American philanthropist, art collector, conservationist and banking heir.
- Theodore B. Werner, 96, American politician, member of the United States House of Representatives (1933–1937).
- Siegfried Wischnewski, 66, German stage and film actor (Derrick, Der Kommissar)

=== 25 ===
- David Basnett, 64, British trade union leader, president of the Trades Union Congress.
- Bertil Berg, 78, Swedish Olympic water polo player (1936).
- Falih Fahmi, 48–49, Iraqi Olympic sprinter (1960), and general.
- Carlisle H. Humelsine, 73, American diplomat and military officer, Assistant Secretary of State for Administration.
- Gustavo Álvarez Martínez, 51, Honduran military officer, head of the Honduran armed forces, assassinated.
- László Márton, 65, Hungarian Olympic rower (1952).
- Alvin Robinson, 51, American rhythm and blues singer, guitarist and songwriter (Something You Got).
- Bikki Sunazawa, 57, Japanese woodcarver, painter, artist and sculptor, bone marrow cancer.
- Dave Underwood, 60, English footballer.

=== 26 ===
- Morton DaCosta, 74, American theatre and film director and producer, writer and actor (Plain and Fancy, Auntie Mame, The Music Man), heart failure.
- Donnie Elbert, 52, American soul singer and songwriter (Where Did Our Love Go, I Can't Help Myself), stroke.
- William Forrest, 86, American theatre, film and television actor, heart failure.
- Albert Hofstadter, 78, American philosopher.
- H. Claude Hudson, 102, American businessman and civil rights advocate, founder of Broadway Federal Savings and Loan Association.
- Segundo Llorente, 82, Spanish Jesuit missionary, philosopher and author.
- George Schroth, 89, American Olympic water polo player (1924, 1928).
- Aileen Thomas, 81, Canadian Olympic fencer (1936).

=== 27 ===
- Dónall Mac Amhlaigh, 62, Irish writer (Dialann Deoraí, Deoraithe).
- Abu Baker Asvat, 46, South African medical doctor, murdered.
- David Buck, 52, English actor and voice actor (Horatio Hornblower, The Lord of the Rings)
- Bayani Casimiro, 70, Filipino dancer.
- Bob Haymes, 65, American singer, songwriter, actor and radio and television presenter (That's All), amyotrophic lateral sclerosis.
- Robert A. Henle, 65–66, American electrical engineer (semiconductors).
- Marcel de Kerviler, 78, French navy officer and Olympic sailor (1948, 1952).
- Vasily Konovalenko, 59, Soviet artist (gemstone sculptures), cerebral hemorrhage.
- Willibald Kreß, 82, German international footballer and manager (Dresdner SC).
- Gerald Livock, 91, British RAF officer and cricketer.
- Arthur Marshall, 78, British writer, raconteur and broadcaster (Call My Bluff).
- Harry Moore, 61, Australian rules footballer.
- Sir Thomas Sopwith, 101, British aviation pioneer and yachtsman, European ice hockey champion.

=== 28 ===
- Michael Behrens, 77, British financier, banker, stockbroker, and restaurant and gallery owner, co-owner of the Ionian Bank.
- Eugene Emond, 68, American officer of the Federal Reserve Bank of New York.
- Choekyi Gyaltsen, Panchen Lama, 50, Tibetan Buddhist leader, heart attack.
- Svend Knudsen, 93, Danish footballer.
- Halina Konopacka, 88, Polish discus thrower and Olympic gold medalist (1928).
- László Papp, 84, Hungarian Olympic wrestler (1928).
- Stan Partenheimer, 66, American MLB player (Boston Red Sox, St. Louis Cardinals).
- Olli Puhakka, 72, Finnish Air Force ace in World War II.
- Paulette le Raer, 57, French Olympic gymnast (1960).
- Luigi Rovati, 84, Italian Olympic boxer (1932).
- Hasmukh Dhirajlal Sankalia, 80, Indian scholar and archaeologist.
- Marc Stevens, 45, American erotic performer, AIDS.
- Yoshimaro Yamashina, 88, Japanese ornithologist.

=== 29 ===
- Federico Cantú Garza, 81, Mexican painter, engraver and sculptor.
- Honey Green, 73, American Negro Leagues baseball player.
- Mandel Kramer, 72, American actor and voice actor (Yours Truly, Johnny Dollar).

=== 30 ===
- Alfonso, Duke of Anjou and Cádiz, 52, heir of the Spanish monarchy in the event of restoration, skiing accident.
- Pegeen Fitzgerald, 84, American radio personality (The Fitzgeralds), breast cancer.
- Jack George, 60, American NBA basketballer (Philadelphia Warriors, New York Knicks).
- Timothy Sylvester Hogan, 79, American district judge (United States District Court for the Southern District of Ohio).
- Friedrich Solmsen, 84, German-American philologist and professor of classical studies.

=== 31 ===
- Yasushi Akutagawa, 63, Japanese composer and conductor.
- Osborne Anderson, 80, American Olympic ice hockey player (1932).
- Audrey Beecham, 73, English poet and historian, asthma.
- Jack Douglas, 80, American comedy writer.
- Bob Dunn, 80, American cartoonist, entertainer and gagwriter.
- Arthur Reginald Evans, 83, Australian coastwatcher, rescuer of JFK.
- Fernando Gonçalves Namora, 69, Portuguese writer and medical doctor (Retalhos da Vida de um Médico).
- William Stephenson, 92, Canadian soldier, fighter pilot, businessman and spymaster (British Security Co-ordination).

=== Unknown date ===
- Lewis Goram, 63, Scottish footballer (Bury F.C.).
- Leo Holzer, 86–87, Austrian-Czech firefighter and Holocaust survivor.
- Oliver Sipple, 47, American who prevented assassination attempt on U.S. President Gerald Ford.
- Violet Winspear, 60, British romance author, cancer.
