= Ângela Ribeiro =

Ângela Ribeiro may refer to:

- Ângela Mendonça Ribeiro, Brazilian diver
- Ângela Ribeiro (actress), Portuguese actress
