= Marksville, Louisiana =

- City
- City of Marksville
- Motto: Where Everybody is Somebody
- Location of Marksville in Avoyelles Parish, Louisiana.

- Location within Louisiana
- Coordinates: 31°07′46″N 92°03′51″W
- Country: United States
- State: Louisiana
- Parish: Avoyelles
- Founded: 1794

Government
  - Mayor: John Lemoine

Area
  - Total: 4.83 sq mi (12.50 km^{2})
  - Land: 4.81 sq mi (12.47 km^{2})
  - Water: 0.012 sq mi (0.03 km^{2})
- Elevation: 82 ft (25 m)

Population (2020)
  - Total: 5,065
  - Density: 1,052.3/sq mi (406.28/km^{2})
- Time zone: UTC-6 (CST)
  - Summer (DST): UTC-5 (CDT)
- ZIP code: 71351
- Area codes: 318/457
- FIPS code: 22-48750
- GNIS feature ID: 2405027
- Website: www.cityofmarksville.com

Marksville is a small city in and the parish seat of Avoyelles Parish, Louisiana, United States. As of the 2020 census, Marksville had a population of 5,065.

Louisiana's first land-based casino, Paragon Casino Resort, opened in Marksville in June 1994. It is operated by the federally recognized Tunica-Biloxi Indian Tribe, which has a reservation in the parish.

== History ==
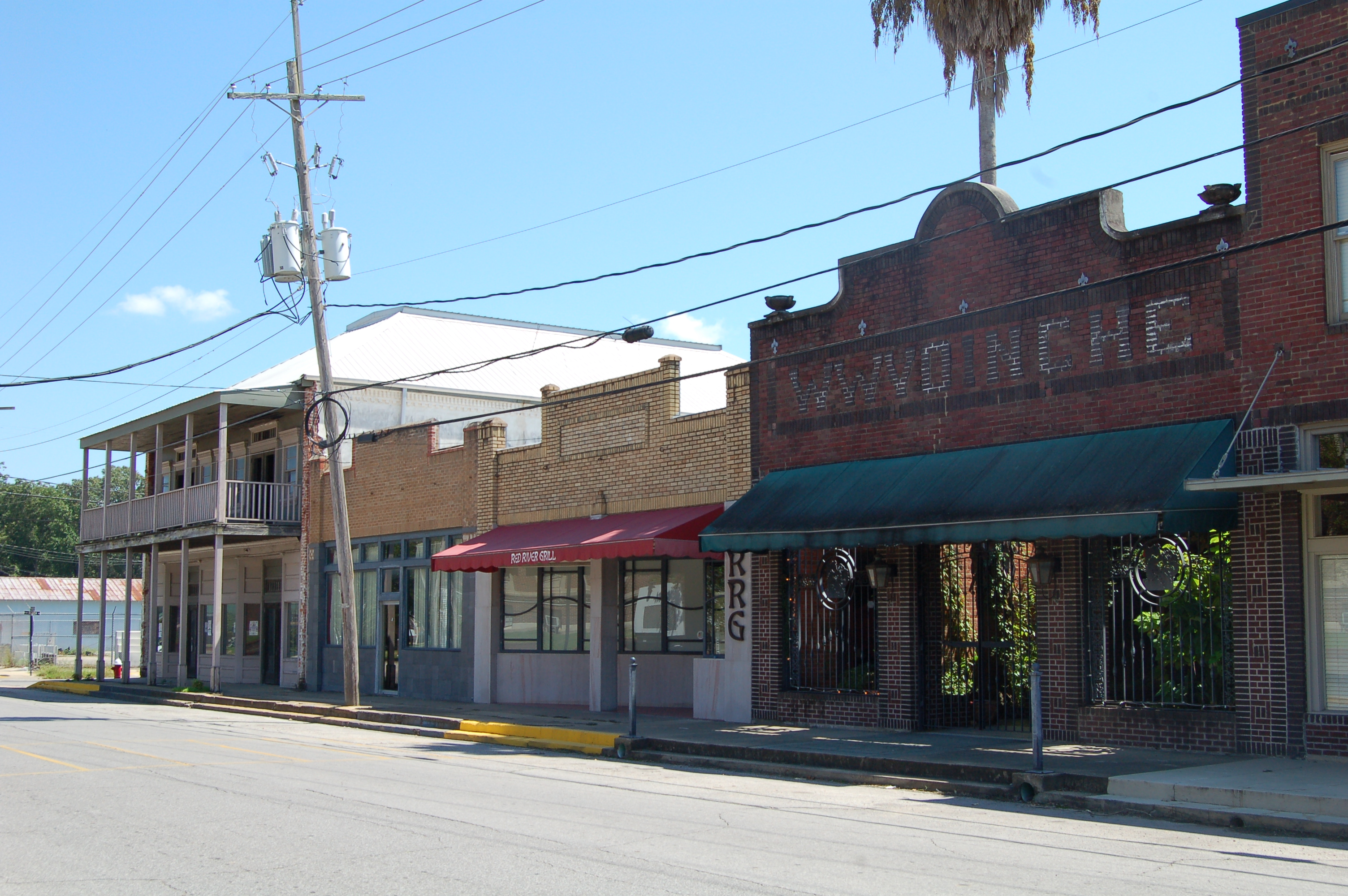
Marksville Commercial Historic District

The land where Marksville was founded on was once a meeting place, leading to the present day Marksville Prehistoric Indian Site.

Marksville is named after Marc Eliche (Marco Litche or Marco de Élitxe, as recorded by the Spanish), a Sephardic Jewish trader believed to be from Venice, who established a trading post after his wagon broke down in this area. His Italian name was recorded by a Spanish priest as Marco Litche; French priests, who were with colonists, recorded his name as Marc Eliche or Mark Eliché after his trading post was established about 1794. Marksville was noted on Louisiana maps as early as 1809, after the United States acquired the territory in the Louisiana Purchase of 1803. Eliche later donated the land that became the Courthouse Square in the center of Marksville.

Marksville's population has numerous families of Anglo Americans ancestry, in addition to African Americans, European Americans, and persons of mixed European-African ancestry. Many of the families had ancestors here since the city was incorporated.

Marksville became the trading center of a rural area developed as cotton plantations. After the United States outlawed the Atlantic slave trade in 1808, enslavers purchased African-American slaves through the domestic slave trade; a total of more than one million were transported to the Deep South from the Upper South in the first half of the 19th century. Enslavers typically bought slaves from markets in New Orleans, where they had been taken via the Mississippi River or by the coastal slave trade at sea. Solomon Northup, a free black man from Saratoga Springs, New York, was kidnapped and sold into slavery in Louisiana. After being held for nearly 12 years on plantations in Avoyelles Parish, he was freed in 1853 with the help of Marksville and New York officials. Northup's memoir, which he published after returning to New York, was the basis of the 2013 movie 12 Years A Slave, of the same name. On January 4, 2026 (the 173rd anniversary of his release from slavery), Hope Out of Darkness, a bronze statue of Northup created by American sculptor Wesley Wofford, will be unveiled in Marksville. Commissioned by the Solomon Northup Committee for Commemorative Works, the sculpture depicts Northup breaking free from chains with papers (his narrative) as a torch, symbolizing freedom and resilience.

=== 1947 Rain of Fish Incident ===
On October 23, 1947, between seven and eight o’clock in the morning, hundreds fish ranging from two to nine inches in length fell from the sky onto the streets and yards of Marksville. These were local freshwater fish, including: Large-mouth black bass (Micropterus salmoides), goggle-eye (Lepomis gulosus), several species of minnows, and hickory shad (Alosa mediocris).

=== 2015 shooting of Jeremy Mardis ===
On March 31, 2017, Judge William Bennett of the 12th Judicial District Court sentenced Stafford to forty years' imprisonment for the manslaughter of Jeremy Mardis. He was given a concurrent fifteen years for the attempted manslaughter of Christopher Few. Judge Bennett denied Stafford's defense request for a new trial. Stafford told the court that he did not know Jeremy was strapped in the front seat of the father's vehicle when he fired the fatal shots. Meanwhile, Greenhouse will be tried beginning June 12 on second-degree and attempted second-degree murder counts.

== Geography ==
According to the United States Census Bureau, the city has a total area of 4.1 square miles (11 km^{2}), of which 4.1 square miles (11 km^{2}) is land and 0.24% is water.

== Demographics ==
Historical population
| Census | Pop. | Note | %± |
|---|---|---|---|
| 1870 | 437 | | — |
| 1880 | 553 | | 26.5% |
| 1890 | 540 | | −2.4% |
| 1900 | 837 | | 55.0% |
| 1910 | 1,076 | | 28.6% |
| 1920 | 1,185 | | 10.1% |
| 1930 | 1,527 | | 28.9% |
| 1940 | 1,811 | | 18.6% |
| 1950 | 3,635 | | 100.7% |
| 1960 | 4,257 | | 17.1% |
| 1970 | 4,518 | | 6.1% |
| 1980 | 5,113 | | 13.2% |
| 1990 | 5,526 | | 8.1% |
| 2000 | 5,537 | | 0.2% |
| 2010 | 5,702 | | 3.0% |
| 2020 | 5,065 | | −11.2% |
| 2025 (est.) | 4,744 | ▼ | −6.3% |
U.S. Decennial Census

Marksville racial composition as of 2020
| Race | Number | Percentage |
|---|---|---|
| White (non-Hispanic) | 2,332 | 46.04% |
| Black or African American (non-Hispanic) | 2,208 | 43.59% |
| Native American | 78 | 1.54% |
| Asian | 14 | 0.28% |
| Other/Mixed | 352 | 6.95% |
| Hispanic or Latino | 81 | 1.6% |

As of the 2020 United States census, there were 5,065 people, 2,145 households, and 1,150 families residing in the city.

== Education ==
All primary public schools are run by the Avoyelles Parish School Board, which operates two schools within the city of Marksville. In January 2018, 5 children from Marksville died in a car accident while traveling through Gainesville, Florida.

=== Elementary ===
- Marksville Elementary

=== High school ===
- Marksville High School

== Media ==
=== Newspaper ===
- Avoyelles Journal

=== Radio ===
| Frequency | Callsign | Format | Owner |
|---|---|---|---|
| 92.1 | KLIL | Classic hit | Cajun Broadcasting |
| 95.9 | KZLG | Adult contemporary | Cajun Broadcasting |
| 97.7 | KAPB-FM | Classic country | Bontemps Media Services |

== Notable people ==
- Allen Barbre, a football player with the Denver Broncos.
- Earl Barbry, an American politician and Native American leader
- D'Anthony Batiste (born 1982), Former football player for various teams
- Aaron Broussard, Jefferson Parish politician
- Chester Coco (1915–2001), lawyer and Louisiana state senator
- Edwin Edwards, four-term Governor of Louisiana
- Elaine Schwartzenburg Edwards, US senator in 1972
- H. Claude Hudson, civil rights activist and founder of Broadway Federal Bank
- Jeannette Knoll, associate justice of the Louisiana Supreme Court since 1997
- Chad Lavalais, former LSU and NFL football player
- Tommy Neck, LSU and NFL football player from the 1960s
- Ed Oliver, NFL football player
- John H. Overton (1875–1948), U.S. senator, native of Marksville
- Horace Pierite, former chief of the Tunica-Biloxi tribe.
- Gaston Porterie, former Attorney General of the State of Louisiana
- Charles Addison Riddle III, District Attorney and former State Representative
- Little Walter Jacobs, blues musician, 2008 Rock and Roll Hall of Fame
- Chief Sesostrie Youchigant, former chief of the Tunica-Biloxi tribe.

== National Guard ==
1020th Engineer Company (Vertical) of the 527th Engineer Battalion of the 225th Engineer Brigade is located in Marksville.

== Small communities in the area ==
- Brouillette
- Fifth Ward
- Moncla
- Spring Bayou
- Tunica-Biloxi Indian Reservation
