= Isaiah Greenhouse =

American football player (born 1987)

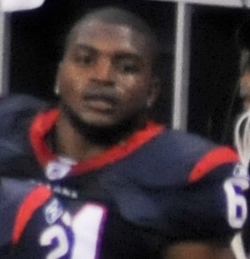

No. 58, 52, 48
- Position: Fullback / Linebacker

Personal information
- Born: July 15, 1987 (age 39); Marksville, Louisiana
- Listed height: 6 ft 2 in (1.88 m)
- Listed weight: 250 lb (113 kg)

Career information
- High school: Marksville (LA)
- College: Northwestern State
- NFL draft: 2010: undrafted

Career history
- Houston Texans (2010); Dallas Cowboys (2011–2012)*
- * Offseason or practice squad member only
- Stats at Pro Football Reference

Isaiah Greenhouse (born July 15, 1987) is an American former football linebacker and fullback. He was signed by the Houston Texans as an undrafted free agent in 2010. He played college football at Northwestern State.

== Professional career ==
=== Houston Texans ===
After going undrafted in the 2010 NFL draft, Greenhouse was signed by the Houston Texans on May 18, 2010. They tried him at fullback, but moved him back to linebacker later. He was cut on September 3, 2010, and signed to the practice squad two days later. He was called up from the practice squad on October 3, 2010, but was waived on October 10, after being on the roster for one week. He was re-signed to the practice squad on November 3, 2010. Greenhouse was promoted on December 29, 2010. He was re-signed on January 5, 2011. The Texans released him on February 18, 2011.

=== Dallas Cowboys ===
Greenhouse was signed by the Dallas Cowboys on March 1, 2011.

On August 16, 2011, he was moved to fullback. He was waived on September 3, 2011, and was signed to the practice squad the next day. He was waived/injured on August 23, 2012.
