= Ângela Ribeiro (actress) =

Portuguese actress (1940–2025)

- Born: 20 February 1940; Castelo Branco, Portugal
- Died: 10 January 2025 (aged 84); Lisbon
- Occupations: Film, television and theatre performer

Ângela Ribeiro (20 February 1940 – 10 January 2025) was a Portuguese actress. She worked in the theatre and on film, television and radio.

== Early life ==
Ribeiro was born in the town of Castelo Branco in the centre of Portugal on 20 February 1940. From the age of 17, she trained as an actress at the National Theatre Conservatory (Conservatório Nacional de Lisboa), making her professional debut in 1961 at the Teatro da Trindade in Lisbon, performing in Ghosts by Henrik Ibsen. In the same year she also acted for the first time on television, in 3200 Metres of Altitude, an adaptation of a play by the French playwright, Julien Luchaire.

== Career ==
Ribeiro's career spanned more than 50 years. She worked with various theatre companies in Lisbon, including the D. Maria II National Theatre, Teatro Moderno and Casa da Comédia companies, performing in plays by classic and contemporary authors. She also appeared in variety shows or revues, known as "magazine shows" in Portugal, which were usually performed in the Parque Mayer theatre district of Lisbon. Most notable of these was Ó Zé Aperta o Cinto (Zé fasten your seatbelt), which was on stage in 1971 at the Teatro Maria Vitória.

Her films included Friday the 13th (1962), by the Spanish director and screenwriter, Pedro Lazaga, Retalhos da Vida de Um Médico (1962), directed by Jorge Brum do Canto, O Miúdo da Bica (1963) and Rapazes de Táxis (1965), two films directed by Constantino Esteves. The last film she participated in was 451 Forte in 2001, directed by João Mário Grilo, a production in which she acted alongside Sofia Alves, Rita Blanco and Adriano Luz.

Ribeiro appeared in over 50 television series, soap operas, and films including Nunca Digas Adeus (TVI, 2001), O Último Beijo (TVI, 2002), Inspetor Max (TVI, 2004–2006), Deixa-me Amar (TVI, 2007–2008) and A Família Mata (SIC, 2011–2012). Her career regained momentum from around 2000 as private TV companies such as TVI and SIC began to make original shows. Her last appearances were in 2012 in the series Velhos Amigos on RTP and A Família Mata.

== Death ==
At the end of her life, Ribeiro lived in the Casa do Artista in Lisbon, a retirement home for people who had worked in the theatre. She died on 10 January 2025, at the Hospital Pulido Valente in Lisbon.
