= Ross Sutherland =

Ross Sutherland may refer to:

- Ross Sutherland (footballer) (1937–1989), Australian rules footballer
- Ross Sutherland (politician), New Democratic Party political candidate in the 2004 Canadian General Election
- Ross Sutherland RFC, Scottish rugby union club
