= Tommy Neck =

American football player (1939–2017)

No. 48
- Position: Defensive back

Personal information
- Born: January 10, 1939; Marksville, Louisiana, U.S.
- Died: May 5, 2017 (aged 78); Monroe, Louisiana, U.S.
- Listed height: 5 ft 11 in (1.80 m)
- Listed weight: 190 lb (86 kg)

Career information
- High school: Marksville (LA)
- College: LSU
- NFL draft: 1962: 18th round, 245th overall pick
- AFL draft: 1962: 20th round, 158th overall pick

Career history
- Chicago Bears (1962–1963); Ottawa Rough Riders (1964)
- Stats at Pro Football Reference

Thomas Ulric Neck (January 10, 1939 – May 5, 2017) was an American professional football player. He played as a defensive back in the National Football League (NFL) for the Chicago Bears for one game, in 1962. He was selected by the Bears in the 18th round of the 1962 NFL draft and was also selected by the Boston Patriots of the American Football League (AFL) in the 20th round of the 1962 AFL draft. He attended Louisiana State University, where he played college football for the LSU Tigers football team. Neck was born in Marksville, Louisiana and attended Marksville High School. He died in 2017, aged 78.
