= Chester Coco =

Louisiana politician (1915–2001)

Member of the Louisiana Senate
- In office 1944–1952

Personal details
- Born: February 15, 1915 Alexandria, Louisiana, U.S.
- Died: October 1, 2001 (aged 86) Mansura, Louisiana
- Party: Democratic
- Education: Louisiana State University Law Center (JD)

Chester John Coco (February 15, 1915 – October 1, 2001) was an American politician, lawyer, and businessman. He served in the Louisiana State Senate.

== Biography ==
Coco was born on February 15, 1915, in Alexandria, Louisiana. He went to school in Marksville, Louisiana. Coco attended Louisiana State University, where he studied law. He passed the state bar in 1937.

He was a Louisiana State Senator from 1944 to 1952 as a member of the Democratic Party. In 1952, he campaigned for election as Louisiana Attorney General. Coco was a co-founder of the Avoyelles Broadcasting Company, serving Avoyelles Parish. He died on October 1, 2001, in a nursing home in Mansura, Louisiana.
