= Chad Lavalais =

American football player (born 1979)

No. 94
- Position: Defensive tackle

Personal information
- Born: April 15, 1979 (age 47); Marksville, Louisiana, U.S.
- Listed height: 6 ft 1 in (1.85 m)
- Listed weight: 293 lb (133 kg)

Career information
- High school: Marksville
- College: LSU
- NFL draft: 2004: 5th round, 142nd overall pick

Career history
- Atlanta Falcons (2004–2005); Carolina Panthers (2007)*
- * Offseason or practice squad member only

Awards and highlights
- BCS National Championship (2003); Consensus All-American (2003); SEC Defensive Player of the Year (2003); First-team All-SEC (2003); Second-team All-SEC (2002); National Defensive Player of the Year (2003)

Career NFL statistics
- Total tackles: 53
- Sacks: 2.5
- Fumble recoveries: 2
- Stats at Pro Football Reference

Chad Douglas Lavalais (born April 15, 1979) is an American former professional football player who was a defensive tackle for two seasons in the National Football League (NFL). He played college football for the LSU Tigers, earned consensus All-American honors, and was a member of a BCS National Championship team. Thereafter, he played professionally for the NFL's Atlanta Falcons.

== Early life ==
Lavalais was born in Marksville, Louisiana. He lettered in football and track at Marksville High School. He was a Class 3A all-state selection as a tight end in 1997, in addition to being selected as an all-district choice on offense and defense.

== College career ==
Lavalais accepted an athletic scholarship to attend Louisiana State University, where he played for coach Nick Saban & the LSU Tigers football team from 2000 to 2003. After originally signing with LSU in 1998, he spent two seasons working as a prison guard at a correctional facility near his hometown of Marksville while working to improve his ACT score to become eligible to play. He first played for the Tigers in 2000, and appeared in nine games as a freshman, recording 22 tackles and one quarterback sack. While at LSU, he majored in general studies.

Lavalais started in 41 of 47 games in which he appeared for LSU and registered 202 tackles, 12 sacks, 10 passes defensed, one fumble recovery, one interception and one blocked kick. He was a first-team All-Southeastern Conference (SEC) selection and a consensus first-team All-American after starting every game as a senior. He was also named National Defensive Player of the Year by The Sporting News. During his senior season, the Tigers won the SEC Championship and defeated the Oklahoma Sooners 21–14 in the Sugar Bowl to win the BCS National Championship.

== Professional career ==
=== Atlanta Falcons ===
Lavalais was selected as a fifth round (142nd pick overall) choice by the Atlanta Falcons in the 2004 NFL draft. He played in every game with five starts at defensive tackle and finished the season with 42 tackles, two fumble recoveries and one pass defensed. He also recorded the following game statistics:

- Posted three tackles apiece in a reserve role vs. Arizona (9/26) and at Carolina (10/3).
- Led all defensive linemen with six tackles vs. Detroit (10/10).
- Made first career start in place of Rod Coleman (shoulder) and posted three tackles.
- Tallied two tackles apiece at Denver (10/31) and vs. Tampa Bay (11/14).
- Registered three tackles apiece vs. New Orleans (11/28) and at Tampa Bay (12/5).
- Started Weeks 14–17 in place of Ed Jasper (wrist).
- Tallied three tackles vs. Oakland (12/12) and four tackles vs. Carolina (12/18).
- Posted a career-high seven tackles at New Orleans (12/26).
- Recorded three tackles at Seattle (1/2).
- Recorded one tackle in a reserve role vs. St. Louis in the NFC Divisional Playoff game vs. St. Louis (1/15/05).
- Tallied two tackles at Philadelphia (1/23/05) in the NFC Championship Game.

Lavalais started in all fourteen games of the 2005 season. He was credited with 33 tackles, 2.5 sacks and two passes defensed. He speared Philadelphia Eagles quarterback Donovan McNabb in the first game of the season, causing an injury to McNabb that caused physical problems for the remainder of the season and his life, eventually leading to a diagnosis of a sports hernia. Lavalais was fined $7500 by the NFL for the hit. The Falcons waived Lavalais on September 2, 2006, right before the 2006 NFL season. Lavalais reportedly worked out with the Cincinnati Bengals as well as the Minnesota Vikings but was not signed. As such he did not play a snap in 2006.

=== Carolina Panthers ===
On March 27, 2007, Lavalais signed a one-year contract with the Carolina Panthers. Lavalais was released by the Panthers on August 26, 2007, before the start of the 2007 NFL season. Lavailais did not return to the NFL.
