= Marksville Commercial Historic District =

Historic district in Louisiana, United States

- U.S. National Register of Historic Places
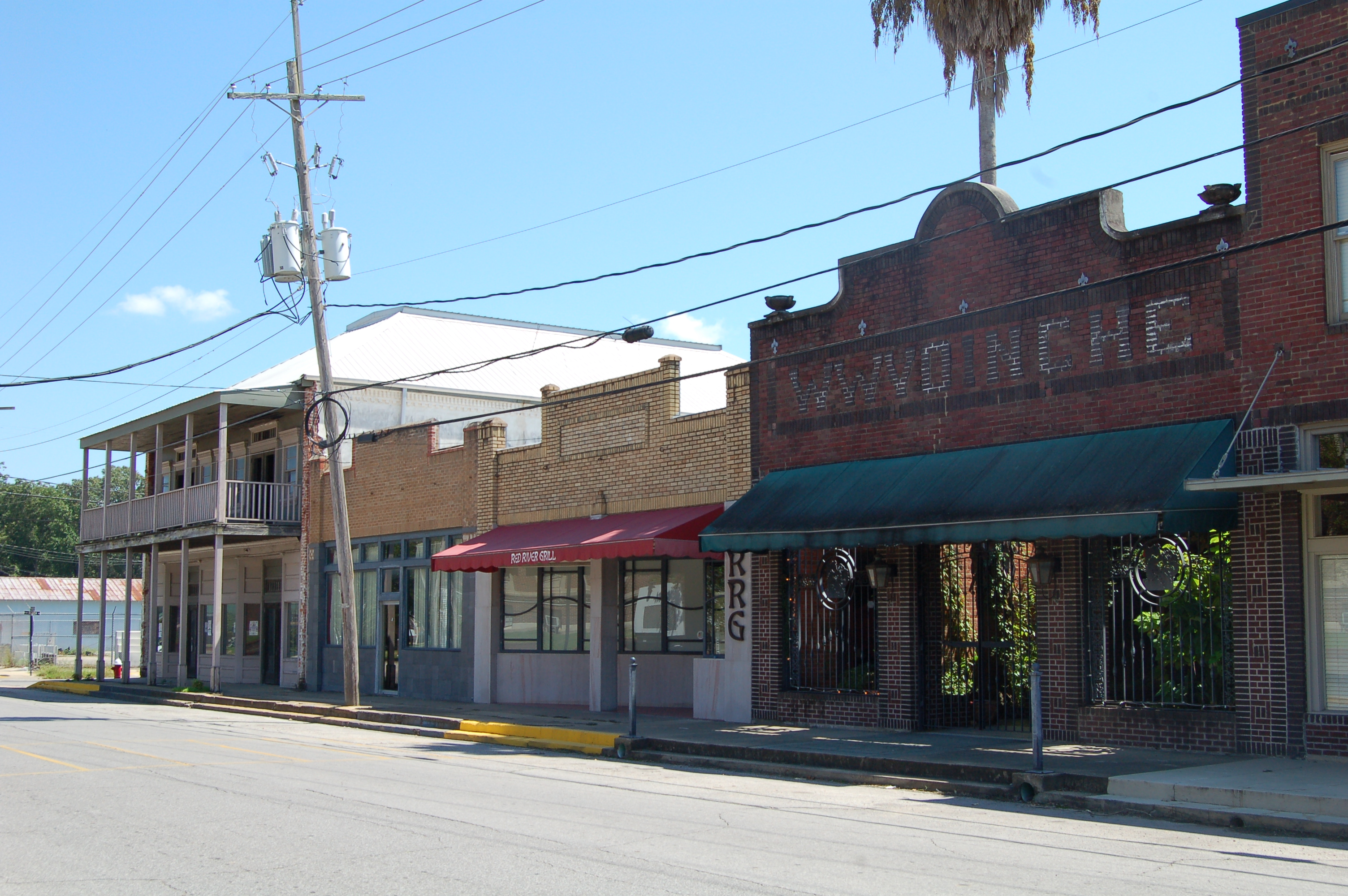
- From left to right, in 2016: Old Voinche Building, Old Piazza Store, Old Wilson Building, W.W. Voinche Building, part of Deshautlelle Building

- Location within Louisiana Location within the United States
- Location: Roughly bounded by Monroe St., Washington St., N. Ogden St., and Bontempt St., Marksville, Louisiana
- Coordinates: 31.12697°N 92.0665°W
- Area: 20 acres (8.1 ha)
- Built: 1890
- Built by: Multiple
- Architect: Multiple
- Architectural style: Beaux Arts, Federal
- NRHP reference No.: 83000489
- Added to NRHP: March 16, 1983

The Marksville Commercial Historic District is a 20 acres (8.1 ha) historic district in Marksville, Louisiana including a total of 48 contributing properties built between c. 1850 and 1933. It was listed on the National Register of Historic Places in 1983.

It includes Beaux Arts and Federal architecture.

Selected properties are:

- Avoyelles Parish Courthouse (1927), a four-story Classical Revival brick courthouse
- Laborde Barber Shop. Possible Law office of John Botts who owned the block before the Civil War. Old Woodman or World Hall (c.1890), Foot thick locally made brick walled. one-story brick gable-fronted building with gable end returns Building torn down in 2023 to expand law office next door.
- Wade Couvillion Law Office (c.1920), one-story frame, gable-fronted, galleried building. Burned 1980s.
- Old Voinche Building (c.1850), a two-story brick commercial building, remodeled in c. 1890, with an Art Deco front added c.1940. Brick cornice from 1850 survives on side. Court was held on its second floor during construction of 1927 courthouse. Comparison of 1981 photo vs. 2016 photo above shows that two-story open gallery of Old Voinche Building (farthest to left in photo) has been restored after being lost in the mid 1900s).
- Old Piazza Store (c. 1930), "one-story brick commercial building with raised parapeted front"
- Old Wilson Building (c.1925), "one-story brick commercial building with raised parapeted front"
- W.W. Voinche Building (c.1925), "one-story brick commercial with shaped gable parapet"
- Deshautlelle Building (c.1925), "two-story brick commercial building with paneled brickwork in parapet"

The district is roughly bounded by Monroe St., Washington St., N. Ogden St., and Bontempt St. in Marksville.
