= KAPB-FM =

Radio station in Marksville, Louisiana

- Marksville, Louisiana; United States
- Broadcast area: Avoyelles Parish; Rapides Parish
- Frequency: 97.7 MHz (HD Radio)
- Branding: 977 The Cajun

Programming
- Language: English
- Format: 1990s-based Classic country, Louisiana Favorites, Classic Rock
- Subchannels: HD2: Urban oldies "Old School 97.7 HD2"
- Affiliations: CBS News; Louisiana Radio Network

Ownership
- Owner: Bontemps Media Services LLC

History
- First air date: August 14, 1971; 55 years ago
- Former call signs: KWLB-FM (1980–1987)
- Call sign meaning: Know Avoyelles Parish Better

Technical information
- Licensing authority: FCC
- Facility ID: 67036
- Class: A
- ERP: 6,000 watts
- HAAT: 100 meters (330 ft)
- Transmitter coordinates: 31°7′27.7″N 92°4′40.5″W

Links
- Public license information: Public file; LMS
- Webcast: Listen live Listen live (HD2)
- Website: 977thecajun.com

KAPB-FM (97.7 MHz) is an American radio station broadcasting a 1990s-based classic country format. Licensed to Marksville, Louisiana, United States, the station is currently owned by Bontemps Media Services LLC. Station was associated with KAPB-AM 1370 kHz.

== History ==
The station was assigned the call letters KWLB-FM on 1980-08-01. On 1987-06-25, the station changed its call sign to the current KAPB-FM.

The initials "KAPB" stand for Know Avoyelles Parish Better. KAPB tweaked format to 1990s-based classic country along with Louisiana Legends on May 1, 2017. The station has a program called the "Swap Shop" formerly the "Trading Post" where callers can call in and sell, swap, or give away items. The Cajun airs The Saturday Morning Get Together with Terry Laborde from 6-12PM highlighting Louisiana Swamp Pop, Zydeco and Cajun music. The Cajun also airs The Classic Pig Roast, playing earlier classics from the 1950s to the 1980s from 12-4 Saturdays and 12-3 Sundays with Pat's Place following with Cajun music until 6PM. KAPB transitioned to HD Radio in October 2024 to coincide with its 70th anniversary. KAPB-HD2 was placed on the air with a classic R&B format "Old School 977-2" featuring R&B from the late ’60s to the late ’80s.
