= Marksville High School =

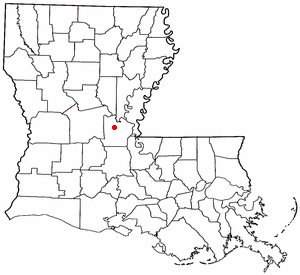

Location
- 407 West Bon Temps; Marksville, Louisiana 71351; United States; 31.127294°N 92.0722°W

Information
- Type: Free public
- Motto: Expect Excellence
- School district: Avoyelles Parish School Board
- Teaching staff: 34.75 (FTE)
- Grades: 7–12
- Enrollment: 659 (2023–2024)
- Student to teacher ratio: 18.96
- Campus type: Urban
- Colors: Purple and Gold
- Mascot: Tiger
- Nickname: Tigers
- Website: mhs.avoyellespsb.com

Marksville High School is a high school located in the city of Marksville, Louisiana, United States. It is a 7th through 12th grade school with 915 students enrolled.

The school dates to 1856, when it was established through the work of superintendent Pierre-Adolphe Lafargue, a native of the Pyrenees Mountains region of France. Lafargue was also a mayor of Marksville.

== Academic performance ==
The school had a 47.7% graduation rate in 2008–09, with a 59.5% drop out rate the previous school year. School Performance Scores (SPS) are given each year by the Louisiana Department of Education. The 2010-11 School Performance Score (SPS) was 45.5, a significant decrease from 2009-2010 which had a SPS score of 73.5. The SPS from 06–07 & 07–08 was 73.5, but declined to 70.1 in 08-09 academic year. Therefore, the school has remained stagnant in growth and performance from 06-10, but the 2010-11 SPS scores mark a decline in growth and performance. Louisiana's goal is for every school to have a SPS of 120 by 2014.

== Clubs and organizations ==
- 4-H
- Beta Club
- FBLA
- FCS
- FFA
- Jr. Beta Club
- La Gear Up/Explorer's Club
- Publications/Yearbook Staff
- Student Council
- Twirlers
- Falling Band

== Athletics ==
Marksville High athletics competes in the LHSAA.

- Baseball - Varsity
- Basketball - Girls' Varsity
- Basketball - Boys' Varsity
- Cheerleading
- Cheerleading - JH
- Cheerleading - JV
- Danceline
- Danceline-JV
- Football (JV only)
- Softball - Varsity
- Track and field
- Marching band
- Tennis

== Notable people ==
- D'Anthony Batiste - NFL and CFL football player
- Edwin Edwards - four-term Louisiana governor
- Elaine Edwards - Louisiana senator
- Isaiah Greenhouse - NFL football player
- Raymond Laborde - five-term Louisiana representative
- Chad Lavalais - NFL football player
- Tommy Neck - NFL football player
- John H. Overton - US senator
