= D'Anthony Batiste =

American football player and coach (born 1982)

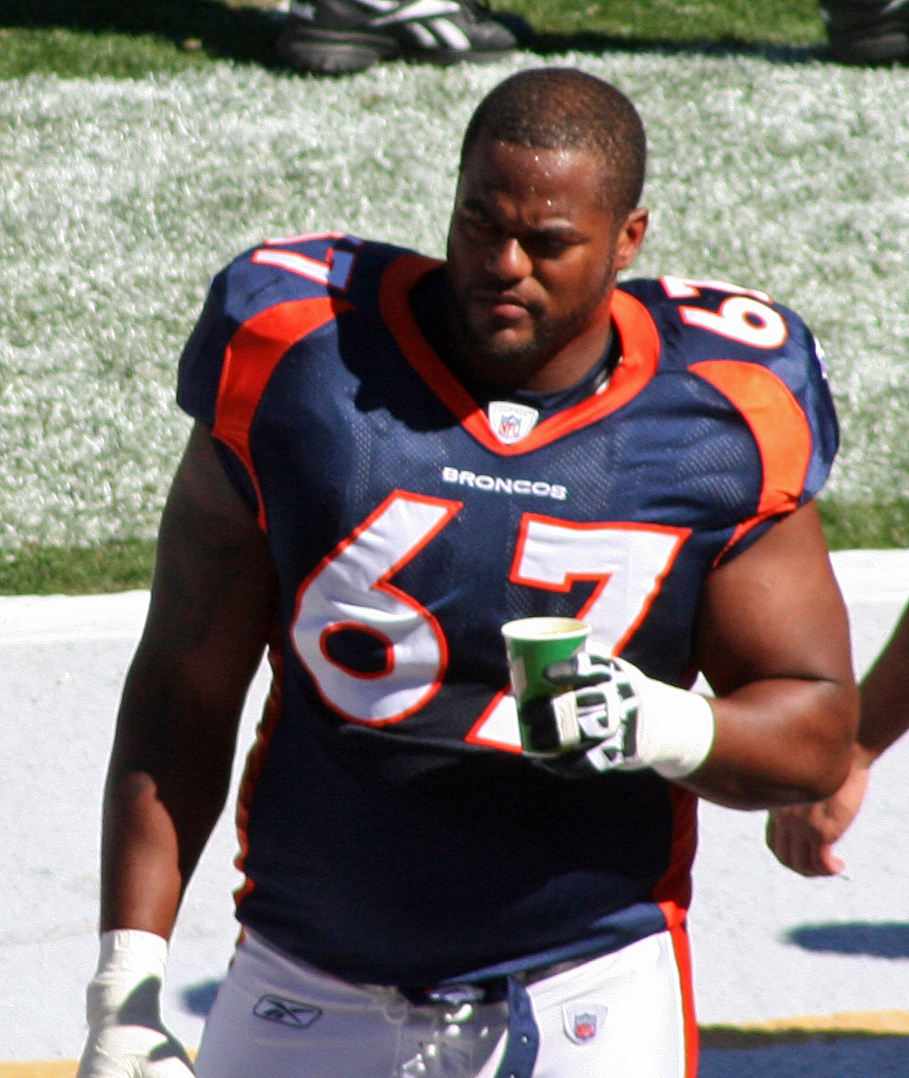
- Batiste with the Denver Broncos in 2010

Las Vegas Raiders
- Title: Strength and conditioning assistant

Personal information
- Born: March 29, 1982 (age 44); Marksville, Louisiana, U.S.
- Listed height: 6 ft 4 in (1.93 m)
- Listed weight: 315 lb (143 kg)

Career information
- High school: Marksville
- College: Louisiana-Lafayette
- NFL draft: 2004: undrafted

Career history

Playing
- Bossier-Shreveport Battle Wings (2004); Edmonton Eskimos (2006)*; Dallas Cowboys (2006)*; Carolina Panthers (2006); Atlanta Falcons (2007–2008); Washington Redskins (2008–2009); Denver Broncos (2009–2010); Arizona Cardinals (2010–2012); Pittsburgh Steelers (2013)*; Edmonton Eskimos (2014−2017)
- * Offseason or practice squad member only

Coaching
- Oakland / Las Vegas Raiders (2018–present) Strength and conditioning assistant

Awards and highlights
- Grey Cup champion (2015); CFL West All-Star (2015); Second-team All-Sun Belt (2003)

Career NFL statistics
- Games played: 37
- Games started: 14
- Fumble recoveries: 1
- Stats at Pro Football Reference

Career CFL statistics
- Games played: 56
- Stats at CFL.ca

D'Anthony Batiste (born March 29, 1982) is an American football coach and former player who is the strength and conditioning assistant for the Las Vegas Raiders of the National Football League (NFL). He is a former offensive tackle for the Dallas Cowboys, Carolina Panthers, Atlanta Falcons, Washington Redskins, Denver Broncos and Arizona Cardinals. He also was a member of the Edmonton Eskimos in the Canadian Football League and the Bossier-Shreveport Battle Wings in the af2. He played college football for the Louisiana–Lafayette Ragin' Cajuns.

== Early life ==
Batiste attended Marksville High School in his hometown of Marksville, Louisiana, helping his team to three consecutive playoff appearances from 1996 to 1998, while playing tight end and defensive end. He was named all-state, all-district, all-parish and all-region during high school career.

== College career ==
Batiste accepted a football scholarship from the University of Louisiana at Lafayette. He was converted into an offensive guard during his freshman season and had 2 starts. He was a four-year letterman and was named second-team All-Sun Belt selection in his senior season.

== Professional career ==
=== Arena Football League ===
==== Bossier-Shreveport Battle Wings ====
In 2006, after going undrafted in the 2004 NFL draft, Batiste signed with the Bossier-Shreveport Battle Wings of the AF2 and played one season.

=== Canadian Football League ===
==== Edmonton Eskimos ====
In 2006, he signed with the Edmonton Eskimos of the Canadian Football League, but was released after just two preseason games.

==== Return to the Edmonton Eskimos ====
On February 4, 2014, he signed as a free agent with the Edmonton Eskimos of the Canadian Football League. He was activated off the one-game injured list in Week 3 to make 15 starts at right tackle. The next year, he had 18 starts at right tackle and received West-Division All-Star honors. In total D'Anthony Batiste played in 56 games for the Eskimos in four seasons.

=== National Football League ===
==== Dallas Cowboys ====
On June 16, 2006, Batiste was signed by the Cowboys as an undrafted free agent, based on the recommendations of a Cowboys scout that saw him play in the Eskimos' practices. On September 2, he was waived and signed to the team's practice squad two days later.

==== Carolina Panthers ====
On October 14, 2006, he was signed by the Carolina Panthers from the Dallas Cowboys' practice squad, but did not see action in any games. He was released on September 1, 2007.

==== Atlanta Falcons ====
On September 2, 2007, he was claimed off waivers by the Atlanta Falcons. He started his first career game against Indianapolis Colts and went on to start a total of 4 games during the season. On August 30, 2008, the Falcons waived him during final cuts and signed him to the practice squad two days later.

==== Washington Redskins ====
On December 10, 2008, Batiste was signed by the Washington Redskins from the Falcons practice squad. In 2009, he appeared in eight games for the Redskins, before being waived on December 15 when the team signed linebacker Curtis Gatewood.

==== Denver Broncos ====
On December 23, 2009, Batiste was signed to the Denver Broncos' practice squad. He was released on October 17, 2010.

==== Arizona Cardinals ====
On November 16, 2010, Batiste was signed by the Arizona Cardinals after starting right tackle Brandon Keith suffered an injury. In 2011, he was declared inactive in 12 games and played in 4. In 2012, he started 10 games at left tackle, before being passed on the depth chart by Nate Potter.

==== Pittsburgh Steelers ====
On August 3, 2013, Batiste was signed as a free agent by the Pittsburgh Steelers. He was cut on August 25.

== Coaching career ==
=== Oakland Raiders ===
On March 1, 2018, Batiste announced his retirement as a player to become the strength and conditioning assistant with the Oakland Raiders of the National Football League (NFL).

== Personal life ==
Batiste worked as a sheriff's deputy in Lafayette, Louisiana, until signing a contract with the Dallas Cowboys of the NFL in 2006. He is of Haitian descent.
