= Avoyelles Journal =

American newspaper

- Type: Weekly newspaper
- Owner(s): Randy DeCuir; Avoyelles Publishing Company
- Publisher: The Secretary
- Editor: Randy DeCuir
- Founded: 1978
- Headquarters: Marksville, Louisiana
- Circulation: 17,000
- OCLC number: 849658460
- Website: avoyellestoday.com

The Avoyelles Journal is a free independent weekly newspaper serving Avoyelles Parish, Louisiana, United States. It is published on Sundays and has circulation of around 17,000. It is headquartered in Marksville, Louisiana with one branch in Bunkie, Louisiana. It began publication in 1978, founded by Randy DeCuir. In 1986 it added a Wednesday advertising edition with business news The newspaper sponsors the annual Avoyellean of the Year award which honors a local citizen who has made notable contributions to the parish of Avoyelles.

As of 1999, the paper was based in a 19th-century building, formerly the "Jules Coco Store".
