= Retalhos da Vida de Um Médico =

1962 film

- Directed by: Jorge Brum do Canto
- Written by: Jorge Brum do Canto; Fernando Namora
- Produced by: Felipe de Solms
- Starring: Jorge Sousa Costa
- Cinematography: Mário Moreira
- Edited by: Jorge Brum do Canto
- Release date: 1962
- Running time: 93 minutes
- Country: Portugal
- Language: Portuguese

Retalhos da Vida de Um Médico is a 1962 Portuguese drama film directed by Jorge Brum do Canto. It was entered into the 13th Berlin International Film Festival.

The film is based on the book of the same name written by Fernando Namora. It contains several separate stories, each from the life of a physician and told as first-person narrative from the memory of the central character, drawing a realistic picture of the life of a physician with the use of many adjectives.

== Cast ==
- Jorge Sousa Costa - Doctor
- João Guedes - Dr. Valenca
- Emilio Correia - Pharmacist
- Irene Cruz - Luisa
- Costa Ferreira
- Ruy Furtado
- Maria Olguim
- Leónia Mendes
- Manuela Bonito
- Rudolfo Neves
- Ivone de Moura
- Mário Sargedas
- António Machado
- Emídio Ribeiro Pratas
- Ângela Ribeiro
