= George Ross (Australian footballer) =

Australian rules footballer, born 1901

Personal information
- Full name: George Edward Ross
- Born: 2 May 1901; Abbotsford, Victoria
- Died: 1 January 1989 (aged 87)
- Original team: Sandringham Amateurs
- Height: 170 cm (5 ft 7 in)
- Weight: 86 kg (190 lb)

Playing career^{1}
Years	Club	Games (Goals)
1923	Richmond	1 (0)
- ^{1} Playing statistics correct to the end of 1923.

George Edward Ross (2 May 1901 – 1 January 1989) was an Australian rules footballer who played with Richmond in the Victorian Football League (VFL).

After leaving the VFL, he coached Coburg Amateurs Football Club in the Victorian Amateur Football Association from 1931 until 1941.
