= Peder Puck =

Norwegian footballer (1892-1989)

Personal information
- Date of birth: 24 September 1892
- Date of death: 10 January 1989 (aged 96)

International career
Years	Team	Apps	(Gls)
1917	Norway	1	(0)

Peder Puck (24 September 1892 – 10 January 1989) was a Norwegian footballer. He played in one match for the Norway national football team in 1917.
