= Hai Deng =

32nd abbot of Shaolin Temple

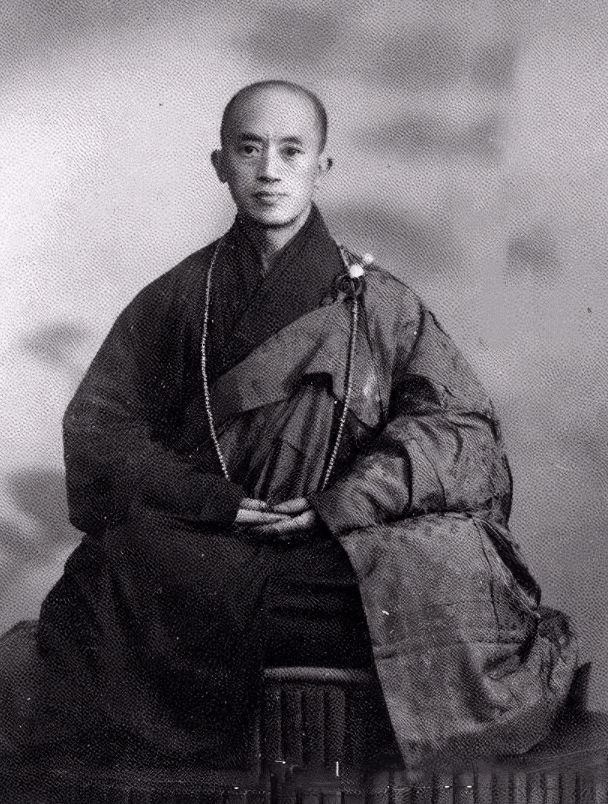
Master Hai Deng

Haideng (Chinese: 释海灯; pinyin: Shì Hǎidēng; also sometimes spelled as Hai Teng and Hai-tank in older translations) (14 August 1902 – 11 January 1989) was a Chinese Buddhist monk, martial artist and emeritus abbot of Shaolin Temple during the 20th century. He was born Fan Wubing (Chinese: 范无病) in Jiangyou County, Sichuan province. His parents gave him the name "Fan Wubing", which means Fan the Never Sick, in hopes that this might improve his being constantly sick when he was young.

At the age of 19, Fan Wubing was accepted into Sichuan University, but did not attend due to financial difficulties. Instead, he attended Sichuan Police Academy, but later dropped out in pursuit of martial arts training.

Hai Deng was famous for his one-finger Chan, one of the 72 arts of the Shaolin temple, with which he could support most of his body weight on one finger. Thanks to a visit to the US in 1985, he was noted for his religious observance, literary skill, and qigong talents. He Was first met with the Master Xu Yun (Empty Cloud.)
