= Constantino Esteves =

Portuguese film director (1914–1985)

- Born: Constantino Esteves; October 22, 1914; Lisbon, Portugal
- Died: 1985
- Occupation(s): Director, Production Designer
- Years active: 1941–1969

Constantino Esteves (October 22, 1914 – 1985) was a Portuguese film director.
