= H. Claude Hudson =

American businessman

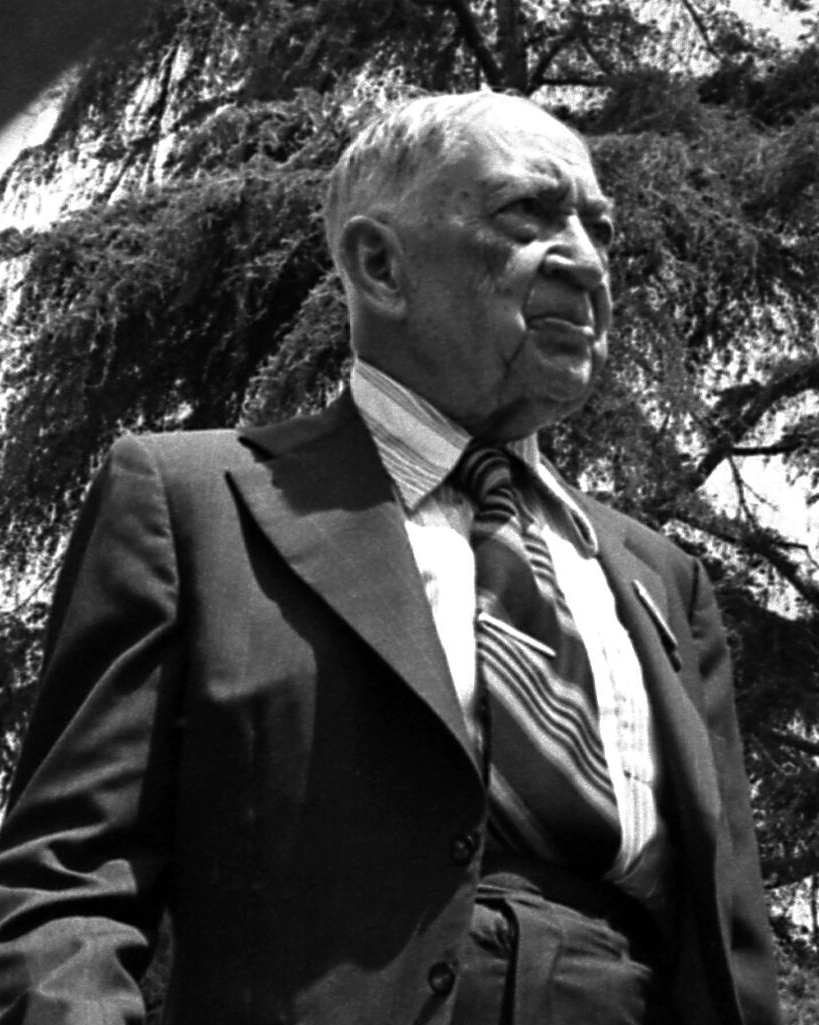
- Hudson in 1975
- Born: April 19, 1886; Marksville, Louisiana
- Died: January 26, 1989 (aged 102); Los Angeles, California
- Education: Howard University
- Occupations: Businessman, dentist
- Known for: Helped found Broadway Federal Savings and Loan Association, civil rights

H. Claude Hudson (1886–1989) was a prominent American businessman and advocate for civil rights, best known for helping to found the Broadway Federal Savings and Loan Association (now Broadway Federal Bank) in Los Angeles. In 1931, he was the first African-American graduate of Loyola Law School in Los Angeles.

== Biography ==
Henry Claude Hudson was born in Marksville, Louisiana on April 19, 1886.

Hudson studied at Wiley College in Marshall, Texas, and later earned a degree in dentistry from Howard University in 1913. He was active in the Niagara Movement, the predecessor to the NAACP, working with figures such as W.E.B. Du Bois and Moorfield Storey. Hudson and his family moved to Los Angeles in 1923, where he helped integrate the public beaches with the help of Georgia Ann Robinson. He also served as the president of the Los Angeles Chapter of the NAACP.

In 1946, he helped found Broadway Federal Bank. Hudson served as chairman of the board from 1949 to 1972. His son Elbert Hudson succeeded him as chairman, followed by his grandson Paul C. Hudson, who took over leadership of the bank in 1992.

Hudson died in his sleep, on January 26, 1989, at the age of 102. He is buried at the Evergreen Cemetery in Los Angeles.
