= Frits Schipper =

Dutch footballer

Personal information
- Date of birth: 24 December 1904
- Date of death: 23 January 1989 (aged 84)

International career
| Years | Team | Apps | (Gls) |
| 1928 | Netherlands | 1 | (0) |

Frits Schipper (24 December 1904 – 23 January 1989) was a Dutch footballer. He played in one match for the Netherlands national football team in 1928.
