= Nigel Bloy =

English cricketer and Royal Air Force officer

Personal information
- Full name: Nigel Clement Francis Bloy
- Born: 2 January 1923; Plymouth, Devon, England
- Died: 7 January 1989 (aged 66); Sherborne, Dorset, England
- Batting: Left-handed
- Bowling: Leg break

Domestic team information
- Years: Team
- 1958–1961: Dorset
- 1954–1958: Marylebone Cricket Club
- 1951–1957: Devon
- 1946–1948: Oxford University

Career statistics
Competition	First-class
Matches	31
Runs scored	964
Batting average	21.90
100s/50s	–/1
Top score	77
Balls bowled	814
Wickets	8
Bowling average	76.62
5 wickets in innings	–
10 wickets in match	–
Best bowling	3/80
Catches/stumpings	15/–
- Source: Cricinfo, 13 April 2011

Nigel Clement Francis Bloy (2 January 1923 – 7 January 1989) was an English cricketer and Royal Air Force officer. Bloy was a left-handed batsman who bowled leg break. He was born in Plymouth, Devon.

Bloy reached the age of active service in the British Armed Forces during the Second World War. He was mentioned in a supplement to the London Gazette in 1943 as having been placed on Royal Air Force Volunteer Reserve. By 1950 he was still active within the Royal Air Force and in December 1949, he had been promoted to Flying Officer.

Bloy made his first-class debut for Oxford University against Gloucestershire in 1946. He played 28 first-class matches for the university from 1946 to 1948, with his final appearance for it coming against Surrey. Bloy scored 862 runs for the university, at a batting average of 22.10, with two half centuries and a high score of 77. His highest score for the university came against Yorkshire in his second first-class match in 1946. He was eventually dismissed in this innings by Len Hutton. He made further first-class appearances for the Free Foresters in 1951 against Oxford University and later in 1954 and 1958 against Ireland while touring with the Marylebone Cricket Club.

Bloy briefly played for the Gloucestershire Second XI, before joining Devon where he represented the county in the Minor Counties Championship from 1951 to 1957. He later played Minor counties cricket for Dorset from 1958 to 1961.

He died in Sherborne, Dorset on 7 January 1989.
