= KLIL =

- Moreauville, Louisiana; United States
- Frequency: 92.1 MHz
- Branding: Stereo 92.1

Programming
- Language: English
- Format: Classic hits
- Affiliations: ABC News Radio; Westwood One; New Orleans Saints Radio Network

Ownership
- Owner: Cajun Broadcasting, Inc.
- Sister stations: KZLG

History
- First air date: July 24, 1980
- Call sign meaning: Founding operators were Louis and Lil Coco

Technical information
- Licensing authority: FCC
- Facility ID: 8164
- Class: A
- ERP: 6,000 watts
- HAAT: 91 meters (299 ft)
- Transmitter coordinates: 31°2′53.6″N 91°59′47.4″W

Links
- Public license information: Public file; LMS
- Webcast: Listen live

KLIL (92.1 FM, "Stereo 92.1") is an American radio station licensed to Moreauville, Louisiana, United States. The station is owned by Cajun Broadcasting, Inc. It broadcasts a classic hits music format from Westwood One. Its studios and transmitter are co-located in Moreauville.

The station began broadcasting on July 24, 1980, as the second FM station in the area and the first since KAPB (1370 AM) went on the air in the 1950s.

KLIL is an affiliate of the New Orleans Saints radio network.
