= Albert Hofstadter =

Twentieth-century American philosopher

- Born: March 28, 1910; New York City, U.S.
- Died: January 26, 1989 (aged 78)

Education
- Education: City College of New York (B.Sc., 1929); Columbia University (M.A., 1934; Ph.D., 1935)

Philosophical work
- Era: 20th-century philosophy
- Region: Western philosophy
- School: Continental philosophy Phenomenology
- Institutions: New York University; Columbia University; University of California, Santa Cruz; New School for Social Research
- Main interests: Aesthetics, philosophy of literature

Albert Hofstadter (March 28, 1910 – January 26, 1989) was an American philosopher.

== Life and career ==
Hofstadter taught at Columbia University (1950–67), the University of California, Santa Cruz (1968–75) and the New School for Social Research (1976–78). He was the elder brother of physicist and Nobel laureate Robert Hofstadter and the uncle of Robert's son, Douglas Hofstadter.

== Thoughts on the later Heidegger ==
As a Heidegger scholar, Hofstadter contends that Heidegger is able to shape and use language in keeping with his basic insight that language is the house of Being, i.e., where humans dwell. "It is by staying with the thinking the language itself does that Heidegger is able to rethink, and thus think anew, the oldest, the perennial and perennially forgotten thoughts." One of these is the Being of beings in the sense of aletheia. Hofstadter praises Heidegger's project to free human beings from alienated ways of relating to things, "letting us find in it a real dwelling place instead of the cold, sterile hostelry in which we presently find ourselves."

== Major works ==
=== Books (authored and edited) ===
- Philosophies of Art and Beauty: Selected Readings in Aesthetics from Plato to Heidegger. co-edited by Richard Kuhns. Modern Library. 1964.
- Truth and Art. Columbia University Press. 1965.
- Agony and Epitaph: Man, His Art, and His Poetry. George Braziller. 1970. ISBN 978-0-8076-0544-8.

=== Translations ===
- Heidegger, Martin (1982). The Basic Problems of Phenomenology. Translated by Albert Hofstadter. Indiana University Press. ISBN 9780253176868.
- Heidegger, Martin (1971). Poetry, Language, Thought. Translated by Albert Hofstadter. Harper Collins.
