= Naomi Chapman Woodroof =

American agriculturalist

- Born: Naomi Chapman; February 5, 1900
- Died: January 4, 1989 (aged 88)
- Education: Degree in Agriculture from the University of Idaho College of Agriculture
- Spouse: Jasper Guy Woodroof
- Awards: Honorary Member of the "Ton-an-Acre" Peanut Club
- Scientific career
- Fields: Agriculture

Naomi Chapman Woodroof (February 5, 1900 – January 4, 1989) was an American agriculturalist known for increasing peanut yields five-fold. She was the first woman to attend and graduate from the University of Idaho College of Agriculture and achieved posthumous recognition for her research, including the breeding of peanuts, the fertilization of pecans, and the prevention and control of cotton diseases.

== Early life ==
Woodroof was born on February 5, 1900, to parents James Leslie Chapman and Grace Ora Chapman, a pioneer family, who settled in Idaho along the Snake River. She grew up on a ranch responsible for the care of both sheep and cattle. Due to growing up on her parents' ranch, she decided to further her education in the area of animal husbandry by attending the University of the Idaho College of Agriculture.

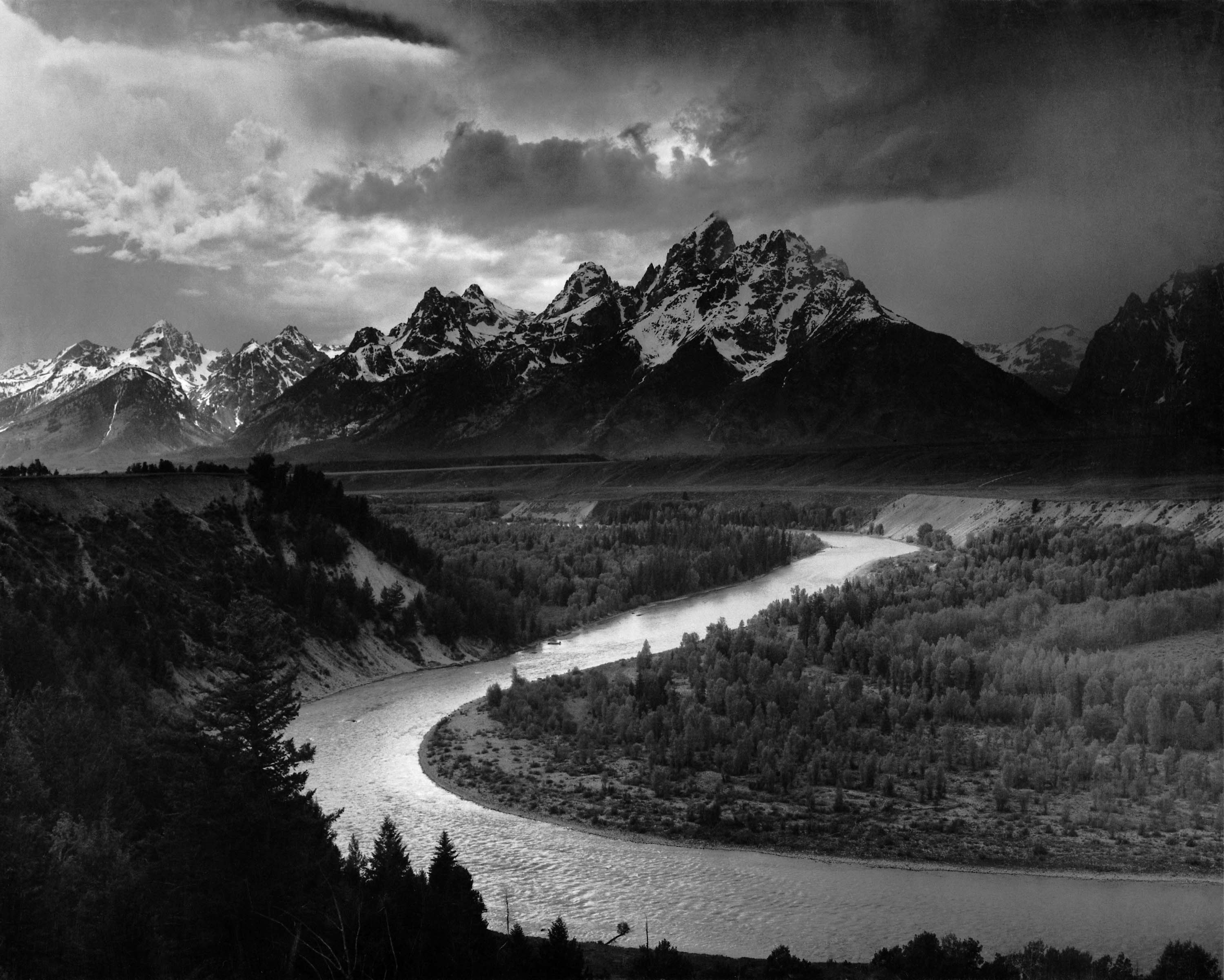
The Snake River, which Naomi Chapman Woodroof had to cross twice each day in order to attend school.

== Career ==
Woodroof was the first woman student and first woman to graduate from the University of the Idaho College of Agriculture, and the first woman to be inducted into the Georgia Agriculture Hall of Fame due to her research in peanut farming. She was responsible for founding the Plant Pathology Department located at the Coastal Plain Experiment Station where she became an essential component to the developments in peanut breeding. Here she developed a method of breeding which allowed for a fivefold increase in peanut crops. This development allowed Georgia to become the United States' leading producer of peanuts. Because of her findings regarding peanuts, she was named an honorary member of the "Ton-an-Acre" Peanut Club.

In her later years, she traveled to underdeveloped countries and shared information regarding disease control among crops, how to increase the harvest amount, and better methods of storing food.

== Marriage and children ==
While working on a pecan project, she met Jasper Guy Woodroof whom she married in 1926. They had three children: Jane, Cade, and Jasper. When her husband was named the first President of the Abraham Baldwin Agricultural College, the family moved to Tifton, Georgia, where Woodroof continued her peanut research.

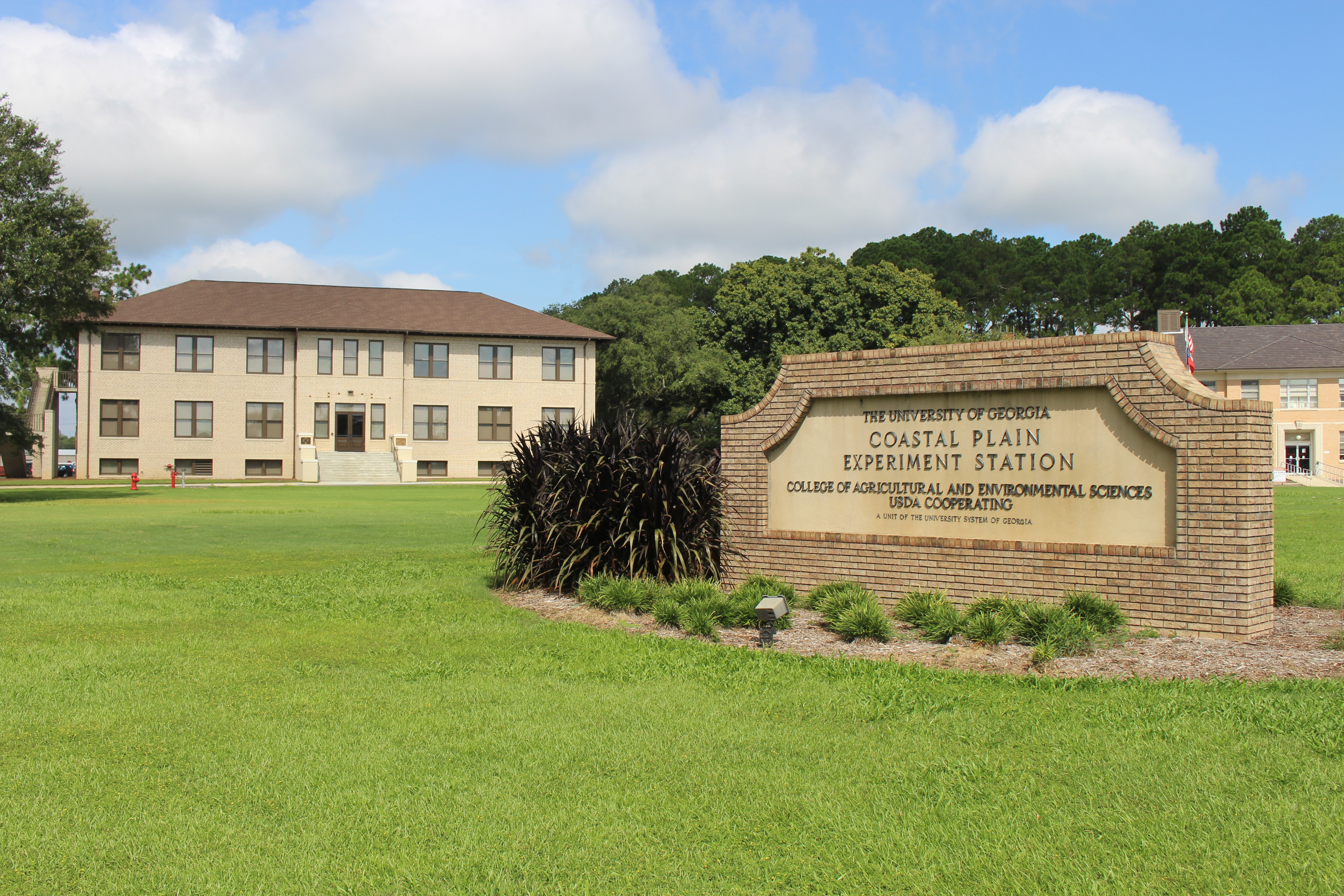
Coastal Plain Experiment Station

== Death ==
Naomi Chapman Woodroof died on January 4, 1989, at 88 years old. According to her son-in-law, "she was way ahead of her time, she was working in a man's world, but she was not competing, she was simply contributing."

== Works cited ==
- Ackers, Lawrence K. (September 19, 2003). "Naomi Chapman Woodroof (1900-1989)". New Georgia Encyclopedia.
- Boorstin, Abigail (December 12, 2019). "Genetics of Peanuts". New Georgia Encyclopedia.
- Emert, Donna (n.d.). "Naomi Chapman Woodroof: A Life of Significant Yield". College of Agricultural and Life Sciences. University of Idaho.
- "Naomi Chapman Woodroof". College of Agricultural & Environmental Sciences. University of Georgia. September 19, 1997.
