= Harry Moore (Australian footballer) =

Australian rules footballer

Personal information
- Full name: Harry Moore
- Born: 24 January 1928
- Died: 27 January 1989 (aged 61)
- Original team: South Surfers
- Height: 184 cm (6 ft 0 in)
- Weight: 86 kg (190 lb)

Playing career^{1}
Years	Club	Games (Goals)
1951	South Melbourne	13 (0)
- ^{1} Playing statistics correct to the end of 1951.

Harry Moore (24 January 1928 – 27 January 1989) was an Australian rules footballer who played with South Melbourne in the Victorian Football League (VFL).
