= Leslie Halliwell =

British film critic (1929–1989)

- Halliwell featuring on the cover of the January 1987 issue of Films and Filming
- Born: Robert James Leslie Halliwell; 23 February 1929; Bolton, Lancashire, England
- Died: 21 January 1989 (aged 59); Esher, Surrey, England
- Occupations: Film critic, encyclopaedist
- Years active: 1952−1987

Robert James Leslie Halliwell (23 February 1929 – 21 January 1989) was a British film critic, encyclopaedist and television rights buyer for ITV, the British commercial network, and Channel 4. He is best known for his reference guides, Filmgoer's Companion (1965), a single volume film-related encyclopaedia featuring biographies (with credits) and technical terms, and Halliwell's Film Guide (1977), which is dedicated to individual films.

Anthony Quinton wrote in The Times Literary Supplement: "Immersed in the enjoyment of these fine books, one should look up for a moment to admire the quite astonishing combination of industry and authority in one man which has brought them into existence."

Halliwell's promotion of the cinema through his books and seasons of "golden oldies'"on Channel 4 won him awards from the London Film Critics' Circle, the British Film Institute and a posthumous BAFTA.

== Early life ==
Born in Bolton, Lancashire in 1929, Halliwell enjoyed films from an early age. He grew up during the Golden Age of Hollywood, a period when film production was at its peak, with new releases debuting in cinemas with great regularity. Halliwell went almost nightly to the cinema with his mother, Lily, which provided an escape from the at times tough reality of their mill town. In 1939, Halliwell won a scholarship to Bolton School. After national service, he went on to study English Literature at St Catharine's College, Cambridge.

== The Rex Cinema, Cambridge ==
After graduating with a 2:1 honours degree, Halliwell worked briefly for Picturegoer magazine in London, before returning to Cambridge to manage the Rex Cinema from 1952 to 1956. Under his management, the cinema became extremely popular with the Cambridge undergraduate community, showing classic films such as The Blue Angel, Citizen Kane and Destry Rides Again. The Cambridge Evening News reported that "students felt their periods at Cambridge were incomplete without the weekly visit to the Rex." In 1955, after the British Censor had banned the Marlon Brando film The Wild One, Halliwell arranged for Cambridge magistrates to assess the picture. They subsequently granted him a special licence, and so the Rex became one of the few cinemas in Britain to show the film.

== Television career ==
After leaving the Rex, Halliwell joined the Rank Organisation in 1956 on a three-year trainee course. He was then employed as a film publicist for the company. In 1958, he joined Southern Television, and was seconded to Granada Television a year later, where he remained for the next thirty years, at their offices in London's Golden Square. He married Ruth Porter in 1959 and they had one son. Initially appointed as Cecil Bernstein's assistant, Halliwell gained the role of Film Adviser to Granada's show Cinema, which was the most popular arts programme on television during the 1960s.

Halliwell was given responsibility for buying TV shows and in 1968 became the chief film buyer for the ITV network, a role he maintained throughout the 1970s and most of the 1980s. Travelling to Hollywood twice a year to view the latest TV pilots and film offerings and to trade fairs in Cannes and Monte Carlo, Halliwell became a major player in the television industry. In his capacity as chief buyer for the ITV network, he was responsible for bringing to British television screens some of the highest rated shows of the 1970s and 1980s, including The Six Million Dollar Man, Charlie's Angels, The Incredible Hulk, and The A-Team, as well as the James Bond film series, Jaws, and Star Wars.

In 1982, at the invitation of Jeremy Isaacs, he became buyer and scheduler of films for Channel 4. In keeping with the channel's intention to appeal to specialist audiences, Halliwell focused primarily on films from the 1930s and '40s. Over the next few years, the channel showed hundreds of vintage movies in seasons, with many titles introduced by filmmakers such as Samuel Goldwyn Jnr, Frank Launder and Sidney Gilliat. Isaacs later wrote that Halliwell had made an "unsurpassed contribution" to the channel's success. The British Film Institute gave Halliwell an award in 1985 'for the selection and acquisition of films with a view to creative scheduling.' Author and film historian Jeffrey Richards wrote:

For lovers of the golden age of the cinema like myself, Channel 4 became a source of unalloyed delight as time and again one encountered films one had only ever read about and never expected to see.

During this period, Halliwell also presented two television series celebrating the British wartime documentary movement: Home Front, for Granada in 1982 and The British at War for Channel 4 two years later. Both featured Ministry of Information productions such as Listen to Britain, Desert Victory and The True Glory.

== Encyclopaedias ==
=== The Filmgoer's Companion ===
First published in 1965, The Filmgoer's Companion sold ten thousand copies on its first run, including four thousand in the United States. In all, Halliwell edited nine editions of the Companion, which is now known as Halliwell's Who's Who in the Movies. The book was highly influential and critically acclaimed, with TV presenter Denis Norden comparing the companion to the Wisden Cricketers' Almanack. Gene Siskel wrote in 1975:

There is a well-developed consensus among film scribes that Leslie Halliwell's The Filmgoer's Companion is the single most valuable reference book on film."

Others were less enthusiastic, criticising Halliwell's subjectivity and occasionally reactionary opinions on the films included, as well as the bias towards older films. Charles Champlin of the Los Angeles Times wrote in 1979 that "the referrer needs an iron will to look up only one fact," in reference to the perceived density of the book.

=== Halliwell's Film Guide ===
First published in 1977 and updated, Halliwell's Film Guide originally incorporated capsule reviews and information on over 8,000 English-speaking titles. He used a four-star rating system similar in appearance to the system used by Steven Scheuer and (with slight modification) Leonard Maltin. However, in Halliwell's system even a one-star rating was a definite recommendation. Poor or mediocre films which other critics would rate one or two stars were equally missable to him, so they received no star. In the preface to the fifth edition, he noted that he "aimed to increase the number of critical quotes, especially those given at the time of release by the American trade paper Variety, whose reviews were often a key to commercial success and whose pithy comments give a significant edge to changing film fashions. Other opinions, however, have not been neglected." By the time of Halliwell's death in 1989, the Film Guide had doubled in size. He acknowledged his predecessors in the introduction to the first edition,

I salute especially the work of Leonard Maltin, James Robert Parish, Denis Gifford, Douglas Eames and the unsung anonymous heroes who compiled the reviews of the BFI's Monthly Film Bulletin during the fifties and sixties.

This second work also came in for as much criticism as it did praise. Halliwell came under fire from journalists and critics for the brevity of his assessments, and his dismissive stance on more modern films. His devotion to the Golden Age of Hollywood left him increasingly out of touch with modern attitudes. Observer film critic Philip French wrote that Halliwell "isn't a scholar, critic or cineaste, but rather a movie buff, a man who knows the credits of everything but the value of very little". Jim Emerson of the Orange County Register called Halliwell "something of a grumpy old English fuddy-duddy [who] rarely has anything good to say about any movie made after 1960". Halliwell expressed his views in an essay in this book:

The best kind of film buff loves the movie business for what it can be at its best ... Hollywood at its best - and for Hollywood also read Ealing and Tobis Klangfilm and Svenske Filmindustri - was the purveyor of an expensive and elegant craft which at times touched art, though seldom throughout a whole film. Reality was seldom sought, but why should it be? Real life is not dramatic anyway ... Some of the new films clearly have virtues which the old ones didn't possess: one is grateful for The Graduate and Charlie Bubbles and Cabaret and One Flew Over the Cuckoo's Nest, which for various reasons could never have been made in the old Hollywood. But if my thesis were not largely true, how would one explain the enormous popularity of old movies on television, or the recent deluge of books about them?

=== Halliwell's Television Companion ===
Halliwell's third encyclopaedic work began life as the Teleguide in 1979. Disappointed with the first edition, he joined with Sunday Telegraph critic Philip Purser to produce Halliwell's Television Companion, which ran for a further two editions in 1982 and 1986. The third edition, published by Grafton in 1986, included over 12,000 entries.

== Retirement and death ==
Halliwell retired from the television industry in 1986 but continued to edit his film guides. He wrote a regular TV article for the Daily Mail beginning in 1987, and published a number of historical and critical works about the cinema. He also published three volumes of ghost stories inspired by M. R. James.

Halliwell died in January 1989 of esophageal cancer at the Princess Alice Hospice in Esher, Surrey, a month before his 60th birthday.

== Halliwell's favourite films ==
He wrote essays on his favourite films from the Golden Age in Halliwell's Hundred and in Halliwell's Harvest. He stated that these books "are dedicated to the proposition that art should not be despised because it is popular."

This list of Leslie Halliwell's favourite films was originally published in the fifth edition of the Film Guide.

- Citizen Kane (1941)
- Trouble in Paradise (1932)
- Bride of Frankenstein (1935)
- Le Million (1931)
- A Matter of Life and Death (1946)
- Lost Horizon (1937)
- Sons of the Desert (1933)
- The Philadelphia Story (1940)
- The Maltese Falcon (1941)
- The Lady Vanishes (1938)

== Biography ==
A biography, Halliwell's Horizon, written by Michael Binder, was published in 2011.

== Books authored ==
- 1965 – The Filmgoer's Companion. – ISBN 0-00-255798-3 (editions 1–9 by Halliwell)
- 1973 – The Filmgoer's Book of Quotes. – ISBN 0-583-12889-0
- 1975 – The Clapperboard Book of the Cinema. – with Graham Murray, ISBN 0-246-10814-2
- 1976 – Mountain of Dreams: the Golden Years of Paramount. – ISBN 0-246-10825-8
- 1977 – Halliwell's Movie Quiz. – ISBN 0-905018-42-7
- 1977 – Halliwell's Film Guide. – ISBN 0-00-714412-1 (editions 1–7 by Halliwell)
- 1979 – Halliwell's Television Companion. – ISBN 0-586-08379-0
- 1982 – Halliwell's Hundred. – ISBN 0-246-11330-8
- 1984 – The Ghost of Sherlock Holmes: Seventeen Supernatural Stories. – ISBN 0-586-05995-4
- 1985 – Seats in All Parts: Half a Lifetime at the Movies. – ISBN 0-246-12478-4
- 1986 – Halliwell's Harvest. – ISBN 0-684-18518-0
- 1986 – The Dead that Walk. – ISBN 0-8044-2300-8
- 1987 – A Demon Close Behind. – ISBN 0-7090-2932-2
- 1987 – Double Take and Fade Away. – ISBN 0-246-12835-6
- 1987 – Return to Shangri-La. – ISBN 0-586-07081-8
- 1988 – A Demon on the Stair. – ISBN 0-7090-3181-5
