= Halliwell's Who's Who in the Movies =

Encyclopedic reference of film actors

- Author: Leslie Halliwell
- Language: English
- Genre: Film encyclopedia, reference
- Published: 1965

The Filmgoer's Companion, now published as Halliwell's Who's Who in the Movies, is an encyclopedic reference of film actors, film technicians (cameramen, editors, score composers, and the many other specialist required to make a movie), directors and producers who have produced or performed in the cinema. The format is a brief biographic introduction, followed by a list of films that they have association. It was originally written by Leslie Halliwell, but since his death in 1989, it has been edited by John Walker.

The second half of the book contains information on film themes and genres, a listing of production companies and film studios, a glossary, and some movie awards.

The first edition, published in 1965, included an introduction by Alfred Hitchcock.

== Later editions ==
The 4th edition of Halliwell's Who's Who in the Movies (i.e. the 16th edition of The Filmgoer's Companion) (2006) (ISBN 0007169574) contains 656 pages.
