= KZLG =

- Mansura, Louisiana; United States
- Broadcast area: Alexandria, Louisiana
- Frequency: 95.9 MHz
- Branding: Z 95.9

Programming
- Language: English
- Format: Adult contemporary
- Affiliations: ABC News Radio

Ownership
- Owner: Cajun Broadcasting
- Sister stations: KLIL

History
- First air date: 2000

Technical information
- Licensing authority: FCC
- Facility ID: 88808
- Class: A
- ERP: 12,500 watts
- HAAT: 98 meters (322 ft)
- Transmitter coordinates: 31°2′49.7″N 91°59′41.4″W

Links
- Public license information: Public file; LMS
- Webcast: Listen live

KZLG (95.9 FM, "Z 95.9") is an American radio station broadcasting an adult contemporary format. Licensed to Mansura, Louisiana, United States, the station is owned by Cajun Broadcasting. Its studios and transmitter are co-located in Moreauville.
