= Nguyễn Minh Châu (novelist) =

Vietnamese novelist

Nguyễn Minh Châu (Quỳnh Lưu, 20 October 1930 – 23 January 1989) was a Vietnamese novelist. Châu is noted for in 1978, in the Military Culture journal having been one of the first to call for more humanity and realism, and less propaganda in depiction of Vietnam's struggle.

== Early life ==
Nguyễn Minh Châu was born in 1930, in Văn Thai, as known as Thơi village, Quỳnh Hải, Quỳnh Lưu Dist., Nghệ An Province. According to his wife, Mrs. Nguyễn Thị Doanh, Nguyễn Minh Châu's initial name was Nguyễn Thí. Not until he went to school that his parents changed his name to Minh Châu. In his last writing, "Ngồi buồn viết mà chơi" ("Sit down, write and play") which he wrote in his days at Military Hospital 108, Nguyễn Minh Châu said about himself: "Ever since I was small, I have always been a timid and very shy boy. I was afraid of everything, from mice to monsters. When I grew up after that, even when I was sixty years old, when in a crowd, I just want to hide in a corner and only so do I find safe and sound like a cricket that has gone down to its hole on the ground".
