= Fernando Namora =

Portuguese writer and medical doctor

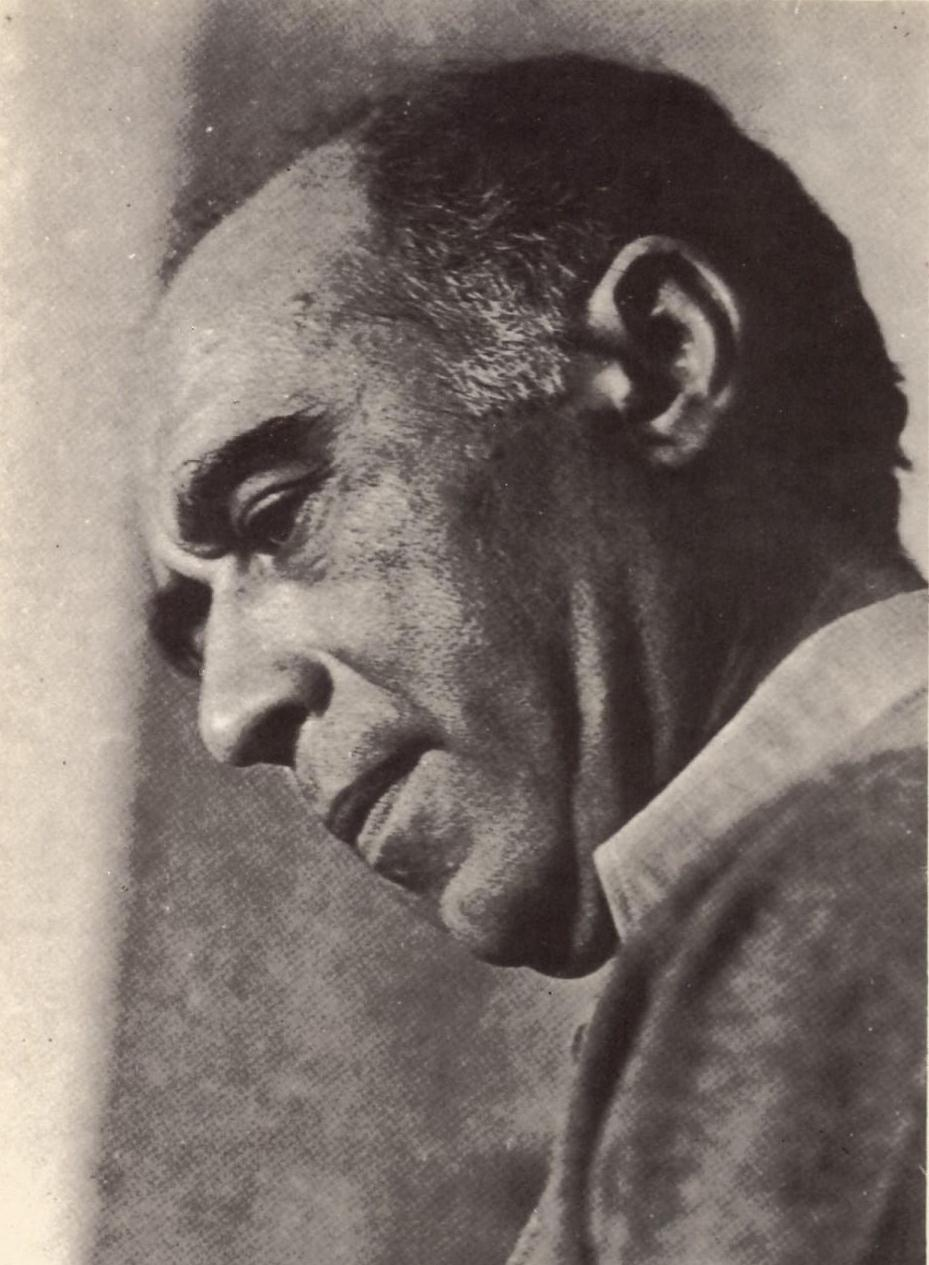
- Namora in 1966
- Born: 15 April 1919; Condeixa-a-Nova
- Died: 31 January 1989 (aged 69); Lisbon
- Occupations: medical doctor, writer
- Writing career
- Period: 1937-1988
- Genre: Literature
- Subjects: poetry, romance and essayism
- Literary movement: Neorealism and Contemporary Fiction
- Website: fernando-namora.blogspot.com

Fernando Gonçalves Namora (15 April 1919 – 31 January 1989) was a Portuguese writer and medical doctor. Namora was born in Condeixa-a-Nova, Coimbra District and died in Lisbon, Portugal.

He received his medical degree at 1942, by the University of Coimbra. Those years as student would have influenced him as a man (and writer) as well his experience as a country doctor, in remote regions as Beira Baixa and Alentejo, till the year of 1950, when he moved to Lisbon, invited to be medical assistant at the Instituto Português de Oncologia.

His early book was Relevos, poetry, in (1937), published at the age of 18. In (1938) appeared his first romance As Sete Partidas do Mundo that won the Almeida Garrett Prize, and, three years later, with some other colleagues at Coimbra, was involved in the literary project of Novo Cancioneiro, (1941), with 10 volumes, which the first one was his poem named Terra - for many specialists the advent of neorealism movement, a milestone in the Portuguese literature. All the early age lyrics are in the anthology As Frias Madrugadas, by 1959. Nevertheless, his youth, Coimbra's student atmosphere romance is Fogo na Noite Escura (1943), at the collection Novos Prosadores (1943), by Coimbra Editora.

Besides over 30 titles, along his fifty years of intensive literary life, not only wrote “neo-realistic” novels, as Casa da Malta (1945), Minas de S. Francisco (1946), Retalhos da Vida de um Médico (1949 and 1963), A Noite e a Madrugada (1950), O Trigo e o Joio (1954), but also “urban themes”, contemporary fiction, as in O Homem Disfarçado (1957), Cidade Solitária (1959), Domingo à Tarde (1961, José Lins do Rego Prize), Os Clandestinos (1972), Resposta a Matilde (1980) or O Rio Triste (1982, Fernando Chinaglia Prize, Fialho de Almeida Prize and D. Dinis Prize). Another cycle was the cadernos de um escritor narratives, a sort of analytic, critic testimonials, regarding “social themes” and the emergence of a new time, specially during the 1960s and 1970s, related with the Geneve International Encounters and the many travels abroad (including Scandinavia), expressed in Diálogo em Setembro (1966), Um Sino na Montanha (1968), Os Adoradores do Sol (1971), Estamos no Vento (1974), A Nave de Pedra (1975), Cavalgada Cinzenta (1977), URSS, Mal Amada, Bem Amada and Sentados na Relva, from (1986).

Namora was suggested for the Nobel Prize in 1981.

== Works ==
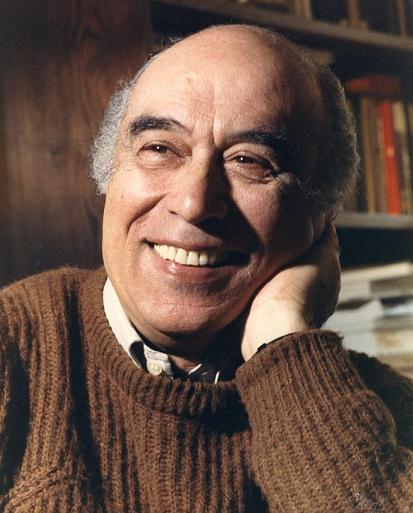
Namora (mid 1980s)

- As Sete Partidas do Mundo, romance – 1938
- Fogo na Noite Escura, romance – 1943
- Casa da Malta, romance – 1945
- Minas de San Francisco,'romance – 1946
- Retalhos da Vida de um Médico, narratives / first part – 1949
- A Noite e a Madrugada, romance – 1950
- Deuses e Demónios da Medicina, biografies – 1952
- O Trigo e o Joio, romance – 1954
- O Homem Disfarçado, romance – 1957
- Cidade Solitária, narrative – 1959
- As Frias Madrugadas, poems – 1959
- Domingo à Tarde, romance – 1961
- Retalhos da Vida de um Médico, narratives / second part – 1963
- Diálogo em Setembro, romanced chronicle – 1966
- Um Sino na Montanha, writer caderns – 1968
- Marketing, poesia – 1969
- Os Adoradores do Sol, writer caderns – 1971
- Os Clandestinos, romance – 1972
- Estamos no Vento, literary-sociologic narrative – 1974
- A Nave de Pedra, writer caderns – 1975
- Cavalgada Cinzenta, narrative – 1977
- Encontros, interviews – 1979
- Resposta a Matilde, divertimento – 1980
- O Rio Triste, romance – 1982
- Nome para uma Casa, poems – 1984
- URSS mal amada, bem amada, chronicle – 1986
- Sentados na Relva, writer caderns – 1986
- Jornal sem Data, writer caderns – 1988
