= Hospital Pulido Valente =

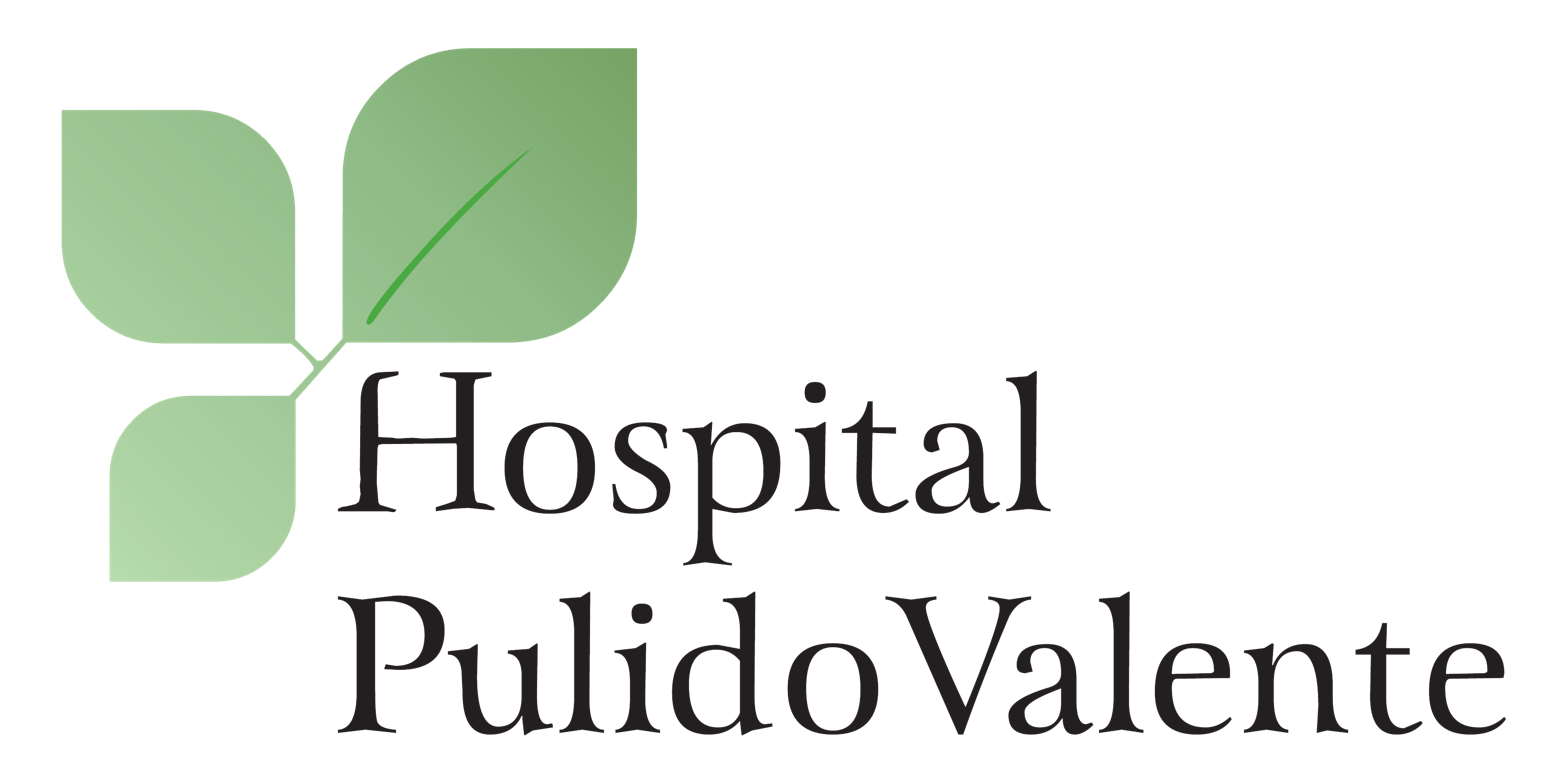

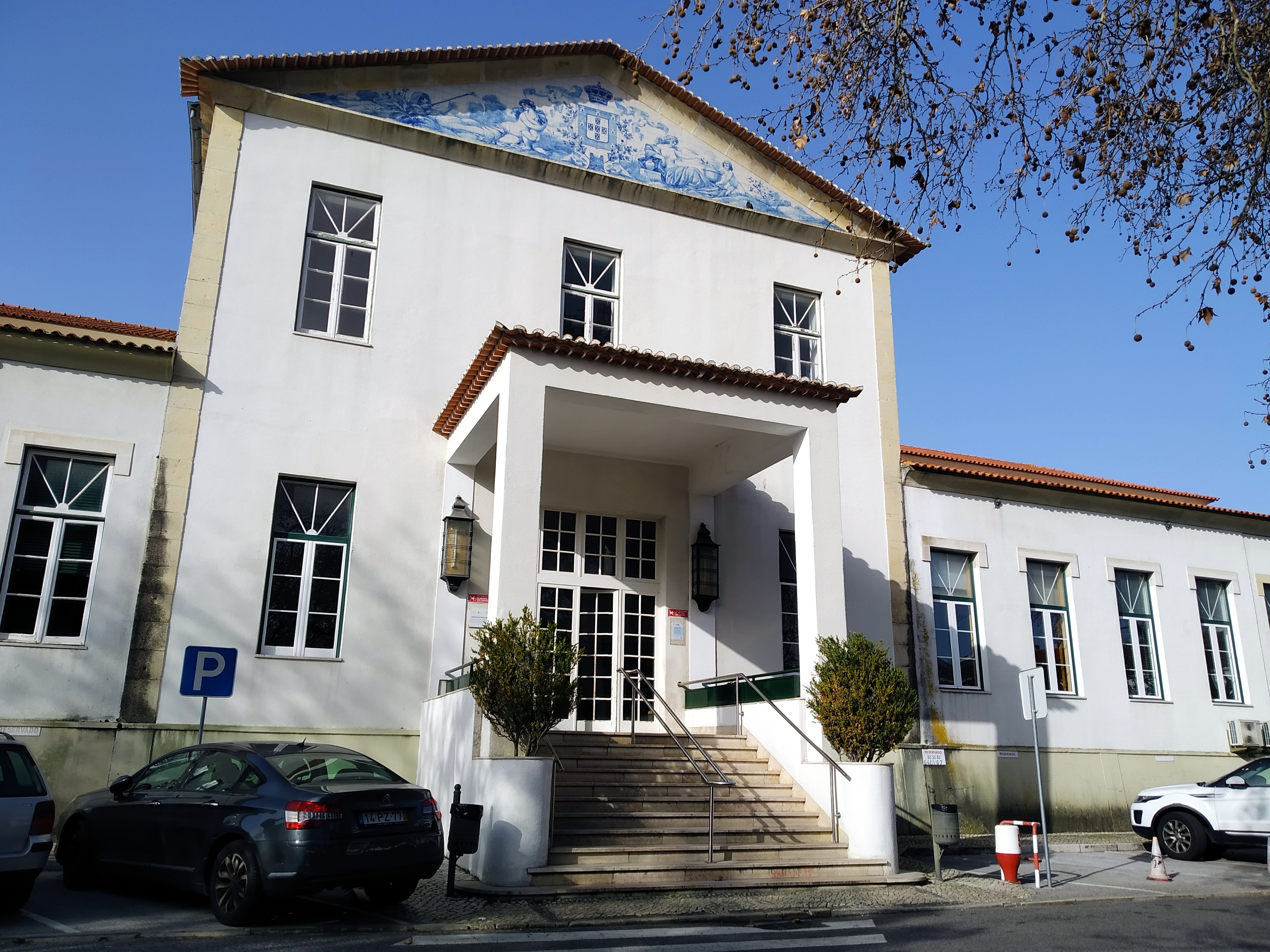

- Location of the hospital within the municipality of Lisbon

General information
- Type: Hospital
- Location: Lumiar, Lisbon, Portugal
- Coordinates: 38°45′56″N 9°9′32.4″W
- Owner: Portuguese Republic

Technical details
- Material: Mixed masonry

Design and construction
- Architect: Vasco Morais Palmeiro Regaleira

Hospital Pulido Valente is a hospital located in the civil parish of Lumiar, in the Portuguese municipality of Lisbon. The hospital is dedicated mainly to Pulmonary care medicine, being the biggest hospital of this speciality in Portugal.

== History ==
A plan by architectural landscaper Francisco Caldeira Cabral and an architectural project authored by Vasco Morais Palmeiro Regaleira was established in 1947. The DGEMN Direcção Geral dos Edifícios e Monumentos Nacionais (General Directorate for Buildings and National Monuments) was involved in public works between 25 April 1928 and 27 April 1953 resulting in the expansion, remodeling and adaption of the hospital.

As part of these plans, in 1951, construction began on a preventorium and re-organization of the operating block, by the Direcções dos Serviços de Construção e Conservação (Directorates for Construction and Conservation Services). Five years later, construction began on an experimental pavilion, that included 60 beds, in addition to conservation projects and work on the kitchen by the Directorates. The following year work began on the first wing of a new sanitorium, which continued in the next year. The completed work included the completion of a crematorium, the execution of the a major part of the civil construction work, remodeling and expansion of the Radiology Services and sanitarium's Surgery block. Work began on the Serviços Industriais (Industrial Service) block, that included laboratory, pharmacy services, and deposits; installation of the distribution channels for electricity to many of the buildings, including transformation post, along with accesses and exterior landscaping. In addition, the chapel in the sanitorium was refurbished.

In 1959, equipment and furniture were installed for the satellite unit of the sanitorium, by the Comissão para Aquisição de Mobiliário (Furniture Acquisition Commission).

In 1961, during phase two of the public project, saw expansion of pathological anatomy block, cardiology and operator rooms, improvements of the central heating and conservation work on the Lambert de Morais Pavilion, by the Serviços de Construção e de Conservação.

The extinction of the Pulmonary Emergency block, after a political decision in 1997, left the hospital without the possibility of using a specialized facility. The crisis in the Pulmonary Care Medicine Department, resulted in a reduction of staff and the exit of junior physicians caused by the restructuring in the National Health Care System in 2003.

On 24 August 2006, the building was undergoing heritage classification, under the terms of the transitional regime, under Article 1.1 of Decree 173/2006 (Diário da República, Série 1, 16), but it expired before the limits of Article 24, Decree 107/2001 (Diário da República, Série-1A, 209) on 8 September 2001.
