= Ângela Mendonça Ribeiro =

Brazilian diver

Ângela Ribeiro
Personal information
- Full name: Ângela Mendonça Ribeiro
- Born: 27 February 1962 (age 63); São Paulo, Brazil

Sport
- Sport: Diving

Ângela Mendonça Ribeiro (born 27 February 1962) is a Brazilian diver. She competed at the 1984 Summer Olympics and the 1988 Summer Olympics.
