= Irena Milnikiel =

Polish swimmer

Personal information
- Nationality: Polish
- Born: 8 December 1933 Skarżysko-Kamienna, Poland
- Died: 12 January 1989 (aged 55) Warsaw, Poland

Sport
- Sport: Swimming

Irena Milnikiel (8 December 1933 – 12 January 1989) was a Polish swimmer. She competed in the women's 400 metre freestyle at the 1952 Summer Olympics.
