= Broadway Federal Bank =

Bank based in Los Angeles, California, US

- Type: Public
- Traded as: Nasdaq: BYFC
- Industry: Banking
- Founded: 1946; 80 years ago
- Defunct: 2020
- Headquarters: Los Angeles, California, US
- Key people: Wayne-Kent A. Bradshaw (president CEO); Virgil Roberts (chairman of the board of Directors)
- Number of employees: 65
- Website: www.cityfirstbank.com

Broadway Federal Bank was a community focused bank founded in 1946 and based in Los Angeles. As of 2020, it had three traditional branches and one loan production office.

It was the last remaining traditionally black-community oriented bank headquartered west of Dallas.

On August 26, 2020, its parent company, Broadway Financial Corporation, announced a merger with DC-based City First Bank to form the largest Black-led financial institution in the US, with over a billion dollars in assets.

== History ==
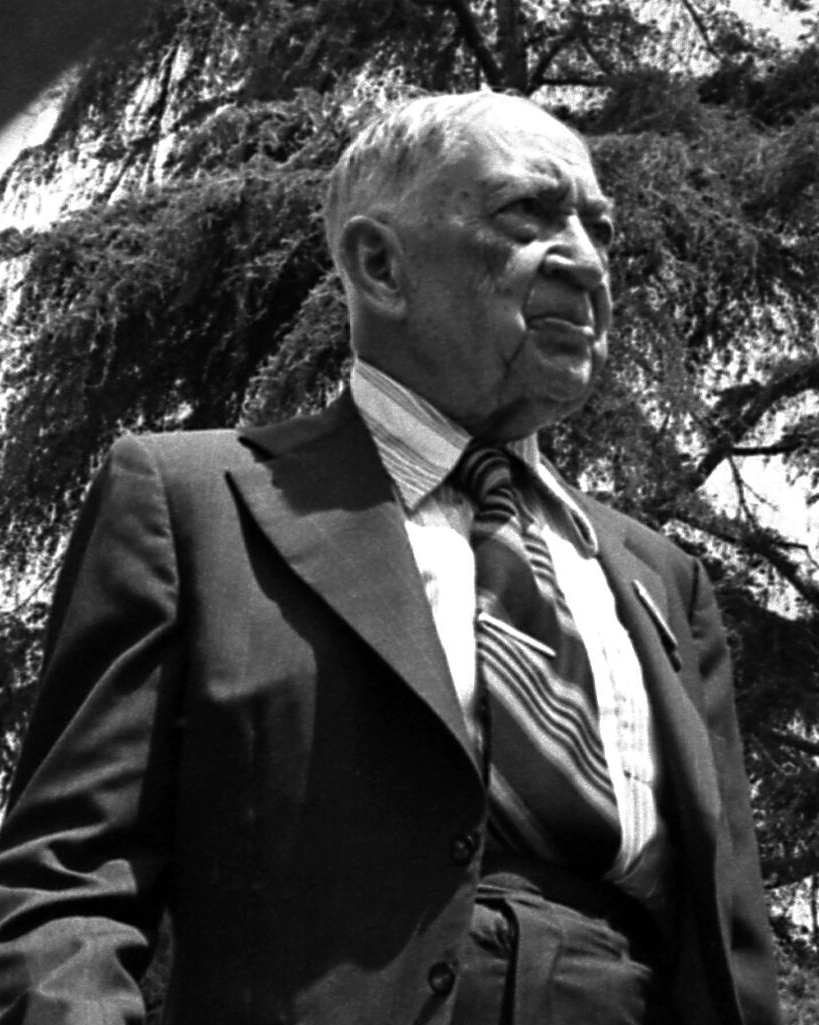
H. Claude Hudson

In 1946, Broadway Federal Savings and Loan Association was founded by a group of civic minded people to provide bank services to minorities in the greater Los Angeles area, who were not being serviced by any of the existing financial institutions.

The bank received its charter on November 26, 1946 with an initial investment of $150,000. It opened for business in a three-room office on 4329 South Broadway on January 11, 1947.

Real estate broker and investor H. A. Howard served as the first president of the company until September 1949 when Dr. H. Claude Hudson, investor, community activist and dentist, took over leadership. The savings and loan grew rapidly under Chairman of the Board Hudson’s supervision. In 1954, Broadway Federal acquired a larger building at Broadway and 45th Street, which was redesigned by renowned architect Paul Williams, who was also a founding board member.

Broadway Federal grew to become the second largest black-owned bank in the United States. In 1966, its branch expansion began with a location in the Mid-Town area of Los Angeles. This branch was also designed by Paul Williams.

In 1972, Dr. Hudson retired from active management of Broadway Federal and his son, Elbert T. Hudson, an attorney, community activist and long-time board member was selected as board chairman and CEO. Elbert T. Hudson served as CEO until March 1992, when his son, Paul C. Hudson, also an attorney and community activist took over.

Shortly after Paul C. Hudson’s appointment as CEO, a fire destroyed Broadway Federal’s main branch during the civil unrest that occurred in the wake of Rodney King beating trial verdict. Despite this setback, management reaffirmed its commitment to the community.

In December 1995, Broadway began its conversion from a mutual savings and loan to a stock savings bank. The IPO raised close to $9 million. Broadway Financial Corporation is the parent holding company of what is now known as Broadway Federal Bank. Broadway Financial is publicly traded on the NASDAQ market as (symbol: BYFC).

The company is currently managed by Wayne-Kent A. Bradshaw, who joined the Bank as President and Chief Operating Officer in 2009, and became Chief Executive Officer of the Company and the Bank in 2012. Under Mr. Bradshaw’s leadership, Broadway has continued its focus on serving low-to-moderate income communities, with a particular focus on lending for multi-family housing. This focus addresses the chronic need for affordable housing that exists throughout all of Southern California, especially for those families living within low-to-moderate income communities. The Bank also offers a variety of other residential and commercial real estate loan products for consumers, businesses, and non-profit organizations, other loan products, and a variety of deposit products, including checking, savings and money market accounts, certificates of deposits and retirement accounts.

== Loan officer kickback scandal ==
In 2014, a former Broadway Federal Bank loan officer pled guilty in a scheme to receive kickbacks from brokers for processing unqualified church mortgage applications. Broadway would normally pay a discount rebate to brokers who brought loans to the bank. From 2007 to 2010, he "demanded from the brokers that all or part of that rebate amount be paid to him." According to the Department of Justice, the scheme netted the loan officer $350,000, and caused losses to the bank of at least $4.2 million. However, after the officer's sentencing in 2016, the bank's CEO revealed that $90M church loans were originated by the loan officer, many of which were fraudulent, and could have caused losses as high as $30 million.

The bank stopped processing church loans in 2010, and subsequently has reduced the portfolio of its mortgages to churches to a small percentage of its assets.

Due in part of the losses incurred by the bad loans, the bank received a $15 million loan from the Troubled Asset Relief Program (TARP), which the Treasury Department converted into shares of the bank's stock in 2013, making it the largest single shareholder until 2020.

== Attempted hostile takeover ==
In February 2020, Steven A. Sugarman, the former CEO of Banc of California, attempted to take over Broadway Federal with an unsolicited bid. He had previously purchased the remaining portfolio of Broadway's stock from the Treasury Department under his business Sugarman Enterprises, and assigned it to his subsidiary business The Capital Corps LLC, making him the bank's biggest shareholder, with 1.8 million (9.6%) of the outstanding stock.

On June 19 (Juneteenth), 2020 due to increased interest and online activism promoting black businesses, the stock price of the bank went up over 300%, to a historic high of $7.23. Afterwards, Sugarman revealed that he would no longer pursue a buy-out, after selling his entire stake in the bank for an average of $2.59 per share.

== Merger with City First Bank ==
On August 26, 2020, Broadway Financial Corp announced it would be combining with CFBanc Corporation, based in Washington, DC in a "transformational merger of equals" which would create the largest Black-led Minority Depository Institution in the US, with over $1B in assets. The merger was unanimously approved by the Boards of both banks, and expected to be completed during the first quarter of 2021. The combined bank would keep the current bi-coastal headquarters, with an aim to expand into other urban regions.

CFBanc's current President and CEO Brian E. Argrett will take over the reins as CEO of the merged institution, with Broadway's CEO, Wayne-Kent Bradshaw serving as the new Chairman of the Board of Directors.
