= Ross Sutherland (footballer) =

Australian rules footballer

Personal information
- Full name: Ross Sutherland
- Born: 4 August 1937
- Died: 4 January 1989 (aged 51)
- Original team: Colac
- Height: 183 cm (6 ft 0 in)
- Weight: 81 kg (179 lb)

Playing career^{1}
Years	Club	Games (Goals)
1958	Geelong	2 (0)
- ^{1} Playing statistics correct to the end of 1958.

Ross Sutherland (4 August 1937 – 4 January 1989) was an Australian rules footballer who played with Geelong in the Victorian Football League (VFL).
