= Bobby McCain =

American football player (born 1993)

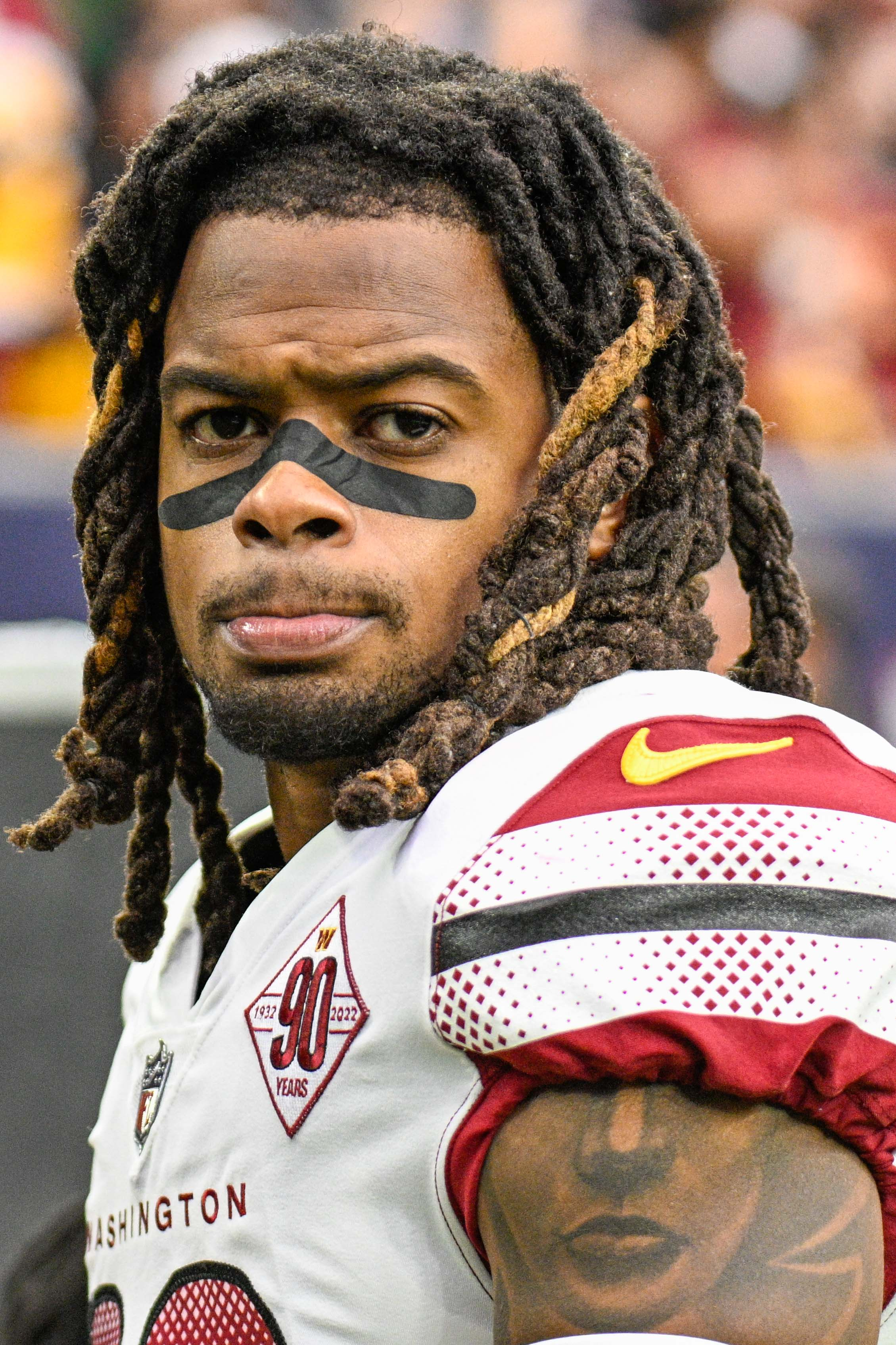
- McCain with the Washington Commanders in 2022

Profile
- Position: Safety

Personal information
- Born: August 18, 1993 (age 33); Sylacauga, Alabama, U.S.
- Listed height: 5 ft 9 in (1.75 m)
- Listed weight: 196 lb (89 kg)

Career information
- High school: Oxford (Oxford, Alabama)
- College: Memphis (2011–2014)
- NFL draft: 2015: 5th round, 145th overall pick

Career history
- Miami Dolphins (2015–2020); Washington Football Team / Commanders (2021–2022); New York Giants (2023); Minnesota Vikings (2024)

Awards and highlights
- First-team All-AAC (2014)

Career NFL statistics as of 2024
- Total tackles: 398
- Sacks: 4
- Pass deflections: 45
- Interceptions: 11
- Forced fumbles: 2
- Defensive touchdowns: 1
- Stats at Pro Football Reference

Bobby Marcellous McCain (born August 18, 1993) is an American professional football safety. He played college football for the Memphis Tigers and was drafted by the Miami Dolphins in the fifth round of the 2015 NFL draft. McCain has also played for the Washington Football Team / Commanders and New York Giants.

== Early life ==
McCain was born on August 18, 1993, in Sylacauga, Alabama. He attended Oxford High School, where he played football. McCain was considered a three-star recruit by Rivals.com and was listed as the No. 36 prospect from the state of Alabama in 2011. He committed to Memphis to play college football over offers from Auburn, Kentucky, Mississippi State, and Tennessee, among others.

== College career ==
McCain played his college career at the University of Memphis where he was a four-year starter at and had 12 career interceptions, including 11 in his final two years.

=== Statistics ===
Season	GP	Tackles					Interceptions					Fumbles			
Season	GP	Cmb	Solo	Ast	TfL	Sck	Int	Yds	Avg	TD	PD	FF	FR	Yds	TD
2011	11	29	23	6	1	0	1	79	79	1	4	1	0	0	0
2012	12	31	23	8	3	1	0	0	0	0	0	0	0	0	0
2013	9	25	21	4	1.5	0	6	108	18	2	4	1	1	0	0
2014	13	46	38	8	1	0	5	59	11.8	1	3	0	1	59	1
Career	45	131	105	26	6.5	1	12	246	20.5	4	11	2	2	59	1

== Professional career ==
External videos
- Bobby McCain's NFL Combine Workout

Pre-draft measurables
Height	Weight	Arm length	Hand span	40-yard dash	10-yard split	20-yard split	20-yard shuttle	Three-cone drill	Vertical jump	Broad jump	Bench press
5 ft 9 1/2 in (1.77 m)	195 lb (88 kg)	30 1/2 in (0.77 m)	9 in (0.23 m)	4.51 s	1.59 s	2.63 s	3.82 s	6.80 s	36 in (0.91 m)	10 ft 10 in (3.30 m)	17 reps

=== Miami Dolphins ===
==== 2015 ====
The Miami Dolphins selected McCain in the fifth round with the 145th overall pick in the 2015 NFL draft. McCain was the 18th cornerback drafted in 2015. On May 7, 2015, the Dolphins signed McCain to a four-year, $2.50 million contract that includes a signing bonus of $228,288.

Throughout training camp, McCain competed to be a starting cornerback against Jamar Taylor, Tony Lippett, Brice McCain, and Will Davis. Head coach Joe Philbin named McCain the fourth cornerback on the depth chart to begin the regular season, behind Brent Grimes, Taylor, and Davis.

He made his professional regular season debut in the Dolphins season-opening 17–10 win at the Washington Redskins. On October 5, 2015, the Dolphins fired head coach Joe Philbin after they began the season with a 1–3 record. Tight ends coach Dan Campbell was named the interim head coach for the remainder of the season. On December 6, 2015, he collected a season-high seven solo tackles and deflected a pass in the Dolphins' 15–13 victory against the Baltimore Ravens in Week 13. He finished his rookie season in 2015 with 28 combined tackles (23 solo) and four pass deflections in 16 games and four starts.

==== 2016 ====
On January 9, 2016, the Dolphins hired Chicago Bears offensive coordinator Adam Gase as their new head coach. McCain entered training camp as the first-team nickelback, but saw competition for his role from Jordan Lucas and Tyler Patmon. Head coach Adam Gase named McCain the third cornerback on the Dolphins' depth chart to begin the regular season, behind Byron Maxwell and rookie Xavien Howard. He was also named the first-team nickelback.

On September 29, 2016, McCain recorded four combined tackles, deflected a pass, and made his first career sack on Andy Dalton during a 22–7 loss at the Cincinnati Bengals. On November 6, 2016, McCain recorded three solo tackles, broke up a pass, and made his first career interception in the Dolphins' 27–23 win against the New York Jets in Week 9. McCain intercepted a pass by New York Jets' quarterback Ryan Fitzpatrick, that was originally intended for tight end Austin Seferian-Jenkins, and returned it for a 17-yard gain in the third quarter. In Week 12, he collected a season-high five combined tackles and broke up one pass during a 31–24 victory against the San Francisco 49ers in Week 12. He finished the 2016 NFL season with 45 combined tackles (32 solo), six pass deflections, one interception, one sack, and a forced fumble in 16 games and eight starts.

The Dolphins finished second in the AFC East with a 10–6 record and earned a Wild Card berth. On January 8, 2017, McCain started in his first career playoff game and recorded two tackles as the Dolphins lost the AFC wild card game 30–12 at the Pittsburgh Steelers.

==== 2017 ====
On January 12, 2017, the Dolphins announced their decision to promote linebackers coach Matt Burke to defensive coordinator after Vance Joseph accepted the head coaching position with the Denver Broncos. During training camp, McCain competed to retain his position at nickelback against Tony Lippett, Michael Thomas, Cordrea Tankersley, Alterraun Verner, Jordan Lucas, and Lafayette Pitts. Head coach Adam Gase named McCain the first-team nickelback to start the season, behind Byron Maxwell and Xavien Howard.

On November 26, 2017, during Week 12 against the New England Patriots, McCain was ejected for throwing a punch at wide receiver Danny Amendola. In Week 16, he collected a season-high eight combined tackles and broke up a pass during a 29–13 loss at the Kansas City Chiefs. McCain finished the season with 48 combined tackles (36 solo), seven pass deflections, two interceptions, and a sack in 16 games and seven starts.

==== 2018 ====
On June 1, 2018, McCain signed a four-year, $27 million contract extension with the Dolphins with $13 million guaranteed. During training camp, McCain competed to be a starting cornerback against Cordrea Tankersley. Head coach Adam Gase named McCain and Xavien Howard the starting cornerbacks to begin the regular season in 2018. Overall, McCain finished the 2018 season with 61 total tackles, two sacks, one interception, and five passes defended.

==== 2019 ====
In Week 3 against the Dallas Cowboys, McCain recorded his first interception of the season off Dak Prescott in the 31–6 loss. On November 20, 2019, McCain was placed on injured reserve, ending his season. In nine games, he finished with 25 total tackles, two interceptions, and three passes defended.

==== 2020 ====
In the 2020 season, McCain played in all 16 regular season games, of which he started 15. He finished with 46 total tackles, one interception, and five passes defended. McCain was released by the Dolphins on May 6, 2021.

=== Washington Football Team / Commanders ===
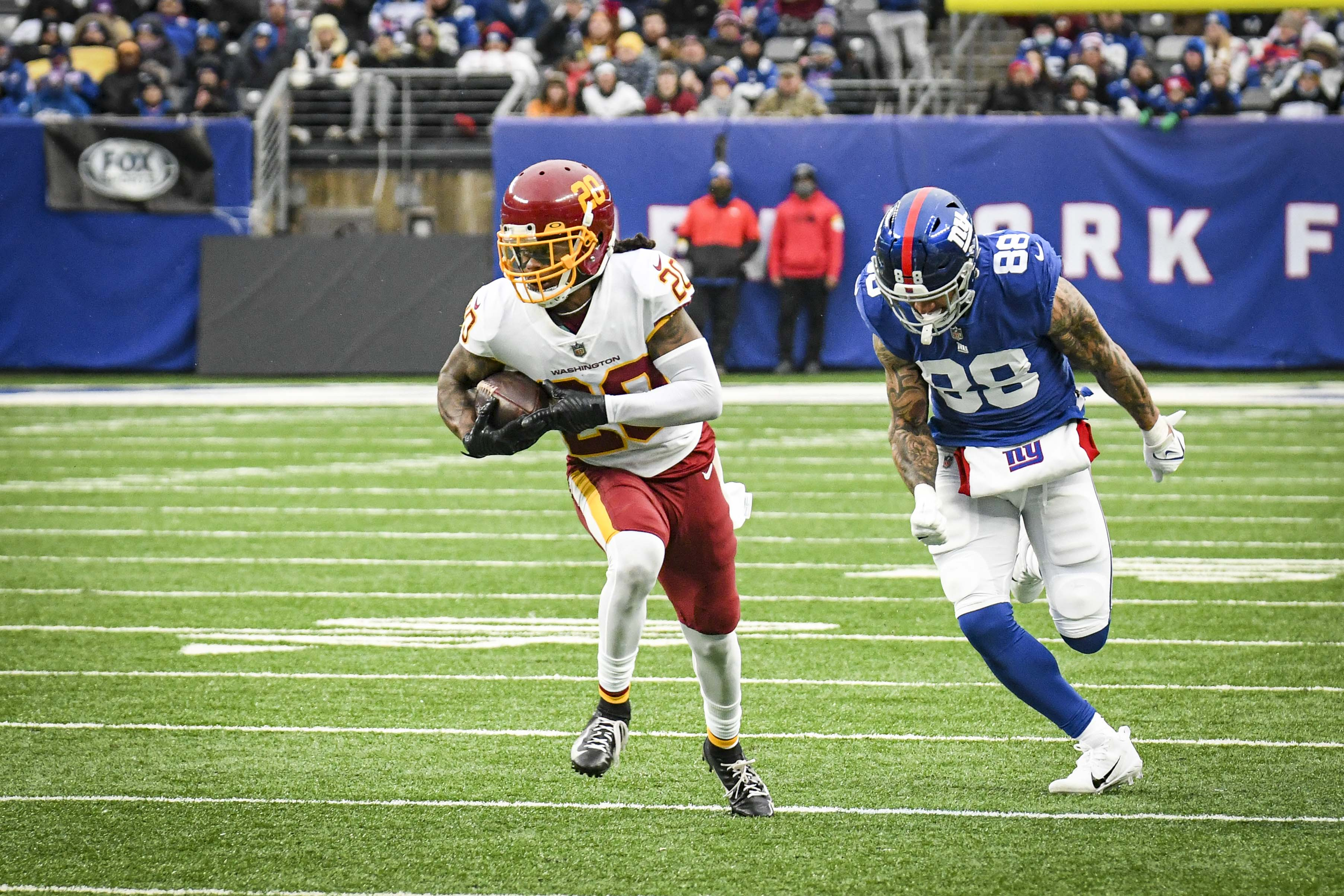
McCain with an interception against the New York Giants in 2021

McCain signed a one-year contract with the Washington Football Team on May 17, 2021. McCain recorded his first interception of the season against Kansas City Chiefs quarterback Patrick Mahomes in Week 6. In the Week 10 win over the Tampa Bay Buccaneers, McCain intercepted Tom Brady in the first half of the game. He recorded two interceptions against New York Giants quarterback Jake Fromm in the final game of the season and returned one of them for his first career touchdown. In the 2021 season, McCain appeared in 17 games and started 16. He finished with 63 total tackles, four interceptions, and nine passes defended.

McCain re-signed with the team on a two-year, $11 million contract on March 17, 2022. McCain would play slot cornerback later in the season. In the 2022 season, McCain appeared in all 17 games and started 16. He finished with 76 total tackles, five passes defended, and one forced fumble. He was released on February 27, 2023.

=== New York Giants ===
On March 23, 2023, McCain signed a one-year contract with the Giants. He was waived on December 17, 2023.

=== Minnesota Vikings ===
On July 29, 2024, McCain signed with the Minnesota Vikings. He was released on August 27, and re-signed to the practice squad.

== NFL career statistics ==
Legend
**Bold**	Career high

=== Regular season ===
Year	Team	Games		Tackles					Interceptions					Fumbles			
Year	Team	GP	GS	Cmb	Solo	Ast	Sck	TFL	Int	Yds	TD	Lng	PD	FF	FR	Yds	TD
2015	MIA	16	4	28	23	5	0.0	0	0	0	0	0	4	0	0	0	0
2016	MIA	16	8	46	33	13	1.0	**3**	1	0	0	0	6	**1**	0	0	0
2017	MIA	16	7	48	36	12	1.0	**3**	2	6	0	6	7	0	0	0	0
2018	MIA	14	13	61	50	11	**2.0**	**3**	1	0	0	0	5	0	0	0	0
2019	MIA	9	8	25	19	6	0.0	0	2	53	0	**32**	3	0	0	0	0
2020	MIA	16	15	46	39	7	0.0	0	1	19	0	19	5	0	0	0	0
2021	WAS	**17**	**16**	63	47	16	0.0	0	**4**	**63**	**1**	30	**9**	0	0	0	0
2022	WAS	**17**	**16**	**76**	**54**	**22**	0.0	**3**	0	0	0	0	5	**1**	0	0	0
2023	NYG	10	0	1	1	0	0.0	0	0	0	0	0	1	0	0	0	0
		131	87	394	302	92	4.0	12	11	141	1	32	45	2	0	0	0

=== Playoffs ===
Year	Team	Games		Tackles					Interceptions					Fumbles			
Year	Team	GP	GS	Cmb	Solo	Ast	Sck	TFL	Int	Yds	TD	Lng	PD	FF	FR	Yds	TD
2016	MIA	**1**	**1**	**2**	0	**2**	0.0	0	0	0	0	0	0	0	0	0	0
		1	1	2	0	2	0.0	0	0	0	0	0	0	0	0	0	0
