= 2016 Miami Dolphins season =

51st season in franchise history

- Owner: Stephen M. Ross
- General manager: Chris Grier
- Head coach: Adam Gase
- Home stadium: Hard Rock Stadium

Results
- Record: 10–6
- Division place: 2nd AFC East
- Playoffs: Lost Wild Card Playoffs (at Steelers) 12–30
- All-Pros: 2: EDGE Cameron Wake (2nd team); DL Ndamukong Suh (2nd team)
- Pro Bowlers: 4: DT Ndamukong Suh; DE Cameron Wake; WR Jarvis Landry; RB Jay Ajayi

Uniform
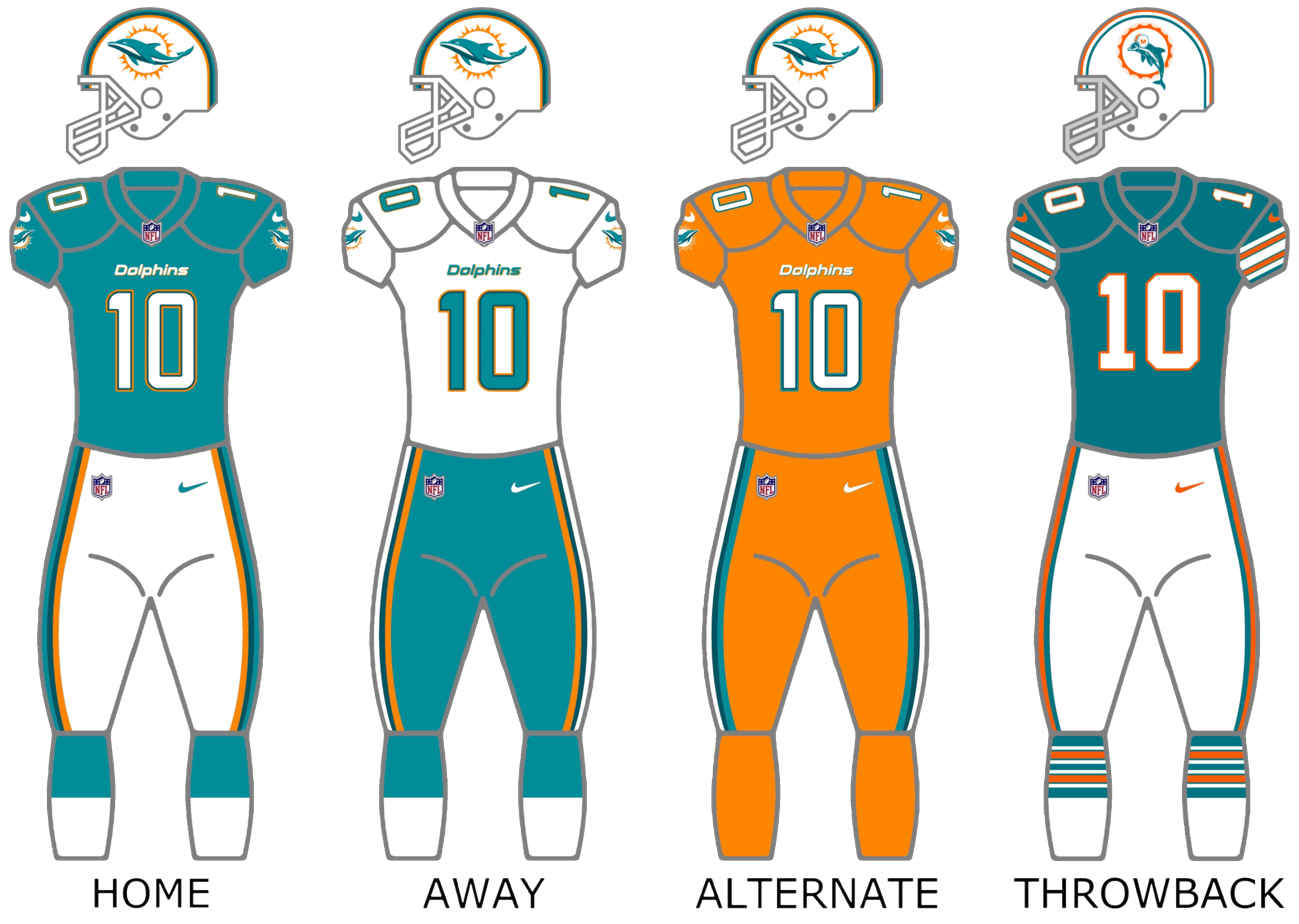

The 2016 season was the Miami Dolphins' 47th in the National Football League (NFL), their 51st overall, their first under general manager Chris Grier and their first under head coach Adam Gase. The season saw the Dolphins trying to improve upon their 6–10 record from 2015. After a lackluster 1–4 start, the Dolphins claimed six straight wins, ultimately finishing the season on a 9–2 run. With their Week 15 win over the New York Jets, the Dolphins clinched a winning record for the first time since 2008, and clinched a playoff berth the following week after the Kansas City Chiefs defeated the Denver Broncos, ending their 8-year playoff drought. This made Gase the Dolphins' first rookie coach since Tony Sparano to end a year-long playoff drought and also lead them to a winning record of at least 10 wins. They were also the first AFC East team, other than the New England Patriots, to qualify for the postseason since the 2010 New York Jets. However, they were defeated by the Pittsburgh Steelers in the Wild Card round, ending their season and not winning a playoff game for the 16th straight year.

== Offseason ==
=== Organizational changes ===
On January 2, 2016, two-year general manager Dennis Hickey was fired. On January 4, the Dolphins promoted director of college scouting Chris Grier to replace Hickey as the new general manager. Grier has been with the Dolphins for the past sixteen seasons, nine as the director of scouting.

The Dolphins front office, which is made up of owner Stephen Ross, executive vice president of football operations Mike Tannenbaum, CEO Tom Garfinkel, vice chairman Matt Higgins and Grier, developed a committee to find a permanent replacement for former head coach Joe Philbin, who was fired and replaced by tight ends coach Dan Campbell on October 5, 2015.

The Dolphins conducted interviews with seven candidates. The candidates included former Atlanta Falcons head coach Mike Smith, former Washington Redskins and Denver Broncos head coach Mike Shanahan, former Buffalo Bills head coach Doug Marrone, Bills assistant head coach Anthony Lynn, Chicago Bears offensive coordinator Adam Gase, Detroit Lions defensive coordinator Teryl Austin and interim head coach Campbell. The Dolphins requested interviews with New England Patriots offensive coordinator Josh McDaniels and defensive coordinator Matt Patricia, as well as Cincinnati Bengals offensive coordinator Hue Jackson.

Owner Ross expressed interest in New Orleans Saints head coach Sean Payton; however, on January 6, Payton announced he would remain in New Orleans for another season.

On January 9, Gase was hired as the twelfth head coach in Dolphins history. He was the only candidate to receive a second interview. On January 12, Gase hired Bengals' defensive back coach Vance Joseph as defensive coordinator and linebackers coach Matt Burke, who worked with Joseph in Cincinnati, in the same position. Gase also hired Washington Redskins' offensive line assistant Shane Day as tight ends coach, San Francisco 49ers' offensive line coach Chris Foerster in the same position and former NFL wide receiver Shawn Jefferson as the wide receivers coach. Assistant general manager Eric Stokes was promoted to senior personnel executive.

On August 16, 2016, the Dolphins announced the naming rights to their home stadium had been sold to Hard Rock International. The stadium, which was known as Sun Life Stadium in 2015 and was being called "New Miami Stadium" during the $500 million renovations completed during the summer of 2016, will be known as "Hard Rock Stadium."

=== Roster changes ===
The Dolphins entered free agency with 11 unrestricted free agents.

Position	Player	Free agency tag	Date signed	2016 team
QB	Matt Moore	UFA	March 15, 2016	Miami Dolphins
RB	Lamar Miller	UFA	March 9, 2016	Houston Texans
C	Jacques McClendon	UFA	March 11, 2016	Miami Dolphins
G	Shelley Smith	UFA	August 13, 2016	Chicago Bears
WR	Rishard Matthews	UFA	March 9, 2016	Tennessee Titans
DE	Derrick Shelby	UFA	March 9, 2016	Atlanta Falcons
DE	Olivier Vernon	UFA	March 9, 2016	New York Giants
LB	James-Michael Johnson	UFA	March 10, 2016	Miami Dolphins
LB	Spencer Paysinger	UFA	March 29, 2016	Miami Dolphins
LB	Kelvin Sheppard	UFA	April 10, 2016	New York Giants
FS	Louis Delmas	UFA		
RFA: Restricted free agent, UFA: Unrestricted free agent, ERFA: Exclusive rights free agent LEGEND – Light green background indicates a player has been re-signed by the Dolphins. – Light red background indicates a player has departed the Dolphins.

==== Acquisitions ====
The Dolphins first addition of 2016 was the signing of wide receiver/cornerback Tyler Davis on January 4, on a futures contract. Davis became the first German Football League player to be signed by an NFL team.

March 7, 2016 – The Dolphins acquire LB Kiko Alonso and CB Byron Maxwell from the Philadelphia Eagles in exchange for swapping first round picks (8 and 13).

March 8, 2016 – The Dolphins sign DE Mario Williams on a 2-year, $16 million contract.

March 9, 2016 – The Dolphins sign S Isa Abdul-Quddus on a 3-year, $12.75 million contract.

May 13, 2016 – The Dolphins sign DE Jason Jones on a 1-year, $1.5 million contract.

==== Departures ====
The Dolphins first departure of 2016 was the waiving of offensive tackle Jason Curtis Fox, who had one year remaining on his contract, on January 12.

The Dolphins also released cornerback Brent Grimes and wide receiver Greg Jennings on March 5, 2016 after an uneventful 2015 season.

On March 9, the Dolphins lost Olivier Vernon, Lamar Miller, Derrick Shelby, Kelvin Sheppard, and Rishard Matthews to other teams during free agency.

== Draft ==
2016 Miami Dolphins Draft
Round	Selection	Player	Position	College
1	13	Laremy Tunsil	OT	Ole Miss
2	38	Xavien Howard	CB	Baylor
3	73	Kenyan Drake	RB	Alabama
3	86	Leonte Carroo	WR	Rutgers
6	186	Jakeem Grant	WR	Texas Tech
6	204	Jordan Lucas	CB/S	Penn State
7	223	Brandon Doughty	QB	Western Kentucky
7	231	Thomas Duarte	TE	UCLA

Notes

- The team traded its first-round selection to the Philadelphia Eagles in exchange for a first-round selection, cornerback Byron Maxwell and linebacker Kiko Alonso.
- The Baltimore Ravens traded its second-round selection to Miami in exchange for Miami's second and fourth-round selections.
- Miami traded its fifth-round selection to the New England Patriots in exchange for New England's 2 sixth-round selections and a seventh-round selection.
- The Dolphins acquired an additional seventh-round selection in a trade that sent cornerback Will Davis to the Baltimore Ravens.

== Staff ==
2016 Miami Dolphins staff
Front office: Chairman/managing general partner – Stephen Ross; Vice chairman/partner – Jorge Perez; Vice chairman – Don Shula; President/CEO – Tom Garfinkel; General manager – Chris Grier; Executive vice president of football operations – Mike Tannenbaum; Executive vice president of football administration – Dawn Aponte; Senior director, football administration – Brandon Shore; Director, player personnel – Joe Schoen; Director, college scouting – Adam Engroff; Director, pro personnel – Anthony Hunt; Football research analyst – Brian Fleury; Head coaches: Head coach – Adam Gase; Assistant head coach/special teams coordinator – Darren Rizzi; Offensive coaches: Offensive coordinator – Clyde Christensen; Quarterbacks – Bo Hardegree; Running backs – Danny Barrett; Wide receivers – Shawn Jefferson; Assistant wide receivers – Ben Johnson; Tight ends – Shane Day; Offensive line – Chris Foerster; Assistant offensive line – Jeremiah Washburn; Offensive quality control – Chris Kuper	Defensive coaches: Defensive coordinator – Vance Joseph; Defensive line – Terrell Williams; Linebackers – Matt Burke; Assistant linebackers – Charlie Bullen; Defensive backs – Lou Anarumo; Assistant defensive backs – Daronte Jones; Senior defensive assistant/pass rush specialist – Jim Washburn; Defensive quality control – Rusty McKinney; Special teams coaches: Assistant special teams – Marwan Maalouf; Strength and conditioning: Head strength and conditioning – Dave Puloka; Assistant strength and conditioning – Jim Arthur; Assistant strength and conditioning – Ted Rath

== Final roster ==
2016 Miami Dolphins roster
Quarterbacks (QB): 8 Matt Moore; 17 Ryan Tannehill; 16 T. J. Yates; Running backs (RB): 23 Jay Ajayi; 32 Kenyan Drake; 26 Damien Williams; Wide receivers (WR): 88 Leonte Carroo; 19 Jakeem Grant; 14 Jarvis Landry; 11 DeVante Parker; 87 Rashawn Scott; 10 Kenny Stills; Tight ends (TE): 83 Thomas Duarte; 48 MarQueis Gray; 85 Dominique Jones; 80 Dion Sims	Offensive linemen (OL): 76 Branden Albert T; 64 Jake Brendel C; 74 Jermon Bushrod G; 70 Ja'Wuan James T; 65 Anthony Steen C; 67 Laremy Tunsil T; 60 Kraig Urbik C; 79 Sam Young T; Defensive linemen (DL): 50 Andre Branch DE; 78 Terrence Fede DE; 98 Jason Jones DE; 90 Earl Mitchell DT; 97 Jordan Phillips DT; 93 Ndamukong Suh DT; 91 Cameron Wake DE; 94 Mario Williams DE; 75 Nick Williams DT	Linebackers (LB): 47 Kiko Alonso MLB; 56 Donald Butler OLB; 46 Neville Hewitt OLB; 45 Mike Hull MLB; 53 Jelani Jenkins OLB; 42 Spencer Paysinger OLB; 57 Trevor Reilly OLB; Defensive backs (DB): 35 Walt Aikens SS; 37 A. J. Hendy SS; 25 Xavien Howard CB; 36 Tony Lippett CB; 21 Jordan Lucas SS; 41 Byron Maxwell CB; 28 Bobby McCain CB; 40 Lafayette Pitts CB; 30 Bacarri Rambo FS; 31 Michael Thomas FS; Special teams (ST): 4 Matt Darr P; 92 John Denney LS; 3 Andrew Franks K	Practice squad: 49 Lamin Barrow MLB; 43 Bené Benwikere CB; 15 Da'Ron Brown WR; 77 Jesse Davis T; 6 Brandon Doughty QB; 27 Storm Johnson RB; 34 Senorise Perry RB; 69 Terry Poole T; 73 Julius Warmsley DE; 58 Brandon Watts OLB; Reserve: 24 Isa Abdul-Quddus SS (IR); 84 Jordan Cameron TE (IR); 38 Chimdi Chekwa CB (IR); 33 Ifo Ekpre-Olomu CB (IR); 20 Reshad Jones SS (IR); 95 Dion Jordan DE (NF-Inj.); 55 Koa Misi OLB (IR); 51 Mike Pouncey C (IR); Rookies in italics 53 active, 8 reserve, 10 practice squad

== Schedule ==
=== Preseason ===
This was the first preseason since 1999 that the Dolphins did not play the Tampa Bay Buccaneers.

Week	Date	Opponent	Result	Record	Venue	Recap
1	August 12	at New York Giants	**W** 27–10	1–0	MetLife Stadium	Recap
2	August 19	at Dallas Cowboys	**L** 14–41	1–1	AT&T Stadium	Recap
3	August 25	Atlanta Falcons	**W** 17–6	2–1	Camping World Stadium (Orlando)	Recap
4	September 1	Tennessee Titans	**L** 10–21	2–2	Hard Rock Stadium	Recap

=== Regular season ===
Week	Date	Opponent	Result	Record	Venue	Recap
1	September 11	at Seattle Seahawks	**L** 10–12	0–1	CenturyLink Field	Recap
2	September 18	at **New England Patriots**	**L** 24–31	0–2	Gillette Stadium	Recap
3	September 25	Cleveland Browns	**W** 30–24 (OT)	1–2	Hard Rock Stadium	Recap
4	September 29	at Cincinnati Bengals	**L** 7–22	1–3	Paul Brown Stadium	Recap
5	October 9	Tennessee Titans	**L** 17–30	1–4	Hard Rock Stadium	Recap
6	October 16	Pittsburgh Steelers	**W** 30–15	2–4	Hard Rock Stadium	Recap
7	October 23	**Buffalo Bills**	**W** 28–25	3–4	Hard Rock Stadium	Recap
8	Bye					
9	November 6	**New York Jets**	**W** 27–23	4–4	Hard Rock Stadium	Recap
10	November 13	at San Diego Chargers	**W** 31–24	5–4	Qualcomm Stadium	Recap
11	November 20	at Los Angeles Rams	**W** 14–10	6–4	Los Angeles Memorial Coliseum	Recap
12	November 27	San Francisco 49ers	**W** 31–24	7–4	Hard Rock Stadium	Recap
13	December 4	at Baltimore Ravens	**L** 6–38	7–5	M&T Bank Stadium	Recap
14	December 11	Arizona Cardinals	**W** 26–23	8–5	Hard Rock Stadium	Recap
15	December 17	at **New York Jets**	**W** 34–13	9–5	MetLife Stadium	Recap
16	December 24	at **Buffalo Bills**	**W** 34–31 (OT)	10–5	New Era Field	Recap
17	January 1	**New England Patriots**	**L** 14–35	10–6	Hard Rock Stadium	Recap

Note: Intra-division opponents are in bold text.

=== Postseason ===
Round	Date	Opponent (seed)	Result	Record	Venue	Recap
Wild Card	January 8, 2017	at Pittsburgh Steelers (3)	**L** 12–30	0–1	Heinz Field	Recap

== Game summaries ==
=== Regular season ===
==== Week 1: at Seattle Seahawks ====
Week One: Miami Dolphins at Seattle Seahawks – Game summary

Quarter	1	2	3	4	Total
Dolphins	0	3	0	7	10
Seahawks	3	3	0	6	12

at CenturyLink Field, Seattle, Washington

- Date: September 11
- Game time: 4:05 p.m. EDT/1:05 p.m. PDT
- Game weather: 61 °F (16 °C), sunny
- Game attendance: 69,012
- Referee: John Hussey
- TV announcers (CBS): Ian Eagle, Dan Fouts and Evan Washburn
- Recap, Game book

Game information

First quarter

- SEA – Steven Hauschka 39-yard field goal, 5:11. Seahawks 3–0. Drive: 12 plays, 46 yards, 6:08.

Second quarter

- MIA – Andrew Franks 41-yard field goal, 8:45. Tied 3–3. Drive: 6 plays, 19 yards, 2:06.
- SEA – Steven Hauschka 38-yard field goal, 0:00. Seahawks 6–3. Drive: 10 plays, 72 yards, 1:52.

Third quarter

- No scoring plays

Fourth quarter

- MIA – Ryan Tannehill 2-yard run (Andrew Franks kick), 4:08. Dolphins 10–6. Drive: 7 plays, 86 yards, 3:01.
- SEA – Doug Baldwin 2-yard pass from Russell Wilson (kick blocked), 0:31. Seahawks 12–10. Drive: 14 plays, 75 yards, 3:37.

Top passers

- MIA – Ryan Tannehill – 16/29, 186 yards
- SEA – Russell Wilson – 27/43, 258 yards, TD, INT

Top rushers

- MIA – Arian Foster – 13 rushes, 38 yards
- SEA – Christine Michael – 15 rushes, 66 yards

Top receivers

- MIA – Jarvis Landry – 7 receptions, 59 yards
- SEA – Doug Baldwin – 9 receptions, 92 yards, TD

The Dolphins opened their 2016 season at Seattle. This game would mark their first visit to Seattle since 2004. In the first quarter, the Dolphins would trail early as Steven Hauschka nailed a 39-yard field goal, giving Seattle a 3–0 lead. Miami would tie the game 3–3 on an Andrew Franks 41-yard field goal. But, the Seahawks would retake the lead on another Hauschka field goal, this time from 38 yards. After a scoreless 3rd quarter, Miami would finally take their first lead on a Ryan Tannehill 2 yard touchdown run, giving Miami a 10–6 lead with 4:08 left. However, Seattle would march down the field and take the lead for good, as Russell Wilson found Doug Baldwin from 2 yards out. With the loss, Miami started their season 0–1.

==== Week 2: at New England Patriots ====
Week Two: Miami Dolphins at New England Patriots – Game summary

Quarter	1	2	3	4	Total
Dolphins	0	3	7	14	24
Patriots	14	10	7	0	31

at Gillette Stadium, Foxborough, Massachusetts

- Date: September 18
- Game time: 1:00 p.m. EDT
- Game weather: 79 °F (26 °C), cloudy
- Game attendance: 66,829
- Referee: Craig Wrolstad
- TV announcers (CBS): Greg Gumbel, Trent Green and Jamie Erdahl
- Recap, Game book

Game information

First quarter

- NE – Danny Amendola 12-yard pass from Jimmy Garoppolo (Stephen Gostkowski kick), 10:53. Patriots 7–0. Drive: 8 plays, 75 yards, 4:07.
- NE – Martellus Bennett 20-yard pass from Jimmy Garoppolo (Stephen Gostkowski kick), 6:22. Patriots 14–0. Drive: 7 plays, 75 yards, 3:10.

Second quarter

- NE – Danny Amendola 10-yard pass from Jimmy Garoppolo (Stephen Gostkowski kick), 13:10. Patriots 21–0. Drive: 12 plays, 76 yards, 6:21.
- NE – Stephen Gostkowski 34-yard field goal, 2:48. Patriots 24–0. Drive 9 plays, 36 yards, 3:01.
- MIA – Andrew Franks 27-yard field goal, 0:00. Patriots 24–3. Drive 9 plays, 77 yards, 0:58.

Third quarter

- NE – LeGarrette Blount 9-yard run (Stephen Gostkowski kick), 8:44. Patriots 31–3. Drive: 5 plays, 68 yards, 2:51
- MIA – Kenny Stills 24-yard pass from Ryan Tannehill (Andrew Franks kick), 5:45. Patriots 31–10. Drive: 7 plays, 75 yards, 2:59.

Fourth quarter

- MIA – Jordan Cameron 12-yard pass from Ryan Tannehill (Andrew Franks kick), 14:51. Patriots 31–17. Drive: 5 plays, 88 yards, 4:43.
- MIA – Kenyan Drake 7-yard run (Andrew Franks kick), 6:06. Patriots 31–24. Drive: 9 plays, 74 yards, 4:43

Top passers

- MIA – Ryan Tannehill – 32/45, 387 yards, 2 TD, 2 INT
- NE – Jimmy Garoppolo – 18/26, 232 yards, 3 TD

Top rushers

- MIA – Ryan Tannehill – 6 rushes, 35 yards
- NE – LeGarrette Blount – 29 rushes, 123 yards, TD

Top receivers

- MIA – Jarvis Landry – 10 receptions, 135 yards
- NE – Martellus Bennett – 5 receptions, 114 yards, TD

After trailing 31–3 for most of the game, Miami made the game close, but the comeback was short, as the Patriots held on for the win. With the loss, Miami fell to 0–2 for the first time since 2011.

==== Week 3: vs. Cleveland Browns ====
Week Three: Cleveland Browns at Miami Dolphins – Game summary

Quarter	1	2	3	4	OT	Total
Browns	0	13	0	11	0	24
Dolphins	7	3	7	7	6	30

at Hard Rock Stadium, Miami Gardens, Florida

- Date: September 25
- Game time: 1:00 p.m. EDT
- Game weather: 86 °F (30 °C), clear
- Game attendance: 65,176
- Referee: Clete Blakeman
- TV announcers (CBS): Spero Dedes and Solomon Wilcots
- Recap, Game book

Game information

First quarter

- MIA – DeVante Parker 26-yard pass from Ryan Tannehill (Andrew Franks kick), 10:16. Dolphins 7–0. Drive: 5 plays, 61 yards, 2:37.

Second quarter

- CLE – Cody Parkey 46-yard field goal, 13:32. Dolphins 7–3. Drive: 10 plays, 58 yards, 5:03.
- CLE – Briean Boddy-Calhoun 27-yard interception return (Cody Parkey kick), 6:47. Browns 10–7.
- MIA – Andrew Franks 37-yard field goal, 1:57. Tied 10–10. Drive: 10 plays, 56 yards, 4:50.
- CLE – Cody Parkey 48-yard field goal, 0:42. Browns 13–10. Drive: 8 plays, 45 yards, 1:15.

Third quarter

- MIA – Jarvis Landry 42-yard pass from Ryan Tannehill (Andrew Franks kick), 5:17. Dolphins 17–13. Drive: 4 plays, 68 yards, 2:10.

Fourth quarter

- MIA – Damien Williams 10-yard pass from Ryan Tannehill (Andrew Franks kick), 14:17. Dolphins 24–13. Drive: 6 plays, 64 yards, 3:16.
- CLE – Terrelle Pryor 3-yard run (Cody Kessler–Gary Barnidge pass), 10:12. Dolphins 24–21. Drive: 9 plays, 83 yards, 4:05.
- CLE – Cody Parkey 38-yard field goal, 3:14. Tied 24–24. Drive: 8 plays, 74 yards, 3:03.

Overtime

- MIA – Jay Ajayi 11-yard run, 8:26. Dolphins 30–24. Drive: 3 plays, 44 yards, 1:13.

Top passers

- CLE – Cody Kessler – 21/33, 244 yards
- MIA – Ryan Tannehill – 25/39, 319 yards, 3 TD, 2 INT

Top rushers

- CLE – Isaiah Crowell – 15 rushes, 79 yards
- MIA – Kenyan Drake – 9 rushes, 37 yards

Top receivers

- CLE – Terrelle Pryor – 8 receptions, 144 yards
- MIA – Jarvis Landry – 7 receptions, 120 yards, TD

Cleveland kicker Cody Parkey missed three field goals in the game, including a potential game winner with no time left on the clock. After both teams failed on their opening drive of the overtime period, Jay Ajayi capped a three-play, 44-yard drive with an 11-yard run into the end zone to give Miami the win. With that, the Dolphins improved to 1–2.

==== Week 4: at Cincinnati Bengals ====
Week Four: Miami Dolphins at Cincinnati Bengals – Game summary

Quarter	1	2	3	4	Total
Dolphins	7	0	0	0	7
Bengals	10	6	3	3	22

at Paul Brown Stadium, Cincinnati, Ohio

- Date: September 29
- Game time: 8:25 p.m. EDT
- Game weather: 62 °F (17 °C), mostly cloudy
- Game attendance: 60,834
- Referee: Bill Vinovich
- TV announcers (NFLN): Jim Nantz, Phil Simms and Tracy Wolfson
- Recap, Game book

Game information

First quarter

- CIN – Mike Nugent 42-yard field goal, 9:51. Bengals 3–0. Drive: 11 plays, 54 yards, 5:09.
- MIA – Kenny Stills 74-yard pass from Ryan Tannehill (Andrew Franks kick), 9:04. Dolphins 7–3. Drive: 2 plays, 81 yards, 0:47.
- CIN – A. J. Green 7-yard pass from Andy Dalton (Mike Nugent kick), 3:19. Bengals 10–7. Drive: 7 plays, 90 yards, 3:24.

Second quarter

- CIN – Mike Nugent 22-yard field goal, 4:12. Bengals 13–7. Drive: 14 plays, 80 yards, 8:25.
- CIN – Mike Nugent 43-yard field goal, 1:06. Bengals 16–7. Drive: 4 plays, 2 yards, 1:01.

Third quarter

- CIN – Mike Nugent 22-yard field goal, 6:09. Bengals 19–7. Drive: 9 plays, 85 yards, 4:16.

Fourth quarter

- CIN – Mike Nugent 47-yard field goal, 13:30. Bengals 22–7. Drive: 10 plays, 45 yards, 5:25.

Top passers

- MIA – Ryan Tannehill – 15/25, 189 yards, TD, INT
- CIN – Andy Dalton – 22/31, 296 yards, TD

Top rushers

- MIA – Jay Ajayi – 6 rushes, 33 yards
- CIN – Jeremy Hill – 21 rushes, 71 yards

Top receivers

- MIA – Kenny Stills – 1 reception, 74 yards, TD
- CIN – A. J. Green – 10 receptions, 173 yards, TD

The Dolphins wore orange Color Rush uniforms for this game. The Bengals dominated this game from start to finish, forcing two Miami turnovers. With the loss, the Dolphins fell to 1–3.

==== Week 5: vs. Tennessee Titans ====
Week Five: Tennessee Titans at Miami Dolphins – Game summary

Quarter	1	2	3	4	Total
Titans	7	14	3	6	30
Dolphins	0	14	3	0	17

at Hard Rock Stadium, Miami Gardens, Florida

- Date: October 9
- Game time: 1:00 p.m. EDT
- Game weather: 88 °F (31 °C), partly cloudy
- Game attendance: 64,425
- Referee: Craig Wrolstad
- TV announcers (CBS): Andrew Catalon, Steve Beuerlein and Steve Tasker
- Recap, Game book

Game information

First quarter

- TEN – Marcus Mariota 5-yard run (Ryan Succop kick), 0:23. Titans 7–0. Drive: 5 plays, 61 yards, 2:49.

Second quarter

- MIA – Jakeem Grant 74-yard punt return (Andrew Franks kick), 12:23. Tied 7–7.
- TEN – Andre Johnson 5-yard pass from Marcus Mariota (Ryan Succop kick), 5:30. Titans 14–7. Drive: 12 plays, 76 yards, 6:53.
- MIA – Jay Ajayi 4-yard run (Andrew Franks kick), 2:00. Tied 14–14. Drive: 6 plays, 79 yards, 3:30.
- TEN – Delanie Walker 20-yard pass from Marcus Mariota (Ryan Succop kick), 0:47. Titans 21–14. Drive: 6 plays, 75 yards, 1:13.

Third quarter

- TEN – Ryan Succop 40-yard field goal, 10:33. Titans 24–14. Drive: 4 plays, 2 yards, 1:25.
- MIA – Andrew Franks 24-yard field goal, 5:10. Titans 24–17. Drive: 8 plays, 69 yards, 5:23.

Fourth quarter

- TEN – Rishard Matthews 4-yard pass from Marcus Mariota (kick blocked), 8:23. Titans 30–17. Drive: 9 plays, 66 yards, 4:54.

Top passers

- TEN – Marcus Mariota – 20/29, 163 yards, 3 TD
- MIA – Ryan Tannehill – 12/18, 191 yards, 2 INT

Top rushers

- TEN – DeMarco Murray – 27 rushes, 121 yards
- MIA – Jay Ajayi – 13 rushes, 42 yards, TD

Top receivers

- TEN – Delanie Walker – 5 receptions, 66 yards, TD
- MIA – DeVante Parker – 2 receptions, 70 yards

In the first of three games at home before their bye, the Dolphins gave up an early lead to the Tennessee Titans that they failed to overturn, as they fell to 1–4. Tannehill was sacked six times in the game.

==== Week 6: vs. Pittsburgh Steelers ====
Week Six: Pittsburgh Steelers at Miami Dolphins – Game summary

Quarter	1	2	3	4	Total
Steelers	8	0	0	7	15
Dolphins	3	13	7	7	30

at Hard Rock Stadium, Miami Gardens, Florida

- Date: October 16
- Game time: 1:00 p.m. EDT
- Game weather: 81 °F (27 °C), partly sunny
- Game attendance: 65,351
- Referee: Ed Hochuli
- TV announcers (CBS): Spero Dedes and Solomon Wilcots
- Recap, Game book

Game information

First quarter

- MIA – Andrew Franks 30-yard field goal, 8:34. Dolphins 3–0. Drive: 9 plays, 53 yards, 3:39.
- PIT – Darrius Heyward-Bey 60-yard run (Ben Roethlisberger–Le'Veon Bell pass), 5:39. Steelers 8–3. Drive: 6 plays, 75 yards, 2:55.

Second quarter

- MIA – Andrew Franks 23-yard field goal, 8:18. Steelers 8–6. Drive: 12 plays, 85 yards, 7:08.
- MIA – Andrew Franks 30-yard field goal, 5:23. Dolphins 9–8. Drive: 4 plays, 1 yard, 2:43.
- MIA – Damien Williams 1-yard run (Andrew Franks kick), 0:21. Dolphins 16–8. Drive: 9 plays, 71 yards, 2:26.

Third quarter

- MIA – Jay Ajayi 1-yard run (Andrew Franks kick), 1:39. Dolphins 23–8. Drive: 6 plays, 52 yards, 3:31.

Fourth quarter

- PIT – Cobi Hamilton 23-yard pass from Ben Roethlisberger (Chris Boswell kick), 1:02. Dolphins 23–15. Drive: 10 plays, 97 yards, 3:18.
- MIA – Jay Ajayi 62-yard run (Andrew Franks kick), 0:50. Dolphins 30–15. Drive: 1 play, 62 yards, 0:12.

Top passers

- PIT – Ben Roethlisberger – 19/34, 189 yards, TD, 2 INT
- MIA – Ryan Tannehill – 24/32, 252 yards

Top rushers

- PIT – Darrius Heyward-Bey – 1 rush, 60 yards, TD
- MIA – Jay Ajayi – 25 rushes, 204 yards, 2 TD

Top receivers

- PIT – Le'Veon Bell – 6 receptions, 55 yards
- MIA – Jarvis Landry – 7 receptions, 91 yards

Ben Roethlisberger was injured and taken out of the game briefly after throwing two interceptions and tearing his meniscus. The Steelers led 8–3 with less than 10 minutes played in the first quarter, but the Dolphins outscored the Steelers 27–7 for the remainder of the game. With the win, the Dolphins improved to 2–4, and started a six-game winning streak.

==== Week 7: vs. Buffalo Bills ====
Week Seven: Buffalo Bills at Miami Dolphins – Game summary

Quarter	1	2	3	4	Total
Bills	3	7	7	8	25
Dolphins	3	3	8	14	28

at Hard Rock Stadium, Miami Gardens, Florida

- Date: October 23
- Game time: 1:00 p.m. EDT
- Game weather: 81 °F (27 °C), partly sunny
- Game attendance: 65,658
- Referee: Brad Allen
- TV announcers (CBS): Tom McCarthy, Adam Archuleta and Kevin Manuel
- Recap, Game book

Game information

First quarter

- MIA – Andrew Franks 36-yard field goal, 7:28. Dolphins 3–0. Drive: 15 plays, 64 yards, 7:32.
- BUF – Dan Carpenter 29-yard field goal, 0:49. Tied 3–3. Drive: 6 plays, 20 yards, 1:59.

Second quarter

- BUF – Tyrod Taylor 10-yard run (Dan Carpenter kick), 11:47. Bills 10–3. Drive: 7 plays, 40 yards, 2:50.
- MIA – Andrew Franks 33-yard field goal, 3:47. Bills 10–6. Drive: 12 plays, 58 yards, 8:00.

Third quarter

- BUF – Marquise Goodwin 67-yard pass from Tyrod Taylor (Dan Carpenter kick), 5:51. Bills 17–6. Drive: 1 play, 67 yards, 0:09.
- MIA – Jay Ajayi 4-yard run (Ryan Tannehill–Jarvis Landry pass), 0:18. Bills 17–14. Drive: 10 plays, 75 yards, 5:33.

Fourth quarter

- MIA – Damien Williams 12-yard run (Andrew Franks kick), 3:56. Dolphins 21–17. Drive: 6 plays, 64 yards, 3:49.
- MIA – Kenny Stills 66-yard pass from Ryan Tannehill (Andrew Franks kick), 2:24. Dolphins 28–17. Drive: 3 plays, 70 yards, 1:03.
- BUF – Reggie Bush 1-yard run (Tyrod Taylor–Reggie Bush pass), 0:14. Dolphins 28–25. Drive: 13 plays, 75 yards, 2:10.

Top passers

- BUF – Tyrod Taylor – 14/28, 221 yards, TD
- MIA – Ryan Tannehill – 15/25, 204 yards, TD

Top rushers

- BUF – Tyrod Taylor – 7 rushes, 35 yards, TD
- MIA – Jay Ajayi – 28 rushes, 214 yards, TD

Top receivers

- BUF – Marquise Goodwin – 4 receptions, 93 yards, TD
- MIA – Kenny Stills – 5 receptions, 100 yards, TD

The Dolphins trailed 17–6 going into the final minute of the third quarter, but three consecutive touchdowns by the Dolphins gave them a 28–25 win and they improved to 3–4. Running back Jay Ajayi became the first Dolphins running back to rush for over 200 yards in consecutive games since Ricky Williams accomplished the feat in 2002.

==== Week 9: vs. New York Jets ====
Week Nine: New York Jets at Miami Dolphins – Game summary

Quarter	1	2	3	4	Total
Jets	10	3	0	10	23
Dolphins	7	7	6	7	27

at Hard Rock Stadium, Miami Gardens, Florida

- Date: November 6
- Game time: 1:00 p.m. EST
- Game weather: 80 °F (27 °C), cloudy
- Game attendance: 65,722
- Referee: Walt Coleman
- TV announcers (CBS): Greg Gumbel, Trent Green and Jamie Erdahl
- Recap, Game book

Game information

First quarter

- NYJ – Nick Folk 23-yard field goal, 8:26. Jets 3–0. Drive: 13 plays, 70 yards, 6:34.
- MIA – Jay Ajayi 20-yard run (Andrew Franks kick), 4:56. Dolphins 7–3. Drive: 6 plays, 75 yards, 3:30.
- NYJ – Matt Forte 31-yard run (Nick Folk kick), 0:35. Jets 10–7. Drive: 7 plays, 75 yards, 4:21.

Second quarter

- MIA – Dominique Jones 1-yard pass from Ryan Tannehill (Andrew Franks kick), 10:16. Dolphins 14–10. Drive: 11 plays, 75 yards, 5:19.
- NYJ – Nick Folk 21-yard field goal, 5:20. Dolphins 14–13. Drive: 9 plays, 75 yards, 4:56.

Third quarter

- MIA – Andrew Franks 33-yard field goal, 5:08. Dolphins 17–13. Drive: 10 plays, 56 yards, 4:53.
- MIA – Andrew Franks 29-yard field goal, 3:22. Dolphins 20–13. Drive: 4 plays, 3 yards, 1:38.

Fourth quarter

- NYJ – Nick Folk 28-yard field goal, 12:50. Dolphins 20–16. Drive: 9 plays, 67 yards, 5:32.
- NYJ – Jalin Marshall 18-yard pass from Ryan Fitzpatrick (Nick Folk kick), 5:42. Jets 23–20. Drive: 2 plays, 18 yards, 0:10.
- MIA – Kenyan Drake 96-yard kickoff return (Andrew Franks kick), 5:15. Dolphins 27–23. Drive: 0 plays, 0 yards, 0:27.

Top passers

- NYJ – Ryan Fitzpatrick – 16/27, 194 yards, TD, 2 INT
- MIA – Ryan Tannehill – 17/28, 149 yards, TD

Top rushers

- NYJ – Matt Forte – 12 rushes, 92 yards, TD
- MIA – Jay Ajayi – 24 rushes, 111 yards, TD

Top receivers

- NYJ – Jalin Marshall – 3 receptions, 59 yards, TD
- MIA – Dominique Jones – 3 receptions, 42 yards, TD

The Dolphins had the lead going into the fourth quarter, only for Jalin Marshall to put the Jets ahead with less than six minutes to go; however, Kenyan Drake returned the ensuing kickoff 96 yards for a touchdown to give the Dolphins the win, and they improved to 4–4. They also defeated the Jets at home for the first time since 2011.

==== Week 10: at San Diego Chargers ====
Week Ten: Miami Dolphins at San Diego Chargers – Game summary

Quarter	1	2	3	4	Total
Dolphins	0	7	14	10	31
Chargers	0	10	7	7	24

at Qualcomm Stadium, San Diego, California

- Date: November 13
- Game time: 4:05 p.m. EST/1:05 p.m. PST
- Game weather: 85 °F (29 °C), sunny
- Game attendance: 55,107
- Referee: Terry McAulay
- TV announcers (CBS): Greg Gumbel, Trent Green and Jamie Erdahl
- Recap, Game book

Game information

First quarter

- No scoring plays

Second quarter

- SD – Josh Lambo 45-yard field goal, 14:51. Chargers 3–0. Drive: 7 plays, 46 yards, 3:03.
- SD – Antonio Gates 11-yard pass from Philip Rivers (Josh Lambo kick), 7:37. Chargers 10–0. Drive: 9 plays, 80 yards, 4:53.
- MIA – Kenny Stills 39-yard pass from Ryan Tannehill (Andrew Franks kick), 2:50. Chargers 10–7. Drive: 9 plays, 74 yards, 4:47.

Third quarter

- MIA – Damien Williams 2-yard run (Andrew Franks kick), 12:29. Dolphins 14–10. Drive: 5 plays, 75 yards, 2:31.
- SD – Hunter Henry 7-yard pass from Philip Rivers (Josh Lambo kick), 5:36. Chargers 17–14. Drive: 12 plays, 75 yards, 6:53.
- MIA – Damien Williams 18-yard pass from Ryan Tannehill (Andrew Franks kick), 1:43. Dolphins 21–17. Drive: 8 plays, 75 yards, 3:53.

Fourth quarter

- SD – Tyrell Williams 51-yard pass from Philip Rivers (Josh Lambo kick), 4:04. Chargers 24–21. Drive: 4 plays, 58 yards, 1:02.
- MIA – Andrew Franks 27-yard field goal, 2:57. Tied 24–24. Drive: 5 plays, 66 yards, 1:07.
- MIA – Kiko Alonso 60-yard interception return (Andrew Franks kick), 1:01. Dolphins 31–24.

Top passers

- MIA – Ryan Tannehill – 17/24, 240 yards, 2 TD
- SD – Philip Rivers – 23/44, 326 yards, 3 TD, 4 INT

Top rushers

- MIA – Jay Ajayi – 19 rushes, 79 yards
- SD – Melvin Gordon – 24 rushes, 70 yards

Top receivers

- MIA – DeVante Parker – 5 receptions, 103 yards
- SD – Tyrell Williams – 5 receptions, 125 yards, TD

The Dolphins would intercept Philip Rivers four times in the second half. Towards the end of the game, Kiko Alonso returned an interception 60 yards for the game-winning touchdown. With the win, the Dolphins went to 5–4.

==== Week 11: at Los Angeles Rams ====
Week Eleven: Miami Dolphins at Los Angeles Rams – Game summary

Quarter	1	2	3	4	Total
Dolphins	0	0	0	14	14
Rams	7	0	3	0	10

at Los Angeles Memorial Coliseum, Los Angeles, California

- Date: November 20
- Game time: 4:05 p.m. EST/1:05 p.m. PST
- Game weather: 63 °F (17 °C), rain
- Game attendance: 83,483
- Referee: Gene Steratore
- TV announcers (Fox): Chris Myers, Ronde Barber and Jennifer Hale
- Recap, Game book

Game information

First quarter

- LA – Todd Gurley 24-yard run (Greg Zuerlein kick), 9:47. Rams 7–0. Drive: 4 plays, 68 yards, 1:55.

Second quarter

- No scoring plays

Third quarter

- LA – Greg Zuerlein 46-yard field goal, 1:39. Rams 10–0. Drive: 10 plays, 49 yards, 6:05.

Fourth quarter

- MIA – Jarvis Landry 10-yard pass from Ryan Tannehill (Andrew Franks kick), 4:02. Rams 10–7. Drive: 8 plays, 77 yards, 2:38.
- MIA – DeVante Parker 9-yard pass from Ryan Tannehill (Andrew Franks kick), 0:36. Dolphins 14–10. Drive: 7 plays, 75 yards, 1:35.

Top passers

- MIA – Ryan Tannehill – 24/34, 172 yards, 2 TD, INT
- LA – Jared Goff – 17/31, 134 yards

Top rushers

- MIA – Jay Ajayi – 16 carries, 77 yards
- LA – Todd Gurley – 20 carries, 76 yards, TD

Top receivers

- MIA – DeVante Parker – 8 receptions, 79 yards, TD
- LA – Kenny Britt – 5 receptions, 43 yards

Miami trailed 10–0 with just over four minutes remaining, but touchdown passes from quarterback Ryan Tannehill to Jarvis Landry and DeVante Parker put the Dolphins up by four points with 36 seconds left on the clock. The Rams' rookie quarterback Jared Goff attempted a hail mary pass to try and give the Rams the win, but the pass was incomplete, resulting in a 14–10 win for the Dolphins. With the win, the Dolphins improved to 6–4. They also improved to 11–2 all-time against the Rams, with 2001 being the last season the Rams defeated the Dolphins. It was also the Dolphins' first 5-game winning streak since 2008.

==== Week 12: vs. San Francisco 49ers ====
Week Twelve: San Francisco 49ers at Miami Dolphins – Game summary

Quarter	1	2	3	4	Total
49ers	7	0	7	10	24
Dolphins	0	14	10	7	31

at Hard Rock Stadium, Miami Gardens, Florida

- Date: November 27
- Game time: 1:00 p.m. EST
- Game weather: 79 °F (26 °C), partly cloudy
- Game attendance: 65,856
- Referee: Ronald Torbert
- TV announcers (Fox): Thom Brennaman, Charles Davis, Chris Spielman and Holly Sonders
- Recap, Game book

Game information

First quarter

- SF – Carlos Hyde 11-yard pass from Colin Kaepernick (Phil Dawson kick), 9:46. 49ers 7–0. Drive: 8 plays, 62 yards, 3:30.

Second quarter

- MIA – Jay Ajayi 2-yard run (Andrew Franks kick), 12:22. Tied 7–7. Drive: 11 plays, 91 yards, 5:28.
- MIA – Dion Sims 16-yard pass from Ryan Tannehill (Andrew Franks kick), 2:17. Dolphins 14–7. Drive: 11 plays, 84 yards, 6:50.

Third quarter

- MIA – Andrew Franks 24-yard field goal, 12:31. Dolphins 17–7. Drive: 5 plays, 20 yards, 2:18.
- SF – Garrett Celek 4-yard pass from Colin Kaepernick (Phil Dawson kick), 7:34. Dolphins 17–14. Drive: 9 plays, 91 yards, 4:57.
- MIA – Kenny Stills 43-yard pass from Ryan Tannehill (Andrew Franks kick), 1:33. Dolphins 24–14. Drive: 5 plays, 60 yards, 1:50.

Fourth quarter

- MIA – Leonte Carroo 15-yard pass from Ryan Tannehill (Andrew Franks kick), 11:31. Dolphins 31–14. Drive: 6 plays, 67 yards, 3:23.
- SF – Torrey Smith 1-yard pass from Colin Kaepernick (Phil Dawson kick), 7:42. Dolphins 31–21. Drive: 8 plays, 75 yards, 3:49.
- SF – Phil Dawson 36-yard field goal, 2:15. Dolphins 31–24. Drive: 14 plays, 62 yards, 3:36.

Top passers

- SF – Colin Kaepernick – 29/46, 296 yards, 3 TD, INT
- MIA – Ryan Tannehill – 20/30, 285 yards, 3 TD

Top rushers

- SF – Colin Kaepernick – 10 rushes, 113 yards
- MIA – Jay Ajayi – 18 rushes, 45 yards, TD

Top receivers

- SF – Vance McDonald – 4 receptions, 60 yards
- MIA – Kenny Stills – 3 receptions, 72 yards, TD

Holding a seven-point lead inside the two-minute warning, the Dolphins stopped 49ers quarterback Colin Kaepernick just short of the end zone as time expired to claim a 31–24 win and their first 6-game winning streak since 2005. With the win, the Dolphins improved to 7–4.

==== Week 13: at Baltimore Ravens ====
Week Thirteen: Miami Dolphins at Baltimore Ravens – Game summary

Quarter	1	2	3	4	Total
Dolphins	0	0	0	6	6
Ravens	14	10	0	14	38

at M&T Bank Stadium, Baltimore, Maryland

- Date: December 4
- Game time: 1:00 p.m. EST
- Game weather: 47 °F (8 °C), partly cloudy
- Game attendance: 70,916
- Referee: Carl Cheffers
- TV announcers (CBS): Kevin Harlan, Rich Gannon and Chris Fischer
- Recap, Game book

Game information

First quarter

- BAL – Terrance West 3-yard pass from Joe Flacco (Justin Tucker kick), 10:57. Ravens 7–0. Drive: 8 plays, 79 yards, 4:03.
- BAL – Dennis Pitta 13-yard pass from Joe Flacco (Justin Tucker kick), 3:17. Ravens 14–0. Drive: 8 plays, 63 yards, 3:37.

Second quarter

- BAL – Dennis Pitta 9-yard pass from Joe Flacco (Justin Tucker kick), 2:10. Ravens 21–0. Drive: 18 plays, 88 yards, 8:57.
- BAL – Justin Tucker 55-yard field goal, 0:00. Ravens 24–0. Drive: 7 plays, 48 yards, 0:59.

Third quarter

- No scoring plays

Fourth quarter

- MIA – DeVante Parker 8-yard pass from Ryan Tannehill (pass failed), 14:42. Ravens 24–6. Drive: 1 play, 8 yards, 0:05.
- BAL – Breshad Perriman 53-yard pass from Joe Flacco (Justin Tucker kick), 12:49. Ravens 31–6. Drive: 4 plays, 75 yards, 1:53.
- BAL – Terrance West 9-yard run (Justin Tucker kick), 5:55. Ravens 38–6. Drive: 4 plays, 41 yards, 1:26.

Top passers

- MIA – Ryan Tannehill – 29/40, 229 yards, TD, 3 INT
- BAL – Joe Flacco – 36/47, 381 yards, 4 TD, INT

Top rushers

- MIA – Jay Ajayi – 12 rushes, 61 yards
- BAL – Kenneth Dixon – 6 rushes, 56 yards

Top receivers

- MIA – Jarvis Landry – 11 receptions, 87 yards
- BAL – Dennis Pitta – 9 receptions, 90 yards, 2 TD

With the Dolphins seeking a 7-game winning streak for the first time since 1985 and the first win in Baltimore since 1997, this loss snapped the Dolphins' 6-game winning streak and they fell to 7–5. It was also Miami’s seventh loss to the Ravens in the last nine meetings.

==== Week 14: vs. Arizona Cardinals ====
Week Fourteen: Arizona Cardinals at Miami Dolphins – Game summary

Quarter	1	2	3	4	Total
Cardinals	6	3	0	14	23
Dolphins	7	7	7	5	26

at Hard Rock Stadium, Miami Gardens, Florida

- Date: December 11
- Game time: 1:00 p.m. EST
- Game weather: 77 °F (25 °C), cloudy
- Game attendance: 65,750
- Referee: Jerome Boger
- TV announcers (Fox): Chris Myers, Ronde Barber and Jennifer Hale
- Recap, Game book

Game information

First quarter

- MIA – Kenny Stills 28-yard pass from Ryan Tannehill (Andrew Franks kick), 9:27. Dolphins 7–0. Drive: 4 plays, 52 yards, 2:09.
- ARI – J. J. Nelson 56-yard run (kick failed, wide left), 8:00. Dolphins 7–6. Drive: 3 plays, 75 yards, 1:27.

Second quarter

- MIA – Dion Sims 7-yard pass from Ryan Tannehill (Andrew Franks kick), 11:41. Dolphins 14–6. Drive: 5 plays, 43 yards, 2:55.
- ARI – Chandler Catanzaro 56-yard field goal, 1:18. Dolphins 14–9. Drive: 4 plays, 0 yards, 0:21.

Third quarter

- MIA – Damien Williams 3-yard pass from Ryan Tannehill (Andrew Franks kick), 11:17. Dolphins 21–9. Drive: 6 plays, 77 yards, 3:43.

Fourth quarter

- ARI – Brittan Golden 9-yard pass from Carson Palmer, 7:05. Dolphins 21–15. Drive: 12 plays, 99 yards, 6:43.
- MIA – Walt Aikens defensive two-point conversion, 7:05. Dolphins 23–15.
- ARI – J. J. Nelson 8-yard pass from Carson Palmer (Carson Palmer–David Johnson pass), 3:01. Tied 23–23. Drive: 7 plays, 50 yards, 2:13.
- MIA – Andrew Franks 21-yard field goal, 0:00. Dolphins 26–23. Drive: 6 plays, 44 yards, 1:29.

Top passers

- ARI – Carson Palmer – 18/33, 145 yards, 2 TD, 2 INT
- MIA – Ryan Tannehill – 15/20, 195 yards, 3 TD, INT

Top rushers

- ARI – David Johnson – 20 rushes, 80 yards
- MIA – Jay Ajayi – 20 rushes, 48 yards

Top receivers

- ARI – Jermaine Gresham – 5 receptions, 45 yards
- MIA – Jarvis Landry – 4 receptions, 103 yards

On a wet day in Miami, Andrew Franks kicked the game-winning field goal as time expired to give the Dolphins a 26–23 win over the Arizona Cardinals. With the win, the Dolphins went to 8–5. The Dolphins also snapped their three-game losing streak against the Cardinals, beating them for the first time since 1999. Ryan Tannehill suffered a season-ending knee injury when he was hit low by Calais Campbell although the injury was diagnosed as a sprain and not a torn ACL as was originally feared.

==== Week 15: at New York Jets ====
Week Fifteen: Miami Dolphins at New York Jets – Game summary

Quarter	1	2	3	4	Total
Dolphins	0	13	21	0	34
Jets	7	3	0	3	13

at MetLife Stadium, East Rutherford, New Jersey

- Date: December 17
- Game time: 8:25 p.m. EST
- Game weather: 35 °F (2 °C), cloudy
- Game attendance: 78,160
- Referee: Pete Morelli
- TV announcers (NFLN): Mike Tirico, Doug Flutie, Tony Dungy and Heather Cox
- Recap, Game book

Game information

First quarter

- NYJ – Robby Anderson 40-yard pass from Bryce Petty (Nick Folk kick), 11:32. Jets 7–0. Drive: 7 plays, 75 yards, 3:28.

Second quarter

- MIA – Dion Sims 1-yard pass from Matt Moore (kick failed, hit left upright), 10:57. Jets 7–6. Drive: 8 plays, 52 yards, 4:23.
- MIA – Kenny Stills 52-yard pass from Matt Moore (Andrew Franks kick), 1:58. Dolphins 13–7. Drive: 3 plays, 53 yards, 1:51.
- NYJ – Nick Folk 48-yard field goal, 0:18. Dolphins 13–10. Drive: 11 plays, 48 yards, 1:40.

Third quarter

- MIA – Walt Aikens 11-yard return of blocked punt (Andrew Franks kick), 10:30. Dolphins 20–10.
- MIA – Dion Sims 1-yard pass from Matt Moore (Andrew Franks kick), 7:43. Dolphins 27–10. Drive: 5 plays, 60 yards, 2:32.
- MIA – Jarvis Landry 66-yard pass from Matt Moore (Andrew Franks kick), 6:26. Dolphins 34–10. Drive: 1 play, 66 yards, 0:10.

Fourth quarter

- NYJ – Nick Folk 36-yard field goal, 5:43. Dolphins 34–13. Drive: 9 plays, 37 yards, 4:08.

Top passers

- MIA – Matt Moore – 12/18, 236 yards, 4 TD, INT
- NYJ – Bryce Petty – 20/36, 235 yards, TD, 2 INT

Top rushers

- MIA – Jay Ajayi – 19 rushes, 51 yards
- NYJ – Bilal Powell – 16 rushes, 84 yards

Top receivers

- MIA – Jarvis Landry – 3 receptions, 108 yards, TD
- NYJ – Robby Anderson – 4 receptions, 80 yards, TD

With the blowout Saturday night win on the road, the Dolphins improved to 9–5, their first winning season since 2008. Matt Moore was named AFC Offensive Player of the Week for his four-touchdown performance.

==== Week 16: at Buffalo Bills ====
Week Sixteen: Miami Dolphins at Buffalo Bills – Game summary

Quarter	1	2	3	4	OT	Total
Dolphins	7	7	14	3	3	34
Bills	0	7	14	10	0	31

at New Era Field, Orchard Park, New York

- Date: December 24
- Game time: 1:00 p.m. EST
- Game weather: 38 °F (3 °C), cloudy
- Game attendance: 64,690
- Referee: Craig Wrolstad
- TV announcers (CBS): Greg Gumbel, Trent Green and Jamie Erdahl
- Recap, Game book

Game information

First quarter

- MIA – Jay Ajayi 2-yard run (Andrew Franks kick), 6:24. Dolphins 7–0. Drive: 9 plays, 72 yards, 4:13.

Second quarter

- MIA – Kenyan Drake 45-yard run (Andrew Franks kick), 13:34. Dolphins 14–0. Drive: 4 plays, 64 yards, 1:55.
- BUF – Sammy Watkins 38-yard pass from Tyrod Taylor (Dan Carpenter kick), 5:06. Dolphins 14–7. Drive: 6 plays, 79 yards, 2:45.

Third quarter

- MIA – DeVante Parker 56-yard pass from Matt Moore (Andrew Franks kick), 12:05. Dolphins 21–7. Drive: 5 plays, 70 yards, 2:55.
- BUF – LeSean McCoy 19-yard run (Dan Carpenter kick), 6:46. Dolphins 21–14. Drive: 10 plays, 77 yards, 5:19.
- MIA – Kenny Stills 6-yard pass from Matt Moore (Andrew Franks kick), 3:14. Dolphins 28–14. Drive: 6 plays, 75 yards, 3:32.
- BUF – Charles Clay 18-yard pass from Tyrod Taylor (Dan Carpenter kick), 2:02. Dolphins 28–21. Drive: 4 plays, 78 yards, 2:02.

Fourth quarter

- BUF – Dan Carpenter 28-yard field goal, 5:51. Dolphins 28–24. Drive: 10 plays, 89 yards, 4:24.
- BUF – Charles Clay 7-yard pass from Tyrod Taylor (Dan Carpenter kick), 1:20. Bills 31–28. Drive: 10 plays, 89 yards, 2:40.
- MIA – Andrew Franks 55-yard field goal, 0:06. Tied 31–31. Drive: 6 plays, 24 yards, 1:14.

Overtime

- MIA – Andrew Franks 27-yard field goal, 0:47. Dolphins 34–31. Drive: 7 plays, 77 yards, 3:13.

Top passers

- MIA – Matt Moore – 16/30, 233 yards, 2 TD, INT
- BUF – Tyrod Taylor – 26/39, 329 yards, 3 TD

Top rushers

- MIA – Jay Ajayi – 32 rushes, 206 yards, TD
- BUF – LeSean McCoy – 24 rushes, 128 yards, TD

Top receivers

- MIA – DeVante Parker – 4 receptions, 85 yards, TD
- BUF – Charles Clay – 8 receptions, 85 yards, 2 TD

Miami needed a 56-yard field goal by Andrew Franks to force overtime, and the combination of a missed Dan Carpenter FG attempt by Buffalo and a 57-yard run by Jay Ajayi set Franks up to make the game-winning kick. This clinched Miami's first 10-win season since 2008, and after the Christmas Day win by Kansas City over Denver, it also led to Miami's first playoff berth in eight years.

==== Week 17: vs. New England Patriots ====
Week Seventeen: New England Patriots at Miami Dolphins – Game summary

Quarter	1	2	3	4	Total
Patriots	14	6	7	8	35
Dolphins	0	7	7	0	14

at Hard Rock Stadium, Miami Gardens, Florida

- Date: January 1, 2017
- Game time: 1:00 p.m. EST
- Game weather: 80 °F (27 °C), clear
- Game attendance: 66,163
- Referee: John Parry
- TV announcers (CBS): Ian Eagle, Dan Fouts and Evan Washburn
- Recap, Game book

Game information

First quarter

- NE – Martellus Bennett 2-yard pass from Tom Brady (Stephen Gostkowski kick), 7:28. Patriots 7–0. Drive: 13 plays, 75 yards, 7:32.
- NE – Michael Floyd 14-yard pass from Tom Brady (Stephen Gostkowski kick), 3:44. Patriots 14–0. Drive: 5 plays, 45 yards, 1:59.

Second quarter

- NE – Stephen Gostkowski 40-yard field goal, 14:56. Patriots 17–0. Drive: 8 plays, 34 yards, 2:58.
- NE – Stephen Gostkowski 26-yard field goal, 3:21. Patriots 20–0. Drive: 15 plays, 52 yards, 8:19.
- MIA – Jarvis Landry 8-yard pass from Matt Moore (Andrew Franks kick), 0:28. Patriots 20–7. Drive: 10 plays, 75 yards, 2:53.

Third quarter

- MIA – Kenny Stills 25-yard pass from Matt Moore (Andrew Franks kick), 8:39. Patriots 20–14. Drive: 12 plays, 75 yards, 6:21.
- NE – Julian Edelman 77-yard pass from Tom Brady (Stephen Gostkowski kick), 6:41. Patriots 27–14. Drive: 3 plays, 80 yards, 1:58.

Fourth quarter

- NE – LeGarrette Blount 1-yard run (Tom Brady–Julian Edelman pass), 5:33. Patriots 35–14. Drive: 6 plays, 18 yards, 3:02.

Top passers

- NE – Tom Brady – 25/33, 276 yards, 3 TD
- MIA – Matt Moore – 24/34, 205 yards, 2 TD, INT

Top rushers

- NE – LeGarrette Blount – 14 rushes, 51 yards, TD
- MIA – Jay Ajayi – 16 rushes, 59 yards

Top receivers

- NE – Julian Edelman – 8 receptions, 151 yards, TD
- MIA – Jarvis Landry – 9 receptions, 76 yards, TD

With the loss, Miami ended their season 10–6 and finished as the 6th seed in the AFC. This would be the last season the Dolphins failed to beat the Patriots until 2025.

=== Postseason ===
==== AFC Wild Card Playoffs: at (3) Pittsburgh Steelers ====
AFC Wild Card Playoffs: (6) Miami Dolphins at (3) Pittsburgh Steelers – Game summary

Quarter	1	2	3	4	Total
Dolphins	3	3	0	6	12
Steelers	14	6	10	0	30

at Heinz Field, Pittsburgh, Pennsylvania

- Date: January 8, 2017
- Game time: 1:05 p.m. EST
- Game weather: 17 °F (−8 °C), partly cloudy
- Game attendance: 62,726
- Referee: Craig Wrolstad
- TV announcers (CBS): Jim Nantz, Phil Simms, Tracy Wolfson and Jay Feely
- Recap, Gamebook

Game information

First quarter

- PIT – Antonio Brown 50-yard pass from Ben Roethlisberger (Chris Boswell kick), 12:15. Steelers 7–0. Drive: 5 plays, 85 yards, 2:45.
- PIT – Antonio Brown 62-yard pass from Ben Roethlisberger (Chris Boswell kick), 6:50. Steelers 14–0. Drive: 6 plays, 90 yards, 3:10.
- MIA – Andrew Franks 38-yard field goal, 3:06. Steelers 14–3. Drive: 7 play, 39 yards, 3:44.

Second quarter

- PIT – Le'Veon Bell 1-yard run (kick failed, hit right upright), 12:39. Steelers 20–3. Drive: 10 plays, 83 yards, 5:27.
- MIA – Andrew Franks 47-yard field goal, 4:52. Steelers 20–6. Drive: 12 play, 39 yards, 7:47.

Third quarter

- PIT – Chris Boswell 34-yard field goal, 6:32. Steelers 23–6. Drive: 8 play, 43 yards, 4:16.
- PIT – Le'Veon Bell 8-yard run (Chris Boswell kick), 2:05. Steelers 30–6. Drive: 7 plays, 25 yards, 4:18.

Fourth quarter

- MIA – Damien Williams 4-yard pass from Matt Moore (pass failed), 5:57. Steelers 30–12. Drive: 9 plays, 70 yards, 4:20.

Top passers

- MIA – Matt Moore – 29/36, 289 yards, TD, INT
- PIT – Ben Roethlisberger – 13/18, 197 yards, 2 TD, 2 INT

Top rushers

- MIA – Jay Ajayi – 16 rushes, 33 yards
- PIT – Le'Veon Bell – 29 rushes, 167 yards, 2 TD

Top receivers

- MIA – Jarvis Landry – 11 receptions, 102 yards
- PIT – Antonio Brown – 5 receptions, 124 yards, 2 TD

With the loss it marked the Dolphins 16th straight year without a playoff win. this would also be their last postseason appearance until 2022.

== Standings ==
=== Division ===
AFC East
	W	L	T	PCT	DIV	CONF	PF	PA	STK
^{(1)} New England Patriots	14	2	0	.875	5–1	11–1	441	250	W7
^{(6)} Miami Dolphins	10	6	0	.625	4–2	7–5	363	380	L1
Buffalo Bills	7	9	0	.438	1–5	4–8	399	378	L2
New York Jets	5	11	0	.313	2–4	4–8	275	409	W1

=== Conference ===
AFC
#	Team	Division	W	L	T	PCT	DIV	CONF	SOS	SOV	STK
Division leaders
1	New England Patriots	East	14	2	0	.875	5–1	11–1	.439	.424	W7
2 (Note: Kansas City clinched the AFC West division over Oakland based on head-to-head sweep.)	Kansas City Chiefs	West	12	4	0	.750	6–0	9–3	.508	.479	W2
3	Pittsburgh Steelers	North	11	5	0	.688	5–1	9–3	.494	.423	W7
4 (Note: Houston clinched the AFC South division title over Tennessee based on record vs. division opponents.)	Houston Texans	South	9	7	0	.563	5–1	7–5	.502	.427	L1
Wild Cards
5	Oakland Raiders	West	12	4	0	.750	3–3	9–3	.504	.443	L1
6	Miami Dolphins	East	10	6	0	.625	4–2	7–5	.455	.341	L1
Did not qualify for the postseason
7 (Note: Tennessee finished ahead of Denver based on head-to-head victory.)	Tennessee Titans	South	9	7	0	.563	2–4	6–6	.465	.458	W1
8	Denver Broncos	West	9	7	0	.563	2–4	6–6	.549	.455	W1
9 (Note: Baltimore finished ahead of Indianapolis based on record vs. conference opponents.)	Baltimore Ravens	North	8	8	0	.500	4–2	7–5	.498	.363	L2
10	Indianapolis Colts	South	8	8	0	.500	3–3	5–7	.492	.406	W1
11	Buffalo Bills	East	7	9	0	.438	1–5	4–8	.482	.339	L2
12	Cincinnati Bengals	North	6	9	1	.406	3–3	5–7	.521	.333	W1
13 (Note: The New York Jets finished ahead of San Diego based record vs. common opponents — the Jets' cumulative record against Cleveland, Indianapolis, Kansas City and Miami was 1–4, while San Diego's cumulative record against the same four teams was 0–5.)	New York Jets	East	5	11	0	.313	2–4	4–8	.518	.313	W1
14	San Diego Chargers	West	5	11	0	.313	1–5	4–8	.543	.513	L5
15	Jacksonville Jaguars	South	3	13	0	.188	2–4	2–10	.527	.417	L1
16	Cleveland Browns	North	1	15	0	.063	0–6	1–11	.549	.313	L1
Tiebreakers (Note: When breaking ties for three or more teams under the NFL's rules, they are first broken within divisions, then comparing only the highest ranked remaining team from each division.)
