= List of Miami Dolphins head coaches =

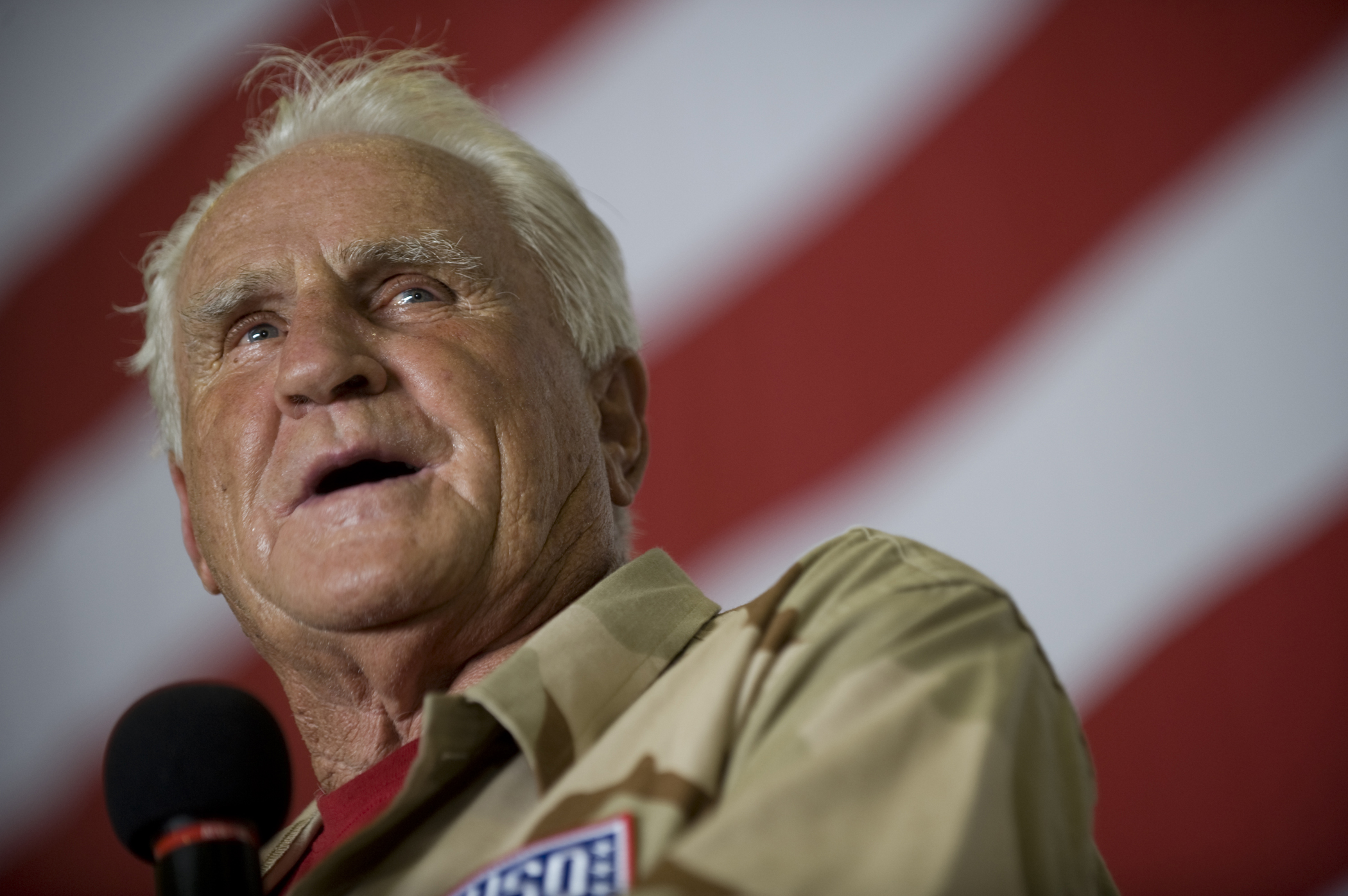
Don Shula on USO tour. He holds NFL record for wins.

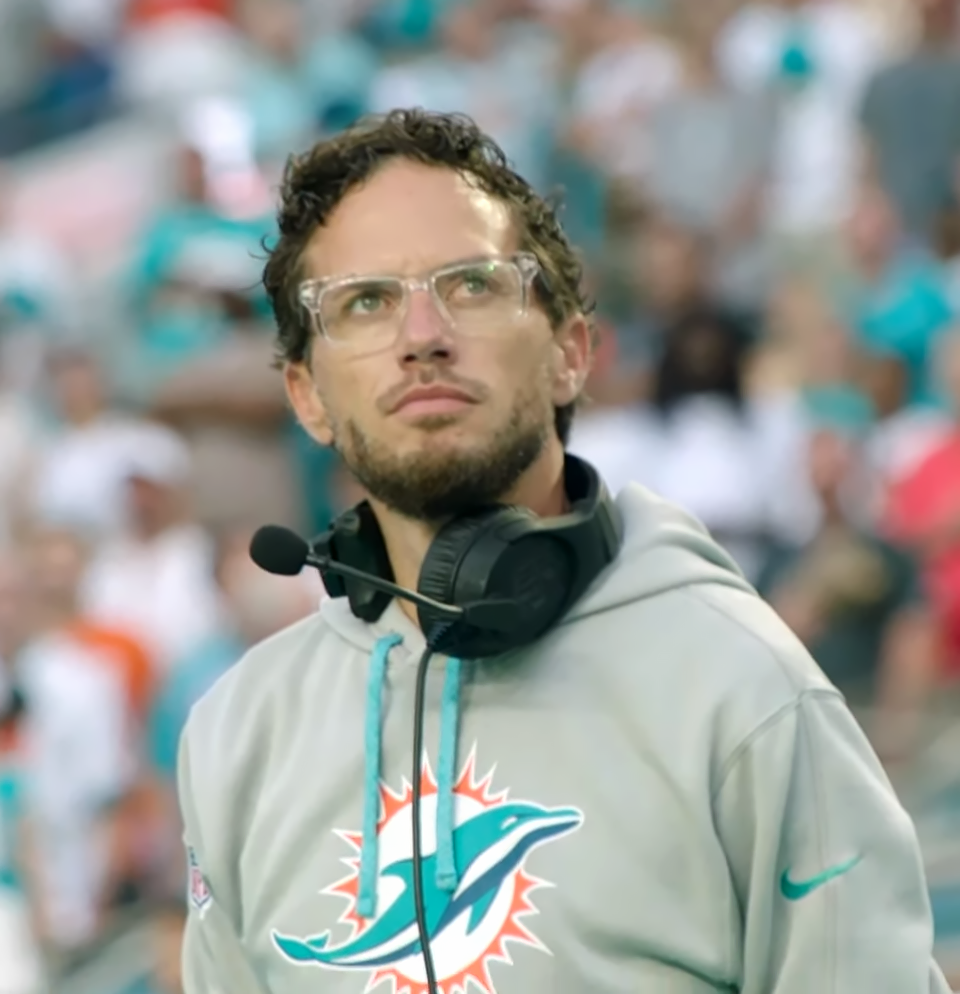
Mike McDaniel, hired in 2022, was the team's head coach from 2022 to 2025.

The Miami Dolphins are a professional American football franchise based in Miami Gardens, Florida. They are members of the East Division of the American Football Conference (AFC) in the National Football League (NFL). The Dolphins began play in 1966 as an expansion team in the American Football League (AFL), and joined the NFL as part of the AFL–NFL merger. The team has played their home games at Hard Rock Stadium, originally known as Joe Robbie Stadium, Pro Player Stadium, Dolphins Stadium, Dolphin Stadium, Landshark Stadium, and Sun Life Stadium, since 1987. The Dolphins are currently owned by Stephen M. Ross.

There have been fifteen head coaches for the Dolphins franchise. The team's first head coach was George Wilson, who coached for four complete seasons. Don Shula, who coached the Dolphins for 26 consecutive seasons, is the franchise's all-time leader for the most regular-season games coached (392), the most regular-season game wins (257), the most playoff games coached (31), and the most playoff-game wins (17). Shula is also the only Dolphins head coach to win a Super Bowl with the team, winning two. He was named NFL Coach of the Year by the Associated Press (AP), The Sporting News (TSN), Pro Football Weekly (PFW), and United Press International (UPI) during his tenure with the Dolphins. The current head coach of the Dolphins, Jeff Hafley, was hired on January 19, 2026.

== Key ==
#	Number of coaches (Note: A running total of the number of coaches of the Dolphins. Thus, any coach who has two or more terms as head coach is only counted once.)
Yrs	Years coached
First	First season coached
Last	Last season coached
GC	Games Coached
W	Wins
L	Loses
T	Ties
Win%	Win – Loss percentage
†	Elected into the Pro Football Hall of Fame as a coach
*	Spent entire NFL head coaching career with the Dolphins

== Coaches ==
Note: Statistics are accurate through the conclusion of the 2025 NFL season.

#	Image	Name	Term (Note: Each year is linked to an article about that particular NFL season.)			Regular season					Playoffs				Accomplishments	Ref.
#	Image	Name	Yrs	First	Last	GC	W	L	T	W%	GC	W	L	W%	Accomplishments	Ref.
1		George Wilson	4	1966	1969	56	15	39	2	.286	—					
2		Don Shula ^{†}	26	1970	1995	392	257	133	2	.658	31	17	14	.548	Inducted Pro Football Hall of Fame (1997); 2 Super Bowl championships (VII, VIII); 5 AFC championships (1971, 1972, 1973, 1982, 1984); 11 AFC East championships (1971, 1972, 1973, 1974, 1979, 1981, 1983, 1984, 1985, 1992, 1994); 16 Playoff Berths; AP NFL Coach of the Year (1972); Sporting News NFL Coach of the Year (1970, 1972); Pro Football Weekly NFL Coach of the Year (1970, 1972); UPI AFC Coach of the Year (1971)	
3		Jimmy Johnson ^{†}	4	1996	1999	64	36	28	0	.563	5	2	3	.400	Inducted Pro Football Hall of Fame (2020); 3 Playoff Berths	
4		Dave Wannstedt	5	2000	2004 (Note: Dave Wannstedt resigned during the bye week with a 1–8 record. Defensive coordinator Jim Bates served as interim head coach for the remaining 7 games.)	73	42	31	0	.575	3	1	2	.333	AFC East championship (2000); 2 Playoff Berths	
5		Jim Bates*	1	2004		7	3	4	0	.429	—					
6		Nick Saban*	2	2005	2006	32	15	17	0	.469	—					
7		Cam Cameron*	1	2007		16	1	15	0	.063	—					
8		Tony Sparano	4	2008	2011 (Note: After the Dolphins dropped to a 4–9 record, Tony Sparano was fired. Assistant coach Todd Bowles served as interim head coach for the remaining 3 games.)	61	29	32	0	.475	1	0	1	.000	AFC East championship (2008); 1 Playoff Berth	
9		Todd Bowles	1	2011		3	2	1	0	.667	—					
10		Joe Philbin	4	2012	2015 (Note: After the Dolphins started with a 1−3 record, Joe Philbin was fired. Tight ends coach Dan Campbell served as interim head coach for the remaining 12 games.)	52	24	28	0	.462	—					
11		Dan Campbell	1	2015		12	5	7	0	.417	—					
12		Adam Gase	3	2016	2018	48	23	25	0	.479	1	0	1	.000	1 Playoff Berth	
13		Brian Flores*	3	2019	2021	49	24	25	0	.490	—					
14		Mike McDaniel*	4	2022	2025	68	35	33	0	.515	2	0	2	.000	2 Playoff Berths	
15		Jeff Hafley*	1	2026	present	0	0	0	0	–	—					
Totals			60	1966	2025	933	511	418	4	.550	43	20	23	.465		
