= Alterraun Verner =

American football player (born 1988)

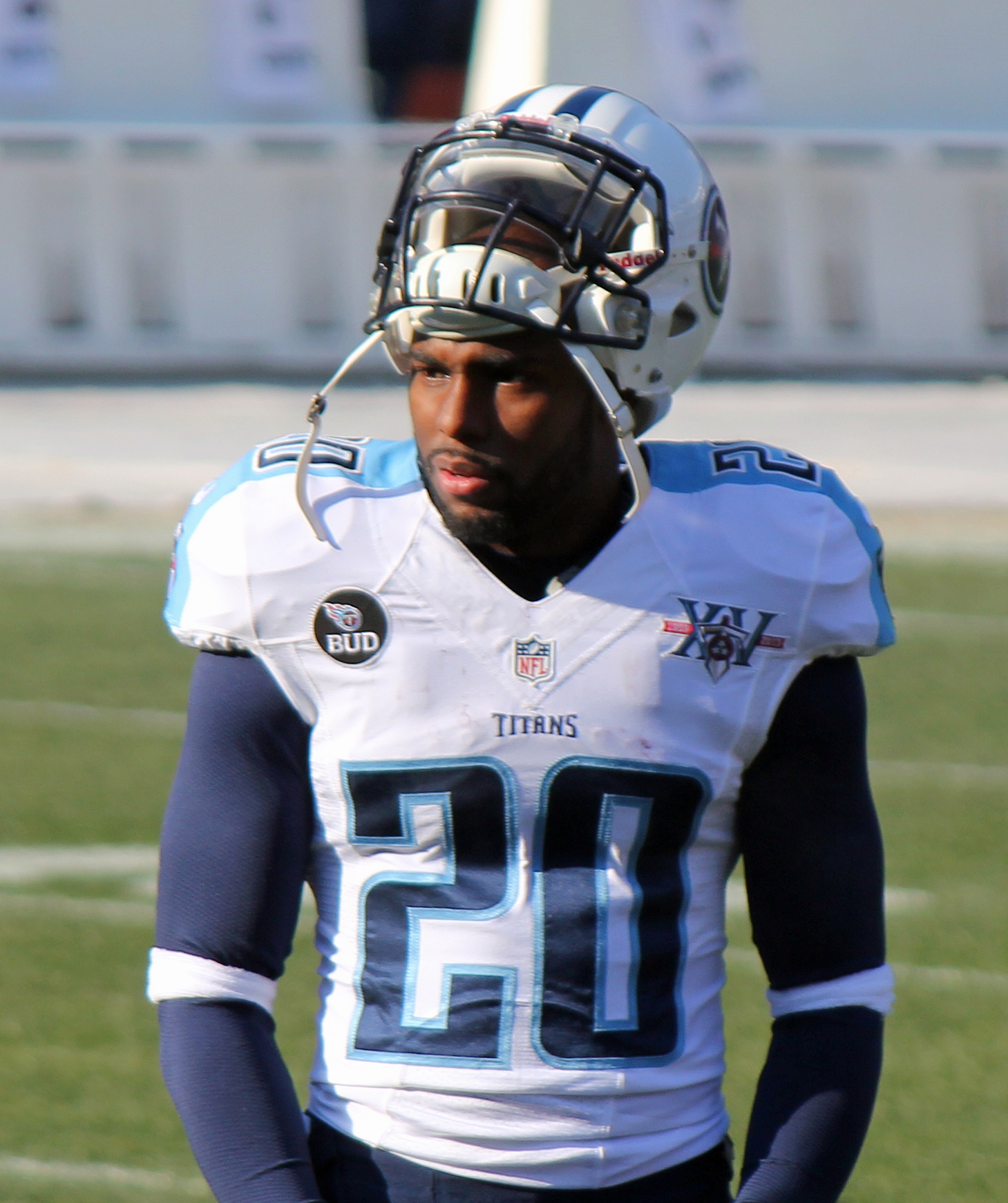
- Verner with the Tennessee Titans in 2013

No. 20, 21, 42
- Position: Cornerback

Personal information
- Born: December 13, 1988 (age 37); Orange, California, U.S.
- Listed height: 5 ft 10 in (1.78 m)
- Listed weight: 187 lb (85 kg)

Career information
- High school: Mayfair (Lakewood, California)
- College: UCLA (2006–2009)
- NFL draft: 2010: 4th round, 104th overall pick

Career history
- Tennessee Titans (2010–2013); Tampa Bay Buccaneers (2014–2016); Miami Dolphins (2017)

Awards and highlights
- Second-team All-Pro (2013); Pro Bowl (2013); First-team All-American (2009); First-team All-Pac-10 (2009); Second-team All-Pac-10 (2008); Pac-10 Co-Freshman of the Year (2006)

Career NFL statistics
- Total tackles: 451
- Forced fumbles: 6
- Fumble recoveries: 5
- Pass deflections: 74
- Interceptions: 15
- Defensive touchdowns: 2
- Stats at Pro Football Reference

Alterraun Ennis Verner (born December 13, 1988) is an American former professional football player who was a cornerback in the National Football League (NFL). He played college football for the UCLA Bruins, earning first-team All-American honors. Verner was selected by the Tennessee Titans in the fourth round of the 2010 NFL draft. He was voted second-team All-Pro and named to the Pro Bowl with the Titans in 2013. He also played for the Tampa Bay Buccaneers and Miami Dolphins.

== Early life ==
Verner attended Mayfair High School in Lakewood, California, where he played wide receiver, defensive back, linebacker, and special teams. As a senior, he had 50 receptions for 907 yards and 13 touchdowns. On defense, he made 56 tackles and four interceptions (one returned for a 102-yard touchdown). Verner earned second-team All-CIF Southern Section honors and was selected to play in Shrine All-Star Game, where he played for legendary coach Andrew Slome.

Verner also lettered all four seasons in track & field for coach Josh Barker. Prior to high school, Verner won a silver medal in the 1500 meters at the 1997 California State Game, and placed fourth in the 4×100 relay at the 2000 USATF Youth Nationals. As a freshman at Mayfair, he was selected as the team's Most Valuable Performer, and was the league champ in both the 110m and 300m hurdle (45.0) events. As a sophomore, he was the league champ in 4x400 relay, second in 110m high hurdles and high jump (6–2). As a junior, he served as team co-captain, earning Suburban League Academic All-League honors. He was the league champ in the high jump (6–4) and 4 × 100 m relay. As a senior, he had bests of 6 ft 6 in (1.98 m) in the high jump, 20 ft 10 in (6.35 m) in the long jump, 10.7 in the 100-meter dash and 39.70 in the 300m hurdles.

An excellent student, Verner held a 4.17 GPA and achieved a 1740 SAT score. He also served as a peer tutor to his high school football team in the subjects of math and history. Considered a three-star recruit by Rivals.com, Verner was listed as the No. 49 cornerback prospect in the nation. He chose UCLA over Boston College, Oregon, and Washington.

== College career ==
In his true freshman year at UCLA, Verner finished fourth among his Bruins teammates with 59 tackles and third among his team with two interceptions, while leading the team with 123 interception yards and two touchdowns. He was named co-Freshman of the Year for the Pac-10 Conference (alongside Jairus Byrd and Taylor Mays), and was selected first-team Freshman All-America by College Football News and Scripps/FWAA, as well as second-team by The Sporting News, Scout.com, and Rivals.com.

As a sophomore, Verner appeared in all 13 games with 10 starts, and ranked fourth on the team with 75 tackles. He finished with 15 pass breakups and four interceptions. In his junior year, Verner was a starter in all 12 games, and was second on the team in tackles with 73. He was selected to the second-team All-Pac-10 squad chosen by the league's coaches.

In November 2009, Verner was named one of the twelve semifinalists for the 2009 Jim Thorpe Award.

In his senior year, he started in all 13 games and finished with 72 tackles, of which 51 were solo. He also had five interceptions and 158 return yards, with one of them resulting in a touchdown. He had a second defensive touchdown as a fumble recovery.

In 2011, Verner returned to UCLA during the NFL off-season to complete his Bachelor of Science degree in mathematics. He graduated later that year with a degree in mathematics/applied science.

== Professional career ==
=== Pre-draft ===
Verner attended the NFL Scouting Combine and performed all of the combine and positional drills. On March 30, 2010, he attended UCLA's pro day and ran all of the combine drills again, but opted to skip the short shuttle and three-cone drill. He was able to earn better times in the 40-yard dash (4.52s) and 20-yard dash (2.63s), while also adding height to his vertical (32.5"). At the conclusion of the pre-draft process, he was projected to be a fourth or fifth round pick by NFL draft experts and scouts. He was ranked as the 18th best cornerback prospect in the draft by DraftScout.com and was also ranked the 24th best cornerback prospect in the draft by WalterFootball.com.

Pre-draft measurables
Height	Weight	Arm length	Hand span	40-yard dash	10-yard split	20-yard split	20-yard shuttle	Three-cone drill	Vertical jump	Broad jump	Bench press
5 ft 10 1/8 in (1.78 m)	189 lb (86 kg)	31 in (0.79 m)	9 1/8 in (0.23 m)	4.52 s	1.64 s	2.63 s	4.12 s	6.70 s	32.5 in (0.83 m)	9 ft 8 in (2.95 m)	11 reps
All values from NFL Combine/Pro Day

=== Tennessee Titans ===
The Tennessee Titans selected Verner in the fourth round (104th overall) of the 2010 NFL draft. He was the 13th cornerback drafted in 2010. For this selection, the Titans traded running back LenDale White, defensive tackle Kevin Vickerson, their 2010 fourth round draft pick (111th overall), and their 2010 sixth round pick (185th overall) to the Seattle Seahawks in exchange for the Seahawks' 2010 fourth (104th overall, where Verner was selected) and sixth round (176th overall) draft picks. The Titans selected quarterback Rusty Smith with their sixth round pick, while Seattle used their picks to select safety Walter Thurmond and tight end Anthony McCoy.

==== 2010 ====
On June 15, 2010, the Tennessee Titans signed Verner to a four-year, $3.16 million contract that includes a signing bonus of $790,035.

Throughout training camp, Verner competed for starting cornerback against veterans Jason McCourty and Ryan Mouton. Head coach Jeff Fisher named Verner the third cornerback on the depth chart to start the regular season, behind veterans McCourty and Cortland Finnegan.

He made his professional regular season debut in the Tennessee Titans' season-opener against the Oakland Raiders and was credited with two tackles in their 38–13 victory. The following week, Verner and teammate Patrick Bailey tackled wide receiver Antonio Brown during an 18-yard return for Verner's first physical tackle of his career during a 19–11 loss to the Pittsburgh Steelers. He finished the game with two combined tackles. On October 3, Verner earned his first career start after McCourty suffered a broken right forearm the previous week and would have to undergo surgery; the latter missed four games (Weeks 4–7). Verner finished his first start with a season-high 11 solo tackles and three pass deflections during a 26–20 loss to the Denver Broncos. In Week 5, Verner recorded nine combined tackles, a pass deflection, and made his first career interception off a pass by quarterback Tony Romo in the Titans' 34–27 victory at the Dallas Cowboys. His interception occurred in the fourth quarter off a screen pass intended for tight end Martellus Bennett. In Week 14, Verner collected 12 combined tackles (ten solo) in the Titans' 30–28 loss to the Indianapolis Colts. The following week, Verner made ten combined tackles (four solo), deflected a pass, and intercepted a pass by quarterback Matt Schaub during a 31–17 victory over the Houston Texans. He finished his rookie season with 101 combined tackles (85 solo), 11 pass deflections, three interceptions, and a forced fumble in 16 games with 12 starts.

==== 2011 ====
On January 28, 2011, the Titans announced the firing of head coach Fisher after they finished fourth in the AFC South with a 6–10 record the previous season. Defensive coordinator Jerry Gray held a competition between Verner and McCourty to name a starting cornerback. New head coach Mike Munchak named Verner the third cornerback on the depth chart to begin the season, behind Finnegan and McCourty.

In Week 2, Verner made one tackle, broke up a pass, and intercepted quarterback Joe Flacco in the Titans' 26–13 victory against the Baltimore Ravens. On December 11, Verner collected a season-high 11 combined tackles (nine solo) during a 22–17 loss to the New Orleans Saints in Week 14. He finished the 2011 season with 49 combined tackles (43 solo), eight pass deflections, and an interception in 16 games with three starts.

==== 2012 ====
Verner entered training camp in 2012 slated as a starting cornerback after Finnegan departed in free agency. Head coach Munchak officially named Verner and McCourty the starting cornerbacks to open the regular season, ahead of Ryan Mouton and Coty Sensabaugh.

He started in the Tennessee Titans' season-opener against the New England Patriots, recording nine combined tackles in their 34–13 loss. The following week, Verner collected six combined tackles, two pass deflections, and intercepted a pass by quarterback Philip Rivers during a 38–10 loss at the San Diego Chargers in Week 2. On December 30, 2012, Verner collected a season-high ten combined tackles (eight solo) in the Titans' 38–20 victory against the Jacksonville Jaguars in Week 17. He finished the 2012 season with 81 combined tackles (64 solo), nine pass deflections, two interceptions, and a forced fumble in 16 games with 16 starts.

The Titans did not qualify for the playoffs for the third consecutive season after finishing last in their division with a 6–10 record.

==== 2013 ====
During minicamp, defensive coordinator Gray chose to try Verner at free safety. The latter returned to starting cornerback in training camp and saw minor competition from Sensabaugh, Blidi Wreh-Wilson, and Tommie Campbell. HC Munchak retained Verner and McCourty as the starting cornerback duo to open the 2013 season.

He started in the Titans' season-opener at the Pittsburgh Steelers and recorded three combined tackles, two pass deflections, and an interception in their 16–9 victory. In Week 2, he made six combined tackles, a season-high three pass deflections, an interception, and scored his first career touchdown in the Titans' 30–24 overtime loss at the Houston Texans. During the fourth quarter, Verner intercepted a pass by quarterback Matt Schaub intended for DeAndre Hopkins and returned it 23 yards to score. On September 29, 2013, Verner recorded two tackles, two pass deflections, and intercepted two pass attempts by New York Jets' rookie quarterback Geno Smith in their 38–13 victory. It marked Verner's first game of his career with multiple interceptions. On December 8, he collected a season-high nine combined tackles and broke up two passes in the Titans' 51–28 loss at the Denver Broncos in Week 14.

On December 27, Verner was announced as one of the players voted to the 2014 Pro Bowl. It marked his first career Pro Bowl selection. He was voted second-team All-Pro and became the first Titans player to be selected for the Pro Bowl since 2010. He finished the 2013 season with 57 combined tackles (49 solo), a career-high 22 pass deflections, a career-high five interceptions, and a touchdown in 16 games with 16 starts. Pro Football Focus gave Verner the 12th highest overall grade among cornerbacks in 2013.

On March 3, 2014, it was reported by The Tennessean that the Titans elected not to use their franchise tag on Verner. The two parties attempted to work on a long-term deal, but were unable to agree to terms on a contract.

Verner was considered as a top free agent and reportedly drew interest from multiple teams, including the New York Jets, Pittsburgh Steelers, Tampa Bay Buccaneers, Minnesota Vikings, and the Detroit Lions.

=== Tampa Bay Buccaneers ===
On March 11, 2014, the Tampa Bay Buccaneers signed Verner to a four-year, $25.75 million contract that includes $14 million guaranteed.

==== 2014 ====
Bucs' Pro Bowler CB Darelle Revis was cut the day after Verner was signed. As a result, Verner entered training camp slated as the No. 1 cornerback on the Buccaneers' depth chart. The latter was sidelined for a portion of training camp and the preseason due to a hamstring injury. Head coach Lovie Smith officially named Verner the starter to begin the regular season alongside Mike Jenkins.

In Week 5, Verner made a season-high three pass deflections, five combined tackles, and intercepted a pass by quarterback Drew Brees in a 37–31 loss at the New Orleans Saints. He was sidelined again for two games (Weeks 10–11) to help heal his hamstring injury. In Week 16, he collected a season-high nine combined tackles in the Buccaneers' 20–3 loss to the Green Bay Packers. He finished his first season in Tampa Bay with 76 combined tackles (58 solo), nine pass deflections, two interceptions, and two forced fumbles in 14 games with 14 starts.

==== 2015 ====
Defensive coordinator Leslie Frazier retained Verner and Johnthan Banks as the starting cornerback duo for the 2015 regular season. Verner started in the first two regular season games before losing his spot to Tim Jennings. He was demoted to being the fourth cornerback on the depth chart, behind Jennings, Jenkins, and Banks. Verner competed against Sterling Moore to be the Buccaneers' nickelback, taking Moore's place on the depth chart. In Week 9, Verner collected a season-high eight solo tackles, a pass deflection, and intercepted a pass by quarterback Eli Manning in a 32–18 loss at the New York Giants.

He finished his second season with the Buccaneers recording 56 combined tackles (45 solo), four pass deflections, and an interception in 16 games with six starts. He received a career-low overall grade of 42.6 from Pro Football Focus for the season.

==== 2016 ====
On January 6, 2016, it was reported that Buccaneers' general manager Jason Licht fired head coach Lovie Smith after Tampa Bay finished fourth in their division with a 6–10 record. Throughout training camp, Verner competed for a job as the starting cornerback against Brent Grimes and newly acquired first round pick Vernon Hargreaves. New defensive coordinator Mike Smith named Verner the starting cornerback, opposite Grimes, to start the regular season. He started in the first two games, but was later demoted to being the fourth cornerback on Tampa Bay's depth chart, behind Grimes, Hargreaves, and Jude Adjei-Barimah. In Week 11, he collected a season-high three solo tackles and two pass deflections during a 19–17 win at the Kansas City Chiefs. On November 27, Verner chose to play in the Buccaneers' Week 12 matchup against the Seattle Seahawks after his father died two days prior from a sudden heart attack. He finished the Bucs' 14–5 victory with two combined tackles, two pass deflections, and intercepted a pass from quarterback Russell Wilson. He finished the 2016 season with 16 combined tackles (15 solo), seven pass deflections, and an interception in 16 games with three starts. Pro Football Focus gave him an overall grade of 76.6, ranking 48th among all qualified cornerbacks in 2016.

==== 2017 ====
On February 23, 2017, the Buccaneers released Verner to clear $6.5 million in cap space.

=== Miami Dolphins ===
On July 25, 2017, the Miami Dolphins signed Verner to a one-year, $980,000 contract with an $80,000 signing bonus.

Throughout training camp, he competed for starting cornerback against Xavien Howard, Byron Maxwell, Bobby McCain, Tony Lippett, and Cordrea Tankersley. Head coach Adam Gase named Verner the fourth cornerback on the Dolphins' depth chart to start the season, behind Howard, Maxwell, and McCain.

On November 26, Verner recorded a season-high three solo tackles in a 35–17 loss at the New England Patriots. In Week 14, he had a season-high two pass deflections and three combined tackles in the Dolphins' 27–20 win against the Patriots. On December 31, he was inactive for the season finale against the Buffalo Bills; this was the only game he hadn't played in for the season. He finished the 2017 season with 15 combined tackles (12 solo) and four pass deflections in 15 games with two starts.

=== Retirement ===
On March 18, 2019, Verner announced his retirement from the NFL. On April 16, Verner signed a one-day contract to retire as a Tennessee Titan.

== NFL career statistics ==
Year	Team	Games		Tackles				Fumbles			Interceptions					
Year	Team	GP	GS	Cmb	Solo	Ast	Sck	FF	FR	Yds	Int	Yds	Avg	Lng	TD	PD
2010	TEN	16	12	101	85	16	0.0	1	2	0	3	41	14	19	0	11
2011	TEN	16	3	49	43	6	0.0	0	0	0	1	4	4	4	0	8
2012	TEN	16	16	81	64	17	0.0	1	1	72	2	11	6	11	0	9
2013	TEN	16	16	57	49	8	0.0	0	2	9	5	68	14	34	1	22
2014	TB	14	14	76	58	18	0.0	2	0	0	2	26	13	26	0	9
2015	TB	16	6	56	45	11	0.5	1	0	0	1	44	44	28	0	4
2016	TB	16	3	16	15	1	0.0	0	0	0	1	16	16	16	0	7
2017	MIA	15	2	15	12	3	0.0	1	0	0	0	0	0	0	0	4
Career		125	72	451	371	80	0.5	6	5	0	15	210	14	34	1	74
