= Andrew Franks =

American football player (born 1993)

No. 3
- Position: Placekicker

Personal information
- Born: January 11, 1993 (age 33); Carmel, California, U.S.
- Listed height: 6 ft 1 in (1.85 m)
- Listed weight: 204 lb (93 kg)

Career information
- High school: Carmel
- College: Rensselaer
- NFL draft: 2015: undrafted

Career history
- Miami Dolphins (2015–2016); Orlando Apollos (2019)*; Tampa Bay Vipers (2020)
- * Offseason or practice squad member only

Career NFL statistics
- Field goals: 29
- Field goal attempts: 37
- Field goal percentage: 78.4
- Longest field goal: 55
- Stats at Pro Football Reference

Andrew Franks (born January 11, 1993) is an American former professional football player who was a placekicker in the National Football League (NFL). He was signed by the Miami Dolphins as an undrafted free agent in 2015. He played college football for the RPI Engineers.

== College career ==
Franks attended Rensselaer Polytechnic Institute (RPI), a Division III school, from 2011 to 2014. He was twice named first-team All-American by D3football.com, one of two All-America teams recognized in the NCAA record book. He received a bachelor's degree in biomedical engineering.

== Professional career ==
=== Miami Dolphins ===
In May 2015, the Miami Dolphins signed Franks as an undrafted free agent to compete along with Caleb Sturgis. On September 5, 2015, Franks won the job, after Sturgis was released. At the end of the 2015 season, Franks had converted 81.2% of his field goals (13-of-16) and kicked 33 extra points.

Franks remained the Dolphins' kicker during the 2016 season. During Week 14, he made his first game-winning field goal, kicking a 21-yard field goal to win the game 26–23 over the Arizona Cardinals with 1 second remaining on the clock. In Week 16, he hit his career high field goal from 55 yards against the Buffalo Bills on December 24, 2016 to tie the game at 31–31 with 10 seconds remaining. Franks later kicked a 27-yard field goal late in overtime to win the game. On September 3, 2017, he was waived by the Dolphins.

=== Tampa Bay Vipers ===
In October 2019, Franks was selected by the Tampa Bay Vipers of the XFL in the open phase of the 2020 XFL draft. He had his contract terminated when the league suspended operations on April 10, 2020.
