= Jordan Lucas =

American football player (born 1993)

Jordan A. Lucas
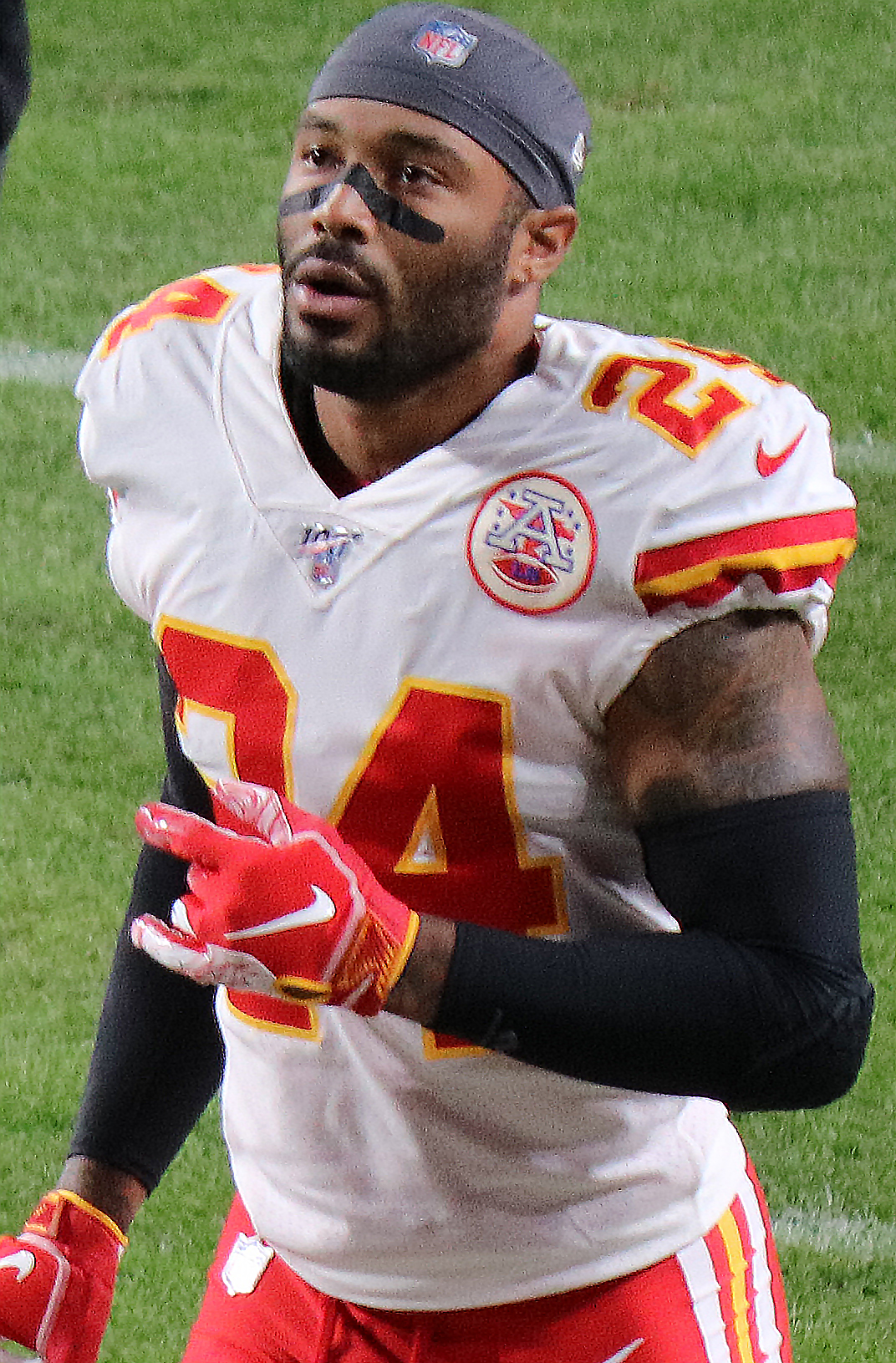
- Lucas with the Kansas City Chiefs in 2019

No. 21, 24, 29
- Position: Safety

Personal information
- Born: August 2, 1993 (age 33); New Rochelle, New York, U.S.
- Listed height: 6 ft 1 in (1.85 m)
- Listed weight: 190 lb (86 kg)

Career information
- High school: New Rochelle (NY); Worcester Academy (MA)
- College: Penn State
- NFL draft: 2016: 6th round, 204th overall pick

Career history
- Miami Dolphins (2016–2017); Kansas City Chiefs (2018–2019); Chicago Bears (2020); Indianapolis Colts (2021); Edmonton Elks (2023)*
- * Offseason or practice squad member only

Awards and highlights
- Super Bowl champion (LIV)

Career NFL statistics
- Total tackles: 47
- Sacks: 1.0
- Pass deflections: 3
- Interceptions: 1
- Stats at Pro Football Reference

Jordan A. Lucas (born August 2, 1993) is an American former professional football player who was a safety in the National Football League (NFL). He played college football for the Penn State Nittany Lions. He was selected by the Miami Dolphins in the sixth round of the 2016 NFL draft.

== Early life ==
Lucas played at New Rochelle High School for coach Lou DiRienzo and then played one season at Worcester Academy in Worcester, Massachusetts. While at Worcester Academy, Lucas played defensive back and running back for coach David Dykeman and was selected the AA South Section Back of the Year as a senior.

Lucas was rated as a three-star prospect by both Scout and Rivals coming out of high school.

== College career ==
Lucas played at Pennsylvania State University from 2012 to 2015 playing both cornerback and safety. He started out on defense and special teams as one of only six true freshmen in 2012. He played primarily at the cornerback position from 2013 to 2014 during his sophomore and junior seasons before switching to play safety for his senior season in 2015. His senior season was cut short due to injury. During his career, he had 181 tackles, 3 interceptions, 11 tackles for loss, and 4 sacks.

=== Career statistics ===
Year	Team	Tackles							Interceptions				Fumbles		
Year	Team	GP	GS	Tot	Solo	Asst	Loss	Sck	Int	YDS	Avg	Lng	TD	PD	FF
2012	Penn State	1	0	1	1	0	0.0	0	0	0	0	0	0	0	0
2013	Penn State	12	11	65	45	20	4.5	1.0	3	37	12.3	0	0	13	2
2014	Penn State	13	13	59	39	20	4.0	2.0	0	0	0	0	0	9	0
2015	Penn State	9	9	56	34	22	2.5	1.0	0	0	0	0	0	3	0
Totals		35	33	181	119	62	11	4	3	37	12.3	0	0	25	2

== Professional career ==
Pre-draft measurables
Height	Weight	Arm length	Hand span
5 ft 11 5/8 in (1.82 m)	201 lb (91 kg)	30 1/8 in (0.77 m)	10 in (0.25 m)
All values from NFL Combine

=== Miami Dolphins ===
Lucas was selected by the Miami Dolphins in the sixth round with the 204th overall pick in the 2016 NFL draft. He played in eight games as a rookie recording two tackles.

On September 2, 2017, Lucas was waived by the Dolphins and was signed to the practice squad the next day. He was promoted to the active roster on October 3, 2017.

=== Kansas City Chiefs ===
On August 31, 2018, Lucas was traded to the Kansas City Chiefs for a 2020 seventh-round draft pick. Lucas, who became a restricted free agent following the end of the season, received an original round tender. On April 15, 2019, he officially signed the one-year $1.323 million tender. Lucas won Super Bowl LIV with the Chiefs after defeating the San Francisco 49ers 31–20.

=== Chicago Bears ===
Lucas signed with the Chicago Bears on March 26, 2020. He chose to opt-out of the 2020 season due to the COVID-19 pandemic on August 3, 2020.

On August 24, 2021, Lucas was placed on injured reserve. He was removed from injured reserve with an injury settlement on September 1, 2021.

=== Indianapolis Colts ===
On September 29, 2021, Lucas was signed to the Indianapolis Colts practice squad. He appeared in one regular season game was released on November 16.

=== Edmonton Elks ===
On May 19, 2023, Lucas signed with the Edmonton Elks of the Canadian Football League (CFL). On May 28, 2023, Lucas was released by the Elks.
