= Matt Burke (American football) =

American football player and coach (born 1976)

Houston Texans
- Title: Defensive coordinator

Personal information
- Born: March 25, 1976 (age 50); Hudson, Massachusetts, U.S.

Career information
- Position: Safety
- College: Dartmouth

Career history
- Bridgton Academy (1998–1999) Assistant coach; Boston College (2000–2002) Graduate assistant; Harvard (2003) Assistant coach; Tennessee Titans (2004–2008); Administrative assistant (2004–2005); Defense quality control coach (2006–2008); Detroit Lions (2009–2013) Linebackers coach; Cincinnati Bengals (2014–2015) Linebackers coach; Miami Dolphins (2016–2018); Linebackers coach (2016); Defensive coordinator (2017–2018); Philadelphia Eagles (2019–2020); Defensive special assistant (2019); Run game coordinator/defensive line coach (2020); New York Jets (2021) Game management coach; Arizona Cardinals (2022) Defensive line coach; Houston Texans (2023–present) Defensive coordinator
- Coaching profile at Pro Football Reference

Matt Burke (born March 25, 1976) is an American professional football coach who is the defensive coordinator for the Houston Texans of the National Football League (NFL). He was also previously the run game coordinator/defensive line coach for the Philadelphia Eagles, defensive coordinator for the Miami Dolphins, the linebackers coach for the Detroit Lions and Cincinnati Bengals, an assistant with the Tennessee Titans, and a defensive line coach for the Arizona Cardinals.

== Playing career ==
Burke played safety at Dartmouth and was part of an undefeated Ivy League championship team in 1996.

== Coaching career ==
=== Miami Dolphins ===
Burke was promoted to defensive coordinator, from the linebackers coach on January 12, 2017, after Vance Joseph left to become the head coach of the Denver Broncos. Burke was not retained by the Dolphins after they hired Brian Flores as their new head coach in February 2019.

=== Philadelphia Eagles ===
Burke became a defensive special assistant with the Philadelphia Eagles on February 25, 2019. He was promoted to run game coordinator and defensive line coach on February 5, 2020.

Following the 2020 season, in which the Eagles went 4–11–1, it was reported that Pederson sought to potentially promote Burke to defensive coordinator, along with other staff changes. However, the Eagles fired Pederson, and Burke was not retained by new head coach Nick Sirianni and defensive cordinator Jonathan Gannon.

=== New York Jets ===
On May 6, 2021, the New York Jets hired Burke as a Game management coach.

=== Arizona Cardinals ===
Burke was hired as an Arizona Cardinals defensive line coach on May 19, 2022.

=== Houston Texans ===
Burke was announced as the new defensive coordinator for the Houston Texans under new head coach DeMeco Ryans on February 10, 2023.

== Personal life ==
Burke was born in Hudson, Massachusetts. Burke spent the off-season in Africa in 2015 and 2016. He climbed Mount Kilimanjaro, has gone on safari in Botswana and has done charity work in Uganda.
