= Adam Gase =

American football coach (born 1978)

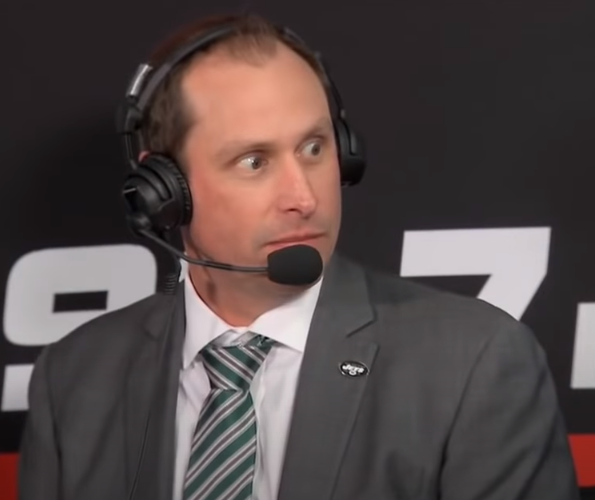
- Gase with the New York Jets in 2019

Los Angeles Chargers
- Title: Passing game specialist

Personal information
- Born: March 29, 1978 (age 48); Ypsilanti, Michigan, U.S.

Career information
- High school: Marshall (MI)
- College: Michigan State

Career history

Coaching
- LSU (2000–2002); Graduate assistant (2000); Defensive assistant (2001–2002); Detroit Lions (2005–2007); Offensive assistant (2005–2006); Quarterbacks coach (2007); San Francisco 49ers (2008) Offensive assistant; Denver Broncos (2009–2014); Wide receivers coach (2009–2010); Quarterbacks coach (2011–2012); Offensive coordinator (2013–2014); Chicago Bears (2015) Offensive coordinator; Miami Dolphins (2016–2018) Head coach; New York Jets (2019–2020) Head coach; Los Angeles Chargers (2026–present) Passing game specialist

Operations
- LSU (2001–2002) Recruiting assistant; Detroit Lions (2003–2005) Scouting assistant; New York Jets (2019) Interim general manager

Head coaching record
- Regular season: 32–48 (.400)
- Postseason: 0–1 (.000)
- Career: 32–49 (.395)
- Coaching profile at Pro Football Reference

Adam Joseph Gase (born March 29, 1978) is an American professional football coach who is currently the pass game coordinator for the Los Angeles Chargers of the National Football League (NFL). He was the offensive coordinator for the Denver Broncos from 2013 to 2014, whose offense set the NFL record for points scored in 2013 and helped the team reach Super Bowl XLVIII. Following this success, Gase served as the head coach of the Miami Dolphins from 2016 to 2018 and the New York Jets from 2019 to 2020.

== Playing career ==
Gase played high school football for Marshall High School.

== Coaching career ==
=== Michigan State ===
Gase began his coaching career at Michigan State while an undergraduate student. He was a student assistant to the coaching staff.

=== LSU ===
When Gase graduated from Michigan State, he followed coach Nick Saban to LSU for the 2000 season. In Gase's first season with LSU, he worked as a defensive graduate assistant and worked with recruiting. For the next two seasons, Gase worked full-time as a recruiting assistant for the Tigers.

=== Detroit Lions ===
Gase left LSU and the college ranks to become a scouting assistant for the Detroit Lions. He was hired by Steve Mariucci. Gase worked as a scouting assistant from 2003 to 2005. He also added the role of offensive assistant for the 2005 season.

Gase stayed with the Lions under new head coach Rod Marinelli and was promoted to the team's offensive quality control coach for the 2006 season. In 2007, Mike Martz promoted Gase to the team's quarterbacks coach.

=== San Francisco 49ers ===
In 2008, Gase joined Mike Martz as an offensive assistant coach for the San Francisco 49ers as the team went 7–9.

=== Denver Broncos ===
As the offensive coordinator of the Denver Broncos under John Fox, Gase was on the sidelines during Peyton Manning's record-breaking passing season in 2013. Gase and the Broncos appeared in Super Bowl XLVIII but fell to the Seattle Seahawks in a 43–8 blowout loss. After the successful 2013 season, Gase stayed on as the offensive coordinator for the 2014 season. After Fox was fired after their loss to the Indianapolis Colts in the playoffs, he was not retained by new head coach Gary Kubiak.

=== Chicago Bears ===
After the Chicago Bears hired Fox as their new head coach, Gase joined the team as his offensive coordinator once again. In Gase's only season as the Bears offensive coordinator, the team finished 18th in total offense, while also recording 5,514 total net yards and 344.6 per game. The Bears finished 6–10.

=== Miami Dolphins ===
The Miami Dolphins announced that Gase would be the 12th head coach in franchise history on January 9, 2016. He is the first to be born after the team was founded in 1966. The Dolphins started the season with a 1–4 record, but would follow that up with a six-game winning streak. Gase finished his first season as head coach with a 10–6 record leading Miami to the playoffs for the first time since 2008. Miami finished second in the AFC East behind the eventual Super Bowl LI champion New England Patriots. In Gase's only playoff game as head coach, the Dolphins lost to the Pittsburgh Steelers by a score of 30–12 in the Wild Card Round.

Following a promising 2016 season, the Dolphins took a step back in 2017 finishing with a 6–10.

On December 31, 2018, a day after a 42–17 loss to the Buffalo Bills to close out the 2018 season, the Dolphins fired Gase as part of their organizational changes. He finished with a 23–25 regular-season record as Miami's head coach.

=== New York Jets ===
The New York Jets announced that Gase would be the 19th head coach in the team's history on January 11, 2019. On May 15, general manager Mike Maccagnan was fired and Gase was named interim general manager; Gase retained the role until Joe Douglas was hired as the permanent general manager on June 6.

In Gase's first year, the Jets stumbled to a 1–7 record through the first eight games with starting quarterback Sam Darnold missing three games after coming down with mononucleosis, but won six of their final eight games to finish at 7–9.

In his second year, Gase and the Jets started 0–13, the worst such start in franchise history. By the Week 7 matchup against the Buffalo Bills, Gase had relieved himself of offensive play calling duties in favor of offensive coordinator Dowell Loggains. It was rumored that Gase would return to calling offensive plays for the Week 12 game against the Miami Dolphins in the 20–3 loss. At the postgame press conference, Gase did not give a straightforward answer on who was calling the plays.

In Week 13, Gase fired defensive coordinator Gregg Williams for making the "Cover 0 blitz" play call that cost the Jets the win against the Las Vegas Raiders. After starting the season 0–13, the Jets won their first game of 2020 on December 20, defeating the Los Angeles Rams 23–20. The Jets finished the season at the bottom of the AFC East with a 2–14 record, one win better than their franchise-worst 1–15 record in 1996. On January 3, 2021, hours after the team's season-ending loss against the New England Patriots, Gase was fired by the Jets. Gase finished his tenure in New York with a 9–23 (.281) regular season record.

=== 2021–2025 ===
Following his dismissal by the Jets, Gase did not work in any recognized position in the NFL until 2026. During this stretch, he occasionally visited NFL teams to offer his insight into their operations. Most notably, Gase visited the Broncos' facility during the 2023 and 2025 offseasons, where his father-in-law Joe Vitt works as a defensive assistant. While head coach Sean Payton called Gase a "good resource" who was "welcome to come out", he was not formally part of the staff.

In 2024, he joined The 33rd Team as a strategic advisor alongside former NFL head coaches Bill Belichick and Matt Patricia. Gase also worked for Omaha Productions, assisting Peyton and Eli Manning in studying film for their Manningcast broadcasts.

=== Los Angeles Chargers ===
On February 20, 2026, Gase was hired by the Los Angeles Chargers to serve as a passing game specialist, replacing former passing game coordinator Marcus Brady.

== Personal life ==
Gase is married to Jennifer Vitt, the daughter of former NFL linebacker coach Joe Vitt. The couple have three children together. Gase is a fan of the Detroit Tigers.

On April 27, 2026, former NFL running back Le'Veon Bell, who played for the New York Jets when Gase was the head coach, made accusations about Gase that he saw his former head coach using cocaine in his office more than once. "I’m like, bro, I ain’t just walk in the office and see my coach [snorting cocaine]. It wasn’t just one time. That’s what it did, though. Everybody knows that. That’s what he did. But it was just crazy to me to actually see him doing it. I heard all the stories and s---" Bell said and also claims that Gase used the code name "white girl" for cocaine around players and others.

== Head coaching record ==
| Team | Year | Regular season | | | | | Postseason | | | |
| Team | Year | Won | Lost | Ties | Win % | Finish | Won | Lost | Win % | Result |
|---|---|---|---|---|---|---|---|---|---|---|
| MIA | 2016 | 10 | 6 | 0 | .625 | 2nd in AFC East | 0 | 1 | .000 | Lost to Pittsburgh Steelers in AFC wild card game |
| MIA | 2017 | 6 | 10 | 0 | .375 | 3rd in AFC East | — | — | — | — |
| MIA | 2018 | 7 | 9 | 0 | .438 | 2nd in AFC East | — | — | — | — |
| MIA total | | 23 | 25 | 0 | .479 | | 0 | 1 | .000 | |
| NYJ | 2019 | 7 | 9 | 0 | .438 | 3rd in AFC East | — | — | — | — |
| NYJ | 2020 | 2 | 14 | 0 | .125 | 4th in AFC East | — | — | — | — |
| NYJ total | | 9 | 23 | 0 | .281 | | 0 | 0 | .000 | |
| Total | | 32 | 48 | 0 | .400 | | 0 | 1 | .000 | |
