= 2017 Miami Dolphins season =

52nd season in franchise history

- Owner: Stephen M. Ross
- General manager: Chris Grier
- Head coach: Adam Gase
- Home stadium: Hard Rock Stadium

Results
- Record: 6–10
- Division place: 3rd AFC East
- Playoffs: Did not qualify
- Pro Bowlers: S Reshad Jones; WR Jarvis Landry

Uniform
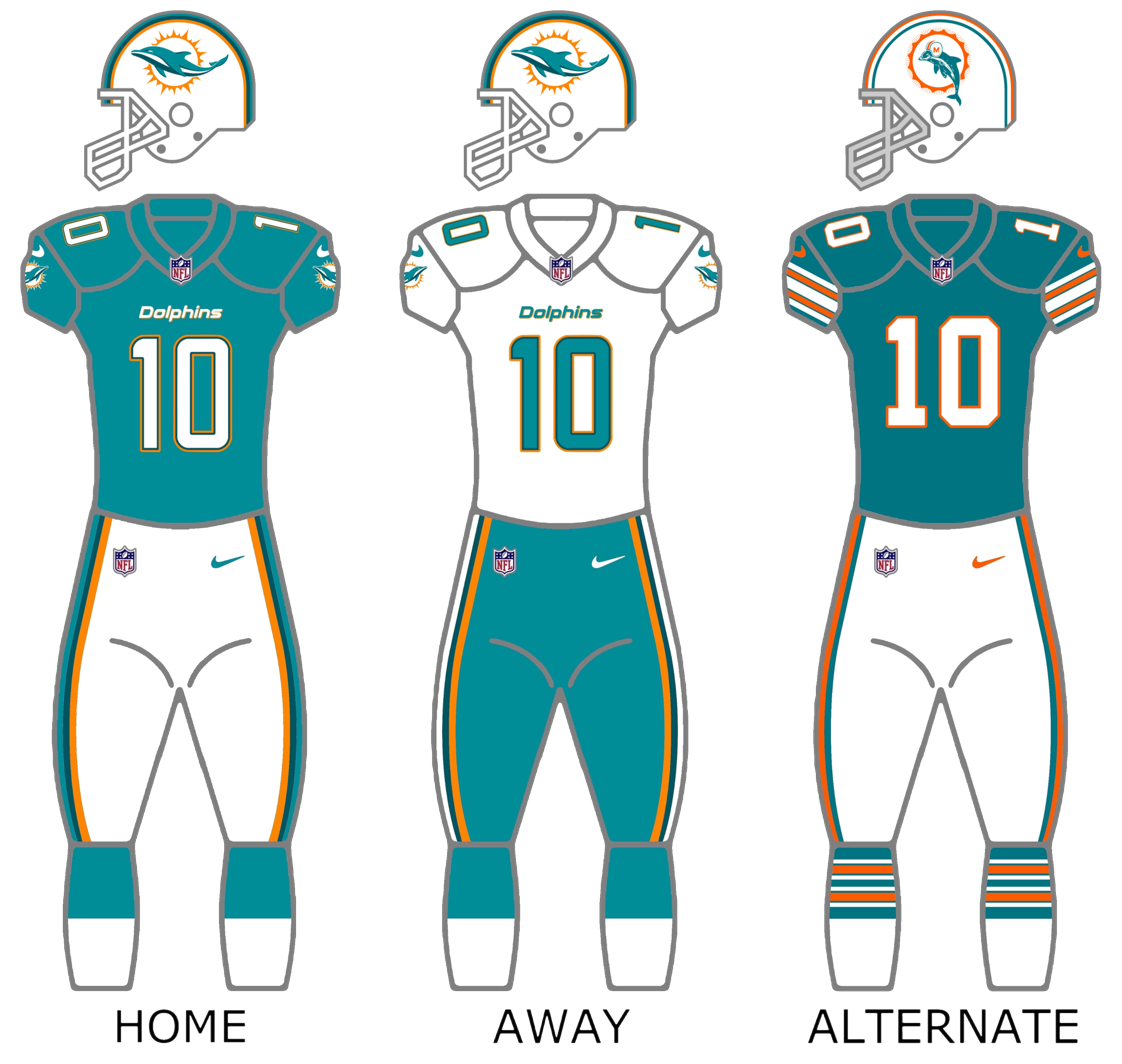

The 2017 season was the Miami Dolphins' 48th season in the National Football League (NFL), their 52nd overall, their second under general manager Chris Grier and their second under head coach Adam Gase. The team came off from a 10-6 record and a playoff appearance for the first time since 2008. They were seen as potential playoff contenders and looked to make consecutive playoff seasons for the first time since the 2000 and 2001 seasons. However, the team was affected by the loss of starting quarterback Ryan Tannehill, who tore his ACL during practice and was ruled out for the season. The team turned to former Bears quarterback Jay Cutler, who came out of retirement to become Tannehill's replacement and team's starter. After Tannehill got injured, coach Adam Gase called former Denver Broncos quarterback Peyton Manning about possibly coming out of retirement and taking Tannehill's place. However Manning later declined the idea of coming out of retirement. Gase was the QB coach and offensive coordinator of Peyton's Broncos between the 2012 and 2014 seasons. Additionally, the Dolphins were also one of the teams Peyton considered signing with following his release by the Colts in 2012. Later during the season, the team traded starting running back Jay Ajayi to the eventual champion Philadelphia Eagles in exchange for a 2018 fourth round draft pick on October 31.

The team's Week 1 game against the Buccaneers was rescheduled to November 19 due to Hurricane Irma. Week 11 was originally the two teams' bye week. Week 1 would become the bye week for both teams and they would not play until Week 2. This was first time since the Arizona Cardinals in 2001 in which a team had a bye week in Week 1.

The Dolphins struggled during the season and failed to improve on the previous season's record after losing to the Patriots on Week 12 and were eliminated from the postseason after losing to the Chiefs in Week 16. They finished with a reverse record from the previous year, going 6–10. This was the Dolphins's fourteenth season missing the playoffs since the league's realignment in 2002.

== Roster changes ==
=== Trades ===
Position	Dolphins Receive	Jaguars Receive	Source
TE	Julius Thomas	2017 7th Round Draft Pick	

Position	Dolphins Receive	Rams Receive	Source
DE	William Hayes & 2017 7th Round Draft Pick	2017 6th Round Draft Pick	

=== Free agents ===
==== Signings ====
Position	Player	Age	2016 Team	Contract
OLB	Lawrence Timmons	30	Pittsburgh Steelers	2 years, $12 million
G	Ted Larsen	29	Chicago Bears	3 years, $5.6 million
FS	Nate Allen	29	Oakland Raiders	1 year, $3.4 million
TE	Anthony Fasano	32	Tennessee Titans	1 year, $2.75 million
FS	T. J. McDonald	26	Los Angeles Rams	1 year, $1.3 million
QB	David Fales	26	Chicago Bears	1 year, $690K
QB	Jay Cutler	34	Chicago Bears	1 year, $10 million

==== Unrestricted ====
Position	Player	2017 Team	Notes
TE	Jordan Cameron	Retired	
DE	Andre Branch	Miami Dolphins	
G	Jermon Bushrod	Miami Dolphins	
LS	John Denney	Miami Dolphins	
LB	Spencer Paysinger	New York Jets	
QB	T. J. Yates	Buffalo Bills	
LB	Donald Butler	None	
CB	Chimdi Chekwa	None	
S	Bacarri Rambo	Buffalo Bills	
LB	Jelani Jenkins	Oakland Raiders	
TE	Dion Sims	Chicago Bears	
S	Reshad Jones	Miami Dolphins	

==== Restricted ====
Position	Player	2017 team	Notes
C	Anthony Steen	Miami Dolphins	
LB	Mike Hull	Miami Dolphins	
TE	Thomas Duarte	Miami Dolphins	
CB	Lafayette Pitts	Miami Dolphins	

==== Exclusive rights ====
Position	Player	2017 team	Notes
LB	Kiko Alonso	Miami Dolphins	
S	Michael Thomas	Miami Dolphins	
TE	Dominique Jones	None	
DE	Nick Williams	None	
RB	Damien Williams	Miami Dolphins	

=== Departures ===
Position	Player	Age	2017 Team
DT	Earl Mitchell	29	San Francisco 49ers
DE	Dion Jordan	27	Seattle Seahawks
OLB	Jelani Jenkins	25	Oakland Raiders
TE	Dion Sims	26	Chicago Bears
QB	T. J. Yates	28	Buffalo Bills
DE	Mario Williams	32	Retired
LB	Spencer Paysinger	28	New York Jets
LB	Donald Butler	28	Retired
S	Bacarri Rambo	26	Buffalo Bills
TE	Dominique Jones	29	Retired
TE	Jordan Cameron	28	Retired
FS	Isa Abdul-Quddus	28	Retired
CB	Byron Maxwell	29	Seattle Seahawks

== Draft ==
2017 Miami Dolphins Draft
Round	Selection	Player	Position	College
1	22	Charles Harris	DE	Missouri
2	54	Raekwon McMillan	OLB	Ohio State
3	97	Cordrea Tankersley	CB	Clemson
5	164	Isaac Asiata	G	Utah
5	178	Davon Godchaux	DT	LSU
6	194	Vincent Taylor	DT	Oklahoma State
7	237	Isaiah Ford	WR	Virginia Tech

Notes

- The team traded their third- and fourth-round selections as well as their sixth-round selection in 2016 (186th) to Minnesota in exchange for Minnesota's third-round selection in 2016 (86th). If Miami receives a fourth-round compensatory selection, that pick will go to Minnesota. If they do not receive a compensatory selection, Minnesota will receive Miami's original fourth-round selection.
- The Dolphins were awarded three compensatory picks by the NFL, one in the third round (97th) and two in the fifth (178th and 184th).

=== Undrafted free agents ===
Position	Player	College
S	Maurice Smith	Georgia
DE	Joby Saint Fleur	Northwestern Oklahoma State
LB	Praise Martin-Oguike	Temple
WR	Malcolm Lewis	Miami (FL)
RB	De'Veon Smith	Michigan
WR	Drew Morgan	Arkansas
LB	Chase Allen	Southern Illinois
WR	Francis Owusu	Stanford
CB	Larry Hope	Akron
T	Eric Smith	Virginia
DE	Cameron Malveaux	Houston
WR	Damore'ea Stringfellow	Ole Miss
P	Matt Haack	Arizona State

== Staff ==
2017 Miami Dolphins staff
Front office: Chairman/managing general partner – Stephen Ross; Vice chairman/partner – Bruce Beal; Vice chairman – Jorge Perez; Vice chairman – Don Shula; Vice chairman – Matt Higgins; President/CEO – Tom Garfinkel; General manager – Chris Grier; Executive vice president of football operations – Mike Tannenbaum; Senior director, football administration – Brandon Shore; Director, college scouting – Adam Engroff; Director, pro personnel – Anthony Hunt; Director of football research – Brian Fleury; Director of football research & strategy – Matt Sheldon; Director of analytics – Dennis Lock; Head coaches: Head coach – Adam Gase; Assistant head coach/linebackers – Frank Bush; Associate head coach/special teams coordinator – Darren Rizzi; Offensive coaches: Offensive coordinator – Clyde Christensen; Quarterbacks – Bo Hardegree; Running backs – Danny Barrett; Wide receivers – Shawn Jefferson; Assistant wide receivers – Ben Johnson; Tight ends – Shane Day; Offensive line – Dave DeGuglielmo; Assistant offensive line – Chris Kuper; Offensive quality control – Josh Grizzard	Defensive coaches: Defensive coordinator – Matt Burke; Defensive line – Terrell Williams; Assistant defensive line – Andre Carter; Assistant linebackers – Charlie Bullen; Defensive backs – Lou Anarumo; Assistant defensive backs – Daronte Jones; Defensive quality control – Rusty McKinney; Special teams coaches: Assistant special teams – Marwan Maalouf; Strength and conditioning: Head strength and conditioning – Dave Puloka; Assistant strength and conditioning – Jim Arthur

== Final roster ==
2017 Miami Dolphins roster
Quarterbacks (QB): 6 Jay Cutler; 9 David Fales; 8 Matt Moore; Running backs (RB): 32 Kenyan Drake; 34 Senorise Perry; 38 De'Veon Smith; 26 Damien Williams; Wide receivers (WR): 19 Jakeem Grant; 14 Jarvis Landry; 11 DeVante Parker; 87 Rashawn Scott; 10 Kenny Stills; Tight ends (TE): 85 A. J. Derby; 83 Thomas Duarte; 80 Anthony Fasano; 48 MarQueis Gray	Offensive linemen (OL): 68 Isaac Asiata G; 64 Jake Brendel C; 77 Jesse Davis G; 62 Ted Larsen G; 51 Mike Pouncey C; 72 Eric Smith T; 71 Zach Sterup T; 67 Laremy Tunsil T; 79 Sam Young T; Defensive linemen (DL): 50 Andre Branch DE; 78 Terrence Fede DE; 56 Davon Godchaux DT; 90 Charles Harris DE; 75 Cameron Malveaux DE; 97 Jordan Phillips DT; 93 Ndamukong Suh DT; 91 Cameron Wake DE; 98 Gabe Wright DT	Linebackers (LB): 59 Chase Allen OLB; 47 Kiko Alonso MLB; 44 Stephone Anthony OLB; 46 Neville Hewitt OLB; 45 Mike Hull MLB; 94 Lawrence Timmons OLB; Defensive backs (DB): 35 Walt Aikens SS; 43 Trae Elston FS; 25 Xavien Howard CB; 20 Reshad Jones SS; 21 Jordan Lucas SS; 28 Bobby McCain CB; 22 T. J. McDonald FS; 33 Torry McTyer CB; 30 Cordrea Tankersley CB; 42 Alterraun Verner CB; Special teams (ST): 92 John Denney LS; 16 Matt Haack P; 1 Cody Parkey K	Practice squad: 40 Taveze Calhoun CB; 7 Brandon Doughty QB; 63 Sean Hickey T; 41 Tracy Howard FS; 18 Malcolm Lewis WR; 81 Drew Morgan WR; 37 Brandon Radcliff RB; 76 Jonathan Woodard DE; Reserve: 29 Nate Allen FS (IR); 49 Lamin Barrow MLB (IR); 74 Jermon Bushrod G (IR); 88 Leonte Carroo WR (NF-Inj.); 15 Isaiah Ford WR (IR); 95 William Hayes DE (IR); 70 Ja'Wuan James T (IR); 36 Tony Lippett CB (IR); 52 Raekwon McMillan OLB (IR); 55 Koa Misi OLB (IR); 27 Maurice Smith FS (NF-Inj.); 65 Anthony Steen G (IR); 17 Ryan Tannehill QB (IR); 96 Vincent Taylor DT (IR); 89 Julius Thomas TE (IR); 31 Michael Thomas FS (IR); Rookies in italics 53 active, 16 reserve, 8 practice squad

== Preseason ==
Week	Date	Opponent	Result	Record	Venue	Recap
1	August 10	Atlanta Falcons	W 23–20	1–0	Hard Rock Stadium	Recap
2	August 17	Baltimore Ravens	L 7–31	1–1	Hard Rock Stadium	Recap
3	August 24	at Philadelphia Eagles	L 31–38	1–2	Lincoln Financial Field	Recap
4	August 31	at Minnesota Vikings	W 30–9	2–2	U.S. Bank Stadium	Recap

== Regular season ==
=== Schedule ===
On December 13, 2016, the NFL announced that the Dolphins would play host to the New Orleans Saints as one of the NFL London Games at Wembley Stadium. The game occurred during Week 4 (Sunday, October 1), and was televised in the United States.

The remainder of the Dolphins' 2017 schedule was finalized and announced on April 20.

Week	Date	Opponent	Result	Record	Venue	Recap
1	Bye (Note: The Dolphins were originally scheduled to host the Tampa Bay Buccaneers during Week 1 (September 10) at Hard Rock Stadium. However, due to the impact from Hurricane Irma, the game was rescheduled to Week 11, in which both the Buccaneers and Dolphins would originally have had their byes.)					
2	September 17	at Los Angeles Chargers	**W** 19–17	1–0	StubHub Center	Recap
3	September 24	at **New York Jets**	**L** 6–20	1–1	MetLife Stadium	Recap
4	October 1	New Orleans Saints	**L** 0–20	1–2	(United Kingdom) Wembley Stadium (London)	Recap
5	October 8	Tennessee Titans	**W** 16–10	2–2	Hard Rock Stadium	Recap
6	October 15	at Atlanta Falcons	**W** 20–17	3–2	Mercedes-Benz Stadium	Recap
7	October 22	**New York Jets**	**W** 31–28	4–2	Hard Rock Stadium	Recap
8	October 26	at Baltimore Ravens	**L** 0–40	4–3	M&T Bank Stadium	Recap
9	November 5	Oakland Raiders	**L** 24–27	4–4	Hard Rock Stadium	Recap
10	November 13	at Carolina Panthers	**L** 21–45	4–5	Bank of America Stadium	Recap
11	November 19	Tampa Bay Buccaneers	**L** 20–30	4–6	Hard Rock Stadium	Recap
12	November 26	at **New England Patriots**	**L** 17–35	4–7	Gillette Stadium	Recap
13	December 3	Denver Broncos	**W** 35–9	5–7	Hard Rock Stadium	Recap
14	December 11	**New England Patriots**	**W** 27–20	6–7	Hard Rock Stadium	Recap
15	December 17	at **Buffalo Bills**	**L** 16–24	6–8	New Era Field	Recap
16	December 24	at Kansas City Chiefs	**L** 13–29	6–9	Arrowhead Stadium	Recap
17	December 31	**Buffalo Bills**	**L** 16–22	6–10	Hard Rock Stadium	Recap

Note: Intra-division opponents are in bold text.

=== Game summaries ===
==== Week 2: at Los Angeles Chargers ====
Week Two: Miami Dolphins at Los Angeles Chargers – Game summary

Quarter	1	2	3	4	Total
**Dolphins**	3	0	10	6	**19**
Chargers	0	10	7	0	**17**

at StubHub Center, Carson, California

- Date: September 17
- Game time: 4:05 p.m. EDT/1:05 p.m. PDT
- Game weather: 71 °F (22 °C), cloudy
- Game attendance: 25,381
- Referee: Tony Corrente
- TV announcers (CBS): Greg Gumbel, Trent Green and Jamie Erdahl
- Recap, Gamebook

Game information

**First quarter**

- MIA – Cody Parkey 30-yard field goal, 7:13. Dolphins 3–0. **Drive: 13 plays, 70 yards, 6:18.**

**Second quarter**

- LAC – Younghoe Koo 41-yard field goal, 13:46. Tied 3–3. **Drive: 6 plays, 23 yards, 2:36.**
- LAC – Melvin Gordon 1-yard run (Younghoe Koo kick), 5:05. Chargers 10–3. **Drive: 7 plays, 70 yards, 3:57.**

**Third quarter**

- MIA – Kenny Stills 29-yard pass from Jay Cutler (Cody Parkey kick), 12:15. Tied 10–10. **Drive: 7 plays, 75 yards, 2:53.**
- LAC – Antonio Gates 7-yard pass from Philip Rivers (Younghoe Koo kick), 8:24. Chargers 17–10. **Drive: 8 plays, 77 yards, 3:49.**
- MIA – Cody Parkey 28-yard field goal, 2:48. Chargers 17–13. **Drive: 12 plays, 67 yards, 5:35.**

**Fourth quarter**

- MIA – Cody Parkey 35-yard field goal, 6:32. Chargers 17–16. **Drive: 14 plays, 64 yards, 7:05.**
- MIA – Cody Parkey 54-yard field goal, 1:10. Dolphins 19–17. **Drive: 5 plays, 15 yards, 1:57.**

**Top passers**

- MIA – Jay Cutler – 24/33, 230 yards, TD
- LAC – Philip Rivers – 31/39, 331 yards, TD

**Top rushers**

- MIA – Jay Ajayi – 28 rushes, 122 yards
- LAC – Branden Oliver – 3 rushes, 31 yards

**Top receivers**

- MIA – Jarvis Landry – 13 receptions, 78 yards
- LAC – Keenan Allen – 9 receptions, 100 yards

After their week 1 game was postponed due to Hurricane Irma, the Dolphins traveled out to LA to face the new Los Angeles Chargers, where they won 19–17 to start the season at 1–0. It was also the Dolphins' first road win over the Chargers since 2005.

==== Week 3: at New York Jets ====
Week Three: Miami Dolphins at New York Jets – Game summary

Quarter	1	2	3	4	Total
Dolphins	0	0	0	6	**6**
**Jets**	0	10	10	0	**20**

at MetLife Stadium, East Rutherford, New Jersey

- Date: September 24
- Game time: 1:00 p.m. EDT
- Game weather: 88 °F (31 °C), sunny
- Game attendance: 77,562
- Referee: Terry McAulay
- TV announcers (CBS): Tom McCarthy, Steve Tasker and Steve Beuerlein
- Recap, Gamebook

Game information

**First quarter**

- No scoring plays.

**Second quarter**

- NYJ – Chandler Catanzaro 40-yard field goal, 7:21. Jets 3–0. **Drive: 9 plays, 41 yards, 5:42.**
- NYJ – Robby Anderson 69-yard pass from Josh McCown (Chandler Catanzaro kick), 1:51. Jets 10–0. **Drive: 3 plays, 71 yards, 0:40.**

**Third quarter**

- NYJ – Bilal Powell 1-yard run (Chandler Catanzaro kick), 9:52. Jets 17–0. **Drive: 7 plays, 49 yards, 4:06.**
- NYJ – Chandler Catanzaro 22-yard field goal, 1:38. Jets 20–0. **Drive: 13 plays, 45 yards, 6:58.**

**Fourth quarter**

- MIA – DeVante Parker 3-yard pass from Jay Cutler (kick failed), 0:06. Jets 20–6. **Drive: 8 plays, 80 yards, 2:15.**

**Top passers**

- MIA – Jay Cutler – 26/44, 220 yards, TD, INT
- NYJ – Josh McCown – 18/23, 249 yards, TD

**Top rushers**

- MIA – Jay Ajayi – 11 rushes, 16 yards
- NYJ – Bilal Powell – 15 rushes, 37 yards, TD

**Top receivers**

- MIA – DeVante Parker – 8 receptions, 76 yards, TD
- NYJ – Robby Anderson – 3 receptions, 95 yards, TD

==== Week 4: vs. New Orleans Saints ====
NFL London Games

Week Four: New Orleans Saints at Miami Dolphins – Game summary

Quarter	1	2	3	4	Total
**Saints**	0	3	7	10	**20**
Dolphins	0	0	0	0	**0**

at Wembley Stadium, London, England

- Date: October 1
- Game time: 2:30 p.m. BST/9:30 a.m. EDT
- Game weather: 63 °F (17 °C), clear
- Game attendance: 84,423
- Referee: Ed Hochuli
- TV announcers (Fox): Kevin Burkhardt, Charles Davis and Pam Oliver
- Recap, Gamebook

Game information

**First quarter**

- No scoring plays

**Second quarter**

- NO – Wil Lutz 43-yard field goal, 0:00. Saints 3–0. **Drive: 8 plays, 25 yards, 1:10.**

**Third quarter**

- NO – Michael Thomas 3-yard pass from Drew Brees (Wil Lutz kick), 9:01. Saints 10–0. **Drive: 11 plays, 77 yards, 5:59.**

**Fourth quarter**

- NO – Wil Lutz 45-yard field goal, 12:32. Saints 13–0. **Drive: 12 plays, 34 yards, 6:37.**
- NO – Alvin Kamara 12-yard pass from Drew Brees (Wil Lutz kick), 3:57. Saints 20–0. **Drive: 11 plays, 87 yards, 5:41.**

**Top passers**

- NO – Drew Brees – 29/41, 268 yards, 2 TD
- MIA – Jay Cutler – 20/28, 164 yards, INT

**Top rushers**

- NO – Mark Ingram II – 14 carries, 45 yards
- MIA – Jay Ajayi – 12 carries, 46 yards

**Top receivers**

- NO – Michael Thomas – 8 receptions, 89 yards, TD
- MIA – DeVante Parker – 6 receptions, 69 yards

==== Week 5: vs. Tennessee Titans ====
Week Five: Tennessee Titans at Miami Dolphins – Game summary

Quarter	1	2	3	4	Total
Titans	0	3	7	0	**10**
**Dolphins**	10	0	0	6	**16**

at Hard Rock Stadium, Miami Gardens, Florida

- Date: October 8
- Game time: 1:00 p.m. EDT
- Game weather: 89 °F (32 °C), partly cloudy
- Game attendance: 65,135
- Referee: Bill Vinovich
- TV announcers (CBS): Andrew Catalon and James Lofton
- Recap, Gamebook

Game information

**First quarter**

- MIA – Cody Parkey 41-yard field goal, 0:43. Dolphins 3–0. **Drive: 7 plays, 19 yards, 3:09.**
- MIA – Reshad Jones 38-yard fumble return (Cody Parkey kick), 0:06. Dolphins 10–0.

**Second quarter**

- TEN – Ryan Succop 45-yard field goal, 9:37. Dolphins 10–3. **Drive: 4 plays, 13 yards, 2:15.**

**Third quarter**

- TEN – Phillip Supernaw 11-yard pass from Matt Cassel (Ryan Succop kick), 7:17. Tied 10–10. **Drive: 9 plays, 69 yards, 4:42.**

**Fourth quarter**

- MIA – Jarvis Landry 6-yard pass from Jay Cutler (kick failed), 10:33. Dolphins 16–10. **Drive: 10 plays, 58 yards, 4:56.**

**Top passers**

- TEN – Matt Cassel – 21/32, 141 yards, TD
- MIA – Jay Cutler – 12/26, 92 yards, TD, INT

**Top rushers**

- TEN – DeMarco Murray – 14 carries, 58 yards
- MIA – Jay Ajayi – 25 carries, 77 yards

**Top receivers**

- TEN – Jonnu Smith – 5 receptions, 21 yards
- MIA – Jarvis Landry – 5 receptions, 44 yards, TD

Due to the delayed game of week one, this ended up being the first home game for the Dolphins in the regular season.

==== Week 6: at Atlanta Falcons ====
Week Six: Miami Dolphins at Atlanta Falcons – Game summary

Quarter	1	2	3	4	Total
**Dolphins**	0	0	14	6	**20**
Falcons	10	7	0	0	**17**

at Mercedes-Benz Stadium, Atlanta

- Date: October 15
- Game time: 1:00 p.m. EDT
- Game weather: Played indoors (retractable roof closed)
- Game attendance: 70,593
- Referee: John Hussey
- TV announcers (CBS): Greg Gumbel, Trent Green and Jamie Erdahl
- Recap, Gamebook

Game information

**First quarter**

- ATL – Matt Bryant 50-yard field goal, 9:41. Falcons 3–0. **Drive: 11 plays, 43 yards, 5:19.**
- ATL – Marvin Hall 40-yard pass from Matt Ryan (Matt Bryant kick), 1:51. Falcons 10–0. **Drive: 9 plays, 90 yards, 4:49.**

**Second quarter**

- ATL – Tevin Coleman 6-yard run (Matt Bryant kick), 5:29. Falcons 17–0. **Drive: 5 plays, 61 yards, 2:23**

**Third quarter**

- MIA – Kenny Stills 11-yard pass from Jay Cutler (Cody Parkey kick), 6:17. Falcons 17–7. **Drive: 15 plays, 75 yards, 8:43.**
- MIA – Jarvis Landry 7-yard pass from Jay Cutler (Cody Parkey kick), 1:32. Falcons 17–14. **Drive: 5 plays, 51 yards, 2:30.**

**Fourth quarter**

- MIA – Cody Parkey 49-yard field goal, 8:43. Tied 17–17. **Drive: 8 plays, 21 yards, 3:08.**
- MIA – Cody Parkey 38-yard field goal, 2:30. Dolphins 20–17. **Drive: 10 plays, 46 yards, 4:30.**

**Top passers**

- MIA – Jay Cutler – 19/33, 151 yards, 2 TD, INT
- ATL – Matt Ryan – 24/35, 248 yards, TD, INT

**Top rushers**

- MIA – Jay Ajayi – 26 carries, 130 yards
- ATL – Devonta Freeman – 9 carries, 68 yards

**Top receivers**

- MIA – Jarvis Landry – 8 receptions, 62 yards, TD
- ATL – Austin Hooper – 7 receptions, 48 yards

This was the Dolphins' first win in Atlanta since 1980, during the Don Shula era.

==== Week 7: vs. New York Jets ====
Week Seven: New York Jets at Miami Dolphins – Game summary

Quarter	1	2	3	4	Total
Jets	14	7	7	0	**28**
**Dolphins**	7	7	0	17	**31**

at Hard Rock Stadium, Miami Gardens, Florida

- Date: October 22
- Game time: 1:00 p.m. EDT
- Game weather: 86 °F (30 °C), partly cloudy
- Game attendance: 65,025
- Referee: Walt Coleman
- TV announcers (Fox): Dan Hellie, Chris Spielman and Peter Schrager
- Recap, Gamebook

Game information

**First quarter**

- NYJ – Jermaine Kearse 29-yard pass from Josh McCown (Chandler Catanzaro kick), 12:55. Jets 7–0. **Drive: 5 plays, 75 yards, 2:05.**
- MIA – Jarvis Landry 4-yard pass from Jay Cutler (Cody Parkey kick), 10:44. Tied 7–7. **Drive: 5 plays, 75 yards, 2:11.**
- NYJ – Robby Anderson 18-yard pass from Josh McCown (Chandler Catanzaro kick), 1:27. Jets 14–7. **Drive: 8 plays, 75 yards, 4:54.**

**Second quarter**

- MIA – Anthony Fasano 4-yard pass from Jay Cutler (Cody Parkey kick), 6:14. Tied 14–14. **Drive: 10 plays, 70 yards, 5:11.**
- NYJ – Josh McCown 1-yard run (Chandler Catanzaro kick), 1:51. Jets 21–14. **Drive: 2 plays, 1 yards, 0:41.**

**Third quarter**

- NYJ – Austin Seferian-Jenkins 10-yard pass from Josh McCown (Chandler Catanzaro kick), 1:41. Jets 28–14. **Drive: 7 plays, 45 yards, 4:04.**

**Fourth quarter**

- MIA – Kenny Stills 28-yard pass from Matt Moore (Cody Parkey kick), 11:21. Jets 28–21. **Drive: 4 plays, 42 yards, 1:27.**
- MIA – Kenny Stills 2-yard pass from Matt Moore (Cody Parkey kick), 6:19. Tied 28–28. **Drive: 6 plays, 54 yards, 3:25.**
- MIA – Cody Parkey 39-yard field goal, 0:22. Dolphins 31–28. **Drive: 4 plays, 6 yards, 0:17.**

**Top passers**

- NYJ – Josh McCown – 17/27, 209 yards, 3 TD, INT
- MIA – Matt Moore – 13/21, 188 yards, 2 TD, INT

**Top rushers**

- NYJ – Bilal Powell – 9 carries, 43 yards
- MIA – Jay Ajayi – 23 carries, 51 yards

**Top receivers**

- NYJ – Matt Forte – 5 receptions, 41 yards
- MIA – Jarvis Landry – 7 receptions, 93 yards, TD

==== Week 8: at Baltimore Ravens ====
Week Eight: Miami Dolphins at Baltimore Ravens – Game summary

Quarter	1	2	3	4	Total
Dolphins	0	0	0	0	**0**
**Ravens**	7	13	0	20	**40**

at M&T Bank Stadium, Baltimore, Maryland

- Date: October 26
- Game time: 8:25 p.m. EDT
- Game weather: 56 °F (13 °C), partly cloudy
- Game attendance: 70,408
- Referee: John Parry
- TV announcers (CBS/NFLN/Amazon Video): Jim Nantz, Tony Romo, Tracy Wolfson and Jay Feely
- Recap, Gamebook

Game information

**First quarter**

- BAL – Jeremy Maclin 34 yard pass From Joe Flacco (Justin Tucker kick good), 8:25. Ravens 7–0. **Drive: 3 plays, 40 yards, 0:50.**

**Second quarter**

- BAL – Justin Tucker 55 yard field goal, 13:21. Ravens 10–0. **Drive: 7 plays, 35 yards, 2:51.**
- BAL – Justin Tucker 48 yard field goal, 8:07. Ravens 13–0. **Drive: 8 plays, 30 yards, 3:48.**
- BAL – Benjamin Watson 2 yard pass from Ryan Mallett (Justin Tucker kick good), 8:56. Ravens 20–0. **Drive: 8 plays, 60 yards, 3:04.**

**Third quarter**

- No scoring plays

**Fourth quarter**

- BAL – C. J. Mosley 63 yard interception return (pass failed), 14:29. Ravens 26–0.
- BAL – Chris Moore fumble recovery in end zone (Justin Tucker kick good), 6:39. Ravens 33–0. **Drive:8 plays, 38 yards, 4:44.**
- BAL – Jimmy Smith 50 yard interception return (Justin Tucker kick good), 4:28. Ravens 40–0.

**Top passers**

- MIA – Matt Moore – 25/44, 176 yards, 2 INT
- BAL – Joe Flacco – 10/15, 101 yards, TD

**Top rushers**

- MIA – Jay Ajayi – 13 rushes, 23 yards
- BAL – Alex Collins – 18 rushes, 113 yards

**Top receivers**

- MIA – Kenny Stills – 5 receptions, 65 yards
- BAL – Jeremy Maclin – 3 receptions, 53 yards, TD

==== Week 9: vs. Oakland Raiders ====
Week Nine: Oakland Raiders at Miami Dolphins – Game summary

Quarter	1	2	3	4	Total
**Raiders**	3	10	7	7	**27**
Dolphins	0	9	7	8	**24**

at Hard Rock Stadium, Miami Gardens, Florida

- Date: November 5
- Game time: 8:30 p.m. EST
- Game weather: 77 °F (25 °C)
- Game attendance: 65,139
- Referee: Terry McAulay
- TV announcers (NBC): Al Michaels, Cris Collinsworth and Michele Tafoya
- Recap, Gamebook

Game information

**First quarter**

- OAK – Giorgio Tavecchio 36-yard field goal, 7:31. Raiders 3–0. **Drive: 12 plays, 58 yards, 7:29.**

**Second quarter**

- MIA – Damien Williams 10-yard pass from Jay Cutler (kick failed), 10:37. Dolphins 6–3. **Drive: 10 plays, 82 yards, 5:35.**
- OAK – Johnny Holton 44- yard pass from Derek Carr (Giorgio Tavecchio kick), 3:26. Raiders 10–6. **Drive: 6 plays, 81 yards, 4:02.**
- MIA – Cody Parkey 49-yard field goal, 0:32. Raiders 10–9. **Drive: 8 plays, 49 yards, 2:54.**
- OAK – Giorgio Tavecchio 53-yard field goal, 0:00. Raiders 13–9. **Drive: 5 plays, 42 yards, 0:32.**

**Third quarter**

- OAK – Marshawn Lynch 22-yard run (Giorgio Tavecchio kick), 9:23. Raiders 20–9. **Drive: 6 plays, 67 yards, 3:24.**
- MIA – Jarvis Landry 6-yard pass from Jay Cutler (Cody Parkey kick), 6:34. Raiders 20–16. **Drive: 7 plays, 75 yards, 2:49.**

**Fourth quarter**

- OAK – Marshawn Lynch 3-yard run (Giorgio Tavecchio kick), 4:37. Raiders 27–16. **Drive:6 plays, 87 yards, 2:44.**
- MIA – Julius Thomas 15-yard pass from Jay Cutler (Kenyan Drake run), 1:32. Raiders 27–24. **Drive: 5 plays, 83 yards, 0:22.**

**Top passers**

- OAK – Derek Carr 21/30, 300 yards, 1 TD, 1 INT
- MIA – Jay Cutler 34/42, 311 yards, 3 TD

**Top rushers**

- OAK – Marshawn Lynch 14 rushes, 57 yards, 2 TD
- MIA – Kenyan Drake 9 rushes, 69 yards

**Top receivers**

- OAK – Jared Cook 8 receptions, 126 yards
- MIA – Julius Thomas 6 receptions, 84 yards, 1 TD

==== Week 10: at Carolina Panthers ====
Week Ten: Miami Dolphins at Carolina Panthers – Game summary

Quarter	1	2	3	4	Total
Dolphins	0	7	7	7	**21**
**Panthers**	3	14	21	7	**45**

at Bank of America Stadium, Charlotte, North Carolina

- Date: November 13
- Game time: 8:30 p.m. EST
- Game weather: 49 °F (9 °C), clear
- Game attendance: 72,790
- Referee: Gene Steratore
- TV announcers (ESPN): Sean McDonough, Jon Gruden and Lisa Salters
- Recap, Gamebook

Game information

**First quarter**

- CAR – Graham Gano 40-yard field goal, 1:50. Panthers 3–0. **Drive: 11 plays, 42 yards, 5:33.**

**Second quarter**

- CAR – Christian McCaffrey 4-yard run (Graham Gano kick), 6:59. Panthers 10–0. **Drive: 12 plays, 85 yards, 6:17.**
- MIA – Julius Thomas 2-yard pass from Jay Cutler (Cody Parkey kick), 2:12. Panthers 10–7. **Drive: 10 plays, 75 yards, 4:47.**
- CAR – Ed Dickson 7-yard pass from Cam Newton (Graham Gano kick), 0:19. Panthers 17–7. **Drive: 4 plays, 20 yards, 0:22.**

**Third quarter**

- CAR – Devin Funchess 28-yard pass from Cam Newton (Graham Gano kick), 11:50. Panthers 24–7. **Drive: 8 plays, 78 yards, 3:10.**
- CAR – Cameron Artis-Payne 12-yard run (Graham Gano kick), 7:15. Panthers 31–7. **Drive: 4 plays, 48 yards, 2:19.**
- MIA – Kenyan Drake 66-yard run (Cody Parkey kick), 5:47. Panthers 31–14. **Drive: 3 plays, 75 yards, 1:28.**
- CAR – Christian McCaffrey 2-yard pass from Cam Newton (Graham Gano kick), 3:07. Panthers 38–14. **Drive: 4 plays, 87 yards, 2:40.**

**Fourth quarter**

- CAR – Devin Funchess 32-yard pass from Cam Newton (Graham Gano kick), 8:20. Panthers 45–14. **Drive: 11 plays, 83 yards, 6:43.**
- MIA – Jarvis Landry 9-yard pass from Jay Cutler (Cody Parkey kick), 4:05. Panthers 45–21. **Drive: 10 plays, 75 yards, 4:15.**

**Top passers**

- MIA – Jay Cutler – 22/37, 213 yards, 2 TD, INT
- CAR – Cam Newton – 21/35, 254 yards, 4 TD

**Top rushers**

- MIA – Kenyan Drake – 7 carries, 82 yards, TD
- CAR – Jonathan Stewart – 17 carries, 110 yards

**Top receivers**

- MIA – DeVante Parker – 6 receptions, 66 yards
- CAR – Devin Funchess – 5 receptions, 92 yards, 2 TD

==== Week 11: vs. Tampa Bay Buccaneers ====
Week Eleven: Tampa Bay Buccaneers at Miami Dolphins – Game summary

Quarter	1	2	3	4	Total
**Buccaneers**	3	17	0	10	**30**
Dolphins	7	0	6	7	**20**

at Hard Rock Stadium, Miami Gardens, Florida

- Date: November 19
- Game time: 1:00 p.m. EST
- Game weather: 81 °F (27 °C), sunny
- Game attendance: 65,089
- Referee: Tony Corrente
- TV announcers (Fox): Dick Stockton, Mark Schlereth and Shannon Spake
- Recap, Gamebook

Game information

**First quarter**

- TB – Patrick Murray 30-yard field goal, 7:13. Buccaneers 3–0. **Drive: 7 plays, 63 yards, 3:28.**
- MIA – Jarvis Landry 2-yard pass from Jay Cutler (Cody Parkey kick), 4:23. Dolphins 7–3. **Drive: 7 plays, 90 yards, 2:50.**

**Second quarter**

- TB – Patrick Murray 30-yard field goal, 14:10. Dolphins 7–6. **Drive: 11 plays, 59 yards, 5:13.**
- TB – O. J. Howard 6-yard pass from Ryan Fitzpatrick (Patrick Murray kick), 12:14. Buccaneers 13–7. **Drive: 3 plays, 5 yards, 0:41.**
- TB – DeSean Jackson 4-yard pass from Ryan Fitzpatrick (Patrick Murray kick), 0:45. Buccaneers 20–7. **Drive: 4 plays, 37 yards, 1:05.**

**Third quarter**

- MIA – Cody Parkey 26-yard field goal, 10:57. Buccaneers 20–10. **Drive: 9 plays, 70 yards, 4:03.**
- MIA – Cody Parkey 31-yard field goal, 4:19. Buccaneers 20–13. **Drive: 11 plays, 66 yards, 4:52.**

**Fourth quarter**

- MIA – Kenny Stills 61-yard pass from Matt Moore (Cody Parkey kick), 3:00. Tied 20–20. **Drive: 5 plays, 74 yards, 1:37.**
- TB – Patrick Murray 35-yard field goal, 0:04. Buccaneers 23–20. **Drive: 9 plays, 58 yards, 2:56.**
- TB – Adarius Glanton fumble recovery in end zone (Patrick Murray kick), 0:00. Buccaneers 30–20.

**Top passers**

- TB – Ryan Fitzpatrick – 22/37, 275 yards, 2 TD
- MIA – Matt Moore – 17/28, 282 yards, TD

**Top rushers**

- TB – Doug Martin – 19 carries, 38 yards
- MIA – Damien Williams – 10 carries, 78 yards

**Top receivers**

- TB – Mike Evans – 5 receptions, 92 yards
- MIA – Kenny Stills – 7 receptions, 180 yards, TD

In a game that was originally going to be played in week 1, but got moved due to Hurricane Irma, the Buccaneers won 30–20 thanks to three Jay Cutler interceptions

==== Week 12: at New England Patriots ====
Week Twelve: Miami Dolphins at New England Patriots – Game summary

Quarter	1	2	3	4	Total
Dolphins	0	10	0	7	**17**
**Patriots**	14	7	7	7	**35**

at Gillette Stadium, Foxborough, Massachusetts

- Date: November 26
- Game time: 1:00 p.m. EST
- Game weather: 47 °F (8 °C), partly cloudy
- Game attendance: 65,878
- Referee: Ronald Torbert
- TV announcers (CBS): Ian Eagle, Dan Fouts and Evan Washburn
- Recap, Gamebook

Game information

**First quarter**

- NE – Rex Burkhead 2-yard run (Stephen Gostkowski kick), 11:39. Patriots 7–0. **Drive: 8 plays, 75 yards, 3:21.**
- NE – Rob Gronkowski 5-yard pass from Tom Brady (Stephen Gostkowski kick), 5:33. Patriots 14–0. **Drive: 9 plays, 88 yards, 4:39.**

**Second quarter**

- MIA – Reshad Jones 14-yard fumble return (Cody Parkey kick), 13:19. Patriots 14–7.
- NE – Rex Burkhead 1-yard pass from Tom Brady (Stephen Gostkowski kick), 8:29. Patriots 21–7. **Drive: 9 plays, 78 yards, 4:50.**
- MIA – Cody Parkey 28-yard field goal, 4:06. Patriots 21–10. **Drive: 9 plays, 65 yards, 4:23.**

**Third quarter**

- NE – Rob Gronkowski 15-yard pass from Tom Brady (Stephen Gostkowski kick), 10:28. Patriots 28–10. **Drive: 7 plays, 77 yards, 2:46.**

**Fourth quarter**

- MIA – Kenyan Drake 5-yard pass from Matt Moore (Cody Parkey kick), 11:43. Patriots 28–17. **Drive: 8 plays, 73 yards, 3:12.**
- NE – Brandin Cooks 5-yard pass from Tom Brady (Stephen Gostkowski kick), 6:31. Patriots 35–17. **Drive: 5 plays, 38 yards, 2:10.**

**Top passers**

- MIA – Matt Moore – 23/34, 215 yards, TD, 2 INT
- NE – Tom Brady – 18/28, 227 yards, 4 TD, INT

**Top rushers**

- MIA – Damien Williams – 8 rushes, 38 yards
- NE – Dion Lewis – 15 rushes, 112 yards

**Top receivers**

- MIA – Jarvis Landry – 8 receptions, 70 yards
- NE – Brandin Cooks – 6 receptions, 83 yards, TD

==== Week 13: vs. Denver Broncos ====
Week Thirteen: Denver Broncos at Miami Dolphins – Game summary

Quarter	1	2	3	4	Total
Broncos	0	3	6	0	**9**
**Dolphins**	2	14	10	9	**35**

at Hard Rock Stadium, Miami Gardens, Florida

- Date: December 3
- Game time: 1:00 p.m. EST
- Game weather: 80 °F (27 °C), cloudy
- Game attendance: 65,092
- Referee: Carl Cheffers
- TV announcers (Fox): Dick Stockton, Mark Schlereth and Shannon Spake
- Recap, Gamebook

Game information

**First quarter**

- MIA – Matt Paradis fumble out of bounds in end zone, 3:07. Dolphins 2–0. **Drive: 3 plays, −5 yards, 1:21.**

**Second quarter**

- DEN – Brandon McManus 31-yard field goal, 13:28. Broncos 3–2. **Drive: 7 plays, 67 yards, 2:57.**
- MIA – Julius Thomas 9-yard pass from Jay Cutler (Cody Parkey kick), 9:39. Dolphins 9–3. **Drive: 9 plays, 75 yards, 3:49.**
- MIA – Xavien Howard 30-yard interception return (Cody Parkey kick), 9:32. Dolphins 16–3.

**Third quarter**

- MIA – Cody Parkey 37-yard field goal, 10:32. Dolphins 19–3. **Drive: 5 plays, 28 yards, 2:45.**
- DEN – Justin Simmons 65-yard interception return (pass failed), 4:56. Dolphins 19–9.
- MIA – Kenyan Drake 42-yard run (Cody Parkey kick), 2:54. Dolphins 26–9. **Drive: 4 plays, 61 yards, 2:02.**

**Fourth quarter**

- MIA – Kenny Stills 23-yard pass from Jay Cutler (Cody Parkey kick), 10:21. Dolphins 33–9. **Drive: 1 play, 23 yards, 0:06.**
- MIA – Isaiah McKenzie tackled in end zone by Senorise Perry for a safety, 8:49. Dolphins 35–9

**Top passers**

- DEN – Trevor Siemian – 19/41, 200 yards, 3 INT
- MIA – Jay Cutler – 18/31, 235 yards, 2 TD, 2 INT

**Top rushers**

- DEN – C. J. Anderson – 15 carries, 67 yards
- MIA – Kenyan Drake – 23 carries, 120 yards, TD

**Top receivers**

- DEN – C. J. Anderson – 4 receptions, 43 yards
- MIA – Kenny Stills – 5 receptions, 98 yards, TD

==== Week 14: vs. New England Patriots ====
Week Fourteen: New England Patriots at Miami Dolphins – Game summary

Quarter	1	2	3	4	Total
Patriots	0	10	0	10	**20**
**Dolphins**	6	7	14	0	**27**

at Hard Rock Stadium, Miami Gardens, Florida

- Date: December 11
- Game time: 8:30 p.m. EST
- Game weather: 55 °F (13 °C), clear
- Game attendance: 65,548
- Referee: Pete Morelli
- TV announcers (ESPN): Sean McDonough, Jon Gruden and Lisa Salters
- Recap, Gamebook

Game information

**First quarter**

- MIA – Cody Parkey 30-yard field goal, 9:01. Dolphins 3–0. **Drive: 13 plays, 69 yards, 5:59.**
- MIA – Cody Parkey 44-yard field goal, 3:49. Dolphins 6–0. **Drive: 8 plays, 34 yards, 4:26.**

**Second quarter**

- NE – Rex Burkhead 3-yard run (Stephen Gostkowski kick), 6:18. Patriots 7–6. **Drive: 5 plays, 51 yards, 2:56.**
- MIA – Jarvis Landry 5-yard pass from Jay Cutler (Cody Parkey kick), 3:33. Dolphins 13–7. **Drive: 7 plays, 80 yards, 2:45.**
- NE – Stephen Gostkowski 46-yard field goal, 0:02. Dolphins 13–10. **Drive: 8 plays, 47 yards, 3:31.**

**Third quarter**

- MIA – Jakeem Grant 25-yard pass from Jay Cutler (Cody Parkey kick), 11:03. Dolphins 20–10. **Drive: 5 plays, 46 yards, 2:21.**
- MIA – Jarvis Landry 4-yard pass from Jay Cutler (Cody Parkey kick), 4:43. Dolphins 27–10. **Drive: 8 plays, 82 yards, 4:21.**

**Fourth quarter**

- NE – James White 3-yard pass from Tom Brady (Stephen Gostkowski kick), 13:05. Dolphins 27–17. **Drive: 6 plays, 53 yards, 2:29.**
- NE – Stephen Gostkowski 33-yard field goal, 0:53. Dolphins 27–20. **Drive: 6 plays, 62 yards, 1:31.**

**Top passers**

- NE – Tom Brady – 24/43, 233 yards, TD, 2 INT
- MIA – Jay Cutler – 25/38, 263 yards, 3 TD

**Top rushers**

- NE – Dion Lewis – 5 carries, 17 yards
- MIA – Kenyan Drake – 25 carries, 114 yards

**Top receivers**

- NE – Danny Amendola – 6 receptions, 76 yards
- MIA – Jarvis Landry – 8 receptions, 46 yards, 2 TD

==== Week 15: at Buffalo Bills ====
Week Fifteen: Miami Dolphins at Buffalo Bills – Game summary

Quarter	1	2	3	4	Total
Dolphins	3	3	0	10	**16**
**Bills**	7	14	3	0	**24**

at New Era Field, Orchard Park, New York

- Date: December 17
- Game time: 1:00 p.m. EST
- Game weather: 22 °F (−6 °C), mostly cloudy
- Game attendance: 62,202
- Referee: Jerome Boger
- TV announcers (CBS): Beth Mowins and Jay Feely
- Recap, Gamebook

Game information

**First quarter**

- BUF – LeSean McCoy 4-yard run (Stephen Hauschka kick), 10:12. Bills 7–0. **Drive: 10 plays, 81 yards, 4:48.**
- MIA – Cody Parkey 28-yard field goal, 3:16. Bills 7–3. **Drive: 7 plays, 50 yards, 3:51.**

**Second quarter**

- MIA – Cody Parkey 41-yard field goal, 9:15. Bills 7–6. **Drive: 14 plays, 71 yards, 7:04.**
- BUF – LeSean McCoy 16-yard pass from Tyrod Taylor (Stephen Hauschka kick), 6:05. Bills 14–6. **Drive: 8 plays, 75 yards, 3:10.**
- BUF – Tyrod Taylor 9-yard run (Stephen Hauschka kick), 0:33. Bills 21–6. **Drive: 8 plays, 80 yards, 1:50.**

**Third quarter**

- BUF – Stephen Hasuschka 34-yard field goal, 5:40. Bills 24–6. **Drive: 5 plays, 7 yards, 2:06.**

**Fourth quarter**

- MIA – Kenyan Drake 1-yard run (Cody Parkey kick), 7:57. Bills 24–13. **Drive: 6 plays, 13 yards, 1:35.**
- MIA – Cody Parkey 26-yard field goal, 0:39. Bills 24–16. **Drive: 17 plays, 78 yards, 3:54.**

**Top passers**

- MIA – Jay Cutler – 28/49, 274 yards, 3 INT
- BUF – Tyrod Taylor – 17/29, 224 yards, TD

**Top rushers**

- MIA – Kenyan Drake – 16 carries, 78 yards, TD
- BUF – LeSean McCoy – 20 carries, 50 yards, TD

**Top receivers**

- MIA – Jarvis Landry – 10 receptions, 99 yards
- BUF – Charles Clay – 5 receptions, 68 yards

==== Week 16: at Kansas City Chiefs ====
Week Sixteen: Miami Dolphins at Kansas City Chiefs – Game summary

Quarter	1	2	3	4	Total
Dolphins	3	10	0	0	**13**
**Chiefs**	3	17	3	6	**29**

at Arrowhead Stadium, Kansas City, Missouri

- Date: December 24
- Game time: 1:00 p.m. EST/12:00 p.m. CST
- Game weather: 23 °F (−5 °C), cloudy
- Game attendance: 65,325
- Referee: Brad Allen
- TV announcers (CBS): Kevin Harlan, Rich Gannon and Jenny Dell
- Recap, Gamebook

Game information

**First quarter**

- KC – Harrison Butker 31-yard field goal, 9:41. Chiefs 3–0. **Drive: 7 plays, 42 yards, 3:23.**
- MIA – Cody Parkey 44-yard field goal, 3:29. Tied 3–3. **Drive: 12 plays, 49 yards, 6:12.**

**Second quarter**

- KC – Travis Kelce 9-yard pass from Alex Smith (Harrison Butker kick), 13:00. Chiefs 10–3. **Drive: 9 plays, 75 yards, 5:29.**
- MIA – Cody Parkey 28-yard field goal, 8:11. Chiefs 10–6. **Drive: 9 plays, 65 yards, 4:49.**
- KC – Kareem Hunt 1-yard run (Harrison Butker kick), 3:37. Chiefs 17–6. **Drive: 9 plays, 68 yards, 4:34.**
- MIA – Jakeem Grant 65-yard pass from Jay Cutler (Cody Parkey kick), 3:22. Chiefs 17–13. **Drive: 1 plays, 65 yards, 0:15.**
- KC – Harrison Butker 32-yard field goal, 0:07. Chiefs 20–13. **Drive: 8 plays, 41 yards, 0:42.**

**Third quarter**

- KC – Harrison Butker 21-yard field goal, 10:24. Chiefs 23–13. **Drive: 8 plays, 61 yards, 4:36.**

**Fourth quarter**

- KC – Harrison Butker 29-yard field goal, 12:16. Chiefs 26–13. **Drive: 11 plays, 43 yards, 4:47.**
- KC – Harrison Butker 49-yard field goal, 3:41. Chiefs 29–13. **Drive: 10 plays, 31 yards, 6:18.**

**Top passers**

- MIA – Jay Cutler – 19/38, 286 yards, TD
- KC – Alex Smith – 25/39, 304 yards, TD

**Top rushers**

- MIA – Kenyan Drake – 13 carries, 57 yards
- KC – Kareem Hunt – 29 carries, 91 yards, TD

**Top receivers**

- MIA – Jakeem Grant – 4 receptions, 107 yards, TD
- KC – Tyreek Hill – 6 receptions, 109 yards

==== Week 17: vs. Buffalo Bills ====
Week Seventeen: Buffalo Bills at Miami Dolphins – Game summary

Quarter	1	2	3	4	Total
**Bills**	7	3	9	3	**22**
Dolphins	0	0	3	13	**16**

at Hard Rock Stadium, Miami Gardens, Florida

- Date: December 31
- Game time: 4:25 p.m. EST
- Game weather: 71 °F (22 °C), clear
- Game attendance: 65,571
- Referee: Jeff Triplette
- TV announcers (CBS): Andrew Catalon and James Lofton
- Recap, Gamebook

Game information

**First quarter**

- BUF – Nick O'Leary 26-yard pass from Tyrod Taylor (Stephen Hauschka kick), 10:14. Bills 7–0. **Drive: 7 plays, 72 yards, 3:12.**

**Second quarter**

- BUF – Stephen Hauschka 23-yard field goal, 14:46. Bills 10–0. **Drive: 11 plays, 80 yards, 4:52.**

**Third quarter**

- BUF – Stephen Hauschka 49-yard field goal, 10:17. Bills 13–0. **Drive: 9 plays, 42 yards, 4:43.**
- BUF – Kyle Williams 1-yard run (run failed), 7:08. Bills 19–0. **Drive: 5 plays, 50 yards, 1:35.**
- MIA – Cody Parkey 36-yard field goal, 2:30. Bills 19–3. **Drive: 11 plays, 57 yards, 4:38.**

**Fourth quarter**

- BUF – Stephen Hauschka 33-yard field goal, 11:41. Bills 22–3. **Drive: 10 plays, 60 yards, 5:49.**
- MIA – Jarvis Landry 1-yard pass from David Fales (pass failed), 6:16. Bills 22–9. **Drive: 10 plays, 75 yards, 5:25.**
- MIA – David Fales 1-yard run (Cody Parkey kick), 1:56. Bills 22–16. **Drive: 10 plays, 68 yards, 2:54.**

**Top passers**

- BUF – Tyrod Taylor – 19/27, 204 yds, 1 TD
- MIA – David Fales – 29/42, 265 yds, 1 TD, 1 INT

**Top rushers**

- BUF – Marcus Murphy – 7 rush, 41 yds
- MIA – Kenyan Drake – 14 rush, 75 yds

**Top receivers**

- BUF – Charles Clay – 6 rec, 64 yds
- MIA – Jarvis Landry – 9 rec, 92 yds, 1 TD

This game marked the end of Jay Cutler's, Jarvis Landry's, Ndamukong Suh's, and Mike Pouncey's tenure in Miami. Landry was ejected from the game after instigating a fight following a fourth-quarter touchdown reception.

=== Standings ===
==== Division ====
AFC East
	W	L	T	PCT	DIV	CONF	PF	PA	STK
^{(1)} New England Patriots	13	3	0	.813	5–1	10–2	458	296	W3
^{(6)} Buffalo Bills	9	7	0	.563	3–3	7–5	302	359	W1
Miami Dolphins	6	10	0	.375	2–4	5–7	281	393	L3
New York Jets	5	11	0	.313	2–4	5–7	298	382	L4

==== Conference ====
AFC
#	Team	Division	W	L	T	PCT	DIV	CONF	SOS	SOV	STK
**Division leaders**
1 (Note: New England claimed the No. 1 seed over Pittsburgh based on head-to-head victory.)	New England Patriots	East	13	3	0	.813	5–1	10–2	.484	.466	W3
2	Pittsburgh Steelers	North	13	3	0	.813	6–0	10–2	.453	.423	W2
3 (Note: Jacksonville claimed the No. 3 seed over Kansas City based on conference record.)	Jacksonville Jaguars	South	10	6	0	.625	4–2	9–3	.434	.394	L2
4	Kansas City Chiefs	West	10	6	0	.625	5–1	8–4	.477	.481	W4
**Wild Cards**
5 (Note: Tennessee finished ahead of Buffalo, Baltimore and Los Angeles Chargers based on conference record, claiming the No. 5 seed. Buffalo and Baltimore finished ahead of Los Angeles Chargers based on conference record. Buffalo claimed the No. 6 seed over Baltimore based on strength of victory.)	Tennessee Titans	South	9	7	0	.563	5–1	8–4	.434	.396	W1
6	Buffalo Bills	East	9	7	0	.563	3–3	7–5	.492	.396	W1
**Did not qualify for the postseason**
7	Baltimore Ravens	North	9	7	0	.563	3–3	7–5	.441	.299	L1
8	Los Angeles Chargers	West	9	7	0	.563	3–3	6–6	.457	.347	W2
9	Cincinnati Bengals	North	7	9	0	.438	3–3	6–6	.465	.321	W2
10 (Note: Oakland finished ahead of Miami based on head-to-head victory.)	Oakland Raiders	West	6	10	0	.375	2–4	5–7	.512	.396	L4
11	Miami Dolphins	East	6	10	0	.375	2–4	5–7	.543	.531	L3
12 (Note: Denver finished ahead of the New York Jets based on head-to-head victory.)	Denver Broncos	West	5	11	0	.313	2–4	4–8	.492	.413	L2
13	New York Jets	East	5	11	0	.313	2–4	5–7	.520	.438	L4
14 (Note: Indianapolis finished ahead of Houston based on head-to-head sweep.)	Indianapolis Colts	South	4	12	0	.250	2–4	3–9	.480	.219	W1
15	Houston Texans	South	4	12	0	.250	1–5	3–9	.516	.375	L6
16	Cleveland Browns	North	0	16	0	.000	0–6	0–12	.520	–	L16
**Tiebreakers** (Note: When breaking ties for three or more teams under the NFL's rules, they are first broken within divisions, then comparing only the highest ranked remaining team from each division.)
