= 2018 Miami Dolphins season =

53rd season in franchise history

- Owner: Stephen M. Ross
- General manager: Chris Grier
- Head coach: Adam Gase
- Home stadium: Hard Rock Stadium

Results
- Record: 7–9
- Division place: 2nd AFC East
- Playoffs: Did not qualify
- Pro Bowlers: CB Xavien Howard

Uniform
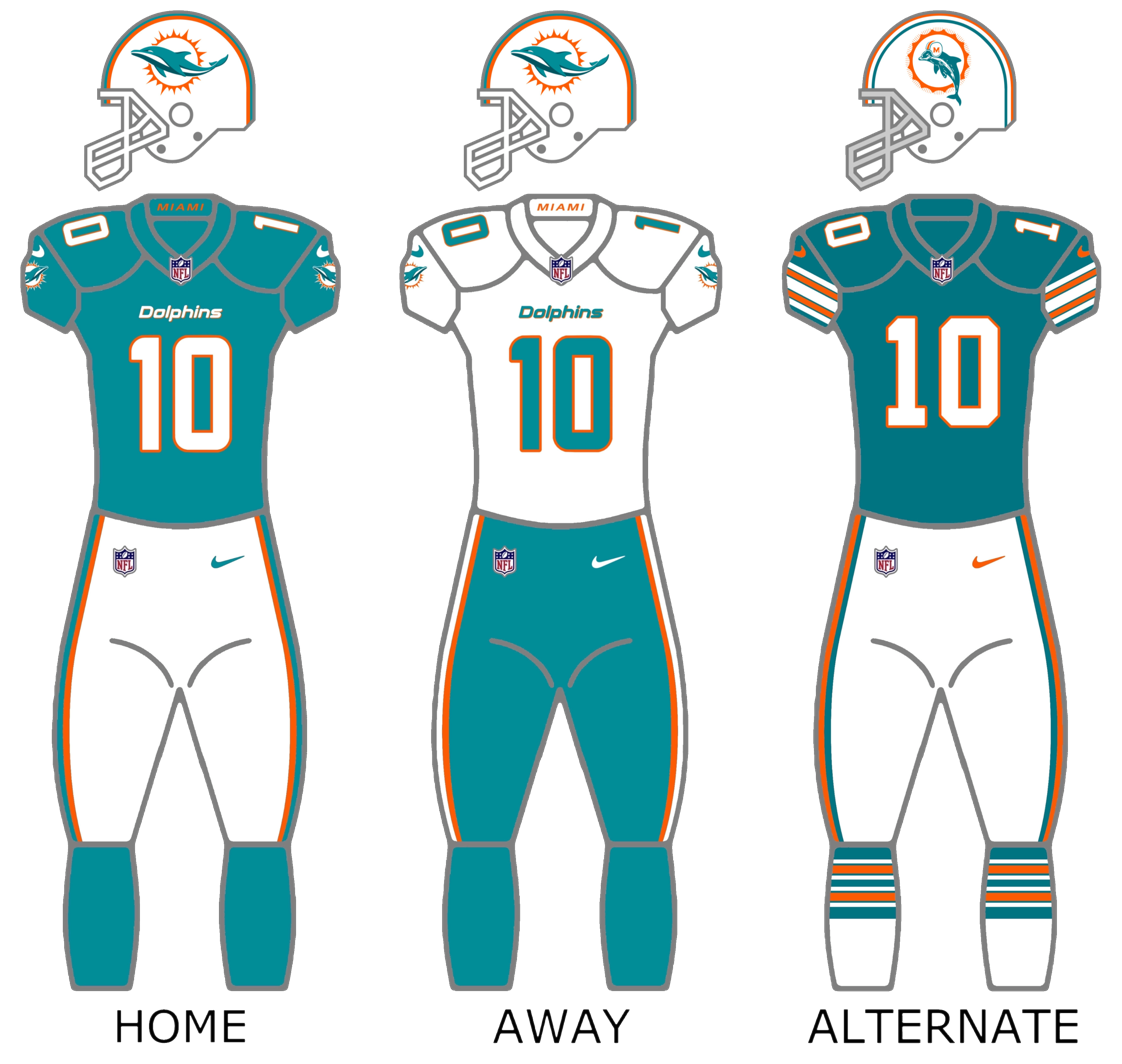

The 2018 season was the Miami Dolphins' 49th in the National Football League (NFL), their 53rd overall and their third and last under head coach Adam Gase. During the offseason, the Dolphins tweaked their uniforms' orange color to better align with their classical past and history. For the second straight season, they also brought back their throwback uniforms from the Shula/Marino eras and wore them for three games.

With quarterback Ryan Tannehill playing for the first time since 2016, the highlight of the Dolphins' season came during a memorable Week 14 win against division rival and defending back-to-back AFC champion New England Patriots, which prevented the Patriots from clinching the AFC East that week. However, the Dolphins would lose all of their remaining games and missed the playoffs for the second consecutive year. The 7–9 finish was also the team's second consecutive losing season, with all 7 wins decided by one possession scores.

== Roster changes ==
=== Signings ===
Position	Player	Age	2017 Team	Contract
WR	Danny Amendola	32	New England Patriots	2 years, $12 million
RB	Brandon Bolden	28	New England Patriots	1 year, $850,000
RB	Frank Gore	35	Indianapolis Colts	1 year, $1.015 million
QB	Brock Osweiler	27	Denver Broncos	1 year, $880,000
G	Josh Sitton	31	Chicago Bears	2 years, $18 million
WR	Albert Wilson	25	Kansas City Chiefs	3 years, $24 million

=== Departures ===
Position	Player	Age	2018 Team	Contract
DT	Ndamukong Suh	31	Los Angeles Rams	1 year, $14 million
C	Mike Pouncey	29	Los Angeles Chargers	2 years, $15 million

== Draft ==
2018 Miami Dolphins Draft
Round	Selection	Player	Position	College	Notes
1	11	Minkah Fitzpatrick	FS	Alabama	
2	42	Mike Gesicki	TE	Penn State	
3	73	Jerome Baker	OLB	Ohio State	
4	123	Durham Smythe	TE	Notre Dame	From Carolina via Cleveland
4	131	Kalen Ballage	HB	Arizona State	From New England via Philadelphia
6	209	Cornell Armstrong	CB	Southern Miss	From Kansas City
7	227	Quentin Poling	LB	Ohio	From San Francisco
7	229	Jason Sanders	K	New Mexico	

Draft trades

- The Dolphins traded wide receiver Jarvis Landry to Cleveland in exchange for Cleveland's fourth-round selection they acquired from Carolina (123rd overall), and a 2019 7th round pick Cleveland originally acquired from Pittsburgh.
- The Dolphins traded running back Jay Ajayi to Philadelphia in exchange for Philadelphia's fourth-round selection they acquired from New England (131st overall).
- The Dolphins traded their fifth-round selection (147th overall) to New Orleans in exchange for linebacker Stephone Anthony.
- The Dolphins traded the seventh-round selection they acquired from Tampa Bay (223rd overall) to San Francisco in exchange for San Francisco's seventh-round selection (227th overall) and center Daniel Kilgore.

== Staff ==
2018 Miami Dolphins staff
Front office: Chairman/managing general partner – Stephen Ross; Vice chairman/partner – Bruce Beal; Vice chairman – Jorge Perez; Vice chairman – Don Shula; Vice chairman – Matt Higgins; Vice chairman, president and CEO – Tom Garfinkel; General manager – Chris Grier; Executive vice president of football operations – Mike Tannenbaum; Senior director, football administration – Brandon Shore; Director, college scouting – Adam Engroff; Director, pro personnel – Anthony Hunt; Director of football research – Brian Fleury; Director, football research & strategy – Matt Sheldon; Senior director, football and player development – Joe Vitt; Director, football and player development – Clyde Christensen; Director, analytics – Dennis Lock; Head coaches: Head coach – Adam Gase; Associate head coach/special teams coordinator – Darren Rizzi; Assistant head coach/linebackers – Frank Bush; Assistant head coach/offense – Shawn Jefferson; Offensive coaches: Offensive coordinator – Dowell Loggains; Quarterbacks – Bo Hardegree; Running backs/run game coordinator – Eric Studesville; Wide receivers – Ben Johnson; Tight ends – Shane Day; Offensive line – Jeremiah Washburn; Assistant offensive line – Chris Kuper; Offensive quality control – Josh Grizzard	Defensive coaches: Defensive coordinator – Matt Burke; Defensive line – Kris Kocurek; Assistant defensive line – Andre Carter; Assistant linebackers – Charlie Bullen; Defensive backs – Tony Oden; Assistant defensive backs – Renaldo Hill; Defensive quality control – Rusty McKinney; Special teams coaches: Assistant special teams – Marwan Maalouf; Strength and conditioning: Head strength and conditioning – Dave Puloka; Assistant strength and conditioning – Jim Arthur

== Final roster ==
2018 Miami Dolphins roster
Quarterbacks (QB): 9 David Fales; 8 Brock Osweiler; 17 Ryan Tannehill; Running backs (RB): 27 Kalen Ballage; 38 Brandon Bolden; 32 Kenyan Drake; 34 Senorise Perry; Wide receivers (WR): 80 Danny Amendola; 14 Brice Butler; 88 Leonte Carroo; 84 Isaiah Ford; 11 DeVante Parker; 10 Kenny Stills; Tight ends (TE): 86 Mike Gesicki; 83 Nick O'Leary; 81 Durham Smythe	Offensive linemen (OL): 68 Isaac Asiata G; 77 Jesse Davis G; 70 Ja'Wuan James T; 73 Wesley Johnson C; 62 Ted Larsen G; 74 Zach Sterup T; 66 Travis Swanson C; 78 Laremy Tunsil T; 79 Sam Young T; Defensive linemen (DL): 50 Andre Branch DE; 56 Davon Godchaux DT; 90 Charles Harris DE; 97 Ziggy Hood DT; 75 Kendrick Norton DT; 94 Robert Quinn DE; 93 Akeem Spence DT; 91 Cameron Wake DE; 98 Sylvester Williams DT; 76 Jonathan Woodard DE	Linebackers (LB): 47 Kiko Alonso OLB; 44 Stephone Anthony OLB; 55 Jerome Baker OLB; 45 Mike Hull; 52 Raekwon McMillan MLB; Defensive backs (DB): 35 Walt Aikens SS; 31 Cornell Armstrong CB; 36 Jalen Davis CB; 29 Minkah Fitzpatrick CB; 25 Xavien Howard CB; 20 Reshad Jones SS; 28 Bobby McCain CB; 22 T. J. McDonald FS; 24 Torry McTyer CB; 26 Maurice Smith FS; Special teams (ST): 92 John Denney LS; 2 Matt Haack P; 7 Jason Sanders K	Practice squad: 53 James Burgess OLB; 37 Dee Delaney CB; 61 Connor Hilland C; 30 Chris Lammons SS; 18 Malcolm Lewis WR; 82 Francis Owusu WR; 65 Jamiyus Pittman DT; 51 Quentin Poling OLB; 18 Travis Rudolph WR (IR); 69 Garrison Smith DT (IR); 72 Jeremiah Valoaga DE; Reserve: 59 Chase Allen OLB (IR); 64 Jake Brendel C (IR); 85 A. J. Derby TE (IR); 4 Luke Falk QB (IR); 21 Frank Gore RB (IR); 19 Jakeem Grant WR (IR); 48 MarQueis Gray TE (IR); 95 William Hayes DE (IR); 67 Daniel Kilgore C (IR); 71 Josh Sitton G (IR); 23 Cordrea Tankersley CB (IR); 96 Vincent Taylor DT (IR); 15 Albert Wilson WR (IR); Rookies in italics 53 active, 15 reserve, 9 practice squad

== Preseason ==
Week	Date	Opponent	Result	Record	Venue	Recap
1	August 9	Tampa Bay Buccaneers	L 24–26	0–1	Hard Rock Stadium	Recap
2	August 17	at Carolina Panthers	L 20–27	0–2	Bank of America Stadium	Recap
3	August 25	Baltimore Ravens	L 10–27	0–3	Hard Rock Stadium	Recap
4	August 30	at Atlanta Falcons	W 34–7	1–3	Mercedes-Benz Stadium	Recap

== Regular season ==
The Dolphins' 2018 schedule was finalized and announced on April 19.

=== Schedule ===
Week	Date	Opponent	Result	Record	Venue	Recap
1	September 9	Tennessee Titans	**W** 27–20	1–0	Hard Rock Stadium	Recap
2	September 16	at **New York Jets**	**W** 20–12	2–0	MetLife Stadium	Recap
3	September 23	Oakland Raiders	**W** 28–20	3–0	Hard Rock Stadium	Recap
4	September 30	at **New England Patriots**	**L** 7–38	3–1	Gillette Stadium	Recap
5	October 7	at Cincinnati Bengals	**L** 17–27	3–2	Paul Brown Stadium	Recap
6	October 14	Chicago Bears	**W** 31–28 (OT)	4–2	Hard Rock Stadium	Recap
7	October 21	Detroit Lions	**L** 21–32	4–3	Hard Rock Stadium	Recap
8	October 25	at Houston Texans	**L** 23–42	4–4	NRG Stadium	Recap
9	November 4	**New York Jets**	**W** 13–6	5–4	Hard Rock Stadium	Recap
10	November 11	at Green Bay Packers	**L** 12–31	5–5	Lambeau Field	Recap
11	Bye					
12	November 25	at Indianapolis Colts	**L** 24–27	5–6	Lucas Oil Stadium	Recap
13	December 2	**Buffalo Bills**	**W** 21–17	6–6	Hard Rock Stadium	Recap
14	December 9	**New England Patriots**	**W** 34–33	7–6	Hard Rock Stadium	Recap
15	December 16	at Minnesota Vikings	**L** 17–41	7–7	U.S. Bank Stadium	Recap
16	December 23	Jacksonville Jaguars	**L** 7–17	7–8	Hard Rock Stadium	Recap
17	December 30	at **Buffalo Bills**	**L** 17–42	7–9	New Era Field	Recap

Note: Intra-division opponents are in bold text.

=== Game summaries ===
==== Week 1: vs. Tennessee Titans ====
Week One: Tennessee Titans at Miami Dolphins – Game summary

Quarter	1	2	3	4	Total
Titans	3	0	0	17	**20**
**Dolphins**	0	7	3	17	**27**

at Hard Rock Stadium, Miami Gardens, Florida

- Date: September 9
- Game time: 1:00 p.m. EDT
- Game weather: 89 °F (32 °C), Scattered Showers
- Game attendance: 65,184
- Referee: Jerome Boger
- TV announcers (Fox): Sam Rosen, Cris Carter and Sarah Kustok
- Recap, Gamebook

Game information

**First quarter**

- TEN – Ryan Succop 47-yard field goal, 10:18. Titans 3–0. **Drive: 9 plays, 37 yards, 4:42.**

**Second quarter**

- MIA – Kenny Stills 10-yard pass from Ryan Tannehill (Jason Sanders kick), 11:21. Dolphins 7–3. **Drive: 12 plays, 98 yards, 5:21.**

**Third quarter**

- MIA – Jason Sanders 27-yard field goal, 4:05. Dolphins 10–3. **Drive: 6 plays, 19 yards, 2:37.**

**Fourth quarter**

- TEN – Dion Lewis 4-yard run (Ryan Succop kick), 14:17. Tied 10–10. **Drive: 9 plays, 75 yards, 4:48.**
- MIA – Jakeem Grant 102-yard kick return (Jason Sanders kick), 14:04. Dolphins 17–10.
- MIA – Kenny Stills 75-yard pass from Ryan Tannehill (Jason Sanders kick), 10:22. Dolphins 24–10. **Drive: 4 plays, 89 yards, 1:17.**
- TEN – Darius Jennings 94-yard kick return (Ryan Succop kick), 10:11. Dolphins 24–17.
- MIA – Jason Sanders 30-yard field goal, 3:49. Dolphins 27–17. **Drive: 4 plays, 0 yards, 2:15.**
- TEN – Ryan Succop 53-yard field goal, 0:11. Dolphins 27–20. **Drive: 6 plays, 45 yards, 0:56.**

**Top passers**

- TEN – Blaine Gabbert – 11/22, 117 yards, INT
- MIA – Ryan Tannehill – 20/28, 230 yards, 2 TD, 2 INT

**Top rushers**

- TEN – Dion Lewis – 16 carries, 75 yards, TD
- MIA – Frank Gore – 9 carries, 61 yards

**Top receivers**

- TEN – Corey Davis – 6 receptions, 62 yards
- MIA – Kenny Stills – 4 receptions, 106 yards, 2 TD

Due to two weather delays, the game lasted for 7 hours and 10 minutes, the longest game since the AFL–NFL merger in 1970. Coincidentally, wide receiver Danny Amendola met with former teammates Malcolm Butler and Dion Lewis. The three played for the New England Patriots from 2015 to 2017 and helped them win Super Bowl LI over the Atlanta Falcons.

==== Week 2: at New York Jets ====
Week Two: Miami Dolphins at New York Jets – Game summary

Quarter	1	2	3	4	Total
**Dolphins**	7	13	0	0	**20**
Jets	0	0	6	6	**12**

at MetLife Stadium, East Rutherford, New Jersey

- Date: September 16
- Game time: 1:00 p.m. EDT
- Game weather: 80 °F (27 °C), Sunny
- Game attendance: 77,982
- Referee: Brad Allen
- TV announcers (CBS): Kevin Harlan, Rich Gannon and Steve Tasker
- Recap, Gamebook

Game information

**First quarter**

- MIA – Kenyan Drake 6-yard run (Jason Sanders kick), 1:16. Dolphins 7-0. **Drive: 3 plays, 15 yards, 1:29.**

**Second quarter**

- MIA – Albert Wilson 29-yard pass from Ryan Tannehill (Jason Sanders kick), 4:19. Dolphins 14–0. **Drive: 2 plays, 49 yards, 0:46.**
- MIA – A. J. Derby 19-yard pass from Ryan Tannehill (kick failed), 0:46. Dolphins 20–0. **Drive: 8 plays, 62 yards, 1:47.**

**Third quarter**

- NYJ – Bilal Powell 28-yard pass from Sam Darnold (kick failed), 11:58. Dolphins 20–6. **Drive: 7 plays, 75 yards, 3:09.**

**Fourth quarter**

- NYJ – Jason Myers 55-yard field goal, 10:11. Dolphins 20–9. **Drive: 11 plays, 22 yards, 6:14.**
- NYJ – Jason Myers 41-yard field goal, 6:00. Dolphins 20–12. **Drive: 10 plays, 63 yards, 3:05.**

**Top passers**

- MIA – Ryan Tannehill – 17/23, 168 yards, 2 TD
- NYJ – Sam Darnold – 25/41, 334 yards, TD, 2 INT

**Top rushers**

- MIA – Kenyan Drake – 11 rushes, 53 yards, TD
- NYJ – Isaiah Crowell – 12 rushes, 35 yards

**Top receivers**

- MIA – Albert Wilson – 3 receptions, 37 yards, TD
- NYJ – Quincy Enunwa – 7 receptions, 92 yards

==== Week 3: vs. Oakland Raiders ====
Week Three: Oakland Raiders at Miami Dolphins – Game summary

Quarter	1	2	3	4	Total
Raiders	7	3	7	3	**20**
**Dolphins**	0	7	7	14	**28**

at Hard Rock Stadium, Miami Gardens, Florida

- Date: September 23
- Game time: 1:00 p.m. EDT
- Game weather: 90 °F (32 °C), Partly Cloudy
- Game attendance: 65,667
- Referee: Shawn Hochuli
- TV announcers (CBS): Greg Gumbel, Trent Green, Bruce Arians and Melanie Collins
- Recap, Gamebook

Game information

**First quarter**

- OAK – Jordy Nelson 12-yard pass from Derek Carr (Mike Nugent kick), 13:34. Raiders 7–0. **Drive: 4 plays, 75 yards, 1:26.**

**Second quarter**

- MIA – Kenny Stills 34-yard pass from Ryan Tannehill (Jason Sanders kick), 12:11. Tied 7–7. **Drive: 3 plays, 35 yards, 1:31.**
- OAK – Mike Nugent 25-yard field goal, 3:34. Raiders 10–7. **Drive: 16 plays, 68 yards, 8:37.**

**Third quarter**

- OAK – Marshawn Lynch 1-yard run (Mike Nugent kick), 2:58. Raiders 17–7. **Drive: 15 plays, 67 yards, 9:44.**
- MIA – Jakeem Grant 18-yard pass from Ryan Tannehill (Jason Sanders kick), 0:55. Raiders 17–14. **Drive: 4 plays, 70 yards, 2:03.**

**Fourth quarter**

- MIA – Jakeem Grant 52-yard pass from Albert Wilson (Jason Sanders kick), 7:18. Dolphins 21–17. **Drive: 2 plays, 70 yards, 0:48.**
- MIA – Albert Wilson 74-yard pass from Ryan Tannehill (Jason Sanders kick), 2:00. Dolphins 28–17. **Drive: 2 plays, 80 yards, 0:54.**
- OAK – Mike Nugent 52-yard field goal, 0:20. Dolphins 28–20. **Drive: 6 plays, 41 yards, 1:40.**

**Top passers**

- OAK – Derek Carr – 27/39, 345 yards, 1 TD, 2 INT
- MIA – Ryan Tannehill – 17/23, 289 yards, 3 TD

**Top rushers**

- OAK – Marshawn Lynch – 19 carries, 64 yards, 1 TD
- MIA – Ryan Tannehill – 3 carries, 26 yards

**Top receivers**

- OAK – Jordy Nelson – 6 receptions, 173 yards, 1 TD
- MIA – Kenny Stills – 3 receptions, 61 yards, 1 TD

With the win, the Dolphins improved to 3–0, their first such start since 2013.

==== Week 4: at New England Patriots ====
Week Four: Miami Dolphins at New England Patriots – Game summary

Quarter	1	2	3	4	Total
Dolphins	0	0	0	7	**7**
**Patriots**	3	21	7	7	**38**

at Gillette Stadium, Foxborough, Massachusetts

- Date: September 30
- Game time: 1:00 p.m. EDT
- Game weather: 65 °F (18 °C), Sunny and Warm
- Game attendance: 65,878
- Referee: Alex Kemp
- TV announcers (CBS): Kevin Harlan, Rich Gannon and Steve Tasker
- Recap, Gamebook

Game information

**First quarter**

- NE – Stephen Gostkowski 20-yard field goal, 5:28. Patriots 3–0. **Drive: 13 plays, 74 yards, 6:37.**

**Second quarter**

- NE – Cordarrelle Patterson 55-yard pass from Tom Brady (Stephen Gostkowski kick), 12:10. Patriots 10–0. **Drive: 5 plays, 67 yards, 2:08.**
- NE – James White 22-yard run (Stephen Gostkowski kick), 7:29. Patriots 17–0. **Drive: 1 plays, 22 yards, 0:07.**
- NE – Phillip Dorsett 9-yard pass from Tom Brady (Stephen Gostkowski kick), 0:18. Patriots 24–0. **Drive: 15 plays, 85 yards, 5:31.**

**Third quarter**

- NE – James White 14-yard pass from Tom Brady (Stephen Gostkowski kick), 6:49. Patriots 31–0. **Drive: 9 plays, 59 yards, 5:01.**

**Fourth quarter**

- NE – Sony Michel 10-yard run (Stephen Gostkowski kick), 13:43. Patriots 38–0. **Drive: 12 plays, 90 yards, 6:30.**
- MIA – Frank Gore 6-yard pass from Brock Osweiler (Jason Sanders kick), 2:42. Patriots 38–7. **Drive: 13 plays, 75 yards, 7:10.**

**Top passers**

- MIA – Ryan Tannehill – 11/20, 100 yards, 1 INT
- NE – Tom Brady – 23/35, 274 yards, 3 TD, 2 INT

**Top rushers**

- MIA – Frank Gore – 11 carries, 41 yards
- NE – Sony Michel – 25 carries, 112 yards, 1 TD

**Top receivers**

- MIA – Albert Wilson – 4 receptions, 19 yards
- NE – James White – 8 receptions, 68 yards, 1 TD

With their first loss of the season, the Dolphins failed to earn their first 4–0 start since 1995, during the Dan Marino era and Don Shula's final year as the Dolphins' head coach.

==== Week 5: at Cincinnati Bengals ====
Week Five: Miami Dolphins at Cincinnati Bengals – Game summary

Quarter	1	2	3	4	Total
Dolphins	0	14	3	0	**17**
**Bengals**	0	0	3	24	**27**

at Paul Brown Stadium, Cincinnati, Ohio

- Date: October 7
- Game time: 1:00 p.m. EDT
- Game weather: 82 °F (28 °C), Mostly Sunny
- Game attendance: 52,708
- Referee: Craig Wrolstad
- TV announcers (CBS): Kevin Harlan, Rich Gannon and Steve Tasker
- Recap, Gamebook

Game information

**First quarter**

- No scoring plays.

**Second quarter**

- MIA – Kenyan Drake 22-yard pass from Ryan Tannehill (Jason Sanders kick), 7:22. Dolphins 7–0. **Drive: 11 plays, 95 yards, 6:08.**
- MIA – Jakeem Grant 71-yard punt return (Jason Sanders kick), 0:23. Dolphins 14–0.

**Third quarter**

- MIA – Jason Sanders 42-yard field goal, 9:25. Dolphins 17–0. **Drive: 6 plays, 28 yards, 3:25.**
- CIN – Randy Bullock 51-yard field goal, 5:07. Dolphins 17–3. **Drive: 8 plays, 42 yards, 4:18.**

**Fourth quarter**

- CIN – Joe Mixon 18-yard pass from Andy Dalton (Randy Bullock kick), 14:54. Dolphins 17–10. **Drive: 8 plays, 71 yards, 3:30.**
- CIN – Michael Johnson 22-yard interception return (Randy Bullock kick), 11:43. Tied 17–17.
- CIN – Randy Bullock 20-yard field goal, 3:30. Bengals 20–17. **Drive: 9 plays, 62 yards, 4:00.**
- CIN – Sam Hubbard 19-yard fumble return (Randy Bullock kick), 2:37. Bengals 27–17.

**Top passers**

- MIA – Ryan Tannehill – 20/35, 185 yards, 1 TD, 2 INT
- CIN – Andy Dalton – 20/30, 248 yards, 1 TD, 1 INT

**Top rushers**

- MIA – Frank Gore – 12 carries, 63 yards
- CIN – Joe Mixon – 22 carries, 93 yards

**Top receivers**

- MIA – Kenyan Drake – 7 receptions, 69 yards, 1 TD
- CIN – A. J. Green – 6 receptions, 112 yards

==== Week 6: vs. Chicago Bears ====
Week Six: Chicago Bears at Miami Dolphins – Game summary

Quarter	1	2	3	4	OT	Total
Bears	0	0	21	7	0	**28**
**Dolphins**	7	0	6	15	3	**31**

at Hard Rock Stadium, Miami Gardens, Florida

- Date: October 14
- Game time: 1:00 p.m. EDT
- Game weather: 89 °F (32 °C), partly cloudy
- Game attendance: 65,791
- Referee: Walt Anderson
- TV announcers (Fox): Brian Custer, Greg Jennings and Doug Gottlieb
- Recap, Gamebook

Game information

**First quarter**

- MIA – Nick O'Leary 5-yard pass from Brock Osweiler (Jason Sanders kick), 8:42. Dolphins 7–0. **Drive: 7 plays, 54 yards, 3:39.**

**Second quarter**

- No scoring plays.

**Third quarter**

- CHI – Trey Burton 9-yard pass from Mitchell Trubisky (Cody Parkey kick), 13:27. Tied 7–7. **Drive: 3 plays, 75 yards, 1:37.**
- CHI – Allen Robinson 12-yard pass from Mitchell Trubisky (Cody Parkey kick), 11:33. Bears 14–7. **Drive: 1 play, 12 yards, 0:05.**
- MIA – Jason Sanders 50-yard field goal, 7:55. Bears 14–10. **Drive: 8 plays, 43 yards, 3:38.**
- CHI – Tarik Cohen 21-yard run (Cody Parkey kick), 6:55. Bears 21–10. **Drive: 3 plays, 75 yards, 1:00.**
- MIA – Jason Sanders 25-yard field goal, 0:30. Bears 21–13. **Drive: 11 plays, 68 yards, 6:25.**

**Fourth quarter**

- MIA – Albert Wilson 43-yard pass from Brock Osweiler (Brock Osweiler-Kenny Stills pass), 9:19. Tied 21–21. **Drive: 6 plays, 80 yards, 3:05.**
- CHI – Anthony Miller 29-yard pass from Mitchell Trubisky (Cody Parkey kick), 3:23. Bears 28–21. **Drive: 11 plays, 75 yards, 5:51.**
- MIA – Albert Wilson 75-yard pass from Brock Osweiler (Jason Sanders kick), 3:17. Tied 28–28. **Drive: 1 play, 75 yards, 0:16.**

**Overtime**

- MIA – Jason Sanders 47-yard field goal, 0:03. Dolphins 31–28. **Drive: 6 plays, 28 yards, 1:55.**

**Top passers**

- CHI – Mitchell Trubisky – 22/31, 316 yards, 3 TD, INT
- MIA – Brock Osweiler – 28/44, 380 yards, 3 TD, 2 INT

**Top rushers**

- CHI – Jordan Howard – 14 rushes, 69 yards
- MIA – Frank Gore – 15 rushes, 101 yards

**Top receivers**

- CHI – Taylor Gabriel – 5 receptions, 110 yards
- MIA – Albert Wilson – 6 receptions, 155 yards, 2 TD

A last-second field goal kick by Jason Saunders barely averted a tie and gave the Dolphins the win in overtime.

==== Week 7: vs. Detroit Lions ====
Week Seven: Detroit Lions at Miami Dolphins – Game summary

Quarter	1	2	3	4	Total
**Lions**	7	10	9	6	**32**
Dolphins	0	7	7	7	**21**

at Hard Rock Stadium, Miami Gardens, Florida

- Date: October 21
- Game time: 1:00 p.m. EDT
- Game weather: 89 °F (32 °C), partly cloudy
- Game attendance: 65,265
- Referee: Jerome Boger
- TV announcers (Fox): Dick Stockton, Mark Schlereth and Jennifer Hale
- Recap, Gamebook

Game information

**First quarter**

- DET – Michael Roberts 15-yard pass from Matthew Stafford (Matt Prater kick), 9:12. **Drive: 6 plays, 64 yards, 3:36.** Lions 7–0.

**Second quarter**

- DET – Matt Prater 29-yard field goal, 12:39. **Drive: 6 plays, 85 yards, 2:38.** Lions 10–0.
- MIA – Kenny Stills 5-yard pass from Brock Osweiler (Jason Sanders kick), 7:33. **Drive: 11 plays, 77 yards, 5:01.** Lions 10–7.
- DET – LeGarrette Blount 2-yard run (Matt Prater kick), 1:02. **Drive: 12 plays, 75 yards, 6:31.** Lions 17–7.

**Third quarter**

- DET – Matt Prater 28-yard field goal, 8:36. **Drive: 12 plays, 65 yards, 6:28.** Lions 20–7.
- MIA – Kenyan Drake 54-yard run (Jason Sanders kick), 7:06. **Drive: 5 plays, 75 yards, 1:26.** Lions 20–14.
- DET – Michael Roberts 4-yard pass from Matthew Stafford, 3:16. **Drive: 6 plays, 75 yards, 3:50.** Lions 26–14.

**Fourth quarter**

- DET – Matt Prater 35-yard field goal, 10:09. **Drive: 7 plays, 63 yards, 3:59.** Lions 29–14.
- MIA – Danny Amendola 24-yard pass from Brock Osweiler (Jason Sanders kick), 6:00. **Drive: 10 plays, 75 yards, 4:04.** Lions 29–21.
- DET – Matt Prater 50-yard field goal, 2:00. **Drive: 8 plays, 44 yards, 4:05.** Lions 32–21.

**Top passers**

- DET – Matthew Stafford – 18/22, 217 yards, 2 TD
- MIA – Brock Osweiler – 22/31, 329 yards, 2 TD

**Top rushers**

- DET – Kerryon Johnson – 19 carries, 158 yards
- MIA – Kenyan Drake – 6 carries, 72 yards, TD

**Top receivers**

- DET – Michael Roberts – 3 receptions, 48 yards, 2 TD
- MIA – Danny Amendola – 6 receptions, 84 yards, TD

The Dolphins were seeking their first win over the Lions since 2006.

==== Week 8: at Houston Texans ====
Week Eight: Miami Dolphins at Houston Texans – Game summary

Quarter	1	2	3	4	Total
Dolphins	7	3	10	3	**23**
**Texans**	7	7	14	14	**42**

at NRG Stadium, Houston, Texas

- Date: October 25
- Game time: 8:20 p.m. EDT/7:20 p.m. CDT
- Game weather: Played indoors (retractable roof closed)
- Game attendance: 71,726
- Referee: Shawn Smith
- TV announcers (Fox/NFLN): Joe Buck, Troy Aikman, Erin Andrews and Kristina Pink
- Recap, Gamebook

Game information

**First quarter**

- MIA – Kenyan Drake 12-yard run (Jason Sanders kick), 4:58. Dolphins 7–0. **Drive: 9 plays, 69 yards, 4:32.**
- HOU – Lamar Miller 2-yard run (Kaʻimi Fairbairn kick), 0:31. Tied 7–7. **Drive: 9 plays, 75 yards, 4:27.**

**Second quarter**

- HOU – Jordan Thomas 13-yard pass from Deshaun Watson (Kaʻimi Fairbairn kick), 14:14. Texans 14–7. **Drive: 2 plays, 16 yards, 0:36.**
- MIA – Jason Sanders 37-yard field goal, 3:01. Texans 14–10. **Drive: 10 plays, 61 yards, 4:32.**

**Third quarter**

- HOU – Jordan Thomas 2-yard pass from Deshaun Watson (Kaʻimi Fairbairn kick), 11:34. Texans 21–10. **Drive: 6 plays, 75 yards, 3:26.**
- MIA – Kenyan Drake 28-yard pass from Danny Amendola (Jason Sanders kick), 4:55. Texans 21–17. **Drive: 4 plays, 51 yards, 1:46.**
- HOU – Will Fuller 73-yard pass from Deshaun Watson (Kaʻimi Fairbairn kick), 4:21. Texans 28–17. **Drive: 2 plays, 75 yards, 0:34.**
- MIA – Jason Sanders 41-yard field goal, 0:39. Texans 28–20. **Drive: 7 plays, 52 yards, 3:42.**

**Fourth quarter**

- HOU – DeAndre Hopkins 49-yard pass from Deshaun Watson (Kaʻimi Fairbairn kick), 14:49. Texans 35–20. **Drive: 2 plays, 49 yards, 0:47.**
- MIA – Jason Sanders 46-yard field goal, 11:30. Texans 35–23. **Drive: 7 plays, 46 yards, 3:19.**
- HOU – DeAndre Hopkins 2-yard pass from Deshaun Watson (Kaʻimi Fairbairn kick), 7:34. Texans 42–23. **Drive: 6 plays, 45 yards, 3:52.**

**Top passers**

- MIA – Brock Osweiler – 21/37, 241 yards, INT
- HOU – Deshaun Watson – 16/20, 239 yards, 5 TD

**Top rushers**

- MIA – Kenyan Drake – 12 carries, 58 yards, TD
- HOU – Lamar Miller – 18 carries, 133 yards, TD

**Top receivers**

- MIA – DeVante Parker – 6 receptions, 134 yards
- HOU – Will Fuller – 5 receptions, 124 yards, TD

==== Week 9: vs. New York Jets ====
Week Nine: New York Jets at Miami Dolphins – Game summary

Quarter	1	2	3	4	Total
Jets	0	3	0	3	**6**
**Dolphins**	0	6	0	7	**13**

at Hard Rock Stadium, Miami Gardens, Florida

- Date: November 4
- Game time: 1:00 p.m. EST
- Game weather: 87 °F (31 °C), partly sunny
- Game attendance: 65,533
- Referee: Walt Coleman
- TV announcers (CBS): Andrew Catalon, James Lofton and Gene Steratore
- Recap, Gamebook

Game information

**First quarter**

- No scoring plays.

**Second quarter**

- MIA – Jason Sanders 43-yard field goal, 12:39. Dolphins 3–0. **Drive: 6 plays, 18 yards, 3:15.**
- MIA – Jason Sanders 27-yard field goal, 1:11. Dolphins 6–0. **Drive: 14 plays, 51 yards, 6:03.**
- NYJ – Jason Myers 48-yard field goal, 0:20. Dolphins 6–3. **Drive: 7 plays, 45 yards, 0:51.**

**Third quarter**

- No scoring plays.

**Fourth quarter**

- MIA – Jerome Baker 25-yard interception return (Jason Sanders kick), 10:48. Dolphins 13–3.
- NYJ – Jason Myers 56-yard field goal, 5:57. Dolphins 13–6. **Drive: 9 plays, 37 yards, 4:51.**

**Top passers**

- NYJ – Sam Darnold – 21/39, 229 yards, 4 INT
- MIA – Brock Osweiler – 15/24, 139 yards

**Top rushers**

- NYJ – Isaiah Crowell – 13 carries, 49 yards
- MIA – Frank Gore – 20 carries, 53 yards

**Top receivers**

- NYJ – Chris Herndon – 4 receptions, 62 yards
- MIA – Danny Amendola – 5 receptions, 47 yards

==== Week 10: at Green Bay Packers ====
Week Ten: Miami Dolphins at Green Bay Packers – Game summary

Quarter	1	2	3	4	Total
Dolphins	3	6	3	0	**12**
**Packers**	7	7	14	3	**31**

at Lambeau Field, Green Bay, Wisconsin

- Date: November 11
- Game time: 4:25 p.m. EST/3:25 p.m. CST
- Game weather: 33 °F (1 °C), cloudy
- Game attendance: 78,076
- Referee: Clay Martin
- TV announcers (CBS): Kevin Harlan, Rich Gannon and Steve Tasker
- Recap, Gamebook

Game information

First quarter

- GB – Davante Adams 7-yard pass from Aaron Rodgers (Mason Crosby kick), 6:07. Packers 7–0. **Drive: 8 plays, 70 yards, 4:54.**
- MIA – Jason Sanders 37-yard field goal, 1:22. Packers 7–3. **Drive: 7 plays, 26 yards, 3:20.**

Second quarter

- GB – Aaron Jones 2-yard run (Mason Crosby kick), 15:00. Packers 14–3. **Drive: 3 plays, 71 yards, 1:25.**
- MIA – Jason Sanders 25-yard field goal, 10:33. Packers 14–6. **Drive: 10 plays, 78 yards, 4:24.**
- MIA – Jason Sanders 47-yard field goal, 2:54. Packers 14–9. **Drive: 5 plays, 16 yards, 2:42.**

Third quarter

- MIA – Jason Sanders 40-yard field goal, 11:43. Packers 14–12. **Drive: 4 plays, 6 yards, 1:23.**
- GB – Aaron Jones 10-yard run (Mason Crosby kick), 9:38. Packers 21–12. **Drive: 5 plays, 60 yards, 2:10.**
- GB – Davante Adams 25-yard pass from Aaron Rodgers (Mason Crosby kick), 7:31. Packers 28–12. **Drive: 3 plays, 27 yards, 1:27.**

Fourth quarter

- GB – Mason Crosby 38-yard field goal, 8:57. Packers 31–12. **Drive: 11 plays, 60 yards, 5:58.**

Top passers

- MIA – Brock Osweiler – 23/37, 213 yards, INT
- GB – Aaron Rodgers – 19/28, 199 yards, 2 TD

Top rushers

- MIA – Frank Gore – 13 carries, 90 yards
- GB – Aaron Jones – 15 carries, 145 yards, 2 TD

Top receivers

- MIA – Danny Amendola – 7 receptions, 72 yards
- GB – Davante Adams – 4 receptions, 57 yards, 2 TD

==== Week 12: at Indianapolis Colts ====
Week Twelve: Miami Dolphins at Indianapolis Colts – Game summary

Quarter	1	2	3	4	Total
Dolphins	7	7	3	7	**24**
**Colts**	7	7	0	13	**27**

at Lucas Oil Stadium, Indianapolis, Indiana

- Date: November 25
- Game time: 4:25 p.m. EST
- Game weather: Played indoors (retractable roof closed)
- Game attendance: 57,069
- Referee: Clete Blakeman
- TV announcers (CBS): Greg Gumbel, Trent Green, Bruce Arians and Melanie Collins
- Recap, Gamebook

Game information

**First quarter**

- MIA – Kenyan Drake 33-yard pass from Ryan Tannehill (Jason Sanders kick), 12:22. Dolphins 7–0. **Drive: 6 plays, 75 yards, 2:38.**
- IND – Eric Ebron 14-yard pass from Andrew Luck (Adam Vinatieri kick), 9:37. Tied 7–7. **Drive: 5 plays, 75 yards, 2:45.**

**Second quarter**

- IND – Jack Doyle 1-yard pass from Andrew Luck (Adam Vinatieri kick), 1:44. Colts 14–7. **Drive: 13 plays, 73 yards, 5:49.**
- MIA – Leonte Carroo 74-yard pass from Ryan Tannehill (Jason Sanders kick), 1:00. Tied 14–14. **Drive: 2 plays, 75 yards, 0:44.**

**Third quarter**

- MIA – Jason Sanders 29-yard field goal, 9:14. Dolphins 17–14. **Drive: 8 plays, 31 yards, 4:18.**

**Fourth quarter**

- MIA – Kenyan Drake 14-yard rush (Jason Sanders kick), 13:36. Dolphins 24–14. **Drive: 9 plays, 62 yards, 4:55.**
- IND – Adam Vinatieri 46-yard field goal, 8:26. Dolphins 24–17. **Drive: 10 plays, 47 yards, 5:10.**
- IND – Eric Ebron 12-yard pass from Andrew Luck (Adam Vinatieri kick), 4:25. Tied 24–24. **Drive: 7 plays, 89 yards, 3:18.**
- IND – Adam Vinatieri 32-yard field goal, 0:00. Colts 27–24. **Drive: 7 plays, 44 yards, 2:38.**

**Top passers**

- MIA – Ryan Tannehill – 17/25, 204 yards, 2 TD
- IND – Andrew Luck – 30/37, 343 yards, 3 TD, 2 INT

**Top rushers**

- MIA – Frank Gore – 14 carries, 67 yards
- IND – Marlon Mack – 15 carries, 85 yards

**Top receivers**

- MIA – Kenyan Drake – 5 receptions, 64 yards, 1 TD
- IND – T. Y. Hilton – 7 receptions, 125 yards

==== Week 13: vs. Buffalo Bills ====
Week Thirteen: Buffalo Bills at Miami Dolphins – Game summary

Quarter	1	2	3	4	Total
Bills	0	6	3	8	**17**
**Dolphins**	7	7	0	7	**21**

at Hard Rock Stadium, Miami Gardens, Florida

- Date: December 2
- Game time: 1:00 p.m. EST
- Game weather: 86 °F (30 °C), partly cloudy
- Game attendance: 65,155
- Referee: Shawn Hochuli
- TV announcers (CBS): Andrew Catalon and James Lofton
- Recap, Gamebook

Game information

**First quarter**

- MIA – DeVante Parker 18-yard pass from Ryan Tannehill (Jason Sanders kick), 9:42. Dolphins 7–0. **Drive: 10 plays, 75 yards, 5:18.**

**Second quarter**

- BUF – Zay Jones 15-yard pass from Josh Allen (kick failed), 11:44. Dolphins 7–6. **Drive: 9 plays, 55 yards, 5:05.**
- MIA – Kenyan Drake 3-yard pass from Ryan Tannehill (Jason Sanders kick), 0:40. Dolphins 14–6. **Drive: 6 plays, 36 yards, 3:01.**

**Third quarter**

- BUF – Stephen Hauschka 32-yard field goal, 9:02. Dolphins 14–9. **Drive: 10 plays, 79 yards, 5:58.**

**Fourth quarter**

- BUF – Zay Jones 25-yard pass from Josh Allen (Josh Allen-Zay Jones pass), 12:00. Bills 17–14. **Drive: 6 plays, 83 yards, 3:24.**
- MIA – Kenny Stills 13-yard pass from Ryan Tannehill (Jason Sanders kick), 8:42. Dolphins 21–17. **Drive: 6 plays, 75 yards, 3:18.**

**Top passers**

- BUF – Josh Allen – 18/33, 231 yards, 2 TD, 2 INT
- MIA – Ryan Tannehill – 16/24, 137 yards, 3 TD, 1 INT

**Top rushers**

- BUF – Josh Allen – 9 carries, 135 yards
- MIA – Kenyan Drake – 7 carries, 31 yards

**Top receivers**

- BUF – Zay Jones – 4 receptions, 67 yards, 2 TD
- MIA – DeVante Parker – 4 receptions, 43 yards, 1 TD

With the win the Dolphins improved to 6-6. However this would turn out to be their last win over Buffalo until 2022.

==== Week 14: vs. New England Patriots ====
Week Fourteen: New England Patriots at Miami Dolphins – Game summary

Quarter	1	2	3	4	Total
Patriots	6	21	0	6	**33**
**Dolphins**	7	14	7	6	**34**

at Hard Rock Stadium, Miami Gardens, Florida

- Date: December 9
- Game time: 1:00 p.m. EST
- Game weather: 84 °F (29 °C), mostly cloudy
- Game attendance: 66,087
- Referee: Pete Morelli
- TV announcers (CBS): Ian Eagle, Dan Fouts and Evan Washburn
- Recap, Gamebook

Game information

**First quarter**

- NE - James Develin 2-yard run (Stephen Gostkowski missed PAT), 8:13. Patriots 6-0. **Drive: 12 plays, 75 yards, 6:47**
- MIA - Kenny Stills 7-yard pass from Ryan Tannehill (Jason Sanders kick), 2:41. Dolphins 7-6. **Drive: 5 plays, 75 yards, 2:41**

**Second quarter**

- NE - Julian Edelman 2-yard pass from Tom Brady (Stephen Gostkowski kick), 14:14. Patriots 13-7. **Drive: 5 plays, 18 yards, 2:04**
- MIA - Brandon Bolden 54-yard run (Jason Sanders kick), 13:26. Dolphins 14-13. **Drive: 2 plays, 75 yards, 0:48**
- NE - Cordarrelle Patterson 37-yard pass from Tom Brady (Stephen Gostkowski kick), 10:32. Patriots 20-14. **Drive: 6 plays, 75 yards, 2:54**
- MIA - Brandon Bolden 6-yard run (Jason Sanders kick), 7:28. Dolphins 21-20. **Drive: 6 plays, 75 yards, 3:04**
- NE - Rob Gronkowski 16-yard pass from Tom Brady, 3:49. Patriots 27-21. **Drive: 8 plays, 75 yards, 3:39**

**Third quarter**

- MIA - Brice Butler 23-yard pass from Ryan Tannehill (Jason Sanders kick), 3:58. Dolphins 28-27. **Drive: 4 plays, 68 yards, 2:23**

**Fourth quarter**

- NE - Stephen Gostkowski 32-yard field goal, 6:50. Patriots 30-28. **Drive: 8 plays, 55 yards, 3:43**
- NE - Stephen Gostkowski 22-yard field goal, 0:21. Patriots 33-28. **Drive: 10 plays, 69 yards, 4:10**
- MIA - Kenyan Drake 52-yard pass from DeVante Parker after laterals from Kenny Stills and Ryan Tannehill. Dolphins 34-33. **Drive: 1 play, 69 yards, 0:16**

**Top passers**

- NE – Tom Brady - 27/43, 358 yards, 3 TD
- MIA – Ryan Tannehill - 14/19, 265 yards, 3 TD

**Top rushers**

- NE – Sony Michel - 20 carries, 57 yards
- MIA – Frank Gore - 12 carries, 92 yards

**Top receivers**

- NE – Rob Gronkowski - 8 receptions, 107 yards, TD
- MIA – Kenny Stills - 8 receptions, 135 yards, TD

==== Week 15: at Minnesota Vikings ====
Week Fifteen: Miami Dolphins at Minnesota Vikings – Game summary

Quarter	1	2	3	4	Total
Dolphins	0	10	7	0	**17**
**Vikings**	21	0	3	17	**41**

at U.S. Bank Stadium, Minneapolis, Minnesota

- Date: December 16
- Game time: 1:00 p.m. EST/12:00 p.m. CST
- Game weather: Played indoors (dome stadium)
- Game attendance: 66,841
- Referee: Walt Coleman
- TV announcers (CBS): Ian Eagle, Dan Fouts and Evan Washburn
- Recap, Gamebook

Game information

**First quarter**

- MIN – Stefon Diggs 13-yard pass from Kirk Cousins (Dan Bailey kick), 11:40. Vikings 7–0. **Drive: 6 plays, 76 yards, 3:20.**
- MIN – Dalvin Cook 13-yard run (Dan Bailey kick), 6:21. Vikings 14–0. **Drive: 6 plays, 60 yards, 2:59.**
- MIN – Latavius Murray 18-yard run (Dan Bailey kick), 1:32. Vikings 21–0. **Drive: 7 plays, 70 yards, 3:38.**

**Second quarter**

- MIA – Minkah Fitzpatrick 50-yard interception return (Jason Sanders kick), 7:44. Vikings 21–7.
- MIA – Jason Sanders 25-yard field goal, 0:14. Vikings 21–10. **Drive: 14 plays, 61 yards, 6:03.**

**Third quarter**

- MIA – Kalen Ballage 75-yard run (Jason Sanders kick), 14:49. Vikings 21–17. **Drive: 1 play, 75 yards, 0:11.**
- MIN – Dan Bailey 36-yard field goal, 8:40. Vikings 24–17. **Drive: 4 plays, 4 yards, 1:19.**

**Fourth quarter**

- MIN – Dan Bailey 34-yard field goal, 13:01. Vikings 27–17. **Drive: 9 plays, 57 yards, 4:35.**
- MIN – Aldrick Robinson 40-yard pass from Kirk Cousins (Dan Bailey kick), 9:54. Vikings 34–17. **Drive: 4 plays, 55 yards, 2:04.**
- MIN – Dalvin Cook 21-yard run (Dan Bailey kick), 7:49. Vikings 41–17. **Drive: 6 plays, 60 yards, 2:59.**

**Top passers**

- MIA – Ryan Tannehill – 11/24, 108 yards
- MIN – Kirk Cousins – 14/21, 215 yards, 2 TD, INT

**Top rushers**

- MIA – Kalen Ballage – 12 rushes, 123 yards, TD
- MIN – Dalvin Cook – 19 rushes, 136 yards, 2 TD

**Top receivers**

- MIA – Danny Amendola – 3 receptions, 30 yards
- MIN – Tyler Conklin – 2 receptions, 53 yards

This was the Dolphins' first loss to the Vikings since 2002.

==== Week 16: vs. Jacksonville Jaguars ====
Week Sixteen: Jacksonville Jaguars at Miami Dolphins – Game summary

Quarter	1	2	3	4	Total
**Jaguars**	7	0	0	10	**17**
Dolphins	7	0	0	0	**7**

at Hard Rock Stadium, Miami Gardens, Florida

- Date: December 23
- Game time: 1:00 p.m. EST
- Game weather: 73 °F (23 °C), sunny
- Game attendance: 65,798
- Referee: Clay Martin
- TV announcers (CBS): Andrew Catalon and James Lofton
- Recap, Gamebook

Game information

**First quarter**

- MIA – Brandon Bolden 4-yard pass from Ryan Tannehill (Jason Sanders kick), 9:49. Dolphins 7–0. **Drive: 8 plays, 78 yards, 5:11.**
- JAX – Leonard Fournette 1-yard run (Kai Forbath kick), 2:29. Tied 7–7. **Drive: 13 plays, 75 yards, 7:20.**

**Second quarter**

- No scoring plays.

**Third quarter**

- No scoring plays.

**Fourth quarter**

- JAX – Kai Forbath 26-yard field goal, 10:54. Jaguars 10–7. **Drive: 10 plays, 51 yards, 4:46.**
- JAX – Telvin Smith 33-yard interception return (Kai Forbath kick), 9:34. Jaguars 17–7.

**Top passers**

- JAX – Cody Kessler – 12/17, 106 yards
- MIA – Ryan Tannehill – 15/22, 146 yards, TD, INT

**Top rushers**

- JAX – Carlos Hyde – 8 carries, 47 yards
- MIA – Kenyan Drake – 6 carries, 23 yards

**Top receivers**

- JAX – Dede Westbrook – 7 receptions, 45 yards
- MIA – Kenyan Drake – 4 receptions, 31 yards

With the loss, the Dolphins were eliminated from playoff contention.

==== Week 17: at Buffalo Bills ====
Week Seventeen: Miami Dolphins at Buffalo Bills – Game summary

Quarter	1	2	3	4	Total
Dolphins	0	14	3	0	**17**
**Bills**	14	0	14	14	**42**

at New Era Field, Orchard Park, New York

- Date: December 30
- Game time: 1:00 p.m. EST
- Game weather: 33 °F (1 °C), cloudy
- Game attendance: 67,420
- Referee: John Hussey
- TV announcers (CBS): Beth Mowins and Steve Beuerlein
- Recap, Gamebook

Game information

**First quarter**

- BUF – Josh Allen 1-yard run (Stephen Hauschka kick), 10:14. Bills 7–0. **Drive: 9 plays, 66 yards, 4:46.**
- BUF – Zay Jones 18-yard pass from Josh Allen (Stephen Hauschka kick), 8:31. Bills 14–0. **Drive: 1 play, 18 yards, 0:07.**

**Second quarter**

- MIA – Ryan Tannehill 3-yard pass from Kenny Stills (Jason Sanders kick), 0:54. Bills 14–7. **Drive: 11 plays, 51 yards, 3:31.**
- MIA – Reshad Jones 29-yard interception return (Jason Sanders kick), 0:39. Tied 14–14.

**Third quarter**

- BUF – Robert Foster 5-yard pass from Josh Allen (Stephen Hauschka kick), 9:09. Bills 21–14. **Drive: 10 plays, 78 yards, 4:37.**
- BUF – LeSean McCoy 9-yard run (Stephen Hauschka), 6:57. Bills 28–14. **Drive: 5 plays, 23 yards, 1:48.**
- MIA – Jason Sanders 29-yard field goal, 1:28. Bills 28–17. **Drive: 11 plays, 55 yards, 5:29.**

**Fourth quarter**

- BUF – Josh Allen 30-yard run (Stephen Hauschka kick), 11:13. Bills 35–17. **Drive: 3 plays, 70 yards, 1:17.**
- BUF – Zay Jones 26-yard pass from Josh Allen (Stephen Hauschka kick), 7:44. Bills 42–17. **Drive: 2 plays, 52 yards, 0:25.**

**Top passers**

- MIA – Ryan Tannehill – 18/31, 147 yards, 2 INT
- BUF – Josh Allen – 17/26, 224 yards, 3 TD, INT

**Top rushers**

- MIA – Kalen Ballage – 12 carries, 27 yards
- BUF – Josh Allen – 9 carries, 95 yards, 2 TD

**Top receivers**

- MIA – Kenyan Drake – 5 receptions, 52 yards
- BUF – Zay Jones – 6 receptions, 93 yards, 2 TD

This season finale marked the final games of players such as quarterback Ryan Tannehill, linebacker Cameron Wake, and head coach Adam Gase all in Dolphins uniforms.

=== Standings ===
==== Division ====
AFC East
	W	L	T	PCT	DIV	CONF	PF	PA	STK
^{(2)} New England Patriots	11	5	0	.688	5–1	8–4	436	325	W2
Miami Dolphins	7	9	0	.438	4–2	6–6	319	433	L3
Buffalo Bills	6	10	0	.375	2–4	4–8	269	374	W1
New York Jets	4	12	0	.250	1–5	3–9	333	441	L3

==== Conference ====
AFC
#	Team	Division	W	L	T	PCT	DIV	CONF	SOS	SOV	STK
**Division leaders**
1 (Note: Kansas City finished ahead of LA Chargers in the AFC West based on division record, claiming the No. 1 seed.)	Kansas City Chiefs	West	12	4	0	.750	5–1	10–2	.480	.401	W1
2 (Note: New England claimed the No. 2 seed over Houston based on head-to-head victory.)	New England Patriots	East	11	5	0	.688	5–1	8–4	.482	.494	W2
3	Houston Texans	South	11	5	0	.688	4–2	9–3	.471	.435	W1
4	Baltimore Ravens	North	10	6	0	.625	3–3	8–4	.496	.450	W3
**Wild Cards**
5	Los Angeles Chargers	West	12	4	0	.750	4–2	9–3	.477	.422	W1
6	Indianapolis Colts	South	10	6	0	.625	4–2	7–5	.465	.456	W4
**Did not qualify for the postseason**
7	Pittsburgh Steelers	North	9	6	1	.594	4–1–1	6–5–1	.504	.448	W1
8	Tennessee Titans	South	9	7	0	.563	3–3	5–7	.520	.465	L1
9	Cleveland Browns	North	7	8	1	.469	3–2–1	5–6–1	.516	.411	L1
10	Miami Dolphins	East	7	9	0	.438	4–2	6–6	.469	.446	L3
11 (Note: Denver finished ahead of Cincinnati and Buffalo based on strength of victory. Cincinnati finished ahead of Buffalo based on record vs. common opponents. Cincinnati's cumulative record against Baltimore, Indianapolis, the Los Angeles Chargers and Miami was 3–2, compared to Buffalo's 1–4 cumulative record against the same four teams.)	Denver Broncos	West	6	10	0	.375	2–4	4–8	.523	.464	L4
12	Cincinnati Bengals	North	6	10	0	.375	1–5	4–8	.535	.448	L2
13	Buffalo Bills	East	6	10	0	.375	2–4	4–8	.523	.411	W1
14	Jacksonville Jaguars	South	5	11	0	.313	1–5	4–8	.549	.463	L1
15 (Note: NY Jets finished ahead of Oakland based on strength of victory.)	New York Jets	East	4	12	0	.250	1–5	3–9	.506	.438	L3
16	Oakland Raiders	West	4	12	0	.250	1–5	3–9	.547	.406	L1
**Tiebreakers** (Note: When breaking ties for three or more teams under the NFL's rules, they are first broken within divisions, then comparing only the highest ranked remaining team from each division.)
