= Laurence Hope =

Laurence or Larry Hope may refer to:

- Laurence Hope (artist) (born 1927), Australian artist
- Laurence Hope (poet) (1865–1904), English poet, pseudonym of Adela Florence Nicolson
- Larry Hope (defensive back), gridiron football cornerback
- Larry Hope, petitioner in the United States Supreme Court case Hope v. Pelzer
