= Belleville High School-West =

American high school in Illinois

Belleville Township High School-West

Location
- 4063 Frank Scott Parkway; Belleville, Illinois 62223; United States; 38.51915°N 90.03865°W

Information
- School type: Public secondary
- Motto: Maroon Way: Respectful Responsible and Kind
- Opened: 1916; 110 years ago
- School district: Belleville Township High School District 201
- Superintendent: Marshaun Warren
- Principal: Malcolm Hill
- Teaching staff: 127.20 (on an FTE basis)
- Grades: 9–12
- Enrollment: 2,169 (2023–24)
- Student to teacher ratio: 17.05
- Colors: Maroon, gray, and black
- Athletics conference: Southwestern Conference
- Nickname: Maroons
- Newspaper: Hy-News
- Yearbook: Bellevinois
- Website: bths201.org/belleville-west-home

Belleville Township High School West (also known as Belleville West) is a public comprehensive high school in Belleville, Illinois that is part of Belleville Township High School District 201.

== History ==
Originally, the Belleville Township High School District 201 operated only one school, Belleville Township High School, located at 2600 West Main Street. The growth of the district, however, prompted the Board of Education to construct a new campus and divide the student body between two schools. Thus, Belleville East High School was constructed, opening in the fall of 1966. The new campus was built in a college format with many different buildings. The newly commissioned Belleville Area College (now Southwestern Illinois College) occupied half of the campus while the new high school occupied the other. However, enrollment in the school increased rapidly and the college was forced to move to a new location. As the growth of the District continued, the need for a larger Belleville West Campus was realized. Therefore, in 2003, a new state of the art high school was built on 113 acres at the corner of Rt 15 and Frank Scott Parkway West.

== Athletics ==
The Maroons, as West teams are known, compete in the Southwestern Conference. The sports at West are divided into three separate seasons - held respectively during the Fall, Winter and Spring. Each season has its own individual and team sports which begin with a try-out session and an introductory night of activities and ends with an awards ceremony. A season lasts for approximately 3 months. The sports within a season are organized by teams, usually based on age and athletic ability, with the varsity designation as the highest level. Athletics at Belleville West are governed by the by-laws of the Illinois High School Association.

=== State titles ===
- Baseball:1940, 1947, 1949, 1954
- Boys' Basketball: 2018, 2019
- Boys' Golf: 1968, 1970, 1972
- Girls' Track and Field: 2009
- Girls' Volleyball: 1991, 1992

== Activities ==
Little Theatre is an organization that promotes theatrical events on the Belleville West campus. The group sponsors monthly informational meetings, social events, and a spring honors reception. The theater always puts on a total of five plays per year. These include a fall play, a children's play, a musical, and contest play in the second semester. There is an evening of one-acts every year as well for freshmen and sophomores.

The Belleville West Hy News has been reporting the news of Belleville Township High School and then Belleville West High School for over 80 years. This student publication is a co-curricular activity, produced by its 38-member staff, which includes freshmen through seniors.

== Notable alumni ==
- Jenny Bindon, professional soccer player, goalkeeper for New Zealand during the 2008 Olympics and 2012 Olympics
- Brian Daubach, former MLB player (Florida Marlins, Boston Red Sox, Chicago White Sox, New York Mets)
- Lea DeLaria, actor, comedian, jazz musician and singer
- Neal Doughty, musician, member of REO Speedwagon
- Jay Farrar, musician, member of Uncle Tupelo and Son Volt
- Bob Goalby, professional golfer, winner of the 1968 Masters Tournament
- Jay Haas, professional golfer, NCAA golf champion at Wake Forest University
- Brian Hill, professional football player, formerly with the St. Louis Battlehawks
- E. J. Liddell, professional basketball player for Chicago Bulls, played collegiately for the Ohio State Buckeyes, Two-time Illinois Mr. Basketball
- Rusty Lisch, NFL quarterback
- Sandra Magnus, NASA astronaut
- Jerry Moore, former NFL player (Chicago Bears, New Orleans Saints)
- Les Mueller, former MLB player (Detroit Tigers)
- Keith Randolph Jr., American football player and current free agent, formerly for the Chicago Bears, played college football for the Illinois Fighting Illini
- David Rasche, actor
- Seth Rudolph, professional soccer player
- Austin Seibert, current kicker for the Washington Commanders, former Oklahoma Sooner, set record for most points all time by a kicker in FBS history
- Jeff Tweedy, musician, member of Uncle Tupelo and Wilco
- Bud Zipfel, former MLB player (Washington Senators)
- Nick Hankins Jr., American football player plays college football for the Illinois Fighting Illini
