= Belleville Township High School District 201 =

School district in Illinois, United States

Address
- 920 N. Illinois St. Belleville, St. Clair County, Illinois; United States

District information
- Schools: 4

Students and staff
- Students: 4753
- Teachers: 288.60 FTE
- Student–teacher ratio: 16.47

Other information
- Website: https://bths201.org/

Belleville Township High School District 201 (BTHS District 201 or Belleville 201) is a school district in Illinois, headquartered in Belleville.

It is within St. Clair County. The district includes the majority of Belleville, Millstadt, Swansea, most of Fairview Heights, and the western half of Shiloh.

It operates two high schools, Belleville East High School and Belleville West High School, along with the Center for Academic and Vocational Excellence (CAVE).

The district has the Bridges Connections Campus, which includes the childhood residence and former property of Bob Goalby. In 2023, CAVE students built a building on the Goalby property.

== History ==
Jeff Dosier was superintendent until his 2020 retirement. Brian Mentzer was scheduled to replace Dosier.

In the aftermath of the COVID-19 pandemic in Illinois, the district received Elementary and Secondary School Emergency Relief Fund (ESSER) funds. The district used the money to get objects to protect staff and students from COVID as well as the funds to hire more employees and technological equipment.
