= William Hayes (American football) =

American football player (born 1985)

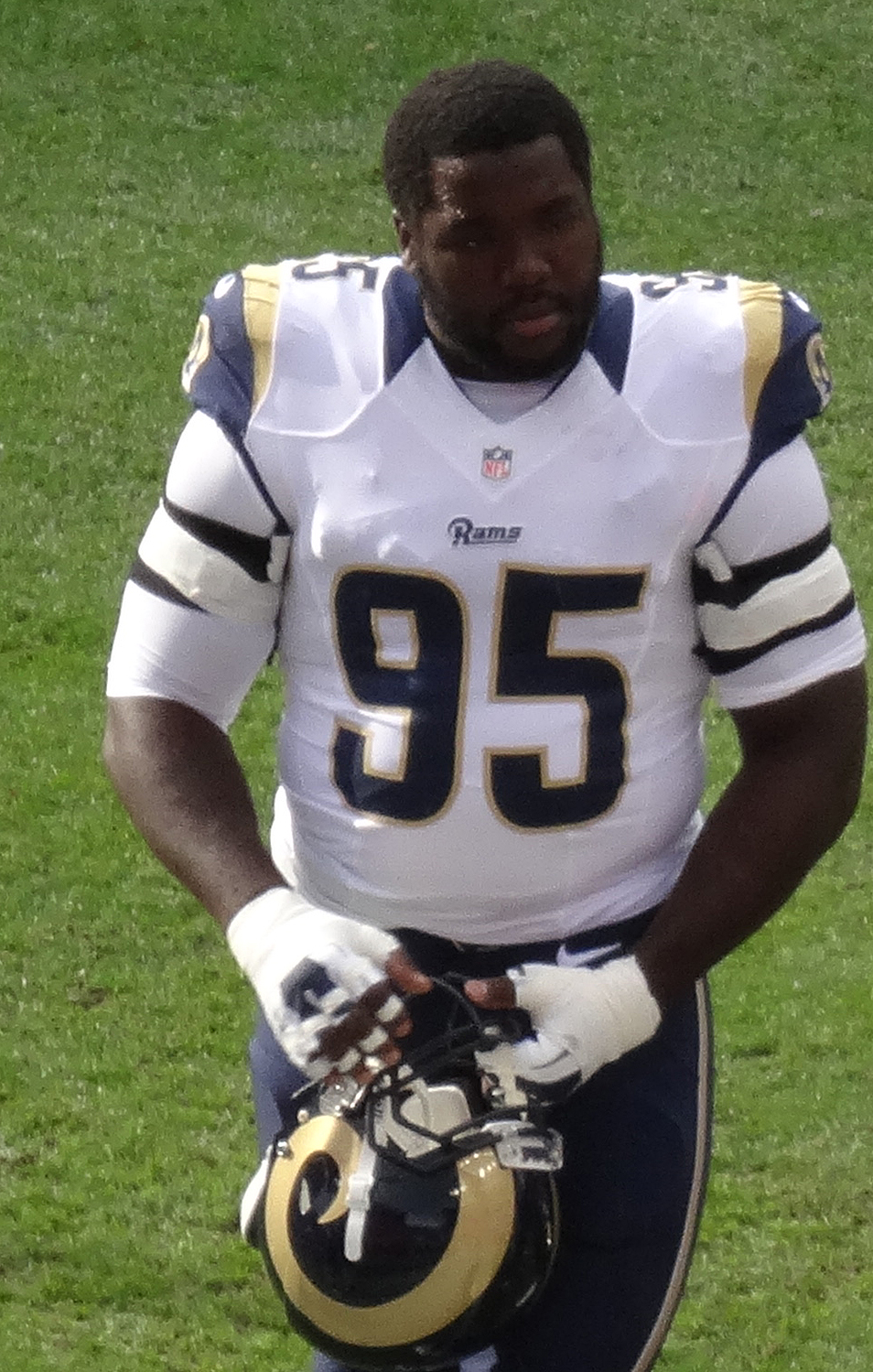
- Hayes with the St. Louis Rams in 2013

No. 95
- Position: Defensive end

Personal information
- Born: May 2, 1985 (age 41); High Point, North Carolina, U.S.
- Listed height: 6 ft 3 in (1.91 m)
- Listed weight: 265 lb (120 kg)

Career information
- High school: T.W. Andrews (High Point)
- College: Winston-Salem State (2003–2007)
- NFL draft: 2008: 4th round, 103rd overall pick

Career history
- Tennessee Titans (2008–2011); St. Louis / Los Angeles Rams (2012–2016); Miami Dolphins (2017–2018)

Career NFL statistics
- Total tackles: 337
- Sacks: 37.5
- Forced fumbles: 7
- Fumble recoveries: 5
- Interceptions: 1
- Stats at Pro Football Reference

William Quintin Hayes (born May 2, 1985) is an American former professional football player who was a defensive end in the National Football League (NFL). He was selected by the Tennessee Titans in the fourth round of the 2008 NFL draft. He played college football for the Winston-Salem State Rams.

== Early life ==
A native of High Point, North Carolina, Hayes is a 2003 graduate of T. Wingate Andrews High School where he was a member of the Raiders' Mid State 2A Conference Championship football team in 2003.

== College career ==
=== 2003 season ===
He redshirted in his first season at Winston-Salem State. Before he attended Winston-Salem State, he was also redshirted at Barber–Scotia College before the school lost accreditation.

=== 2004 season ===
In 2004, he appeared in five games for the Rams, starting in two, making eight total tackles. He tallied three solo tackles and five assisted tackles. He recorded one tackle for a loss of one yard and broke up one pass.

=== 2005 season ===
In 2005, he appeared in three games for the Rams, starting two making seven total tackles with four tackles for a loss of five total yards.

=== 2006 season ===
In 2006, he became one of the team's top defensive players, playing in all 11 games with nine starts after he appeared in all 11 games last season and made 57 tackles with (25 solo), leading the team in sacks with 6.5 yards and total tackles for a loss with 13 for a loss. He even added an interception and also added four pass breakups along with two quarterback hurries and two fumble recoveries.

=== 2007 season ===
In 2007, he appeared in 11 games for the Rams with 11 starts and recorded 78 tackles, tallied 46 solo tackles and 32 assisted tackles with 19 tackles for loss, and a team-high 8.5 sacks. He also forced a team-high seven fumbles and recovered four fumbles, one of which he returned six yards for a touchdown versus Delaware State University, one of his two touchdowns on the season he recovered another fumble in the Rams' last game of the season and returned it 16 yards for a go-ahead touchdown. He hurried opposing quarterbacks 12 times and broke up three passes on the season.

== Professional career ==
=== Pre-draft ===
Hayes helped his draft stock considerably when he was clocked at 4.59 in the 40-yard dash at his pro day at Wake Forest University in March 2008.

=== Tennessee Titans ===
Hayes was selected by the Titans in the fourth round of the 2008 NFL draft. He signed a minimum salary contract over the next four years and a $500,000 signing bonus totaling $1.8 million. In his rookie season he made 13 tackles and one sack as a reserve defensive end for the Titans. Once Jeff Fisher benched veteran starter Jevon Kearse in Week 10, Hayes became the starter.

=== St. Louis/Los Angeles Rams ===
Hayes signed a one-year, $900,000 contract with the St. Louis Rams on April 6, 2012. Hayes played backup defensive end and also played defensive tackle in Rams nickel defense in 2012 and was third on team with 7 sacks.

On March 12, 2013, he signed a three-year, $10.5 million contract extension that includes $5.75 million in guarantees. On March 9, 2016, Hayes re-signed with the Rams to a three-year $21 million contract.

=== Miami Dolphins ===
On March 9, 2017, Hayes was traded to the Miami Dolphins along with a seventh round draft pick in the 2017 NFL draft for Miami's sixth round selection in the draft. He was placed on injured reserve on November 28, 2017, with a back injury.

On March 14, 2018, Hayes signed a one-year contract extension with the Dolphins.

In Week 3 of the 2018 season, Hayes suffered a torn ACL while sacking Raiders' quarterback Derek Carr, and was ruled out for the season.

== NFL career statistics ==
Legend
**Bold**	Career high

=== Regular season ===
Year	Team	Games		Tackles					Interceptions					Fumbles			
Year	Team	GP	GS	Cmb	Solo	Ast	Sck	TFL	Int	Yds	TD	Lng	PD	FF	FR	Yds	TD
2008	TEN	8	0	14	11	3	1.0	1	0	0	0	0	1	1	1	4	0
2009	TEN	**16**	11	51	31	**20**	4.0	9	0	0	0	0	0	**2**	0	0	0
2010	TEN	14	0	32	25	7	1.5	3	0	0	0	0	0	1	0	0	0
2011	TEN	10	1	16	11	5	1.5	4	0	0	0	0	0	0	0	0	0
2012	STL	**16**	0	35	29	6	**7.0**	**12**	0	0	0	0	2	0	1	0	0
2013	STL	14	0	28	21	7	5.0	9	**1**	**5**	0	**5**	**3**	0	**2**	0	0
2014	STL	**16**	9	42	33	9	4.0	11	0	0	0	0	0	1	1	**6**	0
2015	STL	**16**	11	**53**	**36**	17	5.5	**12**	0	0	0	0	0	**2**	0	0	0
2016	LAR	14	**14**	43	31	12	5.0	10	0	0	0	0	0	0	0	0	0
2017	MIA	10	0	19	14	5	1.0	4	0	0	0	0	0	0	0	0	0
2018	MIA	3	0	4	4	0	2.0	3	0	0	0	0	0	0	0	0	0
		137	46	337	246	91	37.5	78	1	5	0	5	6	7	5	10	0

=== Playoffs ===
Year	Team	Games		Tackles					Interceptions					Fumbles			
Year	Team	GP	GS	Cmb	Solo	Ast	Sck	TFL	Int	Yds	TD	Lng	PD	FF	FR	Yds	TD
2008	TEN	**1**	0	0	0	0	0.0	0	0	0	0	0	0	0	0	0	0
		1	0	0	0	0	0.0	0	0	0	0	0	0	0	0	0	0

== Mermaids and dinosaurs ==
In December 2015, Hayes received media attention for his disbelief in dinosaurs. He claimed, "No, I don't believe dinosaurs existed. Not even a little bit." He continued, stating "I believe there is more of a chance you will find a mermaid than you will a dinosaur because we find different species in the water all the time." According to his former teammate and friend Chris Long, "He thinks archaeologists place bones underground like a parent would place Easter eggs. They just planted them. It's some large conspiracy. He does not believe that dinosaurs ever existed and he thinks that mermaids are real. I love dinosaurs, so we have a big point of contention."

In a 2016 segment on HBO's Hard Knocks, it was revealed that Hayes is a firm believer in mermaids. According to head coach Jeff Fisher, "I remember him getting really excited about the potential for moving out here [from St. Louis to Los Angeles] because he knew he would be closer to mermaids here on the West Coast."

On an episode of Jimmy Kimmel Live! in November 2016, Hayes toured the Dinosaur Hall at the Natural History Museum of Los Angeles County with Kimmel and a paleontologist, Daniel Caballero. He claimed that all of the skeletons and fossils were fake and had been planted by people in order to allow for the supposed discovery of the fossils by paleontologists. This visit further solidified his denial of the existence of dinosaurs. However, the visit reinforced his belief in the existence of mermaids after a short discussion about the potential for the future discovery of the species. He also briefly discussed his belief of unicorns in the episode.
