= Belleville High School-East =

Belleville High School East

Location
- 2555 West Boulevard; Belleville, Illinois; United States; 38°31′07″N 89°57′00″W

Information
- Type: Public
- Established: 1966
- School district: Belleville Township High School District 201
- Principal: Joe Rujawitz
- Teaching staff: 152.40 (on FTE basis)
- Grades: 9-12
- Enrollment: 2,564 (2023-2024)
- Student to teacher ratio: 16.96
- Colors: Columbia blue and navy
- Athletics conference: Southwestern Conference
- Mascot: Lancers
- Website: bths201.org/belleville-east-home/

Belleville High School East is a public high school in Belleville, Illinois, United States. It is part of Belleville Township High School District 201. It was established in 1966.

== History ==
Prior to 1966, Belleville Township School District operated only one school, Belleville Township High School, which was the old Belleville West campus (a new campus has since been built). The growth of the district prompted the local board of education to construct a new campus and divide the student body between the two schools.

The new campus was built in a college format with many different buildings. The newly commissioned Belleville Area College (now Southwestern Illinois College) occupied half of the campus while the new high school occupied the other. Enrollment in the school increased rapidly and the college was forced to move to a new location.

Major renovations were completed in 2009. These included new landscaping, more classrooms, remodeled classrooms and buildings, new lockers, and a new cafeteria.

As of the 2023-2024 school year, it is the largest public high school in the St Louis region.

== Notable alumni ==
- Chase Allen, football player, Linebacker for Southern Illinois University Carbondale, Undrafted free agent with Miami Dolphins in May 2017, 2017 starter for Miami Dolphins
- Malcolm Hill, ESPN ranked #72 basketball player in Class of 2013, starter at University of Illinois, Israel Basketball Premier League, Chicago Bulls 2021-2022
- Gary Leonard, former NBA player
- Zander Mueth, professional baseball player
- Matt Russell, All-American college football player, pro player and sports administrator
- Rob Strano, former touring professional golfer; PGA Tour; Nike/Buy.Com/Nationwide Tour; Golf Channel Academy; golf instructor
- Randy Wells, former MLB pitcher (Chicago Cubs)

=== Wall of Fame ===
The school established a "Lancer Wall of Fame" to recognize noteworthy alumni, faculty, support staff and community members.

==== Class of 2004 ====
- Mark Hollmann, Tony Award-winning songwriter
- Matt Russell

==== Class of 2006 ====
- Alumnus Paul Gompers, Ph.D., Harvard Professor/Marathon Record Setter/entrepreneur, Class of 1982

==== Class of 2010 ====
- Nathan Hodel, NFL Player/Hodel Foundation, Class of 1996
- Mark Kern, Public Servant, Class of 1981

==== Class of 2012 ====
- Alumnus (1978 graduate) Lt. Col. David P. Cooley

==== Class of 2018 ====
- Dr. Bob Farmer, 1987 East graduate
