= Chase Allen (linebacker) =

American football player (born 1993)

Profile
- Position: Linebacker

Personal information
- Born: August 29, 1993 (age 33); Belleville, Illinois, U.S.
- Listed height: 6 ft 3 in (1.91 m)
- Listed weight: 246 lb (112 kg)

Career information
- High school: Belleville East
- College: Southern Illinois
- NFL draft: 2017: undrafted

Career history
- Miami Dolphins (2017–2019)

Awards and highlights
- Second-team All-MVFC (2016)

Career NFL statistics
- Total tackles: 43
- Forced fumbles: 1
- Stats at Pro Football Reference

Chase Allen (born August 29, 1993) is an American former professional football player who was a linebacker in the National Football League (NFL). He played college football for the Southern Illinois Salukis.

== High school ==
Attended Belleville East High School in Belleville, Illinois. Allen was a First-team All-Conference selection and committed to Southern Illinois University Carbondale in 2012.

== College career ==
Allen played in 35 games for the Salukis, he played at outside and middle linebacker and was a Second-team All-MVFC selection. He was the captain of the Salukis and known as the "Man in the Middle" as he had the heaviest bench press in the history of Salukis football.

== Professional career ==
Pre-draft measurables
Height	Weight	Arm length	Hand span	Wingspan	40-yard dash	10-yard split	20-yard split	20-yard shuttle	Three-cone drill	Vertical jump	Broad jump	Bench press
6 ft 3 1/8 in (1.91 m)	241 lb (109 kg)	30 7/8 in (0.78 m)	9 7/8 in (0.25 m)	6 ft 5 1/8 in (1.96 m)	4.60 s	1.65 s	2.70 s	4.19 s	6.88 s	33.0 in (0.84 m)	9 ft 8 in (2.95 m)	23 reps
All values from Pro Day

Allen signed with the Miami Dolphins as an undrafted free agent on May 5, 2017. He played in all 16 games as a rookie, starting 10, finishing with 40 tackles.

On October 17, 2018, Allen was placed on injured reserve with a foot injury.

On August 27, 2019, Allen was waived/injured by the Dolphins and placed on injured reserve.

== Personal life ==
Allen is the son of Tammy and Chris Allen.
