= Maurice Smith (cornerback) =

American football player (born 1995)

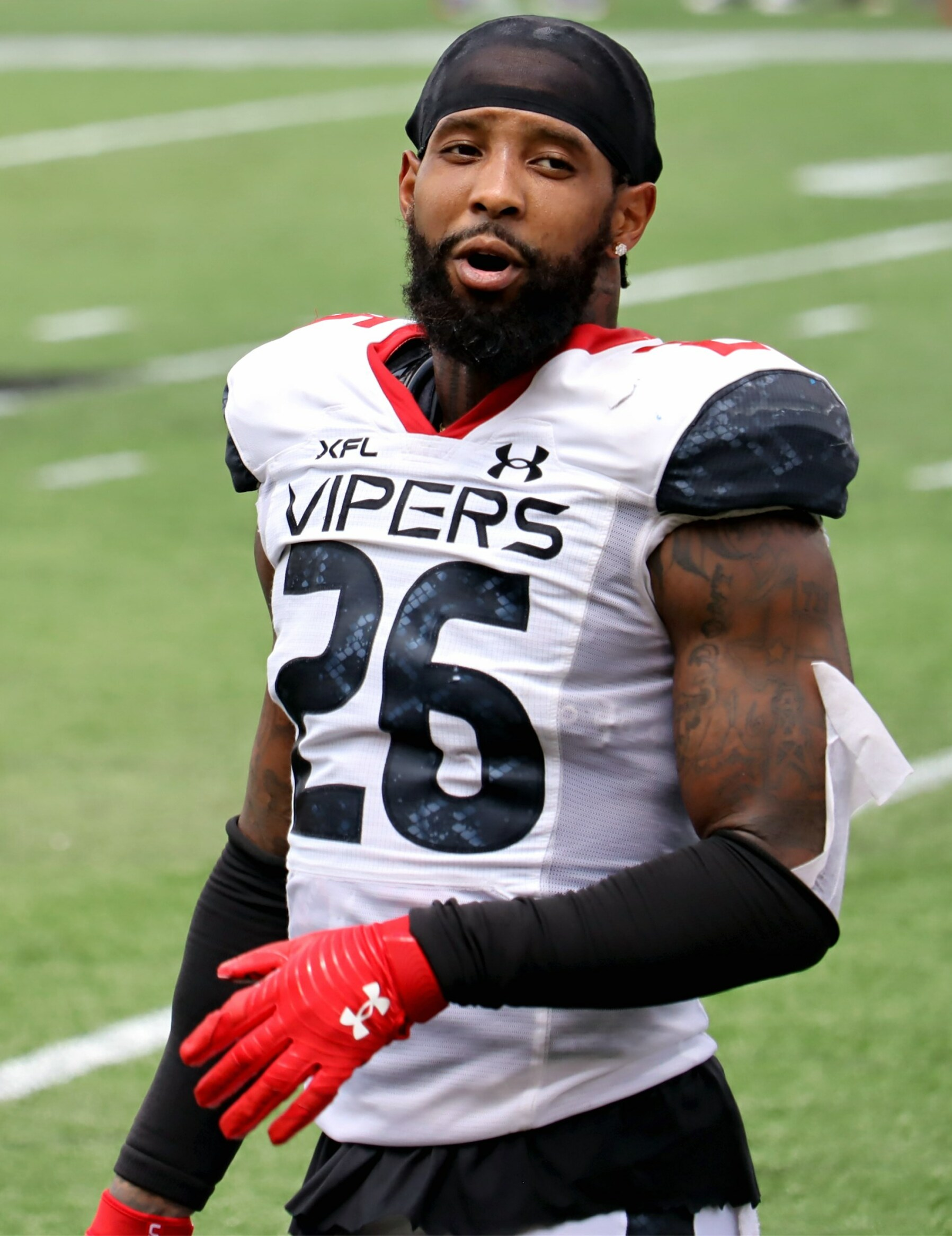
- Smith with the Vegas Vipers in 2023

No. 27, 26, 46
- Position: Safety

Personal information
- Born: June 14, 1995 (age 31); Phoenix, Arizona, U.S.
- Listed height: 6 ft 0 in (1.83 m)
- Listed weight: 194 lb (88 kg)

Career information
- High school: Dulles (Sugar Land, Texas)
- College: Alabama (2013–2015); Georgia (2016)
- NFL draft: 2017: undrafted

Career history
- Miami Dolphins (2017–2018); Washington Redskins (2019); Cincinnati Bengals (2020)*; Tennessee Titans (2020); Vegas Vipers (2023)
- * Offseason or practice squad member only

Career NFL statistics
- Total tackles: 7
- Pass deflections: 2
- Stats at Pro Football Reference

Maurice Bernard Smith (born June 14, 1995) is an American former professional football player who was a safety in the National Football League (NFL). He played college football for the Alabama Crimson Tide and Georgia.

== Early life ==
Smith attended John Foster Dulles High School in Sugar Land, Texas. He would play on the school's football team. He was a consensus four-star cornerback, he played in the Under Armour All-American Game, and was ranked as the No. 5 cornerback in the class of 2013. Smith committed to Alabama over offers from Arkansas, Florida, LSU, Nebraska, Ohio State, Texas, Texas A&M, and Utah, among others.

== College career ==
Smith played for Alabama from 2013 to 2015 and transferred to Georgia in 2016 as a graduate transfer. In his only season as a Bulldog, he was named team captain. He finished the season with 50 total tackles, three passes defended, two interceptions and two forced fumbles.

== Professional career ==
Pre-draft measurables
Height	Weight	Arm length	Hand span	40-yard dash	10-yard split	20-yard split	20-yard shuttle	Three-cone drill	Vertical jump	Broad jump	Bench press
5 ft 11 7/8 in (1.83 m)	194 lb (88 kg)	30 5/8 in (0.78 m)	8 3/4 in (0.22 m)	4.63 s	1.57 s	2.69 s	4.20 s	6.94 s	31.5 in (0.80 m)	9 ft 7 in (2.92 m)	16 reps
All values from Pro Day

=== Miami Dolphins ===
Smith signed with the Miami Dolphins as an undrafted free agent on May 5, 2017. He was placed on the reserve/non-football illness list on December 2, 2017.

On September 3, 2018, Smith was waived by the Dolphins and was re-signed to the practice squad. He was promoted to the active roster on September 18, 2018. He was waived again on October 29, 2018, and re-signed to the practice squad. He was promoted back to the active roster on December 21, 2018.

On August 31, 2019, Smith was waived by the Dolphins.

=== Washington Redskins ===
On October 14, 2019, Smith was signed to the Washington Redskins practice squad. He was promoted to the active roster on December 18, 2019. He was waived on August 3, 2020.

=== Cincinnati Bengals ===
Smith had a tryout with the Cincinnati Bengals on August 23, 2020. He signed with the team three days later. He was waived on September 5, 2020.

=== Tennessee Titans ===
Smith was signed to the Tennessee Titans practice squad on September 17, 2020, but was released four days later. On September 29, 2020, Smith was re-signed to the practice squad. He was released on October 20, 2020. On February 1, 2021, Smith signed a reserve/futures contract with the Titans. On August 16, 2021, Smith was waived/injured by the Titans and placed on injured reserve. He was released on August 25.

=== Vegas Vipers ===
Smith was a draft selection by the Vegas Vipers in the 2023 XFL draft. He was placed on the reserve list by the team on February 16, 2023. He was activated on March 15. The Vipers folded when the XFL and USFL merged to create the United Football League (UFL). ….

== Personal life ==
Smith is the older brother of NFL running back and wide receiver Ainias Smith, who currently plays for the Philadelphia Eagles.
