= Larry Hope (defensive back) =

American football player (born 1993)

Profile
- Position: Cornerback

Personal information
- Born: October 19, 1993 (age 33); Miami, Florida, U.S.
- Listed height: 6 ft 0 in (1.83 m)
- Listed weight: 190 lb (86 kg)

Career information
- College: Akron
- NFL draft: 2017: undrafted

Career history
- Miami Dolphins (2017)*; Montreal Alouettes (2018)*
- * Offseason or practice squad member only
- Stats at CFL.ca

Larry Hope (born October 19, 1993) is a gridiron football cornerback. He played college football at Akron.

== High school ==
Hope was a three-star recruit according to Rivals.com, ESPN and Scout.com. He was rated as No. 59 cornerback prospect according to ESPN, and chose to attend Miami over Schools such as Nebraska and Wisconsin and more.

== College career ==
As a redshirt freshman in 2013, Hope saw action in five games, primarily on special teams and as reserve defensive back. After the 2013 season, Hope decided to transfer from Miami. He decided to go to Akron and had to sat the 2014 season due to NCAA transfer rules.

== Professional career ==
Hope signed with the Miami Dolphins as an undrafted free agent on May 5, 2017.
