= Malcolm Lewis =

American gridiron football player (born 1993)

Profile
- Position: Wide receiver

Personal information
- Born: October 27, 1993 (age 33); Miramar, Florida, U.S.
- Listed height: 5 ft 10 in (1.78 m)
- Listed weight: 190 lb (86 kg)

Career information
- High school: Miramar
- College: Miami (FL)
- NFL draft: 2017: undrafted

Career history
- Miami Dolphins (2017–2018)*; Winnipeg Blue Bombers (2020–2021)*
- * Offseason or practice squad member only
- Stats at Pro Football Reference

Malcolm Lewis (born October 27, 1993) is an American former professional football wide receiver. He played college football at the University of Miami.

== Early life ==
Four-star recruit according to Rivals.com and ESPN, No.18 wide receiver prospect and No. 29 overall recruit in Florida according to ESPN. Choose Miami over Florida State.

== College career ==
Lewis was a reserve wide receiver during his time at Miami. At Miami's Pro Day, Lewis ran a 4.44s 40-yard dash.

== Professional career ==
=== Miami Dolphins ===
Lewis signed with the Miami Dolphins as an undrafted free agent on May 5, 2017. He was waived on September 2, 2017 and was signed to the practice squad the next day. He signed a reserve/future contract with the Dolphins on January 1, 2018.

On September 1, 2018, Lewis was waived by the Dolphins. On October 11, Lewis was signed by the Dolphins to their practice squad.

=== Winnipeg Blue Bombers ===
Lewis signed a futures contract with the Winnipeg Blue Bombers of the Canadian Football League (CFL) on November 1, 2019. After the CFL canceled the 2020 season due to the COVID-19 pandemic, Lewis chose to opt-out of his contract with the Blue Bombers on August 26, 2020. He opted back in to his contract on January 15, 2021. He was placed on the suspended list on July 9, 2021.
