= 2010 Dallas Cowboys season =

51st season in franchise history

- Owner: Jerry Jones
- General manager: Jerry Jones
- Head coach: Wade Phillips (fired November 8, 1–7 record); Jason Garrett (interim, 5–3 record)
- Home stadium: Cowboys Stadium

Results
- Record: 6–10
- Division place: 3rd NFC East
- Playoffs: Did not qualify
- All-Pros: TE Jason Witten (1st team); P Mat McBriar (2nd team); LB DeMarcus Ware (2nd team)
- Pro Bowlers: WR Miles Austin; C Andre Gurode; P Mat McBriar; DT Jay Ratliff; LB DeMarcus Ware; TE Jason Witten

Uniform
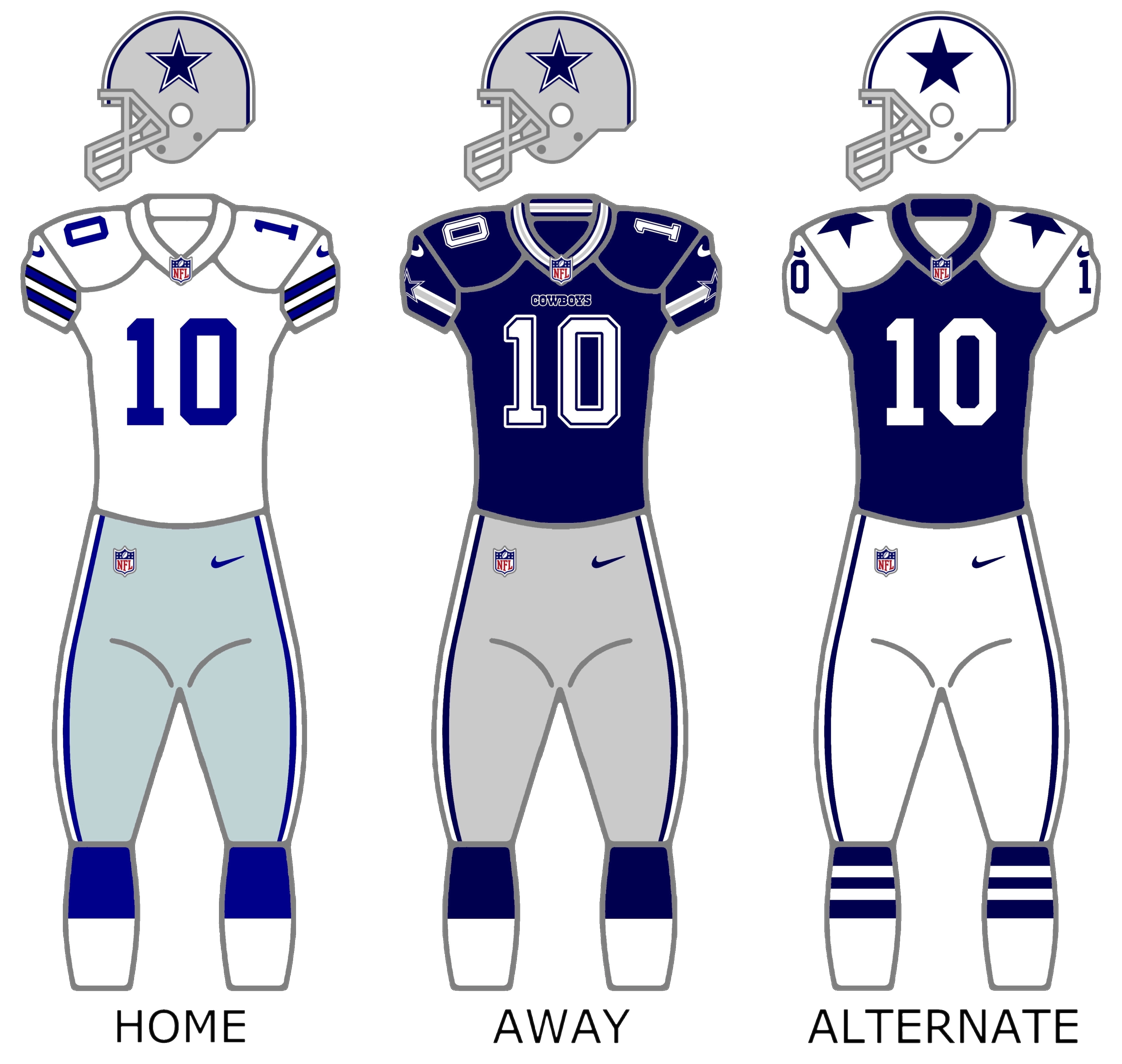

The 2010 season was the Dallas Cowboys' 51st in the National Football League (NFL), their second playing home games at Cowboys Stadium and fourth and final under head coach Wade Phillips. After falling to the Minnesota Vikings in the divisional round of the 2009–10 NFL playoffs, the Cowboys sought to defend their NFC East division title and contend for a Super Bowl title, particularly given that Super Bowl XLV would be played at Cowboys Stadium.

However, this did not happen and after a 1–7 start Wade Phillips became the first coach in Cowboys history to be fired during the season. He was replaced by assistant head coach and offensive coordinator Jason Garrett. The Cowboys finished the season 6–10, 3rd place in the NFC East, and failed to reach the playoffs. This was the Cowboys' first losing season since 2004. However, under Garrett the team's record was 5–3 as compared to the 1–7 start under Phillips.

== Offseason ==
=== Free agents ===
RFA: Restricted free-agent, UFA: Unrestricted free-agent, ERFA: Exclusive rights free agent

Position	Player	Free agency tag	Date signed	2010 team
OT	Flozell Adams	Released	July 29, 2010	Pittsburgh Steelers
WR	Miles Austin	RFA	June 11, 2010	Dallas Cowboys
CB/FS	Alan Ball	ERFA	April 27, 2010	Dallas Cowboys
DE	Stephen Bowen	RFA	April 9, 2010	Dallas Cowboys
CB	Cletis Gordon	RFA	March 4, 2010	Dallas Cowboys
FS	Ken Hamlin	Released	June 17, 2010	Baltimore Ravens
DE	Jason Hatcher	RFA	April 8, 2010	Dallas Cowboys
G	Montrae Holland	UFA	April 27, 2010	Dallas Cowboys
WR	Sam Hurd	RFA	April 16, 2010	Dallas Cowboys
OT	Pat McQuistan	RFA	April 7, 2010	Dallas Cowboys
OLB	Steve Octavien	ERFA	April 6, 2010	Dallas Cowboys
C/G	Cory Procter	RFA	March 26, 2010	Dallas Cowboys
SS	Gerald Sensabaugh	RFA	May 27, 2010	Dallas Cowboys
NT	Junior Siavii	RFA	April 8, 2010	Dallas Cowboys
DE	Marcus Spears	RFA	April 6, 2010	Dallas Cowboys
K	Shaun Suisham	RFA	November 16, 2010	Pittsburgh Steelers
SS	Pat Watkins	RFA	April 15, 2010	Dallas Cowboys

=== 2010 draft class ===
2010 Dallas Cowboys draft
Round	Pick	Player	Position	College	Notes
1	24	Dez Bryant *	Wide receiver	Oklahoma State	from Philadelphia via Denver and New England
2	55	Sean Lee *	Linebacker	Penn State	from Philadelphia
4	126	Akwasi Owusu-Ansah	Free safety	IUP	from San Diego via Miami
6	179	Sam Young	Offensive tackle	Notre Dame	from Miami
6	196	Jamar Wall	Cornerback	Texas Tech	
7	234	Sean Lissemore	Defensive end	William & Mary	
Made roster * Made at least one Pro Bowl during career

Notes

- The Cowboys traded their original first (#27) and third-round (#90) selections for the New England Patriots first (#24) and fourth-round (#119) selections.
- The Cowboys traded their original second (#59) and fourth-round (#125) selection to the Philadelphia Eagles in exchange for a second-round (#55) selection.
- The Cowboys traded their fourth-round (#119 acquired from New England) selection to the Miami Dolphins in exchange for fourth (#126) and sixth-round (#179) selections.
- The Cowboys traded their original fifth-round (#158) selection to the Denver Broncos in exchange for guard Montrae Holland.

=== Undrafted free agents ===
Name	Position	College
Dalbert Alvarado	Punter/Kicker	South Florida
Junior Aumavae	Defensive tackle	Minnesota State
Will Barker	Tackle	Virginia
Barry Church	Safety	Toledo
Phil Costa	Center	Maryland
Chris Gronkowski	Fullback	Arizona
Terrell Hudgins	Wide receiver	Elon
Bryan McCann	Cornerback	SMU
Danny McCray	Safety	LSU
Lonyae Miller	Running back	Fresno State
Matt Nichols	Quarterback	Eastern Washington
Scott Sicko	Tight end	New Hampshire
Mike Tepper	Tackle	California
Verran Tucker	Wide receiver	California
Lorenzo Washington	Defensive end	Alabama

== Personnel ==
=== Staff / Coaches ===
2010 Dallas Cowboys staff
Front office: Owner/president/general manager – Jerry Jones; COO/executive vice president/director of player personnel – Stephen Jones; Director of college scouting – Tom Ciskowski; Director of pro scouting – Judd Garrett; Director of player administration – Todd Williams; Head coaches: Head coach/defensive coordinator – Wade Phillips (fired Nov 8, 2010); Interim head coach/offensive coordinator – Jason Garrett; Offensive coaches: Quarterbacks – Wade Wilson; Running backs – Skip Peete; Wide receivers – Ray Sherman; Tight ends – John Garrett; Offensive line – Hudson Houck; Quality control/offensive assistant – Wes Phillips; Quality control/offensive assistant – Keith O'Quinn	Defensive coaches: Interim defensive coordinator/defensive line – Paul Pasqualoni; Linebackers – Reggie Herring; Secondary – Dave Campo; Secondary (safeties) – Brett Maxie; Defensive quality control/assistant linebackers – Bobby King; Special teams coaches: Special teams coordinator – Joe DeCamillis; Assistant special teams coach - Chris Boniol; Strength and conditioning: Strength and conditioning – Joe Juraszek; Assistant strength and conditioning – Todd Devers; Assistant strength and conditioning – Tony Ollison

=== Rosters ===
==== Opening training camp roster ====
Dallas Cowboys 2010 opening training camp roster
Quarterbacks: 3 Jon Kitna; 7 Stephen McGee; 10 Matt Nichols; 9 Tony Romo; Running backs: 34 Deon Anderson FB; 24 Marion Barber III; 23 Tashard Choice; 31 Herb Donaldson; 44 Chris Gronkowski FB; 28 Felix Jones; 35 Lonyae Miller; Wide receivers: 19 Miles Austin; 88 Dez Bryant; 84 Patrick Crayton; 16 Jesse Holley; 14 Terrell Hudgins; 17 Sam Hurd; 15 Manuel Johnson; 85 Kevin Ogletree; 83 Titus Ryan; 11 Roy Williams; Tight ends: 48 Kevin Brock; 89 John Phillips; 86 Scott Sicko; 82 Jason Witten	Offensive linemen: 73 Will Barker T; 71 Alex Barron T; 79 Robert Brewster T; 60 Travis Bright C/G; 75 Marc Colombo T; 67 Phil Costa C/G; 70 Leonard Davis G; 68 Doug Free T; 65 Andre Gurode C; 64 Montrae Holland G; 63 Kyle Kosier G/C; 77 Pat McQuistan G/T; 62 Mike Tepper G/T; 76 Sam Young T; Defensive linemen: 72 Stephen Bowen DE; 78 Josh Brent NT; 92 Marcus Dixon DE; 97 Jason Hatcher DE; 69 Sean Lissemore DE/NT; 99 Igor Olshansky DE; 90 Jay Ratliff NT; 95 Junior Siavii NT; 96 Marcus Spears DE	Linebackers: 51 Keith Brooking ILB; 57 Victor Butler OLB/DE; 56 Bradie James ILB; 98 Curtis Johnson OLB/DE; 50 Sean Lee ILB; 53 Steve Octavien OLB/ILB; 54 Brandon Sharpe ILB/OLB; 93 Anthony Spencer OLB/DE; 94 DeMarcus Ware OLB/DE; 59 Brandon Williams OLB/DE; 58 Jason Williams ILB; 52 Leon Williams ILB; Defensive backs: 20 Alan Ball FS/CB; 42 Barry Church SS; 26 Cletis Gordon CB; 36 Michael Hamlin FS; 21 Mike Jenkins CB; 37 Bryan McCann CB; 40 Danny McCray FS; 41 Terence Newman CB; 32 Orlando Scandrick CB; 43 Gerald Sensabaugh SS; 30 Jamar Wall CB; 25 Pat Watkins SS; Special teams: 4 Delbert Alvarado P/K; 18 David Buehler K; 91 L. P. Ladouceur LS; 1 Mat McBriar P	Reserve lists: 80 Martellus Bennett TE (Active/NF-Inj.); 55 Stephen Hodge ILB (Active/PUP); 27 Akwasi Owusu-Ansah FS (Active/NF-Inj.); 74 Lorenzo Washington DE (Active/PUP); 80 active, 0 inactive

==== Week 1 roster ====
Dallas Cowboys 2010 week one roster
Quarterbacks: 3 Jon Kitna; 7 Stephen McGee; 9 Tony Romo; Running backs: 34 Deon Anderson FB; 24 Marion Barber III; 23 Tashard Choice; 44 Chris Gronkowski FB; 28 Felix Jones; Wide receivers: 19 Miles Austin; 88 Dez Bryant PR; 17 Sam Hurd; 85 Kevin Ogletree; 11 Roy Williams; Tight ends: 80 Martellus Bennett; 82 Jason Witten	Offensive linemen: 71 Alex Barron T; 79 Robert Brewster T; 75 Marc Colombo T; 67 Phil Costa C/G; 70 Leonard Davis G; 68 Doug Free T; 65 Andre Gurode C/G; 64 Montrae Holland G; 63 Kyle Kosier G/C; 76 Sam Young T; Defensive linemen: 72 Stephen Bowen DE; 92 Josh Brent NT; 97 Jason Hatcher DE; 95 Sean Lissemore NT/DE; 99 Igor Olshansky DE; 90 Jay Ratliff NT; 96 Marcus Spears DE	Linebackers: 51 Keith Brooking ILB; 57 Victor Butler OLB/DE; 56 Bradie James ILB; 50 Sean Lee ILB; 93 Anthony Spencer OLB/DE; 94 DeMarcus Ware OLB/DE; 59 Brandon Williams OLB/DE; 58 Jason Williams ILB; 52 Leon Williams ILB; Defensive backs: 20 Alan Ball FS/CB; 42 Barry Church SS; 36 Michael Hamlin SS/FS; 21 Mike Jenkins CB; 40 Danny McCray FS; 41 Terence Newman CB; 27 Akwasi Owusu-Ansah FS/CB/KR; 32 Orlando Scandrick CB; 43 Gerald Sensabaugh SS; Special teams: 18 David Buehler K; 91 L. P. Ladouceur LS; 1 Mat McBriar P	Reserve lists: 55 Stephen Hodge ILB (PUP); 89 John Phillips (IR); Practice Squad: 60 Travis Bright G; 86 Scott Chandler TE; 16 Jesse Holley WR; 15 Manuel Johnson WR; 78 Cliff Louis OT; 35 Lonyae Miller RB; 83 Martin Rucker TE; 29 Teddy Williams CB/WR; 53 active, 2 inactive, 8 PS

==== Final roster ====
Dallas Cowboys 2010 final roster
Quarterbacks: 14 Chris Greisen; 3 Jon Kitna; 7 Stephen McGee; Running backs: 24 Marion Barber; 23 Tashard Choice; 44 Chris Gronkowski FB; 28 Felix Jones; 35 Lonyae Miller; Wide receivers: 19 Miles Austin; 16 Jesse Holley; 15 Manuel Johnson; 11 Roy Williams; 10 Teddy Williams; Tight ends: 80 Martellus Bennett; 83 Martin Rucker; 82 Jason Witten	Offensive linemen: 71 Alex Barron T; 75 Marc Colombo T; 67 Phil Costa C/G; 70 Leonard Davis G; 68 Doug Free T; 65 Andre Gurode C; 64 Montrae Holland G; 63 Kyle Kosier G; 78 Jermey Parnell T; 76 Sam Young T/G; Defensive linemen: 72 Stephen Bowen DE; 92 Josh Brent NT; 66 Clifton Geathers DE; 97 Jason Hatcher DE; 99 Igor Olshansky DE; 90 Jay Ratliff NT	Linebackers: 51 Keith Brooking ILB; 57 Victor Butler OLB; 54 Kenwin Cummings ILB; 56 Bradie James ILB; 50 Sean Lee ILB; 93 Anthony Spencer OLB; 94 DeMarcus Ware OLB; 59 Brandon Williams OLB; Defensive backs: 20 Alan Ball FS; 42 Barry Church SS; 21 Mike Jenkins CB; 37 Bryan McCann CB/RS; 40 Danny McCray FS; 41 Terence Newman CB; 32 Orlando Scandrick CB/SS; 36 Andrew Sendejo SS; 43 Gerald Sensabaugh SS; Special teams: 2 Kris Brown K; 18 David Buehler K; 91 L. P. Ladouceur LS; 1 Mat McBriar P	Reserve lists: 88 Dez Bryant WR (IR); 17 Sam Hurd WR (IR); 95 Sean Lissemore DE (IR); 85 Kevin Ogletree WR (IR); 27 Akwasi Owusu-Ansah SS (IR); 89 John Phillips TE (IR); 9 Tony Romo QB (IR); 96 Marcus Spears DE (IR); 52 Leon Williams ILB (IR); Practice Squad: 84 Troy Bergeron WR; 79 Robert Brewster T; 60 Travis Bright G; 81 Jeff Moturi WR; 49 Jason Pociask TE; 58 Kelvin Smith LB; 25 Ross Weaver CB; 53 active, 9 inactive, 7 Practice Squad

== Schedule ==
=== Preseason ===
On February 24, 2010, the NFL announced that the Cowboys will face the Cincinnati Bengals in the Pro Football Hall of Fame Game at Fawcett Stadium in Canton, Ohio. The game occurred on Sunday, August 8, 2010, and was aired by NBC.

The remainder of the Cowboys' preseason schedule was announced on March 31, 2010.

Week	Date	Opponent	Result	Record	Venue	Recap
HOF	August 8	Cincinnati Bengals	W 16–7	1–0	Fawcett Stadium (Canton, Ohio)	Recap
1	August 12	Oakland Raiders	L 9–17	1–1	Cowboys Stadium	Recap
2	August 21	at San Diego Chargers	W 16–14	2–1	Qualcomm Stadium	Recap
3	August 28	at Houston Texans	L 7–23	2–2	Reliant Stadium	Recap
4	September 2	Miami Dolphins	W 27–25	3–2	Cowboys Stadium	Recap

=== Regular season ===
Week	Date	Opponent	Result	Record	Venue	Recap
1	September 12	at Washington Redskins	L 7–13	0–1	FedExField	Recap
2	September 19	Chicago Bears	L 20–27	0–2	Cowboys Stadium	Recap
3	September 26	at Houston Texans	W 27–13	1–2	Reliant Stadium	Recap
4	Bye					
5	October 10	Tennessee Titans	L 27–34	1–3	Cowboys Stadium	Recap
6	October 17	at Minnesota Vikings	L 21–24	1–4	Mall of America Field	Recap
7	October 25	New York Giants	L 35–41	1–5	Cowboys Stadium	Recap
8	October 31	Jacksonville Jaguars	L 17–35	1–6	Cowboys Stadium	Recap
9	November 7	at Green Bay Packers	L 7–45	1–7	Lambeau Field	Recap
10	November 14	at New York Giants	W 33–20	2–7	New Meadowlands Stadium	Recap
11	November 21	Detroit Lions	W 35–19	3–7	Cowboys Stadium	Recap
12	November 25	New Orleans Saints	L 27–30	3–8	Cowboys Stadium	Recap
13	December 5	at Indianapolis Colts	W 38–35 (OT)	4–8	Lucas Oil Stadium	Recap
14	December 12	Philadelphia Eagles	L 27–30	4–9	Cowboys Stadium	Recap
15	December 19	Washington Redskins	W 33–30	5–9	Cowboys Stadium	Recap
16	December 25	at Arizona Cardinals	L 26–27	5–10	University of Phoenix Stadium	Recap
17	January 2	at Philadelphia Eagles	W 14–13	6–10	Lincoln Financial Field	Recap

== Standings ==
Division

NFC East
	W	L	T	PCT	DIV	CONF	PF	PA	STK
^{(3)} Philadelphia Eagles	10	6	0	.625	4–2	7–5	439	377	L2
New York Giants	10	6	0	.625	3–3	8–4	394	347	W1
Dallas Cowboys	6	10	0	.375	3–3	4–8	394	436	W1
Washington Redskins	6	10	0	.375	2–4	4–8	302	377	L1

Conference

NFC
#	Team	Division	W	L	T	PCT	DIV	CONF	SOS	SOV	STK
Division winners
1	Atlanta Falcons	South	13	3	0	.813	5–1	10–2	.484	.438	W1
2	Chicago Bears	North	11	5	0	.688	5–1	8–4	.473	.420	L1
3 (Note: Philadelphia clinched the NFC East title based on a head-to-head sweep over the NY Giants.)	Philadelphia Eagles	East	10	6	0	.625	4–2	7–5	.492	.506	L2
4 (Note: Seattle clinched the NFC West title instead of St. Louis based on division record (4–2 to St. Louis' 3–3).)	Seattle Seahawks	West	7	9	0	.438	4–2	6–6	.484	.402	W1
Wild cards
5	New Orleans Saints	South	11	5	0	.688	4–2	9–3	.469	.426	L1
6 (Note: Green Bay clinched the NFC No. 6 seed based on better strength of victory (.475) than the NY Giants (.400) and Tampa Bay (.344).)	Green Bay Packers	North	10	6	0	.625	4–2	8–4	.520	.475	W2
Did not qualify for the postseason
7	New York Giants	East	10	6	0	.625	3–3	8–4	.453	.400	W1
8	Tampa Bay Buccaneers	South	10	6	0	.625	3–3	8–4	.477	.344	W2
9	St. Louis Rams	West	7	9	0	.438	3–3	5–7	.449	.348	L1
10 (Note: Detroit and Minnesota finished ahead of San Francisco, Dallas and Washington based on conference record (5–7 to 4–8).) (Note: Detroit finished ahead of Minnesota in the NFC North based on division record (2–4 to Minnesota's 1–5).)	Detroit Lions	North	6	10	0	.375	2–4	5–7	.543	.479	W4
11	Minnesota Vikings	North	6	10	0	.375	1–5	5–7	.539	.385	L1
12 (Note: San Francisco finished ahead of Dallas based on record versus common opponents (2–3 versus Dallas’ 1–4 against Philadelphia, New Orleans, Green Bay and Arizona).)	San Francisco 49ers	West	6	10	0	.375	4–2	4–8	.488	.375	W1
13 (Note: Dallas finished ahead of Washington in the NFC East based on division record (3–3 to Washington's 2–4).)	Dallas Cowboys	East	6	10	0	.375	3–3	4–8	.512	.500	W1
14	Washington Redskins	East	6	10	0	.375	2–4	4–8	.516	.531	L1
15	Arizona Cardinals	West	5	11	0	.313	1–5	3–9	.465	.450	L1
16	Carolina Panthers	South	2	14	0	.125	0–6	2–10	.574	.344	L2
Tiebreakers (Note: When breaking ties for three or more teams under the NFL's rules, they are first broken within divisions, then comparing only the highest-ranked remaining team from each division.)

== Preseason results ==
Pro Football Hall of Fame Game – vs Cincinnati Bengals

Quarter	1	2	3	4	Total
Cowboys	3	3	3	7	16
Bengals	0	0	0	7	7

at Fawcett Stadium, Canton, Ohio

- Date: August 8
- Game weather: 80 °F (27 °C), sunny
- Game attendance: 22,364
- Recap TV Announcers (NBC): Al Michaels, Cris Collinsworth & Andrea Kremer

Game information

First Quarter-

- Dal- D. Buehler 20-yard field goal (14 plays, 63 yards; 5:35)

Second Quarter-

- Dal- D.Buehler 34 yd. Field Goal (8 plays, 39 yards; 4:23)

Third Quarter-

- Dal- D.Buehler 23 yd. Field Goal (4 plays, 3 yards; 0:47)

Fourth Quarter-

- Dal- B. Sharpe 6 yd. interception return (D.Buehler kick)
- Cin- D. Hill 1-yard pass from J. Palmer (D. Rayner kick) (2 plays, 2 yards; 0:43)

Game leaders

- Passing: S. McGee (DAL)- 12/22 116 yards, 0 TD, 0 INT
- Rushing: T. Choice (DAL)- 7 ATT 41 yards, 0 TD
- Receiving: J. Phillips (DAL)- 4 REC 60 yards, 0 TD

Preseason Week 1 – vs Oakland Raiders

Quarter	1	2	3	4	Total
Raiders	0	0	0	17	17
Cowboys	3	0	3	3	9

at Cowboys Stadium, Arlington, Texas

- Date: August 12
- Game weather: Played indoors, retractable roof closed
- Game attendance: 72,282
- Recap

Game information

First Quarter

- Dal- D.Buehler 42-yard FieldGoal (12 plays, 45 yards; 6:35)

Second Quarter

- No scoring plays

Third Quarter

- Dal- D.Buehler 27-yard FieldGoal (9 plays, 69 yards; 4:46)

Fourth Quarter

- Dal- D.Buehler 28-yard FieldGoal (4 plays, 1 yard; 2:30)
- Oak- N.Miller 4-yard pass from K.Boller (S.Waters kick) (13 plays, 80 yards; 5:43)
- Oak- S.Janikowski 28-yard FieldGoal (7 plays, 54 yards; 2:04)
- Oak- J.Boyd 48-yard interception return (S.Janikowski kick)

Game leaders

- Passing: K. Boller (OAK) – 12/21 148 yards, 1 TD, 0 INT
- Rushing: M. Bennett (OAK) – 12 ATT 68 yards, 0 TD
- Receiving: S. Hurd (DAL) – 4 REC 57 yards, 0 TD
- Scoring Leader: D. Buehler (DAL) – 9 PTS

Preseason Week 2 – at San Diego Chargers

Quarter	1	2	3	4	Total
Cowboys	0	7	0	9	16
Chargers	0	7	0	7	14

at Qualcomm Stadium, San Diego, California

- Date: August 21
- Game weather: 76 °F (24 °C), sunny
- Game attendance: 64,372
- Recap

Game information

First Quarter-

- SD- P.Rivers 1-yard run (N.Kaeding kick) (11 plays, 40 yards; 6:14)

Second Quarter-

- Dal- M.Austin 9-yard pass from T.Romo (D.Buehler kick) (3 plays, 8 yards; 0:50)

Third Quarter-

- SD- M.Mason 4-yard run (N.Novak kick) (8 plays, 87 yards; 4:28)

Fourth Quarter-

- Dal- M.Bennett 19-yard pass from J.Kitna (D.Buehler kick) (10 plays, 67 yards; 4:37)
- Dal- R.Otterson Tackled by V.Butler in end zone for a safety (1 plays, 0 yards; 0:00)

Game leaders

- Passing: P. Rivers (SD)- 11/15 125 yards, 0 TD, 1 INT
- Rushing: R. Matthews (SD)- 12 ATT 53 yards, 0 TD
- Receiving: S. Ajirotutu (SD)- 3 REC 71 yards, 0 TD

Preseason Week 3 – at Houston Texans

Quarter	1	2	3	4	Total
Cowboys	0	0	0	7	7
Texans	7	6	10	0	23

at Reliant Stadium, Houston, Texas

- Date: August 28
- Game weather: Played indoors, retractable roof closed
- Game attendance: 70,725
- Recap

Game information

First Quarter-

- Hou- J.Jones 24-yard pass from M.Schaub (Neil Rackers kick) (6 plays, 66 yards; 3:20)

Second Quarter-

- Hou- N.Rackers 23-yard FieldGoal (17 plays, 74 yards; 7:32)
- Hou- K.Brown 22-yard FieldGoal (2 plays, 58 yards; 3:55)

Third Quarter-

- Hou- A.Foster 3-yard run (K.Brown kick) (9 plays, 80 yards; 4:06)
- Hou- N.Rackers 23-yard FieldGoal (6 plays, 27 yards; 3:25)

Fourth Quarter-

- Dal- K.Ogletree 24-yard pass from J.Kitna (D.Buehler kick) (5 plays, 53 yards; 2:08)

Game leaders

- Passing: M. Schaub (HOU)- 18/29 183 yards, 1 TD, 0 INT
- Rushing: A. Foster (HOU)- 18 ATT 110 yards, 1 TD
- Receiving: A. Johnson (HOU)- 7 REC 79 yards, 0 TD

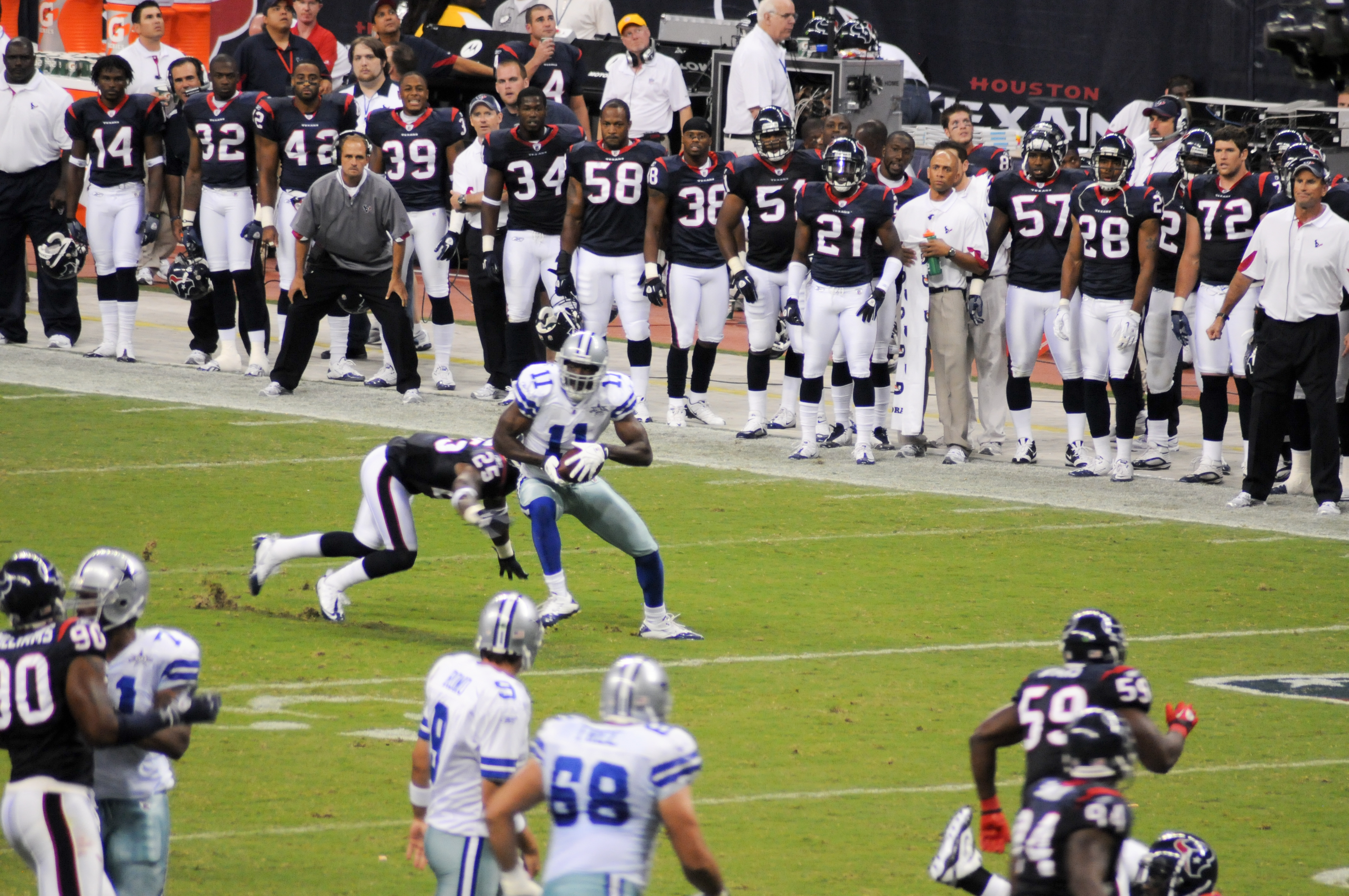

Preseason Week 4 – vs Miami Dolphins

Quarter	1	2	3	4	Total
Dolphins	3	0	7	15	25
Cowboys	0	10	6	11	27

at Cowboys Stadium, Arlington, Texas

- Date: September 2
- Game weather: Played indoors, retractable roof closed
- Game attendance: 71,805
- Recap

Game information

First Quarter-

- Mia- D.Carpenter 28-yard FieldGoal (12 plays, 46 yards; 5:41)

Second Quarter-

- Dal- S.Hurd 43-yard pass from S.Mcgee (D.Buehler kick) (4 plays, 54 yards; 2:08)
- Mia- B.Hartline 2-yard pass from C.Pennington (D.Carpenter kick) (11 plays, 80 yards; 5:28)
- Dal- D.Buehler 51-yard FieldGoal (8 plays, 49 yards; 1:00)

Third Quarter-

- Dal- D.Buehler 45-yard FieldGoal (10 plays, 41 yards; 5:16)
- Dal- D.Buehler 40-yard FieldGoal (8 plays, 33 yards; 2:47)

Fourth Quarter-

- Mia- M.Moore 3-yard pass from T.Thigpen (D.Carpenter kick) (8 plays, 63 yards; 3:03)
- Dal- H.Donaldson 1-yard run (L.Miller run for Two-Point Conversion) (12 plays, 77 yards; 6:23)
- Mia- R.Wallace 6-yard pass from T.Thigpen (L.Hilliard run for Two-Point Conversion) (7 plays, 72 yards; 3:18)
- Dal- D.Buehler 31-yard FieldGoal (10 plays, 75 yards; 2:22)

Game leaders

- Passing: S. McGee (DAL)- 27/42 304 yards, 1 TD, 0 INT
- Rushing: R. Williams (MIA)- 2 ATT 45 yards, 0 TD
- Receiving: R. Wallace (MIA)- 3 REC 59 yards, 1 TD

== Regular season results ==
=== Week 1: at Washington Redskins ===
Week 1: Dallas Cowboys at Washington Redskins – Game summary

Quarter	1	2	3	4	Total
Cowboys	0	0	7	0	7
Redskins	3	7	0	3	13

at FedExField, Landover, Maryland

- Game time: 8:20 PM EDT (7:20 PM CDT)
- Game weather: 66 °F (19 °C) (Cloudy)
- Game attendance: 90,670
- Referee: Tony Corrente
- TV announcers (NBC): Al Michaels, Cris Collinsworth, and Andrea Kremer
- Recap

Game information

First quarter

- WAS – Graham Gano 29-yard field goal, Redskins 3–0, Drive: 12 plays, 69 yards, 6:26.

Second quarter

- WAS – DeAngelo Hall 32 fumble return (Graham Gano kick), Redskins 10–0.

Third quarter

- DAL – Miles Austin 4-yard pass from Tony Romo (David Buehler kick), Redskins 10–7, Drive: 6 plays, 34 yards, 3:26.

Fourth quarter

- WAS – Graham Gano 49-yard field goal, Redskins 13–7, Drive: 10 plays, 46 yards, 4:24.

Top passers

- DAL – Tony Romo – 31/47, 282 yards, 1 touchdown
- WAS – Donovan McNabb – 15/32, 171 yards

Top rushers

- DAL – Marion Barber – 8 rushes, 39 yards
- WAS – Clinton Portis – 18 rushes, 63yards

Top receivers

- DAL – Miles Austin – 10 receptions, 146 yards, 1 touchdown
- WAS – Chris Cooley – 6 receptions, 80 yards

Top tacklers

- DAL – Alan Ball – 6 tackles, 1 forced fumble; DeMarcus Ware – 6 tackles, 1 sack
- WAS – LaRon Landry – 13 tackles, 4 assists

The Dallas Cowboys began their season at FedExField on Sunday night against their NFC East rival, the Washington Redskins. The Cowboys trailed early in the first quarter as Redskins kicker Graham Gano got a 29-yard field goal. Dallas would then trail in the second quarter as cornerback DeAngelo Hall returned a fumble 25 yards for a touchdown.

In the third quarter, Dallas would finally get on the board as quarterback Tony Romo completed a 4-yard touchdown pass to wide receiver Miles Austin. Washington would respond in the fourth quarter as Gano made a 49-yard field goal. Afterwards, Romo threw what would have been the game-winning 13-yard touchdown pass to wide receiver Roy Williams, but a holding call on offensive tackle Alex Barron effectively ended the game.

With the loss, the Cowboys began their season at 0–1.

=== Week 2: vs. Chicago Bears ===
Week 2: Chicago Bears at Dallas Cowboys – Game summary

Quarter	1	2	3	4	Total
Bears	10	10	0	7	27
Cowboys	7	7	3	3	20

at Cowboys Stadium, Arlington, Texas

- Game time: 1:00 PM EDT (12:00 PM CDT)
- Game weather: Played indoors, retractable roof closed
- Game attendance: 85,168
- Referee: Scott Green
- TV announcers (Fox): Joe Buck, Troy Aikman, and Pam Oliver
- Recap

Game information

First quarter

- CHI – Robbie Gould 38-yard field goal, Bears 3–0, Drive: 4 plays, 3 yards, 2:37.
- DAL – Dez Bryant 62-yard punt return (David Buehler kick), Cowboys 7–3.
- CHI – Greg Olsen 39-yard pass from Jay Cutler (Robbie Gould kick), Bears 10–7, Drive: 3 plays, 58 yards, 1:35.

Second quarter

- DAL – Chris Gronkowski 1-yard pass from Tony Romo (David Buehler kick), Cowboys 14–10, Drive: 13 plays, 73 yards, 7:53.
- CHI – Devin Hester 9-yard pass from Jay Cutler (Robbie Gould kick), Bears 17–14, Drive: 6 plays, 74 yards, 4:38.
- CHI – Robbie Gould 40-yard field goal, Bears 20–14, Drive: 9 plays, 25 yards, 1:19.

Third quarter

- DAL – David Buehler 28-yard field goal, Bears 20–17, Drive: 8 plays, 56 yards, 4:24.

Fourth quarter

- CHI – Matt Forte 3-yard pass from Jay Cutler (Robbie Gould kick), Bears 27–17, Drive: 4 plays, 66 yards, 2:07.
- DAL – David Buehler 48-yard field goal, Bears 27–20, Drive: 8 plays, 50 yards, 1:28.

Top passers

- CHI – Jay Cutler – 21/29, 277 yards, 3 touchdowns
- DAL – Tony Romo – 3451, 374 yards, 1 touchdown, 2 interceptions

Top rushers

- CHI – Matt Forte – 10 rushes, 29 yards
- DAL – Marion Barber – 11 rushes, 31 yards

Top receivers

- CHI – Johnny Knox – 4 receptions, 86 yards
- DAL – Miles Austin – 10 receptions, 142 yards

Top tacklers

- CHI – Zack Bowman – 8 tackles, 2 assists
- DAL – Bradie James – 5 tackles, 1 assist

Hoping to rebound from their loss to the Redskins the Cowboys played at home ground for an NFC duel with the Bears. In the first quarter Dallas trailed early as kicker Robbie Gould nailed a 38-yard field goal. Then they replied with wide receiver Dez Bryant returning a punt 62 yards to the endzone for a touchdown. The Bears got the lead back when quarterback Jay Cutler made a 39-yard touchdown pass to tight end Greg Olsen. In the 2nd quarter the Cowboys replied again when quarterback Tony Romo made a 1-yard touchdown pass to running back Chris Gronkowski, but fell behind with Cutler making a 9-yard touchdown pass to wide receiver Devin Hester, followed by kicker Robbie Gould making a 40-yard field goal. In the third quarter Dallas would reply with kicker David Buehler nailing a 28-yard field goal. However, they continued to struggle in the fourth quarter when Cutler made a 3-yard touchdown pass to running back Matt Forte, but the Cowboys made the final score of the game when Buehler got a 48-yard field goal.

With the loss, Dallas fell to 0–2 for the first time since 2001 when they finished 5–11.

=== Week 3: at Houston Texans ===
Week 3: Dallas Cowboys at Houston Texans – Game summary

Quarter	1	2	3	4	Total
Cowboys	0	10	7	10	27
Texans	0	3	0	10	13

at Reliant Stadium, Houston, Texas

- Date: September 26
- Game time: 12:00 p.m. CDT or 1:00 p.m. Eastern
- Game weather: None (retractable roof closed)
- Game attendance: 71,456
- Referee: Carl Cheffers
- TV announcers (Fox): Joe Buck, Troy Aikman and Pam Oliver
- Recap

Game information

First quarter

Second quarter

- HOU – Neil Rackers 24-yard field goal, Texans 3–0, Drive: 13 plays, 65 yards, 6:19.
- DAL – Marion Barber 1-yard run (David Buehler kick), Cowboys 7–3, Drive: 13 plays, 80 yards, 7:30.
- DAL – David Buehler 49-yard field goal, Cowboys 10–3, Drive: 7 plays, 32 yards, 1:40.

Third quarter

- DAL – Roy E. Williams 15-yard pass from Tony Romo (David Buehler kick), Cowboys 17–3, Drive: 7 plays, 90 yards, 4:02.

Fourth quarter

- HOU – Neil Rackers 30-yard field goal, Cowboys 17–6, Drive: 9 plays, 64 yards, 4:31.
- DAL – Roy E. Williams 63-yard pass from Tony Romo (David Buehler kick), Cowboys 24–6, Drive: 4 plays, 74 yards, 2:10.
- DAL – David Buehler 40-yard field goal, Cowboys 27–6, Drive: 10 plays, 29 yards, 5:28.
- HOU – Kevin Walter 7-yard pass from Matt Schaub (Neil Rackers kick), Cowboys 27–13, Drive: 9 plays, 77 yards, 2:21.

Top passers

- DAL – Tony Romo – 23/30, 284 yards, 2 touchdowns
- HOU – Matt Schaub – 23/32, 241 yards, 1 touchdown, 2 interceptions

Top rushers

- DAL – Marion Barber – 17 rushes, 55 yards, 1 touchdown
- HOU – Arian Foster – 17 rushes, 106 yards

Top receivers

- DAL – Roy E. Williams – 5 receptions, 117 yards, 2 touchdowns
- HOU – Andre Johnson – 4 receptions, 64 yards

Top tacklers

- DAL – Terence Newman, Gerald Sensabaugh – 7 tackles
- HOU – Bernard Pollard – 6 tackles, 9 assists

Still looking for their first win, the Cowboys flew to Reliant Stadium for a Texas rivalry match against the Houston Texans. Dallas trailed early in the second quarter when kicker Neil Rackers hit a 24-yard field goal. Then they took the lead with running back Marion Barber getting a 1-yard touchdown run, followed by kicker David Buehler's 49-yard field goal. The Cowboys increased their lead in the third quarter when quarterback Tony Romo completed a 15-yard touchdown pass to wide receiver Roy E. Williams. Houston replied with Rackers nailing a 30-yard field goal, but Dallas continued to score when Romo found Williams again on a 63-yard touchdown pass. Then David Buehler made a 40-yard field goal. The Texans would finally score when quarterback Matt Schaub made a 7-yard touchdown pass to wide receiver Kevin Walter; the Texans' onside kick attempt was good, but an interception made by Dallas safety Danny McCray ended any chances of a Texans comeback.

With the win, Dallas went into its bye week at 1–2.

=== Week 5: vs. Tennessee Titans ===
Week 5: Tennessee Titans at Dallas Cowboys – Game summary

Quarter	1	2	3	4	Total
Titans	10	7	3	14	34
Cowboys	3	7	7	10	27

at Cowboys Stadium, Arlington, Texas

- Date: October 10
- Game time: 3:15 p.m. CDT
- Game weather: None (retractable roof closed)
- Game attendance: 90,616
- Referee: Jeff Triplette
- TV announcers (CBS): Jim Nantz and Phil Simms
- Recap

Game information

First quarter

- TEN – Nate Washington 24-yard pass from Vince Young (Rob Bironas kick), Titans 7–0, Drive: 6 plays, 80 yards, 2:20.
- TEN – Rob Bironas 52-yard field goal, Titans 10–0, Drive: 9 plays, 52 yards, 4:41.
- DAL – David Buehler 51-yard field goal, Titans 10–3, Drive: 8 plays, 39 yards, 4:25.

Second quarter

- TEN – Kenny Britt 12-yard pass from Vince Young (Rob Bironas kick), Titans 17–3, Drive: 7 plays, 67 yards, 3:29.
- DAL – Roy E. Williams 12-yard pass from Tony Romo (David Buehler kick), Titans 17–10, Drive: 8 plays, 75 yards, 1:42.

Third quarter

- DAL – Miles Austin 69-yard pass from Tony Romo (David Buehler kick), Tied 17–17, Drive: 3 plays, 75 yards, 1:26.
- TEN – Rob Bironas 40-yard field goal, Titans 20–17, Drive: 5 plays, 59 yards, 1:53.

Fourth quarter

- DAL – David Buehler 26-yard field goal, Tied 20–20, Drive: 9 plays, 56 yards, 5:05.
- TEN – Chris Johnson 1-yard run (Rob Bironas kick), Titans 27–20, Drive: 1 plays, 1 yards, 0:04.
- DAL – Jason Witten 18-yard pass from Tony Romo (David Buehler kick), Tied 27–27, Drive: 7 plays, 60 yards, 2:56.
- TEN – Chris Johnson 1-yard run (Rob Bironas kick), Titans 34–27, Drive: 3 plays, 5 yards, 1:02.

Top passers

- TEN – Vince Young – 12/25, 173 yards, 2 touchdowns
- DAL – Tony Romo – 31/46, 406 yards, 3 touchdowns, 3 interceptions

Top rushers

- TEN – Chris Johnson – 19 rushes, 131 yards, 2 touchdowns
- DAL – Felix Jones – 15 rushes, 109 yards

Top receivers

- TEN – Kenny Britt – 4 receptions, 86 yards, 1 touchdown
- DAL – Miles Austin – 9 receptions, 166 yards, 1 touchdown

Top tacklers

- TEN – Stephen Tulloch – 8 tackles, 5 assists, 1 interception
- DAL – Bradie James – 5 tackles, 1 assist, 1 forced fumble

Coming off their road win over the Texans, the Cowboys went home for a Week 5 interconference duel with the Tennessee Titans. Dallas trailed early in the first quarter as Titans quarterback Vince Young completed a 24-yard touchdown pass to wide receiver Nate Washington, followed by kicker Rob Bironas making a 52-yard field goal. The Cowboys answered with a 51-yard field goal from kicker David Buehler. However, Tennessee came right back in the second quarter as Young found wide receiver Kenny Britt on a 12-yard touchdown pass. Dallas would strike back as quarterback Tony Romo hooked up with wide receiver Roy Williams on a 6-yard touchdown pass.

In the third quarter, the Cowboys tied the game as Romo found wide receiver Miles Austin on a 69-yard touchdown pass. However, the Titans would retake the lead on Bironas' 40-yard field goal. Dallas tied the game again in the fourth quarter as Buehler booted a 26-yard field goal, but Tennessee struck back as running back Chris Johnson got a 1-yard touchdown. Afterwards, the Cowboys would tie the game yet again as Romo found tight end Jason Witten on an 18-yard touchdown pass. However, the Titans continued to pound away as Johnson got another 1-yard touchdown run.

With the loss, Dallas fell to 1–3.

=== Week 6: at Minnesota Vikings ===
Week 6: Dallas Cowboys at Minnesota Vikings – Game summary

Quarter	1	2	3	4	Total
Cowboys	7	7	0	7	21
Vikings	7	0	14	3	24

at Mall of America Field at the Hubert H. Humphrey Metrodome, Minneapolis, Minnesota

- Game time: 4:15 PM EDT (3:15 PM CDT)
- Game weather: None (dome stadium)
- Game attendance: 64,120
- Referee: Gene Steratore
- TV announcers (Fox): Thom Brennaman, Troy Aikman, and Pam Oliver
- Recap

Game information

First quarter

- DAL – Roy E. Williams 15-yard pass from Tony Romo (David Buehler kick), Cowboys 7–0, Drive: 8 plays, 48 yards, 4:03.
- MIN – Greg Camarillo 10-yard pass from Brett Favre (Ryan Longwell kick), Tied 7–7, Drive: 3 plays, 16 yards, 1:25.

Second quarter

- DAL – Roy E. Williams 2-yard pass from Tony Romo (David Buehler kick), Cowboys 14–7, Drive: 13 plays, 82 yards, 7:05.

Third quarter

- MIN – Percy Harvin 95-yard kickoff return (Ryan Longwell kick), Tied 14–14, Drive: 0 plays, 0 yards, 0:12.
- MIN – Adrian Peterson 1-yard run (Ryan Longwell kick), Vikings 21–14, Drive: 9 plays, 49 yards, 5:19.

Fourth quarter

- DAL – Dez Bryant 31-yard pass from Tony Romo (David Buehler kick), Tied 21–21, Drive: 10 plays, 65 yards, 5:25.
- MIN – Ryan Longwell 38-yard field goal, Vikings 24–21, Drive: 7 plays, 10 yards, 3:30.

Top passers

- DAL – Tony Romo – 24/32, 220 yards, 3 touchdowns, 2 interceptions
- MIN – Brett Favre – 14/19, 118 yards, 1 touchdown

Top rushers

- DAL – Felix Jones – 14 rushes, 32 yards
- MIN – Adrian Peterson – 24 rushes, 73 yards, 1 touchdown

Top receivers

- DAL – Felix Jones – 10 receptions, 61 yards
- MIN – Randy Moss – 5 receptions, 55 yards

Top tacklers

- DAL – Bradie James – 9 tackles, 1 assist
- MIN – Chad Greenway – 8 tackles, 4 assists

Hoping to rebound from their loss to the Titans, the Cowboys flew to the Hubert H. Humphrey Metrodome for a Week 6 duel with the Minnesota Vikings. Dallas delivered the opening punch in the first quarter as quarterback Tony Romo found wide receiver Roy Williams on a 15-yard touchdown pass. The Vikings answered with quarterback Brett Favre completed a 10-yard touchdown pass to wide receiver Greg Camarillo. In the second quarter, the Cowboys regained the lead as Romo and Williams hooked up with each other again on a 2-yard touchdown pass.

Minnesota took the lead in the third quarter as wide receiver Percy Harvin returned the half's opening kickoff 95 yards for a touchdown, followed by running back Adrian Peterson's 1-yard touchdown run. In the fourth quarter, Dallas tied the game as Romo connected with rookie wide receiver Dez Bryant on a 31-yard touchdown pass. The Vikings responded with kicker Ryan Longwell making a 38-yard field goal.

With only 5 seconds left in the game, the Cowboys attempted a lateral play, in a fashion similar to The Play, River City Relay, and the Music City Miracle. However, Romo was then flagged for throwing a forward pass after crossing the line of scrimmage, ending the game.

With the loss, the Cowboys fell to 1–4.

=== Week 7: vs. New York Giants ===
Week 7: New York Giants at Dallas Cowboys – Game summary

Quarter	1	2	3	4	Total
Giants	7	17	14	3	41
Cowboys	10	10	0	15	35

at Cowboys Stadium, Arlington, Texas

- Game time: 8:30 PM EDT (7:30 PM CDT)
- Game weather: 84 °F (29 °C) (Roof open)
- Game attendance: 91,375
- Referee: John Parry
- TV announcers (ESPN): Mike Tirico, Ron Jaworski, and Jon Gruden
- recap

Game information

First quarter

- DAL – Jason Witten 3-yard pass from Tony Romo (David Buehler kick), Cowboys 7–0, Drive: 2 plays, 5 yards, 0:49.
- DAL – David Buehler 26-yard field goal, Cowboys 10–0, Drive: 6 plays, 10 yards, 2:54.
- NYG – Hakeem Nicks 7-yard pass from Eli Manning (Lawrence Tynes kick), Cowboys 10–7, Drive: 11 plays, 79 yards, 6:10.

Second quarter

- DAL – David Buehler 41-yard field goal, Cowboys 13–7, Drive: 5 plays, 20 yards, 2:10.
- DAL – Dez Bryant 93-yard punt return (David Buehler kick), Cowboys 20–7.
- NYG – Hakeem Nicks 8-yard pass from Eli Manning (Lawrence Tynes kick), Cowboys 20–14, Drive: 7 plays, 80 yards, 4:31.
- NYG – Steve Smith 14-yard pass from Eli Manning (Lawrence Tynes kick), Giants 21–20, Drive: 5 plays, 56 yards, 2:01.
- NYG – Lawrence Tynes 53-yard field goal, Giants 24–20, Drive: 5 plays, 9 yards, 0:34.

Third quarter

- NYG – Mario Manningham 25-yard pass from Eli Manning (Lawrence Tynes kick), Giants 31–20, Drive: 5 plays, 55 yards, 2:21.
- NYG – Brandon Jacobs 30-yard run (Lawrence Tynes kick), Giants 38–20, Drive: 6 plays, 70 yards, 3:49.

Fourth quarter

- DAL – Dez Bryant 15-yard pass from Jon Kitna (Jon Kitna – Jason Witten pass), Giants 38–28, Drive: 1 plays, 15 yards, 0:05.
- NYG – Lawrence Tynes 26-yard field goal, Giants 41–28, Drive: 5 plays, 31 yards, 1:22.
- DAL – Dez Bryant 15-yard pass from Jon Kitna (David Buehler kick), Giants 41–35, Drive: 8 plays, 73 yards, 1:15.

Top passers

- NYG – Eli Manning – 25/35, 306 yards, 4 touchdowns, 3 interceptions
- DAL – Jon Kitna – 16/33, 187 yards, 2 touchdowns

Top rushers

- NYG – Ahmad Bradshaw – 24 rushes, 126 yards
- DAL – Felix Jones – 9 rushes, 35 yards

Top receivers

- NYG – Hakeem Nicks – 9 receptions, 108 yards, 2 touchdowns
- DAL – Jason Witten – 9 receptions, 95 yards, 1 touchdown

Top tacklers

- NYG – Hakeem Nicks – 9 receptions, 108 yards, 2 touchdowns
- DAL – Jason Witten – 9 receptions, 95 yards, 1 touchdown

Trying to snap a two-game losing streak, the Cowboys went home for a Week 7 NFC East duel with the New York Giants on Monday night. Dallas got the opening strike in the first quarter as quarterback Tony Romo found tight end Jason Witten on a 4-yard touchdown run, followed by a 26-yard field goal from kicker David Buehler. The Giants answered with quarterback Eli Manning completing a 7-yard touchdown pass to wide receiver Hakeem Nicks. The Cowboys would add onto their lead in the second quarter as Buehler booted a 41-yard field goal, followed by rookie wide receiver Dez Bryant returning a punt 93 yards for a touchdown. New York took the lead with Manning throwing an 8-yard touchdown pass to Nicks and a 14-yard touchdown pass to wide receiver Steve Smith. Afterwards, the Giants closed out the half with kicker Lawrence Tynes getting a 53-yard field goal. During the half, Romo suffered a broken left clavicle on a completion from a blocking error.

Dallas' deficit increased in the third quarter as Manning completed a 25-yard touchdown pass to wide receiver Mario Manningham, followed by running back Brandon Jacobs getting a 30-yard touchdown run. The Cowboys began to rally in the fourth quarter as quarterback Jon Kitna found Bryant on a 15-yard touchdown pass (with a successful two-point conversion pass to Witten), yet New York answered with a 26-yard field goal from Tynes. Dallas tried to rally as Kitna hooked up with Bryant again on a 15-yard touchdown pass. With the loss, the Cowboys fell to 1–5.

=== Week 8: vs. Jacksonville Jaguars ===
Week 8: Jacksonville Jaguars at Dallas Cowboys – Game summary

Quarter	1	2	3	4	Total
Jaguars	7	7	14	7	35
Cowboys	3	0	0	14	17

at Cowboys Stadium, Arlington, Texas

- Date: October 31
- Game time: 1:00 p.m. EDT
- Game weather: None (retractable roof closed)
- Game attendance: 81,395
- Referee: Clete Blakeman
- TV announcers (CBS): Jim Nantz and Phil Simms
- Game Recap

Game information

Scoring

First quarter

- DAL – David Buehler 34-yard field goal, Cowboys 3–0, Drive: 9 plays, 54 yards, 4:14.
- JAC – Mike Sims-Walker 10-yard pass from David Garrard (Josh Scobee kick), Jaguars 7–3, Drive: 5 plays, 63 yards, 2:56.

Second quarter

- JAC – Marcedes Lewis 42-yard pass from David Garrard (Josh Scobee kick), Jaguars 14–3, Drive: 4 plays, 77 yards, 1:53.

Third quarter

- JAC – Mike Thomas 15-yard pass from David Garrard (Josh Scobee kick), Jaguars 21–3, Drive: 6 plays, 83 yards, 2:46.
- JAC – Marcedes Lewis 9-yard pass from David Garrard (Josh Scobee kick), Jaguars 28–3, Drive: 5 plays, 33 yards, 1:55.

Fourth quarter

- DAL – Marion Barber 1-yard run (David Buehler kick), Jaguars 28–10, Drive: 8 plays, 80 yards, 2:41.
- JAC – David Garrard 2-yard run (Josh Scobee kick), Jaguars 35–10, Drive: 3 plays, 7 yards, 1:27.
- DAL – Jason Witten 8-yard pass from Jon Kitna (David Buehler kick), Jaguars 35–17, Drive: 13 plays, 74 yards, 3:21.

Top passers

- JAC – David Garrard – 17/21, 260 yards, 4 touchdowns
- DAL – Jon Kitna – 34/49, 379 yards, 1 touchdown, 4 interceptions

Top rushers

- JAC – Maurice Jones-Drew – 27 rushes, 135 yards
- DAL – Felix Jones – 8 rushes, 22 yards

Top receivers

- JAC – Mike Sims-Walker – 8 receptions, 153 yards, 1 touchdown
- DAL – Miles Austin – 7 receptions, 117 yards

Top tacklers

- JAC – Justin Durant – 9 tackles, 3 assists
- DAL – Keith Brooking – 6 tackles, 4 assists

Hoping to break their current losing streak the Cowboys played on home ground for an interconference duel with the Jaguars. In the first quarter the Cowboys took the lead as kicker David Buehler hit a 34-yard field goal. But they fell behind with quarterback David Garrard getting a 10-yard touchdown pass to wide receiver Mike Sims-Walker. In the second quarter, the Cowboys struggled further with Garrard finding tight end Marcedes Lewis on a 42-yard touchdown pass, then in the third quarter he found wide receiver Mike Thomas on a 15-yard touchdown pass, and then he found Lewis again on a 9-yard touchdown pass. The Cowboys responded in the 4th quarter with running back Marion Barber getting a 1-yard touchdown run. But the Jaguars scored again with Garrard scrambling 2 yards to the endzone for a touchdown. The Cowboys replied with quarterback Jon Kitna making an 8-yard touchdown pass to tight end Jason Witten.

With the loss, Dallas fell to 1–6.

=== Week 9: at Green Bay Packers ===
Week 9: Dallas Cowboys at Green Bay Packers – Game summary

Quarter	1	2	3	4	Total
Cowboys	0	7	0	0	7
Packers	0	28	7	10	45

at Lambeau Field, Green Bay, Wisconsin

- Date: November 7
- Game time: 8:20 PM EST (7:20 PM CST)
- Game attendance: 70,913
- Referee: Walt Coleman
- TV announcers (NBC): Al Michaels, Cris Collinsworth, and Andrea Kremer
- Recap

Game information

First quarter

- No scoring plays

Second quarter

- GB – Brandon Jackson 9-yard pass from Aaron Rodgers (Mason Crosby kick), Packers 7–0, Drive: 8 plays, 63 yards, 3:20.
- GB – Brandon Jackson 2-yard run (Mason Crosby kick), Packers 14–0, Drive: 7 plays, 80 yards, 3:52.
- GB – Greg Jennings 8-yard pass from Aaron Rodgers (Mason Crosby kick), Packers 21–0, Drive: 10 plays, 93 yards, 4:56.
- GB – Nick Collins 26-yard fumble return (Mason Crosby kick), Packers 28–0.
- DAL – Dez Bryant 2-yard pass from Jon Kitna (David Buehler kick), Packers 28–7, Drive: 7 plays, 60 yards, 1:58.

Third quarter

- GB – James Jones 10-yard pass from Aaron Rodgers (Mason Crosby kick), Packers 35–7, Drive: 8 plays, 63 yards, 1:48.

Fourth quarter

- GB – Mason Crosby 26-yard field goal, Packers 38–7, Drive: 16 plays, 80 yards, 9:13.
- GB – Clay Matthews 62-yard interception return (Mason Crosby kick), Packers 45–7.

Top passers

- DAL – Jon Kitna – 19/30, 183 yards, 1 touchdown, 2 interceptions
- GB – Aaron Rodgers – 27/34, 289 yards, 3 touchdowns

Top rushers

- DAL – Felix Jones – 5 rushes, 16 yards
- GB – John Kuhn – 13 rushes, 50 yards

Top receivers

- DAL – Dez Bryant – 9 receptions, 86 yards, 1 touchdown
- GB – James Jones – 8 receptions, 123 yards, 1 touchdown

Top tacklers

- DAL – Keith Brooking – 8 tackles, 2 assists
- GB – Charles Woodson – 5 tackles, 1 sack, 1 forced fumble

Looking for their second win the Cowboys flew to Lambeau Field for an NFC duel with the Packers. The second quarter saw the Cowboys trail immediately after quarterback Aaron Rodgers got a 9-yard touchdown pass to running back Brandon Jackson. This was followed by Jackson making a 2-yard touchdown run, and with Rodgers completing an 8-yard touchdown pass to wide receiver Greg Jennings. The Cowboys struggled further after free safety Nick Collins recovered a fumble and ran 26 yards for a touchdown. The Cowboys would make their only score of the game with quarterback Jon Kitna making a 2-yard touchdown pass to wide receiver Dez Bryant. They fell further behind after Rodgers found wide receiver Jones on a 10-yard touchdown pass, and with Crosby hitting a 26-yard field goal. The Cowboys had more problems when Kitna's pass was intercepted by outside linebacker Clay Matthews and returned 62 yards for a touchdown.

With the loss, the Cowboys fell to 1–7. After the game, head coach Wade Phillips was fired and offensive coordinator Jason Garrett became the interim head coach.

=== Week 10: at New York Giants ===
Week 10: Dallas Cowboys at New York Giants – Game summary

Quarter	1	2	3	4	Total
Cowboys	6	13	14	0	33
Giants	3	3	14	0	20

at New Meadowlands Stadium, East Rutherford, New Jersey

- Game time: 4:15 PM EST (3:15 PM CST)
- Game weather: 60 °F (16 °C) (Clear)
- Game attendance: 80,851
- Referee: Bill Leavy
- TV announcers (Fox): Joe Buck, Troy Aikman, and Pam Oliver
- Recap

Game information

First quarter

- NYG – Lawrence Tynes 43-yard field goal, Giants 3–0, 'Drive: 10 plays, 55 yards, 5:11.
- DAL – Dez Bryant 13-yard pass from Jon Kitna (kick blocked), Cowboys 6–3, 'Drive: 3 plays, 71 yards, 1:36.

Second quarter

- DAL – David Buehler 22-yard field goal, Cowboys 9–3, 'Drive: 3 plays, 71 yards, 1:36.
- DAL – Bryan McCann 101-yard interception return (David Buehler kick), Cowboys 16–3.
- DAL – David Buehler 23-yard field goal, Cowboys 19–3, 'Drive: 5 plays, 39 yards, 1:55.
- NYG – Lawrence Tynes 25-yard field goal, Cowboys 19–6, 'Drive: 7 plays, 67 yards, 1:40.

Third quarter

- DAL – Felix Jones 71-yard pass from Jon Kitna (David Buehler kick), Cowboys 26–6, 'Drive: 3 plays, 71 yards, 1:04.
- NYG – Mario Manningham 5-yard pass from Eli Manning (Lawrence Tynes kick), Cowboys 26–13, 'Drive: 8 plays, 58 yards, 5:00.
- DAL – Miles Austin 24-yard pass from Jon Kitna (David Buehler kick), Cowboys 33–13, 'Drive: 6 plays, 85 yards, 2:29.
- NYG – Kevin Boss 35-yard pass from Eli Manning (Lawrence Tynes kick), Cowboys 33–20, 'Drive: 2 plays, 73 yards, 1:08.

Fourth quarter

- No scoring plays

Top passers

- DAL – Jon Kitna – 13/22, 327 yards, 3 touchdowns, 1 interception
- NYG – Eli Manning – 33/48, 373 yards, 2 touchdowns, 2 interceptions

Top rushers

- DAL – Felix Jones – 14 rushes, 51 yards
- NYG – Ahmad Bradshaw – 20 rushes, 73 yards

Top receivers

- DAL – Dez Bryant – 3 receptions, 104 yards, 1 touchdowns
- NYG – Mario Manningham – 10 receptions, 91 yards, 1 touchdown

Top tacklers

- DAL – Bradie James – 7 tackles, 6 assists
- NYG – Terrell Thomas – 5 tackles, 3 assists

Trying to snap a five-game losing streak, the Cowboys flew to New Meadowlands Stadium for a Week 10 NFC East rematch with the New York Giants. Dallas trailed in the first quarter as Giants kicker Lawrence Tynes made a 43-yard field goal. The Cowboys answered with quarterback Jon Kitna connecting to rookie wide receiver Dez Bryant on a 13-yard touchdown pass (with a blocked extra point). Dallas added onto their lead in the second quarter with a 22-yard field goal from kicker David Buehler, followed by rookie cornerback Bryan McCann returning an interception 101 yards for a touchdown and Buehler's 23-yard field goal. New York answered with Tynes making a 25-yard field goal.

The Cowboys continued its dominating day in the third quarter as Kitna found running back Felix Jones on a 71-yard touchdown pass. The Giants responded with quarterback Eli Manning completing a 5-yard touchdown pass to wide receiver Mario Manningham, yet Dallas rebounded with Kitna hooking up with wide receiver Miles Austin on a 24-yard touchdown pass. However, New York continued its persistent play with Manning completing a 35-yard touchdown pass to tight end Kevin Boss. Fortunately, the Cowboys' defense held its ground in the fourth quarter to preserve the victory.

The game was delayed in the third quarter for about fifteen minutes when the lights at the New Meadowlands Stadium went out. Since it was already dark outside in New Jersey by that time, it was totally dark in the stadium.

With the win, Dallas improved to 2–7.

=== Week 11: vs. Detroit Lions ===
Week 11: Detroit Lions at Dallas Cowboys – Game summary

Quarter	1	2	3	4	Total
Lions	0	10	9	0	19
Cowboys	7	0	14	14	35

at Cowboys Stadium, Arlington, Texas

- Game time: 1:00 PM EST (12:00 PM CST)
- Game weather: None (retractable roof closed)
- Game attendance: 81,261
- Referee: Carl Cheffers
- TV announcers (Fox): Kenny Albert, Daryl Johnston, and Tony Siragusa
- https://www.nfl.com/gamecenter/2010112105/2010/REG11/lions@cowboys

Game information

First quarter

- DAL – Dez Bryant 1-yard pass from Jon Kitna (David Buehler kick), Cowboys 7–0, 'Drive: 13 plays, 98 yards, 7:16.

Second quarter

- DET – Dave Rayner 47-yard field goal, Cowboys 7–3, 'Drive: 11 plays, 51 yards, 5:20.
- DET – Nate Burleson 9-yard pass from Shaun Hill (Dave Rayner kick), Lions 10–7, 'Drive: 3 plays, 14 yards, 0:19.

Third quarter

- DET – Penalty on Leonard Davis enforced in endzone for a safety, Lions 12–7.
- DAL – Bryan McCann 97-yard punt return (David Buehler kick), Cowboys 14–12.
- DAL – Miles Austin 3-yard pass from Jon Kitna (David Buehler kick), Cowboys 21–12, 'Drive: 4 plays, 19 yards, 2:07.
- DET – Calvin Johnson 14-yard pass from Shaun Hill (Dave Rayner kick), Cowboys 21–19, 'Drive: 6 plays, 80 yards, 2:23.

Fourth quarter

- DAL – Miles Austin 4-yard pass from Jon Kitna (Dave Rayner kick), Cowboys 28–19, 'Drive: 16 plays, 71 yards, 7:55.
- DAL – Jon Kitna 29-yard run (David Buehler kick), Cowboys 35–19, 'Drive: 9 plays, 80 yards, 4:40.

Top passers

- DET – Shaun Hill – 32/47, 289 yards, 2 touchdowns, 1 interception
- DAL – Jon Kitna – 18/24, 147 yards, 3 touchdowns

Top rushers

- DET – Maurice Morris – 10 rushes, 31 yards
- DAL – Felix Jones – 11 rushes, 51 yards

Top receivers

- DET – Nate Burleson – 7 receptions, 97 yards, 1 touchdown
- DAL – Jason Witten – 4 receptions, 48 yards

Top tacklers

- DET – Ndamukong Suh – 5 tackles, 3 sacks, 0.5 sack
- DAL – Keith Brooking – 7 tackles, 4 assists

The Cowboys' tenth game was an NFC duel with the Lions. In the first quarter the Cowboys pulled ahead with quarterback Jon Kitna making a 1-yard touchdown pass to wide receiver Dez Bryant. The Lions replied with kicker Dave Rayner nailing a 47-yard field goal. The Cowboys trailed with quarterback Shaun Hill making a 9-yard touchdown pass to wide receiver Nate Burleson, followed by a penalty on Leonard Davis which was enforced to the endzone for a safety. The Cowboys got the lead back with defensive back Bryan McCann returning a punt 97 yards for a touchdown, which was followed by Kitna making a 3-yard touchdown pass to wide receiver Miles Austin. The lead was narrowed with Hill completing a 14-yard touchdown pass to wide receiver Calvin Johnson. The Cowboys increased their lead with Kitna finding Austin again on a 4-yard touchdown pass, followed by Kitna's 29-yard scramble to the endzone for a touchdown, which was his longest run of his career.

Cowboys interim head coach Jason Garrett won his home debut and improved to 2–0 since taking over for Wade Phillips. It was the first time this season Dallas (3–7) had won consecutive games and the first time all season they won at home, having lost the first four. The Lions (2–8) lost their 26th straight on the road, extending a woeful NFL record that began in 2007, when Kitna was their quarterback. Detroit led 12–7 and was consistently stuffing the Cowboys' offense midway through the third quarter when John Wedling jumped over the goal line and tapped a punt back into the field of play. It hopped up waist-high and right to McCann, and the speedster turned it into the second-longest punt return in franchise history – a week after a 101-yard interception return that was the longest in club history. With the win the Cowboys improved to 3–7 on the season.

=== Week 12: vs. New Orleans Saints ===
Thanksgiving Day game

Week 12: New Orleans Saints at Dallas Cowboys – Game summary

Quarter	1	2	3	4	Total
Saints	17	3	3	7	30
Cowboys	0	6	14	7	27

at Cowboys Stadium, Arlington, Texas

- Game time: 4:15 PM EST (3:15 PM CST)
- Game weather: None (retractable roof closed)
- Game attendance: 93,985
- Referee: Jerome Boger
- TV announcers (Fox): Joe Buck, Troy Aikman, and Pam Oliver
- Recap

Game information

First quarter

- NO – Chris Ivory 3-yard run (Garrett Hartley kick), Saints 7–0, 'Drive: 4 plays, 80 yards, 1:51.
- NO – Garrett Hartley 50-yard field goal, Saints 10–0, 'Drive: 4 plays, −1 yards, 1:31.
- NO – Chris Ivory 6-yard run (Garrett Hartley kick), Saints 17–0, 'Drive: 6 plays, 58 yards, 2:59.

Second quarter

- DAL – David Buehler 21-yard field goal, Saints 17–3, 'Drive: 14 plays, 79 yards, 7:41.
- NO – Garrett Hartley 45-yard field goal, Saints 20–3, 'Drive: 13 plays, 54 yards, 4:30.
- DAL – David Buehler 53-yard field goal, Saints 20–6, 'Drive: 5 plays, 40 yards, 0:43.

Third quarter

- DAL – Miles Austin 60-yard run (David Buehler kick), Saints 20–13, 'Drive: 2 plays, 68 yards, 0:59.
- NO – Garrett Hartley 28-yard field goal, Saints 23–13, 'Drive: 11 plays, 70 yards, 4:31.
- DAL – Marion Barber 1-yard run (David Buehler kick), Saints 23–20, 'Drive: 6 plays, 15 yards, 2:55.

Fourth quarter

- DAL – Tashard Choice 1-yard run (David Buehler kick), Cowboys 27–23, 'Drive: 5 plays, 89 yards, 1:08.
- NO – Lance Moore 12-yard pass from Drew Brees (Garrett Hartley kick), Saints 30–27, 'Drive: 5 plays, 89 yards, 1:08.

Top passers

- NO – Drew Brees – 23/39, 352 yards, 1 touchdown, 1 interception
- DAL – Jon Kitna – 30/42, 313 yards, 1 interception

Top rushers

- NO – Julius Jones – 10 rushes, 45 yards
- DAL – Miles Austin – 1 rush, 60 yard, 1 touchdown

Top receivers

- NO – Marques Colston – 6 receptions, 105 yards
- DAL – Jason Witten – 10 receptions, 99 yards

Top tacklers

- NO – Jonathan Vilma – 8 tackles, 3 assists
- DAL – Terence Newman – 8 tackles

The Cowboys hosted the Saints in their annual Thanksgiving Day game. The Cowboys trailed early with running back Chris Ivory getting a 3-yard touchdown run, followed by kicker Garrett Hartley getting a 50-yard field goal, and then by Ivory making a 6-yard touchdown run. The Cowboys cut the lead as kicker David Buehler got a 21-yard field goal, but the Saints replied as Hartley nailed a 45-yard field goal. The Cowboys tried to come back as Buehler hit a 53-yard field goal, followed by Miles Austin getting a 60-yard touchdown run. The Cowboys trailed further with Hartley making a 28-yard field goal, but took the lead with Marion Barber III and Tashard Choice getting a 1-yard touchdown run. They failed to maintain this lead when quarterback Drew Brees completed a 12-yard touchdown pass to wide receiver Lance Moore.

With the loss, Dallas fell to 3–8.

=== Week 13: at Indianapolis Colts ===
Week 13: Dallas Cowboys at Indianapolis Colts – Game summary

Quarter	1	2	3	4	OT	Total
Cowboys	10	7	10	8	3	38
Colts	0	7	7	21	0	35

at Lucas Oil Stadium; Indianapolis, Indiana

- Date: December 5
- Game time: 4:15 PM EST
- Game weather: 4:15 PM EST
- Game attendance: 67,471
- Referee: Pete Morelli
- TV announcers (Fox): Joe Buck, Troy Aikman, and Pam Oliver
- Recap

Game information

First quarter

- DAL – Tashard Choice 20-yard run (David Buehler kick), Cowboys 7–0, Drive: 9 plays, 80 yards, 4:45.
- DAL – David Buehler 30-yard field goal, Cowboys 10–0, Drive: 12 plays, 72 yards, 6:40.

Second quarter

- DAL – Orlando Scandrick 40-yard interception return (David Buehler kick), Cowboys 17–0.
- IND – Pierre Garçon 13-yard pass from Peyton Manning (Adam Vinatieri kick), Cowboys 17–7, Drive: 15 plays, 86 yards, 8:15.

Third quarter

- IND – Reggie Wayne 34-yard pass from Peyton Manning (Adam Vinatieri kick), Cowboys 17–14, Drive: 4 plays, 80 yards, 1:07.
- DAL – David Buehler 46-yard field goal, Cowboys 20–14, Drive: 9 plays, 36 yards, 3:45.
- DAL – Sean Lee 31-yard interception return (David Buehler kick), Cowboys 27–14.

Fourth quarter

- IND – Javarris James 1-yard run (Adam Vinatieri kick), Cowboys 27–21, Drive: 10 plays, 80 yards, 4:57.
- IND – Taj Smith 2-yard return of blocked punt (Adam Vinatieri kick), Colts 28–27.
- DAL – Jason Witten 2-yard pass from Jon Kitna (Jon Kitna – Roy E. Williams pass), Cowboys 35–28, Drive: 18 plays, 81 yards, 10:18.
- IND – Javarris James 2-yard run (Adam Vinatieri kick), Tied 35–35, Drive: 10 plays, 81 yards, 2:09.

Overtime

- DAL – David Buehler 38-yard field goal, Cowboys 38–35,Drive: 6 plays, 16 yards, 3:16.

Top passers

- DAL – Jon Kitna – 18/26, 167 yards, 1 touchdown
- IND – Peyton Manning – 36/48, 365 yards, 2 touchdowns, 4 interceptions

Top rushers

- DAL – Tashard Choice – 19 rushes, 100 yards, 1 touchdown
- IND – Javarris James – 6 rushes, 18 yards, 2 touchdowns

Top receivers

- DAL – Miles Austin – 4 receptions, 47 yards
- IND – Reggie Wayne – 14 receptions, 200 yards, 1 touchdown

Top tacklers

- DAL – Mike Jenkins – 8 tackles, 1 assist
- IND – Antoine Bethea – 11 tackles, 4 assists

Hoping to rebound from their loss to the Super Bowl champion Saints, the Cowboys played against the Super Bowl runners-up Colts at Lucas Oil Stadium. The Cowboys commanded the first quarter when Tashard Choice got a 20-yard touchdown run, followed by kicker David Buehler nailing a 30-yard field goal. In the second quarter, the Cowboys increased their lead as cornerback Orlando Scandrick returned an interception 40 yards for a touchdown. The lead was narrowed when quarterback Peyton Manning made a 13-yard touchdown pass to wide receiver Pierre Garçon, followed in the third quarter by Manning getting a 34-yard touchdown pass to wide receiver Reggie Wayne. The Cowboys extended their lead with Buehler hitting a 46-yard field goal, followed by Sean Lee returning an interception 31 yards for a touchdown. They trailed slightly as RB Javarris James got a 1-yard touchdown run, followed by Mat McBriar's punt getting blocked and returned 2 yards for a touchdown by Taj Smith. They replied to get the lead back as quarterback Jon Kitna completed a 2-yard touchdown pass to tight end Jason Witten (With a successful 2-point conversion as Kitna passed to wide receiver Roy E. Williams), but the game was tied when James got a 2-yard touchdown run. In overtime, Manning threw his fourth interception, (which totalled 11 interceptions in three consecutive games.) to linebacker Sean Lee, which soon converted into a successful 38-yard field goal attempt by Buehler, giving the Cowboys the win.

With the win, the Cowboys improved to 4–8.

=== Week 14: vs. Philadelphia Eagles ===
Week 14: Philadelphia Eagles at Dallas Cowboys – Game summary

Quarter	1	2	3	4	Total
Eagles	7	7	3	13	30
Cowboys	7	3	10	7	27

at Cowboys Stadium, Arlington, Texas

- Game time: 8:20 PM EST (7:20 PM CST)
- Game weather: None (Dome Closed)
- Game attendance: 85,673
- Referee: Terry McAulay
- TV announcers (NBC): Al Michaels, Cris Collinsworth and Andrea Kremer
- Recap

Game information

First quarter

- PHI – Michael Vick 1-yard run (David Akers kick), Eagles 7–0, Drive: 6 plays, 73 yards, 3:13.
- DAL – Jason Witten 1-yard pass from Jon Kitna (David Buehler kick), Tied 7–7, Drive: 10 plays, 77 yards, 6:14.

Second quarter

- PHI – Todd Herremans 2-yard pass from Michael Vick (David Akers kick), Eagles 14–7, Drive: 6 plays, 51 yards, 3:00.
- DAL – David Buehler 50-yard field goal, Eagles 14–10, Drive: 7 plays, 36 yards, 1:34.

Third quarter

- DAL – David Buehler 43-yard field goal, Eagles 14–13, Drive: 10 plays, 42 yards, 4:42.
- DAL – Felix Jones 3-yard run (David Buehler kick), Cowboys 20–14, Drive: 3 plays, 37 yards, 1:34.
- PHI – David Akers 39-yard field goal, Cowboys 20–17, Drive: 5 plays, 56 yards, 2:38.

Fourth quarter

- PHI – David Akers 50-yard field goal, Tied 20–20, Drive: 10 plays, 28 yards, 4:18.
- PHI – DeSean Jackson 91-yard pass from Michael Vick, Eagles 27–20, Drive: 1 plays, 91 yards, 0:19.
- PHI – David Akers 28-yard field goal, Eagles 30–20, Drive: 5 plays, 22 yards, 2:54.
- DAL – Jason Witten 22-yard pass from Jon Kitna (David Buehler kick), Eagles 30–27, Drive: 9 plays, 80 yards, 3:55.

Top passers

- PHI – Michael Vick – 16/26, 270 yards, 2 touchdowns, 2 interceptions
- DAL – Jon Kitna – 24/35, 242 yards, 2 touchdowns, 2 interceptions

Top rushers

- PHI – LeSean McCoy – 16 rushes, 149 yards
- DAL – Felix Jones – 13 rushes, 41 yards, 1 touchdown

Top receivers

- PHI – DeSean Jackson – 4 receptions, 210 yards, 1 touchdown
- DAL – Jason Witten – 7 receptions, 69 yards, 2 touchdowns

Top tacklers

- PHI – Jamar Chaney – 5 tackles, 2 assists
- DAL – Terence Newman – 7 tackles

Coming off their win over the Colts, the Cowboys went home for a Week 14 NFC East duel with the Philadelphia Eagles on Sunday night. Dallas trailed early in the first quarter as Eagles quarterback Michael Vick got a 1-yard touchdown run. The Cowboys answered with quarterback Jon Kitna finding tight end Jason Witten on a 1-yard touchdown pass. The Eagles regained the lead in the second quarter with Vick completing a 1-yard touchdown pass to offensive guard Todd Herremans. Afterwards, Dallas closed out the half with a 50-yard field goal from kicker David Buehler.

The Cowboys took the lead in the third quarter with Buehler's 43-yard field goal, followed by a 3-yard touchdown run from running back Felix Jones. Philadelphia struck back with kicker David Akers getting a 39-yard field goal. The Eagles took the lead again in the fourth quarter with Akers booting a 50-yard field goal, followed by Vick completing a 91-yard touchdown pass to wide receiver DeSean Jackson and Akers making a 28-yard field goal. Dallas tried to rally as Kitna hooked up with Witten again on a 22-yard touchdown pass, yet the Eagles held on for the win.

With the loss, the Cowboys clinched their first losing season since 2004 and fell to 4–9. Also with this loss, they were eliminated from playoff contention.

=== Week 15: vs. Washington Redskins ===
Week 15: Washington Redskins at Dallas Cowboys – Game summary

Quarter	1	2	3	4	Total
Redskins	0	7	7	16	30
Cowboys	10	10	10	3	33

at Cowboys Stadium, Arlington, Texas

- Game time: 1:00 PM EST (12:00 PM CST)
- Game weather: 51 °F (11 °C) (Roof open)
- Game attendance: 86,904
- Referee: Alberto Riveron
- TV announcers (Fox): Kenny Albert, Daryl Johnston and Tony Siragusa
- Recap

Game information

First quarter

- DAL – David Buehler 42-yard field goal, Cowboys 3–0, Drive: 8 plays, 30 yards, 4:14.
- DAL – Miles Austin 3-yard pass from Jon Kitna (David Buehler kick), Cowboys 10–0, Drive: 4 plays, 27 yards, 1:34.

Second quarter

- DAL – David Buehler 20-yard field goal, Cowboys 13–0, Drive: 9 plays, 33 yards, 4:27.
- WAS – Ryan Torain 19-yard pass from Rex Grossman (Graham Gano kick), Cowboys 13–7, Drive: 8 plays, 78 yards, 3:15.
- DAL – Jason Witten 14-yard pass from Jon Kitna (David Buehler kick), Cowboys 20–7, Drive: 9 plays, 91 yards, 5:51.

Third quarter

- DAL – Tashard Choice 3-yard run (David Buehler kick), Cowboys 27–7, Drive: 5 plays, 15 yards, 2:04.
- WAS – Santana Moss 10-yard pass from Rex Grossman (Graham Gano kick), Cowboys 27–14, Drive: 4 plays, 71 yards, 2:17.
- DAL – David Buehler 20-yard field goal, Cowboys 30–14, Drive: 10 plays, 80 yards, 5:23.

Fourth quarter

- WAS – Santana Moss 5-yard pass from Rex Grossman (Rex Grossman – Chris Cooley pass), Cowboys 30–22, Drive: 14 plays, 78 yards, 5:42.
- WAS – Chris Cooley 5-yard pass from Rex Grossman (Rex Grossman – Mike Sellers pass), Tied 30–30, Drive: 8 plays, 56 yards, 4:03.
- DAL – David Buehler 39-yard field goal, Cowboys 33–30, Drive: 7 plays, 31 yards, 2:21.

Top passers

- WAS – Rex Grossman – 25/43, 322 yards, 4 touchdowns, 2 interceptions
- DAL – Jon Kitna – 25/37, 305 yards, 2 touchdowns

Top rushers

- WAS – Ryan Torain – 11 rushes, 53 yards
- DAL – Felix Jones – 12 rushes, 70 yards

Top receivers

- WAS – Anthony Armstrong – 5 receptions, 100 yards
- DAL – Jason Witten – 10 receptions, 140 yards, 1 touchdown

Top tacklers

- WAS – London Fletcher – 7 tackles, 4 assists
- DAL – DeMarcus Ware – 6 tackles, 2 sacks, 1 forced fumble

The Cowboys' fourteenth game was an NFC East rivalry rematch against the Redskins at home. In the first quarter the Cowboys took the lead with kicker David Buehler hitting a 42-yard field goal, followed by quarterback Jon Kitna throwing a 3-yard touchdown pass to wide receiver Miles Austin; then Buehler made a 20-yard field goal to put Dallas up 13–0. The lead was narrowed when quarterback Rex Grossman completed a 19-yard touchdown pass to running back Ryan Torain, but the Cowboys increased their lead with Kitna making a 14-yard touchdown pass to tight end Jason Witten, followed by running back Tashard Choice getting a 3-yard touchdown run. The Redskins replied with Grossman getting a 10-yard touchdown pass to wide receiver Santana Moss, but the Cowboys scored again with Buehler got a 20-yard field goal. Washington managed to tie the game with Grossman finding Moss on a 5-yard touchdown pass. The Cowboys managed to get the win after Buehler made a 39-yard field goal, settling both records at 5–9.

=== Week 16: at Arizona Cardinals ===
Week 16: Dallas Cowboys at Arizona Cardinals – Game summary

Quarter	1	2	3	4	Total
Cowboys	0	10	10	6	26
Cardinals	14	7	0	6	27

at University of Phoenix Stadium, Glendale, Arizona

- Game time: 7:30 PM EST (6:30 PM CST)
- Game weather: None (retractable roof closed)
- Game attendance: 66,971
- Referee: Jeff Triplette
- TV announcers (NFL Network): Bob Papa, Matt Millen and Joe Theismann
- Recap

Game information

First quarter

- ARI – Dominique Rodgers-Cromartie 32-yard interception return (Jay Feely kick), Cardinals 7–0.
- ARI – Greg Toler 66-yard interception return (Jay Feely kick), Cardinals 14–0.

Second quarter

- DAL – David Buehler 42-yard field goal, Cardinals 14–3, Drive: 10 plays, 37 yards, 4:56.
- ARI – Andre Roberts 74-yard pass from John Skelton (Jay Feely kick), Cardinals 21–3, Drive: 2 plays, 80 yards, 0:52.
- DAL – Jason Witten 2-yard pass from Jon Kitna (David Buehler kick), Cardinals 21–10, Drive: 13 plays, 81 yards, 6:46.

Third quarter

- DAL – David Buehler 53-yard field goal, Cardinals 21–13, Drive: 5 plays, 26 yards, 1:59.
- DAL – Marion Barber 24-yard run (David Buehler kick), Cardinals 21–20, Drive: 6 plays, 47 yards, 3:42.

Fourth quarter

- ARI – Jay Feely 49-yard field goal, Cardinals 24–20, Drive: 9 plays, 49 yards, 5:05.
- DAL – Miles Austin 37-yard pass from Stephen McGee (David Buehler kick failed), Cowboys 26–24, Drive: 8 plays, 80 yards, 2:04.
- ARI – Jay Feely 48-yard field goal, Cardinals 27–26, Drive: 9 plays, 46 yards, 1:36.

Top passers

- DAL – Jon Kitna – 12/20, 115 yards, 1 touchdown, 2 interceptions
- ARI – John Skelton – 11/25, 183 yards, 1 touchdown

Top rushers

- DAL – Felix Jones – 16 rushes, 77 yards
- ARI – Beanie Wells – 11 rushes, 47 yards

Top receivers

- DAL – Miles Austin – 6 receptions, 115 yards, 1 touchdown
- ARI – Andre Roberts – 5 receptions, 110 yards, 1 touchdown

Top tacklers

- DAL – Bradie James, Anthony Spencer – 5 tackles
- ARI – Daryl Washington – 8 tackles, 1 forced fumble

With the loss, the Cowboys fell to 5–10.

=== Week 17: at Philadelphia Eagles ===
Week 17: Dallas Cowboys at Philadelphia Eagles – Game summary

Quarter	1	2	3	4	Total
Cowboys	0	7	0	7	14
Eagles	0	7	0	6	13

at Lincoln Financial Field, Philadelphia, Pennsylvania

- Game time: 4:15 p.m. EST (3:15 p.m. CST)
- Game weather: Mostly Cloudy, 41 °F (5 °C), Light Drizzle
- Referee: Tony Corrente
- TV announcers (Fox): Kenny Albert, Daryl Johnston and Tony Siragusa

Game information

First quarter

Second quarter

Third quarter

Fourth quarter

Top passers

Top rushers

Top receivers

Top tacklers

The Cowboys' final game was an NFC East rivalry rematch against the Eagles. In the 2nd quarter the Cowboys trailed early as quarterback Kevin Kolb threw a 4-yard touchdown pass to wide receiver Chad Hall, but they tied the game after outside linebackrt DeMarcus Ware recovered a fumble 17 yards for a touchdown. They trailed slightly with kicker David Akers hitting a 43 and a 22-yard field goal, but the Cowboys fought back with quarterback Stephen McGee completing a 4-yard touchdown pass to tight end Jason Witten (with the extra point good to take the lead and the win).

With the win, Dallas finished with a 6–10 record.
