= Brian McCann =

Brian McCann may refer to:

- Brian McCann (actor) (born 1965), American writer, actor, and comedian
- Brian McCann (baseball) (born 1984), baseball player

== See also ==
- Bryan McCann (born 1987), American football player
