= Stillwater High School =

Stillwater High School may refer to:

- Stillwater High School (Oklahoma) — Stillwater, Oklahoma
- Stillwater Area High School — Stillwater, Minnesota
- Stillwater High School (New York) — Stillwater, New York
