= Miles Austin =

American football player and coach (born 1984)

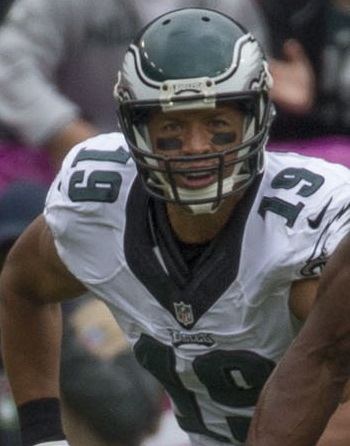
- Austin with the Philadelphia Eagles in 2015

No. 14, 19
- Position: Wide receiver

Personal information
- Born: June 30, 1984 (age 42); Summit, New Jersey, U.S.
- Listed height: 6 ft 2 in (1.88 m)
- Listed weight: 215 lb (98 kg)

Career information
- High school: Garfield (Garfield, New Jersey)
- College: Monmouth (2002–2005)
- NFL draft: 2006: undrafted

Career history

Playing
- Dallas Cowboys (2006–2013); Cleveland Browns (2014); Philadelphia Eagles (2015)

Coaching
- San Francisco 49ers (2019) Offensive quality control coach; New York Jets (2021–2022) Wide receivers coach

Operations
- Dallas Cowboys (2017–2018) Pro & college scouting intern

Awards and highlights
- 2× Pro Bowl (2009, 2010)

Career NFL statistics
- Receptions: 361
- Receiving yards: 5,273
- Receiving touchdowns: 37
- Stats at Pro Football Reference

Miles Jonathon Austin III (born June 30, 1984) is an American professional football coach and former wide receiver who played in the National Football League (NFL) for 10 seasons, primarily with the Dallas Cowboys. He played college football for the Monmouth Hawks, setting the school's record for receiving yards.

Signed by the Cowboys as an undrafted free agent in 2006, Austin spent eight seasons with the team and received two consecutive Pro Bowl selections. His most successful season was in 2009 when he led the National Football Conference (NFC) in receiving yards and set the Cowboys' single game receiving yards record. In his final two seasons, Austin was a member of the Cleveland Browns and Philadelphia Eagles. He pursued a coaching career following his retirement, serving as an offensive assistant with the San Francisco 49ers and New York Jets from 2019 to 2022.

== Early life ==
Austin was born in Summit, New Jersey to parents Miles, an African-American, and mother Ann Austin, a Caucasian, who were born in New Jersey and Nebraska, respectively. He has one sister, Jennifer Austin. Austin grew up in Garfield, New Jersey and attended Garfield High School. He was a letterman in football, basketball, and track and field. In football, he played wide receiver and defensive back, and as a senior, he won All-Bergen County honors and All-State honors. In basketball, Austin garnered All-Bergen County honors as well.

Also a standout athlete, Austin was on the school's track & field team, where he was a top competitor in the sprinting, jumping and throwing events. He recorded the third-longest javelin throw in Bergen County history, with a throw of 65.44 meters. He placed third in the triple jump event at the 2001 New Jersey Meet of Champions, with a leap of 13.35 meters. He got a personal-best leap of 6.81 meters in the long jump. In sprints, he had career-best times of 10.8 seconds in the 100 meters and 22.28 seconds in the 200 meters.

== College career ==
Austin played college football for the Monmouth Hawks football team. He caught 150 passes for 2,867 yards and 33 touchdowns. He left the school as the record-holder in receiving yards, which has since been broken by Reggie White Jr.

Austin rushed 15 times for 140 yards and one touchdown. In 2003, he set a Monmouth single-season record for touchdown catches with 12. He ran 4.47 second 40-yard dash and jumped 40.5 inches in the vertical leap at the 2006 NFL combine.

In 2016, Austin was inducted into the Monmouth University Athletics Hall of Fame.

== Professional career ==
Pre-draft measurables
Height	Weight	Arm length	Hand span	40-yard dash	10-yard split	20-yard split	20-yard shuttle	Three-cone drill	Vertical jump	Broad jump	Bench press
6 ft 2 1/8 in (1.88 m)	215 lb (98 kg)	31 in (0.79 m)	10 in (0.25 m)	4.49 s	1.57 s	2.61 s	4.14 s	7.09 s	40.5 in (1.03 m)	10 ft 3 in (3.12 m)	21 reps
All values from NFL Combine

=== Dallas Cowboys ===
==== 2006 season ====
Austin was signed as an undrafted free agent in 2006 by the Dallas Cowboys, making him the first player from Monmouth to appear in the NFL. He made the team based on his potential and was used mainly on special teams, returning 29 kickoffs for 753 yards and recorded 5 tackles. His main highlight of the year was in the Cowboys playoff game against the Seattle Seahawks. He returned 3 kickoffs for 136 yards in the game, including a 93-yard touchdown return. In the 55 postseason games in franchise history, it was the Cowboys' first ever kickoff return touchdown.

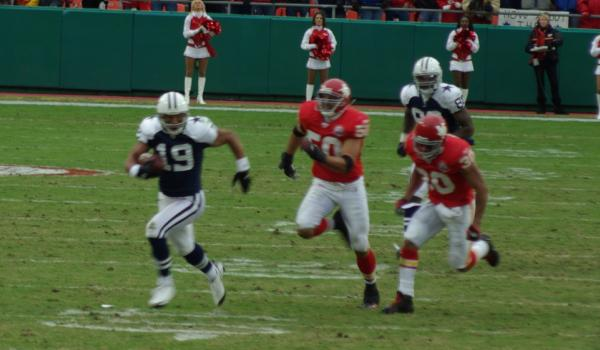
Austin (#19), running away from Mike Vrabel (#50) and Mike Brown (#30), against the Kansas City Chiefs in 2009.

==== 2007 season ====
Austin was the team's main kickoff returner, ranking third in the NFC and ninth in the league with a 25.5 average on 24 attempts for 612 yards. He set career-highs with six kickoff returns for 166 yards against the Green Bay Packers. He also recorded his first career reception against the New York Jets.

==== 2008 season ====
Austin had a strong training camp and was contending for the starting position that was open with the departure of Terry Glenn, until spraining his knee in the second preseason game against the Denver Broncos. After missing some games with the injury, he exploded against the Green Bay Packers registering 115 yards on two catches for his first career 100-yard game and first touchdown. He suffered a second knee injury against the Washington Redskins and missed three games.

==== 2009 season ====
With the release of Terrell Owens, Austin started the regular season as the Cowboys' No. 3 receiver. During free agency, the New York Jets looked at Austin but did not offer him a contract, possibly because they would have had to give the Cowboys a second-round draft pick in order to sign him. Before the year, Football Outsiders rated Austin as the top prospect in football on their Top 25 Prospects list.

Austin got his first NFL start on October 11, 2009, against the Kansas City Chiefs, as a replacement for injured Roy Williams. Austin had 10 catches for 250 yards (a Cowboys record for receiving yards in a single game, breaking Bob Hayes' 246-yard effort in 1966 against the Washington Redskins) and 2 touchdowns including the 60-yard game winner in overtime. Austin made his second career start on October 25 against the Atlanta Falcons replacing Patrick Crayton as the No. 2 receiver. Austin solidified his place as a starting receiver with 171 receiving yards along with 2 touchdowns. After only two weeks as a starting wide receiver, Austin was the ninth-most productive receiver in the league going into Week 8, and moved up to eighth just four weeks later having caught his 8th touchdown against the Oakland Raiders on Thanksgiving Day. Against the Giants in week 13 he had 10 catches for 104 yards and a touchdown.

December 29, 2009, Austin was selected to the 2010 Pro Bowl, his first. He went on to lead the NFC (third overall in the NFL) with 1320 receiving yards for the 2009 season. He also tied for first in the NFC with 11 receiving touchdowns which was tied for third in the NFL for receiving touchdowns in only starting 11 games in the 2009 season.

==== 2010 season ====
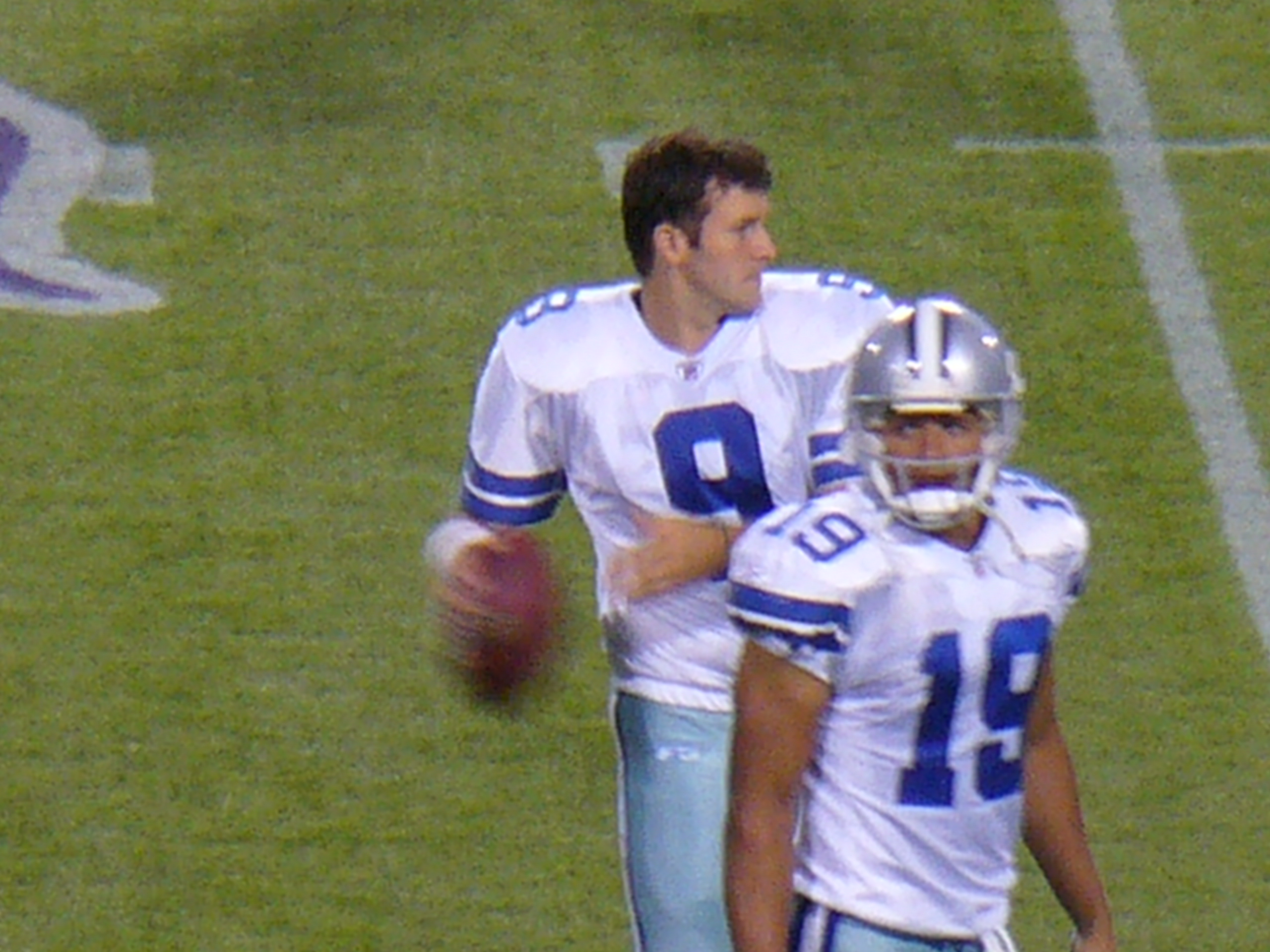
Austin (bottom) and Tony Romo.

On September 9, 2010, Austin agreed to a six-year contract extension that began in 2011. The deal included $17 million in guaranteed salary. He signed a $3.168 million contract in June 2010 and his extension was worth $54 million, which brought the total value of his contract to $57 million. The team paid a very high first year salary ($17 million), by taking advantage that the NFL collective bargaining agreement wasn't renewed, and in the final year of the agreement there was no salary cap system in place. Even though the NFL initially approved the contract, in 2013 commissioner Roger Goodell would penalize the Cowboys by taking $10 million from the team's original $120.6 million salary cap space.

With 10 catches in each of the first two games of the 2010 season, Austin became the second player in Cowboys history to record double-digit catches in consecutive weeks. On Thanksgiving Day, he scored a 60-yard touchdown on an end-around. However, the Cowboys lost 30–27 to the New Orleans Saints.

He finished the season with 69 catches for 1,041 yards and 7 touchdowns. He made his second consecutive Pro Bowl in 2010, replacing DeSean Jackson who sprained his MCL during practice for the Pro Bowl. He was ranked 70th by his fellow players on the NFL Top 100 Players of 2011.

==== 2011 season ====
Austin's 2011 season started well with a 5-catch, 90-yard performance in week 1, followed by a career-best mark for touchdowns in a game with 3 to go along with 9 catches for 143 yards in a week 2 victory over the San Francisco 49ers.

In week 14 while playing against the New York Giants to secure the division title and a playoff spot, he lost in the lights of Cowboys Stadium a first down pass from Tony Romo that would have won the game for the Cowboys, who ended losing 34–37 and eventually missing the playoffs.

Austin's 2011 season was marred by nagging hamstring injuries which caused him to miss 6 games and limited him to his lowest reception, touchdown, and yardage output since the 2008 season.

==== 2012 season ====
After having a disappointing season, Austin started 2012 with 4 receptions for 73 yards while also grabbing a key touchdown in the 4th quarter of a 24–17 upset win over the Super Bowl defending champions New York Giants. The next game was a surprise defeat to the Seattle Seahawks, where he had 5 receptions for 63 yards while also grabbing a touchdown. The next week, in a victory over the Tampa Bay Buccaneers, Austin had 5 receptions for 107 yards. In the fourth game against the Chicago Bears, he had 4 receptions for 57 yards while also grabbing a touchdown in a losing effort caused by the Cowboys' 5 interceptions. He bounced back with 5 receptions for 97 yards with a touchdown in a victory over the Carolina Panthers. In a Week 13 win over the Philadelphia Eagles, he had 2 receptions for 46 yards with a touchdown. Austin's multiple injuries and the emergence of Dez Bryant as the Cowboys' leading wide receiver, hurt his chances of reaching 1,000 yards, but still had a productive year with 943 receiving yards, 66 receptions and 6 touchdowns.

==== 2013 season ====
Austin looked to bounce back in 2013. After a Week 1 performance with 10 receptions and 72 receiving yards in a victory over the New York Giants, in the next two weeks, he would be held to 5 receptions and 53 receiving yards, while suffering a hamstring injury in the third game. After being shut down by the team in an effort to return him to health, he did not have another reception until a Week 12 victory over the New York Giants. In that game, Austin had one reception for 17 yards followed by another discouraging performance in a Thanksgiving victory over the Oakland Raiders, with one reception for 18 yards. His season would end up being a disappointment after missing five games with a left hamstring injury, never displaying his explosive speed and being held without a reception in two games. Austin finished with his lowest receiving numbers since his second year in the league and his future with the team at risk, taking into account his history of hamstring injuries and rookie Terrance Williams playing well in his absence.

On March 11, 2014, it was announced that Austin had been designated as a post-June 1 release, ending his tenure as a Dallas Cowboy.

=== Cleveland Browns ===
Needing to improve their depth at wide receiver after Josh Gordon's suspension, the Cleveland Browns signed him as a free agent on May 15, 2014. He asked for and received permission from former Browns quarterback Bernie Kosar to wear number 19, since the number had not been officially retired. Aside from Frisman Jackson briefly wearing 19 in 2004, the number hadn't been issued by the Browns since Bill Belichick controversially cut Kosar in the middle of the 1993 season. Austin became the leader of a young wide receiver corps and filled the possession receiver role, before being placed on the injured reserve list with a kidney injury on December 3.

=== Philadelphia Eagles ===
On March 31, 2015, Austin and the Philadelphia Eagles agreed to terms on a one-year deal worth $2.3 million. Austin, who was projected to have a big role in a young and inexperienced wide receiver corps, was held to 13 catches for 224 yards and 1 touchdown in 11 games. He had some moments, such as a 39-yard catch and run for a touchdown against the Redskins, but he was still criticized for not producing, as he was held to 0 catches in 5 different games, with a season high of 4 catches for 52 yards. On December 7, 2015, Austin was released by the Eagles.

== NFL career statistics ==
=== Regular season ===
Year	Team	Games		Receiving					Rushing					Fumbles	
Year	Team	GP	GS	Rec	Yds	Avg	Lng	TD	Att	Yds	Avg	Lng	TD	Fum	Lost
2006	DAL	9	0	0	0	0.0	0	0	0	0	0.0	0	0	3	1
2007	DAL	16	0	5	76	15.2	35	0	0	0	0.0	0	0	0	0
2008	DAL	12	0	13	278	21.4	63	3	0	0	0.0	0	0	2	0
2009	DAL	16	9	81	1,320	16.3	60	11	2	-2	-1.0	11	0	1	0
2010	DAL	16	16	69	1,041	15.1	69	7	7	93	13.3	60	1	1	1
2011	DAL	10	10	43	579	13.5	53	7	2	3	1.5	5	0	1	0
2012	DAL	16	15	66	943	14.3	49	6	0	0	0.0	0	0	1	1
2013	DAL	11	8	24	244	10.2	20	0	0	0	0.0	0	0	0	0
2014	CLE	12	11	47	568	12.1	31	2	0	0	0.0	0	0	0	0
2015	PHI	11	1	13	224	17.2	39	1	0	0	0.0	0	0	0	0
Total		129	70	361	5,273	14.6	69	37	11	94	8.5	60	1	9	3

=== Postseason ===
Year	Team	Games		Receiving					Rushing					Fumbles	
Year	Team	GP	GS	Rec	Yds	Avg	Lng	TD	Att	Yds	Avg	Lng	TD	Fum	Lost
2006	DAL	1	0	0	0	0.0	0	0	0	0	0.0	0	0	0	0
2007	DAL	1	0	0	0	0.0	0	0	0	0	0.0	0	0	0	0
2009	DAL	2	2	11	116	10.5	36	1	1	8	8.0	8	0	0	0
Total		4	2	11	116	10.5	36	1	1	8	8.0	8	0	0	0

== Coaching career ==
=== Dallas Cowboys ===
In 2017, Austin was hired by the Dallas Cowboys as a pro and college scouting intern. He described his role as an "advanced scout" who evaluated receivers and defensive backs. In January 2018, Austin was interviewed for a role as the Cowboys wide receivers coach, which eventually went to Sanjay Lal.

=== San Francisco 49ers ===
On February 27, 2019, Austin was hired by the San Francisco 49ers as an offensive quality control coach. He was on the team's coaching staff when they advanced to Super Bowl LIV. After the 49ers' loss to the Kansas City Chiefs, Austin departed from his role in 2020.

=== New York Jets ===
On January 18, 2021, Austin was hired by the New York Jets as their wide receivers coach. The hire reunited Austin with head coach Robert Saleh, who was the 49ers' defensive coordinator while Austin was with San Francisco.

Near the end of the 2022 season, Austin was indefinitely suspended for violating the NFL's gambling policy. Austin is appealing the suspension.

== Personal life ==
Austin briefly dated Kim Kardashian in 2010. In 2014, Austin married his wife, Stacy Sydlo, whom he had met at Monmouth. They have three children together.

Austin returned to Monmouth University in 2018 to complete his college education. He graduated the following year with a degree in political science. In 2020, Austin was elected to serve on Monmouth's board of trustees.

Austin established the non-profit organization "The Austin Family Foundation Inc." Their goal is to help provide student athletes with the opportunity to realize and fulfill their potential.
