= Kevin Brock (American football) =

American football player (born 1986)

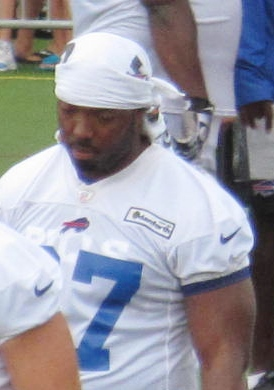
- Brock with the Buffalo Bills at 2012 training camp at St. John Fisher College

No. 87, 46, 83
- Position: Tight end

Personal information
- Born: April 9, 1986 (age 40); Hackensack, New Jersey, U.S.
- Listed height: 6 ft 5 in (1.96 m)
- Listed weight: 315 lb (143 kg)

Career information
- College: Rutgers
- NFL draft: 2009: undrafted

Career history
- Carolina Panthers (2009)*; New York Jets (2009)*; Pittsburgh Steelers (2009)*; Chicago Bears (2009–2010)*; Dallas Cowboys (2010)*; Oakland Raiders (2010–2011)*; Buffalo Bills (2011); Kansas City Chiefs (2013); Cincinnati Bengals (2013–2014); New Orleans Saints (2015)
- * Offseason or practice squad member only

Career NFL statistics
- Receptions: 10
- Receiving yards: 84
- Stats at Pro Football Reference

Kevin Brock (born April 9, 1986) is an American former professional football player who was a tight end in the National Football League (NFL). He was signed by the Carolina Panthers as an undrafted free agent in 2009. He played college football for the Rutgers Scarlet Knights.

He was also a member of the New York Jets, Pittsburgh Steelers, Chicago Bears, Dallas Cowboys, Oakland Raiders, Buffalo Bills, Kansas City Chiefs and Cincinnati Bengals.

== Professional career ==
=== Carolina Panthers ===
After going undrafted in the 2009 NFL draft, Brock signed with the Carolina Panthers. He was waived on August 2, 2009.

=== New York Jets ===
A day after being waived by Carolina, Brock was claimed by the New York Jets. He was released on September 4.

=== Pittsburgh Steelers ===
Brock was signed to the Pittsburgh Steelers' practice squad on September 16, 2009. He was waived on November 2, 2009.

=== Chicago Bears ===
The Chicago Bears signed Brock to their practice squad on November 24, 2009. On January 4, 2010, he was re-signed to a future contract. He was waived on May 24, 2010.

=== Dallas Cowboys ===
Two days after being waived by Chicago, Brock was signed by the Dallas Cowboys. When the Cowboys suffered injuries to three tight ends, John Phillips, Scott Sicko, and Brock, they needed to sign another tight end. To make room, they waived Brock. He cleared waivers and reverted to Injured Reserve. He reached an injury settlement with the Cowboys on August 25, 2010.

=== Oakland Raiders ===
Brock was signed to the Oakland Raiders' practice squad on September 6, 2010.

=== Kansas City Chiefs ===
Brock was signed to the Kansas City Chiefs' roster on September 16, 2013. He was waived on October 29, 2013.

=== Cincinnati Bengals ===
Brock was signed to the Cincinnati Bengals' roster on December 31, 2013. The Bengals waived Brock on August 26, 2014. He was later re-signed by the Bengals. He was released May 10, 2015.
