= Bryan McCann =

American football player (born 1987)

No. 23, 32, 37
- Position: Cornerback

Personal information
- Born: September 29, 1987 (age 39); Lawton, Oklahoma, U.S.
- Listed height: 5 ft 10 in (1.78 m)
- Listed weight: 182 lb (83 kg)

Career information
- High school: Putnam City (OK)
- College: SMU
- NFL draft: 2010: undrafted

Career history
- Dallas Cowboys (2010)*; Baltimore Ravens (2010); Dallas Cowboys (2010–2011); Baltimore Ravens (2011); Oakland Raiders (2011); Miami Dolphins (2012); Arizona Cardinals (2013); Washington Redskins (2015)*
- * Offseason or practice squad member only

Awards and highlights
- All-Freshman Conference USA (2006)

Career NFL statistics
- Total tackles: 31
- Sacks: 1
- Fumble recoveries: 2
- Interceptions: 1
- Return yards: 1,154
- Total touchdowns: 2
- Stats at Pro Football Reference

Bryan McCann (born September 29, 1987) is an American former professional football player who was a cornerback in the National Football League (NFL). He was signed by the Dallas Cowboys as an undrafted free agent in 2010. He played college football for the SMU Mustangs.

== Early life ==
McCann was born in Lawton, Oklahoma and attended Putnam City High School, where he lettered in football, basketball and track. As a senior, he was rated as the 20th-best player in Oklahoma (Rivals.com), but broke his left leg and was only able to play in 3 games, managing to help his team finish a 10–2 season and reach the state quarterfinals. He turned down offers to play for Oklahoma State, Stanford, Northwestern, Texas Tech, Tulsa, UAB, and Rice, choosing to play for Southern Methodist University instead.

== College career ==
McCann was an All-Freshman Conference USA selection, after having 38 tackles, 4 passes defensed, one interception and appearing in 11 games, starting three of the last four. He was the co-winner of the James Bradley "New Mustang" award for consistent play, along with Emmanuel Sanders and Justin Willis. The next year, he started all 12 games, posting 59 tackles, 7 passes defensed and 4 interceptions, while playing at both corner and safety.

As a junior, he started 11 games, registering 35 tackles, 3 interceptions, one sack and 6 punt returns for 31 yards. As a senior, he had 54 tackles, 3 interceptions and 34 kickoff returns for 824 yards.

== Professional career ==
=== Dallas Cowboys (first stint) ===
After going undrafted in the 2010 NFL draft, McCann was signed as a free agent by the Dallas Cowboys. He was released at the end of training camp.

=== Baltimore Ravens (first stint) ===
On September 5, 2010, McCann was claimed off waivers by the Baltimore Ravens. He was cut after one game, which he was inactive for.

=== Dallas Cowboys (second stint) ===
McCann was re-signed to the Cowboys practice squad on September 16, 2010. He was promoted to the active roster on November 4, 2010, because of injuries to the starting cornerbacks.

In his second NFL game, he recorded his first career interception on November 14, 2010 against the New York Giants, picking off Eli Manning after Hakeem Nicks stopped short on an intended slant route. The interception was returned for a 101-yard touchdown. It broke the Cowboys record of 100-yards once held by Mike Gaechter. McCann’s 101-yard return was tied for the second longest in Cowboys history. He also became the second rookie in the Super Bowl era to score on a 100-plus yard interception return, the other one was Louis Delmas. For his efforts, he was named NFC Defensive Player of the Week.

The next game against the Detroit Lions on November 21, he grabbed a batted-down punt and returned it for a 97-yard touchdown, which was the second longest punt return in franchise history; only Dennis Morgan’s 98-yard return in 1974 was longer. With this touchdown McCann became the first rookie in NFL history to score a touchdown of 97+ yards in consecutive weeks. For his efforts his was named NFC Special Teams Player of the Week and the Pepsi NFL Rookie of the Week. He was also the first player in franchise history to win Player of the Week honors in two different categories in the same season, and the first since Troy Aikman, in 1993, to win it in consecutive weeks.

On September 20, 2011, because of injuries to their starting wide receivers, the Cowboys waived him to re-sign Laurent Robinson.

=== Baltimore Ravens (second stint) ===
On October 4, 2011, he was re-signed by the Baltimore Ravens. He was released again on November 5, 2011.

=== Oakland Raiders ===
On November 17, 2011, he was signed by the Oakland Raiders to replace an injured Chimdi Chekwa. He was one of the last cuts the Raiders made before the start of the 2012 season.

=== Miami Dolphins ===
On November 6, 2012, he was signed by the Miami Dolphins. The team didn't re-sign McCann at the end of the season.

=== Arizona Cardinals ===
On April 4, 2013 he was signed by the Arizona Cardinals. He was released on September 1 and later re-signed on November 19. McCann was re-signed on March 19, 2014. He was cut on August 30.

=== Washington Redskins ===
McCann signed with the Washington Redskins on August 5, 2015. He was waived on August 31.

=== NFL statistics ===
Year	Team	GP	COMB	TOTAL	AST	SACK	FF	FR	FR YDS	INT	IR YDS	AVG IR	LNG	TD	PD
2010	DAL	9	15	14	1	0.0	0	0	0	1	101	101	101	1	1
2011	DAL	2	0	0	0	0.0	0	0	0	0	0	0	0	0	1
2011	OAK	7	3	2	1	0.0	0	0	0	0	0	0	0	0	0
2011	BAL	3	1	0	1	0.0	0	0	0	0	0	0	0	0	0
2012	MIA	8	10	10	0	1.0	0	0	0	0	0	0	0	0	1
2013	ARI	6	2	2	0	0.0	0	0	0	0	0	0	0	0	0
Career		35	31	28	3	1.0	0	0	0	1	101	101	101	1	3
