= David Buehler =

American football player (born 1987)

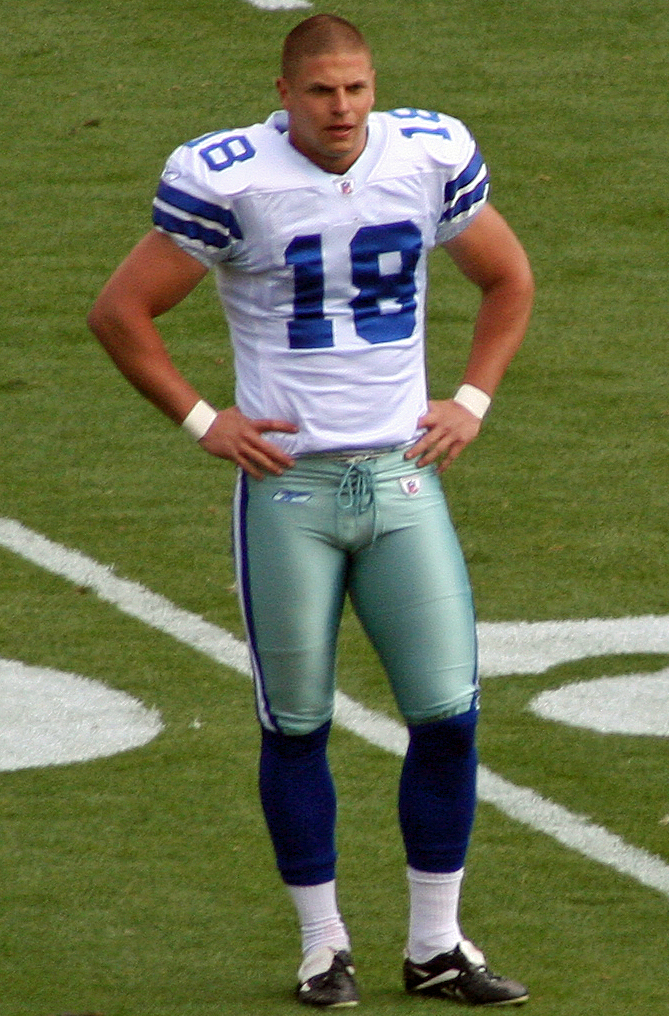
- Buehler with the Dallas Cowboys in 2009

No. 18
- Positions: Placekicker, kickoff specialist

Personal information
- Born: February 5, 1987 (age 39); Northridge, California, U.S.
- Listed height: 6 ft 2 in (1.88 m)
- Listed weight: 227 lb (103 kg)

Career information
- High school: Canyon (Anaheim, California)
- College: Santa Ana (2005); USC (2006–2008)
- NFL draft: 2009: 5th round, 172nd overall pick

Career history
- Dallas Cowboys (2009−2011); New York Giants (2013)*
- * Offseason or practice squad member only

Awards and highlights
- First-team All-Pac-10 (2008)

Career NFL statistics
- Games played: 36
- Field goals made: 24
- Field goals attempted: 32
- Field goal %: 75
- Longest field goal: 53
- Kickoffs: 179
- Stats at Pro Football Reference

David Jonathan Buehler (born February 5, 1987) is an American former professional football player who was a placekicker and kickoff specialist in the National Football League (NFL) for the Dallas Cowboys. He was selected by the Cowboys in the fifth round of the 2009 NFL draft. He played college football for the USC Trojans.

== Early life ==
Buehler attended Canyon High School in Anaheim, California, where he lettered in football, volleyball, golf, and track. In football, he played linebacker and running back. He wore jersey #37 and was an All-Century League football selection as a senior. He graduated in 2005.

== College career ==
=== Santa Ana ===
Buehler enrolled at Santa Ana College in Santa Ana, California, for the 2005–2006 school year. In football, he played placekicker, safety, goal-line running back and a gunner on punts. He was named to the All-Mission Conference National Division first-team. He tallied 24 tackles, one interception, 9 carries for 50 yards (5.6-yard avg.), 6 touchdowns and had 25 touchbacks on his 58 kickoffs.

At the junior college scouting combine he had the fastest 40-yard dash time. USC coaches saw Buehler's potential at multiple positions, and head coach Pete Carroll offered him a scholarship in the summer of 2006.

=== USC Trojans ===
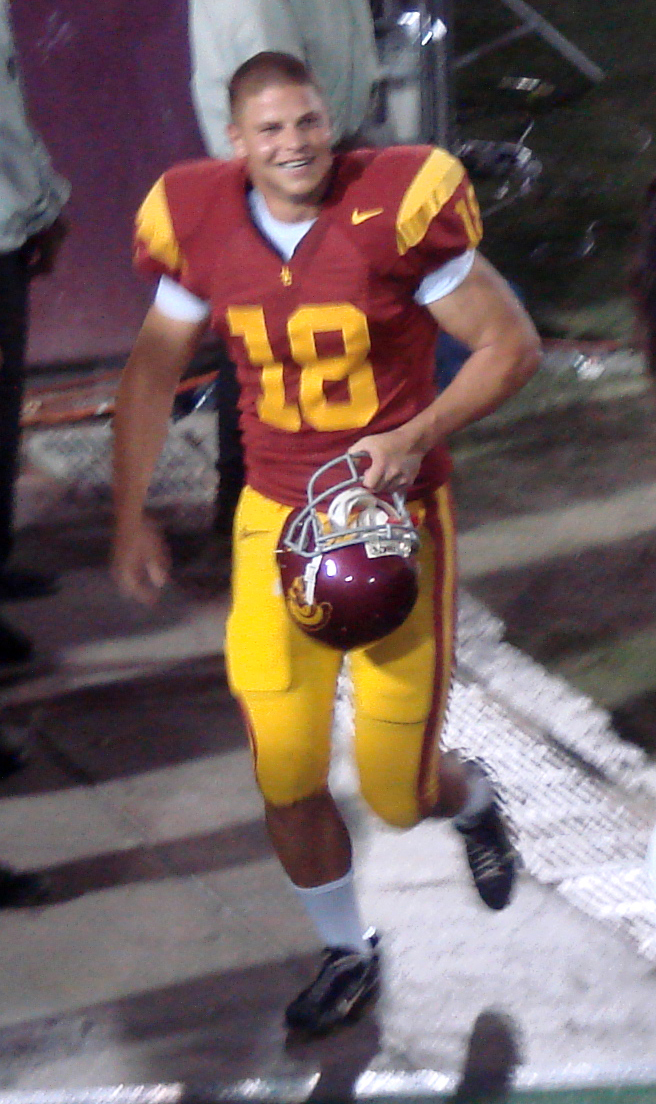
Buehler leaving the field after a 2007 USC game

Buehler was recruited to USC for multiple positions, and in his first season with the Trojans (2006) was designated as a third-string placekicker, fullback and safety while playing coverage on special teams. He appeared in 11 games, primarily on special teams. Because he had a longer range than the Trojans' starting kicker, Mario Danelo, Buehler was used as for one, long field goal attempt, a successful 49-yard kick against California; it was the Trojans' longest field goal since 1998. Buehler had not expected to kick during the game, he made the kick while wearing the heavier equipment of a fullback and tied the score at 9 as the Trojans went on their way to a conference-clinching victory. He had one kickoff during the 2006 Stanford game and, after starting kicker Troy Van Blarcom was dismissed from the team for academic reasons at the end of the regular season, Buehler handled kickoff duties during the 2007 Rose Bowl. Of his 8 kickoffs that season, 6 pinned opponents within the 20-yard line, with 3 touchbacks.

Days after the 2007 Rose Bowl, Danelo, the two-year starting placekicker died in an accident. Danelo had been expected to start during the 2007 season; with his death and the dismissal of Van Blarcom the previous month, Buehler became the starting kicker and dropped his other positions. He started all 13 games, successfully making 16-of-19 field goals and 52-of-54 extra points, plus he made 3 special teams tackles. Thirty-five of his 84 kickoffs kept opponents within their 20-yard line, with 18 touchbacks.

Buehler started all 13 games as a senior in the 2008 season, making 9 of 13 field goals and 65 of 66 extra points. Three of his four missed field goals during the season came in the regular season finale against rival UCLA, where he missed all three attempts in a 28–7 Trojans victory. Buehler blamed himself for trying to do a different routine before the contest. He was able to bounce back during the 2009 Rose Bowl, making his one field goal attempt and successfully kicking all five extra points in a 38–24 victory over Penn State.

Buehler finished the 2008 season with 5,976 yards on 88 kickoffs. He also registered 48 total touchbacks on those 88 kickoffs.

== Professional football ==
=== Pre-draft ===
Buehler was one of twelve USC players invited to the 2009 NFL Scouting Combine, where he opted to participate in areas not required of kickers. He recorded results on strength and speed tests that were better than other regarded linebackers and offensive linemen.

He recorded 25 reps of 225 pounds on the bench press test, better than USC teammate Rey Maualuga, linemen Michael Oher and Eugene Monroe, and equal to Aaron Curry, and ran 4.56 and 4.63 seconds in the 40-yard dash, better than teammates Brian Cushing and Clay Matthews III.

Pre-draft measurables
Height	Weight	Arm length	Hand span	40-yard dash	10-yard split	20-yard split	Bench press	Wonderlic
6 ft 1 3/4 in (1.87 m)	227 lb (103 kg)	30 1/4 in (0.77 m)	8 1/2 in (0.22 m)	4.63 s	1.61 s	2.68 s	25 reps	22
All values from NFL Combine

=== Dallas Cowboys ===
Buehler was selected by the Dallas Cowboys in the fifth round (172nd overall) of the 2009 NFL draft. He was the first kicker taken after an impressive showing at the NFL combine. He also was the first USC kicker to be drafted since Cole Ford in 1995. He handled the team's kickoffs and missed his only field goal attempt in the Cowboys' opening regular season game against the Washington Redskins. He made his only attempt (from 39 yards) in a pre-season game against Oakland Raiders on August 13, 2009. He also took the field on the kick and punt return teams.

In May 2009, when the Dallas Cowboys' training facility collapsed during rookie mini-camp, Buehler was one of the few players injured. Standing on the sideline at the time of the collapse, he ran out a side door and was sprinting across a practice field when a pole from the structure crashed into him. The impact caused a minor concussion, gashes in his forehead and right knee, and had skin ripped off his ear; he required three stitches on his kicking knee.

During training camp, Buehler tired of taunts from defensive back DeAngelo Smith (a fifth-round 2009 draft pick) about how he didn't do anything during practice, challenged him to a 50-yard run. Buehler won comfortably. He made the team as a kickoff specialist, which was the first time in the history of the Cowboys that it carried a player for only that specific role.

At the end of his rookie year, he finished the regular season with 29 touchbacks, which led the NFL and also set a new franchise record for most touchbacks in a single season, with the previous mark being 27 by Lin Elliot in 1992.

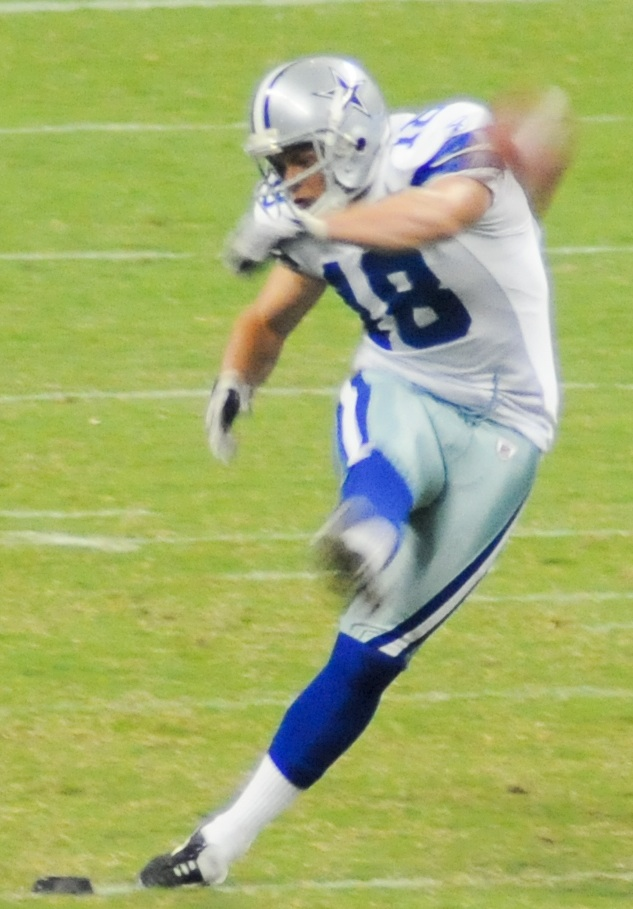
Buehler with the Dallas Cowboys in 2010

In 2010, he won the starting placekicker job without much competition, after Nick Folk was released the previous year. He finished with 24-of-32 field goal attempts (75%) and 42-of-44 extra points (95.5%). He missed an extra point against the Arizona Cardinals that resulted in a 26–27 loss. He converted four field goals from 50+ yards to tie a franchise record set by Ken Willis (1991). He registered 14 special teams tackles (fifth on the team), setting a club record for kickers. At the time, his 45 touchbacks also passed Toby Gowin (42) for the most in a career in franchise history, dating back to 1990. He finished 10th in the league in scoring (112) and tied for 13th in total field goals made (24).

Although Buehler hit a career long field goal of 53 yards on November 25, 2010, against the New Orleans Saints, he also missed a 59-yard field goal which had a chance to tie the game up. He suffered from inconsistency, making only 24 out of 32 field goals attempts, ranking 30th out of 32 NFL kickers in accuracy. In 2011, this caused the Cowboys to give the starter job to rookie Dan Bailey, while Buehler was relegated to handle only the kickoffs, as he did in 2009. He would end up missing most of the season with a groin injury (only played 4 games) and was placed on the injured reserve list on November 10. He required surgery to fix a torn adductor muscle.

Buehler was waived on March 13, 2012, after not being able to develop into a consistent field goal placekicker and the team deciding not to carry a kickoff specialist. In 36 games, he recorded 60 touchbacks, 24 out of 32 field goals made (75%), 42 out of 44 extra points made (95.5%) and 19 special teams tackles.

=== New York Giants ===
On February 13, 2013, Buehler signed with the New York Giants to compete for the placekicker job during preseason. On July 26, he was released after not being able to pass Josh Brown on the depth chart.

== Personal life ==
Buehler's father, John, was a shot putter for the USC Trojans. His uncle, George Buehler, played football for Stanford University and later the Oakland Raiders and Cleveland Browns; another uncle also played football at Stanford. His grandfather, Fredrick Ford Lynch was a football player for the USC Trojans.
