= Sam Young (American football) =

American football player (born 1987)

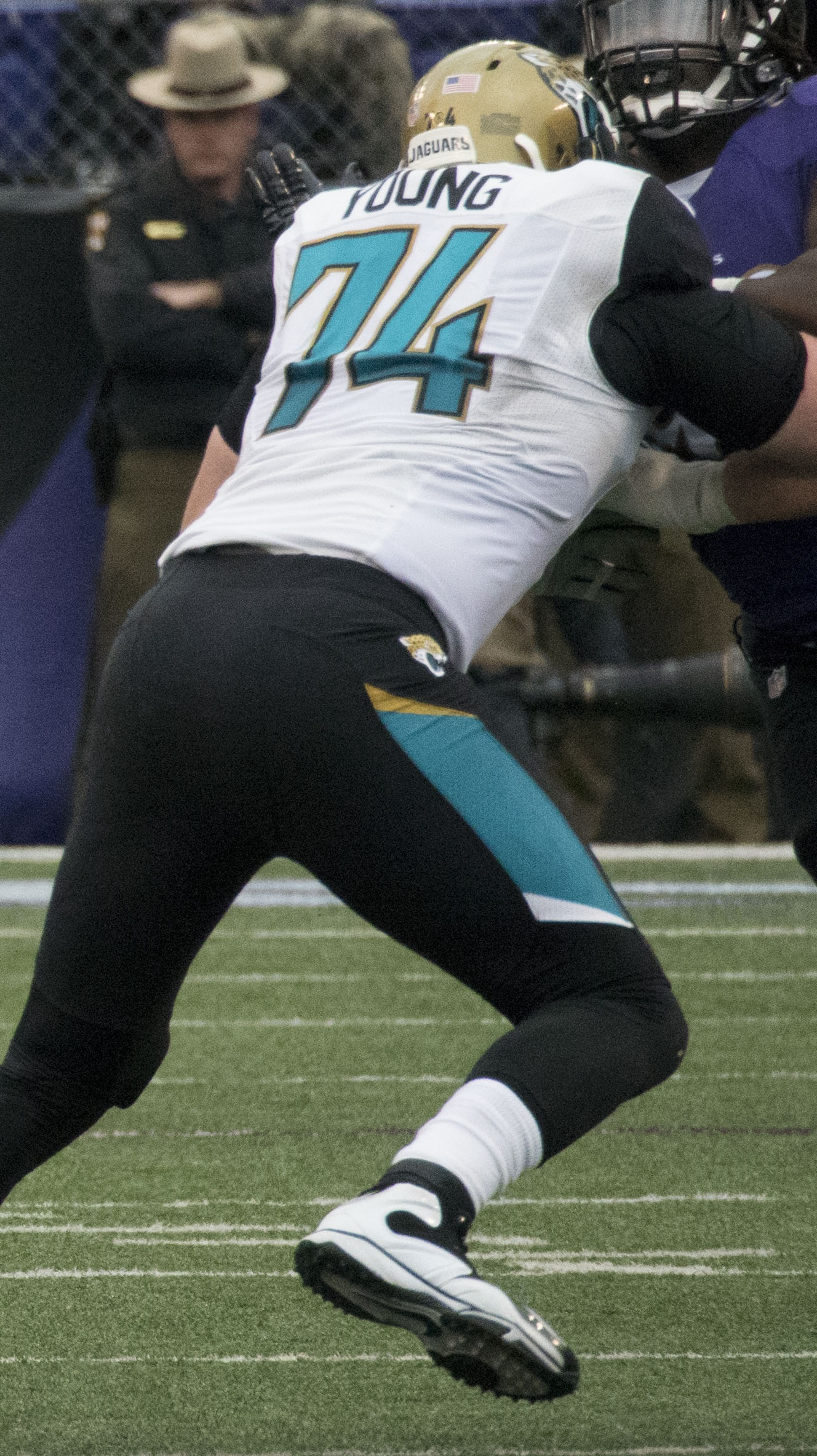
- Young with the Jacksonville Jaguars in 2014

No. 76, 71, 74, 79, 65, 70
- Position: Offensive tackle

Personal information
- Born: June 24, 1987 (age 39); Coral Springs, Florida, U.S.
- Listed height: 6 ft 8 in (2.03 m)
- Listed weight: 302 lb (137 kg)

Career information
- High school: St. Thomas Aquinas (Fort Lauderdale, Florida)
- College: Notre Dame (2006–2009)
- NFL draft: 2010: 6th round, 179th overall pick

Career history
- Dallas Cowboys (2010); Buffalo Bills (2011–2013); Jacksonville Jaguars (2013–2015); Miami Dolphins (2016–2018); San Francisco 49ers (2019); Las Vegas Raiders (2020)

Career NFL statistics
- Games played: 92
- Games started: 21
- Stats at Pro Football Reference

Sam Young (born June 24, 1987) is an American former professional football player who was an offensive tackle for 10 seasons in the National Football League (NFL). He was selected by the Dallas Cowboys in the sixth round of the 2010 NFL draft, and played college football for the Notre Dame Fighting Irish.

Young played for six different teams during his NFL career, where he was primarily a backup. He had his longest stints with the Jacksonville Jaguars and Miami Dolphins at roughly three seasons each from 2013–2015 and 2016–2018, respectively.

== Early life ==
Young attended Pine Crest School, playing tight end in football, defense in lacrosse, center on junior varsity basketball, and competed on the weight lifting team. After his freshmen season he transferred to St. Thomas Aquinas High School.

He was moved to left tackle and did not allow a sack during his junior and senior years. He was a two-time Florida Class 5A All-state selection. He also practiced the discus throw and won the state title in the shot put, breaking a school record.

In 2005, he was a Parade All-America first-team selection and received the Florida Gatorade Player of the Year. Following his stellar high school football career, Young was invited to play in the 2006 U.S. Army All-American Bowl.

== College career ==
Young accepted a football scholarship from the University of Notre Dame. He became the first true freshman to start the season opener on the offensive line (right tackle) since freshmen became eligible in 1972. He was named first-team Freshman All-American by The Sporting News in 2006.

As a sophomore, he started the first two games at right tackle, before being switched to the left side for the remaining 10 contests. As a junior, he started all 13 games at right tackle.

As a senior, he started all 12 games at right tackle, helping the offense to finish fifth in the nation in passing (323.5-yards per-game) and eighth in total offense (451.8-yards), while averaging 30.1 points-per-game. In his college career, Young made 50 starts on the offensive line and all consecutive (both were school records at the time).

== Professional career ==
Pre-draft measurables
Height	Weight	Arm length	Hand span	40-yard dash	20-yard shuttle	Three-cone drill	Vertical jump	Broad jump	Bench press
6 ft 7 5/8 in (2.02 m)	316 lb (143 kg)	34 1/2 in (0.88 m)	10 1/8 in (0.26 m)	5.24 s	4.87 s	7.73 s	29.5 in (0.75 m)	8 ft 8 in (2.64 m)	29 reps
All values from NFL Combine

=== Dallas Cowboys ===
Young was selected by the Dallas Cowboys in the sixth round (179th overall) of the 2010 NFL draft. He was active in 3 games (did not play against the Jacksonville Jaguars) and was declared inactive in 13 contests, while contributing on special teams. In 2011, he had a disappointing training camp and was reportedly beaten often by defenders in practice. He was waived on September 5.

=== Buffalo Bills ===
On September 6, 2011, he was claimed off waivers by the Buffalo Bills. He appeared in 4 games and was declared inactive in 12 contests.

In 2012, he played in 12 games with 4 inactive designations and 4 starts at right tackle in place of an injured Chris Hairston. On October 7, 2013, he was waived after appearing in four games with one inactive designation.

=== Jacksonville Jaguars ===
On October 8, 2013, the Jacksonville Jaguars claimed him off waivers and was active in 11 games, playing mainly on special teams. On March 6, 2014, he was re-signed by the Jaguars. He played in 9 games, with 6 starts at right tackle and was declared inactive in 7 contests.

In 2015, he appeared in 16 games for the first time in his career, starting two at left tackle in place of an injured Luke Joeckel and one at right tackle in place of an injured Jermey Parnell.

=== Miami Dolphins ===
On March 9, 2016, Young signed a one-year $910,000 contract with the Miami Dolphins. On September 3, he was released as part of final roster cuts. He was re-signed on October 11, 2016. On December 28, Young signed a one-year $1.15 million contract extension. He appeared in 8 games and was declared inactive for 3 contests. He made one start at left tackle because of injuries.

On September 2, 2017, he was released. On September 4, he was re-signed. He played in 10 games, starting six at right tackle in place of the injured Ja'Wuan James. He was declared inactive for 6 contests. On March 23, 2018, Young re-signed with the Dolphins on a one-year contract. On September 2, he was released. On September 3, he was re-signed. On October 13, he was released. On October 15, he was re-signed. He appeared in 12 games (one start) and was declared inactive for 3 contests. Against the Green Bay Packers, he started at right tackle in place of an injured James. He was not re-signed after the season.

=== San Francisco 49ers ===
On August 12, 2019, he was signed by the San Francisco 49ers to replace an injured Shon Coleman. He was released during final roster cuts on August 30. He was re-signed on September 20. He played in 4 games and was declared inactive for 2 contests. He was released on November 7, 2019.

=== Las Vegas Raiders ===
On May 5, 2020, Young signed with the Las Vegas Raiders. He was released during final roster cuts on September 5, but re-signed with the team two days later. He re-signed with the Raiders on June 7, 2021. He announced his retirement on August 3.
