= Stillwater High School (New York) =

Stillwater Central School District

Location
- 1068 North Hudson Ave. Stillwater, Saratoga County, New York 12170; United States; 42°56′54.7″N 73°38′29.2″W

Information
- School type: Public
- Superintendent: Patricia Morris
- Grades: K-12
- Enrollment: K-12 1,270
- Student to teacher ratio: 8:1
- Colors: Maroon and silver
- Nickname: Warriors
- Communities served: Stillwater, New York, part of towns of Saratoga and Easton
- Website: High School website

Stillwater Central School District is a school located in the village of Stillwater, New York. The school has two buildings on its campus; one is for elementary grades and the other holds the middle and high school classes. The school serves Stillwater and portions of the towns of Saratoga and Easton.

== Student life ==
The school mascot is the Warriors and the colors are maroon and white, although black has been used on some older uniforms. Recently, a new football/soccer field with lights replaced the old. The field has a turf surface and was built over the old baseball field. The new baseball field was moved to the American Legion in the middle of the village. Along with that, a new gymnasium has been built to better serve the school. In 2024, the boys' basketball team won the championship in their division, while the girls' team also finished in their division championships.

Sports that are offered by the school include football, boys lacrosse, boys and girls soccer, golf, girls volleyball, cross country, basketball and football cheerleading, alpine skiing, boys and girls basketball, indoor track, baseball, softball, outdoor track, bowling and a Rowing Club.

Students at Stillwater Central School District have access to several extracurriculars and clubs, including nationally recognized programs such as Link Crew and Key Club.

== Notable alumni ==
- Scott Sicko, former National Football League (NFL) player
