= Scott Sicko =

American football player (born 1988)

Profile
- Position: Tight end

Personal information
- Born: January 30, 1988 (age 38); Albany, New York, U.S.
- Listed height: 6 ft 4 in (1.93 m)
- Listed weight: 251 lb (114 kg)

Career information
- College: New Hampshire

Career history
- Dallas Cowboys (2010)*
- * Offseason or practice squad member only

Scott Leonard Sicko (born January 30, 1988) is an American former professional football tight end. He was signed by the Dallas Cowboys as an undrafted free agent in 2010. He played college football at New Hampshire.

== Early life ==
Sicko played his first two years of football at Stillwater High School in his hometown. He then transferred to La Salle Institute in Troy, New York. Sicko made 70 receptions as a tight end for 1,449 yards and 25 touchdowns his first year there. He also played defensive end, recording 103 tackles and 14.5 sacks his senior year. He led his team to a state Section 2 Class AA championship in 2005. He was named second-team all-state at defensive end.

== College career ==
=== Freshman year ===
Sicko started off his college career by catching 2 passes for 19 yards in 2006.

=== Sophomore year ===
In 2007, Sicko was third on the team in both receiving yards and touchdowns, with 619 and 6 respectively. He was also second in receptions with 51. He was named an All-American by several media outlets.

=== Junior year ===
In 2008, Sicko played in 12 games for the Wildcats, catching 50 passes for 660 yards and seven touchdowns in the process. He was named an Associated Press FCS All-American and an ECAC All-Star.

=== Senior year ===
In 2009, he led the Wildcats in receptions with 57. He also had 725 yards and nine touchdowns. He finished his collegiate career with 160 receptions for 2,023 yards and 22 touchdowns.

== Professional career ==
=== Dallas Cowboys ===
Sicko stated that if he was not drafted in the 2010 NFL draft, he would refuse to sign with any team, so that he could finish his studies. Sicko went undrafted and initially did not sign with any team for a few days before he changed his mind and decided to sign with the Dallas Cowboys.

He was waived on August 30, 2010.
