= Mike Tannenbaum =

American football executive

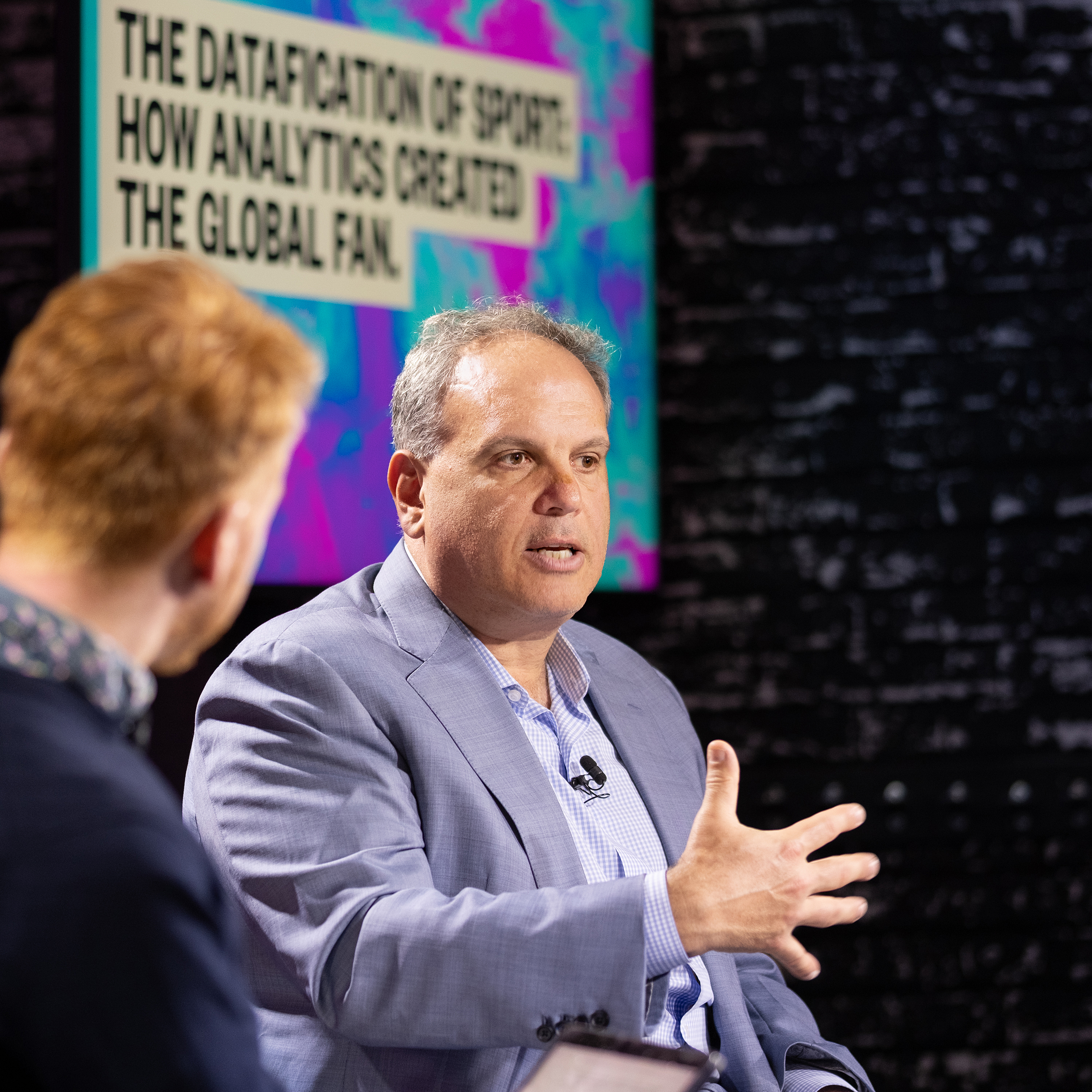
- Mike Tannenbaum at SXSW London 2026

Personal information
- Born: February 14, 1969 (age 57); New York City, New York, U.S.

Career information
- High school: Needham (Needham, Massachusetts)
- College: University of Massachusetts Amherst, Tulane University Law School

Career history
- Pittsfield Mets (1991) Intern; New Orleans Saints (1994) Intern; Cleveland Browns (1995) Player personnel assistant; New Orleans Saints (1996) Player personnel assistant; New York Jets (1997–2000) Director of player contracts; New York Jets (2000) Director of pro player development; New York Jets (2001–2005) Assistant general manager & director of pro personnel; New York Jets (2006–2012) General manager & senior vice president of football operations; Miami Dolphins (2015–2018) Executive vice president of football operations
- Executive profile at Pro Football Reference

Mike Tannenbaum (born February 14, 1969) is an American professional football analyst and former executive. He served as the executive vice president of football operations for the Miami Dolphins from 2015 to 2018. Prior to that, he served as the general manager for the New York Jets of the National Football League (NFL). He founded The 33rd Team, which describes itself as a "football Think Tank." He currently works as an NFL analyst for ESPN.

== Education ==
Tannenbaum graduated from Needham High School in Needham, Massachusetts, in 1987. He received a degree in accounting and a minor in sports management from the University of Massachusetts Amherst. He then graduated cum laude from Tulane University Law School, where he earned his certificate in sports law.

== Career ==
=== Pittsfield Mets ===
Tannenbaum was an intern for the minor league Pittsfield Mets during the 1991 season.

=== Cleveland Browns ===
Tannenbaum worked in the Cleveland Browns' personnel department acting as an assistant under Michael Lombardi.

=== New Orleans Saints ===
Tannenbaum worked as an intern in the New Orleans Saints personnel department while he attended law school In 1996, he worked for the team as a player personnel assistant.

=== New York Jets ===
Tannenbaum was hired by the New York Jets on February 19, 1997, as the director of player contract negotiations. Over the years, Tannenbaum served in numerous administrative positions with the team, including senior vice president of football operations and assistant general manager.

Tannenbaum succeeded Terry Bradway as the team's general manager in 2006.

Tannenbaum signed a contract extension with the team through 2014; however, following the last game of the 2012 NFL regular season, Jets owner Woody Johnson announced that Tannenbaum would not return for the 2013 season.

=== Priority Sports ===
Tannenbaum was hired by Priority Sports and Entertainment, where he oversaw the coaching, broadcasting and front-office for the New York branch. Some notable clients Tannenbaum represented were: Dan Quinn, Steve Kerr, Phil Savage, and Jack Arute. Tannenbaum resigned from Priority Sports in early 2015 to accept a position with the Miami Dolphins.

=== Miami Dolphins ===
Tannenbaum was hired by the Dolphins to be the executive vice president of football operations, starting February 1, 2015, after acting as a consultant for the team during the 2014 NFL season. On December 31, 2018, he was reassigned from his duties without a defined purpose.

== ESPN ==
In April 2019, Tannenbaum joined ESPN as an NFL Front Office Insider.
