= Justin Zanik =

American Basketball executive

Utah Jazz
- Position: General manager
- League: NBA

Personal information
- Born: October 2, 1974 (age 52) Kansas

Career information
- College: Northwestern University (BA)

Justin Zanik (born October 2, 1974) is the general manager of the Utah Jazz.

Zanik has been a certified NBAPA since 2003.

== Early life and career ==
Zanik grew up in Missouri, and attended Northwestern University to earn a BA degree in economics from 1993 to 1998. While in college, Zanik was a member of the Delta Tau Delta fraternity and initially a major in music opera before pivoting to economics.

Zanik met player agent Mark Bartelstein, founder of Priority Sports and Entertainment, while volunteering as a coach of a sixth-grade basketball team.

Zanik's first job after college was Priority Sports and Entertainment (1998–2002) as VP of basketball operations where he managed European contract negotiations in the Chicago office. While working for Priority Sports, he met his wife, Gina, who also worked with the company. Zanik then served as a sports agent for basketball clients at ASM Sports (2003–13), assistant general manager of the Utah Jazz (2013–16), assistant general manager of the Milwaukee Bucks (2016–17) under GM John Hammond, and assistant general manager (again) for the Utah Jazz (2017–19) which had remained vacant during the span of Zanik's absence.

== Utah Jazz ==
In his first year back with the Utah Jazz, Zanik worked alongside GM Dennis Lindsey and assistant GM David Morway to add key players such as Royce O'Neale and Georges Niang.

In the summer of 2019, Zanik was involved in the signing of Bojan Bogdanović and trading for Mike Conley. Zanik told Bogdanovic, “Your toughness, your ability to space the floor, contribute to the group…all the little things that you did in Indiana last year, especially after being able to carry the team the last three or four months really made an impression on us.”

On May 10, 2019, Justin Zanik was named new GM for the Utah Jazz, taking over the vacancy left by Dennis Lindsey who was promoted to EVP of basketball operations. Zanik helps facilitate contract negotiations, manage salary caps and oversee scouting of prospects, as well as other responsibilities.

Zanik brought in chef Anthony Zamora, one of three registered dietitians working for an NBA team, to the Zions Bank Basketball Campus training facility giving personalized meal plans upon request.

== Family and medical issues ==
Shortly before the Jazz opened their 2023–24 training camp, Zanik's wife Gina urged him to schedule a physical, noticing that he felt more tired than usual. He had not had an examination in eight years. He scheduled his physical with the Jazz's team doctor for September 28, and on his 49th birthday on October 1, the doctor told him he was in kidney failure, with only 14% of his normal kidney function remaining. Zanik was diagnosed with polycystic kidney disease (PKD), a condition that runs in his family; his father received a kidney transplant as a result of the disease in 2003. After a wide search for a living donor, the husband of Gina's childhood best friend proved to be a match, and Zanik received the kidney on April 2, 2024.

He and Gina have three children. Gina is the co-founder and executive director of the Rare and Undiagnosed Network, an advocacy group for individuals with rare medical conditions. Gina and all three children suffer from autonomic neuropathy, stemming from nerve damage that affects automatic body functions. During Zanik's wait for a transplant, all three children were also diagnosed with PKD; each child will likely require a kidney transplant before age 60. (the children were between 12 and 16 at the time of their father's transplant).

== See also ==
- List of NBA general managers

Sporting positions
Preceded by Dennis Lindsey	Utah Jazz General Manager; 2021–present	Incumbent
