= Dennis Lindsey =

American basketball executive

Detroit Pistons
- Position: Senior Vice President of Basketball Operations
- League: NBA

Personal information
- Born: February 4, 1969 (age 57) Lake Jackson, Texas, U.S.

Career information
- High school: Brazoswood High School
- College: Baylor (1987-1991)

Dennis Dale Lindsey (born February 4, 1969) is an American professional basketball executive who currently serves as the Senior Vice President of Basketball Operations for the Detroit Pistons of the National Basketball Association (NBA). After holding the role of General Manager of the Utah Jazz from 2012 to 2019, Lindsey was then promoted to Executive Vice President of Basketball Operations in May 2019 up until the start of the 2021 season, where he later stepped down. He joined the Dallas Mavericks as an advisor in 2023.

== Early life and education ==
Lindsey was born in Lake Jackson, Texas to parents Dennis Earl Lindsey (father): a Vietnam War veteran and supply clerk and Carol Ann Holman (mother). Lindsey also has a younger sister named Christy. Lindsey grew up in Brazoria County, Texas. Lindsey graduated from Brazoswood High School in 1987.

Lindsey played college basketball at Baylor under head coach Gene Iba as a guard. Iba described Lindsey, on signing Day, as a multi-dimensional player that can not only "shoot the 3-point shot well" but also is "an extremely good athlete" at the same time.

Lindsey graduated with a Bachelor of Science degree in education (BSEd) from Baylor University in 1992 and a Master of Sports Science (MSS) degree in Sports administration from United States Sports Academy in 1994.

== Career ==
Lindsey joined the Houston Rockets during the summer of 1996 as a video coordinator and scout and worked his way up the team's management ladder. He was named the Rockets's director of basketball development in 1998 and was promoted to director of player personnel in 1999. Lindsey was then elevated to the position of vice president of basketball operations/player personnel in 2002. He then became the team's assistant general manager.

He was then an assistant general manager for the San Antonio Spurs from 2007 to 2012. After that, Lindsey became the general manager of the Utah Jazz.

On June 25, 2024, Lindsey was named Senior Vice President of Basketball Operations for the Detroit Pistons.

=== Allegations ===
In February 2021, Jazz player Elijah Millsap alleged on Twitter that Lindsey made racist remarks to him in 2015. Within days of the allegations, Lindsey categorically denied making the remark, and Quin Snyder — the Jazz head coach — noted:

"Honestly, I don’t remember the conversation. I can’t fathom Dennis saying something like that.”

In March 2021, the National Basketball Association announced that it was "unable to establish" whether or not Millsap's version of events was accurate. In the announcement, The NBA noted that all meeting participants were interviewed as part of their investigation. The meeting included: Lindsey, Millsap, Snyder, and Jazz General Manager Justin Zanik.

In April 2021, Millsap was quoted standing by his allegations against Lindsey, even after the NBA was unable to conclude whether or not the events took place.

In the summer of 2021 Lindsey stepped down from his position as executive vice president of basketball operations and transitioned to an advisory role.

== Personal life ==
Lindsey married to Baylor alumna and Kindergarten Teacher Rebecca "Becky" Lynn Dry on June 6, 1992. The couple have four children: Jacob, Matthew, Meredith, and Jessica Claire.
