= Utah Jazz =

National Basketball Association team in Salt Lake City, Utah

- 2026–27 Utah Jazz season
- Conference: Western
- Division: Northwest
- Founded: 1974
- History: New Orleans Jazz; 1974–1979; Utah Jazz; 1979–present
- Arena: Delta Center
- Location: Salt Lake City, Utah
- Team colors: Mountain purple, midnight black, sky blue, gray
- Main sponsor: HealthEquity
- CEO: Danny Ainge
- President: Austin Ainge
- General manager: Justin Zanik
- Head coach: Will Hardy
- Ownership: Ryan Smith; Dwyane Wade (co-owner)
- Affiliation: Salt Lake City Stars
- Championships: 0
- Conference titles: 2 (1997, 1998)
- Division titles: 11 (1984, 1989, 1992, 1997, 1998, 2000, 2007, 2008, 2017, 2021, 2022)
- Retired numbers: 10 (1, 4, 7, 9, 12, 14, 32, 35, 53, 1223)
- Website: nba.com/jazz
Association	Icon	Statement
City

The Utah Jazz are an American professional basketball team based in Salt Lake City. The Jazz compete in the National Basketball Association (NBA) as a member of the Northwest Division of the Western Conference. Since the 1991–92 season, the team has played its home games at the Delta Center, an arena they share with the Utah Mammoth of the National Hockey League (NHL). The franchise began as an expansion team in the 1974–75 season as the New Orleans Jazz, paying homage to New Orleans as the origin and cultural center of the jazz music genre. The Jazz moved from New Orleans to Salt Lake City on June 8, 1979.

The Jazz were one of the least successful teams in the league in their early years as an expansion team. Although 10 seasons elapsed before the Jazz qualified for their first playoff appearance in 1984, they did not miss the playoffs again until 2004.

During the late 1980s, John Stockton and Karl Malone arose as the franchise players for the team and formed one of the most famed pick and roll duos in NBA history. Led by Hall of Fame coach Jerry Sloan, who took over from Frank Layden in 1988, they became one of the powerhouse teams of the 1990s, culminating in two NBA Finals appearances in 1997 and 1998, where they lost both times to the Michael Jordan led Chicago Bulls.

Both Stockton and Malone moved on in 2003. After missing the playoffs for three consecutive seasons, the Jazz returned to prominence under the on-court leadership of point guard Deron Williams. However, partway through the 2010–11 season, the Jazz began restructuring after Sloan retired and Williams was traded. Quin Snyder was hired as head coach in June 2014. With the development of Rudy Gobert and Donovan Mitchell into All-Stars, the Jazz launched themselves back into title contention, eventually earning the league's best regular season record in the 2020–21 season. However, following disappointing early playoff exits in both 2021 and 2022, the Jazz traded Mitchell and Gobert in the 2022 offseason and entered a new era of rebuilding centered around Lauri Markkanen, who was acquired in the Mitchell trade.

== History ==
=== 1974–1979: Early years in New Orleans with Pete Maravich ===
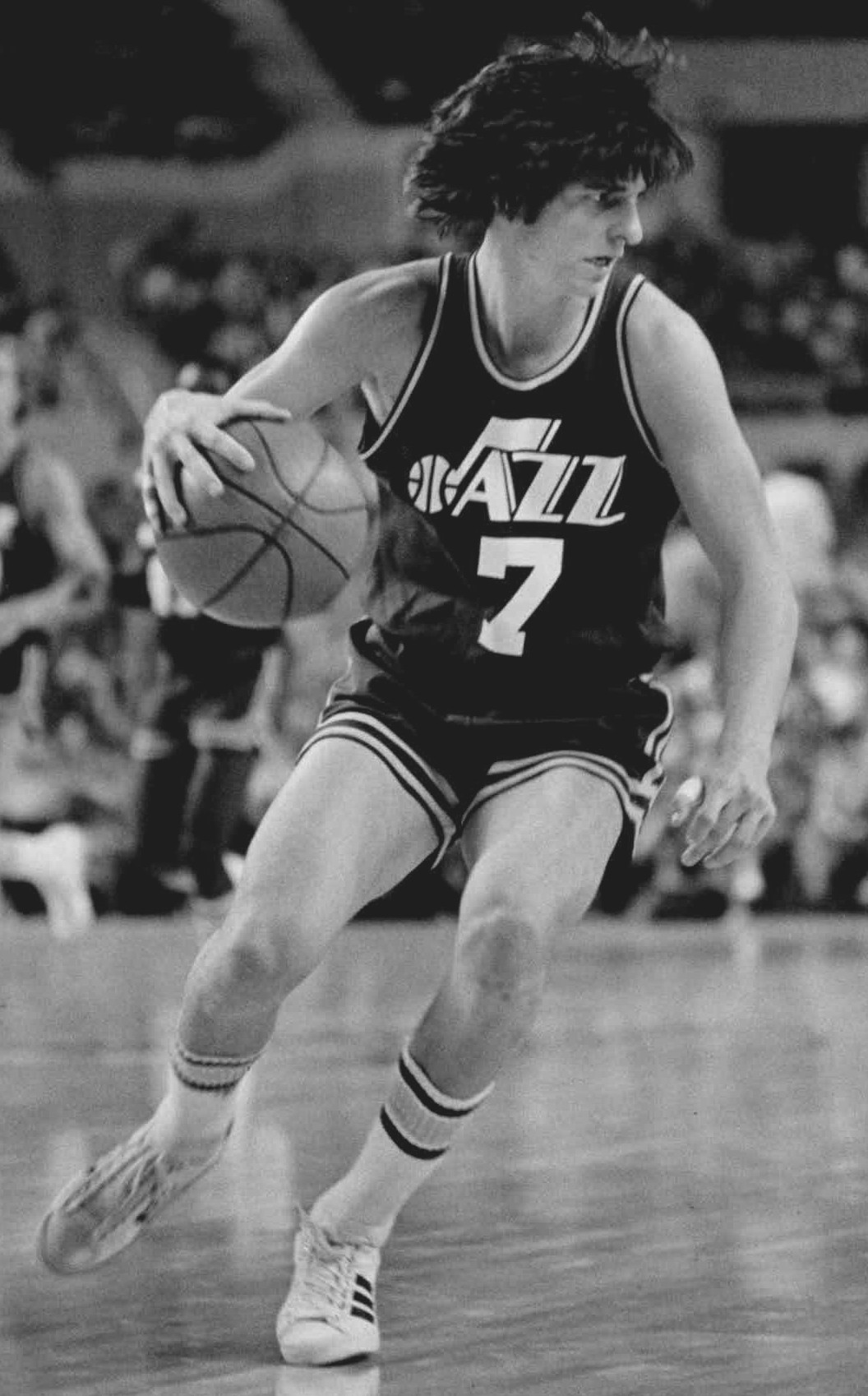
Pete Maravich played for the Jazz from 1974 to 1980.

On June 7, 1974, the New Orleans Jazz were admitted as an expansion franchise into the National Basketball Association (NBA). The first owner of the team was an ownership group led by Sam Battistone. Team officials selected the name because of its definition in the dictionary: collective improvisation. The team began its inaugural season in New Orleans in the 1974–75 season. The team colors were purple, gold, and green. The team's first major move was to trade for star player Pete Maravich (who had played college basketball at LSU) from the Atlanta Hawks for two first-round draft picks, three second-round picks, and one third-round pick over the next three years.

Venue issues were a continual problem for the team while it was based in New Orleans. In the Jazz's first season, they played in the Municipal Auditorium and Loyola Field House, where the basketball court was raised so high that the NBA Players Association made the team put a net around the court to prevent players from falling off of the court and into the stands. Later, the Jazz played games in the cavernous Louisiana Superdome, but things were no better, because of high demand for the stadium, onerous lease terms, New Orleans' 11% amusement tax (highest in the nation), and Maravich's constant knee problems. They also faced the prospect of spending a whole month on the road each year because of New Orleans' Mardi Gras festivities, similar to the long road trip faced by the San Antonio Spurs each season during their city's rodeo.

=== 1979–1984: Moving to Utah, and the Frank Layden era ===
Deciding the Jazz were no longer viable in New Orleans, Battistone decided to move elsewhere. After scouting several new homes, he decided on Salt Lake City, even though it was a smaller market. Salt Lake City had previously been home to the Utah Stars of the American Basketball Association (ABA) from 1970 to 1976. The Stars had been extremely popular in the city and had even won an ABA title in their first season after moving from Los Angeles. However, their financial situation deteriorated in their last two seasons, and they were shut down by the league 16 games into the 1975–76 season in December 1975 after missing payroll. The franchise kept the name despite the lack of a jazz music scene in Utah, as there was not enough time before the 1979–80 season to receive league approval for a name change. The NBA would return to New Orleans in 2002 when the Charlotte Hornets moved to become the New Orleans Hornets (now New Orleans Pelicans).

The Jazz's attendance declined slightly after the team's move from New Orleans to Utah, partly because of a late approval for the move (June 1979) and also poor marketing in the Salt Lake City area.

Tom Nissalke departed as coach after the Jazz started the 1981–82 season 8–12, and general manager Frank Layden replaced him.

In 1983, the team was losing money, and management was crafting stunts, such as playing games at the Thomas & Mack Center in Las Vegas, to help the team become more profitable. The team was rumored to be moving as a result of Battistone's cash shortage as well as the fact they were playing in the league's smallest market. However, fortunes on the court improved, with a healthy Adrian Dantley, Jeff Wilkins, and rookie Thurl Bailey at the forward positions, Mark Eaton and Rich Kelley jointly manning the post, Rickey Green and Darrell Griffith at the guards, and John Drew adding 17 points per game off the bench. They went 45–37 and won the Midwest Division, the first winning season and division championship in team history.

=== 1984–2003: The Malone and Stockton era ===
Jazz fans were not happy when the team picked an unknown guard in the first round of the 1984 NBA draft, John Stockton. The Jazz fans on hand for the draft party booed the selection.

The 1984–85 season saw the emergence of Mark Eaton as a defensive force. Eaton averaged 5.6 blocks per game (still an NBA single-season record) along with 9.7 points and 11.3 rebounds, and won the NBA Defensive Player of the Year Award. On the downside, John Drew played only 19 games all season, which deprived the team of their high-scoring sixth man. However, the Jazz returned to the playoffs, facing the Houston Rockets and their All-Star centers, Hakeem Olajuwon and Ralph Sampson. The Jazz prevailed in the series, 3–2, and advanced to the second round, losing the series to the high-scoring Denver Nuggets, 4–1.

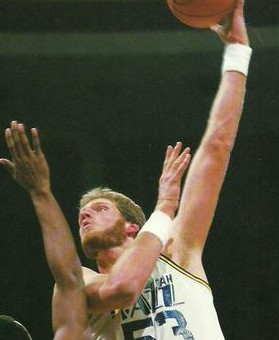
Mark Eaton was a Utah All-Star during the early days of the Stockton-Malone era and was a defensive force

The team's perennial financial woes and instability were somewhat stabilized during April 1985, when auto dealer Larry H. Miller bought 50% of the team from Battistone for $8 million. Battistone had been seeking to move the team.

In the 1985 NBA draft, the team added Louisiana Tech forward Karl Malone, who made an immediate impact in the 1985–86 season, averaging 14.9 points and 8.9 rebounds per game. However, starter Darrell Griffith missed the season with a stress fracture, and the Jazz hovered around .500 most of the year. Adrian Dantley missed the postseason, and the Jazz lost in the first round to the Dallas Mavericks, 3–1.

During the 1986 off-season, Battistone was approached to sell the team to Marv Wolfenson and Harvey Ratner, who would have moved the team to Minneapolis. Larry Miller did not want to sell the team, but because of contractual language in his agreement with Battistone, could have been bought out by the new owners if he had refused to sell. Offers went as high as $28 million (the Jazz were valued at $16 million less than a year earlier when Miller purchased half for $8 million) before Miller stepped in at the last minute, purchasing Battistone's remaining 50% for $14 million and keeping the team in Utah. Wolfenson and Ratner later became the founders of the Minnesota Timberwolves expansion franchise which, coincidentally, was almost sold and moved to New Orleans in 1994.

In 1986, Adrian Dantley, the team's star player who had carried them through the early years in Utah, was traded to Detroit for Kelly Tripucka, who ended up splitting time with Thurl Bailey. Darrell Griffith, back from injuries that caused him to miss the 1985–86 season, lost his starter spot at guard to Bob Hansen. Stockton warranted more time at the point guard position. Despite all these changes, the team finished 44–38 before losing to the Golden State Warriors in the first round of the playoffs.

For the 1987–88 season, Stockton took over for Rickey Green as the starting point guard, and Malone established himself as one of the better power forwards in the league. The team finished 47–35 and defeated Portland, 3–1, in the first round, earning a second-round matchup with the reigning NBA champions, the Los Angeles Lakers. After Los Angeles took Game 1 at home, the Jazz won Game 2 in Los Angeles, 101–97, and took the lead in the series 2–1 with a Game 3 win in Salt Lake City. The Jazz lost Games 4 and 5, but won Game 6, 108–80, tying the series 3–3. In the decisive Game 7, the Lakers won 109–98.

==== 1988–1990: Arrival of Jerry Sloan ====
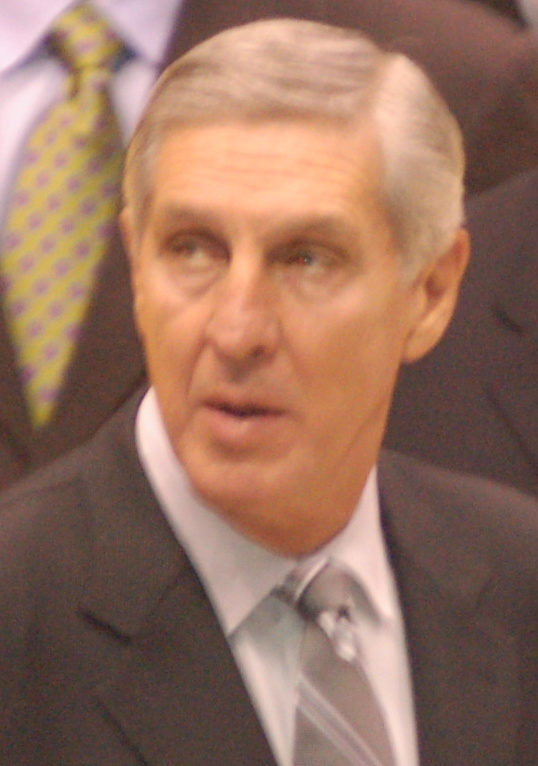
Longtime coach Jerry Sloan, who coached the Jazz over the two decades

During the 1988–89 season, Frank Layden stepped down as head coach of the Jazz after the first 17 games, and was replaced by Jerry Sloan. The Jazz won 51 games and the Midwest Division championship as they grew better overall. Malone and Stockton, as well as Mark Eaton, were the leaders of the team and also All-Star selections. Eaton won Defensive Player of the Year for the second time, and it appeared the Jazz were ready to take the next step toward contending for an NBA title, after having pushed the Lakers to seven games in the Western Conference semifinals the previous season. However, the second-seeded Jazz were eliminated in the first round in three games by the seventh-seeded Golden State Warriors.

The next year, 1989–90, the Jazz made some changes. Thurl Bailey, who was relied on for 19 points per game the previous season, saw his playing time reduced in favor of rookie Blue Edwards, who played a prominent role with the team. The result was the best win–loss mark in team history, as the Jazz finished 55–27, second in the division to the San Antonio Spurs (56–26). Malone had his best season statistically, averaging 31.0 points and 11.1 rebounds. Stockton averaged 17.2 points and 14.5 assists per game, both career highs, with the assist total and average leading the NBA that season. In the playoffs, the Jazz played the Phoenix Suns in the first round, led by All-Stars Tom Chambers and Kevin Johnson. The Suns defeated the Jazz 3 games to 2. Again, the Jazz were left with questions as to how they could do so well in the regular season but fail to advance in the playoffs.

==== 1990–1996: Working toward championship contention ====
For the 1990–91 season, the Jazz executed a three-way trade that brought shooting guard Jeff Malone from the Washington Bullets, while sending Eric Leckner and Bob Hansen to the Sacramento Kings and Pervis Ellison to Washington.

The Jazz began the season 22–15 before going 27–8 in January and February, with new addition Jeff Malone averaging 18.6 points, giving them three strong scoring options (Karl Malone, Jeff Malone, and John Stockton – 64.8 of the team's 104 points per game). The Jazz finished 54–28, again second in the division to San Antonio by a game. In the playoffs, they met the Phoenix Suns for the second year in a row. In Game 1 Utah won 129–90, which set the tone for the series, as Utah eliminated the Suns 3–1, earning a second-round matchup with the Portland Trail Blazers, the defending Western Conference champions. The Jazz played well, keeping close in most of the games, but lost the series 4–1 to a deeper and more experienced Trail Blazers team.

The 1991–92 season proved the most successful in team history to that time. The Jazz moved to the Delta Center, a state-of-the-art arena that could seat 19,911. The new venue was a considerable improvement over the Salt Palace, which seated just over 12,000 and lacked luxury suites and retail space. Early in the year, a trade brought Tyrone Corbin, a tough defensive forward, from Minnesota in exchange for fan-favorite Thurl Bailey.

The Jazz went 55–27 and won the Midwest Division championship for the first time since 1989. In the playoffs, the Jazz defeated the Los Angeles Clippers 3–2 in the first round, then beat the Seattle SuperSonics in the second round, 4–1, to advance to the Western Conference Finals for the first time, where they again faced and lost to Portland, this time 4–2.

The 1992–93 season was a letdown, as the team slumped to 47–35 and third place in the division. The center position, manned by defensive workhorse Mark Eaton for most of the past decade, became suspect as Eaton struggled with injuries and age. The bright spot for the season was the hosting of the NBA All-Star Game and the surrounding events of All-Star Weekend in Salt Lake City. In the playoffs, the Jazz lost to Seattle in the first round, 3–2. During the postseason, the team addressed its struggles at the center position by acquiring Felton Spencer from Minnesota in return for backup center Mike Brown.

During the 1993–94 season, the Jazz traded Jeff Malone to the Philadelphia 76ers for shooting guard Jeff Hornacek. Hornacek meshed well with Stockton, and the Jazz improved to 53–29. In the playoffs, they faced San Antonio in the first round, shutting down NBA scoring leader David Robinson throughout the series. Robinson had averaged 29.8 points on 50 percent shooting during the regular season, numbers that dropped to 20.0 and 41 percent in the series against Utah. The Jazz then fought off a determined Denver Nuggets team 4–3 in the conference semifinals (almost blowing a 3–0 series lead in the process) to advance to the Western Conference Finals, where they lost to the eventual NBA champion Houston Rockets 4–1.

In the 1994–95 season, the Jazz had significant depth and talent and were expected to make a serious run for the championship. However, they lost starter Spencer 34 games into the season with a ruptured Achilles tendon. Despite this setback, the Jazz finished 60–22 before again losing to Houston in the playoffs, 3–2, in the first round.

Greg Ostertag was added to the team for the 1995–96 season. The Jazz went 55–27, and reached the Conference Finals for the third time in history, nearly overcoming 3–1 series deficit before eventually succumbing to Seattle, 4–3.

==== 1996–1998: Reaching the NBA Finals ====
In the next two seasons, the Jazz were finally able to capitalize on regular-season success. In 1996–97, the Jazz had the best record in franchise history (64–18), won the Midwest Division and finished with the best record in the Western Conference. The team included Stockton, Malone and Hornacek as well as Bryon Russell, Greg Ostertag, Antoine Carr, Howard Eisley and Shandon Anderson. Malone won his first NBA MVP award, averaging 27.4 points, 9.9 rebounds and 4.5 assists per game.

The Jazz reached the NBA Finals for the first time after beating the Clippers 3–0, Lakers 4–1 and Rockets 4–2. The Jazz then met Michael Jordan and the Chicago Bulls in the Finals, losing the series 4–2, with the last two games decided in the final seconds (scores of 90–88 and 90–86).

During the off-season, the Jazz made no changes to the roster. As the 1997–98 season neared, they were expected to be contenders for the championship again. However, Stockton suffered a serious knee injury before the season, and missed the first 18 games, in which the Jazz went 11–7.

On February 17, 1998, at the NBA trade deadline, the Jazz consummated a trade with the Orlando Magic, to acquire center Rony Seikaly in an attempt to bolster their center rotation. However, Seikaly refused to report within the mandated 48 hours required by NBA rules. From there, the trade was called off, and the Jazz took Chris Morris & Greg Foster back. Rumors had Seikaly with a serious foot injury; however, Seikaly insisted the Jazz torpedoed the deal and that he wanted to play for them; however, Seikaly's refusal to report effectively killed the deal. After the trade was off, Orlando pivoted and traded Seikaly to the New Jersey Nets, where he would play a total of 18 games over the next 1 1/2 seasons before retiring from the NBA.

The Jazz played better after Stockton returned from his early-season injury. The team went 51–13 over the last 64 games, to finish at 62–20, and won the Midwest Division and received home-court advantage for the playoffs.

In the playoffs, the Jazz beat Houston 3–2, and San Antonio 4–1, to advance to the Western Conference Finals for the third straight year. Utah, with a veteran roster of Stockton, Malone and Hornacek, faced a Los Angeles Lakers team led by superstar Shaquille O'Neal, guards Eddie Jones, Nick Van Exel and a young Kobe Bryant. The Jazz set the tone for the series with a win in Game 1, 112–77. Game 2, a 99–95 Jazz victory, and Games 3 and 4 in Los Angeles were decided by an average of 7.5 points. The Jazz swept the Lakers and earned a second consecutive trip to the NBA Finals.

In the 1998 NBA Finals (again against the Chicago Bulls), the Jazz took Game 1 at home, 88–85 in overtime. However, the Bulls overcame a slow start to win Game 2, 93–88, easily took Game 3, 96–54, and won Game 4, 86–82, to lead the series 3–1. The Jazz fought back and won Game 5 on the road, 83–81, to trail 3–2 in the series, with Game 6 (and a Game 7 if needed) in Salt Lake City. The Jazz held a lead in most of Game 6, but the Bulls rallied, and in the last seconds of the game, Michael Jordan stole the ball from Malone on the final Jazz possession and then pushed off of Bryon Russell and made a jump shot to win the game, 87–86, and the series for Chicago, 4–2.

==== 1998–2003: Final years of Stockton/Malone ====
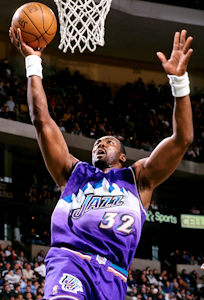
Karl Malone

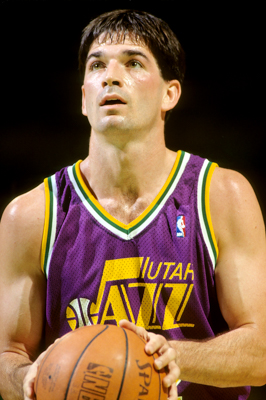
John Stockton

In the 1999 season, shortened to 50 games due to a lockout, the Jazz finished 37–13, tied with the Spurs for the best record in the league. They defeated the Sacramento Kings in five games in the first round of the playoffs. However, they lost in the second round of the playoffs to the Portland Trail Blazers. Despite yet another disappointment, Malone was awarded his second MVP.

During the 1999–2000 season, the Jazz finished 55–27 and won the Midwest Division but again struggled in the postseason, and lost to the Portland Trail Blazers in the second round. In the off-season, Hornacek retired and Howard Eisley was traded in a four-team deal that brought in Donyell Marshall. They selected high-school basketball star DeShawn Stevenson in the first round of the 2000 NBA draft.

In the 2000–01 season, the Jazz posted a 53–29 record, but lost in the playoffs, surrendering a 2–0 series lead in the first round of the playoffs to the Dallas Mavericks to lose the series 3–2. This was their earliest exit from the playoffs since the 1994–95 season.

In the 2001–02 season, Andrei Kirilenko made his rookie debut, averaging 10.7 points, 4.9 rebounds, and 1.91 blocks per game. The team started the season slowly, with a record of 16–15 over the first two months, and finished 12–13 to go 44–38 overall. They lost to the Sacramento Kings 3–1 in the first round of the playoffs.

Before the 2002–03 season, Marshall and Russell moved on to other teams. Matt Harpring was brought over from the Philadelphia 76ers, and took over the starting forward spot next to Malone, averaging 17.6 points and 6.6 rebounds, the best numbers of his career. The Jazz approached 50 wins going into the playoffs, but ended up falling short with a record of 47–35. They faced the Sacramento Kings in the playoffs again, and lost in a five-game first-round series, 4–1.

After the season, Stockton retired, and Malone left as a free agent to join the Los Angeles Lakers.

=== 2003–2005: Post-Malone/Stockton era ===
Without Malone and Stockton, the faces of the Jazz franchise, the team lacked foundation as it went into the 2003–04 season. They were expected to finish near the bottom of the NBA by several NBA preview magazines, including Sports Illustrated. The Jazz finished with a 42–40 record. The team featured several unheralded players who emerged as key contributors, including Kirilenko, Raja Bell, and Carlos Arroyo. In particular, Kirilenko demonstrated versatility on both offense and defense and earned a spot in the All-Star Game. The Jazz missed the playoffs by one game to the Denver Nuggets, ending a streak of 20 consecutive seasons in the playoffs. Jerry Sloan finished second in the voting for the NBA Coach of the Year Award, losing to Hubie Brown of the Memphis Grizzlies.

During the off-season, the team made moves to change the roster; they acquired Carlos Boozer and Mehmet Okur as free agents and re-signed Carlos Arroyo and Gordan Giricek to extensions.

The 2004–05 season was marked by injuries, first to Arroyo and Raúl López, and later to Boozer and Kirilenko, which were a large part of the team's fall to the bottom of the division. When healthy, Boozer averaged 17.8 points and 9.0 rebounds in 51 games. The Jazz ended the 2004–05 season 26–56, their worst since the 1981–82 season.

=== 2005–2010: The Williams and Boozer era ===
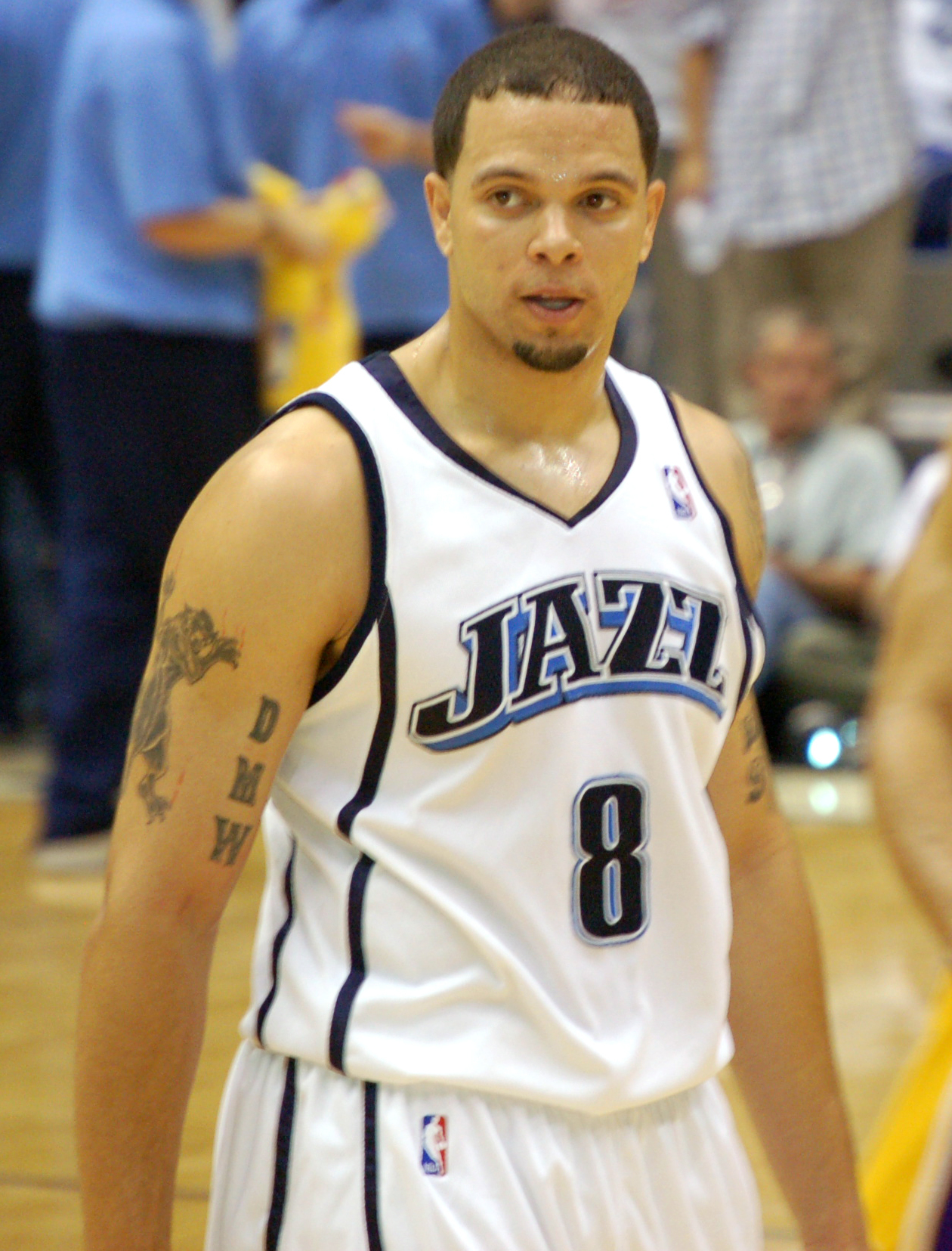
Deron Williams

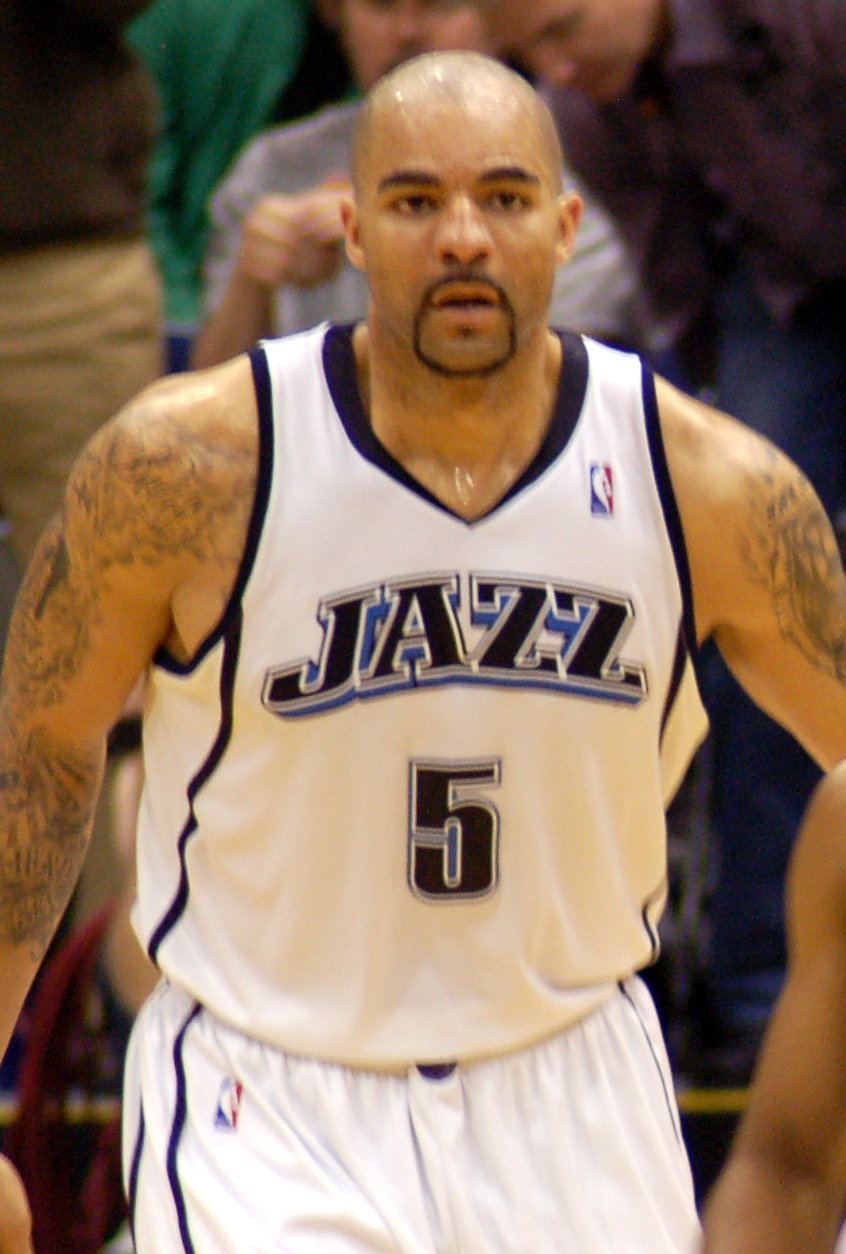
Carlos Boozer

In 2005 the Utah Jazz acquired Deron Williams with the third overall draft pick but faced challenges as injuries plagued key players like Carlos Boozer, Gordan Giricek, and Andrei Kirilenko. The Jazz narrowly missed the playoffs, finishing 41–41, and saw veteran Greg Ostertag retire.

The 2006 offseason brought strong draft picks, including Paul Millsap and Ronnie Brewer, and a trade for veteran Derek Fisher. Improved play in the 2006–07 season saw the Jazz finish 51–31, with All-Star nods for Boozer and Mehmet Okur. Despite internal tension with Kirilenko, the Jazz advanced to the Western Conference Finals but were overpowered by the San Antonio Spurs, who later won the NBA championship.

In 2007, the Jazz continued to build momentum but were marred by off-court stories. Controversy arose after Kirilenko led his Russian national team to a win in EuroBasket 2007 (the European championship), a tournament in which he was named MVP. After that, Kirilenko posted on a blog that he wished to be traded from the Jazz and would be willing to walk away from his contract. However, no trade was made and he remained with the team. Elsewhere, Derek Fisher was allowed to walk off the team after his daughter was diagnosed with eye cancer, leading Fisher to return to the Lakers. Nevertheless, key acquisitions like Kyle Korver bolstered the team, which secured a 54–28 record in 2007–08. After defeating Houston in the playoffs, they fell to the Los Angeles Lakers in the second round.

The 2008–09 season was marred by injuries to stars like Williams, Boozer, and Okur, alongside the death of team owner Larry H. Miller. Despite a strong home record, they finished 48–34 and were eliminated in the first playoff round by the Lakers. Williams emerged as one of the league's elite point guards, averaging 19.4 points and 10.8 assists, despite playing the entire season with a lingering ankle injury.

In 2009 the Jazz drafted Eric Maynor and added undrafted rookie Wesley Matthews. A midseason trade of Ronnie Brewer, criticized by Williams, allowed Matthews to step into a starting role. Boozer returned to form, Korver set an NBA three-point shooting record, and Williams made his first All-Star appearance. The Jazz concluded the 2009–10 season 53–29 but suffered critical injuries to Kirilenko and Okur in the playoffs. Despite overcoming Denver in the first round, they were swept by the Lakers, marking their third consecutive playoff exit at the hands of Los Angeles.

=== 2010–2017: Rebuilding and the post-Jerry Sloan era ===
==== 2010–2013: Departure of Williams & Boozer, Jefferson/Millsap duo ====
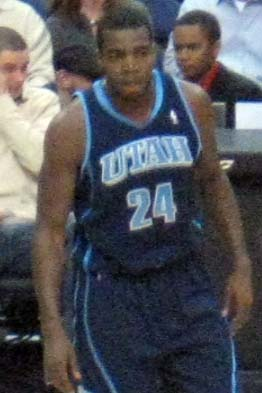
Paul Millsap in 2010

The Jazz's 2010 NBA draft selections included Gordon Hayward (No. 9 overall) and Jeremy Evans (No. 55 overall). In free agency, Carlos Boozer signed a five-year, $80 million deal with the Chicago Bulls on July 7, 2010, later converted into a sign-and-trade yielding Utah a $13 million trade exception. The Bulls also signed Kyle Korver to a reported three-year, $13 million deal, while Wesley Matthews joined the Portland Trail Blazers with a five-year, $33 million offer sheet. To counter roster losses, Utah acquired Al Jefferson from Minnesota using the Boozer trade exception and signed Raja Bell to a three-year, $10 million contract.

The Jazz rebranded in 2010, reverting to their "music note" logo and unveiling new uniforms. Restricted free-agent Kyrylo Fesenko accepted a $1 million qualifying offer, while Francisco Elson and Earl Watson joined for the 2010–11 season. The team began the season strongly but faltered mid-season, prompting the resignation of longtime head coach Jerry Sloan on February 10, 2011. Tyrone Corbin replaced Sloan, while Jeff Hornacek joined as an assistant coach.

On February 23, 2011, the Jazz traded star Deron Williams to the New Jersey Nets for Derrick Favors, Devin Harris, and two first-round picks. Concerns about retaining Williams long-term influenced the trade. The Jazz missed the playoffs for the first time since 2006, finishing the season 39–43. In the 2011 draft, they selected Enes Kanter and Alec Burks. Following the lockout-shortened 2011–12 season, Utah traded Mehmet Okur, and Andrei Kirilenko opted to remain in Russia. They signed veterans Josh Howard and Jamaal Tinsley.

During the 2012 offseason, the Jazz traded Devin Harris for Marvin Williams and selected Kevin Murphy in the draft. They added Mo Williams and Randy Foye, re-signed Evans and Tinsley, and saw longtime Jazz player C.J. Miles leave for Cleveland. Dennis Lindsey became general manager, while Scott Layden departed for the San Antonio Spurs.

Before the 2013–14 season, Paul Millsap and Al Jefferson left in free agency, joining Atlanta and Charlotte, respectively. Jeff Hornacek became head coach of the Phoenix Suns. The Jazz were officially eliminated from playoff contention on March 14, 2014, after a 96–87 loss to the Los Angeles Clippers.

==== 2013–2017: Hayward/Gobert era ====
On June 27, 2013, Rudy Gobert was selected with the 27th overall pick in the 2013 NBA draft by the Denver Nuggets. He was later traded on draft night to the Utah Jazz. On July 6, he signed his rookie scale contract with the Jazz and joined them for the 2013 NBA Summer League.

On May 20, 2014, the Jazz earned the 5th pick in the 2014 NBA draft at the NBA Draft Lottery, with which they chose 18-year-old Australian point guard Dante Exum. They also had the 23rd pick from a trade with the Golden State Warriors and their own pick in the second round (the 35th pick overall). With the 23rd pick they selected Rodney Hood from Duke University. The 35th pick was used to select Jarnell Stokes, who was subsequently traded to the Memphis Grizzlies for a future second-round pick.

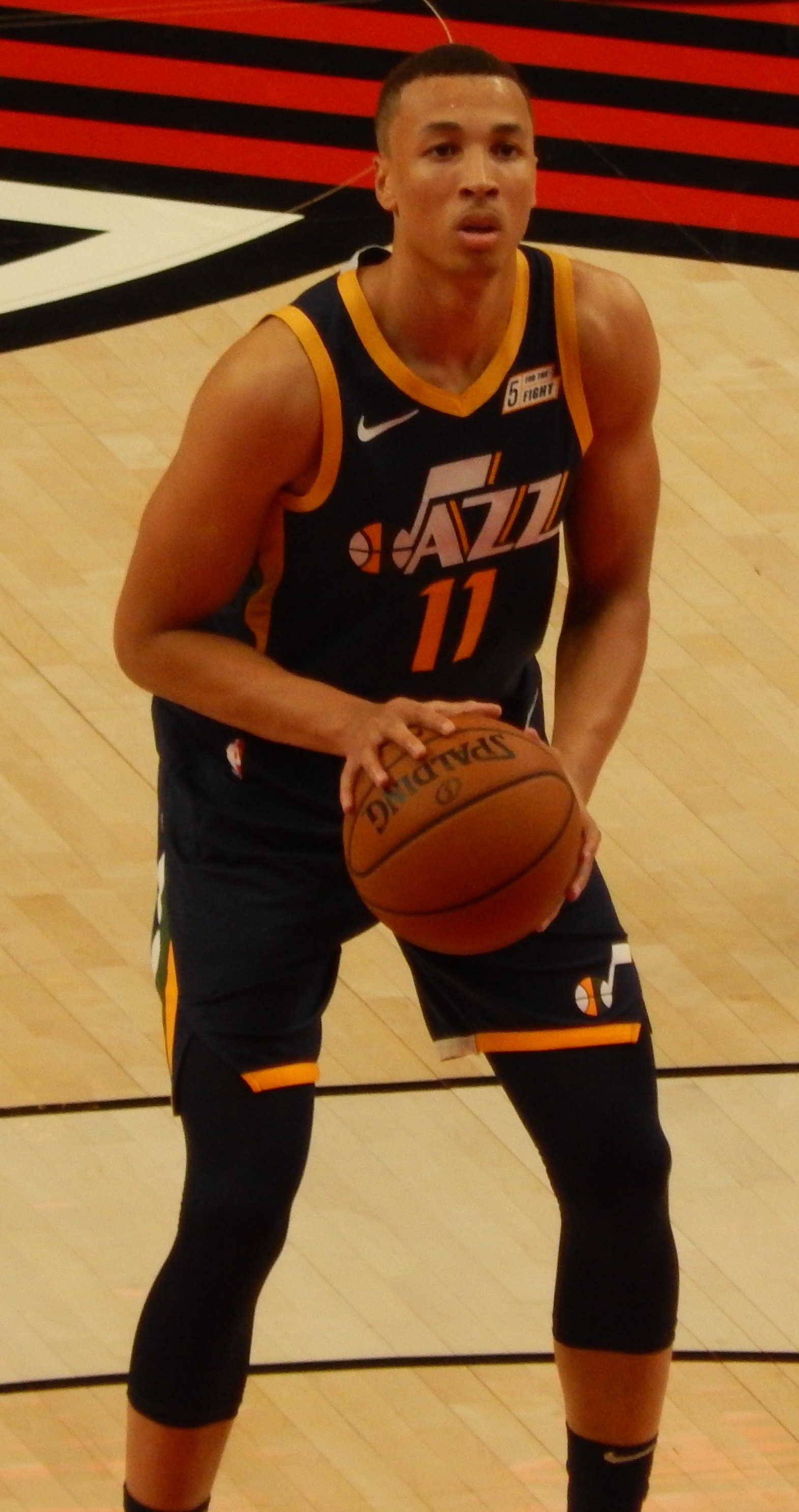
Dante Exum was drafted fifth overall in 2014

On June 6, 2014, Atlanta Hawks assistant coach Quin Snyder was named the eighth head coach in team history. Snyder signed a three-year contract with a team option for a fourth. He replaced Tyrone Corbin. Before joining the Utah Jazz, Snyder previously served as an NBA assistant coach for the Atlanta Hawks, Los Angeles Clippers, Philadelphia 76ers, and Los Angeles Lakers.

The Jazz ended the 2015–16 season with a win–loss record of 40–42, good for ninth place in the Western Conference; however, the team failed to qualify to play in the NBA Playoffs by one game.

The Jazz finished 51–31 during the 2016–17 season and qualified to play in the NBA Playoffs as the Western Conference's fifth seed. They defeated the Los Angeles Clippers in seven games in the first round for the team's first playoff series win since 2010. The team advanced to play the defending Western Conference champion Golden State Warriors in the conference semifinals where they were swept 4–0, ending their season. Gordon Hayward and Rudy Gobert had breakout seasons in 2017. After putting together several solid seasons, Hayward was named an NBA All-Star, while Gobert was named to the NBA Defensive First Team and All NBA Second Team.

Hayward left the Jazz to sign with the Boston Celtics as a free agent on July 4, 2017, announcing his decision in a letter published by The Players' Tribune. Hayward's contract was finalized on July 14, 2017.

=== 2017–2022: The Gobert and Mitchell era ===
==== 2017: Donovan Mitchell arrives ====
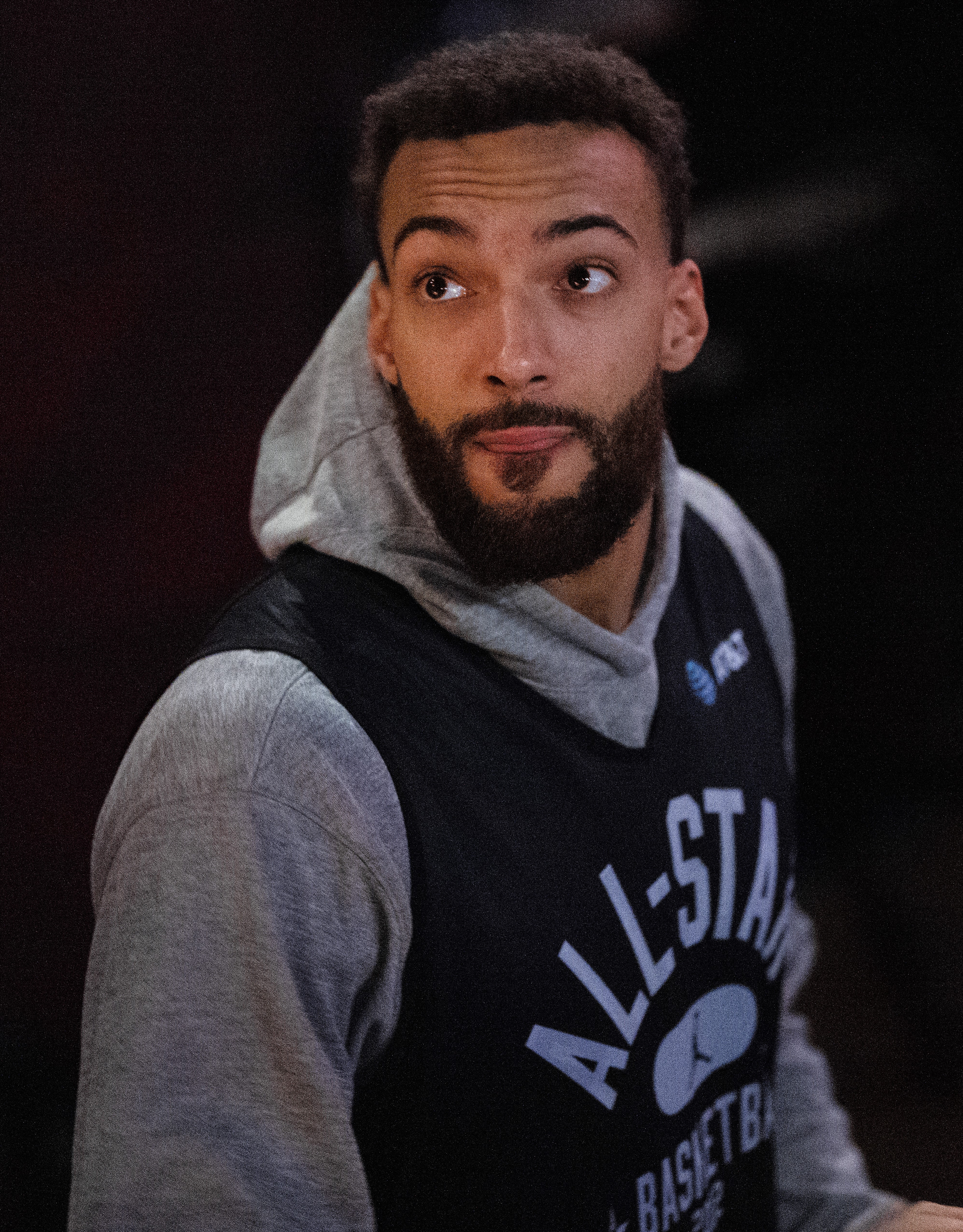
Rudy Gobert

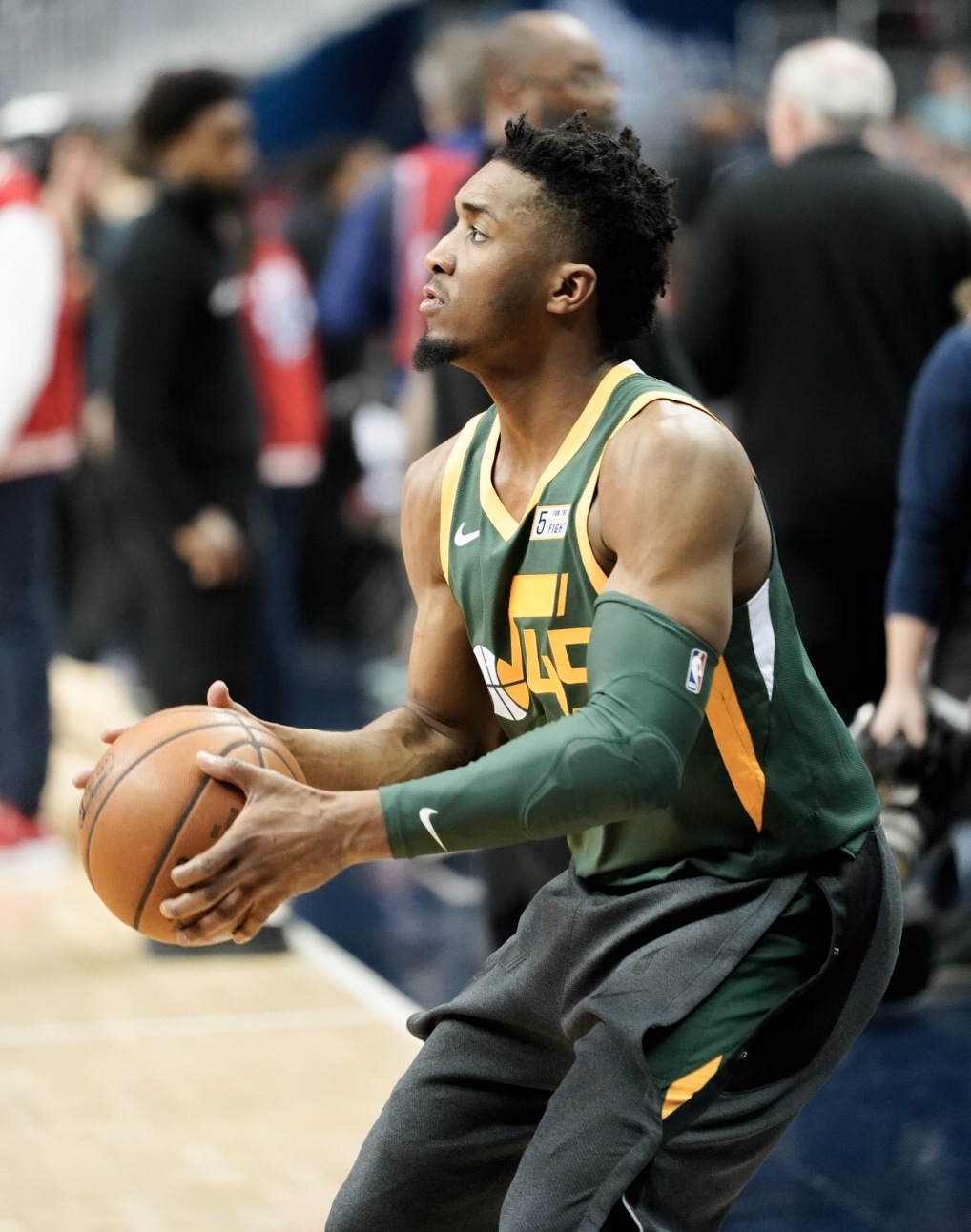
Donovan Mitchell

On June 22, 2017, Donovan Mitchell was selected with the 13th overall pick in the 2017 NBA draft by the Denver Nuggets, who immediately traded Mitchell's rights to the Jazz in exchange for Trey Lyles. The Jazz also acquired veteran Ricky Rubio to play the point guard position.

The Jazz began the 2017–18 season poorly, with an injury to Gobert and a lack of scoring leaving them with a 17–21 record by the end of December. In the second half of the season, the Jazz made rookie Mitchell a starter, and he subsequently led the team and all rookies in the league in points scored. Mitchell went on to break the record for the most three-pointers ever made by a rookie. The team improved drastically as a scoring team, and with the return of Gobert and improved play of Rubio, the Jazz finished the season winning 32 of their last 45 games and ended with a 48–34 record. The late-season burst earned the Jazz a no. 5 seed in the 2018 NBA playoffs, where they went on to beat the Oklahoma City Thunder 4–2 in the first round before losing in the Second Round to the Houston Rockets in five games. After the season, Rudy Gobert was named NBA Defensive Player of the Year, Donovan Mitchell was runner-up in the Rookie of the Year voting, Quin Snyder was runner-up Coach of the Year, and general manager Dennis Lindsey was runner-up Executive of the Year.

==== 2018–2020: Regular-season success; playoff disappointment ====
The 2018–19 season began with promise for the Jazz after the surprising success of the 2017–18 season. However, by the end of November they were 11–12 and in 10th place in the Western Conference standings. This continued in December as Mitchell struggled with his shot, and the Jazz record continued to be around the break-even mark.

However, in the New Year, Mitchell's performance improved as he was averaging 27.7 points in January and 25.4 in February, and the Jazz improved down the stretch, closing out the season with a 32–13 run to finish 50–32 and earned the fifth seed in the Western Conference playoffs. In the first round, they played against the Houston Rockets, who were on a run of their own, going 33–14 in 2019 after a slow start. Houston proved to be too much for the Jazz, taking the series 4–1.

On May 10, 2019, the Jazz announced the promotion of Dennis Lindsey to executive vice president of basketball operations and Justin Zanik to general manager.

During the 2019 off-season, the Jazz added several players by trade and free agency, including Jeff Green, Mike Conley Jr., Ed Davis, Bojan Bogdanović, and Emmanuel Mudiay, while Derrick Favors, Kyle Korver, Jae Crowder, Raul Neto, and Ricky Rubio left the team. Sports media viewed the changes as positive.

On the opening day of the 2019–20 season, a press conference was held, announcing that Utah would host the 2023 NBA All-Star Game. This would be the second time the Jazz hosted this event; the first was in 1993.

On December 24, 2019, the Jazz announced that they had waived forward Jeff Green, signed G-League free agent Rayjon Tucker, and traded Dante Exum to the Cleveland Cavaliers for shooting guard Jordan Clarkson, whose trade in particular was seen as overwhelmingly positive by the media, if also bittersweet for Jazz fans who hoped that Exum would eventually mature into the franchise cornerstone he was drafted to be.

On January 30, 2020, Gobert and Mitchell were named reserves for the 2020 NBA All-Star Game. This marked the first time since 2007 that multiple Utah Jazz players had been selected to the All-Star game, and the first time since 2000 that multiple Jazz players had actually appeared in the game (Mehmet Okur had replaced an injured Carlos Boozer in 2007). In March 2020, Gobert and Mitchell were diagnosed with COVID-19, making the Jazz the first major sporting franchise in North America to be directly affected by the disease, and resulting in the suspension of all remaining NBA games of the season.

After the suspension of the 2019–20 NBA season, the Jazz were one of the 22 teams invited to the NBA Bubble to participate in the final eight games of the regular season. The Jazz were mediocre in the eight seeding games, posting a 3–5 record. However, this allowed them to lock up the Western Conference sixth seed and a favorable matchup with the Denver Nuggets. In game 1, Donovan Mitchell achieved the third-highest single-game scoring total in playoff history (behind only Michael Jordan and Elgin Baylor) with 57 points, but the Jazz lost to the Nuggets in overtime. Mitchell's brilliant play continued through the series as the Jazz won the next three games, two of them by lopsided margins; however, they blew their 3–1 lead and lost at the buzzer in game 7 of the series.

Within hours of the Jazz's playoff loss, Mitchell agreed to a five-year, $195 million contract extension that would keep him in Utah. On December 20, 2020, Rudy Gobert signed a five-year, $205 million contract extension, the third-largest contract in NBA history and the largest ever for a center. During the 2020 off-season, the Jazz traded away backup centers Tony Bradley and Ed Davis, re-signed Jordan Clarkson to a four-year, $51.52 million contract, and re-acquired Derrick Favors from the Pelicans to serve as a more reliable post presence off the bench. In the 2020 NBA draft, the Jazz selected Kansas center Udoka Azubuike 27th overall in the first round and Syracuse forward Elijah Hughes 39th overall in the second round.

==== 2020–2021: Three NBA All-Stars; playoff contention ====
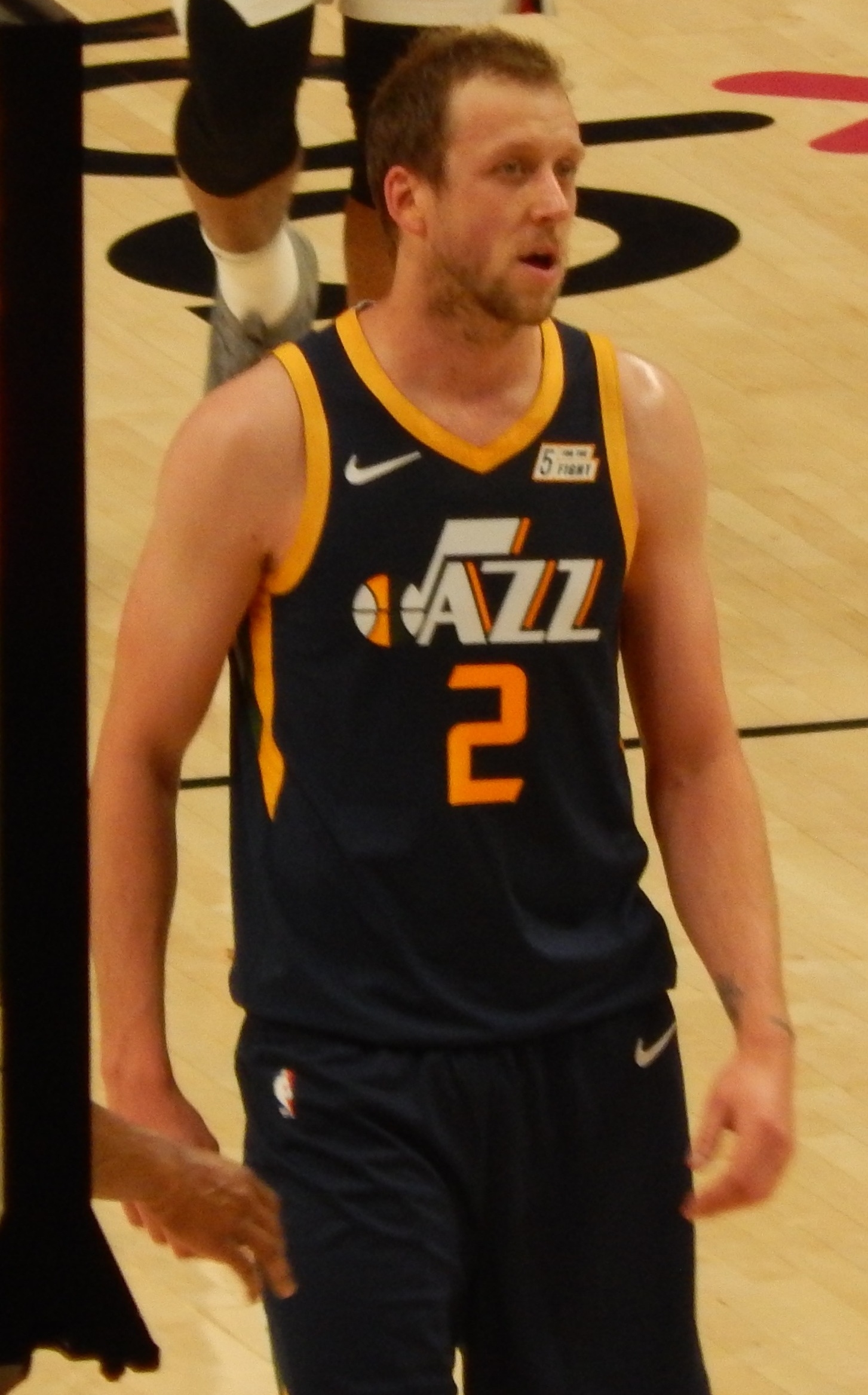
Joe Ingles was on the Jazz for eight years from 2014 to 2022. He is the Jazz's all-time leader in three point field goals

On October 28, 2020, the Utah Jazz organization announced that Ryan Smith, an Oregon native (now based in Utah) and the billionaire co-founder of Qualtrics, had purchased the team from the Miller family. Smith agreed at the time of the sale to honor the terms of the legacy trust into which the Millers had placed the Jazz organization, including the provision requiring the team to be kept in Utah. On April 16, 2021, the Jazz announced that Dwyane Wade had purchased a minority ownership stake in the team and was expected to have hands-on involvement in team operations.

The Jazz began their 2020–21 season with an NBA-best and franchise-record 23–5 start, with Donovan Mitchell leading the team in scoring and Jordan Clarkson emerging as the frontrunner for Sixth Man of the Year. On February 17, 2021, head coach Quin Snyder was announced as the head coach of the Western Conference team for the 2021 NBA All-Star Game, becoming the first Jazz coach so honored since Frank Layden in 1984. On February 23, Donovan Mitchell and Rudy Gobert were announced as All-Star reserves for the second consecutive season, with Mitchell also slated to compete in the three-point contest. On March 5, Mike Conley was selected as an All-Star reserve for the first time in his career, replacing the injured Devin Booker. Conley was also announced as Booker's replacement in the three-point contest. This marked the second time in franchise history (the first being 1989 with John Stockton, Karl Malone, and Mark Eaton) that three Jazz players had been selected as All-Stars.

On February 24, 2021, former Jazz forward Elijah Millsap alleged via Twitter that Dennis Lindsey (then the team's general manager) had made a racist remark to him during an interview in 2015. Both Lindsey and Quin Snyder, who was present for the conversation, adamantly denied the allegations. The Jazz subsequently announced that independent counsel had been retained by the organization to investigate whether the allegations were true. On March 16, the NBA announced that this investigation had concluded that there was no proof Lindsey had made the comments, citing the fact that nobody associated with the meeting could corroborate Millsap's story (including Millsap's own agent, who confirmed that Millsap had never mentioned the incident to him at the time). The Jazz organization subsequently cleared Lindsey of any wrongdoing.

On May 16, 2021, the Jazz defeated the Sacramento Kings 121–99 to clinch sole possession of the best regular season record in the NBA for the first time in franchise history (the Jazz had tied for the best record in 1998 and 1999). At the conclusion of the regular season, Jordan Clarkson was named Sixth Man of the Year, becoming the first Jazz player to win the award and winning over his own teammate, Joe Ingles, who was runner-up.

In the first round of the 2021 NBA playoffs, the Jazz played the eighth-seeded Memphis Grizzlies. After losing game 1 in a surprising home upset with Donovan Mitchell held out due to lingering injury concerns, the Jazz won the next four games to advance to the Western Conference semifinals. Mitchell shot an impressive 11-16 from the field during game 5, scoring 30 points and recording 10 assists to help the Jazz seal the series. In the second round, the Jazz played the fourth-seeded Los Angeles Clippers. Despite winning the first two games at home, the Jazz were eliminated from the playoffs after the Clippers won the next four games.

The Jazz regressed somewhat during the 2021–22 season; while Mitchell and Gobert were once again named All-Stars, the team did not have the same regular season success. Still, the Jazz posted a 49–33 record and made the playoffs as a 5th seed. In the first round, they faced the Dallas Mavericks. After winning game 1 in Dallas, the Jazz struggled and lost the series 4–2.

=== 2022–present: The post Gobert–Mitchell era ===
==== 2022–present: Arrival of Lauri Markkanen ====
On July 1, 2022, the Jazz traded three-time NBA Defensive Player of the Year Award winner Rudy Gobert to the Minnesota Timberwolves in exchange for Malik Beasley, Patrick Beverley, Jarred Vanderbilt, Leandro Bolmaro, Walker Kessler (the 22nd selection in the 2022 NBA draft), four future first-round draft picks, and a pick swap. On August 25, 2022, Beverley was traded to the Los Angeles Lakers in exchange for Stanley Johnson and Talen Horton-Tucker. On September 1, 2022, the Jazz traded three-time All-Star guard Donovan Mitchell to the Cleveland Cavaliers in exchange for Collin Sexton, Lauri Markkanen, Ochai Agbaji (the Cavaliers' top selection and the 14th pick in the 2022 NBA draft), three future unprotected first-round draft picks, and two pick swaps.

On June 5, 2022, Quin Snyder announced his resignation as head coach of the Jazz. On June 29, the Jazz organization announced that Boston Celtics assistant coach Will Hardy had been hired as Snyder's replacement.

On February 2, 2023, Lauri Markkanen was selected to appear as a reserve in the 2023 NBA All-Star Game, his first career All-Star selection. On February 10, it was further announced that Markkanen had been selected as an All-Star starter as a result of injuries to Stephen Curry and Zion Williamson. Markkanen also participated in the Three-Point Contest during All-Star weekend. In addition, the Jazz fielded a three-player team of Collin Sexton, Walker Kessler, and Jordan Clarkson in the NBA's re-formatted team skills challenge. The three Jazzmen ultimately won the event.

On February 8, 2023, the Jazz traded Malik Beasley and Jarred Vanderbilt to the Los Angeles Lakers and Mike Conley Jr., Nickeil Alexander-Walker, and two future second-round picks to the Minnesota Timberwolves as part of a three-team trade. In return, the Jazz received Russell Westbrook, Juan Toscano-Anderson, and Damian Jones along with the Lakers' 2027 first-round pick. The Jazz subsequently negotiated a buyout of Westbrook's contract and waived him, allowing him to sign with the Los Angeles Clippers.

The Jazz finished the 2022–23 season 37–45 and failed to qualify for the NBA playoffs. At the conclusion of the season, Lauri Markkanen received the NBA Most Improved Player Award.

The Utah Jazz, led by Markkanen, finished the next season 31–51, missing the playoffs once again. A highlight of the season was Keyonte George's appearance on the All-Rookie second team. The next season, Russell Westbrook was acquired and waived once again by the Jazz during the offseason. They also signed sharpshooting veteran Patty Mills.

2024–25 saw the Jazz go 17–65, setting a new franchise worst, and became the final NBA team to lose 60 games or more in a single season.

Despite their poor record, the Jazz would end up with the fifth pick in the 2025 NBA draft, using it to select Ace Bailey. On July 2, the Jazz signed for Walter Clayton Jr. alongside with Bailey.

On February 3, 2026, the Jazz traded Walter Clayton Jr., Kyle Anderson, Taylor Hendricks, Georges Niang and three first-round draft picks and they acquired Memphis Grizzlies players for Jaren Jackson Jr., John Konchar, Jock Landale, and Vince Williams Jr.

The 2025–26 season was a slight improvement from the previous year: the Jazz went 22–60 with Markkanen only appearing in 42 games and Keyonte George breaking out to become a 20-point scorer.

In the 2026 NBA Draft, the Jazz selected Darryn Peterson from the University of Kansas with the No. 2 overall pick, the highest draft selection in franchise history since Darrell Griffith was taken second overall in 1980. The 6-foot-5 guard averaged 20.2 points per game in his freshman season at Kansas and was selected after the Washington Wizards took AJ Dybantsa first overall.

On July 1, 2026, the Jazz traded center Walker Kessler to the Los Angeles Lakers for unprotected first-round picks in 2031 and 2033 and first-round pick swaps in 2028 and 2030. Kessler, who had turned down a five-year, approximately $140 million extension from Utah, signed a four-year, $130 million contract with Los Angeles.

== Season-by-season record ==
List of the last five seasons completed by the Jazz. For the full season-by-season history, see List of Utah Jazz seasons.

Note: GP = Games played, W = Wins, L = Losses, W–L% = Winning percentage

Season	GP	W	L	W–L%	Finish	Playoffs
2021–22	82	49	33	.598	1st, Northwest	Lost in first round, 2–4 (Mavericks)
2022–23	82	37	45	.451	4th, Northwest	Did not qualify
2023–24	82	31	51	.378	4th, Northwest	Did not qualify
2024–25	82	17	65	.207	5th, Northwest	Did not qualify
2025–26	82	22	60	.268	5th, Northwest	Did not qualify

== Arenas ==
- Loyola Field House (1974–1975)
- Municipal Auditorium (1974–1975)
- Louisiana Superdome (1975–1979)
- Salt Palace (1979–1991)
- Delta Center (Note: Formerly known as EnergySolutions Arena (2006–2015) and Vivint Arena (2015–2023).) (1991–present)

== Mascot ==
Jazz Bear is the club's mascot. He was introduced to the league on November 4, 1994. He usually excites the crowd during halftime by coming onto the court on a motorbike.

== Logos and uniforms ==
Previous logos of the Utah Jazz
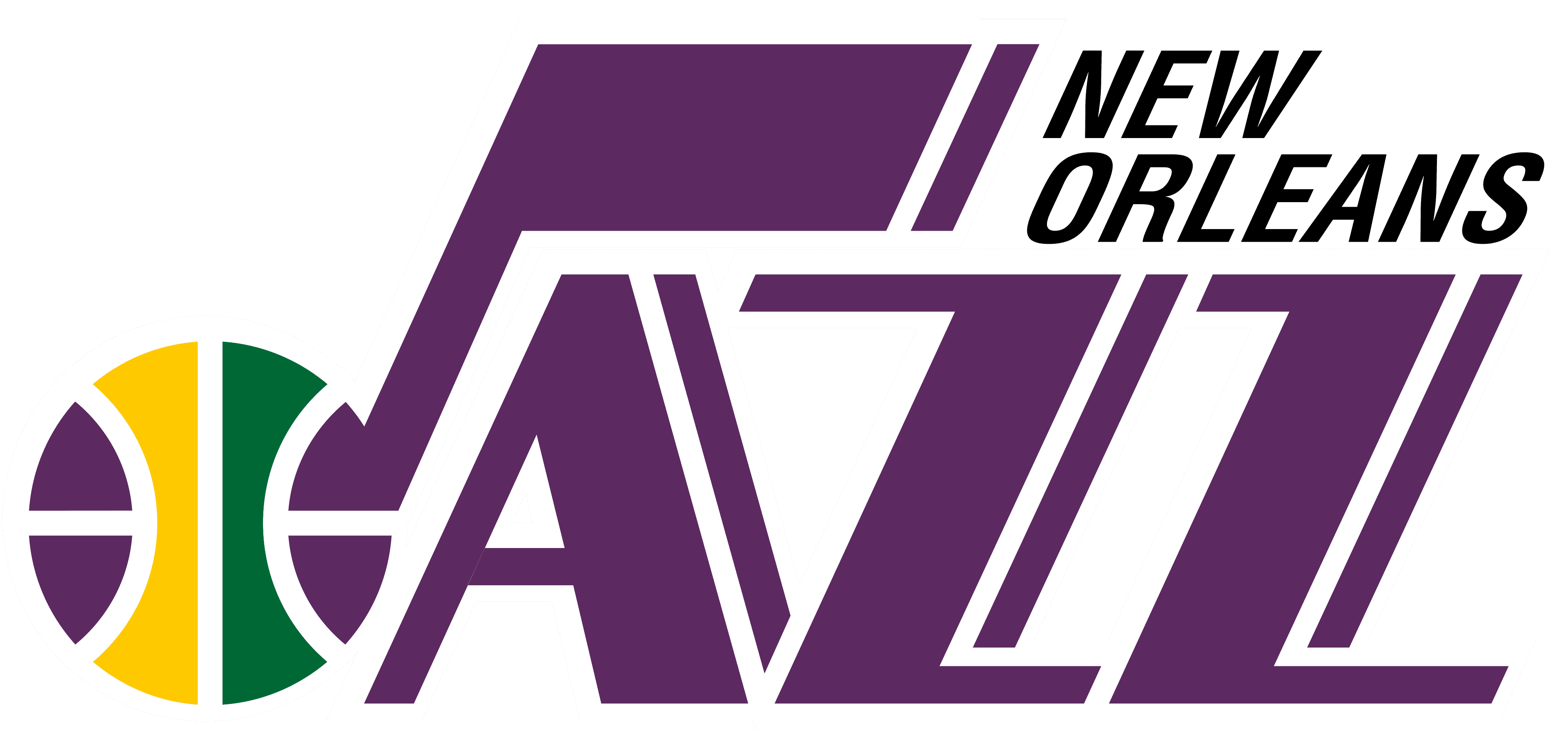
Primary logo, 1974–1979

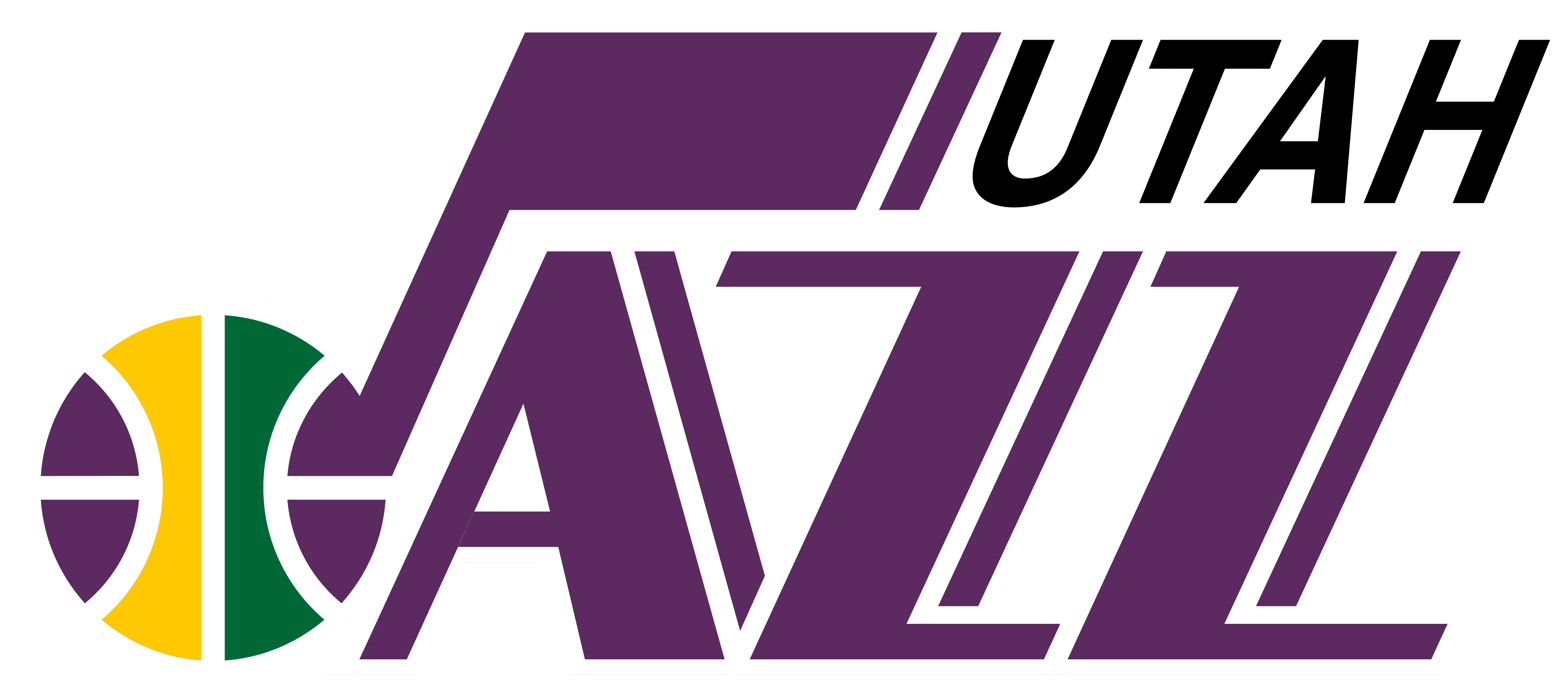
Primary logo, 1979–1996

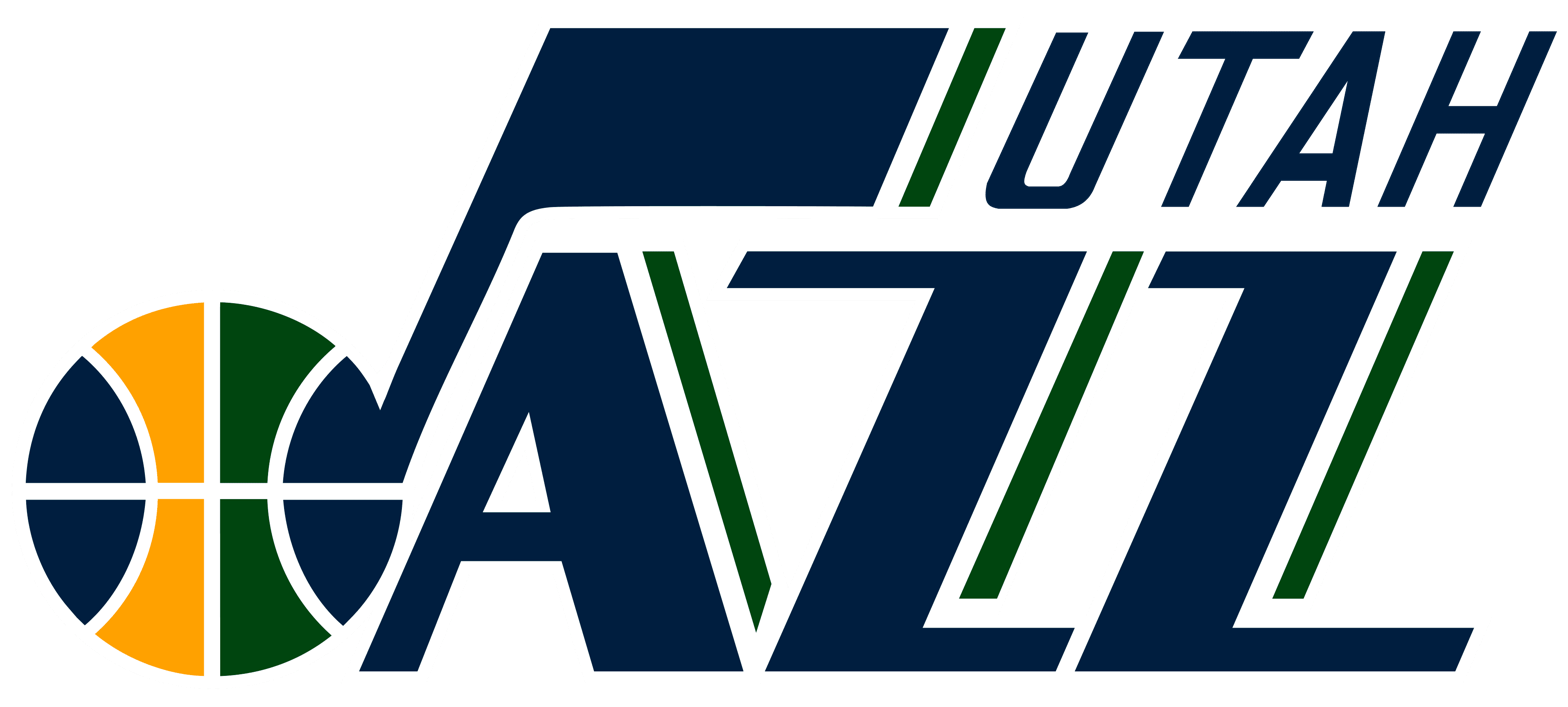
Primary logo, 2016–2022

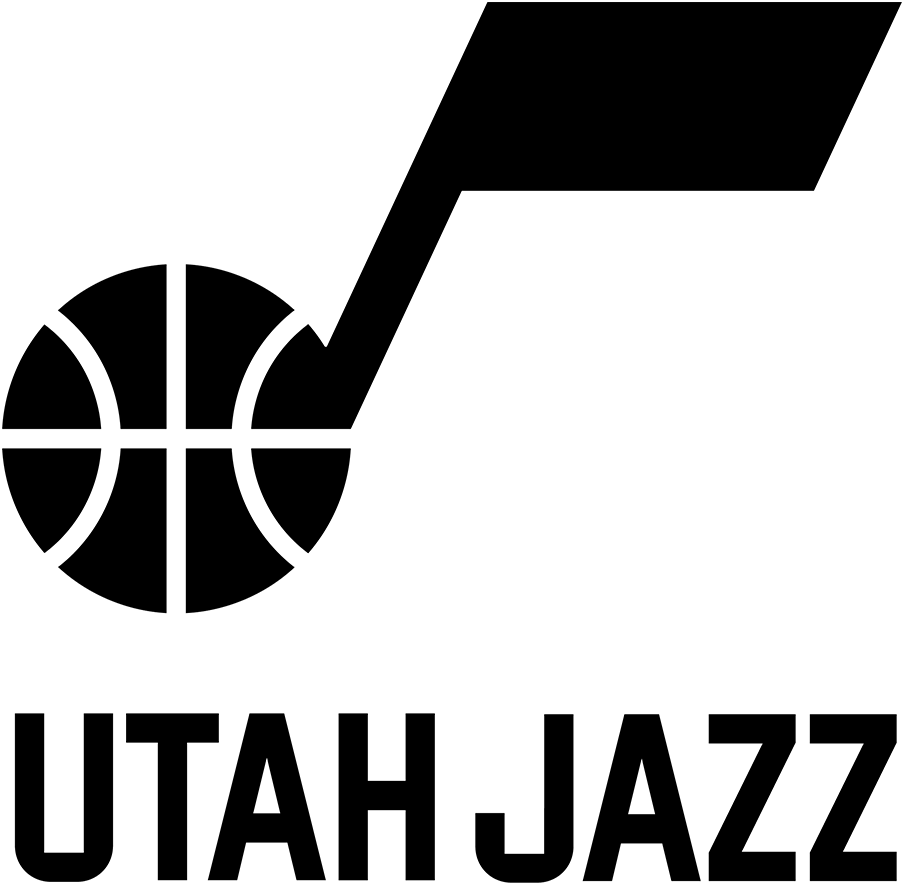
Primary logo, 2022–2025

=== New Orleans Jazz ===
The name "Jazz" and the "J" musical note in the logo pay homage to New Orleans as the origin and cultural center of the jazz music genre. The franchise's original colors of purple, gold, and green are those most associated with Mardi Gras in New Orleans. During the Jazz's time in New Orleans from 1974 to 1979, the home uniform was white with gold trim, a purple "Jazz" script, and purple numbers. The road uniform was purple with gold trim, a white "Jazz" script, and white numbers.

=== Utah Jazz ===
==== Mardi Gras colors: 1979–1996 ====
When the team moved to Utah in 1979, the Jazz made slight changes to their uniforms. The home uniforms remained the same, with the word "Utah" added to the center chest logo in the 1986–87 season. In 1981, the road uniforms were changed to dark green, with the aforementioned Jazz logo on the center chest and gold numbers. For the 1984–85 season, they were changed back to purple, this time with gold numbers and white trim, along with the addition of the word 'Utah' on the logo. These uniforms were worn until the 1995–96 season. The green jerseys were worn for St. Patrick's Day in the 1985–86 season.

==== Purple mountains: 1996–2004 ====
For the 1996–97 season, the Jazz drastically updated their logos and uniforms, with a new color scheme of purple (slightly lighter from the previous shade), copper and turquoise. The logo, designed by former NBA creative director Tom O'Grady, was based on the 1993 All-Star Game logo. Their new uniform set featured a silhouette of the Wasatch Range on the center chest, with a stylish new Jazz script, and purple and turquoise details. On the road purple jersey, the white mountain range gradually fades to purple just above the numbers, which are white, with copper interior trim and teal outlining. On the home white jersey, the numbers are purple, with white interior trim and teal outlining. The Jazz wore these uniforms until the 2003–04 season.

The Jazz also introduced an alternate black uniform in the 1998–99 season, with the Jazz script on the center chest, but without the Wasatch Range silhouette. On this jersey, both the Jazz script and numbers are white, with purple interior trim and copper outlining, and copper side panels. This uniform was worn until the 2003–04 season.

==== Navy and powder blue: 2004–2010 ====
In the 2004–05 season, the Jazz once again updated their color scheme, logos and uniforms. The new color scheme, which the team used until the end of the 2009–10 season, consisted of navy blue, powder blue, silver and purple, though the latter color was only used on the primary and alternate logos. The team logo remained substantially the same, with the exception of the new color variation. The new home uniform consisted of an updated "Jazz" script on the center chest in navy blue, with navy numbers, both of which had silver interior trim and powder blue outlining. The new road uniform was navy blue, with a "Utah" script in powder blue on the center chest and powder blue numbers, both of which had silver outlining and white interior trim.

In the 2006–07 season, the Jazz introduced a new alternate powder blue uniform. This uniform, which the team wore until the end of the 2009–10 season, featured a Jazz script identical to the team logo and navy blue numbers below the script, also with silver and white trim. The nameplate on the back of the jersey was navy blue.

The team's original 'J-note' logo was revived in the 2008–09 season, but was only used on television broadcasts and in the team's then-current colors.

==== Return of the 'J-note': 2010–2016 ====
On June 15, 2010, the Jazz unveiled a new logo and color scheme on the team's official website. For the 2010–11 season, the Jazz kept the mountain logo as the primary logo, but in a new color scheme of navy blue, gold, dark green & gray, though the latter color was dropped after the 2015–16 season. The 'J-note' logo returned to its original green-and-gold scheme, but the navy blue was retained. The new uniform set, which was unveiled on August 16, features a design nearly identical to the team's aforementioned 1970s uniform designs, with the following differences: navy blue replacing purple on the road uniform, dark green numerals on the home white jerseys, a V-neck on both the home and road jerseys and side panels on both the home and away jerseys. The new uniforms were a combination of both the old and new styles, with navy blue retained from the most recent color scheme, but the now-famous 'J-note' logo and gold and green were revived.

The Jazz unveiled an alternate jersey on December 9, 2011, that is similar to their road jersey, but swaps the navy and green colors so that the primary color is green, with a navy stripe on the side. This uniform was worn until the 2015–16 season.

==== Modified look; move to Nike: 2016–2022 ====
On May 12, 2016, the Jazz updated their logos and uniforms. The team selected its wordmark logo as its new primary logo, with the addition of the word 'Utah' above the two Z's; because of that, the team discontinued the use of the mountain logo, which had been used since 1996. A new home court design was also unveiled. Home and road uniform modifications included the creation of a new, custom number font. To go along with the new look, two new alternate uniforms were introduced: a modified green alternate, with a "Utah" script arched in white, and a new navy sleeved alternate featuring the white 'J-note' logo on the right breast and numbers on the left breast in gold, with green, gold and white stripes below the chest.

In 2017, as part of the switch to Nike as the NBA's uniform provider, the Jazz made some slight changes to their uniform set. While the white "Association" and navy "Icon" uniforms remained mostly intact, the Jazz retired their green and navy sleeved alternates in favor of a gold "Statement" uniform, featuring the navy 'J-note' logo and green numbers.

===== "Red Rocks" City uniform: 2017–2022 =====
The "City" uniform was inspired from the red rock formations found in Southern Utah, and it featured a gradient of gold, orange, burgundy and black. After a three-season run, the Jazz replaced their original "City" uniform with a similar design, but with the gradient reversed so that it fades to black. NBA guidelines require a new "City" uniform to be released every one to three years.

===== Earned uniforms =====
Also part of the Nike rotation is the "Earned" uniform, which is given only to teams who qualified in the NBA playoffs the previous season. The "Earned" uniform, however, is only used in select seasons, unlike the other uniforms. The 2019 version mirrored that of the "Statement" uniform except with a dark green base and lack of navy elements. The 2021 version was similar but with a light Kelly green base (a nod to the early 1980s green uniforms) and different striping patterns.

==== Black and yellow 'J-note': 2022–2025 ====
The Jazz unveiled new uniforms before the 2022–23 season. As part of the transition, the team brought back the classic 1996–2004 purple "mountain" uniforms as the "City" uniform, along with "Statement" black, "Icon" yellow and "Association" white uniforms. The white uniform features only the J-note logo and numbers in black, the yellow uniform has "Jazz" and numbers in black, and the black uniform has "Utah" and numbers in yellow.

The new black, white, and yellow "remix" uniforms and color scheme was largely received poorly by Jazz fans and media members alike.

==== Modernized purple mountains: 2023–present ====
Starting with the 2023–24 season, the Jazz announced in advance on social media that a "remixed" version of the "mountain" uniforms would replace the classic 1996–2004 version as its "City" uniform; this design features updated mountain gradients, an enlarged "Utah" wordmark in front, and white numbers positioned on the left chest.

Between the 2024–25 and 2025–26 seasons, the Jazz would gradually phase out the black and spotlight yellow uniforms in favor of the modernized "purple mountains" uniforms. For 2024–25, the existing white "Association" and black "Statement" uniforms with yellow trim were retained, but added to the rotation is a black "Statement" uniform featuring the "J-note" in front of a gray Wasatch Range silhouette with purple and sky blue trim, and a purple "City" uniform with "Utah" in white in front of the mountain silhouette. The black and purple "Statement" uniform would debut in January of that season, replacing the black and yellow uniform. For 2025–26, the Jazz would fully adopt the "purple mountains" uniforms. The "Icon" uniform is similar to the 2023–24 "City" uniform but with the addition of black and sky blue trim, and the "Association" uniform followed the same albeit inverse template.

For the Jazz's 2025–26 "City" uniform, they revisited the popular "Red Rocks" design from 2017 to 2022, but recolored to a black and gray gradient with sky blue accents.

=== Throwback uniforms ===
The Jazz have worn the original J-note uniforms on three separate occasions. During the 2003–04 season, the Jazz commemorated the team's 25th season in Utah by donning replicas of the 1986–96 white uniforms. Then in the 2009–10 season, the Jazz wore the 1979–1984 green uniforms (albeit with white trim and letters) to pay tribute to the 30th anniversary of the aforementioned move to Utah.

For the 2018–19 season, the Jazz wore a modernized version of their 1984–1996 purple uniforms to mark the team's 40th season in Utah.

For the 2019–20 season, the Jazz wore a modernized version of their 1996–2004 purple uniforms. The team wore these uniform designs during its two trips to the NBA Finals in 1997 and 1998. The Jazz brought such uniforms back for the 2022–23 season but treated as a "City" uniform, due to the fact that it bore the current Nike swoosh logo whereas other "Classic" edition uniforms bore the classic wordmark-and-swoosh logo beginning in 2021.

For the 2023–24 season, the Jazz announced that they would wear the original 1974–75 purple uniforms as part of the franchise's 50th anniversary and as part of its #PurpleIsBack marketing campaign.

== Personnel ==
=== Current roster ===
Utah Jazz roster
Players

Pos.	No.	Player	Height	Weight	DOB	From
G	15	Trey Alexander (TW)	6 ft 5 in (1.96 m)	185 lb (84 kg)	2003-05-02	Creighton
F	19	Ace Bailey	6 ft 9 in (2.06 m)	200 lb (91 kg)	2006-08-13	Rutgers
C	44	Mo Bamba	7 ft 0 in (2.13 m)	231 lb (105 kg)	1998-05-12	Texas
C	13	Tony Bradley	6 ft 10 in (2.08 m)	248 lb (112 kg)	1998-01-08	North Carolina
G	0	Kobe Bufkin (TW)	6 ft 4 in (1.93 m)	195 lb (88 kg)	2003-09-21	Michigan
G	8	Isaiah Collier	6 ft 4 in (1.93 m)	210 lb (95 kg)	2004-10-08	USC
C	2	Kyle Filipowski	6 ft 11 in (2.11 m)	250 lb (113 kg)	2003-10-07	Duke
G	3	Keyonte George	6 ft 5 in (1.96 m)	185 lb (84 kg)	2003-11-08	Baylor
G	5	Josh Green	6 ft 6 in (1.98 m)	200 lb (91 kg)	2000-11-16	Arizona
F/C	11	Jaxson Hayes	7 ft 0 in (2.13 m)	220 lb (100 kg)	2000-05-23	Texas
F	00	Harrison Ingram (TW)	6 ft 5 in (1.96 m)	230 lb (104 kg)	2002-11-27	North Carolina
F/C	20	Jaren Jackson Jr. (injured)	6 ft 10 in (2.08 m)	242 lb (110 kg)	1999-09-15	Michigan State
F/C	23	Lauri Markkanen	7 ft 1 in (2.16 m)	240 lb (109 kg)	1997-05-22	Arizona
G/F	10	Sviatoslav Mykhailiuk	6 ft 6 in (1.98 m)	205 lb (93 kg)	1997-06-10	Kansas
C	30	Jusuf Nurkić (injured)	7 ft 0 in (2.13 m)	290 lb (132 kg)	1994-08-23	Bosnia and Herzegovina
G	21	Josh Okogie	6 ft 4 in (1.93 m)	213 lb (97 kg)	1998-09-01	Georgia Tech
G	22	Darryn Peterson	6 ft 6 in (1.98 m)	205 lb (93 kg)	2007-01-17	Kansas
F	28	Brice Sensabaugh	6 ft 6 in (1.98 m)	225 lb (102 kg)	2003-10-30	Ohio State

Coaches
**Head coach**
- Will Hardy
**Assistant(s)**
- Chad Forcier
- Christopher Jones
- Scott Morrison
- Sean Sheldon
- Jason Terry
- Andrew Warren
- Mike Williams
- Steve Wojciechowski

**Legend**
- **(DP)** Unsigned draft pick
- **(FA)** Free agent
- **(S)** Suspended
- **(GL)** On assignment to G League affiliate
- **(TW)** Two-way affiliate player
- Injured

Roster
Updated: October 24, 2026

=== Retained draft rights ===
Occasionally, the Jazz hold the draft rights to unsigned draft picks who have been playing outside the NBA. A drafted player, either an international draftee or a college draftee, who is not signed by the team that drafted him, is allowed to sign with any non-NBA teams. In this case, the team retains the player's draft rights in the NBA until one year after the player's contract with the non-NBA team ends. This list includes draft rights that were acquired from trades with other teams.

Draft	Round	Pick	Player	Pos.	Nationality	Current team	Note(s)	Ref
2022	2	36	Gabriele Procida	G/F	Italy	Real Madrid (Spain)	Acquired from the Portland Trail Blazers (via Detroit)	
2021	2	57	Balša Koprivica	C	Serbia	Bahçeşehir Koleji (Turkey)	Acquired from the Detroit Pistons (via LA Clippers)	

=== Retired numbers ===
Utah Jazz retired numbers
No.	Player	Position	Tenure	Date
1	Frank Layden	Head coach	1981–1988	December 9, 1988
4	Adrian Dantley	F	1979–1986	April 11, 2007
7	Pete Maravich	G	1974–1980	December 14, 1985
9	Larry H. Miller	Owner	1985–2009	April 14, 2010
12	John Stockton	G	1984–2003	November 22, 2004
14	Jeff Hornacek	G	1994–2000	November 19, 2002
32	Karl Malone	F	1985–2003	March 23, 2006
35	Darrell Griffith	G	1980–1991	December 4, 1993
53	Mark Eaton	C	1982–1993	March 1, 1996
1223	Jerry Sloan	Head coach	1988–2011	January 31, 2014
	"Hot" Rod Hundley	Broadcaster	1974–2009	January 29, 2010

- The NBA retired Bill Russell's No. 6 for all its member teams on August 11, 2022.

=== Basketball Hall of Famers ===
Utah Jazz Hall of Famers
Players
No.	Name	Position	Tenure	Inducted
**7**; **44**	Pete Maravich	G	1974–1980	1987
**8**	Walt Bellamy ^{1}	C	1974	1993
**25**	Gail Goodrich	G	1976–1979	1996
**4**	Adrian Dantley	F/G	1979–1986	2008
**12**	John Stockton ^{2}	G	1984–2003	2009
**32**	Karl Malone ^{3}	F	1985–2003	2010
**22**	Bernard King	F	1979–1980	2013
**24**	Spencer Haywood	F/C	1979	2015
Coaches
Name		Position	Tenure	Inducted
**1223**	Jerry Sloan	Assistant coach Head coach	1985–1988; 1988–2011	2009

Notes:

- ^{1} In total, Bellamy was inducted into the Hall of Fame twice – as player and as a member of the 1960 Olympic team.
- ^{2} In total, Stockton was inducted into the Hall of Fame twice – as player and as a member of the 1992 Olympic team.
- ^{3} In total, Malone was inducted into the Hall of Fame twice – as player and as a member of the 1992 Olympic team.

=== FIBA Hall of Fame ===
Utah Jazz Hall of Famers
Players
No.	Name	Position	Tenure	Inducted
**44**	José Ortiz	F/C	1988–1990	2019

=== Franchise leaders ===
Bold denotes still active with team. Italics denotes still active but not with team.

Points scored (regular season) (as of the end of the 2025–26 season)

1. Karl Malone (36,374)
2. John Stockton (19,711)
3. Adrian Dantley (13,635)
4. Darrell Griffith (12,391)
5. Thurl Bailey (9,897)
6. Andrei Kirilenko (8,411)
7. Pete Maravich (8,324)
8. Donovan Mitchell (8,234)
9. Gordon Hayward (8,077)
10. Rudy Gobert (7,592)
11. Deron Williams (7,576)
12. Derrick Favors (7,336)
13. Mehmet Okur (7,255)
14. Rickey Green (6,917)
15. Jeff Hornacek (6,848)
16. Carlos Boozer (6,821)
17. Paul Millsap (6,713)
18. Jordan Clarkson (5,985)
19. Bryon Russell (5,752)
20. Matt Harpring (5,640)
21. Mark Eaton (5,216)
22. Jeff Malone (5,158)
23. Joe Ingles (5,094)
24. **Lauri Markkanen** (4,984)
25. Al Jefferson (4,089)
26. Rich Kelley (4,044)
27. Aaron James (3,829)
28. Bojan Bogdanović (3,748)
29. Alec Burks (3,671)
30. Bob Hansen (3,550)
31. Jeff Wilkins (3,445)
32. Greg Ostertag (3,425)
33. **Keyonte George** (3,374)
34. Collin Sexton (3,302)
35. C.J. Miles (3,264)
36. Jim McElroy (3,188)
37. David Benoit (3,035)
38. Rodney Hood (2,985)
39. Mike Conley (2,949)
40. Truck Robinson (2,901)
41. Ben Poquette (2,873)
42. Ronnie Brewer (2,786)
43. Howard Eisley (2,779)
44. Nate Williams (2,726)
45. John Drew (2,670)
46. Gail Goodrich (2,582)
47. Blue Edwards (2,560)
48. Trey Burke (2,547)
49. Enes Kanter Freedom (2,475)
50. Raja Bell (2,445)

Other statistics (regular season) (as of the end of the 2025–26 season)

Most minutes played
Player	Minutes
Karl Malone	53,479
John Stockton	47,764
Mark Eaton	25,169
Darrell Griffith	21,403
Andrei Kirilenko	20,989
Thurl Bailey	20,523
Rudy Gobert	18,301
Adrian Dantley	17,899
Rickey Green	17,329
Bryon Russell	16,443

Most rebounds
Player	Rebounds
Karl Malone	14,601
Rudy Gobert	7,119
Mark Eaton	6,939
Derrick Favors	4,626
John Stockton	4,051
Greg Ostertag	3,978
Rich Kelley	3,972
Thurl Bailey	3,881
Andrei Kirilenko	3,836
Paul Millsap	3,792

Most assists
Player	Assists
John Stockton	15,806
Karl Malone	5,085
Rickey Green	4,159
Deron Williams	4,003
Joe Ingles	2,213
Andrei Kirilenko	1,919
Jeff Hornacek	1,895
Pete Maravich	1,844
Gordon Hayward	1,762
Adrian Dantley	1,702

Most steals
Player	Steals
John Stockton	3,265
Karl Malone	2,035
Rickey Green	1,100
Andrei Kirilenko	960
Darrell Griffith	931
Bryon Russell	728
Jeff Hornacek	618
Paul Millsap	604
Joe Ingles	544
Gordon Hayward	527

Most blocks
Player	Blocks
Mark Eaton	3,064
Andrei Kirilenko	1,380
Rudy Gobert	1,357
Greg Ostertag	1,253
Karl Malone	1,125
Thurl Bailey	879
Derrick Favors	840
Paul Millsap	520
Ben Poquette	517
Rich Kelley	498

Most three-pointers made
Player	3-pointers made
Joe Ingles	1,071
Donovan Mitchell	958
John Stockton	845
Jordan Clarkson	821
Gordon Hayward	689
**Lauri Markkanen**	628
Bojan Bogdanović	550
Byron Russell	540
Darrell Griffith	530
Mehmet Okur	517

=== Individual awards ===
NBA MVP

- Karl Malone – 1997, 1999

NBA Rookie of the Year

- Darrell Griffith – 1981

NBA Defensive Player of the Year

- Mark Eaton – 1985, 1989
- Rudy Gobert – 2018, 2019, 2021

NBA Sixth Man of the Year

- Jordan Clarkson – 2021

NBA Most Improved Player

- Lauri Markkanen – 2023

NBA Coach of the Year

- Frank Layden – 1984

NBA Executive of the Year

- Frank Layden – 1984

J. Walter Kennedy Citizenship Award

- Frank Layden - 1984
- Thurl Bailey - 1989

All-NBA First Team

- Pete Maravich – 1976, 1977
- Karl Malone – 1989–1999
- John Stockton – 1994, 1995

All-NBA Second Team

- Pete Maravich – 1978
- Adrian Dantley – 1981, 1984
- Karl Malone – 1988, 2000
- John Stockton – 1988–1990, 1992, 1993, 1996
- Deron Williams – 2008, 2010
- Rudy Gobert – 2017

All-NBA Third Team

- John Stockton – 1991, 1997, 1999
- Karl Malone – 2001
- Carlos Boozer – 2008
- Rudy Gobert – 2019–2021

NBA All-Defensive First Team

- E. C. Coleman – 1977
- Mark Eaton – 1985, 1986, 1989
- Karl Malone – 1997–1999
- Andrei Kirilenko – 2006
- Rudy Gobert – 2017–2022

NBA All-Defensive Second Team

- Mark Eaton – 1987, 1988
- Karl Malone – 1988
- John Stockton – 1989, 1991, 1992, 1995, 1997
- Andrei Kirilenko – 2004, 2005

NBA All-Rookie First Team

- Darrell Griffith – 1981
- Thurl Bailey – 1984
- Karl Malone – 1986
- Andrei Kirilenko – 2002
- Deron Williams – 2006
- Trey Burke – 2014
- Donovan Mitchell – 2018
- Walker Kessler – 2023

NBA All-Rookie Second Team

- Blue Edwards – 1990
- Paul Millsap – 2007
- Derrick Favors – 2011
- Keyonte George – 2024
- Ace Bailey – 2026

=== NBA All-Star Weekend ===
NBA All-Star Selections

- Pete Maravich – 1977–1979
- Truck Robinson – 1978
- Adrian Dantley – 1980–1982, 1984–1986
- Rickey Green – 1984
- Karl Malone – 1988–1998, 2000–2002
- John Stockton – 1989–1997, 2000
- Mark Eaton – 1989
- Andrei Kirilenko – 2004
- Carlos Boozer – 2007, 2008
- Mehmet Okur – 2007
- Deron Williams – 2010, 2011
- Gordon Hayward – 2017
- Rudy Gobert – 2020–2022
- Donovan Mitchell – 2020–2022
- Mike Conley Jr. – 2021
- Lauri Markkanen – 2023

NBA All-Star Game MVP

- Karl Malone – 1989, 1993
- John Stockton – 1993

NBA All-Star Game head coaches

- Frank Layden – 1984
- Quin Snyder – 2021

== Broadcasters ==
Until the 1993 season, local station KSTU was the team's television broadcast partner. After it was purchased by Fox, KSTU's programming schedule no longer had space to carry Jazz games, leaving the team without a broadcast partner. In 1993, Larry H. Miller purchased local TV station KXIV and renamed it to KJZZ, in an effort to create a sports-oriented station to showcase his teams. The new KJZZ station started carrying Jazz games with the 1993–1994 season.

KJZZ continued to carry the team's games until 2009, when the Jazz signed a new exclusive 12-year agreement with then FSN Utah, (now part of AT&T SportsNet Rocky Mountain) on October 20, 2009. A one-year extension was signed during the 2020 offseason, and the team continued to air games on AT&T SportsNet into the 2022–23 season.

In February 2023, Warner Bros. Discovery, owners of AT&T SportsNet Rocky Mountain, announced that they would wind down operations of AT&T SportsNet. The Jazz, who had already been exploring alternate broadcast solutions in 2022, would announce a return to KJZZ-TV for the 2023–24 season. In most of Idaho, Montana and portions of Washington and Oregon, the Jazz continue to air on Root Sports Northwest, which was formerly owned by Warner Bros. Discovery. In southeastern Idaho and western Wyoming, the Jazz are available through FuboTV. The Jazz also announced a streaming service with Kiswe, Jazz+, which offers options for annual and monthly subscriptions, as well as passes for individual games. In 2024, with the co-owned Utah Hockey Club (since named the Utah Mammoth) debuting under similar broadcasting arrangements, the service became part of a streaming hub known as SEG+. As Root Sports shut down at the end of 2025, Jazz+ coverage extended into territories formerly served by the channel for the 2025–26 season.

The Jazz's flagship radio stations are KZNS (1280) "The Zone" and KZNS-FM Fox Sports Radio 97.5.

The team's current TV and radio announcers are:

- Craig Bolerjack (TV play-by-play)
- Holly Rowe (TV color commentary)
- Thurl Bailey (TV color commentary)
- Alema Harrington (TV host, pre-game and post-game)
- Michael Smith (TV broadcast analyst)
- David Locke (radio play-by-play)
- Ron Boone (radio broadcast analyst)
- Dan Roberts (public address announcer, home games)
- Nelson Moran (Spanish Radio: play-by-play/color commentary)
- Isidro Lopez (Spanish Radio: play-by-play)
- Nicole Hernandez (Spanish Radio: color commentary/sideline reporter)

Retired announcers:

- Rod Hundley (TV and Radio play-by-play) (1974–2009)

== Head coaches ==
Years	Coach	Regular season	Postseason
1974	Scotty Robertson	1–14	
1974	Elgin Baylor	0–1	
1974–1976	Butch van Breda Kolff	74–100	
1976–1979	Elgin Baylor	86–134	
1979–1981	Tom Nissalke	60–124	
1981–1988	Frank Layden	277–294	18–23
1988–2011	Jerry Sloan	1127–682	96–100
2011–2014	Tyrone Corbin	112–146	0–4
2014–2022	Quin Snyder	372–264	21–30
2022–present	Will Hardy	107–221	0–0
Total		2216–1980	135–157
