= Priority Sports and Entertainment =

Sports management firm

Priority Sports & Entertainment is a full-service sports management firm, representing NFL and NBA athletes and coaches, based in Chicago, Illinois, and Sherman Oaks, California.

Priority Sports is one of the largest independently owned sports agencies in the US. It was founded in 1985 by Mark Bartelstein, a former investment banker at Morgan Stanley.

In 2013, Priority Sports & Entertainment was named on Forbes' list of the 10 World's Most Valuable Sports Agencies and the 8 Most Valuable NFL Agencies. In 2014, Priority was recognized as #7 among the World's Most Valuable Sports Agencies by Forbes, with $560 million in contract value under management. In 2015, Forbes ranked Priority #20 on the list, with $947.52 million in contract value under management and $33.2 million in commissions.

Priority Sports & Entertainment, fueled by its key contributor client Gordon Hayward, led all agencies in the total dollars negotiated as of 2017. Priority led the pack with $354.6 million negotiated for nine players.

Priority Sports finished #2 among all agencies in the 2017 NFL "free agency" signing period, negotiating over $243 million in contracts (QB Kirk Cousins, WR Mike Evans, C Ryan Jensen, OG Zach Fulton, QB Josh McCown, OT Jack Mewhort, QB Jake Rudock, TE Josiah Price, FB Zach Line, LB Mike Mauti, and QB Drew Stanton), and finished #1 among all agencies worldwide for the highest percentage guarantees in their contracts.

Since founding Priority Sports, Bartelstein has been rated as one of the most influential sports agents by Street & Smith's Sports Business Journal. He first gained acclaim after negotiating the contract for NBA star John "Hot Rod" Williams, because it made him the highest paid player in the history of team sports at the time.

== Basketball division ==
=== Player agents ===
The company has represented more than 24 first round NBA draft picks. In the 2010 NBA draft, Priority Sports represented four athletes who were drafted in the first round, more than any other agency. In the 2015 NBA draft, Priority Sports represented four first-round picks. "Priority has represented 20 players, or 9.5 percent, of the first-round selections in the NBA draft over the past seven years. This year Priority represented No. 18 pick Sam Dekker, No. 22 pick Bobby Portis, No. 27 pick Larry Nance Jr. and No. 28 R.J. Hunter. Bartelstein and Priority agents Reggie Brown, Joel Cornette, Zach Kurtin, Kieran Piller and Andy Shiffman represent the players."

=== Athletes ===
Priority Sports represents the following NBA athletes:

- Bradley Beal (Washington Wizards) re-signed with the Wizards for five years and $128 million.
- David Lee (Golden State Warriors; retired) agreed in 2010 to a sign and trade that moved him from the New York Knicks to the Warriors with a contract worth $80 million over six years.
- Gordon Hayward (Boston Celtics) was the 9th overall pick in the 2010 NBA draft. He signed a $11,000,000 contract over four years with the Utah Jazz, and remained with the team until signing a four-year, $128 million deal with the Celtics in the 2017 offseason.

Other NBA athletes represented by Priority Sports include Kyle Lowry, Joe Ingles, Jabari Parker, Enes Kanter, DeMarre Carroll, Jared Dudley, Damion James, Brad Miller, Brian Grant, Bobby Simmons, Will Bynum, Mark Blount, Brian Cardinal, Michael Dickerson, Trenton Hassell, James Posey, Jannero Pargo, and Darius Songaila.

== Football division ==
=== Contract advisors ===
Priority Sports has worked with NFL athletes for over twenty years. In addition to Bartelstein, partner Rick Smith (President of Coaches, Front Office & Broadcasters), partner Mike McCartney, Kyle Dolan (Director of Football Operations), Dominique Price and partner Kenny Zuckerman (President/Athlete Representation) are agents at the company.

=== Athletes ===
Priority Sports represents the following NFL athletes:

- Kirk Cousins (Minnesota Vikings) signed the largest fully guaranteed contract in NFL history, worth $84 million for three years.
- Mike Evans (Tampa Bay Buccaneers) became the NFL's second highest-paid receiver, with a five-year, $82.5 million contract extension.
- Ryan Jensen (Tampa Bay Buccaneers) is a former Ravens center who became one of the highest-paid interior linemen in football. The Buccaneers signed him to a four-year, $42 million deal, with $22 million guaranteed.
- Josh McCown (New York Jets) signed a contract for one year and $10 million.
- Robert Gallery (Oakland Raiders) was the second pick in the 2004 NFL draft. He signed a seven-year contract worth $60 million and an $18 million signing bonus.
- Tyson Alualu (Jacksonville Jaguars) was the tenth pick in the 2010 NFL draft He signed a five-year contract worth nearly $28 million, including over $17 million guaranteed.
- Levi Jones (Cincinnati Bengals), a 2002 first-round pick, signed a six-year contract extension worth $40 million, including over $16 million guaranteed.
- Kurt Warner (Arizona Cardinals; retired) was the 1999 and 2001 NFL MVP, and Super Bowl XXXIV winner and MVP. He signed a two-year contract worth $24 million with $19 million guaranteed.
- A. J. Hawk (Green Bay Packers), the fifth pick in the 2006 NFL draft, signed a six-year contract worth $40 million with over $15 million guaranteed.
- Jake Delhomme (Cleveland Browns), a 2005 Pro Bowl quarterback, was released by the Carolina Panthers in 2010, then signed a two-year deal worth $12.5 million with the Browns during free agency. Because of contract language that was in his deal with Carolina, the Panthers still had to pay him $12,7 million in guaranteed money, bringing his 2010 salary to a total of $19,7 million.
- Haloti Ngata (Detroit Lions), the 12th pick in the 2006 NFL draft, signed a five-year contract worth $14 million with over $9 million guaranteed. His present contract is a four-year deal worth $48.5 million, which includes a $25 million signing bonus.
- Olin Kreutz (Chicago Bears), a perennial Pro Bowler, signed a three-year contract extension for $25 million with a $9 million signing bonus.
- Kevin Mawae (Tennessee Titans) currently serves as the President of the National Football League Players Association.

Other NFL athletes represented by Priority Sports include Arian Foster, Brooks Reed, Nate Kaeding, Koa Misi, Mike Pollak, Alterraun Verner, Sean Lee, and Levi Jones, Kyle Kosier, Dominic Raiola, Isaac Sopoaga, Madieu Williams, Kris Dielman, Tony Pashos, Alan Faneca, and Luis Castillo.
