= 2025 Dallas Cowboys season =

66th season in franchise history

- Owner: Jerry Jones
- General manager: Jerry Jones
- Head coach: Brian Schottenheimer
- Home stadium: AT&T Stadium

Results
- Record: 7–9–1
- Division place: 2nd NFC East
- Playoffs: Did not qualify
- All-Pros: K Brandon Aubrey (2nd team); WR George Pickens (2nd team); WR KaVontae Turpin (2nd team) (Note: Selected as a kick returner)
- Pro Bowlers: K Brandon Aubrey; WR CeeDee Lamb; WR George Pickens; QB Dak Prescott; G Tyler Smith; DT Quinnen Williams; TE Jake Ferguson; RS KaVontae Turpin

Uniform
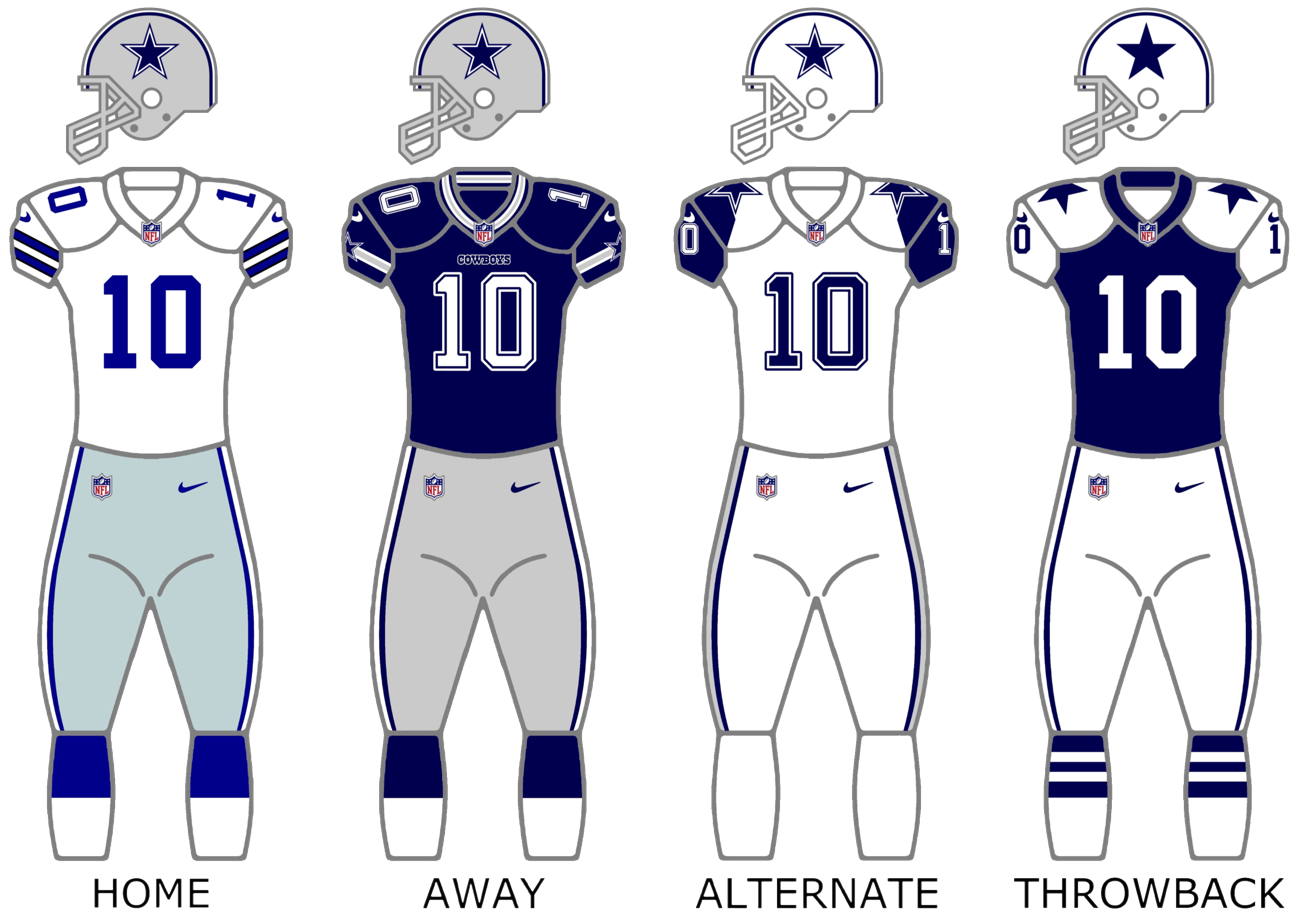

The 2025 season was the Dallas Cowboys' 66th in the National Football League (NFL), their 17th playing home games at AT&T Stadium, and their first under head coach Brian Schottenheimer.

This was the Cowboys' first season since 2013 without guard Zack Martin or defensive end DeMarcus Lawrence. Martin announced his retirement on February 20, and Lawrence signed with the Seattle Seahawks during free agency. It was also the team's first season since 2020 without defensive end Micah Parsons, as the Cowboys traded him to the Green Bay Packers in exchange for defensive tackle Kenny Clark and two first round draft picks amid a contract holdout going back to the previous season and heading into the subsequent offseason and preseason.

The Cowboys improved upon their 7–10 record from the previous season, but missed the playoffs for the second straight season, as they were eliminated from playoff contention after the Philadelphia Eagles defeated the Washington Commanders in Week 16 and clinched the NFC East and became the first repeat NFC East champion since 2004. Dallas also clinched their second consecutive losing season after their upset loss in Week 18 to the New York Giants for the first time since the infamous Dave Campo era from 2000 to 2002.

Despite having the second-best offense in the league, led by George Pickens, Dak Prescott, CeeDee Lamb, and Javonte Williams, as well as one of the best special teams units led by Brandon Aubrey, the defense was ranked as the league's worst in many statistical categories, most notably points allowed per game, as well as yards allowed per game. The points allowed per game surpassed the 2020 mark of 29.6, at 30.1, setting a new franchise record. The Cowboys also allowed 511 points altogether, which also surpassed the 2020 mark of 473. The Cowboys also recorded a league- and franchise-worst touchdowns allowed, at 60.

The Cowboys' Thanksgiving game against the Kansas City Chiefs became the most watched NFL regular season game on record, drawing 57.2 million viewers. The game was broadcast on CBS and streaming service Paramount+, and peaked with 61.4 million viewers by the game's conclusion.

== Offseason ==
=== Signings ===
Position	Player	Age	2024 team	Contract
RB	Miles Sanders	28	Carolina Panthers	1 year, $1.3 million
RB	Javonte Williams	25	Denver Broncos	1 year, $3 million
G	Robert Jones	26	Miami Dolphins	1 year, $3.75 million
T	Hakeem Adeniji	27	Cleveland Browns	1 year, $1.2 million
DE	Dante Fowler	31	Washington Commanders	1 year, $8 million
DE	Payton Turner	26	New Orleans Saints	1 year, $3 million
DT	Solomon Thomas	30	New York Jets	2 years, $6 million
LB	Jack Sanborn	25	Chicago Bears	1 year, $1.5 million

=== Re-signings ===
Position	Player	Age	Contract
WR	KaVontae Turpin	29	3 years, $18 million
C	Dakoda Shepley	31	2 years, $2.3 million
DT	Osa Odighizuwa	27	4 years, $80 million
CB	C. J. Goodwin	35	1 year, $1.2 million
SS	Markquese Bell	26	3 years, $9 million
P	Bryan Anger	37	2 years, $6.4 million
LS	Trent Sieg	30	3 years, $4.5 million

=== Trade acquisitions ===
Position	Player	Age	2024 team	Traded away
QB	Joe Milton	25	New England Patriots	2025 fifth-round selection
WR	George Pickens	24	Pittsburgh Steelers	2026 third-round selection and 2027 fifth-round selection
DT	Kenny Clark	29	Green Bay Packers	DE Micah Parsons
DT	Quinnen Williams	27	New York Jets	DT Mazi Smith, 2026 second-round selection, and 2027 first-round selection (Note: The Jets will receive the higher of the Cowboys' own 2027 1st or the Packers' 2027 1st that was previously traded to Dallas in the Micah Parsons trade)
LB	Kenneth Murray	27	Tennessee Titans	2025 sixth-round selection
LB	Logan Wilson	29	Cincinnati Bengals	2026 seventh-round selection

=== Departures ===
Position	Player	Age	2025 team
QB	Trey Lance	25	Los Angeles Chargers
QB	Cooper Rush	32	Baltimore Ravens
RB	Rico Dowdle	27	Carolina Panthers
WR	Brandin Cooks	32	Buffalo Bills
T	Chuma Edoga	28	Jacksonville Jaguars
G	Zack Martin	35	Retired
DE	Chauncey Golston	27	New York Giants
DE	DeMarcus Lawrence	33	Seattle Seahawks
DE	Carl Lawson	30	Baltimore Ravens
DE	Micah Parsons	26	Green Bay Packers
DE	Carlos Watkins	32	Tennessee Titans
DT	Linval Joseph	37	Unsigned
DT	Mazi Smith	24	New York Jets
LB	Eric Kendricks	33	San Francisco 49ers
CB	Jourdan Lewis	30	Jacksonville Jaguars
CB	Israel Mukuamu	26	Carolina Panthers
CB	Amani Oruwariye	29	Baltimore Ravens

== Draft ==
2025 Dallas Cowboys draft selections
Round	Selection	Player	Position	College	Notes
1	12	Tyler Booker	OG	Alabama	
2	44	Donovan Ezeiruaku	DE	Boston College	
3	76	Shavon Revel	CB	East Carolina	
4	114	Traded to the Carolina Panthers (Note: The Cowboys traded a fourth-round selection to the Carolina Panthers in exchange for a seventh-round selection and WR Jonathan Mingo.)			
5	149	Jaydon Blue	RB	Texas	
5	152	Shemar James	LB	Florida	From Arizona
5	170	Traded to the Buffalo Bills (Note: The Cowboys traded a fifth-round selection (170th overall) and a 2026 seventh-round selection to the Buffalo Bills in exchange for a sixth-round selection (204th overall) and CB Kaiir Elam.)			Compensatory pick
5	171	Traded to the New England Patriots (Note: The Cowboys traded a fifth-round selection (171th overall) to the New England Patriots in exchange for a seventh-round selection (217th overall) and QB Joe Milton.)			Compensatory pick
5	174	Traded to the Arizona Cardinals			Compensatory pick
6	188	Traded to the Tennessee Titans (Note: The Cowboys traded a sixth-round selection to the Tennessee Titans in exchange for LB Kenneth Murray.)			
6	204	Ajani Cornelius	OT	Oregon	From Bills via Cardinals
6	211	Traded to the Arizona Cardinals			Compensatory pick
7	217	Jay Toia	DT	UCLA	From Patriots
7	228	Traded to the Detroit Lions (Note: The Cowboys traded a seventh-round selection and a 2024 first-round selection (24th overall) to the Detroit Lions in exchange for first- and third-round selections (29th and 73rd overall).)			
7	239	Phil Mafah	RB	Clemson	From Tennessee
7	247	Tommy Akingbesote	DT	Maryland	From Panthers

Draft trades

2025 Dallas Cowboys undrafted free agents
Position	Player	College
OLB	Justin Barron	Syracuse
S	Zion Childress	Kentucky
S	Alijah Clark	Syracuse
TE	Rivaldo Fairweather	Auburn
CB	Bruce Harmon	Stephen F. Austin
WR	Traeshon Holden	Oregon
WR	Josh Kelly	Texas Tech
TE	Tyler Neville	Virginia
S	Mike Smith	Eastern Kentucky

== Staff ==
2025 Dallas Cowboys staff
Front office: Owner/president/general manager – Jerry Jones; COO/executive vice president/director of player personnel – Stephen Jones; Executive vice president/chief brand officer – Charlotte Jones Anderson; Executive vice president/chief of sales – Jerry Jones Jr.; Vice president of player personnel – Will McClay; Senior director of football operations/football administration – Todd Williams; Director of football administration and technology – Jason McKay; Director of college scouting – Mitch LaPoint; Assistant director of college scouting - Chris Vaughn; Director of pro scouting – Alex Loomis; Director of strategic football operations - John Park; Director of salary cap/player contracts – Adam Prasifka; Director of player development – Bryan Wansley; Head coaches: Head coach – Brian Schottenheimer; Offensive coaches: Offensive coordinator – Klayton Adams; Quarterbacks – Steve Shimko; Running backs – Derrick Foster; Wide receivers – Junior Adams; Assistant wide receivers – Tiquan Underwood; Tight ends – Lunda Wells; Offensive line – Conor Riley; Assistant offensive line – Ramon Chinyoung; Pass game specialist – Ken Dorsey; Quarterback fellowship – Dele Harding; Game management coordinator – Ryan Feder	Defensive coaches: Defensive coordinator – Matt Eberflus; Defensive line – Aaron Whitecotton; Assistant defensive line – Bryan Bing; Linebackers – Dave Borgonzi; Defensive passing game coordinator/safeties – Andre Curtis; Cornerbacks/secondary – David Overstreet II; Secondary/nickels – Darian Thompson; Defensive assistant/quality control – JJ Clark; Defensive assistant/quality control – Tanzel Smart; Special teams coaches: Special teams coordinator – Nick Sorensen; Assistant special teams – Carlos Polk; Chief of staff – Tyler Boyles; Strength and conditioning: Strength and conditioning – Harold Nash; Assistant strength and conditioning – Cedric Smith; Assistant strength and conditioning – Kendall Smith; Assistant strength and conditioning/sport science – Braylon Tatum

== Final roster ==
2025 Dallas Cowboys roster
Quarterbacks (QB): 10 Joe Milton; 4 Dak Prescott; Running backs (RB): 23 Jaydon Blue; 40 Hunter Luepke; 37 Phil Mafah; Wide receivers (WR): 19 Ryan Flournoy; 88 CeeDee Lamb; 81 Jonathan Mingo; 3 George Pickens; 1 Jalen Tolbert; 9 KaVontae Turpin; Tight ends (TE): 87 Jake Ferguson; 86 Luke Schoonmaker; 89 Brevyn Spann-Ford	Offensive linemen (OL): 75 Hakeem Adeniji G/T; 56 Cooper Beebe C; 52 Tyler Booker G; 67 Brock Hoffman C/G; 73 Tyler Smith G/T; 78 Terence Steele T; 71 Nate Thomas T; Defensive linemen (DL): 95 Kenny Clark DT; 42 Jadeveon Clowney DE; 41 Donovan Ezeiruaku DE; 13 Dante Fowler DE; 53 James Houston DE; 97 Osa Odighizuwa DT; 90 Solomon Thomas DT; 93 Jay Toia DT; 92 Quinnen Williams DT; 54 Sam Williams DE; 99 Perrion Winfrey DT	Linebackers (LB): 45 Justin Barron OLB; 50 Shemar James OLB; 35 Marist Liufau OLB; 59 Kenneth Murray MLB; 0 DeMarvion Overshown OLB; 55 Logan Wilson OLB; Defensive backs (DB): 36 Corey Ballentine CB; 14 Markquese Bell SS; 25 Trikweze Bridges CB; 31 Josh Butler CB; 21 Caelen Carson CB; 38 Alijah Clark FS; 29 C. J. Goodwin CB; 28 Malik Hooker FS; 34 Shavon Revel CB; 27 Reddy Steward CB; 6 Donovan Wilson SS; Special teams (ST): 5 Bryan Anger P; 17 Brandon Aubrey K; 44 Trent Sieg LS	Practice squad: 30 Israel Abanikanda RB; 51 Earnest Brown IV DE; 11 Parris Campbell WR; 48 Zion Childress CB; 85 Princeton Fant TE; 15 Will Grier QB; 80 Traeshon Holden WR; 79 Marcellus Johnson T; 91 Isaiah Land DE; 61 Nick Leverett G; 16 Jalen Moreno-Cropper WR; 96 Adedayo Odeleye DE (IPP); 32 Julius Wood SS; Reserve: 66 T. J. Bass G (IR); 26 DaRon Bland CB (IR); 69 Ajani Cornelius T (IR); 43 Malik Davis RB (IR); 60 Tyler Guyton T (IR); 65 Robert Jones G (IR); 76 Trevor Keegan G (IR); 57 Jack Sanborn MLB (IR); 24 Miles Sanders RB (IR); 2 Juanyeh Thomas FS (NF-Ill.); 98 Payton Turner DE (IR/DFR); 33 Javonte Williams RB (IR); Rookies in italics 52 active, 12 reserve, 13 practice squad

== Preseason ==
Week	Date	Opponent	Result	Record	Venue	Recap
1	August 9	at Los Angeles Rams	L 21–31	0–1	SoFi Stadium	Recap
2	August 16	Baltimore Ravens	L 13–31	0–2	AT&T Stadium	Recap
3	August 22	Atlanta Falcons	W 31–13	1–2	AT&T Stadium	Recap

== Regular season ==
=== Schedule ===
On May 12, the NFL announced that the Cowboys would go on the road to face the defending Super Bowl LIX champion and division rival Philadelphia Eagles in the NFL Kickoff Game on September 4.

Week	Date	Opponent	Result	Record	Venue	Recap
1	September 4	at **Philadelphia Eagles**	**L** 20–24	0–1	Lincoln Financial Field	Recap
2	September 14	**New York Giants**	**W** 40–37 (OT)	1–1	AT&T Stadium	Recap
3	September 21	at Chicago Bears	**L** 14–31	1–2	Soldier Field	Recap
4	September 28	Green Bay Packers	**T** 40–40 (OT)	1–2–1	AT&T Stadium	Recap
5	October 5	at New York Jets	**W** 37–22	2–2–1	MetLife Stadium	Recap
6	October 12	at Carolina Panthers	**L** 27–30	2–3–1	Bank of America Stadium	Recap
7	October 19	**Washington Commanders**	**W** 44–22	3–3–1	AT&T Stadium	Recap
8	October 26	at Denver Broncos	**L** 24–44	3–4–1	Empower Field at Mile High	Recap
9	November 3	Arizona Cardinals	**L** 17–27	3–5–1	AT&T Stadium	Recap
10	Bye					
11	November 17	at Las Vegas Raiders	**W** 33–16	4–5–1	Allegiant Stadium	Recap
12	November 23	**Philadelphia Eagles**	**W** 24–21	5–5–1	AT&T Stadium	Recap
13	November 27	Kansas City Chiefs	**W** 31–28	6–5–1	AT&T Stadium	Recap
14	December 4	at Detroit Lions	**L** 30–44	6–6–1	Ford Field	Recap
15	December 14	Minnesota Vikings	**L** 26–34	6–7–1	AT&T Stadium	Recap
16	December 21	Los Angeles Chargers	**L** 17–34	6–8–1	AT&T Stadium	Recap
17	December 25	at **Washington Commanders**	**W** 30–23	7–8–1	Northwest Stadium	Recap
18	January 4	at **New York Giants**	**L** 17–34	7–9–1	MetLife Stadium	Recap

Note: Intra-division opponents are in bold text.

=== Game summaries ===
==== Week 1: at Philadelphia Eagles ====
NFL Kickoff Game

Week 1: Dallas Cowboys at Philadelphia Eagles – Game summary

Quarter	1	2	3	4	Total
Cowboys	7	13	0	0	**20**
**Eagles**	7	14	3	0	**24**

at Lincoln Financial Field, Philadelphia, Pennsylvania

- Date: September 4
- Game time: 8:20 p.m. EDT/7:20 p.m. CDT
- Game weather: Rain, 75 °F (24 °C)
- Game attendance: 69,879
- Referee: Shawn Smith
- TV announcers (NBC): Mike Tirico, Cris Collinsworth and Melissa Stark
- Recap, Game Book

Game information

**First quarter**

- DAL – Javonte Williams 1-yard run (Brandon Aubrey kick), 11:49. Cowboys 7–0. **Drive: 6 plays, 53 yards, 3:11.**
- PHI – Jalen Hurts 4-yard run (Jake Elliott kick), 5:55. Tied 7–7. **Drive: 10 plays, 70 yards, 5:54.**

**Second quarter**

- DAL – Javonte Williams 1-yard run (Brandon Aubrey kick), 14:56. Cowboys 14–7. **Drive: 9 plays, 88 yards, 5:59.**
- PHI – Jalen Hurts 8-yard run (Jake Elliott kick), 6:46. Tied 14–14. **Drive: 12 plays, 65 yards, 8:10.**
- DAL – Brandon Aubrey 41-yard field goal, 2:34. Cowboys 17–14. **Drive: 10 plays, 46 yards, 4:12.**
- PHI – Saquon Barkley 10-yard run (Jake Elliott kick), 0:51. Eagles 21–17. **Drive: 8 plays, 81 yards, 1:43.**
- DAL – Brandon Aubrey 53-yard field goal, 0:00. Eagles 21–20. **Drive: 7 plays, 53 yards, 0:51.**

**Third quarter**

- PHI – Jake Elliott 58-yard field goal, 8:30. Eagles 24–20. **Drive: 10 plays, 32 yards, 6:30.**

**Fourth quarter**

- No scoring plays

**Top passers**

- DAL – Dak Prescott – 21/34, 188 yards
- PHI – Jalen Hurts – 19/23, 152 yards

**Top rushers**

- DAL – Javonte Williams – 15 rushes, 54 yards, 2 TD
- PHI – Jalen Hurts – 14 rushes, 62 yards, 2 TD

**Top receivers**

- DAL – CeeDee Lamb – 7 receptions, 110 yards
- PHI – Jahan Dotson – 3 receptions, 59 yards

The Cowboys traveled to Philadelphia to face the Eagles in the NFL Kickoff Game. Immediately following the opening kickoff, Eagles defensive tackle Jalen Carter was ejected for spitting on Dak Prescott. The Cowboys took advantage of the subsequent 15-yard penalty and powered their way to a 7–0 opening drive lead on a Javonte Williams touchdown run. The Eagles quickly answered with a touchdown of their own as quarterback Jalen Hurts scored on a 4-yard run to tie the game at 7. Williams would score his second touchdown on the Cowboys' second drive to put Dallas back on top 14–7, but the defense again failed to slow the Eagles down, and Hurts scored another touchdown to tie the game at 14. The Cowboys' third drive stalled at the Eagles' 23, and they settled for a Brandon Aubrey field goal to reclaim a three-point lead. Less than two minutes later, however, Saquon Barkley scored Philadelphia's third touchdown on the ensuing Eagles drive to put the Eagles ahead 21–17. Dallas would pull within one point before halftime on a 53-yard field goal by Aubrey, but would never get any closer. In the second half, the Cowboys defense held Philadelphia to a field goal on the opening drive, then the offense drove into the red zone, powered by a 49-yard run by former Eagle Miles Sanders. However, Sanders would fumble at the 10 yard line, giving the Eagles the ball back. The game was suspended immediately afterwards due to a thunderstorm in the area. After a weather delay of over an hour, the game resumed. From there, the teams' defenses stymied each other. Cowboys wide receiver CeeDee Lamb would have three crucial dropped passes after the weather delay, the last occurring on a fourth down with less than two minutes in the fourth quarter, effectively sealing the game for Philadelphia.

With the 24–20 road loss, the Cowboys began the season 0–1, and suffered their sixth road loss in their past seven visits to Philadelphia.

==== Week 2: vs. New York Giants ====
Week 2: New York Giants at Dallas Cowboys – Game summary

Quarter	1	2	3	4	OT	Total
Giants	6	7	3	21	0	**37**
**Cowboys**	0	10	7	20	3	**40**

at AT&T Stadium, Arlington, Texas

- Date: September 14
- Game time: 12:00 p.m. CDT
- Game weather: None (retractable roof closed)
- Game attendance: 92,781
- Referee: Bill Vinovich
- TV announcers (Fox): Joe Davis, Greg Olsen and Pam Oliver
- Recap, Game Book

Game information

**First quarter**

- NYG – Graham Gano 38-yard field goal, 6:11. Giants 3–0. **Drive: 16 plays, 60 yards, 8:49.**
- NYG – Graham Gano 33-yard field goal, 1:05. Giants 6–0. **Drive: 8 plays, 55 yards, 3:42.**

**Second quarter**

- DAL – Brandon Aubrey 51-yard field goal, 8:25. Giants 6–3. **Drive: 8 plays, 42 yards, 3:49.**
- NYG – Malik Nabers 29-yard pass from Russell Wilson (Graham Gano kick), 5:37. Giants 13–3. **Drive: 5 plays, 70 yards, 2:48.**
- DAL – KaVontae Turpin 10-yard pass from Dak Prescott (Brandon Aubrey kick), 2:11. Giants 13–10. **Drive: 8 plays, 64 yards, 3:26.**

**Third quarter**

- DAL – Javonte Williams 30-yard run (Brandon Aubrey kick), 7:20. Cowboys 17–13. **Drive: 6 plays, 90 yards, 3:00.**
- NYG – Graham Gano 33-yard field goal, 5:38. Cowboys 17–16. **Drive: 5 plays, 52 yards, 1:42.**

**Fourth quarter**

- DAL – Brandon Aubrey 44-yard field goal, 14:13. Cowboys 20–16. **Drive: 11 plays, 56 yards, 6:25.**
- NYG – Cameron Skattebo 1-yard run (Graham Gano kick), 12:07. Giants 23–20. **Drive: 4 plays, 60 yards, 2:06.**
- DAL – Miles Sanders 4-yard run (Brandon Aubrey kick), 6:14. Cowboys 27–23. **Drive: 10 plays, 85 yards, 5:53.**
- NYG – Wan'Dale Robinson 32-yard pass from Russell Wilson (Graham Gano kick), 2:44. Giants 30–27. **Drive: 7 plays, 63 yards, 3:30.**
- DAL – George Pickens 6-yard pass from Dak Prescott (Brandon Aubrey kick), 0:52. Cowboys 34–30. **Drive: 11 plays, 71 yards, 1:52.**
- NYG – Malik Nabers 48-yard pass from Russell Wilson (Graham Gano kick), 0:25. Giants 37–34. **Drive: 3 plays, 63 yards, 0:27.**
- DAL – Brandon Aubrey 64-yard field goal, 0:00. Tied 37–37. **Drive: 4 plays, 21 yards, 0:25.**

**Overtime**

- DAL – Brandon Aubrey 46-yard field goal, 0:00. Cowboys 40–37. **Drive: 4 plays, 42 yards, 2:00.**

**Top passers**

- NYG – Russell Wilson – 30/41, 450 yards, 3 TD, INT
- DAL – Dak Prescott – 38/52, 361 yards, 2 TD, INT

**Top rushers**

- NYG – Cameron Skattebo – 11 rushes, 45 yards, TD
- DAL – Javonte Williams – 18 rushes, 97 yards, TD

**Top receivers**

- NYG – Malik Nabers – 9 receptions, 167 yards, 2 TD
- DAL – CeeDee Lamb – 9 receptions, 112 yards

In a back-and-forth game that featured six lead changes, tying an NFL record, Giants quarterback Russell Wilson threw a 48-yard touchdown pass to wide receiver Malik Nabers to give the Giants the lead with 25 seconds remaining. Dak Prescott led the Cowboys to the New York 46-yard line, and kicker Brandon Aubrey made a 64-yard field goal to send the game into overtime. In overtime, after both teams combined for five consecutive go-ahead touchdowns, Prescott led the Cowboys down the field again, and Aubrey kicked the game-winning 46-yard field goal as time expired, securing a 40–37 victory for Dallas. With the win, the Cowboys extended their winning streak against the Giants to nine games, the longest active streak among division opponents in the NFL.

==== Week 3: at Chicago Bears ====
Week 3: Dallas Cowboys at Chicago Bears – Game summary

Quarter	1	2	3	4	Total
Cowboys	3	11	0	0	**14**
**Bears**	14	10	7	0	**31**

at Soldier Field, Chicago, Illinois

- Date: September 21
- Game time: 3:25 p.m. CDT
- Game weather: Mostly sunny, 82 °F (28 °C)
- Game attendance: 58,389
- Referee: Clay Martin
- TV announcers (Fox): Kevin Burkhardt, Tom Brady, Erin Andrews and Tom Rinaldi
- Recap, Game Book

Game information

**First quarter**

- CHI – Rome Odunze 35-yard pass from Caleb Williams (Cairo Santos kick), 10:35. Bears 7–0. **Drive: 5 plays, 76 yards, 1:56.**
- DAL – Brandon Aubrey 53-yard field goal, 4:21. Bears 7–3. **Drive: 11 plays, 46 yards, 6:14.**
- CHI – Luther Burden III 65-yard pass from Caleb Williams (Cairo Santos kick), 4:10. Bears 14–3. **Drive: 1 play, 65 yards, 0:11.**

**Second quarter**

- DAL – Brandon Aubrey 33-yard field goal, 13:49. Bears 14–6. **Drive: 10 plays, 50 yards, 5:21.**
- DAL – George Pickens 2-yard pass from Dak Prescott (Dak Prescott–Jalen Tolbert pass), 7:57. Tied 14–14. **Drive: 7 plays, 57 yards, 4:12.**
- CHI – Cairo Santos 30-yard field goal, 4:15. Bears 17–14. **Drive: 8 plays, 54 yards, 3:42.**
- CHI – Cole Kmet 10-yard pass from Caleb Williams (Cairo Santos kick), 0:25. Bears 24–14. **Drive: 7 plays, 71 yards, 2:00.**

**Third quarter**

- CHI – D. J. Moore 4-yard pass from Caleb Williams (Cairo Santos kick), 0:09. Bears 31–14. **Drive: 19 plays, 76 yards, 9:54.**

**Fourth quarter**

- No scoring plays

**Top passers**

- DAL – Dak Prescott – 31/40, 251 yards, TD, 2 INT
- CHI – Caleb Williams – 19/28, 298 yards, 4 TD

**Top rushers**

- DAL – Javonte Williams – 10 rushes, 76 yards
- CHI – D'Andre Swift – 13 rushes, 33 yards

**Top receivers**

- DAL – Jake Ferguson – 13 receptions, 82 yards
- CHI – Luther Burden III – 3 receptions, 101 yards, TD

With the loss, the Cowboys fell to 1–2 and 0–1 against the NFC North.

==== Week 4: vs. Green Bay Packers ====
Week 4: Green Bay Packers at Dallas Cowboys – Game summary

Quarter	1	2	3	4	OT	Total
Packers	7	6	7	17	3	**40**
Cowboys	0	16	7	14	3	**40**

at AT&T Stadium, Arlington, Texas

- Date: September 28
- Game time: 7:20 p.m. CDT
- Game weather: Partly cloudy, 81 °F (27 °C) (retractable roof open)
- Game attendance: 93,353
- Referee: Ron Torbert
- TV announcers (NBC): Mike Tirico, Cris Collinsworth and Melissa Stark
- Recap, Game Book

Game information

**First quarter**

- GB – Romeo Doubs 2-yard pass from Jordan Love (Brandon McManus kick), 10:02. Packers 7–0. **Drive: 8 plays, 69 yards, 4:58.**

**Second quarter**

- GB – Romeo Doubs 1-yard pass from Jordan Love (kick blocked), 10:37. Packers 13–0. **Drive: 9 plays, 68 yards, 5:41.**
- DAL – Blocked kick returned by Markquese Bell, 10:37. Packers 13–2.
- DAL – Dak Prescott 2-yard run (Brandon Aubrey kick), 0:41. Packers 13–9. **Drive: 11 plays, 95 yards, 5:09.**
- DAL – George Pickens 15-yard pass from Dak Prescott (Brandon Aubrey kick), 0:09. Cowboys 16–13. **Drive: 1 play, 15 yards, 0:04.**

**Third quarter**

- GB – Josh Jacobs 1-yard run (Brandon McManus kick), 7:08. Packers 20–16. **Drive: 9 plays, 76 yards, 5:25.**
- DAL – Jake Ferguson 8-yard pass from Dak Prescott (Brandon Aubrey kick), 0:34. Cowboys 23–20. **Drive: 12 plays, 80 yards, 6:34.**

**Fourth quarter**

- GB – Josh Jacobs 18-yard run (Brandon McManus kick), 11:39. Packers 27–23. **Drive: 8 plays, 70 yards, 3:55.**
- DAL – Javonte Williams 1-yard run (Brandon Aubrey kick), 4:50. Cowboys 30–27. **Drive: 14 plays, 77 yards, 6:49.**
- GB – Romeo Doubs 15-yard pass from Jordan Love (Brandon McManus kick), 1:45. Packers 34–30. **Drive: 10 plays, 80 yards, 3:05.**
- DAL – George Pickens 28-yard pass from Dak Prescott (Brandon Aubrey kick), 0:43. Cowboys 37–34. **Drive: 4 plays, 54 yards, 1:02.**
- GB – Brandon McManus 53-yard field goal, 0:00. Tied 37–37. **Drive: 7 plays, 39 yards, 0:43.**

**Overtime**

- DAL – Brandon Aubrey 22-yard field goal, 4:40. Cowboys 40–37. **Drive: 10 plays, 76 yards, 5:20.**
- GB – Brandon McManus 34-yard field goal, 0:00. Tied 40–40. **Drive: 13 plays, 64 yards, 4:40.**

**Top passers**

- GB – Jordan Love – 31/43, 337 yards, 3 TD
- DAL – Dak Prescott – 31/40, 319 yards, 3 TD

**Top rushers**

- GB – Josh Jacobs – 22 rushes, 86 yards, 2 TD
- DAL – Javonte Williams – 20 rushes, 85 yards, TD

**Top receivers**

- GB – Josh Jacobs – 4 receptions, 71 yards
- DAL – George Pickens – 8 receptions, 134 yards, 2 TD

This was the Cowboys' first tie game since a 24–24 result against the San Francisco 49ers on in the 1969 season, and consequently their first tie game to be played with overtime rules. With the tie, the Cowboys improved to 1–2–1 while snapping their 5 game losing streak to Green Bay. Despite this, the Cowboys are now 0–5–1 against the Packers at AT&T Stadium since it opened in 2009.

==== Week 5: at New York Jets ====
Week 5: Dallas Cowboys at New York Jets – Game summary

Quarter	1	2	3	4	Total
**Cowboys**	3	20	7	7	**37**
Jets	3	0	3	16	**22**

at MetLife Stadium, East Rutherford, New Jersey

- Date: October 5
- Game time: 1:00 p.m. EDT/12:00 p.m. CDT
- Game weather: Sunny, 82 °F (28 °C)
- Game attendance: 81,738
- Referee: Alex Moore
- TV announcers (Fox): Jason Benetti, Greg Olsen and Pam Oliver
- Recap, Game Book

Game information

**First quarter**

- NYJ – Nick Folk 25-yard field goal, 7:43. Jets 3–0. **Drive: 13 plays, 66 yards, 7:17.**
- DAL – Brandon Aubrey 35-yard field goal, 4:57. Tied 3–3. **Drive: 7 plays, 49 yards, 2:46.**

**Second quarter**

- DAL – Jake Ferguson 26-yard pass from Dak Prescott (Brandon Aubrey kick), 11:40. Cowboys 10–3. **Drive: 13 plays, 90 yards, 6:10.**
- DAL – Javonte Williams 5-yard run (Brandon Aubrey kick), 0:57. Cowboys 17–3. **Drive: 7 plays, 91 yards, 1:21.**
- DAL – Jake Ferguson 1-yard pass from Dak Prescott (kick failed), 0:15. Cowboys 23–3. **Drive: 2 plays, 67 yards, 0:14.**

**Third quarter**

- DAL – George Pickens 43-yard pass from Dak Prescott (Brandon Aubrey kick), 4:33. Cowboys 30–3. **Drive: 2 plays, 53 yards, 0:43.**
- NYJ – Nick Folk 48-yard field goal, 0:57. Cowboys 30–6. **Drive: 6 plays, 44 yards, 3:36.**

**Fourth quarter**

- NYJ – Andrew Beck 1-yard pass from Justin Fields (Justin Fields–Mason Taylor pass), 7:56. Cowboys 30–14. **Drive: 10 plays, 78 yards, 4:13.**
- DAL – Javonte Williams 4-yard pass from Dak Prescott (Brandon Aubrey kick), 4:31. Cowboys 37–14. **Drive: 8 plays, 46 yards, 3:25.**
- NYJ – Garrett Wilson 9-yard pass from Justin Fields (Justin Fields–Josh Reynolds pass), 1:42. Cowboys 37–22. **Drive: 11 plays, 70 yards, 2:49.**

**Top passers**

- DAL – Dak Prescott – 18/29, 237 yards, 4 TD
- NYJ – Justin Fields – 32/46, 283 yards, 2 TD

**Top rushers**

- DAL – Javonte Williams – 16 rushes, 135 yards, TD
- NYJ – Breece Hall – 14 rushes, 113 yards

**Top receivers**

- DAL – Ryan Flournoy – 6 receptions, 114 yards
- NYJ – Garrett Wilson – 6 receptions, 71 yards, TD

With the win, the Cowboys improved to 2–2–1, and their record improved to .500. Dallas defeated New York on the road for the first time since 2003.

==== Week 6: at Carolina Panthers ====
Week 6: Dallas Cowboys at Carolina Panthers – Game summary

Quarter	1	2	3	4	Total
Cowboys	3	14	7	3	**27**
**Panthers**	3	10	7	10	**30**

at Bank of America Stadium, Charlotte, North Carolina

- Date: October 12
- Game time: 1:00 p.m. EDT/12:00 p.m. CDT
- Game weather: Cloudy, 68 °F (20 °C)
- Game attendance: 71,619
- Referee: John Hussey
- TV announcers (Fox): Adam Amin, Greg Olsen and Pam Oliver
- Recap, Game Book

Game information

**First quarter**

- CAR – Ryan Fitzgerald 31-yard field goal, 9:08. Panthers 3–0. **Drive: 8 plays, 63 yards, 4:09.**
- DAL – Brandon Aubrey 23-yard field goal, 4:48. Tied 3–3. **Drive: 10 plays, 68 yards, 4:20.**

**Second quarter**

- DAL – Hunter Luepke 3-yard pass from Dak Prescott (Brandon Aubrey kick), 14:56. Cowboys 10–3. **Drive: 4 plays, 12 yards, 2:09.**
- CAR – Tetairoa McMillan 19-yard pass from Bryce Young (Ryan Fitzgerald kick), 11:29. Tied 10–10. **Drive: 6 plays, 65 yards, 3:27.**
- DAL – Jake Ferguson 19-yard pass from Dak Prescott (Brandon Aubrey kick), 3:39. Cowboys 17–10. **Drive: 13 plays, 77 yards, 7:50.**
- CAR – Ryan Fitzgerald 55-yard field goal, 0:20. Cowboys 17–13. **Drive: 9 plays, 29 yards, 3:19.**

**Third quarter**

- CAR – Rico Dowdle 36-yard pass from Bryce Young (Ryan Fitzgerald kick), 13:19. Panthers 20–17. **Drive: 4 plays, 80 yards, 1:41.**
- DAL – George Pickens 34-yard pass from Dak Prescott (Brandon Aubrey kick), 2:38. Cowboys 24–20. **Drive: 6 plays, 73 yards, 2:50.**

**Fourth quarter**

- CAR – Tetairoa McMillan 2-yard pass from Bryce Young (Ryan Fitzgerald kick), 12:20. Panthers 27–24. **Drive: 10 plays, 65 yards, 5:18.**
- DAL – Brandon Aubrey 28-yard field goal, 9:20. Tied 27–27. **Drive: 10 plays, 61 yards, 3:00.**
- CAR – Ryan Fitzgerald 33-yard field goal, 0:00. Panthers 30–27. **Drive: 15 plays, 71 yards, 6:07.**

**Top passers**

- DAL – Dak Prescott – 25/34, 261 yards, 3 TD
- CAR – Bryce Young – 17/25, 199 yards, 3 TD, INT

**Top rushers**

- DAL – Javonte Williams – 13 rushes, 29 yards
- CAR – Rico Dowdle – 30 rushes, 183 yards

**Top receivers**

- DAL – George Pickens – 9 receptions, 168 yards, TD
- CAR – Rico Dowdle – 4 receptions, 56 yards, TD

The Cowboys were severely outgained on the ground, 216–31, with Panthers running back Rico Dowdle, who played for Dallas from 2020 to 2024, rushing for 183 yards and totaling 239 yards from scrimmage. With their first loss to Carolina since 2018, the Cowboys fell to 2–3–1.

==== Week 7: vs. Washington Commanders ====
Week 7: Washington Commanders at Dallas Cowboys – Game summary

Quarter	1	2	3	4	Total
Commanders	8	7	7	0	**22**
**Cowboys**	17	10	14	3	**44**

at AT&T Stadium, Arlington, Texas

- Date: October 19
- Game time: 3:25 p.m. CDT
- Game weather: None (retractable roof closed)
- Game attendance: 93,051
- Referee: Alex Kemp
- TV announcers (Fox): Kevin Burkhardt, Tom Brady, Erin Andrews and Tom Rinaldi
- Recap, Game Book

Game information

**First quarter**

- DAL – Javonte Williams 2-yard run (Brandon Aubrey kick), 13:05. Cowboys 7–0. **Drive: 5 plays, 66 yards, 1:55.**
- WAS – Daron Payne safety, 11:23. Cowboys 7–2.
- WAS – Zach Ertz 5-yard pass from Jayden Daniels (run failed), 7:38. Commanders 8–7. **Drive: 7 plays, 65 yards, 3:45.**
- DAL – Brandon Aubrey 47-yard field goal, 6:14. Cowboys 10–8. **Drive: 5 plays, 31 yards, 1:24.**
- DAL – CeeDee Lamb 74-yard pass from Dak Prescott (Brandon Aubrey kick), 4:27. Cowboys 17–8. **Drive: 1 play, 74 yards, 0:11.**

**Second quarter**

- DAL – Brandon Aubrey 61-yard field goal, 7:22. Cowboys 20–8. **Drive: 8 plays, 11 yards, 3:34.**
- WAS – Jayden Daniels 1-yard run (Matt Gay kick), 0:45. Cowboys 20–15. **Drive: 7 plays, 68 yards, 1:11.**
- DAL – Jake Ferguson 2-yard pass from Dak Prescott (Brandon Aubrey kick), 0:10. Cowboys 27–15. **Drive: 4 plays, 72 yards, 0:35.**

**Third quarter**

- DAL – Jake Ferguson 5-yard pass from Dak Prescott (Brandon Aubrey kick), 7:44. Cowboys 34–15. **Drive: 9 plays, 55 yards, 4:03.**
- DAL – DaRon Bland 68-yard interception return (Brandon Aubrey kick), 5:31. Cowboys 41–15.
- WAS – Chris Rodriguez Jr. 3-yard run (Matt Gay kick), 2:35. Cowboys 41–22. **Drive: 7 plays, 53 yards, 2:56.**

**Fourth quarter**

- DAL – Brandon Aubrey 29-yard field goal, 12:45. Cowboys 44–22. **Drive: 9 plays, 56 yards, 4:50.**

**Top passers**

- WAS – Jayden Daniels – 12/22, 156 yards, TD
- DAL – Dak Prescott – 21/30, 264 yards, 3 TD

**Top rushers**

- WAS – Jayden Daniels – 8 rushes, 35 yards, TD
- DAL – Javonte Williams – 19 rushes, 116 yards, TD

**Top receivers**

- WAS – Jaylin Lane – 3 receptions, 60 yards
- DAL – CeeDee Lamb – 5 receptions, 110 yards, TD

In a rematch of last year's Week 18 game, the Cowboys destroyed the Commanders in a 44–22 blowout win, which resulted in them improving to 3–3–1.

==== Week 8: at Denver Broncos ====
Week 8: Dallas Cowboys at Denver Broncos – Game summary

Quarter	1	2	3	4	Total
Cowboys	3	7	7	7	**24**
**Broncos**	14	13	3	14	**44**

at Empower Field at Mile High, Denver, Colorado

- Date: October 26
- Game time: 3:25 p.m. CDT/2:25 p.m. MST
- Game weather: Cloudy, 67 °F (19 °C)
- Game attendance: 75,877
- Referee: Carl Cheffers
- TV announcers (CBS): Jim Nantz, Tony Romo and Tracy Wolfson
- Recap, Game Book

Game information

**First quarter**

- DAL – Brandon Aubrey 24-yard field goal, 10:34. Cowboys 3–0. **Drive: 8 plays, 46 yards, 3:01.**
- DEN – RJ Harvey 40-yard run (Wil Lutz kick), 8:13. Broncos 7–3. **Drive: 5 plays, 74 yards, 2:21.**
- DEN – Troy Franklin 25-yard pass from Bo Nix (Wil Lutz kick), 3:04. Broncos 14–3. **Drive: 4 plays, 62 yards, 2:39.**

**Second quarter**

- DAL – Javonte Williams 1-yard run (Brandon Aubrey kick), 7:29. Broncos 14–10. **Drive: 11 plays, 59 yards, 6:15.**
- DEN – RJ Harvey 1-yard run (pass failed), 3:47. Broncos 20–10. **Drive: 6 plays, 65 yards, 3:42.**
- DEN – Pat Bryant 24-yard pass from Bo Nix (Wil Lutz kick), 0:39. Broncos 27–10. **Drive: 7 plays, 72 yards, 1:35.**

**Third quarter**

- DAL – Javonte Williams 1-yard run (Brandon Aubrey kick), 8:10. Broncos 27–17. **Drive: 13 plays, 65 yards, 6:50.**
- DEN – Wil Lutz 42-yard field goal, 6:02. Broncos 30–17. **Drive: 5 plays, 22 yards, 2:08.**

**Fourth quarter**

- DEN – Troy Franklin 7-yard pass from Bo Nix (Wil Lutz kick), 12:48. Broncos 37–17. **Drive: 12 plays, 84 yards, 5:30.**
- DEN – RJ Harvey 5-yard pass from Bo Nix (Wil Lutz kick), 7:14. Broncos 44–17. **Drive: 8 plays, 55 yards, 3:01.**
- DAL – Jalen Tolbert 35-yard pass from Joe Milton (Brandon Aubrey kick), 4:44. Broncos 44–24. **Drive: 6 plays, 65 yards, 2:30.**

**Top passers**

- DAL – Dak Prescott – 19/31, 188 yards, 2 INT
- DEN – Bo Nix – 19/29, 247 yards, 4 TD, INT

**Top rushers**

- DAL – Javonte Williams – 13 rushes, 41 yards, 2 TD
- DEN – J. K. Dobbins – 15 rushes, 111 yards

**Top receivers**

- DAL – George Pickens – 7 receptions, 78 yards
- DEN – Troy Franklin – 6 receptions, 89 yards, 2 TD

In a reversal of the previous week in the win over the Commanders, Cowboys went to Denver to take on the Broncos, a team whom Dallas has not beaten since 1995. Following a field goal on their opening drive following an interception thrown by Broncos quarterback Bo Nix, the Cowboys were dominated by the Broncos after that, which the Broncos scored 40+ points for the first time this season. With the loss, the Cowboys fell to 3–4–1, and fell to 0–8 in their last eight games against the Broncos, including the last three games by a combined score of 116–57.

==== Week 9: vs. Arizona Cardinals ====
Week 9: Arizona Cardinals at Dallas Cowboys – Game summary

Quarter	1	2	3	4	Total
**Cardinals**	3	14	10	0	**27**
Cowboys	0	7	3	7	**17**

at AT&T Stadium, Arlington, Texas

- Date: November 3
- Game time: 7:15 p.m. CST
- Game weather: None (retractable roof closed)
- Game attendance: 92,211
- Referee: Adrian Hill
- TV announcers (ESPN/ABC): Joe Buck, Troy Aikman, Lisa Salters and Laura Rutledge
- Recap, Game Book

Game information

**First quarter**

- ARI – Chad Ryland 48-yard field goal, 3:38. Cardinals 3–0. **Drive: 15 plays, 60 yards, 6:54.**

**Second quarter**

- ARI – Marvin Harrison Jr. 4-yard pass from Jacoby Brissett (Chad Ryland kick), 12:17. Cardinals 10–0. **Drive: 8 plays, 47 yards, 4:45.**
- DAL – Marshawn Kneeland blocked punt recovery (Brandon Aubrey kick), 3:58. Cardinals 10–7.
- ARI – Jacoby Brissett 1-yard run (Chad Ryland kick), 0:49. Cardinals 17–7. **Drive: 11 plays, 74 yards, 3:09.**

**Third quarter**

- ARI – Trey McBride 12-yard pass from Jacoby Brissett (Chad Ryland kick), 12:48. Cardinals 24–7. **Drive: 3 plays, 74 yards, 2:12.**
- DAL – Brandon Aubrey 26-yard field goal, 7:15. Cardinals 24–10. **Drive: 12 plays, 65 yards, 5:33.**
- ARI – Chad Ryland 34-yard field goal, 2:31. Cardinals 27–10. **Drive: 9 plays, 45 yards, 4:44.**

**Fourth quarter**

- DAL – Ryan Flournoy 5-yard pass from Dak Prescott (Brandon Aubrey kick), 10:51. Cardinals 27–17. **Drive: 7 plays, 78 yards, 2:01.**

**Top passers**

- ARI – Jacoby Brissett – 21/31, 261 yards, 2 TD
- DAL – Dak Prescott – 24/39, 250 yards, TD, INT

**Top rushers**

- ARI – Emari Demercado – 14 rushes, 79 yards
- DAL – Javonte Williams – 15 rushes, 83 yards

**Top receivers**

- ARI – Marvin Harrison Jr. – 7 receptions, 96 yards, TD
- DAL – CeeDee Lamb – 7 receptions, 85 yards

The Cowboys had an extremely disappointing game against the Jacoby Brissett-led Arizona Cardinals, as they were defeated 27–17. With their fourth consecutive loss to the Cardinals since 2020, and their seventh out of eight since 2008, the Cowboys dropped to 3–5–1 entering their bye week.

Sam Williams propelled the Cowboys to block a punt, which was recovered by Marshawn Kneeland who would score the team’s first points of the game.

Tragedy later struck when defensive end Marshawn Kneeland died on November 6 as the result of an apparent suicide.

The next week (Week 10) was the Cowboys’ bye week.

==== Week 11: at Las Vegas Raiders ====
Week 11: Dallas Cowboys at Las Vegas Raiders – Game summary

Quarter	1	2	3	4	Total
**Cowboys**	3	21	7	2	**33**
Raiders	6	3	0	7	**16**

at Allegiant Stadium, Paradise, Nevada

- Date: November 17
- Game time: 7:15 p.m. CST/5:15 p.m. PST
- Game weather: None (indoor stadium)
- Game attendance: 62,625
- Referee: Brad Allen
- TV announcers (ESPN/ABC): Joe Buck, Troy Aikman, Lisa Salters and Laura Rutledge
- Recap, Game Book

Game information

**First quarter**

- LV – Daniel Carlson 35-yard field goal, 7:55. Raiders 3–0. **Drive: 4 plays, -2 yards, 1:16.**
- DAL – Brandon Aubrey 50-yard field goal, 5:36. Tied 3–3. **Drive: 7 plays, 37 yards, 2:19.**
- LV – Daniel Carlson 45-yard field goal, 2:02. Raiders 6–3. **Drive: 7 plays, 46 yards, 3:34.**

**Second quarter**

- DAL – CeeDee Lamb 18-yard pass from Dak Prescott (Brandon Aubrey kick), 14:51. Cowboys 10–6. **Drive: 6 plays, 68 yards, 2:11.**
- DAL – Jake Ferguson 5-yard pass from Dak Prescott (Brandon Aubrey kick), 5:16. Cowboys 17–6. **Drive: 12 plays, 79 yards, 6:33.**
- DAL – George Pickens 37-yard pass from Dak Prescott (Brandon Aubrey kick), 1:11. Cowboys 24–6. **Drive: 4 plays, 69 yards, 1:14.**
- LV – Daniel Carlson 38-yard field goal, 0:00. Cowboys 24–9. **Drive: 9 plays, 50 yards, 1:10.**

**Third quarter**

- DAL – Ryan Flournoy 2-yard pass from Dak Prescott (Brandon Aubrey kick), 6:19. Cowboys 31–9. **Drive: 12 plays, 80 yards, 7:07.**

**Fourth quarter**

- LV – Tre Tucker 6-yard pass from Geno Smith (Daniel Carlson kick), 13:22. Cowboys 31–16. **Drive: 14 plays, 62 yards, 7:57.**
- DAL – Ashton Jeanty loss of 1-yard for a safety, 11:39. Cowboys 33–16.

**Top passers**

- DAL – Dak Prescott – 25/33, 268 yards, 4 TD
- LV – Geno Smith – 27/42, 238 yards, TD, INT

**Top rushers**

- DAL – Javonte Williams – 22 rushes, 93 yards
- LV – Geno Smith – 4 rushes, 14 yards

**Top receivers**

- DAL – George Pickens – 9 receptions, 144 yards, TD
- LV – Brock Bowers – 7 receptions, 72 yards

Both teams paid tribute to Marshawn Kneeland, who died by apparent suicide on November 6. Head coach Brian Schottenheimer and players wore t-shirts in his honor, and everyone bowed their heads during a moment of silence prior to kickoff.

Despite the Raiders recovering a Prescott fumble on the second drive, the Cowboys would control much of the game. They defeated the Raiders and improved to 4–5–1.

==== Week 12: vs. Philadelphia Eagles ====
Week 12: Philadelphia Eagles at Dallas Cowboys – Game summary

Quarter	1	2	3	4	Total
Eagles	14	7	0	0	**21**
**Cowboys**	0	7	7	10	**24**

at AT&T Stadium, Arlington, Texas

- Date: November 23
- Game time: 3:25 p.m. CST
- Game weather: None (retractable roof closed)
- Game attendance: 93,068
- Referee: Bill Vinovich
- TV announcers (Fox): Kevin Burkhardt, Tom Brady, Erin Andrews and Tom Rinaldi
- Recap, Game Book

Game information

**First quarter**

- PHI – A. J. Brown 16-yard pass from Jalen Hurts (Jake Elliott kick), 8:41. Eagles 7–0. **Drive: 7 plays, 50 yards, 3:10.**
- PHI – Jalen Hurts 7-yard run (Jake Elliott kick), 0:57. Eagles 14–0. **Drive: 12 plays, 76 yards, 6:08.**

**Second quarter**

- PHI – Jalen Hurts 1-yard run (Jake Elliott kick), 11:32. Eagles 21–0. **Drive: 6 plays, 66 yards, 3:10.**
- DAL – George Pickens 1-yard pass from Dak Prescott (Brandon Aubrey kick), 0:21. Eagles 21–7. **Drive: 6 plays, 72 yards, 2:31.**

**Third quarter**

- DAL – Brevyn Spann-Ford 4-yard pass from Dak Prescott (Brandon Aubrey kick), 2:02. Eagles 21–14. **Drive: 7 plays, 89 yards, 2:16.**

**Fourth quarter**

- DAL – Dak Prescott 8-yard run (Brandon Aubrey kick), 11:40. Tied 21–21. **Drive: 3 plays, 54 yards, 1:29.**
- DAL – Brandon Aubrey 42-yard field goal, 0:00. Cowboys 24–21. **Drive: 9 plays, 49 yards, 1:35.**

**Top passers**

- PHI – Jalen Hurts – 27/39, 289 yards, TD
- DAL – Dak Prescott – 23/36, 354 yards, 2 TD, INT

**Top rushers**

- PHI – Jalen Hurts – 7 rushes, 33 yards, 2 TD
- DAL – Javonte Williams – 20 rushes, 87 yards

**Top receivers**

- PHI – A. J. Brown – 8 receptions, 110 yards, TD
- DAL – George Pickens – 9 receptions, 146 yards, TD

After trailing 21–0 by the second quarter, the Cowboys marched back with 24 unanswered points to defeat the Eagles.

The 21-point comeback tied a Cowboys franchise record for their largest comeback, matching a 21-point rally against the St. Louis Rams in the 2014 season. Dak Prescott threw for 354 yards to become the Cowboys’ all-time leading passer, surpassing Tony Romo’s career total of 34,183 yards. Prescott also broke a tie with Romo by recording his 25th game-winning drive when tied or trailing in the fourth quarter or overtime.

==== Week 13: vs. Kansas City Chiefs ====
Thanksgiving Day games

Week 13: Kansas City Chiefs at Dallas Cowboys – Game summary

Quarter	1	2	3	4	Total
Chiefs	14	0	0	14	**28**
**Cowboys**	7	10	3	11	**31**

at AT&T Stadium, Arlington, Texas

- Date: November 27
- Game time: 3:30 p.m. CST
- Game weather: None (retractable roof closed)
- Game attendance: 93,739
- Referee: John Hussey
- TV announcers (CBS): Jim Nantz, Tony Romo and Tracy Wolfson
- Recap, Game Book

Game information

**First quarter**

- KC – Rashee Rice 27-yard pass from Patrick Mahomes (Harrison Butker kick), 13:04. Chiefs 7–0. **Drive: 2 plays, 37 yards, 0:36.**
- DAL – CeeDee Lamb 15-yard pass from Dak Prescott (Brandon Aubrey kick), 6:50. Tied 7–7. **Drive: 12 plays, 75 yards, 6:14.**
- KC – Travis Kelce 2-yard pass from Patrick Mahomes (Harrison Butker kick), 0:01. Chiefs 14–7. **Drive: 12 plays, 72 yards, 6:49.**

**Second quarter**

- DAL – Brandon Aubrey 49-yard field goal, 10:22. Chiefs 14–10. **Drive: 10 plays, 53 yards, 4:39.**
- DAL – Malik Davis 43-yard run (Brandon Aubrey kick), 3:10. Cowboys 17–14. **Drive: 8 plays, 85 yards, 2:53.**

**Third quarter**

- DAL – Brandon Aubrey 36-yard field goal, 4:09. Cowboys 20–14. **Drive: 7 plays, 78 yards, 2:56.**

**Fourth quarter**

- KC – Rashee Rice 3-yard pass from Patrick Mahomes (Harrison Butker kick), 14:51. Chiefs 21–20. **Drive: 11 plays, 80 yards, 4:18.**
- DAL – Javonte Williams 3-yard pass from Dak Prescott (Dak Prescott–George Pickens pass), 11:15. Cowboys 28–21. **Drive: 8 plays, 68 yards, 3:36.**
- DAL – Brandon Aubrey 26-yard field goal, 5:16. Cowboys 31–21. **Drive: 8 plays, 82 yards, 4:10.**
- KC – Hollywood Brown 10-yard pass from Patrick Mahomes (Harrison Butker kick), 3:27. Cowboys 31–28. **Drive: 7 plays, 67 yards, 1:49.**

**Top passers**

- KC – Patrick Mahomes – 23/34, 261 yards, 4 TD
- DAL – Dak Prescott – 27/39, 320 yards, 2 TD, INT

**Top rushers**

- KC – Kareem Hunt – 14 rushes, 58 yards
- DAL – Javonte Williams – 17 rushes, 59 yards

**Top receivers**

- KC – Rashee Rice – 8 receptions, 92 yards, 2 TD
- DAL – CeeDee Lamb – 7 receptions, 112 yards, TD

The Cowboys defeated the Kansas City Chiefs in a close game by a score of 31–28. Dak Prescott led his team to a critical victory to improve the Cowboys record to 6–5–1, their first winning record since week 5 on the 2024 season. With this victory, the Cowboys became the first team in NFL history to beat the previous year's Super Bowl teams in the same week.

This game was watched by 57.2 million viewers, becoming the most watched NFL regular season game ever, shattering the previous record by more than 15 million.

==== Week 14: at Detroit Lions ====
Week 14: Dallas Cowboys at Detroit Lions – Game summary

Quarter	1	2	3	4	Total
Cowboys	3	6	10	11	**30**
**Lions**	10	10	7	17	**44**

at Ford Field, Detroit, Michigan

- Date: December 4
- Game time: 8:15 p.m. EST/7:15 p.m. CST
- Game weather: None (indoor stadium)
- Game attendance: 64,028
- Referee: Shawn Hochuli
- TV announcers (Prime Video): Al Michaels, Kirk Herbstreit and Kaylee Hartung
- Recap, Game Book

Game information

**First quarter**

- DET – Jake Bates 31-yard field goal, 10:46. Lions 3–0. **Drive: 8 plays, 44 yards, 4:14**
- DAL – Brandon Aubrey 57-yard field goal, 8:07. Tied 3–3. **Drive: 8 plays, 29 yards, 2:39**
- DET – Jahmyr Gibbs 1-yard run (Jake Bates Kick), 2:14. Lions 10–3. **Drive: 6 plays, 42 yards, 3:10**

**Second quarter**

- DAL – Brandon Aubrey 42-yard field goal, 9:23. Lions 10–6. **Drive: 16 plays, 46 yards, 7:51**
- DET – David Montgomery 35-yard run (Jake Bates Kick), 4:27. Lions 17–6. **Drive: 4 plays, 53 yards, 1:48**
- DAL – Brandon Aubrey 55-yard field goal, 0:50. Lions 17–9. **Drive: 9 plays, 43 yards, 3:37**
- DET – Jake Bates 47-yard field goal, 0:00. Lions 20–9. **Drive: 6 plays, 45 yards, 0:50**

**Third quarter**

- DET – Isaac TeSlaa 12-yard pass from Jared Goff (Jake Bates Kick), 14:14. Lions 27–9. **Drive: 2 plays, 14 yards, 0:34**
- DAL – Javonte Williams 1-yard run (Brandon Aubrey Kick), 10:41. Lions 27–16. **Drive: 9 plays, 65 yards, 3:33**
- DAL – Brandon Aubrey 63-yard field goal, 2:49. Lions 27–19. **Drive: 6 plays, 13 yards, 2:56**

**Fourth quarter**

- DET – Jake Bates 46-yard field goal, 11:50. Lions 30–19. **Drive: 10 plays, 40 yards, 5:59**
- DAL – Ryan Flournoy 42-yard pass from Dak Prescott (Dak Prescott–Jake Ferguson pass), 9:52. Lions 30–27. **Drive: 4 plays, 70 yards, 1:58**
- DET – Jahmyr Gibbs 10-yard run (Jake Bates Kick), 7:17. Lions 37–27. **Drive: 5 plays, 59 yards, 2:35**
- DAL – Brandon Aubrey 29-yard field goal, 3:42. Lions 37–30. **Drive: 13 plays, 56 yards, 3:35**
- DET – Jahmyr Gibbs 13-yard run (Jake Bates Kick), 2:29. Lions 44–30. **Drive: 3 plays, 51 yards, 1:23**

**Top passers**

- DAL – Dak Prescott – 31/47, 376 yards, TD, 2 INT
- DET – Jared Goff – 25/34, 309 yards, TD

**Top rushers**

- DAL – Javonte Williams – 17 rushes, 67 yards, TD
- DET – David Montgomery – 6 rushes, 60 yards, TD

**Top receivers**

- DAL – CeeDee Lamb – 6 receptions, 121 yards
- DET – Jameson Williams – 7 receptions, 96 yards

With their second straight loss to the Lions, the Cowboys fell to 6–6–1 and 0–2–1 against the NFC North. CeeDee Lamb was also concussed in the third quarter and out the rest of the game.

==== Week 15: vs. Minnesota Vikings ====
Week 15: Minnesota Vikings at Dallas Cowboys – Game summary

Quarter	1	2	3	4	Total
**Vikings**	7	10	7	10	**34**
Cowboys	7	10	6	3	**26**

at AT&T Stadium, Arlington, Texas

- Date: December 14
- Game time: 7:20 p.m. CST
- Game weather: None (retractable roof closed)
- Game attendance: 92,991
- Referee: Scott Novak
- TV announcers (NBC): Mike Tirico, Cris Collinsworth and Melissa Stark
- Recap, Game Book

Game information

**First quarter**

- DAL – Javonte Williams 1-yard run (Brandon Aubrey kick), 8:23. Cowboys 7–0. **Drive: 11 plays, 35 yards, 5:39.**
- MIN – Jalen Nailor 20-yard pass from J. J. McCarthy (Will Reichard kick), 2:35. Tied 7–7. **Drive: 2 plays, 53 yards, 0:33.**

**Second quarter**

- DAL – Malik Davis 1-yard run (Brandon Aubrey kick), 14:52. Cowboys 14–7. **Drive: 6 plays, 73 yards, 2:43.**
- MIN – J. J. McCarthy 1-yard run (Will Reichard kick), 9:28. Tied 14–14. **Drive: 10 plays, 75 yards, 5:24.**
- MIN – Will Reichard 29-yard field goal, 1:48. Vikings 17–14. **Drive: 8 plays, 48 yards, 4:03.**
- DAL – Brandon Aubrey 37-yard field goal, 0:03. Tied 17–17. **Drive: 10 plays, 41 yards, 1:45.**

**Third quarter**

- DAL – Brandon Aubrey 26-yard field goal, 11:14. Cowboys 20–17. **Drive: 7 plays, 50 yards, 3:46.**
- DAL – Brandon Aubrey 41-yard field goal, 4:50. Cowboys 23–17. **Drive: 9 plays, 67 yards, 5:20.**
- MIN – C. J. Ham 1-yard run (Will Reichard kick), 1:12. Vikings 24–23. **Drive: 8 plays, 73 yards, 3:38.**

**Fourth quarter**

- MIN – Jalen Nailor 4-yard pass from J. J. McCarthy (Will Reichard kick), 9:12. Vikings 31–23. **Drive: 5 plays, 51 yards, 3:08.**
- MIN – Will Reichard 53-yard field goal, 1:08. Vikings 34–23. **Drive: 10 plays, 26 yards, 4:22.**
- DAL – Brandon Aubrey 41-yard field goal, 0:19. Vikings 34–26. **Drive: 5 plays, 42 yards, 0:49.**

**Top passers**

- MIN – J. J. McCarthy – 15/24, 250 yards, 2 TD, INT
- DAL – Dak Prescott – 23/38, 294 yards

**Top rushers**

- MIN – Aaron Jones – 12 rushes, 34 yards
- DAL – Javonte Williams – 15 rushes, 91 yards, TD

**Top receivers**

- MIN – T. J. Hockenson – 4 receptions, 66 yards
- DAL – CeeDee Lamb – 6 receptions, 111 yards

With their first loss to Minnesota since 2019, the Cowboys fell to 6–7–1 and finished 0–3–1 against the NFC North, marking the first time they failed to defeat a single NFC North opponent since 2001 when it was called the NFC Central division. Dallas also failed to reach the 10-win mark for the second year in a row, their first time posting consecutive seasons with 9 or fewer wins since following up the aforementioned 2019 season's 8–8 record with a 6–10 record in 2020.

==== Week 16: vs. Los Angeles Chargers ====
Week 16: Los Angeles Chargers at Dallas Cowboys – Game summary

Quarter	1	2	3	4	Total
**Chargers**	7	14	3	10	**34**
Cowboys	7	10	0	0	**17**

at AT&T Stadium, Arlington, Texas

- Date: December 21
- Game time: 12:00 p.m. CST
- Game weather: None (retractable roof closed)
- Game attendance: 92,740
- Referee: Alan Eck
- TV announcers (Fox): Adam Amin, Drew Brees and Kristina Pink
- Recap, Game Book

Game information

**First quarter**

- DAL – Ryan Flournoy 5-yard pass from Dak Prescott (Brandon Aubrey kick), 10:20. Cowboys 7–0. **Drive: 10 plays, 79 yards, 4:40.**
- LAC – Quentin Johnston 23-yard pass from Justin Herbert (Cameron Dicker kick), 6:43. Tied 7–7. **Drive: 6 plays, 65 yards, 3:37.**

**Second quarter**

- DAL – Brandon Aubrey 33-yard field goal, 14:04. Cowboys 10–7. **Drive: 16 plays, 56 yards, 7:39.**
- LAC – Ladd McConkey 25-yard pass from Justin Herbert (Cameron Dicker kick), 9:45. Chargers 14–10. **Drive: 7 plays, 87 yards, 4:19.**
- DAL – George Pickens 38-yard pass from Dak Prescott (Brandon Aubrey kick), 8:08. Cowboys 17–14. **Drive: 4 plays, 80 yards, 1:37.**
- LAC – Justin Herbert 1-yard run (Cameron Dicker kick), 0:19. Chargers 21–17. **Drive: 16 plays, 81 yards, 7:49.**

**Third quarter**

- LAC – Cameron Dicker 37-yard field goal, 11:51. Chargers 24–17. **Drive: 6 plays, 57 yards, 3:09.**

**Fourth quarter**

- LAC – Cameron Dicker 27-yard field goal, 8:57. Chargers 27–17. **Drive: 14 plays, 76 yards, 8:18.**
- LAC – Omarion Hampton 5-yard run (Cameron Dicker kick), 4:48. Chargers 34–17. **Drive: 6 plays, 46 yards, 2:09.**

**Top passers**

- LAC – Justin Herbert – 23/29, 300 yards, 2 TD
- DAL – Dak Prescott – 21/30, 244 yards, 2 TD

**Top rushers**

- LAC – Omarion Hampton – 16 rushes, 85 yards, TD
- DAL – Javonte Williams – 9 rushes, 34 yards

**Top receivers**

- LAC – Quentin Johnston – 4 receptions, 104 yards, TD
- DAL – George Pickens – 7 receptions, 130 yards, TD

Following the Eagles’ win over the Commanders from the previous day, the Cowboys were eliminated from playoff contention.

Despite a solid start, the Cowboys could not keep pace with the Chargers, and lost 34–17. It marked the Cowboys' first loss to the Chargers since 2017, and marked the Cowboys' third straight loss. They finished 2–2 against the AFC West (3–2 against the AFC) and 4–3–1 at home.

==== Week 17: at Washington Commanders ====
Christmas Day games

Week 17: Dallas Cowboys at Washington Commanders – Game summary

Quarter	1	2	3	4	Total
**Cowboys**	7	17	3	3	**30**
Commanders	3	7	10	3	**23**

at Northwest Stadium, Landover, Maryland

- Date: December 25
- Game time: 1:00 p.m. EST/12:00 p.m. CST
- Game weather: Sunny, 50 °F (10 °C)
- Game attendance: 64,407
- Referee: Brad Rogers
- TV announcers (KTVT/WUSA/Netflix
  Game exclusive to KTVT and WUSA. Out of market, game broadcast on Netflix.): Ian Eagle, Matt Ryan, Nate Burleson, Melanie Collins and Sara Walsh
- Recap, Game Book

Game information

**First quarter**

- DAL – Jake Ferguson 6-yard pass from Dak Prescott (Brandon Aubrey kick), 9:42. Cowboys 7–0. **Drive: 13 plays, 78 yards, 5:18.**
- WAS – Jake Moody 29-yard field goal, 4:44. Cowboys 7–3. **Drive: 8 plays, 65 yards, 4:58.**

**Second quarter**

- DAL – Javonte Williams 4-yard run (Brandon Aubrey kick), 12:06. Cowboys 14–3. **Drive: 17 plays, 65 yards, 7:38.**
- DAL – KaVontae Turpin 86-yard pass from Dak Prescott (Brandon Aubrey kick), 7:00. Cowboys 21–3. **Drive: 5 plays, 97 yards, 2:09.**
- WAS – Jacory Croskey-Merritt 10-yard run (Jake Moody kick), 4:35. Cowboys 21–10. **Drive: 5 plays, 60 yards, 2:25.**
- DAL – Brandon Aubrey 42-yard field goal, 0:19. Cowboys 24–10. **Drive: 12 plays, 50 yards, 4:16.**

**Third quarter**

- WAS – Jacory Croskey-Merritt 72-yard run (Jake Moody kick), 9:34. Cowboys 24–17. **Drive: 1 play, 72 yards, 0:10.**
- DAL – Brandon Aubrey 52-yard field goal, 4:42. Cowboys 27–17. **Drive: 11 plays, 53 yards, 4:52.**
- WAS – Jake Moody 23-yard field goal, 0:16. Cowboys 27–20. **Drive: 10 plays, 60 yards, 4:26.**

**Fourth quarter**

- DAL – Brandon Aubrey 51-yard field goal, 3:59. Cowboys 30–20. **Drive: 14 plays, 52 yards, 7:33.**
- WAS – Jake Moody 51-yard field goal, 2:09. Cowboys 30–23. **Drive: 7 plays, 39 yards, 1:50.**

**Top passers**

- DAL – Dak Prescott – 19/37, 307 yards, 2 TD
- WAS – Josh Johnson – 15/23, 198 yards

**Top rushers**

- DAL – Malik Davis – 20 rushes, 103 yards
- WAS – Jacory Croskey-Merritt – 11 rushes, 105 yards, 2 TD

**Top receivers**

- DAL – KaVontae Turpin – 1 reception, 86 yards, TD
- WAS – Deebo Samuel – 2 receptions, 68 yards

With the win, the Cowboys improved to 7–8–1 and 4–1 against the NFC East. This was the third time since 2021, the Cowboys had swept the Commanders.

==== Week 18: at New York Giants ====
Week 18: Dallas Cowboys at New York Giants – Game summary

Quarter	1	2	3	4	Total
Cowboys	10	0	0	7	**17**
**Giants**	6	10	8	10	**34**

at MetLife Stadium, East Rutherford, New Jersey

- Date: January 4
- Game time: 1:00 p.m. EST/12:00 p.m. CST
- Game weather: Fair, 33 °F (1 °C)
- Game attendance: 74,395
- Referee: Adrian Hill
- TV announcers (Fox): Kevin Kugler, Daryl Johnston and Allison Williams
- Recap, Game Book

Game information

**First quarter**

- NYG – Ben Sauls 45-yard field goal, 9:15. Giants 3–0. **Drive: 4 plays, 2 yards, 0:48.**
- DAL – Brandon Aubrey 22-yard field goal, 5:21. Tied 3–3. **Drive: 9 plays, 61 yards, 3:54.**
- NYG – Ben Sauls 35-yard field goal, 1:17. Giants 6–3. **Drive: 8 plays, 44 yards, 4:04.**
- DAL – Jaydon Blue 14-yard run (Brandon Aubrey kick), 0:28. Cowboys 10–6. **Drive: 2 plays, 11 yards, 0:49.**

**Second quarter**

- NYG – Ben Sauls 23-yard field goal, 9:45. Cowboys 10–9. **Drive: 11 plays, 61 yards, 5:43.**
- NYG – Daniel Bellinger 29-yard pass from Jaxson Dart (Ben Sauls kick), 0:20. Giants 16–10. **Drive: 11 plays, 96 yards, 2:29.**

**Third quarter**

- NYG – Tyrone Tracy Jr. 13-yard pass from Jaxson Dart (Devin Singletary–Darius Slayton pass), 9:48. Giants 24–10. **Drive: 6 plays, 62 yards, 2:47.**

**Fourth quarter**

- DAL – Phil Mafah 1-yard run (Brandon Aubrey kick), 14:57. Giants 24–17. **Drive: 10 plays, 69 yards, 5:08.**
- NYG – Ben Sauls 30-yard field goal, 9:23. Giants 27–17. **Drive: 11 plays, 61 yards, 5:34.**
- NYG – Devin Singletary 6-yard run (Ben Sauls kick), 5:47. Giants 34–17. **Drive: 6 plays, 33 yards, 3:23.**

**Top passers**

- DAL – Joe Milton III – 7/13, 73 yards, INT
- NYG – Jaxson Dart – 22/32, 230 yards, 2 TD

**Top rushers**

- DAL – Jaydon Blue – 16 rushes, 64 yards, TD
- NYG – Tyrone Tracy Jr. – 18 rushes, 103 yards

**Top receivers**

- DAL – Ryan Flournoy – 5 receptions, 68 yards
- NYG – Gunner Olszewski – 8 receptions, 102 yards

With their first loss to the Giants since 2020, the Cowboys finished their season at 7–9–1, 4–2 against the NFC East, and 3–6 on the road. The Cowboys allowed 511 points (30.1 per game) on the season, which was both a team-worst and an NFL-worst.

=== Standings ===
==== Division ====
NFC East
	W	L	T	PCT	DIV	CONF	PF	PA	STK
^{(3)} Philadelphia Eagles	11	6	0	.647	3–3	8–4	379	325	L1
Dallas Cowboys	7	9	1	.441	4–2	4–7–1	471	511	L1
Washington Commanders	5	12	0	.294	3–3	3–9	356	451	W1
New York Giants	4	13	0	.235	2–4	2–10	381	439	W2

==== Conference ====
NFC
Seed	Team	Division	W	L	T	PCT	DIV	CONF	SOS	SOV	STK
**Division leaders**
1	Seattle Seahawks	West	14	3	0	.824	4–2	9–3	.498	.471	W7
2 (Note: Chicago finished ahead of Philadelphia based on head-to-head victory.)	Chicago Bears	North	11	6	0	.647	2–4	7–5	.458	.406	L2
3	Philadelphia Eagles	East	11	6	0	.647	3–3	8–4	.476	.455	L1
4 (Note: Carolina finished ahead of Tampa Bay and Atlanta based on head-to-head record (Carolina 3–1 to Tampa Bay 2–2 and Atlanta 1–3).)	Carolina Panthers	South	8	9	0	.471	3–3	6–6	.522	.463	L2
**Wild cards**
5 (Note: LA Rams finished ahead of San Francisco based on common games (LA Rams 9–3 to San Francisco 8–4 against: Arizona, Atlanta, Carolina, Houston, Indianapolis, Jacksonville, New Orleans, Seattle, Tampa Bay and Tennessee).)	Los Angeles Rams	West	12	5	0	.706	4–2	7–5	.526	.485	W1
6	San Francisco 49ers	West	12	5	0	.706	4–2	9–3	.498	.417	L1
7	Green Bay Packers	North	9	7	1	.559	4–2	7–4–1	.483	.431	L4
**Did not qualify for the postseason**
8 (Note: Minnesota finished ahead of Detroit based on head-to-head sweep.)	Minnesota Vikings	North	9	8	0	.529	4–2	7–5	.514	.431	W5
9	Detroit Lions	North	9	8	0	.529	2–4	6–6	.490	.428	W1
10 (Note: Tampa Bay finished ahead of Atlanta based on common games (Tampa Bay 6–6 to Atlanta 5–7 against: Arizona, Buffalo, Carolina, LA Rams, Miami, New England, New Orleans, NY Jets, San Francisco and Seattle).)	Tampa Bay Buccaneers	South	8	9	0	.471	3–3	6–6	.529	.485	W1
11	Atlanta Falcons	South	8	9	0	.471	3–3	7–5	.495	.449	W4
12	Dallas Cowboys	East	7	9	1	.441	4–2	4–7–1	.438	.311	L1
13	New Orleans Saints	South	6	11	0	.353	3–3	4–8	.495	.333	L1
14	Washington Commanders	East	5	12	0	.294	3–3	3–9	.507	.388	W1
15	New York Giants	East	4	13	0	.235	2–4	2–10	.524	.478	W2
16	Arizona Cardinals	West	3	14	0	.176	0–6	3–9	.571	.422	L9
**Tiebreakers** (Note: When breaking ties for three or more teams under the NFL's rules, they are first broken within divisions, then comparing only the highest ranked remaining team from each division.)
