= Marshawn Kneeland =

American football player (2001–2025)

No. 94
- Position: Defensive end

Personal information
- Born: July 8, 2001; Grand Rapids, Michigan, U.S.
- Died: November 6, 2025 (aged 24); Frisco, Texas, U.S.
- Listed height: 6 ft 3 in (1.91 m)
- Listed weight: 268 lb (122 kg)

Career information
- High school: Godwin Heights (Wyoming, Michigan)
- College: Western Michigan (2019–2023)
- NFL draft: 2024: 2nd round, 56th overall pick

Career history
- Dallas Cowboys (2024–2025)

Awards and highlights
- Second-team All-MAC (2023)

Career NFL statistics
- Total tackles: 26
- Sacks: 1.0
- Fumble recoveries: 1
- Pass deflections: 1
- Touchdowns: 1
- Stats at Pro Football Reference

Marshawn Kneeland (July 8, 2001 – November 6, 2025) was an American professional football defensive end for the Dallas Cowboys of the National Football League (NFL). He played two seasons with the Cowboys until his suicide in 2025. Kneeland played college football for the Western Michigan Broncos, earning second-team Mid-American Conference (MAC) honors in 2023. He was selected by the Cowboys in the second round of the 2024 NFL draft.

During the 2025 season, Kneeland was involved in a police pursuit and was found dead from a gunshot wound hours later. His death was ruled a suicide.

== Early life ==
Marshawn Kneeland was born in Grand Rapids, Michigan, on July 8, 2001. He attended Godwin Heights High School in Wyoming, Michigan, where he became a starter at linebacker and tight end. As a junior, he collected 80 tackles, 15 sacks and 19 tackles for loss. He received All-conference and All-area honors.

As a senior, he recorded double-digit tackles in each of the first 5 contests of the season. He tallied 110 tackles, eight sacks, 15 tackles for loss, 20 receptions for 330 yards and five touchdowns, while receiving All-state, All-conference and All-area honors. He set the school record for career tackles, sacks and tackles for loss.

He also practiced track and field, winning the regional championship in the 400 metres and earning an all-conference selection in the high jump.

== College career ==
Kneeland accepted a scholarship from Western Michigan University. As a true freshman in 2019, he only appeared in one game as a backup during the 2019 First Responder Bowl against Western Kentucky University.

As a redshirt freshman in 2020, the football season was reduced to a six-game conference-only schedule due to the COVID-19 pandemic. He played in 5 contests with 3 starts, registering 23 tackles, 2.5 sacks and one forced fumble. He had 2 sacks in the opener against the University of Akron. He posted a season-best 6 solo tackles against Central Michigan University.

As a sophomore in 2021, he appeared in all 13 games with 3 starts, recording 32 tackles (7.5 tackles for loss) and 4.5 sacks. He had four tackles and 1.5 sacks against Illinois State University. He made 3 tackles and one sack in the 2021 Quick Lane Bowl against the University of Nevada, Reno.

As a junior in 2022, he played in 9 games with 7 starts, posting 37 tackles (10 for loss), 1.5 sacks, 5 quarterback hurries and 3 pass breakups. He had a season-high 10 tackles (2.5 for loss) against Eastern Michigan University. He made a season-high 3.0 tackles for loss against Ohio University.

As a senior in 2023, he decided to stay at Western Michigan, after initially accepting to transfer to the University of Colorado to play for head coach Deion Sanders. He appeared in 10 games with 9 starts, registering a career-high 57 tackles (7.5 tackles for loss), 4.5 sacks, 2 forced fumbles and 8 quarterback hurries, while receiving second-team All-MAC honors. He scored his only career touchdown on a one-yard run in the season opener against Saint Francis University. He made 7 tackles (one for loss) against Syracuse University. He had 6 tackles and one sack against the University of Iowa. He made a career-high 11 tackles (4 for loss), 3 sacks, one safety and one forced fumble that led toa defensive touchdown against Eastern Michigan University, receiving MAC West Defensive Player of the Week honors for his performance.

He finished his college career with 149 tackles, 12.5 sacks, 16 quarterback hurries, 3 pass-breakups and 3 forced fumbles. Despite not being heavily recruited out of high school, Kneeland became a high ranked prospect for the NFL and received an invitation to NFL Scouting Combine.

== Professional career ==
Pre-draft measurables
Height	Weight	Arm length	Hand span	Wingspan	40-yard dash	10-yard split	20-yard split	20-yard shuttle	Three-cone drill	Vertical jump	Broad jump	Bench press
6 ft 3 in (1.91 m)	267 lb (121 kg)	34 1/2 in (0.88 m)	9 1/8 in (0.23 m)	6 ft 11 3/8 in (2.12 m)	4.75 s	1.66 s	2.77 s	4.18 s	7.02 s	35.5 in (0.90 m)	9 ft 11 in (3.02 m)	21 reps
All values from NFL Combine

Kneeland was selected 56th overall in the second round of the 2024 NFL draft by the Dallas Cowboys.

=== 2024 season ===
In his rookie season, he appeared in 11 games with one start, recording 17 tackles (2 for loss), 13 quarterback pressures, one pass breakup and one fumble recovery. He made his debut against the Cleveland Browns on September 8.

He made his first career start against the Pittsburgh Steelers on October 6, collecting 2 tackles before leaving the game with a right knee injury, which occurred while he was attempting to sack quarterback Justin Fields. The injury required arthroscopic surgery and forced him to spend 5 weeks on injured reserve. He returned in Week 12 against the Washington Commanders, playing in 6 of the final 7 contests of the season as a backup.

=== 2025 season ===
Following the departure of DeMarcus Lawrence in free agency, he was as a primary rotational player behind Dante Fowler. During training camp, Kneeland was viewed as a possible breakout player on the Cowboys in 2025, intercepting quarterback Dak Prescott in a clip shared on Twitter, among other impact plays.

In early October, Kneeland was added to the injury report with an ankle injury he suffered during practice, and later aggravated it in the Week 6 game against the Carolina Panthers. In Week 9, three days before his death, Kneeland scored his only NFL touchdown, after recovering a blocked punt in the end zone against the Arizona Cardinals. He appeared in 7 games (missed 2 with an ankle injury), posting 16 tackles (2 for loss), one sack, and 6 quarterback pressures.

He died by suicide during the team's bye week, before the game against the Las Vegas Raiders, which would invoke memories of 2012, when the Cowboys played the Cincinnati Bengals after linebacker Jerry Brown tragically passed away the previous day. The Cowboys would end up beating the Raiders 33-16, head coach Brian Schottenheimer and Dallas players wore tribute shirts in his honor, held a pre-game moment of silence, and featured his number (94) in team tributes. Players from both teams gathered at midfield and walked together carrying his jersey after the contest.

== NFL career statistics ==
Legend
**Bold**	Career high

Year	Team	Games		Tackles					Interceptions						Fumbles		
Year	Team	GP	GS	Cmb	Solo	Ast	Sck	Sfty	PD	Int	Yds	Avg	Lng	TD	FF	FR	TD
2024	DAL	**11**	1	**14**	**9**	5	0.0	0	**1**	0	0	0.0	0	0	0	**1**	0
2025	DAL	7	**3**	12	6	**6**	**1.0**	0	0	0	0	0.0	0	0	0	0	0
Career		18	4	26	15	11	1.0	0	1	0	0	0.0	0	0	0	1	0

== Personal life and death ==
Kneeland's mother died unexpectedly of an undisclosed illness in February 2024, two months before he was drafted by the Cowboys. He carried her ashes with him at all times in a necklace. New England Patriots defensive back Mike Brown was Kneeland's cousin.

Kneeland lived in Plano, Texas. He died in Frisco, Texas, on November 6, 2025, at age 24, during his second season in the NFL. On the same date, the Texas Department of Public Safety reported that Kneeland had been involved in a police pursuit the previous night after failing to stop for a traffic violation. Officers ended the chase after losing sight of his vehicle. His girlfriend, Catalina Mancera, later told police that he was armed, had a history of mental illness, and would "end it all". According to police, they responded to a "welfare concern" at Kneeland's apartment complex, but no one was home. His vehicle was later found abandoned after a crash. Police said he was discovered dead nearby "from what appeared to be a self-inflicted gunshot wound." Local authorities ruled his death a suicide.

Following his death, the Cowboys released a statement describing him as a "beloved teammate" and offering thoughts and prayers to his family. It was also revealed that Catalina Mancera was pregnant with the couple's only child. In June 2026, Mancera announced on Instagram that she had given birth to their son. The following July, the Concussion and CTE Foundation announced that Kneeland had stage one chronic traumatic encephalopathy (CTE), based on post‑mortem brain tissue analysis.

== See also ==
- List of gridiron football players who died during their careers
