= Malik Davis =

American football player (born 1998)

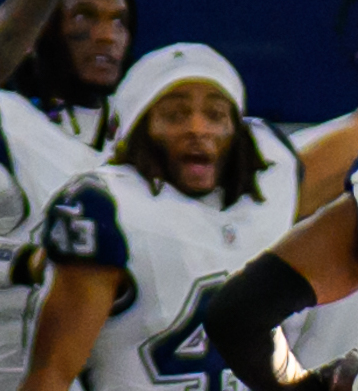
- Davis in 2025

No. 20 – Dallas Cowboys
- Position: Running back
- Roster status: Injured reserve

Personal information
- Born: November 26, 1998 (age 27); Tampa, Florida, U.S.
- Listed height: 5 ft 10 in (1.78 m)
- Listed weight: 205 lb (93 kg)

Career information
- High school: Jesuit (Tampa)
- College: Florida (2017–2021)
- NFL draft: 2022: undrafted

Career history
- Dallas Cowboys (2022–present)

Career NFL statistics as of 2025
- Rushing yards: 411
- Rushing average: 4.6
- Rushing touchdowns: 3
- Receptions: 8
- Receiving yards: 79
- Stats at Pro Football Reference

Malik Davis (born November 26, 1998) is an American professional football running back for the Dallas Cowboys of the National Football League (NFL). He played college football for the Florida Gators from 2017 to 2021.

== Early life ==
Davis attended Jesuit High School, where he was a three-year starter at running back.

As a junior, he registered 2,337 rushing yards and 28 touchdowns. He was named the 2016 Hillsborough Offensive Player of the Year by the Tampa Bay Times, he was named to the 2016 Class 5A All-State team and received the 2016 Guy Toph Award, which is given to Hillsborough County's most outstanding football player

As a senior, he had a county-best 2,469 rushing yards and 33 touchdowns, contributing to his team having a 12-1 and winning the 5A state championship game. He finished as the all-time rushing leader in the county with 7,025 career yards, surpassing the mark set by Ray-Ray McCloud. He also averaged 8.5 yards an attempt, including 11.5 yards per carry as a senior and totaled 83 career touchdowns. He received PrepStar Magazine All-Southeast Region Class honors.

== College career ==
Davis accepted a football scholarship from the University of Florida. As a true freshman in 2017, he appeared in 7 games (2 starts), before suffering a season-ending injury in the seventh game against the University of Georgia. He finished second on the team in rushing with 526 yards on 79 carries and also had 2 rushing touchdowns. He had 5 games with over 90 rushing yards, including a career-high 124 against Vanderbilt University, where he became the first true freshman in the SEC to score two rushing touchdowns in a single-game. He was named to the Coaches Freshman All-SEC Team.

As a sophomore in 2018, he appeared in just three games before sustaining a season-ending knee injury against Colorado State University. He received a medical redshirt. He tallied 13 carries for 61 yards and 3 receptions for 33 yards before he was lost for the season.

As a redshirt sophomore in 2019, he played in 12 games at running back, tallying 86 yards and one touchdown on 34 carries, while making 6 receptions for 41 yards. He also was a part of the special teams unit. He had a season-best 22 rushing yards against Towson University.

As a redshirt junior in 2020, he appeared in all 12 games of the season with 2 starts. He collected 66 carries for 310 yards and 31 receptions for 377 yards. He had a season-high 81 rushing yards against Louisiana State University. He started during the SEC Championship Game against the University of Alabama, tallying one carry for 2 yards on one carry and 2 receptions for 15 yards.

As a redshirt senior in 2021, he started at running back in 12 of 13 games, rushing 92 times for 487 yards and 5 touchdowns, to go along with 23 receptions for 217 yards and 2 receiving touchdowns. In season opener against Florida Atlantic University, he ran 14 times for 104 yards and one touchdown, for the second 100-yard rushing game of his career. In the Gasparilla Bowl against the University of Central Florida, he had 7 carries for 86 yards and one touchdown.

=== College statistics ===
		Rushing					Receiving			
Season	Team	GP	Att	Yds	Avg	TD	Rec	Yds	Avg	TD
2017	Florida	7	79	526	6.7	2	7	58	8.3	0
2018	Florida	3	13	61	4.7	0	3	33	11.0	0
2019	Florida	12	34	86	2.5	1	6	41	6.8	0
2020	Florida	12	66	310	4.7	0	31	377	12.2	0
2021	Florida	12	92	487	5.3	5	23	217	9.4	2
Totals		46	284	1,470	5.2	8	70	726	10.4	2

== Professional career ==
Pre-draft measurables
Height	Weight	Arm length	Hand span	Wingspan	40-yard dash	10-yard split	20-yard split	20-yard shuttle	Three-cone drill	Vertical jump	Broad jump	Bench press
5 ft 9 7/8 in (1.77 m)	202 lb (92 kg)	31 3/8 in (0.80 m)	9 1/4 in (0.23 m)	6 ft 3 in (1.91 m)	4.66 s	1.55 s	2.69 s	4.25 s	7.11 s	39.5 in (1.00 m)	10 ft 7 in (3.23 m)	10 reps
All values from Pro Day

After going undrafted in the 2022 NFL draft, Davis signed with the Dallas Cowboys as a free agent on April 30, 2022. He was part of the last cuts to reach the 53 player limit and was signed with the Dallas' practice squad on August 31. On October 15, Davis was elevated to the active roster. He was signed to the active roster on October 29. In Week 13, in a 54–19 win over the Indianapolis Colts, Davis scored his first NFL rushing touchdown. As a rookie, he became the team's third running back after Rico Dowdle was lost for the season in October. He was used sparingly in 12 games, making 38 carries for 161 yards and one touchdown.

In 2023, despite starter Ezekiel Elliott leaving, Davis was passed on the depth chart by Tony Pollard, Dowdle, Deuce Vaughn and Hunter Luepke. He was waived on August 29, 2023 and re-signed to the practice squad. He appeared in 3 games as an injury replacement and did not record any stat.

He signed a reserve/future contract with Dallas on January 17, 2024. He was waived by the Cowboys on August 27, 2024, and re-signed to the practice squad. He did not appear in any games.

Davis signed a reserve/future contract with the Cowboys on January 8, 2025. He was waived on April 30, to clear roster space for rookies Jaydon Blue and Phil Mafah. He was re-signed on August 8, to provide depth for the last 2 preseason games. Davis was waived again on August 26 as part of final roster cuts and re-signed to the practice squad the next day. He was promoted to the active roster on November 3. Davis was waived the following day, and was re-signed to the practice squad three days later. In Week 11 against the Las Vegas Raiders, he became the team's backup behind Javonte Williams, after Miles Sanders was lost to injury and Blue couldn't produce. Davis was promoted back to the active roster on November 22. In Week 13 against the Kansas City Chiefs, he had a 43-yard rushing touchdown. In Week 17 against the Washington Commanders, he had 20 carries for 103 rushing yards. On January 3, 2026, Davis was placed on season-ending injured reserve due to calf and eye injuries suffered in Week 17 against the Washington Commanders. He finished with 250 yards on 52 carries and 2 touchdowns.

In 2026, Davis won the backup running back job behind Williams in preseason. On September 11, 2026, Davis was placed on injured reserve due to a 'serious' hip injury during a practice.

=== NFL statistics ===
Legend
**Bold**	Career high

Year	Team	Games		Rushing					Receiving					Kickoff return					Fumbles	
Year	Team	GP	GS	Att	Yds	Avg	Lng	TD	Rec	Yds	Avg	Lng	TD	Ret	Yds	Avg	Lng	TD	Fum	Lost
2022	DAL	**12**	0	38	161	4.2	23	1	**6**	**63**	**10.5**	**18**	0	-	-	-	-	-	0	0
2023	DAL	3	0	0	0	0.0	0	0	0	0	0.0	0	0	-	-	-	-	-	0	0
2024	DAL	-	-	-	-	-	-	-	-	-	-	-	-	-	-	-	-	-	-	-
2025	DAL	10	0	**52**	**250**	**4.8**	**43**	**2**	2	16	8.0	10	0	-	-	-	-	-	0	0
2026	DAL	0	0	0	0	0.0	0	0	0	0	0.0	0	0	0	0	0	0	0	0	0
Career		25	0	90	411	4.6	43	3	8	79	8.0	18	0	-	-	-	-	-	0	0
