= Jake Ferguson =

American football player (born 1999)

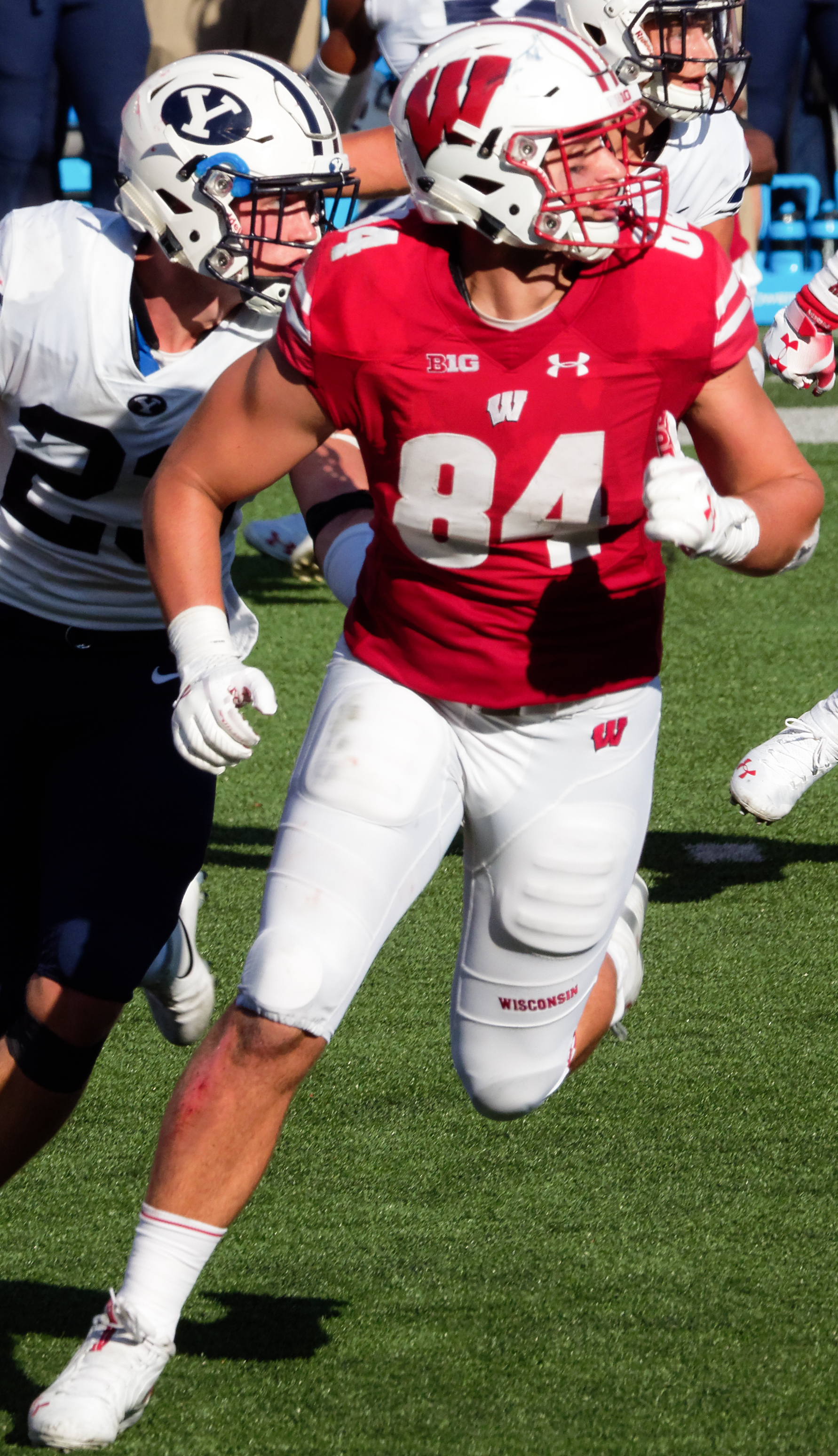
- Ferguson with the Wisconsin Badgers in 2018

No. 87 – Dallas Cowboys
- Position: Tight end
- Roster status: Active

Personal information
- Born: January 18, 1999 (age 27); Rapid City, South Dakota, U.S.
- Listed height: 6 ft 5 in (1.96 m)
- Listed weight: 250 lb (113 kg)

Career information
- High school: James Madison Memorial High School (Madison, Wisconsin)
- College: Wisconsin (2017–2021)
- NFL draft: 2022: 4th round, 129th overall pick

Career history
- Dallas Cowboys (2022–present)

Awards and highlights
- 2× Pro Bowl (2023, 2025); First-team All-Big Ten (2021)

Career NFL statistics as of Week 3, 2026
- Receptions: 240
- Receiving yards: 2,101
- Receiving touchdowns: 18
- Stats at Pro Football Reference

Jonathan Quinn "Jake" Ferguson (born January 18, 1999) is an American professional football tight end for the Dallas Cowboys of the National Football League (NFL). He played college football for the Wisconsin Badgers and was selected by the Cowboys in the fourth round of the 2022 NFL draft.

== Early life ==
Ferguson attended James Madison Memorial High School (now known as Vel Phillips Memorial High School) in Madison, Wisconsin. He played wide receiver and linebacker in high school. During his career, Ferguson had 1,795 receiving yards and 15 touchdowns on offense and 314 tackles, five sacks, and five interceptions on defense. He committed to the University of Wisconsin to play college football.

== College career ==
Ferguson played at Wisconsin from 2017 to 2021. After redshirting his first year in 2017, Ferguson played in 47 games over the next four years, recording 145 receptions for 1,618 yards and 13 touchdowns. As a senior, he broke Lee Evans' school record for consecutive games with a reception.

=== College statistics ===
Season	Team	GP	Receiving				
Season	Team	GP	Rec	Yds	Avg	Lng	TD
2018	Wisconsin	13	36	456	12.7	36	4
2019	Wisconsin	14	33	407	12.3	28	2
2020	Wisconsin	7	30	305	10.2	34	4
2021	Wisconsin	13	46	450	9.8	35	3
Career		47	145	1,618	11.2	36	13

== Professional career ==
Pre-draft measurables
Height	Weight	Arm length	Hand span	Wingspan	40-yard dash	10-yard split	20-yard split	20-yard shuttle	Three-cone drill	Vertical jump	Broad jump	Bench press
6 ft 4 7/8 in (1.95 m)	250 lb (113 kg)	32 5/8 in (0.83 m)	9 1/2 in (0.24 m)	6 ft 5 1/4 in (1.96 m)	4.77 s	1.61 s	2.68 s	4.48 s	7.03 s	34.5 in (0.88 m)	9 ft 10 in (3.00 m)	15 reps
All values from NFL Combine/Pro Day

Ferguson was selected by the Dallas Cowboys in the fourth round (129th overall) of the 2022 NFL draft. In Week 6, he scored his first NFL touchdown on a seven-yard touchdown reception in the 26–17 loss to the Philadelphia Eagles. He finished his rookie season with 19 receptions for 174 yards and two touchdowns in 16 games and eight starts. In the 2023 season, he recorded 71 receptions for 761 yards and five touchdowns in 17 games and 16 starts. In the Cowboys' Wild Card Round loss to the Packers, he had 10 receptions for 93 yards and three touchdowns.

On July 27, 2025, Ferguson signed a four-year, $52 million contract extension with the Cowboys, keeping him under contract through the 2029 season.

== NFL career statistics ==
Legend
**Bold**	Career high

=== Regular season ===
Year	Team	Games		Receiving							Fumbles	
Year	Team	GP	GS	Tgt	Rec	Yds	Avg	Lng	Y/G	TD	Fum	Lost
2022	DAL	16	8	22	19	174	9.2	30	10.9	2	0	0
2023	DAL	**17**	**16**	**102**	71	**761**	**10.7**	**40**	**44.8**	5	0	0
2024	DAL	14	14	86	59	494	8.4	25	35.3	0	**4**	**2**
2025	DAL	**17**	10	**102**	**82**	600	7.3	26	35.3	**8**	3	**2**
Career		64	48	312	231	2,029	8.8	40	31.7	15	7	4

=== Postseason ===
Year	Team	Games		Receiving							Fumbles	
Year	Team	GP	GS	Tgt	Rec	Yds	Avg	Lng	Y/G	TD	Fum	Lost
2022	DAL	**2**	**2**	1	1	34	**34.0**	**34**	17.0	0	0	0
2023	DAL	1	1	**12**	**10**	**93**	9.3	22	**93.0**	**3**	0	0
Career		3	3	13	11	127	11.5	34	42.3	3	0	0

== Personal life ==
Ferguson's grandfather is former Wisconsin head coach and athletic director Barry Alvarez. He is of Spanish descent through his family roots in Asturias, Spain. Ferguson has spoken publicly about his ancestry and has worn the Spanish flag on his helmet during NFL games to honor his heritage.

Ferguson began a relationship with Haley Cavinder in 2023, and the pair announced their engagement in April 2025. They married on June 20, 2026.
