= Alijah Clark =

American football player (born 2003)

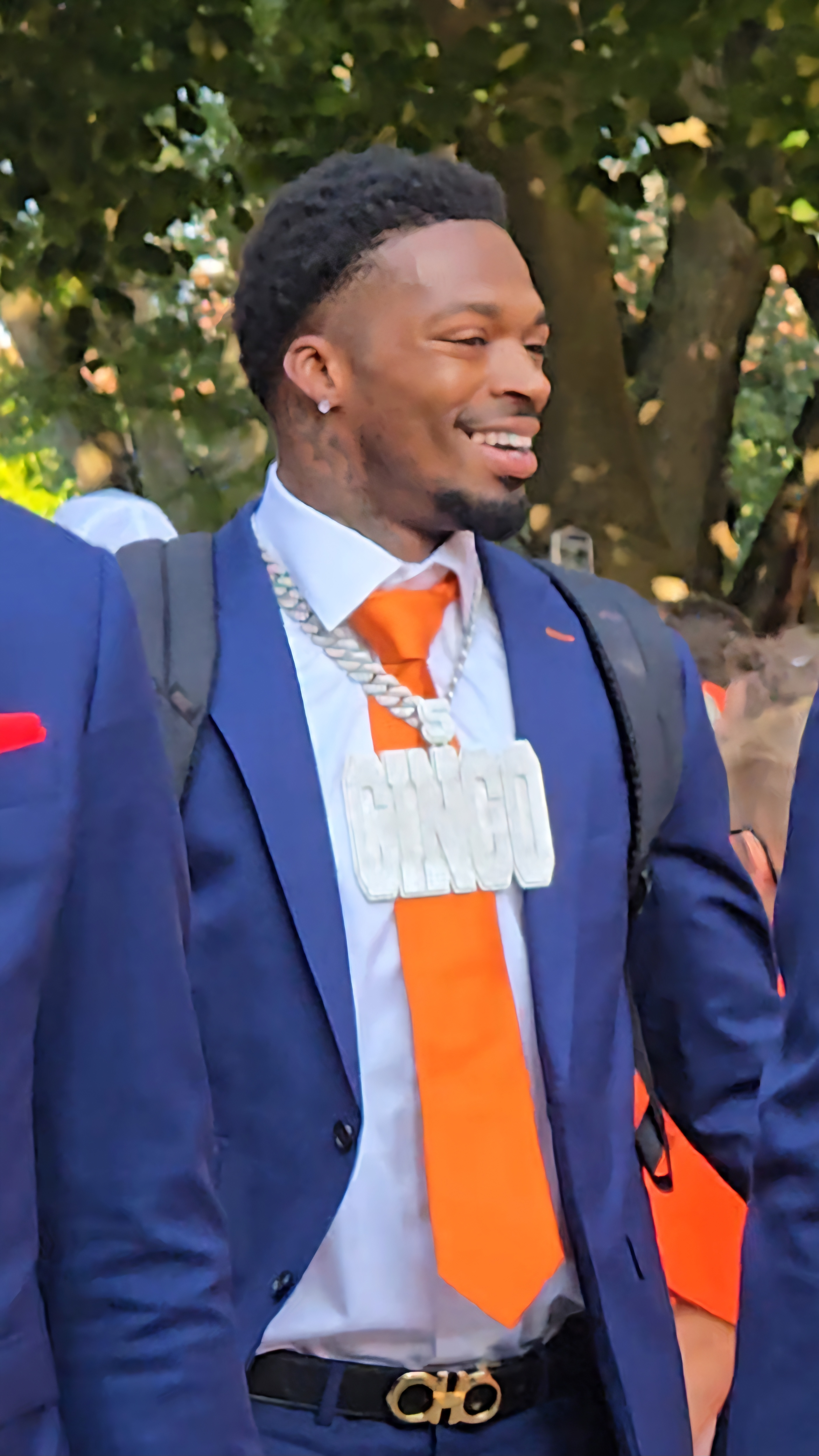
- Clark at Syracuse University in 2024

No. 11 – Dallas Cowboys
- Position: Safety
- Roster status: Active

Personal information
- Born: July 11, 2003 (age 23); Camden, New Jersey, U.S.
- Listed height: 6 ft 1 in (1.85 m)
- Listed weight: 200 lb (91 kg)

Career information
- High school: Camden (NJ)
- College: Rutgers (2021); Syracuse (2022–2024)
- NFL draft: 2025: undrafted

Career history
- Dallas Cowboys (2025–present)

Career NFL statistics as of Week 5, 2026
- Total tackles: 24
- Forced fumbles: 1
- Pass deflections: 1
- Stats at Pro Football Reference

Alijah Clark (born July 11, 2003) is an American professional football safety for the Dallas Cowboys of the National Football League (NFL). He played college football for the Rutgers Scarlet Knights and Syracuse Orange.

== Early life ==
Clark attended Camden High School in Camden, New Jersey. As a sophomore, he put up 285 receiving yards, five receiving touchdowns, 174 rushing yards and two rushing scores, along with 35 tackles, five interceptions, seven pass deflections, and a fumble recovery for a touchdown on defense. Coming out of high school he was rated as a four-star recruit and committed to play college football for the Rutgers Scarlet Knights over held offers from schools such as Temple, N.C. State, West Virginia, UMass, Maryland, Kentucky, Purdue, Miami, Ohio state, Florida, and Florida State.

== College career ==
=== Rutgers ===
As a freshman in 2021, Clark appeared in seven games, where he notched six tackles and an interception; he entered his name into the NCAA transfer portal after the season.

=== Syracuse ===
Clark transferred to play for the Syracuse Orange. In 2022, he tallied 55 tackles in 12 starts. In the 2023 season opener, Clark notched seven tackles and a fumble recovery in a win over Colgate. In week 4 of the 2023 season, he notched a game-high eight tackles in a win over Army. During the 2023 season, Clark notched 65 tackles, three pass deflections, two fumble recoveries, and a forced fumble. In 2024, he recorded 61 tackles with three being for a loss, four pass deflections, and an interception in 12 games. After the season, Clark declared for the 2025 NFL draft, while also accepting an invite to participate in the 2025 East-West Shrine Bowl.

=== College statistics ===
| Season | Team | GP | Tackles | | | | | Interceptions | | | | Fumbles | |
| Season | Team | GP | Cmb | Solo | Ast | TfL | Sck | PD | Int | Yds | TD | FF | FR |
|---|---|---|---|---|---|---|---|---|---|---|---|---|---|
| 2021 | Rutgers | 7 | 6 | 2 | 4 | 0.5 | 0.0 | 0 | 1 | 0 | 0 | 0 | 0 |
| 2022 | Syracuse | 12 | 56 | 31 | 25 | 2.5 | 0.0 | 2 | 0 | 0 | 0 | 0 | 0 |
| 2023 | Syracuse | 13 | 66 | 38 | 28 | 4.5 | 0.0 | 3 | 0 | 0 | 0 | 1 | 0 |
| 2024 | Syracuse | 12 | 61 | 35 | 26 | 2.5 | 0.0 | 4 | 1 | -2 | 0 | 0 | 0 |
| Career | | 44 | 189 | 106 | 83 | 10.0 | 0.0 | 9 | 2 | -2 | 0 | 1 | 0 |

== Professional career ==
Pre-draft measurables
| Height | Weight | Arm length | Hand span | Wingspan | 40-yard dash | 10-yard split | 20-yard split | 20-yard shuttle | Three-cone drill | Vertical jump | Broad jump |
|---|---|---|---|---|---|---|---|---|---|---|---|
| 6 ft 0 3/4 in (1.85 m) | 188 lb (85 kg) | 30 7/8 in (0.78 m) | 9 1/2 in (0.24 m) | 6 ft 5 3/4 in (1.97 m) | 4.50 s | 1.53 s | 2.61 s | 4.21 s | 6.79 s | 33.0 in (0.84 m) | 10 ft 2 in (3.10 m) |
All values from NFL Combine/Pro Day

Clark signed with the Dallas Cowboys as an undrafted free agent on May 2, 2025. He was waived on August 26 as part of final roster cuts and was re-signed to the practice squad the next day. On October 4, Clark was signed to the active roster. On November 23, against the Philadelphia Eagles, Clark forced a fumble on a key punt return during the Cowboys' 24-21 comeback victory.

== NFL career statistics ==
Legend
| **Bold** | Career high |

=== Regular season ===
| Year | Team | Games | | Tackles | | | | Fumbles | | | | Interceptions | | | |
| Year | Team | GP | GS | Cmb | Solo | Ast | Sck | FF | FR | Yds | TD | Int | Yds | TD | PD |
|---|---|---|---|---|---|---|---|---|---|---|---|---|---|---|---|
| 2025 | DAL | **11** | **1** | **15** | **9** | **9** | 0.0 | **1** | 0 | 0 | 0 | 0 | 0 | 0 | 0 |
| 2026 | DAL | 5 | 0 | 6 | 4 | 2 | 0.0 | 0 | 0 | 0 | 0 | 0 | 0 | 0 | 1 |
| Career | | 16 | 1 | 24 | 13 | 11 | 0.0 | 1 | 0 | 0 | 0 | 0 | 0 | 0 | 1 |
