= Ryan Flournoy =

American football player (born 1999)

- Flournoy in 2025

No. 19 – Dallas Cowboys
- Position: Wide receiver
- Roster status: Active

Personal information
- Born: October 27, 1999 (age 27); Hazel Crest, Illinois, U.S.
- Listed height: 6 ft 1 in (1.85 m)
- Listed weight: 205 lb (93 kg)

Career information
- High school: Homewood-Flossmoor (Flossmoor, Illinois)
- College: Central Missouri (2018–2020); Iowa Western CC (2021); Southeast Missouri State (2022–2023)
- NFL draft: 2024: 6th round, 216th overall pick

Career history
- Dallas Cowboys (2024–present)

Awards and highlights
- First-team All-OVC (2022)

Career NFL statistics as of Week 3, 2026
- Receptions: 59
- Receiving yards: 644
- Receiving touchdowns: 4
- Rushing yards: 25
- Stats at Pro Football Reference

Ryan Flournoy (/fləˈnɔɪ/ flə-NOY; born October 27, 1999) is an American professional football wide receiver for the Dallas Cowboys of the National Football League (NFL). He played college football for the Central Missouri Mules, Iowa Western Reivers, and Southeast Missouri State Redhawks. Flournoy was selected by the Cowboys in the sixth round of the 2024 NFL draft.

== Early life ==
Flournoy was born on October 27, 1999, and grew up in Hazel Crest, Illinois. He grew up a fan of the Chicago Bears and watched highlights of players such as Gale Sayers and Walter Payton, deciding his goal was to become a National Football League (NFL) player at age five. Flournoy first played football at age five and continued while attending Homewood-Flossmoor High School in Flossmoor, Illinois, where he played wide receiver.

At Homewood-Flossmoor, where Flournoy also ran track, he saw limited playing time in his few years before having his best year as a senior, totaling 28 receptions for 480 yards and seven touchdowns. Flournoy ceived little attention as a recruit and enrolled at NCAA Division II school Central Missouri.

== College career ==
Flournoy redshirted his first year at Central Missouri in 2018. He missed the start of his second season due to injury and posted 17 receptions for 170 yards upon returning, while dealing with a partially-torn ACL.

The 2020 season was canceled due to the COVID-19 pandemic, and Flournoy transferred to Iowa Western Community College in 2021. With Iowa Western, he was the team's top receiver and totaled 32 receptions for 545 yards and five touchdowns, helping them reach the NJCAA national championship, where Flournoy scored each of the team's touchdowns in their 31–13 loss.

Flournoy had one offer to play NCAA Division I football, which was from the FCS Southeast Missouri State Redhawks, and transferred there in 2022. He became a top player for the team, becoming captain in his first year and recording 61 receptions for 984 yards and seven touchdowns in 2022 while being chosen first-team All-Ohio Valley Conference (OVC). Flournoy returned for a final season in 2023, being named to The Athletic's college football "Freaks List" entering the year. He repeated as a first-team all-conference selection despite missing time due to a broken hand, ending the year with 57 receptions for 839 yards and six touchdowns. Flournoy graduated from Southeast Missouri State in December 2023 with a degree in general studies. He was invited to the Hula Bowl, the East–West Shrine Bowl, the 2024 Senior Bowl, and to the NFL Scouting Combine. At the Senior Bowl, Flournoy s among the only FCS players and was the first Southeast Missouri State player selected since 1998.

== Professional career ==
Pre-draft measurables
Height	Weight	Arm length	Hand span	Wingspan	40-yard dash	10-yard split	20-yard split	20-yard shuttle	Three-cone drill	Vertical jump	Broad jump	Bench press
6 ft 0 3/4 in (1.85 m)	202 lb (92 kg)	31 5/8 in (0.80 m)	10 1/8 in (0.26 m)	6 ft 4 1/8 in (1.93 m)	4.44 s	1.53 s	2.57 s	4.37 s	7.08 s	39.5 in (1.00 m)	11 ft 0 in (3.35 m)	19 reps
All values from NFL Combine/Pro Day

Flournoy was selected by the Dallas Cowboys in the sixth round (216th overall) of the 2024 NFL draft. He made 11 appearances for Dallas as a rookie, recording 10 receptions for 102 yards.

Flournoy was waived by the Cowboys on August 28, 2025, and re-signed to the practice squad. He was promoted to the active roster on September 13. In Week 5 against the New York Jets, Flournoy logged six receptions for a then career-high 114 yards, more receiving yards than he recorded in 11 games as a rookie. During Week 9 against the Arizona Cardinals, Flournoy caught his first career touchdown on a five-yard reception from Dak Prescott.

On December 4, 2025, in a Week 14 Thursday Night Football matchup at the Detroit Lions, Flournoy recorded career highs in targets (12), receptions (9) and yards (115).

On September 11, 2026, Flournoy signed a one-year, $6 million contract extension with the Cowboys that runs through the 2027 season.

=== Regular season ===
Year	Team	Games		Receiving					Rushing					Fumbles	
Year	Team	GP	GS	Rec	Yds	Avg	Lng	TD	Att	Yds	Avg	Lng	TD	Fum	Lost
2024	DAL	11	1	10	102	10.2	26	0	0	0	0.0	0	0	1	1
2025	DAL	16	4	40	475	11.9	46	4	4	25	6.3	12	0	0	0
2026	DAL	8	4	30	342	11.4	48	2	1	3	3.0	3	0	0	0
Career		35	9	80	919	11.5	48	6	5	28	5.6	12	0	1	1
