= Javonte Williams =

American football player (born 2000)

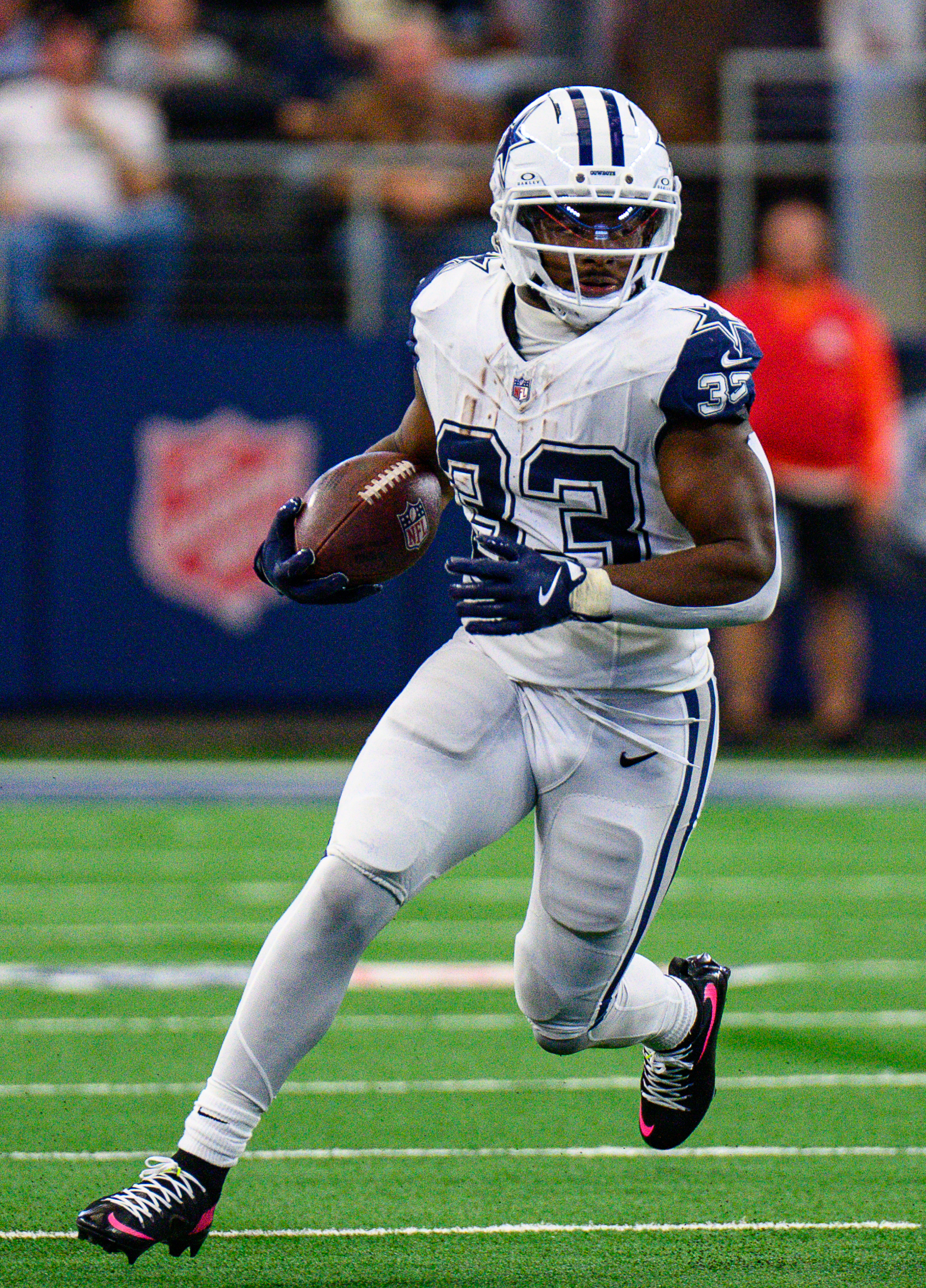
- Williams with the Dallas Cowboys in 2025

No. 33 – Dallas Cowboys
- Position: Running back
- Roster status: Active

Personal information
- Born: April 25, 2000 (age 26); Wallace, North Carolina, U.S.
- Listed height: 5 ft 10 in (1.78 m)
- Listed weight: 222 lb (101 kg)

Career information
- High school: Wallace-Rose Hill (Teachey, North Carolina)
- College: North Carolina (2018–2020)
- NFL draft: 2021: 2nd round, 35th overall pick

Career history
- Denver Broncos (2021–2024); Dallas Cowboys (2025–present)

Awards and highlights
- PFWA All-Rookie Team (2021); Second-team All-American (2020); Second-team All-ACC (2020)

Career NFL statistics as of Week 10, 2026
- Rushing yards: 4,293
- Rushing average: 4.2
- Rushing touchdowns: 31
- Receptions: 218
- Receiving yards: 1,234
- Receiving touchdowns: 8
- Stats at Pro Football Reference

Javonte Williams (born April 25, 2000) is an American professional football running back for the Dallas Cowboys of the National Football League (NFL). He played college football for the North Carolina Tar Heels and was selected by the Denver Broncos in the second round of the 2021 NFL draft.

== Early life ==
Williams attended Wallace-Rose Hill High School in Teachey, North Carolina. He helped lead the Wallace-Rose Hill football team to four straight NCHSAA state championship victories, winning the 2A championship in 2017, and the 1AA championship in 2014, 2015, and 2016. As a senior, he rushed for 2,271 rushing yards and 27 touchdowns. He committed to the University of North Carolina at Chapel Hill, his only Football Bowl Subdivision (FBS) offer. He graduated as his school’s valedictorian with a 4.6 GPA.

== College career ==
As a true freshman at North Carolina in 2018, Williams played in 11 games, rushing 43 times for 224 yards and five touchdowns. As a sophomore in 2019, he played in all 13 games and shared carries with Michael Carter. He ran for 933 yards on 166 carries with five touchdowns. Williams returned to North Carolina in 2020 and again shared carries with Carter. Throughout the 2020 season, Williams was statistically one of the top running backs in the country. Williams' name was mentioned during the season as a "dark horse" candidate for the 2020 Heisman Trophy. Against Miami (FL), Williams and backfield counterpart Carter combined for an NCAA-record 544 rushing yards as a duo in the Tar Heels' 62–26 blowout victory. Williams and Carter were both named to the 2020 Pro Football Focus First-team All-America at the running back position. PFF also named him the 2020 ACC Football Player of the Year with a record-breaking 95.9 PFF rushing grade, the highest rushing grade in a single season since the site began covering college players.

== Professional career ==
Pre-draft measurables
Height	Weight	Arm length	Hand span	Wingspan	40-yard dash	10-yard split	20-yard split	20-yard shuttle	Three-cone drill	Vertical jump	Broad jump	Bench press
5 ft 9 5/8 in (1.77 m)	212 lb (96 kg)	30 7/8 in (0.78 m)	9 3/8 in (0.24 m)	6 ft 2 7/8 in (1.90 m)	4.55 s	1.60 s	2.63 s	4.09 s	6.93 s	36.0 in (0.91 m)	10 ft 3 in (3.12 m)	22 reps
All values from Pro Day

=== Denver Broncos ===
==== 2021 ====
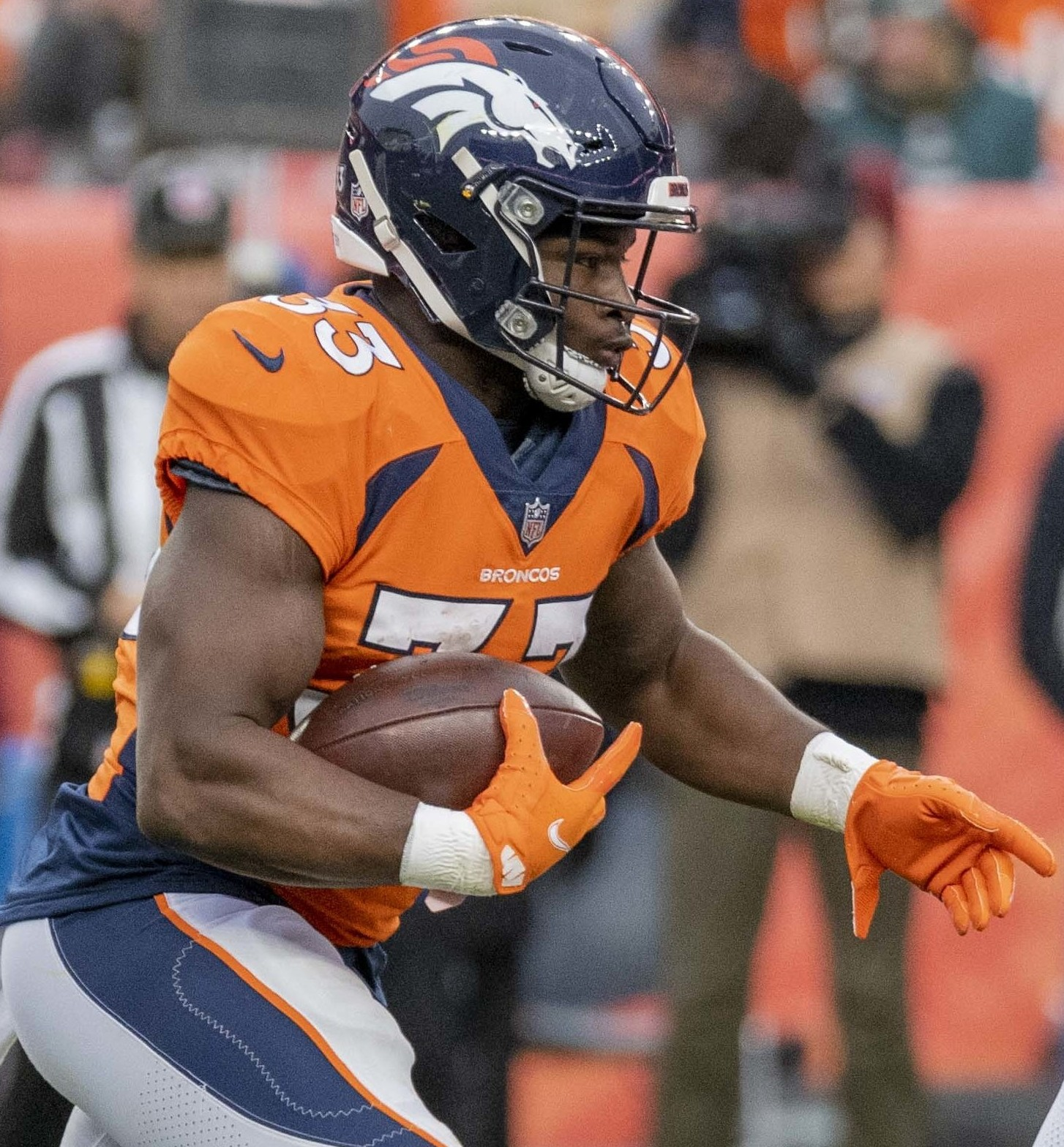
Williams with the Broncos in 2021

Williams was selected by the Denver Broncos in the second round, 35th overall, of the 2021 NFL draft. Williams signed his four-year rookie contract with Denver on July 23, 2021.

Heading into his first training camp, Williams competed with Royce Freeman and Mike Boone for the backup running back role. After the Broncos released Freeman during final roster cuts, they officially named Williams the backup running back, behind veteran starter Melvin Gordon.

Williams made his NFL debut in the Broncos' Week 1 victory against the New York Giants, recording 14 carries for 45 yards. Williams scored his first professional rushing touchdown against the New York Jets in Week 3, as the Broncos won the game 26–0. In Week 9, against the Dallas Cowboys, he had his first game going over 100 rushing yards with 111 on 17 carries. Williams received his first career start in Week 12 against the Kansas City Chiefs, as he replaced an injured Melvin Gordon. Williams finished the game with 23 carries for 102 yards, six receptions for 76 yards and a receiving touchdown, though the Broncos lost the game 22–9.

Overall, Williams finished his rookie season appearing in all 17 games (one start) and recorded 203 carries for 903 yards (4.4 YPC) and four rushing touchdowns plus 43 receptions for 319 yards and three receiving touchdowns. He was named to the PFWA All-Rookie Team.

==== 2022 ====
In Week 1, Williams had 108 scrimmage yards and a lost fumble in the 16–17 loss to the Seattle Seahawks. In the loss, he had 11 receptions. During Week 4 against the Las Vegas Raiders, Williams went down with a knee injury and left the game. It was later revealed that he suffered tears to the ACL, LCL, and posterolateral corner. The injury prematurely ended his 2022 season.

==== 2023 ====
In the 2023 season, Williams had 217 carries for a team-high 774 rushing yards and three rushing touchdowns to go with 47 receptions for 228 receiving yards and two receiving touchdowns in 16 games and 13 starts.

==== 2024 ====
In the leadup to the 2024 season, there was hope that Williams, now two years removed from his major injury, could potentially reach his rookie-season level of production once again. However, after the conclusion of the season the general consensus was Williams had not yet successfully returned to form as a rusher, posting just 513 rushing yards and four rushing touchdowns on an average of 3.7 yards per carry as the Broncos' primary running back. Nonetheless, he did produce his best season as a receiving back and blocker, with a career-high 346 receiving yards and 52 receptions.

=== Dallas Cowboys ===
==== 2025 ====
On March 10, 2025, Williams signed a one-year, $3.5 million contract with the Dallas Cowboys.

In Week 1 of the 2025 season against the Philadelphia Eagles, he scored the first two touchdowns of the regular season for the Cowboys in a 24–20 loss. In Week 2 against the New York Giants, Williams rushed for 97 yards and a touchdown in a 40–37 overtime victory. In Week 4 against the Green Bay Packers, Williams rushed for 85 yards and a touchdown in a 40–40 tie.

In Week 5 against the New York Jets, Williams rushed for 135 yards and a touchdown, and also caught a four-yard touchdown pass in a 37–22 victory. In Week 7 against the Washington Commanders, Williams rushed for 116 yards and a touchdown in a 44–22 victory. In Week 8 against his former team, the Denver Broncos, Williams rushed for 41 yards and two touchdowns in a 44–24 loss. In Week 14 against the Detroit Lions, Williams rushed for 67 yards and a touchdown in a 44–30 loss, eclipsing the 1,000-yard rushing mark for the first time in his career.

Williams was placed on injured reserve on January 3, 2026, after dealing with a shoulder injury. In 16 games, he finished the season with 1,201 rushing yards and 11 touchdowns, both career-highs.

==== 2026 ====
On February 21, 2026, Williams re-signed with the Cowboys on a three-year, $24 million contract, with $16 million guaranteed.

In Week 1 against the New York Giants, Williams rushed for 41 yards and a touchdown, and also caught five passes for 31 yards and a receiving touchdown in a 28-20 loss. In Week 3 against the Baltimore Ravens, Williams rushed for 98 yards and a touchdown in a 34-31 loss. In Week 4 against the Houston Texans, Williams rushed for 62 yards and scored three touchdowns in a 34-30 victory.

In Week 7 against the Philadelphia Eagles on Monday Night Football, Williams ran for a career-high 155 yards and a touchdown in a 38-21 victory. In Week 9 against the Indianapolis Colts, Williams carried the ball 20 times for 101 yards, and scored the game-winning touchdown in a 27-23 victory.

== Career statistics ==
Legend
**Bold**	Career high

=== NFL ===
==== Regular season ====
Year	Team	Games		Rushing					Receiving					Fumbles	
Year	Team	GP	GS	Att	Yds	Avg	Lng	TD	Rec	Yds	Avg	Lng	TD	Fum	Lost
2021	DEN	17	1	203	903	4.4	49	4	43	316	**7.3**	**42**	**3**	**2**	1
2022	DEN	4	4	47	204	4.3	17	0	16	76	4.8	13	0	1	1
2023	DEN	16	13	217	774	3.6	21	3	47	228	4.9	18	2	1	1
2024	DEN	17	11	139	513	3.7	20	4	**52**	**346**	6.7	34	0	**2**	**2**
2025	DAL	16	16	**252**	**1,201**	**4.8**	**66**	**11**	35	137	3.9	14	2	**2**	1
2026	DAL	10	10	170	692	4.1	34	9	25	131	5.2	17	1	**3**	0
Career		80	55	1,028	4,287	4.2	66	31	218	1,234	5.7	42	8	11	6

==== Postseason ====
Year	Team	Games		Rushing					Receiving					Fumbles	
Year	Team	GP	GS	Att	Yds	Avg	Lng	TD	Rec	Yds	Avg	Lng	TD	Fum	Lost
2024	DEN	1	1	7	29	4.1	6	0	2	14	7.0	7	0	0	0
Career		1	1	7	29	4.1	6	0	2	14	7.0	7	0	0	0

=== College ===
Season	Team	GP	Rushing					Receiving				
Season	Team	GP	Att	Yds	Avg	Lng	TD	Rec	Yds	Avg	Lng	TD
2018	North Carolina	11	43	224	5.2	22	5	8	58	7.3	35	0
2019	North Carolina	13	**166**	933	5.6	40	5	17	176	10.4	26	1
2020	North Carolina	11	157	**1,140**	**7.3**	**65**	**19**	**25**	**305**	**12.2**	**41**	**3**
Career		35	366	2,297	6.3	65	29	50	539	10.8	41	4
