= Justin Barron (American football) =

American football player (born 2001)

No. 45 – Dallas Cowboys
- Position: Linebacker
- Roster status: Active

Personal information
- Born: October 25, 2001 (age 25); Rocky Hill, Connecticut, U.S.
- Listed height: 6 ft 4 in (1.93 m)
- Listed weight: 235 lb (107 kg)

Career information
- High school: Suffield Academy (Suffield, Connecticut)
- College: Syracuse (2020–2024)
- NFL draft: 2025: undrafted

Career history
- Dallas Cowboys (2025–present)

Career NFL statistics as of Week 3, 2026
- Games played: 4
- Stats at Pro Football Reference

Justin Barron (born October 25, 2001) is an American professional football linebacker for the Dallas Cowboys of the National Football League (NFL). He played college football for the Syracuse Orange.

== Early life ==
Barron attended Suffield Academy in Suffield, Connecticut. As a junior he totaled 34 catches for 581 yards and four touchdowns on offense and 35 tackles with one being for a loss, six pass deflections, and two interceptions on defense.

As a senior, Barron hauled in 29 catches for 525 yards and five touchdowns and added 36 tackles and two interceptions on defense. Coming out of high school, he was rated as a three-star recruit and committed to play college football for the Syracuse Orange.

== College career ==
As a freshman in 2020 Barron played as a wide receiver where he notched four tackles. Ahead of the 2021 season, he switched his position from receiver to defensive back. In the 2021 season, Barron totaled 42 tackles with half a tackle being for a loss, and three pass deflections.

In 2022 he notched 64 tackles with five being for a loss, a sack, and a fumble recovery.

In the 2023 season opener in a win over Colgate, Barron tallied three tackles and a forced fumble. In week 6, he recorded 13 tackles and a pass deflection versus North Carolina. During the 2023 season, Barron totaled 90 tackles with five being for a loss, half a sack, seven pass deflections, an interception, and three forced fumbles for the Orange.

In week 7 of the 2024 season, he notched two tackles for a loss, a sack, a fumble recovery, and an interception in a win over NC State. For his performance on the season, Barron named the 2024 Walter Camp Connecticut Players of the Year alongside Alabama offensive lineman Tyler Booker. After the season, Barron declared for the 2025 NFL draft, while also accepting an invite to the 2025 Reese's Senior Bowl.

== Professional career ==
Pre-draft measurables
Height	Weight	Arm length	Hand span	Wingspan	40-yard dash	10-yard split	20-yard split	20-yard shuttle	Three-cone drill	Vertical jump	Broad jump
6 ft 3 5/8 in (1.92 m)	225 lb (102 kg)	31 1/8 in (0.79 m)	9 1/8 in (0.23 m)	6 ft 4 3/4 in (1.95 m)	4.68 s	1.65 s	2.67 s	4.38 s	6.98 s	34.0 in (0.86 m)	10 ft 0 in (3.05 m)
All values from Pro Day

After going unselected in the 2025 NFL draft, Barron signed with the Dallas Cowboys as an undrafted free agent. He was waived on August 26 as part of final roster cuts and re-signed to the practice squad the next day. He was promoted to the active roster on January 3, 2026. Barron appeared in the last two games playing on special teams and did not record any stats.

On August 30, 2026, Barron was waived by the Cowboys as a part of final roster cuts; he was re-signed to the practice squad the next day. He was promoted to the active roster on September 26.

== Personal life ==
Barron's father played football for the UConn Huskies. His mother Sara, played soccer at Hartwick College.
