= Brian Schottenheimer =

American football coach (born 1973)

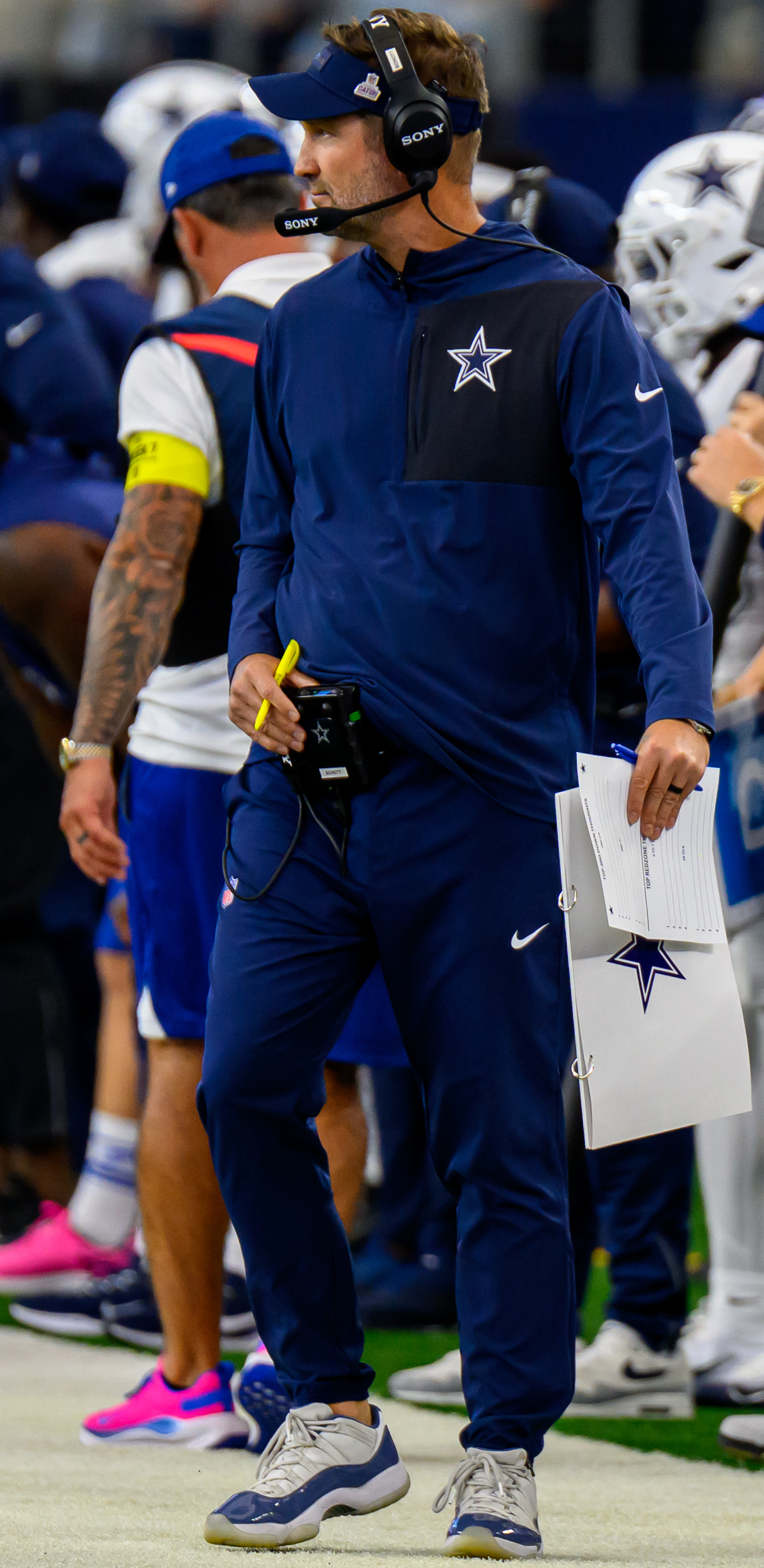
- Schottenheimer with the Dallas Cowboys in 2025

Dallas Cowboys
- Title: Head coach

Personal information
- Born: October 16, 1973 (age 53); Denver, Colorado, U.S.

Career information
- Position: Quarterback
- High school: Blue Valley (KS)
- College: Kansas (1992); Florida (1993–1996)

Career history
- St. Louis Rams (1997) Assistant; Kansas City Chiefs (1998) Assistant; Syracuse (1999) Wide receivers coach; USC (2000) Tight ends coach; Washington Redskins (2001) Quarterbacks coach; San Diego Chargers (2002–2005) Quarterbacks coach; New York Jets (2006–2011) Offensive coordinator; St. Louis Rams (2012–2014) Offensive coordinator; Georgia (2015) Offensive coordinator & quarterbacks coach; Indianapolis Colts (2016–2017) Quarterbacks coach; Seattle Seahawks (2018–2020) Offensive coordinator; Jacksonville Jaguars (2021) Passing game coordinator; Dallas Cowboys (2022–present); Coaching analyst (2022); Offensive coordinator (2023–2024); Head coach (2025–present)

Awards and highlights
- National champion (1996)

Head coaching record
- Regular season: 11–15–1 (.426)
- Coaching profile at Pro Football Reference

Brian Schottenheimer (born October 16, 1973) is an American professional football coach who is the head coach for the Dallas Cowboys of the National Football League (NFL). He previously served as the offensive coordinator for the Dallas Cowboys, Seattle Seahawks, New York Jets, St. Louis Rams and the University of Georgia and also served as an assistant coach for the Washington Redskins, San Diego Chargers, Indianapolis Colts, and Jacksonville Jaguars.

== Early life ==
Schottenheimer was born in Denver, Colorado. His father was Marty Schottenheimer. Schottenheimer prepped at Blue Valley High School in Overland Park, Kansas, where he quarterbacked his team to the Kansas Class 5A state football championship in 1991, while earning first-team all-state and honorable mention high school All-American honors.

Schottenheimer threw for 2,586 yards and 26 touchdowns in his career. His success at Blue Valley High School led to a scholarship at the University of Kansas.

== Playing career ==
=== College ===
Schottenheimer first attended the University of Kansas in Lawrence, Kansas, where he was a member of the Kansas Jayhawks football team for a single season in 1992 serving as a backup to starting quarterback Chip Hilleary.

Schottenheimer transferred to the University of Florida in Gainesville, Florida, sat out a year as required by NCAA transfer rules, and then played for coach Steve Spurrier's Florida Gators football team from 1994 to 1996.

Schottenheimer served as backup to starting quarterback Danny Wuerffel, and was a member of the Gators' 1996 Bowl Alliance national championship team. During his college playing career, he completed twenty-five of thirty-eight passes (65.8%) for 290 yards and two touchdowns, and also ran for a touchdown.

Schottenheimer graduated from Florida with a bachelor's degree in exercise and sports science in 1997.

== Coaching career ==
=== Early career ===
Schottenheimer was an assistant coach from 1997 to 2005 with the St. Louis Rams, Kansas City Chiefs, Syracuse Orange, and USC Trojans, including as quarterback coach for the Washington Redskins and San Diego Chargers. During that time, he coached under his father, Marty, with the Chiefs, Redskins, and Chargers.

=== New York Jets ===
In 2006, Schottenheimer became the offensive coordinator for the New York Jets. The team made the playoffs, the offense improved from the previous season and quarterback Chad Pennington was named NFL Comeback Player of the Year.

In 2007, Schottenheimer's name was floated around as being a possible replacement for the departed Nick Saban as the Miami Dolphins head coach. He later removed his name from consideration for the Dolphins head coaching position, preferring to stay in New York. The Jets went 4–12 and failed to make the playoffs.

In 2008, the offense scored 405 points, just the third time in franchise history reaching the 400-point mark. Led by quarterback Brett Favre and Pro Bowl running back Thomas Jones, the team registered 42 offensive touchdowns (their most in a decade). Jones would also lead the AFC with 1,312 rushing yards and break the Jets single-season record with 13 rushing touchdowns. The Jets experienced a late season collapse and missed the playoffs despite an 8–3 start.

In 2009, after Eric Mangini was fired, Schottenheimer was one of the first candidates interviewed for the open head coaching position. However, he eventually lost out to Baltimore Ravens defensive coordinator Rex Ryan. Ryan kept Schottenheimer on staff. The Jets reached the AFC Championship Game with rookie quarterback Mark Sanchez.

On January 13, 2010, Schottenheimer announced that he was staying with the Jets as offensive coordinator and would not interview for the head coaching vacancy with the Buffalo Bills. The team finished with an 11–5 record and advanced to the AFC Championship Game for the second consecutive season.

In 2011, the Jets scored only 50 points in the last three games (all losses), while finishing with an 8–8 record and the 29th rank in total offense. On January 6, 2012, he was interviewed for the Jacksonville Jaguars head coaching position. Four days later, the Jets parted ways with Schottenheimer.

=== St. Louis Rams ===
On January 21, 2012, Schottenheimer was named the offensive coordinator of the St. Louis Rams under new head coach Jeff Fisher. The offense ranked 25th at the end of the season.

In 2013, starting quarterback Sam Bradford tore his left ACL on a run out of bounds after a hit from safety Mike Mitchell in the Week 7 game against the Carolina Panthers. Kellen Clemens was named the starter for the last 9 games and the offense was ranked 21st.

In 2014, Bradford suffered an injury to the same ACL after being sacked in the third preseason game against the Cleveland Browns and missed the entire season. Shaun Hill and Austin Davis were the starters at quarterback at different points during the season. The team finished ranked 28th in total offense (314.7 yards per game) and 21st in scoring (20.3 points per game).

=== Georgia Bulldogs ===
On January 7, 2015, Schottenheimer was named the offensive coordinator and quarterbacks coach for the University of Georgia under head coach Mark Richt, replacing Mike Bobo who accepted the head coach position at Colorado State University. His starter at quarterback was Virginia transfer Greyson Lambert. He lost starting running back Nick Chubb to a season-ending knee injury in the sixth game against the University of Tennessee.

The offense averaged 26.3 points per game (15 points less than in 2014), helping the team achieve a 10–3 record. Following Richt's firing at the end of the season, Schottenheimer announced on December 14 to his position players that he would not return, as he was not retained by new head coach Kirby Smart.

=== Indianapolis Colts ===
On January 18, 2016, the Indianapolis Colts announced the hiring of Schottenheimer as their quarterbacks coach, replacing Clyde Christensen who left to become the offensive coordinator for the Miami Dolphins. He contributed to Andrew Luck having arguably the best-overall performance of his career, establishing a single-season career-high in completion percentage (63.5) and being ranked among the top 10 in the league in passing yards (4,240, eighth), passing touchdowns (31, fifth) and quarterback rating (96.4, ninth).

In 2017, Luck was forced to miss the season while recovering from an offseason right shoulder surgery. Scott Tolzien started the season-opener, before making way for Jacoby Brissett, who took over as the starter in Week 2 after being acquired in a trade. Helping Brisset learn the playbook week by week, Schottenheimer contributed to a production of 3,098 passing yards, 13 passing touchdowns, seven interceptions, 63 carries for 260 yards and 4 rushing scores in 16 games (15 starts).

=== Seattle Seahawks ===
On January 15, 2018, the Seattle Seahawks named Schottenheimer as their offensive coordinator. The Seahawks went on to have the league's top rushing offense for the 2018 season and quarterback Russell Wilson had a career high 110.9 passer rating.

In 2019, Wilson threw for over 4,000 yards for the third time in his career, passed for 32 touchdowns (3rd in NFL), set a career-low with five interceptions and was named the NFC starter for the 2020 Pro Bowl. Chris Carson rushed for a career-high 1,230 yards, while the offense ranked in the top 10 in the NFL in rushing yards per game (137.5, fourth), total yards per game (374.4, eighth), points per game (25.3, ninth).

In 2020, the offense set a franchise record for most points scored (459 points). Despite a torrid start to the season which saw career highs for quarterback Russell Wilson in touchdowns and completion percentage, Seattle's offense struggled considerably during the final weeks, with Schottenheimer taking the brunt of the scrutiny due to lack of creativity in the offense and adjustments to the scheme. On January 12, 2021, Schottenheimer was fired by the Seahawks following the Seahawks' Wild Card loss to the Los Angeles Rams due to "philosophical differences".

Three players made an All-Pro team during his tenure, quarterback Russell Wilson, offensive tackle Duane Brown and wide receiver DK Metcalf.

=== Jacksonville Jaguars ===
On February 1, 2021, Schottenheimer was hired by the Jacksonville Jaguars as their passing game coordinator under head coach Urban Meyer. He was in charge of calling the offensive plays for the final four games of the season after Meyer was fired.

On February 8, 2022, upon the Jaguars hiring of Doug Pederson as the new head coach, Schottenheimer was not retained on the coaching staff.

=== Dallas Cowboys ===
On March 24, 2022, Schottenheimer was hired by the Dallas Cowboys as a consultant. He worked mostly with defensive coordinator Dan Quinn, providing analysis of opposing teams' offenses.

On February 4, 2023, after Kellen Moore left to join the Los Angeles Chargers staff, Schottenheimer was promoted to offensive coordinator, with head coach Mike McCarthy taking over the play-calling responsibility. The team scored 30 or more points in seven of their final 11 games, while finishing with the highest-ranking scoring offense in the league (29.9 points per game) and fifth in yards (371.6 yards per game).

In 2024, the offense regressed, averaging 327.5 yards, 20.6 points, and scoring 30 or more points in just three games. Part of the issue was the season-ending injury to starting quarterback Dak Prescott.

On January 24, 2025, a couple of weeks after McCarthy and the Cowboys decided not to renew McCarthy's contract, Schottenheimer was promoted to head coach. Schottenheimer's decision came as a surprise, as he was not known to be in consideration over more qualified candidates, until he became a betting favorite to be the team's next head coach on January 20, and after it was confirmed that his first official interview took place on January 21. It was reported in the media that one of Schottenheimer's supporters was Prescott.

In his first season as Cowboys' head coach, Schottenheimer finished with a 7–9–1 record and missed the postseason.

== Head coaching record ==
Team	Year	Regular season					Postseason			
Team	Year	Won	Lost	Ties	Win %	Finish	Won	Lost	Win %	Result
DAL	2025	7	9	1	.441	2nd in NFC East	—	—	—	—
DAL	2026	4	6	0	.400	TBD in NFC East				
Total		11	15	1	.426					

== Personal life ==
Schottenheimer is the son of Marty Schottenheimer, who had been the head coach of the Cleveland Browns, Washington Redskins, San Diego Chargers, and Kansas City Chiefs. His uncle, Kurt Schottenheimer, was also the defensive backs coach and defensive coordinator for the Chiefs. In addition to coaching, Schottenheimer is a frequent contributor to The 33rd Team, which describes itself as a "football Think Tank."

In August 2025, Schottenheimer revealed that he had been diagnosed with thyroid cancer in 2002, at the age of 28, while serving as the Quarterbacks coach for the Chargers. Schottenheimer underwent surgery to remove his thyroid and 17 lymph nodes following a referral from Dan Snyder, and has since fully recovered.
