= 2024 Dallas Cowboys season =

65th season in franchise history

- Owner: Jerry Jones
- General manager: Jerry Jones
- Head coach: Mike McCarthy
- Home stadium: AT&T Stadium

Results
- Record: 7–10
- Division place: 3rd NFC East
- Playoffs: Did not qualify
- All-Pros: KR KaVontae Turpin (1st team); WR CeeDee Lamb (2nd team); K Brandon Aubrey (2nd team)
- Pro Bowlers: WR CeeDee Lamb; G Tyler Smith; DE Micah Parsons; K Brandon Aubrey; RS KaVontae Turpin

Uniform
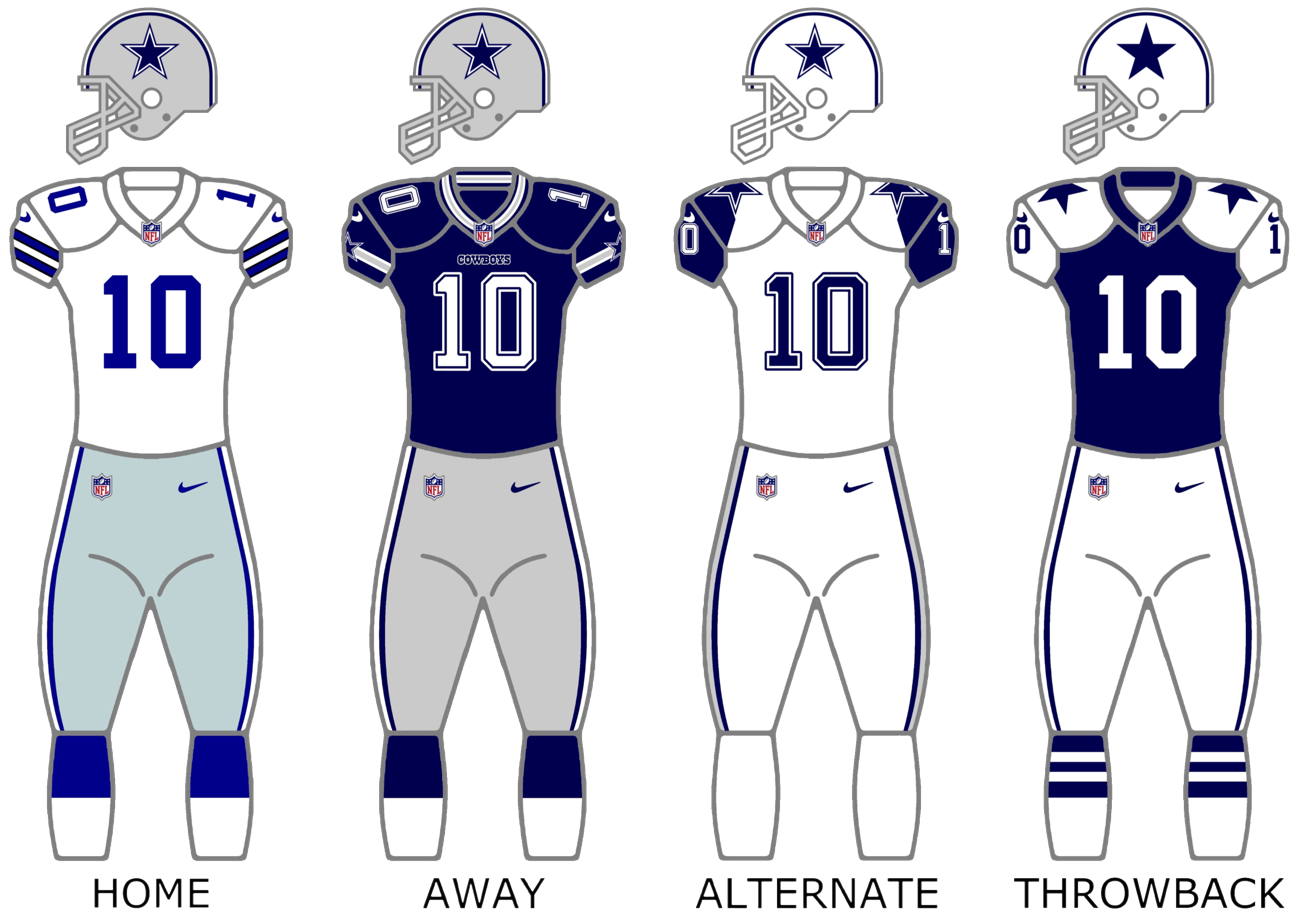

The 2024 season was the Dallas Cowboys' 65th in the National Football League (NFL) and their fifth and final season under head coach Mike McCarthy. This was their first season since 2020 without Dan Quinn as defensive coordinator, as the Washington Commanders hired him to be their head coach. He was replaced in that role by former Minnesota Vikings head coach Mike Zimmer, who returned to the Cowboys after eighteen years. The Cowboys failed to improve upon their 12–5 record from the past three seasons following a loss to the Atlanta Falcons in Week 9, and failed to match it after a loss to the Philadelphia Eagles in Week 10. After the Eagles defeated the Carolina Panthers in Week 14, the Cowboys were knocked out of NFC East contention, marking the 20th straight season the division would not have a repeat champion. With the Commanders' 36–33 win over the Eagles in Week 16, the Cowboys were eliminated from playoff contention for the first time since 2020. After their 41–7 loss at Philadelphia in Week 17, the Cowboys suffered a losing season for the first time since that same year, and were also swept by the Eagles for the first time since 2011.

For the first time since 2010, offensive tackle Tyron Smith was not on the roster, as he signed with the New York Jets during free agency. On April 29, running back Ezekiel Elliott signed a one-year contract to return to the team after a year away.

The Cowboys notably struggled at home, going 2–7 at home. Conversely, they performed moderately well on the road with a 5–3 road record. The 2–7 home record notably came after a year in which the Cowboys went undefeated at home in the regular season at 8–0.

After the season, head coach Mike McCarthy's contract expired. It was announced McCarthy would not return to the Cowboys, as the two sides failed to reach an extension, ending McCarthy's tenure in Dallas. Offensive coordinator Brian Schottenheimer was promoted to head coach on January 24, 2025.

== Offseason ==
=== Signings ===
Position	Player	Age	2023 team	Contract
RB	Ezekiel Elliott	29	New England Patriots	1 year, $3 million
RB	Royce Freeman	28	Los Angeles Rams	1 year, $1.25 million
LB	Eric Kendricks	32	Los Angeles Chargers	1 year, $3 million

=== Re-signings ===
Position	Player	Age	Contract
RB	Rico Dowdle	25	1 year, $1.25 million
G	Chuma Edoga	27	1 year, $1.3 million
CB	C. J. Goodwin	34	1 year, $3.7 million
CB	Jourdan Lewis	29	1 year, $2.8 million
LS	Trent Sieg	29	1 year, $1.3 million

=== Trade acquisitions ===
Position	Player	Age	2023 team	Contract	Traded away
CB	Andrew Booth Jr.	24	Minnesota Vikings	2 years, $3.3 million	CB Nahshon Wright

=== Departures ===
Position	Player	Age	2024 team
RB	Tony Pollard	27	Tennessee Titans
WR	Michael Gallup	28	Retired
TE	Sean McKeon	27	Detroit Lions
OT	Tyron Smith	34	New York Jets
C	Tyler Biadasz	27	Washington Commanders
DE	Dorance Armstrong	27	Washington Commanders
DE	Dante Fowler	30	Washington Commanders
DT	Neville Gallimore	27	Miami Dolphins
DT	Johnathan Hankins	32	Seattle Seahawks
LB	Leighton Vander Esch	28	Retired
CB	Stephon Gilmore	34	Minnesota Vikings
CB	Noah Igbinoghene	25	Washington Commanders
CB	Nahshon Wright	26	Minnesota Vikings
SS	Jayron Kearse	30	Unsigned

== Draft ==
2024 Dallas Cowboys draft selections
Round	Selection	Player	Position	College	Notes
1	24	Traded to the Detroit Lions (Note: The Cowboys traded a first-round selection (24th overall) and a 2025 seventh-round selection to the Detroit Lions in exchange for first- and third-round selections (29th and 73rd overall).)			
1	29	Tyler Guyton	OT	Oklahoma	From Lions
2	56	Marshawn Kneeland	DE	Western Michigan	
3	73	Cooper Beebe	G	Kansas State	From Vikings via Lions
3	87	Marist Liufau	LB	Notre Dame	
4	124	Traded to the San Francisco 49ers (Note: The Cowboys traded a fourth-round selection (124th overall) to the San Francisco 49ers in exchange for QB Trey Lance.)			
5	159	Traded to the Kansas City Chiefs (Note: The Cowboys traded a fifth-round selection (159th overall) to the Kansas City Chiefs in exchange for a 2023 sixth-round selection (178th overall).)			
5	174	Caelen Carson	CB	Wake Forest	
6	200	Traded to the Houston Texans (Note: The Cowboys traded a sixth-round selection (200th overall) and a 2023 fifth-round selection to the Houston Texans in exchange for WR Brandin Cooks.)			
6	216	Ryan Flournoy	WR	Southeast Missouri State	
7	233	Nate Thomas	OT	Louisiana	From Raiders (Note: The Cowboys traded a 2023 sixth-round selection to the Las Vegas Raiders in exchange for a seventh-round selection (233rd overall) and DT Johnathan Hankins.)
7	244	Justin Rogers	DT	Auburn	

2024 Dallas Cowboys undrafted free agents
Name	Position	College	Ref.
Corey Crooms	WR	Minnesota	
Denzel Daxon	DT	Illinois	
Josh DeBerry	CB	Texas A&M	
Alec Holler	TE	UCF	
Cam Johnson	WR	Northwestern	
Emany Johnson	S	Nevada	
Jason Johnson	LB	UCF	
Brock Mogensen	LB	South Dakota	
Nathaniel Peat	RB	Missouri	
Brevyn Spann-Ford	TE	Minnesota	
Byron Vaughns	DE	Baylor	
Julius Wood	S	East Carolina	

Draft trades

== Staff ==
2024 Dallas Cowboys staff
Front office: Owner/president/general manager – Jerry Jones; COO/executive vice president/director of player personnel – Stephen Jones; Senior director of football operations/football administration – Todd Williams; Executive vice president/chief brand officer – Charlotte Jones Anderson; Executive vice president/chief of sales – Jerry Jones Jr.; Director of salary cap & player contracts – Adam Prasifka; Vice president player personnel – Will McClay; Director of football administration and technology – Jason McKay; Head coaches: Head coach – Mike McCarthy; Assistant head coach/defensive backs – Al Harris; Offensive coaches: Offensive coordinator – Brian Schottenheimer; Quarterbacks – Scott Tolzien; Assistant quarterbacks/game management – Ryan Feder; Run game coordinator/running backs – Jeff Blasko; Pass game coordinator/wide receivers – Robert Prince; Tight ends – Lunda Wells; Offensive line – Mike Solari; Assistant offensive line/quality control – Ramon Chinyoung; Offensive assistant/minority fellowship – Evan Harrington; Pass game specialist – Chase Haslett; Offensive assistant/quality control – Steve Shimko	Defensive coaches: Defensive coordinator – Mike Zimmer; Defensive line – Jeff Zgonina; Assistant defensive line/quality control – Greg Ellis; Linebackers – Scott McCurley; Quality control/assistant linebackers – Darian Thompson; Safeties – Cannon Matthews; Assistant defensive backs/quality control – Cristian Garcia; Defensive run game coordinator – Paul Guenther; Special teams coaches: Special teams coordinator – John Fassel; Assistant special teams – Rayna Stewart; Coaching operations manager/football analytics – Justin Rudd; Quality control/head coach assistant – Eric Simonelli; Strength and conditioning: Strength and conditioning – Harold Nash; Assistant strength and conditioning – Cedric Smith; Assistant strength and conditioning – Kendall Smith

== Final roster ==
2024 Dallas Cowboys roster
Quarterbacks (QB): 14 Will Grier; 19 Trey Lance; 10 Cooper Rush; Running backs (RB): 23 Rico Dowdle; 40 Hunter Luepke; 42 Deuce Vaughn; Wide receivers (WR): 83 Jalen Brooks; 3 Brandin Cooks; 80 Ryan Flournoy; 81 Jonathan Mingo; 1 Jalen Tolbert; 9 KaVontae Turpin; Tight ends (TE): 85 Princeton Fant; 87 Jake Ferguson; 86 Luke Schoonmaker; 89 Brevyn Spann-Ford	Offensive linemen (OL): 66 T. J. Bass G; 56 Cooper Beebe C; 71 Chuma Edoga T; 60 Tyler Guyton T; 67 Brock Hoffman G/C; 76 Asim Richards T; 73 Tyler Smith G; 78 Terence Steele T; 79 Matt Waletzko T; Defensive linemen (DL): 51 Earnest Brown IV DE; 99 Chauncey Golston DE; 93 Linval Joseph DT; 94 Marshawn Kneeland DE; 55 Carl Lawson DE; 97 Osa Odighizuwa DT; 11 Micah Parsons DE; 96 Justin Rogers DT; 58 Mazi Smith DT; 92 Carlos Watkins DT; 91 Tyrus Wheat DE	Linebackers (LB): 18 Damone Clark MLB/OLB; 47 Darius Harris OLB; 57 Buddy Johnson MLB; 50 Eric Kendricks MLB; 35 Marist Liufau OLB; 41 Nick Vigil MLB; Defensive backs (DB): 26 DaRon Bland CB; 25 Andrew Booth Jr. CB; 29 C. J. Goodwin CB; 28 Malik Hooker FS; 2 Jourdan Lewis CB; 24 Israel Mukuamu SS; 30 Juanyeh Thomas FS; 6 Donovan Wilson SS; Special teams (ST): 5 Bryan Anger P; 17 Brandon Aubrey K; 44 Trent Sieg LS	Practice squad: 61 Jack Anderson G; 38 Luq Barcoo CB; 20 Dalvin Cook RB; 72 Jalen Dalton DT; 34 Malik Davis RB; 95 Denzel Daxon DT (IPP); 37 Dee Delaney FS; 84 Kelvin Harmon WR; 59 Brock Mogensen MLB; 16 Jalen Moreno-Cropper WR; 32 Troy Pride CB; 65 Dakoda Shepley T; 53 Luiji Vilain DE; 13 Seth Williams WR; Reserve: 14 Markquese Bell SS (IR); 64 Earl Bostick Jr. T (IR); 31 Josh Butler CB (IR); 21 Caelen Carson CB (IR); 7 Trevon Diggs CB (IR); 43 Kemon Hall CB (IR); 88 CeeDee Lamb WR (IR); 90 DeMarcus Lawrence DE (IR); 70 Zack Martin G (IR); 27 Amani Oruwariye CB (IR); 13 DeMarvion Overshown OLB (IR); 4 Dak Prescott QB (IR); 81 John Stephens Jr. TE (IR); 62 Nate Thomas T (IR); 54 Sam Williams DE (IR); Rookies in italics 53 active, 15 reserve, 13 practice squad (1 exempt)

== Preseason ==
Week	Date	Opponent	Result	Record	Venue	Recap
1	August 11	at Los Angeles Rams	L 12–13	0–1	SoFi Stadium	Recap
2	August 17	at Las Vegas Raiders	W 27–12	1–1	Allegiant Stadium	Recap
3	August 24	Los Angeles Chargers	L 19–26	1–2	AT&T Stadium	Recap

== Regular season ==
=== Schedule ===
Week	Date	Opponent	Result	Record	Venue	Recap
1	September 8	at Cleveland Browns	**W** 33–17	1–0	Huntington Bank Field	Recap
2	September 15	New Orleans Saints	**L** 19–44	1–1	AT&T Stadium	Recap
3	September 22	Baltimore Ravens	**L** 25–28	1–2	AT&T Stadium	Recap
4	September 26	at **New York Giants**	**W** 20–15	2–2	MetLife Stadium	Recap
5	October 6	at Pittsburgh Steelers	**W** 20–17	3–2	Acrisure Stadium	Recap
6	October 13	Detroit Lions	**L** 9–47	3–3	AT&T Stadium	Recap
7	Bye					
8	October 27	at San Francisco 49ers	**L** 24–30	3–4	Levi's Stadium	Recap
9	November 3	at Atlanta Falcons	**L** 21–27	3–5	Mercedes-Benz Stadium	Recap
10	November 10	**Philadelphia Eagles**	**L** 6–34	3–6	AT&T Stadium	Recap
11	November 18	Houston Texans	**L** 10–34	3–7	AT&T Stadium	Recap
12	November 24	at **Washington Commanders**	**W** 34–26	4–7	Northwest Stadium	Recap
13	November 28	**New York Giants**	**W** 27–20	5–7	AT&T Stadium	Recap
14	December 9	Cincinnati Bengals	**L** 20–27	5–8	AT&T Stadium	Recap
15	December 15	at Carolina Panthers	**W** 30–14	6–8	Bank of America Stadium	Recap
16	December 22	Tampa Bay Buccaneers	**W** 26–24	7–8	AT&T Stadium	Recap
17	December 29	at **Philadelphia Eagles**	**L** 7–41	7–9	Lincoln Financial Field	Recap
18	January 5	**Washington Commanders**	**L** 19–23	7–10	AT&T Stadium	Recap

Note: Intra-division opponents are in bold text.

=== Game summaries ===
==== Week 1: at Cleveland Browns ====
Week 1: Dallas Cowboys at Cleveland Browns – Game summary

Quarter	1	2	3	4	Total
**Cowboys**	7	13	10	3	**33**
Browns	3	0	7	7	**17**

at Huntington Bank Field, Cleveland, Ohio

- Date: September 8
- Game time: 4:25 p.m. EDT/3:25 p.m. CDT
- Game weather: Sunny, 68 °F (20 °C)
- Game attendance: 67,431
- Referee: Clete Blakeman
- TV announcers (Fox): Kevin Burkhardt, Tom Brady, Erin Andrews and Tom Rinaldi
- Recap, Game Book

Game information

**First quarter**

- CLE – Dustin Hopkins 51-yard field goal, 9:23. Browns 3–0. **Drive: 6 plays, 13 yards, 3:16.**
- DAL – Brandin Cooks 21-yard pass from Dak Prescott, 6:55. Cowboys 7–3. **Drive: 6 plays, 70 yards, 2:28.**

**Second quarter**

- DAL – Ezekiel Elliott 3-yard run (Brandon Aubrey kick), 5:15. Cowboys 14–3. **Drive: 11 plays, 78 yards, 5:56.**
- DAL – Brandon Aubrey 57-yard field goal, 2:06. Cowboys 17–3. **Drive: 5 plays, 17 yards, 2:28.**
- DAL – Brandon Aubrey 40-yard field goal, 0:51. Cowboys 20–3. **Drive: 4 plays, 1 yard, 0:55.**

**Third quarter**

- DAL – KaVontae Turpin 60-yard punt return (Brandon Aubrey kick), 12:59. Cowboys 27–3. **Drive: 3 plays, −14 yards, 2:01.**
- CLE – Jerry Jeudy 6-yard pass from Deshaun Watson (Dustin Hopkins kick), 8:42. Cowboys 27–10. **Drive: 12 plays, 75 yards, 4:17.**
- DAL – Brandon Aubrey 50-yard field goal, 1:27. Cowboys 30–10. **Drive: 6 plays, 14 yards, 2:28.**

**Fourth quarter**

- DAL – Brandon Aubrey 46-yard field goal, 11:51. Cowboys 33–10. **Drive: 6 plays, 10 yards, 2:16.**
- CLE – Jerome Ford 2-yard run (Dustin Hopkins kick), 0:29. Cowboys 33–17. **Drive: 15 plays, 64 yards, 6:53.**

**Top passers**

- DAL – Dak Prescott – 19/32, 179 yards, TD
- CLE – Deshaun Watson – 24/45, 169 yard, TD, 2 INT

**Top rushers**

- DAL – Ezekiel Elliott – 10 rushes, 40 yards, TD
- CLE – Jerome Ford – 12 rushes, 44 yards, TD

**Top receivers**

- DAL – CeeDee Lamb – 5 receptions, 61 yards
- CLE – David Njoku – 4 receptions, 44 yards

With the win, the Cowboys started 1–0 for the second consecutive year.

==== Week 2: vs. New Orleans Saints ====
Week 2: New Orleans Saints at Dallas Cowboys – Game summary

Quarter	1	2	3	4	Total
**Saints**	14	21	6	3	**44**
Cowboys	3	13	3	0	**19**

at AT&T Stadium, Arlington, Texas

- Date: September 15
- Game time: 12:00 p.m. CDT
- Game weather: None (retractable roof closed)
- Game attendance: 93,691
- Referee: Shawn Smith
- TV announcers (Fox): Kevin Burkhardt, Tom Brady, Erin Andrews and Tom Rinaldi
- Recap, Game Book

Game information

**First quarter**

- NO – Alvin Kamara 5-yard run (Blake Grupe kick), 10:50. Saints 7–0. **Drive: 7 plays, 80 yards, 4:10.**
- DAL – Brandon Aubrey 52-yard field goal, 4:14. Saints 7–3. **Drive: 13 plays, 45 yards, 6:36.**
- NO – Rashid Shaheed 70-yard pass from Derek Carr (Blake Grupe kick), 4:05. Saints 14–3. **Drive: 1 play, 70 yards, 0:09.**

**Second quarter**

- DAL – Brandon Aubrey 38-yard field goal, 11:39. Saints 14–6. **Drive: 14 plays, 41 yards, 7:26.**
- NO – Alvin Kamara 57-yard pass from Derek Carr (Blake Grupe kick), 9:30. Saints 21–6. **Drive: 4 plays, 70 yards, 2:09.**
- DAL – CeeDee Lamb 65-yard pass from Dak Prescott (Brandon Aubrey kick), 7:43. Saints 21–13. **Drive: 4 plays, 78 yards, 1:47.**
- NO – Alvin Kamara 12-yard run (Blake Grupe kick), 2:48. Saints 28–13. **Drive: 11 plays, 70 yards, 4:55.**
- NO – Derek Carr 1-yard run (Blake Grupe kick), 0:39. Saints 35–13. **Drive: 3 plays, 20 yards, 0:23.**
- DAL – Brandon Aubrey 48-yard field goal, 0:00. Saints 35–16. **Drive: 7 plays, 40 yards, 0:39.**

**Third quarter**

- DAL – Brandon Aubrey 40-yard field goal, 9:05. Saints 35–19. **Drive: 10 plays, 51 yards, 5:55.**
- NO – Alvin Kamara 7-yard run (kick blocked), 1:09. Saints 41–19. **Drive: 13 plays, 70 yards, 7:56.**

**Fourth quarter**

- NO – Blake Grupe 26-yard field goal, 5:11. Saints 44–19. **Drive: 4 plays, 5 yards, 2:38.**

**Top passers**

- NO – Derek Carr – 11/16, 243 yards, 2 TD, INT
- DAL – Dak Prescott – 27/39, 293 yards, TD, 2 INT

**Top rushers**

- NO – Alvin Kamara – 20 rushes, 115 yards, 3 TD
- DAL – Rico Dowdle – 7 rushes, 30 yards

**Top receivers**

- NO – Rashid Shaheed – 4 receptions, 96 yards, TD
- DAL – CeeDee Lamb – 4 receptions, 90 yards, TD

With the loss, the Cowboys fell to 1–1, and this was their first home loss to the Saints since 2012.

==== Week 3: vs. Baltimore Ravens ====
Week 3: Baltimore Ravens at Dallas Cowboys – Game summary

Quarter	1	2	3	4	Total
**Ravens**	14	7	7	0	**28**
Cowboys	3	3	0	19	**25**

at AT&T Stadium, Arlington, Texas

- Date: September 22
- Game time: 3:25 p.m. CDT
- Game weather: None (retractable roof closed)
- Game attendance: 93,566
- Referee: Ronald Torbert
- TV announcers (Fox): Kevin Burkhardt, Tom Brady, Erin Andrews and Tom Rinaldi
- Recap, Game Book

Game information

**First quarter**

- BAL – Lamar Jackson 9-yard run (Justin Tucker kick), 9:36. Ravens 7–0. **Drive: 5 plays, 71 yards, 2:27.**
- DAL – Brandon Aubrey 65-yard field goal, 6:33. Ravens 7–3. **Drive: 7 plays, 24 yards, 3:03.**
- BAL – Derrick Henry 1-yard run (Justin Tucker kick), 2:41. Ravens 14–3. **Drive: 7 plays, 70 yards, 3:52.**

**Second quarter**

- BAL – Rashod Bateman 13-yard pass from Lamar Jackson (Justin Tucker kick), 0:25. Ravens 21–3. **Drive: 8 plays, 88 yards, 2:42.**
- DAL – Brandon Aubrey 51-yard field goal, 0:02. Ravens 21–6. **Drive: 3 plays, 37 yards, 0:23.**

**Third quarter**

- BAL – Derrick Henry 26-yard run (Justin Tucker kick), 11:58. Ravens 28–6. **Drive: 5 plays, 70 yards, 3:02.**

**Fourth quarter**

- DAL – Dak Prescott 1-yard run (pass failed), 8:53. Ravens 28–12. **Drive: 6 plays, 64 yards, 1:48.**
- DAL – Jalen Tolbert 15-yard pass from Dak Prescott (pass failed), 7:07. Ravens 28–18. **Drive: 7 plays, 56 yards, 1:46.**
- DAL – KaVontae Turpin 16-yard pass from Dak Prescott (Brandon Aubrey kick), 2:53. Ravens 28–25. **Drive: 11 plays, 91 yards, 2:33.**

**Top passers**

- BAL – Lamar Jackson – 12/15, 182 yards, TD
- DAL – Dak Prescott – 28/51, 379 yards, 2 TD

**Top rushers**

- BAL – Derrick Henry – 25 rushes, 151 yards, 2 TD
- DAL – Rico Dowdle – 8 rushes, 32 yards

**Top receivers**

- BAL – Nelson Agholor – 1 reception, 56 yards
- DAL – Jake Ferguson – 6 receptions, 95 yards

Despite a late comeback, the Cowboys were outclassed by the Ravens, as the Cowboys trailed the entire game, and at some point fell behind 28–6. Following a Ravens missed field goal, the Cowboys were able to score a touchdown to cut the score to 28–12. The Cowboys then proceeded to recover an onside kick and score another touchdown to cut down the lead to 28–18. Despite the subsequent onside kick attempt being unsuccessful, the Cowboys defense forced a stop and got the ball back with over five and a half minutes remaining, and the Cowboys were able to score another touchdown to cut the lead down to 28–25. However, the Cowboys were unable to get a defensive stop and proceeded to lose by that score. This was the first time since 2010 the Cowboys started 0–2 at home.

==== Week 4: at New York Giants ====
Week 4: Dallas Cowboys at New York Giants – Game summary

Quarter	1	2	3	4	Total
**Cowboys**	7	7	3	3	**20**
Giants	3	6	3	3	**15**

at MetLife Stadium, East Rutherford, New Jersey

- Date: September 26
- Game time: 8:15 p.m. EDT/7:15 p.m. CDT
- Game weather: Overcast, 74 °F (23 °C)
- Game attendance: 80,425
- Referee: Clay Martin
- TV announcers (KDFW, WNYW): Al Michaels, Kirk Herbstreit and Kaylee Hartung
  Game available out of market on Prime Video.
- Recap, Game Book

Game information

**First quarter**

- NYG – Greg Joseph 52-yard field goal, 9:03. Giants 3–0. **Drive: 8 plays, 51 yards, 4:43.**
- DAL – Rico Dowdle 15-yard pass from Dak Prescott (Brandon Aubrey kick), 2:06. Cowboys 7–3. **Drive: 12 plays, 75 yards, 6:57.**

**Second quarter**

- NYG – Greg Joseph 41-yard field goal, 11:11. Cowboys 7–6. **Drive: 11 plays, 55 yards, 5:55.**
- DAL – CeeDee Lamb 55-yard pass from Dak Prescott (Brandon Aubrey kick), 9:16. Cowboys 14–6. **Drive: 5 plays, 70 yards, 1:55.**
- NYG – Greg Joseph 38-yard field goal, 1:06. Cowboys 14–9. **Drive: 15 plays, 52 yards, 8:10.**

**Third quarter**

- NYG – Greg Joseph 22-yard field goal, 8:42. Cowboys 14–12. **Drive: 11 plays, 77 yards, 6:18.**
- DAL – Brandon Aubrey 60-yard field goal, 5:06. Cowboys 17–12. **Drive: 8 plays, 28 yards, 3:36.**

**Fourth quarter**

- NYG – Greg Joseph 42-yard field goal, 11:11. Cowboys 17–15. **Drive: 10 plays, 28 yards, 4:20.**
- DAL – Brandon Aubrey 40-yard field goal, 6:54. Cowboys 20–15. **Drive: 10 plays, 48 yards, 4:17.**

**Top passers**

- DAL – Dak Prescott – 22/27, 221 yards, 2 TD
- NYG – Daniel Jones – 29/40, 281 yards, INT

**Top rushers**

- DAL – Rico Dowdle – 11 rushes, 46 yards
- NYG – Devin Singletary – 14 rushes, 24 yards

**Top receivers**

- DAL – CeeDee Lamb – 7 receptions, 98 yards, TD
- NYG – Malik Nabers – 12 receptions, 115 yards

With the win, the Cowboys improved to 2–2, and Dak Prescott recorded his 13th consecutive win as a starter against the Giants.

==== Week 5: at Pittsburgh Steelers ====
Week 5: Dallas Cowboys at Pittsburgh Steelers – Game summary

Quarter	1	2	3	4	Total
**Cowboys**	3	3	0	14	**20**
Steelers	3	0	7	7	**17**

at Acrisure Stadium, Pittsburgh, Pennsylvania

- Date: October 6
- Game time: 9:45 p.m. EDT/8:45 p.m. CDT (Note: The game was initially scheduled for 7:20 p.m., but got postponed due to thunderstorms.)
- Game weather: Cloudy, 67 °F (19 °C)
- Game attendance: 67,380
- Referee: Shawn Hochuli
- TV announcers (NBC): Mike Tirico, Cris Collinsworth and Melissa Stark
- Recap, Game Book

Game information

**First quarter**

- DAL – Brandon Aubrey 55-yard field goal, 12:35. Cowboys 3–0. **Drive: 6 plays, 21 yards, 2:25.**
- PIT – Chris Boswell 41-yard field goal, 7:33. Tied 3–3. **Drive: 11 plays, 52 yards, 5:02.**

**Second quarter**

- DAL – Brandon Aubrey 33-yard field goal, 8:51. Cowboys 6–3. **Drive: 8 plays, 51 yards, 3:29.**

**Third quarter**

- PIT – Connor Heyward 16-yard pass from Justin Fields (Chris Boswell kick), 11:50. Steelers 10–6. **Drive: 6 plays, 72 yards, 3:10.**

**Fourth quarter**

- DAL – Rico Dowdle 22-yard pass from Dak Prescott (Brandon Aubrey kick), 13:51. Cowboys 13–10. **Drive: 16 plays, 90 yards, 8:32.**
- PIT – Pat Freiermuth 6-yard pass from Justin Fields (Chris Boswell kick), 4:56. Steelers 17–13. **Drive: 12 plays, 63 yards, 5:32.**
- DAL – Jalen Tolbert 4-yard pass from Dak Prescott (Brandon Aubrey kick), 0:20. Cowboys 20–17. **Drive: 15 plays, 70 yards, 4:36.**

**Top passers**

- DAL – Dak Prescott – 29/42, 352 yards, 2 TD, 2 INT
- PIT – Justin Fields – 14/26, 138 yards, 2 TD

**Top rushers**

- DAL – Rico Dowdle – 20 rushes, 87 yards
- PIT – Najee Harris – 14 rushes, 42 yards

**Top receivers**

- DAL – Jalen Tolbert – 7 receptions, 87 yards, TD
- PIT – Najee Harris – 2 receptions, 35 yards

A thunderstorm delayed the game, pushing the original start time from 8:20 p.m. to 9:45 p.m. EDT. The game ended with a Dallas victory at 12:59 a.m. EDT, marking the longest day in NFL history since the 1970 AFL–NFL merger at 15 hours and 37 minutes (the game between the New York Jets and Minnesota Vikings had kicked off in London at 9:30 a.m. EDT). The Cowboys improved to 3–2 with the win.

==== Week 6: vs. Detroit Lions ====
Week 6: Detroit Lions at Dallas Cowboys – Game summary

Quarter	1	2	3	4	Total
**Lions**	7	20	10	10	**47**
Cowboys	3	3	3	0	**9**

at AT&T Stadium, Arlington, Texas

- Date: October 13
- Game time: 3:25 p.m. CDT
- Game weather: None (retractable roof closed)
- Game attendance: 93,644
- Referee: John Hussey
- TV announcers (Fox): Kevin Burkhardt, Tom Brady, Erin Andrews and Tom Rinaldi
- Recap, Game Book

Game information

**First quarter**

- DAL – Brandon Aubrey 34-yard field goal, 11:21. Cowboys 3–0. **Drive: 9 plays, 54 yards, 3:39.**
- DET – David Montgomery 16-yard run (Jake Bates kick), 9:06. Lions 7–3. **Drive: 5 plays, 70 yards, 2:15.**

**Second quarter**

- DET – Jake Bates 40-yard field goal, 13:28. Lions 10–3. **Drive: 12 plays, 58 yards, 6:06.**
- DET – Sam LaPorta 52-yard pass from Jared Goff (Jake Bates kick), 11:39. Lions 17–3. **Drive: 3 plays, 63 yards, 0:51.**
- DET – Jake Bates 48-yard field goal, 3:57. Lions 20–3. **Drive: 11 plays, 39 yards, 6:20.**
- DET – David Montgomery 1-yard run (Jake Bates kick), 0:36. Lions 27–3. **Drive: 6 plays, 38 yards, 2:03.**
- DAL – Brandon Aubrey 47-yard field goal, 0:08. Lions 27–6. **Drive: 4 plays, 1 yard, 0:28.**

**Third quarter**

- DET – Jameson Williams 37-yard pass from Jared Goff (Jake Bates kick), 12:35. Lions 34–6. **Drive: 5 plays, 70 yards, 2:25.**
- DAL – Brandon Aubrey 50-yard field goal, 8:48. Lions 34–9. **Drive: 10 plays, 39 yards, 3:47.**
- DET – Jake Bates 33-yard field goal, 5:26. Lions 37–9. **Drive: 6 plays, 44 yards, 3:22.**

**Fourth quarter**

- DET – Jake Bates 33-yard field goal, 14:12. Lions 40–9. **Drive: 9 plays, 57 yards, 5:12.**
- DET – Amon-Ra St. Brown 4-yard pass from Jared Goff (Jake Bates kick), 13:18. Lions 47–9. **Drive: 1 play, 4 yards, 0:04.**

**Top passers**

- DET – Jared Goff – 18/25, 315 yards, 3 TD
- DAL – Dak Prescott – 17/33, 178 yards, 2 INT

**Top rushers**

- DET – David Montgomery – 12 rushes, 80 yards, 2 TD
- DAL – Rico Dowdle – 5 rushes, 25 yards

**Top receivers**

- DET – Jameson Williams – 3 receptions, 76 yards, TD
- DAL – CeeDee Lamb – 7 receptions, 89 yards

This was the Cowboys' worst loss at AT&T Stadium in franchise history, dropping them to 3–3 (and 0–3 at home) and their first loss to Detroit since 2013.

==== Week 8: at San Francisco 49ers ====
Week 8: Dallas Cowboys at San Francisco 49ers – Game summary

Quarter	1	2	3	4	Total
Cowboys	0	10	0	14	**24**
**49ers**	3	3	21	3	**30**

at Levi's Stadium, Santa Clara, California

- Date: October 27
- Game time: 7:20 p.m. CDT/5:20 p.m. PDT
- Game weather: Cloudy, 69 °F (21 °C)
- Game attendance: 71,521
- Referee: Bill Vinovich
- TV announcers (NBC): Mike Tirico, Cris Collinsworth and Melissa Stark
- Recap, Game Book

Game information

**First quarter**

- SF – Anders Carlson 50-yard field goal, 7:14. 49ers 3–0. **Drive: 7 plays, 55 yards, 4:30.**

**Second quarter**

- DAL – Ezekiel Elliott 1-yard run (Brandon Aubrey kick), 10:58. Cowboys 7–3. **Drive: 11 plays, 65 yards, 6:35.**
- DAL – Brandon Aubrey 29-yard field goal, 2:56. Cowboys 10–3. **Drive: 8 plays, 46 yards, 3:36.**
- SF – Anders Carlson 44-yard field goal, 1:30. Cowboys 10–6. **Drive: 6 plays, 39 yards, 1:26.**

**Third quarter**

- SF – Isaac Guerendo 4-yard run (Anders Carlson kick), 12:57. 49ers 13–10. **Drive: 5 plays, 60 yards, 2:03.**
- SF – George Kittle 2-yard pass from Brock Purdy (Anders Carlson kick), 7:34. 49ers 20–10. **Drive: 7 plays, 32 yards, 4:16.**
- SF – Brock Purdy 2-yard run (Anders Carlson kick), 0:36. 49ers 27–10. **Drive: 9 plays, 75 yards, 5:33.**

**Fourth quarter**

- DAL – CeeDee Lamb 7-yard pass from Dak Prescott (Brandon Aubrey kick), 7:58. 49ers 27–17. **Drive: 10 plays, 70 yards, 3:59.**
- SF – Anders Carlson 41-yard field goal, 4:30. 49ers 30–17. **Drive: 6 plays, 47 yards, 3:33.**
- DAL – CeeDee Lamb 20-yard pass from Dak Prescott (Brandon Aubrey kick), 3:32. 49ers 30–24. **Drive: 4 plays, 70 yards, 0:53.**

**Top passers**

- DAL – Dak Prescott – 25/38, 243 yards, 2 TD, 2 INT
- SF – Brock Purdy – 18/26, 260 yards, TD

**Top rushers**

- DAL – Ezekiel Elliott – 10 rushes, 34 yards, TD
- SF – Isaac Guerendo – 14 rushes, 85 yards, TD

**Top receivers**

- DAL – CeeDee Lamb – 13 receptions, 146 yards, 2 TD
- SF – George Kittle – 6 receptions, 128 yards, TD

With the loss, the Cowboys fell to 3–4, and lost to the 49ers for the fourth straight season (including playoffs).

==== Week 9: at Atlanta Falcons ====
Week 9: Dallas Cowboys at Atlanta Falcons – Game summary

Quarter	1	2	3	4	Total
Cowboys	3	7	3	8	**21**
**Falcons**	7	7	7	6	**27**

at Mercedes-Benz Stadium, Atlanta, Georgia

- Date: November 3
- Game time: 1:00 p.m. EST/12:00 p.m. CST
- Game weather: None (retractable roof closed)
- Game attendance: 72,665
- Referee: Scott Novak
- TV announcers (Fox): Adam Amin, Greg Olsen and Pam Oliver
- Recap, Game Book

Game information

**First quarter**

- DAL – Brandon Aubrey 34-yard field goal, 9:32. Cowboys 3–0. **Drive: 7 plays, 59 yards, 3:32.**
- ATL – Drake London 9-yard pass from Kirk Cousins (Younghoe Koo kick), 5:23. Falcons 7–3. **Drive: 7 plays, 78 yards, 4:09.**

**Second quarter**

- ATL – Darnell Mooney 36-yard pass from Kirk Cousins (Younghoe Koo kick), 8:28. Falcons 14–3. **Drive: 5 plays, 53 yards, 2:50.**
- DAL – Rico Dowdle 3-yard pass from Dak Prescott (Brandon Aubrey kick), 4:01. Falcons 14–10. **Drive: 9 plays, 70 yards, 4:27.**

**Third quarter**

- ATL – Ray-Ray McCloud 11-yard pass from Kirk Cousins (Younghoe Koo kick), 10:23. Falcons 21–10. **Drive: 5 plays, 38 yards, 2:47.**
- DAL – Brandon Aubrey 57-yard field goal, 0:00. Falcons 21–13. **Drive: 9 plays, 22 yards, 4:11.**

**Fourth quarter**

- ATL – Tyler Allgeier 6-yard run (pass failed), 11:08. Falcons 27–13. **Drive: 7 plays, 66 yards, 3:52.**
- DAL – Jalen Tolbert 4-yard pass from Cooper Rush (Cooper Rush–CeeDee Lamb pass), 1:08. Falcons 27–21. **Drive: 14 plays, 86 yards, 3:28.**

**Top passers**

- DAL – Dak Prescott – 18/24, 133 yards, TD
- ATL – Kirk Cousins – 19/24, 222 yards, 3 TD

**Top rushers**

- DAL – Rico Dowdle – 12 rushes, 75 yards
- ATL – Bijan Robinson – 19 rushes, 86 yards

**Top receivers**

- DAL – Jake Ferguson – 7 receptions, 71 yards
- ATL – Darnell Mooney – 5 receptions, 88 yards, TD

During the game, quarterback Dak Prescott suffered a hamstring injury and missed the remainder of the game. Prescott would later undergo surgery for what was revealed as a partial tendon avulsion, which forced him to miss the rest of the season.

With their third straight loss (their longest losing streak since 2020), the Cowboys fell to 3–5.

==== Week 10: vs. Philadelphia Eagles ====
Week 10: Philadelphia Eagles at Dallas Cowboys – Game summary

Quarter	1	2	3	4	Total
**Eagles**	7	7	14	6	**34**
Cowboys	3	3	0	0	**6**

at AT&T Stadium, Arlington, Texas

- Date: November 10
- Game time: 3:25 p.m. CST
- Game weather: None (retractable roof closed)
- Game attendance: 93,644
- Referee: Alex Kemp
- TV announcers (CBS): Jim Nantz, Tony Romo and Tracy Wolfson
- Recap, Game Book

Game information

**First quarter**

- PHI – Jalen Hurts 1-yard run (Jake Elliott kick), 7:05. Eagles 7–0. **Drive: 4 plays, 17 yards, 1:47.**
- DAL – Brandon Aubrey 46-yard field goal, 3:10. Eagles 7–3. **Drive: 9 plays, 32 yards, 3:55.**

**Second quarter**

- DAL – Brandon Aubrey 23-yard field goal, 1:48. Eagles 7–6. **Drive: 4 plays, 1 yard, 0:20.**
- PHI – Dallas Goedert 14-yard pass from Jalen Hurts (Jake Elliott kick), 0:23. Eagles 14–6. **Drive: 7 plays, 84 yards, 1:25.**

**Third quarter**

- PHI – Johnny Wilson 5-yard pass from Jalen Hurts (Jake Elliott kick), 8:52. Eagles 21–6. **Drive: 7 plays, 37 yards, 2:50.**
- PHI – Jalen Hurts 8-yard run (Jake Elliott kick), 2:56. Eagles 28–6. **Drive: 7 plays, 83 yards, 4:17.**

**Fourth quarter**

- PHI – Jake Elliott 39-yard field goal, 14:50. Eagles 31–6. **Drive: 4 plays, 0 yards, 1:13.**
- PHI – Jake Elliott 38-yard field goal, 10:32. Eagles 34–6. **Drive: 4 plays, 9 yards, 2:10.**

**Top passers**

- PHI – Jalen Hurts – 14/20, 202 yards, 2 TD, INT
- DAL – Cooper Rush – 13/23, 45 yards

**Top rushers**

- PHI – Saquon Barkley – 14 rushes, 66 yards
- DAL – Rico Dowdle – 12 rushes, 53 yards

**Top receivers**

- PHI – A. J. Brown – 5 receptions, 109 yards
- DAL – Jake Ferguson – 4 receptions, 24 yards

This was the Cowboys' first home loss to the Eagles since 2017, and also dropped them to 3–6, and 0–4 at home for the season.

==== Week 11: vs. Houston Texans ====
Week 11: Houston Texans at Dallas Cowboys – Game summary

Quarter	1	2	3	4	Total
**Texans**	14	3	3	14	**34**
Cowboys	0	10	0	0	**10**

at AT&T Stadium, Arlington, Texas

- Date: November 18
- Game time: 7:15 p.m. CST
- Game weather: None (retractable roof closed)
- Game attendance: 92,969
- Referee: Craig Wrolstad
- TV announcers (ESPN/ABC): Joe Buck, Troy Aikman, Lisa Salters and Laura Rutledge
- Recap, Game Book

Game information

**First quarter**

- HOU – Joe Mixon 45-yard run (Kaʻimi Fairbairn kick), 12:42. Texans 7–0. **Drive: 6 plays, 77 yards, 2:18.**
- HOU – Joe Mixon 1-yard run (Kaʻimi Fairbairn kick), 0:49. Texans 14–0. **Drive: 10 plays, 63 yards, 5:00.**

**Second quarter**

- DAL – KaVontae Turpin 64-yard pass from Cooper Rush (Brandon Aubrey kick), 14:51. Texans 14–7. **Drive: 3 plays, 64 yards, 0:58.**
- HOU – Kaʻimi Fairbairn 33-yard field goal, 9:10. Texans 17–7. **Drive: 9 plays, 77 yards, 5:41.**
- DAL – Brandon Aubrey 53-yard field goal, 5:55. Texans 17–10. **Drive: 8 plays, 35 yards, 3:15.**

**Third quarter**

- HOU – Kaʻimi Fairbairn 29-yard field goal, 7:05. Texans 20–10. **Drive: 10 plays, 65 yards, 5:47.**

**Fourth quarter**

- HOU – Derek Barnett 28-yard fumble return (Kaʻimi Fairbairn kick), 12:31. Texans 27–10.
- HOU – Joe Mixon 1-yard run (Kaʻimi Fairbairn kick), 3:16. Texans 34–10. **Drive: 6 plays, 35 yards, 2:50.**

**Top passers**

- HOU – C. J. Stroud – 23/34, 257 yards, INT
- DAL – Cooper Rush – 32/55, 354 yards, TD, INT

**Top rushers**

- HOU – Joe Mixon – 20 rushes, 109 yards, 3 TD
- DAL – Rico Dowdle – 10 rushes, 28 yards

**Top receivers**

- HOU – Nico Collins – 4 receptions, 54 yards
- DAL – CeeDee Lamb – 8 receptions, 93 yards

The Cowboys set an NFL record by trailing by over 20 points in six straight home games, dating back to last season's wild-card loss to the Packers, and fell to 3–7. This was also their first-ever home loss to the Texans and their first home loss to Houston since 1988 when it was called the Houston Oilers.

==== Week 12: at Washington Commanders ====
Week 12: Dallas Cowboys at Washington Commanders – Game summary

Quarter	1	2	3	4	Total
**Cowboys**	0	3	7	24	**34**
Commanders	3	0	6	17	**26**

at Northwest Stadium, Landover, Maryland

- Date: November 24
- Game time: 1:00 p.m. EST/12:00 p.m. CST
- Game weather: Sunny, 55 °F (13 °C)
- Game attendance: 64,955
- Referee: Tra Blake
- TV announcers (Fox): Joe Davis, Greg Olsen and Pam Oliver
- Recap, Game Book

Game information

**First quarter**

- WAS – Austin Seibert 41-yard field goal, 9:01. Commanders 3–0. **Drive: 7 plays, 17 yards, 2:24.**

**Second quarter**

- DAL – Brandon Aubrey 46-yard field goal, 0:03. Tied 3–3. **Drive: 3 plays, 58 yards, 0:42.**

**Third quarter**

- WAS – Jayden Daniels 17-yard run (kick failed, wide left), 9:53. Commanders 9–3. **Drive: 10 plays, 60 yards, 5:07.**
- DAL – Jalen Tolbert 6-yard pass from Cooper Rush (Brandon Aubrey kick), 4:40. Cowboys 10–9. **Drive: 8 plays, 80 yards, 5:13.**

**Fourth quarter**

- DAL – Brandon Aubrey 48-yard field goal, 8:11. Cowboys 13–9. **Drive: 6 plays, 20 yards, 3:06.**
- DAL – Luke Schoonmaker 22-yard pass from Cooper Rush (Brandon Aubrey kick), 5:16. Cowboys 20–9. **Drive: 5 plays, 44 yards, 2:47.**
- WAS – Zach Ertz 4-yard pass from Jayden Daniels (Jayden Daniels run), 3:02. Cowboys 20–17. **Drive: 9 plays, 69 yards, 2:14.**
- DAL – KaVontae Turpin 99-yard kickoff return (Brandon Aubrey kick), 2:49. Cowboys 27–17.
- WAS – Austin Seibert 51-yard field goal, 1:40. Cowboys 27–20. **Drive: 6 plays, 37 yards, 1:09.**
- WAS – Terry McLaurin 86-yard pass from Jayden Daniels (kick failed, wide left), 0:21. Cowboys 27–26. **Drive: 1 play, 86 yards, 0:12.**
- DAL – Juanyeh Thomas 43-yard kickoff return (Brandon Aubrey kick), 0:14. Cowboys 34–26.

**Top passers**

- DAL – Cooper Rush – 24/32, 247 yards, 2 TD
- WAS – Jayden Daniels – 25/38, 275 yards, 2 TD, 2 INT

**Top rushers**

- DAL – Rico Dowdle – 19 rushes, 86 yards
- WAS – Jayden Daniels – 7 rushes, 74 yards, TD

**Top receivers**

- DAL – CeeDee Lamb – 10 receptions, 67 yards
- WAS – Terry McLaurin – 5 receptions, 102 yards, TD

Despite entering as heavy underdogs, the Cowboys shocked their division rivals, returning two kickoffs for touchdowns in the game, and snapped their five-game losing streak, improving to 4–7.

==== Week 13: vs. New York Giants ====
Thanksgiving Day games

Week 13: New York Giants at Dallas Cowboys – Game summary

Quarter	1	2	3	4	Total
Giants	7	3	0	10	**20**
**Cowboys**	3	10	14	0	**27**

at AT&T Stadium, Arlington, Texas

- Date: November 28
- Game time: 3:30 p.m. CST
- Game weather: None (retractable roof closed)
- Game attendance: 92,196
- Referee: Brad Rogers
- TV announcers (Fox): Kevin Burkhardt, Tom Brady, Erin Andrews and Tom Rinaldi
- Recap, Game Book

Game information

**First quarter**

- DAL – Brandon Aubrey 23-yard field goal, 9:43. Cowboys 3–0. **Drive: 11 plays, 65 yards, 5:17.**
- NYG – Tyrone Tracy Jr. 1-yard run (Graham Gano kick), 3:06. Giants 7–3. **Drive: 13 plays, 70 yards, 6:37.**

**Second quarter**

- DAL – Brandon Aubrey 33-yard field goal, 11:44. Giants 7–6. **Drive: 13 plays, 55 yards, 6:22.**
- DAL – DeMarvion Overshown 23-yard interception return (Brandon Aubrey kick), 11:29. Cowboys 13–7.
- NYG – Graham Gano 46-yard field goal, 3:21. Cowboys 13–10. **Drive: 4 plays, 1 yard, 1:51.**

**Third quarter**

- DAL – Brandin Cooks 2-yard pass from Cooper Rush (Brandon Aubrey kick), 11:37. Cowboys 20–10. **Drive: 6 plays, 38 yards, 2:03.**
- DAL – Rico Dowdle 4-yard run (Brandon Aubrey kick), 4:23. Cowboys 27–10. **Drive: 9 plays, 70 yards, 4:59.**

**Fourth quarter**

- NYG – Graham Gano 47-yard field goal, 13:34. Cowboys 27–13. **Drive: 10 plays, 41 yards, 5:49.**
- NYG – Drew Lock 8-yard run (Graham Gano kick), 2:18. Cowboys 27–20. **Drive: 8 plays, 80 yards, 2:21.**

**Top passers**

- NYG – Drew Lock – 21/32, 178 yards, INT
- DAL – Cooper Rush – 21/36, 195 yards, TD

**Top rushers**

- NYG – Drew Lock – 4 rushes, 57 yards, TD
- DAL – Rico Dowdle – 22 rushes, 112 yards, TD

**Top receivers**

- NYG – Malik Nabers – 8 receptions, 69 yards
- DAL – KaVontae Turpin – 4 receptions, 53 yards

With the win, the Cowboys improved to 5–7 and won at home for the first time this season. They also swept the Giants for the fourth consecutive season.

==== Week 14: vs. Cincinnati Bengals ====
Week 14: Cincinnati Bengals at Dallas Cowboys – Game Summary

Quarter	1	2	3	4	Total
**Bengals**	7	10	0	10	**27**
Cowboys	7	3	7	3	**20**

at AT&T Stadium, Arlington, Texas

- Date: December 9
- Game time: 7:15 p.m. CST
- Game weather: Clear, 59 °F (15 °C) (retractable roof open)
- Game attendance: 92,587
- Referee: Scott Novak
- TV announcers (ESPN/ABC): Joe Buck, Troy Aikman, and Lisa Salters
- Recap, Game Book

Game information

**First quarter**

- DAL – CeeDee Lamb 11-yard pass from Cooper Rush (Brandon Aubrey kick), 8:55. Cowboys 7–0. **Drive: 9 plays, 60 yards, 4:29.**
- CIN – Ja'Marr Chase 5-yard pass from Joe Burrow (Cade York kick), 2:45. Tied 7–7. **Drive: 11 plays, 70 yards, 6:10.**

**Second quarter**

- DAL – Brandon Aubrey 35-yard field goal, 6:23. Cowboys 10–7. **Drive: 7 plays, 39 yards, 3:28.**
- CIN – Chase Brown 19-yard pass from Joe Burrow (Cade York kick), 3:35. Bengals 14–10. **Drive: 6 plays, 64 yards, 2:53.**
- CIN – Cade York 37-yard field goal, 0:30. Bengals 17–10. **Drive: 7 plays, 36 yards, 1:20.**

**Third quarter**

- DAL – Brandin Cooks 3-yard pass from Cooper Rush (Brandon Aubrey kick), 10:32. Tied 17–17. **Drive: 8 plays, 70 yards, 4:28.**

**Fourth quarter**

- DAL – Brandon Aubrey 47-yard field goal, 14:55. Cowboys 20–17. **Drive: 13 plays, 54 yards, 6:55.**
- CIN – Cade York 29-yard field goal, 10:24. Tied 20–20. **Drive: 9 plays, 58 yards, 4:31.**
- CIN – Ja'Marr Chase 40-yard pass from Joe Burrow (Cade York kick), 1:01. Bengals 27–20. **Drive: 3 plays, 57 yards, 0:52.**

**Top passers**

- CIN – Joe Burrow – 33/44, 369 yards, 3 TD, INT
- DAL – Cooper Rush – 16/31, 183 yards, 2 TD, INT

**Top rushers**

- CIN – Chase Brown – 14 rushes, 58 yards
- DAL – Rico Dowdle – 18 rushes, 131 yards

**Top receivers**

- CIN – Ja'Marr Chase – 14 receptions, 177 yards, 2 TD
- DAL – CeeDee Lamb – 6 receptions, 93 yards, TD

The Cowboys continued their homestand with a matchup against the Cincinnati Bengals. Dallas entered this game having been eliminated from contention for the NFC East title due to the Philadelphia Eagles' win over the Carolina Panthers the day before. In addition, the retractable roof of AT&T Stadium was opened for the first time since 2022. While the Cowboys played the Bengals close for most of the game, a devastating special teams blunder would ultimately cost them the game — after the Cowboys blocked a Bengals punt late in the fourth quarter, Amani Oruwariye would inadvertently touch the ball past the line of scrimmage, which the Bengals recovered. The play was ruled as a muffed catch, giving Cincinnati a fresh set of downs. Three plays later, Joe Burrow threw the go-ahead touchdown pass to Ja'Marr Chase with 1:09 remaining. The Cowboys failed to respond on their final drive, and dropped to 5–8 on the season. This was the Cowboys' first loss to the Bengals since the 2004 season, as well as their first home loss to Cincinnati since 1988.

==== Week 15: at Carolina Panthers ====
Week 15: Dallas Cowboys at Carolina Panthers – Game summary

Quarter	1	2	3	4	Total
**Cowboys**	0	10	14	6	**30**
Panthers	0	7	0	7	**14**

at Bank of America Stadium, Charlotte, North Carolina

- Date: December 15
- Game time: 1:00 p.m. EST/12:00 p.m. CST
- Game weather: Cloudy, 45 °F (7 °C)
- Game attendance: 70,570
- Referee: Bill Vinovich
- TV announcers (Fox): Joe Davis, Greg Olsen and Pam Oliver
- Recap, Game Book

Game information

**First quarter**

- No scoring plays.

**Second quarter**

- DAL – CeeDee Lamb 14-yard pass from Cooper Rush (Brandon Aubrey kick), 9:01. Cowboys 7–0. **Drive: 10 plays, 77 yards, 5:45.**
- DAL – Brandon Aubrey 52-yard field goal, 4:05. Cowboys 10–0. **Drive: 6 plays, 14 yards, 2:14.**
- CAR – Jalen Coker 83-yard pass from Bryce Young (Eddy Piñeiro kick), 0:31. Cowboys 10–7. **Drive: 1 play, 83 yards, 0:11.**

**Third quarter**

- DAL – Jalen Tolbert 11-yard pass from Cooper Rush (Brandon Aubrey kick), 12:46. Cowboys 17–7. **Drive: 5 plays, 29 yards, 2:04.**
- DAL – Jalen Brooks 17-yard pass from Cooper Rush (Brandon Aubrey kick), 6:55. Cowboys 24–7. **Drive: 6 plays, 78 yards, 3:28.**

**Fourth quarter**

- DAL – Brandon Aubrey 45-yard field goal, 14:12. Cowboys 27–7. **Drive: 10 plays, 46 yards, 5:21.**
- CAR – Bryce Young 6-yard run (Eddy Piñeiro kick), 9:13. Cowboys 27–14. **Drive: 12 plays, 70 yards, 4:59.**
- DAL – Brandon Aubrey 41-yard field goal, 6:09. Cowboys 30–14. **Drive: 6 plays, 23 yards, 3:04.**

**Top passers**

- DAL – Cooper Rush – 18/29, 214 yards, 3 TD
- CAR – Bryce Young – 19/28, 219 yards, TD, 2 INT

**Top rushers**

- DAL – Rico Dowdle – 25 rushes, 149 yards
- CAR – Chuba Hubbard – 10 rushes, 32 yards

**Top receivers**

- DAL – CeeDee Lamb – 9 receptions, 116 yards, TD
- CAR – Jalen Coker – 4 receptions, 110 yards, TD

==== Week 16: vs. Tampa Bay Buccaneers ====
Week 16: Tampa Bay Buccaneers at Dallas Cowboys – Game summary

Quarter	1	2	3	4	Total
Buccaneers	0	14	3	7	**24**
**Cowboys**	10	13	3	0	**26**

at AT&T Stadium, Arlington, Texas

- Date: December 22
- Game time: 7:20 p.m. CST
- Game weather: None (retractable roof closed)
- Game attendance: 93,103
- Referee: Land Clark
- TV announcers (NBC): Mike Tirico, Cris Collinsworth and Melissa Stark
- Recap, Game Book

Game information

**First quarter**

- DAL – Brandon Aubrey 58-yard field goal, 9:06. Cowboys 3–0. **Drive: 10 plays, 30 yards, 5:54.**
- DAL – Jalen Tolbert 10-yard pass from Cooper Rush (Brandon Aubrey kick), 2:49. Cowboys 10–0. **Drive: 5 plays, 52 yards, 2:08.**

**Second quarter**

- TB – Bucky Irving 2-yard run (Chase McLaughlin kick), 11:30. Cowboys 10–7. **Drive: 6 plays, 57 yards, 3:15.**
- DAL – Brandon Aubrey 49-yard field goal, 9:15. Cowboys 13–7. **Drive: 5 plays, 39 yards, 2:15.**
- DAL – Ezekiel Elliott 1-yard run (Brandon Aubrey kick), 1:45. Cowboys 20–7. **Drive: 9 plays, 80 yards, 2:29.**
- TB – Jalen McMillan 11-yard pass from Baker Mayfield (Chase McLaughlin kick), 0:48. Cowboys 20–14. **Drive: 7 plays, 71 yards, 0:57.**
- DAL – Brandon Aubrey 58-yard field goal, 0:00. Cowboys 23–14. **Drive: 6 plays, 30 yards, 0:48.**

**Third quarter**

- DAL – Brandon Aubrey 53-yard field goal, 6:33. Cowboys 26–14. **Drive: 5 plays, 30 yards, 2:34.**
- TB – Chase McLaughlin 45-yard field goal, 0:31. Cowboys 26–17. **Drive: 11 plays, 43 yards, 6:02.**

**Fourth quarter**

- TB – Ryan Miller 13-yard pass from Baker Mayfield (Chase McLaughlin kick), 2:36. Cowboys 26–24. **Drive: 9 plays, 87 yards, 2:07.**

**Top passers**

- TB – Baker Mayfield – 31/43, 303 yards, 2 TD, INT
- DAL – Cooper Rush – 26/35, 292 yards, TD

**Top rushers**

- TB – Bucky Irving – 16 rushes, 68 yards, TD
- DAL – Rico Dowdle – 13 rushes, 23 yards

**Top receivers**

- TB – Mike Evans – 5 receptions, 69 yards
- DAL – CeeDee Lamb – 7 receptions, 105 yards

Before the Cowboys took the field, the Cowboys were eliminated from playoff contention after the Washington Commanders defeated the Philadelphia Eagles earlier that day.

==== Week 17: at Philadelphia Eagles ====
Week 17: Dallas Cowboys at Philadelphia Eagles – Game summary

Quarter	1	2	3	4	Total
Cowboys	7	0	0	0	**7**
**Eagles**	7	17	10	7	**41**

at Lincoln Financial Field, Philadelphia, Pennsylvania

- Date: December 29
- Game time: 1:00 p.m. EST/12:00 p.m. CST
- Game weather: Sunny, 62 °F (17 °C)
- Game attendance: 69,879
- Referee: Brad Allen
- TV announcers (Fox): Joe Davis, Greg Olsen and Pam Oliver
- Recap, Game Book

Game information

**First quarter**

- PHI – C. J. Gardner-Johnson 69-yard interception return (Jake Elliott kick), 11:43. Eagles 7–0.
- DAL – Jalen Tolbert 4-yard pass from Cooper Rush (Brandon Aubrey kick), 5:38. Tied 7–7. **Drive: 12 plays, 70 yards, 6:05.**

**Second quarter**

- PHI – DeVonta Smith 22-yard pass from Kenny Pickett (Jake Elliott kick), 6:38. Eagles 14–7. **Drive: 10 plays, 81 yards, 6:11.**
- PHI – Jake Elliott 31-yard field goal, 1:55. Eagles 17–7. **Drive: 11 plays, 26 yards, 4:35.**
- PHI – Kenny Pickett 1-yard run (Jake Elliott kick), 0:00. Eagles 24–7. **Drive: 4 plays, 65 yards, 0:36.**

**Third quarter**

- PHI – Jake Elliott 26-yard field goal, 8:03. Eagles 27–7. **Drive: 12 plays, 59 yards, 6:57.**
- PHI – A. J. Brown 20-yard pass from Tanner McKee (Jake Elliott kick), 2:44. Eagles 34–7. **Drive: 8 plays, 65 yards, 3:50.**

**Fourth quarter**

- PHI – DeVonta Smith 25-yard pass from Tanner McKee (Jake Elliott kick), 10:03. Eagles 41–7. **Drive: 7 plays, 75 yards, 4:22.**

**Top passers**

- DAL – Cooper Rush – 15/28, 147 yards, TD, 2 INT
- PHI – Kenny Pickett – 10/15, 143 yards, TD

**Top rushers**

- DAL – Rico Dowdle – 23 rushes, 104 yards
- PHI – Saquon Barkley – 31 rushes, 167 yards

**Top receivers**

- DAL – Brandin Cooks – 4 receptions, 52 yards
- PHI – DeVonta Smith – 6 receptions, 120 yards, 2 TD

The Cowboys traveled to Philadelphia seeking to avenge their Week 10 loss. A promising opening drive for the Cowboys ended in disaster when Cooper Rush threw a 69-yard pick six to C. J. Gardner-Johnson to give the Eagles a 7–0 lead. The Cowboys responded with a twelve-play, 70-yard drive culminating in a game-tying Jalen Tolbert touchdown reception for what ultimately would be Dallas's only points of the afternoon. After the teams traded punts twice, the Eagles reclaimed a 14–7 lead with a DeVonta Smith touchdown and never looked back. The Cowboys turned the ball over twice before halftime, leading to 10 more Eagles points and a 24–7 deficit. Philadelphia then scored 17 points in the second half to put the game out of reach for Dallas. With the crushing 41–7 loss, the Cowboys dropped to 7–9 on the year, thus sealing their first losing season since 2020. It was also the first time since 2011 that the Cowboys were swept by the Eagles.

==== Week 18: vs. Washington Commanders ====
Week 18: Washington Commanders at Dallas Cowboys – Game summary

Quarter	1	2	3	4	Total
**Commanders**	0	3	7	13	**23**
Cowboys	3	3	3	10	**19**

at AT&T Stadium, Arlington, Texas

- Date: January 5
- Game time: 12:00 p.m. CST
- Game weather: None (retractable roof closed)
- Game attendance: 91,349
- Referee: Clete Blakeman
- TV announcers (Fox): Adam Amin, Mark Sanchez and Kristina Pink
- Recap, Game Book

Game information

**First quarter**

- DAL – Brandon Aubrey 34-yard field goal, 8:20. Cowboys 3–0. **Drive: 8 plays, 75 yards, 4:28.**

**Second quarter**

- DAL – Brandon Aubrey 41-yard field goal, 12:41. Cowboys 6–0. **Drive: 4 plays, -1 yard, 2:04.**
- WAS – Zane Gonzalez 47-yard field goal, 4:40. Cowboys 6–3. **Drive: 9 plays, 34 yards, 2:59.**

**Third quarter**

- DAL – Brandon Aubrey 36-yard field goal, 8:52. Cowboys 9–3. **Drive: 12 plays, 53 yards, 6:08.**
- WAS – Zach Ertz 5-yard pass from Marcus Mariota (Zane Gonzalez kick), 5:07. Commanders 10–9. **Drive: 8 plays, 70 yards, 3:45.**

**Fourth quarter**

- DAL – Brandon Aubrey 22-yard field goal, 13:53. Cowboys 12–10. **Drive: 15 plays, 66 yards, 6:14.**
- WAS – Marcus Mariota 5-yard run (pass failed), 11:18. Commanders 16–12. **Drive: 8 plays, 70 yards, 2:35.**
- DAL – Rico Dowdle 2-yard run (Brandon Aubrey kick), 7:02. Cowboys 19–16. **Drive: 8 plays, 70 yards, 4:16.**
- WAS – Terry McLaurin 5-yard pass from Marcus Mariota (Zane Gonzalez kick), 0:03. Commanders 23–19. **Drive: 11 plays, 91 yards, 3:15.**

**Top passers**

- WAS – Marcus Mariota – 15/18, 161 yards, 2 TD
- DAL – Trey Lance – 20/34, 244 yards

**Top rushers**

- WAS – Marcus Mariota – 5 rushes, 56 yards, TD
- DAL – Rico Dowdle – 22 rushes, 72 yards, TD

**Top receivers**

- WAS – Terry McLaurin – 8 receptions, 62 yards, TD
- DAL – Jalen Tolbert – 4 receptions, 98 yards

With this loss, the Cowboys finished the season at 7–10. They also finished the year 2–7 at home, their worst home record since 2015. Eight days after the loss, on January 13, the Cowboys announced that head coach Mike McCarthy's contract would not be renewed as the team could not reach an agreement with him on an extension, thus ending his tenure in Dallas. It marked the first time since 2020 that the Cowboys would miss the playoffs.

=== Standings ===
==== Division ====
NFC East
	W	L	T	PCT	DIV	CONF	PF	PA	STK
^{(2)} Philadelphia Eagles	14	3	0	.824	5–1	9–3	463	303	W2
^{(6)} Washington Commanders	12	5	0	.706	4–2	9–3	485	391	W5
Dallas Cowboys	7	10	0	.412	3–3	5–7	350	468	L2
New York Giants	3	14	0	.176	0–6	1–11	273	415	L1

==== Conference ====
NFC
Seed	Team	Division	W	L	T	PCT	DIV	CONF	SOS	SOV	STK
**Division leaders**
1	Detroit Lions	North	15	2	0	.882	6–0	11–1	.516	.494	W3
2	Philadelphia Eagles	East	14	3	0	.824	5–1	9–3	.453	.424	W2
3 (Note: Tampa Bay clinched the #3 seed over Los Angeles based on conference record. (Tampa Bay 8–4 to Los Angeles 6–6))	Tampa Bay Buccaneers	South	10	7	0	.588	4–2	8–4	.502	.465	W2
4 (Note: Los Angeles clinched the NFC West and #4 seed over Seattle based on strength of victory. (Los Angeles .441 to Seattle .424))	Los Angeles Rams	West	10	7	0	.588	4–2	6–6	.505	.441	L1
**Wild cards**
5	Minnesota Vikings	North	14	3	0	.824	4–2	9–3	.474	.408	L1
6	Washington Commanders	East	12	5	0	.706	4–2	9–3	.436	.358	W5
7	Green Bay Packers	North	11	6	0	.647	1–5	6–6	.533	.412	L2
**Did not qualify for the postseason**
8	Seattle Seahawks	West	10	7	0	.588	4–2	6–6	.498	.424	W2
9 (Note: Atlanta finished ahead of Arizona based on conference record. (Atlanta 7–5 to Arizona 4–8))	Atlanta Falcons	South	8	9	0	.471	4–2	7–5	.519	.426	L2
10	Arizona Cardinals	West	8	9	0	.471	3–3	4–8	.536	.404	W1
11	Dallas Cowboys	East	7	10	0	.412	3–3	5–7	.522	.387	L2
12	San Francisco 49ers	West	6	11	0	.353	1–5	4–8	.564	.402	L4
13 (Note: Chicago finished ahead of Carolina based on head-to-head victory.)	Chicago Bears	North	5	12	0	.294	1–5	3–9	.554	.388	W1
14 (Note: Carolina finished ahead of New Orleans based on strength of victory. (Carolina .329 to New Orleans .306))	Carolina Panthers	South	5	12	0	.294	2–4	4–8	.498	.329	W1
15	New Orleans Saints	South	5	12	0	.294	2–4	4–8	.505	.306	L4
16	New York Giants	East	3	14	0	.176	0–6	1–11	.554	.412	L1
**Tiebreakers** (Note: When breaking ties for three or more teams under the NFL's rules, they are first broken within divisions, then comparing only the highest ranked remaining team from each division.)
