= Israel Mukuamu =

American football player (born 1999)

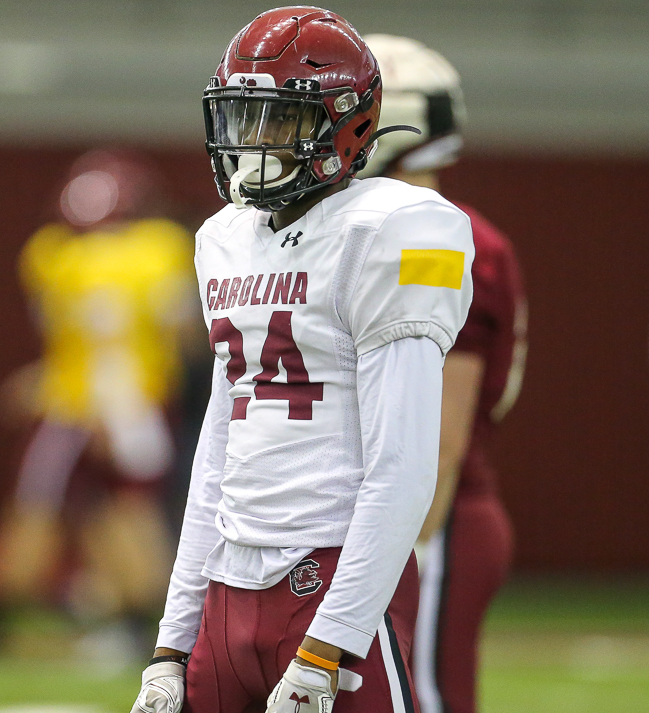
- Mukuamu with the South Carolina Gamecocks in 2020

Profile
- Position: Safety

Personal information
- Born: November 28, 1999 (age 26); Charlotte, North Carolina, U.S.
- Listed height: 6 ft 4 in (1.93 m)
- Listed weight: 215 lb (98 kg)

Career information
- High school: Parkway (Bossier City, Louisiana)
- College: South Carolina (2018–2020)
- NFL draft: 2021: 6th round, 227th overall pick

Career history
- Dallas Cowboys (2021–2024); Carolina Panthers (2025); Pittsburgh Steelers (2026)*
- * Offseason or practice squad member only

Awards and highlights
- Second-team All-SEC (2019)

Career NFL statistics
- Total tackles: 42
- Fumble recoveries: 1
- Pass deflections: 4
- Interceptions: 3
- Stats at Pro Football Reference

Israel Mukuamu (MOO-kwah-moo; born November 28, 1999) is an American professional football safety. He played college football for the South Carolina Gamecocks, and was selected by the Dallas Cowboys in the sixth round of the 2021 NFL draft.

== Early life ==
Mukuamu grew up in Moncks Corner, South Carolina and originally attended Berkeley Senior High School. As a junior, he helped turn the team into a winning program with a 9-3 record.

His family moved to Bossier City, Louisiana before his senior year and transferred to Parkway High School. As a senior, he received All-Southwest Region honors.

He originally committed to play college football at Florida State University, but de-committed after head coach Jimbo Fisher left for Texas A&M University and opted to attend the University of South Carolina instead.

== College career ==
As a true freshman in 2018, Mukuamu played in all 13 games with 2 starts, making 17 tackles, two tackles for loss, one interception, one pass broken up and a forced fumble. His first start came at safety in the twelfth game against the University of Akron.

As a sophomore in 2019, he was named the starter at safety for the season opener, before being moved to right cornerback opposite future NFL player Jaycee Horn. He received second-team All-SEC honors after finishing with 13 starts, 59 tackles (2 for loss), four interceptions (led the team) and 9 pass breakups. He had a standout game in the 20-17 upset win against the third ranked University of Georgia, collecting 11 tackles and 3 interceptions, including one returned for a 53-yard touchdown. He received National Defensive Player of the Week honors for his effort.

As a junior in 2020, Mukuamu played in 6 games with 5 starts at both cornerback and safety. He was limited with a recurring groin injury, recording 10 tackles and 2 interceptions (tied for the team lead). He had a highlight one-handed interception against the University of Florida. On November 17, 2020, following the dismissal of head coach Will Muschamp, Mukuamu opted out of the remainder 3 games of the season to focus on his preparation for the 2021 NFL draft. He finished his college career after appearing in 31 games with 19 starts, while making 86 tackles, 7 interceptions and 10 pass breakups.

=== College statistics ===
Year	School	Conf	Class	Pos	G	Tackles	INT	Pass Def	TD
2018	South Carolina	SEC	FR	DB	5	17	1	1	0
2019	South Carolina	SEC	SO	DB	12	59	4	9	1
2020	South Carolina	SEC	JR	DB	5	10	2	0	0
Career						86	7	10	1

== Professional career ==
Pre-draft measurables
Height	Weight	Arm length	Hand span	Wingspan	Vertical jump	Broad jump	Bench press
6 ft 4 1/8 in (1.93 m)	212 lb (96 kg)	34 in (0.86 m)	9 3/8 in (0.24 m)	6 ft 8 3/4 in (2.05 m)	36.5 in (0.93 m)	9 ft 11 in (3.02 m)	13 reps
All values from Pro Day

=== Dallas Cowboys ===
Mukuamu was selected by the Dallas Cowboys in the sixth round (227th overall) of the 2021 NFL draft, with the intention of playing him at safety. He signed his four-year rookie contract on May 13, 2021. He appeared in four games playing mostly on special teams and did not record any stat. On January 14, 2022, he was placed on the injured reserve with a hamstring injury, prior to the Wild Card playoff game against the San Francisco 49ers.

In 2022, he appeared in 15 games with 3 starts, registering 16 tackles, one interception and one pass breakup. He was declared inactive in the season finale. In Week 4 against the Washington Commanders, he had 6 tackles and one quarterback pressure. In the latter part of the season he received more playing time, after the Cowboys lost cornerbacks Anthony Brown and Jourdan Lewis, while the inconsistent production of second-year cornerbacks Kelvin Joseph and Nahshon Wright, led to the need of finding alternatives. He had his best performance as a Cowboy in the 31-14 Wild Card playoff victory against the Tampa Bay Buccaneers, when he was forced into the team's nickel cornerback role, making 5 tackles and 2 pass break ups.

In 2023, a hamstring injury caused him to miss most of training camp, falling on the depth chart behind second-year players DaRon Bland, Markquese Bell and Juanyeh Thomas. He appeared in 14 games playing mostly on special teams, posting 5 defensive tackles, one pass breakup, one fumble recovery and one special teams tackle. In Week 10 against the New York Giants, he had 2 tackles and one pass breakup.

In 2024, he remained as a special team player, appearing in 17 games, while registering 16 tackles, 2 interceptions, 2 pass breakups and four special teams tackles. In Week 12 against the Washington Commanders, he had one tackle, one pass breakup and made a game-clinching interception of a Hail Mary attempt as time expired. In Week 15 against the Carolina Panthers, he had 3 tackles, one interception and one pass breakup.

Mukuamu re-signed with the Cowboys on a one-year contract on March 14, 2025. He was released on August 26. He was part of the final cuts so the Cowboys could clear space on the roster to claim defensive backs Reddy Steward and Trikweze Bridges.

=== Carolina Panthers ===
On September 8, 2025, Mukuamu was signed to the Carolina Panthers practice squad. He was released by the Panthers on October 7. He re-signed with the Panthers practice squad on November 4. He played in the Week 11 game against the Atlanta Falcons and did not record any stat. He was released on November 18.

=== Columbus Aviators ===
On January 14, 2026, Mukuamu was selected by the Columbus Aviators of the United Football League (UFL).

=== Pittsburgh Steelers ===
On August 6, 2026, Mukuamu signed with the Pittsburgh Steelers. He reunited with head coach Mike McCarthy. He was waived with an injury settlement on August 24.

== Personal life ==
His father Muana “Charles” Mukuamu was born in the Democratic Republic of the Congo and competed in Judo.
