= Jourdan Lewis =

American football player (born 1995)

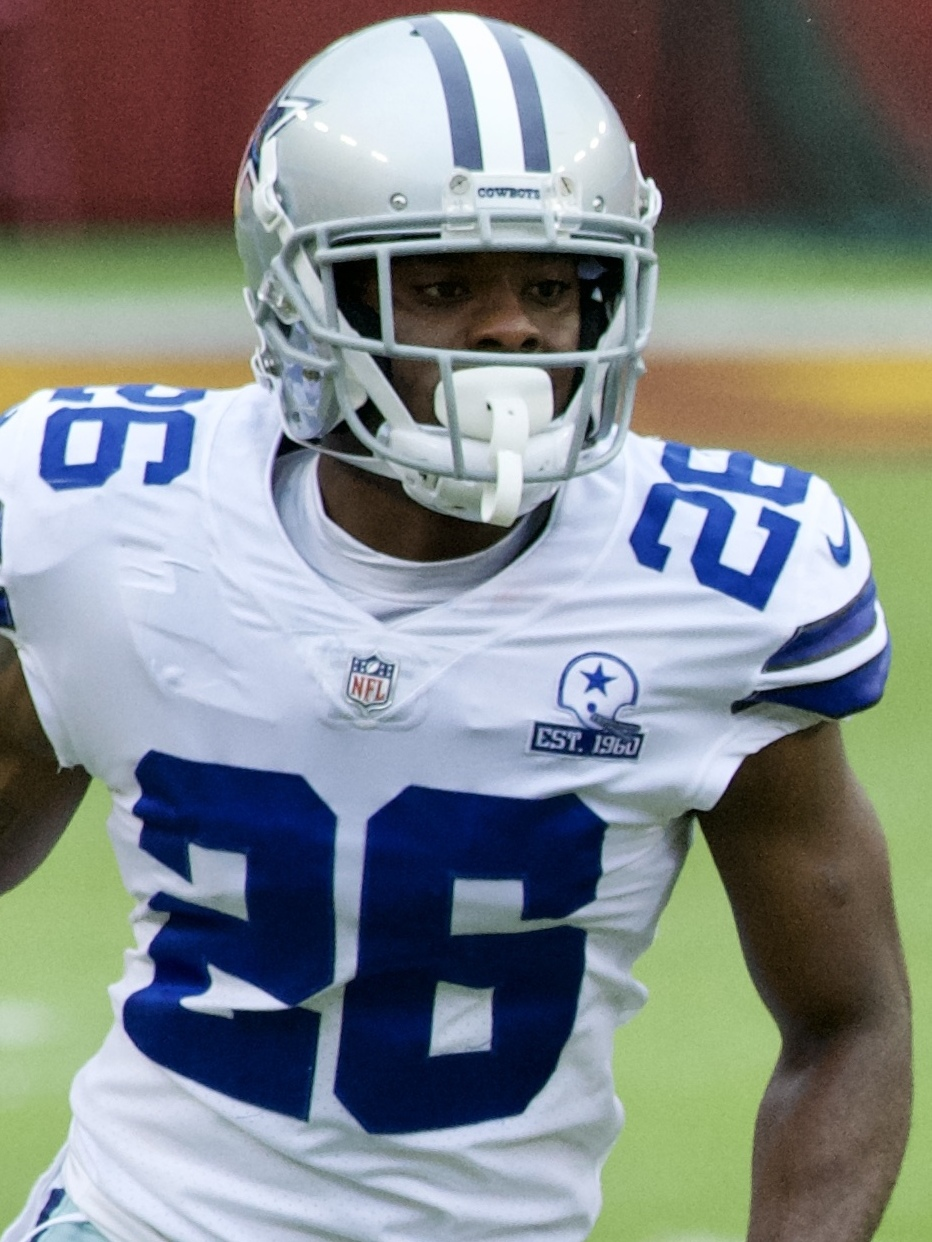
- Lewis with the Dallas Cowboys in 2020

No. 2 – Jacksonville Jaguars
- Position: Nickelback
- Roster status: Active

Personal information
- Born: August 31, 1995 (age 31); Detroit, Michigan, U.S.
- Listed height: 5 ft 10 in (1.78 m)
- Listed weight: 190 lb (86 kg)

Career information
- High school: Cass Technical (Detroit)
- College: Michigan (2013–2016)
- NFL draft: 2017: 3rd round, 92nd overall pick

Career history
- Dallas Cowboys (2017–2024); Jacksonville Jaguars (2025–present)

Awards and highlights
- 2× First-team All-American (2015, 2016); 2× First-team All-Big Ten (2015, 2016); Big Ten Defensive Back of the Year (2016)

Career NFL statistics as of Week 5, 2026
- Total tackles: 441
- Sacks: 9.5
- Forced fumbles: 5
- Fumble recoveries: 10
- Interceptions: 14
- Pass deflections: 56
- Defensive touchdowns: 1
- Stats at Pro Football Reference

Jourdan Julian Lewis (born August 31, 1995) is an American professional football nickelback for the Jacksonville Jaguars of the National Football League (NFL). Lewis was a two-time All-American for the Michigan Wolverines, and was selected by the Dallas Cowboys in the third round of the 2017 NFL draft.

== Early life ==
Lewis was raised in Detroit, Michigan, where he attended and played high school football at Cass Technical High School. As a junior, he tallied eight interceptions and 11 touchdowns. As a senior, he had 751 receiving yards, six touchdowns and 742 return yards with three touchdowns on special teams.

He and Lano Hill anchored the Cass Technical defensive backfield that won back-to-back (2011 and 2012) Michigan High School Athletic Association Division 1 championships for coach Thomas Wilcher.

== College career ==
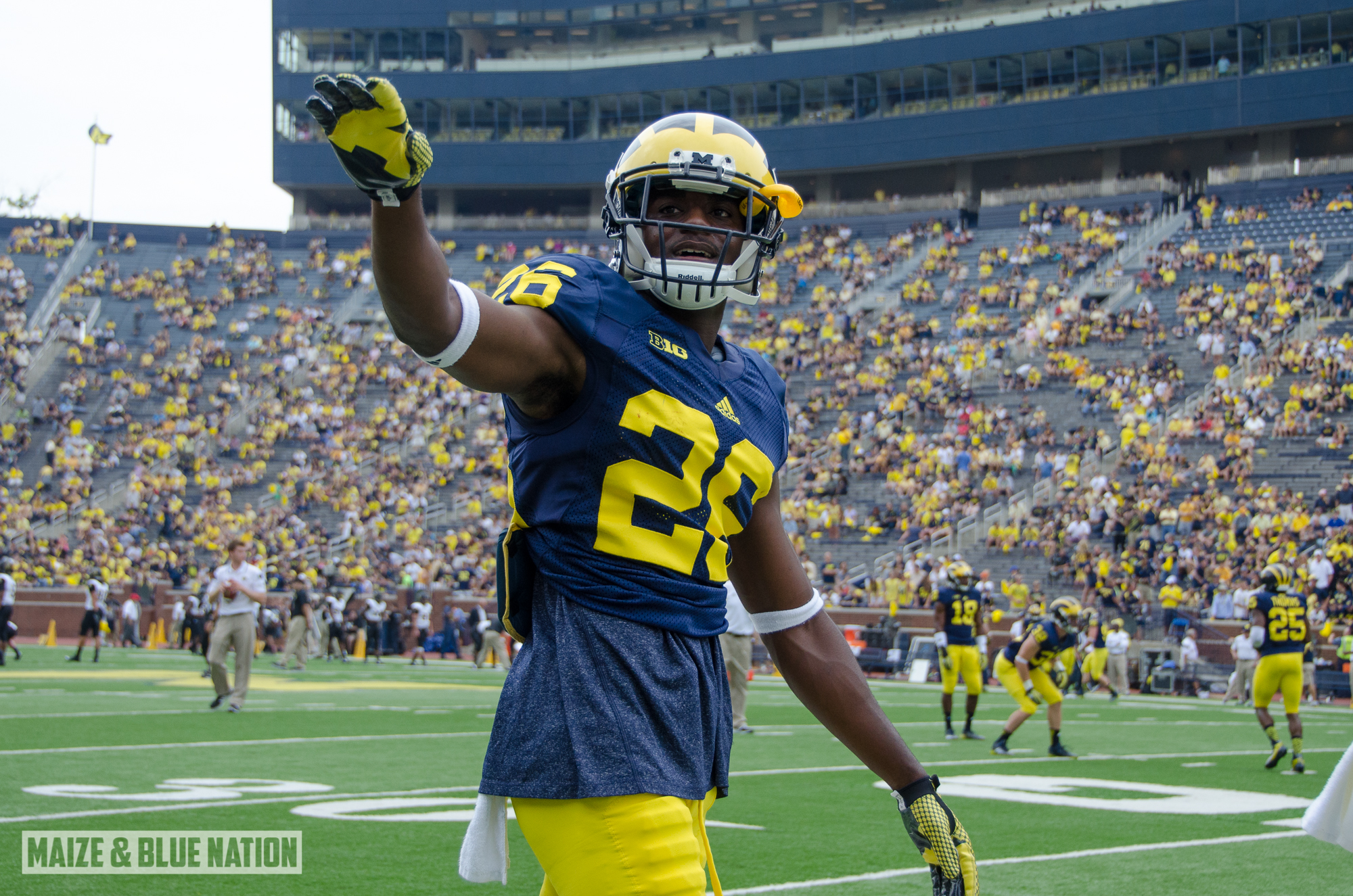
Lewis in 2014

Lewis accepted a football scholarship from the University of Michigan. As a freshman he appeared in 13 games, registering 17 tackles and two passes defensed.

As a sophomore, he appeared in 12 games (seven starts), collecting 39 tackles, 28 solo tackles, 1.5 tackles for loss, two interceptions and six passes defensed. He was named a starter in the third game of the season.

As a junior, he started 13 games, posting 52 tackles (3.5 for loss), two interceptions and 20 passes defensed (ranked third in the Football Bowl Subdivision (FBS)). He also averaged 25.2 yards on kickoff returns.

As a senior, he missed the first 3 games with injuries to his back, hamstring and quad. Through the first 10 games of the 2015 season, Lewis had 20 pass breakups, which set a new school record. He ranked second among all players in the NCAA Division I FBS with 21 passes defended. Lewis set a single-season school record with 21 pass breakups in 2015, surpassing the previous record of 18 held by Marlin Jackson (2002) and Leon Hall (2006). Following the 2015 season, Lewis was named to the All-Big Ten Conference defensive first-team, by both the media and coaches. He was also named a First-team All-American by USA Today, and Sports Illustrated, becoming the first Wolverine to earn the honor since Taylor Lewan in 2013, and the first Wolverine defensive back to earn the honor since Leon Hall in 2006.

During the 2016 season, Lewis was targeted 31 times, allowing 74 yards, with 14 total yards after catch and 0.36 yards per snap in coverage. Lewis has contributed 23 tackles, 3.5 tackles-for-loss, two interceptions and 12 pass breakups this season. Following the 2016 season, Lewis was named the Tatum–Woodson Defensive Back of the Year, and was once again named to the All-Big Ten defensive first-team, by both the media and coaches. He was also named a first-team All-American by the Walter Camp Football Foundation, Associated Press, Sporting News, and Sports Illustrated.

== Professional career ==
=== Pre-draft ===
On January 10, 2017, it was reported that Lewis had accepted his invitation to participate in the 2017 Senior Bowl. On January 28, 2017, he recorded four combined tackles and displayed impressive coverage under Chicago Bears head coach John Fox as a part of the North team who lost 16–15 to the South. As a top ten cornerback prospect, Lewis attended NFL Combine and performed the majority of drills, but opted to skip the short shuttle and three-cone drill. On March 18, he performed at Michigan's Pro Day and chose to run his 40-yard dash (4.47), 20-yard dash (2.51), 10-yard dash (1.59), short shuttle (4.38), and three-cone drill (6.88) for representatives and scouts from all 32 NFL teams. NFL draft analysts projections for Lewis varied from as high as the second or third round to as low as the sixth or seventh round, mainly due to misdemeanor charges (of which he was later acquitted). He was ranked the sixth cornerback in the draft by NFL analyst Mel Kiper Jr. and the tenth best cornerback prospect by DraftScout.com.

Pre-draft measurables
Height	Weight	Arm length	Hand span	Wingspan	40-yard dash	10-yard split	20-yard split	20-yard shuttle	Three-cone drill	Vertical jump	Broad jump	Bench press
5 ft 10 1/4 in (1.78 m)	188 lb (85 kg)	31 5/8 in (0.80 m)	9 1/4 in (0.23 m)	6 ft 3 1/8 in (1.91 m)	4.47 s	1.59 s	2.51 s	4.38 s	6.88 s	34.5 in (0.88 m)	10 ft 1 in (3.07 m)	15 reps
All values from NFL Combine/Pro Day

=== Dallas Cowboys ===
The Dallas Cowboys selected Lewis in the third round (92nd overall) of the 2017 NFL draft. He was the 14th cornerback selected in 2017 and was the second of three cornerbacks the Dallas Cowboys drafted. The Cowboys selected Chidobe Awuzie in the second round (60th overall) and Marquez White in the sixth round (216th overall).

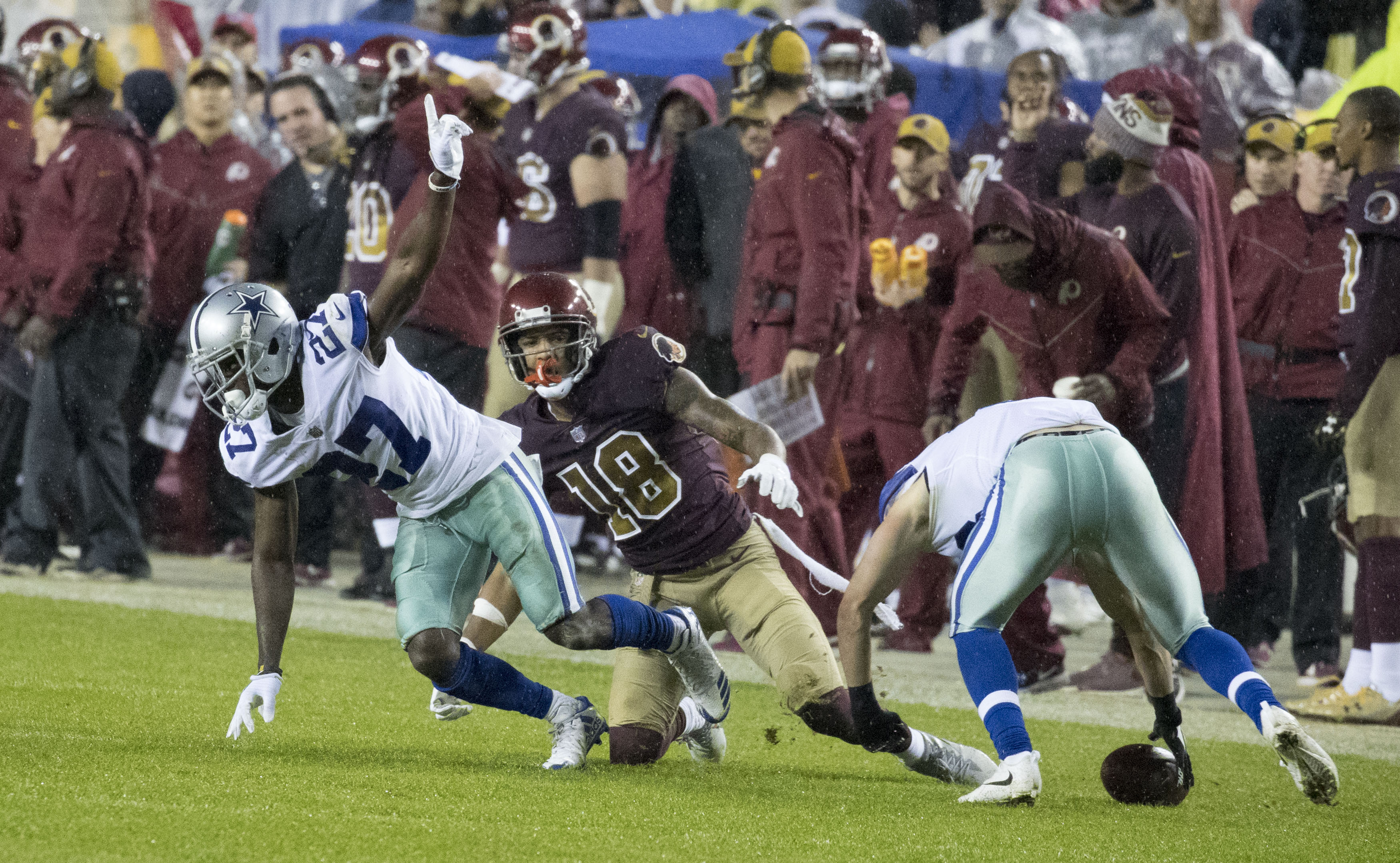
Jourdan Lewis covers Josh Doctson in a game against the Washington Redskins.

==== 2017 ====
On June 28, the Dallas Cowboys signed Lewis to a four–year, $3.24 million rookie contract that includes a signing bonus of $753,428.

He was expected to compete with Orlando Scandrick, Chidobe Awuzie, Anthony Brown, and Nolan Carroll for a job as a starting cornerback, but suffered a hamstring injury during his first training camp practice, causing him to be sidelined for the entire preseason.

He remained inactive for the Dallas Cowboys' 19–3 victory against the New York Giants, but added to the active roster after Orlando Scandrick suffered a broken hand during the Week 1 home-opener. Head coach Jason Garrett named him a backup as the fourth cornerback on the depth chart, behind Anthony Brown, Nolan Carroll, and Chidobe Awuzie. On September 17, 2017, Lewis made his professional regular season debut at the Denver Broncos and was immediately received ample playing time after both Nolan Carroll and Chidobe Awuzie exited the game due to a concussion and a hamstring injury. In their place, Lewis made six solo tackles, a pass deflection, and had his first career interception on a pass attempt by Trevor Siemian to wide receiver Demaryius Thomas during the third quarter of a 42–17 loss at the Broncos. In Week 3, Lewis earned his first career start in place of Nolan Carroll and as he started as a nickelback alongside Orlando Scandrick and Anthony Brown. He recorded six solo tackles and made a pass deflection before exiting in the fourth quarter of a 28–17 win at the Arizona Cardinals due to a hamstring injury. In Week 5, he collected a season-high seven combined tackles (five solo) and set a season-high with three pass deflections during a 35–31 loss against the Green Bay Packers. Following the game, the Cowboys announced their decision to release Nolan Carroll. Following Week 12, Anthony Brown was benched in favor of Chidobe Awuzie who started the final four games, beginning in Week 13. Orlando Scandrick suffered a back injury in Week 13 and was placed on injured reserve due to transverse process fractures in his back. Subsequently, rookies Lewis and Awuzie would be the starting cornerbacks for the remainder of the season. On December 10, 2017, Lewis earned his first start paired with Awuzie and made six combined tackles (five solo) and tied his season-high of three pass deflections as the Cowboys won 30–10 at the New York Giants. He finished his rookie season with 54 combined tackles (48 solo), ten passes defended, and one interception in 15 games and seven starts. He earned an overall grade of 79.6 from Pro Football Focus in 2017.

==== 2018 ====
On January 22, 2018, the Cowboys hired former Seattle Seahawks' defensive coordinator Kris Richard as their passing game coordinator and defensive backs coach. Entering training camp, it was expected that Lewis would begin as a starting cornerback, but was instead placed on second-team after Richard decided to transition Byron Jones from safety to cornerback. It was speculated Richard's decision to give Jones first-team reps over Lewis was due to his history of favoring taller more athletic cornerbacks with Jones at 6'0" and Lewis at 5"10". Lewis was forced to compete to be a starting cornerback against Chidobe Awuzie, Byron Jones, and Anthony Brown. Head coach Jason Garrett named Lewis a backup cornerback to start the season and listed him fourth on the depth chart behind Byron Jones, Chidobe Awuzie, and Anthony Brown.

On November 29, 2018, Lewis made one solo tackle, a pass deflection, and secured the Cowboys' 10–13 victory against the New Orleans Saints after making his first career interception off a pass thrown by Drew Brees to running back Alvin Kamara with around two minutes remaining in the fourth quarter. In Week 16, Lewis earned his only start of the season and collected a season-high seven combined tackles (six solo) during a 27–20 victory against the Tampa Bay Buccaneers. He finished the season with 12 combined tackles (ten solo), two fumble recoveries, a pass deflection, and one interception in 15 games and one start.

The Dallas Cowboys finished the 2018 NFL season first in the NFC East with a 10–6 record, clinching a playoff berth. On January 5, 2019, Lewis appeared on his first career playoff game and mainly appeared on special teams as the Cowboys defeated the Seattle Seahawks 24–22 in the NFC Wild-Card Game. On January 12, 2019, Lewis made three kick returns and two solo tackles during a 22–30 loss at the Los Angeles Rams in the Divisional Round.

==== 2019 ====
During training camp, he competed for a job as a starting cornerback against Byron Jones, Anthony Brown, Chidobe Awuzie, and Michael Jackson under Cowboys' defensive coordinator Rod Marinelli. Head coach Jason Garrett named him a backup to begin the season as the fourth cornerback on the depth chart behind Chidobe Awuzie, Anthony Brown, and Byron Jones.

In Week 6, Lewis recorded four combined tackles (three solo), made a pass deflection, and intercepted a pass by Sam Darnold to wide receiver Jamison Crowder during a 24–22 loss at the New York Jets. The following week, he had four solo tackles and had his first career sack on Carson Wentz for an eight–yard loss during a 37–10 win against the Philadelphia Eagles in Week 7. On November 4, 2019, Lewis had six combined tackles (three solo) and recovered a fumble forced by teammate Dorance Armstrong on Daniel Jones and returned it for 63–yards to score his first career touchdown in the fourth quarter of a 37–18 win at the New York Giants. In Week 15, he collected a season-high seven combined tackles (six solo), broke up a pass, and had one sack as the Cowboys defeated the Los Angeles Rams 44–21. He finished the season with 51 combined tackles (39 solo), six pass deflections, a career-high four sacks, two interceptions, a fumble recovery, and one touchdown in 16 games and five starts. He received an overall grade of 68.7 from Pro Football Focus in 2019.

==== 2020 ====
On January 7, 2020, Cowboys' owner Jerry Jones announced his decision to hire Mike McCarthy as the head coach after he chose not to re-new Jason Garrett's contract following an 8–8 record in 2019. Throughout training camp, he competed to be a starting cornerback against Anthony Brown, Chidobe Awuzie, and Trevon Diggs following the departure of Byron Jones. He also was a candidate to be the starting nickelback with the other competitor being Anthony Brown under new defensive coordinator Mike Nolan. He injured his ankle early in training camp and was inactive for the Cowboys' 17–20 loss at the Los Angeles Rams in Week 1 season-opener.

Upon his return in Week 2, head coach Mike McCarthy named him the starting nickelback alongside starting outside cornerbacks Trevon Diggs and Chidobe Awuzie. On October 11, 2020, Lewis collected a season-high six solo tackles during a 37–34 win against the New York Giants. He finished the season with 55 combined tackles (40 solo), two pass deflections, two sacks, and a fumble recovery in 15 games and 13 starts. He received an overall grade of 66.4 from Pro Football Focus in 2020.

==== 2021 ====
On January 11, 2021, the Cowboys hired Dan Quinn as their new defensive coordinator after they fired Mike Nolan.

On March 17, 2021, the Dallas Cowboys re-signed Lewis to a three–year, $13.50 million contract extension that included $7.75 million guaranteed, $4.75 million guaranteed upon signing, and an initial signing bonus of $3.50 million. He entered training camp slated to return as starting nickelback under Dan Quinn. Head coach Mike McCarthy named him the first-team nickelback to begin the season, alongside starting cornerbacks Trevon Diggs and Anthony Brown.

On September 9, 2021, Lewis started in the Dallas Cowboys' season-opener at the Tampa Bay Buccaneers and made two solo tackles, a pass deflection, a fumble recovery, and intercepted a pass by Tom Brady in the endzone to return it 66–yards during a 29–31 loss. In Week 12, he collected a season-high seven combined tackles (five solo) and had one sack during a 33–36 overtime loss against the Las Vegas Raiders. On December 19, 2021, Lewis made a solo tackle, a season-high four pass deflections, and set a career-high with his third interception of the season off a pass by Mike Glennon to wide receiver Sterling Shepard during a 21–6 win at the New York Giants. On December 24, 2021, the Cowboys placed Lewis on the COVID-19/reserve list. He was inactive for the Cowboys' 56–14 victory against the Washington Football Team in Week 16. On December 30, 2021, the Cowboys removed him from the COVID-19/reserve list and added him back to their active roster. He finished the 2021 NFL season with a total of 61 combined tackles (47 solo), 11 pass deflections, a career-high three interceptions, two fumble recoveries, 1.5 sacks, and one forced fumble in 16 games and 13 starts. Pro Football Focus had Lewis finish the season with an overall grade of 61.3, which ranked 75th among 129 qualifying cornerbacks in 2021.

==== 2022 ====
During training camp, he competed to be the No. 2 starting cornerback against Anthony Brown and Kelvin Joseph. Head coach Mike McCarthy named Lewis the third cornerback on the depth chart and the starting nickelback to begin the season, alongside starters Trevon Diggs and Anthony Brown.

In Week 3, Lewis collected a season-high seven solo tackles during a 23–16 win at the New York Giants. He was inactive during the Cowboys' 25–10 victory against the Washington Commanders in Week 4 due to a groin injury. On October 23, 2022, Lewis made three combined tackles (two solo), a pass deflection, and intercepted a pass attempt by Jared Goff to wide receiver Tom Kennedy in the fourth quarter, but exited the 24–6 victory against the Detroit Lions after sustaining a foot injury after badly twisting his foot while making the interception. On October 26, 2022, the Cowboys announced that Lewis had officially been placed on injured reserve after undergoing surgery due to a Lisfranc injury that sidelined him for the last ten games (Weeks 8–18) of the season. He finished the 2022 NFL season with only 26 combined tackles (17 solo), a pass deflection, a sack, and one interception in six games and four starts.

==== 2023 ====
He was unable to participate in training camp due to his Liafranc injury and was expected to compete against DaRon Bland to be the third cornerback on the depth chart. He was unable to return during training camp and began the season on the PUP list. Head coach Mike McCarthy named Lewis a backup as the fourth cornerback on the depth chart to begin the regular season, behind Trevon Diggs, Stephon Gilmore, and DaRon Bland.

On August 29, 2023, the Cowboys removed him from the PUP list and added him to the active roster, but he remained inactive during the Cowboys' 40–0 victory at the New York Giants in their Week 1 season-opener. Beginning in Week 8, Lewis began starting at dimeback in place of safeties Jayron Kearse and Markquese Bell. In Week 12, he collected a season-high six combined tackles (four solo) as the Cowboys defeated the Washington Commanders 45–10. On December 30, 2023, Lewis tied his season-high of six combined tackles (three solo), tied his season-high of two pass deflections, and had his only interception of the season on a pass thrown by Jared Goff to running back David Montgomery as the Cowboys defeated the Detroit Lions 20–19. He finished the 2023 NFL season with a total of 52 combined tackles (36 solo), five pass deflections, three forced fumbles, two fumble recoveries, and one interception in 16 games and eight starts. He received an overall grade of 52.5 from Pro Football Focus in 2023, which ranked 106th among all qualifying cornerbacks.

==== 2024 ====
On March 14, 2024, the Dallas Cowboys re-signed Lewis to a fully–guaranteed one–year, $2.82 million contract that included an initial signing bonus of $167,500. The Cowboys hired Mike Zimmer as their new defensive coordinator following the departure of Dan Quinn, who became the Washington Commanders' head coach. Head coach Mike McCarthy named him the primary nickelback to start the season, alongside starting cornerbacks Trevon Diggs and Caelen Carson.

He was inactive during the Cowboys' 10–34 loss to the Houston Texans in Week 11 due to a neck injury. In Week 14, Lewis racked up a season-high seven combined tackles (four solo) during a 20–27 loss against the Cincinnati Bengals. On December 22, 2024, Lewis made six combined tackles (three solo), set a season-high with two pass deflections, and intercepted a pass by Baker Mayfield to wide receiver Jalen McMillan as the Cowboys defeated the Tampa Bay Buccaneers 26–24. He finished the 2024 NFL season with 71 combined tackles (39 solo), eight pass deflections, one forced fumble, one fumble recovery, an interception, and one sack in 16 games and 13 starts. He received an overall grade of 71.7 from Pro Football Focus, which ranked 36th among 222 qualifying cornerbacks in 2024.

=== Jacksonville Jaguars ===
==== 2025 ====
On March 12, 2025, the Jacksonville Jaguars signed Lewis to a three–year, $30 million contract that includes $20 million guaranteed upon signing and an initial signing bonus of $10 million. He played in 12 games (including seven starts) for Jacksonville, recording 39 tackles, 10 passes defensed, and two interceptions. On December 25, it was announced that Lewis would require season-ending surgery to repair a foot injury suffered in Week 16 against the Denver Broncos; he was placed on injured reserve as a result.

== NFL career statistics ==
Legend
**Bold**	Career high

=== Regular season ===
Year	Team	Games		Tackles					Interceptions						Fumbles				
Year	Team	GP	GS	Cmb	Solo	Ast	Sck	TFL	Int	Yds	Avg	Lng	TD	PD	FF	Fmb	FR	Yds	TD
2017	DAL	15	7	54	**48**	6	0.0	2	1	25	25.0	25	0	10	0	0	0	0	0
2018	DAL	15	1	12	10	2	0.0	0	1	7	7.0	7	0	1	0	0	**2**	14	0
2019	DAL	16	5	51	38	13	**4.0**	4	2	20	10.0	20	0	6	0	0	1	**63**	**1**
2020	DAL	15	13	59	40	19	2.0	**7**	0	0	0.0	0	0	2	0	0	1	0	0
2021	DAL	16	13	61	47	14	1.5	1	**3**	**88**	**29.3**	**66**	0	**11**	1	0	**2**	10	0
2022	DAL	6	4	26	17	9	1.0	0	1	0	0.0	0	0	1	0	0	0	0	0
2023	DAL	16	8	52	36	16	0.0	2	1	0	0.0	0	0	5	**3**	0	**2**	0	0
2024	DAL	16	13	**71**	39	**32**	1.0	3	1	0	0.0	0	0	8	1	0	1	0	0
2025	JAX	12	7	39	21	18	0.0	5	2	6	3.0	6	0	10	0	0	1	0	0
2026	JAX	5	1	16	11	5	0.0	0	2	45	22.5	45	0	2	0	0	0	0	0
Career		132	72	441	307	134	9.5	24	14	191	13.6	66	0	56	5	0	10	87	1

=== Postseason ===
Year	Team	Games		Tackles					Interceptions						Fumbles				
Year	Team	GP	GS	Cmb	Solo	Ast	Sck	TFL	Int	Yds	Avg	Lng	TD	PD	FF	Fmb	FR	Yds	TD
2018	DAL	2	0	**2**	**2**	0	0.0	0	0	0	0.0	0	0	0	0	0	0	0	0
2021	DAL	1	0	**2**	1	**1**	0.0	0	0	0	0.0	0	0	0	0	0	0	0	0
2023	DAL	1	1	0	0	0	0.0	0	0	0	0.0	0	0	0	0	0	0	0	0
Career		4	1	4	3	1	0.0	0	0	0	0.0	0	0	0	0	0	0	0	0

== Personal life ==
On March 15, 2017, Ann Arbor Police responded to Lewis's apartment in Washtenaw County, Michigan, after his girlfriend had called 911 and told police that he had assaulted her. The woman claimed to authorities that Lewis had grabbed her by the neck and held her to the ground following an argument about bills. Lewis was not at the apartment upon the arrival of Ann Arbor Police, but had spoken with the police on the telephone and also met with officers a few miles from the apartment. According to the police report, when police arrived at the apartment they saw no visible injuries on the woman and it was reported she did not receive any medical attention for injuries. Although he was not arrested, Ann Arbor Police charged him with misdemeanor domestic violence and he was given notice to later appear in court. This altercation occurred while Lewis was going through the pre-draft process and many draft analysts speculated this incident would affect his draft stock.

"I'm real proud for the Cowboys and proud for him. He's got a chance to really be a fine player and he is a good person."

— Jerry Jones (Dallas Cowboys' owner)

On July 24, 2017, his trial began in Washtenaw County District Court after he was not able to reach a plea bargain with defense attorneys. The following day, the jury ultimately found not guilty of misdemeanor domestic violence.
