= DaRon Bland =

American football player (born 1999)

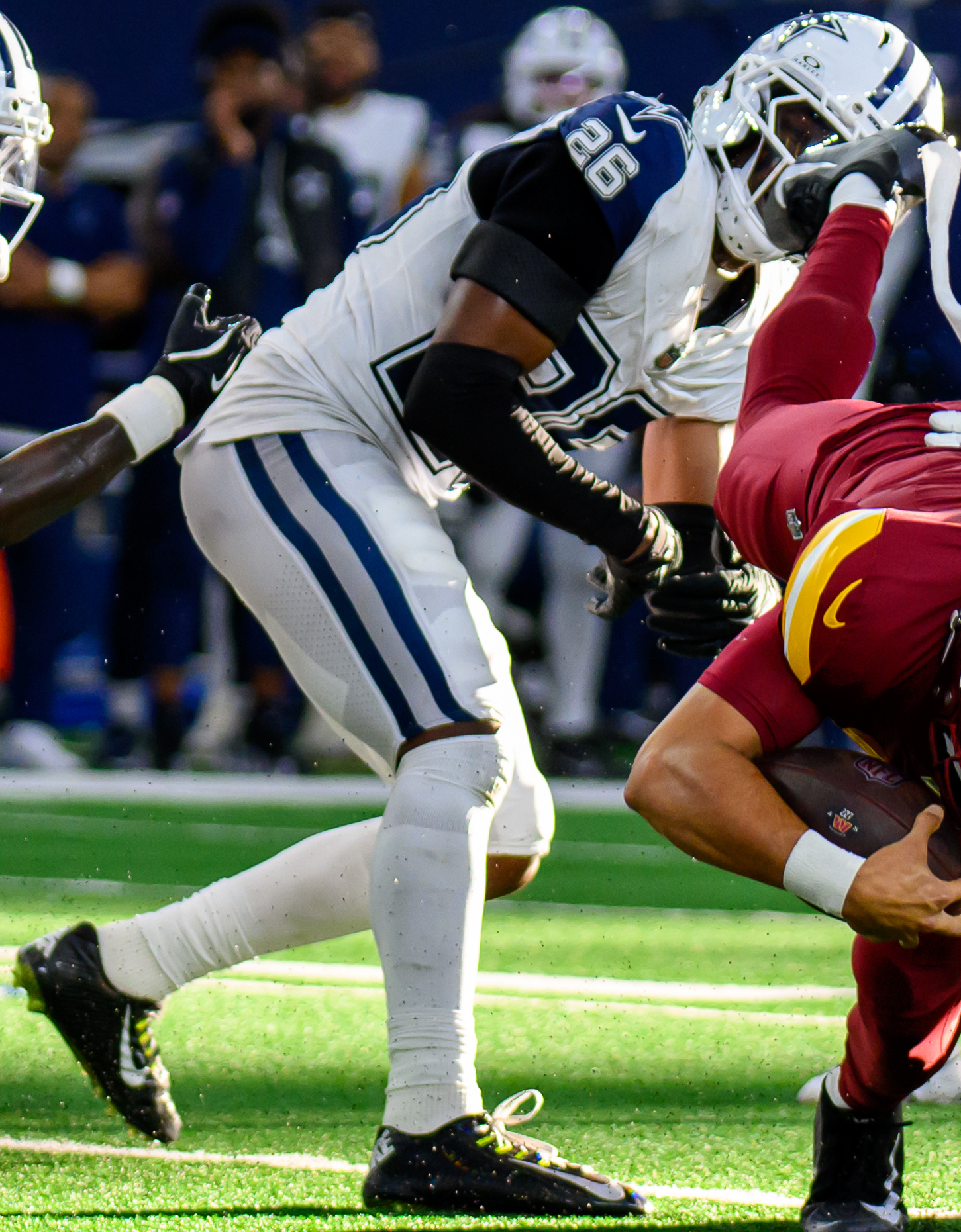
- Bland with the Dallas Cowboys in 2025

No. 26 – Dallas Cowboys
- Position: Cornerback
- Roster status: Injured reserve

Personal information
- Born: July 12, 1999 (age 27); Modesto, California, U.S.
- Listed height: 6 ft 0 in (1.83 m)
- Listed weight: 202 lb (92 kg)

Career information
- High school: Central Catholic (Modesto)
- College: Sacramento State (2017–2020); Fresno State (2021)
- NFL draft: 2022: 5th round, 167th overall pick

Career history
- Dallas Cowboys (2022–present)

Awards and highlights
- First-team All-Pro (2023); Pro Bowl (2023); NFL interceptions leader (2023); First-team All-Big Sky (2019); NFL records: Most interceptions returned for touchdown in a season: 5; Most defensive touchdowns in a season: 5 (tied with Ken Houston)

Career NFL statistics as of Week 10, 2026
- Total tackles: 275
- Forced fumbles: 1
- Fumble recoveries: 1
- Pass deflections: 40
- Interceptions: 15
- Defensive touchdowns: 6
- Stats at Pro Football Reference

DaRon Bland (/dəˈrɒn/ də-RON; born July 12, 1999) is an American professional football cornerback for the Dallas Cowboys of the National Football League (NFL). He played college football for the Sacramento State Hornets before transferring to the Fresno State Bulldogs. The Cowboys selected Bland in the fifth round of the 2022 NFL draft. In 2023, he led the NFL with 9 interceptions and set the NFL single-season record for most interceptions returned for a touchdown with five; this also tied Ken Houston's record for the most defensive touchdowns in a single season.

== Early life ==
Bland grew up in Modesto, California, and attended Central Catholic High School, playing receiver on the football team as well as running track and field. He was named the Valley Oak League Defensive Player of the Year as a senior.

== College career ==
Bland began his college career at Sacramento State. As a junior, he was named first-team All-Big Sky Conference after recording 43 tackles, 6.5 tackles for loss, one sack, and forced fumbles with two interceptions and eight passes broken up. After his senior season was canceled and moved to the spring of 2021 due to the COVID-19 pandemic, Bland entered the NCAA Transfer Portal. Bland ultimately committed to transfer to Fresno State. In his only season with the Bulldogs, he recorded 45 tackles with five passes defended and two interceptions in 13 games played.

== Professional career ==
Pre-draft measurables
Height	Weight	Arm length	Hand span	Wingspan	40-yard dash	10-yard split	20-yard split	20-yard shuttle	Three-cone drill	Vertical jump	Broad jump	Bench press
6 ft 0 1/4 in (1.84 m)	197 lb (89 kg)	32 in (0.81 m)	9 in (0.23 m)	6 ft 4 3/4 in (1.95 m)	4.48 s	1.55 s	2.59 s	4.15 s	7.26 s	35.5 in (0.90 m)	10 ft 3 in (3.12 m)	14 reps
All values from Pro Day

=== 2022 season ===
The Dallas Cowboys selected Bland in the fifth round (167th overall) of the 2022 NFL draft. He was the 23rd cornerback drafted in 2022.

On May 13, 2022, the Dallas Cowboys signed Bland to a four-year, $3.96 million contract that includes a signing bonus of $304,788.

Throughout training camp, Bland competed against Kelvin Joseph, Nahshon Wright, and Jourdan Lewis for a role as the primary backup cornerback and slot cornerback. Head coach Mike McCarthy named him the fifth cornerback on the depth chart to start his rookie season, behind Trevon Diggs, Anthony Brown, Jourdan Lewis, and Kelvin Joseph. He was also named the backup slot cornerback behind Lewis. Although Bland wore No. 30 throughout training camp, he opted to switch to No. 26 after it became available when Kyron Brown was released during final roster cuts.

On September 11, 2022, Bland made his professional regular season debut, but appeared only on special teams during a 3–19 loss in the home-opener against the Tampa Bay Buccaneers. On October 2, 2022, Bland saw his first action on defense after Jourdan Lewis was sidelined due to a groin injury. He made three solo tackles, a pass deflection, and his first career interception on a pass attempt to Curtis Samuel by quarterback Carson Wentz in the fourth quarter of a 25–10 win over the Washington Commanders. On October 24, 2022, defensive coordinator Dan Quinn promoted Bland to starting nickelback in place of Lewis, who was placed on injured reserve for the rest of the season after sustaining a lisfranc injury. In Week 10, Bland earned his first career start at nickelback and recorded six combined tackles (five solo) in a 28–31 loss at the Green Bay Packers. On December 4, 2022, he collected a season-high eight combined tackles (four solo), deflected two passes, and made a season-high two interceptions off pass attempts by Matt Ryan as the Cowboys defeated the Indianapolis Colts 54–19. In Week 15, he made six combined tackles (four solo), a pass deflection, and intercepted Trevor Lawrence to mark his fourth of the season in a 34–40 loss at the Jacksonville Jaguars. The following week, he made five combined tackles (four solo), a pass deflection, and intercepted a pass by Gardner Minshew to mark his fifth of the season in a 40-34 win against the Philadelphia Eagles. His five interceptions set an NFL record for most interceptions by a rookie. He finished the season with 54 combined tackles (38 solo), seven pass deflections, and five interceptions in 17 games and 8 starts.

The Dallas Cowboys earned a playoff berth as a wildcard after ending the regular season second in the NFC East with a 12–5 record. On January 16, 2023, Bland started in his first playoff appearance and made seven combined tackles (three solo) during a 31–14 victory at the Tampa Bay Buccaneers in the NFC Wildcard Game. The following week, he collected a season-high 11 combined tackles (seven solo) and deflected a pass as the Cowboys were eliminated from the playoffs as the San Francisco 49ers defeated them 12–19 in the NFC Divisional Round.

=== 2023 season ===
During training camp, he competed to be the primary backup cornerback against Kelvin Joseph and Nahshon Wright after Jourdan Lewis missed camp while he recovered from surgery and due to the departure of Anthony Brown. Head coach Mike McCarthy listed Bland as the third cornerback on the depth chart to begin the season, behind starters Trevon Diggs and Stephon Gilmore.

On September 10, 2023, Bland made three solo tackles, a pass deflection, and returned an interception by Daniel Jones 22-yards to score his first touchdown during a 40–0 win at the New York Giants. The pass was intended for Saquon Barkley, before it was broken up by Trevon Diggs and caught by Bland. On September 23, 2023, the Dallas Cowboys placed Trevon Diggs on injured reserve due to a torn ACL and in turn, defensive coordinator Dan Quinn named Bland his replacement as an outside starting cornerback alongside Stephon Gilmore.

In Week 4, Bland recorded four combined tackles (three solo), three pass deflections, two interceptions, and a touchdown in a 38–3 win over the New England Patriots. His two interceptions were thrown by Mac Jones and he scored his second touchdown after intercepting a pass to Kendrick Bourne and returned it for a 54-yard touchdown in the second quarter. On October 29, 2023, he made seven combined tackles (six solo), two pass deflections, and intercepted a pass by Matthew Stafford, while covering Cooper Kupp, and took it for a 30-yard touchdown as Dallas defeated the Los Angeles Rams 43–20. Bland's third touchdown in Week 7 set the Cowboys' franchise record for single-season interceptions returned for a touchdown previously held by five other players.

On November 19, 2023, Bland had five combined tackles (two solo), a pass deflection, and intercepted a pass from Bryce Young and returned it for his fourth interception return for a touchdown of the year, tying the NFL single-season record and the Cowboys career record during a 33–10 win at the Carolina Panthers. Bland was named NFC Defensive Player of the Week for his performance. On November 23, 2023, Bland collected a season-high ten combined tackles (seven solo), broke up a pass, and intercepted a pass from Sam Howell and returned 66–yards during a 45–10 win against the Washington Commanders. It was his fifth interception return for a touchdown of the year, setting the NFL single-season record. Bland was named NFC Defensive Player of the Month for November. In Week 13, he made six combined tackles (five solo), a pass deflection, and intercepted a pass by Geno Smith for his fourth consecutive game with an interception during a 41–35 win at the Seattle Seahawks. He had 69 combined tackles (53 solo), 15 pass deflections, a career-high nine interceptions, and a career-high five touchdowns in 17 games and 15 starts. He received an overall grade of 89.5 from Pro Football Focus, which ranked second among all qualifying cornerbacks in 2023.

=== 2024 season ===
During training camp in 2024, Bland suffered a stress fracture and began the season on injured reserve. On October 30, 2024, the Cowboys activated him from injured reserve after missing the first ten games of the season (Weeks 1–11). Upon his return, head coach Mike McCarthy named him a starting cornerback alongside Jourdan Lewis. On November 26, he collected a season-high nine combined tackles (six solo) and broke up a pass during a 27–20 win against the New York Giants. He finished the 2024 NFL season with a total of 41 combined tackles (29 solo), five pass deflections, one forced fumble, and a fumble recovery in seven games and seven starts.

=== 2025 season ===
On August 31, 2025, Bland signed a four-year, $92 million extension with $50 million guaranteed. At the time of the signing, the extension's $23 million annual average made Bland the NFL's sixth highest paid cornerback. He started 12 games for Dallas, compiling one interception (which he returned for a touchdown), six pass deflections, and 73 combined tackles. On December 20, Bland was placed on injured reserve after suffering a foot injury that required season-ending surgery.

== Career statistics ==
Legend
	Led the league
	NFL record
**Bold**	Career high

=== NFL ===
==== Regular season ====
Year	Team	Games		Tackles				Fumbles				Interceptions			
Year	Team	GP	GS	Cmb	Solo	Ast	Sck	FF	FR	Yds	TD	Int	Yds	TD	PD
2022	DAL	17	8	54	38	16	0.0	0	0	0	0	5	19	0	7
2023	DAL	17	15	69	**53**	16	0.0	0	0	0	0	**9**	**209**	**5**	**15**
2024	DAL	7	7	41	29	12	0.0	**1**	**1**	0	0	0	0	0	5
2025	DAL	12	12	**73**	45	**28**	0.0	0	0	0	0	1	68	1	6
2026	DAL	10	10	38	28	10	0.0	0	0	0	0	0	0	0	7
Career		63	52	275	193	82	0.0	1	1	0	0	15	296	6	40

==== Postseason ====
Year	Team	Games		Tackles				Fumbles				Interceptions			
Year	Team	GP	GS	Cmb	Solo	Ast	Sck	FF	FR	Yds	TD	Int	Yds	TD	PD
2022	DAL	2	2	**18**	**10**	**8**	0.0	0	0	0	0	0	0	0	**1**
2023	DAL	1	1	5	5	0	0.0	0	0	0	0	0	0	0	0
Career		3	3	23	15	8	0	0	0	0	0	0	0	0	1

=== College ===
Season	Team	GP	Tackles					Interceptions					Fumbles		
Season	Team	GP	Solo	Ast	Cmb	TfL	Sck	Int	Yds	Avg	TD	PD	FR	FF	TD
2017	Sacramento State	7	5	3	2	0.0	0.0	0	0	0.0	0	0	0	0	0
2018	Sacramento State	10	33	11	44	3.0	0.0	1	**47**	**47.0**	0	6	0	**1**	0
2019	Sacramento State	13	30	**13**	43	**6.5**	**1.0**	**2**	43	21.5	0	**10**	**1**	**1**	0
2020	Sacramento State	0	Season cancelled due to the COVID-19 pandemic												
2021	Fresno State	13	**34**	11	**45**	1.0	0.0	**2**	38	19.0	0	5	0	**1**	0
Career		43	102	38	140	10.5	1.0	5	128	25.6	0	21	1	3	0
