= Kelvin Joseph =

American football player (born 1999)

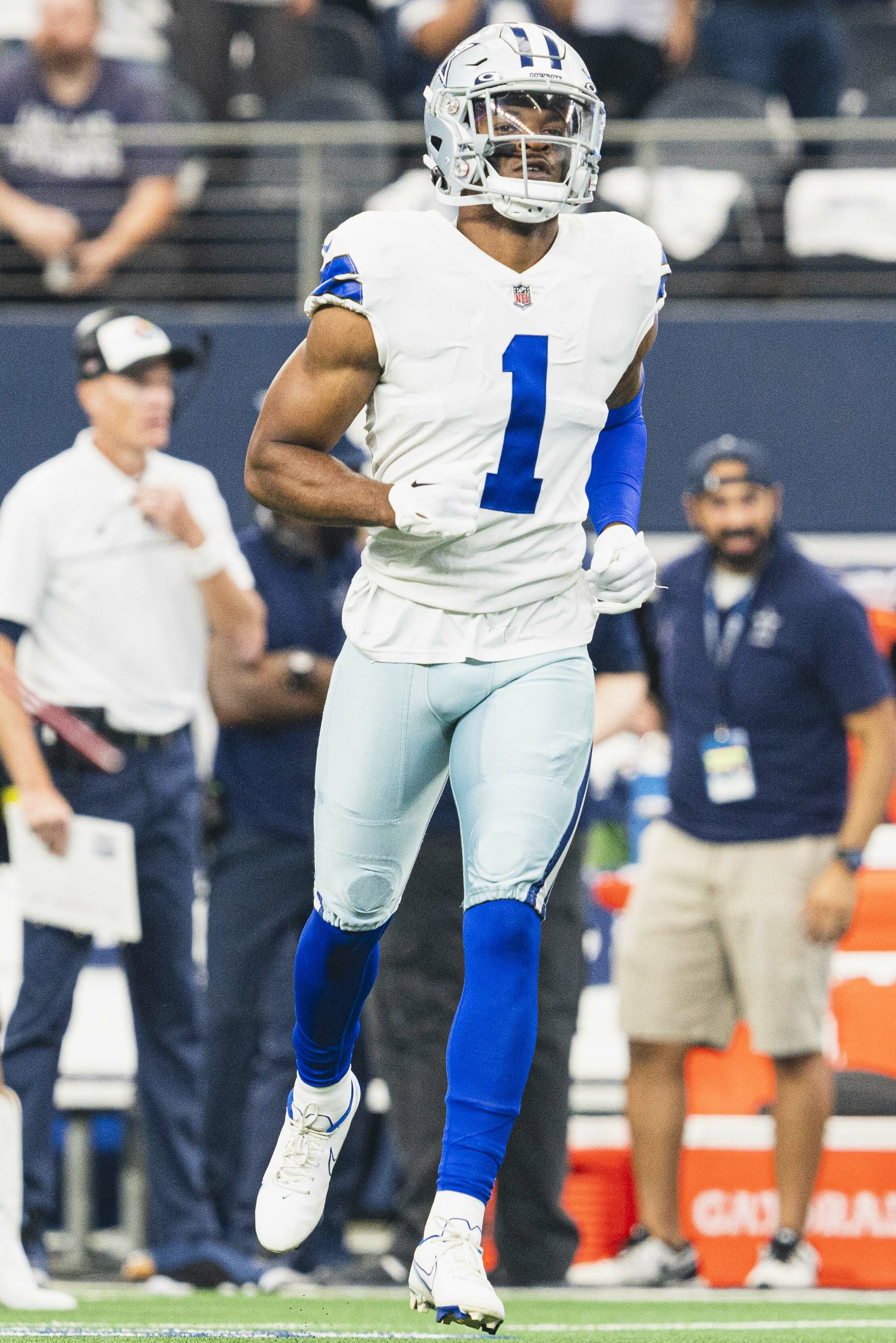
- Joseph with the Dallas Cowboys in 2022

Profile
- Position: Cornerback

Personal information
- Born: November 11, 1999 (age 26); Baton Rouge, Louisiana, U.S.
- Listed height: 5 ft 11 in (1.80 m)
- Listed weight: 197 lb (89 kg)

Career information
- High school: Scotlandville Magnet (Baton Rouge)
- College: LSU (2018); Kentucky (2019–2020)
- NFL draft: 2021: 2nd round, 44th overall pick

Career history
- Dallas Cowboys (2021–2022); Miami Dolphins (2023); Seattle Seahawks (2023); Kansas City Chiefs (2024)*; Indianapolis Colts (2024); Minnesota Vikings (2024)*; DC Defenders (2025)
- * Offseason or practice squad member only

Awards and highlights
- UFL champion (2025)

Career NFL statistics
- Total tackles: 39
- Forced fumbles: 1
- Fumble recoveries: 1
- Pass deflections: 4
- Stats at Pro Football Reference

Kelvin Joseph Jr (born November 11, 1999) is an American professional football cornerback. He was selected by the Dallas Cowboys in the second round of the 2021 NFL draft. He played college football at LSU and Kentucky.

== Early life ==
Joseph grew up in Baton Rouge, Louisiana, and attended Scotlandville Magnet High School. As a junior, he tallied 67 tackles, 3 interceptions (2 returned for touchdowns) and 12 pass breakups, while contributing to the team winning the 5A state title. He received All-District, District 4-5A Co-Defensive MVP, All-Metro and Class 5A All-state honors.

As a senior, he had 113 tackles, 12 tackles for loss and three interceptions. He was named class 5A All-State and played in the All-American Bowl. He scored a combined 13 touchdowns, from punts, kickoffs and interception returns over the course of his high school career. He also practiced basketball and was a teammate of Javonte Smart.

Joseph committed to play college football at LSU over offers from Alabama, Florida State, Auburn, and Florida.

== College career ==
As a true freshman, he played in 11 games, making 12 tackles and breaking up a pass. He had 4 tackles against the University of Mississippi. He entered the transfer portal after being suspended from playing in the 2019 Fiesta Bowl for violating team rules, but later withdrew his name and participated in LSU's spring practices. Joseph re-entered the transfer portal in July 2019 and announced that he would be transferring to the University of Kentucky the following month.

Joseph sat out his sophomore year due to NCAA transfer rules. As a redshirt sophomore, he started in 9 games and was a part of a defense that had 5 players selected in the 2021 NFL draft. He recorded 9 starts, 25 tackles, a tackle for loss, one pass breakup and tied for second in the SEC with four interceptions in his only season of playing time with the Wildcats. He opted out of the last game left in the regular season, in order to focus on preparing for the 2021 NFL draft.

== Professional career ==
Pre-draft measurables
Height	Weight	Arm length	Hand span	40-yard dash	10-yard split	20-yard split	20-yard shuttle	Three-cone drill	Vertical jump	Broad jump
5 ft 11 1/2 in (1.82 m)	197 lb (89 kg)	31 7/8 in (0.81 m)	9 1/4 in (0.23 m)	4.34 s	1.44 s	2.48 s	4.23 s	7.21 s	35.0 in (0.89 m)	10 ft 8 in (3.25 m)
All values from Pro Day

=== Dallas Cowboys ===
Joseph was selected by the Dallas Cowboys in the second round (44th overall) of the 2021 NFL draft. He signed his four-year rookie contract with Dallas on June 10, 2021. He missed most of the OTAs after contracting COVID-19. He suffered a groin injury in the last preseason game against the Jacksonville Jaguars. He was placed on injured reserve on September 2, 2021, to start the season. He was activated on October 30. He spent most of the season playing on special teams. He played his most defensive snaps in the fifteenth game against the Washington Football Team. He started the last two games of the season. In the season finale against the Philadelphia Eagles, quarterback Gardner Minshew threw the ball to the sideline, where Joseph anticipated to make a play on the ball, but it bounced off his hands into the air, only to be caught by wide receiver DeVonta Smith. He appeared in 10 games, collecting 13 tackles (one for loss), 2 pass breakups and 2 special teams tackles.

In 2022, he was expected to compete for a starting role against Anthony Brown, but finished instead as a core special teams player. He played a lot against the Green Bay Packers, after Brown suffered a concussion and Jourdan Lewis was lost to injury in the previous contest. He entered in the third quarter of the twelfth game against the Indianapolis Colts, in place of Brown who suffered a torn Achilles tendon, but Joseph allowed a touchdown catch. In the thirteenth game against the Minnesota Vikings, he committed a pass interference penalty on his first play and left at halftime because he got sick. He started in the fourteenth game against the Jaguars, but gave up two touchdowns and was benched in favor of Nahshon Wright. After playing 37 defensive snaps in that game, he played just two in the final 3 contests of the season. He fared much better as a gunner on special teams. In the NFC Divisional playoff round against the San Francisco 49ers, he forced Ray-Ray McCloud to fumble on a punt return early in the third quarter. He appeared in 16 games, registering 13 defensive tackles, two pass breakups, one forced fumble and 7 special teams tackles (third on the team).

In the 2023 preseason, Joseph was worked at the nickel corner and safety positions, behind second-year player DaRon Bland.

=== Miami Dolphins ===
On August 29, 2023, the Cowboys traded Joseph to the Miami Dolphins in exchange for former first round draft choice Noah Igbinoghene. He appeared in 4 games as a backup cornerback and had 2 tackles. Joseph was released on November 14.

=== Seattle Seahawks ===
On November 26, 2023, the Seattle Seahawks signed Joseph to their practice squad. He was elevated to the active roster for the Week 16 game against the Tennessee Titans and had one tackle. He was released from the practice squad on January 15, 2024.

=== Kansas City Chiefs ===
On January 17, 2024, Joseph signed a reserve/future contract with the Kansas City Chiefs. On February 11, the Kansas City Chiefs defeated the San Francisco 49ers in Super Bowl LVIII and Joseph earned a ring. He was waived on August 26.

=== Indianapolis Colts ===
On September 10, 2024, the Indianapolis Colts signed Joseph to their practice squad, but was released two weeks later. He re-signed with the Colts practice squad on October 1. He appeared in 2 games and tallied one special teams tackle. He was released on October 29.

=== Minnesota Vikings ===
On December 4, 2024, Joseph was signed to the Minnesota Vikings practice squad. He was released on December 26.

=== DC Defenders ===
On February 24, 2025, Joseph signed with the DC Defenders of the United Football League (UFL).

== Personal life ==
Joseph has released rap records under the pseudonym "YKDV Bossman Fat". YKDV stands for "You Know Da Vibe".

=== Legal issues ===
In April 2022, Dallas police announced that they were seeking to speak with Joseph as a "person of interest" in their investigation of a fatal shooting that had occurred in March. Video footage of an altercation at a nightclub in the city's Lower Greenville neighborhood that preceded the murder showed that one of the men involved was wearing a "YKDV" necklace. In an interview with the Dallas Morning News on April 15, an attorney stated that Joseph was not the shooter but was a passenger in the vehicle from which the fatal shots were fired. A day after Joseph met with investigators, two men from his hometown of Baton Rouge were arrested in connection with the incident. Joseph was never charged with any crime relating to the incident.

On June 7, 2025, Joseph was arrested and charged with DWI and collision involving personal injury or death after he was involved with a fatal collision with a motorcycle. Joseph admitted to police that he was driving a BMW sedan on U.S. 75 in Richardson, Texas at approximately 4:50 AM when he struck and killed a motorcyclist. He allegedly continued driving for approximately three miles before calling the police at approximately 5:39 AM to report his involvement in the accident. Officers allegedly noticed visible signs of impairment and arrested Joseph after he failed field sobriety tests. He was released on $26,000 bond the next day. The victim's family filed a civil lawsuit against Joseph on June 24, 2025.
