= Caelen Carson =

American football player (born 2002)

No. 41 – Carolina Panthers
- Position: Cornerback
- Roster status: Practice squad

Personal information
- Born: March 3, 2002 (age 24); Waldorf, Maryland, U.S.
- Listed height: 6 ft 0 in (1.83 m)
- Listed weight: 198 lb (90 kg)

Career information
- High school: North Point (Waldorf)
- College: Wake Forest (2020–2023)
- NFL draft: 2024: 5th round, 174th overall pick

Career history
- Dallas Cowboys (2024–2026); Carolina Panthers (2026–present)*
- * Offseason or practice squad member only

Career NFL statistics as of Week 3, 2026
- Total tackles: 45
- Pass deflections: 6
- Stats at Pro Football Reference

Caelen Carson (born March 3, 2002) is an American professional football cornerback for the Carolina Panthers of the National Football League (NFL). He played college football for the Wake Forest Demon Deacons. He previously played for the Dallas Cowboys.

== Early life ==
Carson attended North Point High School in Waldorf, Maryland, where he was a wide receiver and a cornerback on the football team. He helped them reach the Maryland 4A state championship, while they had a 13-1 record. Carson was a first team All-Southern Maryland selection.

College recruiting
Name	Hometown	School	Height	Weight	Commit date
Caelen Carson; CB	Waldorf, MD	North Point	6 ft 0 in (1.83 m)	195 lb (88 kg)	Jun 5, 2019
Caelen Carson; CB	Recruit ratings: Scout: Rivals: 247Sports: ESPN:				
Overall recruit ranking: Rivals: Unranked 247Sports: 1725 ESPN: Unranked
Note: In many cases, Scout, Rivals, 247Sports, On3, and ESPN may conflict in their listings of height and weight.; In these cases, the average was taken. ESPN grades are on a 100-point scale.; Sources: "2022 Team Ranking". Rivals.com.

== College career ==
Carson played in all but one game his freshman year at Wake Forest University, and tallied up 25 tackles, a forced fumble, and one interception. He got his first interception of his career against Virginia. In 2021, he played every game up until a 58-55 loss to North Carolina, where he went down with an injury, and missed the rest of the season. He ended 2021 with 31 tackles, 2 interceptions, and a fumble recovery. 2022 was also hammered by injuries for Carson, as he injured his leg against Liberty on September 9, and didn't see the field until the Demon Deacons faced Louisville. He finished 2022 with 21 tackles, and no interceptions. He played in 11 out of 12 games in his redshirt junior year, and ended up with 42 tackles, a forced fumble, and a fumble recovery. After the season, he accepted an invite to the 2024 Senior Bowl. He also was invited for the NFL Combine.

=== College statistics ===
Year	Team	Games	Tackles				Fumbles		Interceptions			
Year	Team	Games	Solo	Asst.	Tot.	Sacks	FF	FR	Int.	Yds.	Avg.	TD
2020	Wake Forest	8	19	6	25	0	1	0	1	0	0	0
2021	Wake Forest	9	26	5	31	0	0	1	2	30	15.0	0
2022	Wake Forest	8	17	4	21	0	0	0	0	0	0	0
2023	Wake Forest	11	29	13	42	0	1	1	0	0	0	0
Total		36	91	28	119	0	2	2	3	30	10.0	0

== Professional career ==
Pre-draft measurables
Height	Weight	Arm length	Hand span	Wingspan	40-yard dash	10-yard split	20-yard split	Vertical jump	Broad jump	Bench press
5 ft 11 7/8 in (1.83 m)	199 lb (90 kg)	31 3/8 in (0.80 m)	8 1/4 in (0.21 m)	6 ft 3 5/8 in (1.92 m)	4.53 s	1.54 s	2.59 s	35.5 in (0.90 m)	9 ft 6 in (2.90 m)	6 reps
All values from NFL Combine/Pro Day

=== Dallas Cowboys ===
Carson was selected by the Dallas Cowboys with the 174th overall pick in the fifth round of the 2024 NFL draft. In Week 1, he was named the starting cornerback. In the 2024 season, Carson played six games, starting in five, and recorded 27 tackles and four pass deflections. Carson began the 2025 season on injured reserve after suffering a hyperextended knee in training camp. He was activated on October 18, 2025, ahead of the team's Week 7 matchup against the Washington Commanders. Throughout the season, Carson played 8 games, starting in three, and recorded 17 tackles and two pass deflections.

In the 2026 season, Carson played in three games before being waived on October 20, 2026.

=== Carolina Panthers ===
On October 30, 2026, Carson was signed to the Carolina Panthers' practice squad.
