= Nahshon Wright =

American football player (born 1998)

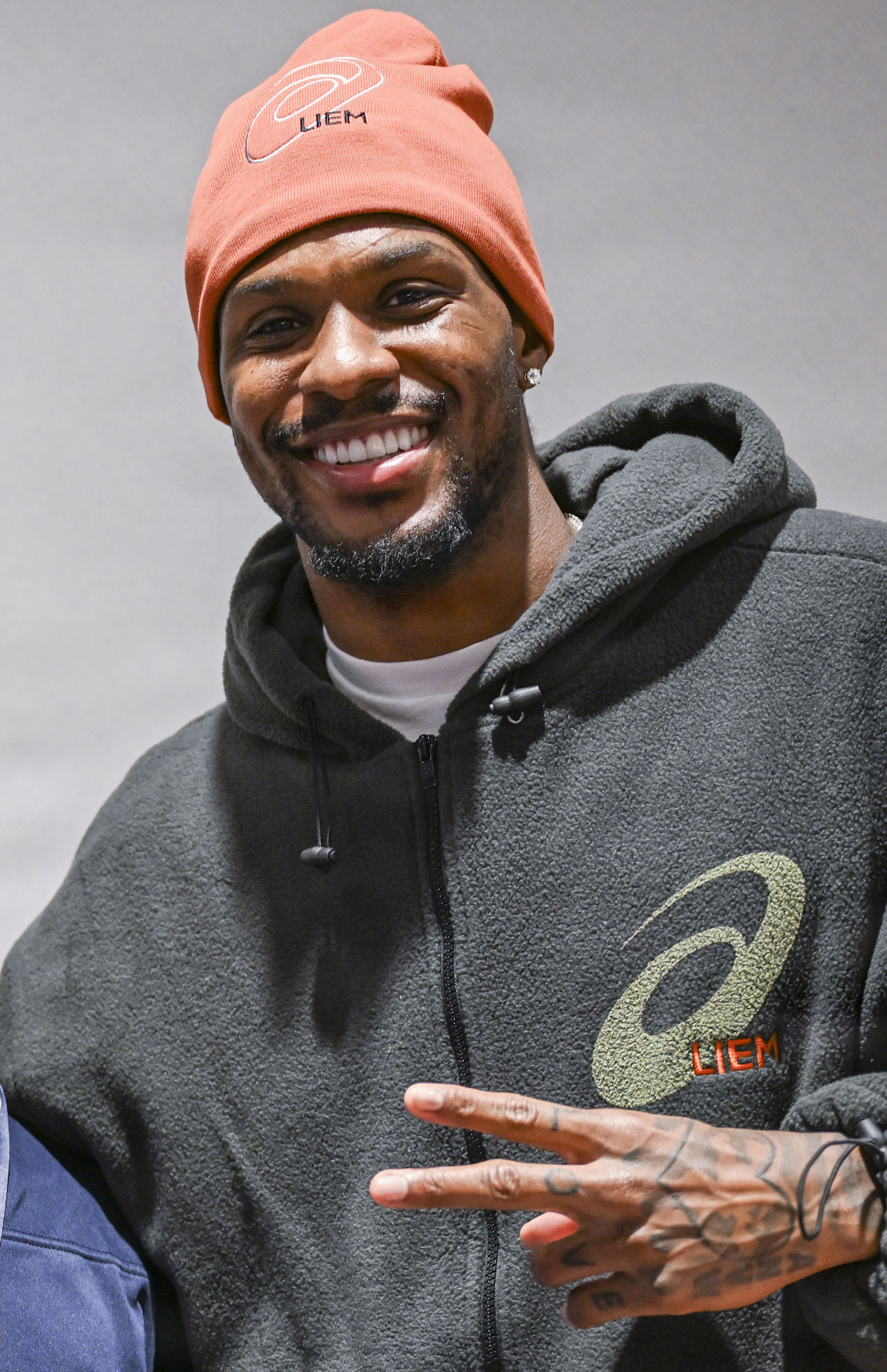
- Wright in 2025

No. 26 – New York Jets
- Position: Cornerback
- Roster status: Active

Personal information
- Born: September 23, 1998 (age 28); Hayward, California, U.S.
- Listed height: 6 ft 4 in (1.93 m)
- Listed weight: 190 lb (86 kg)

Career information
- High school: James Logan (Union City, California)
- College: Laney (2018); Oregon State (2019–2020)
- NFL draft: 2021: 3rd round, 99th overall pick

Career history
- Dallas Cowboys (2021–2023); Minnesota Vikings (2024); Chicago Bears (2025); New York Jets (2026–present)

Awards and highlights
- Pro Bowl (2025)

Career NFL statistics as of Week 10, 2026
- Total tackles: 118
- Pass deflections: 16
- Interceptions: 6
- Forced fumbles: 2
- Fumble recoveries: 3
- Defensive touchdowns: 1
- Stats at Pro Football Reference

Nahshon Wright (/nəˈʃɔːn/ nə-SHAWN; born September 23, 1998) is an American professional football cornerback for the New York Jets of the National Football League (NFL). He played college football for the Oregon State Beavers, and was selected by the Dallas Cowboys in the third round of the 2021 NFL draft. Wright has also played a single season for the Minnesota Vikings and Chicago Bears, where he earned his first Pro Bowl bid.

== Early life ==
Wright attended James Logan High School, where he played as a wide receiver and cornerback. He also lettered in basketball and track. He enrolled at Laney College, where he contributed to the team winning the 2018 state championship. He tallied 12 starts, 17 tackles (1.5 for loss), four interceptions, and three passes defensed, while earning All-conference honors.

He transferred to Oregon State University in 2019. As a sophomore, he appeared in all 12 games with 10 starts, posting 34 tackles (half a tackle for loss) and three interceptions.

As a junior in 2020, the football season was reduced to seven games due to the COVID-19 pandemic. He started in six games, registering 30 tackles, two interceptions, four passes defensed, and one sack. He had six tackles and one interception against California. He had seven tackles, one interception, and one pass defensed against Oregon. He had seven tackles and one sack against Stanford. He declared for the NFL draft after the season.

== Professional career ==
Pre-draft measurables
Height	Weight	Arm length	Hand span	Wingspan	40-yard dash	10-yard split	20-yard split	20-yard shuttle	Three-cone drill	Vertical jump	Broad jump	Bench press
6 ft 4 1/4 in (1.94 m)	183 lb (83 kg)	32 7/8 in (0.84 m)	9 1/8 in (0.23 m)	6 ft 5 7/8 in (1.98 m)	4.49 s	1.64 s	2.65 s	4.57 s	7.19 s	31.0 in (0.79 m)	10 ft 6 in (3.20 m)	6 reps
All values from Pro Day

=== Dallas Cowboys ===
Wright was selected by the Dallas Cowboys in the third round (99th overall) of the 2021 NFL draft. The selection was criticized in the media as a reach, while the team passed on other defensive backs like Elijah Molden, Ifeatu Melifonwu, Ambry Thomas and Brandon Stephens. Wright signed his four-year rookie contract with Dallas on July 21, worth $4.8 million. In Week 9 against the Denver Broncos, he touched a blocked punt after it passed the line of scrimmage, causing the officiating crew to award the ball back to the Broncos with a new set of downs. In Week 10 against the Atlanta Falcons, he recovered a blocked punt for a touchdown. He appeared in 13 games, playing mainly on special teams, finishing the season with 7 defensive tackles and two special teams tackles.

In 2022, he appeared in 7 games with two starts, registering 22 tackles (one for loss), one interception, 4 pass breakups and one special teams tackle. He was declared inactive in the first 5 games of the season. In the fourteenth game against the Jacksonville Jaguars, he replaced a struggling Kelvin Joseph at right cornerback. He started in the fifteenth game against the Philadelphia Eagles, compiling 8 tackles (one for loss) and 2 pass breakups. He started in the sixteenth game against the Tennessee Titans, leading the defense with a career-best 9 tackles, 2 pass breakups and his first career interception. He struggled with penalties in his 2 starts. In the season finale against the Washington Commanders, he was replaced in the starting lineup with Trayvon Mullen. He was declared inactive for the 2 playoff games, to allow the team to activate Israel Mukuamu.

On August 30, 2023, Wright was placed on injured reserve with an ankle injury. He was activated on October 16. He appeared in 12 games as a backup player, tallying 2 defensive tackles, one pass breakup and 3 special teams tackles.

=== Minnesota Vikings ===
On August 9, 2024, Wright was traded to the Minnesota Vikings in exchange for Andrew Booth Jr. He was waived on August 27, and re-signed to the practice squad.

Wright signed a reserve/future contract with Minnesota on January 17, 2025. On April 7, Wright was released by the Vikings.

=== Chicago Bears ===
On April 8, 2025, Wright signed a one-year contract with the Chicago Bears.

In the first game of the 2025 regular season against the Vikings, he recorded a 74-yard interception return touchdown off J. J. McCarthy. As the season progressed, Wright saw increased action due to injuries at cornerback. He recovered a fumbled handoff in Week 6 that led to the Bears' game-winning drive to beat the Washington Commanders, followed by intercepting the New Orleans Saints' Spencer Rattler a week later. In Week 9 against the Cincinnati Bengals, Wright was beaten by Tee Higgins for two touchdowns in the first half, including a 44-yard score in which Higgins caught a pass over Wright along the sideline; despite the struggles, Wright intercepted Joe Flacco's Hail Mary pass to secure the Bears' 47–42 victory. Wright also dropped two potential interceptions in Week 10, but recovered a late fumble by New York Giants quarterback Jaxson Dart to help Chicago win. He intercepted McCarthy again in the second meeting with Minnesota, which he dedicated to late Laney College head coach John Beam. Wright was responsible for stopping the Eagles' infamous Tush Push in Week 13 when he ripped the ball from Jalen Hurts, leading to Philadelphia's first turnover of the season when they ran the play. He was named NFC Defensive Player of the Month for November.

Wright ended the 2025 season with a league-leading eight takeaways, consisting of five interceptions and three fumble recoveries. He also forced two fumbles and broke up 11 passes. After Eagles cornerback Quinyon Mitchell withdrew due to injury, Wright was named an alternate for the 2026 Pro Bowl Games.

=== New York Jets ===
On March 12, 2026, the New York Jets signed Wright to a one-year, $5.5 million contract.

== NFL career statistics ==
Legend
**Bold**	Career high

=== Regular season ===
Year	Team	Games		Tackles					Interceptions						Fumbles				
Year	Team	GP	GS	Cmb	Solo	Ast	Sck	TFL	Int	Yds	Avg	Lng	TD	PD	FF	Fmb	FR	Yds	TD
2021	DAL	13	1	9	7	2	0.0	0	0	0	0.0	0	0	0	0	**1**	0	0	0
2022	DAL	7	2	23	17	6	0.0	1	1	0	0.0	0	0	4	0	0	0	0	0
2023	DAL	12	0	5	3	2	0.0	0	0	0	0.0	0	0	1	0	0	0	0	0
2024	MIN	1	0	0	0	0	0.0	0	0	0	0.0	0	0	0	0	0	0	0	0
2025	CHI	17	16	**80**	**54**	**26**	0.0	**3**	**5**	**118**	**23.6**	**74**	**1**	**11**	**2**	0	**3**	**-1**	0
2026	NYJ	4	0	1	1	1	0.0	0	0	0	0.0	0	0	0	0	0	0	0	0
Career		54	19	118	82	36	0.0	4	6	118	19.7	74	1	16	2	1	3	-1	0

=== Postseason ===
Year	Team	Games		Tackles					Interceptions						Fumbles				
Year	Team	GP	GS	Cmb	Solo	Ast	Sck	TFL	Int	Yds	Avg	Lng	TD	PD	FF	Fmb	FR	Yds	TD
2023	DAL	1	0	0	0	0	0.0	0	0	0	0.0	0	0	0	0	0	0	0	0
2025	CHI	2	2	**6**	**3**	**3**	0.0	0	0	0	0.0	0	0	**1**	0	0	0	0	0
Career		3	2	6	3	3	0.0	0	0	0	0.0	0	0	1	0	0	0	0	0

== Personal life ==
His younger brother Rejzohn was featured in the 2020 season of the series Last Chance U, and currently plays cornerback for the New Orleans Saints. His cousin, Mekhi Blackmon, plays cornerback for the Indianapolis Colts. Another cousin, Bump Cooper Jr., played cornerback for the Baltimore Ravens.
