= 2005 Dallas Cowboys season =

NFL team season

- Owner: Jerry Jones
- General manager: Jerry Jones
- Head coach: Bill Parcells
- Home stadium: Texas Stadium

Results
- Record: 9–7
- Division place: 3rd NFC East
- Playoffs: Did not qualify
- Pro Bowlers: 4: Larry Allen G; La'Roi Glover DT; Roy Williams S; Jason Witten TE

Uniform
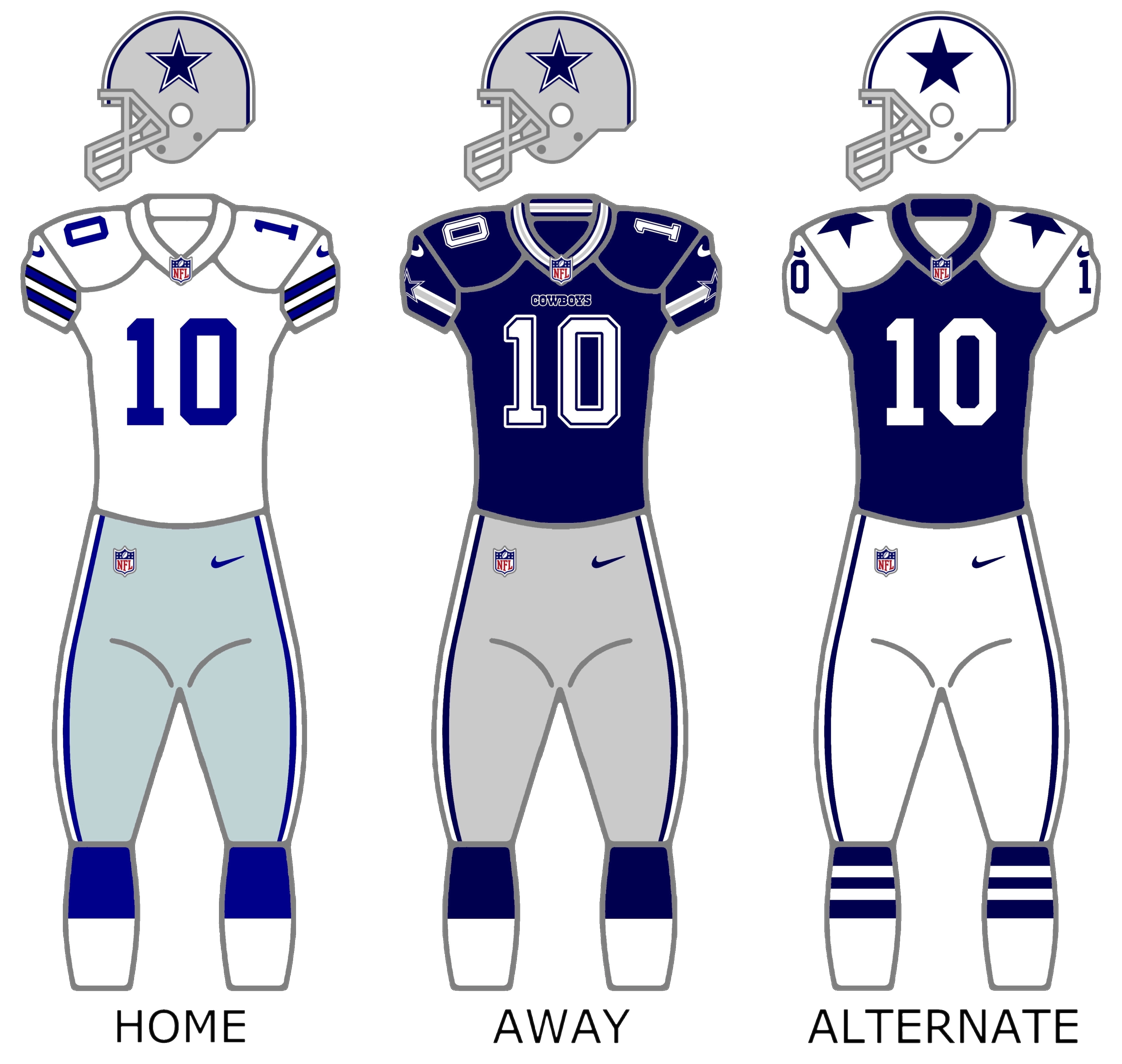

The 2005 season was the Dallas Cowboys' 46th in the National Football League (NFL), their 17th under the ownership of Jerry Jones, their 34th playing their home games at Texas Stadium, and their third season under head coach Bill Parcells. Despite the Cowboys being 7–3 by Week 11 and tying the Giants for first in the NFC East, the Cowboys suffered a season collapse going 2–4 during the last six games. The Cowboys missed the playoffs for the second consecutive season after the Washington Redskins beat the Philadelphia Eagles. However, the Cowboys were able to improve on their 6–10 record from last season and finished the season at 9–7.

== Offseason ==
During the 2005 offseason, the team found a temporary solution to the quarterback situation by signing former Buffalo Bills quarterback Drew Bledsoe. Earlier in his career, Bledsoe played for Bill Parcells while he was the coach for the New England Patriots. The Cowboys also signed cornerbacks Aaron Glenn and Anthony Henry.

Also, during free agency, the Cowboys signed former Green Bay Packers guard Marco Rivera, Wide Receiver Peerless Price from the Atlanta Falcons eventually being released late in the season, and former New York Jets defensive tackle Jason Ferguson.

The Cowboys also lost their last remaining three-time Super Bowl champion when Darren Woodson announced his retirement just before the offseason began.

The Cowboys installed a 3–4 defensive scheme, marking the first departure from the 4–3 defense since the club was founded in 1960. In their first year in the new system the team finished tenth in the NFL in total defense and opponents completed just 54.7 percent of their passes against the Cowboys’ secondary, the second-lowest number in the NFL that year.

Additions	Subtractions
QB Drew Bledsoe (Bills)	QB Vinny Testaverde (Jets)
G Marco Rivera (Packers)	LB Dexter Coakley (Rams)
CB Aaron Glenn (Texans)	DE Marcellus Wiley (Jaguars)
CB Anthony Henry (Browns)	LS Jeff Robinson (Rams)
DT Jason Ferguson (Jets)	WR Quincy Morgan (Steelers)
WR Peerless Price (Falcons)	

=== Draft class ===
2005 Dallas Cowboys draft
Round	Pick	Player	Position	College	Notes
1	11	DeMarcus Ware * ^{†}	LB	Troy	
1	20	Marcus Spears	DE	LSU	
2	42	Kevin Burnett	LB	Tennessee	
4	109	Marion Barber *	RB	Minnesota	
4	132	Chris Canty	DE	Virginia	
6	208	Justin Beriault	S	Ball State	compensatory
6	209	Rob Pettiti	OT	Pittsburgh	compensatory
7	224	Jay Ratliff *	DT	Auburn	
Made roster † Pro Football Hall of Fame * Made at least one Pro Bowl during career

Notes

- The Cowboys traded their 2004 first-round (No. 22 overall) selection to the Buffalo Bills in exchange for 2004 second (No. 43 overall) and fifth-round (No. 144 overall) selections, and a 2005 first-round (No. 20 overall) selection.
- The Cowboys traded their 2005 third-round (No. 73 overall) selection to the Houston Texans in exchange for rights to quarterback Drew Henson.
- The Cowboys traded their 2005 fifth-round (No. 146 overall) and 2006 fourth-round (No. 116 overall) selections to the Philadelphia Eagles for 2005 fourth-round (No. 132 overall) selection and 2006 sixth-round (No. 182 overall) selections.
- The Cowboys traded their 2004 seventh-round (No. 223 overall) and 2005 sixth-round (No. 185 overall) selections to the Oakland Raiders for defensive tackle Kenyon Coleman.

=== Undrafted free agents ===
2005 undrafted free agents of note
Player	Position	College
Jon Condo	Linebacker	Maryland
Roger Cooper	Linebacker	Montana State
Tony Curtis	Tight end	Portland State
Mike Goolsby	Linebacker	Notre Dame
Reggie Harrel	Wide receiver	TCU
Thomas Johnson	Defensive tackle	Middle Tennessee State
Reggie Lowe	Linebacker	Duke
Jamaica Rector	Wide receiver	Northwest Missouri State
Matthew Tarullo	Guard/Center	Syracuse
Tyson Thompson	Running back	San Jose State
Chris Van Hoy	Defensive tackle	Louisiana Tech
Brett Visintainer	Kicker	Fresno State
Sam Wilder	Tackle	Colorado

== Staff ==
Dallas Cowboys 2005 staff
Front office: Owner/general manager – Jerry Jones; Executive vp – Stephen Jones; Head coaches: Head coach – Bill Parcells; Assistant head coach/passing game coordinator – Sean Payton; Offensive coaches: Quarterbacks – David Lee; Running backs – Anthony Lynn; Wide receivers – Todd Haley; Tight ends – Paul Pasqualoni; Offensive line/running game coordinator – Tony Sparano	Defensive coaches: Defensive coordinator – Mike Zimmer; Defensive line – Kacy Rodgers; Linebackers – Gary Gibbs; Secondary – Todd Bowles; Assistant secondary – Mike MacIntyre; Special teams coaches: Special teams – Bruce DeHaven; Strength and conditioning: Strength and conditioning – Joe Juraszek

== Roster ==
Dallas Cowboys 2005 roster
Quarterbacks: 11 Drew Bledsoe; 7 Drew Henson; 9 Tony Romo; Running backs: 24 Marion Barber; 21 Julius Jones; 39 Lousaka Polite FB; 28 Tyson Thompson; Wide receivers: 18 Terrance Copper; 84 Patrick Crayton; 83 Terry Glenn; 19 Keyshawn Johnson; Tight ends: 86 Dan Campbell; 80 Sean Ryan; 82 Jason Witten	Offensive linemen: 73 Larry Allen G; 75 Marc Colombo OT; 65 Andre Gurode C; 52 Al Johnson C; 72 Stephen Peterman G; 79 Rob Petitti OT; 70 Marcus Price G/OT; 71 Cory Procter C; 62 Marco Rivera G; 77 Torrin Tucker OT; Defensive linemen: 99 Chris Canty DE; 93 Kenyon Coleman DE; 98 Greg Ellis DE; 95 Jason Ferguson NT; 97 La'Roi Glover NT; 92 Thomas Johnson DE; 90 Eric Ogbogu DE; 96 Marcus Spears DE	Linebackers: 54 Quinton Caver OLB; 78 Junior Glymph OLB; 55 Ryan Fowler ILB; 50 Scott Fujita OLB; 56 Bradie James ILB; 68 Vontrell Jamison OLB; 58 Scott Shanle ILB; 94 DeMarcus Ware OLB; Defensive backs: 29 Keith Davis FS; 25 Tony Dixon SS; 26 Aaron Glenn CB; 42 Anthony Henry CB; 33 Nate Jones CB; 41 Terence Newman CB; 20 Willie Pile FS; 35 Jacques Reeves CB; 38 Lynn Scott SS; 31 Roy Williams SS; Special teams: 4 Shaun Suisham K; 91 L. P. Ladouceur LS; 1 Mat McBriar P	Reserve lists: 76 Flozell Adams OT (IR); 48 Micheal Barrow ILB (IR); 40 Justin Beriault S (IR); 57 Kevin Burnett OLB (IR); 59 Dat Nguyen ILB (IR); 37 Derek Pagel S (IR); 88 Brett Pierce TE (IR); 66 Jay Ratliff NT (IR); -- Jacob Rogers OT (IR); 51 Al Singleton ILB (IR); 53 Kalen Thornton ILB (IR); -- Brett Visintainer K (IR); Practice squad: 15 Tom Crowder S; 89 Tony Curtis TE; 27 Keylon Kincade RB; 85 Jamaica Rector WR; 64 Shannon Snell G; 61 Matt Tarullo C; 87 J. R. Tolver WR; 23 Lenny Williams CB; rookies in italics 53 active, 12 inactive, 8 practice squad

== Preseason ==
=== Schedule ===
Week	Date	Opponent	Result	Record	Venue	Recap
1	August 13	at Arizona Cardinals	L 11–13	0–1	Sun Devil Stadium	Recap
2	August 22	at Seattle Seahawks	W 18–10	1–1	Qwest Field	Recap
3	August 27	Houston Texans	W 21–9	2–1	Texas Stadium	Recap
4	September 1	Jacksonville Jaguars	W 27–20	3–1	Texas Stadium	Recap

== Regular season ==
=== Schedule ===
Week	Date	Opponent	Result	Record	Venue	Recap
1	September 11	at San Diego Chargers	W 28–24	1–0	Qualcomm Stadium	Recap
2	September 19	Washington Redskins	L 13–14	1–1	Texas Stadium	Recap
3	September 25	at San Francisco 49ers	W 34–31	2–1	Monster Park	Recap
4	October 2	at Oakland Raiders	L 13–19	2–2	McAfee Coliseum	Recap
5	October 9	Philadelphia Eagles	W 33–10	3–2	Texas Stadium	Recap
6	October 16	New York Giants	W 16–13 (OT)	4–2	Texas Stadium	Recap
7	October 23	at Seattle Seahawks	L 10–13	4–3	Qwest Field	Recap
8	October 30	Arizona Cardinals	W 34–13	5–3	Texas Stadium	Recap
9	Bye					
10	November 14	at Philadelphia Eagles	W 21–20	6–3	Lincoln Financial Field	Recap
11	November 20	Detroit Lions	W 20–7	7–3	Texas Stadium	Recap
12	November 24	Denver Broncos	L 21–24 (OT)	7–4	Texas Stadium	Recap
13	December 4	at New York Giants	L 10–17	7–5	Giants Stadium	Recap
14	December 11	Kansas City Chiefs	W 31–28	8–5	Texas Stadium	Recap
15	December 18	at Washington Redskins	L 7–35	8–6	FedExField	Recap
16	December 24	at Carolina Panthers	W 24–20	9–6	Bank of America Stadium	Recap
17	January 1	St. Louis Rams	L 10–20	9–7	Texas Stadium	Recap

=== Game summaries ===
==== Week 1: at San Diego Chargers ====
Week 1: Dallas Cowboys at San Diego Chargers – Game summary

Quarter	1	2	3	4	Total
Cowboys	0	14	7	7	28
Chargers	7	7	10	0	24

at Qualcomm Stadium, San Diego, California

- Game time: 3:15 p.m. CDT/1:15 p.m. PDT
- Game weather: 67 °F (19 °C), Clear and Sunny
- Game attendance: 67,679
- TV announcers (FOX): Joe Buck, Troy Aikman and Patrick O'Neal
- Summary, Game Book

Game information

First quarter

- SD – LaDainian Tomlinson 2-yard run (Nate Kaeding kick), 6:53. Chargers 7–0. Drive: 11 plays, 67 yards, 5:08.

Second quarter

- DAL – Patrick Crayton 20-yard pass from Drew Bledsoe (Jose Cortez kick), 13:34. Tied 7–7. Drive: 9 plays, 80 yards, 4:36.
- DAL – Keyshawn Johnson 13-yard pass from Drew Bledsoe (Jose Cortez kick), 9:46. Cowboys 14–7. Drive: 5 plays, 34 yards, 2:47.
- SD – Keenan McCardell 20-yard pass from Drew Brees (Nate Kaeding kick), 2:07. Tied 14–14. Drive: 14 plays, 68 yards, 7:39.

Third quarter

- SD – Keenan McCardell 17-yard pass from Drew Brees (Nate Kaeding kick), 10:31. Chargers 21–14. Drive: 8 plays, 51 yards, 4:29.
- DAL – Julius Jones 5-yard run (Jose Cortez kick), 5:41. Tied 21–21. Drive: 11 plays, 80 yards, 4:50.
- SD – Nate Kaeding 33-yard field goal, 0:12. Chargers 24–21. Drive: 10 plays, 33 yards, 5:29.

Fourth quarter

- DAL – Keyshawn Johnson 2-yard pass from Drew Bledsoe (Jose Cortez kick), 3:06. Cowboys 28–24. Drive: 9 plays, 44 yards, 5:26.

Top passers

- DAL – Drew Bledsoe – 18/24, 226 yards, 3 TD
- SD – Drew Brees – 18/35, 209 yards, 2 TD, 2 INT

Top rushers

- DAL – Julius Jones – 26 rushes, 93 yards, TD
- SD – LaDainian Tomlinson – 19 rushes, 72 yards, TD

Top receivers

- DAL – Patrick Crayton – 6 receptions, 89 yards, TD
- SD – Keenan McCardell – 9 receptions, 123 yards, 2 TD

After losing on opening weekend for five straight years, the Cowboys looked to end the streak on opening weekend against the San Diego Chargers. The defending AFC West Champion Chargers just had a 12–4 season and they were at home. The game was not decided until the final 30 seconds, when looking to score the game-winning touchdown on the Dallas 7-yard line, San Diego Quarterback Drew Brees threw an interception to Aaron Glenn. Both teams would go on to finish with 9–7 record. This was the Cowboys' last win against the Chargers until 2021.

==== Week 2: vs. Washington Redskins ====
Week 2: Washington Redskins at Dallas Cowboys – Game summary

Quarter	1	2	3	4	Total
Redskins	0	0	0	14	14
Cowboys	0	3	7	3	13

at Texas Stadium, Irving, Texas

- Game time: 8:00 p.m. CDT
- Game weather: 93 °F (34 °C), Clear skies
- Game attendance: 65,207
- TV announcers (ABC): Al Michaels, John Madden and Sam Ryan
- Summary, Game Book

Game information

First quarter

- No scoring plays

Second quarter

- DAL – Jose Cortez 33-yard field goal, 11:20. Cowboys 3–0. Drive: 7 plays, 16 yards, 3:30.

Third quarter

- DAL – Terry Glenn 70-yard pass from Drew Bledsoe (Jose Cortez kick), 12:51. Cowboys 10–0. Drive: 1 play, 60 yards, 0:35.

Fourth quarter

- DAL – Jose Cortez 41-yard field goal, 5:58. Cowboys 13–0. Drive: 9 plays, 53 yards, 6:27.
- WSH – Santana Moss 39-yard pass from Mark Brunell (Nick Novak kick), 3:46. Cowboys 13–7. Drive: 10 plays, 76 yards, 2:12.
- WSH – Santana Moss 70-yard pass from Mark Brunell (Nick Novak kick) 2:35. Redskins 14–13. Drive: 2 plays, 80 yards, 0:17.

Top passers

- WSH – Mark Brunell – 20/34, 291 yards, 2 TD, INT
- DAL – Drew Bledsoe – 21/36, 261 yards, TD

Top rushers

- WSH – Clinton Portis – 17 rushes, 52 yards
- DAL – Julius Jones – 22 rushes, 81 yards

Top receivers

- WSH – Santana Moss – 5 receptions, 159 yards, 2 TD
- DAL – Terry Glenn – 6 receptions, 157 yards, TD

Going into the game, the Dallas Cowboys had won 14 of the last 15 meetings between the two teams. After holding a 13–0 lead with 3:46 remaining in the fourth quarter, the Redskins came out with an extremely improbable rally late in the fourth quarter to stun the Cowboys 14–13 when Mark Brunell threw two touchdown passes to Santana Moss. It was the first time (after 77 times) that Coach Parcells lost after going into the fourth quarter with at least a 13-point lead. The Redskins had won in Texas Stadium for the first time in a decade.

==== Week 3: at San Francisco 49ers ====
Week 3: Dallas Cowboys at San Francisco 49ers – Game summary

Quarter	1	2	3	4	Total
Cowboys	0	12	7	15	34
49ers	7	17	7	0	31

at Monster Park, San Francisco, California

- Game time: 3:05 p.m. CDT/1:05 p.m. PDT
- Game weather: 72 °F (22 °C), Sunny
- Game attendance: 68,247
- TV announcers (FOX): Dick Stockton, Daryl Johnston and Tony Siragusa
- Summary, Game Book

Game information

First quarter

- SF – Arnaz Battle, 15-yard pass from Tim Rattay (Joe Nedney kick) 3:29. 49ers 7–0. Drive: 11 plays, 80 yards, 6:59.

Second quarter

- DAL – Drew Bledsoe 6-yard run (kick failed, wide left), 8:46. 49ers 7–6. Drive: 14 plays, 92 yards, 7:21.
- SF – Brandon Lloyd, 89-yard pass from Tim Rattay (Joe Nedney kick), 7:43. 49ers 14–6. Drive: 2 plays, 80 yards, 1:03.
- SF – Tony Parrish 34-yard interception return (Joe Nedney kick), 6:42. 49ers 21–6.
- DAL – Jason Witten, 6-yard pass from Drew Bledsoe (pass failed), 3:33. 49ers 21–12. Drive: 6 plays, 84 yards, 3:09.
- SF – Joe Nedney 20-yard field goal, 0:15. 49ers 24–12. Drive: 13 plays, 69 yards, 3:18.

Third quarter

- DAL – Julius Jones 1-yard run (Jose Cortez kick), 9:24. 49ers 24–19. Drive: 10 plays, 55 yards, 4:39.
- SF – Brandon Lloyd, 13-yard pass from Tim Rattay (Joe Nedney kick), 0:40. 49ers 31–19. Drive: 4 plays, 34 yards, 1:23.

Fourth quarter

- DAL – Julius Jones 1-yard run (Jose Cortez kick), 14:51. 49ers 31–26. Drive: 4 plays, 72 yards, 0:49.
- DAL – Keyshawn Johnson, 14-yard pass from Drew Bledsoe (Drew Bledsoe–Keyshawn Johnson pass), 1:51. Cowboys 34–31. Drive: 8 plays, 76 yards, 4:14.

Top passers

- DAL – Drew Bledsoe – 24/38, 363 yards, 2 TD, 2 INT
- SF – Tim Rattay – 21/34, 269 yards, 3 TD, 2 INT

Top rushers

- DAL – Julius Jones – 26 rushes, 85 yards, 2 TD
- SF – Kevan Barlow – 12 rushes, 65 yards

Top receivers

- DAL – Terry Glenn – 5 receptions, 137 yards
- SF – Brandon Lloyd – 4 receptions, 142 yards, 2 TD

The Dallas Cowboys did the exact opposite of what they did a week earlier by scoring 15 unanswered point in the fourth quarter to shock the 49ers 34–31, in a game that was decided with less than 2 minutes remaining.

==== Week 4: at Oakland Raiders ====
Week 4: Dallas Cowboys at Oakland Raiders – Game summary

Quarter	1	2	3	4	Total
Cowboys	0	3	3	7	13
Raiders	10	0	3	6	19

at McAfee Coliseum, Oakland, California

- Game time: 3:15 p.m. CDT/1:15 p.m. PDT
- Game weather: 66 °F (19 °C), Sunny
- Game attendance: 62,400
- TV announcers (FOX): Dick Stockton, Daryl Johnston and Tony Siragusa
- Summary, Game Book

Game information

First quarter

- OAK – Sebastian Janikowski 30-yard field goal, 7:22. Raiders 3–0. Drive: 6 plays, 79 yards, 2:54.
- OAK – LaMont Jordan 2-yard run (Sebastian Janikowski kick), 3:07. Raiders 10–0. Drive: 6 plays, 36 yards, 2:38.

Second quarter

- DAL – Jose Cortez 29-yard field goal, 5:59. Raiders 10–3. Drive: 11 plays, 69 yards, 6:32.

Third quarter

- OAK – Sebastian Janikowski 23-yard field goal, 8:15. Raiders 13–3. Drive: 13 plays, 75 yards, 6:45.
- DAL – Jose Cortez 30-yard field goal, 1:05. Raiders 13–6. Drive: 13 plays, 48 yards, 7:10.

Fourth quarter

- OAK – Sebastian Janikowski 49-yard field goal, 10:25. Raiders 16–6. Drive: 5 plays, 23 yards, 1:57.
- DAL – Patrick Crayton, 63-yard pass from Drew Bledsoe (Jose Cortez kick), 8:51. Raiders 16–13. Drive: 3 plays, 80 yards, 1:34.
- OAK – Sebastian Janikowski 43-yard field goal, 4:29. Raiders 19–13. Drive: 10 plays, 41 yards, 4:22.

Top passers

- DAL – Drew Bledsoe – 11/26, 212 yards, TD, INT
- OAK – Kerry Collins – 13/23, 218 yards

Top rushers

- DAL – Julius Jones – 22 rushes, 76 yards
- OAK – LaMont Jordan – 26 rushes, 126 yards, TD

Top receivers

- DAL – Jason Witten – 5 receptions, 49 yards
- OAK – Randy Moss – 4 receptions, 123 yards

Despite staying in the Bay area over the week to prepare for the game against the Raiders game, the Cowboys were unable to take advantage of the winless Oakland Raiders, and failed to score on a potential game saving drive late in the fourth quarter.

==== Week 5: vs. Philadelphia Eagles ====
Week 5: Philadelphia Eagles at Dallas Cowboys – Game summary

Quarter	1	2	3	4	Total
Eagles	0	3	7	0	10
Cowboys	17	10	3	3	33

at Texas Stadium, Irving, Texas

- Game time: 3:15 p.m. CDT
- Game weather: 77 °F (25 °C), Clear skies
- Game attendance: 63,199
- TV announcers (FOX): Joe Buck, Troy Aikman and Pam Oliver
- Summary, Game Book

Game information

First quarter

- DAL – Terry Glenn, 15-yard pass from Drew Bledsoe (Jose Cortez kick), 13:01. Cowboys 7–0. Drive: 4 plays, 51 yards, 1:59.
- DAL – Terry Glenn, 38-yard pass from Drew Bledsoe (Jose Cortez kick), 7:41. Cowboys 14–0. Drive: 1 play, 38 yards, 0:07.
- DAL – Jose Cortez 28-yard field goal, 0:19. Cowboys 17–0. Drive: 9 plays, 40 yards, 5:18.

Second quarter

- PHI – Todd France 23-yard field goal, 10:23. Cowboys 17–3. Drive: 10 plays, 71 yards, 4:56.
- DAL – Lousaka Polite, 12-yard pass from Drew Bledsoe (Jose Cortez kick), 5:22. Cowboys 24–3. Drive: 11 plays, 70 yards, 5:01.
- DAL – Jose Cortez 33-yard field goal, 0:09. Cowboys 27–3. Drive: 13 plays, 80 yards, 2:34.

Third quarter

- DAL – Jose Cortez 37-yard field goal, 11:39. Cowboys 30–3. Drive: 7 plays, 26 yards, 2:07.
- PHI – Sheldon Brown 80-yard fumble return (Todd France kick) 1:12. Cowboys 30–10.

Fourth quarter

- DAL– Jose Cortez 45-yard field goal, 4:39. Cowboys 33–10. Drive: 13 plays, 52 yards, 9:11.

Top passers

- PHI – Donovan McNabb – 13/26, 131 yards
- DAL – Drew Bledsoe – 24/35, 289 yards, 3 TD

Top rushers

- PHI – Brian Westbrook – 6 rushes, 12 yards
- DAL – Tyson Thompson – 20 rushes, 75 yards

Top receivers

- PHI – Terrell Owens – 5 receptions, 50 yards
- DAL – Terry Glenn – 7 receptions, 118 yards, 2 TD

The Cowboys exploded offensively in what Parcells said was the best performance he has seen since coming to Dallas. The Cowboys would not let the Eagles offense score a single touchdown (they had one defensive touchdown), and the Cowboys outscored the Eagles 27–3 in the first half to put the game out of reach.

==== Week 6: vs. New York Giants ====
Week 6: New York Giants at Dallas Cowboys – Game summary

Quarter	1	2	3	4	OT	Total
Giants	3	3	0	7	0	13
Cowboys	0	7	0	6	3	16

at Texas Stadium, Irving, Texas

- Game time: 12:00 p.m. CDT
- Game weather: 76 °F (24 °C), Sunny
- Game attendance: 62,278
- TV announcers (FOX): Dick Stockton, Troy Aikman and Pam Oliver
- Summary, Game Book

Game information

First quarter

- NYG – Jay Feely 50-yard field goal, 10:36. Giants 3–0. Drive: 4 plays, 7 yards, 1:39.

Second quarter

- NYG – Jay Feely 45-yard field goal, 8:42. Giants 6–0. Drive: 6 plays, 5 yards, 3:03.
- DAL – Jason Witten 2-yard pass from Drew Bledsoe (Jose Cortez kick), 0:40. Cowboys 7–6. Drive: 16 plays, 83 yards, 8:02.

Third quarter

- No scoring plays

Fourth quarter

- DAL – Jose Cortez 29-yard field goal, 12:44. Cowboys 10–6. Drive: 15 plays, 79 yards, 8:48.
- DAL – Jose Cortez 28-yard field goal, 4:40. Cowboys 13–6. Drive: 9 plays, 23 yards, 4:23.
- NYG – Jeremy Shockey 24-yard pass from Eli Manning (Jay Feely kick), 0:19. Tied 13–13. Drive: 2 plays, 52 yards, 0:33.

Overtime

- DAL – Jose Cortez 45-yard field goal, 11:13. Cowboys 16–13. Drive: 8 plays, 51 yards, 3:47.

Top passers

- NYG – Eli Manning – 14/29, 215 yards, TD, INT
- DAL – Drew Bledsoe – 26/37, 312 yards, TD, INT

Top rushers

- NYG – Tiki Barber – 14 rushes, 64 yards
- DAL – Anthony Thomas – 21 rushes, 47 yards

Top receivers

- NYG – Jeremy Shockey – 5 receptions, 129 yards, TD
- DAL – Keyshawn Johnson – 8 receptions, 120 yards

Dallas hoped to continue playing great offensively as they did in the previous week by beating the New York Giants at home. Instead, they played very sloppily and Coach Parcells said his team was "fortunate" to win. The Cowboys were sacked 4 times for a loss of 36 yards and turned over the ball 4 times.

The Cowboys lost left tackle Flozell Adams for the remainder of the season when he tore an ACL in his knee. With an immobile quarterback like Drew Bledsoe, this would be devastating for the Dallas Cowboys later in the Season because Bledsoe would be sacked 36 more times over the course of ten games (3.6 sacks per game), compared to having been sacked 13 times during the first six games (2.17 sacks per game). Bledsoe would also throw 13 more interceptions after this game (while throwing only 4 picks during the first six games).

==== Week 7: at Seattle Seahawks ====
Week 7: Dallas Cowboys at Seattle Seahawks – Game summary

Quarter	1	2	3	4	Total
Cowboys	7	0	0	3	10
Seahawks	0	3	0	10	13

at Qwest Field, Seattle, Washington

- Game time: 3:05 p.m. CDT/ 1:05 p.m, PDT
- Game weather: 55 °F (13 °C), Overcast
- Game attendance: 67,046
- TV announcers (FOX): Dick Stockton, Troy Aikman and Patrick O'Neal
- Summary, Game Book

Game information

First quarter

- DAL – Keyshawn Johnson, 5-yard pass from Drew Bledsoe (Jose Cortez kick), 1:03. Cowboys 7–0. Drive: 10 plays, 74 yards, 4:29.

Second quarter

- SEA – Josh Brown 55-yard field goal, 0:33. Cowboys 7–3. Drive: 8 plays, 23 yards, 1:10.

Third quarter

- No scoring plays

Fourth quarter

- DAL – Jose Cortez 21-yard field goal, 2:06. Cowboys 10–3. Drive: 4 plays, 9 yards, 0:58.
- SEA – Ryan Hannam 1-yard pass from Matt Hasselbeck (Josh Brown kick), 0:40. Tied 10–10. Drive: 6 plays, 81 yards, 1:26.
- SEA – Josh Brown 50-yard field goal, 0:00. Seahawks 13–10. Drive: 1 play, 0 yards, 0:05.

Top passers

- DAL – Drew Bledsoe – 13/24, 136 yards, TD, 2 INT
- SEA – Matt Hasselbeck – 23/42, 224 yards, TD, 2 INT

Top rushers

- DAL – Marion Barber – 22 rushes, 95 yards
- SEA – Shaun Alexander – 21 rushes, 61 yards

Top receivers

- DAL – Terry Glenn – 4 receptions, 35 yards
- SEA – Jerramy Stevens – 5 receptions, 60 yards

The Cowboys came to Seattle for a defensive showdown. After scoring a touchdown early in the first quarter, the Cowboys had the lead until 59 minutes and 20 second into the game when Seattle tied the game at 10–10. Trying to win with 14 seconds left in regulation, Drew Bledsoe threw an interception and Seahawks kicker Josh Brown kicked the game-winning field goal, taking their first lead of the game as time expired.

Jose Cortez missed a field goal which cost Dallas the game, and he was fired after the game. Ryan Hannam, who scored a game-tying touchdown late in the fourth quarter signed with the Dallas Cowboys as a free agent the following season.

==== Week 8: vs. Arizona Cardinals ====
Week 8: Arizona Cardinals at Dallas Cowboys – Game summary

Quarter	1	2	3	4	Total
Cardinals	3	7	3	0	13
Cowboys	10	14	3	7	34

at Texas Stadium, Irving, Texas

- Game time: 12:00 p.m. CST
- Game weather: 71 °F (22 °C), Sunny
- Game attendance: 62,068
- TV announcers (FOX): Matt Vasgersian, Brian Baldinger and Mike Doccy
- Summary, Game Book

Game information

First quarter

- ARZ – Neil Rackers 52-yard field goal, 9:43. Cardinals 3–0. Drive: 10 plays, 43 yards, 5:17.
- DAL – Marion Barber 28-yard run (Shaun Suisham kick), 8:36. Cowboys 7–3. Drive: 3 plays, 80 yards, 1:07.
- DAL – Shaun Suisham 21-yard field goal, 2:57. Cowboys 10–3. Drive: 10 plays, 54 yards, 4:40.

Second quarter

- ARZ – Anquan Boldin, 44-yard pass from Josh McCown (Neil Rackers kick), 12:53. Tied 10–10. Drive: 11 plays, 77 yards, 5:04.
- DAL – Keyshawn Johnson, 5-yard pass from Drew Bledsoe (Shaun Suisham kick), 3:11. Cowboys 17–10. Drive: 11 plays, 75 yards, 6:28.
- DAL – Marion Barber 10-yard run (Shaun Suisham kick), 1:00. Cowboys 24–10. Drive: 6 plays, 59 yards, 1:03.

Third quarter

- ARZ – Neil Rackers 47-yard field goal, 11:13. Cowboys 24–13. Drive: 4 plays, 9 yards, 2:02.
- DAL – Shaun Suisham 21-yard field goal, 3:03. Cowboys 27–13. Drive: 14 plays, 68 yards, 8:10.

Fourth quarter

- DAL – Anthony Henry 58-yard interception return (Shaun Suisham kick), 11:54. Cowboys 34–13.

Top passers

- ARZ – Josh McCown – 16/33, 161 yards, TD, 2 INT
- DAL – Drew Bledsoe – 19/24, 220 yards, TD

Top rushers

- ARZ – Marcel Shipp – 12 rushes, 44 yards
- DAL – Marion Barber – 27 rushes, 127 yards, 2 TD

Top receivers

- ARZ – Anquan Boldin – 3 receptions, 69 yards, TD
- DAL – Keyshawn Johnson – 6 receptions, 54 yards, TD

The Dallas Cowboys bounced back from a loss a week earlier and routed the Arizona Cardinals. The Cowboys had a new kicker on their roster, rookie Shaun Suisham, and another rookie making his first start was Marion Barber, who was starting in place of injured Julius Jones. He ran for 127 yards and scored two touchdowns in his breakout game.

==== Week 10: at Philadelphia Eagles ====
Week 10: Dallas Cowboys at Philadelphia Eagles – Game summary

Quarter	1	2	3	4	Total
Cowboys	7	0	0	14	21
Eagles	7	7	3	3	20

at Lincoln Financial Field, Philadelphia, Pennsylvania

- Game time: 9:00 p.m. EST/ 8:00 p.m. CST
- Game weather: 54 °F (12 °C), Cloudy
- Game attendance: 67,739
- TV announcers (ABC): Al Michaels, John Madden and Sam Ryan
- Summary, Game Book

Game information

First quarter

- PHI – Brian Westbrook 15-yard run (David Akers kick), 8:54. Eagles 7–0. Drive: 11 plays, 72 yards, 6:06.
- DAL – Marion Barber 1-yard run (Shaun Suisham kick), 0:55. Tied 7–7. Drive: 7 plays, 72 yards, 3:52.

Second quarter

- PHI – Donovan McNabb 2-yard run (David Akers kick), 1:47. Eagles 14–7. Drive: 4 plays, 19 yards, 1:04.

Third quarter

- PHI – David Akers 48-yard field goal, 8:06. Eagles 17–7. Drive: 8 plays, 45 yards, 3:15.

Fourth quarter

- PHI – David Akers 20-yard field goal, 9:12. Eagles 20–7. Drive: 11 plays, 68 yards, 4:46.
- DAL – Terry Glenn 20-yard pass from Drew Bledsoe (Shaun Suisham kick), 3:04. Eagles 20–14. Drive: 4 plays, 72 yards, 0:40.
- DAL – Roy Williams interception return (Shaun Suisham kick), 2:43. Cowboys 21–20.

Top passers

- DAL – Drew Bledsoe – 17/24, 196 yards, TD, INT
- PHI – Donovan McNabb – 19/34, 169 yards, INT

Top rushers

- DAL – Marion Barber – 13 rushes, 46 yards, TD
- PHI – Brian Westbrook – 16 rushes, 86 yards, TD

Top receivers

- DAL – Keyshawn Johnson – 5 receptions, 56 yards
- PHI – L. J. Smith – 6 receptions, 56 yards

The Cowboys came to Philadelphia hoping to sweep the Eagles for the first time since 1998 and beat them at Philadelphia for the first time since 1998. After trailing by 13 points late in the fourth quarter, the Cowboys stunned the Eagles by scoring two touchdowns (one of which was an interception return) to win the game 21–20. Also, Donovan McNabb injured his knee, and he would leave for the remainder of the season.

This was the last Cowboys game to air on ABC as the network's relationship with the NFL ended after the 2005 season.

==== Week 11: vs. Detroit Lions ====
Week 11: Detroit Lions at Dallas Cowboys – Game summary

Quarter	1	2	3	4	Total
Lions	0	7	0	0	7
Cowboys	7	6	7	0	20

at Texas Stadium, Irving, Texas

- Game time: 12:00 p.m. CST
- Game weather: 57 °F (14 °C), Sunny
- Game attendance: 62,670
- TV announcers (FOX): Dick Stockton, Daryl Johnston and Tony Siragusa
- Summary, Game Book

Game information

First quarter

- DAL – Marion Barber 6-yard run (Billy Cundiff kick), 6:58. Cowboys 7–0. Drive: 14 plays, 84 yards, 8:02.

Second quarter

- DAL – Billy Cundiff 19-yard field goal, 6:39. Cowboys 10–0. Drive: 13 plays, 89 yards, 6:43.
- DET – Kevin Jones 2-yard run (Jason Hanson kick), 2:49. Cowboys 10–7. Drive: 8 plays, 78 yards, 3:50.
- DAL – Billy Cundiff 56-yard field goal, 0:03. Cowboys 13–7. Drive: 5 plays, 4 yards, 0:35.

Third quarter

- DAL – Marion Barber 4-yard run (Billy Cundiff kick), 2:21. Cowboys 20–7. Drive: 12 plays, 48 yards, 6:03.

Fourth quarter

- No scoring plays

Top passers

- DET – Joey Harrington – 17/25, 169 yards
- DAL – Drew Bledsoe – 12/23, 110 yards

Top rushers

- DET – Kevin Jones – 12 rushes, 29 yards, TD
- DAL – Julius Jones – 21 rushes, 92 yards

Top receivers

- DET – Roy Williams – 5 receptions, 72 yards
- DAL – Keyshawn Johnson – 5 receptions, 37 yards

Earlier in the week, Coach Parcells hung mousetraps in the locker room to warn his players that this game was a "trap game". Dallas rushed for 149 yards and 2 touchdowns, and kicker Billy Cundiff kicked a franchise record 56-yard field goal. After the game, the Cowboys were 7–3 and tied for second place in the NFC. The Cowboys had already won more games than they did in the previous season.

==== Week 12: vs. Denver Broncos ====
Week 12: Denver Broncos at Dallas Cowboys – Game summary

Quarter	1	2	3	4	OT	Total
Broncos	7	7	7	0	3	24
Cowboys	7	7	0	7	0	21

at Texas Stadium, Irving, Texas

- Game time: 3:15 p.m. CST
- Game weather: 68 °F (20 °C), Sunny
- Game attendance: 63,273
- TV announcers (CBS): Jim Nantz, Phil Simms and Bonnie Bernstein
- Summary, Game Book

Game information

First quarter

- DEN – Champ Bailey 65-yard interception return (Jason Elam kick), 8:10. Broncos 7–0.
- DAL – Keyshawn Johnson, 14-yard pass from Drew Bledsoe (Billy Cundiff kick), 3:46. Tied 7–7. Drive: 9 plays, 71 yards, 4:24.

Second quarter

- DEN – Rod Smith, 20-yard pass from Jake Plummer (Jason Elam kick), 14:17. Broncos 14–7. Drive: 7 plays, 84 yards, 4:29.
- DAL – Drew Bledsoe 1-yard run (Billy Cundiff kick), 2:53. Tied 14–14. Drive: 10 plays, 69 yards, 5:28.

Third quarter

- DEN – Ron Dayne 16-yard run (Jason Elam kick), 5:47. Broncos 21–14. Drive: 11 plays, 90 yards, 6:20.

Fourth quarter

- DAL – Jason Witten 4-yard pass from Drew Bledsoe (Billy Cundiff kick), 13:36. Tied 21–21. Drive: 3 plays, 10 yards, 1:18.

Overtime

- DEN – Jason Elam 24-yard field goal, 13:39. Broncos 24–21. Drive: 3 plays, 62 yards, 1:21.

Top passers

- DEN – Jake Plummer – 15/24, 162 yards, TD, INT
- DAL – Drew Bledsoe – 29/44, 232 yards, 2 TD, 2 INT

Top rushers

- DEN – Ron Dayne – 7 rushes, 98 yards, TD
- DAL – Julius Jones – 20 rushes, 55 yards

Top receivers

- DEN – Rod Smith – 5 receptions, 57 yards, TD
- DAL – Jason Witten – 9 receptions, 82 yards, TD

In the annual Thanksgiving Day Game, the Dallas Cowboys hosted the Denver Broncos. The Cowboys offense had 314 yards, greater than Denver's 293 yards, but Cowboys kicker Billy Cundiff a missed field goal in the fourth quarter and so the game went into overtime. Denver won the coin toss and Broncos backup running back Ron Dayne ran 55 yards on the second play in overtime and Jason Elam kicked the game-winning field goal.

==== Week 13: at New York Giants ====
Week 13: Dallas Cowboys at New York Giants – Game summary

Quarter	1	2	3	4	Total
Cowboys	0	0	10	0	10
Giants	0	10	7	0	17

at Giants Stadium, East Rutherford, New Jersey

- Game time: 1:00 p.m. EST/ 12:00 p.m. CST
- Game weather: 30 °F (−1 °C) (Wind chill: 23 °F (−5 °C)), Cloudy
- Game attendance: 78,645
- TV announcers (FOX): Joe Buck, Troy Aikman and Pam Oliver
- Summary, Game Book

Game information

First quarter

- No scoring plays

Second quarter

- NYG – Brandon Jacobs 1-yard run (Jay Feely kick), 10:00. Giants 7–0. Drive: 12 plays, 73 yards, 7:01.
- NYG – Jay Feely 27-yard field goal, 1:58. Giants 10–0. Drive: 8 plays, 53 yards, 3:58.

Third quarter

- NYG – Antonio Pierce 12-yard fumble return (Jay Feely kick), 14:48. Giants 17–0.
- DAL – Billy Cundiff 34-yard field goal, 10:03. Giants 17–3. Drive: 10 plays, 54 yards, 4:45.
- DAL – Terry Glenn, 7-yard pass from Drew Bledsoe (Billy Cundiff kick), 3:52. Giants 17–10. Drive: 1 play, 7 yards, 0:05.

Fourth quarter

- No scoring plays

Top passers

- DAL – Drew Bledsoe – 15/39, 146 yards, TD, 2 INT
- NYG – Eli Manning – 12/31, 152 yards, 2 INT

Top rushers

- DAL – Julius Jones – 23 rushes, 74 yards
- NYG – Tiki Barber – 30 rushes, 115 yards

Top receivers

- DAL – Julius Jones – 9 receptions, 88 yards
- NYG – Plexico Burress – 4 receptions, 47 yards

In this season's rematch, the New York Giants made the Dallas Cowboys pay for an overtime 16–13 win earlier in the season, but both teams had a sloppy performance overall. Both teams threw two interceptions, but the Cowboys lost two fumbles. Drew Bledsoe was sacked 4 times for a loss of 21 yards, both quarterbacks completed under 40% of their passes, and both teams missed a field goal. The Giants ran for 127 yards rushing (including 115 yards by Tiki Barber) and one rushing touchdown which made the difference in the game.

==== Week 14: vs. Kansas City Chiefs ====
Week 14: Kansas City Chiefs at Dallas Cowboys – Game summary

Quarter	1	2	3	4	Total
Chiefs	7	7	7	7	28
Cowboys	0	17	0	14	31

at Texas Stadium, Irving, Texas

- Game time: 3:15 p.m. CST
- Game weather: 64 °F (18 °C), Sunny
- Game attendance: 63,432
- TV announcers (CBS): Jim Nantz, Phil Simms and Bonnie Bernstein
- Summary, Game Book

Game information

First quarter

- KC – Larry Johnson 11-yard run (Lawrence Tynes kick), 9:32. Chiefs 7–0. Drive: 6 plays, 54 yards, 2:49.

Second quarter

- DAL – Billy Cundiff 34-yard field goal, 8:00. Chiefs 7–3. Drive: 15 plays, 73 yards, 9:16.
- KC – Larry Johnson 1-yard run (Lawrence Tynes kick), 5:19. Chiefs 14–3. Drive: 5 plays, 59 yards, 2:41.
- DAL – Terry Glenn, 71-yard pass from Drew Bledsoe (Billy Cundiff kick), 3:55. Chiefs 14–10. Drive: 2 plays, 74 yards, 1:24.
- DAL – Jason Witten, 26-yard pass from Drew Bledsoe (Billy Cundiff kick), 0:40. Cowboys 17–14. Drive: 3 plays, 26 yards, 0:22.

Third quarter

- KC – Larry Johnson 21-yard run (Lawrence Tynes kick), 8:39. Chiefs 21–17. Drive: 9 plays, 88 yards, 4:48.

Fourth quarter

- DAL – Terry Glenn 6-yard run (Billy Cundiff kick), 13:07. Cowboys 24–21. Drive: 11 plays, 84 yards, 4:50.
- KC – Eddie Kennison, 47-yard pass from Trent Green (Lawrence Tynes kick), 3:55. Chiefs 28–24. Drive: 7 plays, 80 yards, 4:06.
- DAL – Dan Campbell, 1-yard pass from Drew Bledsoe (Billy Cundiff kick), 0:22. Cowboys 31–28. Drive: 14 plays, 68 yards, 3:33.

Top passers

- KC – Trent Green – 20/32, 340 yards, TD
- DAL – Drew Bledsoe – 22/34, 332 yards, 3 TD

Top rushers

- KC – Larry Johnson – 26 rushes, 143 yards, 3 TD
- DAL – Marion Barber – 15 rushes, 82 yards

Top receivers

- KC – Tony Gonzalez – 5 receptions, 94 yards
- DAL – Terry Glenn – 6 receptions, 138 yards, TD

In a back-and-forth offensive thriller, Kansas City running back Larry Johnson scored three touchdowns and Drew Bledsoe threw for three touchdowns. The Chiefs offense had 493 yards, more than the Cowboys 445 yards, but the Chiefs mistakes (including a lost fumble) made the difference in the game.

==== Week 15: at Washington Redskins ====
Week 15: Dallas Cowboys at Washington Redskins – Game summary

Quarter	1	2	3	4	Total
Cowboys	0	0	0	7	7
Redskins	7	21	7	0	35

at FedExField, Landover, Maryland

- Game time: 4:15 p.m. EST/ 3:15 p.m. CST
- Game weather: 44 °F (7 °C), Sunny
- Game attendance: 90,588
- TV announcers (FOX): Joe Buck, Troy Aikman and Pam Oliver
- Summary, Game Book

Game information

First quarter

- WSH – Chris Cooley, 8-yard pass from Mark Brunell (John Hall kick), 8:44. Redskins 7–0. Drive: 4 plays, 21 yards, 2:09.

Second quarter

- WSH – Chris Cooley, 2-yard pass from Mark Brunell (John Hall kick), 9:40. Redskins 14–0. Drive: 8 plays, 75 yards, 3:55.
- WSH – Mike Sellers, 3-yard pass from Mark Brunell (John Hall kick), 1:25. Redskins 21–0. Drive: 2 plays, 34 yards, 0:15.
- WSH – Chris Cooley, 30-yard pass from Mark Brunell (John Hall kick), 0:12. Redskins 28–0. Drive: 2 plays, 38 yards, 0:17.

Third quarter

- WSH – Ladell Betts 1-yard run (John Hall kick), 10:15. Redskins 35–0. Drive: 6 plays, 21 yards, 3:13.

Fourth quarter

- DAL – Jason Witten, 2-yard pass from Drew Bledsoe (Billy Cundiff kick), 12:10. Redskins 35–7. Drive: 8 plays, 80 yards, 4:08.

Top passers

- DAL – Drew Bledsoe – 16/29, 153 yards, TD, 3 INT
- WSH – Mark Brunell – 12/20, 163 yards, 4 TD

Top rushers

- DAL – Julius Jones – 12 rushes, 79 yards
- WSH – Clinton Portis – 23 rushes, 112 yards

Top receivers

- DAL – Jason Witten – 4 receptions, 41 yards, TD
- WSH – Chris Cooley – 6 receptions, 71 yards, 3 TD

Washington gave Bill Parcells his biggest loss ever as an NFL coach. Tight end Chris Cooley had a career day catching three touchdown passes. After being down 35–0 early in the fourth quarter, Dallas prevented a shutout by throwing a consolation touchdown pass to Jason Witten. Drew Bledsoe was sacked seven times and threw three interceptions. Only the Danny White-led Dallas 44–14 victory on September 9, 1985, had a larger margin of victory between the two teams.

==== Week 16: at Carolina Panthers ====
Week 16: Dallas Cowboys at Carolina Panthers – Game summary

Quarter	1	2	3	4	Total
Cowboys	7	3	7	7	24
Panthers	10	3	0	7	20

at Bank of America Stadium, Charlotte, North Carolina

- Game time: 1:00 p.m. EST/ 12:00 p.m. CST
- Game weather: 60 °F (16 °C), Sunny
- Game attendance: 73,436
- TV announcers (FOX): Joe Buck, Troy Aikman and Pam Oliver
- Summary, Game Book

Game information

First quarter

- CAR – John Kasay 24-yard field goal, 10:05. Panthers 3–0. Drive: 5 plays, 74 yards, 1:46.
- CAR – Drew Carter, 32-yard pass from Jake Delhomme (John Kasay kick), 9:49. Panthers 10–0. Drive: 1 play, 32 yards, 0:07.
- DAL – Julius Jones 8-yard run (Billy Cundiff kick), 7:00. Panthers 10–7. Drive: 5 plays, 80 yards, 2:49.

Second quarter

- DAL – Billy Cundiff 24-yard field goal, 11:00. Tied 10–10. Drive: 10 plays, 54 yards, 5:46.
- CAR – John Kasay 47-yard field goal, 6:50. Panthers 13–10. Drive: 8 plays, 47 yards, 4:10.

Third quarter

- DAL – Julius Jones 43-yard run (Billy Cundiff kick), 4:50. Cowboys 17–13. Drive: 5 plays, 61 yards, 2:45.

Fourth quarter

- CAR – Ricky Proehl, 35-yard pass from Jake Delhomme (John Kasay kick), 2:32. Panthers 20–17. Drive: 7 plays, 64 yards, 3:24.
- DAL – Terry Glenn, 2-yard pass from Drew Bledsoe (Billy Cundiff kick), 0:24. Cowboys 24–20. Drive: 9 plays, 58 yards, 2:08.

Top passers

- DAL – Drew Bledsoe – 15/23, 209 yards, TD, INT
- CAR – Jake Delhomme – 14/31, 260 yards, 2 TD, INT

Top rushers

- DAL – Julius Jones – 34 rushes, 194 yards, 2 TD
- CAR – DeShaun Foster – 22 rushes, 68 yards

Top receivers

- DAL – Terry Glenn – 4 receptions, 88 yards, TD
- CAR – Ricky Proehl – 2 receptions, 104 yards. TD

Going into the game, the Panthers needed a win to secure a playoff spot. The Cowboys needed a win to stay alive in the playoff race after losing three out of the last four games. Despite falling behind 0–10 early in the game, the Cowboys rallied to outscore Carolina 17–3 for almost three quarters, including two Julius Jones touchdowns. Julius Jones rushed for 194 yards, the fourth best in franchise history. Late in the fourth quarter while trailing 17–20, Billy Cundiff attempted to tie the game on a 33-yard field goal, but missed. The only reason Dallas still managed to win the game was because Carolina was penalized for "running into the kicker" (Carolina contended that they had slightly blocked the kick but replays proved inconclusive) and Terry Glenn scored a touchdown with one hand to take the lead (he dislocated his hand early in the game).

Billy Cundiff had a 32-yard field goal attempt blocked, and missed a 33-yard attempt. He already missed two field goals earlier in the season, including one that cost Dallas the game on Thanksgiving against Denver, so two days after the game he was fired by coach Parcells . Carolina won next week to secure a wildcard spot in the playoffs, but despite several likely playoff scenarios Dallas was eliminated from the playoffs before their last game when the Panthers, the Redskins, and the Giants all won a week later.

==== Week 17: vs. St. Louis Rams ====
Week 17: St. Louis Rams at Dallas Cowboys – Game summary

Quarter	1	2	3	4	Total
Rams	0	10	0	10	20
Cowboys	7	3	0	0	10

at Texas Stadium, Irving, Texas

- Game time: 7:30 p.m. CST
- Game weather: 75 °F (24 °C), Clear
- Game attendance: 63,131
- TV announcers (ESPN): Mike Patrick, Joe Theismann, Paul Maguire, Suzy Kolber
- Summary, Game Book

Game information

First quarter

- DAL – Jason Witten, 19-yard pass from Drew Bledsoe (Shaun Suisham kick), 2:36. Cowboys 7–0. Drive: 6 plays, 56 yards, 3:18.

Second quarter

- STL – Jeff Wilkins 49-yard field goal, 14:15. Cowboys 7–3. Drive: 8 plays, 40 yards, 3:21.
- STL – Aveion Cason 8-yard run (Jeff Wilkins kick) 1:52. Rams 10–7. Drive: 8 plays, 54 yards, 3:19.
- DAL – Shaun Suisham 22-yard field goal, 0:03. Tied 10–10. Drive: 10 plays, 41 yards, 1:49.

Third quarter

- No scoring plays

Fourth quarter

- STL – Arlen Harris 1-yard run (Jeff Wilkins kick), 11:57. Rams 17–10. Drive: 4 plays, 40 yards, 1:34.
- STL – Jeff Wilkins 20-yard field goal, 1:05. Rams 20–10. Drive: 4 plays, 1 yard, 1:02.

Top passers

- STL – Jamie Martin – 19/32, 158 yards
- DAL – Drew Bledsoe – 18/39, 242 yards, TD, 2 INT

Top rushers

- STL – Aveion Cason – 10 rushes, 65 yards, TD
- DAL – Julius Jones – 15 rushes, 35 yards

Top receivers

- STL – Torry Holt – 4 receptions, 40 yards
- DAL – Keyshawn Johnson – 5 receptions, 97 yards

Only minutes before the game, the Cowboys were eliminated from the playoff race when the Washington Redskins beat the Philadelphia Eagles The deflated Cowboys only managed to score 10 points against the St. Louis Rams, who came into the game 5–10. After running for a meager 35 yards, Julius Jones had 993 yards for the season, painfully just 7 yards short of 1,000 yards.

Just days after the game, head coach Bill Parcells announced he was staying for at least one more season, and his contract was extended through 2007. At the time, there had been some speculation he would be retiring.

=== Standings ===
NFC East
	W	L	T	PCT	DIV	CONF	PF	PA	STK
^{(4)} New York Giants	11	5	0	.688	4–2	8–4	422	314	W1
^{(6)} Washington Redskins	10	6	0	.625	5–1	10–2	359	293	W5
Dallas Cowboys	9	7	0	.563	3–3	7–5	325	308	L1
Philadelphia Eagles	6	10	0	.375	0–6	3–9	310	388	L2
