= Dallas Cowboys draft history =

This page is a list of the Dallas Cowboys NFL draft selections. The first draft the Cowboys participated in was 1961, in which they made defensive tackle Bob Lilly of TCU their first-ever selection.

== Key ==
= All-Pro or Pro Bowler
= MVP
= Hall of Famer

== 1961 draft ==
Round	Pick #	Overall	Name	Position	College
1	13	13	Bob Lilly	Defensive Tackle	TCU
2	2	16	E. J. Holub	Center	Texas Tech
3	2	30	Stew Barber	Offensive tackle	Penn State
4	2	44	Arnold Davis	End	Baylor
7	2	86	Art Gilmore	Back	Oregon State
8	2	100	Don Talbert	Offensive Tackle	Texas
9	2	114	Glynn Gregory	End	SMU
11	2	142	Norris Stevenson	Back	Missouri
12	2	156	Lowndes Shingler	Quarterback	Clemson
13	2	170	Don Goodman	Running Back	Florida
14	2	184	Billy Shaw	Guard	Georgia Tech
15	2	198	Julius Varnado	Offensive tackle	San Francisco State
16	2	212	Jerry Steffen	Back	Colorado
17	2	226	Everett Cloud	Back	Maryland
18	2	240	Randy Williams	Back	Indiana
19	2	254	Lynn Hoyem	Guard	Long Beach State
20	2	268	Jerry Morgan	Back	Iowa State

== 1962 draft ==
Round	Pick #	Overall	Name	Position	College
2	4	18	Sonny Gibbs	Quarterback	TCU
3	11	39	Bobby Plummer	Tackle	TCU
6	4	74	Donnie Davis	End	Southern
6	12	82	George Andrie	Defensive end	Marquette
8	4	102	Ken Tureaud	Running back	Michigan
10	4	130	John Longmeyer	Guard	Southern Illinois
11	4	144	Larry Hudas	End	Michigan State
13	4	172	Bob Moses	End	Texas
14	4	186	Harold Hays	Linebacker	Southern Miss
15	4	200	Guy Reese	Tackle	SMU
16	4	214	Bob Johnston	Tackle	Rice
17	4	228	Ray Jacobs	Tackle	Howard Payne
18	4	242	Dave Cloutier	Running Back	Maine
19	4	256	Paul Holmes	Tackle	Georgia
20	4	270	Amos Bullocks	Running Back	Southern Illinois

== 1963 draft ==
Round	Pick #	Overall	Name	Position	College
1	6	6	Lee Roy Jordan	Linebacker	Alabama
3	6	34	Jim Price	Linebacker	Auburn
4	6	48	Whaley Hall	Tackle	Ole Miss
7	6	90	Marv Clothier	Guard	Kansas
10	6	132	Rod Scheyer	Tackle	Washington
11	6	146	Ray Schoenke	Guard	SMU
12	6	160	Bill Perkins	Running back	Iowa
13	6	174	Paul Wicker	Tackle	Fresno State
14	6	188	Lou Cioci	Linebacker	Boston College
15	6	202	Jerry Overton	Defensive Back	Utah
16	6	216	Dennis Golden	Tackle	Holy Cross
17	6	230	Ernie Parks	Guard	McMurry
18	6	244	Bill Frank	Tackle	Colorado
19	6	258	Jim Stiger	Running Back	Washington
20	6	272	Tommy Lucas	End	Texas

== 1964 draft ==
Round	Pick #	Overall	Name	Position	College
1	4	4	Scott Appleton	Defensive Tackle	Texas
2	3	17	Mel Renfro	Cornerback	Oregon
4	3	43	Perry Lee Dunn	Running back	Ole Miss
6	3	73	Billy Lothridge	Quarterback	Georgia Tech
6	12	82	Jim Curry	End	Cincinnati
6	13	83	Jim Evans	End	Texas Western
7	4	88	Bob Hayes	Wide receiver	Florida A&M
8	3	101	Al Geverink	Running back	UCLA
9	4	116	Jake Kupp	Guard	Washington
10	3	129	Roger Staubach	Quarterback	Navy
11	4	144	Bob Crenshaw	Guard	Baylor
12	3	157	Johnny Norman	End	Northwestern State (LA)
13	4	172	Jerry Rhome	Quarterback	Tulsa
14	3	185	Jim Worden	Linebacker	Wittenberg
15	4	200	Bill Van Burkleo	Running Back	Tulsa
16	3	213	Paul Cercel	Center	Pittsburgh
17	4	228	Bud Abell	Linebacker	Missouri
18	3	241	Theo Viltz	Defensive Back	USC
19	4	256	H.D. Murphy	Running Back	Oregon
20	3	269	John Hughes	Linebacker	SMU

== 1965 draft ==
Round	Pick #	Overall	Name	Position	College
1	5	5	Craig Morton	Quarterback	California
2	5	19	Malcolm Walker	Center	Rice
4	5	47	Jimmy Sidle	Running back	Auburn
4	11	53	Bob Svihus	Offensive tackle	USC
5	5	61	Roger Pettee	Linebacker	Florida
6	5	75	Sonny Utz	Running Back	Virginia Tech
7	5	89	Brig Owens	Safety	Cincinnati
8	5	103	Russell Wayt	Linebacker	Rice
9	5	117	Jim Zanios	Running Back	Texas Tech
10	5	131	Gaylon McCullough	Center	Alabama
11	5	145	Jethro Pugh	Defensive Tackle	Elizabeth City State
12	5	159	Ernie Kellermann	Safety	Miami (OH)
13	5	173	Jack Schraub	End	California
14	5	187	Garry Porterfield	Wide receiver	Tulsa
15	5	201	Gene Foster	Running Back	Arizona State
16	5	215	Doug McDougal	End	Oregon State
17	5	229	Mitch Johnson	Offensive Tackle	UCLA
18	5	243	Marty Amsler	Offensive Tackle	Evansville
19	5	257	Merv Rettenmund	Running Back	Ball State
20	5	271	Don Barlow	Offensive Tackle	Kansas State

== 1966 draft ==
Round	Pick #	Overall	Name	Position	College
1	5	5	John Niland	Guard	Iowa
2	6	22	Willie Townes	Offensive tackle	Tulsa
5	15	79	Walt Garrison	Fullback	Oklahoma State
6	6	86	Bob Dunlevy	Wide receiver	West Virginia
7	5	100	Arthur Robinson	Wide Receiver	Florida A&M
8	6	116	Don Kunit	Running back	Penn State
9	5	130	Darrell Elam	Wide Receiver	West Virginia Tech
10	6	146	Mason Mitchell	Running Back	Washington
11	5	160	Austin Denney	Wide Receiver	Tennessee
12	3	173	Les Shy	Defensive Back	Long Beach State
12	6	176	Craig Baynham	Running Back	Georgia Tech
13	5	190	Ron Lamb	Running Back	South Carolina
14	6	206	Lewis Turner	Running Back	Norfolk State
15	5	220	Mark Gartung	Offensive tackle	Oregon State
16	6	236	Tom Piggee	Running Back	San Francisco State
17	5	250	George Allen	Offensive Tackle	West Texas State
18	6	266	Steve Orr	Offensive Tackle	Washington
19	5	280	Byron Johnson	Offensive Tackle	Central Washington
20	6	296	Lou Hudson	Wide Receiver	Minnesota

== 1967 draft ==
Round	Pick #	Overall	Name	Position	College
3	23	76	Phil Clark	Defensive Back	Northwestern
4	23	103	Curtis Marker	Guard	Northern Michigan
6	24	157	Sims Stokes	Wide receiver	Northern Arizona
7	23	182	Rayfield Wright	Offensive tackle	Fort Valley State
8	23	208	Steve Laub	Quarterback	Illinois Wesleyan
9	23	234	Byron Morgan	Defensive Back	Findlay
10	23	260	Eugene Bowen	Running back	Tennessee A&I
11	22	285	Pat Riley	Wide Receiver	Kentucky
12	22	312	Harold Deters	Kicker	North Carolina State
13	23	338	Al Kerkian	Defensive end	Akron
14	23	364	Tommy Boyd	Guard	Tarleton State
15	23	390	Leavie David	Defensive Back	Edward Waters
16	23	416	Paul Brothers	Quarterback	Oregon State
17	23	442	George Adams	Linebacker	Morehead State

== 1968 draft ==
Round	Pick #	Overall	Name	Position	College
1	20	20	Dennis Homan	Wide receiver	Alabama
2	18	45	Dave McDaniels	Wide Receiver	Mississippi Valley State
3	16	71	Ed Harmon	Linebacker	Louisville
4	14	97	John Douglas	Linebacker	Missouri
5	19	130	Blaine Nye	Guard	Stanford
6	21	159	D.D. Lewis	Linebacker	Mississippi State
7	20	185	Bob Taucher	Offensive tackle	Nebraska
8	19	211	Frank Brown	Defensive Tackle	Albany State (NY)
9	22	241	Ken Kmiec	Defensive Back	Illinois
10	20	266	Ben Olison	Wide Receiver	Kansas
11	19	292	Ron Shotts	Running back	Oklahoma
12	21	321	Wilson Whitty	Linebacker	Boston University
13	20	347	Carter Lord	Wide Receiver	Harvard
14	19	373	Ron Williams	Defensive Back	West Virginia
15	21	402	Tony Lunceford	Kicker	Auburn
16	20	428	Larry Cole	Defensive end	Hawaii
17	19	454	George Nordgren	Running Back	Houston

== 1969 draft ==
Round	Pick #	Overall	Name	Position	College
1	24	24	Calvin Hill	Running back	Yale
2	23	49	Richmond Flowers	Safety	Tennessee
3	16	68	Tom Stincic	Linebacker	Michigan
3	22	74	Halvor Hagen	Guard	Weber State
5	21	125	Chuck Kyle	Linebacker	Purdue
6	22	152	Rick Shaw	Wide receiver	Arizona State
7	24	180	Larry Bales	Wide Receiver	Emory and Henry
8	23	205	Elmer Benhardt	Linebacker	Missouri
9	22	230	Claxton Welch	Running Back	Oregon
10	24	258	Stuart Gottlieb	Offensive tackle	Weber State
11	23	283	Clarence Williams	Defensive end	Prairie View A&M
12	22	308	Bob Belden	Quarterback	Notre Dame
13	19	336	Rene Matison	Wide Receiver	New Mexico
14	23	361	Gerald Lutri	Offensive Tackle	Northern Michigan
15	22	386	Bill Justus	Defensive Back	Tennessee
16	24	414	Floyd Kerr	Defensive Back	Colorado State
17	23	439	Bill Bailey	Defensive Tackle	Lewis & Clark

== 1970 draft ==
Round	Pick #	Overall	Name	Position	College
1	23	23	Duane Thomas	Running back	West Texas State
2	1	27	Bob Asher	Offensive tackle	Vanderbilt
2	23	49	Margene Adkins	Wide receiver	Henderson J.C.
3	14	66	Charlie Waters	Safety	Clemson
3	21	73	Steve Kiner	Linebacker	Tennessee
3	23	75	Denton Fox	Defensive Back	Texas Tech
4	23	101	John Fitzgerald	Center	Boston College
6	23	153	Pat Toomay	Defensive end	Vanderbilt
7	23	179	Don Abbey	Linebacker	Penn State
8	23	205	Jerry Dossey	Guard	Arkansas
9	23	231	Zenon Andrusyshyn	Kicker	UCLA
10	23	257	Pete Athas	Cornerback	Tennessee
11	23	283	Ivan Southerland	Offensive Tackle	Clemson
12	23	309	Joe Williams	Running Back	Wyoming
13	23	335	Mark Washington	Cornerback	Morgan State
14	23	361	Julian Martin	Wide Receiver	North Carolina Central
15	23	387	Ken DeLong	Tight end	Tennessee
16	23	413	Seabern Hill	Defensive Back	Arizona State
17	23	439	Glenn Patterson	Center	Nebraska

== 1971 draft ==
Round	Pick #	Overall	Name	Position	College
1	25	25	Tody Smith	Defensive end	USC
2	25	51	Ike Thomas	Cornerback	Bishop College
3	17	69	Sam Scarber	Running back	New Mexico
3	25	77	Bill Gregory	Defensive Tackle	Wisconsin
4	2	80	Joe Carter	Tight end	Grambling
4	25	103	Adam Mitchell	Offensive tackle	Ole Miss
5	25	129	Ron Kadziel	Linebacker	Stanford
6	25	155	Steve Maier	Wide receiver	Northern Arizona
7	25	181	Bill Griffin	Offensive Tackle	Catawba
8	24	206	Ron Jessie	Wide Receiver	Kansas
9	25	233	Honor Jackson	Wide Receiver	Pacific
10	25	259	Rodney Wallace	Defensive Tackle	New Mexico
11	25	285	Ernest Bonwell	Defensive Tackle	Lane College
12	25	311	Steve Goepel	Quarterback	Colgate
13	25	337	James Ford	Running Back	Texas Southern
14	25	363	Tyrone Covey	Defensive Back	Utah State
15	25	389	Bob Young	Tight End	Delaware
16	25	415	John Brennan	Offensive Tackle	Boston College
17	24	440	John Bomer	Center	Memphis State

== 1972 draft ==
Round	Pick #	Overall	Name	Position	College
1	26	26	Bill Thomas	Running back	Boston College
2	9	35	Robert Newhouse	Fullback	Houston
2	13	39	John Babinecz	Linebacker	Villanova
2	26	52	Charles McKee	Wide receiver	Arizona
3	12	64	Mike Keller	Linebacker	Michigan
3	26	78	Marv Bateman	Punter	Utah
4	5	83	Tim Kearney	Linebacker	Northern Michigan
4	12	90	Robert West	Wide Receiver	San Diego State
4	15	93	Chuck Zapiec	Linebacker	Penn State
6	26	156	Charles Bolden	Defensive Back	Iowa
8	26	208	Ralph Coleman	Linebacker	North Carolina A&T
9	26	234	Roy Bell	Running Back	Oklahoma
10	26	260	Richard Amman	Defensive Tackle	Florida State
11	26	286	Lonnie Leonard	Defensive end	North Carolina A&T
12	26	312	Jimmy Harris	Wide Receiver	Ohio State
13	26	338	Jean Fugett	Tight end	Amherst College
14	25	363	Alan Thompson	Running Back	Wisconsin
15	26	390	Carlos Alvarez	Wide Receiver	Florida
16	26	416	Gordon Longmire	Quarterback	Utah
17	26	442	Alphonso Cain	Defensive Tackle	Bethune-Cookman

== 1973 draft ==
Round	Pick #	Overall	Name	Position	College
1	20	20	Billy Joe Dupree	Tight end	Michigan State
2	20	46	Golden Richards	Wide receiver	Hawaii
3	1	53	Harvey Martin	Defensive end	East Texas State
4	20	98	Drane Scrivener	Defensive Back	Tulsa
5	22	126	Bruce Walton	Offensive tackle	UCLA
6	21	151	Bob Leyen	Guard	Yale
7	20	176	Rodrigo Barnes	Linebacker	Rice
8	22	204	Dan Werner	Quarterback	Michigan State
9	21	229	Mike White	Defensive Back	Minnesota
10	20	254	Carl Johnson	Linebacker	Tennessee
11	22	282	Gerald Caswell	Guard	Colorado State
12	21	307	Jim Arneson	Guard	Arizona
13	20	332	John Smith	Wide Receiver	UCLA
14	22	360	Bob Thornton	Guard	North Carolina
15	21	385	Walt Baisy	Linebacker	Grambling
16	20	410	John Conley	Tight End	Hawaii
17	22	438	Les Strayhorn	Running Back	East Carolina

== 1974 draft ==
Round	Pick #	Overall	Name	Position	College
1	1	1	Ed Jones	Defensive end	Tennessee State
1	22	22	Charley Young	Running back	North Carolina State
3	1	53	Danny White	Quarterback	Arizona State
3	20	72	Cal Peterson	Linebacker	UCLA
4	19	97	Ken Hutcherson	Linebacker	Livingston (AL)
4	23	101	Andy Adrade	Linebacker	Northern Michigan
5	22	126	John Kelsey	Offensive tackle	Missouri
6	21	151	Jim Bright	Defensive Back	UCLA
7	20	176	Raymond Nester	Linebacker	Michigan State
8	23	205	Mike Holt	Defensive Back	Michigan State
9	22	230	Bill Dulin	Offensive Tackle	Johnson C. Smith
10	21	255	Dennis Morgan	Running Back	Western Illinois
11	20	280	Harvey McGee	Wide receiver	Southern Miss
12	23	309	Keith Bobo	Quarterback	SMU
13	22	334	Fred Lima	Kicker	Colorado
14	21	359	Doug Richards	Defensive Back	Brigham Young
15	20	384	Bruce Craft	Offensive Tackle	Geneva College
16	23	413	Gene Killian	Guard	Tennessee
17	22	438	Lawrie Skolrood	Offensive Tackle	North Dakota

== 1975 draft ==
Round	Pick #	Overall	Name	Position	College
1	2	2	Randy White	Defensive Tackle	Maryland
1	18	18	Thomas Henderson	Linebacker	Langston
2	18	44	Burton Lawless	Guard	Florida
3	18	70	Bob Breunig	Linebacker	Arizona State
4	12	90	Pat Donovan	Defensive end	Stanford
4	18	96	Randy Hughes	Safety	Oklahoma
5	9	113	Kyle Davis	Center	Oklahoma
6	18	148	Roland Woolsey	Defensive Back	Boise State
7	17	173	Mike Hegman	Linebacker	Tennessee State
8	18	200	Mitch Hoopes	Punter	Arizona
9	18	226	Ed Jones	Defensive Back	Rutgers
10	18	252	Dennis Booker	Running back	Millersville (PA)
11	18	278	Greg Krpalek	Center	Oregon State
12	18	304	Charles Bland	Defensive Back	Cincinnati
13	18	330	Herbert Scott	Guard	Virginia Union
14	18	356	Scott Laidlaw	Running Back	Stanford
15	18	382	Willie Hamilton	Running Back	Arizona
16	17	407	Pete Clark	Tight end	Colorado State
17	18	434	Jim Testerman	Tight End	Dayton

== 1976 draft ==
Round	Pick #	Overall	Name	Position	College
1	27	27	Aaron Kyle	Cornerback	Wyoming
2	12	40	Jim Jensen	Running back	Iowa
2	27	55	Jim Eidson	Guard	Mississippi State
3	13	73	Duke Fergerson	Wide receiver	San Diego State
3	15	75	John Smith	Running Back	Boise State
3	27	87	Butch Johnson	Wide Receiver	California-Riverside
4	27	119	Tom Rafferty	Guard	Penn State
5	27	151	Wally Pesuit	Offensive tackle	Kentucky
6	25	181	Greg McGuire	Offensive Tackle	Indiana
7	4	186	Greg Schaum	Defensive Tackle	Michigan State
7	26	208	David Williams	Running Back	Colorado
8	27	236	Henry Laws	Defensive Back	South Carolina
9	27	264	Beasley Reece	Defensive Back	North Texas State
10	25	290	Leroy Cook	Defensive end	Alabama
11	27	318	Cornelius Greene	Quarterback	Ohio State
12	27	346	Charles McShane	Linebacker	California Lutheran
13	27	374	Mark Driscoll	Quarterback	Colorado State
14	27	402	Larry Mushinskie	Tight end	Nebraska
15	27	430	Dale Curry	Linebacker	UCLA
16	27	458	Rick Costanzo	Offensive Tackle	Nebraska
17	27	486	Stan Woodfill	Kicker	Oregon

== 1977 draft ==
Round	Pick #	Overall	Name	Position	College
1	2	2	Tony Dorsett	Running back	Pittsburgh
2	26	54	Glenn Carano	Quarterback	UNLV
3	6	62	Tony Hill	Wide receiver	Stanford
3	25	81	Val Belcher	Guard	Houston
4	24	108	Guy Brown	Linebacker	Houston
5	25	137	Andy Frederick	Offensive tackle	New Mexico
6	25	164	Jim Cooper	Offensive Tackle	Temple
7	24	191	David Stalls	Defensive Tackle	Northern Colorado
8	13	208	Al Cleveland	Defensive end	Pacific
8	26	221	Fred Williams	Running Back	Arizona State
9	25	248	Mark Cantrell	Center	North Carolina
10	24	275	Steve DeBerg	Quarterback	San Jose State
11	26	305	Don Wardlow	Tight end	Washington
12	25	332	Greg Peters	Guard	California

== 1978 draft ==
Round	Pick #	Overall	Name	Position	College
1	28	28	Larry Bethea	Defensive end	Michigan State
2	28	56	Todd Christensen	Tight end	Brigham Young
3	28	84	Dave Hudgens	Offensive tackle	Oklahoma
4	26	110	Alois Blackwell	Running back	Houston
5	28	138	Rich Rosen	Guard	Syracuse
6	28	166	Harold Randolph	Linebacker	East Carolina
7	28	194	Tom Randall	Defensive Tackle	Iowa State
8	28	222	Homer Butler	Wide receiver	UCLA
9	28	250	Russ Williams	Defensive Back	Tennessee
10	28	278	Barry Tomasetti	Offensive Tackle	Iowa
11	28	306	Dennis Thurman	Cornerback	USC
12	28	334	Lee Washburn	Guard	Montana State

== 1979 draft ==
Round	Pick #	Overall	Name	Position	College
1	27	27	Robert Shaw	Center	Tennessee
2	27	55	Aaron Mitchell	Defensive Back	UNLV
3	20	76	Doug Cosbie	Tight end	Santa Clara
4	27	109	Ralph DeLoach	Defensive end	California
5	11	121	Bob Hukill	Guard	North Carolina
5	18	128	Curtis Anderson	Defensive End	Central State (OH)
5	26	136	Ron Springs	Running back	Ohio State
6	18	155	Tim Lavender	Defensive Back	USC
6	23	160	Mike Salzano	Guard	North Carolina
6	27	164	Chris DeFrance	Wide receiver	Arizona State
7	26	191	Greg Fitzpatrick	Linebacker	Youngstown State
8	27	219	Bruce Thornton	Defensive Tackle	Illinois
9	27	247	Garry Cobb	Linebacker	USC
10	26	274	Mike Calhoun	Defensive Tackle	Notre Dame
12	26	329	Quentin Lowry	Linebacker	Youngstown State

== 1980 draft ==
Round	Pick #	Overall	Name	Position	College
3	22	78	Bill Roe	Linebacker	Colorado
3	24	80	James Jones	Running back	Mississippi State
4	22	105	Kurt Petersen	Defensive end	Missouri
5	23	133	Gary Hogeboom	Quarterback	Central Michigan
6	24	162	Timmy Newsome	Running Back	Winston-Salem State
7	24	189	Lester Brown	Running Back	Clemson
8	23	216	Larry Savage	Linebacker	Michigan State
9	25	246	Jackie Flowers	Wide receiver	Florida State
10	24	273	Matthew Teague	Defensive End	Prairie View A&M
11	23	300	Gary Padjen	Linebacker	Arizona State
12	25	330	Norm Wells	Defensive End	Northwestern

== 1981 draft ==
Round	Pick #	Overall	Name	Position	College
1	26	26	Howard Richards	Offensive tackle	Missouri
2	25	53	Doug Donley	Wide receiver	Ohio State
3	25	81	Glen Titensor	Guard	Brigham Young
4	8	91	Scott Pelluer	Linebacker	Washington State
4	25	108	Derrie Nelson	Linebacker	Nebraska
5	26	137	Danny Spradlin	Linebacker	Tennessee
6	25	163	Vince Skillings	Defensive Back	Ohio State
7	7	173	Ron Fellows	Cornerback	Missouri
7	25	191	Ken Miller	Defensive Back	Eastern Michigan
8	25	218	Paul Piurowski	Linebacker	Florida State
9	25	246	Mike Wilson	Wide Receiver	Washington State
10	25	273	Pat Graham	Defensive Tackle	California
11	26	302	Tim Morrison	Guard	Georgia
12	25	329	Nate Lundy	Wide Receiver	Indiana

== 1982 draft ==
Round	Pick #	Overall	Name	Position	College
1	25	25	Rod Hill	Cornerback	Kentucky State
2	26	53	Jeff Rohrer	Linebacker	Yale
3	26	81	Jim Eliopulos	Linebacker	Wyoming
4	18	101	Brian Carpenter	Cornerback	Michigan
4	26	109	Monty Hunter	Safety	Salem
5	26	137	Phil Pozderac	Offensive tackle	Notre Dame
6	4	143	Ken Hammond	Guard	Vanderbilt
6	26	165	Charles Daum	Defensive Tackle	Cal Poly
7	26	193	Bill Purifoy	Defensive end	Tulsa
8	21	216	George Peoples	Running back	Auburn
8	26	221	Dwight Sullivan	Running Back	North Carolina State
9	26	249	Joe Gary	Defensive Tackle	UCLA
10	26	277	Todd Eckerson	Offensive Tackle	North Carolina State
11	16	295	George Thompson	Wide receiver	Albany State
11	25	304	Michael Whiting	Running Back	Florida State
12	26	332	Rich Burtness	Guard	Montana

== 1983 draft ==
Round	Pick #	Overall	Name	Position	College
1	23	23	Jim Jeffcoat	Defensive end	Arizona State
2	22	50	Michael Walter	Linebacker	Oregon
3	21	77	Bryan Caldwell	Defensive End	Arizona State
4	24	108	Chris Faulkner	Tight end	Florida
5	23	135	Chuck McSwain	Running back	Clemson
6	22	162	Reggie Collier	Quarterback	Southern Miss
7	21	189	Chris Schultz	Offensive tackle	Arizona
8	24	220	Lawrence Ricks	Running Back	Michigan
9	22	246	Al Gross	Defensive Back	Arizona
10	22	273	Eric Moran	Offensive Tackle	Washington
11	21	300	Dan Taylor	Offensive Tackle	Idaho State
12	24	331	Lorenzo Bouier	Running Back	Maine

== 1984 draft ==
Round	Pick #	Overall	Name	Position	College
1	25	25	Billy Cannon Jr.	Linebacker	Texas A&M
2	12	40	Victor Scott	Defensive Back	Colorado
3	25	81	Fred Cornwell	Tight end	USC
4	26	110	Steve DeOssie	Linebacker	Boston College
5	1	113	Steve Pelluer	Quarterback	Washington
5	25	137	Norm Granger	Running back	Iowa
6	12	152	Eugene Lockhart	Linebacker	Houston
6	26	166	Joe Levelis	Guard	Iowa
7	25	193	Ed Martin	Linebacker	Indiana State
8	26	222	Mike Revell	Running Back	Bethune-Cookman
9	8	232	John Hunt	Guard	Florida
9	25	249	Neil Maune	Guard	Notre Dame
10	26	278	Brian Salonen	Tight End	Montana
11	25	305	Dowe Aughtman	Defensive Tackle	Auburn
12	26	334	Carl Lewis	Wide receiver	Houston

== 1985 draft ==
Round	Pick #	Overall	Name	Position	College
1	17	17	Kevin Brooks	Defensive end	Michigan
2	16	44	Jesse Penn	Linebacker	Virginia Tech
3	20	76	Crawford Ker	Guard	Florida
4	19	103	Robert Lavette	Running back	Georgia Tech
5	2	114	Herschel Walker	Running Back	Georgia
5	7	119	Matt Darwin	Center	Texas A&M
6	4	144	Kurt Ploeger	Defensive End	Gustavus Adolphus
6	17	157	Matt Moran	Guard	Stanford
7	10	178	Karl Powe	Wide receiver	Alabama State
7	16	184	Jim Herrmann	Defensive End	Brigham Young
8	20	216	Leon Gonzalez	Wide Receiver	Bethune-Cookman
9	19	243	Scott Strasburger	Linebacker	Nebraska
10	18	270	Joe Jones	Tight end	Virginia Tech
11	17	297	Neal Dellocono	Linebacker	UCLA
12	16	324	Karl Jordan	Linebacker	Vanderbilt

== 1986 draft ==
Round	Pick #	Overall	Name	Position	College
1	18	18	Mike Sherrard	Wide receiver	UCLA
2	6	33	Darryl Clack	Running back	Arizona State
3	19	74	Mark Walen	Defensive Tackle	UCLA
4	18	100	Max Zendejas	Kicker	Arizona
6	2	140	Thornton Chandler	Tight end	Alabama
6	12	150	Stan Gelbaugh	Quarterback	Maryland
6	20	158	Lloyd Yancey	Guard	Temple
7	19	185	Johnny Holloway	Wide Receiver	Kansas
8	18	212	Topper Clemons	Running Back	Wake Forest
9	21	242	John Ionata	Guard	Florida State
10	20	269	Bryan Chester	Guard	Texas
11	19	269	Garth Jax	Linebacker	Florida State
12	2	307	Chris Duliban	Linebacker	Texas
12	17	322	Tony Flack	Defensive Back	Georgia

== 1987 draft ==
Round	Pick #	Overall	Name	Position	College
1	12	12	Danny Noonan	Defensive Tackle	Nebraska
2	11	39	Ron Francis	Cornerback	Baylor
3	12	68	Jeff Zimmerman	Guard	Florida
4	11	95	Kelvin Martin	Wide receiver	Boston College
5	12	124	Everett Gay	Wide Receiver	Texas
6	11	151	Joe Onosai	Center	Hawaii
7	12	180	Kevin Sweeney	Quarterback	Fresno State
8	11	206	Kevin Gogan	Guard	Washington
9	12	234	Alvin Blount	Running back	Maryland
10	11	262	Dale Jones	Linebacker	Tennessee
11	12	291	Jeff Ward	Kicker	Texas
12	11	318	Scott Armstrong	Linebacker	Florida

== 1988 draft ==
Round	Pick #	Overall	Name	Position	College
1	11	11	Michael Irvin	Wide receiver	Miami (FL)
2	14	41	Ken Norton Jr.	Linebacker	UCLA
3	12	67	Mark Hutson	Guard	Oklahoma
4	12	94	Dave Widell	Offensive tackle	Boston College
6	14	151	Scott Secules	Quarterback	Virginia
7	13	178	Owen Hooven	Offensive Tackle	Oregon State
8	12	205	Mark Higgs	Running back	Kentucky
9	11	232	Brian Bedford	Wide Receiver	California
10	14	263	Billy Owens	Defensive Back	Pittsburgh
11	13	290	Chad Hennings	Defensive Tackle	Air Force
12	12	317	Ben Hummell	Linebacker	UCLA

== 1989 draft ==
Round	Pick #	Overall	Name	Position	College
1	1	1	Troy Aikman	Quarterback	UCLA
2	1	29	Steve Wisniewski	Guard	Penn State
2	11	39	Daryl Johnston	Fullback	Syracuse
3	1	57	Mark Stepnoski	Center	Pittsburgh
3	12	68	Rhondy Weston	Defensive end	Florida
4	1	85	Tony Tolbert	Defensive End	UTEP
5	1	113	Keith Jennings	Tight end	Clemson
5	7	119	Willis Crockett	Linebacker	Georgia Tech
5	13	125	Jeff Roth	Defensive Tackle	Florida
7	1	168	Kevin Peterson	Linebacker	Northwestern
8	1	196	Charvez Foger	Running back	Nevada
9	1	224	Tim Jackson	Defensive Back	Nebraska
10	1	252	Rod Carter	Linebacker	Miami (FL)
11	1	280	Randy Shannon	Linebacker	Miami (FL)
12	1	308	Scott Ankrom	Wide receiver	TCU

== 1990 draft ==
Round	Pick #	Overall	Name	Position	College
1	17	17	Emmitt Smith	Running back	Florida
2	1	26	Alexander Wright	Wide receiver	Auburn
3	11	64	Jimmie Jones	Defensive Tackle	Miami (FL)
9	1	221	Kenneth Gant	Safety	Albany State
11	1	277	Dave Harper	Linebacker	Humboldt State

== 1991 draft ==
Round	Pick #	Overall	Name	Position	College
1	1	1	Russell Maryland	Defensive Tackle	Miami (FL)
1	12	12	Alvin Harper	Wide receiver	Tennessee
1	20	20	Kelvin Pritchett	Defensive Tackle	Ole Miss
2	10	37	Dixon Edwards	Linebacker	Michigan State
3	7	62	Godfrey Myles	Linebacker	Florida
3	9	64	James Richards	Guard	California
3	15	70	Erik Williams	Offensive tackle	Central State (OH)
4	14	97	Curvin Richards	Running back	Pittsburgh
4	23	106	Bill Musgrave	Quarterback	Oregon
4	25	108	Tony Hill	Defensive end	Tennessee-Chattanooga
4	27	110	Kevin Harris	Defensive End	Texas Southern
5	21	132	Darrick Brownlow	Linebacker	Illinois
6	14	153	Mike Sullivan	Guard	Miami (FL)
7	6	173	Leon Lett	Defensive Tackle	Emporia State
9	12	235	Damon Mays	Wide Receiver	Missouri
10	14	264	Sean Love	Guard	Penn State
11	13	291	Tony Boles	Running Back	Michigan
12	14	320	Larry Brown	Cornerback	TCU

== 1992 draft ==
Round	Pick #	Overall	Name	Position	College
1	17	17	Kevin Smith	Cornerback	Texas A&M
1	24	24	Robert Jones	Linebacker	East Carolina
2	8	36	Jimmy Smith	Wide receiver	Jackson State
2	9	37	Darren Woodson	Safety	Arizona State
3	2	58	Clayton Holmes	Cornerback	Carson-Newman
3	26	82	James Brown	Offensive tackle	Virginia State
4	25	109	Tom Myslinski	Guard	Tennessee
5	8	120	Greg Briggs	Defensive Back	Texas Southern
5	9	121	Rod Milstead	Guard	Delaware State
6	9	149	Fallon Wacasey	Tight end	Tulsa
9	24	248	Nate Kirtman	Defensive Back	Pomona-Pitzer
9	26	250	Chris Hall	Defensive Back	East Carolina
10	23	275	John Terry	Guard	Livingstone
11	22	302	Tim Daniel	Wide Receiver	Florida A&M
12	9	317	Don Harris	Defensive Back	Texas Tech

== 1993 draft ==
Round	Pick #	Overall	Name	Position	College
2	17	46	Kevin Williams	Wide receiver	Miami (FL)
2	25	54	Darrin Smith	Linebacker	Miami (FL)
3	28	84	Mike Middleton	Defensive Back	Indiana
4	10	94	Derrick Lassic	Running back	Alabama
4	12	96	Ron Stone	Guard	Boston College
6	28	168	Barry Minter	Linebacker	Tulsa
7	28	196	Brock Marion	Safety	Nevada
8	7	203	Dave Thomas	Cornerback	Tennessee
8	17	213	Reggie Givens	Linebacker	Penn State

== 1994 draft ==
Round	Pick #	Overall	Name	Position	College
1	23	23	Shante Carver	Defensive end	Arizona State
2	17	46	Larry Allen	Guard	Sonoma State
3	37	102	George Hegamin	Offensive tackle	North Carolina State
4	6	109	Willie Jackson	Wide receiver	Florida
4	28	131	DeWayne Dotson	Linebacker	Ole Miss
6	30	191	Darren Studstill	Defensive Back	West Virginia
7	22	216	Toddrick McIntosh	Defensive Tackle	Florida State

== 1995 draft ==
Round	Pick #	Overall	Name	Position	College
2	14	46	Sherman Williams	Running back	Alabama
2	27	59	Kendell Watkins	Tight end	Mississippi State
2	31	63	Shane Hannah	Guard	Michigan State
3	28	92	Charlie Williams	Defensive Back	Bowling Green
4	12	110	Eric Bjornson	Tight End	Washington
4	31	129	Alundis Brice	Defensive Back	Ole Miss
4	32	130	Linc Harden	Linebacker	Oklahoma State
5	32	166	Ed Hervey	Wide receiver	USC
5	34	168	Dana Howard	Linebacker	Illinois
7	28	236	Oscar Sturgis	Defensive end	North Carolina

== 1996 draft ==
Round	Pick #	Overall	Name	Position	College
2	7	37	Kavika Pittman	Defensive end	McNeese State
2	19	49	Randall Godfrey	Linebacker	Georgia
3	6	67	Clay Shiver	Center	Florida State
3	33	94	Stepfret Williams	Wide receiver	Northeast Louisiana
3	34	95	Mike Ulufale	Defensive Tackle	Brigham Young
5	25	157	Kenneth McDaniel	Guard	Norfolk State
5	35	167	Alan Campos	Linebacker	Louisville
6	40	207	Wendell Davis	Cornerback	Oklahoma
7	34	243	Ryan Wood	Running back	Arizona State

== 1997 draft ==
Round	Pick #	Overall	Name	Position	College
1	22	22	David LaFleur	Tight end	LSU
3	5	65	Dexter Coakley	Linebacker	Appalachian State
3	23	83	Steve Scifres	Guard	Wyoming
3	34	94	Kenny Wheaton	Running back	Oregon
4	5	101	Antonio Anderson	Defensive Tackle	Syracuse
4	31	127	Macey Brooks	Wide receiver	James Madison
4	33	129	Nicky Sualua	Fullback	Ohio State
6	24	187	Lee Vaughn	Defensive Back	Wyoming
7	23	224	Omar Stoutmire	Safety	Fresno State

== 1998 draft ==
Round	Pick #	Overall	Name	Position	College
1	8	8	Greg Ellis	Defensive end	North Carolina
2	8	38	Flozell Adams	Offensive tackle	Michigan State
4	8	100	Michael Myers	Defensive Tackle	Alabama
5	7	130	Darren Hambrick	Linebacker	South Carolina
5	15	138	Oliver Ross	Offensive Tackle	Iowa State
6	35	188	Izell Reese	Safety	UAB
7	34	223	Tarik Smith	Running back	California
7	38	227	Antonio Fleming	Guard	Georgia
7	48	237	Rodrick Monroe	Tight end	Cincinnati

== 1999 draft ==
Round	Pick #	Overall	Name	Position	College
1	20	20	Ebenezer Ekuban	Defensive end	North Carolina
2	24	55	Solomon Page	Guard	West Virginia
3	24	85	Dat Nguyen	Linebacker	Texas A&M
4	23	118	Wane McGarity	Wide receiver	Texas
4	37	132	Peppi Zellner	Defensive End	Fort Valley State
6	24	193	MarTay Jenkins	Wide Receiver	Nebraska-Omaha
7	23	229	Mike Lucky	Tight end	Arizona
7	37	243	Kelvin Garmon	Guard	Baylor

== 2000 draft ==
Round	Pick #	Overall	Name	Position	College
2	18	49	Dwayne Goodrich	Cornerback	Tennessee
4	15	109	Kareem Larrimore	Cornerback	West Texas A&M
5	15	144	Michael Wiley	Running back	Ohio State
6	14	180	Mario Edwards	Cornerback	Florida State
7	13	219	Orantes Grant	Linebacker	Georgia

== 2001 draft ==
Round	Pick #	Overall	Name	Position	College
2	22	53	Quincy Carter	Quarterback	Georgia
2	25	56	Tony Dixon	Safety	Alabama
3	31	93	Willie Blade	Defensive Tackle	Mississippi State
4	27	122	Markus Steele	Linebacker	USC
5	6	137	Matt Lehr	Guard	Virginia Tech
6	8	171	Daleroy Stewart	Defensive Tackle	Southern Miss
7	7	207	Colston Weatherington	Defensive end	Central Missouri State
7	40	240	John Nix	Defensive Tackle	Southern Miss
7	42	242	Char-ron Dorsey	Offensive tackle	Florida State

== 2002 draft ==
Round	Pick #	Overall	Name	Position	College
1	8	8	Roy Williams	Safety	Oklahoma
2	5	37	Andre Gurode	Center	Colorado
2	31	63	Antonio Bryant	Wide receiver	Pittsburgh
3	10	75	Derek Ross	Cornerback	Ohio State
4	31	129	Jamar Martin	Fullback	Ohio State
5	33	168	Pete Hunter	Defensive Back	Virginia Union
6	7	179	Tyson Walter	Guard	Ohio State
6	36	208	Deveren Johnson	Wide Receiver	Sacred Heart
6	39	211	Bob Slowikowski	Tight end	Virginia Tech

== 2003 draft ==
Round	Pick #	Overall	Name	Position	College
1	5	5	Terence Newman	Cornerback	Kansas State
2	6	38	Al Johnson	Center	Wisconsin
3	5	69	Jason Witten	Tight end	Tennessee
4	6	103	Bradie James	Linebacker	LSU
6	5	178	B. J. Tucker	Cornerback	Wisconsin
6	13	186	Zuriel Smith	Wide receiver	Hampton
7	5	219	Justin Bates	Guard	Colorado

== 2004 draft ==
Round	Pick #	Overall	Name	Position	College
2	11	43	Julius Jones	Running back	Notre Dame
2	20	52	Jacob Rogers	Offensive tackle	USC
3	20	83	Stephen Peterman	Guard	LSU
4	25	121	Bruce Thornton	Cornerback	Georgia
5	12	144	Sean Ryan	Tight end	Boston College
7	4	205	Nathan Jones	Cornerback	Rutgers
7	15	216	Patrick Crayton	Wide receiver	Northwestern Oklahoma State
7	22	223	Jacques Reeves	Cornerback	Purdue

== 2005 draft ==
Round	Pick #	Overall	Name	Position	College
1	11	11	DeMarcus Ware	Linebacker	Troy
1	20	20	Marcus Spears	Defensive end	LSU
2	10	42	Kevin Burnett	Linebacker	Tennessee
4	8	109	Marion Barber III	Running back	Minnesota
4	31	132	Chris Canty	Defensive End	Virginia
6	34	208	Justin Beriault	Safety	Ball State
6	35	209	Rob Petitti	Offensive tackle	Pittsburgh
7	10	224	Jay Ratliff	Defensive Tackle	Auburn

== 2006 draft ==
Round	Pick #	Overall	Name	Position	College
1	18	18	Bobby Carpenter	Linebacker	Ohio State
2	21	53	Anthony Fasano	Tight end	Notre Dame
3	28		Jason Hatcher	Defensive end	Grambling
4	28	125	Skyler Green	Wide receiver	LSU
5	5	138	Pat Watkins	Safety	Florida State
6	13	182	Montavious Stanley	Defensive Tackle	Louisville
7	3	211	Pat McQuistan	Offensive tackle	Weber State
7	16	244	E. J. Whitley	Center	Texas Tech

== 2007 draft ==
Round	Pick #	Overall	Name	Position	College
1	26	26	Anthony Spencer	Linebacker	Purdue
3	3	67	James Marten	Offensive tackle	Boston College
4	4	103	Isaiah Stanback	Wide receiver	Washington
4	23	122	Doug Free	Offensive Tackle	Northern Illinois
6	4	178	Nick Folk	Kicker	Arizona
6	21	195	Deon Anderson	Fullback	Connecticut
7	2	212	Courtney Brown	Defensive Back	Cal Poly
7	27	237	Alan Ball	Cornerback	Illinois

== 2008 draft ==
Round	Pick #	Overall	Name	Position	College
1	22	22	Felix Jones	Running back	Arkansas
1	25	25	Mike Jenkins	Cornerback	South Florida
2	30	61	Martellus Bennett	Tight end	Texas A&M
4	23	122	Tashard Choice	Running Back	Georgia Tech
5	8	143	Orlando Scandrick	Cornerback	Boise State
6	1	167	Erik Walden	Linebacker	Middle Tennessee State

== 2009 draft ==
Round	Pick #	Overall	Name	Position	College
3	5	69	Jason Williams	Linebacker	Western Illinois
3	11	75	Robert Brewster	Offensive tackle	Ball State
4	1	101	Stephen McGee	Quarterback	Texas A&M
4	10	110	Victor Butler	Linebacker	Oregon State
4	20	120	Brandon Williams	Defensive end	Texas Tech
5	7	153	DeAngelo Smith	Cornerback	Cincinnati
5	30	166	Michael Hamlin	Safety	Clemson
5	36	172	David Buehler	Kicker	USC
6	24	197	Stephen Hodge	Safety	TCU
6	35	208	John Phillips	Tight end	Virginia
7	18	227	Mike Mickens	Cornerback	Cincinnati
7	20	229	Manuel Johnson	Wide receiver	Oklahoma

== 2010 draft ==
Round	Pick #	Overall	Name	Position	College
1	24	24	Dez Bryant	Wide receiver	Oklahoma State
2	23	55	Sean Lee	Linebacker	Penn State
4	28	126	Akwasi Owusu-Ansah	Safety	Indiana (PA)
6	10	179	Sam Young	Offensive tackle	Notre Dame
6	27	196	Jamar Wall	Cornerback	Texas Tech
7	27	234	Sean Lissemore	Defensive Tackle	William & Mary

== 2011 draft ==
Round	Pick #	Overall	Name	Position	College
1	9	9	Tyron Smith	Offensive tackle	USC
2	8	40	Bruce Carter	Linebacker	North Carolina
3	7	71	DeMarco Murray	Running back	Oklahoma
4	13	110	David Arkin	Guard	Missouri State
5	12	143	Josh Thomas	Cornerback	Buffalo
6	11	176	Dwayne Harris	Wide receiver	East Carolina
7	17	220	Shaun Chapas	Fullback	Georgia
7	49	252	Bill Nagy	Center	Wisconsin

== 2012 draft ==
Round	Pick #	Overall	Name	Position	College
1	6	6	Morris Claiborne	Cornerback	Louisiana State
3	18	81	Tyrone Crawford	Defensive end	Boise State
4	18	113	Kyle Wilber	Linebacker	Wake Forest
4	40	135	Matt Johnson	Safety	Eastern Washington
5	17	152	Danny Coale	Wide receiver	Virginia Tech
6	16	186	James Hanna	Tight end	Oklahoma
7	15	222	Caleb McSurdy	Linebacker	Montana

== 2013 draft ==
Round	Pick #	Overall	Name	Position	College
1	31	31	Travis Frederick	Center	Wisconsin
2	15	47	Gavin Escobar	Tight end	San Diego State
3	12	74	Terrance Williams	Wide receiver	Baylor
3	18	80	J.J. Wilcox	Safety	Georgia Southern
4	17	114	B. W. Webb	Cornerback	William & Mary
5	18	151	Joseph Randle	Running back	Oklahoma State
6	17	185	DeVonte Holloman	Linebacker	South Carolina

== 2014 draft ==
Round	Pick #	Overall	Name	Position	College
1	16	16	Zack Martin	Guard	Notre Dame
2	2	34	DeMarcus Lawrence	Defensive end	Boise State
4	19	119	Anthony Hitchens	Linebacker	Iowa
5	6	146	Devin Street	Wide receiver	Pittsburgh
7	16	231	Ben Gardner	Defensive End	Stanford
7	23	238	Will Smith	Linebacker	Texas Tech
7	33	248	Ahmad Dixon	Safety	Baylor
7	36	251	Ken Bishop	Defensive Tackle	Northern Illinois
7	39	255	Terrance Mitchell	Cornerback	Oregon

== 2015 draft ==
Round	Pick #	Overall	Name	Position	College
1	27	27	Byron Jones	Cornerback	Connecticut
2	28	60	Randy Gregory	Defensive end	Nebraska
3	27	91	Chaz Green	Offensive tackle	Florida
4	28	127	Damien Wilson	Linebacker	Minnesota
5	27	163	Ryan Russell	Defensive End	Purdue
7	19	236	Mark Nzeocha	Linebacker	Wyoming
7	26	243	Laurence Gibson	Offensive Tackle	Virginia Tech
7	29	246	Geoff Swaim	Tight end	Texas

== 2016 draft ==
Round	Pick #	Overall	Name	Position	College
1	4	4	Ezekiel Elliott	Running back	Ohio State
2	3	34	Jaylon Smith	Linebacker	Notre Dame
3	4	67	Maliek Collins	Defensive Tackle	Nebraska
4	3	101	Charles Tapper	Defensive end	Oklahoma
4	37	135	Dak Prescott	Quarterback	Mississippi State
6	14	189	Anthony Brown	Cornerback	Purdue
6	37	212	Kavon Frazier	Safety	Central Michigan
6	41	216	Darius Jackson	Running Back	Eastern Michigan
6	42	217	Rico Gathers	Tight end	Baylor

== 2017 draft ==
Round	Pick #	Overall	Name	Position	College
1	28	28	Taco Charlton	Defensive end	Michigan
2	28	60	Chidobe Awuzie	Cornerback	Colorado
3	28	92	Jourdan Lewis	Cornerback	Michigan
4	27	133	Ryan Switzer	Wide receiver	North Carolina
6	7	191	Xavier Woods	Safety	Louisiana Tech
6	33	216	Marquez White	Cornerback	Florida State
7	10	228	Joey Ivie	Defensive Tackle	Florida
7	21	239	Noah Brown	Wide Receiver	Ohio State
7	28	246	Jordan Carrell	Defensive Tackle	Colorado

== 2018 draft ==
Round	Pick #	Overall	Name	Position	College
1	19	19	Leighton Vander Esch	Linebacker	Boise State
2	18	50	Connor Williams	Guard	Texas
3	17	81	Michael Gallup	Wide receiver	Colorado State
4	16	116	Dorance Armstrong Jr.	Defensive end	Kansas
4	37	137	Dalton Schultz	Tight end	Stanford
5	34	171	Mike White	Quarterback	Western Kentucky
6	19	193	Chris Covington	Linebacker	Indiana
6	34	208	Cedrick Wilson Jr.	Wide Receiver	Boise State
7	18	236	Bo Scarbrough	Running back	Alabama

== 2019 draft ==
Round	Pick #	Overall	Name	Position	College
2	26	58	Trysten Hill	Defensive Tackle	Central Florida
3	27	90	Connor McGovern	Guard	Penn State
4	26	128	Tony Pollard	Running back	Memphis
5	20	158	Michael Jackson	Cornerback	Miami (FL)
5	27	165	Joe Jackson	Defensive end	Miami (FL)
6	41	213	Donovan Wilson	Safety	Texas A&M
7	4	218	Mike Weber	Running Back	Ohio State
7	27	241	Jalen Jelks	Defensive End	Oregon

== 2020 draft ==
Round	Pick #	Overall	Name	Position	College
1	17	17	CeeDee Lamb	Wide receiver	Oklahoma
2	19	51	Trevon Diggs	Cornerback	Alabama
3	18	82	Neville Gallimore	Defensive tackle	Oklahoma
4	17	123	Reggie Robinson II	Cornerback	Tulsa
4	40	146	Tyler Biadasz	Center	Wisconsin
5	34	179	Bradlee Anae	Defensive end	Utah
7	17	231	Ben DiNucci	Quarterback	James Madison

== 2021 draft ==
Round	Pick #	Overall	Name	Position	College
1	12	12	Micah Parsons	Linebacker	Penn State
2	12	44	Kelvin Joseph	Cornerback	Kentucky
3	11	75	Osa Odighizuwa	Defensive tackle	UCLA
3	21	84	Chauncey Golston	Defensive end	Iowa
3	36	99	Nahshon Wright	Cornerback	Oregon State
4	10	115	Jabril Cox	Linebacker	LSU
4	33	138	Josh Ball	Offensive tackle	Marshall
5	35	179	Simi Fehoko	Wide receiver	Stanford
6	8	192	Quinton Bohanna	Defensive tackle	Kentucky
6	43	227	Israel Mukuamu	Cornerback	South Carolina
7	10	238	Matt Farniok	Guard	Nebraska

== 2022 draft ==
Round	Pick #	Overall	Name	Position	College
1	24	24	Tyler Smith	Offensive tackle	Tulsa
2	24	56	Sam Williams	Defensive end	Ole Miss
3	24	88	Jalen Tolbert	Wide receiver	South Alabama
4	24	129	Jake Ferguson	Tight end	Wisconsin
5	12	155	Matt Waletzko	Offensive tackle	North Dakota
5	24	167	DaRon Bland	Cornerback	Fresno State
5	33	176	Damone Clark	Linebacker	LSU
5	35	178	John Ridgeway III	Defensive tackle	Arkansas
6	14	193	Devin Harper	Linebacker	Oklahoma State

== 2023 draft ==
Round	Pick #	Overall	Name	Position	College
1	26	26	Mazi Smith	Defensive tackle	Michigan
2	27	58	Luke Schoonmaker	Tight end	Michigan
3	27	90	DeMarvion Overshown	Linebacker	Texas
4	27	129	Viliami Fehoko	Defensive end	San Jose State
5	34	169	Asim Richards	Offensive tackle	North Carolina
6	1	178	Eric Scott Jr.	Cornerback	Southern Miss
6	35	212	Deuce Vaughn	Running back	Kansas State
7	27	244	Jalen Brooks	Wide receiver	South Carolina

== 2024 draft ==
Round	Pick #	Overall	Name	Position	College
1	29	29	Tyler Guyton	Offensive tackle	Oklahoma
2	24	56	Marshawn Kneeland	Defensive end	Western Michigan
3	9	73	Cooper Beebe	Guard	Kansas State
3	24	87	Marist Liufau	Linebacker	Notre Dame
5	39	174	Caelen Carson	Cornerback	Wake Forest
6	40	216	Ryan Flournoy	Wide receiver	Southeast Missouri State
7	13	233	Nate Thomas	Offensive tackle	Louisiana
7	24	244	Justin Rogers	Defensive tackle	Auburn

== 2025 draft ==
Round	Pick #	Overall	Name	Position	College
1	12	12	Tyler Booker	Guard	Alabama
2	12	44	Donovan Ezeiruaku	Defensive end	Boston College
3	12	76	Shavon Revel	Cornerback	East Carolina
5	12	149	Jaydon Blue	Running Back	Texas
5	16	152	Shemar James	Linebacker	Florida
6	28	204	Ajani Cornelius	Offensive tackle	Oregon
7	1	217	Jay Toia	Defensive tackle	UCLA
7	23	239	Phil Mafah	Running Back	Clemson
7	31	247	Tommy Akingbesote	Defensive tackle	Maryland

== 2026 draft ==
Round	Pick #	Overall	Name	Position	College
1	11	11	Caleb Downs	Safety	Ohio State
1	23	23	Malachi Lawrence	Defensive end	UCF
3	28	92	Jaishawn Barham	Defensive end	Michigan
4	12	112	Drew Shelton	Offensive tackle	Penn State
4	14	114	Devin Moore	Cornerback	Florida
4	37	137	LT Overton	Defensive end	Alabama
7	2	218	Anthony Smith	Wide receiver	East Carolina

== See also ==
- History of the Dallas Cowboys
- List of professional American football drafts
