= List of Dallas Cowboys first-round draft picks =

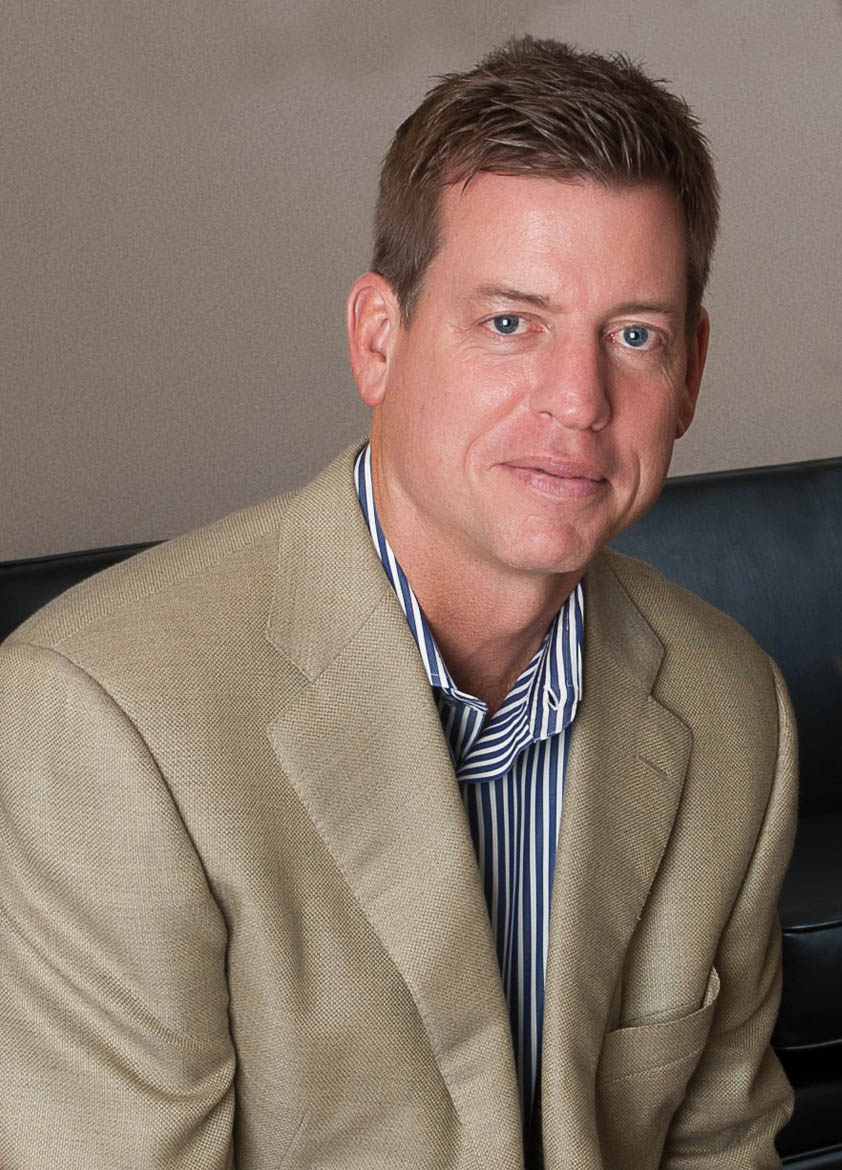
The Cowboys drafted quarterback Troy Aikman first overall in the 1989 NFL draft. Aikman spent his entire 12-year career with Dallas and was inducted into the Pro Football Hall of Fame in 2006.

The Dallas Cowboys are a professional American football team based in the Dallas–Fort Worth metroplex. The Cowboys compete in the National Football League (NFL) as a member of the National Football Conference East Division. The Cowboys joined the NFL as an expansion team in 1960 and have played their home games at AT&T Stadium in Arlington, Texas, since 2009.

The NFL draft, officially known as the "NFL Annual Player Selection Meeting", is an annual event which serves as the league's most common source of player recruitment. The draft order is determined based on the previous season's standings; the teams with the worst win–loss records receive the earliest picks. Teams that qualified for the NFL playoffs select after non-qualifiers, and their order depends on how far they advanced, using their regular season record as a tie-breaker. The final two selections in the first round are reserved for the Super Bowl runner-up and champion. Draft picks are tradable and players or other picks can be acquired with them.

Since the team's first draft, the Cowboys have selected 63 players in the first round. The team's first pick in their inaugural NFL draft was Bob Lilly, a defensive tackle from Texas Christian University; he was the 13th overall selection. The Cowboys have drafted first overall three times, selecting Ed "Too Tall" Jones in 1974, Troy Aikman in 1989, and Russell Maryland in 1991. In the most recent draft, held in 2026, the Cowboys selected Ohio State safety Caleb Downs and UCF defensive end Malachi Lawrence.

The Cowboys did not draft a player in the first round on eleven occasions. Seven of the team's first-round picks—Troy Aikman, Tony Dorsett, Michael Irvin, Bob Lilly, Emmitt Smith, DeMarcus Ware, and Randy White—have been elected to the Pro Football Hall of Fame. One of the team's first-round picks—Scott Appleton—chose to sign with the NFL's pre-merger direct competitor, the American Football League (AFL), instead.

== Player selections ==
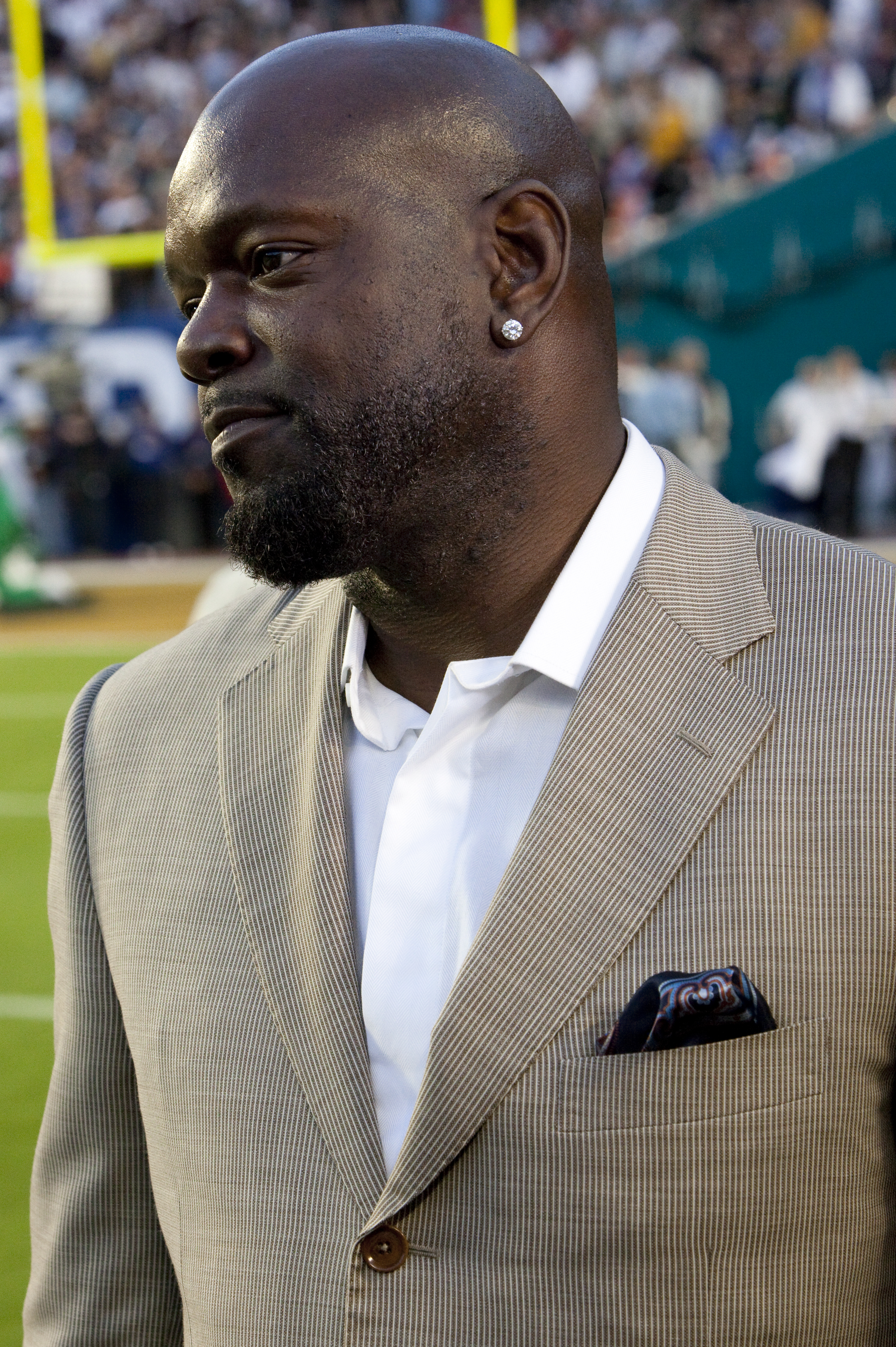
Running back Emmitt Smith was drafted by the Cowboys in 1990 and inducted into the Pro Football Hall of Fame in 2010. He spent 13 seasons with the Cowboys, during which time he was named NFL MVP, was a 5-time All-Pro, made eight Pro Bowls, and became the league's all-time leader in career rushing yards and rushing touchdowns.

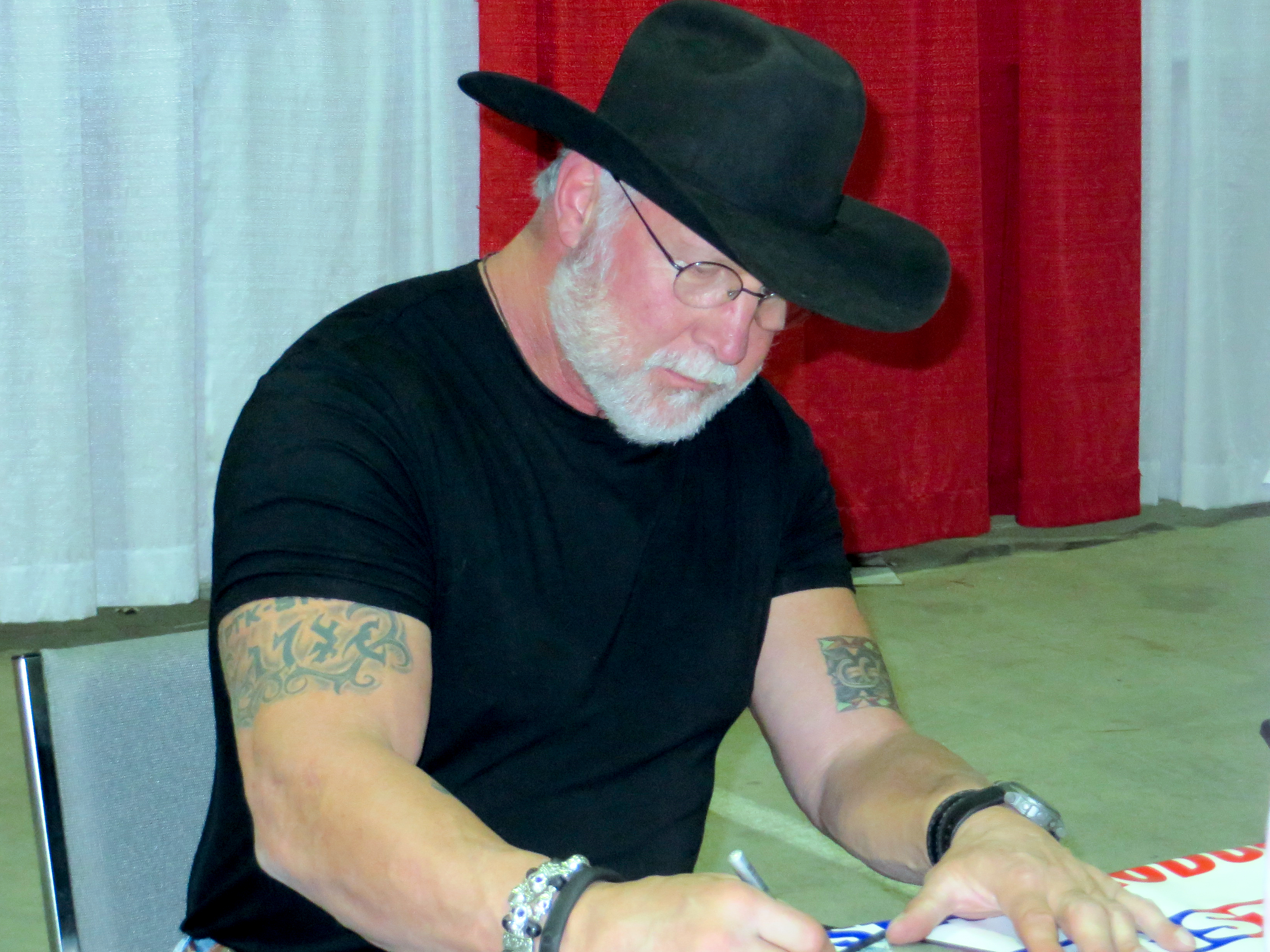
Randy White was drafted by the Cowboys with the 2nd overall pick of the 1975 NFL draft. He spent his whole career with the Cowboys, during which time he was a seven-time first-team All-Pro, nine-time Pro Bowler, and Super Bowl XII MVP. White was inducted into the Pro Football Hall of Fame in 1994 and was selected for the NFL 100th Anniversary All-Time Team.

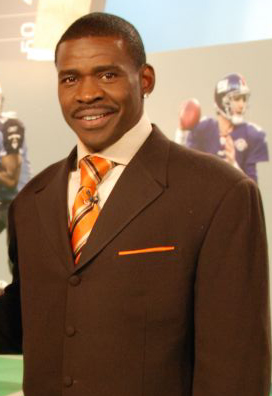
Wide receiver Michael Irvin was drafted with the 11th pick of the 1988 NFL draft. Irvin spent his whole career with the Cowboys, during which time he was a three-time All-Pro, five-time Pro Bowler, and led the league in receiving yards in 1991. A member of the Dallas Cowboys Ring of Honor, he was selected to the NFL 1990s All-Decade Team and inducted into the Pro Football Hall of Fame in 2007.

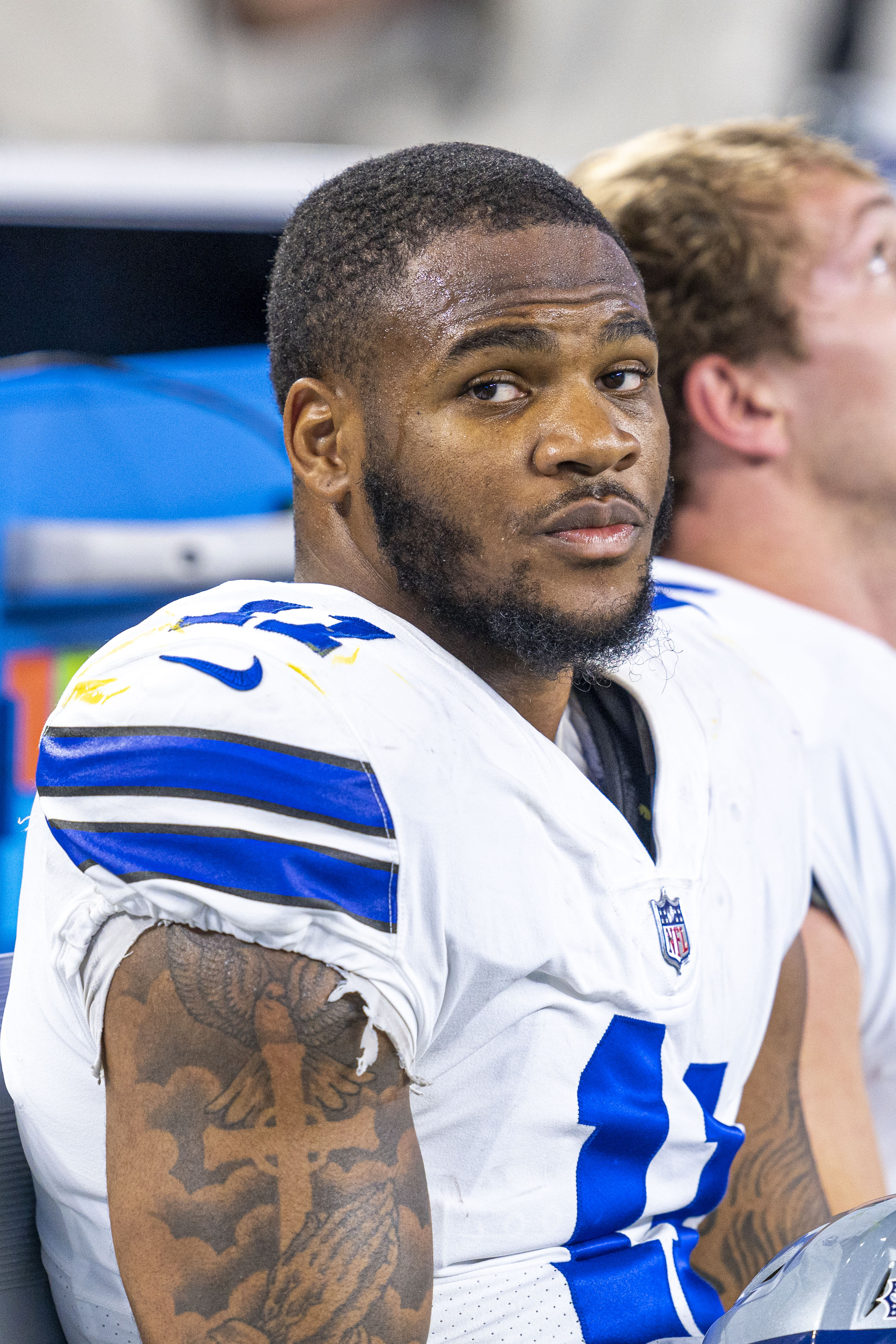
Micah Parsons is a linebacker who was drafted 12th overall in the 2021 NFL draft. He has been an All-Pro and Pro Bowler every season he's been in the NFL and won the 2021 Defensive Rookie of the Year Award. He was also the recipient of the 2021 Butkus Award.

Key
Symbol	Meaning
†	Inducted into the Pro Football Hall of Fame
*	Selected number one overall
‡	Selected number one overall and inducted into the Pro Football Hall of Fame

Position abbreviations
C	Center
CB	Cornerback
DB	Defensive back
DE	Defensive end
DT	Defensive tackle
G	Guard
LB	Linebacker
QB	Quarterback
RB	Running back
S	Safety
T	Tackle
TE	Tight end
WR	Wide receiver

Dallas Cowboys first-round draft picks by season
Season	Pick	Player	Position	College	Notes
1961	13	Bob Lilly†	DT	TCU	Original pick traded to Washington Redskins. (Note: Dallas traded their 1961 first- and sixth-round selections (Nos. 2 and 72 overall) to the Washington Redskins in exchange for quarterback Eddie LeBaron.) Pick received from Cleveland Browns. (Note: Dallas traded tackle Paul Dickson and their 1962 first-round selection (No. 4 overall) to the Cleveland Browns in exchange for their 1961 first-round selection (No. 13 overall).)
1962	No pick				Pick traded to Cleveland Browns
1963	6	Lee Roy Jordan	LB	Alabama	
1964	4	Scott Appleton	T	Texas	Signed for the AFL's Houston Oilers instead
1965	5	Craig Morton	QB	California	
1966	5	John Niland	G	Iowa	
1967	No pick				Pick traded to Houston Oilers (Note: Dallas traded their 1967 first-, second-, and two fifth-round selections (Nos. 23, 49, 119, and 127 overall) to the Houston Oilers for the rights to tackle Ralph Neely.)
1968	20	Dennis Homan	DE	Alabama	
1969	24	Calvin Hill	RB	Yale	
1970	23	Duane Thomas	RB	West Texas State	
1971	25	Tody Smith	DE	USC	
1972	26	Bill Thomas	RB	Boston College	
1973	20	Billy Joe DuPree	TE	Michigan State	
1974	1	Ed "Too Tall" Jones*	DE	Tennessee State	Pick received from Houston Oilers (Note: Dallas traded defensive end Tody Smith and wide receiver Billy Parks to the Houston Oilers in exchange for their 1974 first- and third-round selections (Nos. 1 and 53 overall).)
1974	22	Charley Young	RB	NC State	
1975	2	Randy White†	LB	Maryland	Pick received from New York Giants (Note: Dallas traded quarterback Craig Morton to the New York Giants in exchange for their 1975 first-round selection (No. 2 overall) and 1976 second-round selection (No. 40 overall).)
1975	18	Thomas Henderson	LB	Langston	
1976	27	Aaron Kyle	DB	Wyoming	
1977	2	Tony Dorsett†	RB	Pittsburgh	Moved up draft order in trades with San Diego Chargers (Note: Dallas traded their 1977 first-round selection (No. 24 overall) and quarterback Clint Longley to the San Diego Chargers in exchange for their 1977 first- and second-round selections (Nos. 14 and 41 overall).) and Seattle Seahawks (Note: Dallas traded a 1977 first- and three second-round selections (Nos. 14, 30, 41, and 54) to the Seattle Seahawks in exchange for their 1977 first-round selection (No. 2 overall).)
1978	28	Larry Bethea	DE	Michigan State	
1979	27	Robert Shaw	C	Tennessee	
1980	No pick				Pick traded to Baltimore Colts (Note: Dallas traded their 1980 first- and second-round selections (Nos. 24 and 51 overall) to the Baltimore Colts in exchange for defensive lineman John Dutton.)
1981	26	Howard Richards	T	Missouri	
1982	25	Rod Hill	DB	Kentucky State	
1983	23	Jim Jeffcoat	DE	Arizona State	
1984	25	Billy Cannon Jr.	LB	Texas A&M	
1985	17	Kevin Brooks	DE	Michigan	
1986	18	Mike Sherrard	WR	UCLA	Moved up draft order in trade with San Francisco 49ers (Note: Dallas traded their 1986 first- and fifth-round selections (Nos. 20 and 131 overall) to the San Francisco 49ers in exchange for their 1986 first-round selection (No. 18 overall).)
1987	12	Danny Noonan	DT	Nebraska	
1988	11	Michael Irvin†	WR	Miami (FL)	
1989	1	Troy Aikman‡	QB	UCLA	
1990	17	Emmitt Smith†	RB	Florida	Original pick forfeited in 1989 supplemental draft. Pick received from Minnesota Vikings. (Note: In what is now referred to as the Herschel Walker trade, Dallas traded 1990 third-, fifth-, and tenth-round selections (Nos. 54, 116, and 249 overall), a 1991 third-round selection (No. 68 overall), and running back Herschel Walker to the Minnesota Vikings in exchange for their 1990 first-, second-, and sixth-round selections (Nos. 21, 47, and 158 overall), 1991 first- and second-round selections (Nos. 11 and 38 overall), 1992 first-, second-, and third-round selections (Nos. 13, 37, and 71 overall), and four players (linebacker Jesse Solomon, linebacker David Howard, cornerback Issiac Holt, and defensive end Alex Stewart).) Moved up draft order in trade with Pittsburgh Steelers. (Note: Dallas traded a 1990 first- and third-round selection (No. 21, received from Minnesota Vikings, and 81 overall) to the Pittsburgh Steelers in exchange for their 1990 first-round selection (No. 17 overall).)
1991	1	Russell Maryland*	DT	Miami (FL)	Pick received from Minnesota Vikings. Moved up draft order in trade with New England Patriots. (Note: Dallas traded cornerback Ron Francis, linebacker David Howard, linebacker Eugene Lockhart, and a 1991 first- (received from Minnesota Vikings) and second-round selection (Nos. 11 and 41 overall) to the New England Patriots in exchange for a 1991 first-round selection (No. 1 overall).)
1991	12	Alvin Harper	WR	Tennessee	
1991	20	Kelvin Pritchett	DT	Ole Miss	Pick received from New Orleans Saints. (Note: Dallas traded quarterback Steve Walsh to the New Orleans Saints in exchange for their 1991 first- and third-round selections (Nos. 14 and 70 overall) and 1992 second-round selection (No. 52 overall).) Moved down draft order in trades with New England Patriots (Note: Dallas traded a 1991 first-round selection (No. 14 overall, received from New Orleans Saints) to the New England Patriots in exchange for a 1991 first- and fourth-round selection (Nos. 17 and 110 overall).) and Washington Redskins. (Note: Dallas traded a 1991 first-round selection (No. 17 overall, received from New England Patriots) to the Washington Redskins in exchange for their 1991 first- and fifth-round selections (Nos. 20 and 132 overall).)
1992	17	Kevin Smith	DB	Texas A&M	Pick received from Minnesota Vikings. Moved down draft order in trade with New England Patriots (Note: Dallas traded a 1992 first- (received from Minnesota Vikings) and third-round selection (Nos. 13 and 71 overall) to the New England Patriots in exchange for their 1992 first-, second-, and fourth-round selections (Nos. 19, 37, and 104 overall).) then up in trade with Atlanta Falcons. (Note: Dallas traded a 1992 first- (received from New England Patriots) and fourth-round selection (Nos. 19 and 104 overall) to the Atlanta Falcons in exchange for their 1992 first- and fifth-round selections (Nos. 17 and 120 overall).)
1992	24	Robert Jones	LB	East Carolina	
1993	No pick				Moved down draft order in trade with Green Bay Packers (Note: Dallas traded their 1993 first- and fourth-round selections (Nos. 29 and 112 overall) to the Green Bay Packers in exchange for both of their 1993 second-round selections, as well as a fourth- and eight-round selection (Nos. 46, 54, 94, and 213 overall).)
1994	23	Shante Carver	DE	Arizona State	Moved up draft order in trade with San Francisco 49ers (Note: Dallas traded their 1994 first- and second-round selections (Nos. 28 and 62 overall) to the San Francisco 49ers in exchange for their 1994 first- and seventh-round selections (Nos. 23 and 217 overall).)
1995	No pick				Moved down draft order in trade with Tampa Bay Buccaneers (Note: Dallas traded their 1995 first-round selection (No. 28 overall) to the Tampa Bay Buccaneers in exchange for two 1995 second-round selections (Nos. 41 and 63 overall).)
1996	No pick				Moved down draft order in trade with Washington Redskins (Note: Dallas traded their 1996 first-round selection (No. 30 overall) to the Washington Redskins in exchange for their 1996 second- and third-round selections (Nos. 37 and 67 overall).)
1997	22	David LaFleur	TE	LSU	Moved up draft order in trade with Philadelphia Eagles (Note: Dallas traded their 1997 first- and fifth-round selections (Nos. 25 and 155 overall) and 1998 third-round selection (No. 70 overall) to the Philadelphia Eagles in exchange for their 1997 first-round selection (No. 22 overall).)
1998	8	Greg Ellis	DE	North Carolina	
1999	20	Ebenezer Ekuban	DE	North Carolina	Moved up draft order in trade with Seattle Seahawks (Note: Dallas traded their 1999 first- and fifth-round selections (Nos. 22 and 140 overall) to the Seattle Seahawks in exchange for their 1999 first-round selection (No. 20 overall).)
2000	No pick				Pick traded to Seattle Seahawks (Note: Dallas traded their 2000 first-round selection (No. 19 overall) and 2001 first-round selection (No. 7 overall) to the Seattle Seahawks in exchange for wide receiver Joey Galloway.)
2001	No pick				Pick traded to Seattle Seahawks
2002	8	Roy Williams	S	Oklahoma	Moved down draft order in trade with Kansas City Chiefs (Note: Dallas traded their 2002 first-round selection (No. 6 overall) to the Kansas City Chiefs in exchange for their 2002 first- and third-round selections (Nos. 8 and 75 overall) and 2003 sixth-round selection (No. 186 overall).)
2003	5	Terence Newman	CB	Kansas State	
2004	No pick				Moved down draft order in trade with Buffalo Bills (Note: Dallas traded their 2004 first-round selection (No. 22 overall) to the Buffalo Bills in exchange for their 2004 second- and fifth-round selections (Nos. 43 and 144 overall) and 2005 first-round selection (No. 20 overall).)
2005	11	DeMarcus Ware†	LB	Troy	
2005	20	Marcus Spears	DE	LSU	Pick received from Buffalo Bills
2006	18	Bobby Carpenter	LB	Ohio State	
2007	26	Anthony Spencer	LB	Purdue	Moved down draft order in trade with Cleveland Browns (Note: Dallas traded their 2007 first-round selection (No. 22 overall) to the Cleveland Browns in exchange for their 2007 second-round selection (No. 36 overall) and 2008 first-round selection (No. 22 overall).) then up in trade with Philadelphia Eagles (Note: Dallas traded a 2007 second- (received from Cleveland), third-, and fifth-round selection (Nos. 36, 87, and 159 overall) to the Philadelphia Eagles in exchange for their 2007 first-round selection (No. 26 overall).)
2008	22	Felix Jones	RB	Arkansas	Pick received from Cleveland Browns
2008	25	Mike Jenkins	CB	South Florida	Moved up draft order in trade with Seattle Seahawks (Note: Dallas traded their 2008 first-, fifth-, and seventh-round selections (Nos. 28, 163, and 235 overall) to the Seattle Seahawks in exchange for their 2008 first-round selection (No. 25 overall).)
2009	No pick				Pick traded to Detroit Lions (Note: Dallas traded their 2009 first-, third-, and sixth-round selections (Nos. 20, 82, and 192 overall) to the Detroit Lions in exchange for their 2009 seventh-round selection (No. 210 overall) and wide receiver Roy Williams.)
2010	24	Dez Bryant	WR	Oklahoma State	Moved up draft order in trade with New England Patriots (Note: Dallas traded their 2010 first- and third-round selections (Nos. 27 and 90 overall) to the New England Patriots in exchange for their 2010 first- and fourth-round selections (Nos. 24 and 119 overall).)
2011	9	Tyron Smith	T	USC	
2012	6	Morris Claiborne	CB	LSU	Moved up draft order in trade with St. Louis Rams (Note: Dallas traded their 2012 first- and second-round selections (Nos. 14 and 45 overall) to the St. Louis Rams in exchange for their 2012 first-round selection (No. 6 overall).)
2013	31	Travis Frederick	C	Wisconsin	Moved down draft order in trade with San Francisco 49ers (Note: Dallas traded their 2013 first-round selection (No. 18 overall) to the San Francisco 49ers in exchange for their 2013 first- and third-round selections (Nos. 31 and 74 overall).)
2014	16	Zack Martin	T	Notre Dame	
2015	27	Byron Jones	DB	UConn	
2016	4	Ezekiel Elliott	RB	Ohio State	
2017	28	Taco Charlton	DE	Michigan	
2018	19	Leighton Vander Esch	LB	Boise State	
2019	No pick				Pick traded to Oakland Raiders (Note: Dallas traded their 2019 first-round selection (No. 27 overall) to the Oakland Raiders in exchange for wide receiver Amari Cooper.)
2020	17	CeeDee Lamb	WR	Oklahoma	
2021	12	Micah Parsons	LB	Penn State	Moved down draft order in trade with Philadelphia Eagles (Note: Dallas traded their 2021 first-round selection (No. 10 overall) to the Philadelphia Eagles in exchange for their 2021 first- and third-round selections (Nos. 12 and 84 overall).)
2022	24	Tyler Smith	T	Tulsa	
2023	26	Mazi Smith	DT	Michigan	
2024	29	Tyler Guyton	T	Oklahoma	Moved down draft order in trade with Detroit Lions (Note: Dallas traded their 2024 first-round selection (No. 24 overall) and 2025 seventh-round selection (no. yet to be determined) to the Detroit Lions in exchange for their 2024 first- and third-round selections (Nos. 29 and 73 overall).)
2025	12	Tyler Booker	G	Alabama	
2026	11	Caleb Downs	S	Ohio State	Moved up draft order in trade with Miami Dolphins (Note: Miami traded a first-round selection (11th overall) to Dallas in exchange for a first-round selection and two fifth-round selections (12th, 177th and 180th overall).)
2026	23	Malachi Lawrence	DE	UCF	Moved down draft order in trade with Philadelphia Eagles (Note: Dallas traded a first-round selection (20th overall) and a 2027 seventh-round selection to Philadelphia in exchange for a first- and two fourth-round selections (23rd, 114th and 137th overall).)

== See also ==
- Dallas Cowboys draft history
- History of the Dallas Cowboys
- List of Dallas Cowboys seasons
