= Jim Curry (American football) =

Former American football end

- Curry, 1962

Profile
- Positions: End, quarterback

Personal information
- Born: August 21, 1941 (age 85); Altoona, Pennsylvania, U.S.
- Listed height: 6 ft 4 in (1.93 m)
- Listed weight: 217 lb (98 kg)

Career information
- High school: Altoona (PA)
- College: Cincinnati (1960-1963)

Career history
- Dallas Cowboys (1964)*; Canton Bulldogs (1964); Philadelphia Bulldogs (1965); Charleston Rockets (1965); Cincinnati Bengals (1968)*
- * Offseason or practice squad member only

Awards and highlights
- First-team All-Missouri Valley Conference (1963)

Jim Curry (born August 21, 1941) is a former American football end and quarterback. He played college football for the Cincinnati Bearcats and was one of the sport's leading receivers during the 1963 season. He also played pofessional football for the Canton Bulldogs (1964), Philadelphia Bulldogs (1965), and Charleston Rockets (1965).

== Early life ==
Curry was born in 1941 at Altoona, Pennsylvania. He attended Altoona High School.

== College football ==
Curry played college football for the Cincinnati Bearcats from 1960 to 1963. Despite missing the last three games of the 1963 season with a broken arm, he ranked fourth in major-college football with 621 receiving yards. He also led the Missouri Valley Conference with an average of 15.9 yards per reception. Curry was selected as a frirst-team player on the 1963 All-Missouri Valley Conference football team.

== Professional football ==
Curry was selected by the Dallas Cowboys in the sixth round (82nd overall pick) of the 1964 NFL draft. He signed with the Cowboys but was released before the regular season. He played with the Canton Bulldogs of the United Football League during the 1964 season and the Philadelphia Bulldogs and Charleston Rockets of the Continental Football League in 1965. He signed with the Cincinnati Bengals in April 1968.

== Family and later years ==
Curry's son Shane Curry was a defensive end for the Miami Hurricanes and Indianapolis Colts before being shot and killed outside a nightclub in 1992.

Curry was inducted into the Blair County Sports Hall of Fame in 1998.
