= Malachi Lawrence =

American football player (born 2003)

No. 57 – Dallas Cowboys
- Position: Outside linebacker
- Roster status: Injured reserve

Personal information
- Born: July 21, 2003 (age 23)
- Listed height: 6 ft 4 in (1.93 m)
- Listed weight: 253 lb (115 kg)

Career information
- High school: DuPont Manual (Louisville, Kentucky)
- College: UCF (2021–2025)
- NFL draft: 2026: 1st round, 23rd overall pick

Career history
- Dallas Cowboys (2026−present)

Awards and highlights
- First-team All-Big 12 (2025)

Career NFL statistics as of Week 7, 2026
- Tackles: 13
- Sacks: 1
- Pass deflections: 2
- Stats at Pro Football Reference

Malachi Lawrence (born July 21, 2003) is an American professional football outside linebacker for the Dallas Cowboys of the National Football League (NFL). He played college football for the UCF Knights and was selected by the Cowboys in the first round of the 2026 NFL draft.

== Early life ==
Lawrence attended duPont Manual High School in Louisville, Kentucky, where he played linebacker and tight end. He committed to the University of Central Florida to play college football in December 2020, originally under head coach Josh Heupel.

== College career ==
Lawrence played at UCF from 2021 to 2025. Over his first two years he played in three games and had two tackles and 0.5 sacks. As a redshirt sophomore in 2023, he played in all 13 games and had 27 tackles and 7.5 sacks. As a junior in 2024, he started 10 of 11 games and recorded 15 tackles and five sacks. As a senior in 2025 Lawrence started all 12 games, while recording 28 tackles and seven sacks. Lawrence was named a first-team All-Big 12.

=== College ===
Season	Team	Class	GP	Tackles					Interceptions					Fumbles			
Season	Team	Class	GP	Cmb	Solo	Ast	TfL	Sck	Int	Yds	Lng	TD	PD	FF	FR	Yds	TD
2022	UCF	SO	3	2	1	1	0.5	0.5	0	0	0	0	0	0	0	0	0
2023	UCF	JR	13	27	17	10	10.5	7.5	0	0	0	0	1	0	0	0	0
2024	UCF	JR	11	15	12	3	6.0	5.0	0	0	0	0	1	1	1	0	0
2025	UCF	SR	12	28	17	11	11.0	7.0	0	0	0	0	3	2	0	0	0
Career			39	72	47	25	28.0	20.0	0	0	0	0	5	3	1	0	0

== Professional career ==
Pre-draft measurables
Height	Weight	Arm length	Hand span	Wingspan	40-yard dash	10-yard split	20-yard split	Vertical jump	Broad jump
6 ft 4 3/8 in (1.94 m)	253 lb (115 kg)	33 5/8 in (0.85 m)	9 1/4 in (0.23 m)	6 ft 9 5/8 in (2.07 m)	4.52 s	1.59 s	2.64 s	40.0 in (1.02 m)	10 ft 10 in (3.30 m)
All values from NFL Combine

Lawrence was selected in the first round, 23rd overall, by the Dallas Cowboys in the 2026 NFL draft.
