= Justin Beriault =

American football player (born 1981)

No. 40
- Position: Safety

Personal information
- Born: August 23, 1981 (age 45); Indianapolis, Indiana, U.S.
- Listed height: 6 ft 3 in (1.91 m)
- Listed weight: 210 lb (95 kg)

Career information
- High school: Warren Central (Indianapolis)
- College: Ball State
- NFL draft: 2005: 6th round, 208th overall pick

Career history
- Dallas Cowboys (2005)

Awards and highlights
- Freshman All-American (2001); 2× All-MAC (2003, 2004); Second-team All-MAC (2002)

Arthur Justin Beriault (born August 23, 1981) is an American former professional football safety in the National Football League (NFL) for the Dallas Cowboys. He played college football at Ball State University.

== Early life ==
Beriault was a three-sport athlete at Warren Central High School. As a senior in football, he collected 112 tackles, 4 interceptions, one fumble recovery, 21 receptions for 468 yards and 5 touchdowns.

He finished his prep career with 242 tackles, 7 interceptions, 4 fumble recoveries, 35 receptions for 710 yards and 7 touchdowns. He also practiced basketball and baseball.

== College career ==
Beriault accepted a football scholarship from Ball State University. As a redshirt freshman, he was a starter at outside linebacker making 117 tackles (led the team), 77 solo tackles, 2 tackles for loss, one interception and 3 passes defensed. Against Auburn University, he had 13 tackles. Against the University of Northern Iowa, he made 14 tackles. Against Central Michigan University, he had 15 tackles.

As a sophomore, he started 12 games, posting 121 tackles (second on the team), 6 tackles for loss, 2 passes defensed, one interception and 2 forced fumbles. Against Clemson University, he had 11 tackles. Against Western Michigan University, he made 14 tackles. Against Marshall University, he had 14 tackles.

As a junior, he was converted into a strong safety. He started 11 out of 12 games, tallying 145 tackles (led the team), 6 tackles for loss, 6 passes defensed, 2 forced fumbles and one interception, while receiving All-MAC recognition. Against the University of Missouri, he had 16 tackles and one pass defensed. Against Boston College, he made 15 tackles and one pass defensed.

As a senior, he ranked 10th in the nation with 125 tackles (led the team), 64 solo tackles, 5 tackles for loss, one interception, one fumble recovery, earning All-MAC honors for the second year in a row. Against Boston College, he had 14 tackles. Against the University of Missouri, he made 11 tackles. Against Northern Illinois University, he had 14 tackles (one for loss) and a blocked field goal.

He started 45 of the 46 games and had 508 tackles (267 solo), 4 interceptions, 12 passes defensed, 2 forced fumbles, 2 fumble recoveries and a blocked field goal. At the time he was one of the few defensive players in college football history to record at least 100 tackles in each of his four seasons.

== Professional career ==
Beriault was selected by the Dallas Cowboys in the sixth round (208th overall) of the 2005 NFL draft and gave him Bill Bates' number (40). After playing in several preseason games at strong safety and earning praise from the Cowboys' coaching staff, he suffered a knee injury that forced the Cowboys to place him on the injured reserve list on September 3, 2005. He had a dual surgery performed to repair torn medial and lateral meniscus in his right knee, a procedure thought to be career threatening, because at the time no NFL player had fully recovered from an osteotomy surgery.

The next year, he participated in training camp, but ended up announcing his retirement on August 14, 2006.
