= 2023 Dallas Cowboys season =

64th season in franchise history

- Owner: Jerry Jones
- General manager: Jerry Jones
- Head coach: Mike McCarthy
- Offensive coordinator: Brian Schottenheimer
- Defensive coordinator: Dan Quinn
- Home stadium: AT&T Stadium

Results
- Record: 12–5
- Division place: 1st NFC East
- Playoffs: Lost Wild Card Playoffs (vs. Packers) 32–48
- All-Pros: 9: WR CeeDee Lamb (1st team); RG Zack Martin (1st team); CB DaRon Bland (1st team); K Brandon Aubrey (1st team); QB Dak Prescott (2nd team); LT Tyron Smith (2nd team); LG Tyler Smith (2nd team); LB Micah Parsons (2nd team); P Bryan Anger (2nd team)
- Pro Bowlers: 10: QB Dak Prescott; WR CeeDee Lamb; TE Jake Ferguson; G Zack Martin; G Tyler Smith; DE DeMarcus Lawrence; OLB Micah Parsons; CB DaRon Bland; K Brandon Aubrey; P Bryan Anger

Uniform
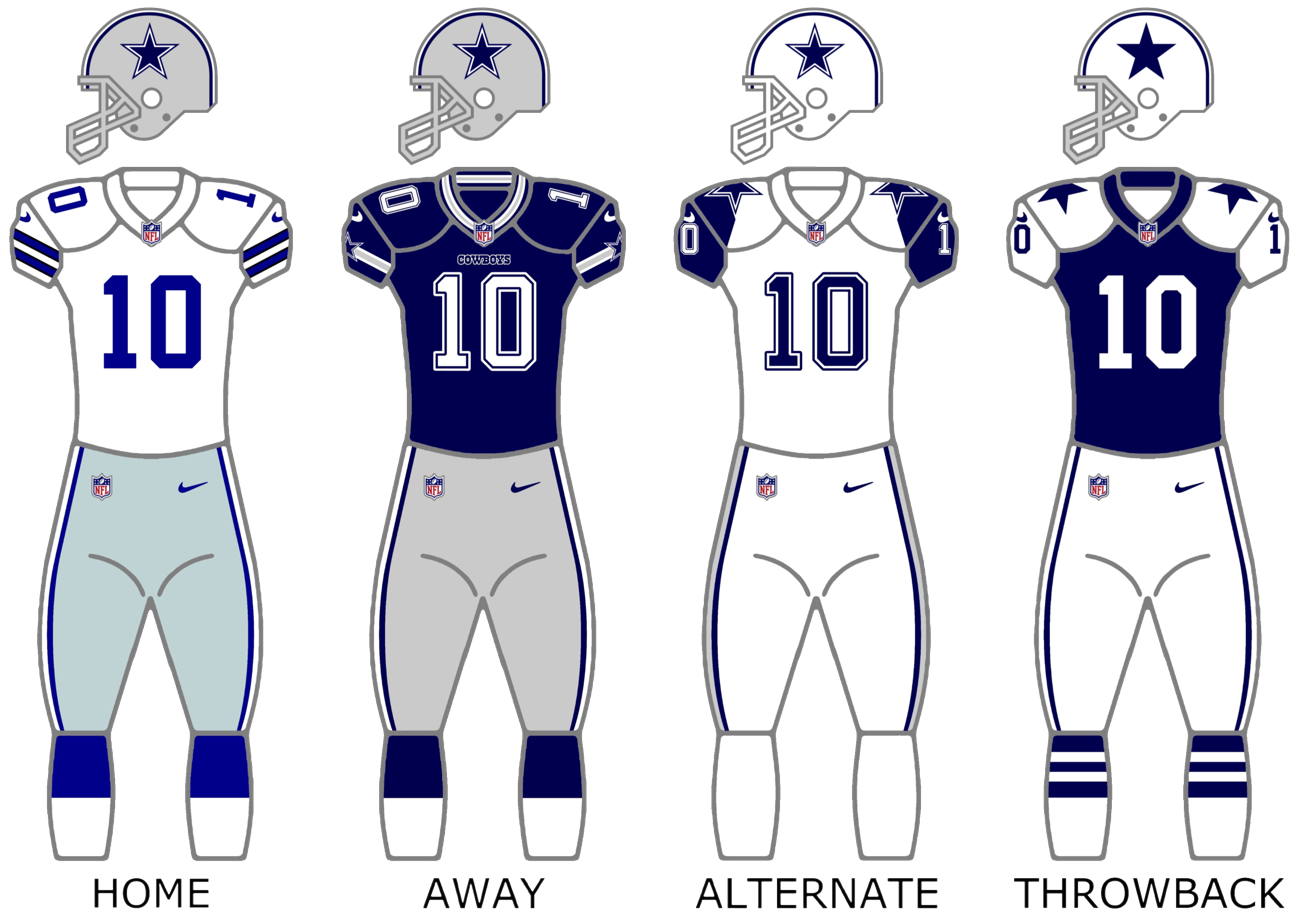

The 2023 season was the Dallas Cowboys' 64th season in the National Football League (NFL), their 35th under the ownership of Jerry Jones, their 15th playing home games at AT&T Stadium, and their fourth under head coach Mike McCarthy. The Cowboys matched their 12–5 record from the previous two seasons and won the NFC East division for the first time since the 2021 season and the second time in three seasons. They ended up in a three-way tie with the San Francisco 49ers and the Detroit Lions for first place in the NFC at 12–5. However, they lost the conference tiebreaker to the 49ers but won the latter tiebreaker over the Lions, giving them the second seed in the playoffs. Although the Cowboys lost to the Buffalo Bills in Week 15, they clinched their third straight playoff berth before taking the field when the Green Bay Packers and Atlanta Falcons lost to the Tampa Bay Buccaneers and Carolina Panthers, respectively. This marked the Cowboys' first run of three consecutive postseason appearances since appearing in six straight from 1991 to 1996.

However, the Cowboys collapsed yet again in the playoffs, and despite having one of the best-ranked offenses and defenses of the league, were beaten in a shocking upset by a final score of 48–32 by their rival, seventh-seeded Green Bay Packers in the Wild Card round, at one point trailing 48–16 during the fourth quarter. With the loss, the Cowboys became the first team to lose a playoff game against a seventh-seeded playoff team since the playoff bracket expanded for the 2020–21 NFL playoffs.

This also marked the first time in NFL history where a team won 12 or more games in three straight seasons, without reaching a conference championship game.

This was the first season since 2015 without running back Ezekiel Elliott on the roster, as he was released on March 15 and signed with the New England Patriots on August 14. As of 2025, this is the most recent season that the Cowboys have made the playoffs, finished the season in first place in the NFC East and finished the season with a winning record.

== Offseason ==
=== Signings ===
Position	Player	Age	2022 team	Contract
RB	Ronald Jones II	26	Kansas City Chiefs	1 year, $1.232 million
G	Chuma Edoga	26	New York Jets	1 year, $1.232 million
LS	Trent Sieg	28	Las Vegas Raiders	1 year, $1.232 million
K	Brandon Aubrey	28	Birmingham Stallions	3 year, $2.695 million

=== Re-signings ===
Position	Player	Age	Contract
QB	Cooper Rush	30	2 years, $6 million
RB	Rico Dowdle	25	1 year, $1 million
DE	Dante Fowler	28	1 year, $3 million
DT	Johnathan Hankins	31	1 year, $1.5 million
MLB	Leighton Vander Esch	27	2 years, $8 million
CB	C. J. Goodwin	33	1 year, $1.3 million
SS	Donovan Wilson	28	3 years, $21 million

=== Trade acquisitions ===
Position	Player	Age	2022 team	Contract	Traded away
QB	Trey Lance	23	San Francisco 49ers	2 years, $16 million	2024 fourth-round selection (Malik Mustapha)
WR	Brandin Cooks	29	Houston Texans	2 years, $40 million	2023 fifth-round selection (Nick Hampton) and 2024 sixth-round selection (Jaden Crumedy)
CB	Stephon Gilmore	32	Indianapolis Colts	1 year, $10 million	2023 fifth-round selection (Evan Hull)
CB	Noah Igbinoghene	24	Miami Dolphins	1 year, $2.1 million	CB Kelvin Joseph

=== Departures ===
Position	Player	Age	2023 team
QB	Will Grier	28	New England Patriots
RB	Ezekiel Elliott	28	New England Patriots
WR	Noah Brown	27	Houston Texans
WR	Simi Fehoko	25	Los Angeles Chargers
WR	T. Y. Hilton	33	Unsigned
TE	Dalton Schultz	26	Houston Texans
OT	Aviante Collins	29	Chicago Bears
OT	Jason Peters	41	Seattle Seahawks
C	Matt Farniok	25	Detroit Lions
C	Connor McGovern	26	Buffalo Bills
DT	Quinton Bohanna	24	Tennessee Titans
DT	Carlos Watkins	29	Arizona Cardinals
LB	Devin Harper	25	Cincinnati Bengals
MLB	Jabril Cox	25	Washington Commanders
OLB	Anthony Barr	30	Minnesota Vikings
OLB	Luke Gifford	28	Tennessee Titans
CB	Anthony Brown	29	New York Jets
CB	Kelvin Joseph	24	Seattle Seahawks
K	Brett Maher	33	Los Angeles Rams
LS	Jake McQuaide	35	Detroit Lions
LS	Matt Overton	37	Chicago Bears

== Draft ==
2023 Dallas Cowboys draft selections
Round	Selection	Player	Position	College	Notes
1	26	Mazi Smith	DT	Michigan	
2	58	Luke Schoonmaker	TE	Michigan	
3	90	DeMarvion Overshown	LB	Texas	
4	129	Viliami Fehoko	DE	San Jose State	
5	161	Traded to the Houston Texans (Note: The Cowboys traded a fifth-round selection (161st overall) and a 2024 sixth-round selection to the Houston Texans in exchange for WR Brandin Cooks.)			
5	169	Asim Richards	OT	North Carolina	Compensatory pick
5	176	Traded to the Indianapolis Colts (Note: The Cowboys traded a fifth-round selection (176th overall) to the Indianapolis Colts in exchange for CB Stephon Gilmore.)			
6	178	Eric Scott Jr.	CB	Southern Miss	From Bears via Dolphins and Chiefs (Note: The Cowboys traded a 2024 fifth-round selection to the Chiefs in exchange for a sixth-round selection (178th overall).)
6	204	Traded to the Las Vegas Raiders (Note: The Cowboys traded a sixth-round selection (204th overall) to the Las Vegas Raiders in exchange for a 2024 seventh-round selection and DT Johnathan Hankins.)			
6	212	Deuce Vaughn	RB	Kansas State	Compensatory pick
7	244	Jalen Brooks	WR	South Carolina	

2023 Dallas Cowboys undrafted free agents
Name	Position	College	Ref.
Jose Barbon	WR	Temple	
T. J. Bass	OT	Oregon	
Earl Bostick Jr.	OT	Kansas	
David Durden	WR	West Florida	
Princeton Fant	TE	Tennessee	
Durrell Johnson	LB	Liberty	
Isaiah Land	DE	Florida A&M	
Hunter Luepke	FB	North Dakota State	
De'Angelo Mandell	CB	BYU	
Jalen Cropper	WR	Fresno State	
John Stephens Jr.	TE	Louisiana	
Tyrus Wheat	OLB	Mississippi State	

Draft trades

== Staff ==
2023 Dallas Cowboys staff
Front office: Owner/president/general manager – Jerry Jones; COO/executive vice president/director of player personnel – Stephen Jones; Senior director of football operations/football administration – Todd Williams; Executive vice president/chief brand officer – Charlotte Jones Anderson; Executive vice president/Chief of sales & marketing for officer – Jerry Jones Jr.; Director of salary cap & player contracts – Adam Prasifka; Vice president player personnel – Will McClay; Director of team travel and logistics – Craig Glieber; Director of football administration and technology – Jason McKay; Scouting department: Director of college scouting – Mitch LaPointe; Director of pro scouting – Alex Loomis; Advance scouting coordinator – Keith O'Quinn; Assistant director of college scouting – Chris Vaughn; College scouting coordinator – Chris Hall; Scouting video coordinator – Rich Behm; Executive assistant to the head coach – Laura Fryar; Head coaches: Head coach – Mike McCarthy; Offensive coaches: Offensive coordinator – Brian Schottenheimer; Quarterbacks – Scott Tolzien; Run game coordinator/running backs – Jeff Blasko; Wide receivers – Robert Prince; Tight ends – Lunda Wells; Assistant tight ends – Chase Haslett; Offensive line – Mike Solari; Quality control/assistant offensive line – Ramon Chinyoung; Offensive assistant/game management – Ryan Feder; Offensive assistant/quality control – Will Harriger; Offensive assistant – Evan Harrington	Defensive coaches: Defensive coordinator – Dan Quinn; Defensive line – Aden Durde; Quality control/assistant defensive line – Sharrif Floyd; Linebackers – Scott McCurley; Quality control/assistant linebackers – Darian Thompson; Secondary/defensive passing game coordinator – Joe Whitt Jr.; Defensive backs – Al Harris; Assistant defensive backs – Cannon Matthews; Quality control/defensive assistant – Pete Ohnegian; Special teams coaches: Special teams coordinator – John Fassel; Assistant special teams – Rayna Stewart; Coaching operations manager/football analytics – Justin Rudd; Quality control/analytics – Eric Simonelli; Strength and conditioning: Strength and conditioning coordinator – Harold Nash; Assistant strength and conditioning – Cedric Smith; Assistant strength and conditioning – Kendall Smith; Strength and conditioning intern – Braylon Tatum

== Rosters ==
=== Opening preseason roster ===
Dallas Cowboys 2023 opening preseason roster
Quarterbacks: 15 Will Grier; 4 Dak Prescott; 10 Cooper Rush; Running backs: 34 Malik Davis; 23 Rico Dowdle; 32 Ronald Jones II; 43 Hunter Luepke FB; 20 Tony Pollard; 42 Deuce Vaughn; Wide receivers: 14 Jose Barbon; 83 Jalen Brooks; 3 Brandin Cooks; 19 Dontario Drummond; 85 David Durden; 81 Simi Fehoko; 13 Michael Gallup; 17 Dennis Houston; 80 Tyron Johnson; 88 CeeDee Lamb; 16 Jalen Cropper; 18 Jalen Tolbert; 9 KaVontae Turpin; Tight ends: 48 Princeton Fant; 87 Jake Ferguson; 47 Seth Green; 89 Peyton Hendershot; 84 Sean McKeon; 86 Luke Schoonmaker; 49 John Stephens Jr.	Offensive linemen: 75 Josh Ball T; 66 T. J. Bass G; 63 Tyler Biadasz C; 64 Earl Bostick Jr. T; 71 Chuma Edoga T; 68 Matt Farniok G/C; 67 Brock Hoffman C; 65 Alec Lindstrom C; 70 Zack Martin G; 76 Asim Richards T; 73 Tyler Smith G/T; 77 Tyron Smith T; 78 Terence Steele T; 69 Alex Taylor T; 79 Matt Waletzko T; Defensive linemen: 60 Isaac Alarcón DT; 92 Dorance Armstrong DE; 94 Ben Banogu DE; 98 Quinton Bohanna DT; 93 Viliami Fehoko DE; 56 Dante Fowler; 96 Neville Gallimore DT; 99 Chauncey Golston DE; 95 Johnathan Hankins DT; 53 Isaiah Land DE; 90 DeMarcus Lawrence DE; 97 Osa Odighizuwa DT; 11 Micah Parsons DE/OLB; 58 Mazi Smith DT; 91 Tyrus Wheat DE; 54 Sam Williams DE	Linebackers: 33 Damone Clark MLB; 14 Jabril Cox OLB/MLB; 50 Devin Harper MLB; 46 Malik Jefferson OLB; 51 Durrell Johnson OLB/DE; 35 DeMarvion Overshown OLB/MLB; 55 Leighton Vander Esch MLB; Defensive backs: 41 Markquese Bell SS/OLB; 26 DaRon Bland CB; 39 Myles Brooks CB; 40 Josh Butler CB; 31 Tyler Coyle FS; 7 Trevon Diggs CB; 21 Stephon Gilmore CB; 29 C. J. Goodwin CB; 28 Malik Hooker FS; 1 Kelvin Joseph CB; 27 Jayron Kearse SS; 2 Jourdan Lewis CB; 38 D'Angelo Mandell CB; 24 Israel Mukuamu FS/CB; 45 Sheldrick Redwine SS/FS; 37 Eric Scott Jr. CB; 30 Juanyeh Thomas FS/SS; 6 Donovan Wilson SS; 25 Nahshon Wright CB; Special teams: 5 Bryan Anger P; 1 Brandon Aubrey K; 47 Trent Sieg LS	Reserve lists: Vacant; 89 active, 0 inactive

=== Week one roster ===
Dallas Cowboys 2023 week one roster
Quarterbacks: 15 Trey Lance; 4 Dak Prescott; 10 Cooper Rush; Running backs: 23 Rico Dowdle; 40 Hunter Luepke FB; 20 Tony Pollard; 42 Deuce Vaughn; Wide receivers: 83 Jalen Brooks; 3 Brandin Cooks; 13 Michael Gallup; 88 CeeDee Lamb; 18 Jalen Tolbert; 9 KaVontae Turpin; Tight ends: 87 Jake Ferguson; 89 Peyton Hendershot; 86 Luke Schoonmaker	Offensive linemen: 66 T. J. Bass G; 63 Tyler Biadasz C; 71 Chuma Edoga T/G; 70 Zack Martin G; 76 Asim Richards T; 73 Tyler Smith G/T; 77 Tyron Smith T; 78 Terence Steele T; Defensive linemen: 92 Dorance Armstrong DE; 93 Viliami Fehoko DE; 56 Dante Fowler DE; 96 Neville Gallimore DT; 99 Chauncey Golston DT/DE; 95 Johnathan Hankins DT; 90 DeMarcus Lawrence DE; 97 Osa Odighizuwa DT; 11 Micah Parsons DE/OLB; 58 Mazi Smith DT; 54 Sam Williams DE	Linebackers: 14 Markquese Bell OLB/SS; 33 Damone Clark MLB; 50 Devin Harper OLB/MLB; 55 Leighton Vander Esch MLB; Defensive backs: 26 DaRon Bland CB; 7 Trevon Diggs CB; 21 Stephon Gilmore CB; 28 Malik Hooker FS; 19 Noah Igbinoghene CB; 1 Jayron Kearse SS; 2 Jourdan Lewis CB; 24 Israel Mukuamu SS/FS; 37 Eric Scott Jr. CB; 30 Juanyeh Thomas FS/SS; 6 Donovan Wilson SS; Special teams: 5 Bryan Anger P; 17 Brandon Aubrey K; 44 Trent Sieg LS	Reserve lists: 75 Josh Ball T (IR); 85 David Durden WR (IR); 32 Ronald Jones II (Suspended) RB; 35 DeMarvion Overshown MLB (IR); 81 John Stephens Jr. TE (IR); 79 Matt Waletzko T (IR); 25 Nahshon Wright CB (IR); Practice squad: 64 Earl Bostick Jr. T; 31 Josh Butler CB; 34 Malik Davis RB; 48 Princeton Fant TE; 29 C. J. Goodwin CB; 65 Sean Harlow C; 67 Brock Hoffman C; 46 Malik Jefferson OLB; 51 Durrell Johnson OLB/DE; 80 Tyron Johnson WR; 84 Sean McKeon TE; 16 Jalen Cropper WR; 94 Willington Previlon DT; 27 Sheldrick Redwine SS/FS; 69 Alex Taylor T; 91 Tyrus Wheat DE; 53 active, 7 inactive, 16 practice squad

=== Final roster ===
2023 Dallas Cowboys roster
Quarterbacks (QB): 15 Trey Lance; 4 Dak Prescott; 10 Cooper Rush; Running backs (RB): 23 Rico Dowdle; 40 Hunter Luepke; 20 Tony Pollard; Wide receivers (WR): 83 Jalen Brooks; 3 Brandin Cooks; 13 Michael Gallup; 88 CeeDee Lamb; 18 Jalen Tolbert; 9 KaVontae Turpin; Tight ends (TE): 87 Jake Ferguson; 89 Peyton Hendershot; 86 Luke Schoonmaker	Offensive linemen (OL): 66 T. J. Bass G; 63 Tyler Biadasz C; 71 Chuma Edoga T/G; 67 Brock Hoffman C/G; 70 Zack Martin G; 76 Asim Richards T; 73 Tyler Smith G; 77 Tyron Smith T; 78 Terence Steele T; 79 Matt Waletzko T; Defensive linemen (DL): 92 Dorance Armstrong DE; 93 Viliami Fehoko DE; 56 Dante Fowler DE; 96 Neville Gallimore DT; 99 Chauncey Golston DE; 95 Johnathan Hankins DT; 90 DeMarcus Lawrence DE; 97 Osa Odighizuwa DT; 58 Mazi Smith DT; 91 Tyrus Wheat DE; 54 Sam Williams DE	Linebackers (LB): 14 Markquese Bell OLB; 33 Damone Clark MLB; 11 Micah Parsons OLB; Defensive backs (DB): 26 DaRon Bland CB; 28 Malik Hooker FS; 21 Stephon Gilmore CB; 19 Noah Igbinoghene CB; 1 Jayron Kearse SS; 2 Jourdan Lewis CB; 24 Israel Mukuamu FS/SS; 37 Eric Scott Jr. CB; 30 Juanyeh Thomas FS/SS; 6 Donovan Wilson SS/FS; 25 Nahshon Wright CB; Special teams (ST): 5 Bryan Anger P; 17 Brandon Aubrey K; 44 Trent Sieg LS	Practice squad: 64 Earl Bostick Jr. T; 31 Josh Butler CB; 72 La'el Collins T/G; 98 Carl Davis DT; 34 Malik Davis RB; 48 Princeton Fant TE; 46 Malik Jefferson OLB; 57 Buddy Johnson MLB; 51 Durrell Johnson DE; 80 Racey McMath WR; 16 Jalen Moreno-Cropper WR; 69 Billy Price C; 20 Sheldrick Redwine SS; 65 Dakoda Shepley T; 36 SaRodorick Thompson RB; 45 Damien Wilson OLB; Reserve: 75 Josh Ball T (IR); 7 Trevon Diggs CB (IR); 85 David Durden WR (IR); 29 C. J. Goodwin CB (IR); 84 Sean McKeon TE (IR); 35 DeMarvion Overshown OLB (IR); 81 John Stephens Jr. TE (IR); 42 Deuce Vaughn RB (IR); 55 Leighton Vander Esch OLB (IR); Rookies in italics 53 active, 9 reserve, 16 practice squad

== Preseason ==
Week	Date	Opponent	Result	Record	Venue	Recap
1	August 12	Jacksonville Jaguars	L 23–28	0–1	AT&T Stadium	Recap
2	August 19	at Seattle Seahawks	L 14–22	0–2	Lumen Field	Recap
3	August 26	Las Vegas Raiders	W 31–16	1–2	AT&T Stadium	Recap

== Regular season ==
=== Schedule ===
Week	Date	Opponent	Result	Record	Venue	Recap
1	September 10	at **New York Giants**	**W** 40–0	1–0	MetLife Stadium	Recap
2	September 17	New York Jets	**W** 30–10	2–0	AT&T Stadium	Recap
3	September 24	at Arizona Cardinals	**L** 16–28	2–1	State Farm Stadium	Recap
4	October 1	New England Patriots	**W** 38–3	3–1	AT&T Stadium	Recap
5	October 8	at San Francisco 49ers	**L** 10–42	3–2	Levi's Stadium	Recap
6	October 16	at Los Angeles Chargers	**W** 20–17	4–2	SoFi Stadium	Recap
7	Bye					
8	October 29	Los Angeles Rams	**W** 43–20	5–2	AT&T Stadium	Recap
9	November 5	at **Philadelphia Eagles**	**L** 23–28	5–3	Lincoln Financial Field	Recap
10	November 12	**New York Giants**	**W** 49–17	6–3	AT&T Stadium	Recap
11	November 19	at Carolina Panthers	**W** 33–10	7–3	Bank of America Stadium	Recap
12	November 23	**Washington Commanders**	**W** 45–10	8–3	AT&T Stadium	Recap
13	November 30	Seattle Seahawks	**W** 41–35	9–3	AT&T Stadium	Recap
14	December 10	**Philadelphia Eagles**	**W** 33–13	10–3	AT&T Stadium	Recap
15	December 17	at Buffalo Bills	**L** 10–31	10–4	Highmark Stadium	Recap
16	December 24	at Miami Dolphins	**L** 20–22	10–5	Hard Rock Stadium	Recap
17	December 30	Detroit Lions	**W** 20–19	11–5	AT&T Stadium	Recap
18	January 7	at **Washington Commanders**	**W** 38–10	12–5	FedExField	Recap

Note: Intra-division opponents are in bold text.

=== Game summaries ===
==== Week 1: at New York Giants ====
Week 1: Dallas Cowboys at New York Giants – Game summary

Quarter	1	2	3	4	Total
**Cowboys**	16	10	7	7	**40**
Giants	0	0	0	0	**0**

at MetLife Stadium, East Rutherford, New Jersey

- Date: September 10
- Game time: 8:20 p.m. EDT/7:20 p.m. CDT
- Game weather: Rain, 74 °F (23 °C)
- Game attendance: 80,809
- Referee: Adrian Hill
- TV announcers (NBC): Mike Tirico, Cris Collinsworth and Melissa Stark
- Recap, Game Book

Game information

**First quarter**

- DAL – Noah Igbinoghene 58-yard blocked field goal return (kick failed, wide left), 8:03. Cowboys 6–0.
- DAL – Brandon Aubrey 21-yard field goal, 3:21. Cowboys 9–0. **Drive: 9 plays, 72 yards, 3:45.**
- DAL – DaRon Bland 22-yard interception return (Brandon Aubrey kick), 2:22. Cowboys 16–0.

**Second quarter**

- DAL – Brandon Aubrey 38-yard field goal, 10:55. Cowboys 19–0. **Drive: 11 plays, 60 yards, 4:26.**
- DAL – Tony Pollard 2-yard rush (Brandon Aubrey kick), 8:03. Cowboys 26–0. **Drive: 5 plays, 38 yards, 2:45.**

**Third quarter**

- DAL – Tony Pollard 1-yard rush (Brandon Aubrey kick), 10:01. Cowboys 33–0. **Drive: 10 plays, 75 yards, 4:59.**

**Fourth quarter**

- DAL – KaVontae Turpin 7-yard rush (Brandon Aubrey kick), 11:31. Cowboys 40–0. **Drive: 8 plays, 50 yards, 3:29.**

**Top passers**

- DAL – Dak Prescott – 13/24, 143 yards
- NYG – Daniel Jones – 15/28, 104 yards, 2 INT

**Top rushers**

- DAL – Tony Pollard – 14 rushes, 70 yards, 2 TD
- NYG – Saquon Barkley – 12 rushes, 51 yards

**Top receivers**

- DAL – CeeDee Lamb – 4 receptions, 77 yards
- NYG – Darren Waller – 3 receptions, 36 yards

The Cowboys started the season by traveling to MetLife Stadium to face one of their longtime NFC East rivals: the New York Giants.

In rain-soaked conditions, they demolished the Giants 40–0, on the back of a stellar defensive performance and two touchdowns from Tony Pollard. The Cowboys defense returned a blocked field goal for a touchdown in the first quarter, had two interceptions (returning one for a touchdown), and recorded a total of seven sacks during the game on the Giants quarterback Daniel Jones as they posted their first shutout win since 2017.

With the shutout win, the Cowboys started the season 1–0 for the first time since 2019.

==== Week 2: vs. New York Jets ====
Week 2: New York Jets at Dallas Cowboys – Game summary

Quarter	1	2	3	4	Total
Jets	0	10	0	0	**10**
**Cowboys**	7	11	6	6	**30**

at AT&T Stadium, Arlington, Texas

- Date: September 17
- Game time: 3:25 p.m. CDT
- Game weather: None (retractable roof closed)
- Game attendance: 93,689
- Referee: Clete Blakeman
- TV announcers (CBS): Jim Nantz, Tony Romo and Tracy Wolfson
- Recap, Game Book

Game information

**First quarter**

- DAL – Jake Ferguson 4-yard pass from Dak Prescott (Brandon Aubrey kick), 9:19. Cowboys 7–0. **Drive: 12 plays, 75 yards, 5:41.**

**Second quarter**

- DAL – Brandon Aubrey 35-yard field goal, 9:10. Cowboys 10–0. **Drive: 14 plays, 78 yards, 6:44.**
- NYJ – Garrett Wilson 68-yard pass from Zach Wilson (Austin Seibert kick), 7:12. Cowboys 10–7. **Drive: 1 play, 68 yards, 0:09.**
- DAL – Luke Schoonmaker 1-yard pass from Dak Prescott (Tony Pollard run), 1:52. Cowboys 18–7. **Drive: 13 plays, 75 yards, 5:20.**
- NYJ – Austin Seibert 34-yard field goal, 0:04. Cowboys 18–10. **Drive: 11 plays, 59 yards, 1:48.**

**Third quarter**

- DAL – Brandon Aubrey 21-yard field goal, 7:24. Cowboys 21–10. **Drive: 12 plays, 55 yards, 5:52.**
- DAL – Brandon Aubrey 55-yard field goal, 5:19. Cowboys 24–10. **Drive: 4 plays, 1 yard, 1:22.**

**Fourth quarter**

- DAL – Brandon Aubrey 26-yard field goal, 12:23. Cowboys 27–10. **Drive: 12 plays, 71 yards, 6:21.**
- DAL – Brandon Aubrey 30-yard field goal, 8:18. Cowboys 30–10. **Drive: 6 plays, 5 yards, 3:18.**

**Top passers**

- NYJ – Zach Wilson – 10/22, 154 yards, TD, 3 INT
- DAL – Dak Prescott – 30/37, 249 yards, 2 TD

**Top rusher'**

- NYJ – Zach Wilson – 5 rushes, 36 yards
- DAL – Tony Pollard – 22 rushes, 66 yards

**Top receiver**

- NYJ – Garrett Wilson – 2 receptions, 83 yards, TD
- DAL – CeeDee Lamb – 11 receptions, 143 yards

After a raging shutout win over the New York Giants, the Dallas Cowboys went back home to face New York's other NFL team, the New York Jets. The Cowboys benefitted from the Jets having to start Zach Wilson because of Aaron Rodgers injuring his Achilles' tendon the week before. Dallas scored the only points of the first quarter, with Dak Prescott hitting Jake Ferguson with a 4-yard touchdown pass to put the Cowboys up, 7–0.

In the second quarter, Brandon Aubrey extended the Cowboys' lead to 10–0 upon booting a 35-yard field goal. However, they allowed Zach Wilson to pass for his only touchdown of the game by hitting Garrett Wilson with a 68-yard touchdown pass to drop the Cowboys' lead to three points. But the Cowboys wouldn't go away, as Dak Prescott hit Luke Schoonmaker with a 1-yard touchdown pass with the two-point conversion to put Dallas up by 11. With 4 seconds until halftime, the Jets scored their final points, with Austin Seibert booting a 34-yard field goal to bring New York within eight.

The second half belonged to Brandon Aubrey, as he booted 4 field goals, with 2 coming in the 3rd quarter, and the other two coming in the 4th, to reach the final score of 30–10.

The Cowboys' defense thoroughly harassed Zach Wilson, intercepting him 3 times and sacking him 3 times for 19 yards.

With the win, the Cowboys improved to 2–0, and won their first game against the Jets since 2007.

Mr. Blue Sky by Electric Light Orchestra was played as the game concluded.

==== Week 3: at Arizona Cardinals ====
Week 3: Dallas Cowboys at Arizona Cardinals – Game summary

Quarter	1	2	3	4	Total
Cowboys	3	7	3	3	**16**
**Cardinals**	9	12	0	7	**28**

at State Farm Stadium, Glendale, Arizona

- Date: September 24
- Game time: 3:25 p.m. CDT/1:25 p.m. MST
- Game weather: None (retractable roof closed)
- Game attendance: 62,915
- Referee: Alex Kemp
- TV announcers (Fox): Joe Davis, Daryl Johnston and Pam Oliver
- Recap, Game Book

Game information

**First quarter**

- ARI – Matt Prater 39-yard field goal, 12:31. Cardinals 3–0. **Drive: 6 plays, 54 yards, 2:29.**
- ARI – James Conner 5-yard run (run failed), 6:12. Cardinals 9–0. **Drive: 7 plays, 82 yards, 3:49.**
- DAL – Brandon Aubrey 49-yard field goal, 1:48. Cardinals 9–3. **Drive: 10 plays, 44 yards, 4:24.**

**Second quarter**

- ARI – Rondale Moore 45-yard run (pass failed), 12:31. Cardinals 15–3. **Drive: 7 plays, 75 yards, 4:17.**
- DAL – Rico Dowdle 15-yard pass from Dak Prescott (Brandon Aubrey kick), 5:32. Cardinals 15–10. **Drive: 13 play, 75 yards, 6:59.**
- ARI – Matt Prater 43-yard field goal, 1:28. Cardinals 18–10. **Drive: 10 plays, 50 yards, 4:04.**
- ARI – Matt Prater 62-yard field goal, 0:00. Cardinals 21–10. **Drive: 5 plays, 27 yards, 0:25.**

**Third quarter**

- DAL – Brandon Aubrey 27-yard field goal, 9:27. Cardinals 21–13. **Drive: 13 plays, 67 yards, 5:33.**

**Fourth quarter**

- DAL – Brandon Aubrey 26-yard field goal, 9:33. Cardinals 21–16. **Drive: 12 plays, 56 yards, 5:20.**
- ARI – Marquise Brown 2-yard pass from Joshua Dobbs (Matt Prater kick), 7:22. Cardinals 28–16. **Drive: 4 plays, 76 yards, 2:11.**

**Top passers**

- DAL – Dak Prescott – 25/40, 249 yards, TD, INT
- ARI – Joshua Dobbs – 17/21, 189 yards, TD

**Top rusher'**

- DAL – Tony Pollard – 23 rushes, 122 yards
- ARI – James Conner – 14 rushes, 98 yards, TD

**Top receiver**

- DAL – Michael Gallup – 6 receptions, 92 yards
- ARI – Michael Wilson – 2 receptions, 86 yards

After two consecutive blowout wins over both New York teams, the Cowboys traveled to State Farm Stadium, hoping to give the Arizona Cardinals their 10th consecutive loss dating back to last season. Despite intercepting 5 passes in the previous two games, the Cowboys defense struggled throughout the game and could not intercept Cardinals' quarterback Joshua Dobbs at all. After falling into a 15–3 hole in the second quarter, Dallas failed to rebound, ultimately losing 28–16, and extending their losing streak against the Cardinals to three games. With the upset loss, the Cowboys fell to 2–1, and allowed their division rival Eagles to take sole possession of the division lead after their win the following night over the Buccaneers. Additionally, it was Dak Prescott's first game of the season throwing an interception.

==== Week 4: vs. New England Patriots ====
Week 4: New England Patriots at Dallas Cowboys – Game summary

Quarter	1	2	3	4	Total
Patriots	3	0	0	0	**3**
**Cowboys**	10	18	3	7	**38**

at AT&T Stadium, Arlington, Texas

- Date: October 1
- Game time: 3:25 p.m. CDT
- Game weather: None (retractable roof closed)
- Game attendance: 93,719
- Referee: Scott Novak
- TV announcers (Fox): Kevin Burkhardt, Greg Olsen, Erin Andrews and Tom Rinaldi
- Recap, Game Book

Game information

**First quarter**

- DAL – Brandon Aubrey 23-yard field goal, 10:52. Cowboys 3-0. **Drive: 10 plays, 70 yards, 4:08.**
- NE – Chad Ryland 29-yard field goal, 6:41. Tied 3-3. **Drive: 8 plays, 64 yards, 4:11.**
- DAL – CeeDee Lamb 20-yard pass from Dak Prescott (Brandon Aubrey kick), 1:30. Cowboys 10-3. **Drive: 10 plays, 75 yards, 5:11.**

**Second quarter**

- DAL – Leighton Vander Esch 11-yard fumble return (Brian Anger-Chauncey Golston pass), 11:09. Cowboys 18-3.
- DAL – Brandon Aubrey 23-yard field goal, 4:03. Cowboys 21-3. **Drive: 11 plays, 73 yards, 5:33.**
- DAL – DaRon Bland 54-yard interception return (Brandon Aubrey kick), 0:54. Cowboys 28-3.

**Third quarter**

- DAL – Brandon Aubrey 33-yard field goal, 7:42. Cowboys 31-3. **Drive: 10 plays, 37 yards, 4:01.**

**Fourth quarter**

- DAL – Hunter Luepke 3-yard run (Brandon Aubrey kick), 6:38. Cowboys 38-3. **Drive: 7 plays, 63 yards, 4:21.**

**Top passers**

- NE – Mac Jones – 12/21, 150 yards, 2 INT
- DAL – Dak Prescott – 28/34, 261 yards, TD

**Top rushers**

- NE – Rhamondre Stevenson – 14 rushes, 30 yards
- DAL – Tony Pollard – 11 rushes, 47 yards

**Top receivers**

- NE – Hunter Henry – 4 receptions, 51 yards
- DAL – Jake Ferguson – 7 receptions, 77 yards

After a loss to the Arizona Cardinals, the Cowboys went back home to face the New England Patriots. This was Ezekiel Elliott's return to AT&T Stadium for the first time since being released from the Cowboys. He played 7 seasons with the Cowboys from 2016 to 2022. He will, however, return to the Cowboys in 2024. The Cowboys dominated from start to finish against Bill Belichick and the Patriots. Leighton Vander Esch scored the first defensive touchdown of his career on an 11-yard fumble recovery.

With the win, the Cowboys improved to 3–1, and gave Belichick his worst loss as a head coach.

==== Week 5: at San Francisco 49ers ====
Week 5: Dallas Cowboys at San Francisco 49ers – Game summary

Quarter	1	2	3	4	Total
Cowboys	0	7	3	0	**10**
**49ers**	7	14	7	14	**42**

at Levi's Stadium, Santa Clara, California

- Date: October 8
- Game time: 7:20 p.m. CDT/5:20 p.m. PDT
- Game weather: Sunny, 78 °F (26 °C)
- Game attendance: 71,617
- Referee: Alan Eck
- TV announcers (NBC): Mike Tirico, Cris Collinsworth and Melissa Stark
- Recap, Game Book

Game information

**First quarter**

- SF – George Kittle 19-yard pass from Brock Purdy (Jake Moody kick), 11:10. 49ers 7–0. **Drive: 7 plays, 75 yards, 3:50.**

**Second quarter**

- SF – George Kittle 38-yard pass from Brock Purdy (Jake Moody kick), 13:16. 49ers 14–0. **Drive: 1 play, 38 yards, 0:10.**
- DAL – KaVontae Turpin 26-yard pass from Dak Prescott (Brandon Aubrey kick), 7:45. 49ers 14–7. **Drive: 11 plays, 78 yards, 5:31.**
- SF – Christian McCaffrey 1-yard run (Jake Moody kick), 2:36. 49ers 21–7. **Drive: 9 plays, 75 yards, 5:09.**

**Third quarter**

- DAL – Brandon Aubrey 50-yard field goal,11:53. 49ers 21–10. **Drive: 6 plays, 39 yards, 3:07.**
- SF – George Kittle 10-yard pass from Brock Purdy (Jake Moody kick), 7:20. 49ers 28–10. **Drive: 7 plays, 75 yards, 4:33.**

**Fourth quarter**

- SF – Kyle Juszczyk 1-yard pass from Brock Purdy (Jake Moody kick), 14:19. 49ers 35–10. **Drive: 12 plays, 62 yards, 6:42.**
- SF – Jordan Mason 26-yard run (Jake Moody kick), 13:59. 49ers 42–10. **Drive: 1 play, 26 yards, 0:06.**

**Top passers**

- DAL – Dak Prescott – 14/24, 153 yards, TD, 3 INT
- SF – Brock Purdy – 17/24, 252 yards, 4 TD

**Top rushers**

- DAL – Tony Pollard – 8 rushes, 29 yards
- SF – Jordan Mason – 10 rushes, 69 yards, TD

**Top receivers**

- DAL – CeeDee Lamb – 4 receptions, 49 yards
- SF – George Kittle – 3 receptions, 67 yards, 3 TD

In one of the most highly anticipated matchups of the season, the Cowboys traveled to San Francisco to face the undefeated 49ers in a rematch of the previous season's Divisional Round meeting, which San Francisco won, 19–12. The Cowboys were dominated on both sides of the ball from start to finish in the 42–10 loss, their third straight to the 49ers. Dak Prescott tied a career worst by throwing three interceptions, and the defense allowed 421 total yards. Dallas dropped to 3–2 on the season with the blowout loss.

==== Week 6: at Los Angeles Chargers ====
Week 6: Dallas Cowboys at Los Angeles Chargers – Game summary

Quarter	1	2	3	4	Total
**Cowboys**	7	3	0	10	**20**
Chargers	7	0	3	7	**17**

at SoFi Stadium, Inglewood, California

- Date: October 16
- Game time: 7:15 p.m. CDT/5:15 p.m. PDT
- Game weather: Clear, 74 °F (23 °C) (retractable roof open)
- Game attendance: 70,240
- Referee: Land Clark
- TV announcers (ESPN/ABC): Joe Buck, Troy Aikman and Lisa Salters
- Recap, Game Book

Game information

**First quarter**

- LAC – Keenan Allen 1-yard pass from Justin Herbert (Cameron Dicker kick), 10:31. Chargers 7–0. **Drive: 5 plays, 42 yards, 2:23.**
- DAL – Dak Prescott 18-yard run (Brandon Aubrey kick), 6:21. Tied 7–7. **Drive: 9 plays, 75 yards, 4:10.**

**Second quarter**

- DAL – Brandon Aubrey 32-yard field goal, 0:00. Cowboys 10–7. **Drive: 6 plays, 57 yards, 0:59.**

**Third quarter**

- LAC – Cameron Dicker 24-yard field goal, 1:08. Tied 10–10. **Drive: 10 plays, 43 yards, 5:02.**

**Fourth quarter**

- DAL – Brandin Cooks 2-yard pass from Dak Prescott (Brandon Aubrey kick), 11:19. Cowboys 17–10. **Drive: 8 plays, 75 yards, 4:49.**
- LAC – Gerald Everett 1-yard pass from Justin Herbert (Cameron Dicker kick), 7:11. Tied 17–17. **Drive: 4 plays, 20 yards, 1:30.**
- DAL – Brandon Aubrey 39-yard field goal, 2:19. Cowboys 20–17. **Drive: 14 plays, 54 yards, 4:52.**

**Top passers**

- DAL – Dak Prescott – 21/30, 272 yards, TD
- LAC – Justin Herbert – 22/37, 227 yards, 2 TD, INT

**Top rushers**

- DAL – Dak Prescott – 7 rushes, 40 yards, TD
- LAC – Austin Ekeler – 14 rushes, 27 yards

**Top receivers**

- DAL – CeeDee Lamb – 7 receptions, 117 yards
- LAC – Keenan Allen – 7 receptions, 85 yards, TD

The Cowboys traveled to SoFi Stadium to take on Justin Herbert and the Kellen Moore-led Chargers. Moore had been the Cowboys' offensive coordinator between 2019 and 2022. The Cowboys and the Chargers exchanged points throughout the game, including a point when Jalen Tolbert muffed a catch that led to a Chargers touchdown. The Cowboys responded by kicking a field goal to make the game 20–17, which proved to be the final score. The score drew a coincidence to the 2021 season when the Cowboys and Chargers played each other, which was also a 20–17 Cowboys win over the Chargers. The Cowboys defense stood tall in the final minutes of the game, with Micah Parsons sacking Justin Herbert, with Stephon Gilmore intercepting Herbert to seal the Cowboys win. The win improved the Cowboys to 4–2 on the season.

==== Week 8: vs. Los Angeles Rams ====
Week 8: Los Angeles Rams at Dallas Cowboys – Game summary

Quarter	1	2	3	4	Total
Rams	3	6	8	3	**20**
**Cowboys**	17	16	3	7	**43**

at AT&T Stadium, Arlington, Texas

- Date: October 29
- Game time: 12:00 p.m. CDT
- Game weather: None (retractable roof closed)
- Game attendance: 93,448
- Referee: Adrian Hill
- TV announcers (Fox): Kevin Burkhardt, Greg Olsen, Erin Andrews and Tom Rinaldi
- Recap, Game Book

Game information

**First quarter**

- DAL – Jake Ferguson 18-yard pass from Dak Prescott (Brandon Aubrey kick), 9:44. Cowboys 7–0. **Drive: 10 plays, 75 yards, 5:16.**
- LAR – Lucas Havrisik 33-yard field goal, 5:22. Cowboys 7–3. **Drive: 10 plays, 60 yards, 4:22.**
- DAL – Brandon Aubrey 58-yard field goal, 0:43. Cowboys 10–3. **Drive: 9 plays, 35 yards, 4:39.**
- DAL – DaRon Bland 30-yard interception return (Brandon Aubrey kick), 0:36. Cowboys 17–3.

**Second quarter**

- DAL – Punt blocked by Sam Williams out of bounds in end zone for a Safety, 13:39. Cowboys 19–3.
- DAL – CeeDee Lamb 10-yard pass from Dak Prescott (Brandon Aubrey kick), 12:45. Cowboys 26–3. **Drive: 2 plays, 13 yards, 0:54.**
- DAL – CeeDee Lamb 22-yard pass from Dak Prescott (Brandon Aubrey kick), 2:27. Cowboys 33–3. **Drive: 5 plays, 63 yards, 2:41.**
- LAR – Royce Freeman 1-yard run (pass failed), 0:04. Cowboys 33–9. **Drive: 12 plays, 75 yards, 2:23.**

**Third quarter**

- LAR – Ben Skowronek 20-yard pass from Matthew Stafford (Tutu Atwell–Matthew Stafford pass), 11:29. Cowboys 33–17. **Drive: 7 plays, 75 yards, 3:31.**
- DAL – Brandon Aubrey 27-yard field goal, 1:32. Cowboys 36–17. **Drive: 17 plays, 75 yards, 9:57.**

**Fourth quarter**

- DAL – Brandin Cooks 25-yard pass from Dak Prescott (Brandon Aubrey kick), 12:19. Cowboys 43–17. **Drive: 3 plays, 54 yards, 1:00.**
- LAR – Lucas Havrisik 47-yard field goal, 5:31. Cowboys 43–20. **Drive: 7 plays, 25 yards, 2:48.**

**Top passers**

- LAR – Matthew Stafford – 13/22, 162 yards, TD, INT
- DAL – Dak Prescott – 25/31, 304 yards, 4 TD, INT

**Top rushers**

- LAR – Royce Freeman – 9 rushes, 44 yards, TD
- DAL – Tony Pollard – 12 rushes, 53 yards

**Top receivers**

- LAR – Tyler Higbee – 5 receptions, 45 yards
- DAL – CeeDee Lamb – 12 receptions, 158 yards, 2 TD

==== Week 9: at Philadelphia Eagles ====
Week 9: Dallas Cowboys at Philadelphia Eagles – Game summary

Quarter	1	2	3	4	Total
Cowboys	7	10	0	6	**23**
**Eagles**	7	7	14	0	**28**

at Lincoln Financial Field, Philadelphia, Pennsylvania

- Date: November 5
- Game time: 4:25 p.m. EST/3:25 p.m. CST
- Game weather: Clear, 64 °F (18 °C)
- Game attendance: 69,876
- Referee: Tra Blake
- TV announcers (Fox): Kevin Burkhardt, Greg Olsen, Erin Andrews and Tom Rinaldi
- Recap, Game Book

Game information

**First quarter**

- PHI – Kenneth Gainwell 12-yard run (Jake Elliott kick), 5:46. Eagles 7–0. **Drive: 13 plays, 77 yards, 7:51.**
- DAL – Jake Ferguson 4-yard pass from Dak Prescott (Brandon Aubrey kick), 1:37. Tied 7–7. **Drive: 8 plays, 53 yards, 4:09.**

**Second quarter**

- DAL – KaVontae Turpin 5-yard pass from Dak Prescott (Brandon Aubrey kick), 11:16. Cowboys 14–7. **Drive: 9 plays, 82 yards, 3:49.**
- PHI – Jalen Hurts 1-yard run (Jake Elliott kick), 5:09. Tied 14–14. **Drive: 11 plays, 60 yards, 6:07.**
- DAL – Brandon Aubrey 51-yard field goal, 1:15. Cowboys 17–14. **Drive: 9 plays, 42 yards, 3:54.**

**Third quarter**

- PHI – DeVonta Smith 29-yard pass from Jalen Hurts (Jake Elliott kick), 11:23. Eagles 21–17. **Drive: 6 plays, 60 yards, 3:37.**
- PHI – A. J. Brown 4-yard pass from Jalen Hurts (Jake Elliott kick), 1:13. Eagles 28–17. **Drive: 11 plays, 87 yards, 6:18.**

**Fourth quarter**

- DAL – Jalen Tolbert 7-yard pass from Dak Prescott (run failed), 6:23. Eagles 28–23. **Drive: 5 plays, 52 yards, 2:13.**

**Top passers**

- DAL – Dak Prescott – 29/44, 374 yards, 3 TD
- PHI – Jalen Hurts – 17/23, 207 yards, 2 TD

**Top rushers**

- DAL – Tony Pollard – 12 rushes, 51 yards
- PHI – D'Andre Swift – 18 rushes, 43 yards

**Top receivers**

- DAL – CeeDee Lamb – 11 receptions, 191 yards
- PHI – A. J. Brown – 7 receptions, 66 yards, TD

The Cowboys traveled to Philadelphia to face the league-leading Eagles in a crucial NFC East showdown. After a back-and-forth first half, Dallas took a 17–14 lead into the locker room. However, the Eagles answered with touchdowns on their first two second-half drives to take a 28–17 lead into the fourth quarter. The Cowboys drove to the Eagles' 1-yard line, where Dak Prescott threw a fourth down pass to tight end Luke Schoonmaker; initially ruled a touchdown, replay reviews confirmed that Schoonmaker was downed prior to breaking the plane, turning the ball over on downs. Dallas got a second chance after forcing a three-and-out, and this time cashed in with a Jalen Tolbert touchdown reception. However, Prescott stepped out of bounds on the two-point conversion, making it a 28–23 game. After failing to score on their next drive, the Cowboys got one final chance to take the lead with 46 seconds remaining. Prescott and the Cowboys drove to the 6-yard line in under 20 seconds, thanks to numerous penalties committed by Philadelphia's defense, but two pre-snap penalties by the offense and a costly sack by Josh Sweat moved them back to the 27. On the game's final play, CeeDee Lamb was stopped short of the goal line as time expired and fumbled, sealing the Cowboys' fate. Dallas dropped to 5–3 on the season with the 28–23 loss, and suffered their fourth loss in their past five visits to Philadelphia.

==== Week 10: vs. New York Giants ====
Week 10: New York Giants at Dallas Cowboys – Game summary

Quarter	1	2	3	4	Total
Giants	0	0	7	10	**17**
**Cowboys**	7	21	14	7	**49**

at AT&T Stadium, Arlington, Texas

- Date: November 12
- Game time: 3:25 p.m. CST
- Game weather: None (retractable roof closed)
- Game attendance: 93,338
- Referee: Brad Rogers
- TV announcers (Fox): Kevin Burkhardt, Greg Olsen, Erin Andrews and Tom Rinaldi
- Recap, Game Book

Game information

**First quarter**

- DAL – CeeDee Lamb 14-yard run (Brandon Aubrey kick), 3:38. Cowboys 7–0. **Drive: 5 plays, 46 yards, 1:41.**

**Second quarter**

- DAL – Jake Ferguson 1-yard pass from Dak Prescott (Brandon Aubrey kick), 8:48. Cowboys 14–0. **Drive: 8 plays, 96 yards, 4:35.**
- DAL – Brandin Cooks 10-yard pass from Dak Prescott (Brandon Aubrey kick), 3:48. Cowboys 21–0. **Drive: 6 plays, 54 yards, 2:48.**
- DAL – Dak Prescott 10-yard run (Brandon Aubrey kick), 0:16. Cowboys 28–0. **Drive: 7 plays, 85 yards, 2:31.**

**Third quarter**

- NYG – Lawrence Cager 10-yard pass from Tommy DeVito (Randy Bullock kick), 8:07. Cowboys 28–7. **Drive: 7 plays, 91 yards, 3:29.**
- DAL – Michael Gallup 41-yard pass from Dak Prescott (Brandon Aubrey kick), 4:40. Cowboys 35–7. **Drive: 6 plays, 86 yards, 3:27.**
- DAL – CeeDee Lamb 12-pass from Dak Prescott (Brandon Aubrey kick), 1:29. Cowboys 42–7. **Drive: 8 plays, 77 yards, 3:04.**

**Fourth quarter**

- NYG – Randy Bullock 40-yard field goal, 8:54. Cowboys 42–10. **Drive: 5 plays, 5 yards, 2:02.**
- DAL – Rico Dowdle 1-yard run (Brandon Aubrey kick), 2:14. Cowboys 49–10. **Drive: 11 plays, 75 yards, 6:40.**
- NYG – Sterling Shepard 2-yard pass from Tommy DeVito (Randy Bullock kick), 0:06. Cowboys 49–17. **Drive: 14 plays, 75 yards, 2:08.**

**Top passers**

- NYG – Tommy DeVito – 14/27, 86 yards, 2 TD, INT
- DAL – Dak Prescott – 26/35, 404 yards, 4 TD, INT

**Top rushers**

- NYG – Saquon Barkley – 13 rushes, 66 yards
- DAL – Rico Dowdle – 12 rushes, 79 yards, TD

**Top receivers**

- NYG – Darius Slayton – 3 receptions, 21 yards
- DAL – CeeDee Lamb – 11 receptions, 151 yards, TD

==== Week 11: at Carolina Panthers ====
Week 11: Dallas Cowboys at Carolina Panthers – Game summary

Quarter	1	2	3	4	Total
**Cowboys**	7	10	0	16	**33**
Panthers	0	3	7	0	**10**

at Bank of America Stadium, Charlotte, North Carolina

- Date: November 19
- Game time: 1:00 p.m. EST/12:00 p.m. CST
- Game weather: Sunny, 65 °F (18 °C)
- Game attendance: 73,543
- Referee: Clay Martin
- TV announcers (Fox): Kevin Burkhardt, Greg Olsen, Erin Andrews and Tom Rinaldi
- Recap, Game Book

Game information

**First quarter**

- DAL – Luke Schoonmaker 18-yard pass from Dak Prescott (Brandon Aubrey kick), 3:20. Cowboys 7–0. **Drive: 10 plays, 83 yards, 4:59.**

**Second quarter**

- DAL – Brandon Aubrey 30-yard field goal, 11:01. Cowboys 10–0. **Drive: 12 plays, 69 yards, 5:09.**
- CAR – Eddy Piñeiro 42-yard field goal, 1:56. Cowboys 10–3. **Drive: 10 plays, 50 yards, 4:54.**
- DAL – CeeDee Lamb 5-yard pass from Dak Prescott (Brandon Aubrey kick), 0:24. Cowboys 17–3. **Drive: 11 plays, 60 yards, 1:32.**

**Third quarter**

- CAR – Tommy Tremble 4-yard pass from Bryce Young (Eddy Piñeiro kick), 1:59. Cowboys 17–10. **Drive: 17 plays, 70 yards, 8:58.**

**Fourth quarter**

- DAL – Tony Pollard 21-yard run (Brandon Aubrey kick), 13:58. Cowboys 24–10. **Drive: 8 plays, 75 yards, 3:01.**
- DAL – DaRon Bland 30-yard interception return (kick failed), 13:48. Cowboys 30–10.
- DAL – Brandon Aubrey 27-yard field goal, 7:18. Cowboys 33–10. **Drive: 7 plays, 18 yards, 4:00.**

**Top passers**

- DAL – Dak Prescott – 25/38, 189 yards, 2 TD
- CAR – Bryce Young – 16/29, 123 yards, TD, INT

**Top rushers**

- DAL – Tony Pollard – 12 rushes, 61 yards, TD
- CAR – Chuba Hubbard – 10 rushes, 57 yards

**Top receivers**

- DAL – CeeDee Lamb – 6 receptions, 38 yards, TD
- CAR – Adam Thielen – 8 receptions, 74 yards

==== Week 12: vs. Washington Commanders ====
Thanksgiving Day games

Week 12: Washington Commanders at Dallas Cowboys – Game summary

Quarter	1	2	3	4	Total
Commanders	0	10	0	0	**10**
**Cowboys**	7	13	0	25	**45**

at AT&T Stadium, Arlington, Texas

- Date: November 23
- Game time: 3:30 p.m. CST
- Game weather: None (retractable roof closed)
- Game attendance: 93,711
- Referee: Bill Vinovich
- TV announcers (CBS): Jim Nantz, Tony Romo and Tracy Wolfson
- Recap, Game Book

Game information

**First quarter**

- DAL – Rico Dowdle 15-yard pass from Dak Prescott (Brandon Aubrey kick), 0:46. Cowboys 7–0. **Drive: 11 plays, 90 yards, 5:07.**

**Second quarter**

- WAS – Joey Slye 43-yard field goal, 11:27. Cowboys 7–3. **Drive: 9 plays, 50 yards, 4:19.**
- DAL – Brandin Cooks 31-yard pass from Dak Prescott (Brandon Aubrey kick), 8:27. Cowboys 14–3. **Drive: 6 plays, 75 yards, 3:00.**
- WAS – Sam Howell 1-yard run (Joey Slye kick), 1:51. Cowboys 14–10. **Drive: 13 plays, 75 yards, 6:36.**
- DAL – Tony Pollard 7-yard run (kick failed), 0:26. Cowboys 20–10. **Drive: 5 plays, 75 yards, 1:25.**

**Third quarter**

- No scoring plays.

**Fourth quarter**

- DAL – Brandon Aubrey 52-yard field goal, 13:36. Cowboys 23–10. **Drive: 10 plays, 49 yards, 4:17.**
- DAL – CeeDee Lamb 15-yard pass from Dak Prescott (Dak Prescott-CeeDee Lamb pass), 10:32. Cowboys 31–10. **Drive: 3 plays, 24 yards, 1:24.**
- DAL – KaVontae Turpin 34-yard pass from Dak Prescott (Brandon Aubrey kick), 5:59. Cowboys 38–10. **Drive: 5 plays, 65 yards, 2:51.**
- DAL – DaRon Bland 63-yard interception return (Brandon Aubrey kick), 4:39. Cowboys 45–10.

**Top passers**

- WAS – Sam Howell – 28/44, 300 yards, INT
- DAL – Dak Prescott – 22/32, 331 yards, 4 TD

**Top rushers**

- WAS – Brian Robinson Jr. – 15 rushes, 53 yards
- DAL – Tony Pollard – 13 rushes, 79 yards, TD

**Top receivers**

- WAS – Curtis Samuel – 9 receptions, 100 yards
- DAL – Tony Pollard – 6 receptions, 24 yards

In a historical moment, DaRon Bland became the first NFL player to make his fifth pick six, which was the most in a single season. With the win, the Cowboys continued their win streak at home. The game averaged 41.438 million viewers, the third most viewed regular season NFL game ever.

==== Week 13: vs. Seattle Seahawks ====
Week 13: Seattle Seahawks at Dallas Cowboys – Game summary

Quarter	1	2	3	4	Total
Seahawks	7	14	7	7	**35**
**Cowboys**	10	10	7	14	**41**

at AT&T Stadium, Arlington, Texas

- Date: November 30
- Game time: 7:15 p.m. CST
- Game weather: None (retractable roof closed)
- Game attendance: 93,367
- Referee: Clete Blakeman
- TV announcers (KDFW/Prime Video): Al Michaels, Kirk Herbstreit and Kaylee Hartung
- Recap, Game Book

Game information

**First quarter**

- DAL – Brandon Aubrey 30-yard field goal, 9:10. Cowboys 3–0. **Drive: 14 plays, 63 yards, 5:50.**
- SEA – DK Metcalf 73-yard pass from Geno Smith (Jason Myers kick), 7:28. Seahawks 7–3. **Drive: 3 plays, 75 yards, 1:42.**
- DAL – CeeDee Lamb 15-yard pass from Dak Prescott (Brandon Aubrey kick), 4:48. Cowboys 10–7. **Drive: 5 plays, 75 yards, 2:40.**

**Second quarter**

- DAL – Brandin Cooks 7-yard pass from Dak Prescott (Brandon Aubrey kick), 11:37. Cowboys 17–7. **Drive: 11 plays, 68 yards, 4:21.**
- SEA – Zach Charbonnet 1-yard run (Jason Myers kick), 8:54. Cowboys 17–14. **Drive: 7 plays, 75 yards, 2:43.**
- DAL – Brandon Aubrey 31-yard field goal, 1:30. Cowboys 20–14. **Drive: 16 plays, 62 yards, 7:24.**
- SEA – DK Metcalf 1-yard pass from Geno Smith (Jason Myers kick), 0:04. Seahawks 21–20. **Drive: 8 plays, 75 yards, 1:26.**

**Third quarter**

- SEA – Geno Smith 5-yard run (Jason Myers kick), 10:01. Seahawks 28–20. **Drive: 10 plays, 75 yards, 4:59.**
- DAL – Tony Pollard 6-yard run (Brandon Aubrey kick), 3:41. Seahawks 28–27. **Drive: 12 plays, 75 yards, 6:20.**

**Fourth quarter**

- SEA – DK Metcalf 3-yard pass from Geno Smith (Jason Myers kick), 14:17. Seahawks 35–27. **Drive: 5 plays, 70 yards, 1:47.**
- DAL – Brandon Aubrey 38-yard field goal, 11:23. Seahawks 35–30. **Drive: 6 plays, 56 yards, 2:54.**
- DAL – Jake Ferguson 12-yard pass from Dak Prescott (Dak Prescott–Brandin Cooks pass), 4:37. Cowboys 38–35. **Drive: 7 plays, 54 yards, 2:27.**
- DAL – Brandon Aubrey 32-yard field goal, 1:43. Cowboys 41–35. **Drive: 6 plays, 35 yards, 1:28.**

**Top passers**

- SEA – Geno Smith – 23/41, 334 yards, 3 TD, INT
- DAL – Dak Prescott – 29/41, 299 yards, 3 TD

**Top rushers**

- SEA – Zach Charbonnet – 19 rushes, 60 yards, TD
- DAL – Tony Pollard – 20 rushes, 68 yards, TD

**Top receivers**

- SEA – Jaxon Smith-Njigba – 7 receptions, 62 yards
- DAL – CeeDee Lamb – 12 receptions, 116 yards, TD

==== Week 14: vs. Philadelphia Eagles ====
Week 14: Philadelphia Eagles at Dallas Cowboys – Game summary

Quarter	1	2	3	4	Total
Eagles	0	6	7	0	**13**
**Cowboys**	10	14	3	6	**33**

at AT&T Stadium, Arlington, Texas

- Date: December 10
- Game time: 7:20 p.m. CST
- Game weather: None (retractable roof closed)
- Game attendance: 93,752
- Referee: John Hussey
- TV announcers (NBC): Mike Tirico, Cris Collinsworth and Melissa Stark
- Recap, Game Book

Game information

**First quarter**

- DAL – CeeDee Lamb 13-yard pass from Dak Prescott (Brandon Aubrey kick), 10:00. Cowboys 7–0. **Drive: 10 plays, 75 yards, 5:00.**
- DAL – Brandon Aubrey 60-yard field goal, 0:50. Cowboys 10–0. **Drive: 13 plays, 37 yards, 4:52.**

**Second quarter**

- PHI – Jake Elliott 52-yard field goal, 12:34. Cowboys 10–3. **Drive: 8 plays, 41 yards, 3:16.**
- DAL – Rico Dowdle 1-yard run (Brandon Aubrey kick), 6:14. Cowboys 17–3. **Drive: 12 plays, 75 yards, 6:20.**
- PHI – Jake Elliott 44-yard field goal, 1:48. Cowboys 17–6. **Drive: 10 plays, 49 yards, 4:26.**
- DAL – Michael Gallup 1-yard pass from Dak Prescott (Brandon Aubrey kick), 0:20. Cowboys 24–6. **Drive: 8 plays, 75 yards, 1:28.**

**Third quarter**

- PHI – Jalen Carter 42-yard fumble return (Jake Elliott kick), 10:41. Cowboys 24–13.
- DAL – Brandon Aubrey 59-yard field goal, 4:49. Cowboys 27–13. **Drive: 9 plays, 34 yards, 5:52.**

**Fourth quarter**

- DAL – Brandon Aubrey 45-yard field goal, 9:40. Cowboys 30–13. **Drive: 11 plays, 44 yards, 5:45.**
- DAL – Brandon Aubrey 50-yard field goal, 1:08. Cowboys 33–13. **Drive: 9 plays, 56 yards, 5:30.**

**Top passers**

- PHI – Jalen Hurts – 18/27, 197 yards
- DAL – Dak Prescott – 24/39, 271 yards, 2 TD

**Top rushers**

- PHI – D'Andre Swift – 11 rushes, 39 yards
- DAL – Tony Pollard – 16 rushes, 59 yards

**Top receivers**

- PHI – A. J. Brown – 9 receptions, 94 yards
- DAL – Tony Pollard – 7 receptions, 37 yards

With the win, the Cowboys improved to 10–3, and overtook the Eagles for first place in the NFC East. The Cowboys had now won 15 consecutive home games, and became the first team in NFL history to score 30 or more points in their first 7 home games in a season. In addition, Brandon Aubrey became the first NFL kicker to make two field goals from 59+ yards in the same game.

==== Week 15: at Buffalo Bills ====
Week 15: Dallas Cowboys at Buffalo Bills – Game summary

Quarter	1	2	3	4	Total
Cowboys	0	3	0	7	**10**
**Bills**	7	14	3	7	**31**

at Highmark Stadium, Orchard Park, New York

- Date: December 17
- Game time: 4:25 p.m. EST/3:25 p.m. CST
- Game weather: Rain, 48 °F (9 °C)
- Game attendance: 70,933
- Referee: Craig Wrolstad
- TV announcers (Fox): Kevin Burkhardt, Greg Olsen, Erin Andrews and Tom Rinaldi
- Recap, Game Book

Game information

**First quarter**

- BUF – Latavius Murray 2-yard run (Tyler Bass kick), 8:06. Bills 7–0. **Drive: 12 plays, 75 yards, 6:54.**

**Second quarter**

- BUF – James Cook 18-yard pass from Josh Allen (Tyler Bass kick), 12:52. Bills 14–0. **Drive: 11 plays, 86 yards, 4:44.**
- DAL – Brandon Aubrey 32-yard field goal, 7:13. Bills 14–3. **Drive: 11 plays, 61 yards, 5:39.**
- BUF – Josh Allen 1-yard run (Tyler Bass kick), 1:36. Bills 21–3. **Drive: 11 plays, 76 yards, 5:37.**

**Third quarter**

- BUF – Tyler Bass 23-yard field goal, 2:36. Bills 24–3. **Drive: 15 plays, 65 yards, 8:22.**

**Fourth quarter**

- BUF – James Cook 24-yard run (Tyler Bass kick), 12:30. Bills 31–3. **Drive: 6 plays, 67 yards, 3:05.**
- DAL – CeeDee Lamb 3-yard run (Brandon Aubrey kick), 2:48. Bills 31–10. **Drive: 15 plays, 80 yards, 5:30.**

**Top passers**

- DAL – Dak Prescott – 21/34, 134 yards, INT
- BUF – Josh Allen – 7/15, 94 yards, TD

**Top rushers**

- DAL – Tony Pollard – 11 rushes, 52 yards
- BUF – James Cook – 25 rushes, 179 yards, TD

**Top receivers**

- DAL – CeeDee Lamb – 7 receptions, 53 yards
- BUF – Stefon Diggs – 4 receptions, 48 yards

The Green Bay Packers losing to the Tampa Bay Buccaneers, as well as the Atlanta Falcons losing to the Carolina Panthers allowed the Cowboys to clinch their third straight playoff berth before taking the field.

The Cowboys struggled all game, as they allowed Bills running back James Cook to dominate, and the Cowboys' offense was limited to just 195 total yards. It also marked the third consecutive time the Cowboys failed to defeat the Bills. Dallas has not won against Buffalo since 2011.

==== Week 16: at Miami Dolphins ====
Week 16: Dallas Cowboys at Miami Dolphins – Game summary

Quarter	1	2	3	4	Total
Cowboys	7	0	3	10	**20**
**Dolphins**	3	10	6	3	**22**

at Hard Rock Stadium, Miami Gardens, Florida

- Date: December 24
- Game time: 4:25 p.m. EST/3:25 p.m. CST
- Game weather: Cloudy, 75 °F (24 °C)
- Game attendance: 66,410
- Referee: Shawn Hochuli
- TV announcers (Fox): Kevin Burkhardt, Greg Olsen, Erin Andrews and Tom Rinaldi
- Recap, Game Book

Game information

**First quarter**

- MIA – Jason Sanders 57-yard field goal, 2:50. Dolphins 3–0. **Drive: 10 plays, 59 yards, 4:27.**
- DAL – CeeDee Lamb 49-yard pass from Dak Prescott (Brandon Aubrey kick), 1:30. Cowboys 7–3. **Drive: 3 plays, 75 yards, 1:20.**

**Second quarter**

- MIA – Jason Sanders 52-yard field goal, 4:31. Cowboys 7–6. **Drive: 6 plays, 31 yards, 2:50.**
- MIA – Raheem Mostert 4-yard pass from Tua Tagovailoa (Jason Sanders kick), 0:17. Dolphins 13–7. **Drive: 8 plays, 71 yards, 2:06.**

**Third quarter**

- MIA – Jason Sanders 54-yard field goal, 8:59. Dolphins 16–7. **Drive: 5 plays, 24 yards, 2:54.**
- DAL – Brandon Aubrey 43-yard field goal, 5:28. Dolphins 16–10. **Drive: 6 plays, 50 yards, 3:31.**
- MIA – Jason Sanders 35-yard field goal, 1:24. Dolphins 19–10. **Drive: 9 plays, 58 yards, 4:04.**

**Fourth quarter**

- DAL – Brandon Aubrey 33-yard field goal, 12:31. Dolphins 19–13. **Drive: 10 plays, 60 yards, 3:53.**
- DAL – Brandin Cooks 8-yard pass from Dak Prescott (Brandon Aubrey kick), 3:27. Cowboys 20–19. **Drive: 17 plays, 69 yards, 7:39.**
- MIA – Jason Sanders 29-yard field goal, 0:00. Dolphins 22–20. **Drive: 12 plays, 64 yards, 3:27.**

**Top passers**

- DAL – Dak Prescott – 20/32, 253 yards, 2 TD
- MIA – Tua Tagovailoa – 24/37, 293 yards, TD

**Top rushers**

- DAL – Tony Pollard – 12 rushes, 38 yards
- MIA – Raheem Mostert – 11 rushes, 46 yards

**Top receivers**

- DAL – CeeDee Lamb – 6 receptions, 118 yards, TD
- MIA – Tyreek Hill – 9 receptions, 99 yards

Despite a late rally, the Cowboys could not stop the Dolphins in the last seconds, as Miami scored on a game-winning field goal. This loss not only dropped the Cowboys to 10–5, but it was also the Cowboys' first loss to the Dolphins since 2003.

==== Week 17: vs. Detroit Lions ====
Week 17: Detroit Lions at Dallas Cowboys – Game summary

Quarter	1	2	3	4	Total
Lions	3	0	7	9	**19**
**Cowboys**	7	0	3	10	**20**

at AT&T Stadium, Arlington, Texas

- Date: December 30
- Game time: 7:15 p.m. CST
- Game weather: None (retractable roof closed)
- Game attendance: 93,731
- Referee: Brad Allen
- TV announcers (ESPN/ABC/ESPN2/ESPN+): Joe Buck, Troy Aikman and Lisa Salters
- Recap, Game Book

Game information

**First quarter**

- DET – Michael Badgley 41-yard field goal, 10:46. Lions 3–0. **Drive: 11 plays, 52 yards, 4:14.**
- DAL – CeeDee Lamb 92-yard pass from Dak Prescott (Brandon Aubrey kick), 3:26. Cowboys 7–3. **Drive: 3 plays, 89 yards, 1:02.**

**Second quarter**

- No scoring plays.

**Third quarter**

- DET – David Montgomery 3-yard run (Michael Badgley), 4:34. Lions 10–7. **Drive: 13 plays, 74 yards, 7:26.**
- DAL – Brandon Aubrey 51-yard field goal, 0:23. Tied 10–10. **Drive: 10 plays, 42 yards, 4:11.**

**Fourth quarter**

- DET – Michael Badgley 30-yard field goal, 12:18. Lions 13–10. **Drive: 7 plays, 63 yards, 3:05.**
- DAL – Brandin Cooks 8-yard pass from Dak Prescott (Brandon Aubrey kick), 7:20. Cowboys 17–13. **Drive: 9 plays, 75 yards, 4:58.**
- DAL – Brandon Aubrey 43-yard field goal, 1:41. Cowboys 20–13. **Drive: 4 plays, 4 yards, 0:24.**
- DET – Amon-Ra St. Brown 11-yard pass from Jared Goff (pass failed), 0:23. Cowboys 20–19. **Drive: 9 plays, 75 yards, 1:18.**

**Top passers**

- DET – Jared Goff – 19/34, 271 yards, TD, 2 INT
- DAL – Dak Prescott – 26/38, 345 yards, 2 TD, INT

**Top rushers**

- DET – David Montgomery – 14 rushes, 66 yards, TD
- DAL – Tony Pollard – 16 rushes, 49 yards

**Top receivers**

- DET – Amon-Ra St. Brown – 6 receptions, 90 yards, TD
- DAL – CeeDee Lamb – 13 receptions, 227 yards, TD

Following the win, the Cowboys went undefeated at home for the 2023 season and had their 16th consecutive home victory. This was the first time the Cowboys finished 8–0 at home since 1980 and 1981. This game was highly controversial because of an illegal touching penalty called on Taylor Decker. Brad Allen and his officiating crew were fired from the postseason because of the call.

==== Week 18: at Washington Commanders ====
Week 18: Dallas Cowboys at Washington Commanders – Game summary

Quarter	1	2	3	4	Total
**Cowboys**	7	14	14	3	**38**
Commanders	0	10	0	0	**10**

at FedExField, Landover, Maryland

- Date: January 7
- Game time: 4:25 p.m. EST/3:25 p.m. CST
- Game weather: Cloudy, 48 °F (9 °C)
- Game attendance: 63,645
- Referee: Shawn Smith
- TV announcers (Fox): Kevin Burkhardt, Greg Olsen, Erin Andrews and Tom Rinaldi
- Recap, Game Book

Game information

**First quarter**

- DAL – Jalen Tolbert 3-yard pass from Dak Prescott (Brandon Aubrey kick), 6:26. Cowboys 7–0. **Drive: 8 plays, 67 yards, 3:47.**

**Second quarter**

- WAS – Brian Robinson Jr. 1-yard pass from Sam Howell (Joey Slye kick), 14:57. Tied 7–7. **Drive: 7 plays, 20 yards, 3:24.**
- WAS – Joey Slye 36-yard field goal, 7:04. Commanders 10–7. **Drive: 9 plays, 38 yards, 4:26.**
- DAL – Tony Pollard 1-yard run (Brandon Aubrey kick), 4:12. Cowboys 14–10. **Drive: 7 plays, 71 yards, 2:52.**
- DAL – CeeDee Lamb 4-yard pass from Dak Prescott (Brandon Aubrey kick), 0:23. Cowboys 21–10. **Drive: 6 plays, 65 yards, 1:17.**

**Third quarter**

- DAL – CeeDee Lamb 6-yard pass from Dak Prescott (Brandon Aubrey kick), 8:28. Cowboys 28–10. **Drive: 12 plays, 75 yards, 6:32.**
- DAL – Jalen Brooks 5-yard pass from Dak Prescott (Brandon Aubrey kick), 4:06. Cowboys 35–10. **Drive: 3 plays, 9 yards, 1:54.**

**Fourth quarter**

- DAL – Brandon Aubrey 50-yard field goal, 1:06. Cowboys 38–10. **Drive: 8 plays, 36 yards, 4:05.**

**Top passers**

- DAL – Dak Prescott – 31/36, 279 yards, 4 TD, INT
- WAS – Sam Howell – 19/27, 153 yards, TD, 2 INT

**Top rushers**

- DAL – Tony Pollard – 17 rushes, 70 yards, TD
- WAS – Brian Robinson Jr. – 9 rushes, 25 yards

**Top receivers**

- DAL – CeeDee Lamb – 13 receptions, 98 yards, 2 TD
- WAS – Terry McLaurin – 6 receptions, 56 yards

After a rocky start, the Cowboys responded with 31 unanswered points, allowing them to rout the Commanders, clinch the NFC East for the second time in three years, and deny the Eagles a chance to repeat as NFC East champions for the first time since 2004.

=== Standings ===
==== Division ====
NFC East
	W	L	T	PCT	DIV	CONF	PF	PA	STK
^{(2)} Dallas Cowboys	12	5	0	.706	5–1	9–3	509	315	W2
^{(5)} Philadelphia Eagles	11	6	0	.647	4–2	7–5	433	428	L2
New York Giants	6	11	0	.353	3–3	5–7	266	407	W1
Washington Commanders	4	13	0	.235	0–6	2–10	329	518	L8

==== Conference ====
NFC
#	Team	Division	W	L	T	PCT	DIV	CONF	SOS	SOV	STK
**Division leaders**
1 (Note: San Francisco finished ahead of Dallas and Detroit based on conference record, claiming the No. 1 seed.)	San Francisco 49ers	West	12	5	0	.706	5–1	10–2	.509	.475	L1
2 (Note: Dallas claimed the No. 2 seed over Detroit based on head-to-head victory.)	Dallas Cowboys	East	12	5	0	.706	5–1	9–3	.446	.392	W2
3	Detroit Lions	North	12	5	0	.706	4–2	8–4	.481	.436	W1
4 (Note: Tampa Bay finished ahead of New Orleans in the NFC South based on common record. (Tampa Bay is 8–4 against Minnesota, Chicago, Detroit, Green Bay, Atlanta, Carolina, Houston, Tennessee, Jacksonville, and Indianapolis, while New Orleans is 6–6 against the same teams.))	Tampa Bay Buccaneers	South	9	8	0	.529	4–2	7–5	.481	.379	W1
**Wild cards**
5	Philadelphia Eagles	East	11	6	0	.647	4–2	7–5	.481	.476	L2
6	Los Angeles Rams	West	10	7	0	.588	5–1	8–4	.529	.453	W4
7 (Note: Green Bay and Seattle finished ahead of New Orleans based on conference record.) (Note: Green Bay finished ahead of Seattle based on strength of victory, claiming the 7th and final playoff spot.)	Green Bay Packers	North	9	8	0	.529	4–2	7–5	.474	.458	W3
**Did not qualify for the postseason**
8	Seattle Seahawks	West	9	8	0	.529	2–4	7–5	.512	.392	W1
9	New Orleans Saints	South	9	8	0	.529	4–2	6–6	.433	.340	W2
10 (Note: Minnesota finished ahead of Atlanta based on head-to-head victory. Division tie break was initially used to eliminate Chicago (see below).) (Note: Minnesota finished ahead of Chicago based on common record. (Minnesota is 5–7 against Tampa Bay, Los Angeles Chargers, Carolina, Kansas City, Green Bay, Atlanta, New Orleans, Denver, Las Vegas, and Detroit, while Chicago is 4–8 against the same teams.))	Minnesota Vikings	North	7	10	0	.412	2–4	6–6	.509	.454	L4
11 (Note: Chicago finished ahead of Atlanta based on head-to-head victory.)	Chicago Bears	North	7	10	0	.412	2–4	6–6	.464	.370	L1
12	Atlanta Falcons	South	7	10	0	.412	3–3	4–8	.429	.462	L2
13	New York Giants	East	6	11	0	.353	3–3	5–7	.512	.353	W1
14 (Note: Washington finished ahead of Arizona based on head-to-head victory.)	Washington Commanders	East	4	13	0	.235	0–6	2–10	.512	.338	L8
15	Arizona Cardinals	West	4	13	0	.235	0–6	3–9	.561	.588	L1
16	Carolina Panthers	South	2	15	0	.118	1–5	1–11	.522	.500	L3
**Tiebreakers** (Note: When breaking ties for three or more teams under the NFL's rules, they are first broken within divisions, then comparing only the highest-ranked remaining team from each division.)

== Postseason ==
=== Schedule ===
Round	Date	Opponent (seed)	Result	Record	Venue	Recap
Wild Card	January 14	Green Bay Packers (7)	L 32–48	0–1	AT&T Stadium	Recap

=== Game summaries ===
==== NFC Wild Card Playoffs: vs. (7) Green Bay Packers ====
NFC Wild Card Playoffs: (7) Green Bay Packers at (2) Dallas Cowboys – Game summary

Quarter	1	2	3	4	Total
Packers	7	20	14	7	48
Cowboys	0	7	9	16	32

at AT&T Stadium, Arlington, Texas

- Date: January 14, 2024
- Game time: 3:40 p.m. CST
- Game weather: None (retractable roof closed)
- Game attendance: 93,799
- Referee: Ronald Torbert
- TV announcers (Fox): Kevin Burkhardt, Greg Olsen, Erin Andrews and Tom Rinaldi
- Recap, Game Book

Game information

First quarter

- GB – Aaron Jones 3-yard run (Anders Carlson kick), 7:08. Packers 7–0. Drive: 12 plays, 75 yards, 7:52.

Second quarter

- GB – Aaron Jones 1-yard run (Anders Carlson kick), 14:15. Packers 14–0. Drive: 3 plays, 19 yards, 1:28.
- GB – Dontayvion Wicks 20-yard pass from Jordan Love (kick failed), 3:23. Packers 20–0. Drive: 10 plays, 93 yards, 5:44.
- GB – Darnell Savage 64-yard interception return (Anders Carlson kick), 1:50. Packers 27–0.
- DAL – Jake Ferguson 1-yard pass from Dak Prescott (Brandon Aubrey kick), 0:00. Packers 27–7. Drive: 12 plays, 55 yards, 1:50.

Third quarter

- DAL – Brandon Aubrey 34-yard field goal, 9:23. Packers 27–10. Drive: 12 plays, 60 yards, 5:37.
- GB – Aaron Jones 9-yard run (Anders Carlson kick), 6:38. Packers 34–10. Drive: 5 plays, 75 yards, 2:45.
- DAL – Tony Pollard 1-yard run (kick failed), 3:03. Packers 34–16. Drive: 5 plays, 75 yards, 2:45.
- GB – Luke Musgrave 38-yard pass from Jordan Love (Anders Carlson kick), 1:27. Packers 41–16. Drive: 3 plays, 75 yards, 1:36.

Fourth quarter

- GB – Romeo Doubs 3-yard pass from Jordan Love (Anders Carlson kick), 10:23. Packers 48–16. Drive: 8 plays, 40 yards, 4:37.
- DAL – Jake Ferguson 7-yard pass from Dak Prescott (Rico Dowdle run), 5:54. Packers 48–24. Drive: 11 plays, 75 yards, 4:29.
- DAL – Jake Ferguson 14-yard pass from Dak Prescott (Dak Prescott run), 3:25. Packers 48–32. Drive: 4 plays, 91 yards, 1:24.

Top passers

- GB – Jordan Love – 16/21, 272 yards, 3 TD
- DAL – Dak Prescott – 41/60, 403 yards, 3 TD, 2 INT

Top rushers

- GB – Aaron Jones – 21 rushes, 118 yards, 3 TD
- DAL – Tony Pollard – 15 rushes, 56 yards, TD

Top receivers

- GB – Romeo Doubs – 6 receptions, 151 yards, TD
- DAL – CeeDee Lamb – 9 receptions, 110 yards

This marks the sixth time in their past ten, that Dallas went one-and-done in the playoffs as well as their first home game loss since Week 1 of the previous season.
