= T. J. Bass (American football) =

American football player (born 1999)

No. 66 – Dallas Cowboys
- Position: Guard
- Roster status: Active

Personal information
- Born: March 31, 1999 (age 27); Deming, Washington, U.S.
- Listed height: 6 ft 4 in (1.93 m)
- Listed weight: 320 lb (145 kg)

Career information
- High school: Mount Baker (Deming)
- College: Butte (2018–2019); Oregon (2020–2022)
- NFL draft: 2023: undrafted

Career history
- Dallas Cowboys (2023–present)

Awards and highlights
- 2× First-team All-Pac-12 (2021, 2022)

Career NFL statistics as of Week 10, 2026
- Games played: 58
- Games started: 14
- Stats at Pro Football Reference

Travis Joesph Tyler "T. J." Bass (born March 31, 1999) is an American professional football offensive guard for the Dallas Cowboys of the National Football League (NFL). He played college football for the Butte Roadrunners before transferring to the Oregon Ducks and was signed by the Cowboys as an undrafted free agent after the 2023 NFL draft.

== Early life ==
Bass attended Mount Baker High School in Deming, Washington. He was a two-way player at tight end and defensive end. As a junior, he tallied 82 tackles (16.5 for loss), 10 sacks, 6 pass breakups, 13 receptions for 227 yards and 3 touchdowns. He also contributed to the team reaching the 1A state quarterfinals and running back Jed Schleimer setting a school record with 2,511 rushing yards and 36 touchdowns, including 521 rushing yards in a single-game. He received first-team All-Northwest Conference and Washington 1A All-state honors.

As a senior, he contributed to his team averaging 285.5 rushing yards per game and reaching the Class 1A state quarterfinals. He collected 23.5 tackles for loss, 13 sacks and 3 forced fumbles. He was named the Northwest Conference 1A co-MVP, but was ranked a zero-star recruit. He had no offers to play college football but enrolled at the University of Idaho following his time at Mount Baker.

He also competed in the shot put and discus throw.

== College career ==
Bass grayshirted at the University of Idaho before joining Butte College in January 2018. As a freshman, he was converted into an offensive guard. He contributed to the offense ranking 10th in the CCCAA in rushing yards per game (215.3). He received first-team All-California Region I and first-team CCCFCA All-America honors.

As a sophomore, he contributed to the team winning the Gridiron Classic Bowl title, while ranking ninth in the CCCAA in total offense (437.4) and rushing yards per game (183.8). He received first-team NorCal All-Conference and first-team CCCFCA All-American honors. He was ranked a four-star junior college recruit and was named the best junior college offensive guard nationally by 247Sports. Bass received many high-level Division I offers and eventually chose to play for the University of Oregon.

As a junior in 2020, he started all seven games at left guard, in a season that was reduced by the COVID-19 pandemic. He did not allow a sack and surrendered 6 quarterback pressures. He was named the Pac-12 Offensive Lineman of the Week for his play against Washington State University. He earned honorable-mention all-conference honors.

As a senior in 2021, he started all 14 games, the first six at left guard and the final eight at left tackle, after switching places with George Moore IV. He allowed 2 sacks and 14 quarterback pressures. He contributed to the offense ranking in the top 25 nationally in rushing yards per game (202.26) and tied for sixth in rushing touchdowns (36). He was named first-team All-Pac-12.

As a super senior in 2022, he started all 13 games at left tackle. He allowed one sack and 20 pressures on quarterback Bo Nix. He contributed to the offense finishing as the only unit in the nation in the top 20 for both passing offense (17th, 284.8 YPG) and rushing offense (12th, 215.77 YPG), while being part of an offensive line that led the nation with just five sacks allowed. He was the only player to be named Pac-12 Offensive Lineman of the Week multiple times during the season, receiving the honor in back-to-back games. He was named first-team All-Pac-12 and second-team All-American by The Athletic. He was invited to the NFLPA Collegiate Bowl after the season. He finished his college career having started all 34 games for the Ducks, 13 at left guard and 21 at left tackle.

== Professional career ==
Pre-draft measurables
Height	Weight	Arm length	Hand span	Wingspan	40-yard dash	10-yard split	20-yard split	Vertical jump	Broad jump
6 ft 4 3/8 in (1.94 m)	317 lb (144 kg)	32 3/8 in (0.82 m)	9 1/4 in (0.23 m)	6 ft 7 in (2.01 m)	5.48 s	1.86 s	3.05 s	28.5 in (0.72 m)	9 ft 1 in (2.77 m)
All values from NFL Combine

Bass was signed as an undrafted free agent by the Dallas Cowboys after the 2023 NFL draft on April 28, 2023. He impressed the team in preseason, being the only lineman on the team not to allow a quarterback pressure in their three games. On August 29, the Cowboys announced that he had made the initial 53-man roster. He was active for all 17 games and had two starts as an injury replacement. Bass started at right guard in place of an injured Zack Martin in the third game against the Arizona Cardinals. He started at left guard in place of an injured Tyler Smith in the season finale against the Washington Commanders, with the NFC East division title on the line.

In 2024, Bass appeared in 15 games, starting two at left guard and one at right guard. In Week 5 against the Pittsburgh Steelers, he took over at left guard in the second quarter, replacing an injured Tyler Smith. In Week 6 against the Detroit Lions, he started at left guard in place of the injured Smith. In Week 12 against the Washington Commanders, he started at left guard in place of an injured Smith. In Week 14 against the Cincinnati Bengals, he took over the right guard position in the third quarter, when Brock Hoffman moved over to center due to Cooper Beebe suffering a concussion. In Week 15 against the Carolina Panthers, he remained the starter at right guard, while Beebe recovered from his injury. He was declared inactive in Weeks 16 and 17.

In 2025, Bass appeared in 16 games, starting three at right guard and two at left guard. On January 3, 2026, Bass was placed on season-ending injured reserve due to a knee injury.

Designated as a restricted free agent in the 2026 offseason, the Cowboys placed a second-round tender on Bass on March 7, 2026. Bass signed his tender on March 17.
