= Brock Hoffman =

American football player (born 1999)

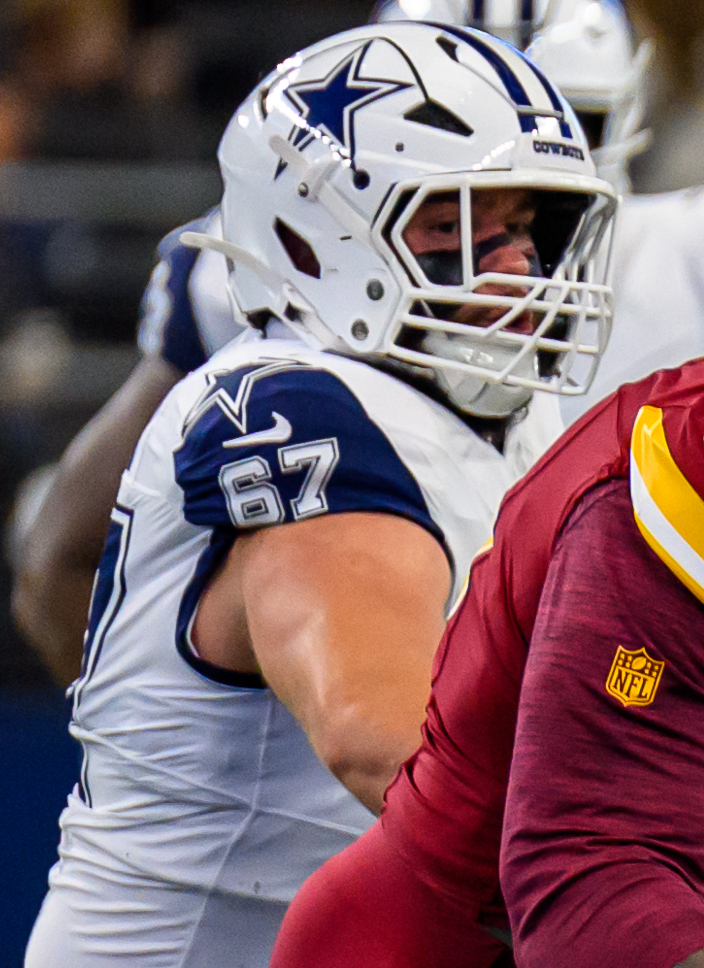
- Hoffman in 2025

No. 67 – Pittsburgh Steelers
- Position: Guard
- Roster status: Active

Personal information
- Born: July 2, 1999 (age 27); Statesville, North Carolina, U.S.
- Listed height: 6 ft 4 in (1.93 m)
- Listed weight: 318 lb (144 kg)

Career information
- High school: Statesville
- College: Coastal Carolina (2017–2018); Virginia Tech (2019–2021)
- NFL draft: 2022: undrafted

Career history
- Cleveland Browns (2022)*; Dallas Cowboys (2022–2025); Pittsburgh Steelers (2026–present)
- * Offseason or practice squad member only

Career NFL statistics as of Week 7, 2026
- Games played: 61
- Games started: 21
- Stats at Pro Football Reference

Brock Hoffman (born July 2, 1999) is an American professional football guard for the Pittsburgh Steelers of the National Football League (NFL). He played college football for the Coastal Carolina Chanticleers and Virginia Tech Hokies.

== Early life ==
Hoffman attended West Iredell High School. He transferred to Statesville High School after his freshman season. As a junior, he was named the starter at center and was an All-North Piedmont Conference selection.

As a senior, he received first-team NCPreps.com 3A All-state, second-team American Family Insurance All-North Carolina (all divisions), and All-North Piedmont Conference honors.

== College career ==
Hoffman committed to Georgia Southern University for 6 months, before accepting a football scholarship from Coastal Carolina University.

As a freshman, he started all 12 games at center, becoming the first true freshman to start at center and just the third true freshman to start along the offensive line in school history. He received Sun Belt Conference Commissioner's List recognition for having at least a 3.5 GPA for the 2017-18 academic year.

As a sophomore, he started all 12 games at right guard and did not allow a sack. He contributed to the offense ranking fourth in the Sun Belt Conference with an average of 198.7 rushing yards per game. He received CoSIDA Academic All-District first-team honors and Commissioner's List recognition for having at least a 3.5 GPA for the 2018-19 academic year.

In 2019, he transferred to Virginia Tech to be closer to his mother, who was having health issues after going through surgery to remove a non-cancerous brain tumor two years before. He was unable to participate in football after his appeal to the NCAA for immediate eligibility through the family hardship waiver was denied, even though his case became national news.

As a junior, he started all 11 games at center. He contributed to the offense leading the ACC Conference with an average of 240.1 yards per game. He was selected as ACC Offensive Lineman of the Week twice after games against the University of Louisville and North Carolina State University. He received All-ACC Academic Team honors.

As a senior, he had 10 starts at center and one at left guard. He moved to right tackle against West Virginia University when starter Silas Dzansi left the game with an injury. He started at center against Boston College before leaving the game with an injury. He was a reserve against the University of Miami.

== Professional career ==
Pre-draft measurables
Height	Weight	Arm length	Hand span	Wingspan	40-yard dash	10-yard split	20-yard split	20-yard shuttle	Three-cone drill	Vertical jump	Broad jump	Bench press
6 ft 3 1/2 in (1.92 m)	302 lb (137 kg)	33 1/4 in (0.84 m)	10 5/8 in (0.27 m)	6 ft 9 1/8 in (2.06 m)	5.48 s	1.78 s	3.08 s	4.62 s	7.75 s	28.0 in (0.71 m)	8 ft 7 in (2.62 m)	20 reps
All values from Pro Day

=== Cleveland Browns ===
Hoffman was signed as an undrafted free agent by the Cleveland Browns after the 2022 NFL draft on April 30. He was waived by the Browns on August 30, but was re–signed to the team's practice squad the following day. He was released from the practice squad on November 7, 2022.

=== Dallas Cowboys ===
On November 16, 2022, Hoffman was signed to the Dallas Cowboys practice squad. On December 29, he was elevated to the active roster from the practice squad. On January 21, 2023, he was elevated to the active roster from the practice squad, for the NFC Divisional Playoff game against the San Francisco 49ers.

On January 23, 2023, he signed a reserve/future contract with the Cowboys. He was waived on August 29, and re-signed to the practice squad. He was elevated to the active roster during the first 3 weeks of the season. He started at center in place of Tyler Biadasz in the third game against the Arizona Cardinals. He was signed to the active roster on September 30. He started at right guard in place of Zack Martin in the season finale against the Washington Commanders, with the NFC East division title on the line.

In 2024, he took over at right guard for an injured Zack Martin, in the fourth quarter in Week 10 against the Houston Texans. He contributed to solidify the team's offensive line play, after replacing the future Hall of Famer Martin in the starting lineup for the rest of the season, who had to undergo right ankle surgery and eventually decided to retire. In Week 14 against the Cincinnati Bengals, he took over the center position in the third quarter, after Cooper Beebe was ruled out with a concussion. In Week 15 against the Carolina Panthers, he remained the starter at center, while Beebe recovered from his injury. He returned to the starting right guard position for the remaining 3 games. He started the last 7 contests and contributed to Rico Dowdle becoming the first undrafted free agent in team history to rush for 1,000 rushing yards in a single-season.

In 2025, he started six straight games at center in place of an injured Beebe, from Week 3 to Week 8. In the season finale against the New York Giants, he started at left guard after the Cowboys moved Tyler Smith to left tackle and T.J. Bass was placed on injured reserve with a knee injury. He appeared in 17 games with 7 starts.

=== Pittsburgh Steelers ===
On March 21, 2026, Hoffman signed with the Pittsburgh Steelers on a one-year contract. He reunited with head coach Mike McCarthy.
