= Cooper Beebe =

American football player (born 2001)

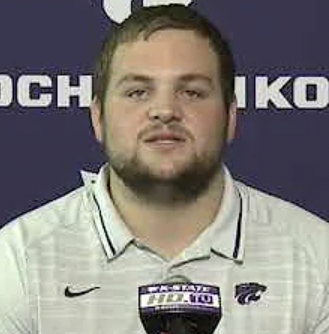
- Beebe with Kansas State in 2020

No. 56 – Dallas Cowboys
- Position: Center
- Roster status: Active

Personal information
- Born: May 19, 2001 (age 25); Kansas City, Kansas, U.S.
- Listed height: 6 ft 3 in (1.91 m)
- Listed weight: 320 lb (145 kg)

Career information
- High school: Piper (Kansas City)
- College: Kansas State (2019–2023)
- NFL draft: 2024: 3rd round, 73rd overall pick

Career history
- Dallas Cowboys (2024–present)

Awards and highlights
- Unanimous All-American (2023); First-team All-American (2022); 2× Big 12 Offensive Lineman of the Year (2022, 2023); 3× first-team All-Big 12 (2021–2023)

Career NFL statistics as of Week 4, 2026
- Games played: 31
- Games started: 31
- Stats at Pro Football Reference

Cooper Beebe (born May 19, 2001) is an American professional football center for the Dallas Cowboys of the National Football League (NFL). He played college football for the Kansas State Wildcats, being named a unanimous All-American in 2023, and was selected by the Cowboys in the third round of the 2024 NFL draft.

== Early life ==
Beebe was born on May 19, 2001, in Kansas City, Kansas. He attended Piper High School before committing to play college football at Kansas State.

== College career ==
Beebe played in two games during his true freshman season at Kansas State while redshirting the season. He started eight games during his redshirt freshman season. Beebe started all 13 of the Wildcats' games in 2021 and was named first team All-Big 12 Conference. In 2023, Beebe was named as one of three finalist for the Outland Trophy which is awarded to the nation's best OL/interior DL.

== Professional career ==
Pre-draft measurables
Height	Weight	Arm length	Hand span	Wingspan	40-yard dash	10-yard split	20-yard split	20-yard shuttle	Three-cone drill	Vertical jump	Broad jump	Bench press
6 ft 3 1/4 in (1.91 m)	322 lb (146 kg)	31 1/2 in (0.80 m)	9 1/4 in (0.23 m)	6 ft 6 1/8 in (1.98 m)	5.03 s	1.75 s	2.93 s	4.61 s	7.44 s	27.5 in (0.70 m)	9 ft 1 in (2.77 m)	20 reps
All values from NFL Combine

Beebe was selected in the third round with the 73rd overall pick by the Dallas Cowboys in the 2024 NFL draft. He was drafted to replace Tyler Biadasz who left in free agency. During the offseason, he was switched from his college guard position to center. He began OTAs as the backup behind third-year player Brock Hoffman, before passing him on the depth chart. He started at center in all 16 games he played and missed one with an injury. In Week 14 against the Cincinnati Bengals, he was ruled out at halftime with a concussion and was replaced with Hoffman. He missed the Week 15 game against the Carolina Panthers while recovering from the concussion. He contributed to Rico Dowdle becoming the first undrafted free agent in team history to rush for 1,000 rushing yards in a single-season.

Beebe began the 2025 season as Dallas' starting center. In Week 2 against the New York Giants, Beebe suffered an ankle injury, causing him to be placed on injured reserve on September 15, 2025. He was activated on November 3, ahead of the team's Week 9 matchup against the Arizona Cardinals.
