= Jalen Brooks =

American football player (born 2000)

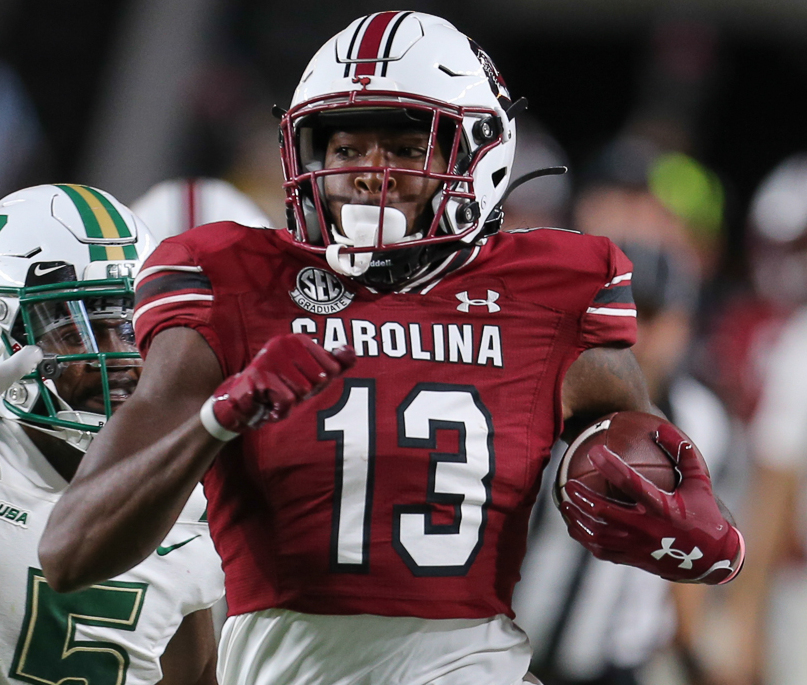
- Brooks with the South Carolina Gamecocks in 2022

No. 86 – Arizona Cardinals
- Position: Wide receiver
- Roster status: Injured reserve

Personal information
- Born: May 7, 2000 (age 26); Harrisburg, North Carolina, U.S.
- Listed height: 6 ft 2 in (1.88 m)
- Listed weight: 205 lb (93 kg)

Career information
- High school: Hickory Ridge (Harrisburg)
- College: Wingate (2018–2019); Tarleton State (2020); South Carolina (2020–2022)
- NFL draft: 2023: 7th round, 244th overall pick

Career history
- Dallas Cowboys (2023–2025); Arizona Cardinals (2025–present)

Awards and highlights
- All-South Atlantic Conference (2019)

Career NFL statistics as of Week 5, 2026
- Receptions: 23
- Receiving yards: 308
- Receiving touchdowns: 1
- Stats at Pro Football Reference

Jalen Allen Brooks (born May 7, 2000) is an American professional football wide receiver for the Arizona Cardinals of the National Football League (NFL). He played college football for the South Carolina Gamecocks.

== Early life and college ==
Brooks was born on May 7, 2000, and grew up in Harrisburg, North Carolina. He attended Northwestern High School before transferring to Hickory Ridge High School, where he recorded 44 receptions for 771 yards with nine touchdowns as a senior. He committed to play college football at Division II Wingate. He also ran track at Wingate.

As a true freshman at Wingate in 2018, Brooks played 12 games and posted 17 receptions for 297 yards and four touchdowns. The following year, he started 11 of his 12 appearances, and tallied 751 receiving yards off 35 catches with six scores. He had 100-yard games against Virginia–Wise, Newberry and UNC Pembroke, while contributing to Wingate's 10–2 record and playoff berth. Brooks was named first-team All-South Atlantic Conference for his performance.

Brooks initially transferred to Tarleton State in 2020, but before the season started transferred again to South Carolina. He was denied eligibility until the fifth game of the season, and ended up playing six contests, four as a starter, while making 11 receptions for 100 yards. In 2021, Brooks started the first six games and recorded 14 catches for 181 yards with one score, before leaving the team for personal reasons.

Brooks returned to South Carolina prior to the 2022 season. He started all 12 games and registered 33 catches for 504 yards (both placing second on the team) with one touchdown, additionally posting four rushes for 51 yards and another score. He missed the Gator Bowl for an off-field issue and afterwards declared for the NFL draft.

== Professional career ==
Pre-draft measurables
Height	Weight	Arm length	Hand span	Wingspan	40-yard dash	10-yard split	20-yard split	20-yard shuttle	Three-cone drill	Vertical jump	Broad jump	Bench press
6 ft 1 in (1.85 m)	201 lb (91 kg)	34 1/8 in (0.87 m)	9 1/2 in (0.24 m)	6 ft 8 1/4 in (2.04 m)	4.58 s	1.63 s	2.68 s	4.31 s	7.15 s	35.0 in (0.89 m)	10 ft 10 in (3.30 m)	15 reps
All values from NFL Combine/Pro Day

=== Dallas Cowboys ===
Brooks was selected by the Dallas Cowboys in the seventh round (244th overall) of the 2023 NFL draft. As a rookie, he appeared in seven games and had six receptions for 64 yards. He was declared inactive in 11 contests.

In 2024, he appeared in 14 games (one start), registering 12 receptions for 177 yards, 4 special teams tackles and one touchdown, which came against the Carolina Panthers (Week 15). In Week 9, he made his first career start against the Atlanta Falcons, collecting 2 receptions for 26 yards. In Week 14, he caught a career-long 41-yard pass against the Washington Commanders. He was declared inactive in 3 contests.

In 2025, he was pushed farther down the depth chart during preseason. He was waived as part of final roster cuts and re-signed to the practice squad the next day On August 27, 2025. In Week 5, he was elevated to play against the New York Jets, but suffered a knee injury. He was released on October 25 with an injury settlement.

=== Arizona Cardinals ===
On October 30, 2025, Brooks signed with the Arizona Cardinals' practice squad. He was elevated three times. He was promoted to the active roster on December 16, to provide depth because of injuries to other wide receivers. He appeared in 6 games, making 3 receptions for 51 yards and 10 kickoff returns for 254 yards.

On October 25, 2026, in the Week 7 matchup against the Denver Broncos, Brooks dislocated his wrist and was placed on season-ending injured reserve.

=== Statistics ===
==== Regular season ====
Year	Team	Games		Receiving					Fumbles	
Year	Team	GP	GS	Rec	Yds	Avg	Lng	TD	Fum	Lost
2023	DAL	6	0	6	64	10.7	24	0	0	0
2024	DAL	14	1	12	177	14.8	41	1	0	0
2025	ARI	6	0	3	51	17	20	0	0	0
2026	ARI	5	0	2	16	8.0	9	0	0	0
Career		31	1	23	308	13.4	41	1	0	0
