= Chuma Edoga =

American football player (born 1997)

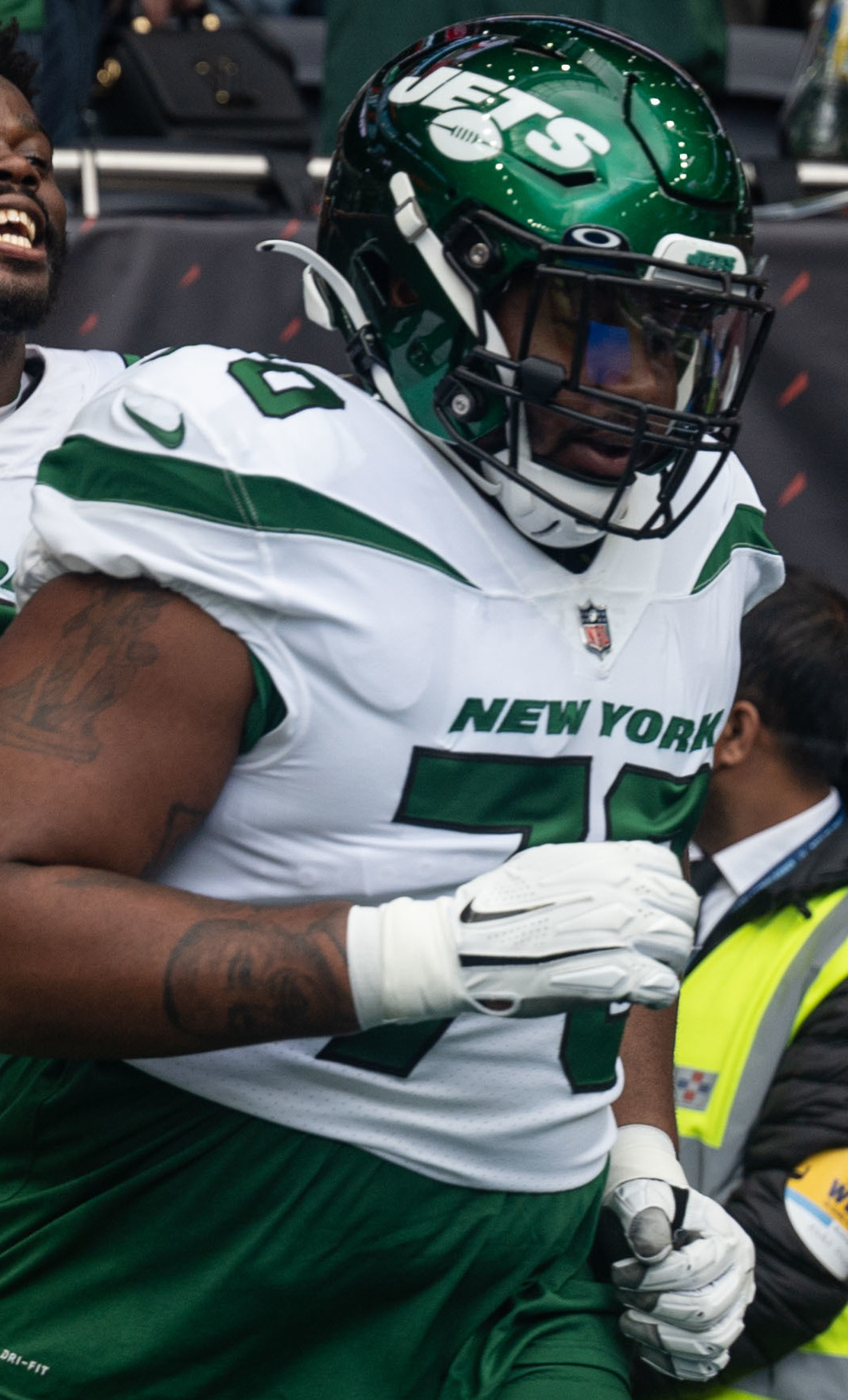
- Edoga with the New York Jets in 2021

No. 62 – Baltimore Ravens
- Position: Guard
- Roster status: Active

Personal information
- Born: May 25, 1997 (age 29); Powder Springs, Georgia, U.S.
- Listed height: 6 ft 3 in (1.91 m)
- Listed weight: 308 lb (140 kg)

Career information
- High school: McEachern (Powder Springs)
- College: USC (2015–2018)
- NFL draft: 2019: 3rd round, 92nd overall pick

Career history
- New York Jets (2019–2021); Atlanta Falcons (2022); Dallas Cowboys (2023–2024); Jacksonville Jaguars (2025)*; Baltimore Ravens (2026–present)
- * Offseason or practice squad member only

Awards and highlights
- Second-team All-Pac-12 (2018)

Career NFL statistics as of 2025
- Games played: 62
- Games started: 25
- Stats at Pro Football Reference

Chuma Edoga (born May 25, 1997) is an American professional football offensive guard for the Baltimore Ravens of the National Football League (NFL). He played college football for the USC Trojans and was selected by the New York Jets in the third round of the 2019 NFL draft.

== Early life ==
Edoga attended McEachern High School. He was a starter at left tackle. As a junior, he received All-State Class 6A and Student Sports Junior All-American honors.

As a senior, he received All-State Class 6A, USA Today All-Georgia, Parade All-American, Prep Star All-American Dream Team and Max Preps All-American honors.

== College career ==
Edoga accepted a football scholarship from the University of Southern California. As a true freshman, he appeared in 13 contests with 2 starts at right tackle. He didn't play against Stanford University and in the Pac-12 Championship Game. He had wrist surgery after the season.

As a sophomore, he appeared in 9 games and started in the last 2 contests of the season at left tackle. He didn't play against Stanford University, the University of Utah and the University of California.

As a junior, he started 12 games at right tackle. He didn't play against Oregon State University and the University of Utah.

As a senior, he started 10 games at right tackle. He missed 2 contests due to injury, against the University of California and UCLA.

== Professional career ==
Pre-draft measurables
Height	Weight	Arm length	Hand span	Wingspan	40-yard dash	10-yard split	20-yard shuttle	Three-cone drill	Vertical jump	Broad jump	Bench press
6 ft 3 1/2 in (1.92 m)	308 lb (140 kg)	34 3/4 in (0.88 m)	9 5/8 in (0.24 m)	6 ft 9 1/2 in (2.07 m)	5.19 s	1.78 s	4.53 s	7.47 s	24.5 in (0.62 m)	9 ft 0 in (2.74 m)	21 reps
All values from NFL Combine/Pro Day

=== New York Jets ===
Edoga was selected by the New York Jets in the third round (92nd overall) of the 2019 NFL draft. He started eight games, that included five at right tackle and three at left tackle. Edoga suffered a knee injury in Week 12 against the Oakland Raiders. He was placed on injured reserve on December 17, 2019.

In 2020, Edoga was passed on the depth chart by George Fant. He appeared in 11 games for the Jets (including four starts). Edoga started two games at right tackle and the other two at left tackle.

In 2021, Edoga entered the season as a backup and lost the starting right tackle competition to Morgan Moses. He dressed but did not play in four of the first five games of the season. On November 13, Edoga was placed on injured reserve. He was activated on December 18. He returned to play in the last 2 games of the season.

In 2022, Edoga was passed on the depth chart by rookie Max Mitchell. On August 30, 2022, he was waived by the Jets as a part of final roster cuts.

=== Atlanta Falcons ===
On August 31, 2022, Edoga was claimed off waivers by the Atlanta Falcons. He was moved to offensive guard. He was declared inactive for 11 games and played in 2 contests with one start at left guard. He suffered a knee injury that kept him out of 4 straight games. On December 31, he was placed on injured reserve list.

=== Dallas Cowboys ===
On March 21, 2023, Edoga signed with the Dallas Cowboys as a potential replacement for Connor McGovern who left in free agency. He hyperextended his right knee causing a bone bruise during training camp and did not play in any of the preseason games. On August 29, he was released in a planned transaction. On August 30, he was re-signed after the Cowboys made additional roster moves. He appeared in all 17 regular-season games, starting six contests at left tackle in place of an injured Tyron Smith, and 2 contests at left guard in place of an injured Tyler Smith. He was the team's reserve swing offensive tackle for most of the season. He struggled in Week 16 against the Miami Dolphins, while playing against defensive end Bradley Chubb.

On April 3, 2024, Edoga re-signed with the Cowboys on a one-year contract. Although he was named the starter at left tackle after Tyron Smith left in free agency, he was replaced by first round draft choice Tyler Guyton, after fracturing his toe in the first preseason game against the Los Angeles Rams. He was placed on injured reserve on August 29. He was activated on November 23. He appeared in five games, with four starts at left tackle. He took over Guyton as the starter at left tackle from Week 14 to Week 17. He was declared inactive in Week 18.

=== Jacksonville Jaguars ===
On March 12, 2025, Edoga signed with the Jacksonville Jaguars on a two-year, $7 million contract. He appeared in 14 games and made two starts. He provided flexibility off the bench, with his ability to play both the guard and tackle positions.

On August 30, 2026, Edoga was released by the Jaguars as a part of final roster cuts.

=== Baltimore Ravens ===
On September 3, 2026, Edoga was signed to the Baltimore Ravens' practice squad. On November 16, he was signed to the active roster.

== Personal life ==
Edoga is of Nigerian descent.
