= John Stephens Jr. =

American football player (born 1999)

Profile
- Position: Tight end

Personal information
- Born: September 23, 1999 (age 27); Logansport, Louisiana, U.S.
- Listed height: 6 ft 5 in (1.96 m)
- Listed weight: 240 lb (109 kg)

Career information
- High school: Logansport (Logansport, Louisiana)
- College: TCU (2018–2020); Louisiana (2021–2022)
- NFL draft: 2023: undrafted

Career history
- Dallas Cowboys (2023–2025)
- Stats at Pro Football Reference

John Stephens Jr. (born September 23, 1999) is an American professional football tight end. He played college football for the TCU Horned Frogs and the Louisiana Ragin' Cajuns and was signed by the Cowboys as an undrafted free agent after the 2023 NFL draft.

== Early life ==
Stephens attended Logansport High School, which had a total enrollment of just 175 students. He was a two-way player at wide receiver and defensive lineman.

As a senior, he registered 1,001 receiving yards, 17 touchdowns and 64 solo tackles (12 for loss). He contributed to his 1A program having a 13-1 record and reaching the state semifinals.

== College career ==
=== TCU ===
Stephens accepted a football scholarship from Texas Christian University. As a true freshman, he played in eight games off the bench, making 2 receptions for 58 yards (29-yard avg.). He had a 47-yard reception against the University of Oklahoma.

As a sophomore, he appeared in 12 games, tallying 11 receptions for 157 yards (14.3-yard avg.). He had 3 receptions for 40 yards against Texas Tech University.

As a junior, he appeared in 5 games, making only one reception for 5 yards (against Kansas State University).

=== UL Lafayette ===
Stephens transferred after his junior season to the University of Louisiana at Lafayette. As a senior in 2021, he collected 13 receptions for 167 yards and 4 touchdowns. He had 3 receptions for 48 yards and one touchdown against Nicholls State University. He made 3 receptions for 37 yards and 2 touchdowns against Ohio University.

As a super senior in 2022, he was a backup wide receiver, compiling 14 receptions for 284 yards and 3 touchdowns. He had 3 receptions for 103 yards and one touchdown against Eastern Michigan University. He made 3 receptions for 47 yards against the University of Houston.

== Professional career ==
Pre-draft measurables
Height	Weight	Arm length	Hand span	40-yard dash	10-yard split	20-yard split	20-yard shuttle	Three-cone drill	Vertical jump	Broad jump	Bench press
6 ft 5 1/2 in (1.97 m)	232 lb (105 kg)	33 1/2 in (0.85 m)	10 1/8 in (0.26 m)	4.67 s	1.55 s	2.65 s	4.37 s	7.19 s	36 in (0.91 m)	10 ft 3 in (3.12 m)	20 reps
All values from Pro Day

Stephens was signed as an undrafted free agent by the Dallas Cowboys after the 2023 NFL draft on May 12. He was converted into a tight end during training camp. He was trending toward making the roster, before suffering an ACL injury in the second preseason game against the Seattle Seahawks. He was placed on the injured reserve list on August 29, 2023.

On October 24, 2024, it was announced that Stephens had suffered another torn ACL in practice, and would miss the remainder of the season.

Stephens was waived by the Cowboys on August 25, 2025 and reverted to injured reserved. He was released on November 18 with an injury settlement.

== Personal life ==
Stephens is the son of former NFL running back, John Stephens. His half-sister is 2017 U.S. Open tennis champion Sloane Stephens.
