= Tyrus Wheat =

American football player (born 1999)

Tyrus Wheat Sr.
No. 90 – Detroit Lions
- Position: Outside linebacker
- Roster status: Active

Personal information
- Born: December 8, 1999 (age 26); Amite, Louisiana, U.S.
- Listed height: 6 ft 2 in (1.88 m)
- Listed weight: 260 lb (118 kg)

Career information
- High school: Amite
- College: Copiah–Lincoln CC (2018–2019); Mississippi State (2020–2022)
- NFL draft: 2023: undrafted

Career history
- Dallas Cowboys (2023–2024); Detroit Lions (2025); Dallas Cowboys (2026); Detroit Lions (2026–present)

Awards and highlights
- Second-team All-SEC (2022)

Career NFL statistics as of Week 3, 2026
- Total tackles: 34
- Sacks: 2.0
- Forced fumbles: 1
- Pass deflections: 1
- Stats at Pro Football Reference

Tyrus Darrell Wheat Sr. (born December 8, 1999) is an American professional football outside linebacker for the Detroit Lions of the National Football League (NFL). He played college football for the Mississippi State Bulldogs and was signed by the Dallas Cowboys as an undrafted free agent following the 2023 NFL Draft.

== Early life ==
Wheat grew up in Amite, Louisiana and attended Amite High School with a fellow native and Philadelphia Eagles Devonta Smith. He was rated a three-star recruit and initially committed to play college football at Missouri. Wheat failed to qualify academically to play Division I football and enrolled at Copiah–Lincoln Community College During his tenure at Copiah–Lincoln, Wheat made 104 tackles, notched five interceptions, forced two fumbles, and recovered three fumbles over two seasons. His performance earned him the opportunity to transfer to Mississippi State University in 2020 .

At Mississippi State, Wheat immediately impacted the Bulldogs’ defense. In his first season, he started eight out of nine games, leading the team with five sacks. As a senior, he tallied 46 tackles, 10.5 tackles-for-loss, and led the team again with 7.5 sacks. Utilizing the NCAA’s COVID-19 eligibility extension, Wheat returned for a third season at MSU and led the team with six sacks for the third consecutive year.

Wheat’s play earned him second-team All-SEC honors in 2022. Following his collegiate career, he entered the 2023 NFL Draft and went undrafted, signing with the Dallas Cowboys afterward.

== College career ==
Wheat began his college career at Copiah–Lincoln Community College (Co–Lin). He played two seasons at Co–Lin and recorded 104 tackles, five interceptions, two forced fumbles, and three fumble recoveries. Wheat committed to transfer to Mississippi State for his remaining collegiate eligibility.

Wheat played in nine games with eight starts in his first season at Mississippi State and led the Bulldogs with five sacks. He had 46 tackles, 10.5 tackles for loss, and again led the team with 7.5 sacks as a senior. Wheat used the extra year of eligibility granted to college athletes due to the COVID-19 pandemic and returned to Mississippi State for a third season. He had six sacks, which were a team-high for the third straight year, in his final season.

== Professional career ==
Pre-draft measurables
Height	Weight	Arm length	Hand span	Wingspan	40-yard dash	10-yard split	20-yard split	20-yard shuttle	Vertical jump	Broad jump	Bench press
6 ft 2 in (1.88 m)	263 lb (119 kg)	32 7/8 in (0.84 m)	9 in (0.23 m)	6 ft 6 1/2 in (1.99 m)	4.65 s	1.59 s	2.71 s	4.54 s	28.5 in (0.72 m)	9 ft 5 in (2.87 m)	20 reps
All values from NFL Combine/Pro Day

=== Dallas Cowboys (first stint) ===
Wheat signed with the Dallas Cowboys as an undrafted free agent on May 12, 2023. He was waived on August 29, 2023 and re-signed to the practice squad. Wheat was promoted to the active roster on October 16.

On August 26, 2025, Wheat was waived by the Cowboys as part of final roster cuts.

=== Detroit Lions (first stint) ===
On August 27, 2025, Wheat was claimed off waivers by the Detroit Lions.

=== Dallas Cowboys (second stint) ===
On March 13, 2026, Wheat signed with the Dallas Cowboys. He was released on November 14.

=== Detroit Lions (second stint) ===
On November 16, 2026, Wheat was claimed off waivers by the Detroit Lions.
