= David Durden =

American football player (born 1998)

Profile
- Position: Wide receiver

Personal information
- Born: December 26, 1998 (age 27); Twin City, Georgia, U.S.
- Listed height: 6 ft 2 in (1.88 m)
- Listed weight: 200 lb (91 kg)

Career information
- High school: Emanuel County Institute (Twin City, Georgia)
- College: Mercer (2018–2019); West Florida (2020–2022)
- NFL draft: 2023: undrafted

Career history
- Dallas Cowboys (2023); Arlington Renegades (2024–2025); BC Lions (2025)*
- * Offseason or practice squad member only

Awards and highlights
- 2× First-team All-GSC (2021, 2022); First-team All-SoCon (2019)
- Stats at Pro Football Reference

John David Durden II (born December 26, 1998) is an American professional football wide receiver who is currently a free agent. He played college football at Mercer before transferring to West Florida. He also played minor league baseball in the Boston Red Sox organization.

== Early life and baseball career ==
Durden grew up in Midville, Georgia and attended the Emanuel County Institute. He committed to play college football at Mercer.

Durden was selected in the 20th round of the 2017 Major League Baseball draft by the Boston Red Sox. He signed with the team and received a $125,000 bonus to forgo his commitment to Mercer. Durden was assigned to the Rookie-level Gulf Coast League Red Sox and batted .220 in 91 at-bats. After the season, he retired from baseball in order to pursue playing college football.

== College career ==
Durden enrolled at Mercer prior to the beginning of the 2018 season. He caught 18 passes for 407 yards with five touchdowns as a freshman. Durden had 45 receptions for 647 yards and four touchdowns and returned 29 kickoffs for 750 yards during his sophomore season and was named first-team All-Southern Conference as a returner.

Durden transferred to West Florida after his sophomore year. Durden's first season at West Florida was canceled due to Covid-19. Durden was named first-team All-Gulf South Conference (GSC) after catching 34 passes for 787 yards and 10 touchdowns. Durden repeated as a first-team All-GSC selection as a senior after recording 54 receptions for 1,128 yards and 13 touchdowns.

== Professional career ==
Pre-draft measurables
Height	Weight	Arm length	Hand span	40-yard dash	10-yard split	20-yard split	20-yard shuttle	Three-cone drill	Vertical jump	Broad jump
6 ft 1 1/2 in (1.87 m)	204 lb (93 kg)	30 3/8 in (0.77 m)	9 1/2 in (0.24 m)	4.45 s	1.55 s	2.44 s	4.21 s	7.00 s	37.0 in (0.94 m)	10 ft 7 in (3.23 m)
All values from Pro Day

=== Dallas Cowboys ===
Durden was signed by the Dallas Cowboys as an undrafted free agent on April 30, 2023, shortly after the conclusion of the 2023 NFL draft. Durden suffered a torn anterior cruciate ligament on August 23, and was placed on injured reserve on August 29, causing him to miss the entirety of the season.

Durden was waived by the Cowboys with an injury designation on August 26, 2024.

=== Arlington Renegades ===
On December 20, 2024, Durden signed with the Arlington Renegades of the United Football League (UFL). He was released on April 28, 2025.

=== BC Lions ===
On May 5, 2025, Durden signed with the BC Lions of the Canadian Football League (CFL). He was released on May 21, 2025.
