= Myles Brooks =

American football player (born 2001)

Profile
- Position: Cornerback

Personal information
- Born: January 21, 2001 (age 25); Pflugerville, Texas, U.S.
- Listed height: 6 ft 1 in (1.85 m)
- Listed weight: 198 lb (90 kg)

Career information
- High school: Hendrickson (TX)
- College: Stephen F. Austin (2019–2021); Louisiana Tech (2022)
- NFL draft: 2023: undrafted

Career history
- Dallas Cowboys (2023)*; Montreal Alouettes (2024); Edmonton Elks (2024–2025)*; BC Lions (2025)*
- * Offseason or practice squad member only

Awards and highlights
- Second-team All-C-USA (2022)
- Stats at Pro Football Reference

Myles Brooks (born January 21, 2001) is an American professional football cornerback. He played college football at Stephen F. Austin and Louisiana Tech.

== Early life ==
Brooks was born on January 21, 2001, in Pflugerville, Texas. He attended Hendrickson High School there, at which he played football and basketball. He was given All-District and All-Central Texas honors and earned three varsity letters for the Hendrickson football team, being ranked as a three-star prospect. 247Sports ranked him 28th nationally at his position in the class of 2019.

== College career ==
Brooks had FBS offers from Baylor, Louisiana Tech, FIU, Arkansas and Texas State. He initially committed to Baylor, but then backed out. He then committed to Arkansas, but backed out a second time, before eventually deciding to play for FCS Stephen F. Austin. As a freshman in 2019, Brooks appeared in 10 games and posted 23 tackles, six pass breakups, and one interception. In the 2020 season, he posted 17 total tackles while making an interception in nine games. The following year, he tied for the team lead with four interceptions and posted 25 tackles while appearing in every game. Brooks was named first-team Western Athletic Conference (WAC) and finished his stint at the school with 52 tackles, six interceptions and 17 pass breakups, as he transferred to Louisiana Tech in 2022.

Brooks was named a preseason Phil Steele third-team All-Conference USA selection for Louisiana Tech. He ended up playing all 12 games, starting 10 of them, and earned second-team All-Conference USA after recording 29 tackles, three interceptions, one forced fumble and nine pass breakups. Brooks was one of the best players on the team, as well as best cornerbacks in the conference, and was invited to the East–West Shrine Bowl. In the season, he was targeted a total of 53 times, and only allowed 37.7% of those to be completed. Brooks twice earned Conference USA player of the week honors and was named one time to Pro Football Focus' national team of the week.

== Professional career ==
Pre-draft measurables
Height	Weight	Arm length	Hand span	40-yard dash	10-yard split	20-yard split	20-yard shuttle	Three-cone drill	Vertical jump	Broad jump
6 ft 0 3/4 in (1.85 m)	201 lb (91 kg)	30 3/4 in (0.78 m)	9 1/2 in (0.24 m)	4.51 s	1.56 s	2.59 s	4.51 s	7.27 s	35.0 in (0.89 m)	10 ft 1 in (3.07 m)

=== Dallas Cowboys ===
Brooks was invited to the NFL Scouting Combine. He went unselected in the 2023 NFL draft, and afterwards was signed by the Dallas Cowboys as an undrafted free agent. He was waived on August 29, 2023.

=== Montreal Alouettes ===
Brooks signed with the Montreal Alouettes of the Canadian Football League (CFL) on January 15, 2024. He was moved to the practice roster on June 2, before the start of the season. He was promoted to the active roster on June 10, and was released by the Alouettes on June 17, 2024.

=== Edmonton Elks ===
On September 14, 2024, Brooks was signed to practice squad of the Edmonton Elks. He was released on October 13, 2024.

=== BC Lions ===
On March 18, 2025, Brooks signed with the BC Lions. He was released on May 21, 2025.
