= Tyler Biadasz =

American football player (born 1997)

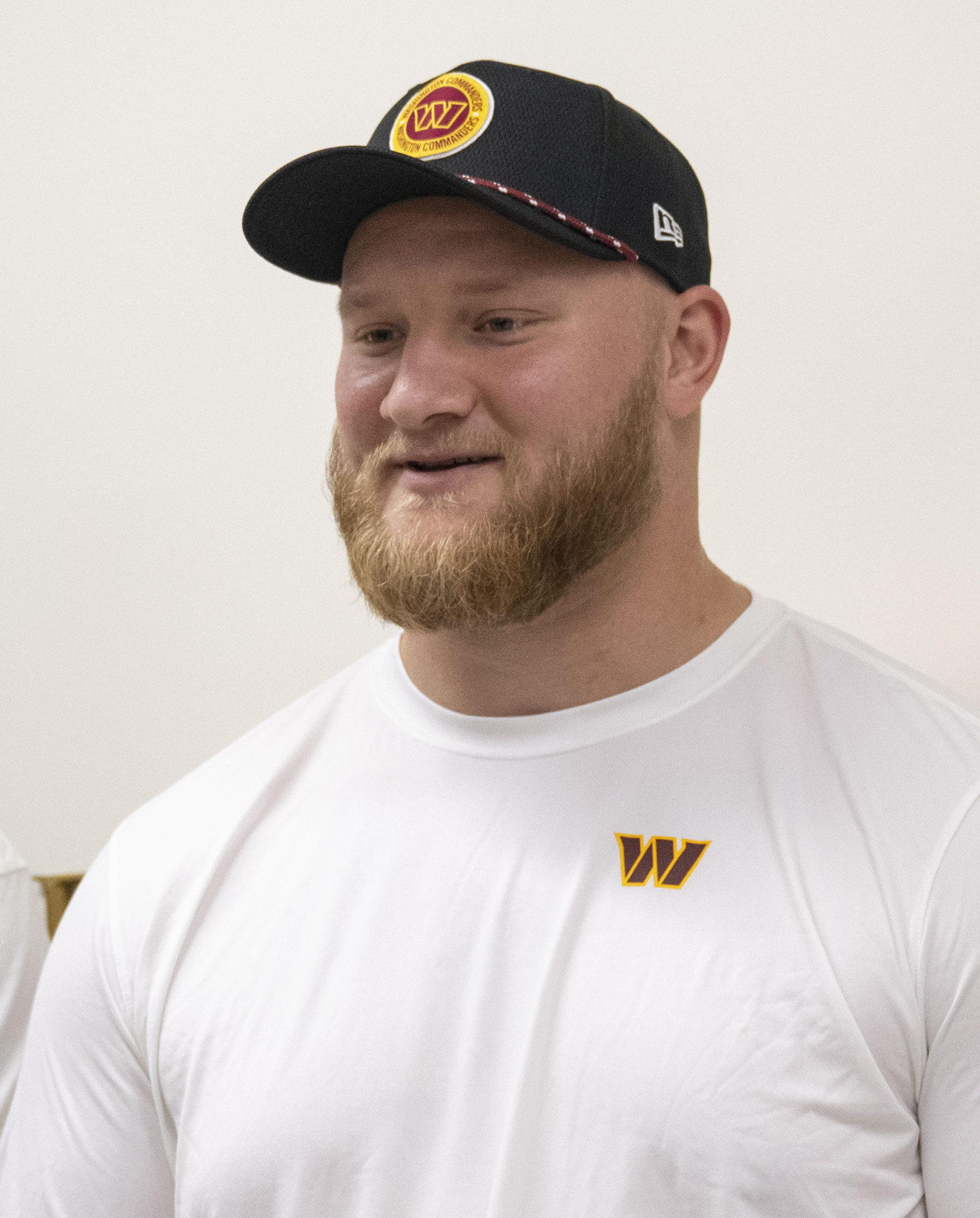
- Biadasz with the Washington Commanders in 2024

No. 63 – Los Angeles Chargers
- Position: Center
- Roster status: Injured reserve

Personal information
- Born: November 20, 1997 (age 28); Amherst, Wisconsin, U.S.
- Listed height: 6 ft 4 in (1.93 m)
- Listed weight: 318 lb (144 kg)

Career information
- High school: Amherst
- College: Wisconsin (2016–2019)
- NFL draft: 2020: 4th round, 146th overall pick

Career history
- Dallas Cowboys (2020–2023); Washington Commanders (2024–2025); Los Angeles Chargers (2026–present)

Awards and highlights
- Pro Bowl (2022); Rimington Trophy (2019); Unanimous All-American (2019); Freshman All-American (2017); 2× First-team All-Big Ten (2018, 2019); Third-team All-Big Ten (2017)

Career NFL statistics as of 2025
- Games played: 92
- Games started: 84
- Stats at Pro Football Reference

Tyler Biadasz (/biˈɑːdɪʃ/ bee-AH-dish; born November 20, 1997) is an American professional football center for the Los Angeles Chargers of the National Football League (NFL). He played college football for the Wisconsin Badgers, where he won the Rimington Trophy in 2019. Biadasz was selected by the Dallas Cowboys in the fourth round of the 2020 NFL draft and has also played for the Washington Commanders.

== Early life ==
Biadasz attended Amherst High School in Amherst, Wisconsin. He was named first-team all-state after his junior and senior seasons as a defensive tackle. The state coaches also named him honorable-mention All-state on offense both years.

As a senior he registered 70 tackles, 7 sacks, 5 forced fumbles and one interception. As a result of his Senior record he received the Tim Krumrie Award as the state of Wisconsin's top high school defensive lineman. He finished his high school career with 232 tackles, 19 sacks, 11 forced fumbles and 3 touchdowns. He also played basketball and baseball.

He committed to Wisconsin on June 8, 2015, after attending a camp on May 31 of that year. He chose Wisconsin over Illinois State, South Dakota State, Southern Illinois, and Western Illinois, all of whom also offered.

== College career ==
Biadasz was redshirted and converted into a center. As a freshman, he started all 14 games, while receiving Freshman All-American and third-team All-Big Ten honors.

As a sophomore, he again served as the anchor of the offensive line and started all 13 games. After the 2018 season, Biadasz consulted with the NFL Draft Advisory Committee and received a grade of "return to school".

In early 2019, Biadasz underwent hip surgery and missed spring practices. Before the season, he was named to preseason All-American teams by College Football News and Sporting News and was also identified as a candidate for the Rimington Award. He started all 14 games, became the first Rimington Trophy winner in school history as the nation's top center and was named a unanimous All-American. He had arthroscopic surgery on the AC joint in his shoulder after the season.

In January 2020, Biadasz announced that he would forgo his senior season and declared for the 2020 NFL draft. He started at center in all of the 41 games of his college career and helped block for running back Jonathan Taylor.

== Professional career ==
Pre-draft measurables
Height	Weight	Arm length	Hand span	Wingspan
6 ft 3 5/8 in (1.92 m)	314 lb (142 kg)	32 1/4 in (0.82 m)	10 in (0.25 m)	6 ft 7 7/8 in (2.03 m)
All values from NFL Combine

=== Dallas Cowboys ===
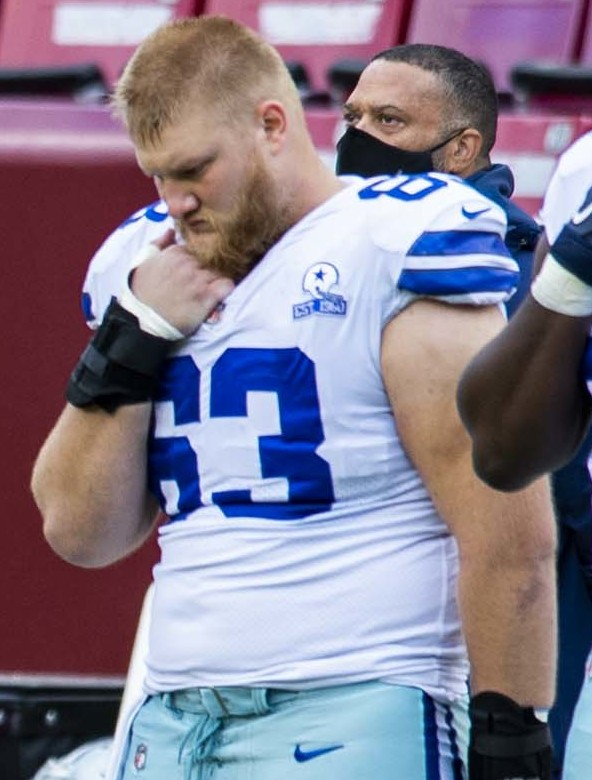
Biadasz with the Dallas Cowboys in 2020

Biadasz was selected by the Dallas Cowboys in the fourth round (146th overall) of the 2020 NFL draft. As a rookie, he replaced an injured Joe Looney in the starting lineup of the fifth game against the New York Giants. He took over the starting center role for 4 straight games, until suffering a severe calf strain injury during warmups, in the ninth game against the Pittsburgh Steelers. He was placed on injured reserve on November 21, 2020. He was activated on December 12, 2020. Looney started at center in the last 8 contests of the season.

In 2021, he started all 17 games at center, helping the offense rank number one in the league in yards per game (407) and points per game (31.2). In the season opener against the Tampa Bay Buccaneers, he contributed in blocking for a 400-yard passer and a pair of 100-yard receivers (ninth time in franchise history).

In 2022, he started in 16 games at center. In Week 17 against the Tennessee Titans, he suffered a high right ankle sprain in the third quarter. He was forced to miss the regular-season finale against the Washington Commanders and was replaced with Connor McGovern. He returned for the playoffs. He participated in the Pro Bowl at the end of the season as the NFC alternate center, since Jason Kelce was playing in the Super Bowl.

In 2023, he started 16 games at center, helping the team rank fifth in the league in overall offense (371.6 yards per game). In the season opener against the New York Giants, he recovered a Tony Pollard fumble near the goal line that led to a touchdown. In Week 2 against the New York Jets, he recovered a CeeDee Lamb fumble after sprinting more than 30 yards down the field to keep the drive alive. He was declared inactive in Week 3 against the Arizona Cardinals, after suffering a hamstring injury during practice and was replaced with Brock Hoffman. He was not re-signed after the season.

=== Washington Commanders ===
Biadasz signed a three-year, $30 million contract with the Washington Commanders on March 15, 2024. He reunited with head coach Dan Quinn, who was the defensive coordinator with the Cowboys. He was acquired to replace Nick Gates and Tyler Larsen as the team's starting center. He started at center in all of the 15 games he played in. He contributed to solidify the team's offensive line and improve the rushing offense (third in the NFL with 154.1 yards per game). He also helped rookie quarterback Jayden Daniels with pre-snap calls. In Week 15 against the New Orleans Saints, he was declared inactive with an illness and was replaced with Michael Deiter.

Biadasz started all 16 of his appearances for Washington during the 2025 season. On December 31, 2025, he was placed on injured reserve due to knee and ankle injuries suffered in Week 17 against the Dallas Cowboys. On February 26, 2026, Biadasz was released by the Commanders with one year remaining on his contract.

=== Los Angeles Chargers ===
On March 6, 2026, Biadasz signed a three-year, $30-million contract with the Los Angeles Chargers. On August 23, he was placed on season-ending injured reserve after sustaining significant damage to his ACL and other knee ligaments during practice.

=== NFL career statistics ===
Year	Team	GP	GS
2020	DAL	12	4
2021	DAL	17	17
2022	DAL	16	16
2023	DAL	16	16
2024	WAS	15	15
2025	WAS	16	16
Career		92	84

== Personal life ==
Biadasz's parents are dairy farmers.
