= Tyler Smith (American football) =

American football player (born 2001)

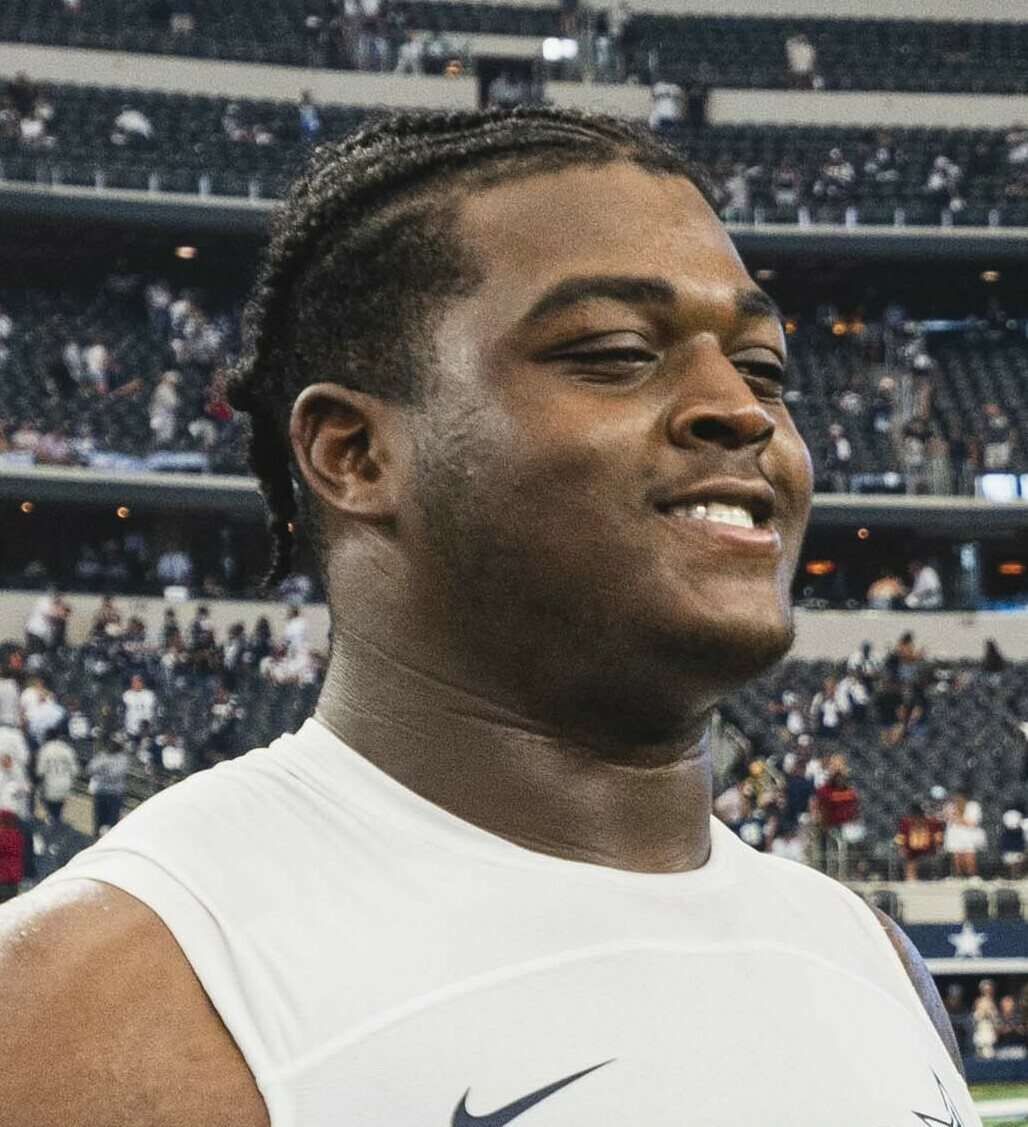
- Smith in 2021

No. 73 – Dallas Cowboys
- Position: Guard
- Roster status: Active

Personal information
- Born: April 3, 2001 (age 25); Fort Worth, Texas, U.S.
- Listed height: 6 ft 5 in (1.96 m)
- Listed weight: 328 lb (149 kg)

Career information
- High school: North Crowley (Fort Worth)
- College: Tulsa (2019–2021)
- NFL draft: 2022: 1st round, 24th overall pick

Career history
- Dallas Cowboys (2022–present)

Awards and highlights
- Second-team All-Pro (2023); 3× Pro Bowl (2023–2025); PFWA All-Rookie Team (2022); First-team All-AAC (2020); Second-team All-AAC (2021)

Career NFL statistics as of 2025
- Games played: 63
- Games started: 63
- Stats at Pro Football Reference

Tyler Smith (born April 3, 2001) is an American professional football guard for the Dallas Cowboys of the National Football League (NFL). He played college football for the Tulsa Golden Hurricane and was selected by the Cowboys in the first round of the 2022 NFL draft.

== Early life ==
Smith grew up in Fort Worth, Texas and attended North Crowley High School. He was rated a three-star recruit and initially committed to play college football for the Abilene Christian Wildcats. Smith decommitted and signed to play at Tulsa over offers from Houston, Navy, and New Mexico.

== College career ==
Smith redshirted the 2019 season, playing in the final four games with two starts as a true freshman. In 2020, Smith started all nine games at left tackle for Tulsa during the team's COVID-19-shortened 2020 season and was named first-team all-American Athletic Conference (AAC). He also was named to the 2020 FWAA all-freshman team. In 2021, he started 12 of the Golden Hurricane's 13 games and was named second team All-AAC as a redshirt sophomore. Following the end of the season, he announced that he would forgo his remaining collegiate eligibility and enter the 2022 NFL draft.

== Professional career ==
Pre-draft measurables
| Height | Weight | Arm length | Hand span | Wingspan | 40-yard dash | 10-yard split | 20-yard split | 20-yard shuttle | Three-cone drill | Vertical jump | Broad jump | Bench press |
|---|---|---|---|---|---|---|---|---|---|---|---|---|
| 6 ft 4 5/8 in (1.95 m) | 324 lb (147 kg) | 34 in (0.86 m) | 10 3/4 in (0.27 m) | 6 ft 11 1/8 in (2.11 m) | 5.02 s | 1.70 s | 2.89 s | 4.65 s | 7.78 s | 27.5 in (0.70 m) | 8 ft 9 in (2.67 m) | 25 reps |
All values from NFL Combine/Pro Day

Smith was selected by the Dallas Cowboys in the first round (24th overall) in the 2022 NFL draft. As a rookie, he started in all 17 games in the 2022 season. He was named to the PFWA All-Rookie Team. In the 2023 season, he appeared in and started 14 games.

On April 27, 2025, the Cowboys picked up the fifth-year option on Smith's contract. He then signed a four-year, $96 million contract extension with $81.2 million guaranteed on September 13, making him the highest-paid guard in the NFL.

On September 7, 2026, Smith was placed on injured reserve after undergoing thumb surgery.

=== NFL career statistics ===
Legend
| **Bold** | Career high |

| Year | Team | Games | | Offense | | | | | |
| Year | Team | GP | GS | Snaps | Pct | Holding | False start | Decl/Pen | Acpt/Pen |
|---|---|---|---|---|---|---|---|---|---|
| 2022 | DAL | 17 | 17 | **1,144** | **99%** | 5 | **4** | **3** | 9 |
| 2023 | DAL | 14 | 14 | 941 | 97% | **6** | 2 | 1 | **10** |
| 2024 | DAL | 16 | 16 | 1,055 | 96% | 2 | 1 | **3** | 4 |
| 2025 | DAL | 16 | 16 | 1,109 | **99%** | 3 | **4** | 2 | 7 |
| Career | | 63 | 63 | 4,249 | - | 16 | 11 | 9 | 30 |
