= 2019 Dallas Cowboys season =

60th season in franchise history

- Owner: Jerry Jones
- General manager: Jerry Jones
- Head coach: Jason Garrett
- Home stadium: AT&T Stadium

Results
- Record: 8–8
- Division place: 2nd NFC East
- Playoffs: Did not qualify
- All-Pros: 1: RG Zack Martin (1st team)
- Pro Bowlers: 6: RB Ezekiel Elliott; WR Amari Cooper; T Tyron Smith; G Zack Martin; C Travis Frederick; MLB Jaylon Smith

Uniform
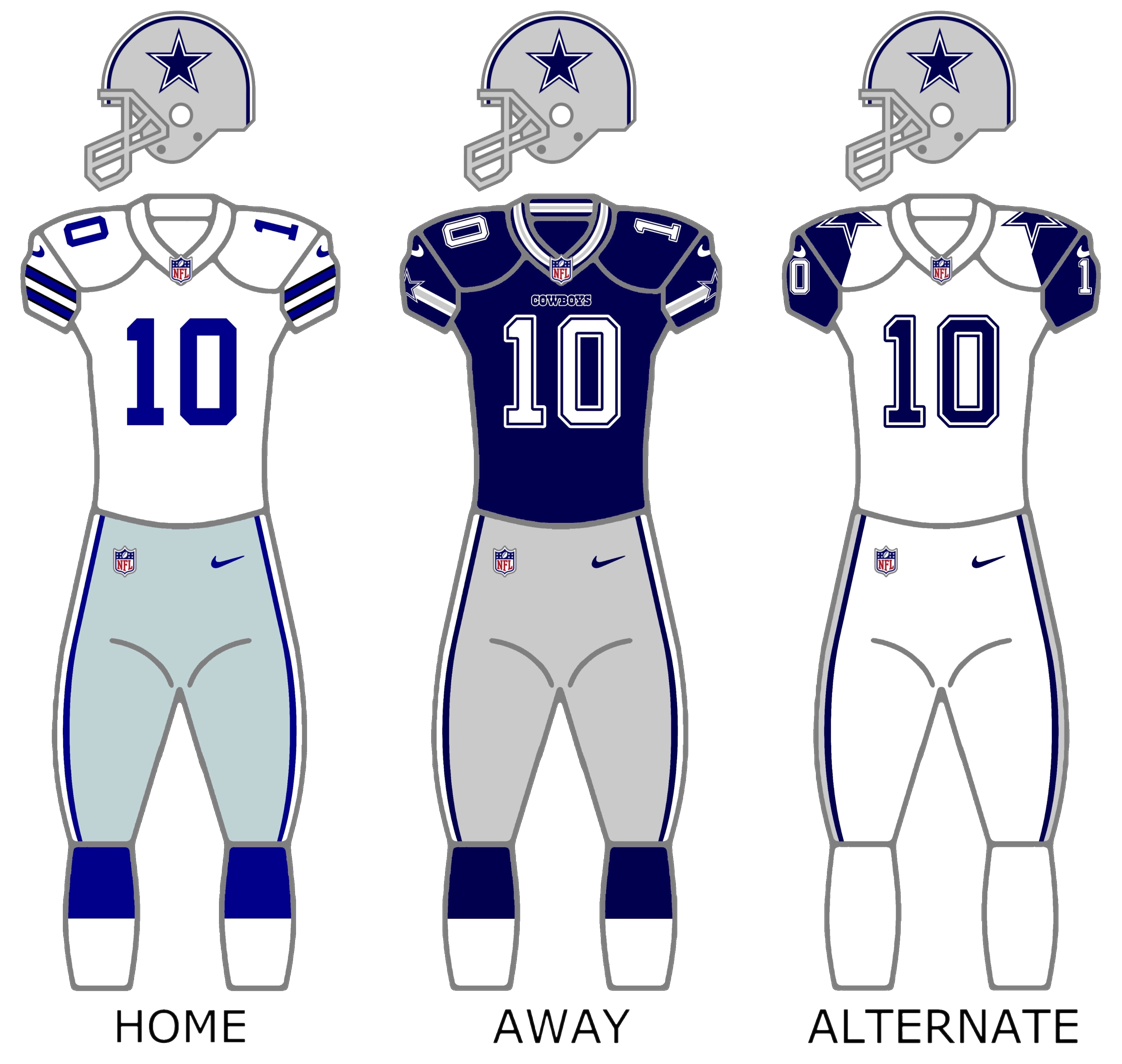

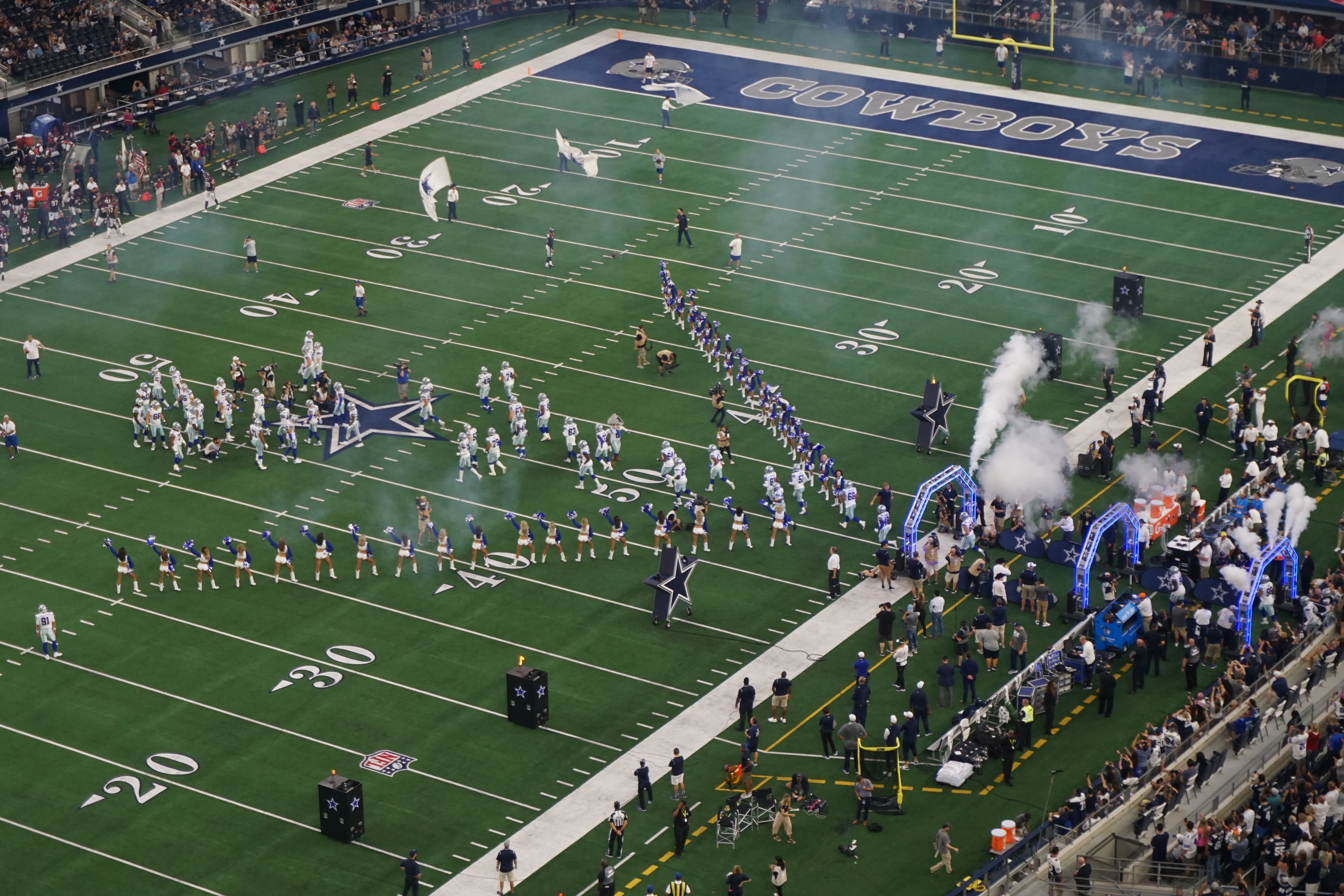
Dallas taking the field before a preseason game against Houston

The 2019 season was the Dallas Cowboys' 60th in the National Football League (NFL), their 11th playing home games at AT&T Stadium and their ninth and final season under head coach Jason Garrett. It also marked the return of tight end Jason Witten, who retired in 2018 and spent a year as the color analyst for Monday Night Football. Wide receiver Cole Beasley, who was the second-longest-tenured player on the roster, left the team in the offseason and signed with the Buffalo Bills.

Despite having won the first three games to start 3–0, the Cowboys lost 8 of the final 13 games, to finish the season 8–8. The Cowboys failed to improve on their 10–6 record from the previous season after a 26–15 loss to the Bills in Week 13 on Thanksgiving Day, and failed to tie that record with a 31–24 loss to the Chicago Bears the next week. After a Week 16 loss to the Philadelphia Eagles, the Cowboys would need both a win over the Washington Redskins and an Eagles loss to the New York Giants in Week 17 to still clinch a playoff berth and a second consecutive division title. The Eagles proceeded to win in Week 17 against the Giants, ensuring Philadelphia would be the 2019 NFC East champions, meaning the Cowboys would fail to defend their division title from 2018 and miss the playoffs for the second time in three years, ending the Cowboys' season.

Head coach Jason Garrett's contract expired at the end of the season. The Cowboys chose not to renew his contract, ending Garrett's tenure in Dallas.

== Offseason ==
=== Signings ===
Position	Player	Age	2018 team	Contract
WR	Randall Cobb	29	Green Bay Packers	1 year, $5 million
TE	Jason Witten	37	Did not play	1 year, $4.5 million
DE	Kerry Hyder	28	Detroit Lions	1 year, $1 million
DT	Christian Covington	26	Houston Texans	1 year, $2.5 million

=== Re-signings ===
Position	Player	Age	Contract
FB	Jamize Olawale	30	3 years, $5.4 million
WR	Tavon Austin	29	1 year, $1.75 million
OT	Cameron Fleming	27	2 years, $7.5 million
DE	DeMarcus Lawrence	27	5 years, $105 million
DT	Daniel Ross	26	1 year, $645,000
OLB	Justin March	26	1 year, $720,000
FS	Darian Thompson	26	1 year, $720,000
LS	L. P. Ladouceur	38	1 year, $1.03 million

=== Trade acquisitions ===
Position	Player	Age	2018 team	Contract	Traded away
DE	Robert Quinn	29	Miami Dolphins	1 year, $8 million	2020 6th-round pick (John Penisini)

=== Departures ===
Position	Player	Age	2019 team
RB	Rod Smith	27	Oakland Raiders
WR	Cole Beasley	30	Buffalo Bills
WR	Allen Hurns	28	Miami Dolphins
WR	Terrance Williams	30	Joined XFL
TE	Rico Gathers	25	Unsigned
TE	Geoff Swaim	26	Jacksonville Jaguars
OT/OG	Parker Ehinger	27	Baltimore Ravens
OG	Marcus Martin	26	Unsigned
DE	Taco Charlton	25	Miami Dolphins
DE	Datone Jones	29	Unsigned
DT	David Irving	26	Retired
DT	Caraun Reid	28	Arizona Cardinals
OLB	Damien Wilson	26	Kansas City Chiefs
FS	Marqueston Huff	27	Joined XFL
K	Brett Maher	30	Unsigned

== NFL draft ==
2019 Dallas Cowboys draft
Round	Pick	Player	Position	College	Notes
2	59	Trysten Hill	DT	Central Florida	
3	90	Connor McGovern	OG	Penn St	
4	128	Tony Pollard *	RB	Memphis	
5	158	Michael Jackson	CB	Miami (FL)	
5	165	Joe Jackson	DE	Miami (FL)	
6	213	Donovan Wilson	S	Texas A&M	
7	218	Mike Weber	RB	Ohio State	
7	241	Jalen Jelks	DE	Oregon	
Made roster † Pro Football Hall of Fame * Made at least one Pro Bowl during career

Notes

- The Cowboys traded their 2019 first-round draft pick to the Raiders in exchange for WR Amari Cooper.
- The Cowboys traded a conditional 2019 sixth-round draft pick in September 2017 to the Bengals in exchange for CB Bene Benwikere.
- As a result of a negative differential of free agent signings and departures that the Cowboys experienced during the 2018 free agency period, the team received one compensatory selection in the fourth round of the 2019 NFL draft.

== Staff ==
2019 Dallas Cowboys staff
Front office: Owner/president/general manager – Jerry Jones; COO/executive vice president/director of player personnel – Stephen Jones; Senior director of football operations/football administration – Todd Williams; Director of salary cap & player contracts – Adam Prasifka; Vice president player personnel – Will McClay; Director of college scouting – Lionel Vital; Director of pro scouting – Alex Loomis; Assistant director of college scouting – Chris Hall; Director of football research – Tom Robinson; Head coaches: Head coach – Jason Garrett; Offensive coaches: Offensive coordinator – Kellen Moore; Quarterbacks – Jon Kitna; Running backs – Gary Brown; Wide receivers – Sanjay Lal; Assistant wide receivers – Kyle Valero; Tight ends – Doug Nussmeier; Offensive line – Marc Colombo; Assistant offensive line – Adam Kleffner; Offensive assistant – Stephen Brown; Coaching advisor – Hudson Houck	Defensive coaches: Defensive coordinator/defensive line – Rod Marinelli; Defensive tackles – Leon Lett; Linebackers – Ben Bloom; Passing game coordinator/defensive backs – Kris Richard; Safeties – Greg Jackson; Defensive assistant – Ken Amato; Defensive assistant – Andre Gurode; Special teams coaches: Special teams coordinator – Keith O'Quinn; Strength and conditioning: Director of strength and conditioning – Mike Woicik; Strength and conditioning – Brett Bech; Strength and conditioning – Markus Paul; Assistant strength and conditioning – Kendall Smith

== Rosters ==
=== Opening preseason roster ===
Dallas Cowboys 2019 opening preseason roster
Quarterbacks: 5 Taryn Christion; 4 Dak Prescott; 7 Cooper Rush; 3 Mike White; Running backs: 46 Jordan Chunn; 26 Darius Jackson; 23 Alfred Morris; 49 Jamize Olawale FB; 36 Tony Pollard; 40 Mike Weber; 42 Ryan Yurachek FB; Wide receivers: 10 Tavon Austin; 19 Amari Cooper; 18 Randall Cobb; 11 Reggie Davis; 13 Michael Gallup; 83 Jalen Guyton; 81 Jon'Vea Johnson; 15 Devin Smith; 16 Cedrick Wilson Jr.; Tight ends: 89 Blake Jarwin; 80 Marcus Lucas; 84 Codey McElroy; 86 Dalton Schultz; 82 Jason Witten	Offensive linemen: 60 Juwann Bushell-Beatty T; 63 Jake Campos T; 71 La'el Collins T; 75 Cameron Fleming T; 72 Travis Frederick C; 65 Mitch Hyatt T; 69 Brandon Knight T/G; 73 Joe Looney C/G; 70 Zack Martin G; 66 Connor McGovern G/C; 62 Lukayus McNeil G; 61 Adam Redmond C/G; 77 Tyron Smith T; 76 Xavier Su'a-Filo G; 78 Cody Wichmann G; 52 Connor Williams G; Defensive linemen: 92 Dorance Armstrong Jr. DE; 97 Taco Charlton DE; 96 Maliek Collins DT; 95 Christian Covington DT; 79 Trysten Hill DT; 51 Kerry Hyder DE; 56 Joe Jackson DE; 74 Jalen Jelks DE; 58 Robert Quinn DE; 93 Daniel Ross DT; 67 Shakir Soto DT; 68 Ricky Walker DT; 64 Daniel Wise DT/DE; 99 Antwaun Woods DT	Linebackers: 59 Chris Covington OLB/MLB; 57 Luke Gifford MLB/OLB; 43 Nate Hall MLB/OLB; 50 Sean Lee OLB; 53 Justin March-Lillard OLB; 44 Justin Phillips MLB/OLB; 41 Kyle Queiro OLB/MLB; 54 Jaylon Smith MLB; 48 Joe Thomas OLB/MLB; 55 Leighton Vander Esch OLB; Defensive backs: 24 Chidobe Awuzie CB; 30 Anthony Brown CB; 34 Treston Decoud CB/FS; 35 Kavon Frazier SS/FS; 29 C. J. Goodwin CB; 38 Jeff Heath SS; 20 George Iloka SS; 33 Mike Jackson Sr. CB; 27 Jourdan Lewis CB; 32 Donovan Olumba CB; 45 Tyvis Powell CB/SS; 28 Jameill Showers SS; 23 Darian Thompson FS; 39 Chris Westry CB; 37 Donovan Wilson FS/SS; 25 Xavier Woods FS; Special teams: 6 Chris Jones P; 91 L. P. Ladouceur LS; 2 Brett Maher K; 1 Kasey Redfern P/K; 47 Drew Scott LS	Reserve lists: 85 Noah Brown WR (active/PUP); 98 Tyrone Crawford DT/DE (active/PUP); -- Andrew Dowell OLB (IR); 21 Ezekiel Elliott RB (did not report); 94 Randy Gregory DE (suspended); 31 Byron Jones CB (active/PUP); 90 DeMarcus Lawrence DE (active/PUP); 14 Lance Lenoir WR (IR); -- Derrick Puni T (IR); 90 active, 5 inactive

=== Week one roster ===
Dallas Cowboys 2019 week one roster
Quarterbacks: 4 Dak Prescott; 7 Cooper Rush; Running backs: 46 Jordan Chunn; 21 Ezekiel Elliott; 49 Jamize Olawale FB; 20 Tony Pollard; Wide receivers: 10 Tavon Austin; 19 Amari Cooper; 18 Randall Cobb; 13 Michael Gallup; 15 Devin Smith; Tight ends: 89 Blake Jarwin; 86 Dalton Schultz; 82 Jason Witten	Offensive linemen: 71 La'el Collins T; 75 Cameron Fleming T; 72 Travis Frederick C; 69 Brandon Knight G/T; 73 Joe Looney C/G; 70 Zack Martin G; 61 Adam Redmond C/G; 77 Tyron Smith T; 76 Xavier Su'a-Filo G; 52 Connor Williams G; Defensive linemen: 92 Dorance Armstrong Jr. DE; 97 Taco Charlton DE; 96 Maliek Collins DT; 95 Christian Covington DT; 98 Tyrone Crawford DE/DT; 79 Trysten Hill DT; 51 Kerry Hyder DE/DT; 56 Joe Jackson DE; 90 DeMarcus Lawrence DE; 99 Antwaun Woods DT	Linebackers: 57 Luke Gifford MLB/OLB; 50 Sean Lee OLB; 53 Justin March OLB; 54 Jaylon Smith MLB; 48 Joe Thomas OLB/MLB; 55 Leighton Vander Esch OLB; Defensive backs: 24 Chidobe Awuzie CB; 30 Anthony Brown CB; 35 Kavon Frazier SS/FS; 29 C. J. Goodwin CB; 38 Jeff Heath SS; 31 Byron Jones CB; 27 Jourdan Lewis CB; 23 Darian Thompson FS; 37 Donovan Wilson FS/SS; 25 Xavier Woods FS; Special teams: 6 Chris Jones P; 91 L. P. Ladouceur LS; 2 Brett Maher K	Reserve lists: 85 Noah Brown WR (PUP); 94 Randy Gregory DE (suspended); 74 Jalen Jelks DE (IR); 81 Jon'Vea Johnson WR (IR); 14 Lance Lenoir WR (IR); 66 Connor McGovern G/C (IR); -- Derrick Puni T (IR); 58 Robert Quinn DE (suspended); 93 Daniel Ross DT (IR); -- Jameill Showers SS/FS (IR); 39 Chris Westry CB (IR); 78 Cody Wichmann G (IR); Practice squad: 83 Ventell Bryant WR; 59 Chris Covington OLB/MLB; 87 Cole Hikutini TE; 65 Mitch Hyatt T; 33 Mike Jackson Sr. CB; 26 Donovan Olumba CB; 5 Clayton Thorson QB; 28 Mike Weber RB; 11 Cedrick Wilson Jr. WR; 64 Daniel Wise DT/DE; 53 active, 12 inactive, 10 practice squad

=== Final roster ===
2019 Dallas Cowboys roster
Quarterbacks (QB): 4 Dak Prescott; 7 Cooper Rush; Running backs (RB): 21 Ezekiel Elliott; 49 Jamize Olawale FB; 20 Tony Pollard; Wide receivers (WR): 10 Tavon Austin; 83 Ventell Bryant; 19 Amari Cooper; 18 Randall Cobb; 13 Michael Gallup; 15 Devin Smith; Tight ends (TE): 89 Blake Jarwin; 86 Dalton Schultz; 82 Jason Witten	Offensive linemen (OL): 71 La'el Collins T; 75 Cameron Fleming T; 72 Travis Frederick C; 65 Mitch Hyatt T; 69 Brandon Knight T; 73 Joe Looney C/G; 70 Zack Martin G; 67 Wyatt Miller T; 77 Tyron Smith T; Defensive linemen (DL): 92 Dorance Armstrong DE; 79 Michael Bennett DE; 96 Maliek Collins DT; 95 Christian Covington DT; 97 Trysten Hill DT; 51 Kerry Hyder DE; 56 Joe Jackson DE; 90 DeMarcus Lawrence DE; 58 Robert Quinn DE; 99 Antwaun Woods DT	Linebackers (LB): 41 Ray-Ray Armstrong MLB; 59 Chris Covington OLB; 50 Sean Lee OLB; 53 Justin March-Lillard OLB; 54 Jaylon Smith MLB; 43 Malcolm Smith OLB; 48 Joe Thomas; Defensive backs (DB): 24 Chidobe Awuzie CB; 33 Deante Burton CB; 29 C. J. Goodwin CB; 38 Jeff Heath SS; 31 Byron Jones CB; 27 Jourdan Lewis CB; 32 Donovan Olumba CB; 23 Darian Thompson S; 37 Donovan Wilson S; 25 Xavier Woods SS; Special teams (ST): 3 Kai Forbath K; 6 Chris Jones P; 91 L. P. Ladouceur LS	Practice squad: 46 Jordan Chunn RB; 62 Marcus Henry C; 87 Cole Hikutini TE; 17 Tevin Jones WR; 68 Tyler Jones T/G; 5 Clayton Thorson QB; 28 Mike Weber RB; 36 D. J. White CB; 64 Daniel Wise DT/DE; Reserve: 30 Anthony Brown CB (IR); 85 Noah Brown WR (PUP); 98 Tyrone Crawford DE (IR); 35 Kavon Frazier SS (IR); 57 Luke Gifford (IR); 94 Randy Gregory DE (Susp.); 74 Jalen Jelks DE (IR); 81 Jon'Vea Johnson WR (IR); 14 Lance Lenoir WR (IR); 66 Connor McGovern G (IR); 61 Adam Redmond C/G (IR); 93 Daniel Ross DT (IR); 76 Xavier Suʻa-Filo G (IR); 55 Leighton Vander Esch OLB (IR); 39 Chris Westry CB (IR); 78 Cody Wichmann G (IR); 52 Connor Williams G (IR); 11 Cedrick Wilson Jr. WR (IR); Rookies in italics 53 active, 18 reserve, 9 practice squad

== Preseason ==
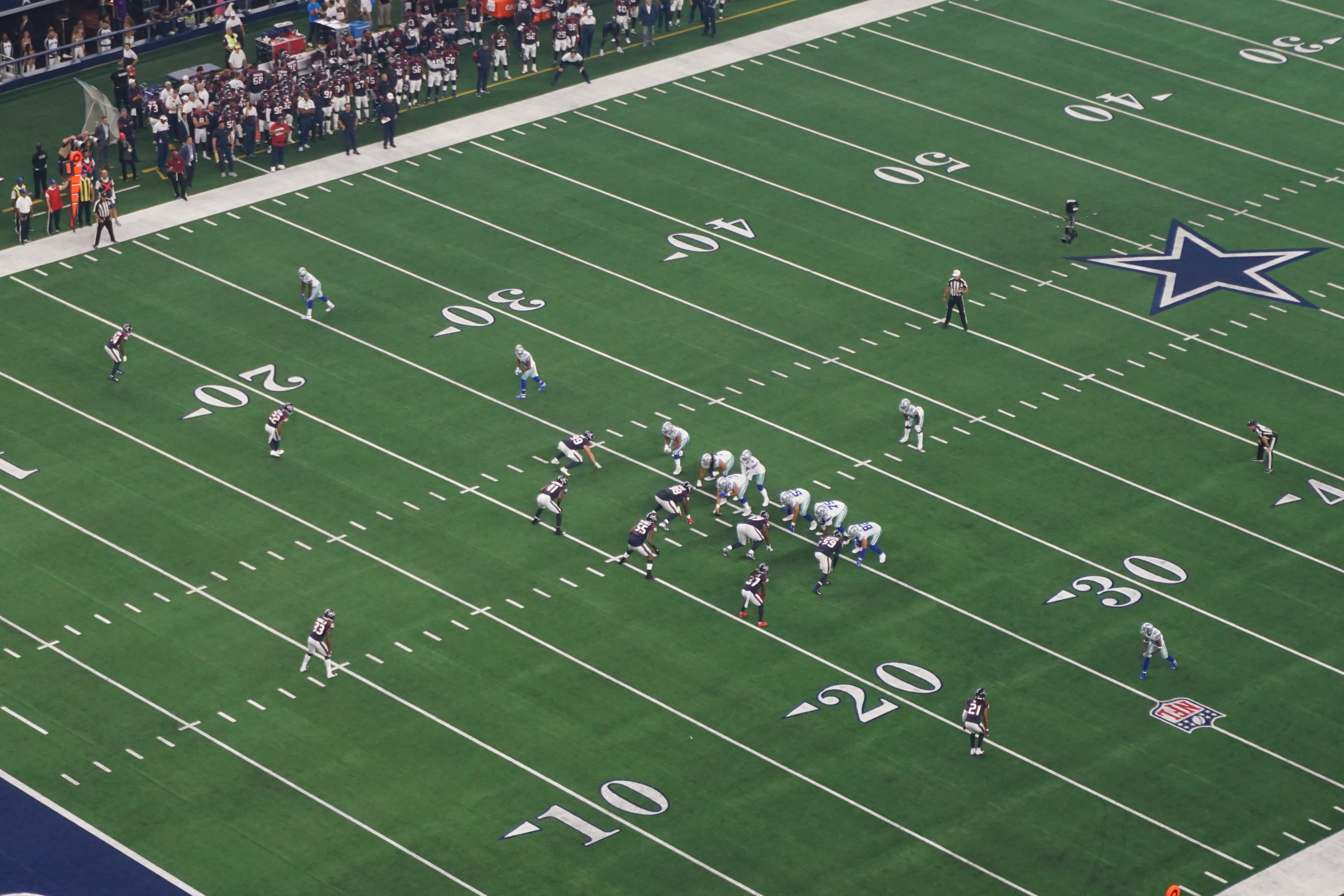
Dallas on offense against Houston

On March 21, the exhibition matchup between the Cowboys and the Los Angeles Rams was officially announced for Saturday, August 17, at Aloha Stadium just outside of Honolulu, Hawaii, with the Rams serving as the home team.

Week	Date	Opponent	Result	Record	Game site	NFL.com recap
1	August 10	at San Francisco 49ers	L 9–17	0–1	Levi's Stadium	Recap
2	August 17	at Los Angeles Rams	W 14–10	1–1	Aloha Stadium (Honolulu)	Recap
3	August 24	Houston Texans	W 34–0	2–1	AT&T Stadium	Recap
4	August 29	Tampa Bay Buccaneers	L 15–17	2–2	AT&T Stadium	Recap

== Regular season ==
=== Schedule ===
The Cowboys' 2019 schedule was announced on April 17.

Week	Date	Opponent	Result	Record	Venue	NFL.com recap
1	September 8	**New York Giants**	**W** 35–17	1–0	AT&T Stadium	Recap
2	September 15	at **Washington Redskins**	**W** 31–21	2–0	FedExField	Recap
3	September 22	Miami Dolphins	**W** 31–6	3–0	AT&T Stadium	Recap
4	September 29	at New Orleans Saints	**L** 10–12	3–1	Mercedes-Benz Superdome	Recap
5	October 6	Green Bay Packers	**L** 24–34	3–2	AT&T Stadium	Recap
6	October 13	at New York Jets	**L** 22–24	3–3	MetLife Stadium	Recap
7	October 20	**Philadelphia Eagles**	**W** 37–10	4–3	AT&T Stadium	Recap
8	Bye					
9	November 4	at **New York Giants**	**W** 37–18	5–3	MetLife Stadium	Recap
10	November 10	Minnesota Vikings	**L** 24–28	5–4	AT&T Stadium	Recap
11	November 17	at Detroit Lions	**W** 35–27	6–4	Ford Field	Recap
12	November 24	at New England Patriots	**L** 9–13	6–5	Gillette Stadium	Recap
13	November 28	Buffalo Bills	**L** 15–26	6–6	AT&T Stadium	Recap
14	December 5	at Chicago Bears	**L** 24–31	6–7	Soldier Field	Recap
15	December 15	Los Angeles Rams	**W** 44–21	7–7	AT&T Stadium	Recap
16	December 22	at **Philadelphia Eagles**	**L** 9–17	7–8	Lincoln Financial Field	Recap
17	December 29	**Washington Redskins**	**W** 47–16	8–8	AT&T Stadium	Recap

Note: Intra-division opponents are in bold text.

=== Game summaries ===
==== Week 1: vs. New York Giants ====
Week One: New York Giants at Dallas Cowboys – Game summary

Quarter	1	2	3	4	Total
Giants	7	0	3	7	**17**
**Cowboys**	7	14	14	0	**35**

at AT&T Stadium, Arlington, Texas

- Date: September 8
- Game time: 3:25 p.m. CDT
- Game weather: Played indoors (retractable roof closed)
- Game attendance: 90,353
- Referee: Walt Anderson
- TV announcers (Fox): Joe Buck, Troy Aikman and Erin Andrews
- Recap, Game Book

Game information

**First quarter**

- NYG – Evan Engram 1-yard pass from Eli Manning (Aldrick Rosas kick), 8:06. Giants 7–0. **Drive: 7 plays, 91 yards, 4:07.**
- DAL – Blake Jarwin 28-yard pass from Dak Prescott (Brett Maher kick), 3:19. Tied 7–7. **Drive: 11 plays, 75 yards, 4:47.**

**Second quarter**

- DAL – Jason Witten 4-yard pass from Dak Prescott (Brett Maher kick), 10:19. Cowboys 14–7. **Drive: 9 plays, 93 yards, 4:59.**
- DAL – Amari Cooper 21-yard pass from Dak Prescott (Brett Maher kick), 1:13. Cowboys 21–7. **Drive: 13 plays, 83 yards, 6:43.**

**Third quarter**

- NYG – Aldrick Rosas 28-yard field goal, 10:59. Cowboys 21–10. **Drive: 11 plays, 75 yards, 4:01.**
- DAL – Randall Cobb 25-yard pass from Dak Prescott (Brett Maher kick), 9:48. Cowboys 28–10. **Drive: 3 plays, 75 yards, 1:11.**
- DAL – Ezekiel Elliott 10-yard run (Brett Maher kick), 1:14. Cowboys 35–10. **Drive: 7 plays, 89 yards, 3:59.**

**Fourth quarter**

- NYG – Wayne Gallman 2-yard run (Aldrick Rosas kick), 2:49. Cowboys 35–17. **Drive: 6 plays, 75 yards, 2:25.**

**Top passers**

- NYG – Eli Manning – 30/44, 306 yards, TD
- DAL – Dak Prescott – 25/32, 405 yards, 4 TD

**Top rushers**

- NYG – Saquon Barkley – 11 rushes, 120 yards
- DAL – Ezekiel Elliott – 13 rushes, 53 yards, TD

**Top receivers**

- NYG – Evan Engram – 11 receptions, 116 yards, TD
- DAL – Michael Gallup – 7 receptions, 158 yards

In the season opener, the Cowboys scored in 5 consecutive drives, the longest streak in Cowboys history, despite Evan Engram scoring a touchdown first in this game. After that, it was all Dallas the rest of the way. The win allowed the Cowboys to start 1-0.

Rookie quarterback Daniel Jones would end up playing the remainder of the game for Eli Manning when Manning was removed from the game due to a coaching decision made by head coach Pat Shurmur. This would be Manning's last game he played against the Cowboys, as he did not play in their second game in MetLife Stadium due to Jones being the starter since week 3 of the season.

==== Week 2: at Washington Redskins ====
Week Two: Dallas Cowboys at Washington Redskins – Game summary

Quarter	1	2	3	4	Total
**Cowboys**	0	14	7	10	**31**
Redskins	0	7	7	7	**21**

at FedEx Field, Landover, Maryland

- Date: September 15
- Game time: 1:00 p.m. EDT/12:00 p.m. CDT
- Game weather: Sunny, 80 °F (27 °C)
- Game attendance: 75,128
- Referee: Shawn Hochuli
- TV announcers (Fox): Kevin Burkhardt, Charles Davis and Pam Oliver
- Recap, Game Book

Game information

**First quarter**

- No scoring plays.

**Second quarter**

- WAS – Adrian Peterson 1-yard run (Dustin Hopkins kick), 14:15. Redskins 7–0. **Drive: 10 plays, 38 yards, 5:53.**
- DAL – Devin Smith 51-yard pass from Dak Prescott (Brett Maher kick), 6:10. Tied 7–7. **Drive: 7 plays, 97 yards, 3:34.**
- DAL – Jason Witten 2-yard pass from Dak Prescott (Brett Maher kick), 0:09. Cowboys 14–7. **Drive: 11 plays, 83 yards, 4:23.**

**Third quarter**

- DAL – Amari Cooper 10-yard pass from Dak Prescott (Brett Maher kick), 9:58. Cowboys 21–7. **Drive: 9 plays, 75 yards, 5:02.**
- WAS – Paul Richardson 9-yard pass from Case Keenum (Dustin Hopkins kick), 4:30. Cowboys 21–14. **Drive: 11 plays, 75 yards, 5:28.**

**Fourth quarter**

- DAL – Brett Maher 25-yard field goal, 13:51. Cowboys 24–14. **Drive: 11 plays, 68 yards, 5:39.**
- DAL – Ezekiel Elliott 2-yard run (Brett Maher kick), 5:07. Cowboys 31–14. **Drive: 10 plays, 54 yards, 5:57.**
- WAS – Terry McLaurin 1-yard pass from Case Keenum (Dustin Hopkins kick), 2:17. Cowboys 31–21. **Drive: 11 plays, 75 yards, 2:50.**

**Top passers**

- DAL – Dak Prescott – 26/30, 269 yards, 3 TD, INT
- WAS – Case Keenum – 26/37, 221 yards, 2 TD

**Top rushers**

- DAL – Ezekiel Elliott – 23 rushes, 111 yards, TD
- WAS – Adrian Peterson – 10 rushes, 25 yards, TD

**Top receivers**

- DAL – Devin Smith – 3 receptions, 74 yards, TD
- WAS – Terry McLaurin – 5 receptions, 62 yards, TD

The game started with Montae Nicholson obtaining an interception, which would allow the Redskins to score the next drive. The Cowboys responded with a touchdown pass to Devin Smith to tie the game at 7-7. They would claim the lead, via a touchdown pass to veteran tight end Jason Witten before halftime. The Redskins would respond back after another touchdown scored by the Cowboys. Ezekiel Elliott would run for a first down to clinch the game, allowing the Cowboys to run out the clock. The game ended with Dak Prescott and Elliott rushing for 180 combined yards. This win would improve the Cowboys to 2-0.

==== Week 3: vs. Miami Dolphins ====
Week Three: Miami Dolphins at Dallas Cowboys – Game summary

Quarter	1	2	3	4	Total
Dolphins	3	3	0	0	**6**
**Cowboys**	10	0	14	7	**31**

at AT&T Stadium, Arlington, Texas

- Date: September 22
- Game time: 12:00 p.m. CDT
- Game weather: None (retractable roof closed)
- Game attendance: 90,127
- Referee: Adrian Hill
- TV announcers (Fox): Kevin Burkhardt, Charles Davis and Pam Oliver
- Recap, Game Book

Game information

**First quarter**

- DAL – Brett Maher 28-yard field goal, 10:27. Cowboys 3–0. **Drive: 8 plays, 53 yards, 2:53.**
- DAL – Amari Cooper 5-yard pass from Dak Prescott (Brett Maher kick), 5:57. Cowboys 10–0. **Drive: 9 plays, 54 yards, 3:26.**
- MIA – Jason Sanders 22-yard field goal, 0:53. Cowboys 10–3. **Drive: 10 plays, 72 yards, 5:04.**

**Second quarter**

- MIA – Jason Sanders 33-yard field goal, 5:48. Cowboys 10–6. **Drive: 10 plays, 49 yards, 4:45.**

**Third quarter**

- DAL – Amari Cooper 19-yard pass from Dak Prescott (Brett Maher kick), 12:28. Cowboys 17–6. **Drive: 5 plays, 75 yards, 2:32.**
- DAL – Dak Prescott 8-yard run (Brett Maher kick), 3:30. Cowboys 24–6. **Drive: 9 plays, 76 yards, 5:28.**

**Fourth quarter**

- DAL – Tony Pollard 16-yard run (Brett Maher kick), 3:45. Cowboys 31–6. **Drive: 5 plays, 60 yards, 1:42.**

**Top passers**

- MIA – Josh Rosen – 18/39, 200 yards
- DAL – Dak Prescott – 19/32, 246 yards, 2 TD, INT

**Top rushers**

- MIA – Kenyan Drake – 12 rushes, 38 yards
- DAL – Ezekiel Elliott – 19 rushes, 125 yards

**Top receivers**

- MIA – Preston Williams – 4 receptions, 68 yards
- DAL – Amari Cooper – 6 receptions, 88 yards, 2 TD

As historic Vegas favorites (22 points), both Ezekiel Elliott and Tony Pollard obtained 100+ rushing yards in one game. The game started with a missed field goal from the Dolphins. The Cowboys also denied the Dolphins a touchdown when DeMarcus Lawrence recovered a fumble at the Dallas 7-yard line. After this, it was all Dallas the rest of the way. This win improved the Cowboys to 3-0.

==== Week 4: at New Orleans Saints ====
Week Four: Dallas Cowboys at New Orleans Saints – Game summary

Quarter	1	2	3	4	Total
Cowboys	3	0	7	0	**10**
**Saints**	0	9	0	3	**12**

at Mercedes-Benz, New Orleans, Louisiana

- Date: September 29
- Game time: 7:20 p.m. CDT
- Game weather: None (indoor stadium)
- Game attendance: 73,086
- Referee: Carl Cheffers
- TV announcers (NBC): Al Michaels, Cris Collinsworth, Michele Tafoya and Terry McAulay
- Recap, Game Book

Game information

**First quarter**

- DAL – Brett Maher 28-yard field goal, 5:08. Cowboys 3–0. **Drive: 9 plays, 44 yards, 3:34.**

**Second quarter**

- NO – Wil Lutz 40-yard field goal, 14:55. Tied 3–3. **Drive: 9 plays, 52 yards, 5:13.**
- NO – Wil Lutz 42-yard field goal, 8:42. Saints 6–3. **Drive: 7 plays, 27 yards, 4:45.**
- NO – Wil Lutz 19-yard field goal, 0:00. Saints 9–3. **Drive: 8 plays, 43 yards, 1:30.**

**Third quarter**

- DAL – Ezekiel Elliott 1-yard run (Brett Maher kick), 7:47. Cowboys 10–9. **Drive: 11 plays, 84 yards, 5:44.**

**Fourth quarter**

- NO – Wil Lutz 26-yard field goal, 13:41. Saints 12–10. **Drive: 15 plays, 67 yards, 9:06.**

**Top passers**

- DAL – Dak Prescott – 22/33, 223 yards, INT
- NO – Teddy Bridgewater – 23/30, 193 yards, INT

**Top rushers**

- DAL – Ezekiel Elliott – 18 rushes, 35 yards, TD
- NO – Alvin Kamara – 17 rushes, 69 yards

**Top receivers**

- DAL – Jason Witten – 4 receptions, 50 yards
- NO – Michael Thomas – 9 receptions, 95 yards

The game would be neck-to-neck all the way. Chidobe Awuzie and the Cowboys recorded their first interception of the season. Despite a strong defense and allowing no touchdowns, they would drop to 3-1 with the loss. This game practically mimicked the previous year's game between these two teams in Dallas where it was mainly a defensive battle.

==== Week 5: vs. Green Bay Packers ====
Week Five: Green Bay Packers at Dallas Cowboys – Game summary

Quarter	1	2	3	4	Total
**Packers**	14	3	14	3	**34**
Cowboys	0	0	10	14	**24**

at AT&T Stadium, Arlington, Texas

- Date: October 6
- Game time: 3:25 p.m. CDT
- Game weather: None (retractable roof closed)
- Game attendance: 93,024
- Referee: Ronald Torbert
- TV announcers (Fox): Joe Buck, Troy Aikman and Erin Andrews
- Recap, Game Book

Game information

**First quarter**

- GB – Aaron Jones 18-yard run (Mason Crosby kick), 8:57. Packers 7–0. **Drive: 5 plays, 47 yards, 1:29.**
- GB – Aaron Jones 3-yard run (Mason Crosby kick), 0:03. Packers 14–0. **Drive: 9 plays, 89 yards, 5:20.**

**Second quarter**

- GB – Mason Crosby 20-yard field goal, 2:19. Packers 17–0. **Drive: 12 plays, 79 yards, 6:03.**

**Third quarter**

- GB – Aaron Jones 5-yard run (Mason Crosby kick), 9:33. Packers 24–0. **Drive: 7 plays, 58 yards, 3:53.**
- DAL – Brett Maher 36-yard field goal, 5:54. Packers 24–3. **Drive: 11 plays, 57 yards, 3:39.**
- GB – Aaron Jones 1-yard run (Mason Crosby kick), 3:30. Packers 31–3. **Drive: 4 plays, 79 yards, 2:24.**
- DAL – Michael Gallup 40-yard pass from Dak Prescott (Brett Maher kick), 2:00. Packers 31–10. **Drive: 6 plays, 75 yards, 1:30.**

**Fourth quarter**

- DAL – Ezekiel Elliott 2-yard run (Brett Maher kick), 13:52. Packers 31–17. **Drive: 5 plays, 70 yards, 1:27.**
- GB – Mason Crosby 38-yard field goal, 8:07. Packers 34–17. **Drive: 4 plays, 9 yards, 2:14.**
- DAL – Amari Cooper 53-yard pass from Dak Prescott (Brett Maher kick), 7:46. Packers 34–24. **Drive: 2 plays, 75 yards, 0:21.**

**Top passers**

- GB – Aaron Rodgers – 22/34, 238 yards
- DAL – Dak Prescott – 27/44, 463 yards, 2 TD, 3 INT

**Top rushers**

- GB – Aaron Jones – 19 rushes, 107 yards, 4 TD
- DAL – Ezekiel Elliott – 12 rushes, 62 yards, TD

**Top receivers**

- GB – Aaron Jones – 7 receptions, 75 yards
- DAL – Amari Cooper – 11 receptions, 226 yards, TD

In a highly anticipated matchup against Aaron Rodgers and the Green Bay Packers in a testament of the Cowboys-Packers rivalry, the Cowboys struggled mightily. Looking to defeat the Packers whom they have not beaten at home since 2007, the first drive resulted in an interception, which the Packers returned the interception for 37 yards without scoring. The Cowboys recovered from a 28 point deficit, but the Packers would prove excessive to overcome, and for the first time since the Divisional Round from 2018, they would allow 30+ points. This loss dropped the Cowboys to 3-2.

==== Week 6: at New York Jets ====
Week Six: Dallas Cowboys at New York Jets – Game summary

Quarter	1	2	3	4	Total
Cowboys	0	6	3	13	**22**
**Jets**	7	14	0	3	**24**

at MetLife Stadium, East Rutherford, New Jersey

- Date: October 13
- Game time: 4:25 p.m. EDT/3:25 p.m. CDT
- Game weather: Fair, 66 °F (19 °C)
- Game attendance: 78,523
- Referee: Brad Rogers
- TV announcers (CBS): Jim Nantz, Tony Romo and Tracy Wolfson
- Recap, Game Book

Game information

**First quarter**

- NYJ – Le'Veon Bell 2-yard run (Sam Ficken kick), 3:24. Jets 7–0. **Drive: 14 plays, 83 yards, 7:54.**

**Second quarter**

- DAL – Brett Maher 50-yard field goal, 14:56. Jets 7–3. **Drive: 8 plays, 43 yards, 3:28.**
- NYJ – Robby Anderson 92-yard pass from Sam Darnold (Sam Ficken kick), 3:34. Jets 14–3. **Drive: 1 play, 92 yards, 0:12.**
- NYJ – Ryan Griffin 5-yard pass from Sam Darnold (Sam Ficken kick), 0:27. Jets 21–3. **Drive: 6 plays, 65 yards, 1:33.**
- DAL – Brett Maher 62-yard field goal, 0:00. Jets 21–6. **Drive: 5 plays, 31 yards, 0:27.**

**Third quarter**

- DAL – Brett Maher 32-yard field goal, 7:50. Jets 21–9. **Drive: 14 plays, 61 yards, 7:10.**

**Fourth quarter**

- DAL – Ezekiel Elliott 5-yard run (Brett Maher kick), 6:30. Jets 21–16. **Drive: 11 plays, 84 yards, 4:51.**
- NYJ – Sam Ficken 38-yard field goal, 3:24. Jets 24–16. **Drive: 7 plays, 57 yards, 3:06.**
- DAL – Dak Prescott 4-yard run (pass failed), 0:43. Jets 24–22. **Drive: 10 plays, 75 yards, 2:41.**

**Top passers**

- DAL – Dak Prescott – 28/40, 277 yards
- NYJ – Sam Darnold – 23/32, 338 yards, 2 TD, INT

**Top rushers**

- DAL – Ezekiel Elliott – 28 rushes, 105 yards, TD
- NYJ – Le'Veon Bell – 14 rushes, 50 yards, TD

**Top receivers**

- DAL – Tavon Austin – 5 receptions, 64 yards
- NYJ – Robby Anderson – 5 receptions, 125 yards, TD

The Cowboys traveled to Metlife Stadium to take on Sam Darnold, who had just recovered from mono and the Jets in one of their two trips to East Rutherford, New Jersey. They looked to defeat the Jets, whom Dallas had not beaten since 2007.

The Jets would score a 92-yard touchdown in one of the worst defensive plays by the Cowboys. The Cowboys attempted to rally, but while attempting a two-point conversion that would tie the game and send it to overtime, the pass was incomplete. The loss dropped them to 3-3, and their streak of losing three games against the Jets continued.

==== Week 7: vs. Philadelphia Eagles ====
Week Seven: Philadelphia Eagles at Dallas Cowboys – Game summary

Quarter	1	2	3	4	Total
Eagles	7	0	3	0	**10**
**Cowboys**	14	13	0	10	**37**

at AT&T Stadium, Arlington, Texas

- Date: October 20
- Game time: 7:20 p.m. CDT
- Game weather: None (retractable roof closed)
- Game attendance: 91,213
- Referee: Jerome Boger
- TV announcers (NBC): Al Michaels, Cris Collinsworth and Michele Tafoya
- Recap, Game Book

Game information

**First quarter**

- DAL – Tavon Austin 20-yard run (Brett Maher kick), 10:08. Cowboys 7–0. **Drive: 6 plays, 45 yards, 3:02.**
- DAL – Ezekiel Elliott 1-yard run (Brett Maher kick), 8:56. Cowboys 14–0. **Drive: 2 plays, 14 yards, 0:18.**
- PHI – Dallas Goedert 28-yard pass from Carson Wentz (Jake Elliott kick), 4:38. Cowboys 14–7. **Drive: 7 plays, 87 yards, 4:18.**

**Second quarter**

- DAL – Blake Jarwin 1-yard pass from Dak Prescott (Brett Maher kick), 6:40. Cowboys 21–7. **Drive: 12 plays, 71 yards, 6:52.**
- DAL – Brett Maher 26-yard field goal, 1:31. Cowboys 24–7. **Drive: 8 plays, 72 yards, 1:16.**
- DAL – Brett Maher 63-yard field goal, 0:00. Cowboys 27–7. **Drive: 5 plays, 25 yards, 0:22.**

**Third quarter**

- PHI – Jake Elliott 38-yard field goal, 4:59. Cowboys 27–10. **Drive: 12 plays, 66 yards, 5:51.**

**Fourth quarter**

- DAL – Brett Maher 29-yard field goal, 12:36. Cowboys 30–10. **Drive: 13 plays, 64 yards, 7:23.**
- DAL – Dak Prescott 8-yard run (Brett Maher kick), 9:33. Cowboys 37–10. **Drive: 3 plays, 16 yards, 1:21.**

**Top passers**

- PHI – Carson Wentz – 16/26, 191 yards, TD, INT
- DAL – Dak Prescott – 21/27, 239 yards, TD, INT

**Top rushers**

- PHI – Jordan Howard – 11 rushes, 50 yards
- DAL – Ezekiel Elliott – 22 rushes, 111 yards, TD

**Top receivers**

- PHI – Dallas Goedert – 4 receptions, 69 yards, TD
- DAL – Amari Cooper – 5 receptions, 106 yards

The Cowboys dominated the entire game and returned to their winning ways. One of the first plays was a forced fumble on Carson Wentz, which Dallas recovered. Tavon Austin would give the Cowboys the first scoring drive shortly afterwards. Brett Maher kicked a 63-yard field goal to break his old record of 62, which was also during a game at home against the Eagles. The Cowboys would put their 3-game losing streak to an end as the Cowboys would improve to 4-3.

==== Week 9: at New York Giants ====
Week Nine: Dallas Cowboys at New York Giants – Game summary

Quarter	1	2	3	4	Total
**Cowboys**	3	10	3	21	**37**
Giants	3	9	3	3	**18**

at MetLife Stadium, East Rutherford, New Jersey

- Date: November 4
- Game time: 8:15 p.m. EST/7:15 p.m. CST
- Game weather: Fair, 51 °F (11 °C)
- Game attendance: 76,107
- Referee: Clay Martin
- TV announcers (ESPN): Joe Tessitore, Booger McFarland, Lisa Salters and John Parry
- Recap, Game Book

Game information

**First quarter**

- NYG - Aldrick Rosas 21-yard field goal, 13:23. Giants 3-0. **Drive: 4 plays, 5 yards, 1:26.**
- DAL - Brett Maher 35-yard field goal, 8:19. Tied 3-3. **Drive: 11 plays, 58 yards, 5:04.**

**Second quarter**

- NYG - Cody Latimer 1-yard pass from Daniel Jones (kick failed), 11:55. Giants 9-3. **Drive: 10 plays, 56 yards, 5:14.**
- NYG - Aldrick Rosas 25-yard field goal, 2:50. Giants 12-3. **Drive: 12 plays, 73 yards, 6:26.**
- DAL - Blake Jarwin 42-yard pass from Dak Prescott, (Brett Maher kick), 0:52. Giants 12-10. **Drive: 6 plays, 75 yards, 1:58.**
- DAL - Brett Maher 52-yard field goal, 0:00. Cowboys 13-12. **Drive: 4 plays, 5 yards, 0:25.**

**Third quarter**

- DAL - Brett Maher 28-yard field goal, 4:43. Cowboys 16-12. **Drive: 7 plays, 39 yards, 2:50.**
- NYG - Aldrick Rosas 26-yard field goal, 0:27. Cowboys 16-15. **Drive: 8 plays, 44 yards, 4:16.**

**Fourth quarter**

- DAL - Michael Gallup 15-yard pass from Dak Prescott (Brett Maher kick), 12:40. Cowboys 23-15. **Drive: 9 plays, 75 yards, 2:47.**
- NYG - Aldrick Rosas 29-yard field goal, 11:50. Cowboys 23-18. **Drive: 5 plays, 65 yards, 0:50.**
- DAL - Amari Cooper 45-yard pass from Dak Prescott (Brett Maher kick), 7:56. Cowboys 30-18. **Drive: 8 plays, 89 yards, 3:54.**
- DAL - Jourdan Lewis 63-yard fumble return (Brett Maher kick), 0:06. Cowboys 37-18.

**Top passers**

- DAL - Dak Prescott - 22/35, 257 yards, 3 TD, INT
- NYG - Daniel Jones - 26/41, 210 yards, TD, INT

**Top rushers**

- DAL - Ezekiel Elliott - 23 rushes, 139 yards
- NYG - Daniel Jones - 6 rushes, 54 yards

**Top receivers**

- DAL - Amari Cooper - 4 receptions, 80 yards, TD
- NYG - Saquon Barkley - 6 receptions, 67 yards

Despite a first pass attempt being an interception and the Giants having a lead by 9 points, the Cowboys dominated the rest of the game. Ezekiel Elliott made his first appearance at MetLife Stadium since his rookie season and would run for 139 yards on 23 carries. The game is famous for a black cat appearing during the game. This would delay the game for several minutes. The Jourdan Lewis fumble recovery sealed the game as it was returned for a touchdown while the Cowboys led 30-18 to put them up 37-18 and improve to 5-3 with the win.

==== Week 10: vs. Minnesota Vikings ====
Week Ten: Minnesota Vikings at Dallas Cowboys – Game summary

Quarter	1	2	3	4	Total
**Vikings**	14	3	11	0	**28**
Cowboys	0	14	7	3	**24**

at AT&T Stadium, Arlington, Texas

- Date: November 10
- Game time: 7:20 p.m. CST
- Game weather: Clear, 67 °F (19 °C) (retractable roof open)
- Game attendance: 91,188
- Referee: Shawn Hochuli
- TV announcers (NBC): Al Michaels, Cris Collinsworth, Michele Tafoya and Terry McAulay
- Recap, Game Book

Game information

**First quarter**

- MIN – Kyle Rudolph 1-yard pass from Kirk Cousins (Dan Bailey kick), 9:25. Vikings 7–0. **Drive: 5 plays, 53 yards, 2:38.**
- MIN – Kyle Rudolph 1-yard pass from Kirk Cousins (Dan Bailey kick), 0:32. Vikings 14–0. **Drive: 13 plays, 90 yards, 6:19.**

**Second quarter**

- DAL – Michael Gallup 23-yard pass from Dak Prescott (Brett Maher kick), 8:08. Vikings 14–7. **Drive: 5 plays, 48 yards, 2:32.**
- DAL – Randall Cobb 22-yard pass from Dak Prescott (Brett Maher kick), 1:54. Tied 14–14. **Drive: 11 plays, 83 yards, 4:39.**
- MIN – Dan Bailey 26-yard field goal, 0:00. Vikings 17–14. **Drive: 9 plays, 67 yards, 1:54.**

**Third quarter**

- MIN – Dan Bailey 27-yard field goal, 9:38. Vikings 20–14. **Drive: 12 plays, 66 yards, 5:22.**
- DAL – Amari Cooper 12-yard pass from Dak Prescott (Brett Maher kick), 7:01. Cowboys 21–20. **Drive: 7 plays, 75 yards, 2:37.**
- MIN – Dalvin Cook 2-yard run (Kirk Cousins–Kyle Rudolph pass), 0:02. Vikings 28–21. **Drive: 13 plays, 75 yards, 6:59.**

**Fourth quarter**

- DAL – Brett Maher 23-yard field goal, 10:00. Vikings 28–24. **Drive: 13 plays, 70 yards, 5:02.**

**Top passers**

- MIN – Kirk Cousins – 23/32, 220 yards, 2 TD
- DAL – Dak Prescott – 28/46, 397 yards, 3 TD, INT

**Top rushers**

- MIN – Dalvin Cook – 26 rushes, 97 yards, TD
- DAL – Ezekiel Elliott – 20 rushes, 47 yards

**Top receivers**

- MIN – Dalvin Cook – 7 receptions, 86 yards
- DAL – Amari Cooper – 11 receptions, 147 yards, TD

The contest was competitive the entire night. The Cowboys would start by falling behind after two touchdowns were scored by the Vikings. Later, the Cowboys fought back and grabbed the lead late. This wouldn't last long as the Vikings ran away with another touchdown scoring drive. The Cowboys responded with a field goal to make it 28–24. Luck ran out after Dak Prescott's Hail Mary pass was intercepted in the fading seconds, sealing the Cowboys' loss. This loss dropped the Cowboys to 5-4.

==== Week 11: at Detroit Lions ====
Week Eleven: Dallas Cowboys at Detroit Lions – Game summary

Quarter	1	2	3	4	Total
**Cowboys**	3	21	3	8	**35**
Lions	7	7	7	6	**27**

at Ford Field, Detroit, Michigan

- Date: November 17
- Game time: 1:00 p.m. EST/12:00 p.m. CST
- Game weather: None (indoor stadium)
- Game attendance: 61,801
- Referee: Tony Corrente
- TV announcers (Fox): Kevin Burkhardt, Charles Davis and Pam Oliver
- Recap Game Book

Game information

**First quarter**

- DET – Bo Scarbrough 5-yard run (Matt Prater kick), 12:33. Lions 7–0. **Drive: 5 plays, 28 yards, 2:16.**
- DAL – Brett Maher 30-yard field goal, 2:18. Lions 7–3. **Drive: 14 plays, 74 yards, 7:31.**

**Second quarter**

- DAL – Tony Pollard 21-yard pass from Dak Prescott (Brett Maher kick), 14:10. Cowboys 10–7. **Drive: 7 plays, 70 yards, 2:11.**
- DET – Jeff Driskel 2-yard run (Matt Prater kick), 7:46. Lions 14–10. **Drive: 6 plays, 45 yards, 3:17.**
- DAL – Ezekiel Elliott 1-yard run (Brett Maher kick), 4:37. Cowboys 17–14. **Drive: 7 plays, 75 yards, 3:09.**
- DAL – Randall Cobb 19-yard pass from Dak Prescott (Brett Maher kick), 0:27. Cowboys 24–14. **Drive: 4 plays, 83 yards, 1:21.**

**Third quarter**

- DET – Marvin Jones 11-yard pass from Jeff Driskel (Matt Prater kick), 9:15. Cowboys 24–21. **Drive: 10 plays, 75 yards, 5:45.**
- DAL – Brett Maher 34-yard field goal, 5:00. Cowboys 27–21. **Drive: 10 plays, 59 yards, 4:15.**

**Fourth quarter**

- DAL – Ezekiel Elliott 17-yard pass from Dak Prescott (Tony Pollard run), 7:56. Cowboys 35–21. **Drive: 11 plays, 84 yards, 5:41.**
- DET – Marvin Jones 25-yard pass from Jeff Driskel (pass failed), 5:49. Cowboys 35–27. **Drive: 5 plays, 75 yards, 2:07.**

**Top passers**

- DAL – Dak Prescott – 29/46, 444 yards, 3 TD
- DET – Jeff Driskel – 15/26, 209 yards, 2 TD

**Top rushers**

- DAL – Ezekiel Elliott – 16 rushes, 45 yards, TD
- DET – Bo Scarbrough – 14 rushes, 55 yards, TD

**Top receivers**

- DAL – Michael Gallup – 9 receptions, 148 yards
- DET – Danny Amendola – 4 receptions, 47 yards

On the first handoff to Ezekiel Elliott, the fumble was recovered by the Lions, that way the Lions could score and take a 7-0 lead. The Cowboys would respond with a field goal by Brett Maher. Later on, the Cowboys would claim the lead and would not allow the Lions to lead again after Cowboys scored another touchdown. The game's biggest highlight was a catch by Michael Gallup, who would scoop the ball up after nearly dropping a pass. This win would improve them to 6-4.

Elliott's touchdown celebration of the “Dak Dance” became a meme and a trend for the rest of the 2019 NFL season.

==== Week 12: at New England Patriots ====
Week Twelve: Dallas Cowboys at New England Patriots – Game summary

Quarter	1	2	3	4	Total
Cowboys	0	6	0	3	**9**
**Patriots**	7	3	0	3	**13**

at Gillette Stadium, Foxborough, Massachusetts

- Date: November 24
- Game time: 3:25 p.m. CST/4:25 p.m. EST
- Game weather: Rain and wind, 38 °F (3 °C)
- Game attendance: 65,878
- Referee: Scott Novak
- TV announcers (Fox): Joe Buck, Troy Aikman and Erin Andrews
- Recap, Game Book

Game information

**First quarter**

- NE – N'Keal Harry 10-yard pass from Tom Brady (Nick Folk kick), 0:45. Patriots 7–0. **Drive: 2 plays, 12 yards, 0:43.**

**Second quarter**

- NE – Nick Folk 44-yard field goal, 12:46. Patriots 10–0. **Drive: 4 plays, 3 yards, 1:31.**
- DAL – Brett Maher 46-yard field goal, 8:36. Patriots 10-3. **Drive: 9 plays, 42 yards, 4:10.**
- DAL – Brett Maher 27-yard field goal, 2:28. Patriots 10-6. **Drive: 9 plays, 55 yards, 4:18.**

**Third quarter**

- No scoring plays.

**Fourth quarter**

- NE – Nick Folk 42-yard field goal, 9:32. Patriots 13-6. **Drive: 12 plays, 38 yards, 6:02.**
- DAL – Brett Maher 29-yard field goal, 6:04. Patriots 13-9. **Drive: 8 plays, 78 yards, 3:28.**

**Top passers**

- DAL – Dak Prescott – 19/33, 212 yards, INT
- NE – Tom Brady – 17/37, 190 yards, TD

**Top rushers**

- DAL – Ezekiel Elliott – 21 rushes, 86 yards
- NE – Sony Michel – 20 rushes, 85 yards

**Top receivers**

- DAL – Randall Cobb – 4 receptions, 86 yards
- NE – Julian Edelman – 8 receptions, 93 yards

The Cowboys were held to three field goals the entire game. One of the lowlights included a blocked Chris Jones punt. The Patriots would score a touchdown the next drive. Despite a strong showing from the defense, the Cowboys would never lead. The Cowboys dropped to 6–5.

==== Week 13: vs. Buffalo Bills ====
Thanksgiving Day Games

Week Thirteen: Buffalo Bills at Dallas Cowboys – Game summary

Quarter	1	2	3	4	Total
**Bills**	0	13	10	3	**26**
Cowboys	7	0	0	8	**15**

at AT&T Stadium, Arlington, Texas

- Date: November 28
- Game time: 3:30 p.m. CST
- Game weather: None (retractable roof closed)
- Game attendance: 90,445
- Referee: Bill Vinovich
- TV announcers (CBS): Jim Nantz, Tony Romo and Tracy Wolfson
- Recap, Game Book

Game information

**First quarter**

- DAL – Jason Witten 8-yard pass from Dak Prescott (Brett Maher kick), 10:34. Cowboys 7–0. **Drive: 9 plays, 75 yards, 4:26**

**Second quarter**

- BUF – Cole Beasley 25-yard pass from Josh Allen (Stephen Hauschka kick), 8:01. Tied 7–7. **Drive: 8 plays, 85 yards, 4:26.**
- BUF – Devin Singletary 28-yard pass from John Brown (kick failed, wide right), 1:52. Bills 13–7. **Drive: 5 plays, 39 yards, 1:28.**

**Third quarter**

- BUF – Stephen Hauschka 41-yard field goal, 10:47. Bills 16–7. **Drive: 8 plays, 48 yards, 4:13.**
- BUF – Josh Allen 15-yard run (Stephen Hauschka kick), 3:37. Bills 23–7. **Drive: 7 plays, 63 yards, 4:00.**

**Fourth quarter**

- BUF – Stephen Hauschka 26-yard field goal, 8:20. Bills 26–7. **Drive: 13 plays, 86 yards, 7:02.**
- DAL – Ventell Bryant 15-yard pass from Dak Prescott (Dak Prescott pass to Jason Witten), 4:01. Bills 26–15. **Drive: 5 plays, 70 yards, 1:27.**

**Top passers**

- BUF – Josh Allen – 19/24, 231 yards, TD
- DAL – Dak Prescott – 32/49, 355 yards, 2 TD, INT

**Top rushers**

- BUF – Devin Singletary – 14 rushes, 63 yards
- DAL – Ezekiel Elliott – 12 rushes, 71 yards

**Top receivers**

- BUF – Cole Beasley – 6 receptions, 110 yards, TD
- DAL – Amari Cooper – 8 receptions, 85 yards

Coming off a close loss at New England, the Cowboys returned home to take on the Bills. The Cowboys would score first when Dak Prescott threw a touchdown pass to Jason Witten. The Bills proceeded to score 26 straight points before giving up a touchdown with 4:01 left in the fourth quarter with the final score 26-15. This loss also ensures they would no longer exceed the win mark from the previous season.

==== Week 14: at Chicago Bears ====
Week Fourteen: Dallas Cowboys at Chicago Bears – Game summary

Quarter	1	2	3	4	Total
Cowboys	7	0	0	17	**24**
**Bears**	0	17	7	7	**31**

at Soldier Field, Chicago, Illinois

- Date: December 5
- Game time: 7:20 p.m. CST
- Game weather: Mostly cloudy, 44 °F (7 °C)
- Game attendance: 61,276
- Referee: Brad Rogers
- TV announcers (Fox/NFLN/Amazon Prime): Joe Buck, Troy Aikman, Erin Andrews and Kristina Pink
- Recap, Game Book

Game information

**First quarter**

- DAL – Ezekiel Elliott 2-yard run (Brett Maher kick), 6:03. Cowboys 7–0. **Drive: 17 plays, 75 yards, 8:57.**

**Second quarter**

- CHI – Allen Robinson 5-yard pass from Mitchell Trubisky (Eddy Piñeiro kick), 12:13. Tied 7–7. **Drive: 6 plays, 51 yards, 3:04.**
- CHI – Eddy Piñeiro 36-yard field goal, 8:06. Bears 10–7. **Drive: 7 plays, 36 yards, 3:09.**
- CHI – Allen Robinson 8-yard pass from Mitchell Trubisky (Eddy Piñeiro kick), 0:10. Bears 17–7. **Drive: 14 plays, 68 yards, 4:50.**

**Third quarter**

- CHI – Anthony Miller 14-yard pass from Mitchell Trubisky (Eddy Piñeiro kick), 3:18. Bears 24–7. **Drive: 11 plays, 84 yards, 6:42.**

**Fourth quarter**

- DAL – Ezekiel Elliott 2-yard run (Brett Maher kick), 14:55. Bears 24–14. **Drive: 9 plays, 54 yards, 3:03.**
- CHI – Mitchell Trubisky 23-yard run (Eddy Piñeiro kick), 13:22. Bears 31–14. **Drive: 3 plays, 60 yards, 1:33.**
- DAL – Amari Cooper 19-yard pass from Dak Prescott (Brett Maher kick), 4:29. Bears 31–21. **Drive: 10 plays, 85 yards, 3:14.**
- DAL – Brett Maher 31-yard field goal, 0:08. Bears 31–24. **Drive: 9 plays, 77 yards, 1:42.**

**Top passers**

- DAL – Dak Prescott – 27/49, 334 yards, TD
- CHI – Mitchell Trubisky – 23/31, 244 yards, 3 TD, INT

**Top rushers**

- DAL – Ezekiel Elliott – 19 rushes, 81 yards, 2 TD
- CHI – David Montgomery – 20 rushes, 86 yards

**Top receivers**

- DAL – Michael Gallup – 6 receptions, 109 yards
- CHI – Tarik Cohen – 6 receptions, 24 yards

The game would begin with the Cowboys scoring first but they would struggle the remainder of the game. Mitchell Trubisky lead the Bears to a 31-14 lead. The Cowboys would later fight back but fell short. This loss dropped them to 6-7 and below .500 for the first time this season. Also with the loss, they would no longer be able to tie their 10-6 record from the previous season.

==== Week 15: vs. Los Angeles Rams ====
Week Fifteen: Los Angeles Rams at Dallas Cowboys – Game summary

Quarter	1	2	3	4	Total
Rams	0	7	0	14	**21**
**Cowboys**	7	21	3	13	**44**

at AT&T Stadium, Arlington, Texas

- Date: December 15
- Game time: 3:25 p.m. CST
- Game weather: None (retractable roof closed)
- Game attendance: 90,436
- Referee: Walt Anderson
- TV announcers (Fox): Joe Buck, Troy Aikman and Erin Andrews
- Recap, Game Book

Game information

**First quarter**

- DAL - Jason Witten 19-yard pass from Dak Prescott (Kai Forbath kick), 1:47. Cowboys 7-0. **Drive: 15 plays, 90 yards, 6:21.**

**Second quarter**

- LAR - Todd Gurley 2-yard pass from Jared Goff (Greg Zuerlein kick), 12:58. Tied 7-7. **Drive: 9 plays, 75 yards, 3:49.**
- DAL - Tavon Austin 59-yard pass from Dak Prescott (Kai Forbath kick), 11:37. Cowboys 14-7. **Drive: 3 plays, 75 yards, 1:21.**
- DAL - Ezekiel Elliott 1-yard run (Kai Forbath kick), 1:57. Cowboys 21-7. **Drive: 14 plays, 97 yards, 7:57.**
- DAL - Ezekiel Elliott 3-yard run (Kai Forbath kick), 0:16. Cowboys 28-7. **Drive: 3 plays, 9 yards, 1:00.**

**Third quarter**

- DAL - Kai Forbath 50-yard field goal, 11:09. Cowboys 31-7. **Drive: 8 plays, 43 yards, 3:51.**

**Fourth quarter**

- DAL - Kai Forbath 42-yard field goal, 14:56. Cowboys 34-7. **Drive: 7 plays, 40 yards, 3:49.**
- DAL - Kai Forbath 42-yard field goal, 6:40. Cowboys 37-7. **Drive: 10 plays, 57 yards, 6:59.**
- LAR - Todd Gurley 7-yard run (Todd Gurley run), 3:17. Cowboys 37-15. **Drive: 12 plays, 75 yards, 3:23.**
- DAL - Tony Pollard 44-yard run (Kai Forbath kick), 3:00. Cowboys 44-15. **Drive: 2 plays, 46 yards, 0:17.**
- LAR - Cooper Kupp 7-yard pass from Jared Goff (pass failed), 0:40. Cowboys 44-21. **Drive: 11 plays, 60 yards, 2:20.**

**Top passers**

- LAR - Jared Goff - 33/51, 284 yards, 2 TD, INT
- DAL - Dak Prescott - 15/23, 212 yards, 2 TD

**Top rushers**

- LAR - Todd Gurley - 11 rushes, 20 yards, TD
- DAL - Tony Pollard - 12 rushes, 131 yards, TD

**Top receivers**

- LAR - Tyler Higbee - 12 receptions, 111 yards
- DAL - Tavon Austin - 1 reception, 59 yards, TD

Before the game started, there was an error on a coin toss, which the officials misunderstood, which Dak Prescott actually said "kick" when he intended to say "defer". The Cowboys afterwards dominated and led the entire game. It was the first time since the Week 13 in 2018 that the Cowboys would defeat a team sitting with a minimum of .500 percentage of wins. The win by the Cowboys also improved them to 7-7.

==== Week 16: at Philadelphia Eagles ====
Week Sixteen: Dallas Cowboys at Philadelphia Eagles – Game summary

Quarter	1	2	3	4	Total
Cowboys	0	6	0	3	**9**
**Eagles**	10	0	7	0	**17**

at Lincoln Financial Field, Philadelphia, Pennsylvania

- Date: December 22
- Game time: 3:25 p.m. CST/4:25 p.m. EST
- Game weather: Clear, 47 °F (8 °C)
- Game attendance: 69,796
- Referee: Tony Corrente
- TV announcers (Fox): Joe Buck, Troy Aikman and Erin Andrews
- Recap, Game Book

Game information

**First quarter**

- PHI – Jake Elliott 36-yard field goal, 9:32. Eagles 3–0. **Drive: 11 plays, 57 yards, 5:28.**
- PHI – Dallas Goedert 6-yard pass from Carson Wentz (Jake Elliott kick), 4:03. Eagles 10–0. **Drive: 7 plays, 63 yards, 3:50.**

**Second quarter**

- DAL – Kai Forbath 49-yard field goal, 12:56. Eagles 10–3. **Drive: 7 plays, 48 yards, 2:20.**
- DAL – Kai Forbath 32-yard field goal, 0:03. Eagles 10–6. **Drive: 5 plays, 43 yards, 0:26.**

**Third quarter**

- PHI – Miles Sanders 1-yard run (Jake Elliott kick), 0:06. Eagles 17–6. **Drive: 10 plays, 80 yards, 4:39.**

**Fourth quarter**

- DAL – Kai Forbath 49-yard field goal, 7:59. Eagles 17–9. **Drive: 8 plays, 24 yards, 2:59.**

**Top passers**

- DAL – Dak Prescott – 25/44, 265 yards
- PHI – Carson Wentz – 31/40, 319 yards, TD

**Top rushers**

- DAL – Ezekiel Elliott – 13 rushes, 47 yards
- PHI – Miles Sanders – 20 rushes, 79 yards, TD

**Top receivers**

- DAL – Ezekiel Elliott – 7 receptions, 37 yards
- PHI – Dallas Goedert – 9 receptions, 91 yards, TD

The Cowboys were denied a chance to become the first NFC East team to repeat as division champions since the Eagles did so between 2001 and 2004.

The game began with the Eagles converting two third-downs and converting a 36-yard field goal. The Cowboys would allow the Eagles' offense to march down the field 63 yards over 7 plays. Dallas Goedert caught a 6-yard pass from Wentz to increase the Eagles' lead. The Cowboys drove to the Eagles' 23-yard line when they were trailing 17-9, in which the Cowboys attempted to tie the game. A pass to Michael Gallup was incomplete on a fourth down play, giving the ball back to the Eagles to run out the game clock. This loss dropped the Cowboys to 7-8.

==== Week 17: vs. Washington Redskins ====
Week Seventeen: Washington Redskins at Dallas Cowboys – Game summary

Quarter	1	2	3	4	Total
Redskins	0	10	6	0	**16**
**Cowboys**	6	14	17	10	**47**

at AT&T Stadium, Arlington, Texas

- Date: December 29
- Game time: 3:25 p.m. CST
- Game weather: None (retractable roof closed)
- Game attendance: 90,646
- Referee: Craig Wrolstad
- TV announcers (Fox): Joe Buck, Troy Aikman and Erin Andrews
- Recap, Game Book

Game information

**First quarter**

- DAL – Kai Forbath 28-yard field goal, 7:41. Cowboys 3-0. **Drive: 10 plays, 26 yards, 4:54.**
- DAL – Kai Forbath 47-yard field goal, 5:15. Cowboys 6-0. **Drive: 4 plays, −8 yards, 1:28.**

**Second quarter**

- WAS – Dustin Hopkins 31-yard field goal, 13:37. Cowboys 6–3. **Drive: 4 plays, 3 yards, 0:57.**
- DAL – Ezekiel Elliott 13-yard pass from Dak Prescott (Kai Forbath kick), 11:01. Cowboys 13–3. **Drive: 7 plays, 75 yards, 2:36.**
- DAL – Ezekiel Elliott 33-yard run (Kai Forbath kick), 3:50. Cowboys 20–3. **Drive: 6 plays, 61 yards, 2:44.**
- WAS – Steven Sims 6-yard pass from Case Keenum (Dustin Hopkins kick), 0:34. Cowboys 20–10. **Drive: 10 plays, 74 yards, 3:16.**

**Third quarter**

- WAS – Dustin Hopkins 42-yard field goal, 11:54. Cowboys 20–13. **Drive: 6 plays, 58 yards, 3:06.**
- DAL – Michael Gallup 4-yard pass from Dak Prescott (Kai Forbath kick), 8:17. Cowboys 27–13. **Drive: 7 plays, 75 yards, 3:37.**
- WAS – Dustin Hopkins 28-yard field goal, 7:00. Cowboys 27–16. **Drive: 5 plays, 65 yards, 1:17.**
- DAL – Kai Forbath 48-yard field goal, 4:07. Cowboys 30–16. **Drive: 7 plays, 43 yards, 2:53.**
- DAL – Michael Gallup 32-yard pass from Dak Prescott (Kai Forbath kick), 0:52. Cowboys 37–16. **Drive: 4 plays, 53 yards, 2:00.**

**Fourth quarter**

- DAL – Michael Gallup 45-yard pass from Dak Prescott (Kai Forbath kick), 12:46. Cowboys 44–16. **Drive: 3 plays, 49 yards, 0:51.**
- DAL – Kai Forbath 40-yard field goal, 2:40. Cowboys 47–16. **Drive: 15 plays, 72 yards, 8:22.**

**Top passers**

- WAS – Case Keenum – 18/37, 206 yards, TD, INT
- DAL – Dak Prescott – 23/33, 303 yards, 4 TD

**Top rushers**

- WAS – Adrian Peterson – 13 rushes, 78 yards
- DAL – Ezekiel Elliott – 18 rushes, 122 yards, TD

**Top receivers**

- WAS – Steven Sims – 5 receptions, 81 yards, TD
- DAL – Michael Gallup – 5 receptions, 98 yards, 3 TD

Kai Forbath remained perfect in field goals as he converted each attempt for the third consecutive game. Jaylon Smith obtained his first interception in his career off quarterback Case Keenum, who started as emergency for Dwayne Haskins Jr. who injured his ankle the previous week. This would be the final game with head coach Jason Garrett as his contract expired and was not renewed. Despite the dominant win, the Cowboys' season ended after the Eagles defeated the Giants. The Cowboys had needed the Eagles to lose to the Giants so they could clinch the NFC East and make the playoffs in back-to-back seasons.

=== Standings ===
==== Division ====
NFC East
	W	L	T	PCT	DIV	CONF	PF	PA	STK
^{(4)} Philadelphia Eagles	9	7	0	.563	5–1	7–5	385	354	W4
Dallas Cowboys	8	8	0	.500	5–1	7–5	434	321	W1
New York Giants	4	12	0	.250	2–4	3–9	341	451	L1
Washington Redskins	3	13	0	.188	0–6	2–10	266	435	L4

==== Conference ====
NFC
#	Team	Division	W	L	T	PCT	DIV	CONF	SOS	SOV	STK
**Division leaders**
1 (Note: San Francisco finished ahead of Green Bay and New Orleans based on head-to-head sweep, claiming the No. 1 seed.)	San Francisco 49ers	West	13	3	0	.813	5–1	10–2	.504	.466	W2
2 (Note: Green Bay claimed the No. 2 seed over New Orleans based on conference record.)	Green Bay Packers	North	13	3	0	.813	6–0	10–2	.453	.428	W5
3	New Orleans Saints	South	13	3	0	.813	5–1	9–3	.486	.459	W3
4	Philadelphia Eagles	East	9	7	0	.563	5–1	7–5	.455	.417	W4
**Wild Cards**
5	Seattle Seahawks	West	11	5	0	.688	3–3	8–4	.531	.463	L2
6	Minnesota Vikings	North	10	6	0	.625	2–4	7–5	.477	.356	L2
**Did not qualify for the postseason**
7	Los Angeles Rams	West	9	7	0	.563	3–3	7–5	.535	.438	W1
8 (Note: Chicago finished ahead of Dallas based on head-to-head victory.)	Chicago Bears	North	8	8	0	.500	4–2	7–5	.508	.383	W1
9	Dallas Cowboys	East	8	8	0	.500	5–1	7–5	.479	.316	W1
10 (Note: Atlanta finished ahead of Tampa Bay based on division record.)	Atlanta Falcons	South	7	9	0	.438	4–2	6–6	.545	.518	W4
11	Tampa Bay Buccaneers	South	7	9	0	.438	2–4	5–7	.500	.384	L2
12	Arizona Cardinals	West	5	10	1	.344	1–5	3–8–1	.529	.375	L1
13	Carolina Panthers	South	5	11	0	.313	1–5	2–10	.549	.469	L8
14	New York Giants	East	4	12	0	.250	2–4	3–9	.473	.281	L1
15	Detroit Lions	North	3	12	1	.219	0–6	2–9–1	.506	.375	L9
16	Washington Redskins	East	3	13	0	.188	0–6	2–10	.502	.281	L4
**Tiebreakers** (Note: When breaking ties for three or more teams under the NFL's rules, they are first broken within divisions, then comparing only the highest-ranked remaining team from each division.)
