= Ventell Bryant =

American football player (born 1996)

No. 83
- Position: Wide receiver

Personal information
- Born: August 24, 1996 (age 30); Tampa, Florida, U.S.
- Listed height: 6 ft 3 in (1.91 m)
- Listed weight: 205 lb (93 kg)

Career information
- High school: Thomas Jefferson (Tampa)
- College: Temple
- NFL draft: 2019: undrafted

Career history
- Cincinnati Bengals (2019)*; Dallas Cowboys (2019–2020); Carolina Panthers (2020–2021)*
- * Offseason or practice squad member only

Career NFL statistics
- Receptions: 1
- Receiving yards: 15
- Receiving touchdowns: 1
- Stats at Pro Football Reference

Ventell Jamal Bryant (born August 24, 1996) is an American former professional football player who was a wide receiver in the National Football League (NFL). He played college football for the Temple Owls.

== Early life ==
Bryant was born to Luz Lebron and Oscar Bryant. He attended Thomas Jefferson High School. As a junior, he had six receptions for 62 yards.

As a senior, he contributed to the team having a 10–2 record and reaching the FHSAA 6A playoffs. He registered 34 receptions for 756 yards (20.7-yard avg.) and 11 touchdowns, while receiving All-Western Conference honors.

== College career ==
Bryant accepted a football scholarship from Temple University. As a redshirt freshman, he became a starter at wide receiver in the third game against the University of Massachusetts Amherst. He set school records for freshman receptions (39) and receiving yards (579). He was the team's second leading receiver behind Robby Anderson and also had 3 touchdowns.

As a sophomore, he led the team with 54 receptions for 895 yards. He was second on the team with 4 receiving touchdowns. He also contributed to the team winning the American Athletic Conference title. He had 5 receptions for 94 yards against the University of Central Florida. He made 5 receptions for 115 yards against the University of South Florida. He had 9 receptions for 168 yards and one touchdown against Tulane University. He made 11 receptions for 151 yards against Wake Forest University in the 2016 Military Bowl.

As a junior, he was fourth on the team with 29 receptions for 280 yards and no touchdowns. He had 7 receptions for 79 yards against Villanova University.

As a senior, he led the team with 51 receptions for 690 yards. He was third on the team with 3 touchdowns. He had 7 receptions for 109 yards and 2 touchdowns against the University of Central Florida.

He finished his college career as the school's all-time leading receiver with 173 receptions for 2,444 yards. He had 10 career receiving touchdowns.

== Professional career ==
=== Cincinnati Bengals ===
After not being selected in the 2019 NFL draft, he received a tryout invitation for the Cincinnati Bengals rookie-minicamp, where he performed well enough to be signed as an undrafted free agent on May 11. He was waived on August 31, 2019.

=== Dallas Cowboys ===
On September 2, 2019, Bryant was signed to the Dallas Cowboys' practice squad. On October 2, he was promoted to the active roster to replace injured core special teams player Kavon Frazier. The coaching staff would choose to activate him over fellow wide receiver Devin Smith in the last 12 games of the season, because of his special teams production. He recorded his first two career tackles in Week 7 against the Philadelphia Eagles. On Thanksgiving Day, Bryant caught his first career pass for a 15-yard touchdown from quarterback Dak Prescott. He appeared in 12 games and had 6 special teams tackles (tied for fourth on the team).

On September 7, 2020, Bryant was placed on injured reserve. He was designated to return from injured reserve on October 7, and began practicing with the team again. He was waived from injured reserve with an injury settlement on October 20. He was replaced with wide receiver Malik Turner.

=== Carolina Panthers ===
Bryant was signed to the Carolina Panthers' practice squad on December 14, 2020. He signed a reserve/future contract with the Panthers on January 4, 2021. On June 30, Bryant was suspended for the first two games of the 2021 NFL season for violating the league's substance abuse policy. He was waived on August 5.

== Personal life ==
On March 11, 2020, Bryant was arrested on a misdemeanor DUI charge in Tampa Bay, Florida.
