= Joe Jackson (defensive end) =

American football player (born 1996)

No. 56, 91
- Position: Defensive end

Personal information
- Born: December 20, 1996 (age 29); Homestead, Florida, U.S.
- Listed height: 6 ft 5 in (1.96 m)
- Listed weight: 251 lb (114 kg)

Career information
- High school: Gulliver Prep (Miami, Florida)
- College: Miami (FL) (2016–2018)
- NFL draft: 2019: 5th round, 165th overall pick

Career history
- Dallas Cowboys (2019); Cleveland Browns (2020–2021); Kansas City Chiefs (2021)*; Carolina Panthers (2022)*; Birmingham Stallions (2023); Edmonton Elks (2024)
- * Offseason or practice squad member only

Awards and highlights
- USFL champion (2023)

Career NFL statistics
- Total tackles: 25
- Sacks: 1.5
- Pass deflections: 1
- Fumble recoveries: 1
- Stats at Pro Football Reference

Joe Jackson (born December 20, 1996) is an American former professional football player who was a defensive end in the National Football League (NFL) and Canadian Football League (CFL). He played college football for the Miami Hurricanes.

== Early life ==
Jackson attended Gulliver Prep, where he was a two-way starter at defensive end and tight end. As a junior, he totaled 59 tackles and 4 sacks. As a senior, he tallied 46 tackles, 6 sacks and 4 forced fumbles. He was named the 2015 Class 5A-1A Male Athlete of the Year by the Miami Herald.

He finished his high school career with 178 tackles, 19 sacks and 8 forced fumbles. He also practiced basketball and track.

== College career ==
Jackson was a 4-star recruit and accepted a football scholarship from the University of Miami over Clemson, Alabama and Florida State on May 26, 2016.

As a true freshman, he played in all 13 games (2 starts), finishing with 32 total tackles, 11.5 for loss (led the team), 8.5 sacks (led the team), 2 forced fumbles and 2 fumble recoveries, including a touchdown.

As a sophomore, he appeared in 13 games with 12 starts at right defensive end, registering 59 tackles (11.5 tackles for loss), 6.5 sacks, 2 pass breakups and one forced fumble. He had 8 tackles (1.5 for loss) against the University of North Carolina.

As a junior, he started 12 out of 13 games at right defensive end, posting 47 tackles, 14.5 tackles for loss (third on the team), 9 sacks (led the team), 9 quarterback hurries (led the team), 2 pass breakups and one interception returned for a touchdown. He had 4 tackles, 2 sacks and 2.5 tackles for loss against Florida State University.

On January 3, 2019, he announced that he would forgo his final year of eligibility and declare for the 2019 NFL draft.

== Professional career ==
=== Dallas Cowboys ===
Jackson was selected by the Dallas Cowboys in the fifth round (165th overall) of the 2019 NFL Draft. As a rookie, he appeared in 5 games as a backup defensive end and was declared inactive in 11 contests (including the last 9). His participation decreased after Robert Quinn was reinstated from suspension on September 16. He played only 72 defensive snaps, most of them (26) coming in the season opener against the New York Giants. He totaled 5 tackles, 2 quarterback pressures and one pass defensed.

In 2020, the team brought in new talent at the defensive end position (Aldon Smith, Everson Griffen, Bradlee Anae, Randy Gregory) and he was waived on September 4.

=== Cleveland Browns ===
On September 6, 2020, he was claimed off waivers by the Cleveland Browns. He was active but did not play in the fifth game against the Indianapolis Colts. On November 24, he was placed on the reserve/COVID-19 list and was later activated on December 4, after being quarantined for being in close contact with an infected person. He appeared in 3 games as a reserve player and was declared inactive in 11 contests, while making 5 tackles.

Jackson was waived by the Browns on August 31, 2021. The Browns re-signed Jackson to their active roster on September 1, 2021. He was waived on October 8, 2021, and re-signed to the Browns' practice squad, along with being elevated to the active roster for the Browns' October 10, 2021 game, on October 9, 2021. Jackson reverted to the Browns' practice squad on October 11, 2021. Jackson was re-signed to the Browns' active roster on October 12, 2021. He was waived on November 27 and re-signed to the practice squad. Jackson was elevated to the Browns' active roster as a COVID-19 replacement player on December 24, 2021.

=== Kansas City Chiefs ===
On January 20, 2022, Jackson was signed to the Kansas City Chiefs practice squad.

=== Carolina Panthers ===
On February 17, 2022, Jackson signed a reserve/future contract with the Carolina Panthers. He was waived on May 24.

=== Birmingham Stallions ===
On March 14, 2023, Jackson signed with the Birmingham Stallions of the United States Football League (USFL). He was placed on the team's suspended list on June 8, 2023. He appeared in one game, making 3 tackles and one sack. He was not part of the roster after the 2024 UFL dispersal draft on January 15, 2024.

=== Edmonton Elks ===
Jackson signed with the Edmonton Elks on February 1, 2024. He was placed on the one-game on injured list on June 7. He was released on June 16, 2024.

== Career statistics ==
=== NFL ===
Year	Team	Games		Tackles					Interceptions						Fumbles			
Year	Team	GP	GS	Comb	Solo	Ast	Sack	TFL	Int	Yards	Avg	Lng	TD	PD	FF	FR	Yards	TD
2019	DAL	5	0	4	2	2	0.0	0	0	0	0.0	0	0	1	0	0	0	0
2020	CLE	3	0	5	2	3	0.0	0	0	0	0.0	0	0	0	0	1	0	0
Career		8	0	9	4	5	0.0	0	0	0	0.0	0	0	1	0	1	0	0

=== College ===
			Defense					
Year	Team	GP	Tackles	For Loss	Sacks	Int	FF	FR
2016	Miami (FL)	12	32	10.5	7.5	0	1	2
2017	Miami (FL)	11	50	10.5	6.5	0	1	0
2018	Miami (FL)	12	47	14.5	9.0	1	2	0
Totals		35	129	35.5	23.0	1	4	2
