= Brandon Knight (American football) =

American football player (born 1997)

No. 69
- Position: Offensive tackle

Personal information
- Born: April 1, 1997 (age 29); Noblesville, Indiana, U.S.
- Listed height: 6 ft 4 in (1.93 m)
- Listed weight: 315 lb (143 kg)

Career information
- High school: Noblesville
- College: Indiana
- NFL draft: 2019: undrafted

Career history
- Dallas Cowboys (2019–2021); Baltimore Ravens (2021)

Career NFL statistics
- Games played: 21
- Games started: 10
- Stats at Pro Football Reference

Brandon Knight (born April 1, 1997) is an American former professional football player who was an offensive tackle in the National Football League (NFL). He was signed by the Dallas Cowboys as an undrafted free agent in 2019. He played college football for the Indiana Hoosiers.

== Early life ==
Knight attended Noblesville High School in Noblesville, Indiana. He was a two-time All-conference selection. As a senior, he received Associated Press Class 6A All-state honors. He originally committed to Purdue University to play college football, but changed his commitment to Indiana University.

College recruiting
Name	Hometown	School	Height	Weight	Commit date
Brandon Knight; OT	Noblesville, Indiana	Noblesville High School	6 ft 5 in (1.96 m)	265 lb (120 kg)	Jun 22, 2014
Brandon Knight; OT	Recruit ratings: Rivals: 247Sports: ESPN:				
Overall recruit ranking: Rivals: 54 (OT) 247Sports: 71 (OT) ESPN: 82 (OT)
Note: In many cases, Scout, Rivals, 247Sports, On3, and ESPN may conflict in their listings of height and weight.; In these cases, the average was taken. ESPN grades are on a 100-point scale.; Sources: "Indiana Football Commitment List". Rivals.; "2015 Player Commits". ESPN.; "2015 Team Ranking". Rivals.com.

== College career ==
As a freshman, he appeared in 11 games, playing as an offensive tackle or tight end. He had his lone reception, a 22-yard touchdown, in the 54–36 win against Purdue University, which sealed a bowl berth. He was named honorable-mention BTN.com All-Freshman.

As a sophomore, he appeared in the first 8 games, starting six at right tackle after fifth-year senior Dimitric Camiel had back surgery. He suffered a season-ending left leg injury against the University of Maryland.

As a junior, an unspecified injury kept him out of the early season games, but was able to return to play in the final 10 contests with 8 starts at right tackle.

As a senior, he started all 12 games at right tackle, allowing three sacks in 904 snaps. He received honorable-mention All-Big Ten honors at the end of the season. He finished with 41 career and 26 starts at right tackle.

== Professional career ==
Pre-draft measurables
Height	Weight	Arm length	Hand span	Bench press
6 ft 3 3/4 in (1.92 m)	314 lb (142 kg)	34 in (0.86 m)	10 in (0.25 m)	27 reps
All values from NFL Combine/Pro Day

=== Dallas Cowboys ===
Knight signed with the Dallas Cowboys as an undrafted free agent following the 2019 NFL draft on May 10. He appeared in 7 games in 2019, with one start. He started at right tackle against the New York Jets, as an injury replacement for La'el Collins.

In 2020, reserve swing tackle Cameron Fleming was not re-signed, opening the door for Knight to become the backup at left tackle. After starter Tyron Smith was placed on the injured reserve list due to a neck surgery, the Cowboys announced that Knight would fill in as the replacement. He underwent a knee scope after Week 6 and was placed on injured reserve on October 24, 2020. He was activated on November 21, 2020. He appeared in 13 games with 9 starts at left tackle.

In 2021, he was mostly a reserve offensive tackle, playing only 3 snaps in one game. On October 16, 2021, Knight was waived by the Cowboys.

=== Baltimore Ravens ===
On October 18, 2021, Knight was claimed off waivers by the Baltimore Ravens. He was acquired to provide depth on the offensive line while Ronnie Stanley recovered from an ankle injury. On October 21, 2021, Knight announced that he elected not to join the team, in order to focus on his mental health. The Ravens placed him on the reserve/did not report list to keep his player rights.
