= Devin Smith (American football) =

American football player (born 1992)

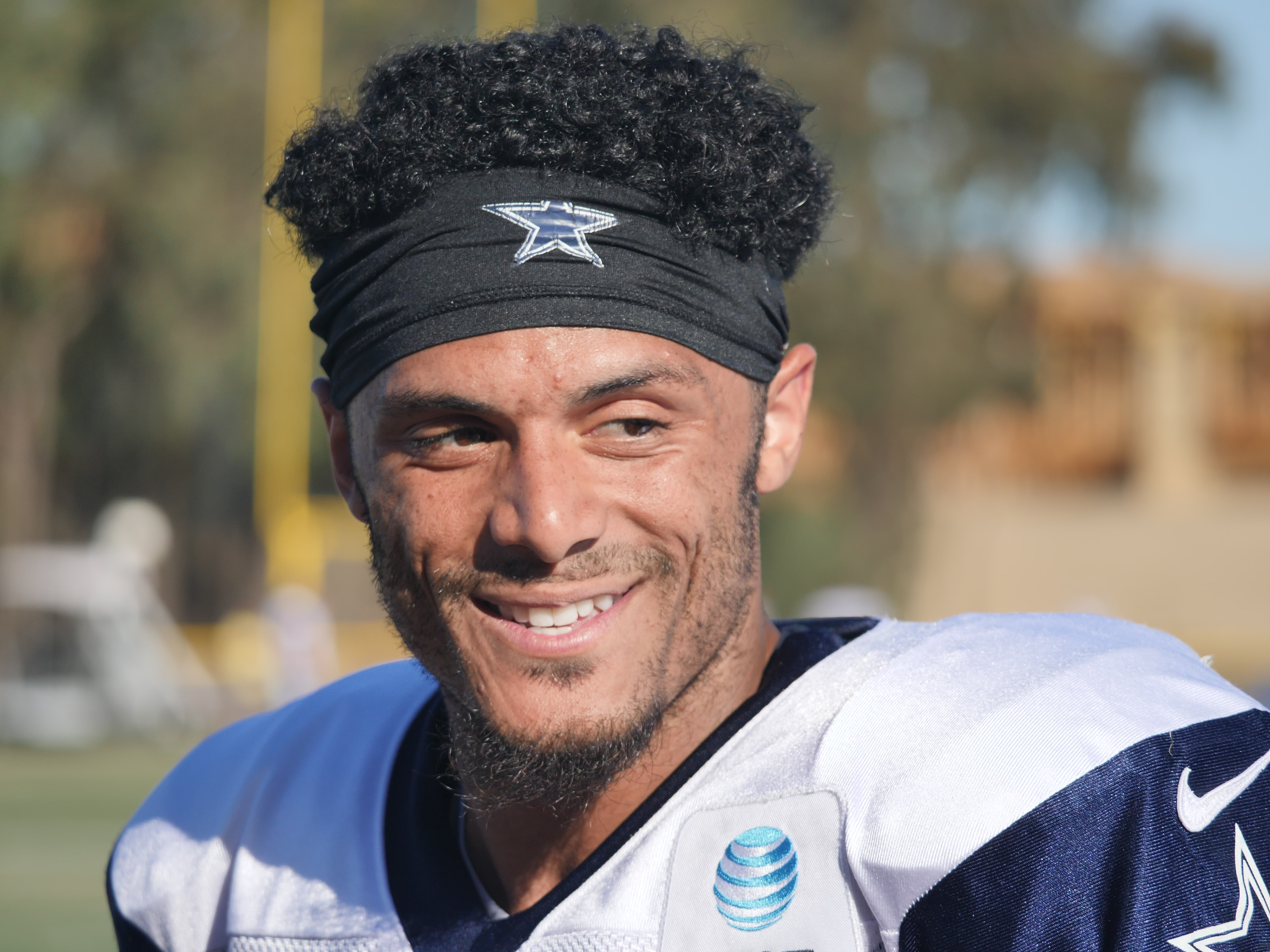
- Smith with the Dallas Cowboys in 2019

No. 19, 15, 83
- Position: Wide receiver

Personal information
- Born: March 3, 1992 (age 34); Akron, Ohio, U.S.
- Listed height: 6 ft 1 in (1.85 m)
- Listed weight: 199 lb (90 kg)

Career information
- High school: Massillon Washington (Massillon, Ohio)
- College: Ohio State (2011–2014)
- NFL draft: 2015: 2nd round, 37th overall pick

Career history
- New York Jets (2015–2017); Dallas Cowboys (2019); Houston Texans (2020)*; New England Patriots (2020–2021)*; Jacksonville Jaguars (2021); Carolina Panthers (2021)*
- * Offseason or practice squad member only

Awards and highlights
- CFP national champion (2014)

Career NFL statistics
- Receptions: 15
- Receiving yards: 248
- Receiving touchdowns: 2
- Stats at Pro Football Reference

Devin Smith (born March 3, 1992) is an American former professional football player who was a wide receiver in the National Football League (NFL). He was selected by the New York Jets in the second round of the 2015 NFL draft. He played college football for the Ohio State Buckeyes.

== Early life ==
Smith attended Massillon Washington High School in Massillon, Ohio, where he played three sports: football, track and basketball. He was a two-time first-team All-Ohio performer. He had 110 career catches for 2,119 yards and 24 touchdowns (second-best in school history). He was also named All-county Independent player of year.

He lettered 2 years in track & field at Massillon High and previously at Ellet High School in football and track. He was the state's long jump champion (24–7 or 7.55 metres). As a sprinter, he recorded a personal-best time of 10.56 seconds in the 100-meter dash at the 2011 state meet, where he placed first. He was also a state qualifier in the high jump and as part of the 4 × 200 relay.

Considered a three-star recruit by Rivals.com, Smith was rated as the 58th best wide receiver prospect of his class. On June 17, 2010, he committed to Ohio State University to play college football.

== College career ==
As a true freshman, he caught 14 passes for 294 yards and 4 touchdowns, highlighted by a 40-yard game-winning touchdown reception from Braxton Miller with 20 seconds left in a 33–29 win over Wisconsin.

As a sophomore, he started 10 games, playing in all 12. He caught 30 passes for 618 yards and six touchdowns.

As a junior, starting 12 games, he recorded 44 receptions for 660 yards and 8 touchdowns, and earned himself honorable mention all-conference honors.

As a senior, Smith had 33 receptions for 931 yards and 12 touchdowns. In the 2014 Big Ten Football Championship Game, he caught 4 passes for 137 yards and 3 touchdowns, helping the Buckeyes to a 59–0 victory over Wisconsin. In the 2015 Sugar Bowl, in which Ohio State upset No. 1 Alabama 42–35, Smith had 2 receptions for 87 yards, including a 47-yard touchdown that put his team ahead for good early in the third quarter. In the 2015 College Football Playoff National Championship victory over Oregon, he had one reception for 45 yards.

Smith finished his college career with 121 receptions for 2,503 yards and 30 touchdowns.

He also spent three spring seasons sprinting and jumping with the Buckeyes track & field team. He finished in a tie for second at the 2014 Big Ten outdoor championships in the high jump by clearing a personal, collegiate-best 7–0.25 (2.18 metres) in his first competition of the season, and qualified him for NCAA regional competition.

=== Statistics ===
| Season | Team | GP | Receiving | | | |
| Season | Team | GP | Rec | Yds | Avg | TD |
|---|---|---|---|---|---|---|
| 2011 | Ohio State | 13 | 14 | 294 | 21.0 | 4 |
| 2012 | Ohio State | 12 | 30 | 618 | 20.6 | 6 |
| 2013 | Ohio State | 14 | 44 | 660 | 15.0 | 8 |
| 2014 | Ohio State | 14 | 33 | 931 | 28.2 | 12 |
| Total | | 53 | 121 | 2,503 | 20.7 | 30 |

== Professional career ==
Pre-draft measurables
| Height | Weight | Arm length | Hand span | Wingspan | 40-yard dash | 10-yard split | 20-yard split | 20-yard shuttle | Three-cone drill | Vertical jump | Broad jump | Bench press |
|---|---|---|---|---|---|---|---|---|---|---|---|---|
| 6 ft 0 3/8 in (1.84 m) | 196 lb (89 kg) | 31 in (0.79 m) | 9 in (0.23 m) | 6 ft 3 1/8 in (1.91 m) | 4.42 s | 1.56 s | 2.59 s | 4.15 s | 6.83 s | 39.0 in (0.99 m) | 10 ft 2 in (3.10 m) | 10 reps |
All values from NFL Combine/Pro Day

=== New York Jets ===
Smith was selected by the New York Jets in the second round (37th overall) of the 2015 NFL draft. On May 8, 2015, the Jets signed Smith to a four-year, $5.87 million contract with $3.23 million guaranteed and a signing bonus of 2.53 million.

On November 29, 2015, Smith caught his first career touchdown against the Miami Dolphins. On December 12, 2015, Smith suffered a knee injury and had to leave the Week 14 matchup against the Tennessee Titans. Two days later, it was revealed that he had suffered a torn ACL, bringing his rookie season to a premature end. In 10 games of his rookie season in 2015, Smith had 115 receiving yards and a touchdown. On December 18, Smith was placed on injured reserve.

Smith started the 2016 season on Physically unable to perform (PUP) to rehabilitate his right knee suffered the previous season. He was activated off PUP to the active roster on November 9, 2016 prior to Week 10. Smith was limited to four games in 2016, recording only one reception for 20 yards.

On April 29, 2017, as the third day the 2017 NFL draft was in progress, it was revealed that Smith had suffered another torn ACL to the same knee. This was his second torn ACL of his professional career, and he would miss the entire 2017 season. On May 22, 2017, the Jets waived/injured Smith and placed him on injured reserve.

On July 16, 2018, Smith was waived by the Jets.

=== Dallas Cowboys ===
On January 18, 2019, Smith signed a reserve/future contract with the Dallas Cowboys. His play was a surprise during the preseason and was able to make the team as a backup wide receiver. In Week 2, he played against the Washington Redskins because Tavon Austin was out with an injury, catching 3 passes for 74 yards, including his first reception since 2016, which was a 51-yard touchdown to open up five straight scoring drives. In Week 3, he started against the Miami Dolphins in place of an injured Michael Gallup, registering 2 receptions for 39 yards. After appearing in the first four contests of the season, he dropped on the depth chart and was declared inactive for 12 straight games, when the Cowboys opted to instead activate wide receiver Ventell Bryant for his special teams play. He finished the season with five receptions for 113 yards and one touchdown.

On September 2, 2020, Smith was released by the Cowboys.

=== Houston Texans ===
On September 21, 2020, Smith was signed to the practice squad of the Houston Texans. He was released on November 10.

=== New England Patriots ===
On December 9, 2020, Smith was signed to the New England Patriots practice squad. He signed a reserve/future contract on January 4, 2021. He was released on July 27, 2021.

=== Jacksonville Jaguars ===
On August 28, 2021, Smith signed with the Jacksonville Jaguars. He was waived on August 31, 2021 and re-signed to the practice squad the next day. He was released on October 12.

=== Carolina Panthers ===
On October 27, 2021, Smith was signed to the Carolina Panthers practice squad. He was released on November 2, 2021.

== See also ==
- List of NCAA major college football yearly receiving leaders
