= Justin March =

American football player (born 1993)

Justin March-Lillard
No. 51, 53, 54, 59 – SMU Mustangs
- Title: Linebacker

Personal information
- Born: July 5, 1993 (age 33); Danville, Illinois, U.S.
- Listed height: 6 ft 0 in (1.83 m)
- Listed weight: 222 lb (101 kg)

Career information
- High school: Danville
- College: Akron
- NFL draft: 2015: undrafted

Career history

Playing
- Kansas City Chiefs (2015–2016); Miami Dolphins (2017); Seattle Seahawks (2017); Dallas Cowboys (2017–2020); Tennessee Titans (2021)*; San Francisco 49ers (2021)*; New Orleans Saints (2021)*; Las Vegas Raiders (2021)
- * Offseason or practice squad member only

Coaching
- SMU (2026) Assistant Special Teams Coordinator

Awards and highlights
- Third-team All-MAC (2013)

Career NFL statistics
- Games played: 61
- Total tackles: 45
- Pass deflections: 3
- Stats at Pro Football Reference

Justin March-Lillard (born July 5, 1993) is an American former professional football player who was a linebacker in the National Football League (NFL). He played college football for the Akron Zips.

== Early life ==
March-Lillard attended Danville High School, where he played as a linebacker. As a junior, he had 203 tackles, 6 sacks and helped his team win the conference championship.

As a senior, he made 153 tackles, 2 sacks, contributing to his team winning back-to-back conference championships. He received All-Conference, All-Area and All-Area Player of the Year honors. He also practiced basketball and baseball.

== College career ==
March-Lillard accepted a football scholarship from the University of Akron. As a freshman, he appeared in 12 games (2 starts), tallying 36 tackles. He had 9 tackles against the University of Cincinnati.

As a sophomore, he started in 11 games, collecting 62 tackles (third on the team), 2 tackles for loss, one interception and 3 passes defensed. He made 11 tackles against the University of Massachusetts and 10 tackles against Northern Illinois University.

As a junior, he started 12 games at strongside linebacker, registering 80 tackles (second on the team), 4.5 tackles for loss, 3 interceptions (tied for the team lead), 2 passes defensed, one sack and one defensive touchdown. Against the University of Michigan, he had 4 tackles (1 for loss) and 2 interceptions, including one returned for a touchdown. He made 10 tackles against Ball State University.

As a senior, he started 10 games at strongside linebacker, posting 72 tackles (second on the team), 6 tackles for loss, 2 sacks, 8 passes defensed and 2 forced fumbles. He did not play against Marshall University because of injury. He had 8 tackles and 2 sacks against Miami University.

== Professional career ==
Pre-draft measurables
| Height | Weight | Arm length | Hand span | 40-yard dash | 10-yard split | 20-yard split | 20-yard shuttle | Three-cone drill | Vertical jump | Broad jump | Bench press |
|---|---|---|---|---|---|---|---|---|---|---|---|
| 5 ft 11 1/8 in (1.81 m) | 227 lb (103 kg) | 32 5/8 in (0.83 m) | 8 3/4 in (0.22 m) | 4.70 s | 1.60 s | 2.63 s | 4.44 s | 7.31 s | 36.0 in (0.91 m) | 10 ft 2 in (3.10 m) | 16 reps |
All values from Pro Day

=== Kansas City Chiefs ===
March-Lillard was signed as an undrafted free agent by the Kansas City Chiefs after the 2015 NFL draft. On September 1, he was placed on the injured reserve list with a meniscus tear in his right knee.

In 2016, he started the first 5 games at the right inside linebacker position next to Pro Bowl player Derrick Johnson, while collecting 22 tackles (one for loss) and 2 pass defensed. He had 9 tackles in the season opener against the San Diego Chargers. The next week, he had 8 tackles (one for loss) against the Houston Texans. On October 18, he was placed on the injured reserve list with a broken hand that he suffered in Week 5 against the Oakland Raiders. On December 30, he was activated off injured reserve to the active roster.

On September 2, 2017, March-Lillard was waived by the Chiefs.

=== Miami Dolphins ===
On September 3, 2017, March-Lillard was claimed off waivers by the Miami Dolphins. He appeared in two games without recording any stat. He was waived by the Dolphins on September 26.

=== Seattle Seahawks ===
On September 27, 2017, March-Lillard was claimed off waivers by the Seattle Seahawks. He appeared in one game without recording any stat. He was waived by the Seahawks on October 7.

=== Dallas Cowboys ===
On October 11, 2017, March-Lillard signed with the Dallas Cowboys as a free agent, his fourth team in nearly a month. He was a backup linebacker that appeared in 7 games and was declared inactive in 4 contests. He posted 5 special teams tackles.

In 2018, he appeared in all 16 games as a reserve player, while registering 7 special teams tackles (fifth on the team) and one defensive tackle.

On March 7, 2019, he was re-signed to a one-year contract. He appeared in all 16 games, tallying 10 tackles, 2 passes defensed and 7 special teams tackles (third on the team). He had 8 tackles and 2 passes defensed in the fourteenth game against the Los Angeles Rams.

On March 21, 2020, March re-signed with the Cowboys. He was released during final roster cuts on September 5, 2020, but was re-signed two days later. He was placed on injured reserve on December 19, 2020. He was placed on the reserve/COVID-19 list by the team on January 2, 2021, and moved back to injured reserve on February 1. He appeared in 12 games and ranked fourth on the team with 5 special teams tackles. He was not re-signed after the season.

=== Tennessee Titans ===
On May 6, 2021, March signed with the Tennessee Titans. He was released on September 6, 2021.

=== San Francisco 49ers ===
On December 1, 2021, March was signed to the San Francisco 49ers practice squad. He was released on December 6.

=== New Orleans Saints ===
On December 27, 2021, March was signed to the New Orleans Saints practice squad, but was released the next day.

=== Las Vegas Raiders ===
On December 29, 2021, March was signed by the Las Vegas Raiders. He was released on January 5, 2022. After the Raiders were eliminated in the 2021 Wild Card round of the playoffs. He signed a reserve/future contract on January 17, 2022. He was released on May 9, 2022.
