= Kerry Hyder =

American football player (born 1991)

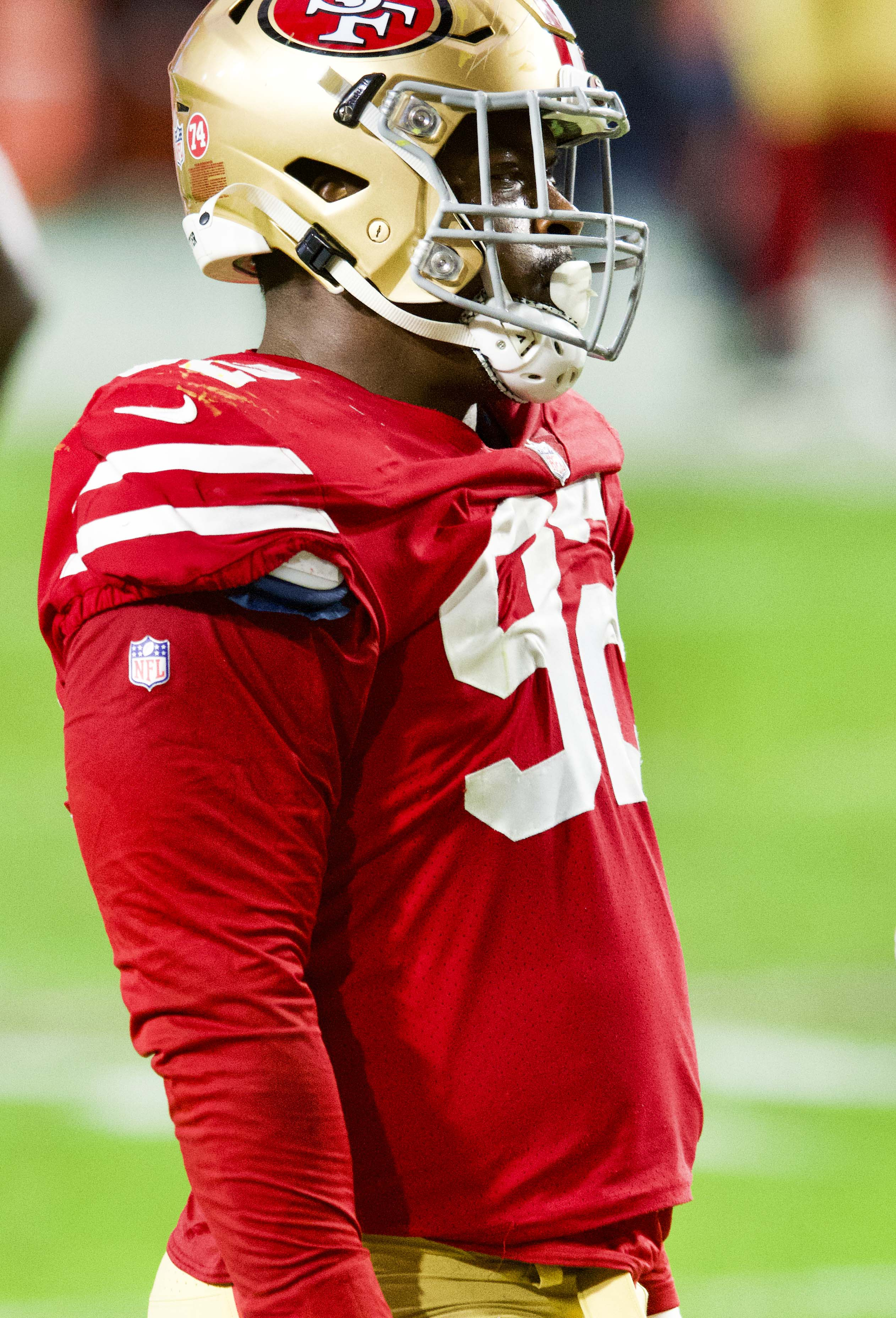
- Hyder with the San Francisco 49ers in 2020

No. 61, 51, 92, 56
- Position: Defensive end

Personal information
- Born: May 2, 1991 (age 35); Austin, Texas, U.S.
- Listed height: 6 ft 2 in (1.88 m)
- Listed weight: 275 lb (125 kg)

Career information
- High school: Lyndon B. Johnson (Austin, Texas)
- College: Texas Tech (2010-2013)
- NFL draft: 2014: undrafted

Career history
- New York Jets (2014)*; Detroit Lions (2015–2018); Dallas Cowboys (2019); San Francisco 49ers (2020); Seattle Seahawks (2021); San Francisco 49ers (2022–2023); Houston Texans (2023)
- * Offseason or practice squad member only

Awards and highlights
- First-team All-Big 12 (2012); Second-team All-Big 12 (2013)

Career NFL statistics
- Total tackles: 163
- Sacks: 22
- Fumble recoveries: 6
- Pass deflections: 4
- Stats at Pro Football Reference

Kerry Hyder Jr. (born May 2, 1991) is an American former professional football player who was a defensive end in the National Football League (NFL). He played college football for the Texas Tech Red Raiders.

== Early life ==
Hyder played linebacker and defensive end for Lyndon B. Johnson High School in Austin, Texas. Hyder was ranked as a 3-star prospect by Rivals.com and held offers from Cincinnati, Iowa State, Minnesota, New Mexico, Texas Tech, Toledo, and Utah.

== College career ==
Hyder accepted a scholarship offer to play for Texas Tech in 2009 and redshirted his freshman season. In his redshirt freshman season in 2010, Hyder played in 11 games, and logged 13 tackles and 3.5 tackles for loss.

In 2011, Hyder started all 12 games for the Red Raiders and logged 42 tackles, 5 tackles for loss, 1.5 sacks, and one forced fumble.

The 2012 season proved to be Hyder's breakout year with four organizations naming him to preseason All-Big 12 Conference lists. Hyder concluded the season with All-Big 12 Conference honors from Phil Steele, the Austin-American Statesman, the Associated Press, and CBS Sports, among others.

Hyder's senior season in 2013 began with pre-season All-Big 12 Conference listings by several organizations, as well as listings on the Lombardi Award, Bronko Nagurski Award and Outland Trophy watchlists. Hyder's senior season concluded with several All-Big 12 conference selections. Hyder logged 65 tackles, 11.5 tackles for loss, 2 sacks, 3 forced fumbles, 2 blocked kicks, one pass defensed and one fumble recovery.

He finished his college career with 49 games (41 starts), 176 tackles, 11 sacks, 10 passes defensed, 3 forced fumbles and 2 fumble recoveries.

== Professional career ==
Pre-draft measurables
Height	Weight	Arm length	Hand span	Wingspan	40-yard dash	10-yard split	20-yard split	20-yard shuttle	Three-cone drill	Vertical jump	Broad jump	Bench press
6 ft 2 1/2 in (1.89 m)	290 lb (132 kg)	33 1/2 in (0.85 m)	9 3/4 in (0.25 m)	6 ft 7 1/4 in (2.01 m)	4.97 s	1.76 s	2.92 s	4.33 s	7.23 s	30.0 in (0.76 m)	9 ft 1 in (2.77 m)	20 reps
All values from NFL Combine/Pro Day

=== New York Jets ===
On May 11, 2014, the New York Jets signed Hyder to a three-year, $1.53 million contract as an undrafted free agent defensive tackle after he was not selected during the 2014 NFL draft. His contract included a signing bonus of $4,000. He was released on August 30, and was re-signed to the team's practice squad a day later.

=== Detroit Lions ===
Hyder was signed to a reserve/future contract by the Detroit Lions on January 6, 2015. Hyder did not make the final 53-man roster out of training camp but was re-signed to the practice squad after clearing waivers. He appeared in one game and did not record any stats.

In the offseason before the 2016 season, Hyder shed 35 pounds and transitioned to defensive end. He was promoted to the active roster on January 2, 2016. After recording three sacks in the Lions final preseason game in 2016, he made the Lions 53-man roster. In the first game of the regular season, Hyder recorded two sacks on Indianapolis Colts quarterback Andrew Luck as the Lions won 39-35. He recorded 1.5 sacks in the Week 2 game against the Tennessee Titans. After an ankle injury to all-pro defensive end Ezekiel Ansah, Hyder made his first career NFL start on September 25, against the Green Bay Packers in Week 3, recording another sack. He was nominated as the pre-game Gruden Grinder before a Monday night tilt with the Dallas Cowboys by broadcaster Jon Gruden on December 26, 2016. Hyder finished his breakout season by leading the Lions in both sacks (8) and tackles for loss (11). He also had 36 tackles, one pass defensed and one fumble recovery. He also was named the 2016 Detroit Lions Media-Friendly "Good Guy Award" winner by members of the Pro Football Writers Association and Detroit Sports Media Association.

In the Lions first 2017 preseason game against the Indianapolis Colts, Hyder suffered a season-ending torn Achilles injury. He was placed on injured reserve on August 15, 2017.

On March 10, 2018, the Lions re-signed Hyder to a one-year contract extension. He appeared in 8 games as a backup, collecting 6 tackles (one for loss) and one sack.

=== Dallas Cowboys ===
On March 18, 2019, the Cowboys signed Hyder to a one-year, $1 million contract that included $300,000 guaranteed and a signing bonus of $100,000. In week 7 against the Philadelphia Eagles, Hyder recovered a fumble lost by Carson Wentz in the 37–10 win. He was a backup, appearing in all 16 games, while posting 19 tackles (2 for loss), one sack, 19 quarterback pressures and one fumble recovery.

=== San Francisco 49ers (first stint) ===
On March 25, 2020, the San Francisco 49ers signed Hyder to a one-year, $1.50 million contract that included $550,000 guaranteed. The season-ending injuries to Nick Bosa and Dee Ford, allowed Hyder to earn a starting role at right defensive end. In Week 12 against the Los Angeles Rams, Hyder recorded two sacks and recovered a fumble lost by Jared Goff during the 23–20 win. He appeared in 16 games with 14 starts, posting career-highs with 49 tackles (10 for loss), 8.5 sacks and one fumble recovery.

=== Seattle Seahawks ===
On March 25, 2021, the Seattle Seahawks signed Hyder to a two-year, $6.80 million contract, that includes $3.65 million guaranteed and a signing bonus of $2.55 million. He appeared in 15 games with 7 starts at left defensive end, registering 33 tackles (3 for loss), 1.5 sacks and 2 fumble recoveries. He was released on March 18, 2022.

=== San Francisco 49ers (second stint) ===
On March 24, 2022, Hyder signed a one-year contract with the 49ers. He appeared in 16 games with one start, posting 19 tackles (one for loss), 3 passes defensed and one fumble recovery.

On April 17, 2023, Hyder re-signed with the 49ers on a one-year contract. He was released on October 6. He appeared in 4 games, making one tackle (one for loss).

=== Houston Texans ===
On October 10, 2023, Hyder was signed to the Houston Texans' practice squad. He was promoted to the active roster on November 23. He was released on December 5 and re-signed to the practice squad two days later. He appeared in 2 games, collecting 2 tackles (one for loss). He was not signed to a reserve/future contract after the season and thus became a free agent when his practice squad contract expired.
