= Jalen Jelks =

American football player (born 1996)

No. 74
- Position: Defensive end

Personal information
- Born: August 3, 1996 (age 30); Phoenix, Arizona, U.S.
- Listed height: 6 ft 5 in (1.96 m)
- Listed weight: 256 lb (116 kg)

Career information
- High school: Desert Vista (Phoenix)
- College: Oregon
- NFL draft: 2019: 7th round, 241st overall pick

Career history
- Dallas Cowboys (2019); Carolina Panthers (2020)*; Cleveland Browns (2020)*; Washington Football Team / Commanders (2020–2021)
- * Offseason or practice squad member only

Awards and highlights
- First-team All-Pac-12 (2018); Second-team All-Pac-12 (2017)
- Stats at Pro Football Reference

Jalen Jelks (born August 3, 1996) is an American former professional football player who was a defensive end in the National Football League (NFL). He played college football for the Oregon Ducks.

== Early life ==
Jelks attended Desert Vista High School. He played football in only 3 years. As a senior, he was a two-way starter at defensive line and left tackle. He registered 72 tackles (12 for loss), 10 sacks, 3 forced fumbles and one blocked field goal, while receiving All-state honors.

He finished his high school career with 113 tackles (17 for loss), 15 sacks, 4 forced fumbles and 3 fumble recoveries. A 3-star recruit, Jelks committed to play football at Oregon over offers from Arizona State, California, Nebraska, Tennessee, Utah, Washington, and Wisconsin, among others.

== College career ==
Jelks accepted a football scholarship from the University of Oregon. After redshirting for a year, he appeared in 11 games as a backup defensive end, collecting 9 tackles (6 in the final three games) and 3 sacks as a freshman. As a sophomore in a reserve role, he contributed with 31 tackles (4 for loss), 2 sacks and 2 pass breakups in 8 games.

As a junior, he started all 13 games, recording 59 tackles 6.5 sacks (led the team), 15 tackles for loss (led the team) and 7 pass breakups. He had 9 tackles in the 2017 Las Vegas Bowl. He was put on the watchlist for the Chuck Bednarik Award during the season. He was named to the All-Pac-12 Conference second-team, Pro Football Focus first-team All-Pac-12 and the Phil Steele second-team All-Pac-12 Conference.

Despite speculation that he could declare for the 2018 NFL draft, Jelks announced that he would return to Oregon. As a senior in 12 starts, he registered 57 tackles (7.5 for loss) and 3.5 sacks.

== Professional career ==
Pre-draft measurables
Height	Weight	Arm length	Hand span	40-yard dash	20-yard shuttle	Three-cone drill	Vertical jump	Broad jump	Bench press
6 ft 5 3/8 in (1.97 m)	256 lb (116 kg)	34 5/8 in (0.88 m)	9 5/8 in (0.24 m)	4.92 s	4.59 s	7.22 s	32.5 in (0.83 m)	9 ft 5 in (2.87 m)	19 reps
All values from NFL Combine

=== Dallas Cowboys ===
Jelks was selected by the Dallas Cowboys in the seventh round (241st overall) of the 2019 NFL draft. He was placed on the injured reserve list on August 30. On August 16, 2020, he was released to make room for the signing of free agent defensive end Everson Griffen.

=== Carolina Panthers ===
On August 17, 2020, Jelks was claimed off waivers by the Carolina Panthers. He was waived on September 5.

=== Cleveland Browns ===
Jelks was signed to the practice squad of the Cleveland Browns on September 22, 2020. He was released on October 26.

=== Washington Football Team ===
On November 15, 2020, Jelks signed to the practice squad of the Washington Football Team. He was waived/injured on December 12, 2020. He signed a reserve/futures contract on January 10, 2021. Jelks was waived by Washington with an injury designation on July 26, 2021, and reverted to injured reserve after clearing waivers. He wasn't re-signed after the season.
