= Adam Redmond =

American football player (born 1993)

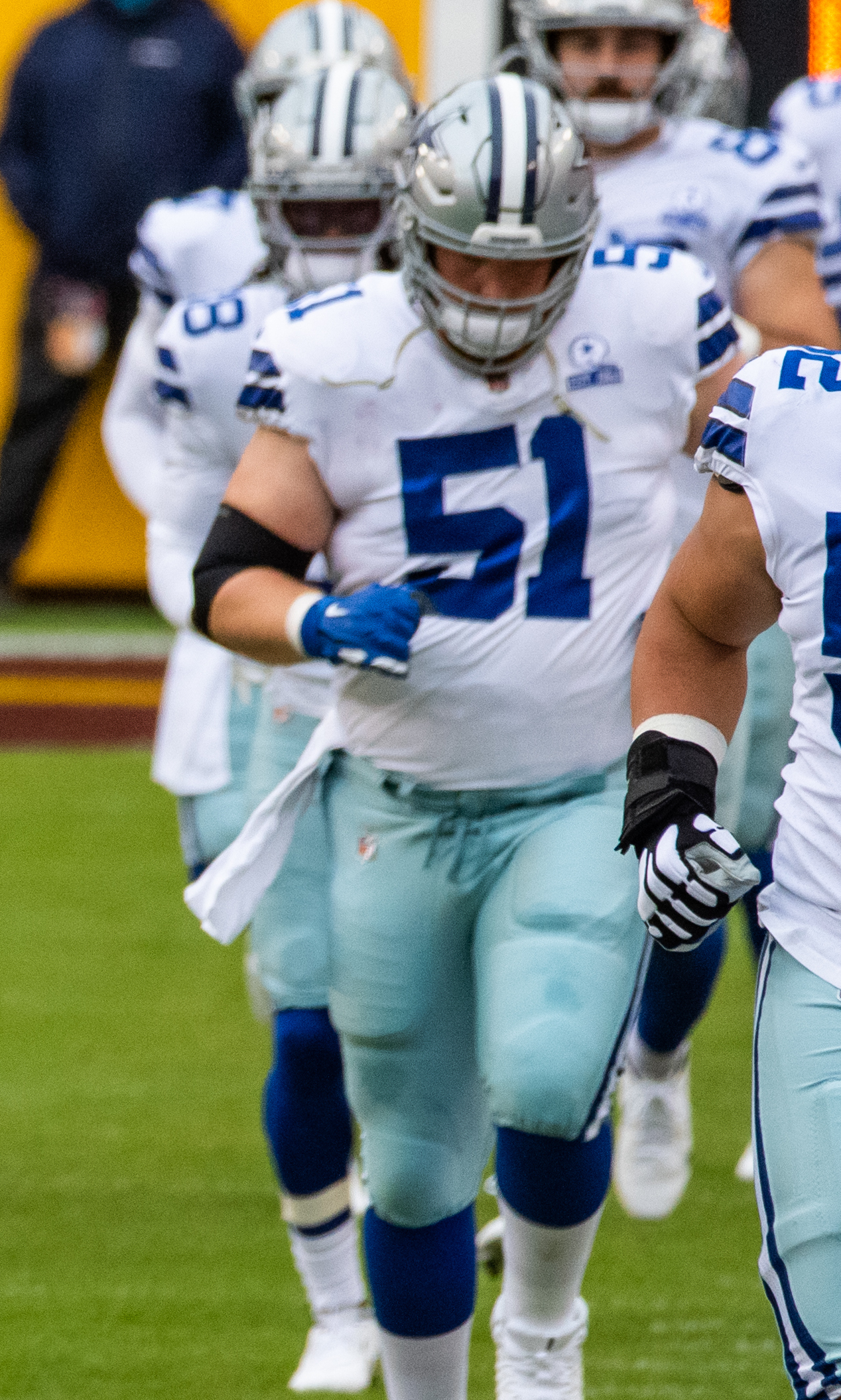
- Redmond with the Dallas Cowboys in 2020

No. 61, 51
- Position: Center

Personal information
- Born: May 19, 1993 (age 33); Strongsville, Ohio, U.S.
- Listed height: 6 ft 6 in (1.98 m)
- Listed weight: 290 lb (132 kg)

Career information
- High school: Walsh Jesuit (Cuyahoga Falls, Ohio)
- College: Harvard
- NFL draft: 2016: undrafted

Career history
- Indianapolis Colts (2016–2017); Buffalo Bills (2017–2018)*; Dallas Cowboys (2018–2020); Chicago Bears (2021)*; Baltimore Ravens (2021)
- * Offseason or practice squad member only

Awards and highlights
- First-team All-Ivy League (2015)

Career NFL statistics
- Games played: 18
- Stats at Pro Football Reference

Adam Redmond (born May 19, 1993) is an American former professional football player who was a center in the National Football League (NFL). He was signed by the Indianapolis Colts as an undrafted free agent after the 2016 NFL draft. He played college football for the Harvard Crimson.

== Early life ==
Redmond attended Walsh Jesuit High School, where he received Division Two All-district honors in his last 2 years as a starter at offensive tackle and long snapper. He accepted a football scholarship from Harvard University. As a sophomore in 2013, he started 9 games at left tackle.

As a junior in 2014, he started all 10 games at left tackle and received honorable-mention All-Ivy League honors. As a senior in 2015, he started all 10 games at center and was named first-team All-Ivy League. He played a total of 31 career games and studied sociology.

== Professional career ==
=== Indianapolis Colts ===
Redmond was signed as an undrafted free agent by the Indianapolis Colts after the 2016 NFL draft on May 2. He was released by the Colts on September 3, 2016, and was signed to the practice squad the next day. He spent time on and off the Colts' practice squad during the season before signing a reserve/future contract with the team on January 2, 2017.

On September 2, 2017, Redmond was waived by the Colts and was signed to the practice squad the next day. He was promoted to the active roster on September 9. He appeared in the first 4 games, before being waived on October 6.

=== Buffalo Bills ===
On October 10, 2017, Redmond was signed to the Buffalo Bills' practice squad. He signed a reserve/future contract with the Bills on January 8, 2018. On September 1, 2018, Redmond was waived by the Bills.

=== Dallas Cowboys ===
On September 2, 2018, Redmond was claimed off waivers by the Dallas Cowboys. He appeared in 10 games as a backup offensive lineman. In 2019, he was declared inactive in the first 9 games, before being placed on the injured reserve list on November 16.

On March 9, 2020, Redmond signed a one-year deal with the Cowboys. He was released on September 2, 2020. He was re-signed to the practice squad on October 12, 2020. He was elevated to the active roster on October 24 and November 21 for the team's weeks 7 and 11 games against the Washington Football Team and Minnesota Vikings, and reverted to the practice squad after each game. He was promoted to the active roster on November 25, 2020. He was waived on December 12, 2020, and re-signed to the practice squad four days later. He signed a reserve/future contract with the Cowboys on January 4, 2021. He was released on May 5, 2021.

=== Chicago Bears ===
On May 19, 2021, Redmond signed with the Chicago Bears. He was released on August 31, 2021.

=== Baltimore Ravens ===
On October 20, 2021, Redmond was signed to the Baltimore Ravens practice squad. His contract expired on January 10, 2022.
