= Kavon Frazier =

American football player (born 1994)

No. 35, 43
- Position: Safety

Personal information
- Born: August 11, 1994 (age 32); Grand Rapids, Michigan, U.S.
- Listed height: 6 ft 0 in (1.83 m)
- Listed weight: 220 lb (100 kg)

Career information
- High school: Grand Rapids Christian
- College: Central Michigan (2012–2015)
- NFL draft: 2016: 6th round, 212th overall pick

Career history
- Dallas Cowboys (2016–2019); Miami Dolphins (2020); Cincinnati Bengals (2021)*; Las Vegas Raiders (2021)
- * Offseason or practice squad member only

Awards and highlights
- Second-team All-MAC (2015)

Career NFL statistics
- Games played: 60
- Totall tackles: 73
- Sacks: 1.0
- Forced fumbles: 1
- Pass deflections: 1
- Stats at Pro Football Reference

Kavon Frazier (born August 11, 1994) is an American former professional football player who was a safety in the National Football League (NFL) for the Dallas Cowboys, Miami Dolphins, and Las Vegas Raiders. He played college football for the Central Michigan Chippewas.

== Early life ==
Frazier attended Grand Rapids Christian High School, where he practiced football, basketball and track. In football, he was a three-year starter. As a junior, he was named to the all-conference team. He was a two-way player as a senior, registering 66 tackles, 858 rushing yards and 15 touchdowns, while receiving Division 3/4 All-state, Detroit Free Press All-Area and All-conference honors.

In basketball, he helped lead the team to a pair of conference titles and a district title as a senior.

== College career ==
Frazier accepted a football scholarship from Central Michigan University. As a freshman, he appeared in 13 games, collecting 36 tackles, 3 passes defensed, one interception and one forced fumble. He had 11 tackles and one pass defensed against Navy.

As a sophomore, he appeared in 12 games (9 starts), registering 67 tackles (fourth on the team), 3 interceptions (tied for the team lead) and 5 passes defensed (tied for the team lead). He had 11 tackles (7 solos) against the University of Toledo.

As a junior, he appeared in 13 games (3 starts), posting 58 tackles (fourth on the team), 34 solo tackles, 4 passes defensed and one fumble recovery.

As a senior, he was the regular starter at strong safety, recording 108 tackles (led the team), 74 solo tackles (led the team), 4.5 tackles for a loss, 4 passes defensed, one interception and one blocked punt. He had 13 tackles against Oklahoma State University. He made 12 tackles against the University of Toledo. He is a member of Phi Beta Sigma fraternity.

== Professional career ==
Pre-draft measurables
Height	Weight	Arm length	Hand span	Bench press
5 ft 11 7/8 in (1.83 m)	217 lb (98 kg)	32 1/4 in (0.82 m)	9 in (0.23 m)	18 reps
All values from NFL Combine

=== Dallas Cowboys ===
Frazier was selected by the Dallas Cowboys in the sixth round (212th overall) of the 2016 NFL draft. As a rookie he played mainly on special teams and was declared inactive in 4 games. He tallied 2 defensive tackles and 4 special teams tackles.

In 2017, he finished second on the team with 11 special teams tackles. He began to be used more on the defense, making 32 tackles (2 for loss). He appeared in 15 contests and was declared inactive for the fifth game against the Green Bay Packers.

Prior to 2018 preseason, Frazier was placed on non-football-related injured reserve on July 26 due to him having a potential blood disorder. He was tested negative for haemophilia and other blood clotting disorders on August 3, putting him back on the active roster. He appeared in all 16 games, starting the first two games of the season in place of an injured Xavier Woods. He posted 18 tackles (one for loss), one sack, one quarterback pressure, 2 passes defensed and 8 special teams tackles (fourth on the team).

In 2019, he was the backup at strong safety, collecting 4 defensive tackles and one special teams tackle in the first four games of the season. On September 30, he was placed on the injured reserve with a pectoral injury. He was not re-signed after the season.

=== Miami Dolphins ===
On April 27, 2020, Frazier signed with the Miami Dolphins. He appeared in 15 games as a reserve player. He was declared inactive in the fourth game against the Seattle Seahawks. He had 2 tackles on defense and 4 on special teams. He was not re-signed after the season.

=== Cincinnati Bengals ===
On May 27, 2021, Frazier signed with the Cincinnati Bengals. He was released on August 22, 2021.

=== Las Vegas Raiders ===
On December 2, 2021, Frazier was signed to the practice squad of the Las Vegas Raiders. He appeared in one game. After the Raiders were eliminated in the 2021 Wild Card round of the playoffs, he signed a reserve/future contract on January 17, 2022. He was released on March 8, 2022.

On July 29, 2022, Frazier announced his retirement from professional football.
