= Cameron Fleming =

American football player (born 1992)

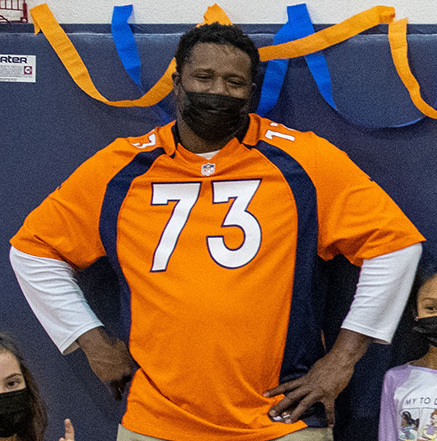
- Fleming with the Denver Broncos in 2021

Profile
- Position: Offensive tackle

Personal information
- Born: September 3, 1992 (age 34); Fort Hood, Texas, U.S.
- Listed height: 6 ft 5 in (1.96 m)
- Listed weight: 320 lb (145 kg)

Career information
- High school: Cypress Creek (Houston, Texas)
- College: Stanford (2010–2013)
- NFL draft: 2014: 4th round, 140th overall pick

Career history
- New England Patriots (2014–2017); Dallas Cowboys (2018–2019); New York Giants (2020); Denver Broncos (2021–2024)

Awards and highlights
- 2× Super Bowl champion (XLIX, LI); Second-team All-Pac-12 (2013)

Career NFL statistics as of 2024
- Games played: 118
- Games started: 62
- Stats at Pro Football Reference

Cameron Jarrod Fleming (born September 3, 1992) is an American professional football offensive tackle. He was selected by the New England Patriots in the fourth round of the 2014 NFL draft. He played college football for the Stanford Cardinal. Fleming has also had stints with the Dallas Cowboys, New York Giants, and Denver Broncos.

== Early life ==
Fleming attended Cypress Creek High School in Houston, Texas. He played football for Cypress Creek.

Considered a three-star recruit by Rivals.com, he was rated as the 38th best offensive tackle prospect of his class.

== College career ==
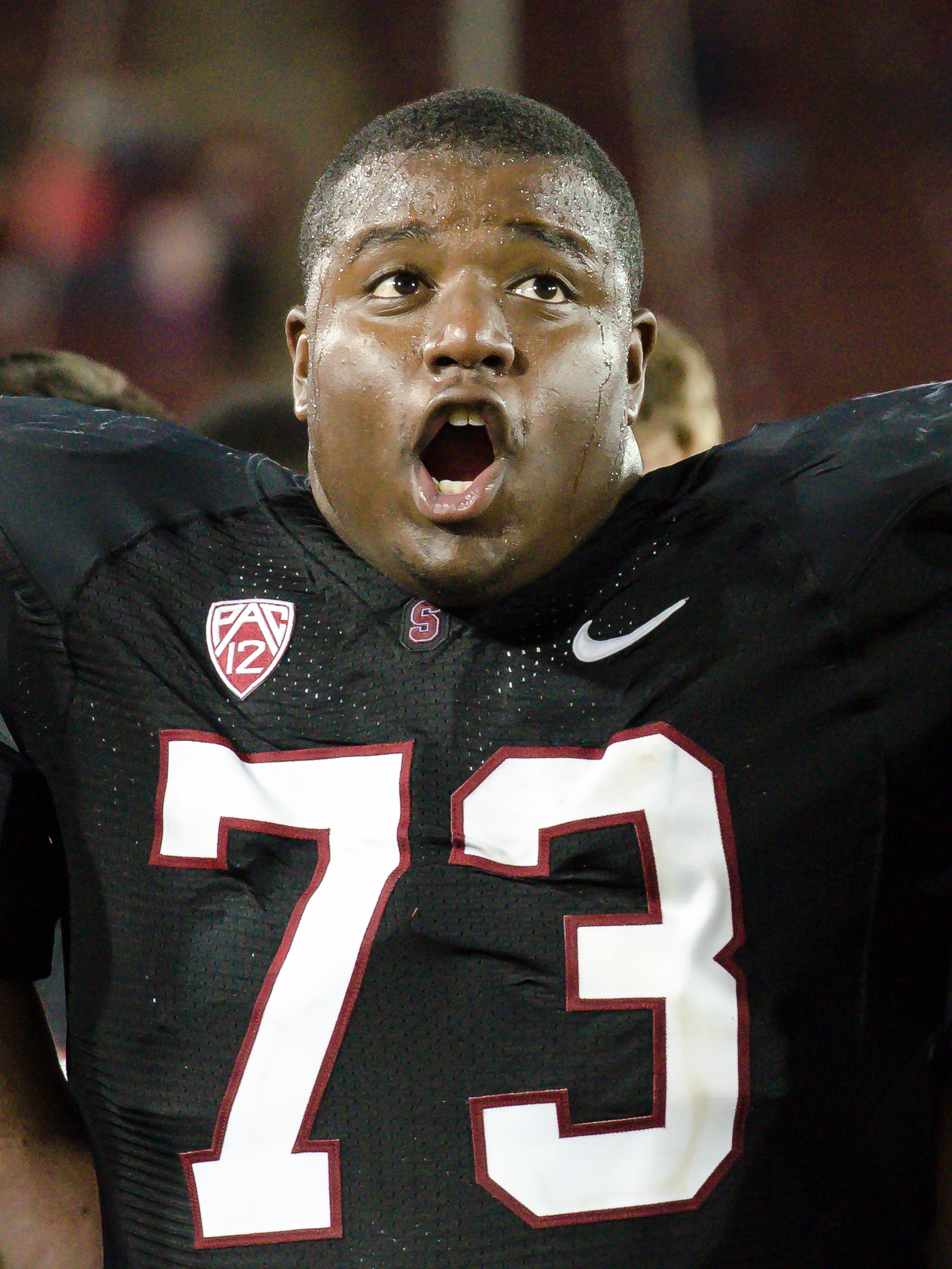
Fleming with the Stanford Cardinal in 2013

Fleming attended Stanford University from 2010 to 2013, but was redshirted in his freshman year in 2010. He became a freshman All-American as a redshirt freshman in 2011. He was an all-Pac-12 Conference honorable mention in his sophomore season. As a junior, Fleming made the All-Pac-12 second-team. He decided to forgo his senior season and enter the NFL draft. He started 39 games at right tackle during his career. He entered the 2014 NFL draft after his junior season.

== Professional career ==
External videos
- 2014 NFL Combine Cameron Fleming

Pre-draft measurables
Height	Weight	Arm length	Hand span	40-yard dash	10-yard split	20-yard split	20-yard shuttle	Three-cone drill	Vertical jump	Broad jump	Bench press
6 ft 4 7/8 in (1.95 m)	323 lb (147 kg)	34 in (0.86 m)	9 7/8 in (0.25 m)	5.28 s	1.85 s	3.08 s	5.00 s	8.24 s	25.5 in (0.65 m)	8 ft 1 in (2.46 m)	26 reps
All values from NFL Combine

=== New England Patriots ===
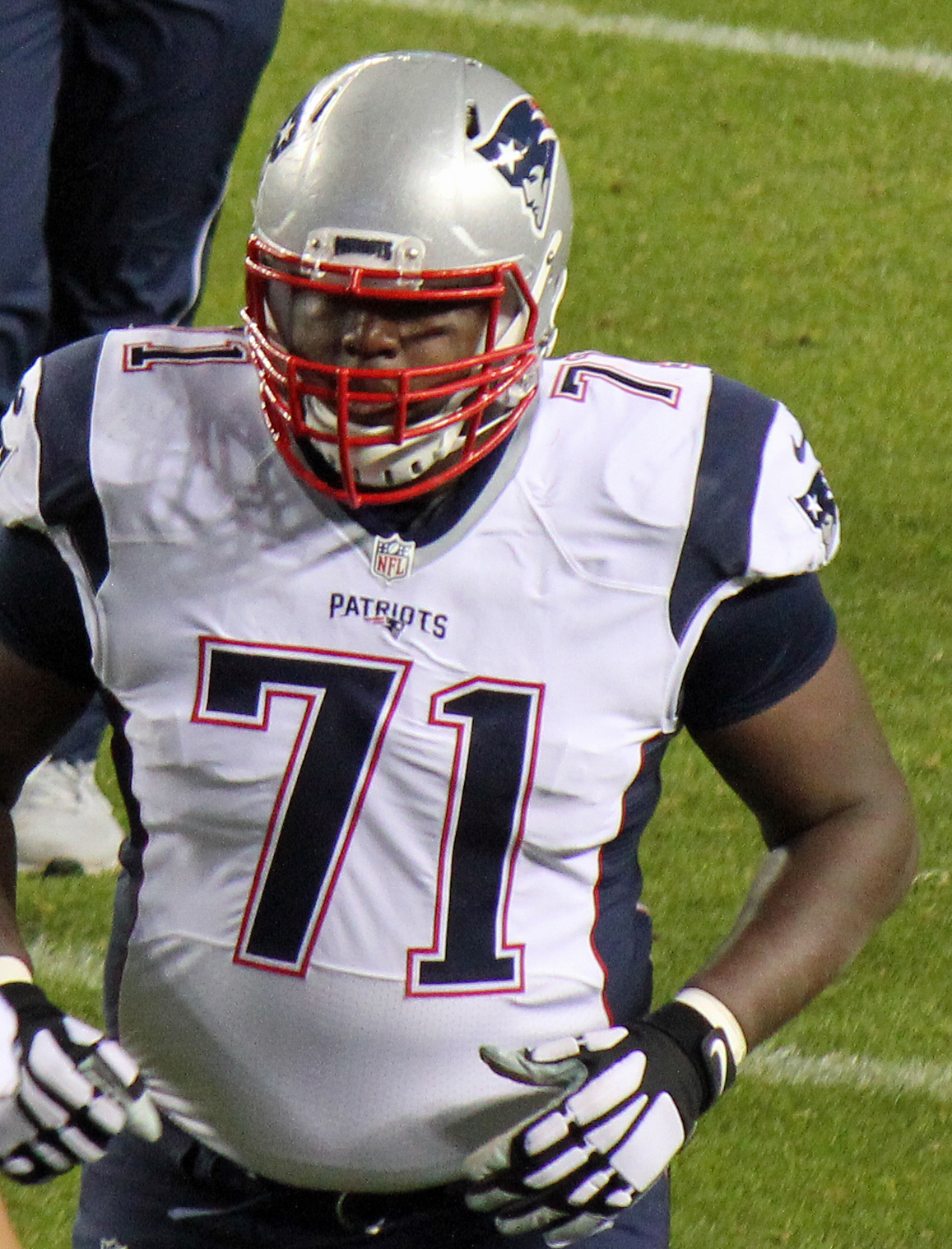
Fleming with the Patriots in 2015

Fleming was selected in the fourth round of the 2014 NFL draft by the New England Patriots. Fleming appeared in nine games in the 2014 season including the playoffs and won Super Bowl XLIX with the Patriots.

Fleming was a surprise cut by the Patriots at the end of the 2015 preseason but was signed to the Patriots' practice squad. He was promoted to the active roster on October 16, 2015, after starting left tackle Nate Solder was placed on season-ending injured reserve with a torn biceps.

In the 2016 season, Fleming played in all 16 regular-season games with five starts mainly as a reserve tackle and reporting as an extra blocker. He contributed to the Patriots' 14-2 record, which earned them the top-seed for the American Football Conference (AFC) playoffs.

On February 5, 2017, Fleming was part of the Patriots team that won Super Bowl LI. In the game, the Patriots defeated the Atlanta Falcons by a score of 34–28 in overtime. The Patriots trailed 28–3 in the third quarter, but rallied all the way back to win the game, which featured the first overtime game in Super Bowl history and the largest comeback in the Super Bowl.

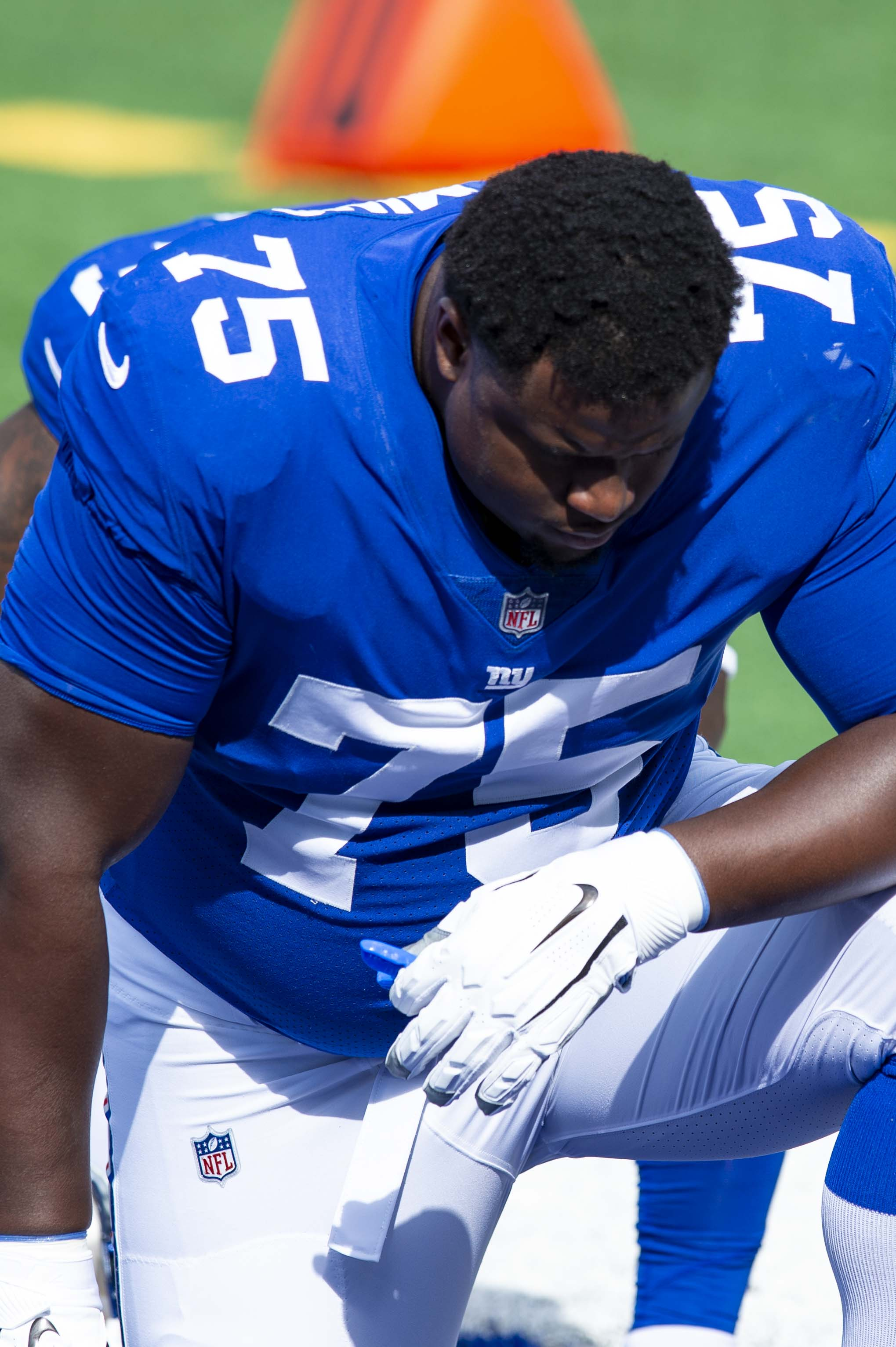
Fleming with the New York Giants in 2020

On September 24, 2017, Fleming made his first start of the season at left tackle against the Houston Texans. He finished the 2017 season with five consecutive starts to finish the regular season. On January 21, 2018, Fleming started at right tackle in the AFC Championship Game, making his first career postseason start. Two weeks later, he started at right tackle in the Super Bowl, where the Patriots lost to the Philadelphia Eagles 41–33.

=== Dallas Cowboys ===
On March 26, 2018, Fleming signed a one-year contract with the Dallas Cowboys worth up to $3.5 million. He played in 14 games, starting three at left tackle in place of an injured Tyron Smith.

On March 13, 2019, Fleming signed a two-year, $7.5 million contract extension with the Cowboys. He played in 14 games, starting three at left tackle in place of an injured Smith. On March 17, 2020, the Cowboys declined the option on Fleming's contract, making him an unrestricted free agent.

=== New York Giants ===
On March 26, 2020, Fleming signed with the New York Giants, reuniting with former Cowboys head coach Jason Garrett and offensive line coach Marc Colombo. He started all 16 games at right tackle in 2020.

=== Denver Broncos ===
On May 20, 2021, Fleming signed a one-year, $1.67 million contract with the Denver Broncos, after the team released offensive tackle Ja'Wuan James. He was released in a planned move on August 31, 2021. He was re-signed on September 2, 2021. He appeared in 5 games with 4 starts at right tackle.

He re-signed with the Broncos on July 27, 2022. He appeared in 15 games with 15 starts, nine of them coming at right tackle. He missed two games against the Tennessee Titans and the Jacksonville Jaguars because of a quad injury.

The Broncos re-signed Fleming to a one year, $4 million contract on May 23, 2023.

After going unsigned during the 2024 NFL offseason, he was signed to the Broncos practice squad on October 8, 2024.
