= 2021 Dallas Cowboys season =

Sports season

- Owner: Jerry Jones
- General manager: Jerry Jones
- Head coach: Mike McCarthy
- Offensive coordinator: Kellen Moore
- Defensive coordinator: Dan Quinn
- Home stadium: AT&T Stadium

Results
- Record: 12–5
- Division place: 1st NFC East
- Playoffs: Lost Wild Card Playoffs (vs. 49ers) 17–23
- All-Pros: 4: RG Zack Martin (1st team); LB Micah Parsons (1st team); CB Trevon Diggs (1st team); P Bryan Anger (2nd team)
- Pro Bowlers: 6: WR CeeDee Lamb; T Tyron Smith; G Zack Martin; MLB Micah Parsons; CB Trevon Diggs; P Bryan Anger

Uniform
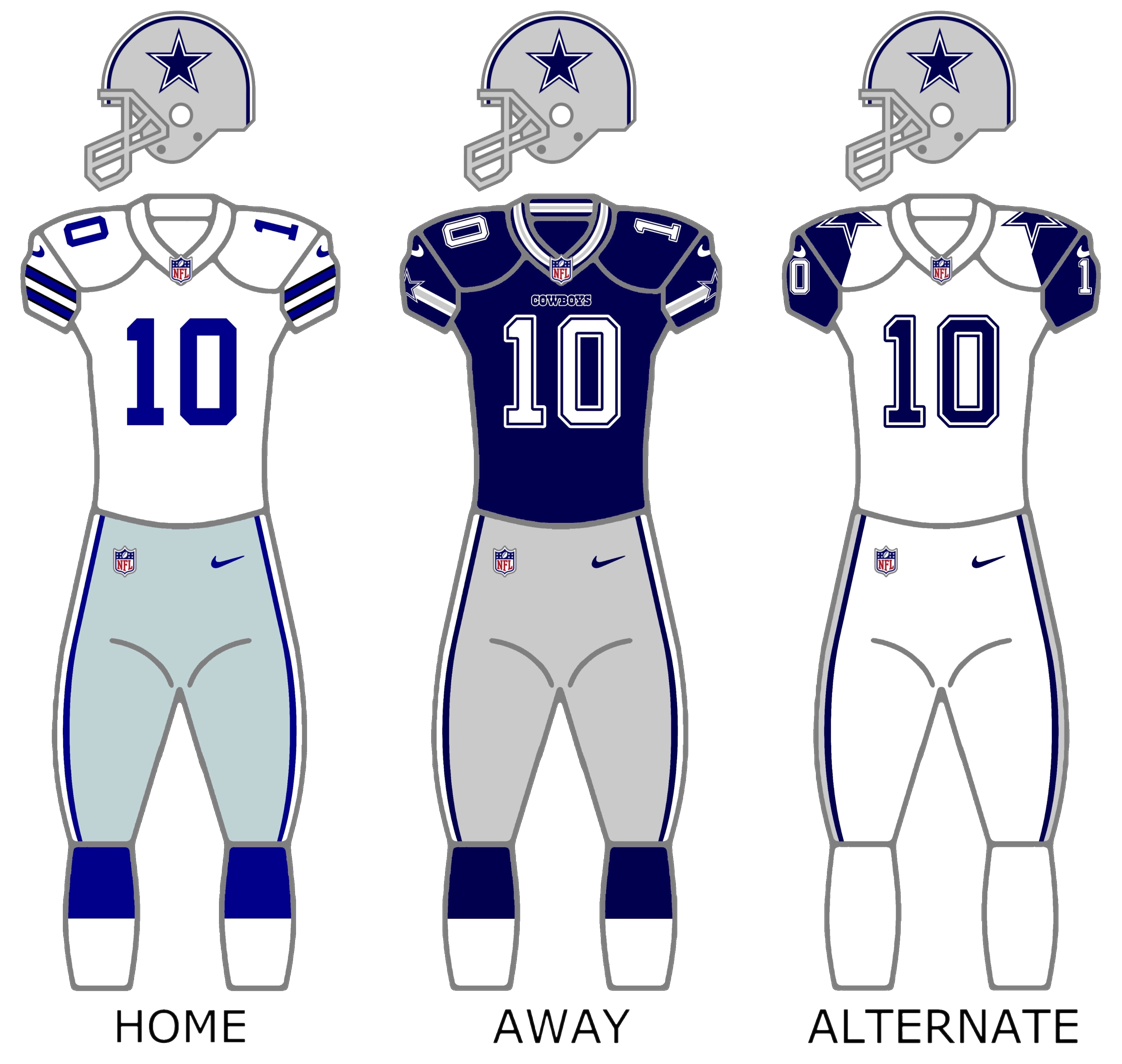

The 2021 season was the Dallas Cowboys' 62nd season in the National Football League (NFL), their 33rd under the ownership of Jerry Jones, and their 13th playing home games at AT&T Stadium.

For the first time since 2004, long-time long snapper L. P. Ladouceur was not on the opening day roster, as he was not re-signed during free agency. This was also the first time since 2010 that long-time punter Chris Jones was not on the opening day roster, as he was released on March 17, 2021. To further add to the notable departures, for the first time since 2011, defensive lineman Tyrone Crawford was not on the opening day roster, as he announced his retirement on March 25, 2021. Additionally, for the first time since 2009, linebacker Sean Lee was not on the opening day roster, as he announced his retirement on April 26, 2021.

With their Week 10 win against the Atlanta Falcons, the Cowboys improved on their 6–10 record from the previous season. With their Week 14 win against the Washington Football Team, the Cowboys clinched their first winning season since 2018, and with the San Francisco 49ers' Week 16 loss to the Tennessee Titans, the Cowboys clinched their first playoff berth also since 2018. Following a Denver Broncos' loss to the Las Vegas Raiders, the Cowboys clinched the NFC East, based on strength-of-victory tiebreakers; this was their first division title since 2018. They swept the NFC East for the first time since 1998. The Cowboys' strong offense finished the year with 530 points, the most in the league, and a team record. But despite high expectations, the Cowboys lost in the wild card round of the playoffs to the San Francisco 49ers 23–17.

On July 2, 2021, the Cowboys were announced to be featured on HBO's Hard Knocks for the third time in franchise history.

== Offseason ==
=== Signings ===
| Position | Player | Age | 2020 team | Contract |
|---|---|---|---|---|
| RB | Corey Clement | 27 | Philadelphia Eagles | 1 year, $990,000 |
| TE | Jeremy Sprinkle | 27 | Washington Football Team | 1 year, $987,500 |
| OT | Ty Nsekhe | 36 | Buffalo Bills | 1 year, $1.75 million |
| DE | Brent Urban | 30 | Chicago Bears | 1 year, $1.75 million |
| DT | Carlos Watkins | 28 | Houston Texans | 1 year, $1.75 million |
| LB | Tarell Basham | 27 | New York Jets | 2 years, $6.5 million |
| FS | Malik Hooker | 25 | Indianapolis Colts | 1 year, $920,000 |
| FS | Damontae Kazee | 28 | Atlanta Falcons | 1 year, $1.127 million |
| SS | Jayron Kearse | 27 | Detroit Lions | 1 year, $1.127 million |
| SS | Keanu Neal | 26 | Atlanta Falcons | 1 year, $5 million |
| P | Bryan Anger | 33 | Houston Texans | 1 year, $987,500 |
| LS | Jake McQuaide | 34 | Los Angeles Rams | 1 year, $1.2 million |

=== Re-signings ===
| Position | Player | Age | Contract |
|---|---|---|---|
| QB | Dak Prescott | 28 | 4 years, $160 million |
| WR | Noah Brown | 25 | 1 year, $1.127 million |
| WR | Malik Turner | 25 | 1 year, $920,000 |
| WR | Cedrick Wilson Jr. | 26 | 1 year, $2.1 million |
| CB | C. J. Goodwin | 31 | 2 years, $3.5 million |
| CB | Jourdan Lewis | 26 | 3 years, $16.5 million |

=== Departures ===
| Position | Player | Age | 2021 team |
|---|---|---|---|
| QB | Andy Dalton | 33 | Chicago Bears |
| QB | Garrett Gilbert | 30 | Washington Football Team |
| FB | Jamize Olawale | 32 | Unsigned |
| WR | Jon'Vea Johnson | 26 | Chicago Bears |
| WR | Chris Lacy | 25 | Chicago Bears |
| TE | Blake Bell | 30 | Kansas City Chiefs |
| TE | Cole Hikutini | 27 | New York Giants |
| OT | Cameron Erving | 29 | Carolina Panthers |
| OT | Brandon Knight | 24 | Baltimore Ravens |
| OT | Greg Senat | 27 | Indianapolis Colts |
| C | Marcus Henry | 28 | Arizona Cardinals |
| C | Joe Looney | 31 | Retired |
| C | Adam Redmond | 28 | Baltimore Ravens |
| DE | Ron'Dell Carter | 24 | Arizona Cardinals |
| DE | Tyrone Crawford | 32 | Retired |
| DE | Aldon Smith | 32 | Seattle Seahawks |
| DT | Eli Ankou | 27 | Buffalo Bills |
| DT | Antwaun Woods | 28 | Indianapolis Colts |
| LB | Sean Lee | 35 | Retired |
| LB | Justin March | 28 | Tennessee Titans |
| LB | Jaylon Smith | 26 | New York Giants |
| LB | Joe Thomas | 30 | Baltimore Ravens |
| CB | Chidobe Awuzie | 26 | Cincinnati Bengals |
| FS | Xavier Woods | 26 | Minnesota Vikings |
| P | Chris Jones | 32 | Unsigned |
| LS | L. P. Ladouceur | 40 | Unsigned |

== Draft ==
2021 Dallas Cowboys draft
| Round | Pick | Player | Position | College | Notes |
| 1 | 12 | Micah Parsons * | LB | Penn State | |
| 2 | 44 | Kelvin Joseph | CB | Kentucky | |
| 3 | 75 | Osa Odighizuwa | DT | UCLA | |
| 3 | 84 | Chauncey Golston | DE | Iowa | |
| 3 | 99 | Nahshon Wright | CB | Oregon State | Compensatory Pick |
| 4 | 115 | Jabril Cox | LB | LSU | |
| 4 | 138 | Josh Ball | OT | Marshall | Compensatory Pick |
| 5 | 178 | Simi Fehoko | WR | Stanford | Compensatory Pick |
| 6 | 192 | Quinton Bohanna | DT | Kentucky | |
| 6 | 227 | Israel Mukuamu | CB | South Carolina | Compensatory Pick |
| 7 | 238 | Matt Farniok | OG | Nebraska | |
Made roster † Pro Football Hall of Fame * Made at least one Pro Bowl during career

Notes

- The Cowboys were awarded one third-round, one fourth-round, one fifth-round and one sixth-round compensatory picks (99th, 138th, 178th and 227th overall).
- The Cowboys traded its first-round selection (10th overall) to Philadelphia in exchange for first- and third-round selections (12th and 84th overall).

== Staff ==
2021 Dallas Cowboys staff
| Front office: Owner/president/general manager – Jerry Jones; COO/Executive vice president/director of player personnel – Stephen Jones; Senior director of football operations/football administration – Todd Williams; Executive vice president/chief brand officer – Charlotte Jones Anderson; Executive vice president/Chief sales & marketing officer – Jerry Jones Jr.; Director of salary cap & player contracts – Adam Prasifka; Vice president player personnel – Will McClay; Director of team travel and logistics – Craig Glieber; Assistant director of football administration and technology – Jason McKay; Director of college scouting – Lionel Vital; Director of pro scouting – Alex Loomis; Assistant director of college scouting – Chris Hall; Advance scouting coordinator – Keith O'Quinn; Scout – Chris Vaughn; Scouting video coordinator – Rich Behm; Assistant to the head coach – Laura Fryar; Head coaches: Head coach – Mike McCarthy; Assistant head coach – Rob Davis; Offensive coaches: Offensive coordinator – Kellen Moore; Quarterbacks – Doug Nussmeier; Running backs – Skip Peete; Wide receivers – Adam Henry; Tight ends – Lunda Wells; Offensive line – Joe Philbin; Assistant offensive line – Jeff Blasko; Quality control/offense – Chase Haslett; Offensive assistant – Scott Tolzien; Quality control/analytics – Kyle Valero | Defensive coaches: Defensive coordinator – Dan Quinn; Defensive line – Aden Durde; Assistant defensive line – Leon Lett; Linebackers – Scott McCurley; Defensive backs – Al Harris; Secondaries/defensive pass game coordinator – Joe Whitt Jr.; Senior defensive assistant – George Edwards; Quality control/analytics – Ryan Feder; Quality control/defense – Cannon Matthews; Special teams coaches: Special teams coordinator – John Fassel; Assistant special teams – Matt Daniels; Video/analytics – Justin Ruud; Quality control/analytics – Eric Simonelli; Strength and conditioning: Strength and conditioning – Harold Nash; Assistant strength and conditioning – Cedric Smith; Assistant strength and conditioning – Kendall Smith |

== Rosters ==
=== Opening preseason roster ===
Dallas Cowboys 2021 opening preseason roster
| Quarterbacks: 7 Ben DiNucci; 3 Garrett Gilbert; 4 Dak Prescott; 10 Cooper Rush; Running backs: 34 Rico Dowdle; 21 Ezekiel Elliott; 37 JaQuan Hardy; 36 Brenden Knox; 45 Sewo Olonilua FB; 20 Tony Pollard; 46 Nick Ralston FB; Wide receivers: 85 Noah Brown; 16 Reggie Davis; 6 Johnnie Dixon; 83 Brennan Eagles; 81 Simi Fehoko; 13 Michael Gallup; 88 CeeDee Lamb; 14 Osirus Mitchell; 18 Aaron Parker; 80 Brandon Smith; 17 Malik Turner; 1 Cedrick Wilson Jr.; Tight ends: 47 Nick Eubanks; 89 Blake Jarwin; 49 Artayvious Lynn; 84 Sean McKeon; 86 Dalton Schultz; 87 Jeremy Sprinkle | Offensive linemen: 60 Isaac Alarcón T (Int.); 76 Josh Ball T; 63 Tyler Biadasz C; 71 La'el Collins T; 68 Matt Farniok C/G; 62 Braylon Jones C/G; 69 Brandon Knight G/T; 70 Zack Martin G; 66 Connor McGovern G; 79 Ty Nsekhe T; 67 Eric Smith T; 77 Tyron Smith T; 78 Terence Steele T; 52 Connor Williams G; Defensive linemen: 56 Bradlee Anae DE; 92 Dorance Armstrong DE; 93 Tarell Basham DE/OLB; 98 Quinton Bohanna DT; 97 Ron'Dell Carter DE; 58 Austin Faoliu DT; 96 Neville Gallimore DT; 94 Randy Gregory DE; 99 Justin Hamilton DT; 90 DeMarcus Lawrence DE; 75 Osa Odighizuwa DT; 95 Brent Urban DT; 91 Carlos Watkins DT/DE | Linebackers: 53 Francis Bernard MLB; 48 Jabril Cox OLB; 57 Luke Gifford MLB; 51 Anthony Hines III OLB; 43 Azur Kamara OLB/DE; 42 Keanu Neal OLB/SS; 11 Micah Parsons OLB/DE; 9 Jaylon Smith OLB; 55 Leighton Vander Esch MLB; Defensive backs: 30 Anthony Brown CB; 36 Kyron Brown CB; 33 Deante Burton CB; 31 Maurice Canady CB; 39 Tyler Coyle SS; 27 Trevon Diggs CB; 29 C. J. Goodwin CB; 28 Malik Hooker FS; 24 Kelvin Joseph CB; 35 Damontae Kazee FS; 32 Jayron Kearse SS; 26 Jourdan Lewis CB; 38 Israel Mukuamu FS/CB; 25 Steven Parker FS/SS; 41 Reggie Robinson CB/FS; 23 Darian Thompson SS; 6 Donovan Wilson SS; 40 Nahshon Wright CB; Special teams: 5 Bryan Anger P; 44 Jake McQuaide LS; 7 Hunter Niswander P/K | Reserve lists: 19 Amari Cooper WR (Active/PUP); 59 Chauncey Golston DE (Active/PUP); 72 Trysten Hill DT (Active/PUP); 65 Mitch Hyatt T (IR); 15 T. J. Vasher WR (Active/PUP); 2 Greg Zuerlein K (Active/PUP); 90 active (+1 exempt), 1 inactive |

=== Week one roster ===
Dallas Cowboys 2021 week one roster
| Quarterbacks: 15 Will Grier; 4 Dak Prescott; 10 Cooper Rush; Running backs: 32 Corey Clement; 21 Ezekiel Elliott; 20 Tony Pollard; Wide receivers: 85 Noah Brown; 19 Amari Cooper; 81 Simi Fehoko; 13 Michael Gallup; 88 CeeDee Lamb; 1 Cedrick Wilson Jr.; Tight ends: 89 Blake Jarwin; 86 Dalton Schultz | Offensive linemen: 63 Tyler Biadasz C; 71 La'el Collins T; 68 Matt Farniok C/G; 66 Connor McGovern G/C; 79 Ty Nsekhe T; 77 Tyron Smith T; 78 Terence Steele T; 52 Connor Williams G; Defensive linemen: 56 Bradlee Anae DE; 92 Dorance Armstrong DE; 93 Tarell Basham DE; 98 Quinton Bohanna DT; 59 Chauncey Golston DE; 94 Randy Gregory DE; 54 Azur Kamara DE/OLB; 90 DeMarcus Lawrence DE; 97 Osa Odighizuwa DT; 95 Brent Urban DT/DE; 91 Carlos Watkins DT/DE | Linebackers: 14 Jabril Cox OLB; 57 Luke Gifford OLB/MLB; 42 Keanu Neal MLB/OLB; 11 Micah Parsons OLB/DE; 9 Jaylon Smith MLB/OLB; 55 Leighton Vander Esch OLB/MLB; Defensive backs: 30 Anthony Brown CB; 31 Maurice Canady CB; 7 Trevon Diggs CB; 29 C. J. Goodwin CB; 28 Malik Hooker FS; 18 Damontae Kazee FS; 27 Jayron Kearse SS; 26 Jourdan Lewis CB; 38 Israel Mukuamu FS/CB; 23 Darian Thompson SS (Elevated); 6 Donovan Wilson SS; 25 Nahshon Wright CB; Special teams: 5 Bryan Anger P; 44 Jake McQuaide LS; 2 Greg Zuerlein K | Reserve lists: 75 Josh Ball T (IR); 53 Francis Bernard MLB (IR); 34 Rico Dowdle RB (IR); 96 Neville Gallimore DT (IR); 72 Trysten Hill DT (PUP); 65 Mitch Hyatt T (IR); 24 Kelvin Joseph CB (IR); 69 Brandon Knight G/T (COVID-19); 70 Zack Martin G (COVID-19); 84 Sean McKeon TE (IR); -- Hunter Niswander P/K (IR); 45 Sewo Olonilua FB (IR); 41 Reggie Robinson CB (IR); 17 Malik Turner WR (IR); -- T. J. Vasher WR (NF-Inj.); Practice squad: 60 Isaac Alarcón G/T (Int.); 36 Kyron Brown CB; 49 Ian Bunting TE; 33 Deante Burton CB; 76 Aviante Collins T; 39 Tyler Coyle FS; 3 Ben DiNucci QB; 58 Austin Faoliu DT; 99 Justin Hamilton DT; 37 JaQuan Hardy RB; 62 Braylon Jones G/C; 16 Osirus Mitchell WR; 46 Nick Ralston FB; 80 Brandon Smith WR; 51 Breeland Speaks DE; 87 Jeremy Sprinkle TE; 54 active, 15 inactive, 15 practice squad (+1 exempt) |

=== Final roster ===
2021 Dallas Cowboys roster
| Quarterbacks (QB): 4 Dak Prescott; 10 Cooper Rush; Running backs (RB): 32 Corey Clement; 21 Ezekiel Elliott; 20 Tony Pollard; Wide receivers (WR): 85 Noah Brown; 19 Amari Cooper; 81 Simi Fehoko; 88 CeeDee Lamb; 17 Malik Turner; 1 Cedrick Wilson Jr.; Tight ends (TE): 89 Blake Jarwin; 84 Sean McKeon; 86 Dalton Schultz; 87 Jeremy Sprinkle | Offensive linemen (OL): 63 Tyler Biadasz C; 71 La'el Collins T; 68 Matt Farniok C; 70 Zack Martin G; 66 Connor McGovern G; 79 Ty Nsekhe T; 77 Tyron Smith T; 78 Terence Steele T; 52 Connor Williams G; Defensive linemen (DL): 92 Dorance Armstrong DE; 93 Tarell Basham DE; 98 Quinton Bohanna DT; 96 Neville Gallimore DT; 59 Chauncey Golston DE; 94 Randy Gregory DE; 72 Trysten Hill DT; 90 DeMarcus Lawrence DE; 97 Osa Odighizuwa DT; 91 Carlos Watkins DT | Linebackers (LB): 53 Francis Bernard MLB; 57 Luke Gifford OLB; 42 Keanu Neal OLB; 11 Micah Parsons OLB; 55 Leighton Vander Esch MLB; Defensive backs (DB): 30 Anthony Brown CB; 31 Maurice Canady CB; 7 Trevon Diggs CB; 29 C. J. Goodwin CB; 28 Malik Hooker FS/SS; 24 Kelvin Joseph CB; 18 Damontae Kazee FS; 27 Jayron Kearse SS; 26 Jourdan Lewis CB; 6 Donovan Wilson FS/SS; 25 Nahshon Wright CB; Special teams (ST): 5 Bryan Anger P; 44 Jake McQuaide LS; 2 Greg Zuerlein K | Practice squad: 60 Isaac Alarcón T (IPP); 56 Bradlee Anae DE; 51 Devante Bond OLB; 73 Josiah Bronson DT; 36 Kyron Brown CB; 49 Ian Bunting TE; 76 Aviante Collins T; 39 Tyler Coyle FS; 3 Ben DiNucci QB; 58 Austin Faoliu DT; 83 Robert Foster WR; 37 JaQuan Hardy RB; 62 Braylon Jones G; 46 Nick Ralston FB; 80 Brandon Smith WR; 43 Ito Smith RB; 23 Darian Thompson SS; Reserve: 75 Josh Ball T (IR); 14 Jabril Cox OLB (IR); 34 Rico Dowdle RB (IR); 13 Michael Gallup WR (IR); 15 Will Grier QB (IR); 65 Mitch Hyatt T (IR); 38 Israel Mukuamu SS (IR); -- Hunter Niswander P (IR); 45 Sewo Olonilua FB (IR); 41 Reggie Robinson CB (IR); 95 Brent Urban DT (IR); 15 T. J. Vasher WR (NF-Inj.); Rookies in italics 53 active, 12 reserve, 16 practice squad (1 exempt) |

== Preseason ==
On February 15, the NFL announced that the Cowboys would face the Pittsburgh Steelers in the Pro Football Hall of Fame Game on Thursday, August 5, at Tom Benson Hall of Fame Stadium in Canton, Ohio. The game kicked off at 7:00 p.m. CDT, and was televised by Fox. The Cowboys were represented by head coach Jimmy Johnson and safety Cliff Harris. The Cowboys and Steelers were scheduled to play in the 2020 Hall of Fame game; however, the game, the annual Hall of Fame enshrinement, along with the entire 2020 preseason, were cancelled due to the COVID-19 pandemic, and the Hall of Fame game between the Cowboys and Steelers was rescheduled for 2021.

The remainder of the Cowboys' preseason opponents are listed below; the schedule was announced on May 13.

| Week | Date | Opponent | Result | Record | Venue | Recap |
|---|---|---|---|---|---|---|
| HOF | August 5 | vs. Pittsburgh Steelers | L 3–16 | 0–1 | Tom Benson Hall of Fame Stadium | Recap |
| 1 | August 13 | at Arizona Cardinals | L 16–19 | 0–2 | State Farm Stadium | Recap |
| 2 | August 21 | Houston Texans | L 14–20 | 0–3 | AT&T Stadium | Recap |
| 3 | August 29 | Jacksonville Jaguars | L 14–34 | 0–4 | AT&T Stadium | Recap |

== Regular season ==
=== Schedule ===
The Cowboys' 2021 schedule was announced on May 12.

| Week | Date | Opponent | Result | Record | Venue | Recap |
|---|---|---|---|---|---|---|
| 1 | September 9 | at Tampa Bay Buccaneers | **L** 29–31 | 0–1 | Raymond James Stadium | Recap |
| 2 | September 19 | at Los Angeles Chargers | **W** 20–17 | 1–1 | SoFi Stadium | Recap |
| 3 | September 27 | **Philadelphia Eagles** | **W** 41–21 | 2–1 | AT&T Stadium | Recap |
| 4 | October 3 | Carolina Panthers | **W** 36–28 | 3–1 | AT&T Stadium | Recap |
| 5 | October 10 | **New York Giants** | **W** 44–20 | 4–1 | AT&T Stadium | Recap |
| 6 | October 17 | at New England Patriots | **W** 35–29 (OT) | 5–1 | Gillette Stadium | Recap |
| 7 | Bye | | | | | |
| 8 | October 31 | at Minnesota Vikings | **W** 20–16 | 6–1 | U.S. Bank Stadium | Recap |
| 9 | November 7 | Denver Broncos | **L** 16–30 | 6–2 | AT&T Stadium | Recap |
| 10 | November 14 | Atlanta Falcons | **W** 43–3 | 7–2 | AT&T Stadium | Recap |
| 11 | November 21 | at Kansas City Chiefs | **L** 9–19 | 7–3 | Arrowhead Stadium | Recap |
| 12 | November 25 | Las Vegas Raiders | **L** 33–36 (OT) | 7–4 | AT&T Stadium | Recap |
| 13 | December 2 | at New Orleans Saints | **W** 27–17 | 8–4 | Caesars Superdome | Recap |
| 14 | December 12 | at **Washington Football Team** | **W** 27–20 | 9–4 | FedExField | Recap |
| 15 | December 19 | at **New York Giants** | **W** 21–6 | 10–4 | MetLife Stadium | Recap |
| 16 | December 26 | **Washington Football Team** | **W** 56–14 | 11–4 | AT&T Stadium | Recap |
| 17 | January 2 | Arizona Cardinals | **L** 22–25 | 11–5 | AT&T Stadium | Recap |
| 18 | January 8 | at **Philadelphia Eagles** | **W** 51–26 | 12–5 | Lincoln Financial Field | Recap |

Note: Intra-division opponents are in bold text.

=== Game summaries ===
==== Week 1: at Tampa Bay Buccaneers ====
Week 1: Dallas Cowboys at Tampa Bay Buccaneers – Game summary

| Quarter | 1 | 2 | 3 | 4 | Total |
|---|---|---|---|---|---|
| Cowboys | 7 | 9 | 10 | 3 | **29** |
| **Buccaneers** | 7 | 14 | 7 | 3 | **31** |

at Raymond James Stadium, Tampa, Florida

- Date: September 9
- Game time: 8:20 p.m. EDT/7:20 p.m. CDT
- Game weather: Cloudy, 81 °F (27 °C)
- Game attendance: 65,566
- Referee: Shawn Hochuli
- TV announcers (NBC/Peacock): Al Michaels, Cris Collinsworth, Michele Tafoya and Terry McAulay
- Recap, Game Book

Game information

**First quarter**

- TB – Chris Godwin 5-yard pass from Tom Brady (Ryan Succop kick), 5:23. Buccaneers 7–0. **Drive: 9 plays, 94 yards, 4:09**
- DAL – CeeDee Lamb 22-yard pass from Dak Prescott (Greg Zuerlein kick), 1:35. Tied 7–7. **Drive: 7 plays, 75 yards, 3:48**

**Second quarter**

- TB – Rob Gronkowski 2-yard pass from Tom Brady (Ryan Succop kick), 9:48. Buccaneers 14–7. **Drive: 6 plays, 50 yards, 2:53**
- DAL – Amari Cooper 5-yard pass from Dak Prescott (kick failed), 4:12. Buccaneers 14–13. **Drive: 5 plays, 27 yards, 2:08**
- DAL – Greg Zuerlein 35-yard field goal, 3:16. Cowboys 16–14. **Drive: 4 plays, 4 yards, 0:52**
- TB – Antonio Brown 47-yard pass from Tom Brady (Ryan Succop kick), 2:38. Buccaneers 21–16. **Drive: 2 plays, 57 yards, 0:38**

**Third quarter**

- DAL – Greg Zuerlein 21-yard field goal, 9:15. Buccaneers 21–19. **Drive: 13 plays, 72 yards, 5:45**
- TB – Rob Gronkowski 11-yard pass from Tom Brady (Ryan Succop kick), 6:23. Buccaneers 28–19. **Drive: 4 plays, 35 yards, 2:08**
- DAL – Amari Cooper 21-yard pass from Dak Prescott (Greg Zuerlein kick), 0:33. Buccaneers 28–26. **Drive: 10 plays, 75 yards, 5:50**

**Fourth quarter**

- DAL – Greg Zuerlein 48-yard field goal, 1:29. Cowboys 29–28. **Drive: 11 plays, 60 yards, 3:28**
- TB – Ryan Succop 36-yard field goal, 0:02. Buccaneers 31–29. **Drive: 11 plays, 57 yards, 1:22**

**Top passers**

- DAL – Dak Prescott – 42/58, 403 yards, 3 TD, INT
- TB – Tom Brady – 32/50, 379 yards, 4 TD, 2 INT

**Top rushers**

- DAL – Ezekiel Elliott – 11 rushes, 33 yards
- TB – Leonard Fournette – 9 rushes, 32 yards

**Top receivers**

- DAL – Amari Cooper – 13 receptions, 139 yards, 2 TD
- TB – Antonio Brown – 5 receptions, 121 yards, TD

Dak Prescott played his first game since he suffered compound fracture and dislocation injuries to his right ankle during a Week 5 game against the Giants the previous season. The Cowboys defense forced four turnovers but Greg Zuerlein missed crucial field goals, including a 60-yarder and an extra point. The Cowboys would fall to 0–1. This was the only time this season that the Cowboys had a lead at one point but ended up losing the game.

==== Week 2: at Los Angeles Chargers ====
Week 2: Dallas Cowboys at Los Angeles Chargers – Game summary

| Quarter | 1 | 2 | 3 | 4 | Total |
|---|---|---|---|---|---|
| **Cowboys** | 14 | 0 | 0 | 6 | **20** |
| Chargers | 3 | 8 | 3 | 3 | **17** |

at SoFi Stadium, Inglewood, California

- Date: September 19
- Game time: 3:25 p.m. CDT/1:25 p.m. PDT
- Game weather: None (retractable roof closed)
- Game attendance: 70,240
- Referee: Tony Corrente
- TV announcers (CBS): Jim Nantz, Tony Romo, Tracy Wolfson and Gene Steratore
- Recap, Game Book

Game information

**First quarter**

- DAL – Tony Pollard 4-yard run (Greg Zuerlein kick), 8:09. Cowboys 7–0. **Drive: 15 plays, 78 yards, 6:51.**
- LAC – Tristan Vizcaino 46-yard field goal, 3:32. Cowboys 7–3. **Drive: 5 plays, 17 yards, 2:24.**
- DAL – Ezekiel Elliott 5-yard run (Greg Zuerlein kick), 0:17. Cowboys 14–3. **Drive: 7 plays, 75 yards, 3:15.**

**Second quarter**

- LAC – Mike Williams 12-yard pass from Justin Herbert (Austin Ekeler run), 9:49. Cowboys 14–11. **Drive: 10 plays, 75 yards, 5:28.**

**Third quarter**

- LAC – Tristan Vizcaino 32-yard field goal, 9:22. Tied 14–14. **Drive: 13 plays, 61 yards, 5:38.**

**Fourth quarter**

- DAL – Greg Zuerlein 34-yard field goal, 10:25. Cowboys 17–14. **Drive: 10 plays, 64 yards, 4:40.**
- LAC – Tristan Vizcaino 29-yard field goal, 3:54. Tied 17–17. **Drive: 12 plays, 64 yards, 6:31.**
- DAL – Greg Zuerlein 56-yard field goal, 0:00. Cowboys 20–17. **Drive: 11 plays, 49 yards, 3:54.**

**Top passers**

- DAL – Dak Prescott – 23/27, 237 yards, INT
- LAC – Justin Herbert – 31/41, 338 yards, TD, 2 INT

**Top rushers**

- DAL – Tony Pollard – 13 rushes, 109 yards, TD
- LAC – Austin Ekeler – 9 rushes, 54 yards

**Top receivers**

- DAL – CeeDee Lamb – 8 receptions, 81 yards
- LAC – Keenan Allen – 4 receptions, 108 yards

The Cowboys started the game with a 14–3 lead, from touchdown runs by Tony Pollard and Ezekiel Elliott. The Chargers later tied the game. The Cowboys and Chargers each scored a field goal in their next scoring drives. In the last seconds of the game, the Cowboys marched down the field to the Chargers' 38-yard line. Greg Zuerlein kicked a 56-yard field goal as time expired to give Dallas a crucial win. The win improved the Cowboys to 1–1. This was the Cowboys' first win over the Chargers since 2005.

==== Week 3: vs. Philadelphia Eagles ====
Week 3: Philadelphia Eagles at Dallas Cowboys – Game summary

| Quarter | 1 | 2 | 3 | 4 | Total |
|---|---|---|---|---|---|
| Eagles | 7 | 0 | 7 | 7 | **21** |
| **Cowboys** | 14 | 6 | 7 | 14 | **41** |

at AT&T Stadium, Arlington, Texas

- Date: September 27
- Game time: 7:15 p.m. CDT
- Game weather: 84 °F (29 °C) (retractable roof open)
- Game attendance: 93,267
- Referee: Brad Rogers
- TV announcers (ESPN): Steve Levy, Brian Griese, Louis Riddick, Lisa Salters and John Parry
- Recap, Game Book

Game information

**First quarter**

- DAL – Ezekiel Elliott 1-yard run (Greg Zuerlein kick), 11:47. Cowboys 7–0. **Drive: 6 plays, 75 yards, 3:13.**
- PHI – Fletcher Cox fumble recovery in end zone (Jake Elliott kick), 9:57. Tied 7–7.
- DAL – Dalton Schultz 19-yard pass from Dak Prescott (Greg Zuerlein kick), 1:31. Cowboys 14–7. **Drive: 6 plays, 50 yards, 3:06.**

**Second quarter**

- DAL – Ezekiel Elliott 3-yard run (kick failed), 7:10. Cowboys 20–7. **Drive: 13 plays, 65 yards, 7:50.**

**Third quarter**

- DAL – Trevon Diggs 59-yard interception return (Greg Zuerlein kick), 14:07. Cowboys 27–7.
- PHI – Zach Ertz 3-yard pass from Jalen Hurts (Jake Elliott kick), 7:08. Cowboys 27–14. **Drive: 8 plays, 90 yards, 3:55.**

**Fourth quarter**

- DAL – Cedrick Wilson Jr. 2-yard pass from Dak Prescott (Greg Zuerlein kick), 11:26. Cowboys 34–14. **Drive: 12 plays, 61 yards, 6:12.**
- DAL – Dalton Schultz 22-yard pass from Dak Prescott (Greg Zuerlein kick), 6:56. Cowboys 41–14. **Drive: 3 plays, 31 yards, 1:20.**
- PHI – Greg Ward 15-yard pass from Jalen Hurts (Jake Elliott kick), 3:09. Cowboys 41–21. **Drive: 7 plays, 75 yards, 3:47.**

**Top passers**

- PHI – Jalen Hurts – 25/39, 326 yards, 2 TD, 2 INT
- DAL – Dak Prescott – 21/26, 238 yards, 3 TD

**Top rushers**

- PHI – Jalen Hurts – 9 rushes, 35 yards
- DAL – Ezekiel Elliott – 17 rushes, 95 yards, 2 TD

**Top receivers**

- PHI – Dallas Goedert – 2 receptions, 66 yards
- DAL – Dalton Schultz – 6 receptions, 80 yards, 2 TD

The Cowboys continued their home streak against the Eagles. Despite Dak Prescott's early hiccup by fumbling to allow the Eagles to score, Prescott responded by leading his team to torch the Eagles defense. Trevon Diggs recorded a pick-six off Jalen Hurts to tighten the Cowboys' lead. It was the first time since Week 8 of 2017 that the Cowboys recorded a pick-six. With the win, the Cowboys improved to 2–1.

==== Week 4: vs. Carolina Panthers ====
Week 4: Carolina Panthers at Dallas Cowboys – Game summary

| Quarter | 1 | 2 | 3 | 4 | Total |
|---|---|---|---|---|---|
| Panthers | 7 | 7 | 0 | 14 | **28** |
| **Cowboys** | 7 | 6 | 20 | 3 | **36** |

at AT&T Stadium, Arlington, Texas

- Date: October 3
- Game time: 12:00 p.m. CDT
- Game weather: None (retractable roof closed)
- Game attendance: 93,262
- Referee: Jerome Boger
- TV announcers (Fox): Kevin Burkhardt, Greg Olsen and Pam Oliver
- Recap, Game Book

Game information

**First quarter**

- DAL – Ezekiel Elliott 1-yard run (Greg Zuerlein kick), 7:27. Cowboys 7–0. **Drive: 9 plays, 70 yards, 4:40.**
- CAR – Sam Darnold 1-yard run (Zane Gonzalez kick), 2:41. Tied 7–7. **Drive: 9 plays, 75 yards, 4:46.**

**Second quarter**

- DAL – Blake Jarwin 18-yard pass from Dak Prescott (pass failed), 14:09. Cowboys 13–7. **Drive: 9 plays, 75 yards, 3:32.**
- CAR – Sam Darnold 11-yard run (Zane Gonzalez kick), 7:02. Panthers 14–13. **Drive: 13 plays, 75 yards, 7:07.**

**Third quarter**

- DAL – Amari Cooper 35-yard pass from Dak Prescott (Greg Zuerlein kick), 10:49. Cowboys 20–14. **Drive: 4 plays, 56 yards, 2:00.**
- DAL – Dalton Schultz 6-yard pass from Dak Prescott (pass failed), 7:21. Cowboys 26–14. **Drive: 4 plays, 66 yards, 1:49.**
- DAL – Cedrick Wilson Jr. 23-yard pass from Dak Prescott (Greg Zuerlein kick), 2:17. Cowboys 33–14. **Drive: 3 plays, 37 yards, 1:20.**

**Fourth quarter**

- DAL – Greg Zuerlein 37-yard field goal, 14:56. Cowboys 36–14. **Drive: 4 plays, 9 yards, 1:26.**
- CAR – D. J. Moore 6-yard pass from Sam Darnold (Zane Gonzalez kick), 8:58. Cowboys 36–21. **Drive: 10 plays, 75 yards, 5:58.**
- CAR – D. J. Moore 8-yard pass from Sam Darnold (Zane Gonzalez kick), 4:31. Cowboys 36–28. **Drive: 7 plays, 80 yards, 2:18.**

**Top passers**

- CAR – Sam Darnold – 26/39, 301 yards, 2 TD, 2 INT
- DAL – Dak Prescott – 14/22, 188 yards, 4 TD

**Top rushers**

- CAR – Chuba Hubbard – 13 rushes, 57 yards
- DAL – Ezekiel Elliott – 20 rushes, 143 yards, TD

**Top receivers**

- CAR – D. J. Moore – 8 receptions, 113 yards, 2 TD
- DAL – Amari Cooper – 3 receptions, 69 yards, TD

The Cowboys continued to roll. The Cowboys trailed 14–13 at halftime, but things significantly turned around for them in the second half. The third quarter began with Panthers' kicker Zane Gonzalez missing a field goal try, which the Cowboys took advantage by marching down the field to score a touchdown on the next drive. The Cowboys scored 23 unanswered points to take a 36–14 lead. Trevon Diggs recorded two interceptions off Panthers' Sam Darnold, giving Diggs a recorded 5 interceptions in the first 4 games. The Panthers scored the final 14 points, but the Cowboys picked up a first down in the last minutes to run out the clock. This win improved the Cowboys to 3–1. This was the Cowboys' first win over the Panthers since 2012.

==== Week 5: vs. New York Giants ====
Week 5: New York Giants at Dallas Cowboys – Game summary

| Quarter | 1 | 2 | 3 | 4 | Total |
|---|---|---|---|---|---|
| Giants | 0 | 10 | 3 | 7 | **20** |
| **Cowboys** | 3 | 14 | 10 | 17 | **44** |

at AT&T Stadium, Arlington, Texas

- Date: October 10
- Game time: 3:25 p.m. CDT
- Game weather: None (retractable roof closed)
- Game attendance: 93,476
- Referee: John Hussey
- TV announcers (Fox): Joe Buck, Troy Aikman, Erin Andrews, and Tom Rinaldi
- Recap, Game Book

Game information

**First quarter**

- DAL – Greg Zuerlein 31-yard field goal, 6:17. Cowboys 3–0. **Drive: 10 plays, 44 yards, 4:30.**

**Second quarter**

- DAL – CeeDee Lamb 49-yard pass from Dak Prescott (Greg Zuerlein kick), 11:59. Cowboys 10–0. **Drive: 4 plays, 65 yards, 1:59.**
- NYG – Graham Gano 51-yard field goal, 10:10. Cowboys 10–3. **Drive: 7 plays, 42 yards, 1:49.**
- NYG – Devontae Booker 1-yard run (Graham Gano kick), 2:51. Tied 10–10. **Drive: 12 plays, 88 yards, 5:51.**
- DAL – Amari Cooper 24-yard pass from Dak Prescott (Greg Zuerlein kick), 0:36. Cowboys 17–10. **Drive: 8 plays, 75 yards, 2:15.**

**Third quarter**

- NYG – Graham Gano 51-yard field goal, 11:14. Cowboys 17–13. **Drive: 7 plays, 42 yards, 3:46.**
- DAL – Ezekiel Elliott 4-yard pass from Dak Prescott (Greg Zuerlein kick), 7:11. Cowboys 24–13. **Drive: 10 plays, 75 yards, 4:03.**
- DAL – Greg Zuerlein 38-yard field goal, 2:02. Cowboys 27–13. **Drive: 8 plays, 39 yards, 4:55.**

**Fourth quarter**

- DAL – Ezekiel Elliott 13-yard run (Greg Zuerlein kick), 7:34. Cowboys 34–13. **Drive: 9 plays, 98 yards, 4:48.**
- NYG – Devontae Booker 3-yard pass from Mike Glennon (Graham Gano kick), 3:17. Cowboys 34–20. **Drive: 11 plays, 75 yards, 4:17.**
- DAL – Greg Zuerlein 31-yard field goal, 1:53. Cowboys 37–20. **Drive: 8 plays, 33 yards, 1:24.**
- DAL – Anthony Brown 45-yard interception return (Greg Zuerlein kick), 1:28. Cowboys 44–20.

**Top passers**

- NYG – Mike Glennon – 16/25, 196 yards, TD, 2 INT
- DAL – Dak Prescott – 22/32, 302 yards, 3 TD, INT

**Top rushers**

- NYG – Devontae Booker – 16 rushes, 42 yards, TD
- DAL – Ezekiel Elliott – 21 rushes, 110 yards, TD

**Top receivers**

- NYG – Kadarius Toney – 10 receptions, 189 yards
- DAL – CeeDee Lamb – 4 receptions, 84 yards, TD

Dak Prescott and the Cowboys played their second consecutive Week 5 home game against the Giants. Unlike the previous season's matchup, Dak Prescott finished the game without suffering an injury. The game began with Dak Prescott throwing an interception and losing a fumble, neither turnover of which the Cowboys would allow the Giants to score. The Cowboys never once trailed despite allowing New York to tie the game. After this, the game was all Dallas. The Cowboys scored two more takeaways, one of which was a pick six collected by Anthony Brown to seal the win for the Cowboys. This win improved the Cowboys to 4–1. This was the first time since 2018 that they won 4 or more consecutive games.

==== Week 6: at New England Patriots ====
Week 6: Dallas Cowboys at New England Patriots – Game summary

| Quarter | 1 | 2 | 3 | 4 | OT | Total |
|---|---|---|---|---|---|---|
| **Cowboys** | 7 | 3 | 7 | 12 | 6 | **35** |
| Patriots | 14 | 0 | 0 | 15 | 0 | **29** |

at Gillette Stadium, Foxborough, Massachusetts

- Date: October 17
- Game time: 4:25 p.m. EDT/3:25 p.m. CDT
- Game weather: Partly cloudy, 61 °F (16 °C)
- Game attendance: 65,878
- Referee: Brad Allen
- TV announcers (CBS): Jim Nantz, Tony Romo, Tracy Wolfson and Gene Steratore
- Recap, Game Book

Game information

**First quarter**

- NE – Damien Harris 4-yard run (Nick Folk kick), 10:20. Patriots 7–0. **Drive: 3 plays, 34 yards, 1:41.**
- DAL – Blake Jarwin 1-yard pass from Dak Prescott (Greg Zuerlein kick), 6:43. Tied 7–7. **Drive: 7 plays, 75 yards, 3:37.**
- NE – Hunter Henry 20-yard pass from Mac Jones (Nick Folk kick), 4:50. Patriots 14–7. **Drive: 4 plays, 75 yards, 1:53.**

**Second quarter**

- DAL – Greg Zuerlein 30-yard field goal, 6:39. Patriots 14–10. **Drive: 9 plays, 40 yards, 3:26.**

**Third quarter**

- DAL – CeeDee Lamb 1-yard pass from Dak Prescott (Greg Zuerlein kick), 4:49. Cowboys 17–14. **Drive: 8 plays, 91 yards, 4:29.**

**Fourth quarter**

- DAL – Greg Zuerlein 45-yard field goal, 13:13. Cowboys 20–14. **Drive: 9 plays, 61 yards, 3:45.**
- NE – Rhamondre Stevenson 1-yard run (Nick Folk kick), 6:23. Patriots 21–20. **Drive: 13 plays, 75 yards, 6:50.**
- DAL – Trevon Diggs 42-yard interception return (pass failed), 2:27. Cowboys 26–21.
- NE – Kendrick Bourne 75-yard pass from Mac Jones (Mac Jones-Jakobi Meyers pass), 2:11. Patriots 29–26. **Drive: 1 play, 75 yards, 0:16.**
- DAL – Greg Zuerlein 49-yard field goal, 0:20. Tied 29–29. **Drive: 9 plays, 40 yards, 1:51.**

**Overtime**

- DAL – CeeDee Lamb 35-yard pass from Dak Prescott, 3:52. Cowboys 35–29.

**Top passers**

- DAL – Dak Prescott – 36/51, 445 yards, 3 TD, INT
- NE – Mac Jones – 15/21, 229 yards, 2 TD, INT

**Top rushers**

- DAL – Ezekiel Elliott – 17 rushes, 69 yards, TD
- NE – Damien Harris – 18 rushes, 101 yards, TD

**Top receivers**

- DAL – CeeDee Lamb – 9 receptions, 149 yards, 2 TD
- NE – Kendrick Bourne – 1 reception, 75 yards, TD

The Cowboys scored the 2,500th touchdown in franchise history with Dak Prescott's 1-yard pass to CeeDee Lamb in the third quarter to take their first lead of the game, their first touchdown against the Patriots since 2011. During overtime, the Cowboys forced a Patriots punt, putting the Cowboys in position to score. During the final play, Dak Prescott threw a game-winning touchdown pass to CeeDee Lamb to seal the Cowboys' win. With the win the Cowboys improved to 5–1, as well as getting their first win over the Patriots since 1996, and their first on the road since 1987.

==== Week 8: at Minnesota Vikings ====
Week 8: Dallas Cowboys at Minnesota Vikings – Game summary

| Quarter | 1 | 2 | 3 | 4 | Total |
|---|---|---|---|---|---|
| **Cowboys** | 0 | 3 | 10 | 7 | **20** |
| Vikings | 7 | 3 | 3 | 3 | **16** |

at U.S. Bank Stadium, Minneapolis, Minnesota

- Date: October 31
- Game time: 7:20 p.m. CDT
- Game weather: None (indoor stadium)
- Game attendance: 66,633
- Referee: Scott Novak
- TV announcers (NBC): Al Michaels, Cris Collinsworth, Michele Tafoya and Terry McAulay
- Recap, Game Book

Game information

**First quarter**

- MIN – Adam Thielen 20-yard pass from Kirk Cousins (Greg Joseph kick), 11:49. Vikings 7–0. **Drive: 7 plays, 75 yards, 3:11.**

**Second quarter**

- DAL – Greg Zuerlein 38-yard field goal, 6:09. Vikings 7–3. **Drive: 12 plays, 60 yards, 6:25.**
- MIN – Greg Joseph 45-yard field goal, 1:44. Vikings 10–3. **Drive: 11 plays, 49 yards, 4:25.**

**Third quarter**

- DAL – Cedrick Wilson Jr. 73-yard pass from Cooper Rush (Greg Zuerlein kick), 14:07. Tied 10–10. **Drive: 3 plays, 75 yards, 0:53.**
- MIN – Greg Joseph 40-yard field goal, 6:31. Vikings 13–10. **Drive: 7 plays, 33 yards, 3:01.**
- DAL – Greg Zuerlein 39-yard field goal, 0:04. Tied 13–13. **Drive: 5 plays, 51 yards, 2:07.**

**Fourth quarter**

- MIN – Greg Joseph 24-yard field goal, 2:51. Vikings 16–13. **Drive: 10 plays, 69 yards, 5:17.**
- DAL – Amari Cooper 5-yard pass from Cooper Rush (Greg Zuerlein kick), 0:51. Cowboys 20–16. **Drive: 8 plays, 75 yards, 2:00.**

**Top passers**

- DAL – Cooper Rush – 24/40, 325 yards, 2 TD, INT
- MIN – Kirk Cousins – 23/35, 184 yards, TD

**Top rushers**

- DAL – Ezekiel Elliott – 16 rushes, 50 yards
- MIN – Dalvin Cook – 18 rushes, 78 yards

**Top receivers**

- DAL – Amari Cooper – 8 receptions, 122 yards, TD
- MIN – Adam Thielen – 6 receptions, 78 yards, TD

Dak Prescott was declared inactive for the game due to a grade one calf strain he suffered in the New England game. Backup Cooper Rush got his first career start in place of Prescott. The Cowboys' defense allowed an opening-drive touchdown and was not able to collect any takeaways, but they gave the Vikings' offense a hard time all game and only allowed three field goals the rest of the game. The Cowboys won the game in the final minute when Cooper Rush connected with Amari Cooper for a five-yard touchdown pass. With the win, the Cowboys improved to 6–1. This was the Cowboys' second consecutive win over the Vikings, as well as the third at U.S. Bank Stadium. This was the first time the Cowboys won six in a row since 2016.

==== Week 9: vs. Denver Broncos ====
Week 9: Denver Broncos at Dallas Cowboys – Game summary

| Quarter | 1 | 2 | 3 | 4 | Total |
|---|---|---|---|---|---|
| **Broncos** | 6 | 10 | 3 | 11 | **30** |
| Cowboys | 0 | 0 | 0 | 16 | **16** |

at AT&T Stadium, Arlington, Texas

- Date: November 7
- Game time: 12:00 p.m. CST
- Game weather: None (retractable roof closed)
- Game attendance: 93,503
- Referee: Bill Vinovich
- TV announcers (Fox): Kevin Burkhardt, Greg Olsen and Pam Oliver
- Recap, Game Book

Game information

**First quarter**

- DEN – Melvin Gordon 3-yard run (kick failed), 1:48. Broncos 6–0. **Drive: 11 plays, 80 yards, 6:19.**

**Second quarter**

- DEN – Tim Patrick 44-yard pass from Teddy Bridgewater (Brandon McManus kick), 12:13. Broncos 13–0. **Drive: 6 plays, 80 yards, 2:47.**
- DEN – Brandon McManus 53-yard field goal, 3:41. Broncos 16–0. **Drive: 11 plays, 45 yards, 7:07.**

**Third quarter**

- DEN – Brandon McManus 27-yard field goal, 8:08. Broncos 19–0. **Drive: 10 plays, 72 yards, 4:35.**

**Fourth quarter**

- DEN – Teddy Bridgewater 1-yard run (Teddy Bridgewater-Courtland Sutton pass), 11:18. Broncos 27–0. **Drive: 13 plays, 85 yards, 7:30.**
- DEN – Brandon McManus 42-yard field goal, 6:32. Broncos 30–0. **Drive: 5 plays, 15 yards, 3:15.**
- DAL – Malik Turner 5-yard pass from Dak Prescott (Ezekiel Elliott run), 4:08. Broncos 30–8. **Drive: 9 plays, 75 yards, 2:24.**
- DAL – Malik Turner 4-yard pass from Dak Prescott (Ezekiel Elliott run), 0:55. Broncos 30–16. **Drive: 11 plays, 65 yards, 2:08.**

**Top passers**

- DEN – Teddy Bridgewater – 19/28, 249 yards, TD
- DAL – Dak Prescott – 19/39, 232 yards, 2 TD, INT

**Top rushers**

- DEN – Javonte Williams – 17 rushes, 111 yards
- DAL – Ezekiel Elliott – 10 rushes, 51 yards

**Top receivers**

- DEN – Tim Patrick – 4 receptions, 85 yards, TD
- DAL – Dalton Schultz – 4 receptions, 54 yards

The Cowboys returned home to face the Denver Broncos. Dallas entered the game as 10-point home favorites, seeking their first win against Denver since the 1995 season. However, the Cowboys' offense was stymied by the Broncos defense the entire game. The Cowboys recorded their second blocked punt of the season, but the Broncos recovered to retain possession. Dallas' only points came on two touchdowns to Malik Turner, but the outcome was already decided in favor of the Broncos. The 30–16 loss dropped the Cowboys to 6–2 on the season, and 0–7 in their last 7 matchups against the Broncos. Dallas never held a lead against Denver, and was held under twenty points, both firsts for the season.

==== Week 10: vs. Atlanta Falcons ====
Week 10: Atlanta Falcons at Dallas Cowboys – Game summary

| Quarter | 1 | 2 | 3 | 4 | Total |
|---|---|---|---|---|---|
| Falcons | 3 | 0 | 0 | 0 | **3** |
| **Cowboys** | 7 | 29 | 7 | 0 | **43** |

at AT&T Stadium, Arlington, Texas

- Date: November 14
- Game time: 12:00 p.m. CST
- Game weather: 66 °F (19 °C) (retractable roof open)
- Game attendance: 93,436
- Referee: Craig Wrolstad
- TV announcers (Fox): Kevin Burkhardt, Greg Olsen and Pam Oliver
- Recap, Game Book

Game information

**First quarter**

- DAL – CeeDee Lamb 13-yard pass from Dak Prescott (Lirim Hajrullahu kick), 11:42. Cowboys 7–0. **Drive: 8 plays, 73 yards, 3:18.**
- ATL – Younghoe Koo 35-yard field goal, 8:24. Cowboys 7–3. **Drive: 8 plays, 58 yards, 3:18.**

**Second quarter**

- DAL – Ezekiel Elliott 1-yard run (Lirim Hajrullahu kick), 13:24. Cowboys 14–3. **Drive: 12 plays, 68 yards, 5:41.**
- DAL – Ezekiel Elliott 2-yard run (Lirim Hajrullahu kick), 8:07. Cowboys 21–3. **Drive: 8 plays, 68 yards, 3:49.**
- DAL – CeeDee Lamb 9-yard pass from Dak Prescott (Lirim Hajrullahu kick), 1:10. Cowboys 28–3. **Drive: 10 plays, 59 yards, 4:38.**
- DAL – Nahshon Wright 8-yard return of blocked punt (Ezekiel Elliott run), 0:37. Cowboys 36–3.

**Third quarter**

- DAL – Dak Prescott 4-yard run (Lirim Hajrullahu kick), 0:31. Cowboys 43–3. **Drive: 9 plays, 47 yards, 0:31.**

**Fourth quarter**

- No scoring plays.

**Top passers**

- ATL – Matt Ryan – 9/21, 117 yards, 2 INT
- DAL – Dak Prescott – 24/31, 296 yards, 2 TD

**Top rushers**

- ATL – Wayne Gallman Jr. – 15 rushes, 55 yards
- DAL – Tony Pollard – 11 rushes, 42 yards

**Top receivers**

- ATL – Kyle Pitts – 4 receptions, 60 yards
- DAL – CeeDee Lamb – 6 receptions, 94 yards

The Cowboys rebounded in a considerable way. The Cowboys offense combined for 43 points off of 431 yards. The scoring began with CeeDee Lamb hauling in Dak Prescott's pass for a touchdown to give the Cowboys the early lead. The Falcons responded with a field goal for their lone scoring play of the game. Afterwards, the Cowboys put up 36 unanswered points, 29 of which came in the second quarter. Ezekiel Elliott scored two touchdown runs to extend Dallas' lead to 21–3, before Lamb caught his second touchdown to make it 28–3. The special teams would also contribute with Nahshon Wright returning a blocked punt for a touchdown. As the Cowboys led 36–3 at halftime, their defense intercepted the Falcons three times in as many drives. One of those interceptions was by Trevon Diggs, who had not intercepted a pass since Week 6 against the Patriots. With this win, the Cowboys improved to 7–2.

==== Week 11: at Kansas City Chiefs ====
Week 11: Dallas Cowboys at Kansas City Chiefs – Game summary

| Quarter | 1 | 2 | 3 | 4 | Total |
|---|---|---|---|---|---|
| Cowboys | 3 | 0 | 3 | 3 | **9** |
| **Chiefs** | 9 | 7 | 3 | 0 | **19** |

at Arrowhead Stadium, Kansas City, Missouri

- Date: November 21
- Game time: 3:25 p.m. CST
- Game weather: 58 °F (14 °C)
- Game attendance: 73,494
- Referee: John Hussey
- TV announcers (Fox): Joe Buck, Troy Aikman, Erin Andrews and Tom Rinaldi
- Recap, Game Book

Game information

**First quarter**

- KC – Travis Kelce 4-yard run (kick failed), 10:01. Chiefs 6–0. **Drive: 9 plays, 86 yards, 3:47.**
- KC – Harrison Butker 37-yard field goal, 7:55. Chiefs 9–0. **Drive: 4 plays, 3 yards, 0:58.**
- DAL – Greg Zuerlein 33-yard field goal, 2:50. Chiefs 9–3. **Drive: 10 plays, 60 yards, 5:05.**

**Second quarter**

- KC – Clyde Edwards-Helaire 1-yard run (Harrison Butker kick), 14:08. Chiefs 16–3. **Drive: 8 plays, 65 yards, 3:42.**

**Third quarter**

- DAL – Greg Zuerlein 30-yard field goal, 9:21. Chiefs 16–6. **Drive: 7 plays, 24 yards, 2:02.**
- KC – Harrison Butker 53-yard field goal, 2:36. Chiefs 19–6. **Drive: 7 plays, 41 yards, 3:13.**

**Fourth quarter**

- DAL – Greg Zuerlein 48-yard field goal, 12:52. Chiefs 19–9. **Drive: 9 plays, 45 yards, 4:44.**

**Top passers**

- DAL – Dak Prescott – 28/43, 216 yards, 2 INT
- KC – Patrick Mahomes – 23/37, 260 yards, INT

**Top rushers**

- DAL – Tony Pollard – 7 rushes, 50 yards
- KC – Clyde Edwards-Helaire – 12 rushes, 63 yards, TD

**Top receivers**

- DAL – Dalton Schultz – 6 receptions, 53 yards
- KC – Tyreek Hill – 9 receptions, 77 yards

Despite strong defensive play, the Cowboys offense could not keep pace with Patrick Mahomes and the Chiefs. The Cowboys noticed the absence of Amari Cooper, who was ruled out due to COVID-19 protocols. Cooper's absence would contribute largely to Dallas' subsequent struggles on offense, as they failed to score a single touchdown despite their defense holding Kansas City's high-powered offense under 20 points. The 19–9 loss dropped the Cowboys to 7–3. This was the Cowboys' only game of the season not scoring at least 10 points.

==== Week 12: vs. Las Vegas Raiders ====
Thanksgiving Day games

Week 12: Las Vegas Raiders at Dallas Cowboys – Game summary

| Quarter | 1 | 2 | 3 | 4 | OT | Total |
|---|---|---|---|---|---|---|
| **Raiders** | 14 | 3 | 10 | 6 | 3 | **36** |
| Cowboys | 6 | 7 | 6 | 14 | 0 | **33** |

at AT&T Stadium, Arlington, Texas

- Date: November 25
- Game time: 3:30 p.m. CST
- Game weather: None (retractable roof closed)
- Game attendance: 93,483
- Referee: Shawn Hochuli
- TV announcers (CBS): Jim Nantz, Tony Romo and Tracy Wolfson
- Recap, Game Book

Game information

**First quarter**

- LV – DeSean Jackson 56-yard pass from Derek Carr (Daniel Carlson kick), 11:45. Raiders 7–0. **Drive: 3 plays, 71 yards, 1:15.**
- DAL – Sean McKeon 10-yard pass from Dak Prescott (kick failed), 7:38. Raiders 7–6. **Drive: 9 plays, 75 yards, 4:07.**
- LV – Josh Jacobs 1-yard run (Daniel Carlson kick), 1:33. Raiders 14–6. **Drive: 8 plays, 60 yards, 3:44.**

**Second quarter**

- LV – Daniel Carlson 22-yard field goal, 8:46. Raiders 17–6. **Drive: 13 plays, 74 yards, 5:53.**
- DAL – Ezekiel Elliott 1-yard run (Greg Zuerlein kick), 0:25. Raiders 17–13. **Drive: 8 plays, 86 yards, 3:27.**

**Third quarter**

- LV – Marcus Mariota 3-yard run (Daniel Carlson kick), 7:13. Raiders 24–13. **Drive: 6 plays, 75 yards, 2:48.**
- DAL – Tony Pollard 100-yard kick return (run failed), 7:00. Raiders 24–19.
- LV – Daniel Carlson 46-yard field goal, 3:28. Raiders 27–19. **Drive: 9 plays, 48 yards, 3:32.**

**Fourth quarter**

- DAL – Greg Zuerlein 29-yard field goal, 12:00. Raiders 27–22. **Drive: 8 plays, 78 yards, 2:48.**
- LV – Daniel Carlson 30-yard field goal, 8:18. Raiders 30–22. **Drive: 6 plays, 63 yards, 3:42.**
- DAL – Dalton Schultz 32-yard pass from Dak Prescott (Dalton Schultz–Dak Prescott pass), 2:54. Tied 30–30. **Drive: 4 plays, 69 yards, 0:47.**
- LV – Daniel Carlson 56-yard field goal, 1:52. Raiders 33–30. **Drive: 5 plays, 37 yards, 1:02.**
- LV – Greg Zuerlein 45-yard field goal, 0:19. Tied 33–33. **Drive: 10 plays, 48 yards, 1:33.**

**Overtime**

- LV – Daniel Carlson 29-yard field goal, 4:28. Raiders 36–33. **Drive: 8 plays, 67 yards, 4:12.**

**Top passers**

- LV – Derek Carr – 24/39, 373 yards, TD
- DAL – Dak Prescott – 32/47, 375 yards, 2 TD

**Top rushers**

- LV – Josh Jacobs – 22 rushes, 87 yards, TD
- DAL – Tony Pollard – 10 rushes, 36 yards

**Top receivers**

- LV – Hunter Renfrow – 8 receptions, 134 yards
- DAL – Michael Gallup – 5 receptions, 106 yards

After their loss to the Chiefs, the Cowboys looked to win their first game on Thanksgiving since they beat the Washington Football Team in 2018, who were then known as the Redskins. The Cowboys were already in trouble after several pass interference plays. The Cowboys sent the game to overtime, but after a controversial pass interference call on Anthony Brown, they could not succeed at making a comeback. The Cowboys fell to 7–4, and lost their third consecutive game on Thanksgiving Day.

==== Week 13: at New Orleans Saints ====
Week 13: Dallas Cowboys at New Orleans Saints – Game summary

| Quarter | 1 | 2 | 3 | 4 | Total |
|---|---|---|---|---|---|
| **Cowboys** | 7 | 6 | 7 | 7 | **27** |
| Saints | 0 | 7 | 3 | 7 | **17** |

at Caesars Superdome, New Orleans, Louisiana

- Date: December 2
- Game time: 7:20 p.m. CST
- Game weather: None (indoor stadium)
- Game attendance: 69,170
- Referee: Brad Rogers
- TV announcers (Fox/NFLN/Prime Video): Joe Buck, Troy Aikman, Erin Andrews and Kristina Pink
- Recap, Game Book

Game information

**First quarter**

- DAL – Michael Gallup 1-yard pass from Dak Prescott (Greg Zuerlein kick), 0:59. Cowboys 7–0. **Drive: 6 plays, 80 yards, 3:16.**

**Second quarter**

- NO – Lil'Jordan Humphrey 24-yard pass from Taysom Hill (Brett Maher kick), 12:54. Tied 7–7. **Drive: 7 plays, 75 yards, 3:05.**
- DAL – Greg Zuerlein 55-yard field goal, 9:04. Cowboys 10–7. **Drive: 7 plays, 39 yards, 3:50.**
- DAL – Greg Zuerlein 34-yard field goal, 0:00. Cowboys 13–7. **Drive: 12 plays, 79 yards, 2:19.**

**Third quarter**

- NO – Brett Maher 42-yard field goal, 8:26. Cowboys 13–10. **Drive: 11 plays, 55 yards, 5:03.**
- DAL – Tony Pollard 58-yard run (Greg Zuerlein kick), 3:55. Cowboys 20–10. **Drive: 4 plays, 71 yards, 1:03.**

**Fourth quarter**

- DAL – Carlos Watkins 29-yard interception return (Greg Zuerlein kick), 2:52. Cowboys 27–10.
- NO – Deonte Harris 70-yard pass from Taysom Hill (Brett Maher kick), 2:32. Cowboys 27–17. **Drive: 2 plays, 70 yards, 0:20.**

**Top passers**

- DAL – Dak Prescott – 26/40, 238 yards, TD, INT
- NO – Taysom Hill – 19/41, 264 yards, 2 TD, 4 INT

**Top rushers**

- DAL – Tony Pollard – 7 rushes, 71 yards, TD
- NO – Taysom Hill – 11 rushes, 101 yards

**Top receivers**

- DAL – CeeDee Lamb – 7 receptions, 89 yards
- NO – Deonte Harris – 4 receptions, 96 yards, TD

With Mike McCarthy in COVID-19 protocols, Dan Quinn took the interim head coaching position in place of McCarthy. The Cowboys ended their losing streak against the Saints in New Orleans with the win, as well as improving to 8–4.

==== Week 14: at Washington Football Team ====
Week 14: Dallas Cowboys at Washington Football Team – Game summary

| Quarter | 1 | 2 | 3 | 4 | Total |
|---|---|---|---|---|---|
| **Cowboys** | 18 | 6 | 3 | 0 | **27** |
| Washington | 0 | 0 | 8 | 12 | **20** |

at FedExField, Landover, Maryland

- Date: December 12
- Game time: 1:00 p.m. EST/12:00 p.m. CST
- Game weather: Sunny, 48 °F (9 °C)
- Game attendance: 61,308
- Referee: Alex Kemp
- TV announcers (Fox): Kevin Burkhardt, Greg Olsen and Pam Oliver
- Recap, Game Book

Game information

**First quarter**

- DAL – Greg Zuerlein 35-yard field goal, 9:37. Cowboys 3–0. **Drive: 12 plays, 54 yards, 5:23.**
- DAL – Amari Cooper 7-yard pass from Dak Prescott (Ezekiel Elliott run), 3:42. Cowboys 11–0. **Drive: 5 plays, 41 yards, 1:44.**
- DAL – Dorance Armstrong 37-yard fumble return (Greg Zuerlein kick), 0:29. Cowboys 18–0.

**Second quarter**

- DAL – Greg Zuerlein 38-yard field goal, 4:58. Cowboys 21–0. **Drive: 11 plays, 61 yards, 5:23.**
- DAL – Greg Zuerlein 37-yard field goal, 0:15. Cowboys 24–0. **Drive: 12 plays, 58 yards, 1:59.**

**Third quarter**

- WAS – Cam Sims 43-yard pass from Taylor Heinicke (Taylor Heinicke run), 6:57. Cowboys 24–8. **Drive: 6 plays, 90 yards, 2:20.**
- DAL – Greg Zuerlein 29-yard field goal, 1:35. Cowboys 27–8. **Drive: 5 plays, 15 yards, 1:37.**

**Fourth quarter**

- WAS – Jonathan Williams 1-yard run (pass failed), 5:09. Cowboys 27–14. **Drive: 13 plays, 73 yards, 4:15.**
- WAS – Cole Holcomb 31-yard interception return (kick blocked), 4:13. Cowboys 27–20.

**Top passers**

- DAL – Dak Prescott – 22/39, 211 yards, TD, 2 INT
- WAS – Taylor Heinicke – 11/25, 122 yards, TD, INT

**Top rushers**

- DAL – Ezekiel Elliott – 12 rushes, 45 yards
- WAS – Antonio Gibson – 10 rushes, 36 yards

**Top receivers**

- DAL – CeeDee Lamb – 7 receptions, 61 yards
- WAS – Cam Sims – 3 receptions, 69 yards, TD

The Cowboys continued their road trip against the Washington Football Team. Dallas would jump out to a 24–0 lead by halftime. One of those scoring plays involved Micah Parsons forcing a fumble, which was recovered by Dorance Armstrong for a touchdown. In the second half, Washington would awaken from their slump and score three touchdowns of their own, including a pick-six by Cole Holcomb. However, Dallas was able to stave off the late rally and keep the game out of Washington's reach by forcing a game-ending fumble. The win improved the Cowboys to 9–4.

==== Week 15: at New York Giants ====
Week 15: Dallas Cowboys at New York Giants – Game summary

| Quarter | 1 | 2 | 3 | 4 | Total |
|---|---|---|---|---|---|
| **Cowboys** | 6 | 9 | 6 | 0 | **21** |
| Giants | 3 | 0 | 3 | 0 | **6** |

at MetLife Stadium, East Rutherford, New Jersey

- Date: December 19
- Game time: 1:00 p.m. EST/12:00 p.m. CST
- Game weather: Cloudy, 40 °F (4 °C)
- Game attendance: 77,413
- Referee: Jerome Boger
- TV announcers (Fox): Adam Amin, Mark Schlereth and Shannon Spake
- Recap, Game Book

Game information

**First quarter**

- DAL – Ezekiel Elliott 13-yard run (kick failed), 6:31. Cowboys 6–0. **Drive: 2 plays, 13 yards, 0:09.**
- NYG – Graham Gano 35-yard field goal, 0:37. Cowboys 6–3. **Drive: 11 plays, 58 yards, 5:54.**

**Second quarter**

- DAL – Greg Zuerlein 26-yard field goal, 10:30. Cowboys 9–3. **Drive: 10 plays, 58 yards, 5:07.**
- DAL – Greg Zuerlein 42-yard field goal, 1:39. Cowboys 12–3. **Drive: 16 plays, 68 yards, 6:37.**
- DAL – Greg Zuerlein 27-yard field goal, 0:00. Cowboys 15–3. **Drive: 6 plays, 37 yards, 0:41.**

**Third quarter**

- NYG – Graham Gano 42-yard field goal, 12:05. Cowboys 15–6. **Drive: 8 plays, 51 yards, 2:55.**
- DAL – Dalton Schultz 1-yard pass from Dak Prescott (kick failed), 1:57. Cowboys 21–6. **Drive: 5 plays, 29 yards, 2:28.**

**Fourth quarter**

- No scoring plays.

**Top passers**

- DAL – Dak Prescott – 28/37, 217 yards, TD
- NYG – Mike Glennon – 13/24, 99 yards, 3 INT

**Top rushers**

- DAL – Tony Pollard – 12 rushes, 74 yards
- NYG – Devontae Booker – 8 rushes, 74 yards

**Top receivers**

- DAL – Dalton Schultz – 8 receptions, 67 yards, TD
- NYG – Kenny Golladay – 3 receptions, 53 yards

The Cowboys continued their dominance against the Giants. The Cowboys defense continued to be superior to the Giants offense, as the Cowboys held the Giants without a touchdown. The win improved the Cowboys to 10–4. Several days later, the Cowboys clinched a postseason berth after the 49ers lost to the Titans.

==== Week 16: vs. Washington Football Team ====
Week 16: Washington Football Team at Dallas Cowboys – Game summary

| Quarter | 1 | 2 | 3 | 4 | Total |
|---|---|---|---|---|---|
| Washington | 0 | 7 | 0 | 7 | **14** |
| **Cowboys** | 21 | 21 | 7 | 7 | **56** |

at AT&T Stadium, Arlington, Texas

- Date: December 26
- Game time: 7:20 p.m. CST
- Game weather: None (retractable roof closed)
- Game attendance: 93,482
- Referee: Bill Vinovich
- TV announcers (NBC): Al Michaels, Cris Collinsworth, Michele Tafoya and Terry McAulay
- Recap, Game Book

Game information

**First quarter**

- DAL – Ezekiel Elliott 5-yard pass from Dak Prescott (Greg Zuerlein kick), 7:42. Cowboys 7–0. **Drive: 9 plays, 71 yards, 3:45.**
- DAL – Dalton Schultz 9-yard pass from Dak Prescott (Greg Zuerlein kick), 3:08. Cowboys 14–0. **Drive: 8 plays, 74 yards, 3:00.**
- DAL – DeMarcus Lawrence 40-yard interception return (Greg Zuerlein kick), 2:17. Cowboys 21–0.

**Second quarter**

- WAS – Antonio Gibson 8-yard pass from Taylor Heinicke (Joey Slye kick), 14:45. Cowboys 21–7. **Drive: 5 plays, 75 yards, 2:32.**
- DAL – Ezekiel Elliott 11-yard run (Greg Zuerlein kick), 10:34. Cowboys 28–7. **Drive: 8 plays, 75 yards, 4:11.**
- DAL – Terence Steele 1-yard pass from Dak Prescott (Greg Zuerlein kick), 2:31. Cowboys 35–7. **Drive: 9 plays, 80 yards, 3:58.**
- DAL – Amari Cooper 13-yard pass from Dak Prescott (Greg Zuerlein kick), 0:05. Cowboys 42–7. **Drive: 12 plays, 89 yards, 1:37.**

**Third quarter**

- DAL – Chauncey Golston blocked punt recovery in end zone (Greg Zuerlein kick), 6:06. Cowboys 49–7.

**Fourth quarter**

- DAL – Malik Turner 9-yard pass from Cooper Rush (Greg Zuerlein kick), 14:16. Cowboys 56–7. **Drive: 5 plays, 79 yards, 2:59.**
- WAS – John Bates 13-yard pass from Kyle Allen (Joey Slye kick), 2:46. Cowboys 56–14. **Drive: 12 plays, 61 yards, 7:02.**

**Top passers**

- WAS – Taylor Heinicke – 7/22, 121 yards, TD, 2 INT
- DAL – Dak Prescott – 28/39, 330 yards, 4 TD

**Top rushers**

- WAS – Jaret Patterson – 9 rushes, 33 yards
- DAL – Ezekiel Elliott – 9 rushes, 37 yards, TD

**Top receivers**

- WAS – Dyami Brown – 2 receptions, 53 yards
- DAL – Amari Copper – 7 receptions, 85 yards, TD

Having already clinched the NFC East after the Broncos lost to the Raiders, the Cowboys looked to add to their momentum as they returned home to play against the Washington Football Team. The Cowboys dominated the game in every way. Their defense continued to shine with an additional 2 takeaways, one of which was a pick six. Dak Prescott became the first quarterback in NFL history to throw at least one touchdown pass to a wide receiver, running back, offensive tackle, and a tight end, all in one game, with one touchdown pass going to running back Ezekiel Elliott, one touchdown pass going to wide receiver Amari Cooper, one touchdown pass going to offensive tackle Terence Steele, and one touchdown pass going to Dalton Schultz. The Cowboys scored their most points since 1980 when they romped the 49ers, 59–14. This win improved the Cowboys to 11–4 and swept Washington for the first time since 2019.

==== Week 17: vs. Arizona Cardinals ====
Week 17: Arizona Cardinals at Dallas Cowboys – Game summary

| Quarter | 1 | 2 | 3 | 4 | Total |
|---|---|---|---|---|---|
| **Cardinals** | 3 | 10 | 9 | 3 | **25** |
| Cowboys | 0 | 7 | 0 | 15 | **22** |

at AT&T Stadium, Arlington, Texas

- Date: January 2
- Game time: 3:25 p.m. CST
- Game weather: None (retractable roof closed)
- Game attendance: 93,459
- Referee: Scott Novak
- TV announcers (Fox): Joe Buck, Troy Aikman, Erin Andrews and Tom Rinaldi
- Recap, Game Book

Game information

**First quarter**

- ARI – Matt Prater 24-yard field goal, 7:46. Cardinals 3–0. **Drive: 9 plays, 78 yards, 3:12.**

**Second quarter**

- ARI – Antoine Wesley 1-yard pass from Kyler Murray (Matt Prater kick), 5:27. Cardinals 10–0. **Drive: 15 plays, 91 yards, 8:25.**
- DAL – Michael Gallup 21-yard pass from Dak Prescott (Greg Zuerlein kick), 1:25. Cardinals 10–7. **Drive: 11 plays, 77 yards, 4:02.**
- ARI – Matt Prater 53-yard field goal, 0:00. Cardinals 13–7. **Drive: 10 plays, 40 yards, 1:25.**

**Third quarter**

- ARI – Antoine Wesley 19-yard pass from Kyler Murray (pass failed), 9:39. Cardinals 19–7. **Drive: 8 plays, 75 yards, 5:21.**
- ARI – Matt Prater 26-yard field goal, 4:01. Cardinals 22–7. **Drive: 9 plays, 49 yards, 4:44.**

**Fourth quarter**

- DAL – Cedrick Wilson Jr. 2-yard pass from Dak Prescott (Greg Zuerlein kick), 13:49. Cardinals 22–14. **Drive: 8 plays, 31 yards, 2:52.**
- ARI – Matt Prater 38-yard field goal, 8:32. Cardinals 25–14. **Drive: 5 plays, 24 yards, 1:58.**
- DAL – Amari Cooper 4-yard pass from Dak Prescott (Dak Prescott–Cedrick Wilson Jr. pass), 4:42. Cardinals 25–22. **Drive: 8 plays, 75 yards, 3:50.**

**Top passers**

- ARI – Kyler Murray – 26/38, 263 yards, 2 TD
- DAL – Dak Prescott – 24/38, 226 yards, 3 TD

**Top rushers**

- ARI – Chase Edmonds – 18 rushes, 53 yards
- DAL – Dak Prescott – 5 rushes, 20 yards

**Top receivers**

- ARI – Christian Kirk – 6 receptions, 79 yards
- DAL – Dalton Schultz – 6 receptions, 54 yards

The Cowboys stayed home for the second straight week to take on the Arizona Cardinals. Dallas struggled in the first half and could not keep pace with Arizona. They later fought back in the fourth quarter to pull within 3 points, but a controversial fumble call ended the Cowboys' momentum. This loss dropped the Cowboys to 11–5 on the season.

Wide receiver Michael Gallup left the game with a knee injury in the second quarter after a touchdown reception. It was confirmed to be a torn ACL, ending his season.

==== Week 18: at Philadelphia Eagles ====
Week 18: Dallas Cowboys at Philadelphia Eagles – Game summary

| Quarter | 1 | 2 | 3 | 4 | Total |
|---|---|---|---|---|---|
| **Cowboys** | 10 | 20 | 0 | 21 | **51** |
| Eagles | 7 | 10 | 3 | 6 | **26** |

at Lincoln Financial Field, Philadelphia, Pennsylvania

- Date: January 8
- Game time: 8:15 p.m. EST/7:15 p.m. CST
- Game weather: Clear, 26 °F (−3 °C)
- Game attendance: 69,796
- Referee: Ronald Torbert
- TV announcers (ESPN/ABC/ESPN+): Steve Levy, Brian Griese, Louis Riddick, Lisa Salters, and John Parry
- Recap, Game Book

Game information

**First quarter**

- PHI – Tyree Jackson 3-yard pass from Gardner Minshew (Jake Elliott kick), 9:41. Eagles 7–0. **Drive: 11 plays, 75 yards, 5:19.**
- DAL – Cedrick Wilson Jr. 14-yard pass from Dak Prescott (Greg Zuerlein kick), 5:08. Tied 7–7. **Drive: 10 plays, 75 yards, 4:33.**
- DAL – Greg Zuerlein 48-yard field goal, 1:37. Cowboys 10–7. **Drive: 5 plays, 26 yards, 1:57.**

**Second quarter**

- PHI – Jake Elliott 38-yard field goal, 12:24. Tied 10–10. **Drive: 10 plays, 44 yards, 4:13.**
- DAL – Cedrick Wilson Jr. 24-yard pass from Dak Prescott (Greg Zuerlein kick), 8:07. Cowboys 17–10. **Drive: 7 plays, 74 yards, 4:17.**
- PHI – Kenneth Gainwell 7-yard run (Jake Elliott kick), 3:40. Tied 17–17. **Drive: 10 plays, 75 yards, 4:27.**
- DAL – Dalton Schultz 2-yard pass from Dak Prescott (kick failed), 1:45. Cowboys 23–17. **Drive: 8 plays, 75 yards, 1:55.**
- DAL – Dalton Schultz 9-yard pass from Dak Prescott (Greg Zuerlein kick), 0:05. Cowboys 30–17. **Drive: 4 plays, 43 yards, 0:19.**

**Third quarter**

- PHI – Jake Elliott 40-yard field goal, 5:58. Cowboys 30–20. **Drive: 15 plays, 53 yards, 6:41.**

**Fourth quarter**

- DAL – Corey Clement 8-yard pass from Dak Prescott (Greg Zuerlein kick), 14:33. Cowboys 37–20. **Drive: 14 plays, 84 yards, 6:25.**
- DAL – Ito Smith 4-yard run (Greg Zuerlein kick), 10:16. Cowboys 44–20. **Drive: 5 plays, 52 yards, 2:28.**
- DAL – JaQuan Hardy 22-yard run (Greg Zuerlein kick), 8:36. Cowboys 51–20. **Drive: 3 plays, 26 yards, 1:32.**
- PHI – Quez Watkins 36-yard pass from Gardner Minshew (pass failed), 1:50. Cowboys 51–26. **Drive: 14 plays, 75 yards, 6:46.**

**Top passers**

- DAL – Dak Prescott – 21/27, 295 yards, 5 TD
- PHI – Gardner Minshew – 19/33, 186 yards, 2 TD, INT

**Top rushers**

- DAL – Ezekiel Elliott – 18 rushes, 87 yards
- PHI – Kenneth Gainwell – 12 rushes, 78 yards, TD

**Top receivers**

- DAL – Cedrick Wilson Jr. – 5 receptions, 119 yards, 2 TD
- PHI – Quez Watkins – 5 receptions, 84 yards, TD

The Cowboys traveled to Philadelphia to play the backup-laden Eagles, who had also already clinched a playoff spot. Dak Prescott threw for 5 touchdowns, a career high. He also surpassed Tony Romo's single-season touchdown pass record. It was the first time in history the Cowboys would score 50+ points on the road. This was the first time since 1998 that the Cowboys completed a season sweep of the NFC East. The Cowboys finished the regular season 12–5 in the first ever 17-game NFL season.

=== Standings ===
==== Division ====
NFC East
| | W | L | T | PCT | DIV | CONF | PF | PA | STK |
|---|---|---|---|---|---|---|---|---|---|
| ^{(3)} Dallas Cowboys | 12 | 5 | 0 | .706 | 6–0 | 10–2 | 530 | 358 | W1 |
| ^{(7)} Philadelphia Eagles | 9 | 8 | 0 | .529 | 3–3 | 7–5 | 444 | 385 | L1 |
| Washington Football Team | 7 | 10 | 0 | .412 | 2–4 | 6–6 | 335 | 434 | W1 |
| New York Giants | 4 | 13 | 0 | .235 | 1–5 | 3–9 | 258 | 416 | L6 |

==== Conference ====
NFC
| # | Team | Division | W | L | T | PCT | DIV | CONF | SOS | SOV | STK |
|---|---|---|---|---|---|---|---|---|---|---|---|
**Division winners**
| 1 (Note: Green Bay finished ahead of Tampa Bay based on conference record (9–3 vs. 8–4), claiming the No. 1 seed.) | Green Bay Packers | North | 13 | 4 | 0 | .765 | 4–2 | 9–3 | .479 | .480 | L1 |
| 2 | Tampa Bay Buccaneers | South | 13 | 4 | 0 | .765 | 4–2 | 8–4 | .467 | .443 | W3 |
| 3 (Note: Dallas claimed the No. 3 seed over LA Rams based on conference record (10–2 vs. 8–4).) | Dallas Cowboys | East | 12 | 5 | 0 | .706 | 6–0 | 10–2 | .488 | .431 | W1 |
| 4 | Los Angeles Rams | West | 12 | 5 | 0 | .706 | 3–3 | 8–4 | .483 | .409 | L1 |
**Wild cards**
| 5 | Arizona Cardinals | West | 11 | 6 | 0 | .647 | 4–2 | 7–5 | .490 | .492 | L1 |
| 6 | San Francisco 49ers | West | 10 | 7 | 0 | .588 | 2–4 | 7–5 | .500 | .438 | W2 |
| 7 (Note: Philadelphia finished ahead of New Orleans based on head-to-head victory, claiming the 7th and final playoff spot.) | Philadelphia Eagles | East | 9 | 8 | 0 | .529 | 3–3 | 7–5 | .469 | .350 | L1 |
**Did not qualify for the postseason**
| 8 | New Orleans Saints | South | 9 | 8 | 0 | .529 | 4–2 | 7–5 | .512 | .516 | W2 |
| 9 | Minnesota Vikings | North | 8 | 9 | 0 | .471 | 4–2 | 6–6 | .507 | .434 | W1 |
| 10 (Note: Washington finished ahead of Atlanta and Seattle based on head-to-head victories.) | Washington Football Team | East | 7 | 10 | 0 | .412 | 2–4 | 6–6 | .529 | .420 | W1 |
| 11 (Note: Seattle finished ahead of Atlanta based on win percentage in common games (4–2 vs. 3–3 against: San Francisco, New Orleans, Jacksonville, Washington, and Detroit).) | Seattle Seahawks | West | 7 | 10 | 0 | .412 | 3–3 | 4–8 | .519 | .424 | W2 |
| 12 | Atlanta Falcons | South | 7 | 10 | 0 | .412 | 2–4 | 4–8 | .472 | .315 | L2 |
| 13 | Chicago Bears | North | 6 | 11 | 0 | .353 | 2–4 | 4–8 | .524 | .373 | L1 |
| 14 | Carolina Panthers | South | 5 | 12 | 0 | .294 | 2–4 | 3–9 | .509 | .412 | L7 |
| 15 | New York Giants | East | 4 | 13 | 0 | .235 | 1–5 | 3–9 | .536 | .485 | L6 |
| 16 | Detroit Lions | North | 3 | 13 | 1 | .206 | 2–4 | 3–9 | .528 | .627 | W1 |
**Tiebreakers** (Note: When breaking ties for three or more teams under the NFL's rules, they are first broken within divisions, then comparing only the highest-ranked remaining team from each division.)

== Postseason ==
| Round | Date | Opponent (seed) | Result | Record | Venue | Recap |
|---|---|---|---|---|---|---|
| Wild Card | January 16 | San Francisco 49ers (6) | L 17–23 | 0–1 | AT&T Stadium | Recap |

=== Game summaries ===
==== NFC Wild Card Playoffs: vs. (6) San Francisco 49ers ====
NFC Wild Card Playoffs: (6) San Francisco 49ers at (3) Dallas Cowboys – Game summary

| Quarter | 1 | 2 | 3 | 4 | Total |
|---|---|---|---|---|---|
| 49ers | 10 | 6 | 7 | 0 | 23 |
| Cowboys | 0 | 7 | 0 | 10 | 17 |

at AT&T Stadium, Arlington, Texas

- Date: January 16, 2022
- Game time: 3:30 p.m. CST
- Game weather: None (retractable roof closed)
- Game attendance: 93,470
- Referee: Alex Kemp
- TV announcers (CBS, Nickelodeon and Amazon Prime Video):
  - CBS: Jim Nantz, Tony Romo, Tracy Wolfson, and Jay Feely
  - Nickelodeon: Noah Eagle, Nate Burleson, Gabrielle Nevaeh Green, and Dylan Gilmer
  - Prime Video: Hannah Storm and Andrea Kremer
- Recap, Game Book

Game information

First quarter

- SF – Elijah Mitchell 4-yard run (Robbie Gould kick), 10:54. 49ers 7–0. Drive: 7 plays, 75 yards, 4:06.
- SF – Robbie Gould 53-yard field goal, 4:53. 49ers 10–0. Drive: 9 plays, 23 yards, 4:34.

Second quarter

- SF – Robbie Gould 40-yard field goal, 9:40. 49ers 13–0. Drive: 12 plays, 56 yards, 7:58.
- DAL – Amari Cooper 20-yard pass from Dak Prescott (Greg Zuerlein kick), 5:19. 49ers 13–7. Drive: 9 plays, 67 yards, 4:21.
- SF – Robbie Gould 52-yard field goal, 3:03. 49ers 16–7. Drive: 5 plays, 41 yards, 2:16.

Third quarter

- SF – Deebo Samuel 26-yard run (Robbie Gould kick), 5:50. 49ers 23–7. Drive: 1 play, 26 yards, 0:08.

Fourth quarter

- DAL – Greg Zuerlein 51-yard field goal, 11:53. 49ers 23–10. Drive: 11 plays, 37 yards, 4:41.
- DAL – Dak Prescott 5-yard run (Greg Zuerlein kick), 8:02. 49ers 23–17. Drive: 5 plays, 28 yards, 1:35.

Top passers

- SF – Jimmy Garoppolo – 16/25, 172 yards, INT
- DAL – Dak Prescott – 23/43, 254 yards, TD, INT

Top rushers

- SF – Elijah Mitchell – 27 rushes, 96 yards, TD
- DAL – Ezekiel Elliott – 12 rushes, 31 yards

Top receivers

- SF – Brandon Aiyuk – 5 receptions, 66 yards
- DAL – Dalton Schultz – 7 receptions, 89 yards

The Cowboys hosted the San Francisco 49ers for the Wild Card Playoffs. However, the Cowboys were plagued by miscues and penalties throughout the game, and a late fourth-quarter rally fell short in a heartbreaking loss. San Francisco scored first with a touchdown run by Elijah Mitchell on the game's opening drive, and built their lead to 23–7 by the start of the fourth quarter. Dallas started their rally with a long field goal by Greg Zuerlein, followed by a touchdown run by Dak Prescott. On the game's final drive, Prescott led the Cowboys deep into San Francisco territory, but with seconds remaining and no time-outs, he was stopped in bounds on a run up the middle as the game clock continued running. The Cowboys had a first down at the 49ers 24-yard line, but the clock expired before Prescott could stop it by spiking the ball, in part because members of the Cowboys offense unintentionally prevented the referee from touching the ball to officiate the start of the snap, ending the game and Dallas's season. The 23–17 loss marked the second time in their past three postseason appearances, and the seventh time in their past ten, that Dallas went one-and-done in the playoffs. The Cowboys finished the season with a total record of 12–6.

== Statistics ==
=== Team ===
| Category | Total yards | Yards per game | NFL rank (out of 32) |
|---|---|---|---|
| Passing offense | 4,800 | 282.4 | 2nd |
| Rushing offense | 2,119 | 124.6 | 9th |
| Total offense | 6,919 | 407.0 | 1st |
| Passing defense | 4,049 | 238.2 | 20th |
| Rushing defense | 1,918 | 112.8 | 16th |
| Total defense | 5,967 | 351.0 | 19th |

=== Individual ===
| Category | Player | Total yards |
Offense
| Passing | Dak Prescott | 4,449 |
| Rushing | Ezekiel Elliott | 1,002 |
| Receiving | CeeDee Lamb | 1,102 |
Defense
| Tackles (Solo) | Jayron Kearse | 67 |
| Sacks | Micah Parsons | 13 |
| Interceptions | Trevon Diggs | 11 |

Statistics correct as of the end of the 2021 NFL season
