= Jaquan =

- Gender: Male

Origin
- Region of origin: United States

Other names
- Variant form: JaQuan

Jaquan or JaQuan is a given name. Notable people with the given name include:

- JaQuan Bailey (born 1997), American football player
- Jaquan Brisker (born 1999), American football player
- JaQuan Hardy (born 1997), American football player
- Jaquan Johnson (born 1995), American football player
- JaQuan Lyle (born 1996), American basketball player
- Ja'Quan McMillian (born 2000), American football player
- Ja'Quan Sheppard (born 2000), American football player
