= Maurice Canady =

American football player (born 1994)

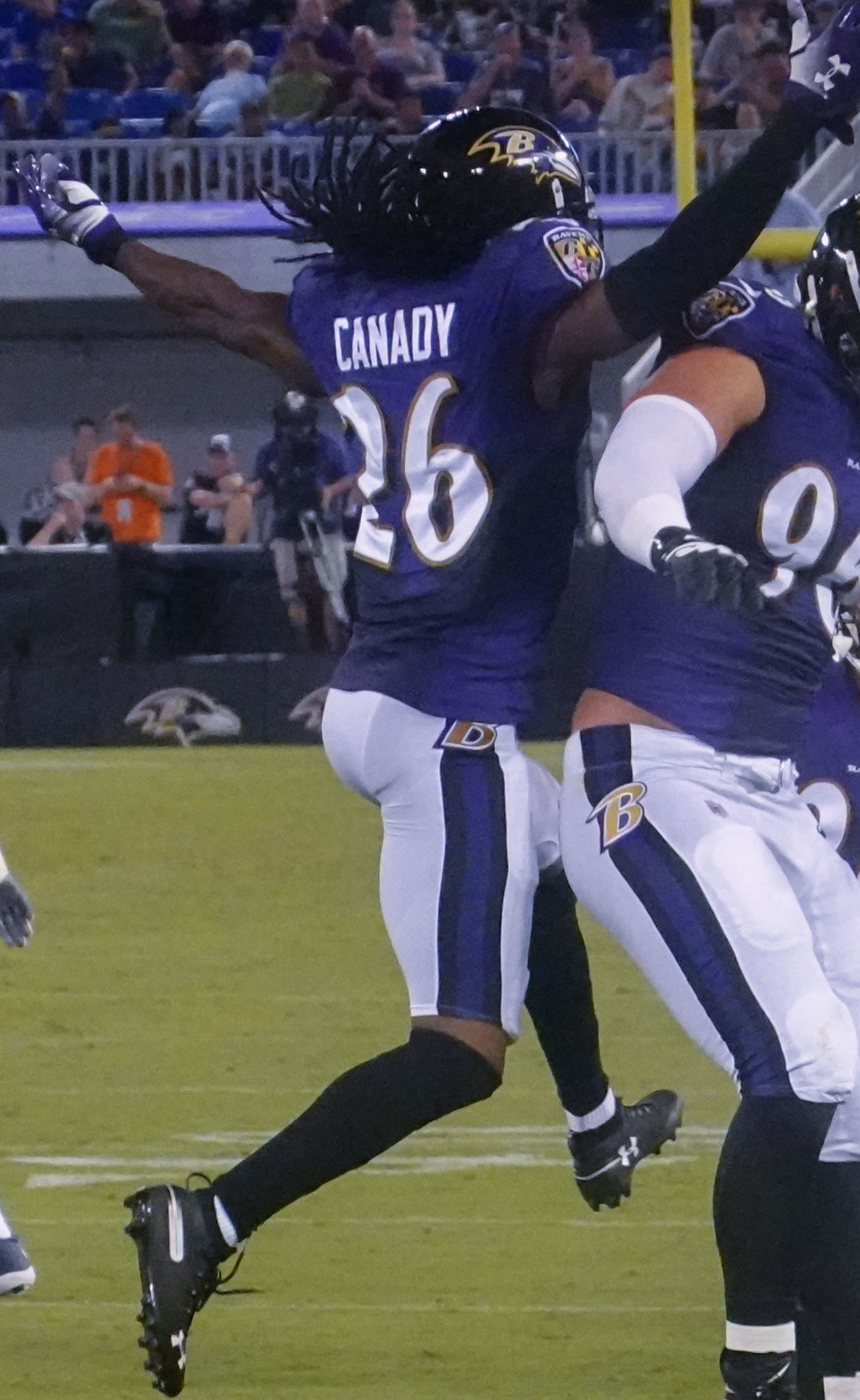
- Canady with the Baltimore Ravens in 2018

No. 39, 26, 37, 31
- Position: Cornerback

Personal information
- Born: May 26, 1994 (age 32); Richmond, Virginia, U.S.
- Listed height: 6 ft 1 in (1.85 m)
- Listed weight: 193 lb (88 kg)

Career information
- High school: Varina (Henrico, Virginia)
- College: Virginia
- NFL draft: 2016: 6th round, 209th overall pick

Career history
- Baltimore Ravens (2016–2019); New York Jets (2019); Dallas Cowboys (2020–2021); New York Giants (2022)*
- * Offseason or practice squad member only

Career NFL statistics
- Games played: 40
- Total tackles: 86
- Forced fumbles: 1
- Fumble recoveries: 1
- Pass deflections: 6
- Interceptions: 1
- Stats at Pro Football Reference

Maurice Canady (born May 26, 1994) is an American former professional football player who was a cornerback in the National Football League (NFL) for the Baltimore Ravens, New York Jets and Dallas Cowboys. He played college football for the Virginia Cavaliers.

== Early life ==
Canady attended Varina High School, where he played as a cornerback, wide receiver and quarterback.

As a senior, he tallied 704 passing yards, 1,090 rushing yards, 280 receiving yards, 10 pass breakups and one interception (returned for a touchdown). He received first-team All-district, All-Central Region and Touchdown Club of Richmond's Offensive Player of the Year honors.

== College career ==
Canady accepted a football scholarship from the University of Virginia. As a true freshman, he appeared in 11 games with 2 starts. He totaled 28 tackles, 2 interceptions, 3 pass breakups, one forced fumble and one fumble recovery. He was named the Atlantic Coast Conference Defensive Player of the Week after both of his starts (North Carolina State University and University of Miami).

As a sophomore, he started 8 games, registering a career-high 44 tackles, 2 sacks, 8 pass breakups (second on the team) and one forced fumble. He missed three games with an injury. He had 13 tackles against Brigham Young University.

As a junior, he started all 12 games, collecting 37 tackles (1.5 tackles for loss), 3 interceptions (tied for the team lead), 12 pass breakups (second in the conference), one forced fumble and one touchdown. He recorded the fourth-longest interception return for a touchdown (69-yard return) in school history against Kent State University.

As a senior, he started all 12 games, posting 39 tackles (3 for loss), one forced fumble and returned five punts for 126 yards with a touchdown. He had the fifth-longest punt return for a touchdown (74-yard return) in school history against the College of William & Mary.

== Professional career ==
Pre-draft measurables
Height	Weight	Arm length	Hand span	40-yard dash	20-yard shuttle	Three-cone drill	Vertical jump	Broad jump	Bench press
6 ft 1 in (1.85 m)	193 lb (88 kg)	31 5/8 in (0.80 m)	9 1/8 in (0.23 m)	4.49 s	4.09 s	7.03 s	38.0 in (0.97 m)	10 ft 4 in (3.15 m)	16 reps
All values from NFL Combine

=== Baltimore Ravens ===
Canady was selected by the Baltimore Ravens in the sixth round (209th overall) of the 2016 NFL draft. He was placed on injured reserve on October 6, 2016, with a hamstring injury.

On September 4, 2017, Canady was placed on injured reserve due to a knee injury suffered in training camp. He was activated off injured reserve to the active roster on November 3, 2017.

On September 17, 2018, Canady was placed on injured reserve with a thigh injury. He was activated off injured reserve on November 24, 2018.

On August 31, 2019, Canady was waived by the Ravens and was signed to the practice squad the next day. He was promoted to the active roster on September 14, 2019. In week 4 against the Cleveland Browns, Canady recorded his first career interception off Baker Mayfield in the 40–25 loss. He was released on November 5.

=== New York Jets ===
On November 6, 2019, Canady was claimed off waivers by the New York Jets.

=== Dallas Cowboys ===
Canady signed with the Dallas Cowboys on March 30, 2020. On July 27, 2020, Canady opted out of the 2020 season due to the COVID-19 pandemic.

Canady was placed on injured reserve on October 26, 2021, after suffering a concussion in Week 6. He was activated on December 25. He appeared in 8 games as a backup cornerback, making 5 defensive tackles and one special teams tackle. He wasn't re-signed after the season.

=== New York Giants ===
On May 18, 2022, Canady signed with the New York Giants. On July 26, 2022, Canady was waived.

== NFL career statistics ==
Year	Team	GP	GS	COMB	TOTAL	AST	SACK	FF	FR	FR YDS	FR TD	INT	YDS	AVG IR	LNG	IR TD	PD
2016	BAL	4	4	2	2	0	0.0	0	0	0	0	0	0	0.0	0	0	0
2017	BAL	8	8	27	26	5	0.0	0	0	0	0	0	0	0.0	0	0	1
2018	BAL	7	7	5	5	0	0.0	0	0	0	0	0	0	0.0	0	0	0
2019	BAL/NYJ	13	13	45	28	9	0.0	1	0	0	0	1	3	3.3	3	0	5
2021	DAL	6	6	3	4	0	0.0	0	0	0	0	0	0	0.0	0	0	0
Career		38	38	62	65	1	0.0	1	0	0	0	1	3	3.3	3	0	6
