= Terence Steele =

American football player (born 1997)

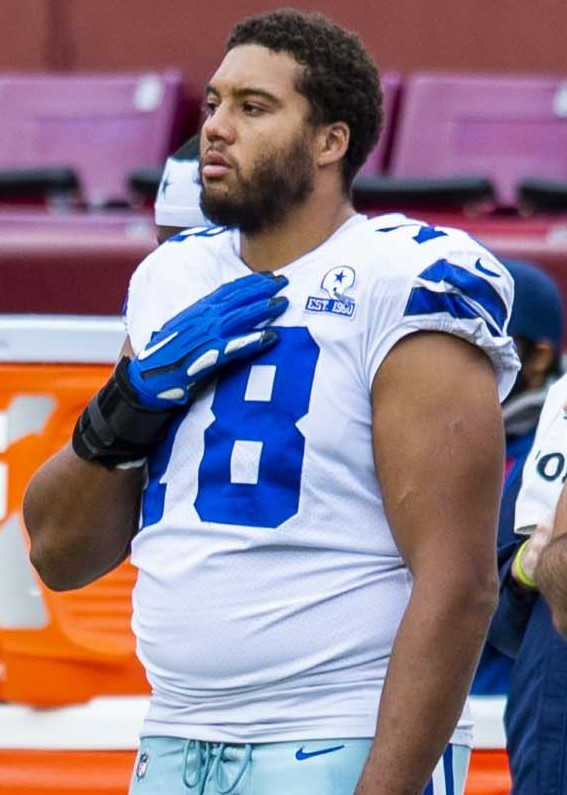
- Steele with the Dallas Cowboys in 2020

No. 78 – Dallas Cowboys
- Position: Offensive tackle
- Roster status: Active

Personal information
- Born: June 4, 1997 (age 29); San Antonio, Texas, U.S.
- Listed height: 6 ft 6 in (1.98 m)
- Listed weight: 320 lb (145 kg)

Career information
- High school: Byron P. Steele (Cibolo, Texas)
- College: Texas Tech (2015–2019)
- NFL draft: 2020: undrafted

Career history
- Dallas Cowboys (2020–present)

Career NFL statistics as of Week 3, 2026
- Games played: 99
- Games started: 94
- Receiving touchdowns: 1
- Stats at Pro Football Reference

Terence Steele (born June 4, 1997) is an American professional football offensive tackle for the Dallas Cowboys of the National Football League (NFL). He played college football for the Texas Tech Red Raiders.

== Early life ==
Steele attended Byron P. Steele II High School. As a senior, he was the starter at left tackle, receiving All-District 25-6A and San Antonio Express-News first team All-Area honors.

Steele was considered a three-star recruit, the No. 1,844 overall prospect, the No. 179 offensive tackle and the No. 239 overall player in Texas in his class, according to the average of the major recruiting services. He committed to Texas Tech over offers from BYU, North Texas and UTSA.

== College career ==
As a redshirt freshman, Steele played under future NFL head coach Kliff Kingsbury. He started the first 10 games at left tackle, before being moved to right tackle for the last two contests. Steele blocked for future NFL quarterback Patrick Mahomes, while contributing to the team leading the nation in passing yards and total offense. He was named to the All-Big 12 freshman team.

As a sophomore, Steele started all 13 games at right tackle, contributing to the team ranking in the top 25 nationally in passing yards (ninth), total offense (16th) and scoring (23rd).

As a junior, he started all 12 games at right tackle, contributing to the team ranking in the top 20 nationally in passing yards per game (third), total offense (12th), scoring (16th) and sacks allowed (sixth).

As a senior, Steele was forced to miss the first two games due to a preseason injury, breaking his streak of 37 consecutive starts. He started 10 games at right tackle and was part of an offensive line that allowed 18 sacks during his senior season. Steele finished his college career with 47 starts and received honorable-mention honors as All-Big 12 following his junior and senior seasons for the Red Raiders. At the end of the season, he participated in the 2020 Senior Bowl and the NFL Scouting Combine.

== Professional career ==
Pre-draft measurables
| Height | Weight | Arm length | Hand span | Wingspan | 40-yard dash | 10-yard split | 20-yard split | 20-yard shuttle | Vertical jump | Broad jump | Bench press |
|---|---|---|---|---|---|---|---|---|---|---|---|
| 6 ft 5 7/8 in (1.98 m) | 312 lb (142 kg) | 35 1/8 in (0.89 m) | 9 1/2 in (0.24 m) | 7 ft 1 1/2 in (2.17 m) | 5.03 s | 1.74 s | 2.92 s | 5.08 s | 27.5 in (0.70 m) | 8 ft 10 in (2.69 m) | 27 reps |
All values from NFL Combine

Steele was signed as an undrafted free agent by the Dallas Cowboys after the 2020 NFL draft on April 27.

=== 2020 season ===
Because of the season-ending injury to starting right tackle La'el Collins and backup Cameron Erving having to miss time with different injuries, Steele was pressed into the starting lineup for the Cowboys, becoming just the fourth offensive tackle in the Super Bowl era, and the ninth in league history, to start at least 14 contests as an undrafted rookie. In the season opener against the Los Angeles Rams, he was able to hold his own until giving up a crucial sack on the final drive, as the offense was attempting to tie the contest. In the third game, against the Seattle Seahawks, he was replaced in the third quarter with Zack Martin. In the fourth game, against the Cleveland Browns, he gave up a sack that caused a fumble, in what proved to be a game-changing play in the 38–49 loss. He was benched for the tenth game, against the Minnesota Vikings, with Martin taking over the right tackle position. In the eleventh game, against Washington, both Martin and Erving went down with injuries, so Steele was forced to start the rest of the season. Although he mostly struggled with his play, the team continued to start him and was able to show improvement in the final month. He played in all 16 games, with 14 starts.

=== 2021 season ===
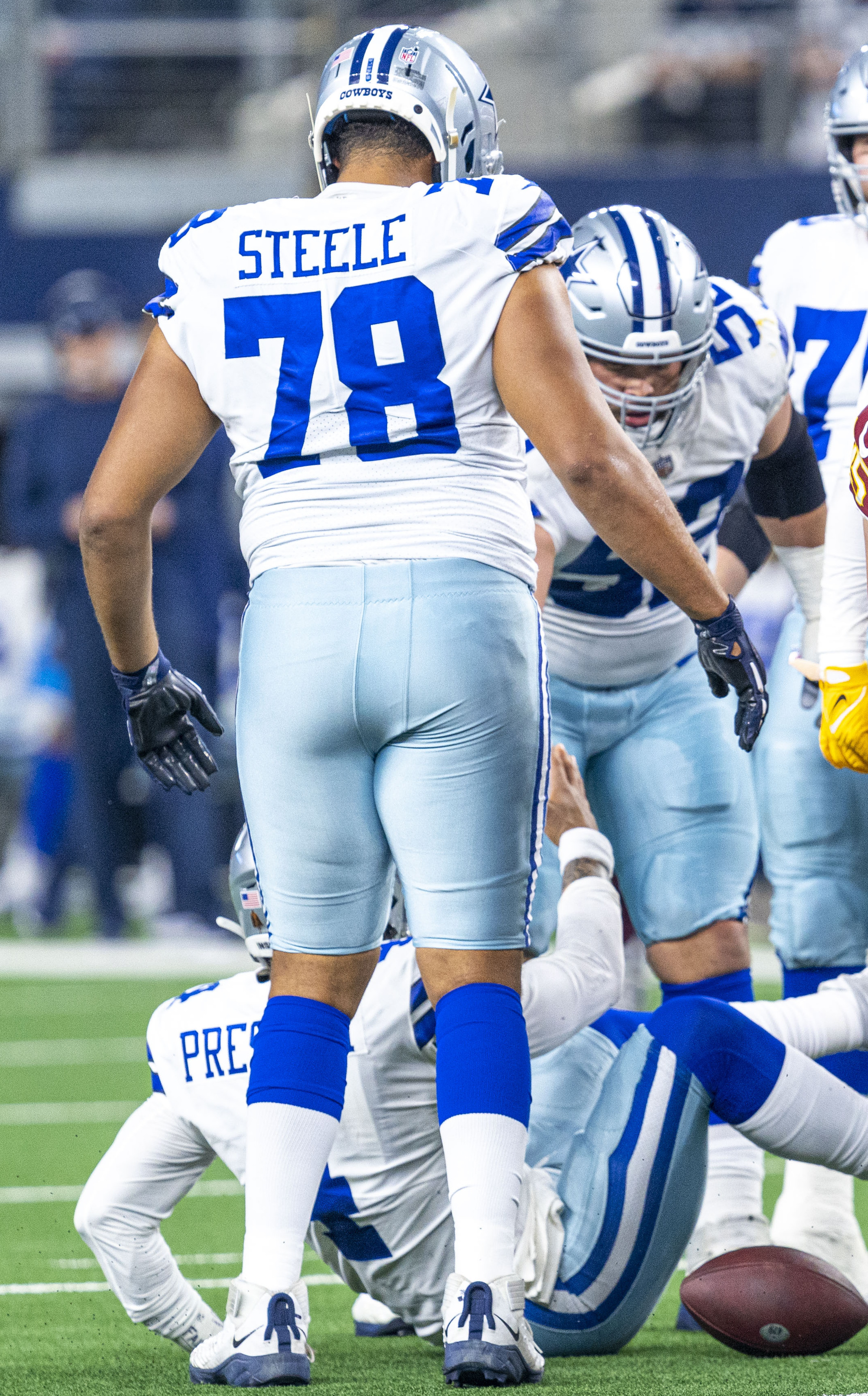
Steele with the Dallas Cowboys in 2021

As of November 28, 2021, Steele had started 10 games for the Dallas Cowboys during the 2021 season, including even after longtime starter Collins returned from suspension. From weeks 2–8, he started at right tackle, and then started three games at left tackle after Tyron Smith was injured. Steele missed the week 13 game after being placed on the COVID-19 list. On December 26 against the Washington Football Team, Steele reported as an eligible receiver and caught his first NFL touchdown from Dak Prescott.

=== 2022 season ===
In 2022, he started 13 games at right tackle. In Week 14 against the Houston Texans, Steele suffered a torn ACL and MCL in his left knee, forcing him to the Reserve/Injured list and ending his season. A combination of Jason Peters and Josh Ball replaced him in the starting lineup.

=== 2023 season ===
On September 3, 2023, Steele signed a five-year, $86.8 million contract extension with the Cowboys. He started all 17 games at right tackle for the first time in his career and was a part of the league's top scoring offense (29.9 points-per-game) and the fifth-best in yards-per-game (371.6). In Week 10 against the New York Giants, he contributed to the offense posting 640 total yards, the second most yards gained in a single-game in franchise history. Even though the team was upset in the Wild Card playoff game against the Green Bay Packers, he helped the offense gain 510 total (second in postseason team history) and 37 first downs (first in postseason team history).

=== 2024 season ===
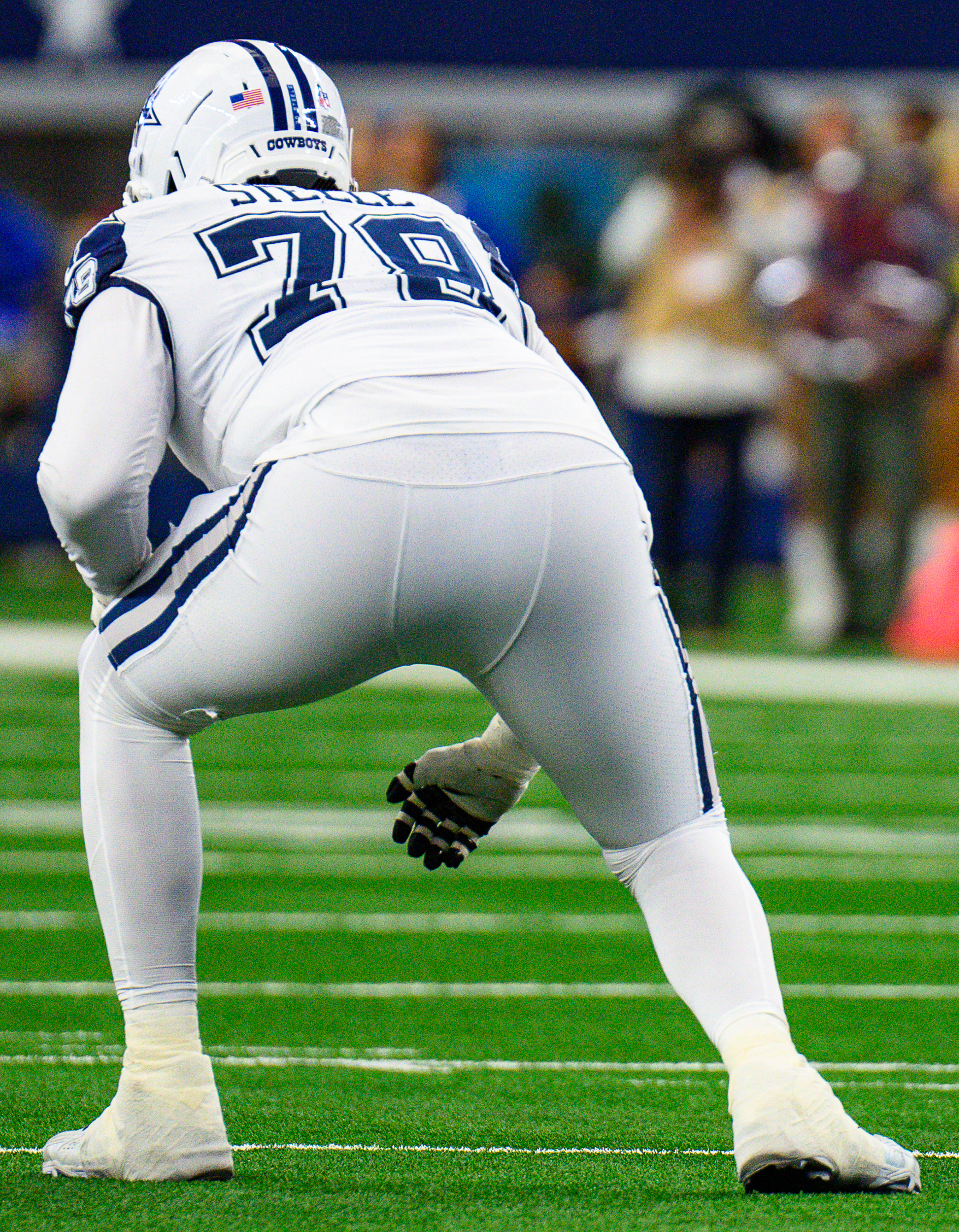
Steele with the Dallas Cowboys in 2025

In 2024, he started all 17 regular season games at right tackle and was the only Cowboy to play 100% of the offensive snaps on the season. He contributed to Rico Dowdle becoming the first undrafted free agent in team history to rush for 1,000 rushing yards in a single-season.

=== Regular season statistics ===
Legend
| **Bold** | Career high |

| Year | Team | Games | | Offense | | | | | |
| Year | Team | GP | GS | Snaps | Pct | Holding | False start | Decl/Pen | Acpt/Pen |
|---|---|---|---|---|---|---|---|---|---|
| 2020 | DAL | 16 | 14 | **970** | 85% | 1 | 2 | **3** | 4 |
| 2021 | DAL | 16 | 13 | 912 | 79% | **2** | 3 | 0 | **8** |
| 2022 | DAL | 13 | 13 | 818 | 94% | 1 | **5** | 0 | 6 |
| 2023 | DAL | 17 | 17 | 1177 | 99% | 2 | 4 | 1 | 5 |
| 2024 | DAL | 17 | 17 | 1171 | **100%** | 1 | 6 | 0 | 7 |
| 2025 | DAL | 8 | 8 | 545 | 99% | 2 | 0 | 0 | 2 |
| Career | | 87 | 82 | 5,593 | - | 9 | 20 | 4 | 33 |
