= Quinton Bohanna =

American football player (born 1999)

Profile
- Position: Defensive tackle

Personal information
- Born: March 16, 1999 (age 27); Memphis, Tennessee, U.S.
- Listed height: 6 ft 4 in (1.93 m)
- Listed weight: 355 lb (161 kg)

Career information
- High school: Cordova (Cordova, Tennessee)
- College: Kentucky (2017–2020)
- NFL draft: 2021: 6th round, 192nd overall pick

Career history
- Dallas Cowboys (2021–2022); Detroit Lions (2023); Tennessee Titans (2023); Seattle Seahawks (2024–2025); Green Bay Packers (2025); Jacksonville Jaguars (2026)*
- * Offseason or practice squad member only

Career NFL statistics as of 2025
- Total tackles: 44
- Stats at Pro Football Reference

Quinton Bohanna (born March 16, 1999) is an American professional football defensive tackle. He played college football for the Kentucky Wildcats and was selected by the Dallas Cowboys with the 192nd pick of the 2021 NFL draft.

== Early life ==
Bohanna attended Cordova High School. As a junior, he tallied 79 tackles and 12 sacks.

As a senior, he posted 91 tackles (24 tackles for loss) and 19 sacks, while contributing to the team having a 12–2 record and reaching the Tennessee Secondary School Athletic Association 6A semifinals.

Bohanna was a three-time All-state selection and ranked as a three–star recruit by 247Sports.com coming out of high school. He committed to Kentucky on February 24, 2016.

== College career ==
As a true freshman, he played in 12 out of 13 games, starting the last 5 contests at nose guard. He totaled 14 tackles and one pass breakup.

As a sophomore, he started in 7 out of 12 games. He collected 17 tackles (4 tackles for loss), one sack, one forced fumble and one fumble recovery. He missed the third game against Murray State University game with an injury.

As a junior, he started in all 13 games at nose guard. He registered 18 tackles (3 for loss), one sack and one pass breakup. He had 4 tackles against Mississippi State University.

As a senior, he appeared in 8 games and was a part of a defense that had 5 players selected in the 2021 NFL draft. He missed 3 contests with a knee injury. He posted 10 tackles (2 for loss), 3 quarterback hits and 2 pass breakups. He had 2 quarterback hits against Mississippi State University.

== Professional career ==
Pre-draft measurables
Height	Weight	Arm length	Hand span	Wingspan	40-yard dash	10-yard split	20-yard split	20-yard shuttle	Three-cone drill	Vertical jump	Broad jump
6 ft 4 in (1.93 m)	327 lb (148 kg)	34 in (0.86 m)	10 7/8 in (0.28 m)	6 ft 8 7/8 in (2.05 m)	5.47 s	1.81 s	3.07 s	5.15 s	8.21 s	29.0 in (0.74 m)	8 ft 3 in (2.51 m)
All values from Pro Day

=== Dallas Cowboys ===
Bohanna was selected by the Dallas Cowboys in the sixth round (192nd overall) of the 2021 NFL Draft. He signed his four-year rookie contract on May 13, 2021. As a rookie, he appeared in 14 games, with one start, posting 12 tackles and one quarterback hurry. He missed the sixteenth game against the Arizona Cardinals while on the Reserve/COVID-19 list. He was declared inactive for the season finale and the Wild Card Playoff contest.

In 2022, he appeared in 13 games with 9 starts at the one-technique defensive tackle position, registering 20 tackles, (3 for loss) and 2 quarterback pressures. He had 4 tackles against the Green Bay Packers. He missed 2 games with a shoulder injury. He was declared inactive in both playoff contests.

In the 2023 preseason, he fell on the depth chart behind Johnathan Hankins and first-round draft choice Mazi Smith. He was waived on August 29, 2023.

=== Detroit Lions ===
On August 31, 2023, Bohanna was signed to the Detroit Lions' practice squad. He made his season debut on November 11 in a win against the Chicago Bears.

=== Tennessee Titans ===
On December 13, 2023, the Tennessee Titans signed Bohanna off the Lions practice squad. He was waived on August 27.

=== Seattle Seahawks ===
On September 4, 2024, Bohanna was signed to the Seattle Seahawks' practice squad. He signed a reserve/future contract with Seattle on January 6, 2025.

On August 26, 2025, Bohanna was released by the Seahawks as part of final roster cuts and re-signed to the practice squad the next day. On November 8, he was signed to the active roster. On December 4, Bohanna was waived by the Seahawks.

=== Green Bay Packers ===
On December 5, 2025, Bohanna was claimed off waivers by the Green Bay Packers. He was waived by Green Bay on December 30.

=== Jacksonville Jaguars ===
On June 1, 2026, Bohanna signed with the Jacksonville Jaguars. He was released by Jacksonville on August 20.

== Career statistics ==
=== Regular season ===
Year	Team	Games		Tackles					Fumbles		
Year	Team	GP	GS	Total	Solo	Ast	Sck	TFL	FF	FR	PD
2021	DAL	14	1	10	3	7	0.0	0	0	0	0
2021	DAL	13	9	19	7	12	0.0	1	0	0	0
2023	DET	3	2	6	3	3	0.0	2	0	0	0
2023	TEN	3	1	4	2	2	0.0	0	0	0	0
2024	SEA	1	0	0	0	0	0.0	0	0	0	0
2025	SEA	5	0	3	0	3	0.0	0	0	0	0
2025	GB	1	2	1	1	0	0.0	0	0	0	0
Career		40	13	44	16	28	0.0	3	0	0	0
Source: pro-football-reference.com

== Personal life ==
His uncle Brian Ingram, played as a linebacker in the NFL. His father is the Memphis, Tennessee rapper Gangsta Blac.
