= Tyler Coyle =

American football player (born 1998)

Profile
- Position: Defensive back/Safety

Personal information
- Born: November 15, 1998 (age 27); Windsor, Connecticut, U.S.
- Listed height: 6 ft 1 in (1.85 m)
- Listed weight: 209 lb (95 kg)

Career information
- High school: Windsor (CT)
- College: UConn (2016–2019); Purdue (2020)
- NFL draft: 2021: undrafted

Career history
- Dallas Cowboys (2021–2022); Houston Gamblers (2023); Green Bay Packers (2023–2024)*; Cleveland Browns (2024)*; BC Lions (2024–2026)
- * Offseason or practice squad member only

Career NFL statistics
- Total tackles: 8
- Stats at Pro Football Reference

Tyler Coyle (born November 15, 1998) is an American professional football defensive back/safety who is currently a free agent. He went undrafted in the 2021 NFL draft. He played college football at UConn and Purdue, and previously played for the Dallas Cowboys in the NFL.

== Early life ==
Coyle attended Windsor High School. As a junior, he had 28 receptions for 700 yards and 11 touchdowns, winning Class L-Small state championship. As a senior, he had 29 receptions for 741 yards and 12 touchdowns, advancing to Class L semifinals. He was named First-team New Haven Register All-Star, was named to the All-Hartford Courant team and the Walter Camp Football Foundation All-Connecticut.

He was also a track athlete, winning six high school championships. Coyle played basketball in high school as well.

== College career ==
As a redshirt freshman, he appeared in all 12 games, with 9 starts. He led UConn with two interceptions, was second with seven passes defended and five pass breakups, and was third with 67 tackles. He also scored his first collegiate touchdown against Temple on a 34-yard interception return.

As a sophomore, he played in all 12 games, making 10 starts. He led UConn and was fourth in the American Athletic Conference with 107 total tackles. He also returned 13 kickoffs at 22.1 yards per return.

As a junior, he played in 11 games, leading UConn with 86 total tackles. He also forced two fumbles, had 3.5 TFL, one interception (returned 52 yards for a touchdown), nine pass breakups, and 54 solo stops.

As a senior and graduate transfer at Purdue, he played in 3 games, with one pass defensed and 13 total tackles (10 solo).

== Professional career ==
Pre-draft measurables
Height	Weight	Arm length	Hand span	40-yard dash	10-yard split	20-yard split	20-yard shuttle	Three-cone drill	Vertical jump	Broad jump	Bench press
6 ft 0 1/2 in (1.84 m)	209 lb (95 kg)	33 in (0.84 m)	9 in (0.23 m)	4.41 s	1.57 s	2.48 s	4.02 s	7.14 s	39.0 in (0.99 m)	11 ft 1 in (3.38 m)	24 reps
All values from Pro Day

=== Dallas Cowboys ===
At Purdue's pro day, he ran a 4.41 40-yard dash. (Note: Other sources have his 40-yard time as 4.36.) Nevertheless, Coyle went undrafted in the 2021 NFL draft. He signed with the Dallas Cowboys and was waived on August 31, 2021. He was re-signed to the practice squad the next day. He made his NFL debut on December 2, 2021, playing 17 special-teams snaps against the New Orleans Saints. He signed a reserve/future contract with the Cowboys on January 18, 2022.

On August 30, 2022, Coyle was waived by the Cowboys and signed to the practice squad the next day. He signed a reserve/future contract on January 24, 2023. He was waived on August 29, 2023. Coyle finished his stint with the Cowboys appearing in 3 games and making 8 tackles (5 solo, 3 assists), playing 37 snaps on defense and 56 on special teams.

=== Houston Gamblers ===
On December 8, 2023, Coyle signed with the Houston Gamblers of the United States Football League (USFL). As a result of the USFL's merger with its competitor, the XFL, to create the UFL, Coyle once again became a free agent.

=== Green Bay Packers ===
On January 1, 2024, Coyle was signed to the Green Bay Packers' practice squad. He signed a reserve/future contract on January 22, 2024.

Coyle was released by the Packers on August 14, 2024.

=== Cleveland Browns ===
On August 16, 2024, Coyle signed with the Cleveland Browns. He was waived on August 26, 2024.

=== BC Lions ===
Coyle was signed as a defensive back to the practice roster of the BC Lions on October 8, 2024. He re-signed with the team on November 29, 2024. On June 6, 2025, Coyle was placed on the Lions' 1-game injured list to start the 2025 CFL season. He rejoined the active roster on June 19, 2025. On July 4, 2025, Coyle was placed on the Lions' 6-game injured list, where he spent the remainder of the 2025 CFL season. On May 31, 2026, Coyle was released by Lions, during their final cuts before the start of the 2026 CFL season.
