= Josh Ball =

American football player (born 1998)

Profile
- Position: Offensive tackle

Personal information
- Born: May 15, 1998 (age 28); Fredericksburg, Virginia, U.S.
- Listed height: 6 ft 8 in (2.03 m)
- Listed weight: 325 lb (147 kg)

Career information
- High school: Stafford (Stafford, Virginia)
- College: Florida State (2017); Butler CC (2018); Marshall (2019–2020)
- NFL draft: 2021: 4th round, 138th overall pick

Career history
- Dallas Cowboys (2021–2024); New Orleans Saints (2024)

Awards and highlights
- First-team All-C-USA (2020)

Career NFL statistics as of 2024
- Games played: 13
- Stats at Pro Football Reference

Josh Ball (born May 15, 1998) is an American professional football offensive tackle. He was selected by the Dallas Cowboys in the fourth round of the 2021 NFL draft. He played college football at Florida State, Butler Community College, and Marshall.

== Early life ==
Ball grew up in Fredericksburg, Virginia and played football at Stafford Senior High School. As a senior, he was a starter at left tackle, while receiving All-State and All-conference honors.

He was a four-star recruit coming out of high school and committed to Florida State University to play college football.

== College career ==
As a redshirt freshman in 2017, he was named the starter left tackle in the fifth game against Duke University. He would remain as the starter on the left side for the last 9 contests of the season. In 2018, he was expected to be the Seminole's starter at right tackle, however, on May 21, 2018, he was suspended by the school for one year, after being accused of dating violence against his former girlfriend. Although he was never charged, he opted to transfer to Butler Community College, where he was named the starter at left tackle.

In 2019, he chose to transfer to Marshall University, instead of returning to Florida State University. As a junior, he was a key reserve on the team's offensive line, while playing in 13 games with one start against Western Kentucky University.

As a senior in 2020, the football season was reduced to 10 games due to the COVID-19 pandemic. He started 8 games at left tackle. He was ejected from the Conference USA Championship Game against the University of Alabama at Birmingham for incurring two personal foul penalties. He did not play in the 2020 Camellia Bowl, opting instead to start preparing for the NFL draft. He was named first-team All-Conference USA after the season. He was forced to miss the 2021 Hula Bowl, after testing positive for SARS-CoV-2, the virus responsible for the COVID-19 pandemic.

== Professional career ==
Pre-draft measurables
Height	Weight	Arm length	Hand span	40-yard dash	10-yard split	20-yard split	20-yard shuttle	Three-cone drill	Vertical jump	Broad jump	Bench press
6 ft 7 3/8 in (2.02 m)	308 lb (140 kg)	35 in (0.89 m)	10 in (0.25 m)	5.19 s	1.90 s	2.97 s	4.70 s	7.77 s	27.5 in (0.70 m)	8 ft 10 in (2.69 m)	28 reps
All values from Pro Day

=== Dallas Cowboys ===
Ball was selected by the Dallas Cowboys in the fourth round (138th overall) of the 2021 NFL draft. If it wasn’t for his problems off the field, he was projected to be a top-70 pick by some experts. He signed his rookie contract on May 20, 2021. Ball was placed on injured reserve with a high ankle sprain injury on September 2.

In 2022, Ball was given a chance to compete with rookie Matt Waletzko for the reserve swing tackle position. He didn't look comfortable in pass protection at tackle, forcing the Cowboys to sign the 40-year-old Jason Peters, after Tyron Smith suffered a torn hamstring in the preseason. In Week 14 against the Houston Texans, Ball replaced an injured Terence Steele (who tore both the ACL and MCL in his left knee). Late in the fourth quarter, Ball gave up a strip sack on quarterback Dak Prescott, which the Cowboys recovered to back them up at their three-yard line. On the next play, he got beat again and the defender hit Prescott's right arm as he was throwing, which led to a second interception, forcing Peters to play at right tackle for the first time since 2006, on the eventual 98-yard game-winning drive. Ball only played 41 snaps in 13 games as a backup during the season.

On August 29, 2023, Ball was placed on injured reserve after suffering a hip injury in the final preseason game.

Ball was released during roster cuts on August 27, 2024, and re-signed with the team's practice squad the next day.

=== New Orleans Saints ===
On December 31, 2024, the New Orleans Saints signed Ball to their active roster. He was declared inactive for the season finale against the Tampa Bay Buccaneers.

In 2025, he competed for the backup right tackle position behind Taliese Fuaga during the preseason. On July 28, 2025, Ball was waived by the Saints.
