= Kyron Brown =

American football player (born 1996)

Profile
- Position: Cornerback

Personal information
- Born: May 26, 1996 (age 30); Boynton Beach, Florida, U.S.
- Listed height: 6 ft 1 in (1.85 m)
- Listed weight: 195 lb (88 kg)

Career information
- High school: Boynton Beach
- College: Akron
- NFL draft: 2019: undrafted

Career history
- New York Jets (2019–2020); Dallas Cowboys (2021); Tennessee Titans (2022)*; Buffalo Bills (2023–2024)*
- * Offseason or practice squad member only

Awards and highlights
- Second-team All-MAC (2018)

Career NFL statistics as of 2023
- Total tackles: 5
- Stats at Pro Football Reference

Kyron Brown (born May 26, 1996) is an American professional football cornerback. He played college football for the Akron Zips, and signed with the New York Jets as an undrafted free agent in 2019.

== College career ==
Brown was a member of the Akron Zips for five seasons, redshirting his true freshman season. He recorded 121 tackles, six interceptions, 1 forced fumble and 25 passes defensed in 51 games played (26 starts).

== Professional career ==
Pre-draft measurables
Height	Weight	Arm length	Hand span	40-yard dash	10-yard split	20-yard split	20-yard shuttle	Three-cone drill	Vertical jump	Broad jump	Bench press
6 ft 1 in (1.85 m)	196 lb (89 kg)	31 5/8 in (0.80 m)	9 3/4 in (0.25 m)	4.61 s	1.55 s	2.67 s	4.47 s	7.34 s	39.0 in (0.99 m)	10 ft 1 in (3.07 m)	14 reps
All values from Pro Day

=== New York Jets ===
Brown signed with the New York Jets as an undrafted free agent on May 10, 2019. He was cut at the end of training camp during final roster cuts, but was re-signed by the Jets to their practice squad on September 1, 2019. Brown was promoted to the Jets' active roster on November 13, 2019. Brown made his NFL debut on November 17, 2019 against the Washington Redskins, playing ten snaps on special teams in a 34-17 victory. Brown made his first career start on December 8 against the Miami Dolphins, making five tackles before leaving the game due to a quad injury. He was placed on injured reserve on December 9, 2019. Brown was waived with a failed physical designation on May 5, 2020. He reverted to the reserve/physically unable to perform list the next day after clearing waivers. He was waived after the season on May 7, 2021.

=== Dallas Cowboys ===
On July 26, 2021, Brown signed a two-year deal with the Dallas Cowboys. He was waived on August 17. He was re-signed to the practice squad on September 1. He signed a reserve/future contract with the Cowboys on January 18, 2022. He was waived/injured on August 15, 2022 and placed on injured reserve. He was released on August 23.

=== Tennessee Titans ===
On October 18, 2022, Brown was signed to the Tennessee Titans' practice squad. On January 10, 2023, Brown was released by the Titans.

=== Buffalo Bills ===
On July 28, 2023, Brown signed with the Buffalo Bills. He was waived on August 29, 2023, and re-signed to the practice squad. He signed a reserve/future contract on January 22, 2024. He was waived on August 25.
