= Brandon Smith (wide receiver) =

American football player (born 1998)

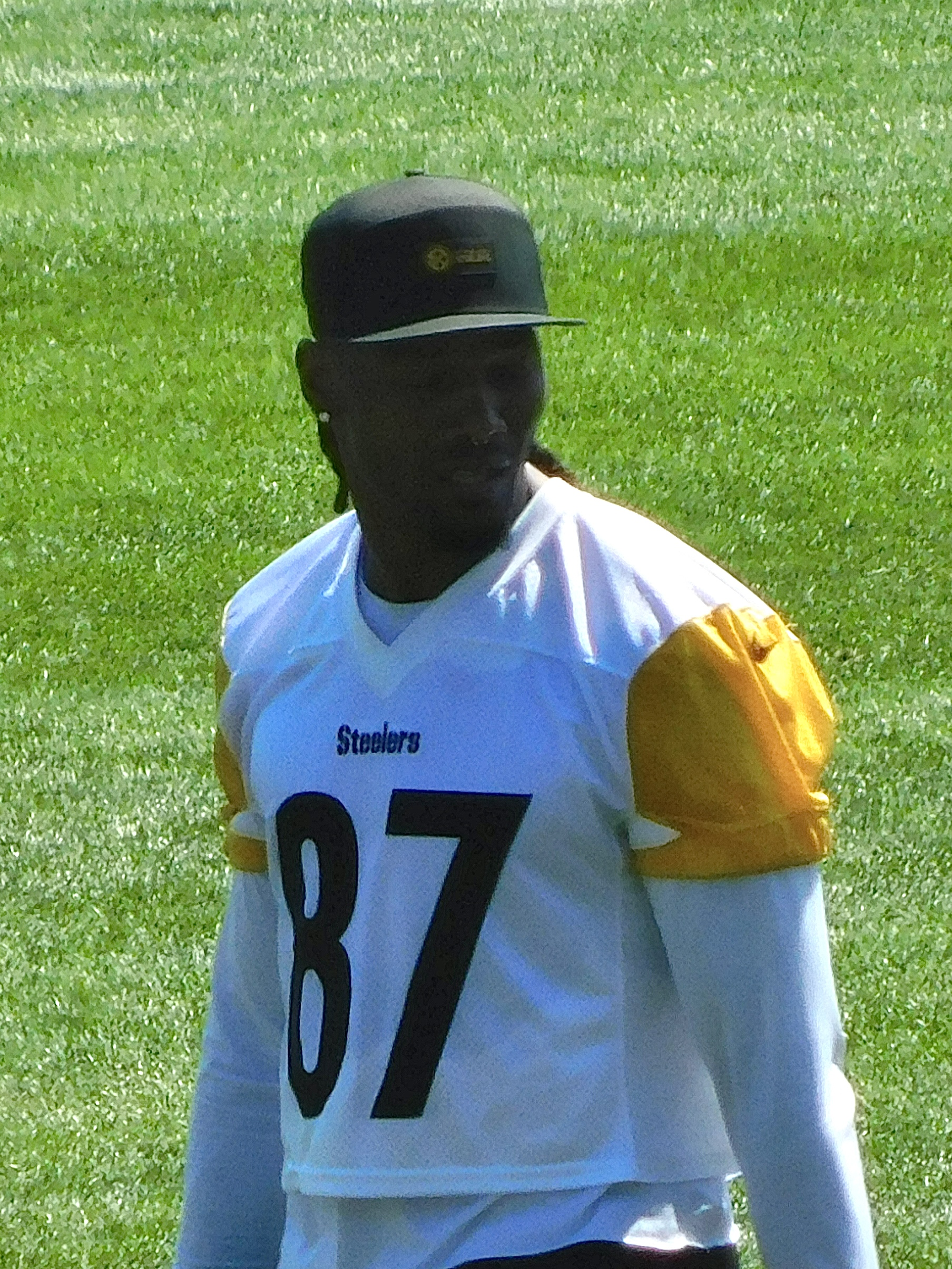
- Smith with the Pittsburgh Steelers in 2026

Profile
- Position: Wide receiver

Personal information
- Born: December 10, 1998 (age 27); Lake Cormorant, Mississippi, U.S.
- Listed height: 6 ft 1 in (1.85 m)
- Listed weight: 220 lb (100 kg)

Career information
- High school: Lake Cormorant
- College: Iowa (2017–2020)
- NFL draft: 2021: undrafted

Career history
- Dallas Cowboys (2021–2022)*; DC Defenders (2023); Arizona Cardinals (2023)*; DC Defenders (2024); New York Jets (2024–2025); New England Patriots (2025)*; Pittsburgh Steelers (2026)
- * Offseason or practice squad member only

Career NFL statistics as of 2026
- Receptions: 4
- Receiving yards: 39
- Stats at Pro Football Reference

Brandon Smith (born December 10, 1998) is an American professional football wide receiver. He played college football for the Iowa Hawkeyes and has also been a member of the Dallas Cowboys, Arizona Cardinals, New York Jets, New England Patriots, and Pittsburgh Steelers in the NFL and the DC Defenders of the XFL and later the United Football League (UFL).

== Early life ==
Smith was born on December 10, 1998, in Lake Cormorant, Mississippi. He attended Lake Cormorant High School where he was a three-year letterman in football and won four letters in track and field. A wide receiver in football, he totaled 78 receptions for 1,382 yards and 15 touchdowns as a junior. Then, as a senior, he caught 80 passes for 1,509 yards and 19 touchdowns, finishing his stint with the team having made 206 receptions for 3,672 yards and 41 touchdowns.

Smith was first-team all-conference as a sophomore, first-team all-state as a junior and senior, and was the 5A Region I Most Valuable Offensive Player of the Year in both his junior and senior years. Additionally, in track and field, he was runner-up at the state championships in the high jump as a junior and then won the title as a senior. He was a three-star recruit and committed to play college football for the Iowa Hawkeyes.

== College career ==
As a freshman at Iowa in 2017, Smith appeared in 10 games, catching three passes for 15 yards, although he had a costly fumble in their game against Michigan State which led to a 17–10 defeat. He saw more playing time as a sophomore in 2018, starting 12 games and recording 28 receptions for 361 yards and two touchdowns. He had his best year as a junior in 2019, totaling 37 catches for 439 yards and five touchdowns while appearing in nine games. As a senior in 2020, he made 23 catches for 231 yards and two touchdowns. Although he had a remaining year of eligibility, Smith opted to declare for the NFL draft following the 2020 season and concluded his collegiate career having made 88 receptions for 1,031 yards and nine touchdowns.

=== College ===
Year	Team	GP	Receiving			
Year	Team	GP	Rec	Yds	Avg	TD
2017	Iowa	10	3	15	5.0	0
2018	Iowa	12	28	361	12.9	2
2019	Iowa	9	37	439	11.9	5
2020	Iowa	8	23	231	10.0	2
Career		39	91	1,046	11.5	9

== Professional career ==
Pre-draft measurables
Height	Weight	Arm length	Hand span	Wingspan	40-yard dash	10-yard split	20-yard split	Vertical jump	Broad jump	Bench press
6 ft 1 3/8 in (1.86 m)	218 lb (99 kg)	34 1/4 in (0.87 m)	9 3/8 in (0.24 m)	6 ft 9 1/2 in (2.07 m)	4.64 s	1.56 s	2.69 s	39.0 in (0.99 m)	10 ft 10 in (3.30 m)	21 reps
All values from Pro Day

=== Dallas Cowboys ===
After going unselected in the 2021 NFL draft, Smith signed with the Dallas Cowboys as an undrafted free agent. He played in all four of the team's preseason games and caught seven passes for 67 yards and a touchdown. He was waived by the Cowboys on August 31, 2021, then re-signed to the practice squad the following day. He was added to the practice squad COVID-19 reserve/injured list on December 27, then activated on December 29. Smith was signed to a reserve/future contract with the Cowboys after the season, on January 17, 2022. In the preseason, he made six receptions for 118 yards and scored one touchdown. He was waived again on August 30, then re-signed to the practice squad the next day. Smith was released from the practice squad on January 30, 2023.

=== DC Defenders (first stint) ===
Smith signed with the DC Defenders of the XFL on February 23, 2023, following the first game of the 2023 XFL season. He appeared in eight games, none as a starter, for the Defenders, catching eight passes for 118 yards and a touchdown while also returning 10 kickoffs for 218 yards with a long return of 37. He also scored one two-point conversion attempt.

=== Arizona Cardinals ===
Following the XFL season, Smith signed with the Arizona Cardinals of the NFL on June 12, 2023. He appeared in two preseason games for the Cardinals, catching one pass for six yards. Smith was waived by the Cardinals on August 29.

=== DC Defenders (second stint) ===
Smith returned to the DC Defenders for the 2024 season, which they played in the newly-formed United Football League (UFL). He played in eight games for the Defenders, five as a starter, and caught 18 passes for 209 yards and two touchdowns with a long of 40, also making three tackles.

=== New York Jets ===
Smith returned to the NFL by signing with the New York Jets on August 2, 2024. In the preseason, he played in three games and caught five passes for 120 yards. Smith was waived by the Jets on August 27, then re-signed to the practice squad the next day. He was placed on the practice squad injured list on September 27, then later activated from the list. Smith was elevated from the practice squad to the active roster for the team's Week 15 game against the Jacksonville Jaguars and made his NFL debut in the game, appearing on one offensive snap. He signed a reserve/future contract with the Jets on January 6, 2025.

On August 26, 2025, Smith was waived by the Jets as part of final roster cuts and re-signed to the practice squad the next day. He was promoted to the active roster on October 25, but released three days later and re-signed to the practice squad. He was released on December 2.

=== New England Patriots ===
On December 23, 2025, Smith was signed to the New England Patriots' practice squad. He was released by New England on January 13, 2026.

=== Pittsburgh Steelers ===
On January 15, 2026, Smith signed a reserve/futures contract with the Pittsburgh Steelers. Smith was waived by Pittsburgh as a part of final roster cuts on August 30; he was re-signed to the team's practice squad the following day. He was signed to the active roster on October 31. On November 19, Smith was waived.
