= Nick Ralston =

American football player (born 1996)

Profile
- Position: Fullback

Personal information
- Born: November 10, 1996 (age 30); Dallas, Texas
- Listed height: 6 ft 0 in (1.83 m)
- Listed weight: 237 lb (108 kg)

Career information
- High school: Argyle (Argyle, TX)
- College: Louisiana-Lafayette
- NFL draft: 2021: undrafted

Career history
- Dallas Cowboys (2021)
- Stats at Pro Football Reference

Nick Ralston (born November 10, 1996) is an American football fullback who is a free agent. He played college football at Louisiana and Arizona State. He signed with the Cowboys after going undrafted in the 2021 NFL draft.

== Early life ==
Ralston attended Argyle High School. As a junior, he tallied 1,800 rushing yards and 31 touchdowns, guiding the team to a 16-0 record and the 2013 Class 3A Division II championship. He also played a hybrid defensive end/linebacker position on defense.

As a senior, he had 337 carries for 2,474 yards and 41 touchdowns, to help his team finish with an undefeated record and lead all Dallas-Fort Worth area rushers (regardless of school classification).

He finished high school career after rushing for nearly 6,000 yards, scoring 94 rushing touchdowns and playing in three state championship games.

== College career ==
Ralston accepted a football scholarship from Arizona State University. As a redshirt freshman, he was the third-string running back, collecting 32 carries for 139 yards (4.3-yard avg.) and 2 touchdowns. He had 10 carries for 54 yards against the University of Oregon.

As a sophomore, he appeared in all 12 games, providing depth in the backfield after being passed on the depth chart. He had 4 carries for 22 yards (5.5-yard avg.) and 6 receptions for 32 yards.

As a junior, he was converted into a linebacker. He was a backup player, making 3 tackles and one fumble recovery. He also played as a tight end, making 4 receptions for 18 yards and one touchdown.

As a senior, he transferred to the University of Louisiana at Lafayette. He played primarily at tight end and started all 14 games. He registered 15 receptions for 100 yards and 4 touchdowns.

== Professional career ==
Pre-draft measurables
Height	Weight
5 ft 11 3/4 in (1.82 m)	240 lb (109 kg)
All values from Pro Day

After the vast majority of College Pro Days were canceled in 2020 due to the COVID-19 pandemic, Ralston did not sign with an NFL team. Afterwards, he continued to train for the next year in preparation for 2021 College Pro Days. In March 2021, Ralston had his Pro Day opportunity at the University of Louisiana at Lafayette. His results were among the best in the nation for fullback prospects.

=== Dallas Cowboys ===
Ralston was signed as an undrafted free agent by the Dallas Cowboys after the 2020 NFL draft on May 1. He was waived on August 31, 2021 and re-signed to the practice squad the next day. He was promoted to the active roster on October 16, 2021. He was waived on October 19 and re-signed to the practice squad. He appeared in 4 games and had one special teams tackle.

He signed a reserve/future contract with the Cowboys on January 18, 2022. He was waived on July 28, 2022.
