= JaQuan Hardy =

American football player (born 1997)

No. 37
- Position: Running back

Personal information
- Born: December 31, 1997 (age 28); East Cleveland, Ohio, U.S.
- Listed height: 5 ft 10 in (1.78 m)
- Listed weight: 225 lb (102 kg)

Career information
- High school: Westlake (Westlake, Ohio)
- College: Tiffin (2016–2020)
- NFL draft: 2021: undrafted

Career history
- Dallas Cowboys (2021); Denver Broncos (2022)*; BC Lions (2023)
- * Offseason or practice squad member only

Awards and highlights
- 2019 G-MAC Athlete of the Year; 2019 G-MAC First-team All-Conference; G-MAC rushing record (tied)

Career NFL statistics
- Rushing yards: 29
- Rushing average: 7.3
- Rushing touchdowns: 1
- Stats at Pro Football Reference
- Stats at CFL.ca

JaQuan Hardy (born December 31, 1997) is an American former professional football player who was a running back in the National Football League (NFL) and Canadian Football League (CFL). He played college football for the Tiffin Dragons.

== Early life ==
Hardy was born in East Cleveland, Ohio, on December 31, 1997, and attended Westlake High School, where he rushed for 1,800 yards, 23 touchdowns, and over 2,500 yards of total offense and received Second-team All-Ohio performer honors.

== College career ==
Hardy accepted a football scholarship from Division II Tiffin University. As a true freshman, the former All-Ohio selection from Westlake High School contributed in 11 games as a reserve, rushing for 576 yards and 5 touchdowns. In 2017, he led the Dragons in rushing as an 11-game starter: 1,077 yards and 8 touchdowns.

In 2018, he suffered a career-threatening knee injury, redshirting the 2018 season. In 2019, he started all 11 games, rushing for 1,554 yards and 15 touchdowns which ranked third in Division II. He was named the 2019-20 Great Midwest Athletic Conference's Male Athlete of the Year, as well as first-team all-conference. His 1,554 rushing yards during his Junior season tied the Great Midwest Athletic Conference rushing record, establishing himself as one of the best players in Tiffin program history.

Due to the COVID-19 pandemic, Tiffin did not play any football games in 2020. He declared for the NFL Draft in 2021, instead of returning for a fifth year. He finished third in school history in rushing yards, third in touchdowns, fifth in rushing attempts, tied for eighth in points, and eighth in all-purpose yards.

=== College statistics ===
| Year | Team | GP | Rushing | | | | Receiving | | | | Scrimmage | | | |
| Year | Team | GP | Att | Yds | Avg | TD | Rec | Yds | Avg | TD | Touch | Yds | Avg | TD |
|---|---|---|---|---|---|---|---|---|---|---|---|---|---|---|
| 2016 | Tiffin | 11 | 90 | 576 | 6.4 | 5 | 10 | 41 | 4.1 | 2 | 100 | 617 | 6.2 | 7 |
| 2017 | Tiffin | 11 | 207 | 1,077 | 5.2 | 8 | 13 | 136 | 10.5 | 0 | 220 | 1,213 | 5.5 | 8 |
| 2019 | Tiffin | 11 | 204 | 1,554 | 7.6 | 15 | 15 | 107 | 7.1 | 1 | 219 | 1,661 | 7.6 | 16 |
| Career | | 33 | 501 | 3,207 | 6.4 | 28 | 38 | 284 | 8.6 | 3 | 539 | 3,491 | 6.5 | 31 |

== Professional career ==
Pre-draft measurables
| Height | Weight | Arm length | Hand span | 40-yard dash | 10-yard split | 20-yard split | 20-yard shuttle | Three-cone drill | Vertical jump | Broad jump | Bench press |
|---|---|---|---|---|---|---|---|---|---|---|---|
| 5 ft 8 1/4 in (1.73 m) | 211 lb (96 kg) | 29 7/8 in (0.76 m) | 8 3/4 in (0.22 m) | 4.56 s | 1.58 s | 2.64 s | 4.14 s | 6.98 s | 33.0 in (0.84 m) | 9 ft 11 in (3.02 m) | 21 reps |
All values from Pro Day

=== Dallas Cowboys ===
Hardy was signed as an undrafted free agent by the Dallas Cowboys after the 2021 NFL draft. In the 2021 preseason, Hardy was featured as a part of the Hard Knocks television series on HBO. He was waived on August 31, 2021 and re-signed to the practice squad. Hardy was elevated in Week 14 and Week 15, to replace an injured Tony Pollard. He registered 3 rushing yards and a kick return for 15 yards against the Washington Football Team. He was demoted to the practice squad on December 29.

In Week 18 with the starters resting for the playoffs, Dallas would elevate Hardy for the season finale against the Philadelphia Eagles, where had 3 carries for 26 yards and a touchdown, helping the franchise set the NFL record with 22 different players scoring a touchdown in one regular season. He signed a reserve/future contract on January 18, 2022. He was waived on July 14, 2022.

=== Denver Broncos ===
On August 10, 2022, Hardy signed with the Denver Broncos. He was waived on August 29.

=== BC Lions ===
On August 8, 2023, Hardy signed with the BC Lions practice roster. He was released by the Lions on November 13, 2023, after playing two games on the active roster.
