= 2018 Dallas Cowboys season =

59th season in franchise history

- Owner: Jerry Jones
- General manager: Jerry Jones
- Head coach: Jason Garrett
- Offensive coordinator: Scott Linehan
- Defensive coordinator: Rod Marinelli
- Home stadium: AT&T Stadium

Results
- Record: 10–6
- Division place: 1st NFC East
- Playoffs: Won Wild Card Playoffs (vs. Seahawks) 24–22; Lost Divisional Playoffs (at Rams) 22–30
- All-Pros: 4: RG Zack Martin (1st team); RB Ezekiel Elliott (2nd team); LB Leighton Vander Esch (2nd team); CB Byron Jones (2nd team)
- Pro Bowlers: 8: QB Dak Prescott; RB Ezekiel Elliott; WR Amari Cooper (Note: Cooper played 6 games with the Raiders before being traded to the Cowboys on October 2018); T Tyron Smith; G Zack Martin; DE DeMarcus Lawrence; ILB Leighton Vander Esch; CB Byron Jones

Uniform
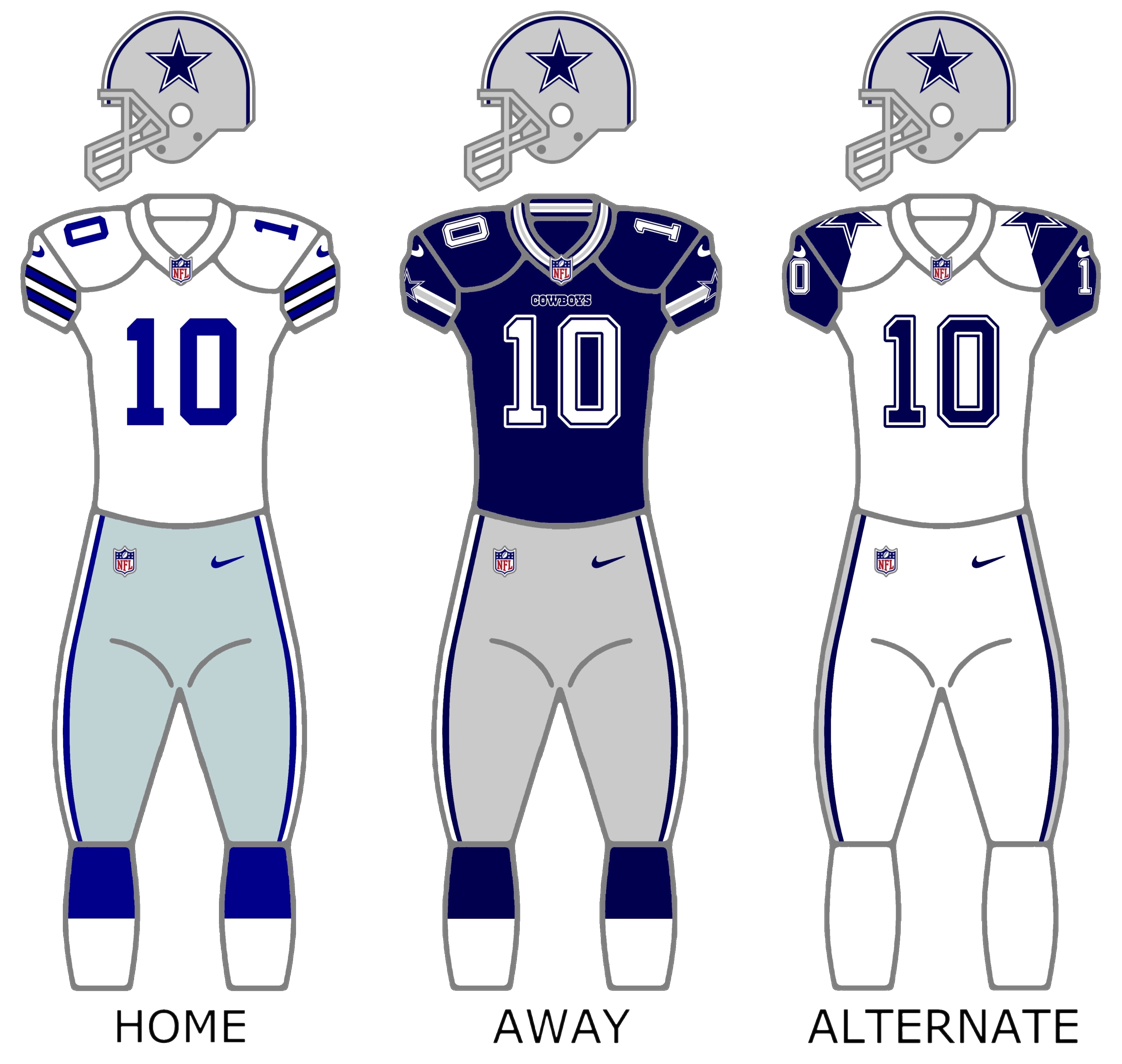

The 2018 season was the Dallas Cowboys' 59th in the National Football League (NFL), their 30th under the ownership of Jerry Jones, their 10th playing their home games at AT&T Stadium, and their eighth full season under head coach Jason Garrett. AT&T Stadium also became the first stadium venue to host the annual draft. For the first time since 2009, wide receiver Dez Bryant was not on the opening day roster, as he was released on April 13, 2018 and later signed with the New Orleans Saints on November 7, 2018. For the first time since 2002, tight end Jason Witten was not on the opening day roster, having announced his retirement on May 3, 2018. For the first time since 2010, kicker Dan Bailey was not on the opening day roster, as he was released on September 1, 2018.

The Cowboys clinched the NFC East division following a Week 16 win over the Tampa Bay Buccaneers and a week later, improved their 9–7 record from the previous season with a win over the New York Giants.

In the playoffs, the Cowboys defeated the Seattle Seahawks 24–22 in the wild-card round and advanced to the Divisional round, where they lost to the eventual NFC champion Los Angeles Rams 30–22, suffering both their sixth straight Divisional playoff defeat and eighth straight road playoff loss. The Cowboys would not return to the playoffs until 2021.

== Offseason ==
=== Signings ===
Position	Player	Age	2017 Team	Contract
WR	Allen Hurns	26	Jacksonville Jaguars	2 years, $12 Million
WR	Deonte Thompson (†)	29	Buffalo Bills	1 year, $1.8 Million
OT	Cameron Fleming	25	New England Patriots	1 year, $2.5 Million
OG	Marcus Martin	24	Cleveland Browns	1 year, $880,000
ILB	Joe Thomas	27	Green Bay Packers	2 years, $3.6 Million

(†) - Later released

=== Re-signings ===
Position	Player	Age	Contract
C	Joe Looney	27	2 years, $2.1 Million
LS	L. P. Ladouceur	37	1 year, $1.105 Million

=== Acquisitions ===
Position	Player	Age	2017 Team	Contract	Traded away
FB	Jamize Olawale	29	Oakland Raiders	1 year, $1.54 Million	2018 5th round pick (Johnny Townsend)
WR	Tavon Austin	28	Los Angeles Rams	1 year, $7 Million	2018 6th round pick (Jamil Demby)
WR	Amari Cooper	24	Oakland Raiders	2 years, $11 Million	2019 1st round pick (Johnathan Abram)

=== Departures ===
Position	Player	Age	2018 Team
QB	Zac Dysert	28	Unsigned
QB	Kellen Moore	30	Retired
RB	Alfred Morris	29	San Francisco 49ers
FB	Keith Smith	26	Oakland Raiders
WR	Dez Bryant	29	New Orleans Saints
WR	Brice Butler	28	Miami Dolphins
WR	Ryan Switzer	24	Pittsburgh Steelers (via Oakland Raiders)
TE	James Hanna	29	Retired
TE	Jason Witten	36	Retired
OT	Byron Bell	29	Green Bay Packers
OT	Chaz Green	26	Oakland Raiders
OG	Jonathan Cooper	28	Washington Redskins
DE	Benson Mayowa	27	Arizona Cardinals
MLB	Anthony Hitchens	26	Kansas City Chiefs
OLB	Kyle Wilber	29	Oakland Raiders
CB	Bene Benwikere	26	Oakland Raiders
CB	Orlando Scandrick	31	Kansas City Chiefs
K	Dan Bailey	30	Minnesota Vikings

== Draft ==
2018 Dallas Cowboys draft
Round	Pick	Player	Position	College	Notes
1	19	Leighton Vander Esch *	Linebacker	Boise State	
2	50	Connor Williams	Guard	Texas	
3	81	Michael Gallup	Wide receiver	Colorado State	
4	116	Dorance Armstrong Jr.	Defensive end	Kansas	
4	137	Dalton Schultz	Tight end	Stanford	Compensatory selection
5	171	Mike White	Quarterback	Western Kentucky	Compensatory selection
6	193	Chris Covington	Linebacker	Indiana	
6	208	Cedrick Wilson Jr.	Wide receiver	Boise State	Compensatory selection
7	236	Bo Scarbrough	Running back	Alabama	
Made roster * Made at least one Pro Bowl during career

Notes

- The Cowboys were awarded one fourth-round, two fifth-round and one sixth-round compensatory picks (137th, 171st, 173rd and 208th overall).
- The Cowboys traded their fifth-round selection (157th overall) to the New York Jets in exchange for the Jets' sixth-round selection in 2017 (191st overall).
- The Cowboys traded their fifth-round selection (173rd overall) to Oakland in exchange for Oakland's sixth-round selection (192nd overall) and fullback Jamize Olawale.
- The Cowboys traded their sixth-round selection (192nd overall) to the Los Angeles Rams in exchange for wide receiver Tavon Austin.

=== Undrafted free agents ===
Name	Position	College
Jordan Chunn	Running back	Troy
Jake Campos	Tackle	Iowa State
Malik Earl	Wide receiver	Missouri State
James Hearns	Defensive end	Louisville
Kam Kelly	Cornerback	San Diego State
Bryce Johnson	Offensive linemen	St. Cloud State
Joel Lanning	Linebacker	Iowa State
Austin Larkin	Defensive end	Purdue
Marchie Murdock	Wide receiver	Iowa State
Donovan Olumba	Cornerback	Portland State
Dequinton Osbourne	Defensive tackle	Oklahoma State
Kyle Queiro	Linebacker	Northwestern
Jay Robertson	Offensive linemen	Tennessee
Tyree Robinson	Safety	Oregon
Ed Shockely	Linebacker	Villanova
Dalton Sturm	Quarterback	UTSA
David Wells	Tight End	San Diego State
Charvarius Ward	Cornerback	Middle Tennessee

== Staff ==
2018 Dallas Cowboys staff
Front office: Owner/president/general manager – Jerry Jones; COO/executive vice president/director of player personnel – Stephen Jones; Senior director of football operations/football administration – Todd Williams; Director of salary cap & player contracts – Adam Prasifka; Vice president player personnel – Will McClay; Senior executive, college scouting – Tom Ciskowski; Director of college scouting – Lionel Vital; Director of pro scouting – Alex Loomis; Assistant director of college scouting – Chris Hall; Director of football research – Tom Robinson; Head coaches: Head coach – Jason Garrett; Offensive coaches: Offensive coordinator – Scott Linehan; Quarterbacks – Kellen Moore; Running backs – Gary Brown; Wide receivers – Sanjay Lal; Assistant wide receivers – Kyle Valero; Tight ends – Doug Nussmeier; Offensive line – Marc Colombo; Offensive assistant – Stephen Brown	Defensive coaches: Defensive coordinator/defensive line – Rod Marinelli; Defensive tackles – Leon Lett; Linebackers – Ben Bloom; Defensive backs/passing game coordinator – Kris Richard; Safeties – Greg Jackson; Defensive assistant – Ken Amato; Special teams coaches: Special teams coordinator – Keith O'Quinn; Assistant special teams – Doug Colman; Strength and conditioning: Director of strength and conditioning – Mike Woicik; Strength and conditioning – Brett Bech; Strength and conditioning – Markus Paul; Assistant strength and conditioning – Kendall Smith

== Rosters ==
=== Opening preseason roster ===
Dallas Cowboys 2018 opening preseason roster
Quarterbacks: 4 Dak Prescott; 7 Cooper Rush; 1 Dalton Sturm; 3 Mike White; Running backs: 46 Jordan Chunn; 21 Ezekiel Elliott; 44 Darius Jackson; 49 Jamize Olawale FB; 36 Bo Scarbrough; 45 Rod Smith; 34 Trey Williams; Wide receivers: 10 Tavon Austin; 11 Cole Beasley; 85 Noah Brown; 81 K. D. Cannon; 13 Michael Gallup; 17 Allen Hurns; 2 Ricky Jeune; 14 Lance Lenoir; 19 Mekale McKay; 18 Marchie Murdock; 15 Deonte Thompson; 83 Terrance Williams; Tight ends: 80 Rico Gathers; 89 Blake Jarwin; 86 Dalton Schultz; 87 Geoff Swaim; 84 David Wells	Offensive linemen: 63 Jake Campos T; 71 La'el Collins T/G; 78 Kadeem Edwards T/G; 75 Cameron Fleming T; 72 Travis Frederick C; 79 Chaz Green G/T; 74 Korren Kirven T; 73 Joe Looney C/G; 69 Damien Mama G/C; 60 Marcus Martin G/C; 70 Zack Martin G; 77 Tyron Smith T; 67 Dustin Stanton G; 52 Connor Williams G/T; Defensive linemen: 74 Dorance Armstrong Jr. DE; 93 Richard Ash DT/DE; 97 Taco Charlton DE; 98 Tyrone Crawford DE/DT; 76 Kony Ealy DE; 94 Randy Gregory DE; 56 Datone Jones DT/DE; 65 Austin Larkin DE; 90 DeMarcus Lawrence DE; 92 Brian Price DT; 66 Lewis Neal DT/DE; 68 Daniel Ross DT; 67 Joby Saint Fleur DE; 99 Charles Tapper DE; 51 Jihad Ward DT; 64 Antwaun Woods DT	Linebackers: 59 Chris Covington OLB; 58 Tre'Von Johnson MLB; 43 Joel Lanning MLB; 50 Sean Lee OLB; 53 Justin March-Lillard OLB; 42 Eric Pinkins OLB/SS; 41 Kyle Queiro OLB/SS; 54 Jaylon Smith MLB; 48 Joe Thomas MLB/OLB; 55 Leighton Vander Esch OLB/MLB; 57 Damien Wilson OLB/MLB; Defensive backs: 24 Chidobe Awuzie CB; 30 Anthony Brown CB; 35 Kavon Frazier SS; 38 Jeff Heath SS/FS; 20 Marqueston Huff FS; 31 Byron Jones CB; 37 Kam Kelly CB/FS; 27 Jourdan Lewis CB; 32 Donovan Olumba CB; 23 Tyree Robinson FS/CB; 28 Jameill Showers SS/FS; 26 Duke Thomas CB; 40 Charvarius Ward CB; 39 Marquez White CB; 25 Xavier Woods FS/CB; Special teams: 5 Dan Bailey K; 47 Scott Daly LS; 6 Chris Jones P; 91 L. P. Ladouceur LS; 2 Brett Maher K	Reserve lists: 96 Maliek Collins DT (active/PUP); 95 David Irving DT/DE (did not report); 16 Cedrick Wilson Jr. WR (IR); 90 active, 2 inactive

=== Week one roster ===
Dallas Cowboys 2018 week one roster
Quarterbacks: 4 Dak Prescott; 7 Cooper Rush; 3 Mike White; Running backs: 21 Ezekiel Elliott; 49 Jamize Olawale FB; 45 Rod Smith; Wide receivers: 10 Tavon Austin; 11 Cole Beasley; 13 Michael Gallup; 17 Allen Hurns; 15 Deonte Thompson; 83 Terrance Williams; Tight ends: 80 Rico Gathers; 89 Blake Jarwin; 86 Dalton Schultz; 87 Geoff Swaim	Offensive linemen: 71 La'el Collins T; 78 Kadeem Edwards G/T; 75 Cameron Fleming T; 72 Travis Frederick C; 73 Joe Looney C/G; 70 Zack Martin G; 61 Adam Redmond C/G; 77 Tyron Smith T; 52 Connor Williams G; Defensive linemen: 92 Dorance Armstrong Jr. DE; 97 Taco Charlton DE; 96 Maliek Collins DT; 98 Tyrone Crawford DT/DE; 94 Randy Gregory DE; 56 Datone Jones DT/DE; 90 DeMarcus Lawrence DE; 93 Daniel Ross DT; 99 Antwaun Woods DT	Linebackers: 59 Chris Covington OLB; 50 Sean Lee OLB; 53 Justin March-Lillard OLB; 54 Jaylon Smith MLB; 48 Joe Thomas MLB/OLB; 55 Leighton Vander Esch OLB/MLB; 57 Damien Wilson OLB; Defensive backs: 24 Chidobe Awuzie CB; 30 Anthony Brown CB; 20 Ibraheim Campbell SS; 35 Kavon Frazier SS; 38 Jeff Heath SS/FS; 31 Byron Jones CB; 27 Jourdan Lewis CB; 23 Tyree Robinson FS/SS; 25 Xavier Woods FS/CB; Special teams: 6 Chris Jones P; 91 L. P. Ladouceur LS; 2 Brett Maher K	Reserve lists: 85 Noah Brown WR (IR); 79 Parker Ehinger G/T (IR); -- Marqueston Huff FS (IR); 95 David Irving DT/DE (did not report); 60 Marcus Martin G/C (IR); 28 Jameill Showers SS/FS (IR); 67 Dustin Stanton G (IR); 16 Cedrick Wilson Jr. WR (IR); Practice Squad: 18 Dres Anderson WR; 63 Jake Campos T; 46 Jordan Chunn RB; 34 Treston Decoud CB/FS; 14 Lance Lenoir WR; 32 Donovan Olumba CB; 41 Kyle Queiro OLB/SS; 36 Bo ScarbroughRB; 51 Aziz Shittu DT; 68 Cody Wichmann G; 53 Active, 8 Inactive, 10 Practice Squad

=== Final roster ===
2018 Dallas Cowboys roster
Quarterbacks (QB): 4 Dak Prescott; 7 Cooper Rush; 3 Mike White; Running backs (RB): 21 Ezekiel Elliott; 26 Darius Jackson; 49 Jamize Olawale FB; 45 Rod Smith; Wide receivers (WR): 10 Tavon Austin; 11 Cole Beasley; 85 Noah Brown; 19 Amari Cooper; 13 Michael Gallup; 17 Allen Hurns; Tight ends (TE): 80 Rico Gathers; 89 Blake Jarwin; 86 Dalton Schultz	Offensive linemen (OL): 71 La'el Collins T; 75 Cameron Fleming T; 73 Joe Looney C; 70 Zack Martin G; 61 Adam Redmond C/G; 77 Tyron Smith T; 76 Xavier Suʻa-Filo G; 52 Connor Williams G; Defensive linemen (DL): 92 Dorance Armstrong DE; 97 Taco Charlton DE; 96 Maliek Collins DT; 98 Tyrone Crawford DT/DE; 94 Randy Gregory DE; 95 David Irving DT/DE; 90 DeMarcus Lawrence DE; 51 Caraun Reid DT; 93 Daniel Ross DT; 99 Antwaun Woods DT	Linebackers (LB): 59 Chris Covington OLB; 50 Sean Lee OLB; 53 Justin March-Lillard OLB; 54 Jaylon Smith MLB; 48 Joe Thomas MLB; 55 Leighton Vander Esch OLB; 57 Damien Wilson OLB; Defensive backs (DB): 24 Chidobe Awuzie CB; 30 Anthony Brown CB; 35 Kavon Frazier FS; 29 C. J. Goodwin CB; 38 Jeff Heath SS; 31 Byron Jones CB; 27 Jourdan Lewis CB; 20 Darian Thompson SS; 25 Xavier Woods FS; Special teams (ST): 6 Chris Jones P; 91 L. P. Ladouceur LS; 2 Brett Maher K	Practice squad: 63 Jake Campos T; 46 Jordan Chunn RB; 18 Reggie Davis WR; 34 Treston Decoud CB; 14 Lance Lenoir WR; 32 Donovan Olumba CB; 67 Oni Omoile G; 41 Kyle Queiro OLB; 65 Aziz Shittu DT; 78 Cody Wichmann G; Reserve: 79 Parker Ehinger G/T (IR); 72 Travis Frederick C (NF-Ill.); 20 Marqueston Huff FS (IR); 56 Datone Jones DT/DE (IR); 60 Marcus Martin G/C (IR); 28 Jameill Showers S (IR); 67 Dustin Stanton G (IR); 87 Geoff Swaim TE (IR); 83 Terrance Williams WR (IR); 16 Cedrick Wilson Jr. WR (IR); Rookies in italics 53 active, 10 reserve, 10 practice squad

== Preseason ==
Week	Date	Opponent	Result	Record	Game site	NFL.com recap
1	August 9	at San Francisco 49ers	L 21–24	0–1	Levi's Stadium	Recap
2	August 18	Cincinnati Bengals	L 13–21	0–2	AT&T Stadium	Recap
3	August 26	Arizona Cardinals	L 3–27	0–3	AT&T Stadium	Recap
4	August 30	at Houston Texans	L 6–14	0–4	NRG Stadium	Recap

== Regular season ==
=== Schedule ===
The Cowboys' 2018 schedule was announced on April 19.

Week	Date	Opponent	Result	Record	Game site	NFL.com recap
1	September 9	at Carolina Panthers	**L** 8–16	0–1	Bank of America Stadium	Recap
2	September 16	**New York Giants**	**W** 20–13	1–1	AT&T Stadium	Recap
3	September 23	at Seattle Seahawks	**L** 13–24	1–2	CenturyLink Field	Recap
4	September 30	Detroit Lions	**W** 26–24	2–2	AT&T Stadium	Recap
5	October 7	at Houston Texans	**L** 16–19 (OT)	2–3	NRG Stadium	Recap
6	October 14	Jacksonville Jaguars	**W** 40–7	3–3	AT&T Stadium	Recap
7	October 21	at **Washington Redskins**	**L** 17–20	3–4	FedExField	Recap
8	Bye					
9	November 5	Tennessee Titans	**L** 14–28	3–5	AT&T Stadium	Recap
10	November 11	at **Philadelphia Eagles**	**W** 27–20	4–5	Lincoln Financial Field	Recap
11	November 18	at Atlanta Falcons	**W** 22–19	5–5	Mercedes-Benz Stadium	Recap
12	November 22	**Washington Redskins**	**W** 31–23	6–5	AT&T Stadium	Recap
13	November 29	New Orleans Saints	**W** 13–10	7–5	AT&T Stadium	Recap
14	December 9	**Philadelphia Eagles**	**W** 29–23 (OT)	8–5	AT&T Stadium	Recap
15	December 16	at Indianapolis Colts	**L** 0–23	8–6	Lucas Oil Stadium	Recap
16	December 23	Tampa Bay Buccaneers	**W** 27–20	9–6	AT&T Stadium	Recap
17	December 30	at **New York Giants**	**W** 36–35	10–6	MetLife Stadium	Recap

Note: Intra-division opponents are in bold text.

=== Game summaries ===
==== Week 1: at Carolina Panthers ====
Week One: Dallas Cowboys at Carolina Panthers – Game summary

Quarter	1	2	3	4	Total
Cowboys	0	0	0	8	**8**
**Panthers**	0	10	0	6	**16**

at Bank of America Stadium, Charlotte, North Carolina

- Date: September 9
- Game time: 4:25 p.m. EDT/3:25 p.m. CDT
- Game weather: 81 °F (27 °C), partly cloudy
- Game attendance: 74,532
- Referee: Walt Anderson
- TV announcers (Fox): Joe Buck, Troy Aikman, Erin Andrews, and Mike Pereira
- Recap, Gamebook

Game information

**First quarter**

- No scoring plays

**Second quarter**

- CAR – Cam Newton 4-yard run (Graham Gano kick), 8:54. Panthers 7–0. **Drive: 7 plays, 35 yards, 3:28.**
- CAR – Graham Gano 27-yard field goal, 0:07. Panthers 10–0. **Drive: 11 plays, 53 yards, 2:41.**

**Third quarter**

- No scoring plays

**Fourth quarter**

- CAR – Alexander Armah 1-yard run (kick failed), 14:16. Panthers 16–0. **Drive: 6 plays, 63 yards, 3:25.**
- DAL – Ezekiel Elliott 4-yard run (Dak Prescott run), 8:58. Panthers 16–8. **Drive: 10 plays, 75 yards, 5:21.**

**Top passers**

- DAL – Dak Prescott – 19/29, 170 yards
- CAR – Cam Newton – 17/26, 161 yards

**Top rushers**

- DAL – Ezekiel Elliott – 15 rushes, 69 yards, TD
- CAR – Cam Newton – 13 rushes, 58 yards, TD

**Top receivers**

- DAL – Cole Beasley – 7 receptions, 73 yards
- CAR – Christian McCaffrey – 6 receptions, 45 yards

Despite a strong showing from the defense, the Cowboys offense only managed to get 8 points and fumbled late in the game, allowing the Panthers to run out the clock. This loss would start the Cowboys season at 0–1.

==== Week 2: vs. New York Giants ====
Week Two: New York Giants at Dallas Cowboys – Game summary

Quarter	1	2	3	4	Total
Giants	0	0	3	10	**13**
**Cowboys**	10	0	3	7	**20**

at AT&T Stadium, Arlington, Texas

- Date: September 16
- Game time: 7:20 p.m. CDT
- Game weather: Played indoors (retractable roof closed)
- Game attendance: 95,512
- Referee: John Parry
- TV announcers (NBC): Al Michaels, Cris Collinsworth, Michele Tafoya, and Terry McAulay
- Recap, Gamebook

Game information

**First quarter**

- DAL – Tavon Austin 64-yard pass from Dak Prescott (Brett Maher kick), 13:37. Cowboys 7–0. **Drive: 3 plays, 75 yards, 1:34.**
- DAL – Brett Maher 37-yard field goal, 6:06. Cowboys 10–0. **Drive: 8 plays, 64 yards, 3:58.**

**Second quarter**

- No scoring plays

**Third quarter**

- DAL – Brett Maher 29-yard field goal, 10:47. Cowboys 13–0. **Drive: 6 plays, 16 yards, 2:39.**
- NYG – Aldrick Rosas 28-yard field goal, 4:34. Cowboys 13–3. **Drive: 11 plays, 66 yards, 6:12.**

**Fourth quarter**

- DAL – Ezekiel Elliott 6-yard run (Brett Maher kick), 5:51. Cowboys 20–3. **Drive: 14 plays, 82 yards, 8:23.**
- NYG – Evan Engram 18-yard pass from Eli Manning (Aldrick Rosas kick), 1:32. Cowboys 20–10. **Drive: 11 plays, 75 yards, 2:09.**
- NYG – Aldrick Rosas 38-yard field goal, 0:15. Cowboys 20–13. **Drive: 8 plays, 33 yards, 1:16.**

**Top passers**

- NYG – Eli Manning – 33/44, 279 yards, TD
- DAL – Dak Prescott – 16/25, 160 yards, TD

**Top rushers**

- NYG – Saquon Barkley – 11 rushes, 28 yards
- DAL – Ezekiel Elliott – 17 rushes, 78 yards, TD

**Top receivers**

- NYG – Saquon Barkley – 14 receptions, 80 yards
- DAL – Tavon Austin – 2 receptions, 79 yards, TD

Dak Prescott threw his first touchdown pass of the year to Tavon Austin from 64 yards out on the 3rd play of the game. Ezekiel Elliott rushed for his second touchdown of the year. Brett Maher made his first two field goals as a Cowboy. The defense recorded 6 sacks and a fumble recovery. This win improved the Cowboys to 1-1.

==== Week 3: at Seattle Seahawks ====
Week Three: Dallas Cowboys at Seattle Seahawks – Game summary

Quarter	1	2	3	4	Total
Cowboys	0	3	3	7	**13**
**Seahawks**	0	17	0	7	**24**

at CenturyLink Field, Seattle, Washington

- Date: September 23
- Game time: 3:25 p.m. CDT/1:25 p.m. PDT
- Game weather: 61 °F (16 °C), sunny
- Game attendance: 69,047
- Referee: Carl Cheffers
- TV announcers (Fox): Joe Buck, Troy Aikman, Erin Andrews, and Mike Pereira
- Recap, Gamebook

Game information

**First quarter**

- No scoring plays.

**Second quarter**

- SEA – Jaron Brown 16-yard pass from Russell Wilson (Sebastian Janikowski kick), 9:28. Seahawks 7–0. **Drive: 10 plays, 64 yards, 3:52.**
- DAL – Brett Maher 50-yard field goal, 5:26. Seahawks 7–3. **Drive: 8 plays, 48 yards, 4:02.**
- SEA – Tyler Lockett 52-yard pass from Russell Wilson (Sebastian Janikowski kick), 1:52. Seahawks 14–3. **Drive: 7 plays, 75 yards, 3:34.**
- SEA – Sebastian Janikowski 47-yard field goal, 0:00. Seahawks 17–3. **Drive: 6 plays, 29 yards, 0:49.**

**Third quarter**

- DAL – Brett Maher 35-yard field goal, 3:43. Seahawks 17–6. **Drive: 9 plays, 54 yards, 5:17.**

**Fourth quarter**

- SEA – Chris Carson 5-yard run (Sebastian Janikowski kick), 12:54. Seahawks 24–6. **Drive: 10 plays, 72 yards, 5:49.**
- DAL – Tavon Austin 3-yard pass from Dak Prescott (Brett Maher kick), 7:11. Seahawks 24–13. **Drive: 5 plays, 57 yards, 1:32.**

**Top passers**

- DAL – Dak Prescott – 19/34, 168 yards, 1 TD, 2 INT
- SEA – Russell Wilson – 16/26, 192 yards, 2 TD

**Top rushers**

- DAL – Ezekiel Elliott – 16 carries, 127 yards
- SEA – Chris Carson – 32 carries, 102 yards, 1 TD

**Top receivers**

- DAL – Geoff Swaim – 5 receptions, 47 yards
- SEA – Tyler Lockett – 4 receptions, 77 yards, 1 TD

The Cowboys struggled in almost all aspects. Dak Prescott threw 2 interceptions and Ezekiel Elliott had a fumble late in the game. The only highlight was a Tavon Austin touchdown. This loss dropped the Cowboys to 1–2 on the season.

==== Week 4: vs. Detroit Lions ====
Week Four: Detroit Lions at Dallas Cowboys – Game summary

Quarter	1	2	3	4	Total
Lions	7	3	0	14	**24**
**Cowboys**	3	10	7	6	**26**

at AT&T Stadium, Arlington, Texas

- Date: September 30
- Game time: 12:00 p.m. CDT
- Game weather: Played indoors (retractable roof closed)
- Game attendance: 90,155
- Referee: Walt Coleman
- TV announcers (Fox): Kevin Burkhardt, Charles Davis, and Pam Oliver
- Recap, Gamebook

Game information

**First quarter**

- DAL – Brett Maher 32-yard field goal, 4:34. **Drive: 7 plays, 76 yards, 2:09.** Cowboys 3–0.
- DET – Golden Tate 45-yard pass from Matthew Stafford (Matt Prater kick), 0:19. **Drive: 9 plays, 77 yards, 4:11.** Lions 7–3.

**Second quarter**

- DAL – Brett Maher 43-yard field goal, 11:06. **Drive: 12 plays, 50 yards, 4:18.** Lions 7–6.
- DET – Matt Prater 33-yard field goal, 2:54. **Drive: 13 plays, 60 yards, 8:11.** Lions 10–6.
- DAL – Ezekiel Elliott 38-yard pass from Dak Prescott (Brett Maher kick), 1:18. **Drive: 4 plays, 75 yards, 1:11.** Cowboys 13–10.

**Third quarter**

- DAL – Geoff Swaim 1-yard pass from Dak Prescott (Brett Maher kick), 3:01. **Drive: 8 plays, 64 yards, 4:03.** Cowboys 20–10.

**Fourth quarter**

- DET – Kerryon Johnson 8-yard run (Matt Prater kick), 14:20. **Drive: 7 plays, 75 yards, 3:39.** Cowboys 20–17.
- DAL – Brett Maher 22-yard field goal, 5:52. **Drive: 16 plays, 85 yards, 8:31.** Cowboys 23–17.
- DET – Golden Tate 38-yard pass from Matthew Stafford (Matt Prater kick), 2:17. **Drive: 6 plays, 75 yards, 3:32.** Lions 24–23.
- DAL – Brett Maher 38-yard field goal, 0:03. **Drive: 9 plays, 55 yards, 2:17.** Cowboys 26–24.

**Top passers**

- DET – Matthew Stafford – 24/30, 307 yards, 2 TD
- DAL – Dak Prescott – 17/27, 255 yards, 2 TD

**Top rushers**

- DET – Kerryon Johnson – 9 carries, 55 yards, TD
- DAL – Ezekiel Elliott – 25 carries, 152 yards

**Top receivers**

- DET – Golden Tate – 8 receptions, 132 yards, 2 TD
- DAL – Ezekiel Elliott – 4 receptions, 88 yards, TD

The Cowboys bounced back from the previous week. Elliott totaled 240 yards and a touchdown. Prescott had 2 passing touchdowns. Geoff Swaim scored the first touchdown of his career. Maher went 4/4 on field goals, including a 38-yarder that won the game as time expired. This win improved the Cowboys to 2–2 on the season.

==== Week 5: at Houston Texans ====
Week Five: Dallas Cowboys at Houston Texans – Game summary

Quarter	1	2	3	4	OT	Total
Cowboys	6	0	7	3	0	**16**
**Texans**	0	10	3	3	3	**19**

at NRG Stadium, Houston, Texas

- Date: October 7
- Game time: 7:20 p.m. CDT
- Game weather: Played indoors (retractable roof closed)
- Game attendance: 72,008
- Referee: Bill Vinovich
- TV announcers (NBC): Al Michaels, Cris Collinsworth, Michele Tafoya, and Terry McAulay
- Recap, Gamebook

Game information

**First quarter**

- DAL – Brett Maher 27-yard field goal, 10:06. Cowboys 3–0. **Drive: 9 plays, 66 yards, 4:54.**
- DAL – Brett Maher 43-yard field goal, 3:13. Cowboys 6–0. **Drive: 5 plays, 37 yards, 2:35.**

**Second quarter**

- HOU – Keke Coutee 1-yard pass from Deshaun Watson (Kaʻimi Fairbairn kick), 13:40. Texans 7–6. **Drive: 8 plays, 70 yards, 4:30.**
- HOU – Kaʻimi Fairbairn 20-yard field goal, 6:03. Texans 10–6. **Drive: 12 plays, 79 yards, 5:54.**

**Third quarter**

- DAL – Allen Hurns 3-yard pass from Dak Prescott (Brett Maher kick), 11:57. Cowboys 13–10. **Drive: 5 plays, 16 yards, 1:59.**
- HOU – Kaʻimi Fairbairn 21-yard field goal, 5:05. Tied 13–13. **Drive: 8 plays, 26 yards, 2:50.**

**Fourth quarter**

- HOU – Kaʻimi Fairbairn 19-yard field goal, 8:34. Texans 16–13. **Drive: 9 plays, 59 yards, 4:55.**
- DAL – Brett Maher 48-yard field goal, 5:43. Tied 16–16. **Drive: 5 plays, 45 yards, 2:48.**

**Overtime**

- HOU – Kaʻimi Fairbairn 36-yard field goal, 1:55. Texans 19–16. **Drive: 8 plays, 72 yards, 3:38.**

**Top passers**

- DAL – Dak Prescott – 18/29, 208 yards, TD, 2 INT
- HOU – Deshaun Watson – 33/44, 375 yards, TD, INT

**Top rushers**

- DAL – Ezekiel Elliott – 20 carries, 54 yards
- HOU – Alfred Blue – 20 carries, 46 yards

**Top receivers**

- DAL – Geoff Swaim – 3 receptions, 55 yards
- HOU – DeAndre Hopkins – 9 receptions, 151 yards

The Cowboys controversially punted in overtime and allowed the Texans to take the ball down the field and win the game. This loss dropped the Cowboys to 2–3.

==== Week 6: vs. Jacksonville Jaguars ====
Week Six: Jacksonville Jaguars at Dallas Cowboys – Game summary

Quarter	1	2	3	4	Total
Jaguars	0	0	7	0	**7**
**Cowboys**	10	14	6	10	**40**

at AT&T Stadium, Arlington, Texas

- Date: October 14
- Game time: 3:25 p.m. CDT
- Game weather: Played indoors (retractable roof closed)
- Game attendance: 90,767
- Referee: Tony Corrente
- TV announcers (CBS): Jim Nantz, Tony Romo, Tracy Wolfson, and Gene Steratore
- Recap, Gamebook

Game information

**First quarter**

- DAL – Brett Maher 50-yard field goal, 8:40. Cowboys 3–0. **Drive: 9 plays, 51 yards, 4:19.**
- DAL – Dak Prescott 17-yard run (Brett Maher kick), 3:52. Cowboys 10–0. **Drive: 7 plays, 48 yards, 3:26.**

**Second quarter**

- DAL – Cole Beasley 17-yard pass from Dak Prescott (Brett Maher kick), 9:34. Cowboys 17–0. **Drive: 9 plays, 84 yards, 4:49.**
- DAL – Cole Beasley 9-yard pass from Dak Prescott (Brett Maher kick), 0:47. Cowboys 24–0. **Drive: 16 plays, 78 yards, 7:14.**

**Third quarter**

- JAX – Dede Westbrook 34-yard pass from Blake Bortles (Josh Lambo kick), 7:39. Cowboys 24–7. **Drive: 8 plays, 82 yards, 3:27.**
- DAL – Brett Maher 46-yard field goal, 3:09. Cowboys 27–7. **Drive: 9 plays, 47 yards, 4:25.**
- DAL – Brett Maher 32-yard field goal, 1:22. Cowboys 30–7. **Drive: 4 plays, -6 yards, 1:31.**

**Fourth quarter**

- DAL – Ezekiel Elliott 15-yard run (Brett Maher kick), 15:00. Cowboys 37–7. **Drive: 2 plays, 31 yards, 1:16.**
- DAL – Brett Maher 55-yard field goal, 7:12. Cowboys 40–7. **Drive: 8 plays, 15 yards, 4:39.**

**Top passers**

- JAX – Blake Bortles – 15/26, 149 yards, TD, INT
- DAL – Dak Prescott – 17/27, 183 yards, 2 TD

**Top rushers**

- JAX – T. J. Yeldon – 8 rushes, 41 yards
- DAL – Ezekiel Elliott – 24 rushes, 106 yards, TD

**Top receivers**

- JAX – Keelan Cole – 4 receptions, 41 yards
- DAL – Cole Beasley – 9 receptions, 101 yards, 2 TD

The Cowboys found their winning ways and got back on track after losing the previous week. The defense got after Blake Bortles and only yielded 7 points. Cole Beasley put up 101 receiving yards and 2 touchdowns. The offense dominated the entire game, and scored 40 points off one of the league's best defenses. This win improved the Cowboys to 3–3 on the season.

==== Week 7: at Washington Redskins ====
Week Seven: Dallas Cowboys at Washington Redskins – Game summary

Quarter	1	2	3	4	Total
Cowboys	0	7	0	10	**17**
**Redskins**	7	0	3	10	**20**

at FedEx Field, Landover, Maryland

- Date: October 21
- Game time: 4:25 p.m. EDT/3:25 p.m. CDT
- Game weather: 52 °F (11 °C), sunny
- Game attendance: 66,301
- Referee: John Hussey
- TV announcers (CBS): Jim Nantz, Tony Romo, Tracy Wolfson, and Gene Steratore
- Recap, Gamebook

Game information

**First quarter**

- WAS – Kapri Bibbs 23-yard pass from Alex Smith (Dustin Hopkins kick), 10:19. Redskins 7–0. **Drive: 6 plays, 52 yards, 3:13.**

**Second quarter**

- DAL – Michael Gallup 49-yard pass from Dak Prescott (Brett Maher kick), 1:00. Tied 7–7. **Drive: 6 plays, 83 yards, 2:46.**

**Third quarter**

- WAS – Dustin Hopkins 21-yard field goal, 9:10. Redskins 10–7. **Drive: 10 plays, 72 yards, 5:50.**

**Fourth quarter**

- WAS – Dustin Hopkins 25-yard field goal, 12:35. Redskins 13–7. **Drive: 8 plays, 44 yards, 4:48.**
- DAL – Brett Maher 47-yard field goal, 9:46. Redskins 13–10. **Drive: 6 plays, 46 yards, 2:49.**
- WAS – Preston Smith 1-yard fumble return (Dustin Hopkins kick), 4:55. Redskins 20–10.
- DAL – Dak Prescott 1-yard run (Brett Maher kick), 1:37. Redskins 20–17. **Drive: 12 plays, 74 yards, 3:18.**

**Top passers**

- DAL – Dak Prescott – 22/35, 273 yards, 1 TD
- WAS – Alex Smith – 14/25, 178 yards, 1 TD

**Top rushers**

- DAL – Ezekiel Elliott – 15 carries, 33 yards
- WAS – Adrian Peterson – 24 carries, 99 yards

**Top receivers**

- DAL – Cole Beasley – 7 receptions, 56 yards
- WAS – Kapri Bibbs – 4 receptions, 43 yards, 1 TD

Brett Maher attempted to kick a 52-yard field goal in the dying seconds to tie the game, but it hit the left upright. This loss dropped them to 3–4.

==== Week 9: vs. Tennessee Titans ====
Week Nine: Tennessee Titans at Dallas Cowboys – Game summary

Quarter	1	2	3	4	Total
**Titans**	0	14	7	7	**28**
Cowboys	7	7	0	0	**14**

at AT&T Stadium, Arlington, Texas

- Date: November 5
- Game time: 7:15 p.m. CST
- Game weather: Played indoors (retractable roof closed)
- Game attendance: 90,466
- Referee: Clete Blakeman
- TV announcers (ESPN): Joe Tessitore, Jason Witten, Booger McFarland, and Lisa Salters
- Recap, Gamebook

Game information

**First quarter**

- DAL – Amari Cooper 4-yard pass from Dak Prescott (Brett Maher kick), 6:12. Cowboys 7–0. **Drive: 4 plays, 15 yards, 1:56.**

**Second quarter**

- TEN – Derrick Henry 1-yard run (Ryan Succop kick), 9:35. Tied 7–7. **Drive: 15 plays, 85 yards, 8:55.**
- TEN – Dion Lewis 18-yard pass from Marcus Mariota (Ryan Succop kick), 4:11. Titans 14–7. **Drive: 7 plays, 69 yards, 3:38.**
- DAL – Allen Hurns 23-yard pass from Dak Prescott (Brett Maher kick), 0:39. Tied 14–14. **Drive: 10 plays, 78 yards, 3:32.**

**Third quarter**

- TEN – Jonnu Smith 7-yard pass from Marcus Mariota (Ryan Succop kick), 5:44. Titans 21–14. **Drive: 7 plays, 40 yards, 3:18.**

**Fourth quarter**

- TEN – Marcus Mariota 9-yard run (Ryan Succop kick), 4:38. Titans 28–14. **Drive: 8 plays, 64 yards, 4:08.**

**Top passers**

- TEN – Marcus Mariota – 21/29, 240 yards, 2 TD
- DAL – Dak Prescott – 21/31, 243 yards, 2 TD, INT

**Top rushers**

- TEN – Dion Lewis – 19 carries, 62 yards
- DAL – Ezekiel Elliott – 17 carries, 61 yards

**Top receivers**

- TEN – Dion Lewis – 4 receptions, 60 yards, TD
- DAL – Amari Cooper – 5 receptions, 58 yards, TD

This was Amari Cooper's first game as a Cowboy as he was traded from the Oakland Raiders for a first-round pick, but the Titans pulled away late and won the game. This loss dropped them to 3–5 on the season.

This was also Jason Witten's first return to AT&T Stadium. Witten played as a tight-end for the Dallas Cowboys for some part of the 2000s and much of the 2010s.

==== Week 10: at Philadelphia Eagles ====
Week Ten: Dallas Cowboys at Philadelphia Eagles – Game summary

Quarter	1	2	3	4	Total
**Cowboys**	3	10	0	14	**27**
Eagles	0	3	10	7	**20**

at Lincoln Financial Field, Philadelphia, Pennsylvania

- Date: November 11
- Game time: 8:20 p.m. EST/7:20 p.m. CST
- Game weather: 38 °F (3 °C), clear
- Game attendance: 69,696
- Referee: John Parry
- TV announcers (NBC): Al Michaels, Cris Collinsworth, Michele Tafoya, and Terry McAulay
- Recap, Gamebook

Game information

**First quarter**

- DAL – Brett Maher 25-yard field goal, 6:59. Cowboys 3–0. **Drive: 9 plays, 31 yards, 3:46.**

**Second quarter**

- DAL – Brett Maher 31-yard field goal, 3:41. Cowboys 6–0. **Drive: 14 plays, 64 yards, 8:09.**
- PHI – Jake Elliott 56-yard field goal, 1:33. Cowboys 6–3. **Drive: 8 plays, 35 yards, 2:08.**
- DAL – Dak Prescott 1-yard run (Brett Maher kick), 0:19. Cowboys 13–3. **Drive: 8 plays, 75 yards, 1:14.**

**Third quarter**

- PHI – Jake Elliott 26-yard field goal, 9:36. Cowboys 13–6. **Drive: 8 plays, 47 yards, 3:21.**
- PHI – Zach Ertz 15-yard pass from Carson Wentz (Jake Elliott kick), 2:08. Tied 13–13. **Drive: 10 plays, 68 yards, 5:31.**

**Fourth quarter**

- DAL – Ezekiel Elliott 7-yard pass from Dak Prescott (Brett Maher kick), 11:42. Cowboys 20–13. **Drive: 9 plays, 75 yards, 5:26.**
- PHI – Zach Ertz 1-yard pass from Carson Wentz (Jake Elliott kick), 7:27. Tied 20–20. **Drive: 7 plays, 74 yards, 4:15.**
- DAL – Ezekiel Elliott 1-yard run (Brett Maher kick), 3:19. Cowboys 27–20. **Drive: 8 plays, 75 yards, 4:08.**

**Top passers**

- DAL – Dak Prescott – 26/36, 270 yards, TD
- PHI – Carson Wentz – 32/44, 360 yards, 2 TD, INT

**Top rushers**

- DAL – Ezekiel Elliott – 19 carries, 151 yards, TD
- PHI – Josh Adams – 7 carries, 47 yards

**Top receivers**

- DAL – Amari Cooper – 6 receptions, 75 yards
- PHI – Zach Ertz – 14 receptions, 145 yards, 2 TD

In desperate need of a road win to keep their season alive, the game began with Leighton Vander Esch picking off Carson Wentz. The game would be neck-to-neck without the Cowboys trailing. As they led 27–20 on the last play, the ball was lateraled to Golden Tate, but was stopped in progress to allow the Cowboys to win. This win not only improved them to 4–5, but it also improved their chances of being contenders.

==== Week 11: at Atlanta Falcons ====
Week Eleven: Dallas Cowboys at Atlanta Falcons – Game summary

Quarter	1	2	3	4	Total
**Cowboys**	3	0	3	16	**22**
Falcons	0	6	3	10	**19**

at Mercedes-Benz Stadium, Atlanta, Georgia

- Date: November 18
- Game time: 1:00 p.m. EST/12:00 p.m. CST
- Game weather: 59 °F (15 °C), sunny — retractable roof open
- Game attendance: 74,447
- Referee: Craig Wrolstad
- TV announcers (Fox): Kevin Burkhardt, Charles Davis, and Pam Oliver
- Recap, Gamebook

Game information

**First quarter**

- DAL – Brett Maher 21-yard field goal, 3:00. Cowboys 3–0. **Drive: 15 plays, 85 yards, 7:23.**

**Second quarter**

- ATL – Matt Bryant 41-yard field goal, 14:56. Tied 3–3. **Drive: 7 plays, 52 yards, 3:04.**
- ATL – Matt Bryant 45-yard field goal, 0:34. Falcons 6–3. **Drive: 10 plays, 33 yards, 4:13.**

**Third quarter**

- DAL – Brett Maher 50-yard field goal, 10:20. Tied 6–6. **Drive: 8 plays, 43 yards, 4:45.**
- ATL – Matt Bryant 53-yard field goal, 7:16. Falcons 9–6. **Drive: 7 plays, 47 yards, 3:03.**

**Fourth quarter**

- DAL – Dak Prescott 4-yard run (kick failed), 14:23. Cowboys 12–9. **Drive: 14 plays, 75 yards, 7:53.**
- DAL – Ezekiel Elliott 23-yard run (Brett Maher kick), 12:33. Cowboys 19–9. **Drive: 2 plays, 31 yards, 0:41.**
- ATL – Matt Bryant 21-yard field goal, 8:28. Cowboys 19–12. **Drive: 9 plays, 72 yards, 4:00.**
- ATL – Julio Jones 34-yard pass from Matt Ryan (Matt Bryant kick), 1:52. Tied 19–19. **Drive: 6 plays, 68 yards, 2:10.**
- DAL – Brett Maher 42-yard field goal, 0:00. Cowboys 22–19. **Drive: 10 plays, 51 yards, 1:52.**

**Top passers**

- DAL – Dak Prescott – 22/32, 208 yards
- ATL – Matt Ryan – 24/34, 291 yards, TD, INT

**Top rushers**

- DAL – Ezekiel Elliott – 23 rushes, 122 yards, TD
- ATL – Tevin Coleman – 8 rushes, 58 yards

**Top receivers**

- DAL – Ezekiel Elliott – 7 receptions, 79 yards
- ATL – Julio Jones – 6 receptions, 118 yards, TD

Brett Maher kicked a game-winning field goal as time expired. The Cowboys improved to 5–5 with this win. Rookie linebacker Leighton Vander Esch put up a stellar performance with his 2nd interception in two weeks, which set up a crucial Ezekiel Elliott touchdown run. This was the Cowboys first win over the Falcons since 2009, and first in Atlanta since 2006.

==== Week 12: vs. Washington Redskins ====
NFL on Thanksgiving Day

Week Twelve: Washington Redskins at Dallas Cowboys – Game summary

Quarter	1	2	3	4	Total
Redskins	0	7	6	10	**23**
**Cowboys**	7	3	14	7	**31**

at AT&T Stadium, Arlington, Texas

- Date: November 22
- Game time: 3:30 p.m. CST
- Game weather: Played indoors (retractable roof closed)
- Game attendance: 92,076
- Referee: Ronald Torbert
- TV announcers (Fox): Joe Buck, Troy Aikman, Erin Andrews, Kristina Pink, and Mike Pereira
- Recap, Gamebook

Game information

**First quarter**

- DAL – Ezekiel Elliott 16-yard rush (Brett Maher kick), 10:02. Cowboys 7–0. **Drive: 10 plays, 75 yards, 4:58.**

**Second quarter**

- WAS – Vernon Davis 53-yard pass from Colt McCoy (Dustin Hopkins kick), 7:04. Tied 7–7. **Drive: 1 play, 53 yards, 0:08.**
- DAL – Brett Maher 28-yard field goal, 1:28. Cowboys 10–7. **Drive: 14 plays, 65 yards, 5:36.**

**Third quarter**

- WAS – Trey Quinn 10-yard pass from Colt McCoy (kick failed), 9:02. Redskins 13–10. **Drive: 3 plays, 25 yards, 1:29.**
- DAL – Amari Cooper 40-yard pass from Dak Prescott (Brett Maher kick), 6:47. Cowboys 17–13. **Drive: 6 plays, 75 yards, 2:15.**
- DAL – Amari Cooper 90-yard pass from Dak Prescott (Brett Maher kick), 2:10. Cowboys 24–13. **Drive: 2 plays, 91 yards, 0:55.**

**Fourth quarter**

- DAL – Dak Prescott 5-yard rush (Brett Maher kick), 14:11. Cowboys 31–13. **Drive: 5 plays, 17 yards, 2:20.**
- WAS – Kapri Bibbs 1-yard rush (Dustin Hopkins kick), 11:43. Cowboys 31–20. **Drive: 6 plays, 44 yards, 2:28.**
- WAS – Dustin Hopkins 31-yard field goal, 1:13. Cowboys 31–23. **Drive: 11 plays, 41 yards, 2:37.**

**Top passers**

- WAS – Colt McCoy – 24/38, 268 yards, 2 TD, 3 INT
- DAL – Dak Prescott – 22/31, 289 yards, 2 TD

**Top rushers**

- WAS – Adrian Peterson – 12 carries, 35 yards
- DAL – Ezekiel Elliott – 26 carries, 121 yards, TD

**Top receivers**

- WAS – Jordan Reed – 6 receptions, 75 yards
- DAL – Amari Cooper – 8 receptions, 180 yards, 2 TD

The Cowboys got revenge on their division rivals during the game. Dak Prescott connected with Amari Cooper for a 90-yard catch and run touchdown in the third quarter. With the win, the Cowboys moved to 6-5 and gained possession of first place in the NFC East.

==== Week 13: vs. New Orleans Saints ====
Week Thirteen: New Orleans Saints at Dallas Cowboys – Game summary

Quarter	1	2	3	4	Total
Saints	0	0	10	0	**10**
**Cowboys**	10	3	0	0	**13**

at AT&T Stadium, Arlington, Texas

- Date: November 29
- Game time: 7:20 p.m. CST
- Game weather: 70 °F (21 °C), clear — retractable roof open
- Game attendance: 93,004
- Referee: Walt Anderson
- TV announcers (Fox/NFLN): Joe Buck, Troy Aikman, Erin Andrews, Kristina Pink, and Mike Pereira
- Recap, Gamebook

Game information

First quarter

- DAL – Brett Maher 26-yard field goal, 9:27. Cowboys 3–0. **Drive: 12 plays, 67 yards, 5:36.**
- DAL – Ezekiel Elliott 16-yard pass from Dak Prescott (Brett Maher kick), 0:57. Cowboys 10–0. **Drive: 8 plays, 85 yards, 4:10.**

Second quarter

- DAL – Brett Maher 46-yard field goal, 0:55. Cowboys 13–0. **Drive: 16 plays, 70 yards, 9:09.**

Third quarter

- NO – Wil Lutz 33-yard field goal, 10:03. Cowboys 13–3. **Drive: 10 plays, 60 yards, 5:00.**
- NO – Keith Kirkwood 30-yard pass from Drew Brees (Wil Lutz kick), 1:08. Cowboys 13–10. **Drive: 10 plays, 88 yards, 4:39.**

Fourth quarter

- No scoring plays.

**Top passers**

- NO – Drew Brees – 18/28, 127 yards, TD, INT
- DAL – Dak Prescott – 24/28, 248 yards, TD

**Top rushers**

- NO – Alvin Kamara – 11 carries, 36 yards
- DAL – Ezekiel Elliott – 23 carries, 76 yards

**Top receivers**

- NO – Michael Thomas – 5 receptions, 40 yards
- DAL – Michael Gallup – 5 receptions, 76 yards

The Cowboys defense shut down Drew Brees and the Saints red hot offense, limiting their offense to a season low 10 points and upsetting the Saints. Jourdan Lewis made the game-clinching interception with only 2:08 left to play in 4th quarter to seal the victory. This win improved the Cowboys to 7–5 on the season.

==== Week 14: vs. Philadelphia Eagles ====
Week Fourteen: Philadelphia Eagles at Dallas Cowboys – Game summary

Quarter	1	2	3	4	OT	Total
Eagles	0	0	6	17	0	**23**
**Cowboys**	3	3	3	14	6	**29**

at AT&T Stadium, Arlington, Texas

- Date: December 9
- Game time: 3:25 p.m. CST
- Game weather: Played indoors (retractable roof closed)
- Game attendance: 93,127
- Referee: Clete Blakeman
- TV announcers (Fox): Joe Buck, Troy Aikman, Erin Andrews, and Mike Pereira
- Recap, Gamebook

Game information

**First quarter**

- DAL – Brett Maher 28-yard field goal, 2:25. Cowboys 3–0. **Drive: 13 plays, 80 yards, 6:58.**

**Second quarter**

- DAL – Brett Maher 62-yard field goal, 0:00. Cowboys 6–0. **Drive: 7 plays, 18 yards, 0:52.**

**Third quarter**

- DAL – Brett Maher 21-yard field goal, 8:59. Cowboys 9–0. **Drive: 9 plays, 51 yards, 4:26.**
- PHI – Alshon Jeffery 2-yard pass from Carson Wentz (kick failed), 6:04. Cowboys 9–6. **Drive: 1 plays, 2 yards, 0:04.**

**Fourth quarter**

- PHI – Jake Elliott 26-yard field goal, 12:11. Tied 9–9. **Drive: 10 plays, 47 yards, 4:53.**
- DAL – Amari Cooper 28-yard pass from Dak Prescott (Brett Maher kick), 7:46. Cowboys 16–9. **Drive: 9 plays, 75 yards, 4:25.**
- PHI – Dallas Goedert 3-yard pass from Carson Wentz (Jake Elliott kick), 3:12. Tied 16–16. **Drive: 4 plays, 47 yards, 2:13.**
- DAL – Amari Cooper 75-yard pass from Dak Prescott (Brett Maher kick), 3:01. Cowboys 23–16. **Drive: 1 plays, 75 yards, 0:11.**
- PHI – Darren Sproles 6-yard pass from Carson Wentz (Jake Elliott kick), 1:39. Tied 23–23. **Drive: 6 plays, 75 yards, 1:22.**

**Overtime**

- DAL – Amari Cooper 15-yard pass from Dak Prescott, 1:55. Cowboys 29–23. **Drive: 13 plays, 75 yards, 8:05.**

**Top passers**

- PHI – Carson Wentz – 22/32, 228 yards, 3 TD
- DAL – Dak Prescott – 42/54, 455 yards, 3 TD, 2 INT

**Top rushers**

- PHI – Josh Adams – 7 rushes, 36 yards
- DAL – Ezekiel Elliott – 28 rushes, 113 yards

**Top receivers**

- PHI – Alshon Jeffery – 6 receptions, 50 yards, TD
- DAL – Amari Cooper – 10 receptions, 217 yards, 3 TD

After a grueling back-and-forth match, the Cowboys won in overtime. This was their 1st overtime victory since the 2016 season, which was, coincidentally, also a 29–23 home win against the Eagles. Brett Maher made a successful 62-yard field goal attempt, which was a franchise record for Dallas and tied for the third longest in NFL history. Amari Cooper had his best game as a Cowboy thus far, catching 10 passes for 217 yards and 3 touchdowns.

With the win, the Cowboys improved to 8–5, extended their lead in the NFC East to 2 games, and swept the Eagles for the first time since 2012.

==== Week 15: at Indianapolis Colts ====
Week Fifteen: Dallas Cowboys at Indianapolis Colts – Game summary

Quarter	1	2	3	4	Total
Cowboys	0	0	0	0	**0**
**Colts**	7	3	10	3	**23**

at Lucas Oil Stadium, Indianapolis, Indiana

- Date: December 16
- Game time: 1:00 p.m. EST/12:00 p.m. CST
- Game weather: Played indoors (retractable roof closed)
- Game attendance: 66,654
- Referee: Carl Cheffers
- TV announcers (Fox): Kevin Burkhardt, Charles Davis, and Pam Oliver
- Recap, Gamebook

Game information

**First quarter**

- IND – Marlon Mack 1-yard rush (Adam Vinatieri kick), 6:09. Colts 7–0. **Drive: 8 plays, 44 yards, 3:46.**

**Second quarter**

- IND – Adam Vinatieri 43-yard field goal, 0:00. Colts 10–0. **Drive: 11 plays, 59 yards, 1:53.**

**Third quarter**

- IND – Marlon Mack 6-yard rush (Adam Vinatieri kick), 11:23. Colts 17–0. **Drive: 8 plays, 75 yards, 3:37.**
- IND – Adam Vinatieri 44-yard field goal, 1:36. Colts 20–0. **Drive: 10 plays, 63 yards, 6:09.**

**Fourth quarter**

- IND – Adam Vinatieri 23-yard field goal, 6:57. Colts 23–0. **Drive: 12 plays, 55 yards, 7:59.**

**Top passers**

- DAL – Dak Prescott – 24/39, 206 yards, INT
- IND – Andrew Luck – 16/27, 192 yards

**Top rushers**

- DAL – Ezekiel Elliott – 18 carries, 87 yards
- IND – Marlon Mack – 27 carries, 139 yards, 2 TD

**Top receivers**

- DAL – Blake Jarwin – 4 receptions, 45 yards
- IND – T. Y. Hilton – 5 receptions, 85 yards

The Cowboys were shut out for the first time since 2003, the offense couldn't keep up with the Colts defense. This loss dropped the Cowboys to 8–6 on the season.

==== Week 16: vs. Tampa Bay Buccaneers ====
Week Sixteen: Tampa Bay Buccaneers at Dallas Cowboys – Game summary

Quarter	1	2	3	4	Total
Buccaneers	3	10	0	7	**20**
**Cowboys**	14	3	10	0	**27**

at AT&T Stadium, Arlington, Texas

- Date: December 23
- Game time: 12:00 p.m. CST
- Game weather: Played indoors (retractable roof closed)
- Game attendance: 92,851
- Referee: Shawn Hochuli
- TV announcers (Fox): Joe Buck, Troy Aikman, Erin Andrews, and Mike Pereira
- Recap, Gamebook

Game information

**First quarter**

- TB – Cairo Santos 37-yard field goal, 12:12. Buccaneers 3–0. **Drive: 7 plays, 45 yards, 2:52.**
- DAL – Dak Prescott 7-yard run (Brett Maher kick), 7:12. Cowboys 7–3. **Drive: 8 plays, 75 yards, 5:01.**
- DAL – Jaylon Smith 69-yard fumble return (Brett Maher kick), 1:57. Cowboys 14–3.

**Second quarter**

- TB – Cairo Santos 45-yard field goal, 9:19. Cowboys 14–6. **Drive: 14 plays, 44 yards, 7:28.**
- DAL – Brett Maher 59-yard field goal, 1:48. Cowboys 17–6. **Drive: 4 plays, 5 yards, 0:26.**
- TB – Jacquizz Rodgers 2-yard run (Cairo Santos kick), 0:25. Cowboys 17–13. **Drive: 8 plays, 75 yards, 1:23.**

**Third quarter**

- DAL – Brett Maher 20-yard field goal, 3:44. Cowboys 20–13. **Drive: 12 plays, 56 yards, 6:59.**
- DAL – Michael Gallup 4-yard pass from Dak Prescott (Brett Maher kick), 2:27. Cowboys 27–13. **Drive: 2 plays, 4 yards, 0:09.**

**Fourth quarter**

- TB – Mike Evans 7-yard pass from Jameis Winston (Cairo Santos kick), 2:12. Cowboys 27–20. **Drive: 8 plays, 71 yards, 2:23.**

**Top passers**

- TB – Jameis Winston – 34/48, 336 yards, TD
- DAL – Dak Prescott – 20/25, 161 yards, TD

**Top rushers**

- TB – Peyton Barber – 17 rushes, 43 yards
- DAL – Ezekiel Elliott – 18 rushes, 85 yards

**Top receivers**

- TB – Mike Evans – 6 receptions, 90 yards, TD
- DAL – Michael Gallup – 3 receptions, 53 yards, TD

The Cowboys bounced back at home against the Buccaneers. Jaylon Smith made the highlight play of the game, recovering a fumble from Jameis Winston and returning it 69 yards for a touchdown. With this win, the Cowboys improved to 9–6 on the season and clinched the NFC East for the third time in 5 years.

==== Week 17: at New York Giants ====
Week Seventeen: Dallas Cowboys at New York Giants – Game summary

Quarter	1	2	3	4	Total
**Cowboys**	0	14	7	15	**36**
Giants	0	7	11	17	**35**

at MetLife Stadium, East Rutherford, New Jersey

- Date: December 30
- Game time: 1:00 p.m. EST/12:00 p.m. CST
- Game weather: 37 °F (3 °C), cloudy
- Game attendance: 77,750
- Referee: Clay Martin
- TV announcers (Fox): Kevin Burkhardt, Charles Davis, and Pam Oliver
- Recap, Gamebook

Game information

**First quarter**

- No scoring plays.

**Second quarter**

- DAL – Blake Jarwin 13-yard pass from Dak Prescott (Brett Maher kick), 8:17. Cowboys 7–0. **Drive: 13 plays, 65 yards, 6:37.**
- DAL – Blake Jarwin 19-yard pass from Dak Prescott (Brett Maher kick), 1:55. Cowboys 14–0. **Drive: 9 plays, 75 yards, 5:24.**
- NYG – Cody Latimer 21-yard pass from Eli Manning (Aldrick Rosas kick), 0:22. Cowboys 14–7. **Drive: 10 plays, 73 yards, 1:35.**

**Third quarter**

- NYG – Aldrick Rosas 48-yard field goal, 9:05. Cowboys 14–10. **Drive: 8 plays, 15 yards, 4:10.**
- DAL – Blake Jarwin 39-yard pass from Dak Prescott (Brett Maher kick), 5:10. Cowboys 21–10. **Drive: 8 plays, 76 yards, 4:00.**
- NYG – Evan Engram 6-yard pass from Eli Manning (Eli Manning-Evan Engram pass), 2:00. Cowboys 21–18. **Drive: 5 plays, 73 yards, 3:07.**

**Fourth quarter**

- NYG – Wayne Gallman 2-yard run (Aldrick Rosas kick), 10:43. Giants 25–21. **Drive: 8 plays, 81 yards, 4:14.**
- DAL – Rod Smith 1-yard run (Brett Maher kick), 9:16. Cowboys 28–25. **Drive: 5 plays, 75 yards, 1:27.**
- NYG – Saquon Barkley 2-yard run (Aldrick Rosas kick), 3:27. Giants 32–28. **Drive: 12 plays, 74 yards, 5:50.**
- NYG – Aldrick Rosas 38-yard field goal, 2:39. Giants 35–28. **Drive: 4 plays, -2 yards, 0:34.**
- DAL – Cole Beasley 32-yard pass from Dak Prescott (Dak Prescott-Michael Gallup pass), 1:19. Cowboys 36–35. **Drive: 9 plays, 70 yards, 1:23.**

**Top passers**

- DAL – Dak Prescott – 27/44, 387 yards, 4 TD
- NYG – Eli Manning – 24/41, 301 yards, 2 TD, INT

**Top rushers**

- DAL – Rod Smith – 12 rushes, 35 yards, TD
- NYG – Saquon Barkley – 17 rushes, 109 yards, TD

**Top receivers**

- DAL – Blake Jarwin – 7 receptions, 119 yards, 3 TD
- NYG – Evan Engram – 5 receptions, 81 yards, TD

The Cowboys earned a hard-fought win. The defense picked off two passes from Eli Manning while forcing a fumble for a turnover. Blake Jarwin had the best game of his career, accounting for 3 of the Cowboys' touchdowns. The Cowboys won the game after a game-winning touchdown pass from Dak Prescott to Cole Beasley along with the ensuing 2-point conversion from Prescott to Michael Gallup. With this win, the Cowboys finished 10–6. This marks the first time the Cowboys have recorded 3 consecutive winning seasons since they did so from 2007 to 2009.

=== Standings ===
==== Division ====
NFC East
	W	L	T	PCT	DIV	CONF	PF	PA	STK
^{(4)} Dallas Cowboys	10	6	0	.625	5–1	9–3	339	324	W2
^{(6)} Philadelphia Eagles	9	7	0	.563	4–2	6–6	367	348	W3
Washington Redskins	7	9	0	.438	2–4	6–6	281	359	L2
New York Giants	5	11	0	.313	1–5	4–8	369	412	L3

==== Conference ====
NFC
#	Team	Division	W	L	T	PCT	DIV	CONF	SOS	SOV	STK
**Division leaders**
1 (Note: New Orleans finished ahead of LA Rams based on head-to-head victory, claiming the No. 1 seed.)	New Orleans Saints	South	13	3	0	.813	4–2	9–3	.482	.488	L1
2	Los Angeles Rams	West	13	3	0	.813	6–0	9–3	.480	.428	W2
3	Chicago Bears	North	12	4	0	.750	5–1	10–2	.430	.419	W4
4	Dallas Cowboys	East	10	6	0	.625	5–1	9–3	.488	.444	W2
**Wild Cards**
5	Seattle Seahawks	West	10	6	0	.625	3–3	8–4	.484	.400	W2
6	Philadelphia Eagles	East	9	7	0	.563	4–2	6–6	.518	.486	W3
**Did not qualify for the postseason**
7	Minnesota Vikings	North	8	7	1	.531	3–2–1	6–5–1	.504	.355	L1
8 (Note: Atlanta finished ahead of Washington based on head-to-head victory. Atlanta finished ahead of Carolina based on head-to-head sweep. Washington finished ahead of Carolina based on head-to-head victory.)	Atlanta Falcons	South	7	9	0	.438	4–2	7–5	.482	.348	W3
9	Washington Redskins	East	7	9	0	.438	2–4	6–6	.486	.371	L2
10	Carolina Panthers	South	7	9	0	.438	2–4	5–7	.508	.518	W1
11	Green Bay Packers	North	6	9	1	.406	1–4–1	3–8–1	.488	.417	L1
12	Detroit Lions	North	6	10	0	.375	2–4	4–8	.504	.427	W1
13 (Note: NY Giants finished ahead of Tampa Bay based on head-to-head victory.)	New York Giants	East	5	11	0	.313	1–5	4–8	.527	.487	L3
14	Tampa Bay Buccaneers	South	5	11	0	.313	2–4	4–8	.523	.506	L4
15	San Francisco 49ers	West	4	12	0	.250	1–5	2–10	.504	.406	L2
16	Arizona Cardinals	West	3	13	0	.188	2–4	3–9	.527	.302	L4
**Tiebreakers** (Note: When breaking ties for three or more teams under the NFL's rules, they are first broken within divisions, then comparing only the highest-ranked remaining team from each division.)

== Postseason ==
Playoff round	Date	Opponent	Final score	Record	Game site	NFL.com recap
Wild Card	January 5, 2019	Seattle Seahawks (5)	W 24–22	1–0	AT&T Stadium	Recap
Divisional	January 12, 2019	at Los Angeles Rams (2)	L 22–30	1–1	Los Angeles Memorial Coliseum	Recap

=== NFC Wild Card Playoffs: vs. (5) Seattle Seahawks ===
NFC Wild Card Playoffs: (5) Seattle Seahawks at (4) Dallas Cowboys – game summary

Quarter	1	2	3	4	Total
Seahawks	0	6	8	8	22
Cowboys	3	7	0	14	24

at AT&T Stadium, Arlington, Texas

- Date: January 5, 2019
- Game time: 7:15 p.m. CST
- Game weather: Played indoors (retractable roof closed)
- Game attendance: 94,327
- Referee: Walt Anderson
- TV announcers (Fox): Joe Buck, Troy Aikman, Erin Andrews and Chris Myers
- Recap, Gamebook

Game information

First quarter

- DAL – Brett Maher 39-yard field goal, 9:54. Cowboys 3–0. Drive: 10 plays, 54 yards, 5:10.

Second quarter

- SEA – Sebastian Janikowski 27-yard field goal, 7:05. Tied 3–3. Drive: 6 plays, 69 yards, 2:45.
- SEA – Sebastian Janikowski 42-yard field goal, 1:47. Seahawks 6–3. Drive: 6 plays, 28 yards, 1:29.
- DAL – Michael Gallup 11-yard pass from Dak Prescott (Brett Maher kick), 0:28. Cowboys 10–6. Drive: 7 plays, 75 yards, 1:19.

Third quarter

- SEA – Russell Wilson 4-yard run (Mike Davis run), 2:03. Seahawks 14–10. Drive: 9 plays, 44 yards, 5:01.

Fourth quarter

- DAL – Ezekiel Elliott 1-yard run (Brett Maher kick), 12:32. Cowboys 17–14. Drive: 9 plays, 67 yards, 4:31.
- DAL – Dak Prescott 1-yard run (Brett Maher kick), 2:14. Cowboys 24–14. Drive: 11 plays, 63 yards, 5:12.
- SEA – J. D. McKissic 7-yard pass from Russell Wilson (Chris Carson run), 1:22. Cowboys 24–22. Drive: 6 plays, 75 yards, 0:50.

Top passers

- SEA – Russell Wilson – 18/27, 233 yards, TD
- DAL – Dak Prescott – 22/33, 226 yards, TD, INT

Top rushers

- SEA – Rashaad Penny – 4 rushes, 29 yards
- DAL – Ezekiel Elliott – 26 rushes, 137 yards, TD

Top receivers

- SEA – Tyler Lockett – 4 receptions, 120 yards
- DAL – Amari Cooper – 7 receptions, 106 yards

The Dallas Cowboys received the ball first after the Seattle Seahawks chose to defer during the coin toss. The resulting drive ended in a Brett Maher 39 yard field goal. The next three drives for both teams ended in punts. However, the Seahawks responded with a 27-yard Sebastian Janikowski field goal, thanks to 66 yards passing by Russell Wilson on the drive. After a missed 57 yard field goal by Maher, Seattle responded by a Janikowski 42 yard field goal. Dallas responded by a 75-yard drive which culminated in an 11-yard touchdown pass by Dak Prescott to Michael Gallup to lead 10–6. After both teams exchanged punts twice, Russell Wilson ran 4 yards into the end zone and converted a two-point conversion to lead the Cowboys 14–10. The Cowboys responded with an Ezekiel Elliott 1 yard touchdown run to retake the lead 17–14. After another Dallas touchdown drive, highlighted by a 16-yard Prescott scramble at 3rd-and-14 followed by Prescott scoring on a 1-yard run, Seattle responded with a touchdown and two-point conversion to narrow Dallas's lead to 24–22. The Cowboys sealed the game when Cole Beasley recovered an onside kick attempt of the Seahawks with only 1:17 left in the game. Ezekiel Elliott totaled a combined 169 yards both through the air and on the ground and also scored a touchdown.

With this win, the Cowboys won their first playoff game since 2014 and advanced to the divisional round. This is also the first playoff victory of the Dak Prescott and Ezekiel Elliott era.

The game saw wide receiver Allen Hurns suffer a significant leg and ankle injury halfway through the first quarter, suffered after a reception when he was tackled by Seahawks safety Bradley McDougald. Hurns was carted off the field and taken straight to a hospital. After the game, it was revealed that Hurns had broken his ankle and fibula.

As of the 2025 season, this represents the most recent home playoff win for the Cowboys, as well as Dallas's most recent playoff win against a team that held a winning record.

=== NFC Divisional Playoffs: at (2) Los Angeles Rams ===
NFC Divisional Playoffs: (4) Dallas Cowboys at (2) Los Angeles Rams – game summary

Quarter	1	2	3	4	Total
Cowboys	7	0	8	7	22
Rams	3	17	3	7	30

at Los Angeles Memorial Coliseum, Los Angeles, California

- Date: January 12, 2019
- Game time: 7:15 p.m. CST/5:15 p.m. PST
- Game weather: 57 °F (14 °C), cloudy
- Game attendance: 77,187
- Referee: John Parry
- TV announcers (Fox): Joe Buck, Troy Aikman, Erin Andrews and Chris Myers
- Recap, Gamebook

Game information

First quarter

- LA – Greg Zuerlein 25-yard field goal, 9:44. Rams 3–0. Drive: 11 plays, 68 yards, 5:16.
- DAL – Amari Cooper 29-yard pass from Dak Prescott (Brett Maher kick), 6:03. Cowboys 7–3. Drive: 7 plays, 71 yards, 3:41.

Second quarter

- LA – Greg Zuerlein 23-yard field goal, 13:40. Cowboys 7–6. Drive: 16 plays, 70 yards, 7:23.
- LA – C. J. Anderson 1-yard run (Greg Zuerlein kick), 7:00. Rams 13–7. Drive: 9 plays, 76 yards, 4:20.
- LA – Todd Gurley 35-yard run (Greg Zuerlein kick), 3:27. Rams 20–7. Drive: 6 plays, 64 yards, 2:38.

Third quarter

- LA – Greg Zuerlein 44-yard field goal, 10:03. Rams 23–7. Drive: 8 plays, 48 yards, 4:04.
- DAL – Ezekiel Elliott 1-yard run (Dak Prescott–Amari Cooper pass), 5:20. Rams 23–15. Drive: 9 plays, 75 yards, 4:43.

Fourth quarter

- LA – C. J. Anderson 1-yard run (Greg Zuerlein kick), 7:16. Rams 30–15. Drive: 12 plays, 65 yards, 7:36.
- DAL – Dak Prescott 1-yard run (Brett Maher kick), 2:11. Rams 30–22. Drive: 12 plays, 75 yards, 5:05.

Top passers

- DAL – Dak Prescott – 20/32, 266 yards, TD
- LA – Jared Goff – 15/28, 186 yards

Top rushers

- DAL – Ezekiel Elliott – 20 rushes, 47 yards, TD
- LA – C. J. Anderson – 23 rushes, 123 yards, 2 TD

Top receivers

- DAL – Michael Gallup – 6 receptions, 119 yards
- LA – Robert Woods – 6 receptions, 69 yards

The Cowboys defense couldn't contain the Rams' offense. Ezekiel Elliott only got 47 rushing yards. With this loss, the Cowboys season ended. This also extended their streak of road playoff losses to eight consecutive games.
