= Rico Gathers =

American football player (born 1994)

No. 80
- Position: Tight end

Personal information
- Born: January 7, 1994 (age 32); New Orleans, Louisiana, U.S.
- Listed height: 6 ft 6 in (1.98 m)
- Listed weight: 285 lb (129 kg)

Career information
- High school: Riverside Academy (Reserve, Louisiana)
- College: Baylor
- NFL draft: 2016: 6th round, 217th overall pick

Career history
- Dallas Cowboys (2016–2018); Cleveland Browns (2019)

Awards and highlights
- First-team All-Big 12 (2015); Second-team All-Big 12 (2016); Big 12 All-Defensive Team (2015)

Career NFL statistics
- Receptions: 3
- Receiving yards: 45
- Stats at Pro Football Reference

Rickadon
- Born: Rico Gathers
- Genre: Hip hop
- Occupation: Rapper
- Years active: 2018–present

Ricardo Darnell Gathers (born January 7, 1994) is an American rapper and former professional football tight end. He was selected by the Dallas Cowboys in the sixth round of the 2016 NFL draft. He played college basketball at Baylor University and did not play college football.

== Early life ==
Gathers attended Riverside Academy. He was named Louisiana Mr. Basketball as a Junior while at Riverside Academy in Reserve, Louisiana. As a sophomore, he contributed to his team winning the state title, while averaging 19.8 points, 11.5 rebounds, 4.5 blocks and earning Most Outstanding Player honors at the state tournament.

As a junior, he averaged 20.7 points, 16.2 rebounds and 3.9 blocks per game. As a senior, he helped his team reach the Class 2A state championship game, while averaging 22 points, 17 rebounds, 4.1 blocks, 2.1 assists and 1.1 steals per game.

== College career ==
Gathers accepted a basketball scholarship from Baylor University. He became a starter at power forward as a junior, averaging 11.6 points (second on the team), 11.6 rebounds (led the team), 1.2 steals and one block and in 29.9 minutes per game. At the end of the season, he received All-Big 12 Conference, honorable-mention All-American and Big 12 All-Defensive Team honors. He led the conference in double-doubles with 17 and recorded a school record 28 rebounds in a win over Huston-Tillotson.

As a senior, he averaged 11.4 points and 9.1 rebounds per game. He finished as Baylor's All-Time leading rebounder. He also was the first player ever to reach over 1,000+ points and 1,000+ rebounds in school history.

== Professional career ==
=== Pre-draft ===
Pre-draft measurables
Height	Weight	Arm length	Hand span	40-yard dash	10-yard split	20-yard split	20-yard shuttle	Vertical jump	Broad jump	Bench press
6 ft 6 1/4 in (1.99 m)	273 lb (124 kg)	35 in (0.89 m)	11.2 in (0.28 m)	4.66 s	1.71 s	2.79 s	4.56 s	34.5 in (0.88 m)	9 ft 7 in (2.92 m)	16 reps
All values from Baylor pro day.

Although he had not played a down of football since middle school as a 13-year-old, Gathers informed Baylor head coach Art Briles that he would be joining the Bears football team for the 2016 season. However, he later decided to forgo playing for Baylor and entered the 2016 NFL draft after the Baylor men's basketball team lost in the first round of the 2016 NCAA Men's Division I Basketball Tournament to Yale.

=== Dallas Cowboys ===
Gathers was selected by the Dallas Cowboys in the sixth round (217th overall) of the 2016 NFL draft, based on the potential he showed during his pre-draft workout. In rookie minicamp the team considered playing Gathers at defensive end, but decided to keep him at tight end instead. On September 3, he was released and was re-signed to the practice squad the following day.

Gathers signed a reserve/future contract with Dallas on January 17, 2017. After a strong training camp and preseason, Gathers made the Cowboys' initial 53-man roster in 2017. However, he suffered a concussion in the preseason, and was placed on the injured reserve on September 4, which made him eligible to return in Week 8 at the earliest. Despite practicing with the squad since Week 9, after Week 13, Gathers was shut down for the season. It was later revealed that he also suffered jaw and neck injuries.

In 2018, the Cowboys made the unconventional move of keeping him as the fourth tight end to avoid losing him to waivers, even though he was arrested on the eve of roster cuts for marijuana possession. He was the fourth-string tight end behind Geoff Swaim, Blake Jarwin and rookie Dalton Schultz. In Week 5, he recorded his first professional catch against the Houston Texans. He finished the contest with three receptions for 45 yards.

On June 14, 2019, it was announced that Gathers would be suspended for the first game of the season, after violating the NFL's policy and program on substances of abuse. On August 5, Gathers was waived by the Cowboys.

=== Cleveland Browns ===
On August 11, 2019, he was signed as a free agent by the Cleveland Browns. He was placed on the reserve/suspended list on August 31. Gathers was waived by the Browns on September 10, after being reinstated from the suspension.

== Personal life ==
Gathers' father is the cousin of Hank Gathers, an All-American and former Loyola Marymount star. Gathers is married and has a child. During his time away from football, he self-taught himself to create, arrange and produce hip-hop music under the pseudonym Rickadon.

On August 31, 2018, he was arrested for possession of marijuana in Frisco, Texas.
