= Blake Jarwin =

American football player (born 1994)

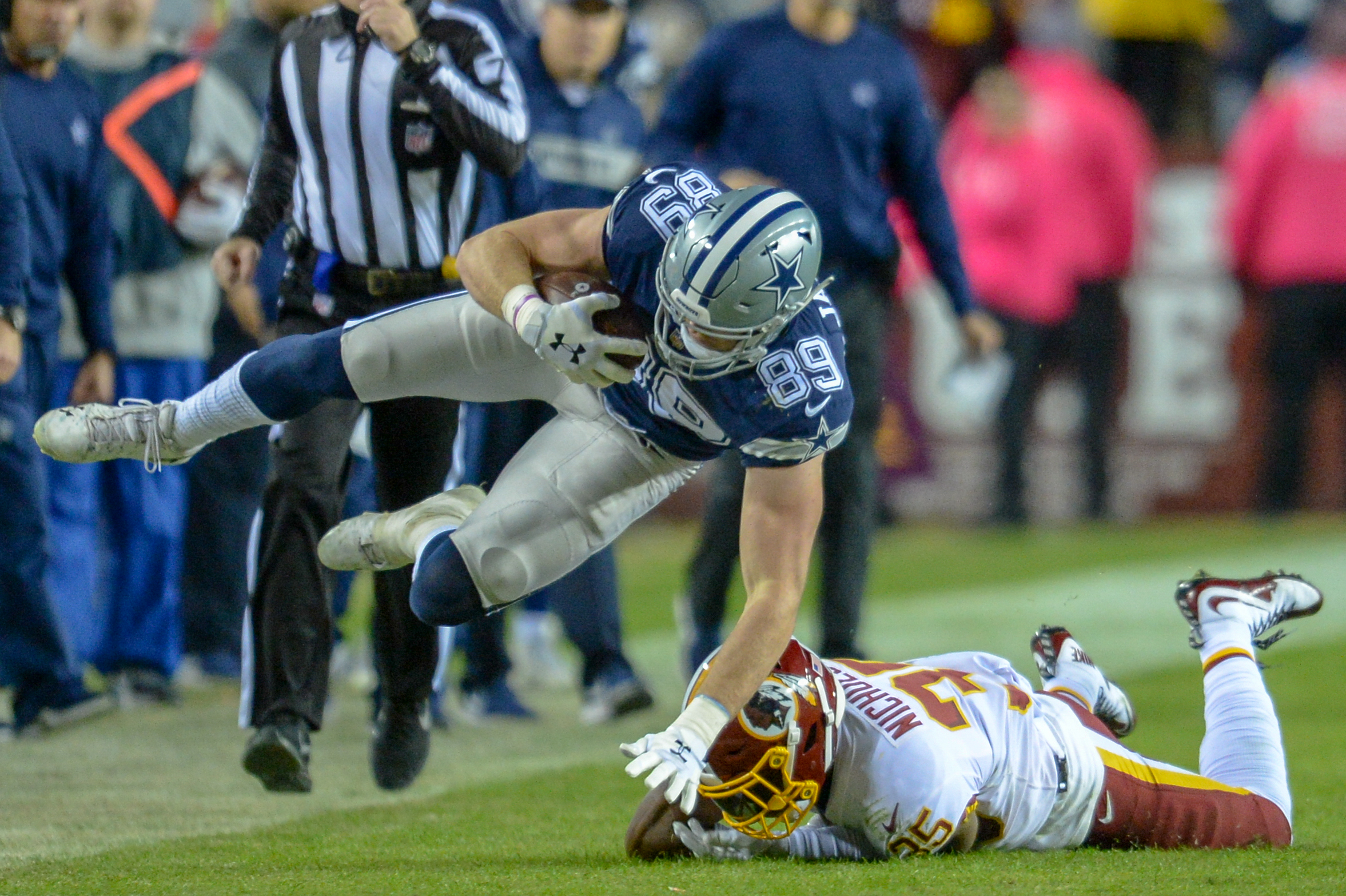
- Jarwin with the Dallas Cowboys in 2018

No. 89
- Position: Tight end

Personal information
- Born: July 16, 1994 (age 32); Oklahoma City, Oklahoma, U.S.
- Listed height: 6 ft 5 in (1.96 m)
- Listed weight: 250 lb (113 kg)

Career information
- High school: Tuttle (Tuttle, Oklahoma)
- College: Oklahoma State (2012–2016)
- NFL draft: 2017: undrafted

Career history
- Dallas Cowboys (2017–2021)

Awards and highlights
- First-team All-Big 12 (2015); Second-team All-Big 12 (2016)

Career NFL statistics
- Games played: 42
- Receptions: 70
- Receiving yards: 780
- Receiving touchdowns: 8
- Stats at Pro Football Reference

Blake Jarwin (born July 16, 1994) is an American former professional football player who was a tight end in the National Football League (NFL). He played college football for the Oklahoma State Cowboys and signed with the Dallas Cowboys as an undrafted free agent in 2017.

== Early life ==
Jarwin attended Tuttle High School in Tuttle, Oklahoma, where he played high school football. As a senior, Jarwin was named to the All-City team after posting seven receptions for 145 yards, 38 tackles (nine for loss) and three sacks. He also practiced baseball, basketball and track and field.

== College career ==
Jarwin walked on at Oklahoma State University, where he played mostly as a blocking tight end and on special teams. As a redshirt freshman, Jarwin practiced but did not appear in any game.

As a sophomore, Jarwin tallied five receptions for 107 yards, including a 47-yard touchdown against Texas Tech.

Jarwin became a starter as a junior, appearing in 11 games while missing two due to injury. He recorded 17 receptions for 200 yards and two touchdowns.

As a senior, Jarwin registered 19 receptions for 309 yards and two touchdowns.

Jarwin had career totals of 41 receptions for 616 yards and five touchdowns. He graduated with a degree in Management.

== Professional career ==
Pre-draft measurables
Height	Weight	Arm length	Hand span	40-yard dash	10-yard split	20-yard split	20-yard shuttle	Three-cone drill	Vertical jump	Broad jump	Bench press
6 ft 5 1/8 in (1.96 m)	246 lb (112 kg)	34 1/8 in (0.87 m)	9 7/8 in (0.25 m)	4.73 s	1.58 s	2.76 s	4.39 s	7.44 s	34.5 in (0.88 m)	10 ft 1 in (3.07 m)	21 reps
All values from Pro Day

=== 2017 season ===
After going undrafted in the 2017 NFL draft, Jarwin signed with the Dallas Cowboys as an undrafted free agent on May 12, 2017. He was waived on September 2, but was signed to the practice squad the next day.

On October 26, 2017, Jarwin was promoted to the active roster, in order to avoid the Philadelphia Eagles signing him. The move forced the Cowboys to keep four tight ends. Jarwin appeared in only one game in his rookie year and recorded no statistics.

=== 2018 season ===
With the unexpected retirements of starter Jason Witten and backup James Hanna, Jarwin had a chance to compete for the starting tight end position, but was named the backup behind Geoff Swaim.

After Swaim was lost to an injury in Week 11, rookie Dalton Schultz passed Jarwin on the depth chart as the starter and was used mostly for blocking purposes. During the regular-season finale against the New York Giants, Jarwin had the best game of his career, catching seven passes for 119 yards and three touchdowns in a narrow 36–35 road victory. Jarwin became the sixth tight end in franchise history to post a 100-yard receiving game and was named the NFC Offensive Player of the Week for his spectacular performance.

Jarwin was named the starter for four games when the Cowboys used multiple tight end sets, finishing his second professional season with 27 receptions for 307 yards and three touchdowns.

=== 2019 season ===
In 2019, although Swaim left via free agency, Witten returned to play professional football after spending the previous season as a Monday Night Football commentator. Jarwin was a backup at tight end behind Witten, posting 31 receptions for 365 yards and three touchdowns. Jarwin had a chance to start in seven contests, when the team opened the game in a two tight end formation.

=== 2020 season ===
On March 16, 2020, Jarwin signed a three-year, $24.25 million contract extension. The following day, it was announced in the media that Witten would be leaving the Cowboys to sign with the Las Vegas Raiders, making Jarwin the starter at tight end.

During the season opener against the Los Angeles Rams, Jarwin recorded a 12-yard reception in the first half before leaving the eventual 20–17 road loss with a knee injury. The next day, it was announced that he would be out for the season to undergo anterior cruciate ligament (ACL) surgery and was placed on injured reserve on September 15. He was replaced with Schultz in the starting lineup.

=== 2021 season ===
Jarwin returned as the backup to Schultz. He suffered a career-threatening hip injury in the seventh game against the Minnesota Vikings and was placed on injured reserve on November 6, 2021.

Jarwin was activated on January 8, 2022. He played in the regular-season finale against the Eagles and the Wild Card playoff loss to the San Francisco 49ers. Jarwin finished the 2021 season with 11 receptions for 96 yards and two touchdowns in eight games and five starts.

On March 11, 2022, Jarwin was released after not being able to recover his previous form.

== Career statistics ==
=== NFL ===
==== Regular season ====
Year	Team	Games		Receiving					Fumbles	
Year	Team	GP	GS	Rec	Yds	Avg	Lng	TD	Fum	Lost
2017	DAL	1	0	0	0	0.0	0	0	0	0
2018	DAL	16	4	27	307	11.4	39T	3	0	0
2019	DAL	16	7	31	365	11.8	42T	3	1	0
2020	DAL	1	1	1	12	12.0	12	0	0	0
2021	DAL	8	5	11	96	8.7	20	2	0	0
Career		42	17	70	780	11.1	42T	8	1	0

==== Postseason ====
Year	Team	Games		Receiving					Fumbles	
Year	Team	GP	GS	Rec	Yds	Avg	Lng	TD	Fum	Lost
2018	DAL	2	0	5	32	6.4	13	0	0	0
2021	DAL	1	0	0	0	0.0	0	0	0	0
Career		3	0	5	32	6.4	13	0	0	0

=== College ===
Season	Team	GP	Receiving			
Season	Team	GP	Rec	Yds	Avg	TD
2014	Oklahoma State	7	5	107	21.4	1
2015	Oklahoma State	9	17	200	11.8	2
2016	Oklahoma State	12	19	309	16.3	2
Total		28	41	616	15.0	5
