= Chris Covington =

American football player (born 1996)

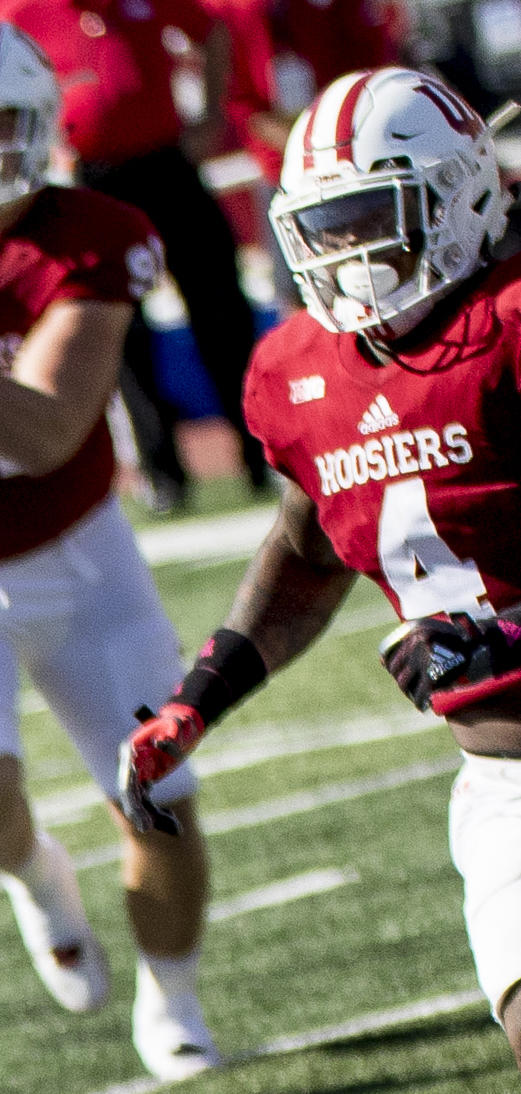
- Covington with the Indiana Hoosiers in 2017

No. 59
- Position: Linebacker

Personal information
- Born: January 3, 1996 (age 30); Chicago, Illinois, U.S.
- Listed height: 6 ft 2 in (1.88 m)
- Listed weight: 245 lb (111 kg)

Career information
- High school: Al Raby (Chicago, Illinois)
- College: Indiana
- NFL draft: 2018: 6th round, 193rd overall pick

Career history
- Dallas Cowboys (2018–2019); Indianapolis Colts (2020)*
- * Offseason or practice squad member only

Career NFL statistics
- Games played: 8
- Total tackles: 3
- Stats at Pro Football Reference

Chris Covington (born January 3, 1996) is an American former professional football player who was a linebacker in the National Football League (NFL) for the Dallas Cowboys. He played college football at Indiana.

== Early life ==
Covington attended Al Raby High School, where he played as a quarterback and defensive back. As a senior, he posted 1,993 passing yards, 26 passing touchdowns, 657 rushing yards, 13 rushing touchdowns, 6 tackles for loss, 3 interceptions, one forced fumble, while receiving All-city and All-conference honors.

He was considered a two-star recruit as an athlete.

== College career ==
Covington accepted a football scholarship from Indiana University to be a defensive player. As a freshman, he was tried at linebacker and defensive back. After Tre Roberson and Cam Coffman announced they would be transferring to other schools, Covington was moved to be the backup quarterback behind Nate Sudfeld. He appeared in four of the first five games and was used mostly in the Wildcat formation. In the sixth game against the University of Iowa, he saw extensive action after Sudfeld was injured with a separated left shoulder in the second quarter, registering 3 out of 12 completions for 31 yards, 11 carries for 41 yards, but suffered a season-ending torn ACL during the contest.

As a sophomore, he was moved to linebacker during spring practice. He appeared in the last 8 contests of the season and tallied 4 tackles (all against Penn State University).

As junior, he played in all 13 games (one start) backing up Marcus Oliver. He posted 29 tackles (19 solo), 2 sacks, one quarterback pressure, 3 tackles for loss, and one forced fumble. He earned his first career start in the eleventh game against the University of Michigan, making 6 tackles, one sack, and one forced fumble.

As a senior, he started all 12 games at middle linebacker, replacing the recently graduated Oliver. He registered 85 tackles (third on the team), 50 solo tackles (third on the team), 12 tackles for loss (second on the team), 3 sacks, 5 quarterback hurries (second on the team), 5 passes defensed (third on the team), and one fumble recovery. He was named the team's Defensive Player of the Year. He finished his college career with 118 tackles, 70 solo tackles, 5 sacks, and 15 tackles for loss.

== Professional career ==
Pre-draft measurables
Height	Weight	Arm length	Hand span	40-yard dash	10-yard split	20-yard split	20-yard shuttle	Three-cone drill	Vertical jump	Broad jump	Bench press
6 ft 2 1/4 in (1.89 m)	245 lb (111 kg)	32 1/2 in (0.83 m)	9 1/4 in (0.23 m)	4.78 s	1.63 s	2.76 s	4.39 s	7.02 s	33.5 in (0.85 m)	9 ft 8 in (2.95 m)	23 reps
All values from Pro Day except 40-yd dash and bench press

=== Dallas Cowboys ===
Covington was selected by the Dallas Cowboys in the sixth round (193rd overall) of the 2018 NFL draft. As a rookie, he was a backup linebacker and was declared inactive in 11 games. He appeared in five games, playing mostly on special teams and had one tackle.

On August 31, 2019, Covington was waived by the Cowboys and re-signed to the practice squad. He was promoted to the active roster on September 10, only to be waived four days later and re-signed back to the practice squad. He was promoted to the active roster on December 14. He appeared in 3 games as a reserve player, making 3 defensive tackles.

Covington was released by the Cowboys on April 30, 2020.

=== Indianapolis Colts ===
On December 15, 2020, Covington was signed to the Indianapolis Colts' practice squad. On December 29, he was released.

=== NFL career statistics ===
Year	Team	Games		Tackles				Interceptions						Fumbles	
Year	Team	GP	GS	Cmb	Solo	Ast	Sck	PD	Int	Yds	Avg	Lng	TD	FF	FR
2018	DAL	5	0	1	1	0	0.0	0	0	0	0.0	0	0	0	0
2019	DAL	3	0	2	2	0	0.0	0	0	0	0.0	0	0	0	0
Total		8	0	3	3	0	0.0	0	0	0	0.0	0	0	0	0
