= Rod Smith (running back) =

American football player (born 1992)

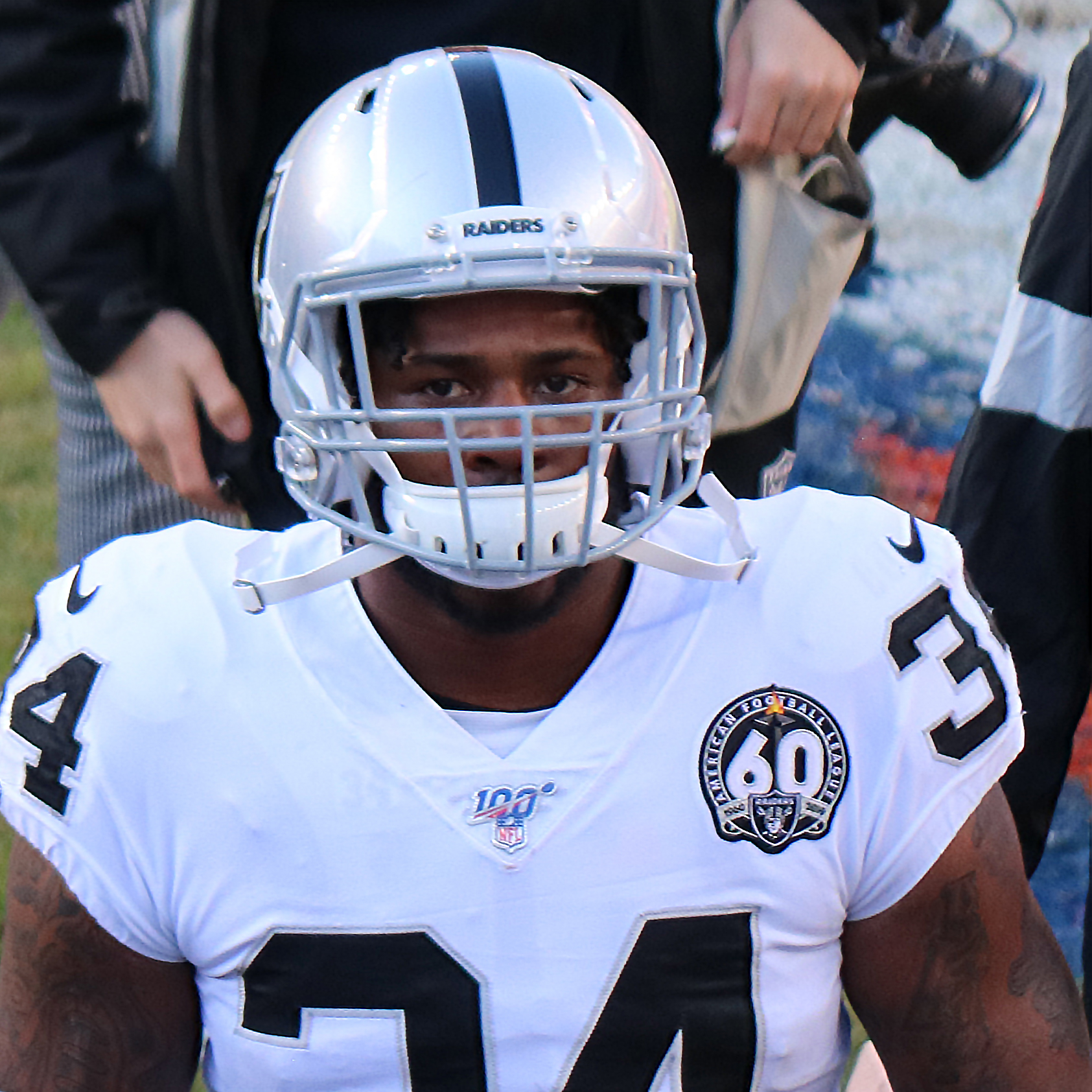
- Smith with the Oakland Raiders in 2019

No. 42, 45, 34
- Position: Running back

Personal information
- Born: January 10, 1992 (age 34); Fort Wayne, Indiana, U.S.
- Listed height: 6 ft 3 in (1.91 m)
- Listed weight: 236 lb (107 kg)

Career information
- High school: Paul Harding (Fort Wayne)
- College: Ohio State (2011–2014)
- NFL draft: 2015: undrafted

Career history
- Seattle Seahawks (2015); Dallas Cowboys (2015–2018); New York Giants (2019); Tennessee Titans (2019); Oakland Raiders (2019); New York Giants (2020)*; Carolina Panthers (2021)*; Vegas Vipers (2023)
- * Offseason or practice squad member only

Career NFL statistics
- Games played: 55
- Rushing yards: 364
- Rushing touchdowns: 5
- Receptions: 30
- Receiving yards: 272
- Receiving touchdowns: 1
- Return yards: 65
- Stats at Pro Football Reference

Rod Smith (born January 10, 1992) is an American former professional football player who was a running back in the National Football League (NFL). Smith played college football for the Ohio State Buckeyes and was signed by the Seattle Seahawks as an undrafted free agent in 2015. Smith was also a member of the Dallas Cowboys, New York Giants, Tennessee Titans, Oakland Raiders, Carolina Panthers, and Vegas Vipers.

== Early life ==
Smith attended Paul Harding High School, where he received All-state and player of the year honors as a senior. He graduated after rushing 1,000 times for a SAC conference career rushing record of 6,625 yards and 66 touchdowns.

As a senior, Smith also was an All-conference basketball player and was a part of the state's runner-up 4 × 100 metres relay team.

== College career ==
Smith accepted a football scholarship from Ohio State University as a highly rated recruit. As a redshirt freshman, he appeared in 10 games, opening the season against the University of Akron with 18 carries for 74 yards and a touchdown. The next week against the University of Toledo, Smith started to show a fumble problem, diminishing the coaching staff confidence in him. Smith's production was limited the rest of the season behind Dan Herron, Carlos Hyde and Jordan Hall. He registered 29 carries for 116 yards and a touchdown, while playing mainly on special teams. He was also suspended after missing the team flight to the 2012 Gator Bowl.

As a sophomore, Smith was a backup behind Hyde and Jordan, appearing in 12 games with 32 carries for 215 yards and two touchdowns. He led the team in kickoff returns (13), total return yards (303) and return average (23.3). Smith's best game came against Penn State University, tallying four carries for 48 yards.

As a junior, Smith was suspended for an undisclosed offseason incident for the season opener against the University at Buffalo. He fell back in the running back rotation behind Hyde, Jordan, Dontre Wilson, and Ezekiel Elliott. Smith recorded 22 carries for 117 yards (5.3-yard average) and a touchdown.

As a senior, Smith missed most of spring camp for academic reasons. He still emerged as the team's goal line running back behind sophomore starter Elliott, posting 24 carries for 101 yards and four touchdowns, while also contributing on special teams. On October 27, Smith was dismissed from the football team after a failed drug test and decided to declare for the NFL draft. Smith finished his college career with 107 carries for 549 yards and 10 touchdowns.

== Professional career ==
Pre-draft measurables
| Height | Weight |
|---|---|
| 6 ft 2 5/8 in (1.90 m) | 231 lb (105 kg) |
All values from Pro Day

=== Seattle Seahawks ===
Smith was signed as an undrafted free agent by the Seattle Seahawks after the 2015 NFL draft on May 2. He was waived on September 5 and signed to the practice squad the next day.

On October 10, Smith was promoted to the active roster to provide depth while running backs Marshawn Lynch and Fred Jackson recovered from injuries. He played in one game against the Cincinnati Bengals, rushing for five yards on two carries. Smith was released on October 13.

=== Dallas Cowboys ===
==== 2015 season ====
On October 14, 2015, Smith was claimed off waivers by the Dallas Cowboys. He became the third-string running back after Joseph Randle was released on November 3. Smith appeared in 10 games, playing mainly on special teams and having one kickoff return for 26 yards.

==== 2016 season ====
In 2016, Smith was moved to fullback during OTAs, although he did not have the traditional size and body. He competed with converted linebacker Keith Smith for the position and both made the team, although Rod was used only for special teams purposes. On November 3, after injuries to Morris Claiborne and Barry Church, the Cowboys were forced to release him to make room for cornerback Leon McFadden. Smith was re-signed to the practice squad two days later. At the time, he was tied for second on the team with four special teams tackles.

==== 2017 season ====
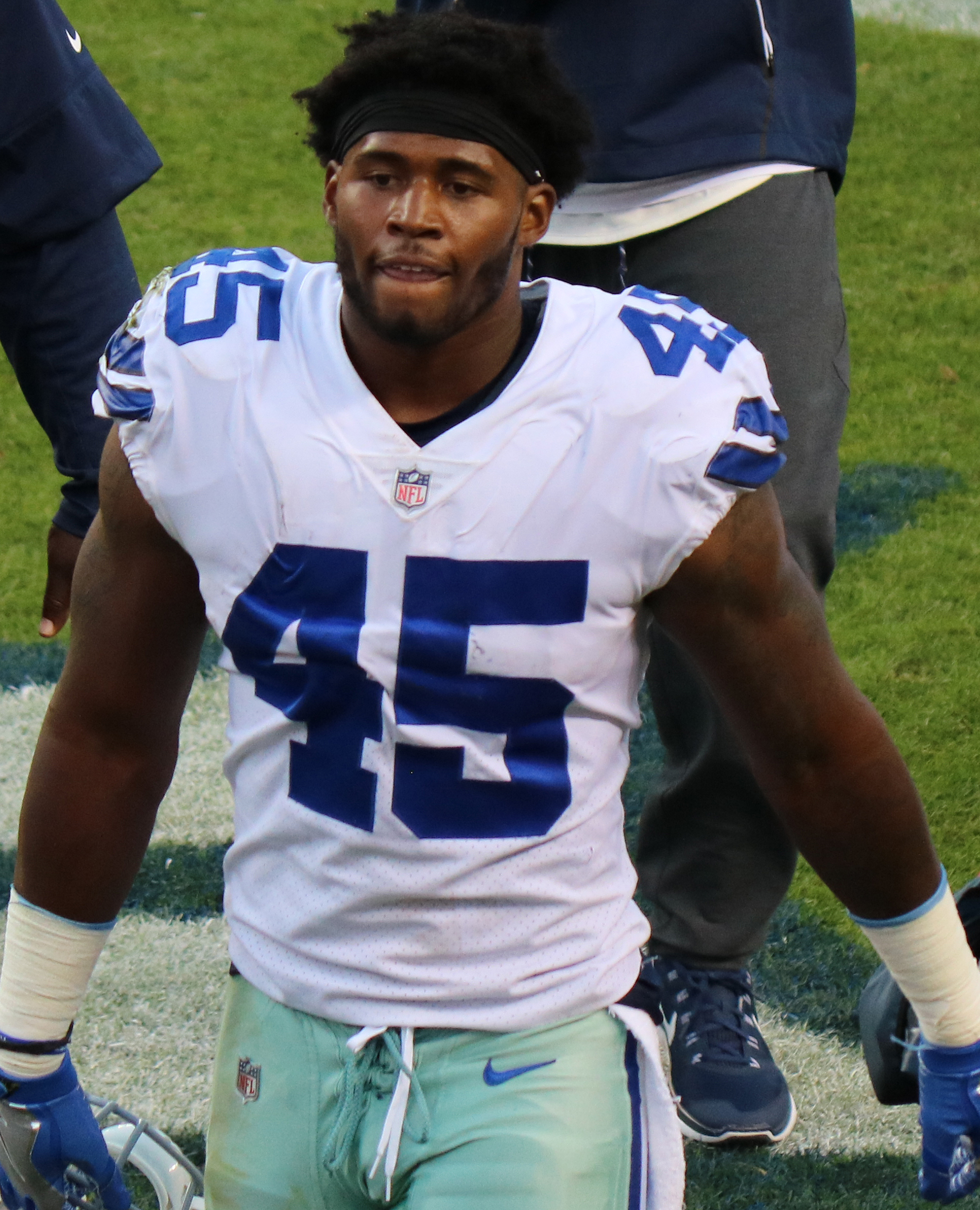
Smith in 2017

Smith signed a reserve/future contract with the Cowboys on January 16, 2017. In 2017, he returned to running back behind Ezekiel Elliott, Alfred Morris, and Darren McFadden. During the preseason, he was moved up to third-string because of his improved play and production on special teams. During Week 2 against the Denver Broncos, Smith had his first two carries with the Cowboys, which went for eight yards in the 42–17 road loss.

When Elliott was suspended for six games for violating the league's personal conduct policy, Smith ended up earning more playing time behind Alfred Morris. On Thanksgiving Day against the Los Angeles Chargers, Smith scored his first professional touchdown on a two-yard rush. He finished the game with 41 rushing yards, a rushing touchdown, and seven receiving yards. During Week 13 against the Washington Redskins, Smith ran for 27 yards and a touchdown as the Cowboys won by a score of 38–14. In the next game against the New York Giants, Smith had 47 rushing yards and a touchdown along with 113 receiving yards, including an 81-yard touchdown reception, helping secure a 30–10 victory. The following week against the Oakland Raiders, Smith rushed for 13 yards and a touchdown as the Cowboys narrowly won by a score of 20–17.

When Elliott returned from his suspension in Week 16 against the Seattle Seahawks, Smith's productivity dropped, only rushing for 10 yards in that game. He was declared inactive for the last game against the Philadelphia Eagles, after battling an illness and a sore back. Smith finished the season with 55 carries for 232 yards, 4 rushing touchdowns, 19 receptions, 202 receiving yards, one receiving touchdown and 5 special teams tackles (tied for fifth on the team).

==== 2018 season ====
Smith wasn't a factor on offense as the backup running back, but maintained his role as a core special teams player. His most action on offense came in the season finale against the New York Giants, registering 12 carries for 35 yards and one touchdown, when starter Ezekiel Elliott sat out to rest for the playoffs. His numbers decreased from the previous season to 44 carries for 127 yards and one touchdown. He was second on the team with 10 special teams tackles.

=== New York Giants (first stint) ===
On May 8, 2019, Smith signed with the New York Giants. He was placed on injured reserve with an adductor injury on August 31. Smith was released from injured reserve with an injury settlement 10 days later.

=== Tennessee Titans ===
On October 8, 2019, Smith signed with the Tennessee Titans. He appeared in three games and was declared inactive in two contests, playing only on special teams and had one tackle. Smith was released on November 12.

=== Oakland Raiders ===
On December 10, 2019, Smith was signed by the Oakland Raiders, reuniting with special teams coordinator Rich Bisaccia, who served in the same role with the Cowboys. Smith appeared in three games, playing on special teams. He had three solo tackles.

On March 25, 2020, Smith was re-signed to a one-year contract. He was placed on the reserve/COVID-19 list by the team on August 6. Smith was activated from the list on August 18, but was released on September 1.

=== New York Giants (second stint) ===
On September 8, 2020, Smith was signed to the New York Giants practice squad, reuniting with offensive coordinator Jason Garrett, who was his head coach with the Cowboys. On September 29, Smith was released from the Giants practice squad, to make room for another former Cowboys running back (Alfred Morris).

=== Carolina Panthers ===
On August 5, 2021, Smith was signed by the Carolina Panthers. He was released on August 17.

=== Vegas Vipers ===
Smith was selected by the Vegas Vipers in the 9th round of the Phase 6 of the 2023 XFL draft. He reunited with head coach Rod Woodson, after Smith grew up attending Woodson's annual summer camps as a youth. He appeared in nine games, posting 70 carries for 274 yards (led the team) and two touchdowns to go along with 13 receptions for 116 yards and a touchdown. The Vipers folded when the XFL and USFL merged to create the United Football League (UFL).

== NFL career statistics ==
=== Regular season ===
| Year | Team | Games | | Rushing | | | | | Receiving | | | | | Fumbles | |
| Year | Team | GP | GS | Att | Yds | Avg | Lng | TD | Rec | Yds | Avg | Lng | TD | Fum | Lost |
|---|---|---|---|---|---|---|---|---|---|---|---|---|---|---|---|
| 2015 | SEA | 1 | 0 | 2 | 5 | 2.5 | 3 | 0 | 0 | 0 | 0.0 | 0 | 0 | 0 | 0 |
| 2015 | DAL | 10 | 0 | 0 | 0 | 0.0 | 0 | 0 | 1 | 6 | 6.0 | 6 | 0 | 0 | 0 |
| 2016 | DAL | 7 | 0 | 0 | 0 | 0.0 | 0 | 0 | 1 | 4 | 4.0 | 4 | 0 | 0 | 0 |
| 2017 | DAL | 15 | 1 | 55 | 232 | 4.2 | 45 | 4 | 19 | 202 | 10.6 | 81T | 1 | 0 | 0 |
| 2018 | DAL | 16 | 1 | 44 | 127 | 2.9 | 14 | 1 | 9 | 60 | 6.7 | 14 | 0 | 0 | 0 |
| Career | | 49 | 2 | 101 | 364 | 3.6 | 45 | 5 | 30 | 272 | 9.1 | 81T | 1 | 0 | 0 |

=== Postseason ===
| Year | Team | Games | | Rushing | | | | | Receiving | | | | | Fumbles | |
| Year | Team | GP | GS | Att | Yds | Avg | Lng | TD | Rec | Yds | Avg | Lng | TD | Fum | Lost |
|---|---|---|---|---|---|---|---|---|---|---|---|---|---|---|---|
| 2018 | DAL | 1 | 0 | 1 | 1 | 1.0 | 1 | 0 | 0 | 0 | 0.0 | 0 | 0 | 0 | 0 |
| Career | | 1 | 0 | 1 | 1 | 1.0 | 1 | 0 | 0 | 0 | 0.0 | 0 | 0 | 0 | 0 |

== Personal life ==
Smith's younger brother, Jaylon, is a Pro Bowl linebacker in the NFL and was a consensus All-American in college.
