= Donovan Olumba =

American gridiron football player (born 1995)

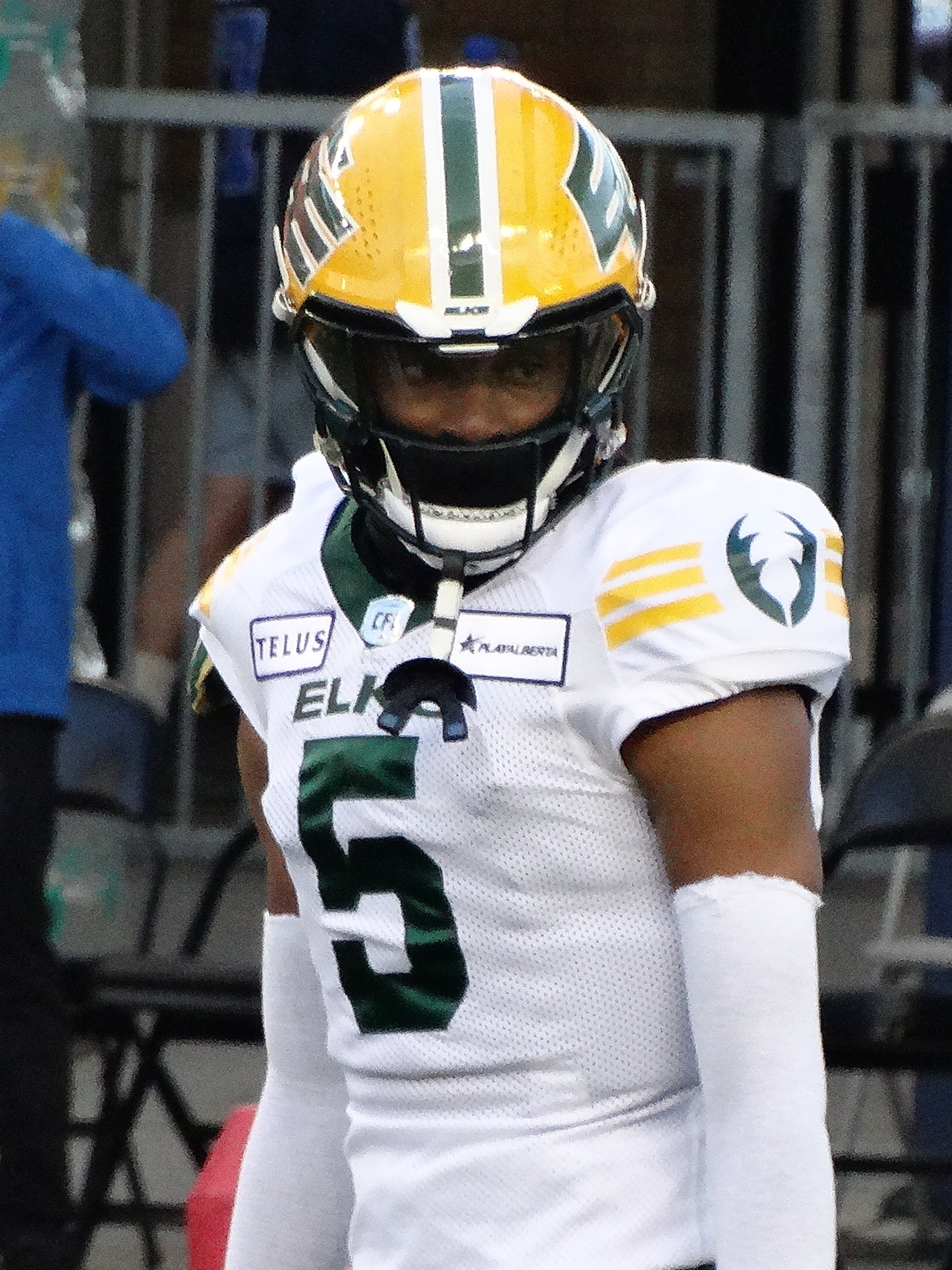
- Olumba with the Edmonton Elks in 2023

Profile
- Position: Defensive back

Personal information
- Born: September 26, 1995 (age 31); Tucson, Arizona, U.S.
- Listed height: 6 ft 2 in (1.88 m)
- Listed weight: 205 lb (93 kg)

Career information
- High school: Salpointe (Tucson, Arizona)
- College: Portland State
- NFL draft: 2018: undrafted

Career history
- Dallas Cowboys (2018–2019); Cleveland Browns (2020)*; Hamilton Tiger-Cats (2021)*; Los Angeles Rams (2021)*; Winnipeg Blue Bombers (2021)*; Edmonton Elks (2022–2023)
- * Offseason or practice squad member only
- Stats at Pro Football Reference

Donovan Olumba (born September 26, 1995) is an American professional football defensive back. He played college football at Portland State University.

== Early life ==
Olumba attended Salpointe Catholic High School, where he played only one season of Varsity Football as a wide receiver and cornerback. He accepted a football scholarship from Division II Alderson-Broaddus University.

He played 3 seasons as a cornerback, competing in 30 games, while posting 63 tackles, 25 pass deflections, 2 fumble recoveries, 2 blocked kicks and 6 interceptions, including 2 returns for touchdowns (47 and 99 yards). He also had 13 punt returns for 143 yards and one touchdown.

In 2016, he transferred to Division I Portland State University after his junior season, where he was redshirted.

He played only one year in 2017 and was named a starter at cornerback, after being third-string on the depth chart. He registered 21 tackles and 7 pass deflections.

== Professional career ==
=== Dallas Cowboys ===
Olumba was signed by the Dallas Cowboys as an undrafted free agent after the 2018 NFL draft on April 29, after the hiring of Kris Richard as the new defensive backs/passing game coordinator, when the Cowboys changed their defensive philosophy and started to look for taller and more rangy cornerbacks. He was waived on September 1 and signed to the practice squad the next day.

He signed a reserve/future contract with the Cowboys on January 15, 2019. He was released on August 31. He was signed to the practice squad on September 2. He was promoted to the active roster on December 28. He appeared in the season finale against the Washington Redskins as a backup. He was released on March 18, 2020.

=== Cleveland Browns ===
Olumba signed with the Cleveland Browns on March 21, 2020. Olumba was waived by the Browns on September 5, 2020. Olumba signed to the Browns' practice squad on January 12, 2021. His practice squad contract with the team expired after the season on January 25, 2021.

=== Hamilton Tiger-Cats ===
Olumba signed with the Hamilton Tiger-Cats of the Canadian Football League (CFL) on June 10, 2021. He was released on July 26, 2021.

=== Los Angeles Rams ===
On August 6, 2021, Olumba signed with the Los Angeles Rams. He was waived on August 30, 2021.

=== Winnipeg Blue Bombers ===
On October 3, 2021, he was added to the roster of the Winnipeg Blue Bombers of the CFL. On October 12, 2021, he was released from the practice roster. On January 26, 2022, he was added to the roster. On May 19, 2022, he was released.

=== Edmonton Elks ===
On September 1, 2022, he signed with the CFL's Edmonton Elks. He appeared in 2 games and had one interception. On May 10, 2023, he was placed on the retired list. However, Olumba later came out of retirement and dressed in three games, all starts, for the Elks during the 2023 season. He was released on May 15, 2024.
