= Dustin Stanton =

American football player (born 1994)

No. 67
- Position: Offensive lineman

Personal information
- Born: February 20, 1994 (age 32); Lakewood, Washington, U.S.
- Listed height: 6 ft 6 in (1.98 m)
- Listed weight: 315 lb (143 kg)

Career information
- High school: Lakewood (Arlington, Washington)
- College: Oregon State

Career history
- Cincinnati Bengals (2017)*; Dallas Cowboys (2018)
- * Offseason or practice squad member only
- Stats at Pro Football Reference

Dustin Stanton (born February 20, 1994) is an American former football offensive lineman. He played college football at Oregon State.

== Early life ==
Dustin Stanton was born in North Lakewood, Washington to Marty and Diana Stanton on February 20, 1994. His father played football at Eastern Washington University and worked as a physical therapist where he founded North Sound Physical Therapy in Marysville, Washington.

Stanton attended Lakewood High School in North Lakewood, Washington. As a three-year captain, Stanton was a two-time recipient of Lakewood's Coaches Award for leadership and hustle. He also earned first-team all-league as a senior on the hardwood; honorable mention as a junior.

Stanton played on offense and defense as a linebacker and tight end, and also participated in basketball and track and field while in high school.

Stanton was No.10 overall in Washington with 21 receptions and four touchdowns his senior season. He was considered a three-star recruit by Rivals.com and was rated as the 32nd tight end prospect of his class.

== College career ==
Stanton accepted a football scholarship from Oregon State University. As a redshirt freshman, he started 13 games at tight end, but then moved to the offensive line.

As a sophomore, he started 6 games at right tackle.

As a junior, he continued to play at right tackle and started 12 games. Stanton was one of only two offensive linemen to start all 12 games in 2015.

As a senior at Oregon State, Stanton started all 12 games, three at right tackle and nine at right guard.

== Professional career ==
Pre-draft measurables
Height	Weight	40-yard dash	20-yard shuttle	Three-cone drill	Vertical jump	Broad jump	Bench press
6 ft 6 in (1.98 m)	298 lb (135 kg)	5.16 s	4.62 s	7.78 s	30 in (0.76 m)	9 ft 1 in (2.77 m)	18 reps

=== Cincinnati Bengals ===
Stanton signed with the Cincinnati Bengals on April 29, 2017, as an undrafted free agent. He was released in August out of preseason.

=== Dallas Cowboys ===
Stanton signed a 2-year contract with the Dallas Cowboys on April 28, 2018, as a free agent. He suffered a knee injury and was placed on injured reserve for the remainder of the season.
