= Kyle Queiro =

American football player (born 1994)

No. 41, 52
- Position: Linebacker

Personal information
- Born: December 18, 1994 (age 31); Verona, New Jersey
- Listed height: 6 ft 3 in (1.91 m)
- Listed weight: 230 lb (104 kg)

Career information
- High school: Bergen Catholic (NJ)
- College: Northwestern
- NFL draft: 2018: undrafted

Career history
- Dallas Cowboys (2018–2019)*; Seattle Dragons (2020)
- * Offseason or practice squad member only

Awards and highlights
- Third-team All-Big Ten (2017)
- Stats at Pro Football Reference

Kyle Christian Queiro (born December 18, 1994) is an American former football linebacker. He played college football at Northwestern University and professionally for the Dallas Cowboys and the Seattle Dragons.

== Early life ==
Queiro attended Bergen Catholic High School, where he practiced football, track and basketball. In football, he was a two-way player at defensive back and wide receiver. He was a teammate of future NFL player Garrett Dickerson. He helped the team play in the state championship game in 3 straight years. He received All-state and All-metro honors as a senior.

He competed in the triple jump and high jump, receiving All-county honors as a senior.

== College career ==
Queiro accepted a football scholarship from Northwestern University. As a redshirt freshman, he started in the season finale against the University of Illinois, collecting 5 tackles.

As a sophomore, he appeared in 5 games as a reserve player. He was forced to miss 8 contests after fracturing his arm against Ball State University. He had a key fourth quarter interception against Stanford University, helping the team preserve a 16–6 upset win.

As a junior, he started 10 games at strong safety, registering 53 tackles (32 solo), 3.5 tackles for loss, 2 interceptions and 6 pass breakups (tied for sixth on the team). He had a highlight one-handed interception against Indiana University. He made 8 tackles against Ohio State University. He had 9 tackles and 2.5 tackles for loss against the University of Minnesota. He helped secure a 31–24 win against the University of Pittsburgh in the 2016 Pinstripe Bowl, after intercepting a pass with less than 2 minutes left in the game.

As a senior, he started 13 games at strong safety, posting 60 tackles, 5.5 tackles for loss, 5 interceptions (led the team) and 9 pass breakups (led the team). He had 9 tackles against Duke University. He made 6 tackles, 2 interceptions and 3 pass breakups against Nebraska. He had a critical interception against the University of Kentucky, in the fourth quarter of the 2017 Music City Bowl, to help the team win 24–23.

He finished his college career with 132 tackles, 9 tackles for loss, and 8 interceptions (tied for tenth in school history).

== Professional career ==
=== Dallas Cowboys ===
Queiro was signed by the Dallas Cowboys as an undrafted free agent after the 2018 NFL draft on April 29. He dropped in the draft because his 40-yard dash time was considered slow compared to other defensive backs, so he was also tried at outside linebacker during training camp. He was waived on September 1 and signed to the practice squad the next day. He signed a reserve/future contract with the Cowboys on January 14, 2019. He was released on August 31, 2019.

=== Seattle Dragons (XFL) ===
In October 2019, Queiro was selected by the Seattle Dragons during the open phase (phase 5) of the 2020 XFL draft. On March 9, 2020, he was placed on injured reserve. In March, amid the COVID-19 pandemic, the league announced that it would be cancelling the rest of the season. Playing in all 5 games, he registered 11 tackles and one interception. He had his contract terminated when the league suspended operations on April 10, 2020.

== Personal life ==
On July 10, 2020, Quiero attracted a large amount of backlash, particularly from Black musicians, such as K. Michelle and Tory Lanez, and music fans, when he made derogatory tweets about the looks of neo soul singer Jill Scott. Quiero publicly apologized to Scott on July 11, stating that "First and foremost, I would like to apologize to Miss Jill Scott. The topic of your beauty should not have been shared over social media for public discourse. There’s truly no excuses or explanations to be made. My comments were distasteful and unbecoming of a Black man to speak negatively of a Black woman under any circumstance."
