= Marcus Martin (American football) =

American football player (born 1993)

No. 66, 60, 68
- Position: Guard

Personal information
- Born: November 29, 1993 (age 32); Los Angeles, California, U.S.
- Listed height: 6 ft 3 in (1.91 m)
- Listed weight: 330 lb (150 kg)

Career information
- High school: Crenshaw (Los Angeles)
- College: USC (2011–2013)
- NFL draft: 2014: 3rd round, 70th overall pick

Career history
- San Francisco 49ers (2014–2016); Cleveland Browns (2017); Dallas Cowboys (2018); Seattle Seahawks (2019)*; Detroit Lions (2020); New England Patriots (2020); New England Patriots (2021)
- * Offseason or practice squad member only

Awards and highlights
- First-team Freshman All-American (2011); First-team All-Pac-12 (2013)

Career NFL statistics
- Games played: 29
- Games started: 24
- Stats at Pro Football Reference

Marcus Martin (born November 29, 1993) is an American former professional football player who was a guard in the National Football League (NFL). He was selected by the San Francisco 49ers in the third round of the 2014 NFL draft. He played college football for the USC Trojans.

== Early life ==
Martin attended Crenshaw High School in Los Angeles, California. As a senior, he helped the team win the 2010 L.A. City Division I championship. He received All-L.A. City,All-State Division 1 first-team, Offense Defense Bowl All-American, Offensive Lineman of the Year and Los Angeles Times All-Star honors.

He was considered a three-star recruit by Rivals.com and was rated as the 28th best offensive guard prospect of his class.

== College career ==
Martin accepted a football scholarship from the University of Southern California. As a true freshman, he started 10 games and earned freshman all-American honors at left guard.

As a sophomore, he started 10 games at left guard. As a junior, he was voted a team captain and moved to center starting 13 games earning 1st team All-Pac-12 Conference. He suffered knee and ankle injuries in the season finale against UCLA and did not play in the 2013 Las Vegas Bowl.

He declared for the NFL draft after his junior season. During his college career he had 20 starts at center and 13 at left guard.

== Professional career ==
Pre-draft measurables
Height	Weight	Arm length	Hand span	Bench press
6 ft 3 1/4 in (1.91 m)	320 lb (145 kg)	34 in (0.86 m)	10 in (0.25 m)	23 reps
All values from NFL Combine

=== San Francisco 49ers ===
Martin was selected by the San Francisco 49ers in the third round (70th overall) of the 2014 NFL draft. He was the second center to be selected and one of three USC Trojans to be selected that year. As a rookie, he suffered a dislocated kneecap in the third preseason game against the San Diego Chargers and was forced to miss the first two months of the regular season. He started the last 8 games at center, after replacing Daniel Kilgore who broke his leg in the seventh game against the Denver Broncos.

In 2015, he was named the starter at center over Kilgore. He had 14 starts, with 13 coming at center and one and at right guard.

In 2016, he was passed on the depth chart by Kilgore. He appeared in four games, starting 2 at left guard, before being placed on the injured reserve list with an ankle injury on December 31. He was waived on March 8, 2017.

=== Cleveland Browns ===
On March 9, 2017, Martin was claimed off waivers by the Cleveland Browns. He did not play any snaps during the season as a backup behind Austin Reiter.

=== Dallas Cowboys ===
On March 26, 2018, Martin signed as a free agent with the Dallas Cowboys. He came into training camp out of shape and struggled. He suffered a torn ligament in the right big toe during the preseason opener against the 49ers and was placed on injured reserve on August 13.

=== Seattle Seahawks ===
On May 9, 2019, Martin signed with the Seattle Seahawks. He was released on August 31, 2019.

=== Detroit Lions ===
On September 23, 2020, Martin was signed to the practice squad of the Detroit Lions. He was elevated to the active roster on November 7 and December 19 for the team's weeks 9 and 15 games against the Minnesota Vikings and Tennessee Titans, and reverted to the practice squad after each game. He was released on December 22, 2020.

=== New England Patriots ===
On December 28, 2020, Martin was signed to the New England Patriots active roster. He was placed on injured reserve on August 24, 2021. He was released on September 2, 2021, with an injury settlement.
