= Geoff Swaim =

American football player (born 1993)

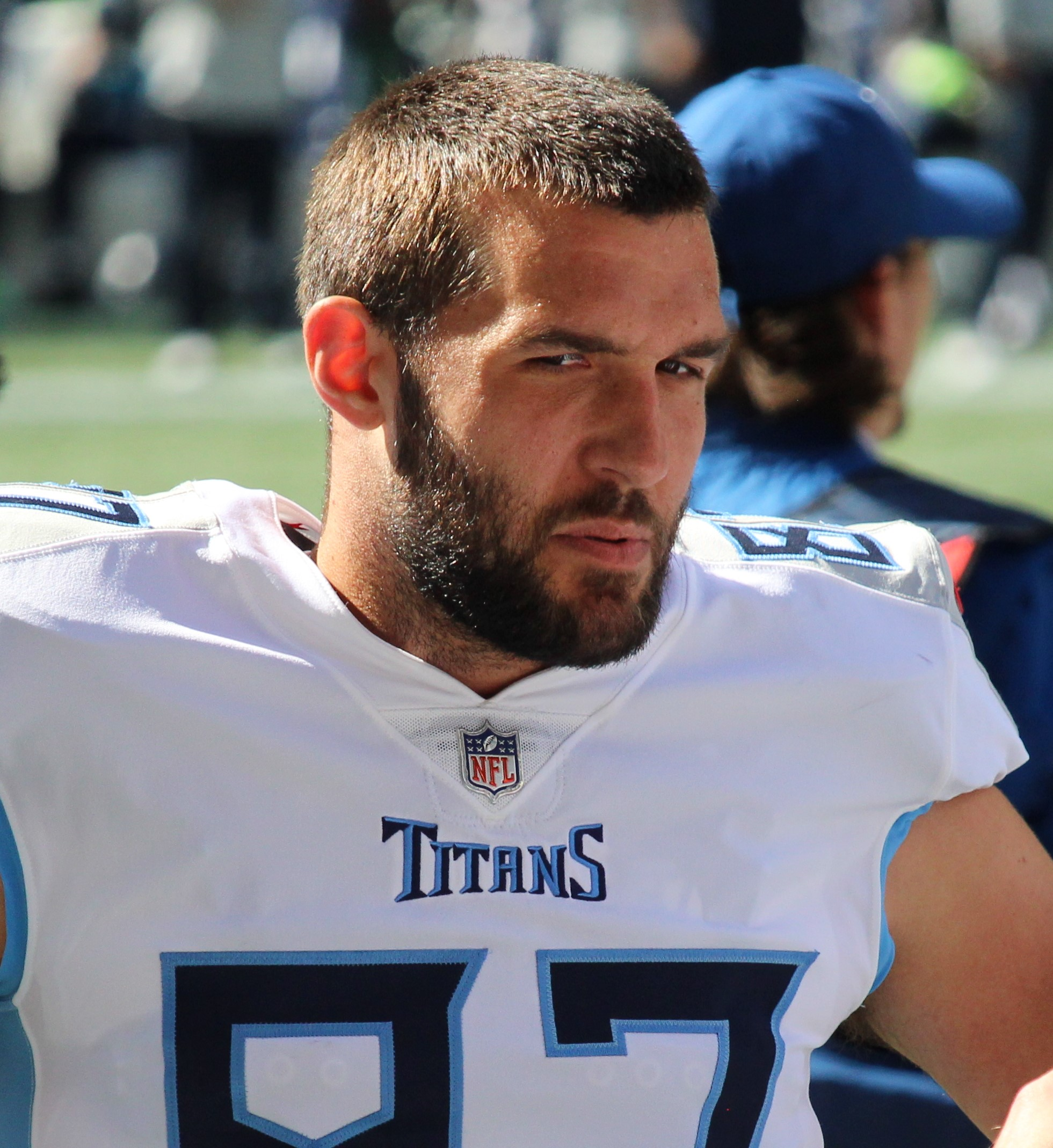
- Swaim with the Tennessee Titans in 2021

No. 87, 84
- Position: Tight end

Personal information
- Born: September 16, 1993 (age 33); Chico, California, U.S.
- Listed height: 6 ft 4 in (1.93 m)
- Listed weight: 260 lb (118 kg)

Career information
- High school: Pleasant Valley (Chico)
- College: Butte (2011–2012); Texas (2013–2014)
- NFL draft: 2015: 7th round, 246th overall pick

Career history
- Dallas Cowboys (2015–2018); Jacksonville Jaguars (2019); Tennessee Titans (2020–2022); Arizona Cardinals (2023); Cleveland Browns (2024)

Career NFL statistics
- Receptions: 111
- Receiving yards: 853
- Receiving touchdowns: 6
- Stats at Pro Football Reference

Geoff Swaim (born September 16, 1993) is an American former football tight end in the National Football League (NFL). He played college football for the Texas Longhorns and was selected in the seventh round of the 2015 NFL draft by the Dallas Cowboys. Swaim also played for the Jacksonville Jaguars, Tennessee Titans, Arizona Cardinals, and Cleveland Browns.

== Early life ==
Swaim attended Pleasant Valley High School, where he played high school football. Swaim played linebacker and received All-section and All-league honors as a senior, after registering 124 tackles (65 solo), six sacks, an interception, a fumble recovery, and two blocked extra points. He also participated in basketball.

== College career ==
Swaim enrolled at Butte College, where he was converted to tight end and was a two-year starter, helping the team win back-to-back bowls and the 2012 Nor Cal Conference Championship.

After his sophomore season, Swaim transferred to the University of Texas where he was a two-year starter, being used mostly as a blocking tight end and on special teams. Swaim finished with 22 starts out of 26 games, recording 13 receptions for 84 yards and a touchdown.

== Professional career ==
Pre-draft measurables
Height	Weight	Arm length	Hand span	40-yard dash	10-yard split	20-yard split	20-yard shuttle	Three-cone drill	Vertical jump	Broad jump
6 ft 4 3/8 in (1.94 m)	252 lb (114 kg)	33 5/8 in (0.85 m)	9 1/4 in (0.23 m)	4.71 s	1.66 s	2.73 s	4.58 s	7.28 s	35.5 in (0.90 m)	10 ft 4 in (3.15 m)
All values from Texas' Pro Day

=== Dallas Cowboys ===
==== 2015 season ====
Swaim was selected by the Dallas Cowboys in the seventh round (246th overall) in the 2015 NFL draft. The Cowboys traded their sixth-round pick (178th overall) in the 2016 NFL draft to the San Francisco 49ers in exchange for a seventh-round pick after it became apparent Swaim was considering signing with the San Diego Chargers if he had become an undrafted free agent. Swaim was the 17th tight end drafted in 2015.

Swaim played well enough in the preseason to force the team to make the unusual of move of keeping four tight ends. As a rookie, he was declared inactive for 12 games, while playing in four games. Swaim had one start against the New England Patriots, when he replaced an injured James Hanna and the Cowboys opened in a three-tight end set. The season-ending injury to Gavin Escobar gave Swaim a chance to play in the last two games and record one reception for no yards.

==== 2016 season ====
Swaim became the backup and blocking tight end after James Hanna missed the season with a knee bone bruise. Swaim started the season opener against the New York Giants as the second tight end. He started in the ninth game against the Pittsburgh Steelers as the second tight end but suffered a pectoral injury and was replaced by Gavin Escobar. On November 16, Swaim was placed on injured reserve.

Swaim finished his second professional season with six receptions for 69 yards in nine games and six starts.

==== 2017 season ====
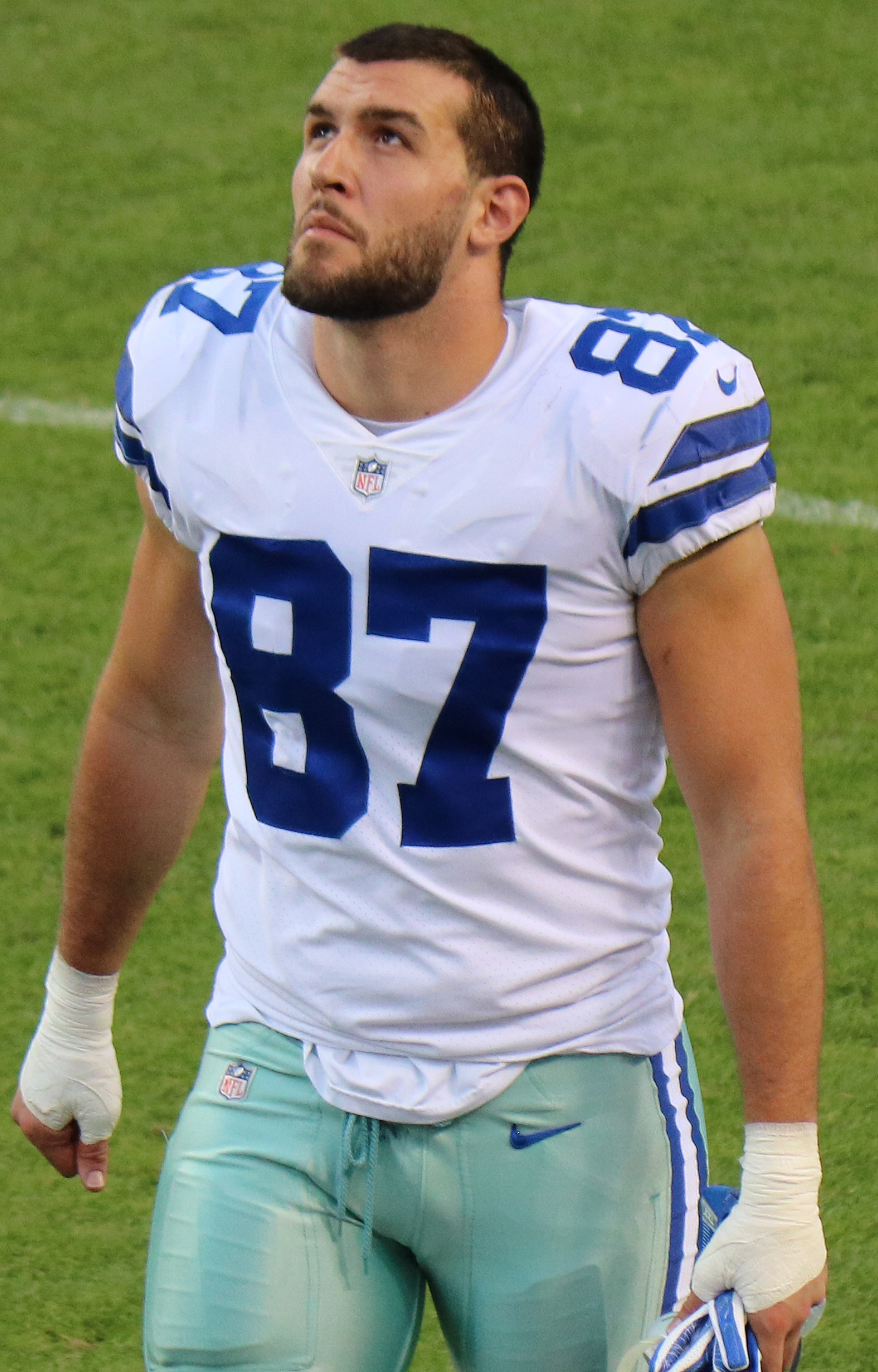
Swaim in 2017

Swaim missed part of the offseason due to a foot fracture he suffered during a personal workout. Swaim was the third-string tight end behind James Hanna. Swaim was declared inactive against the Atlanta Falcons due to a knee injury he suffered in practice.

Swaim finished the 2017 season with two receptions for 25 yards in 15 games and two starts.

==== 2018 season ====
Swaim entered the season as the Cowboys starting tight end after the sudden retirements of Jason Witten and James Hanna.

During Week 3 against the Seattle Seahawks, Swaim had a career-high five receptions for a then career-high 47 yards in the 24–13 road loss. In the next game against the Detroit Lions, he scored his first NFL touchdown on a one-yard reception from Dak Prescott and finished the narrow 26–24 victory with five receptions for 39 yards and the aforementioned touchdown. The following week against the Houston Texans, Swaim recorded three receptions for a career-high 55 yards during the 19–16 overtime road loss.

During a Week 11 22–19 road loss to the Falcons, Swaim had four receptions for 24 yards before suffering a broken bone in his wrist. Swaim missed the next four games before being placed on injured reserve on December 22.

Swaim was used mostly for his blocking, finishing the 2018 season with a then career-high 26 receptions for 242 yards and a touchdown in nine games and starts. Swaim was a solid blocking tight end during his time with the Cowboys, but his development was limited by injuries.

=== Jacksonville Jaguars ===
On March 15, 2019, Swaim signed with the Jacksonville Jaguars. He began the season as the backup behind James O'Shaughnessy. On October 22, Swaim was placed on injured reserve with an ankle injury and a concussion. He appeared in just six games with two starts (when the team opened in a two tight ends formation), recording 13 receptions for 65 yards.

On March 17, 2020, Swaim was released by the Jaguars.

=== Tennessee Titans ===
==== 2020 season ====
On August 19, 2020, Swaim was signed by the Tennessee Titans to compete for the blocking tight end role with MyCole Pruitt.

Swaim was declared inactive for the first three games of the season. The Titans experienced a serious COVID-19 outbreak in Week 4, which opened the door for Swaim to start against the Buffalo Bills two weeks later. During a Week 13 31–10 road victory over his former team, the Jaguars, Swaim recorded three receptions for 34 yards and a touchdown. His second NFL touchdown came on a five-yard reception from Ryan Tannehill.

Swaim finished the 2020 season with nine receptions for 83 yards and a touchdown in 10 games with eight starts and ended up playing the second-most snaps among the tight ends.

==== 2021 season ====
On March 17, 2021, Swaim re-signed with the Titans on a one-year deal. With the departure of Jonnu Smith in free agency, Swaim was named the starting tight end to begin the season.

During Week 8 against the Indianapolis Colts, Swaim recorded five receptions for 23 yards and his first touchdown of the season in the 34–31 overtime road victory. In the next game against the Los Angeles Rams on Sunday Night Football, he had four receptions for 29 yards and a touchdown during the 28–16 road victory. Swaim did not play in Week 11 against the Houston Texans due to a concussion.

During a Week 14 20–0 shutout victory over the Jaguars, Swaim was the leading receiver with three receptions for a season-high 45 yards. Three weeks later against the Miami Dolphins, he caught his third touchdown of the season in the 34–3 blowout victory.

Swaim finished the 2021 season with a career-high 31 receptions for 210 yards and a career-high three touchdowns in 16 games and starts.

==== 2022 season ====
On March 14, 2022, Swaim signed a one-year contract extension with the Titans.

During the narrow season-opening 21–20 loss to the New York Giants, Swaim recorded three receptions for 19 yards. Two weeks later against the Las Vegas Raiders, he once again had three receptions for 19 yards along with his only touchdown of the season in the narrow 24–22 victory.

Swaim was mainly used for his blocking in the 2022 season, recording 12 receptions for 58 yards and a touchdown in 17 games and 13 starts.

=== Arizona Cardinals ===
On July 25, 2023, Swaim signed a one-year deal with the Arizona Cardinals.

During a Week 15 45–29 loss to the San Francisco 49ers, Swaim had a 26-yard reception before being carted off the field in the second quarter with a calf injury. He was placed on injured reserve three days later.

Swaim finished the 2023 season with 10 receptions for 94 yards in 14 games and eight starts.

=== Cleveland Browns ===
On September 11, 2024, Swaim was signed to the Cleveland Browns practice squad. He was promoted to the active roster on October 9. On November 30, Swaim was placed on injured reserve with a concussion.

Swaim finished the 2024 season with one reception for seven yards in eight games and two starts.

== Career statistics ==
=== NFL ===
==== Regular season ====
Year	Team	Games		Receiving					Fumbles	
Year	Team	GP	GS	Rec	Yds	Avg	Lng	TD	Fum	Lost
2015	DAL	1	0	0	0	0.0	0	0	0	0
2016	DAL	9	6	6	69	11.5	12	0	0	0
2017	DAL	15	2	2	25	12.5	20	0	0	0
2018	DAL	9	9	26	242	9.3	43	1	0	0
2019	JAX	6	2	13	65	5.0	9	0	0	0
2020	TEN	10	8	9	83	9.2	16	1	0	0
2021	TEN	16	16	31	210	6.8	26	3	0	0
2022	TEN	17	13	12	58	4.8	13	1	0	0
2023	ARI	14	8	10	94	9.4	26	0	0	0
2024	CLE	8	2	1	7	7.0	7	0	0	0
Career		108	67	111	853	7.7	43	6	0	0

==== Postseason ====
Year	Team	Games		Receiving					Fumbles	
Year	Team	GP	GS	Rec	Yds	Avg	Lng	TD	Fum	Lost
2016	DAL	0	0	Did not play due to injury						
2018	DAL	0	0	Did not play due to injury						
2020	TEN	1	1	1	5	5.0	5	0	0	0
2021	TEN	1	1	0	0	0.0	0	0	0	0
Career		2	2	1	5	5.0	5	0	0	0

=== College ===
Season	Team	GP	Receiving			
Season	Team	GP	Rec	Yds	Avg	TD
2013	Texas	3	3	14	4.7	0
2014	Texas	8	10	70	7.0	1
Career		11	13	84	6.5	1

== Personal life ==
Swaim's brother, Mycal, was a part of the Tampa Bay Buccaneers' 2014 preseason roster as a defensive back. Mycal attended college and played NCAA football at Eastern Michigan University.

Swaim is married to his high school sweetheart, Lauren Miller.
