= 2020 Dallas Cowboys season =

61st season in franchise history

- Owner: Jerry Jones
- General manager: Jerry Jones
- Head coach: Mike McCarthy
- Offensive coordinator: Kellen Moore
- Defensive coordinator: Mike Nolan
- Home stadium: AT&T Stadium

Results
- Record: 6–10
- Division place: 3rd NFC East
- Playoffs: Did not qualify
- Pro Bowlers: None

Uniform
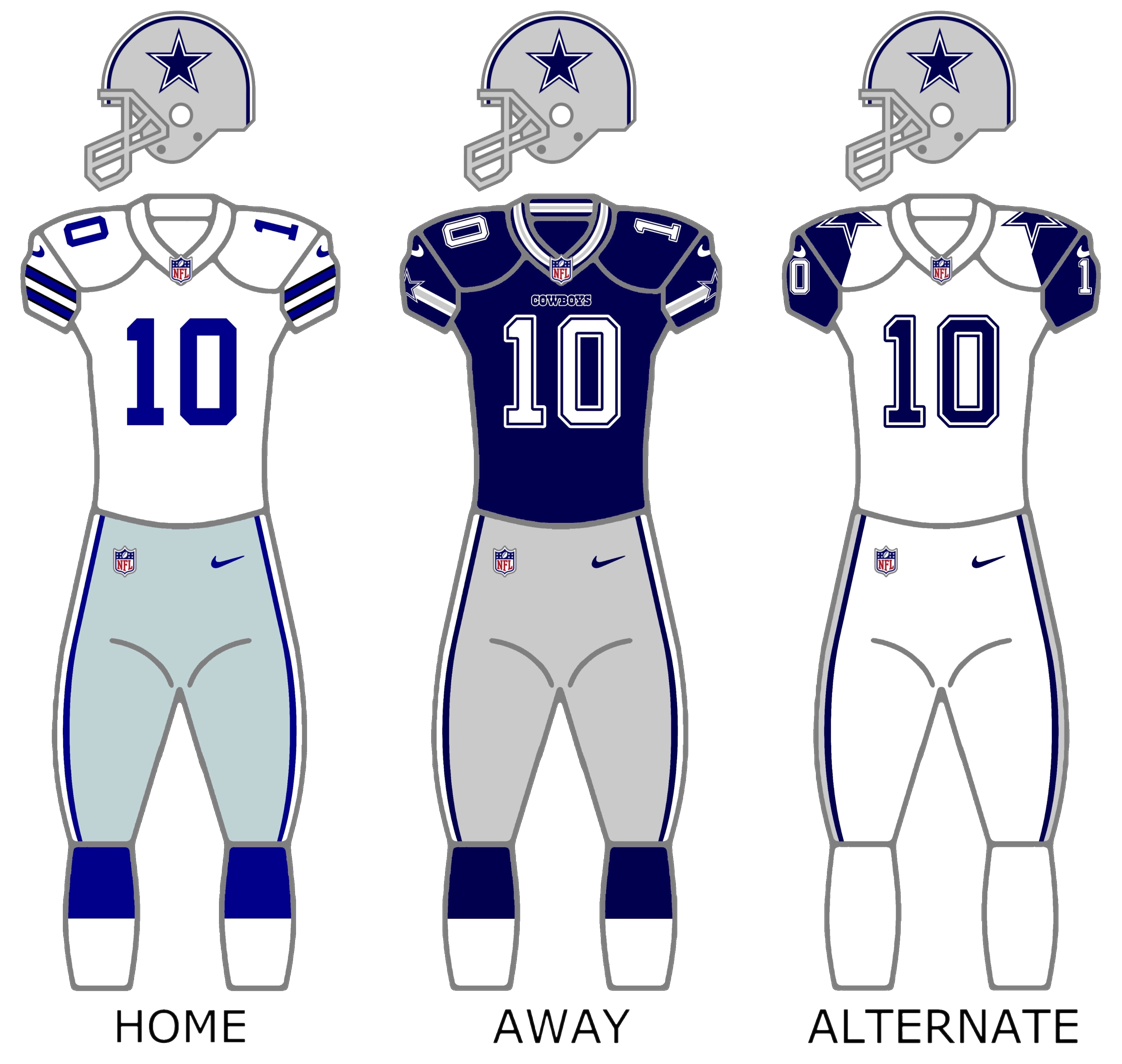

The 2020 season was the Dallas Cowboys' 61st in the National Football League (NFL), their 12th playing home games at AT&T Stadium, and their first under head coach Mike McCarthy. This was the first season since 2006 that Jason Garrett was not part of the coaching staff, as his contract expired on January 14, 2020. For the second time since 2002, tight end Jason Witten was not on the opening day roster, as he signed with the Las Vegas Raiders on March 17, 2020. For the first time since 2012, center Travis Frederick was not on the opening day roster, as he announced his retirement on March 23, 2020.

The Cowboys failed to improve upon their 8–8 season from the previous year after their Thanksgiving loss to the Washington Football Team. The next week, they were defeated by the Baltimore Ravens to suffer their first losing season since 2015. Factors in their struggles during the season included multiple key injuries, most notably starting quarterback Dak Prescott suffering a compound fracture and dislocation to his ankle during their Week 5 win against the New York Giants.

The team's defense surrendered a per-game average of 29.6 points over a total of 6,183 yards gained, a mark that would not be surpassed until 2025, when the team's defense allowed a per-game average of 30.1 points per game off a total of 6,409 yards gained, by which time the NFL had expanded the schedule to 17 games. The Cowboys were eliminated from playoff contention for the second consecutive year in Week 17 via their loss to the New York Giants.

== Offseason ==
=== Signings ===
Position	Player	Age	2019 team	Contract
QB	Andy Dalton	33	Cincinnati Bengals	1 year, $7 million
TE	Blake Bell	29	Kansas City Chiefs	1 year, $1.7 million
OT	Cameron Erving	28	Kansas City Chiefs	1 year, $2.5 million
DE	Everson Griffen (††)	33	Minnesota Vikings	1 year, $6 million
DE	Aldon Smith	31	Did not play	1 year, $4 million
DT	Dontari Poe (†)	30	Carolina Panthers	2 years, $10.5 million
DT	Gerald McCoy (*)	32	Carolina Panthers	3 years, $18.3 million
CB	Maurice Canady (**)	26	New York Jets	1 year, $1.25 million
CB	Brandon Carr (†)	34	Baltimore Ravens	1 year, $1.05 million
CB	Daryl Worley (†)	25	Oakland Raiders	1 year, $3 million
SS	Ha Ha Clinton-Dix (*)	27	Chicago Bears	1 year, $3.75 million
K	Greg Zuerlein	33	Los Angeles Rams	3 years, $7.5 million

(*) - Released before start of season

(**) - Opted out of season due to COVID

(†) - Later released

(††) - Later traded

=== Re-signings ===
Position	Player	Age	Contract
QB	Cooper Rush	27	1 year, $1.25 million
WR	Amari Cooper	26	5 years, $100 million
TE	Blake Jarwin	26	3 years, $24.25 million
C	Joe Looney	30	1 year, $2.4 million
C	Adam Redmond	27	1 year, $143,000
DT	Antwaun Woods	27	1 year, $750,000
LB	Sean Lee	34	1 year, $4.5 million
LB	Justin March	27	1 year, $1.04 million
LB	Joe Thomas	29	1 year, $1.25 million
CB	Anthony Brown	27	3 years, $15.5 million
CB	C. J. Goodwin	30	1 year, $1 million
FS	Darian Thompson	27	2 years, $2.8 million
LS	L. P. Ladouceur	39	1 year, $1.05 million

=== Departures ===
Position	Player	Age	2020 team
WR	Tavon Austin	30	Green Bay Packers
WR	Randall Cobb	30	Houston Texans
WR	Devin Smith	28	New England Patriots
TE	Jason Witten	38	Las Vegas Raiders
OT	Cameron Fleming	28	New York Giants
G	Xavier Su'a-Filo	29	Cincinnati Bengals
C	Travis Frederick	29	Retired
DE	Michael Bennett	35	Retired
DE	Kerry Hyder	29	San Francisco 49ers
DE	Jalen Jelks	24	Washington Football Team
DE	Robert Quinn	30	Chicago Bears
DT	Maliek Collins	25	Las Vegas Raiders
DT	Christian Covington	27	Cincinnati Bengals
DT	Daniel Ross	27	Jacksonville Jaguars
LB	Ray-Ray Armstrong	29	Seattle Seahawks
LB	Chris Covington	24	Indianapolis Colts
LB	Malcolm Smith	31	Cleveland Browns
CB	Byron Jones	28	Miami Dolphins
CB	Donovan Olumba	24	Unsigned
SS	Kavon Frazier	26	Miami Dolphins
SS	Jeff Heath	29	Las Vegas Raiders
K	Kai Forbath	33	Los Angeles Rams (via Chicago Bears)

=== Draft ===
2020 Dallas Cowboys draft
Round	Pick	Player	Position	College	Notes
1	17	CeeDee Lamb *	WR	Oklahoma	
2	51	Trevon Diggs *	CB	Alabama	
3	82	Neville Gallimore	DT	Oklahoma	
4	123	Reggie Robinson II	CB	Tulsa	
4	146	Tyler Biadasz *	C	Wisconsin	from Philadelphia
5	179	Bradlee Anae	DE	Utah	
7	231	Ben DiNucci	QB	James Madison	
Made roster † Pro Football Hall of Fame * Made at least one Pro Bowl during career

Notes

- The Cowboys traded their sixth-round selection to the Miami Dolphins in exchange for defensive end Robert Quinn.
- The Cowboys were awarded a fifth-round compensatory draft pick for the loss of Cole Beasley during the 2019 free agency period.

== Staff ==
2020 Dallas Cowboys staff
Front office: Owner/president/general manager – Jerry Jones; COO/Executive vice president/director of player personnel – Stephen Jones; Senior director of football operations/football administration – Todd Williams; Director of salary cap & player contracts – Adam Prasifka; Vice president player personnel – Will McClay; Director of college scouting – Lionel Vital; Director of pro scouting – Alex Loomis; Assistant director of college scouting – Chris Hall; Assistant to the Head Coach – Laura Fryar; Head coaches: Head coach – Mike McCarthy; Assistant head coach – Rob Davis; Offensive coaches: Offensive coordinator – Kellen Moore; Quarterbacks – Doug Nussmeier; Running backs – Skip Peete; Wide receivers – Adam Henry; Tight ends – Lunda Wells; Offensive line – Joe Philbin; Assistant offensive line – Jeff Blasko; Quality control/offense – Chase Haslett; Offensive assistant – Scott Tolzien; Quality control/analytics – Kyle Valero	Defensive coaches: Defensive coordinator – Mike Nolan; Defensive line – Jim Tomsula; Assistant defensive line – Leon Lett; Linebackers – Scott McCurley; Defensive backs – Al Harris; Defensive backs – Maurice Linguist; Senior defensive assistant – George Edwards; Quality control/analytics – Ryan Feder; Quality control/defense – Cannon Matthews; Special teams coaches: Special teams coordinator – John Fassel; Assistant special teams – Matt Daniels; Video/analytics – Justin Ruud; Quality control/analytics – Eric Simonelli; Strength and conditioning: Strength and conditioning coordinator – Markus Paul; Assistant strength and conditioning – Harold Nash Jr.; Assistant strength and conditioning – Kendall Smith

== Rosters ==
=== Opening preseason roster ===
Dallas Cowboys 2020 opening preseason roster
Quarterbacks: 14 Andy Dalton; 7 Ben DiNucci; 4 Dak Prescott; 5 Clayton Thorson; Running backs: 40 Darius Anderson; 42 Rico Dowdle; 21 Ezekiel Elliott; 45 Sewo Olonilua FB; 20 Tony Pollard; Wide receivers: 85 Noah Brown; 83 Ventell Bryant; 19 Amari Cooper; 13 Michael Gallup; 17 Tevin Jones; 88 CeeDee Lamb; 18 Aaron Parker; 16 Kendrick Rogers; 15 Devin Smith; 11 Cedrick Wilson Jr.; Tight ends: 80 Blake Bell; 87 Cole Hikutini; 89 Blake Jarwin; 84 Sean McKeon; 86 Dalton Schultz; 46 Charlie Taumoepeau	Offensive linemen: 60 Isaac Alarcón T (Int.); 63 Tyler Biadasz C; 71 La'el Collins T; 72 Cameron Erving G; 62 Marcus Henry C; 65 Mitch Hyatt T; 69 Brandon Knight T; 73 Joe Looney C; 70 Zack Martin G; 66 Connor McGovern G; 67 Wyatt Miller T; 61 Adam Redmond C; 77 Tyron Smith T; 74 Terence Steele T; 78 Cody Wichmann G; 52 Connor Williams G; Defensive linemen: 51 Bradlee Anae DE; 92 Dorance Armstrong DE; 68 Ron'Dell Carter DE; 75 Neville Gallimore DT; 79 Justin Hamilton DT; 76 LaDarius Hamilton DE; 97 Trysten Hill DT; 56 Joe Jackson DE; 96 Jalen Jelks DE; 90 DeMarcus Lawrence DE; 93 Gerald McCoy DT; 58 Aldon Smith DE; 99 Antwaun Woods DT	Linebackers: 44 Francis Bernard MLB; 57 Luke Gifford MLB; 50 Sean Lee OLB; 53 Justin March OLB; 54 Jaylon Smith OLB; 48 Joe Thomas OLB; 55 Leighton Vander Esch MLB; Defensive backs: 24 Chidobe Awuzie CB; 30 Anthony Brown CB; 33 Deante Burton CB; 27 Ha Ha Clinton-Dix SS; 31 Trevon Diggs CB; 29 C. J. Goodwin CB; 35 Luther Kirk SS; 26 Jourdan Lewis CB; 41 Reggie Robinson FS; 23 Darian Thompson S; 39 Chris Westry CB; 37 Donovan Wilson S; 25 Xavier Woods FS; 28 Daryl Worley CB/FS; Special teams: 6 Chris Jones P; 91 L. P. Ladouceur LS; 2 Greg Zuerlein K	Reserve lists: -- Maurice Canady CB (Opt-out); 98 Tyrone Crawford DT (Active/PUP); 94 Randy Gregory DE (Suspended); -- Stephen Guidry WR (Opt-out); 81 Jon'Vea Johnson WR (COVID-19); 43 Azur Kamara DE (IR); 49 Jamize Olawale FB (Opt-out); 95 Dontari Poe DT (Active/PUP); 32 Saivion Smith FS (COVID-19); 79 active (+1 exempt), 7 inactive

=== Week one roster ===
Dallas Cowboys 2020 week one roster
Quarterbacks: 14 Andy Dalton; 7 Ben DiNucci; 4 Dak Prescott; Running backs: 34 Rico Dowdle; 21 Ezekiel Elliott; 20 Tony Pollard; Wide receivers: 85 Noah Brown; 19 Amari Cooper; 13 Michael Gallup; 88 CeeDee Lamb; 17 Malik Turner; 11 Cedrick Wilson Jr.; Tight ends: 80 Blake Bell; 89 Blake Jarwin; 84 Sean McKeon; 86 Dalton Schultz	Offensive linemen: 63 Tyler Biadasz C; 75 Cameron Erving T; 69 Brandon Knight T; 73 Joe Looney C; 70 Zack Martin G; 66 Connor McGovern G; 77 Tyron Smith T; 78 Terence Steele T; 52 Connor Williams G; Defensive linemen: 56 Bradlee Anae DE; 92 Dorance Armstrong DE; 98 Tyrone Crawford DT; 96 Neville Gallimore DT; 97 Everson Griffen DT; 72 Trysten Hill DT; 90 DeMarcus Lawrence DE; 95 Dontari Poe DT; 58 Aldon Smith DE; 99 Antwaun Woods DT	Linebackers: 57 Luke Gifford MLB; 53 Justin March OLB; 54 Jaylon Smith OLB; 48 Joe Thomas OLB; 55 Leighton Vander Esch MLB; Defensive backs: 24 Chidobe Awuzie CB; 30 Anthony Brown CB; 39 Brandon Carr CB; 27 Trevon Diggs CB; 29 C. J. Goodwin CB; 26 Jourdan Lewis CB; 41 Reggie Robinson FS; 23 Darian Thompson SS; 37 Donovan Wilson SS/FS; 25 Xavier Woods FS; 28 Daryl Worley CB; Special teams: 6 Chris Jones P; 91 L. P. Ladouceur LS; 2 Greg Zuerlein K	Reserve lists: 83 Ventell Bryant WR (IR); -- Maurice Canady CB (Opt-out); 71 La'el Collins T (IR); 94 Randy Gregory DE (Exempt); -- Stephen Guidry WR (Opt-out); 65 Mitch Hyatt T (IR); 43 Azur Kamara ODE (IR); 50 Sean Lee OLB (IR); 49 Jamize Olawale FB (Opt-out); Practice Squad: 60 Isaac Alarcón OT (Int.); 44 Francis Bernard MLB; 33 Deante Burton CB; 51 Ron'Dell Carter DE; 79 Justin Hamilton DT; 76 LaDarius Hamilton DE; 62 Marcus Henry C; 87 Cole Hikutini TE; 81 Jon'Vea Johnson WR; 35 Luther Kirk SS; 36 Elijah McGuire RB; 45 Sewo Olonilua FB; 18 Aaron Parker WR; 67 Eric Smith OT; 32 Saivion Smith FS; 31 Chris Westry CB/FS; 54 Active, 9 Inactive, 15 practice squad (+1 exempt)

=== Final roster ===
2020 Dallas Cowboys roster
Quarterbacks (QB): 14 Andy Dalton; 7 Ben DiNucci; 3 Garrett Gilbert; Running backs (RB): 34 Rico Dowdle; 21 Ezekiel Elliott; 45 Sewo Olonilua; 20 Tony Pollard; Wide receivers (WR): 85 Noah Brown; 19 Amari Cooper; 13 Michael Gallup; 88 CeeDee Lamb; 17 Malik Turner; 11 Cedrick Wilson Jr.; Tight ends (TE): 80 Blake Bell; 84 Sean McKeon; 86 Dalton Schultz	Offensive linemen (OL): 63 Tyler Biadasz C; 69 Brandon Knight T; 73 Joe Looney C; 70 Zack Martin G/T; 66 Connor McGovern G; 64 Greg Senat T; 78 Terence Steele T; 52 Connor Williams G; Defensive linemen (DL): 56 Bradlee Anae DE; 95 Eli Ankou DT; 92 Dorance Armstrong DE; 97 Ron'Dell Carter DE; 98 Tyrone Crawford DT; 96 Neville Gallimore DT; 94 Randy Gregory DE; 90 DeMarcus Lawrence DE; 58 Aldon Smith DE	Linebackers (LB): 44 Francis Bernard OLB; 57 Luke Gifford OLB; 50 Sean Lee MLB; 54 Jaylon Smith OLB; 48 Joe Thomas MLB; 55 Leighton Vander Esch MLB; Defensive backs (DB): 24 Chidobe Awuzie CB; 30 Anthony Brown CB; 27 Trevon Diggs CB; 29 C. J. Goodwin CB; 26 Jourdan Lewis CB; 40 Steven Parker SS; 28 Rashard Robinson CB; 41 Reggie Robinson FS; 37 Donovan Wilson SS; 25 Xavier Woods FS; Special teams (ST): 91 L. P. Ladouceur LS; 1 Hunter Niswander P; 2 Greg Zuerlein K	Practice squad: 60 Isaac Alarcón T (IPP); 36 Kemon Hall CB; 76 LaDarius Hamilton DE; 62 Marcus Henry C; 87 Cole Hikutini TE; 81 Jon'Vea Johnson WR; 15 Chris Lacy WR; 68 Jordan Mills T; 93 Walter Palmore DT; 18 Aaron Parker WR; 51 Adam Redmond C/G; 10 Cooper Rush QB; 67 Eric Smith T; 32 Saivion Smith CB (PS/I); 53 Breeland Speaks DE; 61 William Sweet T; 31 Chris Westry CB (PS/I); Reserve: 33 Deante Burton CB (IR); -- Maurice Canady CB (Opt-out); 71 La'el Collins T (IR); 75 Cameron Erving T (IR); -- Stephen Guidry WR (Opt-out); 79 Justin Hamilton DT (COVID-19); 72 Trysten Hill DT (IR); 65 Mitch Hyatt T (IR); 89 Blake Jarwin TE (IR); 6 Chris Jones P (IR); 43 Azur Kamara OLB (IR); 59 Justin March OLB (IR); 49 Jamize Olawale FB (Opt-out); 4 Dak Prescott QB (IR); 77 Tyron Smith T (IR); 23 Darian Thompson SS (COVID-19); 99 Antwaun Woods DT (IR); Rookies in italics 52 active, 17 reserve, 14 practice squad (3 exempt)

== Preseason ==
The Cowboys would have played the Pittsburgh Steelers in the Pro Football Hall of Fame Game on August 6, at Tom Benson Hall of Fame Stadium in Canton, Ohio, and the Cowboys were to be represented by head coach Jimmy Johnson and safety Cliff Harris. However, the game, the annual Hall of Fame enshrinement and the remainder of the preseason were later cancelled due to the COVID-19 pandemic, and the Hall of Fame game between the Cowboys and Steelers was rescheduled for 2021.

Week	Date	Opponent	Venue	Result
HOF	August 6	vs. Pittsburgh Steelers	Tom Benson Hall of Fame Stadium	Cancelled due to the COVID-19 pandemic
1	August 16	at Los Angeles Chargers	SoFi Stadium	Cancelled due to the COVID-19 pandemic
2	August 22	Baltimore Ravens	AT&T Stadium	Cancelled due to the COVID-19 pandemic
3	August 29	Kansas City Chiefs	AT&T Stadium	Cancelled due to the COVID-19 pandemic
4	September 3	at Houston Texans	NRG Stadium	Cancelled due to the COVID-19 pandemic

== Regular season ==
=== Schedule ===
The Cowboys' 2020 schedule was announced on May 7.

Week	Date	Opponent	Result	Record	Venue	Recap
1	September 13	at Los Angeles Rams	**L** 17–20	0–1	SoFi Stadium	Recap
2	September 20	Atlanta Falcons	**W** 40–39	1–1	AT&T Stadium	Recap
3	September 27	at Seattle Seahawks	**L** 31–38	1–2	CenturyLink Field	Recap
4	October 4	Cleveland Browns	**L** 38–49	1–3	AT&T Stadium	Recap
5	October 11	**New York Giants**	**W** 37–34	2–3	AT&T Stadium	Recap
6	October 19	Arizona Cardinals	**L** 10–38	2–4	AT&T Stadium	Recap
7	October 25	at **Washington Football Team**	**L** 3–25	2–5	FedExField	Recap
8	November 1	at **Philadelphia Eagles**	**L** 9–23	2–6	Lincoln Financial Field	Recap
9	November 8	Pittsburgh Steelers	**L** 19–24	2–7	AT&T Stadium	Recap
10	Bye					
11	November 22	at Minnesota Vikings	**W** 31–28	3–7	U.S. Bank Stadium	Recap
12	November 26	**Washington Football Team**	**L** 16–41	3–8	AT&T Stadium	Recap
13	December 8 (Note: The Cowboys' Week 13 game at the Baltimore Ravens, originally scheduled for Thursday Night Football on December 3, was moved to December 8 due to a COVID-19 outbreak within the Ravens' organization that forced the Ravens' Week 12 game at the Pittsburgh Steelers, originally scheduled for November 26, to be pushed back to December 1.)	at Baltimore Ravens	**L** 17–34	3–9	M&T Bank Stadium	Recap
14	December 13	at Cincinnati Bengals	**W** 30–7	4–9	Paul Brown Stadium	Recap
15	December 20	San Francisco 49ers	**W** 41–33	5–9	AT&T Stadium	Recap
16	December 27	**Philadelphia Eagles**	**W** 37–17	6–9	AT&T Stadium	Recap
17	January 3	at **New York Giants**	**L** 19–23	6–10	MetLife Stadium	Recap

Note: Intra-division opponents are in bold text.

=== Game summaries ===
==== Week 1: at Los Angeles Rams ====
Week One: Dallas Cowboys at Los Angeles Rams – Game summary

Quarter	1	2	3	4	Total
Cowboys	0	14	3	0	**17**
**Rams**	7	6	7	0	**20**

at SoFi Stadium, Inglewood, California

- Date: September 13
- Game time: 7:20 p.m. CDT/5:20 p.m. PDT
- Game weather: Cloudy, 72 °F (22 °C)
- Game attendance: 0
- Referee: Tony Corrente
- TV announcers (NBC): Al Michaels, Cris Collinsworth, Michele Tafoya and Terry McAulay
- Recap, Game Book

Game information

**First quarter**

- LAR – Malcolm Brown 1-yard run (Sam Sloman kick), 11:37. Rams 7–0. **Drive: 7 plays, 75 yards, 3:23.**

**Second quarter**

- DAL – Ezekiel Elliott 19-yard pass from Dak Prescott (Greg Zuerlein kick), 12:24. Tied 7–7. **Drive: 8 plays, 80 yards, 2:38.**
- LAR – Sam Sloman 35-yard field goal, 8:42. Rams 10-7. **Drive: 11 plays, 58 yards, 3:42.**
- LAR – Sam Sloman 31-yard field goal, 1:56. Rams 13–7. **Drive: 7 plays, 44 yards, 3:16.**
- DAL – Ezekiel Elliott 1-yard run (Greg Zuerlein kick), 0:17. Cowboys 14-13. **Drive: 9 plays, 73 yards, 1:39.**

**Third quarter**

- LAR – Malcolm Brown 2-yard run (Sam Sloman kick), 5:33. Rams 20–14. **Drive: 11 plays, 85 yards, 5:51.**
- DAL – Greg Zuerlein 33-yard field goal, 1:50. Rams 20–17. **Drive: 6 plays, 24 yards, 1:53.**

**Fourth quarter**

- No scoring plays.

**Top passers**

- DAL – Dak Prescott – 25/39, 266 yards, TD
- LAR – Jared Goff – 20/31, 275 yards, INT

**Top rushers**

- DAL – Ezekiel Elliott – 22 rushes, 96 yards, TD
- LAR – Malcolm Brown – 18 rushes, 79 yards, 2 TD

**Top receivers**

- DAL – Michael Gallup – 10 receptions, 81 yards
- LAR – Robert Woods – 6 receptions, 105 yards

Despite a fourth quarter comeback attempt, the Cowboys were unable to tie the game or take the lead after wide receiver Michael Gallup was controversially called for offensive pass interference, negating a 47-yard pass from quarterback Dak Prescott and leading to the Cowboys' final drive stalling. With the loss, Dallas started the season at 0–1.

==== Week 2: vs. Atlanta Falcons ====
Week Two: Atlanta Falcons at Dallas Cowboys – Game summary

Quarter	1	2	3	4	Total
Falcons	20	9	0	10	**39**
**Cowboys**	0	10	14	16	**40**

at AT&T Stadium, Arlington, Texas

- Date: September 20
- Game time: 12:00 p.m. CDT
- Game weather: Sunny, 73 °F (23 °C) (retractable roof open)
- Game attendance: 21,708
- Referee: Brad Rogers
- TV announcers (Fox): Kevin Burkhardt, Daryl Johnston and Pam Oliver
- Recap, Game Book

Game information

**First quarter**

- ATL – Calvin Ridley 22-yard pass from Matt Ryan (Younghoe Koo kick), 10:58. Falcons 7–0. **Drive: 1 play, 22 yards, 0:08.**
- ATL – Hayden Hurst 42-yard pass from Calvin Ridley (Younghoe Koo kick), 7:37. Falcons 14–0. **Drive: 4 plays, 52 yards, 1:49.**
- ATL – Younghoe Koo 42-yard field goal, 4:26. Falcons 17–0. **Drive: 4 plays, 5 yards, 1:26.**
- ATL – Younghoe Koo 27-yard field goal, 1:06. Falcons 20–0. **Drive: 7 plays, 31 yards, 3:04.**

**Second quarter**

- DAL – Ezekiel Elliott 1-yard run (Greg Zuerlein kick), 12:09. Falcons 20–7. **Drive: 11 plays, 75 yards, 3:57.**
- ATL – Calvin Ridley 3-yard pass from Matt Ryan (pass failed), 5:58. Falcons 26–7. **Drive: 12 plays, 75 yards, 6:11.**
- DAL – Greg Zuerlein 33-yard field goal, 1:46. Falcons 26–10. **Drive: 11 plays, 60 yards, 4:12.**
- ATL – Younghoe Koo 41-yard field goal, 0:02. Falcons 29–10. **Drive: 7 plays, 56 yards, 1:44.**

**Third quarter**

- DAL – Dak Prescott 2-yard run (Greg Zuerlein kick), 12:23. Falcons 29–17. **Drive: 7 plays, 74 yards, 2:37.**
- DAL – Dak Prescott 1-yard run (Greg Zuerlein kick), 4:14. Falcons 29–24. **Drive: 8 plays, 83 yards, 2:47.**

**Fourth quarter**

- ATL – Russell Gage 8-yard pass from Matt Ryan (Younghoe Koo kick), 14:23. Falcons 36–24. **Drive: 11 plays, 74 yards, 4:51.**
- ATL – Younghoe Koo 32-yard field goal, 7:57. Falcons 39–24. **Drive: 10 plays, 30 yards, 4:49.**
- DAL – Dalton Schultz 10-yard pass from Dak Prescott (run failed), 4:57. Falcons 39–30. **Drive: 10 plays, 75 yards, 3:00.**
- DAL – Dak Prescott 1-yard run (Greg Zuerlein kick), 1:49. Falcons 39–37. **Drive: 9 plays, 76 yards, 1:08.**
- DAL – Greg Zuerlein 46-yard field goal, 0:00. Cowboys 40–39. **Drive: 6 plays, 26 yards, 1:49.**

**Top passers**

- ATL – Matt Ryan – 24/36, 273 yards, 4 TD
- DAL – Dak Prescott – 34/47, 450 yards, TD

**Top rushers**

- ATL – Todd Gurley – 21 rushes, 61 yards, TD
- DAL – Ezekiel Elliott – 22 rushes, 89 yards, TD

**Top receivers**

- ATL – Calvin Ridley – 7 receptions, 109 yards, 2 TD
- DAL – CeeDee Lamb – 6 receptions, 106 yards

The game began with the Cowboys falling behind 20–0 at the heaviest deficit. The Cowboys would start fighting back with Ezekiel Elliott's touchdown in the second quarter. The Falcons would re-boost their lead but failed the two-point conversion attempt. At halftime, the Cowboys would trail 29–10. Dak Prescott ran for two more touchdowns to cut the Falcons lead to 29–24. The Falcons added another ten points as the Cowboys trailed 39–24. Late in the fourth quarter, the Cowboys scored 16 unanswered points to prevent the Cowboys from starting 0–2, as well as sending the Falcons to their first 0–2 start since 2007. They finished the comeback after they successfully recovered a Greg Zuerlein onside kick with 1:49 left in the game and drove down to the 30 yard-line, where Zuerlein kicked a 46-yard field goal as time expired. This was the first time Dallas successfully kicked an onside kick since Week 17 of the 2014 season. With their first win, the Cowboys improved to 1–1 on the season. This win also makes the Cowboys the first team in NFL history to allow at least 39 points and win without defensive takeaways.

==== Week 3: at Seattle Seahawks ====
Week Three: Dallas Cowboys at Seattle Seahawks – Game summary

Quarter	1	2	3	4	Total
Cowboys	9	6	7	9	**31**
**Seahawks**	9	14	7	8	**38**

at CenturyLink Field, Seattle, Washington

- Date: September 27
- Game time: 3:25 p.m. CDT/1:25 p.m. PDT
- Game weather: Sunny, 63 °F (17 °C)
- Game attendance: 0
- Referee: Carl Cheffers
- TV announcers (Fox): Joe Buck, Troy Aikman and Erin Andrews
- Recap, Game Book

Game information

**First quarter**

- DAL – Greg Zuerlein 43-yard field goal, 8:10. Cowboys 3–0. **Drive: 13 play, 55 yards, 5:20.**
- SEA – Tyler Lockett 43-yard pass from Russell Wilson (Jason Myers kick), 6:39. Seahawks 7–3. **Drive: 4 play, 75 yards, 1:31.**
- SEA – Ezekiel Elliott tackled in end zone by Bryan Mone for a safety, 6:36. Seahawks 9–3.
- DAL – Ezekiel Elliott 1-yard run (kick failed), 1:40. Tied 9–9. **Drive: 8 play, 65 yards, 3:07.**

**Second quarter**

- SEA – Tyler Lockett 1-yard pass from Russell Wilson (Jason Myers kick), 6:53. Seahawks 16–9. **Drive: 11 play, 71 yards, 4:38.**
- DAL – Cedrick Wilson Jr. 40-yard pass from Dak Prescott (kick blocked), 6:05. Seahawks 16–15. **Drive: 3 play, 75 yards, 0:48.**
- SEA – Tyler Lockett 1-yard pass from Russell Wilson (Jason Myers kick), 0:07. Seahawks 23–15. **Drive: 5 play, 34 yards, 0:29.**

**Third quarter**

- SEA – Jacob Hollister 1-yard pass from Russell Wilson (Jason Myers kick), 14:14. Seahawks 30–15. **Drive: 2 play, 5 yards, 0:38.**
- DAL – Cedrick Wilson Jr. 42-yard pass from Dak Prescott (Greg Zuerlein kick), 5:47. Seahawks 30–22. **Drive: 3 play, 94 yards, 0:39.**

**Fourth quarter**

- DAL – Michael Gallup 43-yard pass from Dak Prescott (pass failed), 13:07. Seahawks 30–28. **Drive: 9 play, 89 yards, 3:22.**
- DAL – Greg Zuerlein 42-yard field goal, 3:59. Cowboys 31–30. **Drive: 16 play, 70 yards, 5:55.**
- SEA – DK Metcalf 29-yard pass from Russell Wilson (Russell Wilson-Jacob Hollister pass), 1:47. Seahawks 38–31. **Drive: 8 play, 75 yards, 2:12.**

**Top passers**

- DAL – Dak Prescott – 37/57, 473 yards, 3 TD, 2 INT
- SEA – Russell Wilson – 27/40, 315 yards, 5 TD

**Top rushers**

- DAL – Ezekiel Elliott – 14 rushes, 34 yards, TD
- SEA – Chris Carson – 14 rushes, 64 yards

**Top receivers**

- DAL – Michael Gallup – 6 receptions, 138 yards, TD
- SEA – DK Metcalf – 4 receptions, 110 yards, TD

Despite initially battling back to take a 31–30 lead late in the 4th quarter, the defense allowed the Seattle offense to score a go-ahead touchdown with 1:47 left to play. The Cowboys would drive into Seattle territory, but the Seahawks would intercept Prescott in the end zone with just six seconds left. With this loss, the Cowboys dropped to 1–2 on the season.

==== Week 4: vs. Cleveland Browns ====
Week Four: Cleveland Browns at Dallas Cowboys – Game summary

Quarter	1	2	3	4	Total
**Browns**	7	24	10	8	**49**
Cowboys	14	0	0	24	**38**

at AT&T Stadium, Arlington, Texas

- Date: October 4
- Game time: 12:00 p.m. CDT
- Game weather: None (retractable roof closed)
- Game attendance: 25,021
- Referee: Clay Martin
- TV announcers (Fox): Kevin Burkhardt, Daryl Johnston, and Pam Oliver
- Recap, Game Book

Game information

**First quarter**

- CLE – Odell Beckham Jr. 37-yard pass from Jarvis Landry (Cody Parkey kick), 12:13. Browns 7–0. **Drive: 4 plays, 69 yards, 1:09**
- DAL – CeeDee Lamb 43-yard pass from Dak Prescott (Greg Zuerlein kick), 9:53. Tied 7–7. **Drive: 5 plays, 88 yards, 2:20**
- DAL – Amari Cooper 20-yard pass from Dak Prescott (Greg Zuerlein kick), 9:53. Cowboys 14–7. **Drive: 9 plays, 84 yards, 4:02**

**Second quarter**

- CLE – Odell Beckham Jr. 4-yard pass from Baker Mayfield (Cody Parkey kick), 13:07. Tied 14–14. **Drive: 9 plays, 75 yards, 4:01**
- CLE – Austin Hooper 1-yard pass from Baker Mayfield (Cody Parkey kick), 9:22. Browns 21–14. **Drive: 4 plays, 34 yards, 1:53**
- CLE – Kareem Hunt 2-yard run (Cody Parkey kick), 9:22. Browns 28–14. **Drive: 6 plays, 51 yards, 1:47**
- CLE – Cody Parkey 37-yard field goal, 0:00. Browns 31–14. **Drive: 13 plays, 71 yards, 3:53**

**Third quarter**

- CLE – Kareem Hunt 14-yard run (Cody Parkey kick), 10:51. Browns 38–14. **Drive: 7 plays, 70 yards, 4:09**
- CLE – Cody Parkey 44-yard field goal, 0:40. Browns 41–14. **Drive: 8 plays, 40 yards, 4:46**

**Fourth quarter**

- DAL – Tony Pollard 3-yard run (Dak Prescott-Ezekiel Elliott pass), 12:24. Browns 41–22. **Drive: 11 plays, 77 yards, 3:16**
- DAL – Dalton Schultz 26-yard pass from Dak Prescott (Dak Prescott run), 6:31. Browns 41–30. **Drive: 7 plays, 84 yards, 1:50**
- DAL – CeeDee Lamb 5-yard pass from Dak Prescott (Amari Cooper run), 3:42. Browns 41–38. **Drive: 11 plays, 80 yards, 2:18**
- CLE – Odell Beckham Jr. 50-yard run (Stephen Carlson run), 3:25. Browns 49–38. **Drive: 1 play, 50 yards, 0:17**

**Top passers**

- CLE – Baker Mayfield – 19/30, 165 yards, 2 TD
- DAL – Dak Prescott – 41/58, 502 yards, 4 TD, INT

**Top rushers**

- CLE – D'Ernest Johnson – 13 rushes, 95 yards
- DAL – Ezekiel Elliott – 12 rushes, 54 yards

**Top receivers**

- CLE – Odell Beckham Jr. – 5 receptions, 81 yards, 2 TD
- DAL – Amari Cooper – 12 receptions, 134 yards, TD

The Cowboys defense had no answers for the Browns' rushing attack. Despite initially leading 14–7, the Cowboys allowed 34 unanswered points by the end of the 3rd quarter. The Cowboys would cut the lead to 41-38 late in the 4th quarter, but the Browns proved they were too strong for the Cowboys as they ran away with the 49–38 win.

With this loss, the Cowboys dropped to 1–3 on the season. This was also the first time since 1994 that the Cowboys lost to the Browns.

==== Week 5: vs. New York Giants ====
Week Five: New York Giants at Dallas Cowboys – Game summary

Quarter	1	2	3	4	Total
Giants	14	6	3	11	**34**
**Cowboys**	3	21	7	6	**37**

at AT&T Stadium, Arlington, Texas

- Date: October 11
- Game time: 3:25 p.m. CDT
- Game weather: Clear, 95 °F (35 °C) (retractable roof open)
- Game attendance: 25,147
- Referee: Craig Wrolstad
- TV announcers (CBS): Jim Nantz, Tony Romo, Tracy Wolfson, and Gene Steratore
- Recap, Game Book

Game information

**First quarter**

- DAL – Greg Zuerlein 24-yard field goal, 11:20. Cowboys 3–0. **Drive: 11 plays, 54 yards, 3:40.**
- NYG – Evan Engram 3-yard run (Graham Gano kick), 6:53. Giants 7–3. **Drive: 7 plays, 70 yards, 4:27.**
- NYG – Kyler Fackrell 46-yard interception return (Graham Gano kick), 5:48. Giants 14–3.

**Second quarter**

- NYG – Graham Gano 55-yard field goal, 13:30. Giants 17–3. **Drive: 12 plays, 38 yards, 5:51.**
- DAL – Ezekiel Elliott 1-yard run (Greg Zuerlein kick), 6:31. Giants 17–10. **Drive: 14 plays, 70 yards, 6:59.**
- DAL – Anthony Brown 29-yard fumble return (Greg Zuerlein kick), 5:00. Tied 17–17.
- NYG – Graham Gano 50-yard field goal, 0:51. Giants 20–17. **Drive: 9 plays, 48 yards, 4:09.**
- DAL – Dak Prescott 11-yard pass from Cedrick Wilson Jr. via their own version of the Philly Special (Greg Zuerlein kick), 0:16. Cowboys 24–20. **Drive: 6 plays, 64 yards, 0:35.**

**Third quarter**

- NYG – Graham Gano 54-yard field goal, 9:25. Cowboys 24–23. **Drive: 10 plays, 39 yards, 5:35.**
- DAL – Ezekiel Elliott 12-yard run (Greg Zuerlein kick), 5:03. Cowboys 31–23. **Drive: 10 plays, 79 yards, 4:22.**

**Fourth quarter**

- NYG – Graham Gano 28-yard field goal, 11:09. Cowboys 31–26. **Drive: 9 plays, 66 yards, 5:11.**
- NYG – Devonta Freeman 4-yard run (Daniel Jones-Andrew Thomas pass), 8:46. Giants 34–31. **Drive: 5 plays, 17 yards, 2:09.**
- DAL – Greg Zuerlein 40-yard field goal, 1:56. Tied 34–34. **Drive: 12 plays, 38 yards, 6:50.**
- DAL – Greg Zuerlein 34-yard field goal, 0:00. Cowboys 37–34. **Drive: 5 plays, 72 yards, 0:52.**

**Top passers**

- NYG – Daniel Jones – 20/33, 222 yards
- DAL – Dak Prescott – 14/21, 166 yards, INT

**Top rushers**

- NYG – Devonta Freeman – 17 rushes, 60 yards, TD
- DAL – Ezekiel Elliott – 19 rushes, 91 yards, 2 TD

**Top receivers**

- NYG – Darius Slayton – 20 receptions, 20 yards
- DAL – CeeDee Lamb – 14 receptions, 166 yards

Former head coach Jason Garrett, now offensive coordinator of the rival Giants, made his first return to Dallas since leaving the team following the previous season. The game turned into an offensive shootout, with the lead changing multiple times. The Cowboys claimed victory after scoring two consecutive field goals in the final minutes of the game, improving to 2–3 after beating the still-winless Giants. During a tackle made by Giants Logan Ryan in the third quarter with 6:46 remaining, Dak Prescott suffered compound fracture and dislocation injuries to his right ankle, ending his season. Former Cincinnati Bengals quarterback Andy Dalton finished the comeback for the Cowboys. This win was proven costly as the Cowboys would only win four more games in Prescott's absence.

==== Week 6: vs. Arizona Cardinals ====
Week Six: Arizona Cardinals at Dallas Cowboys – Game summary

Quarter	1	2	3	4	Total
**Cardinals**	0	21	7	10	**38**
Cowboys	0	3	0	7	**10**

at AT&T Stadium, Arlington, Texas

- Date: October 19
- Game time: 7:15 p.m. CDT
- Game weather: Clear, 64 °F (18 °C) (retractable roof open)
- Game attendance: 25,174
- Referee: Clete Blakeman
- TV announcers (ESPN): Steve Levy, Brian Griese, Louis Riddick, Lisa Salters and John Parry
- Recap, Game Book

Game information

**First quarter**

- No scoring plays.

**Second quarter**

- ARI – Christian Kirk 6-yard pass from Kyler Murray (Zane Gonzalez kick), 12:58. Cardinals 7–0. **Drive: 11 plays, 54 yards, 4:38.**
- ARI – Kenyan Drake 1-yard run (Zane Gonzalez kick), 10:31. Cardinals 14–0. **Drive: 5 plays, 27 yards, 1:39.**
- ARI – Christian Kirk 80-yard pass from Kyler Murray (Zane Gonzalez kick), 4:43. Cardinals 21–0. **Drive: 1 play, 80 yards, 0:10.**
- DAL – Greg Zuerlein 34-yard field goal, 0:10. Cardinals 21–3. **Drive: 14 plays, 50 yards, 4:33.**

**Third quarter**

- ARI – Kyler Murray 1-yard run (Zane Gonzalez kick), 7:53. Cardinals 28–3. **Drive: 9 plays, 79 yards, 4:32.**

**Fourth quarter**

- ARI – Zane Gonzalez 26-yard field goal, 8:54. Cardinals 31–3. **Drive: 9 plays, 82 yards, 4:24.**
- DAL – Amari Cooper 1-yard pass from Andy Dalton (Greg Zuerlein kick), 2:48. Cardinals 31–10. **Drive: 18 plays, 75 yards, 6:06.**
- ARI – Kenyan Drake 69-yard run (Zane Gonzalez kick), 1:49. Cardinals 38–10. **Drive: 3 plays, 75 yards, 0:59.**

**Top passers**

- ARI – Kyler Murray – 9/24, 188 yards, 2 TD
- DAL – Andy Dalton – 34/54, 266 yards, TD, 2 INT

**Top rushers**

- ARI – Kenyan Drake – 20 rushes, 164 yards, 2 TD
- DAL – Ezekiel Elliott – 12 rushes, 49 yards

**Top passers**

- ARI – Christian Kirk – 2 receptions, 86 yards, 2 TD
- DAL – Amari Cooper – 7 receptions, 79 yards, TD

Dallas concluded its three-game homestand on Monday Night Football against the Arizona Cardinals, with Andy Dalton making his first start in a Cowboys uniform in place of the injured Dak Prescott. However, Prescott's absence would quickly be felt as the Cowboys would struggle on both sides of the ball throughout the game. The Cardinals raced out to a 21–0 lead in the second quarter and never looked back, taking advantage of two fumbles by Ezekiel Elliott and adding an 80-yard touchdown reception by Christian Kirk. The Cowboys offense committed a season-high four turnovers, all of which led to Cardinals scoring drives. Moreover, Dalton struggled in his Cowboys debut, throwing two interceptions and finishing with a 65.8 passer rating. With the 38–10 blowout loss, Dallas dropped to 2–4 for the first time since the 2015 season. The 28-point loss marked their worst at home since losing 37–9 to the Philadelphia Eagles in Week 11 of the 2017 season, and tied that loss for their worst margin of defeat at AT&T Stadium.

==== Week 7: at Washington Football Team ====
Week Seven: Dallas Cowboys at Washington Football Team – Game summary

Quarter	1	2	3	4	Total
Cowboys	3	0	0	0	**3**
**Washington**	9	13	0	3	**25**

at FedEx Field, Landover, Maryland

- Date: October 25
- Game time: 1:00 p.m. EDT/12:00 p.m. CDT
- Game weather: Cloudy, 46 °F (8 °C)
- Game attendance: 0
- Referee: Ronald Torbert
- TV announcers (Fox): Joe Davis, Daryl Johnston, and Pam Oliver
- Recap, Game Book

Game information

**First quarter**

- WAS – Dalton Schultz tackled in end zone by Jonathan Allen for a safety, 7:45. Football Team 2–0.
- WAS – Antonio Gibson 12-yard run (Dustin Hopkins kick), 3:48. Football Team 9–0. **Drive: 7 plays, 63 yards, 3:57.**
- DAL – Greg Zuerlein 45-yard field goal, 1:52. Football Team 9–3. **Drive: 4 plays, 7 yards, 1:56.**

**Second quarter**

- WAS – Terry McLaurin 52-yard pass from Kyle Allen (pass failed), 9:54. Football Team 15–3. **Drive: 2 plays, 55 yards, 0:46.**
- WAS – Logan Thomas 15-yard pass from Kyle Allen (Dustin Hopkins kick), 3:08. Football Team 22–3. **Drive: 10 plays, 60 yards, 4:05.**

**Third quarter**

- No scoring plays.

**Fourth quarter**

- WAS – Dustin Hopkins 30-yard field goal, 13:23. Football Team 25–3. **Drive: 11 plays, 63 yards, 4:38.**

**Top passers**

- DAL – Andy Dalton – 9/19, 75 yards, INT
- WAS – Kyle Allen – 15/25, 194 yards, 2 TD

**Top rushers**

- DAL – Ezekiel Elliott – 12 rushes, 45 yards
- WAS – Antonio Gibson – 20 rushes, 128 yards, TD

**Top receivers**

- DAL – Amari Cooper – 7 receptions, 80 yards
- WAS – Terry McLaurin – 7 receptions, 90 yards, TD, INT

The situation went from bad to worse for the Cowboys, who had no answers for Washington's defense. After a goal-line stand on Washington's opening drive, a strip sack by Landon Collins on Andy Dalton led to an early Washington safety. Washington then marched down the field, extending their lead to 9–0 on a 12-yard touchdown run by Antonio Gibson. The Cowboys responded with their only points of the afternoon on a Greg Zuerlein field goal. However, Washington would score two more touchdowns in the second quarter to put the game out of reach for Dallas. With this loss, Dallas dropped to 2–5 on the season, and 0–2 without Dak Prescott. Quarterback Andy Dalton would leave the game in the third quarter following a late hit by Washington linebacker Jon Bostic, who was subsequently ejected. Rookie quarterback Ben DiNucci would finish the game in place of Dalton, who was evaluated for a concussion.

==== Week 8: at Philadelphia Eagles ====
Week Eight: Dallas Cowboys at Philadelphia Eagles – Game summary

Quarter	1	2	3	4	Total
Cowboys	3	6	0	0	**9**
**Eagles**	7	0	8	8	**23**

at Lincoln Financial Field, Philadelphia, Pennsylvania

- Date: November 1
- Game time: 8:20 p.m. EST/7:20 p.m. CST
- Game weather: Cloudy, 49 °F (9 °C)
- Game attendance: 5,500
- Referee: Jerome Boger
- TV announcers (NBC): Al Michaels, Cris Collinsworth, Michele Tafoya and Terry McAulay
- Recap, Game Book

Game information

**First quarter**

- DAL – Greg Zuerlein 49-yard field goal, 10:11. Cowboys 3–0. **Drive: 9 plays, 47 yards, 4:49.**
- PHI – Jalen Reagor 2-yard pass from Carson Wentz (Jake Elliott kick), 0:02. Eagles 7–3. **Drive: 10 plays, 83 yards, 5:46.**

**Second quarter**

- DAL – Greg Zuerlein 49-yard field goal, 9:46. Eagles 7–6. **Drive: 6 plays, 15 yards, 1:44.**
- DAL – Greg Zuerlein 59-yard field goal, 0:06. Cowboys 9–7. **Drive: 5 plays, 14 yards, 0:23.**

**Third quarter**

- PHI – Travis Fulgham 9-yard pass from Carson Wentz (Carson Wentz-Jalen Reagor pass), 1:54. Eagles 15–9. **Drive: 9 plays, 58 yards, 4:19.**

**Fourth quarter**

- PHI – Rodney McLeod 53-yard fumble return (run failed), 5:18. Eagles 21–9.
- PHI – L. P. Ladouceur fumble out of bounds in the end zone for a Safety, 3:55. Eagles 23–9. **Drive: 9 plays, 58 yards, 4:19.**

**Top passers**

- DAL – Ben DiNucci – 21/40, 180 yards
- PHI – Carson Wentz – 15/27, 123 yards, 2 TD, 2 INT

**Top rushers**

- DAL – Ezekiel Elliott – 19 rushes, 63 yards
- PHI – Boston Scott – 15 rushes, 70 yards

**Top receivers**

- DAL – Michael Gallup – 7 receptions, 61 yards
- PHI – Travis Fulgham – 6 receptions, 78 yards, TD

With Andy Dalton ruled out due to the concussion he suffered during the Week 7 loss to Washington, rookie quarterback Ben DiNucci made his first NFL start as the Cowboys visited the rival Philadelphia Eagles in a key NFC East showdown. The Cowboys' struggling defense stepped up against the sputtering Eagles offense, forcing a season-high four turnovers and holding Philadelphia to seven first half points. However, Dallas' offense had struggles of its own - DiNucci lost two fumbles, both of which led to Eagles touchdowns, including a controversial 53-yard return by Eagles safety Rodney McLeod. Further, the Cowboys were held without a touchdown for the second consecutive week, only being able to muster three Greg Zuerlein field goals. DiNucci finished with 180 yards passing and a rating of 64.6 in the 23–9 loss, and Dallas fell to 2–6 on the season and third place in the NFC East. This marked the first time that the Cowboys lost multiple division games in one season since the 2016 season, when all three of their regular season losses came within the division.

==== Week 9: vs. Pittsburgh Steelers ====
Week Nine: Pittsburgh Steelers at Dallas Cowboys – Game summary

Quarter	1	2	3	4	Total
**Steelers**	0	9	0	15	**24**
Cowboys	3	10	6	0	**19**

at AT&T Stadium, Arlington, Texas

- Date: November 8
- Game time: 3:25 p.m. CST
- Game weather: Cloudy, 70 °F (21 °C) (retractable roof open)
- Game attendance: 31,700
- Referee: Tony Corrente
- TV announcers (CBS): Jim Nantz, Tony Romo, Tracy Wolfson and Gene Steratore
- Recap, Game Book

Game information

**First quarter**

- DAL – Greg Zuerlein 38-yard field goal, 3:55. Cowboys 3–0. **Drive: 12 plays, 65 yards, 6:47.**

**Second quarter**

- DAL – CeeDee Lamb 20-yard pass from Garrett Gilbert (Greg Zuerlein kick), 7:45. Cowboys 10–0. **Drive: 8 plays, 65 yards, 3:41.**
- DAL – Greg Zuerlein 44-yard field goal, 3:46. Cowboys 13–0. **Drive: 4 plays, 5 yards, 2:15.**
- PIT – James Washington 17-yard pass from Ben Roethlisberger (kick failed), 1:10. Cowboys 13–6. **Drive: 9 plays, 75 yards, 2:36.**
- PIT – Chris Boswell 59-yard field goal, 0:00. Cowboys 13–9. **Drive: 4 plays, −2 yards, 0:52.**

**Third quarter**

- DAL – Greg Zuerlein 45-yard field goal, 10:17. Cowboys 16–9. **Drive: 11 plays, 50 yards, 4:43.**
- DAL – Greg Zuerlein 39-yard field goal, 2:13. Cowboys 19–9. **Drive: 12 plays, 53 yards, 6:26.**

**Fourth Quarter**

- PIT – JuJu Smith-Schuster 31-yard pass from Ben Roethlisberger (kick blocked), 14:51. Cowboys 19–15. **Drive: 6 plays, 75 yards, 2:22.**
- PIT – Chris Boswell 43-yard field goal, 7:11. Cowboys 19–18. **Drive: 11 plays, 75 yards, 4:34.**
- PIT – Eric Ebron 8-yard pass from Ben Roethlisberger (pass failed), 2:14. Steelers 24–19. **Drive: 6 plays, 79 yards, 1:57.**

**Top passers**

- PIT – Ben Roethlisberger – 29/42, 306 yards, 3 TD
- DAL – Garrett Gilbert – 21/38, 243 yards, TD, INT

**Top rushers**

- PIT – James Conner – 9 rushes, 22 yards
- DAL – Tony Pollard – 9 rushes, 57 yards

**Top receivers**

- PIT – JuJu Smith-Schuster – 6 receptions, 93 yards, TD
- DAL – CeeDee Lamb – 4 receptions, 71 yards, TD

The Cowboys entered the game as 14-point underdogs. It would only be the second time in Cowboys history that they would be double digit underdogs at home. The Cowboys would lead at halftime, but the Steelers would pull away and win the game. The Cowboys dropped to 2–7, and suffered their first four-game losing streak since 2015, when the Cowboys had the same such start. This loss also ensures the Cowboys got pushed to the brink of a non-winning season for back-to-back years. This was the first time the Cowboys would do so since they did in 2010–2013.

==== Week 11: at Minnesota Vikings ====
Week Eleven: Dallas Cowboys at Minnesota Vikings – Game summary

Quarter	1	2	3	4	Total
**Cowboys**	6	10	0	15	**31**
Vikings	7	0	7	14	**28**

at U.S. Bank Stadium, Minneapolis, Minnesota

- Date: November 22
- Game time: 3:25 p.m. CST
- Game weather: None (indoor stadium)
- Game attendance: 0
- Referee: Bill Vinovich
- TV announcers (Fox): Kenny Albert, Jonathan Vilma and Shannon Spake
- Recap, Game Book

Game information

**First quarter**

- DAL – Ezekiel Elliott 6-yard pass from Andy Dalton (kick blocked), 9:26. Cowboys 6–0. **Drive: 3 plays, 30 yards, 1:31.**
- MIN – Dalvin Cook 1-yard run (Dan Bailey kick), 2:11. Vikings 7–6. **Drive: 12 plays, 75 yards, 7:15.**

**Second quarter**

- DAL – CeeDee Lamb 4-yard pass from Andy Dalton (Greg Zuerlein kick), 4:55. Cowboys 13–7. **Drive: 9 plays, 52 yards, 5:01.**
- DAL – Greg Zuerlein 19-yard field goal, 0:02. Cowboys 16–7. **Drive: 5 plays, 47 yards, 0:47.**

**Third quarter**

- MIN – Adam Thielen 2-yard pass from Kirk Cousins (Dan Bailey kick), 9:50. Cowboys 16–14. **Drive: 9 plays, 75 yards, 5:10.**

**Fourth quarter**

- MIN – Adam Thielen 3-yard pass from Kirk Cousins (Dan Bailey kick), 14:57. Vikings 21–16. **Drive: 12 plays, 81 yards, 6:47.**
- DAL – Tony Pollard 42-yard run (CeeDee Lamb run), 12:02. Cowboys 24–21. **Drive: 5 plays, 75 yards, 2:55.**
- MIN – Justin Jefferson 39-yard pass from Kirk Cousins (Dan Bailey kick), 9:37. Vikings 28–24. **Drive: 5 plays, 75 yards, 2:25.**
- DAL – Dalton Schultz 2-yard pass from Andy Dalton (Greg Zuerlein kick), 1:37. Cowboys 31–28. **Drive: 11 plays, 61 yards, 2:23.**

**Top passers**

- DAL – Andy Dalton – 22/32, 203 yards, 3 TD, INT
- MIN – Kirk Cousins – 22/30, 314 yards, 3 TD

**Top rushers**

- DAL – Ezekiel Elliott – 21 rushes, 103 yards
- MIN – Dalvin Cook – 27 rushes, 115 yards, TD

**Top receivers**

- DAL – Amari Cooper – 6 receptions, 81 yards
- MIN – Adam Thielen – 8 receptions, 123 yards, 2 TD

The Cowboys were 7-point underdogs entering the game. Despite this, the Cowboys snapped their 4-game losing streak and improved to 1–4 without Dak Prescott. The game would be sealed after forcing a turnover on downs and then running out the game clock. The game's biggest highlight was a CeeDee Lamb catch for a touchdown. This win improved the Cowboys to 3–7 on the season.

==== Week 12: vs. Washington Football Team ====
Thanksgiving Day games

Week Twelve: Washington Football Team at Dallas Cowboys – Game summary

Quarter	1	2	3	4	Total
**Washington**	7	10	3	21	**41**
Cowboys	3	10	3	0	**16**

at AT&T Stadium, Arlington, Texas

- Date: November 26
- Game time: 3:30 p.m. CST
- Game weather: Sunny, 73 °F (23 °C) (retractable roof open)
- Game attendance: 30,048
- Referee: Clay Martin
- TV announcers (Fox): Joe Buck, Troy Aikman, Erin Andrews and Kristina Pink
- Recap, Game Book

Game information

**First quarter**

- DAL – Greg Zuerlein 33-yard field goal, 8:30. Cowboys 3–0. **Drive: 11 plays, 57 yards, 4:38.**
- WAS – Antonio Gibson 5-yard run (Dustin Hopkins kick), 1:37. Football Team 7–3. **Drive: 12 plays, 75 yards, 6:53.**

**Second quarter**

- DAL – Amari Cooper 54-yard pass from Andy Dalton (Greg Zuerlein kick), 14:08. Cowboys 10–7. **Drive: 5 plays, 75 yards, 2:29**
- WAS – Dustin Hopkins 23-yard field goal, 7:13. Tied 10–10. **Drive: 14 plays, 67 yards, 6:55**
- WAS – Logan Thomas 5-yard pass from Alex Smith (Dustin Hopkins kick), 2:26. Football Team 17–10. **Drive: 5 plays, 19 yards, 2:51.**
- DAL – Greg Zuerlein 32-yard field goal, 0:19. Football Team 17–13. **Drive: 10 plays, 61 yards, 2:07.**

**Third quarter**

- WAS – Dustin Hopkins 36-yard field goal, 10:48. Football Team 20–13. **Drive: 6 plays, 15 yards, 3:29.**
- DAL – Greg Zuerlein 28-yard field goal, 2:32. Football Team 20–16. **Drive: 4 plays, 6 yards, 1:38.**

**Fourth quarter**

- WAS – Antonio Gibson 23-yard run (Dustin Hopkins kick), 12:07. Football Team 27–16. **Drive: 1 play, 23 yards, 0:06.**
- WAS – Antonio Gibson 37-yard run (Dustin Hopkins kick), 3:31. Football Team 34–16. **Drive: 10 plays, 76 yards, 5:50.**
- WAS – Montez Sweat 15-yard interception return (Dustin Hopkins kick), 3:24. Football Team 41–16.

**Top passers**

- WAS – Alex Smith – 19/26, 149 yards, TD, INT
- DAL – Andy Dalton – 25/35, 215 yards, TD, INT

**Top rushers**

- WAS – Antonio Gibson – 20 rushes, 115 yards, 3 TDs
- DAL – Ezekiel Elliott – 10 rushes, 32 yards

**Top receivers**

- WAS – Terry McLaurin – 7 receptions, 92 yards
- DAL – Amari Cooper – 6 receptions, 112 yards, TD

The Cowboys returned home hoping to avoid being swept by the Washington Football Team. A controversial fake punt attempt caused the Cowboys, who were already trailing, to trail further. The Cowboys would never score again, as the Cowboys dropped to 3–8 and were swept by Washington for the first time since 2012. This loss also ensures the Cowboys could no longer improve on their 8–8 season from the previous season.

==== Week 13: at Baltimore Ravens ====
Week Thirteen: Dallas Cowboys at Baltimore Ravens – Game summary

Quarter	1	2	3	4	Total
Cowboys	3	7	0	7	**17**
**Ravens**	7	10	7	10	**34**

at M&T Bank Stadium, Baltimore, Maryland

- Date: December 8
- Game time: 8:05 p.m. EST/7:05 p.m. CST
- Game weather: Clear, 38 °F (3 °C)
- Game attendance: 0
- Referee: Brad Allen
- TV announcers (Fox/NFLN/Amazon Prime Video): Joe Buck, Troy Aikman, Erin Andrews and Kristina Pink
- Recap, Game Book

Game information

**First quarter**

- DAL – Greg Zuerlein 31-yard field goal, 4:21. Cowboys 3–0 . **Drive: 6 plays, 21 yards, 2:42.**
- BAL – Lamar Jackson 37-yard run (Justin Tucker kick), 0:25. Ravens 7–3. **Drive: 7 plays, 75 yards, 3:56.**

**Second quarter**

- DAL – Michael Gallup 13-yard pass from Andy Dalton (Greg Zuerlein kick), 14:19. Cowboys 10–7. **Drive: 3 plays, 28 yards, 1:06.**
- BAL – Miles Boykin 38-yard pass from Lamar Jackson (Justin Tucker kick), 8:08. Ravens 14–10. **Drive: 1 plays, 38 yards, 0:07.**
- BAL – Justin Tucker 35-yard field goal, 0:46. Ravens 17–10 . **Drive: 6 plays, 53 yards, 1:16.**

**Third quarter**

- BAL – Marquise Brown 20-yard pass from Lamar Jackson (Justin Tucker kick), 4:40. Ravens 24–10. **Drive: 9 plays, 57 yards, 4:27.**

**Fourth quarter**

- BAL – Justin Tucker 22-yard field goal, 8:15. Ravens 27–10 . **Drive: 11 plays, 54 yards, 5:59.**
- DAL – Amari Cooper 2-yard pass from Andy Dalton (Greg Zuerlein kick), 3:49. Ravens 27–17. **Drive: 12 plays, 75 yards, 4:16.**
- BAL – J. K. Dobbins 5-yard run (Justin Tucker kick), 2:08. Ravens 34–17. **Drive: 6 plays, 44 yards, 1:51.**

**Top passers**

- DAL – Andy Dalton – 31/48, 285 yards, 2 TD, INT
- BAL – Lamar Jackson – 12/17, 107 yards, 2 TD, INT

**Top rushers**

- DAL – Ezekiel Elliott – 18 rushes, 77 yards
- BAL – Gus Edwards – 7 rushes, 101 yards

**Top receivers**

- DAL – Michael Gallup – 7 receptions, 86 yards
- BAL – Marquise Brown – 5 receptions, 39 yards, TD

The depleted Cowboys traveled to Baltimore to take on the Ravens, in search of the franchise's first win there. The game was originally scheduled to be played on December 3, 2020. Due to a COVID-19 outbreak among the Ravens organization, the game was moved to December 8. The Cowboys continued to struggle, and dropped to 3–9 and were guaranteed their first losing season since 2015. The Cowboys lost 6 of the last 7 games without Dak Prescott. The Cowboys have not won in Baltimore since 1981 when they beat the Baltimore Colts at Memorial Stadium 37–13.

==== Week 14: at Cincinnati Bengals ====
Week Fourteen: Dallas Cowboys at Cincinnati Bengals – Game summary

Quarter	1	2	3	4	Total
**Cowboys**	10	7	3	10	**30**
Bengals	0	7	0	0	**7**

at Paul Brown Stadium, Cincinnati, Ohio

- Date: December 13
- Game time: 1:00 p.m. EST/12:00 p.m. CST
- Game weather: Cloudy, 44 °F (7 °C)
- Game attendance: 10,322
- Referee: John Hussey
- TV announcers (Fox): Kevin Kugler, Chris Spielman and Laura Okmin
- Recap, Game Book

Game information

**First quarter**

- DAL – Greg Zuerlein 34-yard field goal, 11:02. Cowboys 3–0. **Drive: 7 plays, 16 yards, 3:20.**
- DAL – Aldon Smith 78-yard fumble return (Greg Zuerlein kick), 6:15. Cowboys 10–0.

**Second quarter**

- DAL – Amari Cooper 11-yard pass from Andy Dalton (Greg Zuerlein kick), 6:38. Cowboys 17–0. **Drive: 15 plays, 88 yards, 8:12.**
- CIN – A. J. Green 5-yard pass from Brandon Allen (Austin Seibert kick), 0:08. Cowboys 17–7. **Drive: 16 plays, 77 yards, 6:30.**

**Third quarter**

- DAL – Greg Zuerlein 20-yard field goal, 11:35. Cowboys 20–7. **Drive: 8 plays, 41 yards, 3:25.**

**Fourth quarter**

- DAL – Greg Zuerlein 55-yard field goal, 5:12. Cowboys 23–7. **Drive: 7 plays, 53 yards, 2:11.**
- DAL – Tony Pollard 7-yard pass from Andy Dalton (Greg Zuerlein kick), 1:55. Cowboys 30–7. **Drive: 4 plays, 16 yards, 1:42.**

**Top passers**

- DAL – Andy Dalton – 16/23, 185 yards, 2 TD
- CIN – Brandon Allen – 27/36, 217 yards, TD

**Top rushers**

- DAL – Ezekiel Elliott – 12 rushes, 48 yards
- CIN – Trayveon Williams – 12 rushes, 49 yards

**Top receivers**

- DAL – Amari Cooper – 4 receptions, 51 yards, TD
- CIN – A. J. Green – 6 receptions, 62 yards, TD

Andy Dalton made his first return to Cincinnati since getting released by the Bengals during the 2020 offseason. The Cowboys improved to 4–9 with the blowout win. This win keeps the Cowboys in the race for an NFC East title, aided by the fact that all NFC East teams had losing records.

==== Week 15: vs. San Francisco 49ers ====
Week Fifteen: San Francisco 49ers at Dallas Cowboys – Game summary

Quarter	1	2	3	4	Total
49ers	7	7	10	9	**33**
**Cowboys**	14	3	7	17	**41**

at AT&T Stadium, Arlington, Texas

- Date: December 20
- Game time: 12:00 p.m. CST
- Game weather: 57 °F (14 °C) (retractable roof open)
- Game attendance: 30,092
- Referee: Land Clark
- TV announcers (CBS): Kevin Harlan, Trent Green and Melanie Collins
- Recap, Game Book

Game information

**First quarter**

- DAL – Tony Pollard 1-yard run (Greg Zuerlein kick), 9:34. Cowboys 7–0. **Drive: 5 plays, 22 yards, 2:24.**
- DAL – Michael Gallup 3-yard pass from Andy Dalton (Greg Zuerlein kick), 6:39. Cowboys 14–0. **Drive: 5 plays, 24 yards, 2:22.**
- SF – Jordan Reed 5-yard pass from Nick Mullens (Robbie Gould kick), 0:12. Cowboys 14–7. **Drive: 13 plays, 75 yards, 6:27.**

**Second quarter**

- DAL – Greg Zuerlein 48-yard field goal, 11:37. Cowboys 17–7. **Drive: 8 plays, 37 yards, 3:35.**
- SF – Brandon Aiyuk 2-yard pass from Nick Mullens (Robbie Gould kick), 5:00. Cowboys 17–14. **Drive: 13 plays, 75 yards, 6:37.**

**Third quarter**

- SF – Robbie Gould 41-yard field goal, 10:48. Tied 17–17. **Drive: 6 plays, 48 yards, 2:41.**
- DAL – Dalton Schultz 12-yard pass from Andy Dalton (Greg Zuerlein kick), 7:35. Cowboys 24–17. **Drive: 6 plays, 73 yards, 3:13.**
- SF – Jeff Wilson 1-yard run (Robbie Gould kick), 2:08. Tied 24–24. **Drive: 11 plays, 75 yards, 5:27.**

**Fourth quarter**

- DAL – Greg Zuerlein 46-yard field goal, 10:08. Cowboys 27–24. **Drive: 4 plays, 0 yards, 0:18.**
- DAL – Tony Pollard 40-yard run (Greg Zuerlein kick), 2:27. Cowboys 34–24. **Drive: 2 plays, 46 yards, 0:16.**
- SF – Robbie Gould 31-yard field goal, 0:40. Cowboys 34–27. **Drive: 10 plays, 62 yards, 1:47.**
- DAL – CeeDee Lamb 47-yard kick return (Greg Zuerlein kick), 0:34. Cowboys 41–27.
- SF – Kendrick Bourne 49-yard pass from C. J. Beathard, 0:00. Cowboys 41–33. **Drive: 3 plays, 75 yards, 0:34.**

**Top passers**

- SF – Nick Mullens – 21/36, 219 yards, 2 TD, 2 INT
- DAL – Andy Dalton – 19/33, 209 yards, 2 TD

**Top rushers**

- SF – Raheem Mostert – 14 rushes, 68 yards
- DAL – Tony Pollard – 12 rushes, 69 yards, 2 TD

**Top receivers**

- SF – Kendrick Bourne – 4 receptions, 86 yards, TD
- DAL – CeeDee Lamb – 5 receptions, 85 yards

The Cowboys returned home without injured Ezekiel Elliott, to play against the 49ers, another team dealing with injury issues throughout the season. The Cowboys jumped out to a 14–0 lead early, by touchdown plays by Tony Pollard and wide receiver Michael Gallup. Like it has been all season long, the Cowboys defense struggled all game long. Despite the weak defensive performance, the Cowboys defense took the ball away four times, tied the most takeaways by the Cowboys in the 2020 season. CeeDee Lamb returned a kickoff for a 47-yard touchdown, making the score 41–27. With the game already won, the Cowboys gave up a touchdown on the last play of the game, ending the game with the final score of 41–33. The win, with assistance from a loss by the Washington Football Team improved the Cowboys to 5–9 and kept the Cowboys' season alive, as well as eliminating San Francisco from playoff contention. As of 2025, this remains the Cowboys last win over the 49ers.

==== Week 16: vs. Philadelphia Eagles ====
Week Sixteen: Philadelphia Eagles at Dallas Cowboys – Game summary

Quarter	1	2	3	4	Total
Eagles	14	3	0	0	**17**
**Cowboys**	3	17	10	7	**37**

at AT&T Stadium, Arlington, Texas

- Date: December 27
- Game time: 3:25 p.m. CST
- Game weather: 73 °F (23 °C) (retractable roof open)
- Game attendance: 30,131
- Referee: Adrian Hill
- TV announcers (Fox): Kenny Albert, Jonathan Vilma and Shannon Spake
- Recap, Game Book

Game information

**First quarter**

- PHI – Miles Sanders 4-yard run (Jake Elliott kick), 9:00. Eagles 7–0. **Drive: 11 plays, 75 yards, 6:00.**
- DAL – Greg Zuerlein 35-yard field goal, 6:08. Eagles 7–3. **Drive: 6 plays, 58 yards, 2:52.**
- PHI – DeSean Jackson 81-yard pass from Jalen Hurts (Jake Elliott kick), 5:48. Eagles 14–3. **Drive: 1 play, 81 yards, 0:20.**

**Second quarter**

- DAL – Michael Gallup 21-yard pass from Andy Dalton (Greg Zuerlein kick), 13:09. Eagles 14–10. **Drive: 10 plays, 63 yards, 4:15.**
- DAL – Greg Zuerlein 20-yard field goal, 5:53. Eagles 14–13. **Drive: 7 plays, 75 yards, 3:23.**
- PHI – Jake Elliott 38-yard field goal, 2:09. Eagles 17–13. **Drive: 10 plays, 55 yards, 3:44.**
- DAL – Michael Gallup 7-yard pass from Andy Dalton (Greg Zuerlein kick), 0:12. Cowboys 20–17. **Drive: 11 plays, 75 yards, 1:57.**

**Third quarter**

- DAL – CeeDee Lamb 52-yard pass from Andy Dalton (Greg Zuerlein kick), 12:26. Cowboys 27–17. **Drive: 5 plays, 75 yards, 2:34.**
- DAL – Greg Zuerlein 21-yard field goal, 8:31. Cowboys 30–17. **Drive: 6 plays, 80 yards, 2:22.**

**Fourth quarter**

- DAL – CeeDee Lamb 19-yard run (Greg Zuerlein kick), 1:53. Cowboys 37–17. **Drive: 5 plays, 87 yards, 2:01.**

**Top passers**

- PHI – Jalen Hurts – 21/39, 342 yards, TD, 2 INT
- DAL – Andy Dalton – 22/30, 377 yards, 3 TD, INT

**Top rushers**

- PHI – Jalen Hurts – 9 rushes, 69 yards
- DAL – Ezekiel Elliott – 19 rushes, 105 yards

**Top receivers**

- PHI – Quez Watkins – 2 receptions, 57 yards
- DAL – Michael Gallup – 6 receptions, 121 yards, 2 TD

After falling behind 14–3 after one quarter, the Cowboys outscored the visiting Eagles 34–3 over the final three quarters. The 37–17 win improved Dallas to 6–9 on the season and eliminated Philadelphia from playoff contention. The Cowboys' own playoff hopes were also kept alive thanks to the Washington Football Team's 20–13 loss to the Carolina Panthers. This win was Dallas' 40th home win and 70th overall win against Philadelphia in their rivalry.

==== Week 17: at New York Giants ====
Week Seventeen: Dallas Cowboys at New York Giants – Game summary

Quarter	1	2	3	4	Total
Cowboys	3	6	7	3	**19**
**Giants**	6	14	0	3	**23**

at MetLife Stadium, East Rutherford, New Jersey

- Date: January 3, 2021
- Game time: 1:00 p.m. EST/12:00 p.m. CST
- Game weather: Overcast, 33 °F (1 °C)
- Game attendance: 0
- Referee: Brad Allen
- TV announcers (Fox): Joe Buck, Troy Aikman and Erin Andrews
- Recap, Game Book

Game information

**First quarter**

- NYG – Sterling Shepard 23-yard run (kick failed, wl), 11:46. Giants 6–0. **Drive: 6 plays, 78 yards, 3:14.**
- DAL – Greg Zuerlein 38-yard field goal, 5:03. Giants 6–3. **Drive: 6 plays, 7 yards, 2:07.**

**Second quarter**

- NYG – Sterling Shepard 10-yard pass from Daniel Jones (Graham Gano kick), 6:42. Giants 13–3. **Drive: 6 plays, 65 yards, 3:06.**
- DAL – Greg Zuerlein 46-yard field goal, 2:13. Giants 13–6. **Drive: 10 plays, 44 yards, 4:29.**
- NYG – Dante Pettis 33-yard pass from Daniel Jones (Graham Gano kick), 0:45. Giants 20–6. **Drive: 4 plays, 75 yards, 1:28.**
- DAL – Greg Zuerlein 57-yard field goal, 0:00. Giants 20–9. **Drive: 6 plays, 35 yards, 0:45.**

**Third quarter**

- DAL – Ezekiel Elliott 1-yard run (Greg Zuerlein kick), 8:39. Giants 20–16. **Drive: 10 plays, 62 yards, 4:34.**

**Fourth quarter**

- DAL – Greg Zuerlein 36-yard field goal, 14:16. Giants 20–19. **Drive: 13 plays, 62 yards, 5:14.**
- NYG – Graham Gano 50-yard field goal, 6:27. Giants 23–19. **Drive: 8 plays, 48 yards, 4:10.**

**Top passers**

- DAL – Andy Dalton – 29/47, 243 yards, INT
- NYG – Daniel Jones – 17/25, 229 yards, 2 TD

**Top rushers**

- DAL – Andy Dalton – 7 rushes, 48 yards
- NYG – Wayne Gallman – 11 rushes, 65 yards

**Top receivers**

- DAL – Dalton Schultz – 7 receptions, 70 yards
- NYG – Sterling Shepard – 8 receptions, 112 yards, TD

Despite a second-half comeback, a decision to not attempt a two-point conversion on their third quarter touchdown came back to haunt them, since, trailing by 4 points instead of 3 within 10 yards of the end zone and having to get a touchdown rather than a field goal, their touchdown pass was intercepted and the Cowboys lost to the Giants for the first time since 2016, ending a seven-game winning streak against them. With the loss (though even if Dallas had won, the Washington win hours later would have still eliminated them), Dallas finished 6–10 and missed the playoffs in back-to-back seasons for the first time since the 2010–13 seasons. This was also the first time since 2015 that the Cowboys lost 10 or more games in a season. With this loss, the Cowboys went 4–7 without Dak Prescott. This would be the Cowboys last loss to the Giants until 2025 and the last time they missed the playoffs until 2024.

=== Standings ===
==== Division ====
NFC East
	W	L	T	PCT	DIV	CONF	PF	PA	STK
^{(4)} Washington Football Team	7	9	0	.438	4–2	5–7	335	329	W1
New York Giants	6	10	0	.375	4–2	5–7	280	357	W1
Dallas Cowboys	6	10	0	.375	2–4	5–7	395	473	L1
Philadelphia Eagles	4	11	1	.281	2–4	4–8	334	418	L3

==== Conference ====
NFC
#	Team	Division	W	L	T	PCT	DIV	CONF	SOS	SOV	STK
**Division leaders**
1	Green Bay Packers	North	13	3	0	.813	5–1	10–2	.428	.387	W6
2 (Note: New Orleans finished ahead of Seattle based on conference record.)	New Orleans Saints	South	12	4	0	.750	6–0	10–2	.459	.406	W2
3	Seattle Seahawks	West	12	4	0	.750	4–2	9–3	.447	.404	W4
4	Washington Football Team	East	7	9	0	.438	4–2	5–7	.459	.388	W1
**Wild cards**
5	Tampa Bay Buccaneers	South	11	5	0	.688	4–2	8–4	.488	.392	W4
6	Los Angeles Rams	West	10	6	0	.625	3–3	9–3	.494	.484	W1
7 (Note: Chicago finished and clinched the 7th and final playoff spot ahead of Arizona based on better win percentage in common games (against Detroit, the NY Giants, Carolina, and the LA Rams, Chicago finished 3–2, while Arizona finished 1–4).)	Chicago Bears	North	8	8	0	.500	2–4	6–6	.488	.336	L1
**Did not qualify for the postseason**
8	Arizona Cardinals	West	8	8	0	.500	2–4	6–6	.475	.441	L2
9	Minnesota Vikings	North	7	9	0	.438	4–2	5–7	.504	.366	W1
10 (Note: San Francisco finished ahead of the NY Giants based on head-to-head victory. Division tie break was initially used to eliminate Dallas (see below).)	San Francisco 49ers	West	6	10	0	.375	3–3	4–8	.549	.448	L1
11 (Note: NY Giants won tiebreaker over Dallas based on division record.)	New York Giants	East	6	10	0	.375	4–2	5–7	.502	.427	W1
12	Dallas Cowboys	East	6	10	0	.375	2–4	5–7	.471	.333	L1
13 (Note: Carolina finished ahead of Detroit based on head-to-head victory.)	Carolina Panthers	South	5	11	0	.313	1–5	4–8	.531	.388	L1
14	Detroit Lions	North	5	11	0	.313	1–5	4–8	.508	.350	L4
15	Philadelphia Eagles	East	4	11	1	.281	2–4	4–8	.537	.469	L3
16	Atlanta Falcons	South	4	12	0	.250	1–5	2–10	.551	.391	L5
**Tiebreakers** (Note: When breaking ties for three or more teams under the NFL's rules, they are first broken within divisions, then comparing only the highest-ranked remaining team from each division.)
