= Chris Westry =

American football player (born 1997)

Profile
- Position: Cornerback

Personal information
- Born: July 10, 1997 (age 29); Orange Park, Florida, U.S.
- Listed height: 6 ft 4 in (1.93 m)
- Listed weight: 197 lb (89 kg)

Career information
- High school: Oakleaf (FL)
- College: Kentucky
- NFL draft: 2019: undrafted

Career history
- Dallas Cowboys (2019–2020); Baltimore Ravens (2021); Carolina Panthers (2022)*; Cleveland Browns (2023)*
- * Offseason or practice squad member only

Career NFL statistics
- Total tackles: 18
- Pass deflections: 3
- Stats at Pro Football Reference

Chris Westry (born July 10, 1997) is an American football cornerback. He played college football at the University of Kentucky.

== Early life ==
Westry attended Oakleaf High School. As a senior, he had 34 tackles, one interception, 12 passes defended and two blocked kicked field goal attempts.

== College career ==
Westry accepted a football scholarship from the University of Kentucky. As a true freshman, he started all 12 games at cornerback. He tallied 36 tackles (1.5 for a loss), 2 interceptions, 8 passes defensed (led the team), one sack and one quarterback hurry. He received All-SEC freshman honors.

As a sophomore, he appeared in all 13 games as a backup at cornerback, making one interception and 2 passes defensed. He had 7 tackles against Mississippi State University.

As a junior, he appeared in all 13 games with 8 starts, recording 34 tackles and 2 passes defensed. He had 5 tackles against Mississippi State University and the University of Louisville.

As a senior, he appeared in all 13 games, posting 21 tackles, one sack and 2 passes defensed. He made 5 tackles against the University of Georgia.

He finished his college career, after playing in all 51 games with 34 starts, while registering 134 tackles (3.5 for loss), 3 interceptions, 2 sacks, 15 passes defensed, one forced fumble and one fumble recovery.

== Professional career ==
=== Dallas Cowboys ===
Westry was signed as an undrafted free agent by the Dallas Cowboys after the 2019 NFL draft on May 10, 2019. On August 31, 2019, he was placed on the injured reserve list with a hamstring injury.

Westry was waived during final roster cuts on September 5, 2020, and signed to the practice squad the next day. He was elevated to the active roster on December 12, 2020 and December 19, 2020 for the team's weeks 14 and 15 games against the Cincinnati Bengals and San Francisco 49ers, and reverted to the practice squad after each game. He suffered a PCL sprain against the 49ers, and he was placed on the practice squad/injured list on December 26, 2020. His practice squad contract with the team expired after the season on January 11, 2021.

=== Baltimore Ravens ===
On January 18, 2021, Westry signed a futures contract with the Baltimore Ravens. On September 17, 2021, Westry was placed on injured reserve with a torn lateral meniscus. On November 11, 2021, Westry was activated from injured reserve. He appeared in 6 games with 2 starts, registering 17 tackles and three passes defensed.

=== Carolina Panthers ===
On April 4, 2022, Westry signed with the Carolina Panthers. He was waived on August 14, 2022.

=== Cleveland Browns ===
On May 16, 2023, Westry signed with the Cleveland Browns. He was waived on August 23, 2023.

=== NFL career statistics ===
Legend
	Led the league
**Bold**	Career high

Year	Team	GP	GS	Tackles				Interceptions					Fumbles	
Year	Team	GP	GS	Comb	Total	Ast	Sack	PD	Int	Yds	Avg	TDs	FF	FR
2020	DAL	2	2	1	1	0	0.0	0	0	0	0.0	0	0	0
2021	BAL	6	2	8	12	0	0.0	3	0	0	0.0	0	0	0
Total		6	6	9	13	0	0.0	3	0	0	0.0	0	0	0
Source: NFL.com
