= List of Dallas Cowboys head coaches =

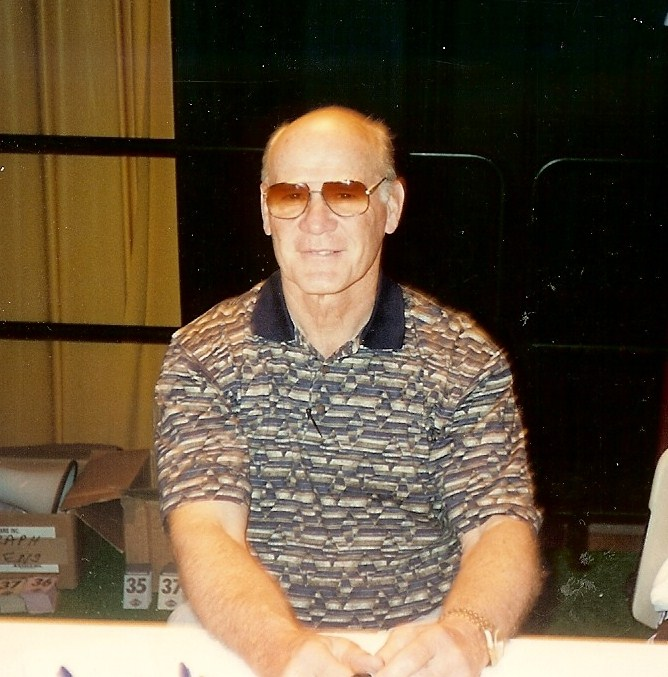
Tom Landry was the first head coach of the Cowboys, and coached the team from 1960 to 1988. He was inducted into the Pro Football Hall of Fame in 1990.

The Dallas Cowboys are a professional American football team based in Frisco, Texas. Their stadium is located in Arlington, Texas. They are members of the Eastern Division of the National Football Conference (NFC) in the National Football League (NFL). The Cowboys franchise was founded in 1960 as an expansion team. The team played their games in the Cotton Bowl from 1960 to 1970, then in Texas Stadium from 1971 to 2008, and AT&T Stadium from 2009 to present. There have been ten head coaches for the Dallas Cowboys. Three coaches have won Super Bowls with the team: Tom Landry in Super Bowl VI and XII, Jimmy Johnson in Super Bowl XXVII and XXVIII, and Barry Switzer in Super Bowl XXX. Landry is the team's all-time leader in games coached and wins, and Switzer leads all coaches in regular season winning percentage with .625. Dave Campo is the only Cowboys coach with a losing record (.313), and is also the only coach in franchise history to have never posted a winning season. The team's first coach, Tom Landry, has been inducted into the Pro Football Hall of Fame. The current coach is Brian Schottenheimer, who replaced Mike McCarthy on January 24, 2025, after the latter's contract expired on January 13.

== Key ==
#	Number of coaches (Note: A running total of the number of coaches of the Cowboys. Thus, any coach who has two or more terms as head coach is only counted once.)
Yrs	Years coached
First	First season coached
Last	Last season coached
GC	Games Coached
W	Wins
L	Losses
T	Ties
W%	Win – Loss percentage
*†	Elected into the Pro Football Hall of Fame as a coach and spent entire NFL head coaching career with the Cowboys
†	Elected into the Pro Football Hall of Fame as a coach
*	Spent entire NFL head coaching career with the Cowboys

== Coaches ==
Note: Statistics are accurate through the end of the 2025 NFL season.

#	Image	Name	Term (Note: Each year is linked to an article about that particular NFL season.)			Regular season					Playoffs				Accomplishments	Ref.
#	Image	Name	Yrs	First	Last	GC	W	L	T	W%	GC	W	L	W%	Accomplishments	Ref.
1		Tom Landry*^{†}	29	1960	1988	418	250	162	6	.605	36	20	16	.556	Inducted Pro Football Hall of Fame (1990); 2 Super Bowl Championships (VI, XII); 2 Eastern Conference Championships (1966, 1967); 5 NFC Championships (1970, 1971, 1975, 1977, 1978); 12 NFC East Championships (1967, 1968, 1969, 1970, 1971, 1973, 1976, 1977, 1978, 1979, 1981, 1985); 18 Playoff Berths; 1 AP Coach of the Year Award (1966); 1 Sporting News Coach of the Year Award (1966); 1 UPI NFL Coach of the Year Award (1966); 1 UPI NFC Coach of the Year Award (1975)	
2		Jimmy Johnson^{†}	5	1989	1993	80	44	36	0	.550	8	7	1	.875	Inducted Pro Football Hall of Fame (2020); 2 Super Bowl Championships (XXVII, XXVIII); 2 NFC Championships (1992, 1993); 2 NFC East Championships (1992, 1993); 3 Playoff Berths; 1 AP Coach of the Year Award (1990); 1 UPI NFC Coach of the Year Award (1990)	
3		Barry Switzer*	4	1994	1997	64	40	24	0	.625	7	5	2	.714	1 Super Bowl Championship (XXX); 1 NFC Championship (1995); 3 NFC East Championships (1994, 1995, 1996); 3 Playoff Berths	
4		Chan Gailey	2	1998	1999	32	18	14	0	.563	2	0	2	.000	1 NFC East Championship (1998); 2 Playoff Berths	
5		Dave Campo*	3	2000	2002	48	15	33	0	.313	—					
6		Bill Parcells^{†}	4	2003	2006	64	34	30	0	.531	2	0	2	.000	Inducted Pro Football Hall of Fame (2013); 2 Playoff Berths	
7		Wade Phillips	4	2007	2010 (Note: After a 1–7 start Wade Phillips became the first coach in Cowboys history to be fired during the season. He was replaced by offensive coordinator Jason Garrett.)	56	34	22	0	.607	3	1	2	.333	2 NFC East Championships (2007, 2009); 2 Playoff Berths	
8		Jason Garrett*	10	2010	2019	152	85	67	0	.559	5	2	3	.400	3 NFC East Championships (2014, 2016, 2018); 3 Playoff Berths; 1 AP Coach of the Year Award (2016)	
9		Mike McCarthy	5	2020	2024	84	49	35	0	.583	4	1	3	.250	2 NFC East Championships (2021, 2023); 3 Playoff Berths	
10		Brian Schottenheimer*	2	2025	present	21	9	11	1	.429	—					
