= C. J. Goodwin =

American football player (born 1990)

C.J. Goodwin
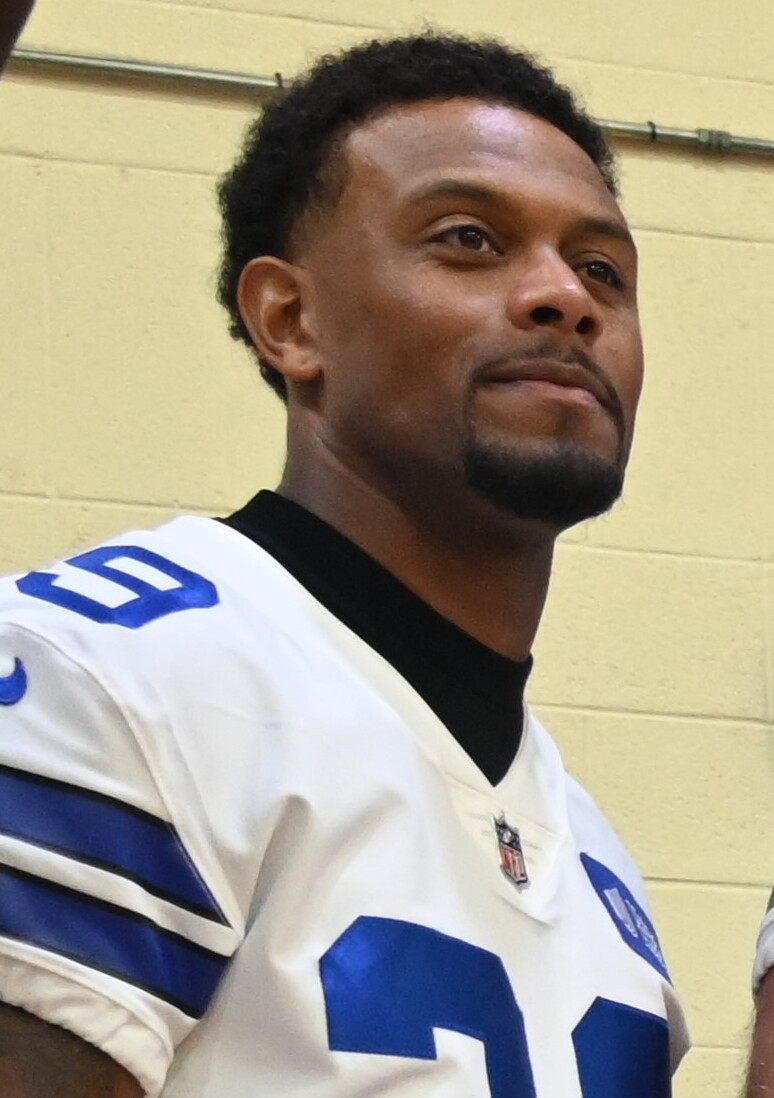
- Goodwin with the Dallas Cowboys in 2024

No. 29, 42
- Position: Cornerback

Personal information
- Born: February 4, 1990 (age 36); Wheeling, West Virginia, U.S.
- Listed height: 6 ft 3 in (1.91 m)
- Listed weight: 190 lb (86 kg)

Career information
- High school: Linsly School (Wheeling)
- College: Bethany (WV) (2010–2011); Fairmont State (2012); California (PA) (2013)
- NFL draft: 2014: undrafted

Career history
- Pittsburgh Steelers (2014–2015)*; Atlanta Falcons (2015–2017); Arizona Cardinals (2017); New York Giants (2018)*; San Francisco 49ers (2018)*; Cincinnati Bengals (2018)*; Dallas Cowboys (2018–2025)
- * Offseason or practice squad member only

Career NFL statistics
- Total tackles: 94
- Forced fumbles: 2
- Fumble recoveries: 1
- Pass deflections: 2
- Stats at Pro Football Reference

Charaun Jareé Goodwin (born February 4, 1990) is an American former professional football player who was a cornerback in the National Football League (NFL). He was signed by the Pittsburgh Steelers as an undrafted free agent following the 2014 NFL draft. He played in 136 games for the Atlanta Falcons, Arizona Cardinals, and Dallas Cowboys from 2016 to 2025. He played college basketball for the Bethany Bison, and college football for the Fairmont State Fighting Falcons and the California Vulcans.

== Early life ==
Goodwin was born on February 4, 1990, in Wheeling, West Virginia, to Yvette Goodwin-Rowe and Perry Galloway Jr. He attended The Linsly School in Wheeling, West Virginia, and did not play football until his senior year. He was a starter at wide receiver. In addition to football, he also competed in track and basketball.

== College career ==
=== Bethany College ===
After graduating from high school, Goodwin attended Bethany College. He played basketball for Bethany for two seasons and transferred after his sophomore year. He did not play football at Bethany.

=== Fairmont State University ===
Following his departure from Bethany, Goodwin would enroll in Fairmont State University for his junior year. After his arrival, he played in an intramural basketball game against the school's football staff. At the urging of his father, the late Perry Galloway Jr., and his college roommate, future NFL player Dewey McDonald he eventually joined the Fighting Falcons football team.

In his first game against Clarion he would make 6 catches for 56 yards. On September 22, Goodwin would amass 3 catches, 104 yards, and make an 83-yard touchdown catch in a game against West Liberty University (during a game against his first cousin Daree' Goodwin). While matching up against West Virginia Wesleyan, he would reel in three receptions, 55 receiving yards, and a career-high two touchdowns. In the next game against Seton Hill, Goodwin would score on a 31-yard reception. On November 10, he made a career-high seven catches for 141 receiving yards in a win against Shepherd.

After walking on his first year and having a successful season he was offered a scholarship to continue playing for Fairmont. Head coach Mike Lopez would be fired after Goodwin's first year playing for Fairmont and accepted a defensive coordinator position with California University of Pennsylvania. Goodwin finished the 2012 season third on the team with 24 receptions and 440 receiving yards. He also led the team with 18.3 yards per a catch and finished the season with 4 touchdown receptions.

=== California University of Pennsylvania ===
After the departure of Fairmont's head coach, Goodwin would transfer to California University of Pennsylvania to continue playing wide receiver for his former head coach Mike Lopez. Since he already graduated from Fairmont, he was able to begin playing immediately, instead of sitting out a year due to NCAA student transfer guidelines.

Goodwin would make his first touchdown reception of the 2013 season against Kutztown. In a game against IUP, he made two receptions for 16 yards. While playing Gannon, he made three receptions for 40 receiving yards. Against Millersville, he ended with a season-high four catches and 49 yards. Since he mainly saw action on special teams, he only finished his senior season at Cal-Pennsylvania with a total of 11 receptions, 126 receiving yards, and one touchdown in 11 games and one start.

== Professional career ==
Pre-draft measurables
Height	Weight	Arm length	Hand span	Wingspan	40-yard dash	10-yard split	20-yard split	20-yard shuttle	Three-cone drill	Vertical jump	Broad jump	Bench press
6 ft 0 3/4 in (1.85 m)	178 lb (81 kg)	31 1/8 in (0.79 m)	9 in (0.23 m)	6 ft 1 1/2 in (1.87 m)	4.41 s	1.52 s	2.45 s	4.51 s	6.97 s	40.0 in (1.02 m)	10 ft 10 in (3.30 m)	15 reps
All values from Pro Day

=== Pittsburgh Steelers ===
After finishing his collegiate career, Goodwin would enter the 2014 NFL draft. He was a virtually unknown prospect due to him playing at two NCAA Division II schools and he was thought to be a raw player, but also had good size and measurables to play wide receiver. Although he wasn't invited to the official NFL Combine held annually in Indianapolis, he still had good showing at a pre-draft combine held by the Detroit Lions.

After going undrafted and not receiving any interest as an undrafted free agent immediately after the draft, Goodwin finally received a tryout with the Pittsburgh Steelers after Mel Blount urged them to give him an opportunity. He had attended the same high school as Blount's son and worked for Blount as a farmhand for seven years. On June 4, 2014, he signed an undrafted rookie free agent contract with the Steelers, for three-years and $1.53 million. He was released on August 26. He was added to the practice squad five days later.

Goodwin signed a reserve/futures contract with Pittsburgh on January 5, 2015. On August 31, Goodwin was waived by the Steelers.

=== Atlanta Falcons ===
On November 3, 2015, Goodwin was signed to the Atlanta Falcons' practice squad.

Goodwin signed a reserve/futures contract with the Atlanta Falcons on January 5, 2016. During the Falcons training camp in 2016, he converted from a wide receiver to a cornerback. In 2016, he played in 14 games with one start, recording 7 defensive tackles, 2 passes defensed and 10 special teams tackles. Goodwin and the Falcons reached Super Bowl LI on February 5, 2017. Against the New England Patriots, the Falcons fell in a 34–28 overtime defeat. He recorded 2 defensive tackles and one special teams tackle in the game.

In 2017, Goodwin played in 12 games, making 5 defensive tackles and 3 special teams tackles, before being waived on December 14, 2017.

=== Arizona Cardinals ===
On December 15, 2017, Goodwin was claimed off waivers by the Arizona Cardinals. He played in the final two games of the season and had one special teams tackle.

On May 1, 2018, Goodwin was released by the Cardinals.

=== New York Giants ===
On May 2, 2018, Goodwin was claimed off waivers by the New York Giants. He was waived by the Giants on May 14.

=== San Francisco 49ers ===
On May 15, 2018, Goodwin was claimed off waivers by the San Francisco 49ers. He was waived by San Francisco on July 31.

=== Cincinnati Bengals ===
On August 4, 2018, Goodwin signed with the Cincinnati Bengals. He was waived on September 1, and was re-signed to the practice squad the next day.

=== Dallas Cowboys ===
On October 9, 2018, Goodwin was signed by the Dallas Cowboys off the Bengals practice squad. He was placed on injured reserve on October 26, after undergoing surgery for a broken forearm. On December 24, he was activated off injured reserve, to play gunner on special teams and improve the coverage units. He played in two games, before being sidelined for 8 contests with a broken arm, returning for the season finale and the playoffs. He finished the season with one special teams tackle.

In 2019, Goodwin appeared in all 16 games for the first time in his career and became an important player on the special teams units. He registered 2 defensive tackles and 10 special teams tackles (led the team). He had 3 special teams tackles against the Chicago Bears.

On March 30, 2020, Goodwin re-signed with the Cowboys. He was released during final roster cuts in a planned roster maneuver on September 5. He was re-signed two days later after the roster moves were completed. In Week 2 against his former team, the Atlanta Falcons, Goodwin recovered an onside kick with less than two minutes left in the game to set up the game winning field goal of the improbable 40–39 comeback win. The play came to be known as the 'watermelon' kick. In Week 16, he had a key role in the 37–17 win against the Philadelphia Eagles, where he was used as a spy defender, to help neutralize the running of rookie quarterback Jalen Hurts.

On March 19, 2021, Goodwin re-signed with the Cowboys on a two-year contract. He appeared in all 17 games, making 10 special teams tackles and becoming the first player in franchise history, to lead the team in that category for three consecutive seasons (since special teams tackles began to be tracked in 1988).

Goodwin was waived during final roster cuts in a planned roster maneuver on August 30, 2022. He was re–signed to the team's practice squad the following day. He appeared in all 17 games and finished second in special teams tackles behind Luke Gifford.

On March 16, 2023, Goodwin re-signed with the Cowboys on a one-year contract. He was released on August 29, and re-signed to the practice squad. He was promoted to the active roster on September 23. He was placed on injured reserve on October 16, with a pectoral injury.

On March 14, 2024, Goodwin re-signed with the Cowboys.

On March 4, 2025, Goodwin re-signed with the Cowboys on a one-year contract. He was released by Dallas during final roster cuts, but was re-signed to the team's active roster on August 27.

=== Retirement ===
Goodwin announced his retirement from professional football on June 28, 2026, after 12 seasons.

== NFL career statistics ==
Legend
**Bold**	Career high

=== Regular season ===
Year	Team	Games		Tackles					Interceptions						Fumbles				
Year	Team	GP	GS	Cmb	Solo	Ast	Sck	TFL	Int	Yds	Avg	Lng	TD	PD	FF	Fum	FR	Yds	TD
2016	ATL	14	1	17	**14**	3	0.0	0	0	0	0.0	0	0	**2**	0	0	0	0	0
2017	ATL	12	0	8	7	1	0.0	0	0	0	0.0	0	0	0	0	0	0	0	0
2017	ARI	2	0	1	1	0	0.0	0	0	0	0.0	0	0	0	0	0	0	0	0
2018	DAL	3	0	1	1	0	0.0	0	0	0	0.0	0	0	0	0	0	0	0	0
2019	DAL	16	0	9	7	2	0.0	0	0	0	0.0	0	0	0	0	0	0	0	0
2020	DAL	16	0	9	6	3	0.0	0	0	0	0.0	0	0	0	0	0	0	0	0
2021	DAL	17	0	10	7	3	0.0	0	0	0	0.0	0	0	0	0	0	0	0	0
2022	DAL	17	0	8	3	5	0.0	0	0	0	0.0	0	0	0	**1**	0	0	0	0
2023	DAL	5	0	4	4	0	0.0	0	0	0	0.0	0	0	0	0	0	0	0	0
2024	DAL	17	0	9	8	1	0.0	0	0	0	0.0	0	0	0	**1**	0	**1**	0	0
2025	DAL	17	0	**18**	10	**8**	0.0	0	0	0	0.0	0	0	0	0	0	0	0	0
Career		136	1	94	68	26	0.0	0	0	0	0.0	0	0	2	2	0	1	0	0

=== Postseason ===
Year	Team	Games		Tackles					Interceptions						Fumbles				
Year	Team	GP	GS	Cmb	Solo	Ast	Sck	TFL	Int	Yds	Avg	Lng	TD	PD	FF	Fum	FR	Yds	TD
2016	ATL	3	0	**5**	**4**	**1**	0.0	0	0	0	0.0	0	0	**1**	0	0	0	0	0
2018	DAL	2	0	1	1	0	0.0	0	0	0	0.0	0	0	0	0	0	0	0	0
2021	DAL	1	0	1	1	0	0.0	0	0	0	0.0	0	0	0	0	0	0	0	0
2022	DAL	2	0	1	0	**1**	0.0	0	0	0	0.0	0	0	0	0	0	0	0	0
Career		8	0	8	6	2	0.0	0	0	0	0.0	0	0	1	0	0	0	0	0

== Philanthropy/Causes ==
Goodwin founded the PeGa Foundation (Perry Galloway Jr. Foundation) to honor his late father/mentor after his passing. The PeGa Foundation is a nonprofit mentoring organization based out of his hometown in Wheeling, West Virginia. Off the field, he spends most of his free time mentoring youth of PeGa and volunteering his time by speaking to schools and youth groups across the country.

== Personal life ==
Goodwin has a daughter.
