= Shaq Quarterman =

American football player (born 1997)

Profile
- Position: Linebacker

Personal information
- Born: October 28, 1997 (age 29); Orange Park, Florida, U.S.
- Listed height: 6 ft 0 in (1.83 m)
- Listed weight: 234 lb (106 kg)

Career information
- High school: Oakleaf (Orange Park)
- College: Miami (FL) (2016–2019)
- NFL draft: 2020: 4th round, 140th overall pick

Career history
- Jacksonville Jaguars (2020–2023); Philadelphia Eagles (2024)*; Los Angeles Chargers (2024); Carolina Panthers (2024)*; Los Angeles Chargers (2024)
- * Offseason or practice squad member only

Awards and highlights
- 2× First-team All-ACC (2018, 2019); Second-team All-ACC (2017)

Career NFL statistics as of 2024
- Total tackles: 60
- Forced fumbles: 1
- Fumble recoveries: 1
- Stats at Pro Football Reference

Shaquille Quarterman (born October 28, 1997) is an American professional football linebacker. He played college football for the Miami Hurricanes.

== Early life ==
Quarterman grew up in Orange Park, Florida, and attended Oakleaf High School. He posted 137 tackles, 8 tackles for loss and 3.5 sacks for the Knights in his junior season. He was rated four-stars and as one of the top 10 inside linebacker recruits in the nation by ESPN, Scout.com, Rivals.com and 247Sports and committed to play college football at the University of Miami during his junior year. As a senior, Quarterman made 101 tackles and was named the Regional Defensive Player of the Year by The Florida Times-Union and played in the All-America Bowl after the end of the season. He finished his high school career with 412 tackles (23.5 for loss) and six sacks.

== College career ==
Quarterman enrolled early at Miami and was named a starter at inside linebacker for the Hurricanes going into his freshman season. He started all 13 Miami's games and finished second on the team with 84 tackles, with 10 going for a loss, and three sacks and was named was named third-team All-Atlantic Coast Conference (ACC) by the league's coaches and honorable mention by the media. Quarterman was also named a freshman All-American by ESPN and Pro Football Focus. As a sophomore, Quarterman was named second-team All-ACC after again finishing second on the team in tackles with 83 with seven tackles for loss and 2.5 sacks with five passes broken up. He was named first-team All-ACC in his junior season after recording 82 tackles, 14 tackles for loss, six sacks, one interception, two pass breakups, six quarterback hurries, one forced fumble and one fumble recovery. Following the season, Quarterman contemplated forgoing his final season of NCAA eligibility to enter the 2019 NFL draft but ultimately decided to return to Miami for his senior year.

Quarterman was named a preseason All-American by the Associated Press and several other media outlets, as well as to the watchlists for the Butkus and Chuck Bednarik Awards, going into his senior season. Quarterman finished the season with 107 tackles, 15.5 tackles for loss, one sack, and one forced fumble and was again named first-team All-ACC.

== Professional career ==
Pre-draft measurables
Height	Weight	Arm length	Hand span	40-yard dash	Vertical jump	Broad jump	Bench press
6 ft 0 1/2 in (1.84 m)	234 lb (106 kg)	31 5/8 in (0.80 m)	9 1/8 in (0.23 m)	4.74 s	31.0 in (0.79 m)	10 ft 0 in (3.05 m)	23 reps
All values from NFL Combine

=== Jacksonville Jaguars ===
Quarterman was selected in the fourth round of the 2020 NFL draft by the Jacksonville Jaguars. Quarterman made his NFL debut on September 13, 2020, in the season opener against the Indianapolis Colts, playing on special teams. He was placed on injured reserve on November 7, 2020. He was activated on December 5, 2020.

=== Philadelphia Eagles ===
On August 5, 2024, Quarterman signed with the Philadelphia Eagles, but was waived six days later.

=== Los Angeles Chargers (first stint) ===
On August 12, 2024, Quarterman signed with the Los Angeles Chargers. He was released on August 27, and re-signed to the practice squad. He was released on October 9.

=== Carolina Panthers ===
On October 15, 2024, Quarterman signed with the Carolina Panthers practice squad. He was released on October 29.

=== Los Angeles Chargers (second stint) ===
On November 6, 2024, Quarterman was signed to the Los Angeles Chargers practice squad. He was signed to the active roster on November 16.
