= Jalen Rivers =

American football player (born 2002)

No. 74 – Cincinnati Bengals
- Position: Guard
- Roster status: Active

Personal information
- Born: September 12, 2002 (age 24); Portsmouth, Virginia, U.S.
- Listed height: 6 ft 6 in (1.98 m)
- Listed weight: 319 lb (145 kg)

Career information
- High school: Oakleaf (Orange Park, Florida)
- College: Miami (FL) (2020–2024)
- NFL draft: 2025: 5th round, 153rd overall pick

Career history
- Cincinnati Bengals (2025–present)
- Stats at Pro Football Reference

Jalen Rivers (born September 12, 2002) is an American professional football guard for the Cincinnati Bengals of the National Football League (NFL). He played college football for the Miami Hurricanes and was selected by the Bengals in the fifth round of the 2025 NFL draft.

== Early life ==
Rivers attended Oakleaf High School in Orange Park, Florida. He was rated as a four-star recruit, the 2nd overall player in the state of Florida, and the 32nd overall player in the class of 2020. He committed to play college football for the Miami Hurricanes over offers from schools such as Alabama, Florida, Florida State, and Georgia.

== College career ==
As a freshman in 2020, Rivers played seven games for Miami. In 2021, he started the first three games before missing the rest of the season with a knee injury. In 2022, Rivers appeared in nine games for the Hurricanes, making seven starts. In 2023, he started all 13 games, earning second-team all-ACC honors.

== Professional career ==
Pre-draft measurables
Height	Weight	Arm length	Hand span	Wingspan	40-yard dash	10-yard split	20-yard split	Broad jump	Bench press
6 ft 5 3/4 in (1.97 m)	319 lb (145 kg)	34 7/8 in (0.89 m)	10 in (0.25 m)	6 ft 11 7/8 in (2.13 m)	5.29 s	1.85 s	3.07 s	9 ft 0 in (2.74 m)	23 reps
All values from NFL Combine

Rivers was drafted by the Cincinnati Bengals with the 153rd pick in the fifth round of the 2025 NFL draft.
