= Oakleaf High School =

Location
- 4035 Plantation Oaks Boulevard; Orange Park, Florida; United States
- 30°10′13″N 81°50′2″W

Information
- Type: Public school
- Motto: Go Knights
- Established: 2010
- School district: Clay County School District
- Principal: Justin Fluent
- Teaching staff: 116.20 (on a FTE basis)
- Enrollment: 2,364 (2023–2024)
- Student to teacher ratio: 20.34
- Colors: Black and gold
- Nickname: Knights
- Website: www.oneclay.net/o/ohs/

Oakleaf High School is a high school located in Orange Park, Florida.

== History ==
The school began construction in 2007 and was completed in June 2010. The school's grand opening was August 16, 2010. The class of 2012 was the first class to graduate from Oakleaf High School. Since its opening, Oakleaf has gained a reputation for inclusiveness, being home to several multicultural organizations such as the Hispanic Club, Filipino Club, and Christian Club, as well as ranking within the top twenty schools in Florida for diversity of the student body.

== Athletics ==
Oakleaf's athletics include baseball, basketball, cheerleading, cross country, a dance team, football, golf, softball, swimming, volleyball, weightlifting, wrestling, tennis, marching band and soccer. The teams are called the Knights.

== Aviation/Aerospace Academy ==
Oakleaf High School is the only school in Clay County with the Aviation/Aerospace Academy. The academy brought several classes to the school to instruct the students in aviation. The academy has been a part of Oakleaf High School's course selection since its inaugural year. The school also has a health science program for students that want to work in the health field. Students can become Certified Nurse Assistants (CNAs) once they complete the requisite courses.

== Notable alumni ==
- Nassir Little, NBA (Attended freshman & sophomore year)
- Shaquille Quarterman, NFL linebacker
- Jalen Rivers, college football offensive tackle for the Miami Hurricanes
- Chris Westry, NFL cornerback
