= Deante Burton =

American football player (born 1994)

Profile
- Position: Cornerback

Personal information
- Born: July 12, 1994 (age 32); Berlin, Germany
- Listed height: 6 ft 2 in (1.88 m)
- Listed weight: 205 lb (93 kg)

Career information
- High school: Manhattan (Manhattan, Kansas)
- College: Kansas State
- NFL draft: 2017: undrafted

Career history
- Atlanta Falcons (2017–2018); Green Bay Packers (2018); Atlanta Falcons (2018)*; Houston Texans (2018); Indianapolis Colts (2019)*; Dallas Cowboys (2019–2021); Tennessee Titans (2022)*
- * Offseason or practice squad member only

Career NFL statistics
- Total tackles: 8
- Forced fumbles: 1
- Stats at Pro Football Reference

Deante Wayne Burton (born July 12, 1994) is an American football cornerback. He signed with the Atlanta Falcons as an undrafted free agent in 2017. He played college football at Kansas State University.

== Early life ==
Burton attended Manhattan High School, where he was a two-way player at wide receiver and cornerback. As a junior, he became a starter at both positions, tallying 244 receiving yards and 3 touchdowns.

As a senior, he broke one of his thumbs, but still managed to keep playing. He collected 20 receptions for 327 yards, 5 receiving touchdowns, 216 rushing yards, 3 rushing touchdowns and 2 interceptions. He also received first-team All-Centennial League and All-state honors for his production at defensive back.

== College career ==
Burton accepted a football scholarship from Kansas State University. As a sophomore, he was named a starter at wide receiver during the season, posting 17 receptions for 171 yards.

As a junior, he tallied 38 receptions for 510 yards and 4 touchdowns. Against West Virginia University, he had 5 catches for 135 yards, including a 77-yard touchdown, while earning Big 12 Offensive Player of the Week honors.

As a senior, he registered 29 receptions for 404 yards and one touchdown. He finished his college career with 84 receptions for 1,085 yards and 5 touchdowns, becoming the school’s 29th career 1,000-yard receiver.

== Professional career ==
=== Atlanta Falcons ===
Burton was signed as an undrafted free agent by the Atlanta Falcons after the 2017 NFL draft on May 1. He was waived by the Falcons on September 2, but was signed to their practice squad the next day, where he was converted into a cornerback.

He signed a reserve/future contract with the Falcons on January 15, 2018. On September 1, Burton was released by the Falcons and was signed to the practice squad the next day. He was promoted to the active roster on September 4. He played in the season opener against the Philadelphia Eagles and had one special teams tackle. Burton was waived on September 10.

=== Green Bay Packers ===
On September 11, 2018, Burton was claimed off waivers by the Green Bay Packers. He was declared inactive for the second game against the Minnesota Vikings. He was waived on September 19.

=== Atlanta Falcons (second stint) ===
On September 25, 2018, Burton was signed to the Atlanta Falcons' practice squad.

=== Houston Texans ===
On October 31, 2018, Burton was signed by the Houston Texans off the Falcons practice squad, to provide depth because of injuries. He appeared in 2 games as a backup. He was waived on August 26, 2019.

=== Indianapolis Colts ===
On September 24, 2019, Burton was signed to the Indianapolis Colts' practice squad.

=== Dallas Cowboys ===
On November 20, 2019, Burton was signed by the Dallas Cowboys from the Colts practice squad, after cornerback Anthony Brown was placed on the injured reserve list. He appeared in 3 games as a backup.

On September 5, 2020, Burton was waived by the Cowboys and signed to the practice squad the next day. He was elevated to the active roster on September 26 and November 26 for the team's Weeks 3 and 12 games against the Seattle Seahawks and Washington Football Team, and reverted to the practice squad after each game. Burton was signed to the active roster on December 7. He was placed on injured reserve on December 19.

On August 31, 2021, Burton was waived by the Cowboys and re-signed to the practice squad the next day. He was released on December 15.

=== Tennessee Titans ===
On August 13, 2022, Burton signed with the Tennessee Titans, but was waived three days later.
