= Aaron Parker (American football) =

American football player (born 1998)

No. 19
- Position: Wide receiver

Personal information
- Born: May 21, 1998 (age 28); Prince George's County, Maryland, U.S.
- Listed height: 6 ft 3 in (1.91 m)
- Listed weight: 208 lb (94 kg)

Career information
- High school: Gwynn Park (Brandywine, Maryland)
- College: Rhode Island
- NFL draft: 2020: undrafted

Career history
- Dallas Cowboys (2020–2021)*; Carolina Panthers (2021); Kansas City Chiefs (2022)*
- * Offseason or practice squad member only

Awards and highlights
- 2× First-team All-CAA (2018, 2019)
- Stats at Pro Football Reference

Aaron Parker (born May 21, 1998) is an American former professional football wide receiver. He played college football at Rhode Island.

== College career ==
Parker played for the Rhode Island Rams for four seasons. He finished his collegiate career with 216 receptions for 3,460 yards and 30 touchdowns in 44 games played.

== Professional career ==
Pre-draft measurables
Height	Weight	Arm length	Hand span	Wingspan	40-yard dash	10-yard split	20-yard split	20-yard shuttle	Three-cone drill	Vertical jump	Broad jump	Bench press
6 ft 1 5/8 in (1.87 m)	209 lb (95 kg)	31 1/8 in (0.79 m)	9 1/8 in (0.23 m)	6 ft 2 1/4 in (1.89 m)	4.57 s	1.54 s	2.70 s	4.23 s	6.94 s	26.5 in (0.67 m)	9 ft 4 in (2.84 m)	12 reps
All values from NFL Combine

=== Dallas Cowboys ===
Parker signed with the Dallas Cowboys as an undrafted free agent on April 25, 2020, shortly after the conclusion of the 2020 NFL draft. He was waived by the Cowboys during final roster cuts on September 5, 2020, and was resigned to the team's practice squad the following day After the season Parker was re-signed by the Cowboys to a reserve/futures contract on January 4, 2021. He was waived at the end of the preseason on August 31, 2021.

=== Carolina Panthers ===
Parker was signed by the Carolina Panthers to their practice squad on September 2, 2021. Parker was elevated to the Panthers' active roster on October 24, 2021. He signed a reserve/future contract with the Panthers on January 10, 2022. He was waived on May 12, 2022.

=== Kansas City Chiefs ===
Parker was signed by the Kansas City Chiefs on June 16, 2022. He was waived by the Chiefs on August 27.
