= Marcus Henry (offensive lineman) =

American football player (born 1993)

Profile
- Position: Center

Personal information
- Born: February 11, 1993 (age 33); Bellevue, Washington, U.S.
- Listed height: 6 ft 2 in (1.88 m)
- Listed weight: 303 lb (137 kg)

Career information
- High school: Bellevue
- College: Boise State
- NFL draft: 2016: undrafted

Career history
- New Orleans Saints (2016)*; Seattle Seahawks (2018–2019)*; New Orleans Saints (2019)*; Houston Texans (2019)*; Dallas Cowboys (2019–2020); Arizona Cardinals (2021)
- * Offseason or practice squad member only

Awards and highlights
- 2× First-team All-Mountain West (2014, 2015)

Career NFL statistics
- Games played: 6
- Stats at Pro Football Reference

Marcus Henry (born February 11, 1993) is an American football center. He played college football at Boise State University.

== Early life ==
Henry attended Bellevue High School. He was a two-way player, while contributing to the school winning the 3A State Championship in 2009 and 2010. As a junior, he received second-team All-conference honors. As a senior, he received All-state, All-Kingco and Kingco Conference Lineman of the Year honors.

== College career ==
Henry accepted a football scholarship from Boise State University. As a redshirt freshman, he appeared in 11 games, playing on the special teams units.

As a sophomore, he started 12 games at guard. He missed the season finale against University of New Mexico with an injury. As a junior, he started all 14 games.

As a senior, he started all 13 games. He finished his college career after playing in 50 games with 39 starts.

== Professional career ==
Pre-draft measurables
Height	Weight	Arm length	Hand span	40-yard dash	10-yard split	20-yard split	20-yard shuttle	Three-cone drill	Vertical jump	Broad jump	Bench press
6 ft 2 5/8 in (1.90 m)	299 lb (136 kg)	32 5/8 in (0.83 m)	8 3/4 in (0.22 m)	5.13 s	1.74 s	3.01 s	4.63 s	7.71 s	30.0 in (0.76 m)	8 ft 5 in (2.57 m)	28 reps
All values from Pro Day

=== New Orleans Saints ===
Henry was signed as an undrafted free agent by the New Orleans Saints after the 2016 NFL draft on May 2, 2016. He was waived during final roster cuts on September 3. In November, he suffered a torn ACL during a workout with the Buffalo Bills. In February 2018, he played in The Spring League in Austin, Texas, after being out football for a year, while recovering from his knee injury.

=== Seattle Seahawks ===
Henry signed with the Seattle Seahawks on May 7, 2018, after a mini-camp tryout. He was waived on August 3, and re-signed nine days later. He was waived during final roster cuts on September 1, and signed to the team's practice squad on September 19. He was released on September 25, and re-signed to the practice squad on December 19.

Henry signed a reserve/futures contract with the Seahawks on January 8, 2019, but was waived before the start of training camp on May 1.

=== New Orleans Saints (second stint) ===
After participating in a mini-camp tryout, Henry re-signed with the New Orleans Saints on May 13, 2019. He was waived by New Orleans during final roster cuts on August 31.

=== Houston Texans ===
Henry signed with the Houston Texans' practice squad on October 9, 2019, and was released one week later.

=== Dallas Cowboys ===
Henry signed with the Dallas Cowboys' practice squad on November 20, 2019. He signed a reserve/futures contract with the Cowboys on December 30.

Henry was waived during final roster cuts on September 5, 2020, and re-signed to the team's practice squad the next day. He was elevated to the active roster on October 10 and October 19 for the team's weeks 5 and 6 games against the New York Giants and Arizona Cardinals, and reverted to the practice squad following each game. He signed a reserve/future contract with the Cowboys on January 4, 2021. He was waived by the Cowboys on March 19.

=== Arizona Cardinals ===
On July 26, 2021, Henry signed with the Arizona Cardinals. He was waived/injured on August 31, and placed on injured reserve. Henry was waived off injured reserve on September 9. He was re-signed to the practice squad on November 1. Henry was promoted to the active roster on November 9. He was waived on May 16, 2022.
