= Azur Kamara =

American football player (born 1998)

Profile
- Position: Linebacker

Personal information
- Born: September 26, 1998 (age 28); Abidjan, Ivory Coast
- Listed height: 6 ft 4 in (1.93 m)
- Listed weight: 235 lb (107 kg)

Career information
- High school: Central (Phoenix, Arizona, U.S.)
- College: Kansas
- NFL draft: 2020: undrafted

Career history
- Dallas Cowboys (2020–2021); Carolina Panthers (2021); Kansas City Chiefs (2022)*; Edmonton Elks (2024)*
- * Offseason or practice squad member only

Career NFL statistics
- Total tackles: 3
- Stats at Pro Football Reference

Azur Kamara (born September 26, 1998) is an Ivorian professional gridiron football linebacker. He played college football at Kansas. He signed with the Dallas Cowboys as an undrafted free agent. He has also been a member of the Carolina Panthers, Kansas City Chiefs, and Edmonton Elks.

== Early life ==
Kamara was born in Abidjan, Ivory Coast. He moved to the United States at the age of 10, after his mother finally gained approval to send for her four children (there was a maximum of three children allowed). His mother had arrived 5 years earlier as a refugee from the First Ivorian Civil War.

He attended Central High School. As a freshman, he began playing American football for the first time. As a senior, he had 106 tackles, 25.5 sacks, 4 forced fumbles and one fumble recovery, while receiving All-conference honors.

== College career ==
=== Arizona Western ===
Kamara enrolled at Arizona Western College. As a freshman, he tallied 45 tackles, 13.5 tackles-for-loss, 8 sacks, 4 forced fumbles and 2 fumble recoveries.

As a sophomore, he posted 30 tackles, 15.5 tackles-for-loss (led the team), 12.5 sacks, 3 forced fumbles, one pass breakup and one blocked kick, while contributing to the team reaching the NJCAA national title game.

=== Kansas ===
He transferred to the University of Kansas after his sophomore season. As a junior, he appeared in all 12 games with 3 starts. He registered 16 tackles (5 for loss), one sack, one quarterback hurry, one pass breakup and one forced fumble.

As a senior, he was named the starter at outside linebacker. He started 12 games, while making 51 tackles (sixth on the team), 6 tackles-for-loss (second on the team), 3.5 sacks and 4 quarterback hurries.

Kamara played with fellow Jayhawk Hakeem Adeniji in the 2020 Senior Bowl.

== Professional career ==
Pre-draft measurables
Height	Weight	Arm length	Hand span	40-yard dash	10-yard split	20-yard split	20-yard shuttle	Three-cone drill	Vertical jump	Broad jump	Bench press
6 ft 3 1/4 in (1.91 m)	245 lb (111 kg)	35 1/4 in (0.90 m)	10 in (0.25 m)	4.59 s	1.63 s	2.71 s	4.46 s	7.20 s	28.0 in (0.71 m)	10 ft 1 in (3.07 m)	13 reps
All values from NFL Combine

=== Dallas Cowboys ===
Kamara was signed as an undrafted free agent by the Dallas Cowboys after the 2020 NFL draft on April 27, 2020. On August 1, 2020, he was waived with an injury designation. After going unclaimed on waivers, he reverted to the Cowboys' injured reserve.

During training camp in 2021, Kamara, along with his mother, who attended a game of his for the first time, were featured on Hard Knocks as he battled for a roster spot. He appeared in nine games, playing mostly on special teams, and recorded three tackles. He was waived on December 20.

=== Carolina Panthers ===
On December 21, 2021, Kamara was claimed off waivers by the Carolina Panthers. On December 22, he was placed on the reserve/COVID-19 list. He was activated from the reserve/COVID-19 list on December 28.

Kamara was waived on May 11, 2022.

=== Kansas City Chiefs ===
Kamara was signed by the Kansas City Chiefs on July 27, 2022. He was released during final roster cut downs on August 30, 2022. The following day he was signed to the practice squad. He was waived off the practice squad on September 6, 2022. He was later re-signed on November 1. He was released on November 29.

=== Edmonton Elks ===
Kamara signed with the Edmonton Elks on April 11, 2024. He was released on May 11, 2024.
