= Anthony Brown (cornerback) =

American football player (born 1993)

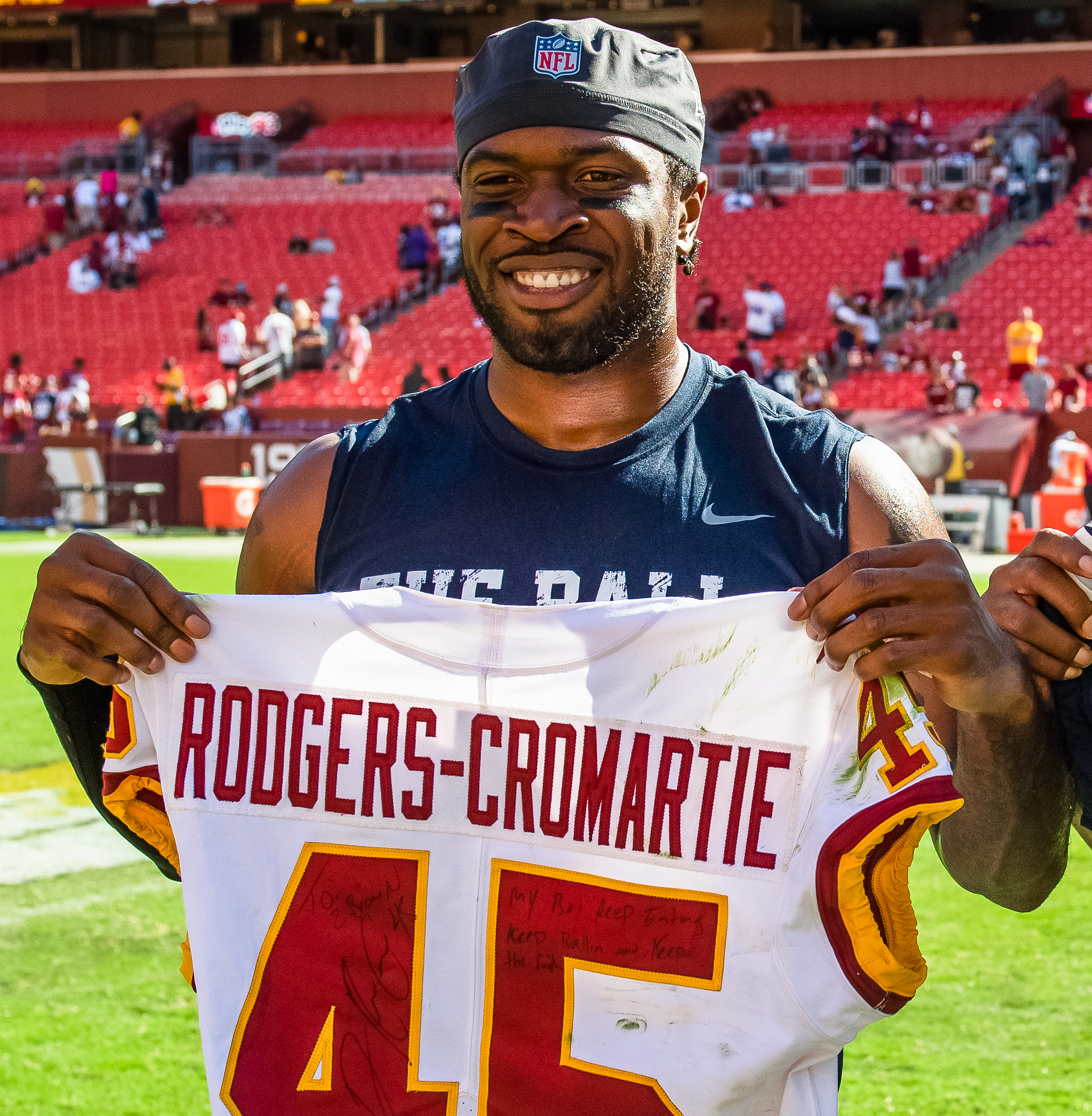
- Brown with the Dallas Cowboys in 2019

Profile
- Position: Cornerback

Personal information
- Born: December 15, 1993 (age 32); Tampa, Florida, U.S.
- Listed height: 5 ft 11 in (1.80 m)
- Listed weight: 192 lb (87 kg)

Career information
- High school: Hillsborough (Tampa)
- College: Purdue
- NFL draft: 2016: 6th round, 189th overall pick

Career history
- Dallas Cowboys (2016–2022); Pittsburgh Steelers (2023)*; San Francisco 49ers (2023); New York Jets (2023)*; Carolina Panthers (2024)
- * Offseason or practice squad member only

Career NFL statistics
- Total tackles: 324
- Sacks: 4.0
- Forced fumbles: 5
- Fumble recoveries: 1
- Interceptions: 9
- Pass deflections: 59
- Defensive touchdowns: 2
- Stats at Pro Football Reference

Anthony Shaquille Brown (born December 15, 1993) is an American professional football cornerback. He played college football for the Purdue Boilermakers and was selected by the Dallas Cowboys of the National Football League (NFL) in the sixth round of the 2016 NFL draft.

== Early life ==
Brown attended Hillsborough High School, where he played football. He was a two-year starter and received second-team All-Hillsborough County honors. As a junior, he tallied 69 tackles, one interception, one pass defensed and four receptions for 52 yards. In his last year he was a two-way player, posting 25 tackles, two interceptions, three passes defensed, 911 rushing yards, 14 rushing touchdowns, 18 receptions for 239 yards and one touchdown. He also practiced track.

College recruiting
Name	Hometown	School	Height	Weight	Commit date
Anthony Brown; CB	Tampa, Florida	Hillsborough High School	5 ft 11 in (1.80 m)	175 lb (79 kg)	Sep 30, 2011
Anthony Brown; CB	Recruit ratings: Scout: Rivals: 247Sports: (72)				
Overall recruit ranking: Scout: – (CB) Rivals: 51 (CB), 100 (FL) ESPN: 145 (S), 283 (FL)
Note: In many cases, Scout, Rivals, 247Sports, On3, and ESPN may conflict in their listings of height and weight.; In these cases, the average was taken. ESPN grades are on a 100-point scale.; Sources: "Purdue Football Commitment List". Rivals.; "Purdue College Football Recruiting Commits". Scout.; "ESPN". ESPN.; "Scout.com Team Recruiting Rankings". Scout.; "2012 Team Ranking". Rivals.com.

== College career ==
Brown accepted a scholarship from Purdue University. He became a starter as a sophomore, registering 69 tackles (second on the team), 3 tackles for loss, 3 passes defensed and one forced fumble. The next year, he posted 54 tackles (fifth on the team), 5.5 tackles for loss, 1.5 sacks, 10 passes defensed, and one fumble recovery. As a senior, he made 60 tackles (fourth on the team), 4 interceptions (first interceptions of his career) and 6 passes defensed.

=== Statistics ===
Year	Team	Tackles						Interceptions				
Year	Team	Cmb	Solo	Ast	TfL	Sck	FF	Int	Yds	Avg	TD	PD
2012	Purdue	6	4	2	0.0	0.0	0	0	0	0.0	0	0
2013	Purdue	69	51	18	3.0	0.0	1	0	0	0.0	0	3
2014	Purdue	54	41	13	5.5	1.5	0	0	0	0.0	0	10
2015	Purdue	60	41	19	1.0	0.0	0	4	4	1.0	0	6
Totals		189	137	52	9.5	1.5	1	4	4	1.0	0	19

== Professional career ==
Pre-draft measurables
Height	Weight	Arm length	Hand span	40-yard dash	10-yard split	20-yard split	20-yard shuttle	Three-cone drill	Vertical jump	Broad jump	Bench press
5 ft 11 1/4 in (1.81 m)	192 lb (87 kg)	31 3/4 in (0.81 m)	8 1/4 in (0.21 m)	4.35 s	1.55 s	2.55 s	4.19 s	7.03 s	35 in (0.89 m)	9 ft 7 in (2.92 m)	19 reps
All values from NFL Combine

=== Dallas Cowboys ===
External videos
- Cowboys draft Anthony Brown 189th overall

==== 2016 ====
The Dallas Cowboys selected Brown in the sixth round with the 189th overall pick in the 2016 NFL draft. Brown was the 27th cornerback drafted in 2016. On May 18, 2016, the Cowboys signed Brown to a four-year, $2.47 million contract that includes a signing bonus of $134,947.

Throughout training camp, Brown competed to be a backup cornerback against Josh Thomas, Isaiah Frey, Dax Swanson, and Deji Olatoye. Head coach Jason Garrett named Brown the fourth cornerback on the depth chart to start the regular season. He began the season behind Brandon Carr, Morris Claiborne, and Orlando Scandrick.

He made his professional regular season debut in the Cowboys’ season-opener against the New York Giants and made one solo tackle during their 20–19 loss. On September 25, 2016, Brown earned his first career start in place of Orlando Scandrick who was inactive due to a hamstring injury. Brown finished the Cowboys’ 31–17 victory against the Chicago Bears with four combined tackles. In Week 6, he collected a season-high 11 combined tackles (ten solo) during a 30–16 win at the Green Bay Packers. Brown began to see extended play beginning in Week 9 of the season after Morris Claiborne sustained a groin injury the previous week. On December 11, 2016, Brown recorded two solo tackles, broke up a pass, and made his first career interception as the Cowboys lost 10–7 at the New York Giants in Week 14. Brown intercepted a pass attempt by Giants’ quarterback Eli Manning, that was originally intended for wide receiver Victor Cruz in the fourth quarter. He finished his rookie season in 2016 with 55 combined tackles (40 solo), eight pass deflections, and one interception in 16 games and nine starts.

The Dallas Cowboys finished first in the NFC East with a 13–3 record and earned a first round bye. On January 15, 2017, Brown recorded one tackle during a 34–31 loss to the Packers in the NFC Divisional Round.

==== 2017 ====
Brown entered training camp as a possible candidate to win the role as a starting cornerback after Brandon Carr departed in free agency. He competed against Orlando Scandrick, Nolan Carroll, Chidobe Awuzie, and Jourdan Lewis. Head coach Jason Garrett named Brown the fourth cornerback on the depth chart to begin the regular season, behind Orlando Scandrick, Nolan Carroll, and Chidobe Awuzie.

He appeared in the Cowboys’ season-opener against the Giants on Sunday Night Football and recorded one solo tackle, broke up a pass, and intercepted a pass by Giants’ quarterback Eli Manning in the fourth quarter of their 19–3 victory. The following week, he collected a season-high seven solo tackles during a 42–17 loss at the Denver Broncos in Week 2. He earned his first start of the season in Week 2 after Nolan Carroll suffered a concussion and was subsequently released on October 11, 2017. Brown started the next ten games, but was eventually benched for Chidobe Awuzie in Week 13 and remained a backup for the last five games of the regular season. On December 31, 2017, Brown recorded six combined tackles, deflected a pass, and made his first career sack in the Cowboys’ 6–0 win at the Philadelphia Eagles in Week 17. Brown sacked Eagles’ backup quarterback Nate Sudfeld for a 14-yard loss in the third quarter. Brown finished the 2017 NFL season with 56 combined tackles (47 solo), 11 pass deflections, two interceptions, and a sack in 16 games and ten starts.

==== 2018 ====
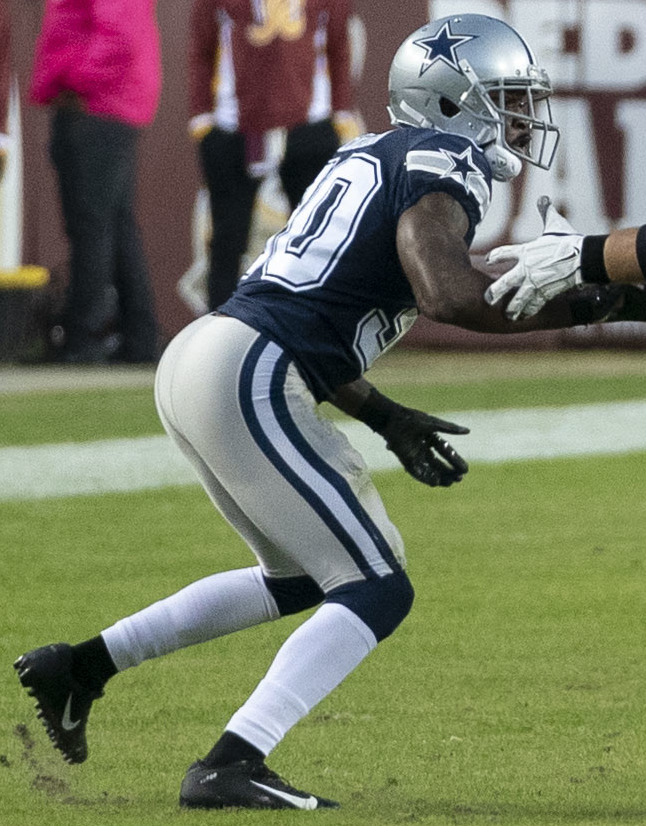
Brown in a game against the Washington Redskins

During training camp, Brown competed to be a starting cornerback against Byron Jones after Jones was moved from free safety to cornerback. Head coach Jason Garrett named Brown the third cornerback and first-team nickelback on the Cowboys’ depth chart to begin the regular season. He was listed on the depth chart behind Chidobe Awuzie and Byron Jones.

==== 2019 ====
Brown entered the 2019 season as the third cornerback on the depth chart behind Byron Jones and Chidobe Awuzie. In Week 11, Brown suffered a torn triceps and was ruled out the rest of the season. He finished the season playing in nine games with four starts, recording 17 tackles and five passes defensed.

==== 2020 ====
Brown re-signed with the Cowboys on a three-year contract on March 20, 2020. On September 19, 2020, he was placed on injured reserve with a rib injury. He was designated to return from injured reserve on October 7, and began practicing with the team again. He was activated on October 10. In Week 5 against the Giants, Brown returned a fumble forced by teammate DeMarcus Lawrence on Daniel Jones for a 29-yard touchdown during the 37–34 win. In Week 15 against the San Francisco 49ers, Brown recorded his first interception of the season off a pass thrown by Nick Mullens during the 41–33 win.

==== 2021 ====
Brown was named the starter at right cornerback, helping fill the void left by Chidobe Awuzie's departure in free agency. In a Week 12 36–33 Cowboys loss to the Las Vegas Raiders on Thanksgiving, Brown committed 4 defensive pass interference penalties for 91 yards, including one to set up the Raiders' game-winning field goal in overtime. He was the first player since at least 2000 to commit 4 pass interference penalties in a single game. However, Brown statistically had the best season of his career, as he accumulated career-highs with 16 starts, 79 tackles (third on the team), 3 interceptions (tied for second on the team), 17 passes defensed (second on the team), one forced fumble and one defensive touchdown.

==== 2022 ====
Brown returned as the Cowboys starting cornerback in 2022. He suffered a torn Achilles tendon in Week 13 and was placed on season-ending injured reserve on December 10, 2022.

=== Pittsburgh Steelers ===
On August 30, 2023, Brown was signed to the practice squad of the Pittsburgh Steelers. He was released on September 14.

=== San Francisco 49ers ===
On September 19, 2023, Brown signed a one-year contract with the 49ers, but was released on September 21. On September 22, the 49ers re-signed Brown to a one-year contract. He was released by the 49ers on October 31.

=== New York Jets ===
On November 28, 2023, Brown was signed to the New York Jets practice squad. He was not signed to a reserve/future contract after the season and thus became a free agent upon the expiration of his practice squad contract.

=== Carolina Panthers ===
On August 3, 2024, Brown signed with the Carolina Panthers. He was placed on injured reserve on August 19. He was released on December 17.
