= 2016 Dallas Cowboys season =

57th season in franchise history; last season for Tony Romo

- Owner: Jerry Jones
- General manager: Jerry Jones
- Head coach: Jason Garrett
- Home stadium: AT&T Stadium

Results
- Record: 13–3
- Division place: 1st NFC East
- Playoffs: Lost Divisional Playoffs (vs. Packers) 31–34
- All-Pros: 5: RB Ezekiel Elliott (1st team); LT Tyron Smith (1st team); C Travis Frederick (1st team); RG Zack Martin (1st team); LB Sean Lee (1st team)
- Pro Bowlers: 7: QB Dak Prescott; RB Ezekiel Elliott; WR Dez Bryant; T Tyron Smith; G Zack Martin; C Travis Frederick; ILB Sean Lee

Uniform
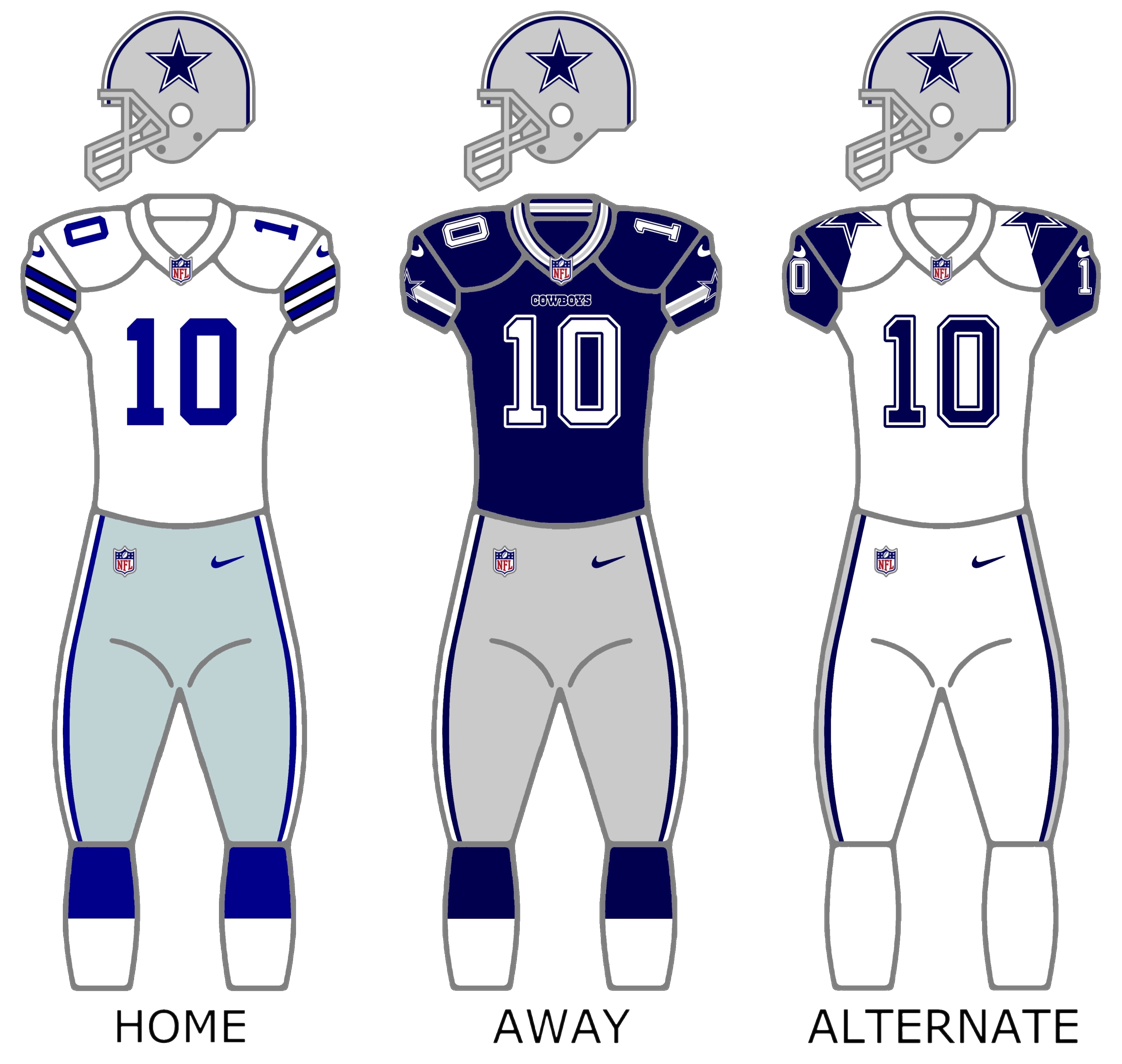

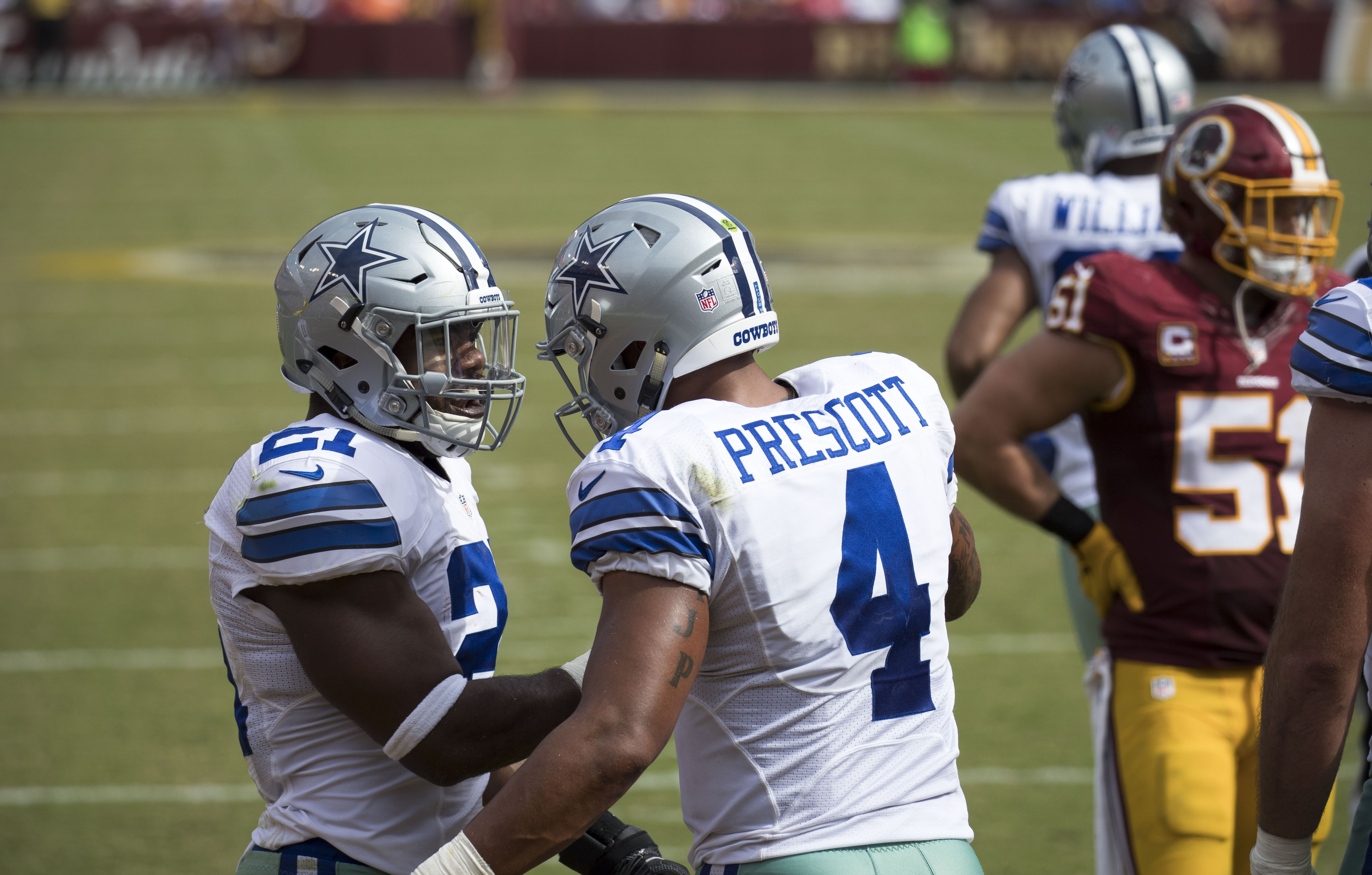
Dak Prescott and Ezekiel Elliott during the Cowboys at Redskins game in September.

The 2016 season was the Dallas Cowboys' 57th in the National Football League (NFL), their 28th under the ownership of Jerry Jones, their eighth playing their home games at AT&T Stadium, and their sixth full season under head coach Jason Garrett.

After losing their first game to the New York Giants, the Cowboys won 11 straight games. The streak ended with them losing again to the same team in week 14, making this the first time since 2011 that the Cowboys were swept by the Giants. With division rivals Washington Redskins losing to the Arizona Cardinals in Week 13, the Cowboys clinched a playoff berth after missing the playoffs the previous year. Following the Giants' loss to the Philadelphia Eagles in Week 16, the Cowboys became NFC East champions for the second time in three years and clinched home-field advantage throughout the playoffs for the first time since 2007. The 13–3 record, which was 9 wins more than their injury-plagued season they had the year before, is tied for the best record in team history, equaling its 1992 and 2007 records.

Despite this achievement, the Cowboys were upset by the 4th seeded Green Bay Packers by a score of 34–31 in the divisional round of the playoffs, ending their season and extending their NFC Championship game drought to 22 seasons. This was also quarterback Tony Romo's last season in the NFL, as he announced his retirement on April 4, 2017. The Cowboys became the first team since the AFL-NFL merger to rise from the bottom of the NFC to the top seed in one season.

== Offseason ==
Cowboys 2016 free agents
Position	Player	Restriction	Date signed	2016 team
G	Mackenzy Bernadeau	UFA	March 11	Jacksonville Jaguars
T	Charles Brown (Note: Brown was resigned, but later retired and did not play in the 2016 season.)	UFA	March 10	-
QB	Matt Cassel	UFA	March 9	Tennessee Titans
CB	Morris Claiborne	UFA	March 11	Dallas Cowboys
FB	Tyler Clutts	UFA	-	-
DE	Jack Crawford	UFA	April 4	Dallas Cowboys
RB	Lance Dunbar	UFA	March 17	Dallas Cowboys
TE	James Hanna	UFA	March 11	Dallas Cowboys
DE	Greg Hardy	UFA	-	-
DT	Nick Hayden	UFA	-	-
S	Jeff Heath	RFA	April 13	Dallas Cowboys
G	Ronald Leary	RFA	April 28	Dallas Cowboys
LB	Rolando McClain (Note: McClain was resigned, but later was suspended and did not play in the 2016 season.)	UFA	March 9	-
S	Danny McCray	UFA	-	-
DE	Jeremy Mincey	UFA	-	-
CB	Josh Thomas	UFA	March 10	Dallas Cowboys
RB	Robert Turbin	UFA	March 15	Indianapolis Colts
LB	Kyle Wilber	UFA	March 11	Dallas Cowboys
RFA: Restricted free agent, UFA: Unrestricted free agent

=== Background ===
Coming into the offseason the Cowboys had a few positions that concerned them as a result of injuries, suspensions, and players potentially leaving the team. The positions that were of most concern were quarterback, defensive back, and pass rusher. The Cowboys had a total of eighteen players entering the free agency, which meant the players were free to negotiate with and sign a contract to play with any team in the league. Of the eighteen players, two of them were restricted free agents, which meant they could get offers from other teams, and the Cowboys would have opportunity to match the offer and keep the player on their roster. The free agency process officially started on March 9 for all thirty-two teams.

Offense

After losing ten out of the eleven games without Romo in 2015, the Dallas Cowboys wanted to find a reliable back up quarterback, either through the draft, or by signing a veteran free agent. The Cowboys met with the top three quarterbacks entering the draft: Jared Goff, Carson Wentz, and Paxton Lynch, all of whom were projected to be drafted in the first round. Another prospect for the Cowboys was Mississippi State quarterback Dak Prescott, who met with the team on four separate occasions leading some to believe he would be their target in the middle rounds of the draft. Including Prescott, Goff, Wentz and Lynch, the Cowboys had pre-draft meetings with a total of seven quarterbacks entering the draft. Cowboys also looked at veteran quarterback Matt Moore, having him visit with the organization in March before he re-signed with the Miami Dolphins later in the month. After a mediocre performance the previous year, quarterback Matt Cassel entered free agency. Tight end James Hanna re-signed with the Cowboys with a three-year contract worth $8.2 million on March 11. Running back Lance Dunbar re-signed to a one-year contract worth $1.7 million on March 17. After the window to receive offers from other teams while being a restricted free agent closed, guard Ronald Leary re-signed with the Cowboys for a one-year deal worth $2.5 million on April 28.

Defense

On the defensive side of the team the Cowboys were coming off a year where they only had 8 interceptions, and needed to make improvements with their defensive backs. Orlando Scandrick who was a starting cornerback for the team in 2013 and 2014, was still recovering from the ACL and MCL injury that happened during practice in 2015 causing him to miss the entire season. Cornerbacks Josh Thomas and Morris Claiborne both were unrestricted free agents and could potentially be signed by another team. Within the first two days after free agency started, they both were re-signed to the Cowboys, Claiborne for a one-year deal worth $3 million, and Thomas for a one-year contract. Defensive backs Nolan Carroll, Leon Hall and Patrick Robinson were brought in to meet with the Cowboys during free agency. Safety Jeff Heath re-signed for a four-year contract worth $7.6 million on April 13.

In regards to their needs with the pass rush Sports Illustrated writer Chris Burke said that defensive end was the position that most needed to be improve for the Cowboys. Defensive end Randy Gregory had a suspension for the first four games of the season as a result of abusing the leagues substance abuse policy, which would later be increased by ten games. One of the Cowboys other defensive ends, DeMarcus Lawrence was recovering from back surgery spreading their defensive line even more thin. Defensive tackle Nick Hayden, defensive ends Greg Hardy, Jeremy Mincey and Jack Crawford, all were entering the free agency. Crawford was the only one to be re-signed and was given a one-year deal worth $1.1 million on March 9. Defensive end Jason Jones was brought in to visit the Cowboys on March 28. Linebacker Kyle Wilber re-signed for a two-year contract worth $3.2 million on March 11.

=== Departures ===
Of the eighteen Cowboys players who were in the free agency, the Cowboys were able to re-sign ten of them for the 2016 season. From those ten, linebacker Rolando McClain was re-signed on March 9, but due to a suspension he received from the league for violating the NFL's drug policy he missed the entire season. Offensive tackle Charles Brown was re-signed on March 10, but in July decided to retire and was placed on the reserved/retired list. From the eight that weren't re-signed, four of them signed with other teams. The first of these three was quarterback Matt Cassel, who left for the free agency after being benched in the previous season when he lost six of his seven games as a starter. He went on to be signed by the Tennessee Titans on March 9. The next player to sign with another team was guard Mackenzy Bernadeau who signed a contract with the Jacksonville Jaguars on March 11. Next up was running back Robert Turbin who signed a contract with the Indianapolis Colts on March 15. The last player to sign with another team was defensive tackle Nick Hayden who signed with the Cleveland Browns in March, but ended up being released in August and not playing during the season. Players that did not sign with the Cowboys or any other teams included defensive end Greg Hardy who was a free agent that had a lot of off the field issues. It was reported that Hardy not being re-signed was likely more due to fitting in with the Cowboys locker room rather than due to the off the field issues. Defensive end Jeremy Mincey decided to retired in August. The last two free agents, 31-year-old fullback Tyler Clutts and 28-year-old safety Danny McCray both were not re-signed, speculated to be due to their age.

=== Acquisitions ===
While most of the activity made by the Cowboys during free agency was re-signing their own players, they also made a few acquisitions of players from other teams to add to their roster. Defensive end Cedric Thornton was the first to be acquired, signing a four-year contract worth $18 million on March 10. Thorton comes from one of the Cowboys divisional rivals, the Philadelphia Eagles, and moved from defensive end to defensive tackle. At the time of his signing, he was believed to be the likely replacement for Hayden who was still in the free agency. Continuing to work on the improvement of their defensive line, the next acquisition for the Cowboys was defensive end Benson Mayowa from the Oakland Raiders, who signed a three-year contract on March 18 worth $8.5 million. Mayowa was a restricted free agent, and the Raiders had five days to match the offer to retain him, but they declined to do so, allowing the Cowboys to improve their pass rush some more. The next free agent acquisition was from another divisional rival, when the Cowboys signed Washington Redskins running back Alfred Morris. Morris signed a contract on March 22 for 2 years and worth $3.5 million. Morris will be added into the running back rotation with starter Darren McFadden, who replaced Joseph Randle last year as the starter after Randle was injured and later cut for off the field issues. The final free agent acquisition the Cowboys made was offensive lineman Joe Looney from the Tennessee Titans, who was signed on March 29. He is a flexible player who can play both center and guard, similar to the role Bernadeau had. Looney's contract was for two years and worth $1.6 million.

=== 2016 NFL draft ===
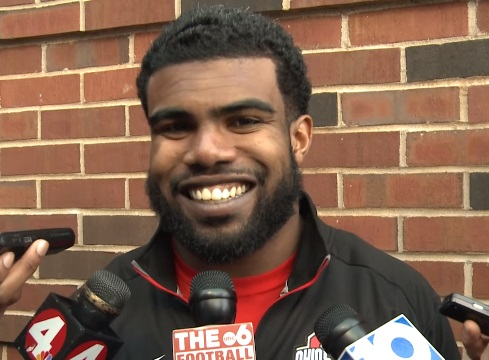
Ezekiel Elliott interviewed in 2015

The Dallas Cowboys had nine draft picks for the 2016 NFL draft which was scheduled to take place from April 28 to 30 in Chicago, Illinois. The Cowboys originally had only five picks as a results of trades with the Raiders, 49ers and Seahawks, but were awarded four compensatory picks on March 11 as a result of the net loss of players in free agency before the 2015 season. One of the compensatory picks received was a fourth round draft pick, and the other three picks were all in the sixth round. After all the trades and the compensatory picks given, the Cowboys had one pick in each of the first three rounds, two picks in the fourth, zero in the fifth, four picks in the sixth round, and zero in the seventh. In January Neil Hornsby, the founder of Pro Football Focus, ranked the offseason needs for the Dallas Cowboys, and said the top needs for the draft were quarterback, cornerback, guard, and running back. Leading up to the draft two of these needs, running back and guard, were addressed with the addition of Morris and Looney to the team during free agency. As the draft got closer on April 26, Bleacher Report also listed running back, quarterback and cornerback in their top five needs for the Cowboys in the draft, along with defensive end and safety.

The Dallas Cowboys (are my pick). I want to go play behind that great offensive line they have down in Dallas.

— Ezekiel Elliott

With the fourth overall pick in the draft, the Cowboys used their first round selection to draft Ezekiel Elliott from Ohio State. Prior to the draft the Cowboys had met with Elliott on two separate occasions, once in Ohio, and a second time in Dallas. Elliott averaged seven yards per carry during his three-year college career, and had over 1,800 yards in both of his final two years. In the 2015 season, Elliott was named unanimously to the first team of the All-Big Ten Conference, and second on the 2015 College Football All-America Team. Along with being first team Big Ten, Elliott was also named the offensive player of the year and the MVP for the conference. In the 2014 season he and the Ohio State Buckeyes won the Big Ten Championship along with the College Football National Championship in which Elliott was named MVP. In early February during an interview on NFL Network when asked about which team he wanted to be picked by, Elliott responded with: "The Dallas Cowboys. I want to go play behind that great offensive line they have down in Dallas." Elliott was expected to help the Cowboys in the running game as he would be behind what was considered by some to be the best offensive line in the NFL. Elliott's presence would also help with the passing game due to his blocking abilities and the fact that defenses would have to respect the backfield with him there, which would increase the effectiveness of play-action passes. Elliott became the third running back to be drafted by the Cowboys with a top-20 pick. The previous two picks, Tony Dorsett in 1977 and Emmitt Smith in 1990 ended up being inducted into the Pro Football Hall of Fame, the latter also is the NFL's all-time leading rusher.

In the second round of the draft, the Cowboys selected Notre Dame linebacker Jaylon Smith with the 34th overall pick. Smith was named first team All-American in 2015, and led his team in tackles. Smith also won the Butkus Award, which is awarded to the best linebacker in the country at the high school, college, and professional levels. This was the second time Smith had won the award, the previous time in 2013 as a senior in high school. In the Fiesta Bowl game versus Ohio State, Smith suffered a knee injury that later was determined to be a torn ACL and torn MCL. With the injury to his knee, it was expected for him to miss a significant amount of time, potentially the entire season. The Cowboys team doctor was the ones to perform the surgery to repair his knee before the draft, so it was believed they might have a bit more knowledge of the situation than other teams. With their third round and fourth-round picks, the Cowboys shifted their focus to the defensive line. In the third, with the 67th overall pick, the Cowboys selected Nebraska defensive tackle Maliek Collins. In the fourth round with the 101st overall pick, the Cowboys selected Charles Tapper, a defensive end out of Oklahoma. In 2015 Collins was named to the second team All-Big Ten Conference, and Tapper was first team All-Big 12 Conference.

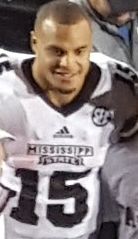
Dak Prescott in 2015

After selecting Elliott early in the first, the Cowboys attempted to trade with multiple teams for another first round selection to draft quarterback Paxton Lynch. They were unsuccessful in finding a trade and it wasn't until their second fourth-round pick that they decided on a quarterback with Mississippi State's Dak Prescott being selected 135th overall. Prescott was selected with one of the compensatory picks the Cowboys received for the draft. This marks the first time since 2009 the Cowboys have drafted a quarterback. While Prescott was the starter for Mississippi State, he broke 38 school records and lead them to a #1 ranking in 2014 for the first time in the school's history. Prescott was named to first team of both the 2014 and 2015 All-SEC football teams. Prescott was quickly compared to Tony Romo, being similar in size and being able to make plays with their feet. Prescott's athletic talents contributed greatly to the Cowboys picking him, but team official also noted his locker room presence and leadership abilities as influencing the decision as well. Prescott will enter training camp and try to compete with Kellen Moore for the backup quarterback role for the season, and then work towards become a starter, a task he accomplished both in high school and college. The Cowboys looked forward to developing Prescott over the years and were confident he was a worthwhile talent. When asked about not being the Cowboys first choice to draft, in regards to the attempt to trade up for Lynch, Dak responded with: “I'm sure at Mississippi State I wasn't the first one on the recruit board when I committed there. Everything works out and happens for a reason."

With no picks in the fifth or seventh round, the Cowboys finished their draft in the sixth round where they had four picks. Their first two picks were two defensive backs, Anthony Brown a cornerback from Purdue, selected 189th overall, and Kavon Frazier a safety from Central Michigan, selected 212th overall. Brown showed off his impressive speed at the NFL combine, where he ran the 40-yard dash in 4.35 seconds, the second fastest time of all cornerbacks attending. Brown was an honorable mention for the All-Big Ten Conference team, while Frazier was named second team All-MAC Conference. The Cowboys switched their focus back to the offense with their next two picks and selected back to back with the 216th and 217th overall picks. First was Darius Jackson a running back from Eastern Michigan, then followed up with Rico Gathers a basketball player out of Baylor with intentions to play tight end. Jackson was third team All-Mac Conference, and was expected to use his ability to catch the ball from the backfield to fill the void that would be left at start of season while Lance Dunbar was out after a knee surgery. Gathers hadn't played football since he was 13 years old, but was an honorable mention AP All-American college basketball athlete.

2016 Dallas Cowboys draft
Round	Pick	Player	Position	College	Notes
1	4	Ezekiel Elliott *	RB	Ohio State	
2	34	Jaylon Smith *	OLB	Notre Dame	
3	67	Maliek Collins	DT	Nebraska	
4	101	Charles Tapper	DE	Oklahoma	
4	135	Dak Prescott *	QB	Mississippi State	Compensatory
6	189	Anthony Brown	CB	Purdue	From Oakland
6	212	Kavon Frazier	S	Central Michigan	Compensatory
6	216	Darius Jackson	RB	Eastern Michigan	Compensatory
6	217	Rico Gathers	TE	Baylor	Compensatory
Made roster † Pro Football Hall of Fame * Made at least one Pro Bowl during career

Notes

- The Cowboys conditionally traded their fifth-round selection to the Oakland Raiders for wide receiver Brice Butler and the Raiders' 2016 sixth-round selection. The pick swap occurred after Butler spent six games on the Cowboys' 53-man roster in 2015.
- The Cowboys traded a sixth-round selection to the San Francisco 49ers in exchange for the 49ers' 2015 seventh-round selection.
- The Cowboys traded their seventh-round selection to the Seattle Seahawks in exchange for running back Christine Michael.

=== Undrafted free agents ===
Name	Position	College
Jake Brendel	Center	UCLA
Arjen Colquhoun	Defensive back	Michigan State
Rodney Coe	Defensive tackle	Akron
Shaneil Jenkins	Defensive end	Shepherd (WV)
Andy Jones	Wide receiver	Jacksonville
Deon King	Linebacker	Norfolk State
Jeremiah McKinnon	Cornerback	FIU
Mike McQueen	Tackle	Ohio
Rolan Milligan	Safety	Toledo
Austin Traylor	Tight end	Wisconsin
Zach Wood	Defensive line	SMU

== Staff ==
2016 Dallas Cowboys staff
Front office: Owner/president/general manager – Jerry Jones; COO/executive vice president/director of player personnel – Stephen Jones; Senior director of football operations/football administration – Todd Williams; Senior director college/pro personnel – Will McClay; Senior personnel executive – Tom Ciskowski; Director of college scouting – Lionel Vital; Director of pro scouting – Judd Garrett; Assistant director of college scouting – Chris Hall; Director of football research – Tom Robinson; Head coaches: Head coach – Jason Garrett; Offensive coaches: Offensive coordinator – Scott Linehan; Quarterbacks – Wade Wilson; Running backs – Gary Brown; Wide receivers – Derek Dooley; Assistant wide receivers – Kyle Valero; Tight ends – Mike Pope; Offensive line – Frank Pollack; Assistant offensive line – Marc Colombo; Senior offensive assistant – Steve Loney	Defensive coaches: Defensive coordinator – Rod Marinelli; Defensive tackle – Leon Lett; Defensive ends – Ben Bloom; Linebackers/pass game coordinator – Matt Eberflus; Secondary – Joe Baker; Safeties – Greg Jackson; Defensive assistant – Turner West; Special teams coaches: Special teams coordinator – Rich Bisaccia; Assistant special teams – Keith O'Quinn; Strength and conditioning: Strength and conditioning – Mike Woicik; Assistant strength and conditioning – Brett Bech; Assistant strength and conditioning – Kendall Smith

== Rosters ==
=== Opening preseason roster ===
Dallas Cowboys 2016 opening preseason roster
Quarterbacks: 17 Kellen Moore; 4 Dak Prescott; 9 Tony Romo; 7 Jameill Showers; Running backs: 21 Ezekiel Elliott; 34 Darius Jackson; 46 Alfred Morris; 41 Keith Smith FB/OLB; 45 Rod Smith FB/RB; Wide receivers: 11 Cole Beasley; 10 Chris Brown; 88 Dez Bryant; 19 Brice Butler; 81 Andy Jones; 16 Vince Mayle; 14 Rodney Smith; 15 Devin Street; 13 Lucky Whitehead; 83 Terrance Williams; Tight ends: 89 Gavin Escobar; 80 Rico Gathers; 87 Geoff Swaim; 86 Austin Traylor; 82 Jason Witten	Offensive linemen: 78 Cameron Bradfield T; 60 Jake Brendel G/C; 71 La'el Collins G; 72 Travis Frederick C; 68 Doug Free T; 79 Chaz Green T; 65 Ronald Leary G; 73 Joe Looney C/G; 61 Ryan Mack T; 70 Zack Martin G; 74 Mike McQueen G/T; 62 Jared Smith G; 77 Tyron Smith T; 63 Boston Stiverson G; 76 Bryan Witzmann T; Defensive linemen: 67 Rodney Coe DT; 58 Jack Crawford DT/DE; 98 Tyrone Crawford DT; 75 Gerald Dixon DT; 95 David Irving DE/DT; 69 Shaneil Jenkins DT/DE; 90 DeMarcus Lawrence DE; 66 Mike McAdoo DE; 97 Terrell McClain DT; 74 Lawrence Okoye DE/DT; 99 Ryan Russell DE; 79 Charles Tapper DE; 92 Cedric Thornton DT; 64 Zach Wood DT/DE	Linebackers: 44 Derek Akunne OLB; 56 Justin Durant OLB/MLB; 52 Andrew Gachkar OLB/MLB; 48 Brandon Hepburn MLB; 59 Anthony Hitchens MLB/OLB; 47 Deon King OLB; 50 Sean Lee OLB; 40 James Morris MLB; 49 Henoc Muamba OLB; 53 Mark Nzeocha MLB/OLB; 51 Kyle Wilber OLB; Defensive backs: 30 Anthony Brown CB; 39 Brandon Carr CB; 42 Barry Church SS; 24 Morris Claiborne CB; 36 Arjen Colquhoun CB; 35 Kavon Frazier SS/FS; 23 Isaiah Frey FS/CB; 38 Jeff Heath FS/SS; 31 Byron Jones FS; 37 Jeremiah McKinnon CB; 29 Deji Olatoye CB; 32 Orlando Scandrick CB; 28 Dax Swanson CB; 26 Josh Thomas CB; 27 J. J. Wilcox SS/FS; Special teams: 5 Dan Bailey K; 6 Chris Jones P; 91 L. P. Ladouceur LS; 2 Matt Wile P	Reserve lists: -- Darryl Baldwin T (IR); 96 Maliek Collins DT (Active/PUP); 25 Lance Dunbar RB (Active/PUP); 94 Randy Gregory DE (Did Not Report); 84 James Hanna TE (Active/PUP); 93 Benson Mayowa DE (Active/PUP); 55 Rolando McClain MLB (Did Not Report); 20 Darren McFadden RB (Active/NF-Inj.); 43 Rolan Milligan FS (IR); 54 Jaylon Smith MLB (Active/NF-Inj.); 57 Damien Wilson OLB/MLB (Active/NF-Inj.); 90 active, 4 inactive

=== Week one roster ===
Dallas Cowboys 2016 week one roster
Quarterbacks: 4 Dak Prescott; 9 Tony Romo; 3 Mark Sanchez; Running backs: 25 Lance Dunbar; 21 Ezekiel Elliott; 34 Darius Jackson; 46 Alfred Morris; 41 Keith Smith FB/OLB; 45 Rod Smith FB/RB; Wide receivers: 11 Cole Beasley; 88 Dez Bryant; 19 Brice Butler; 13 Lucky Whitehead; 83 Terrance Williams; Tight ends: 89 Gavin Escobar; 87 Geoff Swaim; 82 Jason Witten	Offensive linemen: 71 La'el Collins G; 72 Travis Frederick C; 68 Doug Free T; 79 Chaz Green T; 65 Ronald Leary G; 73 Joe Looney C/G; 70 Zack Martin G; 77 Tyron Smith T; Defensive linemen: 96 Maliek Collins DT; 58 Jack Crawford DT/DE; 98 Tyrone Crawford DT; 95 David Irving DE/DT; 93 Benson Mayowa DE; 97 Terrell McClain DT; 99 Charles Tapper DE; 92 Cedric Thornton DT	Linebackers: 56 Justin Durant OLB/MLB; 52 Andrew Gachkar OLB/MLB; 59 Anthony Hitchens MLB/OLB; 50 Sean Lee OLB; 53 Mark Nzeocha MLB/OLB; 51 Kyle Wilber OLB/DE; 57 Damien Wilson OLB; Defensive backs: 30 Anthony Brown CB; 39 Brandon Carr CB; 42 Barry Church SS; 24 Morris Claiborne CB; 35 Kavon Frazier SS/FS; 38 Jeff Heath FS/SS; 31 Byron Jones FS; 32 Orlando Scandrick CB; 23 Dax Swanson CB; 27 J. J. Wilcox SS/FS; Special teams: 5 Dan Bailey K; 6 Chris Jones P; 91 L. P. Ladouceur LS	Reserve lists: -- Darryl Baldwin T (IR); 10 Chris Brown WR (IR); 94 Randy Gregory DE (Did Not Report); 84 James Hanna TE (PUP); 90 DeMarcus Lawrence DE (Susp.); 66 Mike McAdoo DE (IR); 55 Rolando McClain MLB (Did Not Report); 20 Darren McFadden RB (NF-Inj.); 17 Kellen Moore QB (IR); -- James Morris MLB (IR); 54 Jaylon Smith MLB (NF-Inj.); 26 Josh Thomas CB (IR); Practice squad: 60 Jake Brendel C/G; 80 Rico Gathers TE; 48 Jeremiah George OLB; 81 Andy Jones WR; 16 Vince Mayle WR; 40 Chris McCain DE/OLB; 78 Keavon Milton T; 76 Zach Moore DE; 7 Jameill Showers QB; 86 Austin Traylor TE; 53 active, 12 inactive, 10 practice squad

=== Final roster ===
Dallas Cowboys 2016 final roster
Quarterbacks: 4 Dak Prescott; 9 Tony Romo; 3 Mark Sanchez; Running backs: 25 Lance Dunbar; 21 Ezekiel Elliott; 20 Darren McFadden; 46 Alfred Morris; 41 Keith Smith FB; Wide receivers: 11 Cole Beasley; 88 Dez Bryant; 19 Brice Butler; 13 Lucky Whitehead; 83 Terrance Williams; Tight ends: 89 Gavin Escobar; 82 Jason Witten	Offensive linemen: 63 Emmett Cleary T; 72 Travis Frederick C; 68 Doug Free T; 65 Ronald Leary G; 73 Joe Looney G; 70 Zack Martin G; 62 Ryan Seymour G; 77 Tyron Smith T; Defensive linemen: 76 Richard Ash DT; 96 Maliek Collins DT; 58 Jack Crawford DE; 98 Tyrone Crawford DE/DT; 94 Randy Gregory DE; 95 David Irving DT/DE; 90 DeMarcus Lawrence DE; 93 Benson Mayowa DE; 97 Terrell McClain DT; 92 Cedric Thornton DT	Linebackers: 56 Justin Durant OLB; 52 Andrew Gachkar OLB; 59 Anthony Hitchens MLB; 50 Sean Lee OLB; 53 Mark Nzeocha MLB; 51 Kyle Wilber OLB; 57 Damien Wilson OLB; Defensive backs: 30 Anthony Brown CB; 39 Brandon Carr CB; 42 Barry Church SS; 24 Morris Claiborne CB; 35 Kavon Frazier SS; 38 Jeff Heath FS; 31 Byron Jones FS; 23 Leon McFadden CB; 32 Orlando Scandrick CB; 27 J. J. Wilcox SS; Special teams: 5 Dan Bailey K; 6 Chris Jones P; 91 L. P. Ladouceur LS	Reserve lists: 72 Darryl Baldwin T (IR); 10 Chris Brown WR (IR); 71 La'el Collins G (IR); 75 Ryan Davis DE (IR); 79 Chaz Green T (IR); 84 James Hanna TE (PUP); 17 Kellen Moore QB (IR); 40 James Morris MLB (IR); 54 Jaylon Smith MLB (IR); 87 Geoff Swaim TE (IR); 99 Charles Tapper DE (IR); 26 Josh Thomas CB (NF-Inj.); Practice squad: 67 Clay DeBord T; 78 Kadeem Edwards G; 80 Rico Gathers TE; 48 Jeremiah George OLB; 66 Shelby Harris DT; 81 Andy Jones WR; 29 Sammy Seamster CB; 28 Jameill Showers SS; 45 Rod Smith FB; 53 active, 12 inactive, 9 practice squad

== Preseason ==
Week	Date	Opponent	Result	Record	Game site	NFL.com recap
1	August 13	at Los Angeles Rams	L 24–28	0–1	Los Angeles Memorial Coliseum	Recap
2	August 19	Miami Dolphins	W 41–14	1–1	AT&T Stadium	Recap
3	August 25	at Seattle Seahawks	L 17–27	1–2	CenturyLink Field	Recap
4	September 1	Houston Texans	L 17–28	1–3	AT&T Stadium	Recap

== Regular season ==
=== Schedule ===
Week	Date	Opponent	Result	Record	Game site	NFL.com recap
1	September 11	**New York Giants**	**L** 19–20	0–1	AT&T Stadium	Recap
2	September 18	at **Washington Redskins**	**W** 27–23	1–1	FedExField	Recap
3	September 25	Chicago Bears	**W** 31–17	2–1	AT&T Stadium	Recap
4	October 2	at San Francisco 49ers	**W** 24–17	3–1	Levi's Stadium	Recap
5	October 9	Cincinnati Bengals	**W** 28–14	4–1	AT&T Stadium	Recap
6	October 16	at Green Bay Packers	**W** 30–16	5–1	Lambeau Field	Recap
7	Bye					
8	October 30	**Philadelphia Eagles**	**W** 29–23 (OT)	6–1	AT&T Stadium	Recap
9	November 6	at Cleveland Browns	**W** 35–10	7–1	FirstEnergy Stadium	Recap
10	November 13	at Pittsburgh Steelers	**W** 35–30	8–1	Heinz Field	Recap
11	November 20	Baltimore Ravens	**W** 27–17	9–1	AT&T Stadium	Recap
12	November 24	**Washington Redskins**	**W** 31–26	10–1	AT&T Stadium	Recap
13	December 1	at Minnesota Vikings	**W** 17–15	11–1	U.S. Bank Stadium	Recap
14	December 11	at **New York Giants**	**L** 7–10	11–2	MetLife Stadium	Recap
15	December 18	Tampa Bay Buccaneers	**W** 26–20	12–2	AT&T Stadium	Recap
16	December 26	Detroit Lions	**W** 42–21	13–2	AT&T Stadium	Recap
17	January 1	at **Philadelphia Eagles**	**L** 13–27	13–3	Lincoln Financial Field	Recap

Note: Intra-division opponents are in bold text.

=== Game summaries ===
==== Week 1: vs. New York Giants ====
Week One: New York Giants at Dallas Cowboys – Game summary

Quarter	1	2	3	4	Total
**Giants**	0	13	0	7	**20**
Cowboys	3	6	7	3	**19**

at AT&T Stadium, Arlington, Texas

- Date: September 11
- Game time: 3:25 p.m. CDT
- Game weather: Played indoors (retractable roof closed)
- Game attendance: 92,867
- Referee: Ronald Torbert
- TV announcers (Fox): Joe Buck, Troy Aikman and Erin Andrews
- Recap, Gamebook

Game information

**First quarter**

- DAL – Dan Bailey 23-yard field goal, 6:35. Cowboys 3–0. **Drive: 15 plays, 70 yards, 8:25.**

**Second quarter**

- DAL – Dan Bailey 56-yard field goal, 11:09. Cowboys 6–0. **Drive: 15 plays, 52 yards, 7:58.**
- NYG – Larry Donnell 15-yard pass from Eli Manning (Randy Bullock kick), 9:36. Giants 7–6. **Drive: 4 plays, 75 yards, 1:33.**
- DAL – Dan Bailey 25-yard field goal, 4:02. Cowboys 9–7. **Drive: 11 plays, 68 yards, 5:34.**
- NYG – Sterling Shepard 9-yard pass from Eli Manning (kick failed, wide left), 0:07. Giants 13–9. **Drive: 12 plays, 75 yards, 3:55.**

**Third quarter**

- DAL – Ezekiel Elliott 8-yard run (Dan Bailey kick), 10:47. Cowboys 16–13. **Drive: 7 plays, 35 yards, 3:27.**

**Fourth quarter**

- DAL – Dan Bailey 54-yard field goal, 13:59. Cowboys 19–13. **Drive: 11 plays, 39 yards, 5:01.**
- NYG – Victor Cruz 3-yard pass from Eli Manning (Randy Bullock kick), 6:13. Giants 20–19. **Drive: 9 plays, 54 yards, 3:59.**

**Top passers**

- NYG – Eli Manning – 19/28, 207 yards, 3 TD, INT
- DAL – Dak Prescott – 25/45, 227 yards

**Top rushers**

- NYG – Rashad Jennings – 18 carries, 75 yards
- DAL – Ezekiel Elliott – 20 carries, 51 yards, TD

**Top receivers**

- NYG – Odell Beckham Jr. – 4 receptions, 73 yards
- DAL – Jason Witten – 9 receptions, 66 yards

The Cowboys fell short trying to win their home opener against the Giants in a hard-fought game. They dropped to 0–1 and lost to the Giants at AT&T Stadium for the first time since 2012.

Ezekiel Elliott struggled to find holes all game, but managed to record his first NFL touchdown. The Dallas defense failed to contain the Giants' rushing attack. The game also saw the return of Victor Cruz, who caught the game-clinching touchdown pass from Eli Manning.

Dallas' final play, a 14-yard catch-and-run by Terrance Williams, put them in field goal range, but he stayed inbounds and time expired.

==== Week 2: at Washington Redskins ====
Week Two: Dallas Cowboys at Washington Redskins – Game summary

Quarter	1	2	3	4	Total
**Cowboys**	10	3	7	7	**27**
Redskins	0	10	13	0	**23**

at FedExField, Landover, Maryland

- Date: September 18
- Game time: 1:00 p.m. EDT/12:00 pm. CDT
- Game weather: 81 °F (27 °C), sunny
- Game attendance: 80,612
- Referee: Bill Vinovich
- TV announcers (Fox): Kevin Burkhardt, John Lynch and Pam Oliver
- Recap, Gamebook

Game information

**First quarter**

- DAL – Dan Bailey 22-yard field goal, 9:25. Cowboys 3–0. **Drive: 13 plays, 76 yards, 5:35.**
- DAL – Ezekiel Elliott 1-yard run (Dan Bailey kick), 1:39. Cowboys 10–0. **Drive: 9 plays, 94 yards, 5:13.**

**Second quarter**

- WAS – Matt Jones 14-yard run (Dustin Hopkins kick), 13:08. Cowboys 10–7. **Drive: 8 plays, 75 yards, 3:31.**
- DAL – Dan Bailey 31-yard field goal, 4:34. Cowboys 13–7. **Drive: 10 plays, 43 yards, 4:31.**
- WAS – Dustin Hopkins 36-yard field goal, 0:26. Cowboys 13–10. **Drive: 12 plays, 56 yards, 4:08.**

**Third quarter**

- WAS – Jamison Crowder 11-yard pass from Kirk Cousins (Dustin Hopkins kick), 11:16. Redskins 17–13. **Drive: 8 plays, 75 yards, 3:44.**
- DAL – Dak Prescott 6-yard run (Dan Bailey kick), 5:41. Cowboys 20–17. **Drive: 10 plays, 75 yards, 5:35.**
- WAS – Dustin Hopkins 29-yard field goal, 2:06. Tied 20–20. **Drive: 7 plays, 27 yards, 3:35.**
- WAS – Dustin Hopkins 22-yard field goal, 0:04. Redskins 23–20. **Drive: 5 plays, 30 yards, 1:35.**

**Fourth quarter**

- DAL – Alfred Morris 4-yard run (Dan Bailey kick), 4:45. Cowboys 27–23. **Drive: 11 plays, 80 yards, 5:50.**

**Top passers**

- DAL – Dak Prescott – 22/30, 292 yards
- WAS – Kirk Cousins – 28/46, 364 yards, TD, INT

**Top rushers**

- DAL – Ezekiel Elliott – 21 rushes, 83 yards, TD
- WAS – Matt Jones – 13 rushes, 61 yards, TD

**Top receivers**

- DAL – Dez Bryant – 7 receptions, 102 yards
- WAS – Jordan Reed – 5 receptions, 70 yards

Rookie quarterback Dak Prescott was impressive in his second NFL start, rushing for a touchdown and playing mistake-free football as Dallas evened its record at 1–1 with a win over its long-time rival.

Barry Church's interception of Kirk Cousins in the end zone late in the fourth quarter sealed the game.

==== Week 3: vs. Chicago Bears ====
Week Three: Chicago Bears at Dallas Cowboys – Game summary

Quarter	1	2	3	4	Total
Bears	0	3	7	7	**17**
**Cowboys**	10	14	0	7	**31**

at AT&T Stadium, Arlington, Texas

- Date: September 25
- Game time: 7:30 pm. CDT
- Game weather: Played indoors (retractable roof closed)
- Game attendance: 90,554
- Referee: Craig Wrolstad
- TV announcers (NBC): Al Michaels, Cris Collinsworth and Michele Tafoya
- Recap, Gamebook

Game information

**First quarter**

- DAL – Dak Prescott 1-yard run (Dan Bailey kick), 9:30. Cowboys 7–0. **Drive: 10 plays, 75 yards, 5:30.**
- DAL – Dan Bailey 49-yard field goal, 1:54. Cowboys 10–0. **Drive: 9 plays, 44 yards, 4:59.**

**Second quarter**

- DAL – Lance Dunbar 1-yard run (Dan Bailey kick), 11:11. Cowboys 17–0. **Drive: 9 plays, 72 yards, 4:09.**
- CHI – Connor Barth 34-yard field goal, 7:47. Cowboys 17–3. **Drive: 7 plays, 59 yards, 3:24.**
- DAL – Alfred Morris 3-yard run (Dan Bailey kick), 0:38. Cowboys 24–3. **Drive: 12 plays, 73 yard, 7:09.**

**Third quarter**

- CHI – Zach Miller 2-yard pass from Brian Hoyer (Connor Barth kick), 7:08. Cowboys 24–10. **Drive: 11 plays, 63 yards, 4:54.**

**Fourth quarter**

- DAL – Dez Bryant 17-yard pass from Dak Prescott (Dan Bailey kick), 9:02. Cowboys 31–10. **Drive: 10 plays, 88 yards, 6:35.**
- CHI – Zach Miller 6-yard pass from Brian Hoyer (Connor Barth kick), 6:28. Cowboys 31–17. **Drive: 8 plays, 75 yards, 2:34.**

**Top passers**

- CHI – Brian Hoyer – 30/49, 317 yards, 2 TD
- DAL – Dak Prescott – 19/24, 248 yards, TD

**Top rushers**

- CHI – Jordan Howard – 9 rushes, 45 yards
- DAL – Ezekiel Elliott – 30 rushes, 140 yards

**Top receivers**

- CHI – Zach Miller – 8 receptions, 78 yards, 2 TD
- DAL – Cole Beasley – 7 receptions, 73 yards

Dallas won its first home game in over a year as it dispatched of the Bears, who were without normal starting quarterback Jay Cutler and instead started Brian Hoyer. Ezekiel Elliott ran for 140 yards on 30 carries in just his third NFL game and Dak Prescott threw his first NFL touchdown pass to Dez Bryant.

==== Week 4: at San Francisco 49ers ====
Week Four: Dallas Cowboys at San Francisco 49ers – Game summary

Quarter	1	2	3	4	Total
**Cowboys**	0	14	7	3	**24**
49ers	7	7	3	0	**17**

at Levi's Stadium, Santa Clara, California

- Date: October 2
- Game time: 3:25 pm. CDT/1:25 p.m. PDT
- Game weather: 68 °F (20 °C), cloudy
- Game attendance: 70,178
- Referee: Terry McAulay
- TV announcers (Fox): Joe Buck, Troy Aikman and Erin Andrews
- Recap, Gamebook

Game information

**First quarter**

- SF – Jeremy Kerley 33-yard pass from Blaine Gabbert (Phil Dawson kick), 6:41. 49ers 7–0. **Drive: 9 plays, 63 yards, 3:39.**

**Second quarter**

- SF – Carlos Hyde 3-yard run (Phil Dawson kick), 13:55. 49ers 14–0. **Drive: 12 plays, 80 yards, 5:03.**
- DAL – Terrance Williams 20-yard pass from Dak Prescott (Dan Bailey kick), 2:58. 49ers 14–7. **Drive: 8 plays, 66 yards, 3:54.**
- DAL – Brice Butler 4-yard pass from Dak Prescott (Dan Bailey kick), 0:12. Tied 14–14. **Drive: 11 plays, 58 yards, 1:38.**

**Third quarter**

- SF – Phil Dawson 36-yard field goal, 12:18. 49ers 17–14. **Drive: 6 plays, 57 yards, 2:42.**
- DAL – Ezekiel Elliott 1-yard run (Dan Bailey kick), 1:08. Cowboys 21–17. **Drive: 10 plays, 78 yards, 5:49.**

**Fourth quarter**

- DAL – Dan Bailey 22-yard field goal, 4:11. Cowboys 24–17. **Drive: 11 plays, 62 yards, 6:27.**

**Top passers**

- DAL – Dak Prescott – 23/32, 245 yards, 2 TD
- SF – Blaine Gabbert – 16/23, 196 yards, TD, INT

**Top rushers**

- DAL – Ezekiel Elliott – 23 rushes, 138 yards, TD
- SF – Carlos Hyde – 15 rushes, 74 yards, TD

**Top receivers**

- DAL – Cole Beasley – 3 receptions, 66 yards
- SF – Jeremy Kerley – 6 receptions, 88 yards, TD

The Cowboys rallied from an early 14-point hole to win over the 49ers on the road, winning their third straight game in the process. Ezekiel Elliott went over the century mark again, rushing for 138 yards and a touchdown.

==== Week 5: vs. Cincinnati Bengals ====
Week Five: Cincinnati Bengals at Dallas Cowboys – Game summary

Quarter	1	2	3	4	Total
Bengals	0	0	0	14	**14**
**Cowboys**	7	14	7	0	**28**

at AT&T Stadium, Arlington, Texas

- Date: October 9
- Game time: 3:25 pm. CDT
- Game weather: Played indoors (retractable roof closed)
- Game attendance: 91,653
- Referee: Tony Corrente
- TV announcers (CBS): Jim Nantz, Phil Simms and Tracy Wolfson
- Recap, Gamebook

Game information

**First quarter**

- DAL – Ezekiel Elliott 13-yard run (Dan Bailey kick), 11:09. Cowboys 7–0. **Drive: 7 plays, 64 yards, 3:51.**

**Second quarter**

- DAL – Dak Prescott 5-yard run (Dan Bailey kick), 14:43. Cowboys 14–0. **Drive: 11 plays, 89 yards, 6:33.**
- DAL – Cole Beasley 14-yard pass from Dak Prescott (Dan Bailey kick), 4:09. Cowboys 21–0. **Drive: 8 plays, 80 yards, 3:38.**

**Third quarter**

- DAL – Ezekiel Elliott 60-yard run (Dan Bailey kick), 11:38. Cowboys 28–0. **Drive: 1 play, 60 yards, 0:09.**

**Fourth quarter**

- CIN – Brandon LaFell 7-yard pass from Andy Dalton (Mike Nugent kick), 10:10. Cowboys 28–7. **Drive: 10 plays, 59 yards, 5:13.**
- CIN – Brandon LaFell 5-yard pass from Andy Dalton (Mike Nugent kick), 2:39. Cowboys 28–14. **Drive: 12 plays, 77 yards, 5:03.**

**Top passers**

- CIN – Andy Dalton – 29/41, 269 yards, 2 TD
- DAL – Dak Prescott – 18/24, 227 yards, TD

**Top rushers**

- CIN – Giovani Bernard – 9 rushes, 50 yards
- DAL – Ezekiel Elliott – 15 rushes, 134 yards, 2 TD

**Top receivers**

- CIN – Brandon LaFell – 8 receptions, 68 yards, 2 TD
- DAL – Terrance Williams – 5 receptions, 70 yards

Dak Prescott extended his consecutive passes to begin a career without an interception streak to 155, trailing only Tom Brady all-time. Ezekiel Elliott rushed for 134 yards on only 15 carries, including a 60-yard touchdown run. The win put Dallas a half-game ahead of the Eagles for first place in the NFC East.

==== Week 6: at Green Bay Packers ====
Week Six: Dallas Cowboys at Green Bay Packers – Game summary

Quarter	1	2	3	4	Total
**Cowboys**	7	10	3	10	**30**
Packers	3	3	0	10	**16**

at Lambeau Field, Green Bay, Wisconsin

- Date: October 16
- Game time: 3:25 pm. CDT
- Game weather: 69 °F (21 °C), clear
- Game attendance: 78,481
- Referee: Brad Allen
- TV announcers (Fox): Thom Brennaman, Troy Aikman and Erin Andrews
- Recap, Gamebook

Game information

**First quarter**

- DAL – Cole Beasley 1-yard pass from Dak Prescott (Dan Bailey kick), 10:08. Cowboys 7–0. **Drive: 8 plays, 75 yards, 4:57.**
- GB – Mason Crosby 37-yard field goal, 5:14. Cowboys 7–3. **Drive: 9 plays, 56 yards, 4:52.**

**Second quarter**

- GB – Mason Crosby 43-yard field goal, 12:19. Cowboys 7–6. **Drive: 9 plays, 45 yards, 4:08.**
- DAL – Dan Bailey 44-yard field goal, 6:05. Cowboys 10–6. **Drive: 12 plays, 50 yards, 6:15.**
- DAL – Brice Butler 20-yard pass from Dak Prescott (Dan Bailey kick), 0:31. Cowboys 17–6. **Drive: 5 plays, 97 yards, 0:33.**

**Third quarter**

- DAL – Dan Bailey 22-yard field goal, 7:02. Cowboys 20–6. **Drive: 7 plays, 47 yards, 3:05.**

**Fourth quarter**

- GB – Mason Crosby 34-yard field goal, 14:51. Cowboys 20–9. **Drive: 4 plays, 0 yards, 0:32.**
- DAL – Cole Beasley 4-yard pass from Dak Prescott (Dan Bailey kick), 10:31. Cowboys 27–9. **Drive: 7 plays, 75 yards, 4:22.**
- GB – Randall Cobb 4-yard pass from Aaron Rodgers (Mason Crosby kick), 6:57. Cowboys 27–16. **Drive: 9 plays, 75 yards, 3:33.**
- DAL – Dan Bailey 32-yard field goal, 3:45. Cowboys 30–16. **Drive: 8 plays, 48 yards, 3:12.**

**Top passers**

- DAL – Dak Prescott – 18/27, 247 yards, 3 TD, INT
- GB – Aaron Rodgers – 31/42, 294 yards, TD, INT

**Top rushers**

- DAL – Ezekiel Elliott – 28 rushes, 157 yards
- GB – Eddie Lacy – 17 rushes, 65 yards

**Top receivers**

- DAL – Terrance Williams – 4 rec, 75 yards
- GB – Ty Montgomery – 10 rec, 98 yards

It was the third straight year that the Cowboys traveled to Lambeau Field to face the Packers. Despite Dak Prescott being picked off for the first time this season, he still managed 247 passing yards and three touchdowns. He also passed Tom Brady's all-time record of consecutive pass attempts to start a career without an interception.

Ezekiel Elliott pounded the Green Bay Packers number one ranked run defense with 157 yards on 28 carries.

The Dallas defense dominated the Packers, forcing four Green Bay turnovers. It was the first time since 2008, and second time in franchise history that the Cowboys had won at Lambeau Field. With the 30–16 victory, the Cowboys went 5–1 heading into the bye week.

==== Week 8: vs. Philadelphia Eagles ====
Week Eight: Philadelphia Eagles at Dallas Cowboys – Game summary

Quarter	1	2	3	4	OT	Total
Eagles	3	10	7	3	0	**23**
**Cowboys**	7	3	3	10	6	**29**

at AT&T Stadium, Arlington, Texas

- Date: October 30
- Game time: 8:30 pm. CDT/7:30 pm. CDT
- Game weather: 84 °F (29 °C), clear skies – retractable roof open
- Game attendance: 93,103
- Referee: Jerome Boger
- TV announcers (NBC): Al Michaels, Cris Collinsworth and Michele Tafoya
- Recap, Gamebook

Game information

**First quarter**

- PHI – Caleb Sturgis 30-yard field goal, 6:39. Eagles 3–0. **Drive: 10 plays, 50 yards, 5:11.**
- DAL – Dak Prescott 7-yard run (Dan Bailey kick), 4:41. Cowboys 7–3. **Drive: 5 plays, 75 yards, 1:58.**

**Second quarter**

- DAL – Dan Bailey 38-yard field goal, 14:50. Cowboys 10–3. **Drive: 8 plays, 52 yards, 3:20.**
- PHI – Ryan Mathews 1-yard run (Caleb Sturgis kick), 3:45. Tied 10–10. **Drive: 9 plays, 45 yards, 5:05.**
- PHI – Caleb Sturgis 55-yard field goal, 0:00. Eagles 13–10. **Drive: 8 plays, 43 yards, 1:26.**

**Third quarter**

- PHI – Jordan Matthews 5-yard pass from Carson Wentz (Caleb Sturgis kick), 6:20. Eagles 20–10. **Drive: 12 plays, 69 yards, 4:10.**
- DAL – Dan Bailey 23-yard field goal, 0:56. Eagles 20–13. **Drive: 12 plays, 70 yards, 5:24.**

**Fourth quarter**

- PHI – Caleb Sturgis 34-yard field goal, 14:09. Eagles 23–13. **Drive: 6 plays, 29 yards, 1:47.**
- DAL – Dan Bailey 49-yard field goal, 11:34. Eagles 23–16. **Drive: 4 plays, 5 yards, 1:24.**
- DAL – Dez Bryant 22-yard pass from Dak Prescott (Dan Bailey kick), 3:04. Tied 23–23. **Drive: 11 plays, 90 yards, 3:22.**

**Overtime**

- DAL – Jason Witten 5-yard pass from Dak Prescott, 7:48. Cowboys 29–23. **Drive: 12 plays, 75 yards, 7:12.**

**Top passers**

- PHI – Carson Wentz – 32/43, 202 yards, TD
- DAL – Dak Prescott – 19/39, 287 yards, 2 TD, INT

**Top rushers**

- PHI – Darren Sproles – 15 rushes, 86 yards
- DAL – Ezekiel Elliott – 22 rushes, 96 yards

**Top receivers**

- PHI – Jordan Matthews – 11 receptions, 65 yards, TD
- DAL – Dez Bryant – 4 receptions, 113 yards, TD

Hoping to continue their winning streak, the Cowboys hosted the Philadelphia Eagles in a primetime matchup duel between Dak Prescott and Carson Wentz. Jason Witten's touchdown in overtime sealed the victory for the Cowboys, who went 6–1; this was the Cowboys' first victory against the Eagles at AT&T Stadium since 2012.

==== Week 9: at Cleveland Browns ====
Week Nine: Dallas Cowboys at Cleveland Browns – Game summary

Quarter	1	2	3	4	Total
**Cowboys**	7	14	14	0	**35**
Browns	3	7	0	0	**10**

at FirstEnergy Stadium, Cleveland, Ohio

- Date: November 6
- Game time: 1:00 pm. EST/12:00 pm. CST
- Game weather: 58 °F (14 °C), clear
- Game attendance: 67,431
- Referee: Jeff Triplette
- TV announcers (Fox): Thom Brennaman, Charles Davis, Chris Spielman and Peter Schrager
- Recap, Gamebook

Game information

**First quarter**

- CLE – Cody Parkey 31-yard field goal, 12:40. Browns 3–0. **Drive: 6 plays, 62 yards, 2:20.**
- DAL – Jason Witten 26-yard pass from Dak Prescott (Dan Bailey kick), 6:47. Cowboys 7–3. **Drive: 10 plays, 75 yards, 5:53.**

**Second quarter**

- DAL – Ezekiel Elliott 10-yard run (Dan Bailey kick), 10:02. Cowboys 14–3. **Drive: 9 plays, 69 yards, 4:48.**
- DAL – Cole Beasley 6-yard pass from Dak Prescott (Dan Bailey kick), 1:50. Cowboys 21–3. **Drive: 9 plays, 67 yards, 4:39.**
- CLE – Terrelle Pryor 12-yard pass from Cody Kessler (Cody Parkey kick), 0:23. Cowboys 21–10. **Drive: 7 plays, 80 yards, 1:27.**

**Third quarter**

- DAL – Ezekiel Elliott 8-yard run (Dan Bailey kick), 11:30. Cowboys 28–10. **Drive: 7 plays, 75 yards, 3:30.**
- DAL – Gavin Escobar 2-yard pass from Dak Prescott (Dan Bailey kick), 1:41. Cowboys 35–10. **Drive: 9 plays, 64 yards, 5:30.**

**Fourth quarter**

- No scoring plays

**Top passers**

- DAL – Dak Prescott – 21/27, 247 yards, 3 TD
- CLE – Cody Kessler – 19/27, 203 yards, TD

**Top rushers**

- DAL – Ezekiel Elliott – 18 rushes, 92 yards, 2 TD
- CLE – Duke Johnson – 5 rushes, 30 yards

**Top receivers**

- DAL – Jason Witten – 8 receptions, 134 yards, TD
- CLE – Isaiah Crowell – 4 receptions, 63 yards

The winless Browns had no answer for Dak Prescott who threw three touchdown passes in a 35–10 win and improving the Cowboys to 7–1 for the first time since 2007.

==== Week 10: at Pittsburgh Steelers ====
Week Ten: Dallas Cowboys at Pittsburgh Steelers – Game summary

Quarter	1	2	3	4	Total
**Cowboys**	10	3	10	12	**35**
Steelers	12	3	3	12	**30**

at Heinz Field, Pittsburgh, Pennsylvania

- Date: November 13
- Game time: 4:25 pm. EST/3:25 pm. CST
- Game weather: 56 °F (13 °C), clear
- Game attendance: 67,737
- Referee: Clete Blakeman
- TV announcers (Fox): Joe Buck, Troy Aikman and Erin Andrews
- Recap, Gamebook

Game information

**First quarter**

- PIT – Le'Veon Bell 2-yard pass from Ben Roethlisberger (pass failed), 9:54. Steelers 6–0. **Drive: 8 plays, 38 yards, 3:51.**
- DAL – Dan Bailey 37-yard field goal, 5:17. Steelers 6–3. **Drive: 10 plays, 42 yards, 4:37.**
- PIT – Eli Rogers 3-yard pass from Ben Roethlisberger (pass failed), 1:13. Steelers 12–3. **Drive: 8 plays, 75 yards, 4:04.**
- DAL – Ezekiel Elliott 83-yard pass from Dak Prescott (Dan Bailey kick), 0:12. Steelers 12–10. **Drive: 2 plays, 75 yards, 1:01.**

**Second quarter**

- DAL – Dan Bailey 53-yard field goal, 11:04. Cowboys 13–12. **Drive: 6 plays, 25 yards, 3:24.**
- PIT – Chris Boswell 39-yard field goal, 4:43. Steelers 15–13. **Drive: 10 plays, 54 yards, 6:21.**

**Third quarter**

- PIT – Chris Boswell 25-yard field goal, 13:10. Steelers 18–13. **Drive: 7 plays, 68 yards, 1:50.**
- DAL – Dan Bailey 46-yard field goal, 5:35. Steelers 18–16. **Drive: 14 plays, 46 yards, 7:35.**
- DAL – Dez Bryant 50-yard pass from Dak Prescott (Dan Bailey kick), 1:35. Cowboys 23–18. **Drive: 3 plays, 49 yards, 1:48.**

**Fourth quarter**

- PIT – Le'Veon Bell 1-yard run (pass failed), 7:51. Steelers 24–23. **Drive: 6 plays, 46 yards, 3:05.**
- DAL – Ezekiel Elliott 14-yard run (pass failed), 1:55. Cowboys 29–24. **Drive: 10 plays, 75 yards, 5:56.**
- PIT – Antonio Brown 15-yard pass from Ben Roethlisberger (pass failed), 0:42. Steelers 30–29. **Drive: 5 plays, 75 yards, 1:13.**
- DAL – Ezekiel Elliott 32-yard run (pass failed), 0:09. Cowboys 35–30. **Drive: 5 plays, 75 yards, 0:33.**

**Top passers**

- DAL – Dak Prescott – 22/32, 319 yards, 2 TD
- PIT – Ben Roethlisberger – 37/46, 408 yards, 3 TD

**Top rushers**

- DAL – Ezekiel Elliott – 21 rushes, 114 yards, 2 TD
- PIT – Le'Veon Bell – 17 rushes, 57 yards, TD

**Top receivers**

- DAL – Dez Bryant – 6 receptions, 116 yards, TD
- PIT – Antonio Brown – 14 receptions, 154 yards, TD

A classic rivalry since the 1970s, the Cowboys traveled to Pittsburgh to take on the Steelers, who were coming off a three-game losing streak (including a loss to the Baltimore Ravens the previous week). With the win, the Cowboys extended their winning streak to eight games for the first time since 1977. Ezekiel Elliott reached 1,000 yards in this game and rushed for the game-winning touchdown in the space of 30 seconds. The Cowboys also clinched a non-losing season as they had the best win–loss record in the NFL.

==== Week 11: vs. Baltimore Ravens ====
Week Eleven: Baltimore Ravens at Dallas Cowboys – Game summary

Quarter	1	2	3	4	Total
Ravens	7	3	0	7	**17**
**Cowboys**	0	10	7	10	**27**

at AT&T Stadium, Arlington, Texas

- Date: November 20
- Game time: 12:00 pm. CST
- Game weather: Played indoors (retractable roof closed)
- Game attendance: 93,056
- Referee: John Parry
- TV announcers (CBS): Ian Eagle, Dan Fouts and Evan Washburn
- Recap, Gamebook

Game information

**First quarter**

- BAL – Terrance West 18-yard run (Justin Tucker kick), 5:28. Ravens 7–0. **Drive: 6 plays, 90 yards, 3:09.**

**Second quarter**

- DAL – Cole Beasley 3-yard pass from Dak Prescott (Dan Bailey kick), 5:55. Tied 7–7. **Drive: 6 plays, 52 yards, 3:36.**
- BAL – Justin Tucker 46-yard field goal, 1:37. Ravens 10–7. **Drive: 9 plays, 47 yards, 4:18.**
- DAL – Dan Bailey 30-yard field goal, 0:04. Tied 10–10. **Drive: 8 plays, 63 yards, 1:33.**

**Third quarter**

- DAL – Dez Bryant 4-yard pass from Dak Prescott (Dan Bailey kick), 7:31. Cowboys 17–10. **Drive: 10 plays, 92 yards, 5:49.**

**Fourth quarter**

- DAL – Dez Bryant 13-yard pass from Dak Prescott (Dan Bailey kick), 11:30. Cowboys 24–10. **Drive: 13 plays, 88 yards, 7:54.**
- BAL – Steve Smith Sr. 5-yard pass from Joe Flacco (Justin Tucker kick), 8:16. Cowboys 24–17. **Drive: 8 plays, 75 yards, 3:14.**
- DAL – Dan Bailey 21-yard field goal, 1:50. Cowboys 27–17. **Drive: 13 plays, 72 yards, 6:26.**

**Top passers**

- BAL – Joe Flacco – 23/35, 269 yards, TD
- DAL – Dak Prescott – 27/36, 301 yards, 3 TD

**Top rushers**

- BAL – Terrance West – 8 rushes, 42 yards, TD
- DAL – Ezekiel Elliott – 25 rushes, 97 yards

**Top receivers**

- BAL – Steve Smith Sr. – 8 receptions, 99 yards, TD
- DAL – Dez Bryant – 6 receptions, 80 yards, 2 TD

The Cowboys returned home to take on the Baltimore Ravens. Ezekiel Elliott surpassed Tony Dorsett's record of 1,007 rushing yards as a rookie. With the win, the Cowboys extended their winning streak to nine games for the first time in the team's franchise history. The win also saw the Cowboys beat the Ravens for the very first time.

==== Week 12: vs. Washington Redskins ====
Thanksgiving Day game

Week Twelve: Washington Redskins at Dallas Cowboys – Game summary

Quarter	1	2	3	4	Total
Redskins	0	6	0	20	**26**
**Cowboys**	7	10	0	14	**31**

at AT&T Stadium, Arlington, Texas

- Date: November 24
- Game time: 3:30 pm. CST
- Game weather: Played indoors (retractable roof closed)
- Game attendance: 93,099
- Referee: Craig Wrolstad
- TV announcers (Fox): Joe Buck, Troy Aikman, Chris Myers and Erin Andrews
- Recap, Gamebook

Game information

**First quarter**

- DAL – Ezekiel Elliott 4-yard run(Dan Bailey kick), 11:09. Cowboys 7–0. **Drive: 7 plays, 75 yards, 3:51.**

**Second quarter**

- WAS – Dustin Hopkins 24-yard field goal, 14:04. Cowboys 7–3. **Drive: 10 plays, 75 yards, 4:10.**
- DAL – Dan Bailey 46-yard field goal, 7:57. Cowboys 10–3. **Drive: 12 plays, 47 yards, 6:07.**
- DAL – Terrance Williams 10-yard pass from Dak Prescott (Dan Bailey kick), 1:45. Cowboys 17–3. **Drive: 6 plays, 55 yards, 2:06.**
- WAS – Dustin Hopkins 20-yard field goal, 0:03. Cowboys 17–6. **Drive: 11 plays, 73 yards, 1:43.**

**Third quarter**

- None

**Fourth quarter**

- WAS – Jordan Reed 5-yard pass from Kirk Cousins (pass failed), 14:54. Cowboys 17–12. **Drive: 14 plays, 90 yards, 7:55.**
- DAL – Dak Prescott 6-yard run (Dan Bailey kick), 10:49. Cowboys 24–12. **Drive: 7 plays, 75 yards, 4:05.**
- WAS – DeSean Jackson 67-yard pass from Kirk Cousins (Dustin Hopkins kick), 9:22. Cowboys 24–19. **Drive: 3 plays, 75 yards, 1:27.**
- DAL – Ezekiel Elliott 1-yard run (Dan Bailey kick), 6:29. Cowboys 31–19. **Drive: 8 plays, 53 yards, 2:53.**
- WAS – Jordan Reed 8-yard pass from Kirk Cousins (Dustin Hopkins kick), 1:53. Cowboys 31–26. **Drive: 15 plays, 75 yards, 4:36.**

**Top passers**

- WAS – Kirk Cousins – 41/53, 449 yards, 3 TD
- DAL – Dak Prescott – 17/24, 195 yards, TD

**Top rushers**

- WAS – Robert Kelley – 14 rushes, 37 yards
- DAL – Ezekiel Elliott – 20 rushes, 97 yards, 2 TD

**Top receivers**

- WAS – DeSean Jackson – 4 receptions, 118 yards, TD
- DAL – Dez Bryant – 5 receptions, 72 yards

In the traditional Thanksgiving game, the Cowboys hosted the Washington Redskins, who had just came off a victory against the Green Bay Packers. In a game of catch-up, the Redskins never led; however, they made a valiant effort in the fourth quarter to take the lead. The Cowboys held them off and won the game, thus extending their winning streak to ten games for the first time in franchise history. This was also the first time since 2013 that the Cowboys would sweep the Redskins.

==== Week 13: at Minnesota Vikings ====
Week Thirteen: Dallas Cowboys at Minnesota Vikings – Game summary

Quarter	1	2	3	4	Total
**Cowboys**	0	7	0	10	**17**
Vikings	3	0	3	9	**15**

at U.S. Bank Stadium, Minneapolis, Minnesota

- Date: December 1
- Game time: 7:25 pm. CST
- Game weather: Played indoors (fixed-roof stadium)
- Game attendance: 66,860
- Referee: Tony Corrente
- TV announcers (NBC/NFLN/Twitter): Al Michaels, Cris Collinsworth and Heather Cox
- Recap, Gamebook

Game information

**First quarter**

- MIN – Kai Forbath 48-yard field goal, 2:28. Vikings 3–0. **Drive: 6 plays, 32 yards, 3:17.**

**Second quarter**

- DAL – Ezekiel Elliott 1-yard run (Dan Bailey kick), 5:29. Cowboys 7–3. **Drive: 8 plays, 84 yards, 5:12.**

**Third quarter**

- MIN – Kai Forbath 36-yard field goal, 2:10. Cowboys 7–6. **Drive: 10 plays, 49 yards, 4:52.**

**Fourth quarter**

- MIN – Kai Forbath 33-yard field goal, 14:11. Vikings 9–7. **Drive: 4 plays, 4 yards, 0:56.**
- DAL – Dez Bryant 8-yard pass from Dak Prescott (Dan Bailey kick), 10:22. Cowboys 14–9. **Drive: 1 play, 8 yards, 0:06.**
- DAL – Dan Bailey 39-yard field goal, 4:15. Cowboys 17–9. **Drive: 5 plays, 33 yards, 2:22.**
- MIN – Jerick McKinnon 3-yard pass from Sam Bradford (pass failed), 0:25. Cowboys 17–15. **Drive: 8 plays, 65 yards, 1:44.**

**Top passers**

- DAL – Dak Prescott – 12/18, 139 yards, TD
- MIN – Sam Bradford – 32/45, 247 yards, TD

**Top rushers**

- DAL – Ezekiel Elliott – 20 rushes, 86 yards, TD
- MIN – Jerick McKinnon – 9 rushes, 41 yards

**Top receivers**

- DAL – Dez Bryant – 4 receptions, 84 yards, TD
- MIN – Adam Thielen – 7 receptions, 86 yards

The Cowboys traveled to Minnesota to take on the struggling Vikings following their loss against the Detroit Lions on Thanksgiving. In a rather tightly contested game that saw penalties on Dallas and strong Vikings defense, the Cowboys nevertheless managed to win and thus extended their historical win streak to eleven games. This was also the first time since 1995 in which Dallas had won at Minnesota. With the win, plus a loss from the Washington Redskins against the Cardinals the following Sunday, Dallas became the first team in the NFL to clinch a playoff berth this season.

==== Week 14: at New York Giants ====
Week Fourteen: Dallas Cowboys at New York Giants – Game summary

Quarter	1	2	3	4	Total
Cowboys	7	0	0	0	**7**
**Giants**	0	0	10	0	**10**

at MetLife Stadium, East Rutherford, New Jersey

- Date: December 11
- Game time: 8:30 pm. EST/7:30 pm. CST
- Game weather: 32 °F (0 °C), cloudy
- Game attendance: 80,874
- Referee: Carl Cheffers
- TV announcers (NBC): Al Michaels, Cris Collinsworth and Michele Tafoya
- Rrcap, Gamebook

Game information

**First quarter**

- DAL – Terrance Williams 31-yard pass from Dak Prescott (Dan Bailey kick), 4:44. Cowboys 7–0. **Drive: 10 plays, 67 yards, 4:06.**

**Second quarter**

- No scoring plays

**Third quarter**

- NYG – Robbie Gould 39-yard field goal, 5:50. Cowboys 7–3. **Drive: 11 plays, 35 yards, 4:49.**
- NYG – Odell Beckham Jr. 61-yard pass from Eli Manning (Robbie Gould kick), 1:07. Giants 10–7. **Drive: 2 plays, 61 yards, 0:43.**

**Fourth quarter**

- No scoring plays

**Top passers**

- DAL – Dak Prescott – 17/37, 165 yards, TD, 2 INT
- NYG – Eli Manning – 17/28, 193 yards, TD, INT

**Top rushers**

- DAL – Ezekiel Elliott – 24 rushes, 107 yards
- NYG – Rashad Jennings – 15 rushes, 45 yards

**Top receivers**

- DAL – Terrance Williams – 5 receptions, 76 yards, TD
- NYG – Odell Beckham Jr. – 4 receptions, 94 yards, TD

Trying to win their 12th straight and avenge their Week 1 loss, the Cowboys took on the second place New York Giants in a Sunday night showdown. After taking a 7–0 lead on their second possession of the game, the Cowboys failed to score any more points for the rest of the game and lost 10–7, thus ending their 11-game winning streak. Dak Prescott had his first multiple-interception game and the Cowboys committed three turnovers. It was the first time that they were swept in the regular season by the Giants since the 2011 season.

==== Week 15: vs. Tampa Bay Buccaneers ====
Week Fifteen: Tampa Bay Buccaneers at Dallas Cowboys – Game summary

Quarter	1	2	3	4	Total
Buccaneers	3	3	14	0	**20**
**Cowboys**	0	17	0	9	**26**

at AT&T Stadium, Arlington, Texas

- Date: December 18
- Game time: 7:30 pm. CST
- Game weather: Played indoors (retractable roof closed)
- Game attendance: 93,101
- Referee: Terry McAulay
- TV announcers (NBC): Al Michaels, Cris Collinsworth and Michele Tafoya
- Recap, Gamebook

Game information

**First quarter**

- TB – Roberto Aguayo 25-yard field goal, 5:54. Buccaneers 3–0. **Drive: 9 plays, 47 yards, 3:52.**

**Second quarter**

- DAL – Dan Bailey 27-yard field goal, 14:56. Tied 3–3. **Drive: 11 plays, 65 yards, 5:58.**
- DAL – Ezekiel Elliott 2-yard run (Dan Bailey kick), 12:34. Cowboys 10–3. **Drive: 5 plays, 14 yards, 2:11.**
- DAL – Dak Prescott 2-yard run (Dan Bailey kick), 6:24. Cowboys 17–3. **Drive: 10 plays, 64 yards, 5:13.**
- TB – Roberto Aguayo 34-yard field goal, 1:52. Cowboys 17–6. **Drive: 11 plays, 59 yards, 4:32.**

**Third quarter**

- TB – Adam Humphries 42-yard pass from Jameis Winston (Roberto Aguayo kick), 11:44. Cowboys 17–13. **Drive: 8 plays, 75 yards, 3:16.**
- TB – Cameron Brate 10-yard pass from Jameis Winston (Roberto Aguayo kick), 4:12. Buccaneers 20–17. **Drive: 10 plays, 81 yards, 4:49.**

**Fourth quarter**

- DAL – Dan Bailey 40-yard field goal,13:31. Tied 20–20. **Drive: 10 plays, 58 yards, 5:41.**
- DAL – Dan Bailey 38-yard field goal, 9:35. Cowboys 23–20. **Drive: 4 plays, 2 yards, 2:14.**
- DAL – Dan Bailey 33-yard field goal, 2:58. Cowboys 26–20. **Drive: 8 plays, 81 yards, 3:57.**

**Top passers**

- TB – Jameis Winston – 17/35, 247 yards, 2 TD
- DAL – Dak Prescott – 32/36, 279 yards

**Top rushers**

- TB – Doug Martin – 16 rushes, 42 yards
- DAL – Ezekiel Elliott – 23 rushes, 159 yards, TD

**Top receivers**

- TB – Cameron Brate – 5 receptions, 73 yards, TD
- DAL – Dez Bryant – 8 receptions, 82 yards

Following their second loss to the Giants, the Cowboys returned to Arlington in a match against the Tampa Bay Buccaneers (who were coming off a five-game winning streak). Despite both teams sharing the lead from time and time again, the Cowboys were able to hold off the Buccaneers. With less than a minute remaining in the fourth quarter, Orlando Scandrick intercepted a pass from Buccaneers quarterback Jameis Winston (who fumbled earlier in the first half) and ended the game as a Cowboys victory.

Dallas' only other highlight came early in the second quarter when Ezekiel Elliott leapt onto the Salvation Army kettle after scoring a touchdown to lead Dallas 10–3. This celebration resulted in a 15-yard unsportsmanlike conduct penalty; however, the following day, the NFL decided to not fine Elliott for the celebration.

The Cowboys improved to 12–2, and with the Giants' loss to the Eagles the following Thursday night, they clinched the NFC East title and home field advantage throughout the playoffs.

==== Week 16: vs. Detroit Lions ====
Week Sixteen: Detroit Lions at Dallas Cowboys – Game summary

Quarter	1	2	3	4	Total
Lions	7	14	0	0	**21**
**Cowboys**	14	7	14	7	**42**

at AT&T Stadium, Arlington, Texas

- Date: December 26
- Game time: 7:30 pm. CST
- Game weather: Played indoors (retractable roof closed)
- Game attendance: 92,885
- Referee: John Hussey
- TV announcers (ESPN): Sean McDonough, Jon Gruden and Lisa Salters
- Recap, Gamebook

Game information

**First quarter**

- DAL – Brice Butler 21-yard pass from Dak Prescott (Dan Bailey Kick), 9:57. Cowboys 7–0. **Drive: 9 plays, 66 yards, 5:03.**
- DET – Zach Zenner 7-yard run (Matt Prater Kick), 5:23. Tied 7–7. **Drive: 9 plays, 75 yards, 4:34.**
- DAL – Ezekiel Elliott 55-yard run (Dan Bailey Kick), 2:49. Cowboys 14–7. **Drive: 4 plays, 66 yards, 2:34.**

**Second quarter**

- DET – Matthew Stafford 1-yard run (Matt Prater Kick), 13:32. Tied 14–14. **Drive: 11 plays, 58 yards, 4:17.**
- DET – Zach Zenner 5-yard run (Matt Prater Kick), 7:40. Lions 21–14. **Drive: 8 plays, 53 yards, 4:01.**
- DAL – Dez Bryant 25-yard pass from Dak Prescott (Dan Bailey Kick), 1:04. Tied 21–21. **Drive: 6 plays, 51 yards, 2:10.**

**Third quarter**

- DAL – Ezekiel Elliott 1-yard run (Dan Bailey Kick), 10:19. Cowboys 28–21. **Drive: 3 plays, 38 yards, 1:46.**
- DAL – Jason Witten 10-yard pass from Dez Bryant (Dan Bailey Kick), 4:03. Cowboys 35–21. **Drive: 7 plays, 95 yards, 4:05.**

**Fourth quarter**

- DAL – Dez Bryant 19-yard pass from Dak Prescott (Dan Bailey Kick), 12:12. Cowboys 42–21. **Drive: 7 plays, 63 yards, 3:35.**

**Top passers**

- DET – Matthew Stafford – 26/46, 260 yards, INT
- DAL – Dak Prescott – 15/20, 212 yards, 3 TD

**Top rushers**

- DET – Zach Zenner – 12 rushes, 67 yards, 2 TD
- DAL – Ezekiel Elliott – 12 rushes, 80 yards, 2 TD

**Top receivers**

- DET – Eric Ebron – 8 receptions, 93 yards
- DAL – Dez Bryant – 4 receptions, 70 yards, 2 TD

The Cowboys improved to 13–2 and swept the NFC North. They became the first team since the 2008 Tennessee Titans to sweep both the AFC and NFC North in the same regular season. They also won their 13th game in the regular season for the third time in franchise history, and first time since 2007. Dez Bryant threw his first touchdown pass of his career.

==== Week 17: at Philadelphia Eagles ====
Week Seventeen: Dallas Cowboys at Philadelphia Eagles – Game summary

Quarter	1	2	3	4	Total
Cowboys	0	10	3	0	**13**
**Eagles**	3	7	7	10	**27**

at Lincoln Financial Field, Philadelphia, Pennsylvania

- Date: January 1, 2017
- Game time: 1:00 pm. EST/12:00 pm. CST
- Game weather: 50 °F (10 °C), sunny
- Game attendance: 69,596
- Referee: Walt Coleman
- TV announcers (Fox): Kevin Burkhardt, John Lynch and Pam Oliver
- Recap, Gamebook

Game information

**First quarter**

- PHI – Caleb Sturgis 22-yard field goal, 3:57. Eagles 3–0. **Drive: 14 plays, 79 yards, 8:18.**

**Second quarter**

- DAL – Dan Bailey 49-yard field goal, 14:51. Tied 3–3. **Drive: 9 plays, 44 yards, 4:06.**
- DAL – Terrance Williams 3-yard pass from Tony Romo (Dan Bailey kick), 10:11. Cowboys 10–3. **Drive: 6 plays, 81 yards, 2:49.**
- PHI – Zach Ertz 6-yard pass from Carson Wentz (Caleb Sturgis kick), 0:07. Tied 10–10. **Drive: 9 plays, 49 yards, 1:50.**

**Third quarter**

- DAL – Dan Bailey 23-yard field goal, 9:18. Cowboys 13–10. **Drive: 7 plays, 66 yards, 3:21.**
- PHI – Zach Ertz 20-yard pass from Carson Wentz (Caleb Sturgis kick), 4:56. Eagles 17–13. **Drive: 10 plays, 89 yards, 4:22.**

**Fourth quarter**

- PHI – Caleb Sturgis 33-yard field goal, 2:18. Eagles 20–13. **Drive: 14 plays, 75 yards, 7:51.**
- PHI – Terrell Watson 1-yard run (Caleb Sturgis kick), 1:23. Eagles 27–13. **Drive: 3 plays, 7 yards, 0:16.**

**Top passers**

- DAL – Mark Sanchez – 9/17, 85 yards, 2 INT
- PHI – Carson Wentz – 27/43, 245 yards, 2 TD

**Top rushers**

- DAL – Darren McFadden – 7 rushes, 28 yards
- PHI – Byron Marshall – 10 rushes, 42 yards

**Top receivers**

- DAL – Cole Beasley – 3 receptions, 49 yards
- PHI – Zach Ertz – 13 receptions, 139 yards, 2 TD

The Cowboys headed into their final game of the season, knowing they had an opportunity to have the most wins in a regular season as a franchise with a win against the Eagles. Instead, with everything already clinched and a game having no impact on the playoff picture, the Cowboys rested numerous key starters, including Elliott and Sean Lee, and only played Dak Prescott for two series. Tony Romo played for the first time since November 2015 and in his one series, threw a touchdown pass to Terrance Williams. With the 27–13 loss, their first in Philadelphia since Week 8 of the 2011 season, the Cowboys finished the regular season 13–3, with a 3–3 record against NFC East competition, and a 10–0 record outside of the division.

=== Standings ===
==== Division ====
NFC East
	W	L	T	PCT	DIV	CONF	PF	PA	STK
^{(1)} Dallas Cowboys	13	3	0	.813	3–3	9–3	421	306	L1
^{(5)} New York Giants	11	5	0	.688	4–2	8–4	310	284	W1
Washington Redskins	8	7	1	.531	3–3	6–6	396	383	L1
Philadelphia Eagles	7	9	0	.438	2–4	5–7	367	331	W2

==== Conference ====
NFC
#	Team	Division	W	L	T	PCT	DIV	CONF	SOS	SOV	STK
**Division leaders**
1	Dallas Cowboys	East	13	3	0	.813	3–3	9–3	.471	.440	L1
2	Atlanta Falcons	South	11	5	0	.688	5–1	9–3	.480	.452	W4
3	Seattle Seahawks	West	10	5	1	.656	3–2–1	6–5–1	.441	.425	W1
4	Green Bay Packers	North	10	6	0	.625	5–1	8–4	.508	.453	W6
**Wild Cards**
5	New York Giants	East	11	5	0	.688	4–2	8–4	.486	.455	W1
6 (Note: Detroit finished ahead of Tampa Bay for the No. 6 seed and qualified for the last playoff spot based on record vs. common opponents—Detroit's cumulative record against Chicago, Dallas, Los Angeles and New Orleans was 3–2, while Tampa Bay's cumulative record against the same four teams was 2–3.)	Detroit Lions	North	9	7	0	.563	3–3	7–5	.475	.392	L3
**Did not qualify for the postseason**
7	Tampa Bay Buccaneers	South	9	7	0	.563	4–2	7–5	.492	.434	W1
8	Washington Redskins	East	8	7	1	.531	3–3	6–6	.516	.430	L1
9	Minnesota Vikings	North	8	8	0	.500	2–4	5–7	.492	.457	W1
10	Arizona Cardinals	West	7	8	1	.469	4–1–1	6–5–1	.463	.366	W2
11 (Note: New Orleans finished ahead of Philadelphia based on better record vs. conference opponents.)	New Orleans Saints	South	7	9	0	.438	2–4	6–6	.523	.393	L1
12	Philadelphia Eagles	East	7	9	0	.438	2–4	5–7	.559	.518	W2
13	Carolina Panthers	South	6	10	0	.375	1–5	5–7	.518	.354	L2
14	Los Angeles Rams	West	4	12	0	.250	2–4	3–9	.504	.500	L7
15	Chicago Bears	North	3	13	0	.188	2–4	3–9	.521	.396	L4
16	San Francisco 49ers	West	2	14	0	.125	2–4	2–10	.504	.250	L1
**Tiebreakers** (Note: When breaking ties for three or more teams under the NFL's rules, they are first broken within divisions, then comparing only the highest-ranked remaining team from each division.)

== Postseason ==
=== Schedule ===
Playoff round	Date	Opponent (seed)	Result	Record	Game site	NFL.com recap
Wild Card	First-round bye					
Divisional	January 15, 2017	Green Bay Packers (4)	L 31–34	0–1	AT&T Stadium	Recap

=== Game summaries ===
==== NFC Divisional Playoffs: vs. (4) Green Bay Packers ====
NFC Divisional Playoffs: (4) Green Bay Packers at (1) Dallas Cowboys – Game summary

Quarter	1	2	3	4	Total
Packers	7	14	7	6	34
Cowboys	3	10	0	18	31

at AT&T Stadium, Arlington, Texas

- Date: January 15, 2017
- Game time: 3:40 p.m. CST
- Game weather: Played indoors (retractable roof closed)
- Game attendance: 93,396
- Referee: Tony Corrente
- TV announcers (Fox): Joe Buck, Troy Aikman, Erin Andrews and Chris Myers
- Recap, Gamebook

Game information

First quarter

- DAL – Dan Bailey 50-yard field goal, 11:23. Cowboys 3–0. Drive: 8 plays, 43 yards, 3:37.
- GB – Richard Rodgers 34-yard pass from Aaron Rodgers (Mason Crosby kick), 8:58. Packers 7–3. Drive: 5 plays, 75 yards, 2:25.

Second quarter

- GB – Ty Montgomery 3-yard run (Mason Crosby kick), 14:05. Packers 14–3. Drive: 13 plays, 90 yards, 5:47.
- GB – Ty Montgomery 1-yard run (Mason Crosby kick), 7:37. Packers 21–3. Drive: 9 plays, 80 yards, 5:24.
- DAL – Dez Bryant 34-yard pass from Dak Prescott (Dan Bailey kick), 6:03. Packers 21–10. Drive: 4 plays, 75 yards, 1:34.
- DAL – Dan Bailey 33-yard field goal, 1:00. Packers 21–13. Drive: 10 plays, 36 yards, 3:55.

Third quarter

- GB – Jared Cook 3-yard pass from Aaron Rodgers (Mason Crosby kick), 11:25. Packers 28–13. Drive: 6 plays, 75 yards, 3:35.

Fourth quarter

- DAL – Jason Witten 6-yard pass from Dak Prescott (Dan Bailey kick), 11:39. Packers 28–20. Drive: 10 plays, 59 yards, 5:40.
- DAL – Dez Bryant 7-yard pass from Dak Prescott (Dak Prescott run), 4:08. Tied 28–28. Drive: 11 plays, 80 yards, 5:06.
- GB – Mason Crosby 56-yard field goal, 1:33. Packers 31–28. Drive: 8 plays, 37 yards, 2:35.
- DAL – Dan Bailey 52-yard field goal, 0:35. Tied 31–31. Drive: 6 plays, 42 yards, 0:58.
- GB – Mason Crosby 51-yard field goal, 0:00. Packers 34–31. Drive: 6 plays, 43 yards, 0:35.

Top passers

- GB – Aaron Rodgers – 28/43, 356 yards, 2 TD, INT
- DAL – Dak Prescott – 24/38, 302 yards, 3 TD, INT

Top rushers

- GB – Ty Montgomery – 11 rushes, 47 yards, 2 TD
- DAL – Ezekiel Elliott – 22 rushes, 125 yards

Top receivers

- GB – Randall Cobb – 7 receptions, 62 yards
- DAL – Dez Bryant – 9 receptions, 132 yards, 2 TD

Despite having the No. 1 seed in the NFC and home-field advantage, the Cowboys' season came to an end in Dallas when they were defeated by the No. 4 seed Green Bay Packers 34–31, who avenged their Week 6 loss with a Mason Crosby field goal with just 3 seconds left in the game. For the first time since Week 14, Dak Prescott threw an interception as Packers safety Micah Hyde intercepted Prescott with 7:17 remaining in the third quarter.

With the loss, the Cowboys closed out their season with a 13–4 record.
