= Gavin Escobar =

American football player (1991–2022)

- Escobar with the Dallas Cowboys

No. 89, 81
- Position: Tight end

Personal information
- Born: February 3, 1991; New York City, New York, U.S.
- Died: September 28, 2022 (aged 31); Idyllwild, California, U.S.
- Listed height: 6 ft 6 in (1.98 m)
- Listed weight: 254 lb (115 kg)

Career information
- High school: Santa Margarita Catholic (Rancho Santa Margarita, California)
- College: San Diego State (2009–2012)
- NFL draft: 2013: 2nd round, 47th overall pick

Career history
- Dallas Cowboys (2013–2016); Kansas City Chiefs (2017)*; Baltimore Ravens (2017); Cleveland Browns (2018)*; Miami Dolphins (2018); San Diego Fleet (2019)
- * Offseason or practice squad member only

Awards and highlights
- 2× First-team All-MW (2011, 2012); Second-team All-MW (2010)

Career NFL statistics
- Games played: 64
- Receptions: 30
- Receiving yards: 333
- Receiving touchdowns: 8
- Stats at Pro Football Reference

Gavin Louis Escobar (February 3, 1991 – September 28, 2022) was an American professional football tight end who played for five seasons in the National Football League (NFL) and a season in the Alliance of American Football (AAF). He played for the Dallas Cowboys and Baltimore Ravens from 2013 to 2017, after having played college football for the San Diego State Aztecs.

== Early life ==
Escobar was born in New York City on February 3, 1991, to Erin and Harry Escobar. He had two siblings; his brother Declan Escobar and his sister Morgan Escobar.

After moving to California in the early 2000's, he attended Santa Margarita Catholic High School in Rancho Santa Margarita, California, where he played for the school's football and basketball teams.

In football, he was a Trinity League second-team selection on offense in 2008 after making 37 receptions for 492 yards and six scores. In a game against St. Bonaventure, the eventual state Division III champion, he had seven receptions for 130 yards.

As a junior, he caught 11 passes for 163 yards (14.8 yards per catch). He was regarded as a two-star recruit by Rivals.com. Additionally, Escobar was a standout basketball player and key contributor alongside NBA star Klay Thompson, as Santa Margarita reached the California Division III State Championship in 2008.

== College career ==
Escobar accepted a football scholarship from San Diego State University, where he played from 2009 to 2012. He was redshirted after being diagnosed with testicular cancer, which he was able to overcome after having the tumor removed.

As a redshirt freshman in 2010, he started 12 games, recording 29 receptions for 323 yards and 4 touchdowns.

Despite his decreased role the following year as a sophomore (6 starts in 13 games), his production improved and he finished fifth in the Mountain West Conference (MWC) in receptions (51), receiving yards (780), receiving touchdowns (7), and sixth in receiving yards per reception (15.3).

As a junior in 2012, he posted 42 receptions for 543 yards and had the fourth-most touchdowns in the conference (6). He declared for the NFL draft after the season, foregoing his final year of eligibility.

During the 2011 and 2012 seasons, Escobar was a first-team All-MWC selection. For his college career, he registered 122 receptions for 1,646 yards, 17 touchdowns and did not miss a game.

== Professional career ==
Pre-draft measurables
Height	Weight	Arm length	Hand span	40-yard dash	10-yard split	20-yard split	20-yard shuttle	Three-cone drill	Vertical jump	Broad jump	Bench press
6 ft 5 7/8 in (1.98 m)	254 lb (115 kg)	33 5/8 in (0.85 m)	9 3/4 in (0.25 m)	4.78 s	1.68 s	2.81 s	4.31 s	7.07 s	32.0 in (0.81 m)	9 ft 6 in (2.90 m)	12 reps
All values from NFL Combine/Pro Day

=== Dallas Cowboys ===
==== 2013 season ====
Escobar was selected by the Dallas Cowboys in the second round (47th overall) of the 2013 NFL draft. After having mixed results from using previous second round draft choices in tight ends Anthony Fasano and Martellus Bennett, the Cowboys surprised observers by selecting another tight end, when there was a bigger need on the offensive line.

He made his NFL debut with the Cowboys on September 8, 2013, at the age of 22, in a 36–31 win against the New York Giants. During his rookie season, he was expected to be a pass catching option in the two tight end packages, but he was used sparingly, registering 9 receptions for 134 yards and 2 touchdowns. He became the fifth rookie tight end in franchise history to catch multiple touchdowns in a season.

==== 2014 season ====
Escobar remained in a backup role in his second season in the league, but was passed on the depth chart by James Hanna, who was used to block at the point of attack in the running game. He was mostly used on special teams and as a red zone target, finishing with 105 receiving yards and 4 touchdowns on 9 receptions.

==== 2015 season ====
Escobar was unable to increase his role in the team's offense and remained as the third-string tight end, despite wide receiver Dez Bryant missing 7 games. The 12 games that quarterback Tony Romo missed also impacted his production, finishing with 8 receptions for 64 yards and one touchdown.

Escobar suffered a season-ending injury when he tore his right Achilles tendon in the last drive of the fourteenth game of the season against the New York Jets. On December 25, he was placed on the injured reserve list, in order to promote defensive tackle Casey Walker to the 53-man roster.

==== 2016 season ====
Escobar made a surprisingly quick recovery from his Achilles injury, allowing him to have a full participation in training camp, though he was passed on the depth chart by Geoff Swaim, who displayed better blocking ability. After being used primarily as a core special teams player and only participating in 29 offensive plays, Escobar became the backup tight end after Swaim suffered a season-ending injury in the week 10 win against the Pittsburgh Steelers. Because he struggled with his blocking, the Cowboys were forced to use offensive lineman Joe Looney as the blocking tight end in short yardage situations. Escobar finished with 4 receptions and one touchdown.

Although Escobar had the size and continued improving his technique, he could never develop into a dependable in-line blocker. As with other Cowboys tight ends during the Jason Witten era, the team's coaches could never find a complementary role for him in the passing game, which limited Escobar to never starting more than 4 games and recording more than 9 receptions in a season. He played in 62 games (7 starts), making 30 receptions for 333 yards and 8 touchdowns.

=== Kansas City Chiefs ===
Escobar signed a one-year contract as a free agent with the Kansas City Chiefs on March 31, 2017. However, Escobar was released on September 2 after not being able to pass Ross Travis on the depth chart.

=== Baltimore Ravens ===
On October 23, 2017, Escobar signed with the Baltimore Ravens, who were looking to improve their depth after tight end Maxx Williams re-injured his ankle. On November 18, he was released to make room for Danny Woodhead. He appeared in 2 games as a backup tight end and he did not register any stats.

=== Cleveland Browns ===
Escobar signed a reserve/future contract with the Cleveland Browns on January 15, 2018. He was released by the Browns on April 12.

=== Miami Dolphins ===
Escobar signed with the Miami Dolphins on April 16, 2018. He was released on September 1, but was re-signed five days later. Escobar was released by Miami on September 11.

=== San Diego Fleet ===
After getting released by the Dolphins, Escobar joined the San Diego Fleet of the newly-formed Alliance of American Football. He was placed on injured reserve on April 1, 2019. The league ceased operations later that month. Escobar caught 14 passes for 142 yards during the season.

== NFL career statistics ==
Year	Team	Games		Receiving					
Year	Team	GP	GS	Tgt	Rec	Yds	Avg	Lng	TD
2013	DAL	16	1	15	9	134	14.9	25	2
2014	DAL	16	1	13	9	105	11.7	26	4
2015	DAL	14	4	13	8	64	8.0	22	1
2016	DAL	16	1	7	4	30	7.5	14	1
Career		62	7	48	30	333	11.1	26	8

== Personal life ==
Escobar was married and had two children. After retiring from football, he worked as a firefighter for the Long Beach Fire Department in California, starting in February 2022.

Escobar died at around noon on September 28, 2022, while rock climbing near Tahquitz Rock in the San Bernardino National Forest. He was 31 years old. He was climbing with a friend who also died during the climb.
