= Andrew Gachkar =

American football player (born 1988)

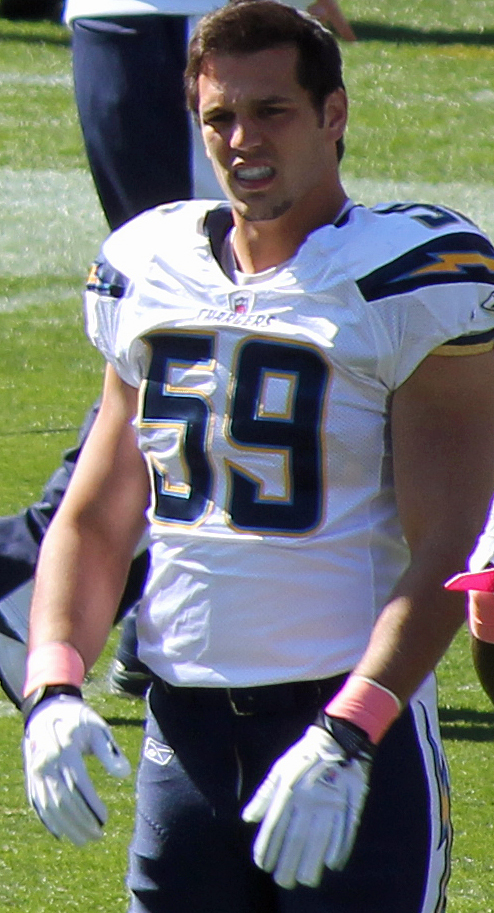
- Gachkar with the San Diego Chargers in 2011

Vanderbilt Commodores
- Title: Assistant nickels coach

Personal information
- Born: November 4, 1988 (age 38); Overland Park, Kansas, U.S.
- Listed height: 6 ft 2 in (1.88 m)
- Listed weight: 224 lb (102 kg)

Career information
- High school: Blue Valley West (Overland Park)
- College: Missouri
- NFL draft: 2011: 7th round, 234th overall pick

Career history

Playing
- San Diego Chargers (2011–2014); Dallas Cowboys (2015–2016); Jacksonville Jaguars (2017)*; Carolina Panthers (2017)
- * Offseason or practice squad member only

Coaching
- Vanderbilt (2026–present) Assistant nickels coach

Awards and highlights
- First-team All-Big 12 (2010)

Career NFL statistics
- Total tackles: 149
- Sacks: 2
- Forced fumbles: 1
- Fumble recoveries: 1
- Defensive touchdowns: 1
- Stats at Pro Football Reference

Andrew Gachkar (born November 4, 1988) is an American former professional football player who was a linebacker in the National Football League (NFL) for the San Diego Chargers, Dallas Cowboys, and Carolina Panthers. He was selected by the Chargers in the seventh round of the 2011 NFL draft. He played college football for the Missouri Tigers. He is currently the assistant nickels coach at Vanderbilt.

== Early life ==
Gachkar grew up in Overland Park, Kansas, and attended Blue Valley West High School. As a junior, he registered 83 tackles, 5 sacks, 2 interceptions (one returned for a touchdown) and 2 forced fumbles.

As a senior, he was limited by a shoulder injury, but still managed to be a two-way player at running back and linebacker. He was rated the number 10 overall prospect in the state of Kansas by Super Prep.

== College career ==
Gachkar accepted a football scholarship from the University of Missouri. As a true freshman, he appeared in 14 games, playing mainly on special teams. He made 16 defensive tackles and one forced fumble.

As a sophomore, he recovered from four surgeries in the off-season, where he had a rib removed to alleviate blood clotting issues in his right arm and upper body. He appeared in 14 games as a backup, collecting 28 tackles (one for loss).

As a junior, he started in 13 games at strongside linebacker, posting 80 tackles (second on the team), 3 sacks and 3 fumble recoveries (led the team). He was part of a defense that ranked 26th in the nation against the run (118.62-yard avg.). He had 4 tackles, one tackle, one forced fumble and 2 fumble recoveries against Nebraska. He made 9 tackles against Oklahoma State University. He had 10 tackles against Kansas State University.

As a senior, he was moved to weakside linebacker to replace All-American Sean Weatherspoon. He started in 13 games, finishing with 51 tackles (led the team), 8.5 tackles for loss, one sack and 2 interceptions. He was a part of the number one scoring defense in the nation.

== Professional career ==
Pre-draft measurables
Height	Weight	Arm length	Hand span	40-yard dash	10-yard split	20-yard split	20-yard shuttle	Three-cone drill	Vertical jump	Broad jump	Bench press
6 ft 2 3/8 in (1.89 m)	233 lb (106 kg)	31 1/2 in (0.80 m)	9 1/4 in (0.23 m)	4.56 s	1.60 s	2.70 s	4.29 s	6.95 s	34.0 in (0.86 m)	9 ft 10 in (3.00 m)	18 reps
All values from Pro Day

=== San Diego Chargers ===
Gachkar was selected by the San Diego Chargers in the seventh round (234th overall) of the 2011 NFL draft. On July 28, 2011, he was signed to a four-year deal with the Chargers. As a rookie, he posted 15 defensive tackles and 12 special teams tackles (second on the team).

He became a valuable special teams player, while also being a solid reserve linebacker. In 2012, he recorded 13 tackles (2 for loss), one sack and 8 special teams tackles.

In 2013, he started 3 out of 16 games, making 33 tackles (one for loss), one forced fumble and 8 special teams tackles. He had 6 tackles and one forced fumble against the Tennessee Titans. He made 8 tackles against the Washington Redskins.

In 2014, he received more playing time due to injuries and defensive coordinator John Pagano rotations at linebacker. He appeared in 15 games with 5 starts, registering, 49 tackles (6 for loss), one sack, one pass defensed 16 special teams tackles and also scored his first NFL touchdown against the St. Louis Rams on a fumble recovery. He had 8 tackles against the Denver Broncos.

=== Dallas Cowboys ===
On March 15, 2015, he signed with the Dallas Cowboys a two-year, $5.5 million contract, reuniting with former Chargers special teams coordinator Rich Bisaccia. As a reserve linebacker, he showed the ability to play all three positions and made Jasper Brinkley expendable. He started against the New Orleans Saints and posted 6 tackles. In the eighth game of the season against the Philadelphia Eagles, he saw extended time in place of Sean Lee who was out with a concussion, while tallying 4 tackles (one for loss). He played in every game, registering 8 special teams tackles (tied for fourth on the team) and 13 defensive tackles.

In 2016, he remained a core special teams player, making 7 defensive tackles, 2 quarterback pressures and 7 special teams tackles (tied for fourth on the team). In the season finale against the Eagles, the Cowboys rested players for the playoffs and Gachkar saw extended playing time, posting 5 tackles (one for loss), 2 quarterback pressures and a half-sack. He wasn't re-signed after the season.

=== Jacksonville Jaguars ===
On August 13, 2017, Gachkar signed with the Jacksonville Jaguars. He was released by Jacksonville on September 2.

=== Carolina Panthers ===
On October 17, 2017, Gachkar signed with the Carolina Panthers. He appeared in six games and was declared inactive in four contests, while making five special teams tackles (tied for third on the team). Gachkar wasn't re-signed after the season.

== NFL career statistics ==
Legend
	Led the league
**Bold**	Career high

=== Regular season ===
Year	Team	Games		Tackles					Interceptions					Fumbles			
Year	Team	GP	GS	Cmb	Solo	Ast	Sck	TFL	Int	Yds	TD	Lng	PD	FF	FR	Yds	TD
2011	SDG	**16**	0	15	11	4	0.0	0	0	0	0	0	0	0	0	0	0
2012	SDG	**16**	0	23	19	4	**1.0**	3	0	0	0	0	0	0	0	0	0
2013	SDG	**16**	3	33	24	9	0.0	1	0	0	0	0	0	**1**	0	0	0
2014	SDG	15	**5**	**49**	**38**	**11**	**1.0**	**8**	0	0	0	0	**1**	0	**1**	**13**	**1**
2015	DAL	**16**	1	14	10	4	0.0	2	0	0	0	0	0	0	0	0	0
2016	DAL	**16**	0	11	6	5	0.0	1	0	0	0	0	0	0	0	0	0
2017	CAR	6	0	4	4	0	0.0	0	0	0	0	0	0	0	0	0	0
		101	9	149	112	37	2.0	15	0	0	0	0	1	1	1	13	1

=== Playoffs ===
Year	Team	Games		Tackles					Interceptions					Fumbles			
Year	Team	GP	GS	Cmb	Solo	Ast	Sck	TFL	Int	Yds	TD	Lng	PD	FF	FR	Yds	TD
2013	SDG	**2**	0	**2**	0	**2**	0.0	0	0	0	0	0	0	0	0	0	0
2016	DAL	1	0	0	0	0	0.0	0	0	0	0	0	0	0	0	0	0
2017	CAR	1	0	1	**1**	0	0.0	0	0	0	0	0	0	0	0	0	0
		4	0	3	1	2	0.0	0	0	0	0	0	0	0	0	0	0

== Personal life ==
In 2007, after his freshman year at Missouri, Gachkar was diagnosed with Thoracic Outlet Syndrome. He had developed a blood clot because his collarbone and rib cage were too close together to allow proper blood flow through his veins. As a result, he underwent major surgery to remove one of his ribs, and a second surgery after another clot developed. He spent more than 20 hours in surgery and nearly a month in the hospital and lost 30 pounds. The surgeries initially put his football future in doubt, but after rehabilitation, he made it back for the 2008 season without missing a game.
