= Shaneil Jenkins =

American gridiron football player (born 1994)

Profile
- Position: Defensive end

Personal information
- Born: February 7, 1994 (age 32); District Heights, Maryland
- Listed height: 6 ft 4 in (1.93 m)
- Listed weight: 295 lb (134 kg)

Career information
- High school: Suitland High School
- College: Shepherd (WV)
- NFL draft: 2016: undrafted

Career history
- Denver Broncos (2016)*; Dallas Cowboys (2016)*; Seattle Seahawks (2016–2017)*; Green Bay Packers (2017)*; New York Jets (2018)*; Ottawa Redblacks (2019)
- * Offseason or practice squad member only

Awards and highlights
- 2× All-MEC (2014, 2015); MEC Defensive player of the year (2015)
- Stats at Pro Football Reference

Shaneil Jenkins (born February 7, 1994) is a gridiron football defensive end. He played college football at Shepherd University. He signed with the Denver Broncos as an undrafted free agent following the 2016 NFL draft.

== Early life ==
Jenkins attended Suitland High School. He accepted a football scholarship from Shepherd University, where he became a starter as a junior, registering 29 tackles (10.5 for loss), 7.5 sacks, 2 forced fumbles and 2 passes defensed.

In his senior season of 2015, during which the Rams advanced to the NCAA Division II championship game, Jenkins was named the Mountain East Conference Defensive Player of the Year. In addition, Jenkins earned first-team All-Region honors from CCA and Don Hansen's Football Gazette, as well as third-team Don Hansen's Football Gazette All-America honors and honorable mention D2Football.com All-America accolades. Jenkins was a 2015 finalist for Cliff Harris Award, given annually to the top defensive player in Division II, Division III and NAIA college football. He finished his college career with 48 games, 100 tackles and 27 sacks.

== Professional career ==
=== Denver Broncos ===
Jenkins was signed as an undrafted free agent by the Denver Broncos after the 2016 NFL draft. He was released on August 2.

=== Dallas Cowboys ===
On August 7, 2016, Jenkins was signed as a free agent by the Dallas Cowboys to provide depth because of injuries on the defensive line. He was moved from defensive end to defensive tackle, where he could use his power and be more effective. Even though he had a short time with the team, he was able to provide quality snaps and register 2 sacks in the first two preseason games. He had a chance to earn a roster spot before a suffering a knee injury. On August 30, he was waived/injured and placed on the injured reserve list after clearing waivers. On September 2, he was waived with an injury settlement.

=== Seattle Seahawks ===
On December 6, 2016, Jenkins was signed to the Seattle Seahawks' practice squad. He signed a reserve/future contract with the Seahawks on January 16, 2017. He was waived on August 12, 2017.

=== Green Bay Packers ===
On August 13, 2017, Jenkins was claimed off waivers by the Green Bay Packers, only to be waived two days later.

=== New York Jets ===
On July 28, 2018, Jenkins signed with the New York Jets. He was waived/injured on August 3, 2018 and was placed on injured reserve. He was released on August 15, 2018.

=== Ottawa Redblacks ===
On March 27, 2019, Jenkins signed with the Ottawa Redblacks of the Canadian Football League. He re-signed with the Redblacks on January 19, 2021. He was placed on the suspended list on May 20, 2021.
