= Dax Swanson =

American football player (born 1991)

No. 25, 28, 35
- Position: Cornerback

Personal information
- Born: March 21, 1991 (age 35); Waco, Texas, U.S.
- Listed height: 5 ft 11 in (1.80 m)
- Listed weight: 185 lb (84 kg)

Career information
- High school: La Vega (Bellmead, Texas)
- College: Sam Houston State
- NFL draft: 2013: undrafted

Career history
- Indianapolis Colts (2013)*; San Francisco 49ers (2013–2014)*; New England Patriots (2014–2015)*; Tampa Bay Buccaneers (2015)*; New York Giants (2015)*; Miami Dolphins (2015–2016)*; Dallas Cowboys (2016)
- * Offseason or practice squad member only

Awards and highlights
- Super Bowl champion (XLIX); All-SLC (2012); Second-team All-SLC (2011)
- Stats at Pro Football Reference

Daxton Swanson (born March 21, 1991) is an American former professional football cornerback who played college football at Sam Houston State. Swanson signed with the Indianapolis Colts as an undrafted free agent in 2013.

== College career ==
Swanson spent his first year at Toledo University before transferring to Sam Houston State the next year, immediately earning a starting position. He was an honorable mention All-Southland Conference selection in his sophomore year, a second-team All-Southland Conference player in his junior year, and a first-team All-Southland Conference player in his senior year, getting 46 tackles, 14 pass breakups, and 4 interceptions. He ended his college career as the all-time leader in interceptions at Sam Houston State, with 14.

== Professional career ==
=== Indianapolis Colts ===
Swanson declared for the 2013 NFL draft, but went undrafted. One contributing factor to his being undrafted was that he tore his hamstring two weeks before the NFL Combine. He signed with the Indianapolis Colts in time for the 2013 season, but was placed on the injured reserve and was waived on October 29.

=== San Francisco 49ers ===
He was then signed with the San Francisco 49ers on the practice squad before being released on May 12, 2014.

=== New England Patriots ===
On May 22, 2014, Swanson was signed by the New England Patriots. On August 30, he was waived. On September 1, he was signed to the practice squad. On September 3, he was released from practice squad. On September 17, he was re-signed to the practice squad. On November 26, he was released from practice squad. On December 3, he was re-signed to the practice squad. On December 23, he was released from practice squad. On December 27, he was re-signed to the practice squad. He also earned a Super Bowl ring.

Swanson was released by the Patriots on September 5, 2015.

=== Tampa Bay Buccaneers ===
On October 20, 2015, Swanson was signed to the practice squad of the Tampa Bay Buccaneers. On October 27, he was released from practice squad.

=== New York Giants ===
On November 5, 2015, Swanson was signed by the Giants to the practice squad. On November 16, 2015, he was released by the Giants.

=== Miami Dolphins ===
On November 25, 2015, Swanson was signed by the Dolphins to the practice squad. On February 23, 2016, Swanson was waived by the Dolphins.

=== Dallas Cowboys ===
On June 13, 2016, Swanson signed with the Dallas Cowboys. In preseason he made the team over Deji Olatoye. On September 12, he was released to make room for defensive end Ryan Davis.
