= Darius Jackson =

American football player (born 1993)

No. 26, 22
- Position: Running back

Personal information
- Born: December 1, 1993 (age 32); Sparta, Illinois, U.S.
- Listed height: 6 ft 0 in (1.83 m)
- Listed weight: 225 lb (102 kg)

Career information
- High school: Sparta
- College: Eastern Michigan (2012–2015)
- NFL draft: 2016: 6th round, 216th overall pick

Career history
- Dallas Cowboys (2016); Cleveland Browns (2016–2017); Dallas Cowboys (2018)*; Green Bay Packers (2018); Dallas Cowboys (2018–2019); Indianapolis Colts (2019)*; Tampa Bay Buccaneers (2019)*; Indianapolis Colts (2019–2020)*; Las Vegas Raiders (2021)*; Houston Texans (2021)*
- * Offseason or practice squad member only

Career NFL statistics
- Games played: 4
- Rushing attempts: 6
- Rushing yards: 16
- Stats at Pro Football Reference

Darius Jackson (born December 1, 1993) is an American former professional football player who was a running back in the National Football League (NFL) for the Dallas Cowboys, Cleveland Browns, Green Bay Packers, Indianapolis Colts, Tampa Bay Buccaneers, Las Vegas Raiders, and Houston Texans. He played college football for the Eastern Michigan Eagles. Jackson was selected by the Dallas Cowboys in the sixth round of the 2016 NFL draft.

== Early life ==
Jackson attended Sparta High School in Sparta, Illinois. He was a two-way football player as a senior, registering almost 1,100 rushing yards, while playing quarterback, running back and safety. He received All-conference honors on both sides of the ball and was an Academic All-state selection. He also practiced baseball.

== College career ==
He accepted a football scholarship from Eastern Michigan University. As a sophomore, he appeared in seven games (one start) and had 201 rushing yards. The next year, he appeared in all 12 games (4 starts), posting 295 rushing yards.

As a senior, he became a full-time starter and had a break out year, rushing for 1,078 yards on 208 carries (5.2 avg.), 14 rushing touchdowns, 21 receptions for 201 yards, two receiving touchdowns and 16 total touchdowns (school record).

== Professional career ==
Pre-draft measurables
Height	Weight	Arm length	Hand span	40-yard dash	10-yard split	20-yard split	20-yard shuttle	Three-cone drill	Vertical jump	Broad jump	Bench press
6 ft 0 in (1.83 m)	220 lb (100 kg)	31 5/8 in (0.80 m)	8 5/8 in (0.22 m)	4.40 s	1.56 s	2.51 s	4.29 s	6.87 s	41.0 in (1.04 m)	11 ft 1 in (3.38 m)	20 reps
All values from 2016 EMU Pro Day.

=== Dallas Cowboys (first stint) ===
Jackson was selected by the Dallas Cowboys in the sixth round (216th overall) of the 2016 NFL draft, in part because of the athletic traits he displayed during his pro day. He made the Cowboys 53-man roster, in order to protect his rights from being claimed by another team and was declared inactive in 14 games. On December 13, he was waived to make room for running back Darren McFadden, who was being activated from the non football injury list.

=== Cleveland Browns ===
On December 14, 2016, Jackson was claimed off waivers by the Cleveland Browns. He was declared inactive for the remaining three games.

On June 1, 2017, Jackson was waived/injured with an undisclosed knee injury that forced him to miss organized team activities. He cleared waivers and was placed on the injured reserve list on June 2.

On May 3, 2018, Jackson was waived by the Browns.

=== Dallas Cowboys (second stint) ===
On May 30, 2018, Jackson signed with the Cowboys. On September 1, 2018, he was waived by the Cowboys and was signed to the practice squad the next day.

=== Green Bay Packers ===
On September 3, 2018, Jackson was signed by the Green Bay Packers from the Cowboys' practice squad, as the team was looking for a third running back, with Aaron Jones suspended for the first two games, and Devante Mays being released with an injury settlement. He was waived on October 6, 2018.

=== Dallas Cowboys (third stint) ===
On October 9, 2018, Jackson was signed to the Cowboys practice squad. He was promoted to the active roster on December 22, 2018. Overall, in the 2018 season, he had six carries for 16 yards, all of which came in the regular season finale against the New York Giants.

On August 30, 2019, Jackson was released by the Cowboys, then re-signed to the practice squad on September 11. He was released on September 16.

=== Indianapolis Colts (first stint) ===
On September 20, 2019, Jackson was signed to the Indianapolis Colts practice squad, but was released four days later.

=== Tampa Bay Buccaneers ===
On October 9, 2019, Jackson was signed to the Tampa Bay Buccaneers practice squad. He was released on October 15.

=== Indianapolis Colts (second stint) ===
On November 12, 2019, Jackson was signed to the Colts practice squad. He signed a reserve/future contract with the Colts on December 30, 2019.

On August 2, 2020, Jackson was waived by the Colts. He was re-signed to the practice squad on September 16, 2020. He was released on November 3, and re-signed to the practice squad three days later. He was released on November 7 and re-signed three days later to the practice squad. He was released on December 1, 2020.

=== Las Vegas Raiders ===
On July 29, 2021, Jackson signed with the Las Vegas Raiders. He was waived on August 2.

=== Houston Texans ===
On August 11, 2021, Jackson signed with the Houston Texans. He was waived on August 23. He was re-signed to the practice squad on November 30, 2021. He was released on January 5, 2022.
