= James Hanna (American football) =

American football player (born 1989)

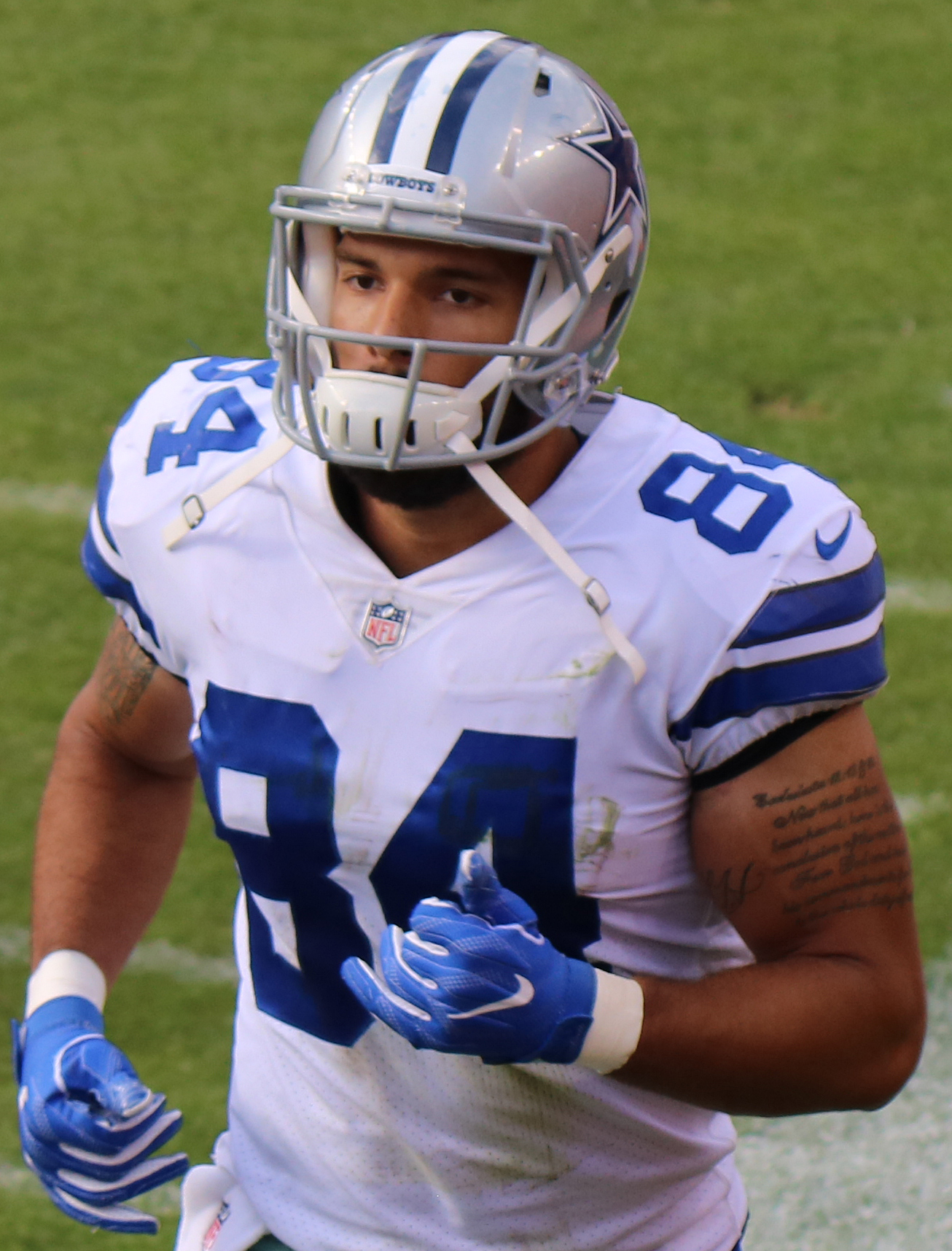
- Hanna with the Dallas Cowboys in 2017

No. 84
- Position: Tight end

Personal information
- Born: July 14, 1989 (age 37); Lakewood, Ohio, U.S.
- Listed height: 6 ft 4 in (1.93 m)
- Listed weight: 260 lb (118 kg)

Career information
- High school: Flower Mound (TX)
- College: Oklahoma
- NFL draft: 2012: 6th round, 186th overall pick

Career history
- Dallas Cowboys (2012–2017)

Awards and highlights
- Second-team All-Big 12 (2011)

Career NFL statistics
- Games played: 78
- Receptions: 37
- Receiving yards: 374
- Receiving average: 10.1
- Receiving touchdowns: 1
- Stats at Pro Football Reference

James Hanna (born July 14, 1989) is an American former professional football player who was a tight end for the Dallas Cowboys of the National Football League (NFL). He played college football for the Oklahoma Sooners and was selected by the Cowboys in the sixth round of the 2012 NFL draft.

== Early life ==
Hanna attended Coram Deo Academy, where he played six-man football at wide receiver, helping the team achieve a 9-2 and an 11–1 record in his two years there.

After his sophomore season, Hanna transferred to Flower Mound High School, where he played the traditional 11-man football at wide receiver.

As a junior, Hanna tallied 20 receptions for 330 yards (16.5-yard average) and two touchdowns.

As a senior, Hanna had 53 receptions for 764 yards (14.4-yard average) with 11 touchdowns, 17 carries for 131 yards, five punt returns for 145 yards and a touchdown (71 yards) and six kickoff returns for 181 yards and a touchdown. He received honorable-mention All-state and Class 5A/Region 1 District VI Offensive MVP honors.

== College career ==
Hanna accepted a football scholarship from the University of Oklahoma, with the intention of being converted into a tight end.

As a freshman, Hanna played mostly on special teams.

As a sophomore, Hanna appeared in 12 games with two starts, catching six passes for 48 yards.

As a junior, Hanna was named the starter at tight end, registering 18 receptions for 292 yards (16.2-yard average) and seven touchdowns, one special teams tackle, and two kickoff returns for nine yards. Against Florida State University, he scored his first career touchdown. Against Oklahoma State University, Hanna had career-highs with four receptions for 180 yards, including a career-long 76-yard touchdown.

As a senior, Hanna started 13 games, posting 27 receptions for 381 yards (14.1-yard average) and two touchdowns, three special teams tackles. He finished his college career ranked eighth in school history for tight ends with 52 receptions for 720 yards.

== Professional career ==
Pre-draft measurables
Height	Weight	Arm length	Hand span	40-yard dash	10-yard split	20-yard split	20-yard shuttle	Three-cone drill	Vertical jump	Broad jump	Bench press
6 ft 3 3/4 in (1.92 m)	252 lb (114 kg)	33 1/8 in (0.84 m)	9 7/8 in (0.25 m)	4.49 s	1.57 s	2.67 s	4.11 s	6.76 s	36.0 in (0.91 m)	10 ft 2 in (3.10 m)	24 reps
All values from NFL Combine

=== Dallas Cowboys ===
Hanna's position in the 2012 NFL draft was greatly improved by his NFL Scouting Combine performance, displaying great speed (4.49 seconds in the 40-yard dash) and athleticism, topping all tight ends in five different categories.

Hanna was selected by the Dallas Cowboys in the sixth round (186th overall) of the 2012 NFL draft, to improve the depth at the tight end position after losing Martellus Bennett in free agency. As a rookie, he was given the number worn by Jay Novacek and became a core special teams player, finishing fifth on the team with 10 tackles.

Hanna's progress in the offense was slow until the 2014 season, when he found a role as a point-of-attack blocker and helped DeMarco Murray become the NFL leading rusher. Hanna also finished second on the team with 12 special teams tackles.

In 2015, Hanna sprained the medial collateral ligament in his left knee during the first preseason game against the San Diego Chargers, slowing him down in training camp. After playing in the season opener, the injury forced Hanna to miss the second game against the Philadelphia Eagles and to have surgery on September 21. He was declared inactive for the fifth game against the New England Patriots. During the season, Hanna was able to play through knee and ankle injuries, while continuing to improve his run blocking and help Darren McFadden rush for 1,000 yards for just the second time in his career.

On March 11, 2016, Hanna signed a three-year contract as a free agent to remain with the Cowboys. He was diagnosed with a bone bruise in his right knee at the start of training camp, that required him to have surgery and be placed on the physical unable to perform list. The injury was more serious than expected and Hanna had a second surgery in November, effectively ending his season without any games played.

On September 1, 2017, Hanna secured the backup tight end position on the depth chart ahead of Geoff Swaim. He appeared in 16 games (8 starts) as the blocking tight end and recorded his first career touchdown reception against the Los Angeles Rams.

=== Retirement ===
On April 20, 2018, Hanna announced his retirement from the NFL after dealing with knee issues the previous two seasons. He finished his career with 37 receptions for 374 yards (10.1-yard average) and a touchdown.

== NFL career statistics ==
Year	Team	Games		Receiving					Fumbles	
Year	Team	GP	GS	Rec	Yds	Avg	Lng	TD	Fum	Lost
2012	DAL	16	2	8	86	10.8	29	0	0	0
2013	DAL	16	8	12	73	6.1	21	0	0	0
2014	DAL	16	12	4	48	12.0	27	0	0	0
2015	DAL	14	7	9	79	8.8	17	0	0	0
2016	DAL	0	0	Did not play due to injury						
2017	DAL	16	8	4	88	22.0	31	1	0	0
Career		78	37	37	374	10.1	31	1	0	0
