= James Morris (American football) =

American football player (born 1991)

No. 46
- Position: Linebacker

Personal information
- Born: November 20, 1991 (age 34); Solon, Iowa, U.S.
- Listed height: 6 ft 1 in (1.85 m)
- Listed weight: 241 lb (109 kg)

Career information
- High school: Solon
- College: Iowa
- NFL draft: 2014: undrafted

Career history
- New England Patriots (2014); New York Giants (2015); Dallas Cowboys (2016)

Awards and highlights
- Super Bowl champion (XLIX)

Career NFL statistics
- Total tackles: 2
- Stats at Pro Football Reference

James Morris (born November 20, 1991) is an American former professional football player who was a linebacker in the National Football League (NFL). He was signed as an undrafted free agent by the New England Patriots in 2014. He played college football for the Iowa Hawkeyes.

== Professional career ==
=== New England Patriots ===
Morris was signed as an undrafted free agent by the New England Patriots on May 16, 2014. He was then released on May 20, 2014. Morris was then re-signed by the New England Patriots on August 3, 2014. He was placed on injured reserve during final cuts on August 30 of that year. Morris won Super Bowl XLIX with the Patriots after they defeated the defending champion Seattle Seahawks 28-24. On September 4, 2015, Morris was waived by the Patriots.

=== New York Giants ===
On September 16, 2015, the New York Giants signed Morris to their practice squad. On October 31, 2015, the Giants announced they had waived cornerback Brandon McGee, and promoted Morris to their active roster. On November 17, 2015, Morris was waived by the Giants. On November 19, 2015, Morris was re-signed to the practice squad. On December 5, 2015, he was promoted to the active roster. On December 25, 2015, Morris was placed on injured reserve due to a quad injury. On May 9, 2016, Morris was waived by the Giants.

=== Dallas Cowboys ===
On August 2, 2016, Morris was signed as a free agent by the Dallas Cowboys. The move was intended to provide depth because of the injuries at the linebacker position. On August 30, he was placed on the injured reserve list.
