= Deon King =

American football player (born 1993)

No. 50, 59, 56
- Position: Linebacker

Personal information
- Born: July 2, 1993 (age 33); Reston, Virginia, U.S.
- Listed height: 6 ft 0 in (1.83 m)
- Listed weight: 225 lb (102 kg)

Career information
- High school: South Lakes (Reston)
- College: Norfolk State
- NFL draft: 2016: undrafted

Career history
- Dallas Cowboys (2016)*; San Diego Chargers (2016); Indianapolis Colts (2016); Cleveland Browns (2017); Jacksonville Jaguars (2017); Saskatchewan Roughriders (2018)
- * Offseason or practice squad member only

Awards and highlights
- Buck Buchanan Award (2015); FCS All-American (2015); HBCU All-American (2015); 2× All-MEAC (2014, 2015); Second-team All-MEAC (2013)

Career NFL statistics
- Games played: 15
- Total tackles: 4
- Stats at Pro Football Reference

Deon Jerome King (born July 2, 1993) is an American former professional football player who was a linebacker in the National Football League (NFL). He played college football for the Norfolk State Spartans.

== Early life ==
King attended South Lakes High School in Reston, Virginia. As a sophomore, he had 9 sacks. As a junior, he collected 12 sacks. As a senior linebacker, he posted 100 tackles and 10 sacks, while receiving All-Liberty District honors

He also competed in the shot put and received All-district honors as a senior. He enrolled at Fork Union Military Academy to work on his grades.

== College career ==
=== Freshman season ===
In 2012, he accepted a football scholarship from Norfolk State University. Joining the Spartans as a true freshman, he played in all 11 games that season as an outside linebacker and special teams.

In his debut game against in-state rival Virginia State, King put up a season high 5 tackles, with 3 of them being for loss and 2 sacks. Of those 2 sacks, one was on the final play of the game giving Norfolk State their first shutout since 2001.

In the season finale against conference member Morgan State, King earned 2 tackles and his career first interception, which he returned for 15 yards for a touchdown. His performance during the game earned him MEAC Rookie of the Week honors and topped off his freshman season with 19 tackles, with 12 of them being solo efforts.

=== Sophomore season ===
In the 2013 season opener against Maine, King had five tackles, one of them a quarterback sack. The following week against Rutgers he earned 9.5 sacks against the scarlet knights. For the next 5 games, King would make at least 8 tackles. During the annual meeting between rival Hampton, King would make a season high 13 tackles, with 10 of them being solo efforts.

King ended the season earning All-MEAC second-team honors and spots on both Norfolk’s Athletics Director’s Honor Roll and the MEAC Commissioner’s All-Academic Team. He also ranked second in the conference for both tackles for loss and sacks, with 18.5 tackles and 9.5 sacks. King’s performance also gained national recognition by ranking 8th in FCS in tackles for loss per game with an average of 1.5 and 16th in sacks with an average of 0.79 per game. Kings sacking average would tie him for the third-most in a single season since the program’s transition to Division-I in 1997.

=== Junior season ===
In the 2014 season, King started as an outside linebacker for all 12 of the Spartan’s games that season. During the season opener against Maine, King would make 9 tackles and 1 sack. King would also have a strong showing against Morgan State where he earned 7 tackles, 3 quarterback hurries, broke up 1 pass and forced 1 fumble. In the annual rivalry game against Hampton, King was able to rack up 15 stops helping the Spartans earn a victory. King would prove to be an asset to the Spartans in their meeting with Florida A&M as he completed eight tackles, forced a fumble, and recovered a fumble.

The following week, against Bethune-Cookman, King earned a season-high 19 tackles, 1 interception, and forced a fourth-quarter fumble, which the Spartans were able to recover. King’s performance during the game tied him at the top of the MEAC for the most tackles during the season.

In the season finale against South Carolina State, King would set a career-high 9 tackles, one of them a sack. King’s season would end with a total 106 tackles, with 46 of them being solo efforts and 60 assists.

King also received national recognition when he ranked in the top 50 in fumble recoveries, tackles for loss, total tackles, and sacks. He was also named the team’s Defensive MVP and awarded a spot on the 2014 MEAC first-team.

=== Senior season ===
In the 2015 season, he was named to the preseason All-MEAC first-team and opened the season with 12 tackles and 1 pass breakup against Rutgers. In the following weeks, against FBS opponents Old Dominion and Marshall, King would have back to back 21 tackle games.

He followed up that performance the following week with a total 10 tackles half a tackle for loss and 1 interception in a victory against Hampton at the Battle of the Bay rivalry game. His performance during that game would earn him his first MEAC Defensive Player of the Week award.

Later in the season King posted 15 tackles and 1.5 tackles for loss against North Carolina A&T; 15 tackles against Bethune-Cookman and 14 tackles, with 9 solos, against North Carolina Central. The following weeks, against Savannah State and South Carolina State, King would earn back to back MEAC Defensive Player of the Week honors for his performance. King posted 17 tackles and one tackle for loss against Savannah State and 18 tackles; including 12 solo efforts, 3 Tackles for loss and 2 sacks against SC State.

King also earned other postseason honors such as being named a Boxtorow HBCU All American; STATS, AP FCS All-American; AFCA and SBN Sports Black College All-American. King was also awarded the Buck Buchanan Award as the top defensive player in FCS for 2015.

== Professional career ==
=== Dallas Cowboys ===
King was signed as an undrafted free agent by the Dallas Cowboys after the 2016 NFL draft. On September 3, 2016, he was released by the Cowboys as part of final roster cuts and was signed to the practice squad the next day, then released three days later on September 6, 2016.

=== San Diego Chargers ===
On October 4, 2016, King was signed to the San Diego Chargers' practice squad. He was promoted to the active roster on November 5, 2016. He was released on November 14, 2016.

=== Indianapolis Colts ===
King was claimed off waivers by the Colts on November 15, 2016. He was waived by the Colts on May 1, 2017.

=== Cleveland Browns ===
On June 12, 2017, King was signed by the Cleveland Browns. He was waived by the Browns on September 2, 2017 and was signed to the practice squad the next day. He was promoted to the active roster on October 3, 2017.

He was waived on November 8, 2017 and was re-signed to the practice squad the next day. He was promoted back to the active roster on November 15, 2017. He was waived on December 20, 2017.

=== Jacksonville Jaguars ===
On December 23, 2017, King was signed to the Jacksonville Jaguars' practice squad. He was promoted to the active roster on January 13, 2018.

On September 1, 2018, King was waived by the Jaguars.

=== Saskatchewan Roughriders (CFL) ===
On October 23, 2018, he was signed as a free agent by the Saskatchewan Roughriders of the Canadian Football League. He spent 3 weeks on the practice roster before being promoted to the active roster on December 6. He was released on June 8, 2019.
