= Josh Thomas (cornerback) =

American football player (born 1989)

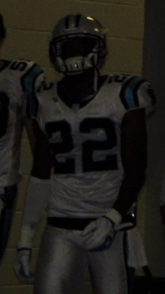
- Thomas with the Carolina Panthers in 2012

No. 22, 24, 32, 35, 41
- Position: Cornerback

Personal information
- Born: May 3, 1989 (age 37); Cedar Hill, Texas, U.S.
- Listed height: 5 ft 10 in (1.78 m)
- Listed weight: 196 lb (89 kg)

Career information
- High school: Cedar Hill
- College: Buffalo
- NFL draft: 2011: 5th round, 143rd overall pick

Career history
- Dallas Cowboys (2011)*; Carolina Panthers (2011–2013); Seattle Seahawks (2014); New York Jets (2014); Detroit Lions (2014); Minnesota Vikings (2015)*; Indianapolis Colts (2015); Dallas Cowboys (2015–2016)
- * Offseason or practice squad member only

Career NFL statistics
- Total tackles: 70
- Fumble recoveries: 2
- Pass deflections: 13
- Interceptions: 1
- Stats at Pro Football Reference

Josh Thomas (born May 3, 1989) is an American former professional football player who was a cornerback in the National Football League (NFL). He was selected by the Dallas Cowboys in the fifth round of the 2011 NFL draft. He played college football for the Buffalo Bulls.

== Early life ==
Born in Cedar Hill, Texas, Thomas attended Cedar Hill High School before accepting a scholarship from the University at Buffalo. Thomas volunteered to play free safety because the team had a surplus of cornerbacks. He played well, recording 109 tackles and 3 interceptions, but did not attract the high-level recruiting attention that coach Joey McGuire thought he deserved. Then, Buffalo coach Turner Gill, of Fort Worth, Texas, convinced him to head north.

Thomas also starred in track & field at Cedar, where he competed in hurdles and relays. As a junior in 2006, he posted a personal-best time of 37.19 seconds in the 300-meter hurdles at the UIL T&F Championships. At the 2007 District Meet, he placed 3rd in the 110-meter hurdles with a time of 14.47 seconds, 2nd in the 300-meter hurdles with a time of 37.33 seconds and ran the second leg on the 4 × 400 m relay squad, helping Cedar win the event with a time of 3:14.81.

== College career ==
Thomas played football for the Bulls at the University at Buffalo from 2007 to 2010. He appeared in 47 games, starting 34 of them. He amassed 205 tackles, two sacks, five forced fumbles (two recoveries), two interceptions and 27 passes defended.

Thomas started four games as a true freshman and registered 45 tackles, 4 passes defended and one interception.

As a sophomore, Thomas played in 12 games with eight starts. He finished second on the team with six passes defended and recorded 57 tackles and three forced fumbles.

As a junior in 2009, Thomas had 10 starts, recorded 45 tackles and ranked second on the team with 9 passes defended.

In his last year at Buffalo, Thomas was the team's top cornerback, mainly covering the opposing teams' top wide receiver; he posted 12 starts, 58 tackles, 8 passes defended, one interception and 2 sacks.

Thomas also competed as a sprinter on the Buffalo Bulls track and field team.

== Professional career ==
=== Pre-draft ===
Pre-draft measurables
Height	Weight	Arm length	Hand span	Wingspan	40-yard dash	10-yard split	20-yard split	20-yard shuttle	Three-cone drill	Vertical jump	Broad jump	Bench press
5 ft 10 1/4 in (1.78 m)	191 lb (87 kg)	31 5/8 in (0.80 m)	9 1/8 in (0.23 m)	6 ft 4 1/8 in (1.93 m)	4.43 s	1.59 s	2.53 s	4.15 s	6.89 s	40.0 in (1.02 m)	10 ft 8 in (3.25 m)	13 reps
All values from NFL Combine/Pro Day

=== Dallas Cowboys (first stint) ===
Thomas was selected in the fifth round (143rd overall) of the 2011 NFL draft by the Dallas Cowboys. Since 1969, Ed Ellis (125th pick in 1997) and Khalil Mack (5th pick in 2014) remain the only other Buffalo players selected sooner. He was waived on September 3.

=== Carolina Panthers ===
On September 4, 2011, he was claimed off the waivers by the Carolina Panthers. In 2012, he started the last 4 games, registered 24 tackles, 7 passes defended (second on the team) and 7 special teams tackles.

On the third play of a game against the Miami Dolphins on November 24, 2013, Thomas intercepted a pass from Ryan Tannehill which was intended for Rishard Matthews. It would be the only interception of his professional career. In 2013, he played in 13 games (6 starts and 3 inactive) as part of a defensive unit that ranked second in the league in points allowed and total defense. He finished with 28 tackles, 2 passes defended, 4 special teams tackles and one interception. He was released on August 30, 2014.

=== Seattle Seahawks ===
On September 8, 2014, he signed with the Seattle Seahawks to replace Jeremy Lane who was placed on the injured reserve list. He was cut on October 8, after playing in three games to make room for center Patrick Lewis.

=== New York Jets ===
Thomas signed with the New York Jets on October 13, 2014. He provided depth after the team placed cornerback Dee Milliner on the injured reserve list. Thomas was released on December 16, days after his car was broken into and, by his estimate, nearly $12,000 worth of items were stolen. According to Thomas, the Jets told him that part of the reason that he was released was because he did not "engage" enough with his teammates.

=== Detroit Lions ===
The day after his release from the Jets, Thomas was claimed off waivers by the Detroit Lions on December 17, 2014. In his brief stint with the Lions, Thomas earned $75,882 while appearing in only one game and failing to record any statistics.

=== Minnesota Vikings ===
The Minnesota Vikings signed Thomas on July 24, 2015, following the news that cornerback Jabari Price would be suspended for two games to start the season. He was released on September 5.

=== Indianapolis Colts ===
On September 22, 2015, he was signed as a free agent by the Indianapolis Colts. He was cut on December 8.

=== Dallas Cowboys (second stint) ===
On December 30, 2015, because of injuries to cornerback Morris Claiborne and safety Barry Church, the Dallas Cowboys signed him to play in the last game of the season against the Washington Redskins.

On August 29, 2016, he was placed on the injured reserve list with a left thumb injury he suffered in the preseason game against the Seattle Seahawks. On November 22, the Cowboys moved Thomas to the Non-Football Injury list. He was not re-signed in 2017.
