= Rodney Coe =

American football player (born 1993)

No. 61
- Position: Defensive tackle

Personal information
- Born: May 18, 1993 (age 33); Fulton, Missouri, U.S.
- Listed height: 6 ft 3 in (1.91 m)
- Listed weight: 305 lb (138 kg)

Career information
- High school: Edwardsville (IL)
- College: Akron
- NFL draft: 2016: undrafted

Career history
- Dallas Cowboys (2016)*; Tampa Bay Buccaneers (2016)*; Jacksonville Jaguars (2016)*; Seattle Seahawks (2017); Detroit Lions (2017)
- * Offseason or practice squad member only

Career NFL statistics
- Games played: 1
- Stats at Pro Football Reference

Rodney Coe (born May 18, 1993) is an American former professional football player who was a defensive tackle in the National Football League (NFL) for the Tampa Bay Buccaneers, Jacksonville Jaguars, Seattle Seahawks and Detroit Lions. He played college football for the Akron Zips.

== Early life ==
Coe attended Edwardsville High School, where he was a two-way player at running back and linebacker. As a sophomore, he appeared in 5 games, registering 118 carries for 912 yards and 9 touchdowns.

As a junior, he appeared in 10 games, tallying 106 carries for 978 yards and 12 touchdowns. He received Telegraph Player of the Year honors. As a senior, he was limited with injuries. He only played in 2 games, collecting 44 carries for 230 yards and 3 touchdowns.

== College career ==
After being recruited by the University of Iowa, Coe decided to attend Iowa Western Community College to improve his grades and further his football career as a running back. As a freshman, he had 80 carries for 468 yards and 9 touchdowns.

As a sophomore, he was converted into a defensive tackle, registering 42 tackles (9 for loss), 1.5 sacks and 2 forced fumbles, while receiving second-team all-conference honors. He contributed to the team having an undefeated season (12-0) and winning the JUCO National Championship. In the title game he had 7 tackles (one for loss).

After two years, Coe committed to Iowa State University. As a junior, he started the last four games, finishing the season with 37 tackles (4.5 tackles for loss) and 2 passes defensed. On March 24, 2014, Coe was dismissed from the Iowa State team by head coach Paul Rhoads for a violation of team rules.

Coe chose to end his college career at the University of Akron. He sat out the 2014 season to comply with NCAA transfer rules.

As a senior, he contributed to the team having an 8-5 record and winning its first FBS bowl (Famous Idaho Potato Bowl). He started 11 out of 12 games at defensive tackle, making 46 tackles (8.5 for loss), 2 sacks, 3 quarterback hurries, 3 passes defensed and one fumble recovery,

== Professional career ==
=== Dallas Cowboys ===
Coe was signed as an undrafted free agent by the Dallas Cowboys after the 2016 NFL draft on May 6. He was released by the Cowboys during final roster cuts on September 3.

=== Tampa Bay Buccaneers ===
On September 14, 2016, Coe was signed to the Tampa Bay Buccaneers' practice squad. He was released on November 18, but was re-signed to the practice squad on November 29. He was released on December 27.

=== Jacksonville Jaguars ===
On December 29, 2016, Coe was signed to the Jacksonville Jaguars' practice squad.

=== Seattle Seahawks ===
On January 19, 2017, Coe signed a reserve/future contract with the Seattle Seahawks. On May 9, he was released by the Seahawks. He was re-signed on July 30. He was waived on September 2. He was re-signed to the Seahawks practice squad on October 25. He was promoted to the active roster on November 28. He was waived on December 12.

=== Detroit Lions ===
On December 13, 2017, Coe was claimed off waivers by the Detroit Lions. He wasn't re-signed, after he informed the team that he intended to take a year off of football.

== Personal life ==
His grandfather Charlie Coe had over 40 years of coaching experience in the NFL and in college. His uncle Michael Coe also played in the NFL.
