= Deji Olatoye =

American football player (born 1991)

No. 29, 30, 32, 39
- Position: Cornerback

Personal information
- Born: July 20, 1991 (age 35); Cleveland, Ohio, U.S.
- Listed height: 6 ft 1 in (1.85 m)
- Listed weight: 194 lb (88 kg)

Career information
- High school: Scioto (Dublin, Ohio)
- College: North Carolina A&T
- NFL draft: 2014: undrafted

Career history
- Baltimore Ravens (2014)*; Kansas City Chiefs (2014–2015)*; Dallas Cowboys (2015); Atlanta Falcons (2016–2017); Tampa Bay Buccaneers (2017); Atlanta Falcons (2017); Orlando Apollos (2019); Houston Roughnecks (2020)
- * Offseason or practice squad member only

Career NFL statistics
- Total tackles: 17
- Pass deflections: 4
- Interceptions: 1
- Stats at Pro Football Reference

Ayodeji Olatoye (born July 20, 1991) is an American former professional football player who was a cornerback in the National Football League (NFL). He played college football for the North Carolina A&T Aggies. He was signed by the Baltimore Ravens as an undrafted free agent in 2014.

== Early life ==
Olatoye attended Dublin Scioto High School in Dublin, Ohio. While there he was a three-year letterman. He also earned All-Central District Division II honors. As a senior, he played in seven games and recorded 49 tackles and one interception which was returned for a touchdown.

In addition to football, Olatoye lettered in basketball three times and was the team's starting power forward as a senior. He also lettered in soccer and track and field. In track, he set the school record in the high jump with a mark of 6-foot, 4-inches and also ran the third leg in the 4 × 400 metres relay.

== College career ==
Olatoye accepted a football scholarship from the University of Colorado, where he graduated from with a degree in mass communications. He redshirted his first season in 2009.

As a freshman in 2010, he recorded six special teams tackles and one forced fumble. As a sophomore in 2011, he posted 10 tackles and one pass defensed in four games.

As a junior in 2012, Olatoye transferred to North Carolina A&T. He started 10 games, tallying 30 tackles, seven passes defensed, three interceptions, and two fumble recoveries.

As a senior in 2013, he played in 11 games making 39 tackles, two interceptions and 11 passes defensed. He was a member of a defense that allowed 277.9 total yards-per-game, including 187.6 passing, and just 16.8 points-per-game.

== Professional career ==
Pre-draft measurables
Height	Weight	40-yard dash	10-yard split	20-yard split	20-yard shuttle	Three-cone drill	Vertical jump	Broad jump	Bench press
6 ft 1 in (1.85 m)	198 lb (90 kg)	4.46 s	1.57 s	2.59 s	4.32 s	7.12 s	35 1/2 in (0.90 m)	10 ft 9 in (3.28 m)	13 reps
All values from Oklahoma pro day.

=== Baltimore Ravens ===
Olatoye was signed as an undrafted free agent by the Baltimore Ravens after the 2014 NFL draft on May 12. He was waived on August 25 and signed to the practice squad. He was released on September 3.

=== Kansas City Chiefs ===
On October 8, 2014, the Kansas City Chiefs signed Olatoye to their practice squad after Phillip Gaines and Chris Owens suffered injuries. On December 30, he was re-signed by the Chiefs to a reserve/futures contract. On September 5, 2015, Olatoye was waived by the Chiefs and was re-signed to the practice squad. He was cut from the practice squad on September 8.

=== Dallas Cowboys ===
On September 9, 2015, Olatoye was signed to the Dallas Cowboys' practice squad. After releasing defensive back Corey White, the Cowboys promoted him to the active roster on November 18. His first start came in the fifteenth game of the season against the Buffalo Bills in place of an injured Morris Claiborne. He registered five tackles, one pass defensed and an interception.

In 2016, Olatoye was used at cornerback and safety during training camp. He was having a solid preseason until the last game against the Houston Texans, when he struggled after being targeted by the opposing quarterbacks. On September 3, he was released after being passed on the depth chart by Dax Swanson.

=== Atlanta Falcons ===
On September 5, 2016, the Atlanta Falcons signed Olatoye to their practice squad. He was promoted to the active roster on November 23. Olatoye and the Falcons reached Super Bowl LI, where they faced the New England Patriots. In the final, he had two total tackles as the Falcons fell in a 34–28 overtime defeat.

On September 21, 2017, Olatoye was waived by the Falcons.

=== Tampa Bay Buccaneers ===
On October 25, 2017, Olatoye signed with the Tampa Bay Buccaneers. He was waived by the Buccaneers on November 7. Olatoye was re-signed on November 29. He was waived again on December 12.

=== Atlanta Falcons (second stint) ===
On December 14, 2017, Olatoye was signed by the Atlanta Falcons to replace cornerback C. J. Goodwin and provide depth. He was waived on December 29.

=== Orlando Apollos ===
In 2019, Olatoye joined the Orlando Apollos of the Alliance of American Football. He was placed on the injured reserve list before the start of the season and later was activated on March 5. The league ceased operations in April 2019.

=== Houston Roughnecks ===
Olatoye was selected in the first round during phase four in the 2020 XFL Draft by the Houston Roughnecks. In March, amid the COVID-19 pandemic, the league announced that it would be cancelling the rest of the season. Playing in all five games, he registered four tackles and no interceptions. He had his contract terminated when the league suspended operations on April 10, 2020.

== Personal life ==
Olatoye was born to Nigerian immigrants. His younger sister, Oyesade, was a three-time state champion thrower at Dublin Coffman High School. She is also the Ohio State University record holder in the indoor weight throw and represented the United States at the Junior World Championships in 2016 in Poland.
