= 2015 Dallas Cowboys season =

56th season in franchise history

- Owner: Jerry Jones
- General manager: Jerry Jones
- Head coach: Jason Garrett
- Home stadium: AT&T Stadium

Results
- Record: 4–12
- Division place: 4th NFC East
- Playoffs: Did not qualify
- All-Pros: Dan Bailey (2nd team); Travis Frederick (2nd team); Zack Martin (2nd team); Tyron Smith (2nd team)
- Pro Bowlers: Dan Bailey PK; Travis Frederick C Sean Lee OLB; Zack Martin OG; Tyron Smith OT

Uniform
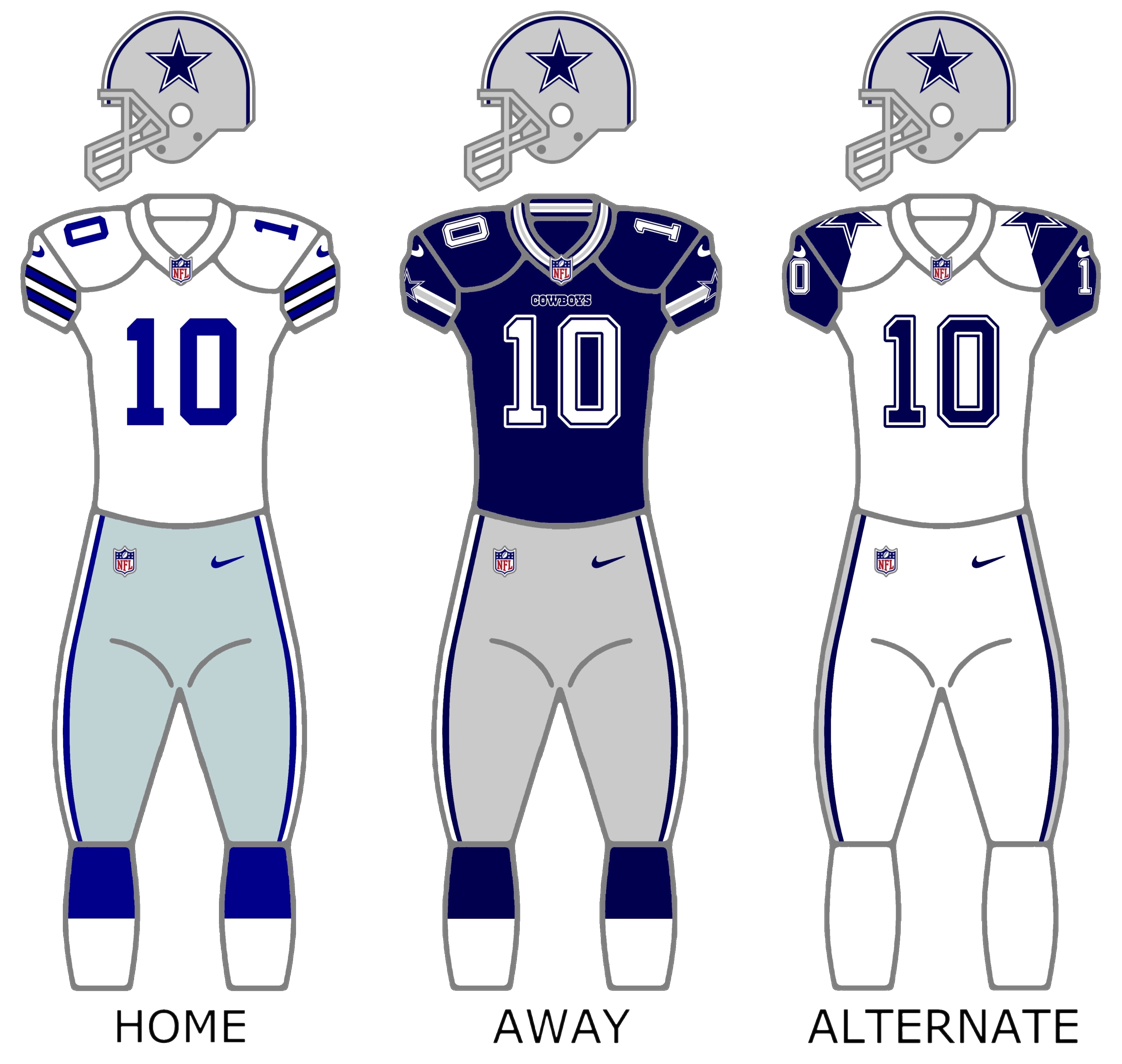

The 2015 season was the Dallas Cowboys' 56th in the National Football League (NFL), their seventh playing home games at AT&T Stadium and their fifth full season under head coach Jason Garrett. They finished the regular season with a 4–12 record, which was their first losing season since 2010, their worst since 1989, when they went 1–15, and the first time (and, as of the 2025 season, only time) the Cowboys finished in last place in the NFC East since 2002.

Despite starting 2–0, they would struggle immensely. Key injuries, including starting quarterback Tony Romo were factors in their struggles of the season. They were eliminated from playoff contention with their Week 15 loss to the New York Jets. This would be the last losing season for the Cowboys until 2020.

== Offseason ==
=== Staff transactions ===
- Head coach Jason Garrett remains head coach signing a five-year $30 million contract
- Defensive coordinator Rod Marinelli resigned to a three-year contract

=== Players transactions ===
- Resigned wide receiver Dez Bryant to a five-year $70 million contract
- Resigned right tackle Doug Free to a three-year contract
- RB Demarco Murray departed signing a five-year contract with the Philadelphia Eagles

=== 2015 draft class ===
2015 Dallas Cowboys draft
Round	Pick	Player	Position	College	Notes
1	27	Byron Jones *	Cornerback	UConn	
2	60	Randy Gregory	Defensive end	Nebraska	
3	91	Chaz Green	Offensive tackle	Florida	
4	127	Damien Wilson	Linebacker	Minnesota	
5	163	Ryan Russell	Defensive end	Purdue	
7	236	Mark Nzeocha	Linebacker	Wyoming	from San Diego
7	243	Laurence Gibson	Offensive tackle	Virginia Tech	from Baltimore
7	246	Geoff Swaim	Tight end	Texas	from Indianapolis via San Francisco
Made roster * Made at least one Pro Bowl during career

Notes

- The Cowboys traded their sixth-round selection (No. 204 overall) to the Baltimore Ravens in exchange for the Ravens' seventh-round selection (No. 243 overall) and linebacker Rolando McClain.
- The Cowboys traded their original seventh-round selection (No. 244 overall) to the Indianapolis Colts in exchange for defensive end Caesar Rayford.
- The Cowboys acquired an additional seventh-round selection (No. 236 overall) in a trade that sent defensive tackle Sean Lissemore to the San Diego Chargers.
- Dallas acquired another additional seventh-round selection (No. 246 overall) in exchange for their sixth-round pick in 2016.

=== Undrafted free agents ===
Name	Position	College
George Farmer	Wide receiver	USC
Antwan Goodley	Wide receiver	Baylor
Deontay Greenberry	Wide receiver	Houston
Joel Ross	Cornerback	Appalachian State
Tim Scott	Cornerback	North Carolina
Jameill Showers	Quarterback	UTEP
Ray Vinopal	Safety	Pittsburgh
Lucky Whitehead	Wide receiver	Florida Atlantic

== Regular season ==
Despite starting the season 2–0 and leading the NFC East, the Cowboys lost their next seven games and finished the season by going 2–12 in their final 14 games. They were eliminated from playoff contention following a loss to the New York Jets in week 15. Their collapse from a solid start was primarily due to injuries to starting quarterback Tony Romo and starting wide receiver Dez Bryant. Bryant broke a bone in his foot during the week 1 win against the Giants, and Romo suffered a broken clavicle in the week 2 triumph at Philadelphia. Brandon Weeden started the next 3 games, which the team lost, and then was benched in week 7 following the bye week in favor of Matt Cassel, who was acquired via trade from the Buffalo Bills following Romo's injury. The Cowboys, with Cassell at the helm, lost their next 4 games. Tony Romo, not fully recovered from his broken collarbone injury, started the next game against the Dolphins, which they won. However, in a week 12 loss against the undefeated Panthers, Romo suffered a second collarbone injury and was later ruled out for the season. Matt Cassel then started the next 3 games for the Cowboys with a week 13 win against the rival Redskins. But after a poor performance against the New York Jets in week 15 in the 1st half, Cassel was benched in favor of backup Kellen Moore, and the team went on to lose the rest of the games of the season.

== Staff ==
2015 Dallas Cowboys staff
Front office: Owner/president/general manager – Jerry Jones; COO/executive vice president/director of player personnel – Stephen Jones; Assistant director of player personnel – Will McClay; Assistant Director of college scouting – Tom Ciskowski; Assistant Director of pro scouting – Judd Garrett; Director of football administration – Todd Williams; Head coaches: Head coach – Jason Garrett; Offensive coaches: Offensive coordinator – Scott Linehan; Quarterbacks – Wade Wilson; Running backs – Gary Brown; Wide receivers – Derek Dooley; Assistant Wide receivers – Kyle Valero; Tight ends – Mike Pope; Offensive line – Frank Pollack; Assistant offensive line – Marc Colombo; Senior coaching consultant/Offensive Consultant – Jimmy Robinson; Offensive assistant – Kevin Carberry	Defensive coaches: Defensive coordinator/Defensive line – Rod Marinelli; Linebackers – Matt Eberflus; Secondary – Jerome Henderson; Assistant secondary – Joe Baker; Defensive assistant – Turner West; Defensive assistant/defensive line – Leon Lett; Defensive quality control/linebackers – Ben Bloom; Special teams coaches: Special teams coordinator – Rich Bisaccia; Assistant special teams/kickers – Keith O'Quinn; Strength and conditioning: Strength and conditioning – Mike Woicik; Assistant strength and conditioning – Brett Bech; Assistant strength and conditioning – Kendall Smith

== Rosters ==
=== Opening preseason roster ===
Dallas Cowboys 2015 opening preseason roster
Quarterbacks: 9 Tony Romo; 7 Jameill Showers; 10 Dustin Vaughan; 3 Brandon Weeden; Running backs: 48 Ray Agnew III FB; 44 Tyler Clutts FB; 25 Lance Dunbar; 37 Gus Johnson; 21 Joseph Randle; 30 Lache Seastrunk; Wide receivers: 11 Cole Beasley; 88 Dez Bryant; 14 Reggie Dunn; 19 George Farmer; 85 Antwan Goodley; 81 Deontay Greenberry; 17 Nick Harwell; 16 A. J. Jenkins; 15 Devin Street; 13 Lucky Whitehead; 83 Terrance Williams; Tight ends: 80 Brandon Barden; 89 Gavin Escobar; 84 James Hanna; 87 Geoff Swaim; 82 Jason Witten	Offensive linemen: 73 Mackenzy Bernadeau C/G; 69 Cody Clay G/T; 71 La'el Collins G/T; 74 R. J. Dill G/T; 72 Travis Frederick C; 68 Doug Free T; 67 Laurence Gibson T; 65 Ronald Leary G; 70 Zack Martin G; 62 Shane McDermott C; 78 Ronald Patrick G/C; 77 Tyron Smith T; 75 Darrion Weems T; 61 John Wetzel T/G; Defensive linemen: 66 Ken Bishop DT; 79 Kenneth Boatright DE; 60 Davon Coleman DT; 58 Jack Crawford DT/DE; 98 Tyrone Crawford DT; 95 Lavar Edwards DE; 93 Ben Gardner DE; 94 Randy Gregory DE; 76 Greg Hardy DE/DT; 96 Nick Hayden DT; 90 DeMarcus Lawrence DE; 97 Terrell McClain DT; 92 Jeremy Mincey DE; 63 Efe Obada DE; 99 Ryan Russell DE/DT	Linebackers: 46 Donnie Baggs OLB; 54 Jasper Brinkley MLB; 45 Jonathan Brown OLB/MLB; 52 Andrew Gachkar OLB; 47 Ka'Lial Glaud MLB/OLB; 59 Anthony Hitchens OLB/MLB; 50 Sean Lee OLB/MLB; 56 Keith Smith OLB; 51 Kyle Wilber OLB/DE; 57 Damien Wilson OLB/MLB; Defensive backs: 39 Brandon Carr CB; 42 Barry Church FS; 24 Morris Claiborne CB; 38 Jeff Heath SS; 31 Byron Jones CB/FS; 40 Danny McCray FS; 26 Tyler Patmon CB; 29 Joel Ross CB; 32 Orlando Scandrick CB; 41 Tim Scott FS; 35 Brandon Smith CB; 28 Robert Steeples CB; 36 Ray Vinopal SS/FS; 23 Corey White CB/FS; 27 J. J. Wilcox SS; Special teams: 5 Dan Bailey K; 1 Tom Hornsey P; 6 Chris Jones P; 49 Casey Kreiter LS; 91 L. P. Ladouceur LS	Reserve lists: -- Reshod Fortenberry G/T (IR); 79 Chaz Green T (Active/PUP); -- Justin Jackson OLB (IR); -- Cameron Lawrence OLB/MLB (IR); 55 Rolando McClain MLB (Active/PUP); 20 Darren McFadden RB (Active/PUP); -- Ryan Miller T/G (IR); 53 Mark Nzeocha OLB (Active/NF-Inj.); 43 Will Smith OLB (IR); 64 Chris Whaley DT (IR); 34 Ryan Williams RB (IR); 33 Jason Wilson CB (IR); 89 active, 8 inactive

=== Week one roster ===
Dallas Cowboys 2015 week one roster
Quarterbacks: 9 Tony Romo; 3 Brandon Weeden; Running backs: 44 Tyler Clutts FB; 25 Lance Dunbar KR; 20 Darren McFadden; 30 Christine Michael; 21 Joseph Randle; Wide receivers: 11 Cole Beasley PR; 88 Dez Bryant; 15 Devin Street; 13 Lucky Whitehead; 83 Terrance Williams; Tight ends: 89 Gavin Escobar; 84 James Hanna; 87 Geoff Swaim; 82 Jason Witten	Offensive linemen: 73 Mackenzy Bernadeau C/G; 71 La'el Collins G/T; 72 Travis Frederick C; 68 Doug Free T; 65 Ronald Leary G; 70 Zack Martin G; 67 Jordan Mills T; 77 Tyron Smith T; 75 Darrion Weems T; Defensive linemen: 93 Ken Bishop DT; 60 Davon Coleman DT; 58 Jack Crawford DT/DE; 98 Tyrone Crawford DT; 94 Randy Gregory DE; 96 Nick Hayden DT; 90 DeMarcus Lawrence DE; 97 Terrell McClain DT; 92 Jeremy Mincey DE; 99 Ryan Russell DE/DT	Linebackers: 52 Andrew Gachkar MLB/OLB; 59 Anthony Hitchens OLB/MLB; 50 Sean Lee OLB/MLB; 56 Keith Smith OLB; 51 Kyle Wilber OLB/DE; 57 Damien Wilson OLB/MLB; Defensive backs: 39 Brandon Carr CB; 42 Barry Church SS; 24 Morris Claiborne CB; 38 Jeff Heath SS; 31 Byron Jones CB/FS; 40 Danny McCray FS; 26 Tyler Patmon CB; 23 Corey White CB/FS; 27 J. J. Wilcox FS; Special teams: 5 Dan Bailey K; 6 Chris Jones P; 91 L. P. Ladouceur LS	Reserve lists: -- Kenneth Boatright DE (IR); 69 Cody Clay G/T (IR); 74 R. J. Dill G/T (IR); -- Reshod Fortenberry G/T (IR); 47 Ka'Lial Glaud MLB/OLB (IR); 79 Chaz Green T (PUP); 76 Greg Hardy DE/DT (Susp.); 34 Michael Hill RB (IR); -- Cameron Lawrence OLB/MLB (IR); 55 Rolando McClain MLB (Susp.); -- Ryan Miller T/G (IR); 53 Mark Nzeocha OLB (NF-Inj.); 32 Orlando Scandrick CB (IR); -- Rod Sweeting CB (IR); -- Chris Whaley DT (IR); -- Ryan Williams RB (IR); Practice squad: 43 Dakorey Johnson OLB; 37 Gus Johnson RB; 85 Vince Mayle WR; 17 Kellen Moore QB; 29 Deji Olatoye CB; 41 Tim Scott FS; 7 Jameill Showers QB; 14 Rodney Smith WR; 48 Joe Thomas MLB; 61 John Wetzel T/G; 53 active, 16 inactive, 10 practice squad

=== Final roster ===
Dallas Cowboys 2015 final roster
Quarterbacks: 16 Matt Cassel; 17 Kellen Moore; 7 Jameill Showers; Running backs: 44 Tyler Clutts FB; 20 Darren McFadden; 45 Rod Smith; 23 Robert Turbin; Wide receivers: 11 Cole Beasley; 19 Brice Butler; 85 Vince Mayle; 14 Rodney Smith; 15 Devin Street; 13 Lucky Whitehead; 83 Terrance Williams; Tight ends: 84 James Hanna; 87 Geoff Swaim; 82 Jason Witten	Offensive linemen: 73 Mackenzy Bernadeau G/C; 78 Charles Brown T; 71 La'el Collins G; 72 Travis Frederick C; 68 Doug Free T; 79 Chaz Green T/G; 65 Ronald Leary G; 70 Zack Martin G; 77 Tyron Smith T; Defensive linemen: 58 Jack Crawford DE; 98 Tyrone Crawford DT; 94 Randy Gregory DE; 76 Greg Hardy DE; 96 Nick Hayden DT; 90 DeMarcus Lawrence DE; 92 Jeremy Mincey DE; 63 Casey Walker DT	Linebackers: 52 Andrew Gachkar OLB; 59 Anthony Hitchens OLB/MLB; 50 Sean Lee OLB; 55 Rolando McClain MLB; 53 Mark Nzeocha OLB; 51 Kyle Wilber OLB; 57 Damien Wilson OLB/MLB; Defensive backs: 39 Brandon Carr CB; 24 Morris Claiborne CB; 38 Jeff Heath SS; 31 Byron Jones FS/CB; 40 Danny McCray SS; 21 Terrance Mitchell CB; 29 Deji Olatoye CB; 26 Josh Thomas CB; 27 J. J. Wilcox FS/SS; Special teams: 5 Dan Bailey K; 6 Chris Jones P; 91 L. P. Ladouceur LS	Reserve lists: -- Kenneth Boatright DE (IR); 88 Dez Bryant WR (IR); 42 Barry Church SS (IR); 25 Lance Dunbar RB (IR); 89 Gavin Escobar TE (IR); 95 David Irving DT/DE (IR); 97 Terrell McClain DT (IR); 9 Tony Romo QB (IR); 99 Ryan Russell DE (IR); 32 Orlando Scandrick CB (IR); 67 Chris Whaley DT (IR); Practice squad: 54 Derek Akunne OLB; 81 Donte Foster WR; 35 Buddy Jackson CB; 61 Antonio Johnson G; 33 Ben Malena RB; 66 Mike McAdoo DE; 36 Brandon McGee CB; 93 Efe Obada DE; 56 Keith Smith OLB; 75 Darrion Weems T; 53 active, 11 inactive, 10 practice squad

== Schedule ==
=== Preseason ===
Week	Date	Opponent	Result	Record	Game site	NFL.com recap
1	August 13	at San Diego Chargers	**L** 7–17	0–1	Qualcomm Stadium	Recap
2	August 23	at San Francisco 49ers	**L** 6–23	0–2	Levi's Stadium	Recap
3	August 29	Minnesota Vikings	**L** 14–28	0–3	AT&T Stadium	Recap
4	September 3	Houston Texans	**W** 21–14	1–3	AT&T Stadium	Recap

=== Regular season ===
Week	Date	Opponent	Result	Record	Game site	NFL.com recap
1	September 13	**New York Giants**	**W** 27–26	1–0	AT&T Stadium	Recap
2	September 20	at **Philadelphia Eagles**	**W** 20–10	2–0	Lincoln Financial Field	Recap
3	September 27	Atlanta Falcons	**L** 28–39	2–1	AT&T Stadium	Recap
4	October 4	at New Orleans Saints	**L** 20–26 (OT)	2–2	Mercedes-Benz Superdome	Recap
5	October 11	New England Patriots	**L** 6–30	2–3	AT&T Stadium	Recap
6	Bye					
7	October 25	at **New York Giants**	**L** 20–27	2–4	MetLife Stadium	Recap
8	November 1	Seattle Seahawks	**L** 12–13	2–5	AT&T Stadium	Recap
9	November 8	**Philadelphia Eagles**	**L** 27–33 (OT)	2–6	AT&T Stadium	Recap
10	November 15	at Tampa Bay Buccaneers	**L** 6–10	2–7	Raymond James Stadium	Recap
11	November 22	at Miami Dolphins	**W** 24–14	3–7	Sun Life Stadium	Recap
12	November 26	Carolina Panthers	**L** 14–33	3–8	AT&T Stadium	Recap
13	December 7	at **Washington Redskins**	**W** 19–16	4–8	FedExField	Recap
14	December 13	at Green Bay Packers	**L** 7–28	4–9	Lambeau Field	Recap
15	December 19	New York Jets	**L** 16–19	4–10	AT&T Stadium	Recap
16	December 27	at Buffalo Bills	**L** 6–16	4–11	Ralph Wilson Stadium	Recap
17	January 3	**Washington Redskins**	**L** 23–34	4–12	AT&T Stadium	Recap

Note: Intra-division opponents are in bold text.

=== Game summaries ===
==== Week 1: vs. New York Giants ====
Week One: New York Giants at Dallas Cowboys – Game summary

Quarter	1	2	3	4	Total
Giants	3	10	3	10	**26**
**Cowboys**	3	3	7	14	**27**

at AT&T Stadium, Arlington, Texas

- Date: September 13
- Game time: 7:30 p.m. CDT
- Game weather: Played indoors (retractable roof closed)
- Game attendance: 93,579
- Referee: Bill Vinovich
- TV announcers (NBC): Al Michaels, Cris Collinsworth and Michele Tafoya
- Recap, Gamebook

Game information

**First quarter**

- DAL – Dan Bailey 21-yard field goal, 4:36. Cowboys 3–0. **Drive: 17 plays, 79 yards, 10:27.**
- NYG – Josh Brown 50-yard field goal, 2:03. Tied 3–3. **Drive: 8 plays, 48 yards, 2:35.**

**Second quarter**

- DAL – Dan Bailey 32-yard field goal, 5:35. Cowboys 6–3. **Drive: 9 plays, 49 yards, 5:22.**
- NYG – Dominique Rodgers-Cromartie 57-yard fumble return (Josh Brown kick), 1:12. Giants 10–6.
- NYG – Josh Brown 40-yard field goal, 0:19. Giants 13–6. **Drive: 6 plays, 14 yards, 0:32.**

**Third quarter**

- NYG – Josh Brown 30-yard field goal, 9:52. Giants 16–6. **Drive: 12 plays, 68 yards, 5:12.**
- DAL – Gavin Escobar 2-yard pass from Tony Romo (Dan Bailey kick), 4:08. Giants 16–13. **Drive: 9 plays, 80 yards, 5:47.**

**Fourth quarter**

- NYG – Rashad Jennings 1-yard run (Josh Brown kick), 8:09. Giants 23–13. **Drive: 1 play, 1 yard, 0:08.**
- DAL – Jason Witten 1-yard pass from Tony Romo (Dan Bailey kick), 5:11. Giants 23–20. **Drive: 6 plays, 76 yards, 2:53.**
- NYG – Josh Brown 19-yard field goal, 1:37. Giants 26–20. **Drive: 13 plays, 79 yards, 3:34.**
- DAL – Jason Witten 11-yard pass from Tony Romo (Dan Bailey kick), 0:13. Cowboys 27–26. **Drive: 6 plays, 72 yards, 1:27.**

**Top passers**

- NYG – Eli Manning – 20/36, 189 yards
- DAL – Tony Romo – 36/45, 356 yards, 3 TD, 2 INT

**Top rushers**

- NYG – Rashad Jennings – 13 rushes, 52 yards, TD
- DAL – Joseph Randle – 16 rushes, 65 yards

**Top receivers**

- NYG – Shane Vereen – 4 receptions, 45 yards
- DAL – Lance Dunbar – 8 receptions, 70 yards

**Top tacklers**

- NYG – Uani 'Unga - 10 tackles, 2 assists
- DAL – Sean Lee - 7 tackles, 2 assists

The Cowboys opened the season at home against their rival, the New York Giants, led by the quarterback-receiver tandem of Eli Manning and young Odell Beckham Jr.

Tony Romo came back late in the fourth quarter and nailed the game-winning drive to Jason Witten to give Dallas a narrow 27-26 victory.

The victory, however, was bittersweet as Dez Bryant broke his foot in the second half. The injury required surgery and he was expected to miss 10–12 weeks. Cameras caught Bryant congratulating his teammates in the locker room after a close victory. Romo spoke on Bryant's injury: "You can't replace Dez Bryant." Three days later, the NFL came forward and apologized to the Giants for 2 blown calls. The first call led to a Cowboys touchdown due to a wrong pass interference call which set up the Cowboys on 1st and Goal on the 2 yard line, and the second was a blown defensive holding call which would have set up the Giants on first and goal with the Cowboys having no timeouts remaining and 1:36 left on the clock.

==== Week 2: at Philadelphia Eagles ====
Week Two: Dallas Cowboys at Philadelphia Eagles – Game summary

Quarter	1	2	3	4	Total
**Cowboys**	3	3	7	7	**20**
Eagles	0	0	0	10	**10**

at Lincoln Financial Field, Philadelphia, Pennsylvania

- Date: September 20
- Game time: 4:25 p.m. EDT/3:25 p.m. CDT
- Game weather: 77 °F (25 °C), partly cloudy
- Game attendance: 69,296
- Referee: Tony Corrente
- TV announcers (Fox): Joe Buck, Troy Aikman and Erin Andrews
- Recap, Gamebook

Game information

**First quarter**

- DAL – Dan Bailey 20-yard field goal, 1:42. Cowboys 3–0. **Drive: 12 plays, 79 yards, 6:04.**

**Second quarter**

- DAL – Dan Bailey 28-yard field goal, 0:02. Cowboys 6–0. **Drive: 15 plays, 79 yards, 5:24.**

**Third quarter**

- DAL - Donnie Jones punt blocked by Danny McCray, 26-yard return by Kyle Wilber (Dan Bailey kick), 12:44. Cowboys 13–0.

**Fourth quarter**

- PHI – Cody Parkey 46-yard field goal, 14:21. Cowboys 13–3. **Drive: 8 plays, 52 yards, 2:16.**
- DAL – Terrance Williams 42-yard pass from Brandon Weeden (Dan Bailey kick), 4:20. Cowboys 20–3. **Drive: 3 plays, 41 yards, 0:16.**
- PHI – Jordan Matthews 6-yard pass from Sam Bradford (Cody Parkey kick), 1:26. Cowboys 20–10. **Drive: 11 plays, 80 yards, 2:52.**

**Top passers**

- DAL – Tony Romo – 18/27, 195 yards
- PHI – Sam Bradford – 23/37, 224 yards, TD, 2 INT

**Top rushers**

- DAL – Joseph Randle – 18 rushes, 51 yards
- PHI – Sam Bradford – 2 rushes, 9 yards

**Top receivers**

- DAL – Terrance Williams – 4 receptions, 84 yards, TD
- PHI – Jordan Matthews – 6 receptions, 80 yards, TD

**Top tacklers**

- DAL – Sean Lee - 9 tackles, 5 assists, INT
- PHI – Malcolm Jenkins - 8 tackles

Shining atop the division, the Cowboys played their divisional rivals, the Philadelphia Eagles in what turned out to be a defensive juggernaut of a game. Neither team could really get anything going on offense; however, the Cowboys were able to pull away by dominating the time of possession. Already missing starting wide receiver Dez Bryant, the Cowboys experienced a devastating loss when Tony Romo was sacked by Jordan Hicks. The result of the hit was a fractured collarbone and an expected eight-week absence. The fractured collarbone is the same one Romo broke in 2010. Backup Brandon Weeden got his first taste of game time this season, completing all of his 7 passes for a total of 73 yards and one touchdown. Despite the injuries to the two key players, the Cowboys still managed to hold off the Eagles with a 20-10 victory, ultimately stunning Philadelphia's home crowd. Dallas's defense harassed Sam Bradford and ex-Cowboy DeMarco Murray all game, holding Murray to a measly 2 yards on 13 carries. Sean Lee, a defensive powerhouse, finished the game with 14 tackles and an interception for the Cowboys. For his performance, Lee was given the honor of being named NFC Defensive Player of the Week.

==== Week 3: vs. Atlanta Falcons ====
Week Three: Atlanta Falcons at Dallas Cowboys – Game summary

Quarter	1	2	3	4	Total
**Falcons**	7	10	8	14	**39**
Cowboys	14	14	0	0	**28**

at AT&T Stadium, Arlington, Texas

- Date: September 27
- Game time: 12:00 p.m. CDT
- Game weather: Played indoors (retractable roof closed)
- Game attendance: 90,345
- Referee: Pete Morelli
- TV announcers (Fox): Joe Buck, Troy Aikman and Erin Andrews
- Recap, Gamebook

Game information

**First quarter**

- DAL – Joseph Randle 37-yard run (Dan Bailey kick), 14:03. Cowboys 7–0. **Drive: 2 plays, 80 yards, 1:08.**
- DAL – Joseph Randle 1-yard run (Dan Bailey kick), 7:12. Cowboys 14–0. **Drive: 8 plays, 77 yards, 4:37.**
- ATL – Devonta Freeman 3-yard run (Matt Bryant kick), 3:05. Cowboys 14–7. **Drive: 11 plays, 80 yards, 4:07.**

**Second quarter**

- DAL – Darren McFadden 2-yard run (Dan Bailey kick), 7:31. Cowboys 21–7. **Drive: 8 plays, 56 yards, 5:09.**
- ATL – Devonta Freeman 2-yard run (Matt Bryant kick), 2:23. Cowboys 21–14. **Drive: 7 plays, 23 yards, 3:32.**
- DAL – Joseph Randle 1-yard run (Dan Bailey kick), 0:46. Cowboys 28–14. **Drive: 6 plays, 80 yards, 1:38.**
- ATL – Matt Bryant 32-yard field goal, 0:05. Cowboys 28–17. **Drive: 6 plays, 66 yards, 0:40.**

**Third quarter**

- ATL – Julio Jones 45-yard pass from Matt Ryan (Levine Toilolo pass from Matt Ryan), 7:16. Cowboys 28–25. **Drive: 6 plays, 87 yards, 3:15.**

**Fourth quarter**

- ATL – Devonta Freeman 7-yard run (Matt Bryant kick), 11:30. Falcons 32–28. **Drive: 11 plays, 89 yards, 6:44.**
- ATL – Julio Jones 2-yard pass from Matt Ryan (Matt Bryant kick), 3:09. Falcons 39–28. **Drive: 11 plays, 62 yards, 6:14.**

**Top passers**

- ATL – Matt Ryan – 24/36, 285 yards, 2 TD
- DAL – Brandon Weeden – 22/26, 232 yards, INT

**Top rushers**

- ATL – Devonta Freeman – 30 rushes, 141 yards, 3 TD
- DAL – Joseph Randle – 14 rushes, 87 yards, 3 TD

**Top receivers**

- ATL – Julio Jones – 12 receptions, 164 yards, 2 TD
- DAL – Lance Dunbar – 10 receptions, 100 yards

**Top tacklers**

- ATL – Justin Durant - 8 tackles, 1 assist
- DAL – Sean Lee - 7 tackles, 3 assists

Many questions surrounded the Dallas Cowboys as they entered Week 3, especially regarding how the team would respond to having neither Dez Bryant nor Tony Romo. Coach Jason Garrett's mantra of “next man up” played a big part in preparing for the game against the Atlanta Falcons.

Backup quarterback Brandon Weeden started for the first time since the previous season's game against the Arizona Cardinals, completing 22 of 26 passes for 232 yards and one interception with no touchdowns.

The Cowboys played very well in the first half, outscoring the Falcons 28-17; however, the Falcons made a few halftime adjustments that squashed any running game the Cowboys pursued afterwards. On the other hand, the Cowboys had no answer for Julio Jones, who caught for 164 yards and 2 touchdowns. Owner Jerry Jones said after the game that the Cowboys just looked tired in the second half. The Falcons eventually came back late in the second half and won the game 39-28.

==== Week 4: at New Orleans Saints ====
Week Four: Dallas Cowboys at New Orleans Saints – Game summary

Quarter	1	2	3	4	OT	Total
Cowboys	3	7	3	7	0	**20**
**Saints**	7	0	6	7	6	**26**

at Mercedes-Benz Superdome, New Orleans, Louisiana

- Date: October 4
- Game time: 7:30 p.m. CDT
- Game weather: Played indoors (dome stadium)
- Game attendance: 73,009
- Referee: Brad Allen
- TV announcers (NBC): Al Michaels, Cris Collinsworth and Michele Tafoya
- Recap, Gamebook

Game information

**First quarter**

- DAL – Dan Bailey 30-yard field goal, 9:46. Cowboys 3–0. **Drive: 8 plays, 74 yards, 4:19.**
- NO – Josh Hill 3-yard pass from Drew Brees (Zach Hocker kick), 3:52. Saints 7–3. **Drive: 11 plays, 80 yards, 5:53.**

**Second quarter**

- DAL – Joseph Randle 1-yard run (Dan Bailey kick), 13:37. Cowboys 10–7. **Drive: 10 plays, 80 yards, 5:13.**

**Third quarter**

- NO – Zach Hocker 51-yard field goal, 11:24. Tied 10–10. **Drive: 4 plays, 5 yards, 1:23.**
- DAL – Dan Bailey 38-yard field goal, 8:25. Cowboys 13–10. **Drive: 8 plays, 60 yards, 2:59.**
- NO – Zach Hocker 29-yard field goal, 1:30. Tied 13–13. **Drive: 13 plays, 69 yards, 6:54.**

**Fourth quarter**

- NO – Khiry Robinson 1-yard run (Zach Hocker kick), 8:02. Saints 20–13. **Drive: 11 plays, 67 yards, 4:45.**
- DAL – Terrance Williams 17-yard pass from Brandon Weeden (Dan Bailey kick), 1:56. Tied 20–20. **Drive: 8 plays, 91 yards, 2:14.**

**Overtime**

- NO – C. J. Spiller 80-yard pass from Drew Brees, 14:57. Saints 26–20. **Drive: 2 plays, 80 yards, 0:13.**

**Top passers**

- DAL – Brandon Weeden – 16/26, 246 yards, TD
- NO – Drew Brees – 33/41, 359 yards, 2 TD

**Top rushers**

- DAL – Lance Dunbar – 3 rushes, 54 yards
- NO – Mark Ingram II – 17 rushes, 77 yards

**Top receivers**

- DAL – Brice Butler – 1 reception, 67 yards
- NO – C. J. Spiller – 5 receptions, 99 yards, TD

**Top tacklers**

- DAL – Anthony Hitchens – 9 tackles, 2 assists (1 sack)
- NO – Hau'oli Kikaha – 4 tackles, 4 assists (1 sack)

In another heartbreaking loss which ended a 9-0 winning streak of regular season away games, the injury bug struck the Cowboys again. Sean Lee exited the game early with a concussion, Lance Dunbar saw the last of his playing time this season with a torn ACL, and Brice Butler injured his hamstring. Despite all the injuries, the Cowboys were able to stay neck and neck with the New Orleans Saints.

Enduring a few lead changes throughout the first four quarters, the Cowboys were able to come back and tie it up 20-20 with a last minute touchdown from Brandon Weeden (16/26; 246 yards; 1 TD) to Terrance Williams. However, the Cowboys defense was not able to hold off the Saints during overtime. An 80-yard touchdown was scored within the first 13 seconds of overtime, which handed the Cowboys their second loss of the season.

==== Week 5: vs. New England Patriots ====
Week Five: New England Patriots at Dallas Cowboys – Game summary

Quarter	1	2	3	4	Total
**Patriots**	3	10	7	10	**30**
Cowboys	3	0	3	0	**6**

at AT&T Stadium, Arlington, Texas

- Date: October 11
- Game time: 3:25 p.m. CDT
- Game weather: Played indoors (retractable roof closed)
- Game attendance: 93,054
- Referee: Clete Blakeman
- TV announcers (CBS): Jim Nantz, Phil Simms and Tracy Wolfson
- Recap, Gamebook

Game information

**First quarter**

- NE – Stephen Gostkowski 49-yard field goal, 8:19. Patriots 3–0. **Drive: 5 plays, 14 yards, 2:04.**
- DAL – Dan Bailey 51-yard field goal, 1:46. tied 3–3. **Drive: 10 plays, 47 yards, 6:33.**

**Second quarter**

- NE – Tom Brady 1-yard run (Stephen Gostkowski kick), 3:39. Patriots 10–3. **Drive: 7 plays, 55 yards, 2:18.**
- NE – Stephen Gostkowski 57-yard field goal, 0:03. Patriots 13–3. **Drive: 4 plays, 16 yards, 0:50.**

**Third quarter**

- NE – Dion Lewis 10-yard pass from Tom Brady, (Stephen Gostkowski kick), 9:48. Patriots 20–3. **Drive: 9 plays, 80 yards, 5:12.**
- DAL – Dan Bailey 23-yard field goal, 1:17. Patriots 20–6. **Drive: 15 plays, 75 yards, 8:31.**

**Fourth quarter**

- NE – Julian Edelman 59-yard pass from Tom Brady, (Stephen Gostkowski kick), 12:58. Patriots 27–6. **Drive: 5 plays, 80 yards, 3:19.**
- NE – Stephen Gostkowski 34-yard field goal, 4:41. Patriots 30–6. **Drive: 5 plays, 37 yards, 1:39.**

**Top passers**

- NE – Tom Brady – 20/27, 275 yards, 2 TD
- DAL – Brandon Weeden – 26/39, 188 yards, INT

**Top rushers**

- NE – LeGarrette Blount – 13 rushes, 74 yards
- DAL – Joseph Randle – 15 rushes, 60 yards

**Top receivers**

- NE – Julian Edelman – 4 receptions, 120 yards, TD
- DAL – Darren McFadden – 9 receptions, 62 yards

**Top tacklers**

- NE – Jamie Collins – 6 tackles, 4 assists
- DAL – Barry Church – 5 tackles, 3 assists

After back-to-back losses, Dallas returned home to face the then-undefeated defending Super Bowl champions, the New England Patriots.

Stout early defensive efforts kept the game close, including five sacks of Patriots quarterback Tom Brady, but Dallas's offense could never produce steady results. Dallas QB Brandon Weeden (1 INT) and the offensive line were ineffectual, gaining only 264 yards total offense and making 18 1st downs. The offense could manage only two Dan Bailey field goals.

During the first quarter, the Cowboys held the Patriots to a field goal. However, the Patriots slowly but surely pulled away afterwards for the 30-6 victory, handing Dallas the loss and a 2-3 record entering the bye week - and handing Cowboys head coach Jason Garrett his first career three-game losing streak.

==== Week 7: at New York Giants ====
Week Seven: Dallas Cowboys at New York Giants – Game summary

Quarter	1	2	3	4	Total
Cowboys	3	10	0	7	**20**
**Giants**	0	10	10	7	**27**

at MetLife Stadium, East Rutherford, New Jersey

- Date: October 25
- Game time: 4:25 p.m. EDT/3:25 p.m. CDT
- Game weather: 71 °F (22 °C), mostly cloudy
- Game attendance: 80,319
- Referee: John Parry
- TV announcers (Fox): Joe Buck, Troy Aikman and Erin Andrews
- Recap, Gamebook

Game information

**First quarter**

- DAL – Dan Bailey 30-yard field goal, 5:29. Cowboys 3–0. **Drive: 11 plays, 68 yards, 5:17.**

**Second quarter**

- NYG – Orleans Darkwa 15-yard run (Josh Brown kick), 11:10. Giants 7–3. **Drive: 7 plays, 79 yards, 3:05.**
- DAL – Dan Bailey 48-yard field goal, 7:36. Giants 7–6. **Drive: 6 plays, 30 yards, 3:33.**
- DAL – Darren McFadden 1-yard run (Dan Bailey kick), 2:22. Cowboys 13–7. **Drive: 6 plays, 72 yards, 3:19.**
- NYG – Josh Brown 47-yard field goal, 1:08. Cowboys 13–10. **Drive: 8 plays, 51 yards, 1:13.**

**Third quarter**

- NYG – Dominique Rodgers-Cromartie 58-yard interception return (Josh Brown kick), 11:34. Giants 17–13.
- NYG – Josh Brown 34-yard field goal, 3:23. Giants 20–13. **Drive: 8 plays, 83 yards, 4:25.**

**Fourth quarter**

- DAL – Devin Street 25-yard pass from Matt Cassel (Dan Bailey kick), 7:25. Tied 20–20. **Drive: 9 plays, 80 yards, 4:58.**
- NYG – Dwayne Harris 100-yard kickoff return (Josh Brown kick), 7:14. Giants 27-20.

**Top passers**

- DAL – Matt Cassel – 17/27, 227 yards, TD, 3 INT
- NYG – Eli Manning – 13/24, 170 yards

**Top rushers**

- DAL – Darren McFadden – 29 rushes, 152 yards, TD
- NYG – Shane Vereen – 4 rushes, 56 yards

**Top receivers**

- DAL – Jason Witten – 6 receptions, 73 yards
- NYG – Rueben Randle – 2 receptions, 68 yards

**Top tacklers**

- DAL – Sean Lee – 3 tackles, 6 assists
- NYG – Jon Beason – 7 tackles, 4 assists

Dallas took its perfect record in games against NFC East opponents to MetLife Stadium to face the New York Giants, and despite limiting a highly efficient Giants offense and Cassel making some clutch throws, The Giants dominance of the turnover margin and special teams spelled doom for the Cowboys as the Giants left with the 27-20 win.

Matt Cassel made his starting quarterback debut for Dallas passing for 227 yards and 1 touchdown, but his 3 interceptions - including one returned for a touchdown - led to ten Giants points. On the ground Dallas had consistent success all day with Darren McFadden substituting for mysteriously injured starter Joseph Randle and the offense accumulated 460 total yards vs. the Giants' 289.

Despite sloppy, penalty-ridden play helping enable three lead changes Dallas was able to tie the game at 20 when Cassel threw a beauty on a 25-yard touchdown pass to Devin Street who had an even better catch, tapping his feet inches from the end line. However, the Giants returned the ensuing kickoff for a touchdown, immediately regaining the lead. Later, a quick "three and out" by the Giants' offense preceded a Giants punt which was fumbled by Cole Beasley and recovered by the Giants, who then ran out the clock on subsequent "kneel downs" to finish the game.

The loss hands Dallas a four-game losing skid heading back home to face the defending NFC champion Seattle Seahawks.

==== Week 8: vs. Seattle Seahawks ====
Week Eight: Seattle Seahawks at Dallas Cowboys – Game summary

Quarter	1	2	3	4	Total
**Seahawks**	3	7	0	3	**13**
Cowboys	3	3	3	3	**12**

at AT&T Stadium, Arlington, Texas

- Date: November 1
- Game time: 3:25 p.m. CST
- Game weather: Played indoors (retractable roof closed)
- Game attendance: 91,486
- Referee: Carl Cheffers
- TV announcers (Fox): Thom Brennaman, Troy Aikman and Peter Schrager
- Recap, Gamebook

Game information

**First quarter**

- SEA – Steven Hauschka 26-yard field goal, 8:51. Seahawks 3–0. **Drive: 12 plays, 72 yards, 6:13.**
- DAL – Dan Bailey 33-yard field goal, 0:48. Tied 3–3. **Drive: 15 plays, 65 yards, 8:04.**

**Second quarter**

- SEA – Luke Willson 22-yard pass from Russell Wilson (Steven Hauschka kick), 5:33. Seahawks 10–3. **Drive: 7 plays, 65 yards, 3:38.**
- DAL – Dan Bailey 35-yard field goal, 1:38. Seahawks 10–6. **Drive: 10 plays, 63 yards, 3:55.**

**Third quarter**

- DAL – Dan Bailey 52-yard field goal, 8:56. Seahawks 10–9. **Drive: 12 plays, 46 yards, 6:09.**

**Fourth quarter**

- DAL – Dan Bailey 27-yard field goal, 14:32. Cowboys 12-10. **Drive: 4 plays, 7 yards, 0:48.**
- SEA – Steven Hauschka 24-yard field goal, 1:10. Seahawks 13–12. **Drive: 17 plays, 79 yards, 5:35.**

**Top passers**

- SEA – Russell Wilson – 19/30, 210 yards, TD, INT
- DAL – Matt Cassel – 13/25, 97 yards

**Top rushers**

- SEA – Marshawn Lynch – 21 rushes, 71 yards
- DAL – Darren McFadden – 20 rushes, 64 yards

**Top receivers**

- SEA – Jimmy Graham – 7 receptions, 75 yards
- DAL – Darren McFadden – 6 receptions, 49 yards

**Top tacklers**

- SEA – K. J. Wright - 6 tackles, 3 assists
- DAL – Sean Lee - 5 tackles, 6 assists

This game involved a scary moment, after Seattle's Ricardo Lockette was hit by Dallas's Jeff Heath during a kick return. He lied on the ground, motionless, for about 7 minutes before he was taken off the field on a cart. X-rays later revealed that Lockette had a broken neck, which turned out to be a career-ending injury.

The Cowboys would only kick field goals in this game, as Dan Bailey was 4 for 4 on field goals. Dallas led 12-10 with under 2 minutes to go. However, the Seahawks would march down the field and take a 13-12 lead after Steven Hauschka drilled a 24-yard field goal of his own. Dallas tried to come back, but Seattle forced a turnover on downs to end the game.

With their 5th straight loss, the Cowboys fell to 2-5.

==== Week 9: vs. Philadelphia Eagles ====
Week Nine: Philadelphia Eagles at Dallas Cowboys – Game summary

Quarter	1	2	3	4	OT	Total
**Eagles**	0	7	7	13	6	**33**
Cowboys	7	0	7	13	0	**27**

at AT&T Stadium, Arlington, Texas

- Date: November 8
- Game time: 7:30 p.m. CST
- Game weather: Played indoors (retractable roof closed)
- Game attendance: 91,827
- Referee: Ed Hochuli
- TV announcers (NBC): Al Michaels, Cris Collinsworth and Michele Tafoya
- Recap, Gamebook

Game information

**First quarter**

- DAL – Cole Beasley 5-yard pass from Matt Cassel (Dan Bailey kick), 6:50. Cowboys 7–0. **Drive: 11 plays, 93 yards, 5:46.**

**Second quarter**

- PHI – DeMarco Murray 1-yard run (Caleb Sturgis kick), 9:06. Tied 7–7. **Drive: 13 plays, 80 yards, 4:17.**

**Third quarter**

- PHI – Ryan Mathews 6-yard run (Caleb Sturgis kick), 8:38. Eagles 14–7. **Drive: 7 plays, 95 yards, 2:39.**
- DAL – Cole Beasley 17-yard pass from Matt Cassel (Dan Bailey kick), 2:11. Tied 14–14. **Drive: 10 plays, 80 yards, 6:32.**

**Fourth quarter**

- PHI – Jordan Hicks 67-yard interception return (Caleb Sturgis kick), 12:59. Eagles 21–14.
- DAL – Dez Bryant 18-yard pass from Matt Cassel (Dan Bailey kick), 11:04. Tied 21–21. **Drive: 3 plays, 24 yards, 1:55.**
- PHI – Caleb Sturgis 31-yard field goal, 7:27. Eagles 24–21. **Drive: 10 plays, 67 yards, 3:30.**
- DAL – Dan Bailey 41-yard field goal, 2:58. Tied 24–24. **Drive: 10 plays, 57 yards, 4:29.**
- PHI – Caleb Sturgis 53-yard field goal, 1:51. Eagles 27–24. **Drive: 6 plays, 45 yards, 1:07.**
- DAL – Dan Bailey 44-yard field goal, 0:07. Tied 27–27. **Drive: 9 plays, 54 yards, 1:44.**

**Overtime**

- PHI – Jordan Matthews 41-yard pass from Sam Bradford, 11:08. Eagles 33–27. **Drive: 9 plays, 80 yards, 4:01.**

**Top passers**

- PHI – Sam Bradford - 25/36, 295 yards, TD
- DAL – Matt Cassel - 25/38, 299 yards, 3 TD, INT

**Top rushers**

- PHI – DeMarco Murray - 18 rushes, 83 yards, TD
- DAL – Darren McFadden - 27 rushes, 117 yards

**Top receivers**

- PHI – Jordan Matthews - 9 receptions, 133 yards, TD
- DAL – Cole Beasley - 9 receptions, 112 yards, 2 TD

**Top tacklers**

- PHI – Malcolm Jenkins - 8 tackles, 1 assist
- DAL – Barry Church - 4 tackles, 4 assists

The Cowboys would rally to tie the game after Dan Bailey converted a 44 yard field goal that caromed off the uprights with 2 seconds left. The Eagles would get the ball first, and would move down the field. During the drive, the Eagles faced a 4th and 1, and decided to go for it. Ryan Mathews would get the ball, but he would fumble on the play, and the Cowboys appeared to recover. However, the play was reviewed, and review showed that Mathews's knee was down prior to the ball coming out. The Eagles got another chance. On the next play, Sam Bradford found Jordan Matthews on a 41-yard touchdown reception to end the game.

With the loss, the Cowboys fell to 2-6.

==== Week 10: at Tampa Bay Buccaneers ====
Week Ten: Dallas Cowboys at Tampa Bay Buccaneers – Game summary

Quarter	1	2	3	4	Total
Cowboys	3	3	0	0	**6**
**Buccaneers**	0	3	0	7	**10**

at Raymond James Stadium, Tampa, Florida

- Date: November 15
- Game time: 1:00 p.m. EST/12:00 p.m. CST
- Game weather: 79 °F (26 °C), cloudy
- Game attendance: 64,133
- Referee: Bill Vinovich
- TV announcers (Fox): Kevin Burkhardt, John Lynch and Pam Oliver
- Recap, Gamebook

Game information

**First quarter**

- DAL – Dan Bailey 42-yard field goal, 4:00. Cowboys 3–0. **Drive: 12 plays, 28 yards, 6:20.**

**Second quarter**

- TB – Connor Barth 52-yard field goal, 14:56. Tied 3–3. **Drive: 9 plays, 46 yards, 4:04.**
- DAL – Dan Bailey 53-yard field goal, 10:41. Cowboys 6–3. **Drive: 7 plays, 34 yards, 4:17.**

**Third quarter**

- No scoring plays.

**Fourth quarter**

- TB – Jameis Winston 1-yard run (Connor Barth kick), 0:59. Buccaneers 10–6. **Drive: 10 plays, 56 yards, 3:06.**

**Top passers**

- DAL – Matt Cassel – 19/29, 186 yards, INT
- TB – Jameis Winston – 22/39, 264 yards, 2 INT

**Top rushers**

- DAL – Darren McFadden – 17 rushes, 32 yards
- TB – Doug Martin – 18 rushes, 63 yards

**Top receivers**

- DAL – Dez Bryant – 5 receptions, 45 yards
- TB – Mike Evans – 8 receptions, 126 yards

**Top tacklers**

- DAL – Barry Church - 9 tackles, 2 assists
- TB – Lavonte David - 5 tackles, 7 assists (1 sack)

The Cowboys would manage only 2 field goals during this game, as they lost to Tampa Bay 10-6. Jameis Winston would run the ball in from a yard out to give the Buccaneers the lead for good with 54 seconds left. The Cowboys tried to rally, but quarterback Matt Cassel's deep pass into Buccaneers territory would end up getting intercepted, sealing the Cowboys' seventh straight defeat.

With the loss, the Cowboys fell to 2-7. They became the first team since the 2013 Texans to lose seven consecutive games after a 2-0 start.

==== Week 11: at Miami Dolphins ====
Week Eleven: Dallas Cowboys at Miami Dolphins – Game summary

Quarter	1	2	3	4	Total
**Cowboys**	0	14	0	10	**24**
Dolphins	0	7	7	0	**14**

at Sun Life Stadium, Miami Gardens, Florida

- Date: November 22
- Game time: 1:00 p.m. EST/12:00 p.m. CST
- Game weather: 74 °F (23 °C), mostly cloudy
- Game attendance: 65,115
- Referee: Jeff Triplette
- TV announcers (Fox): Kevin Burkhardt, John Lynch and Peter Schrager
- Recap, Gamebook

Game information

**First quarter**

- No scoring plays.

**Second quarter**

- DAL – Rolando McClain 12-yard interception return (Dan Bailey kick), 15:00. Cowboys 7–0.
- DAL – Terrance Williams 31-yard pass from Tony Romo (Dan Bailey kick), 1:23. Cowboys 14–0. **Drive: 12 plays, 93 yards, 8:30.**
- MIA – Jordan Cameron 12-yard pass from Ryan Tannehill (Andrew Franks kick), 0:23. Cowboys 14–7. **Drive: 3 plays, 54 yards, 0:52.**

**Third quarter**

- MIA – Kenny Stills 29-yard pass from Ryan Tannehill (Andrew Franks kick), 5:26. Tied 14–14. **Drive: 5 plays, 58 yards, 1:53.**

**Fourth quarter**

- DAL – Dez Bryant 16-yard pass from Tony Romo (Dan Bailey kick), 15:00. Cowboys 21–14. **Drive: 8 plays, 80 yards, 5:25.**
- DAL – Dan Bailey 30-yard field goal, 9:23. Cowboys 24–14. **Drive: 7 plays, 10 yards, 4:49.**

**Top passers**

- DAL – Tony Romo – 18/28, 227 yards, 2 TD, 2 INT
- MIA – Ryan Tannehill – 13/24, 188 yards, 2 TD, INT

**Top rushers**

- DAL – Darren McFadden – 29 rushes, 129 yards
- MIA – Lamar Miller – 7 rushes, 44 yards

**Top receivers**

- DAL – Terrance Williams – 4 receptions, 79 yards, TD
- MIA – Jarvis Landry – 4 receptions, 66 yards

**Top tacklers**

- DAL – Sean Lee - 4 tackles
- MIA – Kelvin Sheppard - 10 tackles, 4 assists

Dallas would finally break their 7 game losing streak with a 24-14 win over the Dolphins. Tony Romo returned to action after missing 7 weeks with a collarbone injury. He would have a fine return, as he would throw 2 touchdown passes along with 2 interceptions in the win. He would also throw for 227 yards during the game.

With the win, the Cowboys improved to 3-7.

==== Week 12: vs. Carolina Panthers ====
Thanksgiving Day game

Week Twelve: Carolina Panthers at Dallas Cowboys – Game summary

Quarter	1	2	3	4	Total
**Panthers**	10	13	7	3	**33**
Cowboys	3	0	3	8	**14**

at AT&T Stadium, Arlington, Texas

- Date: November 26
- Game time: 3:30 p.m. CST
- Game weather: Played indoors (retractable roof closed)
- Game attendance: 90,909
- Referee: Ron Torbert
- TV announcers (CBS): Jim Nantz, Phil Simms and Tracy Wolfson
- Recap, Gamebook

Game information

**First quarter**

- CAR – Kurt Coleman 36-yard interception return (Graham Gano kick), 14:15. Panthers 7–0.
- CAR – Graham Gano 49-yard field goal, 8:14. Panthers 10–0. **Drive: 9 plays, 47 yards, 4:18.**
- DAL – Dan Bailey 21-yard field goal, 1:25. Panthers 10–3. **Drive: 13 plays, 77 yards, 6:47.**

**Second quarter**

- CAR – Graham Gano 43-yard field goal, 3:32. Panthers 13–3. **Drive: 10 plays, 48 yards, 5:48.**
- CAR – Luke Kuechly 32-yard interception return (Graham Gano kick), 2:47. Panthers 20–3.
- CAR – Graham Gano 25-yard field goal, 0:03. Panthers 23–3. **Drive: 9 plays, 22 yards, 2:23.**

**Third quarter**

- DAL – Dan Bailey 48-yard field goal, 7:53. Panthers 23–6. **Drive: 6 plays, 22 yards, 3:35.**
- CAR – Cam Newton 4-yard run (Graham Gano kick), 0:25. Panthers 30–6. **Drive: 14 plays, 80 yards, 7:29.**

**Fourth quarter**

- CAR – Graham Gano 50-yard field goal, 10:27. Panthers 33–6. **Drive: 6 plays, 26 yards, 3:50.**
- DAL – Cole Beasley 2-yard pass from Matt Cassel (Matt Cassel-Darren McFadden pass), 4:27. Panthers 33–14. **Drive: 16 plays, 80 yards, 6:00.**

**Top passers**

- CAR – Cam Newton – 16/27, 183 yards
- DAL – Tony Romo – 11/21, 106 yards, 3 INT

**Top rushers**

- CAR – Jonathan Stewart – 21 rushes, 68 yards
- DAL – Robert Turbin – 2 rushes, 11 yards

**Top receivers**

- CAR – Jerricho Cotchery – 5 receptions, 73 yards
- DAL – Darren McFadden – 4 receptions, 45 yards

**Top tacklers**

- CAR – Luke Kuechly – 2 tackles, 5 assists, 2 INT, 1 defensive TD
- DAL – Rolando McClain – 7 tackles, 5 assists

Tony Romo would play at quarterback for the second straight week. However, he would get injured again, as he would suffer a clavicle injury at the end of the 3rd quarter while being sacked by Thomas Davis. Romo would throw 3 interceptions and no touchdowns as the Cowboys were rattled at home to the undefeated Panthers, 33-14.

It was later revealed that Romo would miss the rest of the season with a broken clavicle. This would be Romo's last NFL game until Week 17 of the 2016 NFL Season, as he would lose his starting job to 2016 rookie Dak Prescott after a pre-season back injury that would sideline him for the first 10 weeks of the season.

With the crushing loss, the Cowboys fell to 3-8.

==== Week 13: at Washington Redskins ====
Week Thirteen: Dallas Cowboys at Washington Redskins – Game summary

Quarter	1	2	3	4	Total
**Cowboys**	0	3	3	13	**19**
Redskins	0	3	3	10	**16**

at FedExField, Landover, Maryland

- Date: December 7
- Game time: 8:30 p.m. EST/7:30 p.m. CST
- Game weather: 41 °F (5 °C), clear
- Game attendance: 80,444
- Referee: Walt Anderson
- TV announcers (ESPN): Mike Tirico, Jon Gruden and Lisa Salters
- Recap, Gamebook

Game information

**First quarter**

- No scoring plays

**Second quarter**

- DAL – Dan Bailey 38-yard field goal, 6:36. Cowboys 3–0. **Drive: 10 plays, 60 yards, 5:16.**
- WAS – Dustin Hopkins 45-yard field goal, 0:02. Tied 3–3. **Drive: 14 plays, 58 yards, 6:31.**

**Third quarter**

- WAS – Dustin Hopkins 36-yard field goal, 10:37. Redskins 6–3. **Drive: 6 plays, 23 yards, 3:07.**
- DAL – Dan Bailey 34-yard field goal, 3:39. Tied 6–6. **Drive: 11 plays, 64 yards, 6:59.**

**Fourth quarter**

- WAS – Dustin Hopkins 46-yard field goal, 14:19. Redskins 9–6. **Drive: 8 plays, 50 yards, 4:19.**
- DAL – Dan Bailey 20-yard field goal, 4:25. Tied 9–9. **Drive: 6 plays, 65 yards, 3:04.**
- DAL – Darren McFadden 6-yard run (Dan Bailey kick), 1:19. Cowboys 16–9. **Drive: 2 plays, 15 yards, 0:12.**
- WAS – DeSean Jackson 28-yard pass from Kirk Cousins (Dustin Hopkins kick), 0:49. Tied 16–16. **Drive: 4 plays, 43 yards, 0:30.**
- DAL – Dan Bailey 54-yard field goal, 0:14. Cowboys 19–16. **Drive: 5 plays, 20 yards, 0:35.**

**Top passers**

- DAL – Matt Cassel – 16/29, 223 yards
- WAS – Kirk Cousins – 22/31, 219 yards, TD

**Top rushers**

- DAL – Darren McFadden – 14 rushes, 53 yards, TD
- WAS – Matt Jones – 18 rushes, 49 yards

**Top receivers**

- DAL – Terrance Williams – 2 receptions, 63 yards
- WAS – DeSean Jackson – 6 receptions, 80 yards, TD

**Top tacklers**

- DAL – Sean Lee – 6 tackles, 7 assists (1 sack)
- WAS – Mason Foster – 4 tackles, 3 assists, 1 forced fumble, 1 fumble recovery

The Cowboys would get an upset win over the Washington Redskins on Monday Night Football. The game was mostly contested with field goals, until the end of the 4th quarter. DeSean Jackson would fumble a punt return with 1:31 remaining on the clock, which was recovered by Dallas. The Cowboys would take the lead after Darren McFadden took it in from 6 yards out to give them a 16-9 lead. On the ensuing kickoff, Washington got a good return from Rashad Ross that put the Redskins in Dallas territory. Washington would score soon afterwards, with DeSean Jackson catching a 28-yard touchdown pass from Kirk Cousins to tie the game at 16. However, the Cowboys would march down the field in response and Dan Bailey would end the game by kicking a 54 yard field goal with 9 seconds left.

With the win, the Cowboys improved to 4-8 and remained in the playoff hunt, aided by the fact that all four NFC East teams had losing records.

==== Week 14: at Green Bay Packers ====
Week Fourteen: Dallas Cowboys at Green Bay Packers – Game summary

Quarter	1	2	3	4	Total
Cowboys	0	0	7	0	**7**
**Packers**	0	14	0	14	**28**

at Lambeau Field, Green Bay, Wisconsin

- Date: December 13
- Game time: 3:25 p.m. CST
- Game weather: 53 °F (12 °C), rain
- Game attendance: 78,369
- Referee: Brad Allen
- TV announcers (Fox): Joe Buck, Troy Aikman and Erin Andrews
- Recap, Gamebook

Game information

**First quarter**

- No scoring plays

**Second quarter**

- GB – James Starks 13-yard pass from Aaron Rodgers (Mason Crosby kick), 9:55. Packers 7–0. **Drive: 9 plays, 48 yards, 4:14.**
- GB – Richard Rodgers 3-yard pass from Aaron Rodgers (Mason Crosby kick), 2:45. Packers 14–0. **Drive: 11 plays, 81 yards, 4:14.**

**Third quarter**

- DAL – Robert Turbin 7-yard run (Dan Bailey kick), 8:28. Packers 14–7. **Drive: 4 plays, 80 yards, 2:07.**

**Fourth quarter**

- GB – James Starks 30-yard run (Mason Crosby kick), 4:50. Packers 21–7. **Drive: 12 plays, 84 yards, 6:34.**
- GB – Eddie Lacy 1-yard run (Mason Crosby kick), 2:50. Packers 28–7. **Drive: 4 plays, 38 yards, 0:25.**

**Top passers**

- DAL – Matt Cassel – 13/29, 114 yards, INT
- GB – Aaron Rodgers – 22/35, 218 yards, 2 TD

**Top rushers**

- DAL – Darren McFadden – 9 rushes, 111 yards
- GB – Eddie Lacy – 24 rushes, 124 yards, TD

**Top receivers**

- DAL – Jason Witten – 5 receptions, 40 yards
- GB – Randall Cobb – 8 receptions, 81 yards

**Top tacklers**

- DAL – Barry Church – 9 tackles, 2 assists
- GB – Clay Matthews III – 5 tackles, 1 assist (1 sack)

The Cowboys traveled to Lambeau Field to take on the Packers in a rematch of last season's Divisional Round, in which Green Bay narrowly won after Dez Bryant's controversial catch was overturned, allowing the Packers to advance to the NFC Championship game.

This time, with no Tony Romo leading the Cowboys, Green Bay won handily by 28-7, which dropped the Cowboys' record to 4-9.

==== Week 15: vs. New York Jets ====
Week Fifteen: New York Jets at Dallas Cowboys – Game summary

Quarter	1	2	3	4	Total
**Jets**	6	3	0	10	**19**
Cowboys	3	7	3	3	**16**

at AT&T Stadium, Arlington, Texas

- Date: December 19
- Game time: 7:25 p.m. CST
- Game weather: Played indoors (retractable roof closed)
- Game attendance: 90,345
- Referee: Craig Wrolstad
- TV announcers (NFLN): Jim Nantz, Phil Simms and Tracy Wolfson
- Recap, Gamebook

Game information

**First quarter**

- DAL – Dan Bailey 27-yard field goal, 10:50. Cowboys 3–0. **Drive: 9 plays, 70 yards, 4:11.**
- NYJ – Bilal Powell 12-yard run (kick failed), 0:35. Jets 6–3. **Drive: 7 plays, 60 yards, 1:48.**

**Second quarter**

- NYJ – Randy Bullock 36-yard field goal, 7:06. Jets 9–3. **Drive: 4 plays, 6 yards, 2:44.**
- DAL – Dez Bryant 10-yard pass from Kellen Moore (Dan Bailey kick), 1:25. Cowboys 10–9. **Drive: 4 plays, 55 yards, 0:30.**

**Third quarter**

- DAL – Dan Bailey 38-yard field goal, 3:49. Cowboys 13–9. **Drive: 4 plays, 2 yards, 0:42.**

**Fourth quarter**

- NYJ – Eric Decker 3-yard pass from Ryan Fitzpatrick (Randy Bullock kick), 9:01. Jets 16–13. **Drive: 9 plays, 70 yards, 5:07.**
- DAL – Dan Bailey 50-yard field goal, 2:00. Tied 16–16. **Drive: 11 plays, 51 yards, 7:03.**
- NYJ – Randy Bullock 40-yard field goal, 0:41. Jets 19–16. **Drive: 8 plays, 58 yards, 1:19.**

**Top passers**

- NYJ – Ryan Fitzpatrick – 26/39, 299 yards, TD, INT
- DAL – Kellen Moore – 15/25, 158 yards, TD, 3 INT

**Top rushers**

- NYJ – Chris Ivory – 13 rushes, 37 yards
- DAL – Darren McFadden – 16 rushes, 100 yards

**Top receivers**

- NYJ – Brandon Marshall – 4 receptions, 74 yards
- DAL – Dez Bryant – 4 receptions, 50 yards, TD

**Top tacklers**

- NYJ – Damon Harrison – 4 tackles, 4 assists
- DAL – Anthony Hitchens – 5 tackles, 5 assists

The Cowboys came into this game needing a win to remain in the playoff hunt. However, they had to go through a hot Jets team for it. Towards the end of the game, Jets quarterback Ryan Fitzpatrick would sneak the ball across for a first down deep in his own territory. However, the replay showed that the ball might have come out as he was sneaking over the line. The play was reviewed, but the call stood, and the Jets kept the ball. The Jets would eventually march down the field. Randy Bullock would give the Jets a 19-16 lead with 36 seconds left. The Cowboys would try to go down the field with Kellen Moore at the quarterback spot. However, one of his passes would be intercepted by Darrelle Revis, ending the game.

With the loss, Dallas fell to 4-10 and was mathematically eliminated from playoff contention.

==== Week 16: at Buffalo Bills ====
Week Sixteen: Dallas Cowboys at Buffalo Bills – Game summary

Quarter	1	2	3	4	Total
Cowboys	3	3	0	0	**6**
**Bills**	6	0	3	7	**16**

at Ralph Wilson Stadium, Orchard Park, New York

- Date: December 27
- Game time: 1:00 p.m. EST/12:00 p.m. CST
- Game weather: 39 °F (4 °C), rain showers
- Game attendance: 70,172
- Referee: Jeff Triplette
- TV announcers (Fox): Kenny Albert, Daryl Johnston and Laura Okmin
- Recap, Gamebook

Game information

**First quarter**

- DAL – Dan Bailey 46-yard field goal, 9:45. Cowboys 3–0. **Drive: 11 plays, 52 yards, 5:19.**
- BUF – Karlos Williams 1-yard run (kick failed), 0:51. Bills 6–3. **Drive: 5 plays, 60 yards, 1:57.**

**Second quarter**

- DAL – Dan Bailey 22-yard field goal, 5:29. Tied 6–6. **Drive: 6 plays, 40 yards, 2:51.**

**Third quarter**

- BUF – Dan Carpenter 32-yard field goal, 6:21. Bills 9–6. **Drive: 10 plays, 56 yards, 5:37.**

**Fourth quarter**

- BUF – Mike Gillislee 50-yard run (Dan Carpenter kick), 2:34. Bills 16–6. **Drive: 9 plays, 92 yards, 4:28.**

**Top passers**

- DAL – Kellen Moore – 13/31, 186 yards, INT
- BUF – Tyrod Taylor – 13/18, 179 yards, INT

**Top rushers**

- DAL – Darren McFadden – 19 rushes, 99 yards
- BUF – Mike Gillislee – 9 rushes, 93 yards, TD

**Top receivers**

- DAL – Brice Butler – 4 receptions, 74 yards
- BUF – Sammy Watkins – 5 receptions, 84 yards

**Top tacklers**

- DAL – Sean Lee – 11 tackles, 4 assists (0.5 sacks)
- BUF – Corey Graham – 8 tackles, 3 assists

The Cowboys managed only 2 field goals from Dan Bailey, as they lost 6-16 to Buffalo. Kellen Moore would start for the Cowboys again, as Matt Cassel was benched.

With the loss, the Cowboys fell to 4-11 and secured a fourth place finish in the NFC East for the first time since 2002.

==== Week 17: vs. Washington Redskins ====
Week Seventeen: Washington Redskins at Dallas Cowboys – Game summary

Quarter	1	2	3	4	Total
**Redskins**	21	3	3	7	**34**
Cowboys	0	14	0	9	**23**

at AT&T Stadium, Arlington, Texas

- Date: January 3, 2016
- Game time: 12:00 p.m. CST
- Game weather: Played indoors (retractable roof closed)
- Game attendance: 90,127
- Referee: John Parry
- TV announcers (Fox): Chris Myers, Ronde Barber and Holly Sonders
- Recap, Gamebook

Game information

**First quarter**

- WAS – Ryan Grant 5-yard pass from Kirk Cousins (Dustin Hopkins kick), 9:14. Redskins 7–0. **Drive: 2 plays, 49 yards, 0:44.**
- WAS – Pierre Garcon 39-yard pass from Kirk Cousins (Dustin Hopkins kick), 4:28. Redskins 14–0. **Drive: 3 plays, 43 yards, 1:32.**
- WAS – Jamison Crowder 3-yard pass from Kirk Cousins (Dustin Hopkins kick), 0:24. Redskins 21–0. **Drive: 8 plays, 30 yards, 3:22.**

**Second quarter**

- WAS – Dustin Hopkins 27-yard field goal, 8:20. Redskins 24–0. **Drive: 8 plays, 68 yards, 4:18.**
- DAL – Jason Witten 4-yard pass from Kellen Moore (Dan Bailey kick), 3:39. Redskins 24–7. **Drive: 9 plays, 80 yards, 4:41.**
- DAL – Cole Beasley 5-yard pass from Kellen Moore (Dan Bailey kick), 0:26. Redskins 24–14. **Drive: 7 plays, 86 yards, 1:11.**

**Third quarter**

- WAS – Dustin Hopkins 33-yard field goal, 3:01. Redskins 27–14. **Drive: 14 plays, 74 yards, 8:21.**

**Fourth quarter**

- WAS – Rashad Ross 71-yard pass from Colt McCoy (Dustin Hopkins kick), 15:00. Redskins 34–14. **Drive: 3 plays, 72 yards, 1:32.**
- DAL – Alfred Morris tackled in the end zone by J. J. Wilcox and DeMarcus Lawrence for a safety, 12:27. Redskins 34–16.
- DAL – Cole Beasley 7-yard pass from Kellen Moore (Dan Bailey kick), 4:22. Redskins 34–23. **Drive: 12 plays, 89 yards, 3:32.**

**Top passers**

- WAS – Kirk Cousins – 12/15, 176 yards, 3 TD
- DAL – Kellen Moore – 33/48, 435 yards, 3 TD, 2 INT

**Top rushers**

- WAS – Alfred Morris – 19 rushes, 100 yards
- DAL – Darren McFadden – 12 rushes, 92 yards

**Top receivers**

- WAS – Jamison Crowder – 5 receptions, 109 yards, TD
- DAL – Terrance Williams – 8 receptions, 173 yards

**Top tacklers**

- WAS – Will Blackmon – 7 tackles, INT, 1 forced fumble
- DAL – Rolando McClain – 6 tackles, 6 assists

The Cowboys would trail 0-24 by the second quarter, and despite an attempt to come back, they would go on to lose 23-34 to the NFC East Champions Redskins.

With the loss, the Cowboys ended their season with a frustrating record of 4-12. They also finished 1-7 at home, their worst home record since 1989.

== Standings ==
=== Division ===
NFC East
	W	L	T	PCT	DIV	CONF	PF	PA	STK
^{(4)} Washington Redskins	9	7	0	.563	4–2	8–4	388	379	W4
Philadelphia Eagles	7	9	0	.438	3–3	4–8	377	430	W1
New York Giants	6	10	0	.375	2–4	4–8	420	442	L3
Dallas Cowboys	4	12	0	.250	3–3	3–9	275	374	L4

=== Conference ===
NFC
#	Team	Division	W	L	T	PCT	DIV	CONF	SOS	SOV	STK
Division Leaders
1	Carolina Panthers	South	15	1	0	.938	5–1	11–1	.441	.438	W1
2	Arizona Cardinals	West	13	3	0	.813	4–2	10–2	.477	.457	L1
3	Minnesota Vikings	North	11	5	0	.688	5–1	8–4	.504	.449	W3
4	Washington Redskins	East	9	7	0	.563	4–2	8–4	.465	.403	W4
Wild Cards
5 (Note: Green Bay finished ahead of Seattle based on head-to-head victory.)	Green Bay Packers	North	10	6	0	.625	3–3	7–5	.531	.450	L2
6	Seattle Seahawks	West	10	6	0	.625	3–3	7–5	.520	.431	W1
Did not qualify for the postseason
7	Atlanta Falcons	South	8	8	0	.500	1–5	5–7	.480	.453	L1
8 (Note: St. Louis and Detroit finished ahead of Philadelphia and New Orleans based on conference record. St. Louis finished ahead of Detroit based on head-to-head victory. Detroit finished ahead of Philadelphia and New Orleans based on head-to-head sweep, while Philadelphia finished ahead of New Orleans based on head-to-head victory.)	St. Louis Rams	West	7	9	0	.438	4–2	6–6	.527	.482	L1
9	Detroit Lions	North	7	9	0	.438	3–3	6–6	.535	.429	W3
10	Philadelphia Eagles	East	7	9	0	.438	3–3	4–8	.508	.473	W1
11	New Orleans Saints	South	7	9	0	.438	3–3	5–7	.504	.402	W2
12 (Note: The New York Giants and Chicago each finished ahead of Tampa Bay based on head-to-head victory, while the Giants finished ahead of Chicago based on conference record.)	New York Giants	East	6	10	0	.375	2–4	4–8	.500	.396	L3
13	Chicago Bears	North	6	10	0	.375	1–5	3–9	.547	.469	L1
14	Tampa Bay Buccaneers	South	6	10	0	.375	3–3	5–7	.484	.406	L4
15	San Francisco 49ers	West	5	11	0	.313	1–5	4–8	.539	.463	W1
16	Dallas Cowboys	East	4	12	0	.250	3–3	3–9	.531	.438	L4
Tiebreakers (Note: When breaking ties for three or more teams under the NFL's rules, they are first broken within divisions, then comparing only the highest-ranked remaining team from each division.)
