= Chaz Green =

American football player (born 1992)

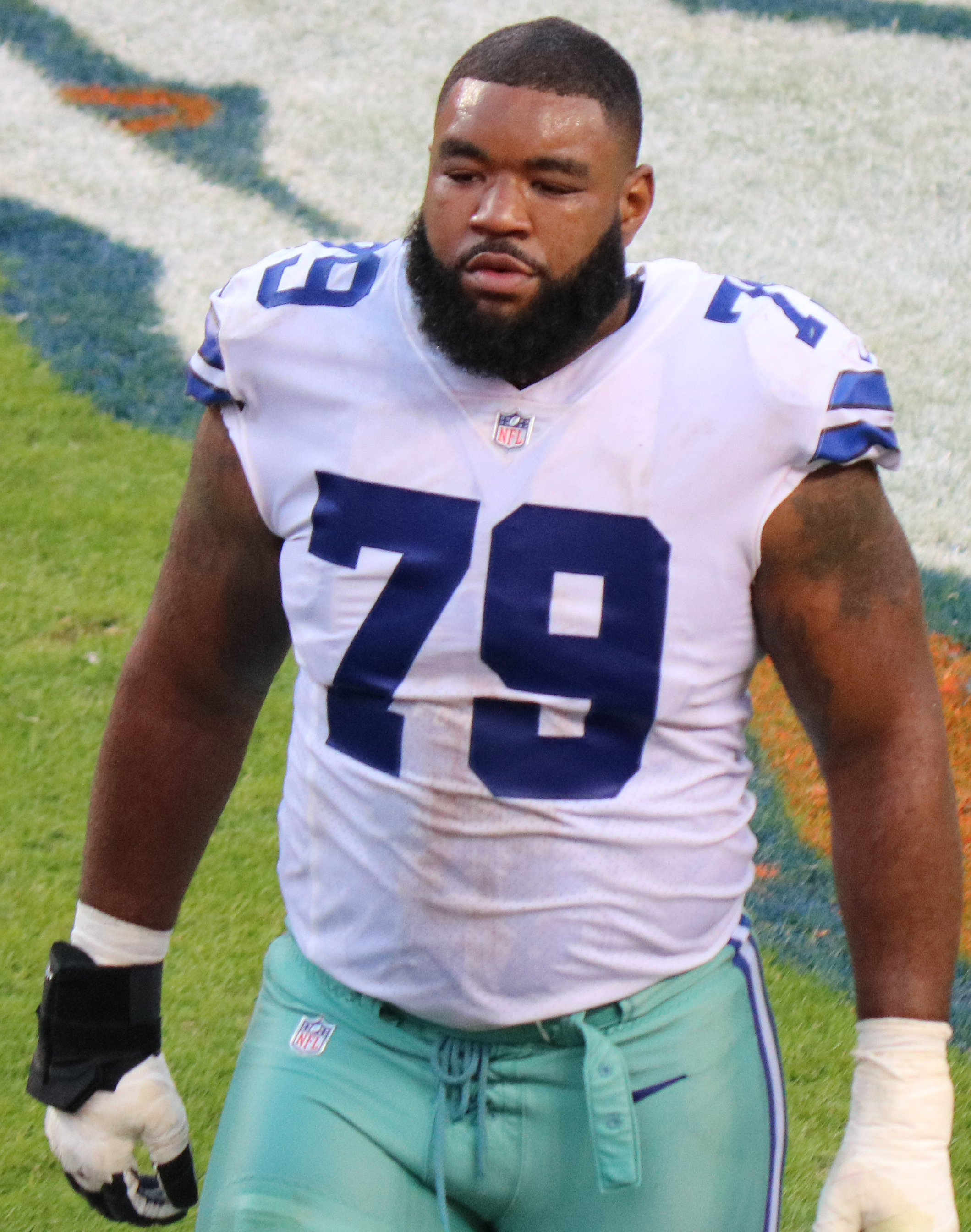
- Green with the Dallas Cowboys in 2017

No. 79, 65, 75, 74
- Position: Offensive tackle

Personal information
- Born: April 8, 1992 (age 34); Tampa, Florida, U.S.
- Listed height: 6 ft 5 in (1.96 m)
- Listed weight: 318 lb (144 kg)

Career information
- High school: Tampa Catholic (Tampa)
- College: Florida (2010–2014)
- NFL draft: 2015: 3rd round, 91st overall pick

Career history
- Dallas Cowboys (2015–2017); New Orleans Saints (2018); Oakland Raiders (2018); Denver Broncos (2019)*; Indianapolis Colts (2020); Pittsburgh Steelers (2021)
- * Offseason or practice squad member only

Awards and highlights
- SEC All-Freshman team (2011)

Career NFL statistics
- Games played: 39
- Games started: 8
- Stats at Pro Football Reference

Chaz Green (born April 8, 1992) is an American former professional football player who was an offensive tackle in the National Football League (NFL). He was selected by the Dallas Cowboys in the third round of the 2015 NFL draft. He played college football for the Florida Gators. He was also a member of the New Orleans Saints, Oakland Raiders, Denver Broncos, Indianapolis Colts and Pittsburgh Steelers.

== Early life ==
Green attended Tampa Catholic High School, where he was a starter at left tackle. As a junior, he was named second-team FSWA 2A all-state. As a senior, he helped his team earn a Florida 2B Runner-Up finish with an 11–2 record and rush for over 3,000 yards. He was rated the No. 6 offensive lineman in the nation.

== College career ==
Green committed to the University of Florida over Ohio State, Georgia, Tennessee and USC as a 4-star recruit. He redshirted the 2010 season, after dressing for 12 games but not recording a play.

In 2011, he started the first 8 games at right tackle before injuring his ankle and missing 4 games. Green earned Freshman All-American honors.

As a sophomore, he recorded 10 starts, but missed two games due to injury. He missed the entire 2013 season after suffering a torn labrum prior to the opener. The next year, he started 11 games, playing both right (9 games) and left tackle (2 games) positions.

== Professional career ==
Pre-draft measurables
Height	Weight	Arm length	Hand span	40-yard dash	10-yard split	20-yard split	20-yard shuttle	Three-cone drill	Vertical jump	Broad jump	Bench press
6 ft 4 5/8 in (1.95 m)	314 lb (142 kg)	33 3/8 in (0.85 m)	10 7/8 in (0.28 m)	5.16 s	1.78 s	2.97 s	4.70 s	8.00 s	29.5 in (0.75 m)	8 ft 10 in (2.69 m)	21 reps
All values from NFL Combine

=== Dallas Cowboys ===
Green was selected by the Dallas Cowboys in the third round (91st overall) of the 2015 NFL draft, after dropping because of durability issues. After injuring his hip during organized team activities, he had surgery on June 16, which caused him to miss all of training camp and start the season on the physically unable to perform list. Although he was activated on December 3 from the physically unable to perform list, he was declared inactive in the last 5 games of the season.

In 2016, he was the backup swing tackle on what was considered the best offensive line in the NFL. He started at left tackle against the Chicago Bears and the San Francisco 49ers in place of an injured Tyron Smith. He suffered a sprained foot against the 49ers that held him out several weeks, before developing a herniated disk. He underwent surgery and was placed on the injured reserve list on December 16, finishing with a total of 12 missed games.

In 2017, Green was seen as the potential starter at right tackle after Doug Free retired, but because he wasn't available during OTAs while recovering from his previous back injury, it opened the door for La'el Collins to move from offensive guard to tackle and earn the starter position. Green was then given the starting left guard role, to replace Ronald Leary who left in free agency. On July 31 a week into training camp, he suffered a strained rotator cuff in practice, forcing him to miss 15 days. He started the first three contests of the season at left guard, until missing the Friday practice before the Los Angeles Rams game with a hip bursitis, giving Jonathan Cooper a chance to secure the starting position. Green returned to the backup swing tackle role for the next contests. In Week 8 against the Kansas City Chiefs, he played the final six snaps at left tackle in place of an injured Tyron Smith. He was named the starter at left tackle the next game against the Atlanta Falcons, but allowed four sacks to defensive end Adrian Clayborn and was replaced in favor of Byron Bell, who ended up giving one more sack. Even though the Cowboys coaches were criticized for not adjusting the game plan to stop Clayborn, Green never recovered from the debacle and did not play another snap for the rest of the season.

In 2018, with the signing of offensive tackle Cameron Fleming in free agency, Green was asked to concentrate on playing right tackle, but struggled in preseason games as the backup to Collins. As in previous seasons, he also had to fight through bouts of dehydration during training camp, that forced him to leave practices early on different occasions with cramping. He was released by the Cowboys on September 1, 2018.

=== New Orleans Saints ===
On October 24, 2018, Green was signed by the New Orleans Saints. He was released on November 21, 2018.

=== Oakland Raiders ===
On November 27, 2018, Green was signed by the Oakland Raiders. He started in Week 15 for the Raiders game against the Bengals.

On March 15, 2019, Green re-signed with the Raiders. On May 28, 2019, the Raiders cut Green.

=== Denver Broncos ===
On June 3, 2019, Green was signed by the Denver Broncos. He was released on August 31, 2019.

=== Indianapolis Colts ===
On December 30, 2019, Green signed a reserve/future contract with the Indianapolis Colts. On September 6, 2020, he was released, but was re-signed to the active roster later that same day. He appeared in 15 games (one start), missing one contest with a back injury.

=== Pittsburgh Steelers ===
On July 20, 2021, the Pittsburgh Steelers signed Green to a one-year contract. He was waived on August 31, 2021 and re-signed to the practice squad the next day. On September 27, Green was promoted to the active roster. He signed a reserve/future contract with the Steelers on January 21, 2022.

On August 30, 2022, Green was waived by the Steelers.
