= Jack Crawford (American football) =

English American football player (born 1988)

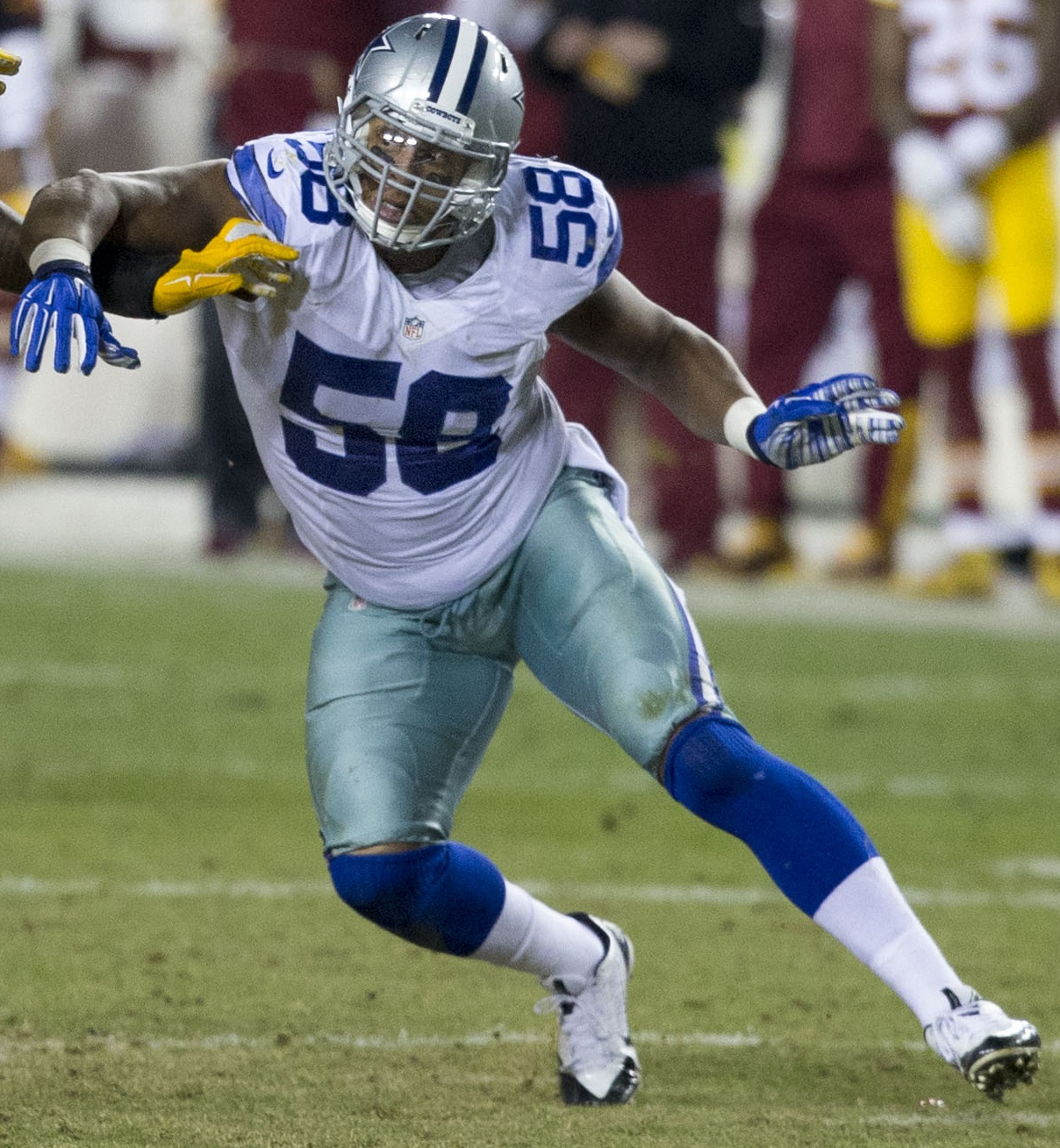
- Crawford with the Dallas Cowboys in 2015

No. 91, 58, 95, 94
- Position: Defensive end

Personal information
- Born: 7 September 1988 (age 38); London, England
- Listed height: 6 ft 5 in (1.96 m)
- Listed weight: 274 lb (124 kg)

Career information
- High school: St. Augustine (Richland, New Jersey, U.S.)
- College: Penn State (2008–2011)
- NFL draft: 2012: 5th round, 158th overall pick

Career history
- Oakland Raiders (2012–2013); Dallas Cowboys (2014–2016); Atlanta Falcons (2017–2019); Tennessee Titans (2020); Arizona Cardinals (2021)

Awards and highlights
- Second-team All-Big Ten (2011)

Career NFL statistics
- Total tackles: 165
- Sacks: 18.0
- Forced fumbles: 3
- Interceptions: 1
- Stats at Pro Football Reference

Jack Justin Crawford (born 7 September 1988) is an English former professional American football defensive end. He played college football for the Penn State Nittany Lions and was selected by the Oakland Raiders in the fifth round of the 2012 NFL draft. Crawford was also a member of the Dallas Cowboys, Atlanta Falcons, Tennessee Titans, and Arizona Cardinals.

== Early life ==
Growing up in Kilburn, London, Crawford attended high school at the City of London School, where he was in the same class as Harry Potter actor Daniel Radcliffe. At age seven, Crawford was diagnosed with alopecia universalis, a rare, autoimmune disease causing the total loss of all hair on the body.

After moving to the United States in 2005, Crawford attended St. Augustine Preparatory School while he resided in Longport, New Jersey. Although he intended to pursue basketball, Crawford could not play as a sophomore because of an international transfer rule and decided to join the American football team with no previous experience.

As a senior, Crawford found success at defensive end and tight end, being rated as the fifteenth defensive end in the nation (Scout.com), while registering 12 touchdown catches. He received All-area and All-Parochial honors. Crawford also practiced basketball and soccer.

== College career ==
Crawford accepted a football scholarship from Pennsylvania State University. As a true freshman, he appeared in all games, playing both defensive tackle and tight end, while recording four tackles and two passes defensed.

As a sophomore, Crawford replaced Aaron Maybin and started all 13 games at defensive end, ranking ninth in the Big Ten Conference in tackles for loss (15) and tenth in sacks (5.5). He also made 31 tackles, two fumble recoveries (tied for the team lead), three pass breakups and one forced fumble.

As a junior, Crawford appeared in 10 games with seven starts. In the fifth game against the University of Iowa, he suffered ligament damage in his right foot and missed the next three contests. Crawford compiled 14 tackles (4.5 for loss) and two sacks.

As a senior, Crawford started all 13 games, posting 42 tackles (7.5 for loss), 6.5 sacks, six passes defensed, and two fumble recoveries.

== Professional career ==
Pre-draft measurables
Height	Weight	Arm length	Hand span	40-yard dash	10-yard split	20-yard split	20-yard shuttle	Three-cone drill	Vertical jump	Broad jump	Bench press
6 ft 4 7/8 in (1.95 m)	274 lb (124 kg)	33 1/2 in (0.85 m)	10 1/4 in (0.26 m)	4.85 s	1.65 s	2.85 s	4.25 s	7.15 s	33.0 in (0.84 m)	9 ft 8 in (2.95 m)	14 reps
All values from NFL Combine/Pro Day

=== Oakland Raiders ===
Crawford was selected by the Oakland Raiders in the fifth round (158th overall) of the 2012 NFL draft. As a rookie, he was a backup player, appearing in four games and registering five tackles. Crawford was declared inactive in 12 contests.

In 2013, Crawford played all along the defensive line, appearing in 15 games, while recording 12 tackles (one for loss) and two quarterback pressures.

Crawford was waived on 30 August 2014.

=== Dallas Cowboys ===
On 2 September 2014, Crawford was signed as a free agent by the Dallas Cowboys, who had scouted him during joint training camp practices with the Raiders. Crawford missed three games with a calf injury before returning to play in London against the Jacksonville Jaguars, tallying two tackles, a sack, a quarterback pressure, and a forced fumble. He suffered a right broken thumb against the New York Giants and was placed on the injured reserve list on 26 November. Crawford appeared in six games as a reserve player, making seven tackles (one for loss), two sacks, two quarterback pressures, and a forced fumble.

In 2015, Crawford played in every game (one start) at both defensive tackle and defensive end, finishing with 18 tackles (three for loss), four sacks, 10 quarterback pressures and one pass defensed. He had four tackles in the season finale against the Washington Redskins.

On 4 April 2016, Crawford re-signed with the Cowboys on a one-year, $1.1 million contract. He made a career-high 10 starts, mostly at left defensive end, posting 27 tackles, 3.5 sacks (fifth on the team) and 12 quarterback pressures (fifth on the team). During the games, Crawford was used at multiple positions along the defensive line. He had four tackles, a sack, and one quarterback hurry in the second game against the Washington Redskins. Crawford made three tackles (two for loss), one sack and two quarterback hurries in the season finale against the Philadelphia Eagles.

=== Atlanta Falcons ===
On 9 March 2017, Crawford signed a three-year contract with the Atlanta Falcons. He was a backup defensive tackle, appearing in four games with five tackles and three quarterback hurries. On 3 October, Crawford was placed on the injured reserve list after suffering a bicep injury in Week 4.

In 2018, Crawford was named the starter at left defensive tackle after Dontari Poe left in free agency. He appeared in all 16 games with a career-high 11 starts, while finishing the season with 35 tackles (seven for loss), six sacks, nine quarterback hurries, a pass defensed, a forced fumble, and an interception. Crawford had four tackles and a half sack against the Cincinnati Bengals. He made four tackles, two sacks and one quarterback hurry against the Washington Redskins.

In 2019, Crawford was passed on the depth chart by Tyeler Davison in the fourth game of the season against the Tennessee Titans. Crawford appeared in all 16 games with four starts, collecting 27 tackles (one for loss) and a half sack. He had four tackles against the Minnesota Vikings and made four tackles against the Los Angeles Rams.

=== Tennessee Titans ===
On 8 April 2020, Crawford was signed by the Tennessee Titans. He was placed on the reserve/COVID-19 list by the team on 7 August. Crawford was activated on 20 August. He finished the 2020 season with 28 tackles, two sacks, and a forced fumble.

=== Arizona Cardinals ===
On 10 August 2021, Crawford signed with the Arizona Cardinals. He was placed on injured reserve on 24 August.

=== Retirement ===
Crawford announced his retirement on 17 May 2022 after 10 seasons in the NFL.

== NFL career statistics ==
Legend
**Bold**	Career high

=== Regular season ===
Year	Team	Games		Tackles					Interceptions					Fumbles			
Year	Team	GP	GS	Cmb	Solo	Ast	Sck	TFL	Int	Yds	TD	Lng	PD	FF	FR	Yds	TD
2012	OAK	4	0	3	2	1	0.0	0	0	0	0	0	0	0	0	0	0
2013	OAK	15	0	16	9	7	0.0	1	0	0	0	0	0	0	0	0	0
2014	DAL	6	0	8	6	2	2.0	2	0	0	0	0	0	**1**	0	0	0
2015	DAL	**16**	1	21	14	7	4.0	**7**	0	0	0	0	0	0	0	0	0
2016	DAL	**16**	10	25	12	13	3.5	3	0	0	0	0	0	0	0	0	0
2017	ATL	4	0	5	3	2	0.0	0	0	0	0	0	0	0	0	0	0
2018	ATL	**16**	**11**	**35**	19	16	**6.0**	**7**	**1**	**6**	0	**6**	1	**1**	0	0	0
2019	ATL	**16**	4	24	6	**18**	0.5	1	0	0	0	0	**3**	0	0	0	0
2020	TEN	**16**	9	28	**20**	8	2.0	3	0	0	0	0	0	**1**	0	0	0
Total		109	35	165	91	74	18.0	24	1	6	0	6	4	3	0	0	0

=== Playoffs ===
Year	Team	Games		Tackles					Interceptions					Fumbles			
Year	Team	GP	GS	Cmb	Solo	Ast	Sck	TFL	Int	Yds	TD	Lng	PD	FF	FR	Yds	TD
2016	DAL	**1**	0	**1**	0	**1**	0.0	0	0	0	0	0	0	0	0	0	0
2020	TEN	**1**	0	0	0	0	0.0	0	0	0	0	0	0	0	0	0	0
Total		2	0	1	0	1	0.0	0	0	0	0	0	0	0	0	0	0

== Media career ==
From 2023 onwards, Crawford became a co-commentator on NFL for ITV in the UK.
