= Eric Nzeocha =

German-born American football player (born 1993)

No. 46
- Position: Linebacker

Personal information
- Born: April 1, 1993 (age 33); Rothenburg ob der Tauber
- Listed height: 6 ft 3 in (1.91 m)
- Listed weight: 230 lb (104 kg)

Career information
- High school: Reichsstadt Gymnasium (Rothenburg, Germany)
- College: Wyoming
- NFL draft: 2017: undrafted

Career history
- Tampa Bay Buccaneers (2017–2018)*
- * Offseason or practice squad member only
- Stats at Pro Football Reference

Eric Nzeocha (born April 1, 1993) is a former German-born Nigerian American football linebacker. He was signed as an undrafted free agent by the Tampa Bay Buccaneers in 2017. He played college football at Wyoming.

== Early life ==
Nzeocha attended high school at Reichsstadt Gymnasium Rothenburg. He began playing flag football for the Franken Knights youth team, before moving up to the Junior National Team of the Bavarian Football Association. He contributed to the German Junior National Team placing fourth in the U19 European Championship in Spain.

== College career ==
His international exposure earned him a scholarship to play for the University of Wyoming. As a redshirt freshman, he appeared in 11 games, playing on special teams. He was named to the Academic All-Conference team.

As a sophomore, he was a backup tight end in all 12 games, registering 8 receptions for 65 yards. He was named to the Academic All-Conference team for the second time.

As a junior, he was converted into a linebacker. He appeared in 11 games with 5 starts at middle linebacker. He posted 35 tackles (20 solo), one tackle for loss, one pass breakup and one forced fumble. He made eight tackles against the University of North Dakota and the United States Air Force Academy. He was named to the Academic All-Conference team for the third time in his career. As a senior, he was a backup at middle linebacker.

== Professional career ==
Nzeocha was signed as an undrafted free agent by the Tampa Bay Buccaneers after the 2017 NFL draft on May 25. He participated in the NFL's International Player Pathway program, and was the second German player to spend a season on Tampa Bay's practice squad. He was waived on September 2. On September 3, Nzeocha earned a spot on the 11-man practice squad as an international player. He signed a reserve/future contract with the Buccaneers on January 1, 2018.

On September 1, 2018, Nzeocha was waived by the Buccaneers and was re-signed to the practice squad the next day. He was released on January 7, 2019.

== Personal life ==
His brother Mark Nzeocha played linebacker for the San Francisco 49ers. Nzeocha is half Nigerian.
