= Gus Johnson (American football) =

American football player (born 1993)

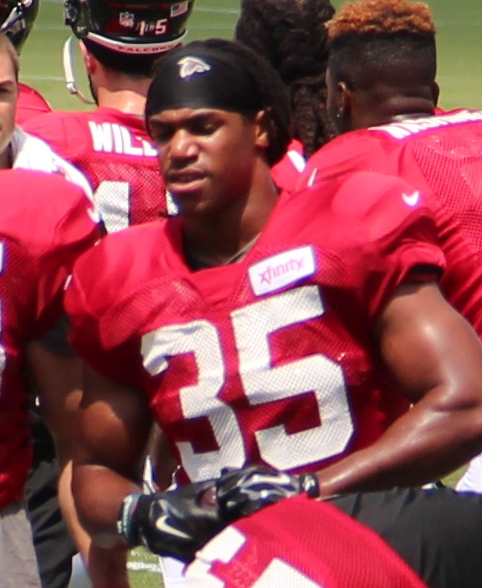
- Johnson in 2016

Profile
- Position: Running back

Personal information
- Born: August 10, 1993 (age 33); Gilmer, Texas, U.S.
- Listed height: 5 ft 10 in (1.78 m)
- Listed weight: 215 lb (98 kg)

Career information
- High school: Gilmer (TX)
- College: Stephen F. Austin
- NFL draft: 2015: undrafted

Career history
- Oakland Raiders (2015)*; Dallas Cowboys (2015)*; Atlanta Falcons (2015–2016)*; San Diego Chargers (2016)*; Atlanta Falcons (2016)*; San Diego Chargers (2016)*; Pittsburgh Steelers (2016–2017)*
- * Offseason or practice squad member only

Awards and highlights
- Southland Conference Player of the Year (2014); 2× All-Southland Conference (2013, 2014); Second-team All-Southland Conference (2012)
- Stats at Pro Football Reference

Gus Johnson (born August 10, 1993) is an American former professional football running back. He played college football at Stephen F. Austin State University.

== Early life ==
Johnson attended Gilmer High School, before moving on to Stephen F. Austin State University, where he was a three-year starter at running back.

As a senior, he set the school's and conference single-season rushing record rushing record with 1,683 yards. With his 23 rushing touchdowns, he tied the single-game school record with 4 rushing touchdowns against Incarnate Word and set the school single-season record for points in a season (138). He also left as the school's record in career rushing yards (3,907), career rushing touchdowns (51) and career total touchdowns (52).

== Professional career ==
=== Oakland Raiders ===
After going undrafted in the 2015 NFL draft, Johnson signed with the Oakland Raiders on May 8, 2015. On May 11, 2015, he was waived by the Raiders.

=== Dallas Cowboys ===
Johnson received a tryout invitation for the Dallas Cowboys minicamp. On July 28, 2015, he was signed to improve the team's depth, after running back Ryan Williams was released.

Because of injuries to top running backs Joseph Randle, Darren McFadden and Lance Dunbar, he was forced into taking the majority of the reps in practice and in games. He had a good preseason, starting the first and fourth games, finishing as the team's rushing leader (37 carries for 139 yards and 2 touchdowns) and earning the nickname "Gus the Bus".

On September 5, he was waived and signed to the practice squad three days later. He was cut on September 17, only to be re-signed to the practice squad five days later. He was released on October 20.

=== Atlanta Falcons ===
On October 27, 2015, the Atlanta Falcons signed Johnson to the practice squad. On August 27, 2016, Johnson was waived by the Falcons.

=== San Diego Chargers ===
On August 29, 2016, the San Diego Chargers claimed Johnson off waivers to replace Branden Oliver, who tore his Achilles tendon in the third preseason game. On September 3, 2016, he was released by the Chargers.

=== Second stint with the Falcons ===
On September 5, 2016, the Atlanta Falcons signed Johnson to their practice squad. On September 13, he was released from their practice squad.

=== Second stint with the Chargers ===
On December 27, 2016, Johnson was signed to the Chargers' practice squad.

=== Pittsburgh Steelers ===
On January 11, 2017, Johnson was signed to the Steelers' practice squad. He signed a reserve/future contract with the Steelers on January 24, 2017. He was released by the Steelers on May 2, 2017.
