= Redemptorist High School =

Location
- 4000 St. Gerard Avenue; Baton Rouge, (East Baton Rouge Parish), Louisiana 70805; United States
- 30°29′50″N 91°8′59″W

Information
- School type: Private, Coeducational
- Denomination: Roman Catholic
- Established: 1947
- Closed: June 30, 2015
- Principal: Dary Glueck
- Grades: 7–12
- Colors: Emerald Green and White
- Fight song: "The Victors"
- Nickname: Wolves Mascot: Chinook
- Rival: Parkview Baptist
- Accreditation: Southern Association of Colleges and Schools
- Newspaper: The Wolfhowls
- Yearbook: The EMERALD
- Website: rhsbr.org

Redemptorist Upper School was a parochial Roman Catholic high school in North Baton Rouge, Louisiana, supervised by the Roman Catholic Diocese of Baton Rouge.

== History ==
St. Gerard Majella Church Parish was established in 1944. St. Gerard High School was opened in September 1947, with an enrollment of forty-three freshmen and sophomores. Louisiana accreditation was obtained in December 1950, and the first class graduated in May of that year with 10 graduates. 1957-58 Unit I (first wing) of the permanent school complex opens. In 1958, it was accredited by the Southern Association of Colleges and Schools. St. Gerard Parish operated the high school until it became an interparochial school in 1963. 1959-60 Units II and III of the school open. Redemptorist then became a Regional Diocesan School on July 1, 1995. The school was governed by a Regional Diocesan School Board consisting of priests and elected and appointed laypersons. The faculty consisted of laymen and laywomen, one priest, and one Redemptorist Brother.

St. Gerard Elementary and St. Isidore Elementary merged into each other to become Redemptorist Elementary in the 2010-11 school year. Redemptorist elementary and Redemptorist High merged into the Redemptorist Schools of Baton Rouge in the 2011-12 school year under the supervision of Mr. Brian Menard. It was announced on December 19, 2014 that Redemptorist High School and Junior High School would close their doors for good on June 30, 2015.

The grounds of the former school were inundated by up to 4 feet (1.2 m) of water during the historic August 2016 flooding of south Louisiana and the buildings were subsequently demolished in the same year. The vacant land was donated to Cristo Rey High School who installed temporary buildings on the site.

Former State Representative and Louisiana Board of Regents member Vic Stelly taught and coached at Redemptorist during the early 1960s. Actress Donna Douglas (The Beverly Hillbillies), then known as Doris Smith, attended St. Gerard's High School.

== Athletics ==
- Redemptorist won 4 football state championships; 1959, 2002 (Class 3A), 2003 (Class 4A), 2005 (Class 3A).
- 1951-52 4 State Boxing Champions
- 1965 Wolves win Louisiana AA State Baseball Championship.
- 1967-69 Wolves win consecutive State AA Basketball Championships.
- 1977-78 Wolves win consecutive State AAA Basketball Championships.
- 2001-03 Wolves win consecutive Div III State Wrestling Championships.
- 2006-07 Wolves win consecutive Men's Track and Field AAA State Championship
- 2009 Wolves win Men's Track and Field AAA State Championship

== Closing ==
Redemptorist High School graduated its last class in May 2015. The high school closed due to plunging enrollment and funds. Redemptorist High is the second high school in the North Baton Rouge area to close since 2014.

== Notable alumni ==
- Donna Douglas actress notable for her role as Elly Mae Clampett in The Beverly Hillbillies TV series
- Justin Rogers (2006), American football cornerback, Richmond Spiders and Buffalo Bills
- Jeremy Hill, American football running back, LSU Tigers and Cincinnati Bengals
- La'el Collins, American football offensive linemen, LSU Tigers and Dallas Cowboys
- Howard Carter (basketball), 3-time All State MVP, American professional basketball player, LSU Tigers and Denver Nuggets
- Russell Gage, American football wide receiver, LSU Tigers football, Atlanta Falcons, and Tampa Bay Buccaneers.
