= Joel Ross (American football) =

American football player (born 1992)

No. 28
- Position: Cornerback

Personal information
- Born: June 12, 1992 (age 34); Damascus, Maryland, U.S.
- Listed height: 5 ft 10 in (1.78 m)
- Listed weight: 190 lb (86 kg)

Career information
- High school: Damascus (MD)
- College: Appalachian State
- NFL draft: 2015: undrafted

Career history
- Dallas Cowboys (2015)*; Tampa Bay Buccaneers (2015–2016)*; Chicago Bears (2016)*; Calgary Stampeders (2016–2017)*; Hamilton Tiger-Cats (2018)*; Baltimore Brigade (2019)
- * Offseason or practice squad member only
- Stats at CFL.ca

Joel Orville Ross (born June 12, 1992) is an American former football cornerback. He played college football at Appalachian State.

== Professional career ==
=== Tampa Bay Buccaneers ===
Ross signed with the Tampa Bay Buccaneers on December 30, 2015.

=== Chicago Bears ===
On August 3, 2016, Ross signed with the Chicago Bears. On August 28, 2016, Ross was waived by the Bears.

=== Baltimore Brigade ===
Ross was assigned to the Baltimore Brigade of the Arena Football League on July 19, 2019.
