= La'el Collins =

American football player (born 1993)

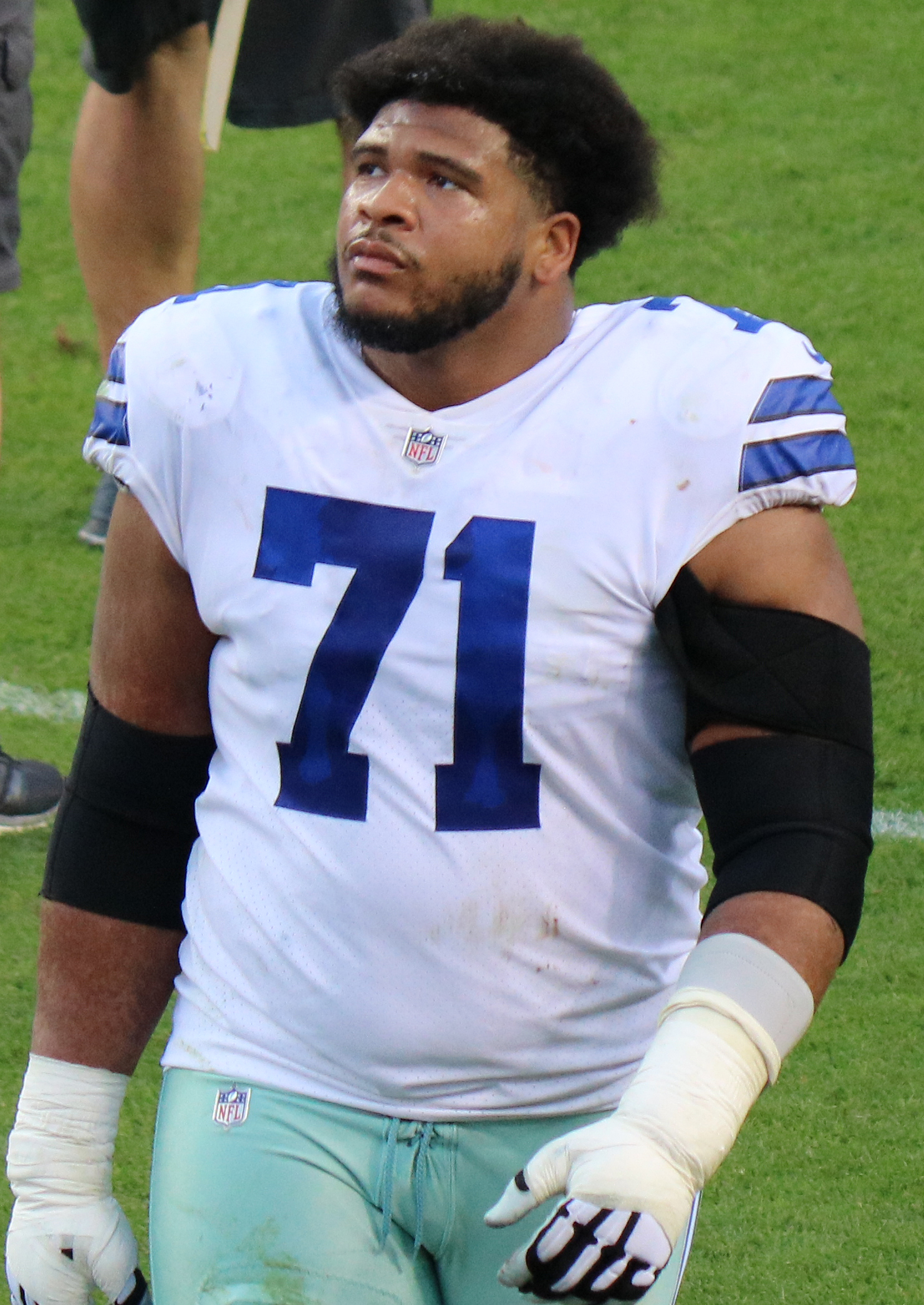
- Collins with the Dallas Cowboys in 2017

Profile
- Position: Offensive tackle

Personal information
- Born: July 26, 1993 (age 33); Baton Rouge, Louisiana, U.S.
- Listed height: 6 ft 4 in (1.93 m)
- Listed weight: 315 lb (143 kg)

Career information
- High school: Redemptorist (Baton Rouge, Louisiana)
- College: LSU (2011–2014)
- NFL draft: 2015: undrafted

Career history
- Dallas Cowboys (2015–2021); Cincinnati Bengals (2022–2023); Dallas Cowboys (2023)*; Buffalo Bills (2024)*; Dallas Cowboys (2025)*
- * Offseason or practice squad member only

Awards and highlights
- Jacobs Blocking Trophy (2014); Second-team All-American (2014); First-team All-SEC (2014); Second-team All-SEC (2013)

Career NFL statistics
- Games played: 89
- Games started: 86
- Stats at Pro Football Reference

La'el Collins (born July 26, 1993; pronounced /lɑːʔˈɛl/) is an American professional football offensive tackle. He played college football at LSU, where he won the Jacobs Blocking Trophy, recognizing the Southeastern Conference's (SEC) top offensive lineman, in 2014. Collins signed with the Dallas Cowboys as an undrafted free agent in 2015 and played there until 2021. He has not made an active NFL roster since a two year stint with the Cincinnati Bengals from 2022 to 2023.

== Early life ==
A native of Baton Rouge, Louisiana, Collins attended Redemptorist High School, where he was named to the Louisiana 3A All-State team in each of his final three seasons. Paving the way for running back Jeremy Hill, Collins helped lead Redemptorist to a LHSAA Class 3A state quarterfinals berth in his senior year, where the team lost to Patterson, which was led by running back Kenny Hilliard. After the season, Collins played in the Under Armour All-America Game and was also named All-American by Parade and USA Today.

Regarded as a five-star prospect by every major recruiting source, Collins was listed as one of the premier offensive tackle prospects in the class of 2011. Rivals.com ranked him second behind only Cyrus Kouandjio, while ESPN had him in third place, behind Kouandjio and Christian Westerman. Collins had offers from almost every major program in the country, including Auburn, Florida State, and Southern California, but committed early to Louisiana State in September 2009.

== College career ==
In his true freshman year in 2011, Collins played in seven games with no starts. In a total of 46 snaps on the offensive line, he posted five knockdown blocks and was recognized as a Freshman All-American by CBSSports.com after the season. As a sophomore, Collins started all 13 games for LSU, replacing Will Blackwell at left guard, and led the team in both total snaps (836) and knockdowns (64.5). He was named Southeastern Conference (SEC) Offensive Lineman of the Week after playing all 84 offensive snaps at #1 Alabama, helping the Tigers to compile 22 first downs, 139 yards rushing, and 296 passing against the nation's No. 1 defense. Having played every offensive snap in LSU's last eleven games, Collins earned honorable mention All-SEC honors by the Associated Press (AP).

In his junior season, Collins was moved to left tackle, filling the void left by Chris Faulk. Quickly adjusting to his new position, he earned SEC Offensive Lineman of the Week honors after playing all but one snap in a 37–27 over Texas Christian in the season-opener. Collins went on to start twelve games at left tackle, only missing the Furman game in October. Louisiana State's offense accounted for school-record 465.9 total yards per game, which included 200.8 rushing and 256.8 passing, and a school-record 37 rushing touchdowns.

Collins turned down an opportunity to enter the 2014 NFL draft to return to LSU for his senior season. He started all 13 games at left tackle, leading the team in both offensive snaps (843) and knockdowns (88). The Tigers offense rushed for an average of 224.5 yards a game, the most by the team since averaging 256.6 in 1997. After the season, Collins was awarded the Jacobs Blocking Trophy, given annually to the top offensive lineman in the SEC as voted on by the league’s coaches, as the first LSU Tiger to win since Ciron Black in 2009. Collins was also voted First-team All-SEC by the league's coaches and the AP. Both USA Today and AP named him second-team All-American.

== Professional career ==
=== Pre-draft ===
Regarded as a first round pick in the 2015 NFL draft and a likely top ten prospect, Collins started to drop when it was announced that he was scheduled to talk to the Louisiana State police days after the draft, about the shooting death of a pregnant woman with whom he previously had a relationship, even though he was not considered a suspect in the crime. He eventually went undrafted after his agents threatened that he would sit out the season and enter the 2016 NFL draft, if any NFL team selected him after the third round.

Pre-draft measurables
Height	Weight	Arm length	Hand span	40-yard dash	10-yard split	20-yard split	20-yard shuttle	Three-cone drill	Vertical jump	Broad jump	Bench press
6 ft 4 1/2 in (1.94 m)	305 lb (138 kg)	33 1/4 in (0.84 m)	10 3/8 in (0.26 m)	5.12 s	1.87 s	3.04 s	4.63 s	7.70 s	27 in (0.69 m)	9 ft 0 in (2.74 m)	21 reps
All values from NFL Combine

=== Dallas Cowboys (first stint) ===
On May 7, 2015, Collins signed as an undrafted free agent with the Dallas Cowboys. His entire three-year contract was guaranteed and worth $1,599,000 with a $21,000 signing bonus. After opening the season as a reserve offensive guard, he saw extensive action in the second game as part of the rotation that replaced an injured Ronald Leary and was later declared the starter for the third game. He eventually passed Leary on the depth chart and was promoted as the starter at left guard during the week 6 bye. He was declared inactive with a high left ankle sprain for the last game against the Washington Redskins.

In 2016, he began the season as the starter at left guard over Leary, but suffered a torn ligament in his right big toe in the third game against the Chicago Bears and was placed on injured reserve on October 4. He was limited to three starts in three games.

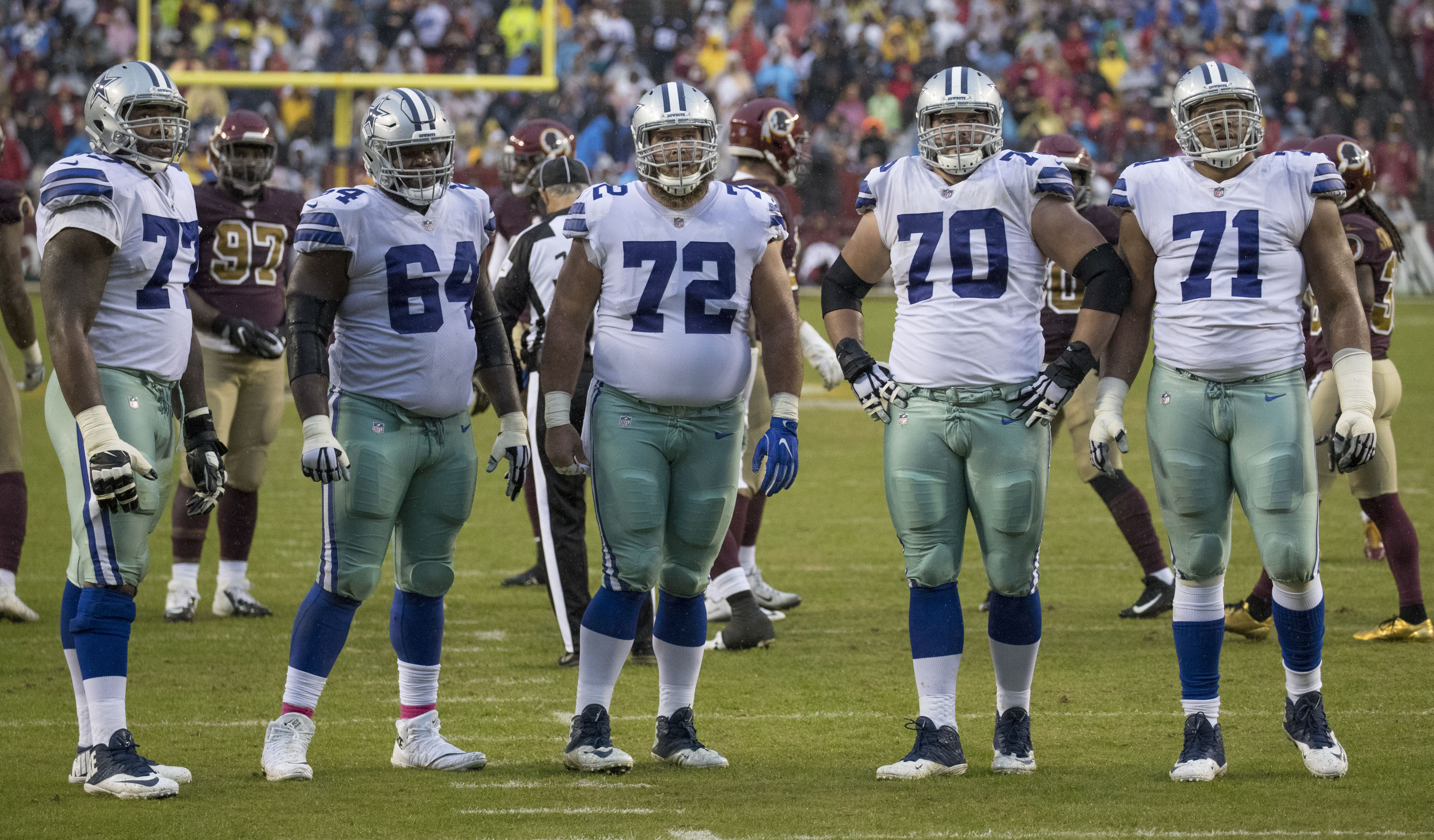
The Cowboys' offensive line vs Washington in 2017

In 2017, following the retirement of Doug Free, Collins moved over to right tackle and was named the starter to begin the season. On July 25, 2017, Collins signed a two-year, $15.4 million contract extension through the 2019 season. He started all 16 games at right tackle, returning to the position he played during his college years.

In 2018, he started all 16 games at right tackle. He contributed to Dak Prescott throwing for over 4,000 yards and to Ezekiel Elliott winning his second rushing crown with 1,434 yards.

On September 3, 2019, Collins signed a five-year, $50 million contract extension with the Cowboys, keeping him on contract through the 2024 season. He started 15 games at right tackle. He missed the Week 6 game against the New York Jets with a knee injury. He was part of an offensive line that only yielded 23 sacks (second-fewest in the league).

In August 2020, he was involved in a car accident that caused a neck stinger. He also dealt with hip and groin injuries. On September 7, 2020, Collins was placed on injured reserve. He missed all of the season and undrafted rookie Terence Steele went on to start 14 games at right tackle in his place.

On September 10, 2021, Collins started the season opener at right tackle, before being suspended five games for violating the league’s substance abuse policy, because of multiple missed drug tests and trying to bribe the test collector. The original penalty was increased from 2 to 5 games after Collins decided to fight the suspension in court. He came back to action in Week 7, but didn’t immediately get his right tackle job, as the coaching staff decided to start Steele instead. He regained his starting right tackle position in Week 8 against the Denver Broncos, which also coincided with left tackle Tyron Smith injuring his ankle and missing 3 contests. In Week 12, on Thanksgiving Day against the Las Vegas Raiders, he was benched in favor of Steele. Collins returned as the starter the following week and remained there the rest of the season. In Week 14 against the Washington Football Team, he suffered from cramping in the second quarter and was ejected in the fourth quarter for fighting. He started in 10 of the 12 games he played.

In March 2022, the Cowboys gave Collins permission to seek a trade. On March 17, he was released with three years remaining on his contract.

=== Cincinnati Bengals ===
On March 20, 2022, Collins signed a three-year contract with the Cincinnati Bengals, reuniting with offensive line coach Frank Pollack, who had this same position with the Cowboys. He was placed on the non-football injury (NFI) list with a back injury at the start of training camp. His back injury lingered throughout the season, forcing him to have designated rest days during midweek practices. In a Week 16 matchup against the New England Patriots, he suffered in the first quarter a torn left ACL and MCL injury that ended his season. On December 30, he was placed on the injured reserve list. He started 15 games at right tackle. He was replaced with Hakeem Adeniji.

Collins was placed on the reserve/physically unable to perform list to start the 2023 season. He was released on September 12, 2023.

=== Dallas Cowboys (second stint) ===
On January 2, 2024, Collins was signed to the Dallas Cowboys practice squad. His contract expired when the teams season ended January 14, 2024.

=== Buffalo Bills ===
On April 9, 2024, Collins signed a one-year deal with the Buffalo Bills. He was released as part of final roster cuts on August 27.

=== Dallas Cowboys (third stint) ===
On August 2, 2025, Collins signed with the Dallas Cowboys. He was released on August 24.
