= Tim Scott (American football) =

American football player (born 1993)

No. 31
- Position: Safety

Personal information
- Born: January 25, 1993 (age 33); Fredericksburg, Virginia, U.S.
- Listed height: 5 ft 11 in (1.80 m)
- Listed weight: 195 lb (88 kg)

Career information
- High school: Colonial Forge (VA)
- College: North Carolina
- NFL draft: 2015: undrafted

Career history
- Dallas Cowboys (2015)*; Cleveland Browns (2015–2016)*; Washington Redskins (2017)*; New York Giants (2017); Arizona Cardinals (2018)*
- * Offseason or practice squad member only

Career NFL statistics
- Games played: 1
- Stats at Pro Football Reference

Tim Scott (born January 25, 1993) is an American former professional football player who was a safety in the National Football League (NFL) for the Dallas Cowboys, Cleveland Browns and New York Giants. He played college football for the North Carolina Tar Heels.

== Early life ==
Scott attended Colonial Forge High School. In football, he was a four-year starter, while playing at safety, wide receiver, running back and kick returner.

As a junior, he tallied 13 receptions for 221 yards, one receiving touchdown, 22 carries for 173 yards and one rushing touchdown.

As a senior, he received District defensive player of the year, second-team All-Washington Metro and All-Fredericksburg honors.

He also practiced basketball.

== College career ==
Scott accepted a football scholarship from the University of North Carolina. As a true freshman he appeared in 13 games with 8 starts at cornerback. He registered 43 tackles, one interception, 6 passes defensed (second on the team) and 2 quarterback hurries. He had 5 tackles (one for loss) against Clemson University. He made 9 tackles against East Carolina University.

As a sophomore, he started all 12 games at cornerback. He collected 48 tackles (sixth on the team), 5.5 tackles for loss, 4 interceptions (led the team) and 9 passes defensed (led the team). He had 6 tackles (one for loss) and one pass defensed against the University of Virginia. He made 6 tackles and one pass defensed against North Carolina State University. He had 6 tackles, one interception and 2 passes defensed against Virginia Tech University.

As a junior, he started all 13 games. He posted 49 tackles (one for loss), 2 interceptions, 3 passes defensed and 2 quarterback hurries and a tackle for loss. He had 6 tackles and one pass defensed against Boston College. He made 6 tackles against East Carolina University. He was switched to safety for the 2013 Belk Bowl, making 6 tackles and one sack.

As a senior, he started all 12 games, totaling 72 tackles (led the team), one interception, 7 passes defensed and one fumble return for a touchdown. He had 6 tackles against North Carolina State University. He had 9 tackles and one pass defensed against the University of Virginia. He had 7 tackles against Georgia Tech University.

== Professional career ==
=== Dallas Cowboys ===
Scott was signed as an undrafted free agent by the Dallas Cowboys after the 2015 NFL draft on May 9. He was waived on September 5, and was re-signed to the practice squad. He spent time on and off the Cowboys' practice squad throughout the season, before being released on December 1, 2015.

=== Cleveland Browns ===
On December 8, 2015, Scott was signed to the Cleveland Browns' practice squad. He signed a reserve/future contract with the team on January 5, 2016. He was waived by the Browns on August 30, 2016.

=== Washington Redskins ===
On August 3, 2017, Scott was signed by the Washington Redskins. He was waived on August 13, 2017.

=== New York Giants ===
On August 24, 2017, Scott was signed by the New York Giants. He was waived on September 1, 2017 and was re-signed to the practice squad. He was promoted to the active roster on November 4, 2017. He was waived on November 7, 2017. He was re-signed to the practice squad on December 12, 2017. He signed a reserve/future contract with the Giants on January 1, 2018. He was waived on May 22, 2018.

=== Arizona Cardinals ===
On August 10, 2018, Scott was signed by the Arizona Cardinals to a one-year contract. He was waived on September 1, 2018.
