= Mark Nzeocha =

German American football player (born 1990)

No. 53, 46
- Position: Linebacker

Personal information
- Born: January 19, 1990 (age 36); Ansbach, West Germany
- Listed height: 6 ft 3 in (1.91 m)
- Listed weight: 235 lb (107 kg)

Career information
- High school: FOS Ansbach
- College: Wyoming
- NFL draft: 2015: 7th round, 236th overall pick

Career history
- Dallas Cowboys (2015–2017); San Francisco 49ers (2017–2021)

Career NFL statistics
- Total tackles: 42
- Sacks: 1
- Forced fumbles: 1
- Pass deflections: 2
- Interceptions: 1
- Stats at Pro Football Reference

Mark Nzeocha (/ɛnˈzɒtʃə/ en-ZOTCH-ə; born January 19, 1990) is a German former professional American football linebacker. He played college football for the Wyoming Cowboys and was selected by the Dallas Cowboys in the seventh round of the 2015 NFL draft.

== Early life ==
Nzeocha attended high school at FOS Ansbach. He began playing flag football as a 13-year-old for the Franken Knights youth team, before moving up to the junior football team at 16.

He was a safety for the German National Team that won the 2008 European Junior Championships and that finished fifth in the 2009 IFAF Junior World Cup in Canton, Ohio. He received recognition by being named to the All-tournament team.

== College career ==
His international exposure earned him a scholarship to play for the University of Wyoming. As a freshman, he played as an outside linebacker in 10 games, before being moved to free safety during the latter part of the season. The next year, he was moved to strong safety, finishing with 11 games played (two starts), 32 tackles and a forced fumble.

After earning the starting strongside linebacker position as a junior, he had a break-out season with 101 tackles (10 for loss), one sack, two forced fumbles and two passes defensed.

In his last year, he was playing strongside linebacker in the base defense, middle linebacker in the nickel defense, and was a core special teams player. He was also leading the team in multiple defensive categories, before suffering a season-ending torn ACL in the seventh game against San Jose State University, finishing with 59 tackles (three for loss), two sacks, two forced fumbles, and five passes defensed. He was named to the Academic All-Conference team in three-straight seasons.

== Professional career ==
=== Dallas Cowboys ===
Nzeocha was selected by the Dallas Cowboys in the seventh round (236th overall) of the 2015 NFL draft. The San Diego Chargers previously traded this pick to Dallas in exchange for Sean Lissemore. Due to his limited football experience, Nzeocha was targeted primarily because of his athletic ability. Entering the league as a 25-year-old rookie, he missed the entire preseason while recovering from a knee injury he suffered in college. Nzeocha began the regular season on the reserve/non-football injury list and was activated until November 18. He only played in two games and was declared inactive for five.

In 2016, Nzeocha was used at middle linebacker during the preseason, posting an interception against the Los Angeles Rams. He suffered a strained Achilles tendon in the second game against the Miami Dolphins, which not only forced him to miss the rest of the preseason but also the first four games of the regular season. Nzeocha played in five games mainly on special teams and was declared inactive in seven contests.

In 2017, Nzeocha was the backup of middle linebacker Anthony Hitchens during organized team activities. On June 6, Nzeocha had his knee scoped, which delayed the start of his training camp. On September 3, he was released after the team acquired linebacker Jayrone Elliott in a trade and was re-signed to the practice squad.

=== San Francisco 49ers ===
On September 25, 2017, Nzeocha was signed by the San Francisco 49ers off the Cowboys' practice squad. He appeared in 10 games with no starts and had four special teams tackles.

On January 26, 2018, Nzeocha signed a one-year extension with the 49ers. In December 2018, he received the most number of fan votes (183,150) among all special teams players eligible for the Pro Bowl, with 80% of his votes (146,520) coming from his native country Germany, but he ultimately was not selected for the All-star game after the player and coach voting were calculated. He appeared in 16 games with 3 starts, while making 17 defensive tackles, one sack, one pass defensed, one forced fumble and seven special teams tackles.

On March 15, 2019, Nzeocha signed a three-year contract extension with the 49ers. During the season-opener against the Tampa Bay Buccaneers, Nzeocha intercepted Jameis Winston once in the 31–17 victory. The 49ers reached Super Bowl LIV but they lost to the Kansas City Chiefs by a score of 31–20. He appeared in 16 games with no starts, registering two defensive tackles, one interception, one pass defensed and seven special teams tackles.

On September 30, 2020, Nzeocha was placed on the short-term injured reserve with a strained quadriceps. On December 19, 2020, Nzeocha was activated off of injured reserve. He appeared in five games with no starts and made two special teams tackles.

The 49ers declined to exercise the 2021 contract year on Nzeocha's contract on March 5, 2021, making him an unrestricted free agent at the start of the new league year. On December 29, 2021, Nzeocha was signed to the 49ers practice squad. On January 1, 2022, he was elevated to the active roster and reverted to the team's practice squad on January 3. On January 8, 2022, he was elevated to the active roster and reverted to the team's practice squad on January 10. On January 15, 2022, he was elevated to the active roster and reverted to the team's practice squad on January 17. On January 21, 2022, he was elevated to the active roster and reverted to the team's practice squad on January 24. On January 29, 2022, he was elevated to the active roster and reverted to the team's practice squad on December 31. He was not re-signed after the season.

== Personal life ==
Nzeocha's brother, Eric Nzeocha played linebacker for the Tampa Bay Buccaneers. He is half Nigerian. He is now a licensed real estate agent in Prosper, Texas.
