= Devin Street =

American football player (born 1991)

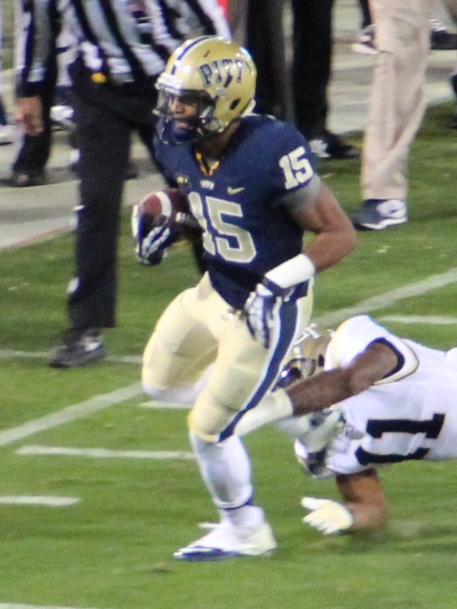
- Street during his tenure at Pittsburgh

No. 15, 17, 81
- Position: Wide receiver

Personal information
- Born: March 30, 1991 (age 35); Bethlehem, Pennsylvania, U.S.
- Listed height: 6 ft 3 in (1.91 m)
- Listed weight: 200 lb (91 kg)

Career information
- High school: Liberty (Bethlehem)
- College: Pittsburgh
- NFL draft: 2014: 5th round, 146th overall pick

Career history
- Dallas Cowboys (2014–2015); New England Patriots (2016)*; Indianapolis Colts (2016); New England Patriots (2017)*; New York Jets (2017)*; Houston Texans (2017)*
- * Offseason or practice squad member only

Awards and highlights
- Second-team All-Big East (2012); Third-team All-ACC (2013)

Career NFL statistics
- Receptions: 10
- Receiving yards: 152
- Receiving touchdowns: 1
- Stats at Pro Football Reference

Devin Curtis Street (born March 30, 1991) is an American former professional football player who was a wide receiver in the National Football League (NFL). He played college football for the Pittsburgh Panthers and was selected by the Dallas Cowboys in the fifth round of the 2014 NFL draft.

== Early life ==
Street attended Liberty High School in Bethlehem, Pennsylvania. As a senior, he registered 49 receptions for 822 yards and eight touchdowns, while making 50 tackles and 2 interceptions as a starting cornerback on defense. He helped lead Liberty to a 15-1 record and the PIAA Class AAAA championship, and had a vital touchdown in the team's 28–21 overtime victory in the title game against Bethel Park. He was a second-team All-state Class AAAA selection and was considered a two-star recruit by Rivals.com. During his time with the team, he helped achieve a 53–7 record (.883) and 3 state title game appearances.

He was also a track and field standout, winning the District XI championship in the long jump, where he set a school and district record (7.22 meters).

== College career ==
Street accepted a football scholarship from the University of Pittsburgh. In 2009, he was redshirted as a freshman. In 2010, he appeared in all 13 games (4 starts), making 25 receptions (fourth on the team) for 318 yards (12.7 avg.) and two touchdowns, highlighted by a 79-yard screen pass for touchdown against Syracuse.

In 2011, Street started all 13 games, leading the team with 53 receptions for 754 yards (14.2 avg.) and two touchdowns, including reaching 100-yard receiving in a game three times. In 2012, on his way to being named a second-team All-Big East Conference selection, he led the team with 73 catches for 975 yards (13.4 avg.) and five touchdowns. His 11 catches against Louisville marked a career-high and were the most by a Pitt player since 2006.

In 2013, he was second on the team with 51 catches for 854 yards (16.7 avg.) and seven touchdowns. He earned third-team All-Atlantic Coast Conference (ACC) honors. He set a school record with 202 career receptions, surpassing Latef Grim's 178 set from 1998 to 2000.

== Professional career ==
=== Dallas Cowboys ===
Looking to improve their wide receiver depth after the release of Miles Austin, the Dallas Cowboys traded their fifth (158th overall) and one of their seventh round draft choices (229th overall) to the Detroit Lions, in order to move up in the fifth round (146th overall) of the 2014 NFL draft and select Street. As a rookie, he was active in all 16 games, but was rarely used as the team's fifth wide receiver. At the fifth wide receiver spot Street finished the year with seven targets, two receptions for 18 yards.

In 2015, there was talk of a notable improvement in his game, but he suffered an ankle injury in training camp that stunted his progress and sidelined him at different times. He struggled with incompletions, fumbles and penalties, so the team traded for wide receiver Brice Butler after Dez Bryant broke his foot in the season opener. Although Street was given the opportunity to establish himself as a starter during Bryant's absence, Butler passed him on the depth chart. Street hauled in a 25-yard touchdown pass against the New York Giants. It was his first career touchdown and he caught it in style. The ball was thrown by Matt Cassel, who was filling in for Tony Romo during an injury, and the ball was thrown to Street slightly out of bounds, but still managed to reach out and catch it just in bounds. He finished the year with only 13 targets, 7 receptions for 114 yards and one touchdown.

In the 2016 training camp, he was passed on the depth chart by other wide receivers. He was released on September 3.

=== New England Patriots (first stint) ===
On September 5, 2016, Street was signed to the practice squad of the New England Patriots.

=== Indianapolis Colts ===
On September 21, 2016, he was signed by the Indianapolis Colts off the Patriots practice squad. He was released on November 23, and was signed to the practice squad the next day. He was promoted back to the active roster on December 12. He finished the year with only one reception for 20 yards. On May 1, 2017, Street was waived by the Colts.

=== New England Patriots (second stint) ===
On May 2, 2017, Street was claimed off waivers by the Patriots. He was released on May 24.

=== New York Jets ===
On June 5, 2017, Street was signed by the New York Jets. He was waived on July 26.

=== Houston Texans ===
On July 27, 2017, Street was claimed off waivers by the Houston Texans. He was waived/injured on August 23, and placed on the injured reserve list. He was released on August 30, 2017.
