= Doug Free =

American football player (born 1984)

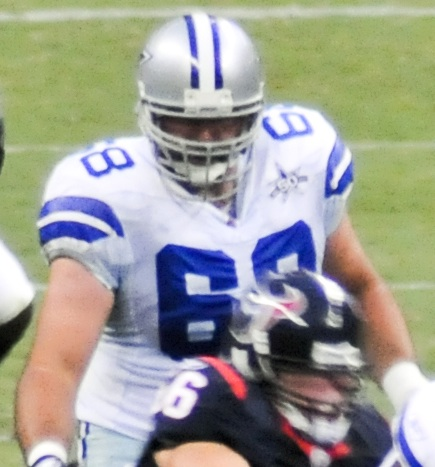
- Free with the Dallas Cowboys in 2010

No. 68
- Position: Offensive tackle

Personal information
- Born: January 16, 1984 (age 42); Manitowoc, Wisconsin, U.S.
- Listed height: 6 ft 6 in (1.98 m)
- Listed weight: 318 lb (144 kg)

Career information
- High school: Lincoln (Manitowoc)
- College: Northern Illinois (2002–2006)
- NFL draft: 2007: 4th round, 122nd overall pick

Career history
- Dallas Cowboys (2007–2016)

Awards and highlights
- Built Ford Tough Offensive Line of the Year (2016); 2× All-MAC (2005, 2006); Second-team All-MAC (2004)

Career NFL statistics
- Games played: 124
- Games started: 114
- Fumble recoveries: 2
- Stats at Pro Football Reference

Douglas Free (born January 16, 1984) is an American former professional football player who was an offensive tackle in the National Football League (NFL) for the Dallas Cowboys. He was selected by the Cowboys in the fourth round of the 2007 NFL draft. He played college football for the Northern Illinois Huskies.

== Early life ==
Free attended Lincoln High School in Manitowoc, Wisconsin. As a junior, he received All-Fox Valley Conference honors.

As a senior, he was named Defensive lineman of the Year, All-state, and All-Fox Valley Conference on both offense (tight end) and defense (defensive tackle). He tallied 64 tackles, 8 sacks, 6 fumble-cause hits, 5 passes defensed, 2 fumble recoveries, 7 blocked kicks, 6 receptions for 141 yards, one touchdown.

== College career ==
Free accepted a football scholarship from Northern Illinois University, with the plan of being converted into an offensive tackle. As a redshirt freshman, he was forced to start at left tackle, when sophomore tackle Shea Fitzgerald was killed along with 12 others, in a back porch collapse during a party in Lincoln Park, in Chicago, Illinois. He had 10 starts at left tackle and 2 at tight end.

As a sophomore, he developed into an athletic player that earned him the nickname "Doug Freak" among his teammates. He settled at left tackle with 12 starts and was named second-team All-MAC.

As a junior, he started 12 games at left tackle, receiving first-team All-MAC and honorable mention All-American honors.

== Professional career ==
Free was selected in the fourth round (122nd overall) of the 2007 NFL draft by the Dallas Cowboys. As a rookie, he was named a starter in his first preseason game, but suffered a knee sprain that would delayed his development and contributed to him being inactive for the first 15 games of the season, until playing at right tackle during the fourth quarter of the last game.

He was declared inactive during the first 13 weeks of the 2008 season. The next year, a season-ending injury to Marc Colombo pushed him into starting seven games at right tackle, performing at a high level while allowing only one sack. After the April 1, 2010 release of Flozell Adams, Free became the starting left tackle.

On July 26, 2011, the Cowboys avoided him testing the free agent market and rewarded him with a four-year, $32 million contract, with $17 million guaranteed.

In 2012, the team decided to move him back to right tackle after his play regressed; exchanging positions with Tyron Smith. He was still seen as a liability even with the change, so the team gave more playing time to Jermey Parnell in the final four games of the season.

After having to share his playing time and giving up seven sacks, five holding penalties and seven false starts, he accepted a reduced salary in order to avoid being waived before the start of the 2013 season.

In 2014, he was a starter in what was arguably considered the best offensive line in the league and also emerged as the unit's leader. In October, he suffered a sprained right foot in the last minutes of the Week 6 win against the Seattle Seahawks, causing him to miss three games. He also missed the team's last four games (including two in the playoffs) with a left ankle stress fracture, which led him to have off season surgery.

On March 7, 2015, Free re-signed with the Cowboys on a three-year, $15 million contract. He started all 16 games and although he was a solid contributor at right tackle, he led the team in penalties (nine).

In 2016, he was a part of what was considered the best offensive line in the NFL. He started all 16 games, even though he was limited with foot and ankle injuries. On March 11, 2017, Free announced his retirement from the NFL after 10 seasons.
