= Joseph Randle =

American football player (born 1991)

No. 21
- Position: Running back

Personal information
- Born: December 29, 1991 (age 34); Wichita, Kansas, U.S.
- Listed height: 6 ft 0 in (1.83 m)
- Listed weight: 210 lb (95 kg)

Career information
- High school: Wichita Southeast
- College: Oklahoma State
- NFL draft: 2013: 5th round, 151st overall pick

Career history
- Dallas Cowboys (2013–2015)

Awards and highlights
- 2× First-team All-Big 12 (2011, 2012)

Career NFL statistics
- Rushing yards: 822
- Rushing average: 4.5
- Rushing touchdowns: 9
- Receptions: 22
- Receiving yards: 170
- Stats at Pro Football Reference

Joseph David Randle (born December 29, 1991) is an American former professional football player who was a running back in the National Football League (NFL) for the Dallas Cowboys. He was selected by the Cowboys in the fifth round of the 2013 NFL draft. He played college football for the Oklahoma State Cowboys.

== Early life ==
Randle attended Wichita Southeast High School in Wichita, Kansas, where he played football and ran track. As a junior, he was an All-metro and All-league performer. As a senior, he rushed for 1,200 yards and 12 touchdowns, receiving first-team All-state on defense, second-team All-state on offense and All-league honors. In his high school career he rushed for over 3,600 yards.

Also a standout track & field athlete, Randle participated in the sprinting events and was a state qualifier in the long jump and triple jump. At the 2009 Jock's Nitch/PSU Gorilla Relays, he ran the 400-meter dash in a PR 57.02 seconds on his way to an 11th-place finish. He recorded a career-best leap of 6.65 meters in the long jump at the 2010 North East Track Classic, where he took silver. He also earned a second-place finish in the triple jump at the 2010 KSHSAA 6A Regional, with a leap of 13.55 meters.

Considered a four-star recruit by Rivals.com, Randle was rated as the 25th best running back in the nation. He accepted a scholarship to Oklahoma State.

== College career ==
Randle accepted a football scholarship from Oklahoma State University. As a freshman in 2010, he was a backup behind Kendall Hunter, making 82 carries for 452 yards, 2 rushing touchdowns, 37 receptions (fourth on the team) for 427 yards (fourth on the team) and one receiving touchdown.

As a sophomore in 2011, he was named the regular starter at running back, he had 208 carries for 1,216 yards, 24 rushing touchdowns, 43 receptions (fourth on the team) for 266 yards, 2 receiving touchdowns and was named All-Big 12. The 24 rushing touchdowns were second most in school history, behind College Football Hall of Famer Barry Sanders who had 37 in 1989. He rushed for 152 yards and 4 touchdowns against Baylor University.

As a junior in 2012, he was the Big-12 Conference's leading rusher with 1,417 yards, scored 14 touchdowns and earned first-team All-conference honors. He declared for the NFL draft after the season.

=== College statistics ===
Year	G	Rushing						Receiving						Kick returns				
Year	G	Att	Gain	Avg	TD	Long	Avg/G	Rec	Yards	Avg	TD	Long	Avg/G	No.	Yards	Avg	TD	Long
2010	13	82	452	5.5	2	39	34.8	37	427	11.5	1	38	7.5	11	282	25.6	0	40
2011	13	208	1,216	5.8	24	62	93.5	43	266	6.2	2	63	19.1	0	0	0.0	0	0
2012	13	274	1,417	5.2	14	69	109.0	28	224	8.0	0	21	12.8	0	0	0.0	0	0
Total*	39	564	3,085	5.5	40	69	79.1	108	917	8.5	3	63	13.3	11	282	25.6	0	40

== Professional career ==
Pre-draft measurables
Height	Weight	Arm length	Hand span	Wingspan	40-yard dash	10-yard split	20-yard split	20-yard shuttle	Three-cone drill	Vertical jump	Broad jump	Wonderlic
6 ft 0 in (1.83 m)	204 lb (93 kg)	31 3/4 in (0.81 m)	8 3/4 in (0.22 m)	6 ft 4 1/8 in (1.93 m)	4.52 s	1.57 s	2.67 s	4.23 s	7.01 s	35 in (0.89 m)	10 ft 3 in (3.12 m)	17
All values from NFL Combine/Pro Day

Randle was selected by the Dallas Cowboys in the fifth round (151st overall) of the 2013 NFL draft. He served as the backup running back for Pro Bowler DeMarco Murray and had a chance to start two games when Murray was injured. He finished his rookie season with 164 rushing yards and two touchdowns.

The next year, he was named the backup to Murray over Lance Dunbar. He finished the 2014 season with 51 carries, 343 yards and 3 touchdowns. His 6.7-yard rushing average would have ranked first in the league among running backs and second to the 7.1-yard average posted by quarterback Russell Wilson, but his 51 rushing attempts were not enough to qualify.

In 2015, he was named the starter after Murray left in free agency. He started the first 6 games, until suffering a strained oblique and being substituted against the New York Giants by Darren McFadden, who ran for 152 yards on 29 carries. On October 28, he was demoted to a reserve role and left the team's facility after learning the news and also being faced with a possible suspension by the league. On November 3, he was waived with the Cowboys mentioning that the main reason was to deal with an unspecified personal issue. On November 10, he was officially suspended 4 games for violating the NFL's personal conduct policy. He led the team with four rushing touchdowns for the season, even though he only played in 6 games.

== Legal trouble ==
On October 13, 2014, Randle was arrested at Dillard's department store in Frisco, Texas and later released on bond for Class B Theft of men's underwear and cologne valued between $50-$500. In July 2015, it was announced that Randle was put on 180 days of deferred adjudication probation, and that the theft charge could be set aside upon successful completion of probation.

On February 4, 2015, Randle was arrested in Kansas around 3:00 a.m. by Wichita Police for unlawful possession of marijuana. Officers showed up to the hotel where Randle was renting a room after receiving a report of domestic violence with a weapon. Police found Randle and a 22-year-old woman at the hotel and observed marijuana in the room. Randle was issued a notice to appear in front of a judge, but was not booked nor was a mug shot taken. In April 2015, the Wichita District Attorney's office announced that Randle would not face any charges, citing a lack of evidence.

On November 24, 2015, Randle was arrested at Kansas Star Casino in Mulvane, Kansas. Randle was allegedly drunk and had been asked to leave. While being escorted out, Randle spat on the floor and assaulted the casino security guards. His bond was set at $25,000.

On February 1, 2016, Randle was arrested at a home in Irving, Texas for an outstanding warrant for speeding. Bail was set at $359. This arrest took place approximately one week after Randle had been in court for his previous November 2015 arrest.

On February 21, 2016, Randle was arrested in Wichita, Kansas for aggravated battery, possession of drugs and criminal damage to property. During his first court appearance, Randle said that he could not afford a lawyer or bail and requested his bail to lowered to $5,000 from the current $100,000 so he could be released and continue working out to sign with another team. The judge denied his request. Randle was ordered to be held at the Sedgwick County jail in Wichita on four counts of aggravated battery with a deadly weapon, criminal destruction of property, and possession of hallucinogenics/marijuana. Randle was released on bond on March 3, 2016; however, his bond was rescinded three days later due to a failure to appear in court. Randle was then held on $150,000 bond for failure to appear and interference with law enforcement.

On February 9, 2017, Randle was arrested on charges of aggravated battery and disorderly conduct stemming from an altercation in a Kansas jail.

On April 22, 2017, Randle was convicted by a jury of aggravated battery, aggravated burglary, criminal threat and possession of marijuana. The jury also acquitted him of one count of aggravated battery. The jury was also hung on two other counts of aggravated battery and one count of criminal damage to property. Prosecutors will decide the following week if they want to retry Randle for the counts the jury was hung on.

On September 7, 2018, Randle was arrested on a suspicion of rape charge in his hometown of Wichita.

On December 3, 2021, Randle was found to be not competent to proceed to trial in his pending case and was ordered to the Larned State Hospital for competency restoration.

In March 2023, Randle was found to be competent to stand trial; however, this decision was reversed in November 2023. As of November 2024, Randle has yet to stand trial in his rape case.

== Personal life ==
His older brother, John, was a running back for the University of Kansas and Southern Illinois University.
