= Bentley Falcons =

Intercollegiate sports teams of Bentley University

- University: Bentley University
- Nickname: Falcons
- Association: Division II
- Conference: NE-10 (primary); AHA (men's ice hockey)
- Athletic director: Vaughn Williams
- Location: Waltham, Massachusetts
- Varsity teams: 24 (12 men's, 12 women's)
- Football stadium: Peter Yetton Field
- Ice hockey arena: Bentley Arena
- Baseball stadium: Robert DeFelice Baseball Field
- Softball stadium: Bentley University Softball Field
- Colors: Blue and white
- Mascot: Flex the Falcon
- Website: bentleyfalcons.com

The Bentley Falcons are composed of 24 teams representing Bentley University in intercollegiate athletics, including men and women's basketball, cross country, lacrosse, soccer, swimming & diving, tennis, and track and field. Men's sports include baseball, football, golf, and ice hockey. Women's sports include field hockey, softball, and volleyball. The Falcons compete in NCAA Division II and are members of the Northeast-10 Conference for all sports except the men's ice hockey team, which competes in Division I as a member of Atlantic Hockey.

== Teams ==
Men's sports	Women's sports
Baseball	Basketball
Basketball	Cross country
Cross country	Field hockey
Football	Golf
Golf	Lacrosse
Ice Hockey	Soccer
Lacrosse	Softball
Soccer	Swimming & diving
Swimming & diving	Tennis
Tennis	Track & field^{†}
Track & field^{†}	Volleyball
† – Track & Field includes both indoor and outdoor.

== History ==
Bentley's mascot is Flex the Falcon. The university has 23 men's and women's varsity teams. All of the teams compete in the Northeast-10 Conference at the NCAA Division II level, with the exception of the men's hockey program, which was one of the original six founding teams of Atlantic Hockey at the Division I level.

Bentley is also home to one of the best rugby programs in the Northeast, winning two national Division III titles as well as the 2008 Beast of the East tournament.

In 2001, the Bentley field hockey team won the NCAA Division II national championship.

In 2012, the Bentley men's cross country team finished 26th in the nation at Division II XC Nationals. Likewise in 2015, the Bentley men's cross country team qualified for the NCAA Division II Cross Country Championships and finished 30th in the nation.

After beating Saint Michael's College by a score of 85–65 on February 23, 2008, the Bentley University men's basketball team set the record for the longest regular season winning streak in Division II history. Additionally, Bentley has men's, women's, and co-ed intramural programs for the fall, winter, and spring semesters.

The Bentley women's basketball team completed the 2013–2014 season with a 35–0 record, winning the NCAA Division II National Championship. Their appearance in the 2019 NCAA Division II women's basketball tournament was their 35th in team history, having only missed just three since the first NCAA women's tournament; they have the most appearances in the history of the NCAA women's tournament.

The Bentley men's ultimate frisbee team won USA Ultimate's Division III College Championship in 2014.

The Bentley Falcons football team has made two Division II playoff appearances in back-to-back seasons in 2003 and 2004.

== National championships ==
=== Team ===
Sport	Association	Division	Year	Opponent/Runner-up	Score
Field hockey (1)	NCAA	Division II	2001	East Stroudsburg	4–2
Basketball (1)	NCAA	Division II	2014	West Texas A&M	73–65

== Notable people ==
=== Players ===
- Brian Hammel, '75, former Bentley basketball player and coach who was drafted by the Milwaukee Bucks in the third round of the 1975 NBA draft
- Andy Kupec, '83, former Bentley basketball player who was drafted by the Boston Celtics in the 10th round of the 1983 NBA draft
- Todd Orlando, '84, former Bentley basketball player who was drafted by the Boston Celtics in the 5th round of the 1984 NBA draft
- Jack Perri, '98, head coach of men's basketball at Southern New Hampshire University, previously LIU Brooklyn
- Ryan Soderquist, '00, current head coach of Bentley Falcons men's ice hockey team and all-time points and goals leader
- Mackenzy Bernadeau, '08, professional football player who was last with the Jacksonville Jaguars organization; drafted 250th overall in 2008 NFL draft by the Carolina Panthers
- Jason Westrol, '10, former Bentley basketball player who last played for the Limburg United of the Belgian Basketball League
- Lauren Battista, '14, All-American Women's Basketball Player – WBCA Division-II National Player of the Year, the Capital One Academic All-American of the Year, CWSA/Honda Division II Athlete of the Year, and an NCAA Today's Top 10 Award honoree; head women's basketball coach at Princeton University
- Max Adler, '17, lacrosse player for the Denver Outlaws of Major League Lacrosse
- Ryan Berardino, '20, drafted by the Boston Red Sox in the 34th round of the 2019 Major League Baseball draft
- Jakov Novak, '22, drafted by the Ottawa Senators in the 7th round of the 2018 NHL entry draft

=== Coaches ===
- Barbara Stevens, longtime women's basketball coach and Naismith Basketball Hall of Fame inductee
- Ryan Soderquist, '00, former head coach of Bentley Falcons men's ice hockey team and all-time points and goals leader
- Jack Perri, '98, head coach of men's basketball at Southern New Hampshire University, previously LIU Brooklyn
- Frank Sullivan, former Bentley men's basketball coach from 1984 to 1991
- Paul Cormier, former Bentley men's assistant basketball coach from 1978 to 1980
- Jim Ferry, former Bentley men's assistant basketball coach from 1991 to 1998
- Hal Kopp, Bentley football coach from 1972 to 1975
- Jack Regan, Bentley football coach from 1976 to 1978
- Peter Yetten, Bentley football coach from 1979 to 2008
- Thom Boerman, Bentley football coach from 2009 to 2013
- Robert Connors, former offensive coordinator for the Bentley football team from 1989 to 1997
- Peter Simonini, former Bentley men's soccer coach
- Bobby Shuttleworth, former Bentley men's soccer assistant coach and New England Revolution player
