= Northern Illinois Huskies men's basketball statistical leaders =

The Northern Illinois Huskies men's basketball statistical leaders are individual statistical leaders of the Northern Illinois Huskies men's basketball program in various categories, including points, assists, blocks, rebounds, and steals. Within those areas, the lists identify single-game, single-season, and career leaders. The Huskies represent Northern Illinois University in the NCAA Division I Horizon League.

Northern Illinois began competing in intercollegiate basketball in 1900. However, the school's record book does not generally list records from before the 1950s, as records from before this period are often incomplete and inconsistent. Since scoring was much lower in this era, and teams played much fewer games during a typical season, it is likely that few or no players from this era would appear on these lists anyway.

The NCAA did not officially record assists as a stat until the 1983–84 season, and blocks and steals until the 1985–86 season, but Northern Illinois's record books includes players in these stats before these seasons. These lists are updated through the end of the 2023–24 season.

== Scoring ==
Career
Rk	Player	Points	Seasons
1	Eugene German	2,203	2016–17 2017–18 2018–19 2019–20
2	T.J. Lux	1,996	1995–96 1996–97 1997–98 1998–99 1999–00
3	Donnell Thomas	1,853	1987–88 1988–89 1989–90 1990–91
4	Allen Rayhorn	1,848	1978–79 1979–80 1980–81 1981–82
5	Paul Dawkins	1,749	1975–76 1976–77 1977–78 1978–79
6	Leon Rodgers	1,657	1998–99 1999–00 2000–01 2001–02
7	Tim Dillon	1,559	1980–81 1981–82 1982–83 1983–84
8	Matt Hicks	1,513	1974–75 1975–76 1976–77
9	Levi Bradley	1,464	2015–16 2016–17 2017–18 2018–19
10	Jerry Zielinski	1,402	1969–70 1970–71 1971–72

Season
Rk	Player	Points	Season
1	Paul Dawkins	695	1978–79
2	Matt Hicks	682	1976–77
3	Eugene German	659	2017–18
4	Eugene German	634	2019–20
5	Eugene German	631	2018–19
6	Matt Hicks	625	1975–76
7	Billy Harris	603	1972–73
8	David Coit	602	2023–24
9	Leon Rodgers	596	2001–02
10	Xavier Silas	579	2010–11

Single game
Rk	Player	Points	Season	Opponent
1	Larry Wyllie	52	1957–58	Eastern Mich.
2	Larry Wyllie	48	1957–58	Hope College
3	Paul Dawkins	47	1978–79	Western Mich.
4	John Olson	46	1955–56	Eastern Mich.
	Jerry Zielinski	46	1970–71	Southern Ill.
	Matt Hicks	46	1975–76	Green Bay
7	George Bork	44	1961–62	Winona State
8	Billy Harris	42	1972–73	VCU
	Matt Hicks	42	1976–77	Kent State
10	Billy Harris	41	1972–73	Ball State
	Paul Dawkins	41	1978–79	Valparaiso

== Rebounds ==
Career
Rk	Player	Rebounds	Seasons
1	T.J. Lux	1,110	1995–96 1996–97 1997–98 1998–99 1999–00
2	Allen Rayhorn	1,077	1978–79 1979–80 1980–81 1981–82
3	Larry Gentry	990	1956–57 1957–58 1958–59 1959–60
4	Donnell Thomas	984	1987–88 1988–89 1989–90 1990–91
5	W.L. Moore	929	1962–63 1963–64 1964–65
6	Marcus Smallwood	843	2000–01 2001–02 2002–03 2003–04
7	Jim Bradley	824	1971–72 1972–73
8	Matt Hicks	804	1974–75 1975–76 1976–77
9	Paul Dawkins	782	1975–76 1976–77 1977–78 1978–79
10	John Harris	733	1975–76 1976–77 1977–78 1978–79

Season
Rk	Player	Rebounds	Season
1	Jim Bradley	426	1972–73
2	Jim Bradley	398	1971–72
3	Matt Hicks	350	1976–77
	Jim Smith	350	1968–69
5	Jim Smith	339	1967–68
6	W.L. Moore	335	1964–65
7	Abe Booker	331	1959–60
8	Ed Ware	322	1950–51
9	Allen Rayhorn	321	1980–81
10	Matt Hicks	319	1975–76

Single game
Rk	Player	Rebounds	Season	Opponent
1	Abe Booker	32	1959–60	Eastern Mich.
2	Jim Bradley	31	1972–73	UW-Milwaukee
3	Jim Bradley	29	1971–72	Ball State
4	Jim Bradley	24	1972–73	CSU-Los Angeles
5	Matt Hicks	23	1975–76	Eastern Mich.
	Jim Bradley	23	1972–73	Buffalo
7	Jim Bradley	22	1971–72	Southern Ill.
	Jim Bradley	22	1972–73	San Francisco St.
	Jim Bradley	22	1972–73	Central Mich.

== Assists ==
Career
Rk	Player	Assists	Seasons
1	Jay Bryant	367	1976–77 1977–78 1978–79 1979–80
2	Travon Baker	357	2012–13 2013–14 2014–15 2015–16
3	Ronald Minter	353	1993–94 1994–95 1995–96 1996–97
4	Rodney Davis	332	1984–85 1985–86 1986–87 1987–88
5	Donte Parker	330	1994–95 1995–96 1996–97 1997–98
6	Kaleb Thornton	326	2020–21 2021–22 2022–23
7	Anthony Maestranzi	323	2002–03 2003–04 2004–05 2005–06
8	Jerry Williams	317	1983–84 1984–85 1985–86 1986–87
9	Donald Whiteside	313	1987–88 1988–89 1989–90 1990–91
10	Mike Lipnisky	310	1990–91 1991–92 1992–93 1993–94 1994–95

Season
Rk	Player	Assists	Season
1	Jay Bryant	163	1979–80
2	Kaleb Thornton	159	2022–23
3	Cory Sims	133	2004–05
	Ronald Minter	133	1995–96
5	Cory Sims	127	2005–06
	Travon Baker	127	2015–16
7	Rodney Davis	126	1987–88
8	Kaleb Thornton	117	2021–22
9	Gianni Cobb	116	2025–26
10	Carl Armato	115	1983–84
	Carl Armato	115	1982–83

Single game
Rk	Player	Assists	Season	Opponent
1	Ray Clark	13	1978–79	Bowling Green
2	Jim Bradley	12	1972–73	Wichita State
	Jim Bradley	12	1972–73	Ball State
	Carl Armato	12	1982–83	Toledo
	Donte Parker	12	1994–95	Illinois-Chicago
	Ephraim Eaddy	12	1998–99	Chicago State

== Steals ==
Career
Rk	Player	Steals	Seasons
1	Travon Baker	184	2012–13 2013–14 2014–15 2015–16
2	Ronald Minter	163	1993–94 1994–95 1995–96 1996–97
3	Aaric Armstead	153	2013–14 2014–15 2015–16 2016–17
4	Vaurice Patterson	135	1991–92 1992–93 1994–95 1995–96
5	P.J. Smith	133	2001–02 2002–03 2003–04
6	Donald Whiteside	131	1987–88 1988–89 1989–90 1990–91
7	T.J. Lux	130	1995–96 1996–97 1997–98 1998–99 1999–00
8	Kenny Battle	127	1984–85 1985–86
9	Mike Lipnisky	120	1990–91 1991–92 1992–93 1993–94 1994–95
10	Rodney Davis	117	1984–85 1985–86 1986–87 1987–88
	Trendon Hankerson	117	2018–19 2019–20 2020–21 2021–22

Season
Rk	Player	Steals	Season
1	Kenny Battle	67	1985–86
2	Eugene Bates	62	2002–03
3	Kenny Battle	60	1984–85
4	Ronald Minter	55	1995–96
	Donald Whiteside	55	1988–89
6	Eugene Bates	54	2001–02
	Trendon Hankerson	54	2021–22
8	P.J. Smith	53	2001–02
9	Mike Lipnisky	52	1994–95
10	P.J. Smith	51	2002–03
	Kaleb Thornton	51	2022–23
	Gianni Cobb	51	2025–26

Single game
Rk	Player	Steals	Season	Opponent
1	Travon Baker	9	2015–16	Chicago State
2	Aaron Armstead	8	2014–15	Hampton
3	Kenny Battle	7	1984–85	Fairfield
	Ronald Minter	7	1995–96	Cleveland State

== Blocks ==
Career
Rk	Player	Blocks	Seasons
1	James Hughes	210	2003–04 2004–05 2005–06 2006–07
2	T.J. Lux	156	1995–96 1996–97 1997–98 1998–99 1999–00
3	Marcus Smallwood	145	2000–01 2001–02 2002–03 2003–04
4	Hubert Register	134	1991–92 1992–93 1993–94 1994–95
5	Andrew Wells	89	1987–88 1988–89 1989–90 1990–91
6	Steve Oldendorf	80	1990–91 1991–92 1992–93 1993–94
7	Antwon Harmon	68	1988–89 1989–90 1990–91
8	Yanic Konan Niederhäuser	67	2022–23 2023–24
9	Matt Nelson	65	1998–99 1999–2000 2000–01 2001–02
	Marin Marić	65	2013–14 2014–15 2015–16 2016–17

Season
Rk	Player	Blocks	Season
1	James Hughes	64	2006–07
	Hubert Register	64	1994–95
3	Yanic Konan Niederhäuser	57	2023–24
4	James Hughes	53	2003–04
	James Hughes	53	2004–05
6	Steve Oldendorf	43	1991–92
7	Marcus Smallwood	42	2002–03
	Hubert Register	42	1993–94
9	Marcus Smallwood	40	2001–02
	James Hughes	40	2005–06

Single game
Rk	Player	Blocks	Season	Opponent
1	Andrew Wells	7	1990–91	Western Illinois
	Marcus Smallwood	7	2001–02	Miami (OH)
3	James Hughes	6	Five Times	
	Marin Marić	6	2015–16	Western Michigan
