= 1996 Midwestern Collegiate Conference men's basketball tournament =

- Classification: Division I
- Season: 1995–96
- Teams: 8
- Site: Nutter Center; Dayton, Ohio
- Champions: Northern Illinois
- Winning coach: Brian Hammel
- MVP: Chris Coleman (Northern Illinois)

1995–96 Midwestern Collegiate Conference men's basketball standings
	Conf.				Overall
Team	W		L	PCT	W		L	PCT
Green Bay	16	–	0	1.000	25	–	4	.862
Butler	12	–	4	.750	19	–	8	.704
Northern Illinois †	12	–	4	.750	19	–	8	.704
Wright State	8	–	8	.500	14	–	13	.519
Detroit	8	–	8	.500	18	–	11	.621
Milwaukee	5	–	11	.313	9	–	18	.333
UIC	5	–	11	.313	10	–	18	.357
Loyola (IL)	5	–	11	.313	8	–	19	.296
Cleveland State	3	–	13	.188	5	–	21	.192
† 1996 MCC tournament winner As of March 5, 1996; Rankings from AP poll

The 1996 Midwestern Collegiate Conference men's basketball tournament took place at the end of the 1995–96 regular season. The tournament was hosted by Wright State.

== Seeds ==
All Midwestern Collegiate Conference schools played in the tournament. Teams were seeded by 1995–96 Midwestern Collegiate Conference season record, with a tiebreaker system to seed teams with identical conference records.

== Bracket ==
Quarterfinals
1	#24 WI-Green Bay	58
8	Loyola	48
4	Wright State	61
5	Detroit	67
2	Butler	97
7	UIC	107
3	Northern Illinois	80
6	WI-Milwaukee	60

Semifinals
1	#24 WI-Green Bay	50
5	Detroit	56
7	Illinois Chicago	60
3	Northern Illinois	95

Championship
5	Detroit	63
3	Northern Illinois	84
