= Boerman =

Boerman is a Dutch surname. Notable people with the surname include:

- Coen Boerman (born 1976), Dutch cyclist
- Jan Boerman (1923–2020), Dutch composer
- Thom Boerman (born 1952 or 1953), American football coach

== See also ==
- Emma Boermans (born 1999), German field hockey player
