= 1995–96 Wright State Raiders men's basketball team =

American college basketball season

1995–96 Wright State Raiders men's basketball
- Conference: MCC
- Record: 14-13 (8-8 MCC)
- Head coach: Ralph Underhill (18th season)
- Assistant coaches: Jim Brown; Jim Ehler; Jack Butler
- Home arena: Nutter Center

1995–96 Midwestern Collegiate Conference men's basketball standings
	Conf.				Overall
Team	W		L	PCT	W		L	PCT
Green Bay	16	–	0	1.000	25	–	4	.862
Butler	12	–	4	.750	19	–	8	.704
Northern Illinois †	12	–	4	.750	19	–	8	.704
Wright State	8	–	8	.500	14	–	13	.519
Detroit	8	–	8	.500	18	–	11	.621
Milwaukee	5	–	11	.313	9	–	18	.333
UIC	5	–	11	.313	10	–	18	.357
Loyola (IL)	5	–	11	.313	8	–	19	.296
Cleveland State	3	–	13	.188	5	–	21	.192
† 1996 MCC tournament winner As of March 5, 1996; Rankings from AP poll

The 1995–96 Wright State Raiders men's basketball team represented Wright State University in the 1995–96 NCAA NCAA Division I men's basketball season led by head coach Ralph Underhill.

== Season summary ==
The second season in the Midwestern Collegiate Conference was also the second with future first-round NBA selection Vitaly Potapenko. It was a season of heightened expectations followed by competitive but often disappointing results. After an encouraging non-conference season, the MCC season began 0–4. The Raiders fought back and finished the season 8–4 to earn a 4th seed in the tournament, which they hosted. An early exit to 5th-seeded Detroit Mercy seemed a fitting end to a good season, yet one with missed opportunities.

== The Season Behind the Season ==
When Wright State moved up to Division I, men’s basketball was competitive on the floor from the start, and remained so in 1995-96. Off the floor, the program was not yet at the Division I level. They lacked a full time strength coach. They lacked a full time academic advisor, which resulted in losing athletes to academic issues. One secretary was supporting several athletic teams. The head coach didn’t have a multi-year contract. It wasn’t a lack of commitment to sports, but rather that the school was slow to shift fully from what had been a strong Division II program to the support required in Division I.

Even before the previous season had ended following their upset of Xavier in the MCC tournament, the local media had begun calling for head coach Ralph Underhill to be awarded an extended contract. Reporters argued that the highly successful coach was undercompensated compared to neighboring Division I head coaches. In response to this Mike Cusack began negotiations for what was expected to be a three-year contract deal.

The offseason had the ups and downs of college athletics. Star center Vitaly Potapenko was coming back and expected to play two more seasons. New recruit Keion Brooks and junior college transfer Johnnie Blake were cause for excitement. But on the down side Rob Welsh broke his ankle, Jason Smith was lost due to academic issues and Blake hadn’t joined the team at the start of the season. Potapenko, who was apparently a good student maintaining a “B” average, had yet to pass the required English as a second language exam as required by the University. His English language skills were noticeably a work in progress.

The most profound change, however, was the new university president, Dr. Harley Flack. Flack was a polymath with a quiet, academic demeanor. He was also described as having a "strong capacity for moral indignation." The new boss couldn’t have posed a more profound contrast to the passionate head coach. Their apparent feud would play out in the press and alter the trajectory of Wright State basketball.

Underhill routinely scheduled top-tier programs, and always coached like he expected to win. He was known to ride the referees, and notably when hosting Wisconsin in December 1995 he earned a technical foul that helped secure Wisconsin’s comeback win. For this he was soundly criticized in the local media. Just four days later, Underhill found himself at cross-town rival University of Dayton with his star center Vitaly Poptapenko running a fever and playing like it. The frustration of the day got the best of the veteran coach and he earned two technical fouls, which is an automatic ejection from the game.

President Dr. Harley Flack was embarrassed by these events. First he suspended the talk of a new three-year contract, details of which were already appearing in the press. He then demanded that Coach Underhill be put on notice that further technical fouls would lead to suspension and any additional ejections to termination. Dr. Flack also stopped going to the basketball games as a public rebuke of his coach, explaining that coaches must be “worthy ambassadors of Wright State.” In a statement to the press, Dr. Flack outlined his subjective four-point plan for evaluating Underhill after the season: Building athlete character and citizenship, academic achievement, coach’s character, won loss record.

Athletic Director Mike Cusack prevailed upon the president to rescind the probationary status after just six games, pointing out that Underhill and only been ejected once before in 17 years. Flack announced that contract talks would then be suspended until the off season. Guard Rick Martinez quit the team about the same time, adding further stress to the team and staff.

After pressure came from the university board of directors Flack eventually permitted Cusack and Underhill to resume contract negotiations. A two year contract was agreed to on February 9 and signed by Flack on February 12. The team celebrated by upsetting Butler at Hinkle Fieldhouse that evening.

== Roster ==
1995–96 Wright State Raiders men's basketball team
Players
Coaches

Pos.	#	Name	Height	Weight	Year	Previous school	Hometown
F	32	Delme Herriman	6 ft 7 in (2.01 m)	220 lb (100 kg)	RS Sr	Claymont	Manchester, England
F	41	Bilaal Neal	6 ft 6 in (1.98 m)	205 lb (93 kg)	Sr	Westark JC	Warren, AR
G	20	Rob Welch (redshirt)	6 ft 2 in (1.88 m)	170 lb (77 kg)	Jr	Wayne Trace	Haviland, OH
G	22	Rick Martinez	6 ft 1 in (1.85 m)	180 lb (82 kg)	Jr	Ambassador Christian	Fontana, CA
G	23	Eric Ramsey (redshirt)	6 ft 1 in (1.85 m)	185 lb (84 kg)	Jr	Carroll	Dayton, OH
G	30	Terrance Cast	5 ft 6 in (1.68 m)	150 lb (68 kg)	Jr	Lake Land JC	Gary, IN
F	40	Mike Conner	6 ft 7 in (2.01 m)	225 lb (102 kg)	Jr	Malden	Boston, MA
F/C	52	Vitaly Potapenko	6 ft 10 in (2.08 m)	310 lb (141 kg)	Jr	Kiev State University of Physical Culture	Kiev, Ukraine
G	24	Derek Watkins	6 ft 0 in (1.83 m)	165 lb (75 kg)	So	Valley View	Germantown, OH
F	33	Antuan Johnson	6 ft 6 in (1.98 m)	200 lb (91 kg)	So	Scott	Toledo, OH
F	43	Thad Burton	6 ft 10 in (2.08 m)	240 lb (109 kg)	So	St. Charles Prep	Columbus, OH
F	44	Steno Kos	6 ft 11 in (2.11 m)	220 lb (100 kg)	So	St. Catherine JC	Klosterneuburg
G	1	Keion Brooks	6 ft 3 in (1.91 m)	160 lb (73 kg)	Fr	North Side	Ft. Wayne, IN
F	31	Anthony Brown	6 ft 4 in (1.93 m)	210 lb (95 kg)	Fr	Beavercreek	Beavercreek, OH

Head coach

- Ralph Underhill

Assistant coach(es)

Jim Brown, Jim Ehler, Jack Butler

Legend

- (C) Team captain
- (S) Suspended
- (I) Ineligible
- (W) Walk-on
- Injured
- Current redshirt

== Schedule and results ==
Date time, TV	Rank^{#}	Opponent^{#}	Result	Record	Site city, state
Nov 25, 1995*		Wilmington	W 102-53	1–0	Nutter Center; Fairborn, OH
Dec 2, 1995*		Eastern Kentucky	W 76-64	2-0	Nutter Center; Fairborn, OH
Dec 5, 1995*		Wisconsin	L 91-94	2–1	Nutter Center (8,032); Fairborn, OH
Dec 9, 1995*		at Dayton; Gem City Jam	L 80-98	2-2	UD Arena; Dayton, OH
Dec 12, 1995*		Ohio	W 88-77	3–2	Nutter Center; Fairborn, OH
Dec 16, 1995		at Toledo	W 62-57	4–2	Centennial Hall; Toledo, OH
Dec 19, 1995*		Youngstown State	W 74-66	5-2	Nutter Center; Fairborn, OH
Dec 23, 1995*		Manhattan	W 85-76	6–2	Nutter Center; Fairborn, OH
Dec 27, 1995		at Miami (OH)	L 86-105	6–3	Millett Assembly Hall; Oxford, OH
Dec 31, 1995*		vs. No. 21 Virginia Tech	L 46-62	6-4	Lakefront Arena; New Orleans, LA
Jan 3, 1996		at Green Bay	L 52-78	6-5 (0–1)	Brown County Veterans Memorial Arena; Green Bay, WI
Jan 4, 1996		at UIC	L 79-91	6-6 (0–2)	UIC Pavilion; Chicago, IL
Jan 11, 1996		Butler	L 68-71	6–7 (0–3)	Nutter Center; Fairborn, OH
Jan 13, 1996		at Cleveland State	L 68-83	6-8 (0–4)	CSU Convocation Center; Cleveland, OH
Jan 15, 1996		Loyola	W 87-73	7-8 (1–4)	Nutter Center; Fairborn, OH
Jan 20, 1996		at Milwaukee	W 74-71	8-8 (2–4)	Baker Fieldhouse; Milwaukee, WI
Jan 22, 1996		at Detroit Mercy	W 59–57	9-8 (3–4)	Calihan Hall; Detroit, MI
Jan 29, 1996		Northern Illinois	L 63-71	9-9 (3–5)	Nutter Center; Fairborn, OH
Feb 1, 1996		UIC	W 91-74	10-9 (4–5)	Nutter Center; Fairborn, OH
Feb 3, 1996		Green Bay	L 53-60	10-10 (4–6)	Nutter Center; Fairborn, OH
Feb 10, 1996		at Loyola	L 67-85	10-11 (4–7)	Alumni Gym; Chicago, IL
Feb 12, 1996		at Butler	W 67-61	11-11 (5–7)	Hinkle Fieldhouse; Indianapolis, IN
Feb 14, 1996		Cleveland State	W 65-54	12-11 (6–7)	Nutter Center; Fairborn, OH
Feb 17, 1996		Detroit Mercy	W 70–63	13-11 (7–7)	Nutter Center; Fairborn, OH
Feb 22, 1996		Milwaukee	W 99-75	14-11 (8–7)	Nutter Center; Fairborn, OH
Feb 24, 1996		at Northern Illinois	L 71-81	14-12 (8–8)	Chick Evans Field House; DeKalb, IL
Midwestern Collegiate Tournament
Mar 2, 1996	(4)	(5) Detroit Mercy; First Round	L 61-67	14-13	Nutter Center; Fairborn, OH
*Non-conference game. ^{#}Rankings from AP Poll. (#) Tournament seedings in parentheses. MW=Midwest.

== Awards and honors ==
Vitaly Potapenko	MVP
Delme Herriman	Raider Award
Vitaly Potapenko	First Team MCC
Keion Brooks	MCC All Newcomer

== Statistics ==
Number	Name	Games	Average	Points	Assists	Rebounds
52	Vitaly Potapenko	26	20.7	538	36	193
21	Keion Brooks	27	12.4	335	92	87
32	Delme Herriman	27	9.3	252	73	165
40	Mike Conner	27	6.1	164	14	76
30	Terrance Cast	26	6.2	161	58	55
33	Antuan Johnson	19	7.3	138	17	87
20	Rob Welch	20	6.6	132	56	53
44	Steno Kos	27	3.4	92	14	70
22	Rick Martinez	15	3.9	59	39	26
43	Thad Burton	23	2.3	52	3	43
41	Bilaal Neal	11	4.4	48	2	22
24	Derek Watkins	21	0.5	11	6	7
31	Anthony Brown	14	0.1	2	2	7
