= College National Fed Challenge =

Academic competition

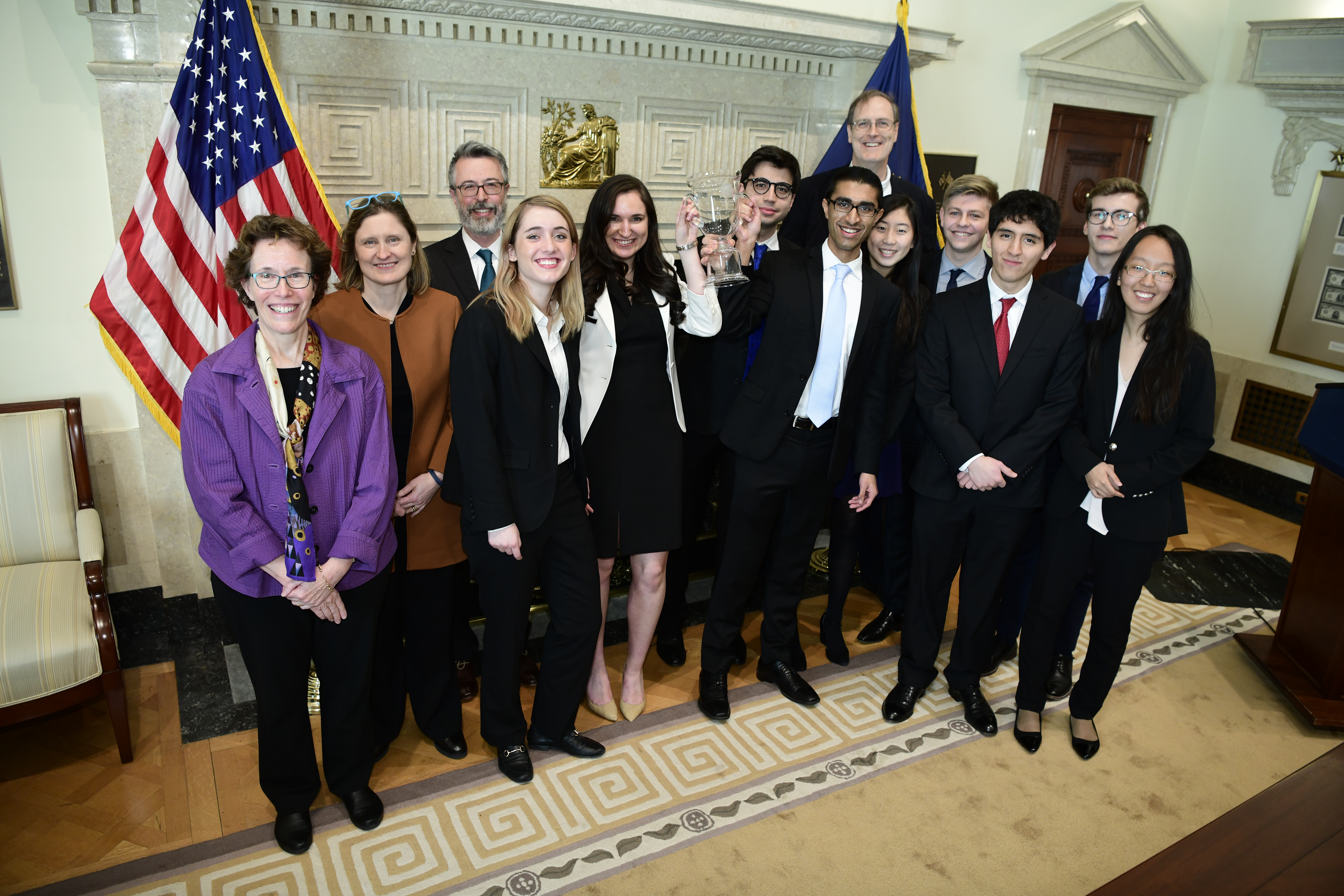
2018 Champions, Yale University, at the Federal Reserve

The College National Fed Challenge is an annual team competition for undergraduate college students inspired by the working of the Federal Open Market Committee. The competition is intended to encourage students to learn more about the U.S. macro economy, the Federal Reserve System, and the implementation of monetary policy. The College Fed Challenge also aims at promoting interest in economics and finance as subjects for advanced study and as the basis for a career.

== Purpose ==
In addition to the educational benefits and confidence arising through the competition, students benefit from opportunities to apply their economic experiences in the real world. These skills learned can be applied to acquire internships, discover potential career paths, and hone skills of public speaking, logical thinking, writing, and analysis. Instructors of undergraduate institutions benefit through the use of a venue to develop enthusiasm for the study of economics and to integrate their curriculum with an active learning experience. Goals of the challenge include:

- To develop an understanding of the components of a modern economy and their long-term contribution to economic growth and development, while appreciating the short-run fluctuations which lead to business cycle activity.
- To comprehend the role of the Federal Reserve System in creating monetary policy designed to promote economic stabilization in furtherance of achieving the dual mandate of price level stability and maximum employment while assuring moderate long-term interest rates and financial system stability.
- To understand the short-run and long-run interactions of monetary policy with regard to unemployment, inflation, economic growth, fiscal policy, and exchange rate stability.
- To promote an understanding of current political and economic issues which impact on overall economic and financial system activity.
- To increase students' awareness and understanding of the unique role of the Federal Reserve in the economy.
- To develop students' research, cooperation, presentation, and critical thinking skills.

== Format ==
Teams of three to five students per college team present current macroeconomic and financial information to a panel compiled of professional economists, bankers, financial analysts, and academics. Each team is afforded 15 minutes to analyze and present various macroeconomic theories which if implemented, could lead to economic prosperity. At the end of the 15-minute presentation the team must formulate a monetary plan for the Federal Reserve Bank to implement. A 15-minute question and answer session involving the presenting team and the panel follows the 15-minute presentation. Panel members quiz the students on current events, economic definitions, and macroeconomic policy during the 15-minute session.

Teams compete in two rounds at the regional competition which takes place at a nearby Federal Reserve Bank. Winners of the regional competition advance to the final round in the national competition, held in Washington, D.C.

== Scoring ==
The panel of judges score each team after the 15-minute question and answer session. A maximum of 50 points are awarded accordingly. Judges use a scoring rubric which analyzes the team's "Knowledge of the Fed, current state of the economy, and monetary policy", "Responses to Judges questions", "Quality of the presentation", "Research and analysis", and "Teamwork and cooperation".

== Participating Federal Reserve Banks ==
The following Federal Reserve Banks participate in the College Fed Challenge:

- New York, NY
- Chicago, IL
- Washington, D.C.
- Richmond, VA
- Boston, MA
- Philadelphia, PA

== National Champions ==
2025 Pace University: Suraj Sharma, Giancarlo Raspanti, Brooklyn Bynum, Gianna Beck, and Alex Tuosto

2024 Princeton University: Bracklinn Williams, Daniel Sozanski, Eleanor Clemans-Cope, Elliot Lee, William Neumann

2023 Harvard University: Hyuntae Choi, Sam Meacham, Ben Workman, Megan Yeo, and Dora Ivkovich
2022 Princeton University: Lauren Fahlberg, Noah Harrigan, Shivani Prusty, Shirley (Yilin) Ren, and Richard Zhu
2021 Pace University: Yuwei Liu, Fiona Waterman, Christopher Beck, Casey Cloutier, Kate Fong
2020 Dartmouth College: Ayan Agarwal, Tench Coxe, Utsav Jalan, Kira Koehler, Zack Olson
2019 Pace University: Scarlett Bekus, Joseph Drennan, Sean Freda, Marissa Kleinbauer, and Dylan Seals
2018 Yale University: Ramiz Colak, Sienna Gough, Rohit Goyal, David Rubio, and Lydia Wickard
2017 Pace University: Klejdja Qosja, Marina Testani, Salil Ahuja, Scarlett Bekus, and Carly Aznavorian
2016 Rutgers University - New Brunswick: Karn Dalal, Ali Haider Ismail, Andrew Lee, Shivram Viswanathan, and Ashton W. Welles
2015 Pace University: Daniella Gambino, Katherine Craig, Omar Habib, Yuliya Palianok, and Melissa Navas
2014 Pace University: Lauren Price, Yulia Mikhailova, Kelsey Berro, Katherine Craig, and Jordan Jhamb
2013 Harvard University: Andreas Schaab, Eugene Wang, Samuel Young, Justin Katiraei, and Daniel Tartakovsky
2012 Northwestern: David Chen, Eric Zhang, Jonathan Cohen, Geoffrey Bery, and Nikhil Byanna
2011 Harvard University: Sumit Malik, Anirudha Balasubramanian, James Sun, Benjamin Sprung-Keyser, and Andreas Schaab
2010 Bentley: David Norrish, Pranay Jain, Christina Harstad, Peter Jurik, and Satyajeet Jadhavrao
2009 Lafayette: Teevrat Garg, Dan Stefan, Dylan McNamara, and Nick Stacey
2008 Harvard University: Troy Murrell, Colin Motley, Akeel Rangwala, William Schaub, and Anna Zhang
2007 Harvard University: Troy Murrell, Colin Motley, Akeel Rangwala, William Schaub, and Scott Vautour
2006 Northwestern: Joshua Plavner, Rosa Li, Jeanne Ruan, Frederick Herrmann, and Joshua Goldstein
2005 Northwestern: Aditya Damani, Derek Moeller, Jeanne Ruan, Kevin Rodrigues, and Reed Van Gorden
2004 Northwestern: Aditya Damani, Derek Moeller, Alexander Leung, Rosa Li, and Josh Plavner

== See also ==
- National Fed Challenge
- Federal Reserve Bank
- Federal Reserve System
- Federal Reserve Bank of Boston
- Federal Open Market Committee
