= 1995–96 Northern Illinois Huskies men's basketball team =

American college basketball season

1995–96 Northern Illinois Huskies men's basketball

MCC tournament champions

NCAA Tournament East Region #14 Seed, first round
- Conference: Midwestern Collegiate Conference
- Record: 20–10 (10–6 MCC)
- Head coach: Brian Hammel
- Home arena: Chick Evans Field House

1995–96 Midwestern Collegiate Conference men's basketball standings
	Conf.				Overall
Team	W		L	PCT	W		L	PCT
Green Bay	16	–	0	1.000	25	–	4	.862
Butler	12	–	4	.750	19	–	8	.704
Northern Illinois †	12	–	4	.750	19	–	8	.704
Wright State	8	–	8	.500	14	–	13	.519
Detroit	8	–	8	.500	18	–	11	.621
Milwaukee	5	–	11	.313	9	–	18	.333
UIC	5	–	11	.313	10	–	18	.357
Loyola (IL)	5	–	11	.313	8	–	19	.296
Cleveland State	3	–	13	.188	5	–	21	.192
† 1996 MCC tournament winner As of March 5, 1996; Rankings from AP poll

The 1995–96 Northern Illinois Huskies men's basketball team represented Northern Illinois University in the college basketball season of 1995–96. The team, led by head coached by Brian Hammel, were members of the Midwestern Collegiate Conference and played their homes game at the Chick Evans Field House.

They finished the season 20–10, 10–6 in MCC play; won the 1996 MCC men's basketball tournament and lost in the first round of the 1996 NCAA tournament.

== Roster ==
1995–96 Northern Illinois Huskies men's basketball team
Players
Coaches

Pos.	#	Name	Height	Weight	Year	Hometown
		Dwayne Austin	—	—
	30	Tywon Burnom	—	—
G	25	Chris Coleman	6 ft 3 in (1.91 m)	202 lb (92 kg)	Jr
	13	Thomas Cook	—	—
F	41	Mike Hartke	6 ft 8 in (2.03 m)	277 lb (126 kg)	Jr
	31	Mark Holland	—	—
C	35	T.J. Lux	6 ft 8 in (2.03 m)	201 lb (91 kg)	Fr
G	5	Ronald Minter	5 ft 9 in (1.75 m)	158 lb (72 kg)	Jr
	10	Donte Parker	—	—
	55	James Patterson	—	—
G	24	Vaurice Patterson	6 ft 0 in (1.83 m)	171 lb (78 kg)	Sr
	4	Jamal Robinson	—	—
	44	Pete Rohlwing	—	—
	3	Marlin Simms	—	—

Head coach

- Brian Hammel

Assistant coach(es)

- Ryan Marks
- Jeff Strohm
- Benjy Taylor

Legend

- (C) Team captain
- (S) Suspended
- (I) Ineligible
- (W) Walk-on
- Injured
- Current redshirt
