= National Fed Challenge =

Academic competition

The National Fed Challenge is an academic competition that provides high school students (grades 9-12) with an insider's view of how the United States central bank, the Federal Reserve, makes monetary policy.

The Fed Challenge begins with regional and district rounds of competition. Each Fed Challenge team, consisting of three to five students, presents an analysis of the current state of the economy backed by current economic data and a monetary policy recommendation for the Federal Open Market Committee (FOMC). Following the presentation, judges question each team about their presentation and their knowledge of macroeconomic theory. Federal Reserve Bank economists and officers judge the district competitions.

One Fed Challenge team from each of the four participating Federal Reserve Districts competes at the national competition in Washington, D.C. FOMC members — Federal Reserve Governors and Reserve Bank Presidents — judge the national finals.

The competition was created in 1994 by Lloyd Bromberg, the Director of Education Programs at the New York Fed.

Since its peak in 1998 with ten district participants, the Federal Reserve Challenge participation has shrunk to three district participants (as of 2010). In 2009, the National Finals consisted of Choate Rosemary Hall (Boston District), Brebuef Jesuit Preparatory Academy (Chicago District), Montclair High School (New York District), and Collegiate School (Richmond District).

== Previous Fed Challenge National Champions ==
- 2010, St. Joseph's High School, South Bend, Indiana
- 2009, Choate Rosemary Hall, Wallingford, Connecticut
- 2008, Little Rock Central High School, Little Rock, Arkansas
- 2007, Little Rock Central High School, Little Rock, Arkansas
- 2006, Severn School, Maryland
- 2005, Pittsford Mendon High School, New York
- 2004, Rumson-Fair Haven Regional High School, New Jersey
- 2003, Severn School, Maryland
- 2002, Maggie L. Walker Governor's School for Government and International Studies, Virginia
- 2001, Montclair High School, New Jersey
- 2000, Midland High School, Texas
- 1999, University School of Milwaukee, Wisconsin
- 1998, Bryan High School, Texas
- 1997, Bryan High School, Texas
- 1996, Bryan High School, Texas

== See also ==
- College National Fed Challenge
