= Bentley University =

Private university in Waltham, Massachusetts, US

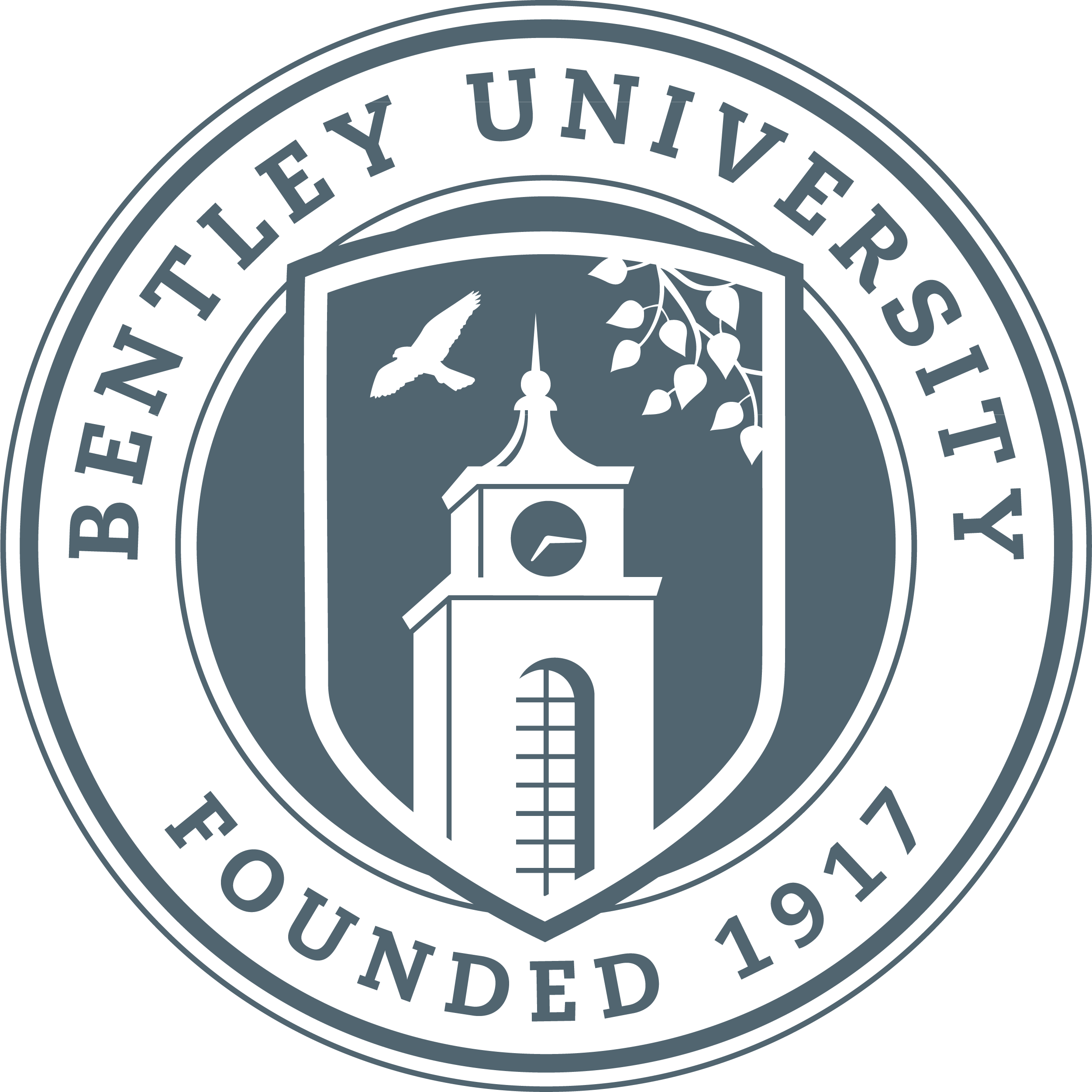
- Former names: Bentley School of Accounting and Finance (1917–1961); Bentley College of Accounting and Finance (1961–1971); Bentley College (1971–2008)
- Type: Private university
- Established: 1917; 109 years ago
- Endowment: $390.4 million (2025)
- President: E. LaBrent Chrite
- Faculty: 295 full-time, 217 part-time
- Students: 5,333 (fall 2024)
- Undergraduates: 4,526 (fall 2024)
- Postgraduates: 807 (fall 2024)
- Location: Waltham, Massachusetts, U.S. 42.3876°N 71.2206°W
- Campus: Suburban, 163 acres (66 ha)
- Colors
- Nickname: Falcons
- Sporting affiliations: NCAA Division II – Northeast-10 Conference; NCAA Division I – Atlantic Hockey America (men's ice hockey); NEISA (sailing)
- Mascot: Flex the Falcon
- Website: www.bentley.edu
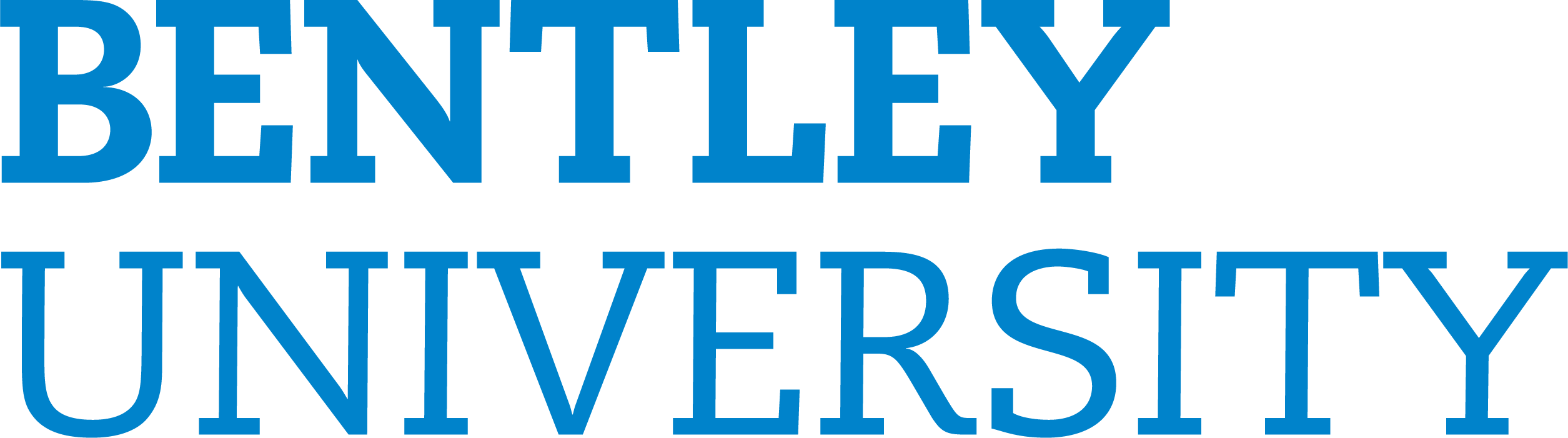

Bentley University is a private university in Waltham, Massachusetts, United States. It was founded in 1917 as a school of accounting and finance in Boston's Back Bay neighborhood. The university specializes in business education while offering undergraduate programs in the arts, humanities, social sciences, and natural and applied sciences. Its academic offerings include Bachelor of Science and Bachelor of Arts degrees, master's degree programs, an MBA, and doctoral programs.

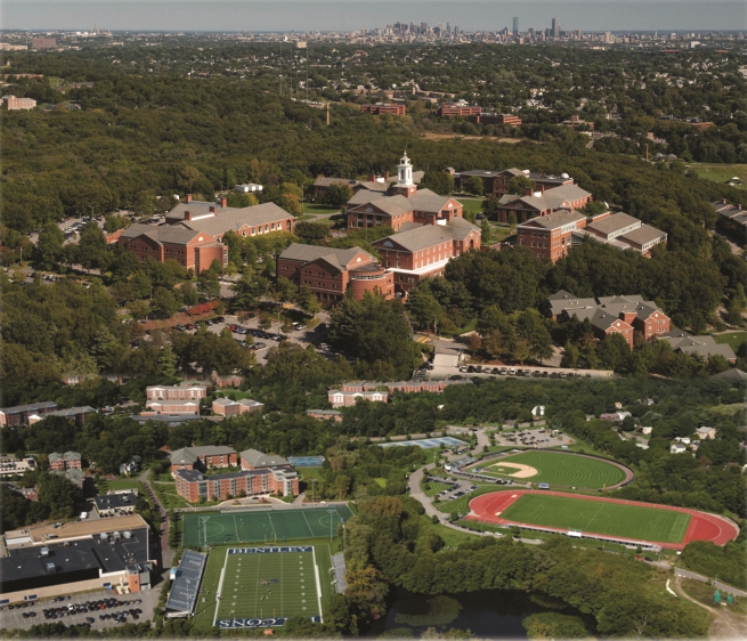
Aerial view of Bentley University's campus in Waltham, Massachusetts.

The university enrolled 5,333 students in fall 2024, including 4,526 undergraduates and 807 graduate students.

Bentley's main campus contains most of the university's academic, administrative, and student facilities. The university also maintains a North Campus approximately one mile from its main campus, with four residential buildings.

== History ==
Bentley University was founded in 1917 as the Bentley School of Accounting and Finance by Harry C. Bentley, following his departure from a professorship at the College of Business Administration at Boston University in late 1916. Thirty students attended Bentley's first class on February 26, 1917, in a room secured by Bentley at 30 Huntington Avenue in Boston.

For the 1920–1921 school year, Bentley leased and renovated several floors at 921 Boylston Street to accommodate an expanding student population. The building later became home to the admissions office of Berklee College of Music. Although the school operated in several buildings throughout Boston, the Boylston Street location became the center of its campus.

During the Great Depression, Bentley maintained a relatively stable student population, with a small decline during the middle of the 1930s. Between 1937 and 1941, as enrollment increased, the school rented and renovated additional space at 325 Newbury Street.

During World War II, Bentley's enrollment declined from a peak of 3,084 students in the 1938–1939 academic year to 1,055 in 1944–1945. The school began admitting women again in 1942, and more than 1,000 women attended Bentley between 1942 and 1946. Although the school had previously admitted women during World War I, coeducation became a permanent feature of the institution during World War II.

In 1948, the Bentley School of Accounting and Finance was incorporated as a nonprofit organization, and Harry Bentley transferred his ownership interests in the school to the nonprofit. A 27-member board of trustees was established to oversee the institution. All of the original trustees except Bentley were alumni.

In 1953, Harry Bentley stepped down as president and became president emeritus. Maurice Monroe Lindsay, who had taught at Bentley since the 1920s, succeeded him as the institution's second president.

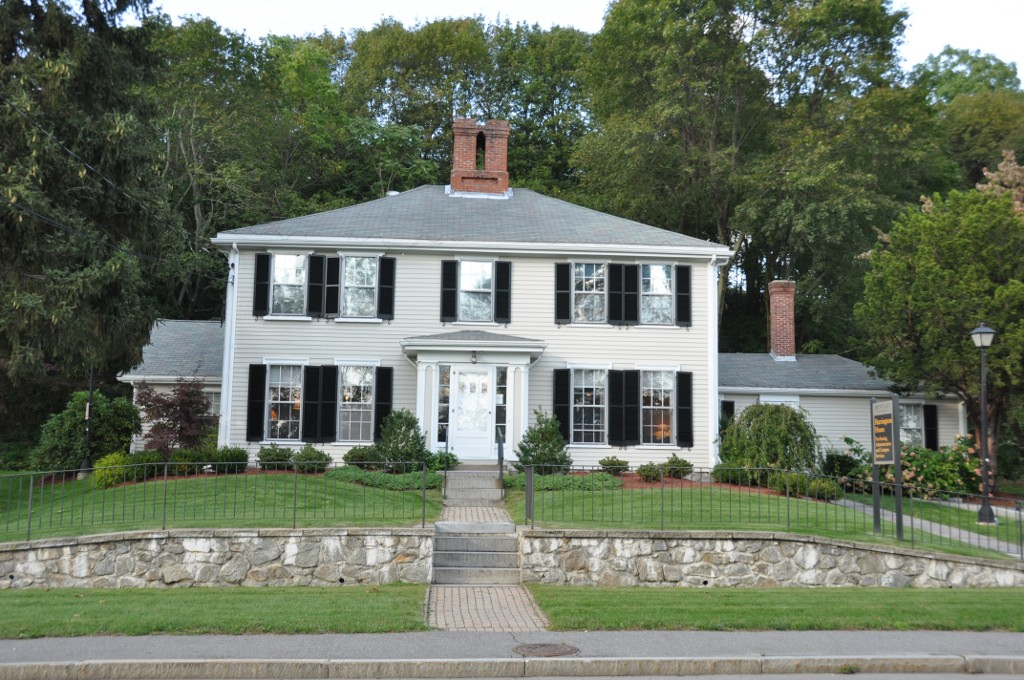
The historic Jonathan Hammond House, built in 1785 and located on Bentley University's Waltham campus.

In 1961, Bentley received authorization to confer four-year Bachelor of Science degrees. Under president Thomas Lincoln Morison, the college relocated from its Boylston Street facilities in Boston to its present location in Waltham, Massachusetts. Land for the new campus was purchased from the Lyman Estate in 1962, and construction took place from 1963 to 1968.

The Waltham campus includes the Jonathan Hammond House, a historic residence constructed in 1785. The building was listed on the National Register of Historic Places in 1989.

Gregory H. Adamian became Bentley's fourth president in 1970. During his presidency, the college received authorization to confer Bachelor of Arts degrees in 1971 and graduate degrees in 1973. The institution also adopted the name Bentley College.

In 2002, Bentley College opened a campus in Bahrain in partnership with the Bahrain Institute of Banking and Finance. In 2005, the college received authorization to award its first doctoral degrees in business and accountancy.

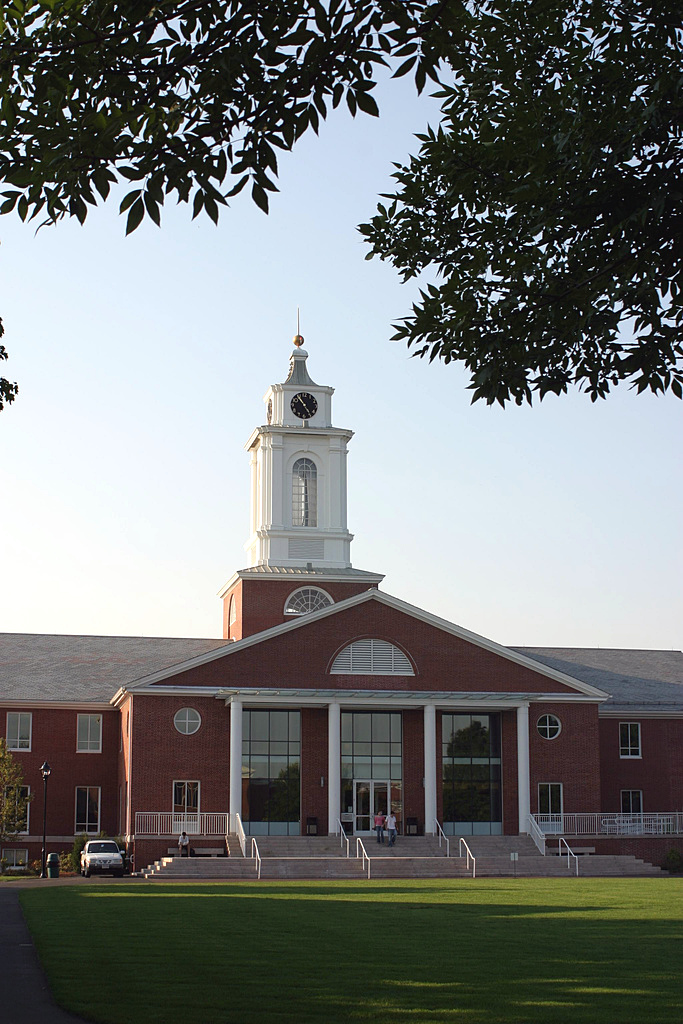
Bentley's Baker Library, photographed from Adamian in 2007.

The Bentley Library underwent a major renovation in 2006. The college also adopted a redesigned logo featuring the library's clock tower.

In 2007, Gloria Cordes Larson, a former state and federal government official and Boston-based attorney, became Bentley's first female president.

In 2008, the institution changed its name from Bentley College to Bentley University after receiving authorization from the Massachusetts Board of Higher Education.

Alison Davis-Blake, a former dean of the Carlson School of Management at the University of Minnesota and the Ross School of Business at the University of Michigan, became Bentley's eighth president in July 2018. She stepped down in June 2020 and was succeeded on an interim basis by Paul Condrin, chairman of the board of trustees.

In March 2021, the board of trustees unanimously appointed E. LaBrent Chrite as Bentley's ninth president. Chrite continued to serve as president in 2026.

=== Presidents ===
President	From	To
Harry C. Bentley	1917	1953
Maurice M. Lindsay	1953	1961
Thomas L. Morison	1961	1970
Gregory H. Adamian	1970	1991
Joseph M. Cronin	1991	1997
Joseph G. Morone	1997	2005
Gloria Cordes Larson	2007	2018
Alison Davis-Blake	2018	2020
E. LaBrent Chrite	2021	Incumbent

== Academics ==
The Smith Academic Technology Center at Bentley University.

Bentley University offers undergraduate education through Bachelor of Science and Bachelor of Arts degree programs combining business studies with the liberal arts and sciences. Undergraduate fields include accounting, finance, management, marketing, economics, computer information systems, data analytics, mathematical sciences, humanities, public policy, and other disciplines.

The university's 2026–2027 undergraduate catalog also lists programs in artificial intelligence for innovation, finance and technology, experience design, health industries, sustainability, and creative industries, among other fields.

The McCallum Graduate School of Business offers Master of Business Administration programs and Master of Science degrees in accounting, business analytics, finance, and human factors in information design. Graduate offerings include full-time, part-time, professional, STEM-focused, and healthcare-focused MBA programs. Bentley also offers doctoral programs in accounting and business, including a part-time Executive PhD in Business.

The Master of Science in Human Factors in Information Design focuses on user experience research, usability testing, behavioral science, and the design of digital products and services. The program has offered flexible study options incorporating instruction in California and online learning.

=== Undergraduate admissions ===
In 2024, Bentley University accepted approximately 48% of undergraduate applicants. Admitted applicants had an average high school grade point average (GPA) of 3.75. The university had a test-optional admissions policy under which applicants could submit standardized test scores for consideration.

Among admitted students who submitted standardized test scores, the average SAT score was 1,340 and the average ACT score was 30. Approximately 27% submitted SAT results and 5% submitted ACT results.

=== Rankings ===
U.S. News & World Report ranked Bentley University first among Regional Universities North in its 2026 Best Colleges rankings. The same edition placed Bentley second for Most Innovative Schools in the North, fourth for Best Value Schools in the North, and eleventh for Best Undergraduate Teaching in the North.

In August 2026, The Princeton Review ranked Bentley first nationally for Best Career Services in its 2027 Best Colleges guide. This was the fourth consecutive year that Bentley held the top position in that category, according to the university.

In Bloomberg's 2022–2023 ranking of U.S. business schools, Bentley placed 77th.

== Student life ==
A student residence hall on Bentley University's campus, photographed in 2011.

=== Organizations ===
Bentley University has a variety of student organizations focusing on business, finance, investment management, marketing, entrepreneurship, and other subjects.

Members of Bentley University's College Fed Challenge team with Federal Reserve Chair Janet Yellen in 2014.

The university's Fed Challenge team won the College National Fed Challenge in 2010 and finished second in 2012.

The university is also home to the Bentley Investment Group, a student-run organization that has managed a portion of the university's endowment.

The Bentley Investment Group began in 1997 with $250,000 in capital and 24 original members.

Other academic and professional student organizations have included the Bentley Open Market Committee, Bentley Marketing Association, TAMID, and the Bentley Real Estate Group.

=== Club sports ===
In addition to intercollegiate athletics and intramural sports, Bentley offers club sports and recreational activities for students.

The university's club sports have included the Bentley Equestrian Team, which participates in equestrian activities. Bentley's founder, Harry C. Bentley, was himself an enthusiast of horseback riding.

=== Campus media ===
Student and university publications and media outlets associated with Bentley have included:

- The Vanguard, a student-produced campus newspaper.
- The Vale, a student-produced yearbook.
- Bentley TV, a student-operated campus television organization.
- Piecework, a student-produced literary magazine.
- Bentley Observer, a university publication for alumni.
- WBTY Radio Bentley, a campus radio organization.
- Falcon Records, a student-associated music organization.
- Fusio, an undergraduate research journal associated with the university's honors program.

== Athletics ==
Bentley's Garrett Horsager competing against Air Force's Austin Schwartz during a January 2025 men's ice hockey game.

Bentley's athletic teams are known as the Bentley Falcons, and the university's mascot is Flex the Falcon. Most of the university's varsity teams compete in the Northeast-10 Conference at the NCAA Division II level. The men's ice hockey program competes in Atlantic Hockey America at the NCAA Division I level.

Bentley Arena, located on the university's campus, is the home venue for the men's ice hockey team.

=== Men's ice hockey ===
The Bentley Falcons men's ice hockey program won consecutive Atlantic Hockey America tournament championships in 2025 and 2026, earning the program's first two appearances in the NCAA Division I men's ice hockey tournament.

In the 2025–2026 season, Bentley also won the Atlantic Hockey America regular-season championship for the first time in program history. The Falcons finished the season with a 23–12–5 record, having defeated Sacred Heart University 3–2 in the conference championship game before losing 5–1 to Michigan in the first round of the NCAA tournament.

Andy Jones became the team's head coach in 2023, succeeding Ryan Soderquist, who had coached the program for 21 seasons. Jones was named the 2025–2026 Atlantic Hockey America Coach of the Year.

=== Other sports ===
Bentley's rugby program won two Division III national titles in 2007 and 2008, as well as the 2008 Beast of the East tournament. The program qualified for the Division II national tournament in 2011 and 2012 and won the Rugby Northeast Conference championship in 2011.

Bentley's men's ultimate frisbee team won the USA Ultimate Division III College Championship in 2014.

During the 2025–2026 academic year, Bentley's baseball team won the Northeast-10 Conference championship and reached the NCAA Division II College World Series for the first time in program history. Its men's soccer team also qualified for the NCAA tournament, while the football team won the Northeast-10 Conference title and reached the NCAA playoffs.

== Notable people ==
=== Alumni ===
- George J. Bates, former member of the United States House of Representatives from Massachusetts
- Mackenzy Bernadeau, '08, professional American football player, drafted by the Carolina Panthers in the 2008 NFL draft
- Gailanne Cariddi, former member of the Massachusetts House of Representatives
- C.C. Chapman, '96, author and marketing consultant
- Marcelo Claure, '93, former CEO of Sprint Corporation and founder of Brightstar Corporation
- Patricia Courtney, baseball player in the All-American Girls Professional Baseball League
- Arthur T. Demoulas, supermarket executive associated with Market Basket
- James F. Donovan, businessman, industrialist, and Bentley trustee
- William C. Freda, '74, former vice chairman and managing partner at Deloitte
- Bert Hammel, '73, college basketball coach and Milwaukee Bucks scout
- Brian Hammel, '75, former Bentley basketball player and coach
- Amanda Hesser, '93, food writer, author, and co-founder of Food52
- Gail Huff, '84, television journalist
- Robert B. Kennedy, politician
- Edward J. King, '53, governor of Massachusetts from 1979 to 1983
- David Krikorian, political candidate in Ohio
- William Landergan, member of the Massachusetts House of Representatives from 1935 to 1937
- Todd J. Leach, MBA '85, former chancellor of the University System of New Hampshire
- Jay Leno, former host of The Tonight Show; attended Bentley for one semester
- Lisa Lutoff-Perlo, former president and CEO of Celebrity Cruises
- Christopher P. Lynch, MBA '91, venture capitalist and entrepreneur
- Mike Mangini, '85, drummer of Dream Theater and former instructor at Berklee College of Music
- Alfonso de Orléans-Bourbon, '91, Spanish aristocrat and motorsport executive
- David Pakman, MBA, political commentator and host of The David Pakman Show
- Frederick G. Payne, '25, former U.S. senator and governor of Maine
- Jack Perri, college basketball coach
- Edward J. Powers, former president and general manager of the Boston Garden
- Fahim Saleh, '09, entrepreneur and founder of transportation technology companies
- Ryan Soderquist, '00, former Bentley men's ice hockey player and head coach
- Charles Taylor, '77, former president of Liberia and convicted war criminal
- Derek Tran, attorney and U.S. representative for California's 45th congressional district
- Bradley Walker, '96, basketball executive and sports administrator
- Jason Westrol, '10, professional basketball player

=== Faculty and staff ===
- Mohammad Javad Abdolmohammadi, accounting professor
- Amir Aczel, mathematician and author
- Gregory H. Adamian, Bentley's fourth president
- Harry C. Bentley, founder and first president of Bentley
- Thom Boerman, football coach, 2009–2013
- Selin Sayek Böke, Turkish politician and former assistant professor of economics
- Alison Davis-Blake, Bentley's eighth president, 2018–2020
- Daniel Everett, linguist known for his research on the Pirahã language
- Brian Hammel, former men's basketball coach
- Hal Kopp, football coach, 1972–1975
- Gloria Cordes Larson, Bentley's seventh president
- Jack Perri, basketball coach
- Jack Regan, football coach, 1976–1978
- Alvin Reynolds, former football coach
- Bobby Shuttleworth, former assistant men's soccer coach
- Peter Simonini, former men's soccer coach
- Ryan Soderquist, men's ice hockey head coach from 2001 to 2023
- Barbara Stevens, former women's basketball coach and Naismith Memorial Basketball Hall of Fame inductee
- Scott Sumner, economist and professor
- Peter Yetten, football coach, 1979–2008
