= Ronald Leary =

American football player (born 1989)

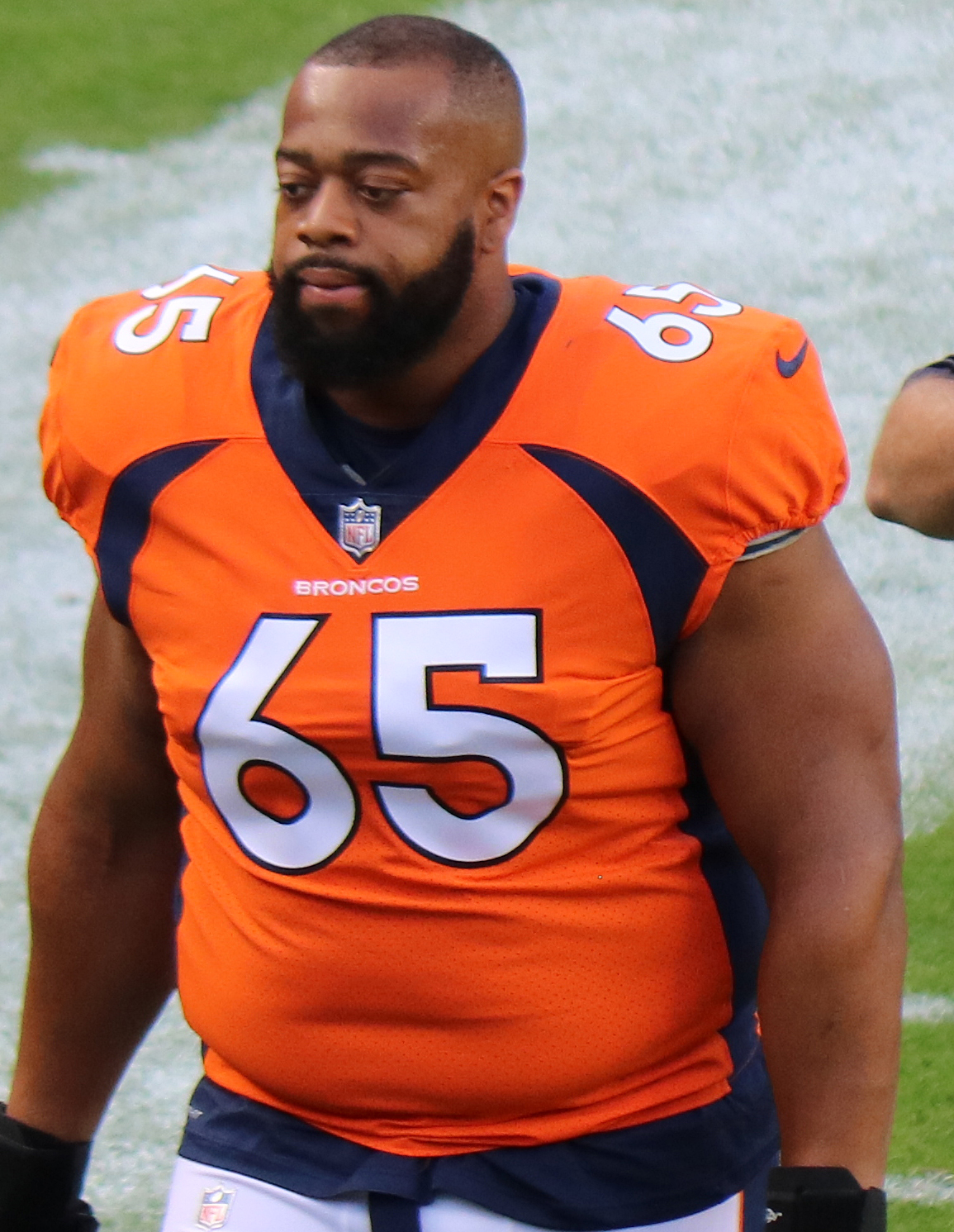
- Leary with the Denver Broncos in 2017

No. 65
- Position: Guard

Personal information
- Born: April 29, 1989 (age 37); Baton Rouge, Louisiana, U.S.
- Listed height: 6 ft 3 in (1.91 m)
- Listed weight: 320 lb (145 kg)

Career information
- High school: Southern Lab (Baton Rouge)
- College: Memphis (2007–2011)
- NFL draft: 2012: undrafted

Career history
- Dallas Cowboys (2012–2016); Denver Broncos (2017–2019)

Awards and highlights
- Built Ford Tough Offensive Line of the Year (2016); Second-team All-C-USA (2011); All-Conference USA Freshman Team (2008)

Career NFL statistics
- Games played: 77
- Games started: 76
- Stats at Pro Football Reference

Ronald Leary (born April 29, 1989) is an American former professional football player who was a guard in the National Football League (NFL). He played college football for the Memphis Tigers and signed with the Dallas Cowboys as an undrafted free agent in 2012. He also played for the Denver Broncos.

== Early life ==
Leary did not start playing organized football until his junior year at Southern University Lab High School, where he earned All-State and All-District honors. He also lettered in basketball.

He accepted a scholarship to play college football at the University of Memphis. As a redshirt freshman, he was a backup for the left and right tackle positions. The next year, he was named the starter at left tackle, where he would remain for the most part of his college career, while making 36 consecutive starts.

During his senior season, he underwent surgery in May 2011 to repair a torn meniscus in his left knee, but didn't miss any games. He ended protecting three different quarterbacks, while starting the first six games at left tackle, before switching to right guard when injuries impacted the offensive line. He was named second-team All-Conference USA and shared team MVP honors with Dontari Poe.

== Professional career ==
=== Dallas Cowboys ===
Leary was not selected in the 2012 NFL draft because of a degenerative left knee condition (osteochondritis dissecans) which could potentially shorten his career. He was signed as an undrafted free agent by the Dallas Cowboys with the intention of playing him at guard. To secure the signing that was seen as a coup, because he was graded as a third round talent, the Cowboys gave him a $9,000 signing bonus and guaranteed $205,000 of his $390,000 base salary.

He was waived on August 30, 2012 and signed to the team's practice squad. He was promoted to the active roster on December 21, for the last two games of the season.

Leary entered the 2013 offseason competing for a starting job on the offensive line. He was getting first-team reps at left guard ahead of an injured Nate Livings, before needing arthroscopic surgery on his right knee during preseason. After missing two weeks, he returned in time to start in the season opener against the New York Giants and proceeded to start in all 16 games at left guard.

In 2014, he earned the left guard starting role over Mackenzy Bernadeau and was a part of arguably the best offensive line in the NFL. His best game came against the Houston Texans, when he contained defensive player of the year J. J. Watt. He started in 15 games, missing one due to a groin injury.

In 2015, Leary received competition from rookie La'el Collins. Although he suffered from a groin injury in training camp, Leary remained the starter at left guard in three of the first five games of the season, with his groin strain forcing him to miss the second and third games. Leary would be declared inactive for 10 straight games. He started in the last game against the Washington Redskins in place of an injured Collins, but left in the third quarter after suffering a concussion and was replaced by Mackenzy Bernadeau.

In 2016, he held out during the offseason program and voluntary activities, while requesting a trade. Although the Cowboys received offers, they chose to decline them and kept Leary for depth. Although he was declared inactive in the first two games of the season, he saw extensive action at left guard in the third game against the Chicago Bears, after Collins was lost for the season with a torn ligament in his right big toe. He finished the season as the Cowboy's left guard. His inclusion on the offensive line, helped rookie Ezekiel Elliott win the NFL rushing title. He suffered a concussion in the fourth quarter against the Cleveland Browns and he did not play in the last game of the season due to a back injury.

=== Denver Broncos ===
On March 9, 2017, Leary signed a four-year, $36 million deal with the Denver Broncos with $20 million guaranteed.

He was named the Broncos' starting right guard to begin the regular season. He started the first 11 games of the season before suffering a back injury in Week 12. He was placed on injured reserve on December 12, 2017.

Leary was named the Broncos starting left guard to start the 2018 season. He started the first six games before suffering a torn Achilles in Week 6. He was placed on injured reserve on October 22, 2018.

In 2019, Leary moved back to right guard, starting the first 12 games before missing the final four due to injury.

After becoming a free agent in March 2020, Leary had a tryout with the Cleveland Browns on August 15, 2020. He worked out for the Dallas Cowboys in September 2020, but announced his retirement on October 9, 2020.
