= 1995–96 Green Bay Phoenix men's basketball team =

American college basketball season

1995–96 Green Bay Phoenix men's basketball

MCC Regular season champions

NCAA tournament
- Conference: Midwestern Collegiate Conference
- Record: 25–4 (16–0 MCC)
- Head coach: Mike Heideman
- Home arena: Brown County Arena

1995–96 Midwestern Collegiate Conference men's basketball standings
	Conf.				Overall
Team	W		L	PCT	W		L	PCT
Green Bay	16	–	0	1.000	25	–	4	.862
Butler	12	–	4	.750	19	–	8	.704
Northern Illinois †	12	–	4	.750	19	–	8	.704
Wright State	8	–	8	.500	14	–	13	.519
Detroit	8	–	8	.500	18	–	11	.621
Milwaukee	5	–	11	.313	9	–	18	.333
UIC	5	–	11	.313	10	–	18	.357
Loyola (IL)	5	–	11	.313	8	–	19	.296
Cleveland State	3	–	13	.188	5	–	21	.192
† 1996 MCC tournament winner As of March 5, 1996; Rankings from AP poll

The 1995–96 Green Bay Phoenix men's basketball team represented the University of Wisconsin–Green Bay in the 1995–96 NCAA Division I men's basketball season. Their head coach was Mike Heideman. The Phoenix played their home games at the Resch Center and were members of the Horizon League. They finished the season 25–4, 16–0 in Horizon League play and lost in the first round of the 1996 NCAA tournament to Virginia Tech.

== Roster ==
1995–96 Green Bay Phoenix men's basketball team
Players
Coaches

Pos.	#	Name	Height	Weight	Year	Hometown
F	33	Jeff Nordgaard	6 ft 7 in (2.01 m)	220 lb (100 kg)	Sr	Dawson, MN
G	34	Ben Berlowski	6 ft 3 in (1.91 m)	—	Sr

Head coach

- Mike Heideman

Assistant coach(es)

Legend

- (C) Team captain
- (S) Suspended
- (I) Ineligible
- (W) Walk-on
- Injured
- Current redshirt

Roster

== Schedule and results ==
Date time, TV	Rank^{#}	Opponent^{#}	Result	Record	Site (attendance) city, state
Regular season
Nov 28, 1995*		Morgan State	W 76–54	1–0	Brown County Arena (5,195); Green Bay, Wisconsin
Dec 1, 1995*		vs. Texas A&M; First Bank Classic	W 60–49	2–0	Bradley Center (NA); Milwaukee, Wisconsin
Dec 2, 1995*		at Marquette; First Bank Classic	L 44–64	2–1	Bradley Center (15,069); Milwaukee, Wisconsin
Dec 6, 1995*		at No. 5 Kentucky	L 62–74	2–2	Rupp Arena (22,825); Lexington, Kentucky
Dec 9, 1995*		Idaho State	W 73–56	3–2	Brown County Arena (4,844); Green Bay, Wisconsin
Dec 13, 1995*		at Oregon	W 81–71 ^{OT}	4–2	McArthur Court (5,812); Eugene, Oregon
Dec 16, 1995		Michigan Tech	W 60–52	5–2 (1–0)	Brown County Arena (5,375); Green Bay, Wisconsin
Dec 23, 1995*		at Western Kentucky	W 59–56 ^{OT}	6–2	E.A. Diddle Arena (5,900); Bowling Green, Kentucky
Dec 29, 1995*		Coppin State; Pepsi Oneida Classic	W 66–57	7–2	Brown County Arena (5,618); Green Bay, Wisconsin
Dec 30, 1995*		Princeton; Pepsi Oneida Classic	W 55–35	8–2	Brown County Arena (5,861); Green Bay, Wisconsin
Jan 4, 1996		Wright State	W 78–52	9–2 (1–0)	Brown County Arena (5,492); Green Bay, Wisconsin
Jan 6, 1996		Cleveland State	W 71–57	10–2 (2–0)	Brown County Arena (5,089); Green Bay, Wisconsin
Feb 19, 1996	No. 25	Milwaukee	W 81–66	22–2 (14–0)	Brown County Arena (5,906); Green Bay, Wisconsin
Feb 22, 1996	No. 25	at Illinois-Chicago	W 90–56	23–2 (15–0)	UIC Pavilion (5,114); Chicago, Illinois
Feb 24, 1996	No. 25	Butler	W 73–66 ^{OT}	24–2 (16–0)	Brown County Arena (6,000); Green Bay, Wisconsin
MCC tournament
Mar 2, 1996*	No. 22	vs. Loyola-Chicago; Quarterfinal	W 58–48	25–2	Ervin J. Nutter Center (NA); Dayton, Ohio
Mar 3, 1996*	No. 22	vs. Detroit Mercy; Semifinal	L 50–56	25–3	Ervin J. Nutter Center (NA); Dayton, Ohio
NCAA tournament
Mar 14, 1996*	(8 MW)	vs. (9 MW) No. 22 Virginia Tech; First Round	L 48–61	25–4	Reunion Arena (13,458); Dallas, Texas
*Non-conference game. ^{#}Rankings from AP poll. (#) Tournament seedings in parentheses. MW=Midwest. All times are in Eastern Time..

== Awards and honors ==
- Jeff Nordgaard – MCC Player of the Year
- Mike Heideman – MCC Coach of the Year
