= Harry C. Bentley =

- Born: February 28, 1877; Harwinton, Connecticut, U.S.
- Died: November 5, 1967; Kinston, North Carolina, U.S.
- Education: Eastman Business College (Two Diplomas); New York University (BS)
- Occupations: Entrepreneur, businessman, accountant, professor, writer
- Known for: Founding of universities, development of the profession of accounting
- Political party: Republican Party
- Spouses: Jennie Belle Crasper (m. 1897; div. 1932) Ruth Myrtle (Daly) Percival (m. 1932; died 1941) Louise (Cheney) Wood (m. 1952)

Harry Clark Bentley (1877—1967) was an American businessman, entrepreneur, accountant, professor, and writer. He is best remembered as the founder, namesake, and first president of Bentley University. Prior to founding the school, Bentley worked as an accountant and professor. He also wrote two widely-respected books on accounting.

== Early life and education ==
Harry C. Bentley was born on February 28, 1877, in Harwinton, Connecticut, the son of Louisa and George Daniel Bentley and the youngest of six children. George Bentley (1837-1908) served as a wagon master for the Union in the Civil War, and afterwards, worked as an itinerant sharecropper and woodcutter. He suffered from schizophrenia, however, and when Harry was two, became so "violently insane" that he was incarcerated in the State Asylum for the Insane in Middleton, Connecticut, where he spent the remainder of his life. After George Bentley's breakdown, his wife Louisa (1839-1919) and their eldest son Daniel Bentley (1862-1953) provided for the family, she by sewing and he by sharecropping. The Bentley family was also aided by George's Army pension. The family was very poor and frequently moved around western Connecticut making it difficult for Bentley to attend school. Thus, Harry only completed seven precollegiate grades. Harry completed schoolwork to please his mother and helped his family to farm, but he performed poorly in both.

While Bentley had many shortcomings in his youth, he had many strengths as well. He stood out due to his athletic ability and often enjoyed playing baseball. He was also an adept leader and organizer, often being able to round up children much bigger than him to play baseball. During his childhood, his mother was very openminded, and thus, allowed Bentley to befriend other boys regardless of whether they were Catholic, Protestant, Jewish, white, or black. As a teenager, Bentley, adept at baseball and other sports, mingled easily with other boys and became a leader of a "gang" in Torrington, Connecticut. While being a member of a gang was much more wholesome in the nineteenth century, Bentley's mother still felt his activities detracted from his schoolwork, and as a result, sent him away to Robbins Preparatory School in Norfolk, Connecticut. There, Bentley excelled as a baseball player, but he performed very poorly in his academic studies. Instead of continuing his studies, his principal, Mrs. Carter, asked Miss Seymour, the daughter of the local innkeeper, to teach Bentley bookkeeping for one hour a day. She accepted and gave Bentley an accounting textbook to read and then quizzed him on concepts in the book, an assignment which Bentley excelled at.

Bentley, more interested in accountancy than his schoolwork, dropped out of Robbins in 1893. For the next year, he "drifted along aimlessly" before seeing an advertisement in The Youth Companion for the Eastman Business College in Poughkeepsie, New York. Setting his sights on attending the school, Bentley worked various jobs in Torrington, Connecticut for the next two years. In 1896, Bentley attended Eastman Business College, and a year later, he graduated from the school with two diplomas, one in business and the other in penmanship.

== Career ==
After graduation, Bentley decided to become a teacher of bookkeeping, commercial arithmetic, business correspondence, and penmanship. Though barely qualified to work as a teacher, Bentley joined a teachers' agency in Torrington, Connecticut, in July, 1897. Two months later, he began working at Childs Business College, a small and financially unstable school which closed in October of the same year. His wife then helped him secure another teaching job, this time in Lewiston, Maine. Bentley only stayed for a few months in the spring of 1898 due to the position's low wage. After hearing about a small but successful new business school that had opened up in Torrington, Bentley returned there with hopes of starting his own business school in Winsted Connecticut. While much smaller than Torrington, Bentley believed the town ten miles north of Torrington was up-and-coming. In 1898, Bentley secured a $50 loan from the President of Winsted Savings Bank to start the school, along with a place to hold classes from a local landlord. After placing an ad in The Winsted Citizen, Winsted Business College opened on October 3, 1898. In its nascency, the college was located on the third floor of the Opera building and had two instructors and seven evening students. Bentley taught bookkeeping while his wife taught stenography. Due to the couple's strong reputation as quality teachers, Winsted's student population was growing and the school eventually moved to the second floor of the Colt building and began offering day classes. The school was coeducational and Bentley claimed that it was the fifth- or sixth-largest enterprise of its kind in Connecticut. The school was geographically isolated, however, and its modest success didn't excite Bentley, so in 1900, Bentley sold the school after seeing an advertisement for America's first university-level program for accounting at the newly-opened School of Commerce at New York University. [Continue]

He sold the school and enrolled at New York University as part of the initial class at NYU's School of Commerce, Accounts and Finance, but Bentley was not given his degree in 1903 because he did not have a high school diploma. Later in his life, NYU mailed him his diploma. After graduation, Bentley worked as an accountant and partner at several accounting firms and then served as a professor at Simmons College in Boston. Bentley was the founding dean of the Boston YMCA School of Commerce and Finance which became a department of Northeastern University. He worked there until 1916. Bentley was then appointed a professor of accounting at Boston University's School of Business Administration. He then resigned from this professorship and started Bentley College after many of his BU students wished him to continue to teach them. Bentley served as a professor and the first president of Bentley until 1953. He died on November 5, 1967, in Kinston, North Carolina. Bentley was a supporter of various American artists and was interested in running, baseball, horseback riding, and wrestling. Bentley was a Protestant Christian and a supporter of the Republican Party.
