= William C. Freda =

William C. Freda is vice chairman and managing partner of Deloitte Touche Tohmatsu. Freda serves as a member of the Committee on Capital Markets Regulation. He also is a member of Youth, I.N.C.'s National Advisory Board.

== Education ==
Freda is a graduate of Bentley University, where he has been a member of the Harry C. Bentley Society, the university's leadership donor organization.
