= Waltham High School =

Location
- 554 Lexington Street; Waltham, Massachusetts 02452; United States; 42.3959°N 71.2404°W

Information
- Type: Public
- Established: 1849
- School district: Waltham Public Schools
- Principal: William Conard (2026 - present)
- Staff: 166.95 (FTE)
- Grades: 9–12
- Enrollment: 1,816 (2023–24)
- Student to teacher ratio: 10.9:1
- Campus: Suburban
- Colors: Red and white
- Mascot: Hawk
- Rival: Arlington High School
- Newspaper: The Talon Tribune
- Yearbook: The Mirror

Waltham High School is a public high school in Waltham, Massachusetts, United States. Founded in 1849, it is among the oldest public secondary schools in the Commonwealth and one of two high schools in the Waltham Public Schools district.

== History ==
=== 1849 – 1903: first campus ===
City voters authorized a dedicated high‑school building in 1849; the brick structure at Church and School Streets served students for more than fifty years.

=== 1902 – 1969: second campus (55 School St.) ===
A Classical‑Revival/Romanesque building—designed by Samuel Patch and Robert Glancey—opened in 1902 and was expanded in the 1920s. It housed Waltham High until September 1969, then Central Junior High, and since 2003 has formed the historic façade of John W. McDevitt Middle School. The original portion was listed on the National Register of Historic Places in 1989.

=== 1969 – 2024: third campus (617 Lexington St.) ===
The third incarnation, opened in 1969, comprised 265,000 sq ft of vocational shops, science wings, and a 1,000‑seat auditorium. Accreditation concerns and aging systems placed the school on NEASC warning in 2005, spurring replacement planning.

=== 2024 – present: fourth campus (554 Lexington St.) ===
After prolonged debate, the city took the 33‑acre former Stigmatine Fathers property by eminent domain in 2018 and approved a $375 million bond in 2019; the Massachusetts School Building Authority contributed $118 million. Construction began in September 2020, and the 422,000‑sq‑ft, net‑zero‑ready campus welcomed students for the 2024‑25 school year.

== Academics ==
- Advanced coursework: 20 AP offerings; 45% student participation.
- CTE pathways: Engineering technology, robotics, biotechnology, health assisting, culinary arts, early‑childhood education, and more.
- Student–teacher ratio: 10.9:1 (2023–24).

== Athletics ==
Waltham competes in MIAA Division I within the Dual County League.

- Baseball: Division 1 state champions (1964).
- Ice hockey: Division 1 state champions (2002, 2018).
- Cheerleading: State champions (2016, 2021, 2022, 2024); national titles in 2016, 2017, 2021, 2024.(8x North Regional Champions, 15x Dual County League Champions)

The football teams of 1906 and 1907 finished undefeated during an era without formal playoffs.

== Performing arts ==
The fine‑arts department fields one competitive and one least competitive neglected show‑choirs—Music Unlimited (mixed‑voice) and Music Express (Mixed Voice‑voice formerly Treble-Voiced)—and hosts the annual Eastern Show Choir Festival. Year‑end productions include Senior Revue (est. 1968) and Dance Theater.

== Leadership ==
=== Administration (2025 – 26) ===
- Superintendent: Dr. Marisa Mendonsa (July 2024 – present)
- Principal: John Barnes (July 2025 - June 2026)
- Associate principals: Dr. Shelby Hale Roper (Class of 2026), Dr. MaryJo Rendon (Class of 2027), Robert Admire (Class of 2028), Dr. Robert Lyons (Class of 2029)
- Athletic director: Steve LaForest

=== Principals ===
Tenure	Principal	Notes
Jul 1986 – Jun 2010	John B. Graceffa	Promoted from associate principal on 1 July 1986; retired at the close of the 2009‑10 school year.
2010 – Jun 2018	Gregory DeMeo	Expanded AP offerings; retired after 35 years in education.
Jul 2018 – Jun 2021	Paul Maiorano (interim)	Steadied planning for the new campus.
Jul 2021 – Jul 2022	Brenda Peña	First Latina and first woman principal; resigned weeks before 2022‑23.
Aug 2022 – Jun 2025	Darrell Braggs	Named interim Aug 2022, earned a three‑year contract in May 2023, stepped down in Jun 2025.
Jul 2025 - Jun 2026	John Barnes (interim)	Name Principal in Residence in 2025 on what was supposed to be a 3 year contract, resigned on June 30th, 2026.

=== 2024 – 25 principal transition ===
Principal Darrell Braggs emailed families on December 23, 2024 announcing his June 2025 departure. A committee named three finalists—Donavan Tracey Jr., Courtney Gosselin, Mike Sabin—on March 27, 2025, but on April 3, 2025 Superintendent Dr. Marisa Mendonsa restarted the search, saying "we had not yet found the right fit." John Barnes was hired as a principal-in-residence on July 20, 2025.

=== Superintendents of Waltham Public Schools (since 2007) ===
Years	Superintendent	Notes
2007 – 2010	Peter Azar	Resigned after dispute with school committee.
2011 – 2015	Susan Nicholson	Retired June 2015
2015 – 2018	Dr. Drew Echelson	Left for Harvard's Ed.L.D. program; doubled AP participation district‑wide.
2019	George Frost (interim)	One‑year bridge.
2020 – Oct 2023	Brian Reagan	Oversaw construction of the new WHS; left for Hudson, MA, superintendent post.
Dec 2023 – present	Dr. Marisa Mendonsa	Appointed December 2023, assumed office 1 July 2024. Contract through 2027.

== Notable alumni ==
- Mackenzy Bernadeau – NFL offensive lineman.
- Rob Chiarelli – Grammy‑winning record producer/mix engineer.
- Pauline R. Kezer – Former Connecticut Secretary of State.
- Jeff Lazaro – NHL right‑wing.
- Mike Mangini – Drummer, Dream Theater.
- Tony Massarotti – Sports columnist and broadcaster.
- Fred Smerlas – NFL defensive tackle.
