= Bentley Falcons football =

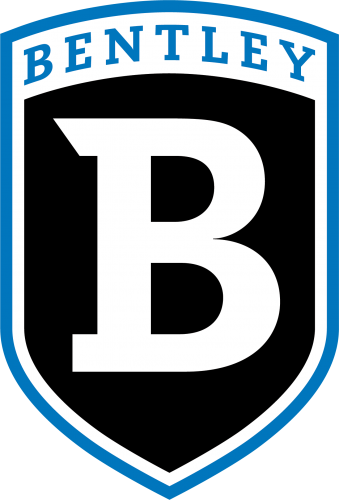
- First season: 1972; 54 years ago
- Athletic director: Vaughn Williams
- Head coach: CJ Scarpa; 1st season, 7–4 (.636)
- Location: Waltham, Massachusetts
- Stadium: Peter Yetten Football Stadium at Bentley University (capacity: 6,800)
- Conference: Northeast 10 Conference
- Colors: Blue and white

The Bentley Falcons football team represents Bentley University in NCAA Division II college football.

== Coaches ==
- Hal Kopp (1972–1975)
- Jack Regan (1976–1978)
- Peter Yetten (1979–2008)
- Thom Boerman (2009–2013)
- Bill Kavanaugh (2014–2021)
- Alvin Reynolds (2022–2023)
- Saj Thakkar (2023–2024)
- CJ Scarpa (2025–present)

== Notable players ==
- Mackenzy Bernadeau, '08, professional football player who was last with the Jacksonville Jaguars organization; drafted 250th overall in 2008 NFL draft by the Carolina Panthers

== Playoff appearances ==
=== NCAA Division II ===
Bentley has made four appearances in the NCAA Division II playoffs, with a combined record of 0–4.

Year	Round	Opponent	Result
2003	First Round	Grand Valley State	L, 36–65
2004	First Round	Edinboro	L, 44–47
2021	First Round	New Haven	L, 13–38
2025	First Round	Kutztown	L, 0–52
