= Flex the Falcon =

Sports Mascot

Flex at Falcon Fest

Flex the Falcon is the mascot of Bentley University. Bentley University is a private co-educational university outside of Boston, Massachusetts that is focused on business.

Flex's birthday is September 30 which is celebrated by students at an event called Falcon Fest.

== Activities ==
Flex the Falcon supports the Bentley University's 23 men's and women's varsity teams that compete in the Northeast-10 Conference at the NCAA Division II level. When Flex is not busy supporting the 23 men's and women's varsity teams, he helps campus organizations promote their events such as when he was seen featured on La Cultura Latina's video promoting their Latin Dance night. Flex has also made appearances on both Fox 25 WFXT news as well as the Today show on NBC when Bentley University's Career Services was ranked number one in the country for the year of 2016.
