= Alvin Reynolds =

American football player and coach (born 1959)

Personal information
- Born: June 24, 1959 (age 67); Pineville, Louisiana, U.S.

Career information
- High school: West Jefferson (Harvey, Louisiana)
- College: Indiana State

Career history
- Indiana State (1982) Graduate assistant; Indiana State (1983–1989) Secondary coach; Indiana State (1990–1992) Assistant head coach & secondary coach; Denver Broncos (1993–1995) Assistant defensive backs coach & quality control coach; Baltimore Ravens (1996–1998) Defensive backs coach; Carolina Panthers (1999–2002) Defensive quality control coach & defensive assistant; Jacksonville Jaguars (2003–2007) Defensive backs coach; Atlanta Falcons (2008–2011) Defensive backs coach; Billerica Memorial HS (MA) (2015–2016) Defensive coordinator & defensive backs coach; Reading Memorial HS (MA) (2017) Defensive backs coach; Bentley (2018–2019) Defensive backs coach; Bentley (2020–2021) Defensive coordinator & defensive backs coach; Bentley (2022-2023) Head coach; Everett HS (MA) (2024) Defensive coordinator

Awards and highlights
- Dr. Earl L. Avery MLK Leadership Award (2020)

Head coaching record
- Regular season: 7–3–0 (.700)
- Career: 7–3–0 (.700)

Alvin Reynolds (born June 24, 1959) is a former college and National Football League (NFL) defensive backs coach.

== Playing career ==
Reynolds attended Indiana State, where he played on the football team for four years. Over his career he appeared in 33 games recording five interceptions for 39 yards.

== Coaching career ==
=== College career ===
After graduation, Reynolds began his coaching career in 1982. He was on the staff for the 1984 Indiana State football team, a team that was inducted into the Indiana State University Athletics Hall-of-Fame in 2012.

=== National Football League ===
In 1993, Reynolds joined the Denver Broncos coaching staff where he was an assistant defensive backs and quality control coach for three seasons. In 1996, he became the first defensive backs coach in Ravens history. He served in that position for three seasons. In 1999, he joined the Carolina Panthers as a defensive quality control and was also a defensive assistant for four seasons. After leaving the Panthers, he joined the coaching staff of the Jacksonville Jaguars where he served for five seasons as defensive backs coach from 2003 to 2007. He then joined the Atlanta Falcons in 2008, coaching the defensive backs until he was fired after the 2011 season.

In 2013, Reynolds guested with the Saskatchewan Roughriders.

=== Return to college ===
In 2018, Reynolds return to the college ranks as a defensive backs coach for Bentley University. In 2020, he was promoted to Defensive coordinator. In 2022, he was promoted again, this time to head coach, his first head coaching role.

=== High school ===
In 2024, Reynolds was hired as the defensive coordinator at Everett High School in Everett, Massachusetts. He served in that position for one season.

== Head coaching record ==
Year	Team	Overall	Conference	Standing	Bowl/playoffs
Bentley Falcons (Northeast-10 Conference) (2022)
2022	Bentley	7–3	5–2		
Bentley:		7–3	5–2		
Total:		7–3			
