= Matt Hicks (basketball) =

American basketball player (born c.1956)

Personal information
- Born: c. 1956
- Listed height: 6 ft 4 in (1.93 m)

Career information
- High school: West Aurora (Aurora, Illinois)
- College: DePaul (1973–1974); Northern Illinois (1975–1977)
- NBA draft: 1977: 4th round, 81st overall pick
- Drafted by: San Antonio Spurs
- Position: Forward

Career highlights
- 2× AP honorable mention All-American (1976, 1977); MAC Player of the Year (1977); 2× First-team All-MAC (1976, 1977)
- Stats at Basketball Reference

Mathew Hicks (born c. 1956) is an American former professional basketball player. He played part of the 1973–74 NCAA Division I men's basketball season for the DePaul Blue Demons men's basketball before being discovered to be academically ineligible. He immediately transferred from DePaul University to Northern Illinois University to join Northern Illinois Huskies men's basketball. At Northern Illinois, he was a two-time All-Mid-American Conference first-team selection and 1977 Mid-American Conference Player of the Year. He had played for West Aurora High School in Aurora, Illinois, a suburb of Chicago, before college.

== High school ==
Matthew Hicks barely made his school's 8th grade "B" basketball team. When he was a high school junior, he only scored 72 points for the varsity team. As a senior, in 1973 he tallied 718 points. In 2007, the Chicago Sun-Times dubbed the 1973 game between West Aurora and East Aurora High School, as the best athletic contest in school history. Although Hicks contributed 20 points, the final margin in the 50–48 contest was a tipin by teammate Craig Hardy. In an early-round Illinois High School Association (IHSA) Class AA playoff game, Hicks had a storied face off against Ernie Kent of Rockford West High School, in which he outscored the foul-plagued Kent 29–17 as part of a 60–52 victory. In the 1973 IHSA Class AA state championship tournament, Hicks, who went by the nickname Skip at that time, went 5–16 (3–12 in the second half) in scoring 13 points in the semifinal 39–33 upset loss to New Trier High School. Hicks rebounded in the consolation game with 30 points to defeat Lockport Central High School 67–45 for third place, the highest finish for West Aurora since the 2nd place 1959 team. Hicks finished with a tournament high 87-point four-game total. He made the All-Tournament team along with future NBA All-Star Rickey Green, Alvin Green, future MLB Rookie of the Year John Castino, and Bob Bone.

== DePaul ==
As a freshman for DePaul, Hicks started some early-season games. Described as a "great leaper" with an 82-inch (208.3 cm) wingspan, Hicks' first start was on December 8, 1973, when DePaul visited Northwestern at McGaw Hall. Hicks averaged 11.8 points and 8.9 rebounds in DePaul's first 10 games.

Hicks' high school grades were below the 2.0 GPA meaning that he should have been ineligible to play as a freshman, but he was on the roster due to an oversight by head coach Ray Meyer. Even though he had a B− average during his first quarter at DePaul, when another Chicago area school reported that he should have been ineligible, the National Collegiate Athletic Association investigated and ruled him ineligible. As of January 5, 1974, Hicks was still a highly regarded performer for the DePaul team and had just made an early season All-Tournament team. However, he was sidelined pending a meeting to consider his eligibility before DePaul's January 6 game against Saint Joseph's.

== Northern Illinois ==
On January 16, 1974, Hicks enrolled at Northern Illinois University (NIU). In his January 14, 1975, debut for Northern Illinois, he contributed 13 points off the bench including 2 overtime baskets in the 87–86 victory over Weber State. At Northern Illinois, he was a two-time All-Mid-American Conference first-team selection as a junior and as a senior in 1976 and 1977 earning Mid-American Conference Men's Basketball Player of the Year honors in 1977. He led the conference in scoring (25.0 and 25.3) and rebounding (12.8 and 13.0) as both a junior and a senior. He was an honorable mention All-American by the Associated Press (1976, 1977), Sporting News (1976, 1977), and Converse (1977).

After his 2.5 season career at NIU, Hicks left the school as its all-time leader in career points (1,513) scored, single-season points scored (682), single-MAC conference game points (42, Kent State March 7, 1977), single-MAC conference game rebounds (23, Eastern Michigan March 3, 1976) and career double-doubles (50). The single-MAC conference game rebounds record was still listed as the current record in the 2019–20 school record book. Paul Dawkins eclipsed some of Hicks' records including career points in 1979. He was named MAC player of the week twice as a junior (January 28 and March 2, 1976) and three times as a senior (Jan 2, Feb 1 and 8, 1977).

Hicks was not listed on the 1977 Pizza Hut All-American game ballot, but an organized write-in campaign in which his 950 dormitory mates cast 65,000 write in ballots got him selected. The Northern Illinois sports information director Bud Nangle and Rochelle, Illinois, Pizza Hut owner organized the effort to get him voted into the top 8 positions in the voting. The ballot box stuffing also pushed Chicago ballers Green and Bo Ellis into 2nd and 3rd place in the ballot. Hicks finished 7th. He lost the halftime slam dunk contest to Marques Johnson.

== Personal life ==
Hicks' younger siblings and his son Theo played high school basketball for West Aurora. His younger brother, Ron, played basketball at George Williams College.
