= Donald Whiteside =

American basketball player

Personal information
- Born: April 25, 1969 (age 57) Chicago, Illinois, U.S.
- Listed height: 5 ft 10 in (1.78 m)
- Listed weight: 160 lb (73 kg)

Career information
- High school: Leo (Chicago, Illinois)
- College: Northern Illinois (1987–1991)
- NBA draft: 1991: undrafted
- Playing career: 1992–2001
- Position: Point guard
- Number: 12, 20

Career history
- 1992: Goldfields Giants
- 1992: Hobart Devils
- 1992–1993: Rockford Lightning
- 1993: Hobart Devils
- 1993–1994: Caracas Panthers
- 1994–1995: Rīgas Laiks
- 1996–1997: Toronto Raptors
- 1997: Atlanta Hawks
- 1997–1998: BK Opava
- 1998–1999: Cáceres CB
- 1999: Rockford Lightning
- 2000–2001: Chicago Skyliners
- Stats at NBA.com
- Stats at Basketball Reference

Donald Whiteside (born April 25, 1969) is an American former professional basketball player. Listed as a 5'10", 160 lb point guard, he played college basketball for Northern Illinois University.

In 1992, Whiteside had a brief stint with the Goldfields Giants, before going on to play two seasons in the NBL for the Hobart Devils in 1992 and 1993. Between 1996 and 1997, he played in the NBA for the Toronto Raptors and Atlanta Hawks. He also had stints in Latvia (for Rīgas Laiks), Czech Republic and Spain, as well as in the Continental Basketball Association and the American Basketball Association.
