= Mackenzy Bernadeau =

American football player (born 1986)

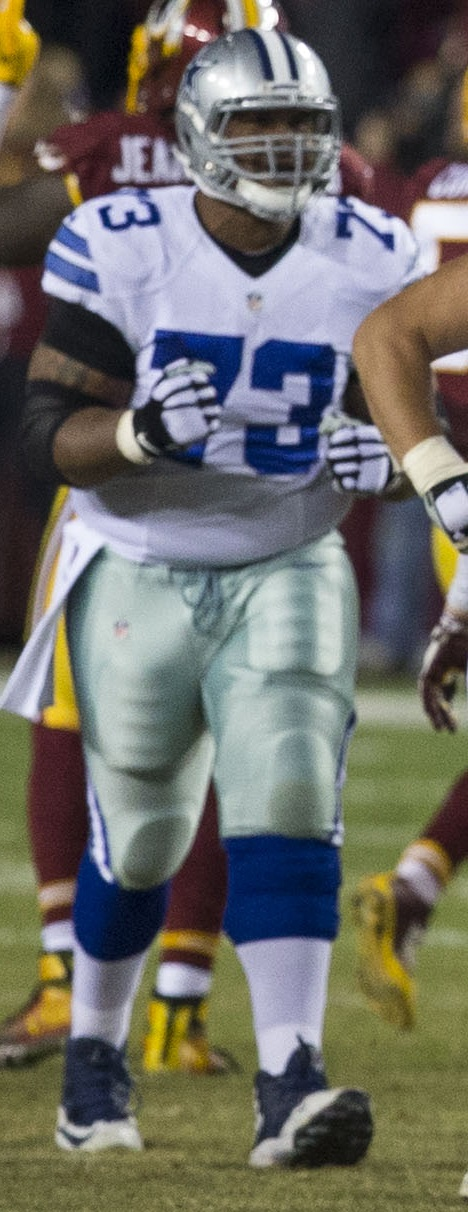
- Bernadeau with the Dallas Cowboys in 2015

No. 73, 74
- Position: Guard

Personal information
- Born: January 3, 1986 (age 40); Waltham, Massachusetts, U.S.
- Listed height: 6 ft 4 in (1.93 m)
- Listed weight: 322 lb (146 kg)

Career information
- High school: Waltham
- College: Bentley
- NFL draft: 2008: 7th round, 250th overall pick

Career history
- Carolina Panthers (2008–2011); Dallas Cowboys (2012–2015); Jacksonville Jaguars (2016)*
- * Offseason or practice squad member only

Awards and highlights
- All-American (2007); 3× ECAC Division II All-Star (2005, 2006); 3× First-team All-Northeast 10 (2005–2007); 2× Northeast 10 OL of the Year (2006, 2007)

Career NFL statistics
- Games played: 95
- Games started: 48
- Stats at Pro Football Reference

Mackenzy Bernadeau (born January 3, 1986) is an American former professional football player who was a guard in the National Football League (NFL). He played college football for the Bentley Falcons before being selected by the Carolina Panthers in the seventh round of the 2008 NFL draft.

== Early life ==
Bernadeau attended Plympton Elementary School and Waltham High School, where he practiced football, basketball and track.

He accepted a football scholarship from Bentley University in his hometown of Waltham, Massachusetts, where he was named the starting left tackle as a freshman. He was switched to the left guard position midway through his junior year. He started 37 straight games (25 at left tackle and 12 at left guard), before suffering a torn meniscus on his left knee during the sixth game of his senior season. He is the second Bentley player to ever be drafted and the only one to make an NFL roster. He majored in management.

In 2016, he was inducted into the Northeast-10 Conference Hall of Fame.

== Professional career ==
=== Carolina Panthers ===
Bernadeau was selected in the seventh round (250th overall) of the 2008 NFL draft. He was the first Northeast-10 Conference player ever drafted in the NFL. In 2009, he appeared in all 16 games, starting at left guard during the last seven games, after left tackle Jordan Gross was lost for the season with an injury and Travelle Wharton was forced to move from guard to tackle.

His best season with the Panthers came the next year, when he started 12 games (five at right guard and the last seven at left guard). In 2011, he lost his starting position to Wharton, playing in 15 games with one start at left guard.

=== Dallas Cowboys ===
On March 14, 2012, Bernadeau signed with the Dallas Cowboys as a free agent. After having hip and knee surgery in the offseason, his level of play suffered, even though he started 16 games (including his first two career starts at center) for the first time in his career.

The next year, he had another offseason surgery, this time in his right shoulder. After starting the first game of the 2013 season, the Cowboys signed former Pro Bowler Brian Waters to start in place of Bernadeau and improve the level of play on the offensive line. After Waters was lost for the season with a triceps injury in the eighth game, Bernadeau regained his starter role and went on to play his best football as a Cowboy.

Looking to improve the guard position, the team selected Zack Martin (named All-Pro as a rookie) in the first round of the 2014 NFL draft and moved Bernadeau to compete for the left guard position, which eventually went to Ronald Leary. He only started one game in place of an injured Leary and remained as a backup for the rest of the season.

In 2015, he was used as a versatile backup that could play any of the interior positions of the offensive line, including center. He started in the second game of the season against the Philadelphia Eagles, replacing an injured Ronald Leary at left guard. He saw limited action until the last game of the season against the Washington Redskins, when he replaced an injured Leary in the third quarter.

=== Jacksonville Jaguars ===
On March 11, 2016, Bernadeau signed a two-year contract with the Jacksonville Jaguars. Although he began training camp as the starter at left guard, he was passed on the depth chart by Chris Reed and Patrick Omameh and was relegated to third-string center duties. He was released on September 3.

== Personal life ==
Bernadeau is one of six siblings. Bernadeau enjoys karaoke as he is a world recognized champion in the activity. Competing in Berlin in 2012 and Montreal in 2013 Bernadeau took home gold in both events. He credits his mother for giving him his sweet-sounding voice.
