= Jack Regan (American football) =

American association football player (1930–2015)

Biographical details
- Born: c. 1930; Medford, Massachusetts, U.S.
- Died: May 2, 2015

Playing career
- 1956–1957: Boston University

Coaching career (HC unless noted)
- 1976–1978: Bentley

Head coaching record
- Overall: 12–10–2

John G. Regan was an American football coach. He served as the head football coach at Bentley University from 1976 to 1978, compiling a career record of 151–60–1 as a varsity coach and 12–10–2 overall.

Regan played college football at Boston University as a wide receiver on the 1956 and 1957 teams.

== Head coaching record ==
| Year | Team | Overall | Conference | Standing | Bowl/playoffs |
|---|---|---|---|---|---|
Bentley Falcons (National Club Football Association) (1976–1978)
| 1976 | Bentley | 3–3–2 | | | |
| 1977 | Bentley | 3–4 | | | |
| 1978 | Bentley | 6–3 | | | |
| Bentley: | | 12–10–2 | | | |
| Total: | | 12–10–2 | | | |
