= Peter Yetten =

American college football coach

Peter Yetton
Biographical details
- Born: Waltham, Massachusetts, U.S.
- Education: Boston University

Playing career

Ice hockey
- 1968–1971: Boston University
- Position: Defenceman

Coaching career (HC unless noted)

Football
- 1976–1978: Bentley (assistant)
- 1979–2008: Bentley

Head coaching record
- Overall: 151–60–1 (varsity); 71–21–1 (club)
- Bowls: 0–1
- Tournaments: 0–2 (NCAA D-II playoffs)

Accomplishments and honors

Championships
- 4 ECFC (1990, 1992–1994); 1 EFC Bay State Division (1998); 2 Northeast-10 (2003–2004)

Awards
- Bentley Hall of Fame (2000)

Peter Yetten is an American former college football coach. He was the head football coach at Bentley University from 1979 to 2008, compiling a career record of 151–60–1 as a varsity coach and 222–81–2 overall.

Yetten played three seasons for the ice hockey program at Boston University, helping the team to their first national championship in 1971. At Bentley, he guided the football program from a club team to varsity status.

== Head coaching record ==
=== Varsity ===
Year	Team	Overall	Conference	Standing	Bowl/playoffs	AFCA^{#}
Bentley Falcons (Eastern Collegiate Football Conference) (1988–1996)
1988	Bentley	3–2–1 (Note: Does not include games against club opponents Merrimack and Providence.)	2–1–1			
1989	Bentley	5–4	2–2	4th		
1990	Bentley	7–1	4–0	1st		
1991	Bentley	5–4	4–1	2nd		
1992	Bentley	9–1	6–0	1st	L Northwest Bowl	
1993	Bentley	10–0	6–0	1st		
1994	Bentley	11–0	6–0	1st		
1995	Bentley	9–1	7–1	2nd		
1996	Bentley	7–3	7–1	2nd		
Bentley Falcons (Eastern Football Conference) (1997–2000)
1997	Bentley	6–3	5–3	2nd (Bay State)		
1998	Bentley	8–2	7–2	T–1st (Bay State)		
1999	Bentley	4–7	3–6	4th (Central)		
2000	Bentley	5–6	4–5	3rd (Central)		
Bentley Falcons (Northeast-10 Conference) (2001–2008)
2001	Bentley	9–3	8–2	T–2nd		
2002	Bentley	10–1	9–1	2nd		24
2003	Bentley	10–1	9–0	1st	L NCAA Division II First Round	19
2004	Bentley	8–2	8–1	T–1st	L NCAA Division II First Round	20
2005	Bentley	7–3	7–2	T–2nd		
2006	Bentley	6–5	4–5	T–6th		
2007	Bentley	7–3	6–3	4th		
2008	Bentley	5–6	4–3	T–3rd		
Bentley:		151–60–1	118–39–1			
Total:		151–60–1				
National championship Conference title Conference division title or championship game berth

=== Club ===
Year	Team	Overall	Conference	Standing	Bowl/playoffs
Bentley Falcons (National Club Football Association) (1979–1987)
1979	Bentley	6–3	5–3		
1980	Bentley	7–4	5–3		
1981	Bentley	7–3	6–2		
1982	Bentley	10–0–1	7–0–1		
1983	Bentley	9–2	7–2		
1984	Bentley	7–3	5–2		
1985	Bentley	6–4	4–3		
1986	Bentley	9–1	8–0		
1986	Bentley	10–1	8–1		
Bentley:		71–21–1	55–16–1		
Total:		71–21–1			
