= Thom Boerman =

American football coach

Biographical details
- Born: 1952 or 1953 (age 72–73)
- Education: Ferris State University

Coaching career (HC unless noted)
- 1986–2007: Bentley (DB)
- 2008: Bentley (DC)
- 2009–2013: Bentley

Head coaching record
- Overall: 33–17

Accomplishments and honors

Championships
- 2 NE-10 (2009–2010)

Thom Boerman is a retired American football coach. He served as the head football coach at Bentley University from 2009 to 2013, compiling a career record of 33–17. He shared the Northeast-10 Conference championship in 2009.

Prior to being named head coach in 2009, Boerman was an assistant coach at Bentley, serving as a defensive backs coach from 1986 to 2007 and defensive coordinator in 2008 Boerman announced his retirement at the end of the 2013 season.

== Head coaching record ==
Year	Team	Overall	Conference	Standing	Bowl/playoffs
Bentley Falcons (Northeast-10 Conference) (2009–2013)
2009	Bentley	8–2	6–2	T–1st	
2010	Bentley	5–4	6–2	T–1st	
2011	Bentley	6–4	5–3	T–3rd	
2012	Bentley	8–2	6–2	3rd	
2013	Bentley	6–5	4–5	6th	
Bentley:		33–17	27–14		
Total:		33–17			
National championship Conference title Conference division title or championship game berth
