= Northern Illinois Huskies men's basketball =

Basketball team representing Northern Illinois University

2026–27 Northern Illinois Huskies men's basketball team
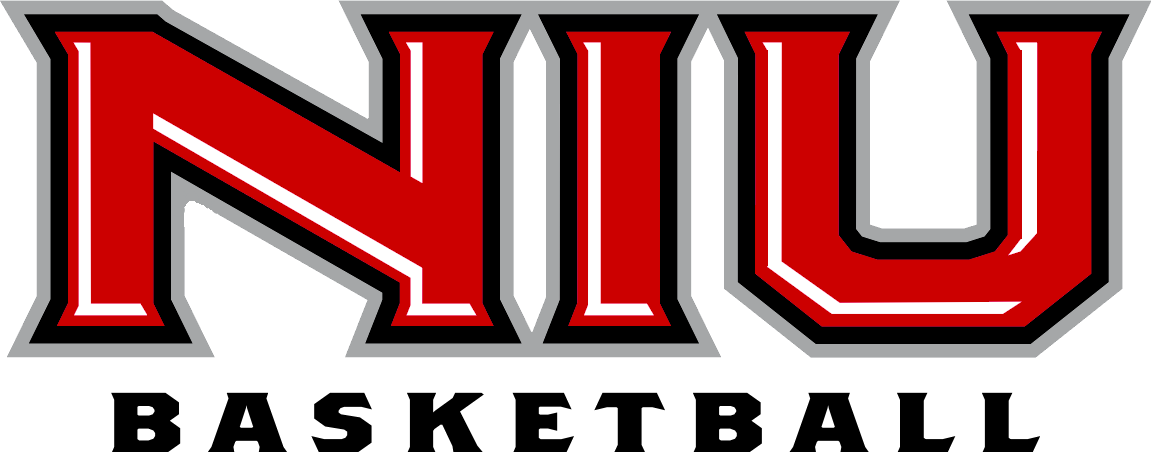
- University: Northern Illinois University
- Head coach: Matt Majkrzak (1st season)
- Location: DeKalb, Illinois
- Arena: NIU Convocation Center (capacity: 10,000)
- Conference: Horizon League
- Nickname: Huskies
- Colors: Cardinal and black

NCAA Division I tournament appearances
- 1958*, 1982, 1991, 1996

Conference tournament champions
- IIAC: 1932; MAC: 1982; MCC: 1996

Conference regular-season champions
- IIAC: 1933, 1934, 1935, 1941, 1945; Midwestern: 1972; MAC: 1981; Mid-Con: 1991

Conference division champions
- MAC: 2006, 2020

Uniforms
Home	Away
- * at Division II level

The Northern Illinois Huskies men's basketball team represents Northern Illinois University (NIU) in DeKalb, Illinois. The school's team currently competes in the Horizon League. The team last played in the NCAA Division I men's basketball tournament in 1996.

== History ==
=== Conference affiliations ===
- 1900–01 to 1919–20: Independent
- 1920–21 to 1965–66: Illinois Intercollegiate Athletic Conference
- 1966–67 to 1967–70: NCAA Division I Independent
- 1970–71 to 1971–72: Midwestern Conference
- 1972–73 to 1974–75: NCAA Division I Independent
- 1975–76 to 1985–86: Mid-American Conference
- 1986–87 to 1989–90: NCAA Division I Independent
- 1990–91 to 1993–94: Mid-Continent Conference (Note: Now known as the Summit League since 2007–08.)
- 1994–95 to 1996–97: Midwestern Collegiate Conference (Note: Now known as the Horizon League since 2001–02.)
- 1997–98 to 2025–26: Mid-American Conference
- 2026–27 to present: Horizon League

== First-team All-MAC ==
- Eugene German (born 1997), in 2020.

== The All-Century Team ==
=== Best of Northern Illinois men's basketball (1900-2000) ===
The Northern Illinois University athletic department celebrated 100 years of Huskies basketball in the 2000–01 season. A panel of 29 Administrators, NIU Staff/Faculty, NIU Alumni, Media and NIU Media Services were given the opportunity to cast votes for the greatest players to ever don the cardinal and black of Northern Illinois University, resulting in a total of 46 players. Eighty-six different Huskie players received at least one vote, including 33 Northern Illinois Hall of Famers, plus 12 performers either drafted or signed as free agents by the National Basketball Association. Members of the All-Century Team were acknowledged at halftime of the NIU-Ball State Cardinals men's basketball game on Saturday February 17, 2001 in Chick Evans Field House.

No.	Player	Pos.	Career	Height	Hometown	Votes	All-American	Player of the Year	MAC/Midwestern/IICA All-Conference	Career Points	Note
33	Kenny Battle	F	1984-86	6-6	Aurora, IL	29	✓		✓	1,072	Jersey in College Basketball HOF
24	Jim Bradley	F/C	1971-73	6-10	East Chicago, IN	29	✓		✓	1,134	NIU Player of the Century
35	T.J. Lux	F/C	1995-2000	6-9	Merrillville, IN	29	✓		✓	1,996	NIU All-Time leading scorer
40	Allen Rayhorn	C	1978-82	6-9	Rock City, IL	29	✓		✓	1,848	NIU All-Time leader in FT and FTA
10	Donald Whiteside	PG	1987-91	5-10	Chicago, IL	28			✓	1,155	Played in the CBA, ABA & NBA
34	Matt Hicks	F	1974-77	6-4	Aurora, IL	27	✓	✓	✓	1,513	MAC Player of the Year 1976–77
44	Donnell Thomas	F	1987-91	6-4	Chicago, IL	27			✓	1,853	Lead NIU in rebounding four consecutive seasons
13	Larry Wyllie	G	1956-59	6-1	Westmont, IL	27			✓	970	Inducted into IBCA Hall of Fame (1987)
44	Paul Dawkins	F	1975-79	6-5	Saginaw, MI	26	✓	✓	✓	1,749	Fifth in the nation in scoring in 1979
50	Tim Dillon	F/C	1980-84	6-9	Franklin Grove, IL	26	✓		✓	1,559	NIU's First Academic All-American
40	Larry Gentry	F	1956-60	6-4	Clinton, IL	26			✓	1,306	Four-Time All-IIAC
44	Jerry Zielinski	F	1968-72	6-4	Hennepin, IL	25			✓	1,402	Drafted by ABA Dallas Chaparrals in April, 1972
44	Jim Smith	C	1967-69	6-7	Des Plaines, IL	24				967	First Huskie drafted by the NBA (Lakers)
12	Billy Harris	G	1969-73	6-2	Chicago, IL	24	✓			1,331	Titled: "The Best Playground Baller Ever"
10	George Bork	G	1960-63	6-1	Mt. Prospect, IL	23	✓		✓	1,114	First NIU football-basketball All-America pick.
12	Willie Hanson	G	1963-67	5-10	Mendota, IL	23			✓	1,063	Best Free Throw Shooter in NIU History
32	Rodney Davis	G	1984-88	6-3	Aurora, IL	22			✓	1,175	Called "complete package" by Northern Illinois Hall of Fame coach John McDougal.
NA	Reino Nori	F	1932-36	5-6	DeKalb, IL	22			✓	NA	Greatest NIU athlete during school's first 50 years.
52	Abe Booker	C	1958-61	6-5	Chicago, IL	21				595	Set NIU single-game (32) and season (331) rebound records
NA	Tuck Huntzicker	F	1925-28	5-10	DeKalb, IL	21				NA	Two-time team Captain
21	John Olson	F	1953-57	6-3	Chicago, IL	21			✓	1,192	First NIU player to reach 1,000-point career points
32	Bill Terwilliger	F	1938-41	6-2	DeKalb, IL	21				NA	Dubbed "Fastest Man on Campus"
21	Bobby Wood	G/F	1945-49	5-11	Rockford, IL	21				983	First NIU cager to play in the NBA.
NA	Charles "Wix" Garner	F	1916-21	5-9	DeKalb, IL	20			✓	NA	Two-sport All-IIAC Athlete
NA	Leland Strombom	G	1927-31	6-0	Sycamore, IL	20			✓	NA	Namesake of long-running Sycamore High School boys' basketball holiday tournament.
NA	Wes Concidine	F	1925-28	6-1	DeKalb, IL	19				NA	Earned 11 varsity letters in three sports
NA	Jim McKinzie	G	1950-53	6-0	DeKalb, IL	17			✓	579	Inducted into IBCA HOF in 2004
NA	John "Red" Pace	F	1929-33	6-3	Woodstock, IL	17			✓	NA	NBA official (1949–52) and NFL referee and crew chief (1953–70)
25	Dick Williams	F/C	1944-49	6-0	Kirkland, IL	17		✓	✓	NA	Competed in two collegiate spring sports literally at same time (baseball/track).
NA	Clarence "Boots" Cannon	G	1916-21	5-9	Shabonna Grove, IL	16				NA	Lettered in football, basketball, and baseball
25	Chris Coleman	G/F	1994-97	6-3	Buffalo Grove, IL	16			✓	1,080	MCC Tournament Most Valuable Player (1996)
34	Brad Waller	G/F	1982-85	6-4	Lombard, IL	16			✓	787	IBCA Hall-of-Fame (1991)
NA	Benny Westlake	F	1931-35	6-1	Elburn, IL	16			✓	NA	Mr. Northern Illinois Basketball in 1930s
NA	Roy "Flip" Allen	G/F	1935-39	6-0	Mount Morris, IL	15			✓	NA	Nicknamed "Flip" for his radical one-handed basketball jump shot
24	Harry Henigan	G	1942-49	5-11	Sycamore, IL	15			✓	NA	Known as "Harry The Horse" to Northern Illinois fans
16	Ollie Krahenbuhl	G	1939-42	5-7	Rochelle, IL	15			✓	NA	Described by George "Chick" Evans as "...the greatest punter I ever saw."

== Season-by-season records ==
Record table
Season	Coach	Overall	Conference	Standing	Postseason
John Keith (Independent) (1900–1902)
1900–01	John Keith	0–2			
1901–02	John Keith	6–2			
John Keith:		6–4			
Fred Charles (Independent) (1902–1903)
1902–03	Fred Charles	2–1			
Fred Charles:		2–1			
William Crocker (Independent) (1903–1904)
1903–04	William Crocker	3–7			
William Crocker:		3–7			
John Keith (Independent) (1904–1905)
1904–05	John Keith	7–3			
John Keith:		13–7			
Harry Sauthoff (Independent) (1905–1906)
1905–06	Harry Sauthoff	7–2			
Harry Sauthoff:		7–2			
Nelson A. Kellogg (Independent) (1906–1910)
1906–07	Nelson A. Kellogg	2–6			
1907–08	Nelson A. Kellogg	7–6			
1908–09	Nelson A. Kellogg	5–5			
1909–10	Nelson A. Kellogg	3–10			
Nelson A. Kellogg:		17–27			
William Wirtz (Independent) (1910–1918)
1910–11	William Wirtz	4–5			
1911–12	William Wirtz	6–4			
1912–13	William Wirtz	12–3			
1913–14	William Wirtz	9–4			
1914–15	William Wirtz	6–6			
1915–16	William Wirtz	7–3			
1916–17	William Wirtz	5–4			
1917–18	William Wirtz	8–2			
William Wirtz:		57–31			
Ralph Wagner (Independent) (1918–1920)
1918–19	Ralph Wagner	2–3			
1919–20	Ralph Wagner	11–7			
Ralph Wagner:		13–10			
Milo Oakland (IIAC) (1920–1923)
1920–21	Milo Oakland	13–4	2-2		
1921–22	Milo Oakland	6–6	4-3		
1922–23	Milo Oakland	6–8	5-6		
Milo Oakland:		25–18	11-11		
William Muir (IIAC) (1923–1926)
1923–24	William Muir	6–5	2-4		
1924–25	William Muir	13–4	2-2		
1925–26	William Muir	15–2	2-0		
William Muir:		34–11	6-6		
Roland Cowell (IIAC) (1926–1929)
1926–27	Roland Cowell	18–1			
1927–28	Roland Cowell	12–4	5-2		
1928–29	Roland Cowell	10–9	5-6		
Roland Cowell:		40–14	10-8		
Chick Evans (IIAC) (1929–1940)
1929–30	Chick Evans	11–6	7-4		
1930–31	Chick Evans	8–8	4-7		
1931–32	Chick Evans	13–6	7-5		
1932–33	Chick Evans	15–3	12-1	1st	
1933–34	Chick Evans	16–2	12-2	1st	
1934–35	Chick Evans	12–9	8-6	1st	
1935–36	Chick Evans	4–19	3-11		
1936–37	Chick Evans	12–9	7-7		
1937–38	Chick Evans	10–13	5-7		
1938–39	Chick Evans	12–6	8-3		
1939–40	Chick Evans	12–12	6-6		
Chick Evans:		125–93	79-59		
Ralph McKinzie (IIAC) (1940–1948)
1940–41	Ralph McKinzie	16–3	7-2	1st	
1941–42	Ralph McKinzie	11–9	3-4		
1942–43	Ralph McKinzie	9–8	4-4		
1943–44	Ralph McKinzie	7–7	3-4		
1944–45	Ralph McKinzie	15–1	7-1	1st	
1945–46	Ralph McKinzie	11–8	4-4		
1946–47	Ralph McKinzie	11–8	3-5		
1947–48	Ralph McKinzie	14–12	3-5		
Ralph McKinzie:		94–56	34-29		
Gene Fekete (IIAC) (1948–1949)
1948–49	Gene Fekete	10–11	2-6		
Gene Fekete:		10-11	2-6		
Gilbert Wilson (IIAC) (1949–1950)
1949–50	Gilbert Wilson	4–17	0-8	5th	
Gilbert Wilson:		4-17	0-8		
Gilman Hertz (IIAC) (1950–1954)
1950–51	Gilman Hertz	12–7	8-4	T-2nd	
1951–52	Gilman Hertz	5–16	1-11	6th	
1952–53	Gilman Hertz	13–7	6-6	4th	
1953–54	Gilman Hertz	5–14	2-10		
Gilman Hertz:		35-44	17-31		
William Healey (IIAC) (1954–1963)
1954–55	William Healey	9–11	4-8	T-6th	
1955–56	William Healey	5–14	3-9	6th	
1956–57	William Healey	7–13	6-6	T-2nd	
1957–58	William Healey	10–12	6-6		
1958–59	William Healey	11–11	4-8		
1959–60	William Healey	14–7	7-5	T-3rd	
1960–61	William Healey	14–8	7-5	T-3rd	
1961–62	William Healey	11–10	4-8	T-5th	
1962–63	William Healey	15–8	4-4	T-2nd	
William Healey:		96-94	45-59		
Ev Cochrane (IIAC) (1963–1966)
1963–64	Ev Cochrane	11–11	5-3	2nd	
1964–65	Ev Cochrane	12–10	5-3	T-2nd	
1965–66	Ev Cochrane	10–13	4-4	4th	
Ev Cochrane:		33-34	14-10		
Tom Jorgensen (Independent) (1966–1970)
1966–67	Tom Jorgensen	8–12			
1967–68	Tom Jorgensen	10–14			
1968–69	Tom Jorgensen	13–11			
1969–70	Tom Jorgensen	13–12			
Tom Jorgensen (Midwestern Conference) (1970–1972)
1970–71	Tom Jorgensen	13–10	4–4	3rd	
1971–72	Tom Jorgensen	21–4	7–1	1st	
Tom Jorgensen (Independent) (1973–1973)
1972–73	Tom Jorgensen	17–8			
Tom Jorgensen:		95–71	11-5		
Emory Luck (Independent) (1973–1975)
1973–74	Emory Luck	8–17			
1974–75	Emory Luck	8–15			
Emory Luck (MAC) (1975–1976)
1975–76	Emory Luck	5–21	2–14	9th	
Emory Luck:		21–53	2-14		
John McDougal (MAC) (1976–1986)
1976–77	John McDougal	13–14	10–6	4th	
1977–78	John McDougal	11–16	9–7	5th	
1978–79	John McDougal	14–13	8–8	5th	
1979–80	John McDougal	16–13	9–7	3rd	
1980–81	John McDougal	17–12	10–6	T–1st	
1981–82	John McDougal	16–14	9–7	3rd	NCAA Round of 48
1982–83	John McDougal	11–16	8–10	T-5th	
1983–84	John McDougal	12–15	9–9	5th	
1984–85	John McDougal	11–16	7–11	T–7th	
1985–86	John McDougal	15–12	10–8	4th	
John McDougal:		136–141	89-79		
Jim Rosborough (Independent) (1986–1989)
1986–87	Jim Rosborough	9–19			
1987–88	Jim Rosborough	8–20			
1988–89	Jim Rosborough	11–17			
Jim Rosborough:		28–56			
Jim Molinari (Independent) (1989–1990)
1989–90	Jim Molinari	17–11			
Jim Molinari (Mid-Con) (1990–1991)
1990–91	Jim Molinari	25–6	14–2	1st	NCAA Round of 64
Jim Molinari:		42–17	14-2		
Brian Hammel (Mid-Con) (1991–1994)
1991–92	Brian Hammel	11–17	7–9	T–6th	
1992–93	Brian Hammel	15–12	10–6	T–2nd	
1993–94	Brian Hammel	10–17	7–11	T–6th	
Brian Hammel (MCC) (1994–1997)
1994–95	Brian Hammel	19–10	7–8	7th	
1995–96	Brian Hammel	20–10	10–6	3rd	NCAA Round of 64
1996–97	Brian Hammel	12–15	6–10	T–6th	
Brian Hammel (MAC) (1997–2000)
1997–98	Brian Hammel	10–16	6–12	5th (West)	
1998–99	Brian Hammel	6–20	2–16	6th (West)	
1999–00	Brian Hammel	13–15	7–11	4th (West)	
2000–01	Brian Hammel	1–6	0–0		
Brian Hammel:		117–138	62-89		
Andy Greer (MAC) (2000–2001)
2000–01	Andy Greer	4–17	4–14	5th (West)	
Andy Greer:		4–17	4–14		
Rob Judson (MAC) (2001–2007)
2001–02	Rob Judson	12–16	8–10	4th (West)	
2002–03	Rob Judson	17–14	11–7	2nd (West)	
2003–04	Rob Judson	10–20	5–13	6th (West)	
2004–05	Rob Judson	11–17	7–11	5th (West)	
2005–06	Rob Judson	17–11	12–6	1st (West)	
2006–07	Rob Judson	7–23	4–12	6th (West)	
Rob Judson:		74–101	47-59		
Ricardo Patton (MAC) (2007–2011)
2007–08	Ricardo Patton	6–22	3–12	6th (West)	
2008–09	Ricardo Patton	10–20	5–11	5th (West)	
2009–10	Ricardo Patton	10–20	6–10	5th (West)	
2010–11	Ricardo Patton	9–21	5–11	4th (West)	
Ricardo Patton:		35–83	19–44		
Mark Montgomery (MAC) (2011–2021)
2011–12	Mark Montgomery	5–26	3–13	6th (West)	
2012–13	Mark Montgomery	5–25	3–13	6th (West)	
2013–14	Mark Montgomery	15–17	8–10	4th (West)	
2014–15	Mark Montgomery	14–16	8–10	T–4th (West)	
2015–16	Mark Montgomery	21–13	9–9	T–3rd (West)	Vegas 16 Quarterfinals
2016–17	Mark Montgomery	15–17	7–11	T–4th (West)	
2017–18	Mark Montgomery	13–19	6–12	6th (West)	
2018–19	Mark Montgomery	17–17	8–10	4th (West)	
2019–20	Mark Montgomery	18–13	11–7	T-1st (West)	
Mark Montgomery:		123–163 (.430)	63–95 (.399)		
2020–21	Lamar Chapman	3–16	2–12		
Rashon Burno (MAC) (2021–present)
2021–22	Rashon Burno	9–21	6–14	T-9th	
2022–23	Rashon Burno	13–19	9–9	T-6th	
2023–24	Rashon Burno	11-20	5-13	11th	
2024–25	Rashon Burno	6-25	2-16	12th	
Total:		1300–1362			
National champion Postseason invitational champion Conference regular season champion Conference regular season and conference tournament champion Division regular season champion Division regular season and conference tournament champion Conference tournament champion

- Source: NIU Men's Basketball Record Book

== Conference Tournament results ==
=== MAC tournament ===
The Huskies have won the MAC tournament once in 1982.

Year	Seed	Location	Round	Opponent	Result	NIU Head Coach
1980	3rd	DeKalb, IL; Ann Arbor, MI; Ann Arbor, MI	Quarterfinal; Semifinal; Consolation	(6) Miami (2) Bowling Green (5) Ball State	W 58–53; L 54–49; W 71–58	John McDougal
1981	5th	Bowling Green, OH; Ann Arbor, MI; Ann Arbor, MI	Quarterfinal; Semifinal; Championship	(4) Bowling Green (1) Western Michigan (2) Ball State	W 79–72; W 78–73; L 79–66	John McDougal
1982	3rd	DeKalb, IL; Ann Arbor, MI; Ann Arbor, MI	Quarterfinal; Semifinal; Championship	(6) Ohio (2) Bowling Green (1) Ball State	W 70–68; W 67–66; W 79–75 (OT)	John McDougal
1984	5th	Rockford, IL	Quarterfinal	(4) Toledo	L 73–68	John McDougal
1986	4th	Rockford, IL	Quarterfinal	(5) Toledo	L 82–79	John McDougal
2000	10th	Toledo, OH	First round	(7) Toledo	L 68–64	Brian Hammel
2001	11th	Muncie, IN	First round	(6) Ball State	L 89–57	Andy Greer
2002	9th	Huntington, WV	First round	(8) Marshall	L 97–93	Rob Judson
2003	4th	DeKalb, IL; Cleveland, OH; Cleveland, OH	First round Quarterfinal; Semifinal	(13) Buffalo (5) Western Michigan (1) Central Michigan	W 81–64; W 75–63; L 94–72	Rob Judson
2004	12th	Buffalo, NY	First round	(5) Buffalo	L 90–73	Rob Judson
2005	10th	Buffalo, NY	First round	(7) Buffalo	L 73–66	Rob Judson
2006	2nd	Cleveland, OH	Quarterfinal	(7) Toledo	L 78–77	Rob Judson
2007	11th	Cleveland, OH	First round	(6) Western Michigan	L 67–62	Rob Judson
2008	11th	Cleveland, OH	First round	(6) Central Michigan	L 83–71	Ricardo Patton
2009	11th	Cleveland, OH	First round	(6) Kent State	L 64–61	Ricardo Patton
2010	11th	Cleveland, OH	First round	(6) Eastern Michigan	L 65–59	Ricardo Patton
2011	10th	Bowling Green, OH	First round	(7) Bowling Green	L 74–54	Ricardo Patton
2012	12th	Ypsilanti, MI; Cleveland, OH	First round Second Round	(5) Eastern Michigan (8) Western Michigan	W 52–55; L 71-54	Mark Montgomery
2013	10th	Ypsilanti, MI	First round	(7) Eastern Michigan	L 45–44	Mark Montgomery
2014	7th	DeKalb, IL; Cleveland, OH	First round Second Round	(10) Bowling Green (6) Eastern Michigan	W 54–51; L 58–43	Mark Montgomery
2015	10th	Akron, OH	First round	(7) Akron	L 76–52	Mark Montgomery
2016	7th	DeKalb, IL; Cleveland, OH	First round Second Round	(10) Western Michigan (2) Ohio	W 56–50; L 79–62	Mark Montgomery
2017	9th	Ypsilanti, MI	First round	(8) Eastern Michigan	L 72-69	Mark Montgomery
2018	12th	Kent, OH	First round	(5) Kent State	L 61-59	Mark Montgomery
2019	7th	Dekalb, IL	First round	(10) Ohio	W 80-61	Mark Montgomery
2023	7th	Cleveland, OH	First round	(2) Kent State	L 76-57	Rashon Burno

- Source: MAC Men's Basketball Tournament History

=== The Summit League tournament ===
Year	Seed	Location	Round	Opponent	Result	NIU Head Coach
1991	1st	Green Bay, WI	Quarterfinal; Semifinal; Championship	(8) Illinois-Chicago (5) Northern Iowa (2) UW-Green Bay	W 77–52; W 76–63 (OT); L 56–39	Jim Molinari
1992	6th	Cleveland, OH	Quarterfinal	(3) Illinois-Chicago	L 80–66	Brian Hammel
1993	2nd	Dayton, OH	Quarterfinal	(7) Valparaiso	L 83–75	Brian Hammel
1994	7th	Rosemont, IL	Quarterfinal	(2) Illinois-Chicago	L 87–77	Brian Hammel

- Source: Summit League History

=== Horizon League tournament ===
The Huskies have won the Horizon League tournament once in 1996.

Year	Seed	Location	Round	Opponent	Result	NIU Head Coach
1995	7th	Dayton, OH	First round Quarterfinal; Semifinal	(10) Loyola (2) Illinois-Chicago (3) Green Bay	W 62–57; W 87–83; L 68–65	Brian Hammel
1996	3rd	Dayton, OH	Quarterfinal; Semifinal; Championship	(6) Milwaukee (7) Illinois-Chicago (5) Detroit	W 80–60; W 95–60; W 84–60	Brian Hammel
1997	6th	Dayton, OH	Quarterfinal	(3) Illinois-Chicago	L 76–65	Brian Hammel

- Source: Horizon League Records

== Postseason ==
=== NCAA tournament results ===
The Huskies have appeared in the NCAA tournament three times. Their overall record is 0–3.

Year	Seed	Round	Opponent	Result
1982	#12	Round of 48	#5 Kansas State	L 77–68
1991	#13	Round of 64	#4 St. John's	L 75–68
1996	#14	Round of 64	#3 Texas Tech	L 74–73

=== NCAA Division II Tournament results ===
The Huskies appeared in one NCAA Division II tournament. Their record is 0–2.

Year	Round	Opponent	Result
1958	Regional semifinals Regional 3rd-place game	Hope; St. Norbert	L 101–95; L 76–70

=== Vegas 16 results ===
The Huskies appeared in one Vegas 16. Their record is 0–1.

Year	Round	Opponent	Result
2016	Quarterfinals	UC Santa Barbara	L 70–63

- Rashon Burno – Head Coach
- Steve Christiansen – Assistant Coach
- Drew Gladstone - Assistant Coach
- Branden McDonald – Assistant Coach
- Matt Fleming – Director of Basketball Operations
- TBA – Assistant Director of Basketball Operations

== See also ==
- NIU Huskies women's basketball
