= Brian Hammel =

American basketball coach

Biographical details
- Born: March 23, 1953 (age 73)

Playing career
- 1971–1975: Bentley

Coaching career (HC unless noted)
- 1978–1984: Bentley
- 1984–1986: Iowa (asst.)
- 1986–1991: USC (asst.)
- 1991–2001: Northern Illinois

Brian Hammel (born March 23, 1953) is an American college basketball former coach.

He became the head coach at Northern Illinois University in 1991, coaching the team for over nine years before resigning midway through the 2000–2001 season because of exhaustion. The Huskies qualified for the NCAA tournament once in Hammel's tenure, reaching the 1996 event before losing in the first round to Texas Tech.

Prior to assuming the Northern Illinois job, Hammel had served as an assistant to George Raveling at Iowa from 1984 to 1986. He then moved with Raveling to Southern California and worked as an assistant coach from 1986 to 1991, taking an important role in the team's recruiting activities.

Hammel currently is the president of the Northridge Hospital Foundation, a position he has held since 2002. His younger brother the late Bert Hammel was also a basketball coach and the two played together at Bentley.
