= 2014 Dallas Cowboys season =

55th season in franchise history

- Owner: Jerry Jones
- General manager: Jerry Jones
- Head coach: Jason Garrett
- Offensive coordinator: Bill Callahan
- Defensive coordinator: Rod Marinelli
- Home stadium: AT&T Stadium

Results
- Record: 12–4
- Division place: 1st NFC East
- Playoffs: Won Wild Card Playoffs (vs. Lions) 24–20; Lost Divisional Playoffs (at Packers) 21–26
- All-Pros: RB DeMarco Murray (1st team); WR Dez Bryant (1st team); OT Tyron Smith (1st team); OG Zack Martin (1st team); QB Tony Romo (2nd team); C Travis Frederick (2nd team)
- Pro Bowlers: QB Tony Romo; RB DeMarco Murray; WR Dez Bryant; TE Jason Witten; T Tyron Smith; G Zack Martin; C Travis Frederick; LS L. P. Ladouceur

Uniform
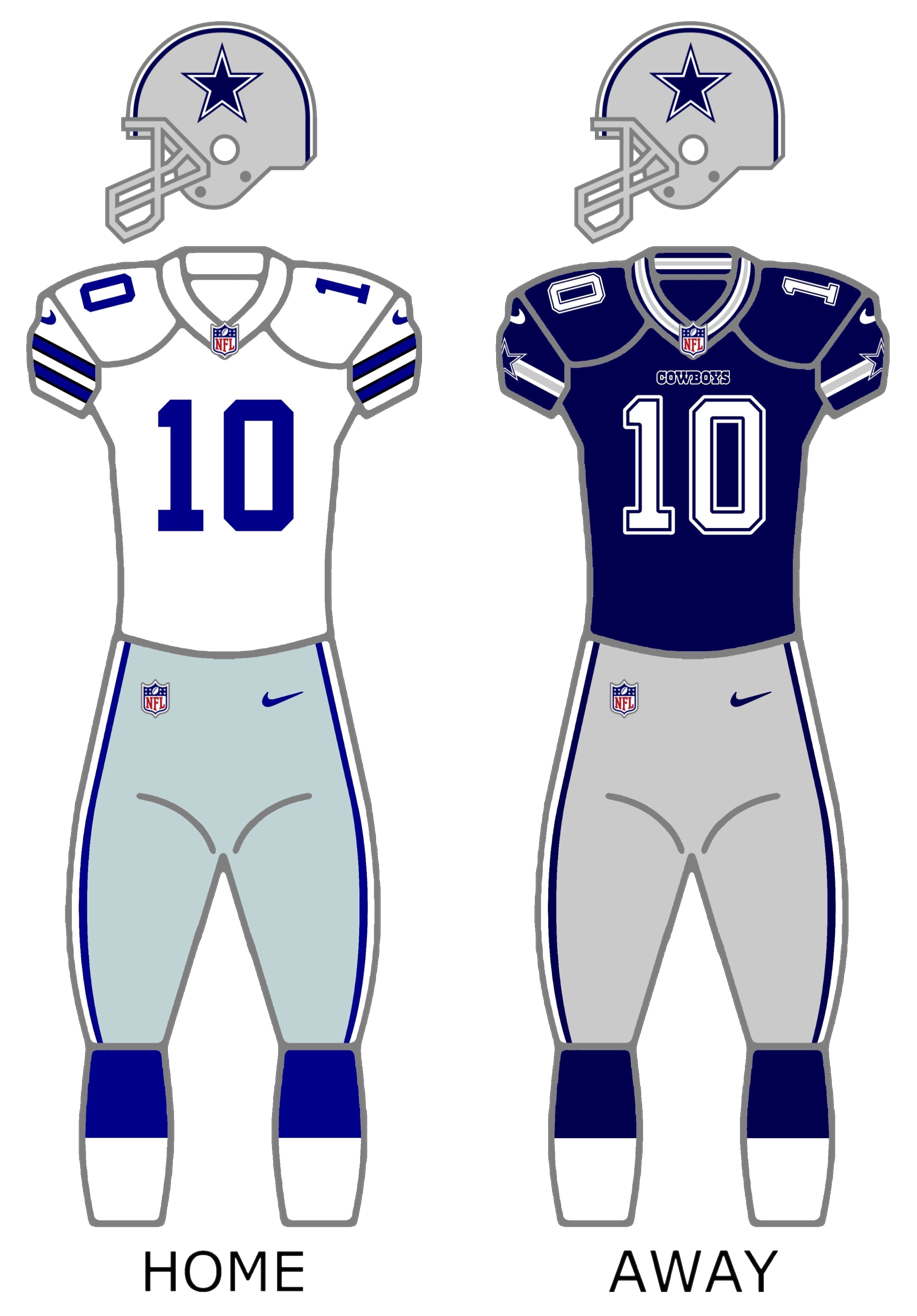

The 2014 season was the Dallas Cowboys' 55th in the National Football League (NFL), their sixth playing home games at AT&T Stadium and their fourth full season under head coach Jason Garrett.

The team improved on their 8–8 record from 2013, finishing 12–4 in a three-way tie for first place in the NFC; however, the Cowboys lost the conference record tiebreakers to both the Seattle Seahawks and Green Bay Packers and had to start their postseason in the wild card round, despite holding the head-to-head victory against the former. They started with a 24–20 win over the Detroit Lions before losing to the Packers 26–21 the following week, ending their season.

== Offseason ==
=== Players added ===
Pos.	Player	2013 Team
LB	Rolando McClain	Oakland Raiders
QB	Brandon Weeden	Cleveland Browns

=== Players lost ===
Pos.	Player	2014 Team
WR	Miles Austin	Cleveland Browns
QB	Kyle Orton	Buffalo Bills
DE	DeMarcus Ware	Denver Broncos

=== 2014 draft class ===
2014 Dallas Cowboys draft
Round	Pick	Player	Position	College	Notes
1	16	Zack Martin *	OG	Notre Dame	
2	34	DeMarcus Lawrence *	DE	Boise State	
4	119	Anthony Hitchens	LB	Iowa	
5	146	Devin Street	WR	Pittsburgh	
7	231	Ben Gardner	DE	Stanford	
7	238	Will Smith	LB	Texas Tech	
7	248	Ahmad Dixon	S	Baylor	Compensatory selection
7	251	Ken Bishop	DT	Northern Illinois	Compensatory selection
7	254	Terrance Mitchell	CB	Oregon	Compensatory selection
Made roster * Made at least one Pro Bowl during career

Notes

- The Cowboys traded their original second-round (No. 47 overall) and third-round (No. 78 overall) selections to the Washington Redskins in exchange for a second-round (No. 34 overall) selection.
- The Cowboys traded tight end Dante Rosario to the Chicago Bears for a seventh-round (No. 229 overall) selection.
- The Cowboys traded their fifth-round (No. 158 overall) and seventh-round (No. 229 overall, acquired from Chicago) selections to the Detroit Lions in exchange for a fifth-round (No. 146 overall) selection.
- The Cowboys traded their sixth-round (No. 193 overall) selection to the Kansas City Chiefs in exchange for linebacker Edgar Jones and a seventh-round (No. 238 overall) selection.

==== Undrafted free agents ====
Name	Position	College
Josh Aladenoye	Tackle	Illinois State
Chris Boyd	Wide receiver	Vanderbilt
Dartwan Bush	Defensive tackle	Texas Tech
Davon Coleman	Defensive tackle	Arizona State
Andre Cureton	Tackle	Cincinnati
J. C. Copeland	Fullback	LSU
Casey Kreiter	Long Snpper	Iowa
Ben Malena	Running back	Texas A&M
Cody Mandell	Punter	Alabama
Jordan Najvar	Tight end	Baylor
Tyler Patmon	Cornerback	Oklahoma State
Ronald Patrick	Guard	South Carolina
Dontavis Sapp	Linebacker	Tennessee
Keith Smith	Linebacker	San Jose State
Dustin Vaughan	Quarterback	West Texas A&M

== Offseason ==
After the departure of long time Cowboys favorites defensive end/linebacker DeMarcus Ware and defensive tackle Jason Hatcher to free agency, and a season-ending knee injury to middle linebacker Sean Lee during organized team activities in late May, the Dallas Cowboys were one of the most heavily admonished and second-guessed NFL franchises through the entire preseason and well into the regular season. Much of the criticism was in response to the Cowboys selecting Notre Dame offensive guard Zack Martin over the perceived Cowboys savior (Texas A&M quarterback Johnny Manziel) in the first round of the NFL draft. Even Cowboys owner Jerry Jones uncharacteristically downplayed expectations for the upcoming season during spring training, emphasizing to the media and fans that it might take a little more time for the Cowboys' young players to mature into a championship-caliber team.

== Regular season ==
Adding injury to the many insults hurled at Jerry Jones, quarterback Tony Romo and the Cowboys organization in general, Romo did not play well during two preseason starts after receiving only a small percentage of snaps throughout training camp, due to his continuing recovery from off-season surgery to repair a herniated intervertebral disc in his lower back. For these reasons, Romo and the Cowboys' passing offense struggled for the first two games of the regular season, causing many fans and media to declare the Dallas Cowboys as the absolute worst team in the league after their week 1 loss to the 49ers at AT&T Stadium. A humiliating turnover led to defeat for Dallas, which appeared to prove all the Cowboys' critics right, that Jerry Jones should have selected quarterback Johnny "Football" Manziel in the first round of the NFL 2014 draft to eventually replace Romo. But by season's end, not only would Romo have the highest passer rating (113.2) in the NFL for the 2014 regular season, but first-round pick offensive guard Zack Martin (whom the Cowboys had drafted instead of Manziel) would have a well deserved All-Pro season while establishing himself as a critical piece in what many considered to be the best offensive line in the NFL. The stout run-blocking of the Cowboys' offensive line would help two different Cowboys running backs (DeMarco Murray in 2014 and Ezekiel Elliott in 2016 and 2018) win 3 NFL rushing titles in 5 seasons.

Following a win against the Indianapolis Colts in Week 16 (and after the Philadelphia Eagles' loss to the Washington Redskins), the Cowboys clinched the NFC East title, putting them in the playoffs for the first time since 2009. The Cowboys finished 12–4, improving on their 8–8 record from 2013. For the season, the team was 8–0 on the road. Plenty of milestones were established by the 2014 Cowboys team, topped by DeMarco Murray's record-setting rushing season. The Cowboys defeated the Detroit Lions at home 24–20 in the wild-card round of the playoffs and advanced to the divisional round. However, the Green Bay Packers defeated them 26–21, handing the Cowboys their first road loss and ending their season.

== Staff ==
2014 Dallas Cowboys staff
Front office: Owner/president/general manager – Jerry Jones; COO/executive vice president/director of player personnel – Stephen Jones; Assistant director of player personnel – Will McClay; Director of football administration – Todd Williams; Assistant Director of pro scouting – Judd Garrett; Head coaches: Head coach – Jason Garrett; Offensive coaches: Pass game coordinator – Scott Linehan; Run game coordinator/offensive line – Bill Callahan; Quarterbacks – Wade Wilson; Running backs – Gary Brown; Wide receivers – Derek Dooley; Assistant Wide receivers – Kyle Valero; Tight ends – Mike Pope; Assistant offensive line – Frank Pollack; Senior coaching consultant/offensive consultant – Jimmy Robinson; Offensive assistant – Kevin Carberry	Defensive coaches: Defensive coordinator/defensive line – Rod Marinelli; Linebackers – Matt Eberflus; Secondary – Jerome Henderson; Assistant secondary – Joe Baker; Defensive assistant – Turner West; Defensive assistant/defensive line – Leon Lett; Defensive quality control/linebackers – Ben Bloom; Special teams coaches: Special teams Coordinator – Rich Bisaccia; Assistant special teams/kickers – Keith O'Quinn; Strength and conditioning: Strength and conditioning – Mike Woicik; Assistant Strength and conditioning – Brett Bech; Assistant Strength and conditioning – Kendall Smith

== Rosters ==
=== Opening preseason roster ===
2014 Dallas Cowboys opening preseason roster
Quarterbacks: 7 Caleb Hanie; 9 Tony Romo; 10 Dustin Vaughan; 3 Brandon Weeden; Running backs: 44 Tyler Clutts FB; 48 J. C. Copeland FB; 25 Lance Dunbar; 28 Ben Malena; 29 DeMarco Murray; 21 Joseph Randle; 34 Ryan Williams; Wide receivers: 11 Cole Beasley; 16 Tim Benford; 14 Chris Boyd; 81 Dezmon Briscoe; 88 Dez Bryant; 80 LaRon Byrd; 17 Dwayne Harris; 85 Jamar Newsome; 15 Devin Street; 83 Terrance Williams; Tight ends: 89 Gavin Escobar; 84 James Hanna; 87 Jordan Najvar; 86 Dallas Walker; 82 Jason Witten	Offensive linemen: 62 Josh AladenoyeT/G; 73 Mackenzy Bernadeau G; 64 Andre Cureton G; 72 Travis Frederick C; 68 Doug Free T; 65 Ronald Leary G; 70 Zack Martin G; 74 Uche Nwaneri G; 78 Jermey Parnell T; 67 Ronald Patrick C/G; 77 Tyron Smith T; 71 Wayne Tribue G; 75 Darrion Weems T; 61 John Wetzel T/G; Defensive linemen: 79 Ben Bass DT/DE; 66 Ken Bishop DT; 91 Kenneth Boatright DE; 70 Dartwan Bush DE/DT; 60 Davon Coleman DT; 98 Tyrone Crawford DE/DT; 71 Ben Gardner DE; 96 Nick Hayden DT; 90 DeMarcus Lawrence DE; 97 Terrell McClain DT; 69 Henry Melton DT; 92 Jeremy Mincey DE; 63 Adewale Ojomo DE; 95 Caesar Rayford DE; 99 George Selvie DE; 56 Martez Wilson DE	Linebackers: 54 Bruce Carter OLB; 52 Justin Durant OLB; 59 Anthony Hitchens MLB/OLB; 57 DeVonte Holloman MLB/OLB; 53 Cameron Lawrence OLB; 58 Orie Lemon OLB/MLB; 55 Rolando McClain MLB; 45 Dontavis Sapp OLB; 43 Keith Smith OLB/SS; 40 Will Smith OLB; 51 Kyle Wilber OLB/DE; Defensive backs: 39 Brandon Carr CB; 42 Barry Church FS; 24 Morris Claiborne CB; 36 Ahmad Dixon SS; 23 Jakar Hamilton FS; 38 Jeff Heath SS; 37 Matt Johnson FS; 41 Korey Lindsey CB; 30 Terrance Mitchell CB; 26 Sterling Moore CB; 35 Tyler Patmon CB; 32 Orlando Scandrick CB; 33 Ryan Smith SS; 47 Johnny Thomas FS; 20 B. W. Webb CB; 27 J. J. Wilcox SS; Special teams: 5 Dan Bailey K; 6 Chris Jones P; 49 Casey Kreiter LS; 91 L. P. Ladouceur LS; 2 Cody Mandell P	Reserve lists: -- Brian Clarke G (Waived/Injured); 50 Sean Lee MLB (IR); -- Darius Morris T/G (IR); 76 Amobi Okoye DT (Active/NF-Inj.); 31 Dashaun Phillips CB (Waived/Injured); 93 Anthony Spencer DE (Active/PUP); -- Chris Whaley DT (NF-Inj.); 90 active, 5 inactive

=== Week one roster ===
2014 Dallas Cowboys week one roster
Quarterbacks: 9 Tony Romo; 10 Dustin Vaughan; 3 Brandon Weeden; Running backs: 44 Tyler Clutts FB; 25 Lance Dunbar; 29 DeMarco Murray; 21 Joseph Randle; Wide receivers: 11 Cole Beasley; 88 Dez Bryant; 17 Dwayne Harris; 15 Devin Street; 83 Terrance Williams; Tight ends: 89 Gavin Escobar; 84 James Hanna; 82 Jason Witten	Offensive linemen: 73 Mackenzy Bernadeau G; 72 Travis Frederick C; 68 Doug Free T; 71 Donald Hawkins G/T; 65 Ronald Leary G; 70 Zack Martin G; 78 Jermey Parnell T; 77 Tyron Smith T; 75 Darrion Weems T; Defensive linemen: 66 Ken Bishop DT; 60 Davon Coleman DT; 58 Jack Crawford DE; 98 Tyrone Crawford DE/DT; 95 Lavar Edwards DE; 96 Nick Hayden DT; 97 Terrell McClain DT; 69 Henry Melton DT; 92 Jeremy Mincey DE; 99 George Selvie DE; 93 Anthony Spencer DE	Linebackers: 54 Bruce Carter OLB; 52 Justin Durant OLB; 59 Anthony Hitchens MLB/OLB; 53 Cameron Lawrence OLB; 55 Rolando McClain MLB; 56 Korey Toomer OLB/MLB; 51 Kyle Wilber OLB/DE; Defensive backs: 39 Brandon Carr CB; 42 Barry Church FS; 24 Morris Claiborne CB; 38 Jeff Heath SS; 26 Sterling Moore CB; 20 Tyler Patmon CB; 37 C. J. Spillman FS; 27 J. J. Wilcox SS; Special teams: 5 Dan Bailey K; 6 Chris Jones P; 91 L. P. Ladouceur LS	Reserve lists: -- Josh Brent DT (Susp.); -- Brian Clarke G (IR); 63 Ben Gardner DE (IR); 23 Jakar Hamilton FS (Susp.); -- DeVonte Holloman MLB/OLB (IR); 90 DeMarcus Lawrence DE (IR-DFR); 50 Sean Lee MLB (IR); -- Orie Lemon OLB/MLB (IR); 87 Jordan Najvar TE (IR); 76 Amobi Okoye DT (NF-Inj.); 32 Orlando Scandrick CB (Susp.); 64 Chris Whaley DT (NF-Inj.); Practice squad: 16 Tim Benford WR; 79 Kenneth Boatright DE; 67 Ronald Patrick C/G; 31 Micah Pellerin CB/FS; 46 Michael Sam DE; 57 Keith Smith OLB/SS; 28 Jemea Thomas FS/CB; 61 John Wetzel T/G; 47 Nikita Whitlock FB; 34 Ryan Williams RB; 53 active, 12 inactive, 10 practice squad

=== Final roster ===
2014 Dallas Cowboys final roster
Quarterbacks: 9 Tony Romo; 10 Dustin Vaughan; 3 Brandon Weeden; Running backs: 44 Tyler Clutts FB; 25 Lance Dunbar; 29 DeMarco Murray; 21 Joseph Randle; Wide receivers: 11 Cole Beasley; 88 Dez Bryant; 17 Dwayne Harris RS; 15 Devin Street; 83 Terrance Williams; Tight ends: 89 Gavin Escobar; 84 James Hanna; 82 Jason Witten	Offensive linemen: 73 Mackenzy Bernadeau G/C; 72 Travis Frederick C; 68 Doug Free T; 71 Donald Hawkins G/T; 67 Tony Hills T; 65 Ronald Leary G; 70 Zack Martin G; 78 Jermey Parnell T; 77 Tyron Smith T; Defensive linemen: 79 Kenneth Boatright DE; 95 Josh Brent DT; 98 Tyrone Crawford DE/DT; 96 Nick Hayden DT; 90 DeMarcus Lawrence DE; 97 Terrell McClain DT; 69 Henry Melton DT; 92 Jeremy Mincey DE; 99 George Selvie DE; 93 Anthony Spencer DE	Linebackers: 54 Bruce Carter OLB; 59 Anthony Hitchens MLB/OLB; 53 Cameron Lawrence OLB; 55 Rolando McClain MLB; 57 Keith Smith OLB; 56 Dekoda Watson OLB; 51 Kyle Wilber OLB; Defensive backs: 39 Brandon Carr CB; 42 Barry Church SS; 23 Jakar Hamilton FS; 38 Jeff Heath SS; 26 Sterling Moore CB; 20 Tyler Patmon CB; 32 Orlando Scandrick CB; 37 C. J. Spillman FS; 27 J. J. Wilcox FS; Special teams: 5 Dan Bailey K; 6 Chris Jones P; 91 L. P. Ladouceur LS	Reserve lists: 24 Morris Claiborne CB (IR); 58 Jack Crawford DE (IR); 52 Justin Durant OLB (IR); 63 Ben Gardner DE (IR); -- DeVonte Holloman LB (IR); 50 Sean Lee MLB (IR); 76 Amobi Okoye DT (NF-Ill.); 75 Darrion Weems T (IR); -- Chris Whaley DT (NF-Inj.); Practice squad: 48 Mister Alexander LB; 66 Ken Bishop DT; 16 Chris Boyd WR; 60 Davon Coleman DT; -- Troy Davis LB (IR); 14 Reggie Dunn WR; 64 Lavar Edwards DE (IR); 31 Micah Pellerin CB; 40 Will Smith LB; 28 Robert Steeples CB; 61 John Wetzel G; 34 Ryan Williams RB; 53 active, 11 inactive, 10 practice squad

== Preseason ==
Week	Date	Opponent	Result	Record	Game site	NFL.com recap
1	August 7	at San Diego Chargers	L 7–27	0–1	Qualcomm Stadium	Recap
2	August 16	Baltimore Ravens	L 30–37	0–2	AT&T Stadium	Recap
3	August 23	at Miami Dolphins	L 20–25	0–3	Sun Life Stadium	Recap
4	August 28	Denver Broncos	L 3–27	0–4	AT&T Stadium	Recap

== Regular season ==
=== Schedule ===
Week	Date	Opponent	Result	Record	Game site	NFL.com recap
1	September 7	San Francisco 49ers	**L** 17–28	0–1	AT&T Stadium	Recap
2	September 14	at Tennessee Titans	**W** 26–10	1–1	LP Field	Recap
3	September 21	at St. Louis Rams	**W** 34–31	2–1	Edward Jones Dome	Recap
4	September 28	New Orleans Saints	**W** 38–17	3–1	AT&T Stadium	Recap
5	October 5	Houston Texans	**W** 20–17 (OT)	4–1	AT&T Stadium	Recap
6	October 12	at Seattle Seahawks	**W** 30–23	5–1	CenturyLink Field	Recap
7	October 19	**New York Giants**	**W** 31–21	6–1	AT&T Stadium	Recap
8	October 27	**Washington Redskins**	**L** 17–20 (OT)	6–2	AT&T Stadium	Recap
9	November 2	Arizona Cardinals	**L** 17–28	6–3	AT&T Stadium	Recap
10	November 9	at Jacksonville Jaguars	**W** 31–17	7–3	(United Kingdom) Wembley Stadium (London, England)	Recap
11	Bye					
12	November 23	at **New York Giants**	**W** 31–28	8–3	MetLife Stadium	Recap
13	November 27	**Philadelphia Eagles**	**L** 10–33	8–4	AT&T Stadium	Recap
14	December 4	at Chicago Bears	**W** 41–28	9–4	Soldier Field	Recap
15	December 14	at **Philadelphia Eagles**	**W** 38–27	10–4	Lincoln Financial Field	Recap
16	December 21	Indianapolis Colts	**W** 42–7	11–4	AT&T Stadium	Recap
17	December 28	at **Washington Redskins**	**W** 44–17	12–4	FedExField	Recap

Note: Intra-division opponents are in bold text.

=== Game summaries ===
==== Week 1: vs. San Francisco 49ers ====
Week One: San Francisco 49ers at Dallas Cowboys – Game summary

Quarter	1	2	3	4	Total
**49ers**	21	7	0	0	**28**
Cowboys	3	0	7	7	**17**

at AT&T Stadium, Arlington, Texas

- Date: September 7, 2014
- Game time: 3:25 p.m. CDT
- Game weather: Played indoors (retractable roof closed)
- Game attendance: 91,174
- Referee: Terry McAulay
- TV announcers (Fox): Joe Buck, Troy Aikman and Erin Andrews
- Recap, Gamebook

Game information

**First quarter**

- SF – Chris Culliver 35-yard fumble return (Phil Dawson kick), 14:06. 49ers 7–0.
- DAL – Dan Bailey 29-yard field goal, 7:22. 49ers 7–3. **Drive: 11 plays, 69 yards, 6:44.**
- SF – Vernon Davis 29-yard pass from Colin Kaepernick (Phil Dawson kick), 5:54. 49ers 14–3. **Drive: 3 plays, 80 yards, 1:28.**
- SF – Vernon Davis 2-yard pass from Colin Kaepernick (Phil Dawson kick), 4:25. 49ers 21–3. **Drive: 1 play, 2 yards, 0:06.**

**Second quarter**

- SF – Carlos Hyde 4-yard run (Phil Dawson kick), 0:39. 49ers 28–3. **Drive: 9 plays, 64 yards, 3:00.**

**Third quarter**

- DAL – DeMarco Murray 2-yard run (Dan Bailey kick), 0:29. 49ers 28–10. **Drive: 14 plays, 87 yards, 6:56.**

**Fourth quarter**

- DAL – Terrance Williams 2-yard pass from Tony Romo (Dan Bailey kick), 1:52. 49ers 28–17. **Drive: 11 plays, 73 yards, 3:45.**

**Top Passers**

- SF – Colin Kaepernick – 16/23, 201 yards, 2 TD
- DAL – Tony Romo – 23/37, 281 yards, TD, 3 INT

**Top Rushers**

- SF – Frank Gore – 16 rushes, 66 yards
- DAL – DeMarco Murray – 22 rushes, 118 yards, TD

**Top Receivers**

- SF – Anquan Boldin – 8 receptions, 99 yards
- DAL – Dwayne Harris – 1 reception, 56 yards

===== Game notes =====
The Cowboys were 16–17–1 against the San Francisco 49ers from 1960 to 2014. Since then, Dallas won the next three meetings, in 2016, 2017, and 2020. But the Cowboys would lose to the 49ers in the 2021 wild-card round of the playoffs.

==== Week 2: at Tennessee Titans ====
Week Two: Dallas Cowboys at Tennessee Titans – Game summary

Quarter	1	2	3	4	Total
**Cowboys**	3	13	7	3	**26**
Titans	0	0	10	0	**10**

at LP Field, Nashville, Tennessee

- Date: September 14
- Game time: 12:00 p.m. CDT
- Game weather: 77 °F (25 °C), (Sunny)
- Game attendance: 69,143
- Referee: Walt Coleman
- TV announcers (Fox): Joe Buck, Troy Aikman and Erin Andrews
- Recap, Gamebook

Game information

**First quarter**

- DAL – Dan Bailey 48-yard field goal, 0:13. Cowboys 3–0. **Drive: 11 plays, 50 yards, 6:59.**

**Second quarter**

- DAL – DeMarco Murray 3-yard run (Dan Bailey kick), 12:54. Cowboys 10–0. **Drive: 4 plays, 40 yards, 1:49.**
- DAL – Dan Bailey 44-yard field goal, 1:02. Cowboys 13–0. **Drive: 8 plays, 34 yards, 2:54.**
- DAL – Dan Bailey 51-yard field goal, 0:04. Cowboys 16–0. **Drive: 4 plays, 15 yards, 0:19.**

**Third quarter**

- TEN – Ryan Succop 47-yard field goal, 10:57. Cowboys 16–3. **Drive: 9 plays, 63 yards, 4:03.**
- TEN – Delanie Walker 61-yard pass from Jake Locker (Ryan Succop kick), 7:45. Cowboys 16–10. **Drive: 3 plays, 68 yards, 1:25.**
- DAL – Dez Bryant 3-yard pass from Tony Romo (Dan Bailey kick), 2:09. Cowboys 23–10. **Drive: 12 plays, 80 yards, 5:36.**

**Fourth quarter**

- DAL – Dan Bailey 48-yard field goal, 8:15. Cowboys 26–10. **Drive: 11 plays, 38 yards, 6:08.**

**Top passers**

- DAL – Tony Romo – 19/29, 176 yards, TD
- TEN – Jake Locker – 18/34, 234 yards, TD, 2 INT

**Top rushers**

- DAL – DeMarco Murray – 29 rushes, 167 yards, TD
- TEN – Shonn Greene – 5 rushes, 40 yards

**Top receivers**

- DAL – Dez Bryant – 10 receptions, 103 yards, TD
- TEN – Delanie Walker – 10 receptions, 142 yards, TD

===== Game notes =====
The win against the Titans meant that the Cowboys wouldn't start 0–2, which they hadn't done since 2010, when Wade Phillips was fired midway through the season and Jason Garrett was promoted to head coach.

==== Week 3: at St. Louis Rams ====
Week Three: Dallas Cowboys at St. Louis Rams – Game summary

Quarter	1	2	3	4	Total
**Cowboys**	0	10	10	14	**34**
Rams	7	14	0	10	**31**

at Edward Jones Dome, St. Louis, Missouri

- Date: September 21
- Game time: 12:00 p.m. CDT
- Game weather: Played indoors (dome stadium)
- Game attendance: 58,739
- Referee: Clete Blakeman
- TV announcers (Fox): Kenny Albert, Daryl Johnston and Tony Siragusa
- Recap, Gamebook

Game information

First quarter

- Rams – Lance Kendricks 1 yard pass from Austin Davis, (Greg Zuerlein kick), 6:15 (Rams 7–0)

Second quarter

- Rams – Brian Quick 51 yard pass from Austin Davis, (Greg Zuerlein kick), 15:00 (Rams 14–0)
- Rams – Janoris Jenkins 25 yard interception return (Greg Zuerlein kick), 6:13 (Rams 21–0)
- DAL – DeMarco Murray 1 yard rush (Dan Bailey kick), 2:10 (Rams 21–7)
- DAL – Dan Bailey 29 yard field goal, 0:05 (Rams 21–10)

Third quarter

- DAL – Dez Bryant 68 yard pass from Tony Romo (Dan Bailey kick), 12:58 (Rams 21–17)
- DAL – Dan Bailey 40 yard field goal, 2:49 (Rams 21–20)

Fourth quarter

- Rams – Greg Zuerlein 28 yard field goal, 13:31 (Rams 24–20)
- DAL – Terrance Williams 12 yard pass from Tony Romo, (Dan Bailey kick), 6:21 (Dal 27–24)
- DAL – Bruce Carter 25 yard interception return (Dan Bailey kick), 6:06 (Dal 34–24)
- Rams – Austin Pettis 4 yard pass from Austin Davis, (Greg Zuerlein kick), 2:41 (Dal 34–31)

Top passers

- DAL –Tony Romo, 18/23, 214 Yds, 2 TD, 1 INT, 68 Lng
- STL –Austin Davis, 30/42, 327 Yds, 3 TD, 2 INT, 52 Lng

Top rushers

- DAL –DeMarco Murray, 24 Car, 100 Yds, 1 TD, 44 Lng
- STL –Zac Stacy, 12 Car, 67 Yds, 0 TD, 16 Lng

Top receivers

- DAL –Dez Bryant, 6 Rec, 89 Yds, 1 TD, 68 Lng
- STL –Jared Cook, 7 Rec, 75 Yds, 0 TD, 18 Lng

===== Game notes =====
The Cowboys' 21-point comeback win against the Rams was a new Cowboys' record for the largest point deficit that a Cowboys team had come back from and won in a game that didn't go into overtime. It was the third 21-point comeback victory in Cowboys' history. The other two came in overtime, in 1984 against the New Orleans Saints and 1999 against the Washington Redskins.

The Rams' 2nd-quarter 21-point lead was the second-largest lead blown by the Rams. The biggest deficit overcome by a Rams opponent was 23 points by the Green Bay Packers in 1982, and the Denver Broncos had a 21-point rally in 1982.

Cowboys kicker Dan Bailey set a franchise record by making his 28th field goal in a row on a 40-yarder in the third quarter. Cowboys kicker Chris Boniol hit 27 straight field goals in 1996.

==== Week 4: vs. New Orleans Saints ====
Week Four: New Orleans Saints at Dallas Cowboys – Game summary

Quarter	1	2	3	4	Total
Saints	0	0	3	14	**17**
**Cowboys**	7	17	7	7	**38**

at AT&T Stadium, Arlington, Texas

- Date: September 28
- Game time: 7:30 p.m. CDT
- Game weather: Played indoors (retractable roof closed)
- Game attendance: 91,176
- Referee: Gene Steratore
- TV announcers (NBC): Al Michaels, Cris Collinsworth and Michele Tafoya
- Recap, Gamebook

Game information

First quarter

- DAL – Terrance Williams 6 yard pass from Tony Romo (Dan Bailey kick), 7:57 (Dal 7–0)

Second quarter

- DAL – Dan Bailey 51 yard field goal, 5:43 (Dal 10–0)
- DAL – DeMarco Murray 15 yard rush (Dan Bailey kick), 4:09 (Dal 17–0)
- DAL – Terrance Williams 23 yard pass from Tony Romo (Dan Bailey kick), 0:24 (Dal 24–0)

Third quarter

- NO – Shayne Graham 30 yard field goal, 11:14 (Dal 24–3)
- DAL – DeMarco Murray 28 yard rush (Dan Bailey kick), 6:53 (Dal 31–3)

Fourth quarter

- NO – Josh Hill 12 yard pass from Drew Brees (Shayne Graham kick), 13:43 (Dal 31–10)
- NO – Jimmy Graham 13 yard pass from Drew Brees (Shayne Graham kick), 9:56 (Dal 31–17)
- DAL – Dez Bryant 18 yard pass from Tony Romo (Dan Bailey kick), 3:40 (Dal 38–17)

Top passers

- NO – Drew Brees, 32/44, 340 Yds, 2 TD, 1 INT, 46 Lng
- DAL – Tony Romo, 22/29, 262 Yds, 3 TD, 0 INT, 24 Lng

Top rushers

- NO – Khiry Robinson, 8 Car, 87 Yds, 0 TD, 62 Lng
- DAL – DeMarco Murray, 24 Car, 149 Yds, 2 TD, 28 Lng
- DAL – Tony Romo, 6 Car, 20 Yds, 0 TD, 21 Lng

Top receivers

- NO – Jimmy Graham 8 Rec, 86 Yds, 1 TD, 17 Lng
- NO – Travaris Cadet 6 Rec, 59 Yds, 0 TD, 31 Lng
- DAL – Terrance Williams 6 Rec, 77 Yds, 2 TD, 23 Lng
- DAL – Dez Bryant 3 Rec, 44 Yds, 1 TD, 18 Lng

Top tacklers

- NO – Curtis Lofton 11 Combined Tackles, 9 Total and 2 Assists
- DAL – Orlando Scandrick 7 Combined Tackles, 6 Total and 1 Assist

===== Game notes =====
After 4 weeks of regular season play, DeMarco Murray found himself in elite company with his 149-yard 2 touchdown performance against the Saints, joining Jim Brown, O. J. Simpson and former Cowboy Emmitt Smith as the only players to rush for 100 or more yards, while scoring a touchdown, in the first four games of a season.

The Cowboys' three-game winning streak was their first since the 2012 season.

==== Week 5: vs. Houston Texans ====
Week Five: Houston Texans at Dallas Cowboys – Game summary

Quarter	1	2	3	4	OT	Total
Texans	0	0	7	10	0	**17**
**Cowboys**	0	3	7	7	3	**20**

at AT&T Stadium, Arlington, Texas

- Date: October 5
- Game time: 12:00 p.m. CDT
- Game weather: Played indoors (retractable roof closed)
- Game attendance: 91,159
- Referee: Pete Morelli
- TV announcers (CBS): Ian Eagle, Dan Fouts and Jenny Dell
- Recap, Gamebook

Game information

First quarter

- No Score

Second quarter

- DAL – Dan Bailey 33 yard field goal, 0:16 (Dal 3–0)

Third quarter

- HOU – Arian Foster 15 yard rush (Randy Bullock kick), 8:56 (Hou 7–3)
- DAL – Terrance Williams 43 yard pass from Tony Romo (Dan Bailey kick), 6:18 (Dal 10–7)

Fourth quarter

- DAL – Dez Bryant 2 yard pass from Tony Romo (Dan Bailey kick), 9:50 (Dal 17–7)
- HOU – Randy Bullock 29 yard field goal, 2:31 (Dal 17–10)
- HOU – Arian Foster 15 yard rush (Randy Bullock kick), 0:45 (Tie 17–17)

Overtime

- DAL – Dan Bailey 49 yard field goal, 8:37 (Dal 20–17)

Top passers

- HOU – Ryan Fitzpatrick, 16/25, 154 Yds, 0 TD, 1 INT, 20 Lng
- DAL – Tony Romo, 28/41, 324 Yds, 2 TD, 1 INT, 43 Lng

Top rushers

- HOU – Arian Foster, 23 Car, 157 Yds, 2 TD, 33 Lng
- DAL – DeMarco Murray, 31 Car, 136 Yds, 0 TD, 17 Lng

Top receivers

- HOU – DeAndre Hopkins, 6 Rec, 63 Yds, 0 TD, 19 Lng
- DAL – Dez Bryant 9 Rec, 85 Yds, 1 TD, 37 Lng

Top tacklers

- HOU –
- DAL –

===== Game notes =====
After hauling in a 34-yard completion from Tony Romo mid-way through the third quarter, Cowboys TE Jason Witten surpassed 10,000 receiving yards for his career, making him only the 3rd tight end in NFL history to do so. Witten's 59-yard day against the Texans left him just 46 yards shy of the No. 2 position held at the time by Shannon Sharpe with 10,060 career receiving yards. Tony Gonzalez led all tight ends in career receiving yards at 15,127.

The Cowboys' four-game winning streak was their first since 2011, and their best start since 2008.

==== Week 6: at Seattle Seahawks ====
Week Six: Dallas Cowboys at Seattle Seahawks – Game summary

Quarter	1	2	3	4	Total
**Cowboys**	7	10	3	10	**30**
Seahawks	10	0	10	3	**23**

at CenturyLink Field, Seattle, Washington

- Date: October 12
- Game time: 3:25 p.m. CDT/1:25 p.m. PDT
- Game weather: 60 °F (16 °C), partly cloudy
- Game attendance: 68,432
- Referee: Bill Leavy
- TV announcers (Fox): Thom Brennaman, Troy Aikman and Charissa Thompson
- Recap, Gamebook

Game information

First quarter

- SEA – Steven Hauschka 33 yard field goal, 10:10 (SEA 3–0)
- SEA – Mike Morgan 25 yard blocked punt return (Steven Hauschka kick), 7:19 (SEA 10–0)
- DAL – Gavin Escobar 2 yard pass from Tony Romo (Dan Bailey kick), 2:38 (SEA 10–7)

Second quarter

- DAL – Dan Bailey 42 yard field goal, 5:20 (TIE 10–10)
- DAL – Jason Witten 3 yard pass from Tony Romo (Dan Bailey kick), 0:24 (Dal 17–10)

Third quarter

- SEA – Russell Wilson 9 yard rush (Steven Hauschka kick), 6:20 (TIE 17–17)
- SEA – Steven Hauschka 33 yard field goal, 3:25 (SEA 20–17)
- DAL – Dan Bailey 56 yard field goal, 1:08 (TIE 20–20)

Fourth quarter

- SEA – Steven Hauschka 48 yard field goal, 8:21 (SEA 23–20)
- DAL – DeMarco Murray 15 yard rush (Dan Bailey kick), 3:23 (DAL 27–23)
- DAL – Dan Bailey 31 yard field goal, 1:12 (DAL 30–23)

Top passers

- DAL – Tony Romo, 21/32, 250 Yds, 2 TD, 0 INT, 47 Lng
- SEA – Russell Wilson, 14/28, 126 Yds, 0 TD, 1 INT, 53 Lng

Top rushers

- DAL – DeMarco Murray, 29 Car, 115 Yds, 1 TD, 25 Lng
- SEA – Marshawn Lynch, 10 Car, 61 Yds, 0 TD, 32 Lng

Top receivers

- DAL – Dez Bryant 4 Rec, 63 Yds, 0 TD, 23 Lng
- DAL – Terrance Williams 2 Rec, 70 Yds, 0 TD, 47 Lng
- DAL – Jason Witten 2 Rec, 24 Yds, 1 TD, 21 Lng
- SEA – Jermaine Kearse 3 Rec, 62 Yds, 0 TD, 53 Lng
- SEA – Doug Baldwin 2 Rec, 32 Yds, 0 TD, 20 Lng
- SEA – Luke Willson 2 Rec, 11 Yds, 0 TD, 10 Lng

Top tacklers

- DAL –
- SEA –

===== Game notes =====
DeMarco Murray's 115-yard rushing day against the Seahawks made him only the second running back in NFL history – next to Jim Brown – to rush for 100 yards in the first 6 games of the season. Jim Brown did it for the first six games of the 1958 season.

With the victory, the Cowboys improved to 5–1 on the season, their best record since the 2007 campaign.

Dallas became the first team outside the NFC West to win in Seattle since 2011.

Five days after Seattle's loss at home to the Cowboys, the Seahawks traded WR Percy Harvin to the New York Jets for an undisclosed draft selection. It was reported that the surprisingly sudden move by Seattle was due in large part to Harvin refusing to return to the game in the fourth quarter. While Harvin had a 46-yard kickoff return, his total yardage for rushing and receiving was −1 yard against the Cowboys.

Dan Bailey's 3rd quarter 42-yard field goal made him 100-for-110 on field goals for his career, making him the most accurate kicker in NFL history with a FG percentage of 90.826% from 2011 to 2014. Mike Vanderjagt was second in all-time NFL accuracy with a FG percentage of 86.466% from 1998 to 2006. Stephen Gostkowski was a close third in NFL accuracy with a FG percentage of 86.328% from 2006 to 2014.

==== Week 7: vs. New York Giants ====
Week Seven: New York Giants at Dallas Cowboys – Game summary

Quarter	1	2	3	4	Total
Giants	0	14	0	7	**21**
**Cowboys**	7	7	7	10	**31**

at AT&T Stadium, Arlington, Texas

- Date: October 19
- Game time: 3:25 p.m. CDT
- Game weather: Played indoors (retractable roof closed)
- Game attendance: 91,028
- Referee: Jerome Boger
- TV announcers (Fox): Thom Brennaman, Troy Aikman and Charissa Thompson
- Recap, Gamebook

Game information

First quarter

- DAL – Gavin Escobar 15 yard pass from Tony Romo (Dan Bailey kick), 5:13 (DAL 7–0)

Second quarter

- NYG – Odell Beckham Jr. 9 yard pass from Eli Manning (Josh Brown kick), 11:31 (Tie 7–7)
- NYG – Daniel Fells 27 yard pass from Eli Manning (Josh Brown kick), 8:00 (NYG 14–7)
- DAL – Terrance Williams 18 yard pass from Tony Romo (Dan Bailey kick), 2:27 (Tie 14–14)

Third quarter

- DAL – Gavin Escobar 26 yard pass from Tony Romo (Dan Bailey kick), 6:22 (DAL 21–14)

Fourth quarter

- DAL – DeMarco Murray 1 yard rush (Dan Bailey kick), 9:17 (DAL 28–14)
- NYG – Odell Beckham Jr. 9 yard pass from Eli Manning (Josh Brown kick), 5:34 (DAL 28–21)
- DAL – Dan Bailey 49 yard field goal, 1:04 (DAL 31–21)

Top passers

- NYG – Eli Manning, 21/33, 248 Yds, 3 TD, 0 INT, 27 Lng
- DAL – Tony Romo, 17/23, 279 Yds, 3 TD, 1 INT, 44 Lng

Top rushers

- NYG – Andre Williams, 18 Car, 51 Yds, 0 TD, 22 Lng
- NYG – Peyton Hillis, 6 Car, 29 Yds, 0 TD, 10 Lng
- DAL – DeMarco Murray, 28 Car, 128 Yds, 1 TD, 21 Lng
- DAL – Lance Dunbar, 3 Car, 16 Yds, 0 TD, 13 Lng

Top receivers

- NYG – Larry Donnell 7 Rec, 90 Yds, 0 TD, 21 Lng
- NYG – Rueben Randle 6 Rec, 74 Yds, 0 TD, 17 Lng
- NYG – Odell Beckham Jr. 4 Rec, 34 Yds, 2 TD, 11 Lng
- DAL – Dez Bryant 9 Rec, 151 Yds, 0 TD, 44 Lng
- DAL – Gavin Escobar 3 Rec, 65 Yds, 2 TD, 26 Lng
- DAL – Terrance Williams 1 Rec, 18 Yds, 1 TD, 18 Lng

Top tacklers

- NYG –
- DAL –

===== Game notes =====
DeMarco Murray continued his season by rushing for his seventh straight 100-yard game to start a season, breaking the record held by the great Jim Brown.

With the win over the Giants, the Cowboys improved to a league-best 6–1 on the season, moving into sole possession of first place in the NFC East due to the Eagles having a bye week. This was the Cowboys' best start to a season since 2007 when they also were 6–1 after the first 7 games.

==== Week 8: vs. Washington Redskins ====
Week Eight: Washington Redskins at Dallas Cowboys – Game summary

Quarter	1	2	3	4	OT	Total
**Redskins**	3	0	7	7	3	**20**
Cowboys	0	7	3	7	0	**17**

at AT&T Stadium, Arlington, Texas

- Date: October 27
- Game time: 7:30 p.m. CDT
- Game weather: Played indoors (retractable roof closed)
- Game attendance: 87,055
- Referee: Tony Corrente
- TV announcers (ESPN): Mike Tirico, Jon Gruden and Lisa Salters
- Recap, Gamebook

Game information

First quarter

- WAS – Kai Forbath 44-yard field goal, 09:52 (WAS 3–0)

Second quarter

- DAL – Dez Bryant 5-yard pass from Tony Romo, Dan Bailey kick, 04:52 (DAL 7–3)

Third quarter

- WAS – Alfred Morris 5-yard run, Kai Forbath kick, 09:56 (WAS 10–7)
- DAL – Dan Bailey 21-yard field goal, 04:07 (Tied 10–10)

Fourth quarter

- WAS – Colt McCoy 7-yard run, Kai Forbath kick, 13:44 (WAS 17–10)
- DAL – Jason Witten 25-yard pass from Brandon Weeden, 09:36 (Tied 17–17)

Overtime

- WAS – Kai Forbath 40-yard field goal, 09:48 (WAS 20–17)

Top passers

- WAS – Colt McCoy, 25/30, 299 Yds, 0 TD, 1 INT, 49 Lng
- DAL – Tony Romo, 17/28, 209 Yds, 1 TD, 0 INT, 34 Lng
- DAL – Brandon Weeden, 4/6, 69 Yds, 1 TD, 0 INT, 25 Lng

Top rushers

- WAS – Alfred Morris, 18 Car, 73 Yds, 1 TD, 29 Lng
- DAL – DeMarco Murray, 19 Car, 141 Yds, 0 TD, 51 Lng

Top receivers

- WAS – DeSean Jackson,6 Rec, 136 Yds, 0 TD, 49 Lng
- WAS – Jordan Reed,7 Rec, 40 Yds, 0 TD, 16 Lng
- WAS – Pierre Garçon,4 Rec, 47 Yds, 0 TD, 23 Lng
- DAL – Jason Witten, 5 Rec, 70 Yds, 1 TD, 25 Lng
- DAL – Terrance Williams, 6 Rec, 69 Yds, 0 TD, 18 Lng
- DAL – Dez Bryant, 3 Rec, 30 Yds, 1 TD, 20 Lng

Top tacklers

- WAS –
- DAL –

===== Game notes =====
Colt McCoy completed 83.3 percent of his passes (25–30 for 299 yards), the most in Redskins history by a quarterback with at least 30 attempts.

Murray extended his 100-yard game rushing streak to eight games with 19 carries for 141 yards.

The game was the 107th meeting in 54 years between the Cowboys and the Redskins. After the loss to Washington, the Cowboys now had a total of 64 wins to 41 losses and 2 ties in 54 years.

Including the loss to the Redskins on Monday Night, the Cowboys had played in a total of 75 Monday Night games and had an overall record of 43–32.

==== Week 9: vs. Arizona Cardinals ====
Week Nine: Arizona Cardinals at Dallas Cowboys – Game summary

Quarter	1	2	3	4	Total
**Cardinals**	0	14	0	14	**28**
Cowboys	10	0	0	7	**17**

at AT&T Stadium, Arlington, Texas

- Date: November 2
- Game time: 12:00 p.m. CST
- Game weather: 57 °F (14 °C), cloudy (retractable roof open)
- Game attendance: 85,688
- Referee: Craig Wrolstad
- TV announcers (Fox): Joe Buck, Troy Aikman and Erin Andrews
- Recap, Gamebook

Game information

First quarter

- DAL –Tyler Patmon 58 yard interception return (Dan Bailey kick), 11:07 (DAL 7–0)
- DAL –Dan Bailey 52 yard field goal, 4:08 (DAL 10–0)

Second quarter

- ARI –John Carlson 7 yard pass from Carson Palmer (Chandler Catanzaro kick), 12:39 (DAL 10–7)
- ARI –Jaron Brown 11 yard pass from Carson Palmer (Chandler Catanzaro kick), 4:39 (ARI 14–10)

Third quarter

No Score

Fourth quarter

- ARI –Andre Ellington 1 yard pass from Carson Palmer (Chandler Catanzaro kick), 6:05 (ARI 21–10)
- ARI –Marion Grice 1 yard rush (Chandler Catanzaro kick), 4:23 (ARI 28–10)
- DAL – Dez Bryant 3 yard pass from Brandon Weeden, 1:13 (Dan Bailey kick)(ARI 28–17)

Top passers

- ARI – Carson Palmer, 22/34, 249 Yds, 3 TD, 1 INT, 31 Lng
- DAL – Brandon Weeden, 18/33, 183 Yds, 1 TD, 2 INT, 40 Lng

Top rushers

- ARI – Andre Ellington, 21 Car, 95 Yds, 0 TD, 20 Lng
- DAL – DeMarco Murray, 19 Car, 79 Yds, 0 TD, 17 Lng

Top receivers

- ARI – Larry Fitzgerald, 5 Rec, 70 Yds, 0 TD, 31 Lng
- ARI – Andre Ellington, 4 Rec, 39 Yds, 1 TD, 20 Lng
- DAL – Jason Witten, 6 Rec, 62 Yds, 0 TD, 24 Lng
- DAL – Dez Bryant, 2 Rec, 15 Yds, 1 TD, 12 Lng

Top tacklers

- ARI –
- DAL –

===== Game notes =====
Brandon Weeden started in place of Tony Romo, who had injured himself the week prior. Weeden had a rough time of it against the stingy Cardinals defense, throwing two interceptions and only managed to compile 183 yards through the air.

It was the Cowboys' third home loss of the season, and the same score as the season opener against the 49ers. The Cardinals also managed to hold DeMarco Murray under the 100-yard mark, the first team to do so in 2014.

==== Week 10: at Jacksonville Jaguars ====
NFL International Series

Week Ten: Dallas Cowboys at Jacksonville Jaguars – Game summary

Quarter	1	2	3	4	Total
**Cowboys**	10	14	7	0	**31**
Jaguars	7	0	0	10	**17**

at Wembley Stadium, London, England

- Date: November 9
- Game time: 6:00 p.m. GMT/12:00 p.m. CST
- Game weather: 50 °F (10 °C), clear
- Game attendance: 83,603
- Referee: John Parry
- TV announcers (Fox): Kenny Albert, Daryl Johnston and Tony Siragusa
- Recap, Gamebook

Game information

First quarter

- DAL – Dan Bailey 54-yard FG, 12:09 (DAL 3–0)
- JAX – Denard Robinson 32-yard TD run, (Josh Scobee kick), 7:36 (JAX 7–3)
- DAL – Jason Witten 2 yard pass from Tony Romo (Dan Bailey kick), 2:38 (DAL 10–7)

Second quarter

- DAL -Dez Bryant 35 yard pass from Tony Romo (Dan Bailey kick), 7:13 (DAL 17–7)
- DAL -Dez Bryant 68 yard pass from Tony Romo (Dan Bailey kick), 2:38 (DAL 24–7)

Third quarter

- DAL – Joseph Randle 40 yard rush (Dan Bailey kick), 7:44 (DAL 31–7)

Fourth quarter

- JAX – Holding against the Dallas punt team inside the end zone for a safety, 8:07 (DAL 31–9)
- JAX – Denard Robinson 1 yard rush (Allen Robinson pass from Blake Bortles for 2 points), 1:58 (DAL 31–17)

Top passers

- DAL – Tony Romo, 20/27, 246 Yds, 3 TD, 0 INT, 68 Lng
- JAX – Blake Bortles, 22/37, 290 Yds, 0 TD, 1 INT, 53 Lng

Top rushers

- DAL – DeMarco Murray, 19 Car, 100 Yds, 0 TD, 23 Lng
- JAX – Denard Robinson, 15 Car, 60 Yds, 2 TD, 32 Lng

Top receivers

- DAL – Dez Bryant, 6 Rec, 158 Yds, 2 TD, 68 Lng
- JAX – Cecil Shorts, 5 Rec, 119 Yds, 0 TD, 53 Lng

Top tacklers

- DAL – Anthony Hitchens: 2 tackles
- JAX – Johnathan Cyprien: 2 tackles

===== Game notes =====
Tony Romo's return was a successful one, as the Cowboys went across the pond and posted a comfortable win over one of the worst teams in the league.

Dez Bryant had a monster day receiving, catching six passes for 158 yards and two scores, all in the first half. DeMarco Murray got back in the 100-yard category after losing his streak in the loss to the Cardinals the week before.

==== Week 12: at New York Giants ====
Week Twelve: Dallas Cowboys at New York Giants – Game summary

Quarter	1	2	3	4	Total
**Cowboys**	3	7	14	7	**31**
Giants	7	14	0	7	**28**

at MetLife Stadium, East Rutherford, New Jersey

- Date: November 23
- Game time: 8:30 p.m. EST/7:30 p.m. CST
- Game weather: 51 °F (11 °C), cloudy
- Game attendance: 80,520
- Referee: Bill Vinovich
- TV announcers (NBC): Al Michaels, Cris Collinsworth and Michele Tafoya
- Recap, Gamebook

Game information

First quarter

- NYG – Odell Beckham Jr. 3 yard pass from Eli Manning (Josh Brown kick), 7:06 (NYG 7–0)
- DAL – Dan Bailey 38 yard field goal, 2:50 (NYG 7–3)

Second quarter

- NYG – Odell Beckham Jr. 43 yard pass from Eli Manning (Josh Brown kick), 15:00 (NYG 14–3)
- DAL – Jason Witten 4 yard pass from Tony Romo (Dan Bailey kick), 9:22 (NYG 14–10)
- NYG – Andre Williams 3 yard rush (Josh Brown kick), 3:22 (NYG 21–10)

Third quarter

- DAL – Cole Beasley 45 yard pass from Tony Romo (Dan Bailey kick), 6:48 (NYG 21–17)
- DAL – Dez Bryant 31 yard pass from Tony Romo (Dan Bailey kick), 1:19 (DAL 24–21)

Fourth quarter

- NYG – Adrien Robinson 1 yard pass from Eli Manning (Josh Brown kick), 3:06 (NYG 28–24)
- DAL – Dez Bryant 31 yard pass from Tony Romo (Dan Bailey kick), 1:19 (DAL 31–28)

Top passers

- DAL – Tony Romo, 18/26, 279 Yds, 4 TD, 0 INT, 45 Lng
- NYG – Eli Manning, 29/40, 338 Yds, 3 TD, 1 INT, 43 Lng

Top rushers

- DAL – DeMarco Murray, 24 Car, 121 Yds, 0 TD, 18 Lng
- NYG – Rashad Jennings, 19 Car, 52 Yds, 0 TD, 12 Lng

Top receivers

- DAL – Dez Bryant 7 Rec, 86 Yds, 2 TD, 31 Lng
- DAL – Jason Witten 4 Rec, 30 Yds, 1 TD, 15 Lng
- DAL – Cole Beasley 2 Rec, 66 Yds, 1 TD, 45 Lng
- NYG – Odell Beckham Jr. 10 Rec, 146 Yds, 2 TD, 43 Lng
- NYG – Rashad Jennings, 8 Rec, 68 Yds, 2 TD, 27 Lng
- NYG – Rueben Randle, 3 Rec, 36 Yds, 0 TD, 21 Lng

Top tacklers

- DAL –
- NYG –

===== Game notes =====
The Cowboys swept their season series against the Giants for the second year in a row. The Cowboys beat the Giants 5 out of the 6 meetings from 2012 to 2014.

With the win, Dallas improved to 8–3 on the season, setting up a showdown with the 8–3 Eagles for first place in the NFC East on Thanksgiving Day.

DeMarco Murray went over 100 yards yet again, rushing for 121 yards but failed to get in the end zone.

Giants rookie wide receiver Odell Beckham Jr. finished his historic night with 10 catches for 146 yards and two scores.

Rapper and New York City native Jay Z attended the game and was seen having a brief conversation with Jerry Jones on the field prior to kickoff. This was somewhat of an event due to Jay Z's agency, Roc Nation, signing on as Dez Bryant's representation earlier in the month. The pair spoke briefly before the game, which led to questions about whether they were discussing Bryant's contract negotiations. Jones later claimed that the brief conversation had nothing to do with contract negotiations.

==== Week 13: vs. Philadelphia Eagles ====
Thanksgiving Day game

Week Thirteen: Philadelphia Eagles at Dallas Cowboys – Game summary

Quarter	1	2	3	4	Total
**Eagles**	14	9	7	3	**33**
Cowboys	0	7	3	0	**10**

at AT&T Stadium, Arlington, Texas

- Date: November 27
- Game time: 3:30 p.m. CST
- Game weather: Played indoors (retractable roof closed)
- Game attendance: 91,379
- Referee: Clete Blakeman
- TV announcers (Fox): Joe Buck, Troy Aikman and Erin Andrews
- Recap, Gamebook

Game information

First quarter

- PHI – Mark Sanchez 2 yard rush (Cody Parkey kick), 12:00 (PHI 7–0)
- PHI – Jordan Matthews 27 yard pass from Mark Sanchez (Cody Parkey kick), 4:17 (PHI 14–0)

Second quarter

- DAL – DeMarco Murray 1 yard rush (Dan Bailey kick), 15:00 (PHI 14–7)
- PHI – Cody Parkey 31 yard field goal, 12:14 (PHI 17–7)
- PHI – Cody Parkey 22 yard field goal, 1:39 (PHI 20–7)
- PHI – Cody Parkey 26 yard field goal, 0:24 (PHI 23–7)

Third quarter

- DAL – Dan Bailey 28 yard field goal, 9:16 (PHI 23–10)
- PHI – LeSean McCoy 38 yard rush (Cody Parkey kick), 7:29 (PHI 30–10)

Fourth quarter

- PHI – Cody Parkey 26 yard field goal, 11:05 (PHI 33–10)

Top passers

- PHI – Mark Sanchez, 20/29, 217 Yds, 1 TD, 0 INT, 58 Lng
- DAL – Tony Romo, 18/29, 199 Yds, 0 TD, 2 INT, 38 Lng

Top rushers

- PHI – LeSean McCoy, 25 Car, 159 Yds, 1 TD, 38 Lng
- DAL – DeMarco Murray, 20 Car, 73 Yds, 1 TD, 9 Lng

Top receivers

- PHI – Jeremy Maclin 8 Rec, 108 Yds, 0 TD, 58 Lng
- DAL – Dez Bryant 4 Rec, 73 Yds, 0 TD, 38 Lng

Top tacklers

- PHI –
- DAL –

===== Game notes =====
With the 33–10 victory against Dallas, the Eagles were now 2–0 against the Cowboys on Thanksgiving Day and 6–0 overall for Thanksgiving games.

Tony Romo's 38-game streak with at least one touchdown pass came to an end against Philadelphia. Romo's 38-game touchdown streak was the longest in franchise history and fifth longest in NFL history and the second-longest among active streaks, behind Peyton Manning's 50. Romo was 18 of 29 for 199 yards and 0 TDs in the loss.

It was the fourth loss of the season for Dallas at home, and DeMarco Murray failed to break 100 yards for only the second time this season.

==== Week 14: at Chicago Bears ====
Week Fourteen: Dallas Cowboys at Chicago Bears – Game summary

Quarter	1	2	3	4	Total
**Cowboys**	0	14	21	6	**41**
Bears	0	7	0	21	**28**

at Soldier Field, Chicago, Illinois

- Date: December 4
- Game time: 7:25 p.m. CST
- Game weather: 35 °F (2 °C), cloudy
- Game attendance: 61,558
- Referee: Ed Hochuli
- TV announcers (CBS/NFLN): Jim Nantz, Phil Simms and Tracy Wolfson
- Recap, Gamebook

Game information

First quarter

No Score

Second quarter

- DAL – DeMarco Murray 1 yard rush (Dan Bailey kick), 10:53 (Dal 7–0)
- CHI – Martellus Bennett 12 yard pass from Jay Cutler (Jay Feely kick), 6:18 (Tie 7–7)
- DAL – Cole Beasley 13 yard pass from Tony Romo (Dan Bailey kick), 0:13 (Dal 14–7)

Third quarter

- DAL – Cole Beasley 24 yard pass from Tony Romo (Dan Bailey kick), 12:41 (Dal 21–7)
- DAL – Gavin Escobar 6 yard pass from Tony Romo (Dan Bailey kick), 8:08 (Dal 28–7)
- DAL – Joseph Randle 17 yard rush (Dan Bailey kick), 2:18 (Dal 35–7)

Fourth quarter

- CHI – Alshon Jeffery 27 yard pass from Jay Cutler (Jay Feely kick), 15:00 (Dal 35–14)
- DAL – Dan Bailey 35 yard field goal, 12:41 (Dal 38–14)
- CHI – Matt Forte 1 yard rush (Matt Forte run for 2 points), 7:22 (Dal 38–21)
- CHI – Jay Cutler 10 yard rush (Jay Feely kick), 6:16 (Dal 38–28)
- DAL – Dan Bailey 27 yard field goal, 3:44 (Dal 41–28)

Top passers

- DAL –Tony Romo, 21/26, 205 Yds, 3 TD, 0 INT, 43 Lng
- CHI –Jay Cutler, 32/46, 341 Yds, 2 TD, 1 INT, 42 Lng

Top rushers

- DAL –DeMarco Murray, 32 Car, 179 Yds, 1 TD, 40 Lng
- CHI –Matt Forte, 13 Car, 26 Yds, 1 TD, 7 Lng

Top receivers

- DAL –Dez Bryant 6 Rec, 82 Yds, 0 TD, 43 Lng
- DAL –Cole Beasley 3 Rec, 42 Yds, 2 TD, 24 Lng
- DAL –DeMarco Murray 9 Rec, 49 Yds, 0 TD, 11 Lng
- CHI –Martellus Bennett 12 Rec, 84 Yds, 1 TD, 16 Lng
- CHI –Alshon Jeffery 6 Rec, 95 Yds, 1 TD, 27 Lng
- CHI –Matt Forte 8 Rec, 74 Yds, 0 TD, 21 Lng

Top tacklers

- DAL –
- CHI –

===== Game notes =====
With the win, the Cowboys avoided going 8–8 for the first time since 2010, and clinched a winning season, the first since the 2009 team won the NFC East and won a playoff game.

After defeating the Bears in Chicago, the Cowboys were 6–0 on the road after 13 games into their 2014 season. Oddly enough, the last time Dallas lost on the road was in Chicago 45–28 nearly a year earlier on December 9, 2013. That devastating loss to the Bears began the 7–5 Cowboys' late-season slide, losing 3 out of their 4 final games, and ending the year with a 3rd straight 8–8 season and no playoff appearance for the 4th year in a row.

==== Week 15: at Philadelphia Eagles ====
Week Fifteen: Dallas Cowboys at Philadelphia Eagles – Game summary

Quarter	1	2	3	4	Total
**Cowboys**	14	7	7	10	**38**
Eagles	0	10	14	3	**27**

at Lincoln Financial Field, Philadelphia, Pennsylvania

- Date: December 14
- Game time: 8:30 p.m. EST/7:30 p.m. CST
- Game weather: 41 °F (5 °C), partly cloudy
- Game attendance: 69,596
- Referee: Terry McAulay
- TV announcers (NBC): Al Michaels, Cris Collinsworth and Michele Tafoya
- Recap, Gamebook

Game information

First quarter

- DAL – DeMarco Murray 1 Yard Rush (Dan Bailey kick), 12:51 (Dal 7–0)
- DAL – Dez Bryant 4 yard pass from Tony Romo (Dan Bailey kick), 3:08 (Dal 14–0)

Second quarter

- DAL – Dez Bryant 26 yard pass from Tony Romo (Dan Bailey kick), 12:01 (Dal 21–0)
- PHI – Chris Polk 5 Yard Rush (Cody Parkey kick), 8:36 (Dal 21–7)
- PHI – Cody Parkey 47 yard field goal, 1:53 (Dal 21–10)

Third quarter

- PHI – Chris Polk 1 Yard Rush (Cody Parkey kick), 8:51 (Dal 21–17)
- PHI – Darren Sproles 1 Yard Rush (Cody Parkey kick), 5:47 (Phi 24–21)
- DAL – DeMarco Murray 2 Yard Rush (Dan Bailey kick), 0:50 (Dal 28–24)

Fourth quarter

- DAL – Dez Bryant 25 yard pass from Tony Romo (Dan Bailey kick), 12:55 (Dal 35–24)
- PHI – Cody Parkey 43 yard field goal, 10:50 (Dal 35–27)
- DAL – Dan Bailey 49 yard field goal, 4:42 (Dal 38–27)

Top passers

- DAL – Tony Romo, 22/31, 265 Yds, 3 TD, 0 INT, 26 Lng
- PHI – Mark Sanchez, 17/28, 252 Yds, 0 TD, 2 INT, 72 Lng

Top rushers

- DAL – DeMarco Murray, 31 Car, 81 Yds, 2 TD, 21 Lng
- PHI – LeSean McCoy, 16 Car, 64 Yds, 0 TD, 14 Lng

Top receivers

- DAL – Dez Bryant 6 Rec, 114 Yds, 3 TD, 26 Lng
- DAL – Jason Witten 7 Rec, 69 Yds, 0 TD, 21 Lng
- PHI – Jeremy Maclin 4 Rec, 98 Yds, 0 TD, 72 Lng
- PHI – Brent Celek 4 Rec, 52 Yds, 0 TD, 23 Lng

Top tacklers

- DAL –
- PHI –

===== Game notes =====
For the second consecutive year, Dallas and Philadelphia split the season series with the road team winning all four games. Dallas had now won 5 out of their last 6 meetings in Philadelphia.

With the win, the Cowboys took a one-game lead in the NFC East with two games to go.

The victory over the Eagles in Philadelphia improved the Cowboys' road record to 7–0 for the season.

==== Week 16: vs. Indianapolis Colts ====
Week Sixteen: Indianapolis Colts at Dallas Cowboys – Game summary

Quarter	1	2	3	4	Total
Colts	0	0	0	7	**7**
**Cowboys**	14	14	7	7	**42**

at AT&T Stadium, Arlington, Texas

- Date: December 21
- Game time: 3:25 p.m. CST
- Game weather: Played indoors (retractable roof closed)
- Game attendance: 91,899
- Referee: Bill Leavy
- TV announcers (CBS): Jim Nantz, Phil Simms and Tracy Wolfson
- Recap, Gamebook

Game information

First quarter

- DAL – Terrance Williams 9 yard pass from Tony Romo (Dan Bailey kick), 6:40 (DAL 7–0)
- DAL – Dez Bryant 19 yard pass from Tony Romo (Dan Bailey kick), 4:30 (DAL 14–0)

Second quarter

- DAL – Cole Beasley 24 yard pass from Tony Romo (Dan Bailey kick), 14:19 (DAL 21–0)
- DAL – DeMarco Murray 1 yard rush (Dan Bailey kick), 6:38 (DAL 28–0)

Third quarter

- DAL – Jason Witten 25 yard pass from Tony Romo (Dan Bailey kick), 4:48 (DAL 35–0)

Fourth quarter

- DAL – Terrance Williams 43 yard pass from Brandon Weeden (Dan Bailey kick), 10:19 (DAL 42–0)
- IND – Zurlon Tipton 1 yard pass from Matt Hasselbeck (Adam Vinatieri kick), 5:29 (DAL 42–7)

Top passers

- IND – Andrew Luck, 15/22, 109 Yds, 0 TD, 2 INT, 22 Lng
- IND – Matt Hasselbeck, 15/21, 126 Yds, 1 TD, 0 INT, 21 Lng
- DAL –Tony Romo, 18/20, 218 Yds, 4 TD, 0 INT, 25 Lng
- DAL –Brandon Weeden, 1/1, 43 Yds, 1 TD, 0 INT, 43 Lng

Top rushers

- IND – Dan Herron, 7 Car, 3 Yds, 0 TD, 4 Lng
- IND – Trent Richardson, 2 Car, 1 Yds, 0 TD, 3 Lng
- IND – Zurlon Tipton, 1 Car, −3 Yds, 0 TD, −3 Lng
- DAL – DeMarco Murray, 22 Car, 58 Yds, 1 TD, 11 Lng
- DAL – Joseph Randle, 13 Car, 27 Yds, 0 TD, 12 Lng
- DAL – Tony Romo, 3 Car, 28 Yds, 0 TD, 13 Lng

Top receivers

- IND – Hakeem Nicks 9 Rec, 72 Yds, 0 TD, 21 Lng
- IND – Dan Herron 3 Rec, 37 Yds, 0 TD, 22 Lng
- DAL – Dez Bryant 5 Rec, 73 Yds, 1 TD, 24 Lng
- DAL – Terrance Williams 2 Rec, 52 Yds, 2 TD, 43 Lng
- DAL – Jason Witten 7 Rec, 90 Yds, 1 TD, 25 Lng

Top tacklers

- IND –
- DAL –

===== Game notes =====
Through the 2014 season, the Cowboys won the NFC East 22 times in their 54-year history.

After quarterback Tony Romo completed a 25-yard touchdown pass to TE Jason Witten late in the third quarter, Romo eclipsed Troy Aikman as the all-time leader in passing yards in franchise history. The throw put Romo at 32,961 passing yards in his career, passing Aikman's career total of 32,942. Romo finished the game with 218 yards, putting him at 32,971 for his career.

At the start of the game, Murray had a total of 1,686 yards on the season and needed only 87 yards to pass Hall of Famer Emmitt Smith's team record for the most rushing yards in a single season with 1,773 yards set in 1995. However, with Murray still nursing the injury, coupled with an early Cowboys rout, Murray ended up with only 22 carries for 59 yards on the day, leaving him with a total of 1,745 yards for the year, just 28 yards short of Smith's single season record with one more game left to be played.

==== Week 17: at Washington Redskins ====
Week Seventeen: Dallas Cowboys at Washington Redskins – Game summary

Quarter	1	2	3	4	Total
**Cowboys**	17	10	0	17	**44**
Redskins	7	3	0	7	**17**

at FedExField, Landover, Maryland

- Date: December 28
- Game time: 1:00 p.m. EST/12:00 p.m. CST
- Game weather: 58 °F (14 °C), cloudy
- Game attendance: 80,897
- Referee: Jerome Boger
- TV announcers (Fox): Kevin Burkhardt, John Lynch and Pam Oliver
- Recap, Gamebook

Game information

First quarter

- DAL – Dan Bailey 21-yard field goal, 10:19 (DAL 3–0)
- WAS – DeSean Jackson 69-yard pass from Robert Griffin (Kai Forbath kick), 8:55 (WAS 7–3)
- DAL – Dez Bryant 65 yard pass from Tony Romo (Dan Bailey kick), 6:37 (DAL 10–7)
- DAL – Dez Bryant 23 yard pass from Tony Romo (Dan Bailey kick), 2:47 (DAL 17–7)

Second quarter

- DAL – Dan Bailey 32-yard field goal, 11:35 (DAL 20–7)
- DAL – DeMarco Murray 9 yard rush (Dan Bailey kick), 8:17 (DAL 27–7)
- WAS – Kai Forbath 25 yard field goal, 1:25 (DAL 27–10)

Third quarter

No Scoring

Fourth quarter

- WAS – Robert Griffin 2 yard rush (Kai Forbath kick), 6:52 (DAL 27–17)
- DAL – Dan Bailey 23-yard field goal, 3:36 (DAL 30–17)
- DAL – Anthony Spencer 5 yard fumble return (Dan Bailey kick), 3:18 (DAL 37–17)
- DAL – Joseph Randle 65 yard rush (Dan Bailey kick), 1:49 (DAL 44–17)

Top passers

- DAL – Tony Romo, 22/34, 299 Yds, 2 TD, 1 INT, 65 Lng
- WAS – Robert Griffin, 27/41, 336 Yds, 1 TD, 2 INT, 69 Lng

Top rushers

- DAL – DeMarco Murray, 20 Car, 100 Yds, 1 TD, 32 Lng
- DAL – Joseph Randle, 4 Car, 69 Yds, 1 TD, 65 Lng
- WAS – Alfred Morris, 12 Car, 43 Yds, 0 TD, 22 Lng
- WAS – Roy Helu, 6 Car, 42 Yds, 0 TD, 15 Lng

Top receivers

- DAL – Dez Bryant, 4 Rec, 99 Yds, 2 TD, 64 Lng
- DAL – Terrance Williams, 3 Rec, 68 Yds, 0 TD, 51 Lng
- DAL – Cole Beasley, 6 Rec, 57 Yds, 0 TD, 19 Lng
- WAS – Jordan Reed, 9 Rec, 70 Yds, 0 TD, 16 Lng
- WAS – DeSean Jackson, 2 Rec, 86 Yds, 1 TD, 69 Lng
- WAS – Pierre Garçon, 2 Rec, 53 Yds, 0 TD, 47 Lng

Top tacklers

- DAL –
- WAS –

===== Game notes =====
With the victory, the Cowboys finished 12–4 on the season, their best record since the team's 13–3 campaign of 2007.

DeMarco Murray made Cowboys' history by finishing the season with 1,845 yards on 393 carries, surpassing Emmitt Smith's record of 1,773 in 1995; the 32-yard carry was Murray's longest since a 40-yard carry on December 4 against the Chicago Bears.

Dez Bryant also made Cowboys' history by catching 2 touchdown passes, giving him a total of 16 touchdown receptions on the year, breaking Terrell Owens's previous single-season touchdown reception record of 15 in 2007 (the second touchdown was originally called incomplete by the refs, but was overturned after review).

The game was the 108th meeting in 54 years between the Cowboys and Redskins. After this game, the Cowboys' all-time record versus the Redskins was 65–41–2 in 54 years.

=== Standings ===
==== Division ====
NFC East
	W	L	T	PCT	DIV	CONF	PF	PA	STK
^{(3)} Dallas Cowboys	12	4	0	.750	4–2	8–4	467	352	W4
Philadelphia Eagles	10	6	0	.625	4–2	6–6	474	400	W1
New York Giants	6	10	0	.375	2–4	4–8	380	400	L1
Washington Redskins	4	12	0	.250	2–4	2–10	301	438	L1

==== Conference ====
NFC
#	Team	Division	W	L	T	PCT	DIV	CONF	SOS	SOV	STK
**Division leaders**
1 (Note: Seattle, Green Bay and Dallas were ranked in seeds 1–3 based on conference record.)	Seattle Seahawks	West	12	4	0	.750	5–1	10–2	.525	.513	W6
2	Green Bay Packers	North	12	4	0	.750	5–1	9–3	.482	.440	W2
3	Dallas Cowboys	East	12	4	0	.750	4–2	8–4	.445	.422	W4
4	Carolina Panthers	South	7	8	1	.469	4–2	6–6	.490	.357	W4
**Wild Cards**
5 (Note: Arizona defeated Detroit head-to-head (Week 11, 14–6).)	Arizona Cardinals	West	11	5	0	.688	3–3	8–4	.523	.477	L2
6	Detroit Lions	North	11	5	0	.688	5–1	9–3	.471	.392	L1
**Did not qualify for the postseason**
7	Philadelphia Eagles	East	10	6	0	.625	4–2	6–6	.490	.416	W1
8	San Francisco 49ers	West	8	8	0	.500	2–4	7–5	.527	.508	W1
9 (Note: New Orleans defeated Minnesota head-to-head (Week 3, 20–9).)	New Orleans Saints	South	7	9	0	.438	3–3	6–6	.486	.415	W1
10	Minnesota Vikings	North	7	9	0	.438	1–5	6–6	.475	.308	W1
11 (Note: The NY Giants defeated both Atlanta and St. Louis head-to-head (Atlanta: Week 5, 30–20; St. Louis: Week 16, 37–27), while Atlanta finished ahead of St. Louis based on conference record.)	New York Giants	East	6	10	0	.375	2–4	4–8	.512	.323	L1
12	Atlanta Falcons	South	6	10	0	.375	5–1	6–6	.482	.380	L1
13	St. Louis Rams	West	6	10	0	.375	2–4	4–8	.531	.427	L3
14	Chicago Bears	North	5	11	0	.313	1–5	4–8	.529	.338	L5
15	Washington Redskins	East	4	12	0	.250	2–4	2–10	.496	.422	L1
16	Tampa Bay Buccaneers	South	2	14	0	.125	0–6	1–11	.486	.469	L6
**Tiebreakers** (Note: When breaking ties for three or more teams under the NFL's rules, they are first broken within divisions, then comparing only the highest-ranked remaining team from each division.)

== Postseason ==
=== Schedule ===
Playoff round	Date	Opponent (seed)	Result	Record	Game site	NFL.com recap
Wild card	January 4, 2015	Detroit Lions (6)	W 24–20	1–0	AT&T Stadium	Recap
Divisional	January 11, 2015	at Green Bay Packers (2)	L 21–26	1–1	Lambeau Field	Recap

=== Game summaries ===
==== NFC Wild Card Playoffs: vs. (6) Detroit Lions ====
NFC Wild Card Playoffs: (6) Detroit Lions at (3) Dallas Cowboys – Game summary

Quarter	1	2	3	4	Total
Lions	14	3	3	0	20
Cowboys	0	7	7	10	24

at AT&T Stadium, Arlington, Texas

- Date: January 4, 2015
- Game time: 3:40 p.m. CST
- Game weather: Played indoors (retractable roof closed)
- Game attendance: 91,410
- Referee: Pete Morelli
- TV announcers (Fox): Joe Buck, Troy Aikman, Erin Andrews and Chris Myers
- Recap, Gamebook

Game information

First quarter

- DET – Golden Tate 51-yard pass from Matthew Stafford (Matt Prater kick), 11:22. Lions 7–0. Drive: 4 plays, 62 yards, 2:04.
- DET – Reggie Bush 18-yard run (Matt Prater kick), 1:57. Lions 14–0. Drive: 14 plays, 99 yards, 7:10.

Second quarter

- DAL – Terrance Williams 76-yard pass from Tony Romo (Dan Bailey kick), 1:37. Lions 14–7. Drive: 3 plays, 74 yards, 0:38.
- DET – Matt Prater 39-yard field goal, 0:03. Lions 17–7. Drive: 10 plays, 59 yards, 1:34.

Third quarter

- DET – Matt Prater 37-yard field goal, 8:41. Lions 20–7. Drive: 8 plays, 50 yards, 4:03.
- DAL – DeMarco Murray 1-yard run (Dan Bailey kick), 2:54. Lions 20–14. Drive: 10 plays, 80 yards, 5:47.

Fourth quarter

- DAL – Dan Bailey 51-yard field goal, 12:16. Lions 20–17. Drive: 7 plays, 36 yards, 4:00.
- DAL – Terrance Williams 8-yard pass from Tony Romo (Dan Bailey kick), 2:32. Cowboys 24–20. Drive: 11 plays, 59 yards, 5:38.

Top passers

- DET – Matthew Stafford – 28/42, 323 yards, TD, INT
- DAL – Tony Romo – 19/31, 293 yards, 2 TD

Top rushers

- DET – Joique Bell – 12 rushes, 43 yards
- DAL – DeMarco Murray – 19 rushes, 75 yards, TD

Top receivers

- DET – Golden Tate – 6 rec, 89 yards, TD
- DAL – Terrance Williams – 3 rec, 92 yards, 2 TD

Top tacklers

- DET – James Ihedigbo – 7 tackles, 2 assists
- DAL – J. J. Wilcox – 7 tackles

===== Game notes =====
The Dallas Cowboys now lead the all-time head-to-head match-up against the Detroit Lions (14–12). The Cowboys also lead the all-time playoff match-up against the Lions (2–1).

This was the first time in franchise history that the Cowboys won a post-season game when trailing by 10 points or more at half time.

At the time, with this win over the Lions, the Cowboys became the team with the most NFL playoff wins with 34, one more than the Pittsburgh Steelers.

==== NFC Divisional Playoffs: at (2) Green Bay Packers ====
NFC Divisional Playoffs: (3) Dallas Cowboys at (2) Green Bay Packers – Game summary

Quarter	1	2	3	4	Total
Cowboys	7	7	7	0	21
Packers	7	3	10	6	26

at Lambeau Field, Green Bay, Wisconsin

- Date: January 11, 2015
- Game time: 12:05 p.m. CST
- Game weather: 24 °F (−4 °C), cloudy
- Game attendance: 79,704
- Referee: Gene Steratore
- TV announcers (Fox): Joe Buck, Troy Aikman, Erin Andrews and Chris Myers
- Recap, Gamebook

Game information

First quarter

- GB – Andrew Quarless 4-yard pass from Aaron Rodgers (Mason Crosby kick), 08:34. Packers 7–0. Drive: 10 plays, 60 yards, 4:22.
- DAL – Tyler Clutts 1-yard pass from Tony Romo (Dan Bailey kick), 01:09. Tied 7–7. Drive: 12 plays, 62 yards, 7:25.

Second quarter

- DAL – Terrance Williams 38-yard pass from Tony Romo, (Dan Bailey kick), 08:29. Cowboys 14–7. Drive: 5 plays, 64 yards, 2:53.
- GB – Mason Crosby 40-yard field goal, 00:03. Cowboys 14–10. Drive: 5 plays, 38 yards, 0:29.

Third quarter

- GB – Mason Crosby 30-yard field goal, 07:49. Cowboys 14–13. Drive: 6 plays, 32 yards, 3:18.
- DAL – DeMarco Murray 1-yard run, (Dan Bailey kick), 04:16. Cowboys 21–13. Drive: 6 plays, 80 yards, 3:34.
- GB – Davante Adams 46-yard pass from Aaron Rodgers, (Mason Crosby kick), 01:52. Cowboys 21–20. Drive: 7 plays, 90 yards, 2:31.

Fourth quarter

- GB – Richard Rodgers 13-yard pass from Aaron Rodgers, 2 point conversion attempt failed, 09:10. Packers 26–21. Drive: 8 plays, 80 yards, 4:19.

Top passers

- DAL – Tony Romo – 15/19, 191 yards, 2 TD
- GB – Aaron Rodgers – 24/35, 316 yards, 3 TD

Top rushers

- DAL – DeMarco Murray – 6 rushes, 71 yards
- GB – Eddie Lacy – 19 rushes, 101 yards

Top receivers

- DAL – Jason Witten – 6 rec, 71 yards
- GB – Davante Adams – 7 rec, 117 yards, 1 TD

Top tacklers

- DAL – Barry Church – 7 tackles, 1 assists
- GB – Julius Peppers – 6 tackles, 1 sack, 1 forced fumble

===== Game notes =====
The Packers defeated the Cowboys 26–21, ending their season. The Packers handed the Cowboys their first road loss of the season, snapping a 9-game road winning streak that began in week 16 of the 2013 season against the Washington Redskins.
