= Terrell McClain =

American football player (born 1988)

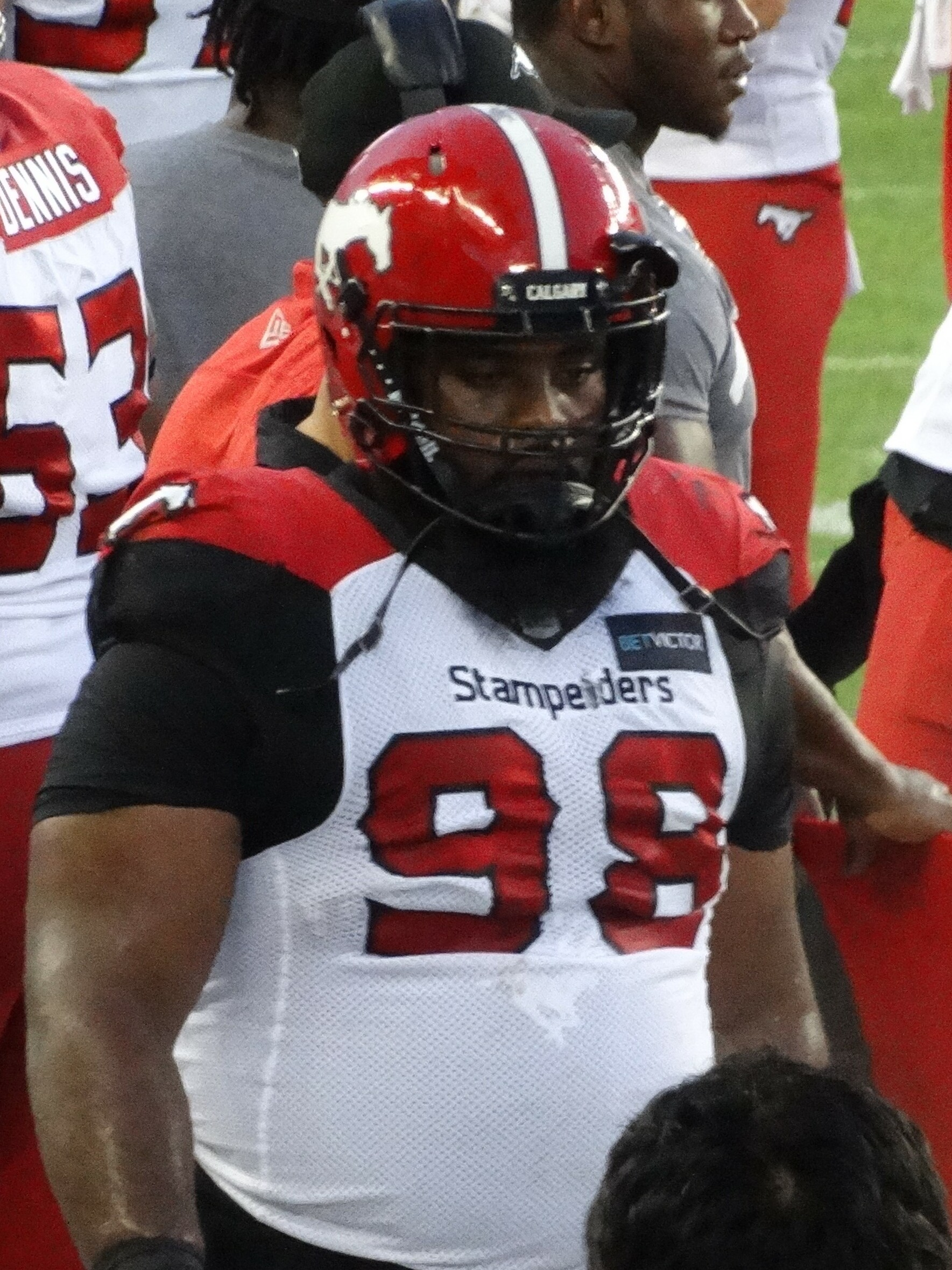
- McClain with the Calgary Stampeders in 2022

No. 97, 93, 99, 69, 98
- Position: Defensive lineman

Personal information
- Born: July 20, 1988 (age 38); Tampa, Florida, U.S.
- Listed height: 6 ft 2 in (1.88 m)
- Listed weight: 303 lb (137 kg)

Career information
- High school: Pensacola (Pensacola, Florida)
- College: South Florida
- NFL draft: 2011: 3rd round, 65th overall pick

Career history
- Carolina Panthers (2011); New England Patriots (2012); Houston Texans (2012–2013); Dallas Cowboys (2014–2016); Washington Redskins (2017); Atlanta Falcons (2018); Arizona Cardinals (2019)*; Kansas City Chiefs (2019); Oakland Raiders (2019); Calgary Stampeders (2022–2023)
- * Offseason or practice squad member only

Awards and highlights
- First-team All-Big East (2010)

Career NFL statistics
- Total tackles: 133
- Sacks: 7.5
- Forced fumbles: 3
- Fumble recoveries: 3
- Stats at Pro Football Reference

Terrell McClain (born July 20, 1988) is an American former professional football player who was a defensive lineman in the National Football League (NFL) and Canadian Football League (CFL). He was selected by the Carolina Panthers in the third round of the 2011 NFL draft. He played college football for the South Florida Bulls. He was also a member of the New England Patriots, Houston Texans, Dallas Cowboys, Washington Redskins, Atlanta Falcons, Arizona Cardinals, Kansas City Chiefs, Oakland Raiders, and Calgary Stampeders.

== Early life ==
McClain attended Pensacola High School, where he played as a defensive tackle for the Tigers high school football team. As a senior, he registered 65 tackles with 8 sacks, receiving Class 3A first team All-state honors. He was named MVP of Pensacola East-West All-Star Game.

== College career ==
He accepted a football scholarship from the University of South Florida. As a freshman, he appeared in 12 games, making 8 tackles, 4 tackles for loss, one quarterback pressure, one pass defensed and a fumble recovery.

As a sophomore he started 9 games at defensive tackle, tallying 32 tackles, 3.5 tackles for loss, 3 sacks, one quarterback pressure and a forced fumble. As a junior he started 11 games as part of a defense that ranked 19th in the nation in scoring, posting 25 tackles, 1.5 sacks, 3 quarterback pressures, 5 tackles for loss and a forced fumble.

As a senior, he started 13 games, collecting 24 tackles, 3 sacks, 5 quarterback pressures and 4.5 tackles for loss.

== Professional career ==
Pre-draft measurables
Height	Weight	Arm length	Hand span	Wingspan	40-yard dash	10-yard split	20-yard split	20-yard shuttle	Three-cone drill	Vertical jump	Broad jump	Bench press
6 ft 1 5/8 in (1.87 m)	297 lb (135 kg)	32 3/4 in (0.83 m)	10 1/8 in (0.26 m)	6 ft 6 3/4 in (2.00 m)	4.85 s	1.67 s	2.81 s	4.56 s	7.48 s	28.0 in (0.71 m)	8 ft 8 in (2.64 m)	29 reps
All values from NFL Combine/Pro Day

=== Carolina Panthers ===
McClain was selected by the Carolina Panthers in the third round (65th overall) of the 2011 NFL draft. As a rookie, he started 12 games at defensive tackle registering 20 tackles, a sack and a fumble recovery, before being placed on the injured reserve list with a left knee injury on December 6. He was released on September 2, 2012.

=== New England Patriots ===
McClain signed with the New England Patriots on September 26, 2012. He was waived on October 2, after being active for one game and not recording any statistics.

=== Houston Texans ===
McClain signed with the Houston Texans as a free agent on October 29, 2012. He played in 16 games and finished with a career-high 21 tackles and a fumble recovery.

=== Dallas Cowboys ===
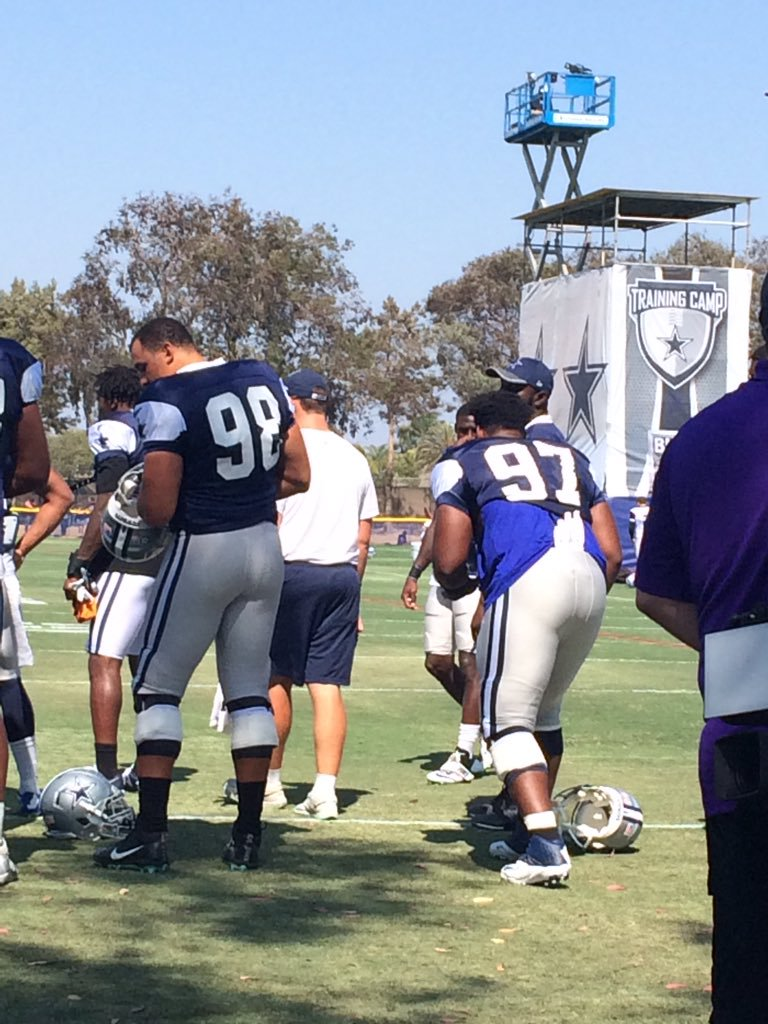
McClain (right) with the Dallas Cowboys in 2016

McClain signed as a free agent with the Dallas Cowboys on March 12, 2014. Although he looked strong and was taking advantage of the added work as Henry Melton recovered from knee surgery during off-season workouts, a high-ankle sprain he suffered in training camp affected his momentum. He played 13 games in a reserve role and finished with 20 tackles (3 for loss), 7 quarterback pressures, one sack and a forced fumble. His best game came against the Washington Redskins, notching 4 tackles, one sack and a forced fumble.

In 2015, he missed time during training camp with a bone bruise and hamstring injuries. He registered 4 tackles in the first two regular-season games, before being placed on the injured reserve list with a sprained big toe injury on September 22.

In 2016, he was able to earn a starting position over new free agent addition Cedric Thornton. He started in 15 games mostly at the three technique position and was considered the best defensive lineman on the team according to the media and observers. In the season opener against the New York Giants he had 5 tackles (one for loss). His best game came against the Cincinnati Bengals, when he registered 6 tackles (1 for loss), 1.5 sacks and 3 quarterback hurries. He did not play in the last game to rest an ankle injury he suffered against the Detroit Lions and be ready for the playoffs. He finished the season with 41 tackles (3 for loss), 2.5 sacks, 8 quarterback pressures and 2 forced fumbles.

=== Washington Redskins ===
On March 10, 2017, McClain signed a four-year contract with the Washington Redskins. He started 2 out of 12 games at defensive end in the team's 3-4 defense, after being passed on the depth chart by Stacy McGee. He registered 20 tackles, 2 sacks and one fumble recovery. He missed weeks 12 through 15 with a toe injury he suffered against the New Orleans Saints. He was released on April 30, 2018.

=== Atlanta Falcons ===
On May 11, 2018, McClain signed with the Atlanta Falcons.

=== Arizona Cardinals ===
On May 22, 2019, McClain signed with the Arizona Cardinals. On August 26, 2019, McClain was released by the Cardinals.

=== Kansas City Chiefs ===
On October 8, 2019, McClain signed with the Kansas City Chiefs. He was released on October 19, 2019.

=== Oakland Raiders ===
On October 30, 2019, McClain was signed by the Oakland Raiders. He was released on December 10, 2019.

=== Calgary Stampeders ===
On May 2, 2022, McClain signed with the Calgary Stampeders of the Canadian Football League (CFL). McClain was assigned to the practice squad at the end of the preseason, but made his Stampeder debut on August 20, 2022, in a game against the Toronto Argonauts.

He was released on February 13, 2024.

== NFL career statistics ==
Legend
**Bold**	Career high

=== Regular season ===
Year	Team	Games		Tackles					Interceptions					Fumbles			
Year	Team	GP	GS	Cmb	Solo	Ast	Sck	TFL	Int	Yds	TD	Lng	PD	FF	FR	Yds	TD
2011	CAR	12	12	19	13	6	1.0	2	0	0	0	0	0	0	**1**	0	0
2012	NWE	1	0	0	0	0	0.0	0	0	0	0	0	0	0	0	0	0
2012	HOU	3	0	0	0	0	0.0	0	0	0	0	0	0	0	0	0	0
2013	HOU	**16**	0	10	8	2	0.0	0	0	0	0	0	0	0	**1**	0	0
2014	DAL	13	0	19	14	5	1.0	**3**	0	0	0	0	0	1	0	0	0
2015	DAL	2	0	2	2	0	0.0	0	0	0	0	0	0	0	0	0	0
2016	DAL	15	**15**	**40**	**21**	**19**	**2.5**	**3**	0	0	0	0	0	**2**	0	0	0
2017	WAS	12	2	20	17	3	2.0	**3**	0	0	0	0	0	0	**1**	0	0
2018	ATL	13	5	17	9	8	1.0	1	0	0	0	0	0	0	0	0	0
2019	KAN	2	0	3	1	2	0.0	0	0	0	0	0	0	0	0	0	0
2019	OAK	3	0	3	1	2	0.0	0	0	0	0	0	0	0	0	0	0
Career		92	34	133	86	47	7.5	12	0	0	0	0	0	3	3	0	0

=== Playoffs ===
Year	Team	Games		Tackles					Interceptions					Fumbles			
Year	Team	GP	GS	Cmb	Solo	Ast	Sck	TFL	Int	Yds	TD	Lng	PD	FF	FR	Yds	TD
2014	DAL	**1**	0	0	0	0	0.0	0	0	0	0	0	0	0	0	0	0
2016	DAL	**1**	**1**	0	0	0	0.0	0	0	0	0	0	0	0	0	0	0
Career		2	1	0	0	0	0.0	0	0	0	0	0	0	0	0	0	0
