= J. C. Copeland =

American gridiron football player (born 1991)

No. 44
- Position: Defensive end / Fullback

Personal information
- Born: July 21, 1991 (age 35); Columbus, Georgia, U.S.
- Listed height: 5 ft 11 in (1.80 m)
- Listed weight: 271 lb (123 kg)

Career information
- High school: LaGrange (GA) Troup Co.
- College: LSU
- NFL draft: 2014: undrafted

Career history
- Dallas Cowboys (2014)*; New York Jets (2015)*; Toronto Argonauts (2016)*
- * Offseason or practice squad member only

Awards and highlights
- First-team All-American (2012); NFLPA Collegiate Bowl MVP (2014)
- Stats at Pro Football Reference

Javoddron Reon Holloway "J. C." Copeland (born July 21, 1991) is an American former college football player who was a defensive end and fullback for the LSU Tigers. He earned first-team All-American honors as a fullback in 2012. He was signed as an undrafted free agent by the Dallas Cowboys of the National Football League (NFL) in 2014.

== Early life ==
A native of Columbus, Georgia, Copeland attended Troup County High School in LaGrange, Georgia, where he was a two-way lineman and teammates with future NFL linebacker Reuben Foster. Regarded as a four-star recruit by Rivals.com, Copeland was listed the No. 17 weakside defensive end prospect in his class.

== College career ==
Originally recruited to LSU as a defensive lineman, Copeland was switched to fullback in his true freshman season. In 2012, he was named All-American by Pro Football Weekly.

Copeland was selected to play in the January 2014 edition of the NFLPA Collegiate Bowl. He played for the winning National team and was named game MVP after rushing for two touchdowns.

== Professional career ==
=== 2014 NFL Combine ===
Pre-draft measurables
Height	Weight	Arm length	Hand span	40-yard dash	20-yard shuttle	Three-cone drill	Vertical jump	Broad jump	Bench press
5 ft 11 in (1.80 m)	271 lb (123 kg)	32 in (0.81 m)	10 in (0.25 m)	4.95 s	4.58 s	7.68 s	28 1/2 in (0.72 m)	9 ft 3 in (2.82 m)	23 reps
All values from NFL Combine

=== Dallas Cowboys ===
In May 2014, Copeland signed with the Dallas Cowboys as an undrafted free agent. The Cowboys released Copeland on August 25, 2014.

=== New York Jets ===
Copeland was signed by the New York Jets on May 11, 2015. He was released on August 1, 2015.
