= Davon Coleman =

American gridiron football player (born 1991)

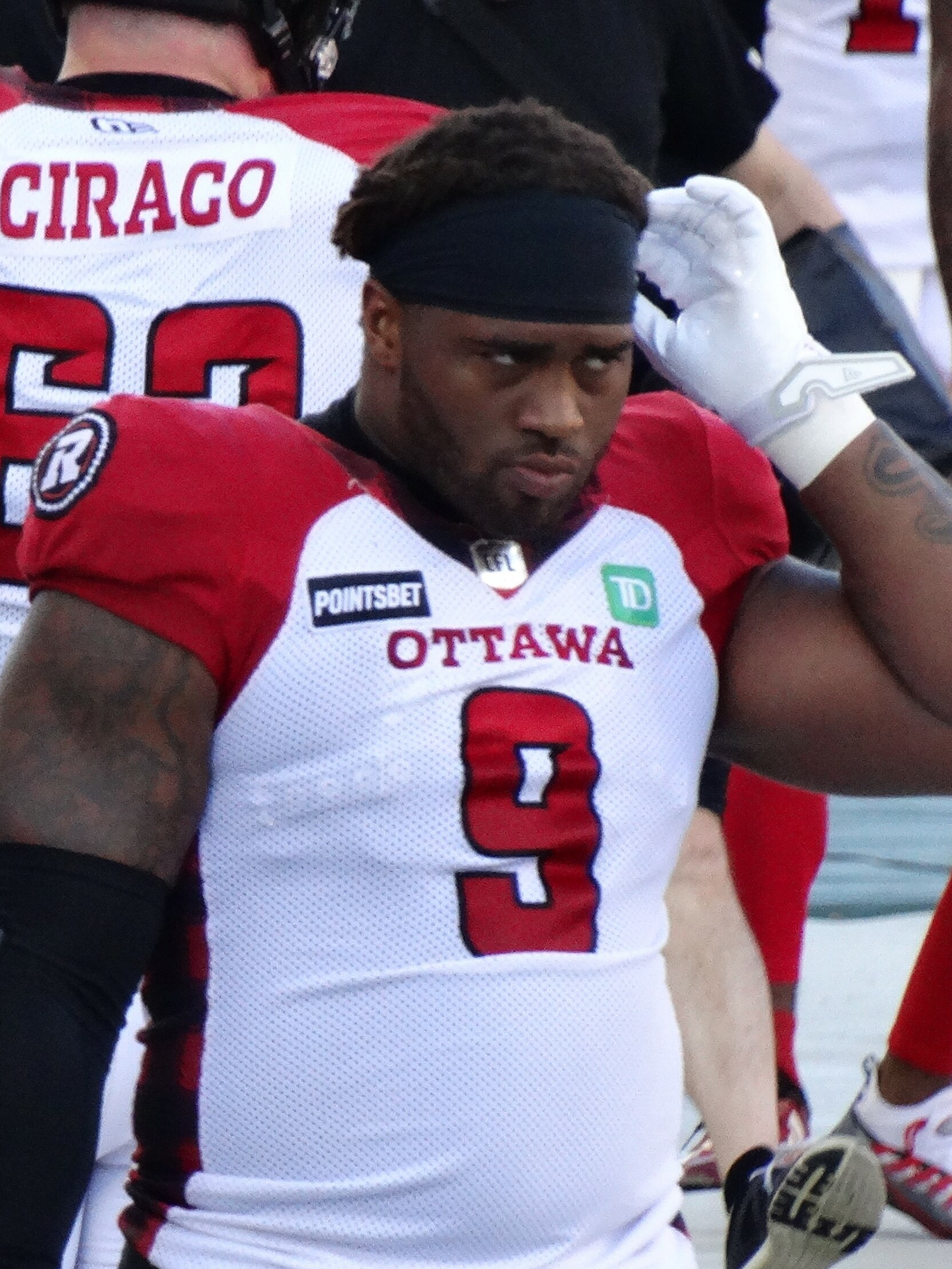
- Coleman with the Ottawa Redblacks in 2022

No. 60
- Position: Defensive tackle

Personal information
- Born: January 11, 1991 (age 35); Cleveland, Ohio, U.S.
- Listed height: 6 ft 2 in (1.88 m)
- Listed weight: 295 lb (134 kg)

Career information
- High school: Glenville (Cleveland)
- College: Arizona State
- NFL draft: 2014: undrafted

Career history
- Dallas Cowboys (2014–2015); Chicago Bears (2015)*; Tampa Bay Buccaneers (2016)*; New York Giants (2016)*; Hamilton Tiger-Cats (2017); BC Lions (2018–2019); Toronto Argonauts (2019); Ottawa Redblacks (2021–2022)
- * Offseason or practice squad member only

Awards and highlights
- CFL All-Star (2018); CFL West All-Star (2018)

Career NFL statistics
- Games played: 4
- Total tackles: 3
- Stats at Pro Football Reference

Career CFL statistics
- Total tackles: 174
- Sacks: 24
- Stats at CFL.ca

Davon Coleman (born January 11, 1991) is an American former professional football player who was a defensive tackle in the National Football League (NFL) and Canadian Football League (CFL). He played college football at Fort Scott Community College and Arizona State University. He was a member of four NFL teams (Dallas Cowboys, Chicago Bears, Tampa Bay Buccaneers, New York Giants) and four CFL teams (Hamilton Tiger-Cats, BC Lions, Toronto Argonauts, Ottawa Redblacks).

== Early life ==
Coleman attended Glenville High School. As a senior, he received honorable-mention All-Ohio honors. He also practiced wrestling.

== College career ==
Coleman enrolled a Fort Scott Community College. As a redshirt freshman, he tallied 65 tackles, 8.5 tackles-for-loss, 2.5 sacks, two forced fumbles, two passes defensed and one interception. He transferred to Arizona State University after the season.

As a sophomore, he appeared in 13 games with 3 starts. He collected 42 tackles (5 for loss), 2.5 sacks, one pass defensed and one forced fumble. He had 5 tackles against the University of Southern California.

As a junior, he played mostly at defensive end (9 starts). He posted 66 tackles, 11 tackles for loss (fifth on the team), 5 sacks, one fumble recovery and one blocked extra point. He had 9 tackles (2 for loss) and one sack filling in for an injured Will Sutton against the University of Oregon. He made 10 tackles against the University of Southern California. He had 2 sacks and 3 tackles for loss against Washington State University.

As a senior, he moved to defensive tackle and started all 13 games. He recorded 58 tackles, 8.5 sacks (tied for the team lead) and 15 tackles for loss (third on the team). Against the University of Colorado, he had four tackles (2.5 for loss), .5 sacks, forced an intentional grounding in the end zone for a safety and caught a short reception on the goal line from the fullback position for his first career touchdown. He made 1.5 sacks and 2.5 tackles for loss against the University of Utah. He had 2.5 sacks and 3.5 tackles for loss against UCLA.

He finished his college career with 166 tackles (31 for loss) and 16 sacks in 39 games (22 starts).

== Professional career ==
Coleman was signed as an undrafted free agent by the Dallas Cowboys after the 2014 NFL draft, on May 13. Because of injuries on the defensive line, he made his NFL debut and first career start in the season opener against the San Francisco 49ers, recording two tackles. He was active for the first 2 contests, before his progress was slowed after suffering a knee injury in a weight room accident. He was declared inactive for the next 8 games and was eventually waived on November 22. He was signed to the practice squad on November 24.

On December 22, 2015, the Chicago Bears signed Coleman to the practice squad.

On February 5, 2016, he was signed to a futures contract by the Tampa Bay Buccaneers. On May 17, he was released to make room for defensive tackle A. J. Francis.

On July 29, 2016, Coleman signed as a free agent with the New York Giants. On August 30, 2016, he was waived by the Giants.

On April 19, 2017, Coleman signed with the Hamilton Tiger-Cats of the Canadian Football League. He appeared in 17 games with 16 starts at defensive tackle, while making 41 tackles and 5 sacks.

On May 25, 2018, Coleman was traded along with a 2019 sixth-round pick to the BC Lions in exchange for a 2019 fourth-round pick. On November 7, 2018, his contract was extended through the 2019 season. He played in all 18 regular season games, recording 57 defensive tackles, eight sacks, and two interceptions. He was named a CFL All-Star at the end of the season. In 2019, Coleman played in eight games for the Lions, contributing with 13 defensive tackles, two sacks and one interception.

On August 12, 2019, Coleman was traded to the Toronto Argonauts along with a conditional 2020 eighth-round draft pick in exchange for defensive end Shawn Lemon. He appeared in six games, collecting 16 tackles and two sacks.

On February 5, 2021, Coleman signed with the Ottawa Redblacks. He played in all 14 regular season games in 2021 where he had 32 defensive tackles and four sacks. In 2022, he recorded 16 defensive tackles, four sacks, and two forced fumbles. He scored his first career touchdown on September 2, 2022, in the Labour Day Classic where he returned a fumble seven yards for the major. He was released on February 24, 2023.
