= Henry Melton =

American football player (born 1986)

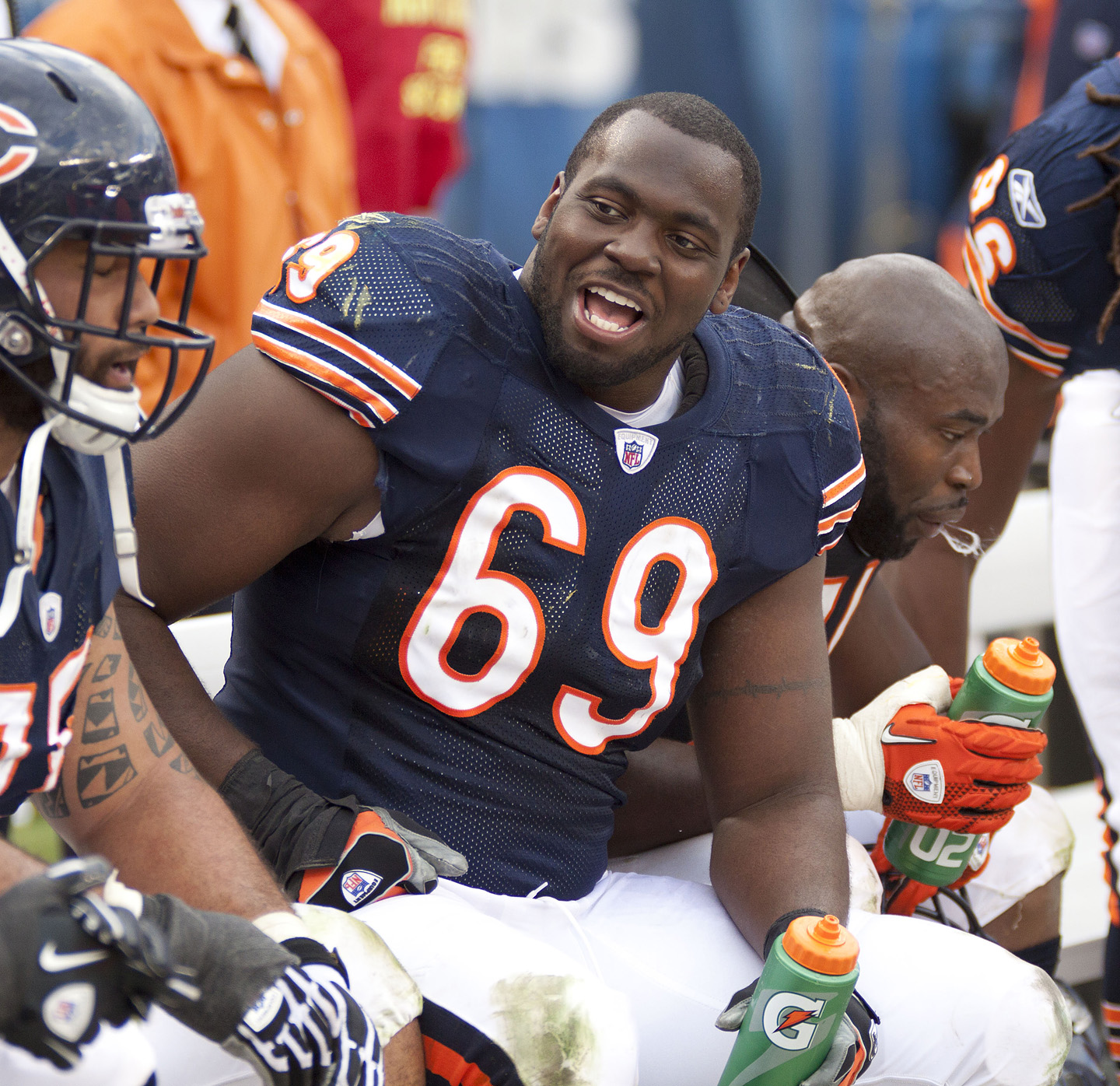
- Melton with the Chicago Bears in 2010

No. 69, 90
- Position: Defensive tackle

Personal information
- Born: October 11, 1986 (age 40); Desoto, Texas, U.S.
- Listed height: 6 ft 3 in (1.91 m)
- Listed weight: 290 lb (132 kg)

Career information
- High school: Grapevine (Grapevine, Texas)
- College: Texas
- NFL draft: 2009: 4th round, 105th overall pick

Career history
- Chicago Bears (2009–2013); Dallas Cowboys (2014); Tampa Bay Buccaneers (2015); Denver Broncos (2016)*
- * Offseason or practice squad member only

Awards and highlights
- Pro Bowl (2012); BCS national champion (2005)

Career NFL statistics
- Total tackles: 134
- Sacks: 22.5
- Forced fumbles: 3
- Fumble recoveries: 6
- Stats at Pro Football Reference

Henry James Melton (born October 11, 1986) is an American former professional football player who was a defensive end in the National Football League (NFL). He played college football for the Texas Longhorns, where he was a running back for the 2005 National Championship team, and also played on special teams. He was selected by the Chicago Bears in the fourth round of the 2009 NFL draft.

== Early life ==
While attending Grapevine High School Melton was a second-team "All-USA" selection by USA Today; he gained over 800 yards and scored eight touchdowns as a senior. He earned All-District (5-5A) honors as a junior while rushing for over 800 yards and 12 TDs and averaged 6.2 yards per carry in 2003. He also gained over 800 yards as a sophomore. He also lettered in baseball and track.

== College career ==
Melton's first appearance as a Longhorn was on September 3, 2005, against the Louisiana–Lafayette Ragin' Cajuns football. Melton was a backup running back in his first two seasons, according to Mike Lampe. He carried 132 times for 625 yards (4.7-yard average) and 16 touchdowns. In 2007, Melton switched to defensive tackle.

Over the summer prior to the 2007 Longhorn football season, Melton and teammate Sergio Kindle were arrested in separate incidents on charges of driving while intoxicated. Both players were suspended from the team for the first three games of the season. They were required to do community service and missed the first two days of practice in order to visit with a woman whose son was crippled by a drunk driver.

Melton became a starter in his senior season and had 29 tackles, 10 tackles for loss, and 4 sacks. As a backup defensive end as a junior, he made 11 tackles with one sack.

== Professional career ==
=== Pre-draft ===
Melton measured 6 ft 3 1/8 in (190.8 cm) tall and 269 lb (122 kg) and ran a 40-yard dash in 4.64 seconds at the University of Texas Pro Day. He bench pressed 225 pounds (102 kg) 23 times, had a vertical leap of 34 1/2 in (88 cm), and a broad jump of 10 ft 1 in (307 cm).

=== Chicago Bears ===
He was selected by the Chicago Bears in the fourth round (105th overall) of the 2009 NFL draft. On May 29, 2009, Melton agreed to terms on a four-year deal with the Bears. During a preseason game, he returned a kickoff for 20 yards. Melton registered his first NFL sack on Brett Favre during a Week 10 game against the Minnesota Vikings.

In 2011, Melton recorded a career-high 7 sacks, third most by a defensive tackle, behind Bengals' Geno Atkins and Raiders' Tommy Kelly, who had 7 1/2 sacks apiece. Melton and teammate and center Roberto Garza were eventually named to the USA Today All-Joe Team.

In 2012, during organized team activities (OTAs), Melton appeared in the backfield as a running back, resembling former Bears defensive lineman and fullback William Perry; Melton had not played running back since his days at Texas. In the season opener against the Indianapolis Colts, Melton sacked Andrew Luck twice as the Bears went on to win 41–21. On December 26, Melton was named to his first Pro Bowl. In the 2012 season, Melton recorded 32 tackles and six sacks, tied for third in the league among defensive tackles. On March 1, 2013, Melton was given the franchise tag by the Bears, worth $8.45 million.

In 2013, Melton was carted from the field during the third game on September 22, against the Pittsburgh Steelers, with a left knee injury. A Lachman test on the field was indicative of an anterior cruciate ligament injury, and an MRI was scheduled. On September 23, Melton was ruled out for the remainder of the 2013 season, and was placed on injured reserve four days later.

=== Dallas Cowboys ===
On March 18, 2014, Melton signed a 1-year contract along with incentives, including a team option for 3 more years with the Dallas Cowboys, hoping he could regain his Pro Bowl form. After missing the last 13 games of the 2013 season with a torn ACL, he struggled in training camp as his knee recovered and he worked through a groin strain. Although he began the season as a starter at defensive tackle, injuries forced him into a pass-rushing role, with Tyrone Crawford passing him on the depth chart. His production faded as the year went on and his season ended with a bone bruise on his right knee and being placed on the injured reserve list before the playoffs. He finished with 5 sacks (registered in the first 9 games), 20 tackles, 17 quarterback pressures, 4 passes defensed and 2 fumble recoveries. On February 14, 2015, the Cowboys declined to exercise the contract's three year option, allowing him to become a free agent on March 14, 2015.

=== Tampa Bay Buccaneers ===
On March 12, 2015, Melton agreed to terms and signed a one-year contract with the Tampa Bay Buccaneers, reuniting him with his old head coach Lovie Smith. He was a backup that was used at defensive tackle and defensive end, posting 30 tackles (second highest mark in his career), 2 sacks, 2 passes defensed and 2 fumble recoveries.

=== Denver Broncos ===
On August 21, 2016, Melton signed a one-year deal with the Denver Broncos. On September 3, 2016, he was released by the Broncos.

== NFL career statistics ==
Legend
**Bold**	Career high

=== Regular season ===
Year	Team	Games		Tackles					Interceptions					Fumbles			
Year	Team	GP	GS	Cmb	Solo	Ast	Sck	TFL	Int	Yds	TD	Lng	PD	FF	FR	Yds	TD
2010	CHI	16	0	16	13	3	2.5	2	0	0	0	0	1	1	1	0	0
2011	CHI	15	15	24	18	6	**7.0**	**11**	0	0	0	0	0	0	0	0	0
2012	CHI	14	14	**44**	**32**	**12**	6.0	9	0	0	0	0	0	**2**	0	0	0
2013	CHI	3	3	5	3	2	0.0	0	0	0	0	0	0	0	1	-1	0
2014	DAL	16	3	15	11	4	5.0	6	0	0	0	0	**4**	0	**2**	**1**	0
2015	TAM	16	1	30	18	**12**	2.0	1	0	0	0	0	2	0	**2**	0	0
		80	36	134	95	39	22.5	29	0	0	0	0	7	3	6	0	0

=== Postseason ===
Year	Team	Games		Tackles					Interceptions					Fumbles			
Year	Team	GP	GS	Cmb	Solo	Ast	Sck	TFL	Int	Yds	TD	Lng	PD	FF	FR	Yds	TD
2010	CHI	2	0	2	2	0	0.0	0	0	0	0	0	0	0	0	0	0
		2	0	2	2	0	0.0	0	0	0	0	0	0	0	0	0	0

== Personal life ==
On June 1, 2007, while a Junior at the University of Texas, Melton was arrested and charged with intoxicated driving in downtown Austin, Texas.

In 2013, Melton was involved in an altercation at a bar in the Dallas area, but the criminal charges were ultimately dropped by the prosecution.
