= Ronald Patrick =

American football player (born 1991)

No. 67, 65, 78, 60, 62, 72, 71
- Position: Center

Personal information
- Born: November 1, 1991 (age 35); Cocoa, Florida, U.S.
- Listed height: 6 ft 1 in (1.85 m)
- Listed weight: 310 lb (141 kg)

Career information
- High school: Cocoa (FL)
- College: South Carolina
- NFL draft: 2014: undrafted

Career history
- Dallas Cowboys (2014)*; Pittsburgh Steelers (2014)*; Carolina Panthers (2015)*; Dallas Cowboys (2015)*; Cleveland Browns (2015)*; Buffalo Bills (2015–2016)*; Tennessee Titans (2016)*; Washington Redskins (2016–2017)*; Orlando Apollos (2019); DC Defenders (2020)*
- * Offseason or practice squad member only
- Stats at Pro Football Reference

Ronald Patrick Jr. (born November 1, 1991) is an American former football center. He played college football at the University of South Carolina.

== Early life ==
Patrick attended Cocoa High School. He accepted a football scholarship from the University of South Carolina.

== Professional career ==
=== Dallas Cowboys ===
Patrick was signed as an undrafted free agent by the Dallas Cowboys after the 2014 NFL draft on May 12. He was waived on August 30, 2014 and was signed to the practice squad the next day. He was released on September 30, 2014.

=== Pittsburgh Steelers ===
On December 17, 2014, Patrick was signed to the Pittsburgh Steelers' practice squad.

=== Carolina Panthers ===
On May 11, 2015, Patrick was signed by the Carolina Panthers. On June 17, 2015, he was waived by the Panthers.

=== Dallas Cowboys (second stint) ===
On July 28, 2015, Patrick was signed by the Dallas Cowboys. On September 5, 2015, he was waived by the Cowboys. On September 16, 2015, he was signed to the Cowboys' practice squad. On September 29, 2015, Patrick was released by the Cowboys.

=== Cleveland Browns ===
On October 5, 2015, Patrick was signed to the Cleveland Browns' practice squad. On December 1, 2015, he was released from practice squad.

=== Buffalo Bills ===
On December 9, 2015, Patrick was signed to the Buffalo Bills' practice squad. He was released on May 2, 2016.

=== Tennessee Titans ===
On July 29, 2016, Patrick was signed by the Tennessee Titans. On September 2, 2016, he was released by the Titans as part of final roster cuts and was signed to the practice squad the next day. He was released on September 13, 2016.

=== Washington Redskins ===
Patrick was signed to the Washington Redskins' practice squad on September 21, 2016. He signed a futures contract with the Redskins on January 2, 2017.

On September 2, 2017, Patrick was waived by the Redskins.

=== AAF and XFL ===
In 2019, Patrick joined the Orlando Apollos of the Alliance of American Football. The league ceased operations in April 2019.

Patrick later joined the XFL, being selected in the 2020 XFL draft by the DC Defenders. He was waived during final roster cuts on January 22, 2020.
