= Darrion Weems =

American football player (born 1988)

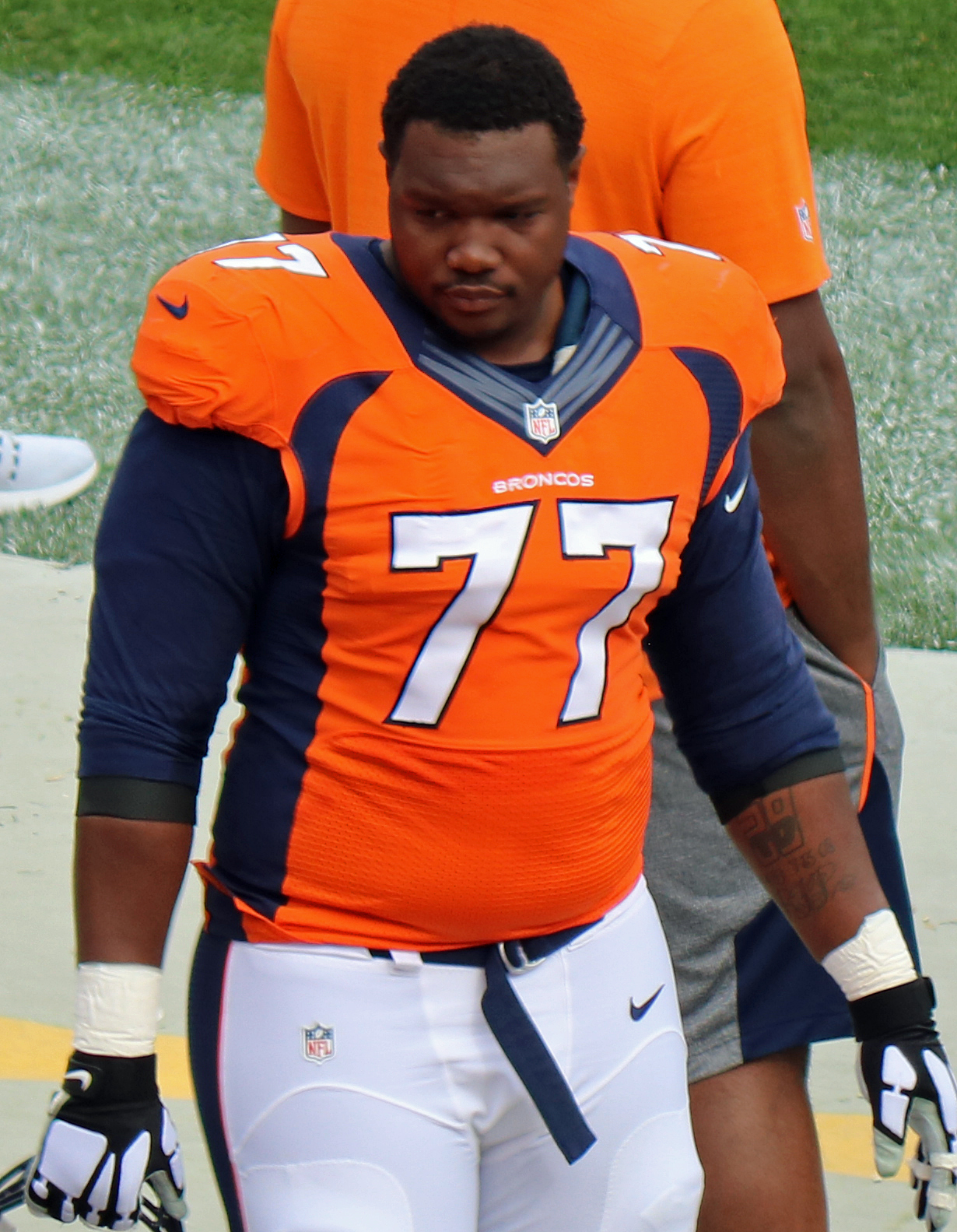
- Weems in the 2016 NFL season.

No. 75, 77
- Position: Offensive tackle

Personal information
- Born: September 4, 1988 (age 38); Winnetka, California, U.S.
- Listed height: 6 ft 5 in (1.96 m)
- Listed weight: 310 lb (141 kg)

Career information
- High school: William Howard Taft (Woodland Hills, California)
- College: Oregon
- NFL draft: 2012: undrafted

Career history
- Minnesota Vikings (2012)*; New England Patriots (2012)*; Indianapolis Colts (2012)*; Denver Broncos (2012)*; Dallas Cowboys (2012–2015); Denver Broncos (2016)
- * Offseason or practice squad member only

Career NFL statistics
- Games played: 7
- Stats at Pro Football Reference

Darrion Anthony Weems (born September 4, 1988) is an American former professional football player who was an offensive tackle in the National Football League (NFL). Weems played for the Dallas Cowboys and Denver Broncos. He played college football for the Oregon Ducks. After football, he became an investor and TV producer.

== Early life ==
Weems attended McMain High School, but was forced to move before his junior year due to Hurricane Katrina. He transferred to Taft High School, where he was named All-American.

He accepted a scholarship from the University of Oregon. As a junior, he started 7 games at both tackle positions. He became a regular starter at left tackle as a senior and was part of an offense that ranked third in the nation in scoring, sixth in total offense, and fifth in rushing.

== Professional career ==
=== Minnesota Vikings ===
On April 29, 2012, he signed with the Minnesota Vikings as an undrafted free agent.

=== New England Patriots ===
On July 27, 2012, he signed with the New England Patriots as a free agent.

=== Indianapolis Colts ===
On September 3, 2012, he was signed by the Indianapolis Colts to join their practice squad.

=== Denver Broncos (first stint) ===
On October 2, 2012, he was signed by the Denver Broncos.

=== Dallas Cowboys ===
On December 5, 2012, he was signed by the Dallas Cowboys from the Denver Broncos' practice squad and was declared inactive in the last 4 games. The next year, he was declared inactive for all of the regular season games. In 2014, he missed most of the preseason with a shoulder injury and was placed on the injured reserve list on September 17.

In 2015, the team lost Jermey Parnell in free agency, and Weems entered training camp as the favorite to earn the swing tackle job.

=== Denver Broncos (second stint) ===
On January 13, 2016, he was signed by the Denver Broncos to a future contract. He appeared in 6 games at right guard. He decided to retire soon after due to a concussion.
