= Ben Gardner =

American football player (born 1991)

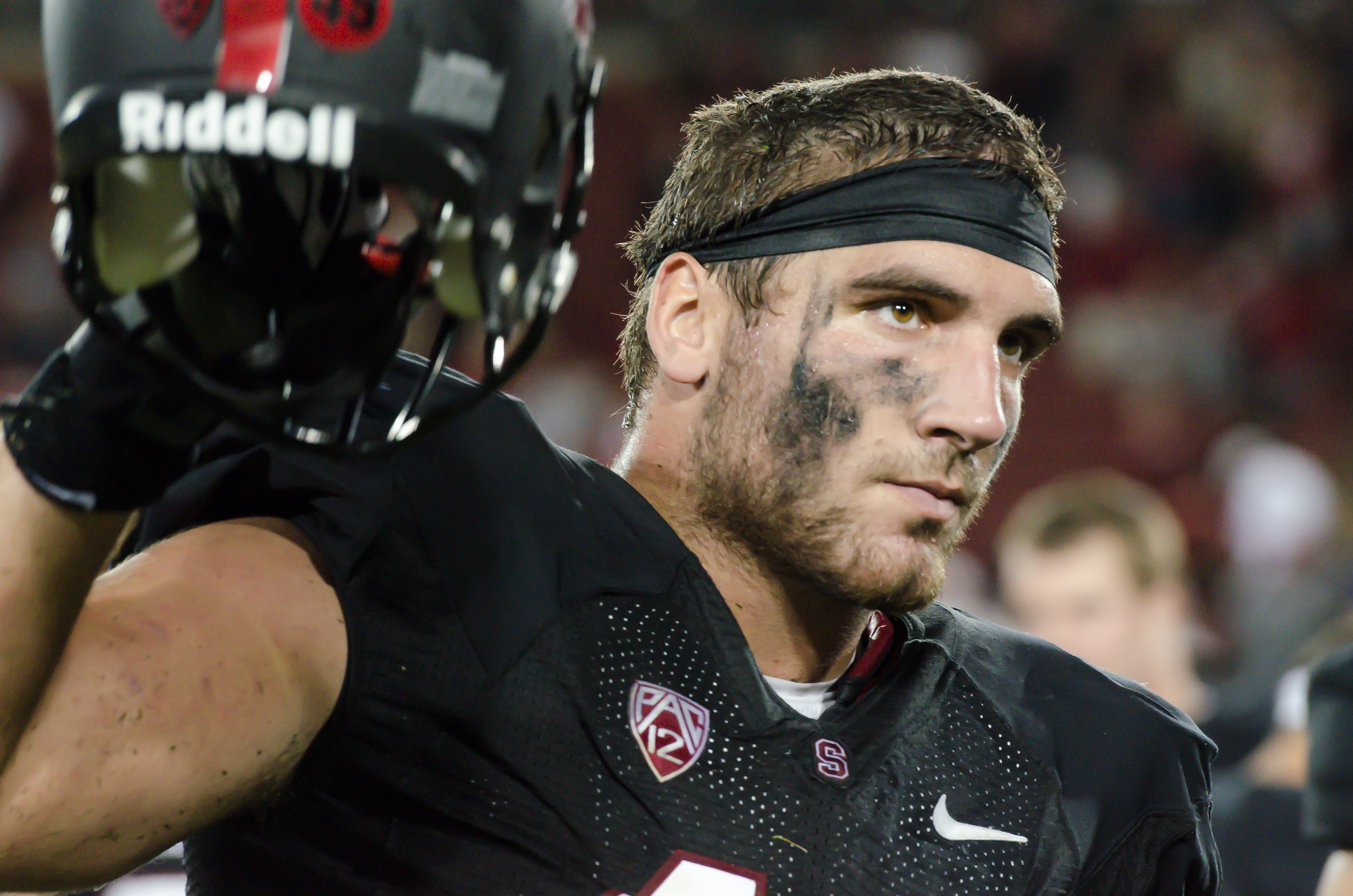
- Gardner with Stanford in 2013

No. 71, 49
- Position: Linebacker

Personal information
- Born: April 29, 1991 (age 35); Portland, Oregon, U.S.
- Listed height: 6 ft 4 in (1.93 m)
- Listed weight: 270 lb (122 kg)

Career information
- High school: Homestead (Mequon, Wisconsin)
- College: Stanford
- NFL draft: 2014: 7th round, 231st overall pick

Career history
- Dallas Cowboys (2014); San Diego Chargers (2015–2016)*
- * Offseason or practice squad member only

Awards and highlights
- First-team All-Pac-12 (2013); 2× Second-team All-Pac-12 (2011, 2012)
- Stats at Pro Football Reference

Benjamin David Gardner (born April 29, 1991) is an American former football linebacker. He played college football for the Stanford Cardinal and was selected by the Dallas Cowboys in the seventh round of the 2014 NFL draft. He was also a member of the San Diego Chargers.

== Early life ==
Gardner graduated in 2009 from Homestead High School. As a senior in 2008–09, Gardner was a team captain and defensive end on the football team which won the Wisconsin Division I state championship.

He received numerous top honors including 2008 Associated Press 1st-team All-State; 2008 WFCA 1st-Team All-State; 2008 all-North Shore Conference First; and 2008 North Shore Conference Defensive Player of the Year.

== College career ==
Stanford Cardinal football is known for its 3–4 defense schemes, more typically seen in the NFL. Gardner was a three-year starter at defensive end in the Stanford 3–4 system, which was ranked among the nation's top defensive units.

Gardner did not see field action in his first year (2009). As a sophomore or "redshirt freshman" in 2010, Gardner saw action in 11 games on special teams and as a second-string defensive end. He logged three tackles, including two tackles for loss and one sack.

In 2011, he started 12 of 13 games, including the Fiesta Bowl vs. 13th nationally ranked Oklahoma state. Gardner recorded 35 tackles, 10 tackles for loss and 4.5 sacks. He was named to the All-Pac-12 Conference 2nd Team, and received Stanford's Deswarte-Eller Award honoring the most outstanding (redshirt) sophomore. Gardner ranked 13th in the Pac-12 in tackles for loss per game, and 16th in sacks per game. He had a season-high five tackles and one sack vs. California and a season-high 2.5 tackles for loss vs. Arizona.

Gardner started all 14 games of the 2012 season, including the Pac-12 Championship Game vs. UCLA and the 2013 Rose Bowl vs. Wisconsin. Gardner tied for second on the Stanford team with 14.5 tackles for loss and 7.5 sacks. He also ranked among the nation's top 75 in both categories. Against #2-ranked USC, Gardner won Pac-12 Defensive Player of the Week honors for registering 6 tackles, 3.5 tackles for loss and one sack, holding USC to 26 rushing yards. Playing at #7-ranked Notre Dame, Gardner made two solo tackles, one fumble recovery, and one sack which caused a fumble that was recovered for a Stanford touchdown. Gardner's season also included 49 tackles, 5 passes broken up, and 2 quarterback hurries.

He chose to return to Stanford for a fifth year in 2013, rather than enter the NFL draft, but it ended early because of a torn pectoral muscle he suffered against Oregon State University.

== Professional career ==
=== Dallas Cowboys ===
Gardner was selected in the seventh round (231 overall) of the 2014 NFL draft by the Dallas Cowboys. On August 26, he was placed on the injured reserve list after having surgery to repair torn ligaments in his left shoulder. The next year, the team brought in new talent at the defensive end position (Greg Hardy, Randy Gregory, Ryan Russell) and he was eventually waived on September 5, 2015.

=== San Diego Chargers ===
On November 4, 2015, Gardner was signed to the San Diego Chargers practice squad and switched to play outside linebacker in a 3-4 defense. On September 3, 2016, he was cut by the Chargers. The next day, he was signed to the Chargers' practice squad. He was released on October 4.
