= Kenneth Boatright =

American football player (born 1990)

- Boatright with the Dallas Cowboys in 2014

No. 79
- Position: Defensive end

Personal information
- Born: March 6, 1990 (age 36); Joliet, Illinois, U.S.
- Listed height: 6 ft 3 in (1.91 m)
- Listed weight: 250 lb (113 kg)

Career information
- High school: Bolingbrook (IL)
- College: Southern Illinois
- NFL draft: 2013: undrafted

Career history
- Seattle Seahawks (2013); Dallas Cowboys (2014–2015); BC Lions (2017)

Awards and highlights
- Super Bowl champion (XLVIII); Third-team All-American (2012); All-MVFC (2012)

Career NFL statistics
- Games played: 1
- Total tackles: 1
- Stats at Pro Football Reference
- Stats at CFL.ca

Kenneth Boatright (born March 6, 1990) is an American former professional football player who was a defensive end in the National Football League (NFL). He was also a member of the BC Lions in the Canadian Football League (CFL). He played college football for the Southern Illinois Salukis.

== Early life ==
Boatright attended Bolingbrook High School. As a senior, he helped the team win the conference championship (9-3 record) and reach the second round of the playoffs.

He also practiced track and volleyball.

== College career ==
Boatright accepted a football scholarship from NAIA Midland University. As a freshman free safety, he tallied 39 tackles and one sack.

As a sophomore, he registered 82 tackles (second on the team), 2 sacks, 2 interceptions, 11 pass breakups and one blocked a punt. He received honorable-mention All-Conference honors. He transferred after the season to Southern Illinois University.

In 2010, he was redshirted and converted him into a defensive end. As a junior, he collected 6.5 sacks (led the team and eighth in the conference), 13.5 tackles for loss (led the team and fourth in the conference) and 2 fumble recoveries.

As a senior, he posted 62 tackles (third on the team), 5.5 sacks (led the team and seventh in the conference), 10 quarterback hurries (led the team), 13.5 tackles for loss (led the team and third in the conference). He contributed to the defense finishing 10th in the nation in rushing defense (111.27 yards per game). He made a career-high 8 tackles against Southeast Missouri State University. He had 6 tackles (2.5 for loss) and 2 sacks against Indiana State University. He blocked a punt and recovered it for a touchdown against the University of Northern Iowa.

== Professional career ==
Pre-draft measurables
| Height | Weight | Arm length | Hand span | Wingspan | 40-yard dash | 10-yard split | 20-yard split | 20-yard shuttle | Three-cone drill | Vertical jump | Broad jump | Bench press |
|---|---|---|---|---|---|---|---|---|---|---|---|---|
| 6 ft 2 7/8 in (1.90 m) | 254 lb (115 kg) | 34 7/8 in (0.89 m) | 9 7/8 in (0.25 m) | 6 ft 9 1/4 in (2.06 m) | 4.77 s | 1.64 s | 2.79 s | 4.27 s | 7.17 s | 34.5 in (0.88 m) | 9 ft 11 in (3.02 m) | 22 reps |
All values from Pro Day

=== Seattle Seahawks ===
Boatright was signed as an undrafted free agent by the Seattle Seahawks after the 2013 NFL draft on April 27. On August 2, he was waived with a shoulder injury and was placed on the injured reserve list the following day. He was cut on June 16, 2014.

=== Dallas Cowboys ===
On August 1, 2014, he was signed as a free agent by the Dallas Cowboys. He was released on August 30 and signed to the practice squad one day later. On December 13, he was promoted to the active roster.

On September 1, 2015, he was waived with a career threatening neck injury by the Cowboys. On the following day, he cleared waivers and was reverted to the team's injured reserve list. He was released on May 6, 2016.

=== BC Lions (CFL) ===
On February 21, 2017, Boatright signed with the BC Lions of the Canadian Football League. He was released on October 3.

== Personal life ==
Boatright is one of 12 children in his family.
