= Josh Aladenoye =

American gridiron football player (born 1990)

No. 69
- Position: Offensive lineman

Personal information
- Born: September 26, 1990 (age 36); Mesquite, Texas, U.S.
- Listed height: 6 ft 6 in (1.98 m)
- Listed weight: 325 lb (147 kg)

Career information
- High school: North Mesquite HS
- College: Illinois State

Career history
- 2014: Dallas Cowboys
- 2015: BC Lions
- Stats at CFL.ca (archive)

Josh Aladenoye (born September 26, 1990) is an American former Canadian football offensive lineman for the BC Lions of the Canadian Football League (CFL). He previously attended Illinois State University where he played college football for the Redbirds and studied Marketing and Communications.

== Early career ==
Aladenoye played high school football for North Mesquite High School, where he was selected to the all-district team twice. He was ranked as the 36th offensive tackle prospect by Scout.com. Aladenoye committed to attend the University of Oklahoma and play for the Sooners in June 2008 as part of their recruiting class of 2009. He redshirted in 2009. After appearing in 12 games in 2010 at the offensive line, Aladenoye was considered to start as the Sooners' right tackle in 2011 following an injury to Jarvis Jones. He later switched to the defensive tackle position. Aladenoye played 17 games with the Sooners over two years.

Aladenoye committed to transfer to Illinois State for his remaining two years of eligibility. He was selected to the Missouri Valley Football Conference (MVFC) All-Newcomer team in 2012 and was on the offensive line that allowed only 14 sacks on the season. Aladenoye was also selected as a preseason first-team All-MVFC and second-team All-MVFC in 2013. He started all 24 games in two years with the Redbirds as a left tackle.

== Professional career ==
=== Dallas Cowboys ===
Aladenoye was eligible for the 2014 NFL draft but went undrafted. The Miami Dolphins, Seattle Seahawks, and San Francisco 49ers expressed interest prior to Aladenoye signing as a free agent with the Dallas Cowboys. He was released in the final round of cuts before the start of the regular season.

=== BC Lions ===
Aladenoye was signed by the BC Lions in late May 2015. He was placed on the practice roster at the end of the pre-season. Following a dispute with head coach Jeff Tedford, Aladenoye was released in August. He returned a week later following an injury to left tackle Tommie Draheim, and made his CFL debut at that position on August 20 against the Montreal Alouettes.
