= 2017 Dallas Cowboys season =

58th season in franchise history

- Owner: Jerry Jones
- General manager: Jerry Jones
- Head coach: Jason Garrett
- Home stadium: AT&T Stadium

Results
- Record: 9–7
- Division place: 2nd NFC East
- Playoffs: Did not qualify
- All-Pros: OG Zack Martin "(2nd Team)"; DE DeMarcus Lawrence "(2nd Team)"
- Pro Bowlers: C Travis Frederick; DE DeMarcus Lawrence; RG Zack Martin; OT Tyron Smith; TE Jason Witten

Uniform
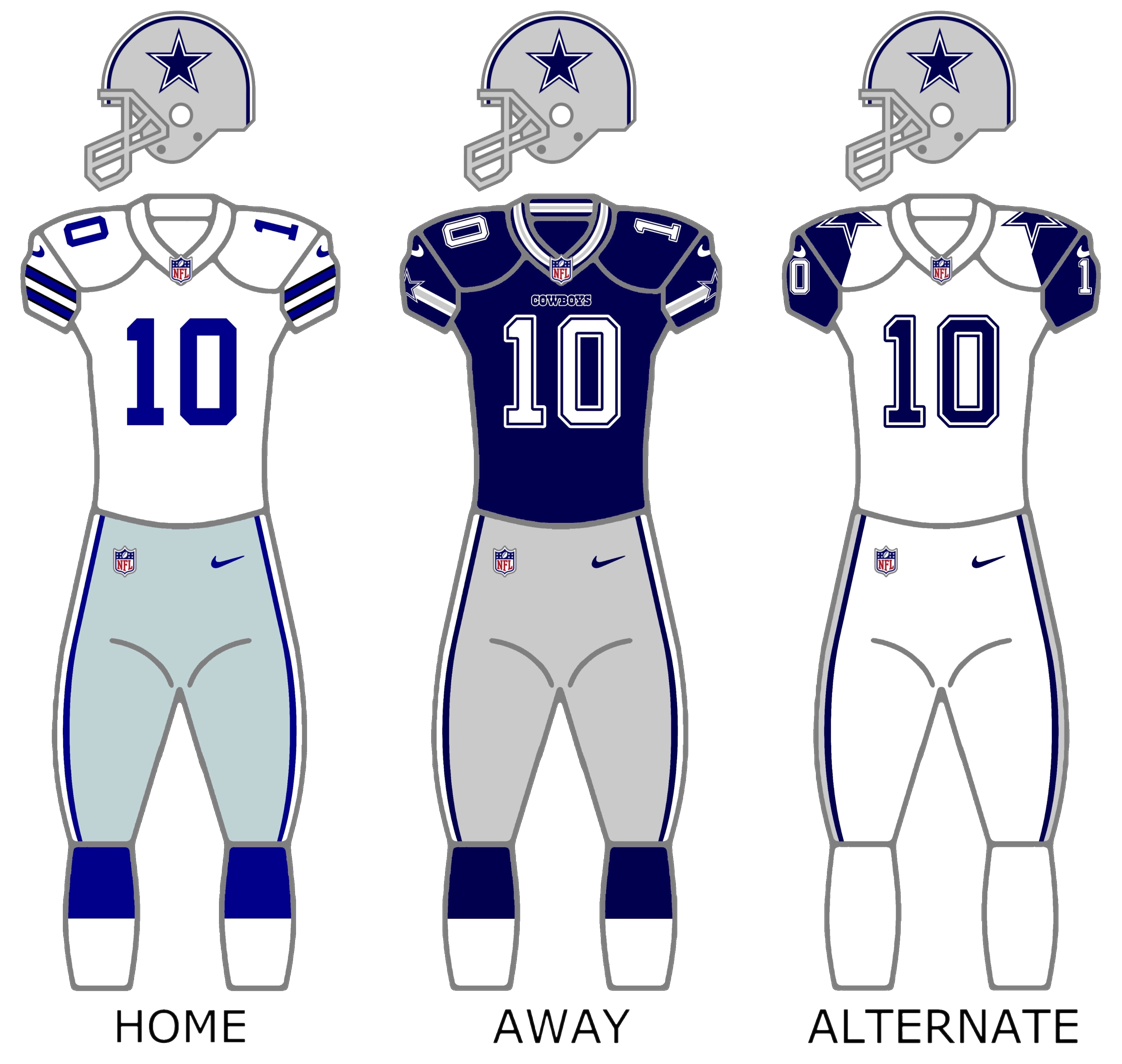

The 2017 season was the Dallas Cowboys' 58th in the National Football League (NFL), their 29th under the ownership of Jerry Jones, their 9th playing their home games at AT&T Stadium, and their 7th full season under head coach Jason Garrett.

For the first time since 2002, quarterback Tony Romo was not on the opening day roster, as he announced his retirement on April 4, 2017. The Cowboys also failed to improve or match upon their 13–3 record from the previous season. In Week 16 via a loss at home to the Seattle Seahawks, they were eliminated from playoff contention and missed the playoffs, for the sixth time in the last eight seasons.

== Offseason ==
=== Signings ===
Position	Player	Age	2016 Team	Contract
WR	Terrance Williams	27	Dallas Cowboys	4 years, $17 million
CB	Nolan Carroll(†)	30	Philadelphia Eagles	3 years, $10 million
OG	Byron Bell	28	Tennessee Titans	1 year, $2 million
DT	Stephen Paea(††)	28	Cleveland Browns	1 year, $2 million
DE	Damontre Moore(†)	24	Seattle Seahawks	2 years, $1.6 million
RB	Darren McFadden(††)	29	Dallas Cowboys	1 year, $980,000
OG	Jonathan Cooper	27	Cleveland Browns	1 year, $2 million
LB	Justin Durant (†)	31	Dallas Cowboys	1 year, $615,000
QB	Kellen Moore	27	Dallas Cowboys	1 year, $775,000

- (†) - Later released
- (††) - Later retired

=== Departures ===
Position	Player	Age	2017 Team
QB	Tony Romo	37	Retired
QB	Mark Sanchez	30	Chicago Bears
RB	Lance Dunbar	27	Los Angeles Rams
WR	Lucky Whitehead	25	New York Jets
TE	Gavin Escobar	26	Baltimore Ravens
OG	Ronald Leary	27	Denver Broncos
OG/OT	Emmett Cleary	27	Detroit Lions
OT	Doug Free	33	Retired
DE	Ryan Davis	28	Buffalo Bills
DT	Jack Crawford	28	Atlanta Falcons
DT	Terrell McClain	28	Washington Redskins
LB	Rolando McClain	27	Unsigned
LB	Andrew Gachkar	28	Carolina Panthers
CB	Josh Thomas	27	Unsigned
CB	Brandon Carr	30	Baltimore Ravens
CB	Morris Claiborne	27	New York Jets
SS	Barry Church	29	Jacksonville Jaguars
FS	J.J. Wilcox	26	Pittsburgh Steelers

=== Draft ===
2017 Dallas Cowboys draft
Round	Pick	Player	Position	College	Notes
1	28	Taco Charlton	DE	Michigan	
2	60	Chidobe Awuzie	CB	Colorado	
3	92	Jourdan Lewis	CB	Michigan	
4	133	Ryan Switzer	WR	North Carolina	
6	191	Xavier Woods	S	Louisiana Tech	
6	216	Marquez White	CB	Florida State	
7	228	Joey Ivie	DT	Florida	
7	239	Noah Brown	WR	Ohio State	
7	246	Jordan Carrell	DE	Colorado	
Made roster † Pro Football Hall of Fame * Made at least one Pro Bowl during career

Notes

- The Cowboys traded their original fifth-round (No. 171 overall) selection to the Buffalo Bills in exchange for a seventh-round (No. 228 overall) selection and quarterback Matt Cassell.
- The Cowboys traded their 2018 fifth-round selection to the New York Jets in exchange for a 2017 sixth-round (No. 191 overall) selection.
- The Cowboys traded their original sixth-round (No. 211 overall) selection to the New England Patriots in exchange for sixth (No. 216 overall) and seventh-round (No. 239 overall) selections.

=== Undrafted free agents ===
Name	Position	College
Woody Baron	Defensive end	Virginia Tech
Kennan Gilchrist	Linebacker	Appalachian State
Blake Jarwin	Tight end	Oklahoma State
Joseph Jones	Linebacker	Northwestern
Lance Lenoir	Wide receiver	Western Illinois
Lewis Neal	Defensive tackle	LSU
Cooper Rush	Quarterback	Central Michigan
Dan Skipper	Tackle	Arkansas
Lucas Wacha	Linebacker	Wyoming

== Staff ==
2017 Dallas Cowboys staff
Front office: Owner/president/general manager – Jerry Jones; COO/executive vice president/director of player personnel – Stephen Jones; Senior director of football operations/football administration – Todd Williams; Director of salary cap & player contracts – Adam Prasifka; Vice president player personnel – Will McClay; Senior executive, college scouting – Tom Ciskowski; Director of college scouting – Lionel Vital; Director of pro scouting – Alex Loomis; Assistant director of college scouting – Chris Hall; Director of football research – Tom Robinson; Head coaches: Head coach – Jason Garrett; Assistant head coach/special teams coordinator – Rich Bisaccia; Offensive coaches: Offensive coordinator – Scott Linehan; Quarterbacks – Wade Wilson; Running backs – Gary Brown; Wide receivers – Derek Dooley; Assistant wide receivers – Kyle Valero; Tight ends – Steve Loney; Offensive line – Frank Pollack; Assistant offensive line – Marc Colombo; Offensive assistant – Stephen Brown	Defensive coaches: Defensive coordinator/defensive line – Rod Marinelli; Defensive tackle – Leon Lett; Linebackers/pass game coordinator – Matt Eberflus; Secondary – Joe Baker; Safeties – Greg Jackson; Defensive assistant – Turner West; Special teams coaches: Assistant special teams – Keith O'Quinn; Strength and conditioning: Strength and conditioning – Mike Woicik; Assistant strength and conditioning – Brett Bech; Assistant strength and conditioning – Kendall Smith

== Rosters ==
=== Opening preseason roster ===
Dallas Cowboys 2017 opening preseason roster
Quarterbacks: 3 Luke McCown; 17 Kellen Moore; 4 Dak Prescott; 7 Cooper Rush; Running backs: 21 Ezekiel Elliott; 37 Ronnie Hillman; 20 Darren McFadden; 46 Alfred Morris; 41 Keith Smith FB; 45 Rod Smith RB/FB; Wide receivers: 11 Cole Beasley; 18 Brian Brown; 85 Noah Brown; 88 Dez Bryant; 19 Brice Butler; 15 Javontee Herndon; 81 Andy Jones; 14 Lance Lenoir; 16 Uzoma Nwachukwu; 10 Ryan Switzer; 83 Terrance Williams; Tight ends: 80 Rico Gathers; 86 Connor Hamlett; 84 James Hanna; 89 Blake Jarwin; 87 Geoff Swaim; 82 Jason Witten	Offensive linemen: 75 Byron Bell T/G; 61 Ross Burbank C; 62 Ruben Carter G/C; 63 Emmett Cleary T/G; 71 La'el Collins T/G; 64 Jonathan Cooper G/C; 67 Clay DeBord T/G; 78 Kadeem Edwards T/G; 72 Travis Frederick C; 79 Chaz Green G/T; 73 Joe Looney C/G; 70 Zack Martin G; 60 Dan Skipper T/G; 77 Tyron Smith T; 65 Nate Theaker G; Defensive linemen: 76 Richard Ash DT/DE; 68 Woody Baron DE/DT; 69 Jordan Carrell DT; 97 Taco Charlton DE; 96 Maliek Collins DT; 98 Tyrone Crawford DE/DT; 95 David Irving DT/DE; 74 Joey Ivie DT; 56 Lenny Jones DE; 90 DeMarcus Lawrence DE; 93 Benson Mayowa DE; 58 Damontre Moore DE; 66 Lewis Neal DE/DT; 55 Stephen Paea DT; 99 Charles Tapper DE; 92 Cedric Thornton DT	Linebackers: 48 Kennan Gilchrist OLB; 59 Anthony Hitchens MLB; 43 Joseph Jones MLB/OLB; 50 Sean Lee OLB; 40 Darnell Leslie OLB; 47 John Lotulelei MLB/OLB; 53 Mark Nzeocha MLB/OLB; 54 Jaylon Smith MLB; 44 Lucas Wacha OLB; 51 Kyle Wilber OLB/MLB; 57 Damien Wilson OLB/MLB; Defensive backs: 33 Chidobe Awuzie CB/FS; 36 Robert Blanton SS; 30 Anthony Brown CB; 24 Nolan Carroll CB; 35 Kavon Frazier SS; 38 Jeff Heath SS/FS; 31 Byron Jones FS; 27 Jourdan Lewis CB; 23 Leon McFadden CB; 32 Orlando Scandrick CB; 29 Sammy Seamster CB; 28 Jameill Showers FS/SS; 26 Duke Thomas CB; 39 Marquez White CB; 25 Xavier Woods FS/SS; Special teams: 5 Dan Bailey K; 2 Sam Irwin-Hill P/K; 6 Chris Jones P; 91 L. P. Ladouceur LS; 49 Zach Wood LS	Reserve lists: 52 Justin Durant MLB/OLB (Active/NF-Inj.); -- Zac Dysert QB (IR); 94 Randy Gregory DE (Susp.); 34 Jahad Thomas RB (IR); 90 active, 3 inactive

=== Week one roster ===
Dallas Cowboys 2017 week one roster
Quarterbacks: 17 Kellen Moore; 4 Dak Prescott; 7 Cooper Rush; Running backs: 21 Ezekiel Elliott; 20 Darren McFadden; 46 Alfred Morris; 41 Keith Smith FB; 45 Rod Smith RB/FB; Wide receivers: 11 Cole Beasley; 85 Noah Brown; 88 Dez Bryant; 19 Brice Butler; 10 Ryan Switzer; 83 Terrance Williams; Tight ends: 84 James Hanna; 87 Geoff Swaim; 82 Jason Witten	Offensive linemen: 75 Byron Bell T/G; 71 La'el Collins T/G; 64 Jonathan Cooper G/C; 72 Travis Frederick C; 79 Chaz Green G/T; 73 Joe Looney C/G; 70 Zack Martin G; 77 Tyron Smith T; Defensive linemen: 97 Taco Charlton DE; 96 Maliek Collins DT; 98 Tyrone Crawford DE/DT; 90 DeMarcus Lawrence DE; 93 Benson Mayowa DE; 55 Stephen Paea DT; 92 Brian Price DT; 99 Charles Tapper DE	Linebackers: 52 Justin Durant MLB/OLB; 56 Jayrone Elliott OLB; 59 Anthony Hitchens MLB; 50 Sean Lee OLB; 54 Jaylon Smith MLB; 51 Kyle Wilber OLB/MLB; 57 Damien Wilson OLB/MLB; Defensive backs: 33 Chidobe Awuzie CB/FS; 23 Bené Benwikere CB; 30 Anthony Brown CB; 24 Nolan Carroll CB; 35 Kavon Frazier SS; 38 Jeff Heath SS/FS; 31 Byron Jones FS; 27 Jourdan Lewis CB; 32 Orlando Scandrick CB; 25 Xavier Woods FS/SS; Special teams: 5 Dan Bailey K; 6 Chris Jones P; 91 L. P. Ladouceur LS	Reserve lists: -- Zac Dysert QB (IR); 80 Rico Gathers TE (IR); 94 Randy Gregory DE (Susp.); 95 David Irving DT/DE (Susp.); 58 Damontre Moore DE (Susp.); 26 Duke Thomas CB (IR); Practice Squad: 76 Richard Ash DT/DE; 78 Kadeem Edwards T/G; 89 Blake Jarwin TE; 14 Lance Lenoir WR; 66 Lewis Neal DT/DE; 53 Mark Nzeocha MLB/OLB; 28 Jameill Showers FS/SS; 60 Dan Skipper T/G; 65 Nate Theaker G; 39 Marquez White CB; 53 Active, 6 Inactive, 10 practice squad

=== Final roster ===
2017 Dallas Cowboys roster
Quarterbacks (QB): 4 Dak Prescott; 7 Cooper Rush; Running backs (RB): 21 Ezekiel Elliott; 46 Alfred Morris; 41 Keith Smith FB; 45 Rod Smith; Wide receivers (WR): 11 Cole Beasley; 85 Noah Brown; 88 Dez Bryant; 19 Brice Butler; 14 Lance Lenoir; 10 Ryan Switzer; 83 Terrance Williams; Tight ends (TE): 84 James Hanna; 89 Blake Jarwin; 87 Geoff Swaim; 82 Jason Witten	Offensive linemen (OL): 75 Byron Bell T; 71 La'el Collins T; 64 Jonathan Cooper G; 78 Kadeem Edwards G; 72 Travis Frederick C; 79 Chaz Green G/T; 73 Joe Looney C/G; 70 Zack Martin G; Defensive linemen (DL): 76 Richard Ash DT; 97 Taco Charlton DE; 96 Maliek Collins DT; 98 Tyrone Crawford DE; 95 David Irving DT; 56 Datone Jones DT; 90 DeMarcus Lawrence DE; 93 Benson Mayowa DE; 66 Lewis Neal DT; 68 Daniel Ross DT	Linebackers (LB): 59 Anthony Hitchens MLB; 58 Tre'Von Johnson MLB; 50 Sean Lee OLB; 53 Justin March-Lillard OLB; 54 Jaylon Smith MLB; 51 Kyle Wilber OLB; 57 Damien Wilson OLB; Defensive backs (DB): 33 Chidobe Awuzie CB; 23 Bené Benwikere CB; 30 Anthony Brown CB; 35 Kavon Frazier SS; 38 Jeff Heath SS; 31 Byron Jones FS; 27 Jourdan Lewis CB; 25 Xavier Woods S; Special teams (ST): 5 Dan Bailey K; 6 Chris Jones P; 91 L. P. Ladouceur LS	Practice squad: 18 Brian Brown WR; 81 K. D. Cannon WR; 62 Jarron Jones T; 17 Kellen Moore QB; 28 Jameill Showers SS; 67 Joe Vellano DT; 39 Marquez White CB; 34 Trey Williams RB; Reserve: 3 Zac Dysert QB (IR); 80 Rico Gathers TE (IR); 94 Randy Gregory DE (Susp.); 55 Stephen Paea DT (IR); 92 Brian Price DT (IR); 32 Orlando Scandrick CB (IR); 77 Tyron Smith T (IR); 99 Charles Tapper DE (IR); 26 Duke Thomas CB (IR); Rookies in italics 53 active, 9 reserve, 8 practice squad

== Preseason ==
Week	Date	Opponent	Result	Record	Game site	NFL.com recap
HOF	August 3	vs. Arizona Cardinals	W 20–18	1–0	Tom Benson Hall of Fame Stadium (Canton, Ohio)	Recap
1	August 12	at Los Angeles Rams	L 10–13	1–1	Los Angeles Memorial Coliseum	Recap
2	August 19	Indianapolis Colts	W 24–19	2–1	AT&T Stadium	Recap
3	August 26	Oakland Raiders	W 24–20	3–1	AT&T Stadium	Recap
4	August 31	at Houston Texans	Cancelled due to Hurricane Harvey †			

† The game was originally scheduled for August 31, and to be moved from its original venue, NRG Stadium, to the Cowboys' AT&T Stadium, due to public safety concerns regarding flooding in the Houston area from the remnants of Hurricane Harvey. However, the game was later cancelled in order to allow Texans' players and coaches to return to Houston after the storm. Instead, the Cowboys held a public practice session as well as a telethon to raise money for the relief efforts.

== Regular season ==
=== Schedule ===
Week	Date	Opponent	Result	Record	Game site	NFL.com recap
1	September 10	**New York Giants**	**W** 19–3	1–0	AT&T Stadium	Recap
2	September 17	at Denver Broncos	**L** 17–42	1–1	Sports Authority Field at Mile High	Recap
3	September 25	at Arizona Cardinals	**W** 28–17	2–1	University of Phoenix Stadium	Recap
4	October 1	Los Angeles Rams	**L** 30–35	2–2	AT&T Stadium	Recap
5	October 8	Green Bay Packers	**L** 31–35	2–3	AT&T Stadium	Recap
6	Bye					
7	October 22	at San Francisco 49ers	**W** 40–10	3–3	Levi's Stadium	Recap
8	October 29	at **Washington Redskins**	**W** 33–19	4–3	FedExField	Recap
9	November 5	Kansas City Chiefs	**W** 28–17	5–3	AT&T Stadium	Recap
10	November 12	at Atlanta Falcons	**L** 7–27	5–4	Mercedes-Benz Stadium	Recap
11	November 19	**Philadelphia Eagles**	**L** 9–37	5–5	AT&T Stadium	Recap
12	November 23	Los Angeles Chargers	**L** 6–28	5–6	AT&T Stadium	Recap
13	November 30	**Washington Redskins**	**W** 38–14	6–6	AT&T Stadium	Recap
14	December 10	at **New York Giants**	**W** 30–10	7–6	MetLife Stadium	Recap
15	December 17	at Oakland Raiders	**W** 20–17	8–6	Oakland–Alameda County Coliseum	Recap
16	December 24	Seattle Seahawks	**L** 12–21	8–7	AT&T Stadium	Recap
17	December 31	at **Philadelphia Eagles**	**W** 6–0	9–7	Lincoln Financial Field	Recap

Note: Intra-division opponents are in bold text.

=== Game summaries ===
==== Week 1: vs. New York Giants ====
Week One: New York Giants at Dallas Cowboys – Game summary

Quarter	1	2	3	4	Total
Giants	0	0	3	0	**3**
**Cowboys**	3	13	0	3	**19**

at AT&T Stadium, Arlington, Texas

- Date: September 10
- Game time: 7:30 p.m. CDT
- Game weather: Played indoors (retractable roof closed)
- Game attendance: 93,183
- Referee: Carl Cheffers
- TV announcers (NBC): Al Michaels, Cris Collinsworth and Michele Tafoya
- Recap, Gamebook

Game information

**First quarter**

- DAL – Dan Bailey 21-yard field goal, 6:25. Cowboys 3–0. **Drive: 9 plays, 51 yards, 2:58.**

**Second quarter**

- DAL – Dan Bailey 48-yard field goal, 12:45. Cowboys 6–0. **Drive: 14 plays, 41 yards, 7:38.**
- DAL – Jason Witten 12-yard pass from Dak Prescott (Dan Bailey kick), 1:41. Cowboys 13–0. **Drive: 6 plays, 65 yards, 2:07.**
- DAL – Dan Bailey 42-yard field goal, 0:05. Cowboys 16–0. **Drive: 7 plays, 51 yards, 1:14.**

**Third quarter**

- NYG – Aldrick Rosas 25-yard field goal, 5:16. Cowboys 16–3. **Drive: 16 plays, 68 yards, 9:44.**

**Fourth quarter**

- DAL – Dan Bailey 36-yard field goal, 1:55. Cowboys 19–3. **Drive: 11 plays, 34 yards, 5:53.**

**Top passers**

- NYG – Eli Manning – 29/38, 220 yards, INT
- DAL – Dak Prescott – 24/39, 268 yards, TD

**Top rushers**

- NYG – Paul Perkins – 7 rushes, 16 yards
- DAL – Ezekiel Elliott – 24 rushes, 104 yards

**Top receivers**

- NYG – Roger Lewis – 4 receptions, 54 yards
- DAL – Terrance Williams – 6 receptions, 68 yards

**Top tacklers**

- NYG –B. J. Goodson–18 tackles
- DAL –Sean Lee– 8 tackles

Dallas opened its third straight season at home against NFC East division rival New York. Giants wide receiver Odell Beckham Jr. sat out the game still nursing a preseason injury. Dallas' solid and workmanlike performance was punctuated early in the fourth quarter when Cole Beasley made a spectacular one-handed circus catch for a key first down. Dallas tight end Jason Witten surpassed Michael Irvin as the all-time receiving-yards leader in franchise history and also scored the lone touchdown of the game on a second-quarter 12-yard pass from quarterback Dak Prescott, who had some passes sail high early but settled down to turn in another solid and turnover-free performance. The Dallas win snapped its three-game losing streak against New York.

==== Week 2: at Denver Broncos ====
Week Two: Dallas Cowboys at Denver Broncos – Game summary

Quarter	1	2	3	4	Total
Cowboys	0	10	0	7	**17**
**Broncos**	7	14	14	7	**42**

at Sports Authority Field at Mile High, Denver, Colorado

- Date: September 17
- Game time: 3:25 p.m. CDT/2:25 p.m. MDT
- Game weather: 72 °F (22 °C), partly cloudy
- Game attendance: 76,919
- Referee: Brad Allen
- TV announcers (Fox): Joe Buck, Troy Aikman and Erin Andrews
- Recap, Gamebook

Game information

**First quarter**

- DEN – Emmanuel Sanders 10-yard pass from Trevor Siemian (Brandon McManus kick), 9:25. Broncos 7–0. **Drive: 8 plays, 78 yards, 3:45.**

**Second quarter**

- DAL – Dez Bryant 3-yard pass from Dak Prescott (Dan Bailey kick), 12:39. Tied 7–7. **Drive: 2 plays, 3 yards, 0:46.**
- DEN – C. J. Anderson 16-yard pass from Trevor Siemian (Brandon McManus kick), 5:54. Broncos 14–7. **Drive: 14 plays, 81 yards, 6:45.**
- DEN – Emmanuel Sanders 6-yard pass from Trevor Siemian (Brandon McManus kick), 1:38. Broncos 21–7. **Drive: 8 plays, 51 yards, 2:42.**
- DAL – Dan Bailey 56-yard field goal, 0:02. Broncos 21–10. **Drive: 8 plays, 37 yards, 1:36.**

**Third quarter**

- DEN – Virgil Green 2-yard pass from Trevor Siemian (Brandon McManus kick), 7:56. Broncos 28–10. **Drive: 15 plays, 75 yards, 7:04.**
- DEN – C. J. Anderson 23-yard run (Brandon McManus kick), 6:14. Broncos 35–10. **Drive: 2 plays, 23 yards, 0:14.**

**Fourth quarter**

- DAL – Jason Witten 28-yard pass from Dak Prescott (Dan Bailey kick), 14:24. Broncos 35–17. **Drive: 6 plays, 39 yards, 2:35.**
- DEN – Aqib Talib 103-yard interception return (Brandon McManus kick), 0:53. Broncos 42–17.

**Top passers**

- DAL – Dak Prescott – 30/50, 238 yards, 2 TD, 2 INT
- DEN – Trevor Siemian – 22/32, 231 yards, 4 TD, INT

**Top rushers**

- DAL – Dak Prescott – 3 rushes, 24 yards
- DEN – C. J. Anderson – 25 rushes, 118 yards, TD

**Top receivers**

- DAL – Jason Witten – 10 receptions, 97 yards, TD
- DEN – Demaryius Thomas – 6 receptions, 71 yards

**Top tacklers**

- DAL – Jaylon Smith, 10 tackles
- DEN – Brandon Marshall, 7 tackles

In a stunning reversal of the previous week's performance, the Dallas Cowboys struggled in almost every aspect of the game, getting blown out by an inspired Denver Broncos team in Denver. The Broncos defense stuffed the Dallas run game and pressured quarterback Dak Prescott, who threw two interceptions – one returned late in the game for a pick-six. Defensively Dallas had no answers for the Broncos attack, plagued with poor tackling and bad pursuit angles, giving up yards after pass catches and rushing yards in chunks. Dallas fell to 1–1, looking to be in total disarray – nursing several key injuries to its secondary – heading into its Monday night meeting at Arizona against the Cardinals.

==== Week 3: at Arizona Cardinals ====
Week Three: Dallas Cowboys at Arizona Cardinals – Game summary

Quarter	1	2	3	4	Total
**Cowboys**	0	7	7	14	**28**
Cardinals	7	0	7	3	**17**

at University of Phoenix Stadium, Glendale, Arizona

- Date: September 25
- Game time: 7:30 p.m. CDT/5:30 p.m. MST
- Game weather: Played indoors (retractable roof closed)
- Referee: Craig Wrolstad
- TV announcers (ESPN): Sean McDonough, Jon Gruden and Lisa Salters
- Recap, Gamebook

Game information

**First quarter**

- ARI – Jaron Brown 25-yard pass from Carson Palmer (Phil Dawson kick), 10:06. Cardinals 7–0. **Drive: 8 plays, 82 yards, 5:01.**

**Second quarter**

- DAL – Dak Prescott 10-yard run (Dan Bailey kick), 1:16. Tied 7–7. **Drive: 5 plays, 84 yards, 2:41.**

**Third quarter**

- DAL – Dez Bryant 15-yard pass from Dak Prescott (Dan Bailey kick), 8:42. Cowboys 14–7. **Drive: 4 plays, 46 yards, 1:58.**
- ARI – Larry Fitzgerald 15-yard pass from Carson Palmer (Phil Dawson kick), 3:21. Tied 14–14. **Drive: 3 plays, 54 yards, 1:32.**

**Fourth quarter**

- DAL – Brice Butler 37-yard pass from Dak Prescott (Dan Bailey kick), 12:03. Cowboys 21–14. **Drive: 5 plays, 50 yards, 2:53.**
- ARI – Phil Dawson 37-yard field goal, 6:40. Cowboys 21–17. **Drive: 16 plays, 56 yards, 5:17.**
- DAL – Ezekiel Elliott 8-yard run (Dan Bailey kick), 5:03. Cowboys 28–17. **Drive: 4 plays, 75 yards, 1:38.**

**Top passers**

- DAL – Dak Prescott – 13/18, 183 yards, 2 TD
- ARI – Carson Palmer – 29/48, 325 yards, 2 TD

**Top rushers**

- DAL – Ezekiel Elliott – 22 rushes, 80 yards, TD
- ARI – Andre Ellington – 5 rushes, 22 yards

**Top receivers**

- DAL – Brice Butler – 2 receptions, 90 yards, TD
- ARI – Larry Fitzgerald – 13 receptions, 149 yards, TD

**Top tacklers**

- DAL – Sean Lee – 8 tackles
- ARI – Tyvon Branch – 12 tackles

After a precarious start which saw Arizona take its opening possession straight down the field for a touchdown, and then Dallas following up with a prompt three-and-out, the Dallas Cowboys adjusted their defensive schemes and got their running game going and slowly but surely overcame the Cardinals on Monday Night Football.

Despite Carson Palmer's 325 yards passing, Dallas was able to limit scoring damage with key pressures and sacks, and run stoppages to keep the Cardinals neutralized. Dak Prescott turned in a turnover-free performance for the Cowboys with 183 yards passing and two touchdown tosses, while running for Dallas' first score – a second quarter 10-yard scamper on a read-option play. Ezekiel Elliott rebounded from last week's dismal performance to accumulate 80 yards on 22 carries and scored one touchdown. Dallas found itself with a 2–1 record heading into a short week to prepare for the visiting Los Angeles Rams October 1. As of 2026, this remains the last time the Cowboys defeated the Arizona Cardinals.

==== Week 4: vs. Los Angeles Rams ====
Week Four: Los Angeles Rams at Dallas Cowboys – Game summary

Quarter	1	2	3	4	Total
**Rams**	3	13	10	9	**35**
Cowboys	3	21	0	6	**30**

at AT&T Stadium, Arlington, Texas

- Date: October 1
- Game time: 12:00 p.m. CDT
- Game weather: Played indoors (retractable roof closed)
- Game attendance: 91,869
- Referee: Clete Blakeman
- TV announcers (Fox): Chris Myers, Daryl Johnston and Laura Okmin
- Recap, Gamebook

Game information

**First quarter**

- DAL – Dan Bailey 34-yard field goal, 11:30. Cowboys 3–0. **Drive: 7 plays, 64 yards, 3:30.**
- LAR – Greg Zuerlein 49-yard field goal, 7:07. Tied 3–3. **Drive: 9 plays, 53 yards, 4:23.**

**Second quarter**

- DAL – Ezekiel Elliott 10-yard pass from Dak Prescott (Dan Bailey kick), 14:05. Cowboys 10–3. **Drive: 15 plays, 81 yards, 8:02.**
- LAR – Greg Zuerlein 44-yard field goal, 12:39. Cowboys 10–6. **Drive: 5 plays, 9 yards, 1:26.**
- DAL – Ezekiel Elliott 1-yard run (Dan Bailey kick), 10:53. Cowboys 17–6. **Drive: 4 plays, 75 yards, 1:46.**
- LAR – Cooper Kupp 7-yard pass from Jared Goff (Greg Zuerlein kick), 6:33. Cowboys 17–13. **Drive: 5 plays, 18 yards, 1:56.**
- DAL – Brice Butler 10-yard pass from Dak Prescott (Dan Bailey kick), 1:51. Cowboys 24–13. **Drive: 9 plays, 75 yards, 4:42.**
- LAR – Greg Zuerlein 44-yard field goal, 0:00. Cowboys 24–16. **Drive: 8 plays, 49 yards, 1:51.**

**Third quarter**

- LAR – Greg Zuerlein 30-yard field goal, 7:26. Cowboys 24–19. **Drive: 8 plays 54 yards, 3:15.**
- LAR – Todd Gurley 53-yard pass from Jared Goff (Greg Zuerlein kick), 2:59. Rams 26–24. **Drive: 4 plays, 90 yards, 1:59.**

**Fourth quarter**

- LAR – Greg Zuerlein 28-yard field goal, 11:56. Rams 29–24. **Drive: 11 plays, 78 yards, 4:26.**
- LAR – Greg Zuerlein 43-yard field goal, 9:41. Rams 32–24. **Drive: 4 plays, 4 yards, 1:19.**
- DAL – James Hanna 28-yard pass from Dak Prescott (pass failed), 7:11. Rams 32–30. **Drive: 5 plays, 75 yards, 2:30.**
- LAR – Greg Zuerlein 33-yard field goal, 1:55. Rams 35–30. **Drive: 12 plays, 68 yards, 5:16.**

**Top passers**

- LAR – Jared Goff – 21/36, 255 yards, 2 TD,
- DAL – Dak Prescott – 20/36, 252 yards, 3 TD, INT

**Top rushers**

- LAR – Todd Gurley – 23 rushes, 121 yards
- DAL – Ezekiel Elliott – 21 rushes, 85 yards, TD

**Top receivers**

- LAR – Todd Gurley – 7 receptions, 94 yards, TD
- DAL – Dez Bryant – 5 receptions, 98 yards

**Top tacklers**

- LAR – Mark Barron – 8 tackles
- DAL – Jaylon Smith – 10 tackles

The "tale of two halves" sports cliché was never more true to life as it was Sunday October 1 in AT&T Stadium, as the Dallas Cowboys lost to the visiting Los Angeles Rams 35–30 after dominating the first half of play.

Dallas was in the driver's seat and looked ready to demolish the young Rams and their rookie head coach after a workmanlike, dominating first half that saw Dallas post three touchdowns after long-distance drives and hold a 24–16 halftime lead.

The second half saw Dallas' offense virtually grind to a halt while Los Angeles slowly chipped away at the lead, finally finding themselves ahead to stay after Todd Gurley's 53-yard catch-and-run put Los Angeles up 26–24 late in the third quarter. After Dallas posted a 4th-quarter touchdown on a pass to tight end James Hanna, Los Angeles was able to answer with its 7th field goal of the game. With the score 35–30, a late Dallas rally failed, and the Cowboys found themselves 2–2 with a looming meeting at home versus the Green Bay Packers October 8.

==== Week 5: vs. Green Bay Packers ====
Week Five: Green Bay Packers at Dallas Cowboys – Game summary

Quarter	1	2	3	4	Total
**Packers**	6	6	3	20	**35**
Cowboys	7	14	0	10	**31**

at AT&T Stadium, Arlington, Texas

- Date: October 8
- Game time: 3:25 p.m. CDT
- Game weather: Played indoors (retractable roof closed)
- Game attendance: 93,329
- Referee: Terry McAulay
- TV announcers (Fox): Joe Buck, Troy Aikman and Erin Andrews
- Recap, Gamebook

Game information

**First quarter**

- DAL – Cole Beasley 2-yard pass from Dak Prescott (Dan Bailey kick), 8:24. Cowboys 7–0. **Drive: 12 plays, 75 yards, 6:36.**
- GB – Davante Adams 10-yard pass from Aaron Rodgers (kick failed), 4:01. Cowboys 7–6. **Drive: 8 plays, 75 yards, 4:23.**

**Second quarter**

- DAL – Cole Beasley 5-yard pass from Dak Prescott (Dan Bailey), 13:37. Cowboys 14–6. **Drive: 11 plays, 75 yards, 5:24.**
- DAL – Dez Bryant 10-yard pass from Dak Prescott (Dan Bailey kick), 6:10. Cowboys 21–6. **Drive: 10 plays, 57 yards, 5:56.**
- GB – Aaron Jones (kick failed), 0:54. Cowboys 21–12. **Drive: 13 plays, 75 yards, 5:16.**

**Third quarter**

- GB – Mason Crosby 22-yard field goal, 11:09. Cowboys 21–15. **Drive: 9 plays, 71 yards, 3:51.**

**Fourth quarter**

- GB – Jordy Nelson 10-yard pass from Aaron Rodgers (Mason Crosby kick), 14:54. Packers 22–21. **Drive: 14 plays, 88 yards, 7:43.**
- DAL – Dan Bailey 43-yard field goal, 11:45. Cowboys 24–22. **Drive: 8 plays, 50 yards, 3:09.**
- GB – Damarious Randall 21-yard interception return (pass failed), 9:56. Packers 28–24. **Drive: 2 plays, 3 yards, 0:41.**
- DAL – Dak Prescott 11-yard run (Dan Bailey kick), 1:13. Cowboys 31–28. **Drive: 17 plays, 79 yards, 8:43.**
- GB – Davante Adams 12-yard pass from Aaron Rodgers (Mason Crosby kick), 0:11. Packers 35–31. **Drive: 9 plays, 75 yards, 1:02.**

**Top passers**

- GB – Aaron Rodgers – 19/29, 221 yards, 3 TD
- DAL – Dak Prescott – 25/36, 251 yards, 3 TD, INT

**Top rushers**

- GB – Aaron Jones – 19 rushes, 125 yards, TD
- DAL – Ezekiel Elliott – 29 rushes, 116 yards

**Top receivers**

- GB – Davante Adams – 7 receptions, 66 yards, 2 TD
- DAL – Jason Witten – 8 receptions, 61 yards

**Top tacklers**

- GB – Blake Martinez – 12 tackles
- DAL – Jourdan Lewis – 7 tackles

With Dallas posting a 21–12 halftime lead, they looked in prime form for revenge in this rematch of their Divisional round playoff the previous season. Green Bay kept chipping away and Aaron Rodgers led the Packers on a late nine-play 75-yard scoring drive that culminated in a 12-yard touchdown pass to Davante Adams with 11 seconds remaining in the game. Damarious Randall earlier added a pick-six to the scoring with a 21-yard return of a Dak Prescott interception to give Green Bay a 28–24 lead at 9:56 of the fourth quarter. Dallas had answered that, regaining the lead on an 11-yard Dak Prescott touchdown run after a grueling 17-play, eight-minute 79-yard scoring drive which left 1:13 on the game clock for Green Bay to work with. Dallas dropped to 2–3 with the loss, heading into its bye week, while Green Bay improved to 4–1 moving forward with a visit against division rival Minnesota Vikings October 15.

==== Week 7: at San Francisco 49ers ====
Week Seven: Dallas Cowboys at San Francisco 49ers – Game summary

Quarter	1	2	3	4	Total
**Cowboys**	14	6	13	7	**40**
49ers	3	0	0	7	**10**

at Levi's Stadium, Santa Clara, California

- Date: October 22
- Game time: 3:05 p.m. CDT/1:05 p.m. PDT
- Game weather: 68 °F (20 °C), sunny
- Game attendance: 70,133
- Referee: Ronald Torbert
- TV announcers (Fox): Thom Brennaman, Troy Aikman and Erin Andrews
- Recap, Gamebook

Game information

**First quarter**

- DAL – Ezekiel Elliott 1-yard run (Dan Bailey kick), 12:46. Cowboys 7–0. **Drive: 3 plays, 20 yards, 1:18.**
- DAL – Ezekiel Elliott 25-yard run (Dan Bailey kick), 7:57. Cowboys 14–0. **Drive: 7 plays, 74 yards, 3:28.**
- SF – Robbie Gould 42-yard field goal, 4:33. Cowboys 14–3. **Drive: 9 plays, 53 yards, 3:28.**

**Second quarter**

- DAL – Jason Witten 18-yard pass from Dak Prescott (pass failed), 10:33. Cowboys 20–3. **Drive: 12 plays, 86 yards, 5:03.**

**Third quarter**

- DAL – Ezekiel Elliott 72-yard pass from Dak Prescott (Jeff Heath kick), 11:12. Cowboys 27–3. **Drive: 1 play, 72 yards, 0:14.**
- DAL – Dak Prescott 2-yard run (kick failed), 0:46. Cowboys 33–3. **Drive: 13 plays, 80 yards, 7:44.**

**Fourth quarter**

- DAL – Dez Bryant 2-yard pass from Dak Prescott (Jeff Heath kick), 10:54. Cowboys 40–3. **Drive: 8 plays, 29 yards, 4:11.**
- SF – C. J. Beathard 4-yard run (Robbie Gould kick), 6:19. Cowboys 40–10. **Drive: 12 plays, 75 yards, 4:35.**

**Top passers**

- DAL – Dak Prescott – 16/25, 234 yards, 3 TD
- SF – C. J. Beathard – 22/38, 235 yards

**Top rushers**

- DAL – Ezekiel Elliott – 26 rushes, 147 yards, 2 TD
- SF – Carlos Hyde – 14 rushes, 68 yards

**Top receivers**

- DAL – Ezekiel Elliott – 1 reception, 72 yards, TD
- SF – Marquise Goodwin – 4 receptions, 80 yards

**Top tacklers**

- DAL – Anthony Hitchens – 8 tackles
- SF – Dontae Johnson – 6 tackles

Bouncing back from a two-game losing streak, Dallas dominated a winless San Francisco 49ers team 40–10. Ezekiel Elliott led the attack with 147 rushing yards and three touchdowns on 26 carries, with 219 total yards from scrimmage. Quarterback Dak Prescott completed 64 percent of his passes for 234 yards and three touchdowns with no interceptions and wasn't sacked, completing passes to eight different receivers and finishing with a 134.0 passer rating. The Dallas offense racked up 501 total yards with Dez Bryant posting 74 receiving yards on a game-leading 7 catches and scored one touchdown. The defense dominated throughout, with constant pressure on the quarterback including five sacks and aggressive pass coverage and run defense which held the 49ers to only 103 rushing yards. Dallas improved to 3–3 with the victory and a looming division match-up at Washington October 29.

==== Week 8: at Washington Redskins ====
Week Eight: Dallas Cowboys at Washington Redskins – Game summary

Quarter	1	2	3	4	Total
**Cowboys**	7	7	9	10	**33**
Redskins	10	3	0	6	**19**

at FedExField, Landover, Maryland

- Date: October 29
- Game time: 4:25 p.m. EDT/3:25 p.m. CDT
- Game weather: 60 °F (16 °C), rain
- Game attendance: 78,428
- Referee: Walt Anderson
- TV announcers (Fox): Thom Brennaman, Troy Aikman and Erin Andrews
- Recap, Gamebook

Game information

**First quarter**

- WAS – Nick Rose 38-yard field goal, 13:17. Redskins 3–0. **Drive: 4 plays, 9 yards, 1:39.**
- DAL – Ezekiel Elliott 13-yard run (Mike Nugent kick), 10:37. Cowboys 7–3. **Drive: 5 plays, 75 yards, 3:56.**
- WAS – Rob Kelley 1-yard run (Nick Rose kick), 6:39. Redskins 10–7. **Drive: 7 plays, 75 yards, 3:56.**

**Second quarter**

- WAS – Nick Rose 42-yard field goal, 10:09. Redskins 13–7. **Drive: 7 plays, 38 yards, 2:53.**
- DAL – Ezekiel Elliott 1-yard run (Mike Nugent kick), 2:24. Cowboys 14–13. **Drive: 2 plays, 2 yards, 0:39.**

**Third quarter**

- DAL – Mike Nugent 36-yard field goal, 8:44. Cowboys 17–13. **Drive 9 plays, 27 yards, 3:44.**
- DAL – Mike Nugent 48-yard field goal, 6:29. Cowboys 20–13. **Drive 4 plays, -4 yards, 2:08.**
- DAL – Mike Nugent 27-yard field goal, 0:42. Cowboys 23–13. **Drive 10 plays, 48 yards, 4:02.**

**Fourth quarter**

- DAL – Mike Nugent 37-yard field goal, 8:47. Cowboys 26–13. **Drive 9 plays, 44 yards, 4:53.**
- WAS – Josh Doctson 1-yard pass from Kirk Cousins (kick failed), 4:39. Cowboys 26–19. **Drive: 14 plays, 75 yards, 4:08.**
- DAL – Byron Jones 21-yard interception return (Mike Nugent kick), 0:30. Cowboys 33–19.

**Top passers**

- DAL – Dak Prescott – 14/22, 143 yards
- WAS – Kirk Cousins – 26/39, 263 yards, 1 TD, 1 INT

**Top rushers**

- DAL – Ezekiel Elliott – 33 rushes, 150 yards, 2 TD
- WAS – Rob Kelly – 8 rushes, 19 yards, TD

**Top receivers**

- DAL – Dez Bryant – 4 receptions, 39 yards
- WAS – Jamison Crowder – 9 receptions, 123 yards

**Top tacklers**

- DAL – Orlando Scandrick – 7 tackles
- WAS – Zach Brown – 8 tackles

On a windy, chilly, rainy Sunday afternoon at FedEx Field in Washington, Dallas earned its second consecutive road victory with a somewhat sloppy and penalty-ridden 33–19 result over NFC East rival Washington. Ezekiel Elliott carried the ball a career-high 31 times for 150 rushing yards and two touchdowns, to lead Dallas' 307 yards of total offense.

Dallas' defense limited the Redskins to only 49 yards rushing and 285 yards of total offense while recording 4 sacks for minus 27 yards, recovering two fumbles and grabbing one interception by cornerback Byron Jones – Dallas' first interception since week two versus Denver. On special teams, Dallas recovered a fumbled kickoff and Cowboys cornerback Orlando Scandrick returned a blocked field goal attempt 86 yards to the Washington 2-yard line, setting up an Ezekiel Elliott rushing touchdown, which put Dallas ahead 14–13 with 2:20 left to play in the first half.

Dallas improved its record to 4–3 and captured sole possession of second place in the NFC East, with a looming visit from the Kansas City Chiefs at AT&T Stadium November 5.

==== Week 9: vs. Kansas City Chiefs ====
Week Nine: Kansas City Chiefs at Dallas Cowboys – Game summary

Quarter	1	2	3	4	Total
Chiefs	0	10	7	0	**17**
**Cowboys**	7	7	7	7	**28**

at AT&T Stadium, Arlington, Texas

- Date: November 5
- Game time: 3:25 p.m. CST
- Game weather: Played indoors (retractable roof closed)
- Game attendance: 93,273
- Referee: Pete Morelli
- TV announcers (CBS): Jim Nantz, Tony Romo and Tracy Wolfson
- Recap, Gamebook

Game information

**First quarter**

- DAL – Cole Beasley 6-yard pass from Dak Prescott (Mike Nugent kick), 2:42. Cowboys 7–0. **Drive: 7 plays, 61 yards, 3:58.**

**Second quarter**

- KC – Harrison Butker 38-yard field goal, 7:24. Cowboys 7–3. **Drive: 9 plays, 44 yards, 5:08.**
- DAL – Dak Prescott 10-yard run (Mike Nugent kick), 0:21. Cowboys 14–3. **Drive: 7 plays, 82 yards, 1:31.**
- KC – Tyreek Hill 56-yard pass from Alex Smith (Harrison Butker kick), 0:02. Cowboys 14–10. **Drive: 2 plays, 63 yards, 0:13.**

**Third quarter**

- KC – Travis Kelce 2-yard pass from Alex Smith (Harrison Butker kick), 9:11. Chiefs 17–14. **Drive: 9 plays, 62 yards, 5:54.**
- DAL – Ezekiel Elliott 2-yard run (Mike Nugent kick), 3:33. Cowboys 21–17. **Drive: 12 plays, 75 yards, 5:37.**

**Fourth quarter**

- DAL – Cole Beasley 7-yard pass from Dak Prescott (Mike Nugent kick), 9:02. Cowboys 28–17. **Drive: 13 plays, 87 yards, 6:46.**

**Top passers**

- KC – Alex Smith – 25/34, 263 yards, 2 TD, INT
- DAL – Dak Prescott – 21/33, 249 yards, 2 TD

**Top rushers**

- KC – Kareem Hunt – 9 rushes, 37 yards
- DAL – Ezekiel Elliott – 27 rushes, 93 yards, TD

**Top receivers**

- KC – Travis Kelce – 7 receptions, 73 yards, TD
- DAL – Terrance Williams – 9 receptions, 141 yards

**Top tacklers**

- KC –
- DAL –

With Ezekiel Elliott playing on a last-minute stay of his looming suspension and carrying the ball 27 times for 93 yards and one touchdown, and Dak Prescott throwing two touchdown passes to Cole Beasley, running for another score and finding receiver Terrance Williams nine times for a game high 141 yards, the Cowboys notched their third straight victory by a score of 28–17 and improved their record to 5–3 at AT&T Stadium against the AFC West division leading Kansas City Chiefs.

Two long touchdown drives in the second half lifted Dallas to the win after Kansas City had taken command on an unexpected 56-yard Tyreek Hill touchdown catch and run with no time left on the 2nd quarter game clock, then Kansas City following that up with a Travis Kelce 2-yard touchdown grab from Alex Smith at 9:11 of the third quarter to take its first lead of the game, 17–14. Dallas' two long touchdown drives were 12 and 13 plays respectively, eating up over 12 minutes of second-half game clock.

This was also Tony Romo's first return to AT&T Stadium, this time, as an announcer. Romo played for the Dallas Cowboys from 2003 to 2016.

==== Week 10: at Atlanta Falcons ====
Week Ten: Dallas Cowboys at Atlanta Falcons – Game summary

Quarter	1	2	3	4	Total
Cowboys	7	0	0	0	**7**
**Falcons**	3	7	7	10	**27**

at Mercedes-Benz Stadium, Atlanta, Georgia

- Date: November 12
- Game time: 4:25 p.m. EST/3:25 p.m. CST
- Game weather: Played indoors (retractable roof closed)
- Game attendance: 73,761
- Referee: Ed Hochuli
- TV announcers (Fox): Joe Buck, Troy Aikman and Erin Andrews
- Recap, Gamebook

Game information

**First quarter**

- DAL – Dak Prescott 11-yard run (Mike Nugent kick), 6:19. Cowboys 7–0. **Drive: 4 plays, 21 yards, 1:30.**
- ATL – Matt Bryant 50-yard field goal, 0:00. Cowboys 7–3. **Drive: 11 plays, 45 yards, 6:19.**

**Second quarter**

- ATL – Tevin Coleman 1-yard run (Matt Bryant kick), 1:31. Falcons 10–7. **Drive: 9 plays, 80 yards, 3:25.**

**Third quarter**

- ATL – Justin Hardy 3-yard pass from Matt Ryan (Matt Bryant kick), 8:26. Falcons 17–7. **Drive: 11 plays, 75 yards, 6:34.**

**Fourth quarter**

- ATL – Austin Hooper 1-yard pass from Matt Ryan (Matt Bryant kick), 13:48. Falcons 24–7. **Drive: 7 plays, 72 yards, 3:41.**
- ATL – Matt Bryant 29-yard field goal, 8:28. Falcons 27–7. **Drive: 8 plays, 46 yards, 3:55.**

**Top passers**

- DAL – Dak Prescott – 20/30, 176 yards
- ATL – Matt Ryan – 22/29, 215 yards, 2 TD, INT

**Top rushers**

- DAL – Alfred Morris – 11 carries, 53 yards
- ATL – Tevin Coleman – 20 carries, 83 yards, TD

**Top receivers**

- DAL – Jason Witten – 7 receptions, 59 yards
- ATL – Julio Jones – 6 receptions, 57 yards

**Top tacklers**

- DAL –
- ATL –

Already without Ezekiel Elliott, whose suspension had finally taken effect, the Cowboys lost key players Tyron Smith and Sean Lee to injuries. Dak Prescott had a miserable day, being sacked an astounding eight times. Six of those sacks came from an unknown Adrian Clayborn, who set the Falcons record for most sacks in one game. The Cowboys lost the game 27–7, dropping to 5–4.

==== Week 11: vs. Philadelphia Eagles ====
Week Eleven: Philadelphia Eagles at Dallas Cowboys – Game summary

Quarter	1	2	3	4	Total
**Eagles**	7	0	16	14	**37**
Cowboys	6	3	0	0	**9**

at AT&T Stadium, Arlington, Texas

- Date: November 19
- Game time: 7:30 p.m. CST
- Game weather: 54 °F (12 °C), clear skies — retractable roof open
- Game attendance: 93,247
- Referee: Bill Vinovich
- TV announcers (NBC): Al Michaels, Cris Collinsworth and Michele Tafoya
- Recap, Gamebook

Game information

**First quarter**

- DAL – Mike Nugent 48-yard field goal, 13:27. Cowboys 3–0. **Drive: 4 plays, 7 yards, 1:38.**
- PHI – Kenjon Barner 4-yard run (Jake Elliott kick), 9:16. Eagles 7–3. **Drive: 8 plays, 75 yards, 4:19.**
- DAL – Mike Nugent 27-yard field goal, 3:20. Eagles 7–6. **Drive: 11 plays, 65 yards, 5:47.**

**Second quarter**

- DAL – Mike Nugent 47-yard field goal, 1:00. Cowboys 9–7. **Drive: 15 plays, 59 yards, 7:19.**

**Third quarter**

- PHI – Corey Clement 11-yard run (Corey Clement run), 10:56. Eagles 15–9. **Drive: 8 plays, 75 yards, 4:04.**
- PHI – Torrey Smith 11-yard pass from Carson Wentz (Alshon Jeffery pass from Carson Wentz), 5:40. Eagles 23–9. **Drive: 5 plays, 90 yards, 2:28.**

**Fourth quarter**

- PHI – Alshon Jeffrey 17-yard pass from Carson Wentz (pass failed), 12:10. Eagles 29–9. **Drive: 11 plays, 85 yards, 5:48.**
- PHI – Nigel Bradham 37-yard fumble return (Trey Burton pass from Carson Wentz), 10:43. Eagles 37–9. **Drive: 3 plays, -3 yards, 1:19.**

**Top passers**

- PHI – Carson Wentz – 14/27, 168 yards, 2 TD
- DAL – Dak Prescott – 18/31, 145 yards, 3 INT

**Top rushers**

- PHI – Jay Ajayi – 7 carries, 91 yards
- DAL – Alfred Morris – 17 carries, 91 yards

**Top receivers**

- PHI – Alshon Jeffrey – 3 receptions, 50 yards, TD
- DAL – Dez Bryant – 8 receptions, 63 yards

The game immediately began with Ryan Switzer running a kickoff for 61 yards to Eagles' territory. The Cowboys would open the scoring with a field goal from Mike Nugent, who was filling in for injured Dan Bailey. The Cowboys closed the half leading 9–7. Afterwards, the Cowboys would allow 30 unanswered points to make the game 37–9. Dak Prescott was harassed all game by the Eagles' defense, losing a fumble and getting intercepted three times. This loss dropped them to 5–5 on the season and 0–2 without Elliott. The 28-point loss margin was the worst Cowboys loss at AT&T Stadium at the time; it would be surpassed seven years later when the Cowboys lost 47–9 to the Detroit Lions.

==== Week 12: vs. Los Angeles Chargers ====
NFL on Thanksgiving Day

Week Twelve: Los Angeles Chargers at Dallas Cowboys – Game summary

Quarter	1	2	3	4	Total
**Chargers**	0	3	13	12	**28**
Cowboys	0	0	0	6	**6**

at AT&T Stadium, Arlington, Texas

- Date: November 23
- Game time: 3:30 p.m. CST
- Game weather: Played indoors (retractable roof closed)
- Game attendance: 93,012
- Referee: Jerome Boger
- TV announcers (CBS): Jim Nantz, Tony Romo and Tracy Wolfson
- Recap, Gamebook

Game information

**First quarter**

- No scoring plays.

**Second quarter**

- LAC – Nick Novak 22-yard field goal, 1:56. Chargers 3–0. **Drive: 14 plays, 66 yards, 6:59.**

**Third quarter**

- LAC – Hunter Henry 3-yard pass from Philip Rivers (kick failed), 8:59. Chargers 9–0. **Drive: 10 plays, 77 yards, 6:01.**
- LAC – Tyrell Williams 27-yard pass from Philip Rivers (Drew Kaser kick), 1:46. Chargers 16–0. **Drive: 8 plays, 92 yards, 3:59.**

**Fourth quarter**

- DAL – Rod Smith 2-yard run (pass failed), 12:48. Chargers 16–6. **Drive: 9 plays, 81 yards, 3:58.**
- LAC – Keenan Allen 42-yard pass from Philip Rivers (kick failed), 9:58. Chargers 22–6. **Drive: 6 plays, 75 yards, 2:50.**
- LAC – Desmond King 90-yard interception return (kick failed), 7:41. Chargers 28–6.

**Top passers**

- LAC – Philip Rivers – 27/33, 434 yards, 3 TD
- DAL – Dak Prescott – 20/27, 179 yards, 2 INT

**Top rushers**

- LAC – Melvin Gordon – 21 carries, 65 yards
- DAL – Rod Smith – 9 carries, 41 yards, TD

**Top receivers**

- LAC – Keenan Allen – 11 receptions, 172 yards, TD
- DAL – Jason Witten – 7 receptions, 44 yards

**Top tacklers**

- LAC –
- DAL –

==== Week 13: vs. Washington Redskins ====
Week Thirteen: Washington Redskins at Dallas Cowboys – Game summary

Quarter	1	2	3	4	Total
Redskins	0	7	0	7	**14**
**Cowboys**	0	17	0	21	**38**

at AT&T Stadium, Arlington, Texas

- Date: November 30
- Game time: 7:25 p.m. CST
- Game weather: 58 °F (14 °C), clear — retractable roof open
- Game attendance: 91,712
- Referee: Craig Wrolstad
- TV announcers (NBC/NFLN/Amazon Video): Mike Tirico, Cris Collinsworth and Heather Cox
- Recap, Gamebook

Game information

**First quarter**

- No scoring plays.

**Second quarter**

- DAL – Jason Witten 8-yard pass from Dak Prescott (Dan Bailey kick), 10:43. Cowboys 7–0. **Drive: 11 plays, 59 yards, 6:09.**
- DAL – Dan Bailey 24-yard field goal, 5:29. Cowboys 10–0. **Drive: 7 plays, 13 yards, 4:14.**
- DAL – Ryan Switzer 83-yard punt return (Dan Bailey kick), 3:46. Cowboys 17–0.
- WAS – Ryan Grant 20-yard pass from Kirk Cousins (Nick Rose kick), 0:59. Cowboys 17–7. **Drive: 9 plays, 87 yards, 3:25.**

**Third quarter**

- No scoring plays.

**Fourth quarter**

- DAL – Dez Bryant 13-yard pass from Dak Prescott (Dan Bailey kick), 14:53. Cowboys 24–7. **Drive: 11 plays, 84 yards, 5:28.**
- WAS – Josh Doctson 14-yard pass from Kirk Cousins (Nick Rose kick), 11:28. Cowboys 24–14. **Drive: 9 plays, 87 yards, 3:25.**
- DAL – Alfred Morris 1-yard run (Dan Bailey kick), 4:55. Cowboys 31–14. **Drive: 10 plays, 75 yards, 6:33.**
- DAL – Rod Smith 1-yard run (Dan Bailey kick), 2:37. Cowboys 38–14. **Drive: 4 plays, 11 yards, 1:39.**

**Top passers**

- WAS – Kirk Cousins – 26/37, 251 yards, 2 TD, 2 INT
- DAL – Dak Prescott – 11/22, 102 yards, 2 TD

**Top rushers**

- WAS – Samaje Perine – 12 carries, 38 yards
- DAL – Alfred Morris – 27 carries, 127 yards, TD

**Top receivers**

- WAS – Ryan Grant – 5 receptions, 76 yards, TD
- DAL – Dez Bryant – 5 receptions, 61 yards, TD

**Top tacklers**

- WAS –
- DAL –

==== Week 14: at New York Giants ====
Week Fourteen: Dallas Cowboys at New York Giants – Game summary

Quarter	1	2	3	4	Total
**Cowboys**	3	7	0	20	**30**
Giants	0	10	0	0	**10**

at MetLife Stadium, East Rutherford, New Jersey

- Date: December 10
- Game time: 1:00 p.m. EST/12:00 p.m. CST
- Game weather: 39 °F (4 °C), fair
- Game attendance: 78,125
- Referee: Walt Anderson
- TV announcers (Fox): Kevin Burkhardt, Charles Davis and Pam Oliver
- Recap, Gamebook

Game information

**First quarter**

- DAL – Dan Bailey 21-yard field goal, 7:14. Cowboys 3–0. **Drive: 16 plays, 73 yards, 7:46.**

**Second quarter**

- NYG – Aldrick Rosas 39-yard field goal, 12:50. Tied 3–3. **Drive: 17 plays, 62 yards, 9:24.**
- NYG – Rhett Ellison 1-yard pass from Eli Manning (Aldrick Rosas kick), 2:07. Giants 10–3. **Drive: 8 plays, 68 yards, 4:17.**
- DAL – Dez Bryant 50-yard pass from Dak Prescott (Dan Bailey kick), 1:38. Tied 10–10. **Drive: 4 plays, 75 yards, 0:29.**

**Third quarter**

- No scoring plays.

**Fourth quarter**

- DAL – Jason Witten 20-yard pass from Dak Prescott (Dan Bailey kick), 7:38. Cowboys 17–10. **Drive: 4 plays, 82 yards, 1:51.**
- DAL – Rod Smith 81-yard pass from Dak Prescott (kick failed), 4:08. Cowboys 23–10. **Drive: 3 plays, 88 yards, 0:25.**
- DAL – Rod Smith 15-yard run (Dan Bailey kick), 2:57. Cowboys 30–10. **Drive: 3 plays, 21 yards, 0:19.**

**Top passers**

- DAL – Dak Prescott – 20/30, 332 yards, 3 TD
- NYG – Eli Manning – 31/46, 228 yards, 1 TD, 2 INT

**Top rushers**

- DAL – Alfred Morris – 19 carries, 62 yards
- NYG – Wayne Gallman – 12 carries, 59 yards

**Top receivers**

- DAL – Rod Smith – 5 receptions, 113 yards, 1 TD
- NYG – Evan Engram – 4 receptions, 54 yards

For the first time in franchise history, the Cowboys wore white pants and navy jerseys. The jerseys are usually paired with silver pants. The white pants were the Color Rush pants with a navy/silver/navy stripe down the side, and the navy jersey is the regular alternate navy jersey, usually worn on Thanksgiving.

==== Week 15: at Oakland Raiders ====
Week Fifteen: Dallas Cowboys at Oakland Raiders – Game summary

Quarter	1	2	3	4	Total
**Cowboys**	3	7	7	3	**20**
Raiders	0	0	10	7	**17**

at Oakland Alameda Coliseum, Oakland, California

- Date: December 17
- Game time: 7:30 p.m. CST/5:30 p.m. PST
- Game weather: 57 °F (14 °C), clear
- Game attendance: 55,372
- Referee: Gene Steratore
- TV announcers (NBC): Al Michaels, Cris Collinsworth and Michele Tafoya
- Recap, Gamebook

Game information

**First quarter**

- DAL – Dan Bailey 45-yard field goal, 4:56. Cowboys 3–0. **Drive: 9 plays, 41 yards, 4:08.**

**Second quarter**

- DAL – Rod Smith 1-yard run (Dan Bailey kick), 14:04. Cowboys 10–0. **Drive: 8 plyas, 65 yards, 4:45.**

**Third quarter**

- OAK – Michael Crabtree 2-yard pass from Derek Carr (Giorgio Tavecchio kick), 8:03. Cowboys 10–7. **Drive: 11 plays, 90 yards. 6:57.**
- OAK – Giorgio Tavecchio 39-yard field goal, 6:14. Tie 10–10. **Drive: 4 plays, 1 yard, 1:00.**
- DAL – Dak Prescott 5-yard run (Dan Bailey kick), 0:45. Cowboys 17–10. **Drive 11 plays, 75 yards, 5:29.**

**Fourth quarter**

- OAK – Michael Crabtree 2-yard pass from Derek Carr (Giorgio Tavecchio kick), 10:35. Tie 17–17. **Drive: 10 plays, 53 yards, 5:10.**
- DAL – Dan Bailey 19-yard field goal, 1:44. Cowboys 20–17. **Drive: 11 plays 69 yards, 4:46.**

**Top passers**

- DAL – Dak Prescott 18/27, 212 yards, 2 INT
- OAK – Derek Carr 21/38, 171 yards, 2 TD

**Top rushers**

- DAL – Alfred Morris 16 rushes, 61 yards
- OAK – Marshawn Lynch 16 rushes 76 yards

**Top receivers**

- DAL – Dez Bryant 2 receptions, 59 yards
- OAK – Seth Roberts 3 receptions, 52 yards

**Top tacklers**

- DAL – Sean Lee 10 tackles
- OAK – NaVorro Bowman 9 tackles

==== Week 16: vs. Seattle Seahawks ====
Week Sixteen: Seattle Seahawks at Dallas Cowboys – Game summary

Quarter	1	2	3	4	Total
**Seahawks**	0	7	7	7	**21**
Cowboys	0	9	3	0	**12**

at AT&T Stadium, Arlington, Texas

- Date: December 24
- Game time: 3:25 p.m. CST
- Game weather: Played indoors (retractable roof closed)
- Game attendance: 92,150
- Referee: John Hussey
- TV announcers (Fox): Joe Buck, Troy Aikman and Erin Andrews
- Recap, Gamebook

Game information

**First quarter**

- No scoring plays.

**Second quarter**

- DAL – Dan Bailey 34-yard field goal, 14:11. Cowboys 3–0. **Drive: 11 plays, 42 yards, 5:50.**
- DAL – Dan Bailey 51-yard field goal, 5:48. Cowboys 6–0. **Drive: 8 plays, 30 yards, 5:24.**
- SEA – Jimmy Graham 3-yard pass from Russell Wilson (Blair Walsh kick), 1:38. Seahawks 7–6. **Drive: 5 plays, 43 yards, 2:24.**
- DAL – Dan Bailey 51-yard field goal, 0:03. Cowboys 9–7. **Drive: 8 plays, 49 yards, 1:35.**

**Third quarter**

- SEA – Justin Coleman 30-yard interception return (Blair Walsh kick), 11:19. Seahawks 14–9.
- DAL – Dan Bailey 39-yard field goal, 8:36. Seahawks 14–12. **Drive: 5 plays, 44 yards, 2:43.**

**Fourth quarter**

- SEA – Doug Baldwin 6-yard pass from Russell Wilson (Blair Walsh kick), 11:59. Seahawks 21–12. **Drive: 13 plays, 79 yards, 6:25.**

**Top passers**

- SEA – Russell Wilson – 14/21, 93 yards, 2 TD
- DAL – Dak Prescott – 21/34, 182 yards, 2 INT

**Top rushers**

- SEA – Russell Wilson – 9 carries, 29 yards
- DAL – Ezekiel Elliott – 24 carries, 97 yards

**Top receivers**

- SEA – Doug Baldwin – 4 receptions, 35 yards, TD
- DAL – Dez Bryant – 3 receptions, 44 yards

**Top tacklers**

- SEA –
- DAL –

Elliott returned from his six-game suspension and rushed for 97 yards in his first game back. However, the Cowboys could not find the end zone all game, and were doomed by a costly third-quarter pick six by Justin Coleman that ended up being the decisive score. Dallas dropped to 8–7 on the year and was eliminated from playoff contention with the 21–12 loss.

==== Week 17: at Philadelphia Eagles ====
Week Seventeen: Dallas Cowboys at Philadelphia Eagles – Game summary

Quarter	1	2	3	4	Total
**Cowboys**	0	0	0	6	**6**
Eagles	0	0	0	0	**0**

at Lincoln Financial Field, Philadelphia, Pennsylvania

- Date: December 31
- Game time: 1:00 p.m. EST/12:00 p.m. CST
- Game weather: 19 °F (−7 °C), sunny
- Game attendance: 69,596
- Referee: John Parry
- TV announcers (Fox): Kenny Albert, Ronde Barber and Kristina Pink
- Recap, Gamebook

Game information

**First quarter**

- No Scoring plays.

**Second quarter**

- No Scoring plays.

**Third quarter**

- No Scoring plays.

**Fourth quarter**

- DAL – Brice Butler 20-yard pass from Dak Prescott (kick failed), 12:19. Cowboys 6–0. **Drive: 12 plays, 103 yards, 5:48.**

**Top passers**

- DAL – Dak Prescott: 17/30, 179 yards, TD
- PHI – Nate Sudfeld: 19/23, 134 yards

**Top rushers**

- DAL – Ezekiel Elliott: 27 rushes, 103 yards
- PHI – LeGarrette Blount: 9 rushes, 37 yards

**Top receivers**

- DAL – Brice Butler: 2 receptions, 50 yards, TD
- PHI – Mack Hollins: 3 receptions, 25 yards

**Top tacklers**

- DAL – Sean Lee: 7 tackles, 1 assist
- PHI – Jaylen Watkins: 7 tackles

In a tight, defensive game against the Eagles backups, the Cowboys narrowly prevailed 6-0, with the only score coming on a fourth-quarter touchdown by Brice Butler. With the close win, the Cowboys finished a difficult season with a 9–7 record. Despite this, it was the first time they had recorded back-to-back winning seasons since the 2008 and 2009 seasons. They also recorded their first shutout since the 2009 season which was, coincidentally, also during a Week 17 game against the Eagles. This was Dez Bryant's last game with Dallas, as the Cowboys released him on April 13, 2018. This was Jason Witten's last game in the NFL until Week 1 of the 2019 season, as he retired on May 3, 2018 and joined the Monday Night Football booth. He later came out of retirement and rejoined the Cowboys in 2019. It would also be the final game in a Cowboys uniform for kicker Dan Bailey, who missed the extra point on Butler's touchdown, as well as a late field goal attempt. Bailey was released on September 1, 2018 and signed with the Minnesota Vikings on September 17, 2018.

=== Standings ===
==== Division ====
NFC East
	W	L	T	PCT	DIV	CONF	PF	PA	STK
^{(1)} Philadelphia Eagles	13	3	0	.813	5–1	10–2	457	295	L1
Dallas Cowboys	9	7	0	.563	5–1	7–5	354	332	W1
Washington Redskins	7	9	0	.438	1–5	5–7	342	388	L1
New York Giants	3	13	0	.188	1–5	1–11	246	388	W1

==== Conference ====
NFC
#	Team	Division	W	L	T	PCT	DIV	CONF	SOS	SOV	STK
**Division leaders**
1 (Note: Philadelphia claimed the No. 1 seed over Minnesota based on winning percentage vs. common opponents. Philadelphia's cumulative record against Carolina, Chicago, the Los Angeles Rams and Washington was 5–0, compared to Minnesota's 4–1 cumulative record against the same four teams.)	Philadelphia Eagles	East	13	3	0	.813	5–1	10–2	.461	.433	L1
2	Minnesota Vikings	North	13	3	0	.813	5–1	10–2	.492	.447	W3
3 (Note: LA Rams claimed the No. 3 seed over New Orleans based on head-to-head victory.)	Los Angeles Rams	West	11	5	0	.688	4–2	7–5	.504	.460	L1
4 (Note: New Orleans clinched the NFC South division over Carolina based on head-to-head sweep.)	New Orleans Saints	South	11	5	0	.688	4–2	8–4	.535	.483	L1
**Wild Cards**
5	Carolina Panthers	South	11	5	0	.688	3–3	7–5	.539	.500	L1
6	Atlanta Falcons	South	10	6	0	.625	4–2	9–3	.543	.475	W1
**Did not qualify for the postseason**
7 (Note: Detroit finished ahead of Dallas and Seattle based on conference record, while Seattle finished ahead of Dallas based on head-to-head victory.)	Detroit Lions	North	9	7	0	.563	5–1	8–4	.496	.368	W1
8	Seattle Seahawks	West	9	7	0	.563	4–2	7–5	.492	.444	L1
9	Dallas Cowboys	East	9	7	0	.563	5–1	7–5	.496	.438	W1
10	Arizona Cardinals	West	8	8	0	.500	3–3	5–7	.488	.406	W2
11 (Note: Green Bay finished ahead of Washington based on record vs. common opponents. Green Bay's cumulative record against Dallas, Minnesota, New Orleans and Seattle was 2–3, compared to Washington's 1–4 cumulative record against the same four teams.)	Green Bay Packers	North	7	9	0	.438	2–4	5–7	.539	.357	L3
12	Washington Redskins	East	7	9	0	.438	1–5	5–7	.539	.429	L1
13	San Francisco 49ers	West	6	10	0	.375	1–5	3–9	.512	.438	W5
14 (Note: Tampa Bay finished ahead of Chicago based on head-to-head victory.)	Tampa Bay Buccaneers	South	5	11	0	.313	1–5	3–9	.555	.375	W1
15	Chicago Bears	North	5	11	0	.313	0–6	1–11	.559	.500	L1
16	New York Giants	East	3	13	0	.188	1–5	1–11	.531	.458	W1
**Tiebreakers** (Note: When breaking ties for three or more teams under the NFL's rules, they are first broken within divisions, then comparing only the highest-ranked remaining team from each division.)
