= Duke Thomas =

Duke Thomas may refer to:

- Duke Thomas (character)
- Duke Thomas (American football) (born 1994)
