= Benson Mayowa =

American football player (born 1991)

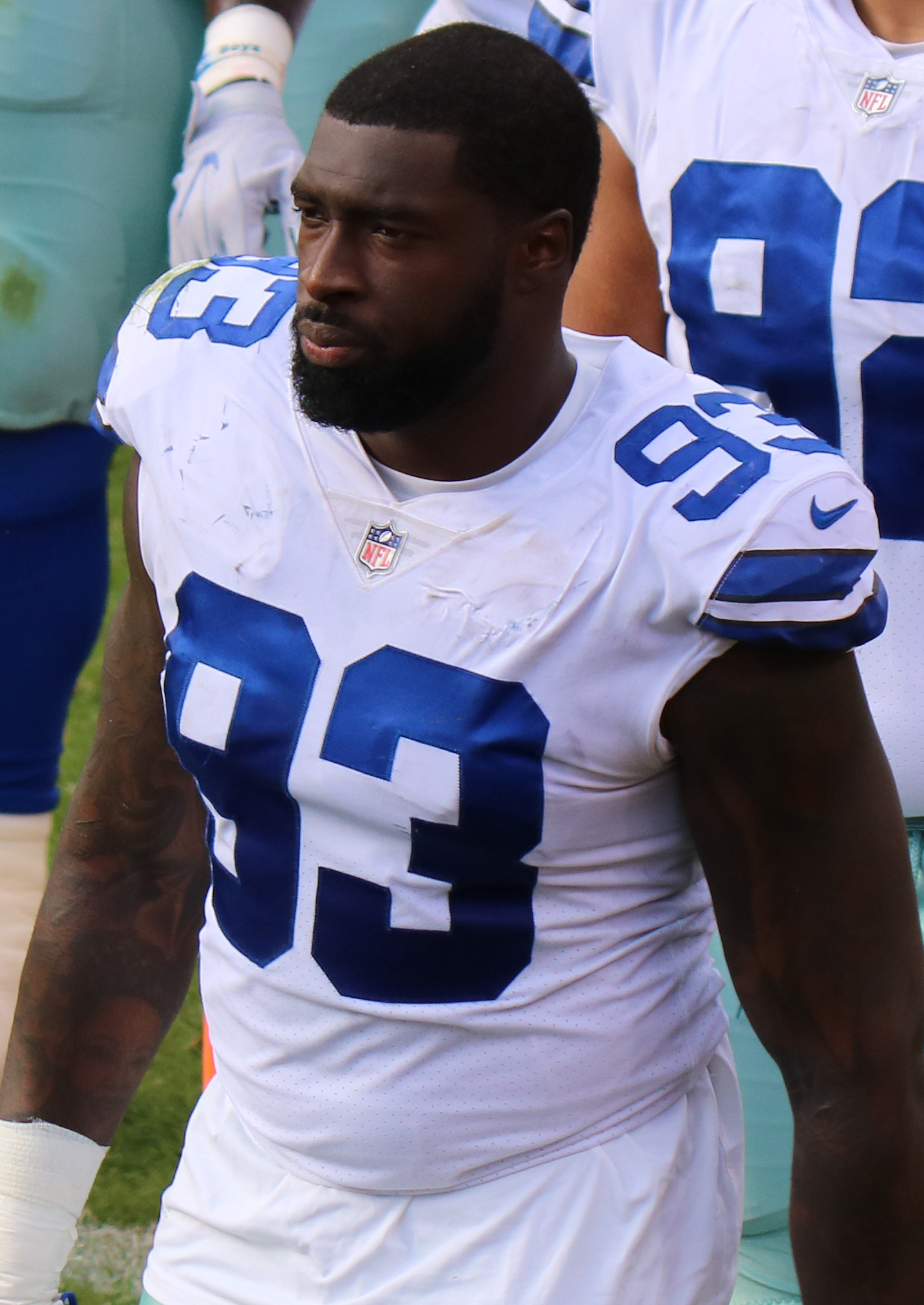
- Mayowa with the Dallas Cowboys in 2017

No. 95, 93, 91, 10
- Position: Defensive end

Personal information
- Born: August 3, 1991 (age 35); Inglewood, California, U.S.
- Listed height: 6 ft 3 in (1.91 m)
- Listed weight: 252 lb (114 kg)

Career information
- High school: Inglewood
- College: Idaho
- NFL draft: 2013: undrafted

Career history
- Seattle Seahawks (2013); Oakland Raiders (2014–2015); Dallas Cowboys (2016–2017); Arizona Cardinals (2018); Oakland Raiders (2019); Seattle Seahawks (2020–2021)

Awards and highlights
- Super Bowl champion (XLVIII)

Career NFL statistics
- Total tackles: 185
- Sacks: 27.0
- Forced fumbles: 8
- Fumble recoveries: 5
- Pass deflections: 8
- Stats at Pro Football Reference

Benson Babatunde Mayowa (born August 3, 1991) is an American former professional football player who was a defensive end in the National Football League (NFL). He played college football for the Idaho Vandals. Mayowa played in the NFL for the Dallas Cowboys, Arizona Cardinals, Oakland Raiders, and Seattle Seahawks.

== Early life and college ==
Mayowa attended Inglewood High School, where as a senior defensive end, he had 75 tackles, 11 sacks, and one interception, while receiving All-league and second-team all-California Interscholastic Federation honors.

After not being heavily recruited because of his academic grades, he accepted a football scholarship from the University of Idaho. He was a backup defensive end as a true freshman, registering 6 tackles (2 for loss), one sack and one quarterback hurry. The next year he made 25 tackles (4.5 for loss), 3 sacks, one quarterback hurry, 2 passes defended, 3 forced fumbles and one recovered.

As a junior, he started 6 out of 10 games (missed 2 with an injury), posting 17 tackles (4.5 for loss), 3 sacks, 5 quarterback hurries, 2 passes defended, 2 forced fumbles and one recovered.

As a senior, he started 8 out of 11 games, making 22 tackles (7 for loss), 3 sacks, 4 quarterback hurries, one pass defended and 3 forced fumbles. He finished his college career with 45 games, 67 tackles (47 solo), 11 sacks, 11 forced fumbles, and 3 fumble recoveries.

== Professional career ==
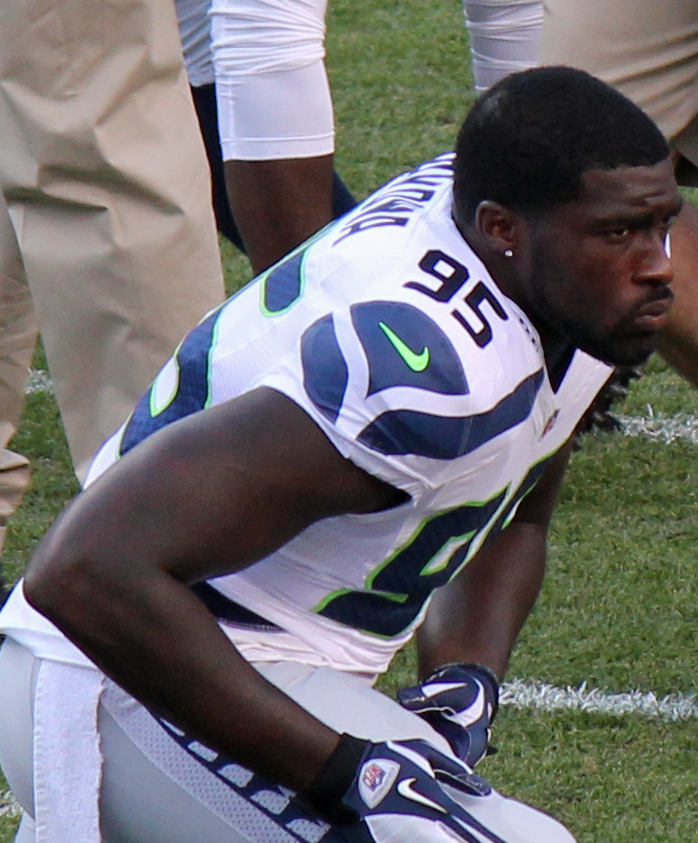
Mayowa with the Seahawks in 2014

=== Seattle Seahawks (first stint) ===
On May 13, 2013, he was signed by the Seattle Seahawks as an undrafted free agent, after participating on a tryout basis at their rookie minicamp. He played in the first two regular season games and was declared inactive for the rest of the season, as the Seahawks rotated their multiple defensive ends.

On August 30, 2014, he was waived by Seattle during their final roster cuts.

=== Oakland Raiders (first stint) ===
On August 31, 2014, Mayowa was claimed off waivers by the Oakland Raiders. On December 7, he recorded his first NFL career sack on quarterback Colin Kaepernick in a win against the San Francisco 49ers. He finished the season playing in all 16 regular-season games, while starting in 1, with 14 tackles and one sack.

In 2015, he made 16 tackles, with one sack on Detroit Lions quarterback Matthew Stafford in a Week 11 loss, as well as one forced fumble and 2 fumble recoveries. He played in 12 games, starting in 2.

=== Dallas Cowboys ===
On March 18, 2016, the Dallas Cowboys signed Mayowa to a three-year, $8.25 million offer sheet. On March 22, the Raiders declined to match the offer, officially allowing him to sign with the Cowboys without receiving any compensation.

Dallas looked towards Mayowa to provide depth at the defensive end position, with the looming suspensions to DeMarcus Lawrence and Randy Gregory, coupled with their decision not to bring back Greg Hardy.

He was placed on physically unable to perform list at the start of training camp, while recovering from a knee scope he underwent in June. He began the season as the starter at right defensive end, until losing his position after Lawrence returned from his four-game suspension. His role began to be reduced and against the Cincinnati Bengals, he played less snaps than Ryan Davis. He was declared inactive against the Pittsburgh Steelers, after being passed on the depth chart by Davis, because he was not providing the pass rush pressure that was expected from him. He was declared inactive against the Baltimore Ravens and Washington Redskins. He returned to the lineup against the Minnesota Vikings, experiencing an improvement in his play, while finishing with 6 sacks (led the team), making 4 of them in the last five games.

In 2017, he was limited at the start of training camp with knee soreness. Even though David Irving, Randy Gregory and Damontre Moore where suspended at the beginning of the regular season, Mayowa could not pass Tyrone Crawford on the depth chart at right defensive end. He suffered a back injury against the Oakland Raiders and missed the last 2 games. He finished with 21 tackles, one sack, 2 starts and was declared inactive in 2 games.

On March 7, 2018, Mayowa was released by the Cowboys.

=== Arizona Cardinals ===
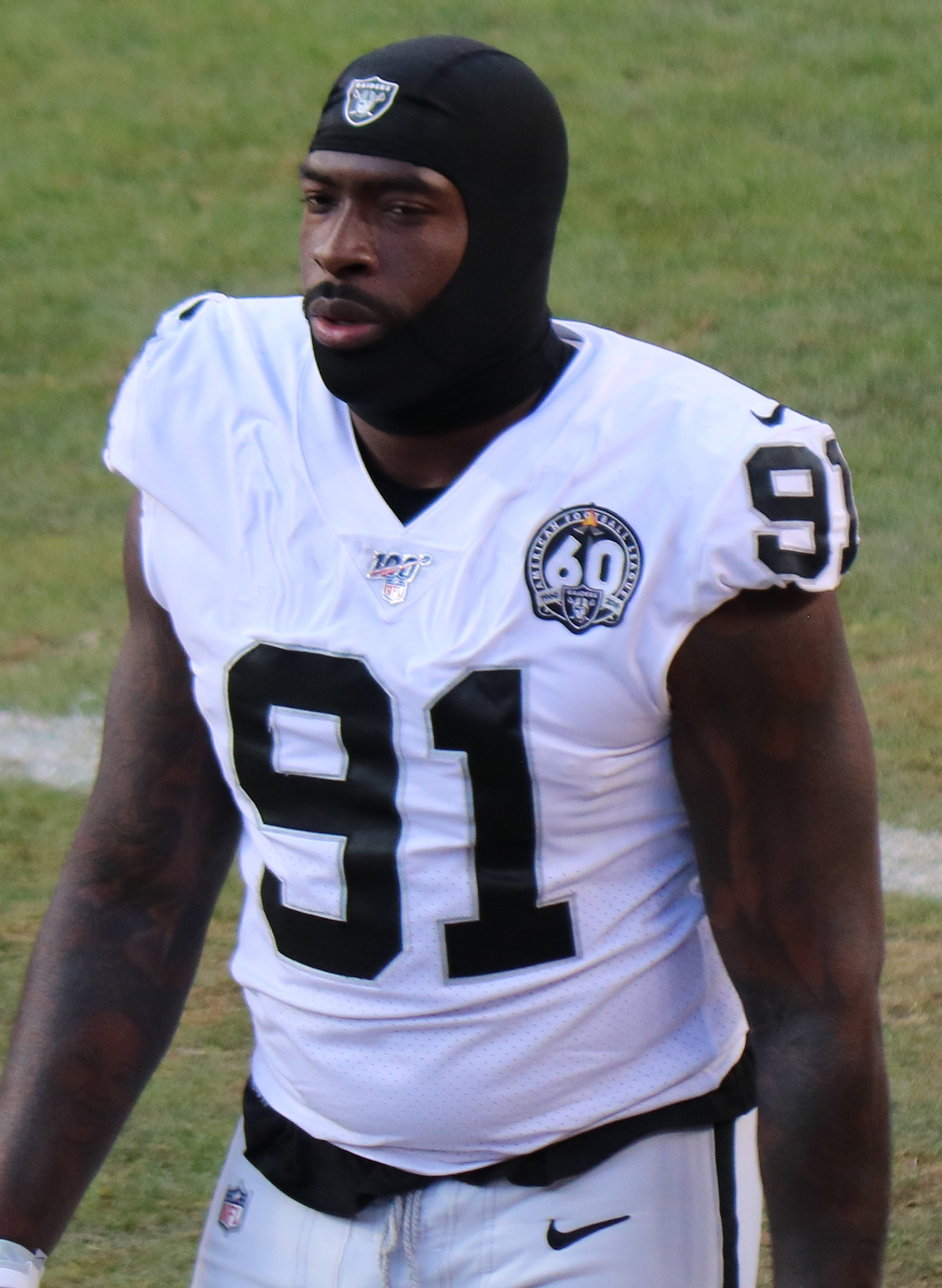
Mayowa with the Raiders in 2019

On April 23, 2018, Mayowa signed with the Arizona Cardinals, to provide depth while defensive end Markus Golden recovered from a torn ACL. He played in 15 games with four starts, recording 38 tackles and four sacks.

=== Oakland Raiders (second stint) ===
On April 12, 2019, Mayowa signed with the Oakland Raiders. In Week 1 against the Denver Broncos, Mayowa sacked Joe Flacco twice in the 24-16 win. In the week 2 defeat to the Kansas City Chiefs he sacked Patrick Mahomes in the 3rd Quarter In week 5 against the Chicago Bears, Mayowa sacked Chase Daniel once in the 24-21 win.

=== Seattle Seahawks (second stint) ===
On April 6, 2020, the Seattle Seahawks signed Mayowa to a one-year, $3 million contract. In Week 17 against the San Francisco 49ers, Mayowa recorded 2 sacks on C. J. Beathard, including a strip sack that was recovered by the Seahawks, during the 26–23 win.

On March 26, 2021, Seahawks re-signed Mayowa to a two-year contract.

On March 17, 2022, Mayowa was released by the Seahawks.

== NFL career statistics ==
Legend
Won the Super Bowl

Year	Team	Games		Tackles				Interceptions						Fumbles			
Year	Team	GP	GS	Comb	Solo	Ast	Sack	PD	Int	Yds	Avg	Lng	TD	FF	FR	Yds	TD
2013	SEA	2	0	2	1	1	0.0	0	0	0	0.0	0	0	0	0	0	0
2014	OAK	16	1	14	9	5	1.0	1	0	0	0.0	0	0	0	0	0	0
2015	OAK	12	2	16	14	2	1.0	0	0	0	0.0	0	0	1	2	40	0
2016	DAL	13	6	25	15	10	6.0	0	0	0	0.0	0	0	1	1	0	0
2017	DAL	14	2	21	13	8	1.0	0	0	0	0.0	0	0	0	0	0	0
2018	ARI	15	4	38	31	7	4.0	4	0	0	0.0	0	0	1	1	0	0
2019	OAK	15	0	15	10	5	7.0	0	0	0	0.0	0	0	3	0	0	0
2020	SEA	13	9	24	19	5	6.0	3	0	0	0.0	0	0	2	1	13	0
2021	SEA	6	3	13	7	6	1.0	0	0	0	0.0	0	0	0	0	0	0
Career		106	27	168	119	49	27.0	8	0	0	0.0	0	0	8	5	53	0

== Personal life ==
Mayowa is of Nigerian descent.
