= Lance Lenoir =

American football player (born 1995)

Lance Lenoir Jr
No. 14
- Position: Wide receiver

Personal information
- Born: February 9, 1995 (age 31); Chicago, Illinois, U.S.
- Listed height: 6 ft 0 in (1.83 m)
- Listed weight: 210 lb (95 kg)

Career information
- High school: Crete-Monee (Crete, Illinois)
- College: Western Illinois
- NFL draft: 2017: undrafted

Career history
- Dallas Cowboys (2017–2019); Seattle Seahawks (2020)*; Buffalo Bills (2021)*; Michigan Panthers (2022); Philadelphia Eagles (2022)*; Los Angeles Rams (2022)*; Orlando Guardians (2023); Michigan Panthers (2024)*
- * Offseason or practice squad member only

Awards and highlights
- USFL receptions leader (2022); All-MFVC All-Newcomer Team (2013); 2× All-MFVC (2014, 2016); Second-team All-MFVC (2015)
- Stats at Pro Football Reference

Lance Lenoir (born February 9, 1995) is an American former professional football player who was a wide receiver in the National Football League (NFL). He played college football for the Western Illinois Leathernecks.

== Early life ==
Lenoir attended Crete-Monee High School, where he was a three-time All-Conference and a two-time All-Area selection at wide receiver. One of his teammates was future NFL wide receiver Laquon Treadwell. As a senior, he helped his team win the Class 6A state championship and received All-state honors.

He finished his high school career with 140 receptions for 1,971 yards, 31 receiving touchdowns and 2 touchdowns on punt returns. He also played baseball 3 year varsity starter.

== College career ==
Lenoir accepted a football scholarship from Western Illinois University. As a freshman, he started all 12 games and became the first freshman in school history to lead the team in receiving yards (489). He also had 39 receptions (second on the team) and 7 receiving touchdowns (freshman record).

As a sophomore, he became one of only five players in school history to register 1,000 receiving yards (1,030) in a single-season, and the only non-senior to reach that milestone. He also had 75 receptions (school record) and 7 touchdowns. Against Northern Arizona University, he made 8 receptions for 132 yards and 2 touchdowns. Against Illinois State University, he had 12 receptions for 195 yards and 2 touchdowns.

As a junior, he recorded 83 receptions (school record), 1,184 receiving yards (school record) and 10 touchdowns. Against Eastern Illinois University, he had a career-high 280 all-purpose yards, of which 156 yards came on kickoff and punt returns, setting the school single-game record with a 52.5-yard average on kickoff returns.

As a senior, he posted 76 receptions for 1,093 yards and 7 touchdowns. Against Northern Arizona University, he set a career-high with 231 receiving yards on 11 receptions and one touchdown. Against Indiana State University, he had 11 receptions for 204 yards and 2 touchdowns. Against Missouri State University, he made 7 receptions for 142 yards. Against the University of South Dakota, he had his first punt returned for a touchdown. Against Illinois State University, he made 11 receptions for 131 yards. He also broke the Missouri Valley Football Conference All-time record for most receptions and finished third in receiving yardage.

He finished his career with 47 starts out of 48 games, becoming the school leader in receptions (273), receiving yards (3,796), touchdowns (31), 100-yard games (14), 200-yard games (2), and consecutive games with a reception (41).

== Professional career ==
On December 21, 2016, it was announced that Lenoir accepted his invitation to play in the NFLPA Collegiate Bowl. On January 21, 2017, Lenoir played in the NFLPA Collegiate Bowl and caught one pass for 12-yards, as he played for Jim Zorn's American team that lost 27–7 to the National. Unfortunately, Lenoir didn't receive an invitation to the NFL Scouting Combine. On March 14, 2017, Lenoir attended Northwestern's Pro Day and performed all of the combine drills. He also attended Western Illinois' pro day on March 30. During the draft process, Lenoir had private workouts and visits with multiple teams, that included the Chicago Bears, Green Bay Packers, Kansas City Chiefs, Oakland Raiders, Miami Dolphins, and Baltimore Ravens. At the conclusion of the pre-draft process, Lenoir was projected to go undrafted and be signed as an undrafted free agent. He was ranked the 113th wide receiver in the draft by NFLDraftScout.com.

Pre-draft measurables
| Height | Weight | 40-yard dash | 10-yard split | 20-yard split | 20-yard shuttle | Three-cone drill | Vertical jump | Broad jump | Bench press |
|---|---|---|---|---|---|---|---|---|---|
| 5 ft 11 5/8 in (1.82 m) | 199 lb (90 kg) | 4.67 s | 1.59 s | 2.66 s | 4.39 s | 6.87 s | 34 1/2 in (0.88 m) | 9 ft 10 in (3.00 m) | 14 reps |
All values from Northwestern's Pro Day

=== Dallas Cowboys ===
On June 13, 2017, Lenoir was signed as an undrafted free agent by the Dallas Cowboys after the 2017 NFL draft. Throughout training camp, Lenoir competed for a roster spot as the fifth or sixth wide receiver on the depth chart. He competed against Brice Butler, Lucky Whitehead, Andy Jones, and Noah Brown. He was waived by the Cowboys on September 2, and was signed to the practice squad the next day. He was promoted to the active roster on December 29.

On September 1, 2018, Lenoir was waived by the Cowboys and was signed to the practice squad the next day. He was promoted to the active roster on November 9. He was waived on December 24, and re-signed to the practice squad. On January 8, he was promoted back to the active roster after wide receiver Allen Hurns was placed on the injured reserve list.

In 2019, he got injured in training camp. He was waived with a knee injury on August 7. He was placed on the injured reserve list on August 9. After the 2019 season, Lenoir was waived by the Cowboys on April 21, 2020.

=== Seattle Seahawks ===
On August 31, 2020, Lenoir signed with the Seattle Seahawks. He was waived on September 5, and was re-signed to the practice squad the next day. Lenoir was released from the practice squad on September 17. He was re-signed to the practice squad on September 24. Lenoir was released again on October 7.

=== Buffalo Bills ===
On May 26, 2021, Lenoir signed with the Buffalo Bills. He was waived by Buffalo on August 24.

=== Michigan Panthers (first stint) ===
Lenoir was selected with the third pick of the 14th round of the 2022 USFL draft by the Michigan Panthers. He was named a starter at wide receiver, registering 52 receptions (led the league), 484 receiving yards (second in the league) and two receiving touchdowns.

=== Philadelphia Eagles ===
On July 27, 2022, Lenoir was signed by the Philadelphia Eagles. On August 16, he was waived/injured and reverted to the injured reserve. On August 22, he was waived with an injury settlement.

=== Los Angeles Rams ===
On December 22, 2022, Lenoir signed with the practice squad of the Los Angeles Rams. His practice squad contract expired when the team's season ended on January 9, 2023.

=== Orlando Guardians ===
Lenoir signed with the Orlando Guardians of the XFL on February 23, 2023. He was placed on the team's reserve list on March 27. He was removed from the roster after the 2023 season.

=== Michigan Panthers (second stint) ===
On February 25, 2024, Lenoir signed with the Michigan Panthers of the United Football League (UFL). He asked for a release for personal reasons on March 10. Lenoir has since ended his playing career.
