= Jordan Carrell =

American football player (born 1994)

No. 69
- Position: Defensive tackle

Personal information
- Born: June 30, 1994 (age 32); Elk Grove, California, U.S.
- Listed height: 6 ft 3 in (1.91 m)
- Listed weight: 300 lb (136 kg)

Career information
- High school: Roseville (CA)
- College: Colorado
- NFL draft: 2017: 7th round, 246th overall pick

Career history
- Dallas Cowboys (2017)*
- * Offseason or practice squad member only
- Stats at Pro Football Reference

Jordan Carrell (born June 30, 1994) is an American former football defensive tackle. He played college football for the Colorado Buffaloes, and was selected by the Dallas Cowboys in the seventh round of the 2017 NFL draft.

== Early life ==
Carrell attended Roseville High School, where he was a two-way player on the football team. He became a starter as a junior, playing center and defensive end.

As a senior, he contributed to an offense that averaged 439 yards (231 rushing) and 33.4 points per game, while not allowing a quarterback sack. On defense, he registered 31 tackles (6 for loss), 2 sacks, 10 quarterback hurries and 2 interceptions (in one game). He suffered a wrist injury in the playoffs and had to wait seven months to get surgery, while he was saving for the procedure.

He was also a three-year letterman in baseball (pitcher, first baseman and third baseman).

== College career ==
Carrell didn't receive any college offers and moved on to American River College, becoming a defensive starter as a freshman, making 30 tackles, 10 tackles for loss, 4 sacks, 4 passes defensed, 11 quarterback hurries, one interception, 2 fumble recoveries and one blocked field goal.

The next year, he posted 80 tackles (19 for loss), 8 quarterback sacks, 24 quarterback hurries, 2 passes defensed and one forced fumble, while receiving ACCFCA All-American, All-California Region I, All-Norcal Conference and the conference's Defensive Player of the Year honors. At the end of the year, he transferred to the University of Colorado Boulder.

As a junior, he started in 12 of 13 games at defensive end in the team's 3–4 defense, registering 52 tackles (seventh on the team), 8 tackles for loss, 11 quarterback hurries and 3 forced fumbles (led the team) and one fumble recovery. He had a career-high 10 tackles in the season finale against the University of Utah.

As a senior, he started all 14 games, making 51 tackles, 5½ sacks (second on the team) and 13 quarterback hurries. He had a career-high 1.5 sacks and 7 tackles (3 for loss) against the University of Oregon. He finished his career with 26 starts out of 27 games, while posting 103 tackles, 24 quarterback hurries and 5½ sacks.

== Professional career ==
Carrell was selected by the Dallas Cowboys in the seventh round (246th overall) of the 2017 NFL draft, to assure obtaining his rights, after he was considering signing with the Buffalo Bills as an undrafted free agent. On May 11, he signed a four-year, $2.46 million contract that includes a signing bonus of $67,484. He was waived on September 2.

== Personal life ==
In 2016, he dedicated his senior season in memory of his father, who had died from a heart attack.
