= Brice Butler =

American football player (born 1990)

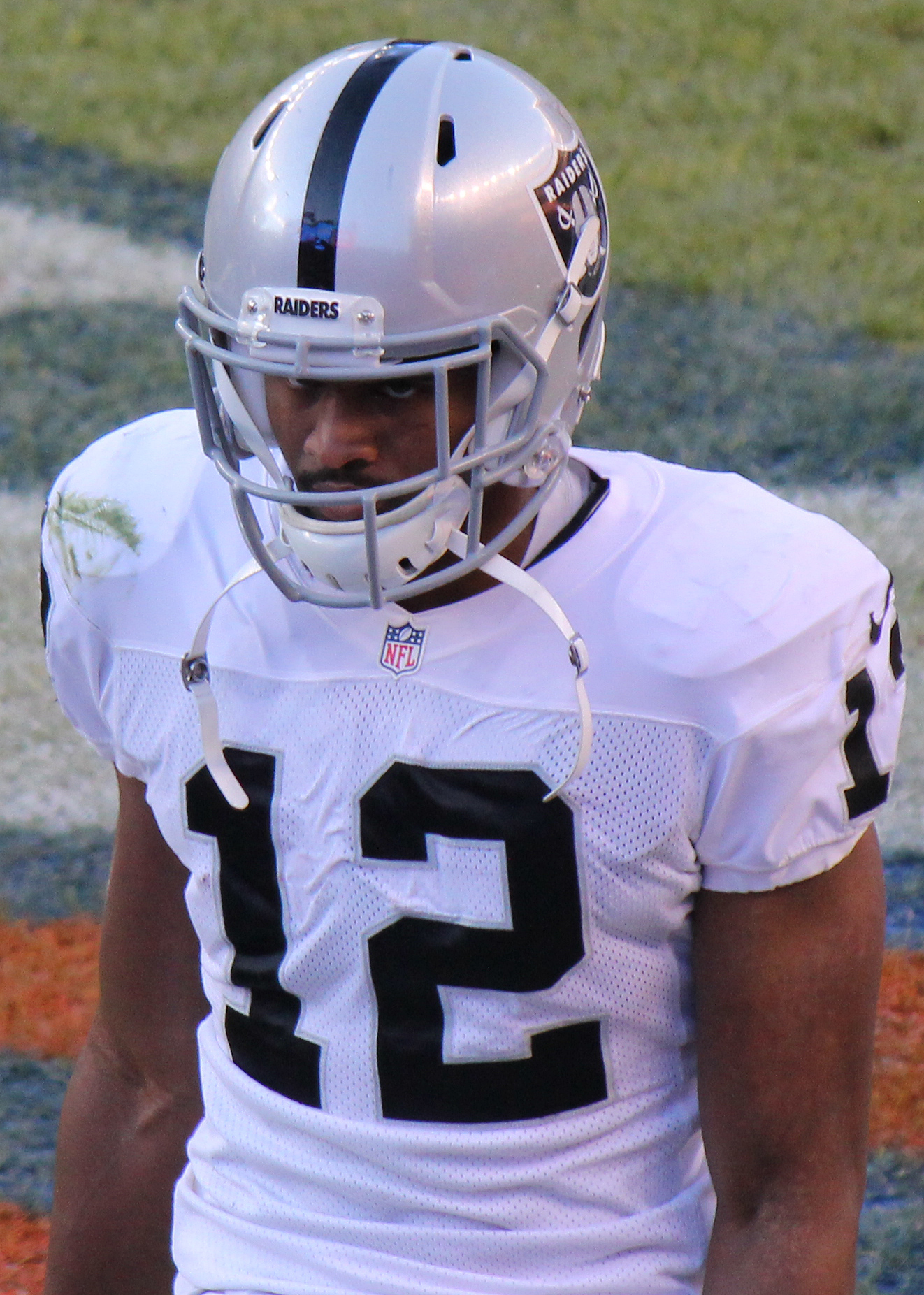
- Butler with the Oakland Raiders in 2014

No. 12, 14, 19
- Position: Wide receiver

Personal information
- Born: January 29, 1990 (age 36); Norcross, Georgia, U.S.
- Listed height: 6 ft 3 in (1.91 m)
- Listed weight: 211 lb (96 kg)

Career information
- High school: Norcross
- College: USC (2008–2011); San Diego State (2012)
- NFL draft: 2013: 7th round, 209th overall pick

Career history
- Oakland Raiders (2013–2015); Dallas Cowboys (2015–2017); Arizona Cardinals (2018)*; Dallas Cowboys (2018); Miami Dolphins (2018)
- * Offseason or practice squad member only

Career NFL statistics
- Receptions: 79
- Receiving yards: 1,237
- Receiving touchdowns: 9
- Stats at Pro Football Reference

Brice Christian Butler (born January 29, 1990) is an American former professional football player who was a wide receiver in the National Football League (NFL). He played college football for the USC Trojans and San Diego State Aztecs and was selected by the Oakland Raiders in the seventh round of the 2013 NFL draft. Butler was also a member of the Dallas Cowboys, Arizona Cardinals, and Miami Dolphins.

== Early life ==
Butler attended Norcross (GA) in Norcross, Georgia, where he played football as a wide receiver. As a junior in 2006, Butler had 35 receptions for 680 yards and nine touchdowns. His 2007 honors included Super Prep All-American, Prep Star All-American, ESPN 150, Super Prep Elite 50, Prep Star Dream Team, Super Prep All-Dixie, Prep Star All-Southeast and Atlanta Journal-Constitution Super Southern 100 as a senior after totaling 1,186 receiving yards with 15 touchdowns.

Butler also competed in track & field at Norcross. As a sophomore, he participated at the state meet in the 4 × 100 m relay, finishing seventh with a time of 42.54 seconds. At the Region 7-5A Meet, Butler helped lead his 4 × 400 m relay team to victory with a time of 3:22.82 minutes. He also posted personal-best times of 22.7 seconds in the 200-meter dash and 50.33 seconds in the 400-meter dash as a junior.

== College career ==
Butler accepted a football scholarship from the University of Southern California. His best season came as a redshirt freshman, when he recorded 20 receptions for 292 yards and two touchdowns, while earning Pac-10 All-Freshman honors. The following year, head coach Pete Carroll left for the NFL and Lane Kiffin was hired to replace him. During his three years with the team, Butler was a backup wide receiver who posted 41 receptions for 554 yards and three touchdowns.

After graduating in 2011 with a major in public policy, management and planning, Butler transferred to San Diego State University to play his final season and enroll in a master's program. Butler had 24 receptions for 347 yards and four touchdowns.

== Professional career ==
Pre-draft measurables
| Height | Weight | 40-yard dash | 10-yard split | 20-yard split | 20-yard shuttle | Three-cone drill | Vertical jump | Broad jump |
|---|---|---|---|---|---|---|---|---|
| 6 ft 3 1/4 in (1.91 m) | 214 lb (97 kg) | 4.37 s | 1.54 s | 2.58 s | 4.40 s | 6.70 s | 39 in (0.99 m) | 10 ft 9 in (3.28 m) |
All values from Pro Day

=== Oakland Raiders ===
Butler was selected by the Oakland Raiders in the seventh round (209th overall) of the 2013 NFL draft, after running 4.37 seconds in the 40-yard dash in his pro day workout. As a rookie, he appeared in 10 games with two starts, tallying nine receptions for 103 yards in 10 games. Butler did not have a catch after Week 6 and was declared inactive for five games.

In 2014, Butler appeared in 15 games, registering 21 receptions for 280 yards and two touchdowns. He recovered a blocked punt for a touchdown against the Seattle Seahawks.

=== Dallas Cowboys ===
On September 15, 2015, Butler was traded to the Dallas Cowboys along with a sixth round pick (#189- used for Anthony Brown), in exchange for a fifth-round pick (#143- used for DeAndré Washington). This occurred after Dez Bryant was injured in the season opener.

Butler passed Devin Street on the depth chart as the team's fourth wide receiver. Against the New Orleans Saints, Butler had a 67-yard reception but suffered a hamstring injury in the play, which would limit him for six weeks. Butler played the majority of the final two games, totaling eight receptions for 134 yards. His most productive game came in the Week 16 against the Buffalo Bills, making four receptions for 74 yards. Butler registered a total of 12 receptions for 258 yards (21.5-yard average) in seven games.

In 2016, Butler worked with the first unit during OTAs while Bryant recovered from a broken foot. He started in Week 4 against the San Francisco 49ers in place of an injured Bryant and scored his first touchdown with the Cowboys. Butler also started the next two games against the Cincinnati Bengals and the Green Bay Packers. He was the team's fourth wide receiver, but suffered through inconsistent play and in some games with untimely penalties.

Butler finished with 16 receptions for 219 yards and three touchdowns. In the Divisional Round against the Green Bay Packers, he had a rarely called illegal substitution penalty, negating a 22-yard play and costing the team an additional 15 yards while also having a key drop in the end zone during the 34–31 loss.

On March 8, 2017, the Cowboys re-signed Butler to a one-year contract. He had a strong preseason and there was an expectation of him being more of a factor in the offense. In the first five games, Butler had eight receptions for 207 yards and two touchdowns before suffering a foot injury in practice that forced him to miss three games. In the season finale against the Philadelphia Eagles, Butler caught a 30-yard touchdown for the only points in a 6–0 road victory. He remained as the fourth wide receiver, appearing in 13 games, while making 15 receptions for 317 yards and three touchdowns.

=== Arizona Cardinals ===
On April 2, 2018, Butler signed a two-year contract with the Arizona Cardinals. He was released on September 1.

=== Dallas Cowboys (second stint) ===
On September 18, 2018, Butler re-signed with the Cowboys, who were struggling using a wide receiver-by-committee approach after the release of Dez Bryant. Butler was released on October 22 to make room for newly acquired wide receiver Amari Cooper.

=== Miami Dolphins ===
On November 14, 2018, Butler signed with the Miami Dolphins. He was released during final roster cuts on August 31, 2019.

== Career statistics ==
=== NFL ===
| Year | Team | Games | | Receiving | | | | | Fumbles | |
| Year | Team | GP | GS | Rec | Yds | Avg | Lng | TD | Fum | Lost |
|---|---|---|---|---|---|---|---|---|---|---|
| 2013 | OAK | 10 | 2 | 9 | 103 | 11.4 | 29 | 0 | 0 | 0 |
| 2014 | OAK | 15 | 0 | 21 | 280 | 13.3 | 55 | 2 | 0 | 0 |
| 2015 | DAL | 7 | 2 | 12 | 258 | 21.5 | 67 | 0 | 0 | 0 |
| 2016 | DAL | 16 | 3 | 16 | 219 | 13.7 | 41 | 3 | 0 | 0 |
| 2017 | DAL | 13 | 0 | 15 | 317 | 21.1 | 53 | 3 | 0 | 0 |
| 2018 | MIA | 6 | 1 | 6 | 60 | 10.0 | 23 | 1 | 0 | 0 |
| Total | | 67 | 8 | 79 | 1,237 | 15.7 | 67 | 9 | 0 | 0 |

=== College ===
| Season | Team | Conf | Pos | GP | Receiving | | | |
| Season | Team | Conf | Pos | GP | Rec | Yds | Avg | TD |
|---|---|---|---|---|---|---|---|---|
| 2009 | USC | Pac-10 | WR | 13 | 20 | 292 | 14.6 | 2 |
| 2010 | USC | Pac-10 | WR | 12 | 9 | 112 | 12.4 | 1 |
| 2011 | USC | Pac-12 | WR | 11 | 12 | 150 | 12.5 | 0 |
| 2012 | San Diego State | MWC | WR | 13 | 24 | 347 | 14.5 | 4 |
| Career | | | | 49 | 65 | 901 | 13.9 | 7 |

== Personal life ==
Butler's father, Bobby, played 12 years for the Atlanta Falcons as a defensive back. His brother, Brenton, played professional basketball with the RSV Eintracht Stahnsdorf of the ProB league in Germany.

Butler married WNBA player Briana Gilbreath in 2014. He also runs a self named YouTube channel (Brice Butler) that revolves around golf.
