= Ryan Davis (defensive end) =

American gridiron football player (born 1989)

No. 56, 59, 75
- Position: Defensive end

Personal information
- Born: February 24, 1989 (age 37); Tampa, Florida, U.S.
- Listed height: 6 ft 2 in (1.88 m)
- Listed weight: 260 lb (118 kg)

Career information
- High school: Howard W. Blake (Tampa)
- College: Bethune-Cookman
- NFL draft: 2012: undrafted

Career history

Playing
- Jacksonville Jaguars (2012–2015); Dallas Cowboys (2016); Buffalo Bills (2017); Los Angeles Rams (2018)*; Orlando Apollos (2019); Toronto Argonauts (2020)*
- * Offseason or practice squad member only

Coaching
- New York Jets (2023) Coaching Intern; New York Jets (2024) Defensive Assistant

Awards and highlights
- Third-team FCS All-American (2011); HBCU All-American (2011); All-MEAC (2011); Second-team All-MEAC (2010); MEAC Defensive Player of the Year (2011)

Career NFL statistics
- Total tackles: 64
- Sacks: 14
- Forced fumbles: 4
- Fumble recoveries: 4
- Interceptions: 1
- Pass deflections: 3
- Stats at Pro Football Reference

Ryan Davis Sr. (born February 24, 1989) is an American former professional football player who was a defensive end in the National Football League (NFL). He was signed by the Jacksonville Jaguars as an undrafted free agent in 2012. He played college football for the Bethune–Cookman Wildcats.

== Early life ==
Davis attended Howard W. Blake High School, where he was a two-way player at tight end and defensive end. He received All-Conference and Hillsborough County All-Star honors as a senior.

He also competed in basketball at small forward. As a senior, he was named second-team All-County, Western Conference Player of the Year and Hillsborough County Slam Dunk Champion.

== College career ==
Davis accepted a football scholarship from Bethune–Cookman University. As a freshman, he appeared in 7 games as a backup, tallying 9 tackles (one for loss) and one fumble recovery for a touchdown.

As a sophomore, he started at defensive end, posting 55 tackles (fourth on the team) 3.5 sacks (led the team), 9 tackles for loss (third on the team) and 2 forced fumbles (led the team). He had game-saving tackle at the goal line on fourth down, that helped preserve a win against Savannah State University. He made 9 tackles (7 solo) in a 9–7 win against Delaware State University. He had 7 tackles against Winston-Salem State University.

As a junior, he started in 10 out of 12 games, totaling 57 tackles (third on the team), 6.5 sacks (led the team), 8 quarterback pressures, 18 tackles for loss (led the team), one interception and 2 forced fumbles.

As a senior, he posted 65 tackles (40 solo), 12 sacks (led conference), 17 quarterback hurries, 21.5 tackles for loss (second in the conference), 8 forced fumbles (led the team), 2 fumble recoveries and one safety. He finished his college career with 190 tackles, 22 sacks, 49.5 tackles for loss and 12 forced fumbles.

== Professional career ==
Pre-draft measurables
Height	Weight	40-yard dash	10-yard split	20-yard split	20-yard shuttle	Three-cone drill	Vertical jump	Broad jump	Bench press
6 ft 2 1/2 in (1.89 m)	261 lb (118 kg)	4.84 s	1.68 s	2.76 s	4.44 s	7.45 s	33.0 in (0.84 m)	9 ft 9 in (2.97 m)	21 reps
All values from Pro Day

=== Jacksonville Jaguars ===
==== 2012 season ====
Davis was signed as an undrafted free agent by the Jacksonville Jaguars after the 2012 NFL draft on April 29. On August 31, he was waived and later signed to the team's practice squad one day later on September 1.

On October 5, he was promoted to the active roster. He was released on October 23 and re-signed to the practice squad the next day. He was again released from the practice squad on November 21 and re-signed to the practice squad five days later on November 26. He was promoted to the active roster on December 31.

==== 2013 season ====
On August 30, 2013, he was released and signed to the team's practice squad on September 1. He was promoted to the active roster on November 15.

During the season, Davis had two game ending plays against the Houston Texans. When the Jaguars played the Texans in Houston in November, Davis made a game ending interception. In a December victory in Jacksonville, Davis sacked Houston quarterback Matt Schaub while the Texans did not have any timeouts remaining and the clock ran out. He totaled 7 tackles (2 for loss), one sack, one interception and one pass defensed.

==== 2014 season ====
Davis was active for all 16 games as part of the defensive line rotation. He posted 17 tackles (7 for loss), 6.5 sacks, 2 passes defensed, 2 forced fumbles, 2 fumble recoveries and 3 special teams tackles.

==== 2015 season ====
He appeared in 14 games as a backup at defensive end, making 7 tackles (5 for loss), 3.5 sacks, one forced fumble and one fumble recovery

==== 2016 season ====
In training camp, he was moved to the strongside linebacker behind Dan Skuta. On September 3, 2016, he was released by the Jaguars, who were going younger at the defensive end position with the additions of Dante Fowler and Yannick Ngakoue.

=== Dallas Cowboys ===
On September 13, 2016, Davis was signed as a free agent by the Dallas Cowboys, who were looking to improve their depth at the defensive end position with the suspensions to DeMarcus Lawrence and Randy Gregory.

He was declared inactive for the second game of the season and missed two additional contests with a strained hamstring. In the fifth game against the Cincinnati Bengals, his role in the defensive line rotation increased after passing defensive end Benson Mayowa on the depth chart, but because he didn't have an impact pressuring the quarterback in the following contests, Mayowa regained his spot in the twelfth game against the Minnesota Vikings. Davis was declared inactive in three games, before being activated against the Detroit Lions, but suffered a knee injury and did not play many snaps. He was placed on the injured reserve list on December 28. He finished the season with 3 tackles (one for loss), 6 quarterback pressures and one fumble recovery. He was released on March 9, 2017.

=== Buffalo Bills ===
On March 13, 2017, Davis signed with the Buffalo Bills, who were changing to a 4-3 defense under new head coach Sean McDermott. He appeared in 16 games playing multiple positions along the defensive line as a backup, while recording 26 tackles (5 for loss), 3 sacks (tied for second on the team) and one forced fumble.

On March 26, 2018, Davis was released by the Bills, after the team signed defensive ends Trent Murphy and Owa Odighizuwa.

=== Los Angeles Rams ===
On July 24, 2018, Davis was signed by the Los Angeles Rams, with the intention of playing him at outside linebacker in a 3-4 defense. He was placed on injured reserve on August 31. He was released with an injury settlement on September 4.

=== Orlando Apollos ===
In 2019, Davis joined the Orlando Apollos of the Alliance of American Football as an outside linebacker in a 3-4 defense. In the season opener against the Atlanta Legends, Davis recorded the first sack in Apollos franchise history during the 40–6 victory.

In the Week 2 game against the San Antonio Commanders, he suffered a bruise to his spinal area that pulled him out of the game. He was placed on the injured reserve list on March 5. The league ceased operations in April. He appeared in 2 games at defensive end, making 4 tackles and one sack.

=== Toronto Argonauts ===
On December 20, 2019, Davis was signed by the Toronto Argonauts of the Canadian Football League, with the intention of playing him at defensive end. After the CFL canceled the 2020 season due to the COVID-19 pandemic, Davis chose to opt-out of his contract with the Argonauts on August 28, 2020.
