= Kadeem Edwards =

American football player (born 1991)

No. 71, 78
- Position: Guard

Personal information
- Born: January 24, 1991 (age 35); Sanford, Florida, U.S.
- Listed height: 6 ft 4 in (1.93 m)
- Listed weight: 313 lb (142 kg)

Career information
- High school: Seminole (Sanford)
- College: Tennessee State
- NFL draft: 2014: 5th round, 143rd overall pick

Career history
- Tampa Bay Buccaneers (2014); Jacksonville Jaguars (2015–2016)*; Dallas Cowboys (2016–2018)
- * Offseason or practice squad member only

Awards and highlights
- Second-team FCS All-American (2013); 2× All-OVC (2012, 2013); Second-team All-OVC (2011)
- Stats at Pro Football Reference

Kadeem Edwards (born January 24, 1991) is an American former professional football offensive guard in the National Football League (NFL) for the Tampa Bay Buccaneers, Jacksonville Jaguars, and Dallas Cowboys. He was selected by the Buccaneers in the fifth round of the 2014 NFL draft. He played college football at Tennessee State University.

== Early life ==
Edwards attended Seminole High School. As a senior in 2009, he helped the team win the State Championship title, coming back from a 21-point deficit. He received third-team 6A All-State honors.

== College career ==
Edwards accepted a college football scholarship from Tennessee State University. As a redshirt freshman, he started 9 out of 10 games, while sharing duties at left guard. As a sophomore, he started the first 10 games of the season.

As a junior, he started all 11 games. As a senior, he was the team's top lineman, starting 13 games at left guard, while helping the school achieve a 10–4 overall record and second place in the Ohio Valley Conference. He finished his college career with 41 starts out of 45 games.

== Professional career ==
=== Tampa Bay Buccaneers ===
Edwards was selected by the Tampa Bay Buccaneers in the fifth round (143rd overall pick) of the 2014 NFL draft. He signed his four-year rookie deal on May 16. He was declared inactive for the first 9 games. On November 11, he was placed on the injured reserve list with a foot injury.

He was waived on September 6, 2015. On September 7, he was placed on the injured reserve list with a foot injury. On September 14, he was released from injured reserve.

=== Jacksonville Jaguars ===
On November 9, 2015, Edwards was signed to the practice squad of the Jacksonville Jaguars. On September 3, 2016, he was released by the Jaguars.

=== Dallas Cowboys ===
On November 8, 2016, Edwards was signed to the Dallas Cowboys practice squad. He signed a reserve/future contract with the Cowboys on January 16, 2017.

On September 2, 2017, Edwards was waived by the Cowboys and was signed to the practice squad the next day. On December 29, 2017, he was promoted to the active roster after left tackle Tyron Smith was placed on the injured reserve list.

On September 11, 2018, Edwards was released, after the Cowboys claimed center Adam Redmond off waivers.
