= Lewis Neal (American football) =

American football player (born 1995)

No. 66
- Position: Defensive tackle

Personal information
- Born: May 17, 1995 (age 31); Greensboro, North Carolina, U.S.
- Listed height: 6 ft 0 in (1.83 m)
- Listed weight: 280 lb (127 kg)

Career information
- High school: James B. Hunt (Wilson, North Carolina)
- College: LSU
- NFL draft: 2017: undrafted

Career history
- Dallas Cowboys (2017); BC Lions (2021)*
- * Offseason or practice squad member only

Career NFL statistics
- Games played: 7
- Total tackles: 8
- Sacks: 0
- Forced fumbles: 0
- Stats at Pro Football Reference

Lewis Matthew Neal (born May 17, 1995) is an American former professional football player who was a defensive tackle in the National Football League (NFL) for the Dallas Cowboys. He played college football for the LSU Tigers.

== Early life ==
Neal attended James B. Hunt High School. As a senior he registered 68 tackles, eight sacks and one safety. He played offense and defense at the All-American Bowl where he was named Defensive MVP. He was rated as a three-star recruit by Rivals.com.

He accepted a football scholarship from Louisiana State University. He was a backup defensive end as a freshman, and was a backup at defensive tackle the following year.

As a junior, he became a starter at defensive end, leading the team with eight sacks (tied for 10th in school history), while collecting 48 tackles (9.5 for loss), eight quarterback hurries and six passes defensed. He had a dominant game against the University of Florida, posting three sacks (tied for second in school history), 10 tackles (3.5 for loss), three quarterback hurries and one pass deflected.

As a senior, he started at defensive end in the team's new 3-4 defense. He tallied 60 tackles (5.5 tackles for loss), 3.5 sacks and three quarterback hurries. He made a career-high 11 tackles in a 10–0 loss against the University of Alabama. He was a part of a defense that allowed only 16 touchdowns, while ranking second in the Southeastern Conference in scoring (15.8 points per game) and third in total defense (314.4 yards per game).

Neal finished his college career playing in 47 games (24 starts), recording 118 tackles (17 for loss), 12 sacks, 12 quarterback hurries, seven passes defensed, two fumble recoveries and one forced fumble.

== Professional career ==
=== Dallas Cowboys ===
Neal was signed as an undrafted free agent by the Dallas Cowboys after the 2017 NFL draft on May 12. He was waived on September 2, and was signed to the practice squad the next day. On November 8, he was promoted to the active roster to replace an injured Brian Price. Although he was considered undersized for the position, he was used as a backup defensive tackle in seven games.

On September 1, 2018, Neal was waived by the Cowboys.

=== BC Lions ===
On January 5, 2021, Neal signed with the BC Lions of the Canadian Football League, after being out of football for 2 years. He was released on July 19, 2021.
