= Damontre Moore =

American gridiron football player (born 1992)

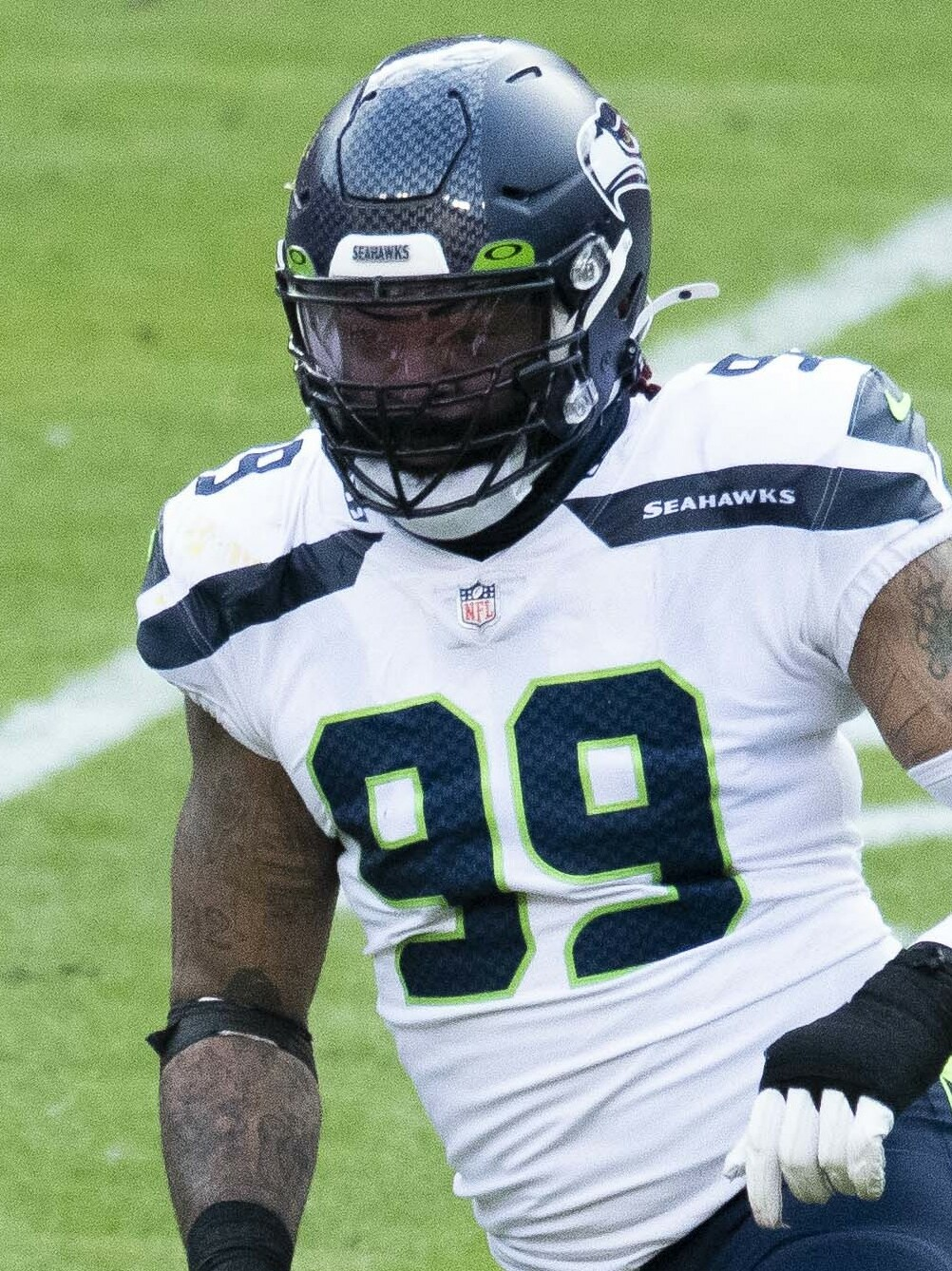
- Moore with the Seattle Seahawks in 2020

Profile
- Position: Defensive end

Personal information
- Born: September 11, 1992 (age 34); DeSoto, Texas, U.S.
- Listed height: 6 ft 4 in (1.93 m)
- Listed weight: 260 lb (118 kg)

Career information
- High school: Rowlett (Rowlett, Texas)
- College: Texas A&M (2010–2012)
- NFL draft: 2013: 3rd round, 81st overall pick

Career history
- New York Giants (2013–2015); Miami Dolphins (2015); Oakland Raiders (2016)*; Seattle Seahawks (2016); Dallas Cowboys (2017); Oakland Raiders (2018); San Diego Fleet (2019); San Francisco 49ers (2019); Seattle Seahawks (2020); Indianapolis Colts (2021)*; Carolina Panthers (2021)*; Toronto Argonauts (2022); Montreal Alouettes (2023)*; Calgary Stampeders (2023)
- * Offseason or practice squad member only

Awards and highlights
- Grey Cup champion (2022); Consensus All-American (2012); First-team All-SEC (2012)

Career NFL statistics
- Total tackles: 97
- Sacks: 11.0
- Forced fumbles: 4
- Fumble recoveries: 1
- Stats at Pro Football Reference
- Stats at CFL.ca

Damontre Lamounte Moore (born September 11, 1992) is an American professional football defensive end. He was selected by the New York Giants in the third round of the 2013 NFL draft. He played college football at Texas A&M, where he earned All-American honors.

== Early life ==
Moore was born in DeSoto, Texas. He attended Rowlett High School in Rowlett, Texas, where he played for the Rowlett Eagles high school football team. As a senior, he had 66 tackles and six quarterback sacks.

== College career ==
Moore attended Texas A&M University, where he played for the Texas A&M Aggies football team from 2010 to 2012. As a backup linebacker as a freshman in 2010, he recorded 40 tackles, 5.5 quarterback sacks and an interception. As a first-year starter as a sophomore in 2011, he had 72 tackles and 8.5 sacks. As a junior in 2012, he was a consensus first-team All-American and a first-team All-Southeastern Conference (SEC) selection after recording 85 tackles and 12.5 sacks. Over three seasons, he compiled 26.5 sacks, which ranks sixth in school history.

== Professional career ==
Pre-draft measurables
Height	Weight	Arm length	Hand span	40-yard dash	10-yard split	20-yard split	20-yard shuttle	Three-cone drill	Vertical jump	Broad jump	Bench press
6 ft 4 1/2 in (1.94 m)	250 lb (113 kg)	34 3/4 in (0.88 m)	10 1/4 in (0.26 m)	4.95 s	1.72 s	2.87 s	4.33 s	7.08 s	35 1/2 in (0.90 m)	10 ft 2 in (3.10 m)	12 reps
All values from NFL Combine.

Moore was initially projected to be a top ten draft pick at the end of the 2012 season. One of his strengths was his versatility while playing in Texas A&M. Where he played as 3-4 outside linebacker in his first two seasons and tallied a total of 14 sacks in that time span. In 2012 as the starting defensive end he exploded with 12.5 sacks. Despite his previous accomplishments, his status as a top ten pick was damaged because of his poor performance at the NFL Combine, where he had only 12 reps in the bench press (lowest among defensive linemen) and a 4.95 time in the 40-yard dash. He was projected by many draft analysts to go in the late first or early second round; however, he slid down the draft board and was eventually chosen by the New York Giants in the third round, with the 81st overall pick.

=== New York Giants ===
Though some teams viewed Moore as a 3–4 outside linebacker, the Giants selected him as a 4–3 defensive end. He saw action in 15 games during the regular season, during which time he recorded 11 tackles and 1 forced fumble. The latter occurred during a Monday Night Football game against the Vikings when Moore stripped the ball while playing kickoff coverage.

Moore recorded his first career sack during his second season on September 25, 2014, against the Washington Redskins.

On December 11, 2015, Moore was waived for violating team rules, reportedly due to having an altercation with fellow defensive lineman Cullen Jenkins regarding headphones. The incident with Jenkins was one of several altercations Moore had with teammates during the 2015 season, according to Jay Glazer of Fox Sports.

=== Miami Dolphins ===
On December 14, 2015, Moore was claimed off waivers by the Miami Dolphins. He was released by the team on May 2, 2016.

=== Oakland Raiders (first stint) ===
On May 9, 2016, Moore signed with the Oakland Raiders. He was released on August 5.

=== Seattle Seahawks (first stint) ===
On November 1, 2016, Moore was signed by the Seattle Seahawks. He was placed on the injured reserve list on December 20, after suffering a foot injury. He made 7 tackles and half a sack, while playing in 4 games. The injury forced him to miss 3 of his last 4 contests.

=== Dallas Cowboys ===
On March 10, 2017, Moore was signed as a free agent by the Dallas Cowboys to play defensive end. He was suspended for the first two games of the regular season for violating the NFL's substance abuse policy, which was a situation the Cowboys were aware of before he was signed. On October 24, he was released to create space to sign Mike Nugent following the groin injury to placekicker Dan Bailey. He was a backup player, registering 7 tackles, 4 quarterback hurries in 3 games and was declared inactive in one contest.

=== Oakland Raiders (second stint) ===
On December 4, 2018, Moore was signed by the Raiders. Moore saw action in two games and made one tackle before he was released by the Raiders on December 24, 2018.

=== San Diego Fleet ===
On January 10, 2019, Moore signed with the San Diego Fleet of the Alliance of American Football. He played with the team until the league folded in April. He was considered one of the top defensive players in the league, registering 22 tackles, 7 sacks and one fumble recovery.

=== San Francisco 49ers ===
On April 5, 2019, after operations were suspended in the AAF, Moore signed a contract with the San Francisco 49ers. He was waived on May 16, 2019. He was re-signed on July 24, 2019. He was waived on August 31, 2019. On November 13, 2019, Moore was re-signed due to an injury to Ronald Blair. On November 17, 2019, Moore forced a fumble against the Arizona Cardinals late in the game that keyed a win for the 49ers. He was placed on injured reserve on November 25, 2019, after suffering a broken forearm in Week 12. Without Moore, the 49ers reached Super Bowl LIV, but lost 31-20 to the Kansas City Chiefs.

=== Seattle Seahawks (second stint) ===
Moore signed with the Seahawks on September 3, 2020. In Week 5 against the Minnesota Vikings on Sunday Night Football, Moore recorded his first full sack since 2015, a strip sack on Kirk Cousins which was recovered by the Seahawks, during the 27–26 win. On November 2, 2020, he was suspended six games for a violation of the league's policy on performance-enhancing drugs. He was reinstated from suspension on December 14, 2020.

=== Indianapolis Colts ===
On July 28, 2021, Moore signed with the Indianapolis Colts. He was placed on injured reserve on August 17, 2021, and then was released on August 25, 2021.

=== Carolina Panthers ===
On November 11, 2021, Moore was signed to the Carolina Panthers practice squad. His contract expired when the team's season ended on January 9, 2022.

=== Toronto Argonauts ===
On September 17, 2022, it was announced that Moore had signed with the Toronto Argonauts. He played in one regular season game but suffered an injury and did not play again that year. At the conclusion of 2023 training camp, he was part of the final cuts on June 2, 2023.

=== Montreal Alouettes ===
On September 5, 2023, it was announced that Moore had signed with the Montreal Alouettes practice squad. He was released on October 11, 2023.

=== Calgary Stampeders ===
On October 16, 2023, Moore signed with the Calgary Stampeders. He was promoted to the active roster on October 26 and moved to the practice roster on October 31. Moore was released on November 5, and signed to a futures contract on November 13, 2023. He was released again on June 2, 2024.

== Personal life ==
Moore is a Christian. Moore is married to Tiara Moore. They have one son and one daughter.
