= Duke Thomas (American football) =

American football player (born 1994)

No. 34
- Position: Cornerback

Personal information
- Born: May 21, 1994 (age 32); Middletown, Connecticut, U.S.
- Listed height: 5 ft 11 in (1.80 m)
- Listed weight: 192 lb (87 kg)

Career information
- High school: Copperas Cove (Copperas Cove, Texas)
- College: Texas
- NFL draft: 2016: undrafted

Career history
- Houston Texans (2016)*; Philadelphia Eagles (2016)*; San Francisco 49ers (2016)*; Dallas Cowboys (2017); Toronto Argonauts (2018)*; San Antonio Commanders (2019); Minnesota Vikings (2019)*; Arizona Cardinals (2019–2020)*; Buffalo Bills (2020)*
- * Offseason or practice squad member only
- Stats at Pro Football Reference

Orlando "Duke" Thomas (born May 21, 1994) is an American former football cornerback. He played college football for the Texas Longhorns.

== Early life ==
Duke Thomas was born in Middletown, Connecticut on May 21, 1994. Thomas started playing football at the age of 9. He moved to Louisiana and then moved to Texas at the age of 10. He was a three-time member of the Big 12 Commissioner's Honor Roll, and a member of the inaugural Academic All-Big 12 Rookie Team.

== College career ==
As a freshman, Thomas played as a reserve cornerback and on special teams in all 13 games for the Texas Longhorns. He tied for second on the team with 8 tackles. He put up two tackles against New Mexico and one special teams tackle against West Virginia. Thomas recorded a season-best three tackles against Baylor.

During Thomas' sophomore season he played in all 13 games with 10 starts. He started the first six games at cornerback and had a team best three interceptions while playing against Oklahoma State, Baylor and Oregon. During the Alamo Bowl in 2013 Thomas recorded three tackles and one kickoff return for 21 yards against Oregon.

In Thomas' junior year he earned honorable mention All-Big 12 and led the team with 10 pass breakups and tied for second with three interceptions. He tied for eighth in the Big 12 in passes defended (1.0 per game) and tied for 15th in the Big 12 in interceptions (0.2 per game). Thomas set career-high 53 tackles while posting a tackle and a quarterback pressure against North Texas.

Thomas finished his college career strong earning Honorable mention All-Big 12 and second-team Academic All-Big 12 selections. He started all 12 games and finished third on the team in tackles with 58, and second in with five breakups. He also tied for the most tackles for loss among defensive backs (3). Thomas had at least three tackles in every game, and at least four in seven contests. Thomas wore jersey number 28 against Kansas in honor of Freddie Steinmark while totaling four tackles, one interception and a return of 29 yards at Baylor. He was named the team's co-Defensive Player of the Week.

== Professional career ==
=== Houston Texans ===
Thomas went undrafted during the 2016 NFL draft and signed with the Houston Texans as a college free agent on May 5, 2016. He was waived on August 30, 2016

=== Philadelphia Eagles ===
On October 11, 2016, the Philadelphia Eagles signed Thomas to their practice squad. He was released on October 21, 2016.

=== San Francisco 49ers ===
On December 20, 2016, Thomas was signed to the San Francisco 49ers' practice squad.

=== Dallas Cowboys ===
On January 16, 2017, Thomas signed a futures contract with the Dallas Cowboys. He was placed on injured reserve on September 2, 2017.

On September 1, 2018, Thomas was waived by the Cowboys.

=== Toronto Argonauts (CFL) ===
On October 17, 2018, Thomas was signed to the Toronto Argonauts' practice squad. He was released on November 3, 2018.

=== San Antonio Commanders (AAF) ===
In December 2018, Thomas signed with the San Antonio Commanders of the AAF. Thomas made 22 tackles, defended 4 passes, and caught one interception before the league shut down.

=== Minnesota Vikings ===
On April 5, 2019, Thomas signed with the Minnesota Vikings. He was waived on August 31, 2019.

=== Arizona Cardinals ===
On December 18, 2019, Thomas was signed to the Arizona Cardinals practice squad. He signed a reserve/future contract with the Cardinals on December 30, 2019. He was waived on August 23, 2020.

=== Buffalo Bills ===
On January 1, 2021, Thomas was signed to the Buffalo Bills practice squad. On January 23, 2021, Thomas was released by the Bills.
