= Brian Price (American football, born 1994) =

American football player (born 1994)

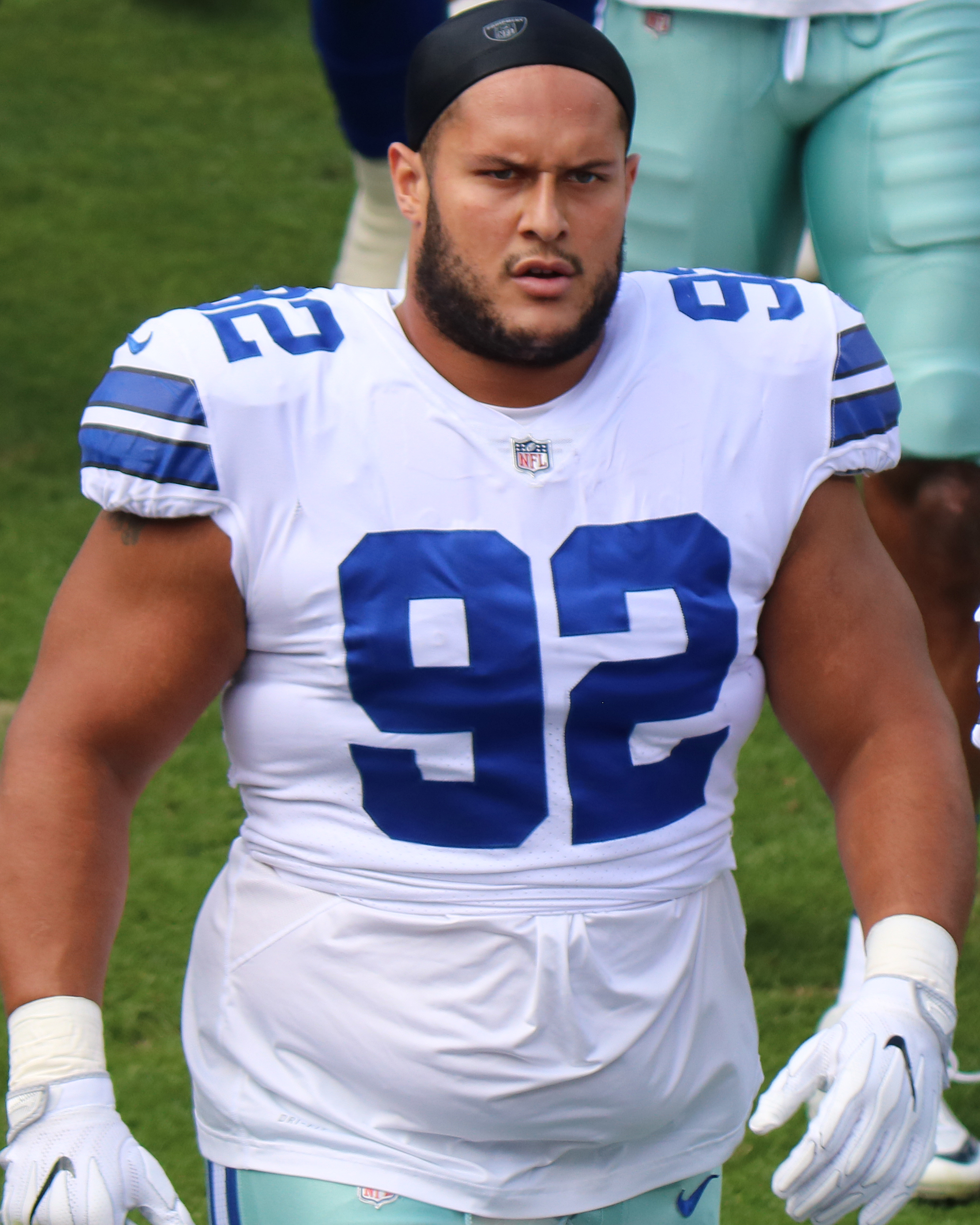
- Price with the Dallas Cowboys in 2017

No. 78, 91, 92, 93, 96
- Position: Nose tackle

Personal information
- Born: June 24, 1994 (age 32); Lafayette, Indiana, U.S.
- Listed height: 6 ft 3 in (1.91 m)
- Listed weight: 322 lb (146 kg)

Career information
- High school: McCutcheon (Lafayette)
- College: UTSA (2013–2015)
- NFL draft: 2016: undrafted

Career history
- Green Bay Packers (2016); Dallas Cowboys (2017); Oakland Raiders (2018); Cleveland Browns (2018); Indianapolis Colts (2019)*; Jacksonville Jaguars (2019)*; Green Bay Packers (2020); Detroit Lions (2021)*
- * Offseason or practice squad member only

Career NFL statistics
- Total tackles: 20
- Stats at Pro Football Reference

Brian Keith Price (born June 24, 1994) is an American former professional football player who was a nose tackle in the National Football League (NFL). He played college football for the UTSA Roadrunners, and was signed by the Green Bay Packers as an undrafted free agent in 2016.

== Early life ==
Price attended McCutcheon High School. As a senior, he received All-state, All-area and All-conference honors at defensive tackle. He enrolled at Allan Hancock College in 2012. He transferred after the season to the University of Texas at San Antonio.

As a freshman, he was a starter at defensive tackle, posting 61 tackles (second on the team), 4 tackles for loss and a half sack in 9 games, receiving a second-team All-Northern Conference honors. As a sophomore he appeared in 12 games (2 starts), making 25 tackles (one for loss) and 4 quarterback hurries.

As a junior, he appeared in 9 games (one start), collecting 23 tackles (2 for loss) and 2 quarterback hurries. As a senior, he started 10 games, registering 33 tackles (2 for loss) and one sack.

=== Statistics ===
Year	Team	G	GS	Tackles			
Year	Team	G	GS	Total	Solo	Ast	Sck
2013	UTSA	12	2	25	7	18	0.0
2014	UTSA	9	1	23	6	17	2.0
2015	UTSA	10	10	33	15	18	1.0
Total		31	13	81	28	53	3.0
Source: GoUTSA.com

== Professional career ==
Pre-draft measurables
Height	Weight	40-yard dash	10-yard split	20-yard split	20-yard shuttle	Three-cone drill	Vertical jump	Broad jump	Bench press	Wonderlic
6 ft 3 in (1.91 m)	322 lb (146 kg)	5.17 s	1.87 s	3.00 s	4.72 s	8.22 s	27 in (0.69 m)	8 ft 7 in (2.62 m)	20 reps	19
All values are from Pro Day

=== Green Bay Packers (first stint) ===
Price was signed as an undrafted free agent by the Green Bay Packers after the 2016 NFL draft on May 6. On September 3, he was released by the Packers during final team cuts and was signed to the practice squad the next day. On September 22, he was promoted from the practice squad to the active roster and made his NFL debut against the Detroit Lions in Week 3. On October 15, he was released by the Packers and re-signed back to the practice squad.

He signed a futures contract with the Packers on January 24, 2017. He was waived on September 2.

=== Dallas Cowboys ===
On September 3, 2017, Price was claimed off waivers by the Dallas Cowboys. He was placed on injured reserve on November 8, after undergoing knee surgery.

On March 12, 2018, Price signed a two-year contract extension with the Cowboys. He was released on September 2, with the intention of re-signing him after Datone Jones was placed on the injured reserve list.

=== Oakland Raiders ===
On September 3, 2018, Price was claimed off waivers by the Oakland Raiders, spoiling the Cowboys' plans of re-signing him. He was waived on September 18, 2018.

=== Cleveland Browns ===
The Cleveland Browns signed Price to their practice squad on September 21, 2018. He was elevated to the main roster on October 4, 2018. Price was waived by the Browns on August 31, 2019.

=== Indianapolis Colts ===
On September 2, 2019, Price was signed to the Indianapolis Colts practice squad. He was released on October 1.

=== Jacksonville Jaguars ===
On October 23, 2019, Price was signed to the Jacksonville Jaguars practice squad. He signed a reserve/future contract with the Jaguars on December 30, 2019.

On August 9, 2020, Price was placed on injured reserve with the knee injury. He was released with an injury settlement on August 17, 2020.

=== Green Bay Packers (second stint) ===
On December 15, 2020, Price was signed to the Green Bay Packers' practice squad. He was elevated to the active roster on December 26 and January 2, 2021, for the team's weeks 16 and 17 games against the Tennessee Titans and Chicago Bears, and reverted to the practice squad after each game. He was again elevated on January 15 and 23 for the team's divisional playoff game against the Los Angeles Rams and NFC Championship Game against the Tampa Bay Buccaneers, and reverted to the practice squad again following each game. His practice squad contract with the team expired after the season on February 1, 2021.

=== Detroit Lions ===
On June 1, 2021, Price signed with the Detroit Lions. He announced his retirement on July 27, 2021.

== NFL career statistics ==
=== Regular season ===
Year	Team	Games		Tackles				Interceptions						Fumbles	
Year	Team	GP	GS	Comb	Total	Ast	Sck	PD	Int	Yds	Avg	Lng	TDs	FF	FR
2016	GB	1	0	0	0	0	0	0	0	0	0	0	0	0	0
2017	GB	8	0	8	5	3	0	1	0	0	0	0	0	0	0
2018	GB	13	0	11	5	6	0	0	0	0	0	0	0	0	0
2018	OAK	1	1	1	0	1	0	0	0	0	0	0	0	0	0
2020	GB	2	0	0	0	0	0	0	0	0	0	0	0	0	0
Total		24	1	20	10	10	0	1	0	0	0	0	0	0	0
Source: NFL.com
