= Kyle Wilber =

American football player and coach (born 1989)

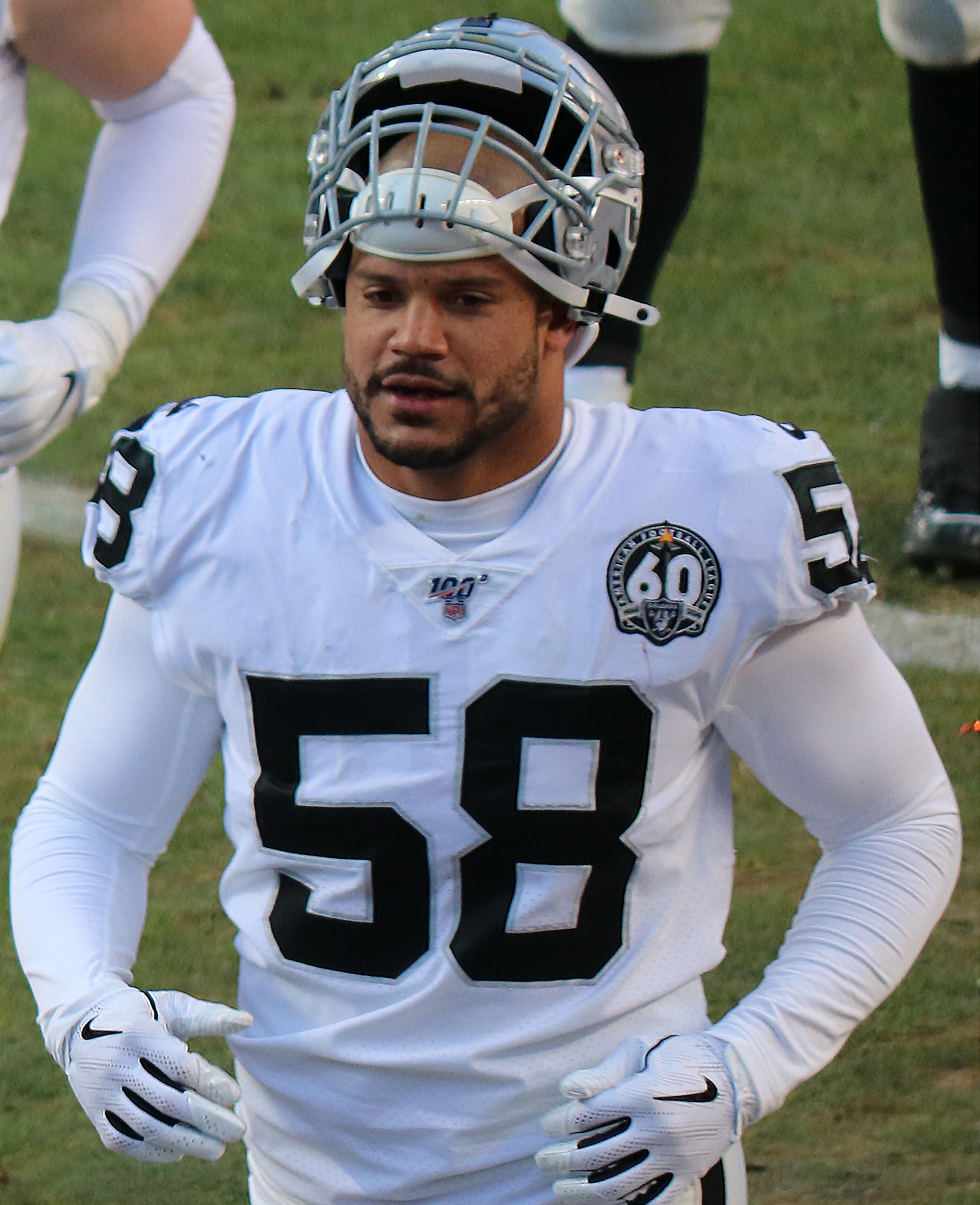
- Wilber with the Oakland Raiders in 2019

New Orleans Saints
- Title: Assistant special teams coach

Personal information
- Born: April 26, 1989 (age 37); Orlando, Florida, U.S.
- Listed height: 6 ft 4 in (1.93 m)
- Listed weight: 240 lb (109 kg)

Career information
- Position: Linebacker (No. 51, 58)
- High school: Apopka (Apopka, Florida)
- College: Wake Forest (2007–2011)
- NFL draft: 2012: 4th round, 113th overall pick

Career history

Playing
- Dallas Cowboys (2012–2017); Oakland / Las Vegas Raiders (2018–2021)

Coaching
- Green Bay Packers (2023–2024) Special teams quality control coach; New Orleans Saints (2025–present) Assistant special teams coach

Career NFL statistics
- Total tackles: 153
- Sacks: 3.5
- Forced fumbles: 3
- Fumble recoveries: 6
- Stats at Pro Football Reference

Kyle Wilber (born April 26, 1989) is an American former professional football linebacker and coach who is the assistant special teams coordinator for the New Orleans Saints of the National Football League (NFL). He was selected by the Dallas Cowboys in the fourth round of the 2012 NFL draft. He played college football for the Wake Forest Demon Deacons.

== Early life ==
Wilber attended Apopka High School where he was a Class 6A all-state third-team selection as a senior, after finishing with 55 tackles (10 for loss), four sacks and a fumble recovery. He also practiced wrestling and weightlifting.

At Wake Forest University he was a 4-3 defensive end until his sophomore season, when there was a change in the defensive scheme and he was moved to the 3-4 Will linebacker position, appearing at that position in 5 games with 18 tackles, one sack, one fumble recovery and a blocked field goal.

As a junior, he began the season at defensive end before being moved back to linebacker, posting 65 tackles (third on the team), 6 sacks (led the team), 14.5 tackles for loss (led the team), one quarterback pressure, 4 passes defensed and 2 blocked kicks.

As a senior, he recorded 70 tackles (second on the team), 3.5 sacks (tied for the team lead), 11.5 tackles for loss, 3 quarterback pressures, 3 forced fumbles, one fumble recovery, one pass defensed and one blocked kick. He finished his college career with 13.5 sacks (sixth in school history), 35.5 tackles (ninth in school history) for loss, 195 tackles (thirteenth in school history), 6 forced fumbles and 4 blocked kicks in 43 career games.

== Professional career ==
=== Pre-draft ===
Wilber was one of 38 collegiate linebackers to attend the NFL Scouting Combine in Indianapolis, Indiana. He completed all of the combine drills and had a mediocre performance. Wilber finished tenth among linebackers in the bench press, 14th in the short shuttle, and seventh in the three-cone drill.

On March 19, 2012, Wilber attended Wake Forest's pro day, along with Chris Givens, Joe Looney, and six other prospects. He opted to run all of the combine drills again, but skipped the bench. Wilber was able to lower his times in the 40-yard dash (4.64s), 20-yard dash (2.65s), and 10-yard dash (1.65s). At the conclusion of the pre-draft process, Wilber was projected to be a third or fourth round pick by NFL draft experts and scouts. He was ranked as the 12th best outside linebacker prospect in the draft by NFLDraftScout.com.

Pre-draft measurables
Height	Weight	Arm length	Hand span	Wingspan	40-yard dash	10-yard split	20-yard split	20-yard shuttle	Three-cone drill	Vertical jump	Broad jump	Bench press
6 ft 3 3/4 in (1.92 m)	249 lb (113 kg)	33 1/4 in (0.84 m)	9 1/4 in (0.23 m)	6 ft 6 in (1.98 m)	4.64 s	1.65 s	2.65 s	4.31 s	7.11 s	33.5 in (0.85 m)	10 ft 0 in (3.05 m)	25 reps
All values from NFL Combine/Pro Day

=== Dallas Cowboys ===
==== 2012 ====
Wilber was selected by the Dallas Cowboys in the fourth round (135th overall) of the 2012 NFL draft. He was the 13th linebacker selected in 2012.

On June 14, the Cowboys signed Wilber to a four-year, $2.53 million contract that includes a signing bonus of $439,220.

Throughout training camp, Wilber competed for a backup outside linebacker role against Victor Butler, Adrian Hamilton, and Alex Albright. He also received work at defensive end, but missed the majority of offseason practices after breaking his right index finger. Wilber was making progress and receiving second-team reps at outside linebacker, but unfortunately suffered a broken thumb in the Cowboys' third preseason game against the Arizona Cardinals. He was expected to miss three to four weeks with the injury. Head coach Jason Garrett named Wilber the fifth outside linebacker on the depth chart to start the regular season, behind DeMarcus Ware, Anthony Spencer, Victor Butler, and Alex Albright.

He made his professional regular season debut on special teams in the Dallas Cowboys' season-opening 19–3 victory against the New York Giants. During a Week 2 matchup at the Denver Broncos, Wilber recorded two solo tackles in the Cowboys' 42–17 loss. On November 30, he tied his season-high of two solo tackles during a 38–14 win over the Washington Redskins. He finished with six special teams tackles and ten total tackles (seven solo) in 16 games. Defensive coordinator Rob Ryan was fired at the end of the season.

==== 2013 ====
Wilber was moved to defensive end in training camp after the Cowboys hired Monte Kiffin as their defensive coordinator and changed the base defense to a 4–3 alignment. Throughout training camp, he competed for the job as backup defensive end against Monte Taylor, Ikponmwosa Igbinosun, and DeVonte Holloman. Wilber gained 15 pounds to his frame during the off-season and was named the backup right defensive end behind DeMarcus Ware to start the regular season.

On September 22, he recorded two solo tackles and made his first career sack on St. Louis Rams' quarterback Sam Bradford in a 31–7 victory. On October 20, Wilber earned his first career start at defensive end after DeMarcus Ware was unable to play due to an elbow injury. He made one solo tackle in the Cowboys' 17-3 win at the Philadelphia Eagles. He could not maintain consistent playing time even with a defensive line that lost many players to injury. Out of necessity, the team was forced to play him at sam linebacker in place of an injured Justin Durant. In Week 13, he made his first career start at outside linebacker and recorded four combined tackle in the 31–24 victory against the Oakland Raiders. The following week, Wilber collected a season-high ten combined tackles during a 45–28 loss at the Chicago Bears. He finished the season with a total of 44 combined tackles (31 solo) and two sacks in six starts and 16 games.

==== 2014 ====
Wilber entered training camp competing for the starting weak side linebacker role after Justin Durant was moved to middle linebacker after Sean Lee tore his ACL in organized team activities. During the preseason he was tried at linebacker and defensive end after DeMarcus Lawrence fractured his foot in training camp. Head coach Jason Garrett named Wilber the backup strong side linebacker to Bruce Carter to begin the regular season. Durant was named the starting weakside linebacker after the Cowboys acquired Rolando McClain and named him the starting middle linebacker.

In the regular season he was used mainly in a reserve pass-rusher role (only 3 starts). On September 14, Wilber made his first start of the season and recorded a season-high nine combined tackles during the Cowboys' 26–10 victory at the Tennessee Titans. In Week 16, he recorded two solo tackles and made his only sack of the season on Indianapolis Colts' quarterback Andrew Luck in a 42–7 victory. He finished the 2014 season with 27 combined tackles (16 solo), two pass deflections, and 1.5 sacks in 16 games and three starts.

On January 4, 2015, Wilber played in his first career playoff games and made two combined tackles, a pass deflection, and intercepted a pass by Matthew Stafford as the Cowboys defeated the Detroit Lions 24–20.

==== 2015 ====
The Dallas Cowboys entered the regular season with an entirely different linebacker core after experiencing the departures of Justin Durant, Bruce Carter, and the suspension of Rolando McClain. Anthony Hitchens was named starting middle linebacker after emerging at the end of the 2014 season, Sean Lee was moved to weakside linebacker, and Wilber was named starting strongside linebacker, coming off the field in obvious passing situations.

He started the Dallas Cowboys' season-opener against the New York Giants and collected three solo tackles during a 27–26 victory. In Week 2, he made one assisted tackle and returned a blocked punt for a touchdown in the Cowboys' 20–10 win at the Philadelphia Eagles. Wilber was demoted to a reserve role behind Anthony Hitchens after Rolando McClain returned from his four-game suspension. On September 27, Wilber made season-high five combined tackles during the Cowboys' 39-28 loss to the Atlanta Falcons. He finished the season with 27 combined tackles (16 solo), four quarterback pressures, and two pass deflections in 16 games and six starts. On special teams, he tied for the team lead in tackles (9) with Jeff Heath and Damien Wilson.

==== 2016 ====
On March 11, the Dallas Cowboys signed Wilber to a two-year, $3.25 million contract that includes a signing bonus of $1 million.

He entered training camp competing against Justin Durant, Anthony Hitchens, Andrew Gachkar, Damien Wilson, and Mark Nzeocha for the starting strongside linebacker. He suffered a setback after sustaining a back injury during camp. Head coach Jason Garrett named Wilber the starting strong linebacker.

On September 25, he made a season-high two combined tackles in the Cowboys' 31–17 victory over the Chicago Bears. In Week 5, he earned his only start of the season before suffering a neck injury during the Cowboys' 28–14 victory over the Cincinnati Bengals. He missed the following game at the Green Bay Packers due to the injury. His received minimal playing time on defense after being surpassed on the depth chart by Wilson in the seventh game against the Philadelphia Eagles. On December 1, Wilber made a season-high two solo tackles and caused a critical forced fumble and recovery that helped the Cowboys' regain the lead in their 17–15 win at the Minnesota Vikings. During a Week 16 matchup against the Detroit Lions, Wilber made one tackle and recovered a fumble during a 42–21 victory. He recovered the fumble and was tackled by Zach Zenner after David Irving made a strip/sack on Matt Stafford in the fourth quarter.

The Cowboys finished first in the NFC East with a 13–3 record and received a first round by in the playoffs. On January 15, 2017, he recorded one tackle in a 34–31 loss at the Green Bay Packers in the NFC Divisional round. Wilber spent the season playing mainly on special teams and finished with 5 defensive tackles, one forced fumble, 2 fumble recoveries and 8 special teams tackles (second on the team) in 15 games and one start.

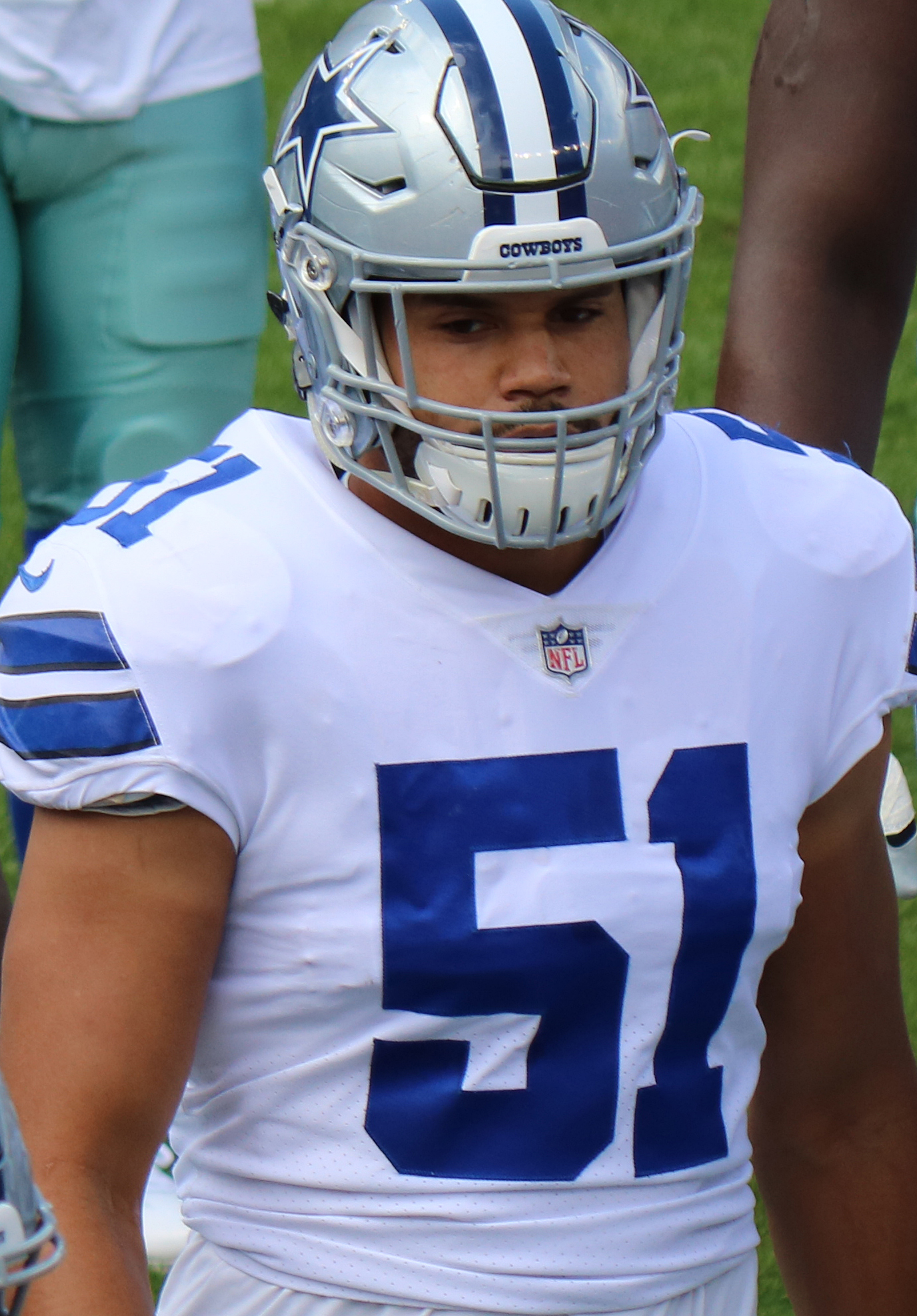
With the Cowboys in 2017

==== 2017 ====
Wilber he began the season as the starter in the base defense at strongside linebacker, before being passed on the depth chart by Damien Wilson in the seventh game against the Philadelphia Eagles. On September 17, he recorded a season-high two solo tackles in the Cowboys' 42–17 loss at the Denver Broncos. He appeared in a reserve role on defense and was a key player on special teams. He finished the season with 4 defensive tackles and 10 special teams tackles (tied for second on the team).

=== Oakland / Las Vegas Raiders ===
On March 17, 2018, the Oakland Raiders signed Wilber to a two-year, $2.75 million contract that includes $1.40 million guaranteed. He reunited with Rich Bisaccia who was his special teams coach with the Cowboys. He appeared in 14 games, making 8 defensive tackles and 8 special teams tackles. He was declared inactive in 2 games.

In 2019, he was a core special teams player. He had one special teams tackle and 2 passes defensed in the ninth game against the Los Angeles Chargers. He started at linebacker in the season finale against the Denver Broncos, making one tackle on special teams. He appeared in 14 games with one start, focusing on special teams, while making 3 defensive tackles, 2 passes defensed and 4 special teams tackles. He was declared inactive in 2 games.

On March 25, 2020, Wilber re-signed with the Raiders. He was released during final roster cuts on September 5, but re-signed with the team two days later. He appeared in 16 games.

On December 29, 2021, Wilber was signed by the Las Vegas Raiders.

== NFL career statistics ==
Legend
**Bold**	Career high

=== Regular season ===
Year	Team	Games		Tackles					Interceptions					Fumbles			
Year	Team	GP	GS	Cmb	Solo	Ast	Sck	TFL	Int	Yds	TD	Lng	PD	FF	FR	Yds	TD
2012	DAL	10	0	5	4	1	0.0	0	0	0	0	0	0	0	0	0	0
2013	DAL	**16**	**6**	**44**	**31**	**13**	**2.0**	**4**	0	0	0	0	0	**1**	**2**	**1**	0
2014	DAL	**16**	3	27	16	11	1.5	1	0	0	0	0	**2**	0	1	0	0
2015	DAL	**16**	**6**	25	16	9	0.0	1	0	0	0	0	0	0	0	0	0
2016	DAL	15	1	9	7	2	0.0	0	0	0	0	0	0	**1**	**2**	0	0
2017	DAL	**16**	0	10	8	2	0.0	0	0	0	0	0	0	**1**	0	0	0
2018	OAK	14	0	15	10	5	0.0	0	0	0	0	0	0	0	0	0	0
2019	OAK	14	1	6	5	1	0.0	0	0	0	0	0	**2**	0	0	0	0
2020	LVR	**16**	0	12	7	5	0.0	0	0	0	0	0	0	0	1	0	0
2021	LVR	2	0	0	0	0	0.0	0	0	0	0	0	0	0	0	0	0
Total		135	17	153	104	49	3.5	6	0	0	0	0	4	3	6	1	0

=== Playoffs ===
Year	Team	Games		Tackles					Interceptions					Fumbles			
Year	Team	GP	GS	Cmb	Solo	Ast	Sck	TFL	Int	Yds	TD	Lng	PD	FF	FR	Yds	TD
2014	DAL	**2**	0	**2**	1	**1**	0.0	0	**1**	**5**	0	**5**	**1**	0	0	0	0
2016	DAL	1	0	1	1	0	0.0	0	0	0	0	0	0	0	0	0	0
2021	LVR	1	0	**2**	**2**	0	0.0	0	0	0	0	0	0	0	0	0	0
Total		4	0	5	4	1	0.0	0	1	5	0	5	1	0	0	0	0

== Coaching career ==
=== Green Bay Packers ===
On March 10, 2023, Wilber was hired by the Green Bay Packers as their special teams quality control coach.

=== New Orleans Saints ===
On February 24, 2025, the New Orleans Saints hired Wilber to serve as their assistant special teams coach.
