= Anthony Hitchens =

American football player (born 1992)

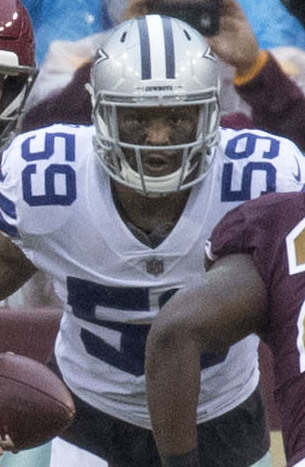
- Hitchens with the Dallas Cowboys in 2017

No. 59, 53
- Position: Linebacker

Personal information
- Born: June 10, 1992 (age 34); Lorain, Ohio, U.S.
- Listed height: 6 ft 0 in (1.83 m)
- Listed weight: 235 lb (107 kg)

Career information
- High school: Clearview (Lorain)
- College: Iowa
- NFL draft: 2014: 4th round, 119th overall pick

Career history
- Dallas Cowboys (2014–2017); Kansas City Chiefs (2018–2021)

Awards and highlights
- Super Bowl champion (LIV); Second-team All-Big Ten (2013)

Career NFL statistics
- Total tackles: 685
- Sacks: 5.5
- Forced fumbles: 4
- Interceptions: 2
- Stats at Pro Football Reference

Anthony Hitchens (born June 10, 1992) is an American former professional football player who was a linebacker in the National Football League (NFL). He played college football for the Iowa Hawkeyes and was selected by the Dallas Cowboys in the fourth round of the 2014 NFL draft.

== Early life ==
Hitchens was raised by his mother, Norma Hitchens, in Lorain, Ohio, where he attended Clearview High School. He has six siblings and does not have a relationship with his father who was in and out of prison. At the age of 12, Hitchens asked his mother if he could move in with his best friend, Zach Anderson, and his family in Sheffield Township. His mother gave him her permission and he immediately moved into Brad and Amy Anderson's home. Brad attended high school with Norma and Amy worked at a nonprofit organization in the community with her. Anthony played football with their oldest son Zach and would stay overnight and always eat dinner with them. Amy Anderson said there was no discussion about letting him move in because they both cared for him. With two sons of their own and another friend, James Washington, living there, the Andersons added an additional room so the boys would no longer have to share one room among the four of them.

In high school, Hitchens was a three-sport athlete, playing football, basketball, and track. On the football field he was also known for being an explosive running back. He is the school's all-time rushing leader with 3,864 yards, and the single game leader with 354 yards.

Hitchens was labeled a two-star recruit by Rivals.com. He had offers from the University of Kansas, Indiana University, University of Akron, and Eastern Michigan, before deciding to continue his career at the University of Iowa.

== College career ==
At Iowa, Hitchens was a four-year letter winner. In his first two years, he stayed mainly on special teams, before starting at linebacker as a junior and senior. In his career at Iowa he racked up 270 total tackles, including 124 as a junior which led the Big Ten Conference.

== Professional career ==
=== Pre-draft ===
Hitchens was one of 35 linebackers to perform at the NFL Combine in Indianapolis. Although he performed all of the combine drills, his day was considered mediocre. He tied for 12th among his position group in the 40-yard dash, tied for ninth among linebackers in the bench press, and finished 17th in the three-cone drill. On March 24, 2014, Hitchens opted to participate at Iowa's pro day, along with C. J. Fiedorowicz, Christian Kirksey, James Morris, and nine other prospects. He improved upon his 40-yard dash (4.65), 20-yard dash (2.72), and ran positional drills for the scouts and team representatives from 28 NFL teams. At the conclusion of the pre-draft process, Hitchens was projected to be a seventh round pick or priority undrafted free agent by the majority of NFL draft experts and scouts. He was ranked the 31st best outside linebacker prospect in the draft by DraftScout.com.

External videos
- Anthony Hitchens' NFL Combine Workout

Pre-draft measurables
Height	Weight	Arm length	Hand span	40-yard dash	10-yard split	20-yard split	20-yard shuttle	Three-cone drill	Vertical jump	Broad jump	Bench press
6 ft 0 3/8 in (1.84 m)	240 lb (109 kg)	32 1/2 in (0.83 m)	9 1/4 in (0.23 m)	4.74 s	1.62 s	2.74 s	4.45 s	7.15 s	35 1/2 in (0.90 m)	9 ft 8 in (2.95 m)	23 reps
All values from NFL Combine except vertical jump

=== Dallas Cowboys ===
==== 2014 ====
The Dallas Cowboys selected Hitchens in the fourth round with the 119th overall pick of the 2014 NFL draft. The Cowboys were heavily criticized regarding his selection, due to many evaluators projecting him to be a seventh round pick or go undrafted. Cowboys' owner Jerry Jones explained that they chose him to provide depth behind Sean Lee after experiencing the loss of Lee the year prior. Jones also stated they planned on selecting Hitchens in the fourth round ahead of time and his speed, athleticism, and tackling ability were key factors. On June 1, 2014, the Cowboys signed Hitchens to a four-year, $2.65 million contract that includes a signing bonus of $434,864.

External videos
- Rookie of the Week: Hitchens pulls weight in win
- Anthony Hitchens' Week 16 Highlights

When Lee was lost for the season during organized team activities, and the team traded for Rolando McClain, it was decided to make Hitchens learn all three linebacker positions. He began organized team activities taking reps with the first-team defense, but was soon moved to the backup middle linebacker after Justin Durant returned from a hamstring injury. He spent the bulk of training camp at outside linebacker, competing with Justin Durant and Kyle Wilber, before being moved back to middle linebacker. The Dallas Cowboys opted to trade for McClain and have Hitchens compete with him in training camp. Head coach Jason Garrett named Hitchens the back up middle linebacker to McClain to begin the 2014 season.

He made his professional regular season debut in the Cowboys' season-opener against the San Francisco 49ers and assisted on one tackle in the 28–17 loss. He made his first career tackle in the closing seconds of the game, helping safety Barry Church tackle 49ers' running back Frank Gore who gained five-yards on a short run to seal the win for the 49ers. The following week, Hitchens earned his first career start at weakside linebacker and recorded two combined tackles during a 26–10 victory at the Tennessee Titans. He started in place of Justin Durant, who suffered a groin injury in the season-opener against the 49ers. During a Week 3 matchup at the St. Louis Rams, Hitchens collected a season-high 13 combined tackles and deflected a pass in Dallas' 34–31 victory. He also recorded five combined tackles on special teams. Head coach Jason Garrett named Hitchens the weakside linebacker for the remainder of the season after Justin Durant was placed on injured/reserve after tearing his biceps in the Cowboys' 20–17 overtime loss to the Washington Redskins on Monday Night Football. On December 21, 2014, Hitchens made eight solo tackles, defended two passes, and has his first career interception after picking off a pass attempt by Indianapolis Colts quarterback Matt Hasselbeck during the Cowboys' 42–7 victory. He was nominated for the Pepsi Rookie of the Week award after his week 16 performance against the Colts. He finished the regular season with 75 combined tackles (59 solo), four pass deflections, and one interception in 16 games and nine starts.

The Dallas Cowboys finished atop the NFC East with a 12–4 record. On January 4, 2015, Hitchens played in his first career playoff game and recorded three combined tackles and deflected a pass, as the Cowboys defeated the Detroit Lions 24–20 in the wildcard playoff game against the Detroit Lions. Hitchens was involved in a heavily controversial play during the fourth quarter after the back judge threw a flag and penalized Hitchens for pass interference for making contact and pushing off of Lions' tight end Brandon Pettigrew as he attempted to catch a deep pass by Matt Stafford. The line judge ultimately chose to overturn the penalty and the flag was disregarded without an immediate explanation on the field. After the game, referee Pete Morelli stated that the line judge determined there was not enough contact to warrant a penalty. The next game, he collected six combined tackles during a 26–21 loss at the Green Bay Packers in the NFC Divisional Round.

==== 2015 ====
Hitchens was slated to become the strong side linebacker after the departure of Bruce Carter, but was switched to middle linebacker after McClain was suspended for the first four games. He was named the starting middle linebacker, ahead of Jasper Brinkley, to begin the regular season.

In Week 2, Hitchens recorded five combined tackles and made his first career sack on Philadelphia Eagles quarterback Sam Bradford during a 20–10 victory. On October 4, 2015, he recorded a season-high 11 combined tackles and sacked Drew Brees in Dallas' 26–20 loss at the New Orleans Saints. On December 19, 2015, Hitchens started at middle linebacker in place of McClain who suffered an injury and collected ten combined tackles during a 19–16 loss to the New York Jets. He finished the 2015 season with a total of 67 combined tackles (40 solo), two sacks, and a defended pass in 16 games and nine starts as the Cowboys finished 4–12. His production was slightly decreased due to the return of Lee.

==== 2016 ====
Hitchens began training camp competing with Kyle Wilber and Damien Wilson for the role as the strongside linebacker. He took over the role as the Cowboys' starting middle linebacker after McClain was dealt a ten-game suspension after violating the performance-enhancing drugs policy.

He started the Cowboys' season-opener at the New York Giants and collected six combined tackles in their 20–19 loss. On December 1, 2016, Hitchens recorded a season-high ten combined tackles, deflected a pass, and sacked Minnesota Vikings quarterback Sam Bradford, as the Cowboys won 17–15. He finished the season with 78 combined tackles (39 solo), 1.5 sacks, and a pass deflection in 16 games and 16 starts. The Dallas Cowboys received a playoff berth after finishing atop the NFC East with a 13–3 record. On January 15, 2017, Hitchens started his first career playoff game and collected seven combined tackles in a 34–31 loss at the Packers in the NFC Divisional Round.

==== 2017 ====
He received a considerable raise for the 2017 season after playing over 35% of the Dallas Cowboys' defensive snaps. His salary went from $690,000 to $1.84 million after qualifying for the Proven Performance Escalator. The Proven Performance Escalator was added to the rookie wage scale as a part of the collective bargaining agreement in 2011 and applies to players who were drafted in the third to seventh round.

Throughout training camp in 2017, Hitchens competed with Jaylon Smith to maintain his role as the starting middle linebacker. Hitchens was slated to start the season at middle linebacker, but suffered a tibial plateau fracture in the Cowboys' final preseason game against the Oakland Raiders. He was expected to miss up to eight weeks, but was able to return before Week 5. On November 12, 2017, Hitchens recorded ten combined tackles in a 27–7 loss to the Atlanta Falcons. The following week, he moved over to weakside linebacker after Lee suffered a hamstring injury. Hitchens went on to collect five combined tackles before suffering a groin injury, in the Cowboys 37–9 loss to the Eagles. On November 30, 2017, Hitchens recorded a season-high 15 combined tackles in Dallas' 34–15 victory over the Redskins. Hitchens finished the season with 84 combined tackles (55 solo), two pass deflections, and one forced fumble in 12 games and 12 starts.

Hitchens became an unrestricted free agent in 2018 and was considered one of the top free agent linebackers available. He was heavily linked to the Colts due to his experience under defensive coordinator Matt Eberflus who was his linebacker coach with the Dallas Cowboys. The Dallas Cowboys were interested in re-signing Hitchens, but were unable to offer a considerable contract.

=== Kansas City Chiefs ===
==== 2018 ====
On March 15, 2018, the Kansas City Chiefs signed Hitchens to a five-year, $45 million contract that includes $25.09 million and a signing bonus of $14 million. Hitchens entered training camp slated as a starting inside linebacker and replaced Derrick Johnson. Head coach Andy Reid named Hitchens and Reggie Ragland the starting inside linebackers to begin the regular season. They began the season alongside outside linebackers Dee Ford and Justin Houston.

External videos
- Anthony Hitchens stops Yeldon in tracks for a loss

He started in the Chiefs season-opener at the Los Angeles Chargers and collected a season-high 14 combined tackles (six solo) during a 38–28 victory. In Week 6, he tied his season-high of 14 combined tackles (six solo) as the Chiefs lost 43–40 at the New England Patriots. In Week 8, Hitchens sustained a rib injury during the fourth quarter of a 30–23 victory against the Denver Broncos. The following week, he aggravated his rib injury and was subsequently sidelined for the Chiefs' Week 10 victory against the Arizona Cardinals. Hitchens finished the 2018 NFL season with a career-high 135 combined tackles (81 solo) and forced one fumble in 15 games and 15 starts. His 135 tackles led the Kansas City Chiefs' defense and finished fifth among all players in 2018. He received an overall grade of 40.6 from Pro Football Focus, which ranked 92nd among all linebackers in 2018.

==== 2019 ====
In Week 7 against the Broncos, Hitchens recorded a team high 6 tackles and sacked Joe Flacco twice in the 30–6 win. One of his sacks resulted in a forced fumble which teammate Reggie Ragland returned for a touchdown. Hitchens helped the Chiefs reach Super Bowl LIV where they defeated the 49ers 31–20. Hitchens recorded four combined tackles in the Super Bowl.

==== 2020 ====
Hitchens was placed on the reserve/COVID-19 list by the Chiefs on December 22, 2020, and activated on January 11, 2021. Hitchens helped the Chiefs reach Super Bowl LV, but lost 31–9 to the Tampa Bay Buccaneers. Hitchens recorded 1 tackle in the loss.

==== 2021 ====
Hitchens entered the 2021 season as the starting middle linebacker. He started 15 games, finishing second on the team with 80 tackles. He was released on February 22, 2022.

== NFL career statistics ==
Year	Team	Games		Tackles				Fumbles				Interceptions					
Year	Team	GP	GS	Cmb	Solo	Ast	Sck	FF	FR	Yds	TD	Int	Yds	Avg	Lng	TD	PD
2014	DAL	16	11	75	59	16	0.0	0	0	0	0	1	8	8.0	8	0	4
2015	DAL	16	9	67	40	27	2.0	1	0	0	0	0	0	0.0	0	0	1
2016	DAL	16	16	78	39	39	1.5	0	0	0	0	0	0	0.0	0	0	1
2017	DAL	12	12	84	55	29	0.0	1	0	0	0	0	0	0.0	0	0	2
2018	KC	15	15	135	81	54	0.0	1	0	0	0	0	0	0.0	0	0	0
2019	KC	15	15	88	51	37	2.0	1	0	0	0	0	0	0.0	0	0	1
2020	KC	14	14	78	44	34	0.0	0	0	0	0	0	0	0.0	0	0	1
2021	KC	15	15	80	41	39	0.0	0	0	0	0	1	0	0.0	0	0	2
Career		119	107	605	369	236	5.5	4	0	0	0	1	8	8.0	8	0	10
