= Jeff Heath (American football) =

American football player (born 1991)

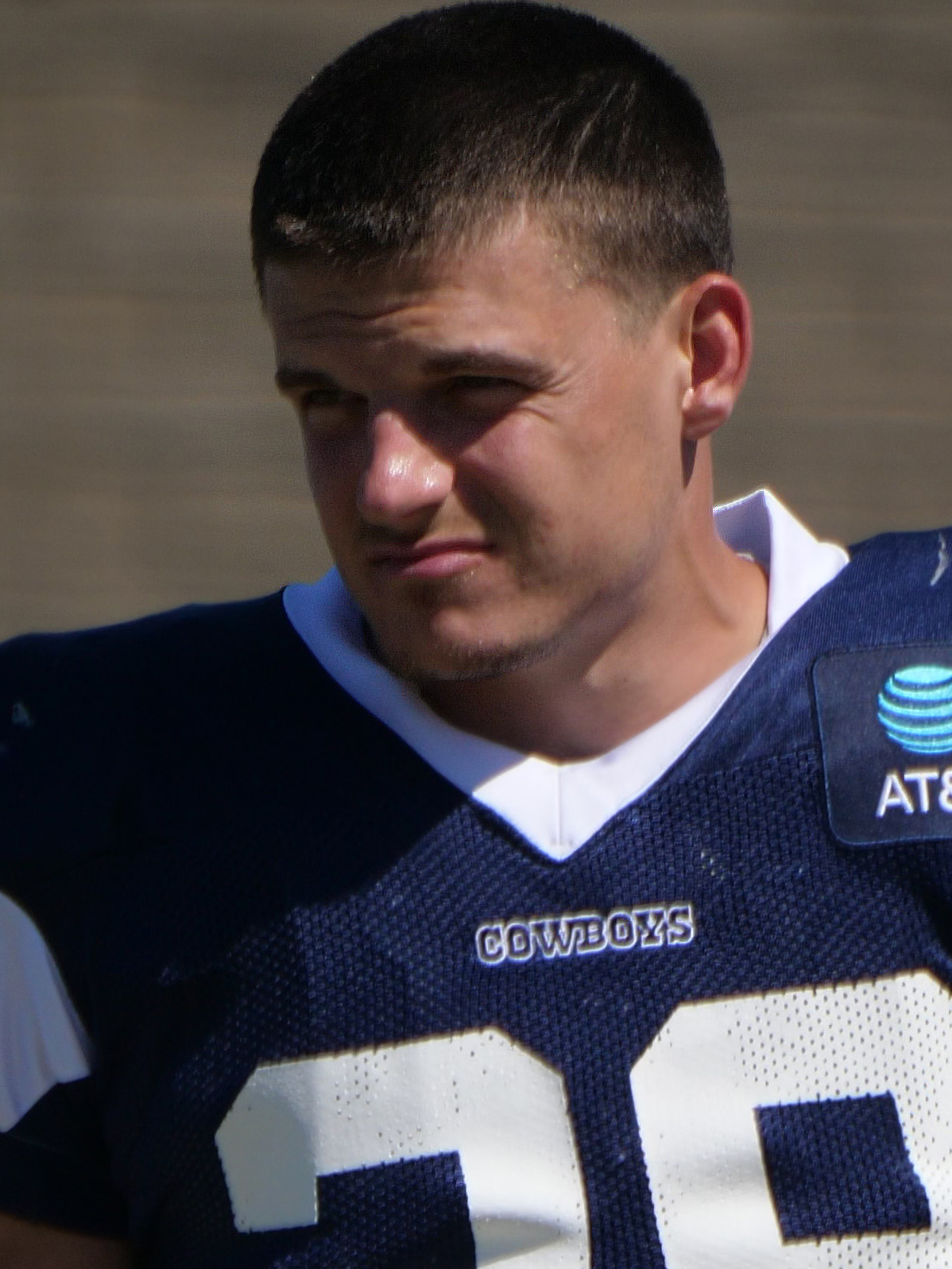
- Heath with the Dallas Cowboys in 2019

No. 38
- Position: Safety

Personal information
- Born: May 14, 1991 (age 35); Lake Orion, Michigan, U.S.
- Listed height: 6 ft 1 in (1.85 m)
- Listed weight: 212 lb (96 kg)

Career information
- High school: Lake Orion
- College: Saginaw Valley State (2009–2012)
- NFL draft: 2013: undrafted

Career history
- Dallas Cowboys (2013–2019); Las Vegas Raiders (2020); New Orleans Saints (2021)

Awards and highlights
- Second-team All-GLIAC (2012)

Career NFL statistics
- Total tackles: 395
- Forced fumbles: 5
- Fumble recoveries: 1
- Pass deflections: 28
- Interceptions: 11
- Defensive touchdowns: 1
- Stats at Pro Football Reference

Jeff Heath (born May 14, 1991) is an American former professional football player who was a safety in the National Football League (NFL). He played college football for the Saginaw Valley State Cardinals. Heath signed with the Dallas Cowboys as an undrafted free agent in 2013. He also played for the Las Vegas Raiders and New Orleans Saints.

== Early life ==
Heath attended Lake Orion High School where he practiced football and soccer. He was selected as the Big Play Player of the Year for kicking a game-winning 49 yard field goal to give Lake Orion a playoff victory and regional title over Sterling Heights Stevenson. The team advanced to the Michigan Division 1 state championship game in 2008 before falling to Rockford High School.

As a senior, he started as a defensive back, wide out, kicker and punter, voted team captain and received All-North conference honors.

== College career ==
Heath accepted a football scholarship from Saginaw Valley State University, an NCAA Division II program and a member of the Great Lakes Intercollegiate Athletic Conference. He was not heavily recruited out of high school, and was only offered a partial scholarship with SVSU. As a freshman, he appeared in 5 games (one start), tallying 13 tackles (4 solo), one interception, one tackle for a loss, one forced fumble, one fumble recovery and one pass defensed.

As a sophomore, he appeared in 8 games (7 starts), tallying 49 tackles (3.5 for loss), one interception and 2 fumble recoveries. As a junior, he started all 11 games, registering 81 tackles (9 for loss), one sack, 3 passes defended, one interception, one forced fumble and one fumble recovery.

As a senior, he started all games, recording 77 tackles (3 for loss), 5 interceptions, 7 passes defended, one forced fumble and 2 fumble recoveries. He finished his college career after starting 30-of-35 games, posting 219 tackles (16.5 for loss), 7 interceptions, 4 forced fumbles and 4 fumble recoveries.

Heath majored in criminal science at Saginaw Valley State.

== Professional career ==
=== Pre-draft ===
Heath didn't receive an invitation to perform at the NFL Combine in Indianapolis. On March 11, 2013, Heath participated at the Great Lakes Intercollegiate Athletic Conference's pro day. Team representatives and scouts from a few teams attended Heath's pro day, including the Dallas Cowboys. At the conclusion of the pre-draft process, Heath was projected to be a seventh round pick or priority undrafted free agent by NFL draft experts. He was ranked as the 27th best strong safety prospect in the draft by DraftScout.com.

Pre-draft measurables
Height	Weight	Arm length	Hand span	Wingspan	40-yard dash	10-yard split	20-yard split	20-yard shuttle	Three-cone drill	Vertical jump	Broad jump	Bench press
6 ft 1 1/8 in (1.86 m)	209 lb (95 kg)	30 3/8 in (0.77 m)	8 7/8 in (0.23 m)	6 ft 2 1/4 in (1.89 m)	4.48 s	1.59 s	2.70 s	4.36 s	6.88 s	37.0 in (0.94 m)	10 ft 6 in (3.20 m)	22 reps
All values from GLIAC's Pro Day

=== Dallas Cowboys ===
==== 2013 season ====
On April 27, 2013, the Cowboys signed Heath to a three-year, $1.48 million contract with a signing bonus of $2,000 after he went undrafted in the 2013 NFL draft. The Cowboys were the first team to call Heath and extend a contract offer.

External videos
- Jeff Heath forces fumble by Cobi Hamilton

Throughout training camp, Heath competed for a roster spot as a backup safety and special teams player against Brandon Underwood, Matt Johnson, Micah Pellerin, Jakar Hamilton, and Eric Frampton. He impressed coaches with his preseason performance and made a total of 16 combined tackles (11 solo) and a forced fumble in five preseason games. Heath made the active roster as the fifth safety on the Cowboys' depth chart and special teams player after Johnson was placed on injured reserve due to a foot injury. Head coach Jason Garrett named Heath a backup free safety to start the regular season, behind Barry Church and Danny McCray.

He made his professional regular season debut in the Cowboys' season-opener against the New York Giants and assisted on one tackle during their 36–31 victory. On October 27, 2013, Heath earned his first career start after J. J. Wilcox was inactive and missed three games (8-10) due to a knee injury. Heath finished the Cowboys' 31–30 loss at the Detroit Lions with a season-high nine combined tackles and a forced fumble, but was also part of a highlight reel reception, when he lost a jump ball to Calvin Johnson. The next two games proved to be difficult, with Minnesota Vikings running back Adrian Peterson running over him for a touchdown and being beaten for 3 touchdowns while playing against the New Orleans Saints.

In Week 12, although Wilcox returned from injury, Heath remained the starter, making six combined tackles and returned a fumble recovery for his first career touchdown in the Cowboys' 24–21 win at the Giants. Heath recovered a fumble by wide receiver Victor Cruz and returned it for a 50-yard touchdown after it was stripped by teammate Orlando Scandrick during the second quarter. On December 22, 2013, he recorded five combined tackles, deflected a pass, and made his first career interception during a 24–23 victory at the Washington Redskins in Week 16. Heath made his first career interception off a pass by Redskins' quarterback Kirk Cousins, that was originally intended for wide receiver Santana Moss, in the second quarter.

He finished his rookie season in 2013 with 60 combined tackles (47 solo), three pass deflections, an interception, a fumble recovery, a touchdown and 13 special teams tackles (led the team) in 16 games with nine starts. Heath also led the Cowboys with 13 combined tackles on special teams. Heath's rookie season was largely seen as a disappointment due to issues he had in pass coverage. He was repeatedly targeted and gave up multiple receptions during the 2013 season.

==== 2014 season ====
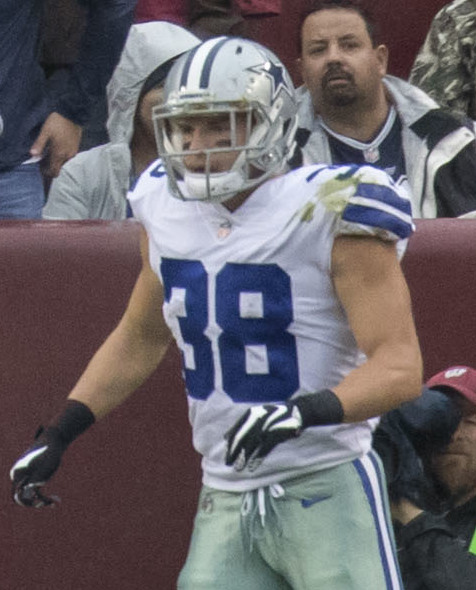
Heath in 2017

On January 28, 2014, the Cowboys promoted defensive line coach Rod Marinelli to defensive coordinator after they opted to transition former defensive coordinator Monte Kiffin to assistant head coach/defense. They chose to make the change after the Cowboys finished last in the league in defense and allowed the most yards in franchise history. Heath competed against J.J. Wilcox, Matt Johnson, and Jakar Hamilton for the job as the starting free safety during training camp. Garrett named Heath the backup strong safety, behind J.J. Wilcox, to start the regular season.

In Week 7, Heath collected a season-high five combined tackles in the Cowboys' 31–21 win against the Giants. On November 23, 2014, Heath made three solo tackles before fracturing his thumb during a 31–21 victory at the New York Giants. He was sidelined for the next two games (Weeks 13–14) due to his thumb injury. Heath finished the 2014 season with 16 combined tackles (10 solo) and 8 special teams tackles (fourth on the team) in 14 games with zero starts.

The Cowboys finished first in the National Football Conference (NFC) East with a 12–4 record, earning a playoff berth. On January 4, 2015, Heath appeared in his first career playoff game and made two solo tackles during a 24–20 victory against the Lions in NFC Wildcard Game. The following week, he recorded seven solo tackles and deflected a pass attempt during a two-point conversion after replacing Barry Church in the second half of the Cowboys' 26–21 loss at the Green Bay Packers in the NFC Divisional Round.

==== 2015 season ====
Garrett named Heath the backup free safety to start the regular season in 2015, behind starter J. J. Wilcox. On November 1, 2015, Heath was involved in a violent collision with Seahawks' wide receiver Ricardo Lockette during the second quarter of a 13–12 loss to the Seattle Seahawks in Week 8. The incident happened while Heath was on punt coverage and Lockette a gunner and running downfield as Heath delivered a block to Lockette who was unaware of the impending blow. Lockette was immediately rendered unconscious and was carted off the field and transported to the hospital. Heath received a 15-yard penalty for unnecessary roughness and Lockette was diagnosed with a severe concussion and underwent surgery to stabilize ligaments in his neck. The collision and injury effectively ended Lockette's career and forced him into retirement. In Week 9, he collected a season-high six combined tackles during a 33–27 loss to the Philadelphia Eagles.

On November 15, 2015, Heath recorded two solo tackles, two pass deflections, and two interceptions in the Cowboys' 10–6 loss at the Tampa Bay Buccaneers in Week 10. Heath made his first interception of his career off a pass by quarterback Jameis Winston, that was originally intended for tight end Brandon Myers, in the second quarter. He finished the 2015 season with 25 combined tackles (20 solo), two pass deflections, two interceptions, and a forced fumble in 16 games and one start. He primarily played on special teams during the season and tied teammates Kyle Wilber and Damien Wilson with nine special teams tackles.

==== 2016 season ====
During training camp, Heath competed to be a backup safety against J. J. Wilcox and Kavon Frazier. Garrett named Heath the backup safety behind Byron Jones to start the regular season in 2016. In Week 15, he recorded one tackle, deflected a pass, and made an interception during a 26–20 victory against Buccaneers in Week 15. On January 1, 2017, Heath collected a season-high four combined tackles in the Cowboys' 27–13 loss at the Eagles.

He finished the 2016 season with 20 combined tackles (14 solo), two pass deflections, an interception and 7 special teams tackles (third on the team) in 16 games with no starts. He tied for the team lead in special teams tackles with seven, along with Byron Jones and Kyle Wilber. Pro Football Focus gave Heath an overall grade of 76.4.

The Cowboys finished first in the NFC East with a 13–3 record and earned a first round bye. On January 15, 2017, he had one of his best games in the 34–31 loss against the Packers in the NFC Divisional Round, recording three solo tackles, one deflected pass, one interception (a second one was called back because of a penalty), his first career sack, one quarterback hurry and one special teams tackle.

==== 2017 season ====
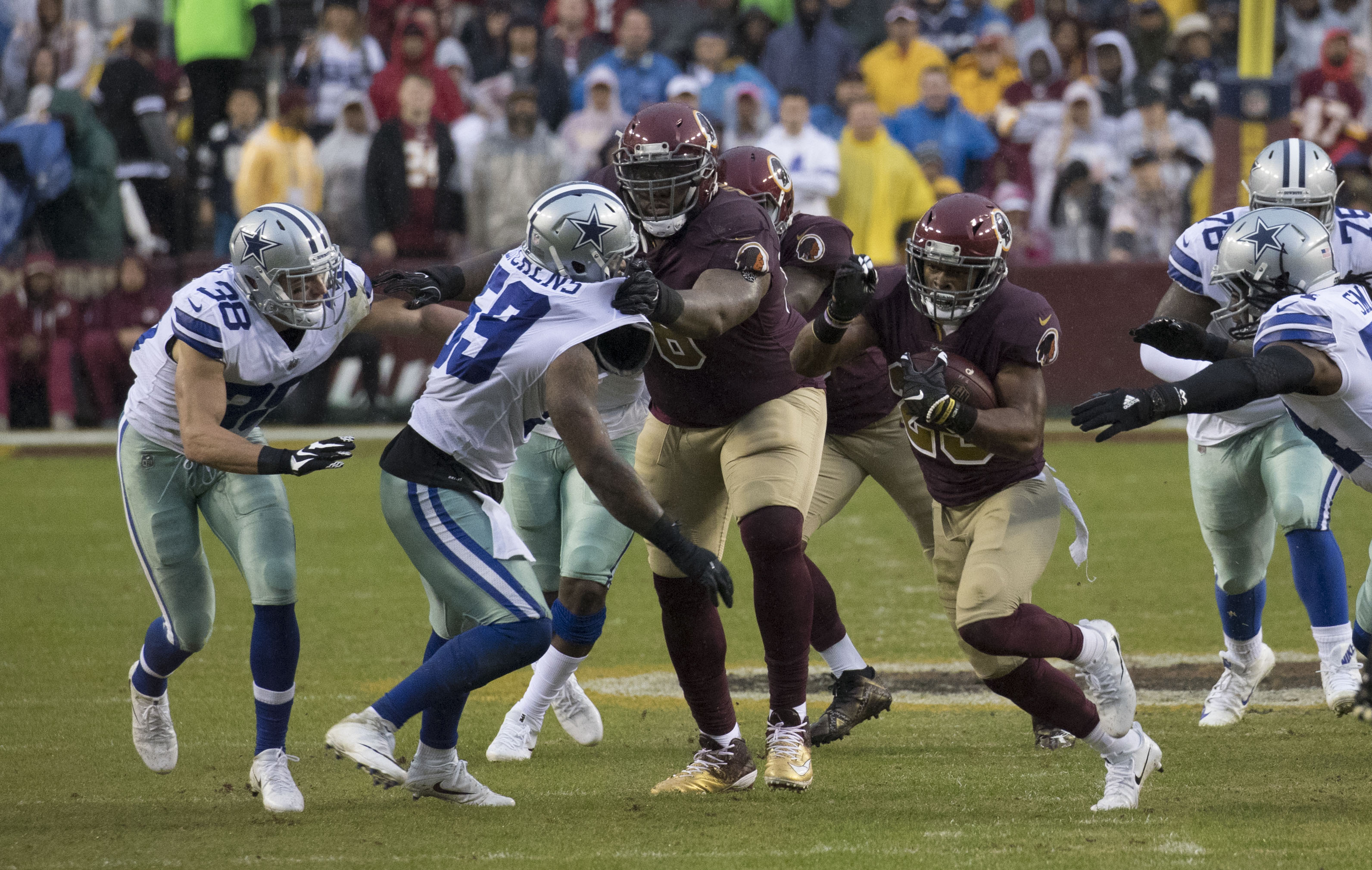
Heath (left) playing against the Washington Redskins in 2017.

Throughout training camp, Heath competed against Robert Blanton to be the starting strong safety. The role was left vacant after Barry Church and J. J. Wilcox departed during free agency. Garrett named Heath the starter, alongside free safety Byron Jones.

In Week 7, Heath filled in as the emergency kicker, following an injury to kicker Dan Bailey. He was tasked with kickoffs and extra points and converted two of three extra point attempts during the Cowboys' 40–10 victory at the San Francisco 49ers. This made him the first non-kicker or punter to make multiple extra points in game since Houston Oilers linebacker Ted Thompson went 4 out of 4 in 1980.

In a Week 9 victory over the Kansas City Chiefs, Heath intercepted quarterback Alex Smith for the first interception of Smith’s season.

Heath was inactive for the Cowboys' Week 11 loss to the Eagles due to a concussion. On November 30, 2017, Heath recorded four solo tackles, broke up a pass, and made an interception in a 38–14 win against the Redskins in Week 13.

The following week, Heath collected a career-high ten combined tackles (eight solo), deflected a pass, and intercepted a pass by quarterback Eli Manning during a 30–10 win at the Giants in Week 14.

Heath finished the 2017 season with 15 starts, 81 tackles (fourth on the team), five pass deflections, a career-high three interceptions, two forced fumbles and 8 special teams tackles (fifth on the team). Pro Football Focus gave him an overall grade of 80.8, which ranked 35th among all qualifying safeties in 2017.

==== 2018 season ====
Heath started all 16 contests for the first time in his career, registering a career-best 84 tackles (third-best on a top-10 defense), four tackles for losses (tied for third on the team), 6 pass breakups, one interception, one quarterback pressure and 9 special teams tackles (third on the team).

He made 9 tackles and one pass defensed in a 19-16 overtime loss to the Houston Texans in Week 5. He followed that big performance in the next game against the Jacksonville Jaguars with an interception returned 47 yards off of quarterback Blake Bortles. He had a team-best 9 tackles in the Divisional Playoff Game against the Los Angeles Rams.

==== 2019 season ====
Heath started 13 games, missing 3 with a shoulder injury that required offseason surgery. He posted 63 tackles (sixth on the team), 3 quarterback hurries, 9 passes defensed and did not have an interception for the second time in his career.

He had 9 tackles and 2 passes defensed in the season opener against the Giants. He made 7 tackles and 2 passes defensed in the season finale against the Redskins.

=== Las Vegas Raiders ===
On March 27, 2020, Heath signed a two-year, $8 million contract with the Las Vegas Raiders, reuniting with assistant coach Rod Marinelli, who was his defensive coordinator with the Cowboys. He was a backup safety behind Erik Harris and Johnathan Abram.

In Week 5 against the Chiefs, Heath recorded his first interception as a Raider off a pass thrown by Patrick Mahomes during the 40–32 win. In Week 10 against the Denver Broncos, Heath intercepted two passes thrown by Drew Lock during the 37–12 win, earning him the AFC Defensive Player of the Week award for his performance.

He was placed on injured reserve on December 12, 2020. While on injured reserve, Raiders defensive backs coach Jim O’Neil and assistant Taver Johnson were ruled out of a game against the Miami Dolphins due to COVID-19 protocols, and Heath was pressed into service as a defensive backs coach along with general manager Mike Mayock. Heath was activated from injured reserve on January 2, 2021. He finished with 34 tackles, 3 interceptions (led the team), 4 passes defensed and 3 special teams tackles in 13 games with 5 starts.

On May 5, 2021, he was released after the Raiders selected three safeties in the 2021 NFL draft.

=== New Orleans Saints ===
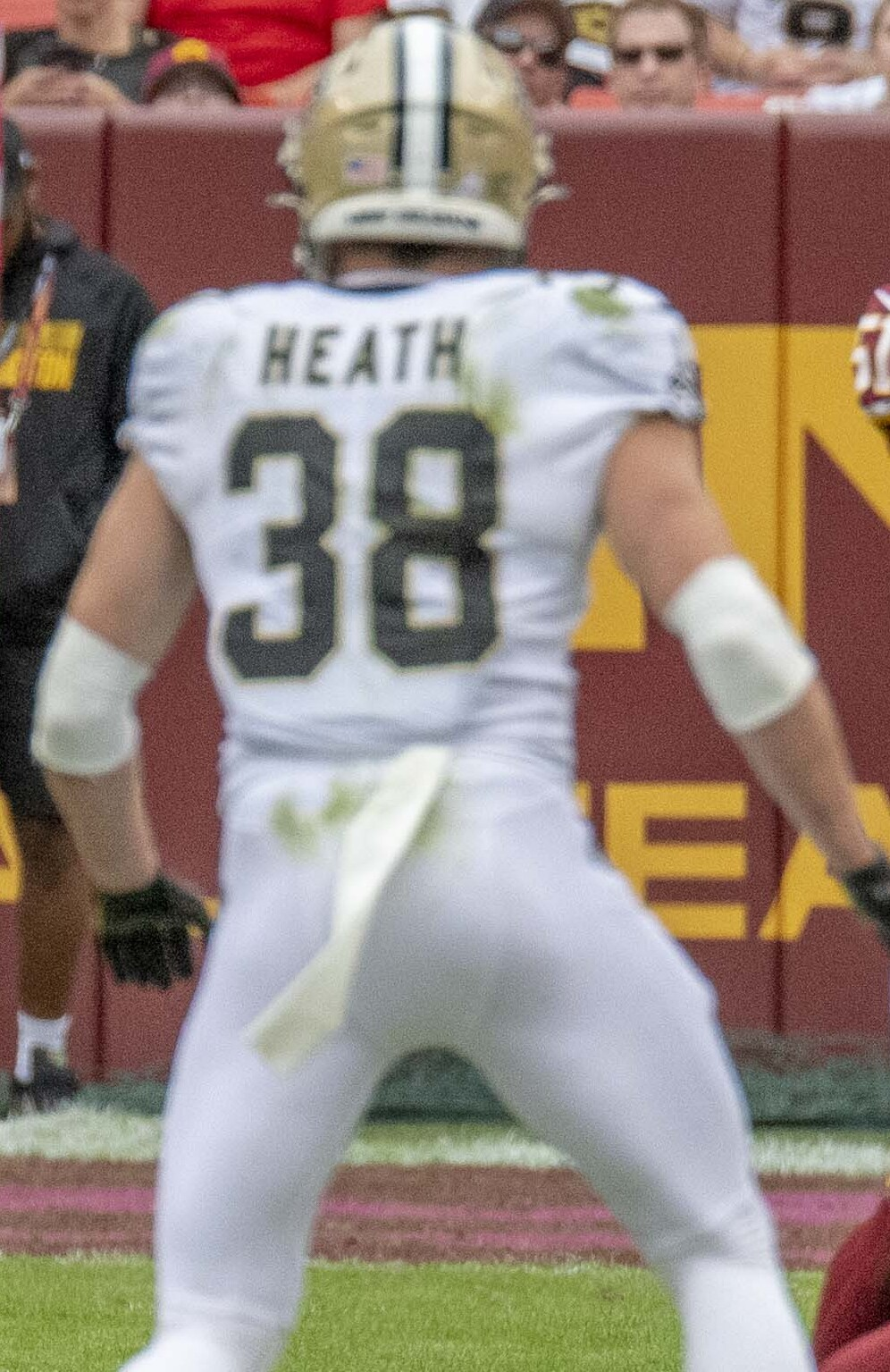
Heath with the Saints in 2021

On August 21, 2021, he signed as a free agent with the Saints. He was released on September 10, 2021, but re-signed to the practice squad the next day and was later signed to the active roster.

Heath appeared in 16 games, focusing mostly on special teams and only played on defense in four of them. He had 5 defensive tackles, one sack and 7 special teams tackles. He wasn't re-signed after the season.

=== NFL statistics ===
Legend
	Led the league
**Bold**	Career high

Regular season statistics
Year	Team	Games		Tackles				Interceptions						Fumbles			
Year	Team	GP	GS	Comb	Solo	Ast	Sack	PD	INT	Yds	Avg	Lng	TD	FF	FR	Yds	TD
2013	DAL	**16**	9	60	47	13	0.0	3	1	0	0.0	0	0	1	**1**	**50**	**1**
2014	DAL	14	0	27	26	1	0.0	0	0	0	0.0	0	0	0	0	0	0
2015	DAL	**16**	1	18	15	3	0.0	2	2	19	9.5	19	0	1	0	0	0
2016	DAL	**16**	0	17	13	4	0.0	2	1	19	19.0	19	0	0	0	0	0
2017	DAL	15	15	63	55	8	0.0	5	**3**	20	6.7	14	0	**2**	0	0	0
2018	DAL	**16**	**16**	**85**	**63**	**22**	0.0	5	1	49	**49.0**	**49**	0	1	0	0	0
2019	DAL	13	13	63	41	**22**	0.0	**7**	0	0	0.0	0	0	0	0	0	0
2020	LV	13	5	37	28	9	0.0	4	**3**	**89**	29.7	47	0	0	0	0	0
2021	NO	16	0	12	10	2	**1.0**	0	0	0	0.0	0	0	0	0	0	0
Total		135	59	395	305	90	1.0	28	11	196	17.8	49	0	5	1	50	1

Postseason statistics
Year	Team	Games		Tackles				Interceptions						Fumbles			
Year	Team	GP	GS	Comb	Solo	Ast	Sack	PD	INT	Yds	Avg	Lng	TD	FF	FR	Yds	TD
2014	DAL	**2**	0	9	**9**	0	0.0	0	0	0	0.0	0	0	0	0	0	0
2016	DAL	1	0	3	3	0	**1.0**	**1**	**1**	**27**	**27.0**	**27**	0	0	0	0	0
2018	DAL	**2**	**2**	**12**	7	**5**	0.0	**1**	0	0	0.0	0	0	0	0	0	0
Total		5	2	24	19	5	1.0	2	1	27	27.0	27	0	0	0	0	0

== Post NFL ==
Jeff Heath resides in Michigan with his wife, former Dallas Cowboy cheerleader Paige (Cavalieri) and their children. As of September 2025, he has joined the football coaching staff at Lake Orion High School.
