= Damien Wilson =

American football player (born 1993)

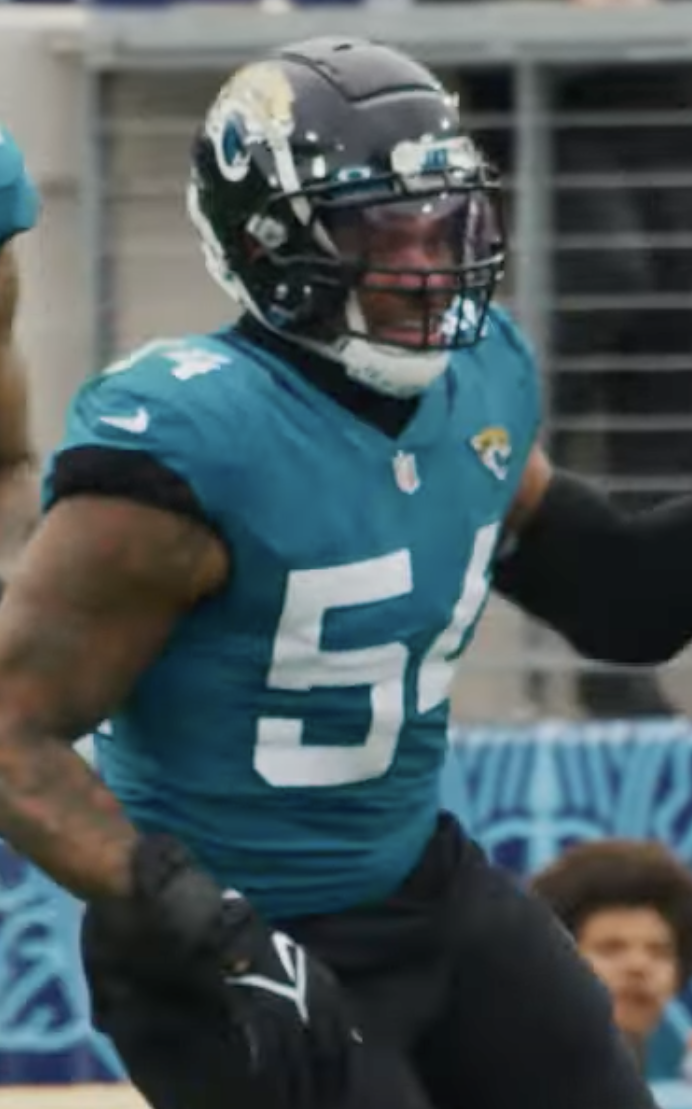
- Wilson with the Jacksonville Jaguars in 2021

Profile
- Position: Linebacker

Personal information
- Born: May 28, 1993 (age 33); Gloster, Mississippi, U.S.
- Listed height: 6 ft 0 in (1.83 m)
- Listed weight: 245 lb (111 kg)

Career information
- High school: Amite County (Liberty, Mississippi)
- College: Alcorn State (2011); Jones County JC (2012); Minnesota (2013–2014)
- NFL draft: 2015: 4th round, 127th overall pick

Career history
- Dallas Cowboys (2015–2018); Kansas City Chiefs (2019–2020); Jacksonville Jaguars (2021); Carolina Panthers (2022); Dallas Cowboys (2023–2024)*
- * Offseason or practice squad member only

Awards and highlights
- Super Bowl champion (LIV); First-team All-Big Ten (2014)

Career NFL statistics
- Total tackles: 419
- Sacks: 9
- Forced fumbles: 5
- Pass deflections: 9
- Interceptions: 1
- Stats at Pro Football Reference

Damien Wilson (born May 28, 1993) is an American professional football linebacker. He played college football for the Minnesota Golden Gophers and was selected by the Dallas Cowboys of the National Football League (NFL) in the fourth round of the 2015 NFL draft. He has also played for the Kansas City Chiefs, Jacksonville Jaguars, and Carolina Panthers.

== Early life ==
Wilson attended Amite County High School in Liberty, Mississippi, where he was a teammate of Gabe Jackson. He accepted a scholarship from Alcorn State University, but transferred to Jones County Junior College after his freshman season.

== College career ==
As a sophomore safety, Wilson was named the Region 23 Defensive MVP, after ranking fourth in the nation with 122 tackles (six for loss), two sacks and two passes defensed. As a sophomore, he registered 119 tackles (10.5 for loss). At the end of the year, he transferred to the University of Minnesota.

As a junior, he was converted to linebacker, finishing with 12 starts, 78 tackles (second on the team), one sack and 5.5 tackles-for-loss. In his last year he registered 12 starts, 119 tackles (led team), four sacks (tied for team lead), 10.5 tackles-for-loss (led the team), one interception, three passes defensed, one forced fumble and two fumble recoveries.

== Professional career ==
Pre-draft measurables
Height	Weight	Arm length	Hand span	40-yard dash	10-yard split	20-yard split	20-yard shuttle	Three-cone drill	Vertical jump	Broad jump	Bench press
6 ft 0 in (1.83 m)	245 lb (111 kg)	33 3/4 in (0.86 m)	9 3/8 in (0.24 m)	4.77 s	1.65 s	2.76 s	4.20 s	7.21 s	37 in (0.94 m)	9 ft 11 in (3.02 m)	22 reps
All values from NFL Combine

=== Dallas Cowboys (first stint) ===
The Dallas Cowboys selected Wilson in the fourth round with the 127th overall pick in the 2015 NFL draft. He was the 13th linebacker selected in 2015. On May 28, 2015, the Cowboys signed Wilson to a four-year, $2.74 million contract that includes a signing bonus of $466,315.

As Anthony Hitchens did before him, the coaches decided to make Wilson learn all three linebacker positions in training camp. On special teams he tied for the team lead in tackles (9) with Kyle Wilber and Jeff Heath. As a rookie he registered a total of 16 tackles. Against the New Orleans Saints, he saw extensive play and performed well replacing an injured Andrew Gachkar. He played the season mostly on special teams.

In 2016, he suffered a serious offseason injury on his right eye while playing paintball, missing the first two weeks of training camp after being placed on the non-football injury list. In week 6 of the season, he passed Kyle Wilber on the depth chart and went on to start 5 games at strongside linebacker. He posted 35 tackles (4 for loss).

In 2017, he began the season as the backup at strongside linebacker, before passing Wilber on the depth chart in the seventh game against the Philadelphia Eagles. He tallied 39 tackles (eleventh on the team), five quarterback hurries, one sack and seven special teams tackles (sixth on the team).

=== Kansas City Chiefs ===
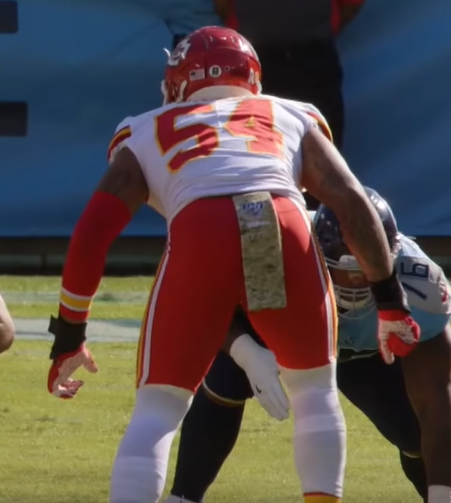
Wilson playing for the Chiefs in 2019

On March 14, 2019, Wilson signed a two-year, $5.75 million contract with the Kansas City Chiefs. He started all 16 games at middle linebacker, posting 81 tackles (3 for loss), 1.5 sacks and one forced fumble. He had 12 tackles against the Indianapolis Colts. He started all 3 playoff games while helping the Chiefs win their first Super Bowl in 50 years. The Chiefs defeated the San Francisco 49ers 31–20 in Super Bowl LIV.

In 2020, he started 13 games at middle linebacker, totaling 70 tackles (3 for loss), one forced fumble and 3 special teams tackles. He missed 3 games with a knee injury (the only games he has missed to injury in his career). He had 11 tackles (one for loss) against the Los Angeles Chargers. Contributing to the team making their second consecutive Super Bowl appearance (Super Bowl LV against the Tampa Bay Buccaneers), where led the team with 10 tackles and also had one tackle for loss.

=== Jacksonville Jaguars ===
Wilson signed with the Jacksonville Jaguars on April 2, 2021. He had a career year, starting all 17 games at left inside linebacker, finishing second on the team with 104 tackles (5 for loss), 3 sacks, 5 passes defensed, one interception, one forced fumble and 2 special teams tackles. He had 7 tackles against the Houston Texans. He made 12 tackles against the Miami Dolphins. He had 10 tackles against the Tennessee Titans. He made 5 tackles one sack, one interception and one forced fumble in the season finale against the Indianapolis Colts. He was not re-signed after the season.

=== Carolina Panthers ===
On March 17, 2022, Wilson signed a two-year, $6.9 million contract with the Carolina Panthers. He played in 17 games with five starts at middle linebacker, recording 32 tackles (4 for loss), 2 sacks and 6 special teams tackles. He had 4 tackles and one sack in the season-opener against the Cleveland Browns. He made 9 tackles and one sack against the San Francisco 49ers.

In 2023, the team switched to a 3-4 defense and Wilson was not seen as a fit. On March 10, 2023, he was released by the Panthers.

=== Dallas Cowboys (second stint) ===
Wilson signed with the Cowboys' practice squad on January 3, 2024. He was not signed to a reserve/future contract after the season and thus became a free agent when his practice squad contract expired.

Wilson was re-signed by the Cowboys on April 29, 2024. He was waived on August 26.

== NFL career statistics ==
Legend
**Bold**	Career high

=== Regular season ===
Year	Team	Games		Tackles					Interceptions					Fumbles			
Year	Team	GP	GS	Cmb	Solo	Ast	Sck	TFL	Int	Yds	TD	Lng	PD	FF	FR	Yds	TD
2015	DAL	16	0	15	10	5	0.0	2	0	0	0	0	0	0	0	0	0
2016	DAL	16	6	34	27	7	0.5	4	0	0	0	0	1	0	0	0	0
2017	DAL	16	9	35	21	14	1.0	1	0	0	0	0	1	0	0	0	0
2018	DAL	16	7	37	28	9	1.0	2	0	0	0	0	0	**1**	0	0	0
2019	KAN	16	16	81	52	29	1.5	3	0	0	0	0	1	**1**	0	0	0
2020	KAN	13	13	73	46	27	0.0	3	0	0	0	0	1	**1**	0	0	0
2021	JAX	**17**	**17**	**106**	**59**	**47**	**3.0**	**5**	**1**	**1**	0	**1**	**5**	**1**	0	0	0
2022	CAR	**17**	5	38	23	15	2.0	4	0	0	0	0	0	**1**	0	0	0
Total		127	73	419	266	153	9.0	24	1	1	0	1	9	5	0	0	0

=== Playoffs ===
Year	Team	Games		Tackles					Interceptions					Fumbles			
Year	Team	GP	GS	Cmb	Solo	Ast	Sck	TFL	Int	Yds	TD	Lng	PD	FF	FR	Yds	TD
2016	DAL	1	0	1	1	0	0.0	0	0	0	0	0	0	0	0	0	0
2018	DAL	2	0	2	0	2	0.0	0	0	0	0	0	0	0	0	0	0
2019	KAN	**3**	**3**	**19**	**13**	**6**	0.0	**1**	0	0	0	0	0	0	0	0	0
2020	KAN	**3**	**3**	14	9	5	0.0	**1**	0	0	0	0	**1**	0	0	0	0
Total		9	6	36	23	13	0.0	2	0	0	0	0	1	0	0	0	0

== Personal life ==
On July 4, 2017, Wilson was arrested at Toyota Stadium on two counts of aggravated assault with a deadly weapon during an Independence Day celebration. He was then released on a $10,000 bond for each count.

On April 19, 2022, Wilson was arrested in Frisco, Texas for allegedly threatening to kill his ex-girlfriend. He was released on a $5,000 bond.
