= 2013 Dallas Cowboys season =

54th season in franchise history

- Owner: Jerry Jones
- General manager: Jerry Jones
- Head coach: Jason Garrett
- Home stadium: AT&T Stadium

Results
- Record: 8–8
- Division place: 2nd NFC East
- Playoffs: Did not qualify
- All-Pros: Tyron Smith (2nd team)
- Pro Bowlers: WR Dez Bryant; DT Jason Hatcher; RB DeMarco Murray; LT Tyron Smith; TE Jason Witten

Uniform
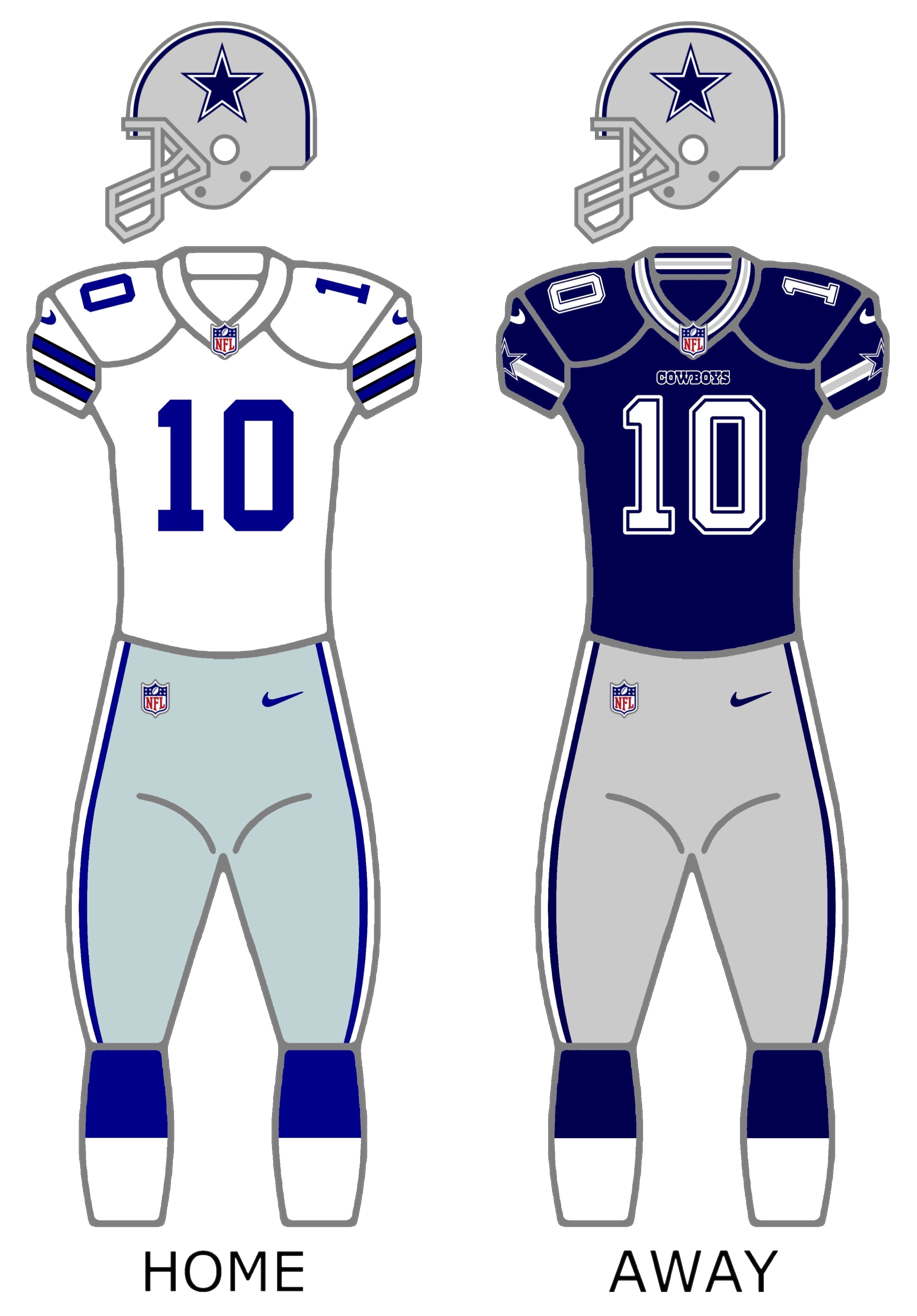

The 2013 season was the Dallas Cowboys' 54th in the National Football League (NFL), their fifth playing home games at AT&T Stadium (formerly known as "Cowboys Stadium") and the third full season under head coach Jason Garrett. The Cowboys finished 8–8 for a third consecutive season, but missed the playoffs for a fourth consecutive season after losing their final game for the third straight season, this time to the Philadelphia Eagles.

== 2013 draft class ==
2013 Dallas Cowboys Draft
| Round | Selection | Player | Position | College |
|---|---|---|---|---|
| 1 | 31 | Travis Frederick | C | Wisconsin |
| 2 | 47 | Gavin Escobar | TE | San Diego State |
| 3 | 74 | Terrance Williams | WR | Baylor |
| 3 | 80 | J. J. Wilcox | S | Georgia Southern |
| 4 | 114 | B. W. Webb | CB | William & Mary |
| 5 | 151 | Joseph Randle | RB | Oklahoma State |
| 6 | 185 | DeVonte Holloman | LB | South Carolina |

Notes

- The Cowboys traded their original first-round (#18) selection to the San Francisco 49ers in exchange for first (#31) and (#74) third-round selections.
- The Cowboys traded their seventh-round (#224) selection to the Miami Dolphins for offensive lineman Ryan Cook.

== Personnel ==
=== Staff / Coaches ===
2013 Dallas Cowboys staff
| Front office: Owner/president/general manager – Jerry Jones; COO/executive vice president/director of player personnel – Stephen Jones; Assistant director of player personnel – Tom Ciskowski; Director of football administration – Todd Williams; Assistant Director of pro scouting – Judd Garrett; Head coaches: Head coach – Jason Garrett; Offensive coaches: Offensive coordinator/offensive line – Bill Callahan; Quarterbacks – Wade Wilson; Running backs – Gary Brown; Wide receivers – Derek Dooley; Tight ends – Wes Phillips; Assistant offensive line – Frank Pollack; Offensive quality control/wide receivers – Keith O'Quinn; Offensive assistant – Dave Borgonzi; Senior coaching consultant – Jimmy Robinson | Defensive coaches: Defensive coordinator – Monte Kiffin; Defensive line – Rod Marinelli; Linebackers – Matt Eberflus; Secondary – Jerome Henderson; Assistant secondary – Joe Baker; Defensive assistant/defensive line – Leon Lett; Defensive quality control/linebackers – Ben Bloom; Special teams coaches: Special teams Coordinator – Rich Bisaccia; Assistant special teams/kickers – Chris Boniol; Strength and conditioning: Strength and conditioning – Mike Woicik; Assistant Strength and conditioning – Brett Bech |

=== Roster ===
2013 Dallas Cowboys roster
| Quarterbacks (QB): 3 Jon Kitna; 18 Kyle Orton; 9 Tony Romo; Running backs (RB): 44 Tyler Clutts FB; 29 DeMarco Murray; 21 Joseph Randle; 34 Phillip Tanner; Wide receivers (WR): 19 Miles Austin; 11 Cole Beasley; 88 Dez Bryant; 17 Dwayne Harris; 83 Terrance Williams; Tight ends (TE): 89 Gavin Escobar; 84 James Hanna; 82 Jason Witten | Offensive linemen (OL): 73 Mackenzy Bernadeau G; 67 Phil Costa C; 72 Travis Frederick C; 68 Doug Free T; 65 Ronald Leary G; 78 Jermey Parnell T; 77 Tyron Smith T; 75 Darrion Weems T; Defensive linemen (DL): 71 Everette Brown DE; 97 Jason Hatcher DT; 96 Nick Hayden DT; 69 Corvey Irvin DT; 55 Edgar Jones DE; 70 Frank Kearse DT; 99 George Selvie DE; 94 DeMarcus Ware DE; 56 Martez Wilson DE; 92 Jarius Wynn DE | Linebackers (LB): 54 Bruce Carter OLB; 57 DeVonte Holloman MLB; 53 Cameron Lawrence OLB; 50 Sean Lee MLB; 98 Orie Lemon OLB; 59 Ernie Sims; 51 Kyle Wilber OLB; Defensive backs (DB): 39 Brandon Carr CB; 42 Barry Church FS; 24 Morris Claiborne CB; 23 Jakar Hamilton FS; 38 Jeff Heath SS; 40 Danny McCray FS; 26 Sterling Moore CB; 32 Orlando Scandrick CB; 20 B. W. Webb CB; 27 J. J. Wilcox SS; Special teams (ST): 5 Dan Bailey K; 6 Chris Jones P; 91 L. P. Ladouceur LS | Practice squad: 16 Tim Benford WR; 66 Ray Dominguez G; 80 Jameson Konz TE; 86 Lance Lewis WR; 85 Jamar Newsome WR (PS/I); 95 Caesar Rayford DE; 81 Lanear Sampson WR; 48 Jonathan Stewart LB; 61 John Wetzel T; Reserve: 79 Ben Bass DT/DE (IR); 63 Ryan Cook C (IR); -- Tyrone Crawford DE (IR); 25 Lance Dunbar RB (IR); 52 Justin Durant (IR); 37 Matt Johnson FS (IR); 93 Anthony Spencer DE (IR); 64 Brian Waters G (IR); Rookies in italics 53 active, 9 reserve, 8 practice squad |

== Schedule ==
=== Preseason ===
| Week | Date | Opponent | Result | Record | Game site | NFL.com recap |
|---|---|---|---|---|---|---|
| HOF | August 4 | vs. Miami Dolphins | **W** 24–20 | 1–0 | Fawcett Stadium (Canton, Ohio) | Recap |
| 1 | August 9 | at Oakland Raiders | **L** 17–19 | 1–1 | O.co Coliseum | Recap |
| 2 | August 17 | at Arizona Cardinals | **L** 7–12 | 1–2 | University of Phoenix Stadium | Recap |
| 3 | August 24 | Cincinnati Bengals | **W** 24–18 | 2–2 | AT&T Stadium | Recap |
| 4 | August 29 | Houston Texans | **L** 6–24 | 2–3 | AT&T Stadium | Recap |

=== Regular season ===
| Week | Date | Opponent | Result | Record | Game site | NFL.com recap |
|---|---|---|---|---|---|---|
| 1 | September 8 | **New York Giants** | **W** 36–31 | 1–0 | AT&T Stadium | Recap |
| 2 | September 15 | at Kansas City Chiefs | **L** 16–17 | 1–1 | Arrowhead Stadium | Recap |
| 3 | September 22 | St. Louis Rams | **W** 31–7 | 2–1 | AT&T Stadium | Recap |
| 4 | September 29 | at San Diego Chargers | **L** 21–30 | 2–2 | Qualcomm Stadium | Recap |
| 5 | October 6 | Denver Broncos | **L** 48–51 | 2–3 | AT&T Stadium | Recap |
| 6 | October 13 | **Washington Redskins** | **W** 31–16 | 3–3 | AT&T Stadium | Recap |
| 7 | October 20 | at **Philadelphia Eagles** | **W** 17–3 | 4–3 | Lincoln Financial Field | Recap |
| 8 | October 27 | at Detroit Lions | **L** 30–31 | 4–4 | Ford Field | Recap |
| 9 | November 3 | Minnesota Vikings | **W** 27–23 | 5–4 | AT&T Stadium | Recap |
| 10 | November 10 | at New Orleans Saints | **L** 17–49 | 5–5 | Mercedes-Benz Superdome | Recap |
| 11 | Bye | | | | | |
| 12 | November 24 | at **New York Giants** | **W** 24–21 | 6–5 | MetLife Stadium | Recap |
| 13 | November 28 | Oakland Raiders | **W** 31–24 | 7–5 | AT&T Stadium | Recap |
| 14 | December 9 | at Chicago Bears | **L** 28–45 | 7–6 | Soldier Field | Recap |
| 15 | December 15 | Green Bay Packers | **L** 36–37 | 7–7 | AT&T Stadium | Recap |
| 16 | December 22 | at **Washington Redskins** | **W** 24–23 | 8–7 | FedExField | Recap |
| 17 | December 29 | **Philadelphia Eagles** | **L** 22–24 | 8–8 | AT&T Stadium | Recap |

Note: Intra-division opponents are in bold text.

=== Game summaries ===
==== Week 1: vs. New York Giants ====
Week One: New York Giants at Dallas Cowboys – Game summary

| Quarter | 1 | 2 | 3 | 4 | Total |
|---|---|---|---|---|---|
| Giants | 3 | 7 | 7 | 14 | **31** |
| **Cowboys** | 3 | 10 | 14 | 9 | **36** |

at AT&T Stadium, Arlington, Texas

- Date: September 8
- Game time: 7:20 p.m. CDT
- Game weather: Played indoors (retractable roof closed)
- Game attendance: 85,348
- Referee: Tony Corrente
- TV announcers (NBC): Al Michaels, Cris Collinsworth and Michele Tafoya
- Recap, Game book

Game information

**First quarter**

- DAL – Dan Bailey 30–yard field goal, 13:04. Cowboys 3–0. **Drive: 4 plays, 3 yards, 1:49.**
- NYG – Josh Brown 20–yard field goal, 2:02. Tied 3–3. **Drive: 4 plays, -1 yards, 1:58.**

**Second quarter**

- DAL – Dan Bailey 38–yard field goal, 10:02. Cowboys 6–3. **Drive: 14 plays, 60 yards, 7:00.**
- DAL – Jason Witten 15–yard pass from Tony Romo (Dan Bailey kick), 2:55. Cowboys 13–3. **Drive: 9 plays, 71 yards, 4:57.**
- NYG – Victor Cruz 70–yard pass from Eli Manning (Josh Brown kick), 1:50. Cowboys 13–10. **Drive: 3 plays, 80 yards, 1:05.**

**Third quarter**

- DAL – Barry Church 27–yard defensive fumble return (Dan Bailey kick), 12:31. Cowboys 20–10.
- DAL – Jason Witten 4–yard pass from Tony Romo (Dan Bailey kick), 4:55. Cowboys 27–10. **Drive: 2 plays, 16 yards, 0:49.**
- NYG – Victor Cruz 18–yard pass from Eli Manning (Josh Brown kick), 1:44. Cowboys 27–17. **Drive: 8 plays, 80 yards, 3:11.**

**Fourth quarter**

- DAL – Dan Bailey 45–yard field goal, 12:10. Cowboys 30–17. **Drive: 8 plays, 53 yards, 4:34.**
- NYG – Victor Cruz 10–yard pass from Eli Manning (Josh Brown kick), 8:47. Cowboys 30–24. **Drive: 7 plays, 90 yards, 3:23.**
- DAL – Brandon Carr 49–yard interception return (pass failed), 1:50. Cowboys 36–24.
- NYG – Brandon Myers 4–yard pass from Eli Manning (Josh Brown kick), 0:11. Cowboys 36–31. **Drive: 9 plays, 80 yards, 1:39.**

**Top passers**

- NYG – Eli Manning – 27/42, 450 yards, 4 TD, 3 INT
- DAL – Tony Romo – 36/49, 263 yards, 2 TD, INT

**Top rushers**

- NYG – Da'Rel Scott – 5 rushes, 23 yards
- DAL – DeMarco Murray – 20 rushes, 86 yards

**Top receivers**

- NYG – Victor Cruz – 5 receptions, 118 yards, 3 TD
- DAL – Miles Austin – 10 receptions, 72 yards

This was the Cowboys' first home win against the Giants since 2008, and their first win against the Giants at AT&T Stadium.

==== Week 2: at Kansas City Chiefs ====
Week Two: Dallas Cowboys at Kansas City Chiefs – Game summary

| Quarter | 1 | 2 | 3 | 4 | Total |
|---|---|---|---|---|---|
| Cowboys | 10 | 0 | 3 | 3 | **16** |
| **Chiefs** | 7 | 0 | 7 | 3 | **17** |

at Arrowhead Stadium, Kansas City, Missouri

- Date: September 15
- Game time: 12:00 p.m. CDT
- Game weather: 72 °F (22 °C), sunny
- Game attendance: 76,952
- Referee: Jerome Boger
- TV announcers (Fox): Chris Myers, Tim Ryan and Jennifer Hale
- Recap, Game book

Game information

**First quarter**

- KC – Jamaal Charles 2–yard pass from Alex Smith (Ryan Succop kick), 8:13. Chiefs 7–0. **Drive: 13 plays, 77 yards, 6:47.**
- DAL – Dan Bailey 51–yard field goal, 5:02. Chiefs 7–3. **Drive: 6 plays, 47 yards, 3:11.**
- DAL – Dez Bryant 2–yard pass from Tony Romo (Dan Bailey kick), 0:36. Cowboys 10–7. **Drive: 6 plays, 55 yards, 3:20.**

**Second quarter**

- No scoring plays

**Third quarter**

- DAL – Dan Bailey 30–yard field goal, 6:54. Cowboys 13–7. **Drive: 13 plays, 68 yards, 8:06.**
- KC – Dwayne Bowe 12–yard pass from Alex Smith (Ryan Succop kick), 2:53. Chiefs 14–13. **Drive: 10 plays, 80 yards, 4:01.**

**Fourth quarter**

- KC – Ryan Succop 40–yard field goal, 14:06. Chiefs 17–13. **Drive: 4 plays, 9 yards, 1:32.**
- DAL – Dan Bailey 53–yard field goal, 3:50. Chiefs 17–16. **Drive: 9 plays, 45 yards, 2:53.**

**Top passers**

- DAL – Tony Romo – 30/42, 298 yards, TD
- KC – Alex Smith – 21/36, 223 yards, 2 TD

**Top rushers**

- DAL – DeMarco Murray – 12 rushes, 25 yards
- KC – Jamaal Charles – 16 rushes, 55 yards

**Top receivers**

- DAL – Dez Bryant – 9 receptions, 141 yards, TD
- KC – Dwayne Bowe – 4 receptions, 56 yards, TD

==== Week 3: vs. St. Louis Rams ====
Week Three: St. Louis Rams at Dallas Cowboys – Game summary

| Quarter | 1 | 2 | 3 | 4 | Total |
|---|---|---|---|---|---|
| Rams | 0 | 0 | 7 | 0 | **7** |
| **Cowboys** | 10 | 7 | 7 | 7 | **31** |

at AT&T Stadium, Arlington, Texas

- Date: September 22
- Game time: 12:00 p.m. CDT
- Game weather: Played indoors (retractable roof closed)
- Game attendance: 80,848
- Referee: Carl Cheffers
- TV announcers (Fox): Kenny Albert, Daryl Johnston and Tony Siragusa
- Recap, Game book

Game information

**First quarter**

- DAL – Dez Bryant 2–yard pass from Tony Romo (Dan Bailey kick), 7:06. Cowboys 7–0. **Drive: 8 plays, 61 yards, 4:52.**
- DAL – Dan Bailey 19–yard field goal, 2:06. Cowboys 10–0. **Drive: 8 plays, 58 yards, 3:57.**

**Second quarter**

- DAL – DeMarco Murray 2–yard run (Dan Bailey kick), 9:10. Cowboys 17–0. **Drive: 10 plays, 67 yards, 5:50.**

**Third quarter**

- DAL – Gavin Escobar 24–yard pass from Tony Romo (Dan Bailey kick), 11:39. Cowboys 24–0. **Drive: 6 plays, 80 yards, 3:21.**
- STL – Austin Pettis 4–yard pass from Sam Bradford (Greg Zuerlein kick), 3:20. Cowboys 24–7. **Drive: 13 plays, 75 yards, 6:15.**

**Fourth quarter**

- DAL – Dwayne Harris 24–yard pass from Tony Romo (Dan Bailey kick), 11:55. Cowboys 31–7. **Drive: 3 plays, 45 yards, 1:24.**

**Top passers**

- STL – Sam Bradford – 29/48, 240 yards, TD
- DAL – Tony Romo – 17/24, 210 yards, 3 TD

**Top rushers**

- STL – Isaiah Pead – 6 rushes, 20 yards
- DAL – DeMarco Murray – 26 rushes, 175 yards, TD

**Top receivers**

- STL – Chris Givens – 2 receptions, 54 yards
- DAL – Jason Witten – 5 receptions, 67 yards

==== Week 4: at San Diego Chargers ====
Week Four: Dallas Cowboys at San Diego Chargers – Game summary

| Quarter | 1 | 2 | 3 | 4 | Total |
|---|---|---|---|---|---|
| Cowboys | 0 | 21 | 0 | 0 | **21** |
| **Chargers** | 7 | 6 | 7 | 10 | **30** |

at Qualcomm Stadium, San Diego, California

- Date: September 29
- Game time: 3:25 p.m. CDT/1:25 p.m. PDT
- Game weather: 80 °F (27 °C), sunny
- Game attendance: 68,601
- Referee: Ed Hochuli
- TV announcers (Fox): Kenny Albert, Daryl Johnston and Tony Siragusa
- Recap, Game book

Game information

**First quarter**

- SD – Danny Woodhead 26–yard pass from Philip Rivers (Nick Novak kick), 7:05. Chargers 7–0. **Drive: 5 plays, 65 yards, 3:01.**

**Second quarter**

- DAL – Dez Bryant 5–yard pass from Tony Romo (Dan Bailey kick), 13:10. Tied 7–7. **Drive: 9 plays, 85 yards, 3:58.**
- SD – Nick Novak 36–yard field goal, 5:11. Chargers 10–7. **Drive: 6 plays, 36 yards, 2:27.**
- DAL – Dez Bryant 34–yard pass from Tony Romo (Dan Bailey kick), 2:36. Cowboys 14–10. **Drive: 5 plays, 72 yards, 2:35.**
- DAL – Sean Lee 52–yard interception return (Dan Bailey kick), 1:19. Cowboys 21–10.
- SD – Nick Novak 42–yard field goal, 0:00. Cowboys 21–13. **Drive: 8 plays, 66 yards, 1:19.**

**Third quarter**

- SD – Danny Woodhead 13–yard pass from Philip Rivers (Nick Novak kick), 9:32. Cowboys 21–20. **Drive: 10 plays, 80 yards, 5:28.**

**Fourth quarter**

- SD – Nick Novak 23–yard field goal, 14:46. Chargers 23–21. **Drive: 13 plays, 84 yards, 6:23.**
- SD – Antonio Gates 54–yard pass from Philip Rivers (Nick Novak kick), 6:54. Chargers 30–21. **Drive: 6 plays, 80 yards, 3:08.**

**Top passers**

- DAL – Tony Romo – 27/37, 246 yards, 2 TD
- SD – Philip Rivers – 35/42, 401 yards, 3 TD, INT

**Top rushers**

- DAL – DeMarco Murray – 14 rushes, 70 yards
- SD – Ryan Matthews – 19 rushes, 62 yards

**Top receivers**

- DAL – Dez Bryant – 6 receptions, 81 yards, 2 TD
- SD – Antonio Gates – 10 receptions, 136 yards, TD

==== Week 5: vs. Denver Broncos ====
Week Five: Denver Broncos at Dallas Cowboys – Game summary

| Quarter | 1 | 2 | 3 | 4 | Total |
|---|---|---|---|---|---|
| **Broncos** | 7 | 21 | 10 | 13 | **51** |
| Cowboys | 14 | 6 | 13 | 15 | **48** |

at AT&T Stadium, Arlington, Texas

- Date: October 6
- Game time: 3:25 p.m. CDT
- Game weather: Played indoors (retractable roof closed)
- Game attendance: 92,758
- Referee: Terry McAulay
- TV announcers (CBS): Jim Nantz and Phil Simms
- Recap, Game book

Game information

**First quarter**

- DAL – Dez Bryant 2–yard pass from Tony Romo (Dan Bailey kick), 8:06. Cowboys 7–0. **Drive: 11 plays, 79 yards, 6:54.**
- DAL – DeMarco Murray 4–yard run (Dan Bailey kick), 3:18. Cowboys 14–0. **Drive: 7 plays, 45 yards, 3:35.**
- DEN – Julius Thomas 4–yard pass from Peyton Manning (Matt Prater kick), 2:28. Cowboys 14–7. **Drive: 3 plays, 80 yards, 0:50.**

**Second quarter**

- DAL – Dan Bailey 43–yard field goal, 12:14. Cowboys 17–7. **Drive: 10 plays, 55 yards, 5:14.**
- DEN – Eric Decker 2–yard pass from Peyton Manning (Matt Prater kick), 9:06. Cowboys 17–14. **Drive: 7 plays, 80 yards, 3:08.**
- DEN – Julius Thomas 9–yard pass from Peyton Manning (Matt Prater kick), 5:22. Broncos 21–17. **Drive: 6 plays, 41 yards, 3:27.**
- DEN – Peyton Manning 1–yard run (Matt Prater kick), 0:46. Broncos 28–17. **Drive: 7 plays, 64 yards, 2:24.**
- DAL – Dan Bailey 48–yard field goal, 0:00. Broncos 28–20. **Drive: 4 plays, 43 yards, 0:46.**

**Third quarter**

- DEN – Wes Welker 2–yard pass from Peyton Manning (Matt Prater kick), 8:03. Broncos 35–20. **Drive: 13 plays, 67 yards, 6:57.**
- DAL – Terrance Williams 82–yard pass from Tony Romo (Dan Bailey kick), 7:08. Broncos 35–27. **Drive: 2 plays, 83 yards, 0:55.**
- DEN – Matt Prater 48–yard field goal, 3:23. Broncos 38–27. **Drive: 8 plays, 50 yards, 3:45.**
- DAL – Dez Bryant 2–yard pass from Tony Romo (run failed), 0:14. Broncos 38–33. **Drive: 7 plays, 80 yards, 3:09.**

**Fourth quarter**

- DAL – Jason Witten 10–yard pass from Tony Romo (Tony Romo–Terrance Williams pass), 13:38. Cowboys 41–38. **Drive: 5 plays, 51 yards, 1:24.**
- DEN – Matt Prater 50–yard field goal, 9:37. Tied 41–41. **Drive: 11 plays, 51 yards, 4:01.**
- DAL – Cole Beasley 4–yard pass from Tony Romo (Dan Bailey kick), 7:19. Cowboys 48–41. **Drive: 4 plays, 87 yards, 2:18.**
- DEN – Knowshon Moreno 1–yard run (Matt Prater kick), 2:39. Tied 48–48. **Drive: 9 plays, 73 yards, 4:40.**
- DEN – Matt Prater 28–yard field goal, 0:00. Broncos 51–48. **Drive: 8 plays, 14 yards, 1:57.**

**Top passers**

- DEN – Peyton Manning – 33/42, 414 yards, 4 TD, INT
- DAL – Tony Romo – 25/36, 506 yards, 5 TD, INT

**Top rushers**

- DEN – Knowshon Moreno – 19 rushes, 93 yards, TD
- DAL – DeMarco Murray – 12 rushes, 43 yards, TD

**Top receivers**

- DEN – Julius Thomas – 9 receptions, 122 yards, 2 TD
- DAL – Terrance Williams – 4 receptions, 151 yards, TD

Coming off their loss to the Chargers, the Cowboys hosted the Denver Broncos at home for an interconference duel. The Cowboys grabbed a 14–0 lead in the first quarter, with a 2-yard touchdown pass from quarterback Tony Romo to wide receiver Dez Bryant, followed by running back DeMarco Murray rushing for a 4-yard touchdown. The latter score occurred after a fumble by Broncos' wide receiver Eric Decker. The Broncos later got on the scoreboard, with quarterback Peyton Manning connecting on a 4-yard shovel pass to tight end Julius Thomas for a touchdown. Early in the second quarter, a 43-yard field goal by placekicker Dan Bailey gave the Cowboys a 17–7 lead. The Broncos then reeled off 21 unanswered points, with Manning adding two more touchdown passes — a 2-yarder to Decker and a 9-yarder to Thomas, followed by Manning rushing for a 1-yard touchdown on a bootleg play. A 48-yard field goal by Bailey at the end of the first half narrowed the Broncos' lead to 28–20.

In the second half, the Broncos added to their lead midway through the third quarter, with Manning connecting on a 2-yard touchdown pass to wide receiver Wes Welker. However, the Cowboys subsequently began chipping away at the Broncos’ lead, with Romo connecting on an 82-yard touchdown pass to wide receiver Terrance Williams. A 48-yard field goal by placekicker Matt Prater gave the Broncos a 38–27 lead, but the Cowboys further narrowed the Broncos' lead, with a 2-yard touchdown pass from Romo to Bryant (with an unsuccessful two-point conversion attempt). Following an intercepted Broncos' pass, the Cowboys subsequently re-claimed the lead early in the fourth quarter, with Romo throwing a 10-yard touchdown pass to tight end Jason Witten, coupled with a two-point pass from Romo to Williams. The Broncos tied the game at 41–41 on their next possession, with a 50-yard field goal by Prater. As the shootout continued, on the Cowboys' next possession, Romo connected on a 4-yard touchdown pass to wide receiver Cole Beasley to give the Cowboys a 48–41 lead with 7:19 remaining in the fourth quarter.

Manning subsequently led the Broncos on a 9-play, 73-yard drive, which culminated with running back Knowshon Moreno rushing for a 1-yard touchdown to tie the game at 48–48 with 2:24 remaining in the fourth quarter. Two plays into the Cowboys' next possession, as the Cowboys were attempting a game-winning drive, Romo was intercepted by Broncos’ linebacker Danny Trevathan at the Cowboys' 24-yard line just before the two-minute warning. On the fourth play of the Broncos' final possession, the Broncos were facing a 3rd-and-1 at the Cowboys' 2-yard line, after the Cowboys had exhausted two of their three team timeouts. Moreno earned a crucial first down after Manning implored him to go down before reaching the goal line instead of scoring a touchdown, which forced the Cowboys to burn their final timeout with 1:35 remaining in the fourth quarter. After three kneel-downs by Manning, Prater nailed the game-winning 28-yard field goal as time expired. With the loss, the Cowboys moved to 2–3, and dropped to second place in the division. Romo passed for 506 yards in this shootout, and his 36 attempted passes is the fewest by any quarterback who managed to pass for 500 yards in one game.

==== Week 6: vs. Washington Redskins ====
Week Six: Washington Redskins at Dallas Cowboys – Game summary

| Quarter | 1 | 2 | 3 | 4 | Total |
|---|---|---|---|---|---|
| Redskins | 3 | 3 | 10 | 0 | **16** |
| **Cowboys** | 7 | 7 | 7 | 10 | **31** |

at AT&T Stadium, Arlington, Texas

- Date: October 13
- Game time: 7:20 p.m. CDT
- Game weather: Played indoors (retractable roof closed)
- Game attendance: 90,239
- Referee: Walt Anderson
- TV announcers (NBC): Al Michaels, Cris Collinsworth and Michele Tafoya
- Recap, Game book

Game information

**First quarter**

- DAL – DeMarco Murray 4-yard run (Dan Bailey kick), 8:52. Cowboys 7–0. **Drive: 10 plays, 80 yards, 6:08.**
- WAS – Kai Forbath 20-yard field goal, 1:38. Cowboys 7–3. **Drive: 13 plays, 78 yards, 7:14.**

**Second quarter**

- DAL – Dwayne Harris 86-yard punt return (Dan Bailey kick), 2:26. Cowboys 14–3.
- WAS – Kai Forbath 32-yard field goal, 0:00. Cowboys 14–6. **Drive: 11 plays, 68 yards, 2:26.**

**Third quarter**

- WAS – Kai Forbath 33-yard field goal, 10:03. Cowboys 14–9. **Drive: 10 plays, 65 yards, 4:57.**
- DAL – Terrance Williams 15-yard pass from Tony Romo (Dan Bailey kick), 9:03. Cowboys 21–9. **Drive: 2 plays, 15 yards, 1:00.**
- WAS – Alfred Morris 45-yard run (Kai Forbath kick), 3:43. Cowboys 21–16. **Drive: 3 plays, 71 yards, 0:37.**

**Fourth quarter**

- DAL – Dan Bailey 30-yard field goal, 10:36. Cowboys 24–16. **Drive: 9 plays, 49 yards, 4:06.**
- DAL – Joseph Randle 1-yard run (Dan Bailey kick), 8:49. Cowboys 31–16. **Drive: 2 plays, 3 yards, 0:47.**

**Top passers**

- WAS – Robert Griffin III – 19/39, 246 yards, INT
- DAL – Tony Romo – 18/30, 170 yards, TD, INT

**Top rushers**

- WAS – Alfred Morris – 16 rushes, 81 yards, TD
- DAL – DeMarco Murray – 7 rushes, 29 yards, TD

**Top receivers**

- WAS – Pierre Garçon – 6 receptions, 69 yards
- DAL – Cole Beasley – 4 receptions, 44 yards

==== Week 7: at Philadelphia Eagles ====
Week Seven: Dallas Cowboys at Philadelphia Eagles – Game summary

| Quarter | 1 | 2 | 3 | 4 | Total |
|---|---|---|---|---|---|
| **Cowboys** | 0 | 3 | 7 | 7 | **17** |
| Eagles | 0 | 0 | 0 | 3 | **3** |

at Lincoln Financial Field, Philadelphia, Pennsylvania

- Date: October 20
- Game time: 1:00 p.m. EDT/12:00 p.m. CDT
- Game weather: 60 °F (16 °C), sunny
- Game attendance: 69,144
- Referee: John Parry
- TV announcers (Fox): Thom Brennaman, Troy Aikman and Pam Oliver
- Recap, Game book

Game information

**First quarter**

- No scoring plays

**Second quarter**

- DAL – Dan Bailey 38–yard field goal, 3:17. Cowboys 3–0. **Drive: 8 plays, 44 yards, 3:42.**

**Third quarter**

- DAL – Phillip Tanner 1–yard run (Dan Bailey kick), 9:17. Cowboys 10–0. **Drive: 10 plays, 66 yards, 5:43.**

**Fourth quarter**

- PHI – Alex Henery 31–yard field goal, 14:57. Cowboys 10–3. **Drive: 10 plays, 17 yards, 2:49.**
- DAL – Terrance Williams 9–yard pass from Tony Romo (Dan Bailey kick), 9:25. Cowboys 17–3. **Drive: 10 plays, 72 yards, 5:32.**

**Top passers**

- DAL – Tony Romo – 28/47, 317 yards, TD, 2 INT
- PHI – Matt Barkley – 11/20, 129 yards, 3 INT

**Top rushers**

- DAL – Joseph Randle – 19 rushes, 65 yards
- PHI – LeSean McCoy – 18 rushes, 55 yards

**Top receivers**

- DAL – Dez Bryant – 8 receptions, 110 yards
- PHI – Riley Cooper – 6 receptions, 88 yards

==== Week 8: at Detroit Lions ====
Week Eight: Dallas Cowboys at Detroit Lions – Game summary

| Quarter | 1 | 2 | 3 | 4 | Total |
|---|---|---|---|---|---|
| Cowboys | 0 | 10 | 3 | 17 | **30** |
| **Lions** | 7 | 0 | 0 | 24 | **31** |

at Ford Field, Detroit, Michigan

- Date: October 27
- Game time: 1:00 p.m. EDT/12:00 p.m. CDT
- Game weather: Played indoors (dome stadium)
- Game attendance: 64,379
- Referee: Bill Vinovich
- TV announcers (Fox): Dick Stockton, Brian Billick and Laura Okmin
- Recap, Game book

Game information

**First quarter**

- DET – Calvin Johnson 2–yard pass from Matthew Stafford (David Akers kick), 0:54. Lions 7–0. **Drive: 6 plays, 90 yards, 2:27.**

**Second quarter**

- DAL – Dan Bailey 53–yard field goal, 5:39. Lions 7–3. **Drive: 9 plays, 45 yards, 4:37.**
- DAL – Dez Bryant 5–yard pass from Tony Romo (Dan Bailey kick), 0:46. Cowboys 10–7. **Drive: 3 plays, 4 yards, 0:52.**

**Third quarter**

- DAL – Dan Bailey 53–yard field goal, 3:02. Cowboys 13–7. **Drive: 4 plays, 0 yards, 0:56.**

**Fourth quarter**

- DET – David Akers 20–yard field goal, 13:13. Cowboys 13–10. **Drive: 10 plays, 61 yards, 4:49.**
- DAL – Terrance Williams 60–yard pass from Tony Romo (Dan Bailey kick), 11:32. Cowboys 20–10. **Drive: 3 plays, 71 yards, 1:41.**
- DET – Joique Bell 1–yard run (David Akers kick), 7:38. Cowboys 20–17. **Drive: 7 plays, 80 yards, 3:54.**
- DAL – Dez Bryant 50–yard pass from Tony Romo (Dan Bailey kick), 6:45. Cowboys 27–17. **Drive: 2 plays, 52 yards, 0:53.**
- DET – Reggie Bush 1–yard run (David Akers kick), 3:33. Cowboys 27–24. **Drive: 7 plays, 80 yards, 3:12.**
- DAL – Dan Bailey 44–yard field goal, 1:02. Cowboys 30–24. **Drive: 4 plays, 5 yards, 0:22.**
- DET – Matthew Stafford 1–yard run (David Akers kick), 0:12. Lions 31–30. **Drive: 6 plays, 80 yards, 0:50.**

**Top passers**

- DAL – Tony Romo – 14/30, 206 yards, 3 TD
- DET – Matthew Stafford – 33/48, 488 yards, TD, 2 INT

**Top rushers**

- DAL – Joseph Randle – 14 rushes, 26 yards
- DET – Reggie Bush – 21 rushes, 92 yards, TD

**Top receivers**

- DAL – Dez Bryant – 3 receptions, 72 yards, 2 TD
- DET – Calvin Johnson – 14 receptions, 329 yards, TD

Dez Bryant was the topic of the close loss as he was engaged in several sideline rants throughout the second half.

==== Week 9: vs. Minnesota Vikings ====
Week Nine: Minnesota Vikings at Dallas Cowboys – Game summary

| Quarter | 1 | 2 | 3 | 4 | Total |
|---|---|---|---|---|---|
| Vikings | 3 | 7 | 7 | 6 | **23** |
| **Cowboys** | 3 | 3 | 14 | 7 | **27** |

at AT&T Stadium, Arlington, Texas

- Date: November 3
- Game time: 12:00 p.m. CST
- Game weather: Played indoors (retractable roof closed)
- Game attendance: 85,360
- Referee: Jeff Triplette
- TV announcers (Fox): Joe Buck, Troy Aikman and Pam Oliver
- Recap, Game book

Game information

**First quarter**

- DAL – Dan Bailey 41–yard field goal, 6:51. Cowboys 3–0. **Drive: 9 plays, 56 yards, 4:15.**
- MIN – Blair Walsh 23–yard field goal, 2:08. Tied 3–3. **Drive: 11 plays, 59 yards, 4:43.**

**Second quarter**

- DAL – Dan Bailey 41–yard field goal, 6:35. Cowboys 6–3. **Drive: 12 plays, 58 yards, 6:56.**
- MIN – Christian Ponder 6–yard run (Blair Walsh kick), 1:41. Vikings 10–6. **Drive: 11 plays, 79 yards, 4:51.**

**Third quarter**

- DAL – Jason Witten 26–yard pass from Tony Romo (Dan Bailey kick), 11:38. Cowboys 13–10. **Drive: 6 plays, 74 yards, 3:22.**
- DAL – Nick Hayden defensive fumble recovery in end zone (Dan Bailey kick), 11:28. Cowboys 20–10.
- MIN – Kyle Rudolph 31–yard pass from Christian Ponder (Blair Walsh kick), 8:11. Cowboys 20–17. **Drive: 6 plays, 77 yards, 3:17.**

**Fourth quarter**

- MIN – Adrian Peterson 11–yard run (Blair Walsh kick failed), 5:40. Vikings 23–20. **Drive: 8 plays, 87 yards, 4:52.**
- DAL – Dwayne Harris 7–yard pass from Tony Romo (Dan Bailey kick), 0:35. Cowboys 27–23. **Drive: 9 plays, 90 yards, 2:09.**

**Top passers**

- MIN – Christian Ponder – 25/37, 236 yards, TD, INT
- DAL – Tony Romo – 34/51, 337 yards, 2 TD, INT

**Top rushers**

- MIN – Adrian Peterson – 25 rushes, 140 yards, TD
- DAL – DeMarco Murray – 4 rushes, 31 yards

**Top receivers**

- MIN – Greg Jennings – 6 receptions, 56 yards
- DAL – Jason Witten – 8 receptions, 102 yards, TD

As of 2025, this was the most recent time that the home team won in the series.

==== Week 10: at New Orleans Saints ====
Week Ten: Dallas Cowboys at New Orleans Saints – Game summary

| Quarter | 1 | 2 | 3 | 4 | Total |
|---|---|---|---|---|---|
| Cowboys | 3 | 7 | 7 | 0 | **17** |
| **Saints** | 7 | 21 | 7 | 14 | **49** |

at Mercedes-Benz Superdome, New Orleans, Louisiana

- Date: November 10
- Game time: 7:20 p.m. CST
- Game weather: Played indoors (dome stadium)
- Game attendance: 73,018
- Referee: Jerome Boger
- TV announcers (NBC): Al Michaels, Cris Collinsworth and Michele Tafoya
- Recap, Game book

Game information

**First quarter**

- DAL – Dan Bailey 37–yard field goal, 8:14. Cowboys 3–0. **Drive: 4 plays, 4 yards, 1:22.**
- NO – Marques Colston 22–yard pass from Drew Brees (Garrett Hartley kick), 3:23. Saints 7–3. **Drive: 9 plays, 80 yards, 4:51.**

**Second quarter**

- DAL – DeMarco Murray 7–yard run (Dan Bailey kick), 14:05. Cowboys 10–7. **Drive: 8 plays, 72 yards, 4:18.**
- NO – Pierre Thomas 1–yard pass from Drew Brees (Garrett Hartley kick), 5:09. Saints 14–10. **Drive: 15 plays, 80 yards, 8:56.**
- NO – Darren Sproles 3–yard run (Garrett Hartley kick), 1:32. Saints 21–10. **Drive: 9 plays, 52 yards, 2:29.**
- NO – Darren Sproles 28–yard pass from Drew Brees (Garrett Hartley kick), 0:05. Saints 28–10. **Drive: 6 plays, 75 yards, 0:48.**

**Third quarter**

- NO – Mark Ingram II 4–yard run (Garrett Hartley kick), 2:12. Saints 35–10. **Drive: 6 plays, 92 yards, 2:43.**
- DAL – Terrance Williams 21–yard pass from Tony Romo (Dan Bailey kick), 0:41. Saints 35–17. **Drive: 5 plays, 89 yards, 1:31.**

**Fourth quarter**

- NO – Kenny Stills 52–yard pass from Drew Brees (Garrett Hartley kick), 12:43. Saints 42–17. **Drive: 6 plays, 83 yards, 2:30.**
- NO – Pierre Thomas 1–yard run (Garrett Hartley kick), 5:44. Saints 49–17. **Drive: 8 plays, 78 yards, 5:27.**

**Top passers**

- DAL – Tony Romo – 10/24, 128 yards, TD
- NO – Drew Brees – 34/41, 392 yards, 4 TD

**Top rushers**

- DAL – DeMarco Murray – 16 rushes, 89 yards, TD
- NO – Mark Ingram II – 14 rushes, 145 yards, TD

**Top receivers**

- DAL – Dez Bryant – 1 reception, 44 yards
- NO – Marques Colston – 7 receptions, 107 yards, TD

==== Week 12: at New York Giants ====
Week Twelve: Dallas Cowboys at New York Giants – Game summary

| Quarter | 1 | 2 | 3 | 4 | Total |
|---|---|---|---|---|---|
| **Cowboys** | 7 | 7 | 7 | 3 | **24** |
| Giants | 0 | 6 | 7 | 8 | **21** |

at MetLife Stadium, East Rutherford, New Jersey

- Date: November 24
- Game time: 4:25 p.m. EST/3:25 p.m. CST
- Game weather: 25 °F (−4 °C), windy
- Game attendance: 80,499
- Referee: Walt Anderson
- TV announcers (Fox): Joe Buck, Troy Aikman and Pam Oliver
- Recap, Game book

Game information

**First quarter**

- DAL – Jeff Heath 50–yard defensive fumble return (Dan Bailey kick), 4:17. Cowboys 7–0.

**Second quarter**

- NYG – Josh Brown 21–yard field goal, 12:40. Cowboys 7–3. **Drive: 10 plays, 74 yards, 6:37.**
- DAL – Jason Witten 22–yard pass from Tony Romo (Dan Bailey kick), 9:37. Cowboys 14–3. **Drive: 5 plays, 80 yards, 3:03.**
- NYG – Josh Brown 23–yard field goal, 5:18. Cowboys 14–6. **Drive: 8 plays, 65 yards, 4:19.**

**Third quarter**

- DAL – Jason Witten 2–yard pass from Tony Romo (Dan Bailey kick), 6:54. Cowboys 21–6. **Drive: 10 plays, 65 yards, 5:41.**
- NYG – Brandon Myers 27–yard pass from Eli Manning (Josh Brown kick), 4:33. Cowboys 21–13. **Drive: 6 plays, 67 yards, 2:21.**

**Fourth quarter**

- NYG – Louis Murphy 4–yard pass from Eli Manning (Andre Brown run), 4:45. Tied 21–21. **Drive: 8 plays, 58 yards, 4:13.**
- DAL – Dan Bailey 35–yard field goal, 0:00. Cowboys 24–21. **Drive: 14 plays, 64 yards, 4:45.**

**Top passers**

- DAL – Tony Romo – 23/38, 234 yards, 2 TD, INT
- NYG – Eli Manning – 16/30, 174 yards, 2 TD

**Top rushers**

- DAL – DeMarco Murray – 14 rushes, 86 yards
- NYG – Andre Brown – 21 rushes, 127 yards

**Top receivers**

- DAL – Dez Bryant – 9 receptions, 86 yards
- NYG – Rueben Randle – 3 receptions, 64 yards

Dan Bailey's 34 yard field goal with 4 seconds left in the game gave the Cowboys their sixth win of the season. With the win, the Giants' four game winning streak was snapped and the Cowboys regained the top spot of the NFC East, remaining undefeated in the division. With the victory, the Cowboys swept the Giants for the first time since 2007.

==== Week 13: vs. Oakland Raiders ====
Thanksgiving Day game

Week Thirteen: Oakland Raiders at Dallas Cowboys – Game summary

| Quarter | 1 | 2 | 3 | 4 | Total |
|---|---|---|---|---|---|
| Raiders | 7 | 14 | 0 | 3 | **24** |
| **Cowboys** | 7 | 7 | 7 | 10 | **31** |

at AT&T Stadium, Arlington, Texas

- Date: November 28
- Game time: 3:30 p.m. CST
- Game weather: Played indoors (retractable roof closed)
- Game attendance: 87,572
- Referee: Scott Green
- TV announcers (CBS): Jim Nantz and Phil Simms
- Recap, Game book

Game information

**First quarter**

- OAK – Greg Jenkins 23–yard fumble return (Sebastian Janikowski kick), 14:48. Raiders 7–0.
- DAL – DeMarco Murray 2–yard run (Dan Bailey kick), 0:43. Tied 7–7. **Drive: 1 play, 2 yards, 0:04.**

**Second quarter**

- OAK – Rashad Jennings 1–yard run (Sebastian Janikowski kick), 10:13. Raiders 14–7. **Drive: 12 plays, 79 yards, 5:30.**
- OAK – Rashad Jennings 1–yard run (Sebastian Janikowski kick), 1:56. Raiders 21–7. **Drive: 12 plays, 50 yards, 7:46.**
- DAL – DeMarco Murray 4–yard run (Dan Bailey kick), 0:10. Raiders 21–14. **Drive: 8 plays, 73 yards, 1:46.**

**Third quarter**

- DAL – Dez Bryant 4–yard pass from Tony Romo (Dan Bailey kick), 5:26. Tied 21–21. **Drive: 10 plays, 87 yards, 6:03.**

**Fourth quarter**

- DAL – DeMarco Murray 4–yard run (Dan Bailey kick), 14:20. Cowboys 28–21. **Drive: 9 plays, 65 yards, 5:20.**
- DAL – Dan Bailey 19–yard field goal, 1:56. Cowboys 31–21. **Drive: 14 plays, 79 yards, 6:43.**
- OAK – Sebastian Janikowski 45–yard field goal, 0:35. Cowboys 31–24. **Drive: 7 plays, 53 yards, 1:21.**

**Top passers**

- OAK – Matt McGloin – 18/30, 255 yards, INT
- DAL – Tony Romo – 23/32, 225 yards, TD

**Top rushers**

- OAK – Rashad Jennings – 17 rushes, 35 yards, 2 TD
- DAL – Lance Dunbar – 12 rushes, 82 yards

**Top receivers**

- OAK – Andre Holmes – 7 receptions, 136 yards
- DAL – Dez Bryant – 7 receptions, 61 yards, TD

==== Week 14: at Chicago Bears ====
Week Fourteen: Dallas Cowboys at Chicago Bears – Game summary

| Quarter | 1 | 2 | 3 | 4 | Total |
|---|---|---|---|---|---|
| Cowboys | 7 | 7 | 0 | 14 | **28** |
| **Bears** | 7 | 17 | 11 | 10 | **45** |

at Soldier Field, Chicago, Illinois

- Date: December 9
- Game time: 7:40 p.m. CST
- Game weather: 8 °F (−13 °C), partly cloudy
- Game attendance: 62,229
- Referee: Terry McAulay
- TV announcers (ESPN): Mike Tirico, Jon Gruden and Lisa Salters
- Recap, Game book

Game information

**First quarter**

- DAL – Dez Bryant 2–yard pass from Tony Romo (Dan Bailey kick), 9:02. Cowboys 7–0. **Drive: 12 plays, 75 yards, 5:58.**
- CHI – Earl Bennett 4–yard pass from Josh McCown (Robbie Gould kick), 1:35. Tied 7–7. **Drive: 12 plays, 78 yards, 7:27.**

**Second quarter**

- CHI – Josh McCown 7–yard run (Robbie Gould kick), 8:58. Bears 14–7. **Drive: 10 plays, 65 yards, 5:34.**
- DAL – Jason Witten 10–yard pass from Tony Romo (Dan Bailey kick), 5:22. Tied 14–14. **Drive: 7 plays, 68 yards, 3:36.**
- CHI – Robbie Gould 27–yard field goal, 1:33. Bears 17–14. **Drive: 9 plays, 68 yards, 3:49.**
- CHI – Alshon Jeffery 25–yard pass from Josh McCown (Robbie Gould kick), 0:10. Bears 24–14. **Drive: 5 plays, 60 yards, 0:37.**

**Third quarter**

- CHI – Robbie Gould 34–yard field goal, 12:02. Bears 27–14. **Drive: 7 plays, 58 yards, 2:58.**
- CHI – Matt Forte 4–yard pass from Josh McCown (Josh McCown–Brandon Marshall pass), 2:20. Bears 35–14. **Drive: 14 plays, 90 yards, 8:10.**

**Fourth quarter**

- CHI – Michael Bush 17–yard pass from Josh McCown (Robbie Gould kick), 14:24. Bears 42–14. **Drive: 3 plays, 58 yards, 0:58.**
- DAL – Cole Beasley 9–yard pass from Tony Romo (Dan Bailey kick), 10:52. Bears 42–21. **Drive: 8 plays, 68 yards, 3:32.**
- CHI – Robbie Gould 23–yard field goal, 3:47. Bears 45–21. **Drive: 11 plays, 49 yards, 7:05.**
- DAL – Joseph Randle 1–yard run (Dan Bailey kick), 0:06. Bears 45–28. **Drive: 11 plays, 75 yards, 3:41.**

**Top passers**

- DAL – Tony Romo – 11/20, 104 yards, 3 TD
- CHI – Josh McCown – 27/36, 348 yards, 4 TD

**Top rushers**

- DAL – DeMarco Murray – 18 rushes, 146 yards
- CHI – Matt Forte – 20 rushes, 102 yards

**Top receivers**

- DAL – Terrance Williams – 2 receptions, 36 yards
- CHI – Brandon Marshall – 6 receptions, 100 yards

==== Week 15: vs. Green Bay Packers ====
Week Fifteen: Green Bay Packers at Dallas Cowboys – Game summary

| Quarter | 1 | 2 | 3 | 4 | Total |
|---|---|---|---|---|---|
| **Packers** | 3 | 0 | 14 | 20 | **37** |
| Cowboys | 13 | 13 | 3 | 7 | **36** |

at AT&T Stadium, Arlington, Texas

- Date: December 15
- Game time: 3:25 p.m. CST
- Game weather: Played indoors (retractable roof closed)
- Game attendance: 91,054
- Referee: Walt Coleman
- TV announcers (Fox): Joe Buck, Troy Aikman and Pam Oliver
- Recap, Game book

Game information

**First quarter**

- DAL – Dan Bailey 47–yard field goal, 10:56. Cowboys 3–0. **Drive: 8 plays, 52 yards, 4:04.**
- GB – Mason Crosby 57–yard field goal, 7:40. Tied 3–3. **Drive: 6 plays, 41 yards, 3:16.**
- DAL – Dan Bailey 23–yard field goal, 4:52. Cowboys 6–3. **Drive: 7 plays, 75 yards, 2:48.**
- DAL – Jason Witten 25–yard pass from Tony Romo (Dan Bailey kick), 0:28. Cowboys 13–3. **Drive: 4 plays, 65 yards, 1:57.**

**Second quarter**

- DAL – Dan Bailey 43–yard field goal, 5:54. Cowboys 16–3. **Drive: 8 plays, 48 yards, 3:26.**
- DAL – Dan Bailey 50–yard field goal, 3:45. Cowboys 19–3. **Drive: 4 plays, -11 yards, 0:53.**
- DAL – DeMarco Murray 1–yard run (Dan Bailey kick), 0:24. Cowboys 26–3. **Drive: 6 plays, 75 yards, 1:35.**

**Third quarter**

- GB – Jordy Nelson 13–yard pass from Matt Flynn (Mason Crosby kick), 13:08. Cowboys 26–10. **Drive: 4 plays, 80 yards, 1:52.**
- DAL – Dan Bailey 50–yard field goal, 6:33. Cowboys 29–10. **Drive: 11 plays, 48 yards, 6:35.**
- GB – Andrew Quarless 3–yard pass from Matt Flynn (Mason Crosby kick), 1:09. Cowboys 29–17. **Drive: 12 plays, 80 yards, 5:24.**

**Fourth quarter**

- GB – James Starks 11–yard pass from Matt Flynn (Mason Crosby kick), 12:47. Cowboys 29–24. **Drive: 5 plays, 22 yards, 2:14.**
- DAL – Dez Bryant 5–yard pass from Tony Romo (Dan Bailey kick), 7:55. Cowboys 36–24. **Drive: 10 plays, 80 yards, 4:52.**
- GB – James Jones 3–yard pass from Matt Flynn (Mason Crosby kick), 4:17. Cowboys 36–31. **Drive: 10 plays, 80 yards, 3:38.**
- GB – Eddie Lacy 1–yard run (pass failed), 1:31. Packers 37–36. **Drive: 7 plays, 50 yards, 1:15.**

**Top passers**

- GB – Matt Flynn – 26/39, 299 yards, 4 TD, INT
- DAL – Tony Romo – 29/48, 358 yards, 2 TD, 2 INT

**Top rushers**

- GB – Eddie Lacy – 21 rushes, 141 yards, TD
- DAL – DeMarco Murray – 18 rushes, 134 yards, TD

**Top receivers**

- GB – Jarrett Boykin – 6 receptions, 83 yards
- DAL – Dez Bryant – 11 receptions, 153 yards, TD

With the Packers coming off of their first win since the injury of Aaron Rodgers, the Cowboys lead 26–3 at halftime. In the second half of the game, the Packers managed a dramatic comeback that was helped by the mistake-prone Cowboys. The Packers scored the game-winning touchdown with almost a minute left in the game. Tony Romo tried to rally back and give the Cowboys a win, but threw an interception near the 50-yard line that sealed their fate. Controversy followed the game for the Cowboys giving up a 23-point halftime lead and the play-calling of the coaching staff.

==== Week 16: at Washington Redskins ====
Week Sixteen: Dallas Cowboys at Washington Redskins – Game summary

| Quarter | 1 | 2 | 3 | 4 | Total |
|---|---|---|---|---|---|
| **Cowboys** | 7 | 7 | 0 | 10 | **24** |
| Redskins | 3 | 3 | 14 | 3 | **23** |

at FedExField, Landover, Maryland

- Date: December 22
- Game time: 12:00 p.m. CST
- Game weather: 65 °F (18 °C), rain
- Game attendance: 80,411
- Referee: Bill Leavy
- TV announcers (Fox): Kevin Burkhardt, John Lynch and Erin Andrews
- Recap, Game book

Game information

**First quarter**

- DAL – DeMarco Murray 3–yard run (Dan Bailey kick), 12:49. Cowboys 7–0. **Drive: 2 plays, 3 yards, 0:11.**
- WAS – Kai Forbath 36–yard field goal, 4:15. Cowboys 7–3. **Drive: 7 plays, 19 yards, 3:53.**

**Second quarter**

- WAS – Kai Forbath 22–yard field goal, 7:36. Cowboys 7–6. **Drive: 10 plays, 75 yards, 7:15.**
- DAL – Dez Bryant 14–yard pass from Tony Romo (Dan Bailey kick), 4:37. Cowboys 14–6. **Drive: 6 plays, 93 yards, 2:59.**

**Third quarter**

- WAS – Pierre Garçon 8–yard pass from Kirk Cousins (Kai Forbath kick), 9:09. Cowboys 14–13. **Drive: 7 plays, 33 yards, 4:20.**
- WAS – Alfred Morris 4–yard run (Kai Forbath kick), 3:41. Redskins 20–14. **Drive: 7 plays, 47 yards, 3:13.**

**Fourth quarter**

- WAS – Kai Forbath 47–yard field goal, 14:56. Redskins 23–14. **Drive: 7 plays, 23 yards, 2:55.**
- DAL – Dan Bailey 25–yard field goal, 6:09. Redskins 23–17. **Drive: 15 plays, 73 yards, 8:47.**
- DAL – DeMarco Murray 10–yard pass from Tony Romo (Dan Bailey kick), 1:08. Cowboys 24–23. **Drive: 9 plays, 87 yards, 2:31.**

**Top passers**

- DAL – Tony Romo – 17/27, 226 yards, 2 TD, INT
- WAS – Kirk Cousins – 21/36, 197 yards, TD, INT

**Top rushers**

- DAL – DeMarco Murray – 22 rushes, 96 yards, TD
- WAS – Alfred Morris – 24 rushes, 88 yards, TD

**Top receivers**

- DAL – Terrance Williams – 4 receptions, 84 yards
- WAS – Pierre Garçon – 11 receptions, 144 yards, TD

After the loss to the Packers the week before, the Cowboys managed to hold the Redskins to only two field goals to lead 14–6 at halftime. In the third quarter, Kirk Cousins threw two touchdown passes to give the Redskins a 20–14 lead at the end of the 3rd. The Redskins extended their lead to 23–14 after another field goal. The Cowboys, in an attempt to not repeat the mistakes of the previous week, sent Dan Bailey out to kick a field goal to trail 23–17 in the 4th. At the 3:29 mark, the Cowboys went back to work to start at their own 13 yard line. Romo led the Cowboys downfield thanks in large part to a Terrance Williams 51 yard catch and then a Dez Bryant catch and run for 17 yards to set up first and goal at the Redskins' 4 yard line. DeMarco Murray carried the ball for all three plays (+3, no gain, −9). Facing 4th and goal at the Washington 10 yard line, Romo climbed the pocket and fired a pass to DeMarco Murray in the end zone to tie the game 23–23. With the extra point good, the Cowboys led 24–23 with 1:01 remaining in the game. Washington started their drive on their own 13 yard line after a 10-yard illegal block penalty negated what would have been a 21-yard return (to the Washington 23). Kirk Cousins and co. could not sustain their drive, totaling 4 yards on four passing attempts. The Redskins turned the ball over on downs with 40 seconds remaining in the game. Lining up in the victory formation, Tony Romo was able to kneel the ball down and run the clock out. With the win, the Cowboys advanced to 5-0 in the NFC East and kept their playoff hopes alive to set up a do-or-die at home versus the Eagles.

Romo was seen limping through most of the fourth quarter after rolling out of what would have been a sack by Redskins linebacker Rob Jackson. The Cowboys later confirmed injury reports of Romo suffering a herniated disc in his lower back. Despite statements that he would be ready to face Nick Foles and the Philadelphia Eagles for the NFC East Championship, Romo was placed on injured reserve. The Cowboys tried to delay surgery by administering an epidural injection two days prior to the anticipated game, but it was decided Romo needed the surgery and ended his season.

==== Week 17: vs. Philadelphia Eagles ====
Week Seventeen: Philadelphia Eagles at Dallas Cowboys – Game summary

| Quarter | 1 | 2 | 3 | 4 | Total |
|---|---|---|---|---|---|
| **Eagles** | 3 | 14 | 0 | 7 | **24** |
| Cowboys | 0 | 10 | 6 | 6 | **22** |

at AT&T Stadium, Arlington, Texas

- Date: December 29
- Game time: 7:30 p.m. CST
- Game weather: Played indoors (retractable roof closed)
- Game attendance: 91,166
- Referee: Gene Steratore
- TV announcers (NBC): Al Michaels, Cris Collinsworth and Michele Tafoya
- Recap, Game book

Game information

**First quarter**

- PHI – Alex Henery 47–yard field goal, 7:07. Eagles 3–0. **Drive: 7 plays, 48 yards, 3:35.**

**Second quarter**

- PHI – LeSean McCoy 3–yard pass from Nick Foles (Alex Henery kick), 14:13. Eagles 10–0. **Drive: 10 plays, 88 yards, 4:20.**
- DAL – Gavin Escobar 17–yard pass from Kyle Orton (Dan Bailey kick), 8:16. Eagles 10–7. **Drive: 6 plays, 66 yards, 2:51.**
- PHI – Brent Celek 14–yard pass from Nick Foles (Alex Henery kick), 1:19. Eagles 17–7. **Drive: 2 plays, 49 yards, 0:34.**
- DAL – Dan Bailey 44–yard field goal, 0:18. Eagles 17–10. **Drive: 8 plays, 54 yards, 1:01.**

**Third quarter**

- DAL – Dan Bailey 43–yard field goal, 8:59. Eagles 17–13. **Drive: 9 plays, 41 yards, 4:50.**
- DAL – Dan Bailey 36–yard field goal, 5:38. Eagles 17–16. **Drive: 4 plays, 2 yards, 2:06.**

**Fourth quarter**

- PHI – Bryce Brown 6–yard run (Alex Henery kick), 6:09. Eagles 24–16. **Drive: 11 plays, 60 yards, 5:37.**
- DAL – Dez Bryant 32–yard pass from Kyle Orton (pass failed), 3:50. Eagles 24–22. **Drive: 6 plays, 80 yards, 2:19.**

**Top passers**

- PHI – Nick Foles – 17/26, 263 yards, 2 TD
- DAL – Kyle Orton – 30/46, 358 yards, 2 TD, 2 INT

**Top rushers**

- PHI – LeSean McCoy – 27 rushes, 131 yards
- DAL – DeMarco Murray – 17 rushes, 48 yards

**Top receivers**

- PHI – Brent Celek – 3 receptions, 71 yards, TD
- DAL – Jason Witten – 12 receptions, 135 yards

The loss caused the Cowboys once again to miss out on the playoffs and gave them a 2–12 record in Week 17 games since 2000.

== Standings ==
=== Division ===
NFC East
| | W | L | T | PCT | DIV | CONF | PF | PA | STK |
|---|---|---|---|---|---|---|---|---|---|
| ^{(3)} Philadelphia Eagles | 10 | 6 | 0 | .625 | 4–2 | 9–3 | 442 | 382 | W2 |
| Dallas Cowboys | 8 | 8 | 0 | .500 | 5–1 | 7–5 | 439 | 432 | L1 |
| New York Giants | 7 | 9 | 0 | .438 | 3–3 | 6–6 | 294 | 383 | W2 |
| Washington Redskins | 3 | 13 | 0 | .188 | 0–6 | 1–11 | 334 | 478 | L8 |

=== Conference ===
NFC
| # | Team | Division | W | L | T | PCT | DIV | CONF | SOS | SOV | STK |
|---|---|---|---|---|---|---|---|---|---|---|---|
Division winners
| 1 | Seattle Seahawks | West | 13 | 3 | 0 | .813 | 4–2 | 10–2 | .490 | .445 | W1 |
| 2 | Carolina Panthers | South | 12 | 4 | 0 | .750 | 5–1 | 9–3 | .494 | .451 | W3 |
| 3 | Philadelphia Eagles | East | 10 | 6 | 0 | .625 | 4–2 | 9–3 | .453 | .391 | W2 |
| 4 | Green Bay Packers | North | 8 | 7 | 1 | .531 | 3–2–1 | 6–5–1 | .453 | .371 | W1 |
Wild cards
| 5 | San Francisco 49ers | West | 12 | 4 | 0 | .750 | 5–1 | 9–3 | .494 | .414 | W6 |
| 6 | New Orleans Saints | South | 11 | 5 | 0 | .688 | 5–1 | 9–3 | .516 | .455 | W1 |
Did not qualify for the postseason
| 7 | Arizona Cardinals | West | 10 | 6 | 0 | .625 | 2–4 | 6–6 | .531 | .444 | L1 |
| 8 (Note: Chicago defeated Dallas head-to-head (Week 14, 45–28).) | Chicago Bears | North | 8 | 8 | 0 | .500 | 2–4 | 4–8 | .465 | .469 | L2 |
| 9 | Dallas Cowboys | East | 8 | 8 | 0 | .500 | 5–1 | 7–5 | .484 | .363 | L1 |
| 10 (Note: The NY Giants and Detroit finished with a better conference record than St. Louis.) (Note: The NY Giants defeated Detroit head-to-head (Week 16, 23–20 (OT)).) | New York Giants | East | 7 | 9 | 0 | .438 | 3–3 | 6–6 | .520 | .366 | W2 |
| 11 (Note: Detroit finished with a better conference record than St. Louis.) | Detroit Lions | North | 7 | 9 | 0 | .438 | 4–2 | 6–6 | .457 | .402 | L4 |
| 12 | St. Louis Rams | West | 7 | 9 | 0 | .438 | 1–5 | 4–8 | .551 | .446 | L1 |
| 13 | Minnesota Vikings | North | 5 | 10 | 1 | .344 | 2–3–1 | 4–7–1 | .512 | .450 | W1 |
| 14 (Note: Atlanta finished with a better conference record than Tampa Bay.) | Atlanta Falcons | South | 4 | 12 | 0 | .250 | 1–5 | 3–9 | .553 | .313 | L2 |
| 15 | Tampa Bay Buccaneers | South | 4 | 12 | 0 | .250 | 1–5 | 2–10 | .574 | .391 | L3 |
| 16 | Washington Redskins | East | 3 | 13 | 0 | .188 | 0–6 | 1–11 | .516 | .438 | L8 |
Tiebreakers (Note: When breaking ties for three or more teams under the NFL's rules, they are first broken within divisions, then comparing only the highest-ranked remaining team from each division.)
