= Bruce Carter (American football) =

American football player (born 1988)

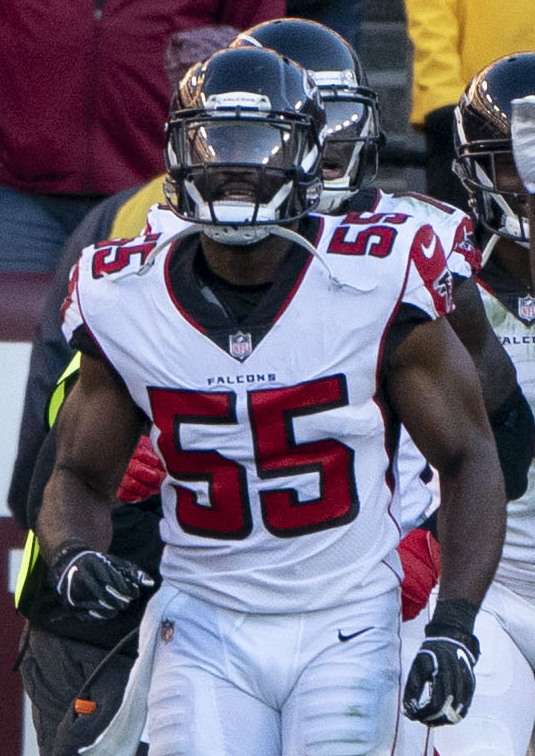
- Carter with the Atlanta Falcons in 2018

No. 50, 54, 55
- Position: Linebacker

Personal information
- Born: February 19, 1988 (age 38); Havelock, North Carolina, U.S.
- Listed height: 6 ft 2 in (1.88 m)
- Listed weight: 240 lb (109 kg)

Career information
- High school: Havelock
- College: North Carolina
- NFL draft: 2011: 2nd round, 40th overall pick

Career history
- Dallas Cowboys (2011–2014); Tampa Bay Buccaneers (2015); New York Jets (2016–2017); Atlanta Falcons (2018)

Awards and highlights
- 2× Second-team All-ACC (2009, 2010)

Career NFL statistics
- Total tackles: 332
- Sacks: 5
- Interceptions: 5
- Defensive touchdowns: 1
- Stats at Pro Football Reference

Bruce Edward Carter (born February 19, 1988) is an American former professional football player who was a linebacker in the National Football League (NFL). He played college football for the North Carolina Tar Heels and was selected by the Dallas Cowboys in the second round of the 2011 NFL draft.

== Early life ==
Carter attended Havelock High School in Havelock, North Carolina. He played quarterback, safety and running back for the football team. As a senior, he rushed for 1,063 yards with 15 touchdowns as a running back and threw for 585 yards and five touchdowns as a quarterback.

Considered a three-star recruit by Rivals.com, Carter was listed as the No. 33 safety prospect in the nation.

== College career ==
=== Freshman year ===
Carter was converted to linebacker in college. In the Tar Heels' season opener, against James Madison, Carter got his first blocked punt. The football was recovered in the end zone by a fellow Tar Heel for a touchdown. Carter started his first game as a Tar Heel in the game against East Carolina, he garnered four tackles during the game. As a freshman in 2007 Carter started seven of 12 games, recording 25 tackles.

=== Sophomore year ===
As a sophomore in 2008 Carter started all 13 games at outside linebacker. In the game against Rutgers, Carter intercepted a pass and returned it 66 yards for a touchdown, this was the first touchdown of his career. In the Tar Heels' game against Miami, Carter blocked one punt. The blocked punt proved to be crucial, as the Tar Heels drove 56 yards down the field and scored after the punt was blocked. One of Bruce Carter's best games of his sophomore season was the game against Connecticut. The blocking of three punts in one game earned Carter the ACC record for most punts blocked in a single game. In that game he recorded three blocked punts, all of which occurred during the second quarter of the game. In the Tar Heels' loss to the Virginia Cavaliers, Carter blocked a Cavalier field goal attempt. He finished the season with 68 tackles, five sacks, an interception, which was returned for a touchdown, and a nation leading five blocked kicks.

=== Junior year ===
Carter started all 13 games as an outside linebacker. Carter tipped a punt in the Tar Heel's game against the Citadel. In the Tar Heels' game against Georgia Southern, Carter intercepted a pass and returned it 48 yards for a touchdown, this was Carter's second career touchdown. As a junior in 2009, Carter has 48 tackles, a sack, and an interception. Carter earned a career-high 13 tackles in the game against NC State. Carter was voted to Second-team All-ACC. This was Carter's only season where he did not record a blocked punt.

=== Senior year ===
Carter returned an interception 55 yards for a touchdown in the third game of the season against Rutgers. In that game Carter also recorded a blocked punt and seven tackles. Carter's senior season was cut short due to a knee injury, which dropped his draft stock. He sustained the injury during the game against NC State. He would miss the last two games of the season against Duke and the 2010 Music City Bowl, which was played against Tennessee Volunteers.

He was a finalist for the 2010 Butkus Award, but lost to Von Miller of Texas A&M. He finished his final season as a Tar Heel with 57 tackles, 3.5 tackles for loss, 2.5 sacks, and one forced fumble. Carter was again voted to Second-team All-ACC.

== Professional career ==
Pre-draft measurables
Height	Weight	Arm length	Hand span	Wingspan	Bench press
6 ft 1 1/2 in (1.87 m)	241 lb (109 kg)	32 5/8 in (0.83 m)	9 1/4 in (0.23 m)	6 ft 5 3/4 in (1.97 m)	25 reps
All values from NFL Combine

=== Dallas Cowboys ===
==== 2011 season ====
Carter was considered one of the top linebacker prospects for the 2011 NFL draft. Carter was projected as a first-round draft pick before sustaining an ACL injury in his left knee during his senior season. The Dallas Cowboys selected him in the second round (40th overall) of the 2011 NFL draft.

He spent his rookie season recovering from the injury. On October 29, he was activated from the non-football injury list to the Cowboys active roster, taking the spot of the waived Tashard Choice. His participation was mostly limited to special teams, playing only a total of 41 defensive snaps.

==== 2012 season ====
Entering the 2012 season the team decided not to resign Keith Brooking and Bradie James, because they considered Carter to be ready to start at inside linebacker next to Sean Lee, after playing outside linebacker for most of his college career.

The Cowboys also signed Dan Connor as a free agent to compete with Carter and to protect themselves in case he couldn't earn a starting role. That potential competition never materialized, because Carter would end up having a break out year, even expanding his role after Lee was placed on injured reserve in October. He finished second on the team with 70 tackles, despite being placed on injured reserve for the final five games, after dislocating his left elbow on Thanksgiving Day.

==== 2013 season ====
In 2013, defensive coordinator Monte Kiffin was hired to change the defense to a 4-3 alignment, so he was switched to weakside linebacker, which was the same role in the Tampa 2 defense made famous by hall of famer Derrick Brooks. Although he was seen as a natural fit and there were high expectations placed on him, he struggled in preseason, where he started being platooned with Ernie Sims. These difficulties carried on into the regular season and after a poor performance against the San Diego Chargers, he was benched for the first time at any level. After two games he regained his starter role over Sims and finished with 96 tackles (third on the team) and 2 sacks.

==== 2014 season ====
In 2014, he was moved to strongside linebacker, so he could line behind the three-technique right defensive tackle position and be free to make plays. He suffered a right quadriceps injury against the New Orleans Saints and was lost for three games. Although his playing time was reduced in November, losing his starting role after the game against the Arizona Cardinals, he would finish strong while concentrating on the nickel defense and special teams, finishing with 68 tackles, 5 interceptions (led the team), 8 passes defensed and a blocked punt.

=== Tampa Bay Buccaneers ===
On March 11, 2015, he signed a four-year contract with the Tampa Bay Buccaneers. Although he was projected to start at middle linebacker, he was moved to sam linebacker, after rookie Kwon Alexander outperformed him in training camp. He was used mostly as a backup (only 3 starts), finishing with 47 tackles, 2 sacks and 2 passes defensed. On March 8, 2016, he was waived in a salary cap move.

=== New York Jets ===
Carter signed a one-year contract with the New York Jets on April 2, 2016. He appeared in 13 games, registering 13 defensive tackles and 5 special teams tackles.

On May 4, 2017, Carter re-signed with the Jets on a one-year contract. He played in 14 games.

=== Atlanta Falcons ===
On September 25, 2018, Carter was signed by the Atlanta Falcons.

On February 11, 2019, Carter signed a one-year contract extension with the Falcons. He was released on August 31, 2019.

== NFL career statistics ==
Legend
**Bold**	Career high

=== Regular season ===
Year	Team	Games		Tackles					Interceptions					Fumbles			
Year	Team	GP	GS	Cmb	Solo	Ast	Sck	TFL	Int	Yds	TD	Lng	PD	FF	FR	Yds	TD
2011	DAL	10	0	8	5	3	0.0	0	0	0	0	0	1	0	0	0	0
2012	DAL	11	11	70	51	19	0.0	**9**	0	0	0	0	2	0	0	0	0
2013	DAL	**15**	**13**	**96**	**73**	**23**	**2.0**	5	0	0	0	0	3	0	0	0	0
2014	DAL	13	8	68	48	20	1.0	5	**5**	**72**	**1**	**35**	**8**	0	0	0	0
2015	TAM	14	3	47	30	17	**2.0**	3	0	0	0	0	2	0	0	0	0
2016	NYJ	13	1	16	9	7	0.0	2	0	0	0	0	1	0	0	0	0
2017	NYJ	14	0	6	2	4	0.0	0	0	0	0	0	0	0	0	0	0
2018	ATL	11	0	21	16	5	0.0	0	0	0	0	0	0	0	0	0	0
		101	36	332	234	98	5.0	24	5	72	1	35	17	0	0	0	0

=== Playoffs ===
Year	Team	Games		Tackles					Interceptions					Fumbles			
Year	Team	GP	GS	Cmb	Solo	Ast	Sck	TFL	Int	Yds	TD	Lng	PD	FF	FR	Yds	TD
2014	DAL	**2**	**2**	**14**	**9**	**5**	0.0	**1**	0	0	0	0	**3**	0	0	0	0
		2	2	14	9	5	0.0	1	0	0	0	0	3	0	0	0	0
