= Mr. Colorado Basketball =

Top high school boy basketball player

The Mr. Colorado Basketball honor recognizes the top boys’ high school basketball player in the state of Colorado. The trademarked award has been presented annually since 1993 by The Denver Post to the player of the year selected from the best players in each of the five high school divisions.

== Award winners ==
Year	Player	High school	College	NBA/ABA draft
1993	Chauncey Billups	George Washington	Colorado	1997 NBA draft: 1st Rnd, 3rd overall by the Boston Celtics
1994	Chauncey Billups	George Washington	Colorado	1997 NBA Draft: 1st Rnd, 3rd overall by the Boston Celtics
1995	Chauncey Billups	George Washington	Colorado	1997 NBA Draft: 1st Rnd, 3rd overall by the Boston Celtics
1996	Chris Crosby	Chatfield	Washington State	
1997	Tom Starkey	Green Mountain	New Mexico, transferred to Denver	
1998	Nick Mohr	Columbine	Colorado	
1999	Brian Greene	Horizon	Colorado State	
2000	Blair Wilson	Westminster	Colorado	
2001	Patrick Simpson	George Washington	SMU	
2002	Franklin Ryk	Rocky Mountain	Colorado School of Mines	
2003	Nick Fazekas	Ralston Valley	Nevada	2007 NBA draft: 2nd Rnd, 34th overall by the Dallas Mavericks
2004	Sean Ogirri	Denver East	Wichita State, transferred to Wyoming	
2005	Andrew Brown	Heritage	Lafayette College	
2006	Matt Bouldin	ThunderRidge	Gonzaga	
2007	Levi Knutson	Arapahoe	Colorado	
2008	Reggie Jackson	Palmer	Boston College	2011 NBA draft: 1st Rnd, 24th overall by the Oklahoma City Thunder
2009	Bud Thomas	Regis Jesuit	Mercer	
2010	Bud Thomas	Regis Jesuit	Mercer	
2011	Riley Grabau	Boulder	Wyoming	
2012	Josh Scott	Lewis-Palmer	Colorado	
2013	Dominique Collier	Denver East	Colorado	
2014	Dominique Collier	Denver East	Colorado	
2015	Brian Carey	Denver East	Texas Southern	
2016	De'Ron Davis	Overland	Indiana	
2017	Colbey Ross	Eaglecrest	Pepperdine	
2018	Sam Masten	Rock Canyon	Northern Colorado	
2019	Kenny Foster	Smoky Hill	Wyoming	
2023	D'Aundre Samuels	Denver East	Nebraska–Kearney	
2024	Cole Scherer	Valor Christian	Eastern Washington	
2025	Cole Scherer	Valor Christian	Eastern Washington	
2026	Eric Fiedler	Regis Jesuit	Colorado State	

=== Schools with multiple winners ===
School	Number of awards	Years
Denver East	5	2003, 2013, 2014, 2015, 2023
George Washington	4	1993, 1994, 1995, 2001
Regis Jesuit	3	2009, 2010, 2026
Valor Christian	2	2024, 2025
