= Dan Skipper =

American football player (born 1994)

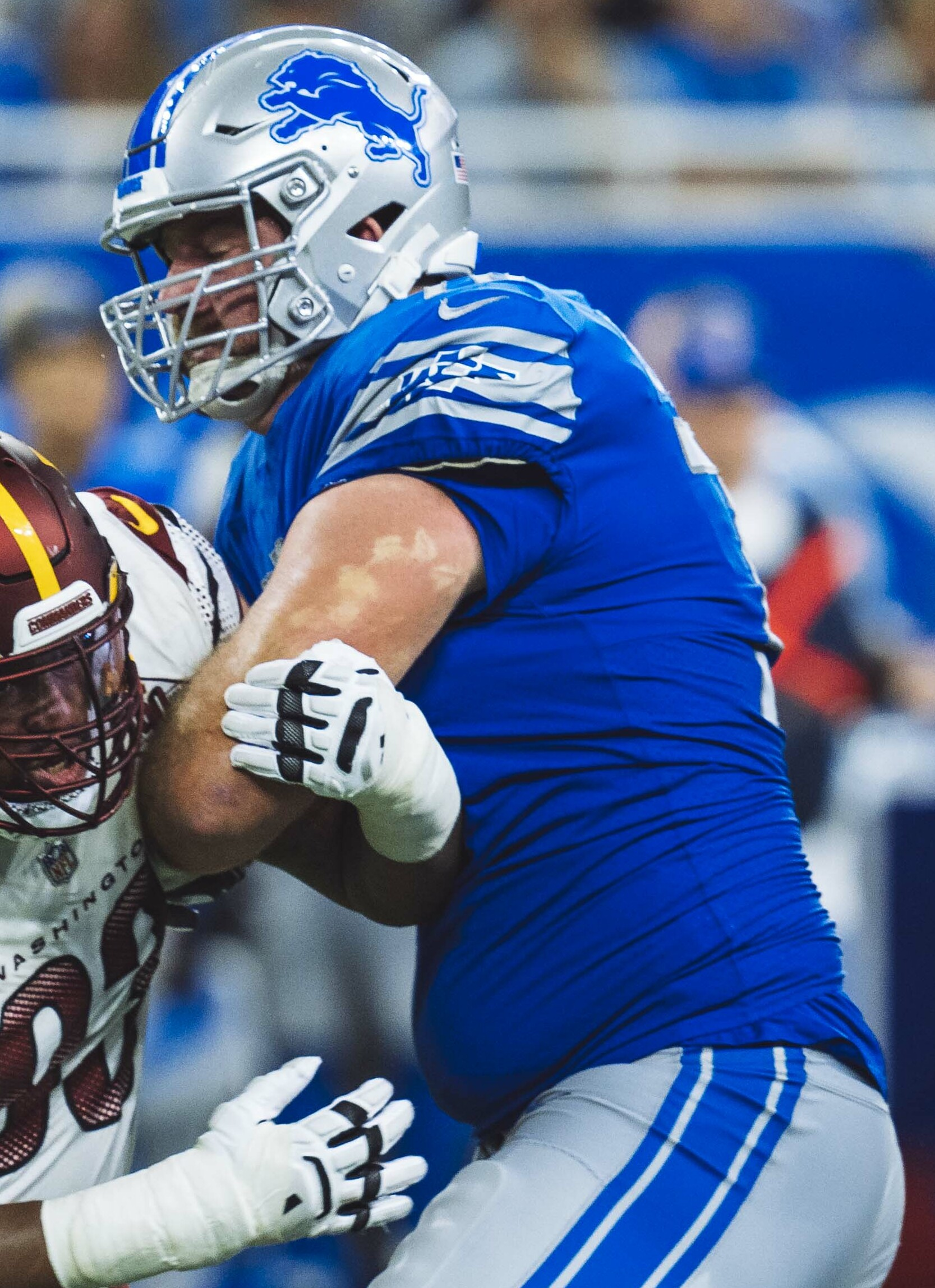
- Skipper with the Detroit Lions in 2022

Detroit Lions
- Title: Offensive assistant

Personal information
- Born: September 20, 1994 (age 32); Arvada, Colorado, U.S.
- Listed height: 6 ft 10 in (2.08 m)
- Listed weight: 334 lb (151 kg)

Career information
- Position: Offensive tackle
- High school: Ralston Valley (Arvada, Colorado)
- College: Arkansas (2013–2016)
- NFL draft: 2017: undrafted

Career history

Playing
- Dallas Cowboys (2017)*; Detroit Lions (2017); Denver Broncos (2018)*; New England Patriots (2018–2019)*; Houston Texans (2019); Detroit Lions (2019–2020); Las Vegas Raiders (2021)*; Detroit Lions (2021–2022); Indianapolis Colts (2023)*; Detroit Lions (2023–2025)
- * Offseason or practice squad member only

Coaching
- Detroit Lions (2026–present) Offensive assistant

Awards and highlights
- Super Bowl champion (LIII); First-team All-SEC (2016); Second-team All-SEC (2015); Freshman All-American (2014)

Career NFL statistics
- Games played: 69
- Games started: 16
- Receptions: 2
- Receiving yards: 13
- Receiving touchdowns: 1
- Stats at Pro Football Reference

Daniel Skipper (born September 20, 1994), also known by the nickname "Skip", is an American former professional football player who was an offensive tackle in the National Football League (NFL). He played college football for the Arkansas Razorbacks. At 6 feet 10 inches tall, Skipper is one of the tallest players in NFL history. He currently serves as an offensive assistant for the Detroit Lions of the NFL.

== Early life ==
Skipper was born in Arvada, Colorado, a suburb of Denver. He attended Ralston Valley High School. As a junior, he contributed to the team having a 10–2 record and reaching the quarterfinal round of the state playoffs.

As a senior, he helped get Ralston Valley to the state semifinals, while receiving 5A all-state honors. He received multiple scholarship offers for athletics only, ultimately choosing the University of Arkansas.

== College career ==
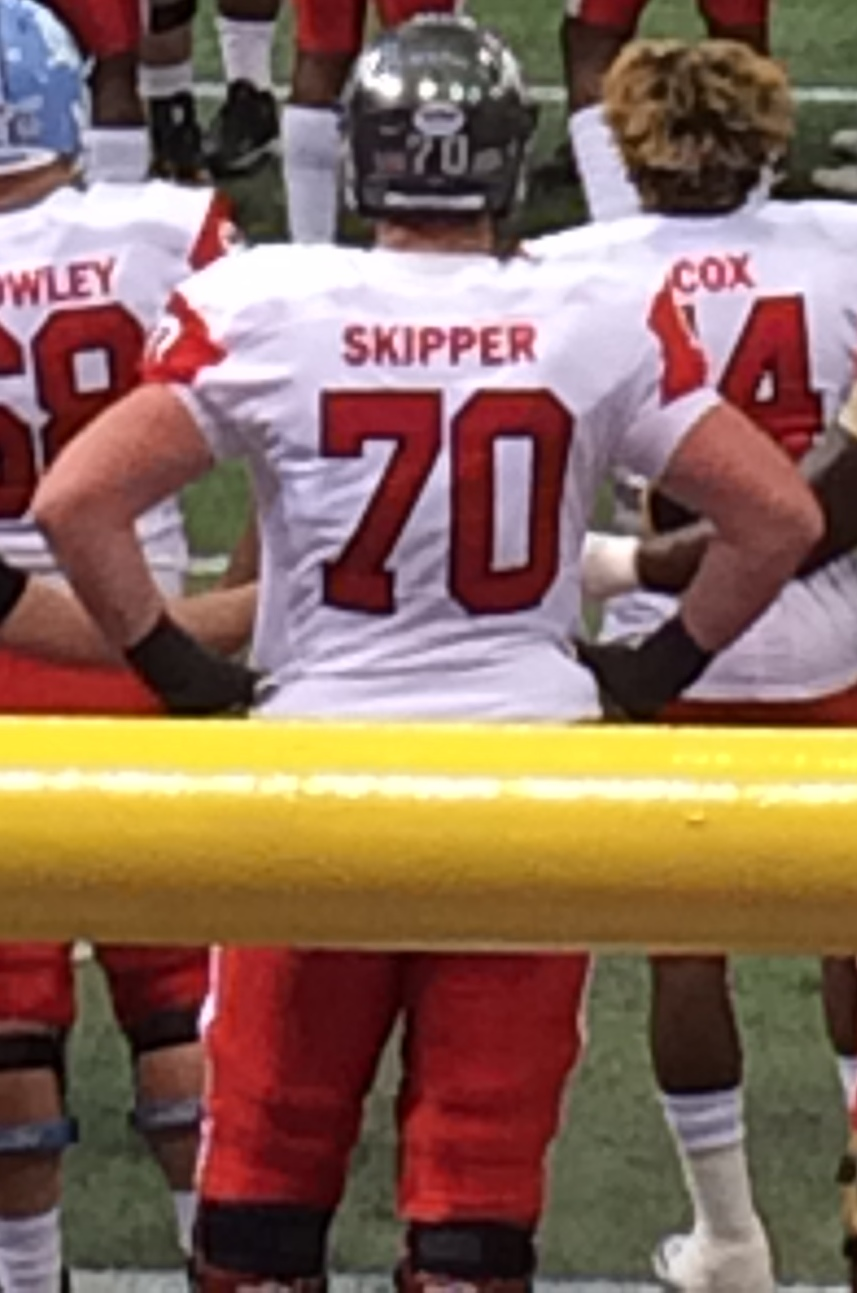
Skipper in January 2017

As a freshman, he appeared in all 12 games and started the last eight at right offensive guard. He blocked a single-season school record three field goal attempts. He contributed to Alex Collins becoming the second freshman in school history and 10th true freshman in Southeastern Conference (SEC) history to rush for 1,000 yards. Collins and Jonathan Williams also became the second Razorback running back duo to each reach at least 900 rushing yards in the same season. Skipper was recognized as a Freshman All-American.

As a sophomore, he started all 13 games at left tackle, was a part of an offensive line that led the SEC with 14 sacks allowed and earned an Associated Press All-SEC honorable-mention. He contributed for Collins and Williams to be the only FBS teammates to each rush for 1,000-plus yards in the 2014 season.

As a junior, he started all 13 games at right tackle and was named second-team All-SEC. He contributed to running back Collins becoming the third player in SEC history with three straight 1,000-yard campaigns to begin his career.

As a senior, he started all 13 games at left tackle and made the All-SEC team of the Coaches Poll, ESPN, Phil Steele, Athlon Sports, Lindy's Sports and Sporting News. He contributed to Rawleigh Williams III winning the SEC regular rushing title with 1,326 yards and Austin Allen throwing for a conference-best 3,430 yards.

He appeared in 51 games and finished his career with 47 straight starts (second-longest streak in school history), 7 blocked field goal attempts on special teams (school record) and became one of six offensive linemen in program history to earn All-SEC honors twice.

== Professional career ==
=== Pre-draft ===
Pre-draft measurables
Height	Weight	Arm length	Hand span	Wingspan	40-yard dash	10-yard split	20-yard split	20-yard shuttle	Three-cone drill	Vertical jump	Broad jump	Bench press
6 ft 9 5/8 in (2.07 m)	309 lb (140 kg)	33 3/8 in (0.85 m)	10 1/2 in (0.27 m)	6 ft 8 1/8 in (2.04 m)	5.26 s	1.78 s	3.06 s	4.94 s	7.50 s	26.0 in (0.66 m)	8 ft 1 in (2.46 m)	19 reps
All values from NFL Combine/Pro Day

Skipper went undrafted during the 2017 NFL draft. It was speculated that he went undrafted due to a chronic blood condition that was discovered during prospect evaluations. After not receiving a contract as an undrafted free agent, Skipper received an invitation to attend the Dallas Cowboys' rookie minicamp as a tryout candidate.

=== Dallas Cowboys ===
Skipper was signed as an undrafted free agent by the Cowboys after the 2017 NFL draft on May 16, 2017. Throughout training camp, he competed for a roster spot against Emmett Cleary, Clay DeBord, Ruben Carter, and Kadeem Edwards. On September 2, he was waived by the Cowboys and was re-signed to the team's practice squad the next day. Skipper was released by Dallas on September 20.

=== Detroit Lions (first stint) ===
On September 25, 2017, Skipper was signed to the Detroit Lions' practice squad. He was promoted to the active roster on October 26. On October 31, Skipper was waived in order for the Lions to sign Don Barclay and was re-signed to the practice squad. He signed a reserve/future contract with the Lions on January 1, 2018.

On September 1, 2018, Skipper was waived by the Lions and re-signed to the practice squad the next day. He was released on September 5.

=== Denver Broncos ===
On November 27, 2018, Skipper was signed to the Denver Broncos' practice squad.

=== New England Patriots ===
On January 8, 2019, Skipper was signed to the New England Patriots practice squad. Skipper was a part of the Patriots Super Bowl LIII championship team when they defeated the Los Angeles Rams 13–3. He signed a reserve/future contract with the Patriots on February 5. Skipper was released by New England during final roster cuts on August 31. He was re-signed to the practice squad the following day.

=== Houston Texans ===
On October 16, 2019, Skipper was signed by the Houston Texans off the Patriots practice squad. He was waived by the Texans on November 11.

=== Detroit Lions (second stint) ===
On November 12, 2019, Skipper was claimed off waivers by the Detroit Lions. He was waived on November 22 and subsequently re-signed to the practice squad. Skipper was promoted to the active roster on December 14.

Skipper was waived/injured by the Lions during final roster cuts on September 5, 2020, and subsequently reverted to the team's injured reserve list the next day. He was waived with an injury settlement on September 14. Skipper was re-signed to the Lions practice squad on October 21. He was elevated to the active roster on November 14 and December 12 for the team's Weeks 10 and 14 games against the Washington Football Team and Green Bay Packers, and reverted to the practice squad after each game. On December 19, Skipper was promoted to the active roster. For the team's Week 17 game against the Minnesota Vikings, Skipper played nine downs at defensive tackle.

On August 30, 2021, Skipper was waived/injured by the Lions and placed on injured reserve. He was released by Detroit on September 6.

=== Las Vegas Raiders ===
On October 13, 2021, Skipper was signed to the Las Vegas Raiders' practice squad. He was released by the Raiders on November 3.

=== Detroit Lions (third stint) ===
On November 19, 2021, Skipper was signed to the Detroit Lions' practice squad. He signed a reserve/future contract with the Lions on January 10, 2022.

On August 30, 2022, Skipper was released by the Lions and signed to the practice squad the next day. This was an emotional moment for the HBO show, Hard Knocks, when Skipper asked "What could I have done different?". On September 18, in a Week 2 matchup versus the Washington Commanders, Skipper started at guard, a position he had not played since freshman year in college. In the locker room after the Lions' 36–27 win, head coach Dan Campbell recognized "Skip" for his performance, a video clip of which went viral. He was signed to the active roster on October 1. Skipper appeared in a career-high 16 games, while starting in five contests as an injury fill-in. He was not re-signed after the season.

=== Indianapolis Colts ===
On August 1, 2023, Skipper signed with the Indianapolis Colts. He was released by Indianapolis on August 29, and was re-signed to the team's practice squad the next day. Skipper was released by the Colts on September 4.

=== Detroit Lions (fourth stint) ===
On September 20, 2023, Skipper was signed to the Detroit Lions' practice squad. He was promoted to the active roster on October 14. In the team's Week 16 game against the Dallas Cowboys, Skipper was involved in a controversial call that negated the team a successful two-point conversion with 23 seconds left and a potential win, after officials flagged Lions offensive tackle Taylor Decker for an illegal touching penalty, as a result of a confusion in which the Lions tackle was accidentally reported as an eligible receiver by the referee. In the season finale against the Minnesota Vikings, he caught a four-yard pass. Skipper appeared in 11 games for the team (including one start).

On March 14, 2024, Skipper re-signed with the Lions. In the 47-9 win against the Dallas Cowboys, nine months after the two-point conversion controversial penalty, Skipper reported as an eligible receiver on the first offensive play for the Lions, in addition, Decker had a redzone target that was incomplete, offensive tackle Penei Sewell had a touchdown run reversed due to an ineligible man downfield penalty and with just 4:28 minutes left in the game, Skipper ran a receiving route. On December 5, after a victory over the Green Bay Packers on Thursday Night Football that clinched a playoff berth for the Lions, Skipper appeared to be vomiting in a post-game video posted by the team. Upon noticing Skipper's discomfort, head coach Dan Campbell exclaimed, "There you go, Skip, keep throwing up!" In a game against the Buffalo Bills on December 15, Skipper caught a nine-yard touchdown pass from Jared Goff, his first career receiving touchdown.

Skipper would go on to part ways with the Lions for the fourth time as he would be released on August 25, 2025. However, on August 27, he would be re-signed to the Lions' practice squad. On October 8, Skipper was promoted to the active roster.

On January 22, 2026, Skipper announced his retirement from professional football.

== Coaching career ==
On February 11, 2026, the Detroit Lions hired Skipper to serve as an offensive assistant under head coach Dan Campbell.
