= Boston University Tanglewood Institute =

School in Lenox, Massachusetts, US

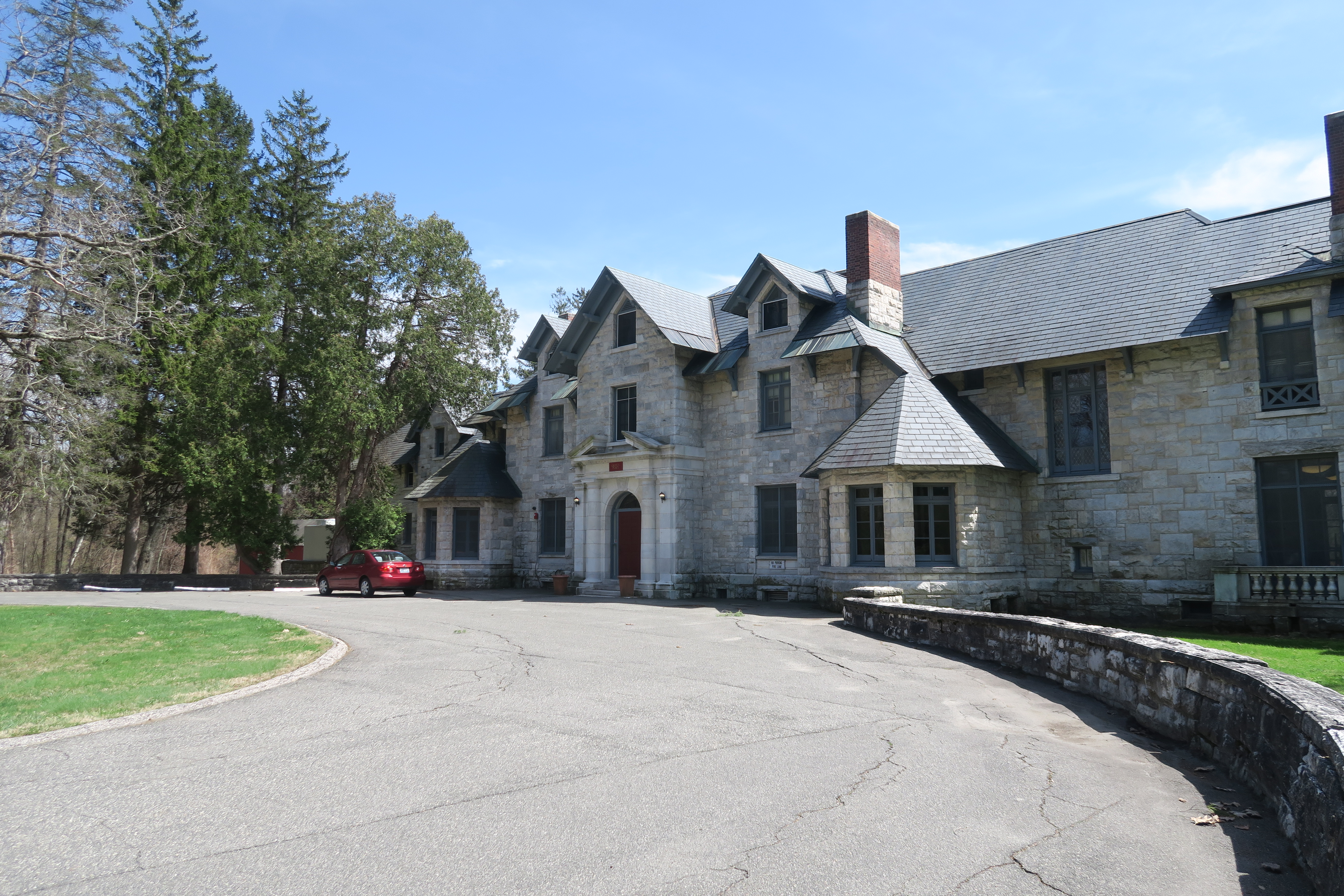

Location
- 45 West Street; Lenox, Massachusetts; United States

Information
- Type: Summer training program for musicians ages 10 through 20
- Established: 1966; 60 years ago
- Enrollment: 430
- Campus: Lenox, MA
- Website: bu.edu/cfa/tanglewood

The Boston University Tanglewood Institute (BUTI) is a summer music training program for students age 10 to 20 in Lenox, Massachusetts, under the auspices of the Boston University College of Fine Arts.

== History ==
BUTI was envisioned in 1965 when Erich Leinsdorf, then music director of the Boston Symphony Orchestra (BSO), invited Edward Stein, dean of the Boston University College of Fine Arts, to create a summer training program for young musicians as an extension to the BSO's Tanglewood Music Center (TMC). BUTI opened for its inaugural season the following June.

Groton Place, the central building on campus, was home to multiple organizations prior to BUTI's residency. Built in 1905 as a summer home for Grenville Lindall Winthrop, it was purchased in 1943 to serve as the home for the Windsor Mountain School. After that the site was used to host the now-defunct Holliston College from 1976 to 1980, after which Boston University purchased the property to operate BUTI.

BUTI celebrated its 50th anniversary season in 2016.

== Campus ==
BUTI's 64-acre campus is situated at 45 West Street in Lenox, Massachusetts, approximately one mile from the Tanglewood Music Festival. This property contains instructional and practice facilities, a 250-seat proscenium theater, dormitories, administrative offices, and a cafeteria. BUTI also utilizes instructional facilities at Tanglewood, Berkshire Country Day School, and Morris Elementary School, and performance venues including Seiji Ozawa Hall, the Koussevitzky Music Shed, Trinity Episcopal Church, and Church on the Hill.

== Academics ==
During June, July, and August, BUTI offers 23 individual programs for strings, woodwinds, brass, percussion, harp, voice, piano, and composition. In mid-June, a series of two-week workshops are offered for flute, oboe, clarinet, bassoon, saxophone, French horn, trumpet, trombone, tuba and euphonium, percussion, violin, viola, cello, double bass, string quartet, and electroacoustic composition. Students attending these programs range in age from 14 to 20. A Junior Strings Intensive, introduced for the first time in summer 2017, is also offered during these two weeks and is for violin, viola, and cello students age 10–13.

Beginning in July a series of longer programs begin, including a three- or six-week Young Artists Piano Program, four-week Young Artists Wind Ensemble, and six-week Young Artists Vocal Program, Young Artists Composition Program, and Young Artists Orchestra. These programs are for students age 14–19 who have not yet begun full-time college study.

BUTI also offers elective courses, including music theory and music history, and a health and wellness series consisting of Feldenkrais Method, yoga, and body mapping.

== Concert Season ==
The BUTI concert season consists of more than 70 events per summer, including six performances at Seiji Ozawa Hall and one at Tanglewood on Parade. Performances include large-ensemble concerts, student and faculty recitals, chamber music, art song recitals, opera scenes, and new music recitals. Most performances are free and open to the public.

== Alumni ==
Notable alumni include:

- Lauren Ambrose, actor
- Kenneth Amis, composer, tuba player, educator, and conductor
- Steven Ansell, principal violist, Boston Symphony Orchestra
- Mason Bates, composer
- David Bernard, Music Director, Park Avenue Chamber Symphony
- Michael Brown, pianist-composer
- Harry Connick Jr., musician, actor
- Joseph Conyers, assistant principal double bassist, Philadelphia Orchestra
- David Krauss, principal trumpet, Metropolitan Opera
- Benjamin Levy, double bassist, Boston Symphony Orchestra
- Missy Mazzoli, composer
- Nico Muhly, composer
- Robert Paterson, composer, conductor, percussionist
- Charles Pikler, principal violist, Chicago Symphony Orchestra
- Todd Seeber, double bassist, Boston Symphony Orchestra
- Neal Stulberg, pianist-conductor
- Lawrence Wolfe, double bassist, Boston Symphony Orchestra
- Owen Young, cellist, Boston Symphony Orchestra
- Michael Gordon, principal flutist, Kansas City Symphony
- Jonathan Bisesi, Percussion, (ret.)The "President's Own" United States Marine Band

Director, Boston University Tanglewood Institute Percussion Workshop

- Greg LaRosa, Principal Timpanist, New Jersey Symphony Orchestra
