= Smoky Hill High School =

Location
- 16100 East Smoky Hill Road; Aurora, Colorado 80015; United States; 39°37′40″N 104°47′59″W

Information
- Type: Public
- Motto: Home of the Buffs
- Established: 1974 (52 years ago)
- School district: Cherry Creek School District
- CEEB code: 060452
- Principal: Kelly Helm
- Teaching staff: 116.40 (FTE)
- Grades: 9–12
- Enrollment: 2,281 (2023-2024)
- Student to teacher ratio: 19.60
- Colors: Forest green and scarlet
- Athletics: 5A
- Athletics conference: Centennial League
- Mascot: Buffalo
- Nickname: Buffs
- Website: smokyhill.cherrycreekschools.org

Smoky Hill High School, commonly Smoky or SHHS, is located in Aurora, Colorado, United States. It has an attendance of 2,133. Smoky Hill is part of the Cherry Creek School District and was the second high school built by the district in 1974.

The name originates from the Smoky Hill Trail, a historic trail stretching from Kansas to Denver. The trail is also the namesake of Smoky Hill Road, where the school is located.

== Curriculum ==
In 1991, Smoky Hill became the second high school in Colorado to offer the International Baccalaureate Program. Since then, Smoky Hill has consistently been recognized in Newsweek's nationwide list of excellent high schools. Additionally, in 2006, Smoky Hill's AVID program was the sole school in the AVID Western Division to receive recognition as a National Demonstration School with Distinction. Smoky Hill also strongly supports the Advanced Placement program, offering a total of nineteen AP classes.

== Renovations ==
In the summer of 2010, the Cherry Creek School District initiated renovations to enhance the overall functionality of the building. These renovations included enlarging the windows, completely reconstructing the pool area, installing new carpet, and modernizing the general aesthetics of the school to align with contemporary design styles. All renovations were finished before the start of the 2010–2011 academic year, with the exception of the pool area, which was completed during the first quarter of the school year.

== Athletics ==
Smoky Hill High School is part of the eight-team Centennial League that also includes Cherry Creek, Grandview, Arapahoe, Cherokee Trail, Eaglecrest, Mullen, and Overland high schools.

=== Track and field ===
In 1992, Smoky Hill won its first state championship in track. Their first State Championship was in football in the 1970's. They also had a three-time state championship run during 2003–2005.

== International Baccalaureate (IB) ==
In 1991, Smoky Hill became the second International Baccalaureate Diploma School established in the state of Colorado.

The International Baccalaureate (IB) Diploma Programme (DP) is an educational programme examined in one of three languages (English, French or Spanish) and is a leading university entrance course.

The programme, administered by the International Baccalaureate Organization, is a recognized pre-university educational programme. Students take six subjects, and must also pass three extra requirements, for example Theory of Knowledge (ToK), a 4000-word Extended Essay (EE), and a requirement of at least a total of 150 hours in CAS (Creative, Action, Service).

Smoky Hill boasts its ability to offer one of the newer tests in the International Baccalaureate Programme, Digital Media Studies. 2009 was the first year that students tested in both the Higher Level and Standard Level of the test.

== Demographics ==
- 39.8% – White
- 27.6% – Hispanic
- 17.8% – African American
- 7.4% – Two or more races
- 6.3% – Asian American
- 0.7% – Native Hawaiian/Pacific Islander
- 0.6% – American Indian/Alaska Native
- 52% – Male
- 48% – Female
- 31% – Free and Reduced Lunch

== Notable alumni ==
- Nura Afia, vlogger
- Robert Cardillo , security advisor to Barack Obama (class of 1979)
- Jenny Cavnar, sports broadcaster (class of 2000)
- Lesley Chilcott, documentarian
- Alison Dunlap, Olympic mountain biker
- Maggie Flecknoe, voice actress and news reporter (class of 2001)
- Kelly Hansen, lead singer in Foreigner (class of 1979)
- Mike McDaniel, former NFL head coach for the Miami Dolphins (class of 2001)
- Adrian Miller, White House policy advisor (Clinton Administration), American culinary historian, lawyer
- Cory Sandhagen, mixed martial artist
- Dan Soder, stand-up comedian (class of 2001)
- Chase Vaughn, football linebacker
- Bowen Yang, comedian and cast member of Saturday Night Live (class of 2008)

== See also ==
- List of high schools in Colorado
