= Eaglecrest High School =

Location
- 5100 South Picadilly Street; Aurora, Arapahoe County, Colorado 80015; United States; 39°37′27″N 104°44′09″W

Information
- Type: Public
- Established: 1991 (35 years ago)
- School district: Cherry Creek School District
- CEEB code: 060066
- Principal: Gwen Hansen-Vigil
- Teaching staff: 155.50 (FTE)
- Grades: 9–12
- Enrollment: 2,988 (2023-2024)
- Student to teacher ratio: 19.22
- Colors: Red, black, silver
- Athletics: Class 5A
- Athletics conference: Centennial League
- Nickname: Raptors
- Website: www.cherrycreekschools.org/eaglecrest

Eaglecrest High School is a public high school located in unincorporated Arapahoe County, Colorado, near the cities of Aurora and Centennial. Eaglecrest was the fourth high school to open in the Cherry Creek School District, and it is a member of the 5A Centennial League. Initially serving grades 7–10, it later transitioned to a traditional 9–12 high school.

== Academics ==
Eaglecrest offers Advanced Placement courses for its students.

Eaglecrest High School received the American Association of School Librarians' 2014 National School Library Program of the Year Award.

== Demographics ==
The demographic breakdown of the 3,093 students enrolled in 2022-23 was:

- Male - 52.3%
- Female - 47.7%
- Native American/Alaskan - 0.5%
- Asian/Pacific islanders - 7.3%
- Black - 14.7%
- Hispanic - 25.3%
- White - 44.2%
- Multiracial - 7.9%

== Athletics ==
The Eaglecrest Raptors compete in the Centennial League along with the Arapahoe Warriors, Cherry Creek Bruins, Cherokee Trail Cougars, Grandview Wolves, Mullen Mustangs, Overland Trailblazers, and Smoky Hill Buffaloes.

Eaglecrest has won a total of 15 State Championships since 1991, the latest of which was the title for Basketball in 2018.

- Cheerleading – State champions (1994, 1995, 1997, 1998, 1999, 2001, 2003, 2008, 2015, 2019, 2021);UCA National High School Cheerleading Championship (NHSCC) 2nd Runner-up (2019), National Champions (2020), 1st Runner-up (2022)
- Football – State champions (1993)
- Hip hop – State champions (2019, 2021, 2022, 2023)
- Track & field – State champions (2002)
- Softball – State champions (2005)
- Volleyball – 5A State champions (2006)
- Boys' basketball – State champions (2013, 2017, 2025)

== Notable people ==
- Melat Kiros, lawyer and politician
- Jordyn Poulter, U.S. Olympic gold medalist and professional volleyball player
- Colbey Ross, professional basketball player
