= T. J. Cunningham =

American football player (1972–2019)

No. 21
- Position: Safety

Personal information
- Born: October 24, 1972; Aurora, Colorado, U.S.
- Died: February 18, 2019 (aged 46); Parker, Colorado, U.S.
- Listed height: 6 ft 0 in (1.83 m)
- Listed weight: 197 lb (89 kg)

Career information
- High school: Overland
- College: Colorado
- NFL draft: 1996: 6th round, 209th overall pick

Career history
- Seattle Seahawks (1996); Seattle Seahawks (1998)*; Philadelphia Eagles (1999)*
- * Offseason or practice squad member only

Career NFL statistics
- Games played: 9
- Fumble recoveries: 1
- Stats at Pro Football Reference

Anthony "T. J." Cunningham Jr. (October 24, 1972 – February 18, 2019) was a safety in the National Football League (NFL), playing for the Seattle Seahawks in 1996. Cunningham decided to retire after only one season. He played college football for Colorado.

== Early life and education ==
Cunningham was born in Aurora, Colorado. He graduated from Overland High School.

After his star football career in high school, Cunningham attended college at the University of Colorado Boulder, playing football there as well.

== Career ==
=== Athletic career ===
Cunningham was selected by the Seattle Seahawks in the sixth round (209th overall) of the 1996 NFL draft. That year, Cunningham played in nine games before injuring his knee against the Oakland Raiders. He was released on August 25, 1997, after being placed on the physically unable to perform list a week prior.

=== After football ===
After his playing career, Cunningham returned to his hometown and worked at William C. Hinkley High School, part of Aurora Public Schools, as its assistant principal.

== Death ==
On February 17, 2019, Cunningham was shot at Eaglecrest High School in Arapahoe County by a neighbor following an ongoing dispute over a parking space. He had met with the suspect, Marcus Johnson, at the parking lot to "box it out", when Johnson shot him three times. He died the following day as a result of his injuries. Johnson was charged with first degree murder. He was found guilty of second degree murder and was sentenced to 45 years in prison.
