= Cherry Creek Schoolhouse =

Historic property

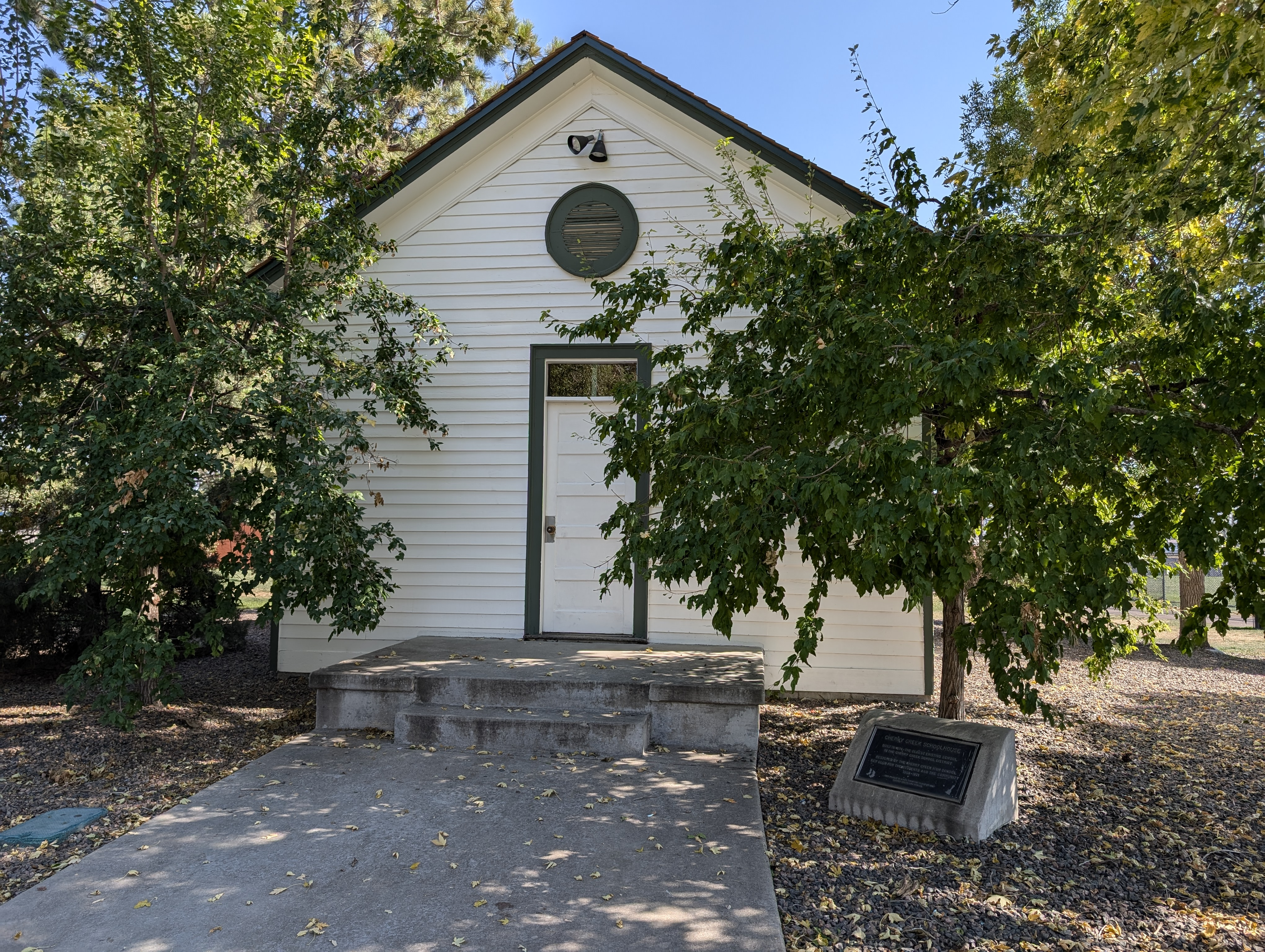
Constructed in 1874, this wood frame rural schoolhouse served as a school until consolidation forced its closure in 1951. The building is now located on the campus of Cherry Creek High School.

The Cherry Creek Schoolhouse, built in 1874, is the oldest surviving school in the Cherry Creek School District. It served as a rural schoolhouse until 1951, when consolidation led to its closure.

In 1953, it was sold at auction to a farmer who moved it to his ranch in Parker, Colorado with plans to remodel it. Instead, it remained on his property for the next 16 years, being used as a storage shed. In 1969, the schoolhouse was purchased by the Cherry Creek High School Key Club and relocated to the campus of Cherry Creek High School. The students began a project to renovate and refurbish the building, which was completed in 1971 and dedicated to use by students and the community. A plaque, gifted by the class of 1987, commemorates the restoration. The schoolhouse has the distinction of being the oldest building in the city of Greenwood Village and is listed on the Colorado State Register of Historic Properties (Site Number: 5AH.168).
