= Sean Moran =

American football player (born 1973)

No. 98, 77, 99
- Position: Defensive end

Personal information
- Born: June 5, 1973 (age 53); Aurora, Colorado, U.S.
- Listed height: 6 ft 4 in (1.93 m)
- Listed weight: 320 lb (145 kg)

Career information
- High school: Overland (Aurora)
- College: Colorado State
- NFL draft: 1996: 4th round, 120th overall pick

Career history
- Buffalo Bills (1996–1999); St. Louis Rams (2000–2001); San Francisco 49ers (2002–2003); St. Louis Rams (2004)*
- * Offseason or practice squad member only

Career NFL statistics
- Tackles: 139
- Sacks: 10.5
- Interceptions: 2
- Stats at Pro Football Reference

Sean Farrell Moran (born June 5, 1973) is an American former professional football player who was a defensive end in the National Football League (NFL) for the Buffalo Bills, St. Louis Rams, and the San Francisco 49ers. He played college football for the Colorado State Rams and was selected in the fourth round of the 1996 NFL draft with the 120th overall pick.

Moran attended Overland High School.
