= Blake Purchase =

American football player (born 2004)

No. 3 – Ole Miss Rebels
- Position: Defensive end
- Class: Senior

Personal information
- Born: October 24, 2004 (age 22)
- Listed height: 6 ft 3 in (1.91 m)
- Listed weight: 245 lb (111 kg)

Career information
- High school: Cherry Creek (Greenwood Village, Colorado)
- College: Oregon (2023–2025); Ole Miss (2026–present)
- Stats at ESPN

Blake Brian Purchase (born October 24, 2004) is an American college football defensive end for the Ole Miss Rebels. He previously played for the Oregon Ducks.

== Early life ==
Purchase attended Cherry Creek High School in Greenwood Village, Colorado. As a senior, he was the Colorado Gatorade Football Player of the Year after recording 57 tackles and 18 sacks. He finished his career with 158 tackles with 31 sacks and helped lead his team to four straight state championships. A four-star recruit, Purchase committed to the University of Oregon to play college football.

== College career ==
Purchase played in 35 games with three starts at Oregon from 2023 to 2025, recording 39 tackles, 3.5 sacks and an interception. After the 2025 season, he entered the transfer portal and committed to the University of Mississippi (Ole Miss).

== Personal life ==
Purchase's brother Myles, played as a cornerback for the Iowa State Cyclones.
