= Myles Purchase =

American football player (born 2002)

Profile
- Position: Cornerback

Personal information
- Born: November 26, 2002 (age 23); Denver, Colorado, U.S.
- Listed height: 5 ft 9 in (1.75 m)
- Listed weight: 203 lb (92 kg)

Career information
- High school: Cherry Creek (Greenwood Village, Colorado)
- College: Iowa State (2021–2024)
- NFL draft: 2025: undrafted

Career history
- Los Angeles Chargers (2025)*; New York Giants (2025)*; Los Angeles Chargers (2026)*
- * Offseason or practice squad member only
- Stats at Pro Football Reference

Myles Purchase (born November 26, 2002) is an American professional football cornerback. He played college football for the Iowa State Cyclones.

== Early life ==
Purchase attended Cherry Creek High School in Greenwood Village, Colorado. He was rated as a three-star recruit and committed to play college football for the Iowa State Cyclones.

== College career ==
As a freshman in 2021, Purchase appeared in all 13 games for the Cyclones, where he notched 13 tackles with a half tackle being for a loss, and a pass deflection. Heading into the 2022 season, he earned a starting spot in the Cyclones secondary. In his first two seasons as a starter in 2022 and 2023, Purchase totaled 97 tackles with seven being for a loss, a sack, 18 pass deflections, and a forced fumble in 25 games. In week 10 of the 2024 season, he recorded his first career interception in a loss to Texas Tech.

== Professional career ==
Pre-draft measurables
Height	Weight	Arm length	Hand span	Wingspan	40-yard dash	10-yard split	20-yard split	20-yard shuttle	Three-cone drill	Vertical jump	Broad jump	Bench press
5 ft 9 1/8 in (1.76 m)	203 lb (92 kg)	30 3/8 in (0.77 m)	8 7/8 in (0.23 m)	6 ft 1 1/4 in (1.86 m)	4.51 s	1.56 s	2.60 s	4.41 s	7.38 s	35.0 in (0.89 m)	10 ft 2 in (3.10 m)	17 reps
All values from Pro Day

=== Los Angeles Chargers ===
Purchase signed with the Los Angeles Chargers as an undrafted free agent on April 26, 2025. He was waived on August 26 as part of final roster cuts and re-signed to the practice squad the next day. On September 30, Purchase was released by the Chargers. He was re-signed to the team's practice squad on October 15. Purchase was released on November 4.

=== New York Giants ===
On November 25, 2025, Purchase was signed to the New York Giants' practice squad. He signed a reserve/future contract with New York on January 5, 2026. On April 6, Purchase was released by the Giants.

=== Los Angeles Chargers (second stint) ===
On May 12, 2026, Purchase signed with the Los Angeles Chargers. He was waived by Los Angeles as a part of final roster cuts on August 30.

== Personal life ==
Purchase's brother Blake, plays as a defensive end for the Ole Miss Rebels.
