= Cherry Creek School District =

School district in Arapahoe County, Colorado, US

Cherry Creek School District 5 Cherry Creek Public Schools
- 4700 South Yosemite Street Greenwood Village, Colorado, 80111

District information
- Type: Public
- Motto: Dedicated to Excellence
- Grades: K-12
- Established: 1950 (76 years ago)
- Superintendent: Jennifer Perry (Interim)
- Schools: 69 total
- NCES District ID: 0802910

Students and staff
- Students: 55,699
- Teachers: 3,082.17
- Student–teacher ratio: 18.07

Other information
- Website: www.cherrycreekschools.org

The Cherry Creek School District 5, also known as Cherry Creek Public Schools, is a school district located in western Arapahoe County, Colorado. The current superintendent is Christopher Smith. Former superintendent Scott Siegfried, Ph.D. announced his retirement on January 22, 2021. It consists of elementary, middle, and high schools. The district headquarters are in Greenwood Village.

The district serves more than 54,000 children and more 300,000 residents in 108 square miles that spread across seven municipalities. The district serves portions of Aurora and Centennial, which make up its majority. The district also encompasses Foxfield and Glendale, as well as most of Cherry Hills Village, portions of Greenwood Village and Englewood, and adjoining areas of unincorporated Arapahoe County.

== History ==
The original Cherry Creek Schoolhouse, built in 1874, is the oldest surviving school in the district. It was relocated to the Cherry Creek High School campus and restored by students in the 1970s.

Cherry Creek School District No. 5 was voted into existence in 1950 by residents of seven Arapahoe County school districts.

Existing schools in the new district included:

- Melvin School, currently a schoolhouse museum on the Smoky Hill High School campus
- Castlewood School, dismantled when I-25 was built and replaced with Belleview Elementary in 1954
- Cherry Creek Elementary School
- Cherry Hills Elementary School

CCSD now comprises 42 elementary schools, 10 middle schools and six high schools, in addition to an alternative high school, a magnet school and two charter schools. District enrollment now exceeds 54,200, and the first class of school room instructors has grown to about 3,700 teachers.

In 2022, the district announced that it would discontinue the practice of recognizing valedictorians, starting with the class of 2026.

== Institute of Science and Technology ==
In 2011, the district opened the Institute of Science and Technology, a campus devoted specifically to science, technology, engineering and math (STEM) education. The building, located at 12500 E. Jewell Avenue in Aurora, is part of the Overland High School-Prairie Middle School campus. It serves Overland and Prairie students through a rich and rigorous curriculum.

The school was designed by Hutton Architecture Studio and built by Saunders Construction. Approved by Cherry Creek voters in 2008, the $18 million, 58,000 square foot facility features lines of latitude and longitude on the floors, galaxies of stars on the ceilings, and windows that represent Fibonacci's sequence.

== Cherry Creek Innovation Campus ==
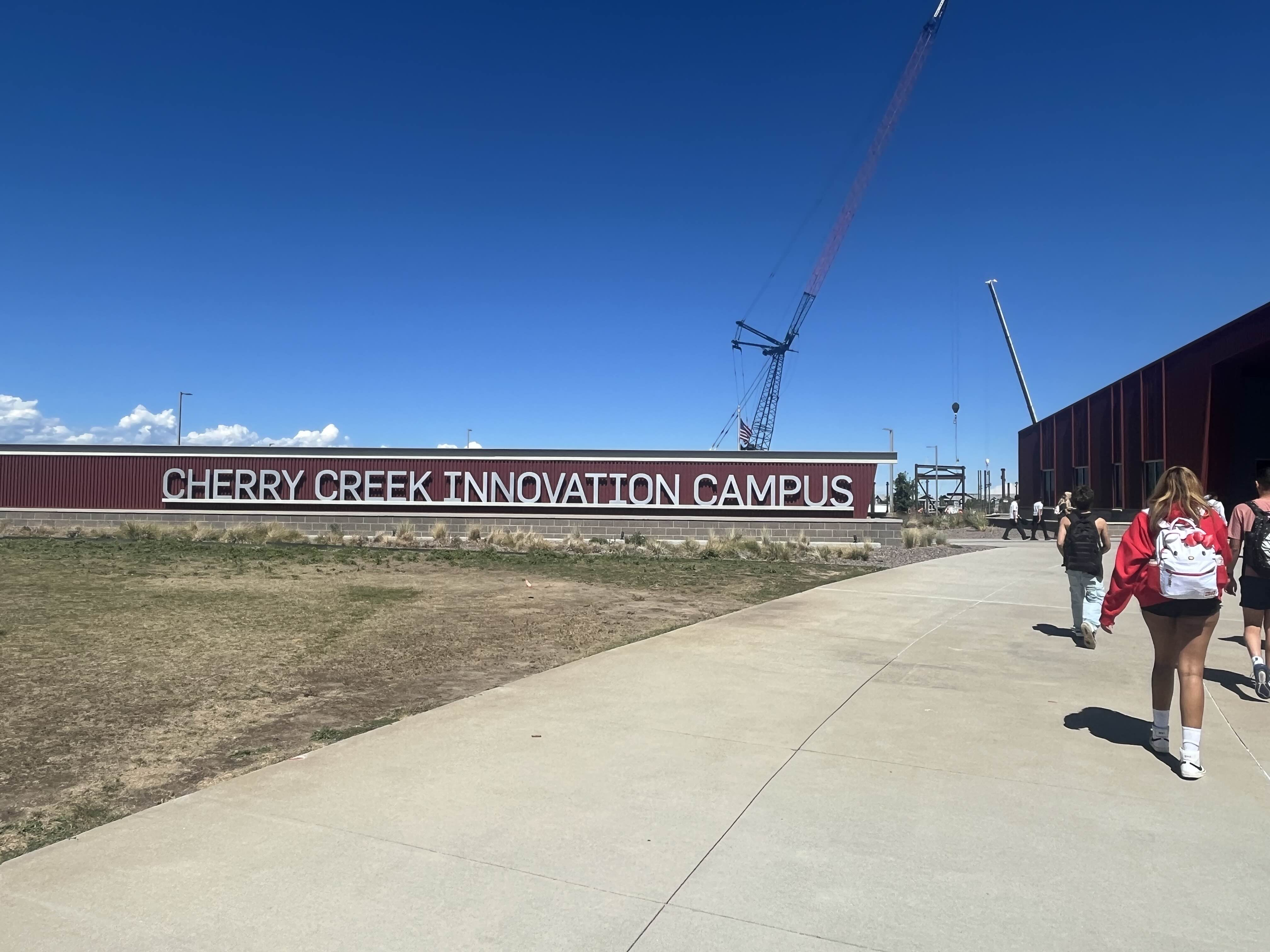
The entry sign at Cherry Creek Innovation Campus with the construction of CCIC 2.0 behind it.

In November 2016, Cherry Creek School District voters approved funding for the construction of the Cherry Creek Innovation Campus (CCIC), located at 8000 S. Chambers Rd, Centennial, Colorado. The facility opened on August 1, 2019, for the 2019–2020 school year. Students remain enrolled at their home high schools for core classes and travel to CCIC either by district-run bus or personal transportation.

The campus offers eight career-focused "Pathways": Aerospace Manufacturing, Business Services, Criminal Justice, Health and Wellness, Hospitality & Tourism, Infrastructure Engineering, Information Technology & STEAM, and Automotive and Aviation Maintenance. These programs provide opportunities for additional high school and college credits, as well as professional certifications such as Certified Nursing Assistant (CNA), Certified SOLIDWORKS Associate (CSWA), and the ProStart National Certificate of Achievement.

In 2024, the district announced an expansion project known as "CCIC 2.0," which will increase capacity by 70%, add eight new pathways, and expand classroom space for existing programs. The new sections of the facility are scheduled to open in Fall 2026.

== Schools ==
=== Elementary schools ===
- Altitude Elementary School
- Antelope Ridge Elementary School
- Arrowhead Elementary School
- Aspen Crossing Elementary School
- Belleview Elementary School
- Black Forest Hills Elementary School
- Buffalo Trail Elementary School
- Canyon Creek Elementary School
- Challenge (K-8 Magnet) Middle School
- Cherry Creek Academy K-5 (Charter)
- Cherry Hills Village Elementary School
- Cimarron Elementary School
- Cottonwood Creek Elementary School
- Coyote Hills Elementary School
- Creekside Elementary School
- Dakota Valley Elementary School
- Dry Creek Elementary School
- Eastridge Community Elementary School
- Fox Hollow Elementary School
- Greenwood Elementary School
- Heritage Elementary School
- High Plains Elementary School
- Highline Community Elementary School
- Holly Hills Elementary School
- Homestead Elementary School
- Independence Elementary School
- Indian Ridge Elementary School
- Meadow Point Elementary School
- Mission Viejo Elementary School
- Mountain Vista Elementary School
- Peakview Elementary School
- Pine Ridge Elementary School
- Polton Elementary School
- Ponderosa Elementary School
- Red Hawk Ridge Elementary School
- Rolling Hills Elementary School
- Sagebrush Elementary School
- Summit Elementary School
- Sunrise Elementary School
- Timberline Elementary School
- Trails West Elementary School
- Village East Elementary School
- Walnut Hills Elementary School
- Willow Creek Elementary School
- Woodland Elementary School

=== Middle schools ===
- Campus Middle School
- Falcon Creek Middle School
- Fox Ridge Middle School
- Horizon Community Middle School
- Infinity Middle School
- Laredo Middle School
- Liberty Middle School
- Prairie Middle School
- Sky Vista Middle School
- Thunder Ridge Middle School
- West Middle School

=== High schools ===
- Cherokee Trail High School
- Cherry Creek High School
- Eaglecrest High School
- Grandview High School
- Overland High School
- Smoky Hill High School

=== Alternative programs ===
- Career and Technical Education
- Cherry Creek Academy (K-8 Charter)
- Cherry Creek Innovation Campus (CCIC)
- Endeavor Academy Alternative High School
- Foote Youth Services Center
- Heritage Heights Academy (K-8 Charter)
- Institute of Science and Technology
- Joliet Center
- I-Team Ranch
- I-Team Manor
