= Colbey Ross =

American basketball player (born 1998)

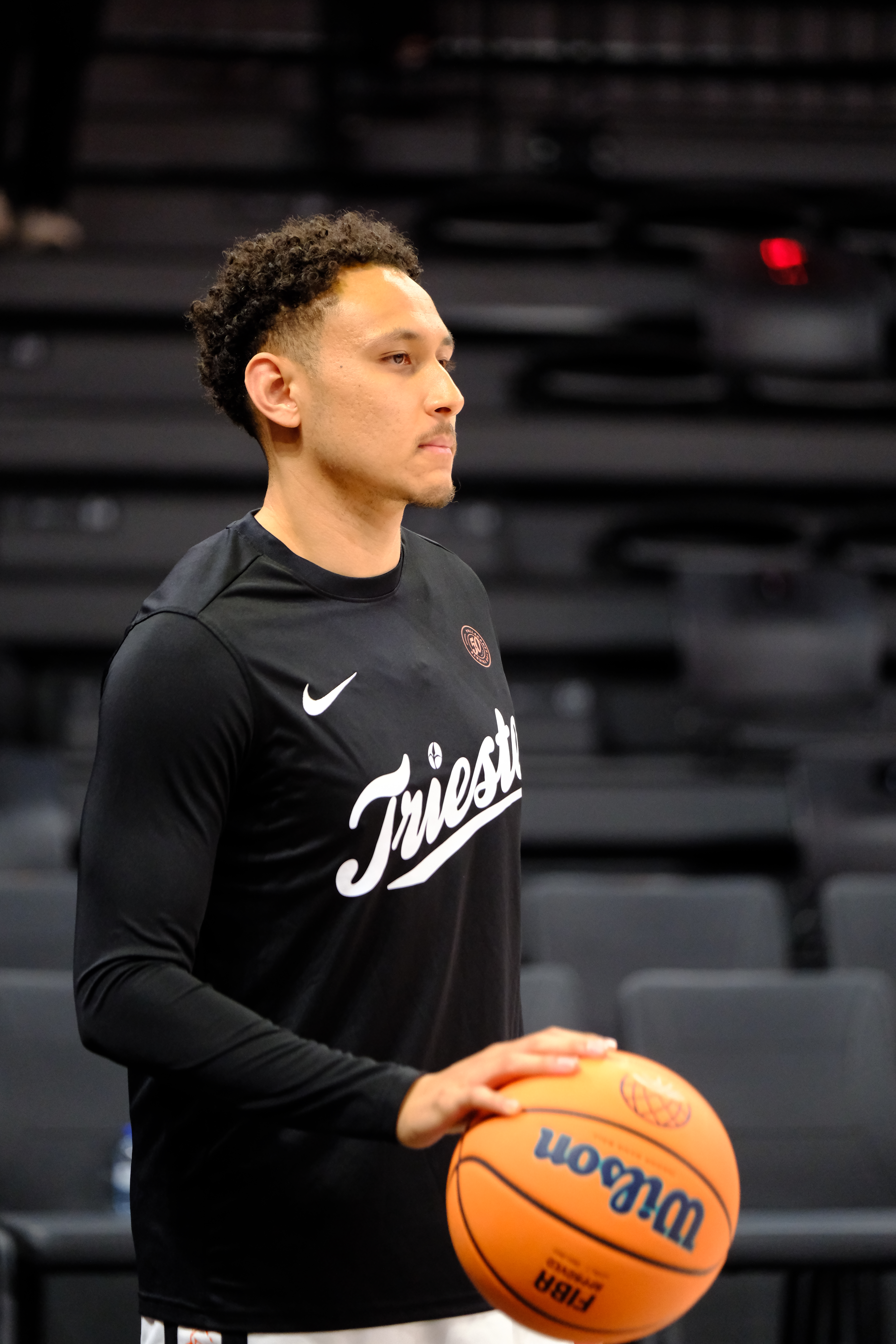
- Ross with Pallacanestro Trieste in 2025

No. 4 – Pallacanestro Trieste
- Position: Point guard
- League: LBA

Personal information
- Born: October 22, 1998 (age 27) Aurora, Colorado, U.S.
- Listed height: 6 ft 1 in (1.85 m)
- Listed weight: 185 lb (84 kg)

Career information
- High school: Eaglecrest (Centennial, Colorado)
- College: Pepperdine (2017–2021)
- NBA draft: 2021: undrafted
- Playing career: 2021–present

Career history
- 2021–2022: Nymburk
- 2022–2023: Pallacanestro Varese
- 2023: Budućnost VOLI
- 2023: Pallacanestro Varese
- 2023–2024: Derthona Basket
- 2024–present: Pallacanestro Trieste

Career highlights
- LBA Most Valuable Player (2023); All-LBA Team (2023); Czech Republic League champion (2022); CBI champion (2021); 3× First-team All-WCC (2019–2021); WCC All-Freshman Team (2018); Mr. Colorado Basketball (2017)

Colbey Ross (born October 22, 1998) is an American professional basketball player for Pallacanestro Trieste of the Italian Lega Basket Serie A (LBA). He played college basketball for the Pepperdine Waves.

== High school career ==
Ross played four years of varsity basketball for Eaglecrest High School in Centennial, Colorado. As a junior, he averaged 18.6 points, 4.6 rebounds and 3.4 assists per game, leading his team to the Class 5A state title game. Ross was named Colorado Gatorade Player of the Year and was the only junior selected to play in the state's High School All-Star Game. As a senior, he averaged 18.4 points, 5.0 assists, 4.9 rebounds and 2.4 steals per game, helping Eaglecrest win the Class 5A state championship and earning most valuable player of the state tournament. Ross was recognized as Mr. Colorado Basketball and repeated as Colorado Gatorade Player of the Year. He was lightly recruited by college basketball programs and committed to Pepperdine over two other NCAA Division I scholarship offers, from Northern Colorado and Pacific.

== College career ==
On November 20, 2017, in his fourth college game at Pepperdine, Ross scored a freshman season-high 25 points and added five rebounds and four assists in a 92–84 loss to UC Santa Barbara at the Legends Classic. On January 18, 2018, he scored 25 points for a second time, along with eight assists, in a 92–78 loss to Pacific. As a freshman, Ross averaged 14 points, 5.6 assists and three rebounds per game, setting a school freshman record for total assists, with 179. He was named to the West Coast Conference (WCC) All-Freshman Team and was an All-WCC honorable mention selection. On December 31, 2018, as a sophomore, Ross posted 10 points and a career-high 13 assists in a 100–64 victory over Alabama A&M. On March 2, 2019, he scored a season-high 36 points and reached 1,000 career points in a 73–72 loss to Pacific. Ross earned WCC All-Tournament Team honors after leading Pepperdine to the semifinals of the 2019 WCC tournament. He averaged 19.4 points, a WCC-high seven assists and 2.9 rebounds per game and was named to the first team All-WCC. Ross set single-season program records for total assists and assists per game.

On November 19, 2019, as a junior, Ross recorded a then-career-high 38 points and six rebounds in a 91–84 loss to USC. On January 4, 2020, he tallied 24 points and 10 assists in a 75–70 loss to second-ranked Gonzaga. Ross posted 30 points, including 27 in the second half, along with a career-high 14 rebounds and five assists in a 66–59 victory over Portland on February 20. In an 89–82 double overtime loss to Saint Mary's during the 2020 WCC tournament quarterfinals, Ross scored a career-high 43 points, making seven three-pointers while adding eight rebounds and five assists. He was named to the WCC All-Tournament Team. In his junior season, Ross averaged 20.5 points, a WCC-high 7.2 assists and 4.7 rebounds per game and earned first-team All-WCC honors for his second time. He broke his own school single-season assists record and was the only Division I player to average at least 20 points and seven assists per game. After the season, Ross entered the 2020 NBA draft, before withdrawing from the draft.

Coming into his senior season, Ross was named to the Preseason All-WCC team. On November 27, 2020, he became Pepperdine's all-time leading scorer while scoring 33 points in a 107–98 triple overtime loss to UCLA. Ross scored his 2,000th career point in a loss to Gonzaga on January 30, 2021. He averaged 17.5 points, 4.1 rebounds, and 7.7 assists per game, leading the Waves to their first College Basketball Invitational Championship.

== Professional career ==
On September 28, 2021, Ross signed with ERA Nymburk of the Czech National Basketball League.

On July 20, 2022, he has signed with Pallacanestro Varese of the Lega Basket Serie A (LBA).

On July 23, 2023, he signed with Budućnost VOLI of the Prva A Liga.

On December 21, 2023, he signed with Derthona Basket of the Italian LBA.

On July 5, 2024, he signed with Pallacanestro Trieste of the Italian Lega Basket Serie A (LBA).

== Career statistics ==
Legend
GP	Games played	GS	Games started	MPG	Minutes per game
FG%	Field goal percentage	3P%	3-point field goal percentage	FT%	Free throw percentage
RPG	Rebounds per game	APG	Assists per game	SPG	Steals per game
BPG	Blocks per game	PPG	Points per game	**Bold**	Career high

=== College ===
Year	Team	GP	GS	MPG	FG%	3P%	FT%	RPG	APG	SPG	BPG	PPG
2017–18	Pepperdine	32	32	31.8	**.465**	**.427**	.820	3.0	5.6	1.0	.2	14.0
2018–19	Pepperdine	**34**	**34**	34.9	.437	.396	.853	2.9	7.0	**1.2**	.1	19.4
2019–20	Pepperdine	32	32	**37.7**	.402	.349	**.854**	**4.7**	7.2	1.1	.2	**20.5**
2020–21	Pepperdine	27	27	37.6	.436	.341	.846	4.1	**7.7**	1.1	**.3**	17.5
Career		125	125	35.4	.431	.373	.847	3.6	6.8	1.1	.2	17.9

== Personal life ==
Ross' older brother, Elijah, played basketball for Eaglecrest High School and won a state championship in 2013. He later played NCAA Division II basketball for UCCS, earning all-conference honors and becoming the program's all-time leader in assists. Ross' favorite NBA player is Damian Lillard.
