= Nick Fazekas =

American-born Japanese basketball player (born 1985)

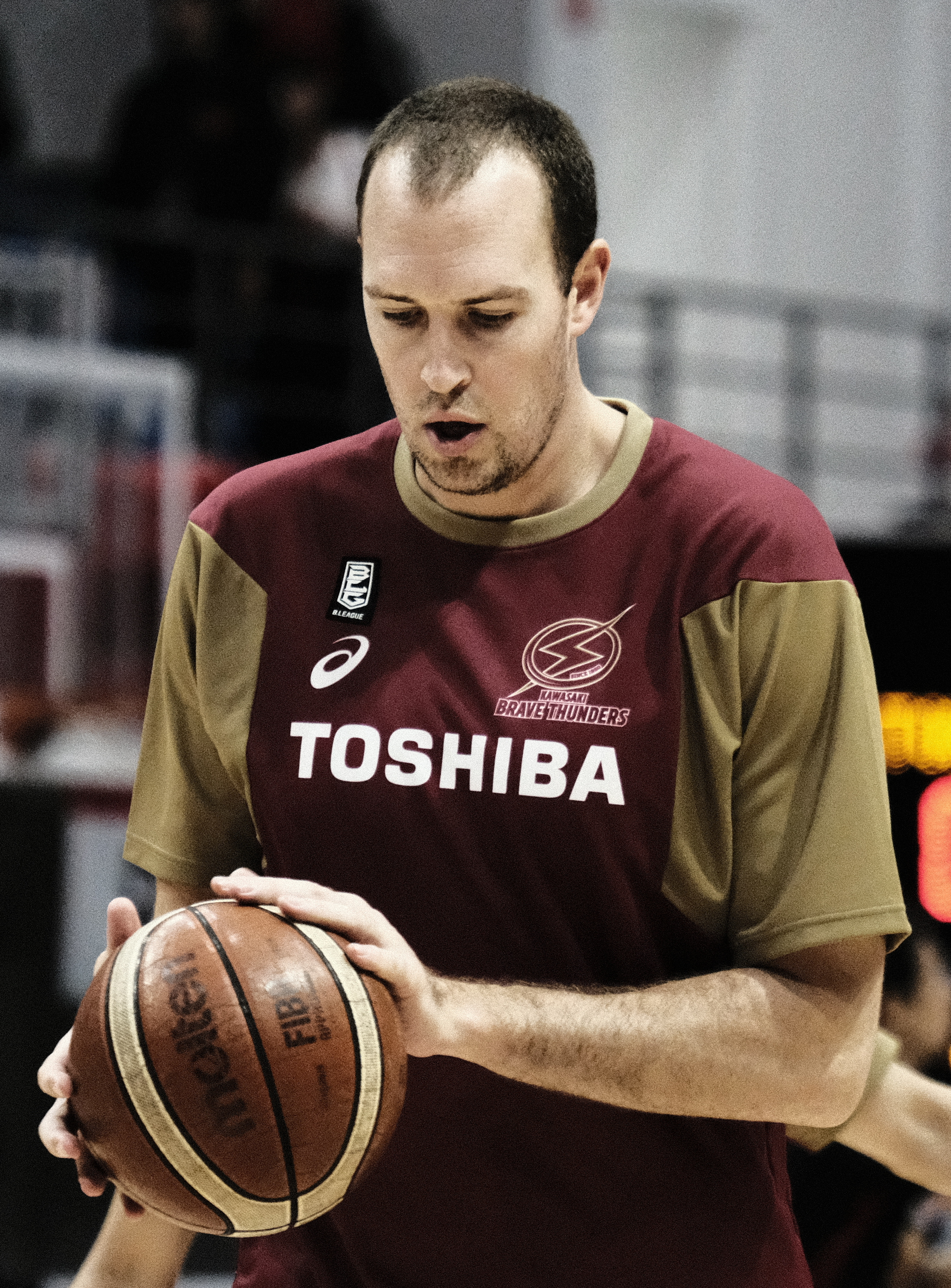
- Fazekas with the Brave Thunders in 2018

Personal information
- Born: June 17, 1985 (age 41) Arvada, Colorado, U.S.
- Listed height: 6 ft 10 in (2.08 m)
- Listed weight: 235 lb (107 kg)

Career information
- High school: Ralston Valley (Arvada, Colorado)
- College: Nevada (2003–2007)
- NBA draft: 2007: 2nd round, 34th overall pick
- Drafted by: Dallas Mavericks
- Playing career: 2007–2024
- Position: Power forward / center
- Number: 4, 5, 6, 17, 20, 22, 32

Career history
- 2007–2008: Dallas Mavericks
- 2007–2008: →Tulsa 66ers
- 2008: Los Angeles Clippers
- 2008–2009: Base Oostende
- 2009: ASVEL
- 2009–2010: JDA Dijon
- 2010–2011: Reno Bighorns
- 2012: Petron Blaze Boosters
- 2012–2024: Kawasaki Brave Thunders

Career highlights
- 2× B.League champion (2014, 2016); 3× B.League Player of the Year (2014, 2015, 2017); 2× B.League Finals MVP (2014, 2016); 5× All-B.League First Team (2014–2018); 4× B.League scoring leader (2013–2015, 2017); 2× B.League rebounding leader (2016, 2018); 3× B.League Import Player of the Year (2013–2015); 2× B.League All-Star (2014, 2015); LNB Pro A champion (2009); Consensus second-team All-American (2007); 3× WAC Player of the Year (2005–2007); 3× First-team All-WAC (2005–2007); No. 22 retired by Nevada Wolf Pack; Mr. Colorado Basketball (2003)
- Stats at NBA.com
- Stats at Basketball Reference

Nicholas Ryan Fazekas (born June 17, 1985) is an American-born Japanese former professional basketball player. He played college basketball for the Nevada Wolf Pack.

== Early career ==
Fazekas attended Ralston Valley High School in Arvada, Colorado where he earned the statewide Mr. Basketball Colorado honor for the 2002–03 season along with being a two-time 4A classification player of the year. As a senior, he led the Mustangs to a 25–2 record and a state championship after an undefeated regular season and semi-finals appearance the previous year. During his high school career he wore number 22 and he continued to do so in college.

== College career ==
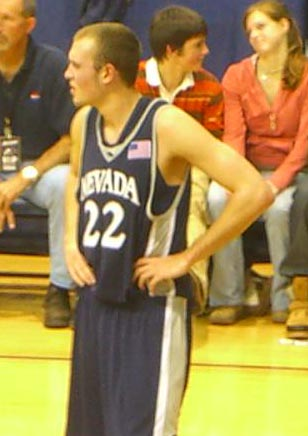
Fazekas playing for Nevada in 2007

Fazekas was signed by the University of Nevada for the 2003–04 season. From that point forward, Fazekas led the Wolf Pack to four straight NCAA tournament appearances during his matriculation, including a run to the Sweet 16 as a freshman. He became the school's all-time leading scorer on November 18, 2006, when he surpassed the old record of 1,877 points scored by Edgar Jones in 1979. He also surpassed the single-season scoring record formerly set by Jones during the 2005–06 season. Fazekas also earned his third straight WAC Player of the Year for the 2006–07 season, a feat only matched by Utah's Keith Van Horn, On February 28, 2019, Nevada retired Fazekas' number 22 in a ceremony at halftime of a win over UNLV. Fazekas became the second Wolf Pack basketball player to have his number retired, after Edgar Jones.

== Professional career ==
=== NBA career ===
Fazekas was an early entrant into the 2006 NBA draft, however he did not hire an agent, allowing him to eventually remove himself from consideration in order to play one more year of college basketball. The next year, he was taken with the 34th pick in the 2007 NBA draft by the Dallas Mavericks.

Fazekas was part of the Mavericks Summer League Team. He averaged 6.6 points and 4.4 rebounds while playing an average of 17 minutes a game. On July 26, the Mavericks signed Fazekas to a one-year contract. As part of the team's club policy, terms of the contract were not disclosed.

Fazekas was released by the Mavericks on February 19, 2008, to make room on the roster for Keith Van Horn, whose signing-and-trading was crucial to facilitate Dallas's trade for veteran point guard Jason Kidd from the New Jersey Nets. On February 27, 2008, he signed with the Clippers. However, on August 1, 2008, the Clippers withdrew their qualifying offer to Fazekas, leaving him as an unrestricted free agent. He was signed by the Denver Nuggets for training camp, but waived again on October 23, 2008.

He played for the Boston Celtics' 2009 Summer League team, leading the squad in scoring.

=== European career ===
After being waived by the Nuggets, Fazekas failed to find another home in NBA and decided to go overseas. On October 28, 2008, he signed with the Belgian team Base Oostende for the 2008–09 season. In January 2009, he left Base Oostende and joined the French Pro A club ASVEL Lyon-Villeurbanne After a stint with the Celtics summer league team, Fazekas signed with JDA Dijon, returning to the French Pro A for the 2009 season.

=== NBA D-League ===
Fazekas was selected by the Reno Bighorns with the first overall pick of the 2010 NBA Development League Draft. He was waived by the Bighorns on December 30, 2010, but rejoined the team for the 2011–12 season. In December 2011, he was waived again due to injury.

=== Toshiba Brave Thunders ===
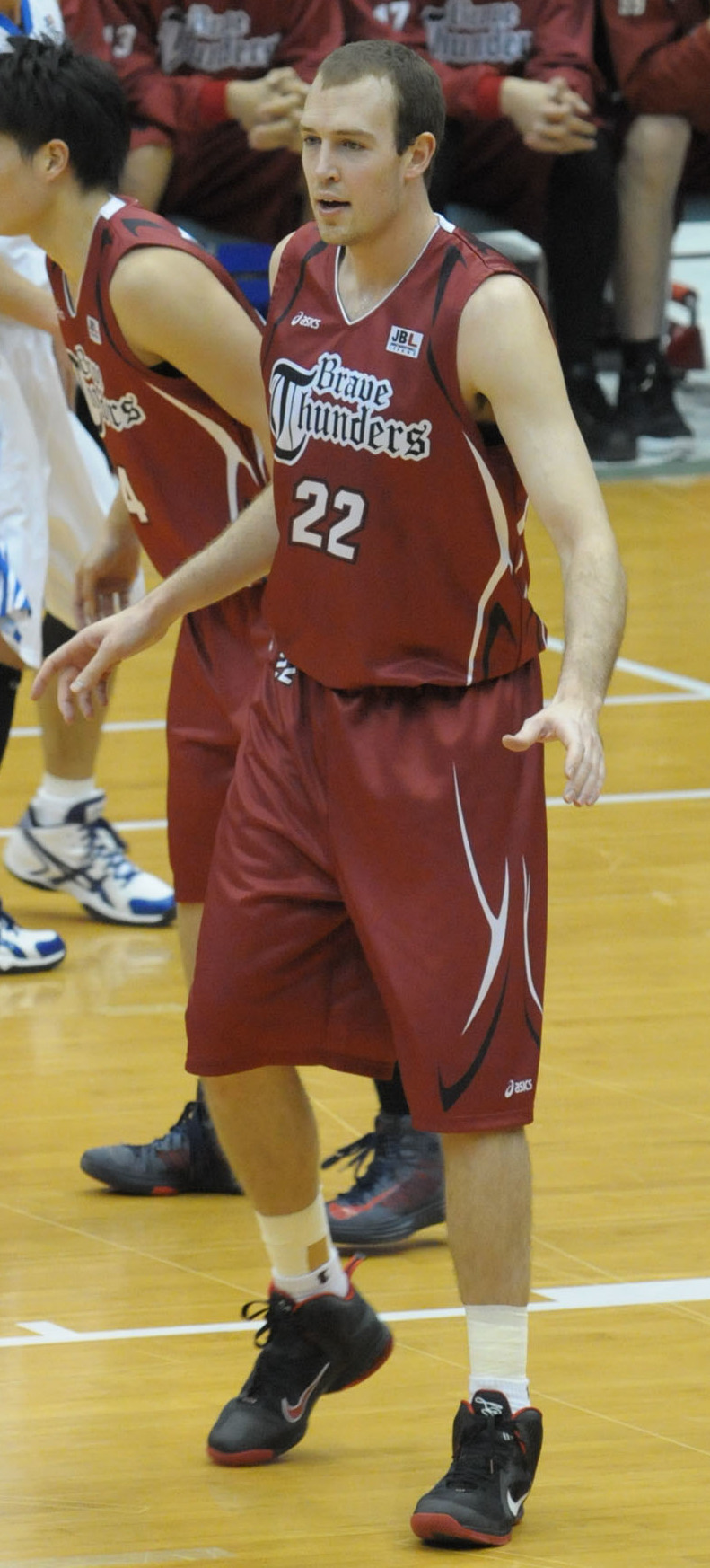
Fazekas in a game for the Brave Thunders in 2013

In 2012, Fazekas announced his move to Japan where he signed with the Toshiba Brave Thunders Kanagawa. Prior to that, he was a member of the San Miguel Beermen for the entire 2011 season. After his move, he led his team with 26.4 points and 13.5 rebounds, earning him an MVP award in 2012. He won the award again in 2013. In 2014, he led Toshiba Brave Thunders to an NBL Title by scoring 29 points which helped his team win 86–71 against Toyota Alvark in two periods. During the 2019–20 season, Fazekas averaged 23.1 points, 10.9 rebounds and 3.8 assists per game.

In May 2024, Fazekas retired from professional basketball.

== National team career ==
In the 2019 FIBA World Cup, Fazekas played center for the Japan national basketball team, starting alongside power forward Rui Hachimura. In a preliminary match in Saitama, Fazekas played extended minutes in Japan's first-ever FIBA victory over a European opponent, draining a corner three in the last 90 seconds to help Japan upset the visiting Germans.

== Personal life ==
Fazekas's grandfather, Albert Fazekas, was a freedom fighter in the 1956 Hungarian Revolution who escaped from a Soviet-operated Hungarian prison after setting himself on fire to create a diversion. He soon emigrated with his wife and child to the United States. They would have two more children, one of them Nick's father Joe, after arriving in America. Joe, who is 6 ft 10 in (2.08 m) himself, briefly played professional basketball in Argentina after playing college ball at Wyoming and Idaho State. In an interview, Fazekas said that he would like to become a Hungarian citizen and play for the Hungary national basketball team.

== Awards ==
- Two-time 4A Player of the Year (2001–02, 2002–03)
- Mr. Basketball-Colorado (2002–03)
- Three-time WAC Player of the Year (2004–05, 2005–06, 2006–07)
- Wooden Award Finalist (2005–06, 2006–07)
- Third AP Team All-American (2005–06)
- Second AP Team All-American (2006–07)
- First team ESPN All-American (2006–07)
- Joseph Kearney Award (2006)

== NBA career statistics ==
Legend
GP	Games played	GS	Games started	MPG	Minutes per game
FG%	Field goal percentage	3P%	3-point field goal percentage	FT%	Free throw percentage
RPG	Rebounds per game	APG	Assists per game	SPG	Steals per game
BPG	Blocks per game	PPG	Points per game	**Bold**	Career high

=== Regular season ===
Year	Team	GP	GS	MPG	FG%	3P%	FT%	RPG	APG	SPG	BPG	PPG
2007–08	Dallas	4	0	2.3	.400	.000	.000	.8	.0	.0	.0	1.0
2007–08	L.A. Clippers	**22**	0	**11.8**	**.571**	.000	**.682**	**3.9**	**.6**	**.4**	**.5**	**4.7**
Career		26	0	10.3	.561	.000	.682	3.4	.4	.3	.4	4.1

== International statistics ==
†	Denotes seasons in which Fazekas won a championship
*	Led the league

Year	Team	GP	GS	MPG	FG%	3P%	FT%	RPG	APG	SPG	BPG	PPG
2012–13	Toshiba	42	42	27.7	.545	.333	.705	12.1	1.2	.9	.8	21.5*
2013–14†	Toshiba	54	54	30.5	.560	.445	.756	13.5*	2.1	.8	1.7	26.4*
2014–15	Toshiba	50	50	31.2	.571	.401	.793	12.9	2.3	1.0	1.2	26.1*
2015–16†	Toshiba	54	54	33.0	.536	.370	.782	13.5*	1.9	1.0	1.0	25.9
2016–17	Kawasaki	60	60	30.3	.546	.428	.815	12.7	2.4	.8	.8	27.1*
2017–18	Kawasaki	60	59	29.9	.553	.446	.846	10.9*	2.8	1.2	.4	25.3
2018–19	Kawasaki	59	50	31.4	.514	.383	.857	11.0	3.0	1.1	.4	22.1
2019–20	Kawasaki	40	40	32.0	.514	.419	.831	11.0	3.7	1.0	.4	23.2
2020–21	Kawasaki	56	56	30.0	.534	.441	.848	9.7	3.7	.9	.3	20.7
2021–22	Kawasaki	55	55	29.3	.541	.420	.864	8.9	4.3	1.0	.3	19.7

== See also ==
- List of NCAA Division I men's basketball players with 2000 points and 1000 rebounds
