= Vashone Adams =

American football player (born 1973)

No. 27, 43, 24
- Position: Safety

Personal information
- Born: September 12, 1973 (age 53); Aurora, Colorado, U.S.
- Listed height: 5 ft 10 in (1.78 m)
- Listed weight: 201 lb (91 kg)

Career information
- High school: Overland (CO)
- College: Fort Hays State; Eastern Michigan
- NFL draft: 1995: undrafted

Career history
- Cleveland Browns (1995); Baltimore Ravens (1996); New Orleans Saints (1997); Kansas City Chiefs (1998); Dallas Cowboys (1999)

Career NFL statistics
- Tackles: 80
- Interceptions: 1
- Forced fumbles: 1
- Stats at Pro Football Reference

Vashone LaRay Adams (born September 12, 1973) is an American former professional football player who was a safety in the National Football League (NFL) for the Cleveland Browns, Baltimore Ravens, New Orleans Saints, Kansas City Chiefs and Dallas Cowboys. He played college football for the Fort Hays State Tigers and Eastern Michigan Eagles.

== Early life ==
Adams attended Overland High School, where he was a two-way player at running back and cornerback. He accepted a football scholarship from Fort Hays State University, where he played as a cornerback.

He transferred to Butte College after his freshman season. He transferred to Eastern Michigan University after his sophomore season, where he was a two-year starter at safety.

== Professional career ==
Adams was signed as an undrafted free agent by the Cleveland Browns after the 1995 NFL draft. He was waived on August 21 and signed to the practice squad in September. He was promoted to the active roster on November 4. As a rookie, he played in eight games, starting six of them at free safety.

In 1996, the Browns were relocated to Baltimore, Maryland. Although the original Browns name and the team's records would remain in Cleveland, Ohio, the club became the Baltimore Ravens, an official NFL expansion franchise. Adams appeared in 16 games (2 starts at free safety), registering the only interception of his career in a game against the Pittsburgh Steelers. He wasn't re-signed after the season.

In 1997, he signed as a free agent with the New Orleans Saints. He earned the starting strong safety position in preseason. He appeared in 5 games, earning 4 starts and making his only forced fumble. On September 29, he was released after Sammy Knight surpassed him on the depth chart and became the new starting strong safety.

On April 7, 1998, he was signed by the Kansas City Chiefs as a free agent. He was placed on the injured reserve list on August 30. He wasn't re-signed after the season.

On December 15, 1999, he was signed by the Dallas Cowboys. He was declared inactive for the last 3 regular season games and the NFC Wild Card Playoff contest against the Minnesota Vikings. He wasn't re-signed after the season.
