= Clay DeBord =

American football player (born 1992)

Profile
- Position: Guard

Personal information
- Born: May 13, 1992 (age 34); Lewiston, Idaho
- Listed height: 6 ft 6 in (1.98 m)
- Listed weight: 305 lb (138 kg)

Career information
- High school: Asotin (WA)
- College: Eastern Washington
- NFL draft: 2016: undrafted

Career history
- Arizona Cardinals (2016)*; New England Patriots (2016)*; Dallas Cowboys (2016–2017)*
- * Offseason or practice squad member only

Awards and highlights
- Second-Team All-Big Sky (2014); FCS First-Team All-American (2015)
- Stats at Pro Football Reference

Clay DeBord (born May 13, 1992) is an American former football offensive guard. He played college football at Eastern Washington University. He signed with the Arizona Cardinals out of college and also played for the New England Patriots and the Dallas Cowboys.

== Early life ==
DeBord attended Asotin High School in Asotin, Washington where he earned All-Southeast 2B League honors as a senior and he helped guide Asotin to a 3-2 league record and 5-3 overall mark. In his junior year, Asotin finished 5-1 in the league and 8-1 overall.

== College career ==
During his time at Eastern Washington University (EWU), DeBord recorded a school record of 51 career starts. As a freshman in the 2012 season DeBord started in 13 games at left offensive tackle due to being redshirted but missed a Sacramento State game with an ankle injury.

He made his debut start against Idaho and helped Eastern Washington rank seventh in the FCS in passing yards per game with a record of 318.9. As a sophomore in the 2013 season Clay Debord was selected to the second-team All-Big Sky. DeBord earned team offensive player of the week after EWU's 41-19 win over Weber State where they recorded 493 yards of offense. He helped Eastern set Big Sky and school records with 592 points, 83 touchdowns and 8,002 yards of offense in the 2013 season.

In the 2014 season DeBord earned honorable mention All-Big Sky accolades after starting all 14 Eastern games at left offensive tackle. He also earned second-team all-league honors from College Sports Madness. He and left guard Aaron Neary were the team's co-offensive players of the week after helping EWU rush for 224 yards and finish with 582 total yards in a 52–51 win at Montana State. In 2015 Debord was listed as a starter at left offensive tackle on the preseason depth chart. He was a first-team selection on the STATS preseason FCS All-America team.

== Professional career ==
=== Arizona Cardinals ===
On May 2, 2016, DeBord was signed as an undrafted free agent by the Arizona Cardinals. He was waived on August 29, 2016.

=== New England Patriots ===
On September 5, 2016, DeBord was signed to the New England Patriots' practice squad. He was released on September 15.

=== Dallas Cowboys ===
On September 28, 2016, DeBord was signed to the Dallas Cowboys' practice squad. He was released on November 8. On January 17, 2017, he signed a reserve/future contract with the Cowboys.

On September 2, 2017, DeBord was waived by the Cowboys.

== Retirement ==
On September 3, 2017, DeBord announced his retirement from the NFL.

== Personal life ==
DeBord is a technology major. He was born May 13, 1992, in Lewiston, Idaho. His parents are Levirn DeBord and Martha MacNeil.
