= Cherokee Trail High School =

School in Aurora, Colorado, US

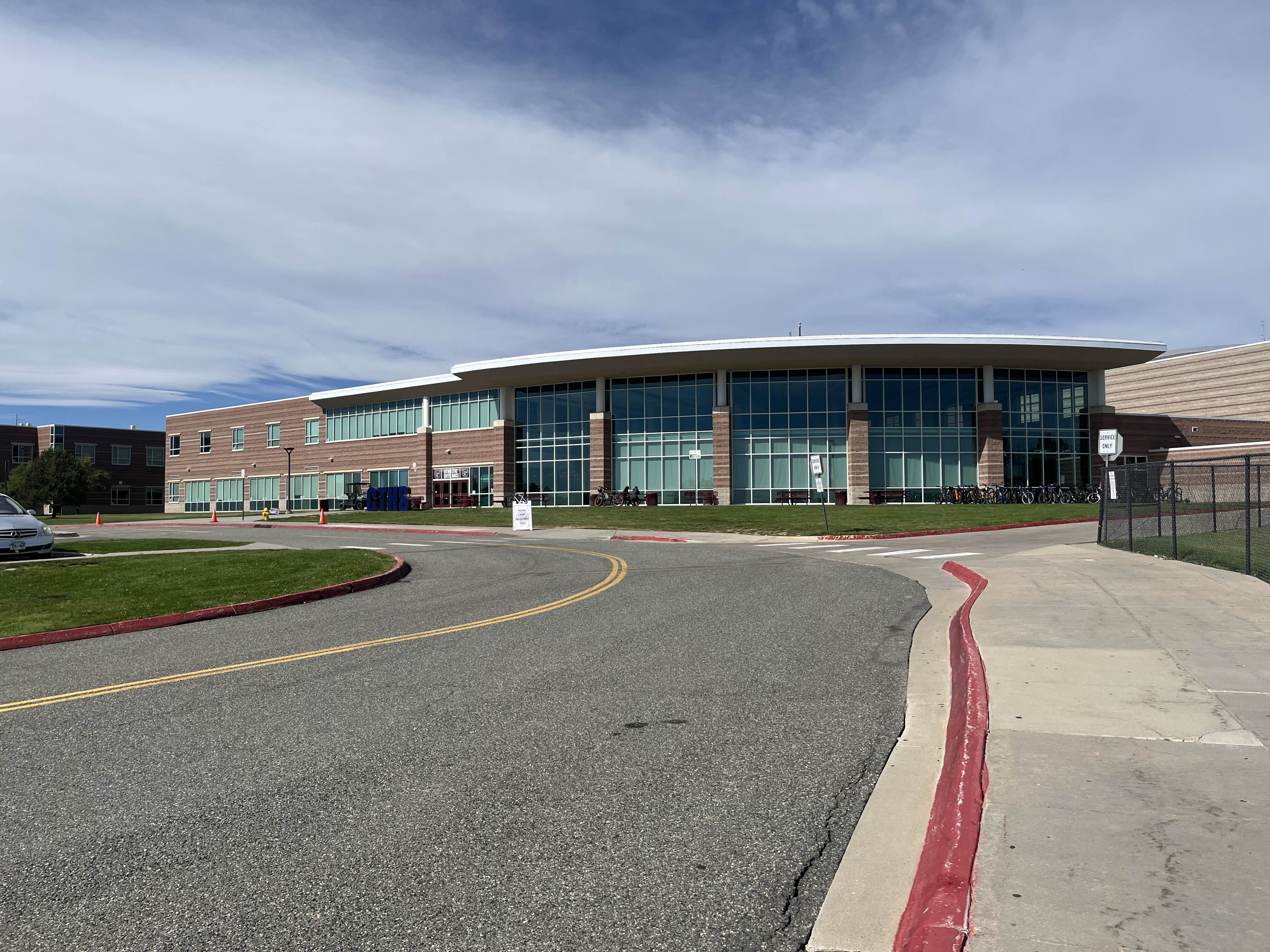

Location
- 25901 East Arapahoe Road; Aurora, Colorado 80016; United States; 39°35′30″N 104°41′11″W

Information
- School type: Public high school
- Established: 2003; 23 years ago
- School district: Cherry Creek 5
- CEEB code: 060086
- NCES School ID: 080291001951
- Principal: Julian Jones
- Teaching staff: 158.80 (on an FTE basis)
- Grades: 9–12
- Enrollment: 3,059 (2023–24)
- Student to teacher ratio: 19.26
- Colors: Burgundy and navy
- Athletics conference: CHSAA
- Mascot: Cougar
- Website: cherokeetrail.cherrycreekschools.org

Cherokee Trail High School (CTHS) is a public secondary school located in the southeastern portion of the city of Aurora, Colorado, United States. It is the sixth high school to open in the Cherry Creek School District and is accredited by the Colorado Department of Education. Cherokee Trail is an International Baccalaureate certified school, and its stated mission is "to ignite the genius and nurture the goodness within us all."

== History ==
Cherokee Trail High School opened in 2003 as the sixth comprehensive high school in the Cherry Creek School District, designed to serve the rapidly growing residential communities of southeastern Aurora near the Aurora Reservoir. When the school first opened, it served an inaugural class of approximately 600 students; enrollment has since grown to more than 3,000 students, making it one of the largest high schools in Colorado by student count. The school's first librarian, hired in 2002 to help open the campus, was previously a librarian at Smoky Hill High School and an English teacher at Cherry Creek High School.

The school has been led by Principal Julian Jones since the 2025–2026 school year, following the retirement of longtime principal Jean (Griego-)Incitti at the conclusion of the 2024–25 school year after eight years holding the role.

== Academics ==
Cherokee Trail offers a comprehensive college- and career-preparatory curriculum and is one of two International Baccalaureate (IB) Diploma Programme high schools in the Cherry Creek School District, the other being Smoky Hill High School. In addition to the full IB Diploma Programme, the school offers 28 Advanced Placement (AP) courses, 29 IB courses, 18 concurrent- and dual-enrollment courses, and a selection of Honors/Pre-AP/Pre-IB courses. Career and Technical Education (CTE) coursework is available both on the CTHS campus and through the Cherry Creek Innovation Campus (CCIC), a district-wide career pathways facility.

During the 2024–25 school year, 193 students sat for 602 IB examinations, with 94% of IB candidates earning the full IB Diploma. In the same year, 1,111 students took 1,995 AP examinations, with 84% scoring a 3 or higher. Cherokee Trail has been recognized as an AP Honor Roll School and recipient of the AP Access Award, and 829 students completed at least one concurrent-enrollment course for college credit.

The SAT school-day mean for the Class of 2025 was 1071 (545 Evidence-Based Reading and Writing; 526 Math), compared with a district composite mean of 1046. The school posted a 97% graduation rate for the Class of 2025. Postsecondary outcomes for that class included 67% enrolling in a four-year college or university, 9% in a two-year or community college, 6% in career and technical education, 13% entering the workforce, 3% enlisting in the military, and 2% taking a gap year.

The school's grading system uses a weighted 5.0 scale for AP, Pre-AP, Honors, IB, and Pre-IB courses. To graduate, students must earn a minimum of 22 credits across English (4), mathematics (3), science (3), social studies (3), practical/fine arts/CTE (1.5), health and wellness (2.0), and electives (5.5), and must demonstrate competency in Reading/Writing/Communication and Mathematics.

== Demographics ==
According to the school's 2025–2026 profile, Cherokee Trail serves approximately 3,156 students, with about 824 students in the Class of 2026. The demographic breakdown is as follows:

- White – 51%
- Latino/a – 19%
- Black/African American – 11%
- Asian – 10%
- Multiple Races – 8%
- Hawaiian/Pacific Islander – <1%
- Central/Native American – <1%

For the 2023–24 school year, the National Center for Education Statistics reported a total enrollment of 3,059 students with 158.80 full-time-equivalent teachers, for a student–teacher ratio of approximately 19:1.

== Athletics ==
Cherokee Trail competes in the Colorado High School Activities Association (CHSAA) and offers a full program of boys', girls', and co-ed sports across three seasons. CTHS teams compete primarily at the 5A classification, the state's largest.

The Fall sports slate includes cross country, field hockey, flag football (girls), football, golf (boys), gymnastics, soccer (boys), softball, spirit (cheer and dance), tennis (boys), and volleyball (girls). Winter sports include basketball (boys and girls), ice hockey (boys), swimming and diving (girls), wrestling (boys and girls), and Unified basketball. Spring sports include baseball, golf (girls), lacrosse (boys and girls), soccer (girls), swimming and diving (boys), tennis (girls), track and field, Unified track, and volleyball (boys), as well as speech and debate.

Cherokee Trail is home to Legacy Stadium, a 7,500-seat district stadium that is one of the largest high-school stadiums in Colorado. The facility features an artificial turf field, ticket booths, broadcast cabling and A/V equipment, and modern architecture; it is shared among Cherry Creek School District high schools for varsity events. The campus also houses a 25-yard competition swimming pool with a 12-foot diving well and two one-meter diving boards, multiple tennis courts, soccer fields, a softball field, and two baseball diamonds.

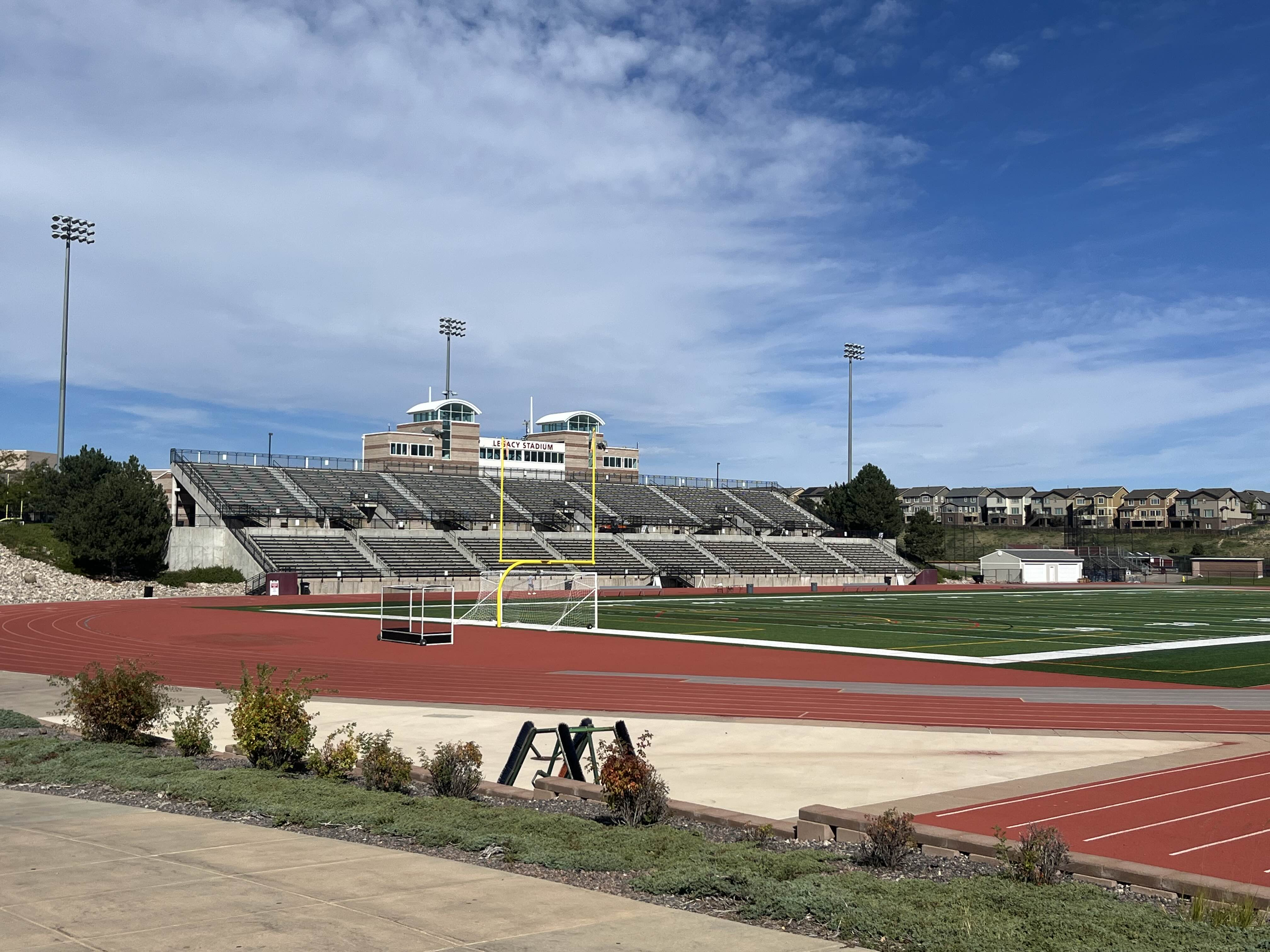
View of the home stands at Legacy Stadium, located on the CTHS campus.

State championships won by Cherokee Trail teams and athletes include:

- 2007 – Boys' track and field (Class 4A) and baseball (Class 4A) state championships.
- 2024 – CHSAA Esports State Championship in League of Legends.
- 2025 – CHSAA 5A Boys' Golf state championship (team title).
- 2025 – CHSAA Spirit state championship in Jazz (the program's second consecutive Jazz title).

== Activities and clubs ==
Cherokee Trail's Activities Office coordinates more than 50 student clubs and a range of co-curricular activities, supported by faculty and staff sponsors. Offerings span academic and honor societies, career and technical student organizations (such as DECA), performing and visual arts groups, student government, special-interest clubs, and a school news publication (CT Today). The school also fields competitive activities sanctioned by CHSAA, including speech and debate and esports.

The school's student-body programming includes assemblies, homecoming and prom dances, school spirit events, and "Cougar Nation" campaigns run through the Activities Office and student leadership.

== Campus ==
The Cherokee Trail campus sits on a 25901 East Arapahoe Road site in southeast Aurora, near the Aurora Reservoir. In addition to Legacy Stadium and the aquatic center, the campus includes specialized facilities for career and technical education, visual and performing arts, and sciences. CTHS also serves as a host site for district-wide events and athletic contests. Student parking is split between an upper (west) lot reserved for staff and visitors and a lower (east) lot used by students and stadium patrons.

Through a partnership with the district-wide Cherry Creek Innovation Campus (CCIC), CTHS students may enroll in advanced CTE pathways—such as advanced manufacturing, automotive, health sciences, IT, and hospitality—that appear on the CTHS transcript while being delivered at the CCIC facility.

== Notable recognition ==
- In 2026, Cherokee Trail senior Subira Abuaba was selected as one of two Colorado delegates to the United States Senate Youth Program.
- In April 2026, Cherokee Trail wrestler Cooper Mathews was named AuroraTV's Cherry Creek School District Athlete of the Month.
