= Nura Afia =

American beauty vlogger and model

- Born: February 9, 1993 (age 33); Denver, Colorado, U.S.
- Occupations: Makeup artist; model; vlogger and YouTube personality
- Spouse: Asef Noorzai (m. 2011)
- Children: 2

YouTube information
- Channel: Nura Afia
- Years active: 2011–present
- Genres: Beauty and makeup; vlogs
- Subscribers: 207 thousand
- Views: 14 million
- Last updated: February 16, 2026

Nura Afia (born February 9, 1993) is an American beauty vlogger. In November 2016, CoverGirl cosmetics company named her one of its brand ambassadors. Afia is the CoverGirl's first brand ambassador who wears a hijab.

== Early life ==
Afia grew up in Aurora, Colorado, with five siblings, and attended Smoky Hill High School. Her mother, Anne, was a Swiss born Lebanese Christian women who, converted to Islam prior to marrying Afia's father, who is Moroccan. In 2011, when she was 18, Afia married Asef Noorzai, a childhood friend.

== Career ==
While at home with her first baby in 2011 named Laila Noorzai, Afia began watching beauty videos online. She was inspired to start recording her own videos, using electronics borrowed from family. Over time she grew her channels to reach 213,000 YouTube subscribers and 300,000 Instagram followers. Afia also began to do photo shoots and work with modest fashion brands.

In November 2016, as part of a campaign to feature models from diverse backgrounds, CoverGirl cosmetics named Afia as a brand ambassador. She was the first hijab-wearing model to be a brand ambassador for CoverGirl when she began modeling their new mascara product called "So Lashy! BlastPro." She received many messages of support from Muslim women pleased to see a model in a hijab, however she was also criticised as hypocritical for both covering up with a hijab and seeking attention through make-up.
