= Aurora Reservoir =

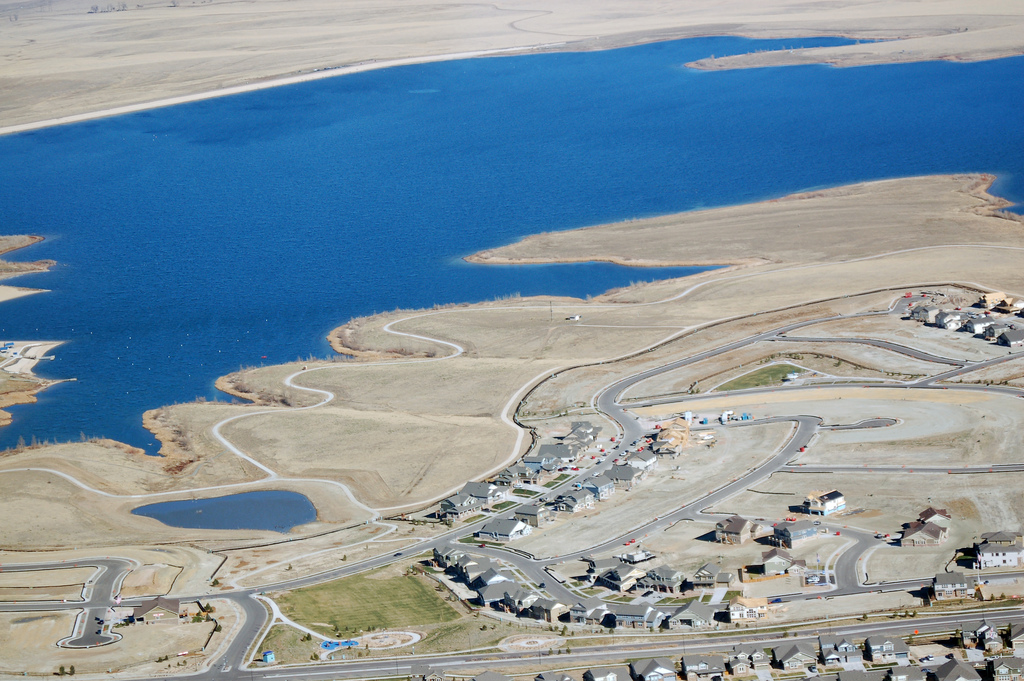

- Location within Colorado Location within the United States
- Location: Aurora, Colorado
- Coordinates: 39°37′09″N 104°39′40″W
- Type: Reservoir
- Primary inflows: Senac Creek
- Basin countries: United States
- Max. length: 2.2 mi (3.5 km)
- Max. width: 1.6 mi (2.6 km)
- Surface area: 800 acres (3.2 km^{2})
- Water volume: 39×10^{6} m^{3} (32,000 acre⋅ft)
- Surface elevation: 5,950 ft (1,810 m)

Aurora Reservoir is a 31,650 acre-foot (39,040,000 m^{3}) reservoir located in the far southeastern reach of Aurora, Colorado. Senac Creek and other minor streams flow into the reservoir's three coves, Senac, Marina and Lone Tree, each pointing to the south. The reservoir provides drinking water to the City of Aurora and is also a recreation area.

== History ==
Aurora Reservoir was built in 1989 at a cost of 41 million dollars and was filled in 1990. The reservoir is used for recreation and to provide water for Aurora, CO, and surrounding communities. Miles of undeveloped prairie originally separated the reservoir from the city's neighborhoods, and its location has been referred to as "Aurora's Outback". However, over 3,500 new homes in the two new suburban communities, Beacon Point and Southshore are currently under construction immediately southwest of the reservoir, in addition to much other development in the area including the Southlands Lifestyle Center (approx 2 miles (3.2 km) west of the reservoir), Cherokee Trail High School and Fox Ridge Middle School (1/2 mile southwest) and thousands of other homes in the vicinity.

== Recreation ==
The rapid Southeastern expansion of the Denver–Aurora Metropolitan Area has greatly increased attendance and awareness of the reservoir. Many recreational opportunities exist at Aurora Reservoir. There is a small swim beach open seasonally, boat dock, rental equipment shack, 8.5-mile (13.7 km) jogging/biking trail, designated SCUBA diving beach/area in water, and many opportunities for fishermen. In order to protect the purity of the water, only electric boats are allowed, thus limiting full recreational use of the reservoir. Surprisingly, the reservoir is also a relatively popular diving site, largely due to the separate SCUBA beach and designated area in the far Northeastern corner of the lake and also because of a Cessna 310, deliberately sunk in 1994 as a diving attraction, visible at only 30 feet (9.1 m) below the surface. Not surprisingly, it is a popular location for local SCUBA centers to take dive students for their open-water certification. More recently, the reservoir has also become a reputable fishing spot mainly for Trout, Walleye and Catfish, and has truly been in the limelight lately regarding the record for largest catfish caught in Colorado being set at the reservoir in October 2010. The reservoir also hosts a number of community events throughout the year including triathlons, sailing camps, and other local functions.
