= Benjamin Levy (musician) =

American musician

- Born: 1980 (age 45–46); Cooperstown, New York, U.S.
- Genre: Classical
- Instruments: Double bass

Benjamin Levy (born 1980) is an American classical musician who plays double bass.

== Early life and education ==
Levy was born in Cooperstown, New York, in 1980 and grew up in Pennsylvania and Colorado. He attended Cherry Creek High School in Greenwood Village, Colorado, and spent two summers at the Aspen Music Festival. He earned a Bachelor of Music degree in double bass performance from the New England Conservatory of Music in 2002.

== Career ==
Levy has appeared in performance with soprano Dawn Upshaw, the Borromeo String Quartet, and the Hawthorne String Quartet. In 2002, while a Fellow at the Tanglewood Music Center, Mr. Levy was the recipient of the Maurice Schwartz Prize and was reviewed in The New York Times for his performance of Jacob Druckman's "Valentine" on solo double bass. A 2002 graduate of the New England Conservatory, Levy joined the bass section of the Boston Symphony Orchestra at the start of the 2003 Tanglewood season. He is also the coordinator of the Double Bass Seminar at the Boston Conservatory. Levy's teachers have included David Potter, Todd Seeber, Timothy Pitts, Paul Ellison, and Stuart Sankey.
