= Asotin Junior Senior High School =

School in Asotin, Washington, U.S.

Coordinates: 46°20′24″N 117°03′07″W

Asotin Junior-Senior High School

Location
- 215 2nd St; Asotin, Washington 99402

Information
- Grades: 9–12
- Enrollment: 306 (2023–2024)
- Color
- Mascot: Panther

Asotin Junior-Senior High School (Asotin High School or AHS) is a four-year public high school located in Asotin, Washington, United States. The school enrolls 250–300 students and holds grades 9–12.

The school mascot is the Panther. The school colors are orange, black and white.

== Athletics ==
Asotin High School offers a variety of sports, clubs and activities throughout the school year. Sports offered in the fall include cross country, football, and volleyball. Winter sports include boys' basketball and girls' basketball. Spring sports include baseball, softball, track and golf.

== State championships ==
- 1985 Baseball
- 1990 Girls' Basketball
- 2006 Football
- 2009 Boys' Golf
- 2013 Boys' Track and Field
- 2019 Girls' Track and Field
- 2019 Baseball

== Other activities offered ==
- FCCLA (Family Career And Community Leaders of America), for students interested in family and consumer science education
- FFA (Future Farmers of America), for students interested in agricultural studies
- National Honor Society, for students with high academic achievement, and focuses on community service
- FBLA (Future Business Leaders of America)
- Cheerleading, for students interested in cheering, stunts and tumbling at school sports games
- Student Council, for students interested in learning leadership skills while working with the school administration
- Concert Band/Choir
- Jazz Band/Choir
- AHS participates yearly in the national Junior Miss scholarship program, in which eleventh-grade girls are eligible to take part.

== Awards ==
- Asotin High School was given the 2007-08 School of Distinction Award from the State of Washington.
