= Ralston Valley High School =

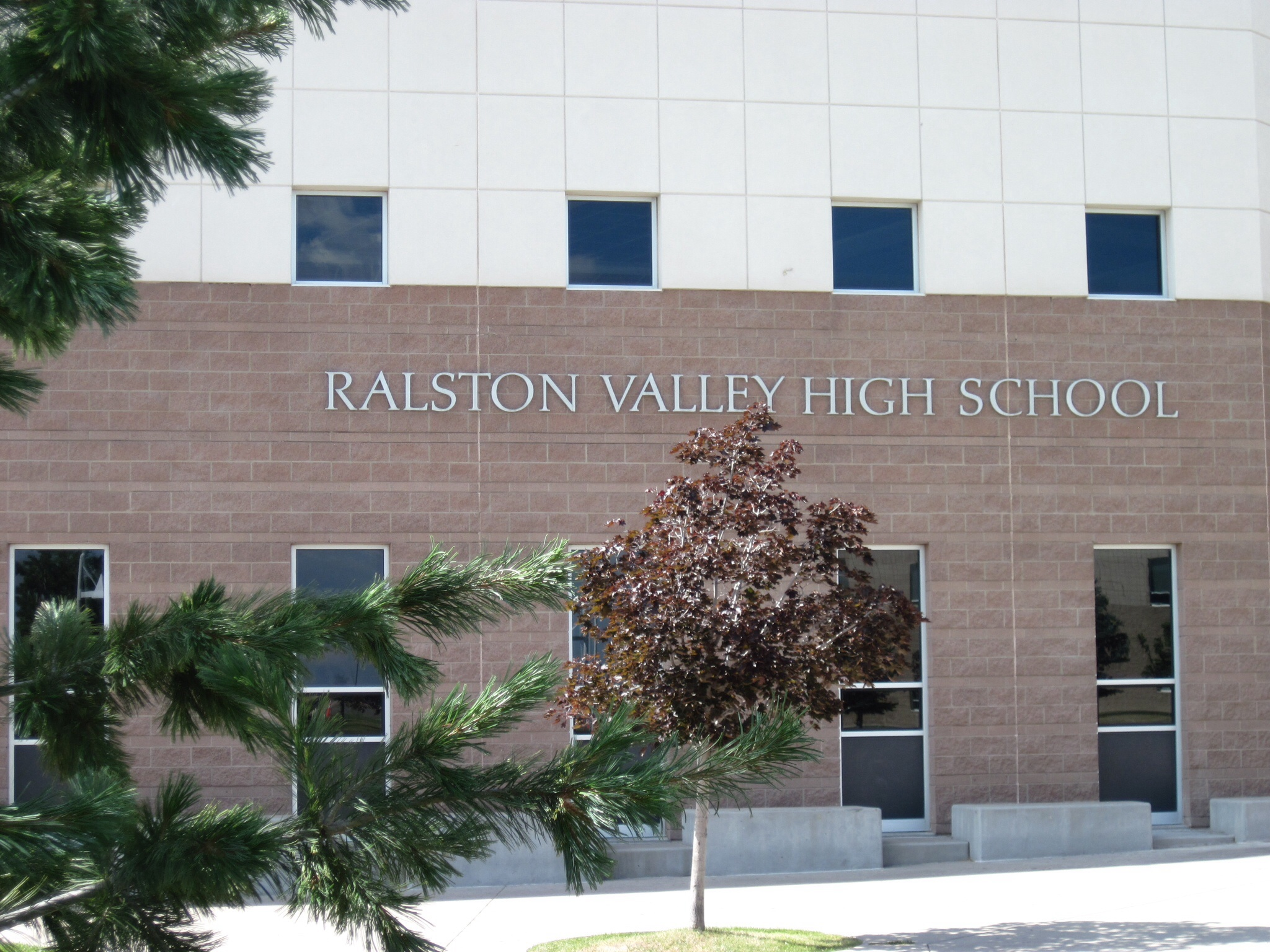
- School exterior

Location
- 13355 West 80th Avenue; Arvada, Colorado 80005; United States; 39°50′35″N 105°09′00″W

Information
- Type: Public secondary school
- Motto: Challenge yourself to be a person others admire.
- Established: 2000 (26 years ago)
- School district: Jefferson County R-1
- CEEB code: 060051
- NCES School ID: 080480001797
- Principal: Mica Buenning
- Teaching staff: 90.12 (on an FTE basis)
- Grades: 9–12
- Enrollment: 1,875 (2023–2024)
- Student to teacher ratio: 20.81
- Campus size: 54 acres (220,000 m^{2})
- Colors: Navy blue, Carolina blue, silver
- Athletics: 5A
- Athletics conference: Jefferson County League
- Mascot: Mustang
- Rivals: Pomona High School, Arvada West High School
- Website: ralstonvalley.jeffcopublicschools.org

Ralston Valley High School (RVHS or RV) is a comprehensive, four-year public high school in Arvada, a northwest suburb of Denver, Colorado. Opened in 2000, its enrollment is around 1800 students.

Ralston Valley High School is an eight-time recipient of an "Excellent" rating by the Colorado Department of Education.

== History ==
The 24th public high school built in Jefferson County, Ralston Valley's opening relieved Arvada West High School, which was serving students in 1999, was on a split schedule. Groundbreaking occurred in March 1999, and the school opened in the fall of 2000. With the exception of a few years when the award program was discontinued after 2019, RVHS has received the Colorado Department of Education's John Irwin School of Excellence Award every year 2005–2019.

The mascot of Ralston Valley is the mustang. It was selected based on votes from local elementary and middle school students in Jefferson County, as well as Arvada West HS students who would be attending RVHS. The mascot is significant to the location of the school, which is located on land that was formerly a ranch that raised and bred horses. Part of this ranch still exists across the street from the southern edge of campus.

== Curriculum ==
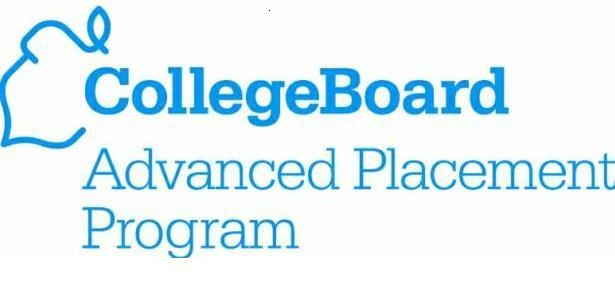

College preparation is the focus in all RVHS classes. RVHS offers Advanced Placement courses for all grade levels. Students may opt to pursue an Honors Diploma.

== Campus ==
The school building, situated on a 54-acre (220,000 m^{2}) site in northwest Arvada, was designed by LKA Partners and won a Merit Award in 2002 from the Colorado chapter of the American Institute of Architects.

In March 2007, the school finished additional construction for expansion. This consisted of the addition of 47,700 sq ft (4,430 m^{2}) of classroom and science labs to the east side of the building as well as 45,700 sq ft (4,250 m^{2}) of classroom and more science labs to the south side. This renovation closed off the lower level in a full square to connect the science, math and (new) foreign language halls. The Ralston Valley High School addition and remodel includes 170,000 square feet of new construction and 42,000 square feet of remodeling. The project entailed demolition of the existing academic and administration areas and the redevelopment of the site. The new facility has 44 general classrooms, 12 science classrooms, library, media area, auxiliary gym, administration area, kitchen, commons and a remodeled art department and locker rooms. The 28.5-acre site offers soccer, softball and multi-use fields.

Further renovations included the addition of 10,443-square-foot (970.2 m^{2}) resulting in an auxiliary gym with a bleacher mezzanine, weight room and expanded athletic locker rooms. RVHS has the Millikan oil-drop experiment equipment along with the equipment for finding the mass of an electron.

Additional improvements:

- Darkroom
- Orchestra pit in the auditorium
- Computer lab
- Expanded student commons
- New athletic practice field
- Publications lab
- Expanded parking
- Solar panels

Construction began in December 2005, was completed in September 2007, and cost $29.5 million.

In 2022, the north wing of the school was expanded for 4 new classrooms.

In 2023, a new library was constructed and additional classrooms were added in place of where the old library was.

== Principals ==
- Jon Donaldson (2000–2004)
- Jim Ellis (2004–2014)
- Gavan Goodrich (2014–2018)
- Mica Buenning (2018–)

== Extracurricular activities and classes ==
=== School publications ===
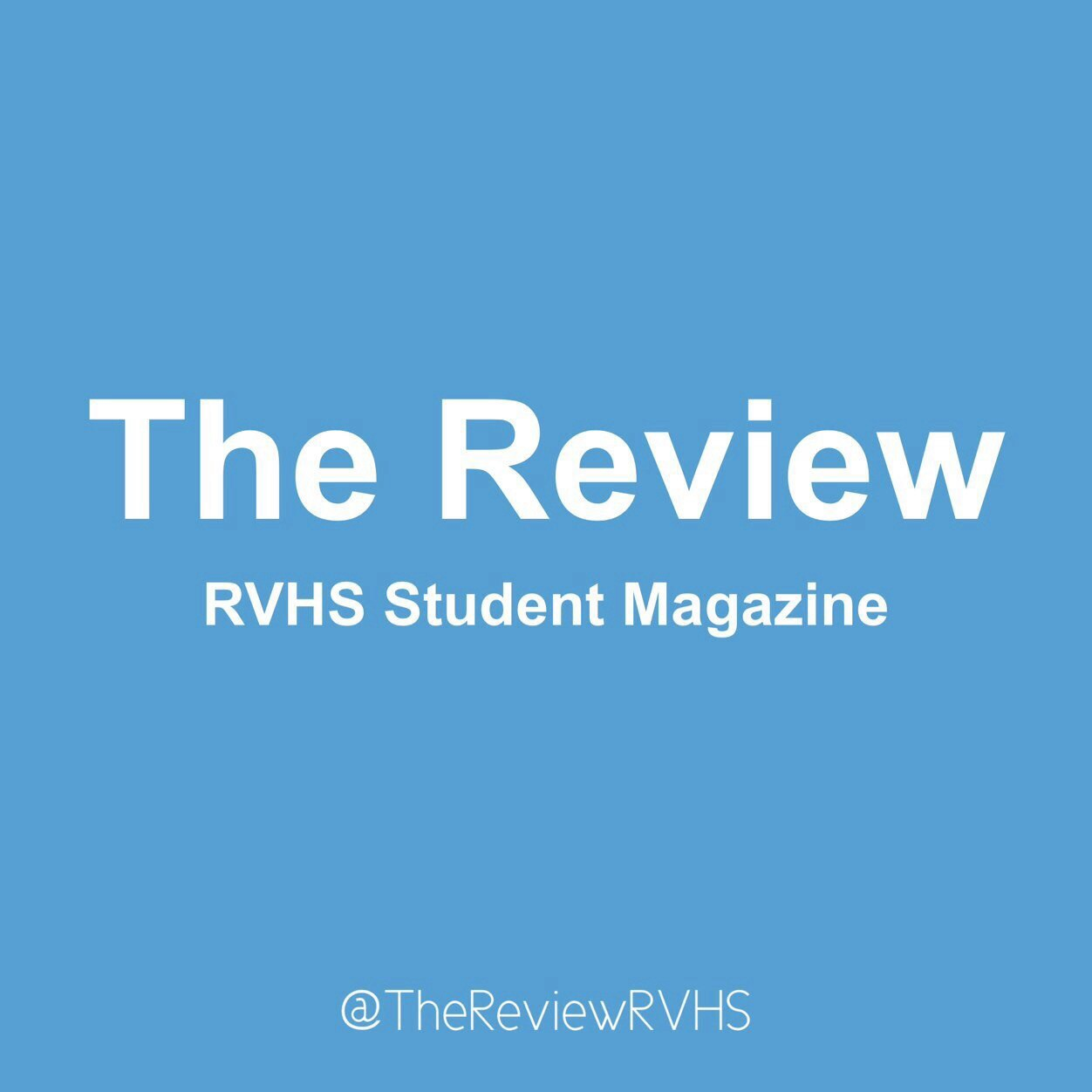
The Review's Logo

- The Review magazine (2013–): The Review is the student publication of Ralston Valley High School. It is published quarterly and features sports photography and school news.
- The Stampede yearbook (2000–): yearly published student produced yearbook
- Former student newspaper: The Ralston Valley [e]Xpress (2000–2013)
- RVTV: Digital weekly rally news, produces recordings of sports events, theatrical productions, and general activities (2022–)

=== Athletics ===
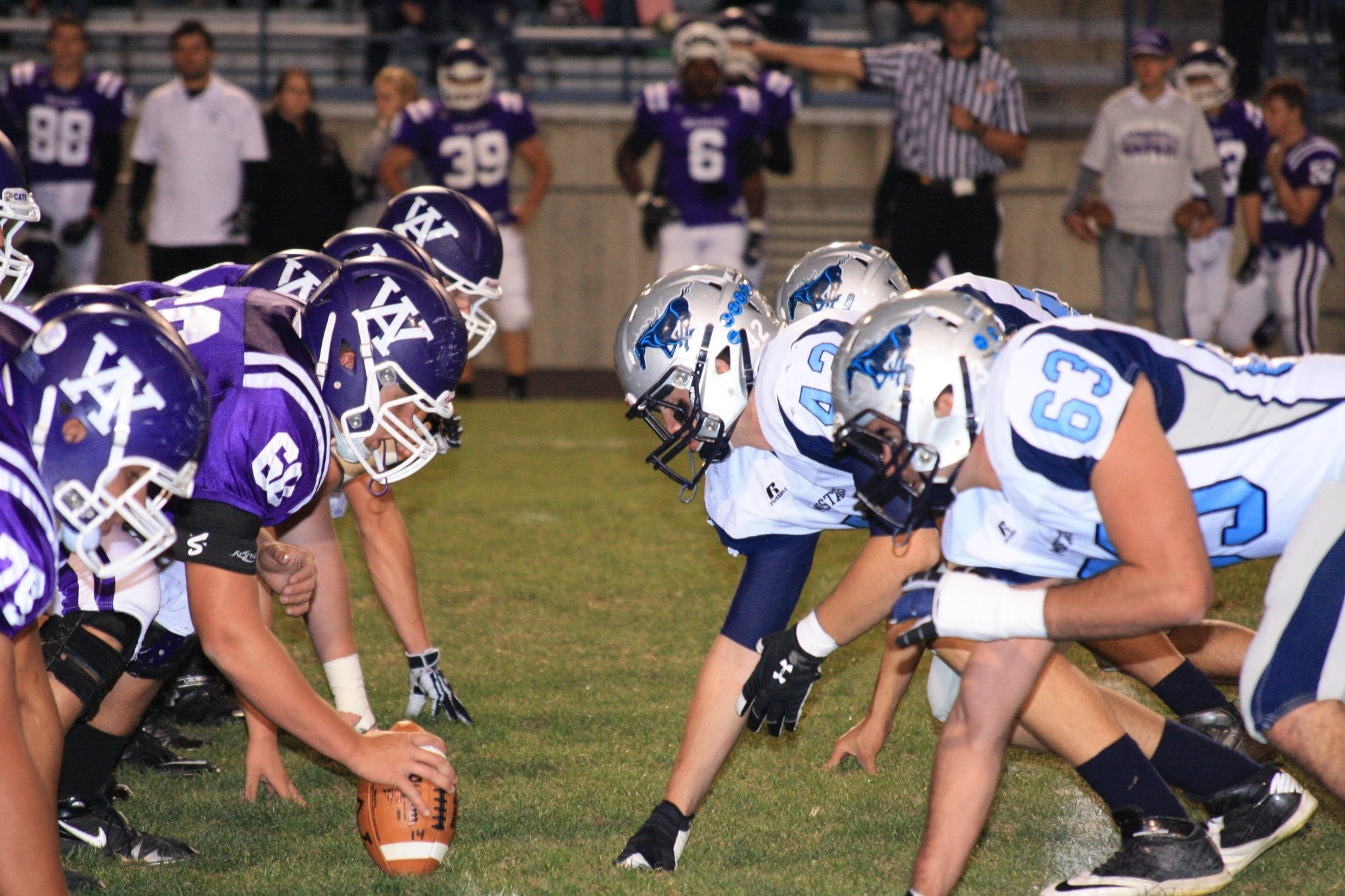
Ralston Valley vs. area rival, Arvada West

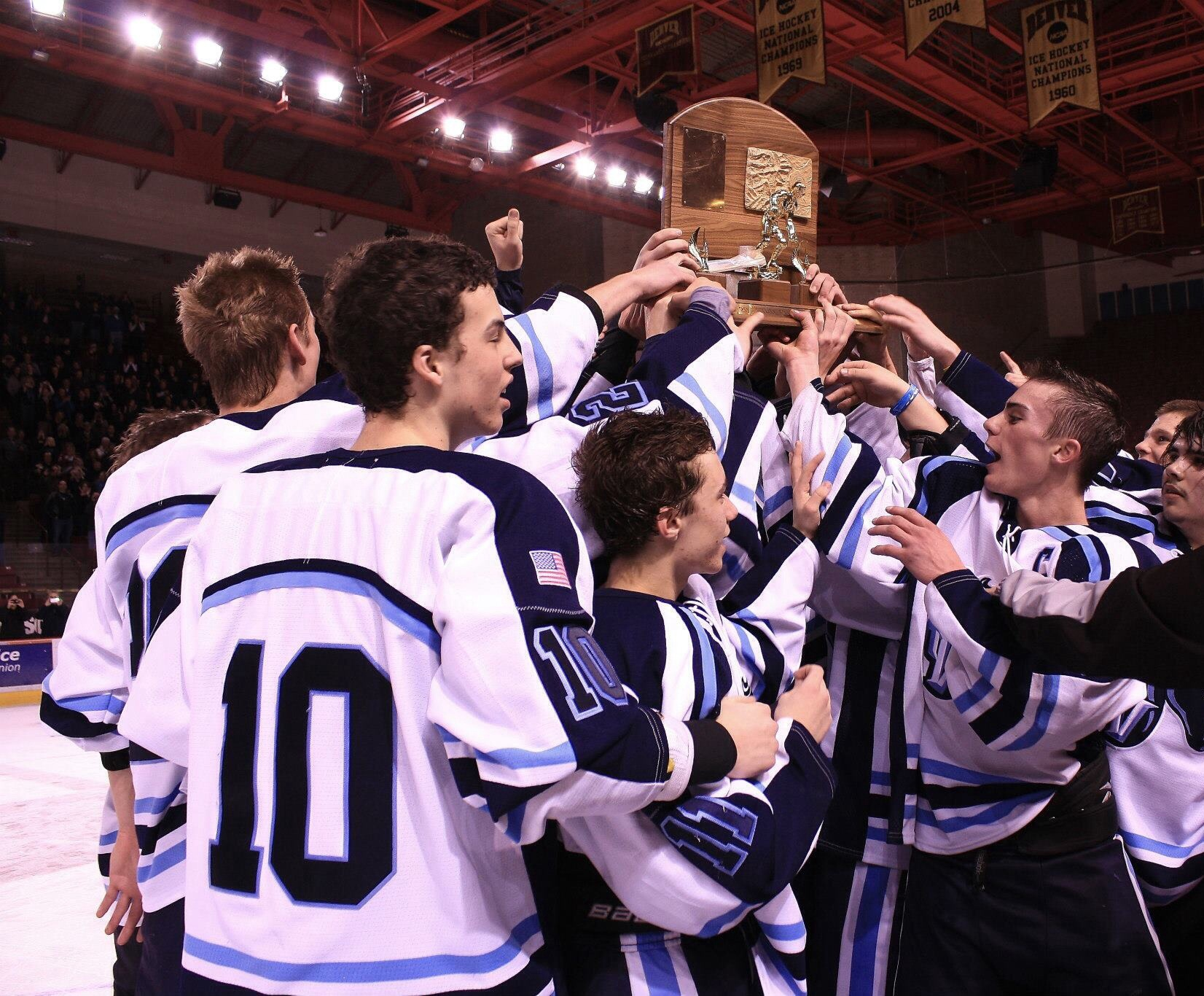
RV's hockey team hoists up the state championship trophy in 2013.

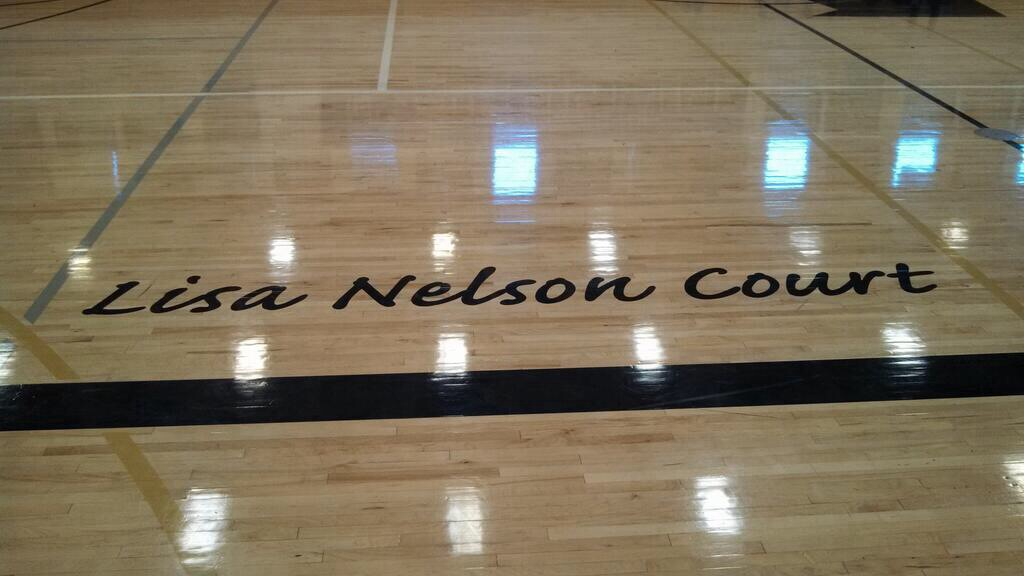
The basketball court named after Lisa Nelson, who died in 2013 after fighting cancer.

Ralston Valley has won 12 state championship titles. The most recent are in 2 in girls tennis (2024 and 2025) girls' golf, softball, boys' basketball, baseball, swimming & diving, coed cheerleading, and poms. The Mustangs have won 74 Jeffco league championships in 13 different sports. The school has received the Steinmark Award competing in the Jeffco league. The Steinmark is awarded to the school with the top overall athletic performance in the league. Ralston Valley seniors have received athletic scholarships at Division I and II NCAA schools, along with nearly every US service academy.

Ralston Valley fields teams in baseball, basketball, cheerleading, cross county, football, golf, ice hockey, girls' lacrosse, poms, soccer, softball, swimming, tennis, track and field, volleyball and wrestling in interscholastic competition.

Ralston Valley initially competed in Class 4A Athletics in every sport except football. Football initially competed in 3A in its first two seasons, before moving up a classification to 4A. The school has since moved to Class 5A (the highest level in Colorado) as of fall 2009 in all athletics.

State championships won by the school include:

- Boys' basketball: 2003 (4A)
- Coed cheerleading: 2003 (4A), 2006 (4A/5A)
- Poms: 2004 (4A)
- Baseball: 2008 (4A)
- Softball: 2002, 2008 (4A)
- Girls' golf: 2017 (5A)
- Girls' swimming: 2007, 2008, 2009 (5A)
- Boys' golf: 2008 (5A)
- Hockey: 2013, 2014 (5A); 2014: undefeated season, 23–0
- Girls Tennis: 2024, 2025 (5A) both undefeated 14–0 seasons.

The basketball court is named in honor of Lisa Nelson (coach and teacher) and the gym is named in gratitude after Jim Hynes (former athletic director and assistant principal).

== Notable alumni ==
- Mariah Bell (2014) - figure skater, national champion at 2022 U.S. Championships
- Nick Fazekas (2003) - University of Nevada, Reno basketball player; drafted 34th by Dallas Mavericks
- JJ Galbreath (2020) – NFL tight end for the Pittsburgh Steelers
- Jordan Holloway (2014) - Baseball pitcher for the Miami Marlins
- Dan Skipper (2013) - American football offensive tackle for the University of Arkansas and the Detroit Lions of the National Football League (NFL)
- Dave Welsh (2003) - electric guitar player for pop band The Fray
- Andrew Wingard (2015) - American football safety for the University of Wyoming and the Jacksonville Jaguars of the National Football League (NFL)
- Ben Wysocki (2003) - drummer for pop band The Fray
