= Cherry Creek High School =

Location
- 9300 East Union Avenue; Greenwood Village, Colorado 80111; United States; 39°37′50″N 104°52′48″W

Information
- School type: Public high school
- Established: September 6, 1955 (71 years ago)
- School district: Cherry Creek 5
- CEEB code: 060515
- NCES School ID: 080291000186
- Principal: Ryan Silva
- Teaching staff: 186.50 (on an FTE basis)
- Grades: 9–12
- Enrollment: 3,852 (2024–2025)
- Student to teacher ratio: 20.65
- Colors: Scarlet, white and royal blue
- Athletics conference: CHSAA
- Mascot: Bruin
- Newspaper: Union Street Journal
- Website: www.cherrycreekschools.org/CherryCreek

Cherry Creek High School (commonly Cherry Creek, Creek, or CCHS) is the oldest of seven high schools in the Cherry Creek School District in the Denver metropolitan area. It is located in Greenwood Village, Colorado, and is the largest high school in the Denver metro area, with an 80-acre (320,000 m^{2}) campus and approximately 3,800 students. Cherry Creek High School is ranked 16th in Colorado and 716th nationally, and ranked 2nd in Colorado for public schools behind Stargate Charter School.

== Campus ==
=== Location ===
The Cherry Creek High School campus is located in the city of Greenwood Village on East Union Avenue between Yosemite Street and Dayton Street. It is directly across the street from Cherry Creek State Park. Also located on the property are the Cherry Creek School District's West Admissions building, West Maintenance building, and Education Service Center. It is adjacent to the buildings and campus of Campus Middle School and Belleview Elementary School, both of which feed into the high school.

=== Facilities ===
The campus contains four buildings (West, Information Center, Fine Arts, and East) with 170 classrooms; 3 gyms North, South and East gyms; eight tennis courts; a baseball diamond; two practice football fields; Stutler Bowl, Creek's stadium; and a challenge course. The West Building, by far the largest of the four, houses two gyms; a swimming pool; a weight room; Shillinglaw Lecture Center; and the West Cafeteria. The Information Center Building has a library and technology center, the Registrar's Office, the Counseling and Post-Grad Center, and another cafeteria. Connected to the IC by the "IC Tunnel", the Fine Arts Building features a large theater, music labs, the debate room, and art studios. The East Building contains a gym, the ILC (Intensive Learning Center) and the main security office The sprawling campus is meant to evoke a large "college-like" feel in order to prepare students for college life.

The campus also includes the historic Cherry Creek Schoolhouse, a relocated 1874 school building preserved by the school's Key Club chapter.

== Demographics ==
The demographic breakdown of the 3,797 students enrolled in 2022–2023 was:

- Male - 52.8%
- Female - 47.2%
- Native American/Alaska Native - 0.5%
- Asian - 11.8%
- Black - 4.9%
- Hispanic - 13.1%
- Native Hawaiian/Pacific Islander - 9.2%
- White - 63.4%
- Two or more races - 6.1%

13.4% of the students were eligible for free or reduced lunch.

== Academics ==
Cherry Creek High School offers Advanced Placement (AP) exams in 31 subject areas. In 2007, 906 students took 2,374 AP exams, and 87% of the students scored 3 or higher (considered passing). The next year 986 students took 2,240 AP exams, 88% scoring 3 or higher. Creek has been recognized as one of the nation's top high schools for AP participation in math, science, and technology, receiving the 2008 Advanced Placement Siemens Award. Creek is also the only school in Colorado to have offered AP French Literature every year, until the test was discontinued.

== Activities ==
Cherry Creek High School offers more than 100 activity organizations, the majority of which are open to all students. Many are nationally recognized, including the Union Street Journal, Fine Print, the Speech and Debate Team, Amnesty International, Key Club, and Future Business Leaders of America.

The school's DECA chapter took 75 students to the national competition in May 2009, the most students any high school has ever brought to the competition in the history of DECA. The Speech and Debate Team is one of the top twenty in the nation and part of “The 400" society, the top one-half of one percent of the National Speech and Debate Association school speech programs. Cherry Creek hosts an annual Model U.N. competition.

Cherry Creek's Wind Ensemble was selected as a featured ensemble at the 2014 Music For All National Concert Band Festival in Indianapolis, Indiana. In 2014 Cherry Creek was selected as a Grammy Signature School for commitment to music education.

The Union Street Journal has received several awards from the Colorado High School Press Association, including four first-place awards in 2007 for ad design, front-page layout, and editorial writing. The magazine received All-Columbian Honors and a Gold Medalist rating from the Columbia Scholastic Press Association for its work during the 2019-20 school year.

=== State Championships ===
State Championships
Season	Sport	No. of Championships	Year
Fall	Football	15	1982, 1983, 1986, 1990, 1991, 1994, 1995, 1996, 2014, 2019, 2020, 2021, 2022, 2024, 2025
Fall	Soccer, Boys	7	1975, 1976, 1979, 1980, 1981, 1982, 2010, 2024
Fall	Cross Country, Boys	5	1983, 1984, 1985, 1992, 2008
Fall	Cross Country, Girls	2	1996, 2006
Fall	Volleyball	5	1989, 1992, 1997, 1998, 2008
Fall	Field Hockey, Girls	2	2002, 2007
Fall	Golf, Boys	8	1957, 1958, 1970, 1971, 1972, 1973, 1974, 1981
Fall	Tennis, Boys	47	1972–1990, 1992–1999, 2001–2009, 2011-2016, 2020-2024
Fall	Gymnastics, Girls	3	1993, 1995, 1998
Winter	Swimming, Girls	31	1974–1979, 1981–1986, 1991, 1995–2000, 2005–2010, 2021-2024
Winter	Wrestling	1	1991
Winter	Poms	8	1996, 1998, 2002, 2003, 2015, 2016, 2018, 2019
Winter	Basketball, Boys	1	1995
Winter	Ice hockey	4	1977–1979, 2015, 2025
Spring	Tennis, Girls	30	1976, 1978, 1980–1985, 1989–1992, 1994, 1995, 1997-2012
Spring	Lacrosse, Boys	12	1975, 1978, 1981, 1982, 1983, 1986, 1995, 2002, 2005, 2006, 2010, 2015, 2017, 2019, 2025
Spring	Lacrosse, Girls	11	1997, 1999, 2001, 2003, 2004, 2006–2008, 2010, 2011, 2013
Spring	Baseball	10	1983, 1992, 1995, 1996, 1997, 1998, 1999, 2012, 2024, 2025
Spring	Soccer, Girls	2	2001, 2012
Spring	Track and Field, Girls	1	2013
Spring	Rugby, Boys	1	2011
Spring	Swimming, Boys	10	1974, 1975, 1985–1991, 1994
Former	Gymnastics, Boys	5	1973, 1974, 1981, 1982, 1990
Former	Total		207

== Notable alumni ==
=== Academics ===
- Steven Gubser, professor at Princeton University, first American to win the International Physics Olympiad, received Sloan Fellowship

=== Media/film ===
- Neal Baer, executive producer for the television show Law & Order: Special Victims Unit
- Tracey Needham, actress, best known for the television shows Life Goes On and JAG
- Aron Ralston, mountain climber, author, outdoorsman, engineer, and motivational speaker who inspired the movie 127 Hours starring James Franco
- Jessica Rothe, actress, notably in Happy Death Day, Forever My Girl, Valley Girl, and Utopia
- John Wells, producer for television shows including ER and The West Wing
- Alexis Martin Woodall, executive producer for the television show American Horror Story
- Molly Ball, senior political correspondent for The Wall Street Journal

=== Music ===
- Kate & Kacey Coppola, country singer-songwriters
- Ben Levy, double bassist for the Boston Symphony Orchestra and the Boston Pops
- Mieka Pauley, singer-songwriter
- Gregory Stapp, opera singer
- Austin Wintory, film and video game composer of Grammy-nominated soundtrack for Journey

=== Politics ===
- Michael Huttner, liberal activist, political consultant, and founder of ProgressNow
- Brad Schneider, congressman from Illinois

=== Sports ===
- David Aardsma, Major League Baseball pitcher
- Tom Ashworth, offensive tackle for New England Patriots and Seattle Seahawks
- Josh Bard, former MLB catcher
- Carey Booth, college basketball player
- J.D. Brookhart, former head football coach at University of Akron
- Bobby Brown, freestyle skier, X Games gold medalist
- John Burke, Major League Baseball pitcher, first-ever draft pick of Colorado Rockies
- Devin Carter, professional basketball player, Sacramento Kings
- Amy Van Dyken, Olympic swimmer, six-time gold medalist
- Jon Embree, former University of Colorado head football coach
- Gunnar Helm, college football tight end
- Matt Iseman, host of American Ninja Warrior and Sports Soup
- Griffin Jax, pitcher for the Tampa Bay Rays, 2013 Colorado Gatorade Player of the Year awards
- Brad Lidge, former MLB closer, 2008 World Series champion
- Darnell McDonald, former MLB outfielder
- Donzell McDonald, former MLB player for New York Yankees
- Jill McGill, professional LPGA golfer
- Ben Pinkelman, USA Eagles 7's Rugby
- Tyler Polumbus, NFL offensive tackle
- Blake Purchase, college football defensive back for the Ole Miss Rebels
- Myles Purchase, professional football cornerback
- Sam Raben (born 1997), soccer player
- Mark Randall, former NBA basketball player, led Kansas Jayhawks to 1991 national championship game
- Mike Reid, PGA golfer, winner of 2005 Senior PGA Championship
- Jim Rooker, former MLB player (Detroit Tigers, Kansas City Royals, Pittsburgh Pirates)
- Michael Ruffin, forward for NBA's Portland Trail Blazers, Washington Wizards, Chicago Bulls
- Jeff Salzenstein (born 1973), tennis player
- Kyle Shanahan, NFL head coach for San Francisco 49ers
- Eve Torres, WWE Diva for Monday Night RAW
- Sean Tufts, former linebacker for Carolina Panthers
- Jonathan Vaughters, former professional cyclist
- Bill Wilkinson, former MLB player (Seattle Mariners)
- Parker Wolfe, American middle and long-distance runner

== Controversies ==
On May 11th 2025, former Cherry Creek High School teacher and assistant track and field coach Craig Clark filed a federal lawsuit claiming that Cherry Creek School District wrongfully terminated him and violated military rights that should have protected his job. He alleges that faculty at the school retaliated against him for reporting sexual harassment and discriminated against him for his military service. As of November 2025, the lawsuit is ongoing.
