= Overland High School =

Location
- 12400 East Jewell Avenue; Aurora, Colorado 80012; United States; 39°40′49″N 104°50′34″W

Information
- Type: Public secondary school
- Motto: "Blazer Great. Blazer Proud. Blazer Excellent."
- School district: Cherry Creek School District
- CEEB code: 060076
- Principal: Sybil Booker
- Teaching staff: 126.10 (FTE)
- Enrollment: 2,161 (2023-2024)
- Student to teacher ratio: 17.14
- Colors: Navy blue and kelly green
- Mascot: Blazer
- Nickname: Blazers
- Website: overland.cherrycreekschools.org

Overland High School is located in Aurora, Colorado, United States, and is part of the Cherry Creek School District.

Overland High School is a comprehensive public, suburban, college-oriented institution. It is accredited by the North Central Association of Secondary Schools and Colleges and by the Colorado Department of Education. Overland High School was selected to be on Newsweek's America's Top High Schools 2010 list.

Construction was completed on a state-of-the-art Science, Technology, Engineering and Math or IST Center, built on the esplanade between Prairie Middle School and Overland High School. The 58,000-square-foot (5,400 m^{2}) center opened in August 2011. It serves 6th through 12th graders. Programming includes areas of concentration in bio-science, computer science, medicine and information technology.

== Demographics ==
The demographic breakdown of the 2,290 students enrolled in 2013-2014 was:

- Male - 50.6%
- Female - 49.4%
- Native American/Alaskan - 0.7
- Asian/Pacific islanders - 5.7%
- Black - 31.5%
- Hispanic - 32.6%
- White - 24.3%
- Multiracial - 5.2%

== Athletics ==
=== Baseball ===
Overland High School won the Colorado 3A State Championship in 1990.

=== Basketball ===
The men's basketball team won the Colorado 5A State championship in 2015 and 2016.

=== Football ===
Overland High School won the Colorado 6A State Championship in 1993.

=== Gymnastics ===
Overland's women's gymnastics team won the Colorado State 5A championship in 2020, 2014, 2013, 2011 and 2009, as well as the 3A championship in 1984.

Overland's men's gymnastics teams were ranked number 1 in the nation in 1986 and 1987 and won three state gymnastics championships between 1985 and 1987.

=== Rugby Union ===
Overland's boys rugby team won the 1989 Rugby Colorado State Premiership title, with an undefeated record. Overland continued rugby until 1996, when the team was renamed as the Aurora Saracens."Aurora Saracens history". Aurora Youth Rugby.

=== Soccer ===
The men's soccer team won the Colorado State 5A championship in 1995, and the women's team won the 6A State championship in 1992 and 1991.

=== Track ===
The women's track team won the Colorado State 6A championship in 1994.

=== Volleyball ===
The women's volleyball team won the Colorado State 5A championship in 1994, the 6A championship in 1993 and 1990, and the 4A championship in 1986.

=== Poms ===
The Poms team won state in the fall of 2010 and 2011.

== Notable alumni ==
- Vashone Adams, former NFL safety
- Scott Bentley, '93, former NFL kicker
- T. J. Cunningham,'91, former NFL safety
- Wade Davis, former NFL football player and gay rights activist
- Eddie Gill, NBA basketball player
- Brian Givens, former MLB player
- John Grahame, '93, ice hockey goaltender
- Graham Ike, '20, basketball player
- Iman Jodeh, first Muslim member of the Colorado House of Representatives. Member of the Colorado State Senate.
- Brian Kelly, '94, NFL cornerback
- Jeffe Kennedy, author, poet
- Sean Moran, '91, former NFL defensive end
- Brendan Schaub, '01, former professional mixed martial artist and podcaster
