= Donovan Wilson (American football) =

American football player (born 1995)

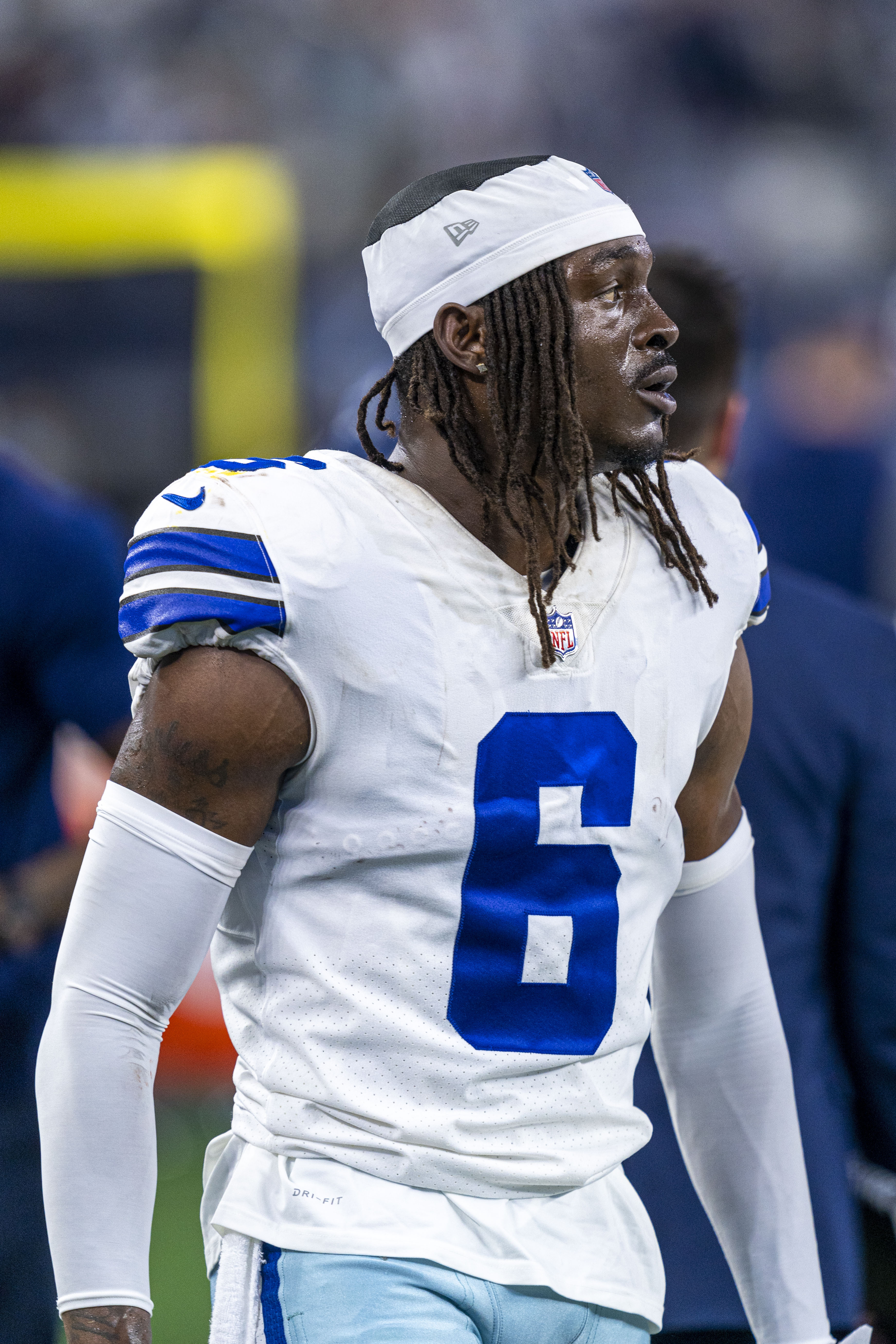
- Wilson with the Dallas Cowboys in 2021

Profile
- Position: Safety

Personal information
- Born: February 21, 1995 (age 31); Shreveport, Louisiana, U.S.
- Listed height: 6 ft 0 in (1.83 m)
- Listed weight: 204 lb (93 kg)

Career information
- High school: Woodlawn (Shreveport)
- College: Texas A&M (2014–2018)
- NFL draft: 2019: 6th round, 213th overall pick

Career history
- Dallas Cowboys (2019–2025)

Career NFL statistics as of 2025
- Total tackles: 444
- Sacks: 13.0
- Forced fumbles: 9
- Fumble recoveries: 6
- Pass deflections: 19
- Interceptions: 8
- Stats at Pro Football Reference

Donovan Junior Wilson (born February 21, 1995) is an American professional football safety. He played college football for the Texas A&M Aggies, and was drafted in the sixth round of the 2019 NFL draft by the Dallas Cowboys.

== Early life ==
Wilson attended Woodlawn High School in Shreveport, Louisiana.

== College career ==
He accepted a football scholarship from Texas A&M University. As a true freshman, he appeared in 10 games as a backup safety, making 19 tackles (2 for loss). He started in the 2014 Liberty Bowl, leading the team with 9 tackles.

As a sophomore, he started 7 games as a nickel defensive back. He collected 63 tackles (8.5 for loss), 5 interceptions (led the team), 3 pass breakups, 2 sacks, one quarterback hurry, 3 forced fumbles and 2 fumble recoveries. He had 10 tackles against the University of Mississippi.

As a junior, he started 7 games as a nickel defensive back, registering 59 tackles (5.5 for loss), one interception, 2 quarterback hurries and 2 pass breakups. He had 9 tackles both against Auburn University and Louisiana State University.

In 2017, he suffered a season-ending ankle injury in the season opener against UCLA. As a redshirt senior in 2018, he was a regular starter at safety (11 out of 12 games), posting 66 tackles (second on the team), 4.5 tackles for loss, 2 interceptions (led the team), 5 pass breakups and 2 sacks. He had 12 tackles against the University of Kentucky. He made 13 tackles (7 solo) against Louisiana State University.

== Professional career ==
=== Pre-draft ===
Wilson underwent surgery for a sports hernia injury and was recovering throughout the pre-draft process. On March 4, 2019, he attended the NFL Scouting Combine, but did not participate in any running drills due to a core-muscle injury. On March 26, 2019, Wilson performed at Texas A&M's Pro Day, but still opted not to do any running drills. He drew interest from the Dallas Cowboys and met with safeties coach Greg Jackson and assistant Ken Amato. The majority of NFL draft analysts projected him to go undrafted, but he was drafted in the sixth round by the Dallas Cowboys.

Pre-draft measurables
Height	Weight	Arm length	Hand span	Wingspan	20-yard shuttle	Three-cone drill	Vertical jump	Broad jump	Bench press
6 ft 0 in (1.83 m)	199 lb (90 kg)	33 3/8 in (0.85 m)	9 3/4 in (0.25 m)	6 ft 6 in (1.98 m)	4.38 s	6.96 s	39.0 in (0.99 m)	10 ft 7 in (3.23 m)	18 reps
All values from NFL Combine/Pro Day

=== 2019 ===
The Dallas Cowboys selected Wilson in the sixth round (213th overall) of the 2019 NFL draft. He was the 18th safety drafted. The Dallas Cowboys acquired the 2019 sixth round pick (213th overall), as well as a fifth round pick (149th overall) that they used to draft Wilson during a trade with the Cincinnati Bengals in exchange for a fourth round pick (136th overall).

External videos
- Cowboys draft Wilson 213th overall
- Secret Audio: Donovan Wilson

On May 10, 2019, the Dallas Cowboys signed Wilson to a four–year, $2.64 million contract that an initial signing bonus of $127,356. Throughout training camp, Wilson competed against Jeff Heath, George Iloka, and Kavon Frazier to be a starting strong safety. He had an impressive performance during the pre-season, producing three interceptions to secure a roster spot. Head coach Jason Garrett named Wilson the backup strong safety to begin the season, behind Jeff Heath who started alongside free safety Xavier Woods.

He was sidelined for the first two games (Weeks 1–2) due to an ankle injury. On September 22, 2019, Wilson made his professional regular season debut, but was limited to special teams as the Cowboys defeated the Miami Dolphins 31–6. In Week 10, Wilson made his first career tackle during a 24–28 loss to the Minnesota Vikings. In Week 17, he recorded his first career solo tackle during a 47–16 victory against Washington. As a rookie in 2019, Wilson appeared mainly on special teams and recorded three combined tackles (two solo) in 11 games. The Dallas Cowboys finished the 2019 NFL season with an 8–8 record and did not qualify for the playoffs, subsequently leading to the firing of head coach Jason Garrett.

=== 2020 ===
Throughout training camp under new defensive coordinator Mike Nolan, Wilson competed against Ha Ha Clinton-Dix and Darian Thompson to be a starting safety. Head coach Mike McCarthy named Wilson as a backup safety to begin the season, behind starting duo Xavier Woods and Darian Thompson.

On October 4, 2020, Wilson took over as the strong safety, replacing Darian Thompson, when he failed to defend a 37–yard trick pass from Jarvis Landry to fellow wide receiver Odell Beckham Jr. for a touchdown on the first drive of the game. Wilson collected a season-high ten combined tackles (six solo) and made his first career sack on Baker Mayfield during a 49–38 loss against the Cleveland Browns. After his Week 4 performance, head coach Mike McCarthy named Wilson the starting strong safety. In Week 11, Wilson recorded nine combined tackles (two solo), a season-high two forced fumbles, a fumble recovery, and was credited with half a sack during a 31-28 win at the Minnesota Vikings. The following week, he collected a season-high nine solo tackles (ten combined) during a 16–41 loss against the Washington Football Team in Week 12. He was inactive for the next two games (Weeks 13–14) after injuring his groin. On December 20, 2020, Wilson made eight combined tackles (six solo), a season-high two pass deflections, and made his first career interception on a pass attempt by Nick Mullens to tight end Jordan Reed during the 41–33 win against the San Francisco 49er. In Week 17, he recorded four combined tackles (one solo), one sack, and intercepted a pass thrown by Daniel Jones as the Cowboys lost 23–19 at the New York Giants. He finished with 71 combined tackles (48 solo), two interceptions, three passes defended, 3.5 sacks, a career-high three forced fumbles, and two fumble recoveries in 14 games and ten starts.

=== 2021 ===
On January 8, 2021, the Dallas Cowboys fired defensive coordinator Mike Nolan. Wilson entered training camp slated as the starting strong safety. New defensive coordinator Dan Quinn retained Wilson as the starting strong safety to start the season, alongside free safety Damontae Kazee.

Wilson injured his groin during training camp and missed four games (Weeks 2–5) after reaggravating his injury. In Week 9, he collected a season-high six combined tackles (four solo) during a 16–30 loss to the Denver Broncos. On November 24, 2021, the Dallas Cowboys officially placed Wilson on injured reserve with shoulder and chest injuries. On December 25, 2021, the Wilson was activated from injured reserve after missing four consecutive games (Weeks 12–15). He finished the 2021 NFL season with 29 combined tackles (17 solo) and one pass deflection in nine games and three starts.

The Dallas Cowboys finished the 2021 NFL season first in the NFC East with a 12–5 record, clinching a playoff berth in their first season under Mike McCarthy. On January 16, 2023, Wilson started in his first career playoff appearance and made six combined tackles (four solo) as the Cowboys lost 17–23 against the San Francisco 49ers, subsequently eliminating the from the playoffs.

=== 2022 ===
He began training camp projected to be a backup safety after the emergence of Jayron Kearse during his absence. He competed against Malik Hooker to be a starting safety. Head coach Mike McCarthy named Wilson and Jayron Kearse the starting safeties to begin the season.

On September 11, 2022, Wilson started in the Dallas Cowboys' home-opener against the Tampa Bay Buccaneers and made five combined tackles (four solo), broke up a pass, and made his lone interception of the season on a pass attempt by Tom Brady to wide receiver Mike Evans during a 19–3 loss. In Week 3, he collected a season-high 11 combined tackles (nine solo), deflected a pass, and had a sack during a 23–16 victory at the New York Giants. On December 4, 2022, Wilson tied his season-high with 11 combined tackles (nine solo) and recorded one sack as the Cowboys routed the Indianapolis Colts 54–19. He started all 17 regular season games for the first time in his career and led the team with a total of 101 combined tackles (72 solo), five sacks, one interception, two pass breakups, forced two fumbles and recovered one fumble, and four tackles for loss.

=== 2023 ===
On March 14, 2023, the Dallas Cowboys signed Wilson to a three–year, $21.00 million contract extension that includes $13.50 million guaranteed upon signing and an initial signing bonus of $6.60 million. Head coach Mike McCarthy retained Wilson as the starting strong safety to kick off the season, alongside free safety Malik Hooker. The trio of Wilson, Hooker, and Kearse earned the monicker the "three-headed monster" from Dallas Cowboys' fans. PFF had Wilson ranked as the 26th best safety heading into the 2023.

He was sidelined for the first two games (Weeks 1–2) of the regular season due to a calf injury. In Week 16, he collected a season-high 12 combined tackles (eight solo) during a 22–20 loss at the Miami Dolphins. The following week, Wilson made 11 combined tackles (six solo), one pass deflection, and had his first interception of the season on a pass attempt thrown by Jared Goff to tight end Sam LaPorta as the Cowboys routed the Detroit Lions 20–19. He finished the 2023 NFL season with 88 combined tackles (55 solo), three pass deflections, two interceptions, two fumble recoveries, and one forced fumble in 15 games and 13 starts. Wilson earned an overall grade of 68.0 from Pro Football Focus, which ranked 48th amongst his position group. His coverage grade of 69.8 from PFF ranked 37th.

=== 2024 ===
The Dallas Cowboys hired Mike Zimmer as their new defensive coordinator, replacing Quinn who accepted the head coaching role with the Washington Commanders. Wilson and Malik Hooker returned as the starting safety duo to begin the season.

On September 15, 2024, Wilson made six combined tackles (four solo), a pass deflection, and had his only pick of the season on a pass by Derek Carr as the Cowboys were routed 19–44 by the New Orleans Saints. In Week 14, he collected a season-high nine combined tackles (five solo) and was credited with half a sack during a 20–27 loss against the Cincinnati Bengals. He finished the 2024 NFL season with a total of 82 combined tackles (44 solo), five pass deflections, 4.5 sacks, two forced fumbles, a fumble recovery, and one interception while starting all 17 games. He received an overall grade of 62.2 from Pro Football Focus, which ranked 97th among 170 qualifying safeties in 2024.

=== 2025 ===
The Dallas Cowboys hired Matt Eberflus as their new defensive coordinator, replacing Zimmer. Wilson anchored the backend of a struggling secondary that gave up the most points in the NFL, languishing himself in deep coverage and allowing a high passer rating to opposing quarterbacks. His best game came in Week 2 against the New York Giants, recording six tackles and also intercepted a pass with two minutes remaining in overtime, setting up a game-winning drive as the Cowboys went on to win 40-37. Wilson led the defense with 921 total snaps, posting 15 starts, 79 tackles (third on the team), 3 tackles for loss, 5 passes defended, 2 interceptions, 4 quarterback pressures and one forced fumble. He was not re-signed after the season.

== NFL career statistics ==
Legend
**Bold**	Career high

=== Regular season ===
Year	Team	Games		Tackles					Fumbles				Interceptions				
Year	Team	GP	GS	Cmb	Solo	Ast	Sck	TFL	FF	FR	Yds	TD	Int	Yds	Lng	TD	PD
2019	DAL	11	0	2	1	1	0.0	0	0	0	0	0	0	0	0	0	0
2020	DAL	14	10	71	48	23	3.5	2	**3**	**2**	0	0	**2**	5	5	0	3
2021	DAL	9	3	29	17	12	0.0	0	0	0	0	0	0	0	0	0	1
2022	DAL	**17**	**17**	**101**	**77**	**24**	**5.0**	**7**	2	1	0	0	1	0	0	0	2
2023	DAL	15	13	88	55	33	0.0	2	1	**2**	0	0	**2**	0	0	0	3
2024	DAL	**17**	**17**	82	44	38	4.5	6	2	1	0	0	1	0	0	0	**5**
2025	DAL	15	15	71	39	32	0.0	3	1	0	0	0	**2**	**21**	**21**	0	**5**
Career		98	75	444	281	163	13.0	20	9	6	0	0	8	26	21	0	19

=== Postseason ===
Year	Team	Games		Tackles					Fumbles				Interceptions				
Year	Team	GP	GS	Cmb	Solo	Ast	Sck	TFL	FF	FR	Yds	TD	Int	Yds	Lng	TD	PD
2021	DAL	1	1	6	2	4	0.0	0	0	0	0	0	0	0	0	0	0
2022	DAL	**2**	**2**	**14**	**9**	**5**	0.0	0	0	0	0	0	0	0	0	0	**2**
2023	DAL	1	1	5	2	3	0.0	0	0	0	0	0	0	0	0	0	0
Career		4	4	25	13	12	0.0	0	0	0	0	0	0	0	0	0	2
