= Xavier Woods (American football) =

American football player (born 1995)

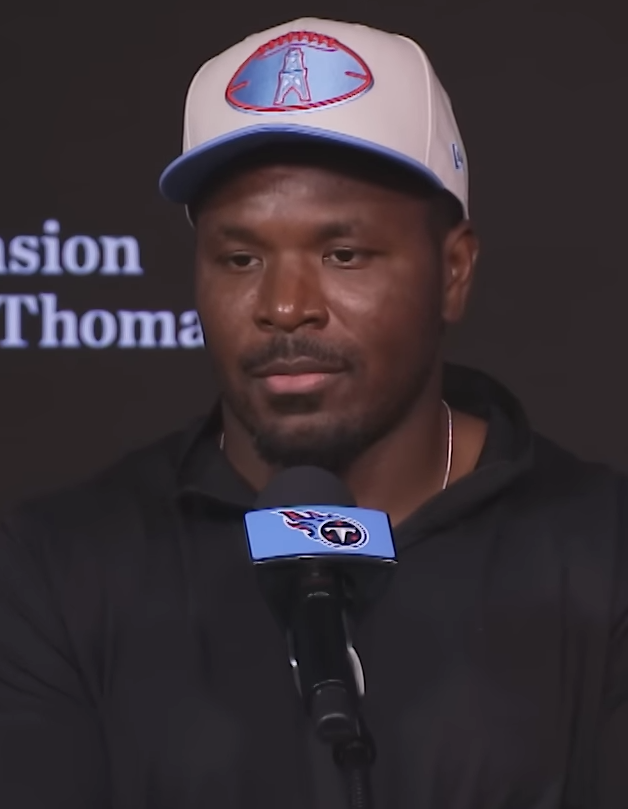
- Woods with the Tennessee Titans in 2025

Profile
- Position: Safety

Personal information
- Born: July 26, 1995 (age 31); Monroe, Louisiana, U.S.
- Listed height: 5 ft 11 in (1.80 m)
- Listed weight: 202 lb (92 kg)

Career information
- High school: West Monroe (West Monroe, Louisiana)
- College: Louisiana Tech (2013–2016)
- NFL draft: 2017: 6th round, 191st overall pick

Career history
- Dallas Cowboys (2017–2020); Minnesota Vikings (2021); Carolina Panthers (2022–2024); Tennessee Titans (2025); Chicago Bears (2026)

Awards and highlights
- 3× First-team All-Conference USA (2014, 2015, 2016)

Career NFL statistics as of 2025
- Total tackles: 660
- Sacks: 2
- Forced fumbles: 5
- Fumble recoveries: 5
- Pass deflections: 50
- Interceptions: 15
- Stats at Pro Football Reference

Xavier Woods (born July 26, 1995) is an American professional football safety. He was selected by the Dallas Cowboys in the sixth round of the 2017 NFL draft. He played college football for the Louisiana Tech Bulldogs.

== Early life ==
Woods attended West Monroe High School. As a freshman, he played at wide receiver. As a sophomore, he moved to defensive back and intercepted 6 passes, including 2 returned for touchdowns.

As a junior, he helped his team win the 2011 football state championship, while posting 43 tackles, 5 interceptions, 6 receptions for 233 yards and 2 punt returns for 60 yards.

As a senior, he received All-state, All-Northeast Louisiana and All-district honors. He also played basketball.

== College career ==
Woods accepted a football scholarship from Louisiana Tech University. He started 10 games out of 12 as a true freshman at free safety, tallying 61 tackles (3 for loss) and 2 passes defensed.

As a sophomore, he posted 71 tackles (3.5 for loss), 7 passes defensed and 3 forced fumbles. He also had 6 interceptions, including one returned for a touchdown in a win over the University of Illinois in the 2014 Heart of Dallas Bowl.

As a junior he took a step back, recording 56 tackles (7.5 for loss), 3 interceptions and 3 passes defensed.

As a senior, he registered 89 tackles (6.5 for loss), 5 interceptions and 6 passes defensed. He graduated after starting all but two career games, collecting 181 tackles (20.5 for loss), 14 interceptions (third in school history), 18 passes defensed, 4 sacks, 6 forced fumbles, and 325 interception return yards (first in school history).

=== Statistics ===
Louisiana Tech Bulldogs
Season	Tackles						Interceptions				
Season	Cmb	Solo	Ast	TfL	Sck	FF	Int	Yds	Avg	TD	PD
2013	61	32	29	3.0	0.0	0	0	0	0.0	0	2
2014	71	52	19	3.5	1.0	3	6	230	38.3	2	7
2015	56	37	19	7.5	0.0	2	3	69	23.0	0	3
2016	84	60	24	6.5	3.0	1	5	45	9.0	0	6
Total	272	181	91	20.5	4.0	6	14	344	24.6	2	18

== Professional career ==
=== Pre-draft ===
He was one of 60 defensive backs invited to the NFL Scouting Combine in Indianapolis, Indiana. He performed all of the combine positional drills, finishing seventh among safeties in the 40-yard dash. On March 23, 2017, he participated at Louisiana Tech's pro day, along with Carlos Henderson, Trent Taylor, and 12 other prospects. Woods beat his times at the combine in the 40-yard dash (4.51), 20-yard dash (2.59), and 10-yard dash (1.58) while also performing positional drills for scouts and team representatives from all 32 NFL teams. He had two pre-draft visits that included the Dallas Cowboys and Tampa Bay Buccaneers. At the conclusion of the pre-draft process, NFL draft analysts projected him to be selected anywhere from the fourth to sixth rounds. He was ranked as the seventh best strong safety in the draft by DraftScout.com.

External videos
- Louisiana Tech Xavier Woods highlights
- NFL Draft Profile: Xavier Woods

Pre-draft measurables
Height	Weight	Arm length	Hand span	Wingspan	40-yard dash	10-yard split	20-yard split	20-yard shuttle	Three-cone drill	Vertical jump	Broad jump	Bench press
5 ft 11 1/8 in (1.81 m)	197 lb (89 kg)	30 3/8 in (0.77 m)	9 3/8 in (0.24 m)	6 ft 1 7/8 in (1.88 m)	4.51 s	1.58 s	2.59 s	4.13 s	6.72 s	33.5 in (0.85 m)	10 ft 2 in (3.10 m)	19 reps
All values from NFL Combine/Pro Day

=== Dallas Cowboys ===
The Dallas Cowboys selected Woods in the sixth round (191st overall) of the 2017 NFL draft. The Dallas Cowboys traded a 2018 fifth round pick (157th overall) to the New York Jets in order to acquire the 2017 sixth round pick (191st overall) in return used to draft Woods. He was the 19th safety drafted in 2017.

"He was by far the highest rated player on our board. We decided to pull the trigger on that, and of course it certainly was a position of need if you look at it in terms of the safeties we lost in free agency, it was sure nice to get a guy like Woods.”

— Stephen Jones (Cowboys' Executive VP)

==== 2017 ====
On May 11, 2017, the Dallas Cowboys signed Woods to a four–year, $2.55 million rookie contract that includes an initial signing bonus of $159,888.

Throughout training camp, Woods competed for a roster spot as a backup safety against Robert Blanton, Kavon Frazier, and Jameill Showers. Head coach Jason Garrett named him the backup free safety to Byron Jones to begin the regular season.

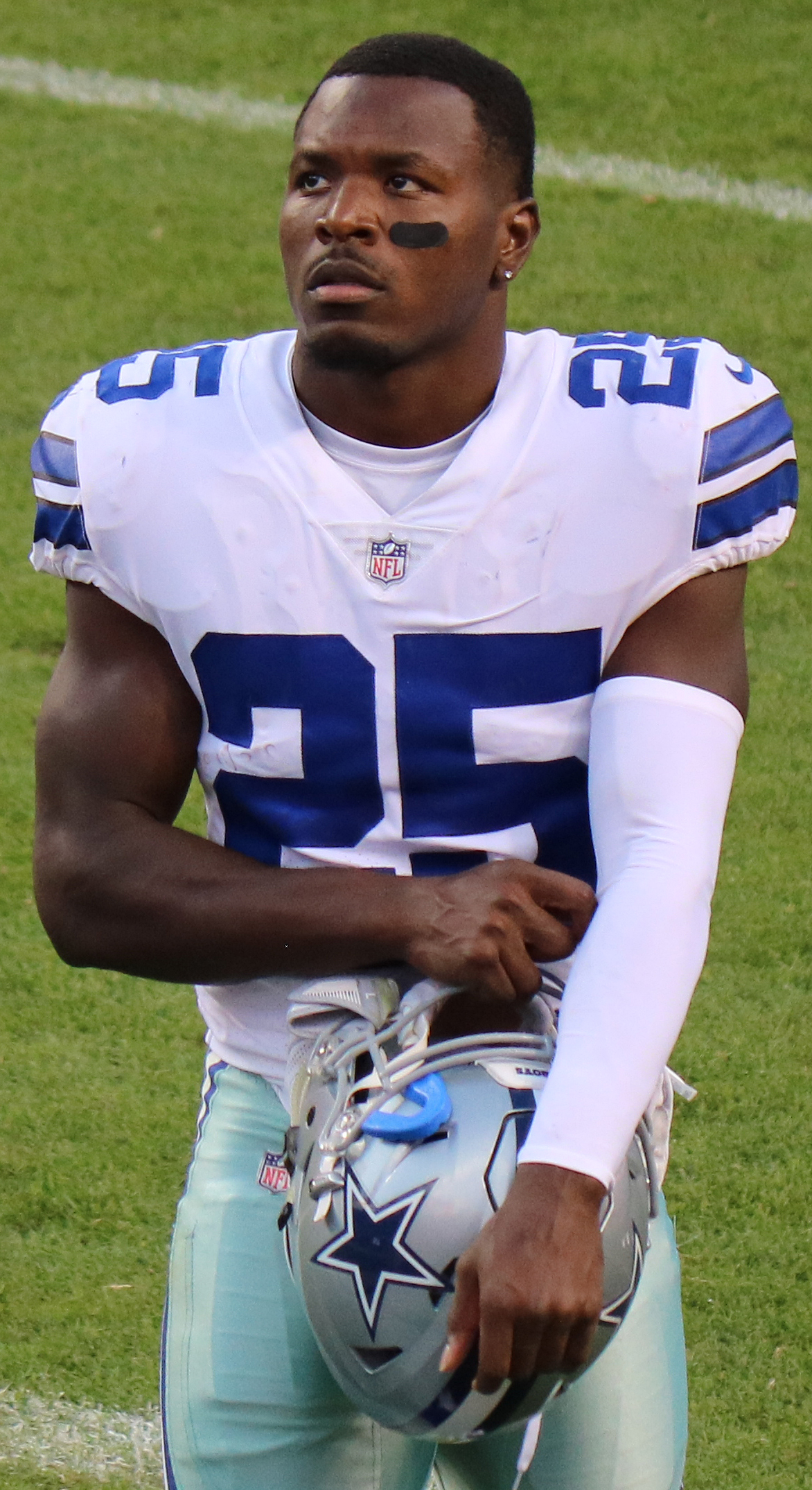
Woods with the Dallas Cowboys in 2017

On September 10, 2017, Woods made his professional regular season debut during the Dallas Cowboys' home-opener against the New York Giants, but saw limited snaps on special teams as they won 19–3. In Week 3, Woods earned his first snaps on defense and made three solo tackles and a pass deflection during a 28–17 victory at the Arizona Cardinals. He recorded his first career tackle on the opening kickoff on Cardinals' running back Kerwynn Williams after a 21-yard kick return. On November 12, 2017, Woods made four combined tackles (two solo), a pass deflection, and had his first career interception off a pass thrown by Atlanta Falcons quarterback Matt Ryan to wide receiver Mohamed Sanu during a 27–7 loss at the Atlanta Falcons. The following week, Woods earned his first career start at strong safety to replace Jeff Heath who was inactive due to a concussion he sustained the previous week and he recorded a season-high five combined tackles (four solo) during a 37–9 loss to the Philadelphia Eagles in Week 11. In Week 13, Woods earned the starting strong safety job and recorded three combined tackles (one solo) during a 38–14 win against the Washington Redskins. He finished his rookie season during the 2017 NFL season with a total of 42 combined tackles (33 solo), three pass deflections, a fumble recovery, and one interception in 16 games and four starts. Due to injuries to multiple teammates throughout the season, Woods was tasked with playing both safety and nickelback or slot cornerback. He received an overall grade of 78.8 from Pro Football Focus in 2017.

==== 2018 ====
Throughout organized team activities, he competed against Kavon Frazier, Jeff Heath, Marqueston Huff, and Jameill Showers to earn a job as a starting safety after defensive coordinator Rod Marinelli chose to transition Byron Jones from safety to cornerback and Woods was named the regular starter at free safety. Head coach Jason Garrett named Woods the starting free safety to begin the season and paired him with strong safety Jeff Heath.

On August 18, 2018, Woods exited in the third quarter of a 13–21 loss to the Cincinnati Bengals due to an injured hamstring. He remained inactive for the first two games (Weeks 1–2) of the season due to his hamstring injury. On October 7, 2018, he produced five combined tackles (four solo), broke up a pass, and intercepted a pass by Deshaun Watson to wide receiver DeAndre Hopkins with less than 20 seconds in the fourth quarter to send the 16–16 game into overtime at the Houston Texans. The Cowboys would go on to lose the Week 5 matchup at the Texans 19–16. In Week 11, he collected a season-high nine combined tackles (seven solo) during a 22–19 win at the Atlanta Falcons. On November 22, 2018, Woods made five combined tackles (four solo), tied his season-high of three pass deflections, and helped secure a 31–23 win on Thursday Night Football against the Washington Redskins on Thanksgiving with a late fourth quarter interception on a pass thrown by Colt McCoy and was intended for wide receiver Maurice Harris. He finished the season with a total of 56 combined tackles (39 solo), nine passes defensed, two interceptions, and one forced fumble in 14 games and 14 starts. Pro Football Focus had Woods finish 2018 with an overall grade of 68.0.

The Dallas Cowboys finished the 2018 NFL season with a 10–6 record to win the NFC East and clinch a playoff berth. On January 5, 2019, Woods started in the first playoff game of his career and made two solo tackles as the Cowboys defeated the Seattle Seahawks 24–22 in the NFC Wild-card Game. On January 12, 2019, he recorded eight combined tackles (five solo) during a 22–30 loss at the Los Angeles Rams in the Divisional Round.

==== 2019 ====
During training camp, he competed to be a starting safety against Kavon Frazier, Jeff Heath, George Iloka, Darian Thompson, and rookie Donovan Wilson. Head coach Jason Garrett named him the starting free safety to begin the season and paired him with Jeff Heath.

On September 8, 2019, Woods collected a season-high 11 combined tackles (nine solo) during a 35–17 win against the New York Giants in the Dallas Cowboys' home-opener in Week 1. The following week, he recorded six combined tackles (four solo) as the Cowboys won 31–21 at the Washington Redskins, but suffered a high ankle sprain. He was subsequently inactive during a 31–6 victory against the Miami Dolphins in Week 3 due to his ankle injury. On October 20, 2019, he had one solo tackle, one pass deflection, and made an interception off a pass attempt by Carson Wentz to wide receiver Alshon Jeffery as the Cowboys defeated the Philadelphia Eagles 37–10. The following week, Woods made four combined tackles (three solo), a pass deflection, and intercepted a pass by Daniel Jones to wide receiver Darius Slayton during a 37–18 win at the New York Giants in Week 9. His Week 9 performance earned him NFC Defensive Player of the Week honors. He finished the season with 77 combined tackles (52 solo), five pass deflections, two interceptions, two forced fumbles, a fumble recovery, and one tackle in 14 games and 14 starts. He received an overall grade of 73.0 from Pro Football Focus in 2019.

==== 2020 ====
On January 7, 2020, the Dallas Cowboys' owner Jerry Jones announced the hiring of former Green Bay Packers' head coach Mike McCarthy to the same position following the departure of head coach Jason Garrett and the decision not to re-new his contract. During training camp, he competed to be a starting safety against Darian Thompson, Ha Ha Clinton-Dix, and Donovan Wilson under defensive coordinator Mike Nolan. Head coach Mike McCarthy named Woods and Darian Thompson the starting safeties to begin the season.

On November 26, 2020, Woods collected a season-high ten combined tackles (six solo) and made one pass deflection as the Cowboys lost 16–41 to the Washington Football Team. He was inactive during a 37–17 victory against the Philadelphia Eagles in Week 16 due to a rib injury. He finished the 2020 NFL season with a total of 72 combined tackles (48 solo) and one pass deflection in 15 games and 15 starts. He received an overall grade of 61.9 from Pro Football Focus in 2020.

=== Minnesota Vikings ===
==== 2021 ====
On March 30, 2021, the Minnesota Vikings signed Woods to a one–year, $1.75 million contract that included $1.50 million guaranteed upon signing and a signing bonus of $500,000.

Throughout training camp, he competed to be the starting free safety against Josh Metellus and rookie Camryn Bynum. Head coach Mike Zimmer named him the starting free safety to begin the season and was paired with strong safety Harrison Smith.

On September 19, 2021, Woods recorded four combined tackles (three solo), made one pass deflection, and had his first interception as a member of the Vikings off a pass thrown by Kyler Murray to wide receiver Christian Kirk during a 33–34 loss at the Arizona Cardinals. In Week 4, he collected a season-high 11 combined tackles (four solo) as the Vikings lost 7–14 against the Cleveland Browns. On October 31, 2021, Woods made eight combined tackles (four solo), a pass deflection, one interception, and had his first career sack during the 16–22 loss against the Dallas Cowboys. He had his first career sack for a three-yard loss on former teammate Cooper Rush and also forced a fumble by Rush that was recovered by linebacker Anthony Barr for a turnover during the fourth quarter. In Week 16, he produced eight combined tackles (five solo), broke up a pass, and tied his career-high with his third interception of the season on a pass by Matthew Stafford to wide receiver Van Jefferson as the Vikings lost 30–23 to the Los Angeles Rams. He started all 17 games during the 2021 NFL season for the first time in his career and finished with a total of career-high 108 combined tackles (72 solo), a career-high ten pass deflections, three interceptions, one sack, and a forced fumble. Pro Football Focus had Woods earn an overall grade of 66.4 in 2021.

=== Carolina Panthers ===
==== 2022 ====
On March 16, 2022, the Carolina Panthers signed Woods to a three–year, $15.00 million contract that includes $6.03 million guaranteed upon signing and an initial signing bonus of $5.00 million.

During training camp, Woods competed to be a starting safety against Juston Burris, Sam Franklin Jr., Sean Chandler, Myles Hartsfield, and Kenny Robinson. Head coach Matt Rhule named him the starting strong safety to begin the season and paired him with Jeremy Chinn.

In Week 2, Woods collected a season-high 11 combined tackles (six solo) during a 16–19 loss at the New York Giants. He was inactive for the Panthers' 15–37 loss against the San Francisco 49ers in Week 5 due to an injured hamstring. On October 10, 2022, the Panthers announced their decision to fire head coach Matt Rhule after falling to a 1–4 record and appointed secondary coach Steve Wilks to interim head coach for the remainder of the season. He was also sidelined for a 30–24 victory at the Seattle Seahawks in Week 14 after sustaining an injury to his knee. On December 24, 2022, Woods made three solo tackles and set a season-high with two pass deflections as the Panthers defeated the Detroit Lions 37–23. He finished the 2022 NFL season with a total of 86 combined tackles (53 solo), six pass deflections, and two fumble recoveries in 15 games and 15 starts. He received an overall grade of 63.5 from Pro Football Focus in 2022, which ranked 58th out of 89 qualifying safeties.

==== 2023 ====
He entered training camp slated as the starting strong safety under new defensive coordinator Ejiro Evero. Head coach Frank Reich named Woods the starting strong safety to begin the season and paired him with Vonn Bell.

In Week 2, he collected a season-high eight combined tackles (four solo) and set a season-high with two pass deflections during a 17–20 loss against the New Orleans Saints. He was inactive for three consecutive games (Weeks 4–6) due to a hamstring injury. On October 29, 2023, he tied his season-high of eight combined tackles (six solo) and recovered a fumble during a 15–13 win against the Houston Texans. On November 27, 2023, the Panthers announced their decision to fire head coach Frank Reich after falling to a 1–10 record and subsequently appointed special teams coordinator Chris Tabor to interim head coach in his absence. On December 3, 2023, Woods recorded three combined tackles (one solo), broke up a pass, and had his first interception as part of the Panthers on a pass thrown by Baker Mayfield to wide receiver Mike Evans during an 18–21 loss at the Tampa Bay Buccaneers. He finished the 2023 NFL season with 61 combined tackles (39 solo), seven pass deflections, two interceptions, and a fumble recovery in 14 games and 14 starts. He received an overall grade of 80.3 from Pro Football Focus, setting a career-high while also ranking 12th amongst 90 qualifying safeties.

==== 2024 ====
He entered training camp as the de facto starting strong safety under defensive coordinator Ejiro Evero. Head coach Dave Canales named Woods the starting strong safety to begin the season and paired him with Jordan Fuller.

On September 29, 2024, Woods made ten combined tackles (seven solo), a pass deflection, and intercepted a pass by Joe Burrow to wide receiver Ja'Marr Chase during a 24–34 loss against the Cincinnati Bengals. In Week 13, he recorded seven combined tackles (five solo), broke up a pass, and tied his career-high with his third interception of the season on a pass thrown by Baker Mayfield to wide receiver Jalen McMillan as the Panthers lost 23–26 in overtime against the Tampa Bay Buccaneers. He started all 17 games during the 2024 NFL season and had a career-high 119 combined tackles (72 solo), six pass deflections, and a career-high tying three interceptions. He received an overall grade of 57.0 from Pro Football Focus, which ranked 125th among 170 qualifying safeties.

=== Tennessee Titans ===
==== 2025 ====
On March 14, 2025, the Tennessee Titans signed Woods to a two–year, $8.00 million contract that includes $3.49 million guaranteed and an initial signing bonus of $2.00 million. He played in 11 games with 10 starts, recording 39 tackles, one sack, three pass deflections, and two interceptions. On December 16, Woods was placed on injured reserve due to a hamstring injury suffered in Week 15 against the San Francisco 49ers. On February 25, 2026, Woods was released by the Titans.

=== Chicago Bears ===
On August 7, 2026, Woods signed with the Chicago Bears. He was released on October 17.

== NFL career statistics ==
Legend
**Bold**	Career high

=== Regular season ===
Year	Team	Games		Tackles					Interceptions						Fumbles				
Year	Team	GP	GS	Cmb	Solo	Ast	Sck	TFL	Int	Yds	Avg	Lng	TD	PD	FF	Fmb	FR	Yds	TD
2017	DAL	16	4	42	33	9	0.0	1	1	7	7.0	7	0	3	0	0	1	6	0
2018	DAL	14	14	56	39	17	0.0	0	2	15	7.5	15	0	9	1	0	0	0	0
2019	DAL	15	15	77	52	25	0.0	1	2	38	19.0	29	0	5	**2**	0	1	0	0
2020	DAL	15	15	72	48	24	0.0	2	0	0	0.0	0	0	1	0	0	0	0	0
2021	MIN	17	17	108	**72**	36	**1.0**	1	**3**	54	18.0	27	0	**10**	**2**	0	0	0	0
2022	CAR	15	15	86	53	33	0.0	0	0	0	0.0	0	0	6	0	0	**2**	**30**	0
2023	CAR	14	14	61	39	22	0.0	**4**	2	-1	-0.5	2	0	7	0	0	1	5	0
2024	CAR	17	17	**119**	**72**	**47**	0.0	2	**3**	**70**	23.3	33	0	6	0	0	0	0	0
2025	TEN	11	10	39	23	16	**1.0**	0	2	51	**25.5**	**35**	0	3	0	0	0	0	0
Career		134	121	660	431	229	2.0	11	15	234	15.6	35	0	50	5	0	5	41	0

=== Postseason ===
Year	Team	Games		Tackles					Interceptions						Fumbles				
Year	Team	GP	GS	Cmb	Solo	Ast	Sck	TFL	Int	Yds	Avg	Lng	TD	PD	FF	Fmb	FR	Yds	TD
2018	DAL	2	2	10	7	3	0.0	0	0	0	0.0	0	0	0	0	0	0	0	0
Career		2	2	10	7	3	0.0	0	0	0	0.0	0	0	0	0	0	0	0	0
