= Darian Thompson =

American football player (born 1993)

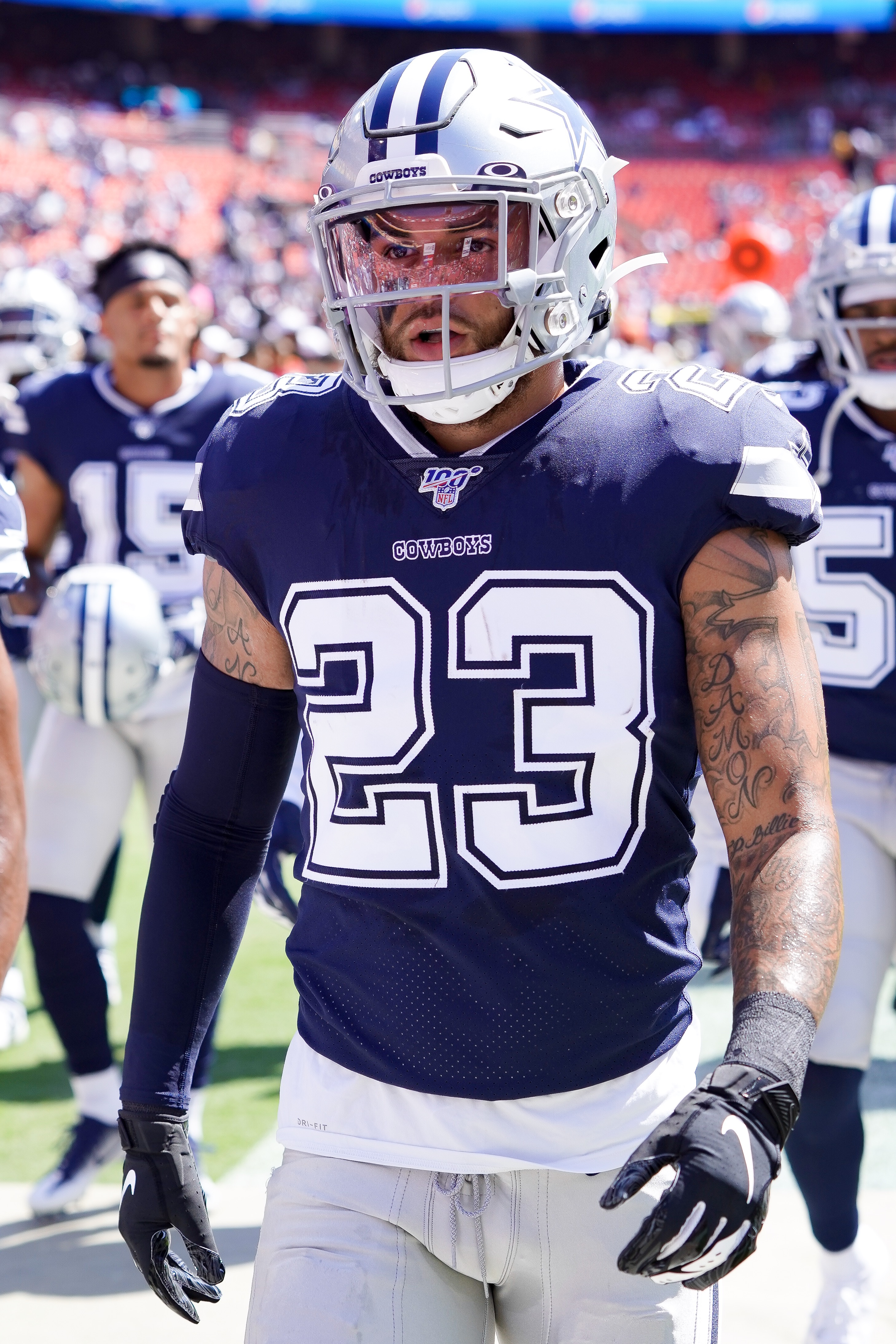
- Thompson with the Dallas Cowboys in 2019

Pittsburgh Steelers
- Title: Special teams quality control coach

Personal information
- Born: September 22, 1993 (age 33); Lancaster, California, U.S.
- Listed height: 6 ft 2 in (1.88 m)
- Listed weight: 212 lb (96 kg)

Career information
- Position: Safety (No. 27, 20, 23)
- High school: Paraclete (Lancaster)
- College: Boise State (2011–2015)
- NFL draft: 2016: 3rd round, 71st overall pick

Career history

Playing
- New York Giants (2016–2017); Arizona Cardinals (2018)*; Dallas Cowboys (2018–2021)
- * Offseason or practice squad member only

Coaching
- Dallas Cowboys (2023–2024) Assistant linebackers coach & quality control coach; Dallas Cowboys (2025) Secondary/nickels coach; Pittsburgh Steelers (2026–present) Special teams quality control coach

Awards and highlights
- Third-team All-American (2015); 2× First-team All-MW (2014, 2015)

Career NFL statistics
- Total tackles: 170
- Sacks: 1.5
- Forced fumbles: 1
- Fumble recoveries: 1
- Pass deflections: 10
- Interceptions: 2
- Stats at Pro Football Reference

Darian Thompson (born September 22, 1993) is an American professional football coach and former player. He currently serves as the special teams quality control coach for the Pittsburgh Steelers of the National Football League (NFL). He played in the NFL as a safety. Thompson played college football for the Boise State Broncos, and was selected by the New York Giants in third round of the 2016 NFL draft.

== Early life ==
Thompson attended Paraclete High School in Lancaster, California. He played defensive back and wide receiver. For his career he had 152 tackles and 12 interceptions.

As a senior, he set school records with 52 receptions for 953 yards and 13 touchdowns. Thompson was rated as a three-star recruit and committed to Boise State University to play college football.

== College career ==
After redshirting his first year at Boise State in 2011, Thompson appeared in all 13 games, with six starts, as a redshirt freshman in 2012. For the season he had 43 tackles and three interceptions.

As a sophomore in 2013, he started all 13 games and recorded 63 tackles and four interceptions.

Thompson again started all 13 games as a junior in 2014. He recorded 71 tackles and seven interceptions and was named a second-team All-American by CBSSports.com.

As a senior in 2015, Thompson tied Eric Weddle's Mountain West Conference record for career interceptions. Later in the same season, in a game against UNLV, Thompson recorded his 19th interception of his career breaking the mark set by Weddle.

== Professional career ==
=== Pre-draft ===
Thompson attended the NFL Scouting Combine and completed all of the combine and positional drills. On March 31, 2016, Thompson participated at Boise State's pro day and attempted to improve his performance in the 40-yard dash (4.58s), 20-yard dash (2.67s), and 10-yard dash (1.59s).

At the conclusion of the pre-draft process, Thompson was projected to be a second to fourth round pick by NFL draft experts and scouts. He was ranked as the third best free safety in the draft by DraftScout.com and was ranked the fifth best defensive back by Sports Illustrated.

Pre-draft measurables
| Height | Weight | Arm length | Hand span | 40-yard dash | 10-yard split | 20-yard split | 20-yard shuttle | Three-cone drill | Vertical jump | Broad jump | Bench press | Wonderlic |
|---|---|---|---|---|---|---|---|---|---|---|---|---|
| 6 ft 1 7/8 in (1.88 m) | 208 lb (94 kg) | 30 3/8 in (0.77 m) | 9 1/8 in (0.23 m) | 4.69 s | 1.66 s | 2.74 s | 4.33 s | 7.26 s | 32.5 in (0.83 m) | 9 ft 10 in (3.00 m) | 12 reps | 29 |
All values from NFL Combine

=== New York Giants ===
==== 2016 season ====
The New York Giants selected Thompson in the third round (71st overall) of the 2016 NFL draft. Thompson was the sixth safety drafted in 2016.

On June 2, 2016, the Giants signed Thompson to a four-year, $3.45 million contract that includes a signing bonus of $837,136.

He entered training camp competing with Nat Berhe and Mykkele Thompson for the vacant starting free safety position. Head coach Ben McAdoo named Thompson the backup free safety to begin the regular season, behind Nat Berhe.

He made his professional regular season debut in the Giants' season-opener at the Dallas Cowboys and made three combined tackles in their 20–19 victory. On September 18, 2016, Thompson earned his first career start after he surpassed Nat Berhe on the depth chart and was named the starting free safety. He made a season-high four solo tackles before exiting in the fourth quarter of the Giants' 16–13 win against the New Orleans Saints due to a foot injury. Defensive coordinator Steve Spagnuolo was impressed with Thompson's mastery of defensive schemes and his ability to get his teammates lined up correctly.

On November 9, 2016, the Giants placed Thompson on injured reserve after he missed six games (Weeks 3–9) due to his foot injury that required surgery. Thompson finished his rookie season in 2016 with seven combined tackles (six solo) in two games and one start.

==== 2017 season ====
Thompson entered training camp slated as the starting free safety. McAdoo officially named Thompson the starting free safety to start the 2017 regular season, alongside strong safety Landon Collins. He started in the Giants' season-opener at the Cowboys and recorded three combined tackles during their 19–3 loss.

On October 8, 2017, Thompson collected a season-high 11 combined tackles (eight solo), two pass deflections, and made his first career interception during a 27–22 loss to the Los Angeles Chargers in Week 5. Thompson made the interception off a pass by Chargers' quarterback Philip Rivers, that was originally intended for wide receiver Keenan Allen, in the third quarter.

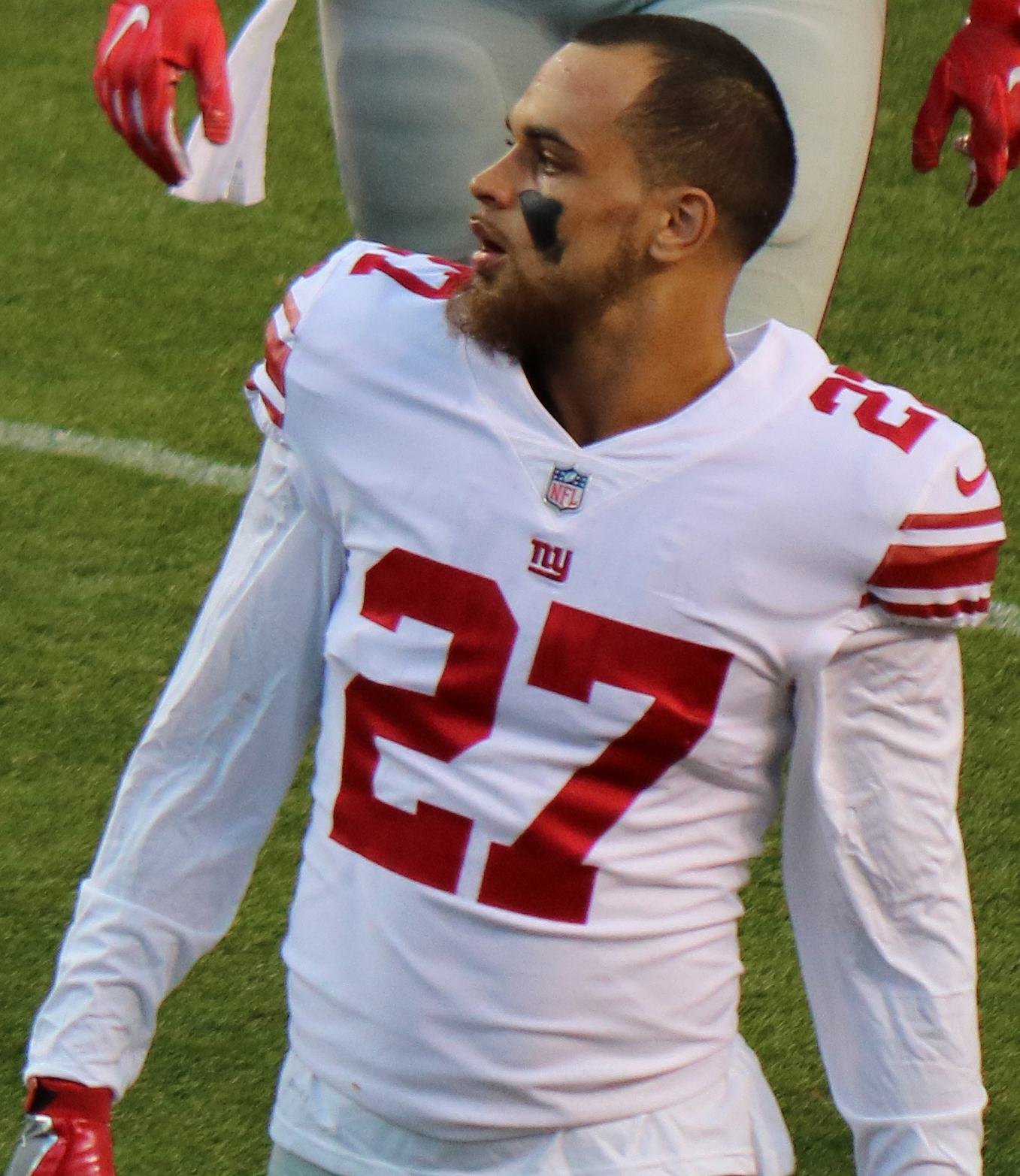
Thompson with the New York Giants in 2017

On December 4, 2017, the Giants fired head coach Ben McAdoo after they began the season with a 2–10 record. Defensive coordinator Steve Spagnuolo was named the interim head coach for the remainder of the season.

Thompson started in all 16 games in 2017 and recorded 75 combined tackles (61 solo), six pass deflections, and an interception. Pro Football Focus gave Thompson an overall grade of 52.2, which ranked 70th among all qualified safeties in 2017.

==== 2018 season ====
On September 1, 2018, Thompson was waived/injured by the Giants as part of final roster cuts after losing the starting safety job to Curtis Riley.

=== Arizona Cardinals ===
On October 2, 2018, Thompson was signed to the Arizona Cardinals' practice squad.

=== Dallas Cowboys ===
==== 2018 season ====
On October 9, 2018, Thompson was signed by the Dallas Cowboys off the Cardinals practice squad. He was waived on November 17, 2018, but re-signed three days later. He appeared in 10 games, playing primarily on special teams and did not record any tackles.

==== 2019 season ====
On March 7, 2019, Thompson was re-signed to a one-year contract as an unrestricted free agent. In week 3 against the Miami Dolphins, he started at free safety in place of an injured Xavier Woods and had 3 tackles. In week 11, he started at strong safety in place of an injured Jeff Heath.

In week 13 and 14, he again replaced an injured Heath. Against the Chicago Bears on Thursday Night Football, Thompson recorded a team high 9 tackles, one tackle for loss, 2 special teams tackles and sacked quarterback Mitch Trubisky once in the 31–24 loss. He appeared in 15 games with 4 starts, while registering 39 tackles (2 for loss), 1.5 sacks, 3 quarterback pressures, one fumble recovery and 9 special teams tackles (second on the team).

==== 2020 season ====
On March 17, 2020, Thompson signed a two-year contract extension with the Cowboys. With the departure of Jeff Heath, he passed free agent acquisition Ha Ha Clinton-Dix on the depth chart during training camp, and was named the starter at strong safety. In week 4, Thompson was replaced after the first drive of the Cleveland Browns, because he failed to defend a 37-yard touchdown trick pass from Jarvis Landry to fellow wide receiver Odell Beckham Jr., opening the door for second-year player Donovan Wilson to take over the full time starting position.

Thompson would return as the starter at strong safety in place of an injured Wilson in Week 13 against the Baltimore Ravens on Tuesday Night Football, recording his first interception as a Cowboy off a pass thrown by Lamar Jackson during the 34–17 loss. He would return to a backup role in the week 15 game against the San Francisco 49ers.

In week 16 against the Philadelphia Eagles, he started at free safety in place of an injured Xavier Woods. Thompson was placed on the reserve/COVID-19 list by the team on January 1, 2021, and activated on February 1, 2021. He finished the season with 43 tackles, one interception and one forced fumble.

==== 2021 season ====
On August 31, 2021, Thompson was waived by the Cowboys and re-signed to the practice squad the next day.

Thompson was elevated to the active roster on multiple times as a COVID-19 replacement. He appeared in five games, collecting two defensive tackles and one special teams tackle. He wasn't re-signed after the season.

== Coaching career ==
=== Dallas Cowboys ===
On February 19, 2023, the Dallas Cowboys hired Thompson as their assistant linebackers and defensive quality control coach. He was promoted to secondary/nickels coach for the 2025 season. He was not retained after the 2025 season, as new defensive coordinator Christian Parker completely revamped the defensive coaching staff.

=== Pittsburgh Steelers ===
On June 26, 2026, the Pittsburgh Steelers hired Thompson to serve as their special teams quality control coach.
