= Ha Ha Clinton-Dix =

American football player (born 1992)

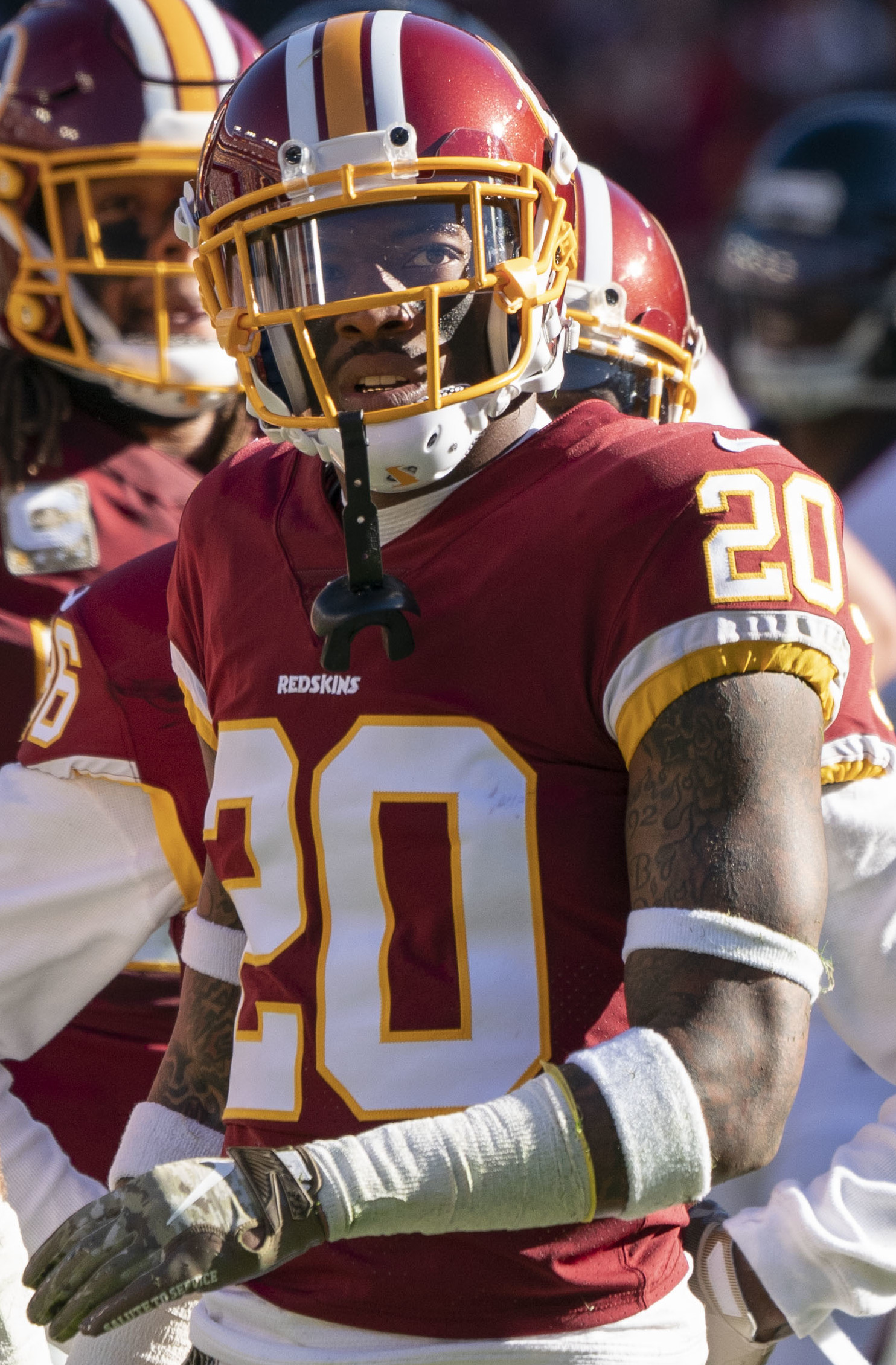
- Clinton-Dix with the Washington Redskins in 2018

Alabama Crimson Tide
- Title: Director of player development

Personal information
- Born: December 21, 1992 (age 33); Orlando, Florida, U.S.
- Listed height: 6 ft 1 in (1.85 m)
- Listed weight: 208 lb (94 kg)

Career information
- Position: Safety (No. 21, 20, 26, 49)
- High school: Dr. Phillips (Orlando)
- College: Alabama (2011–2013)
- NFL draft: 2014: 1st round, 21st overall pick

Career history

Playing
- Green Bay Packers (2014–2018); Washington Redskins (2018); Chicago Bears (2019); Dallas Cowboys (2020)*; San Francisco 49ers (2021)*; Las Vegas Raiders (2021); Denver Broncos (2021)*
- * Offseason or practice squad member only

Operations
- Alabama (2023–present) Director of player development

Awards and highlights
- Second-team All-Pro (2016); Pro Bowl (2016); PFWA All-Rookie Team (2014); 2× BCS national champion (2011, 2012); Consensus All-American (2013); First-team All-SEC (2013)

Career NFL statistics
- Total tackles: 522
- Sacks: 5.5
- Forced fumbles: 4
- Fumble recoveries: 5
- Interceptions: 16
- Defensive touchdowns: 1
- Stats at Pro Football Reference

Ha'Sean Treshon "Ha Ha" Clinton-Dix (born December 21, 1992) is an American former professional football player who was a safety for seven seasons in the National Football League (NFL), primarily with the Green Bay Packers. He played college football for the Alabama Crimson Tide and was selected by the Packers in the first round of the 2014 NFL draft. He later played for the Washington Redskins, Chicago Bears, and Las Vegas Raiders. He is currently the director of player development for the Alabama Crimson Tide.

== Early life ==
A native of Eatonville, Florida, Clinton-Dix was nicknamed "HaHa" as an infant by his grandmother in response to "Ha'Sean" often being pronounced /hɒˈʃɑːn/ (like "Shaun") instead of the intended /hɒˈsiːn/ (like "seen"). He prefers to go by "HaHa" and has stated that both he and his coaches love the moniker. In an interview, he explained that the true nickname is actually "HaHa" (in Pascal case, no space, two capitals).

Clinton-Dix spent his freshman and sophomore years at Edgewater High School, where he played running back and was a teammate of Mike Brewster. Before his junior year, Clinton-Dix transferred to Dr. Phillips High School, where he played alongside Dee Hart. In addition to football, he lettered in basketball and track, participating in the 4 × 100 m and 4 × 400 m relay at Edgewater. In football, he was an All-American defensive back and kick returner at Dr. Phillips. Named a five-star recruit by Rivals.com, Clinton-Dix was ranked the No. 1 safety in his class and sixth-rated player overall. During his senior football season, Clinton-Dix, teamed with All-American running back Hart, led Dr. Phillips to a 14–1 season. The Panthers lost to future NFL running back Devonta Freeman and Miami Central in the Florida 6A State Championship Game, ending the season ranked #21 nationally by Rivals.com.

College recruiting
| Name | Hometown | School | Height | Weight | 40^{‡} | Commit date |
|---|---|---|---|---|---|---|
| Ha Ha Clinton-Dix; Safety | Orlando, Florida | Dr. Phillips High School | 6 ft 2 in (1.88 m) | 190 lb (86 kg) | 4.50 | Apr 17, 2010 |
| Ha Ha Clinton-Dix; Safety | Recruit ratings: Scout: Rivals: 247Sports: ESPN: | | | | | |
Overall recruit ranking: Scout: 1 (S) Rivals: 1 (S) 247Sports: 2 (S) ESPN: 2 (S)
Note: In many cases, Scout, Rivals, 247Sports, On3, and ESPN may conflict in their listings of height and weight.; In these cases, the average was taken. ESPN grades are on a 100-point scale.; Sources:

== College career ==
Clinton-Dix was one of seven true freshmen that had playing time in 2011 for the Alabama Crimson Tide football team. Alabama won the 2011 national championship as it shut out LSU 21–0. In 2012, he tied for the SEC lead with five interceptions, and made seven tackles against Notre Dame in the 2012 championship game, one tackle less than C. J. Mosley. Alabama again won the BCS National Championship by blowing out Notre Dame by a score of 42–14.

On October 3, 2013, Clinton-Dix was suspended indefinitely for unspecified team rules violations, being reinstated after two games. He was a consensus selection for the 2013 All-America Team.

On December 2, 2013, he underwent arthroscopic surgery to repair a torn meniscus in his knee. He finished his junior year with 51 tackles and 2 interceptions. As a junior in 2013, Clinton-Dix was a first-team All-Southeastern Conference (SEC) selection. He was named among the top 5 safeties by NFL Media analyst Charles Davis.

After the season, he decided to forgo his senior year and enter the 2014 NFL draft. Clinton-Dix returned to school in 2017 to complete his degree, interning at the Green Bay Police Department. He graduated in 2018 with a bachelor's degree in criminal justice.

== Professional career ==
=== Pre-draft ===
On January 9, 2014, it was announced that Clinton-Dix had officially decided to forgo his remaining eligibility and enter the 2014 NFL draft. Clinton-Dix attended the NFL Scouting Combine in Indianapolis and completed all of the combine and positional drills. On March 12, 2014, he participated at Alabama's pro day, but opted to stand on his combine numbers and only performed positional drills. He also attended pre-draft visits with multiple teams, including the Baltimore Ravens, Detroit Lions, Philadelphia Eagles, and Tennessee Titans.

External videos
- Clinton-Dix's NFL Combine workout
- Clinton-Dix runs the 40-yard dash

At the conclusion of the pre-draft process, Clinton-Dix was projected to be a first or second round pick by NFL draft experts and scouts. He was ranked as the top safety prospect in the draft by NFL analyst Mike Mayock, was ranked as the top free safety by DraftScout.com, and was ranked the second best safety by Sports Illustrated.

Pre-draft measurables
| Height | Weight | Arm length | Hand span | Wingspan | 40-yard dash | 10-yard split | 20-yard split | 20-yard shuttle | Three-cone drill | Vertical jump | Broad jump | Bench press | Wonderlic |
|---|---|---|---|---|---|---|---|---|---|---|---|---|---|
| 6 ft 1 3/8 in (1.86 m) | 208 lb (94 kg) | 32 3/8 in (0.82 m) | 9 in (0.23 m) | 6 ft 6 1/2 in (1.99 m) | 4.58 s | 1.60 s | 2.68 s | 4.16 s | 7.16 s | 33 in (0.84 m) | 9 ft 11 in (3.02 m) | 11 reps | 15 |
All values from NFL Combine

=== Green Bay Packers ===
==== 2014 ====
The Green Bay Packers selected Clinton-Dix in the first round (21st overall) of the 2014 NFL draft. Clinton-Dix was the second safety drafted in 2014, behind Louisville safety Calvin Pryor (18th overall). On May 29, 2014, the Packers signed Clinton-Dix to a four-year, $8.33 million contract that includes $7.55 million guaranteed and a signing bonus of $4.38 million. He was issued No. 21 by the Green Bay Packers, which was last worn by Charles Woodson.

External videos
- Packers draft Ha Ha Clinton-Dix 21st overall
- Clinton-Dix received call from Packers

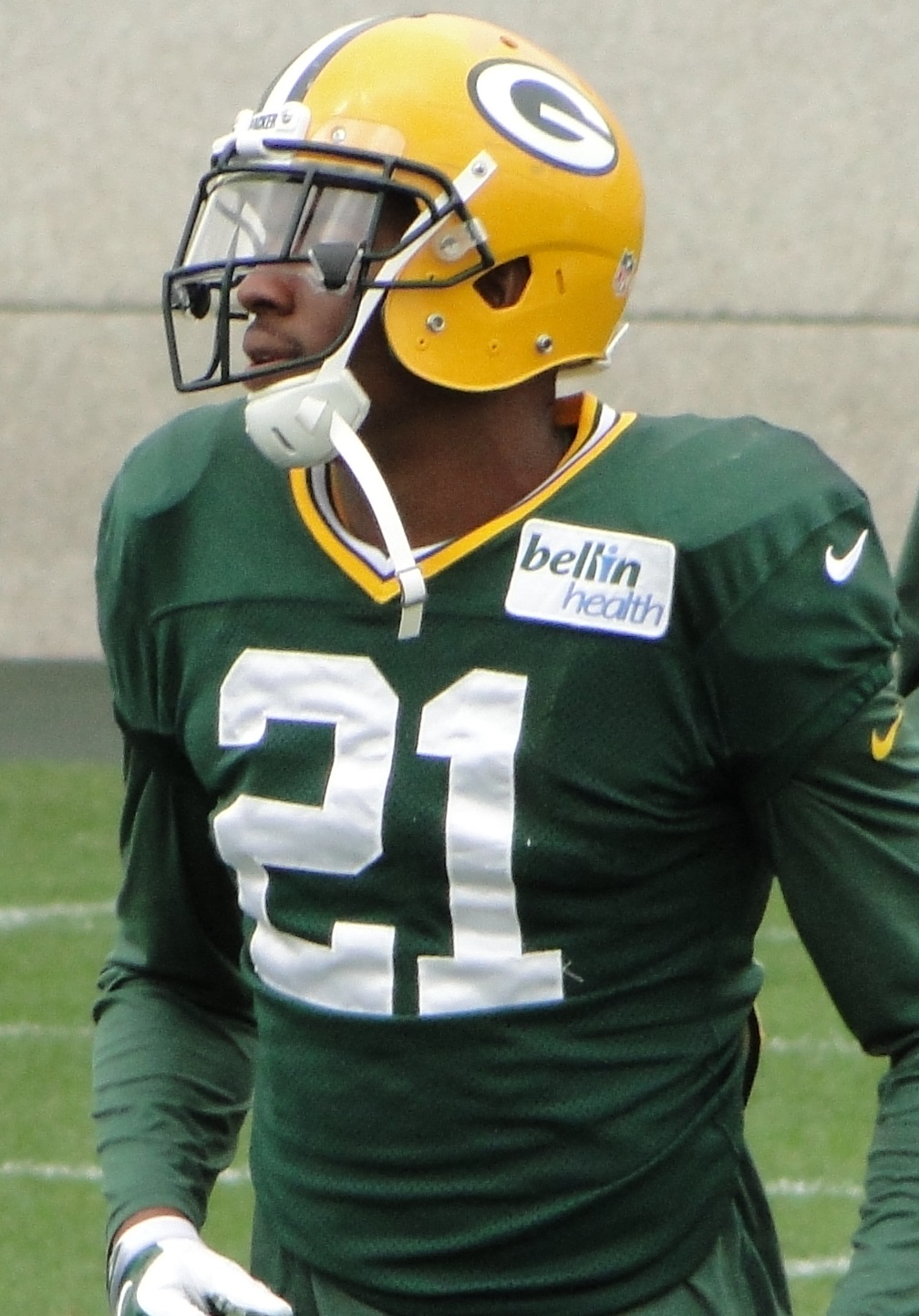
Clinton-Dix with the Green Bay Packers in 2014

Throughout training camp, Clinton-Dix competed against Micah Hyde for the job as the starting free safety. The free safety role was left vacant after the Packers chose not to re-sign M. D. Jennings. Head coach Mike McCarthy named Clinton-Dix the backup free safety, behind Hyde, to begin the regular season.

He made his professional regular season debut in the Packers' season-opener at the Seattle Seahawks and recorded five combined tackles, broke up a pass, and made his first career sack in their 26–16 loss. Clinton-Dix made his first career sack on Seahawks' quarterback Russell Wilson in the first quarter. On September 21, 2014, Clinton-Dix made one tackle, a pass deflection, and made his first career interception during a 19–7 loss at the Lions. He made his first career interception off a pass attempt by Lions' quarterback Matthew Stafford, that was intended for wide receiver Corey Fuller, and returned it for a nine-yard gain in the first quarter. On October 19, 2014, Clinton-Dix earned his first career start at free safety after defensive coordinator Dom Capers elected to start him over Hyde. Clinton-Dix recorded nine combined tackles during a 38–17 victory against the Carolina Panthers in Week 7. Clinton-Dix remained the starting free safety, alongside strong safety Morgan Burnett, for the last ten games and the regular season. In Week 15, he collected a season-high 13 combined tackles (six solo) in the Packers' 21–13 loss at the Buffalo Bills. He finished his rookie season in 2014 with 92 combined tackles (65 solo), six pass deflections, one interception, and one sack in 16 games and ten starts. He was named to the PFWA All-Rookie Team.

The Green Bay Packers finished first in the NFC North with a 12–4 record and earned a first round bye. On January 11, 2015, Clinton-Dix started in his first career playoff game and recorded six combined tackles as the Packers defeated the Dallas Cowboys 26–21 in the NFC Divisional Round. On January 18, 2015, Clinton-Dix made five combined tackles, deflected three passes, and intercepted two passes by Seahawks' quarterback Russell Wilson during the Packers' 28–22 overtime loss to the Seattle Seahawks in the NFC Championship Game.

==== 2015 ====
Clinton-Dix entered training camp slated as the starting free safety and was named the starter to begin the regular season. On November 15, 2015, Clinton-Dix collected a season-high 11 combined tackles (nine solo), broke up a pass, and intercepted a pass by quarterback Matthew Stafford during the Packers' 16–18 loss at the Lions, which marked their first loss to the Lions at home since 1991. Clinton-Dix started in all 16 games in 2015 and led the team with 100 combined tackles (83 solo) while also recording three pass deflections, three sacks, two interceptions, and one forced fumble.

The Packers finished second in the NFC North with a 10–6 record and earned a wildcard berth. On January 16, 2016, Clinton-Dix made four combined tackles, broke up two passes, and intercepted a pass attempt by Cardinals' quarterback Carson Palmer during the Packers' 26–20 overtime loss at the Arizona Cardinals in the NFC Divisional Round.

==== 2016 ====
McCarthy retained Clinton-Dix and Burnett as the starting safety tandem for a second consecutive season. On November 6, 2016, Clinton-Dix made three combined tackles, deflected two passes, made two interceptions, and was credited with half a sack during a 31–26 loss to the Indianapolis Colts in Week 9. His two interceptions off of passes by quarterback Andrew Luck marked his first career regular season game with multiple interceptions. In Week 15, he recorded five combined tackles, broke up two passes, and made two interceptions off pass attempts by Bears' quarterback Matt Barkley during a 30–27 win at the Chicago Bears. His performance against the Bears in Week 15 earned him NFC Defensive Player of the Week. On December 20, 2016, it was announced that Clinton-Dix was selected to play in the Pro Bowl. He was also named to the Second-team NFL AP All-Pro team for the first time in his career. Clinton-Dix started in all 16 games in 2016 and recorded 80 combined tackles (62 solo), seven pass deflections, a career-high five interceptions, and was credited with half a sack. He was ranked 77th by fellow NFL players on the NFL Top 100 Players of 2017.

The Packers finished atop of their division with a 10–6 record, clinching a playoff berth. They defeated the New York Giants 38–13 in the NFC Wild Card Round and defeated the Cowboys 34–31 in the NFC Divisional Round. On January 22, 2017, Clinton-Dix started in the NFC Championship and recorded five solo tackles and two pass deflections as the Packers lost 44–21 to the Atlanta Falcons in the NFC Championship.

==== 2017 ====
On May 1, 2017, the Green Bay Packers exercised a fifth-year, $5.59 million option. McCarthy retained Clinton-Dix and Burnett the starting safety tandem. On September 28, 2017, he collected a season-high eight solo tackles, a pass deflection, and made an interception during a 35–14 victory against the Bears in Week 4. In Week 13, he collected a season-high nine combined tackles during a 26–20 victory against the Tampa Bay Buccaneers. He started in all 16 games in 2017 and recorded 79 combined tackles (65 solo), six pass deflections, and three interceptions. He was ranked 100th by his peers on the NFL Top 100 Players of 2018.

==== 2018 ====
On January 1, 2018, the Packers announced their decision to fire defensive coordinator Dom Capers. McCarthy retained Clinton-Dix as the starting free safety to begin the season. On September 30, 2018, Clinton-Dix recorded three solo tackles, broke up a pass, and intercepted a pass by Bills' quarterback Josh Allen during a 22–0 win against the Bills in Week 4. It was his third consecutive game with an interception.

=== Washington Redskins ===
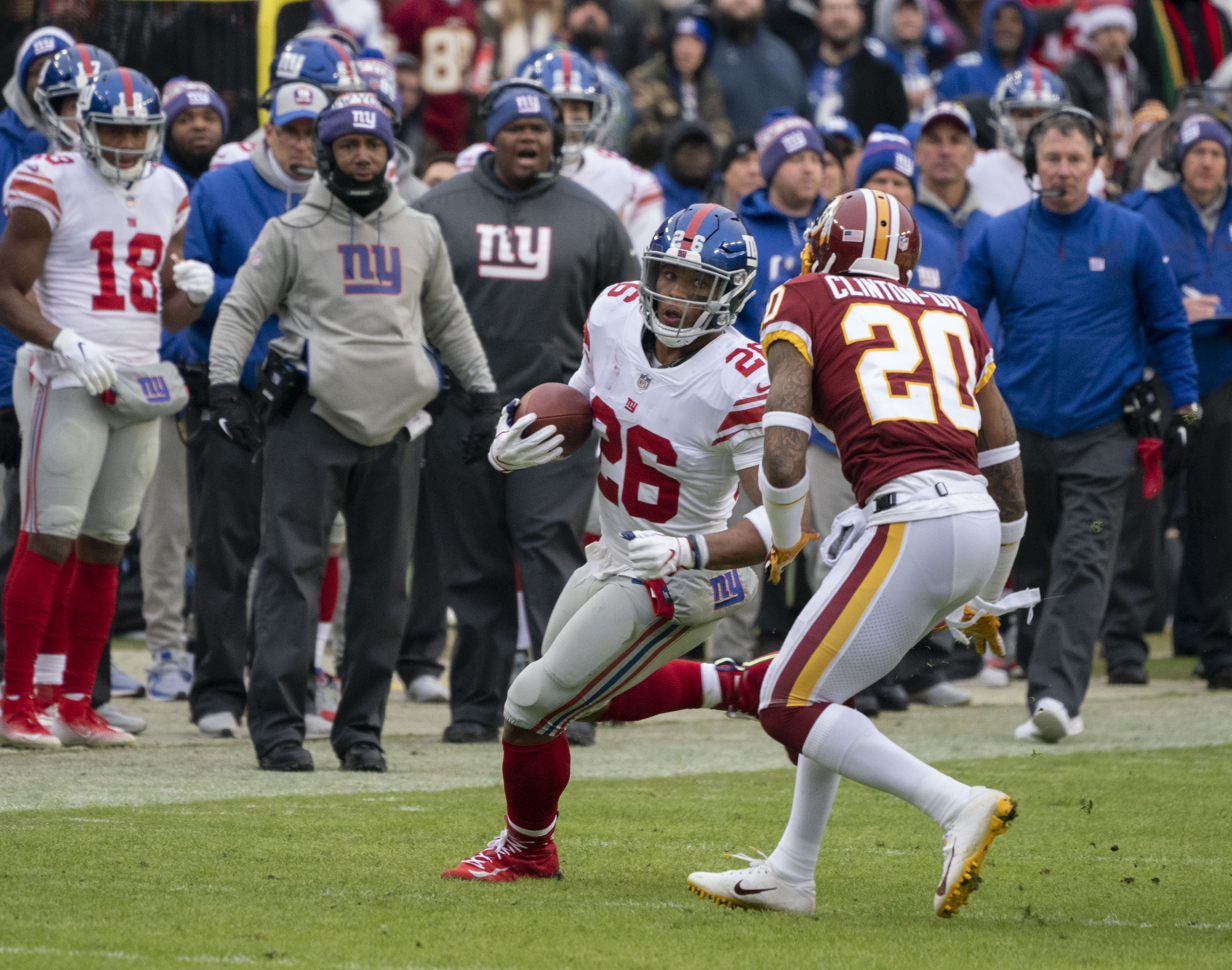
Clinton-Dix (right) with the Redskins in 2018

On October 30, 2018, the Green Bay Packers traded Clinton-Dix to the Washington Redskins in exchange for a fourth round pick in the 2019 NFL draft. Head coach Jay Gruden immediately named Clinton-Dix the starting free safety. He replaced Montae Nicholson and started alongside strong safety D. J. Swearinger. In Week 11, he collected a season-high 13 combined tackles (11 solo) during a 23–21 loss against the Houston Texans. Clinton-Dix started all 16 games in 2018 and finished the season with 93 combined tackles (80 solo), six pass deflections, three interceptions, two forced fumbles, and one sack.

=== Chicago Bears ===
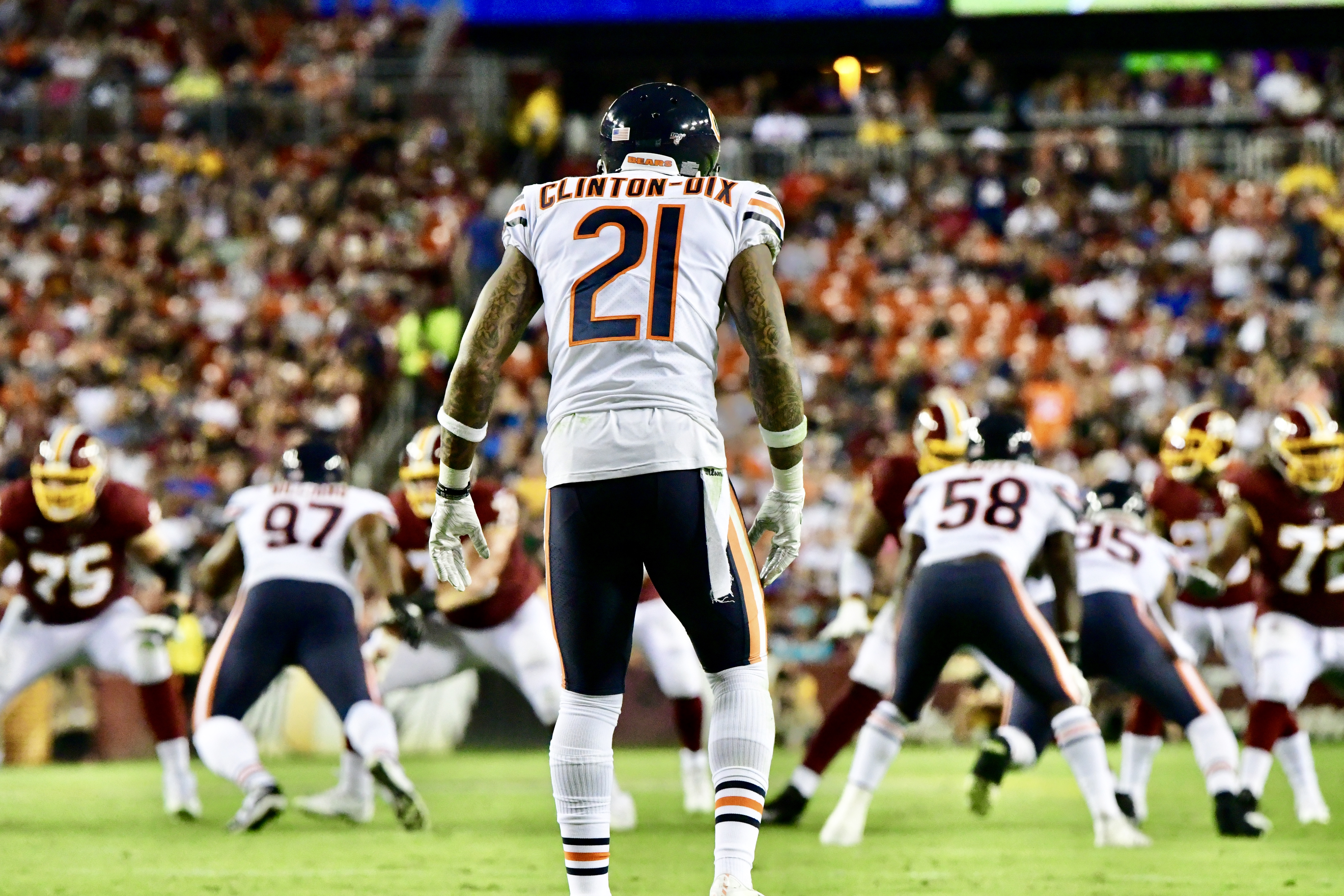
Clinton-Dix with the Chicago Bears in 2019

On March 14, 2019, Clinton-Dix signed a one-year, $5.5 million deal with the Bears. In week 3 against his former team, the Redskins, Clinton-Dix recorded a team high 9 tackles, intercepted Case Keenum twice, and returned one of them for a 37-yard touchdown in the 31–15 win. This was his first pick six of his career. In week 4 against the Minnesota Vikings, Clinton-Dix made 4 tackles and recovered a fumble forced by teammate Prince Amukamara on Stefon Diggs in the 16–6 win. In week 11 against the Los Angeles Rams on Sunday Night Football, Clinton-Dix recovered a fumble forced by teammate Eddie Jackson on running back Todd Gurley in the 17–7 loss. He finished the 2019 season with 78 total tackles (62 solo), two interceptions, and five passes defended.

=== Dallas Cowboys ===
On April 7, 2020, the Dallas Cowboys signed Clinton-Dix to a one-year, $3.75 million contract that includes $2.25 million guaranteed and a signing bonus of $1.25 million. He reunited with new Cowboys' head coach Mike McCarthy, who also held the same position with the Green Bay Packers. He was expected to be named one of the starters at safety and replace the recent free agent loss of Jeff Heath, but he was passed on the depth chart by Darian Thompson during training camp. Even though his contract included $2.25 million guaranteed in earnings, he was released one week before the start of the regular season on September 3, 2020.

=== San Francisco 49ers ===
On August 12, 2021, Clinton-Dix signed a one-year contract with the San Francisco 49ers. On August 31, 2021, Clinton-Dix was released by the 49ers.

=== Las Vegas Raiders ===
On September 15, 2021, Clinton-Dix was signed to the Las Vegas Raiders practice squad. He was released on December 8, 2021. He played in two games with the Raiders that season.

=== Denver Broncos ===
On December 15, 2021, Clinton-Dix was signed to the Denver Broncos practice squad. His contract expired when the team's season ended on January 8, 2022.

=== Retirement ===
On December 29, 2022, Clinton-Dix announced his retirement and signed a one-day contract with the Packers.

As of 2023, he is the director of player development for the Alabama Crimson Tide.

== Career statistics ==
=== NFL ===
==== Regular season ====
| Year | Team | Games | | Tackles | | | | Interceptions | | | | | Fumbles | | | |
| Year | Team | GP | GS | Cmb | Solo | Ast | Sck | PD | Int | Yds | Lng | TD | FF | FR | Yds | TD |
|---|---|---|---|---|---|---|---|---|---|---|---|---|---|---|---|---|
| 2014 | GB | 16 | 10 | 92 | 65 | 27 | 1.0 | 6 | 1 | 9 | 9 | 0 | 0 | 1 | 0 | 0 |
| 2015 | GB | 16 | 16 | 100 | 83 | 17 | 3.0 | 3 | 2 | 2 | 2 | 0 | 1 | 0 | 0 | 0 |
| 2016 | GB | 16 | 16 | 80 | 62 | 18 | 0.5 | 7 | 5 | 75 | 27 | 0 | 1 | 0 | 0 | 0 |
| 2017 | GB | 16 | 16 | 79 | 65 | 14 | 0.0 | 6 | 3 | 5 | 3 | 0 | 0 | 0 | 0 | 0 |
| 2018 | GB | 7 | 7 | 27 | 24 | 3 | 1.0 | 3 | 3 | 25 | 24 | 0 | 1 | 0 | 0 | 0 |
| 2018 | WAS | 9 | 9 | 65 | 56 | 9 | 0.0 | 3 | 0 | 0 | 0 | 0 | 1 | 1 | 0 | 0 |
| 2019 | CHI | 16 | 16 | 78 | 62 | 18 | 0.0 | 5 | 2 | 96 | 59 | 1 | 0 | 2 | 1 | 0 |
| 2021 | LV | 2 | 0 | 0 | 0 | 0 | 0.0 | 0 | 0 | 0 | 0 | 0 | 0 | 0 | 0 | 0 |
| Career | | 98 | 90 | 522 | 417 | 105 | 5.5 | 33 | 16 | 212 | 59 | 1 | 4 | 4 | 1 | 0 |

==== Postseason ====
| Year | Team | Games | | Tackles | | | | Interceptions | | | | | Fumbles | | | |
| Year | Team | GP | GS | Cmb | Solo | Ast | Sck | PD | Int | Yds | Lng | TD | FF | FR | Yds | TD |
|---|---|---|---|---|---|---|---|---|---|---|---|---|---|---|---|---|
| 2014 | GB | 2 | 2 | 11 | 8 | 3 | 0.0 | 3 | 2 | 53 | 27 | 0 | 0 | 0 | 0 | 0 |
| 2015 | GB | 2 | 2 | 8 | 5 | 3 | 0.0 | 4 | 1 | 0 | 0 | 0 | 0 | 0 | 0 | 0 |
| 2016 | GB | 3 | 3 | 11 | 11 | 0 | 0.0 | 4 | 0 | 0 | 0 | 0 | 0 | 0 | 0 | 0 |
| Total | | 7 | 7 | 30 | 24 | 6 | 0.0 | 11 | 3 | 53 | 27 | 0 | 0 | 0 | 0 | 0 |

=== College ===
| Season | Team | Games | | Tackles | | | | | | | Pass defense | | | | | Fumbles | | | |
| Season | Team | GP | GS | Solo | Ast | Cmb | TflL | Yds | Sck | Yds | Int | Yds | BU | PD | QBH | FR | Yds | FF | Blk |
|---|---|---|---|---|---|---|---|---|---|---|---|---|---|---|---|---|---|---|---|
| 2011 | Alabama | 13 | 0 | 5 | 6 | 11 | 0 | 0 | 0.0 | 0 | 0 | 0 | 2 | 2 | 0 | 0 | 0 | 0 | 0 |
| 2012 | Alabama | 14 | 10 | 23 | 14 | 37 | 0.5 | 1 | 0.0 | 0 | 5 | 91 | 4 | 9 | 0 | 0 | 0 | 0 | 0 |
| 2013 | Alabama | 11 | 9 | 30 | 21 | 51 | 3.5 | 7 | 0.0 | 0 | 2 | 24 | 4 | 4 | 0 | 0 | 0 | 0 | 0 |
| Total | | 38 | 19 | 58 | 41 | 99 | 4 | 8 | 0.0 | 0 | 7 | 115 | 10 | 15 | 0 | 0 | 0 | 0 | 0 |
